= Kizhakku Kadarkarai Salai =

- Title card
- Directed by: S. S. Stanley
- Written by: S. S. Stanley
- Produced by: Valaipechu S. Anthanan
- Starring: Srikanth; Bhavana
- Cinematography: M. V. Panneerselvam
- Edited by: Anil Malnad
- Music by: Paul J
- Release date: 10 November 2006
- Running time: 132 minutes
- Country: India
- Language: Tamil

Kizhakku Kadarkarai Salai (transl. East Coast Road) is a 2006 Indian Tamil-language action romance film written and directed by S. S. Stanley. The film stars Srikanth and Bhavana. It was released on 10 November 2006, and was not a commercial success.

== Plot ==
Ganesh, an orphan, comes in search of a job at a petrol bunk in East Coast Road (ECR). He manages to win the goodwill of the petrol bunk owner and gets employed there. Enters Priya, an arrogant college student. He throws a challenge to his friends to make Priya fall for him. Meanwhile, Priya's brother GTR, a leading criminal lawyer in the city, learns of Ganesh's moves and tries to thwart his plans.

Ganesh had lost his family to the 2004 tsunami, when they were at ECR to attend a family function. Coming to know of his past and his good ways, Priya is attracted to Ganesh. Priya's brother hatches a conspiracy to prevent them from getting married. He kidnaps his sister, and the blame falls on Ganesh.

How Ganesh overcomes all tragic events and succeeds in reuniting with Priya forms the remaining part of the story.

== Cast ==
- Srikanth as Ganesh
- Bhavana as Priya
- Suresh as Advocate GTR
- Ganja Karuppu as Ganesh's friend
- Muthukaalai as Ganesh's friend
- Santhana Bharathi as Politician
- Sridevi Ashok as Devi, Priya's friend
- Sampath Ram as Police officer
- Nellai Siva as Motorcycle driver
- Vijay Antony as Naren Gupta, the regional manager of Hindustan Lever Group of Companies (special appearance)

== Production ==
The film saw Stanley and Srikanth collaborating for third time after April Maadhathil and Mercury Pookkal and was produced by journalist and Srikanth's manager Andhanan. It was originally titled Kalla Sirippazhaga. The film's important scenes and fight scenes were shot at a petrol bunk near Marakkanam between Chennai and Pondicherry. The song "Kanja Penne" was shot at Azhiyar Dam.

== Soundtrack ==
The soundtrack was composed by Paul J. It is his feature film debut after having scored numerous jingles. The song "Oru Kodi" was inspired by "Ran Kurahan Mala" by the Sri Lankan duo Bathiya and Santhush. The audio was released on 15 September 2006.

Track listing
No.	Title	Singer(s)	Length
1.	"Kancha Penna"	Veeramani, Pallavi
2.	"Kengini Mingini"	Suresh Peter, Grace Karunas
3.	"Oru Koodi"	Donan Narray, Ganga
4.	"Vada Vangada"	Jassie Gift, Veeramani
5.	"Ajarey Ajarey"	Boney Chakravarthy
6.	"Eno Edhil Eno"	Jaydev
7.	"Welcome To ECR"	Swapna

== Critical reception ==
TSV Hari of Rediff.com wrote "A virtually invisible script by writer-director SS Stanley and meaningless songs, Stanley cannot seem to get it right in the horror that is Kizhakku Kadakarkarai Salai". A critic from Chennai Online wrote that "The film has some lively situations and the lead pair show exuberance". Lajjavathi of Kalki praised the romance between the lead pair but felt the problems they encounter in second half is uninteresting but praised Paul's music and Panneerselvam's cinematography and the director for interesting scenes and poetic dialogues and concluded saying story was based on tsunami but could have been a good film if it was more focused. Malathi Rangarajan of The Hindu wrote, "Stanley who has earlier revealed a knack of making the most simple, straightforward story fairly interesting, is off the mark this time".
