= Okariki Okaru =

- Poster
- Directed by: Rasool Ellore
- Written by: Kona Venkat (story, dialogue)
- Screenplay by: Rasool Ellore
- Produced by: P. Kiran
- Starring: Sriram; Aarthi Chhabria
- Cinematography: Sunil K. Reddy; Raja
- Edited by: Shankar
- Music by: M. M. Keeravani
- Production company: Anandi Art Creations
- Release date: 9 October 2003
- Country: India
- Language: Telugu

Okariki Okaru (transl. Each for the other) is a 2003 Indian Telugu-language romantic drama film that was directed by cinematographer Rasool Ellore in his directorial debut. The film stars Sriram and Aarthi Chhabria, and was a box office success.

== Plot ==
Swapna is a non-resident Indian (NRI) who, along with her grandfather, has arrived in India for a visit. Kameshwar "Kamesh" Rao Jr. is on a post-graduation pilgrimage to Kasi at the request of his grandmother. Kamesh sees Swapna at a railway station and falls in love with her. When introducing themselves they lie about their names, stating they are Rahul and Subba Lakshmi.

Swapna and her grandfather quickly leave for their relatives' place before Swapna can inform Rahul but she places a note in Rahul's wallet before leaving. When Swapna goes to her relatives' house, she learns her engagement is being arranged and is upset. Her father arrives for the engagement and stops it because the relatives have cheated Swapna's family on business, which caused Swapna's uncle (father's brother) to succumb to cardiac arrest.

After a year, Kamesh is looking for love and decides to go to the United States. For this purpose, he gets a job as an engineer at a software company so he visit the US on a work permit. Kamesh goes to the US and is working under Deepak, who is Swapna's cousin. Deepak wants to marry Swapna and she almost compromises by marrying Deepak. Kamesh meets Swapna.

== Cast ==
- Sriram in a dual role as
  - Kameswara "Kamesh" Rao Jr. / Rahul
  - Kameswara Rao Sr., Kameswara Rao Jr.'s late grandfather (in portrait)
- Aarti Chabria as Swapna Rao / Subba Lakshmi
- Manav Vij as Deepak
- Vijay as Puchu alias Samaparanjaneyulu
- Tanikella Bharani as Kameswara Rao Jr.'s father
- Hema as Kameswara Rao. Jr.'s mother
- Radha Kumari as Malleswari
- M. Balayya as Rao
- Devan as Swapna Rao's father
- Dharmavarapu Subramanyam as visa officer
- Ravi Prakash as Shahrukh
- Ahuti Prasad as Raghu
- Vennira Aadai Nirmala as Deepak's mother
- Jahnavi as herself
- Laxmi Ratten as Williams
- Gautam Raju as train passenger
- Duvvasi Mohan as train passenger
- Jr. Relangi as train passenger

== Production ==
=== Development ===
Cinematographer Rasool Ellore wanted to make his directorial debut; he met with producer ARS Prasad to this end. Sunil Reddy, who later directed Om 3D (2013), made his debut as a cinematographer with this film.

=== Casting ===
Tamil actor Srikanth used the name Sriram as his stage name for Okariki Okaru to avoid confusion with established Telugu actor Srikanth. Rasool Ellore narrated the script to Sriram on the sets of April Maadhathil (2002). Sriram wore a clean-shaven look for the first time in his career. Aarti Chabria made her Telugu debut with Okariki Okaru. After appearing a grandmother character in Nuvvu Leka Nenu Lenu (2002), Radha Kumari played a similar character in Okariki Okaru.

=== Filming ===
The scene in which Sriram declares his love to Chabria was filmed in a dense forest in Kerala. To the film crew's surprise, the location was filled with snakes and leeches. Local villagers told the film crew to leave and some of them did so but Ellore was still able to film the scene with the help of locals. The climax scene of the film was shot in rain, and because the scene is serious, Ellore was not perturbed when the rain washed off Chabria's makeup.

== Soundtrack ==
M. M. Keeravani composed the music and background score for Okariki Okaru. Ellore described the visuals of the songs before Keeravani composed for them. In a review of the soundtrack, a critic from The Hindu wrote: "Keeravani has that artistic touch in composing music, really! Good attempt."

S. S. Rajamouli, NTR Jr. and Allu Arjun were chief guests at the audio release event, which was held on 1 September 2003 at the Taj Banjara. Keeravani reused the song "Nadiradinna" in Paheli (2005) as "Dheere Jalna".

Telugu Track list
No.	Title	Lyrics	Singer(s)	Length
1.	"Vellipothe Elaa"	Sirivennela Seetharama Sastry	M. M. Keeravani, Shreya Ghoshal	05:08
2.	"Nadiradinna"	Chandrabose	Karthik, Ganga	05:15
3.	"Yekkadunnavamma"	Chandrabose	S. P. Balasubrahmanyam	05:27
4.	"Nuvve Na Shwasa"	Chandrabose	Shreya Ghoshal	05:04
5.	"Ghatu Ghatu Prema"	Chandrabose	Tippu, Nitya Santoshini	04:19
6.	"Allo Nerello"	Chandrabose	M. M. Keeravani, Ganga	05:19
Total length:				30:34

Tamil Track list
No.	Title	Singer(s)	Length
1.	"Enge Aval"	M. M. Keeravani, Shreya Ghoshal	05:08
2.	"Nadiradinna"	Karthik, Anuradha Sriram	05:15
3.	"Engu Sendrayamma"	Karthik	05:27
4.	"Neeye En Swaasam"	Mahati	05:04
5.	"Kadhal Kadhal"	Tippu, Anuradha Sriram	04:19
6.	"Azhago Azhagallo"	M. M. Keeravani, Srilekha Parthasarathy	05:19
Total length:			30:34

== Reception ==
Jeevi of Idlebrain.com praised several aspects of Okariki Okaru, including the music, screenplay, dialogues, direction and cinematography. Preetam Akkineni of Full Hyderabad called the film "clean good fun" and praised Keeravani's music for having meaningful lyrics "while still being poetic".

Okariki Okaru was subsequently dubbed in Tamil as Unnai Paartha Naal Mudhal with a comedy track by Ramesh Khanna added. A critic from Chennai Online wrote: "While the first part of the movie moves interestingly, the encounters between the lovers having a touch of humour, the second part is an overdose of melodrama, with scenes we’ve already seen".

== Box office ==
Okariki Okaru was a box-office success but Sriram did not sign any Telugu films for five years till Police Police (2010) because he was interested in making an action film.

== Awards ==
Nandi Awards

- Nandi Award for Best Debut Director – Rasool Ellore

CineMAA Awards

- Best Debutant Director

Santosham Film Awards

- Best Female Dubbing Artist - Sunitha (for Aarti Chabria)
- Best Male Character Artist - Tanikella Bharani
