= Pudhukottaiyilirundhu Saravanan =

- Poster
- Directed by: S. S. Stanley
- Written by: S. S. Stanley
- Produced by: S. K. Krishnakanth
- Starring: Dhanush; Aparna Pillai
- Cinematography: G. Ramesh
- Edited by: Anil Malnad
- Music by: Yuvan Shankar Raja
- Production company: Indian Theatre Production
- Release date: 14 January 2004
- Running time: 150 minutes
- Country: India
- Language: Tamil

Pudhukottaiyilirundhu Saravanan (transl. Saravanan from Pudukkottai) is a 2004 Indian Tamil-language road film written and directed by S. S. Stanley. The film stars Dhanush as the titular character and newcomer Aparna Pillai. Yuvan Shankar Raja composed the music, while Krishnakanth produced the venture. The film was released on 14 January 2004, coinciding with Thai Pongal.

== Plot ==
Saravanan's parents manage to send him abroad through a severe financial drought, thinking that he would pay off all their debts as soon as he lands in Singapore. Saravanan finds a job in Singapore through an agent and lands there with high hopes of earning three lakhs and sending the money back to his family. Living in a cramped apartment, Saravanan gets into an argument with a Chinese immigrant there. One day, the immigrant burns Saravanan's passport, and Saravanan starts fighting with him. The Chinese man is inadvertently killed in the fight. Everyone thinks that Saravanan is responsible, and he flees.

Shalini lives a luxurious life with her uncle in Singapore. Her parents and other relatives live in India. Shalini's uncle gets into a huge debt and ends up pawning her in a gamble. After losing the bet, he escapes at gunpoint. He finds Saravanan and asks him to take Shalini back safely to her family in India, and in return, he will get the amount of money he has been wishing for, three lakhs, as payment.

With the help of Vimal, Saravanan gets a duplicate passport. He and Shalini walk, hitchhike, and drive through Malaysia, Thailand, and Burma to get to India. Saravanan is injured at a checkpoint. As they arrive in Malaysia, Shalini falls in love with Saravanan. He tells her that his parents have arranged a marriage for him to a relative that he has not seen. Shalini uses some money that Saravanan earned to have his name tattooed on her chest. This shocks him, but he is eventually attracted to her. They arrive in Burma, and Saravanan gets money for food by participating in an arm-wrestling competition. They cross the border into India under the cover of a sandstorm.

Shalini is reunited with her parents safely, who give Saravanan the promised money. She asks him to return in two months if he loves her. Finally on Valentine's Day, he returns to Kolkata and reunites with her.

== Cast ==
- Dhanush as Saravanan
- Aparna Pillai as Shalini
- Karunas in a dual role as Vimal and Kamal
- Shasha Sri as Vimal's wife
- Peter Hein as Chinese Immigrant
- V. Swaminathan as Guna
- Gnanavel as Gnanam, Shalini's uncle
- M. Kafar as Kafar
- Ramana Ramakrishnan as Ponnusamy, Saravanan's father
- Srilatha as Saravanan's mother
- Vandana as Vandana, Saravanan's sister-in-law
- Sridevi Ashok as Selvi, Saravanan's sister
- Tharika as an item number
- Japan Kumar as Dancer in "Naatu Sarakku"

== Production ==
S. S. Stanley, who won critical acclaim for his debut in April Madhathil, collaborated with Dhanush, who had given back-to-back hits in 2003 with Kadhal Kondein and Thiruda Thirudi, to make a film. Sridevi Vijaykumar was initially approached to play the leading female role but was not available. Aparna Pillai won the Miss Chennai contest as a student and was sent to other pageants including the Miss Petite International contest in the United States. Stanley saw an article which appeared in The Hindu about her trip to the US and asked her to come for a make-up test, before selecting her to play the female lead in the film.

Pudhukottaiyilirundhu Saravanan was the first Tamil film after the 1973 film Ulagam Sutrum Valiban to have scenes shot in Thailand. The film was shot also in Singapore, Malaysia and Pulicat in the Thiruvallur District of India. The musical scene with Tharika was shot on a large set, complete with waterfalls and a pond erected by art director Santhanam at the Prasad Studios, and took about five days to shoot.

== Soundtrack ==
The soundtrack, composed by Yuvan Shankar Raja, was released on 4 December 2003. Dhanush sang the song "Naatu Sarakku", debuting as a playback singer.

Track listing
No.	Title	Lyrics	Singer(s)	Length
1.	"Malargale"	Thamarai	Bombay Jayashree	04:36
2.	"Baby Baby"	Pa. Vijay	Carla Morrison, Yuvan Shankar Raja	05:56
3.	"Where Do We Go"	Pa. Vijay	Yuvan Shankar Raja	03:14
4.	"Naatu Sarakku"	Pa. Vijay	Dhanush, Ranjith, Lavanya	04:37
5.	"Pudhu Kadhal"	Snehan	Ranjith, Chinmayi	05:08
6.	"Pudhukkotai Saravanan"	Na. Muthukumar	Kunal Ganjawala, Hema Sardesai, Nitish Gopal, Yugendran	04:25

== Release and reception ==
Theatrical rights for Tamil Nadu was sold for a record ₹11 crore helped by previous Dhanush hits. However, Malathi Rangarajan from The Hindu noted that "Story wise there's nothing much. All the same there are no boring villains or a contrived climax. Intended to be a light film, it stays that way till the end, but the director could have given a thought to the plausibility angle". G. Ulaganathan from Deccan Herald wrote that "While the lanky Dhanush does everything expected of him--fast dances, brilliant fights, and excellent dialogue delivery, the director lets him down with a silly story". M Bharat Kumar of News Today wrote "A gorgeous newcomer, good music and action-packed stunt sequences all find a place in the movie, yet one does not feel great at the end for no reason".

Malini Mannath of Chennai Online wrote "The script is insipid and the narration lacklustre. It's like the lead pair were asked to hop, jump and run all over the place without properly planned or convincing incidents for back-up. Added to that, we do not get to see any exotic locations or interesting spots, the director not taking advantage of his 'foreign trip'". Cinesouth wrote "A film that has no story and for this the director has taken so much trouble to frame a screenplay only counting on Dhanush". Sify wrote "Puthukottayilirundu Saravanan is a wannabe road movie thriller, which merely gives the genre a bad name. Neither exciting nor absorbing the film is as hackneyed as they can get. The formulaic plot starts from Puthukotta, moves to Singapore and from there by road to Malaysia, Thailand, Burma and back to Kolkota in India! Phew, Director S.S.Stanley shows scant regard for sense or logic".

The film was subject to controversy when a song, to which the lyrics had originally been censored, was shown uncut in the film.
