= Dinasari =

2025 Tamil film by G Sankar

- Theatrical release poster
- Directed by: G Sankar
- Produced by: Cynthia Lourde
- Starring: Srikanth; Cynthia Lourde
- Cinematography: Rajesh Yadav
- Edited by: N. B. Srikanth
- Music by: Ilaiyaraaja
- Production company: Cynthia Production House
- Distributed by: Ayngaran International
- Release date: 14 February 2025
- Country: India
- Language: Tamil

Dinasari (transl. Everyday) is a 2025 Indian Tamil-language romantic comedy film written and directed by G Sankar. The film stars Srikanth and Cynthia Lourde in the lead roles, and the latter also produced the film under her Cynthia Production House banner. Radha Ravi, M. S. Bhaskar, Premji Amaren, Meera Krishnan, and Vinodhini play supporting roles. The music was composed by Ilaiyaraaja with cinematography by Rajesh Yadav and editing by N. B. Srikanth.

Dinasari was released in theatres on 14 February 2025.

== Plot ==
Shakthivel's family is on the hunt for a bride, but Shakthivel has a unique condition: his wife must earn more than he does. His family is getting frustrated with the search, but his sister Gayathri insists they find someone soon. Shakthivel works in IT and is building a luxurious house with a hefty loan. He has also borrowed money from a local loan shark at a high interest rate. To get a better monthly return, he borrows ₹1 crore on the advice of his colleague Arjun "Leg" and invests it. Shakthivel's family arranges a meeting with Shivani, an Indo-American, without telling Shakthivel.

Shivani says she will not work after marriage because she dislikes people chasing her wealth, but Shakthivel's mother Valliyammai accepts her decision and welcomes her as her daughter-in-law. The family does not reveal Shakthivel's conditions to Shivani and instead lies to him, telling him she earns ₹1.25 lakhs per month. Shakthivel agrees to the marriage without knowing the truth. On their first night together, Shakthivel gives a presentation of their plans based on their incomes, which irritates Shivani. When he discovers the truth about her not working, he confronts his family for hiding it from him. Shivani stands firm, saying she will not work, as she values family over accumulating wealth.

Shakthivel frequently clashes with Shivani and his parents over his conditions and their decision to marry him off without his knowledge. One day, Shakthivel rescues Shalini from a group of molesters led by her manager, and she soon joins his company. However, Shakthivel's life takes a turn for the worse when one of his investments turns out to be a scam and the company goes bankrupt. Feeling scammed and unable to contact his colleague, Shakthivel faces an investigation for losing essential project data, leading to his termination. A frustrated Shakthivel lashes out at his family and wife. His family, fed up with his behavior, gives him the cold shoulder. Having lost his job, he incurs the wrath of the local don who lent him money at exorbitant interest rates. Desperate and unable to borrow more from friends, Shakthivel pawns Shivani's jewelry.

Understanding the gravity of the situation, Shivani takes up a job to support the family. Shakthivel tracks down Arjun and confronts him about his lost money, leading him to Punniyakodi, the owner of a fraudulent chit fund company. Punniyakodi threatens Shakthivel and refuses to return his money. Undeterred, Shakthivel files a police complaint. After fainting on the road, Shakthivel is rescued by a sanitary worker. Conversations with the worker and a witty child in a temple make Shakthivel realize he prioritized money over relationships. Shakthivel returns home with a newfound perspective and apologizes to his family for his behavior. He thanks them for their patience and love, acknowledging that he was solely driven by financial gain. He also apologizes to Shivani for forcing her to work and pleads with his family to talk to him again. The family reunites, and Shakthivel's life returns to normalcy.

At Shakthivel's office, Shalini, the reviewer, discovers that his manager framed him, and so he is reinstated after being proven innocent. With a change of heart, Shakthivel asks Shivani to stay home, but she suggests working for a few years before deciding. When the fraudulent chit company representatives threaten Shakthivel and his family to withdraw their case in exchange for his money, Shakthivel refuses, saying that others cheated by the company also deserve justice. The film concludes with Shivani deciding to sell her properties in the US to repay her husband's debts.

== Cast ==
- Srikanth as Shakthivel
- Cynthia Lourde as Shivani, Shakthivel's wife
- Radha Ravi as Punniyakodi
- M. S. Bhaskar as Pazhaniyappan, Shakthivel's father
- Premji Amaren as Prem, Shakthivel's colleague and friend
- Meera Krishnan as Valliyammai, Shakthivel's mother
- Vinodhini as Gayathri, Shakthivel's sister
- Kumar Natarajan as Shivani's adopted father
- Chaams as a marriage broker
- KPY Sarath as Shakthivel's colleague and friend
- Chandini Tamilarasan as Shalini
- Navvya Sujji as Prem's wife and Shakthivel's colleague
- Arjunan as Arjun, Shakthivel's colleague
- Aaru Bala
- Jayaseelan
- Shanthi Mani as Shakthivel's neighbour
- Diya Devashree as Shakthivel's niece
- Sivaram Rajendra

== Production ==
The film is produced by Cynthia Lourde under her Cynthia Production House starring herself and Srikanth in the lead roles. The technical team consists of Rajesh Yadav as the cinematographer, N. B. Srikanth as the editor and Ilaiyaraaja as the music composer and lyricist.

== Music ==
The soundtrack and its lyrics along with the background is scored by Ilaiyaraaja in his third collaboration with Srikanth after Manasellam (2003) and Oru Naal Oru Kanavu (2005).

All lyrics are written by Ilaiyaraaja.

Track listing
No.	Title	Singer(s)	Length
1.	"Thedi Thedi Naan Kanden Unnai"	V.V.Prasanna, Priya Mali
2.	"Seiginra Velaiyil"	Madhu Balakrishnan
3.	"Kadhalika Poiya Solla"	Ranjith, Bhavatharini, Priya Jenson
4.	"Kalyaana Maalai (Promo Song)"	S. P. Balasubrahmanyam

== Release ==
Dinasari released in theatres on 14 February 2025.

== Reception ==
Virakesari critic stated that " Rajesh Yadav's cinematography and N P Srikanth's editing are also enjoyable." Dinamalar wrote the first half, which is very good, slips in the second half. The screenplay is stagnant at times. If director Shankar had paid a little more attention to the screenplay, it would have been enjoyable. Except for the dialogue, everything in the film including technical elements is weak. Dina Thanthi praised the star cast, cinematography and music but found the scenes moving like a stage play as a drawback.
