= Srikanth (actor, born 1979) =

21st century Indian actor

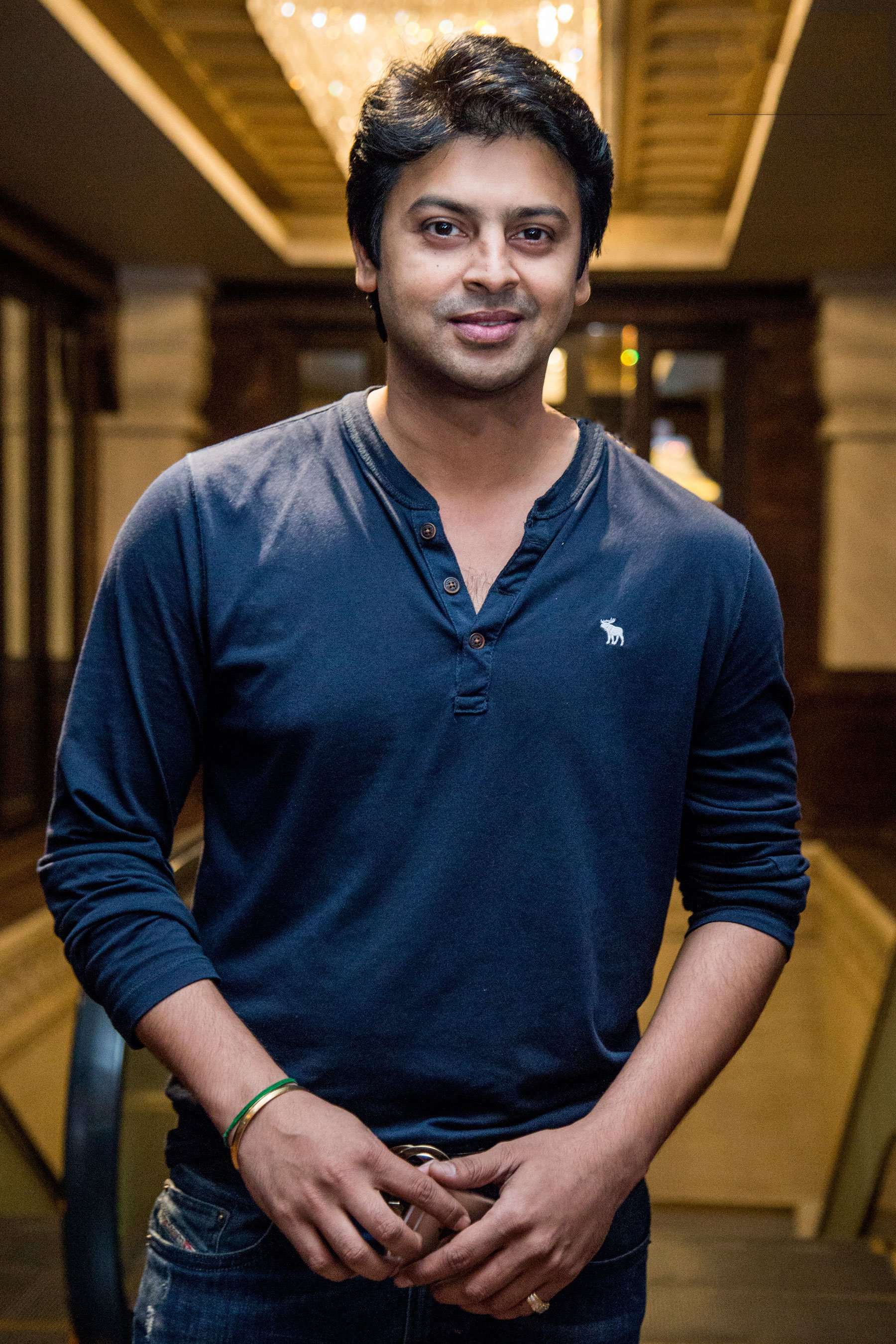
- Srikanth in 2016
- Born: 28 February 1979 (age 47); Madras, Tamil Nadu, India
- Other name: Sriram
- Occupation: Actor
- Years active: 1999–present
- Spouse: Vandana (m. 2008)
- Children: 2

Srikanth is an Indian actor known for his works predominantly in Tamil and Telugu films. He is credited as Sriram in Telugu films. He debuted in K. Balachander's tele serial Jannal – Marabu Kavithaigal (1999). His film debut was in the romantic film Roja Kootam (2002) and went on to star in more such films including April Maadhathil (2002), Parthiban Kanavu (2003), Okariki Okaru (2003) and Kana Kandaen (2005). He subsequently went on to portray action roles in Drohi (2010). He starred in Nanban (2012), remake of 3 Idiots directed by S. Shankar.

== Personal life ==
Srikanth was born to a Telugu-father (from Chittoor) and Tamil-mother (from Kumbakonam) in Chennai. His family hailed from Tirupati and he was raised in Hyderabad. His father worked in State Bank of India. Srikanth had an elder brother who died due to dengue after he returned from United States. Srikanth uses the name Sriram in Telugu films to avoid confusion with his contemporary Srikanth.

He married Vandana secretly and lived together for three months. They both later went to court after allegations against Vandana. The court ruled in favor of Vandana. He remarried Vandana on 7 September 2008, who had completed her MBA in Australia. The couple has two children.

On 23 June 2025, Srikanth was arrested by Tamil Nadu Police for possession of cocaine.

== Career ==
=== 2002–2009: Debut and breakthrough ===
Looking to step into an acting career after beginning as a model, Srikanth was coached acting skills by then-assistant directors such as Vetrimaaran and Mysskin in the early 2000s. Srikanth was selected to play the lead role in Kathir's Kadhal Virus (2002) and spent a year preparing for the film, before being replaced by fellow newcomer Richard. He was then considered to make his acting debut through Jeeva's 12B, but the role went to another newcomer Shaam. Further potential projects directed by Bharathiraja and K. Balachander also did not work out, before he was cast by Sasi in Roja Kootam (2002), after the original lead actor had opted out. After the film's success, he became popularly known as Roja Kootam Srikanth for a while.

Srikanth then featured in another successful venture April Madhathil (2002) alongside Sneha followed by Manasellam (2003). He won the Tamil Nadu State Film Award Special Prize for his role in Parthiban Kanavu (2003) opposite Sneha, directed by Karu Pazhaniappan. Srikanth's straight Telugu film was Rasool Ellore's directorial debut Okariki Okaru under the stage name of Sriram to avoid confusion with established star Meka Srikanth. The film received positive reviews upon release with one critic noting that "He did a sensible portrayal of the role". His first release of 2004 was Varnajalam, followed by Bose, in which he was paired with Sneha for the third time after April Maadhathil and Parthiban Kanavu. Kana Kandaen (2005) directed by K. V. Anand, with the Malayalam actor Prithviraj in his first Tamil role. Srikanth and Prithviraj gave a good performance also. The film was followed by Oru Naal Oru Kanavu (2005) and Bambara Kannaley (2005). In 2006, he acted in the film Mercury Pookkal, and Uyir. Behindwoods wrote: "Sri has come up with an excellent performance of a man lost in this juggernaut of emotions." TSV Hari at Rediff.com responded negatively to Kizhakku Kadarkarai Salai, noting a thin script and "meaningless songs". This was the third film and last collaboration between the director S. S. Stanley and Srikanth after April Maadhathil and Mercury Pookkal. His next film was Aadavari Matalaku Arthale Verule, a Telugu film directed by Tamil director Selvaraghavan. Srikanth play the second lead role after Telugu actor Venkatesh. This was followed by Vallamai Tharayo (2008), Poo (2008) and Indira Vizha (2009).

=== 2010–2017: Setbacks and success ===
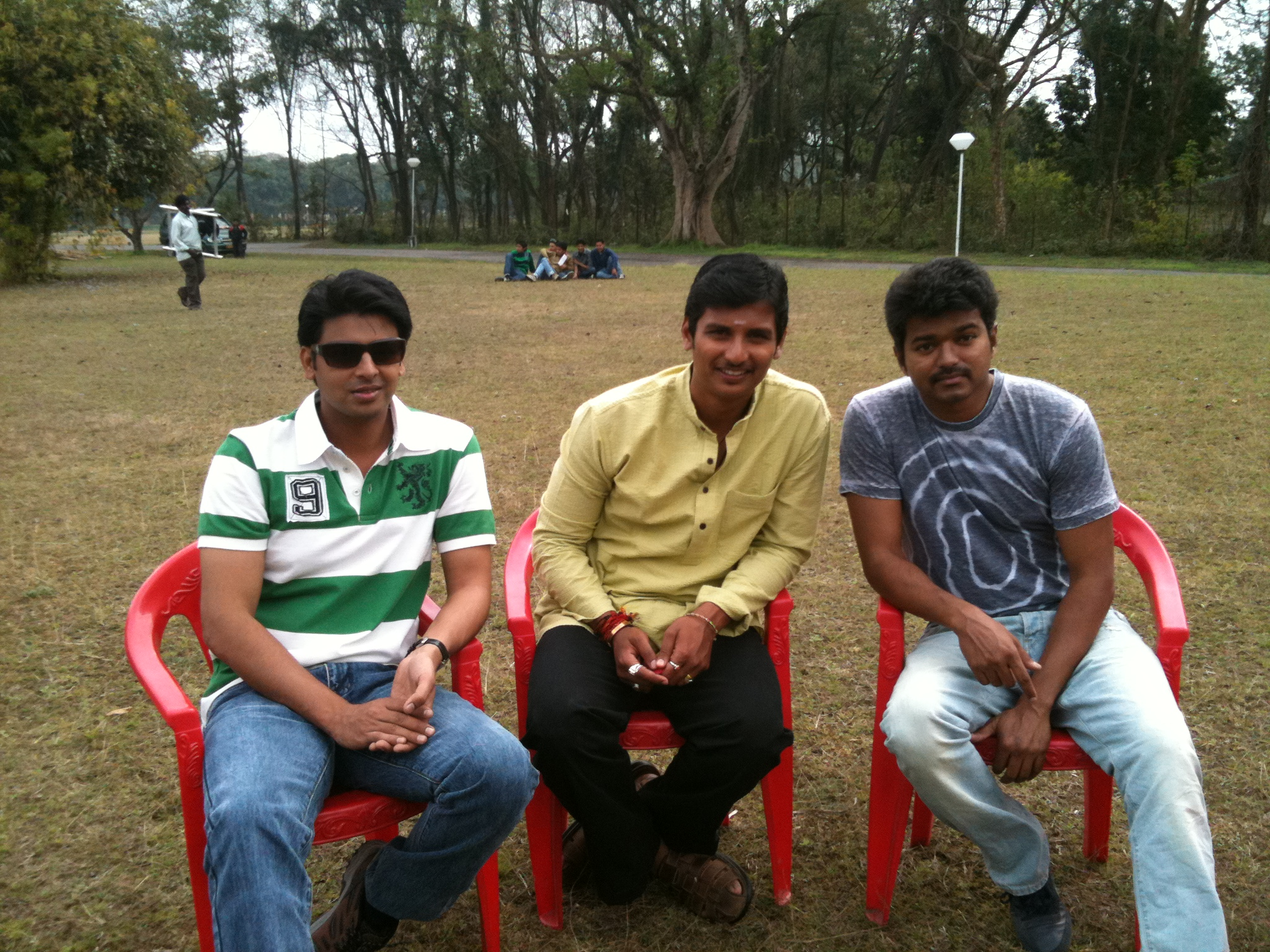
Srikanth with actors Jiiva and Vijay on the set for Nanban in 2012

In 2010, Srikanth released Rasikkum Seemane, Police Police and Drohi. Srikanth co-starring with the new Tamil actor Vishnu Vishal in this film. Mandhira Punnagai was last released as guest appearance. In 2011, he began in Malayalam film Uppukandam Brothers: Back in Action, a Telugu film, Dhada and Sadhurangam. The film was completed in 2006 but the film remained unreleased for five years. The project was released on 2011. These three movies were box office failures. In 2012, he was first seen in S. Shankar's comedy-drama Nanban (a remake of the Hindi-language film 3 Idiots), which featured him as part of an all-star cast including Vijay, Jiiva, Ileana D'Cruz and Sathyaraj. The movie is released to positive reviews. It was dubbed and released in Telugu as Snehitudu. He also started in Telugu film Nippu (2011), a Malayalam film Hero (2012) and comedy film Paagan (2012). Later, he acted in Buddy (2013) and Kathai Thiraikathai Vasanam Iyakkam (2014) as guest appearance directed by R. Parthiepan. In 2015, he played in the supernatural drama film Om Shanthi Om. The following year, he acted in the horror film Sowkarpettai (2016) and comedy Nambiyaar (2016). He appeared in the Telugu action thriller Lie (2017).

=== 2019–present ===
In 2019, his next film was Rocky: The Revenge, a Tamil action crime thriller centered on dogs. The film was a box office failure. He also appeared in the Telugu film Raagala 24 Gantallo (2019), where he played the cop.

Srikanth plays serial killer in the action thriller Mirugaa (2021), followed by three Telugu films Y (2021), Asalem Jarigindi (2021) and 10th Class Diaries (2022). Then he plays the role of a cop who investigates the case in the crime Maha. However, the film was a failure to critics. Later, he was cast in multi-stars in Coffee with Kadhal (2022), Bagheera (2023), Kannai Nambathey (2023) and Ravanasura (2023). After that, he returns as the main hero in Echo (2023), Amala (2023) and Pindam (2023). Srikanth played two characters in the film Operation Laila (2024). In 2025, he was seen in the romantic comedy Dinasari and Konjam Kadhal Konjam Modhal.

== Awards ==
- ITFA Best New Actor Award for Roja Kootam (2002)
- Tamil Nadu State Film Special Award for Best Actor for Parthiban Kanavu (2003)
- Kalaimamani Award from the Government of Tamil Nadu (2018)

== Filmography ==
Key
†	Denotes films that have not yet been released

- Note: He is credited as Sriram in Telugu.

List of Srikanth film credits
Year	Title	Role	Language	Notes	Ref.
2002	Roja Kootam	Illango	Tamil	ITFA Best New Actor Award	
2002	April Madhathil	Kathir	Tamil		
2003	Manasellam	Bala	Tamil		
2003	Parthiban Kanavu	Parthiban	Tamil	Tamil Nadu State Film Award Special Prize	
2003	Parthiban Kanavu	Parthiban	Tamil	Also singer for "Aalanguyil Koovum Rayyil"	
2003	Okariki Okaru	Kameswara Rao Jr., Kameswara Rao Sr.	Telugu	Dual roles	
2003	Joot	Eashwaran	Tamil		
2004	Varnajaalam	Sakthivel (Daniel)	Tamil		
2004	Bose	Bose	Tamil		
2005	Kana Kandaen	Bhaskar	Tamil		
2005	Oru Naal Oru Kanavu	Cheenu	Tamil		
2005	Bambara Kannaley	Arumugam	Tamil		
2006	Mercury Pookkal	Karthik	Tamil		
2006	Uyir	Sundar	Tamil		
2006	Kizhakku Kadarkarai Salai	Ganeshan	Tamil		
2007	Adavari Matalaku Ardhalu Verule	Vasu	Telugu		
2008	Vallamai Tharayo	Sekar	Tamil	Cameo appearance	
2008	Poo	Thangarasu	Tamil		
2009	Indira Vizha	Santhosh Srinivasan	Tamil		
2010	Rasikkum Seemane	Nandhu	Tamil		
2010	Police Police	SP Ranadhir IPS	Telugu		
2010	Drohi	Sami Srinivasan	Tamil		
2010	Mandhira Punnagai	Himself	Tamil	Guest appearance	
2011	Uppukandam Brothers Back in Action	Bobby	Malayalam		
2011	Dhada	Rajiv	Telugu		
2011	Sadhurangam	Thirupathisamy	Tamil	Delayed release; Filmed in 2003-06	
2012	Nanban	Venkat Ramakrishnan	Tamil		
2012	Nippu	Sriram	Telugu		
2012	Hero	Premanand	Malayalam		
2012	Paagan	Subramani	Tamil		
2013	Buddy	Neil Fernandez	Malayalam		
2014	Kathai Thiraikathai Vasanam Iyakkam	Himself	Tamil	Guest appearance	
2015	Om Shanti Om	Vasu	Tamil		
2016	Sowkarpettai	Shakthi, Vetri	Tamil	Dual roles	
2016	Nambiar	Ramachandran	Tamil		
2017	Lie	Aadi	Telugu		
2019	Rocky: The Revenge	ACP Santhosh	Tamil		
2019	Raagala 24 Gantallo	Narasimha IPS	Telugu		
2021	Jai Sena	Sriram	Telugu	Cameo appearance	
2021	Mirugaa	John (Aravind)	Tamil		
2021	Y	Raghuram	Telugu		
2021	Asalem Jarigindi	Shiva	Telugu		
2022	10th Class Diaries	Somu	Telugu		
2022	Maha	Vikram	Tamil		
2022	Coffee with Kadhal	Ravi	Tamil		
2023	Bagheera	Murali	Tamil		
2023	Kannai Nambathey	Ilamaran	Tamil		
2023	Ravanasura	Sekhar	Telugu		
2023	Echo	Prakash	Tamil		
2023	Amala	ACP Akbar Ali	Malayalam		
2023	Pindam	Anthony	Telugu		
2024	Operation Laila	Surya, Ravi	Tamil	Dual roles	
2024	Aanandhapuram Diaries	Prof. Paul Sundaraj	Malayalam		
2024	Sathamindri Mutham Tha	Vignesh	Tamil		
2024	Valari	Naveen Naidu	Telugu		
2024	Maya Puthagam	Yoga Narasimha	Tamil		
2025	Dinasari	Shakthivel	Tamil		
2025	Konjam Kadhal Konjam Modhal	Karthik	Tamil		
2025	Mathru	Professor Vishwanathan	Telugu		
2025	Blackmail	Ashok	Tamil		
2026	The Bed	Velu	Tamil		
2026	Erracheera	Inspector Sivakumar	Telugu		

=== Television ===
List of Srikanth television credits
Year	Work	Role	Network	Language	Notes
1999–2000	Jannal – Marabu Kavithaigal		Sun TV	Tamil	
2022	Recce	Lenin	ZEE5	Telugu	
2024	Sshhh	Arjun	aha	Tamil	Anthology series; segment Reload
2024	Harikatha	Virat	Disney+ Hotstar	Telugu	
2025	Network	Kiran	Aha	Telugu	
