= V. Ravichandran =

V. Ravichandran may refer to:

- V. Ravichandran (producer), Indian film producer and distributor
- Ravichandran (Kannada actor), full name Veeraswamy Ravichandran (born 1981), Indian actor, director, and producer
