= Anil Malnad =

Indian film editor

G. R. Anil Malnad
- Born: G. R. Dattatreya; 12 October 1957; Malnad, Karnataka, India
- Died: 19 March 2018 (aged 60); Chennai, Tamil Nadu, India
- Occupation: Film editor

Anil Malnad (12 October 1957 – 19 March 2018) was an Indian editor who worked in over 200 films across Telugu, Tamil and Odia languages. He won the National Film Award for Best Editing for the Telugu film Sitaara (1984).

== Biography ==
Malnad was born as G. R. Anil Dattatreya in Malnad, Karnataka, India. He started his film career as an assistant editor with the 1971 Telugu film Sampoorna Ramayanam, directed by Bapu. He later made his debut as an editor with Bapu's Vamsa Vruksham (1980).

Malnad lived with his family in Chromepet, Chennai. He died at the age of 60 on 19 March 2018 at a private hospital in Chennai; he was admitted after he suffered a heart attack.

== Selected filmography ==
=== Telugu ===
- Vamsa Vruksham (1980)
- Mantri Gari Viyyankudu (1983)
- Sitaara (1984)
- Preminchu Pelladu (1985)
- Anveshana (1985)
- Ladies Tailor (1986)
- Sankeertana (1987)
- Lawyer Suhasini (1987)
- Maharshi (film) (1988)
- Shri Kanakamalaxmi Recording Dance Troupe (1988)
- Chettu Kinda Pleader (1989)
- Swara Kalpana (1989)
- Gopala Rao Gari Abbayi (1989)
- Pelli Pustakam (1991)
- Prema Shikharam (1992)
- Taraka Ramudu (1997)
- Show (2002)

=== Tamil ===
- Kizhakku Vaasal (1990)
- Honest Raj (1994)
- Harichandra (1998)
- Pottu Amman (2000)
- Alli Thandha Vaanam (2001)
- Charlie Chaplin (2002)
- April Maadhathil (2002)
- Pudhukottaiyilirundhu Saravanan (2004)
- Neranja Manasu (2004)
- Maha Nadigan (2004)
- Devathaiyai Kanden (2005)
- Mercury Pookkal (2006)
- Perarasu (2006)
- Kizhakku Kadarkarai Salai (2006)
- Azhagiya Asura (2006)
- Aavi Kumar (2015)

=== Odia ===
- Thakura Achanti Chau Bahaku (1990)
- Kotia Manish Gotiye Jaga (1991)
- Naga Panchami (1992)
- Pacheri Uthila Majhi Duaru (1994)
- Sasu Hathakadi Bhauja Bedi (1999)

=== Hindi ===
- Pyari Behna (1985)
- Prem Pratigyaa (1989)

=== Kannada ===
- Nigooda Rahasya (1990)

=== English ===
- Catch Your Mind (2008)

== Awards ==
- 1984 - National Film Award for Best Editing - Sitaara
- 1985 - Nandi Award for Best Editor - Aalaapana
