= Manasellam =

- DVD cover
- Directed by: Santhosh
- Written by: Santhosh
- Produced by: V. Ravichandran
- Starring: Srikanth; Trisha
- Cinematography: J. Sivakumar
- Edited by: V. Jaishankar
- Music by: Ilaiyaraaja
- Production company: Oscar Films P. Ltd
- Release date: 20 March 2003
- Running time: 165 minutes
- Country: India
- Language: Tamil

Manasellam (transl. All over the heart) is a 2003 Indian Tamil-language romantic drama film written and directed by Santhosh in his debut. Produced by V. Ravichandran, it stars Srikanth and Trisha, while Cochin Haneefa plays a major supporting role. The film was released on 20 March 2003 and became a commercial failure.

== Plot ==
On his way to Chennai, Bala's bag and certificates get stolen in the train. He has a look about him that endears him to a petty shop owner Sundaram, who provides him accommodation in the top portion of his house along with a few bachelors. Malar is a girl who lives opposite this house, and the bachelors are crazy about her. They are scared if the handsome and cheeky Bala will try to woo her, so they hatch a plot and frame him so that Malar's two brothers beat him up black and blue. Three strangers, who claim to be his true friends from Hyderabad, save an unconscious Bala.

The true identity of Bala is told in a flashback by these friends, that he is a rich son of an industrialist. Malar saves Bala from an accident, and soon they are in love. But her brothers take her back to Chennai, as their sister had already eloped with someone. The brothers do not want her to commit the same mistake and make her promise that she will only marry someone of their choice. Also, it is revealed that Malar is suffering from some brain disease and will die soon. Knowing this, Bala had come to stay opposite her house only with the hope of seeing and making her happy till the end. Malar's health worsens, and she is admitted to hospital with minimal chances of survival. Bala leaves the hospital crying as he does not want to see Malar die in front of him. The film ends there.

== Cast ==
- Srikanth as Bala
- Trisha as Malar
- Cochin Haneefa as Sundaram
- Nizhalgal Ravi as Rajasekar (Malar’s elder brother)
- Rajashree as Geetha (Rajasekar's wife)
- Anand as Malar’s elder brother
- Rajeev as Bala's father
- Fathima Babu as Bala's mother
- Vaiyapuri as Guru (Bachelor)
- Shyam Ganesh as Ashok (Bachelor)
- Sukran as Sathya (Bachelor)
- Chandra Lakshman as Subha (Sundaram's daughter)
- Chaplin Balu as Murugan
- Scissor Manohar
- Baby Akshaya
- Besant Ravi
- Ilavarasu
- Laxmi Ratten as Doctor
- Ishwarya as Priya

== Production ==
The film marked the directorial debut of Santhosh who earlier assisted R. Parthiban, Ezhil and Sasi. Vidya Balan was initially selected as the lead actress but was subsequently replaced by Trisha. Vidya was removed as the director was dissatisfied with her work. Shooting took place at Vijaya Vauhini Studios in Chennai. For a scene where Srikanth was required to stand at a height of 60 feet (18 m) surrounded by fire, he got severely burnt. Despite doctor's advise to him to rest for three months, he proceeded working on the film after a month.

== Soundtrack ==
Soundtrack was composed by Ilaiyaraaja. Sajahan Waheed of New Straits Times wrote the "melodious music is definitely the saving grace in this otherwise much recycled and uninspiring love tale". Vignesh Ram of Nilacharal felt "it is a nice album with more appealing melodies and pathetic dance numbers. Though Ilaiyaraja has tried his best to cater the needs of young generation only his melodies leave a mark and Yuvan shankar Raja or other younger MD would have been a better choice for this film".

Song	Singer(s)	Lyrics
"Chinna Kuyile"	Karthik	Ra. Karunanidhi
"Kaiyil Deepam"	Sadhana Sargam, Chorus	Muthulingam
"Ilaya Nadhi"	Srinivas, Sadhana Sargam	Vaali
"Nee Thoongum Nerathil"	Hariharan	Palani Bharathi
"Nee Thoongum Nerathil"	Sadhana Sargam	Palani Bharathi
"Highwasiley Ley Ley"	S. N. Surendar, Tippu, Karthik	Palani Bharathi
"Midnightula"	Malgudi Subha, Karthik	Palani Bharathi
"Nilavinile Oli"	Hariharan, Sadhana Sargam	Palani Bharathi
"Oru Jodi Kuyil"	Vijay Yesudas	Mu. Metha

== Critical reception ==
NanjilOnline.com wrote: "On the whole Manasellam leaves you with a migraine". Malathi Rangarajan of The Hindu wrote, "Manasellam has the ingredients of an entertaining fare — but the worn-out storyline and trying sequences are stumbling blocks". Malini Mannath of Chennai Online wrote "The first half moves at an interesting pace, and the twist just before the second half, leaves the audience in a state of suspense and curiosity. But then the second half falls short of expectations. There are quite a few cliches, co-incidences, and unanswered questions". Krishna Chidambaram of Kalki praised the pairing and acting of Srikanth and Trisha but panned Vaiyapuri's humour and felt in the name of an unexpected twist, rubberizing the first half and forcing the entire story in the second half is new and called the film average. Cinesouth wrote, "According to the story, the heroine, Trisha gets frequent headaches in the film. But, more than her, it is the audience who complains of a nagging pain in the head after watching the film, thanks to director Santosh".

Indiainfo wrote, "MANASELLAM starts off with promising note but when the film inches towards the climax, confusion creeps in. Debutant director Santhosh’s lack of command over screenplay leaves the audience in boredom at the end of the film. Charming Srikanth’s acting and Trisha’s beauty are the major attractions of the film. Director Santosh seeks all sorts of gimmicks in the second half of the film to prolong the story. And the film has so many traces of so many love stories like GEETANJALI, IDHAYAM etc". Deccan Herald wrote "A tragic love story woven beautifully with hummable songs, an average script and a little bit of unwanted violence. Director Santosh has treated the theme of love well but at times it looks like he has run out of ideas. The narration lacks punch in the second half with director introducing so many elements and characters". Screen wrote "The offbeat love story by director Santosh showcases the acting ability of Srikanth who, till now, was projected only as the romantic chocolate hero. He has made full use of the opportunity to give his best". Sify wrote "Sadly, the film lacks soul and style. The audience cannot empathise with Bala’s sense of unbearable loss or the anguish of Malar. Debutant director Santhosh has stitched together couple of old films of Vikraman and Fazil. [..] On the whole Manasellam is melodramatic."
