= ITFA Best New Actor Award =

The ITFA Best New Actor Award is given by the state government as part of its annual International Tamil Film Awards for Tamil (Kollywood) films.

== The list ==
Here is a list of the award winners and the films for which they won.

Year	Actor	Film
2008	Shanthnoo Bhagyaraj	Sakkarakatti
2007	Arya	
2006		
2005		
2004	Siddharth	Boys
2003	Srikanth	Roja Kootam

== See also ==
- Tamil cinema
- Cinema of India
