= Seenu (1999 film) =

- Theatrical release poster
- Directed by: Sasi
- Written by: P. Rajendra Kumar (dialogues)
- Screenplay by: Sasi
- Story by: Sasi
- Based on: Sollamale (Tamil)
- Produced by: R. B. Choudary
- Starring: Venkatesh; Twinkle Khanna
- Cinematography: Shyam K. Naidu
- Edited by: Marthand K. Venkatesh
- Music by: Mani Sharma
- Production company: Super Good Films
- Release date: 27 August 1999
- Running time: 153 minutes
- Country: India
- Language: Telugu

Seenu is a 1999 Indian Telugu-language romantic drama film produced by R. B. Choudary under the Super Good Films banner, directed by Sasi. It stars Venkatesh and Twinkle Khanna in her Telugu debut, and has music composed by Mani Sharma. The film is a remake of a 1998 Tamil movie Sollamale. The film was unsuccessful at box office. This was the first and only Telugu film of erstwhile actress, Twinkle Khanna.

== Plot ==
Seenu is an honest, not-too-fashioned, village artist who comes to the city to find a job. He ends up being a banner artist. Shwetha is a U.S. citizen, who loves India and its culture and stays with her relatives to learn about Bharatanatyam. She is a soft-natured, loving girl who loves to help people in distress, but cannot stand it if anyone lies or cheats. Initially, when these two meet, she mistakes Seenu to be mute and pities him. Swetha's occasional friendlier association with Seenu, in the means of helping, gradually blossoms into love. By this time, it is too late for the guilt-ridden Seenu to disclose the truth as he feared the risk of losing her. Despite all his efforts to reveal the truth, Swetha learns of his sham by herself. However, in the end, she realizes Seenu's true intentions for acting as a mute and forgives him. However, at the climax, when Swetha asks Seenu to speak to her, he keeps silent because he had asked a doctor to cut his tongue so that he could be what Swetha had come to love.

== Cast ==
- Venkatesh as Seenu
- Twinkle Khanna as Swetha
- Prakash Raj as Dr. Surya Prakash
- Brahmanandam as TV Anchor
- Sudhakar as Nani
- Ali as Painter
- M. S. Narayana as Barber
- Chandra Mohan as Vikram's father
- Charu Hasaan as Artist Farnandis
- Brahmaji as Vikram
- Raghunatha Reddy as Swetha's father
- Anand as Riyaz
- Raja Ravindra as Engine oil Anjineelu / Sunny
- Maharshi Raghava as MD
- Naveen as Akash
- Ananth Babu as Attender
- Chitti Babu as Parrot Horoscope Person
- Gautam Raju as Watchman
- Uttej as Painter
- Siva Parvathi as Vikram's mother
- Varsha as Lavanya
- Madhavi Sri as Swetha's mother
- Medha
- Rajasri
- Kalpana Rai as florist
- Vajja Venkata Giridhar as Vikram's friend
- Raasi in a special appearance (item number)

== Production ==
A song was shot in Switzerland.

== Soundtrack ==
Seenu

Film score by Mani Sharma
- Released: 1999
- Genre: Soundtrack
- Length: 30:22
- Label: Aditya Music

Mani Sharma chronology
Raja Kumarudu (1999)	Seenu (1999)	'Anaganaga Oka Ammai' (1999)

Music composed by Mani Sharma. Music released on ADITYA Music Company.

No.	Title	Lyrics	Singer(s)	Length
1.	"Aatakundo Time"	Bhuvanachandra	Shankar Mahadevan	4:52
2.	"Premante"	Vennelakanti	Hariharan, Sujatha	5:06
3.	"Allo Neredukalla"	Sirivennela	Partha Saradhi, K.S.Chithra	4:39
4.	"Ye Kommaka"	Veturi	S. P. Balasubrahmanyam	4:48
5.	"Yemani Cheppanu"	Veturi	Hariharan	5:21
6.	"O Manali O Manali"	Vennelakanti	Sukhwinder Singh, Swarnalatha, Sangeetha Sachith	5:32
Total length:				30:22

== Reception ==
A critic from Deccan Herald wrote that "Strip the movie of the acting of Venkatesh and there is little else left, leaving you craving for all that you expect from a good movie – gripping story line, memorable music and rip-roaring humour". On the contrary, a critic from Sify wrote that "Venkatesh does a neat job, while Twinkle Khanna slowly picks up tempo in her performance. Mani Sarma’s music, barring two songs fails to impress. The movie is running to packed houses in its second week, thanks to the novelty in the subject and director Sasi’s deft handling".
