= Ravana (film) =

2009 Indian Kannada-language film

- Directed by: Yogish Hunsur
- Written by: Yogish Hunsur; Malavalli Saikrishna
- Based on: Kaadhal Kondein (2003)
- Produced by: Uday K. Mehta; Mohan G Nayak
- Starring: Yogesh; Sanchita Padukone
- Cinematography: R Giri
- Edited by: Srinivas G Babu
- Music by: Abhimann Roy
- Release date: 14 December 2009
- Country: India
- Language: Kannada

Ravana is a 2009 Indian Kannada-language romantic psychological thriller film directed by Yogish Hunsur starring Yogesh and Sanchita Padukone in lead roles. It is a remake of the Tamil-language film Kaadhal Kondein (2003).

== Plot ==
Vinod, an orphan, falls in love with his classmate Divya. When he realises that she considers him as a friend and is in love with someone else, he takes up the risky task of reuniting two lovers.

== Cast ==
- Yogesh as Vinod
- Sanchita Padukone as Divya
- Santhosh Kumar as Adhi
- Dwarakish
- Srinivasa Murthy
- Ninasam Ashwath
- Srinath Vasista
- K V Manjaiah

== Music ==
Ravana

Soundtrack album by Abhimann Roy
- Released: 2009
- Recorded: 2009
- Genre: Feature film soundtrack
- Length: 26:32
- Language: Kannada

Official audio
- Ravana - Full Album on YouTube

Track listing
No.	Title	Singer(s)	Length
1.	"Chakli Nippattu"	Abhimann Roy	4:46
2.	"Jooba Jooba"	Rajesh Krishnan	4:12
3.	"Ethake Munisu (Bit)"	Abhimann Roy, Yashaswini Roy	1:08
4.	"Ninna Manevaregu"	Badri Prasad	4:29
5.	"Hejjeya Guruthugalu"	Anuradha Bhat, Chethan Sosca	5:14
6.	"Guttu Helale (Bit)"	Ramanujam L R	1:16
7.	"Beautiful (Bit)"	Avinash Chebbi	0:57
8.	"Thampu Thampu"	Rajesh Krishnan	5:10
Total length:			26:32

== Reception ==
=== Critical response ===
A critic from The New Indian Express wrote "Music director Abhiman has provided melodious music. It is worth watching for those who love action films and have not watched the Tamil or Telugu versions". B S Srivani from Deccan Herald wrote "So has R Giri’s camerawork, supported by a good finish. But ‘Ravana’ is guilty. Of cleverly inserting the flashback scenes of the original (where the detailing was perfect, down to the boy resembling Dhanush) and getting dubbing artistes to work on them. Perhaps this is one such money-saving method the producers are desperately looking for. A sham. However, Yogesh fans can look forward to a slew of ‘anti-hero’ roles from him". A critic from The Times of India scored the film at 2.5 out of 5 and wrote "Yogish, though impressive, struggles to give life to his tough character. Sanchita has done a neat job and Santhosh excels. Music director Abhiman Roy has composed some melodious numbers. Camerawork by R Giri is good". A critic from Sify.com wrote "It is a right kind of role for Yogish but he has to involve in avoiding inconsequential situations. Sanchitha Padukone has a good debut in Kannada. She is tall and beautiful. Srinivasamurthy and Dwarakish have nothing to boast. Abhiman Roy after a long innings has done a good job in the music. Three of his five scorings are very melodious. The lyrics are also good. Giri camera work is flawless".
