= V. Ravichandran (producer) =

Indian film producer

- Born: Vellore, Tamil Nadu, India
- Other names: Aascar Ravichandran; Oscar Ravichandran; Venu Ravichandran
- Occupation: Film producer
- Years active: 1978–present

Viswanathan Ravichandran (also known as Venu Ravichandran) is an Indian film producer and film distributor in Chennai, Tamil Nadu. He is the founder and owner of the production and distribution company, Aascar Films Pvt. Ltd, previously known as Oscar Films. Ravichandran started his venture in 1998 with the co-production of Kadhalukku Mariyadhai. He went on to produce many large-scale Tamil language films and distribute a number of English films across South India.

== Early life ==
He was born in Vellore and completed his graduation from Voorhees College, Vellore. His brothers own smaller production companies, Celebrity Pictures and Viswas Pictures. He started distributing films since he was 16 years old as he was the son of a leading distributor in Vellore.

== Career ==
Prior to making his name as a film producer, Ravichandran had been a leading film distributor in Tamil cinema since the late 1970s and gained attention through the distribution of Jackie Chan films across Tamil Nadu. Ravichandran made his debut as a producer in cinema through Fazil's romantic drama film Kadhalukku Mariyadhai (1997), which he co-produced with Sangili Murugan. Though Fazil offered him the opportunity to produce the Malayalam version of the film first, Ravichandran refused because he wanted his first venture to be in Tamil. The film went on to become one of the most successful films of the year, while his second venture, Vikraman's family drama Vaanathaippola (2000), received similar commercial success. His third and fourth films, Ezhil's family drama Poovellam Un Vasam (2001) and Sasi's romantic film Roja Koottam (2002), were also highly profitable ventures.

In 2012, Ravichandran and director Shankar began work on the romantic thriller film, I (2015), featuring Vikram in the lead role. En route to becoming one of the most expensive Tamil films of all time, I took three years to complete, with over ten thousand people involved in the making of the film. The team also subsequently held a grand audio launch event with Arnold Schwarzenegger being brought in as chief guest for the event, and I released shortly after, becoming a profitable venture.

== In the media ==
Ravichandran actively avoids being photographed and prefers to remain incognito at the promotional events of his films. In an interview with Behindwoods, he revealed that there were no photographers at his wedding and that in family photos, only his wife would appear with his children.

== Filmography ==
=== Production ===
Year	Title	Language	Notes
1997	Kadhalukku Mariyadhai	Tamil	Co-producer
2000	Vanathai Pola	Tamil	
2001	Poovellam Un Vasam	Tamil	
2002	Ezhumalai	Tamil	
2002	Roja Kootam	Tamil	
2002	Ramana	Tamil	
2002	En Mana Vaanil	Tamil	
2003	Jay Jay	Tamil	
2003	Manasellam	Tamil	
2004	Thendral	Tamil	
2005	Anniyan	Tamil	
2006	Parijatham	Tamil	
2006	Thalai Nagaram	Tamil	
2006	Dishyum	Tamil	
2006	Rendu	Tamil	
2007	Marudhamalai	Tamil	
2007	Unnale Unnale	Tamil	
2007	Pachaikili Muthucharam	Tamil	
2008	Dasavathaaram	Tamil	
2008	Vaaranam Aayiram	Tamil	
2009	Ananda Tandavam	Tamil	
2011	Leelai	Tamil	
2011	Lucky Jokers	Malayalam	
2011	Velayudham	Tamil	
2013	Maryan	Tamil	
2014	Vallinam	Tamil	
2014	Thirumanam Ennum Nikkah	Tamil	
2015	I	Tamil	
2015	Bhooloham	Tamil	
2018	Vishwaroopam II; Vishwaroop II	Tamil; Hindi	Co-producer

=== Distribution ===
Year	Title
1978	Drunken Master
1982	Dragon Lord
1982	First Blood
1983	Project A
1983	Winners and Sinners
1984	Wheels on Meals
1985	Police Story
1985	Rambo: First Blood Part II
1985	The Emerald Forest
1985	The Protector
1986	Armour of God
1987	Predator
1987	Project A Part II
1988	Bloodsport
1988	Police Story 2
1988	Rambo III
1989	Kickboxer
1990	Lionheart
1990	Total Recall
1991	Armour of God II: Operation Condor
1991	Double Impact
1991	Once Upon a Time in China
1991	Terminator 2: Judgment Day
1992	Once Upon a Time in China II
1992	Police Story 3: Super Cop
1992	Twin Dragons
1992	Universal Soldier
1993	City Hunter
1993	Crime Story
1993	Jurassic Park
1994	Drunken Master II
1994	True Lies
1995	GoldenEye
1995	Rumble in the Bronx
1995	Thunderbolt
1996	Black Mask
1996	Police Story 4: First Strike
1996	The Quest
1997	Anaconda
1997	Double Team
1997	Mr. Nice Guy
1998	Rush Hour
1998	Who Am I?
1999	Gorgeous
1999	Universal Soldier: The Return
2000	Shanghai Noon
2001	The Accidental Spy
2001	Replicant
2001	Rush Hour 2
2001	The Mummy Returns
2002	Hero
2003	Shanghai Knights
2003	The Medallion
2003	The Order
2003	The Twins Effect
2004	Miracle
2007	Hitman
2007	Spider-Man 3
2008	Kung Fu Panda
2010	The Expendables
2010	The Karate Kid
2010	Moscowin Kavery
2012	The Amazing Spider-Man
2012	Skyfall
2013	My Lucky Star
2014	Into the Storm
2015	Furious 7
2015	Jurassic World
2015	San Andreas
2015	Avengers: Age of Ultron
2015	Mad Max: Fury Road
