= Satya Harishchandra (2017 film) =

2017 Kannada comedy film by Dayal Padmanabhan

- Directed by: Dayal Padmanabhan
- Screenplay by: Dayal Padmanabhan
- Story by: Sri Swamiji
- Produced by: K. Manju
- Starring: Sharan; Sanchita Padukone; Bhavana Rao
- Cinematography: Faizal Ali
- Edited by: Sri Crazymindz
- Music by: Arjun Janya
- Production company: K. Manju Cinemaas
- Release date: 20 October 2017
- Country: India
- Language: Kannada

Satya Harishchandra is a 2017 Indian Kannada language romantic comedy film written and directed by Dayal Padmanabhan. It is produced by K. Manju under his K. Manju Cinemaas banner. It features Sharan, Sanchita Padukone and Bhavana Rao. The score and soundtrack for the film is by Arjun Janya and the cinematography is by Faisal Ali. The film was launched officially on 18 September 2016 and the filming took place at Mysore, Melukote and Portugal. The film released on 20 October 2017 during the Diwali festival.

The film is an official remake of the 2013 Punjabi film Singh vs Kaur, the first Punjabi film to be remade in Kannada.

== Cast ==
- Sharan as Satya Harishchandra
- Sanchita Padukone as Saanvi
- Bhavana Rao as Jayalakshmi
- Chikkanna
- Sharath Lohitashwa as Patel
- Seetha
- Vidyullekha Raman
- Valerian Menezes

== Soundtrack ==
Satya Harishchandra

Soundtrack album by Arjun Janya
- Released: 13 September 2017
- Genre: Feature film soundtrack
- Language: Kannada
- Label: Lahari Music
- Producer: Arjun Janya

The film's score and soundtrack was composed by Arjun Janya. The audio was released online on 13 April 2017 and the music rights were acquired by Lahari Music. The soundtrack consists of four songs written by Yogaraj Bhat, Kaviraj and V. Nagendra Prasad. The popular folk song "Kuladalli Keelyavudo" from the Rajkumar starrer film Satya Harishchandra (1965) was reused in the soundtrack by adding the modern sound techniques. The song was shot in Melukote and Imran Sardhariya was roped in to choreograph the song.

Tracklist
No.	Title	Lyrics	Singer(s)	Length
1.	"Ninna Hinde"	Kaviraj	Karthik
2.	"Huttu Wasteu Bodyge"	Yogaraj Bhat	Chandan Shetty
3.	"I Am Your Fan"	V. Nagendra Prasad	Vijay Prakash, Supriya Lohith
4.	"Kuladalli Keelyavudo"	Hunsur Krishnamurthy	Vijay Prakash
