= Nooru Saami =

2026 film directed by Sasi

- Theatrical release poster
- Directed by: Sasi
- Written by: Sasi
- Produced by: Meera Vijay Antony
- Starring: Vijay Antony; Swasika; Ajay Dhishan; Sakthiraj
- Cinematography: Darshan Kirlosh
- Edited by: Harish Yuvaraj
- Music by: Balaji Sriram
- Production company: Vijay Antony Film Corporation
- Distributed by: Sri Kumaran Films
- Release date: 19 June 2026
- Running time: 150 minutes
- Country: India
- Language: Tamil

Nooru Saami (transl. Hundred gods) is a 2026 Indian Tamil-language drama film written and directed by Sasi. The film stars Vijay Antony, Swasika, Ajay Dhishan, and Sakthiraj. It was released on 19 June 2026 to positive reviews from critics and performed well at the box office.

== Plot ==
The story follows Selvi, a young widow who loses her husband and is left to raise her two sons, Baskar and Vivek, in a conservative rural village. To provide them with a better future, she works tirelessly as an agricultural laborer and sacrifices her own happiness. Despite her hard work, she faces harassment and social stigma because she is a widow.

Years later, Selvi is encouraged to consider remarriage. However, her elder son Baskar strongly opposes the idea, believing it would dishonor his late father. The disagreement creates a deep rift in the family, and Baskar leaves home.

After several years, Baskar matures and realizes the emotional and personal sacrifices his mother has made. He comes to understand that she deserves companionship and happiness rather than a lifetime of loneliness. He changes his stance and supports her decision to remarry.

Selvi is eventually matched with Ezhumalai, a widower and farmer who has also endured loneliness after losing his wife. The film focuses on whether the family and society will accept their marriage and challenges traditional attitudes toward widow remarriage.

== Cast ==
- Vijay Antony as Ezhumalai
- Swasika as Selvi
- Karunas as Selvi's brother
- Lijomol Jose as Angela Sister
- Ajay Dhishan as Baskar
- Kavya Anil as Vandhana
- Sakthiraj as Vivek
- Padine Kumar as Sandhya (Vivek's love interest)
- Aruldoss as School Teacher
- Munishkanth as Police Inspector
- Bagavathi Perumal as Kimki, Vandhana's father
- Vinodhini Vaidyanathan as Vandhana's mother
- Balaji Sakthivel as Pachaperumal
- Jenson Dhivakar
- Moorthy as Marriage broker
- Subramaniam Siva as Sandhya's father
- Thamarai
- Sabitha Roy
- Kodangi Vadivel Murugan
- Manimegalai
- Abinaya
- Saratha
- Muthualagi
- Jay
- Ravichandran
- Senthil
- Meena
- R. Dharshan as Selvi's prospective groom
- Master Maithriyan and Master Madhav as young Baskar and Vivek

== Production ==
The film is based on a true story that Sasi encountered while watching a reality television show. Its title is derived from a song from Pichaikkaran (2016), also starring Vijay Antony and directed by Sasi. While Antony's nephew Ajay Dhishan plays a major role, Antony volunteered to play Elumalai despite the character's limited screen time.

== Music ==
The soundtrack and background are scored by Balaji Sriram while the lyrics for all songs were written by Mohan Rajan. It is Balaji's debut.

Track listing
No.	Title	Singers	Length
1.	"Amma Amma Dhaan"	Sreekanth Hariharan
2.	"Maaya Kanavo"	Chinmayi Sripada, Kapil Kapilan
3.	"Reengara"	Anurag Kulkarni, Darini Hariharan
4.	"Yedo Yedo"	Chinnaponnu
5.	"Sonnalum Sonniye"	Santosh Hariharan, Vaikom Vijayalakshmi

== Reception ==
Abhinav Subramanian of The Times of India said, "there have been enough interchangeable village dramas this year to lose count, and this one sticks, largely because it stays entertaining and trusts you to feel its weight without being told to." Srinivasa Ramanujam of The Hindu said, "What starts with much promise slowly veers into melodramatic territory. The dialogues hit home hard, but a lot of them are too literal and almost take the audience for granted." Avinash Ramachandran of Cinema Express said, "The film constantly puts society under the scanner and shows how tough it is for a single woman in a world that conveniently sees her as a mother when required, and an 'available woman' during other times."
