= Operation Laila =

- Theatrical release poster
- Directed by: A. Venkatesh
- Written by: A. Venkatesh
- Produced by: Selvam Ponnaiyan
- Starring: Srikanth; Sidhika Sharma
- Cinematography: KK
- Edited by: B. Lenin
- Music by: Karthika Mahadev
- Production company: Selrin Production
- Release date: 23 February 2024
- Running time: 124 minutes
- Country: India
- Language: Tamil

Operation Laila is a 2024 Indian Tamil-language supernatural horror film written and directed by A. Venkatesh. The film stars Srikanth and Sidhika Sharma, with Imman Annachi, Vincent Asokan, Sridhar and Vanitha Vijayakumar in supporting roles. It was released on 23 February 2024 and did not perform well at the box office.

== Plot ==
Surya, a police officer, faces a dangerous situation when his twin brother Ravi, a drill master, falls in love with Anjali and encounters a ghost named Laila.

== Cast ==
- Srikanth as Surya and Ravi
- Sidhika Sharma as Anjali
- Imman Annachi as a guard
- Vincent Asokan as the principal
- Sridhar as Ganeshan
- Vanitha Vijayakumar as a police inspector

== Production ==
The film was shot in and around Nagercoil.

== Soundtrack ==
The music was composed by Karthika Mahadev, in her debut.

Track listing
No.	Title	Lyrics	Singer(s)	Length
1.	"Anbe Anbe"	Madhan Karky	Saindhavi	3:00
2.	"Sillatta Siricha"	Vivek	Anthony Daasan	3:57
Total length:				6:57

== Release and reception ==
Operation Laila was released in theatres on 23 February 2024. The film's overseas distribution rights were bought by United India Exporters. Maalai Malar felt Srikanth was somewhat awkward when playing a police officer but Sharma did what was required of her, and the film was overtly familiar but appreciated the cinematography and background score. The film did not perform well at the box office.
