= Pillaiyar Theru Kadaisi Veedu =

- Theatrical release poster
- Directed by: Kishore Tirumala
- Written by: Kishore Tirumala; Nagarajan
- Produced by: R. B. Choudary
- Starring: Jithan Ramesh; Sanchita Padukone
- Cinematography: M. V. Panneerselvam
- Edited by: V. Jaisankar
- Music by: Chakri
- Production company: Super Good Films
- Release date: 24 June 2011
- Running time: 130 minutes
- Country: India
- Language: Tamil

Pillaiyar Theru Kadaisi Veedu (transl. The Last House of Pillayar Street; also known by the initialism PKTV) is a 2011 Indian Tamil-language drama film written and directed by newcomer Kishore Tirumala, and produced by R. B. Choudary of Super Good Films. The film stars Jithan Ramesh and Sanchita Padukone, while Suhasini, Jayaprakash, Prakash Raj, Soori, and Bose Venkat play supporting roles. It was released on 24 June 2011.

== Plot ==
Ganesan is a happy-go-lucky youth in a village. A great admirer of actor-director T. Rajendar, he spends time with his friends. This is ridiculed by his father. Ganesan's life takes a turn when he comes across Sandhya. She is a friend of his sister, who comes on a vacation to the village. He admires her beauty and falls for her. When Ganesan gathers guts to open his heart to Sandhya, enters Valli, daughter of Ganesan's uncle. Fearing that her father will get her married to a local goon named Durai, she decides to marry Ganesan. Suddenly, Sandhya falls ill, and Ganesan takes her to the hospital. He is shocked when the doctor informs that she has pancreatic cancer and will die in a few months. Ganesan, in a bid to keep her happy until her death, marries her and comes home. Unfortunately, he incurs his father's wrath and is driven out of the house. However, a sudden twist in the plot causes the film to end on an emotional note.

== Cast ==
- Jithan Ramesh as Ganesan
- Sanchita Padukone as Sandhya
- Jayaprakash as Ganesh's father
- Prakash Raj as Doctor
- Soori as Ganesan's friend
- Bose Venkat as Durai
- Suhasini as Valli
- Ilavarasu as Ganesan's uncle
- Akila as Gowri, Ganesan's sister
- Rama as Valli's mother
- Swaminathan as Police Inspector
- Chitti Babu as Doctor
- Nellai Siva

== Production ==
Pillaiyar Theru Kadaisi Veedu, the directorial debut of Thirumalai Kishore, marked Ramesh's return to acting after a years-long sabbatical. He said he rejected at least 300 scripts in 12 months before accepting this one.

== Soundtrack ==
The soundtrack was composed by Telugu composer Chakri, in his Tamil debut.

Track listing
No.	Title	Singer(s)	Length
1.	"Osiyila"	Mukesh Mohamed
2.	"Enakkoru Devathai"	Hariharan, Kousalya
3.	"Rasathi"	Achu
4.	"Gnanapanditha"	Sanjana
5.	"Pillayar Kovil"	Chakri

== Critical reception ==
Malathi Rangarajan of The Hindu wrote, "Pillaiyaar Theru Kadaisi Veedu only gives a sense of déjà vu. But the final sequences are suspenseful. Just as you begin to laugh it off as usual melodrama, comes a twist to the tale. And the sudden shift to serious mode catches you unawares [...] Writer-director Thirumalai Kishore, a first-timer, scores with a story that's strong and narration that's reasonably intelligent." The New Indian Express wrote, "Thirumalai Kishore’s directorial debut has a clichéd storyline and loosely-scripted characters." Sify wrote, "Why did Jithan Ramesh agree to do such a lifeless and tasteless film?".
