= Sky (2026 film) =

2026 Telugu-language drama film

- Directed by: Pridhvi Pericharla
- Written by: Pridhvi Pericharla (story & dialogues); Murali Krishnam Raju
- Produced by: Nagi Reddy Guntaka; Sree Lakshmi Guntaka; Murali Krishnam Raju; Pridhvi Pericharla
- Starring: Murali Krishnam Raju; Shruti Shetty
- Cinematography: Rasool Ellore
- Edited by: Suresh Urs
- Music by: Shiva Prasad
- Production company: Valour Entertainment Studios
- Release date: 13 February 2026
- Country: India
- Language: Telugu

Sky is a 2026 Indian Telugu-language drama film written and directed by Pridhvi Pericharla. The film stars Murali Krishnam Raju and Shruti Shetty in the lead roles.

== Cast ==
- Murali Krishnam Raju
- Shruti Shetty
- Anand
- Rakesh Master
- M. S.
- KLK Mani Bamma

== Production ==
The film was produced under the banner of Valour Entertainment Studios. In September 2022, The Times of India reported that the film had entered its final leg of shooting.

== Release ==
The film was released theatrically on 13 February 2026.

== Reception ==
The film received mixed reviews from critics.

NTV Telugu gave a detailed review discussing the performances and emotional narrative. News18 Telugu also reviewed the film and published its rating.
