= Nippu =

2012 Indian Telugu action film

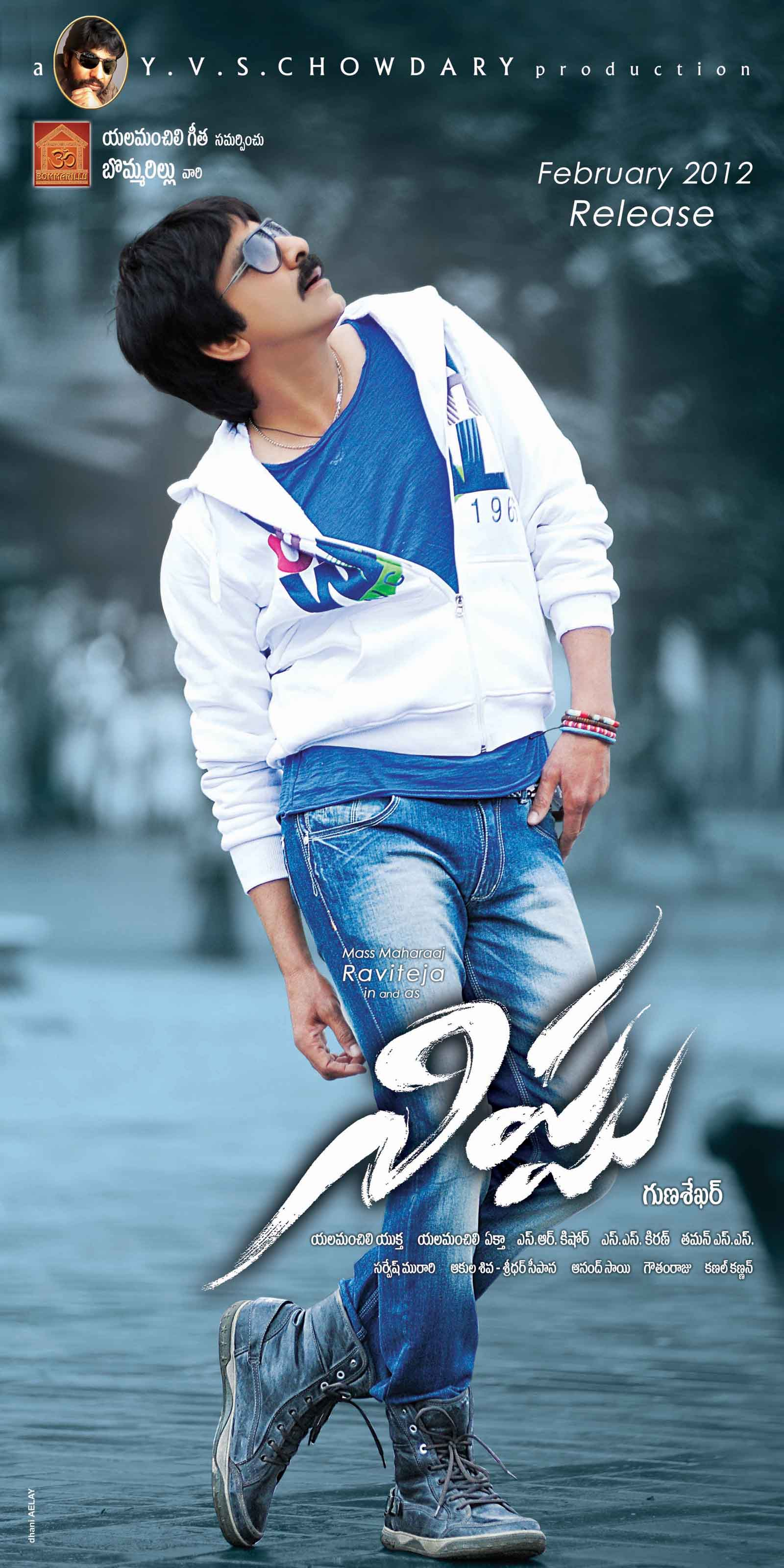
- Movie Poster
- Directed by: Gunasekhar
- Written by: Gunasekhar
- Produced by: YVS Chowdary
- Starring: Ravi Teja; Deeksha Seth
- Cinematography: Sarvesh Murari
- Edited by: Gautham Raju
- Music by: S. Thaman
- Production company: Bommarillu
- Release date: 17 February 2012
- Running time: 157 minutes
- Country: India
- Language: Telugu

Nippu (transl. Fire) is a 2012 Indian Telugu-language action comedy film produced by YVS Chowdary on his Bommarillu banner and written and directed by Gunasekhar. The film stars Ravi Teja and Deeksha Seth, and the music was composed by S. Thaman.

== Plot ==
The story begins with Surya, who owns a gym and has a good friend named Sriram. Surya is in love with Sriram's sister Meghna, and after some cat-and-mouse games, she also falls in love with Surya. After a while, Sriram goes to Saudi Arabia for a job and develops feelings for Vaishnavi. The story takes a turn when Surya also goes to Saudi Arabia to celebrate Sriram's birthday and is shocked when the police arrests Sriram on the charge of murdering Vaishnavi. He is sentenced to death. The only thing Surya can do is get the signature from Vaishnavi's parents to acquit Sriram, but Vaishnavi's father is Raja Goud, the bad guy whom Surya has been fighting all along. What happens from there forms the rest of the story.

== Cast ==
- Ravi Teja as Surya
- Deeksha Seth as Meghana
- Sriram as Sriram
- Bhavana as Vaishnavi (cameo appearance)
- Pradeep Rawat as Raja Goud
- Rajendra Prasad as Narayana Murthy
- Mukul Dev as Shankar Khakha
- Brahmanandam as Kaasi
- Vinay Varma as Dubai Police Commissioner
- Pragathi as Sriram's mother
- Ashwini Kalsekar as Raja Goud's wife
- Krishnudu as Sukku
- Surekha Vani as Sridevi
- Master Bharath as Kaasi's son
- Jaya Prakash Reddy
- Meenakshi
- Sheriina as Remya
- Supreeth as Raja Goud's henchman
- Brahmaji as Raja Goud's henchman
- Raghu Babu
- Fish Venkat as Raja Goud's henchman
- Dharmavarapu Subramanyam
- Jeeva
- Prabhakar
- Praveen as Surya's friend
- Jogi Naidu
- Kalpika Ganesh
- Sapthagiri
- Swapnika Vardhanapu
- Sri Sudha
- Sri Lalitha
- Harish Shankar in a cameo role

== Production ==
Ravi Teja, Gunasekhar and Y. V. S. Chowdary, who were roommates during their struggling days before their entry into cinema decided to make a film together. After his film Varudu, Gunasekhar announced this project. The film's title was announced initially as Kathi, but after facing problems from the Nandamuri family Gunasekar gave up the title and changed it to Nippu.

== Soundtrack ==
Nippu

Soundtrack album by S. Thaman
- Released: 20 January 2012
- Recorded: 2012
- Genre: Film soundtrack
- Length: 26:22
- Label: Aditya Music
- Producer: S. Thaman

S. Thaman chronology
| Bodyguard (2012) | Nippu (2012) | Kadhalil Sodhappuvadhu Yeppadi (2012) |

The soundtrack is composed by S. Thaman. Yuvan Shankar Raja was widely reported as the music director of Nippu, however he was replaced by Thaman. The audio was successfully launched on 20 January 2012.

Track list
| No. | Title | Lyrics | Singer(s) | Length |
|---|---|---|---|---|
| 1. | "Vega Vega" | Chandrabose | Shankar Mahadevan | 3:57 |
| 2. | "Nena Ninnu" | Vanamali | Karthik, K.S.Chithra | 4:16 |
| 3. | "Alibaba" | Viswa | Javed Ali | 4:23 |
| 4. | "Oy Pilla" | Ramajogayya Sastry | Tippu, Harini | 4:19 |
| 5. | "Duba Duba" | Bhaskarabhatla Ravi Kumar | S. Thaman | 4:33 |
| 6. | "Dhiya Dhiya" | Ananta Sriram | Rahul Nambiar, Sri Krishna, Krishna Chaitanya, Geetha Madhuri, Deepu, Himabindhu, Sudha, Parnika | 4:36 |
| 7. | "Nippu Slokam" | Ananta Sriram | Sravana Bhargavi | 1:38 |
| Total length: | | | | 26:22 |

== Critical reception ==
Radhika Rajamani from Rediff, while reviewing the film Telugu film Nippu, has given 2/5 stars and wrote, "instead of scorching the screen, the fire seems to have been extinguished by the director himself with his cold and lacklustre screenplay. Even Ravi Teja's presence doesn't seem to prop up the film that has a wafer-thin story.
