= Sidhika Sharma =

Indian model and actress

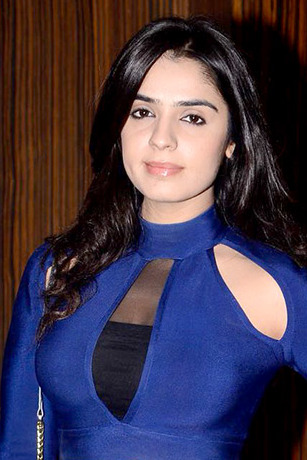
- Born: 19 November 1995 (age 30); Dehradun, India
- Education: Delhi University
- Occupations: Actress; Model
- Years active: 2012–present

Sidhika Sharma is an Indian actress who works mainly in Telugu and Punjabi films. She rose to fame after playing the supporting role in Paisa.

== Filmography ==
Year	Film	Role	Language	Notes	Ref.
2012	All the Best	Lucky	Telugu	credited as Lucky Sharma	
2012	Galli Kurrollu	Sangeeta	Telugu	credited as Shefali Sharma	
2014	Paisa	Sweety	Telugu	credited as Sidhika	
2019	Prema Parichayam		Telugu		
2021	Fuffad Ji	Matto	Punjabi		
2022	Oye Makhna	Guddi	Punjabi		
2023	Ninne Pelladatha	Priya	Telugu		
2024	Operation Laila	Anjali	Tamil		
