= S. S. Stanley =

Indian film director (1967–2025)

- Born: 14 December 1967; Munnar, Kerala, India
- Died: 15 April 2025 (aged 57); Chennai, Tamil Nadu, India
- Education: Graduated in Botany from Government arts college, Coimbatore, Tamil Nadu, India
- Occupation: Film director
- Years active: 2002–2025

S. S. Stanley (14 December 1967 – 15 April 2025) was an Indian film director and actor who directed Tamil films. He was active primarily as a filmmaker and a writer in the 2000s collaborating in ventures which often included Srikanth.

== Career ==
S. S. Stanley apprenticed with directors Mahendran and Sasi before his directorial debut. After working as an assistant director for twelve years, he made his first film April Maadhathil, a college love story starring Srikanth and Sneha, which became a box office success. His second venture, Pudhukottaiyilirundhu Saravanan featuring Dhanush, became an average grosser with Stanley suggesting the film's story was misunderstood by audiences. He then began work on a film featuring Ravi Krishna, Anjali Devi's granddaughter Saila Rao and Sonia Agarwal for producer Krishnakanth, but financial troubles meant that the film was stalled and Stanley took a sabbatical.

Stanley then worked again with Srikanth in his next two ventures, with the romantic drama Mercury Pookkal releasing first. His last directorial venture Kizhakku Kadarkarai Salai (2006) opened to poor reviews, with a critic noting it was "pathetic" and a "virtually invisible script". Stanley then began to appear in films as an actor, notably playing C. N. Annadurai in the biographical film Periyar (2007).

In early 2015, he planned to make a film titled Adam's Apple for AR Murugadoss's production house and cast Vaibhav and Andrea Jeremiah. However the project eventually did not materialise.

== Death ==
Stanley died on 15 April 2025, at the age of 57, after undergoing treatment at a private hospital for several illnesses.

== Filmography ==
Year	Film	Notes
2002	April Maadhathil	
2004	Pudhukottaiyilirundhu Saravanan	
2006	Mercury Pookkal	
2006	Kizhakku Kadarkarai Salai	

=== As actor ===
- Periyar (2007)
- Raavanan (2010)
- Ninaithathu Yaaro (2014)
- Andavan Kattalai (2016)
- Kadugu (2016)
- Aan Devathai (2018)
- 6 Athiyayam (2018)
- Koothan (2018)
- Sarkar (2018)
- Meendum (2021)
- Bommai Nayagi (2023)
- Maharaja (2024)
