= Roja Kootam =

- Poster
- Directed by: Sasi
- Written by: Sasi
- Produced by: V. Ravichandran
- Starring: Srikanth; Bhumika
- Cinematography: M. V. Panneerselvam
- Edited by: Peter Bhabiyaa
- Music by: Bharadwaj
- Distributed by: Aascar Film Pvt. Ltd
- Release date: 22 February 2002
- Running time: 150 minutes
- Country: India
- Language: Tamil

Roja Kootam (transl. A Bunch of Roses) is a 2002 Indian Tamil-language romance film directed by Sasi. The film stars Srikanth and Bhumika in lead roles. The film's score and soundtrack are composed by Bharadwaj. This was Srikanth's debut movie and catapulted him into stardom. The film was remade in Kannada as Manasina Maathu (2011).

== Plot ==
Ilango and Sriram are best friends. Ilango is his parents' only son, who aren't interested in anything but his academics. However Ilango is not interested in academics and wants to set up business. He falls in love with Manohari, who also eventually happens to reside opposite their house, with her loudmouthed sub-inspector mother. With the responsibilities of a brother to get his sisters married, Sriram leaves for Libya on a job received through Ilango's parents. Before he leaves, he tells Ilango that Mano and himself are in love, and asks Ilango to look after his lover until he is back. Ilango swallows his love secret for the sake of friendship. Meanwhile, Manohari's mother arranges for her to marry Vijay Adhiraj for his wealth. At this juncture, Mano and Ilango lie that they are already married. They both leave their parents, and Ilango starts earning to support Mano. Finishing his job assignment, Sriram returns, only to give yet another family responsibility as an excuse. He apologizes for not being able to marry Mano as he is a tight corner to marry somebody else for the sake of his sister's marriage. Later, Mano leaves to Mumbai after a job opportunity. Ilango's parents learn that he and Mano are not married. They accept them. Radhika knows Mano as the girl Ilango loved, but he would not accept it since Mano might think wrong of him. Later in the train station, things turn plates and Mano learns that she is the girl he loved and accepts him.

== Cast ==
- Srikanth as Ilango
- Bhumika as Manogari aka Mano
- Raghuvaran as Ilango's father
- Radhika as Ilango's mother
- Vivek as Auto Aarumugam
- Raghava Lawrence in the song Suppamma
- Mumtaj in the song Suppamma
- Akash as Sriram
- Devan
- Rekha as Mano's mother
- Vijay Adhiraj as Mano's arranged husband
- Suvarna Mathew as Kiran
- Shanthi Williams as Sriram's mother
- Bava Lakshmanan as Auto Aarumugam's passenger
- Sampath Ram as Police officer
- Mohan Raman as Ilango's boss

== Production ==
In 2001, director Sasi and producer Aascar Ravichandran announced plans of making a romantic film titled Roja Kootam and cast Tarun in the lead role. Following a fallout with the producer, Tarun left the project, with the makers unsuccessfully attempting to bring in either dancer Shobi Paulraj or model Vikranth to play the lead role. After working as a television actor and model, Srikanth was selected to play his first lead role.

During the making of the project, production was stalled several times owing to differences between Sasi and the production studio. Sasi had briefly left the project after Ravichandran made a last-minute decision to cancel a song shoot in New Zealand. "Apple Penne" was initially shot Chikmagalur and Hampi, before Ravichandran asked for a reshoot, suggesting Egypt as a location. The team were later unable to travel to Egypt owing to a passport delay for the lead actress Bhumika Chawla. It was later reshot in Manali, with associate director S. S. Stanley stepping in as a director for the sequence.

== Soundtrack ==
Roja Kootam

Soundtrack album by Bharadwaj
- Released: 2 January 2002
- Genre: Feature film soundtrack
- Length: 36:49
- Label: Star Music
- Producer: Bharadwaj

Bharadwaj chronology
Dhaya (2002)	Roja Kootam (2002)	Gemini (2002)

The soundtrack was composed by Bharadwaj. The songs were received well by the audience and were chartbusters.

S. No.	Song title	Singer(s)	Lyrics	Duration (mins)
1.	"Anna Saalaiyil"	Karthik	Vairamuthu	5:34
2.	"Apple Penne Neeyaaro"	Srinivas	Vairamuthu	5:32
3.	"Azhagin Azhage Nee"	Tippu	Vairamuthu	5:14
4.	"Mottugale Mottugale"	Sadhana Sargam, Hariharan	Vairamuthu	4:57
5.	"Putham Pudhu Rojaave"	P. Unnikrishnan	Vairamuthu	4:55
6.	"Subbammaa"	Malgudi Subha, Manicka Vinayagam	Vairamuthu	5:29
7.	"Uyir Konda Rojaave"	Bharadwaj	Vairamuthu	5:08

== Reception ==
Chennai Online wrote "In his debut film 'Sollamale' Sasi had revealed a lot of promise as a director with novel ideas and a fresh narrative style. But there's only glimpses of it here!". The Hindu wrote "Oscar Films 'Roja Koottam' has a refreshing lead pair — Srikanth and Bhumika. It is a routine romantic sojourn all right but there is an attempt at being different". Cinesouth wrote "The story that proceeds with lots of twists and turns in the first-half, limps pretty badly during the second half due to Sasi's mistakes. [..] The story forcefully reminds one of Shajahan & Poove Unakkaga. sasi's previous 'Sollamalae' had a very strong, uniform screenplay throughout the film. It also had life. But, this film hadn't strained all that much. The story is very predictable during the second half. But, what's tragic is the bumpy ride the film takes in that path. Still, the movie manages to run at a happy, lively pace". Sify wrote "Of the freshers, Srikanth is earnest but Bhoomika is a total let down, while Vijay Adhiraj is better off in television. Vivek`s comedy track has nothing to do with the main narrative. But Bharadwaj has come out with fairly hummable music score. Director Sasi has ruined the film trying to create unbelievable twists in a normal love story".

== Awards ==
2001 - 2002

- ITFA Best New Actor Award - Srikanth
- Film fans association Award for Best Music Director -Bharadwaj
