= Rajapattai =

2011 film by Suseenthiran

- Theatrical release poster
- Directed by: Suseenthiran
- Written by: Bhaskar Sakthi (Dialogues)
- Screenplay by: Suseenthiran
- Story by: Aasim Tiger
- Produced by: Prasad V. Potluri
- Starring: Vikram; Deeksha Seth; K. Viswanath
- Cinematography: R. Madhi
- Edited by: Kasi Viswanathan
- Music by: Yuvan Shankar Raja
- Production company: PVP cinema
- Distributed by: Gemini Film Circuit
- Release date: 23 December 2011 (India)
- Running time: 133 minutes
- Country: India
- Language: Tamil
- Budget: ₹40 crore

Rajapattai (transl. King's path) is a 2011 Indian Tamil-language masala film co-written and directed by Suseenthiran based on a story by Seenu Vasan. The film stars Vikram and Deeksha Seth. The music was composed by Yuvan Shankar Raja, the film is produced by Prasad V. Potluri's newly launched PVP Cinema. The story revolves around the issue of land grabbing and how the protagonist becomes involved in it.

The film was also dubbed into Telugu and was released as Veedinthe on 30 December 2011 and into Hindi as Main Hoon Dada No.1 in 2013.

== Plot ==
'Anul' Murugan, a gym boy who dreams of becoming a successful villain in films, lives along with Shanmugham and his gym co-boys. He bumps into an old man Dakshinamoorthy who is under pressure from his son Chidambaram to sell his orphanage to a scheming lady politician Ranganayaki, who is majorly into land grabbing along with her hatchet man 'Vaappa' Abdul Kadhir. Murugan eventually falls in love with Dharshini. Murugan becomes Dakshinamoorthy's savior as Ranganayaki and her men are after them. How Murugan single-handedly fights Ranganayaki and brings her to light forms the rest of the story.

== Cast ==
- Vikram as Anal Murugan
- Deeksha Seth as Dharshini
- K. Viswanath as Dakshanamurthy
- Pradeep Rawat as Abdul Kadhir alias Vaappa
- Shanoor Sana as Ranganayaki alias Akka
- Avinash as Chidambaram
- Thambi Ramaiah as Shanmugham
- Yogi Babu as Azhagu
- Thalaivasal Vijay as Director
- Chaams as Funny Actor
- Aruldoss as goon
- Narsing Yadav as goon
- Mayilsamy as watchman
- Theepetti Ganesan as Vethala
- Jayaprakash in a guest appearance
- Saloni Aswani as an item number ("Viladhi Villain")
- Shriya Saran as an item number ("Laddu Laddu Rendu Laddu")
- Reema Sen as an item number ("Laddu Laddu Rendu Laddu")
- Anal Arasu as himself

== Production ==
=== Development ===
In early 2007, it was reported that director Boopathy Pandian would direct a film written by his assistant, Seenu Vasan, with Ajith Kumar expected to play the lead role. The film was briefly postponed as Ajith had to complete his remaining projects and soon Boopathy Pandian confirmed otherwise and revealed that the film would actually be made by Rajakaliamman Films with Vikram and Nayantara in the lead roles. However Vikram's commitment to Kanthaswamy and Raavanan resulted in the film eventually becoming shelved. In late 2010, Vikram was forced to pull out of his film with director Selvaraghavan after the project was shelved too and gave dates to a new venture produced by the same studio, for a film to be directed by Suseenthiran. Reports emerged that the film would be titled Vendhan, but this was dismissed by the director. The director initially wanted to experiment with a new script but to make use of the actor's tight schedules he chose to use Seenu's original script. The new title of the film, "Rajapattai" was eventually released in May 2011, with the first schedule planned to begin in early June. A first press meet was held on 6 June 2011 with the entire crew being present. Kanakaratna Ramesh was to produce the film, however his teenage sons Pratish and Santosh were eventually revealed to be producers, launching their own banner named SP Creations. Suseenthiran disclosed that the film would be a "full-fledged commercial" masala film, with action, comedy and romance, further adding that the dialogues would be penned by Bhaskar Sakthi. By September 2011, reports confirmed that the film had been taken over by Prasad V. Potluri's PVP Cinemas, after Ramesh faced financial restraints.

=== Casting ===
Reports suggested that the film would depict the relationship between a grandfather, played by K. Vishwanath and his grandson played by Vikram. Furthermore, the film was supposed to feature Vikram in dual roles as father and son, however the news was denied by sources, which confirmed that Vikram was to essay dual roles initially, but since the script had been reworked, he would play only one character. Vikram was revealed to play a stunt man who aspires to become a noted villain in the film industry, with the makers adding that his character had negative shades. In March 2011, Deeksha Seth confirmed her presence in the film, citing that she would portray the leading female role of an IT professional. For a parallel lead female role, Amala Paul was signed on, but was forced to pull out due to schedule problems. Sources reported that Mithra Kurian was then signed on for the film for her second big Tamil venture after Kaavalan, after discussions with Abhinaya were unsuccessful. However, the reports turned out to be false. Pradeep Rawat, best known for his performance in Ghajini, was selected to play the main antagonist in the film. Actresses Shriya Saran and Reemma Sen, who had both worked together with Vikram earlier, were roped in to perform an item number together, after attempts to sign Hansika Motwani, who was reportedly offered ₹ 12 million for the role, had failed. In late October, National Film Award-winner Thambi Ramaiah as well as cinematographer-turned-actor Aruldass, who had also played a pivotal role in the director's Naan Mahaan Alla, were roped in for other supporting roles. Suseenthiran also confirmed that he would rejoin with the Naan Mahaan Alla crew, with Yuvan Shankar Raja, R. Madhi and Mu. Kasi Viswanathan taking care of the music, cinematography and editing, respectively.

=== Filming ===
Filming began in June 2011, with the first schedule, during which filming was held in and around Chennai, lasting for 60 days. In August 2011, the first song was shot for five days in Mahabalipuram, with Vikram, Deeksha Seth and fifty back-up dancers participating. The team subsequently shot scenes in a set worth ₹ 4 million that was erected at Senthil Studios in Saligramam, Chennai, while the next schedule was to be shot in Thiruvannaamalai and Pondicherry. In October 2011, filming was held near the Ramachandra Medical College in Chennai. Few days later, the crew was shooting a song and several stunt sequences near Karaikudi, and later in Kumbakonam. The climax scene that was canned for eight days at the Binny Mills in Chennai, had reportedly cost approximately ₹ 30 million. During the last week of October and early November, Saloni Aswani, who had previously starred in Madurai Veeran, was shooting for the song "Villadhi Villain" along with Vikram at the AVM Studios, Chennai. The item number, featuring Shriya Saran and Reemma Sen, was initially to be filmed in Japan, however, since Suseenthiran was not satisfied with the locations, he decided to can it in Lucca, Italy. Other locations in Italy where filming was held include Volterra, Monteriggioni and Montecatini Terme.

== Music ==
Rajapattai's score and soundtrack are composed by Yuvan Shankar Raja, becoming his first work for a Vikram-starrer. The album's Telugu version was launched first on 21 November 2011 at Taj Deccan in Hyderabad, Andhra Pradesh. The original Tamil version was released two days later at the Anna Centenary Auditorium in Kotturpuram, Chennai.

== Release ==
In early November 2011, reports confirmed that Sun Pictures had bought the domestic distribution rights of the film. However two weeks later, Sun Pictures cancelled the deal and opted out. Subsequently, Gemini Film Circuit acquired the theatrical release rights, confirming the film' release for the Christmas weekend on 23 December 2011. The Telugu version would be released one week later, distributed by Suresh Movies.

== Reception ==
=== Critical response ===
Behindwoods gave the film 2.5 out of 5 and wrote that it was "only for Vikram's fans and action lovers" and also stated 'Rajapattai is popcorn in its flavor'. Pavithra Srinivasan from Rediff described the film as bland, adding that it was "just an actor's quest for superstardom, and is a disappointing fare", giving it 2 out of 5. Sify wrote: "This old-fashioned masala entertainer is enjoyable in parts. It is vintage Vikram coupled with rich production values that makes Rajapattai watchable, despite its obvious flaws". CNN-IBN rated 2 out of 5 and wrote that it was a "road unfit to travel". Chennaionline noted: "Had Suseenthiran managed to keep an element of suspense somewhere in the script, the film could have been more watchable".
