= Asalem Jarigindi =

- Release poster
- Directed by: NVR
- Written by: Vasu (dialogues)
- Produced by: Myneni Neelima Choudary; King Johnson Koyyada
- Starring: Sriram; Sanchita Padukone
- Cinematography: NVR
- Edited by: Maddali Kishore
- Music by: Yelandhar Mahaveer (songs); S. Chinna (score)
- Production company: Exodus Media
- Release date: 22 October 2021
- Country: India
- Language: Telugu

Asalem Jarigindi (transl. What really happened?) is a 2021 Indian Telugu-language suspense thriller film directed by NVR and starring Sriram and Sanchita Padukone. The film was released on 22 October 2021.

== Plot ==
A woman leaves food inside a forest as part of a ritual and a mysterious man is seen eating the food.

Shiva, a veterinarian, arrives at a village for a free medical camp. Shiva and Kanna decide to stay in Shiva's friend's house till the medical camp ends. Shiva falls in love with his friend's sister. Shiva fights off some guys to save his friend while buying local liquor. The mysterious man digs a grave in the grave yard and a young man commits suicide. The mysterious man has sex with a young girl while she is asleep. The next day, a priest asks the young girl's family to leave the house to prevent a death.

Shiva's friend is Mahesh, Sarala is Mahesh's mother who runs a shop and chit fund business and Priya is Mahesh's sister. Priya's father is in a coma.

Many villagers including Kanna and a police officer die after drinking the local liquor which was poisoned. On a new moon night, Sarala leaves food inside a forest as part of a ritual and the mysterious man eats the food but Sarala can't see the mysterious man. Sarala runs in fear and falls to her death. Shiva consoles Priya. The villagers, who deposited money in Sarala's chit fund, demand their money back. Sarala's spirit informs Priya about the place where Sarala hid the money. Priya finds and gives the money back to the villagers. The mysterious man arrives and touches Priya but no one can see the mysterious man. The villagers discuss the recent deaths with a priest and the priest tells the villagers about similar events that happened 20 years ago.

In a flashback, Ramesh along with his friends disrespects a group of dancers. On a new moon night, another priest kills one of the dancers while leads to his wife committing suicide leaving her child alone.

At present, the priest asks the villagers to perform a ritual on a new moon night. The mysterious man arrives at Priya's house and chases Priya through the streets tackling the villagers. The mysterious man attacks Shiva and tries to take Priya but the mysterious man accidentally catches on fire. The mysterious man kills Ramesh.

The next day, the priest explains to the villagers about Karkotakan who was the other priest from the flashback. The child who was left alone in the flashback is revealed to be the mysterious man. The child had witnessed his parents' death and later killed Karkotakan. The child studied black magic using Karkotakan's book through which the child gained invisibility. The priest explains a way to see and kill the mysterious man. Based on the information from the priest, Shiva acquires Naga Dandam and the power to see the mysterious man. While Shiva fights the mysterious man, the invisibility wears off and the villagers are able to see the mysterious man. Shiva kills the mysterious man using the Naga Dandam.

== Cast ==
- Sriram as Shiva
- Sanchita Padukone
- Ravi Kumar
- Chandu Koduri as Mahesh
- Karunya Chowdary

== Production ==
The film is based on real incidents that happened in Telangana during the 1970s and 1980s. The film began production in February of 2019 and was shot in Hyderabad and Telangana villages using a MONSTRO 8K VV camera. The film was sixty percent complete in March of 2019. Shooting finished in April of 2019. The makers were contemplating an OTT release in 2020.

== Soundtrack ==
The songs were composed by Yelandhar Mahaveer. The music was released under the Aditya Music label.

Track listing
No.	Title	Lyrics	Singer(s)	Length
1.	"Vennela Chirunavvayi"	Chirauri Vijaykumar	Vijay Prakash	4:03
2.	"Mammaare Kallu"	Chirauri Vijaykumar	Ramky	3:31
3.	"Ninnu Choodakunda"	Challa Bhagyalakshmi	Yazin Nizar, Malavika	4:01
4.	"Akkada Ikkada Ekkadayina"	Chirauri Vijaykumar	Barghavi Pillai, Shivapriya	3:30
5.	"Ningiloni Chandamaama"	Venkatesh	Vijay Yesudas	4:47
Total length:				19:52
