= Mirugaa =

2021 Indian film

- Theatrical release poster
- Directed by: J. Parthiban
- Written by: M. V. Panneerselvam
- Produced by: B. Vinod Jain
- Starring: Srikanth; Raai Laxmi
- Cinematography: M. V. Panneerselvam
- Edited by: R. Sudharsan
- Music by: Aruldev
- Production company: Jaguar Studios
- Distributed by: Zee Studios
- Release date: 5 March 2021
- Running time: 127 minutes
- Country: India
- Language: Tamil

Mirugaa (transl. Animal) is a 2021 Tamil-language action thriller film directed by debutant J. Parthiban and produced by Vinod Jain. The film stars Srikanth and Raai Laxmi. Produced by Jaguar Studios, it was released on 5 March 2021. The film received mixed reviews from critics who criticized the screenplay, VFX, predictability and execution.

== Plot ==
John D'Soza (Srikanth) is a serial killer who marries wealthy single mothers for their money. Once the women discover his true nature, he kills the entire family, steals their wealth and disappears. After his latest killing, he changes his name to Arvind and goes on the run but is involved in a traffic accident.

Lakshmi (Raai Laxmi) is a single mother and millionaire businesswoman who owns a large conglomerate, including a tea factory. A wild tiger has been roaming the nearby forest, attacking some of her factory workers and terrorizing the area. Arvind approaches Lakshmi. By playing the role of a kind and caring man, he successfully befriends Lakshmi, who then appoints him as her factory manager.

A flashback reveals that after his accident, Arvind (then still John) woke up in the home of Subhadra (Vaishnavi Chandran), who introduced herself as his neighbor. She showed him video footage of him killing his previous family and revealed that she is Lakshmi's estranged sister. Due to her reckless lifestyle, their father had disowned her and made Lakshmi the sole heir to the family business. Subhadra blackmailed John, demanding that he kill Lakshmi in exchange for keeping his secret. This was his true motive for approaching her.

Lakshmi later falls in love with Arvind and marries him, then promotes him to managing director, granting him partial inheritance rights to the business. However, Subhadra grows impatient that Lakshmi is still alive. Meeting Arvind at a hotel, she is told that Lakshmi's wealth is far greater than they had estimated. Arvind proposes killing her only after gaining full control of the business, promising to make Subadhra his partner. Intoxicated and under the influence of drugs, Subhadra reveals that the memory card containing the incriminating footage is hidden beneath the skin of her abdomen. Arvind kills her and retrieves the card.

Sometime later, Arvind sees a TV news report that police have solved his previous murder case and identified him. Panicking, he accidentally signs a cheque using his old name, “John,” instead of “Arvind.” Lakshmi's secretary Daisy notices the mistake and along with other suspicious clues, begins to suspect criminal activity. She blackmails Arvind for 50% of his illicit earnings. Arvind kills Daisy. Daisy's murder is investigated by police officer Vijay (Dev Gill), Lakshmi's close friend. Vijay finds the cheque in her bra and, confused by the unfamiliar name, investigates further. He concludes that Arvind is the prime suspect and calls Lakshmi, asking her to keep him at the house until he arrives. However, Arvind has been secretly tapping Lakshmi's phone and learns of the plan.

While Vijay is still on the way, Arvind attacks Lakshmi and her sister Nithya. He injects anesthesia to them and confesses his whole story to them. He then releases the tiger, which he reveals that he captured earlier using Subhadara's body as bait, into the house and locks it from outside. The tiger does not attack them at first, which gives them time to wake up and run. The film then enters its climax with Lakshmi, Nithya, and Lakshmi's daughter Mithoo trying to hide from a roaming tiger in a sealed house.

Outside the house, Arvind stops Vijay and the two engage in a fight. Arvind then kills Vijay. After a few hours, Arvind goes back to the house to check the situation. He sees Lakshmi lying in blood on the floor, believing that the tiger has killed her, so he opens the door. However, it is revealed that Lakshmi is not dead, but injured. She rises and fights with Arvind. Just then, the tiger attacks kills Arvind. Lakshmi uses this chance to escape with Nithya and Mithoo, after locking the tiger inside.

== Cast ==
- Srikanth as John a.k.a. Aravind
- Raai Laxmi as Lakshmi
- Dev Gill as ACP Vijay
- Naira Shah as Nithya
- Vaishnavi Chandran as Subadhra
- Abhishek Shankar as Police Commissioner
- Aarohi Anisha
- Pooja Ram
- Black Pandi
- Venkat Subha
- Lalith
- Dhruv
- Naan Ram
- Dwitha S
- Ishita
- Shawkath
- Sivaram
- Anantharamakrishnan
- Pon Suresh
- Senthil
- A. K. Sasidharan
- Suresh
- Williams
- Laxmee
- Meena
- Anitha Sampath

== Production ==
Srikanth and Raai Laxmi began working on the film in December 2018, teaming up for a "graphics-heavy" film written by noted cinematographer M. V. Panneerselvam and directed by debutant J. Parthiban. The film was shot throughout 2019 in cities including Pollachi, Munnar, Thalaikona, Ooty and Kodaikanal. The climax was shot in Mani Mahal in Chennai. The makers promoted the film by revealing that a tiger would play a pivotal role.

The film's trailer was released by actor Dhanush, Arya, Vijay Antony and Bharath on 5 February 2021.

== Release ==
The film was released across theatres in Tamil Nadu on 5 March 2021. A critic from Times of India wrote, "The attempt to hold the attention of viewers with a tiger in the film's pre-climax and climax portions is laudable, but the below par VFX couldn't do justice to it". A critic from Cinema Express noted the film has a "predictable screenplay, poor execution, budgetary limitations and unfeasible VFX technology, which hinder this serial killer film". Dinamalar gave the film a mixed review, concluding that the film was a missed opportunity.
