= All the Best (film) =

- Film poster
- Directed by: J. D. Chakravarthy
- Written by: J. D. Chakravarthy; Krishna Mohan Challa (dialogues)
- Produced by: G. Sambasiva Rao
- Starring: Srikanth; J. D. Chakravarthy; Sidhika Sharma; Rao Ramesh; Anisha Singh
- Cinematography: G. Siva Kumar
- Edited by: Venkatesh
- Music by: Hemachandra (songs); Sai Karthik (score)
- Production company: Sudha Cinema
- Release date: 29 June 2012
- Country: India
- Language: Telugu

All the Best is a 2012 Indian Telugu-language comedy film written and directed by J. D. Chakravarthy. The film stars Srikanth, J. D. Chakravarthy and Sidhika Sharma in lead roles. The film was released on 29 June 2012 with mixed reviews. Later this film was dubbed into Hindi as Risk. The film is a remake of the Malayalam film Gulumaal: The Escape, which itself is based on the 2000 Argentine movie Nine Queens.

== Cast ==
- Srikanth as Ravi
- J. D. Chakravarthy as Chandu
- Sidhika Sharma as Lucky
- Anisha Singh as Upasana
- Janaki Sabesh as Annapurna, Chandu's mother
- Suhasini Maniratnam as Snehalatha, Ravi's mother
- Giri Babu as Rama Chandra Murthy
- Chandra Mohan as Chandram, Chandu's father
- Kota Srinivasa Rao as Kishtayya, Ravi's father
- Brahmanandam as Gochi Savithri
- Raghu Babu as SI Patvardhan Patel
- Brahmaji as Machiraju
- Krishna Bhagavaan as Sharma
- Pradeep Rawat as Razak
- Rao Ramesh as Babji
- Ranganath
- Jeeva
- Raghu Karumanchi as Police Constable
- Suthivelu
- Y. Vijaya as Chamundeswaeri Devi
- Telangana Shakuntala as Waheeda Rahman
- Pragathi

== Soundtrack ==
All the Best

Soundtrack album by Hemachandra
- Released: 3 June 2012
- Recorded: 2012
- Genre: Film soundtrack
- Length: 21:08
- Language: Telugu
- Label: Aditya Music

The soundtrack was composed by singer turned composer Hemachandra and the album was released under Aditya Music label. The audio of the films was launched on 3 June 2012 at Dasapalla Hotel in Hyderabad with Dasari Narayana Rao as the chief guest. All the songs in the album were written by Geetha Poonik.

Tracklist
No.	Title	Artist(s)	Length
1.	"Sundari Tingaari"	Hemachandra, Rita, Pranavi	3:46
2.	"All The Best"	N. C. Karunya, Noel, Bindu Ramakrishna, Aditya	3:48
3.	"Thuogoji Pagoji - 1"	L. R. Eswari, Mano	3:31
4.	"Lammi Lammi"	Sunil Kashyap, Kajal	3:18
5.	"Sana Sana"	Hemachandra, Monisha	3:14
6.	"Thuogoji Pagoji - 2"	Priya Himesh, Mano	3:31
Total length:			21:08

== Reception ==
A critic from The Times of India rated the film 2/5 stars and wrote, "There is nothing much to write about the other departments for they are all a little too run of the mill" Jeevi of Idlebrain.com wrote, "The film has every thing in right place, but the director’s inability get the timing right marred the over all impact of the movie".
