= Deeksha Seth =

Indian actress (born 1990)

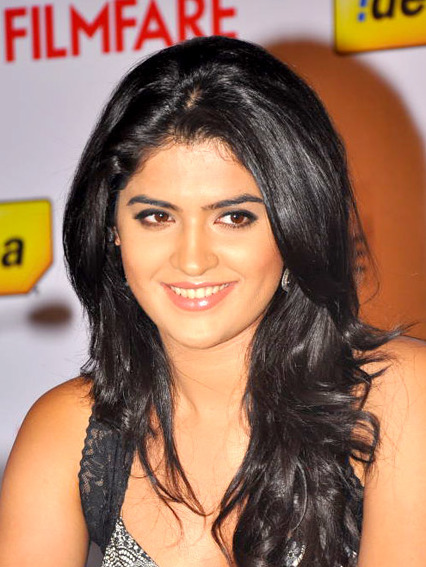
- Seth in 2012
- Born: Deeksha Seth; 14 February 1990 (age 36); Delhi, India
- Education: Mayo College Girls School
- Occupations: Actress; Model; producer; dancer; artist; director
- Years active: 2009–2021
- Height: 1.77 m (5 ft 9 1/2 in)

Deeksha Seth (born 14 February 1990) is an Indian actress and model who mainly worked in Telugu and Tamil-language films and was a finalist at Femina Miss India 2009. She made her acting debut in the Telugu film Vedam (2010).

== Early life ==
Seth was born on 14 February 1990 on Delhi. Since her father was working for ITC Limited and was often transferred, her family has been shifting regularly and living in various parts of India, including Mumbai, Chennai, Kolkata, Rajasthan, Gujarat and Uttar Pradesh as well as in Kathmandu, Nepal. She finished her nursery and schooling up to third class in Chennai, and enrolled at a college in Mumbai.

== Career ==
During her first year at college in 2009, she was spotted by a Femina Miss India contest scout during an NSS event, who persuaded her into modeling and to participate at the beauty pageant. She created a portfolio with the help of a friend of her father, and competed in the contest. In spite of her lack of modeling experience, she was one of the top 10 finalists, winning the Fresh Face title.

During a modeling assignment in Hyderabad, the casting director of the Telugu film Vedam by Krish, had spotted her. She was cast for the role of Pooja, the rich girlfriend of the lead character Cable Raju (portrayed by Allu Arjun), after 70 girls were rejected by the makers, citing that she "loved the script and decided to give it a shot". Vedam, an anthology drama film, opened to high critical acclaim, winning accolades at various award functions. In quick succession, she signed two more films, with Mirapakay releasing nex., Two weeks later after Mirapakaay, the action drama Wanted with Gopichand, which constituted her debut as a lead female character. She has been signed for three more Telugu projects, Rebel alongside Prabhas and Tamannaah, Nippu opposite Ravi Teja again, and the socio-fantasy film Uu Kodathara? Ulikki Padathara? She was also cast for two Tamil films, Suseenthiran's Rajapattai with Vikram, as well as Vettai Mannan, scheduled to release in 2013.

== Filmography ==
Year	Film	Role	Language	Notes
2010	Vedam	Pooja	Telugu	
2011	Mirapakaay	Vaishali	Telugu	
2011	Wanted	Nandhini	Telugu	
2011	Rajapattai	Dharshini	Tamil	
2012	Nippu	Meghana	Telugu	
2012	Uu Kodathara? Ulikki Padathara?	Jagadha	Telugu	
2012	Rebel	Deepali	Telugu	
2014	Lekar Hum Deewana Dil	Karishma Shetty	Hindi	
2016	Jaggu Dada	Gowri	Kannada	
2021	Saat Kadam	Kiran	Hindi	Final project; Web series
