= Sanchita Padukone =

Indian actress (born 1988)

Sanchitha Padukone
- Born: 16 March 1988 (age 38); Kundapura, Karnataka, India
- Occupation: Actress
- Years active: 2009–present

Sanchitha Padukone is an Indian actress, who works in Kannada, Telugu, and Tamil films.

== Career ==
Sanchita Padukone began her career with the Kannada film Ravana (2009), the Kannada remake of Kaadhal Kondein (2003). She described the original film as one of her favorites. She made her lead Tamil debut with Pillaiyar Theru Kadaisi Veedu (2011) for which she felt it was difficult to learn Tamil and spoke to the cast and crew only in the language. That same year, she worked on Samy's unreleased film Chithiram. She played a NRI from Germany in the comedy film Satya Harishchandra (2017).

== Filmography ==
Year	Film	Role	Language	Notes
2009	Ravana	Divya	Kannada	
2009	Vettaikaaran	Uma	Tamil	
2011	Pillaiyar Theru Kadaisi Veedu	Sandhya	Tamil	
2015	Chammak Challo	Anshu	Telugu	
2015	Manoharam	Anu	Telugu	
2017	Satya Harishchandra	Saanvi	Kannada	
2018	Raambo 2	Herself	Kannada	Cameo appearance
2018	Rachayitha	Padmavathi	Telugu	
2019	Muttukumara		Kannada	
2021	Asalem Jarigindi		Telugu	
