= Wanted (2011 film) =

2011 Indian Telugu language action film

- Movie Poster
- Directed by: B. V. S. Ravi
- Written by: B. V. S. Ravi
- Produced by: V. Ananda Prasad
- Starring: Gopichand; Deeksha Seth
- Cinematography: Rasool Ellore
- Edited by: Shankar
- Music by: Chakri
- Production company: Bhavya Creations
- Release date: 26 January 2011
- Running time: 148 minutes
- Country: India
- Language: Telugu

Wanted is a 2011 Indian Telugu-language action comedy film written and directed by B.V.S.Ravi and produced by V. Ananda Prasad on Bhavya Creations banner. It stars Gopichand and Deeksha Seth, alongside an ensemble supporting cast including Prakash Raj, Nassar, Chandra Mohan, Jayasudha, Brahmanandam, Subbaraju, Ali, Ahuti Prasad, Raghu Babu and Shafi. The music was composed by Chakri with cinematography by Rasool Ellore. The film released on 26 January 2011.

== Plot ==
Ram Babu is the only son of a couple: Ram Babu and Janaki. The parents have earned so much for their son to lead a happy life without doing any work. In simple, Ram Babu is a vagabond with no work other than roaming on roads with his batch. All of a sudden, he meets Nandini, a house surgeon who saves Janaki's life when she had a severe heart attack. From the very next moment, Ram Babu falls in love with Nandini to chase her everywhere and make her accept his love, but she never reciprocates. A frustrated Ram Babu beats up goons when they tease Nandini and asks her what else he can do in order to win her love. Nandini shocks Ram Babu by asking him to kill the local drug don Basava Reddy and his family members to win her hand. With no logics, Ram Babu sets on the action scenes, but Nandini's flashback is revealed by the commissioner. Nandini is the daughter of an undercover cop named Raghunath, and her entire family is killed in the hands of Basava Reddy. Because of this, she is on a revenge spree, taking process and using Ram Babu as her weapon. How Ram Babu finished Nandini's task and how Nandini developed a bond of love in this process form rest of the story.

== Cast ==
- Gopichand as Ram Babu
- Deeksha Seth as Nandini
- Prakash Raj as Basava Reddy
- Nassar as Raghunath
- Giri Babu as Rama Chandra Murthy
- Chandra Mohan as Ram Babu
- Jayasudha as Janaki
- Brahmanandam as Nandagopal / Nandu
- Subbaraju as Shiva, Basava's younger brother
- Ali in a cameo appearance
- Ahuti Prasad as Commissioner
- Raghu Babu as Raghu, Ram Babu's friend
- Shafi as Raja
- Banerjee as Basava's brother-in-law
- Praveen as Ram Babu's friend
- Prabhas Sreenu as Chari
- Satyam Rajesh as Satyam, Ram Babu's friend
- Giridhar as Basava Reddy's henchmen
- Raavi Kondala Rao
- Duvvasi Mohan as Duvvasi, Raghu's friend

== Soundtrack ==
The music is composed by Chakri and was released on Aditya Music. Wanted had its audio launch at Ramanaidu Studios. Prabhas had unveiled the first copy of the CD and presented it to actress Jayasudha.

All lyrics are written by Bhaskarabhatla Ravi Kumar.

Track-List
No.	Title	Singer(s)	Length
1.	"Arakilo Pogaru"	Ranjith	4.46
2.	"Yevo Pichhi Veshalu"	Javed Ali	5.23
3.	"Dil Mera Dhak Dhak"	Udit Narayan, Smita	4:48
4.	"Cheppana Cheppana"	Chakri, Kousalya	5:36
5.	"A for Angel"	Krishna Chaithanya, M. M. Srilekha	3:48
Total length:			24:21

== Release ==
The film released on 26 January 2011. The film was later dubbed in Hindi as Jaanbaaz Ki Jung and in Tamil as Vengai Puli.
