= Sollamale =

- Poster
- Directed by: Sasi
- Written by: Sasi
- Produced by: R. B. Choudary
- Starring: Livingston; Kausalya
- Cinematography: Arthur A. Wilson
- Edited by: V. Jaishankar
- Music by: Bobby
- Production company: Super Good Films
- Release date: 1 August 1998
- Running time: 158 minutes
- Country: India
- Language: Tamil

Sollamale (/ˈsoʊllɑːmə.leɪ/ transl. Without Saying) is a 1998 Indian Tamil-language romantic drama film written and directed by Sasi in his directorial debut. The film stars Livingston and Kausalya while Karan, Vivek, Anand, and Prakash Raj play supporting roles. It was released on 1 August 1998 and became a box office success. The film was later remade in Telugu by the same director as Seenu (1999) and in Hindi as Pyaar Diwana Hota Hai (2002).

== Plot ==
Nataraj is an honest, not-too-good-looking, village artist who comes to the city to find a job. He ends up being a banner artist. Shweta is a US citizen who loves India and its culture and stays with her relatives to learn Bharatanatyam. She is a soft-natured, loving girl who loves to help people in distress but cannot stand it if anyone lies or cheats. Initially when these two meet, she mistakes Nataraj to be a mute and pities him. Shweta's occasional friendlier association with Nataraj, in the means of helping, gradually blossoms into love. By this time, it is too late for the guilt-ridden Nataraj to disclose the truth as he feared the risk of losing her. Despite all his efforts to reveal the truth, Shwetha discovers his sham by herself. However at the end, she realises Nataraj's true intentions for acting as a mute and forgives him. However at the climax, when Shwetha asks Nataraj to speak to her, he keeps silent because he had asked a doctor to cut his tongue so that he could be the Nataraj that Swetha had come to love.

== Cast ==
- Livingston as Nataraj
- Kausalya as Shweta
- Karan as Vikram
- Vivek as Wilson
- Anand as Riyaz
- Sakthi Kumar as Vaiyapuri
- Prakash Raj as Dr. Surya Prakash
- Dhamu as Shanmugam, painter
- Vaiyapuri as Painter
- Fathima Babu as Vikram's mother
- Mohan Ram as Vikram's father
- Lavanya as Shweta's friend
- Crane Manohar as Hairdresser
- Bava Lakshmanan
- M. J. Shriram as Advertising agency owner
- Raju Sundaram in a special appearance
- Kalyan in a special appearance in the song "Rathirida Roundadida"
- Alphonsa in a special appearance in the song "Rathirida Roundadida"
- Kanal Kannan as Coconut Seller (special appearance)
- S. Sathyendra as Cobbler (uncredited)

== Production ==
The story of Sollamale was written by Sasi with Prabhu Deva intended for the lead role, but R. B. Chowdary successfully suggested Livingston instead. The original climax was supposed to have the lead characters uniting together; however, Sasi suggested a new climax in which Livingston's character cuts off his tongue.

== Soundtrack ==
Soundtrack was composed by debutant Bobby.

Song	Singers
"Columbus Kaadhalaa"	Mano
"Sollathae"	Hariharan, Chitra
"Chindamaniye Vaa"	S. P. Balasubrahmanyam
"Sollu Chollu"	Bobby, Chitra
"Rathirida Roundadida"	Sabesh
"Sollathae"	Hariharan

== Reception ==
D. S. Ramanujam of The Hindu wrote, "Debutant director Sasi makes his bow in grand style with a different kind of love tale" and also lauded the performances of Livingston and Kausalya. The film became a major success and breakthrough for Livingston after years of playing supporting roles. Bobby won the Tamil Nadu State Film Award for Best Music Director.
