= Sridevi Ashok =

Indian actress

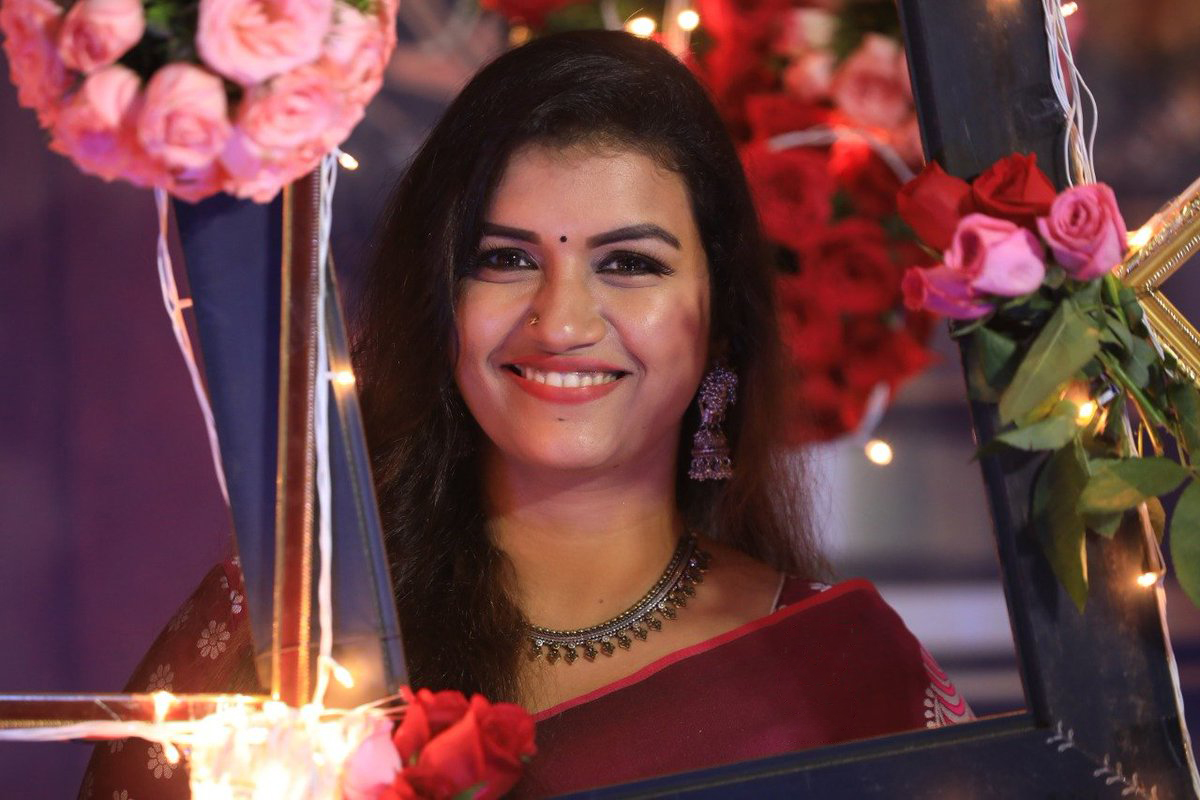
- Occupation: Actress
- Years active: 2008-present
- Spouse: Ashok

Sridevi Ashok is an Indian actress who has worked in Tamil television. She made her debut in Pudhukottaiyilirundhu Saravanan.

== Personal life ==
Her parents are Selvaraj and Roopa.

She attended the A.V. Meiyappan School in Chennai. Sridevi earned a Master of Business Administration degree at Anna University, before becoming a television actress.

She is married to Ashoka Chintala, and the couple have a daughter.

== Career ==
She appeared in Chellamadi Nee Enakku and in Thangam. She was later in Kalyana Parisu Season 1.

== Filmography ==
Year	Film	Role	Notes
2004	Pudhukottaiyilirundhu Saravanan	Selvi	Debut film
2006	Kizhakku Kadarkarai Salai	Devi	

== Television ==
Year	Title	Role	Language	Channel	Notes
2007–2008	Chellamadi Nee Enakku	Meena	Tamil	Sun TV	Replaced Sandhya Jagarlamudi
2009	Kasthuri	Sophia	Tamil	Sun TV	
2009	Vairanenjam	Madhavi	Tamil	Kalaignar TV	
2010	Ilavarasi	Leela	Tamil	Sun TV	
2010–2013	Thangam	Rama Devi	Tamil	Sun TV	Replaced Sandra Amy
2010	Maanada Mayilada	Contestant	Tamil	Kalaignar TV	Dance show
2011	Ammayi Kaapuram	Supraja	Telugu	Gemini TV	
2011	Pirivom Santhippom	Sangeetha	Tamil	Star Vijay	
2011	Iru Malargal		Tamil	Jaya TV	
2012	My Name Is Mangamma	Nikitha	Tamil	Zee Tamil	
2012	Ala Modalayindhi	Supraja	Telugu	Gemini TV	
2013	Vani Rani	Shenbagam	Tamil	Sun TV	
2013	Sivasankari	Malli	Tamil	Sun TV	
2013	Chithiram Pesuthadi	Manimehalai	Tamil	Jaya TV	
2014–2017	Kalyana Parisu	Subulakshmi (Subbu)	Tamil	Sun TV	Season 1 Lead Actress
2015–2016	Annakodiyum Aindhu Pengalum	Manohari	Tamil	Zee Tamil	
2016–2017	Kalyanam Mudhal Kadhal Varai	Swapna	Tamil	Star Vijay	
2017–2018	Poove Poochudava	Dharini	Tamil	Zee Tamizh	
2017–2018	Sembaruthi	Nandhini	Tamil	Zee Tamizh	
2017–2019	Raja Rani	Archana	Tamil	Star Vijay	
2019	Nila	Venmathi	Tamil	Sun TV	
2019	Aranmanai Kili		Tamil	Star Vijay	
2020	Bommukutty Ammavukku	Ratna	Tamil	Star Vijay	
2020–2021	Poove Unakkaga	Dhanalakshmi	Tamil	Sun TV	
2021–2023	Kaatrukenna Veli	Shyamala Devi	Tamil	Star Vijay	
2021–2023	Thalattu	Mayuri	Tamil	Sun TV	
2023–2025	Ponni	Usha	Tamil	Star Vijay	
2023–2024	Modhalum Kaadhalum	Nandhini	Tamil	Star Vijay	Replaced Ramya Ramakrishna and Replaced by Krithikaa Laddu
2026–present	Iru Malargal	Seetha	Tamil	Sun TV	
