= Mercury Pookkal =

- Poster
- Directed by: S. S. Stanley
- Written by: S. S. Stanley
- Produced by: Aaradhana Reddy
- Starring: Srikanth; Meera Jasmine
- Cinematography: Ramesh Babu
- Edited by: Anil Malnad
- Music by: Songs: Karthik Raja; Background score Bala Bharathi
- Production company: Vijaya Productions
- Release date: 17 March 2006
- Country: India
- Language: Tamil

Mercury Pookkal (transl. Mercury flowers) is a 2006 Indian Tamil-language romantic drama film written and directed by S. S. Stanley, starring Srikanth and Meera Jasmine. The film was released on 12 March 2006.

== Plot ==
Karthik, is from a middle-class family and is doing his MCA final year. He is an outstanding student with high ambitions. He works part-time in a courier company and takes care of his expenses. He also yearns for beautiful classy girls. Anbu Selvi is from a rural landlord's family and is doing her B.Com in Trichy. Her pranks and her outgoing personality makes her father Rathnam fear that she might bring disrepute to the family name and so he decides to give her in marriage to his friend's son, Karthik.

Both the youngsters try to resist marriage but are compelled to agree in the end. The unwilling couple make an agreement on the first night that they will play according to the elders' tune for a while and once they are capable of taking care of themselves, they can part their own ways. Anbu is also admitted to the same college as Karthik and the turn of events makes Anbu realise the importance of a good married life and how she has to make her husband like her. In spite of her attempts, Karthik remains elusive and after some frames he also realises the meaning of a good wedded life. When he is about to expose his love, turn of events separate the couple. But the couple stay determined to unite despite the stubborn stance of both their fathers. After much drama they unite happily.

== Cast ==
- Srikanth as Karthik
- Meera Jasmine as Anbu Selvi
- Sameksha as Nisha
- Karunas as Karthik's friend
- Delhi Ganesh as Karthik's father
- Mahadevan as Rathnam
- S. N. Lakshmi as Anbu Selvi's grandmother
- Sneha Nambiar as Karthik's sister-in-law
- Anjali Devi as Karthik's mother

Uncredited

- Irfan as Nisha's lover
- K. Sivasankar as wedding guest
- Rangammal as flower seller

== Soundtrack ==
The soundtrack was by Karthik Raja, while lyrics were written by Pa. Vijay. The audio was released on 15 February 2006 at Vijaya Garden Auditorium.

Track listing
No.	Title	Singer(s)	Length
1.	"Jaladheepam"	Shruti Pathak, Karthik
2.	"Malarvaai"	Sukhwinder Singh, Bobbie
3.	"Mugurtha Neram"	Feji Mani, Ganga, Kunal Ganjawala, Hamsika Iyer
4.	"Pachakiliye"	Shankar Mahadevan, Priya
5.	"Solla Vaarthaigal" (II)	Shreya Ghoshal, Karthik Raja
6.	"Solla Vaarthaigal" (I)	Ganga, Udit Narayan, Hariharan

== Release and reception ==
Mercury Pookkal was advertised as a film "like Missiamma". S Sudha of Rediff.com wrote "The simple plot had all the potential to be a great film. But Stanly [..] stumbles in the narration and comes up with a pathetic ending." Malathi Rangarajan of The Hindu wrote "Stanley's treatment in `Mercury ... ' shows more maturity and class than his earlier films." Malini Mannath of Chennai Online said "The performance of the lead players and the realistic way the director has moved his script keeps one engaged for the most part" and called it "a fairly engaging entertainer". Lajjavathi of Kalki praised the performances of Srikanth and Meera Jasmine but felt Karthik Raja failed to shine and concluded in the midst of violence and vulgarity, college youths + families have been hit to attract both sides of the same stone.
