= April Maadhathil =

2002 film by S. S. Stanley

- DVD cover
- Directed by: S. S. Stanley
- Written by: S. S. Stanley
- Produced by: V. Gnanavelu; V. Jayaprakash
- Starring: Srikanth; Sneha
- Cinematography: M. V. Panneerselvam
- Edited by: Anil Malnad
- Music by: Yuvan Shankar Raja
- Production company: G. J. Cinema
- Release date: 29 November 2002
- Running time: 153 minutes
- Country: India
- Language: Tamil

April Maadhathil (transl. In the month of April) (Note: Spelt as April Maadhaathil on the CBFC certificate and title card.) is a 2002 Indian Tamil-language coming-of-age romantic drama film written and directed by newcomer S. S. Stanley. It stars Srikanth and Sneha, with Gayatri Jayaraman, Venkat Prabhu, Devan and Karunas among others in the supporting cast. The film, which had music scored by Yuvan Shankar Raja and cinematography handled by M. V. Panneerselvam, released on 29 November 2002. The film was remade in Kannada as Adarsha (2018).

== Plot ==
It's a story of friendship among eight girls and boys. Kathir is an intelligent guy who grew up in a poor family. His younger brother stopped his education for Kathir. In college, Kathir meets a girl named Shwetha and over time they become friends. Many guys are interested in her, but she finds something different about Kathir. The friends then decide to visit each others homes for their vacation. At Shwetha's home, they learn that Shwetha's father is thinking of getting her married the next year. At graduation, they cut their names on a tree since it is their final year. Though Kathir and Shwetha love each other, they are unable to express it. The rest of the story is about how they get together.

== Cast ==
- Srikanth as Kathir
- Sneha as Swetha
- Gayatri Jayaraman as Nirmala ("Nimmi")
- Venkat Prabhu as Venkat ("Venky")
- Devan as Shwetha's father
- Karunas as Cycle Jackson
- Kamala Krishnaswamy as Kathir's mother
- Daniel Balaji as Suresh
- Mayilsamy
- Bava Lakshmanan
- Anju Mahendran as Sams, Kathir's friend
- Ramakrishnan as Vedi, Kathir's friend
- Kottachi
- S. P. Balasubrahmanyam as himself
- Vandhana as Vandhana Swetha's friend
- Aishwarya as Swetha's friend

== Production ==
S. S. Stanley who had apprenticed with directors Mahendran and Sasi made his directorial debut with this film. It was Srikanth's second film after Roja Kootam. The film was mostly shot at the YMCA College of Physical Education in Chennai. Filming was also held at locations including Bangalore, Mysore, Ooty and Visakhapatnam.

== Soundtrack ==
The soundtrack, which released on 6 October 2002, was composed by Yuvan Shankar Raja, who himself had sung one of the songs. Opera singer Shekhina Shawn Jazeel sang one song under the name Prasanna. The song "Bailamo Bailamo" originally composed for this film was used in Bala.

Song	Singer(s)	Duration	Lyricist
"Yeh Nenje"	Harish Raghavendra, Sadhana Sargam	5:11	Thamarai
"Azhagaana Aangal"	Prasanna	4:27	Palani Bharathi
"Kanavugal Pookkum"	S. P. Balasubrahmanyam, Pop Shalini	4:32	Na. Muthukumar
"Manasae Manasae"	Karthik	4:58	Pa. Vijay
"Poi Solla Manasukku"	Yuvan Shankar Raja	5:05	Snehan
"Sight Adippom"	Silambarasan, Karthik	4:27	Pa. Vijay

== Critical reception ==
The Hindu wrote: "Stanley who heads [sic] direction, deserves special mention for a very decent handling of romance." Chennai Online called it "just another youth-based college campus caper, the scenes moving through college-time, vacations (to justify the title), and back to the college. The saving grace is the freshness of the teaming and the on-screen chemistry of the lead pair." Visual Dasan of Kalki wrote it is a college campus formula love story of friendship first then love but as if it has not been painted with an old color, the scenes are refreshingly new, often freeing us from the state of watching a film and making us feel like we are rewinding our college life. Cinesouth wrote, "The film states loud and clear that friendship between a boy and a girl ends in love without exception. And, the first time director Stanley has also proved that more than heroism, it is screenplay that matters the most for a film".

C. Shivakumar of Deccan Herald wrote "Director SS Stanley has done a good job with the script, but then one feels that the campus love theme is an oft-repeated one. In the first half, the director poignantly highlights the virtue of friendship between a boy and a girl in the campus, but in the second half, he dishes out the usual romantic fare. The script has a simple narrative, average songs and good performance by the lead characters.". Yahoo Movies wrote "Sneha and Srikanth have done their parts well, but the storyline lets them down. Music is no great shakes. However, the camerawork is good. An average campus love story!". Sify wrote, "The film is technically tacky with an utterly lamebrained story. Director S.S.Stanly has no clue of making a convincing love story. Srikanth is disappointing as Kathir and Sneha as Swetha has nothing much to do, but to look nice and say some banal dialogues. And for God’s sake does Gayathri Jayaram have to be a part of the cast? She has once again been displayed in a meaningless role with skimpy clothes. Karnas’ cheap comedy is unbearable. The music by Yuvan Shankar Raja is below average".
