= Rasool Ellore =

Indian cinematographer

- Born: 8 October 1964 (age 61); Rajahmundry, Andhra Pradesh, India
- Occupation: Cinematographer
- Spouse: Jahnavi Ellore

Rasool Ellore Reddy (born 8 October 1964), also known as Rasool, is an Indian cinematographer, screenwriter, and director known for his works in Telugu, and Hindi films. He is the brother-in-law and cousin of noted cinematographers, S. Gopal Reddy and Sameer Reddy, respectively. He is known for his works in films such as Gaayam, Gulabi, Chitram, and others. He made his debut as a director with the romantic comedy, Okariki Okaru. He has garnered three state Nandi Awards.

== Filmography ==
=== As cinematographer ===
Year	Title	Language	Notes
1992	Antham; Drohi	Telugu; Hindi	Shot the final scenes
1993	Gaayam	Telugu	
1993	Allari Alludu	Telugu	
1994	Money Money	Telugu	
1995	Gulabi	Telugu	
1995	Chinna Chinna Aasai	Tamil	TV series
1996	Little Soldiers	Telugu	
1996	Ramudochadu	Telugu	
1997	Daud: Fun on the Run	Hindi	
1998	Pyaar Kiya To Darna Kya	Hindi	
1999	Kohram	Hindi	
2000	Chitram	Telugu	
2001	Family Circus	Telugu	
2001	Nuvvu Nenu	Telugu	
2002	Air Panic	English	
2002	Crocodile 2: Death Swamp	English	
2002	Junoon	Hindi	
2008	Jalsa	Telugu	
2009	Kick	Telugu	
2011	Wanted	Telugu	
2011	Oosaravelli	Telugu	
2012	Neeku Naaku Dash Dash	Telugu	
2013	Veyyi Abaddalu	Telugu	
2014	Amrutham Chandamamalo	Telugu	
2015	Vinavayya Ramayya	Telugu	
2015	Shivam	Telugu	
2018	Ammammagarillu	Telugu	
2020	Amaram Akhilam Prema	Telugu	
2022	Khudiram Bose	Telugu	
2023	Agent	Telugu	
2024	Utsavam	Telugu	
2024	Devaki Nandana Vasudeva	Telugu	
2026	Sky	Telugu	
2026	Bad Boy Karthik	Telugu	

=== As director ===
Year	Title	Language	Notes
2003	Okariki Okaru	Telugu	
2005	Bhageeratha	Telugu	
2008	Sangamam	Telugu	

=== As assistant and steadicam operator ===
Year	Title	Role	Language	Notes
1986	Aakhree Raasta	Assistant Cameraman	Hindi	
1988	Khatron Ke Khiladi	Assistant Cameraman	Hindi	
1989	Siva	Steadicam Operator and Electrical Department	Telugu	
1992	Raatri/Raat	Steadicam Operator	Hindi; Telugu	

== Awards ==
Nandi Awards

- Nandi Award for Best Cinematographer – Gaayam (1993).
- Nandi Award for Best Cinematographer – Nuvvu Nenu (2001).
- Nandi Award for Best Debut Director – Okariki Okaru (2003).
