= Sasi (director) =

Indian Film Director

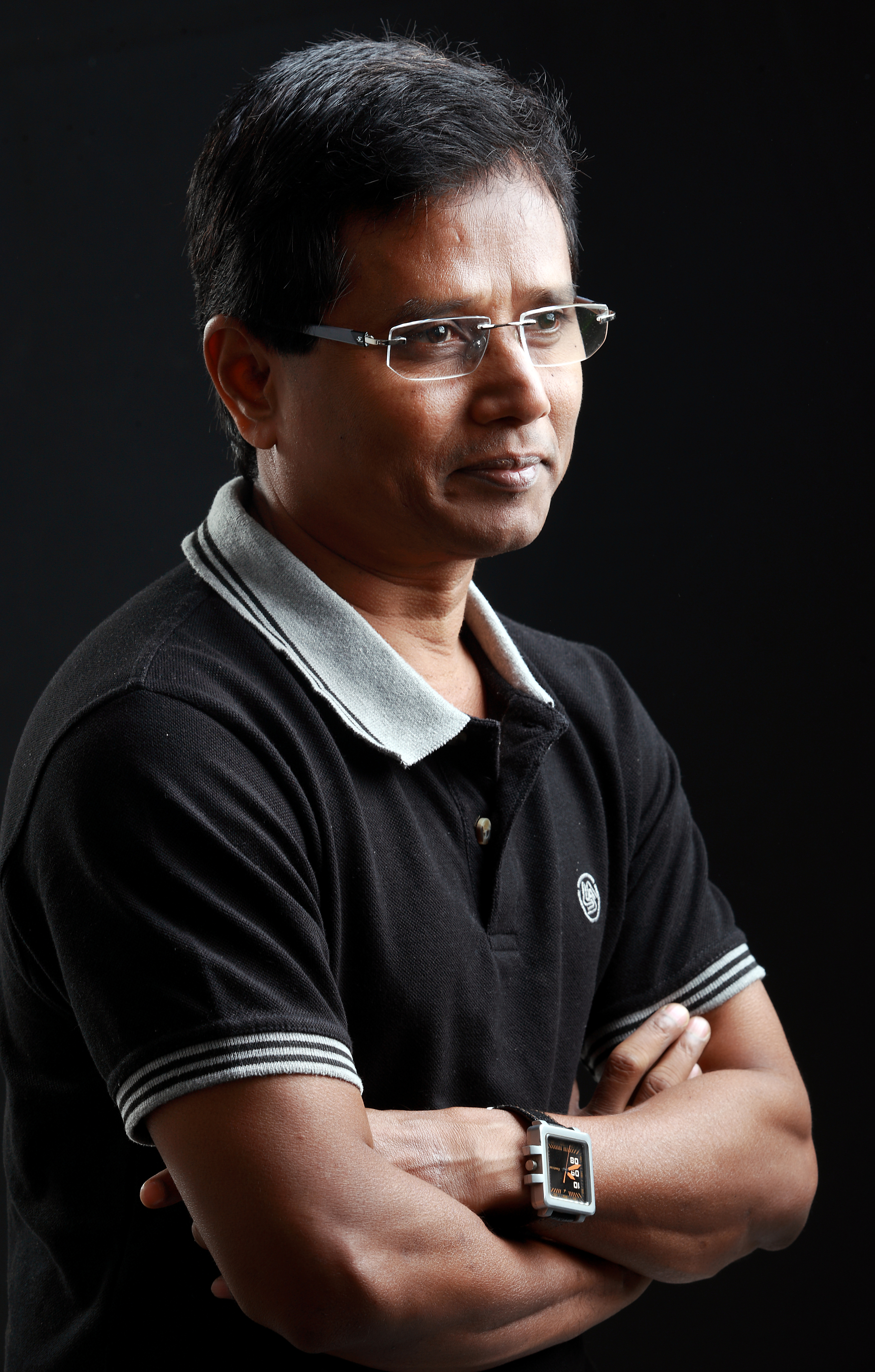
- Sasi in 2012
- Born: Sasidharan; 9 September 1970 (age 56); Mettur, Tamil Nadu, India
- Occupations: Film Director, Screenwriter,
- Years active: 1998–present
- Spouse: Geetha
- Children: 1

Sasidharan known as Sasi is an Indian film director and screenwriter working primarily in Tamil cinema. He made his directorial debut with Sollamale in 1998, followed by a series of successful romance films like Roja Kootam (2002), Dishyum (2006), and Poo (2008). His first action film was Ainthu Ainthu Ainthu (2013), followed by Pichaikkaran (2016) and Sivappu Manjal Pachai (2019)

== Career ==
=== Romance films and initial success (1998-2008) ===
Sasi made his directorial debut with Sollamale (1998) and directed its Telugu remake Seenu a year later. He later followed them up with a series of successful romance films, Roja Kootam (2002) and Dishyum (2006).

In January 2007, he decided to make Poo (2008), after being inspired by the romantic short story of Veyilodu Poi written by Thamizh Selvan, noting that the effect that the story had on him was "mind-blowing" and decided that he had "to take the story to everyone". He chose to utilise a new technical team for the project, choosing to sign up S. S. Kumar and P. G. Muthiah for the music and cinematography respectively, with the pair both passing a selection interview set up by Sasi. Srikanth was retained while Malayalam actress Parvathy was selected to play the female lead role in the film, and the director worked on toning down the actress' complexion. Upon release in December 2008, the film gained positive reviews with a critical noting "the one man who deserves an ovation here is director Sasi", "handling the story, screenplay, dialogue and direction, he has given a product that will please all true lovers of cinema and he must also be credited with extracting moving performances from the cast." A reviewer from Rediff.com wrote "as far as screenplays and performances go, Sasi has a winner on his hands. Few rural sagas are this refreshing or poetic." The film subsequently won accolades at several regional award ceremonies such as the 56th Filmfare Awards South, Vijay Awards and the Tamil Nadu State Film Awards, where it won recognition including a special mention in the Best Film category as another for portraying women in good light. The film was also screened across international film festivals, notably at the Los Angeles Indian Film Festival, and won Sasi the Best Director award in Ahmedabad International Film Festival.

=== Action films (2013-2019) ===
In late 2008, Sasi began work on his next film, his first action entertainer, and worked on the script, initially titled Puyal, for almost two years. He had casually narrated the story to Bharath, and the actor, impressed with the narration, approached the producers of the film to cast him in the lead role, and Sasi obliged. Since 2010, Bharath has expressed how important the film will be to his career and worked out to sport a six pack in the film. The film, titled Ainthu Ainthu Ainthu (555), which also features Chandini and Erica Fernandes, eventually released after several delays in August 2013 and won critical acclaim. A critic from Behindwoods.com noted "Sasi is a master teller when it comes to narrate a story about love and its finer aspects and there would always be a kind of poignancy in them. 555 is no exception", while another critic noted "The non-linear screenplay is a huge plus in making the film interesting".

In 2016, Sasi directed Pichaikkaran, which starred Vijay Antony in the lead role, who also composed the music. The film marks their second collaboration after Dishyum, in which Vijay Antony composed the music. The film received positive reviews and became a blockbuster at the box office. In 2019, Sasi directed Sivappu Manjal Pachai. The film features Siddharth as a stern traffic cop and G. V. Prakash Kumar as a brash and young illegal street bike racer.

=== Comeback (2026-present) ===
Sasi and actor-composer Vijay Antony reunited for Nooru Saami (2026), 10 years after Pichaikkaran, a film that ended up as a sleeper hit for the actor.

== Filmography ==
Year	Film	Notes
1998	Sollamale	
1999	Seenu	Telugu film; Remake of Sollamale (1998)
2002	Roja Kootam	
2006	Dishyum	
2008	Poo	Best Director (Ahmedabad International Film Festival); Nominated, Vijay Award for Best Director
2013	Ainthu Ainthu Ainthu	
2016	Pichaikkaran	
2019	Sivappu Manjal Pachai	
2026	Nooru Saami	
2026	Nooru Kodi Vaanavil	
