= Sakha Sakhi =

- Poster
- Directed by: Dayal Padmanabhan
- Screenplay by: Dayal Padmanabhan
- Based on: Thiruda Thirudi (2003) by Subramaniam Siva
- Produced by: Yathish Babu
- Starring: Sunil Raoh; Chaya Singh
- Cinematography: Chandru D
- Edited by: Vinod Manohar
- Music by: Sadhu Kokila
- Production company: Sri Annapoorneshwari Creations
- Release date: 14 December 2005
- Country: India
- Language: Kannada

Sakha Sakhi (transl. Male friend, female friend) is a 2005 Indian Kannada-language romantic comedy film directed by Dayal Padmanabhan. A remake of the Tamil film Thiruda Thirudi (2003), the film stars Sunil Raoh and Chaya Singh, who reprises her role from the original.

== Cast ==
- Sunil Raoh as Siva
- Chaya Singh as Viji
- Vasu
- Sadhu Kokila
- Doddanna
- Suja
- Sujibala
- Joe Simon
- Sanketh Kashi
- Sihi Kahi Chandru
- Vinayak Joshi

== Production ==
Rockline Venkatesh was briefly attached to this film as a producer. The film was made with little publicity.

== Soundtrack ==
The music was composed by Sadhu Kokila. The film notably didn't feature the "Manmadha Raasa" song from the original, which was already reused by Sadhu Kokila in Kalasipalya (2003). Nonetheless, the song "Mast Kudure" was partially inspired by that song. The song "Ammani Ammani" is based on "Kannamma Kannamma" from Tamil film Dum (2003). The songs "Chanda Kanthare" and "Ninna Nodidetige" were based on "Azhaga Irukkanga" and "Unnai Paartha Piragu" from Thiruda Thirudi.

Track listing
No.	Title	Singer(s)	Length
1.	"Ammanni Ammanni"	Rajesh Krishnan, Latha, Malathi	4:49
2.	"Bandaalapo Bandalo"	Karthik, Nanditha, Archana	4:57
3.	"Chana Kathare Hudgeeru"	Gurukiran, Chaitra H. G.	4:12
4.	"Mast Kudure"	Manikka Vinayagam, Sunitha	4:52
5.	"Ninna Noididtige"	Hemanth, Nanditha	2:46
Total length:			21:36

== Reception ==
R. G. Vijayasarathy of IANS wrote, "With the main attractive point missing out in the film,Sakha Sakhi falls flat down the ground with a bad handling of the project and poor taste of the director [...] and its below the belt dialogues" and added that "Sadhu Kokila's comedy is in poor taste. His music is also just ordinary". A critic from Rediff.com wrote that "Chaya Singh in the lead is Saka Saki's only redeeming feature. Sunil Rao tries to look natural as a street smart boy, but his body language and emoting fail to satisfy. An eminently forgettable film". S. N. Deepak of Deccan Herald wrote "A remake of a successful Tamil film Thiruda Thirudi, Sakha Sakhi is a romantic comedy about two friends. It comes across as another effort at engaging the teenaged audience for over 120 minutes with some measured ingredients. It is an amalgamation of love, sentiment and comedy". A critic from Sify wrote, "Director Dayal claims that he has made some small changes to the original (Thiruda Thirudi from Tamil) by adding some extra masalas to woo the youth. But sadly the film fails to impress".

== Box office ==
The film was a box office failure, which was attributed to the lack of publicity and the "Manmadha Raasa" song. Regarding the film's failure, Chaya Singh said she was not bothered about her image and how she is focusing on the quality of films and not the quantity.
