= Sunil Raoh =

Indian actor

Sunil Rao
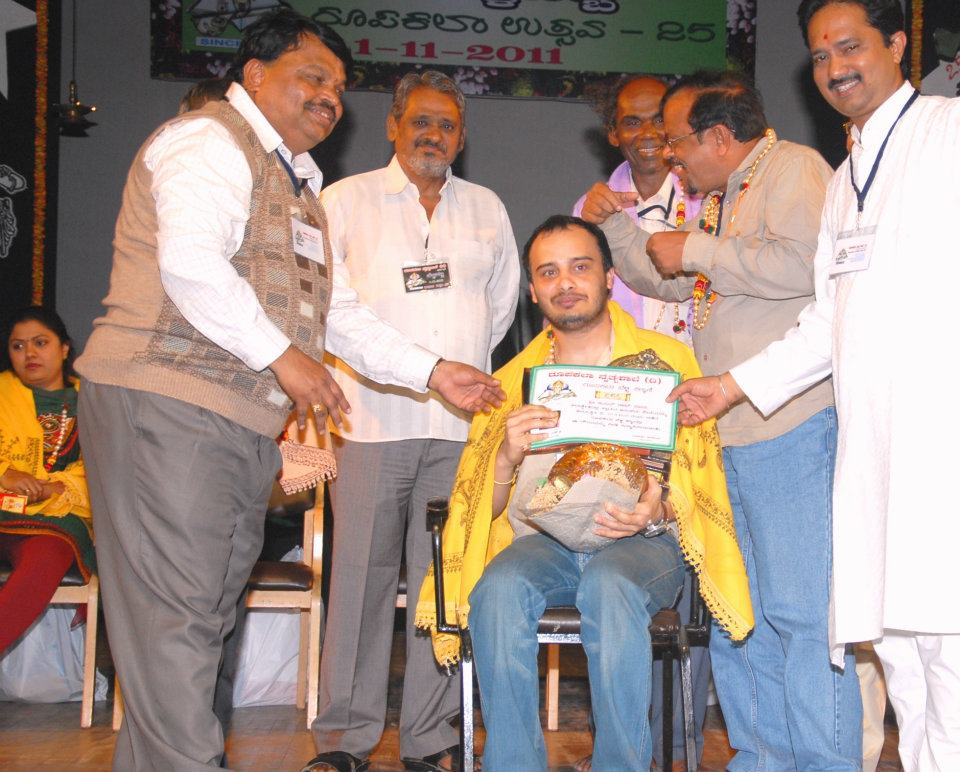
- Actor Sunil Raoh felicitated with Roopakala Award
- Born: Karnataka, India
- Other name: Sunil Rao
- Occupations: Actor, singer
- Years active: 1987–2010; 2017–present
- Spouse: Shreya Iyer
- Mother: B. K. Sumitra
- Family: Sowmya Raoh (sister)

Sunil Rao (born 4 September 1978) is a Kannada cinema actor from India. He is also a playback singer who has performed for few Kannada film songs. He has acted in numerous films as a child artist and also featured in a few television series.

== Personal life and family ==
Sunil Rao comes from a family of well-known musicians. His mother B. K. Sumitra, is a prominent Sugama Sangeetha (light music) singer. His sister Sowmya Rao is also an established playback singer who has performed for various films in different languages. He was also interested in playback-singing and entered the film industry aspiring to be one. But he had to change his path towards acting since offers came pouring ever since he was a child. He studied in Bangalore's National College.

== Career ==
=== As a child artist ===
Rao started his career as a child artiste in the year 1987 for the films such as Kendada Male and Elu Suttina Kote. He performed his roles much to the attention of producers and went on acting in a few more films.

=== Television artist ===
Rao, aspiring to be a playback singer, re-entered acting in his teens. He appeared in a few soap operas that included Janani, Chaduranga, Punarjanma, B. Suresha's Sadhane and T. N. Seetharam's Manvantara and Bhageerathi. In Janani, he was cast as the grandson of Bharathi Vishnuvardhan's character.

=== Films ===
Sunil Rao began his film career acting in some non-significant character roles in the films such as Chitra and Panchaalee. However, he shot to fame in the 2003 released English film Freaky Chakra. He starred alongside Deepti Naval as a young boy infatuated by an older woman. He also starred as a teenage lover in the Kavita Lankesh directorial Preethi Prema Pranaya opposite Anu Prabhakar, the same year. Then came his most successful Kannada film Excuse Me (2003) where he played an anti-hero character alongside Ajay Rao and Ramya.

In 2005, he starred in a series of unsuccessful films like Chappale, Masala and Sakha Sakhi. The latter was a remake of the Tamil hit Thiruda Thirudi. Most of his films during this time featured him alongside other male lead characters. Sakha Sakhi was an exception to this. In 2006, he starred in the critically acclaimed Belli Betta directed by Shivaraj Hoskere.

Following these ventures, Rao became choosy and featured in very few films in the late 2000s. Minugu opposite Pooja Gandhi was his solo release in the year 2010. Noted film maker Sunil Kumar Desai announced a film called Sarigama in 2008 with Rao and Prajwal Devaraj in the lead. This film, expected to have a 2012 release got shelved for unknown reasons.

Reports of him coming back to acting after a hiatus made news with his longtime associate director announcing his project called Bangalore Calling. It reported that Sunil would play one of the three main lead roles.

== Filmography ==
Key
†	Denotes films that have not yet been released

Year	Film	Role	Notes
1987	Kendada Male		As child artist
1988	Elu Suttina Kote	Ganesha	As child artist
1990	Swarna Samsara	Raju	As child artist
1991	Readymade Ganda		As child artist
1991	Shanti Kranti	Young Subhash	Uncredited role as child artist
1992	Prana Snehitha		As child artist
1992	Mysore Jaana	Anand	As child artist
1994	Gandugali		As child artist
1998	Shanti Shanti Shanti	Band member	Uncredited role
2001	Vande Matharam	Abhishek	
2001	Chitra	Ramu's friend	
2003	Panchaali		
2003	Freaky Chakra	Unannounced Guest	English film
2003	Excuse Me	Sunil	
2003	Preethi Prema Pranaya	Vivek	
2004	Baa Baaro Rasika	Vishwa	
2004	Chappale	Vijay	
2005	Masala	Vishwa	
2005	Sakha Sakhi	Siva	
2006	Belli Betta	Shiva	
2006	Jackpot	Himself	Guest appearance; also playback singer
2010	Minugu	Aditya	
2010	Premism	Prasanna	Guest appearance
2022	Old Monk	Krishna	Guest appearance
2022	Thurthu Nirgamana	Vikram	also playback singer
2024	Maryade Prashne	Satisha	
2026	Hayagrriva	Bhaskar	

=== Web series ===
Year of release	Film	Notes
2017	Loose Connection	First Kannada webseries

As playback singer

- "Suvvisuvvale – Bit" - Chukki Chandrama (1993)
- "Baa O Preethi Baa" - Jackpot (2006)
- "Bottom Of My Heart" - Tiger (2017)
- "Joru Joraagi" - Thurthu Nirgamma (2022)

== Awards ==
He has been awarded the 'Roopakala Belli Kanmani Award' as a 'Naada shreshta Kalavida' by the 'Roopakala Utsava-25' linked with the Karnataka State in the year 2011.
