= Malathy Lakshman =

- Born: 27 August 1973 (age 53)
- Origin: Chennai, Tamil Nadu, India
- Genres: Playback singer, singer
- Instrument: Vocals

Malathi Lakshman, also known as Malathy Lakshman, is an Indian playback singer predominantly active in the Tamil and Telugu film industries.

== Personal life ==
Malathy was born on 27 August 1973. Her mother tongue is Tamil.

Malathy is married to V. Lakshman. The couple have a daughter.

== Career ==
Malathy made her playback film debut in 1997 under the music direction of Deva for the Tamil film Saathisanam. The song, picturised on actress Vichithra, marked her first recording opportunity. In 2002, she was reintroduced by music director Vidyasagar, Her comeback song, "Sri Ranga Pattanam", from the Tamil film Karmegham, brought her recognition among music directors. She followed this with songs in films such as Parthiban Kanavu, Suyetchai MLA, and Anbe Sivam.

Malathy's major breakthrough came with the chart-topping hit "Manmadha Rasa" from the Tamil film Thiruda Thirudi (2003), composed by Dhina. The song's success made her a household name across Tamil Nadu, later the song was remade in Telugu and Kannada. Following the success of Manmadha Rasa, she became a popular choice for energetic folk and dance numbers. She went on to deliver hits such as "Umma Umma" (Adithadi), "Matha Matha Mathanu" (Varnajalam), "Saapida Vaadaa" (Kuthu), and "Kumbida Pona Deivam" (Thirupaachi), which captured Tamil audiences. In Telugu, she gave hits such as "Aa Ante Amalapuram" from Arya (2004), along with popular songs in Shankar Dada M.B.B.S., Anandamanandamaye, Donga Dongadi, and Siva Shankar.

== Notable filmography ==
Year	Song	Film	Language	Co-singers	Music director
2003	"Naattukkoru Seithi"	Anbe Sivam	Tamil	Kamal Haasan	Vidyasagar
2003	"Naa Pere Kanchanmala"	Shankar Dada M.B.B.S.	Telugu	Karthik	Devi Sri Prasad
2003	"Manmatha Rasa"	Thiruda Thirudi	Tamil	Shankar Mahadevan	Dhina
2003	"Vaadi Machhiniyae"	Parthiban Kanavu	Tamil	Sirkazhi G. Sivachidambaram	Vidyasagar
2004	"Kumbida Pona Deivam"	Thirupaachi	Tamil	Shankar Mahadevan	Dhina
2004	"Umma Umma"	Adithadi	Tamil	Manikka Vinayagam	Deva
2004	"Sappida Vada"	Kuthu	Tamil	Udit Narayan	Srikanth Deva
2004	Ore Oru Raathirikku	Chatrapathy	Tamil		S.A.Rajkumar
2004	"Aa Ante Amalapuram"	Arya	Telugu	Ranjith	Devi Sri Prasad
2004	"Manmadha Raja"	Donga Dongadi	Telugu	Shankar Mahadevan	Dhina
2004	"Silakemo"	Venky	Telugu	Sri Ram	Devi Sri Prasad
2005	"Unnale Thookam"	Adhu Oru Kana Kaalam	Tamil	Ranjith	Ilaiyaraaja
2005	"Gundu Manga"	Sachien	Tamil	Jassie Gift	Devi Sri Prasad
2005	Sayya Sayyare	Naa Alludu	Telugu	Karthik	Devi Sri Prasad
2005	"Vangathota"	Abhi	Telugu		Devi Sri Prasad
2005	"Jabilammavo"	Bunny	Telugu	Sagar (singer)	Devi Sri Prasad
2006	"Lelepaadi Lelepaadi"	Gandugali Kumara rama	Kannada	Mano	Gurukiran
2006	"Undivil"	Paramasivan	Tamil	Shankar Mahadevan	Vidyasagar
2006	"Paniyaram Suttu"	Thagapansamy	Tamil	Udit Narayan	Srikanth Deva
2006	"Yammaadi Aathaadi"	Vallavan	Tamil	T. Rajendar, Suchitra, Silambarasan	Yuvan Shankar Raja
2009	"Rangi Ranagamma"	Padikkadavan	Tamil	Udit Narayan	Mani Sharma
2009	"En Peru Meenakumari"	Kanthaswamy	Tamil	Krishna Iyer	Devi Sri Prasad
2010	"Vanga Kadal Ellai"	Sura	Tamil	Naveen	Mani Sharma
2011	"Azhagha Poranthuputa"	Siruthai	Tamil	Priyadharshini	Vidyasagar
2011	"Thoranthu vacha Puthagm"	Karuvarai Pookkal	Tamil	Dr.Vincent Theraisnathan, J.Kevin Jason	Thomas Rathnam
2011	"Kodiavanin Kadhaya"	Kanchana	Tamil	Sriram, M. L. R. Karthikeyan	S. Thaman
2011	"Villathi Villain"	Rajapattai	Tamil	Mano	Yuvan Shankar Raja
2013	"Karaikudi Aalamkudi"	Muthu Nagaram	Tamil		Jayprakas
2015	"Virugambakkam Vettu Kili"	Pathiladi	Tamil	Manicka Vinayagam, Dr.Vincent Theraisnathan, J.Kevin Jason	Thomas Rathnam
2022	"Kodi Kodi"	Regina	Tamil		Sathish Nair
2022	"Vela Vela" (dubbed)	Regina	Telugu		Sathish Nair

== Television ==
Year	Name of Television Show	Role	Network
2024	Super Singer Season 10	Guest	Star Vijay
