= Mullavalliyum Thenmavum =

- Directed by: V. K. Prakash
- Written by: Vindhyan
- Produced by: Vindhyan
- Starring: Kunchacko Boban; Indrajith Sukumaran; Chaya Singh; Lalu Alex
- Cinematography: S. Tirru
- Edited by: Anthony
- Music by: Ouseppachan
- Release date: 19 December 2003
- Country: India
- Language: Malayalam

Mullavalliyum Thenmavum (transl. Jasmine vines and honey-sweet Mango Tree) is a 2003 Indian Malayalam-language romance film directed by V. K. Prakash, starring Kunchacko Boban, Indrajith Sukumaran and Chaya Singh.

== Plot ==
Shelly and his girlfriend, Rajasree are in love, but Rajasree's mother is against their romance, since Shelly is a Christian and an orphan. They elope with the help of Shelly's uncle Dr. Alex. Rajasree, but decides that they will not have sexual relationship until her mother approves the marriage. She said she is giving her mother one year to change her mind. Initially her mother is against the marriage, but as the year ends, she relents.

On that day, Shelly falls from the sculpture which he was making and is paralysed. He asks Rajasree to leave him and have a good life, but she refuses. Dr. Alex brings an artist named Andre to finish Shelly's sculpture. Andre is soon joined by his girlfriend Eva. Rajasree does not like them because of their strange behaviour. One day Andre tries to rape Rajasree in front of the paralysed Shelly. Shelly cries in agony, and finally he stands up and fights Andre. Shelly then recovers fully. He learns that Dr. Alex suggested that Andre provoke him, hoping to trigger the change.

== Cast ==
- Kunchacko Boban as Shelly
- Indrajith Sukumaran as Andrew
- Chaya Singh as Rajasree / Minnu
- Kalyani as Thenmozhi
- Geetu Mohandas as Eva Cherian
- Lalu Alex as Dr. Alex
- Srividya as Kanakambal
- Ashokan as Chinnarangan
- Mala Aravindan as Gopalan Nair
- Mamukkoya as Postman
- Ramya Sudha

== Songs ==
The songs were written by Gireesh Puthenchery and were composed by Ouseppachan. The song "Chitti Kuruvi" was reused the Hindi song "Dil Mein Kuch Ho Raha Hai" by KK from the film Freaky Chakra.

| No. | Title | Singers | Length |
|---|---|---|---|
| 1. | "Anthinila Chemparunthu" | Indrajith Sukumaran |
| 2. | "Chitti Kuruvi" | Unni Menon, Sujatha Mohan |
| 3. | "Dhoom Thanakkadi" | Franko, Ganga, Baby Kalyani |
| 4. | "Kadalilaki Karayodu Cholli" | Franko, Balu |
| 5. | "Ninakkum Nilavil" | Kalyani Menon |
| 6. | "Ninave En Ninave" | P. Jayachandran |
| 7. | "Pachapalunke" | Balu, Jyotsna Radhakrishnan |
| 8. | "Thamara Noolinal" | G. Venugopal, Gayatri Asokan |
