= Chappale =

- Directed by: B. Naganna
- Screenplay by: B. Naganna
- Story by: Nanjunda
- Produced by: N. M. Suresh
- Starring: Sunil Raoh; Richa Pallod
- Cinematography: Sai Sathish
- Edited by: S. Manohar
- Music by: R. P. Patnaik
- Production company: Sri Thulaja Bhavani Creations
- Release date: 31 December 2004
- Country: India
- Language: Kannada

Chappale (transl. Claps) is a 2004 Indian Kannada-language romantic drama film directed by B. Naganna and starring Sunil Raoh and Richa Pallod in her Kannada debut.

== Cast ==
- Sunil Raoh as Vijay
- Richa Pallod as Janaki
- Ajay as Indra
- Sihi Kahi Chandru
- Doddanna
- V. Manohar
- Sathyajith as the police inspector
- Jai Jagadish
- R. G. Vijayasarathy
- Mandeep Roy
- Myna as Jayaraj
- Bank Janardhan

== Production ==
After the success of Excuse Me (2003), producer N. M. Suresh, Sunil Raoh and R. P. Patnaik collaborated again for this film. Newcomer Ajay debuted as the villain.

== Soundtrack ==
The music was composed by R. P. Patnaik. The lyrics were written by Kaviraj. The audio release function was held at Shree Ramana Maharishi Academy for the Blind in Bangalore with Puneeth Rajkumar, Gurukiran and K. Manju in attendance.

Track listing
No.	Title	Singer(s)	Length
1.	"Good Morning"	Sonu Nigam
2.	"Bachiko Nannali"	R. P. Patnaik, Shreya Ghoshal
3.	"Ilu Ilu"	Gurukiran, Nanditha
4.	"Sadane Torida Nimagella"	Sharadha Sugam
5.	"Chappale Thattu"	Shankar Mahadevan
6.	"Ninneya Nenapendigu"	R. P. Patnaik, Usha
7.	"Yen Ivaga"	Udit Narayan, Nagachandrika Bhat

== Release and reception ==
The film was released on 31 December 2004. A critic from Sify wrote that "Chappale produced by N. M. Suresh and directed by Naganna is a convincing musical love story". S. N. Deepak of Deccan Herald wrote "The film picks up the tempo when rowdy Indra enters the scene and the subsequent twists and turns in the post-interval part make the film watchable. The campus scenes, car chasing and action scenes are good. But a student’s imagination of underwear episode in the college seems too much. Sunil suits the playboy image. Richa Pallod’s smile is better than her acting. Debutante actor Ajay, as rowdy Indra, needs to further hone his skills. Camerawork by Sai Sathish is good". Music India Online wrote "The deft direction, catchy music, good acting by lead artistes and cinematography – senior director Naganna gives a well measured meaningful film. Producer N.M.Suresh after the mega hit of ‘Excuse Me’ once again come up with a notable film". The film was a box office failure.
