= R. M. Karumanikam =

Indian politician

Member of the Tamil Nadu Legislative Assembly
- In office 12 May 2021 – 11 May 2026
- Preceded by: K. C. Animuthu
- Succeeded by: Karunas
- Constituency: Tiruvadanai

Personal details
- Party: Indian National Congress
- Parent: K. R. Ramasamy

R. M. Karumanikam is an Indian politician who is a Member of Legislative Assembly of Tamil Nadu. He was elected from Tiruvadanai as an Indian National Congress candidate in 2021.

== Elections contested ==
Election	Constituency	Party	Result	Vote %	Runner-up	Runner-up Party	Runner-up vote %
2021 Tamil Nadu Legislative Assembly election	Tiruvadanai	INC	Won	39.33%	K. C. Animuthu	ADMK	32.46%
