= Tiruvadanai Assembly constituency =

One of the 234 State Legislative Assembly Constituencies in Tamil Nadu, in India

Coordinates: 9°46′57.65″N 78°54′49.19″E

Tiruvadanai
- Constituency No. 210 for the Tamil Nadu Legislative Assembly

Constituency details
- Country: India
- Region: South India
- State: Tamil Nadu
- District: Ramanathapuram
- Lok Sabha constituency: Ramanathapuram
- Established: 1951
- Total electors: 283,864

Member of Legislative Assembly
- 17th Tamil Nadu Legislative Assembly
- Incumbent Rajeev
- Party: TVK
- Elected year: 2026

Tiruvadanai is a state assembly constituency in Ramanathapuram district in Tamil Nadu. It is one of the 234 State Legislative Assembly Constituencies in Tamil Nadu, in India. It is a component of Ramanathapuram Lok Sabha constituency.

== Members of Legislative Assembly ==
Year	Member	Political party
Madras State
1952	Chella Durai	Independent
1957	Kariya Manickam Ambalam	Independent
1962	Kariya Manickam Ambalam	Swatantra Party
1967	Kariya Manickam Ambalam	Swatantra Party
Tamil Nadu
1971	P. R. Shanmugam	Dravida Munnetra Kazhagam
1977	Kariya Manickam Ambalam	Indian National Congress
1980	S. Anguchamy	All India Anna Dravida Munnetra Kazhagam
1984	K. Sornalingam	Indian National Congress
1989	K. R. Ramasamy	Indian National Congress
1991	K. R. Ramasamy	Indian National Congress
1996	K. R. Ramasamy	Tamil Maanila Congress (Moopanar)
2001	K. R. Ramasamy	Tamil Maanila Congress (Moopanar)
2006	K. R. Ramasamy	Indian National Congress
2011	Suba. Thangavelan	Dravida Munnetra Kazhagam
2016	Karunas	All India Anna Dravida Munnetra Kazhagam
2021	R. M. Karumanikam	Indian National Congress
2026	Rajeev	Tamilaga Vettri Kazhagam

== Election results ==
Vote share of winning candidates
2026	31.57%
2021	39.33%
2016	41.14%
2011	41.11%
2006	46.94%
2001	39.12%
1996	61.77%
1991	62.92%
1989	35.56%
1984	47.80%
1980	37.96%
1977	36.75%
1971	54.32%
1967	52.21%
1962	59.88%
1957	30.50%

=== 2026 ===
2026 Tamil Nadu Legislative Assembly election: Tiruvadanai
Party	Candidate	Votes	%	±%
TVK	Rajeev	69,551	31.57	New
INC	R. M. Karumanikam	67,038	30.43	▼8.9
AIADMK	M. Keerthika	63,879	29.00	▼3.46
NTK	N. Premnath	13,389	6.08	▼2.10
AIFB	S Suresh Kasini Venthan	1,482	0.67	
NOTA	NOTA	354	0.16	
Margin of victory		2,513	1.14	
Turnout		220,278	78.08	▲8.7
Registered electors		282,121		
TVK gain from INC		Swing	2513	

=== 2021 ===
2021 Tamil Nadu Legislative Assembly election: Tiruvadanai
Party	Candidate	Votes	%	±%
INC	R. M. Karumanikam	79,364	39.33%	New
AIADMK	K. C. Animuthu	65,512	32.46%	−8.68
AMMK	V. D. N. Anandh	33,426	16.56%	New
NTK	Jawahar	16,501	8.18%	+6.17
MNM	P. Sathyaraj	2,208	1.09%	New
Margin of victory		13,852	6.86%	2.20%
Turnout		201,815	69.37%	1.16%
Rejected ballots		502	0.25%	
Registered electors		290,943		
INC gain from AIADMK		Swing	-1.81%	

=== 2016 ===
2016 Tamil Nadu Legislative Assembly election: Tiruvadanai
Party	Candidate	Votes	%	±%
AIADMK	Karunas (Mukkulathor Pulippadai)	76,786	41.14%	New
DMK	S. P. Thivakaran	68,090	36.48%	−4.63
BJP	T. Dhevanathan Yadav	11,842	6.34%	+4.02
TMMK	B. John Pandian	9,597	5.14%	New
DMDK	V. Manimaran	4,913	2.63%	−37.89
SDPI	Mohamed Shariff Sate	4,728	2.53%	New
NTK	R. Rajiv Gandhi	3,739	2.00%	New
Margin of victory		8,696	4.66%	4.07%
Turnout		186,649	68.21%	−3.40%
Registered electors		273,644		
AIADMK gain from DMK		Swing	0.03%	

=== 2011 ===
2011 Tamil Nadu Legislative Assembly election: Tiruvadanai
Party	Candidate	Votes	%	±%
DMK	Suba Thangavelan	64,165	41.11%	New
DMDK	S. Mujupur Rahman	63,238	40.52%	+35.34
Independent	U. Pandivelu	6,667	4.27%	New
IDP (disambiguation)	Paulin Tharsis	3,919	2.51%	New
JMM	U. Karuppaiah	3,871	2.48%	New
BJP	Mahalingam Siva	3,632	2.33%	+0.57
Independent	R. Selvam	2,201	1.41%	New
Independent	S. S. Balakrishnan	1,448	0.93%	New
Independent	V. Kasbar	1,390	0.89%	New
Independent	V. Shahul Hameed	1,252	0.80%	New
BSP	M. Senthil Ramu	986	0.63%	−0.63
Margin of victory		927	0.59%	−3.87%
Turnout		156,072	71.61%	5.89%
Registered electors		217,955		
DMK gain from INC		Swing	-5.82%	

=== 2006 ===
2006 Tamil Nadu Legislative Assembly election: Tiruvadanai
Party	Candidate	Votes	%	±%
INC	K. R. Ramasamy	55,198	46.94%	New
AIADMK	C. Animuthu	49,945	42.47%	New
DMDK	P. Thiruvengadam	6,091	5.18%	New
BJP	S. Erulaiya	2,064	1.76%	New
BSP	K. Subramanian	1,485	1.26%	New
Independent	R. Liyakath Ali	1,444	1.23%	New
Independent	A. Rowthar Nainar Mohamed	739	0.63%	New
SP	S. Siva	639	0.54%	New
Margin of victory		5,253	4.47%	2.40%
Turnout		117,605	65.71%	5.85%
Registered electors		178,964		
INC gain from TMC(M)		Swing	7.82%	

=== 2001 ===
2001 Tamil Nadu Legislative Assembly election: Tiruvadanai
Party	Candidate	Votes	%	±%
TMC(M)	K. R. Ramasamy	43,536	39.12%	New
Independent	Jones Russo	41,232	37.05%	New
MADMK	S. Rajendran	22,392	20.12%	New
MDMK	H. Mohamed Musthafa	2,866	2.58%	−3.64
CPI(ML)L	D. Pandiyarajan	751	0.67%	New
Margin of victory		2,304	2.07%	−44.05%
Turnout		111,294	59.86%	−1.33%
Registered electors		186,083		
TMC(M) hold		Swing	-22.65%	

=== 1996 ===
1996 Tamil Nadu Legislative Assembly election: Tiruvadanai
Party	Candidate	Votes	%	±%
TMC(M)	K. R. Ramasamy	68,837	61.77%	New
INC	D. Sakthivel	17,437	15.65%	−47.27
Independent	V. Karunanithi	13,767	12.35%	New
MDMK	M. Mangaleswaran	6,926	6.22%	New
PMK	C. Ramadoss	2,697	2.42%	New
Independent	A. Simson	684	0.61%	New
Margin of victory		51,400	46.13%	16.89%
Turnout		111,436	61.20%	0.99%
Registered electors		189,680		
TMC(M) gain from INC		Swing	-1.14%	

=== 1991 ===
1991 Tamil Nadu Legislative Assembly election: Tiruvadanai
Party	Candidate	Votes	%	±%
INC	K. R. Ramasamy	65,723	62.92%	+27.36
JD	Sornalingam	35,187	33.68%	New
Independent	Karuppiah	1,976	1.89%	New
	Namachivayam	1,005	0.96%	New
Margin of victory		30,536	29.23%	27.51%
Turnout		104,461	60.20%	−6.57%
Registered electors		180,875		
INC hold		Swing	27.36%	

=== 1989 ===
1989 Tamil Nadu Legislative Assembly election: Tiruvadanai
Party	Candidate	Votes	%	±%
INC	K. R. Ramasamy	38,161	35.56%	−12.24
DMK	S. Murugappan	36,311	33.84%	New
Independent	K. Sornalignam	18,444	17.19%	New
AIADMK	M. Thennavan	13,475	12.56%	New
Margin of victory		1,850	1.72%	−17.17%
Turnout		107,314	66.78%	−5.68%
Registered electors		162,820		
INC hold		Swing	-12.24%	

=== 1984 ===
1984 Tamil Nadu Legislative Assembly election: Tiruvadanai
Party	Candidate	Votes	%	±%
INC	K. Sornalingam	47,618	47.80%	+12.03
Independent	M. Gnanaprakasam	28,801	28.91%	New
Independent	K. Maliappan	18,835	18.91%	New
Independent	M. K. Haja Najumuddn	3,574	3.59%	New
Independent	K. R. Alagu	787	0.79%	New
Margin of victory		18,817	18.89%	16.70%
Turnout		99,615	72.46%	5.58%
Registered electors		146,152		
INC gain from AIADMK		Swing	9.84%	

=== 1980 ===
1980 Tamil Nadu Legislative Assembly election: Tiruvadanai
Party	Candidate	Votes	%	±%
AIADMK	S. Anguchamy	34,392	37.96%	+5.45
INC	A. T. M. Ramanathan Thevara	32,406	35.77%	−0.98
Independent	N. Arumugam	16,578	18.30%	New
JP	S.W. Savarimuthi Udayair	7,225	7.97%	New
Margin of victory		1,986	2.19%	−2.05%
Turnout		90,601	66.88%	−0.71%
Registered electors		136,737		
AIADMK gain from INC		Swing	1.21%	

=== 1977 ===
1977 Tamil Nadu Legislative Assembly election: Tiruvadanai
Party	Candidate	Votes	%	±%
INC	Kr. Rm. Kariya Manickam Ambalam	32,386	36.75%	New
AIADMK	S. Anguchamy	28,650	32.51%	New
JP	S. W. Savarimuthi Udayair	16,126	18.30%	New
DMK	Kamalam Sellathurai	10,964	12.44%	−41.88
Margin of victory		3,736	4.24%	−5.12%
Turnout		88,126	67.60%	−6.51%
Registered electors		131,813		
INC gain from DMK		Swing	-17.57%	

=== 1971 ===
1971 Tamil Nadu Legislative Assembly election: Tiruvadanai
Party	Candidate	Votes	%	±%
DMK	P. R. Shanmugham	40,417	54.32%	New
SWA	Kr. Rm. Kariya Manickam Ambalam	33,457	44.97%	New
Independent	M. Somasundaram	527	0.71%	New
Margin of victory		6,960	9.35%	3.84%
Turnout		74,401	74.10%	−4.01%
Registered electors		105,818		
DMK gain from SWA		Swing	2.11%	

=== 1967 ===
1967 Madras Legislative Assembly election: Tiruvadanai
Party	Candidate	Votes	%	±%
SWA	K. Ambalam	37,556	52.21%	New
INC	M. Arunachalam	33,587	46.69%	+10.05
Independent	D. L. Nagasundaram	792	1.10%	New
Margin of victory		3,969	5.52%	−17.73%
Turnout		71,935	78.12%	6.51%
Registered electors		96,849		
SWA hold		Swing	-7.67%	

=== 1962 ===
1962 Madras Legislative Assembly election: Tiruvadanai
Party	Candidate	Votes	%	±%
SWA	Kr. Rm. Kariya Manickam Ambalam	37,612	59.88%	New
INC	S. Ramakrishna Thevar	23,011	36.64%	+16.09
Independent	Ramanuja Josiar	2,187	3.48%	New
Margin of victory		14,601	23.25%	13.30%
Turnout		62,810	71.61%	17.98%
Registered electors		90,297		
SWA gain from Independent		Swing	29.38%	

=== 1957 ===
1957 Madras Legislative Assembly election: Tiruvadanai
Party	Candidate	Votes	%	±%
Independent	Kr. Rm. Kariya Manickam Ambalam	13,633	30.50%	New
INC	S. Ramakrishnathevar	9,186	20.55%	New
Independent	Vellayan	8,237	18.43%	New
Independent	A. L. Pichaikutti Udayar	7,837	17.53%	New
Independent	Natarasathvar	5,807	12.99%	New
Margin of victory		4,447	9.95%	
Turnout		44,700	53.63%	
Registered electors		83,346		
Independent win (new seat)				
