= Dindigul Sarathy =

2008 film by Siva Sanmukam

- Poster
- Directed by: Siva Sanmukan
- Story by: Sreenivasan
- Starring: Karunas; Karthika; Saranya
- Cinematography: S. Thaj
- Music by: Dhina
- Production company: Dream Towers
- Distributed by: Sun Pictures
- Release date: 19 December 2008
- Country: India
- Language: Tamil

Dindigul Sarathy (transl. Dindigul Sarathy) is a 2008 Indian Tamil language comedy drama film directed by Siva Sanmukam, who earlier directed Thagapansamy. The film stars Karunas, Karthika, and Saranya Ponvannan, while Nassar, M. S. Bhaskar, Livingston, and Chitti Babu play supporting roles. The film has cinematography by S. Thaj and music by Dhina. The film was released on 19 December 2008. It is a remake of the Malayalam film Vadakkunokkiyantram (1989).

== Plot ==
The story revolves around an insecure teetotaler named Sarathy (Karunas) living with his mother and younger sister in Dindigul. Sarathy, who owns a small press company, has an inferiority complex due to his dark complexion. On his marriage proposal day, to everyone's surprise, bride Vasanthi (Karthika) who is fairer than Sarathy agrees to marry him. After their marriage, Sarathy begins to suspect Vasanthi for nothing on many occasions of her activities.

Adding to the list he beats his own brother, who came from Mumbai, thinking his better appearance may make Vasanthi love him. As a result, his mother Saradha estranged from them, leads the bond between him and Vasanthi more weaken. Still, the insecure Sarathy lies to her wife that he is going to town but goes to a nearby lodge to spy on his wife's activities. When he saw a man entering his house, he hit the man with a wooden log thinking him is the other man. But it's actually Vasanthi's father, who came to see her.

His suspicious mind works awfully as he imagines that his wife has an affair with the actor Ajithkumar. When cops proved him wrong, his insecure mind could not accept to believe. Then Sarathy went to Vasanthi's college senior who is an army officer now, disguised himself as a reporter. He created a ruckus thereby accusing the officer and his wife of a wrong relationship and stole his revolver. When Vasanthi got to know that his husband suspects her deportment he went to his parents' home. Frustrated Sarathy roams into the streets with an unstable mind gets bitten by dogs and is admitted to the hospital. He gets counselling from a Psychiatrist and understands the reality that 'A person's appearance does not matter. Only the talent is.' He then went to Vasanthi's village and apologized for his mistakes. But her parents were not ready to send their daughter with him and drove him off. When Sarathy boards a bus, Vasanthi unites with him and both of them return home and live happily ever after.

== Cast ==
- Karunas as Sarathy
- Karthika as Vasanthi
- Saranya as Saradha
- Nassar as Psychiatrist
- M. S. Bhaskar as Kaaka Karayaan
- Livingston as Police Inspector
- Chitti Babu as Police Constable
- Mayilsamy as Sarathy's uncle
- Shanmugarajan as Vasanthi's father
- Periyar Dasan as Sarathy's grandfather
- Manobala as Photographer
- Anu Mohan as House owner
- Lollu Sabha Balaji
- Vennira Aadai Moorthy
- Vellai Subbaiah
- Kovai Senthil
- Puja Bharati
- Flora Saini in song, a special performance

== Soundtrack ==
The soundtrack was composed by Dhina.

Track listing
No.	Title	Lyrics	Singers	Length
1.	"Dindukalu Dindukalu"	V. Elango	Anthony Daasan, Chinnaponnu, Grace Karunas	4:46
2.	"Dindukalu" (Remix)	V. Elango, Paul J	Anthony Daasan, Blaaze, Chinnaponnu, Grace Karunas	4:57
3.	"Ammadi Athadi"	Nandalala	Kailash Kher, Dhina	5:00
4.	"Paruthikaatu"	Siva Shanmugam	Shankar Mahadevan	5:42
5.	"Suttapazhama"	Siva Shanmugam	Mysskin, Sangeetha Rajeshwaran	4:27
Total length:				24:52

== Critical reception ==
The Hindu wrote "Borrowed from a Malayalam film, director Sivashanmugan makes a few small and suitable changes to the storyline for his Tamil venture". Chennai Online wrote, "The director has the courage to make the movie without cheap comedy and glamour. He has chosen right cast and succeeded in bringing out good performances from them", but the film "could have been far better had the director have worked out something new in the second [half]".
