= Donga Dongadi =

- DVD cover
- Directed by: Subramaniam Siva
- Written by: Chintapalli Ramana (dialogues)
- Screenplay by: Subramaniam Siva
- Story by: Subramaniam Siva
- Based on: Thiruda Thirudi (Tamil)
- Produced by: NV Prasad; Sanam Naga Ashok Kumar
- Starring: Manoj Manchu; Sadha; Sunil; Manikka Vinayagam; Rajiv Kanakala
- Cinematography: Ajayan Vincent
- Edited by: Marthand K. Venkatesh
- Music by: Dhina
- Production company: Sri Saideva Productions
- Release date: 6 August 2004
- Country: India
- Language: Telugu

Donga Dongadi is a 2004 Indian Telugu-language romantic comedy film written and directed by Subramaniam Siva and starring Manoj Manchu and Sadha while Sunil, Manikka Vinayagam, and Rajiv Kanakala play supporting roles. The film's soundtrack was composed by Dhina. This film marks the debut of Manoj Manchu as a leading actor. The film is remake of director's own 2003 Tamil-language film Thiruda Thirudi starring Dhanush and Chaya Singh. Donga Dongadi was released on 6 August 2004. It was considered as a hit at the box office.

== Plot ==
Vaasu (Manoj Manchu) is a strong-willed, reckless guy. He spends most of his time hanging out with his friends. He loves his father (Manikka Vinayagam) and brother (Rajiv Kanakala) very dearly. His brother is different from him that he is responsible and studious. Vaasu ignores his father's words of wisdom and is regularly chided by his father as a good-for-nothing guy. In one such incident, he loses the trust and faith of his father as he gets involved in teasing a girl called Vijji (Sadaf). That incident makes Vaasu realize the importance of having a good relationship with his father, but his father asks him to prove himself as a responsible man. Vaasu travels to Vizag from Tirupati in search of a job. In Vizag, he incidentally meets Vijji again. Meanwhile, another girl Pooja (Varshita) is madly in love with Vaasu. With Vaasu out to prove a point to his father, he finally convinces him and also wins Vijji's hand. By the end, he also realizes the importance of family values and his love for Vijji.

== Cast ==
- Manoj Manchu as Vasu (credited as Manoj Kumar)
- Sadha as Vijaya Lakshmi a.k.a. Viji
- Sunil as Chandragiri Chandru
- Manikka Vinayagam as Vasu's father
- Rajiv Kanakala as Ganesh, Vasu's brother
- Varshita as Pooja
- Vinaya Prasad as Vasu's mother
- Varsha
- Tejashree
- Telangana Shakuntala as Chandragiri Chandru's mother
- Dharmavarapu Subramanyam
- Kondavalasa Lakshmana Rao as Roadside shop owner
- AVS
- Siva Reddy as Vasu's friend
- Lakshmipati
- Gautam Raju
- Malladi Raghava as Narayana Swamy Naidu
- Ananth
- Sana
- Junior Relangi
- Gundu Hanumantha Rao
- Jenny
- Rajashree as Viji's mother

== Production ==
The rights of Tamil movie Thiruda Thirudi (2003) were brought by Sri Saideva Productions in 2003. Subramanyam Siva, director of the original Tamil version accepted the offer to direct the Telugu version too. Manchu Manoj Kumar was cast for the role Dhanush played in the Tamil movie and Sada for the role played by Chaya Singh. Being the debut movie of Manoj who was the son of famous Telugu actor Mohan Babu, the movie gathered lot of attention and publicity during the production. Chintapalli Ramana assisted Subramanyam Siva with the script and dialogues. Shooting of the movie began in May 2003 and the movie was released in August 2004. Subramanyam Siva also choreographed for this movie. Dhina, music director of the original movie was also taken to give the soundtrack for the Telugu version. The song "Manmadha Raja" was shot at KGF.

== Soundtrack ==
Donga Dongadi

Soundtrack album by Dhina
- Released: 4 July 2004
- Genre: Film soundtrack
- Label: Maruti Music
- Producer: Dhina

Dhina chronology
Jana (2005)	Donga Dongadi (2004)	Aayudham (2005)

The music of this movie was composed by Dhina. Audio release of the film was held on 4 July 2004. The audio was released and distributed by Maruti Music. The audio was well received and one song from the movie "Manmadha Raja" was an instant chart buster. Veturi, Bhuvanachandra, Kandikonda and Kulashekar penned lyrics for the songs in the film. The songs "Andam Guntaru", "Ninnu Choosenapudu" and "Manmadha Raja" were reused from the original.

No.	Title	Lyrics	Artist(s)	Length
1.	"Andam Guntaru"	Bhuvana Chandra	Tippu	4:11
2.	"Vana Vana"	Kulashekar	K. S. Chithra	4:46
3.	"Bhagyanagar Bumper"	Kandikonda	Udit Narayan, Radhika	4:20
4.	"Sotta Bugga"	Kandikonda	S. P. Balasubrahmanyam, Swarnalatha	4:14
5.	"Ninnu Choosenapudu"	Kulashekar	Karthik	2:48
6.	"Manmadha Raja"	Veturi	Shankar Mahadevan, Malathi	4:49

== Release and reception ==
The movie was released in India and overseas on 6 August 2004. The movie was received with positive reviews and critics praising Manoj for his portrayal of the character in the movie. Jeevi of Idlebrain gave 3.35 of 5 rating for the movie and commented that Manoj has lived up to the expectations and that he had shown a lot of promise. Telugu Cinema wrote "[Screenplay] is pretty good. First half is slow, second half is good. [..] Everything about the film is on a high note, the adrenalin-flowing kind, the director not making any pretense of making a classy product, but getting straight down to the brass tacks. What holds the film together is the scripting and narrative style, which though a bit crude and lacking in finesse is fast paced, and racy, at times weird and unusual, the likes of which one hasn't seen in earlier films. The director is focused on what he wants and there are no lagging moments." The movie fared well at the box office.
