= Minugu =

- Directed by: Anthony Jayavanth
- Written by: Anthony Jayavanth
- Produced by: G. Gajendra
- Starring: Pooja Gandhi; Sunil Raoh; Ajith Hande
- Cinematography: S. Sathish Kumar
- Edited by: H. S. Srikanth
- Music by: Rajesh Ramanath
- Production company: Arpitha Chitra
- Release date: 1 January 2010
- Running time: 129 minutes
- Country: India
- Language: Kannada

Minugu (Kannada: ಮಿನುಗು) is a 2010 Indian Kannada language romantic-drama film directed by the ad-film maker Anthony Jayavanth debuting in feature films. The film stars Pooja Gandhi, Sunil Raoh making a comeback after four years and Ajith Hande, a theatre actor making his film debut, in prominent roles. The film is produced by G. Gajendra who also makes a cameo performance on screen as a producer.

The film released on the very first day of the year 2010 across Karnataka screens. However, due to the "weak script" as quoted by the critics, the film failed to win over the box-office.

== Plot ==
Aditya and Sanchita study in the same college and become friends. While Aditya develops love towards Sanchita, she remains focused on her dreams of becoming a cinema star. After the studies, she eventually becomes a star and finds an overnight success. Aditya, on the other hand, remains jobless and becomes dependent on his only sister's earnings. His love towards Sanchita grows more after she reaches stardom and all this will be under the observation of her co-star Siddharth who is jealous of her success. He hatches a plot to demean her using Aditya as a pawn. He befriends Aditya and asks him to do activities that irks her and make her hate him and even send him to jail. The rest of the story examines how Sanchita realises Siddharth's tricks and how she reunites with Aditya.

== Cast ==
- Pooja Gandhi as Sanchita
- Sunil Raoh as Aditya
- Ajith Hande as Siddharth
- Akshata Raghunath
- Chi. Guru Dutt
- Sangeetha Shetty
- Master Sachin
- G. Gajendra
- P. D. Sathish Chandra

== Production ==
Most of the filming took over at the picturesque locations of Sakleshpur in Karnataka. Some parts were shot at Bangalore.

== Soundtrack ==
All the songs are composed and scored by Gopu. The audio launch function was a simple affair with the lead characters attendance at a hotel on 13 July 2009. Aditya Music acquired the rights of the audio CD which consisted of 5 Songs. The audio was released by the mother of producer Gajendra. Newcomer Shiva Shashi alias Jagadish wrote the lyrics for the songs.

Sl No	Song title	Singer(s)	Lyrics
1	"Minugu"	Gopu	Shiva Shashi
2	"Neene Neene"	Vyas Raj, Apoorva Sridhar, Pooja Gandhi	Shiva Shashi
3	"Hey Sanchita"	Gopu, Apoorva Sridhar	Shiva Shashi
4	"Olave"	Vyas Raj	Shiva Shashi
5	"Mannisu"	Vyas Raj	Shiva Shashi
6	"Neene Neene"	Chetan Sosca, Apoorva Sridhar	Shiva Shashi

== Reception ==
=== Critical response ===
A critic from The Times of India scored the film at 3 out of 5 stars and says "Full marks to Pooja Gandhi for her brilliant performance and excellent expressions. Sunil too is impressive. Ajit Hande is okay. Music by Gopu is average. Sathish Kumar's camerawork is marvellous". B S Srivani from Deccan Herald wrote "Sunil Raoh is perfectly cast and doesn’t show the rust of a two-year lay-off. It is Ajit who has a ball, with his eyes and the sneer doing the job for him. Close to climax, the film seems rushed but evens out beautifully towards the end. The chinks are almost negligible" A critic from The New Indian Express wrote "However, director Jayavanth has not succeeded in making this film really praiseworthy. The main drawback of ‘Minugu’ is the weak and incongruous script. Some sequences, especially where a police inspector arrests the hero, have no justification. Pooja Gandhi has acted well but in vain. Sunil Raoh has tried hard to do justice to his role". A critic from Bangalore Mirror wrote "The abduction turns out to be a false story as Sanchita comes back from a visit abroad. Sanchita is angry with Adi for the mess, but the truth turns out to be different. The film is fast paced and with some decent performances, it makes for a good watch".
