= KR. RM. Kariya Manickam Ambalam =

Indian politician

KR. Ramasamy Kariya Manickam Ambalam was an Indian politician, social worker, and former Member of the Legislative Assembly.

== Personal life ==
Ambalam was the only son of Ramasamy Ambalam. He was born in the small village of Kappallur, Devakottai taluk, Sivagangai district, Tamil Nadu, where his family were wealthy landlords. He had one son, K. R. Ramasamy, who followed him into politics, and three daughters.

== Politics ==
Ambalam acted as a popular leader for over 100 villages and a few towns. He was a close friend to Pasumpon Muthuramalingam Thevar.

He was elected four times: to the Tamil Nadu legislative assembly in 1957 as an independent candidate, in the 1962 and 1967 elections as a Swatantra Party candidate, and in the 1977 election as an Indian National Congress candidate for Tiruvadanai.

After he died, village people under Karur Nadu and Kappallor Nadu erected two bronze statues in Karur and Kannankudi.
