= Vellai Yaanai =

2021 Indian film

- Official release poster
- Directed by: Subramaniam Siva
- Starring: Samuthirakani; Yogi Babu; Athmeeya
- Music by: Santhosh Narayanan
- Country of origin: India
- Original language: Tamil

Production
- Producer: S. Vinodh Kumar
- Cinematography: Vishnu
- Editor: A. L. Ramesh
- Production company: Mini Studios

Original release
- Network: Sun TV
- Release: 11 July 2021

Vellai Yaanai (transl. White elephant) is a 2021 Indian Tamil-language drama film directed by Subramaniam Siva and starring Samuthirakani, Yogi Babu and Athmeeya in the lead roles. Produced by Mini Studios, it was released on 11 July 2021 on Sun TV.

== Plot ==
An agrarian community with a thriving barter system becomes prey to a profit-driven bank. The once-prosperous village soon declines as the bank systematically destroys the village’s economy.

== Cast ==
- Samuthirakani as Vellai Kunju
- Yogi Babu as Kozhukattai aka KK
- Athmeeya as Vendaam Amirtham
- S. S. Stanley as Bank Officer
- E. Ramdoss as Insecticide seller
- A. Govindamoorthy as Villager
- MGR Ravichandran as District Collector
- Bava Chelladurai as Major
- Uday Mahesh as Almsgiver
- Saranya Ravichandran as Valli
- Benjamin as Villager
- Poraali Dileepan as Bank Officer

== Production ==
Subramaniam Siva made a return as a director after a long sabbatical, and selected Samuthirakani to portray the lead role of a farmer. Athmiya Rajan was cast as the lead actress after the director was impressed by her performance in the Malayalam film, Joseph (2018) Post-production for the film began in June 2019, but the film's release was delayed by two years.

== Soundtrack ==
Soundtrack was composed by Santhosh Narayanan.

- Vennila – Vijaynarain, Sangeetha Karuppiah
- Aara Thedum – Santhosh Narayanan
- Vaazha Vechonae – Vijaynarain
- Thandhom Thana – Mukesh Mohamed
- Nellu Vaasam – Santhosh Narayanan

== Release ==
The film was directly released on Sun TV on 11 July 2021. A critic from Cinema Express wrote "inconsistency mars this well-intentioned Samuthirakani tearjerker", adding "inconsistent writing ruins the well-performed rural drama." Entertainment portal Dinamalar gave the film mixed reviews.
