= Pori (film) =

- Poster
- Directed by: Subramaniam Siva
- Written by: Subramaniam Siva
- Produced by: Sambandam Karthi
- Starring: Jiiva; Pooja
- Cinematography: N. K. Ekambaram
- Edited by: Antony
- Music by: Dhina
- Production company: Nivi-Pavi Creations
- Release date: 9 February 2007
- Running time: 150 minutes
- Country: India
- Language: Tamil

Pori (transl. Sparks) is a 2007 Indian Tamil-language action comedy film directed by Subramaniam Siva. The film stars Jiiva and Pooja.

Pori was released on 9 February 2007. The film met with negative reviews and turned out to be a box office bomb.

== Plot ==
Hari is an unemployed youth who runs a pavement book shop in Tripiclane area. His father, an upright retired schoolteacher, buys him a shop in a building with his PF money. He names it "Periyar Bookshop" and runs it with his two friends. Meanwhile, he constantly bumps into a TV reporter Pooja, and a love-hate relationship happens. One day, a Malaysian-based businessman named Mahadevan comes and evicts Hari from the shop, claiming that it belongs to him. Hari now discovers that his father was cheated by a land mafia gang which specializes in forged documents and is hand-in-glove with revenue officials. He decides to take the gauntlet and unveil the evil forces behind the property grabbers. Soon, he discovers that Nama Shivayam, Vinayagam real estates owner, is the brains behind the entire operation. How Hari becomes a one-man army and brings Nama Shivayam to justice forms the rest of the story.

== Cast ==
- Jiiva as Hari
- Pooja as Pooja
- Seeman as Mahadevan
- Sampath Raj as Nama Shivayam
- Nagesh as Hari's father
- Karunas as Hari's friend
- Ganeshkar as Hari's friend
- Delhi Ganesh as Pooja's father
- Shanmugarajan as Police Inspector
- Kadhal Dhandapani
- T. P. Gajendran
- Mahanadi Shankar
- Gana Ulaganathan
- Scissor Manohar
- Bava Lakshmanan
- Jaya Murali
- Jagan as himself
- Kanal Kannan as Special appearance
- Daisy Shah as Item dancer (Special appearance)

== Production ==
The film was initially announced in December 2005 with Jiiva and Nila starring, before the latter was replaced by Pooja. A set resembling a street consisting of book shops and homes where most of the action takes place was built at AVM Studios for ₹25 lakh (equivalent to ₹75 lakh or US$89,000 in 2023) and was shot there for three weeks while the film was also shot around locations such as Besant Nagar, Ashok Nagar and K. K. Nagar. The song "Vedhala Murunga Maram" was shot at Golconda Fort.

== Soundtrack ==
Soundtrack was composed by Dhina, with lyrics by Yugabharathi. The audio was launched at Sathyam Cinemas on 3 January 2007.

Track listing
No.	Title	Singer(s)	Length
1.	"Eppadiyellam"	Shankar Mahadevan
2.	"Jigina Nadanthu"	Grace Karunas, Jassie Gift
3.	"Perunthil Nee"	Madhu Balakrishnan, Madhushree, Dhina
4.	"Pookkalellam"	Hariharan
5.	"Vedhala Dhevathaiye"	Shankar Mahadevan, Malathi
6.	"Yetta Uyarathil"	Jeeva, Dhina, Subramaniam Siva

== Reception ==
Sify wrote, "There is no script or narrative as the director deploys all cinematic cliches since time immemorial. Six songs at regular intervals that are badly picturised tests your patience. Jeeva has done a larger-than-life role which just does not suit him". Shwetha Bhaskar of Rediff.com wrote, "Watch Pori if you want to aimlessly fritter time away". Malini Mannath of Chennai Online wrote, "This is the director's second film after the highly successful 'Thiruda Thirudi'. The debut film, though lacking in finesse, had managed to hold audience interest with its humour, colourful characters and peppy song-dance numbers. But 'Pori' fails to excite with its lacklustre script and predictable situations".

Lajjavathi of Kalki wrote the story starts only after the break, so it becomes very tiring. She added that the director confuses himself and us by putting many characters. Malathi Rangarajan of The Hindu wrote, "`Pori's theme that comes to the fore rather late, is new ... and that's about it". Karunas bought the film's distribution rights for the areas North Arcot and South Arcot, however the film failed at the box-office and Karunas suffered losses in distribution.
