= Manikka Vinayagam =

Indian singer and actor (1943–2021)

- Born: Vazhuvoor Manikka Vinayagam Ramaiya Pillai; 10 December 1943; Mayiladuthurai, Tamil Nadu, British India
- Died: 26 December 2021 (aged 78) Chennai, Tamil Nadu, India
- Genres: Playback singing, Folk music
- Occupations: Singer
- Instruments: Vocals, Harmonium
- Years active: 2001–2021
- Label: Audiotracs

Manikka Vinayagam (10 December 1943 – 26 December 2021) was an Indian playback singer and actor. He sang for predominantly Tamilfilms and acted in several films as a character artist. He was the son of the dancer Vazhuvoor B. Ramiah Pillai. His uncle and music guru was the singer C. S. Jayaraman.

== Biography ==
Vinayagam was born on 10 December 1943 in Mayiladuthurai in the then Madras Presidency. His father Vazhuvoor B. Ramiah Pillai was a Bharatanatyam dancer while his uncle C. S. Jayaraman was a singer, music director, and actor in the Tamil film industry. He was introduced to Carnatic and Hindustani music by his uncle. He picked up the Nadaswaram, a wind instrument, in his youth.

Vinayagam debuted as a playback singer in the Tamil film Dhill, with the song "Kannukkulla Gelathi" composed by Vidyasagar. His debut in acting was for Thiruda Thirudi playing the father character to Dhanush. Since then, he has sung close to 800 songs in various languages. Apart from these, he has sung close to 15000 devotional folk, love and Carnatic music songs. Vinayagam also had an orchestra Starlings, which consisted of musicians and singers who were children of other actors.

Vinayagam died from a cardiac arrest at his home in Chennai, on 26 December 2021, at the age of 78.

== Selected discography ==
=== Films ===
Year	Song	Film	Music director	Co-singer(s)	Notes
2001	"Kannukkulle"	Dhill	Vidyasagar		
2001	"Yelai Imayamalai"	Thavasi	Vidyasagar		
2002	"Vidai Kodu"	Kannathil Muthamittal	A. R. Rahman	M. S. Viswanathan, Balram	
2002	"Dhaya Nee"	Dhaya	Bharadwaj	Bharadwaj	
2002	"Pombalainga Kadhal"	Unnai Ninaithu	Sirpy	P. Unnikrishnan	
2002	"Theradi Veethiyil"	Run	Vidyasagar	Karthik	
2002	"Thala Keezha"	Gemini	Bharadwaj		
2002	"Subbamma Subbamma"	Roja Koottam	Bharadwaj	Malgudi Subha	
2003	"Vandi Vandi"	Jayam	R. P. Patnaik	Tippu	
2003	"Kadhal Vandhal"	Iyarkai	Vidyasagar	Tippu	
2003	"Ayurveda Azhagi"	Thiruda Thirudi	Dhina	Srilekha Parthasarathy	
2003	"Koduva Meesai"	Dhool	Vidyasagar	Vidhu Prabhakar	
2003	"Chinnaveeda"	Ottran	Praveen Mani	Srilekha Parthasarathy	
2003	"Theeratha Dum"	Parthiban Kanavu	Vidyasagar	Tippu	
2004	"Markandeya"	New	A. R. Rahman	Nithyashree	
2004	"Punnakunnu"	Arul	Harris Jayaraj	Tippu	
2004	"Arjunar Villu"	Ghilli	Vidyasagar	Sukhwinder Singh	
2004	"Pattu Pattu"	Shankar Dada M.B.B.S.	Devi Sri Prasad	Sumangali	Telugu song
2005	"Kokku Para Para"	Chandramukhi	Vidyasagar	Tippu	
2005	"Kattu Kattu"	Thirupaachi	Devi Sri Prasad	Sumangali	Remake of "Pattu Pattu"
2005	"Thaai Sollum"	Kana Kandaen	Vidyasagar		
2005	"Hey Pangali"	Majaa	Vidyasagar	Udit Narayan, Tippu	
2005	"Mast Kudure"	Sakha Sakhi	Sadhu Kokila	Sunitha	
2006	"Mannargudi Kalakalakka"	Sivappathigaram	Vidyasagar	Rajalakshmi, Chinnaponnu	
2006	"Allave Yengalin Thaai Bhoomi"	Aran	Joshua Sridhar	Sajid Farth	
2006	"Ennamma Devi"	Thambi	Vidyasagar	Karthik, Balesh	
2006	"Chethavadam"	Veyil	G. V. Prakash Kumar		
2006	"Aiyyyayyyo"	Paruthiveeran	Yuvan Shankar Raja	Krishnaraj, Shreya Ghoshal, Yuvan Shankar Raja	
2007	"Vaa Mahaney Vaa"	Onbadhu Roobai Nottu	Bharadwaj		
2007	"Jigu Jickan"	Oram Po	G. V. Prakash Kumar		
2008	"Veeramulla"	Kaalai	G. V. Prakash Kumar		
2008	"America Endralum"	Santhosh Subramaniam	Devi Sri Prasad	Naveen, Premgi Amaren, Pushpavanam Kuppusamy, Priya Himesh	
2008	"Kamannanavare"	Kaamannana Makkalu	Vidyasagar	Tippu	Kannada song; remake of "Hey Pangali"
2008	"Namma Ooru Nallarukku"	Seval	G. V. Prakash Kumar	Tippu, Anuradha Sriram, Mahathi, Shreya Ghoshal, Prashanthini	
2009	"24 Caret Bangara"	Rajkumari	V. Harikrishna	Shamitha Malnad	Kannada songs
2009	"Jaajiya Malledindu"	Chellidaru Sampegiya	S. Narayan	Chethan Sosca, Shamitha Malnad	Kannada songs
2010	"Theakku Maramaattam"	Magizhchi	Vidyasagar		
2010	"Naane Inthiran"	Singam	Devi Sri Prasad		
2010	"Antharathil Aadum"	Thoppul Kodi			Film unreleased
2011	"Aaduvome Pallu Paaduvome"	Sadhurangam	Vidyasagar		
2012	"Ashada Kaledaithe"	Parie	Veer Samarth	B. K. Sumitra, Mysore Janni, Samanvitha	Kannada song
2012	"Thara Thiruguva Bhoomi"	Gandhi Smiles	Veer Samarth	Mysore Janni	Kannada song; credited as Manikyam
2014	"Vettaiyadu Koottam"	Sandiyar	Yadhish Mahadev		
2014	"Ayya Chandruda"	Jaihind 2	Arjun Janya		Telugu song
2015	"Virugambakkam Vettu Kili"	Pathiladi	Thomas Rathnam		

=== Television ===
Year	Film	Song	Music director	Co-singer(s)	Channel
2005	Vikramadithyan	"Vikramadithya"	Rajesh Vaidhya		Sun TV
2009	Aadhi Parasakthi	"Aadhi Parasakthi"	Rajesh Vaidhya	Rajesh Vaidhya	Raj TV

== Acting filmography ==
- Dhill (2001)
- Thiruda Thirudi (2003)
- Gambeeram (2004)
- Perazhagan (2004)
- Donga Dongadi (2004; Telugu)
- Giri (2004)
- Arivumani (2004)
- Bose (2004)
- Kalvanin Kadhali (2006)
- Thimiru (2006)
- Thullal (2007)
- Puli Varudhu (2007)
- Santosh Subramaniam (2008)
- Mathiya Chennai (2009)
- Thozhi (2009)
- Vettaikkaran (2009)
- Bale Pandiya (2010)
- Va Quarter Cutting (2010)
- Yuddham Sei (2011)
- Aadu Puli (2011)
- Singam Puli (2011)
- Avargalum Ivargalum (2011)
- Enbathettu (2017)
