= Karaikudi Assembly constituency =

State assembly constituency in Tamil Nadu, India

Coordinates: 10.07°N 78.78°E

Karaikudi
- Constituency No. 184 for the Tamil Nadu Legislative Assembly

Constituency details
- Country: India
- Region: South India
- State: Tamil Nadu
- District: Sivaganga
- Lok Sabha constituency: Sivaganga
- Established: 1951
- Total electors: 3,06,124
- Reservation: None

Member of Legislative Assembly
- 17th Tamil Nadu Legislative Assembly
- Incumbent T. K. Prabhu
- Party: TVK
- Elected year: 2026

Karaikudi is a state assembly constituency in Sivaganga district in Tamil Nadu. Most successful party: INC (five times). It is one of the 234 State Legislative Assembly Constituencies in Tamil Nadu in India.

== History ==
Karaikudi is a part of Karaikudi Assembly constituency and it elects a member to the Tamil Nadu Legislative Assembly once every five years. From the 1977 elections, All India Anna Dravid Munnetra Kazhagam (AIADMK) won the assembly seat four times (in the 1977, 1984, 1991 and 2009 elections), two times by Dravida Munnetra Kazhagam (DMK, 1980 and 1989), once by Tamil Maanila Congress (TMC, 1996) and three by the Indian National Congress (INC) won during the 2006, 2016 and 2019 elections. The current member of the legislative assembly is S. Mangudi from the INC.

Karaikudi is a part of Sivaganga Lok Sabha constituency. The current Member of Parliament from the constituency is Karti Chidambaram from the INC.

== Members of Legislative Assembly ==
Year	Member	Political party
Madras State
1952	Chockalingam Chettiar	Indian National Congress
1957	M. A. Muthiah Chettiar	Indian National Congress
1962	Saw Ganesan	Swatantra Party
1967	S. Meiyappan	Swatantra Party
Tamil Nadu
1971	C. T. Chidambaram	Dravida Munnetra Kazhagam
1977	P. Kaliyappan	All India Anna Dravida Munnetra Kazhagam
1980	C. T. Chidambaram	Dravida Munnetra Kazhagam
1984	S. P. Durairasu	All India Anna Dravida Munnetra Kazhagam
1989	R. M. Narayanan	Dravida Munnetra Kazhagam
1991	M. Karpagam	All India Anna Dravida Munnetra Kazhagam
1996	N. Sundaram	Tamil Maanila Congress
2001	H. Raja	Bharatiya Janata Party
2006	N. Sundaram	Indian National Congress
2011	C. T. Palanichamy	All India Anna Dravida Munnetra Kazhagam
2016	K. R. Ramasamy	Indian National Congress
2021	S. Mangudi	Indian National Congress
2026	T. K. Prabhu	Tamilaga Vettri Kazhagam

== Election results ==
Vote share of winning candidates
2026	43.77%
2021	35.75%
2016	46.40%
2011	51.01%
2006	48.70%
2001	48.40%
1996	62.98%
1991	65.68%
1989	41.24%
1984	48.98%
1980	51.78%
1977	32.03%
1971	59.82%
1967	58.73%
1962	49.31%
1957	48.34%
1952	58.81%

=== 2026 ===
2026 Tamil Nadu Legislative Assembly election: Karaikudi
Party	Candidate	Votes	%	±%
TVK	T. K. Prabhu	101,358	44.21	New
INC	Mangudi S	55,284	24.11	▼11.64
AMMK	Dherpoki V. Pandi	33,352	14.55	▼6.57
NTK	Seeman	30,793	13.46	▲2.15
Independent	Independent candidates	5,200	2.27	New
Others	Other party candidates	2,761	1.2	New
NOTA	None of the above	519	0.23	▼0.40
Margin of victory		46,074	20.10	▲9.94
Turnout		2,29,267	74.89	▲7.88
Registered electors		3,06,124		▼10,917
TVK gain from INC		Swing	▲44.21	

=== 2021 ===
2021 Tamil Nadu Legislative Assembly election: Karaikudi
Party	Candidate	Votes	%	±%
INC	S. Mangudi	75,954	35.75	−10.64
BJP	H. Raja	54,365	25.59	+23.12
AMMK	Dherpoki V. Pandi	44,864	21.12	
MNM	S. Rajkumar	8,351	3.93	
NOTA	Nota	1,349	0.63	−0.70
PT	B. Vanitha	702	0.33	
BSP	N. Baluswamy	652	0.31	−0.49
Independent	N. Meenal	548	0.26	
Independent	K. Velu	504	0.24	
Independent	M. Naina Mohamed	416	0.20	
Margin of victory		21,589	10.16	+1.08
Turnout		212,456	67.01	−3.28
Rejected ballots		304	0.14	
Registered electors		317,041		
INC hold		Swing	-10.64	

=== 2016 ===
2016 Tamil Nadu Legislative Assembly election: Karaikudi
Party	Candidate	Votes	%	±%
INC	K. R. Ramasamy	93,419	46.40	6.58
AIADMK	Karpagam Ilango	75,136	37.32	−13.70
MDMK	S. Sevanthiappan	14,279	7.09	
BJP	V. Muthulakshmi	4,969	2.47	−0.02
NOTA	None Of The Above	2,688	1.33	
BSP	K. Saravanan	1,601	0.80	−0.55
PMK	P. R. Duraipandi	897	0.45	
NMK	R. Rajkumar	723	0.36	
Independent	K. Rabiq Raja	547	0.27	
Independent	Tamilkarthick	471	0.23	
Margin of victory		18,283	9.08	−2.12
Turnout		201,355	70.30	−4.08
Registered electors		286,435		
INC gain from AIADMK		Swing	-4.62	

=== 2011 ===
2011 Tamil Nadu Legislative Assembly election: Karaikudi
Party	Candidate	Votes	%	±%
AIADMK	C. T. Palanichamy	86,104	51.01	14.67
INC	K. R. Ramasamy	67,204	39.81	−8.89
BJP	V. Chidambaram	4,194	2.48	−0.40
IJK	S. Asaithambi	3,895	2.31	
BSP	N. Baluswamy	2,272	1.35	
Independent	R. Rajkumar	1,728	1.02	
JMM	S. Anandhakumar	999	0.59	
Independent	R. Karasingam	885	0.52	
Independent	K. Rabiq Raja	772	0.46	
Independent	U. Maheswaran	744	0.44	
Margin of victory		18,900	11.20	−1.16
Turnout		168,797	74.38	11.37
Registered electors		226,934		
AIADMK gain from INC		Swing	2.31	

=== 2006 ===
2006 Tamil Nadu Legislative Assembly election: Karaikudi
Party	Candidate	Votes	%	±%
INC	N. Sundaram	64,013	48.70	
AIADMK	O. L. Venkatachalam	47,767	36.34	
DMDK	D. Baskaran	13,094	9.96	
BJP	N. K. Raman	3,787	2.88	−45.52
Independent	H. Mohamed Hanifa	1,833	1.39	
Independent	P. L. Alagappan	938	0.71	
Margin of victory		16,246	12.36	10.88
Turnout		131,432	63.01	3.88
Registered electors		208,583		
INC gain from BJP		Swing	0.30	

=== 2001 ===
2001 Tamil Nadu Legislative Assembly election: Karaikudi
Party	Candidate	Votes	%	±%
BJP	H. Raja	54,093	48.40	47.74
TMC(M)	S. P. Udayappan	52,442	46.93	
Independent	S. Venkatesan	2,937	2.63	
Independent	K. Rajendran	1,280	1.15	
Independent	Ar. Periasamy	1,001	0.90	
Margin of victory		1,651	1.48	−39.80
Turnout		111,753	59.13	−4.08
Registered electors		189,003		
BJP gain from TMC(M)		Swing	-14.58	

=== 1996 ===
1996 Tamil Nadu Legislative Assembly election: Karaikudi
Party	Candidate	Votes	%	±%
TMC(M)	N. Sundaram	76,888	62.98	
AIADMK	M. Raju	26,504	21.71	−43.97
MDMK	K. R. Asokan	10,055	8.24	
Independent	Karuppiah Pazha	5,378	4.41	
Independent	C. Muthiah	1,904	1.56	
BJP	R. M. Alagappan	810	0.66	−1.25
Independent	M. Abdul Latif	178	0.15	
Independent	S. J. Simon Paul Jayasingh	155	0.13	
Independent	S. P. Perumal	151	0.12	
Independent	K. A. V. Samlappan	53	0.04	
Margin of victory		50,384	41.27	6.28
Turnout		122,076	63.21	3.02
Registered electors		200,521		
TMC(M) gain from AIADMK		Swing	-2.70	

=== 1991 ===
1991 Tamil Nadu Legislative Assembly election: Karaikudi
Party	Candidate	Votes	%	±%
AIADMK	M. Karpagam	71,912	65.68	46.49
DMK	C. T. Chidambaram	33,601	30.69	−10.55
BJP	N. G. Karunakaran	2,090	1.91	0.63
Independent	S. Abdul Rahman	651	0.59	
Independent	O. M. Ganesan	335	0.31	
Independent	V. Arunachalam	248	0.23	
Independent	S. Rajendran	216	0.20	
Independent	K. Nagalingam	200	0.18	
Independent	M. Karpagam	167	0.15	
Independent	P. Vairamuthu	63	0.06	
Margin of victory		38,311	34.99	12.94
Turnout		109,483	60.19	−7.71
Registered electors		188,714		
AIADMK gain from DMK		Swing	24.44	

=== 1989 ===
1989 Tamil Nadu Legislative Assembly election: Karaikudi
Party	Candidate	Votes	%	±%
DMK	R. M. Narayanan	45,790	41.24	2.17
AIADMK	S. P. Durairasu	21,305	19.19	−29.79
Independent	S. Shanmugam	19,856	17.88	
AIADMK	K. Geeva Ram Anandh	18,573	16.73	−32.25
Independent	V. Arujothi	1,672	1.51	
TNC(K)	V. Gopal	1,658	1.49	
BJP	A. Rasa	1,416	1.28	
Independent	C. Sekar	366	0.33	
Independent	Rasendran	205	0.18	
Independent	Nachiappan Kr	188	0.17	
Margin of victory		24,485	22.05	12.15
Turnout		111,029	67.90	−5.16
Registered electors		166,611		
DMK gain from AIADMK		Swing	-7.74	

=== 1984 ===
1984 Tamil Nadu Legislative Assembly election: Karaikudi
Party	Candidate	Votes	%	±%
AIADMK	S. P. Durairasu	47,760	48.98	1.54
DMK	C. T. Chidambaram	38,101	39.08	−12.70
Independent	K. R. Boominathan	11,324	11.61	
Independent	M. Gunasekaran	319	0.33	
Margin of victory		9,659	9.91	5.58
Turnout		97,504	73.05	5.10
Registered electors		141,404		
AIADMK gain from DMK		Swing	-2.80	

=== 1980 ===
1980 Tamil Nadu Legislative Assembly election: Karaikudi
Party	Candidate	Votes	%	±%
DMK	C. T. Chidambaram	46,541	51.78	30.47
AIADMK	P. Kaliappan	42,648	47.45	15.42
Independent	R. M. Alagappan	697	0.78	
Margin of victory		3,893	4.33	4.05
Turnout		89,886	67.96	1.39
Registered electors		133,753		
DMK gain from AIADMK		Swing	19.75	

=== 1977 ===
1977 Tamil Nadu Legislative Assembly election: Karaikudi
Party	Candidate	Votes	%	±%
AIADMK	P. Kaliyappan	27,403	32.03	
INC	P. Chidambaram	27,163	31.75	
DMK	C. T. Chidambaram	18,228	21.31	−38.51
JP	P. L. Karuppia	12,763	14.92	
Margin of victory		240	0.28	−19.36
Turnout		85,557	66.57	−4.91
Registered electors		130,184		
AIADMK gain from DMK		Swing	-27.79	

=== 1971 ===
1971 Tamil Nadu Legislative Assembly election: Karaikudi
Party	Candidate	Votes	%	±%
DMK	C. T. Chidambaram	39,986	59.82	
SWA	S. P. R. Ramaswamy	26,858	40.18	
Margin of victory		13,128	19.64	−5.38
Turnout		66,844	71.47	−4.81
Registered electors		98,287		
DMK gain from SWA		Swing	1.09	

=== 1967 ===
1967 Madras Legislative Assembly election: Karaikudi
Party	Candidate	Votes	%	±%
SWA	S. Meiyappan	38,310	58.73	
INC	C. V. C. V. V. Chettiar	21,992	33.71	−7.45
CPI	R. H. Nathan	4,928	7.55	
Margin of victory		16,318	25.02	16.87
Turnout		65,230	76.28	7.54
Registered electors		89,938		
SWA hold		Swing	9.42	

=== 1962 ===
1962 Madras Legislative Assembly election: Karaikudi
Party	Candidate	Votes	%	±%
SWA	Saw Ganesan	27,890	49.31	
INC	A. I. Subbiah Ambalam	23,282	41.16	−7.18
CPI	Halyasanathan	5,393	9.53	
Margin of victory		4,608	8.15	4.44
Turnout		56,565	68.74	11.12
Registered electors		84,983		
SWA gain from INC		Swing	0.96	

=== 1957 ===
1957 Madras Legislative Assembly election: Karaikudi
Party	Candidate	Votes	%	±%
INC	M. A. Muthiah Chettiar	24,223	48.34	−10.47
Independent	Ganesan Saw	22,365	44.63	
Independent	R. M. Subbiah Chettiar	2,348	4.69	
Independent	U. P. L. Venkatachalam Chettiar	1,171	2.34	
Margin of victory		1,858	3.71	−25.70
Turnout		50,107	57.61	2.22
Registered electors		86,971		
INC hold		Swing	-10.47	

=== 1952 ===
1952 Madras Legislative Assembly election: Karaikudi
Party	Candidate	Votes	%	±%
INC	Chockalingam Chettiar	23,868	58.81	58.81
Independent	Mahalingam Chettiar	11,932	29.40	
Socialist Party (India)	Lakshmanan	4,782	11.78	
Margin of victory		11,936	29.41	
Turnout		40,582	55.39	
Registered electors		73,261		
INC win (new seat)				
