= Mithun Tejasvi =

Indian actor

- Born: Mithun Tejasvi; 16 December 1979 (age 46); Mudigere, Karnataka, India
- Occupation: Actor
- Years active: 1998–present
- Spouse: Rohini
- Parent(s): Lakshman; Shalini

Mithun Tejasvi (born 16 December 1979) is an Indian actor who has acted in Kannada and Tamil language films.

== Personal life ==
Mithun Tejasvi married Rohini, a software engineer, on 26 March 2006.

== Filmography ==
Year	Film	Role	Language	Notes
1998	Mari Kannu Hori Myage		Kannada	
1999	Aryabhata		Kannada	
2001	Halu Sakkare	Rahul	Kannada	
2002	Gummalam	Dinesh	Tamil	
2003	Indru Mudhal	Balamurali Krishna	Tamil	
2003	Aahaa Ethanai Azhagu	Chandru	Tamil	
2006	Seven O' Clock	Rahul	Kannada	
2006	Akasha Gange	Akash	Kannada	
2007	E Preethi Onthara	Rahul	Kannada	
2008	Sandai	Abhi's ex-Finance	Tamil	
2009	Kannukulle	Raghu	Tamil	
2010	Varshadhaare		Kannada	
2010	Magane En Marumagane	Raghu	Tamil	
2010	Antharathma	Shyam	Kannada	
2012	Ullam	Raja	Tamil	Delayed release, Shot in 2003; Straight-to-video film
2014	Inippu Pulippu		Tamil	

== Television ==
Year	Title	Role	Language	Channel	Notes
2015–2018	Apoorva Raagangal	Mahadev (Dev)/ Steven Raj	Tamil	Sun TV	
2017	Naaga Kannike	Mahendra Varma	Kannada	Colors Super	
2018–2021	Kamali	Chandru Mahajan	Kannada	Zee Kannada	
2019–2020	Ranganayaki	Chakravarthy	Kannada	Colors Kannada	
2020–2022	Kavyanjali	Kailash	Kannada	Udaya TV	
2021–2023	Thalattu	Producer	Tamil	Sun TV	
2022–2023	Ramachaari		Kannada	Colors Kannada	
2024–present	Meghasandesam	Sharath Chandra	Telugu	Zee Telugu	
2026–present	Agnisakshi - Hasemaneyali Hanebarahavu	Aravind	Kannada	Colors Kannada	
