= Subramaniam Siva =

Indian film director and actor

- Born: Tamil Nadu, India
- Occupations: Film director, actor
- Years active: 2003–present

Subramaniam Siva is an Indian film director and actor who works in the Tamil film industry.

== Career ==
=== Directing ===
Subramaniam Siva made his debut with the romantic comedy Thiruda Thirudi in 2003, featuring Dhanush and Chaya Singh. The success of the film meant that he later remade it in Telugu as Donga Dongadi (2004) with a new cast. He subsequently went on to make Pori (2007) featuring Jiiva, and then took the opportunity of directing Ameer in Yogi (2009), his debut film as an actor, which took two years to make.

His fifth directorial movie was Seedan (2011), a remake of the 2002 Malayalam film Nandanam, and the film featured Unni Mukundan and Ananya in the lead roles, while Dhanush made a guest appearance. He went on to help with the post-production of Velaiilla Pattadhari (2014) and also went on to write dialogues for Amma Kanakku (2016).

He made his comeback to directing with the 2021 film Vellai Yaanai, a film starring Samuthirakani, Athmiya Rajan, and Yogi Babu. The film released live on Sun TV.

=== Acting ===
Subramaniam Siva started his acting career with the 2018 film Vada Chennai and later acted in the 2019 film Asuran. Both films were directed by Vetrimaaran and starred Dhanush in the lead role. In 2021, he played a supporting role in the crime film Writer.

== Filmography ==
Director

| Year | Film | Notes | Ref |
|---|---|---|---|
| 2003 | Thiruda Thirudi | | |
| 2004 | Donga Dongadi | Telugu film, remake of Thiruda Thirudi | |
| 2007 | Pori | | |
| 2009 | Yogi | | |
| 2011 | Seedan | | |
| 2021 | Vellai Yaanai | | |

Actor

| Year | Film | Role | Ref |
|---|---|---|---|
| 2018 | Vada Chennai | Mani | |
| 2019 | Asuran | Murugan | |
| 2021 | Meendum | | |
| 2021 | Writer | Xavier | |
| 2023 | Maruthi Nagar Police Station | | |
| 2023 | Aneethi | | |
| 2024 | Vithaikkaaran | | |
| 2024 | Kaaduvetty | | |
| 2024 | Uyir Thamizhukku | | |
| 2024 | 7/G | Mani | |
| 2025 | DNA | Rajendran | |
| 2025 | Mask | Mathi | |
| 2026 | Fourth Floor | Viswam | |
| 2026 | Battle | Krishna | |
| 2026 | Nooru Saami | | |
| 2026 | Lakshmikanthan Kolai Vazhakku | Dharman | |
| 2026 | All Pass | | |
