= C. T. Chidambaram =

Indian politician

C. T. Chidambaram is an Indian politician and former Member of the Legislative Assembly of Tamil Nadu. He was elected to the Tamil Nadu legislative assembly as a Dravida Munnetra Kazhagam candidate from Karaikudi constituency in 1971 and 1980 elections.

His wife CT.Unnamalai achi was also elected as karaikudi Municipality chairman from DMK party.He got 3 daughters.
