= Chandhamama =

2013 Indian film by R. Radhakrishnan

- Directed by: R. Radhakrishnan
- Produced by: Murali
- Starring: Karunas; Shweta Prasad; Harish Kalyan
- Cinematography: Anandakuttan
- Edited by: G. Murali
- Music by: Srikanth Deva
- Release date: 1 March 2013
- Country: India
- Language: Tamil

Chandhamama is a 2013 Indian Tamil language comedy film written and directed by R. Radhakrishnan. The film stars Karunas, Shweta Prasad and Harish Kalyan. The film was released on 1 March 2013 to negative reviews.

== Cast ==
- Karunas as Santhanakrishnan (Chandamama)
- Shweta Prasad as Mary
- Harish Kalyan as Yuvan
- R. Sundarrajan as Chief Editor
- G. M. Kumar as J. Kanthan
- Ilavarasu as Santhanakrishnan's father
- M. S. Bhaskar as Krishnamoorthy
- Kottachi as Santhanakrishnan's assistant
- Maran as Santhanakrishnan's assistant
- Rinson Simon as Santhanakrishnan's assistant
- Sujatha as Santhanakrishnan's mother
- Mohan Ram as Church Father
- Madhan Bob as Amudham newspaper employee
- Crane Manohar as Auto driver
- Bava Lakshmanan as Theatregoer
- Srikanth Deva as himself
- Sridhar as himself ("Narayana")
- Ragasya as an item number
- "Ratsasan" Saravanan as Yuvan's friend (uncredited)

== Soundtrack ==
Music was composed by Srikanth Deva.

No.	Song	Singers	Lyrics
1	"Koyambedu Silk Akka"	Karunas	Karunas
2	"Kandene"	Suraj Jagan	Kanniappan
3	"Yaarodi"	Aalap Raju, Srimathumitha	Vairamuthu
4	"Narayana"	T. L. Maharajan, Vicky, Akku	Vairamuthu
