= Seedan =

- Theatrical release poster
- Directed by: Subramaniam Siva
- Story by: Ranjith (Original Story); Subramaniam Siva (Additional Story)
- Based on: Nandanam by Ranjith
- Produced by: Amit Mohan
- Starring: Dhanush; Unni Mukundan; Ananya
- Cinematography: Srinivas Devamsam
- Edited by: Ram Sudharsan
- Music by: Dhina
- Production company: Myth Productions
- Release date: 25 February 2011
- Running time: 135 minutes
- Country: India
- Language: Tamil

Seedan (transl. Disciple) is a 2011 Indian Tamil-language romantic fantasy drama film directed by Subramaniam Siva. The film stars Dhanush, Unni Mukundan and Ananya, while Sheela, Suhasini Mani Ratnam, Vivek, Ponvannan, and Ilavarasu appear in supporting roles.

The film, a remake of the 2002 Malayalam film, Nandanam, was released on 25 February 2011 to mixed reviews. It was dubbed in Telugu as Mahalakshmi.

== Plot ==
Mahalakshmi is a servant at the residence of the elderly Amritavalli. Everyone is really fond of her and treats her as a family member, rather than a servant. However, she finds herself doing all the work in the house. She is also a great devotee of Lord Murugan. Despite residing in Pazhani, she is unable to attend a Murugan temple there.

In a dream, Maha finds herself at her wedding with an unknown man. The next day, that man comes to the house. He is none other than Amritavalli's own grandson Mano Ramalingam. He falls in love with Maha. Maha, though hesitant at first, finds herself in love with him as well. Mano constantly assures Maha that his mother will arrange their marriage. However, as fate would have it, Mano is afraid to admit to his mother Thangam that he is in love. This encourages Thangam to fix his marriage with her childhood friend's daughter. However, when Thangam learns of the love affair, she is helpless, and all she can do is encourage the lovebirds to forget each other. Soon, everyone (except Amritavalli, Thangam, and Mano) treats Maha as a servant, not a family member. Maha, angry, claims to Lord Murugan that she will not face him ever again.

Enter Saravanan, a cook appointed by Madhava Gounder. Everyone loves Saravanan's cooking. However, Maha disapproves as cooking was her only peaceful hobby in the house after she fell in love. Saravanan is told to stay in the guest house where Gumbidiswamy is staying. However, Gumbidiswamy is staying at their home because he is a fraud trying to pass himself off as a swami. It does not take Saravanan long to realize that Gumbidiswamy is a fraud, and he uses this to blackmail him. Having control over Gumbidiswamy, Saravanan makes him tell everyone that, according to background and religious research, Mano and his fiancée are not suitable for each other.

After doing many things such as this, Saravanan is able to unite Maha and Mano. Thangam and Amritavalli agree to let Mano marry Maha. On the day of their wedding, Maha and Mano search for Saravanan to thank him for his help. Instead of Saravanan, another person comes and claims to be the only Saravanan in the area. Disappointed, Maha goes to Murugan's altar to pray, and there she sees Saravanan. He soon fades away. At that point, Maha understood that Saravanan was Murugan himself.

The film ends with a message that God may come down to earth in a human form to help those in need.

== Cast ==
As per the film's opening and end credits:

- Dhanush as Saravanan and Murugan (extended cameo appearance)
- Chemeen Sheela as Amritavalli
- Suhasini Maniratnam as Thangam
- Vivek as Gumbidi Swami
- Unni Mukundan as Mano Ramalingam (credited as Jai Krishna)
- Ananya as Mahalakshmi
- Ponvannan as Vijay
- Manobala as Sozhiyoor Somalingam
- Ilavarasu as Madhava Kounder
- Mayilsamy as Gumbidiswamy's follower
- Cell Murugan as Gumbidiswamy's assistant
- Meera Krishnan as Janaki
- P. S. Seethalakshmi
- Seeni Amma

== Production ==
In early 2003, Sibi Sathyaraj was set to make his acting debut through Swami, the Tamil remake of the Malayalam film Nandanam (2003), directed by Renjith. Navya Nair was cast as the lead actress and A. R. Rahman was considered as the music composer, in the film to be produced by Swargachitra Appachan. However, despite beginning pre-production work, the film was later dropped.

== Music ==
The soundtrack album was composed by Dhina in his 50th film.

Seedan

Soundtrack album by Dhina
- Released: 11 February 2011
- Genre: Feature film soundtrack
- Producer: Dhina

Dhina chronology
Vallakottai (2010)	Seedan (2011)	Bhavani (2011)

#	Track-Title	Singer(s)	Lyrics
1	"Enadhu"	V. V. Prasanna, Aalap Raju, Janaki Iyer	Yugabharathi
2	"Munpani"	Shreya Ghoshal	Pa. Vijay
3	"Oru Naal Mattum"	K. S. Chithra	Pa. Vijay
4	"Saravana Samaiyal"	Dhanush, Hariharan, Yesudas	Pa. Vijay
5	"Valliamma"	Shankar Mahadevan, Chinnaponnu	Pa. Vijay
6	"Yaadhumaagiye"	Shankar Mahadevan, Kavita Krishnamurthy	Pa. Vijay

== Reception ==
=== Critical response ===
The Times of India gave the film three out of five stars and wrote that "Though Subramaniam Siva meanders in the first half by making substantial changes in the original, he displays a much better grip in the second, which makes the movie an enjoyable watch". Pavithra Srinivasan of Rediff.com rated the film 2/5 stars and wrote, "A lot less histrionics and a more realistic screenplay, and this movie might have scored. As it is, Seedan doesn't live up to expectations". A critic from Sify wrote, "On the whole, Seedan lacks subtleties and nuances of the original. If you like old-fashioned melodramatic family dramas with a message that true love will triumph against all odds, then it is your cup of tea".
