= Cholan C. T. Palanichamy =

Indian politician

Cholan C. T. Palanichamy is an Indian politician and was a member of the 14th Tamil Nadu Legislative Assembly from the Karaikudi constituency. He represented the All India Anna Dravida Munnetra Kazhagam party.

The elections of 2016 resulted in his constituency being won by K. R. Ramasamy.
