= Lilly Rani =

2022 Tamil language drama film

- Directed by: Vishnu Ramakrishnan
- Starring: Chaya Singh; Thambi Ramaiah; Dushyanth Jayaprakash
- Release date: 9 September 2022
- Running time: 95 mins
- Country: India
- Language: Tamil

Lilly Rani is a 2022 Indian Tamil-language drama film directed by Vishnu Ramakrishnan and starring Chaya Singh, Thambi Ramaiah and Dushyanth Jayaprakash. It was released on 9 September 2022.

== Cast ==
- Chaya Singh as Rani
- Thambi Ramaiah as Moorthy
- Dushyanth Jayaprakash as Michael
- Jayaprakash
- Boopalan
- Raqath Fathima
- Akash Ram as Police Constable

== Reception ==
The film was released on 9 September 2022 across Tamil Nadu. A critic from Maalai Malar gave the film a mixed review, noting that it "could have been better". Logesh Balachandran critic from Times of India gave the film a negative review, writing "director Vishnu Ramakrishnan's idea to start this film as an emotional drama and to end it as a quirky thriller is laudable. But the writing isn't organic and does nothing to keep us engrossed".
