= S. Mangudi =

Indian politician

Member of the Tamil Nadu Legislative Assembly
- Incumbent
- Assumed office 12 May 2021
- Preceded by: K. R. Ramasamy
- Constituency: Karaikudi

Personal details
- Party: Indian National Congress
- Parent: M. Santhaiya (father)

Santhaiya Mangudi is an Indian politician who is a Member of Legislative Assembly of Tamil Nadu. He was elected from Karaikudi as an Indian National Congress candidate in 2021.

== Elections contested ==
Election	Constituency	Party	Result	Vote %	Runner-up	Runner-up Party	Runner-up vote %
2021 Tamil Nadu Legislative Assembly election	Karaikudi	INC	Won	35.75%	H. Raja	BJP	25.59%
