= Chitte =

Indian Kannada-language romantic drama film

- VCD cover
- Directed by: Dinesh Baboo
- Written by: Dinesh Baboo
- Produced by: C Pandu
- Starring: Anirudh; Chaya Singh
- Cinematography: P K H Das
- Edited by: B S Kemparaj
- Music by: V. Manohar
- Production company: Chennam Productions
- Release date: 16 October 2001
- Country: India
- Language: Kannada

Chitte (transl. Butterfly) is a 2001 Indian Kannada-language romantic drama film directed by Dinesh Baboo and starring Anirudh and Chaya Singh.

== Cast ==
- Ananth Nag as Shanthi's father
- Anirudh as Anil
- Chaya Singh as Shanthi
- Dwarakish as a lorry driver
- Chitra Shenoy
- Damini
- Avinash
- Ramesh Pandit
- M. S. Umesh as a doctor
- Mandeep Roy
- Sharan as Putnarsa
- Master Anand
- Vinayak Joshi
- Vanitha Vasu
- Vijayalakshmi Singh

== Production ==
The film marked the debut of Aniruddha Jatkar and the lead debut of Chaya Singh. The film has eight songs by V. Manohar including one poem by D. R. Bendre. Re-recording for the film was set to begin on 25 August 2001. Some scenes were shot at Mayura Valley view guest house at Srirangapatna.

== Music ==
The music was composed by V. Manohar, who also wrote the lyrics.

Track listing
No.	Title	Singer(s)	Length
1.	"Twinkle Twinkle Little Star"	Gurukiran	4:32
2.	"Chitte Chitte Haaditho"	Rajesh Krishnan, K. S. Chithra	4:48
3.	"Olavalli Nanna"	K. S. Chithra	5:33
4.	"Olagade Yaar Illa"	Rajesh Krishnan	3:54
5.	"Namma Maneya"	Rajesh Krishnan	5:15
6.	"Chora Chori"	Gurukiran	4:39
7.	"Yaarigu Helonubeda"	C. Ashwath	3:18
8.	"Belakku Iruvatanakane"	Rajesh Krishnan, K. S. Chithra	4:12
Total length:			36:11

== Release and reception ==
The film was initially scheduled to release in the first week of October. Chaya Singh was conscious about how Chitte would fare at the box office and did not commit to any films for almost half a year.

Sify wrote "Dinesh Babu tries to recreate the magic of his earlier film Chitra and Laali, still Chitte falls flat. He is trying to serve sour wine in the same old bottle! Babu it is time to avoid this theory of making hay while the sun shines. The audience on the first day itself was hooting".
