= Apoorva Raagangal (TV series) =

Indian Tamil-language soap opera

- Genre: Soap opera
- Written by: Dialogues by I.Asokan; S.R.Ravi
- Screenplay by: Devi Bala; S.P.Azhagu; P.S.Krishnamoorthy
- Directed by: Justin Jeyaraj (001-385); S. Jeevarajan (386-664); P.S.Dharan (665-859)
- Creative director: Sunil Thakur
- Starring: Shruthi Raj; Mithun; Nithya Ravindran; Akhila; Bhagya; J.Lalitha; Ranjit Babu; Lenin Anpan
- Theme music composer: Prashathini Prem
- Opening theme: "Koncham Purava" (vocals); Subramaniyam; Sai lakshmi; Aishwarya; Asvitha; Dr.Krithaya (lyrics)
- Country of origin: India
- Original language: Tamil
- No. of episodes: 859

Production
- Producers: Santhosh J. Nair; Baburaj Thomas; S. R. Leelaram
- Cinematography: J. Sathappan Narayanan; C. Nachiyappan Pillai
- Editor: D.Giri Babu
- Camera setup: Multi-camera
- Running time: approx. 20-22 minutes per episode
- Production company: The Purple Productions

Original release
- Network: Sun TV
- Release: 10 August 2015 – 7 July 2018

Apoorva Raagangal is a 2015 Indian Tamil-language soap opera that aired on Sun TV. The show premiered on 10 August 2015 and aired for 859 episodes until 7 July 2018. The show starred Shruthi Raj and Mithun. The show was directed by Justin Jeyaraj and produced by The Purple Productions.

== Cast ==
=== Main cast ===
- Shruthi Raj as Pavithira
- Mithun as Dev / Stephen Raj (Stephen Raj was killed by Swetha)

=== Recurring cast ===
- Swetha as Swetha Stephen Raj
- Akhila as Madhavi
- Sai Madhavi as Revathi
- Nikitha Murali as Chandhrika
- Chandhini Prakash as Gayathri
- J.Lalitha as Balamani Dev's mother
- Balambika/ Bhagya as Mariamma
- C.V.Ravishankaran as Muthupandian and Sankarapandian (Dual role)
- Nithya Ravindran as Padmini's Mom
- Lenin Anpan
- Balaji as Pandiyan IPS
- T.V.V.Ramanujam as Pavithra's father
- Mounicka Devi\ Hanshika as Subhulakshmi aka Subha
- Shanthi Anandraj as Shanthi
- Yamuna as Indhira
- Sanjay as Arivu
- Kalyan as Prabhu
- Vijay Anand as Deena
- Egavalli as Padmini
- Shanthi Anandraj as Pandiyan's mother
- S.V.S Kumar as Mariamma's father
- Jai Ganesh as Ram
- Sundari
- Baby Monika Devi as Malini
- Baby Soukiya as Nisha
- Vairam as Ammavasai
- Guru as Kishore
- VJ Saravanan kumar as Villan
- Kalyani
- Sharmila
- A. Pandy
- Pandidurai
- Raman as Hari
- Denappan
- Keerthi Shrathah as Kavitha
- Kirushnakanth as Krishna
- Meena as Caroline
- Kalyan as Kathir
- Ahalya
- Kathir
- Premnath
- Vijayakumari
- Vasantha as Aswini
- Naveen as Navin
- Parvathi

== Original soundtrack ==
=== Title song ===
It was written by Dr. Krithaya, composed by Prashathini Prem and background score by Kiran. It was sung by Subramaniyam, Sai lakshmi, Aishwarya and Asvitha.

=== Soundtrack ===
Track listing
No.	Title	Lyrics	Singer(s)	Length
1.	"Konshum Purave un Tamil pechche" ("கொஞ்சும் புறாவே உன் தமிழ் பேச்சே")	Dr. Kiruthiya	Subramaniyam, Sai lakshmi, Aishwarya, Asvitha	2:05

== See also ==
- List of programs broadcast by Sun TV
