= Ullam (2012 film) =

2012 Indian film by Arunmoorthy

- DVD cover
- Directed by: Arunmoorthy
- Produced by: Vedha
- Starring: Mithun; Priyamani
- Cinematography: U. K. Senthil Kumar
- Edited by: Suresh Urs
- Music by: Yuvan Shankar Raja
- Release date: 16 March 2012
- Country: India
- Language: Tamil

Ullam (transl. Heart) is a 2012 Indian Tamil-language film directed by Arunmoorthy and produced by Vedha, starring Mithun and Priyamani, while Raghuvaran and Karunas amongst others in supporting roles.

The film has a music score composed by Yuvan Shankar Raja. The film after production delays failed to gain a theatrical release and was released straight to DVD in 2012.

== Cast ==
- Mithun as Raja
- Priyamani as Kavitha
- Divya
- Raghuvaran as Kavitha's father
- Karunas
- Vaiyapuri
- Ambika
- Anu Hasan
- Ponnambalam
- Pandu
- Japan Kumar (special appearance in the song "Kokkalanga Kuruvi")

== Production ==
Filming began in 2003, while Priyamani was still yet to have her first film release in Kangalal Kaidhu Sei. Made by Arulmurthy, an apprentice of director Shankar, the film was set and shot in Ooty and the team shot two songs in Nepal in mid 2003.

== Soundtrack ==
The music was composed by Yuvan Shankar Raja.

No.	Song	Singers	Lyrics	Length (m:ss)
1	"Kai Veesamma"	Harish Raghavendra, Chitra Sivaraman	Palani Bharathi	04:04
2	"Kannai Thiranthu"	Karthik, Mahathi	Na. Muthukumar	04:41
3	"Kokkalanga Kuruvi"	Ranjith	Kabilan	03:35
4	"Oh Iyarkayai"	Bhavatharini	Thabu Shankar	04:02
5	"Poove Poove"	P. Unnikrishnan	Thabu Shankar	05:16

== Release ==
The film was eventually released straight to DVD in 2012 and did not have a proper theatrical release.
