= N. Sundaram =

Indian politician (1953/1954–2026)

N. Sundaram (1953 or 1954 – 26 January 2026) was an Indian politician who was a Member of the Legislative Assembly from Tamil Nadu. He was elected to the Tamil Nadu Legislative Assembly as a Tamil Maanila Congress (Moopanar) candidate from Karaikudi constituency in 1996 election and as an Indian National Congress candidate in the 2006 elections.

Sundaram died following a fall in Sivaganga, on 26 January 2026, at the age of 72. He was undergoing a programme of kidney dialysis at the time.
