= Akasha Gange =

- Official poster
- Directed by: Dinesh Baboo
- Written by: Dinesh Baboo
- Produced by: Sudhakar; Srinath; Prakash
- Starring: Mithun Tejasvi; Chaya Singh
- Cinematography: Ravi Suvarna
- Edited by: Narahalli Jnanesh
- Music by: Deva
- Production company: S. G. Entertainments
- Release date: 13 June 2008
- Country: India
- Language: Kannada

Akasha Gange is a 2008 Indian Kannada-language romantic drama film directed by Dinesh Baboo and starring Mithun Tejasvi and Chaya Singh. The film was released after a two year delay. The film was reportedly produced under fraud and was a box office failure.

== Cast ==
- Mithun Tejasvi as Sonu
- Chaya Singh as Lakshmi alias Beena
- Vanitha Vasu as Lakshmi's foster mother
- Smitha
- Komal
- Doddanna
- Jayanthi
- Om Prakash Rao
- P. N. Sathya

== Production ==
The film began production in 2006. In the film, Chaya Singh plays an unwed mother, which was different from her previous girl next door roles.

== Music ==
The music was composed by Deva with lyrics by K. Kalyan.

Tracklist
No.	Title	Singer(s)	Length
1.	"Belagutide"	K. S. Chithra
2.	"Gange Gange"	S. P. Balasubrahmanyam
3.	"Kuhu Kogile"	K. S. Chithra
4.	"Lalli Lalli"	K. S. Chithra
5.	"Malli Malli"	S. P. Balasubrahmanyam, K. S. Chithra
6.	"Manase Prithiya Manase"	S. P. Balasubrahmanyam
7.	"Nanagagi Ninagagi"	K. S. Chithra
8.	"Ninna Kannu Neenu"	K. S. Chithra
Total length:			29:12

== Reception ==
A critic from Rediff.com wrote that "In a nutshell, a neatly packaged film worth watching". A critic from The Times of India wrote that "At a time when all action packed superstar films are bombing big time in Kannada, Akasha Gange comes as a whiff of fresh air".
