= K. R. Ramasamy =

K. R. Ramasamy (or Ramaswamy; pronounced [ɾ̪aːmasaːmi]) may refer to:

- K. R. Ramasamy (politician), Member of the Legislative Assembly (MLA) of Indian National Congress (INC) Party
- K. R. Ramasamy (actor), Indian actor and founding member of DMK Party
- K. R. Ramaswamy, popularly known as Traffic Ramaswamy, social activist
