= Thagappansamy =

- Title card
- Directed by: Shivashanmughan
- Written by: Shivashanmughan
- Produced by: Tiruchi Gopalji
- Starring: Prashanth; Pa. Ranjith; Pooja
- Cinematography: J. Sridhar
- Edited by: V. T. Vijayan
- Music by: Srikanth Deva
- Production company: Thirumalai Creations
- Release date: 28 December 2006
- Country: India
- Language: Tamil

Thagappansamy is a 2006 Indian Tamil-language action film directed by Shivashanmughan and produced by Tiruchi Gopalji. The film stars Prashanth, Pa. Ranjith and Pooja, while Namitha, Karunas and Vincent Asokan play supporting roles. Featuring music composed by Srikanth Deva, the film had a delayed release, on 28 December 2006, on account of production problems.

== Plot ==
The film begins with Kathirvel, a do-gooder going all out to get water for his village. With monsoon repeatedly failing, his village reels under drought, and he runs from pillar to post to get a well dug in the village. He manages to bring Shanmugham, a water-divining expert, to dig a well. Shanmugham, his wife, and daughter Marikozhundhu (Pooja) come to the village. Unfortunately, a freak mishap kills Shanmugham, and the villagers' search for water continues. To eke out their livelihood, all the villagers, led by Kadhirvel, decide to leave the village with a heavy heart to take up employment in a farmhouse in Rajasthan. Upon reaching the place, they come to know they have been taken as bonded labourers, and there is no way out but to work there tirelessly for the next three years. They undergo physical and mental torture from the greedy landlord Thakur Dass aided by his Marwadi sidekick Pa. Ranjith. A silver lining in the cloud is Swapna, Thakur's sister. She gets fascinated by Kadhirvel's heroics. The rest is how Kadhirvel fights for his men, helps them reach their village back without any danger and eventually marries Marikozhundhu.

== Cast ==
- Prashanth as Kathirvel
- Pooja as Marikozhundhu
- Namitha as Swapna
- Vincent Asokan as Thakur Dass
- Mahadevan as Shanmugam
- Karunas
- Thambi Ramaiah
- Besant Ravi
- Bava Lakshmanan
- Rajendranath
- Boys Rajan
- Pa. Ranjith as Commentator (uncredited)

== Production ==
Meera Jasmine had initially been signed by the production house to play the lead female role but backed out and Pooja was subsequently handed the role. Director Pa. Ranjith worked as an assistant director in this film and played a cameo. Prashanth worked for the film in 2005 simultaneously with several other projects, including ventures such as Venkatesh's Petrol and Ramesh Selvan's Runway, both of which were subsequently shelved. By October 2005, it was reported that most of the film's shoot was over and that the team had shot scenes across Tiruchi, Karaikudi, Gingee, Thenkasi and Rajasthan. One of the songs was shot at Gingee Fort with 80 dancers, 10 elephants and 20 horses. A website run by Indiaglitz.com was launched for the film in April 2006, coinciding with Prashanth's 33rd birthday.

== Soundtrack ==
The soundtrack was composed by Srikanth Deva, with lyrics written by Shiva Shanmugam.

Song	Singer(s)
"Paniyaram Suttu"	Udit Narayan, Malathy Lakshman
"Aariyamala"	Balaram, Sadhana Sargam
"Sangu Chakara"	Shankar Mahadevan
"Kadhal Muniva"	Anupama, Sathyan
"Aathi Sivanae"	Karunas, Chinna Ponnu, Shiva Shanmugam
"Semparuthi" (Bit)	Mukesh Mohamed
"Aararo Aariraro"	Mukesh Mohamed
"Puttukku" (Bit)	Ganga
"Porantha Manula" (Bit)	Mukesh Mohamed
"Mazhai Peiythu"	Baby Vaishali
"Irukangudi (Bit)"	Chinna Ponnu

== Critical reception ==
A critic from Sify noted that the film was "average" and claimed "the film starts on a promising note but the second half peters out into a mass masala. The decent first half has a good message and looks realistic but slowly down the lane the story loses track". Malini Mannath of Chennai Online wrote "It's a good theme the director has chosen and is well-intentioned. But with the treatment being superficial, it's like we are seeing the same commercial elements, maybe in a slightly different angle." Malathi Rangarajan of The Hindu wrote, "Shiva Shanmughan has shown that a strong story base combined with a smooth-flowing script is bound to touch the viewer. `Thagappansami' does". Lajjavathi of Kalki felt the plot has been handled unnaturally which is a huge drawback of screenplay and also felt the director, who gave the dialogues naturally and elegantly, could have given a kudos if he had taken some new issue in hand. Karunas bought the distribution rights of the film. The film became a failure at the box-office.
