= Excuse Me (2003 film) =

- DVD cover
- Directed by: Prem
- Written by: Prem; Malavalli Sai Krishna (dialogue)
- Produced by: N. M. Suresh
- Starring: Sunil Raoh; Ramya; Ajay Rao
- Cinematography: M. R. Seenu
- Edited by: Sanjeev - Lakshman
- Music by: R. P. Patnaik
- Production company: Sri Thulaja Bhavani Creations
- Release date: 5 December 2003
- Running time: 158 minutes
- Country: India
- Language: Kannada

Excuse Me is a 2003 Indian Kannada-language romantic drama film starring Sunil Raoh, Ramya and Ajay Rao in the lead roles. The film is directed by Prem of the blockbuster Kariya fame. The music was composed by R. P. Patnaik. The film was praised for its interesting storyline and its music.

== Plot ==
Ajay is a young boy who lives with his mother Parvati. He plays a musical instrument, sarangi very well. Looking at his music skills, a couple from the same village who now live in Bangalore take Ajay with them with Parvati's permission so that he could have better opportunities there. They also take the village head's spoilt son, Sunil along with them. Now, both the boys are grown up. While Ajay is a calm, innocent, humble man, Sunil, although being good at heart, is self-willed. Ajay, one day composes a tune all by himself. This is overheard by Madhu, a college student who immediately grows fond of it.

Madhu begins to like the one who played the tune and Ajay begins to like the girl (Madhu) who expressed her feelings for the composer of thua tune. Various instances take place which connect both Madhu and Ajay who then love each other without actually looking at each other's faces nor even knowing each other'sidentity. One day Sunil sees Madhu, falls in love with her and pretends to be the one who originally composed that tune which Madhu was admiring. Madhu believes this and later they get engaged to each other after convincing their families. On the other hand, Ajay keeps on searching for the girl who admired his composition but in vain. In the climax, Ajay plays his tune in a South Indian music competition as his own composition which angers Madhu. She urges Sunil to reveal to everybody that he is the real creator of that tune. Ultimately Sunil's caretakers reveal to Madhu that Sunil doesn't know anything about music but Ajay indeed composed that tune. Heartbroken Madhu then goes to Ajay as he was her true love.

== Cast ==
- Sunil Raoh as Sunil
- Ramya as Madhu
- Ajay Rao as Ajay
- Sumalatha as Parvati, Ajay's mother
- Ramakrishna as Madhu's father
- Thulasi Shivamani as Madhu's mother
- Ramesh Bhat as Sunil's father
- Mico Nagaraj
- Pavitra Lokesh
- Sanketh Kashi as college principal
- Kishan Shrikanth as Kishan
- Bullet Prakash
- Nanda Kishore
- Tarun Sudhir
- V. Nagendra Prasad
- Navya
- Rekha
- Ushakiran
- Petrol Prasanna (uncredited)

== Soundtrack ==
All lyrics are written by V. Nagendra Prasad; all music is composed by R. P. Patnaik.

Track listing
No.	Title	Singer(s)	Length
1.	"Excuse Me"	R. P. Patnaik, Nanditha	4:49
2.	"Brahma Vishnu Shiva"	Prem, Chorus	5:14
3.	"Sorry Sorry"	Tippu, Nanditha	4:15
4.	"Preethi Yeke Bhoomi Melide"	R. P. Patnaik, Usha	5:19
5.	"Thottilu Thugolige"	Prem, Madhukar	1:39
6.	"O Priyatama"	Nanditha	3:58
7.	"Preethige Janma"	Rajesh Krishnan	5:14
8.	"Preethige Janma"	Shankar Mahadevan	5:14
9.	"Preethse Antha"	Bombay Jayashree	4:48
10.	"Roadigili Radhika"	Gurukiran, R. P. Patnaik	5:05

== Release and reception ==
The film was originally scheduled to be released on the second week of November. A critic from Chitraloka wrote that "Let any film strike to your mind ‘Excuse Me’ is refreshing. Go Watch it". A critic from Viggy wrote that "Overall, is a good entertainer with a message - 'Love never dies but lover may'!" Indiainfo wrote "There is no connection between the title of the film and the story. A good effort by Prem though".

== Box office ==
The film ran for more than 220 days and became a blockbuster. The film ran for almost thirty-five weeks in Kapali Theatre in Bengaluru.
