= Freaky Chakra =

- DVD cover
- Directed by: V. K. Prakash; Ziba Bhagwagar
- Written by: Ziba Bhagwagar; Roohi Dixit; Apurva Kasaravalli; Ashwin Naidu; Geeta Thomas
- Produced by: V.K.Prakash
- Starring: Deepti Naval; Sunil Raoh; Ranvir Shorey; Sachin Khedekar
- Cinematography: K. U. Mohanan
- Edited by: Venkatesh Naidu
- Music by: Ouseppachan
- Production companies: Channel Nine Entertainment; Trends Adfilm Makers
- Distributed by: Channel Nine Entertainment Ltd.
- Release date: 7 February 2003
- Running time: 105 minutes
- Country: India
- Language: English

Freaky Chakra is a 2003 Indian English-language comedy-drama film directed by V. K. Prakash and Ziba Bhagwagar. The film stars Deepti Naval and Sachin Khedekar. The film was India's official entry for the Toronto Reel Asian International Film Festival, and received recognition by the International Federation of Film Critics at the 2003 Mumbai International Film Festival. The film featured songs in Hindi.

== Plot ==
The writer (Ranvir Shorey) tells the story and introduces the story characters one-by-one in a narrative style. Ms. Thomas (Deepti Naval) used to be a doctor and now works as a mortician. After her medical skills failed to save her husband, she decided to live alone and keep to herself. However, various events continue to keep her at odds with reality: she receives phone calls from a crank caller (Sachin Khedekar) who speaks to her in a raunchy manner; mischievous children repeatedly run away after ringing her doorbell; she is unable to bathe because her water does not operate; and her apartment manager is so tired of her complaints that he blocks his ears with cotton. In her routine, she begins to look forward to each distraction. When an uninvited guest (Sunil Raoh) takes up residence in her home, the two eventually have a romantic affair, changing her life and her outlook.

== Cast ==
- Deepti Naval as Ms. Thomas
- Ranvir Shorey as The writer
- Sachin Khedekar as The caller
- Pranam Janney as Mocking guy
- Sunil Raoh as Unannounced Guest
- Rajeev Ravindranathan as Ticket clerk

== Production ==
Principal photography began in Bangalore over a 21-day shoot schedule, and actress Deepti Naval stated that the film had been cut for the Indian film market to remove shots where her character took the lead in sex. The film was India's official entry for Toronto Reel Asian International Film Festival, and was released on 7 February 2003. The film is the only Hindi project for which Ouseppachan has composed music.

== Soundtrack ==
The film has soundtrack composed by Ouseppachan.

Track listing
No.	Title	Lyrics	Singer(s)	Length
1.	"Dil Mein Kuch Ho Raha Hai"	Shiven Surendranath, Roohi Dixit	KK	4:17
2.	"Na Chahiye Mujhe Koi" (Female version)	Shiven Surendranath	Devi	4:42
3.	"Banana Rap"	Shormistha Mukherjee	Suresh Peters	2:39
4.	"Kya Takdir Likhi Hai"	Shiven Surendranath, Kavitha Paul	Anupama Deshpande & Franco (Seven)	3:52
5.	"Dil Mein Kuch Ho Raha Hai" (Instrumental)	—	—	4:17
6.	"Love Potion No. 2"	Shormistha Mukherjee	David Pascal	3:00
7.	"Na Chahiye Mujhe Koi" (Male version)	Shiven Surendranath	Venugopal	4:41
8.	"Freaky Chakra"	Shiven Surendranath	KK, Ouseppachan, Franco, Ashvin Naidu, Ziba Bhagwagar	2:45
Total length:				30:13

== Critical reception ==
Because of its dealing with relationships between four persons, Times of India referred to the film as "rectangular love story", as opposed to "the cliched regular or triangular romantic stories that Bollywood generally churns out." The film created a stir after its release due to its dealing with one of the long time taboo subjects, age disparity in relationships with a woman on the older side. After its release, Times of India made note of a growing trend to depict such relationships more openly: Using the characters of Deepti Naval's Ms. Thomas in Prakash's Freaky Chakra, Juhi Chawla's Chandrika in Nagesh Kukunoor's 3 Deewarein, and Shabana Azmi's Radha in Deepa Mehta's Fire as examples of a changing trend in Indian cinema, they wrote that "Bollywood is now bent on giving the fairer sex a fair deal in sex."

Outlook India panned the film, offering that "Prakash's experiment with story-telling might sound promising on paper but fails to deliver on celluloid." They felt this was due to Ranvir Shorey's character of The Writer becoming an intrusive and "annoying obstruction" that hampered the film's action. They also felt that the characters were not fully fleshed out, writing they "don't get a life beyond their sentence-long descriptions", and that the relationships of the various characters are not allowed to grow, leaving the viewer with questions. They concluded that "Freaky Chakra is brash without any real sense of irreverence. It's meant to be fun, but doesn't even manage to elicit a smile. A joke of a film, and a bad joke at that."

Rediff wrote of the film, "You simply wonder why the film was made", noting that the storyline wasn't suitable for a Deepti Naval film, and that as the musical was "a fusion of classical and Western tunes," it would not appeal, offering only that the Hindi song Yeh dil ne kuch kaha hai was "beautifully rendered." They further felt the storyline and screenplay were too unconventional to attract a wide audience, and noted that the narrative of Ranvir Shorey as The Writer "tends to grate on your nerves at times." They granted that the Deepti Naval's character was "the most interesting" and that she "deserves credit" for her ability to have her acting speak louder than scripted words. They also noted that Sunil Raoh did a "decent job" and that Sachin Khedekar gave "a brilliant performance." But while acknowledging these points, they concluded "For all the performances, the characters are shallow and unexplained."

== Recognition ==
=== Awards and nominations ===
- 2003, Won FIPRESCI Prize "For the extraordinarily light treatment of very serious emotions, inhibitions and aspirations through the rich and innovative use of film language" at Mumbai International Film Festival
