= Thiruda Thirudi =

- Poster
- Directed by: Subramaniam Siva
- Written by: Subramaniam Siva
- Produced by: S. K. Krishnakanth
- Starring: Dhanush; Chaya Singh
- Cinematography: G. Ramesh
- Edited by: S. Satish; J. N. Harsha
- Music by: Dhina
- Production company: Indian Theatre Productions
- Release date: 5 September 2003
- Country: India
- Language: Tamil
- Budget: ₹2 crore
- Box office: est. ₹12 crore

Thiruda Thirudi (transl. Male Thief and Female Thief) is a 2003 Indian Tamil-language romantic comedy film written and directed by debutant Subramaniam Siva. The film stars Dhanush and Chaya Singh (in her Tamil film debut), with Karunas, Manikka Vinayagam, and Krishna in supporting roles. It was released on 5 September 2003 and became a success. The film was remade in Telugu as Donga Dongadi (2004) and in Kannada as Sakha Sakhi (2005).

== Plot ==
Vasudevan belongs to a middle-class family and is irresponsible and untrustworthy. Vijayalakshmi is from a traditional Telugu family and is an ambitious and career-oriented girl. Vasu and Viji meet up, and one day, he follows her on her two-wheeler. She is so bugged by him that she fails to notice a vehicle ahead. Though he cautions her, she ends up having an accident. Vasu admits her in the hospital, but Viji holds him responsible for her accident. Both of them are at loggerheads and bicker constantly. Vasu leaves for Chennai in order to prove himself to his father, who is constantly criticising his irresponsibility. Meanwhile, Viji gets a job at Chennai and moves into the same apartment complex as Vasu. The rest of the story follows Vasu's progress and deals with relationship between Vasu and Viji and whether or not their attitude for each other changed. Viji falls in love with Vasu, but he acts to hate her because she made him and his whole family separated. So in the middle, something happens, and they both end up loving each other. Vasu also got back together with his family after a couple of twists.

== Cast ==
As per the film's opening credits:

- Dhanush as Vasudevan aka Vasu
- Chaya Singh as Vijayalakshmi aka Viji (Voice dubbed by Mahalakshmi Kannan)
- Karunas as 'Rockfort' Chandru
- Manikka Vinayagam as Vasu's father
- Kambar Jayaraman as Narayanasamy Naidu
- Delhi Ganesh as Vasu's boss
- Scissor Manohar as Traffic Inspector
- Muthukaalai as Watchman
- Krishna as Ganesh
- Cool Suresh as Mukesh
- Sugi as Pooja
- S. V. Thangaraj as apartment president (voice dubbed by M. S. Bhaskar)
- Kousalya Senthamarai as Vasu's mother

Uncredited cast

- Chelladurai as Ekambaram
- Master Udayaraj as a naughty boy
- Bayilvan Ranganathan as Man in bar

== Production ==
Thiruda Thirudi is the directorial debut of Subramaniam Siva and the first Tamil film for producer S. K. Krishnakanth and actress Chaya Singh. This is Dhanush's third film release as an actor and the first film not made by his family members. The dappankuthu song "Manmadha Raasa" was shot at Kolar Gold Fields, Karnataka. According to the cinematographer G. Ramesh, the song was shot within two-and-a-half days.

== Soundtrack ==
The soundtrack was composed by Dhina. "Manmadha Raasa" became a popular song. It was later reused by as "Suntaragaali" in the Kannada film Kalasipalya (2004).

Track listing
No.	Title	Lyrics	Singer(s)	Length
1.	"Ayurveda Azhagi"	Na. Muthukumar	Manikka Vinayagam, Srilekha Parthasarathy	4:26
2.	"Azhaga Irukanga"	Tha. Kannan	Timmy, Devan Ekambaram, Master Kiran	4:22
3.	"Manmadha Raasa"	Yugabharathi	Shankar Mahadevan, Malathy Lakshman	4:48
4.	"Mutham Mutham"	Pa. Vijay	Anuradha Sriram	4:39
5.	"Unna Paartha"	Subramaniam Siva	Karthik, Pop Shalini	2:50
6.	"Vandar Kuzhazhi"	Kalaikumar	Udit Narayan, Radhika Thilak, Mimicry Senthil	4:45
Total length:				25:48

== Release and reception ==
Thiruda Thirudi was released on 5 September 2003 and became the second most successful Tamil film of the year. A critic from Screen noted "it was an offbeat love story marked by good performance by Dhanush which makes it a breezy entertainer." Malathi Rangarajan of The Hindu wrote "ARMED WITH a well-worked out success formula, new director Subramaniam Siva confidently enters the fray in Indian Theatre Production's "Thiruda Thirudi". He compensates for his flimsy storyline with screenplay that moves at full speed till the first half, sagging slightly only in the second, and dialogue that's completely in with the trend with all kinds of weird coinage typical of today's youth". Visual Dasan of Kalki praised the performance of Dhanush, Chaya Singh and Manikka Vinayagam and direction but panned the unnecessary vulgar scenes and dialogues.

== Remakes ==
The film was remade in Telugu as Donga Dongadi (2004) by the same director. It was also remade in Kannada as Sakha Sakhi (2005) where Chaya Singh reprised her role.
