= Chinnaponnu =

Indian singer

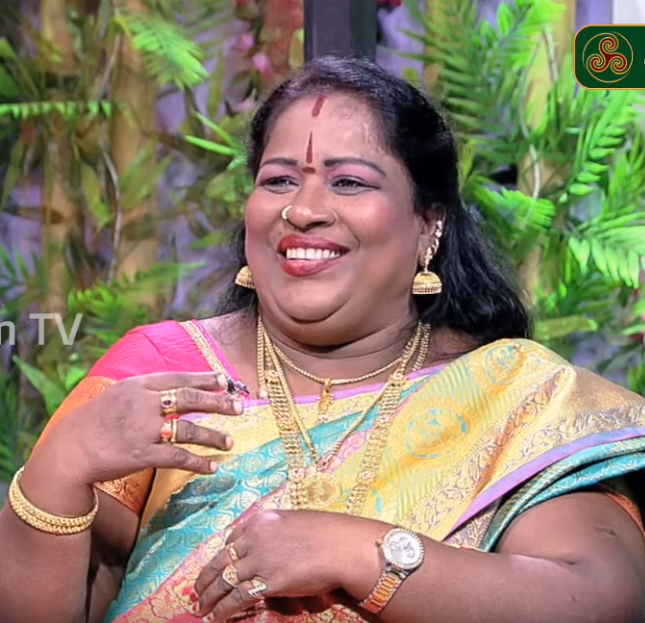
- Chinnaponnu in a Puthuyugam interview

Background information
- Born: Sivagangai, Tamil Nadu, India
- Genres: Filmi, Folk music
- Occupation: Playback singer
- Instrument: Vocalist
- Years active: 1990–current

Chinnaponnu (also credited as Chinna Ponnu or Chinnaponnu Kumar) is a folk and playback singer from the state of Tamil Nadu, India.

== Early life ==
Chinnaponnu was born in Suranam, a small village in Sivagangai district, Tamil Nadu, India. She started performing in temple festivals and churches when she was 13 years old. Soon afterwards, she began singing professionally in the troupe of fellow folk artist Kottaisamy, whom she credits as a mentor. Later her voice brought the attention of K.A. Gunasekaran, a leading researcher on the folk arts and folk songs of Tamil Nadu, who also had close ties to the Communist Party of India. Gunasekaran helped promote her performances in different parts of the state.

== Career ==
In 2004, she broke into the Tamil film industry as a playback singer with the song "Annanoda Paatu” in the hit film Chandramukhi, starring Rajinikanth and Jyothika. This led to television appearances and interest from other music directors.

In the year 2010, she won the Edition Award 2010 for the song "Theeka Theeka" from the film Suriyan Satta Kalloori directed by S.S. Pandian. In the same year she was also one of the artists featured in the theme song for the World Classical Tamil Conference 2010, composed by A. R. Rahman, with a video directed by Gautham Vasudev Menon.

In 2010 and 2011, her troupe was one of the headlining acts at the Chennai Sangamam festival. In June 2011, she appeared on MTV Coke Studio television series in the episodes 'Vethalai' and 'Tere Naam' along with singer Kailash Kher and Papon.

In 2012, she entered the Telugu film industry with the song Pattuko Pattuko in the hit movie Bus Stop with music by JB and G. Anil.

=== Nakku Mukka ===
Her next major hit, "Nakku Mukka", was featured in the 2008 film Kadhalil Vizhunthen. For this song she was honoured with the Kannadasan Award for best folk singer in a Tamil film. A different version of "Nakku Mukka" (with changed lyrics) was featured in a short Times of India ad film entitled A Day in the Life of Chennai, which won two Gold Lions at Cannes in 2009. The song even featured in the Bollywood hit film The Dirty Picture.

=== Bigg Boss Tamil ===
She was a contestant in Bigg Boss (Tamil season 5). She got eliminated on Day 28 due to the lack of public votes.

== Discography ==
=== Cassettes ===
Suriya Thoranam, her first audiocassette, released by Father Bakianathan.

Thannane, with songs written and composed by K.A. Gunasekaran, released by the CPI.

Chinnaponnu recorded many other cassettes in her childhood and young adulthood which were sold and circulated informally. A CD re-release of the best of these tracks is planned.

=== Solo CDs ===
Marikkozhunthae (Symphony Records, 2005)

Thannane Thannane (Symphony Records, 2009)

=== Playback singer ===
==== Tamil songs ====
Year	Song	Film	Music director	Notes
2005	Annanoda Pattu	Chandramukhi	Vidyasagar	
2006	Aathi Sivanae	Thagapansamy	Srikanth Deva	
2006	Mannarkudi Kalakalakka	Sivappathigaram	Vidyasagar	
2008	Naalugopura	Karuppusamy Kuththagaithaarar	Dheena	
2008	Nakku Mukka	Kadhalil Vizhunthen	Vijay Antony	
2008	Theeka Theeka	Suriyan Satta Kalloori	Deva	
2008	Dindu Kallu	Dindigul Sarathy	Dheena	
2009	Aakayam Edimughanka	Eesa	Haran	
2010	Kattu Sirukki (Slow Version)	Raavanan	A. R. Rahman	
2011	Aaravaili	Avargalum Ivargalum	Srikanth Deva	
2011	Valliamma	Seedan	Dhina	
2012	Anicham Poovazhagi	Thaandavam	G.V.Prakash Kumar	
2013	Anna Nadai	Thagaraaru	Dharan Kumar	
2013	Chikku Bukku	Madha Gaja Raja	Vijay Antony	
2014	Aaraaro Aaraaro	Pannaiyarum Padminiyum	Justin Prabhakaran	
2014	Moonu Kodi	Oru Kanniyum Moonu Kalavaanikalum	Natarajan Sankaran	
2014	Vodu Vodu Vodu	Bramman	Devi Sri Prasad	
2014	Hello Brother	Irumbu Kuthirai	G. V. Prakash Kumar	
2014	Kokkara Kozhi	Saivam	G. V. Prakash Kumar	
2015	Thappathaan Theriyum	Maari	Anirudh Ravichander	
2015	Oorellam Vettu Sattham	Thilagar	Kannan	
2015	Vatta Vatta	Seeni	Srikanth Deva	
2016	Love In Wheels - Theme	Thodari	D. Imman	
2016	Aararo	Katha Solla Porom	Pavan Kumar	
2016	Bam Bam Bambaram	Raja Mandhiri	Justin Prabhakaran	
2016	Oppaari	Saithan	Vijay Antony	
2018	Athamaga Pudikavillai	Kannakkol	Bobby	
2018	Koova	Ondraga Originals	Karthik	
2019	Vengamavan	Natpe Thunai	Hiphop Tamizha	
2022	Ready Steady Go	Anbarivu	Hiphop Tamizha	
2022	Oorukaaran	Non-album singles	Hiphop Tamizha	
2024	Aeroplanil Yeri	Garudan	Yuvan Shankar Raja	
2024	Enna Kathai	Pudhu Wave	Yanchan Produced	
2026	"Kuru Kuru"	Carmeni Selvam	Musicloud Studio and Technologies	

==== Telugu songs ====
Year	Song	Film	Music director
2012	Pattuko Pattuko	Bus Stop	JB and G. Anil
2012	Kaatuka Kallu	Sarocharu	Devi Sri Prasad
2013	Mirchi	Mirchi	Devi Sri Prasad
2022	Ningi Nela	F3	Devi Sri Prasad

== Personal life ==
In 1990 Chinnaponnu was married to composer and percussionist Selva Kumar (who generally performs under the name Kumar) at Thanjavur Mariamman Temple. They have composed music and performed together ever since.

In 2008, Chinnaponnu was involved in a serious car accident, in which her driver was killed. She sustained head injuries and was hospitalised for several weeks, but was performing and recording again within a few months.

In 2021, Chinnaponnu participated in the reality show Bigg Boss Tamil Season 5 and became the only aged female contestant to survive in the house for 4 weeks.

In 2023, Chinnaponnnu is participating in Zee Tamil show Super Jodi.
