= Karunas =

Indian actor and comedian

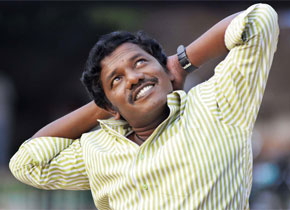
- Karunas

Vice president of Tamilan Artistes' Association
- Incumbent
- Assumed office 10 October 2015

Member of Tamil Nadu Legislative Assembly from Thiruvadanai constituency
- In office 19 May 2016 – 2 May 2021

President of Mukkulathor Pulipadai
- In office 2015–2019

Personal details
- Born: Karunanidhi Sethu Thevar; February 21, 1970 (age 56) Kuruvikkarambai, Thanjavur, Tamil Nadu, India
- Party: Mukkulathor Pulipadai
- Spouse: Grace Karunas
- Children: 2, including Ken
- Occupation: Actor, Comedian, Composer, Playback singer, Politician

Karunas (born as Karunanidhi Sethu Thevar; February 21, 1970) is an Indian actor, comedian, musician and politician in the Tamil film industry. Appearing mostly in supporting roles, he has also played main lead roles in films including Dindigul Sarathy (2008) and Ambasamudram Ambani (2008). Apart from acting, Karunas has also been credited in films as a producer, music composer and singer, while he continues to serve as the vice president of the Nadigar Sangam, a trade union for actors, after being elected in October 2015.

== Early life ==
Karunas was born on February 21, 1970, in Kuruvikkarambai, a village in Thanjavur, Tamil Nadu, India. He did his schooling at Palangudi Bharathi School and later studied at Nandanam Arts, Presidency College. Karunas began his career as pop singer and dancer, working extensively on Tamil folk music. He then gradually appeared in films as a comedian.

== Film career ==
Karunas began work as a folk singer aged 12, earning the moniker "Gaana" Karunas, and made his television debut through Yuhi Sethu's Naiyaandi Darbar show in the late 1990s as a musician. Director Bala heard one of his songs and subsequently signed Karunas on for an acting role in his second directorial venture, the drama film Nandhaa (2001). He was cast as the comedian and the film was successful, prompting him to accept further film offers. He subsequently went on to appear in notable films including Baba (2002), Pithamagan (2003), Vasool Raja MBBS (2004) and Polladhavan (2007) in supporting comedy roles. Karunas has also distributed two films, Pori (2007) and Kattradhu Thamizh (2007), both starring Jeeva in lead role, but the failure of both films has prompted him to stay away from distributing any further ventures.

Karunas first appeared in the lead role in the comedy drama, Dindigul Sarathy (2008), portraying an insecure man with an inferiority complex. With heavy promotions by Sun Pictures, the film became a surprise success at the box office and prompted Karunas to appear in further lead roles in the comedy films Ambasamudram Ambani (2010), Chandhamama (2013), Ragalaipuram (2013) and Lodukku Pandi (2015). In between the films, he also essayed serious performances, and was briefly involved in the making of Thanga Meengal (2013) before it underwent a change of cast, while he was successful for his role in Santosh Sivan's war drama film, Ceylon (2014). His films as the lead hero, gradually had lower key promotions than the previous ones, and in 2015, Karunas announced he would not appear in any further lead roles. He subsequently made a return to starring supporting roles thereafter, being successful for his performance of a suicidal man in Darling (2015) and as a villager in Komban (2015), which became his hundredth film. In Azhagu Kutti Chellam (2016), Karunas' performance was well received by critics. He has also continued to act in comedy films including Enakku Innoru Per Irukku and Dhilluku Dhuddu. Karunas played character roles in Soorarai Pottru (2020) and Pogumidam Vegu Thooramillai (2024).

== Political career ==
He was the leader of Mukkulathor Pulipadai, a Thevar political outfit. He contested from Tiruvadanai in the Tamil Nadu Legislative Assembly election 2016 with AIADMK's Two Leaves (Irratai Ilai) as his election symbol.

On 25 February 2017, an unidentified person threw footwear at Karunas' car while out to garland a statue of freedom fighter U. Muthuramalingam Thevar. It is believed that the incident could be connected to his support of AIADMK leader V. K. Sasikala.

== Personal life ==
Karunas is married to Grace, a playback singer in the Tamil film industry. The pair had met when Karunas was the guest judge at an inter-collegiate singing competition, and after being impressed, Karunas asked her to sing in his personal music album. The couple have a daughter Diana Karunas and a son, Ken Karunas.

Karunas's younger brother, Nagas, was set to making his acting debut through C. Ranganathan's Vantharu Jaicharu, but the film eventually did not release.

== Filmography ==
=== As an actor ===
Year	Film	Role	Notes
2001	Nandhaa	'Lodukku' Pandi	
2002	Pesadha Kannum Pesume	Arun	
2002	123	Aalavandhaan	
2002	Baba	Sambumani	
2002	Villain	Kodukan	
2002	Kadhal Azhivathillai	Samy	
2002	April Maadhathil	Jackson	
2002	Album	Paal Pandi	
2002	Jaya	Micheal	
2002	Bala	Kutty	
2003	Kadhaludan	Durai	
2003	Puthiya Geethai	Ganesh	
2003	Inidhu Inidhu Kadhal Inidhu		
2003	Aahaa Ethanai Azhagu	Shankar	
2003	Thiruda Thirudi	Rockfort Chandru	
2003	Success	Ganesh's friend	
2003	Kaiyodu Kai		
2003	Ragasiyamai	Suraa Sriganthan	
2003	Pithamagan	Karuvaayan	
2003	Thirumalai	Thirumalai's friend	
2003	Iyarkai	Nandu	
2003	Anbe Un Vasam	JK	
2003	Indru	Vishwanath	
2003	Sindhamal Sitharamal	Saravanan's friend	
2004	Ennavo Pudichirukku	Peela Magan	
2004	Pudhukottaiyilirundhu Saravanan	Vimal	
2004	Varnajaalam	Logu	
2004	Swetha Naagu	"Black" Baba	Telugu film; Dubbed in Tamil as Madhumathi
2004	Kuthu	Senthil	
2004	Jana	Tappa	
2004	New	Vichu (Ex)	
2004	Vasool Raja MBBS	Kalaialangaram	
2004	Attagasam	Pangu	
2005	Devathaiyai Kanden	'Kaduppu' Subramani	
2005	Arputha Theevu	Karuppiah	
2005	Kadhal Seiya Virumbu	Odibaba Ulaganathan	
2005	Kadhal FM	Chili Chicken	
2005	E	Tony	
2005	Adhu Oru Kana Kaalam		
2006	Sudesi	Ramesh	
2006	Mercury Pookkal	Karthik's friend	
2006	Prathi Gnayiru 9 Manimudhal 10.30 Varai	Romeo	
2006	Idhu Kadhal Varum Paruvam		
2006	Thiruvilaiyaadal Aarambam	Tiger Prathaphan	
2006	Thagappansaamy		
2007	Pori	Hari's friend	
2007	Ninaithu Ninaithu Parthen		
2007	Vedha		
2007	Arputha Theevu	Karuppiah	
2007	Mudhal Kanave		
2007	Nee Naan Nila	Mokkasamy	
2007	Maa Madurai	Arumugam	
2007	En Uyirinum Melana	Johnny	
2007	Tholaipesi		
2007	Puli Varudhu	Karuppa	
2007	Kattradhu Thamizh	Yuvaan-Suang	
2007	Chennai 600028	Himself	Guest appearance
2007	Polladhavan	Auto Kumar	
2008	Sadhu Miranda	Vellai	
2008	Vedha		
2008	Yaaradi Nee Mohini	Ganesh	
2008	Vallamai Tharayo	Master	
2008	Dhanam	Ananth's uncle	
2008	Netru Indru Naalai	Thamizh	
2008	Silambattam	Villager	
2008	Dindigul Sarathy	Sarathy	
2008	Thiruvannamalai	Duraisingam	
2008	Panchamirtham	Paandi	
2009	Satrumun Kidaitha Thagaval		
2009	Adada Enna Azhagu	Vasan's friend	
2009	Ayan	Dilli	
2009	Ilampuyal	Narayanan	
2009	Rajathi Raja	Krishnamoorthy	
2009	Maasilamani		
2009	Arumugam	Velu	
2009	Thamizhagam	Constable Vasool Raja	
2010	Rettaisuzhi	Army member	
2010	Ambasamudram Ambani	Thandapani	
2010	Pournami Nagam		
2010	Baana Kaathadi	Kumar	
2010	365 Kadhal Kadithangal	Murugan	
2010	Enthiran	Ravi	
2010	Uthama Puthiran	Janaki	
2011	Ilaignan	Subair	
2011	Kasethan Kadavulada	Karuna	
2011	Maharaja	Maadasamy	
2012	Kazhugu	Nandu	
2012	Aathi Narayana	Aslam Muhammed Rafiq Salam	
2012	Pandi Oliperukki Nilayam	Amarkalam	
2012	Ullam		direct-to-television
2013	Chandamama	Santhanakrishnan	Also producer
2013	Ragalaipuram	Velu	Also producer
2014	Ceylon	Stanley	
2015	Darling	Athisaya Raj	
2015	Komban	Muniyandi	
2015	Masss	Azhagu	
2015	Lodukku Pandi	Pandi	
2015	Savaale Samaali	Karunakaran	
2015	Puli	Sooran	
2015	Kathirvel Kaakha		
2016	Azhagu Kutti Chellam	Auto driver	
2016	Kathakali	Karpooram	
2016	Pugazh	Pugazh's brother	
2016	Jithan 2	Surya's known person	
2016	Enakku Innoru Per Irukku	Finger Babu	
2016	Dhilluku Dhuddu	Mohan	
2016	Ka Ka Ka Po		
2016	Thirunaal	Mani	
2016	Wagah	Nagappan	
2016	Kodi	Murugan	
2016	Pazhaya Vannarapettai		
2016	Achamindri	Pattu	
2017	Pandigai	Rattinam Kumar	
2020	Draupadi	Guruthevan	
2020	Soorarai Pottru	Alapparai	Tamil Nadu State Film Award for Best Character Artiste (Male)
2021	Sangathalaivan	Ranganathan	
2022	Viruman	Balu	
2022	Aadhaar	Pachamuthu	
2022	Gatta Kusthi	Ratnam	
2024	Rebel	College Professor	
2024	Pogumidam Vegu Thooramillai	Nalinamoorthy	Ananda Vikatan Cinema Award for Best Supporting Actor
2024	Kanguva	Selumaara	
2024	Sorgavaasal	Kattabomman	
2025	Madraskaaran	Chellapandi	
2025	Diesel	Vetti Sekar	
2026	Salliyargal		
2026	Kara	Kasi Maayan	
2026	Nooru Saami	Selvi's brother	
2026	Gatta Kusthi 2	Ratnam	
2026	Enna Vilai	Thavasi	
2026	Meesaya Murukku 2	Older Gaana Das	

=== As a distributor ===
- Thagapansamy (2006)
- Kattradhu Thamizh (2007)

=== As a lyricist ===
- Youth (2026)

== Discography ==
=== As a composer ===
Year	Film	Songs	Score	Notes
2009	Rajathi Raja	Yes	No	
2010	Ambasamudram Ambani	Yes	No	
2011	Kasethan Kadavulada	Yes	Yes	
2016	Pagiri	Yes	No	
2016	Kadavul Irukaan Kumaru	Yes	No	One song "Locality Boys" composed with Bobo Shashi

=== As a singer ===
Year	Title	Song	Composer	Notes
1987	Aisa Lakadi Mettu Thanunga (album)			Folk songs album
2002	Shree	"Madurai Jilla"	T. S. Muralidharan	
2003	Iyarkai	"Seetu Kattu"	Vidyasagar	Uncredited
2004	Kaadhal	"Pura Koondu"	Joshua Sridhar	
2005	Kadhal Seiya Virumbu	"Elam Elam"	G. Ram	
2005	Thunichal	"Katikalama"	Premji Amaren	
2006	Thalaimagan	"Uppumootai"	Paul J.	
2006	Prathi Gnayiru 9 Manimudhal 10.30 Varai	"Dhumkara"	John Peter	
2007	Chennai 600028	"Jalsa" (Remix)	Yuvan Shankar Raja	
2007	Puli Varudhu	"Kadhalikka Solludi"	Srikanth Deva	
2009	Rajathi Raja	"Kathirikka"	Himself	
2011	Kasethan Kadavulada	"Kasethan"	Himself	
2013	Chandhamama	"Koyambedu Silk Akka"	Srikanth Deva	Also lyrics
2013	Ceylon	"Londoniley"	Vishal Chandrashekhar	
2013	Ragalaipuram	"Obamavum Ingethan"	Srikanth Deva	
2015	Darling	"Vandha Mala"	G. V. Prakash Kumar	
2016	Kadavul Irukaan Kumaru	"Locality Boys"	himself, Bobo Shashi	also lyrics
2026	Youth	"Alapuzha Sandhayila"	himself, Gracy Karunas	also co-lyricist with Ken Karunas, Sibiraj Chakravarthi & Eshwar
