= K. R. Ramasamy (politician) =

Indian politician and social worker

Member of Tamil Nadu Legislative Assembly
- In office 19 May 2016 – 2 May 2021
- Preceded by: C. T. Palanichamy
- Succeeded by: S. Mangudi
- Constituency: Karaikudi
- In office 6 February 1989 – 13 May 2011
- Preceded by: K. Sornalingam
- Succeeded by: Suba. Thangavelan
- Constituency: Tiruvadanai

Personal details
- Born: October 9, 1953 (age 71)
- Political party: Indian National Congress
- Children: R. M. Karumanikam
- Parent: KR. RM. Kariya Manickam Ambalam

K. R. Ramasamy (born 9 October 1953) is an Indian politician, social worker from Tamil Nadu and former member of Tamil Nadu Legislative Assembly.

Ramasamy is the son of veteran Indian National Congress politician and former MLA, KR. RM. Kariya Manickam Ambalam, who was elected to the Tamil Nadu Legislative Assembly on four occasions from the Tiruvadanai constituency. Ramasamy junior has been elected to the same constituency on five consecutive occasions and, one time, from Karaikudi.

Ramasamy has contested elections as both an INC and Tamil Maanila Congress (Moopanar) (TMC) candidate. His successes have come in 1989, 1991, 1996, 2001, 2006, and 2016. The last of these was from Karaikudi, where he beat the Karpagam Ilango.
