= Chaya Singh =

Indian actress

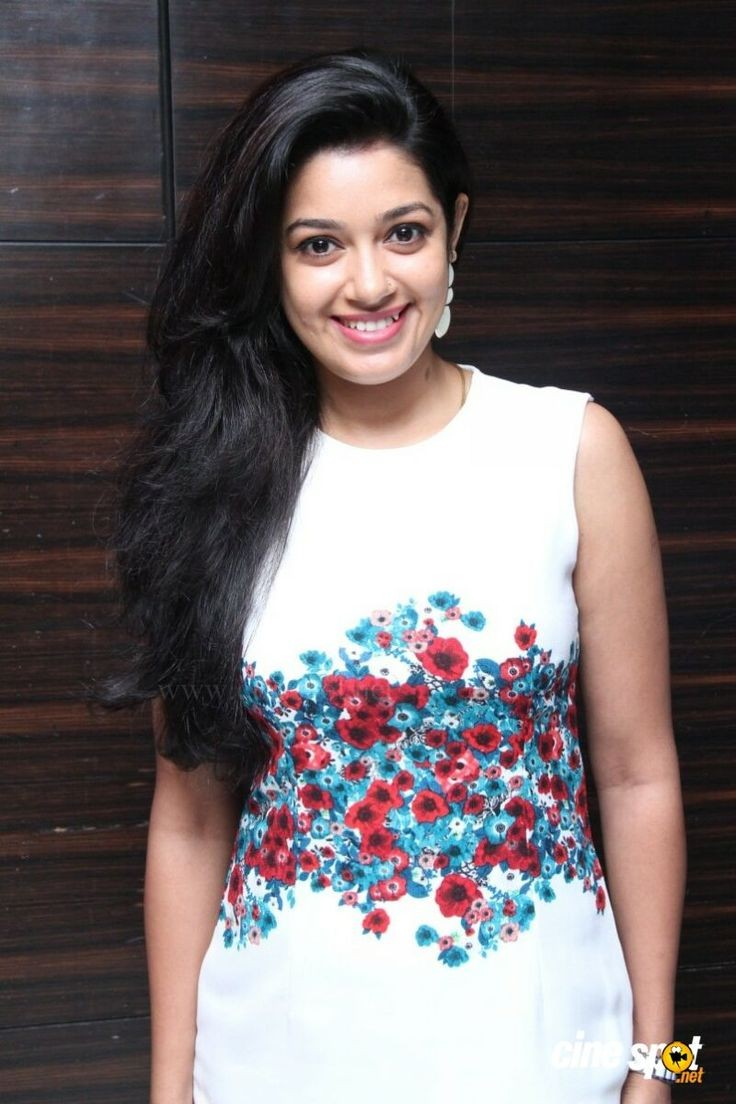
- Born: 16-05-1983; Bengaluru, Karnataka
- Other name: Chaya Krishna
- Occupation: Actress
- Years active: 2000-present
- Spouse: Krishna (m. 2012)

Chaya Singh is an Indian actress who predominantly works in Kannada films and television shows. She started her acting career in Kannada films and has worked in Tamil, Malayalam, Telugu, Bengali and Bhojpuri films. She has a reputation of being very selective in her roles. Chaya is well known of her role in Munnudi (2000).

== Early life ==
Singh belongs to a Rajput family. She grew up in Bangalore. She did her schooling at Lourdes School, Bangalore and studied for until twelfth there.

== Career ==
Her first film role was in Munnudi. She went to do more films in Kannada including Haseena which was directed by Girish Kasaravalli, Thuntata, which was a success, Dinesh Baboo's Chitte and Sai Prakash's Rowdy Aliya.

After Kannada industry, she did a few Tamil movies. Chaya Singh's popular movie in Tamil is Thiruda Thirudi. She also acted in its Kannada remake Sakha Sakhi.

She has performed in Akasha Gange in Kannada which released in 2008. About her performance in the film, Rediff wrote, "The highlight of the film is Chaya Singh who has come out with an outstanding performance as a music teacher who comes to her lover's house to win over his family". Sify wrote, "This is Chaya Singh's yet another best performance. She speaks from her lovely eyes". She acted in the Kannada short film Simply Kailawesome. The film made on playwright T. P. Kailasam revolves around conversations between Kailasam and female protagonists from four of his plays. Chaya Singh played all the four characters: Paatu from Tollugatti, Eeke from Gandaskathri, Venkamma from Home Rule and Sule from the play Sule.

She has acted in two Malayalam films, too, Mullavalliyum Thenmavum and Police, both directed by V. K. Prakash. In 2008 she was acting in two Bhojpuri films. Her first Bhojpuri release was Mahamaayi. She has directed a Bengali film, too.

She has done supporting roles in Kannada TV shows such as E-TV's Sarojini and Prema Kathegalu. She has acted in Tamil serial Nagamma, airing on Sun TV. She was a judge in the show Kuniyonu Bara on a Kannada television channel. Since 2012, she acts in Telugu serial "Kanchna Ganga", airing on Maa TV. She has been doing a few Tamil films in the last few years.

== Personal life ==
Chaya Singh's parents are Gopal Singh and Chamanlata. She married Tamil actor Krishna of Deivamagal fame, in June 2012.

== Filmography ==
Year	Film	Role	Language	Notes
2000	Munnudi	Unnisa	Kannada	
2001	Rashtrageethe	Chandini	Kannada	Special appearance
2001	Chitte	Shanthi	Kannada	
2002	Guttu	Shreya	Kannada	
2002	Thuntata	Priya	Kannada	
2002	Balagalittu Olage Baa	Gowri	Kannada	
2003	Preetisle Beku	Vijayalakshmi (Viji)	Kannada	
2003	Thiruda Thirudi	Vijayalakshmi (Viji)	Tamil	
2003	Mullavalliyum Thenmavum	Rajasree	Malayalam	
2004	Kavithai	Subulakshmi	Tamil	
2004	Rowdy Aliya	Kuppamma	Kannada	
2004	Arul	Ponni	Tamil	Special Appearance in "Marudha Malai Adivaaram" Song
2004	Amma Appa Chellam	Nandhitha	Tamil	
2004	Jaisurya	Charupriya	Tamil	
2005	Thirupaachi	Herself	Tamil	Special Appearance in "Kumbudu Pona Deivam" Song
2005	Sakha Sakhi	Viji	Kannada	
2005	Police	Keerthi	Malayalam	
2005	No	Priya	Telugu	
2008	Vallamai Tharayo	Nanditha	Tamil	
2008	Akasha Gange	Beena / Lakshmi	Kannada	
2010	Anandhapurathu Veedu	Revathy Bala	Tamil	
2010	Simply Kailawesome	Paatu / Eeke / Venkamma / Sule	Kannada	Short film
2012	Ki Kore Bojhabo Tomake	Sapna	Bengali	Also director
2014	Idhu Kathirvelan Kadhal	Vineethra	Tamil	
2016	Uyire Uyire	Divya	Tamil	
2017	Power Paandi	Premalatha	Tamil	
2017	Mufti	Vedhavathi	Kannada	
2017	Ulkuthu	Raja's sister	Tamil	
2018	Iravukku Aayiram Kangal	Roopala	Tamil	
2018	Pattinapakkam	Sheeba	Tamil	
2019	Action	Kayalvizhi	Tamil	
2020	Khaki	Chaya	Kannada	
2022	Lilly Rani	Rani	Tamil	
2023	Tamilarasan	Doctor	Tamil	
2024	Bhairathi Ranagal	Vedhavathi	Kannada	
2025	Royal	Seetha	Kannada	

== Television ==
Year	Title	Role	Channel	Language
	Sarojini	Sarojini	Zee Kannada	Kannada
	Prema Kathegalu		Colors Kannada	Kannada
2011–2012	Nagamma	Nagamma	Sun TV	Tamil
2012	Kuniyonu Baara	Judge	Zee Kannada	Kannada
2012	Haalu Jenu Naanu Neenu	Host	Zee Kannada	Kannada
2012–2014	Kanchana Ganga		Maa TV	Telugu
2019–2020	Run	Divya	Sun TV	Tamil
2019–2020	Nandini	Nandini / Janani	Udaya TV	Kannada
2021–2022	Poove Unakkaga	Ranjana	Sun TV	Tamil
2021	Poova Thalaya	Guest	Sun TV	Tamil
2021	Vanakkam Tamizha	Herself	Sun TV	Tamil
2022	Namma Madurai Sisters	Indhrani	Colors Tamil	Tamil
2022	Vanakkam Tamizha	Herself	Sun TV	Tamil
2023–2024	Anu Ane Nenu	Akshara	Gemini TV	Telugu
2023–present	Amruthadhare	Bhoomika	Zee Kannada	Kannada
2025–2026	Gettimelam	Thulasi	Zee Tamil	Tamil
2026	Jodi Number 1	Judge	Zee Kannada	Kannada
