= Ishta =

Ishta may refer to:

- Ishta (film), a 2011 Kannada-language film
- Ishta (Stargate), a character in Stargate SG-1
- Iṣṭa-devatā (Hinduism), a term denoting a worshipper's favourite deity
- Emma Ishta (born 1990), Australian model and actress
