= List of songs recorded by Shankar Mahadevan =

Shankar Mahadevan (3 March 1967) is an Indian playback singer and music composer. Best known for his work in Hindi, Tamil, Telugu, Kannada, Malayalam and Marathi films. He has also recorded songs for many non-film albums, teliseries, devotionals and classical.

Shankar shot to fame through his 1998 released private album Breathless . In Tamil, Telugu, Malayalam and Kannada films, he initially rose to fame through A. R. Rahman compositions and eventually recorded many hundreds of songs for composers.

This is only a partial list; Shankar has sung over 7000 songs.

== Hindi film songs ==
=== 1990s ===
Year	Film	Song	Composer(s)	Writer(s)	Co-artist(s)
1993	In Custody	"Naseeb Aazmane Ke"	Zakir Hussain		
1994	Aladdin (D)	"Arabian Nights"(Hindi)	Alan Menken		
1994	Humse Hai Muqabala (D)	"Patti Rap"	A. R. Rahman	P.K.Misra	Suresh Peters, Noel James
1994	Humse Hai Muqabala (D)	"Urvashi Urvashi"	A. R. Rahman	P.K.Misra	A. R. Rahman, Noel James
1995	Akele Hum Akele Tum	"Aisa Zakham"	Anu Malik		
1995	Oh Darling! Yeh Hai India!	"Par Mila"	Ranjit Barot		
1995	Oh Darling! Yeh Hai India!	"Khullam Khulla"	Ranjit Barot		
1995	Oh Darling! Yeh Hai India!	"Choo Le Ne De"	Ranjit Barot		
1995	Oh Darling! Yeh Hai India!	"Oh Darling Yeh Hai"	Ranjit Barot		
1995	Oh Darling! Yeh Hai India!	"Public Ko Hasao"	Ranjit Barot		
1995	Oh Darling! Yeh Hai India!	"Baap Re Baap"	Ranjit Barot		
1996	Daanveer	"Hum Tumko"	Anand–Milind		
1996	Daraar	"Main Hi Main"	Anu Malik		
1996	Ghatak: Lethal	"Koi Jaye To Le Aaye"	Anu Malik		
1996	Loafer	"Tere Dil Ne"	Anand–Milind		
1996	Muqadar	"Ke Ke Chemistry"	Anand–Milind		
1996	Yash	"Subah Subah Jab"	Tabun Sutradar		
1997	Aar Ya Paar	"Tamma Ele Tamma Ele"	Viju Shah		
1997	Auzaar	"I Love You I Love You"	Anu Malik		
1997	Border	"Hindustan Hindustan"	Anu Malik		
1997	Dus	"Hindustani"	Shankar–Ehsaan–Loy		
1997	Dus	"Mahiya"	Shankar–Ehsaan–Loy		
1997	Dus	"Chandni Roop Ki"	Shankar–Ehsaan–Loy		
1997	Dus	"Sur Mile Hai"	Shankar–Ehsaan–Loy		
1997	Himalay Putra	"Bam Bam Bhole"	Anu Malik		
1997	Itihaas	"Ja Re Ja Ud Ja Panchhi"	Dilip Sen – Sameer Sen		
1997	Itihaas	"Pyar Ka Dushman"	Dilip Sen – Sameer Sen		
1997	Judaai	"Meri Zindagi"	Nadeem–Shravan		
1997	Judaai	"Shaadi Karke"	Nadeem–Shravan		
1997	Pardes	"Yeh Dil Deewana"	Nadeem–Shravan	Anand Bakshi	Sonu Nigam, Hema Sardesai, Ehsaan Noorani
1997	Pardes	"I Love My India"	Nadeem–Shravan	Anand Bakshi	Kavita Krishnamurthy, Hariharan, Aditya Narayan
1997	Pardes	"Jahan Piya Wahan"	Nadeem–Shravan	Anand Bakshi	K. S. Chithra
1997	Pardes	"Title Music"	Nadeem–Shravan	Anand Bakshi	Sapna Awasthi
1997	Sapnay (D)	"Ek Bagiya"	A. R. Rahman	Javed Akhtar	
1998	Chhota Chetan (D)	"Ek Jaadu Hone Wala Hai"	Anu Malik	Javed Akhtar	
1998	Chhota Chetan (D)	"Ringa Ringa Roses"	Anu Malik	Javed Akhtar	
1998	Duplicate	"Tum Nahi Jaana"	Anu Malik	Javed Akhtar	
1998	Dushman	"Hippy Hippy Ya"	Uttam Singh	Anand Bakshi	Asha Bhosle
1998	Dushman	"Tunna Tunna"	Uttam Singh	Anand Bakshi	
1998	Gharwali Baharwali	"Ghunghat Mein Chehra"	Anu Malik	Dev Kohli	
1998	Kuch Kuch Hota Hai	"Raghupati Raghav"	Jatin–Lalit	Sameer	
1998	Maharaja	"Mera Pyara Mukhda"	Nadeem Shravan	Sameer	
1998	Prem Aggan	"Har Dam Dam Bedam"	Anu Malik	M. G. Hashmat	
1998	Zor	"Tere Pyar Mein"	Agosh	Anand Bakshi	
1998	China Gate	"Chamma Chamma"	Anu Malik	Sameer	
1999	Arjun Pandit	"Kahan Jaye Koi"	Dilip Sen – Sameer Sen	Javed Akhtar	
1999	Bade Dilwala	"Mera Pyara Mukhda"	Aadesh Shrivastava	Sameer	
1999	Bade Dilwala	"Baant Rahaa Tha"	Aadesh Shrivastava	Sameer	
1999	Biwi No.1	"Ishq Sona Hai"	Anu Malik	Sameer	
1999	Chehraa	"Dil Bhi Bhara Nahin"	Anu Malik	Sameer	
1999	Dillagi	"Dillagi Dillagi"	Shankar–Ehsaan–Loy	Javed Akhtar	
1999	Dillagi	"Kya Yeh Sach Hai"	Shankar–Ehsaan–Loy	Javed Akhtar	
1999	Dillagi	"Rahon Mei Chhayee"	Shankar–Ehsaan–Loy	Javed Akhtar	
1999	Dillagi	"Dhoom Dhoom Luck Luck"	Sukhwinder Singh	Javed Akhtar	
1999	Dulhan Banoo Main Teri	"Woh Roi Hogi"	Raam Laxman	Sameer	
1999	Haseena Maan Jaayegi	"Haseena Maan Jaayegi"	Anu Malik	Sameer	
1999	Haseena Maan Jaayegi	"Cheenti Pahad Chadhe"	Anu Malik	Hema Sardesai, Ehsaan Noorani	
1999	Hum Aapke Dil Mein Rehte Hain	"Patni Pati Ke Liye"	Anu Malik	Sameer	
1999	Hum Aapke Dil Mein Rehte Hain	"Papa Main Papa Bangaya"	Anu Malik	Sameer	
1999	Hum Dil De Chuke Sanam	"Man Mohini"	Ismail Darbar	Mehboob	
1999	Hum Dil De Chuke Sanam	"Love Theme"	Ismail Darbar	Mehboob	Kavita Krishnamurthy
1999	Hum Dil De Chuke Sanam	"Albela Sajan"	Ismail Darbar	Mehboob	Sultan Khan, Kavita Krishnamurthy
1999	Hum Dil De Chuke Sanam	"Kai Poche"	Ismail Darbar	Mehboob	Damayanti Bardai, Jyotsna Hardikar, K.K
1999	Hum Saath Saath Hain	"A B C D"	Raam Laxman	Sameer	
1999	Kohram	"Pagal Huwa Huwa Huwa"	Dilip Sen – Sameer Sen	Sameer	
1999	Laawaris	"Kuchh Hamare"	Rajesh Roshan	Sameer	
1999	Manchala	"Oh America"	Raamlaxman		
1999	Rockford	"Aasman Ke Paar"	Shankar–Ehsaan–Loy		
1999	Shool	"Shool"	Shankar–Ehsaan–Loy	Anand Bakshi	
1999	Shool	"Aaya Mere Papa"	Shankar–Ehsaan–Loy	Anand Bakshi	
1999	Shool	"Mai Aayi Hoon UP Bihar Lootne"	Shankar–Ehsaan–Loy	Anand Bakshi	
1999	Thakshak	"Jumbalika Jumbalika"	A. R. Rahman	Mehboob	
1999	Vaastav: The Reality	"Apne Maa Hai Duniya"	Jatin–Lalit	Sameer	

=== 2000s ===
Year	Film	Song	Composer(s)	Writer(s)	Co-artist(s)
2000	Astitva	"Gaana Mere Bas Ki"	Sukhwinder Singh		Sadhana Sargam
2000	Astitva	"Gaana Mere Bas Ki – 2"	Sukhwinder Singh		Sadhana Sargam
2000	Bichhoo	"Pyar Ho Na Jaaye"	Anand Raj Anand	Sameer	
2000	Chal Mere Bhai	"Chal Mere Bhai (remix)"	Anand–Milind	Sameer	
2000	Dulhan Hum Le Jayenge	"Mujhse Shaadi Karogi"	Himesh Reshammiya	Sudhakar Sharma	
2000	Gaja Gamini	"Deepak Raag"	Bhupen Hazarika	Maya Govind	
2000	Khauff	"Saiyyan More Saiyyan"	Anu Malik	Rani Malik	
2000	Mela	"Mela Dilon Ka (celebration)"	Anu Malik	Dev Kohli	
2000	Mission Kashmir	"Rind Posh Mal"	Shankar-Ehsan-Loy	Javed Akhtar	
2000	Mission Kashmir	"Bhumbro Bhumbro"	Shankar-Ehsan-Loy	Javed Akhtar	
2000	Mission Kashmir	"Socho Ke Jhelon Ka"	Shankar-Ehsan-Loy	Javed Akhtar	
2000	Mission Kashmir	"Dhuan Dhuan"	Shankar-Ehsan-Loy	Javed Akhtar	
2000	Phir Bhi Dil Hai Hindustani	"Vande Mataram"	Jatin–Lalit	Javed Akhtar	
2000	Pukar	"Kay Sera Sera"	A. R. Rahman	Javed Akhtar	
2000	Raju Chacha	"Ek Sher Tha Ek Sherni"	Jatin–Lalit	Anand Bakshi	
2000	Refugee	"Jise Tu Na Mila"	Anu Malik	Javed Akhtar	
2000	Tera Jadoo Chal Gayaa	"Jo Ishq Ka Matlab"	Ismail Darbar	Sameer	
2001	Abhay	"Aa Hi Gaya Dekho Abhay"	Shankar–Ehsaan–Loy	Javed Akhtar	
2001	Abhay	"Hans De"	Shankar–Ehsaan–Loy	Javed Akhtar	
2001	Abhay	"Koyal Se Mili"	Shankar–Ehsaan–Loy	Javed Akhtar	
2001	Dil Chahta Hai	"Dil Chahta Hai"	Shankar–Ehsaan–Loy	Javed Akhtar	
2001	Dil Chahta Hai	"Koi Kahe Kehta Rahe"	Shankar–Ehsaan–Loy	Javed Akhtar	
2001	Dil Chahta Hai	"Dil Chahta Hai"(reprise)	Shankar–Ehsaan–Loy	Javed Akhtar	
2001	Ehsaas: The Feeling	"Zindagi Ek Daud Hain"	Anand Raj Anand	Sameer	
2001	Lagaan	"Ghanan Ghanan"	A. R. Rahman	Javed Akhtar	
2001	Nayak	"Rukhi Sukhi Roti"	A. R. Rahman	Anand Bakshi	
2002	Maa Tujhhe Salaam	"Maa Tujhe Salaam"	Sajid–Wajid	Javed Akhtar	
2002	Maseeha	"Panga Naa Le"	Anand Raj Anand	Dev Kohli	
2002	Pyar Ki Dhun	"Yeh Saare Din"	Shantanu Moitra	Javed Akhtar	
2002	Yeh Kya Ho Raha Hai?	"Aarzoo"	Shankar–Ehsaan–Loy	Javed Akhtar	
2002	Yeh Kya Ho Raha Hai?	"Yaar Apne Ghar Jao"	Shankar–Ehsaan–Loy	Javed Akhtar	
2002	Yeh Kya Ho Raha Hai?	"Ye Kya Ho Raha Hai"	Shankar–Ehsaan–Loy	Javed Akhtar	
2002	Yeh Kya Ho Raha Hai?	"Ye Kya Ho Raha Hai – 2"	Shankar–Ehsaan–Loy	Javed Akhtar	
2003	Armaan	"Aao Milke Gaayen"	Shankar–Ehsaan–Loy	Javed Akhtar	
2003	Armaan	"Jaane Ye Kya Ho Gaya"	Shankar–Ehsaan–Loy	Javed Akhtar	
2003	Ek Aur Ek Gyarah	"Ek Aur Ek Gyarah"	Shankar–Ehsaan–Loy	Sameer	
2003	Ek Aur Ek Gyarah	"Beimaann Mohabbat"	Shankar–Ehsaan–Loy	Sameer	
2003	Ek Aur Ek Gyarah	"Main Jogiya"	Shankar–Ehsaan–Loy	Sameer	
2003	Kal Ho Naa Ho	"Pretty Woman"	Shankar–Ehsaan–Loy	Javed Akhtar	
2003	Kal Ho Naa Ho	"Maahi Ve"	Shankar–Ehsaan–Loy	Javed Akhtar	
2003	Kuch Naa Kaho	"Tumhe Aaj Maine Jo Dekha"	Shankar–Ehsaan–Loy	Javed Akhtar	
2003	Kuch Naa Kaho	"Baat Mere Suniye"	Shankar–Ehsaan–Loy	Javed Akhtar	
2003	Kuch Naa Kaho	"Kehti Hai Ye Hawa"	Shankar–Ehsaan–Loy	Javed Akhtar	
2003	Nayee Padosan	"Chori Nahi Kee"	Shankar–Ehsaan–Loy	Sameer	
2003	Nayee Padosan	"Dil Mein Dhadkano Mein"	Shankar–Ehsaan–Loy	Sameer	
2003	Stumped	"Humko Toh Hai Poora Yakeen"	Pritam	Abbas Tyrewala	
2004	Armaan	"Aao Milke Gaayen"	Shankar–Ehsaan–Loy	Javed Akhtar	
2004	Armaan	"Jaane Ye Kya Ho Gaya"	Shankar–Ehsaan–Loy	Javed Akhtar	
2004	Kyun! Ho Gaya Na...	"Pyar Mein Sau Uljhane Hai"	Shankar–Ehsaan–Loy	Javed Akhtar	Mahalaxmi Iyer, Sneha Pant, Vijay Prakash
2004	Kyun! Ho Gaya Na...	"No No!"	Shankar–Ehsaan–Loy	Javed Akhtar	Chetan Shashital, Dominique Cerejo, Kunal Ganjawala, Loy Mendonsa
2004	Kyun! Ho Gaya Na...	"Baat Samjha Karo"	Shankar–Ehsaan–Loy	Javed Akhtar	Javed Ali, Chetan Shashital
2004	Kyun! Ho Gaya Na...	"Dheere Dheere"	Shankar–Ehsaan–Loy	Javed Akhtar	
2004	Lakshya	"Lakshya"	Shankar–Ehsaan–Loy	Javed Akhtar	
2004	Paisa Vasool	"Rukte Chalte"	Bapi-Tutul	Sameer	
2004	Phir Milenge	"Jeene Ke Ishare"	Shankar–Ehsaan–Loy	Prasoon Joshi	
2004	Rudraksh	"Ishq Khudai"	Shankar–Ehsaan–Loy	Javed Akhtar	
2004	Rudraksh	"Rak Rak Rak"	Shankar–Ehsaan–Loy	Javed Akhtar	
2004	Rudraksh	"Ishq Khudai – remix"	Shankar–Ehsaan–Loy	Javed Akhtar	
2004	Rudraksh	"Kya Dard Hai"	Shankar–Ehsaan–Loy	Javed Akhtar	
2005	Bunty Aur Babli	"B N B"	Shankar–Ehsaan–Loy	Blaaze	
2005	Bunty Aur Babli	"Bunty Aur Babli"	Shankar–Ehsaan–Loy	Gulzar	
2005	Bunty Aur Babli	"Kajra Re"	Shankar–Ehsaan–Loy	Gulzar	
2005	Bunty Aur Babli	"Nach Baliye"	Shankar–Ehsaan–Loy	Gulzar	
2005	Chehraa	"Usko Jaane Na Do"	Anu Malik	Javed Akhtar	
2005	Dil Jo Bhi Kahey...	"Kaun Jaane"	Shankar–Ehsaan–Loy	Sameer	
2005	Dil Jo Bhi Kahey...	"Mere Munna"	Shankar–Ehsaan–Loy	Sameer	
2005	Dil Jo Bhi Kahey...	"Tu Nahi Thi"	Shankar–Ehsaan–Loy	Sameer	
2005	Kaal	"Dharma Mix"	Salim–Sulaiman	Shabbir Ahmed	
2005	Viruddh... Family Comes First	"Shree Ganeshay Dheemahi"	Ajay–Atul		
2006	Don	"Mourya Re"	Shankar–Ehsaan–Loy	Javed Akhtar	
2006	Kabhi Alvida Naa Kehna	"Mitwa"	Shankar–Ehsaan–Loy	Javed Akhtar	
2006	Kabhi Alvida Naa Kehna	"Rock N Roll Soniye"	Shankar–Ehsaan–Loy	Javed Akhtar	
2006	Kabhi Alvida Naa Kehna	"Mitwa (revisited)"	Shankar–Ehsaan–Loy	Javed Akhtar	
2007	Heyy Babyy	"Mast Kalandar"	Shankar–Ehsaan–Loy	Sameer	Rehan Khan, Master Saleem, Sajid Khan
2007	Heyy Babyy	"Jaane Bhi De"	Shankar–Ehsaan–Loy	Sameer	
2007	Heyy Babyy	"Jaane Bhi De"(Hiccup remix)	Shankar–Ehsaan–Loy	Sameer	
2007	Honeymoon Travels Pvt. Ltd.	"Albela"	Vishal–Shekhar	Javed Akhtar	
2007	Jhoom Barabar Jhoom	"Jhoom"	Shankar–Ehsaan–Loy	Sameer	
2007	Jhoom Barabar Jhoom	"JBJ"	Shankar–Ehsaan–Loy	Sameer	
2007	Jhoom Barabar Jhoom	"Jhoom Barabar Jhoom"	Shankar–Ehsaan–Loy		
2007	Johnny Gaddaar	"Move Your Body"	Shankar–Ehsaan–Loy	Jaideep Sahni	
2007	Johnny Gaddaar	"Dhoka"	Shankar–Ehsaan–Loy	Jaideep Sahni	
2007	Johnny Gaddaar	"Move Your Body (Phatt Mix)"	Shankar–Ehsaan–Loy	Jaideep Sahni	
2007	Salaam-e-Ishq: A Tribute To Love	"Saiyyaan Re"	Shankar–Ehsaan–Loy	Sameer	
2007	Taare Zameen Par	"Taare Zameen Par"	Shankar–Ehsaan–Loy	Prasoon Joshi	
2007	Taare Zameen Par	"Maa"	Shankar–Ehsaan–Loy	Prasoon Joshi	
2007	Welcome	"Honth Rasiley"	Anand Raj Anand	Anand Raj Anand	
2008	Thoda Pyaar Thoda Magic	"Pyaar Ke Liye"	Shankar–Ehsaan–Loy	Prasoon Joshi	
2008	Thoda Pyaar Thoda Magic	"Nihaal Ho Gayi"	Shankar–Ehsaan–Loy	Prasoon Joshi	
2008	Thoda Pyaar Thoda Magic	"Bulbula"	Shankar–Ehsaan–Loy	Prasoon Joshi	
2008	Thoda Pyaar Thoda Magic	"Nihaal Ho Gayi (remix)"	Shankar–Ehsaan–Loy	Prasoon Joshi	
2008	Mehbooba	"Kuch Kar Lo"	Ismail Darbar	Anand Bakshi	
2008	Bachna Ae Haseeno	"Small Town Girl"	Vishal–Shekhar	Anvita Dutt Guptan	
2008	God Tussi Great Ho	"God Tussi Great Ho"	Sajid–Wajid	Shabbir Ahmed	
2008	Dostana	"Desi Girl"	Vishal–Shekhar	Kumaar	Sunidhi Chauhan, Vishal Dadlani
2009	Chandni Chowk to China	"Tere Naina"	Shankar–Ehsaan–Loy	Rajat Arora	Shreya Ghoshal
2009	Chandni Chowk to China	"Chandni Chowk to China"	Shankar–Ehsaan–Loy	Rajat Arora	Neeraj Shridhar, Anushka Manchanda
2009	Luck by Chance	"Baawre"	Shankar–Ehsaan–Loy	Prasoon Joshi	
2009	Luck by Chance	"Sapnon Se Bhare Naina"	Shankar–Ehsaan–Loy	Prasoon Joshi	
2009	Luck by Chance	"O Rahi Re"	Shankar–Ehsaan–Loy	Prasoon Joshi	
2009	Luck by Chance	"Baawre (remix)"	Shankar–Ehsaan–Loy	Prasoon Joshi	
2009	13B	"Sab Khairiyat Hai"	Shankar–Ehsaan–Loy	Neelesh Mishra	
2009	13B	"Aasamaan Odh Kar"	Shankar–Ehsaan–Loy	Neelesh Mishra	
2009	13B	"Bade Se Shehar Mein"	Shankar–Ehsaan–Loy	Neelesh Mishra	
2009	13B	"Sab Khairiyat Hai (remix)"	Shankar–Ehsaan–Loy	Neelesh Mishra	
2009	13B	"Aasamaan Odh Kar (remix)"	Shankar–Ehsaan–Loy	Neelesh Mishra	
2009	Sikandar	"Dhoop Ke Sikke"	Shankar–Ehsaan–Loy	Kumaar	
2009	Shortkut	"Mareeze Mohabbat"	Shankar–Ehsaan–Loy	Javed Akhtar	
2009	Shortkut	"Patli Galli"	Shankar–Ehsaan–Loy	Javed Akhtar	
2009	Shortkut	"Patli Galli – 2"	Shankar–Ehsaan–Loy	Javed Akhtar	
2009	Shortkut	"Mareeze Mohabbat (remix)"	Shankar–Ehsaan–Loy	Javed Akhtar	
2009	Shortkut	"Patli Galli (remix)"	Shankar–Ehsaan–Loy	Javed Akhtar	
2009	Wake Up Sid	"Wake Up Sid!"	Shankar–Ehsaan–Loy	Javed Akhtar	
2009	Wake Up Sid	"Aaj Kal Zindagi"	Shankar–Ehsaan–Loy	Javed Akhtar	
2009	Wake Up Sid	"Wake Up Sid! (club mix)"	Shankar–Ehsaan–Loy	Javed Akhtar	
2009	London Dreams	"Man Ko Ati Bhavey"	Shankar–Ehsaan–Loy	Prasoon Joshi	
2009	London Dreams	"Khwab"	Shankar–Ehsaan–Loy	Prasoon Joshi	
2009	London Dreams	"Man Ko Ati Bhavey (remix)"	Shankar–Ehsaan–Loy	Prasoon Joshi	
2009	Aladin	"Tak Dhina Din"	Vishal–Shekhar	Vishal Dadlani	
2009	Aladin	"Bachke O Bachke"	Vishal–Shekhar	Anvita Dutt Guptan	

=== 2010s ===
Year	Film	Song	Composer(s)	Writer(s)	Co-artist(s)
2010	My Name is Khan	"Sajda"	Shankar–Ehsaan–Loy	Javed Akhtar	Rahat Fateh Ali Khan, Richa Sharma
2010	My Name is Khan	"Noor-E-Khuda"	Shankar–Ehsaan–Loy	Javed Akhtar	Adnan Sami, Shreya Ghoshal
2010	My Name is Khan	"Rang De"	Shankar–Ehsaan–Loy	Javed Akhtar	Suraj Jagan
2010	Karthik Calling Karthik	"Hey Ya!"	Shankar–Ehsaan–Loy	Javed Akhtar	Clinton Cerejo, Loy Mendonsa
2010	Karthik Calling Karthik	"Uff Teri Adaa"	Shankar–Ehsaan–Loy	Javed Akhtar	Alyssa Mendonsa
2010	Karthik Calling Karthik	"Karthik Calling Karthik (remix)"	Shankar–Ehsaan–Loy	Javed Akhtar	
2010	Karthik Calling Karthik	"Hey Ya! (remix)"	Shankar–Ehsaan–Loy	Javed Akhtar	
2010	Karthik Calling Karthik	"Uff Teri Adaa (remix)"	Shankar–Ehsaan–Loy	Javed Akhtar	
2010	Lahore	"Rang De"	M. M. Kreem	Prasoon Joshi	
2010	Hum Tum Aur Ghost	"Kal Tum The Yahan"	Shankar–Ehsaan–Loy	Javed Akhtar	
2010	Hum Tum Aur Ghost	"Hum Tum Aur Ghost"	Shankar–Ehsaan–Loy	Javed Akhtar	
2010	Hum Tum Aur Ghost	"Kal Tum The Yahan (remix)"	Shankar–Ehsaan–Loy	Javed Akhtar	
2010	Raajneeti	"Dhan Dhan Dharti"	Pritam	Gulzar	Wayne Sharpe
2010	Tere Bin Laden	"Ullu Da Pattha"	Shankar–Ehsaan–Loy	Gulzar	
2010	Aashayein	"Pal Main Mila Jahan"	Pritam	Mir Ali Husain	
2010	We Are Family	"Reham O Karam"	Shankar–Ehsaan–Loy	Irshad Kamil	
2010	Do Dooni Chaar	"Do Dooni Chaar"	Meet Bros Anjjan	Meet Bros Anjjan	
2010	Do Dooni Chaar	"Do Dooni Chaar Jam"	Meet Bros Anjjan	Meet Bros Anjjan	
2010	Do Dooni Chaar	"Do Dooni Chaar club mix"	Meet Bros Anjjan	Meet Bros Anjjan	
2010	Guzaarish	"Dhundli Dhundli"	Sanjay Leela Bhansali	A. M. Turaz	
2010	Mirch	"Kaare Kaare Badra"	Monty Sharma	Javed Akhtar	
2011	Patiala House	"Rola Pe Gaya"	Shankar–Ehsaan–Loy	Anvita Dutt Guptan	
2011	Patiala House	"Rola Pe Gaya (remix)"	Shankar–Ehsaan–Loy	Anvita Dutt Guptan	
2011	Zokkomon	"Zokkomon"	Shankar–Ehsaan–Loy	Javed Akhtar	
2011	Zokkomon	"Zokkomon – I"	Shankar–Ehsaan–Loy	Javed Akhtar	
2011	Stanley Ka Dabba	"Nanhi Si Jaan"	Hitesh Sonik	Amole Gupte	
2011	Zindagi Na Milegi Dobara	"Ik Junoon"	Shankar–Ehsaan–Loy	Javed Akhtar	Vishal Dadlani, Ehsaan Noorani, Alyssa Mendonsa, Gulraj Singh
2011	Zindagi Na Milegi Dobara	"Ik Junoon – Remix"	Shankar–Ehsaan–Loy	Javed Akhtar	Vishal Dadlani, Ehsaan Noorani, Alyssa Mendonsa, Gulraj Singh
2011	Zindagi Na Milegi Dobara	"Der Lagi Lekin"	Shankar–Ehsaan–Loy	Javed Akhtar	
2011	Aarakshan	"Roshanee"	Shankar–Ehsaan–Loy	Prasoon Joshi	
2011	Chargesheet	"Mera Ishq Bhi Tu"	Raja Kashif	Neeraj	
2011	Don 2	"Dushman Mera"	Shankar–Ehsaan–Loy	Javed Akhtar	
2011	Masti Express	Manzilon Ke Liye"	Chinar–Mahesh		
2012	Arjun: The Warrior Prince	"Daanav"	Vishal–Shekhar	Vishal Dadlani	
2012	Chittagong	"Bolo Na"	Shankar–Ehsaan–Loy	Prasoon Joshi	
2012	Chittagong	"Bechayan Sapne"	Shankar–Ehsaan–Loy	Prasoon Joshi	
2012	Delhi Safari	"Dil Ki Safari"	Shankar–Ehsaan–Loy	Sameer	
2012	Delhi Safari	"Dhadak Dhadak"	Shankar–Ehsaan–Loy	Sameer	
2012	Delhi Safari	"Jungle Main Mangal"	Shankar–Ehsaan–Loy	Sameer	
2013	Matru Ki Bijlee Ka Mandola	"Oye Boy Charlie"	Vishal Bhardwaj	Gulzar	Mohit Chauhan, Rekha Bhardwaj, Vishal Bhardwaj
2013	Main Krishna Hoon	"Hare Rama Hare Krishna"	Amjad – Nadeem	Nadeem	
2013	Vishwaroop	"Jung Hai"	Shankar–Ehsaan–Loy	Javed Akhtar	
2013	Vishwaroop	"Main Radha Tu Shaam"	Shankar–Ehsaan–Loy	Javed Akhtar	
2013	Yamla Pagla Deewana 2	"Yamla Pagla Deewana"	Shaarib-Toshi	Kumaar	
2013	Yamla Pagla Deewana 2	"YPD2 – Mash up"	Shaarib-Toshi	Kumaar	
2013	Bhaag Milkha Bhaag	"Slow Motion Angreza"	Shankar–Ehsaan–Loy	Prasoon Joshi	
2013	D-Day	"Murshid Khele Holi"	Shankar–Ehsaan–Loy	Niranjan Iyengar	
2013	Gori Tere Pyaar Mein	"Chingam Chabake"	Vishal–Shekhar	Kumaar	Shalmali Kholgade
2013	Gori Tere Pyaar Mein	"Chingam Chabake (remix)"	Vishal–Shekhar	Kumaar	Shalmali Kholgade
2013	Gori Tere Pyaar Mein	"Gori Tere Pyaar Mein"	Vishal–Shekhar	Kumaar	
2014	One by Two	"Khushfehmiyan"	Shankar–Ehsaan–Loy	Amitabh Bhattacharya	
2014	One by Two	"Khushfehmiyan (unplugged)"	Shankar–Ehsaan–Loy	Amitabh Bhattacharya	
2014	Babloo Happy Hai	"Uhe Baatiyan"	Bishakh-Kanish	Protique Mojoomdar	
2014	2 States	"Iski Uski"	Shankar–Ehsaan–Loy	Amitabh Bhattacharya	
2014	2 States	"Hullaa Re"	Shankar–Ehsaan–Loy	Amitabh Bhattacharya	
2014	Manjunath	"Amma"	Sonam Sherpa	Rajneesh Bisht	
2014	Happy New Year	"India Waale"	Vishal–Shekhar	Irshad Kamil	Vishal Dadlani, KK, Neeti Mohan
2014	Happy New Year	"World Dance Medley"	Vishal–Shekhar	Irshad Kamil	Vishal Dadlani, KK, Neeti Mohan, Sukhwinder Singh, Shah Rukh Khan
2014	Happy New Year	"India Waale (Electronic mix)"	Vishal–Shekhar	Irshad Kamil	Vishal Dadlani, KK, Neeti Mohan
2014	Kill Dil	"Kill Dil"	Shankar–Ehsaan–Loy	Gulzar	Sonu Nigam
2014	Kill Dil	"Happy Budday"	Shankar–Ehsaan–Loy	Gulzar	Sukhwinder Singh
2014	Kill Dil	"Bol Beliya"	Shankar–Ehsaan–Loy	Gulzar	Siddharth Mahadevan, Sunidhi Chauhan
2014	Kill Dil	"Daiyya Maiyya"	Shankar–Ehsaan–Loy	Gulzar	Udit Narayan, Rasika Shekar, Javed Jaffrey
2014	Kill Dil	"Baawra"	Shankar–Ehsaan–Loy	Gulzar	Nihira Joshi Deshpande, Loy Mendonsa, Gulzar
2014	Kill Dil	"Nakhriley"	Shankar–Ehsaan–Loy	Gulzar	Ali Zafar, Mahalakshmi Iyer, Gulzar
2015	Dil Dhadakne Do	"Gallan Goodiyaan"	Shankar–Ehsaan–Loy	Javed Akhtar	
2015	Katti Batti	"Sau Aasoon"	Shankar–Ehsaan–Loy	Kumaar	
2015	Take It Easy (2015 film)	Mushkil Hai – Male"			
2016	Kabali	"Jag Hai Ye Dabang Ka"	Santhosh Narayanan		
2016	Mirzya	"Chakora"	Shankar–Ehsaan–Loy	Gulzar	
2016	Mirzya	"Aave Re Hitchki"	Shankar–Ehsaan–Loy	Gulzar	
2016	Mirzya	"Doli Re Doli"	Shankar–Ehsaan–Loy	Gulzar	
2016	Rock On 2	"Ishq Mastana"	Shankar–Ehsaan–Loy	Javed Akhtar	
2016	Sniff	"Jai Jai Ganaraj"	Mujtaba Aziz Naza		
2018	Raazi	"Dilbaro"	Shankar–Ehsaan–Loy	Gulzar	
2018	Soorma	"Soorma Anthem"	Shankar–Ehsaan–Loy	Gulzar	
2018	Soorma	"Pardesiyan"	Shankar–Ehsaan–Loy	Gulzar	
2018	Soorma	"Flicker Singh"	Shankar–Ehsaan–Loy	Gulzar	
2018	Manto	"Nagri Nagri"	Shankar–Ehsaan–Loy	Sneha Khanwalkar	
2018	Kaala (D)	"Sone Ki Tu Ek Murat"	Santosh Narayanan	Kumaar	
2018	Halkaa	Khushbeyein	Shankar–Ehsaan–Loy		
	Terror Strike	"Mera Desh Re"	Shankar–Ehsaan–Loy	Sahil Sultanpuri	
2019	Mere Pyare Prime Minister	"Rezgaariyaan"	Shankar–Ehsaan–Loy	Gulzar	
2019	Mere Pyare Prime Minister	"Bajaa Bajaa Dhol Bajaa"	Shankar–Ehsaan–Loy	Gulzar	
2019	Manikarnika: The Queen of Jhansi	"Bharaat"(Version l)	Shankar–Ehsaan–Loy	Prasoon Joshi	
2019	Manikarnika: The Queen of Jhansi	"Vijayi Bhava"	Shankar–Ehsaan–Loy	Prasoon Joshi	
2019	Manikarnika: The Queen of Jhansi	"Shiv Tandav"	Shankar–Ehsaan–Loy	Prasoon Joshi	
2019	Manikarnika: The Queen of Jhansi	"Bharaat"(Version ll)	Shankar–Ehsaan–Loy	Prasoon Joshi	
2019	Saaho	"Baby Won't You Tell Me"	Shankar–Ehsaan–Loy	Manoj Yadav	
2019	The Zoya Factor	"Lucky Charm"	Amitabh Bhattacharya		
2019	Sye Raa Narasimha Reddy (D)	"Jaago Narsimha Jaago Re"	Amit Trivedi	Swanand Kirkire	
2019	Jhalki	"Poora Bachpan"	Sandesh Shandilya	Jhankar	

=== 2020s ===
Year	Film	Song	Composer(s)	Writer(s)	Co-singer(s)
2020	Panga	"Jugnu"	Shankar–Ehsaan–Loy	Javed Akhtar	
2020	Street Dancer 3D	"Hindustani"	Shankar–Ehsaan–Loy	Sameer	Udit Narayan
2020	It's My Life	"Tu Maharani"	Shankar–Ehsaan–Loy	Shabbir Ahmed	
2021	Toofaan	"Purvaiya"	Shankar–Ehsaan–Loy	Javed Akhtar	
2021	Bhuj: The Pride of India	"Aarti"	Amar Mohile	Abhilash	
2021	Thalaivii	"Hai Kamaal"	G. V. Prakash Kumar	Irshad Kamil	
2022	Code Name: Tiranga	"Vande Mataram"	Vipin Patwa	Kumar, Bankim Chandra Chatterjee	
2022	Dhaakad	"Namonishan"	Shankar–Ehsaan–Loy	Amitabh Bhattacharya	Nikhita Gandhi
2022	Dear Dia	"Bawra Mann"	Rishabh Srivastava		
2023	Dono	"Raangla"	Shankar–Ehsaan–Loy	Irshad Kamil	Pratibha Singh Baghel
2023	Sam Bahadur	"Badthe Chalo"	Shankar–Ehsaan–Loy	Gulzar	Vishal Dadlani, Divya Kumar
2023	Sam Bahadur	"Banda"	Shankar–Ehsaan–Loy	Gulzar	
2024	Hanu-Man	"Anjanadri"	Gowra Hari		
2024	Lal Salaam	"Ja Se Jalsa"	A. R. Rahman		
2024	Razakar – Silent Genocide of Hyderabad	"Chalo Re Saathi"	Bheems Ceciroleo	Ritesh Rajwada	
2025	Sitaare Zameen Par	"Good for Nothing"	Shankar–Ehsaan–Loy	Amitabh Bhattacharya	Amitabh Bhattacharya
2025	Sitaare Zameen Par	"Shubh Mangalam"	Shankar–Ehsaan–Loy	Amitabh Bhattacharya	Amitabh Bhattacharya
2025	Sitaare Zameen Par	"Sitaare Zameen Par" (Title Track)	Shankar–Ehsaan–Loy	Amitabh Bhattacharya	Siddharth Mahadevan, Divya Kumar
2025	Tere Ishk Mein	"Chinnaware"	A. R. Rahman	Dhanush	
2026	Jailer 2 (((D)))	"Beete Lamhe"	Anirudh Ravichander	Ritesh G. Rao	

== Tamil film songs ==
=== 1990s ===
Year	Film	Song	Composer(s)	Writer(s)	Co-artist(s)
1994	Aladdin (D)	"Arabian Nights" (Tamil)	Alan Menken		
1997	V. I. P.	"Netru No No"	Ranjit Barot	Palani Bharathi	Dominique Cerejo
1997	Minsara Kanavu	"Vennilavae" (Sad)	A. R. Rahman	Vairamuthu	Kavita Paudwal
1999	Nilave Mugam Kaattu	"Chittu Parakkuthu"	Ilaiyaraaja	Mu. Metha	Sujatha
1999	Antahpuram	"Thai Thaga Thai"	Ilaiyaraaja	Mu. Metha	Gopika Poornima
1999	Sangamam	"Varaha Nadhikarayoram"	A. R. Rahman	Vairamuthu	
1999	Hello	"Valentines"	Deva	Na. Muthukumar	Sabesh
1999	Mudhalvan	"Mudhalvane"	A. R. Rahman	Vairamuthu	S. Janaki
1999	Mudhalvan	"Uppu Karuvadu"	A. R. Rahman	Vairamuthu	Kavita Krishnamurthy
1999	Unnaruge Naan Irundhal	"Podava Kattina"	Deva	Palani Bharathi	Anuradha Sriram
1999	Rajasthan	"Sorgathil Nikka"	Ilaiyaraaja		
1999	Shankar	"Jigu Jigu"	Mani Sharma		

=== 2000s ===
Year	Film	Song	Composer(s)	Writer(s)	Co-artist(s)
2000	Sudhandhiram	"Coco Cola"	S. A. Rajkumar	Kalaikumar	Swarnalatha
2000	Alaipayuthey	"September Madham"	A. R. Rahman	Vairamuthu	Asha Bhosle
2000	Alaipayuthey	"Endrendrum Punnagai"	A. R. Rahman	Vairamuthu	Clinton Cerejo, Srinivas, A. R. Rahman
2000	Kandukondain Kandukondain	"Enna Solla Pogirai"	A. R. Rahman	Vairamuthu	
2000	Kushi	"Kattipudi Kattipudida"	Deva	Vairamuthu	Vasundhara Das, Ganga
2000	Kannan Varuvaan	"Kadala Kattu Kuyile"	Sirpy	Pa. Vijay	Sujatha
2000	Kannan Varuvaan	"Kattraruntha Thendrale"	Sirpy		
2000	Unnai Kodu Ennai Tharuven	"Idduppu Selaikkulla"	S. A. Rajkumar	Pa. Vijay	Anuradha Sriram
2000	Appu	"Vaada Vaa"	Deva	Vairamuthu	P. Unnikrishnan
2000	Vetri Kodi Kattu	"Thillele Thillele"	Deva	Vairamuthu	Krishnaraj
2000	Vetri Kodi Kattu	"Latchama Latchama"	Deva	Vairamuthu	
2000	Simmasanam	"Adiye Aelankiliye"	S. A. Rajkumar	Vaali	Swarnalatha
2000	Parthen Rasithen	"Thinnadhey"	Bharadwaj	Vairamuthu	Anuradha Sriram
2000	Rhythm	"Thaniye"	A. R. Rahman	Vairamuthu	
2000	Uyirile Kalanthathu	"Kannal Vanthu"	Deva	Vairamuthu	
2000	Priyamaanavale	"June July Maasathil"	S. A. Rajkumar	Vairamuthu	Harini
2000	Thenali	"Thenali"	A. R. Rahman	Ilayakamban	Clinton Cerejo
2000	Anbudan	"Andha Suriyane"	Jai	Vairamuthu	Mahalakshmi Iyer
2000	Anbudan	"Kamban Enge"	Jai	Vairamuthu	
2000	Vanna Thamizh Pattu	"Vanna Kathavugal"	S. A. Rajkumar	Vaali	
2000	Mr Naradar	"Naradare"	Sirpy		
2000	Budget Padmanabhan	"Thaiya Thaiyare"	S. A. Rajkumar		
2000	Vallarasu	"Nenje Nenje"	Deva		
2000	Pottu Amman	"En Manathai"	SD Shantha Kumar		
2001	Dheena	"Kadhal Website Ondru"	Yuvan Shankar Raja	Vaali	Harini, Timmy
2001	Friends	"Kuyilukku Koo Koo"	Ilaiyaraaja	Palani Bharathi	S. P. Balasubrahmanyam, Hariharan
2001	Minnale	"Oh Mama Mama"	Harris Jayaraj	Vaali	Tippu
2001	Pappa	"Oruvanoruvan"	Mani Sharma		
2001	Pappa	"Rama O Rama"	Mani Sharma		
2001	Murari	"Dum Dum Melangal"	Mani Sharma		
2001	Murari	"Muthadava"	Mani Sharma		
2001	Rishi	"Kaatrodu Puyalai"	Yuvan Shankar Raja	Pa. Vijay	Annupamaa
2001	Badri	"Kalakalakudhu"	Ramana Gogula	Palani Bharathi	
2001	Sonnal Thaan Kaadhala	"Vela Vela"	T. Rajendar		
2001	Citizen	"Pookara Pookara"	Deva	Vairamuthu	Vasundhara Das
2001	Citizen	"Chikkimukki Kallu"	Deva	Vairamuthu	Sadhana Sargam
2001	Citizen	"Merkey Vidhaitha Sooriyaney" (II)	Deva	Vairamuthu	
2001	Love Channel	"Ultra Modern"	Deva	Pa. Vijay	
2001	Narasimha	"Egyptu Raani"	Mani Sharma	Pa. Vijay	Harini
2001	Narasimha	"Innoru Desiya Geetham"	Mani Sharma		
2001	Star	"Thom Karuvil Irundhom"	A. R. Rahman	Vairamuthu	
2001	Poovellam Un Vasam	"Thaalattum Kaatre Vaa"	Vidyasagar	Vairamuthu	
2001	Vedham	"Hey Meenalochani"	Vidyasagar	Pa. Vijay	Swarnalatha
2001	Vedham	"Oh Anbe"	Vidyasagar	Pa. Vijay	
2001	Samudhiram	"Azhagana Chinna Devathai"	Sabesh–Murali	Vairamuthu	
2001	Samudhiram	"Pineapple Vannathodu"	Sabesh–Murali	Pa. Vijay	Harini
2001	Chocolate	"Dhuryodhana Dhuryodhana"	Deva	Vairamuthu	Mahalakshmi Iyer
2001	Alli Thanda Vaanam	"Vaadi Vaadi Naattukkattai"	Vidyasagar	Arivumathi	Sujatha
2001	Mitta Miraasu	"Jal Jal"	Aslam Mustafa	Vairamuthu	
2001	Aalavandhan	"Aalavandhan"	Shankar–Ehsaan–Loy	Vairamuthu	
2001	Aalavandhan	"Un Azhagukku"	Shankar–Ehsaan–Loy	Vairamuthu	Sujatha
2001	Aandan Adimai	"Anne Anne"	Ilaiyaraaja	Vaali	
2001	Manadhai Thirudivittai	"All Day Jolly Day"	Yuvan Shankar Raja	Pa. Vijay	Yuvan Shankar Raja
2001	Paarthale Paravasam	"Manmadha Maasam"	A. R. Rahman	Vaali	Nithyasree Mahadevan
2001	Shahjahan	"Sarakku Vachirukken"	Mani Sharma	Vairamuthu	Radhika Thilak
2001	Thavasi	"Ethanai Ethanai"	Vidyasagar	Kabilan	S. Janaki
2001	Thavasi	"Panchangam Paarkathey"	Vidyasagar	Palani Bharathi	Chitra Sivaraman, Srivarthini
2001	Azhagana Naatkal	"Kadhal OK"	Deva	Pa. Vijay	Sujatha
2001	Majunu	"Pada Pada Pattampoochi"	Harris Jayaraj	Vairamuthu	Kavita Krishnamurthy
2002	Alli Arjuna	"Onne Onne"	A. R. Rahman	Arivumathi	Sadhana Sargam
2002	Pammal K. Sambandam	"Dindukkallu Poota"	Deva	Pa. Vijay	Mahalakshmi Iyer
2002	Punnagai Desam	"Engal Mootchukkulle"	S. A. Rajkumar	Vaali	
2002	Punnagai Desam	"Vettrikku Mel Vetri"	S. A. Rajkumar	Vaali	
2002	Angala Parameswari	"Sivaraajan"	Dhina	Kalaikumar	Nithyasree Mahadevan
2002	Gemini	"Naattu Katta"	Bharadwaj	Vairamuthu	Swarnalatha
2002	Thamizh	"Azhagaana"	Bharadwaj	Vaali	
2002	Thamizhan	"La La La Law Padichom"	D. Imman	Vairamuthu	Lavanya
2002	123	"Adada Nadanthu Vara"	Deva	Kalaikumar	Anuradha Sriram
2002	Ezhumalai	"Maina Kunjo"	Mani Sharma	Vaali	Sujatha
2002	Yai Nee Romba Azhaga Irukke	"Oru Kadhal Vanthucho"	Raaghav-Raja	Pa. Vijay	
2002	Shree	"Yaamirukka Bayamen"	T. S. Muralidharan	R. V. Udayakumar	Tippu, Vikram
2002	Youth	"Aalthotta Bhoopathi"	Mani Sharma	Kabilan	
2002	Karmegham	"Satham Podum"	Vidyasagar	Palani Bharathi	Srivarthini
2002	Baba	"Dippu Dippu"	A. R. Rahman	Vairamuthu	
2002	King	"Achuvellam Pachharisi"	Dhina	Vairamuthu	Mahalaxmi Iyer
2002	Arputham	"Aaha Anandam"	Shiva	Pa. Vijay	
2002	Album	"Nilave"	Karthik Raja	Pa. Vijay	
2002	Bagavathi	"Kai Kai... Vaikkura"	Deva	Kalaikumar	Anuradha Sriram
2002	Bagavathi	"Achamillai"	Deva	Snehan	
2002	Kadhal Azhivathillai	"Pillaiyaar Suzhi"	T. Rajendar	T. Rajendar	
2002	Villain	"Thappu Thandaa"	Vidyasagar	Vairamuthu	Sujatha
2002	I Love You Da	"Adichha Sixaru"	Bharadwaj	Snehan	
2002	Bala	"En Kannai"	Yuvan Shankar Raja	Palani Bharathi	
2002	Mounam Pesiyadhe	"En Anbe En Anbe"	Yuvan Shankar Raja	Kamakodiyan	
2002	Mounam Pesiyadhe	"En Nanbane Kobam"	Yuvan Shankar Raja	Snehan	Hariharan
2002	Vinnodum Mughilodum	"January February"	Deva		
2002	Vinnodum Mughilodum	"Listen To Me"	Deva		
2002	Kadhal Samrajyam	"Kalluri Padam"	Yuvan Shankar Raja		
2003	Dhool	"Aasai Aasai"	Vidyasagar	Pa. Vijay	Sujatha
2003	Vaseegara	"Aaha Enbargal"	S. A. Rajkumar	Pa. Vijay	
2003	Dum	"Kalakkuven Kalakkuven"	Deva	Pa. Vijay	
2003	Inidhu Inidhu Kadhal Inidhu	"Azhaguda"	Devi Sri Prasad	Vairamuthu	
2003	Jayam	"Kannamoochi Re Re"	R. P. Patnaik	Arivumathi	
2003	Ice	"Silaya Silaya"	Devi Sri Prasad	Yugabharathi	Mathangi
2003	Kadhal Kondein	"Manasu Rendum"	Yuvan Shankar Raja	Palani Bharathi	
2003	Alaudin	"Ukku Ukku Uganda"	Mani Sharma	Kavivarman	
2003	Thennavan	"Desa Kaatre"	Yuvan Shankar Raja	Pa. Vijay	Ganga
2003	Diwan	"Gundu Pakkara"	S. A. Rajkumar	Pa. Vijay	
2003	Thiruda Thirudi	"Manmadha Raasa"	Dhina	Yugabharathi	Malathy Lakshman
2003	Alai	"Alai Adikkuthu"	Vidyasagar	Pa. Vijay	
2003	Anjaneya	"Paavadai Panjavarnam"	Mani Sharma	Kabilan	
2003	Ottran	"Kitchu Kitchu"	Pravin Mani	Arivumathi	Lavanya
2003	Thirumalai	"Neeya Pesiyadhu"	Vidyasagar	Pa. Vijay	
2003	Iyarkai	"Alaiye Alaiye"	Vidyasagar	Vairamuthu	
2003	Anbe Un Vasam	"Yengaavathu"	Dhina	Kabilan	Sujatha
2003	Irandu Per	"Pakku Vethalai"	Sunil Varma		
2004	Engal Anna	"Aasai Arasa"	Deva	Palani Bharathi	Anuradha Sriram
2004	Jai	"Alek"	Mani Sharma	Vairamuthu	Kalpana Raghavendar
2004	Kovil	"Kokku Meena"	Harris Jayaraj	Snehan	Srilekha Parthasarathy
2004	Udhaya	"Enna Enna"	A. R. Rahman	Ilayakamban	Gopika Poornima
2004	Jairam	"Dama Dama"	Anoop Rubens	Arivumathi	
2004	Kuthu	"Kuththu Kuththu"	Srikanth Deva	Pa. Vijay	
2004	Aethirree	"Saithaane Saithaane"	Yuvan Shankar Raja	Pa. Vijay	Srilekha Parthasarathy
2004	Aethirree	"Ichu Thariyaa"	Yuvan Shankar Raja	Pa. Vijay	Srivarthini
2004	Jana	"Konjam Uravinayum"	Dhina	Snehan	
2004	Perazhagan	"Kaatru Enbatha"	Yuvan Shankar Raja	Pa. Vijay	Mathangi
2004	Aaytha Ezhuthu	"Hey Goodbye Nanba"	A. R. Rahman	Vairamuthu	Sunitha Sarathy, Lucky Ali, Karthik
2004	Machi	"Gummango"	A. R. Reihana	Kabilan	
2004	Super Da	"Ichu Thaa"	Deva	Victor Das	Malathy Lakshman
2004	Sullan	"Sandakozhi"	Vidyasagar	Na. Muthukumar	
2004	Madhurey	"Machan Peru Madhurey"	Vidyasagar	Kabilan	
2004	Arasatchi	"Ippadiye Vittu Vidu"	Harris Jayaraj	Na. Muthukumar	Swarnalatha
2004	M. Kumaran S/O Mahalakshmi	"Thamizh Nattu Mannava"	Srikanth Deva	Pa. Vijay	Premgi Amaren
2004	Manmadhan	"Vaanamunna"	Yuvan Shankar Raja	Na. Muthukumar	Palakkad Sreeram
2004	Aai	"Veluthu Kattu"	Srikanth Deva	Vaali	
2005	Thirupaachi	"Kumbida Pona Deivam"	Dhina	Perarasu	Malathy Lakshman
2005	Kicha Vayasu 16	"Patheyappadi"	Dhina	Pa. Vijay	Malathy Lakshman
2005	Sachein	"Va Va Va En Thalaiva"	Devi Sri Prasad	Pa. Vijay	
2005	Jithan	"Aa Mudhal Akku Thanada"	Srikanth Deva	Kabilan	
2005	Anniyan	"Kumaari"	Harris Jayaraj	Vairamuthu	Harini
2005	Aadhikkam	"16 Vayasula"	Chandrabose	Vairamuthu	
2005	Daas	"Vaa Vaa Vaa"	Yuvan Shankar Raja	Pa. Vijay	Mahalaxmi Iyer
2005	Anbe Aaruyire	"Maramkothiye"	A. R. Rahman	Vaali	Pop Shalini, Vasundhara Das, Blaaze
2005	Thotti Jaya	"Thotta Poweru Da"	Harris Jayaraj	Thamarai	
2005	Thotti Jaya	"Acchu Vella Karumbe"	Harris Jayaraj	Na. Muthukumar	Ranjith, Saindhavi
2005	Chanakya	"Voochi Voochi"	Srikanth Deva	Kalaikumar	
2005	Ghajini	"Rangola"	Harris Jayaraj	Kabilan	Sujatha
2005	Sivakasi	"Vaada Vaada"	Srikanth Deva	Perarasu	
2005	Majaa	"Aiyyarettu"	Vidyasagar	Pa. Vijay	Anuradha Sriram
2005	Majaa	"Chi Chi Chi Chi"	Vidyasagar	Yugabharathi	Harini, Savitha Reddy, Viji
2005	Bambara Kannaley	"Korukkupettai"	Srikanth Deva	Kabilan	
2005	Kanda Naal Mudhal	"Merke Merke"	Yuvan Shankar Raja	Thamarai	Sadhana Sargam
2005	Kanda Naal Mudhal	"Erimalai Naane"	Yuvan Shankar Raja	Thamarai	Vasundhara Das
2005	Aaru	"Soda Bottle"	Devi Sri Prasad	Na. Muthukumar	Mukesh
2005	Power Of Women	"Thatti Thatti"	Vidyasagar		
2005	Ambuttu Imbuttu Embuttu	"Adiyea Ammu"	Dhina		
2006	Paramasivan	"Undivila"	Vidyasagar	Pa. Vijay	Malathy Lakshman
2006	Paramasivan	"Paramasivane"	Vidyasagar	Vairamuthu	Tippu, Karthik, Ranjith, Jemon, Chandran
2006	Kodambakkam	"Kodambakkam Engalukku"	Sirpy	Jeevan Mayil	Sathyan
2006	Mercury Pookkal	"Pachakiliye"	Karthik Raja	Arivumathi	Priya
2006	Thirupathi	"Thirupathi Vantha"	Bharadwaj	Perarasu	
2006	Unakkum Enakkum	"Poopparikka Neeyum"	Devi Sri Prasad	Na. Muthukumar	
2006	Thimiru	"Maana Madurai"	Yuvan Shankar Raja	Na. Muthukumar	
2006	Sillunu Oru Kadhal	"Macchakkari"	A. R. Rahman	Vaali	Vasundhara Das
2006	Veyil	"Urugudhe Marugudhe"	G. V. Prakash Kumar	Na. Muthukumar	Shreya Ghoshal
2006	Poi	"Inge Inge Oru Paattu"	Vidyasagar	Pa. Vijay	
2006	Thagapansamy	"Sangu Chakara"	Srikanth Deva	Arivumathi	
2006	Adaikalam	"Kalyana Sundari"	Sabesh–Murali	Arivumathi	Anuradha Sriram
2007	Pokkiri	"Maambazhamaa Maambazham"	Mani Sharma	Snehan	Ganga
2007	Pori	"Eppadiyellam"	Dhina	Yugabharathi	
2007	Pori	"Vedhala Devathaiye"	Dhina	Yugabharathi	Malathy Lakshman
2007	Muruga	"Kutthunaa"	Karthik Raja	Pa. Vijay	
2007	Manikanda	"Pondicherry"	Deva	Kabilan	Anuradha Sriram
2007	Chennai 600028	"Saroja Saman Nikalo"	Yuvan Shankar Raja	Gangai Amaran	Premji Amaran
2007	Thiru Ranga	"Onnu Rendu"	Soundaryan	Pa. Vijay	
2007	Karuppusamy Kuththagaithaarar	"Karuppan Varuvaan"	Dhina	Yugabharathi	Jayamoorthy
2007	Thullal	"Sagala Ponnu"	Dhina	Kalaikumar	Ganga
2007	Kireedam	"Vilaiyaadu Vilaiyaadu"	G. V. Prakash Kumar	Na. Muthukumar	
2007	Manase Mounama	"Vinnukku Palam"	Naga	Pa. Vijay	
2007	Satham Podathey	"Azhagu Kutti Chellam"	Yuvan Shankar Raja	Na. Muthukumar	
2007	Nenjai Thodu	"Thondathe"	Srikanth Deva	Kabilan	Anuradha Sriram
2007	1977	"Vangha Kadal"	Vidyasagar		
2007	Kattradhu Thamizh	"Vaazhkai Enbadhu"	Yuvan Shankar Raja	Na. Muthukumar	
2007	Kannamoochi Yenada	"Andru Vandhadhum"	Yuvan Shankar Raja	Thamarai	Haricharan, Shweta Mohan
2007	Kannamoochi Yenada	"Putham Puthu"	Yuvan Shankar Raja	Thamarai	Vijay Yesudas
2007	Kannamoochi Yenada	"Sanjaram Seiyyum"	Yuvan Shankar Raja	Thamarai	Madhushree
2007	Machakaaran	"Jigiruthaanda"	Yuvan Shankar Raja	Na. Muthukumar	Snekha Panth
2007	Polladhavan	"Padichu Paathen"	G. V. Prakash Kumar	Pa. Vijay	
2007	Vel	"Indha Ooril"	Yuvan Shankar Raja	Na. Muthukumar	
2007	Vel	"Onnappola"	Yuvan Shankar Raja	Na. Muthukumar	Srilekha Parthasarathy
2007	Oram Po	"Gun Ganapathi"	G. V. Prakash Kumar	Pa. Vijay	T. Rajendar
2007	Oram Po	"Idhu Enna Mayam"	G. V. Prakash Kumar	Pa. Vijay	Alka Yagnik
2007	Billa	"Vethalaiya Potendi"	Yuvan Shankar Raja	Pa. Vijay	
2007	Mirugam	"Theivangal Enge"	Sabesh–Murali		
2007	Vaal Natchathiram	"Mannil Vinmenkhal"	Shankar–Ehsaan–Loy		
2007	Vaal Natchathiram	"Iravil Payanthen"	Shankar–Ehsaan–Loy		
2007	Vaal Natchathiram	"Ooi Ooi"	Shankar–Ehsaan–Loy		
2007	Johnny Gaddaar	"Move Your Body"	Shankar–Ehsaan–Loy		
2008	Subramaniapuram	"Kadhal Siluvayil"	James Vasanthan	Thamarai	
2008	Kuselan	"Cinema Cinema"	G. V. Prakash Kumar	Vaali	
2008	Saroja	"Nimirndhu Nil"	Yuvan Shankar Raja	Gangai Amaren	
2008	Aegan	"Hey Baby"	Yuvan Shankar Raja	Pa. Vijay	
2008	Thenavattu	"Usilambatti Sandhaiyile"	Srikanth Deva	Na. Muthukumar	Mahalakshmi Iyer, Senthildass Velayutham
2008	Poo	"Dheena"	S. S. Kumaran	Na. Muthukumar	Hemambiga
2008	Dindigul Sarathy	"Paruthikkattu"	Dhina	V. Elango	
2008	Silambattam	"Silambattam"	Yuvan Shankar Raja	Vaali	
2008	Thiruvannamalai	"Om Siva Siva"	Srikanth Deva	Perarasu	
2008	Thiruvannamalai	"Emmaiyaalum"	Srikanth Deva	Perarasu	
2008	Nayagan	"Irundhakka Allikodu"	Mariya Manogar		
2008	Vilaiyattu	"Magamaee Neum Vandu"	Jassie Gift		
2008	Inba	"Soora Thenga"	PB Balaji		
2009	Vennila Kabadi Kuzhu	"Kabadi Kabadi"	V. Selvaganesh	Francis Kriba	
2009	Siva Manasula Sakthi	"Oru Adangapidari"	Yuvan Shankar Raja	Na. Muthukumar	Shweta Mohan
2009	Yavarum Nalam	"Yavarum Nalam"	Shankar–Ehsaan–Loy	Thamarai	
2009	Yavarum Nalam	"Kaatrile Vaasame"	Shankar–Ehsaan–Loy	Thamarai	K. S. Chithra
2009	Yavarum Nalam	"Yavarum Nalam (remix)"	Shankar–Ehsaan–Loy	Thamarai	
2009	Yavarum Nalam	"Kaatrile Vaasame (remix)"	Shankar–Ehsaan–Loy	Thamarai	K. S. Chithra
2009	Adada Enna Azhagu	"Ulaga Azhagellam"	T. M. Jayamurugan	T. M. Jayamurugan	Karthik
2009	Ananda Thandavam	"Megam Pola"	G. V. Prakash Kumar	Thamarai	
2009	Naadodigal	"Sambho Siva Sambho"	Sundar C Babu	Yugabharathi	
2009	Naadodigal	"Sambho Jagadam"	Sundar C Babu	Yugabharathi	
2009	Vedigundu Murugesan	"Seenicheevu Sivappukkari"	Dhina	Yugabharathi	Darshana
2009	Anthony Yaar?	"Kanaa Ondru Kandaen"	Dhina	Snehan	Bombay Jayashree
2009	Madurai Sambavam	"Landhu Koduppom"	John Peter	Arivumathi	
2009	Arumugam	"Aarumugam"	Deva	Pa. Vijay	
2009	Palaivana Solai	"Chikkan"	C. R. Bobby	Vairamuthu	
2009	Vettaikkaaran	"Naan Adicha"	Vijay Antony	Kabilan	
2009	Kandhakottai	"Dishyum Dishyum"	Dhina	Viveka	Suchitra
2009	Indira Vizha	"Bumper Vacha"	Yatish Mahadev		

=== 2010s ===
Year	Film	Song	Composer(s)	Writer(s)	Co-artist(s)
2010	Jaggubhai	"Apple Laptop"	Rafee	Kabilan	Chinmayi
2010	Kathai	"Phoonk Doonga"	Paul Jacob		Blaaze, Malgudi Subha
2010	Kathai	"Neethaney"	Paul Jacob		Mahalakshmi Iyer
2010	Tamizh Padam	"Oru Sooravali"	Kannan	K. Chandru	
2010	Kola Kolaya Mundhirika	"Aasai Macchane"	V. Selvaganesh	Francis Kriba	Anuradha Sriram
2010	Kadhalagi	"Kaadhale Kaadhale"	A. R. Reihana	Vairamuthu	
2010	Pen Singam	"Sil Silla Sil Silla"	Deva	Pa. Vijay	Anuradha Sriram
2010	Pa. Ra. Palanisamy	"Thedivandhaen"	Dhina	Suresh Devaraj	Malathy Lakshman
2010	Raavanan	"Kaattu Sirukki"	A. R. Rahman	Vairamuthu	Anuradha Sriram
2010	Veluthu Kattu	"Singampatti"	Bharani	Kabilan	Charulatha Mani, Pallavi Surendar
2010	Thillalangadi	"Thothu Ponen"	Yuvan Shankar Raja	Viveka	
2010	Thambi Arjuna	"Puligal Konjam"	Dhina	Yugabharathi	Dhina
2010	Moscowin Kavery	"Adhigalai Pookal"	S. Thaman	Vairamuthu	Vardhini
2010	Drohi	"Sambhavami Yuge Yuge"	V. Selvaganesh	Kabilan	Naveen, Faraz
2010	Vallakottai	"Anjile Ondrai"	Dhina	Thabu Shankar	Dhina
2010	Chikku Bukku	"Oru Nila"	Colonial Cousins	Vaali	Chandrayee Bhattacharya, Uma Padmanabhan
2010	Agam Puram	"Ore Oru Ooru"	Sundar C Babu	Kabilan	
2010	Virudhagiri	"Makkal Oru Puram"	Sundar C Babu	Yugabharathi	
2010	Aattanayagann	"Lakkadi"	Srikanth Deva	Vaali	
2010	Thenmerku Paruvakaatru	"Chinna Chinnangattula"	N. R. Raghunanthan	Vairamuthu	
2010	Ithanai Maalai Engirunthai	"Kutherayela"	Dhina		
2011	Pathinaaru	"Vaanam Namadhe"	Yuvan Shankar Raja	Snehan	
2011	Thoonga Nagaram	"Nee Siricha Kondattam"	Sundar C Babu	S. Annamalai	
2011	Aadu Puli	"Oorellam"	Sundar C Babu	Viveka	
2011	Seedan	"Valliamma"	Dhina	Pa. Vijay	Chinnaponnu
2011	Seedan	"Yaadhumaagiye"	Dhina	Pa. Vijay	Kavita Krishnamurthy
2011	Kullanari Koottam	"Kullanari Koottam"	V. Selvaganesh	Na. Muthukumar	
2011	Poraali	"Yaar Ivan"	Sundar C Babu	Na. Muthukumar	
2011	Ra.One (D)	"Pachai Poove"	Vishal–Shekhar	Vairamuthu	Akon, Shalini Singh
2011	Ra.One (D)	"Poovulagama"	Vishal–Shekhar	Vairamuthu	Unni Menon, Mithoon
2011	Ra.One (D)	"Yarukum Nenje"	Vishal–Shekhar	Vairamuthu	
2011	Don 2 (D)	"Yaarum Ariyadha"	Shankar–Ehsaan–Loy		Sunitha Sarathy
2011	Mathikettan Salai	"Kaviya Kaviya"	Srikanth Deva		
2011	Kadhalukku Maranamillai	"Esshk Esshk"	Bharadwaj		
2011	Agarathi	"Iyanthadi Uyara"	Sundar C. Babu		
2011	Margazhi 16	"Karakkan Murakkan"	EK Bobby		
2011	Appavi	"Vaada"	Joshua Sridhar		
2012	Vinmeengal	"Nee Kaattil"	Jubin		
2012	Kollaikaran	"Saami Kutham"	Johan Shevanesh	Viveka	
2012	Maasi	"Naan Paartha"	Dhina	Yugabharathi	Saindhavi
2012	Marupadiyum Oru Kadhal	"Ullam Kollai Ponen"	Srikanth Deva	Vasu Kokila	
2012	Saguni	"Kandha Kaara Vadai"	G. V. Prakash Kumar	Paramu	Karthi
2012	Mirattal	"Radio Radio"	Pravin Mani	Viveka	Suchitra
2012	Podaa Podi	"I am a Kuthu Dancer"	Dharan	Silambarasan	Silambarasan
2012	Udumban	"Paazhai Pona Manam"	Ramji S Bala		
2012	Udumban	"Vaanukku Nilavu"	Ramji S Bala		
2012	Kasi Kuppam	"Nalla Neram"	PB Balaji		
2012	Meenkothi	"Kandravi Kaadal Paru"	Dhina		
2012	Kozhi Koovuthu	"Kaatraga En"	ES Ramraj		
2013	Vishwaroopam	"Unnai Kanaadhu Naan"	Shankar–Ehsaan–Loy	Kamal Haasan	
2013	Haridas	"Annayin Karuvil"	Vijay Antony	Annamalai	
2013	Isakki	"Ooru Usilampatti"	Srikanth Deva	Annamalai	Mahalakshmi
2013	Singam II	"Vaale Vaale"	Devi Sri Prasad	Viveka	
2013	Pattathu Yaanai	"Thalakaal Puriyala"	S. Thaman	Na. Muthukumar	Suchitra
2013	Arrambam	"Adadadaa Aarambame"	Yuvan Shankar Raja	Pa. Vijay	
2013	Therodum Veedhiyile	"Thaalelo"	D. Imman		
2014	Kaththi	"Paalam"	Anirudh Ravichander		
2014	Jilla	"Pattu Onnu"	D. Imman	Yugabharathi	S. P. Balasubrahmanyam
2014	Thegidi	"Neethane"	Nivas K. Prasanna	Kabilan	
2014	Oru Modhal Oru Kadhal	"Punjabiya Partha"	Kawin Siva	Piraisoodan	Sunidhi Chauhan
2014	Oru Modhal Oru Kadhal	"Punjabiya Partha (remix)"	Kawin Siva	Piraisoodan	Sunidhi Chauhan
2014	Damaal Dumeel	"Odi Odi"	S. Thaman	Na. Muthukumar	
2014	Nalanum Nandhiniyum	"Sala Sala"	Ashwath Naganathan	Viveka	Sachin Warrier
2014	Nerungi Vaa Muthamidathe	"Kaligaalam"	Madley Blues	Na. Muthukumar	
2014	Venmegam	"Vannangal Neeyanal"	Jaffer Hanni		
2014	Kantharvan	"Lakka Lankatika"	Alex Paul		
2014	Vingyani	"Kadhavai Saathadi"	Maris Vijay		
2014	Happy New Year	"India Waale"	Vishal–Shekhar		
2015	Patra	"Unnai Ninaithal"	Sri Krishna		
2015	Massu Engira Masilamani	"Therikkudhu Mass"	Yuvan Shankar Raja		
2015	Darling	"Unnale"	G. V. Prakash Kumar		Shreya Ghoshal
2015	Anegan	"Roja Kadale"	Harris Jayaraj	Vairamuthu	Sunidhi Chauhan, Chinmayi
2015	Thilagar	"Vellavi Manasu"	Kannan		Palakkad Sreeram
2015	Indru Netru Naalai	"Kadhale Kadhale"	Hiphop Tamizha	Vivek	Padmalatha
2015	Indru Netru Naalai	"Indru Netru Naalai"	Hiphop Tamizha	Hiphop Tamizha	Aalap Raju
2015	Puli	"Sottavaala"	Devi Sri Prasad	Vairamuthu	M. M. Manasi
2015	Thagaval	"Kathak Poo Thamarai"	Sajid Thendral		
2016	Kodi	"Vettu Pottu"	Santhosh Narayanan		
2016	Thozha	"Baby Odadhe"	Gopi Sundar		
2016	Moondraam Ullaga Por	"Indiya Naade"	Ved Shankar	Annamalai	
2016	Saagasam	"Pudikkum"	S. Thaman	Kabilan	Shreya Ghoshal
2016	Meen Kuzhambum Mann Paanaiyum	"Yellam Nadagam Endrayo"	D. Imman	Madhan Karky	
2017	Bogan	"Vaarai Vaarai"	D. Imman	Madhan Karky	Shreya Ghoshal
2017	Motta Shiva Ketta Shiva	"Adaludan Paadalai Kettu"	Amresh Ganesh	Alangudi Somu	Padmalatha, Amresh Ganesh, Jack Styles
2017	Motta Shiva Ketta Shiva	"Shiva Vechitanda Kaala"	Amresh Ganesh	Viveka	Amresh Ganesh
2017	Shivalinga	"Chinna Kabali"	S. Thaman	Viveka	Naveen, Arunraja Kamaraj
2017	Adhagappattathu Magajanangalay	"Idharkkuthaane"	D. Imman		Vandana Srinivasan
2017	Kurangu Bommai	"Paathum Paakkaama"	B. Ajaneesh Loknath	J. Francis Kiruba	
2017	Karuppan	"Karuva Karuva Payale"	D. Imman	Yugabharathi	Shashaa Tirupati
2017	Oru Kanavu Pola	"Van Endrum"	ES Raam		
2018	Kaala	"Thanga Sela"	Santhosh Narayanan	Arunraja Kamaraj	Ananthu, Pradeep Kumar
2018	Azhagumagan	"Koothadikkuthu Koothadikkuthu"	James Vasanthan	Yugabharathi	
2018	Sei	"Hero Hero"	NyX Lopez	Viveka	Chinnaponnu
2019	Viswasam	"Vettikattu"	D. Imman	Yugabharathi	Thambi Ramaiah
2019	Vennila Kabaddi Kuzhu 2	"Kabaddi Kabaddi"	V. Selvaganesh		
2019	Devi 2	"Sokkura Penne"	Sam C. S.	Arunraja Kamaraj	
2019	Manikarnika: The Queen of Jhansi (D)	Bhaaradham"	Shankar–Ehsaan–Loy	Madhan Karky	
2019	Manikarnika: The Queen of Jhansi (D)	"Jeyam Unadhae"	Shankar–Ehsaan–Loy	Madhan Karky	
2019	Saaho	"Baby Won't You Tell Me"	Shankar–Ehsaan–Loy	Madhan Karky	Shweta Mohan
2019	Sye Raa Narasimha Reddy (D)	"Paaraai Narasimmaa Nee Paaraai"	Amit Trivedi	Madhan Karky	Anurag Kulkarni, Haricharan
2019	Sangathamizhan	"Maaradha"	Vivek–Mervin		

=== 2020s ===
Year	Film	Song	Composer(s)	Writer(s)	Co-singer(s)
2020	Street Dancer 3D	"Hindustani"	Shankar–Ehsaan–Loy	Veeramani Kannan	
2021	Aranmanai 3	"Theeyaga Thondri"	C. Sathya	Nattu Raja Durai	Hariharan
2022	Kadala Poda Oru Ponnu Venum	"Yendi Enna Paatha"	Jubin	Yugabharathi	
2023	Varisu	"Vaa Thalaivaa"	Thaman S	Vivek	Karthik, Deepak Blue, Aravind Srinivasan
2023	Ponniyin Selvan: II	"Veera Raja Veera"	A. R. Rahman	Ilango Krishnan	K. S. Chithra, Harini
2023	Paramporul	"Sippara Rippara"	Yuvan Shankar Raja	Vivek	
2023	Otta	"Ek Kaadal Nadiye"	M. Jayachandran	Vairamuthu	Shreya Ghoshal
2024	Lal Salaam	"Ther Thiruvizha"	A. R. Rahman	Vivek	A. R. Reihana, Deepthi Suresh, Yogi Sekar
2024	Dhonima	"Moradaa Un Thali"	EJ Johnson	S Gnanakaravel	Vandana Srinivasan
2024	Aalan	"Naan Enge"	Manoj Krishna	Karthik Netha	
2025	Tere Ishk Mein - (((D)))	"Chinnaware"	A. R. Rahman	Dhanush	
2026	Jailer 2	"Netru Ponavai"	Anirudh Ravichander	Vingesh Shivan	

== Telugu film songs ==
=== 1994 ===
Film	No	Song	Composer(s)	Writer(s)	Co—artist(s)
Aladdin	1	"Arabian Nights"	Alan Menken		

=== 1995 ===
Film	No	Song	Composer(s)	Writer(s)	Co-artist(s)
Bombay	2	"Idhi Maathribhoomi"	A. R. Rahman	Veturi Sundaramurthi	K. S. Chithra

=== 1998 ===
Film	No	Song	Composer(s)	Writer(s)	Co-artist(s)
Anthahpuram	3	"Shivamethara Sambayya"	Ilaiyaraaja	Sirivennela Sitaramasastri	Gopika Poornima
Choodalani Vundi	4	"Oh Mariya"	Mani Sharma	Chandrabose	Kavita Krishnamurti

=== 1999 ===
Film	No	Song	Composer(s)	Writer(s)	Co-artist(s)	Note(s)
Oke Okkadu	5	"Uttimeeda Koodu"	A. R. Rahman	A. M. Rathnam, Shiva Ganeshan	Kavita Krishnamurti	
Oke Okkadu	6	"Magadheera Dheera"	A. R. Rahman	A. M. Rathnam, Shiva Ganeshan	S. Janaki	
Premaku Velayera	7	"Thalatala Tharakalaaga"	S. V. Krishna Reddy		Harini	
Raja Kumarudu	8	"Bollywood Balaraju"	Mani Sharma	Veturi Sundaramurthi		
Ravoyi Chandamama	9	"Jagadajam Javani"	Mani Sharma	Veturi Sundaramurthi	K. S. Chithra	
Seenu	10	"Aatakundo Time"	Mani Sharma	Bhuvana Chandra		

=== 2000 ===
Film	No	Song	Composer(s)	Writer(s)	Co-artist(s)
Chiru Navvutho	11	"Hoyyaare"	Mani Sharma		
Chiru Navvutho	12	"Sonare Sonare"	Mani Sharma		K. S. Chithra
Jayam Manadera	13	"Don't Miss"	Vandemataram Srinivas		
Kalisundam Raa	14	"Boom Boom"	S. A. Rajkumar		
Kodanda Ramudu	15	"Mounika Mounika"	S. V. Krishna Reddy		K. S. Chithra
Kodanda Ramudu	16	"Manipuri Nadakalatho"	S. V. Krishna Reddy		K. S. Chithra
Manasunna Maaraju	17	"Allari Priyuda"	Vandemataram Srinivas		
Manoharam	18	"Sari Sari Natanala"	Mani Sharma		K. S. Chithra
Nuvvu Vastavani	19	"Railu Nandini"	S. A. Rajkumar	Chandrabose	
Priyuralu Pilichindi	20	"Yemi Cheyamanduve"	A. R. Rahman	A. M. Rathnam	
Ravanna	21	"Aadhi Soma"	S. A. Rajkumar		Anuradha Sriram
Rayalaseema Ramanna Chowdary	22	"Raamanna Raamanaa"	Mani Sharma		
Rayalaseema Ramanna Chowdary	23	"Yedhure Ledhinka"	Mani Sharma		
Rhythm	24	"Ichate Nenichate"	A. R. Rahman		
Sakhi	25	"September Maasam"	A. R. Rahman	Veturi Sundaramutri	S. Janaki
Sakhi	26	"Vasanthapu Navvulam"	A. R. Rahman	Veturi Sundaramutri	Clinton, Srinivas
Vamsi	27	"ABC Daatindo"	Mani Sharma	Sirivennela Sitaramasastri	
Vamsi	28	"Oho Soniya"	Mani Sharma	Chandrabose	
Yuvakudu	29	"Tha Tha Thi Jathuleyya"	Mani Sharma		
Yuvaraju	30	"Nookalisthe"	Ramana Gogula		Nanditha

=== 2001 ===
Film	No	Song	Composer(s)	Writer(s)	Co-artist(s)
Aakarshana	31	"Chekku Mukkila"	Muralidharan	Chandrabose	Swarnalatha
Adhipathi	32	"Aada Brathuke"	Koti	Ande Sri	
Adhipathi	33	"Panchadhaara"	Koti	Suddala Ashok Teja	Radhika
Bava Nachadu	34	"Matotundhi Magada"	M. M. Keeravani	Sirivennela Sitaramasastri	Anuradha Sriram
Bava Nachadu	35	"Very Sexy"	M. M. Keeravani	Chandrabose	Ganga Sitharasu
Bava Nachadu	36	"Bang Bang"	M. M. Keeravani	Sirivennela Sitaramasastri	Suneetha Rao
Bhadrachalam	37	"Okate Jananam"	Vandemataram Srinivas	Suddala Ashok Teja	K. S. Chithra
Bhalevadivi Basu	38	"Yehi Hai Right Choice"	Mani Sharma	Kulashekar	
Bhalevadivi Basu	39	"Ammammo Brahma"	Mani Sharma	Bhuvana Chandra	Gopika Poornima
Citizen	40	"Poojari Poojari"	Deva		
Citizen	41	"Chilli Bugga"	Deva		
Daddy	42	"Lucky Lucky"	S. A. Rajkumar		
Devi Putrudu	43	"Rama O Rama"	Mani Sharma	Jonnavittula Ramalingeswara Rao	
Devi Putrudu	44	"Donga Donga"	Mani Sharma	Jonnavittula Ramalingeswara Rao	
Eduruleni Manishi	45	"Nadumunu Choosthe"	S. A. Rajkumar		
Eduruleni Manishi	46	Dam Dama Dam Dam"	S. A. Rajkumar		Sujatha, S. P. Balasubrahmanyam
Hanuman Junction	47	"Kushi Kushiga"	Suresh Peters		Swarnalatha
Jabili	48	"Jolly Jolly College"	S. V. Krishna Reddy		
Laila College	49	"Sushmitha"	Ghantadi Krishna	Ghantadi Krishna	
Mrugaraju	50	"Ramayya Padaletti"	Mani Sharma	Veturi Sundaramurti	
Murari	51	"Dum Dum Dum"	Mani Sharma		
Murari	52	"Andhanike Andhanive"	Mani Sharma		
Naa Manasistha Raa	53	"Champodde"	S. A. Rajkumar		
Narasimha Naidu	54	"Abba Abba Andham"	Mani Sharma		Sujatha Mohan
Nuvvu Naaku Nachav	55	"O Navvu Chaalu"	Koti		
Paravasam	56	"Manmadha Maasam"	A. R. Rahman		Nithyasree Mahadevan
Paravasam	57	"Naadhir Dhinna"	A. R. Rahman		S. P. Sailaja
Prematho Raa	58	"Gopala"	Mani Sharma		Kalapana, Gopika, Prasanna
Priyamaina Neeku	59	"Nachenura Nachenura"	Shiva Shankar		Harini
Snehamante Idera	60	"Snehamante Idera"	Shiva Shankar		
Sri Manjunatha	61	"Om Mahaprana"	Hamsalekha		
Takkari Donga Chakkani Chukka	62	"Thom"	A. R. Rahman		
Takkari Donga Chakkani Chukka	63	"Maradhalive"	A. R. Rahman		

=== 2002 ===
Film	No	Song	Composer(s)	Writer(s)	Co-artist(s)
123	64	"Arere Nadaka Choodu"	Deva	Thompson	Anuradha Sriram
Adrustam	65	"Run Run"	Dhina	Vishwa	
Andham	66	"Ningiki Rangula"	Ghantadi Krishna	Mallemala	
Baba	67	"Dippu Dippu"	A. R. Rahman	Shiva Ganesh	
Bobby	68	"Ee Jenda"	Mani Sharma	Shakthi	
Chennakesava Reddy	69	"Don't Care"	Mani Sharma	Chandrabose	
Coolie	70	"All Andhra Mechina"	Vandemataram Srinivas	Velpula Venkatesh	Radhika
Coolie	71	"Lakdikapool"	Vandemataram Srinivas	Chirravuri Vijaykumar	Radhika
Gemini	72	"Nadaka Choosthe"	R. P. Patnaik	Veturi Sundara Ramamurhty	Usha
Girl Friend	73	"Kandireega Nadumu"	Vandemataram Srinivas	Thaidala Babu	
Girl Friend	74	"Thaluku Thaluku"	Vandemataram Srinivas	Thaidala Babu	Usha
Hero	75	"Veera Nuvvu Lera"	K. M. Radha Krishnan		
Idiot	76	"Choopultho Guchi"	Chakri	Kandikonda	
Indra	77	"Bham Bham Bhole"	Mani Sharma	Sirivennela Sitaramasastri	Hariharan
Jenda	78	"Ish Desh Me Ganga"	Vandemataram Srinivas	Suddala Ashok Teja	
Kubusam	79	"Noonugu Meesala"	Vandemataram Srinivas	Suddala Ashok Teja	
Kurrodochadu	80	"Jayam Jayam"	T. Rajendar		
Malli Malli Chudali	81	"Superu"	Yuvan Shankar Raja	Chandrabose	Sunidhi Chauhan
Malli Malli Chudali	82	"Teenage Paaparo"	Yuvan Shankar Raja	Bhuvana Chandra	Mathangi
Memu	83	"Jhum Jhum Tharaare"	Raghu Kaushik	Bhaskarabhatla	Usha
Manasutho	84	"Eppudu Chappudu"	Ashirvad	Suddala Ashok Teja	
Nuvve Nuvve	85	"Nidhura Pothunna"	Koti	Sirivennela Sitaramasastri	
Nuvvunte Chaalu	86	"Boom Boom"	Aakash	Vasanth	
Premalo Pavani Kalyan	87	"Cheppamma"	Ghantadi Krishna	Varikuppala Yadagiri	
Sandade Sandadi	88	"Yendhi Bhai"	Koti	Sahiti	
Santosham	89	"Dhin Dhinakthiri"	R. P. Patnaik	Kulashekar	
Seema Simham	90	"Manchitanam Inti Peru"	Mani Sharma	Chandrabose	
Seema Simham	91	Rendu Jella Papa"	Mani Sharma	Bhuvana Chandra	K. S. Chithra
Seshu	92	"Saayanthram"	Yuvan Shankar Raja	Chandrabose	
Siva Rama Raju	93	"Andala Chinni Devatha"	S. A. Rajkumar	Chirravuri Vijaykumar	Sujatha Mohan
Takkari Donga	94	"Naluguriki"	Mani Sharma	Chandrabose	

=== 2003 ===
Film	No	Song	Composer(s)	Writer(s)	Co-artist(s)
Aadanthe Ado Type	95	"O Prema O Prema"	Yuvan Shankar Raja	Surendra Krishna	
Aayudham	96	"Abba Yem"	Vandemataram Srinivas	Srivare	Anuradha Sriram
Aayudham	97	"Meghaale Eevela"	Vandemataram Srinivas	Warangal Srinivas	Swarnalatha
Ammulu	98	"Dekho Allah"	Vandemataram Srinivas	Gundavarapu Subbarao	
Boys	99	"Ayyappa"	A. R. Rahman	A. M. Rathnam	
Chantigadu	100	"Kokkoroko"	Vandemataram Srinivas	Kasarla Shyam	
Danush	101	"Chinna Papa"	Dhina	Bhuvana Chandra	Prasanna
Dham	102	"Addira Banna"	Ramana Gogula	Surendra Krishna	K. S. Chithra
Dongodu	103	"Kodi Munda Guddu"	Vidyasagar	Chandrabose	Rimi Tomy
Goa	104	"Entha Muddho"	Krishna Vasa	T Mani Sharma	Sunitha Upadrashta
Janaki Weds Sriram	105	"Eiffel Toweraina"	Ghantadi Krishna	Taidala Babu	Sureka Murthy
Juniors	106	"Hello Hello"	Chakri	Pothula Ravi Kiran	Kousalya
Kalyana Ramudu	107	"Sitakokamma"	Mani Sharma	Chandrabose	S. P. Charan
Kalyana Ramudu	108	"Dolu Baaja Sannayi"	Mani Sharma	Sirivennela Sitaramasastri	
Kalyana Ramudu	109	"Guthonkaaya"	Mani Sharma	Chandrabose	Sujatha Mohan
Missamma	110	"Entha Sukhamidho"	Vandemataram Srinivas	Bhuvana Chandra	Shreya Ghoshal
Neeku Nenu Naaku Nuvvu	111	"Prema Kanna"	R. P. Patnaik	Kulashekar	K. S. Chithra
Neetho Vastha	112	"One Two Three"	M. M. Srilekha	Veturi Sundara Ramamurhty	
Nenu Pelliki Ready	113	"Chandramukhi"	Chakri	Paidipalli Srinivas	Kousalya
Nenu Pelliki Ready	114	"Saavi One"	Chakri	Bhaskarabhatla	Smitha
O Radha Iddaru Krishnula Pelli	115	"Naa Gunde Kaalam"	Chakri	Paidipalli Srinivas	Kousalya
Okkadu	116	"Hare Rama"	Mani Sharma	Sirivennela Sitamramsastri	
Ottesi Cheputhunna	117	"Bandharulanti"	Vidyasagar		Swarnalatha
Ottu Ee Ammayi Evaro Theleedhu	118	"Nee Shepu Choosi"	Ghantadi Krishna	Jayasurya	Ganga Sitharasu
Palnati Brahmanayudu	119	"Bandarulo"	Mani Sharma	Veturi Sundara Ramamurhty	K. S. Chithra
Praanam	120	"Dhim Dhim Dhim"	Kamalakar	Suddala Ashok Teja	Kalpana Raghavendar
Premayanamaha	121	"Ennalluga"	Ramesh Erra	Chandrabose	
Raghavendra	122	"Calcutta Pan"	Mani Sharma	Suddala Ashok Teja	K. S. Chithra
Satyam	123	"Madhurame"	Chakri	Kandikonda	
Sivamani	124	"Sun Sun"	Chakri	Kandikonda	Kousalya
Tagore	125	"Kodithe Kottaalira"	Mani Sharma	Chandrabose	
Toli Choopulone	126	"Echecha"	Chakri	Bhaskarabhatla	
Toli Choopulone	127	"Sakhiya Sakhiya"	Chakri	Kandikonda	Kousalya
Vasantam	128	"O Lolly Papaki"	S. A. Rajkumar	Chandrabose	
Veede	129	"Andhamaina Papa Peru"	Chakri	Bhaskarabhatla	Kousalya
Villain	130	"Vaadichoopo"	Vidyasagar	Veturi Sundara Ramamurhty	Sujatha Mohan
Vishnu	131	"Vandhanam"	Ismail Darbar	Bhuvana Chandra	

=== 2004 ===
Film	No	Song	Composer(s)	Writer(s)	Co-artist(s)
Aapthudu	132	"Palle Palleki"	Ramana Gogula	Suddala Ashok Teja	
Anji	133	"Om Shanti Om"	Mani Sharma	Chandrabose	Ganga Sitharasu
Anji	134	"Chikubuku Pori"	Mani Sharma	Sirivennela Sitaramasastri	Kalpana Raghavendar
Arjun	135	"Shambhavami"	Mani Sharma	Veturi Sundara Ramamurhty	
Donga Dongadi	136	"Manmadha Raja"	Dhina	Veturi Sundara Ramamurhty	Malathy Lakshman
Kaasi	137	"Kottu Kottu"	Sri Kommineni	Suddala Ashok Teja	
Koduku	138	"Parimalame Puvvu"	Vandemataram Srinivas		
Koduku	139	"Koosindhi Koyakura"	Vandemataram Srinivas		
Lakshmi Narasimha	140	"Devunne Pilichavante"	Mani Sharma		
Lakshmi Narasimha	141	"Marumalli Jaabilli"	Mani Sharma		
Leela Mahal Center	142	"Balamanemmo"	S. A. Rajkumar		
Love Today	143	"O Prema"	Vidyasagar		
Malliswari	144	"Gundello Gulabila"	Koti		K. S. Chithra
Meeintikosthe Yemistharu Maaintikosthe Yemthestharu	145	"Chamakku Chakkera"	Ghantadi Krishna		
Monalisa	146	"Kurrakaaru Hero"	Valisha Sandeep		
Monalisa	147	"Chori Chori"	Valisha Sandeep		
Naani	148	"Markandeya"	A. R. Rahman	Veturi	Nithyasree Mahadevan
Oka Pellam Muddu Rendo Pellam Vaddu	149	"Iruvuri Bharyala"	Vandemataram Srinivas		
Samba	150	"Dam Damare"	Mani Sharma		
Shankar Dada M.B.B.S.	151	"Sandhe Poddhekuthandey"	Devi Sri Prasad		
Sri Anjaneyam	152	"Ooregi Raavayya"	Mani Sharma		
Sunday	153	"Sunday Sunday"	Sri Sunil Dharma		
Suryam	154	"Endakaalamlo"	Chakri	Suddala Ashok Teja	Sujatha Mohan
Swarabhishekam	155	"Kasthuri Thilakam"	Vidyasagar		Sujatha Mohan
Vaalliddaru Okkate	156	"Guri Thappadhura"	Vandemataram Srinivas		
Vijayendra Varma	157	"Mandapetalo"	Koti		K. S. Chithra
Yuva	158	"Hey Goodbye Priya"	A. R. Rahman	Veturi Sundaramurti	

=== 2005 ===
Film	No	Song	Composer(s)	Writer(s)	Co-artist(s)
Andarivaadu	159	"Okati Rendu Moodu"	Devi Sri Prasad		
Aparichithudu	160	"O Sukumaari"	Harris Jayaraj	Chandrabose	
Avunanna Kaadanna	161	"Nelathalli Gundelo"	R. P. Patnaik		
Bhageeratha	162	"Prapanchame"	Chakri	Chandrabose	
Chakram	163	"Rangeli Holi"	Chakri	Sirivennela Sitaramasastri	
Dhairyam	164	"Chacha Chichi"	Anup Rubens	Kula Shekar	Malgudi Subha
Dhana 51	165	"China Goda"	Chakri		
Jai Chiranjeeva	166	"Thillaana"	Mani Sharma		
Kaadhante Avunanile	167	"Ennenno"(Version l)	Sathyam		K. S. Chithra
Kaadhante Avunanile	168	"Ennenno"(Version ll)	Sathyam		K. S. Chithra
Kanchanamala Cable TV	169	"Krishna Kolataalu"	K. M. Radha Krishnan		
Kanchanamala Cable TV	170	"Nadhirdhina Nadumuna"	K. M. Radha Krishnan		
Kumkuma	171	"O Cheliya Naa Sakhiya"	Ghantadi Krishna		
Mahanandi	172	"Champakamala"	Kamalakar		
Majaa	173	"Chi Chi Chi"	Vidyasagar		
Modati Cinema	174	"Ninnaina Nedaina"	Swaraj		
Naa Alludu	175	"En Peru Murugan"	Devi Sri Prasad		
Narasimhudu	176	"Rajamandrike"	Mani Sharma		
Nuvvostanante Nenoddantana	177	"Chandrullo Unde"	Devi Sri Prasad		
Pandem	178	"Ammadu Gummadu"	Chakri		
Sada Mee Sevalo	179	"Lub Dub"	Vandemataram Srinivas		
Sankranti	180	"Doli Doli"	S. A. Rajkumar		K. S. Chithra
Sankranti	181	"Chilaka Chandanapattu"	S. A. Rajkumar		
Seenugadu Chiranjeevi Fan	182	"Annayya Annayya"	Shiva Kakani		
Seenugadu Chiranjeevi Fan	183	"Ninnemo Paaparo"	Shiva Kakani		
Thanks	184	"Holi"	Vandemataram Srinivas		
Thanks	185	"Kako Kaka"	Vandemataram Srinivas		
Whistles	186	"Erra Erra Buggalamma	Ramana Ogeti		

=== 2006 ===
Film	No	Song	Composer(s)	Writer(s)	Co-artist(s)
Abaddham	187	"Ichatey Ichatey"	Vidyasagar		
Annavaram	188	"Raakshasa Raajyam"	Ramana Gogula		
Astram	189	"Raa Chilaka"	S. A. Rajkumar	Bhaskarabhatla	Sujatha Mohan
Godavari	190	"Manasa Gelupu"	K. M. Radha Krishnan		K. S. Chithra
Hanumanthu	191	"O Hanumantha"	Vandemataram Srinivas		
Happy	192	"Nee Kosam"	Yuvan Shankar Raja	Sirivennela Sitaramasastri	
Khatarnak	193	"Bujji Bujji Paapa"	M. M. Keeravani	Jonnavittula Ramalingeswara Rao	Gayatri, Noel
Khatarnak	194	"Dhoma Kudithe"	M. M. Keeravani	Chandrabose	K. S. Chithra
Khatarnak	195	"Vesthaava"	M. M. Keeravani	Shiva Shakthi Datta	K. S. Chithra
Lakshmi	196	"Hey Satyabhama"	Ramana Gogula	Chandrabose	Sudha
Manasu Palike Mouna Raagam	197	"Thelusulo Jeevitham"	K. M. Radha Krishnan		
Maya Bazar	198	"Nadume Chitikantha"	K. M. Radha Krishnan	Veturi Sundara Ramamurhty	K. S. Chithra
Nuvvu Nennu Prema	199	"Bangaraanni"	A. R. Rahman		Sunitha Sarathy
Raam	200	"Made In Hyderabad"	Yuvan Shankar Raja	Chandrabose	
Rajababu	201	"Raajadhi Rajandi"	S. A. Rajkumar		
Raraju	202	"Dhaanimma"	Mani Sharma	Ananta Sriram	Anuradha Sriram
Rakhi	203	"Ninnu Choosthe"	Devi Sri Prasad	Chandrabose	Gopika Poornima
Sri Ramadasu	204	"Isvakulaku"	M. M. Keeravani	Ramadasu	
Sri Ramadasu	205	"Allah Rama"	M. M. Keeravani	Vedhavyas	Vijay Yesudas
Stalin	206	"Parare Parare"	Mani Sharma	Ananta Sriram	
Style	207	"Raa Raa"	Mani Sharma	Chinni Charan	
Veerabhadra	208	"Janam Kosam"	Mani Sharma	Bhashasri	

=== 2007 ===
Film	No	Song	Composer(s)	Writer(s)	Co-artist(s)
Aata	209	"Aata"	Devi Sri Prasad	Sirivennela Sitaramasastri	
Bangaru Konda	210	"Pakka Paapita"	Ghantadi Krishna		
Deva	211	"Kondapalli Nimmakaaya"	Yuvan Shankar Raja		
Deva	212	"Palakonda Kona Lona"	Yuvan Shankar Raja		
Don	213	"Su Su Suriyanna"	Raghava Lawrence	Chinni Charan	
Don	214	"Dhada Puttistha"	Raghava Lawrence	Chinni Charan	
Johnny Gaddaar	215	"Move Your Body"	Shankar–Ehsaan–Loy		
Kotha Katha	216	"Modalayyindhi"	Ghantadi Krishna		
Lakshmi Kalyanam	217	"Bava Bava"	R. P. Patnaik	Ramajogayya Sastry	Sujatha Mohan
Maharathi	218	"Uppu Chepa Pappu"	Gurukiran	Bhuvana Chandra	
Munna	219	"Baga Baga"	Harris Jayaraj	Kandikonda	
Nela Meedha Tharalu	220	"Ennadu Amma Cheppale"	Shankar–Ehsaan–Loy		
Nela Meedha Tharalu	221	"Meghala Dosillalo"	Shankar–Ehsaan–Loy		
Nela Meedha Tharalu	222	"Why Why Can't You"	Shankar–Ehsaan–Loy		
Nikki & Neeraj	223	"O Priya"	Vandemataram Srinivas		
Note Book	224	"Siri Siri Muvva"	Mickey J. Meyer		
Poramboku	225	Bangaram Ithey"	Mani Sharma		
Shankar Dada Zindabad	226	"Good Morning Hyderabad"	Devi Sri Prasad	Devi Sri Prasad	
Sri Sathyanarayana Swamy	227	"Aadhi Devudu"	Vandemataram Srinivas	Borra Subbaraya Sastry	
Ta Ra Rum Pum	228	"Naatho Forever"	Vishal–Shekhar		Shreya Ghoshal
Vijayadasami	229	"Raa Raa"	Srikanth Deva	Abhinaya Srinivas	
Yamadonga	230	"Young Yama"	M. M. Keeravani	Ananta Sriram	Mano
Yogi	231	"Dolu Baja"	Ramana Gogula		

=== 2008 ===
Film	No	Song	Composer(s)	Writer(s)	Co-artist(s)
Aapadhamokkulavadu	232	"Sathya Vilasitha"	Lelina Chowdary		
Chintakayala Ravi	233	"Oh Sunitha"	Vishal–Shekhar	Chandrabose	
Chintakayala Ravi	234	"Shava Shava"	Vishal–Shekhar		Mahalakshmi Iyer
Ekaloveyudu	235	"Sayyo Sayyo"	Anil Krishna		
Kantri	236	"Raamare"	Mani Sharma		Sunidhi Chauhan
Kathanayakudu	237	"Cinema Cinema"	G. V. Prakash Kumar		
King	238	"Nuvvu Ready"	Devi Sri Prasad		Gopika Poornima
Krishnarjuna	239	"A AA E Ee"	M. M. Keeravani	Ramajogayya Sastry	
Pandurangadu	240	"Sahasra Sheersa"	M. M. Keeravani	Sri Vedhayas	
Pandurangadu	241	"Sri Sri Raajadhi"	M. M. Keeravani	Sri Vedhayas	Geetha Madhuri
Somberi	242	"Surra Surranukura"	Mano		

=== 2009 ===
Film	No	Song	Composer(s)	Writer(s)	Co-artist(s)
A Aa E Ee	243	"Malli Malli"	M. M. Srilekha		
Anjaneyulu	244	"Anjali"	Thaman S	Chandrabose	Rahul Nambiar
Baanam	245	"Kadhile Paadham"	Mani Sharma	Vanamali	
Bangaru Babu	246	"Padhaharova Yeta"	M. M. Srilekha		K. S. Chithra
Bank	247	"Bank Bank"	Chinni Charan		
Konchem Ishtam Konchem Kashtam	248	"Aanandhama Aaratama"	Shankar–Ehsaan–Loy	Sirivennela Sitaramasastri	Shreya Ghoshal
Konchem Ishtam Konchem Kashtam	249	"Konchem Ishtam"	Shankar–Ehsaan–Loy	Sirivennela Sitaramasastri	
Konchem Ishtam Konchem Kashtam	250	"Endhuku Chenthaki"(Film)	Shankar–Ehsaan–Loy	Sirivennela Sitaramasastri	
Konchem Ishtam Konchem Kashtam	251	"Evade Subramanyam"	Shankar–Ehsaan–Loy	Chinni Charan	
Mesthri	252	"Anna Mesthri Anna"	Vandemataram Srinivas	Suddala Ashok Teja	
Mesthri	253	"Yedanunchi Vachavo"	Vandemataram Srinivas	Suddala Ashok Teja	
Naa Style Veru	254	"Elaare Ela Ela"	Anup Rubens		
Venkatadri	255	"Deva Sri Venkata"	Srikanth Deva		

=== 2010 ===
Film	No	Song	Composer(s)	Writer(s)	Co-artist(s)
Bhageerathudu	256	"Rajanna"(Version l)	Varikuppala Yadagiri		
Bhageerathudu	257	"Rajanna"(Version ll)	Varikuppala Yadagiri		
Bheemili Kabaddi Jattu	258	"Kabaddi"	V. Selvaganesh		
Brindavanam	259	"Ey Raja"	Thaman S	Ananta Sriram	Shreya Ghoshal
Dhool	260	"Manasutho Tholisariga"	Khuddas		
Lava Kusa: The Warrior Twins	261	"Om Shanthi Ugraroopa"	L. Vaidyanathan	Veturi Sundara Ramamurhty	
Lava Kusa: The Warrior Twins	262	"Rama Nama Mahima"	L. Vaidyanathan	Veturi Sundara Ramamurhty	
Love To Love	263	"Andharilo"	Colonial Cousins		
Maa Nanna Chiranjeevi	264	"Yemo Yeppudela"	Hemachandra		
Namo Venkatesa	265	"Ding Dong"	Devi Sri Prasad	Ramajogayya Sastry	Priya Himesh
Ragada	266	"Meesamunna Manmadhuda"	Thaman S	Ramajogayya Sastry	Rita Thyagarajan
Sambho Siva Sambho	267	"Shambo Siva Shambo"	Sundar C. Babu	Chinni Charan	
Sambho Siva Sambho	268	"Jagadam"	Sundar C. Babu		
Subhapradam	269	"Yelelo Yelelo"	Mani Sharma	Ananta Sriram	S. P. Balasubrahmanyam

=== 2011 ===
Film	No	Song	Composer(s)	Writer(s)	Co-artist(s)
Badrinath	270	"Omkareshwari"	M. M. Keeravani	Veturi Sundaramurti	M. M. Keeravani
Cricket Girls & Beer	271	"Shathruvai Yedhuta"	Shyam Daas		
Dookudu	272	"Nee Dookudu"	Thaman S		
Don 2	273	"Naalo Regeyney"	Shankar–Ehsaan–Loy		
G One	274	"Vanchinchina"	Vishal–Shekhar	Rajashri Sudhakar	Shalini Singh
G One	275	"O Pranama"	Vishal–Shekhar	Vanamali	Unni Menon
G One	276	"Chandramla"	Vishal–Shekhar	Bhuvana Chandra	
Mirapakay	277	"Dhinaku Dhin"	Thaman S	Chandrabose	Shreya Ghoshal
Nagaram Nidrapotunna Vela	278	"Nataraju Pooja"	Yashu Krishna	Suddala Ashok Teja	
Nenu Naa Rakshasi	279	"Malli Malli Merupula"	Rehman		
Pilla Zamindar	280	"Thalabadi"	V. Selvaganesh	Krishna Chaitanya	
Priyudu	281	"Cheliya Cheliya"	Mohan Jona		
Sangharshana	282	"Yevvaro Yevarithado"	Sundar C. Babu	Chandrabose	

=== 2012 ===
Film	No	Song	Composer(s)	Writer(s)	Co-artist(s)
Damarukam	283	"Dheemthana"	Devi Sri Prasad	Jonnavittula Ramalingeswara Rao	
Damarukam	284	"Shiva Shiva Shankara"	Devi Sri Prasad	Jonnavittula Ramalingeswara Rao	
Denikaina Ready	285	"Naalage Nenuntaanu"	Yuvan Shankar Raja	Ramajogayya Sastry	
Gabbar Singh	286	"Aakasham Ammayayithe"	Devi Sri Prasad	Chandrabose	Gopika Poornima
Genius	287	"Ye Navvu Venakala"	Joshua Sridhar	Krishna Chaitanya	
Nippu	288	"Vega Vega"	Thaman S		
Sakuni	289	"Khavo Karaa Vada"	G. V. Prakash Kumar		
Siva Manasulo Sruthi	290	"Osi Penki Pilla"	V. Selvaganesh		
Shirdi Sai	291	"Okkade Devudu"	M. M. Keeravani	Suddala Ashok Teja	Nagarjuna

=== 2013 ===
Film	No	Song	Composer(s)	Writer(s)	Co-artist(s)
Attarintiki Daredi	292	"Bapu Gari Bommo"	Devi Sri Prasad	Ramajogayya Sastry	
Jagadguru Adi Shankara	293	"Omkaram"	Nag Sri Vatsa	Vedavyas	
Masala	294	"Kotlallo Okkadey"	Thaman S	Krishna Chaitanya	
Naayak	295	"Laila O Laila"	Thaman S		
Ongole Gittha	296	"Yerra Mirapallo"	G. V. Prakash Kumar		
Ramayya Vasthavayya	297	"Neneppudaina"	Thaman S		Shreya Ghoshal
Ramayya Vasthavayya	298	"Kurrayeedu"	Thaman S		Suchitra
Telugabbai	299	"Hai Rama"	Mejo Joseph		Pavani Rajesh
Vishwaroopam	300	"Thupaki Thone Jeevitham"	Shankar–Ehsaan–Loy	Ramajogayya Sastry	Benny Dayal
Vishwaroopam	301	"Undalenandhi Naa Kannu"	Shankar–Ehsaan–Loy	Ramajogayya Sastry	Kamal Haasan

=== 2014 ===
Film	No	Song	Composer(s)	Writer(s)	Co-artist(s)
Aagadu	302	"Aagadu"	Thaman S		
Galipatam	303	"Paani Puri"	Bheems Ceciroleo	Sampath Nandi	
Geethanjali	304	"Vishwaroopam"	Praveen Lakkaraju		
Happy New Year	305	"India Waale"	Vishal–Shekhar	Ramajogayya Sastry	Neeti Mohan
Prabhanjanam	306	"Tharalina Ee Janam"	R. P. Patnaik		

=== 2015 ===
Film	No	Song	Composer(s)	Writer(s)	Co-artist(s)
Bengal Tiger	307	"Bengal Tiger"	Bheems Ceciroleo	Ramajogayya Sastry	Bhargavi Pillai
Kanche	308	"Ooru Yerayyindhi"	Chirrantan Bhatt	Sirivennela Sitaramasastri	
Red Alert	309	"Jai Jai Ganesha"	Ravi Varma		
Red Alert	310	"Jai Jai" (Reprise)	Ravi Varma		
Puli	311	"Pitta Kalla"	Devi Sri Prasad		
Subramanyam for Sale	312	"Telugante"	Mickey J. Meyer		

=== 2016 ===
Film	No	Song	Composer(s)	Writer(s)	Co-artist(s)
Janatha Garage	313	"Pranaamam"	Devi Sri Prasad	Ramajogayya Sastry	
Jyo Achyutananda	314	"Oka Lalana"(Male)	Kalyani Malik		
Oopiri	315	"Baby Aagodu"	Gopi Sundar		

=== 2017 ===
Film	No	Song	Composer(s)	Writer(s)	Co-artist(s)
Khaidi No. 150	316	"Neeru Neeru"	Devi Sri Prasad	Ramajogayya Sastry	
Om Namo Venkatesaya	317	"Pareeksha"	M. M. Keeravani	Ananta Sriram	
Sapthagiri LLB	318	"Chithurukke Chandurudu"	Vijay Bulganin		
Shivalinga	319	"Chinna Kabali"	Thaman S	Ramajogayya Sastry	

=== 2018 ===
Film	No	Song	Composer(s)	Writer(s)	Co-artist(s)
Gayatri	320	"Jai Hanuman"	Thaman S	Suddala Ashok Teja	
Kaala	321	"Raaye Naa"	Santhosh Narayanan		

=== 2019 ===
Film	No	Song	Composer(s)	Writer(s)	Co-artist(s)	Note(s)
Arjun Suravaram	322	"Che Guevara"	Sam C. S.	Varikuppala Yadagiri		
Ayyappa Kataaksham	323	"Soham Omkaaramae"	V. S. L. Jayakumar	V. S. P. Tenneti		
Maharshi	324	"Padara Padara"	Devi Sri Prasad	Sri Mani		
Manikarnika: The Queen of Jhansi	325	"Bharath Vardhillali"	Shankar–Ehsaan–Loy	Chaitanya Prasad		Dubbed
Manikarnika: The Queen of Jhansi	326	"Vijayibhava"	Shankar–Ehsaan–Loy	Chaitanya Prasad	Hamsika Iyer	
Manikarnika: The Queen of Jhansi	327	"Shiva Thandavam"	Shankar–Ehsaan–Loy	Prasoon Joshi		
Saaho	328	"Baby Won't You Tell Me"	Shankar–Ehsaan–Loy	Krishna Kanth	Shweta Mohan, Siddharth Mahadevan	
Sye Raa Narasimha Reddy	329	"Jaago Narasimhaa Jaagore"	Amit Trivedi	Sirivennela Sitaramasastri	Haricharan, Anurag Kulkarni	
Udyama Simham	330	"Neram O Manasa"	Dileep Bandari	C.H.Ramulu		
Yatra	331	"Nee Raaka Kosam"	K	Sirivennela Sitaramasastri		

=== 2020 ===
Film	No	Song	Composer(s)	Writer(s)	Co-artist(s)
Ala Vaikunthapurramuloo	332	"Title Song"(Theater Version)	Thaman S		
Sarileru Neekevvaru	333	"Sarileru Neekevvaru"	Devi Sri Prasad	Devi Sri Prasad	
Street Dancer 3D	334	"Hindustani"	Shankar–Ehsaan–Loy	Ramajogayya Sastry	

=== 2021 ===
Film	No	Song	Composer(s)	Writer(s)	Co-artist(s)
Vakeel Saab	335	"Sathyameva Jayathe"	Thaman S	Ramajogayya Sastry	
Ardha Shathabdam	336	"Arey Meriseley"	Nawfal Raja AIS	Rahman	
Akhanda	337	"Akhanda Title Song"	Thaman S	Ananta Sriram	Siddharth Mahadevan

=== 2022 ===
Film	No	Song	Composer(s)	Writer(s)	Co-singer(s)
Acharya	338	"Bhale Bhale Banjara"	Mani Sharma	Ramajogayya Sastry	Rahul Sipligunj
Ante Sundaraniki	339	"Thandanaananda"	Vivek Sagar	Ramajogayya Sastry	Shweta Mohan
Ranga Ranga Vaibhavanga	340	"Thelusa Thelusa"	Devi Sri Prasad	Sri Mani	
Alluri	341	"Vajrayudhame Neekendhukura"	Harshavardhan Rameshwar	Rambabu Goshala	
Ponniyin Selvan: I	342	"Raachasa Maavaya"	A. R. Rahman	Ananta Sriram	Shreya Ghoshal, Mahesh Vinayakram
Anukoni Prayanam	343	"Ye Kadhanu"	S Siva Dinavahi	Madhukiran Maddikunta	
Jetty	344	"Nishidhike"	Karthik Kodakandla	Mallavajjala Krishnaveni	
Alipiriki Allantha Dhooramlo	345	"Maa Tirupathi"	Phani Kalyan	Kittu Vissapragada	Ramya Behara
Weekend Party	346	"Harom Hara"	Sadha Chandra	Sadha Chandra	

=== 2023 ===
Film	No	Song	Composer(s)	Writer(s)	Co-singer(s)
Ponniyin Selvan: II	347	"Veera Raja Veera"	A. R. Rahman	Chandrabose	Chinmayi Sripaada
Miss. Shetty Mr. Polishetty	348	"Ye Vaipuku Saaguthondi"	Radhan	Ramajogayya Sastry	
Narakasura	349	"Greevamu Yandhuna"	Nawfal Raja AIS	Vaddepalli Krishna	

=== 2024 ===
Film	No	Song	Composer(s)	Writer(s)	Co-artist(s)
Lal Salaam	350	"Theru Jaathara"	A. R. Rahman	Rakendu Mouli	A. R. Reihana, Deepti Suresh, Bharath K Rajesh
Gaami	351	"Shivam"	Naresh Kumaran	Sri Mani	
Razakar	352	"Praanam Gaddiposa"	Bheems Ceciroleo	Suddala Ashok Teja	
Patang	354	"Hey Hello Namathe"	Jose Jimmy	Sri Mani	
Purushothamudu	355	"Yuddham Nadipina"	Gopi Sundar	Balaji	

=== 2025 ===
Film	No	Song	Composer(s)	Writer(s)	Co-artist(s)
Akhanda 2	356	"The Thaandavam"	Thaman S	Kalyan Chakravarthy	Kailash Kher, Deepak Blue
Eesha	357	"Isha Title Song"	RR Dhruvan	RR Dhruvan	
Tere Ishk Mein - (((D)))	358	"Chinnaware"	A. R. Rahman	Dhanush	

== Kannada film songs ==
=== 1990s ===
Year	Film	Song	Composer(s)	Writer(s)	Co-artist(s)
1999	Janumadatha	"Dennana Dennanaa"	V. Manohar		

=== 2000s ===
Year	Film	Song	Composer(s)	Writer(s)
2001	Grama Devathe	"Om Namah Shivaya"	Dhina	R. N. Jayagopal
2001	Sri Manjunatha	"Om Mahaprana Deepam"	Hamsalekha	Vedavyasa
2002	Appu	"Jolly Go Jolly Go"	Gurukiran	
2002	Dhumm	"Savaligu Kavaligu"	Gurukiran	V. Nagendra Prasad
2002	Ekangi	"Banna Bannada Loka"	V. Ravichandran	
2002	H_{2}O	Kandavideko Mamsavideko	Sadhu Kokila	Upendra
2002	Love You	"Love You Love You"	Gurukiran	
2002	Nandhi	Nakara Gikara	Gurukiran	V. Nagendra Prasad
2002	Ninagoskara	"Ninagoskara"	L. N. Shastri	
2002	Super Star	Thagole Thagole	Hamsalekha	Upendra
2003	Abhi	"Bitakku Guru"	Gurukiran	
2003	Chigurida Kanasu	"Singara Tene Teneyella"	V. Manohar	
2003	Don	"Kaveri Kandanu"	Sadhu Kokila	
2003	Excuse Me	"Preethige Janma"	R. P. Patnaik	
2003	Game	"Thala Dhimi Thaka"	Babji – Sandeep	
2003	Gokarna	"Baro Baro"	Gurukiran	
2003	Katthegalu Saar Katthegalu	"Lucky Lucky"	Hamsalekha	
2003	Kiccha	"Mankutimma Mankutimma"	Hamsalekha	
2003	Laali Haadu	"O Ushe"	Sadhu Kokila	K. Kalyan
2003	Mani	"Savira Nadigaligella"	Raja	K. Kalyan
2003	Partha	"Sankranthi"	Gurukiran	V. Nagendra Prasad
2003	Preethisale Beku	"Preethisale Beku"	Chaitanya	
2003	Sri Ram	"Ela Neene Thaaye"	Gurukiran	
2004	Bidalaare	"Angaiah Lingaiah"	Indhra	
2004	Chappale	"Chappale Thattu"	R. P. Patnaik	
2004	Kalasipalya	"Dhool Maga Dhool"	Sadhu Kokila	
2004	Kanchana Ganga	"Kill You"	S. A. Rajkumar	
2004	Monalisa	Chori Chori	Valisha-Sandeep	
2004	Rowdy Aliya	"Ivala Pose Nodu"	Vandemataram Srinivas, Koti	K. Kalyan
2004	Rowdy Aliya	"Jaya Jaya Shankari"	Vandemataram Srinivas, Koti	K. Kalyan
2004	Veera Kannadiga	"Addadalli Kingu Naanu"	Chakri	
2004	Veera Kannadiga	"Jeeva Kannada Deha Kannada"	Chakri	
2004	Y2K	"Udaaysu Neenu"	Sadhu Kokila	
2005	Gowramma	"Kolthalallappo"	S. A. Rajkumar	
2005	Inspector Jhansi	"Seere Seere"	Dilip Sen – Sameer Sen	
2005	Jogi	"Ello Jogappa"	Gurukiran	Prem
2005	Nammanna	"Hodi Hodi Jatka Gadi"	Gurukiran	Sriranga
2005	Rakshasa	"Reelu Illi Helodella"	Sadhu Kokila	
2005	Siddhu	"Nachu Nachu"	R. P. Patnaik	
2005	Vishnu Sena	"O Deva Neenilli"	Deva	Aadarsha
2006	7 O' Clock	"Kannige Kaanada"	M. S. Madhukar	K. Kalyan
2006	Ajay	"Rama Anta Krishna Anta"	Mani Sharma	
2006	Ambi	"Yede Halu"	V. Nagendra Prasad	
2006	Dattha	"Baare Baare"	R. P. Patnaik	V. Nagendra Prasad
2006	Gandugali Kumara Rama	"Kumara Rama"	Gurukiran	Shyamsundar
2006	Gopi	"Dum Dum Dholu"	Mani Sharma	
2006	Gopi	"Meleyu Ide"	Mani Sharma	
2006	Hatavadi	"Aata Hudugatavo"	V. Ravichandran	
2006	Hatavadi	"Yaaru Yaaru"	V. Ravichandran	
2006	Honeymoon Express	"Madhuvanthi"	R. P. Patnaik	
2006	Hubli	"Kannada Naadina"	A. R. Hemanth	
2006	Kallarali Hoovagi	"Hanatheya Adiyalle"	Hamsalekha	
2006	Madana	"Tentalli Titanic"	Yuvan Shankar Raja	V. Nagendra Prasad
2006	Mohini 9886788888	"Jwalamukhiya Haage"	Hamsalekha	
2006	Naaga	"Chiya Alibaba"	Venkat Narayan	
2006	Neenello Naanalle	"Sankranthi"	Ramesh Krishna	Kaviraj
2006	Preethigaagi	"Muddadthivi Guddadthivi"	S. A. Rajkumar	K. Kalyan
2006	Rama Chaitra Kaala	"Nee Jodi Dooraaka"	Shyam Sunder	
2006	Ravi Shashtry	"Vesha Vesha"	Rajesh Ramanath	
2006	Sevanthi Sevanthi	"Nodavalandaava"	S. A. Rajkumar	
2006	Shree	"Maayavi Maayavi"	Valisha – Sandeep	
2006	Thandege Thakka Maga	"Dum Dama Dum Dama"	S. A. Rajkumar	V. Nagendra Prasad
2006	Uppi Dada M.B.B.S.	"Gadi Bidi"	R. P. Patnaik	
2007	Bhoopathi	"Se Se Se Nanna"	V. Harikrishna	
2007	Ee Preethi Yeke Bhoomi Melide	"Sulle Sullu"	R. P. Patnaik	
2007	Ee Preethi Yeke Bhoomi Melide	"Barayya Barayya"	R. P. Patnaik	
2007	Geleya	"Chaangu Balaa Changure"	Mano Murthy	
2007	Krishna	"Hey Mouna"	V. Harikrishna	
2007	Lava Kusha	"Chindi Chindi"	Gurukiran	
2007	Masti	"Kolumande"	Gurukiran	
2007	Parodi	"Cool Drinksu"	Rajesh Ramanath	
2007	Thayiya Madilu	"Aparanji"	S. A. Rajkumar	
2007	Ugadi	"Dhin Dhinak"	R. P. Patnaik	Kaviraj
2008	Arjun	"Ye Kanaka"	V. Harikrishna	
2008	Athmeeya	"Aa Bili Bili Modona"	Manoj George	
2008	Athmeeya	"Aa Bili Bili Modona"(Remix)	Manoj George	
2008	Baba	"Surya Chandra"	Arjun Janya	
2008	Baba	"Nanna Preethi"	Arjun Janya	
2008	Gaja	"Aithalakkadi"	V. Harikrishna	
2008	Gnana Jyothi Sri Siddaganga	"Jeevake Jeeva"	K Yuvaraj	
2008	Gnana Jyothi Sri Siddaganga	"Yenna Pranadolage"	K Yuvaraj	
2008	Gooli	"Dealige Dealu"	Anoop Seelin	
2008	Indra	"Daari Bidi"	V. Harikrishna	
2008	Kaamannana Makkalu	"Mungaru Male"	Vidyasagar	V. Nagendra Prasad
2008	Marujanma	"Nanna Olavina"	Sri Murali	
2008	Meravanige	"Endendu Active Aagi"	V. Manohar	
2008	Neene Neene	"Mobile Mobile"	Sri Murali	
2008	Paramesha Panwala	"Madaraasu Aisa"	V. Harikrishna	V. Nagendra Prasad
2008	Patre Loves Padma	"Novina Butti"	Arjun Janya	
2008	Premigagi Naa	"Appi Thappi"	Rajesh Ramanath	
2008	Satya in Love	"Banda Kole Basava"	Gurukiran	Malavalli Saikrishna
2008	Varasdhaara	"Ee Thaayinaadina"	Rajesh Ramanath	
2008	Varasdhaara	"Nyayada Geluvige"	Rajesh Ramanath	
2008	Varasdhaara	"Aa Nondavaranu"	Rajesh Ramanath	
2009	Abhimaani	"Antharalada"	Dharmateja	
2009	Baaji	"Vandemaatharam"	GR Shankar	
2009	Birugaali	"Macchi Sacchi"	Arjun Janya	Shivananje Gowda
2009	Chamkaisi Chindi Udaisi	"Colour Colour Duniya"	PB Balaji	
2009	Cheluvina Chilipi	"Ninna Prashneyu Ninade"	Mickey J. Meyer	
2009	Devaru Kotta Thangi	"Devaru Kotta Thangi"	Hamsalekha	
2009	Kabaddi	"Toltede"	Hamsalekha	
2009	Kalaakaar	"Aaya Aaya Superstar"	Giridhar Diwan	
2009	Machchaa	"Songu Shuru Dancu Shuru"	Arjun Janya	
2009	Meghave Meghave	"Aa Surya Bandaga"	V. Harikrishna	
2009	Ninagagi Kadiruve	"Rampam Rangina"	Robin Gurung	
2009	Preethse Preethse	"Urige Baare"	Anoop Seelin	
2009	Raaj the Showman	"Muthuraja"	V. Harikrishna	V. Nagendra Prasad
2009	Shivamani	"Shivamani Title Song"	Veer Samarth	
2009	Veera Madakari	"Dummare Dumma"	M. M. Keeravani	Shridhar

=== 2010s ===
Year	Film	Song	Composer(s)	Writer(s)	Co-artist(s)
2010	Appu and Pappu	"Anjani"	Hamsalekha		
2010	Gangleader	"Chinthamani"	Abhimann Roy		
2010	Hrudayadhalli Idhenidhu	"Thampaada Gaali"	Dharma Prakash		
2010	Mylari	"Jagginakka Jagginakka"	Gurukiran	Kaviraj	
2010	Nanjangud Nanjuda	"Yellu Bannada Chitte"	K V Ravichandran		
2010	Sihigaali	"Ranne Ranne"	G R Shankar		
2010	Vaare Vah	"Athmeeya Manase"	Avinash Vishwajith		
2010	Veera Parampare	"Yethathalo Maaya"	S. Narayan		
2010	Veera Parampare	"Nanna Mannidu"	S. Narayan		
2010	Yaare Nee Devathe	"Usiraguve Naanu"	Venkat Narayan		
2011	Boss	"Ninthare Naanu"	V. Harikrishna	V. Nagendra Prasad	
2011	Boss	"Muttatheeni Thattatheeni"	V. Harikrishna	V. Nagendra Prasad	Shamitha Malnad
2011	Ee Sanje	"Hrudayaana Kelu"	Jai Shiva		
2011	Hudugaru	"Shambo Shiva Shambo"	V. Harikrishna		
2011	Hori	"Ee Beauty Bhoomi"	Renukumar		
2011	I Am Sorry Mathe Banni Preethsona	"Subhan Allah Re"	Anoop Seelin		
2011	Ishta	"Khsame Endharenu"	Indrani Chabria		
2011	Jogayya	"Gangeye Avana"	V. Harikrishna		
2011	Kalla Malla Sulla	"Elliruve Kusbhoo"	Alex Paul		
2011	Kempe Gowda	"Sri Rama Jaya Rama"	Arjun Janya		
2011	Olave Mandara	"Janapada Kanmare"	Deva		
2011	Prema Chandrama	"Ondanondu"	V. Harikrishna		
2011	Prince	"Karnataka Bumper"	V. Harikrishna	V. Nagendra Prasad	Anuradha Sriram
2011	Saarathi	"Kai Mugidhu Yeru"	V. Harikrishna	V. Nagendra Prasad	
2011	Saarathi	"Kittappa Kittappa"	V. Harikrishna	V. Nagendra Prasad	
2011	Taare	"Ragarangina Snageetha"	CR Bobby	V. Nagendra Prasad	
2011	Vinayaka Geleyara Balaga	"Vakeatunda Mahakaya"	V. Harikrishna	V. Nagendra Prasad	
2011	Vishnuvardhana	"Nam Routealli"	V. Harikrishna		
2012	Kalpana	"Nillu Maga Nillu Maga"	V. Harikrishna		
2012	Kiladi Kitty	"Naave Maharajaru"	Jassie Gift	V. Srikanth	
2012	Prem Adda	"Adda Boys"	V. Harikrishna	Tushar Ranganath	
2012	Rambo	"Jaya Jaya Jackettu"	Arjun Janya	Kaviraj	
2012	Sangolli Rayanna	"Gandu Mettida"	Yashovardhan		
2012	Sangolli Rayanna	"Janani Janmabhoomi"	Yashovardhan		
2013	Andhar Bahar	"Koneye Irada"	Vijay Prakash		
2013	Bangari	"Jaimande Madesha"	A. M. Need		
2013	Bhajarangi	"Jai Bhajarangi"	Arjun Janya		
2013	Brindavana	"Thangali"	V. Harikrishna		
2013	Chaddi Dosth	"Avlu Nakku Bitre"	Arjun Janya		
2013	Dilwala	"Jaadho"	Arjun Janya	Anand Priya	Shreya Ghoshal
2013	Jataayu	"Kabaddi Kabaddi"	Vinay Chandra		
2013	Mandahasa	"Naada Omkaara"	Veer Samarth		
2013	Pade Pade	"Vande Maatharam"	Sathish Aryan		
2013	Pade Pade	"Neenene Oho Neenene"	Sathish Aryan		
2013	Parari (2013 film)	"Paraari"	Anoop Seelin		
2013	Raja Huli	"Om Hindu Guruthu"	Hamsalekha		
2014	Agraja	"Big Boss"(Version l)	Nandan Raj		
2014	Agraja	"Big Boss"(Version ll)	Nandan Raj		
2014	Belli	"Dhoom Dhamaka"	V. Sridhar		
2014	Gajakesari	"Kannada Siri"	V. Harikrishna		
2014	Jai Lalitha	"Sadarame"	V. Sridhar		
2014	Khaidi	"O Devare"(Version l)	Justin Udhay		
2014	Khaidi	"O Devare"(Version ll)	Justin Udhay		
2014	Maanikya	"Jeeva Jeeva"	Arjun Janya		
2014	Maanikya	"Belake Belake"	Arjun Janya		
2014	Neenade Naa	"Byandu Baaja"	Arjun Janya		
2014	Simhadri	"Thingalu Mulugidavu"	Arjun Janya		
2014	Ulidavaru Kandanthe	"Kanna Muchhe"	B. Ajaneesh Loknath	Suni	Vani Harikrishna
2014	Ambareesha	"Vaaleekkum"	V. Harikrishna		
2015	DK	"Besari Marada"	Arjun Janya		
2015	Om Namaha	"Preethine Hinge"	Arjun Janya		
2015	Red Alert	"Jai Jai Ganesha"	Ravivarma		
2015	Red Alert	"Jai Jai Theme"	Ravivarma		
2015	Rudra Tandava	"Ee Baala Belago"	V. Harikrishna		
2015	Rudra Tandava	"Shantha Shivane"	V. Harikrishna		
2015	Vajrakaya	"Vajrakaya"	Arjun Janya		
2015	Vascodigama	"Goli Hodi"	Poornachandra Tejaswi		
2016	Danger Zone	"Srigandha Devathe"	Sathish Aryan		
2016	Kalpana 2	"Muneshwara"	Arjun Janya	V. Nagendra Prasad	
2016	Kotigobba 2	"Parapanche Nene"	D. Imman		
2016	Madha Mathu Manasi	"Omme Nanna Nodu"	Mano Murthy	Sathish Pradhan	
2016	Mukunda Murari	"Mukunda Murari"	Arjun Janya	V. Nagendra Prasad	
2016	Naani	"Mruthyunjaya"	M S Thyagaraju		
2016	Nagarahavu	"Aledaado Megha"	Gurukiran	Kaviraj	Indu Nagaraj
2017	Ajaramara	"Maya Mrugave"	Rajkishor Rao		
2017	Allama	"Kaalugaleradu Gaali Kandayya"	Bapu Padmanabha		
2017	Allama	"Agniya Sudivalli"	Bapu Padmanabha		
2017	Allama	"Ettana Maamara"	Bapu Padmanabha		
2017	Allama	"Sutthi Sutthi Bandhadilla"	Bapu Padmanabha		
2017	Eradu Kanasu	"E Oorige Oore"	Steve – Kaushik		
2017	Samyuktha 2	"Swargavendare"	K V Ravichandran		
2017	Tiger	"Ganapathi Jai"	Arjun Janya		
2018	The Villain	"I am Villain"	Arjun Janya	Prem	
2019	Girgitle	"Padey Padey"	Leo Peters		
2019	Sye Raa Narasimha Reddy	"Jaago Narasimha Jagore"	Amit Trivedi	Azad Varada Raj	Anurag Kulkarni, Haricharan
2019	Savarna Deergha Sandhi	"SDS Club Mix"	Mano Murthy		
2019	Savarna Deergha Sandhi	"Savarna Deeraga Sandi"	Mano Murthy		

=== 2020s ===
Year	Film	Song	Composer(s)	Writer(s)	Co-singer(s)
2020	Sri Bharatha Baahubali	"Ittare Saganiyaade"	Manikanth Kadri	Manju Maandavya	
2021	Roberrt	"Jai Shri Ram"	Arjun Janya	V. Nagendra Prasad	
2021	Bhajarangi 2	"Bajare Bajare"	Arjun Janya	V. Nagendra Prasad	
2022	Ek Love Ya	"Anitha Anitha"	Arjun Janya	Sharanakumar Gajendragada	
2022	Manasmita	"Neela Megha"	Harikaavya	Manju M Doddamani	
2022	Manasmita	"Manamadiradi"	Harikaavya	Harikaavya	
2023	Praja Rajya	"Jagadali Raithanemba"	Vijetha Manjaiah	V. Nagendra Prasad	
2023	Prabhutva	"Nayaka Jananayaka"	Emil Mohammed	Chethan Kumar P	
2023	Present Prapancha 0% Love	"Swargavendare"	K V Ravichandra		
2024	Karataka Damanaka	"Title Song"	V. Harikrishna	Yogaraj Bhat	
2026	America America 2	"Run Run!"	Mano Murthy	Nagathihalli Chandrashekar	Shreya Ghoshal

== Malayalam film songs ==
Year	Film	Song	Composer(s)	Writer(s)	Co-artist(s)
2000	Dreamz	"Pakkala Paadan Vaa"	Vidyasagar	Gireesh Puthenchery	
2000	Sathyameva Jayathe	"Dhak Dhak"	M. Jayachandran	Kaithapram	
2000	Sathyam Sivam Sundaram	"Angakale"	Vidyasagar	Kaithapram	
2002	Meesa Madhavan	"Chingamaasam Vannu Chernaal"	Vidyasagar	Gireesh Puthenchery	Rimi Tomy
2003	Vellithira	"Pachcha Maanga"	Alphonse Joseph	Shibu Chakravarthy	K. S. Chithra
2004	Rasikan	"Dalavaatheruvile"	Vidyasagar	Gireesh Puthenchery	
2004	Manju Poloru Penkutty	"Kashmera Sandhye"	Alphonse Joseph	Kaithapram	Ganga Sitharasu
2004	Manju Poloru Penkutty	"Kashmera Sandye (m)"	Alphonse Joseph	Kaithapram	
2005	5 Fingers	"Thinkal Pottu"	Benny Johnson	Sachithanandan Puzhankara	
2005	Udayon	"Angethala"	Ouseppachan	Gireesh Puthenchery	Mohanlal, Ganga, Kalidas
2006	Lakshmi (D)	"Hey Sathyabhama"	Ramana Gogula	Rajeev Alunkal	Manjari, Jassie Gift
2007	Chotta Mumbai	"Adithadakal Padichavanalla"	Rahul Raj	Vayalar Sarath Chandra Varma	Arjun Sasi, Sangeeth, Sreelakshmi, Sreeraj Saji
2007	Happy Days (D)	"Vidachollan"	Mickey J Meyer	Rajeev Alunkal	Manjari
2008	Shakespeare M.A. Malayalam	"Neram Poy"	Mohan Sithara		Afsal, Mohan Sithara
2008	Madampi	"Kalyanakacheri"	M. Jayachandran	Gireesh Puthenchery	M. Jayachandran
2008	Crazy Gopalan	"Gopala Gokulapala"	Rahul Raj	Anil Panachooran	
2008	Thirakkatha	"Onnondonnu Chernu"	Sharreth	Rafeeq Ahamed	Ranjini Haridas
2008	Twenty:20	"Oh Priya"	Suresh Peters	Gireesh Puthenchery	Jyotsna Radhakrishnan
2009	Puthiya Mukham	"Picha Vacha Naal"	Deepak Dev	Kaithapram	Sunita Menon
2009	Vairam: Fight for Justice	"Nattu Paattu Ketto"	M. Jayachandran	Gireesh Puthenchery	
2009	Meghatheertham	"Maayunnu Pakal"	Sharreth	Gireesh Puthenchery	
2010	Avan	"Mahathe Nilppu"	Anil Gopalan	OS Unnikrishnan	
2010	College Days	"Jaganu Jaganu Thaka"	Ronnie Raphael		
2010	Thanthonni	"Periya Thevare"	Thej Mervin	Giressh Puthenchery	Sayanora Philip
2010	Shikkar	"Sembakame1"	M. Jayachandran	Gireesh Puthenchery	Malathy Lakshman
2010	Four Friends	"Yeh Dosti"	M. Jayachandran	Anand Bakshi	Udit Narayan
2010	Holidays	"Indhumukhee Varumo"	Alex Paul	Kaithapram	
2010	Best Actor	"Machuva Eri"	Bijibal	Santhosh Varma	
2010	Marykkundoru Kunjaadu	"Enttadukke"	Berny–Ignatius	Anil Panachooran	Rimi Tomy, Pappukutty Bhagavathar, Subbalakshmi
2010	Sakudumbam Shyamala	"Nakkadichu Pattupaadi"	M. G. Sreekumar	Vayalar Sarath Chandra Varma	Suraj Venjaramoodu
2011	Ithu Nammude Katha	"Anuraagam Mannil"	Sundar C Babu	Santhosh Varma	
2011	Mohabbath	"Ente Padachavane"	S. Balakrishnan	Vayalar Sarath Chandra Varma	Afsal
2011	Christian Brothers	"Karthaave"	Deepak Dev	Kaithapram	Rimi Tomy
2011	Christian Brothers	"Sayyave"	Deepak Dev	Kaithapram	Shweta Mohan
2011	Christian Brothers	"Kannum"	Deepak Dev	Kaithapram	Shweta Mohan
2011	Uppukandam Brothers Back in Action	"Thilakam Vacha"	Alphonse Joseph	Asha Ramesh	
2011	Uppukandam Brothers Back in Action	"Thilakam Vacha (remix)"	Alphonse Joseph	Asha Ramesh	
2011	Veeraputhran	"Thudare Maddalavum"	Ramesh Narayan	Moinkutty Vaidyar	
2011	Adaminte Makan Abu	"Makka Madeenathil"	Ramesh Narayan	Rafeeq Ahamed	Ramesh Narayan
2011	Kadhayile Nayika	"En Kanne"	Thej Mervin	Shibu Chakravarthy	
2012	Shikari	"Va Va Vaa Veera"	Harikrishna	Murukan Kattakada	
2012	Mallu Singh	"Rab Rab Rab"	M. Jayachandran	Murukan Kattakada	Sithara Krishnakumar
2012	Padmavyooham	"Brahmaprabhavame"	Sanjeev Krishnan	Suku Maruthathoor	
2012	Sound Thoma	"Kanni Penne"	Gopi Sundar	Murukan Kattakada	Rimi Tomy
2013	KQ	"Chundathe"	Stephen Devassy	Rafeeq Ahamed	Shyam
2013	Proprietors: Kammath & Kammath	"Dosha Nalla Dosha"	M. Jayachandran	Santhosh Varma	M. Jayachandran, Nikhil Raj
2013	Pullipulikalum Aattinkuttiyum	"Ottathumpi"	Vidyasagar	Vayalar Sarath Chandra Varma	K. S. Chithra
2013	Bicycle Thieves	"Punchiri Thanchum"	Deepak Dev	Kaithapram	
2014	1983	"Nenjile Nenjile"	Gopi Sundar		
2014	Mr. Fraud	"Poonthinkale"	Gopi Sundar	Chitoor Gopi	Sakthisree Gopalan
2014	Mr. Fraud	"Khuda Woh Khuda"	Gopi Sundar	B. K. Harinarayanan	
2014	Ring Master	"Diana"	Gopi Sundar	B. K. Harinarayanan	
2014	Ring Master	"Kannimasam"	Gopi Sundar	Nadirshah	
2014	To Noora with Love	"Pira Nee"	Mohan Sithara	Vayalar Sarath Chandra Varma	
2014	Avatharam	"Konchi Konchi Chirichaal"	Deepak Dev	Kaithapram	Rimi Tomy
2014	Aamayum Muyalum	"Ponnin Kilukilukkam"	M. G. Sreekumar	Vinu Sreelakam	
2015	Kunjiramayanam	"Thumbappoove Sundaree"	Justin Prabhakaran	Manu Manjith	
2015	Saigal Paadukayaanu	"Kanne Kannin Maniye"	M. Jayachandran	Rafeeq Ahamed	M. Jayachandran, Ramesh Narayan
2015	High Alert	"Jai Jai Ganesha" "Jai Jai Ganesha Theme"	M. R. Ravivarma	Jayan Raghavan	
2015	Lavender				
2016	Welcome to Central Jail	"Sundari"	Nadirshah	Vayalar Sarath Chandra Varma	
2016	Kochavva Paulo Ayyappa Coelho	"Vaanam Mele"	Sooraj S. Kurup	Sooraj S. Kurup	
2016	Kattappanayile Rithwik Roshan	"Minnaminnikkum"	Nadirshah	Santhosh Varma	
2018	Odiyan	"Nenjile"	M. Jayachandran	Lakshmi Shrikumar	
2018	Meezan	"Mubtali Illa"	4 Musics	S. V. Cheriyan	
2018	Panchavarnathatha	"Varika Rasika"	Nadirshah	Santhosh Varma	
2019	Ambili	"Nenchakame"	Vishnu Vijay		
2019	Ambili	"Nenchakame"(Into The Roots)	Vishnu Vijay		
2019	Chila New Gen Nattuviseshangal	"Suraamgana"	M. Jayachandran	Santhosh Varma	
2019	Munthiri Monchan: Oru Thavala Paranja Kadha	"Orkkunnu Njana"	Vijith Nambiar	Rafeeq Ahamed	
2019	Saaho (D)	Baby Won't You Tell Me	Shankar–Ehsaan–Loy	Vinayak Sasikumar	Shweta Mohan
2019	Ittymaani: Made in China	"Kunjade Ninte Manassil"	4 Musics	Santhosh Varma	Biby Mathew 4 Musics, Sulfique, Devika Soorya Prakash, Vrinda Shameek Ghosh, Haritha Balakrishnan, Additional Vocals: Jim Jacob 4 Musics, Anjali Surendran
2019	Sye Raa Narasimha Reddy (Dubbed Version)	Unaroo Narasimhapperumaale	Amit Trivedi	Siju Thuravoor	Anurag Kulkarni, Haricharan
2021	Djibouti	"Vinninazhake Kanninithale"	Deepak Dev		
2021	One	"Janamanassin"	Gopi Sundar		
2021	Oru Thathvika Avalokanam	"Aana Poloru"	O K Ravi Shankar		
2023	2018	"Minnal Minnane"	Nobin Paul		
2023	Regina	"Orro Mozhi"	Sathish Nair		
2023	Bandra	"Rakka Rakka"	Sam C. S.		

== Marathi film songs ==
Year	Film	Song	Composer(s)	Writer(s)	Co-artist(s)
2004	Aga Bai Arrecha!	"Mann Udhaan Varyache"	Ajay–Atul		
2005	Sarivar Sari	"Kanth Aani Aabhal"	Bhaskar Chandavarkar		
2007	Bandh Premache	"Chimbh Bhijalele"	Ajay-Atul		
2008	Sakhi	"Jhali Punha"(Male)	Ashok Patki		
2008	Amhi Satpute	"Sone Paijana"	Jitendra Kulkarni		
2008	Ek Daav Sansaracha	"Ek Daav Sansaracha"	Ashok Patki		
2008	Ek Daav Sansaracha	"Rimzim Sukh"	Ashok Patki		
2009	Samaantar	"Nuste Nuste"(Duet)	Anand Modak		Shreya Ghoshal
2009	Samaantar	"Kai Jahale Tula Mane"	Anand Modak		Shreya Ghoshal
2009	Samaantar	"Nuste Nuste"(Male)	Anand Modak		
2010	Jetaa	"Ya Sukhano Ya"(Male)	Vaishali Samant		
2010	Most Wanted	"Are Godhe Pe Sawar"	Rajan Prabhu		
2010	Most Wanted	"Tya Pahatechi"(Version l)	Rajan Prabhu		
2010	Most Wanted	"Tya Pahatechi"(Version ll)	Rajan Prabhu		
2010	Ved Laavi Jeeva	"Sakhya Re"	Bapi–Tutul		
2011	Gajaar: Journey of the Soul	"Pay Kuthe Chalale"	Shailendra Barve		
2011	Balgandharva	"Parvardigar"	Kaushal Inamdar		Anand Bhate
2011	Rajmata Jijau	"Bhagvya Zendyachya"	Shashank Powar		Chorus
2011	Superstar	"Dum Dumak Dum Dumak"	Ajit Sameer		
2012	Kashala Udyachi Baat	"Man Vede"	Salil Kulkarni		Hariharan
2012	Kashala Udyachi Baat	"Man Vede"(Reprsie)	Salil Kulkarni		Hariharan
2012	Satrangi Re	"Walnavari Jarase"	Ajay Naik		
2012	Yedyanchi Jatra	"Uthale Vadal"	Kshitij Wagh	Guru Thakur	Mahesh Raut
2012	Hridayanath	"Payala Naman"	Santosh Mulekar		
2012	Hridayanath	"Payala Naman"(Slow)	Santosh Mulekar		
2012	Swapna Tujhe Ni Majhe	"Parmeshwara Saath De"	Siddharth Mahadevan		
2013	Antar	"Taal Taal"	Apeksha Dandekar		
2013	Antar	"Themb Themb"	Apeksha Dandekar		
2013	Lagna Pahave Karun	"Majhya Mana"	Ajay Naik	Vaibhav Joshi	
2013	Konkanasta	"Konkanasta Theme Song"	Akshya Hariharan		
2013	Govinda	"Morya"	Rohan Pradhan		
2014	Rama Madhav	"Ganapati Aarti"	Anand Modak		
2014	Anvatt	"Tarun Aahe Ratra Ajunahi"	Shankar–Ehsaan–Loy		Sapna Pathak
2014	Poshter Boyz	"Kshan Hey"	Lesle Lewis		
2014	Vitti Dandu	"Bheduni Hi Jau (Vande Mataram)	Santhosh Mulekar		Anvesha
2014	Aashiyana	"Saibaba Aarati"	Prabhakar Narwade		
2014	Dusari Goshta	"Khelnare Haat Pai"	Ashok Patki		Vidit, Pallavi
2015	Siddhant	"Chavi Chavi Ne"	Shailendra Barve		
2015	Siddhant	"Thode Se Ahe"	Shailendra Barve		
2015	Rajwade and Sons	"Mokale"	Debarpito		
2015	Nagrik	"Dhaklat"	Tubby Parik, Shambaji		
2015	Nagrik	"Kon Apan"	Tubby Parik, Shambaji		
2015	Dabba Ais Pais	"Pasayadaan"	Shrihari Vaze		
2015	Katyar Kaljat Ghusali	"Sur Niragas Ho"	Mangesh Kangane		Anandi Joshi, Chorus
2015	Katyar Kaljat Ghusali	"Din Geledagger"	Jitendra Abhisheki	Purushottam Darvhekar	
2015	Katyar Kaljat Ghusali	"Ghei Chhand Makarand I"	Jitendra Abhisheki	Purushottam Darvhekar	
2015	Katyar Kaljat Ghusali	"Muralidhar Shyamdagger"	Jitendra Abhisheki	Purushottam Darvhekar	
2015	Katyar Kaljat Ghusali	"Tejonidhi Lohagoldagger"	Jitendra Abhisheki	Purushottam Darvhekar	
2015	Katyar Kaljat Ghusali	"Man Mandira I"	Shankar–Ehsaan–Loy	Mandar Cholkar	
2015	Mitwaa	"Mitwaa"	Shankar–Ehsaan–Loy		Janhavi Prabhu
2015	Kaakan	"Kaakan Title song"	Ajay Singha		Neha Rajpal
2015	Dhol Taashe	"Devaraya"	Nilesh Moharir		
2015	Dhol Taashe	"Devaraya"(Reprise)	Nilesh Moharir		
2015	Aga Bai Arechyaa 2	"Jagnyache Bhaan He"	Nishaad	Ashwini Shende	
2015	Than Than Gopal	"Vaare"	Simaab Sen		
2015	Partu	"Kon Kuthla"	Shashank Powar		
2015	Lokmanya: Ek Yugpurush	"Ya Jeevan Aaple"	Ajit Sameer		
2015	Lokmanya: Ek Yugpurush	"Gajananaa Gajananaa"	Ajit Sameer		
2018	Hostel Days	"Maitri"	Ajay Naik		
2018	Youngraad	"Goth Ramachi"	Hriday Gattani	Datta Patil	
2018	Memory Card	"The Bappa Song"	Mitesh Pritesh		
2018	Pari Hoon Main	"Vege Vege Dhau"	Samir Saptiskar		
2019	Mogra Phulaalaa	"Mogra Phulaalaa"	Rohit Shyam Raut	Abhishek Khankar	
2019	Kulkarni Chaukatla Deshpande	"Aabhalachya Gavala"(Repsrise)	Soumil Siddarth		
2021	Basta	"Mangalashtaka"	Santosh Mulekar		
2021	Basta	"Lagin Gunha Jhala"	Santosh Mulekar		
2021	Preetam	"Tuzya Rupacha"	Viswajith CT		
2022	Ekda Kaay Zala	"Re Kshana"	Saleel Kulkarni		
2022	Ekda Kaay Zala	"Re Kshana"(Unplugged)	Saleel Kulkarni		
2022	Har Har Mahadev	"Har Har Mahadev"	Hitesh Modak		
2022	Goshta Eka Paithanichi	"Bahar Aala"	Manik Ganesh		
2023	Ahilya Zunj Ekaki	"Tu Chal"	Pravin Kuwar		
2023	Ahilya Zunj Ekaki	"Tu Chal"(Version ll)	Pravin Kuwar		
2023	Gettogether	"Vata Ka Dur Jatai"	Ajay Ranpise		
2023	Diary Of Vinayak Pandit	"Datala Umhala"	Niranjan Pedgaonkar		
2024	Ole Aale	"Angai"	Sachin–Jigar	Mandar Cholkar	
2025	Dhaap	"Maula mere Maula"	Ashish Hadawale and Sarvesh Muni	Yogesh Baban Gadage	Solo

== Tulu songs ==
Year	Film	Song	Composer(s)	Writer(s)	Co-artist(s)
2014	Rickshaw Driver	"Jai Tulunadu"	Wahab Salim		
2017	Ambar Caterers	"Jai Hanuman"	Manikanth Kadri	Vijaykumar Kodialbail	

== Punjabi songs ==
Year	Film	Song	Composer(s)	Writer(s)	Co-artist(s)
2025	Akaal: The Unconquered	"Kan, Kan"	Shankar-Ehsaan-Loy	Happy Raikoti	Shreya Ghoshal

== Non-film songs ==
=== Album ===
Year	Album(s)	Song	Composer(s)	Writer(s)	Co-artist(s)
1997	Mohabbat Kar Le	"Mohabbat Kar Le"	Ram Sampath	Tarun Anand, Nitin Raikwar	Shiamak Davar
1997	Mohabbat Kar Le	"Come on Raju"	Shiamak Davar	Bharat Dhabholkar	Shiamak Davar
1998	Breathless	All Songs	Shankar Mahadevan	Javed Akhtar	—N/a
2003	Nine	All Songs	Shankar Mahadevan	Javed Akhtar	—N/a

=== Singles ===
Year	Song	Composer(s)	Writer(s)	Co-artist(s)
1997	Aye Chalnewale Raah Mein	Shankar Mahadevan		Solo

=== Television title songs ===
- 1999: "Nimmathi Ungal Choice-Part II Manasatchi" (Tamil)
- 2000: "Vaazhkai" (Tamil)
- 2008: "Shivasakthi" (duet with Swetha Mohan) (Tamil)
- 2023: "Bhoomige Banda Bhagavantha" (Kannada)
