= Ishta (film) =

- Directed by: R P Krishna
- Produced by: Vijaykumar T Chabriya
- Starring: Santhosh; Bhoomika V Chabriya
- Cinematography: C S Mahadev
- Edited by: Sree (Crazy Mindz)
- Music by: Indrani V Chabriya
- Release date: October 21, 2011
- Country: India
- Language: Kannada

Ishta (English: Liking) is a 2011 Kannada-language romance film directed by R.P. Krishna and produced by RMV Combines. The film is Bhoomika Chabria's and Santosh Swarbi's debut film. The film was released on 21 October 2011.

== Cast ==
- Santhosh as Krishna
- Bhoomika as Nanda
- Ravi Teja as Ravi
- Honnavalli Krishna
- Shivaram
- Karibasavaiah

== Reception ==
=== Critical response ===
A critic from The New Indian Express wrote "The main disadvantage is the absence of humour which is required to break the monotony. The scene where Honnavalli Krishna attempts to enter a temple premises in an inebriated condition fails to impress even the front benchers. All in all, one needs a lot of patience to watch this flick". B S Srivani from Deccan Herald wrote "Santosh, with already a few films under the belt, is good as Bandi Krishna. Bhoomika takes a while to grow on the audience, but projects hauteur very well. Someone with a more mature voice would have helped her performance.Ishta starts off with immense potential only to fritter it all away at the altar of commercial requirement". A critic from News18 India wrote "The supporting cast is equally mediocre. Technical work is below average except for the background score which is fairly decent. 'Ishta' could have been a pleasing film but the director's haphazard work spoils the show".
