= Suman filmography =

Suman is an Indian actor who works predominantly in Telugu and Tamil. He also featured in few Kannada, Malayalam and Hindi films.

== Films ==
List of Suman film credits
Year	Title	Role	Language	Notes	Ref.
1978	Karunai Ullam		Tamil		
1979	Neechal Kulam		Tamil		
1979	Veettukku Veedu Vasappadi	Mohan	Tamil		
1980	Ilamai Kolam		Tamil		
1981	Thee	Ravi	Tamil		
1981	Kadal Meengal	Sekhar	Tamil		
1981	Nallathu Nadanthey Theerum		Tamil		
1981	Vaadagai Veedu		Tamil		
1981	Enakkaga Kaathiru		Tamil		
1981	Aradhanai		Tamil		
1981	Anjatha Nenjangal		Tamil		
1981	Ellam Inba Mayyam	Mohan	Tamil		
1982	Iddharu Kiladelu		Telugu		
1982	Tarangini		Telugu		
1982	Avanukku Nigar Avane		Tamil		
1982	Darling, Darling, Darling	Ashok	Tamil		
1983	Aparadhi ?		Telugu		
1983	Neti Bharatham		Telugu		
1983	Chandirani		Telugu		
1983	Sattathukku Oru Saval		Tamil		
1983	Navodhayam		Telugu		
1983	Kodalu Kaavali		Telugu		
1983	Samsaram Enbathu Veenai		Tamil		
1983	Vasanthame Varuga		Tamil		
1983	Kalyana Veena		Telugu		
1983	Thriveni Sangamam		Telugu		
1984	Ee Charithra Inkennallu	Inspector Bharat Kumar	Telugu		
1984	Merupu Daadi	Raja	Telugu		
1984	Eduruleni Monagallu	Prathap	Telugu		
1984	Daku	Vijay	Telugu		
1984	Pannendu Suthralu		Telugu		
1984	Raraju		Telugu		
1984	Pralaya Simham	Raja	Telugu		
1984	Sitaara	Raju	Telugu		
1984	James Bond 999	Vijay aka James Bond 999	Telugu		
1985	Nyayam Meere Cheppali	Prabhakar	Telugu		
1985	America Alludu	Dr. Raju	Telugu		
1985	En Selvame		Tamil		
1985	Darja Donga		Telugu		
1985	Musugu Donga	Ravi	Telugu		
1985	Kanchu Kavacham		Telugu		
1985	Garjana	Shyamprasad/Danger Ramudu	Telugu		
1985	Dongallo Dora		Telugu		
1985	Mayadari Maridhi		Telugu		
1985	Mangalya Bandham		Telugu		
1986	Iddaru Mithrulu	Suman	Telugu		
1986	Maruthi		Telugu		
1986	Samajamlo Sthree		Telugu		
1986	Srimathi Kanuka		Telugu		
1986	Chadastapu Mogudu		Telugu		
1987	Prema Samrat	Madanagopal	Telugu		
1987	Dharmapatni		Telugu		
1988	Bandipotu	Aswatthama	Telugu		
1988	Ukkusankellu		Telugu		
1988	Ugra Nethrudu	Ravi Teja	Telugu		
1989	Raktha Kanneeru	Chakravarthy and Vittal	Telugu		
1989	Neram Nadi Kadu		Telugu		
1989	Jayammu Nischayammu Raa		Telugu	Cameo	
1989	Palnati Rudraiah	Rudrama Nayudu	Telugu		
1990	Kondaveeti Rowdy		Telugu		
1990	Qaidi Dada		Telugu		
1990	Rao Gari Intlo Rowdy		Telugu		
1990	Aathma Bhandham		Telugu		
1990	Sahasa Putrudu		Telugu		
1990	Iravayyava shathabdam		Telugu		
1990	Neti Charitra		Telugu		
1991	Peddinti Alludu	Raja	Telugu		
1991	Bhargav		Telugu		
1991	Mahayagnam		Telugu		
1991	Ramudu Kadhu Rakshasudu		Telugu		
1992	Yamudannaki Mogudu		Telugu		
1992	Pattudala		Telugu		
1992	Alexander	Alexander	Telugu		
1992	Chakravyuham		Telugu		
1992	Collector Gari Alludu		Telugu		
1992	Mondi Mogudu Penki Pellam		Telugu		
1993	Paruvu Prathishta		Telugu		
1993	Nakshatra Poratam		Telugu		
1993	Bhagath	Bhagath	Telugu		
1993	Rendilla Poojari		Telugu		
1993	Kondapalli Raja		Telugu		
1993	Bava Bavamaridi	Raju	Telugu		
1993	Donga Alludu		Telugu		
1993	Thodudongalu		Telugu		
1993	Chinna Alludu		Telugu		
1994	Alludu Poru Ammayi Joru	Kalyan	Telugu		
1994	Bhale Mamayya		Telugu		
1994	Palleturi Mogudu		Telugu		
1994	Hello Alludu		Telugu		
1994	Athiradi Padai		Tamil		
1994	Bangaru Mogudu		Telugu		
1995	Maaya Bazaar		Telugu		
1995	Khaidi Inspector		Telugu		
1995	Alumagalu		Telugu		
1995	Muddayi Muddugumma	Vijay Kumar aka Vicky	Telugu		
1995	Balarajugari Bangarupellam		Telugu		
1996	Abbai Gari Pelli		Telugu		
1996	Nayudugari Kutumbam		Telugu		
1997	Surya Puthrulu		Telugu		
1997	Osi Naa Maradalaa		Telugu		
1997	Jackie Chan		Kannada		
1997	Zindabad		Kannada		
1997	Annamayya	Lord Venkateshwara	Telugu		
1997	Priyamina Srivaru	Raja	Telugu		
1997	Emandi Pelli Chesukundi	Rajasekhar	Telugu		
1997	Allari Pelli Koduku		Telugu		
1998	Swarnamukhi		Telugu		
1998	Mr. Putsami		Kannada		
1998	One Man Army		Kannada		
1998	Sreevarante Mavare		Telugu		
1999	Ramasakkanodu		Telugu		
1999	Peddamanushulu		Telugu		
2000	Sammakka Sarakka		Telugu		
2000	Adavi Chukka		Telugu		
2000	Ee Tharam Nehru	S.P. Chakravarthy	Telugu		
2000	Devullu	Lord Venkateswara	Telugu		
2001	Neelambari	Veera	Kannada		
2001	Inspector Vikram		Telugu		
2002	Chandravamsham		Telugu		
2002	Lahiri Lahiri Lahirilo	Chandrama Naidu	Telugu		
2003	Neeku Nenu Naaku Nuvvu	Prasad	Telugu		
2003	Ammulu		Telugu		
2003	Back Pocket	Durga Prasad	Telugu		
2003	Kalyana Ramudu	Shiva	Telugu		
2003	Gangotri	Narasimha	Telugu		
2003	Toli Choopulone	Srikar Prasad	Telugu		
2004	February 14 Nekles Road		Telugu		
2004	Athade Oka Sainyam	General Manager Raghava Rao	Telugu		
2004	Aaptudu		Telugu	Guest appearance	
2004	Leela Mahal Center	Sudheer	Telugu		
2004	Santhi Sandesam	John the Baptist	Telugu		
2005	Jai Balaji		Telugu		
2005	Balu ABCDEFG	Ranga Rao	Telugu		
2005	Mahanandi	Police Inspector	Telugu		
2005	Naa Alludu	Bhanumathi's Husband	Telugu		
2006	Ganga		Telugu		
2006	Sri Ramadasu	Rama	Telugu		
2006	Sri Satyanarayana Swamy		Telugu		
2007	Vanjagan		Tamil		
2007	Sardar Papanna		Telugu		
2007	Vijayadasami	Chennamaneni Rajeswara Rao	Telugu		
2007	Okkadunnadu	Gowri Shankar	Telugu		
2007	Gautama Buddha	Bimbisara	Telugu / Hindi		
2007	Toss		Telugu		
2007	Death and Taxis	Taxi passenger	English		
2007	Challenge	Vishwa	Telugu		
2007	Sivaji: The Boss	Adiseshan	Tamil		
2008	Vaana	Col. Choudary	Telugu		
2008	Mr. Medhavi		Telugu		
2008	Pourudu	Pandu	Telugu		
2008	Bindaas		Kannada		
2008	Arjun	Surya	Kannada		
2008	Minchina Ota		Kannada		
2008	Kuruvi	Kocha	Tamil		
2008	Veedu Mamoolodu Kadu	Swathi's father	Telugu		
2008	Aegan	John Chinnappa	Tamil		
2009	Padikathavan	Samarasimma Reddy	Tamil		
2009	Sagar alias Jacky Reloaded	Nanthakrishna Naina	Malayalam		
2009	Pazhassi Raja	Pazhayamveedan Chandhu	Malayalam		
2009	Karthikai		Tamil		
2009	Sivappu Mazhai	Minister	Tamil		
2010	Seeta Ramula Kalyanam	Peddi Reddy	Telugu		
2010	Leader	CM Sanjeevayya	Telugu		
2010	Jhummandi Naadam	Sravya's father	Telugu		
2010	Engeyum Kadhal	Rajasekhar	Tamil		
2010	Thambi Arjuna	Vedagiri	Tamil		
2011	Ilaignan	Rajanayagam	Tamil		
2011	Koffi Bar	CBI officer	Telugu		
2011	Keratam / Yuvan	Ravishankar	Telugu / Tamil		
2011	Swayam Krushi	GK	Kannada		
2011	Dookudu	Commissioner of Police	Telugu		
2011	Aayiram Vilakku		Tamil		
2011	Teja Bhai & Family	Kartha	Malayalam		
2011	Veedu Theda	Das	Telugu		
2012	Murattu Kaalai	Varadharajan	Tamil		
2012	Dammu	Sri Raja Vasi Reddy	Telugu		
2012	Endukante... Premanta!	Sravanthi's father	Telugu		
2012	Marupadiyum Oru Kadhal	Mahi's father	Tamil		
2012	Denikaina Ready	Basha	Telugu		
2012	Sri Vasavi Vaibhavam		Telugu		
2012	Genius		Telugu		
2013	Nimidangal	CBI officer	Tamil		
2013	Alex Pandian	Dr. GKM	Tamil		
2013	Shadow	Chakravarthy	Telugu		
2013	Saradaga Ammayitho		Telugu		
2013	Sahasam	Satyanarayana Varma	Telugu		
2013	Samrajyam II: Son of Alexander	JJ	Malayalam		
2013	Careebeyans		Malayalam		
2013	Jagadguru Adi Shankara	Kapala Marthanda Raju	Telugu		
2013	Bunny n Cherry	Saxena	Telugu		
2014	Anjada Gandu	Bette Gowda	Kannada		
2014	Oka Laila Kosam	Chandra Kanth	Telugu		
2014	Sri Vasavi Kanyaka Parameshwari Charitra	Vishnuvardhan Maharaju	Telugu		
2014	Legend	Jaidev's father	Telugu		
2014	Thalaivan		Tamil		
2015	Yennai Arindhaal	Muruganandham	Tamil		
2015	Gabbar is Back	Digvijay Patil	Hindi		
2015	Red Alert		Kannada		
2015	High Alert		Malayalam		
2015	Subramanyam for Sale	Redappa	Telugu		
2015	Apoorva Mahaan	Annachi	Tamil		
2015	Red Alert		Telugu		
2015	Sankarabharanam	Raghu	Telugu		
2015	Vajrakaya	Veera Prathapa Simha	Kannada		
2016	Dictator	Raja Shekar Dharma	Telugu		
2016	Sowkarpettai	Gothra	Tamil		
2016	Tyson		Kannada		
2016	Sarrainodu	DGP Ranjit	Telugu		
2016	Hyper	Rama Chandra	Telugu		
2017	Aakatayi	Shekhar	Telugu		
2017	Sita Ramanka Bahaghara Kali Jugare	Ramprasad	Odia		
2017	Si3	Ram Prasad	Tamil		
2017	Muthuramalingam	Sethuraman	Tamil		
2017	Vaigai Express	Karikalan	Tamil		
2017	Samanthakamani	Jaganath	Telugu		
2017	Jaya Janaki Nayaka	Central Minister	Telugu		
2017	Nibunan / Vismaya	Emmanuel	Tamil / Kannada	The character was based on Dr. Rajesh Talwar	
2017	Jani		Kannada		
2018	Irumbu Thirai	ACP	Tamil		
2018	Jamba Lakidi Pamba	God	Telugu		
2018	Premaku Raincheck	Mitra	Telugu		
2019	Vantha Rajavathaan Varuven	Aadhithya's father	Tamil		
2019	Watchman	Rasheed Khan	Tamil		
2019	Crazy Crazy Feeling	Abhi's father	Telugu		
2019	Okate Life	ACP Mahindar	Telugu		
2019	Unarvu	Muthuswamy	Tamil		
2019	Marshal	Abhi's father	Telugu		
2019	Bharaate	Jagan's father	Kannada		
2020	Ram	Dhananjay	Malayalam		
2020	Prema Pipasi		Telugu		
2021	Seetha Ramula Kalyanam Chuthamu Raarandi		Telugu		
2021	Telangana Devudu		Telugu		
2021	Ram Asur	Balaramaraju	Telugu		
2022	Home Minister	Balaramaraju	Kannada		
2022	The Legend	VJ	Tamil		
2022	Nachindi Girl Friendu	Mukesh	Telugu		
2023	Varisu	Gautham	Tamil		
2023	IQ	Prakash Goud	Telugu		
2023	Extra Ordinary Man	DGP S. Arjun Baldev	Telugu		
2024	Pambattam	Police officer	Tamil		
2025	Pourusham		Telugu		
2025	Shiva Shambho		Telugu		
2025	Netterekere	Surendra 'Talwar Suri'	Tulu		
2025	Meghalu Cheppina Prema Katha	Mahendra	Telugu		
2025	Ari: My Name is Nobody		Telugu		
2025	School Life		Telugu		
2025	Jayaho Ramanuja	Delhi Sultan			
TBA	Rhythm †	Sangeetha's father	Kannada		
