= Kanal Kannan =

Indian actor, action choreographer and screenwriter

- Born: V. Kannan; Vallivaram, Nagercoil, Tamil Nadu, India
- Occupations: actor, screenwriter, action choreographer, stunt co-ordinator
- Years active: 1989-present

Kanal Kannan (born V. Kannan) is an Indian actor, action choreographer and screenwriter who works in Tamil, Telugu, Malayalam, Kannada and Hindi films. He has worked with actors Ajith Kumar, Vijay, Silambarasan, Suriya, Vishal, Arjun, R. Sarath Kumar, Mammootty and Prithviraj Sukumaran in many films.

Stunt coordinators including Stun Shiva, Peter Hein, Anal Arasu, K. Ganesh Kumar, Silva, Rajasekhar, Hari Dinesh, Supreme Sundar, T. Ramesh and Thunder Jeeva have worked as fighters and assistants to him.

== Filmography ==
=== As an action choreographer ===
- All films are in Tamil, unless otherwise noted.

Year	Title	Note
1991	Cheran Pandiyan	
1991	Anbu Sangili	
1991	Putham Pudhu Payanam	
1992	Oor Mariyadhai	
1992	Mudhal Seethanam	
1992	Kizhakku Veluthachu	
1992	En Aasai Rasathi	
1992	Abhirami	
1993	Suriyan Chandiran	
1993	Aranmanai Kili	
1993	Gokulam	
1994	Captain	Tamil/Telugu
1994	Sakthivel	
1994	Priyanka	
1994	Manasu Rendum Pudhusu	
1994	Maindhan	
1994	Chinna Madam	
1994	Sevvanthi	
1994	Pudhusa Pootha Rosa	
1994	Nattamai	
1994	Kaviyam	
1994	Nila	
1994	Pudhiya Mannargal	
1995	Deva	
1995	Chinna Mani	
1995	Muthukulikka Vaariyala	
1995	Ellame En Rasathan	
1995	Pasumpon	
1995	Ilaya Ragam	
1995	Nandhavana Theru	
1995	Chellakannu	
1995	Vishnu	
1995	Periya Kudumbam	
1995	Chandralekha	
1995	Muthu	
1995	Seethanam	
1995	Thotta Chinungi	
1995	Raja Simham	Telugu
1995	Ayudha Poojai	
1995	Mannai Thottu Kumbidanum	
1996	Aruva Velu	
1996	Parambarai	
1996	Poove Unakkaga	
1996	Sengottai	
1996	Manikkam	
1996	Parivattam	
1996	Namma Ooru Rasa	
1996	Avvai Shanmughi	
1996	Mr. Romeo	
1996	Panchalankurichi	
1996	Selva	
1997	Sakthi	
1997	Hitler	Telugu
1997	Preminchuku	Telugu
1997	Bharathi Kannamma	
1997	Superman	Malayalam
1997	Collector Garu	Telugu
1997	Suryavamsam	
1997	Adimai Sangili	
1997	Samrat	
1997	Adavilo Anna	Telugu
1997	Porkkaalam	
1998	Rathna	
1998	Bavagaru Bagunnara	Telugu
1998	Pavitra Prema	Telugu
1998	Desiya Geetham	
1998	Sri Ramulayya	Telugu
1998	Suryavamsam	Telugu
1999	Thullatha Manamum Thullum	
1999	Adutha Kattam	
1999	Padayappa	
1999	Minsara Kanna	
1999	Nenjinile	
1999	Oruvan	
1999	Nee Varuvai Ena	
1999	Jodi	
1999	Hello	
1999	Mudhalvan	
1999	Pattali	
2000	Annayya	Telugu
2000	Thirunelveli	
2000	Narasimham	Malayalam
2000	Good Luck	
2000	Sudhandhiram	
2000	Mugavaree	
2000	Rayalaseema Ramanna Chowdary	Telugu
2000	Unnai Kodu Ennai Tharuven	
2000	Pennin Manathai Thottu	
2000	Yuvakudu	Telugu
2000	Maayi	
2000	Uyirile Kalanthathu	
2000	Azaad	Telugu
2000	Priyamanavale	
2000	Ennavalle	
2000	Dada Sahib	Malayalam
2001	Friends	
2001	Eduruleni Manishi	Telugu
2001	Karumadikkuttan	Malayalam
2001	Badri	
2001	Citizen	
2001	Poovellam Un Vasam	
2001	Rakshasa Rajavu	Malayalam
2001	Alli Thandha Vaanam	
2001	Nayak: The Real Hero	Hindi
2001	Manadhai Thirudivittai	
2001	Hanuman Junction	Telugu
2001	Raavanaprabhu	Malayalam
2002	Seema Simham	Telugu
2002	Red	
2002	Charlie Chaplin	
2002	Roja Kootam	
2002	Phantom	Malayalam
2002	Sri Bannari Amman	
2002	Junior Senior	
2002	Ezhumalai	
2002	Raja	
2002	Samurai	
2002	Youth	
2002	Karmegham	
2002	Ivan	
2002	King	
2002	Five Star	
2002	En Mana Vaanil	
2002	Villain	
2002	Virumbugiren	
2003	Kadhaludan	
2003	Manasellam	
2003	Ennai Thalatta Varuvala	
2003	Parasuram	
2003	Whistle	
2003	Eera Nilam	
2003	Diwan	
2003	Three Roses	
2003	Anjaneya	
2003	Vishnu	Telugu
2004	Kadamba	Kannada
2004	Anji	Telugu
2004	Gambeeram	
2004	Aethiree	
2004	Jana	
2004	Sullan	
2004	Singara Chennai	
2004	Madurey	
2004	Sathyam	Malayalam
2004	M. Kumaran S/O Mahalakshmi	
2004	Manmadhan	
2005	Aayudham	
2005	Bunny	Telugu
2005	6'2	
2005	Bhadra	Telugu
2005	Kana Kandaen	
2005	Andarivaadu	Telugu
2005	Anbe Aaruyire	
2005	Ghajini	
2005	Bageeratha	Telugu
2005	Bambara Kannaley	
2005	Mahanandi	Telugu
2005	Sandakozhi	
2006	Saravana	
2006	Lakshmi	Telugu
2006	Yuga	
2006	Asthram	Telugu
2006	Thimiru	
2006	Stalin	Telugu
2006	Chinnodu	Telugu
2006	Seethakoka Chiluka	Telugu
2006	Varalaru	
2006	Thalaimagan	
2006	Vallavan	
2006	Chennai Kadhal	
2007	Deepavali	
2007	Pori	
2007	Thullal	
2007	Evadaithe Nakenti	Telugu
2007	En Uyirinum Melana	
2007	Dhee	Telugu
2007	Lakshyam	Telugu
2007	Malaikottai	
2007	Thulasi	Telugu
2007	Black Cat	Malayalam
2008
2008	Bheema	
2008	Kaalai	
2008	Sadhu Miranda	
2008	Singakutty	
2008	Dasavatharam	
2008	Dhaam Dhoom	
2008	Ellam Avan Seyal	
2008	Hero	Telugu
2008	Saamida	
2008	Silambattam	
2009	Satrumun Kidaitha Thagaval	
2009	Ayan	
2009	Rajadhi Raja	
2009	Raju Maharaju	
2009	Current	Telugu
2009	Malai Malai	
2009	Kanthaswamy	
2009	Aadhavan	
2009	Amaravathi	Telugu
2009	Vettaikaaran	
2010	Aasal	
2010	Paiyaa	
2010	Sura	
2010	Pokkiri Raja	Malayalam
2010	Maanja Velu	
2010	Kaadhal Solla Vandhen	
2010	Moscowin Kavery	
2011	Ponnar-Shankar	
2011	Engeyum Kadhal	
2011	Ra.One	Hindi
2011	Thambi Vettothi Sundaram	
2011	Osthe	
2012	Nippu	Telugu
2012	Mallu Singh	Malayalam
2012	Hero	Malayalam
2013	Naayak	Telugu
2013	Samar	
2013	Kammath & Kammath	
2013	Mirchi	Telugu
2013	Zila Ghaziabad	Hindi
2013	Thirumathi Thamizh	
2013	Mr. Pellikoduku	Telugu
2013	Tadakha	Telugu
2013	Policegiri	Hindi
2013	Shortcut Romeo	Hindi
2013	Adda	Telugu
2013	D Company	Telugu
2013	Phata Poster Nikhla Hero	Hindi
2013	Ramayya Vasthavayya	Telugu
2013	Doosukeltha	Telugu
2013	Singh Saab The Great	Hindi
2014	Legend	Telugu
2014	Thirumanam Ennum Nikkah	
2014	Irumbu Kuthirai	
2014	Poojai	
2015	Aambala	
2015	Isai	
2015	Killadi	
2015	Anegan	
2015	Rombha Nallavan Da Nee	
2015	Vaalu	
2015	Adhibar	
2016	Saagasam	
2016	Sowkarpettai	
2016	Vaaliba Raja	
2016	Kotigobba 2 / Mudinja Ivana Pudi	Kannada / Tamil
2016	Vaaimai	
2016	Wagah	
2016	Uchathula Shiva	
2016	Kaththi Sandai	
2017	Si3	
2017	Sathya	Malayalam
2017	Masterpiece	Malayalam
2017	Vaigai Express	
2017	Khaidi No. 150	Telugu
2019	Charlie Chaplin 2	
2019	Kanniyum Kaalaiyum Sema Kadhal	
2019	Vinaya Vidheya Rama	Telugu
2019	Yajamana	Kannada
2019	Jack & Daniel	Malayalam
2019	My Santa	Malayalam
2021	Jai Bhim	
2021	Naanum Single Thaan	
2022	Etharkkum Thunindhavan	
2022	Carbon	
2022	Yutha Satham	
2022	Khudiram Bose (film)	Telugu
2022	Kaduva	Malayalam
2023	Bommai	
2023	Mark Antony	
2023	Therkathi Veeran	
2023	Pattathu Arasan	
2023	Kulasami	
2023	Kannur Squad	Malayalam; co-choreographer
2023	Chandramukhi 2	
2024	Rathnam	
2026	Colony	
2026	Sandakari	
2026	Purushan	

=== As an actor ===
Year	Title	Role	Note
1989	Anbu Kattalai	Henchman	special appearance
1990	Paattali Magan	Henchman	special appearance
1993	Aranmanai Kili	Henchman	special appearance
1994	Captain	Auto Driver	special appearance
1994	Naatamai	Silambam player	special appearance
1995	Muthu Kulikka Vaarieyala		special appearance
1995	Ellame En Rasathan	Rogue	special appearance
1995	Thai Thangai Paasam		special appearance
1996	Avvai Shanmughi	Henchman	special appearance
1996	Namma Ooru Rasa	Henchman	special appearance
1997	Porkkaalam	Postman	special appearance
1998	Kadhal Mannan	Taxi Driver	special appearance
1998	Sollamale	Coconut Seller	special appearance
1999	Padayappa	Village man	special appearance
1999	Nee Varuvai Ena	Bus Passenger	special appearance
1999	Mudhalvan	Auto Driver	special appearance
2000	Mugavaree		special appearance
2000	Pennin Manathai Thottu	Pickpocket	special appearance
2000	Uyirile Kalanthathu	Kanal	
2001	Manadhai Thirudivittai	Rogue	special appearance
2001	Citizen	Stunt Dupe	special appearance
2002	Red		special appearance
2002	Vivaramana Aalu	Karuppu	special appearance
2002	Charlie Chaplin	Rouge	special appearance
2002	Raja	Henchman	special appearance
2002	Ivan	Henchman	special appearance
2002	Villain	Henchman	special appearance
2003	Diwan	Referee	special appearance
2003	Villain	Henchman	special appearance
2004	Aethiree	Police Driver	special appearance
2004	Sullan	Rouge	special appearance
2004	Singara Chennai	Auto Driver	
2006	Thimiru	Dancer	special appearance in the song "Oppurane Oppurane"
2006	Vallavan		special appearance
2007	Pori	Jackpot Ayyanardurai	special appearance
2007	Madurai Veeran	Kanal	special appearance
2007	Sivaji	Kanal Kannan	special appearance as a Henchman
2007	En Uyirinum Melana		special appearance in the song "Kaakka Kaakka"
2007	Malaikottai	Mattu Ravi	special appearance
2008	Silambattam	Pulippal Boopathy	special appearance as a Henchman
2008	Bheema	Rogue	special appearance
2009	Satrumun Kidaitha Thagaval	Shiva	
2010	Moscowin Kavery	Azhagan's right hand	
2011	Sankarankovil	Kathir	
2013	Onbadhule Guru		special appearance in the song "Alaiyadhe Summa Summa"
2015	Aambala	Henchman	
2015	Killadi	Kangu Kannan	special appearance as a Thief
2015	Rombha Nallavan Da Nee	Henchman	
2016	Vaaliba Raja	Romantic Kannan	guest appearance
2016	Uchathula Shiva		
2017	Sakka Podu Podu Raja	Himself	special appearance
2022	Etharkkum Thunindhavan	Passerby	

== Writer ==
- 2011 Sankarankovil (also producer - uncredited)

== Extra Fighter ==
- 1985 Pattuchelai
- 1989 Enne Petha Raasa
- 1990 Pachai Kodi
- 1990 Maruthu Pandi

== Awards ==
Won

- 1995 Tamil Nadu State Film Award for Best Stunt Coordinator - Muthu
- 1996 Tamil Nadu State Film Award for Best Stunt Coordinator - Selva
- 1996 Dinakaran Award for Best Stunt Master - Selva
- 1999 Dinakaran Award for Best Stunt for Stunt Choreographer - Padayappa, Mudhalvan
- 1999 Nandi Award for Best Fight Master - Annayya
- 2000 Dinakaran Award for Best Stunt Master - Maayi
- 2000 Nandi Award for Best Fight Master - Azad
- 2004 Medimix-Dinakaran Award for Best Stunt Master - M. Kumaran S/O Mahalakshmi
- 2004 Filmfare Award for Best Action Director - South - Madurey
- 2005 Tamil Nadu State Film Award for Best Stunt Coordinator - Sandakozhi
- 2006 Vijay Award for Best Stunt Director - Varalaru: The History of Godfather
- 2008 Tamil Nadu State Film Award for Best Stunt Coordinator - Silambattam
- 2008 Anada Vikatan Award for Best Stunt Director - Bheemaa
- 2009 Edison Awards For Best Action - Ayan
- 2009 Maha Fine Arts for Best Stunt - Aadhavan
- 2009 V4 Popular Film Awards Best Stunt - Aadhavan

Nominated

- 2007 Vijay Award for Best Stunt Director - Deepavali
- 2008 Vijay Award for Best Stunt Director - Dasavathaaram
- 2008 Vijay Award for Best Stunt Director - Bheema
- 2009 Vijay Award for Best Stunt Director - Ayan
- 2009 Vijay Award for Best Stunt Director - Vettaikaaran
- 2010 Vijay Award for Best Stunt Director - Paiyaa
- 2014 Vijay Award for Best Stunt Director - Poojai
- 2015 Edison Awards For Best Action - Aambala

== Controversies ==
=== Cases ===
Kannan has filed a case against his wife in April 2012 in a city family court to bring his wife Hemavathi who was living in separation from him due to some differences, back to his family.

Kannan's neighbour filed a complaint against Kannan in the Chennai police department in October 2007 accusing him of shooting dead one of the stray dogs she feeds with a gun. The complainant also filed a complaint against Kannan at the Chennai Police Commissioner Office. She later told the Journalists that Kannan who was enraged of her complaint, entered her house and beat up her brother and also said that her life is in danger and the police are trying to cover up the incident. Kannan denied the allegations and claimed that he was not in Chennai when the incident took place.

=== Arrest ===
On 18 June 2023, Kanal Kannan shared a misleading video in social media of Brazilian actor playing the role of a Christian priest and dancing with a woman, and included a caption urging converted Hindus to repent for the state of "foreign religious culture". Kannan was detained for disrespecting religious sentiments and was sent to judicial custody and an FIR for insulting religious sentiments has been filed under various sections of the Indian Penal Code.
