= Shalom Studios =

Indian Film Production Company

- Industry: Entertainment; Motion Picture
- Founded: 2008; 18 years ago
- Headquarters: Chennai, Tamil Nadu, India
- Key people: John Max
- Services: Film Production; Film Distribution
- Website: www.shalomstudios.in

Shalom Studios is an Indian film production company based in Chennai, Tamil Nadu. It was established by John Max. Its first Production Mynaa (2010), directed by Prabhu Solomon was critically acclaimed and commercially successful. Prabhu Solomon and John Max joined hands for their next film Saattai (2012) under the banner. The movie received good reviews and had decent initial collections.

In 2013, Prabhu Solomon stepped out of the production house and handed the entire production work to John Max . He Produced several films under the banner which include Mosakutty, Sowkarpettai and Pottu.

Their Recent Film Kaa - The Forest was released in February 2026 Opened to Mixed Reviews.

== Filmography ==
Year	Title	Director	Cast	Notes
2010	Mynaa	Prabhu Solomon	Amala Paul, Vidharth	
2012	Saattai	M. Anbazhagan	Yuvan, Mahima Nambiar	
2014	Mosakutty	M. Jeevan	Mahima Nambiar, Veera	
2016	Sowkarpettai	V. C. Vadivudaiyan	Raai Laxmi, Srikanth	
2019	Pottu	V. C. Vadivudaiyan	Bharath, Ineya, Srushti Dange	
2026	Kaa – The Forest	Nanjil	Andrea Jeremiah, Salim Ghouse	
TBA	Sambavam †	Ranjith	Srikanth, Natty Subramaniam	

== Awards ==
Year	Movie	Ceremony	Category
2010	Mynaa	58th Filmfare Awards South	Filmfare Award for Best Film - Tamil
2010	Mynaa	Vijay Awards	Vijay Award for Best Crew
2010	Mynaa	Tamil Nadu State Film Awards	Best Film
2010	Mynaa	Ananda Vikatan Cinema Awards	Best Film
2010	Mynaa	Norway Tamil Film Festival Awards	Best Film
2012	Saattai	Edison Awards	Best Educational Movie
2012	Saattai	Tamil Nadu State Film Awards	Best Film (Second Price)
