= Pottu =

2019 Indian film by Vadivudaiyan

- Poster
- Directed by: Vadivudaiyan
- Written by: Vadivudaiyan
- Produced by: John Max; Jones
- Starring: Bharath; Namitha; Ineya; Srushti Dange
- Cinematography: Sarvesh Murari
- Edited by: Elisa
- Music by: Amresh Ganesh
- Production company: Shalom Studios
- Distributed by: Chaya Puthura Productions
- Release date: 8 March 2019
- Running time: 116 minutes
- Country: India
- Language: Tamil

Pottu (transl. Vermillion / Bindi) is a 2019 Indian Tamil-language horror comedy film written and directed by Vadivudaiyan. The film stars Bharath, Namitha, Ineya and Srushti Dange. With music composed by Amresh Ganesh, the film is produced by John Max for Shalom Studios. Pottu is a movie, following along the lines of this producer-director combo's earlier movie Sowkarpettai (2016). The film was launched in January 2016 and released on 8 March 2019.

== Synopsis ==
The film revolves around two medical students, Arjun (Bharath) and Nithya (Srushti Dange). Arjun achieves the top rank in his class through dishonest means, while Nithya, who is a talented student, comes in second. Despite this, both of them enroll in the same college. One night, Arjun goes to the college with the intention of altering a paper, but he gets caught and is punished by being forced to stay overnight. The next day, he is interrogated by the heads of various departments. While drinking, Arjun gets into an argument with his friend and throws a bottle, which shatters and cuts his hand. However, the situation takes a strange turn when his blood spills on the tomb of Pottu (Ineya), and a mysterious power enters his body, causing him to behave like a girl. As the plot unfolds, the mystery of who Pottu is and what she desires is revealed.

== Cast ==
- Bharath as Arjun
- Namitha as Bhrameshwari
- Ineya as Pottu
- Srushti Dange as Nithya
- Urvashi as Mohana, Arjun's mother
- Thambi Ramaiah as Arjun's father
- Shakeela as Biochemistry Professor
- Nirosha as Pathology Professor
- Rajendran as Poonandi
- Mansoor Ali Khan as Swami
- Bharani as Arjun's classmate
- Sayaji Shinde as Dr. RK
- Swaminathan as Thief
- Nikesh Ram as Pottu's father
- Aryan as Veeraiah
- Kalidoss as Human Anatomy Professor
- Raviraj as Physiology Professor
- Bava Lakshmanan as Parrot Astrologer
- Bayilvan Ranganathan as Police Inspector
- V. M. Subburaj as Swami's assistant
- Bobby as Salim Bhai
- Scissor Manohar
- Vengal Rao

== Production ==
Producers Jones and John Max announced the project during November 2015 and revealed that they would work on a horror film with director Vadivudaiyan, even before the release of their other collaboration, Sowkarpettai (2016). Bharath was signed on to portray the leading role, and the director noted that he would have a female makeover for certain portions of the film. The film began shooting during January 2016 in Chennai, with three actresses - Ineya, Namitha, and Manisha Yadav- signed to portray pivotal roles. Manisha Yadav was later replaced by Srushti Dange after an initial photoshoot was held, and was revealed to play the role of a medical student. Ineya was revealed to play the titular character, and Namitha stated she would play the antagonist. In July 2016, the team shot scenes in the tribal area of Kolli Malai, where huge sets were erected at an altitude of 2,000 feet. Production was completed in mid-2017, with the film's release delayed several times as a result of an unavailability of screens.

== Soundtrack ==
Pottu

Soundtrack album by Amresh Ganesh
- Released: 2019
- Genre: Soundtrack
- Length: 18:53
- Label: Triple V Records
- Producer: Amresh Ganesh

Amresh Ganesh chronology
| Charlie Chaplin 2 (2019) | Pottu (2019) | Sathru (2019) |

The music was composed by Amresh Ganesh.

Track list
| No. | Title | Lyrics | Singer(s) | Length |
|---|---|---|---|---|
| 1. | "Adi Podi Sandali" | Eknath | V. V. Prasanna, Vandana | 5:16 |
| 2. | "Malamela Samiya" | Sorko | Malathi, Orathanadu Gopu | 4:45 |
| 3. | "Kulikki Thakathe" | Karunakaran | Gana Bala | 4:16 |
| 4. | "Amma Jagatharani" | Viveka | Amrish | 4:35 |
| Total length: | | | | 18:53 |

== Release and reception ==
The movie was released on 8 March 2019. P. Sangeetha of The Times of India rated the film 1.5/5 stating, "Though Pottu is billed as a horror comedy, not one scene is scary or really funny. The characters are mostly loud and dramatic. The constant background noise is exasperating".
