= John Peter (composer) =

- Born: Chennai, Tamil Nadu, India
- Occupations: Music director, lyricist
- Years active: 2013–present

John Peter is an Indian film composer and producer who has predominantly scored music for Tamil films.

== Career ==
Peter worked as a bureaucrat before first working as a musician on Prathi Gnayiru 9 Manimudhal 10.30 Varai (2006), which had a delayed release. He subsequently went on to work closely with Harikumar who gave him the chance to compose the songs for Madurai Sambavam (2009) and Bodinayakanur Ganesan (2011). Similarly, Vadivudaiyan gave him the chance to work on two films, Kanniyum Kaalaiyum Sema Kadhal and Sowkarpettai (2015), which became Peter's most high-profile projects. In 2015, he also worked on the Vijay Vasanth-starrer Vanna Jigina, produced by N. Linguswamy.

== Discography ==
- Films released in order of album release, regardless of the date of the film's release.

| Year | Film | Notes |
|---|---|---|
| 2005 | Neeye Nijam | |
| 2005 | Ragasiya Snehithane (Azhagiya Aabathu) | |
| 2005 | Prathi Gnayiru 9 Manimudhal 10.30 Varai | |
| 2006 | Vanjagan | |
| 2009 | Madurai Sambavam | |
| 2011 | Mr. Rascal | Telugu film |
| 2011 | Othigai | |
| 2011 | Bodinayakkanur Ganesan | |
| 2013 | Sogusu Perundhu | |
| 2014 | Andava Kapathu | |
| 2014 | Pagadai Pagadai | |
| 2014 | Kanniyum Kaalaiyum Sema Kadhal | |
| 2015 | Vanna Jigina | |
| 2015 | Sowkarpettai | |
| 2016 | Saaya | |
| 2024 | Badava | also producer |
| 2026 | Siva Sambo | Songs only |

== Filmography ==
As producer

- Badava (2024)
- Thanal (2025)
