= En Uyirinum Melana =

- Theatrical release poster
- Directed by: K. R. Jaya
- Written by: K. R. Jaya; Balakumaran (dialogues)
- Produced by: N. Thirumurugan; Vasu S. Ashokumar
- Starring: Ajith Chander; Radhika Menon
- Cinematography: R. Selva
- Edited by: P. C. Mohanan
- Music by: Deva
- Production company: NNT Movie Creations
- Release date: 10 August 2007
- Running time: 140 minutes
- Country: India
- Language: Tamil

En Uyirinum Melana (transl. More than my life) is a 2007 Indian Tamil-language romantic drama film directed by K. R. Jaya. The film stars newcomers Ajith Chander and Radhika Menon, with S. P. Balasubrahmanyam, Ranjith, Ravikumar, Karunas, Kaka Radhakrishnan, Charuhasan, Fathima Babu and Kamala Kamesh playing supporting roles. The film's musical score was by Deva and was released on 10 August 2007.

== Plot ==
Jeeva is a carefree youth who lives with his parents in Chennai. His father Vijayarangam is a wealthy businessman who spoils him and loves him more than anything. During a trip in Kodaikanal, Jeeva falls under the spell of Priya and gives her a rose for a television show but she slaps him in front of the camera. Later, Priya moves with her family to a house near Jeeva's house in Chennai. One day, Jeeva finds Priya's brother lying in the street after an accident and he admits him to the hospital thus saving his life. Priya thanks Jeeva for the help, they first become friends and they eventually fall in love with each other.

When Priya's father discovers his daughter's love affair, he decides to find her a groom. Thereafter, Priya and her wealthy maternal uncle Vikram from London get engaged. Vijayarangam strongly supports his son's love and he plans to arrange his son's wedding on the same day and at the same wedding hall. With the help of his friends and Priya's brother, Jeeva kidnaps Priya the day of the wedding with a caravan. Priya's father who is an intelligence officer and Vikram try to catch the lovers but they fail. Vijayarangam then meets Priya's father and he successfully convinces him to support their love. The lovers finally come to the wedding hall and Vikram surprisingly supports their love. The film ends with Jeeva and Priya getting married with the blessing of their family.

== Cast ==
- Ajith Chander as Jeeva
- Radhika Menon as Priya
- S. P. Balasubrahmanyam as Vijayarangam, Jeeva's father
- Ranjith as Vikram (guest appearance)
- Ravikumar as Priya's father
- Karunas as Johnny
- Kaka Radhakrishnan as Jeeva's grandfather
- Charuhasan as Sathyananda Swamy
- Fathima Babu as Kamakshi, Jeeva's mother
- Kamala Kamesh as Priya's grandmother
- Lollu Sabha Balaji as Jeeva's friend
- Master Andrew as Priya's brother
- Pandu as MP Ramalingam
- Sempuli Jagan as MLA Kuzhandai Tamizharasan
- Bayilvan Ranganathan as Inspector Munnusamy
- Chaplin Balu as Servant
- Singamuthu as Singam
- Bonda Mani
- Nellai Siva
- Thadi Balaji as Paramasivam
- V. M. Subburaj as Subburaj
- Siva Narayana Murthy
- Theni Murugan
- Vijay Ganesh
- Maayi Sundar
- Visalini
- Parimala
- Master Surya
- Kanal Kannan (special appearance in the song Kakka Kakka)

== Production ==
K. R. Jaya who made his directorial debut with Uyirile Kalanthathu (2000) returned with En Uyirinum Melana under the banner of NNT Movie Creations. He had intermittently worked on an unreleased project titled June July in between. Newcomer Ajith Chander, an engineer from Chennai, was cast to play the hero while Radhika Menon from Mumbai was selected to play his love interest. Singer S. P. Balasubrahmanyam signed to play the father role. Kanal Kannan who choreographed the stunts for the film, also played a rowdy and got to sing a gaana song. R. Selva handled the cinematography, whereas the editing was by P. C. Mohanan and the art direction by Kiran.

== Soundtrack ==
The soundtrack was composed by Deva, with lyrics written by Vaali, Snehan and Muthu Vijayan.

Track listing
No.	Title	Singer(s)	Length
1.	"Mylapooru Rani"	Ranjith, Grace Karunas	4:11
2.	"Pacchai Pudavai"	Sadhana Sargam	6:31
3.	"Yea Valibha Payaley"	Anuradha Sriram	5:43
4.	"Oru Nimidam Poru"	M. G. Sreekumar, Harini	5:52
5.	"Vali Vali Kaadhal Vali" (duet)	S. P. Balasubrahmanyam, Sujatha Mohan	5:34
6.	"Kakka Kakka"	Deva	4:47
7.	"Vali Vali Kaadhal Vali" (solo)	Sujatha Mohan	0:52
Total length:			33:30

== Reception ==
A reviewer from Koodal gave the film a negative review, criticizing the poor plot and weak screenplay. Indiareel wrote, "Selva's cinematography comes as a saving grace for En Uyirinum Melana. The movie would have been much batter only if the director had concentrated in making the screenplay much interesting and racy".
