= Kaa – The Forest =

2024 Indian film

Kaa: The Forest
- Theatrical release poster
- Directed by: Nanjil
- Written by: Nanjil
- Produced by: John Max
- Starring: Andrea Jeremiah; Salim Ghouse
- Cinematography: Arivazhagan
- Edited by: Elisa
- Music by: Sundar C. Babu
- Production company: Shalom Studios
- Release dates: March 2024 (premiere); 13 February 2026 (Worldwide)
- Country: India
- Language: Tamil

Kaa: The Forest (Note: "Kaa" is short for Kaadu or Kaanagam, meaning jungle or forest.) is a 2024 Indian Tamil-language survival thriller film directed by Nanjil and starring Andrea Jeremiah and Salim Ghouse. Sundar C. Babu composed the music. The film, produced by Shalom Studios, began production in April 2018, but was delayed for six years. It marks Ghouse's final film and posthumous appearance. The film premiered in March 2024 and was set to release theatrically the same month before getting delayed again due to legal and financial issues. It was eventually released on 13 February 2026.

== Plot ==
A wildlife photographer, a forest guard and a henchman's lives are intertwined in this film, in which the characters fight to be alive.

== Cast ==
- Andrea Jeremiah as Venba Subbaiah
- Salim Ghouse as Victor Mahadevan
  - Daffe Naveen as Young Victor Mahadevan
- Arjun Singh as Mathivanan
- Munnar Subramanian as Forest officer Malaiyappan
- P. K. Kamalesh as Mahadevan's henchman
- Rajmohan as Mahadevan's henchman
- Nivas as Mahadevan's henchman
- Akshita as Maithili, Mahadevan's one-sided love interest
- Srisha as Maithili's friend
- Joseph Rukkumani as Fighter
- Karthik Raja as Boy
- Advaith as Boy
- Vijay Senathipathi
- Ramesh
- Surendar
- Rajasekar

== Music ==
The film's music was composed by Sundar C. Babu. In 2018, the director stated that the film would not feature any songs, a decision he took after consulting musician Amresh Ganesh. However, contrary to this statement, the team released a song titled "Kaatu Puli Uru Urumma" on 22 March 2024.

Track listing
No.	Title	Singer(s)	Length
1.	"Kaatu Puli Uru Urumma"	Kidakuzhi Mariammal and Gold Devaraj	3:35

== Release ==
Kaa: The Forest was initially scheduled to release on 29 March 2024, and premiered somewhere in the same month. The same day, Jayakumar, the owner of the production company Eight Entertainment Company who had given a loan of ₹20 lakh (US$21,000) approached the Madras High Court seeking an injunction against the release of the film. After he did not receive his money back, he went to court and obtained an interim ban on the film's release till the dues were settled. The court subsequently put a stay on the film's release until 12 April. In early February 2026, the film was given a new release date, 13 February the same month. The film's Telugu dubbed version titled Kaana: The Forest released theatrically across the Telugu states on 6 March 2026.

== Reception ==
In a review dated 28 March 2024, Roopa Radhakrishnan from The Times of India rated the film 1 1/2 stars out of 5 and wrote, "The spookiness of a film, which revolves around multiple people fighting for their lives, is effectively conveyed. But if we go beyond that, the screenplay is all over the place". In February 2026, independent critic Malini Mannath wrote, "A survival saga, it has a rambling screenplay that makes a futile attempt to link different tracks into a coherent whole. It's a week narrative that meanders through situations that lack conviction and clarity". Maalai Malar rated the film 1 1/2 stars out of 5, praising Andrea's performance and the cinematography but criticising the screenplay and pacing.
