= Ente Ummante Peru =

- Directed by: Jose Sebastian
- Screenplay by: Jose Sebastian; Sarath R. Nath
- Story by: Jose Sebastian
- Produced by: Anto Joseph; C. R. Salim
- Starring: Tovino Thomas; Urvashi
- Cinematography: Jordi Planell Closa
- Edited by: Arju Benn
- Music by: Gopi Sunder
- Production companies: Anto Joseph Film Company; Al Tari Movies
- Release date: 21 December 2018
- Running time: 131 minutes
- Country: India
- Language: Malayalam

Ente Ummante Peru (transl. My mother's name) is a 2018 Indian Malayalam-language road comedy-drama film directed by Jose Sebastian (in his directorial debut) and co-written by Sebastian and Sarath R. Nath. The film stars Tovino Thomas and Urvashi. The story is set in northern Kerala (Malabar region) and moves to Lucknow in the later part.

== Plot ==
Hamid's father Haider is his only relative as he does not know anything about his mother. His father never responds to questions about his mother. Other important people in his life are his father's friend Hamzakoya and his friend Beeran.

One day, Hamid is at a marriage party with Beeran and Beeran is suddenly called by Hamzakoya. He informs Beeran that Hamid's father just died. The death of his father makes Hamid sad since he believes that he now has no family, even though Beeran and Hamzakkoya tells him that they are with him. To pull him out of his loneliness, Hamzakkoya and Beeran advise him to get married.

He meets Sainaba. Even though Hamid and Sainaba likes each other, Sainaba's father does not want them to marry, stating that Hamid is an orphan. This makes Hamid even sadder. He continues his life looking after his antiques shop with Beeran.

One day while clearing junk from his house he finds his father's will, which states that Hamid's father had 2 wives, one in Kozhikode and another in Ponnani. It said that Haider's land must be split into three and two parts must be given to his two wives and one to charity. Hamid sells the land and decides to visit the two widows to give them their inheritance, hoping that one of them would turn out to be his mother.

He travels to Kozhikode to meet Ramlath with Beeran. On reaching Kozhikode he meets Shivan a former employee of his father. He asks him about his mother, but does not get promising answers. On reaching Ramlath's house they are shooed away by her arrogant husband after Hamid tells him that he is Haidar's son. The next day they catch the husband with another woman. They pressurize him and he agrees to let them meet Ramlathumma. Hamid hands over her share of the land but confirms that she is not his mother and thus he confirms that Aishumma in Ponnani should be his mother. He set off to Ponnani to meet her. He meets Aishumma and takes her home.

Though she is kind and caring with Hamid, she was not so with Hamzakoya and Beeran. They are unhappy about Aishumma's arrogant nature and Hamzakoya visits Ponnani to gather information about her. He learns that she is not Hamid's mother. He then while sitting inside his antique shop, a customer comes to buy records for gramophone. He accidentally discovers a postcard inside a record cover. While trying to discuss the price, Hamid gives him the record for free. Since the letter was written in Urdu, he gets it read and explained to him that the letter was sent by Begum Laila, from Firdous Quila, Lucknow. He then plans to visit Lucknow to find out. Aishumma bluffs that she had been to Lucknow 2–3 times with his father. He discovers while reaching Lucknow that she has taken him for a ride about her knowing of the place and it is her first visit. They then reach a lodge and settles down. While asleep, Aishumma steals and hides that post card. She then tries to force Hamid to show her around the city. Hamid tries to reach out to Sivankutty, to find a lead. Hamid gets an address from him about an antique shop. He writes it down in a piece of paper and starts to search the shop, since he does not know to read Urdu and Hindi. The story then leads to the final conclusion that Begum Laila was his mother, and he conformed this after he finds that Begum Laila's son Khalid is the doppelganger of Hamid. But she is now married and has her son getting married next day. He leaves the place tearing off the post card for good and return to his home with accepting Aishumma as his own mother. His friend Beeran calls up and informs that Sainabas father has died and now he can marry her and the film ends.

== Cast ==
- Tovino Thomas in a dual role as:
  - Hamid Hyderali
  - Khalid, Begum Lailaa's son and Hamid's twin
- Urvashi as Ayishah
- Shanthi Krishna as Ramlath
- Shilpa Tulaskar as Begum Lailaa
- Hareesh Perumanna as Beeran
- Mammukoya as Hamzah Koya
- Saipriya Deva as Sainaba
- Siddique as Zakker
- Dileesh Pothan as Shivankutty
- Ramu as Moideen
- Vijayan Karanthoor as Hassan
- Raghavan as Raghavan
- Renji Panicker as Mohammed Hyderali Mehfil
- Unniraj Cheruvathur as Dance master
- Gokulan as Villager

== Music ==
All lyrics are written by B. K. Harinarayanan & Fouzia Abubacker (Urdu Lyrics); all music is composed by Gopi Sundar.

No.	Title	Singer(s)	Length
1.	"Neerkanikayil"	Gopi Sundar
2.	"Madhu Chandhika"	Sithara Krishnakumar
3.	"Sanjaaramayi"	Najim Harshad

== Production ==
Principal photography commenced in April 2018 and the first schedule was wrapped by end of April. The second schedule commenced in September and the filming was complete by October 2018. Gopi Sunder composed the music and background score.

== Reception ==
=== Critical reception ===
The film received positive reviews from critics. Deepa Antony of The Times of India has rated the film 3.5 of 5 stars and wrote:"Ente Ummante Peru, as the title suggests, is the kind of movie that makes you want to call your mother the moment you get out of the theatre. Better still, take your mother with you to watch the movie. If you don't amp up your expectations, Ente Ummante Peru is a feel-good movie which keeps you engaged till it lasts."

Navamy Sudhish of The Hindu said that Ente Ummante Peru is humorous and heart-warming film and "draws its energy from the effortless camaraderie of Tovino Thomas and Urvashi ... And despite its sentimental plot, it never goes gooey and maintains the feel-good vibes till the last frame. The emotional high points of the film are captured with a lot of restraint, and it happens swiftly and spontaneously."

Sajin Shrijith of The New Indian Express rated the film 4 of 5 stars and wrote: "Though the film is high on emotion, the characters’ display of it is admirably restrained. ... Ente Ummante Peru works mostly due to its impactful, heartwarming performances and its effective sense of humour. It's basically the cinematic representation of that quote you sometimes see on social media: Family isn't always blood. It's the people in your life who want you in theirs."

Amrutha Menon P. of Onmanorama wrote: "Tovino Thomas' latest flick 'Ente Ummante Peru' simply put is a tale of love between a son and a mother, and the redefining of their relationship. ... Even though the archetype hero in quest of his mother/father may sound clichéd, and you may be reminded of movies like 'Oru Indian Pranayakatha', 'Aravindante Athidhikal', etc., the film won't disappoint you. Tovino-Urvasi's magic on screen, coupled with Hareesh Kanaran's perfect comic interludes, makes 'Ente Ummante Peru' a reliable family movie."

Few critics were critical of the script. Anna M. M. Vetticad of Firstpost gave the film a 1.5 out of 5 rating, noting that "the script lacks substance" and "there is, after all, only so much that even the great Urvashi and sweet Tovino Thomas can achieve with a clueless script." Cris of The News Minute wrote: "Hameed could have been given more depth (and maturity), the dad could have been more described – why did he keep everything a secret. Why is Hameed in such a hurry to get married? The story lacks depth and the characters are uninteresting. The one who scores here is Urvashi – she does marvelously as the unlikeable Aishu, and speaks the northern slang beautifully. If only the script could be tuned around a little."

== Awards ==
- Urvashi - Vanitha Film Awards - Best Actress for Special Performance
- Urvashi- Asianet Film Awards - Best Actress for Special Performance
- Urvashi- Creative Film Awards - Best Supporting Actress Award
