= Valmiki (2005 film) =

- DVD cover
- Directed by: M. S. Ramesh
- Screenplay by: M. S. Ramesh; R. Rajshekar
- Story by: M. S. Ramesh; R. Rajshekar
- Produced by: H. C. Srinivasa
- Starring: Shiva Rajkumar; Lakshmi Rai; Hrishitaa Bhatt
- Cinematography: Dasari Seenu
- Edited by: S. Manohar
- Music by: Gurukiran
- Production company: Shrinivasa Productions
- Release date: 29 July 2005
- Running time: 144 minutes
- Country: India
- Language: Kannada

Valmiki is a 2005 Indian Kannada-language drama film directed by M.S. Ramesh, and written by R. Rajshekar. The film stars Shiva Rajkumar, Lakshmi Rai and Hrishitaa Bhatt.

== Plot ==
Ram is an impulsive youngster but a good samaritan who despite being highly educated refuses to do any menial or low-pay jobs. He lives with his father, mother, two sisters and a younger brother. Aishwarya "Aishu" moves to their neighborhood and after initial clashes falls in love with Ram. However, he decides to only marry her after conducting his elder sister's marriage. He arranges her marriage with Ashok, a wealthy businessman who was helped by Ram at a crucial point. Ashok who is impressed by Ram also promises a job for him.

Ram's younger brother, Prakash, ends up killing, Kumar, an eve teaser after the latter tried to molest his sister. Ram who had early bashed up Kumar in the public for kissing his sister decides to take blame. He is, however, miraculously rescued by Criminal Lawyer Deshpande by proving that he is Bharamanna. Ram travels to a small village named Vyjayanthipura where he meets his mother, Mallavva, and fiancé Lakshmi. Deshpande reveals that Ram had lost his memory in the accident which caused him to be presumed dead. Lakshmi narrates the past events.

Vyjayanthipura has 2 landlords - Desai and Bharamanna's father, Basavaraj Patil. Desai with the help of M. P. Bhallala, S. P and D. C. manages to evacuate poor villages from their home so as to establish a profitable agro industry. When Basavaraj Patil threatens to drag them to court, he is branded as a naxalite and is killed in a fake encounter conducted by S. P. on the orders of Bhallala. Bharamanna, leaving behind his studies, returns from the city and with the support of his mother, Deshpande and the villagers decide to contest against Bhallala in the upcoming Parliament elections and even manages to get a confession from the S. P. and D. C. causing Desai to send goons to kill him. This resulted in an injured Bharamanna falling into the nearby water body and with his body not discovered being presumed dead.

Desai, who discovers that the person in the village is Ram kidnaps his father and brutally bashes him in front of Ram so as to prove that Ram is not Bharamanna when Mallavva reveals that they are two different persons. Deshpande reveals that it was him who with the support of Ram's father organised this drama in order to crush the empire of Desai. Desai leaves threatening to trap Ram in the murder case of Kumar. Ram manages to make the D. C. and S. P. testify against Desai and Bhallala as approver witnesses. While travelling to the court they are attacked by Desai, Bhallala and their henchmen despite which Ram manages to defeat them. Desai and Bhallala are killed in the process. The film ends with Ram contemplating on whether to remain as Bharamanna after listening to the request of Mallavva.

== Cast ==
- Shiva Rajkumar as Bharamanna / Ram
- Hrishitaa Bhatt as Aishwarya "Aishu"
- Lakshmi Rai as Lakshmi Deshpande
- Hema Chaudhary as Bharamanna's mother
- Srinivasa Murthy as Ram's father
- Rangayana Raghu as Ballanna
- Shobharaj as Desai
- Avinash as Adv. Deshpande
- Srinath as Basavaraj Patil

== Production ==
The climax was filmed at Ghaati Subrahmanya. Five cars, a bus and ten motorbikes were used during the shoot.

== Soundtrack ==
Valmiki

Film score by Gurukiran
- Released: 2005
- Genre: Soundtrack
- Producer: Gurukiran

All music is composed by Gurukiran

Track list
No.	Title	Singer(s)	Length
1.	"Ale Ale"	Rajesh Krishnan	4:02
2.	"Chumma Chumma"	Udit Narayan, K. S. Chithra	4:11
3.	"Maduve"	Gurukiran, Lakshmi	4:53
4.	"Marthanda Rupam"	S. P. Balasubrahmanyam	5:06
5.	"Tala Tala Hudugi"	Gurukiran, Sangeetha	4:13

== Reception ==
Indiaglitz wrote "The film's insipid story and bad narration is the major villain of the film. The slow narration in the second half of the film does not inspire the viewers". B. S. Srivani of Deccan Herald commended the film for its "taut screenplay" but felt it "goes awry mid-way" and added that the viewer is left "dissatisfied of the end product". She commended the performances of Shobaraj and Rangayana Raghu; the former for his performance as the local don Desai that he plays to "chilling perfection" and the latter for delivering a "neat, flawless performance." She concluded praising the Dasari Seenu's cinematography, the "beautifully choreographed" action sequences and Gurukiran's music in the film.
