= IQ (2023 film) =

- Release poster
- Directed by: GLB Srinivas
- Produced by: Kayagurala Lakshmipathi
- Starring: Sai Charan; Pallavi; Trancy
- Cinematography: T. Surendra Reddy
- Music by: Polur Ghatika Chalam
- Production company: K.L.P Movies
- Release date: 2 June 2023
- Running time: 122 minutes
- Country: India
- Language: Telugu

IQ is a 2023 Indian Telugu-language romantic drama film directed by GLB Srinivas and produced by Kayagurala Lakshmipathi under K.L.P Movies. The main lead cast is Sai Charan, Pallavi and Trancy. Sameer Datta played as an Antagonist and the Supporting characters are played by Suman, K. Lakshmipathi, Banerjee, Satya Prakash, Surya, Geetha Singh, Shaking Seshu, Abba TV Hari Prasad and Sathipandu. The movie was released theatrically on 2 June 2023.

== Cast ==
- Sai Charan as Vivek
- Pallavi as Bhumika
- Trancy
- Sameer Datta as Ajay
- Suman as Prakash Goud
- K.Lakshmipathi
- Banerjee
- Satya Prakash
- Surya as Doctor
- Palle Raghunath Reddy as District Collector
- Geetha Singh as Nurse
- Shaking Seshu as Constable
- Abba TV Hari Prasad
- Sathipandu

== Soundtrack ==
IQ

Soundtrack album by Polur Ghatika Chalam
- Released: 2023
- Recorded: 2022–2023
- Genre: Feature film soundtrack
- Language: Telugu
- Label: Tips Telugu
- Producer: Polur Ghatika Chalam

All music is composed by Polur Ghatika Chalam.

Tracklist
No.	Title	Lyrics	Singer(s)	Length
1.	"Kottandi Ro"	Varikuppala Yadagiri	Sravana Bhargavi, Varikuppala Yadagiri	4:21
2.	"Dandalayya"	P. Nagendra Prasad	Suresh	5:31
3.	"Kokkaro Ko Kokkaro Ko"	Varikuppala Yadagiri	Varikuppala Yadagiri	4:14

== Reception ==
A critic from Sakshi Post wrote that "A good movie with a good message has been made without compromises. 'IQ (Power of Students)' is laced with thrills and entertainment".
