= Saipriya Deva =

Indian actress

- Occupations: Actress, model

Saipriya Deva is an Indian actress who predominantly appears in Tamil cinema.

== Career ==
Deva's family has been in the film business for almost a century. Her great-grandfather started, and grandfather (V.M. Paramasiva Mudalier) was the owner of Sri Murugan Talkies in Mint. She made her acting debut in the 2017 Tamil film Shivalinga directed by P. Vasu. She also acted in Malayalam film Ente Ummante Peru (2018).

== Filmography ==
- Note: all films are in Tamil, unless otherwise noted.

Year	Film	Role	Notes
2017	Sivalinga	Sangeetha	
2018	Ente Ummante Peru	Sainaba	Malayalam film
2021	Boom Boom		
2022	Yutha Satham	Raghavi	
2023	Dinosaurs	Deepa	
2024	Pambattam	Nagamati	
