= Siva Sambo =

- Theatrical release poster
- Directed by: S. P. Bagavathy Bala
- Written by: S. P. Bagavathy Bala
- Produced by: Arumandhai Dr. Radhidevi; Kanji Arima Selva Kumar; S. P. Bagavathy Bala
- Starring: C. B. Thil Natraj; Shivani
- Cinematography: Magi Bala
- Edited by: Lakhsman
- Music by: Songs: A. C. John Peter; Score: Deva
- Production company: S Films
- Release date: 20 February 2026
- Country: India
- Language: Tamil

Siva Sambo is a 2026 Indian Tamil-language romantic thriller film written, produced, and directed by S. P. Bagavathy Bala , who costars alongside C. B. Thil Natraj and Shivani. The songs were composed by A. C. John Peter and the film was released on 20 February 2026.

== Cast ==
- C. B. Thil Natraj as Arjun
- Shivani as Shivani
- Senthil as Minor Kunju
- Imman Annachi as London bridegroom
- Trichi Sathana
- Sarabambu Subburaj
- Bagavathy Bala

== Production ==
The film is written and directed by S. P. Bagavathy Bala. It is produced by Arumandhai Dr. Radhidevi, Kanji Arima Selva Kumar, and S. P. Bagavathy Bala under S Films. Cinematography is handled by Magi Bala, while editing is done by Lakhsman. The music for the film is composed by Deva.

== Reception ==
Maalai Malar critic wrote that director Bhagavathy Bala has presented a crime thriller film about a case of cheating where a single person marries multiple women in crimes against women. The critic added that there are flaws in the film.

Virakesari critic stated that senior actor Senthil appears in a couple of scenes and makes his presence felt among the audience.
