= Badava =

2025 Tamil film by KV Nandha

- Theatrical release poster
- Directed by: KV Nandha
- Written by: KV Nandha
- Produced by: M. John Peter
- Starring: Vimal; Soori; Shrita Rao; Ramachandra Raju
- Cinematography: Ramalingam
- Edited by: Vinoth Kanna
- Music by: M. John Peter
- Production company: J Studio International
- Release date: 7 March 2025
- Country: India
- Language: Tamil

Badava is a 2025 Indian Tamil-language action comedy film written and directed by KV Nandha, starring Vimal and Soori in the lead roles alongside Shrita Rao, Ramachandra Raju, Devadarshini, Namo Narayana, Senthil, Vinodhini Vaidyanathan, Saravana Sakthi and others in important roles. The film is produced by John Peter under his J Studio International banner.

Badava released in theatres on 7 March 2025 to mixed reviews.

== Plot ==
A jobless troublemaker is forced to move to Malaysia for work, only to lose his job and return home. Meanwhile, a powerful brick kiln owner enslaves the local population. The story follows how the hero rises to the challenge, using his courage to free the people and restore joy to the community.

== Cast ==
- Vimal as Velan
- Soori as Urappu
- Shrita Rao as Shrita
- Ramachandra Raju as Valava
- Devadarshini as Selvi
- Namo Narayana as Selvi's husband
- Vinodhini Vaidyanathan as Collector
- Saravana Sakthi as Village Man
- KPY Ramar as Mani
- Chaams as Bar customer

== Production ==
After the success of the long-shelved film Madha Gaja Raja (2025), the Vimal-Soori starrer film Badava written and directed by KV Nandha was planned to release in 2025. The film that got production completed six years ago is produced by John Peter under his J Studio International banner, starring Ramachandra Raju, Shrita Rao, Devadarshini, Namo Narayana, Senthil, Vinodhini Vaidyanathan, Saravana Sakthi and others in important roles. The technical team consists of M. John Peter as the music composer, Ramalingam as the cinematographer, Vinoth Kanna as the editor, Saravana Abiraman as the art director, Dinesh, Sreedhar, and Dheena handling the dance choreography and 'Siruthai' Ganesh handling the stunt choreography.

== Music ==
The film has music composed by M. John Peter.

Track listing
No.	Title	Lyrics	Singer(s)	Length
1.	"Retta Jadayila"	M. John Peter	Harihara Sudhan	3:34
2.	"Onnum Thonala"	Viveka	Sivaangi Krishnakumar, Deepak Blue	3:56
3.	"Achcham Naanam Vittu Poga"	Viveka	Vijay Yesudas, Vinaitha	3:50
4.	"Aruvala Eduda"	Kabilan Vairamuthu	Pavan, Vallavan, Velu	4:19
5.	"Badava Badava"	Ilaya Kamban	Velmurugan, Rajini Babu	3:08
6.	"Kottudhe Vaanam"	Swarnalatha	Velu, Rathi Sangar	3:25
Total length:				22:12

== Release and reception ==
Badava released in theatres on 7 March 2025. Initially the film was planned to release in October 2024, but was later scheduled for 14 February 2025. A critic of Hindu Tamil Thisai reviewed the film lauding it for its social message about protecting Mesquite trees, while criticizing the screenplay and illogical sequences. The film was also reviewed by Dinamalar.
