= Pondy Ravi =

Indian actor

- Other name: Sembi
- Education: Pondicherry University
- Occupation: Film actor
- Years active: 1999–present

Pondy Ravi is an Indian actor who works predominantly in Tamil-language films. He has acted in over sixty films.

== Career ==
Pondy Ravi worked as an assistant cameraman for Minsara Kanavu (1997). He has acted as a police officer in several films including Alaipayuthey (2000), Minnale (2001) and Kaakha Kaakha (2003). He also portrayed a lead role in a film called Saamida (2008) under the name Sembi; the film had a low-key release. He went to an audition for Ang Lee's Life of Pi (2013). In the film, he plays a silent police officer who regulates traffic. Ravi portrayed a corrupt police officer in Vajram (2015) who acts on behalf of a minister for the sake of money. Outside acting, Ravi manages a video lab and is a liaison for films shot in Pondicherry.

== Personal life ==
His father is a theatre artiste in Neyveli.

== Partial filmography ==
Uncredited roles

Year	Film	Role	Notes
1999	Jodi	Journalist	
2000	Alaipayuthey	Police officer	
2001	Citizen	Citizen's friend	
2003	Parthiban Kanavu	Worker in Kalyana Sundaram's friend's company	
2003	Iyarkai	Dorai's posse member	
2005	Ghajini	Bus conductor	

Credited roles

Year	Film	Role	Notes
2001	Dheena	MLA Malarvannan's Henchman	credited as Ravi
2001	Minnale	Ravi	
2002	Kannathil Muthamittal	Dhanraj	
2002	Ramanaa	Dead patient's husband	
2003	Sena	Pondy	
2003	Kaakha Kaakha	Kaththa Muthu	
2003	Soori	Surya's friend	
2004	Ghilli	Police officer	
2004	Machi	Narayanan's henchman	
2004	Bose	Commando	
2005	Chandramukhi	Ganesh Constructions worker	
2005	Kana Kandaen	Durai	
2005	Daas	Makkal Theerpu reporter	
2005	Kundakka Mandakka	Police officer	
2006	Naalai	Bose	credited as Sembi
2008	Saamida	Saami	credited as Sembi
2010	Sivappu Mazhai	Lakshman	
2012	Life of Pi	Traffic police officer	English film
2013	Singam II	Police officer	
2013	Thagaraaru	Police officer	
2014	Jilla	Police officer	
2014	Poojai	Anna Thandavam's henchman	
2014	Oru Oorla Rendu Raja	Police officer	
2014	Meaghamann	Yakub	
2015	Yennai Arindhaal	Police constable	
2015	Vajram	Police officer	
2015	Tihar	Henchman	
2016	Tamilselvanum Thaniyar Anjalum		
2017	Ivan Thanthiran	Devaraj's right hand	
2018	Touch Chesi Chudu	Navy officer	Telugu film
2018	Kaala Koothu		
2018	Saamy 2	Ravana's Personal Assistant	
2019	Natpe Thunai	Abdul Marakkayar	
2019	Sangathamizhan	Sanjay's assistant	
2021	IPC 376	Assistant Commissioner	
2021	Tughlaq Durbar	Investigation officer	
2021	Theerpugal Virkapadum	Advocate	
2022	Visithiran	Police officer	
2022	Vikram	S. Pandidurai	
2022	Prince	Sub-inspector	
2023	Varisu	Eeshwar	
2023	Bakasuran	Natarajan's assistant	
2023	Ayothi	Cargo Manager	
2023	Ponniyin Selvan 2	PP Commander	
2024	Rathnam	Babu Reddy	
2024	Lal Salaam	Allaudin Bhai	
2024	Thiru. Manickam	Constable Esakki	
2024	Boat	Indian Imperial Police officer	
2025	Vanangaan	Manikandan	
2025	The Door	Contractor	
2025	Unpaarvaiyil	Inbasekharan	
2025	Divya Drusthi		Telugu film
2026	Lucky the Superstar	Politician	

=== Television ===
Year	Show	Role	Notes	Channel
2019	Sathya	Veerasingam	Replaced by 'Poraali' Dileepan	Zee Tamil
2020–2022	Senthoora Poove	Pandian		Star Vijay
2021–2022	Kannana Kanne	Harichandran		Sun TV
2021	Vaidhegi Kaathirundhaal	Subburathnam		Star Vijay
2023–present	Pandian Stores 2	Sakthivel		Star Vijay
2023	Sundari	Murugan's friend	Special appearance	Sun TV
2024	Baakiyalakshmi	Sakthivel	Special appearance	Star Vijay
2024	Karthigai Deepam	Thungaa		Zee Tamil
2025–2026	Magale En Marumagale	Paranjothi		Star Vijay
2026	Samanthi	MLA Kaalaipandiyan	Cameo appearance	Zee Tamil
