= Mynaa =

2010 film by Prabhu Solomon

- Theatrical release poster
- Directed by: Prabhu Solomon
- Written by: Prabhu Solomon
- Produced by: John Max
- Starring: Vidharth; Amala Paul
- Cinematography: M. Sukumar
- Edited by: L. V. K. Doss
- Music by: D. Imman
- Production company: Shalom Studios
- Distributed by: AGS Entertainment; Red Giant Movies
- Release date: 5 November 2010
- Running time: 146 minutes
- Country: India
- Language: Tamil
- Budget: ₹ 5 crore

Mynaa is a 2010 Indian Tamil-language romantic action drama film directed and written by Prabhu Solomon. Jointly distributed by Udhayanidhi Stalin and Kalpathi S. Aghoram, it stars Vidharth and Amala Paul, while Sethu and Thambi Ramaiah play supporting roles. The soundtrack by D. Imman garnered much anticipation prior to release, on 5 November 2010, coinciding with the Diwali festival.

The film received critical acclaim and won the Best Film Award at the 58th Filmfare Awards South. Ramaiah went on to win the National Film Award for Best Supporting Actor in 2011. Mynaa became a major success and ended as a blockbuster among the 2010 Diwali releases and was released along with Dhanush's Uthamaputhiran. The core plot was reported to be loosely inspired by the 2006 Hong Kong film Dog Bite Dog. This film was officially remade in Bangladesh as Poramon (2013) directed by Jakir Hossain Raju.

== Plot ==
A convict named Suruli recalls his love for Mynaa since childhood, which becomes more intense as they grow. When Suruli was 15, he dropped out of school and became an unofficial cleaner on the jeep ferry in his village. He sees 11-year-old Mynaa and her widowed mother being thrown out of their house due to a lack of rent. Suruli becomes attracted to her as she picks her books first from the mess.

He takes the duo to his village and arranges for them to stay in a home. He also gets Mynaa into the school from which he eloped, and she keeps studying. Eight years later, Suruli is a hardworking coolie in the neighbouring town, and Mynaa is preparing for her +2 exams. She attains puberty, and love blossoms between them, which is despised by Mynaa's mother, who sees Suruli as an unworthy groom. Though Mynaa's mother assures Suruli that she will arrange their marriage, she changes her mind and arranges for Mynaa to marry a man working in Dubai. Infuriated, Suruli threatens to kill her and throws a stone near her head. He is arrested by the police and given a 15-day prison sentence for the murder threat. Mynaa's mother arranges the marriage on the 14th day (on Diwali), one day before his release.

Here comes the story of sub-jail in-charge DSP Bhaskar and Head Constable Ramaiah (Thambi Ramaiah). Bhaskar married Sudha, the daughter of a very rich landlord. She has three elder brothers who adore her. Ramaiah is a happily married man who loves his wife but is childless. The jail is decorated for the pre-Diwali function, but after the function, Suruli is found to be missing. The jail staff is shocked because if something happens to him outside the jail, or if Bhaskar cannot produce him for court after Diwali, they will all face severe charges. The district jail chief gives Bhaskar a day to bring him back. Meanwhile, Bhaskar was to immediately take Sudha to Madurai to complete their Diwali shopping with her family, as this Diwali was his Thalai Diwali. (Note: Thalai Diwali is the first Diwali of a married couple and a very special occasion in Tamil Nadu.) To save his job, he secretly quits this tradition and goes to Suruli's village with Ramaiah.

Suruli reaches Mynaa's house by midnight, but her mother locks herself and Mynaa inside and blackmails that if Suruli tries to come in by force, she will immolate Mynaa. Suruli waits patiently outside for the groom's family. Bhaskar and Ramaiah reach the nearest small town to Suruli's village and are forced to travel on foot. They reach his village by morning. As the groom comes, Mynaa's mother comes out and blames Suruli for forcing her daughter. Mynaa refuses, and the marriage is called off. Mynaa's mother attempts to kill the duo, but Bhaskar saves them and handcuffs Suruli. Mynaa decides to proceed along with them.

On their way, they encounter more adventures, including being chased by an elephant and getting lost, thereby reaching Kerala. From there, their journey continues, with Bhaskar becoming infuriated with Suruli because he cannot celebrate his first Diwali, busy running behind Suruli. He promises to give him hell once he is back in prison. A parallel story reveals Sudha and her brothers troubling Bhaskar to come to their hometown for the festival. However, Bhaskar soon develops a soft corner for Suruli as he saves him from a freak bus accident. The four go back to their hometown together. Bhaskar promises to get Suruli released within two days and assures to get them married after Suruli is released. Ramaiah asks Mynaa to stay in his house for shelter. However, Bhaskar asks Ramaiah to let Mynaa stay in his house so that he can take her to the wedding safely the next day. On reaching his house, Bhaskar finds Sudha waiting furiously. She also accuses Mynaa of having an illegitimate relationship with Bhaskar, who scolds his wife in anger, following which she leaves the home.

The next day, Bhaskar, Ramaiah, and Suruli, while on the way to court, find a dead body on the railway track and are shocked, seeing it to be Mynaa. Bhaskar finds out that Sudha's brothers arrived at their house immediately and beat Mynaa to death, whom they thought was responsible for the trouble. They then threw her body on a railway track. Upon witnessing this, Suruli gets depressed, jumps in front of another train, and dies. Bhaskar feels guilty about the incident and becomes enraged. He quits his job, goes back to his wife's home, and kills her and her brothers. He then voluntarily surrenders and is imprisoned for 20 years in Suruli's cell.

== Cast ==
- Vidharth as Suruli
- Amala Paul as Mynaa, Suruli's love interest
- Sethu as Bhaskar
- Prabhu as Rajendran
- Thambi Ramaiah as Ramaiah
- G. M. Kumar as Karunakaran
- Suzane George as Sudha Bhaskar
- Semmalar Annam as Vasundhara
- Sevvalai Rasu as Mayi
- Karthik as Mandoadu Manickam
- Vengaiya Balan as Kumbudu Gurusamy
- Hello Kandasamy
- Nagesh Raja as Flipkart employee
- Venkatesh as Police Officer

== Production ==
After completing the script, Prabu Solomon travelled 7,000 kilometres covering 26 towns across Tamil Nadu, Kerala, Andhra Pradesh and Karnataka as he wanted to find a location filled with dense forests and surrounded hills. He finally found it in Kurangani, a town 30 kilometers from the municipality of Bodinayakkanur in Theni district.

Realising that well-known actors would be hesitant to stay in a remote place, Solomon decided to make the film with newcomers. It took Solomon 6 months to finalise the cast and crew. The film was shot in natural light and without any make-up being used for the actors. Due to the remoteness of the shooting location, the crew members had to trek 7 kilometres daily. Despite this, the principal photography was completed in 78 days.

== Soundtrack ==
The film score and soundtrack for Mynaa were composed by D. Imman, collaborating with director Prabhu Solomon for the second time after Lee. The album was released on 27 September 2010. The songs, especially the title track, became very popular, while the album was widely considered Imman's finest work yet. The songs "Kaiya Pudi" and "Neeyum Naanum" were called out by journalists for their similarities to the songs "Can I Have This Dance" and "Right Here, Right Now" from High School Musical 3: Senior Year (2008).

Track listing
No.	Title	Lyrics	Singer(s)	Length
1.	"Mynaa Mynaa"	Yugabharathi	Shaan	04:35
2.	"Kichu Kichu Thambalam"	Yugabharathi	Baby Harini, Sriranjani, S. Srimathi, G. Aathireya, Lakshman Aravind, Solar Sai	04:16
3.	"Neeyum Naanum"	Eknaath	Benny Dayal, Shreya Ghoshal	04:57
4.	"Jingu Chikka"	Yugabharathi	Solar Sai, Kalpana Raghavendar	03:55
5.	"Kaiya Pudi"	Yugabharathi	Naresh Iyer, Sadhana Sargam	04:03
Total length:				19:20

== Reception ==
Rediff wrote, "With plenty of realism, a touch of angst and sparkling humour not to mention the hills of Theni themselves, Mynaa is an interesting romantic journey".

== Other versions ==
The film was dubbed in Telugu as Prema Khaidi, and remade in Kannada in 2011 as Shyloo. A Hindi remake was going to be directed by Prabhu Solomon, but never materialised.

== Awards ==
Ceremony	Category	Name	Outcome
58th National Film Awards	National Film Award for Best Supporting Actor	Thambi Ramaiah	Won
58th Filmfare Awards South	Filmfare Award for Best Film - Tamil	Shalom Studios	Won
58th Filmfare Awards South	Filmfare Award for Best Director - Tamil	Prabu Solomon	Nominated
58th Filmfare Awards South	Filmfare Award for Best Actress – Tamil	Amala Paul	Nominated
58th Filmfare Awards South	Filmfare Award for Best Supporting Actor - Tamil	Thambi Ramaiah	Nominated
5th Vijay Awards	Vijay Award for Best Debut Actress	Amala Paul	Won
5th Vijay Awards	Vijay Award for Best Actress	Amala Paul	Nominated
5th Vijay Awards	Vijay Award for Best Supporting Actor	Thambi Ramaiah	Won
5th Vijay Awards	Vijay Award for Best Supporting Actress	Susan George	Nominated
5th Vijay Awards	Vijay Award for Best Debut Actor	Vidharth	Won
5th Vijay Awards	Vijay Award for Best Cinematographer	Sukumar	Nominated
5th Vijay Awards	Vijay Award for Best Story, Screenplay Writer	Prabu Solomon	Won
5th Vijay Awards	Vijay Award for Best Crew	Shalom Studios	Won
2nd Edison Awards	Best Debut Actress	Amala Paul	Won
Tamil Nadu State Film Awards	Best Film	Shalom Studios	Won

== See also ==
- Poramon, a 2013 Bangladeshi remake

== Bibliography ==
- Dhananjayan, G. (2014). Pride of Tamil Cinema: 1931 to 2013. Blue Ocean Publishers.
