= Kaviyam =

- Directed by: M. Ponraj
- Written by: M. Ponraj
- Produced by: Manjil Pradhan
- Starring: Ruban George; Nandhini
- Cinematography: Dharma
- Edited by: R. T. Annadurai
- Music by: M. Ponraj
- Production company: Aarthi Film Circuit
- Release date: 18 February 1994
- Running time: 135 minutes
- Country: India
- Language: Tamil

Kaviyam (/ˈkɑːvɪjəm/ transl. Masterpiece) is a 1994 Indian Tamil-language film directed by M. Ponraj. The film stars newcomer Ruban George and Nandhini, with newcomers Salomon, Thamizhan, M. Ponraj and Vennira Aadai Moorthy playing supporting roles. It was released on 18 February 1994.

== Plot ==
The film begins with the cancellation of a wedding. The bride Shanthi refuses to marry the groom Kumar who wanted a large dowry and she humiliates him. Shanthi and Kumar are doctors in the same hospital. Shanthi challenges him to marry a better groom who will not ask her for any dowry. Raja is a villager who comes to the city searching for work. In town, Raja befriends Vaithi, who accommodates him in his lodge. One night, Raja finds an old man who gets struck by lightning and he brings that old man to his daughter Shanthi but the old man dies on the way. Thereafter, Raja becomes a traffic police and he falls in love with Shanthi. When Raja expresses his love to Shanthi, she rejects it. Shanthi slowly develops a soft corner for the kind-hearted Raja. What transpires later forms the crux of the story.

== Cast ==
- Ruban George as Raja
- Nandhini as Shanthi
- Salomon as Kumar
- Thamizhan as Santhanam
- M. Ponraj as Vaithi
- Vennira Aadai Moorthy
- Thayir Vadai Desikan
- Kambar Jayaraman as Shanthi's grandfather
- Brinda
- Beena
- Sulakshana
- Kanal Kannan

== Soundtrack ==
The soundtrack was composed by the director Ponraj, with lyrics written by Salomon.

Song	Singer(s)	Duration
"Thittikkum Maragathame"	Mano, Chorus	3:50
"Kasu Panam"	Malaysia Vasudevan, Chorus	5:09
"Nee Iravu"	S. P. Balasubrahmanyam	4:45
"Maalai Nilavae"	Mano, S. Janaki	5:05
"Unnuruvam"	Mano	4:33

== Reception ==
Malini Mannath wrote for The Indian Express that though she had low expectations for the film, it "turns out to be not so bad after all". Thulasi of Kalki wrote having a beautiful knot of love story between doctor and traffic cop, in every scene, there's laziness instead of speed, there's traffic in the place of emotional space.
