= Pambattam =

- Theatrical release poster
- Directed by: V. C. Vadivudaiyan
- Written by: V. C. Vadivudaiyan
- Produced by: V. Palanivel
- Starring: Jeevan; Mallika Sherawat; Rittika Sen; Saipriya Deva; V. C. Vadivudaiyan
- Cinematography: Iniyan J Haris
- Edited by: Suresh Urs
- Music by: Amresh Ganesh
- Production company: Vaithiyanathan Film Garden
- Release date: 23 February 2024
- Country: India
- Language: Tamil

Pambattam (transl. Snake dance) is a 2024 Indian Tamil-language horror thriller film directed by V. C. Vadivudaiyan and starring himself, Jeevan, Mallika Sherawat, Rittika Sen, and Saipriya Deva. The film was released after a four-year delay to highly negative reviews. The film was dubbed in Hindi as Naagmati, which had a direct-to-television release on 21 September 2023 on Zee Cinema prior to the theatrical release of the Tamil version.

== Cast ==
- Jeevan as R. Boominathan / Saravanan
- Mallika Sherawat as Mangamma Devi
- Suman as Police Officer
- Rittika Sen as Radhika
- Saipriya Deva as Nagamati
- V. C. Vadivudaiyan as K. Kali
- Salil Ankola
- Saravanan
- Rikin
- Livingston as Thief
- Ramesh Khanna as Police Officer
- Saravana Sakthi as Police Officer
- Karate Raja as Police Officer
- Niyamat Khan
- Andrea Kurunathan

== Production ==
The film began production in January 2020 and Jeevan accepted to star after listening to three of V. C. Vadivudaiyan's scripts. This film marked his comeback to films after a five-year gap. The film was planned as a multilingual film with the Hindi version titled as Naagmati. Mallika Sherawat plays a queen in the film, which marks her return to Tamil cinema after a twelve-year gap. Sherawat joined the sets in February 2021 during the second schedule and shot some of her dialogues in Hindi. A dungeon set was made at Binny Mills in Chennai. The stunts were choreographed by Super Subbarayan. Jeevan sustained several injuries including burns from torches falling in a narrow passage and a hairline muscle tear from falling through gaps between beds while rolling sideways on the ground. At the film's trailer launch, Saipriya Deva said that she signed the film as a heroine but lamented about how her name was disregarded from promotional material.

== Reception ==
A critic from The Times of India rated the film 1 1/2 out of 5 and wrote that "The overall vibe of Pambattam is jaded and even comical. The scenes that are supposed to be pretty serious, like a marriage by abduction and even the death of one of the important characters, just don't make you feel any kind of emotion". A critic from Dinakaran wrote that the director delivered the film in the old formula of telling a historical story and then combining it with a social story.
