= Ragasiya Snehithane =

- Title card
- Directed by: Sujo Visanth
- Written by: Sujo Visanth
- Produced by: L. Srinivasan; K. Mahendran Naidu; M. T. Srinivasan Naidu
- Starring: Vasanth; Lakshmi Rai; Vijay Raj; Prakash; Kandan; Sriram
- Cinematography: K. G. Sankar
- Edited by: R. T. Annadurai
- Music by: John Peter
- Production company: Revathy Movie Makers
- Release date: 22 August 2008
- Running time: 120 minutes
- Country: India
- Language: Tamil

Ragasiya Snehithane (transl. Secret companion) is a 2008 Indian Tamil-language slasher film written and directed by Sujo Visanth. The film stars Lakshmi Rai along with newcomers Vasanth, Vijayraj, Prakash, Kandan, and Sriram, with Jayasurya, Charan Raj, Mahanadi Shankar, Sethu Vinayagam, Hemalatha, Gowthami Vembunathan, M. S. Bhaskar, Pandu, Crane Manohar, and Bava Lakshmanan playing supporting roles. The film had music by John Peter. The film was released on 22 August 2008 after many delays. The film's title is based on a lyric from the song "Snegithane" in Alai Payuthey (2000).

== Plot ==
After graduating from college, Vasanth, Vijay, Arun and Karthik have decided to stay in their rented house in Chennai while their friend Sakthi returns to his native village. Vasanth's girlfriend Jennifer then comes to live with them. Later, Sakthi returns to the city and begins to behave strangely. Meanwhile, the rowdy Jayasurya is sought by the police. Jennifer, who bumps into Jayasurya at the local market, informs the police, and the police inspector arrests Jayasurya.

The six jobless friends are desperate to find a decent job and decide to steal from a minister who had black money. Posing as income tax officers, they conduct a surprise raid at the minister's house during his absence and secretly rob ₹30 crore (equivalent to ₹91 crore or US$9.5 million in 2026). The minister then finds out the identities of the robbers. Meanwhile, Jayasurya escapes from jail with the help of the corrupt sub-inspector Shankar, and the minister gives Jayasurya the mission of killing the six people.

The friends are now hiding in a forest near Talakonam waterfalls. Jayasurya, who eventually finds their place, attacks Sakthi when he was swimming alone in the falls. Later that night, the five friends find Sakthi's wounded body. Upset by the demise of their friend, they bury him with his share of the stolen money. Thereafter, Karthik, Arun, and Vijay are mysteriously murdered one by one. The killer turns out to be Sakthi.

In the past, Sakthi and his sister were ill-treated by their greedy stepmother. His sister had to prostitute herself to pay his college fees. When he returned to his native village, Sakthi found his sister having sex with another man and was shocked. Sakthi later killed the man and slowly turned into a psychopath who could do anything for money. In the forest, Sakthi faked his own death with the help of Jayasurya. He then killed Jayasurya and started killing his friends one by one.

Sakthi finally murders Jennifer and then reveals everything to the lone survivor Vasanth. In the meantime, Shankar comes to the forest with Sakthi's sister in order to steal their money. During the fight, Sakthi manages to kill Shankar, and his sister tries to convince him to stop his killing rampage. Sakthi, who is in a psychotic state, does not listen to her and tries to kill Vasanth. Sakthi's sister has no other choice but to kill Sakthi.

== Cast ==
- Vasanth as Vasanth
- Lakshmi Rai as Jennifer
- Vijayraj as Vijay
- Prakash as Arun
- Kandan as Karthik
- Sriram as Sakthi
- Jayasurya as Jayasurya
- Mahanadi Shankar as Sub-Inspector Shankar
- Sethu Vinayagam as Minister
- Hemalatha as Sakthi's sister
- Gowthami Vembunathan as Sakthi's stepmother
- M. S. Bhaskar as Minister's friend
- Pandu as College Principal
- Crane Manohar as Office Manager
- Bava Lakshmanan as Nair
- Megha
- Hasina
- Muthu
- P. Venkatesh
- V. Akilan
- Charan Raj as Police inspector (guest appearance)

== Production ==
Newcomer Sujo Visanth began work on a horror film titled Kurukkezhuthu in 2004, writing the story, screenplay and dialogues for the project. Many newcomers were chosen to play the lead roles. The film was shot in Chennai and Talakonam. Lakshmi Rai, who hailed from Belgaum, was cast to play the heroine and it was supposed to be her first film. The film was prominently shot in Chennai and Andhra Pradesh. In 2005, the title was changed from Kurukkezhuthu to Azhagiya Aabathu and the film remained unreleased for unknown reasons. Prior to the 2008 release, the title was changed to Ragasiye Snehithane, based on a lyric from the song "Snegithane" from Alai Payuthey (2000).

== Soundtrack ==
The soundtrack was composed by John Peter.

Track listing
No.	Title	Lyrics	Singer(s)	Length
1.	"Iravu Thoongalam"	Kadhal Mathi	Ram, Nisha	4:26
2.	"Kaadhal Seidhal"	John Peter	Timmy	3:32
3.	"Dhil Chaliya"	John Peter	Dr. Narayanan, Padma	5:06
4.	"Thuppakki"	Kadhal Mathi	Gopal Rao, Swarnalatha	3:34
5.	"Vasantha Kalangal"	John Peter	Harish Raghavendra, Priya	5:05
Total length:				21:43
