= Vanjagan =

- Directed by: A. M. Baskar
- Written by: A. M. Baskar
- Produced by: S. V. Jayaprakash Radhai
- Starring: Sujibala; Prathap; Suman
- Cinematography: K. G. Shankar
- Edited by: R. T. Annadurai
- Music by: John Peter
- Production company: Veera Films
- Release date: 4 August 2006
- Running time: 115 minutes
- Country: India
- Language: Tamil

Vanjagan (transl. Crook) is a 2006 Indian Tamil language thriller film directed by A. M. Baskar. The film stars Sujibala, newcomer Prathap and Suman, with Senthil, Pandu, Chinni Jayanth, Chandrahassan Jayaprakash, Vaiyapuri and Maaran playing supporting roles. The film, produced by S. V. Jayaprakash Radhai, was released on 4 August 2006.

== Plot ==
The film begins with a disfigured man running with a suitcase and three rowdies chasing him. The man then throws the suitcase into a nearby flat. The newspaper reporter Jeeva witnesses the whole incident from her flat, she then takes that suitcase and brings it at her house. When she opens the suitcase, she finds a diary in it where it is written that the murders of four influential persons in the city will happen soon. When she informs the police about this, the police didn't take the matter seriously. So Jeeva and her boyfriend Siva, a private detective, begins to investigate to find the murderer.

After the murders of Arunachalam and Panneerselvam, the two influential persons who were mentioned in the diary, the police decides to conduct its investigation with the help of Jeeva and Siva. Jeeva writes a press article about the three rowdies with their photos and concludes that the rowdies killed the two influential persons. The three rowdies then call her to threaten her but she refuses to remove the press article. Later, rowdies kidnap Jeeva and sequester her, an auto-driver saves her and admits her in the nearby hospital. Arrested by the police, the three rowdies reveal that they chased the disfigured man thinking that the suitcase was containing money but the man named Cutting Bhaskar, also a rowdy, told them that there was no money in the suitcase so in anger, they brutally kill him and ran away. Siva finds a similarity between the two murders: five minutes before they were killed, the victims get a call from the same phone number. The police track down the home address of the owner of the phone number and discovers a dead body at that address. Siva later reveals that the auto driver was, in fact, his senior Suman and secretly works in this case. Chinrasu is found dead with bullet wounds.

Siva finally finds the fourth victim's home address but when the police arrive at the place, Thirunavukkarasu is found dead. The police then arrest the two suspects: Veera and Ravi who murdered the four persons. The two become mentally handicapped persons after an incident that upended their lives. Veera was a teenager who lived with his parents and beloved sister. His father deposited all his savings in a chit fund company for his daughter's marriage but one day, the chit fund company employees swindled their money and escaped. Thereafter, Veera's family committed suicide. Ravi was also a victim of this scam. Together, they decided to kill the four employees of that fake chit fund company. In view of their mental health, the court judge sends them to a mental asylum.

== Cast ==
- Sujibala as Jeeva
- Prathap as Siva
- Suman
- Senthil
- Pandu as Police constable
- Chinni Jayanth as a Police constable
- Chandrahassan Jayaprakash as Veera
- Vaiyapuri as Ravi
- Maaran as a Police constable
- Devan as Arunachalam
- Ajay Rathnam as Chinrasu
- Sethu Vinayagam as Panneerselvam
- Azhagu as Thirunavukkarasu
- Mahanadi Shankar as Bala
- Balu Anand as Avudaiyappan
- Achamillai Gopi as Lawyer
- Kottachi as Kottachi
- Crane Manohar
- Shakeela as a Police constable
- Subramanian Gopalakrishnan in an uncredited role

== Soundtrack ==
Vanjagan

Soundtrack album by John Peter
- Released: 2006
- Recorded: 2006
- Genre: Feature film soundtrack
- Length: 24:04
- Producer: John Peter

The film score and the soundtrack were composed by John Peter. The soundtrack, released in 2006, features 5 tracks with lyrics written by Ponnadiyan, P. Vijay and Kalaikumar.

Track	Song	Duration
1	"MGR Sivaji Rajini Kamal"	2:50
2	"Chinna Mama"	2:42
3	"Adiye Anjala"	3:49
4	"Madurai Pakka Marikozhundhu"	4:15
5	"Meghame"	4:01

== Reception ==
Malini Mannath of Chennai Online wrote that "The murder suspense thriller is so badly made that it is unintentionally funny".
