= Sethu Vinayagam =

Indian stage and film actor (1948–2009)

- Born: Sethu Vinayagam; 18 August 1949
- Died: 20 September 2009 (aged 60)
- Occupation: Actor
- Years active: 1981–2009

Sethu Vinayagam (18 August 1949 – 20 September 2009) was an Indian actor who worked in Tamil films and plays.

== Career ==
He was a member of Visu's drama troupe and mostly seen in all of Visu's films. He appeared in over 100 films and plays and made his mark as a villain, playing supporting roles in many films.

His notable movies include Thillu Mullu, Puthiya Theerppu, Oorkavalan, Sathya, Mangai Oru Gangai, Penmani Aval Kanmani, Palaivana Paravaigal, Gunaa, Magalir Mattum and Baashha.

== Personal life ==
Sethu Vinayagam was married and had three daughters.

== Death ==
Sethu Vinayagam died on 20 September 2009 at the age of 60 due to prolonged sickness.

== Filmography ==
This is a partial filmography. You can expand it.

=== 1980s ===
| Year | Film | Role | Notes |
|---|---|---|---|
| 1981 | Thillu Mullu | Chandran's friend | |
| 1984 | Vaai Sollil Veeranadi | | |
| 1984 | Naanayam Illatha Naanayam | Aandavar's PA | |
| 1984 | Simma Soppanam | | |
| 1984 | Rajathanthiram | Viswanatha Boopathy | |
| 1984 | Puyal Kadantha Bhoomi | Rameshbabu | |
| 1985 | Puthiya Theerpu | | |
| 1985 | Raja Yuvaraja | | |
| 1985 | Chidambara Rahasiyam | Inspector | |
| 1985 | Ketti Melam | Police officer | |
| 1986 | Yaaro Ezhuthiya Kavithai | | |
| 1987 | Manithanin Marupakkam | | |
| 1987 | Oor Kavalan | | |
| 1987 | Kavalan Avan Kovalan | Sethu | |
| 1987 | Mangai Oru Gangai | | |
| 1987 | Penmani Aval Kanmani | | |
| 1988 | Sathya | Mariappa's assistant | |
| 1988 | Urimai Geetham | | |
| 1988 | Mappillai Sir | | |
| 1988 | Oruvar Vaazhum Aalayam | | |
| 1988 | Puthiya Vaanam | | |
| 1988 | Dhayam Onnu | | |

=== 1990s ===
| Year | Film | Role | Notes |
| 1990 | Velai Kidaichuduchu | | |
| 1990 | Palaivana Paravaigal | Advocate | |
| 1990 | Kaavalukku Kettikkaran | | |
| 1990 | Nalla Kaalam Porandaachu | | |
| 1991 | Naadu Adhai Naadu | | |
| 1991 | Adhikari | | |
| 1991 | Anbu Sangili | | |
| 1991 | Idhaya Vaasal | | |
| 1991 | Gunaa | | |
| 1992 | Pattathu Raani | | |
| 1992 | Samundi | | |
| 1992 | Vaaname Ellai | | |
| 1993 | Maravan | | |
| 1993 | Uthama Raasa | | |
| 1993 | Naalaya Seidhi | | |
| 1993 | Mutrugai | | |
| 1994 | Magalir Mattum | Police inspector | |
| 1994 | Sathyavan | | |
| 1994 | Sadhu | | |
| 1995 | Baashha | College chairman | |
| 1996 | Aruva Velu | | |
| 1996 | Coimbatore Mappillai | | |
| 1996 | Take It Easy Urvashi | | |
| 1996 | Sengottai | | |
| 1998 | Ulavuthurai | Krishnamoorthy's boss | |

=== 2000s ===
| Year | Film | Role | Notes |
| 2000 | Uyirile Kalanthathu | | |
| 2000 | Mugavaree | Film producer | |
| 2001 | Sigamani Ramamani | | |
| 2001 | Aanandham | Susheela's father | |
| 2001 | Citizen | Minister | |
| 2003 | Vadakku Vaasal | | |
| 2003 | Saamy | Aarusaamy's suitor's father | |
| 2003 | Thithikudhe | | |
| 2003 | Galatta Ganapathy | | |
| 2004 | Campus | | |
| 2006 | Vanjagan | | |
| 2006 | Mazhai | | |
| 2006 | Kokki | | |
| 2007 | Ippadikku En Kadhal | | |
| 2008 | Sadhu Miranda | Inspector general of police | |
| 2008 | Ragasiya Snehithane | | |
| 2008 | Pattaya Kelappu | | |
| 2008 | Thithikkum Ilamai | | |
| 2008 | Velvi | | |
| 2009 | Ore Manasu | | |
| 2009 | Kudiyarasu | | |
| 2009 | Vaidehi | | Last Movie |
