= Officer Arjun Singh IPS Batch 2000 =

2020 Hindi Film

- Directed by: Arshad Siddqui
- Written by: Arshad Siddqui
- Produced by: Laxmi Narayan Pandey
- Starring: Priyanshu Chatterjee; Raai Laxmi; Govind Namdev; Vijay Raaz
- Cinematography: B Laxman
- Edited by: Bibhuti Bhushan
- Music by: Liyaqat Ajmeri; Anand Raj Anand
- Release date: 18 October 2019
- Running time: 120 minutes
- Country: India
- Language: Hindi

Officer Arjun Singh IPS Batch 2000 is a 2019 Indian Hindi-language film, starring Priyanshu Chatterjee, Raai Laxmi, Govind Namdev, Vijay Raaz and Deepraj Rana. The film is directed by Arshad Siddiqui and produced by Laxmi Narain Pandey Guruji. The film is based on important social issues and the present situation of the politics and police force. In the film Priyanshu Chatterjee plays the role of a fearless police officer and how he fights to get justice for a family by fighting against the system. The film was released on 18 October 2019. The film grossed ₹4 lakh.

== Plot ==
Officer Arjun Singh IPS Batch 2000 follows the journey of a determined police officer investigating a brutal rape and murder case.

Arjun (Priyanshu Chatterjee), posted in Allahabad, takes charge of the investigation after Maya (Rita Joshi), a resident of a women’s ashram, is raped by Agriculture Minister Balaknath Chaudhary (Govind Namdev) and subsequently goes missing. During the probe, Arjun befriends Durga (Raai Laxmi), a newcomer to the ashram run by Leela (Shabnam Kapoor).

Balaknath’s son, Kundan (Vijay Raaz), develops an obsession with Durga, kidnaps her, and attempts to forcefully marry her. Arjun intervenes just in time, arresting Kundan despite Hawaldar Shekhar Verma (Shoorveer Tyagi) tipping him off. After being released on bail, Kundan assaults Shekhar, who then confesses to Arjun that Maya was murdered by Kundan after she dared to report the rape.

Arjun arrests Kundan for murder, enraging Balaknath, who conspires to have Arjun killed inside the jail. Arjun narrowly survives the assassination attempt. Meanwhile, Durga conducts a sting operation that exposes Balaknath’s crimes.

The story builds toward the fallout of these revelations and the battle for justice that follows.

== Cast ==
- Priyanshu Chatterjee as Inspector Arjun Pratap Singh, IPS
- Raai Laxmi as Durga Dayal Singh
- Govind Namdev as Agriculture Minister Balaknath Chaudhari
- Vijay Raaz as Kundan
- Deepraj Rana as Inspector Pawan

== Reception ==
Pooja Raisinghani of The Times of India gave the movie 1.5/5 stars and wrote "Despite a rather impactful storyline, the performances fall flat due to the weak dialogues and dated special effects. Even strong antagonists like Vijay Raaz and Govind Namdeo could not save the scenes, mainly because of their faulty characterisation".

== Soundtrack ==
No.	Title	Singer(s)	Length
1.	"Haye Re Jawani"	Sonu Kakkar
2.	"Dhatt Tere Ki"	Tochi Raina
3.	"O Re Piya"	Ali Aslam
4.	"Insaaf Ke Maron"	Anand Raj Anand
