= Prathi Gnayiru 9 Manimudhal 10.30 Varai =

- Directed by: M. Anbu
- Produced by: Salai Maitri
- Starring: Suresh S. Poornitha
- Cinematography: Salai Sahadevan
- Edited by: Kumar
- Music by: John Peter
- Production company: Vision 21
- Release date: 17 November 2006
- Running time: 135 minutes
- Country: India
- Language: Tamil

Prathi Gnayiru 9 Manimudhal 10.30 Varai (transl. Every Sunday from 9:00 to 10:30) is a 2006 Indian Tamil-language drama film directed by M. Anbu and starring Suresh S. and Poornitha.

== Plot ==
Four carefree college students, Ramesh, Remo, Murugan and Seetharaman, on holiday, mistake Kalyani for a call girl and rape her. Realising their mistake, they hurriedly return to Chennai.

Ramesh is married off to a distant relative by his father. Only to discover, after the wedding, that his wife resembles Kalyani. This sends a chill down the spines of Ramesh's friends. A sequence of events lead to Kalyani taking revenge on the friends. Whether they realized their mistake and whether they are taken to task forms the rest of the storyline. In the end Kalyani fatally poisons Ramesh with chili smoke.

== Cast ==
- Suresh S. as Ramesh
- Poornitha as Kalyani
- Karunas as Remo
- 'Super 10' Balaji
- Ravi
- Rekhasri
- Vaiyapuri as Police officer
- Vasu Vikram as Policeman
- Delhi Ganesh as Ramesh's father
- Vennira Aadai Moorthy
- Kuyili as Kalyani's mother
- Bayilvan Ranganathan
- Bava Lakshmanan
- Singamuthu

== Production ==
Kalyani Suresh or Poornitha, then aged 15, agreed to do the film because she liked the character.

== Soundtrack ==
The music is composed by John Peter.

Track listing
No.	Title	Singer(s)	Length
1.	"Dhumkara Kara"	Karunas	4:04
2.	"Kakinada"	Premgi Amaren, Sam P. Keerthan	3:48
3.	"Maarappu"	Ranjith, Priya	3:24
4.	"Nallathore"	Udit Narayan	2:38
5.	"Ottrai Roja"	Harish Raghavendra	4:40
6.	"Soodu Paraka"	Manikka Vinayagam	4:28
Total length:			23:02

== Reception ==
Malini Mannath of Chennai Online opined that "The film opens with the shot of a woman cutting a solitary figure on a hillock near the waters, as she looks out into the beyond. The film ends there too. A very aesthetically taken shot. Wish the rest of the film's sensibility matched with it!".
