= Prema Pipasi =

2020 Telugu romantic comedy film

- Film poster
- Directed by: Murali Ramaswamy
- Written by: Murali Ramaswamy
- Produced by: PS Rama Krishna
- Starring: GPS; Kapilakshi Malhotra; Sonakshi Varma; Suman; Adnan Javid Khan
- Cinematography: Thirumala Rodriguez
- Edited by: SJ Shiva Kiran
- Music by: R's
- Release date: 13 March 2020
- Country: India
- Language: Telugu

Prema Pipasi is a 2020 Telugu-language romantic comedy film produced by PS Ramakrishna under SS Art Productions. The film was directed by Murali Ramaswamy and stars GPS, Suman, Kapilakshi Malhotra and Adnan Javid Khan

== Cast ==
- GPS as Bawa
- Kapilakshi Malhotra as Bala
- Suman
- Sonakshi
- Funbucket Bharga
- Adnan Javid Khan as Adil
