= Yutha Satham =

2022 Indian film by Ezhil

- Theatrical release poster
- Directed by: S. Ezhil
- Screenplay by: S. Ezhil
- Based on: Yutha Satham by Rajesh Kumar
- Produced by: D. Vijaykumaran
- Starring: Gautham Ram Karthik; R. Parthiban; Saipriya Deva
- Cinematography: R. B. Gurudev
- Edited by: Gopi Krishna
- Music by: D. Imman
- Production company: Kallal Global Entertainment
- Release date: 18 March 2022
- Running time: 125 minutes
- Country: India
- Language: Tamil

Yutha Satham (transl. The Sound of War) is a 2022 Indian Tamil-language action thriller film directed by S. Ezhil and produced by Kallal Global Entertainment. The film stars R. Parthiban, Gautham Ram Karthik and Saipriya Deva, with a supporting cast including Robo Shankar, Manobala, Vaiyapuri and Chaams. It is based on the novel of the same name by Rajesh Kumar. The film's music and score is composed by D. Imman, with cinematography handled by R. B. Gurudev and editing done by Gopi Krishna. The film was released on 18 March 2022 to negative reviews.

== Plot ==
A young girl (Saipriya) is found murdered right outside the police station. This leaves no option but challenges the potential of inspector Kathiravan (Parthiban) to bring the murderer before the law. The girl’s boyfriend Nakulan (Gautham Karthik), a private detective is thrown into a state of huge shock on seeing the dead boy of his girlfriend at the same time and place. Infuriated over the gruesome death, Nakulan decides to set out and find the culprits and seek revenge.

== Cast ==
- R. Parthiban as Kathirvelan, Inspector of police
- Gautham Ram Karthik as Nagulan, MSE Psychologist and Shadow Squad Detective, Raghavi's love interest
- Saipriya Deva as Raghavi, Nagulan's love interest
- Robo Shankar as Police Constable Selvam
- Manobala as Nagulan's boss
- Vaiyapuri as Ambi
- Chaams as Jack
- Ashvin Raja as Ashvin
- Moorthy
- Mithun Maheshwaran
- Muthaiah Kannadasan
- Kamaraj
- Madhu Sree as Vedhika
- Mathew Varghese as Police Commissioner Muthukrishnan
- Uday Mahesh as rival company chairman

== Production ==
In November 2020, R. Parthiban and Gautham Karthik were cast to play the lead roles in the film directed by Ezhil. The film is adapted from the crime novel of the same name written by Rajesh Kumar.

== Music ==
Yutha Satham

Soundtrack album by D. Imman
- Released: 1 March 2022
- Recorded: 2022
- Genre: Feature film soundtrack
- Language: Tamil
- Label: Aditya Music
- Producer: D. Imman

D. Imman chronology
Etharkkum Thunindhavan (2021)	Yutha Satham (2022)	My Dear Bootham (2022)

Singles from Yutha Satham
- 1. "Thailaanguyil" Released: 11 March 2022; 2. "Rock N Roll Rasaathi" Released: 16 March 2022

D. Imman composed the soundtrack and background score of the film while collaborating with Gautham Karthik for the second time after Yennamo Yedho and Ezhil for the fifth time after Manam Kothi Paravai, Desingu Raja, Vellaikaara Durai and Saravanan Irukka Bayamaen.The audio rights were sold to Aditya Music.The first single track "Thailaanguyil" was released on 11 March 2022.Another single track "Rock N Roll Rasaathi" was sung by Benny Dayal and Joewin Shamalina and released on 16 March 2022.The full album jukebox was released on 19 March 2022 after the film's release.The original soundtrack score was released on 8 April 2022.

Track listing
No.	Title	Lyrics	Singer(s)	Length
1.	"Thailaanguyil"	Yugabharathi	Sid Sriram	4:09
2.	"Rock N Roll Rasaathi"	Yugabharathi	Benny Dayal, Joewin Shamalina	4:21
3.	"Thimo Thimo Thima"	Yugabharathi	Narayanan Ravishankar, Jithinraj	3:03
Total length:				11:33

Yutha Satham

Film score by D. Imman
- Released: 8 April 2022
- Recorded: 2022
- Studio: D. Imman Sound Factory, Chennai
- Genre: Film score
- Language: Tamil
- Label: Aditya Music
- Producer: D. Imman
External audio
- Film Score on YouTube

Background score
No.	Title	Singer (s)	Length
1.	"A Reason to Live" (Instrumental)	-	1:18
2.	"Catch The Suspect" (Instrumental)	-	1:42
3.	"Cop In Action" (Instrumental)	-	1:33
4.	"Detective" (Instrumental)	-	1:00
5.	"Encounter" (Instrumental)	-	2:19
6.	"In The Pub" (Instrumental)	-	1:50
7.	"Investigation" (Instrumental)	-	0:55
8.	"Lady Love" (Instrumental)	-	1:01
9.	"Victim" (Instrumental)	-	1:34
10.	"Binaural Sound"	Maria Roe Vincent	2:42

== Release ==
The film was scheduled to be released in theatres on 26 January 2022, but got postponed to 18 March 2022.

== Reception ==
M. Suganth of The Times of India who gave 1.5 out of 5 stars after reviewing the film stated that "By the time we get to the final revelation on the identity of the killer, we hardly care." Avinash Ramachandran of Cinema Express gave 1.5 out of 5 stars stating that But the biggest mystery is how a film like this lacking in entertainment was made by Ezhil. It makes one ask... Whodunit, actually!." Maalai Malar noted that Ezhil has made the film less interesting with a thriller storyline, and the film lacks the sizzle and dynamism that a thriller film should have.
