= Saamida =

- Directed by: V. C. Vadivudaiyan
- Produced by: S. Poornapriya
- Starring: Pondy Ravi; Dhanushya
- Music by: Indhrajith
- Release date: 5 December 2008
- Country: India
- Language: Tamil

Saamida is a 2008 Indian Tamil-language action film directed by V. C. Vadivudaiyan, starring Pondy Ravi and Dhanushya. The film is scored by Indhrajith and was released on 6 December 2008.

== Plot ==
The film begins with a girl from Ramanathapuram who has been sold into prostitution. The unnamed girl is suffering from hunger and finds it difficult to make ends meet. A former regular client becomes her husband - a man who was shaped by awful experiences into a feared gang leader. The terrible things that the girl witnesses at the hands of her husband drives her to become a female gang leader, with the help of a loyal orphan.

Everyone was afraid when they went to see Kasi. They were involved in illegal alcohol, drugs and killing any enemies who are against them by Saami. In the meantime, Saami fell in love with the heroine Pelo and began doing illegal things without her lover. When she discovers this, she tried to change his mind.

== Cast ==
- Pondy Ravi as Saami (credited as Sembi)
- Dhanushya
- Amsadevi as Maaji

== Production ==
The film was earlier planned by Vadivudayan in 2005 with Murali as Arakkan. The film was entirely shot at Kasi. Pondy Ravi who earlier played supporting and negative roles made his debut as lead actor with this film.

== Music ==
The film music was composed by debutant Indrajith ET.

- "Rakshasa Raja" - Ananth, Ganga
- "Onrai Ondru" - Prasanna, Ganga, Sam P. Keerthan
- "Kadhal Desathile" - Ananth, Sam P. Keerthan
- "Hey Machina" - Vinaya Sathyan
- "Aayudham Yendha" - Ananth
- "Aanavam Azhinthadi" - Adarsh, Gopal Sharma, Vadivudayan VC

== Release ==
=== Critical reception ===
Sify wrote "Apart from some decent visuals, the film has nothing really new by way of story or screenplay".
