= Thambi Vettothi Sundaram =

- Film poster
- Directed by: V. C. Vadivudaiyan
- Written by: Pa. Raghavan (Dialogue)
- Screenplay by: V. C. Vadivudaiyan
- Story by: V. C. Vadivudaiyan
- Produced by: J. Senthilkumar (Presenter); R. Jaya Mutharaiyar; S. Sumithra Senthilkumar
- Starring: Karan; Anjali
- Cinematography: Anji
- Edited by: Suresh Urs
- Music by: Vidyasagar
- Production company: JS 24 Framers
- Release date: 11 November 2011
- Country: India
- Language: Tamil

Thambi Vettothi Sundaram is a 2011 Indian Tamil-language crime drama film written and directed by V. C. Vadivudaiyan. The film stars Karan and Anjali. It was released on 11 November 2011.

== Plot ==
In Kaliyakkavilai, Kanyakumari district, almost everyone is educated, and quite peculiarly, almost every second person is involved in some kind of illegal business, ranging from smuggling to the brewing of illegal liquor and other such activities. This place is certainly an antithesis for all those who believe that education is the one solution to all social evils. Here, people seem to be corrupt in spite of education. Sundaram is one from the town, well-educated, but not yet initiated into any subversive acts.

He has no idea to drift off onto the wrong side of the law, but the place and people are such that he finds it near impossible to follow a straightforward means of livelihood. He is confused, vexed, angry, and then finds Aala, who seems to understand his troubles; they form a jolly good duo. Who is Aala and what does the duo end up doing? Do they cleanse society, join the fray, or make enemies? In the midst of this, there is a love story as Lourd Mary falls for Sundaram, not without good reason.

Finally, in a fight with Chiluvai, the don of smuggling, Chiluvai burns Sundaram's eyes with a mix of acid and chalk powder and also breaks a part of his spinal cord. Even though Sundaram kills all, he loses his eyesight and cannot stand erect for more than 15 minutes, so he commits suicide by lying under a moving bullock cart. Two years later, Mary gets Sundaram's appointment letter as a teacher and cries.

== Cast ==
- Karan as Vettothi Sundaram
- Anjali as Lourd Mary
- Saravanan as Aala
- Ganja Karuppu as Current
- J. Senthilkumar as Chiluvai
- Kadhal Dhandapani as Mani (Chiluvai's godfather)
- Shanmugarajan as Udumbu (Chiluvai's right-hand)
- Balasingh as Pakku Paramasivam
- Saravana Subbiah as Sundaram's friend
- Vennira Aadai Moorthy as Tea Shop Owner

== Production ==
The film is about the lives of three people in Kanyakumari district. It is inspired from true life and events and the director even took the consent of the real life people before getting on board with the script.

== Soundtrack ==
The soundtrack was composed by Vidyasagar, and lyrics were written by Vairamuthu.

Song	Singer	Length
"Kolaikara Analaachu"	Kalyani Nair, Karthik	4:20
"Karuvarai Karuvarai Thodangumidam"	Palakkad Sreeram	4:21
"Ae Karuppa Par Eanda"	Velmurugan, Saravanan, Suchitra	4:54
"Netru Illai Illai"	Madhu Balakrishnan, Binni Krishnakumar	4:04

== Critical reception ==
Sify criticised the film's lack of newness and concluded, "On the whole Thambi Vettothi Sundaram is an overdose of emotions, dreary and slow moving". Malathi Rangarajan of The Hindu wrote, "Real or fictitious, the story of Sundaram isn't relevant only to the areas showcased — that frustration can lead a jobless youth astray is a universal possibility. Nor is the love story different from what we've seen or heard over the years. So there's nothing new in the life of Sundaram, for it to be showcased as distinct".
