= Raai Laxmi =

Indian actress, model

Lakshmi Rai
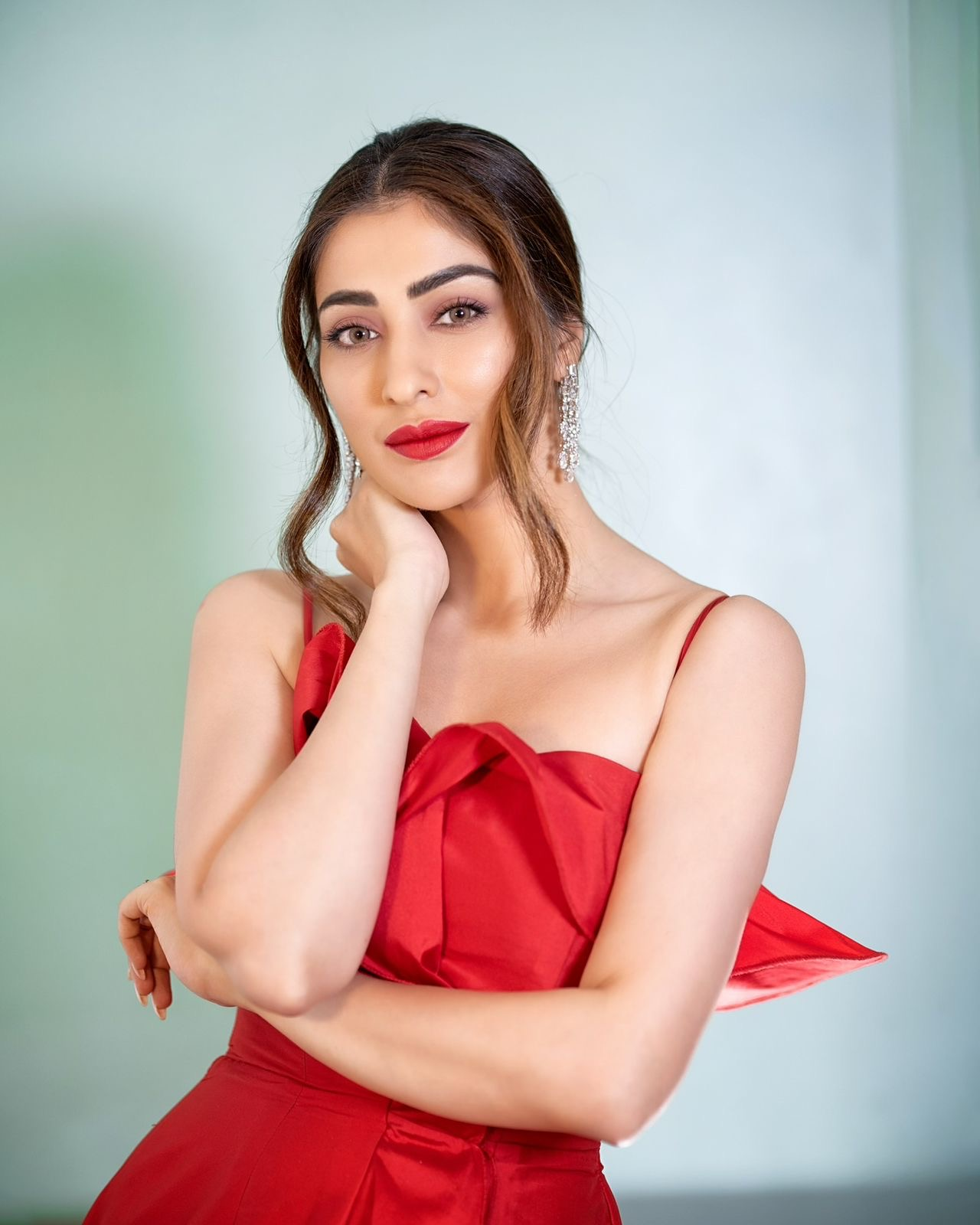
- Lakshmi in 2025
- Born: Lakshmi Rai; Bangalore, Karnataka, India
- Occupations: Actress; model
- Years active: 2005–present

Lakshmi Rai, professionally credited as Raai Laxmi, is an Indian actress and model who predominantly works in Tamil, Malayalam, Telugu, Kannada and Hindi languages.

== Early life ==
Raai Laxmi was born in Bangalore, Karnataka to Ram Rai and Manjula Rai. Her family relocated to Belgaum.

== Acting career ==
=== Early career (2005–2010) ===
In 2005, Laxmi made her film debut in the Tamil-language film Karka Kasadara. Subsequently, she appeared in a number of Tamil films, including the comedy film Kundakka Mandakka (2005) opposite R. Parthiban, Perarasu's action-masala flick Dharmapuri (2006) and the romance film Nenjai Thodu (2007). Valmiki (2005), opposite Shiva Rajkumar, marked her maiden film in Kannada.

In 2008, she began working in more serious films such as the drama film Velli Thirai, in which she played herself, and the action thriller Dhaam Dhoom, directed by Jeeva. She received positive feedback for her portrayal of a lawyer in the latter. A review from Behindwoods wrote: "The latter (Raai Laxmi) sizzles even as she is supposed to play the court professional who is caught in the web of smuggling drugs". She won her first Filmfare Award nomination in the Best Supporting Actress category.

She made her debut in Malayalam in 2007, starring in Rock n' Roll, opposite Mohanlal. She followed it up with several successful films such as Annan Thampi (2008), 2 Harihar Nagar (2009), Evidam Swargamanu (2009) opposite Mohanlal, and Chattambinadu (2009) opposite Mammootty. She appeared in three Tamil films in 2009, Muthirai, Vaamanan and Naan Avanillai 2.

In Vaamanan (2009), she played a glamorous supermodel. In 2010, she was seen in three films. She made special appearances during song sequences in two of them, In Ghost House Inn and Pen Singam and portrayed a cowgirl in the Tamil film Irumbukkottai Murattu Singam.

=== Public recognition and success (2011–2014) ===
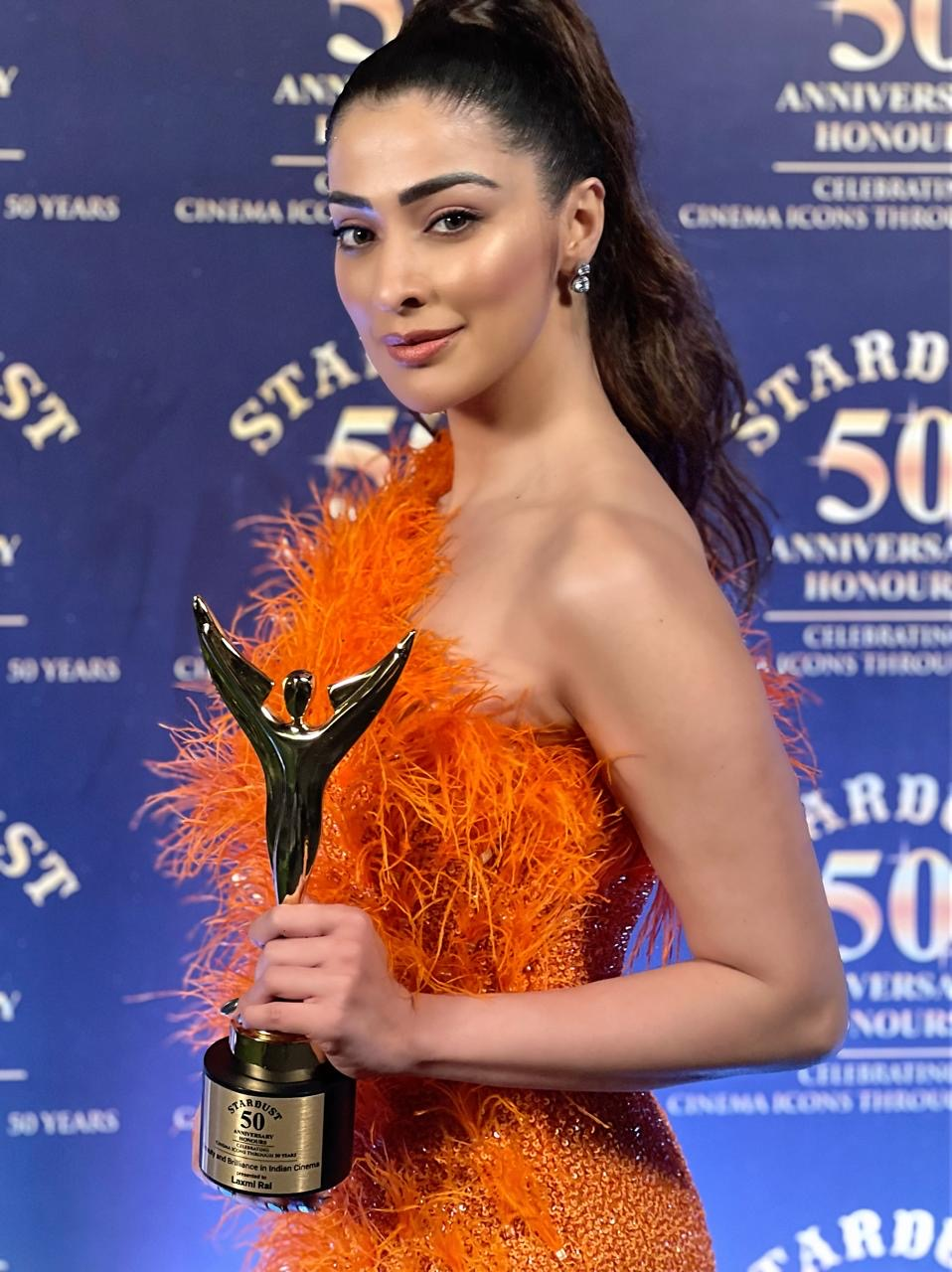
Laxmi at the Stardust 50th Anniversary Honours, receiving her award for excellence in Indian cinema

Laxmi's first 2011 release was Christian Brothers. Her next two films were Tamil projects, the comedy horror Kanchana and the Venkat Prabhu-directed action thriller Mankatha, starring Ajith Kumar. She played a negative character in the latter, which was received positively by critics. Following Kanchana's success, she was signed on to reprise the role in its Kannada remake, Kalpana (2012). Her 2014 films were Irumbu Kuthirai, Aranmanai in Tamil and RajadhiRaja in Malayalam.

=== Recent work (2016–present) ===
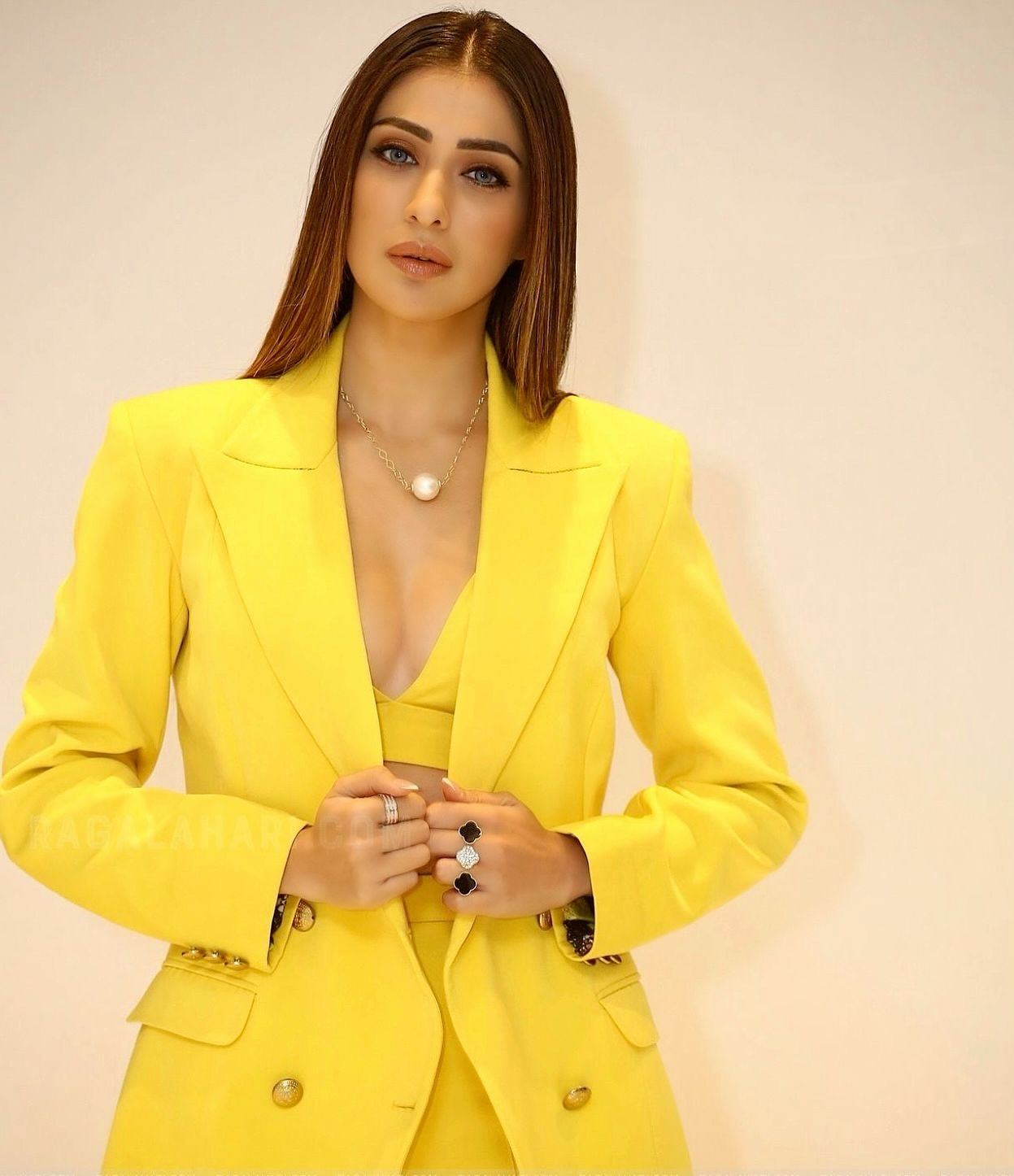
Laxmi during an editorial photoshoot

In 2016, she signed two Tamil films, Bangalore Naatkal and Sowkarpettai. After a brief gap, she performed her second item number opposite Pawan Kalyan in his Telugu film Sardaar Gabbar Singh (2016). She debuted in Hindi with the movie Akira directed by AR Murugadoss.

She signed to perform her fourth item number with Chiranjeevi in his 150th film Khaidi No. 150 (2017), and later in Motta Shiva Ketta Shiva (2017) in Tamil with Raghava Lawrence. Raai Laxmi portrayed the lead role in her second Hindi film Julie 2 (2017).

In 2018, she made her comeback to Malayalam cinema with the Mammootty starrer Oru Kuttanadan Blog.

In 2019, she starred in horror movies Where Is the Venkatalakshmi in Telugu and Neeya 2 in Tamil; both were box office failures. She also starred in the Bollywood film, Officer Arjun Singh IPS Batch 2000.

In 2021, she starred in the Tamil horror movie Cinderella.

== Filmography ==
=== Film ===
Key
†	Denotes films that have not yet been released

- Note: She was credited as Lakshmi Rai until 2014.

List of Raai Laxmi film credits
Year	Title	Role(s)	Language	Notes	Ref.
2005	Karka Kasadara	Anjali	Tamil	Tamil debut	
2005	Kanchanamala Cable TV	Sireesha / Kanchanamala	Telugu	Telugu debut	
2005	Kundakka Mandakka	Roopa	Tamil		
2005	Valmiki	Lakshmi Deshpande	Kannada	Kannada debut	
2006	Neeku Naaku	Saranya	Telugu		
2006	Dharmapuri	Valarmathy	Tamil		
2007	Nenjai Thodu	Aishwarya	Tamil		
2007	Rock n' Roll	Daya Sreenivas	Malayalam	Malayalam debut	
2007	Snehana Preethina	Lakshmi	Kannada		
2008	Velli Thirai	Herself	Tamil	Cameo	
2008	Annan Thampi	Thenmozhi	Malayalam		
2008	Minchina Ota	Lakshmi	Kannada		
2008	Parunthu	Rakhi	Malayalam		
2008	Ragasiya Snehithane	Jennifer	Tamil		
2008	Dhaam Dhoom	Aarthi Chinappa	Tamil		
2009	2 Harihar Nagar	Maya / Christina Honai / Serina	Malayalam		
2009	Muthirai	Kavyanjali "Kavya"	Tamil		
2009	Vaamanan	Pooja	Tamil		
2009	Naan Avanillai 2	Deepa	Tamil		
2009	Oru Kadhalan Oru Kadhali	Charanya	Tamil		
2009	Chattambinadu	Gouri	Malayalam		
2009	Ividam Swargamanu	Adv. Sunitha	Malayalam		
2010	In Ghost House Inn	Serina	Malayalam	Special appearance in the song "Ole Ole"	
2010	Irumbukkottai Murattu Singam	Pakki	Tamil		
2010	Pen Singam	Herself	Tamil	Special appearance in the song "Adi Aadi Asaiyum Edupu"	
2011	Christian Brothers	Sofia	Malayalam		
2011	Kanchana	Priya	Tamil		
2011	Mankatha	Sona	Tamil		
2011	Oru Marubhoomikkadha	Meenakshy Thampuran, Manasi Thampuran	Malayalam	Double role	
2012	Casanovva	Hana	Malayalam		
2012	Mayamohini	Maya / Katrina	Malayalam		
2012	Adhinayakudu	Deepthi	Telugu		
2012	Kalpana	Priya	Kannada		
2012	Thaandavam	Geetha	Tamil		
2013	Attahasa	Vijetha Vasisht	Kannada	Guest appearance	
2013	Onbadhule Guru	Sanjana	Tamil		
2013	Aaru Sundarimaarude Katha	Fouzia Hassan IPS	Malayalam		
2013	Balupu	Herself	Telugu	Special appearance in the song "Lucky Lucky Rai"	
2014	Irumbu Kuthirai	Christina	Tamil		
2014	RajadhiRaja	Radha	Malayalam		
2014	Aranmanai	Maya	Tamil		
2016	Bangalore Naatkal	Lakshmi	Tamil		
2016	Sowkarpettai	Maya	Tamil		
2016	Sardaar Gabbar Singh	Herself	Telugu	Special appearance in the song "Tauba Tauba"	
2016	Akira	Maya Amin	Hindi	Hindi debut	
2017	Khaidi No. 150	Herself	Telugu	Special appearance in the song "Ratthaalu"	
2017	Motta Shiva Ketta Shiva	Herself	Tamil	Special appearance in the song "Hara Hara Mahadevaki"	
2017	Julie 2	Julie / Sumitra Devi	Hindi		
2018	Oru Kuttanadan Blog	Sreejaya	Malayalam		
2019	Where Is the Venkatalakshmi	Venkatalakshmi	Telugu		
2019	Neeya 2	Malar / Nagarani	Tamil		
2019	Officer Arjun Singh IPS Batch 2000	Durga Dayal Singh	Hindi		
2021	Mirugaa	Lakshmi	Tamil		
2021	Jhansi I.P.S	Jhansi I.P.S	Kannada		
2021	Cinderella	Thulasi / Akira	Tamil	Dual role	
2022	The Legend	Herself	Tamil	Special appearance in the song "Vaadi Vaasal"	
2023	Bholaa	Herself	Hindi	Special appearance in the song "Paan Dukaniya"	
2024	DNA	Rachel Punnoose IPS	Malayalam		
2025	Janata Bar	Lucky Rai	Telugu		
TBA	Wolf †	TBA	Tamil		

=== Television ===
List of Raai Laxmi television credits
Year	Title	Role	Language	Channel	Notes
2009	Anu Alavum Baiyamillai 2	Host	Tamil	Vijay TV	Reality show
2015	Star Challenge	Contestant	Malayalam	Flowers TV	Reality show
2020	Poison 2	Sara	Hindi	ZEE5	Web series
2020	Bigg Boss (Telugu season 4)	Guest	Telugu	Star Maa	Reality show
2021	Comedy Stars Season 3	Celebrity Judge	Malayalam	Asianet	Reality show

== Awards and nominations ==
List of Raai Laxmi awards and nominations
Year	Award	Category	Film	Result	Ref.
2009	Asianet Film Awards	Most Popular Actress	Evidam Swargamanu	Won	
2009	Filmfare Awards South	Best Supporting Actress – Malayalam	Evidam Swargamanu	Nominated	
2011	Filmfare Awards South	Best Supporting Actress – Tamil	Mankatha	Nominated	
2012	South Indian International Movie Awards	Stylish Star of South Indian Cinema	Various films	Won	
