= V. C. Vadivudaiyan =

Indian film director and screenwriter

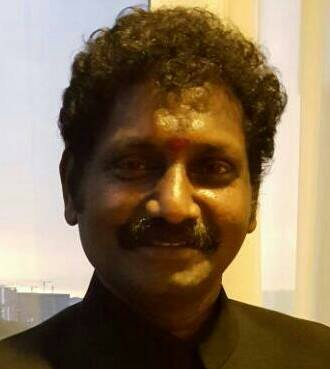
- Born: 28 May 1977 (age 49)
- Occupation: Director
- Years active: 2008–present

V. C. Vadivudaiyan is an Indian film director and screenwriter. He has worked on Tamil films.

== Career ==
In 2000, Vadivudaiyan planned to make Puththan, starring Arunkumar and Divya Unni. The film was shelved before production ended. Vadivudaiyan eventually made his directorial debut with the film Saamida (2008), after working as an assistant to director Shaji Kailas. The film was entirely shot at Kasi. It had a mediocre box office run and critical reception. His next venture was drama film Thambi Vettothi Sundaram (2011) starring Karan and Anjali. During the making of the film, local people protested against the use of the title and attacked the director on set. The film received mixed reviews with a critic at Behindwoods.com noting the film "could have been much better, only if it had been packaged a bit more cleverly".

In 2012, Vadivudaiyan opened production studio Singam Cinema and announced that he would make a trilingual film titled Chokkanathan. He suggested that Karan would star in the Tamil version, while Saif Ali Khan, Kareena Kapoor and Vidya Balan would feature in the Hindi version. The film failed to materialise. He then made Kanniyum Kaalaiyum Sema Kadhal starring Karan, Tarun Gopi and Tripta Parashar, but the film failed to have a theatrical release.

Unable to release his earlier film, Vadivudaiyan signed up Srikanth and Raai Laxmi to star in a horror film titled Sowkarpettai (2016). He worked on a further horror film, Pottu (2019), starring Bharath, Iniya and Namitha.

In late 2017, Vadivudaiyan began work on Veeramadevi, a period drama featuring Sunny Leone in the lead role. The shoot of the film was completed throughout schedules conducted in 2018, and by early 2019, the director announced a further political drama film with Sunny Leone titled Delhi. While the latter did not develop into production, Veeramadevi became stalled and did not have a theatrical release. In early 2020, Vadivudaiyan announced a project titled Pambattam featuring Jeevan and Mallika Sherawat in the lead roles. Production on the film progressed slowly over the course of several years, though it had a low-key release in 2024. In mid-2022, Vadivudaiyan revealed that he was working on a project titled Naga Bhairava with Zareen Khan in dual lead roles.

== Filmography ==
Year	Film	Notes
2008	Saamida	
2011	Thambi Vettothi Sundaram	
2016	Sowkarpettai	
2019	Pottu	
2024	Pambattam	Also actor
