= Sowkarpettai =

2016 Indian film by V. C. Vadivudaiyan

- Theatrical release poster
- Directed by: V. C. Vadivudaiyan
- Written by: V. C. Vadivudaiyan, Durai P. G. (dialogues)
- Produced by: John Max; Jones; Haresh Vikram Vijayakumar
- Starring: Srikanth; Raai Laxmi
- Cinematography: S. Sreenivasa Reddy
- Edited by: Elisa
- Music by: John Peter
- Production company: Shalom Studios
- Distributed by: Sri Thenandal Films
- Release date: 4 March 2016
- Running time: 132 Minutes
- Country: India
- Language: Tamil

Sowkarpettai is a 2016 Indian Tamil-language comedy horror film directed by V. C. Vadivudaiyan starring Srikanth in a dual role as hero and villain, alongside Lakshmi Rai with music composed by John Peter. The film was initially scheduled for release on 26 February 2016 but ultimately released on 4 March 2016.

== Plot ==
When a couple is murdered by a cruel businessman, their ghosts begin to haunt the killers for revenge.

== Cast ==
- Srikanth in a dual role as
  - Shakthi
  - Vetri
- Raai Laxmi as Maya
- Suman as Gothra Singh
- Saravanan as Senior
- Powerstar Srinivasan as Junior
- Singampuli as Puli
- Ganja Karuppu as Saami
- Manobala as Mani
- Thalaivasal Vijay as Paramasivam (Vetri and Shakthi's father)
- Rekha as Parvathi (Vetri and Shakthi's mother)
- Vadivukkarasi as Demonness
- Meenakshi as Sanya
- Aarthi
- T. P. Gajendran
- Subbaraj
- Vengal Rao
- Madhan G
- Hresh
- Lingesh
- Rahul
- Priyanka

== Production ==
The film was first reported in March 2015, when Vadivudaiyaan announced that he would make a film starring Srikanth and Lakshmi Rai, set in the backdrop of Sowcarpet.

== Music ==
Soundtrack was composed by John Peter and lyrics written by Viveka, (late)Na. Muthukumar and Sorkho.

- "Indha Nodi" — Ranjith, Ranina Reddy
- "Bhayam" — Marana Gana Viji
- "Ayyo Vallikudhe" — Haricharan
- "Modhi Parpene" — Ram, Saritha Ram

== Reception ==
Vishal Menon of The Hindu called it "yet another horror-sleaze-comedy, Kollywood's latest fad, following the Aranmanai series" and also stated "it's the kind of film where even ghosts (Raai Laxmi mostly) aren't spared from being objectified". M. Suganth of The Times of India gave it a 1.5/5 and wrote "For a horror film, Sowcarpettai is hardly scary. It is one of those cheaply produced, paint-by-numbers horror films that hopes to cash in on a trend, relying on tacky visual effects, an overloud score, and costumes and makeup that make the characters seem like poorly dressed guests at a Halloween party."
