= Suman (actor) =

Indian film actor

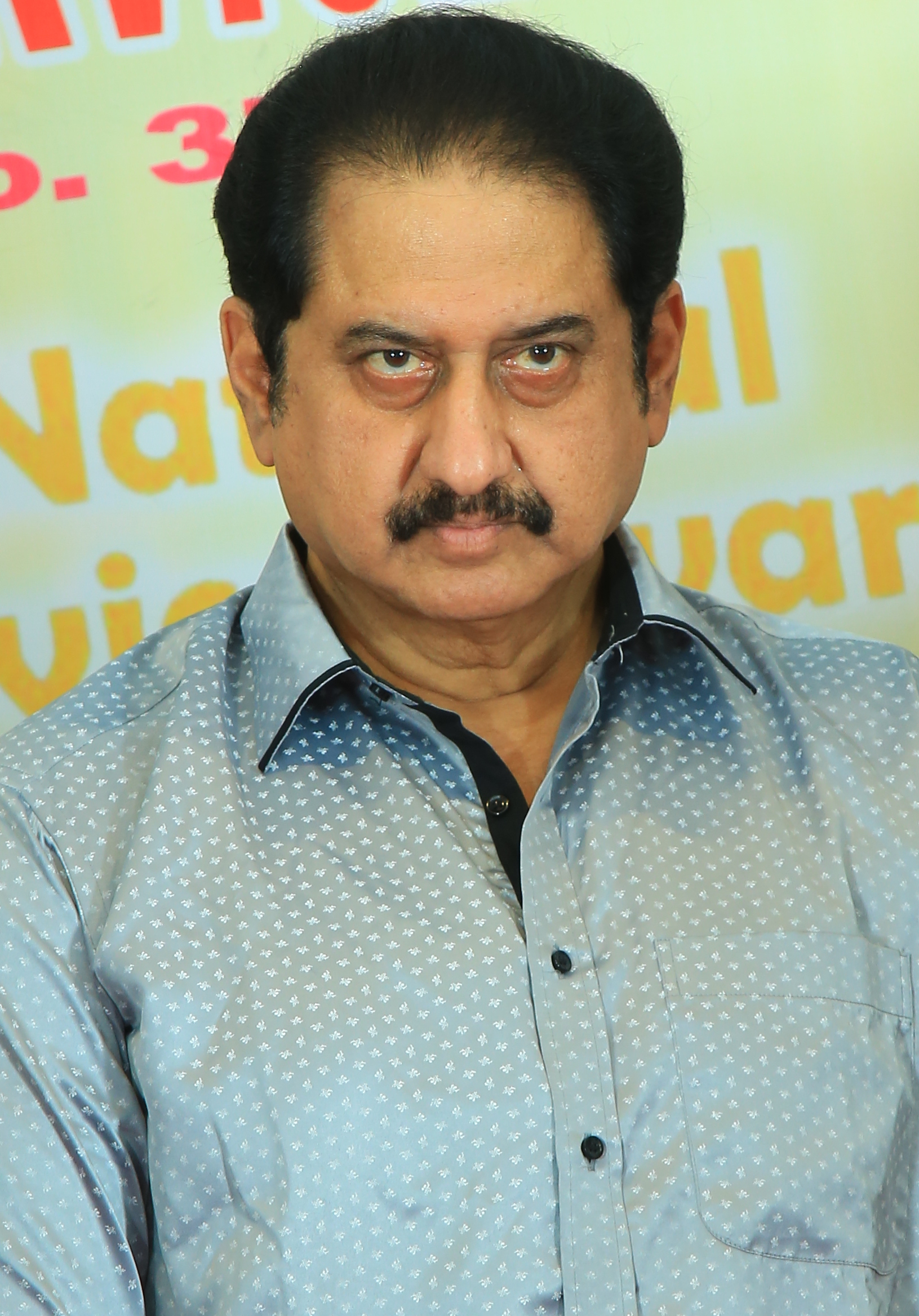
- Born: 28 August 1959 (age 67); Madras, Madras State (now Chennai, Tamil Nadu), India
- Occupation: Actor
- Years active: 1977–present
- Works: Full list
- Spouse: Sirisha
- Children: 1

Suman is an Indian actor known for his work in South Indian films. He played the male lead and supporting characters mostly in Telugu and Tamil films. He also featured in a few Kannada, Malayalam and Hindi projects. In a career spanning almost 5 decades, he has acted in more than 700 films in 10 languages. He was one of the most prominent actors of Telugu cinema during the 1980s and 1990s.

== Early life ==
Suman was born in a Tulu-speaking Billava family in Madras of present-day Tamil Nadu. His mother, Kesari Chandra, was the Principal of the Ethiraj College for Women in Chennai. His father, Susheel Chandra, worked for I.O.C. Chennai. He attended Bharat Higher Secondary School , Cathedral road and

The Besant Theosophical High School, Chennai and completed a B.A. in English Literature. Suman learnt music and Sanskrit from H.A.S. Shastri.

== Career ==
He acted in many action and romantic movies in Telugu, including Tharangini (1982), Neti Bharatam (1983) and Sitaara (1984). Suman played many godly characters such as Venkateswara, Shiva, and Rama in Telugu feature films. He won Nandi Award for Best Actor for his role in the 1993 film Bava Bavamaridi.

He returned to acting by playing the villain in the Tamil films Sivaji (2007) and Kuruvi (2008). He played the main antagonist in the Malayalam movie Sagar alias Jacky (2009). He also won the Asianet Film Honour Special Jury Award in 2009.

He has also appeared in a Bollywood film, Gabbar Is Back (2015), starring as the antagonist pit against Akshay Kumar.

== Politics ==
Suman initially started showing his interest in politics by supporting Telugu Desam Party during 1999 under the leadership of the then Chief Minister N. Chandrababu Naidu. In 2004, he, along with his supporters, joined Bharatiya Janata Party.

== Personal life ==
Suman is married to Sirisha, and they have a daughter.
