= Pichaikkaran 2 =

2023 Indian action thriller film

- Theatrical release poster
- Directed by: Vijay Antony
- Written by: Vijay Antony; K Palani; Paul Antony
- Produced by: Fatima Vijay Antony
- Starring: Vijay Antony; Kavya Thapar
- Cinematography: Om Narayan
- Edited by: Vijay Antony
- Music by: Vijay Antony
- Production company: Vijay Antony Film Corporation
- Distributed by: Vijay Antony Film Corporation
- Release date: 19 May 2023
- Running time: 160 minutes
- Country: India
- Language: Tamil

Pichaikkaran 2 (transl. Beggar 2) also known as Pichaikkaran 2: Anti Bikili is a 2023 Indian Tamil-language science fiction action film written and directed by Vijay Antony in his directorial debut. The film stars Antony in a dual role, alongside an ensemble cast of Kavya Thapar, Radha Ravi, Yogi Babu, Hareesh Peradi, Dev Gill, John Vijay, Y. G. Mahendran and Mansoor Ali Khan. It is a standalone sequel to the 2016 film Pichaikkaran.

While directing and acting in the film, Vijay Antony also handled the editing and music composition for the film. The cinematography was handled by Om Narayan. Pichaikkaran 2 was released on 19 May 2023.

== Plot ==
Sathya is a beggar, who is searching for his long-lost sister Raani as she was sold by human traffickers under the guise of people running an orphanage. One day, Sathya is kidnapped by mercenaries, and the doctors transplant his brain into the body of Sathya's doppelganger Vijay Gurumoorthy, a renowned business tycoon. Sathya's brain is transplanted into Vijay's body. Later, Sathya regains consciousness and is shocked to see his new persona. After this, Vijay's business partners Aravind, Illango and Dr. Shiva, who are the main masterminds behind the transplant, meet Sathya and force him to act as Vijay.

Sathya reluctantly accepts and begins his new life as Vijay, where he meets Vijay's girlfriend Hema. One day, Sathya sneaks into the police station and tells a police officer about his real identity and the brain transplant done by Aravind, Illango and Shiva, but the officer doesn't believe him. Sathya is caught by Aravind, Illango and Shiva, where he is brought to an island and is brutally tortured by the trio. However, Sathya gets agitated, he kills and dumps Aravind, Illango and Shiva's bodies in the island and returns to Chennai. Due to an incident regarding a girl's death by a politician, Sathya decides to take Vijay's place and starts a non-profit foundation named Anti Bikili, which will help solve the poor people's problems and eradicate poverty in the state.

The Anti Bikili Foundation becomes a success, and Sathya receives admiration and respect from the public. One night, the police find Aravind, Illango and Shiva's corpses, while helping the survivors in a plane crash. The police officer learns about the trio and informs Sathya's earlier conversation in the police station to the CM, who blackmails Sathya in giving him a share of the money, but Sathya refuses and reveals his real identity to Hema. Sathya surrenders to the court. After a heavy court case, the court declares Vijay's properties to be transferred to Hema (who is pregnant with Vijay's child), thus saving the Anti Bikili foundation, while Sathya is sentenced to 10 years in prison for the murders. Sathya thanks Hema for her timely help and finally meets Raani, along with her married husband and her daughter, who is also named Sathya. Sathya apologies to Raani and promises to reunite with her after his release from prison.

== Cast ==
- Vijay Antony in a dual role as
  - Vijay Gurumoorthy
  - Sathya (Fake Vijay Gurumoorthy)
- Kavya Thapar as Hema
- Dev Gill as Aravind
- John Vijay as Ilango
- Hareesh Peradi as Dr. Shiva
- Yogi Babu as Maddy
- Radha Ravi as Chief Minister
- Mansoor Ali Khan as ACP Gopal
- Y. G. Mahendran as M. Krishna Iyer, Vijay Gurumoorthy's father's secretary
- Mohan Raman as Public Prosecutor Krishnaswamy
- Raja Krishnamoorthy as Dr. Mehta
- Sheela Rajkumar as Raani, Sathya's sister
- Sai Dheena as Police Inspector
- Madhesh
- Shivanya as Poongodi
- Chandrasekar Koneru as IG of Police
- Priyadarshini Rajkumar
- Fawaz Zayani as Avinash
- "Yaanai Joke" Kathir
- Shivangi Verma as a dancer (cameo appearance in "Nana Buluku" song)

== Production ==
=== Development ===
After the success of Pichaikkaran, its lead actor Vijay Antony planned to make a sequel in 2020 and had approached Sasi to direct the sequel, but he was busy with other commitments, due to which Antony searched for directors and chose Priya Krishnaswamy. The first look poster was released on 24 July 2020. The crew announced that the film will be dubbed in Telugu and titled Bichagadu 2. However, Priya opted out of the film crew. In 2021, while acting in Kodiyil Oruvan, Antony asked the director Ananda Krishnan to direct Pichaikkaran 2. Later, Vijay Antony himself wrote the script with co-writers K. Palani and Paul Antony, where he finally decided to make his directorial debut with this film. The film was produced by Fatima Vijay Antony under the banner of Vijay Antony Film Corporation. It is the tenth production of Vijay Antony Film Corporation. The character look poster for Pichaikkaran 2: Anti Bikili was released on 12 March 2022.

=== Filming ===
Principal photography began on 1 September 2021. The film was shot in Chennai, Malaysia, Kolkata, Georgia, and Dubai. On 13 December 2022, three of the film's technicians were arrested for taking a shot with a drone camera above the Madras High Court without permission from authorities. In mid-January 2023, while filming a final sequence of the song "Kaloorum Poove" in Langkawi, Antony and the lead actress Kavya Thapar were riding a jet ski when another boat collided with it, leaving Antony with a broken jaw and nose, while Thapar suffered major facial injuries. Both underwent treatment and recovered, and resumed filming in early February. The cinematography was done by Om Narayan, and the editing by Antony himself. The action sequences were choreographed by Rajasekar, who earlier worked on the Malayalam film Ayyappanum Koshiyum, and Mahesh Mathew, who earlier worked with Antony on Kodiyil Oruvan. A four-minute promotional sneak peek video of the film released on 10 February 2023. The trailer for the film was released on 29 April 2023.

== Music ==
Pichaikkaran 2

Soundtrack album by Vijay Antony
- Released: 2023
- Recorded: 2022–2023
- Genre: Feature film soundtrack
- Length: 20:48
- Label: Saregama
- Producer: Vijay Antony

Vijay Antony chronology
Iruvar Ullam (2021)	Pichaikkaran 2 (2023)	Mazhai Pidikkatha Manithan (2024)

The music of the film was composed by Vijay Antony.

Track listing
No.	Title	Lyrics	Singer(s)	Length
1.	"Bikili"	Vijay Antony	Vijay Antony	3:58
2.	"Koyil Silaye"	Arun Bharathi	Nivas	4:15
3.	"Anti Bikili Theme"	Vijay Antony	Shenbagaraj, Sarath Santosh, Saisharan, Narayanan, Vignesh Narayanan	2:28
4.	"Nana Buluku"	Arun Bharathi	Kharesma Ravichandran	4:19
5.	"Kalloorum Poove"	Arun Bharathi	Sarath Santhosh, Madhushree	3:57
6.	"Iraivan Uruvil"	Thamizhanangu	Vikram Pitty, Aravind Kameshwaran, Kaushik Sridharan, Vrusha, Pavitra Chari, Lakshmi, Surabhi	1:51
Total length:				20:48

== Release ==
=== Theatrical ===
The makers had earlier announced that the film would release along with dubbed versions of the film in Telugu, Malayalam, Kannada, and Hindi on 14 April 2023, but it was postponed due to a plagiarism allegation. The film later released on 18 May 2023.

The overseas distribution rights for the film in the United Kingdom were acquired by Ahimsa Entertainment, while the Malaysian and Sri Lankan distribution rights were secured by Lotus Five Star and MCC Group Pvt. Ltd. It was released in Europe by Friday Entertainment.

=== Plagiarism allegations ===
After the release of the sneak peek video of Pichaikkaran 2, V. Rajaganapthy, the producer of Aaivukkoodam, filed a petition in the Madras High Court against Vijay Antony Film Corporation, stating that the story of the film Pichaikkaran 2 was plagiarism from the story of Aaivukkoodam. Rajaganapthy also requested that the film not be released until the issue is solved. The court rejected Rajaganapathy's request stating that the brain transplant concept has already been used in many films; except for that concept, there were no similarities between the films.

=== Home media ===
The film began streaming on Disney+ Hotstar from 18 June 2023.

== Reception ==
Logesh Balachandran of The Times of India gave it 2.5 out of 5 stars and wrote, "Pichaikkaran 2 doesn't really beg for our attention and nearly manages to hold us for an average watch." Thinkal Menon of OTTplay gave it 3 out of 5 stars and wrote, "The film doesn't offer any innovative story or performances, but its packaging works to a decent extent which makes it a one-time watchable fare."

Janani K of India Today gave it 2 out of 5 stars and wrote, "Vijay Antony, who has donned the hat of a director, actor, writer and producer with Pichaikkaran 2, failed in his first attempt. The story is far-fetched, while the film is a shoddy affair." Kirubhakar Purushothaman of The Indian Express gave it 1 out of 5 stars and wrote, "For some time now even Ajith and Vijay have been steering clear of these one-man-saves-all films, and there was a respite from the nonsense. The break is over with Pichaikkaran 2."

Gopinath Rajendran of The Hindu wrote "With Pichaikkaran 2, Vijay Antony takes over directing duties too, but it's the acting part where he shines the most." Sowmya Rajendran of The News Minute gave it 1.5 out of 5 stars and wrote, "While Pichaikkaran 2, directed by Vijay Antony himself, has a lot of empty rhetoric on poverty, some crucial plot threads are left hanging."

Navein Darshan of Cinema Express gave it 1.5 out of 5 stars and wrote, "Apart from directing, producing and starring in Pichaikkaran 2, Vijay has also taken care of editing, screenplay, dialogues, story, and music composing in true T Rajendar style. However, the biggest TR element the film carries is the 'Thangachi sentiment'." He also criticized the term Bikili by adding, "Films that milk the emotions of the poor to make money!"

== Sequel ==
During the promotions of his 2025 film Maargan, Vijay Antony revealed that Pichaikkaran 3 would be released on 2027.
