= Thimiru Pudichavan =

2018 Indian Tamil-language action drama film directed by Ganeshaa

- Release Poster
- Directed by: Ganeshaa
- Written by: Ganeshaa
- Produced by: Fatima Vijay Antony
- Starring: Vijay Antony; Nivetha Pethuraj
- Cinematography: Richard M. Nathan
- Edited by: Vijay Antony
- Music by: Vijay Antony
- Production company: Vijay Antony Film Corporation
- Distributed by: Screen Scene
- Release date: 16 November 2018
- Running time: 176 minutes
- Country: India
- Language: Tamil

Thimiru Pudichavan (transl. Arrogant Man) is a 2018 Indian Tamil-language action drama film written and directed by Ganeshaa. It features Vijay Antony, Nivetha Pethuraj and Sai Dheena in the lead roles. The film is produced by Fatima Vijay Antony under the production banner Vijay Antony Film Corporation.

Production began between February and March 2018. The film was earlier scheduled to have its theatrical release on 6 November 2018, coinciding with Diwali while scheduled to have its theatrical release clashing alongside Sarkar, but was postponed to 16 November 2018. The first look poster of the film was released on 1 February 2018.

Thimiru Pudichavan received mixed reviews from critics who praised Vijay's performance, action sequences and cinematography, but criticized its screenwriting.

== Plot ==
Murugavel is a police constable in Virudhunagar, who lives his life for his brother Ravi, a school student. Murugavel finds that Ravi is having an antisocial nature following various incidents, where he tries various ways to change the mindset of his brother, but to no avail. One day, Ravi runs away from home to live a better life, while Murugavel gets posted as a SI in Chennai.

While in Chennai, Murugavel discovers that Ravi is involved in snatching as well as other cases, and that his brother is working for Meesa Padma, a local gangster who uses children under 18 years of age for his antisocial activities. Murugavel is identified as a sweet corn vendor by Ravi and Murugavel also shows interest to live with his brother. On the other hand, Ravi tries to kill Murugavel by adding poison to the food bought for him, but Murugavel refuses to eat for three consecutive days. On the place where he has set his sweet corn shop, Murugavel meets Madonna, a policewoman who comes to collect bribes from local shopkeepers.

At night, Ravi plans the next operation of snatching at a spot near Murugavel's shop, where he soon learns about Murugavel's identity as a police officer. Later, Murugavel chases Ravi through the streets and later kills him in a police encounter. After this, Murugavel is regarded as a daring officer and is promoted to Inspector, but fights the condition of getting high blood pressures and insomnia at times. Murugavel sets out on a mission to solve problems in the city and decides to take on Meesa Padma. Madonna and Murugavel fall in love with each other.

One day, Murugavel gets slit by two young boys working for Meesa Padma, but is then saved and admitted to the hospital by Madonna, who had foreseen a nightmare of Murugavel getting slit. With the people heading to see him, the young boys realize their mistake and side with Murugavel during the final climactic fight between Murugavel and Meesa Padma. Murugavel fights Meesa Padma and finally defeats him, but not before getting his vein slit by a needle hidden inside Padma's mouth. After this, Murugavel gets promoted as ACP, where he is finally at peace after he sees a hallucination of Ravi, who apologize for his mistakes. Murugavel finally overcomes his insomnia and his blood pressure remains stabilized at normal during his sleep.

== Cast ==
- Vijay Antony as CI Murugavel
- Nivetha Pethuraj as SI Madonna
- Sai Dheena as Padmanabhan alias Meesai Padma
- Lakshmy Ramakrishnan as a doctor
- Swaminathan as Madonna's father
- Prabhakaran as a lawyer
- TSR Srinivasan as a Judge
- Vazhakku En Muthuraman as police commissioner
- Jack Robin as Ravi, Murugavel's brother
- Nixen as a teenager
- Kicha as a teenager
- Sampath Ram as a police constable
- Balla as Meesai Padma's henchman

== Production ==
The production of the film commenced in around February 2018 by director Ganeshaa, who earlier made his debut directorial venture through Nambiyaar in 2016, whereas Vijay Antony was coincidentally chosen as the music director for that film.

The filmmakers initially planned the idea of releasing the film in Telugu language only but later revealed that the film would have its theatrical release in Tamil as well. The film title was announced by the director casting Vijay Antony in the male lead role while Vijay Antony was awaiting for his first film in the year 2018, Kaali. The shooting of the film was commenced in Chennai, and the post production works of the movie were completed in Thirunelveli around September 2018. It is a low budgeted feature film due to the box office failure of Kaali. The motion poster of the film was released on 18 July 2018.

This film also marked Vijay Antony's first film as a cop, and also handling music direction and film editor just what he did on his previous film Annadurai. Cinematography was handled by Richard M. Nathan, who previously handled the cinematography for Antony's previous film Kaali. It was also revealed that Vijay Antony had also learnt Silambam for the action sequences of the film. A.M. Rahmathulla was also hired for the sound department. The official theme song promo of the film was released as a 3D animation song on 6 October 2018. The official teaser of the film was released on 10 October 2018 and received positive reviews among the audience with containing a devotional song of Lord Muruga.

== Soundtrack ==
Thimiru Pudichavan

Soundtrack album by Vijay Antony
- Released: 15 October 2018
- Recorded: 2018
- Genre: Soundtrack
- Length: 20:21
- Language: Tamil
- Label: Divo
- Producer: Vijay Antony

Vijay Antony chronology
Kaali (2018)	Thimiru Pudichavan (2018)	Iruvar Ullam (2021)

The soundtrack and bsckground score were composed by Vijay Antony and was released on Divo.

No.	Title	Lyrics	Singer(s)	Length
1.	"Naga Naga"	Arun Bharathi	V. M. Mahalingam	4:42
2.	"Thimirupudichavan"	Arun Bharathi	Rahul Nambiar	2:55
3.	"Kavalayodam"	Arun Bharathi	Anurag Kulkarni	4:14
4.	"Nee Unnai Matrikondal"	Eknath	Haricharan	3:53
5.	"Kannadi"	Arun Bharathi	Abhay Jodhpurkar, Padmalatha	4:37
Total length:				20:21

== Release ==
Thimiru Pudichavan was released on 16 November 2018.

=== Home media ===
The satellite and digital rights of the film were sold out to Sun TV and Sun NXT.

== Controversy ==
The producers of films including Sei, Kaatrin Mozhi and Utharavu Maharaja deeply criticized and threatened for legal actions against Vijay Antony for his sudden postponement of Thimiru Pudichavan to 16 November instead of releasing it on 6 November which would significantly affect the screening shows for the above-mentioned films on the particular date. There has been a problem with the number of screens allotted to the film. There was a total of 150 screens allowed to the film, with every step of the process took ahead with proper and legal procedure. But suddenly, another film named "Thimiru pudichaven," which was set to release on Diwali 2018, was postponed to 16 November 2018. As this film was postponed the number of screens for "Sei" was reduced to 60-70 screens.
