= Vijay Antony =

Indian film composer and actor

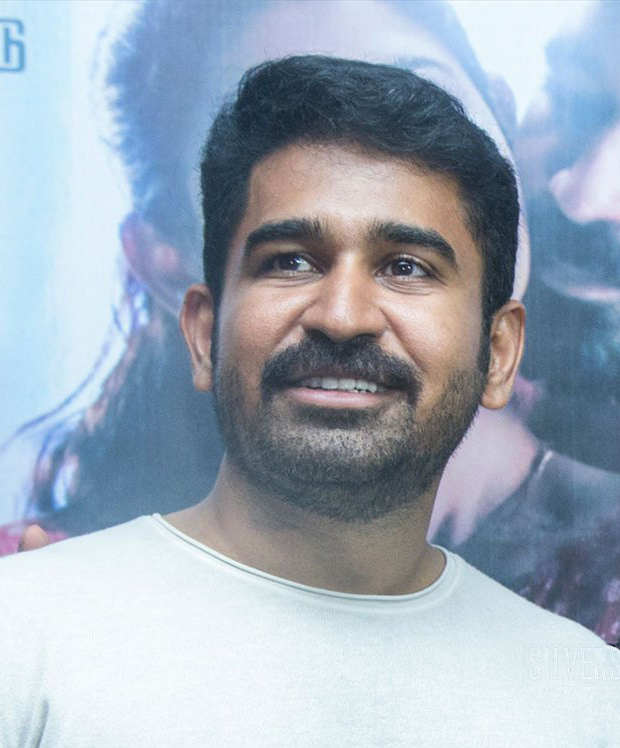
- Vijay Antony at Kolaigaran Press Meet
- Born: Frances Antony Cyril Raja; 24 July 1975 (age 51); Nagercoil, Kanyakumari, Tamil Nadu, India
- Occupations: Music composer; playback singer; actor; film editor; lyricist; audio engineer; film producer; director
- Years active: 2002–present
- Spouse: Fathima
- Children: 2
- Relatives: Samuel Vedanayagam (great-grandfather)

Frances Antony Cyril Raja (born 24 July 1975), known professionally as Vijay Antony, is an Indian musician, actor, film editor, audio engineer, and filmmaker working predominantly in Tamil cinema. He made his debut as music composer in 2005 with Sukran. He made his acting debut in 2012 with Naan and is known for his roles in action thriller films such as Salim (2014) and Pichaikkaran (2016).

== Early life ==
Vijay Antony was born in Nagercoil, Kanyakumari District. When he entered the media and film industry, he had picked Agni as his stage name, but this was changed to Vijay by director S. A. Chandrasekhar who had commented that Agni was not lucky.

Antony was brought up by his mother after his father committed suicide when Antony was 7. He is not a trained musician, but started his career as a sound engineer and later became a music composer. After completing his tertiary education, he established an audio studio called Audio Infotainment and worked there as a sound engineer. In his early days as a music composer, he composed jingles for advertisements, and notable background scores for television shows by conducting research on sound engineering. His music composing venture in movies arrived when Oscar Ravichandran approached Antony to compose music for his film Dishyum, but his music composer debut in movies happened through Sukran, as it was released first.

== Career ==
=== Composing ===
Vijay Antony started his composing career with the 2005 film Sukran. He was nominated for his score in the film Naan Avan Illai (2007).

Antony's songs for the 2008 film Kadhalil Vizhunthen became hits, especially the dappankuthu number Nakka Mukka. He became the first Indian music director to win a Cannes Golden Lion award, for "Nakka Mukka" (for The Times of India) in the Best of Music category. The song was later played at the 2011 Cricket World Cup.

Antony composed the music to a few Tamil soundtracks in 2009, including A Aa E Ee, TN 07 AL 4777, Mariyadhai, Ninaithale Inikkum, and Vettaikaaran.

Antony had composed music for many Tamil films of the early 2010s, including Aval Peyar Thamizharasi, Uthama Puthiran, Vedi, and Velayudham.

Antony made his Telugu composing debut with Mahatma (2009) and his Kannada composing debut with Buddhivantha (2007).

Antony has composed music for most of his own acting films, including Naan (2012), Salim (2014), Pichaikkaran (2016), Saithan (2016), Yaman (2017), Annadurai (2017), Kaali (2018), Thimiru Pudichavan (2019), Pichaikkaran 2 (2023), Mazhai Pidikkatha Manithan (2024), Maargan (2025) and Shakthi Thirumagan (2025).

=== Acting ===
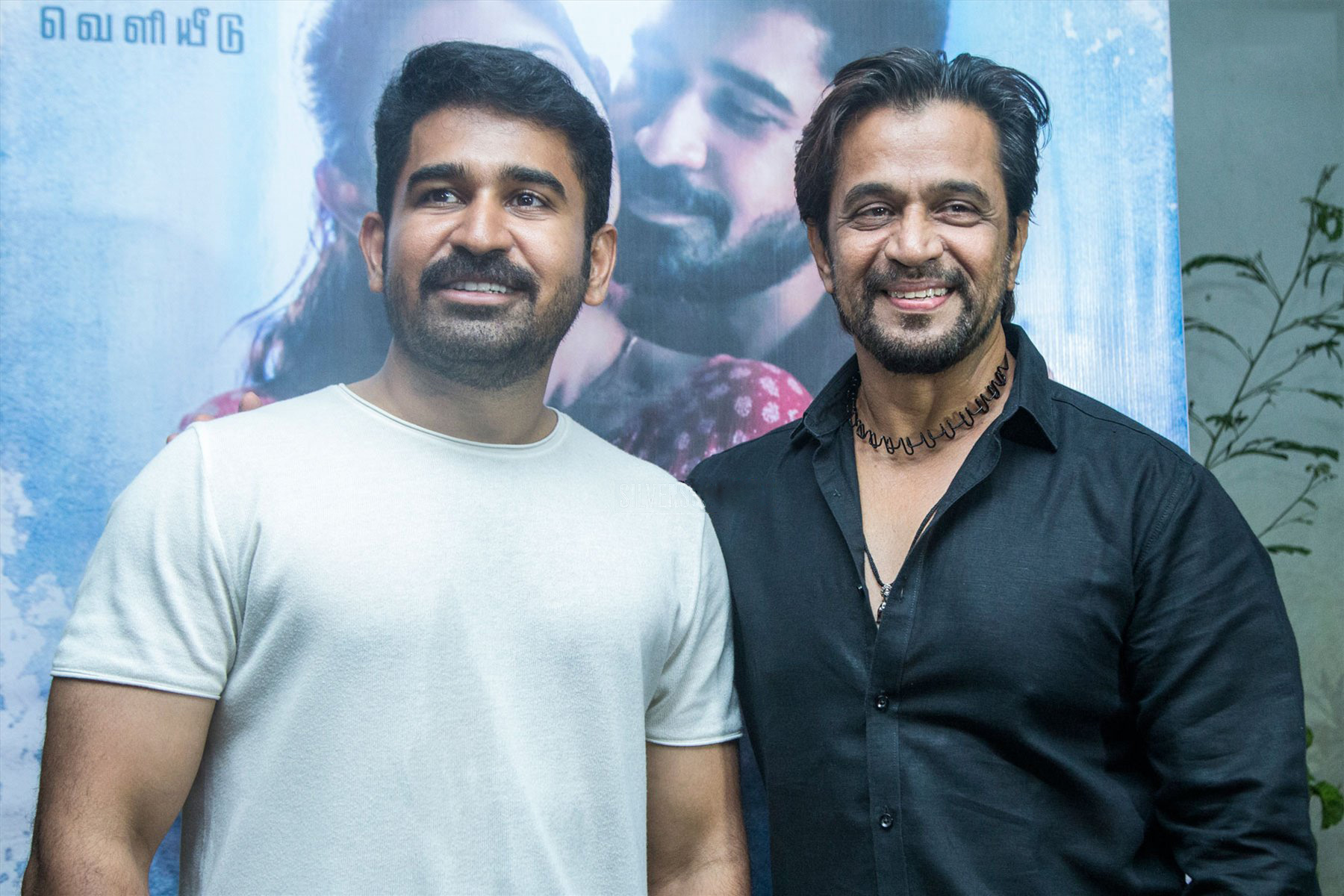
Vijay Antony and Arjun at the Kolaigaran Press Meet

Vijay Antony's acting debut was in the crime thriller Naan where he played the lead role. The film's standalone sequel titled Salim, an action thriller, was his next project as an actor, for which he also composed music.

In 2015, he starred in the romantic comedy India Pakistan, his first acting film for which he was not the music director. In 2016, he chose to star in the action thriller Pichaikkaran (2016), collaborating with his Dishyum director Sasi. It became a commercial success, with overall collections nearing 40 Crore. The Telugu dub Bichagadu was a bigger success than the original. His next was Saithan, an action thriller directed by debutant Pradeep Krishnamoorthy.

He appeared in the 2017 political action thriller Yaman directed by Jeeva Shankar, whom he collaborated with for the second time after Naan. The film released to positive reviews. His next film Annadurai in the same year was an action drama which received mixed reviews. In 2018, he starred in Kaali, a period action film directed by Kiruthiga Udhayanidhi and Thimiru Pudichavan, an action film directed by Ganeshaa. In 2019, he starred in Kolaigaran, an action thriller directed by Andrew Louis and co-starring Arjun. The film opened to highly positive reviews.

Antony made his directorial debut with Pichaikkaran 2 in 2023. Vijay Antony plays the lead role of a romantic hero in Romeo (2024). His 25th film, the political thriller Shakthi Thirumagan, was released earning strong box office collections and audience acclaim.

== Personal life ==
Antony is married to Fatima Vijay Antony, and they had two daughters, Meera and Lara. Meera, the elder daughter, committed suicide on 19 September 2023 at the age of 16 at their home in Chennai. For his films produced by Vijay Antony Film Corporation, Fatima and Meera are credited as either the producer or presenter since 2024; prior to that, it was solely Fatima. His nephew Ajay Dhishan starred alongside him in a few films.

Antony has a well-known great-grandfather, Samuel Vedanayagam Pillai, who was a Tamil poet, novelist, and social worker and is remembered for his authorship of Prathapa Mudaliar Charithram, recognized as the "first modern Tamil novel." Vedanayagam's ideals of women's liberation and education are reflected in this novel.

== Filmography ==
=== Actor ===
Year	Film	Role(s)	Notes
2006	Kizhakku Kadarkarai Salai	Naren Gupta	Cameo appearance
2009	TN 07 AL 4777	Himself	Special appearance in "Aathichudi" song
2012	Naan	Karthik / Mohammed Salim	
2014	Salim	Dr. Mohammed Salim	
2015	India Pakistan	Adv. Karthik	
2016	Pichaikkaran	Arul Selva Kumar	
2016	Nambiar	Himself	Special Appearance in "Aara Amara" song
2016	Saithan	Dinesh, Sharma	Dual role
2017	Yaman	Thamizharasan (Yaman), Arivudainambi	Dual role
2017	Mupparimanam	Himself	Special appearance in "Let's Go Party" song
2017	Annadurai	Annadurai & Thambidurai	Dual role
2018	Kaali	Kaali (Bharath), Young Periyasamy (Samy), Young Maari, Young John	Quadruple roles
2018	Traffic Ramasamy	Himself	Cameo Appearance
2018	Thimiru Pudichavan	Inspector Murugavel	
2019	Kolaigaran	Prabhakaran IPS	
2021	Kodiyil Oruvan	Vijaya Raghavan	
2022	Agni Siragugal	Seenu	Unreleased Film
2023	Tamilarasan	Inspector Tamilarasan	
2023	Pichaikkaran 2	Vijay Gurumoorthy, Sathya	Dual role
2023	Kolai	Vinayak	
2023	Raththam	Ranjith Kumar	
2024	Romeo	Arivazhagan / Vikram	
2024	Mazhai Pidikkatha Manithan	Salim / 2223 / Antony	
2024	Hitler	Selva	
2025	Maargan	ADGP Dhruv Guvarak	
2025	Shakthi Thirumagan	Kittu	25th Film
2026	Pookie	Bar dancer / temple singer	Cameo appearance in the songs "Manasu Valikithu" and "Love Advice"
2026	Nooru Saami	Ezhumalai	
2026	Appa Kutty	Suriya	

=== As editor ===
Year	Film	Notes
2017	Annadurai	
2018	Thimiru Pudichavan	
2021	Kodiyil Oruvan	
2023	Pichaikkaran 2	
2024	Romeo	
2026	Pookie	

=== As director ===
Year	Film	Notes
2023	Pichaikkaran 2	

== Discography ==
=== Music director ===
Year	Film	Language	Notes
2005	Sukran	Tamil	
2006	Dishyum	Tamil	
2006	Iruvar Mattum	Tamil	
2007	Naan Avanillai	Tamil	Nominated, Filmfare Best Music Director Award (Tamil); Background Score by D. Imman
2007	Ninaithaley	Tamil	
2008	Pasumpon Thevar Varalaru	Tamil	Documentary film
2008	Pandhayam	Tamil	
2008	Buddhivantha	Kannada	Remake of Naan Avan Illai
2008	Kadhalil Vizhunthen	Tamil	Nominated, Filmfare Best Music Director Award (Tamil); Cannes Golden Lion Award for Best Commercial Music (Nakka Mukka) "Nakka Mukka" was played at the 2011 Cricket World Cup
2009	A Aa E Ee	Tamil	
2009	TN 07 AL 4777	Tamil	Nominated, Vijay Award for Best Music Director Nominated, Vijay Award for Favourite Song
2009	Mariyadhai	Tamil	
2009	Ninaithale Inikkum	Tamil	Nominated, Filmfare Best Music Director Award (Tamil)
2009	Mahatma	Telugu	Reused songs from Dishyum, Kadhalil Vizhunthen and Naan Avanillai
2009	Vettaikaaran	Tamil	Winner, Vijay Award for Favourite Song – Chinna Thamarai; Nominated, Vijay Award for Best Music Director
2010	Rasikkum Seemane	Tamil	
2010	Aval Peyar Thamizharasi	Tamil	
2010	Angadi Theru	Tamil	2 Songs and Score
2010	Kanagavel Kaaka	Tamil	
2010	Uthama Puthiran	Tamil	
2011	Sattapadi Kutram	Tamil	
2011	Yuvan Yuvathi	Tamil	
2011	Vedi	Tamil	
2011	Velayudham	Tamil	
2012	Naan	Tamil	Nominated, 2nd South Indian International Movie Awards For Best Music Director
2012	Daruvu	Telugu	Reused songs from TN 07 AL 4777, Ninaithale Inikkum, Vettaikaaran , and Uthamaputhiran
2012	Sattam Oru Iruttarai	Tamil	
2013	Haridas	Tamil	
2014	Kathai Thiraikathai Vasanam Iyakkam	Tamil	1 song ("A for Azhagirukku")
2014	Salim	Tamil	
2015	Aavi Kumar	Tamil	
2016	Pichaikkaran	Tamil	
2016	Asthitva	Kannada	Remake of Naan
2016	Nambiyaar	Tamil	
2016	Saithan	Tamil	
2017	Yaman	Tamil	
2017	Annadurai	Tamil	
2018	Kaali	Tamil	
2018	Thimiru Pudichavan	Tamil	
2021	Iruvar Ullam	Tamil	Delayed release; shot in 2012–13
2023	Pichaikkaran 2	Tamil	
2024	Mazhai Pidikkatha Manithan	Tamil	1 song ("Ivan Yaaro")
2025	Madha Gaja Raja	Tamil	Delayed release; shot in 2012
2025	Maargan	Tamil	
2025	Shakthi Thirumagan	Tamil	
2026	Pookie	Tamil	

=== Playback Singer ===
- Touring Talkies (2015) ("Touring Talkies" song, co-sung with Vivek; Mukesh Mohamed, Sathyan Mahalingam)
- Madha Gaja Raja (2025) ("My Dear Loveru" song, co-sung with Vishal; "Nee Dhana Nee Dhana"; "Thumbakki Thumbai")

=== Lyricist ===
- Sukran (2005) ("Sukran" Theme Music and "Suppose Unnai" song)
- Dishyum (2006) ("Dailamo Dailamo" song)
- A Aa E Ee (2009) ("Mena Minuki" song)
- TN 07 AL 4777 (2009) ("Aathichudi" song)
- Kanagavel Kaaka (2010) ("Minsarame" song)
- Sattapadi Kutram (2011) ("Rathiri Nerathu Remix" and "Yedhedho" song)
- Pichaikkaran (2016) ("Pichaikkaran Theme Music" song)
- Pichaikkaran 2 (2023) ("Bikili" and "Anti Bikili Theme" song)
- Romeo (2024)
- Shakthi Thirumagan (2025) ("Kaaladheera" song)
- Pookie (2026) ("Manasu Valikithu","JilleyJuice","Kothanga Jilley Juice", "Mosquito Man", "Uthamanakura"and "Love Advice", "Jillahi" song)

=== Television ===
- 2002 Chinna Papa Periya Papa (Season 1) (Credited as Agni) (Sun TV)
- 2005 Malargal (Sun TV)
- 2005 Kettimelam (Jaya TV)
- 2006 Kana Kaanum Kaalangal (Vijay TV)
- 2007 Kadhalikka Neramillai (Vijay TV)
- 2007 Megala (Sun TV)
- 2015 Chinna Papa Periya Papa (Season 2) (Sun TV)

=== Judge ===
Year	Title	Role	Language	Network(s)	Ref
2024–present	Mahanadigai	Judge	Tamil	Zee Tamil	
