= Pookie (film) =

2026 Indian film by Ganesh Chandra

- Theatrical release poster
- Directed by: Ganesh Chandra
- Written by: Puthiya Parithi
- Produced by: Fatima Vijay Antony
- Starring: Ajay Dhishan; R. K. Dhanusha; Pandiarajan; Sunil; Lakshmi Manchu
- Cinematography: Ganesh Chandra
- Edited by: Vijay Antony
- Music by: Vijay Antony
- Production company: Vijay Antony Film Corporation
- Release date: 13 February 2026
- Country: India
- Language: Tamil

Pookie is a 2026 Indian Tamil-language romantic comedy film directed and filmed by cinematographer-turned-director Ganesh Chandra in his directorial debut. The film stars Ajay Dhishan in the lead role alongside R. K. Dhanusha as the lead actress in her debut. The film is produced by Fatima Vijay Antony under Vijay Antony Film Corporation banner, while the film has music composed and editing handled by Vijay Antony.

Pookie released in theatres on 13 February 2026 and received mixed reviews from critics.

== Cast ==
- Ajay Dhishan as Kailash
- R. K. Dhanusha as Aazhi
- Pandiarajan as Kailash's father
- Sunil as Vikas Vibes swamiji
- Lakshmi Manchu as Dr. Chithra
- Indumathy Manikandan as Kailash's mother
- Aaditya Kathir as Kailash's friend
- Vivek Prasanna as Kailash's friend
- Black Pandi as Kailash's gym mate
- Sathya SK as Gym trainer
- M. J. Shriram as Aazhi's father
- Radha
- Ashwin Ram as Rahul
- Shiyara Sharmi as Kavya
- Priyanka
- Manda Fack as Ramu's friend
- A. Rajamani Paati as Aazhi's grandmother
- Varun
- Arun
- Mridhula
- Aishwarya Ragupathi as Keerthi
- Anjali
- Thanga Prakash as Kailash's friend
- Mridhula
- Sathya
- Shaju
- Ajith Koshy as Murugeshan, Kavya's father
- Saanvika Shree as Dr. Chithra's kid
- Dubbing Dappa as the voice of dogs and a cat
- Vijay Antony in a cameo appearance in 2 songs
- Silambarasan (archival footage, including from Pathu Thala audio launch)

== Production ==
On 2 September 2025, Ajay Dhishan of Maargan (2025) fame was announced as the lead actor in Vijay Antony's next production venture. Marking his 18th film under his production house Vijay Antony Film Corporation headed by his wife Fatima Vijay Antony, the announcement for this film was made through a first-look poster. R. K. Dhanusha was cast in as the lead actress in her debut alongside Sunil in an important role in the film. The film is directed and filmed by cinematographer-turned-director Ganesh Chandra in his directorial debut, while its story, screenplay and dialogues are written by Puthiya Parithi.

== Music ==
The film has soundtrack and background scored by Vijay Antony. The first single "Manasu Valikithu" was released on 26 November 2025. The second single "Love Advice Song" was released on 20 December 2025. The third single "Pudikaley Pudikaley" was released on 5 February 2026. The fourth single "Jilley Juice" was released on 9 February 2026.

All music is composed by Vijay Antony.

Track listing
No.	Title	Lyrics	Singer(s)	Length
1.	"Manasu Valikithu"	Vijay Antony	Vijay Antony
2.	"Love Advice Song"	Vijay Antony	Vijay Antony
3.	"Pudikaley Pudikaley"	Lavarathan	Santosh Hariharan, Rukhsar Bandhukia
4.	"Jilley Juice"	Vijay Antony	Vijay Antony

== Release ==
=== Theatrical ===
Pookie released in theatres on 13 February 2026.

=== Home media ===
The post-theatrical satellite and digital rights have been acquired by Zee Tamil and ZEE5, respectively.

== Reception ==
Pookie received mixed reviews from critics.

Abhinav Subramanian of The Times of India gave 3 out of 5 stars and wrote "Pookie knows its audience and plays to them with a polished hand. It connects in pieces. Whether those pieces add up to a whole is another question." Akshay Kumar of Cinema Express gave 1.5 out of 5 stars and wrote "Pookie mistakes cultural referencing for cultural understanding. By reducing Gen-Z love to buzzwords, the film not only misreads its subject but also robs its characters of interiority."
