= Arun Bharathi =

Indian lyricist

- Born: Arun Kumar; Uthamapalayam, Theni District, Tamil Nadu
- Occupation: Lyricist
- Years active: 2017–present
- Known for: Annathe, Viswasam
- Spouse: Padmavathy

Arun Bharathi (born Arun Kumar) is an Indian lyricist who works primarily in Tamil-language films.

== Early life ==
Arun Bharathi was born in Uthamapalayam, Theni district, Tamil Nadu. He adopted the pen name "Arun Bharathi" in honour of Tamil poet Bharatiyar. He is married to Padmavathy.

== Filmography ==
| Year | Film | Songs | Ref |
|---|---|---|---|
| 2017 | Annadurai | All songs | |
| 2018 | Kaali | "Amma Alugiren", "Yugam Noorai" | |
| 2018 | Yemaali | "Nilave Illa Vanam" | |
| 2018 | Sandhakozhi 2 | "Meesa Vacha Vettaikaran" | |
| 2018 | Thimiru Pudichavan | "Naga Naga", "Thimiru pudichavan", "Kannadi", "Kavalayodum" | |
| 2019 | Kolaikagaran | "Andavane Thunai" | |
| 2019 | Viswasam | "Thalle Thillaley", "Danga Danga" | |
| 2019 | Dhilluku Dhuddu 2 | "Kathadi Pol" | |
| 2020 | Walter | "Yaarai Thedi Nenjame" , "Oru Nodiyinil", "Varalam Vaa" | |
| 2021 | Kabadadaari | "Kabadadaari" | |
| 2021 | Kodiyil Oruvan | "Naan Varuven" | |
| 2021 | Annaatthe | "Vaa Saamy" | |
| 2023 | Pichaikaran 2 | "Koyil Silaye", "Nana Buluku", "Kalloorum Poove" | |
| 2023 | Erumbu | "Oru Oorula" | |
| 2025 | Trauma | "Yaar Yaaro" | |
| 2025 | Maargan | "Ulagaye Muzhuvathum Verukkiren" | |
| 2025 | Gangers | "Athiri Puthiri" | |
| 2026 | Appa Kutty | "yean indha pennukku" | |

== Awards ==
| Year | Film | Award | Category | Result | Ref |
|---|---|---|---|---|---|
| 2022 | Annadurai | Edison Awards | Best Inspirational Lyricist | Won | |
