= Kaali (2018 film) =

2018 Tamil action drama film directed by Kiruthiga udhayanidhi

- Theatrical release poster
- Directed by: Kiruthiga Udhayanidhi
- Written by: Kiruthiga Udhayanidhi
- Produced by: Fatima Vijay Antony
- Starring: Vijay Antony; Anjali; Sunaina; Shilpa Manjunath; Amritha Aiyer
- Cinematography: Richard M. Nathan
- Edited by: Lawrence Kishore
- Music by: Vijay Antony
- Production company: Vijay Antony Film Corporation
- Distributed by: Red Giant Movies
- Release date: May 18, 2018
- Running time: 138 minutes
- Country: India
- Language: Tamil

Kaali is a 2018 Indian Tamil-language action drama film written and directed by Kiruthiga Udhayanidhi, starring Vijay Antony in a quadruple role alongside Anjali, Sunaina, Shilpa Manjunath, and Amritha Aiyer. Produced by Fatima Vijay Antony, the film began production in March 2017 and was released on 18 May 2018. The film was dubbed and released in Hindi as Jawab: the Justice.

== Plot ==
Bharath, a surgeon in America, experiences recurring dreams about a bull and a woman's voice. After his mother's emergency transplant surgery, Bharath decides to be her donor, but his father reveals he is adopted. After his mother's successful surgery, Bharath goes to India to find out about his biological parents. He meets villager Gopi and learns that his mother's name is Parvathy, and his real name is Kaali. Bharath assumes Kaali's given name, but nobody knows his father. He sets up a free clinic in the village and conducts a DNA match test on patients. It leads to a decrease in the number of patients coming to a local Siddha doctor named Valli, who becomes upset but later learns Kaali's good nature.

Meanwhile, Kaali and Gopi have suspicions about the village head, Periyasamy, because he is left-handed, like Kaali. They get him drunk and ask about his past, where a young Periyasamy is in love with his college mate, but they face opposition from their parents due to caste differences. They plan to elope when they find that his girlfriend is pregnant, but due to problems at his house and communal riots in the village, Periyasamy arrives later than expected. His girlfriend consumes poison and dies upon thinking that he has betrayed her. When Kaali asks his girlfriend's name, Periyasamy tells him that she is Thenmozhi, and Kaali realises that Periyasamy is not his father.

Later, in a brawl at a local bar, Kaali and Gopi come across a man named "Thala Vettiyaan" Maari, who has the name "Parvathy" tattooed on his arm. They try to find out about him, and he tells them the tattoo is his girlfriend's name. A young Maari is a thief and goes to a house in the middle of the night to steal. He finds a woman named Parvathy trying to kill her abusive husband, Gounder, who forcefully married her. Maari threatens Parvathy and steals money and jewels from her. Once Maari leaves the house, Parvathy follows him and tries to retrieve the stolen things, but he overpowers her. This incident blossoms into love, and they try to elope to escape Gounder. Gounder finds out about the affair and orders his men to kill them. Parvathy dies while attempting to save Maari. In a rage, Maari chops off Gounder's head, and this begins a communal riot in the village. Kaali finds that Maari is also not his father.

Kaali finds a match with an older woman named Vellathayee, who may be his grandmother. She tells him about a daughter who worked in the church and died in a fire. Kaali discovers his mother is Poomayilu, not Parvathy. Kaali becomes suspicious of Father John, a kindhearted man who has the villagers' respect. Kaali matches John's DNA and reads his diary, where he learns about his past. John, a young Christian priest, discovers casteism and abuse in the village and abolishes it. He teaches unity and aims to abolish the caste system. However, some upper caste members object, including Gounder. Gounder's henchman, Das, and his men thrash him, and Poomayilu tends to him. John accidentally makes love with Poomayilu, and she becomes pregnant. John repents to a priest and tries to convince Poomayilu to elope, but she refuses, fearing that the village will return to their old ways if he leaves.

While this conversation happens, Das sets fire to all the lower caste community's huts in the wake of Gounder's murder. A communal riot begins, and many people die in the fire. The police arrest Das and vows to take revenge on John. Poomayilu is also presumed to be dead. John becomes a priest and has been serving the village as per Poomayilu's wish since then. In reality, Poomayilu escaped the town without anyone's knowledge, gave birth to Kaali, and lived under a different identity as Parvathy until she died. Kaali now finds that his biological father is John. Das leaves jail and tries to kill John, but Kaali saves John, and a villager kills Das. John thanks Kaali for his help. Kaali chooses to hide the truth from John and let him continue his service to the community. He leaves the village as he completes his mission and takes his grandmother and Valli to America.

== Cast ==
- Vijay Antony in a quadruple role as
  - Dr.Bharath alias Kaali
  - Young Periyasamy
  - Young Maari
  - Young John
- Anjali as Punitha Valli, Kaali's love interest
- Sunaina as Poomayilu (Parvathy), Kaali's biological mother
- Shilpa Manjunath as Parvathy
- Amritha Aiyer as Thenmozhi, Periyasamy's love interest
- Jayaprakash as Father John, Kaali's biological father
- Nassar as "Thala Vettiyaan" Maari
- Madhusudhan Rao as Periyasamy
- Yogi Babu as Gopi
- Vela Ramamoorthy as Gounder
- R. K. Suresh as Das, Gounder's henchman
- Sreeja Ravi as Bharath's adopted mother
- Ashok Pandian as Bharath's adopted father
- Shanthi Mani as Vellathayee, Poomayilu's mother
- Chitra Lakshmanan as Play Director
- Jaya Rao as Periyasamy's father
- R. S. G. Chelladurai as Old Man
- Vazhakku Enn Muthuraman as Orphanage Manager

== Production ==
In January 2017, it was reported that Vijay Antony would work on a project to be directed by Kiruthiga Udhayanidhi, who had earlier made Vanakkam Chennai (2013). In March, Vijay Antony confirmed that he would star and also produce the film, which was titled Kaali, with Kiruthiga revealing it would be a "family drama". Four actresses were cast in the film: Anjali, Sunaina, Amritha Aiyer, and Shilpa Manjunath.

After shooting for the film alongside his commitments in Srinivasan's Annadurai (2017), Vijay Antony chose to briefly prioritise his work for Kaali in April 2017, after Annadurai's co-producer Radhika underwent a tax raid on her properties. He later continued to shoot for both films simultaneously.

== Soundtrack ==
Kaali

Soundtrack album by Vijay Antony
- Released: 24 January 2018
- Recorded: 2018
- Genre: Feature film soundtrack
- Length: 21:28
- Language: Tamil
- Label: Divo
- Producer: Vijay Antony

Vijay Antony chronology
Annadurai (2017)	Kaali (2018)	Thimiru Pudichavan (2018)

The soundtrack of Kaali consists of five songs composed by Vijay Antony.

Tracklist
No.	Title	Lyrics	Singer(s)	Length
1.	"Arumbey"	Vivek	Nivas, Janaki Iyer	04:52
2.	"Amma Alugiren"	Arun Bharathi	Nivas	04:17
3.	"Yugam Noorai"	Arun Bharathi	Vedala Hemachandra, Sangeetha Rajeshwaran	05:21
4.	"Poorayo"	Thamizhanangu	Deepak	02:02
5.	"Manusha Vaa Munnera"	Madhan Karky	Jagadeesh	04:56
Total length:				21:28

== Critical reception ==
A Chennaivision reviewer wrote: "On the whole, the first half of Kaali is impressive and interesting. But things fail to impress us much in the second half. It is a mixed ride of positive and negative things." Ashameera Aiyappan of The Indian Express wrote, "Kaali would have been more effective had it been an anthology of three stories of estranged love set in late 1980s, where society plays the devil."
