= Pandi (actor) =

Indian actor

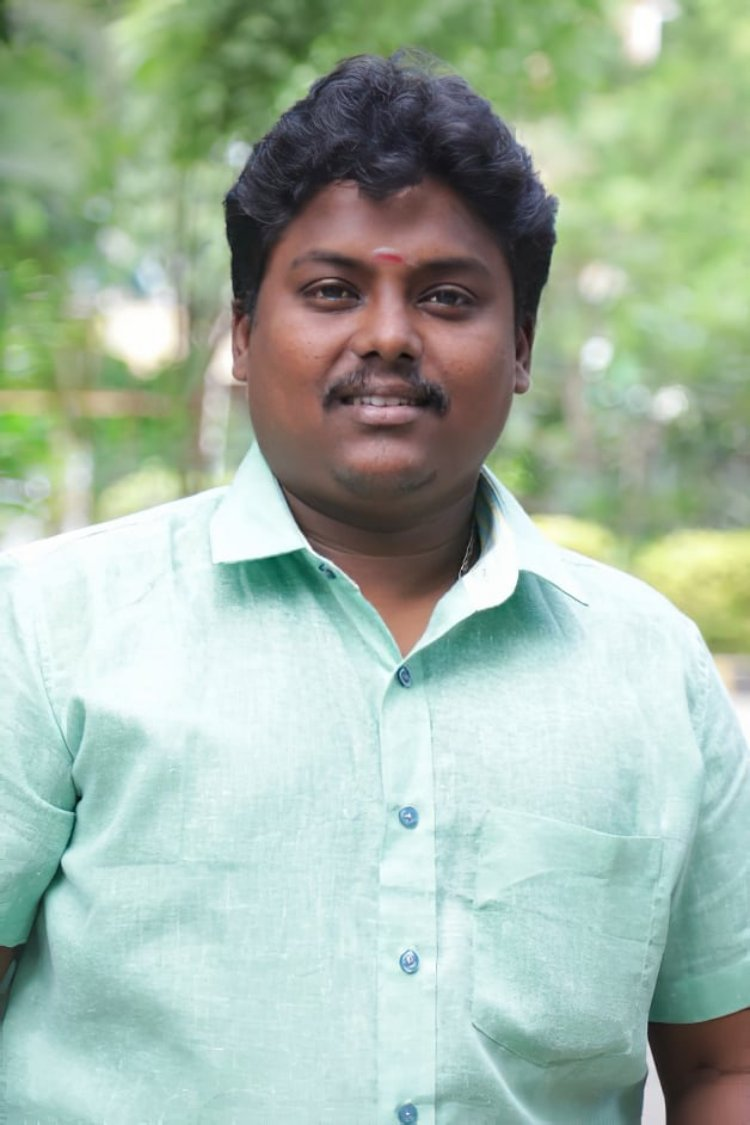
- Born: Lingeswaran; Madurai
- Other name: Black Pandi
- Occupation: Actor
- Spouse: Padmini

Lingeswaran, known professionally as Pandi, is a comedy actor who has acted in Tamil films and television shows . He played minor roles in a few films before joining television. He is known for his role as "Pandi" in the popular Tamil soap opera Kana Kaanum Kaalangal in Star Vijay and later participated in Jodi Number One season 3. His breakthrough came with Angadi Theru in 2010.

== Personal life ==
He married Padmini, an MBA graduate on 1 December 2013.

== Filmography ==
=== Films ===
Year	Title	Role	Notes
2000	Koodi Vazhnthal Kodi Nanmai	Boxer Kishnan's son	
2001	Nageswari		Uncredited
2003	Well Done		
2004	Autograph	Young Oolamookkan Subramani	
2004	Ghilli	Road side vendor	Uncredited
2004	Singara Chennai	Surya's friend	
2007	Lee		
2007	Muruga		
2008	Theekuchi	Kuravan's son	
2010	Angaadi Theru	Marimuthu	
2010	Maanja Velu	Velu's friend	
2010	Kalloori Kalangal	Dappa	
2010	Ennodu Nee Irundhaal		
2011	Pathinaaru	Sakkarai	
2011	Deiva Thirumagal	Muruga	
2011	Velayutham	Pandi	
2012	Neerparavai	Anthony	
2012	Saattai	Murugan	
2012	Paagan	Machali	
2013	Masani		
2013	Vanakkam Chennai	Murali	
2014	Jilla	Murugesan	
2014	Vennila Veedu		
2014	Poojai	Pandi	
2014	Asha Black	Pandi	Malayalam film
2014	Nee Naan Nizhal	Pandi	
2014	Velmurugan Borewells		
2015	Agathinai	Ayyanaar's friend	
2015	Vethu Vettu	Machaikaalai's friend	
2015	Sakalakala Vallavan	Chinnasamy's friend	
2015	Thiruttu Rail		
2016	Peigal Jaakkirathai		
2016	Oopiri	Seenu's friend	Bilingual film
2016	Thozha	Seenu's friend	Bilingual film
2016	Nee Enbathu		
2017	Kanavu Variyam	Sakkarai	
2017	Keikraan Meikkiran		
2017	Pandigai	Tirupathi	
2017	Paakanum Pola Irukku		
2018	Prema Baraha	Sanjay's friend	Bilingual film
2018	Sollividava	Sanjay's friend	Bilingual film
2018	Keni		
2018	Karthikeyanum Kaanamal Pona Kadhaliyum		
2019	Thavam		
2021	Mirugaa		
2022	Mr Daddy		
2022	Mofussil	Azhagu	
2023	3.6.9	Edward	
2024	Park	Dish	
2025	EMI		
2025	Nirvagam Porupalla		
2026	The Bed		
2026	Pookie	Kailash's gym mate	

=== Television ===
Year	Title	Notes	Channel
2000	Kathai Neram : Muradan Magan	Chandran	Sun TV
2002	Metti Oli		Sun TV
2003	Kolangal	Kannan	Sun TV
2006–2009	Kana Kaanum Kaalangal	Pandi	STAR Vijay
2009	Jodi Number One	Season 3 participant	STAR Vijay
2011	Kana Kaanum Kaalangal Kallooriyin Kadhai	Thanga Pandi	STAR Vijay
2018	Star Wars	Season 2 participant	Sun TV
2026	Bigg Boss 10	Contestant	STAR Vijay

=== Web series ===
Year	Title	Network	Notes
2020	Singa Penne	ZEE5	
