= Patra (film) =

- Directed by: Jayantan
- Written by: Jayantan
- Produced by: V. Gandhikumar
- Starring: Mithun Dev; Vaidehi; Sam Paul
- Cinematography: Sunoj Velayuthan
- Music by: Srikrishna
- Production company: GK Cinemaas
- Release date: 20 March 2015
- Running time: 109 minutes
- Country: India
- Language: Tamil

Patra is a 2015 Indian Tamil-language action drama film written and directed by Jayantan and starring Mithun Dev, Vaidehi, and Sam Paul. It was released on 20 March 2015.

== Cast ==
- Mithun Dev as Kannan
- Vaidehi as Uma
- Sam Paul as Dhana
- Aadesh Bala
- Captain Ganesh
- Puli Pandi as Karikalan
- Vinod Sagar

== Reception ==
Malini Mannath of The New Indian Express wrote, "despite the glitches, the film, a crisp 109 minutes, is a far better product than what one would have expected from a debutant maker and his team of freshers". A critic from iFlicks wrote, "Director Jayanthan has tried to narrate an old storyline in a new way but the movie fails to create an impact. Sri Krishna's music and Velayuthan's cinematography are not up to the mark". A critic from Dinamalar called the film a new wine in an old bottle and said it was not praiseworthy despite having a good crew (music, cinematography, editing, writing, direction).
