= Yaman (film) =

2017 Indian film by Jeeva Shankar

- Promotional poster
- Directed by: Jeeva Shankar
- Written by: Jeeva Shankar
- Produced by: A. Subaskaran; Fatima Vijay Antony
- Starring: Vijay Antony; Miya; Thiagarajan
- Cinematography: Jeeva Shankar
- Edited by: Veera Senthil Raj
- Music by: Vijay Antony
- Production companies: Lyca Productions; Vijay Antony Film Corporation
- Release date: 24 February 2017
- Running time: 159 minutes
- Country: India
- Language: Tamil

Yaman (English: Lord of Death) is a 2017 Indian Tamil-language political action thriller film written and directed by Jeeva Shankar. Co-produced by Lyca Productions and Vijay Antony Film Corporation, the film stars Vijay Antony in a dual role as father and son, alongside Miya, while Thiagarajan portrays another pivotal character. The film, which features Jeeva Shankar and Vijay Antony doubling up as the cinematographer and the music composer respectively, was released. The movie was a commercial success.

== Plot ==
During the 1980s, Arivudai Nambi was selected for the MLA seat by Thangapandi’s father rather than Thangapandi, Nambi’s friend. At the same time, Arivudai Namib’s wife, Agaliya, gives birth to a son named Tamizharasan. Thangapandi conspires with Agaliya’s brother, Kathir, to kill Arivudai Nambi to become MLA. One night, Thangapandi and Nambi’s brother-in-law brutally murder Arivudai Nambi and then Pandi murders Kathir. Eventually, Agaliya kills herself and Pandi is elected as MLA. Arivudai Nambi's father raises Tamizharasan by himself.

Thirty years later, Tamizharasan’s grandfather has to have an operation to remove cancer but it cost 3 lakhs. He finds a wallet at a bar and returns it to a man. The man, Govindan, receives a phone call asking someone to go to jail for an accident, and they will be paid 4 lakhs. Tamizh negotiates for 5 lakhs and goes to jail. He meets with Manimaran, and then eventually beats up Selvam. He then saves Manimaran after an assassination attempt in jail. Tamizh meets with a motorbike accident and meets with Anjana. He then falls in love with Anjana.

Manimaran hires goons to kill Tamizh in the sea, but someone calls Tamizh and Tamizh smartly escapes death. Manimaran eventually dies. Karunakaran was the one who called him and decided to protect Tamizh. Tamizh meets Pandi’s aide, Thiyagu, and meets Pandi and hallucinates Arivudai Nambi. Pandi leases Tamizh a bar behind Central station. Selvam and Pandi decides to kill Tamizh. Selvam hires contract killers from outside town to kill Tamizh, but Tamizh smartly beats them up. Tamizh meets up with Selvam and Pandi and threatens to kill Selvam. Selvam tells that Pandi told him to kill Tamizh, and just as Selvam is about to reveal the truth, Pandi takes the gun and kills him. Tamizh eventually decides to step into politics.

Anjana meets with Tamizh and informs him that someone has been constantly calling her and sexually harassing her and she believes that the caller has political support. Tamizh meets with Pandi and discovers that Anjana’s caller is Pandi’s son and Tamizh warns him at gunpoint for his son to apologise to Anjana. Some goons attempt to kill Thamizh using Molotov cocktails and also target his grandfather, and Thamizh’s grandfather is admitted to the hospital. However, he dies. Anjana meets with Tamizh, apologises, and conveys her love. Tamizh meets with Karunakaran and tells him that Thiyagu should become a witness against Pandi. Tamizh then informs Sakthi, his henchman, to kidnap Thiyagu’s family and forces Thiyagu to go to the media and speak against Pandi. Thamizharasan marries Anjana and invites Karunakaran to their wedding. Tamizh states that he wants to contest the upcoming elections as a candidate for VTMK (Veera Tamizhar Muentra Kazhagam).

Karunakaran then decides to conspire with Thangapandi to murder Tamizh before the election. Pandi says that he will kill Tamizh and informs Karunakaran that he needs Thiyagu to die for the court cases to disappear. His party inform Tamizh that he has been selected as a candidate for the election, and hears that Thiyagu has met with a fatal car accident. Karunakaran tells Sakthi to kill Tamizh, and he will give him the bar and parking lease. Tamizh contemplates Thiyagu’s death. The following day, Tamizh decides to let Anjana stay home and goes to the party rally. Tamizh tells Karunakaran that he knows about the conspiracy to kill him and says that he plans to end the “political game”. Karunakaran tells Sakthi that Tamizh knows of their plan and tells him to kill Tamizh. Sakthi then tells Karunakaran that he was the one who exposed Karunakaran’s plan to Tamizh.

Eventually, Tamizh’s goons kill Councillor Anbazhagan during a planned meeting with a woman and they also kidnap Thangapandi. During a riot at the rally, Sakthi stabs Karunakaran in the back and then sets his car afire. During Karunakaran’s funeral, Tamizh informs the media that Thangapandi masterminded Thiyagu’s and Karunakaran’s deaths. Tamizh wins the MLA election and meets with Pandi at an abandoned warehouse, and fatally hangs Pandi, avenging his father’s death.

== Cast ==
- Vijay Antony in a dual role as
  - Tamizharasan aka Yaman, Arivudai Nambi's son
  - Arivudai Nambi, Tamizharasan's father
- Miya as Agalya (Anjana)
- Shilpa Manjunath as Agalya, Nambi's wife and Tamizharasan's mother
- Thiagarajan as Karunakaran
- G. Marimuthu as Manimaran
- Jayakumar as Selvarathinam (Selvam)
- Aroul D. Shankar as Thangapandian (Pandi)
- Vettai Muthukumar as Kadhir
- Charle as Thiagarajan (Thyagu)
- Swaminathan as Govindhan
- Sangili Murugan as Tamizharasan's grandfather and Nambi's father
- Arjai as Sakthi
- Sreeja Ravi as Karunakaran's wife
- D. R. K. Kiran as Anbazhagan
- Gajaraj as Party Member
- Ashok Pandian as Police

== Production ==
In December 2015, Jeeva Shankar announced that his next film would feature Vijay Antony and the pair would collaborate after working together in Naan (2012). Shankar had initially discussed the script with other actors including Vijay Sethupathi, who had requested the director to finish the script in two months, but Shankar took eight months and Vijay Sethupathi became busy with other projects. Antony's availability meant that Shankar chose to cast him in the lead role. He revealed that the film would be a political thriller film set in Chennai and Antony would portray the character who brings "the message of death". Miya was signed on as the film's lead actress during January 2016, while Lyca Productions announced that they would produce the film. Antony put on weight for the film and began working on the project during the same month, with the producers revealing that the film would be shot within eighty days. Thiagarajan joined the film's cast during May 2016 and revealed that he would portray the lead antagonist, appearing as a "political mastermind".

Several scenes were shot in Chennai, while a prison set was erected in Pondicherry for the shoot. A song was shot in Mumbai during July 2016 featuring Vijay Antony and Miya. The team later moved on to film sequences in Georgia during July 2016.

== Soundtrack ==
Yaman

Soundtrack album by Vijay Antony
- Released: 4 February 2017
- Recorded: 2016
- Genre: Feature film soundtrack
- Label: Lyca Music

Vijay Antony chronology
Saithan (2016)	Yaman (2017)	Annadurai (2017)

The film's score and soundtrack were composed by Vijay Antony. The song "Yem Mela Kai Vachaa Gaali" was released as a single in September 2016, during the Tamil Nadu Premier League match of Kovai vs Chepauk held in Tirunelveli. The album was released on 4 February 2017 by Lyca Music.

Tamil (original)
No.	Title	Lyrics	Singer(s)	Length
1.	"Yem Mela Kai Vachaa Gaali"	Annamalai	Hemachandra, Chetan, Kumar	4:30
2.	"Damelo Dumelo"	P. Vetriselvan	Saranya, Maria Roe Vincent, El Fe	4:31
3.	"Kadavul Ezhuthum"	Ko. Sesha	Yazin Nizar, Janaki Iyer	4:57
4.	"Sigaram Chella"	Eknath	Jagadeesh Kumar, Ranjith Unni, Velmurugan, Ayappan	2:44
5.	"Neeye Thaniyaai"	Muthumilan	Jagadeesh	2:44

== Release ==
The film had a worldwide theatrical release on 24 February 2017. The satellite rights of the film were sold to Zee Tamil. The film received mixed to positive reviews from both critics and the audience. Sify.com gave the film a positive review, stating "to conclude, Yaman is a film with many layers, and one with solid drama at its core, which makes it such an engaging watch" and that "it is that rare kind of film which transports you bang in the middle of its action". In their review of the film, The Hindu found "strong performances and detailing save the day for Vijay Antony's Yaman... the film's release timing is apt in the country's politically active scenario". A critic from The Times of India wrote "overall, a little more pace, doing away a duet song which appears in the second half which makes audience yawn and slight tone down of heroism would have worked wonders". The Indian Express called it "a watchable political drama, which has come out at the right time in the light of the ongoing political crisis in Tamil Nadu". Likewise, The Deccan Chronicle's review mentioned, "the film works only in parts". The New Indian Express stated "despite the glitches, and with more positives than negatives, Yaman is a fairly interesting watch". Baradwaj Rangan of Film Companion wrote "There's too much dialogue, explaining what we already know. And Vijay Antony isn't actor enough to clue us in to the character's inner workings...To his credit, he wants to veer away from the mass-hero template. His films actually have a story. If only he'd find better people to tell them."
