= Richard M. Nathan =

Indian cinematographer

- Born: Richard Maria Nathan; 3 June; Tamil Nadu, India
- Education: Loyola College, Chennai
- Occupation: Cinematographer
- Spouse: Arasi Arul
- Website: www.richardmnathan.com

Richard M. Nathan is an Indian cinematographer, who works in the Tamil film industry.

== Career ==
After graduating from Don Bosco Secondary School, Richard studied Visual Communications at Loyola College, Chennai in 1997. He then subsequently began assisting K. V. Anand and worked on Khakee (2004) and Sivaji (2007). He received a nomination from the Vijay Awards for the Best Cinematographer category for his work in his debut venture, Vasanthabalan's Angadi Theru (2010), where he shot on the streets of the crowded Ranganathan Theru in Chennai. During the auditions for the film, he set out with a friend and a borrowed HD camera, spending 24 hours on the street and came back with a video which impressed Vasanthabalan, which made him sign Richard on for the film in 2007. Critics also praised his work describing "his shots were among the highlights" of the film, "with superb night effect shots of Chennai streets". He was subsequently chosen by K. V. Anand to be the cinematographer for Ko (2011), winning acclaim for his shots in Norway and his work in the songs.

He then partnered up with director Thiru for the Vishal starrers Samar (2013) and Naan Sigappu Manithan (2014), filming scenes in Bangkok and getting good reviews from critics. He won further critical acclaim and plaudits for his work in Vanakkam Chennai (2013).

== Filmography ==
=== As cinematographer ===
Year	Film	Notes
2010	Angadi Theru	
2010	Baana Kaathadi	
2011	Ko	
2013	Samar	
2013	Vanakkam Chennai	
2014	Naan Sigappu Manithan	
2014	Vallavanukku Pullum Aayudham	
2015	Trisha Illana Nayanthara	
2016	Appa	
2016	Kaththi Sandai	
2017	Thondan	
2017	Ippadai Vellum	
2018	Kaali	
2018	Mr. Chandramouli	
2018	Thimiru Pudichavan	
2019	Comali	
2021	Maanaadu	
2022	Enna Solla Pogirai	
2022	Paper Rocket	Television series on ZEE5
2022	Gatta Kusthi	
2023	Bommai	
2024	Bachchala Malli	Telugu film
2025	Madha Gaja Raja	
2026	Sattendru Maarudhu Vaanilai	
