= Erumbu =

2023 Indian drama film

- Theatrical release poster
- Directed by: Suresh G
- Written by: Suresh G
- Produced by: Suresh Gunasekaran
- Starring: Charle; M. S. Bhaskar; George Maryan; Monica Siva; Shakthi Rithvik
- Cinematography: K. S. Kalidass
- Edited by: Thiyagarajan M
- Music by: Arun Raj
- Production company: Mandru GVS Production
- Distributed by: Blockbuster Production
- Release date: 16 June 2023
- Country: India
- Language: Tamil

Erumbu (transl. Ant) is a 2023 Indian Tamil-language drama film written, directed, and produced by Suresh G. It stars Charle, M. S. Bhaskar, George Maryan, Monica Siva and Shakthi Rithvik. The music is composed by Arun Raj, and the film released on 16 June 2023.

The film is titled Erumbu because the two kids, Muthu (Rithvik) and Pachamma (Monica), face struggles regardless of their age, which is compared to an ant carrying a weight equal to 20 times its actual weight.

== Plot ==
A young boy, Muthu, loses a one-gram ring and sets out to find it before his family returns home. Throughout the journey, his sister Pachamma and a friend support him.

== Cast ==
- Charle as Annadurai
- M. S. Bhaskar as Arumugam
- George Maryan as Chittu
- Monica Siva as Pachamma
- Shakthi Rithvik as Muthu
- Suzane George as Kamalam
- Paravai Suntharaambaal
- Jagadeeshwaran
- Sumathi G. as groundnut peeling lady
- Tamizh Bharathi

== Production ==
The film was produced by Suresh Gunasekaran under the banner of Mandru GVS Production. The cinematography of the film was done by K. S. Kalidass, and the editing of the film was done by Thiyagarajan M. The film was shot in Kattumannarkoil in 2021.

== Music ==
Erumbu

Soundtrack album by Arun Raj
- Released: 2023
- Genre: Feature film soundtrack
- Length: 7:12
- Language: Tamil
- Label: Saregama
- Producer: Arun Raj

Arun Raj chronology
Kadamaiyai Sei (2022)	Erumbu (2023)	Pizza 3: The Mummy (2023)

The music for the film was composed by Arun Raj, who earlier composed music for Thadam.

Track listing
No.	Title	Lyrics	Singer(s)	Length
1.	"Chikku Bukku Chikku"	Suresh G, Arun Raj	Meghna Sumesh	3:16
2.	"Oru Oorula"	Arun Bharathi	Pradeep Kumar, Arun Raj	3:56
Total length:				7:12

== Release ==
The film was released on 16 June 2023.

== Reception ==
Logesh Balachandran of The Times of India gave the film 3 out of 5 stars and wrote, "Erumbu is a must-watch for anyone who appreciates a simple story with good intentions." Jayabhuvaneshwari B of Cinema Express gave it 2 out of 5 stars and wrote, "The film's story is as predictable as one of your own."

A critic from Vikatan gave the film a mixed review, stating that "the filmmaking style is more like a short film than a feature film." A critic from Maalai Malar gave the film a mixed review, stating that "Erumbu - slow."
