= Annadurai =

Annadurai (Tamil: அண்ணாதுரை) is a Tamil patronymic surname and masculine given name. Notable people with the name include:

- C. N. Annadurai (1909–1969), Indian politician
- Mylswamy Annadurai (born 1958), Indian scientist
- R. Annadurai, Indian politician

== See also ==
- Annadurai, a 2017 action drama film
