= Angadi Theru =

- Theatrical release poster
- Directed by: G. Vasanthabalan
- Written by: G. Vasanthabalan
- Produced by: K. Karunamoorthy; C. Arunpandian
- Starring: Mahesh; Anjali
- Cinematography: Richard M. Nathan
- Edited by: A. Sreekar Prasad
- Music by: Background score: Vijay Antony; Original songs: Vijay Antony; G. V. Prakash Kumar
- Production company: Ayngaran International
- Distributed by: Ayngaran International
- Release date: 26 March 2010
- Running time: 157 minutes
- Country: India
- Language: Tamil

Angadi Theru (transl. Market Street) is a 2010 Indian Tamil-language romantic drama film written and directed by G. Vasanthabalan, starring debutant Mahesh and Anjali. The title refers to the Ranganathan Street in Chennai where the story takes place. The film features music jointly composed by Vijay Antony and G. V. Prakash Kumar. An Ayngaran International production, the film began production in 2008 and released on 26 March 2010 to critical acclaim and box-office success.

== Plot ==
The film starts with Jyothi Lingam and Kani playing with and teasing each other. As they do not have a house, they find a place in the street where masonry workers are sleeping. While they dream, a fire engine loses control after colliding with another vehicle. It hits the people sleeping in the street. Kani and Jyothi are badly injured and are rushed to the hospital.

A flashback opens in a village in Tirunelveli. Jyothi is a bright student and the son of a mason. He leads a happy life in his village near Tirunelveli. One day, tragedy strikes as his father, the only earning member, dies in an accident while crossing an unmanned railway gate, and the young boy now has to look after his mother and two sisters. Jyothi, along with hundreds of others, is employed at the Senthil Murugan Stores run by the big businessman Annachi. On each floor of the textile showroom, there are around 50 to 60 salesmen and women who work in pitiable conditions from early in the morning to late at night, without any rest. Jyothi meets Kani, a fiery, independent girl. The difficult and harrowing times in the store bring them together as they face up to a cruel and lewd store supervisor Karungali, who beats up men and molests women when they play around during duty hours. After some quarrels and arguments, Jyothi and Kani survive in a concentration camp-like condition.

In the meantime, actress Sneha visits the showroom for the shooting of an advertisement. Marimuthu is a die-hard fan of Sneha and is very interested in seeing her; he has collected all her childhood pictures and keeps them with him. Amidst the security, he catches Sneha's attention, meets her, and shows her the album. Sneha is surprised and happy to see the album and tells Marimuthu that she will keep it herself. While Jyothi and Kani talk in the showroom, Karungali comes there. On seeing this, they both hide. Unfortunately, the security guard locks the showroom door without knowing this. Kani shouts at Jyothi, and they do not know what to do. They have to spend the whole night there itself. After some time, they try on the dresses in that room one by one, singing and dancing happily. They spend the night like this, and the next morning they change into their working attire and go to their places as if they had arrived that morning. Unfortunately, the two's dance gets caught on camera as it runs for the shoot with Sneha. Annachi sees this and calls Karungali, who yells at both Jyothi and Kani. Jyothi, in an angry rage, beats up Karungali but is beaten up by him, the police, and other supervisors. Then Karungali files a complaint with the police that Jyothi stole a costly saree from the shop, and the police take Jyothi away. Jyothi tells the inspector that he knows all the fraud activities done by Annachi. So the inspector calls Annachi and advises him to retract the complaint. Otherwise, it will be difficult if Jyothi tells the media all these things. So Jyothi is released from custody.

Jyothi goes to the showroom and threatens Karungali that if they do not release Kani, he will expose these things to the public there. On hearing this, Annachi orders Karungali to send Kani with Jyothi. They both leave the place and search for jobs in all the shops on that street. Finally, a blind elderly person selling clothes on the platform tells Jyothi that he will give them a commission if they help him sell clothes. So they start selling clothes and earn some money for the day. The old man tells them a street where they can safely sleep. They go to that street, and the flashback ends.

The camera now points to the hospital, where Jyothi and Kani are admitted. Jyothi regains consciousness and sees Marimuthu there. Jyothi has slight injuries on his head, legs, and hands. He asks Marimuthu about Kani, but Marimuthu remains silent. So Jyothi gets out of bed, regardless of his injuries, and searches for Kani. He gets shocked to see Kani without her legs, as she had lost them in the accident. Marimuthu advises Jyothi to forget Kani, as she cannot do things on her own and needs someone's help. Many things are running in Jyothi's mind, and he finally decides to marry Kani.

Six months later, Marimuthu has become Sneha's makeup man; Kani is sitting on a platform selling things; and Jyothi is selling things while walking down the street.

== Cast ==
- Mahesh as Jyothi Lingam
- Anjali as Serma Kani
- Sneha as herself (cameo appearance)
- A. Venkatesh as Pavunu alias Karungali
- Pandi as Marimuthu
- John Vijay as Advertisement Director
- Pala. Karuppiah as Annachi
- Imman Annachi as Store Supervisor
- Sindhu as Sex Worker
- Vikramadithyan
- Pazhani Kumar
- Ember Vedha
- Kasi
- Murugaperumal
- Muthuveeran
- Abhirami
- Sukanya
- Kruthika

== Production ==
The film began production in 2008. Vasanthabalan first approached Dhanush for the lead role, but he turned down the offer, saying he was looking to work on more hero-centric films. Prior to Mahesh's selection, Vasanthabalan also considered Irfan for the role.

== Soundtrack ==
Angaadi Theru

Soundtrack album by G. V. Prakash Kumar and Vijay Antony
- Released: 25 October 2009
- Genre: Soundtrack
- Language: Tamil
- Labels: Ayngaran Music; An Ak Audio
- Producers: G. V. Prakash Kumar; Vijay Antony

G. V. Prakash Kumar chronology
Seval (2008)	Angaadi Theru (2009)	Aayirathil Oruvan (2010)

Vijay Antony chronology
Aval Peyar Thamizharasi (2010)	Angaadi Theru (2010)	Kanagavel Kaaka (2010)

The soundtrack album was composed by G. V. Prakash Kumar, while Vijay Antony composed two songs and also scored the background music. Lyrics were penned by Na. Muthukumar.

Track listing
No.	Title	Music	Singer(s)	Length
1.	"Aval Appadi Onrum"	Vijay Antony	Vineeth Sreenivasan, Ranjith, Janaki Iyer
2.	"Kannil Theriyum"	G. V. Prakash Kumar	G. V. Prakash Kumar
3.	"Karungali Naayae"	G. V. Prakash Kumar	Karthik, Mahesh, Pandi
4.	"Kathaigalai Pesum"	G. V. Prakash Kumar	Benny Dayal, Hamsika Iyer
5.	"Unn Perai Sollum"	G. V. Prakash Kumar	Naresh Iyer, Haricharan, Shreya Ghoshal
6.	"Yenge Poveno Enn"	Vijay Antony	Benny Dayal, MK Balaji, Janaki Iyer

== Critical reception ==
Parvathi Srinivasan from Rediff.com described the film as a "kind of cinema you keep hoping for and only rarely get," labeling it "a must watch." Chennai Online gave credit to the theme of the film by stating that, "Vasanthabalan must be applauded for courageously presenting us a film that looks into the darker side of the glittery world of massive show rooms. Bhama Devi Ravi of The Times of India wrote, "The next time you visit a shopping mall, vignettes from the film will pop up, like spam mail, in your memory. A hard, but must-see for those who care about cinema and society".

== Accolades ==
Ceremony	Category	Recipient	Ref.
2010 Chennai International Film Festival	Best Film	K. Karunamoorthy, C. Arunpandian	
2010 Vikatan Awards	Best Actress	Anjali	
2010 Vikatan Awards	Best Story	Vasanthabalan	
Norway Tamil Film Festival	Best Film	K. Karunamoorthy, C. Arunpandian	
Norway Tamil Film Festival	Best Actress	Anjali	
Vijay Awards	Best Film	K. Karunamoorthy, C. Arunpandian	
Vijay Awards	Best Director	Vasanthabalan	
Vijay Awards	Best Actress	Anjali	
Filmfare Awards South	Best Director – Tamil	Vasanthabalan	
Filmfare Awards South	Best Actress – Tamil	Anjali	
Filmfare Awards South	Best Female Playback Singer – Tamil	Shreya Ghoshal	
Tamil Nadu State Film Awards	Special Prize for Best Film	K. Karunamoorthy and C. Arunpandian	
Tamil Nadu State Film Awards	Special Prize for Jury Award for Special Performance	Anjali	
