= Kanagavel Kaaka =

- Directed by: Kavin Bala
- Written by: Kavin Bala
- Produced by: Saravana. R Kishore G. Sha
- Starring: Karan; Haripriya
- Cinematography: Shaji
- Edited by: Suresh Urs
- Music by: Vijay Antony
- Production company: Akarshini Theatres
- Distributed by: Akarshini Theatres
- Release date: 21 May 2010
- Country: India
- Language: Tamil

Kanagavel Kaaka is a 2010 Indian Tamil-language action film written and directed by Kavin Bala. The film stars Karan and Haripriya in the lead roles, while Kota Srinivasa Rao, Adithya Menon, and Sampath Raj play supporting roles. The music was composed by Vijay Antony with cinematography by Shaji and editing by Suresh Urs. The film was released on 21 May 2010.

== Plot ==
Kanagavel works in a court. He comes across various cases, where the rich and influential guilty men escape from the iron-hands of law through money, influence, and power. In disguise, Vel kills them, sending a strong message to everyone who bends the rule of law. In the meantime, a futile attempt by Velu to murder Law Minister Ayyanarappan forces cops to investigate the issue. A series of murders poses problems to them even as Deputy Commissioner of Police Karunakaran is deputed to nab the criminal. There is a flashback which reveals Vel's motives. A few years ago, Vel's father Muthu Rathina Sakthivel, an honest judge, is forced to see his wife and daughter killed by Ayyanarappan, but he escapes the punishment. Vel manages to get the job of 'dawali' and take revenge on him. The climax of the film concerns whether or not he achieved his mission.

== Cast ==
- Karan as Kanagavel (Vel)
- Haripriya as Sandhya
- Kota Srinivasa Rao as Law Minister Ayyanarappan
- Adithya Menon as DCP Karunakaran
- Sampath Raj as Thirunavakarassu
- Avinash as Lawyer Muthu Rathina Sakthivel (Vel's father)
- Sangam Prakash
- Raj Kapoor as Mannadi Narayanan
- Devadarshini as Vel's sister
- Pandu as Inspector Nagarajan
- Vaiyapuri as Karuppu
- Boys Rajan as Sandhya's father
- Singamuthu
- Sabitha Anand
- LIC Narasimhan
- Cool Suresh

== Soundtrack ==
The music was composed by Vijay Antony.

Kanagavel Kaaka

Soundtrack album by Vijay Antony
- Released: 4 February 2010
- Genre: Feature film soundtrack
- Language: Tamil
- Label: Sony Music India
- Producer: Vijay Antony

Vijay Antony chronology
Angadi Theru (2010)	Kanagavel Kaaka (2010)	Uthamaputhiran (2010)

No.	Song	Singers	Lyrics
1	"Tring Tring"	Sangeetha Rajeshwaran	Snehan
2	"Paniyaram Konda"	Anand, Srilekha Parthasarathy	Snehan
3	"Suthugira Bhoomi"	Benny Dayal	Snehan
4	"Indha Kadhal"	Divya Vijay, MK Balaji	Jayantha
5	"Minsarame"	Sangeetha Rajeshwaran, Mahesh Vinayagam	Vijay Antony
6	"Theme Music"	Instrumental	

== Reception ==
Behindwoods wrote "Kanagavel Kaakka has got an interesting subject. But, lack of suspense and intelligence in the proceedings are major drawbacks. A tighter and more focused screenplay was definitely called for". Rediff wrote "Pa Raghavan's peppy dialogues have helped Kavin Bala's efforts at presenting a reasonably-paced adventure, despite the predictable scenes. Some originality would have helped, though". Sify wrote "On the whole there is nothing new in story or treatment, at the same time it is timepass entertainer". Indian Express called it "a fairly engaging one".
