= Kodiyil Oruvan =

2021 film by Ananda Krishnan

- Poster
- Directed by: Ananda Krishnan
- Written by: Ananda Krishnan
- Produced by: T. D. Rajha; D. R. Sanjay Kumar; Kamal Bohra; Lalitha Dhananjayan; Pradeep; Pankaj Bohra
- Starring: Vijay Antony; Aathmika
- Cinematography: N. S. Uthayakumar
- Edited by: Vijay Antony
- Music by: Nivas K. Prasanna
- Production companies: Infiniti Film Ventures; Chendur Film International
- Release date: 17 September 2021
- Running time: 145 minutes
- Country: India
- Language: Tamil

Kodiyil Oruvan (transl. One in a million) is a 2021 Indian Tamil-language political action drama film written and directed by Ananda Krishnan, and produced by Infiniti Film Ventures and Chendur Film International. It stars Vijay Antony and Aathmika. Vijay Antony also edited the film while the music is composed by Nivas K. Prasanna.

Kodiyil Oruvan was released on 17 September 2021, where it received mixed-to-positive reviews and became a commercial success.

== Plot ==
Past: In Kombai, a corrupt politician Sukumar, persuades Arulmozhi to be the panchayat leader, where she gets married and gets the position. However, Arulmozhi's honest and law-abiding principles enrage Sukumar, which leads to him organising a group of hitmen to burn her. The group murders Arulmozhi's husband, pours petrol over the pregnant Arulmozhi, and lights her on fire. However, she falls into the river. She gets severely burned and gives birth to a baby boy, who saves her life. Sukumar gets informed of her survival and her son's birth.

Present: Years later, Arulmozhi's son, Vijayaraghavan, is a caring teacher living in Kombai. Arulmozhi sends him to Chennai to complete IAS and advises him to expand his experience and make her dream come true. Vijayaraghavan lives in the Chennai slums. One day, at an MBA college, a gangster named Sullu kicks him off his desk, and Vijayaraghavan hits his head, where he sees the slum children and decides to reform them. Vijayaraghavan clears his IAS prelims exam and persuades the children's parents to send them to tuition. Vijayaraghavan balances his IAS studies and tuition work, and he has become the favourite tuition master in the area.

Vedhavathi, a classmate of Vijayaraghavan, admires him after hearing his mother's tragic backstory and later falls in love with him. When Gunasekaran, a corrupt councillor, visits the slum, Vijayaraghavan questions him on the false police cases registered against the slum children. In response, Sullu and his gang beat him up, and he motivates his students that they would face obstacles but should ignore them and focus on their goal. Vijayaraghavan clears his IAS exam with motivation from Vedhavathi, where Vijayraghavan plans to go to Delhi for his interview. However, Vijayaraghavan loses his temper and beats up Sullu and his gang, where he also beats up Karuna's men. The next day, Gunasekaran's men kidnap Vijayaraghavan. Karuna beats him up and throws him into the canal.

Vijayaraghavan's students successfully pass their exams, and the people respect and support Vijayaraghavan. In the elections for councillors, Vijayaraghavan runs as an independent candidate, which earns the annoyance of the District Secretary Pedha Perumal. Vijayaraghavan persuades the people to change and wins the election. Gunasekaran and Sullu are annoyed by Vijayaraghavan's victory. Pedha Perumal gets angry at Gunasekaran and Karuna. After overcoming many threats from Gunasekaran and persuading his enemy, Pedha Perumal, Vijayaraghavan solves the pending issues in his ward. Eventually, Vijayaraghavan revamps the slum by painting the houses, laying out new roads and pavements, and giving jobs to the residents, where he also burns Karuna's drugs. The development in the slum pleases the Tamil Nadu Governor, who posts about the changes on his Twitter page.

Gunasekaran complains about the news to Pedha Perumal, and Sullu says he should have beaten up Vijayaraghavan when he had the chance. However, Pedha Perumal insults Sullu and Guna. The Governor visits the ward and tries to convince Vijayaraghavan to join the opposition. Pedha Perumal also visits Vijayaraghavan, but Vijayaraghavan rejects his request. Pedha Perumal forces Vijayaraghavan to resign. Sukumar barges into Arulmozhi's house and breaks her hand when she defies him. He emotionally signs the resignation letter and records a video as proof. After hearing the news of his mother's broken hand from his friends, Vijayraghavan beats Karuna and his goons. Gunasekaran realises he lost the area when the people supported the ex-councillor Vijayaraghavan. Pedha Perumal becomes furious at Karuna.

Vijayaraghavan files for an MLA candidate. Opposition party CM Rajamanickam persuades Vijayaraghavan to make a deal and join their party. Vijayaraghavan says he will join his party unless he receives the state's CM post. Eventually, Vijayaraghavan exacts his revenge against Sukumar, and the police arrest him. Enraged, Rajamanickam tells Pedha Perumal that Vijayaraghavan should not have any powers as CM. He says that Vijayaraghavan should face the problems, and the upcoming events will be presented in the sequel.

== Cast ==
- Vijay Anthony as Vijayaragavan
- Aathmika as Vedhavathi, Vijayaraghavan's love interest
- Ramachandra Raju as Pedha Perumal, District Secretary
- Prabhakar as Conference Karna, a murderous rowdy
- Divya Prabha as Arulmozhi, Vijayaraghavan's mother
- Shankar Krishnamurthy as Election Result updater
- Poo Ramu as Sukumar, a corrupt politician in Kombai
- Sachin Khedekar as Chief Minister of Tamil Nadu and President of Ruling party
- Super Subburayan as Don Gunasekaran, Ex Councillor
- Sooraj Pops as Sullu, a gangster
- Sakthi Saravanan as Minnal Kumar
- Aaditya Kathir as Kamal, Sullu's henchman
- Karuppu Nambiyar as Vijayaraghavan's assistant
- Thidiyan as phone smuggler and Sullu's henchmen
- Durai Ramesh as Purushothaman, water contractor
- Rail Ravi as Vedhavathi's father
- Chandrasekar Koneru as Jail Raid officer

== Production ==
The shooting was wrapped in February 2021.

== Soundtrack ==
The soundtrack and score is composed by Nivas K. Prasanna. The soundtrack album featured five songs and the audio rights were acquired by Saregama.

Kodiyil Oruvan

Soundtrack album by Nivas K. Prasanna
- Released: 2021
- Genre: Feature film soundtrack
- Length: 28:22
- Language: Tamil
- Label: Saregama
- Producer: Nivas K. Prasanna

Nivas K. Prasanna chronology
Hippi (2019)	Kodiyil Oruvan (2021)	Oh My Dog (2022)

No.	Title	Lyrics	{{{extra_column}}}	Length
1.	"Avan Paathu Sirikala"	Mohan Rajan	Malvi Sundaresan	5:29
2.	"Naan Varuven"	Arun Bharathi	Haricharan, Nivas K Prasanna	5:28
3.	"Slum Anthem (Atti)"	Super Subu	Gautham Vasudev Menon, Premji Amaren, Vijay Antony, Nivas K. Prasanna	4:46
4.	"Nee Kaanum Kanave"	Mohan Rajan	Sathyaprakash Dharmar, Abhishek Ravishankar, Vanjula Oppili	4:48
5.	"Sila Naal Karuvil"	Mohan Rajan	Sukanya Varadarajan	4:06
6.	"Kodiyil Oruvan- Theme Song"	Arun Bharathi	Dinesh Kanagaratnam (Rap), Vijay Antony	3:45

== Release ==
The film was released in theatres on 17 September 2021. The film was dubbed and released in Kannada, Telugu and Hindi versions under the title Vijaya Raghavan while the Malayalam dubbed version retained the same title as the original.

=== Home media ===
The streaming rights of the film were acquired by Amazon Prime Video and satellite rights were acquired by Colors Tamil.

== Reception ==
Kodiyil Oruvan received mixed-to-positive reviews from critics.

=== Critical reception ===
Sify gave 3 out of 5 stars and wrote "Kodiyil Oruvan is a mass action entertainer from Vijay Antony on the lines of Pichaikkaran with strong mother sentiment." Suganth of The Times of India gave 3 out on 5 stars and wrote " An uneven masala movie saved by strong amma sentiment." Haricharan Pudipeddi of Hindustan Times wrote, "Director Ananda Krishnan's first big-budget film is a predictable but entertaining political thriller."

Srivatsan S of The Hindu wrote "The Vijay Antony-starrer is loud, mostly boring and has a soft-spoken, kind-hearted hero at the centre, who seemed to have been written not on a white paper, but on tile." Navein Darshan of The New Indian Express wrote "Kodiyil Oruvan is an unabashed commercial entertainer, and no surprise, the hero wins. Making this format click with the audience is quite tricky."
