= Vinod Sagar =

Indian actor and dubbing actor

- Born: Chennai, Tamil Nadu, India
- Occupation: Actor
- Years active: 2012–present

Vinod Sagar is an Indian actor working in Tamil, Malayalam, and Telugu cinema, playing mostly supporting and antagonistic roles. He made his debut with Idhayam Thiraiarangam (2012) and played small roles before getting noticed in Pichaikkaran (2016) and Ratsasan (2018).

== Career ==
Vinod Sagar, a B.A. Corporate secretaryship graduate, has also worked as a radio jockey for Radio Asia, Dubai (2005) and later enrolled with Theatre Lab, a theatre group, before appearing in small roles in films.

Sagar's notable performance came with the psychological thriller Ratsasan (2018), where he played a pedophile. He played the same role in Rakshasudu (2019), its Telugu remake.

Sagar has also done prominent roles in the Tamil film Champion (2019) and the Malayalam films Nayattu (2021) and Jana Gana Mana (2022).

== Filmography ==
=== Tamil films ===
| Year | Title | Role | Notes |
|---|---|---|---|
| 2012 | Idhayam Thiraiarangam | Kumar's coworker | |
| 2012 | Naan | | |
| 2013 | Haridas | | |
| 2014 | Mundasupatti | Mokkaiyan | |
| 2014 | Madras | | |
| 2014 | Kaththi | Shanmugam | |
| 2015 | Patra | | |
| 2015 | Kirumi | | |
| 2015 | Andhadhi | | |
| 2015 | Urumeen | | |
| 2016 | Pichaikkaran | Avinashi's henchman | |
| 2017 | Maanagaram | | |
| 2017 | Gulaebaghavali | | |
| 2018 | Chekka Chivantha Vaanam | | |
| 2018 | Kaala | | |
| 2018 | Ratsasan | Inbaraj | |
| 2019 | Sagaa | Jail Warden | |
| 2019 | Airaa | Kullan | |
| 2019 | Champion | Rajiv Gandhi | |
| 2021 | Methagu | Constable #455 | |
| 2021 | Blood Money | | |
| 2022 | Anbarivu | Doctor Nimmathi | |
| 2022 | Carbon | | |
| 2022 | Ward 126 | | |
| 2022 | Kuruthi Aattam | Karnan | |
| 2022 | Tamil Rockerz | Nelson | |
| 2022 | Cadaver | | |
| 2022 | Laththi | Kaimari | |
| 2023 | Parundhaaguthu Oor Kuruvi | Inspector Dharmaraj | |
| 2023 | Infinity | | |
| 2023 | Red Sandalwood | | |
| 2023 | The Road | Bhaskaran | |
| 2023 | 80s Buildup | Baasha | |
| 2024 | Por | Dean | |
| 2024 | Maharaja | Sabari | |
| 2024 | Bayamariya Brammai | Kabilan | |
| 2024 | Indian 2 | M. I. Kirubakaran | |
| 2024 | Vettaiyan | Politician | |
| 2025 | Maargan | ADGP Natraj Pandian IPS | |
| 2025 | Kumaara Sambavam | | |
| 2025 | Others | Mukesh | |
| 2025 | Thalaivan Thalaivii | Nagappaambu | |
| 2026 | Thiraivi | Security Sampath | |
| 2026 | Blast | Toby | |
| 2026 | Sannidhanam P.O | | |

=== Malayalam films ===
| Year | Title | Role | Notes |
|---|---|---|---|
| 2021 | Nayattu | Moorthi | |
| 2022 | Salute | Murali T. S. | |
| 2022 | Jana Gana Mana | Victor | |
| 2022 | Saudi Vellakka | Magistrate | |
| 2022 | Kakkipada | | |
| 2026 | Uyir | | |

=== Telugu films ===
| Year | Title | Role | Notes |
|---|---|---|---|
| 2019 | Rakshasudu | School Teacher Sobharaj | |
| 2024 | Operation Raavan | | |
| 2026 | Ranabaali | Easwar | |
