= Dheepa Ramanujam =

Indian entrepreneur and actress

- Born: Dheepa; Virudhunagar, Tamil Nadu, India
- Occupations: Actress; Playwright; Director
- Years active: 1997-present
- Spouse: Ramanujam

Dheepa Ramanujam is an Indian entrepreneur and actress who appears in Tamil films.

== Career ==
Dheepa Ramanujam forayed into acting with K. Balachander's television serial Premi, while made her acting debut with a small role in the Rajinikanth-starrer Arunachalam (1997). She worked as an assistant director to Arun Vaidyanathan and Abhishek for Achchamundu! Achchamundu! (2008) and Kathai (2010), respectively. She is popularly known for directing Chillu, a science fiction stage play produced by Sri Thenandal Films in collaboration with Shraddha and Krea, a US-based theatre group. She's also well known for her motherly role in the film Pichaikkaran (2016) directed by Sasi.

Since 2020, Dheepa has also become an entrepreneur and started her own line of denim jeans for Indian women under the brand name of Lotusline.

== Filmography ==
Year	Film	Role	Notes
1997	Arunachalam		Debut
2003	Boys		
2008	Achchamundu! Achchamundu!	Malini's friend	
2015	Uttama Villain	Queen	
2015	Pasanga 2	School's principal	
2016	Rajini Murugan	Murugan's mother	
2016	Pichaikkaran	Bhuvaneshwari	
2016	Idhu Namma Aalu	Mylaa's mother	
2017	Spyder	Shiva's mother	Tamil - Telugu bilingual film
2017	Vimaanam	Venkidi's mother	Malayalam film
2018	Abhiyum Anuvum	Abhi's mother	
2019	Sivappu Manjal Pachai	Rajasekhar's mother	
2019	Adithya Varma	Adithya Varma's mother	
2026	Con City	Saravana's mother	
