= Nambiyaar =

2016 Indian film by Ganeshaa

- Poster
- Directed by: Ganeshaa
- Written by: Ganeshaa
- Produced by: Haresh Vikram Vijayakumar; S. Vandana; S. Shaalini
- Starring: Srikanth; Santhanam; Sunaina
- Cinematography: M. S. Prabhu
- Edited by: Vivek Harshan
- Music by: Vijay Antony
- Production company: Golden Friday Films
- Release date: 19 August 2016
- Country: India
- Language: Tamil

Nambiyaar is a 2016 Tamil-language comedy film written and directed by Ganeshaa in his directorial debut. It stars Srikanth, Santhanam (as the title character) and Sunaina in the lead roles. Produced by Srikanth's production company, Golden Friday Films, and independent producer, Haresh Vikram Vijayakumar (Malaysia), the film is named after the veteran actor M. N. Nambiar, who was famous for his villainous roles in yesteryear Tamil cinema.

Vijay Antony composed the soundtrack and original songs for the film, while M. S. Prabhu handled the cinematography and Vivek Harshan did the editing. Production in early 2013, but the film went through delays before its eventual release in August 2016. This is the last film of Santhanam acting as comedian.

== Plot ==
Ramachandran, an IAS aspirant, keeps getting into difficult situations because of his id, Nambiyaar, who ends up creating havoc in his relationship with his parents and Saroja, the woman he loves .

== Cast ==
- Srikanth as Ramachandran
- Santhanam as Nambiyaar
- Sunaina as Saroja Devi
- Delhi Ganesh as Saroja Devi's father
- Jayaprakash as Ramachandran's father
- Vanitha Krishnachandran as Ramachandran's mother
- John Vijay as Inspector Pandian
- Subbu Panchu as Ramachandran's elder brother
- Devadarshini as Ramachandran's sister-in-law
- Arjunan as Arjun
- Nakshathra Nagesh as Confused Girl
- Cool Suresh
- Arya as Baskar (Special appearance)
- Parvathy Omanakuttan as Dharani (Special appearance)
- Vijay Antony (Special appearance)

== Production ==
Ganesh, a former assistant to directors S. S. Rajamouli and Vikraman, announced plans in February 2013 that he would be making a film named Nambiar and had approached actor-music composer Vijay Antony to play the title role. However, due to his prior commitments, he turned down the lead role and agreed to compose music for the film. Subsequently, Srikanth signed the film and agreed to make it his maiden production venture. Comedy actor Santhanam was approached to play another role sharing the same screen length with the lead actor. Actress Sunaina was signed in to play the female lead role. Srikanth's wife Vandana made her entry as the costume designer of the film. Arya was asked to play an important guest role and shot for the film without demanding a remuneration.

Ganesh called this as his "dream project" and also approached Mohan Nambiar, son of veteran villain actor Nambiar and got formal permission from him before naming the film after the actor. The shoot of the first schedule of the film was happening in Chennai in June 2013. The film's release was delayed for two years, before the makers readied the project for release in August 2016.

== Soundtrack ==
Music was composed by Vijay Antony composing for a Srikanth film for the second time after Rasikkum Seemane. Actor Santhanam made his debut as singer with this film.

Nambiyaar

Soundtrack album by Vijay Antony
- Released: 2 August 2016
- Genre: Feature film soundtrack
- Language: Tamil

Vijay Antony chronology
Pichaikkaran (2016)	Nambiyaar (2016)	Asthitva (2016)

No.	Song	Singers	Lyrics
1	"Aara Amara" I	Santhanam	Viveka
2	"Aara Amara" II	Santhanam	Viveka
3	"Idhuvarai Yaarum"	Rahul Nambiar, Chinmayi	Madhan Karky
4	"Kaima Kaisa"	Naresh Iyer	Viveka
5	"Nambiyaar" (Theme)	Instrumental	
6	"Saroja Devi"	Aalap Raju	Madhan Karky
7	"Thoongum Penne"	Srinivas	Madhan Karky
