= Vanakkam Chennai =

2013 Indian film by Kiruthiga Udhayanidhi

- Theatrical release poster
- Directed by: Kiruthiga Udhayanidhi
- Written by: Kiruthiga Udhayanidhi
- Produced by: Udhayanidhi Stalin
- Starring: Shiva; Priya Anand; Santhanam; Rahul Ravindran
- Cinematography: Richard M. Nathan
- Edited by: T. S. Suresh
- Music by: Anirudh Ravichander
- Production company: Red Giant Movies
- Distributed by: Red Giant Movies
- Release date: 11 October 2013
- Running time: 151 minutes
- Country: India
- Language: Tamil

Vanakkam Chennai (transl. Hello/Greetings Chennai) is a 2013 Indian Tamil-language romantic comedy film written and directed by Kiruthiga Udhayanidhi, in her debut. Produced by her husband Udhayanidhi Stalin under Red Giant Movies, the film stars Shiva and Priya Anand, while Santhanam and Rahul Ravindran portray supporting roles. It revolves around two people who end up renting the same house due to a fraudulent real estate broker, and slowly fall in love.

Filming for Vanakkam Chennai took place between February and July 2013, mostly in Chennai and Munnar. The music is scored by Anirudh Ravichander, cinematography was handled by Richard M. Nathan, and editing by T. S. Suresh. The film was released worldwide on 11 October 2013.

== Plot ==
K. Madasamy alias Ajay, a youth from Theni, comes to Chennai to take up a job. Anjali Rajamohan, a photographer from London, is also in the city to capture South Indian culture on camera. The duo is deceived by Narayanan, a real estate broker who rents out unoccupied houses without informing the house owners. Ajay and Anjali pay the rental money to Narayanan and end up signing the same house. Unable to find another house to rent, the duo decides to stay together till they find Narayanan. They squabble and argue a lot, but soon Ajay falls in love with Anjali. However, he does not reveal to her his feelings. After taking her on a trip to Theni, he realises that she does not reciprocate his feelings, leaving him depressed.

Soon, Ajay tracks down Narayanan, whom he met in a chance encounter earlier, where Ajay pockets Narayanan's address from his wallet, and blames him for the misery in his life, because it was Narayanan's trickery that brought them together and now, Ajay cannot live without her love. Narayanan decides to help Ajay and he visits the house, under the pretense of being Ajay's friend, Billa Senthil. He tries to make Anjali fall for Ajay. Anjali's fiancé, Deepak then gives Anjali a surprise visit, just as when she begins to enjoy Ajay's company. Narayanan continues to try to getting Ajay and Anjali together, with no success.

On the night of Anjali's birthday, Ajay decides that she will never love him, and resorts to drinking, after being depressed. Meanwhile, Anjali realises that she loves Ajay but is angry at his behaviour under the influence of alcohol. The next day, she goes to the wedding of Ajay's colleague as his wife, due to the fact that his colleagues think she is his wife and looks for him there. Just when they find each other and are about to confess their feelings for one another, Narayanan speaks on the phone with some new tenants. When he jokingly offers Ajay a cut of the deal, Anjali misunderstands Ajay as a fraudster who was also in Narayanan's house plot. Anguished, Anjali berates them and leaves the wedding hall, while Ajay looks on in guilt.

Three months later, Anjali has returned to London and wins a photography contest. Deepak tells her that Narayanan had told him everything from scratch, and that Ajay is innocent. He convinces her that she loves Ajay and vice versa, as she did not hesitate to visit Theni or act as Ajay's wife despite being engaged to Deepak. Anjali returns to the Chennai house and looks for Ajay, but does not find him. Just then, Ajay opens the door and finds his passport that he was looking for. Anjali meets him and is initially upset, asking him why he did not come to her for the last three months in London. Ajay tells her that he had just received his passport and was planning to leave for the airport. As the two hug and reconcile, Narayanan, unaware of their presence, enters with a prospective tenant to trick, and takes an advance from him. Ajay and Anjali stop Narayanan and punch him.

== Cast ==
As per the opening credits:

- Shiva as K. Madasamy (Ajay)
- Priya Anand as Anjali Rajamohan
- Santhanam as Narayanan (Billa Senthil)
- Rahul Ravindran as Deepak
- Urvashi as Inspector Chandralekha
- Renuka as Ajay's mother
- Nizhalgal Ravi as Rajamohan
- Manobala as Constable Ayyasamy
- Swaminathan as Ponnurasu
- Crane Manohar as Anjali's uncle
- Black Pandi as Murali
- G. Rajkumar as G. Vasu
- Na. Kumanan as 'Kaaka Valipu' Sankar
- Aarthi as Ponnatha
- Deepa Nambiar as Rosy Aunty
- Meesha Ghoshal as Leena
- Gowri Lakshmi as P. Geetha, Vasu's wife
- Rithi Mangal as Ajay's lover since the fifth grade

Uncredited

- Nassar as Colonel Balasubramaniam
- Udhayanidhi Stalin as a prospective tenant

Anirudh Ravichander, Adhi of Hiphop Tamizha, Hard Kaur and Robert appear in the song "Chennai City Gangsta".

== Production ==
Vanakkam Chennai is the directorial debut of Kiruthiga Udhayanidhi. After she completed the script, she had no intention of directing it and approached other directors, but none accepted. On the encouragement of M. Rajesh, she herself decided to direct. Kiruthiga's husband Udhayanidhi Stalin produced the film and also helped improvise the script. Sunaina was initially to play the lead female role which went to Priya Anand. Cinematography was handled by Richard M. Nathan, and editing by T. S. Suresh. Principal photography began on 1 February 2013 at ECR, Chennai. Although Kiruthiga had contracted chikungunya on the first day of filming, she refused to cancel the shoot for that day. As of May, filming was taking place in Munnar. The film's final schedule began in mid-July 2013 in Chennai, and wrapped later the same month. Responding to criticism that the film was plagiarised from the 1955 film Missamma, Kiruthiga denied them as rumours, saying the story of Vanakkam Chennai was something she developed during her college days. The music video for "Chennai City Gangsta" includes stop motion animation, which was created by Idea Heavens Studio.

== Soundtrack ==
The music is composed by Anirudh Ravichander. He signed on the project in 2012, and described it as a "fun" and "youthful" album that would appeal to urban audiences. The song "Oh Penne" marks the Tamil debut of Bollywood singer Vishal Dadlani. An alternate version of the song was also produced, sung by British Sri Lankan musicians Charles Bosco and Arjun. Assamese singer Papon sang the song "Hey", recorded in late June 2013. The song "Engadi Porandha" was sung by Andrea Jeremiah and Anirudh; their lines were recorded separately as Anirudh was in Mumbai for the album mix when Andrea recorded her vocals. "Chennai City Gangsta", described by Anirudh as a "rave party track", includes vocals by Adhi of Hiphop Tamizha, and Punjabi rapper Hard Kaur. Adhi had earlier collaborated with Anirudh for the title track of Ethir Neechal (2013), and described "Chennai City Gangsta" as a thematic follow-up to that song. There were no rehearsals for the song. It serves as a tribute to the city of Chennai and its culture. The tracklist, featuring only the song names, was unveiled in mid-June 2013. The upgraded tracklist featuring the singer names was released a month later.

The audio rights were purchased by Sony Music India, and the audio was launched on 27 July at Suryan FM. Vipin of Music Aloud summarised "It is indeed a hat-trick of winners in Tamil for Anirudh Ravichander, with Vanakkam Chennai. Must-hear soundtrack!", giving 8.5 out of 10. Karthik of Milliblog wrote "Vanakkam Chennai is an interesting soundtrack, but has Anirudh's past catching up too early in his career". Srinivasa Ramanujam of The Times of India rated the entire album 3.5 out of 5. He appreciated "Hey" for its "groovy" vocals and believed it was "sure to have people dancing thanks to the beats", and also appreciated the rustic tone of "Osaka", deviating from Anirudh's usual westernised and techno songs. He was however critical of "Engadi Porandha", but said both versions of "Oh Penne" make up for it, and also appreciated the "melodious" song "Ailasa" and "high-on-energy" song "Chennai City Gangsta".

Track listing
No.	Title	Lyrics	Singer(s)	Length
1.	"Hey"	Na. Muthukumar	Papon, Maria Roe Vincent	04:33
2.	"Osaka Osaka"	Madhan Karky	Anirudh Ravichander, Pragathi Guruprasad	06:06
3.	"Oh Penne"	Na. Muthukumar	Vishal Dadlani, Anirudh Ravichander, Arjun	04:34
4.	"Chennai City Gangsta"	Hiphop Tamizha	Anirudh Ravichander, Hard Kaur, Hiphop Tamizha, Country Chicken	04:17
5.	"Engadi Porandha"	Vignesh Shivan	Anirudh Ravichander, Andrea Jeremiah	03:23
6.	"Ailasa Ailasa"	Madhan Karky	Anirudh Ravichander, Suchitra	04:04
7.	"Oh Penne" (International)	Arjun	Arjun, Anirudh Ravichander, Charles Bosco, Nayeem	03:29
Total length:				30:26

== Release ==
Vanakkam Chennai was released worldwide on 11 October 2013, in Dolby Atmos. Red Giant Movies, besides producing, also distributed the film. Ahead of release, the film was denied entertainment tax exemption, despite meeting the eligibility criteria. Udhayanidhi subsequently decided to appeal in court, but as of 2016, the film was still not granted the same.

=== Critical reception ===
M Suganth of The Times of India rated the film 3 out of 5, saying it "is slick and enjoyable to an extent but also predictable. In fact, most of the time, it is Anirudh's background score that keeps reminding us that this is a romance as well as a comedy". S Saraswathi of Rediff.com said, "Vanakkam Chennai is a fun-filled, but slow paced romantic film that does not boast of a great or original storyline. But there is simplicity and charm in the characters. And the great music certainly keeps you entertained". Prashanth Reddy of Desimartini said, "Anirudh's music is a huge positive and I can't seem to get a few of the background tunes out of my head. Priya Anand looks utterly gorgeous in every frame. But Vanakkam Chennai is still just an okay-ish Rom-com that is hard to hate. It does very little to reinvigorate a stagnant genre. Also, it should have avoided using Santhanam".

Writing for The Hindu, Baradwaj Rangan said, "Seeing Vanakkam Chennai is to be reminded of how stupidly happy a light-hearted love story can make us feel. Scenes that have no business working — like one involving Holi colours — make us smile, and that's a sign that we are involved with these characters, that we want them to realise, soon, that they need to get on with the business of being with each other", calling it a "low-key bliss-out for the most part". Sify said, "The film has nothing new to offer but is still enjoyable due to its glossy packaging, rich visuals and lots of fun". Malini Mannath of The New Indian Express wrote, "Sweet and warm at places, the film is a monotonous journey on the whole. Offering nothing exciting or novel in either its plot or presentation, it's at best a stepping stone for a debutant maker".

=== Box office ===
Vanakkam Chennai opened at number one at the Chennai box office, which the media attributed to favourable word of mouth. In the same week it earned £7,371 at the United Kingdom box office according to trade analyst Taran Adarsh. The film dropped to number two at the Chennai box office in its second week of release and remained in the same rank a week later, with the film drawing the most footfalls from multiplexes.

== Accolades ==
Event	Category	Nominee(s)	Result	Ref.
61st Filmfare Awards South	Best Music Director – Tamil	Anirudh Ravichander	Nominated	
61st Filmfare Awards South	Best Female Playback Singer – Tamil	Suchitra – ("Ailasa Ailasa")	Nominated	
3rd South Indian International Movie Awards	Best Debutant Director – Tamil	Kiruthiga Udhayanidhi	Nominated	
3rd South Indian International Movie Awards	Best Lyricist – Tamil	Madhan Karky – ("Osaka Osaka")	Nominated	
8th Vijay Awards	Best Art Director	Selva Kumar	Nominated	
