= Kiruthiga Udhayanidhi =

Indian film director

- Kiruthiga Udhayanidhi
- Born: Kiruthiga Ramasamy; 3 July 1978 (age 48); Madras, India
- Education: Loyola College, Chennai
- Occupations: Film director, Film producer, Magazine editor of Inbox 1305 and Executive of Red Giant Movies
- Spouse: Udhayanidhi Stalin (m. 2002)
- Children: 2
- Relatives: Karunanidhi family

Kiruthiga Udhayanidhi (née Ramasamy; born 3 July 1978) is an Indian film director and magazine editor working in Tamil cinema. She is also the wife of Udhayanidhi Stalin, the former deputy chief minister of Tamil Nadu (2024 - 2026).

== Career ==
Kiruthiga is the editor of Inbox 1305, a magazine. She started her career with the directorial debut Vanakkam Chennai. The movie, produced by Udhayanidhi Stalin, starred Shiva and Priya Anand. In February 2017, she directed the music video "Sadhayai Meeri", composed by Santhosh Narayanan, which portrays the pains of transgender people. She later directed Kaali (2018), and made the web series Paper Rocket for Zee5 in 2022. The next was the romantic comedy, Kadhalikka Neramillai, released on 14 January 2025.

== Personal life ==
Kiruthiga married Udhayanidhi Stalin in 2002. The couple have a son named Inban who was born in 2004 and a daughter named Tanmaya was born in 2006. Inban has signed for NEROCA FC football club which plays in the I-League.

== Filmography ==
Year	Film	Notes
2013	Vanakkam Chennai	
2018	Kaali	
2022	Paper Rocket	ZEE5 series
2025	Kadhalikka Neramillai	
