= Maargan =

2025 Indian film by Leo John Paul

- Theatrical release poster
- Directed by: Leo John Paul
- Written by: Leo John Paul
- Produced by: Fatima Vijay Antony
- Starring: Vijay Antony; Ajay Dhishan
- Cinematography: S. Yuva
- Edited by: Leo John Paul
- Music by: Vijay Antony
- Production company: Vijay Antony Film Corporation
- Release date: 27 June 2025
- Running time: 132 minutes
- Country: India
- Language: Tamil

Maargan (transl. one who travels through the air) is a 2025 Indian Tamil-language fantasy crime thriller film written, directed, and edited by Leo John Paul in his directorial debut, starring Vijay Antony and Ajay Dhishan. The film has music composed and produced by Vijay Antony himself under his Vijay Antony Film Corporation banner, while the cinematography is handled by Yuva S.

Maargan was released on 27 June 2025 and opened to predominantly positive reviews from critics, who praised Vijay Antony's acting and screenplay, with criticisms for the film's ending.

== Plot ==
Ramya is killed late at night by an injection of an intravenous chemical substance that turns her body numb and then completely black before death. Noticing similarities to a past case involving the death of former ADGP Dhruv Guvarak's daughter, Priya, Dhruv comes from Mumbai to Chennai to unofficially take over the investigation aided by Inspector Sruthi and constable Kaali. Dhruv begins the investigation from Ramya's boyfriend, Karthik, a photographer who is soon to work on a feature film directed by Rajesh. Dhruv discovers that a chain with a unique pendant gifted by Karthik to Ramya is missing after her murder. Karthik informs Dhruv that the pendant was gifted by a friend, but does not disclose much more information. When checking the surveillance cameras near the crime scene, they spot a young boy jogging in the late hours, but cannot see his face as it is covered by a hoodie.

Meanwhile, Dhruv spots the same design of Ramya's pendant drawn on a dusty car and takes fingerprint samples. The forensic analysis leads to Tamilarivu, who was earlier booked in a drug smuggling case. Tamilarivu, a swimmer with an exceptional ability to hold his breath underwater for extended periods, is apprehended by Dhruv. They hold him in an isolated room, and as time passes, Tamilarivu becomes agitated, drinks surplus water, and begins chanting old hymns written by Kalangi Siddar. He demands the pills he has been consuming and becomes violent before fainting. After receiving first aid, Dhruv begins the inquiry. Tamilarivu reveals that he is taking pills to forget his memories of his ex-lover Ramya (who is different from the Ramya murdered), who ditched him after he refused to leave his sister Akhila behind and go to America along with Ramya to fulfill her desire. Tamilarivu claims to have no connection to the murder of Ramya, the one the police are investigating. Dhruv learns that Tamilarivu has an eidetic memory, which allows him to recall events from a very young age. Tamilarivu attributes his exceptional memory to the holy water from his ancestral temple in Kanjamalai, associated with Kalangi Siddar.

Dhruv pressures Tamilarivu about drawing the pendant of Ramya's chain diagram. To retrieve his memories, Tamilarivu jumps into the water and holds his breath for an extended period, which is extremely risky. After resurfacing, he recalls seeing the pendant's shadow in the water. With Tamilarivu's hint, they retrieve CCTV footage from an aquarium shop owner near the crime scene, which confirms Tamilarivu's innocence in the murder. Dhruv seeks Tamilarivu's help in solving Ramya's murder case, leveraging his exceptional photographic memory. Initially, Tamilarivu is hesitant to co-operate, but Dhruv shares his tragic past, about the murder of his daughter, Priya, like that of Ramya. Earlier, Priya was ragged by a convict named Sadiq, and Dhruv's pursuit of justice was also marred by his poisoning, which left him with severe injuries. Moved by Dhruv's story, Tamilarivu agrees to help. Dhruv arranges for Tamilarivu to safely rewind his memory while holding his breath underwater. Tamilarivu uses his ability to recall a location in Kovilambakkam, a suburban area, and mentions that an owl disturbed his memory, preventing him from seeing the killer's face.

Dhruv and Kaali investigate further, seeking help from sanitary workers and a blind young girl who heard the sound of an owl. They suspect a team of North Indian drug dealers might be involved. Meanwhile, Tamilarivu's sister Akhila goes missing, and he fears the killer might target her in revenge for his co-operation with the police. The next morning, Dr. Shalini, a cosmetologist, is killed. Tamilarivu is relieved that the victim is not his sister and Akhila soon returns home safely. To help further, Tamilarivu takes a risk and holds his breath underwater without safety measures, which leads to him fainting. He is rescued and hospitalised, but recovers quickly and even wins the swimming competition. During his time underwater, Tamilarivu recalls a face, which belongs to Vennila, who might be the next victim. Dhruv and his team rush to safeguard Vennila and catch the murderer. Sruthi has secretly installed a spy camera in Vennila's outfit to monitor the situation. Vennila, a model, had undergone skin colour-lightening treatments to land the lead role in a biopic film about P. V. Sindhu, as per Director Rajesh's suggestion.

However, Rajesh replaces her with Sana Trivedi, the film's producer's daughter, leaving Vennila heartbroken. The new lead actress, Sana, invites Vennila to a party at Mahabalipuram, and Dhruv's team follows her to ensure her safety. Meanwhile, Tamilarivu is surveilling Vennila's house on Dhruv's instructions. Suspecting something amiss, Tamilarivu breaks into the house, only to be injected with a chemical, knocked unconscious, and hidden in a water tub. At the party, Dhruv meets Karthik, who reveals that he discovered Vennila at a pharmacy and introduced her to Rajesh, who was impressed by Vennila's powerful eyes and dark skin tone, promising to cast her in the film. Also, Karthik did not reciprocate Vennila's romantic advances and instead gifted the chain she gave him to his lover Ramya. Karthik also mentions that, on Rajesh's advice, Vennila underwent skin-lightening treatments with Dr. Shalini, who was recently murdered. Dhruv discovers the truth about Vennila's identity and her connection to the murders. Tamilarivu regains consciousness and overpowers the men in Vennila's house, discovering that Vennila is the killer.

Vennila, whose real name is Megha, had killed Priya due to past trauma when her boyfriend, Sadiq, mocked her for her dark skin tone, comparing her unfavourably to Priya. After killing Sadiq, Megha assumed the identity of Vennila and moved to Chennai. When Karthik chose Ramya over her, Vennila killed Ramya, believing Karthik rejected her due to her dark skin tone. Vennila's next target was Sana Trivedi, who had replaced her due to her fairer skin tone. She then killed Dr.Shalini since she mocked her with the advertisement describing about Vennila's skin transformation. After killing her she dumped her and posted ad in social media after injecting her with drug she created. Dhruv intervenes just in time and shoots Vennila, preventing her from harming Sana. Karthik mourns Vennila's death, lamenting that the industry's preference for fair skin ultimately led to her tragic end.

== Cast ==
- Vijay Antony as Mumbai ADGP Dhruv Guvarak IPS
- Ajay Dhishan as Tamilarivu
- P. Samuthirakani as DGP Muthuvel Rajan IPS
- Brigida Saga as Inspector Shruthi Selvaraj
- Mahanadi Shankar as Constable Kaali
- Vinod Sagar as Chennai Police ADGP Natraj Pandian IPS
- Ramachandran Durairaj as Murugavel, Tamilarivu and Akhila's father
- Kumar Natarajan as Dr. Varghese
- Adithya Kathir as a house broker
- Seshvitha Raju as Megha / Vennila
- Deepshikha Chandran as Ramya, Tamilarivu's love interest
- Archana as Akhila, Tamilarivu's sister
- Abhishek Vinod as Rajesh, a film director
- Ajith Koshy as Divakar
- Supergood Subramani as an aquarium shop owner
- Maria Vincent as Sana Trivedi, an actress
- Smeha Manimegalai as Priya, Dhruv's daughter
- Mythili Sathyajith as Dr. Shalini, a cosmetologist
- Gurupharan Karthikeyan as Arul, constable
- Rahul Thatha as the garbage picking man, blind girl's grandfather
- Sumathi as Hostel warden (uncredited)
- "Araathi" Archana Kumaar

== Production ==
After Mazhai Pidikkatha Manithan and Hitler (both 2024), Vijay Antony united with editor Leo John Paul in his directorial debut. The film is produced by Vijay Antony himself and was tentatively titled VAFC12, marking the 12th production under his banner. The murder mystery crime thriller film titled Gagana Maargan (transl. Person who travels through air) was revealed on 16 October 2024. On 23 November 2024, a poster was released featuring Antony's nephew Ajay Dhishan debut. The film also includes P. Samuthirakani, Mahanadi Shankar, Brigida Saga, Vinod Sagar, Deepshikha, Archana, Andhaghaaram Natarajan and others in crucial roles. The film has cinematography handled by Yuva S, art direction by Raja A, editing by Leo John Paul, and music by Vijay Antony himself.

The production got wrapped in early October 2024 before the official announcement was made. During the release date announcement on 14 May 2025, the film was retitled to Maargan for undisclosed reasons.

== Music ==
Maargan

Soundtrack album by Vijay Antony
- Genre: Feature film soundtrack
- Language: Tamil
- Producer: Vijay Antony

Vijay Antony chronology
Madha Gaja Raja (2025)	Maargan (2025)

Singles from Maargan
- 1. "Solliduma" Released: 17 January 2025; 2. "Ulagaye Muzhuvathum Verukkiren" Released: 23 June 2025

The soundtrack and background is scored by Vijay Antony. The first single "Solliduma" released on 17 January 2025. The second single "Ulagaye Muzhuvathum Verukkiren" released on 23 June 2025.

Track listing
No.	Title	Lyrics	Singer(s)	Length
1.	"Solliduma"	Laavardhan	Vijay Antony	4:15
2.	"Ulagaye Muzhuvathum Verukkiren"	Arun Bharathi	Akshara

== Release ==
=== Theatrical ===
Maargan released in theatres on 27 June 2025. Apart from Tamil, the film also released in Malayalam, Kannada, Hindi and Telugu languages.

=== Home media ===
Maargan began streaming on Amazon Prime Video from 25 July 2025 in India and Tentkotta overseas.

== Reception ==
Kirubhakar Purushothaman of News18 gave 3.5/5 stars and wrote "Maargan might not break new ground. It is largely a genre film about a serial killer, retaining all of its tropes. However, it proves that familiar genre tropes, when treated with sincerity and style, can still feel fresh." Abhinav Subramanian of The Times of India gave 3/5 stars and wrote "Director Leo John Paul handled the procedural aspects carefully, and cleverly laid out the breadcrumb trail to the killer's motives. It explores themes of prejudice and trauma with enough weight to make the investigation feel purposeful. Maargan is a competently assembled piece of genre filmmaking." Akshay Kumar of Cinema Express gave 3/5 stars and wrote "Maargan, in a nutshell, is a standout among cop procedurals of recent times. Debutant Leo John Paul, with the help of a tailor-made star cast led by Vijay Antony, has managed to deliver a taut and clever thriller with negligible flaws."

Anusha Sundar of OTTPlay gave 2.5/5 stars and wrote "Maargan really sets it up with its captivating first half, promising interesting aspects to be explored, only to be let down by a hurried and succumbing pre-climax and climax that makes the film a forgettable thriller". Janani K of India Today gave 2/5 stars and wrote "Director Leo John Paul's film blends thriller with supernatural elements. However, the explanation it offers is not convincing enough to buy into the premise.[...] 'Maargan' is a high-concept thriller that could have worked better with better staging." Bhuvanesh Chandar of The Hindu wrote "Maargan could've been any other serial killer investigative thriller, if not for the supernatural aspect that elevates it into something more. [...] Maargan is an amusingly paradoxical representation of what Tamil cinema could do more of with — stars experimenting with genres — as well as what it could do away from."
