= Pichaikkaran =

2016 Indian film by Sasi

- Theatrical release poster
- Directed by: Sasi
- Written by: Sasi
- Story by: Akyes
- Produced by: Fatima Vijay Antony
- Starring: Vijay Antony; Satna Titus; Dheepa Ramanujam
- Cinematography: Prasanna Kumar
- Edited by: Veera Senthil Raj
- Music by: Vijay Antony
- Production company: Vijay Antony Film Corporation
- Distributed by: KR Films; Skylark Entertainment
- Release date: 4 March 2016 (India)
- Running time: 120 minutes
- Country: India
- Language: Tamil
- Box office: est. ₹42.25 crore

Pichaikkaaran (transl. Beggar) is a 2016 Indian Tamil-language action drama film written and directed by Sasi, produced by Fatima Vijay Antony and starring Vijay Antony and Satna Titus, while Bagavathi Perumal, Vazhakku En Muthuraman, and Dheepa Ramanujam play supporting roles. Antony also composed the music for the film. The story is about Arul (Vijay Antony), a billionaire businessman who leads a 48-day long secret life as a beggar as part of a religious offering to save his comatose mother who seems destined to die.

Pichaikkaaran was released on 4 March 2016 to positive reviews from critics and became a blockbuster at the box office. The film was remade in Odia as Baby, in Marathi as Bhikari and in Kannada as Amma I Love You.

== Plot ==
Arul Selvakumar is a rich businessman based in Palladam, Tirupur district. His mother, Bhuvaneshwari, is the person behind the growth of their textile business following her husband's early death. Avinashi is Bhuvaneshwari's brother-in-law, who is money-minded and plans to grab Arul's properties. Arul returns from abroad after graduation and takes charge of all the businesses his mother ran. In the meantime, Bhuvaneshwari has an accident in the factory and falls into a coma. All the efforts taken by Arul for her treatment go in vain. By chance, Arul meets a sage at the hospital where his mother is being treated, who tells him there is a way to save his mother. The sage advises Arul to live a 48-day life of a beggar with two conditions: he shouldn't reveal his real identity, and he shouldn't inform anyone else of this. If he completes it, his mother will have a chance to survive.

With no other way to save his mother, Arul accepts both conditions and informs his friend Rajesh to look after the business until he returns. Arul travels to Chennai, joins other beggars at a temple, and starts begging, where he comes across Magizhini and falls in love with her upon seeing her charitable personality. Arul recalls that he and his mother had initially decided to approach Magizhini for her hand in marriage through a matrimonial site. Magizhini later encounters Arul and starts to like his character, without knowing that he is a beggar. Avinashi realises Arul's absence and tries to take over Arul's business. At a wedding ceremony, Magizhini learns that Arul is a beggar and is angered, thinking Arul has misled her. She still does not avoid him as she is impressed more by his good nature. One day, Magizhini's mother sees Arul's photo on her laptop and recalls that he is a rich businessman, and also she had shared her photos with him through the matrimony website a few months ago.

Magizhini is shocked and tries to meet Arul, where she overhears a conversation between Arul and Rajesh, which makes her realise Arul's life as a beggar is to save his mother, and she is even more impressed by his good nature. Rajesh urges Arul to return, but Arul refuses to come with him. Magizhini decides not to disturb Arul until his life as a beggar is still incomplete. Meanwhile, Arul learns from a beggar (who is pretending to be mentally challenged) that a group of doctors who manage a mental health center uses the patients for their medical experiments. Knowing this, the doctors hire goons to murder Arul, who manages to escape from the goons. On his last day as a beggar, Arul is spotted by Avinashi, who tries to kill him, but accidentally stabs Magizhini, who is then admitted to the hospital.

Arul, who is yet to complete his life as a beggar, is left hopeless as he is unable to pay Magizhini's hospital expenses. His beggar friends give him some money to help him, while the police arrests Avinashi. Arul returns home after 48 days, along with Rajesh, to visit his mother and learns that her health has not improved. Arul holds his mother's hands and prays for her recovery. Suddenly, he feels his mother's hands moving. After six months, Bhuvaneshwari completely recovers, and both Arul and Magizhini get married. In the credits, a beggar begs for money from Arul in front of a temple, but Arul gets busy with a phone call and fails to notice the beggar. Bhuvaneshwari gives alms to the beggar. She tells Arul that a beggar's life is so pathetic and that people should never hurt them, as people like themselves cannot lead a beggar's life even for a single day. This implies that she is unaware of Arul leading a lifestyle of a beggar.

== Cast ==
- Vijay Antony as Arul Selvakumar
- Satna Titus as Magizhini / Magizhini Arul Selvakumar, Arul's wife
- Bagavathi Perumal as Rajesh, Arul's personal secretary
- Vazhakku En Muthuraman as Avinashi, Arul's uncle
- Dheepa Ramanujam as Bhuvaneswari Selvakumar, Arul's mother
- Kala as Magizhini's mother
- Rakshita as Thilagam
- Sandhyababu Eelwar as Muttai
- Tharshan as Half Boil
- Karthi as Omelet
- Balakrishnan as NGO Manager
- Janaki Amma as Sun Paati
- Lalitha as Valantha
- Thalayan as Traffic police
- Suresh as Inspector
- Gunasekhar as a Hospital Manager
- Thamizh Puli as Catering Supervisor
- Mohan Raman as Audi Car Owner
- Moorthy as Beggar
- Vinod Sagar as Avinashi's henchman

== Production ==
Sasi began the production of Pichaikkaran in October 2014, and signed on Vijay Antony to feature in the lead role. The pair had earlier worked together in Dishyum (2006), in which Vijay Antony had composed the film's music. The team shot a schedule in Pollachi near Everwin Spinning Mills near Achipatty village in January 2015, before moving to Puducherry by June 2015.

== Soundtrack ==
Pichaikkaran

Soundtrack album to Pichaikkaran by Vijay Antony
- Released: 4 March 2016
- Recorded: 2016
- Genre: Feature film soundtrack
- Language: Tamil
- Labels: Vijay Antony Music; Divo
- Producer: Vijay Antony

Vijay Antony chronology
Aavi Kumar (2015)	Pichaikkaran (2016)	Nambiar (2016)

The film's soundtrack album and background score were composed by Vijay Antony in his second collaboration with Sasi after Dishyum. The soundtrack album consists of seven tracks. The album was released on 7 January 2016. Behindwoods rated the album 2.25 out of 5 and noted that "Overall a pretty decent album but it does have a couple of thumping numbers!".

No.	Song	Singers	Lyrics	Length (m:ss)
1	"Glamour Song"	Velmurugan	Logan	4:10
2	"Nenjorathil" (Female)	Supriya Joshi	Annamalai	4:13
3	"Nooru Samigal"	Vijay Antony	Eknaath	2:44
4	"Unakkaga Varuven"	Janaki Iyer	Priyan	3:39
5	"Oru Vellai Sotrukkaga"	Yazin Nizar	Annamalai	3:31
6	"Nenjorathil" (Male)	Deepak Doddera	Annamalai	4:13
7	"Pichaikkaran" (Theme Music)	Ananthu	Vijay Antony	1:07

Telugu

No.	Song	Singers	Length (m:ss)
1	"Glamour Song"	Prabhu	4:10
2	"Tingarabuchi" (Female)	Supriya Joshi	4:13
3	"Vandha Devulle"	Vijay Antony	2:44
4	"Neekosam Vastha"	Janaki Iyer	3:39
5	"Okka Putta Annam"	Yazin Nizar	3:31
6	"Bichagadu" (Theme Music)	Ananthu	1:07

== Reception ==
=== Critical reception ===
Rediff wrote, "Sasi's Pichaikkaran may have overdosed on action and sentiment but the director manages to portray life from the other side. The humiliation and pain of people we meet and choose to ignore on a daily basis stays with you". Hindustan Times wrote, "One of the biggest drawbacks of many Indian movies is its lethargic attitude towards perfecting a script – not drawing the line from one point to another with any fair degree of conviction. Pichaikkaran thus ends up as a beggar begging for credibility".

Moviecrow wrote "This Pichaikkaran is neither poor to beg nor rich to offer". Behindwoods gave 3.25 out of 5 and wrote "Excessive exaggerations and lack of depth in the dealing make Pichaikkaran not an easy affair". Indiaglitz gave 3.8 out of 5 stars and wrote "[It] makes the right impact as a wholesome entertainer with emotional scenes as his strong base". Baradwaj Rangan of The Hindu wrote "A not-bad drama marred by generic writing" in his review

== Box office ==
The movie brought in ₹16 crore in Tamil Nadu and ₹26.5 crore from the states of Andhra Pradesh and Telangana (under the title Bichagadu) which declared the film as blockbuster, which makes the worldwide gross collection almost ₹42.5 crore.

== Controversy ==
In January 2016, Pichaikkaran faced criticism from the medical community over a controversial song lyric. The lyric implied that doctors from SC/ST and backward communities, who had gained medical seats through the quota system, were prioritizing money over patient care. This sparked outrage, particularly among medical professionals, who viewed the line as offensive and discriminatory. Several doctors demanded the removal of the lyric, which they felt misrepresented and insulted their profession. In response to the protests, the filmmakers agreed to alter the offending line to avoid further conflict and ensure the film's smooth release.

== Sequel ==
A standalone sequel titled Pichaikkaran 2 was announced on 24 July 2020, and it was released on 19 May 2023.
