= Mazhai Pidikkatha Manithan =

2024 Indian action drama film

- Theatrical release poster
- Directed by: S. D. Vijay Milton
- Written by: S. D. Vijay Milton
- Based on: Characters by Jeeva Shankar and N. V. Nirmal Kumar (Note: Although the film is not officially a sequel to Salim, S. D. Vijay Milton reused two character names from that film and its prequel.)
- Produced by: Kamal Bohra; D. Lalithaa; B. Pradeep; Pankaj Bohra
- Starring: Vijay Antony; Sathyaraj; R. Sarathkumar; Megha Akash
- Cinematography: S. D. Vijay Milton
- Edited by: Praveen K. L.
- Music by: Achu Rajamani; Vijay Antony; Roy; Hari Dafusia; Vagu Mazan
- Production company: Infiniti Film Ventures
- Release date: 2 August 2024
- Running time: 133 minutes
- Country: India
- Language: Tamil

Mazhai Pidikkatha Manithan (transl. The man who hates rain) is a 2024 Indian Tamil-language action drama film directed by S. D. Vijay Milton and produced by Infiniti Film Ventures. The film stars Vijay Antony, alongside Sathyaraj, R. Sarathkumar Megha Akash, Dhananjaya, Murali Sharma, Saranya Ponvannan, Pruthvi Ambaar and Thalaivasal Vijay. It was reported to be a sequel to Salim, but Antony denied the reports.

Mazhai Pidikkatha Manithan was released on 2 August 2024 to negative reviews from critics.

== Plot ==
When Law Minister Thavapunniyam discovers "Code 2223" aka Antony in the secret Indian force as the present Salim, he orchestrates a fire accident in which Salim's fiancée and the commander's sister, Diya along with Salim's friends are killed. Salim's commander rescues him, stages his death, and secretly sends him to a remote village in the Andaman Islands to lead a quiet, invisible life. Traumatized, Salim refrains from speaking and develops a hatred of rain. He rescues a hurt beagle puppy named Hitler and nurses it back to health. Parameshwaran "Burma", who co-owns Rathnam Atho Shop with his mother, befriends Salim when they once work under Daali, a ruthless loan shark. DSP Surla, a corrupt officer, publicly humiliates Daali at a toll plaza, awaiting an opportunity to arrest Daali. Daali threatens Raghavan, Sowmya's father to repay his friend's loan, forcing him to consume poison to retrieve the money. Meanwhile, Sowmya files a complaint against Daali at Surla's police station.

In Chennai, Thavapunniyam tracks down Salim's former commander, now a horse ranch owner, and confronts him about Salim but he doesn't reveal the whereabouts. Burma, who has one-sided feelings for Sowmya, takes Salim to her house, where she recognizes him as the one who rescued her dog where Salim gives Burma's unsigned love letter to her. The next morning, Burma's hotel is attacked by Daali's men, who kidnap him for using Daali's name to escape DSP Surla, where the incident went viral on social media, ridiculing Daali. To seek revenge, Daali orders Burma to publicly slap Surla to reinstill fear among the police and the public. Burma confides in Salim, who later finds Hitler wounded again. The veterinarian reveals that the dog was intentionally harmed and upon reaching Sowmya's house, he finds her and her sister brutally attacked. At the hospital, Sowmya confronts Surla, accusing him of inaction despite her complaint, and claims that her father's scooter, which he rode to meet Daali, is being used by Daali's men, and suspects foul play in her father's death.

Salim retaliates against Daali's men and kidnaps six among them, for harming his friend Burma, Sowmya, as well as the puppy Hitler. Salim intervenes in Daali's planned attack on Surla, by hanging one of Daali's henchmen along with five other mannequins from the mall terrace, which further humiliates both Daali and DSP Surla, who vows to find the perpetrator. Salim sends Hitler and the photos of the beaten henchmen to Sowmya, bringing her joy. Meanwhile, the captain inquires about the whereabouts of "2223" aka Antony, and the chief responds that he is presumed dead. However, when the captain suspects Antony might be alive in the Andaman, the chief rushes to Salim to alert him and avoid emotional attachments. Sowmya asks Salim to retrieve her scooter from Daali, which he does before Burma can but hasn't handed it over to Sowmya yet. Sowmya meets Salim and Burma, thanking Salim for making them feel secure, and inquires if Salim has ever felt love for her, to which he remains silent, while Sowmya too understands his silence. Burma assumes Sowmya has reciprocated his feelings, while Burma's mother realises that Salim has sacrificed his love for the sake of her son. The captain contacts the chief again, inquiring about his visit to Andaman and emphasizing that "2223" must be killed to maintain the legitimacy of their previous missions. The chief sets out to Andaman to assassinate Salim.

Meanwhile, Daali's gang interrogates Burma to find the person responsible for killing his men. The police trace Sowmya's scooter while Salim takes a food delivery job, which he had previously rejected, and uses it as an opportunity to park the vehicle at Daali's house. Burma suspects Salim, knowing that he had taken the scooter the previous night. Understanding it to be a trap, Daali orders Burma to return the scooter to Sowmya's house but is caught by Surla. Daali's men, with the veterinarian's prescription, track down Salim and find his watch, which he had left as payment for the medicine. Salim planning to leave Andaman visits the veterinarian to retrieve his watch and escapes from Daali's men but lands in another group of henchmen hired by Surla, who are proceeding to attack Burma at his shop. There Salim reveals himself as the one who attacked Daali's goons and proceeds to fight off the henchmen. Daali tracks Salim through Raghavan and beats Salim in front of Sowmya. DSP Surla arrives and agrees, that Daali will kill Salim, while the police secretly plan to arrest Daali for murder. Burma rescues Salim and lands him on a ferry, but Burma and his mother are caught by Daali's goons. Salim returns to save them and engages in a physical fight with Daali, overpowering him.

Salim confronts Daali about his relentless pursuit of revenge and reveals that Daali was not only humiliated but also was a hero to many as he was to a young girl whose father had borrowed from him. Salim releases the five men he had attacked earlier and questions Daali if he has an heir to enjoy his wealth. Daali, filled with regret, attempts to drink poisoned coffee but finds it is not poisoned. Meanwhile, the chief, following the captain's instructions, shoots Salim with a Remington M24 sniper. A reformed Daali, his goons, Burma, Sowmya, and others mourn Salim's death as his body is taken away on the ferry. The news reaches the minister, who refuses to believe Salim is dead, and affirms that it's just a rumour. The captain over the phone call with the chief reveals that Salim's injury is just a gunshot wound, leaving room for a potential sequel.

== Cast ==
- Vijay Antony as Salim/2223/Antony
- R. Sarathkumar as Chief
- Sathyaraj as Captain Prabhakaran "Captain"
- Dhananjaya as Daali
- Megha Akash as Sowmya
- Murali Sharma as DSP M. S. Surla IPS (Note: While he is introduced as M. S. Surla, his nameplate reads "S. M. Surla".)
- Saranya Ponvannan as Rathnam, Burma’s mother
- Pruthvi Ambaar as Parameshwaran "Burma"
- Thalaivasal Vijay as Raghavan, Sowmya's father
- A. L. Alagappan as Minister Thavapunniyam
- Ramana as Daali's uncle
- Praniti as Sowmya's sister
- Ritika Singh as herself in a cameo appearance
- Raghuvaran as Rathnam's husband (photo presence only)
- Soundarya as Sowmya's mother (photo presence only)
- Bhavana as Diya, Chief's sister (photo presence only)

== Production ==
=== Development and casting ===
In June 2019, after the success of the film Kolaigaran (2019), producer G. Dhananjayan announced that he is collaborating with Infiniti Film Ventures to produce a film with the actor Vijay Antony, mentioning that Vijay Milton will be the director of the project. Kamal Bohra, D. Lalithaa, B. Pradeep, and Pankaj Bohra bankrolled this venture under the banner Infiniti Film Ventures. Initially, Hansika Motwani and Sri Divya were considered to play the female lead in the film before confirming that Megha Akash was going to be the female lead of this film. Allu Sirish was set to work in the film in April 2019 but later was not cast.

=== Filming ===
The filming began around August 2021 after Vijay Milton finished his work for his Kannada directorial debut film Bairagee. In November 2021, it was confirmed that R. Sarathkumar is portraying an important role in this film. The crew finished filming the portions of Sarathkumar on 14 December 2021. A few portions of the film were shot in Goa. Major portions of this film were shot in Daman and Diu, and the Daman-Diu schedule was wrapped up on 3 March 2022. In December 2021, the crew announced that Vijayakanth is also to be cast in the film, portraying an important role. The portions involving Vijayakanth were supposed to be filmed in around March 2022, but the actor's health condition made it impossible to include him in the film. The dubbing work began on March 14 with a puja, including crew members. The filming was completed on 16 June 2022. In July 2022, actor Nakkhul was initially considered to dub for the Kannada actor Pruthvi Ambaar.

== Soundtrack ==
The soundtrack of the film was composed by Vijay Antony, Roy, Hari Dafusia, Vagu Mazan and Achu Rajamani.

Mazhai Pidikkatha Manithan

Soundtrack album by Vijay Antony, Roy, Hari Dafusia, Vagu Mazan, Achu Rajamani
- Released: 5 July 2024
- Genre: Feature film soundtrack
- Length: 20:43
- Language: Tamil
- Label: TrendMusic
- Producer: Vijay Antony, Roy, Hari Dafusia, Vagu Mazan, Achu Rajamani
External audio
- Mazhai Pidikkatha Manithan – Jukebox on YouTube

Track listing
No.	Title	Lyrics	Music	Singer(s)	Length
1.	"Theera Mazhai"	Vandana Mazan	Roy	Roy	3:53
2.	"Thediye Poren"	Muthamil	Hari Dafusia	Jyotsna Radhakrishnan	4:10
3.	"Ivan Yaaro"	Vadivarasu	Vijay Antony	Vijay Antony	4:27
4.	"Aham Brahmasmi"	Achu Rajamani	Achu Rajamani	Achu Rajamani	4:48
5.	"Dhinamum Kaanum"	Vandana Mazan	Vagu Mazan	Vijay Antony, Vagu Mazan	3:25
Total length:					20:43

== Release ==
The film was released theatrically on 2 August 2024.

=== Controversy ===
On the release day of the film, after watching the film in critic screening, Vijay Milton alleged that a one-minute prologue scene had been added to the film without his permission. He said that the original censored version has no such prologue scene and expressed his disbelief that someone from the crew included the scene without informing him, adding that it will spoil the suspense of the character arc. Vijay Milton requested audiences to watch the film without remembering the prologue scene. The film underwent a revision, removing the prologue scene effective 5 August 2024.

=== Home media ===
The digital streaming rights to the film were acquired by Amazon Prime Video.

== Reception ==
Roopa Radhakrishnan of The Times of India gave it 2.5/5 and wrote, "a film that fell into the trap of trying to be a testosterone-filled crowd thriller. Even the meta references in the film fail to make an impact and seem to just be included for the claps." Avinash Ramachandran of The Indian Express rated the film 1.5/5 and wrote that "They often say third time’s the charm, but in the case of Mazhai Pidikatha Manithan, the third instalment in the Salim franchise is no charm but just a lot of harm due to the possibility of a fourth. Now that is a big problem, but then again, it isn’t that bad a thing, right?"

Latha Srinivasan of Hindustan Times gave the film a negative review and wrote, "Mazhai Pidikatha Manithan is a lacklustre film that doesn’t have much going for it. The film moves at a good pace thanks to parallel tracks but sadly, there is no cohesive strong, story to talk about." Janani K of India Today rated the film 1.5/5 and wrote that "Mazhai Pidikatha Manithan is yet another bad film in Vijay Antony and Vijay Milton's filmography."

Anusha Sundar of OTTplay gave it 1.5/5 and wrote, "While the screenplay is fast-apced, the lack of character depth and unreal character arcs may leave you wanting more." Prashanth Vallavan of Cinema Express gave the film a negative review and wrote, "Bizarre directorial choices make this film a chaotic mess".

Gopinath Rajendran of The Hindu wrote, "Mazhai Pidikkatha Manithan is a painfully predictable plot riddled with uninteresting characters stuck in unsurprising happenings". A critic from Maalai Malar rated the film 2/5.
