= Annadurai (film) =

2017 Indian film by G. Srinivasan

- Theatrical Release Poster
- Directed by: G. Srinivasan
- Written by: G. Srinivasan
- Produced by: Fatima Vijay Antony; Radhika
- Starring: Vijay Antony; Diana Champika; Mahima; Jewel Mary
- Cinematography: K. Dhillraj
- Edited by: Vijay Antony; Sreyes KS
- Music by: Vijay Antony
- Production companies: R Studios; Vijay Antony Film Corporation
- Release date: 30 November 2017
- Country: India
- Language: Tamil

Annadurai is a 2017 Indian Tamil-language action drama film written and directed by G. Srinivasan. The film stars Vijay Antony in a dual role as identical twin brothers along with Diana Champika, Mahima, Jewel Mary, Vijaya Rangaraju (karuppaia) while Radha Ravi and Kaali Venkat play supporting roles. Vijay Antony also composed music for the film and also served as the film editor for the first time in his career. Produced by Fatima Vijay Antony and Radhika, the film began production during February 2017 and was released on 30 November 2017.

== Plot ==
An innocent girl, Eswari, takes a share cab home, but a few thugs enter the vehicle, kidnap her, and attempt to rape her at a cemetery. A drunk Annadurai was lying on a grave. He sees the goons trying to rape Eswari. He fights the goons himself, helps the girl by getting a sari, and drives her home safely. She is grateful for his help and respects him.

Annadurai, a good-hearted man, becomes a drunkard after his lover Esther's death, which his friend Karunas reveals to Eswari. He earns the wrath of his family, except for his mother. A girl, Chitra, falls in love with Annadurai's good nature. His lookalike brother, Thambidurai, is a good-natured person who works as a PT master in a school. Thambidurai and his cousin, Revathi, eventually fall in love, and their relatives plan their wedding. After Annadurai gets a loan for Karunas from a ruthless moneylender, Dhayalan, Karunas lands in trouble, so Annadurai shaves his beard to look like Thambidurai. Dhayalan beats him after realizing he is Annadurai after seeing the 'Esther' tattoo on his arm. After family complications, Annadurai becomes upset. His uncle tells Annadurai that he should reform for his mother. Chitra meets Annadurai and confesses her love. He decides to drink for one more day. At a bar, Annadurai is fully drunk and enters into a quarrel with the bar owner and accidentally kills him. Annadurai is arrested and sentenced to seven years' imprisonment.

After seven years, Annadurai is released from jail and is shocked to see Thambidurai as a don. Annadurai is also not accepted by his parents. Karunas reveals what happened after Annadurai went to jail. Thambidurai loses his job due to Annadurai's bad image in the town. Also, Dhayalan cheats on Thambidurai's father and takes away their textile showroom. The deceased bar owner's brother tries to kill Thambidurai, and he fights them. Out of fear for Thambidurai's life, Revathi's father cancels the alliance. Angered, Thambidurai attacks Dhayalan, breaking his leg. In retribution for beating up his henchman Dhayalan, Karuppiah, a corrupt counsellor, beats up Thambidurai. Thambidurai thinks no one respects truthfulness in society, so he joins Karuppiah as his henchman, to his family's shock. Karuppiah is the benami for MLA Mahalingam. Thambidurai transforms into a powerful don in the town.

Annadurai threatened Dhayalan to return their property, which Dhayalan took over by illegal means. Dhayalan fears and agrees. Annadurai gets back the property document and transfers his share to the wife of the deceased bar owner (whom Annadurai killed). The brother rushes to kill Annadurai, but after seeing Annadurai's gesture, he drops his aruval and veshti and respects him.

After a group of students witnesses the murder of a goon that Karuppiah commits, Karuppiah tells Thambidurai to kill the students since they are witnesses. Thambidurai tells Karuppiah not to kill them out of good nature. Instead, Thambidurai pours petrol on Karuppiah. Mahalingam insults Annadurai out of anger for Thambidurai. Eventually, Thambidurai kills Karuppiah after the latter's henchman tries to kill Thambidurai. Thambidurai decides to surrender to the police. However, Mahalingam plans to kill Thambidurai. He falsely accuses Thambidurai of the murder of Inspector Varadhan, and the DSP issues an encounter order against Thambidurai.

Annadurai sets the stage to save his brother. He kills Mahalingam and kidnaps Thambidurai. Annadurai disguises himself as Thambidurai and informs the police about his whereabouts. Eswari sees a video released by Thambidurai, and she sees the 'Esther' tattoo on his arm and realises it is Annadurai. She travels to his location alone. Annadurai begs Eswari to let the police kill him for the sake and happiness of his family and Thambidurai. Police rush to the place and shoot Annadurai, believing him to be Thambidurai, and Annadurai dies from his injuries. Thambidurai understands Annadurai's love for him and his family. Thambidurai performs his funeral rites with Annadurai's family, Revathi, and her father, with Eswari watching. Annadurai's mother cries because she does not understand her son's affection towards them. Finally, Thambidurai is married to Revathi.

== Cast ==
- Vijay Antony in a dual role as
  - Annadurai, Thambidurai's twin brother
  - Thambidurai, Annadurai's twin brother
- Diana Champika as Revathi
- Su.Senthil Kumaran as Revathi's father
- Mahima as Eswari
- Jewel Mary as Chitra
- Vijaya Rangaraju as Karuppaia
- Radha Ravi as MLA Mahalingam
- Kaali Venkat as Karunas
- Cheranraj as Dhayalan
- Nalinikanth as Annadurai and Thambidurai's father
- Rindu Ravi as Annadurai and Thambidurai's mother
- David Solomon Raja as Sub-Inspector Varadhan

== Production ==
In February 2017, Vijay Antony announced that he would act in a film titled Annadurai by newcomer G. Srinivasan for the production house of Radhika. It was later revealed that the film had no connection to the Tamil politician C. N. Annadurai, and that the title was merely used to garner attention amongst audiences. Srinivasan revealed that Vijay Antony would portray twin brothers, Annadurai and Thambidurai, and the story would narrate events between 2010 and 2017. Apart from acting and working as a co-producer alongside his wife Fatima, Vijay Antony also accepted to compose the film's music and work as the film's editor for the first time in his career. The makers signed on three new actresses Diana Champika, Telugu actress Mahima and Malayalam actress Jewel Mary to portray leading female roles, while Kaali Venkat and Radha Ravi were also cast. Cinematography was done by K.Dillraj, who previously taking charge of cinematographer in Thagaraaru film.

In April 2017, Radhika Sarathkumar's properties were put under watch for tax evasion, meaning that Vijay Antony chose to prioritise his work for Kiruthiga Udhayanidhi's Kaali, which he also produced, and the film was briefly put on hold. He later continued to shoot for both films simultaneously. The film was completely shot in Tirukoilur in Tamil Nadu, the hometown of the director.

In September 2017, the makers brought in renowned Telugu actor Chiranjeevi to launch the title of Telugu version of the film, who revealed the title as Indrasena. Chiranjeevi agreed to promote the film owing to his close friendship with actress Radhika.

== Release ==
The satellite rights of the film were sold to Sun TV.

== Soundtrack ==
The soundtrack was composed by Vijay Antony with lyrics written by Arun Bharathi. The audio was released under labels Vijay Antony Music and Divo.

Annadurai

Soundtrack album by Vijay Antony
- Released: 2017
- Genre: Feature film soundtrack
- Labels: Vijay Antony Music; Divo

Vijay Antony chronology
Yaman (2017)	Annadurai (2017)	Kaali (2018)

No.	Song	Singers	Lyrics
1	"Thangama Vairama"	Ananthu, Karthik, Vijay Antony	Arun Bharathi
2	"GST Ya Maari"	Santhosh Hariharan, Supriya Joshi	Arun Bharathi
3	"Odathey"	Ananthu	Arun Bharathi
4	"Odathey" (Pathos)	Ananthu	Arun Bharathi
5	"Annadurai Theme"	Ananthu	Arun Bharathi

== Critical reception ==
The film received mixed reviews from critics. The Indian Express called Annadurai "gigantic misstep" in Vijay Antony's career and "seems like a massive error of judgment to have played a dual role in the tedious film that leads us to the obvious conclusion that we have known all along". Behindwoods wrote, "Overall, Annadurai has a few scenes that could entertain the audience, but as a complete package, it is a little too filmy and over the top."

In regards, Hindustan Times gave a positive review citing "Despite falling into a very familiar territory of sentiment and drama, Annadurai is a family-friendly film and the credit goes to debutant director Srinivasan, who makes it a cut above most films in this space."
