= Iruvar Ullam (2021 film) =

2021 Indian film

- Film poster
- Directed by: G. Ramesh
- Produced by: L. Sivabalan
- Starring: Vinay Rai; Payal Rajput; Archanna Guptaa
- Cinematography: S. S. Murthy
- Edited by: V. T. Vijayan
- Music by: Vijay Antony
- Production company: Zero Rules Entertainment
- Release date: 16 September 2021
- Running time: 119 minutes
- Country: India
- Language: Tamil

Iruvar Ullam (transl. Two Hearts) is a 2021 Indian Tamil-language family drama film directed by G. Ramesh and starring Vinay Rai, Payal Rajput and Archanna Guptaa. Having been shot on 21 June 2013, it was released on streaming platforms during 16 September 2021.

== Plot ==
The film narrates the tale of an IT professional settled in US, who is married to an Indian girl. After marriage, the pair live a happy life but things change when his ex-fiancé reappears.

== Cast ==
- Vinay Rai as Karthik Natarajan
- Payal Rajput as Parvathy
- Archanna Guptaa as Sambhavi
- Jayaprakash as Parvathy's father
- Sathyan
- M. S. Bhaskar as Karthik's uncle
- VTV Ganesh as Kuralarasan (Mams)
- Meera Krishnan as Karthik's mother
- Rishi as Suresh
- Singapore Durairaj as Durairaj
- Sriram as Seetharam Kesari
- Uma as Sambhavi's mother
- Subhalekha Sudhakar as Sambhavi's father
- Rajyalakshmi
- Singamuthu
- Senthi Kumari
- Ravi Prakash

== Production ==
The film was shot in 2012, with Vinay Rai working on the film alongside his commitments for Aranmanai (2014), Serndhu Polama (2015) and Aayirathil Iruvar (2017). Bindu Madhavi signed the project during June 2012 and was set to portray a NRI girl based in the US, but later dropped out of the project. Aindrita Ray was also approached but subsequently actresses Payal Rajput and Archanna Guptaa were cast in their first Tamil film through the project. The film, produced by L. Sivabalan of Zero Rules Entertainment, had music composed by Vijay Antony, and was shot in India and the US.

Despite completing production in 2013, the film remained unreleased. Ramesh later worked on two more films - Kallattam (2016) and Adavi (2020) - which released before Iruvar Ullam.

== Soundtrack ==
The soundtrack, composed by Vijay Antony, was released on 2 June 2013.

Iruvar Ullam

Soundtrack album by Vijay Antony
- Released: 2 June 2013
- Recorded: 2013
- Genre: Feature film soundtrack
- Label: New Movie Plex
- Producer: Vijay Antony

Vijay Antony chronology
Thimiru Pudichavan (2018)	Iruvar Ullam (2013)	Pichaikkaran 2 (2023)

Song	Singers	Lyrics
"Kannadi Silaye"	Santhosh Hariharan, Sangeetha Rajeshwaran	Annamalai
"Kadhal Kiliye"	Haricharan	Na. Muthukumar
"Mazhaiye"	Andrea Jeremiah	Na. Muthukumar
"Udalgal Irandum"	M. M. Manasi, Nivas	Viveka
"Aadum Nenje"	Sunitha Sarathy	Viveka

== Release ==
Following several years of delays, the film was released on Amazon Prime outside India on 16 September 2021.
