= Iraivan =

2023 Tamil-language film by I. Ahmed

- Theatrical release poster
- Directed by: I. Ahmed
- Written by: I. Ahmed
- Produced by: Sudhan Sundaram Jayaram
- Starring: Ravi Mohan; Nayanthara; Narain; Vinoth Kishan; Rahul Bose
- Cinematography: Hari K. Vedantam
- Edited by: J. V. Manikanda Balaji
- Music by: Yuvan Shankar Raja
- Production company: Passion Studios
- Distributed by: Red Giant Movies; Think Studios; S Picture
- Release date: 28 September 2023
- Running time: 152 minutes
- Country: India
- Language: Tamil

Iraivan (transl. God) is a 2023 Tamil-language psychological action thriller film directed by I. Ahmed and produced by Sudhan Sundaram and G. Jayaram under Passion Studios. The film stars Ravi Mohan, Nayanthara, Narain, Vinoth Kishan and Rahul Bose in the lead roles, while Vijayalakshmi, Charle, Ashish Vidyarthi, Azhagam Perumal and Bagavathi Perumal in supporting roles.

The film was announced in March 2022 without a title, which was revealed only that September. Principal photography commenced in March 2022 and wrapped by that November. The music is composed by Yuvan Shankar Raja, while the cinematography and editing are handled by Hari K. Vedantam and J. V. Manikanda Balaji.

Iraivan was released on 28 September 2023, where it received mixed-to-negative reviews from critics and became a box-office bomb.

== Plot ==
Arjun is an DCP known for his unorthodox approach to apprehending suspects through lethal encounters rather than adhering to standard arrest protocols. He harbors affection for Priya, the sister of his colleague and friend, Andrew. However, he hesitates to commit to marriage due to the enemies he has amassed during his aggressive law enforcement career, anticipating retaliation from those he has crossed.

Meanwhile, the city is gripped by fear as a psychopathic serial killer, nicknamed the "Smile-Killer" for leaving distinctive smiley face notes near the crime scenes, abducts and gruesomely murders young girls. Arjun and Andrew are assigned to this harrowing case. Andrew loses his life while confronting the killer, who is later identified as Brahma. Haunted by the trauma of this investigation, Arjun resigns from the police force. Together with Priya, he embarks on a new path by opening a cafe, seeking a tranquil existence.

A year later, panic resurfaces when reports suggest that Brahma has escaped from prison. Subsequently, Shanmugam, the doctor responsible for Brahma's care while incarcerated, is found dead. Shanmugam's daughter Swetha too falls victim to the same gruesome fate as Brahma's prior victims, bearing the killer's signature. Arjun is sent a death threat letter, seemingly from Brahma. The Smile-Killer's spree intensifies, with increasingly brutal acts and the disturbing practice of sending video footage of the victims' torment and murder to their families and the media. The grim videos drive some family members of the victims to commit suicide.

The disappearance of Shalu, the only survivor of a previous encounter with Brahma, draws the attention of the police and Arjun. There is a belief that Brahma has abducted her once again to complete his unfinished task. Investigations reveal that Brahma may not intend to kill Shallu because he sees her as a willing participant, given her nymphomaniac tendencies. In a previous abduction, Shalu's response to Brahma's torture was arousal rather than fear, which diverged from Brahma's typical satisfaction derived from his victims' screams of panic. Arjun eventually locates the site where Shalu is held captive, the same place where Brahma was previously apprehended. A confrontation ensues, during which Arjun questions Brahma's role and discovers that someone else has been using Brahma's name for the most recent murders, but Brahma refuses to reveal the other person's identity. The police arrives and fatally shoots Brahma.

The Smile-Killer's reign of terror continues, raising suspicions that another individual is impersonating Brahma. After a thorough investigation, Arjun believes that Babu, an assistant to Church Father Sebastian and a previous suspect, is the copycat killer. However, evidence implicates Arjun when it is revealed that the video of Shalu's captivity was sent from his location. In an attempt to apprehend Babu, Arjun uses his characteristic aggressive methods. The police intervenes to save Babu, and in the heated exchange, Arjun confesses to kidnapping Shalu and sending the video to a TV channel. He insists that it was a play to trap Brahma as he knew that Brahma considered Shalu a partner rather than a victim. Meanwhile, Babu goes to the media regarding his mistreatment at the hands of Arjun and the police force, leading to the public sentiment leaning in his favor.

Later that evening, Arjun uncovers compelling evidence at Babu's store that links him to the crimes. En route to Babu's arrest, he receives a phone call from Andrew's widow Jasmine who reveals that Babu has abducted her daughter Sophie. Babu promises to disclose Sophie's location only if Arjun complies with his demands. Arjun agrees and embarks on a journey to meet Babu, but a tragic turn of events occurs when Jasmine attempts to take her own life, seemingly as part of Babu's demands. Ultimately, a hostage exchange takes place with Priya joining the scene, per Babu's request for her in exchange for Sophie. In the process, Arjun intervenes, incapacitating Babu and saving both Priya and Sophie.

The police force fakes Babu's death due to the public sentiment regarding his innocence and holds him captive in secret. The movie ends with them leaving the room so that Babu can be dealt with by Arjun.

== Cast ==
- Ravi Mohan as ACP Arjun IPS
- Nayanthara as Priya, Andrew's sister and Arjun's love interest
- Narain as ACP Andrew IPS, Jasmine's husband and Priya's brother
- Rahul Bose as "Smiley Killer" Brahma
- Vinoth Kishan as "Copycat Killer" Babu
- Vijayalakshmi as Jasmine Andrews, Andrew's wife and Priya's sister-in-law
- Charle as Dr. Yoganand
- Ashish Vidyarthi as Commissioner Hari Vedanth IPS
- Azhagam Perumal as DCP Mani IPS
- Bagavathi Perumal as ACP Franck IPS
- Ashwin Kkumar as Ganesh, Shalu's boyfriend
- Aishwarya Suresh (Lachu) as Shalu, Ganesh's nymphomaniac girlfriend
- Uday Mahesh as Church Father Sebastian
- Badava Gopi as Journalist and TV Anchor
- Kumar Natarajan as Dr. Shanmugam
- George Vijay Nelson as Inspector Marudhu
- Sanjana Tiwari as Divya, Yoganand's daughter
- Porkodi as Yoganand's wife
- Sujatha Babu as Mani's wife
- Baby Aazhiya as Sophie Andrew, Andrew's and Jasmine's daughter

== Production ==
=== Development ===
In May 2021, actor Ravi Mohan and director I. Ahmed were reported to do a movie together, doing so after Jana Gana Mana, which had it shooting on hold due to COVID-19 pandemic and was not resumed. Nayanthara was reported to play the lead female role alongside Ravi after Thani Oruvan (2015), with her also receiving a remuneration of ₹10 crore for 20-days call sheet. Harris Jayaraj was reported to compose the soundtrack for the film, collaborating with Ahmed after Endrendrum Punnagai (2013), until they finalised Yuvan Shankar Raja as the composer. On 30 March 2022, coinciding with Ahmed's birthday, Ravi and Ahmed, via Twitter, confirmed doing a film together. The title Iraivan was revealed on Ravi's birthday (10 September).

=== Filming ===
Principal photography began in March 2022 with the first schedule in Chennai. Nayanthara finished shooting her portions by 14 August, while the whole shooting wrapped by 1 November.

== Music ==
Iraivan

Soundtrack album by Yuvan Shankar Raja
- Released: 25 August 2023
- Recorded: 2022–2023
- Studios: U1 Records, Chennai
- Genre: Film soundtrack
- Length: 18:58
- Label: Times Music
- Producer: Yuvan Shankar Raja

Yuvan Shankar Raja chronology
Paramporul (2023)	Iraivan (2023)	Conjuring Kannappan (2023)

The film's music and background score is composed by Yuvan Shankar Raja in his second collaboration with Ahmed after Vaamanan (2009) and fifth with Ravi after Daas (2005), Deepavali (2007), Thillalangadi (2010), and Ameerin Aadhi-Bhagavan (2013). Times Music purchased the music rights for the film. The first single "Azhagai" was released on 9 September 2023.

All tracks are written by Vivek.

Track listing
No.	Title	Singer(s)	Length
1.	"Azhagai"	Sanjith Hegde, Kharesma Ravichandran	3:41
2.	"Idhu Pola"	Yuvan Shankar Raja, Shakthisree Gopalan	4:04
3.	"Shades of Love"	Armaan Malik, Shivani Paneerselvam	3:49
4.	"Nanbha"	Haricharan	4:34
5.	"Fear Beat"	Yuvan Shankar Raja, ADK	3:38
Total length:			18:58

== Release ==
=== Theatrical ===
Iraivan was initially scheduled for a theatrical release on 25 August 2023, but was postponed due to unfinished post-production work. It was later released on 28 September 2023, clashing with the Raghava Lawrence-starrer Chandramukhi 2 and the Siddharth-starrer Chithha. The film received an A certificate for its violent content, becoming Ravi's first film since Ameerin Aadhi-Bhagavan to do so. The distribution rights of the film in Tamil Nadu were acquired by Udhayanidhi Stalin, T. Kishore and G. Srinivasan under the banner of Red Giant Movies, Think Studios and S Picture.

=== Home media ===
The streaming platform, Netflix, acquired the digital rights for the film, while the satellite rights were sold to Kalaignar TV.

== Reception ==
Iraivan received mixed-to-negative reviews from critics with praise for Ravi's performance, the background score, and the action sequences, but criticism for the screenwriting, soundtrack, excessive violence, and romantic scenes.

Anandu Suresh of The Indian Express gave the film 1 out of 5 stars and wrote "Iraivan is the latest addition to the never-ending list of brainless psychological action thrillers our film industries keep churning out." Logesh Balachandran of The Times of India gave the film 2.5 out of 5 stars and wrote the "director's decision to make all the losses personal to the protagonist doesn't work much and only turns it into a common narrative". P Sangeetha of OTTPlay rated the film with 2 out of 5 stars and wrote "Director Ahmed's Iraivan is full of heavy-duty violence and gore that gets tiring after a point. The thriller is let down by a weak screenplay that leaves many loose ends". Navein Darshan of The New Indian Express rated the film 3/5 and wrote "However, it feels rather odd that a film titled after God is devoid of any backstories. After all, isn't God built on interesting origin tales?".
