= MK Balaji =

Indian singer

- Genres: Indian music . Hip hop . Pop
- Occupations: Singer, lyricist, television presenter, performer

MK Balaji is an Indian singer, songwriter, composer and independent artist from Chennai. As a playback singer he has sung more than 200 songs in Tamil, Telugu and Kannada. His first song a lyricist was for the movie Sethupathi. He has hosted popular TV shows in Star Vijay and Zee Tamil. He made a debut as an indie artist with his single Good Naai bad Aadu that takes a fun jab at meat eating animal lovers.

== Biography ==
MK Balaji is the voice behind many South Indian film songs including "Rettai Kathire" from the Tamil movie Maattrraan directed by K. V. Anand starring Surya Sivakumar. He has delivered many successful songs in Tamil and Telugu. He has also collaborated with music directors like D Imman, Karthik Raja, Sundar C. Babu, Taj Noor, James Vasanthan, Sirpy, Sabesh–Murali and Srikanth Deva.

== Early music ==
He started his singing career with reality shows on television. His band V3, of which he was the lead singer, presented a sound track in the Oohlalala album which consists of original compositions by the winners of the show Oohlalala aired on the Tamil channel Sun TV. It was judged by the Oscar winner AR Rahman. His band was judged the winning band and he eventually got the breakthrough as a playback singer.

== Discography ==
Below is the partial discography of the songs sung by MK Balaji.

Film songs

Song title	Film/album	Music director	co singers
Hey Mama	Sethupathi	Nivas K. Prasanna	Anirudh Ravichandar
Rettai Kathirae	Maattrraan	Harris Jayaraj	Krish
Oru Oorla Rendu Raja	Oru Oorla Rendu Raja	D. Imman	Anthony Daasan
Sara Sara Saravedi	Idhu Kathirvelan Kadhal	Harris Jayaraj	KK, Srilekha
Kadal Naan Thaan	Endrendrum Punnagai	Harris Jayaraj	Sudha Ragunathan, Suzanne D'Mello
I'm a Fighter	Oh My Dog	Nivas K. Prasanna	Yuvan Shankar Raja, Nivas K. Prasanna, MK Balaji
Vellaikari	Irumbu Kottai Murattu Singam	G. V. Prakash Kumar	NSK Ramya
Enge poveno	Angadi Theru	Vijay Antony	Benny Dayal
Dhool Tucker	Dhool Tucker Single	L.V Ganesan	feat Prabhu Deva
Unnai Enni	Aayirathil Iruvar	Bharadwaj	
Sexy Lady	Ninaithale Inikkum	Vijay Antony	NSK Ramya, Maya
Thulle Rani	Super Cowboy(Telugu)	G. V. Prakash Kumar	NSK Ramya
Dilamo Dilamo	Mahatma (Telugu)	Vijay Antony	Sangeetha
Tuneega Tuneega	Tuneega Tuneega	Karthik Raja	

Single

Song title	Featuring	Record label
Good Naai Bad Aadu	MK Balaji, Teju Ashwini, Sudhir Ravichandran	Saregama

As lyricist

Song title	Film/album	Music director	Singers
"Hawa hawa"	Sethupathi	"Nivas K. Prasanna"	"Karthik, Sanindhavi
I'm a Fighter	Oh My Dog	Nivas K. Prasanna	Yuvan Shankar Raja, Nivas K. Prasanna, MK Balaji
Good Naai Bad Aadu	"Single"	"MK Balaji"	

As TV Host

TV Show	for TV Channel
Paadum Office	Star Vijay
Sa Re Ga Ma Pa	Zee Tamil
