= Kesha Khambhati =

Indian model and actress

- Born: 8 February 1989 (age 37); Surat, India
- Occupations: Model, actress
- Years active: 2014-present

Kesha Khambhati is an Indian model and actress who has appeared in Telugu and Tamil films. After making her debut in Telugu cinema with Heart Attack (2014), Kesha appeared in a leading role in Saran's Aayirathil Iruvar (2017).

== Career ==
Kesha made her debut by appearing in an item number in the Telugu film, Shadow (2013) featuring in the title track. In early January 2014, Kesha was cast in director Saran's Tamil film, Aayirathil Iruvar and was set to appear alongside two other debutants in roles opposite Vinay. Despite completing shoot, the film's release was stalled and did not have a theatrical release until September 2017. Kesha's first acting role release was in Puri Jagannadh's Telugu romantic drama film, Heart Attack (2014), where she featured as Priya, alongside Nithiin and Adah Sharma. She shot for the film in India and Thailand, and labelled the film as a "turning point" of her career. In 2015, she appeared in the low-budget Telugu comedy Best Actors in an ensemble cast.

In 2016, following the death of television actress Pratyusha Banerjee, her boyfriend Rahul Raj Singh was brought to the media's attention. Along with another actress, Heer Patel, Kesha Khambati also brought a separate a court case against Singh. Kesha accused Singh of becoming close to her in order to take money from her, and sought a value of two lakh rupees to be returned.

== Filmography ==
Year	Film	Role	Language	Notes
2013	Shadow		Telugu	Special appearance
2014	Heart Attack	Priya	Telugu	
2015	Best Actors		Telugu	
2017	Aayirathil Iruvar	Urmila Naidu	Tamil	
