= Pekamedalu =

2024 Indian film by Neelagiri Mamilla

- Theatrical release poster
- Directed by: Neelagiri Mamilla
- Screenplay by: Neelagiri Mamilla; Hamza Ali; Sreenivas Ittam
- Story by: Neelagiri Mamilla
- Produced by: Rakesh Varre
- Starring: Vinoth Kishan; Anoosha Krishna
- Cinematography: Haricharan K.
- Edited by: Srujana Adusumilli; Hamza Ali
- Music by: Smaran
- Production company: Crazy Ants Productions
- Release date: 19 July 2024
- Country: India
- Language: Telugu

Pekamedalu (transl. House of cards) is a 2024 Indian Telugu-language comedy drama film directed by Neelagiri Mamilla and produced by Rakesh Varre through Crazy Ants Productions. The film features Vinoth Kishan and Anoosha Krishna in lead roles, with music composed by Smaran. Pekamedalu was released on 19 July 2024.

== Plot ==
The story centers on Laxman (Vinod Kishan), an engineering graduate living in a small neighborhood in Hyderabad. Unlike most, Laxman has no interest in pursuing a conventional job. Instead, he dreams of making quick money through real estate and plays online rummy all the time and building castles in the air. His wife, Varalaxmi (Anoosha Krishna), supports the family by making and selling snacks, also working in other households. She aspires to start her own curry point, needing Rs.50,000 for the venture. Laxman borrows this amount from a friend called Shivanna but spends it on personal needs. He lies to Varalaxmi he got the amount through one of his deals.

Laxman becomes entangled with an NRI woman, Swetha (Rethika Srinivas), married to another man, under the guise of a real estate business partnership. This affair introduces significant changes in his life. Laxman decides to marry Swetha for her property, who decides to give divorce to her husband, who is against this. Meanwhile, Laxman friend warns his actions as wrong, but he wantedly makes a deaf year and asks for a divorce to Varalaxmi, which makes her shatter.

Later in one of his business meetings, the client reveals himself as Swetha's brother and gets to know all the facts through his brother in law and bashes Laxman. Then, he records all the truth from Laxman and sends it to her sister, and then she ends her relationship with him. After coming home, he gets to know that Varalaxmi went back to her hometown. Later, both families meet for a settlement with their community people. Their Laxman shows his chauvinistic nature towards Varalaxmi and orders to come back his home. But her brother bashes Laxman and his family by blaming them as frauds. Later, Varalaxmi decides to go back to her husband because of unbearable taunts by her sister in law.

After coming back to her home, Laxman becomes decent, and he gets a small job in BPO. Life seems happy for Varalaxmi they puts a financial goals to increase their lifestyle, and one of her household supports her financially to set up a curries point in a center, which eventually becomes a profitable vent one day, Varalaxmi accidentally lifts the call of Laxman and gets to know that he left the job a week ago without informing anyone. Then she confronts her husband again, and then he shows his real face and slaps her.

Later, Laxman comes to her workplace to apologize, and then suddenly, Shivanna appears and asks his money. Laxman tries to manage the situation, but Varalaxmi overheard all the facts and shouts at him. Then, the reckless Laxman slaps his wife again and damages all the products and leaves. Later, the Varalaxmi's house hold who is a cop who has a daughterly affection on her bashes Laxman and warns him to be straight. Later at night, Laxman becomes angered and commits Domestic Violence against Varalaxmi, then she retaliates back then the neighbors become alert and tries to bash Laxman but he escapes from them then they safe guards Varalaxmi and her son Tinku.

After one year, now Varalaxmi is shifted to a middle-class locality with her son, and now her curries point business is increased into an outlet. The film ends with Laxman becoming a loafer and addicted completely online rummy.

== Cast ==
- Vinoth Kishan as Laxman
- Anoosha Krishna as Varalaxmi "Varalu", Laxman's wife
- Rethika Srinivas as Swetha
- Muralidhar Goud as Varalaxmi's relative
- Jagan Yogi Raj
- Anusha Nuthala
- Ganesh Thipparaju
- Naren Yadav

== Music ==
Pekamedalu

Soundtrack album by Smaran
- Released: 2024
- Recorded: 2024
- Language: Telugu
- Label: Sony Music India
- Producer: Smaran

Smaran chronology
Martin Luther King (2024)	Pekamedalu (2024)

The film's soundtrack album and background score were composed by Smaran.

All lyrics are written by Bhargava Karthik.

Track list
No.	Title	Singer(s)	Length
1.	"Boom Boom Lacchanna"	Mano; Background Vocals: Aishwarya Daruri, Sindujha Srinivasan, Vinayak, Rajshaker Katlakunta, Smaran	2:57
2.	"Adapilla – Her Anthem"	Sakae Rajashekar	4:38
3.	"Sher Shiva"	Niklesh Sunkoji, Saurabh Chaganty, Smaran Sai, Deviprasad Thatikonda, Ganesh, Vivek	1:30
4.	"Varalaxmi"	Smaran, Sarathy	3:34
Total length:			11:39

== Release and reception ==
Pekamedalu was released on 19 July 2024.

Citing it as "one of the best Telugu films", BH Harsh of The New Indian Express gave a rating of 4 out of 5, while praising Neelagiri Mamilla's direction, screenplay and performances of lead actors. He further stated "Pekamedalu one of the most captivating and impactful films of the year so far". Deccan Chronicle's Bhavana Sharma too echoed the same, while stating that "Pekamedalu relies on character-driven storytelling and genuine emotions". Giving a nearly positive review, The Times of India stated "Director Nilgri Mamilla did a commendable job portraying and narrating a story on real-life struggles, supported by content-oriented actors and great music". Suhas Sistu of The Hans India opined that the film have similar narratives like Ammo! Okato Tareekhu (2000), Sarada Saradaga (2006) and Sreeramachandralu, yet stands out with its unique storyline. Citing it as "must watch", Suhas in his review wrote that "Peka Medalu is a commendable effort in portraying real-life struggles and the importance of perseverance. With strong performances, especially by Vinod Kishan and Anusha Krishna, and solid technical work, the film delivers a heartfelt narrative".
