= Rethika Srinivas =

Indian film and Television actress

- Born: Chennai, Tamil Nadu
- Occupation: Actress

Rethika Srinivas is an Indian actress who appears in Tamil films.

== Career ==
Rethika graduated with a degree in electronic engineering from SRM University, before pursuing a master's degree in media studies in the United Kingdom. She subsequently began her own media company, Ice Breakers, which helped conduct shows in Dubai, while also working as a model in several ad films. While auditioning for an advertisement with TVC, she met director Balaji Sakthivel who had been casting actresses for his next venture. Rethika was selected and won critical acclaim for her performance as an arrogant, young mother in the director's drama film Vazhakku Enn 18/9 (2012). After receiving further film offers, she took a sabbatical from her job as a brand consultant and concentrated on acting ventures.

She has since worked in films including Biriyani (2013) and Massu Engira Masilamani (2015).

== Filmography ==
=== Tamil films ===
| Year | Title | Role | Notes |
|---|---|---|---|
| 2011 | Deiva Thirumagal | Bashyam's wife | |
| 2012 | Vazhakku Enn 18/9 | Jayalakshmi | |
| 2012 | Aarohanam | | |
| 2013 | Theeya Velai Seiyyanum Kumaru | Rekha Mohan | |
| 2013 | Biriyani | Radhika Varadharajan | |
| 2014 | Nimirndhu Nil | Sathyanur Savithri IAS | |
| 2014 | Ra | Ajay's sister | |
| 2015 | Massu Engira Masilamani | Padma | |
| 2017 | Kavan | Talent Show Judge | |
| 2017 | Saravanan Irukka Bayamaen | Fathima's mother | |
| 2017 | Aayirathil Iruvar | | |
| 2018 | Mannar Vagaiyara | Karunakaran's wife | |
| 2018 | Tik Tik Tik | Lt. Gen. T. Rithika | |
| 2021 | Kasada Thapara | Gopuram Chitra | |
| 2022 | Prince | School Principal | |
| 2022 | Coffee with Kadhal | Diya's mother | |
| 2022 | Therkathi Veeran | Commissioner | |
| 2023 | Run Baby Run | Victim's mother | |
| 2023 | 800 | Trinity College teacher | |
| 2023 | Kannagi | Lawyer | |
| 2024 | Nirangal Moondru | Shobha | |
| 2026 | Nee Forever | Mahalaxmi | |

=== Telugu films ===
| Year | Title | Role | Notes |
|---|---|---|---|
| 2015 | Janda Pai Kapiraju | Sathenapally Savithri IAS | |
| 2019 | Sita | Samrajyam | |
| 2024 | Pekamedalu | Swetha | |

=== Television ===
| Year | Title | Role | Network |
|---|---|---|---|
| | Chinna Maapley Periya Maapley | | |
| | Kaattula Mazhai | | |
| 2020 | Thanthu Vitten Ennai | Bhanumathy | ZEE5 |
| 2020 | Irai | NGO Head | Aha |
| 2023 | Modern Love Chennai | Devi's mother | Amazon Prime Video |

=== Short film ===
1. Kathai Neram
