= Adavi (film) =

2020 Tamil language film

- Directed by: G. Ramesh
- Screenplay by: Thenmozhi
- Story by: K Sambasivam
- Produced by: K Sambasivam
- Starring: Vinoth Kishan; Ammu Abhirami
- Cinematography: G. Ramesh
- Edited by: Sathish Kurosuwa
- Music by: Sarath Jada
- Production company: Shri Krish Pictures
- Release date: 7 February 2020
- Country: India
- Language: Tamil

Adavi (transl. Dense Forest that hides light) is a 2020 Tamil language romantic action film directed by G. Ramesh and starring Vinoth Kishan and Ammu Abhirami in the lead roles while the producer, Sambasivam, makes his film debut in a negative role.

== Plot ==
A tribe in a mountain tries to save their land from a greedy estate owner.

== Cast ==
- Vinoth Kishan as Murugan
- Ammu Abhirami as Valli
- R. N. R. Manohar as an estate owner
- Vishnupriya as Valli's friend
- Muthuraman
- K Sambasivam
- Attapadi Radhakrishnan
- Robo Chandru
- Munnar Ramesh

== Production ==
G. Ramesh, who previously directed Kallattam (2016), signed a film featuring several new faces in addition to the main actors. The film revolves around a land problem between the rich and the natives. The film was shot in Mettukal, near Kothagiri, in 20 days in 2 schedules.

== Soundtrack ==
Soundtrack was composed by Sarath Jada.

- Thalattu – Sarath Jada
- Pattuvana – Attapadi Radhakrishnan
- Rangamma – Attapadi Radhakrishnan
- Maman Magale – Attapadi Radhakishnan

== Release and reception ==
The Times of India gave the film two out of five stars and wrote that "The dated filmmaking, with earnest but raw performances, and the overly melodramatic treatment ensure that we are never emotionally touched". The Deccan Chronicle gave the film the same rating and criticized the film's screenplay while praising the cinematography.
