= I. Ahmed =

Indian film director

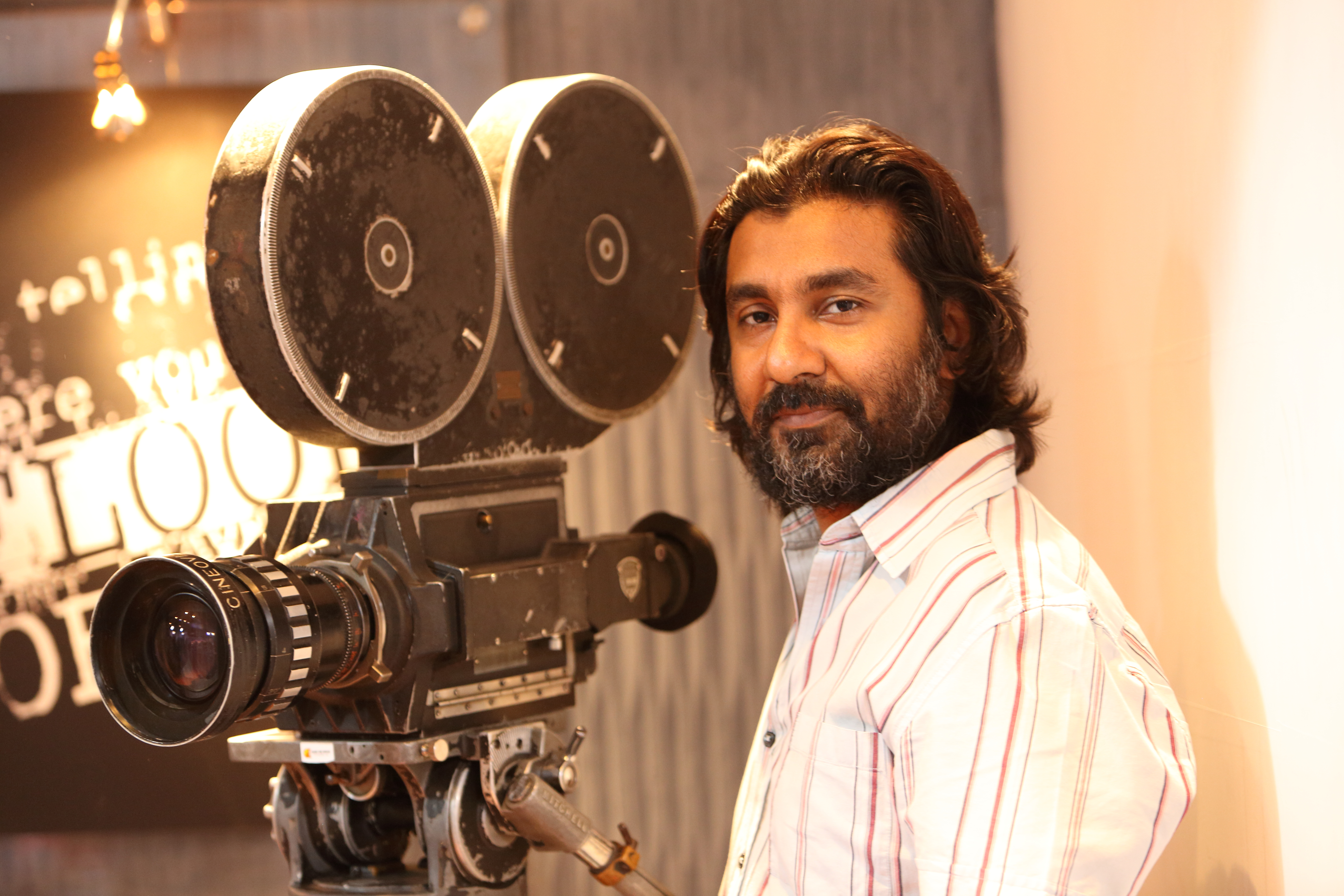
- Ahmed at the shoot of Endrendrum Punnagai in 2012
- Born: I. Mueenuddin; Chennai, Tamil Nadu, India
- Education: Loyola College, Chennai
- Occupation: Film director
- Years active: 2009–present

I. Ahmed is an Indian film director who works in Tamil films and is known for his romantic-comedy film Endrendrum Punnagai (2013).

== Early life and education ==
Mueenuddin was born and raised in Chennai, Tamil Nadu. He completed his degree in Visual Communication at Loyola College, Chennai.

== Career ==
Mueenuddin started his career as an assistant director to Kathir in Kadhal Desam (1996) and Kadhalar Dhinam (1999).

He then left to Singapore to start a career as a television commercial ad director and directed more than 80 short films and content in other genres. He was the creative director for the media companies UTV, Radio City in India and Singapore. He has also set up a radio station, designing the core content and the sound of the station.

He was invited by the Contemporary Asian Arts Center and LASALLE-SIA College of Arts in Singapore to collaborate with musicians and performance artists on an artistic project named "Wax City" held in Bali, Australia and Singapore. He is the managing partner of "Think Entertainment". His films Vaamanan and Endrendrum Punnagai were released in 2009 and 2013 respectively.

Two days after the release of the Endrendrum Punnagai, Ahmed was approached and signed on for a project by actor-producer Udhayanidhi Stalin, who was impressed with the director's work in the film. The pair announced that they would work on a film titled Idhayam Murali, a romantic musical set in New York City, and revealed that the film would be a multi-starrer with four prominent actors playing Stalin's friends. For one of the other leading male roles, the team had finalised Ashok Selvan. For the leading female role, Ahmed discussed the script with Trisha and Samantha, before signing on Hansika Motwani to play the character of an Indian girl studying in New York. Anirudh Ravichander was signed on as the music composer, while Madhie joined the team as the film's cinematographer. Prior to the start of production, Ahmed also revealed his intentions of remaking the film in Hindi in the future. In June 2015, the team decided to postpone the film owing to budget issues, and opted to work on another project together.

Ahmed directed his next Tamil-language movie titled Manithan, released in 2016 and had a genre of legal thriller. The film featured Udhayanidhi Stalin, Hansika Motwani, Radha Ravi, Prakash Raj, and Vivek. It is an official remake of Subhash Kapoor's Hindi film Jolly LLB (2013), which itself being loosely based on the 1999 Delhi hit-and-run case. The story of Manithan revolves around a struggling lawyer in his hometown, comes to Chennai to become successful. He goes all out against a wealthy man in a hit-and-run case hoping that the publicity would help his business. The story was slightly altered from a comedy-drama genre in the original to a drama-thriller theme in Manithan. His next film Iraivan is a thriller film starring Jayam Ravi.

== Filmography ==
Year	Film	Notes
2009	Vaamanan	
2013	Endrendrum Punnagai	
2016	Manithan	
2023	Iraivan	
