= Nesi (film) =

- Poster
- Directed by: Saravanan Krishna
- Produced by: J. S. Kannan
- Starring: Vikas; Sonia Suri
- Cinematography: G. Ramesh
- Music by: Sirpy
- Release date: 7 August 2009
- Country: India
- Language: Tamil

Nesi (transl. Be affectionate) is a 2009 Indian Tamil-language romantic drama directed by Saravana Krishna and produced by J. S. Kannan. The film stars newcomers Vikas and Sonia Suri. The film released on 7 August 2009 and was a box office failure.

== Cast ==
- Vikas as Siva
- Sonia Suri as Anjali
- Kadhal Sukumar as Siva's friend
- Mahadevan as Anjali's father
- Meera Krishnan as Siva's mother
- Chitti Babu
- Vijay Krishnaraj
- Sampath Ram
- Kamakshinathan

== Production ==
Choreographer John Babu's son, Vikas, made his debut alongside model Sonia Suri, who was spotted after acting in a jewellery advertisement. To prepare for his debut, Vikas learnt acting, dancing and fighting. The film was shot in Chennai, Karaikudi and Kodaikanal.

== Music ==
The music for the film was composed by Sirpy. The lyrics were written by Palani Bharathi.

Nesi

Soundtrack album by Sirpy
- Released: 2009
- Genre: Feature film soundtrack
- Length: 21:34
- Language: Tamil
- Label: Five Star Audio

Sirpy chronology
Unnai Kann Theduthe (2009)	Nesi (2009)
External audio
- Nesi – Jukebox on YouTube

Track listing
No.	Title	Singer(s)	Length
1.	"Ennodaya"	Harish Raghavendra, Shweta Mohan	4:21
2.	"Algebra"	Tippu	3:52
3.	"Kadhal"	Balram, Sujatha	4:13
4.	"Kalar"	Tippu	4:45
5.	"Nee Oru"	Anuradha Sriram, Ranjith	4:22
Total length:			21:34

== Reception ==
A critic from Dinamalar wrote that "the film will convince parents to think about opposing love". Sonia Suri received congratulatory calls from some audience members who had watched the film.
