= G. Ramesh =

Indian film director and actor

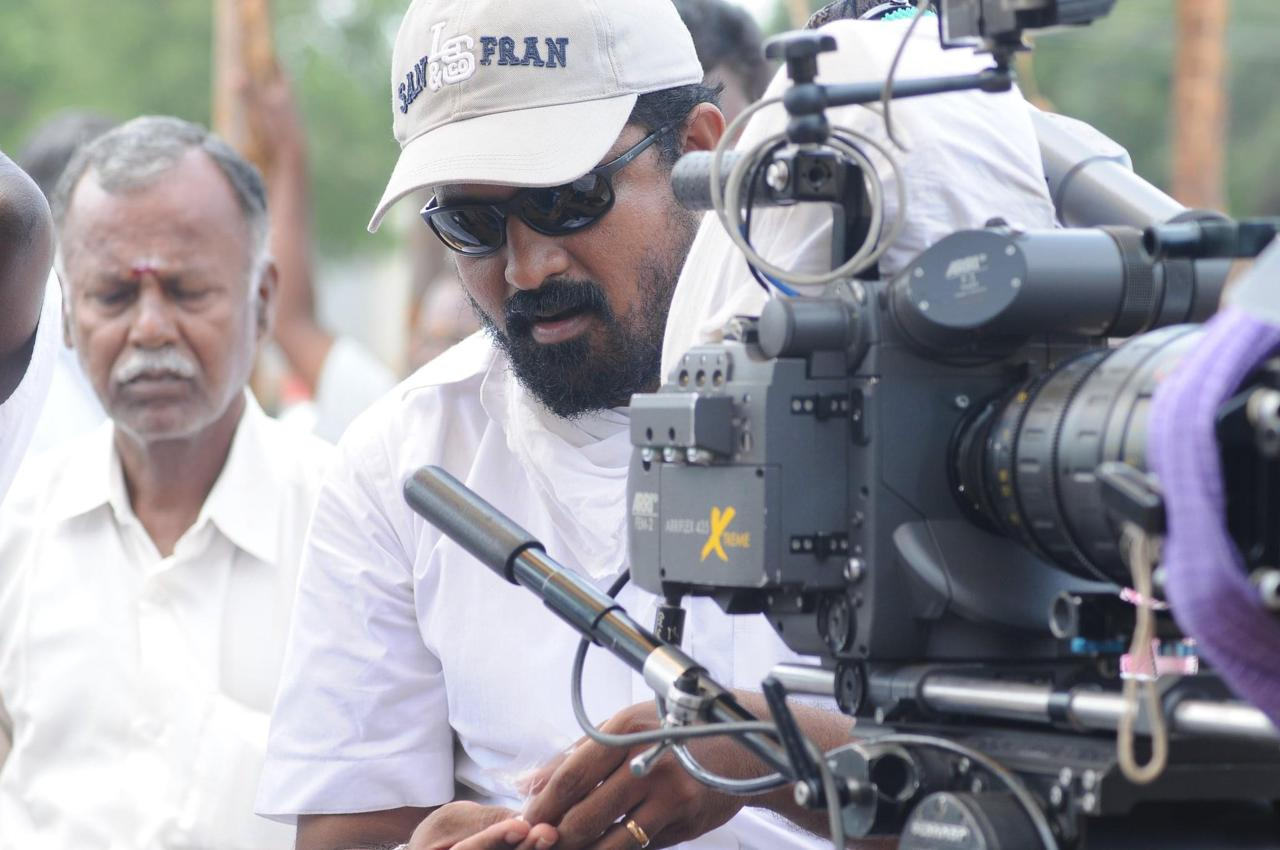
- Ramesh on set while shooting
- Born: Ramesh Gandhi; Chinnalampatti, Madurai, Tamil Nadu
- Occupation: Director of photography

G. Ramesh is an Indian cinematographer and director, who works in the Tamil film industry.

== Career ==
Born in Chinnalampatti, Madurai, Ramesh studied commerce and dreamt of becoming a cinematographer in films. He assisted cinematographers Ashokrajan in films like Purusha Lakshanam (1993), Nattamai (1994) and Muthu (1995) while also assisting B. Kannan.

He made his debut as a cinematographer with the romantic drama En Uyir Nee Thaane (1998), before working on Prabhu Solomon's Kannodu Kanbathellam (1999) and King (2002) with Vikram. Ramesh has often collaborated with cinematographer Natty Subramaniam and has been a part of his Hindi films, canning scenes in Paanch (2005) and Black Friday (2007), as well as in his acting debut Naalai (2006). Other notable films Ramesh has worked on include the Dhanush-starrers Thiruda Thirudi (2003) and Pudhukottaiyilirundhu Saravanan (2004), as well as the Ajith-starrer Aalwar (2007). He made his directorial debut with Kallattam (2016).

== Filmography ==
Cinematographer

- En Uyir Nee Thaane (1998)
- Kannodu Kanbathellam (1999)
- King (2002)
- Thiruda Thirudi (2003)
- Pudhukottaiyilirundhu Saravanan (2004)
- Selvam (2005)
- Naalai (2006)
- Aalwar (2007)
- Nesi (2009)
- Paakanum Pola Irukku (2017)

Director

- Kallattam (2016)
- Adavi (2020)
- Iruvar Ullam (2021) (Delayed release; Filmed in 2012–13)
