= Christopher (film) =

2023 Indian film by B. Unnikrishnan

- Theatrical release poster
- Directed by: B. Unnikrishnan
- Written by: Udaykrishna
- Produced by: B. Unnikrishnan
- Starring: Mammootty; Vinay Rai
- Cinematography: Faiz Siddik
- Edited by: Manoj
- Music by: Justin Varghese
- Production company: RD Illuminations
- Release date: 9 February 2023
- Running time: 150 minutes
- Country: India
- Language: Malayalam
- Budget: ₹18.7 crore
- Box office: ₹2.1 crore

Christopher is a 2023 Indian Malayalam-language vigilante action thriller film directed and produced by B. Unnikrishnan and written by Udaykrishna. It stars Mammootty, in the titular role, along with an ensemble cast of Vinay Rai, Amala Paul, Aishwarya Lekshmi, Sneha, Aditi Ravi, Shine Tom Chacko, Siddique, Dileesh Pothan, Deepak Parambol and Jinu Joseph. The film marks the debut of Vinay Rai in Malayalam cinema. The film revolves around the life journey of ADGP Christopher Antony, who uses vigilantism and police encounters to safeguard the civilians.

Principal photography began on 10 July 2022 and finished on 29 September 2022. The soundtrack and score was composed by Justin Varghese, while Faiz Siddik and Manoj handled the cinematography and editing respectively.

Christopher was released in theatres on 9 February 2023.

== Plot ==
During a communal riot in Kerala, a young Christopher witnesses the brutal rape and murder of his sister and parents. He attempts to kill the perpetrators with a butcher's knife but is intercepted by SP Vetrivel. After learning of the tragedy, Vetrivel executes the culprits in an extrajudicial encounter, inspiring Christopher to join the police force. Under Vetrivel's mentorship, Christopher clears the civil service exam and is posted as an ASP in Madhya Pradesh. There, he gains notoriety as an encounter specialist after dismantling a feudal network responsible for killing women. Assisted by his right-hand man, SI Mohammed Ismail, Christopher eventually returns to Kerala as an SP.

Following a successful mission against a robbery-murder syndicate in a forested area, Ismail is killed. Christopher adopts Ismail's daughter, Amina, and later marries Beena, the Pondicherry DC. Their domestic life unravels when Christopher discovers that Beena's drug-addict brother, Sebastian, has brutally murdered a girl and hidden her remains in a ceramic factory. Though Beena and her father, MP Chackochan, attempt to cover up the crime with the help of SP Abhilash, Christopher arrests Sebastian. When Sebastian attempts to escape custody during a court hearing, Christopher kills him, leading to his separation from Beena.

Years later, Christopher is an ADGP working under CM Rajashekhara Menon. After he executes four men for a brutal assault, ACP Sulekha is tasked with investigating his past encounter killings. Simultaneously, Amina, now a lawyer, uncovers evidence that business magnate Sitaram Trimurthi murdered his wife and father-in-law to hide a drug trafficking ring. Sitaram retaliates by having Amina murdered. Devastated, Christopher launches an unofficial investigation, discovering that Sitaram has compromised the official police team through the sociopathic DYSP George Kottarakkan.

Christopher tracks down the hitman, Marimuthu, and forces a confession that implicates Sitaram. Despite Sulekha's initial skepticism, she eventually supports Christopher after realizing the legal system's failure to provide swift justice. Christopher executes Marimuthu and Kottarakkan, but Sitaram manages to murder Beena via carbon monoxide poisoning from his prison cell. With the covert assistance of Warden SP Shaji (Ismail's brother), Christopher enters the prison and kills Sitaram, framing the act as self-defense. Cleared of all charges and backed by the Chief Minister, Christopher adopts a young victim's sister, naming her Amina, and resumes his duty.

== Cast ==
- Mammootty as ADGP Christopher Antony IPS/ Christy, Chief of DPCAW, later Headquarters ADGP
- Vinay Rai as Sitaram Trimurthi, owner of Saukya group of Herbal products and the main antagonist
- R. Sarathkumar as SP Vetrivel IPS, later DGP, Christopher's mentor
- Sneha as Home Secretary Beena Mariam Chacko IAS, Christopher's ex-wife but later reconciles with him
- Amala Paul as ACP Sulekha IPS, Christopher's subordinate
- Aishwarya Lekshmi as Adv. Amina Ismail, Christopher's adopted daughter and an investigative lawyer and social activist
- Aditi Ravi as Ashwini Trimurthi, Sitaram's wife
- Siddique as Chief Minister Rajashekharan Menon
- Dileesh Pothan as ADGP Abhilash Balakrishnan IPS, Christopher and Beena's friend
- Shine Tom Chacko as DYSP George Kottarakkan, a corrupt and sociopathic cop who is Trimurthi's partner and second antagonist
- Deepak Parambol as SI Mohammed Ismail, Christopher's trusted ally and Amina's late father
- Dileep K. Menon as Shaji, prison superintendent, Mohammed Ismail's elder brother & Amina's cousin
- Nebish Benson as Jeby, Seena's brother
- Vinitha Koshy as Seena, Jeby's sister
- Jinu Joseph as Brother "Pathalam" Suresh, Kottarakkan's friend
- Vijaykumar Prabhakaran as CI Mathews
- Benzi Mathews as North ADGP Gaurishankar IPS, Christopher's best friend and batchmate
- Mathew Varghese as DGP Varghese Mathew IPS, State Police Chief
- Ajit Koshy as ADGP Askar Ali IPS, Trimurthi's friend
- Vasanthi as CI Vadivukkarasi, Later SP
- K.V Manjulan as Doctor Sajan
- Rajesh Sharma as Harikumar, prison superintendent (retd)
- Manohari Joy as Agnes
- Keerthana Sreekumar as Annie
- Bilas Chandrahasan as Doctor
- Remya Suresh as Annie's mother
- Shaheen Siddique as Sebastian Chacko, Beena's younger brother
- Amal Rajdev as MP Chacko (Chackochan), Beena's and Sebastian's father
- Sohan Seenulal as a councillor
- Kalesh Ramanand as Sudeep Rajan
- Nitin Thomas

== Production ==
Principal photography began on 10 July 2022 with a pooja function. On 18 July 2022, Mammootty joined the sets of the film. The film is shot in many places across Kerala including Ernakulam, Pooyamkutty and Vandiperiyar. Vinay Rai was cast in to play the antagonist in the film, marking his debut in Malayalam cinema. Filming took 79 days and was completed on 29 September 2022. Mammootty had finished shooting his portions, in a span of 65 days, a week before filming ended. In post-production stage, the film was sent to the Central Board of Film Certification and was censored with a U/A certificate on 31 January 2023.

== Release ==
Christopher was released in theatres on 9 February 2023.

== Reception ==
Christopher received mixed reviews from critics.

=== Critical response ===
Gopika I. S. of The Times of India gave 3/5 stars and wrote "Christopher was expected to pack a punch, but falls flat. That said, it's a watchable movie with some redeeming elements."

Arjun Ramachandran of The South First gave 3/5 stars and wrote "Christopher is a visual feast for the masses who get to watch Mammootty in a stylish avatar. Delivered with a socially-relevant theme, it serves as a good comeback for Udaykrishna and B Unnikrishnan."

Sanjith Sridharan of OTTplay gave 3/5 stars and wrote "Mammootty's Christopher starts off as an edgy, stylish film with great visuals and music, but in the second half, it loses its momentum. That said, the film might just have enough going for it to continue Mammootty's streak at the box office."

Gayathri Gokul of The Week gave 3/5 stars and wrote "The movie might work fine as an entertainer for fans, but the storyline could have been developed better."

Latha Srinivasan of India Today gave 2.5/5 stars and wrote "The story just unfolds itself pretty much in the first half an hour and becomes very predictable. Had the script been better and the movie's run time shorter, Christopher would have been far more entertaining."

Anandu Suresh of The Indian Express gave 2/5 stars and wrote "Christopher gives the impression that in a 'flawed' system, extrajudicial executions are the only right thing. Even with its running time of close to two-and-a-half hours, the film's climax got over in the blink of an eye, leaving the viewers wondering what just happened."

Princy Alexander of Onmanorama wrote "Unnikrishnan and Udayakrishna's previous work Aaraattu, which featured Mohanlal in the lead, had not really gone down well with the audience, but this time, they have managed to pull off a pretty decent entertainer."

S.R. Praveen for The Hindu reviewing the film wrote "What the film lacks in substance, it seeks to make up for in Mammootty's swagger and a loud background score that numbs one with its repetitiveness. Christopher is one long, unfortunate celebration of encounter killings."
