= Vinoth Kishan =

Indian actor

- Born: 28 July 1989 (age 37)
- Other name: Vinod
- Education: Loyola College
- Occupation: actor
- Years active: 2001–present

Vinoth Kishan is an Indian actor who appears in Tamil films, besides a few Telugu and Malayalam films. He made his debut as a child artiste in Bala's Nandhaa (2001), before playing villain in Naan Mahaan Alla (2010) and Vidiyum Munn (2013).

== Career ==
Vinoth Kishan made his debut as a child artiste in Bala's Nandhaa (2001) portraying the younger version of Suriya's character before appearing in similar roles in Samasthanam (2002) and then Sena (2003). He also played a supporting role in A. L. Vijay's Kireedam (2007), portraying the younger brother of Ajith Kumar.

Kishan made a breakthrough portraying a villainous role in Suseenthiran's Naan Mahaan Alla (2010), where he played a ruthless college student who turns murderer, winning rave reviews for his portrayal. To prepare for the role, he trained in stunts for three months under fight choreographer Mahendran and then shot for the film for forty days. After being impressed with his role in the film, director Balaji roped in to play antihero in Vidiyum Munn (2013). For his role, he prepared extensively by practising the art of not blinking, as his character demanded such an approach and won positive reviews from critics for his portrayal.

== Filmography ==
Key
†	Denotes films that have not yet been released

=== Tamil films ===
Year	Film	Role	Notes
2001	Nandhaa	Young Nandhaa	Child artiste
2002	Samasthanam	Young Shankara	Child artiste
2003	Sena	Young Sena	Child artiste
2007	Kireedam	Vinoth	
2010	Naan Mahaan Alla		Nominated-Vijay Award for Best Villain
2012	Kaliyugam		
2013	Vidiyum Munn	Chinnayyah	
2014	Jeeva		
2017	Nenjil Thunivirundhal	Durai Pandi's henchman	Bilingual film
2017	Yaazh	Sudan	Direct release on YouTube
2018	6 Athiyayam		Segment: Sithiram Kolluthadi
2018	Imaikkaa Nodigal	Vineeth	
2020	Adavi	Murugan	
2020	Danny	Kavi	
2020	Andhaghaaram	Selvam	
2021	Kutty Story	Young Aadhi	
2023	Beginning	Bala Subramaniam	
2023	Vaan Moondru	Joshua	
2023	Iraivan	"Copycat Killer" Babu	
2024	Captain Miller	Muthuswami	
2024	Konjam Pesinaal Yenna	Ajay	
2024	The Akaali	Vincent	
2026	Double Occupancy	Karthik	
2026	Selvi	Purushothaman	
2026	Angelina	TBA	

=== Other language films ===
Year	Film	Role	Language	Notes
2011	Kanakompathu		Malayalam	credited as Vinod Krishnan
2012	Genius	Jeevanandam	Telugu	
2017	C/O Surya	Sambasivudu's henchman	Telugu	Bilingual film
2020	Cochin Shadhi at Chennai 03	Auto Renjan	Malayalam	
2024	Gangs of Godavari	Viswam	Telugu	
2024	Pekamedalu	Laxman	Telugu	

=== Other projects ===
Key
†	Denotes projects that have not yet been released

- All projects are in Tamil, unless otherwise noted.

Year	Title	Role	Notes
2017	Aagaasa Vaani	Vinoth	Music Video
2020	Visarani	Arun	Short Film
2021	Magavu	Direction Team	Short Film
2022	Fingertip		Web Series
2022	Anantham		Web Series
2023	Story of Things		Sony LIV Originals Segment: Mirror
