= Shadow (2013 film) =

- Theatrical release poster
- Directed by: Meher Ramesh
- Written by: Kona Venkat; Gopimohan
- Screenplay by: Meher Ramesh
- Story by: Kona Venkat; Gopimohan
- Produced by: Paruchuri Kireeti
- Starring: Venkatesh; Srikanth; Aditya Pancholi; Taapsee; Nyra Banerjee
- Cinematography: Prasad Murella
- Edited by: Marthand K. Venkatesh
- Music by: S. Thaman
- Production company: United Movies
- Distributed by: Suresh Productions (USA & Canada)
- Release date: 26 April 2013
- Running time: 160 minutes
- Country: India
- Language: Telugu
- Budget: ₹30 crore (US$3.1 million)
- Box office: ₹10.2 crore (US$1.1 million)

Shadow is a 2013 Indian Telugu language action comedy thriller film directed by Meher Ramesh and produced by Paruchuri Kireeti on United Movies banner. The film stars Venkatesh, Srikanth, Aditya Pancholi, Taapsee, and Nyra Banerjee. The music was composed by S. Thaman with cinematography by Prasad Murella and editing by Marthand K. Venkatesh.

The film released on 26 April 2013. It was later dubbed into Tamil under the same title and in Hindi as Meri Jung: One Man Army by Sumeet Arts in 2013.

== Plot ==
Rajaram (Venkatesh) is the son of Raghuram (Naga Babu), an investigative journalist in a United Nations agency who infiltrates the criminal organization of Nana Bhai (Aditya Pancholi) and earns his trust. He gathers proof against Nana's activities and hands them over to newspaper publisher Chaitanya Prasad alias CP (Sayaji Shinde). This is discovered by Nana Bhai, who murders Raghuram in an exceedingly brutal manner. He additionally destroys Raghuram's family. Rajaram manages to flee from the massacre and vows to get revenge on Nana. With the assistance of Baba (Nassar), Rajaram grows up to be a strong young man. He assumes the identity of Shadow and starts looking for members of Nana's gang in Malaysia. With the help of his friends who were raised by Baba, Rajaram first kills Shakeel (Mukthar Khan), a member of Nana Bhai's gang.

Meanwhile, ACP Prathap (Srikanth), a tricky police officer in the UN agency, also arrives in Malaysia with a special team of officers searching for Nana Bhai and his gang. Prathap and his team manage to arrest Robert (Supreeth), another member of Nana's gang, and keep him in a high-security jail to be taken to India. Nana's brothers Jeeva (Rahul Dev) and Lala find out about Robert's arrest and plan to free him from police custody before Nana finds out. Rajaram too learns about Robert's arrest from Baba and assures that Robert will not leave Malaysia alive. However, Rajaram gets arrested by the police on purpose for being drunk and causing a nuisance. He is taken to the same high-security jail where Robert is imprisoned. He sedates a police officer and kills Robert after revealing his identity to him. After sensing something amiss, Prathap arrives at the prison only to find Robert dead. Rajaram escapes by covering the entire prison with smoke. He gets acquainted with Dr. Donga Srinivasa Rao alias Psycho Seenu (M. S. Narayana) and his team of students, who perform postmortem on Robert's body and hand it over to the police. Madhubala (Taapsee) is also a member of Psycho Seenu's team and becomes friendly with Raja.

Soon, a private funeral is held for Robert in a cemetery. Nana Bhai attends the funeral with Jeeva and Lala. Rajaram disguises himself as one of the priests and arrives at the cemetery to finish off Nana and his brothers. Prathap and his team are also at the cemetery in hiding to catch Nana and his brothers red-handed. However, their plans fail as Lala spots the gun, which Rajaram had placed on the tree, and gets shot, saving Nana Bhai. This results in a major shootout in the cemetery. Nana Bhai and Jeeva escape leaving Lala behind. Lala is arrested by Prathap's team and taken to the hospital. Rajaram also escapes from the cemetery and evades the police after a long chase. However he jumps off a truck, rolls down a slope and hits his head hard on a steel post, suffering a major injury. Psycho Seenu spots Rajaram, who falls on his vehicle due to dizziness and takes him to his house where his students also reside. Madhubala is shocked to see Rajaram injured and gives him first aid, a haircut and a new look. Rajaram soon regains consciousness and starts behaving like a child. Psycho Seenu and his team take him to the hospital and learn from the doctor that Rajaram has lost his memory due to his head injury. The doctor also reveals that Rajaram can regain his memory if he sees someone or something he vividly remembers and advises them to take good care of him till then. Soon, everyone starts calling Rajaram as Chanti since they are unaware of his real name.

Meanwhile, Nana Bhai and Jeeva learn that Lala is out of danger at the hospital but still in a coma. They decide to free him from police custody after he regains consciousness. Later, Psycho Seenu and some of his students take Rajaram to the hospital to give him electroconvulsive therapy to help him regain his memories. However, Psycho Seenu ends up receiving the shock treatment due to a mix-up. Prathap is also at the same hospital, video chatting with his wife Bindu (Nyra Banerjee). Rajaram arrives and is introduced to Bindu as Chanti by Prathap. Jeeva arrives at the hospital with some goons to free Lala and kills many policemen. Prathap hears the sounds of gunshots and goes to investigate, leaving Rajaram to chat with Bindu. However, Bindu is also tensed and asks Rajaram to check on Prathap. She calls out to her mother. Rajaram is shocked to see his mother Lakshmi (Geetha) alive and finally regains his memories. He realizes that Bindu is his sister and Prathap is his brother-in-law. He also joins the fight and kills all of Jeeva's goons. Baba gets shot by Jeeva thereby saving Rajaram. He blesses Raja after learning that his mother and sister are still alive and dies in the arms of Rajaram and his friends. Lala is found and arrested by Prathap. Rajaram fights with Jeeva at the top of the hospital and kills him by stabbing him and throwing him from the top of the building. Lala is devastated to see his brother Jeeva dead, and Nana Bhai is shocked to learn the same. Prathap and his team arrive in Hyderabad with Lala. Commissioner Thyagi (Nagineedu) calls Nana Bhai to inform him about Lala's arrival to Hyderabad. Rajaram also arrives in Hyderabad with his friends. He learns that Psycho Seenu is staying in the house opposite to Prathap's house and stays with him. He sees his mother and sister from a distance. He is happy to learn about his sister Bindu's pregnancy. Prathap spots Rajaram and greets him as Chanti.

On the eve of Raksha Bandhan, Bindu is in tears as she is missing her brother. Rajaram arrives and asks her to tie a Rakhi to his hand. She emotionally does so and starts calling him as her brother. Rajaram learns about the bomb blasts Nana Bhai has planned by looking into Prathap's laptop. Lakshmi soon realizes that Chanti is indeed her long-lost son Rajaram and shares an emotional reunion with him. She reveals that she and Bindu had managed to jump off the boat just before the explosion but could not find him after coming out from the water. She also reveals that she came with Bindu to Hyderabad to kill her brother Journalist Surya (Surya) for betraying Raghuram only to find him dead. Lakshmi tells him that his aunt (Vinaya Prasad) knows who the killers are but refused to reveal. Raja and his mother reunite with his estranged aunt at the temple. She finally reveals the truth that Commissioner Thyagi (who was an ACP then) and CP are Nana Bhai's partners in crime. They are the ones who brutally murdered his uncle Surya. Raja vows to punish them for their sins. CP and Nana Bhai meet to plan bomb blasts at Acharyaji's press meet. Nana Bhai learns that his brother is being tortured by Prathap in police custody and orders Thyagi to kill Prathap. Thyagi plans to kill Prathap during Ganesh Immersion with the help of a goon. However, Rajaram arrives at the Ganesh Immersion, kills the goon, and brutally stabs Thyagi to death after revealing his true identity.

Madhubala witnesses the murder along with Psycho Seenu and is shocked. Prathap is shocked to learn that Shadow has murdered the commissioner and gets help from two drunk eyewitnesses. Madhu arrives tensed at Prathap's house and reveals to Lakshmi that Chanti is the killer. However she learns that Chanti is actually Lakshmi's son Rajaram. Rajaram reveals about his past to Madhu, who supports him after learning the truth. She and Raja fall in love with each other. Raja learns that CP is arriving in Hyderabad soon to attend an International Media Seminar in which the home minister Nayudu (Jaya Prakash Reddy) is the chief guest. With the help of Psycho Seenu, Home Minister Naidu and Madhu, Rajaram sneaks past security into the International Media Seminar. He confronts CP with Naidu's help and brutally shoots him to death using Prathap's revolver. Through Guru Bhai (Satya Prakash), Nana Bhai learns that Raghuram's wife Lakshmi is still alive and that Prathap is her son-in-law.

Intelligence officer Chakravarthy (Suman) arrives from Delhi to meet with Prathap and his team. Prathap is shocked to learn that Thyagi and Chaitanya Prasad were Nana Bhai's partners in crime and have been working with him for the past 20 years. With the help of Chakravarthy, he realizes that Guru Bhai is still alive and that Chanti is Shadow. Prathap arrives at his house to confront Chanti/Shadow. He is shocked to learn that Chanti/Shadow is none other than Bindu's long-lost elder brother Rajaram. Bindu too is shocked to learn the same from her mother. Prathap learns that Acharyaji's scheduled meeting in Bangalore is cancelled due to riots and rescheduled in Hyderabad, which makes him realize that Nana had planned the bomb blasts in this very meeting. Nana Bhai and his goons attack Prathap and his team and free Lala from police custody. Prathap is hospitalized in a critical state, which shocks Bindu. Rajaram arrives at the hospital and reunites with Bindu. He learns that Nana Bhai has abducted his mother Lakshmi. Shivaji (Rao Ramesh), Acharyaji's deputy, is also revealed as Nana Bhai's partner. Rajaram arrives and finally kills Shivaji, Guru Bhai, Lala, Nana Bhai and all their goons. The film ends on a happy note as Prathap fully recovers and reunites with his family and Rajaram in the hospital.

== Cast ==
- Venkatesh as Rajaram / Shadow alias Chanti
- Srikanth as DCP Prathap
- Aditya Pancholi as Nana Bhai
- Taapsee as Madhubala
- Nyra Banerjee as Bindu, Rajaram's sister
- Nassar as Baba (Rajaram’s mentor)
- Sayaji Shinde as Chaithanya Prasad "CP"
- Naga Babu as Raghuram, Rajaram's father
- Geetha as Lakshmi, Rajaram's mother
- Suman as Chakravarthy, Intelligence officer
- M. S. Narayana as Dr. Donga Srinivasa Rao aka Psycho Srinu
- Dharmavarapu Subramanyam as Peter Penchalayya
- Jaya Prakash Reddy as Home Minister Neelakanta Naidu
- Chalapathi Rao as D.G.
- Nagineedu as Thyagi, Police Commissioner
- Subbaraju as Sanyasi Naidu, Home Minister's son
- Rao Ramesh as Sivaji
- Rahul Dev as Jeeva, Nana Bhai’s middle brother
- Supreeth as Robert, one of Nana Bhai’s right hands
- Satya Prakash as Guru Bhai, Nana Bhai’s bomb maker
- Surya as Journalist Surya (Lakshmi's brother)
- Vennela Kishore as Guru Bhai's henchman
- Krishna Bhagavaan as Kammareddy Kapuraju
- Prabhas Sreenu as Daambar, Shadow's friend and partner
- Srinivasa Reddy as Psycho Srinu's student
- Satyam Rajesh as Psycho Srinu's student
- Thagubothu Ramesh as Drunkard
- Venu Yeldandi as Drunkard
- Harshavardhan as Madhubala's brother
- Mukthar Khan as Shakeel, one of Nana Bhai’s right hands
- Uttej as Shadow's friend and partner
- Telangana Shakuntala as Home Minister's wife
- Hema as Madhubala's sister-in-law
- Vinaya Prasad as Lakshmi's sister-in-law
- Kesha Khambhati as Shadow's ally and an item number in the song "Shadow Title Track"

== Soundtrack ==
Shadow

Soundtrack album by S. Thaman
- Released: 15 March 2013
- Recorded: 2013
- Genre: Feature film soundtrack
- Length: 20:59
- Language: Telugu
- Label: T-Series
- Producer: S. Thaman

S. Thaman chronology
Jabardasth; Singam II (2013)	Shadow (2013)	Baadshah (2013)

The music of the film was composed by S. Thaman and released on T-Series Audio Company. The title track of this film was released at Ramanaidu Studios in Hyderabad. Venkatesh, V. V. Vinayak, Meher Ramesh, Producer Paruchuri Prasad, Paruchuri Kireeti, Kona Venkat, Gopimohan and Thaman attended this event. Vinayak launched the title song of the movie.

The audio launch of this film was held at Shilpakala Vedika in Hyderabad on 15 March 2013. Vinayak unveiled the T-Series audio albums and handed one to Boyapati Srinu. Gopichand Malineni, K. L. Narayana, Nagababu, Boyapati Srinu and V. V. Vinayak launched the songs of the movie. Madhurima, Kona Venkat, Gopimohan, Baba Sehgal, Adithya Pancholi attended this event.

Track listing
No.	Title	Lyrics	Singer(s)	Length
1.	"Shadow"	Chandrabose	Baba Sehgal, Naveen, Chorus	3:53
2.	"Gola Gola"	Viswa	Hemachandra, Ramya N.S, Thaman SS (Vocals), Vandhana	3:24
3.	"Pilla Manchi Bandhobasthu"	Bhaskarabhatla	Hemachandra, Suchitra	4:04
4.	"Naughty Girl"	Bhaskarabhatla, Kandikonda	Geetha Madhuri, Simha, Revanth	4:10
5.	"Aythalaka"	Ramajogayya Sastry	Hari Charan, Ranjith, Rahul Nambiar, Megha, Reeta, Anitha	4:01
6.	"Revenge of Shadow"	Ramajogayya Sastry	Chorus	1:27
Total length:				20:59

== Production ==
This is the first Tollywood film, played in Prasads Multiplex screen equipped with the high quality Auro 11.1 3D sound with 55 speakers.

=== Casting ===
The media reported that Venkatesh played the role of a mafia don in this film. However, he said that this was not the case Bollywood actor Aditya Pancholi is making his debut as villain in Telugu for this film.

== Release ==
Initially the film was scheduled for a Ugadi release on 11 April 2013. Later director Meher Ramesh confirmed that the film was postponed to 26 April 2013. The film was censored with a U/A certificate, obtained from the CBFC on 18 April 2013, and was released on the previously scheduled release date.

=== Distribution ===
Earlier sources reports that the film was to be released in the U.S. and Canada by Ficus. However, it was released in those countries by Suresh Productions through Praneeth Media.

=== Critical reception ===
The film received negative reviews from critics. Sashidhar AS from The Times of India website reviewed the film and stated, "It's a mash up of several other movies and does not showcase anything new." Shekhar from the Oneindia website reviewed and gave a rating of 2.5/5 for the film and said, "The director has failed in executing his ideas in crispy way. However, it is good entertainer, which will appeal both class and mass audience. It is a must watch film for Venky fans." A critic from the Way2movies website reviewed and gave a rating of 2/5 for the film and stated, "Even Venkatesh couldn't salvage 'Shadow'." Mahesh S Koneru from the 123telugu website reviewed and gave a rating of 2.25/5 for the film, and stated, "Meher Ramesh must realise that style without substance will never work." A critic from the Supergoodmovies website reviewed and gave a rating of 2/5 for the film, and said that Shadow "is a below average film. Here Meher Ramesh Direction, Screen Play and Story are bad. It is not a worthy flick." Cherukuri Raja from the Apherald website reviewed and gave a rating of 1.5/5 for the film and said, "Biggest Disaster of this Summer, dont waste your bucks on this flick."

=== Box office ===
The film collected a worldwide share of ₹11.5 crore in its full run.

==== India ====
The film collected ₹3.75 crore (37.5 m)in the first day in Andhra Pradesh.

==== Overseas ====
Trade analyst Taran Adarsh tweeted that this film collected $22,968 (₹1.25 million) in two days in the US.

==== Home media ====
The VCDs, DVDs and Blu-rays of the film were released through the Company BhavaniDVD on 12 July 2013.
