= Vaan Moondru =

- Theatrical release poster
- Directed by: A.M.R.Murugesh
- Produced by: Vinothkumar Senniappan
- Starring: Delhi Ganesh; Leela Samson; Vinoth Kishan; Abhirami Venkatachalam; Adithya Bhaskar; Ammu Abhirami
- Cinematography: Charles Thomas
- Edited by: Ajay Manoj
- Music by: R2bros
- Release date: 11 August 2023
- Country: India
- Language: Tamil

Vaan Moondru is a 2023 Indian Tamil-language film directed by A. M. R. Murugesh and starring Delhi Ganesh, Leela Samson and Vinoth Kishan in the lead roles. It was released on 11 August 2023.

== Cast ==
- Delhi Ganesh as Sivan
- Leela Samson as Chitra
- Vinoth Kishan as Joshua
- Abhirami Venkatachalam as Jothi
- Adithya Bhaskar as Sujith
- Ammu Abhirami as Swathi

== Production ==
The makers initially contemplated an English title, before settling for Vaan Moondru.

== Reception ==
The film was released on 11 August 2023 via a streaming platform. A reviewer from the portal OTTPlay noted the film was "a harmless feel-good film that relies on sincere performances from lead actors". A reviewer from Deccan Chronicle wrote "throughout the movie, the director tries to drive home the point that life can be started afresh even when the past has been very hard on you". Subashree Dutta of the LeisureByte wrote "the movie relies more on your ability to perceive than on evoking emotions using the storyline. But thanks to the actors, the movie is convenient to watch". A critic from Vikatan gave the film a middling review.
