= Oh My Dog =

2022 Tamil film

- Film Poster
- Directed by: Sarov Shanmugam
- Written by: Sarov Shanmugam
- Produced by: Suriya; Jyothika
- Starring: Arun Vijay; Arnav Vijay; Vinay Rai; Mahima Nambiar
- Cinematography: S. Gopinath
- Edited by: Meghanathan
- Music by: Nivas K. Prasanna
- Production company: 2D Entertainment
- Distributed by: Amazon Prime Video
- Release date: 21 April 2022
- Country: India
- Language: Tamil

Oh My Dog is a 2022 Indian Tamil-language children's comedy drama film written and directed by debutant Sarov Shanmugam. Produced by Suriya and Jyothika under the 2D Entertainment banner, the film stars Arun Vijay and his son Arnav Vijay in his debut with Vinay Rai, Mahima Nambiar and Vijayakumar in the supporting roles. The film's music and score are composed by Nivas K. Prasanna, with cinematography handled by Gopinath and editing done by Meghanathan. The film was released on the digital streaming platform Amazon Prime Video on 21 April 2022.

== Plot ==
The story takes place in Tamilnadu, where Arjun lives with his parents, Shankar and Priya, as well as his paternal grandfather, Shanmugam. Arjun takes a liking to animals. Fernando Lee is the owner of many dogs and has won the International Dog Competition six years in a row. Fernando wants to have the best dogs so he can use them during competitions, so when his Siberian Husky gives birth to a blind puppy, he orders his henchmen to kill the puppy on the outskirts of the city and bury it. His henchmen fail to do so, as the puppy flees and successfully escapes from them. Fernando's henchmen lie to him, stating they killed the puppy, however, they have the constant fear that Fernando will eventually find out.

Shankar, struggles to pay the mortgage loan on their house. As a result, Shanmugam criticise him for paying for Arjun's school fees instead of their house fees. Arjun accidentally discovers the puppy and cleans it himself. He begs his mother to keep the puppy, but his mother doesn't allow him and forces him home. That next morning, the puppy used his scent to go to Arjun's bedside and wake him up. Arjun, feeling pity for the puppy, decides to raise the puppy without his family's consent. For an entire week, he hides the puppy in his home. He takes the puppy to school, although it is prohibited. His classmates adore the puppy, which Arjun names the puppy Simba (after The Lion King). Fernando's henchmen realise that Arjun has the puppy and try different techniques to take it back and kill Simba, all in vain. Eventually, the principal finds out with the help of PT Master Swaminathan, and Shankar is informed. Shankar is given the last warning. Shankar angrily throws away Simba and angrily confronts Arjun about it. Arjun develops a fever due to Simba's departure. Priya convinces Shankar to take back Simba, saying that during Simba's stay, Arjun was being well-behaved.

Shankar and Arjun go looking for Simba, but they are kicked out due to a bear roaming the area. A nightmare Arjun has where Simba is eaten by the bear causes him to leave the house alone at night and look for Simba. Shankar and Priya realise Arjun is missing and go looking for him. They luckily find him with Simba. The family happily adopts Simba, however, Shanmugam dislikes the presence of Simba. Arjun learns that a local hospital could cure Simba's blindness for 2 lakhs. He and his classmates start raising money for his surgery. Although they are unsuccessful, they learn about the International Dog Competition happening in Coimbatore, offering a 2 lakhs winning prize. Arjun signs up for the competition with the help of his father. He wins third place in the first challenge. Simba and Arjun slowly start making their way to the finals.

Simba, however, gets successfully kidnapped by Fernando's henchmen but gets saved by Arjun. Fernando's henchmen chase after Arjun, who takes refuge in his friend Ladoo's home. When the henchmen barge in, they are confronted by Ladoo's father, who is a police officer. They get imprisoned for six months. During those six months, Simba makes his way to the finals, and as Simba grows, so does his intelligence. Arjun hears about a Russian doctor in the area, who's offering to do the surgery. Shankar goes, believing it is a free treatment, but refuses when he realises it costs money. The Russian doctor kindly does the treatment for free, and Simba cures his blindness. This helps Simba get into the finals, and Fernando fears that he may have tough competition that year. Fernando goes to Shankar's house and offers to buy Simba in exchange for Shankar's mortgage loan being paid. Shankar refuses, but Shanmugam is angry with that decision. Shankar loses a lot of money shortly after and fears he could lose his house. He goes to Shanmugam defeated, feeling like he failed as a son. Shanmugam suggests that maybe selling Simba would've been a good idea.

Shanmugam experiences a heart attack in the middle of the night, only to be saved by Simba, who warned the entire family. Shanmugam recovers, but the remorseful Arjun explains that there is an entry fee for the final dog competition, which Shankar can't pay due to his situation. Shanmugam has a change of heart and offers to pay using his Old Age Security. Fernando learns that Simba was blind-born and realises it might have been his dog. He punishes his henchmen and learns that Simba had just got eye surgery, but this could be disrupted by flashing lights. Fernando causes the stage lights to malfunction and flash, which causes Simba to once again be blind. During the finals, the judges don't allow Simba in due to a policy that says blind dogs are unable to participate. But with the help of Shankar and the audience, Simba is able to get into the game and set a new world record (winning the competition and breaking Fernando's record). Arjun accidentally eavesdrops and hears Fernando demanding the medal be given to him or else he will kill Simba. Arjun gives Fernando his dog, as a result, pleading not to kill it and asking the host to crown Fernando as the winner. Fernando realises his mistake and exposes himself in front of the audience, giving the award and Simba back to Arjun, claiming Arjun is the true winner. Shanmugam expresses that Shankar is the greatest father anyone could have. The family pays the mortgage loans as well as the school fees. Eventually, the family lives happily ever after.

== Cast ==
- Arun Vijay as Shankar
- Arnav Vijay as Arjun
- Vinay Rai as Fernando Lee
- Mahima Nambiar as Priya
- Vijayakumar as Shanmugam, Shankar's father
- Bhanu Chander as Nassar
- Swaminathan as the PT master
- Manobala as the Police inspector
- Priyadarshini Rajkumar as School principal
- A. Venkatesh as Moneylender
- Mippu as Fernando's henchman
- Gouri Sankar Krishna Moorthy as Fernando's brother

== Soundtrack ==
The film’s music was composed by Nivas K. Prasanna.

Oh My Dog

Soundtrack album by Nivas K. Prasanna
- Released: 2022
- Genre: Feature film soundtrack
- Length: 14:17
- Language: Tamil
- Label: Sony Music South
- Producer: Nivas K. Prasanna

Nivas K. Prasanna chronology
Kodiyil Oruvan (2021)	Oh My Dog (2022)	Vattam (2022)

Track listing
No.	Title	Lyrics	Singer(s)	Length
1.	"Engirundho Vandhaan"	Mahakavi Bharathi, A. Mohan Rajan	Nivas K. Prasanna, Pradeep Kumar, Brindha Sivakumar	5:13
2.	"I'm A Fighter"	M. K. Balaji	Nivas K. Prasanna, MK Balaji, Yuvan Shankar Raja	4:10
3.	"It’s My Kinda Day"	Super Subu	Ajeesh Sivakumar	4:54
4.	"Kids Chorus"		Kathirmadhi, Ishaan Suresh, Sibani Suresh, H. Abhinav, V. G. Yuvalakshmi, P. Amrish
5.	"With You"	Saras Menon (English), Super Subu (Tamil)	Kathirmadhi, Ishaan Suresh, Sibani Suresh, H. Abhinav, V. G. Yuvalakshmi, P. Amrish
Total length:				14:17

== Release ==
Oh My Dog was released directly on Amazon prime video on 21 April 2022 as a part of 2D Entertainment's four-film deal with the streaming service.

== Release and reception ==
Oh My Dog was released directly on Amazon Prime Video on 21 April 2022. Logesh Balachandran, critic from The Times of India, noted that "Oh My Dog! is not a painful watch. Kids might enjoy the film, but its universal theme could have been portrayed in a better way" and gave 2.5 stars out of 5 stars. Hindustan Times critic gave a mixed review and noted that "Shanmugam['s] debut movie is a warm and cute tale of a boy and his dog. Though not without a few flaws, it will appeal to kids and grown ups alike". Manoj Kumar R, critic from The Indian Express gave 3 stars out of 5 and noted that " This is not just about an abandoned puppy finding love. It is about a band of people, traditionally considered weak who stand up for themselves and stick it to the big guy."
