= The Akaali =

- Theatrical release poster
- Directed by: Mohamed Asif Hameed
- Written by: Mohamed Asif Hameed
- Produced by: Ukeshvaraan Prabhu
- Starring: Nassar; Thalaivasal Vijay; Jayakumar Janakiraman; Vinoth Kishan; Swayam Siddha
- Cinematography: Giri Murphy
- Edited by: Iniyavan Pandiyan
- Music by: Anish Mohan
- Production company: PBS Productions
- Release date: 31 May 2024
- Country: India
- Language: Tamil

The Akaali is a 2024 Indian Tamil-language horror thriller film written and directed by Mohamed Asif Hameed in his debut. The film stars Nassar, Thalaivasal Vijay, Jayakumar Janakiraman, Vinoth Kishan and Swayam Siddha. The film was produced by Ukeshvaraan Prabhu under the banner of PBS Productions, and had a theatrical release on 31 May 2024.

== Plot ==
A newly appointed I.O. finds herself digging into the past regarding a 7-year-old case where occult gangs and forces have been responsible for a series of satanic killings in the city. With the help of an ex-cop, can she solve the case?

== Cast ==
- Nassar as Donald Halloway
- Thalaivasal Vijay as Sundaramoorthy
- Jayakumar Janakiraman as Hamza Rahman
- Vinoth Kishan as Vincent
- Swayam Siddha as Sowmya Dev Varma
- Arjai as Selvam
- Lawrence
- Harris Moosa
- Vinothini
- Sekar
- Aarthi
- Afsal Hussain
- Maisha Shabeer
- Yamini
- Elavarasan
- Dharani Reddy
- Vignesh
- Sabir Ali
- Bharath
- Sundari
- Lasya

== Production ==
The film is the directorial debut of Mohamed Asif Hameed. The cinematography was by handled by Giri Murphy, and the editing by Iniyavan Pandiyan.

== Reception ==
Sreejith Mullappilly of Cinema Express rated the film two stars out of five and wrote, "The film is full of excess but is made with such passion that you wish it were slick enough to be a fun romp [...] The heavy-handed approach to storytelling, with all the expository passages, is such a dampener". Manigandan KR of Times Now wrote, "The Akaali is likely to appeal to only those who really like serious, dark horror stories. Even such people will have to make a serious and significant effort to comprehend and understand the plot in its entirety."
