= Vaamanan =

- Theatrical release poster
- Directed by: I. Ahmed
- Written by: I. Ahmed
- Produced by: R. Ravindran
- Starring: Jai; Rahman; Priya Anand; Lakshmi Rai
- Cinematography: Arvind Krishna
- Edited by: S. Surajkavee
- Music by: Yuvan Shankar Raja
- Production company: Dream Valley Corporation
- Release date: 10 July 2009
- Running time: 139 minutes
- Country: India
- Language: Tamil

Vaamanan is a 2009 Indian Tamil-language action thriller film written and directed by I. Ahmed in his directorial debut, and produced by Dream Valley Corporation. The film stars Jai, Rahman, Priya Anand, Lakshmi Rai, and Santhanam, while Urvashi, Sampath Raj, and Thalaivasal Vijay play supporting roles. It revolves around a man who comes to Chennai to pursue an acting career, but instead becomes embroiled in a political conspiracy.

Vaamanan is the directorial debut of Ahmed, and also marks Priya Anand's acting debut. The score and soundtrack were by Yuvan Shankar Raja, while cinematography was handled by Arvind Krishna and editing by S. Surajkavee. The film was released on 10 July 2009.

== Plot ==
Anand is a carefree man from Salem who comes to Chennai to stay with his TV journalist friend Chandru to pursue his dream to become an actor with the help from his new girlfriend Divya and Chandru. Meanwhile, Minister Viduthalai, who was touted to become the next chief minister of Tamil Nadu, is killed by Minister Anbu Chezhiyan and his goons, which accidentally gets recorded on the tape of an ad film director named Vinoth. Soon, Anand befriends a famous model Pooja, who is also a friend of Vinoth. Vinoth and Pooja see the video of the murder and inform the joint commissioner Kailasam, who they come to know is also a hand-in-glove in the murder. Kailasam sends some goons to get the tape, and Vinoth manages to evade them initially. After a long chase, Vinoth gets killed in the train where Anand and Divya were travelling. Anand, having witnessed the murder, places the tape into Divya's bag, which she misses in the train. Anand then develops a friendship with her after this.

Anand, in an urge to become an actor, observes the character of people with a strange attitude. One such person is John Vijay. Anand joins John, who, in turn, promises to make him an actor. John takes Anand to a stranger's home and does things as if they were thieves. One such house was that of Pooja, where they go and get information regarding her. On that eve, Anand befriends Pooja when he saves her when she was lying in a pool of blood after being attacked by goons. She helps him become an actor and asks for some photos of his to get him a chance. When Anand goes to Pooja's home, he finds her dead and is put to blame as he was the one present.

At last, it is known that John has used Anand and had also committed this cold-blooded murder. However, Kailasam is after Anand and the tape, and finally, Anand, on seeing Vinoth's photo in Pooja's house reminds himself that the tape was accidentally put in Divya's handbag in the train at the scene of Vinoth's murder. Anand immediately goes to Divya's house and is initially mistaken by Divya and her mother. He calms them down and explains to them that Vinoth and Pooja were killed because of minister Viduthalai's murder getting recorded on their tape, which accidentally ended up in Divya's handbag at the scene of Vinoth's murder. Both Divya and her mother now realise that Anand is really innocent when Divya gives Anand the tape, which eventually falls into the right hands, that of Gopi, Vinoth and Pooja's media friend, who obtains and publicises it. In the end, John, Anbu Chezhiyan, and Kailasam are all killed, and Anand has become a real hero instead of an acting hero.

== Cast ==
- Jai as Anand
- Rahman as John Vijay
- Priya Anand as Divya (voice dubbed by Savitha Reddy)
- Lakshmi Rai as Pooja
- Santhanam as Chandru
- Urvashi as Divya's mother
- Sampath Raj as Minister Anbu Chezhiyan
- Thalaivasal Vijay as Commissioner Kailasam
- Delhi Ganesh as Minister Viduthalai
- Rohini as Rohini
- Gopinath as Gopinath
- R. Ravindran as Mukhil

== Production ==
Vaamanan is the directorial debut of I. Ahmed. He chose to cast Jai as the lead actor after being impressed with his performance in Chennai 600028 (2007), and though the actor was committed to Subramaniapuram (2008), Ahmed decided to wait till he was available. The film was launched on 10 September 2008 at Krishnaveni House, Chennai. Jai would reportedly receive ₹60 lakh (equivalent to ₹1.6 crore or US$170,000 in 2026), an increase from the ₹20 lakh (equivalent to ₹55 lakh or US$57,000 in 2026) he received for his last film before Subramaniapuram, his breakthrough. Priya Anand made her acting debut with this film. Filming locations included Chennai, Hyderabad, Bangkok, Malaysia and Singapore. A radio-controlled helicopter was used for filming. The film carries a special thanks in the title card to the actor Ajith Kumar, who assisted in helping fix a problem encountered with the helicopter.

== Soundtrack ==
The soundtrack album of Vaamanan, composed by Yuvan Shankar Raja, was released on 9 April 2009 at Sathyam Cinemas in Chennai. The lyrics were written by Na. Muthukumar. The song "Aedho Saigirai" became amongst the year's most popular Tamil film songs. Pavithra Srinivasan of Rediff.com wrote, "Yuvan is fast becoming one of those music directors who have evolved a template of their stock tunes and borrow liberally from oft-repeated melodies. Vaamanan is one such album in which he has not offered anything new".

All lyrics are written by Na. Muthukumar; all music is composed by Yuvan Shankar Raja.

Track listing
No.	Title	Singer(s)	Length
1.	"Lucky Star"	Blaaze, SuVi, Mohammed Aslam	4:14
2.	"Money Money"	DJ Earl, Preethi	4:28
3.	"Aedho Saigirai"	Javed Ali, Sowmya Raoh	4:50
4.	"Oru Devathai"	Roopkumar Rathod	4:56
5.	"Enge Povadhu"	Vijay Yesudas	3:55
Total length:			22:23

== Controversy ==
In March 2009, Jai elicited controversy for making comments about the potential box office fare of his future films. The actor, who was filming for Vaamanan, Aval Peyar Thamizharasi, Adhe Neram Adhe Idam and Arjunan Kadhali at the time, claimed that only Vaamanan would succeed and the others would fail. Some of the producers of the films wanted to take action against Jai for "making such irresponsible and damaging statements about his own films". Initially, the Tamil Film Producers Council asked him to complete his pending assignments before he could start work on Venkat Prabhu's Goa, but, the producer of that film, Soundarya Rajinikanth, intervened and bailed Jai out of the ban.

== Critical reception ==
Malathi Rangarajan of The Hindu wrote, "Despite its share of improbabilities, if Vaamanan (U/A) manages to impact the viewer to a certain extent it is mainly because of the raciness in the last lap". Pavithra Srinivasan of Rediff.com wrote, "If only they'd taken up where the script lets off at the intermission, and made it tauter, racier, and with at least a sprinkling of logic". Sify wrote, "What could have been an edge-of-the-seat crime thriller falls flat in the second half due to lack of a proper script and far too many compromises made by the director". Chennai Online wrote, "Debutant director Ahmed’s tries to show an ordinary man rising to the occasion and tame the bad elements. The idea is ok even though it is not a new theme for Tamil cinema. How he has managed to execute this idea is what we have to ponder over".
