= Serndhu Polama =

2015 Indian film by Anil Kumar

- Promotional poster
- Directed by: Anil Kumar
- Written by: Ravi Mathew
- Produced by: Sasi Nambeesan
- Starring: Vinay; Madhurima; Preethi
- Cinematography: Sanjeev Shankar
- Edited by: Arju Benn
- Music by: Vishnu Mohan
- Production company: Aiswarya Entertainments
- Distributed by: Dream Factory
- Release date: 6 March 2015
- Country: India
- Language: Tamil

Serndhu Polama (transl. Shall We Go Together?) is a 2015 Tamil-language romantic musical film directed by Anil Kumar and produced by Sasi Nambeesan. The film stars Vinay, Madhurima and Preethi Christina Paul in the lead roles. The music was composed by Vishnu Mohan. The film was released on 6 March 2015.

== Plot ==
The movie starts off with Kumaran (Thambi Ramaiah) telling his wife that he is going to a temple. Actually, he spends two days of each month with women he meets on the Internet. His old-fashioned wife does not suspect anything. While Kumaran is driving, he finds Abhishek (Vinay) unconscious on the road. Abhishek then tells his story to Kumaran on how he ended up on the road.

Abhishek is a disheveled photographer who meets up with his friend, who is a florist. There, he sees Julie (Preethi Christina), who is shopping and is in a hurry. She asks Abhishek to drive her around for the day for $500. He agrees and borrows his friend's car for the day. At the end of the day, Julie invites him, a man she has no clue about, into her house and asks him to make coffee. While he is making coffee, she gets dressed and asks him to zip her dress up for her.

It is revealed that Julie wants to be a model for Vogue magazine and was meant to be meeting a famous fashion photographer for an opportunity. She then instructs Abhishek to drive to the photographer's house. Once they reach their destination, Abhishek reveals that he is the well-known photographer that she was going to see. They fall in love. A montage song shows them travelling together all over New Zealand. Julie's parents find out, and as they do not approve of their relationship, they decide to get her married by force.

Meanwhile, Abhishek's childhood friend Sherin (Madhurima) sees a picture in an art gallery and tells the manager about Abhishek, his friends, and her childhood. Sherin spots a heartbroken and drunk Abhishek in a bar and escorts him to a hotel. There are some awkward circumstances between them, but Abhishek tells her full story once he is sober. Sherin talks about her dead brother's murder that happened in their "secret place" and pretends to help Abhishek get Julie back. However, Sherin is convinced that Abhishek murdered her brother because he was the last person to see him at the secret place and wants to avenge him.

The story cuts back to the present day, where Kumaran is seen together in bed with a woman and leaves hurriedly when her husband returns. Sherin and Abhishek try to find Julie, but they are in no hurry. Sherin then meets Julie and tells Abishek to forget her.

== Cast ==
- Vinay as Abhishek
- Nyra Banerjee as Sherin
- Preethi Christina Paul as Julie
- Thambi Ramaiah as Kumaran
- Thalaivasal Vijay as Grandpa
- Nandu as Tony
- Arun Sasitharan as Thomas
- Anju Kurian as herself in the promotional song "Bun Butter Jam"

== Production ==
In September 2013, the producers revealed that they had signed on Malayalam director Anil Kumar and actors Vinay and Preethi Christina paul to work on their debut production. Pre-production work for the film began in November 2013, with director Anil Kumar flying out to New Zealand to scout locations. The film was officially launched in January 2014 at a temple in Ormiston, Auckland with the producers holding auditions for local actors from New Zealand to join the cast soon after. In early 2014, the team shot a schedule in New Zealand for nearly fifty days with reports suggesting that the director and lead actress, Madhurima, had fallen out during the making of the venture. Anil Kumar admitted that he thus subsequently chose to extend the role of another actress Preethi Paul in the film, revealing he added an extra song which had not been planned.

== Reception ==
A critic from The New Indian Express wrote that "Serndhu Polama is at the most a sight-seeing trip of New Zealand for the viewers. If only the exotic locations were backed by a sound and solid script". A critic from The Times of India wrote that "Even at two hours, the film proves to be a tiresome watch that numbs our sense that we start wishing it was titled Sorndhu Ponome!" (transl. We went together)
