= Endrendrum Punnagai =

2013 Indian film by I. Ahmed

- Theatrical release poster
- Directed by: I. Ahmed
- Written by: I. Ahmed
- Produced by: G. K. M. Tamil Kumaran
- Starring: Jiiva; Trisha; Vinay; Santhanam; Andrea Jeremiah; Nassar
- Cinematography: R. Madhi
- Edited by: Praveen K. L. N. B. Srikanth
- Music by: Harris Jayaraj
- Production company: Tamil Kumaran Productions Pvt Ltd
- Distributed by: Red Giant Movies
- Release date: 20 December 2013
- Running time: 152 minutes
- Country: India
- Language: Tamil

Endrendrum Punnagai (transl. Everlasting smile) is a 2013 Indian Tamil-language romantic comedy drama film written and directed by I. Ahmed starring Jiiva, Trisha, Vinay, Santhanam, Andrea Jeremiah and Nassar. The film has music by Harris Jayaraj and cinematography by R. Madhi. The film was launched officially in Chennai on 29 June 2012. Upon its release on 20 December 2013, the film received positive reviews from critics and became a commercial success. The film's title is based on a song from Alai Payuthey (2000).

== Plot ==
The movie starts with Goutham, as a child, being told that women are all bad and are very selfish by his father Sridhar because his wife had eloped that day. They then move to Chennai, where Goutham meets Sri Harsha and Baby. The trio became inseparable friends. 15 years later, they are running an advertising agency and Goutham has stopped speaking to his father. After a heated incident at a friend's bachelor party, the three friends promise to never get married. They get an advertising offer from Sunny, who sends Priya to assist them with the ad. Sonia, an international model, is assigned to act for the ad. On the day of the shoot, Sonia falls in love with Goutham, and when the ad is finished, she bites his ear. Goutham retaliates by slapping her. Sunny scolds Goutham and tells him that he will never work with him again, but Priya supports Goutham, telling Sunny that it was Sonia's fault for behaving unprofessionally. After the shoot, Goutham calls up Priya and thanks her for supporting him. While speaking to Goutham, Priya meets with an accident. He rushes her to the hospital, where she recovers the next day.

After a few days, Baby and Sri decide to marry. This infuriates Goutham when he learns of it and ends their friendship. On the same day of the marriage, Sridhar tells Priya that he got married for the second time after many years before for Goutham's sake and that was the reason for Goutham's anger towards him. He requests that Priya take care of Goutham. Goutham and Priya get another contract with Sunny and Sonia, and they leave for Switzerland for the shooting. On the day of the shooting, Sonia recalls everything Goutham had done and asks him to apologise for his act. He refuses because he knows that it is not his fault and then tells Sonia to leave. Afterwards, Priya takes on the role of Sonia and acts for the advertisement. During the shooting, Priya and Goutham fall in love. When they come back from Switzerland, Goutham meets his friend and introduces Priya as just a stranger whom he met on the flight. Hurt by Goutham's cheap behaviour, she leaves the airport. Goutham after returning home, calls Priya and asks her to return the watch that he gave her when they were abroad. Hurt further, Priya reaches Goutham's office the next day and returns his watch. Before leaving, Priya informs Goutham to contact Sunny in the future, indicating that she doesn't want to interact with Goutham any more. Later, Sunny and Goutham discuss the remaining work on the project and during the discussion Sunny informs that Priya will marry her friend working in the US. Sunny further adds that he knows the feeling between Priya and Goutham and advises Goutham not to cheat himself. Goutham meets Priya at a beach and there quoting the airport incident, Priya tells Goutham that he is too egoistic that he will hurt anyone to maintain his macho image. She further tells him that due to his ego he has stopped talking to his father and friends who are very close to him and she can't afford to live with him since she knows that he will stop talking to her even if there is a small misunderstanding between them. After saying this, Priya leaves and Goutham starts feeling guilty and realises all his mistake.

When Goutham returns home, he goes into his father's room and notices many paintings of him being happy, his father's wish. Goutham then discovers that his father is ill and rushes him to the hospital, where the doctors say that his father is suffering from pancreatic cancer and cannot be treated. Goutham feels heartbroken. Sri comes to meet him and tells him that he knew that Sridhar was suffering from this disease. Baby then comes and says that Sridhar was the one who compelled them to get married so that Goutham might change his mind and get married. As the three friends reconcile, Priya comes to the hospital to meet Sridhar, where Gautham apologises and admits to Priya that he has fallen for her. The film ends with Gautham and Priya getting engaged in front of a recovering Sridhar at the hospital.

== Cast ==
- Jiiva as Goutham Sridhar
- Trisha as Priya (Voice dubbed by Chinmayi)
- Vinay as Sri Harshan
- Santhanam as Baby
- Andrea Jeremiah as Sonia
- Nassar as Sridhar
- T. M. Karthik as Sunny
- Jagan as Jackson, Sonia's manager
- Abhinay as Karthik
- Sriranjani as Gowri, Priya's mother
- Sanjana Sarathy as Divya, Priya's younger sister
- Varsha Ashwathi as Swetha, Sri Harshan's wife
- Tanuja Babu as Sunitha, Baby's wife
- Balaji Venugopal as Balaji, Goutham, Sri's and Baby's friend
- Narayan Lucky as Narayanan, Goutham, Sri's and Baby's friend
- Swaminathan as Somasundaram, Sri's uncle
- Lollu Sabha Manohar as Current
- 'Lollu Sabha' Easter as Current 's assistant
- Supergood Subramani as Police Inspector
- Lingesh as Drunkard

Uncredited

- R. Dharshan as Current's storyteller
- Raju Sundaram in a special appearance in the song "Ennatha Solla"

== Production ==
The film was launched officially in Chennai on 29 June 2012. Lisa Haydon who had been approached for a role in this film, was no longer doing that role due to date clashes. Andrea Jeremiah took up the role. Sivakarthikeyan was initially cast in the film but was later replaced by Vinay Rai, prompting the director to make some changes to script to suit Vinay's urban image. The film was shot in various locations including Seychelles and Switzerland.

== Soundtrack ==
Music was composed by Harris Jayaraj scoring for a Jiiva film for the third time after Ko and Nanban. The soundtrack album consists of 6 tracks. Harris Jayaraj and the director headed to Turkey for composing sessions. 2 songs for the film were recorded by early May 2012. A single track titled "Vaan Engum Nee Minna" was released on 18 October. The album was released by Kamal Haasan on 24 October 2013 at Sathyam Cinemas, and within 24 hours of its release on the net, topped the iTunes India Charts.

Track listing
No.	Title	Lyrics	Singers	Length
1.	"Vaan Engum Nee Minna"	Madhan Karky	Aalap Raju, Harini, Devan Ekambaram, Pravin Saivi	04:26
2.	"Yealae Yealae Dosthu Da"	Viveka	Krish, Naresh Iyer, Krishna Iyer	05:43
3.	"Ennai Saaithaalae"	Thamarai	Hariharan, Shreya Ghoshal	05:29
4.	"Othayilae"	Kabilan	Tippu, Abhay Jodhpurkar	04:14
5.	"Ennatha Solla"	Viveka	Karthik, Haricharan, Velmurugan, Ramesh Vinayakam	05:50
6.	"Kadal Naan Thaan"	Vaali	Sudha Ragunathan, Suzanne D'Mello, MK Balaji	05:10
Total length:				30:52

== Release ==
Endrendrum Punnagai was given a U/A certificate by the Censor Board due to "a few adult comedy scenes". The film was released worldwide on 20 December 2013, clashing with Biriyani and the Hindi film Dhoom 3. It was distributed by Red Giant Movies in Tamil Nadu. Despite its lacklustre opening at the box office, the film picked up during its second week due to favourable word of mouth, and was considered a sleeper hit by the trade.

== Critical reception ==
Sify wrote, "It's a [feel-good] breezy entertainer and it's got its heart in the right place" and the film "works big time due to director Ahmed's well- written script which encompass friendship, romance and an emotional father-son angle which has been handled sensitively". Sudhish Kamath of The Hindu wrote, "The first half is largely fun and jokes and the film gently breezes along, thanks to the bonding and chemistry between the guys. The problem with Endrendrum Punnagai is that it takes itself a tad too seriously instead of living up to the title and keeping it light. There's just too much drama...clichés employed to infuse drama into the sluggish second half that is further burdened with songs".

S. Viswanath of Deccan Herald wrote, "Endrendrum Punnagai is no great shakes as ensemble entertainer. It does have its moments. Beginning on a breezy note, it peters out into a languid tale in the latter half. With a plot as predictable as chicory coffee, especially after friction among friends Endrendrum Punnagai does not turn out everlasting happiness as its title suggests". Gautaman Bhaskaran of Hindustan Times gave 1.5 stars and wrote, "Endrendrum Punnagai is predictable piece of a movie where we know what would happen when Trisha Krishnan's Priya walks into the lives of the three men as a project consultant for an ad film being made by them. It is bad enough that much of Tamil cinema is clocked in clichés and crassness. What is worse is that it continues to handle actors with immense potential with utter callousness".
