= Vinay Rai =

Indian actor

- Born: 18 September 1979 (age 47); Bombay (now Mumbai), Maharashtra, India
- Occupation: Actor
- Years active: 2007–present

Vinay Rai (born 18 September 1979) is an Indian actor who primarily appears in Tamil films apart from a few Telugu, Malayalam films and has appeared in one English film. He is best known for his performance in the films Unnale Unnale (2007), Jayamkondaan (2008), Endrendrum Punnagai (2013) and Aranmanai (2014). He turned villain in Thupparivaalan (2017) and has played negative roles in several films including Doctor (2021), Etharkkum Thunindhavan (2022), Oh My Dog (2022) Christopher (2023), Veeran (2023), Gandeevadhari Arjuna (2023), Hanu-Man (2024), and Identity (2025).

== Early life ==
Vinay was born to a Tulu-speaking family, and originally was a commercial model in Mumbai. He played rugby for BRFC and was part of the Indian squad that toured Bahrain in 2001.

== Career ==
=== 2007–2009: Debut and lead roles ===
He debuted as an actor in director Jeeva's Unnale Unnale (2007) co-starring Sadha and Tanisha Mukherjee. The film became a huge success upon release and brought in more acting offers for Vinay. He was supposed to play the lead role in Gandhi Krishna's Ananda Thandavam but was later replaced by newcomer Siddharth Venugopal.

Since his debut film, he has appeared in a Telugu language film, Vaana (2008), which flopped at the box-office and it was dubbed in Tamil as Gnabagangal Thalattum in 2013. Despite getting offers to act in romance films, Vinay stayed away from them and he stated that he didn't want to be stereotyped as a "chocolate boy". His second Tamil film Jayamkondaan (2008) was commercially and critically successful. Playing the role of an NRI civil engineer who returned to Chennai to set up his own business, his performance fetched positive reviews with a reviewer citing that "Vinay, as the protagonist is very comfortable in his role. He has expressive eyes, emotes well, and makes sure his audience isn't disappointed". In 2009, he starred in Saran's Modhi Vilayadu for which he dubbed in his own voice for the first time. The film, starring Kajal Aggarwal and Kalabhavan Mani, opened to mixed reviews from critics and became a box office failure. Two of his films including Veelle and Nootruku Nooru were shelved because the production companies went broke.

=== 2011–2015 : Experimentations and comedy roles ===
He made a comeback in 2011 with a role in the English film, Dam 999, which had a poor commercial and critical response. The next year, Vinay appeared in the action comedy film Mirattal (2012), remake of the Telugu film Dhee (2007). The film, which starred Sharmila Mandre opposite him, got an average response. Vinay's performances received favourable reviews, with a reviewer citing that "Vinay Rai looks comfortable in his role and dishes out a neat performance". In 2013, he appeared in P. T. Selvakumar's comedy film Onbadhule Guru. Upon release, the film was panned by the critics but was commercially successful at the box office. The same year, he played a supporting role in the comedy-drama film Endrendrum Punnagai co-starring Jiiva and Trisha. Upon release, the film won positive reviews citing that the film was "worth a watch" and a critic stated, "Vinay performs with no inhibitions in all his portions, be it comedy, dance or the emotional scenes and this film will prove to be a good vehicle for him to reach a larger audience". Vinay then acted in the horror comedy film Aranmanai (2014) directed by Sundar C which turned out to be a blockbuster. His next release was Serndhu Polama (2015), co-starring Nyra Banerjee and Preethi Christina Paul, and directed by Malayalam film director Anil. The film, entirely shot in New Zealand, was released to negative reviews.

=== 2017–present: Character roles ===
In 2017, he played a negative character in the crime thriller Thupparivaalan directed by Mysskin. The film opened to positive reviews with a critic from Sify claiming that "Vinay Rai as the ruthless baddie is a revelation". The same year, Vinay played a dual role in the long-delayed film Aayirathil Iruvar again with Saran. The film opened to negative reviews with a critic from IndiaGlitz stating, "Vinay who just impressed with his heartless killer in Thupparivaalan can forget Aayirathil Iruvar in a hurry as both his characters are written wafer thin with no underlying subtext for him to score".

His next venture Nethraa (2019) was a thriller film directed by A. Venkatesh co-starring Thaman Kumar and Subiksha. The film, which was extensively shot in Canada, opened to negative critical response upon release. In 2021, his films were Iruvar Ullam that was delayed after years and Nelson's action comedy, Doctor opposing the actor Sivakarthikeyan. Vinay Rai played the antagonist. Vinay Rai's performance adds to the tension created by the solid screenwriting and directing. He has also acted as the antagonist in Suriya’s film Etharkkum Thunindhavan directed by Pandiraj. He also playing a bad guy in Arun Vijay’s Oh My Dog produced by Suriya and Jyothika under the banner of 2D Entertainment. Then, Vinay Rai acted as in the horror thriller genre Connect with Nayanthara as doctor husband. Malayalam action thrillers like Christopher (2023), and Identity (2024), where he played a merciless villain, so much so that people would shudder at the very sight of him.

== Filmography ==
=== Films ===
Key
†	Denotes films that have not yet been released

Year	Title	Role(s)	Language	Notes	Ref.
2007	Unnale Unnale	Karthik	Tamil	Nominated, Vijay Award for Best Debut Actor	
2008	Vaana	Abhiram	Telugu		
2008	Jayamkondaan	Arjun Sekhar	Tamil		
2009	Modhi Vilayadu	Udhay Vasudev	Tamil		
2011	Dam 999	Vinay	English		
2012	Mirattal	Babloo	Tamil		
2013	Onbadhule Guru	Billa	Tamil		
2013	Endrendrum Punnagai	Sri Harshan	Tamil		
2014	Aranmanai	Murali	Tamil		
2015	Serndhu Polama	Abhishek	Tamil		
2017	Thupparivaalan	Devil / John Richardson Holcha	Tamil	Nominated, Filmfare Award for Best Supporting Actor – Tamil	
2017	Aayirathil Iruvar	Senthattikaalai and Sevathakaalai	Tamil	Dual role	
2019	Nethraa	Vikram	Tamil		
2021	Iruvar Ullam	Karthik Natarajan	Tamil	Delayed release; Filmed in 2012–13	
2021	Doctor	Terry	Tamil		
2022	Etharkkum Thunindhavan	Inbasekharan (Inba)	Tamil		
2022	Oh My Dog	Fernando	Tamil		
2022	Connect	Joseph Benoy	Tamil	Cameo appearance	
2023	Christopher	Sitaram Trimurthi	Malayalam		
2023	Veeran	Sarath	Tamil		
2023	Gandeevadhari Arjuna	Ranveer	Telugu		
2024	Hanu Man	Michael / Mega Man	Telugu		
2024	Eagle	Kali Pratap	Telugu		
2025	Identity	CI Allen Jacob	Malayalam		
2025	Kadhalikka Neramillai	Sethuraman	Tamil		
2025	Diesel	DCP Mayavel	Tamil		
2026	G.D.N	Bhupendra	Tamil		
TBA	Murder Live †	TBA	Tamil	Filming	
