= Aayirathil Iruvar =

- Theatrical release poster
- Directed by: Saran
- Written by: Saran
- Produced by: Subha Saran; Sankar Krishnamoorthy
- Starring: Vinay Rai; Sakshi Chaudhary; Surabhi Santosh; Kesha Khambhati
- Cinematography: Krishna Ramanan; Sathyan Sooryan
- Edited by: Prasanna GK
- Music by: Bharadwaj
- Production companies: Saran Movie Factory; Sankar K Praveen Films
- Release date: 22 September 2017
- Running time: 143 minutes
- Country: India
- Language: Tamil

Aayirathil Iruvar (transl. Two in a thousand) is a 2017 Indian Tamil-language action romance film written, directed and co-produced by Saran. The film stars Vinay Rai in dual lead roles and three newcomers, Sakshi Chaudhary, Surabhi Santosh and Kesha Khambhati, as the female leads, while the director's regular composer Bharadwaj scores the music. The film was primarily shot in Thirunelveli, shooting also took place in Hyderabad, Bangkok and Dubai. The film deals with the issue of money laundering and hawala. It began its production in December 2012 and went through several production delays, it finally released on 22 September 2017. It fared poorly at the box office.

== Cast ==
- Vinay Rai in a dual role as
  - Senthattikaalai
  - Sevathakaalai
- Sakshi Chaudhary as Adhirshtamalar
- Surabhi Santosh as Bhumika
- Kesha Khambhati as Urmila Naidu
- Pradeep Rawat as Bhima Raju
- Sreejith Ravi as Thilak Prabhu
- Kaajal Pasupathi as Arundhati
- Ilavarasu as Vanarajan
- Aruldoss as Mandhiramoorthy
- Rethika Srinivas
- Mayilsamy
- Daniel Annie Pope as Manish
- Shanoor Sana

== Production ==
In September 2012, it was first reported that Saran had stopped working on the pre-production of Aal, Ambu, Senai, a venture featuring Vishal and chosen to work on a script titled Senthatti Kaalai Sevatha Kaalai with Vinay in the lead role. The film was announced to be jointly produced by Vikram Raju for Vega Entertainment and Saran who would also work on the story, screenplay and direction. Bharadwaj, a regular in Saran's projects, was signed on to compose the music while three new girls called Samuthrika, Kadambari Jethwani and Shilpi Verma were signed on to play pivotal roles.

Production began in December 2012 in Thirunelveli, and posters from a photo shoot featuring Vinay in dual roles were released later in February 2013. Bharadwaj noted that the film was a musical, revealing he had composed six songs of usual length plus fifteen more of about thirty seconds length for scenes. However the film ran into troubles in 2013 and filming was postponed for the remainder of the year.

The team re-emerged and began production again in early January 2014, with Saran announcing that he had taken over the production and that new actresses Swasthika and Kesha Khambhati were also being introduced, in place of a couple of actresses who had been revealed earlier. In a press meet in August 2014, Saran announced that he had renamed two of the three female lead to avoid confusion with existing artistes. Hindi actress Sakshi Chaudhary became Samuthrika for Tamil films after impressing Saran at an audition, while Surabhi Santosh became Swasthika after Saran was impressed by a photograph. Supporting actress Rethika Srinivas, previously seen in Vazhakku Enn 18/9 (2012) and Nimirndhu Nil (2014), revealed that she would play a village character pitted against the two characters played by Vinay. She also revealed that the film's title had been changed to Aayirathil Iruvar and the team subsequently shot scenes in Tirunelveli. Besides Rethika, Sana and Kaajal Pasupathi were reported to play important roles. After three years of delays, the film was readied for release in September 2017 with the team heavily promoting Kaajal in the promotional posters, after she had gained fame through her appearance in Bigg Boss (2017).

== Soundtrack ==
Aayirathil Iruvar

Soundtrack album by Bharadwaj
- Released: 11 February 2015
- Length: 23:04
- Language: Tamil
- Label: Junglee Music
- Producer: Bharadwaj

Bharadwaj chronology
Azhagiya Pandipuram (2014)	Aayirathil Iruvar (2015)	Kalavaadiya Pozhuthugal (2017)

The film's music was composed by Bharadwaj, while the audio rights of the film was acquired by Junglee Music. The album released on 11 February 2015 with seven songs featuring lyrics by Vairamuthu, Kabilan Vairamuthu, Sreedevi and Saran.

Track list
No.	Title	Lyrics	Singer(s)	Length
1.	"Ammanae Ammanae"	Saran	Nivas, Vijaylakshmi, Priyaavishwa, Haritha	3:50
2.	"Ponna Pathi Sollava"	Vairamuthu	Karthik	4:27
3.	"Unnai Enni Enni Manasu"	Saran	M. K. Balaji	3:41
4.	"Manga Peesula Manga"	Kabilan Vairamuthu	Aravind, Deepika	4:01
5.	"Yen Uyirae Nee"	Saran	Akhila	1:32
6.	"Yelay Yelay"	Sreedevi	Sreedevi, Bharadwaj	3:48
7.	"Thirunelveli Thirunelveli"	Saran	Karpagam, Bharadwaj	1:45

== Release ==
The film's release was delayed for three years before makers readied the project for release in September 2017, following the publicity created by Vinay's appearance in Mysskin's crime thriller Thupparivaalan (2017). The film had a theatrical release on 22 September 2017 on the most crowded release date of the year at the Chennai box office, releasing alongside eight other films. Aayirathil Iruvar received negative reviews, with Sudhir Srinivasan of The New Indian Express writing it was an "all-round rotten drama" and adding "Aayirathil Iruvar is Tamil cinema's slap on every person who thinks film critics have an easy job”. A critic from Indiaglitz.com wrote "it is hard to believe that Saran has directed this mess" and that Vinay should "hope to forget this film in a hurry". Likewise, a reviewer from The Times of India wrote "to even attempt to describe the plot of Aayirathil Iruvar is enough to send one's head spinning, for writer-director Saran fills it with so many subplots that it is quite a wonder that the film makes some sense".
