= Kallattam =

2016 film by G. Ramesh

- Poster
- Directed by: G. Ramesh
- Produced by: G. Soundian; R. Prakash; G. Suman
- Starring: Nandha; Richard Rishi; Ilavarasu
- Cinematography: G. Ramesh
- Edited by: V. T. Vijayan-S. R. Ganesh Babu
- Music by: Umar Ezhilan
- Production company: White Horse Productions
- Release date: 30 September 2016
- Running time: 92 minutes
- Country: India
- Language: Tamil

Kallattam (transl. Foul Play) is a 2016 Indian Tamil-language action thriller film written and directed by G. Ramesh. The film features Nandha, Richard Rishi, and Ilavarasu in the lead roles, while Sharika, Arthi, and Baby Rethva Isvar play pivotal supporting roles. Featuring music composed by Umar Ezhilan, production for the film began in mid-2016. The narrative revolves around a police officer who sets out to help an unemployed man whose money needed for his daughter's operation gets stolen.

The film was released theatrically on 30 September 2016 and received negative reviews from critics who praised the performances but criticized the writing.

== Plot ==
Mahendran is an unemployed man whose daughter meets with an accident while being dropped to school. He admits her to Kaveri Hospital where he and his wife are told their daughter can be saved but they need to deposit 20 lakh rupees. He is told to register an FIR at the nearby police station, which he does with the help of a cop named Pazhani. A desperate Mahendran, along with his wife's jewels, reaches at the jewelry shop of Surendra Lal Seth, who gives him the said amount in exchange for the jewels. Mahendran promises to repay when he gets his job, and boards an auto rickshaw. Seth, however, orders his boys to collect the amount. They intentionally crash their bikes with the auto rickshaw, and while they fight, the bag full of money is taken away. The auto driver refuses to charge Mahendran anything and flees away. Mahendran rushes back to the police station and meets Thamizh, an honest cop, who decides to help him. Thamizh, Pazhani and Mahendran manage to locate the auto rickshaw and its driver, Kannan, who is beaten up and spills out the truth. Seth is also beaten up and he ends up revealing that while he conspired to get back the money, the boys who extracted it didn't return it to him. He also reveals about a dancer in Nellore whom the boys often met from time to time. With the help of Pazhani and a friendly cop in Nellore, Thamizh traces the dancer and questions her, but doesn't find anything significant.

Returning to Chennai, Thamizh asks his friends to arrange for money upon learning from Mahendran that the operation needs to be commenced soon. When he doesn't succeed in getting any money, his wife gives him their dead daughter's jewels and tells him to sell them. Thamizh hands over the jewels to Pazhani, who approaches Ezhumalai, a criminal, for money. Seeing Ezhumalai play with his daughter, Pazhani convinces him to save the life of the girl admitted in the hospital. The next day, he sends Thamizh a bag full of money under Pazhani's name, following which Thamizh is arrested by the Anti-Corruption Bureau for publicly accepting bribe. In prison, Pazhani apologizes to Thamizh and asks him about the enmity Ezhumalai has with him. He reveals that while he was in Madurai with his wife and daughter, he tried to help a woman being harassed for her property by Ezhumalai. However, he met various alibis whenever he tried to arrest him. When he was finally about to arrest him, he was handed over his transfer orders. In the meanwhile, Thamizh's daughter met with an accident at home, and when admitted to hospital, she couldn't survive. Thamizh learnt it through the nurses that the medicines were expired, and Ezhumalai's pharma agencies were responsible for more similar deaths. Following this, Thamizh decided to come to Chennai on request transfer. He is then freed due to his reputation in the department.

Thamizh sets up a plan to lure Seth into giving an officer 5 lakh rupees, following which Seth's boys crash their vehicles into the auto rickshaw and engage in fighting, but while trying to steal the bag, they are stopped by Thamizh, taken to a secret location and beaten up badly by an enraged Mahendran. The boys reveal everything about Ezhumalai's chain snatching and child kidnapping business, following which Thamizh conspires to kidnap Ezhumalai's daughter. He also joins hands with doctors at Kaveri Hospital. After a chase, he manages to get hold of Ravi, Ezhumalai's friend, and tells him to lure him into come to a spot, leaving behind his daughter. While going to school, Ezhumalai's daughter and wife are chased by bikers who end up in a crash, leaving the daughter injured. A worried Ezhumalai arrives at Kaveri Hospital and deposits the amount needed for the operation, which is used by the doctors to operate on Mahendran's daughter. She is saved, and in his next move, Thamizh tells the doctors to declare Ezhumalai's daughter dead. Upon hearing of her death, Ezhumalai and his wife break down, while his men start destroying the hospital. The doctor is almost attacked but Thamizh brings out Ezhumalai's daughter, reveals how he faked the accident, verbally confronts and gets him arrested.

During the end credits scene, Mahendran's daughter is seen dancing and Thamizh lifts her up in his arms.

== Cast ==
- Nandha as Thamizh
- Richard as Mahendran
- Ilavarasu as Pazhani
- Sharika as Mahendran's wife
- Usha Shree as Thamizh's wife
- Baby Rethva Isvar as Mahendran's daughter
- Ezhumalai as Ezhumalai
- Kumar Natarajan as Doctor

== Production ==
The film was shot extensively in Chennai and Madurai, with Nandha revealing that he signed the film because of director G. Ramesh's credentials as a cinematographer. The film began production in mid-2016 and was shot within seventeen days.

== Soundtrack ==
Kallattam

Soundtrack album by Umar Ezhilan
- Released: 2016
- Genre: Feature film soundtrack
- Length: 13:26
- Language: Tamil
- Label: Trend Music

The music was composed by Umar Ezhilan. Lyrics were written by Kalai Kumar, and the vocals were provided by M. M. Manasi, H. Shahjahan, M. L. R. Karthikeyan and Mohammed Aslam. Released digitally on 22 September 2016, the soundtrack was launched by actor Karthi on 24 September 2016.

Track listing
No.	Title	Lyrics	Music	Singer(s)	Length
1.	"Raa Rarandi"	Kalai Kumar	Umar Ezhilan	M. M. Manasi, H. Shahjahan	4:05
2.	"Vilaiyaadu Vilaiyaadu"	Kalai Kumar	Umar Ezhilan	M. L. R. Karthikeyan	4:23
3.	"Eeraezhu"	Kalai Kumar	Umar Ezhilan	Mohammed Aslam	4:58

== Release ==
The film was released theatrically on 30 September 2016.

== Reception ==
The film received negative reviews from critics.

Deccan Chronicle wrote that the film was "very touching and emotive in parts" and praised Nandha's performance, but criticized the "plastic feel" of the personalities and felt the plot was "aimless". Nettv4u.com gave the film 2.25 stars out of 5 and praised its loyalty to the action genre, music and cinematography, while criticizing the predictability and lacklusterness of the screenplay. Cinemaplusnews.com gave the film 2 stars out of 5 and praised the presentation, performances and editing, while criticizing the action scenes and writing. The Times of India gave the film 1.5 stars out of 5 and criticized the writing, editing, score, performances and staging of the scenes, while also praising certain plot elements but criticizing their execution. Indiaglitz also gave the film 1.5 stars out of 5 and praised the performances of Nandha, Ilavarasu and Richard Rishi, while criticizing those of other actors, writing, cinematography and the low production values.
