= Amanush =

Amanush (lit. 'inhuman') may refer to:

- Amanush (1975 film), an Indian Bengali-language action drama film by Shakti Samanta
- Amanush (2010 film), an Indian Bengali-language romantic thriller drama film by Rajiv Kumar Biswas
  - Amanush 2, its 2015 sequel also by Biswas
