= Kochadaiiyaan =

2014 Indian film by Soundarya Rajinikanth

- Theatrical release poster
- Directed by: Soundarya Rajinikanth
- Written by: K. S. Ravikumar
- Produced by: Sunil Lulla; Sunanda Murali Manohar; Prashita Chaudhary
- Starring: Rajinikanth; Deepika Padukone
- Narrated by: A. R. Rahman (Tamil); Amitabh Bachchan (Hindi); Dasari Narayana Rao (Telugu)
- Cinematography: Padmesh
- Edited by: Anthony
- Music by: A. R. Rahman
- Production companies: Eros International; Media One Global Entertainment; Cinemorphic
- Distributed by: Eros International
- Release date: 23 May 2014
- Running time: 124 minutes
- Country: India
- Language: Tamil
- Budget: ₹125 crore
- Box office: est. ₹85 crores

Kochadaiiyaan: The Legend (transl. King with mane) is a 2014 Indian Tamil-language animated period action film written by K. S. Ravikumar and directed by Soundarya Rajinikanth. It is India's first photorealistic motion capture film, featuring characters whose designs were based on the appearance and likeness of their respective actors. The film stars Rajinikanth and Deepika Padukone (in her Tamil debut), with R. Sarathkumar, Aadhi Pinisetty, Jackie Shroff, Nassar, Shobana and Rukmini Vijayakumar in supporting roles. The narrative follows the quest of an 8th-century warrior who seeks revenge after witnessing the unlawful punishment administered to his father, a good-hearted warrior in his kingdom, by the jealous ruler.

The film was the result of a complex development process, starting with the director's idea of directing and co-producing Sultan: The Warrior with Eros International in 2007, which was to feature Rajinikanth as an animated character. After cancelling the project due to lack of financial support, Soundarya and Eros turned their attention to producing Rana, which was to be a live-action historical fiction film directed by Ravikumar starring Rajinikanth and Padukone. However, the project was put on hold after Rajinikanth fell ill and uncertainty remained whether Rana would resume. In the meantime, producer Dr. J. Murali Manohar felt impressed by Soundarya's draft work on Sultan and persuaded her to materialise her directorial ambitions with Kochadaiiyaan, featuring a plot which leads itself up to the events of Rana, which was later deciphered as a sequel script to Kochadaiiyaan. The team agreed and completed filming in two years with Centroid Motion Capture at Pinewood Studios in the United Kingdom using motion capture technology, after which animation work and post-production ensued in the United States, Hong Kong, and China for a year. Music for the film was composed by A. R. Rahman and was performed by the London Session Orchestra. Rahman had been working with Kevin Lima for the later shelved film Bollywood Superstar Monkey and was inspired to bring motion capture technology to Indian cinema, hence he was also at the forefront in the film's development.

Kochadaiiyaan was promoted as "a tribute to the centennial of Indian cinema" and released worldwide in 3D and for traditional viewing on 23 May 2014 in Tamil and five additional languages, including Hindi, Telugu, Bengali, Marathi and Punjabi. Overall, the film received mixed to negative critical response worldwide, wherein critics drew comparisons to other films that have used motion capture technology, notably Avatar (2009), and noted general discrepancies in the animation. The film was heavily criticised for substandard motion capture animation and rendering. The film had a large opening in Tamil Nadu and across the world, while a less enthusiastic reception was seen in other parts of India. Though the film performed better in Tamil, it performed poorly in other parts of India, including Andhra Pradesh and Karnataka. The film eventually bombed at the box office leaving distributors in huge losses and producers in financial tangle.

== Plot ==
Rana, who hails from the kingdom of Kottaipattinam, leaves his family, despite his twin brother Sena pleading with him not to do so. The boy soon meets with an accident while rowing in the river and is eventually discovered by some fishermen from the neighbouring kingdom of Kalingapuri, a rival of Kottaipattinam. Rana grows up, he trains in weaponry, and becomes a fearless warrior. Due to his fighting skills and bravery, he soon wins the confidence of the king of Kalingapuri, Raja Mahendran, who promotes him as Commander-in-chief of the Kalingapuri army. The son of Raja Mahendran, Veera Mahendran shows Rana around the kingdom's mine where the captured soldiers of Kottaipattinam work as slaves. Veera says that this information is known only to a few people. After this, Rana promotes a war strategy to Veera that they release the slaves and have them trained in the army of Kalingapuri. Veera agrees and the slaves are freed. He then gets Raja Mahendran's approval to attack Kottaipattinam. However, during the war, Rana encounters his childhood friend, crown prince Sengodagan, the son of Rishikodagan, king of Kottaipattinam. Instead of fighting, it is revealed that the main motive of Rana's plan was to free the soldiers of Kottipattinam. Immediately signalling an end to the war, he, along with the soldiers disown Kalingapuri and return to Kottaipattinam, much to the disgust of Raja Mahendran and his son, crown prince Veera Mahendran, who swear revenge on Rana for tricking them and betraying Kalingapuri.

At Kottaipattinam, Rana and Sengodagan renew their friendship. Sengodagan introduces Rana to Rishikodagan, who is alarmed about seeing him. Rana also reunites with his younger sister Yamuna Devi whom he last saw as a baby and their uncle, who raised her, but soon learns that his mother Yaaghavi is dead and Sena is missing. He soon learns that Yamuna and Sengodagan are in love with each other. He accepts their relationship and decides to get them married. He cleverly convinces Rishikodagan, who is unwilling to get his son married to Yamuna since she is a commoner. Meanwhile, Rana also rekindles his love with his childhood sweetheart, princess Vadhana Devi, the daughter of Rishikodagan. Soon, Sengodagan and Yamuna get married. But following the wedding, Rishikodagan disowns Sengodagan.

That night, a masked man barges into the palace and attempts to kill Rishikodagan. Vadhana immediately goes after him, fights him, and gets him captured. Rishikodagan unmasks the assassin who is revealed to be Rana, and immediately throws him into prison, sentencing him to death. An upset Vadhana rushes to the cell where Rana is imprisoned, where Rana tells her why he attempted to kill Rishikodagan. Rana tells Vadhana that he is the younger son of Kochadaiiyaan, the former Commander-in-Chief of Kottaipattinam's army. Kochadaiiyaan is extremely respected in Kottaipattinam for his bravery and is more popular than Rishikodagan himself.

Due to this, Rishikodagan becomes jealous of Kochadaiiyaan. One night, when Kochadaiiyaan is returning by ship to Kottaipatinam with his army after buying horses and ammunition, they are attacked by the rival army of Kalingapuri. Kochadaiiyaan defeats them but allows them to return to their kingdom as an act of chivalry. However, the Kalingapuri army, before leaving, poisons the food on the ship. The Kottaipattinam army men consume this food, and fall ill. Despite knowing that he had been tricked by the Kalingapuri army, Kochadaiiyaan immediately rushes to Kalingapuri itself, because it is the only land body close enough to provide medicines to the sick and dying soldiers. He orders Raja Mahendran to provide medical assistance to his soldiers. Raja Mahendran, in turn, cunningly proposes a deal that, if he wants his men to be saved, he has to leave all the horses, ammunition, and the sick army men in Kalingapuri as slaves. Only if Kochadaiiyan agrees to this, his soldiers will be nursed back to health. Kochadaiiyan thinks that his men rather be alive as slaves than die from poisoning, and also thinks that when they officially wage a war in the near future, all of them could be easily rescued. So he accepts Raja Mahendran's offer and leaves Kalingapuri all alone. When he returns to Kottaipattinam, the jealous Rishikodagan seizes this opportunity to strip Kochadaiiyan off all respect and dignity and sentences him to death for becoming a traitor to Kottaipattinam because of surrendering his army men, horses, and ammunition to Kalingapuri.

Though all his subjects are dismayed at Kochadaiiyaan being sentenced to death, and his wife Yaaghavi even goes to the extent of publicly rebuking Rishikodagan for his injustice, Rishikodagan stands firm in his decision. Kochadaiiyaan is beheaded the following morning before Rana's eyes. In present, Rana tells Vadhana that he ran away to Kalingapuri, with the intention of freeing the soldiers of Kottaipattinam and to take revenge on Rishikodagan for unjustly killing his father. Vadhana is shocked on hearing about her father's actions and reconciles with Rana. She then pleads with her father to release Rana, but to no avail. Meanwhile, Rana escapes from the prison. When Rishikodagan learns of Rana's escape, he immediately arranges for Vadhana's marriage with prince Veera Mahendran after consulting with an astrologer and learning that his life is at Rana's mercy. Despite the enmity between Kottaipattinam and Kalingapuri, he arranges this marriage with the hope that their united armies and their mutual hatred for Rana can subdue him. On the day of the marriage, Rana arrives just when the marriage is about to take place. He and the people of Kottapattinam berate Rishikodagan for becoming a traitor and surrendering the whole kingdom of Kottaipattinam to Raja Mahendran for his own personal interests and commitments, which was the same charge that Rishikodagan had placed on Kochadaiiyaan years ago.

Following this, a war starts between Rana and the united armies of Kottaipattinam and Kalingapuri. Rana successfully manages to subdue the armies of both kingdoms and along with a majority of Kottaipattinam's army, he kills Raja Mahendran and allows Veera Mahendran to return as he was defeated, reminding him of their friendship. He then fights Rishikodagan and beheads him. Finally, as Rana and Vadhana reunite, a young soldier comes towards them riding a horse. This soldier is revealed to be Sena, who is angry as their father had asked him to protect the king but Rana had killed him, indicating that a fight awaits.

== Cast ==
- Rajinikanth in a triple role as
  - Kochadaiiyaan
  - Ranadheeran aka Rana
  - Senadheeran aka Sena (cameo in final scene)
- Deepika Padukone as Princess Vadhana Devi
- Shobana as Princess Yaaghavi Mahadevaki Devi
- R. Sarathkumar as Prince of Kottaipattinam Sengodagan
- Aadhi Pinisetty as Prince of Kalingapuri Veera Mahendran
- Rukmini Vijayakumar as Yamuna Devi
- Jackie Shroff as King of Kalingapuri Raja Mahendran
- Nassar as King of Kottaipattinam Rishikodagan
- Shanmugarajan as Devadhevan

Deceased actor Nagesh's likeness was recreated in the film, by means of a 3D model. Actors who sound like him were hired to voice his character while Ramesh Khanna performed the character physically, portraying the role of Shambumithrar (Rana's maternal uncle). Director Soundarya Rajinikanth, uncredited, appears as a dancer clad in blue in the song "Engae Pogutho Vaanam".

== Production ==
=== Development ===
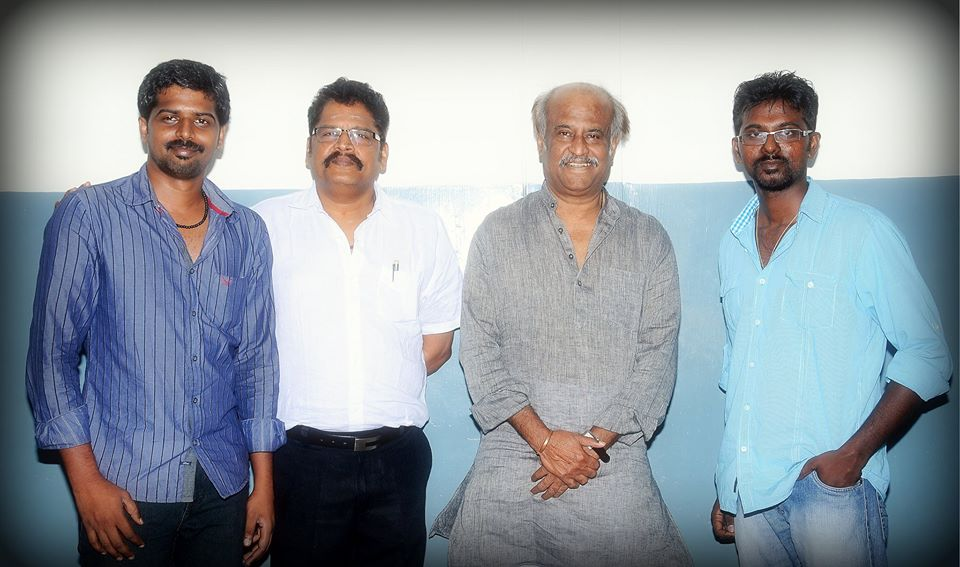
K. S. Ravikumar and Rajinikanth (both in centre) with two of the Kochadaiiyaan directorial team members

After the release of Enthiran (2010), actor Rajinikanth approached filmmaker K. S. Ravikumar to help complete an animated feature that the former's daughter Soundarya had begun in 2007. The project, titled Sultan: The Warrior, had run into problems with its production and Rajinikanth hoped that they could salvage the project by adding a historical back plot which would make the film partially animation and partially live action. Ravikumar then developed a story for fifteen days with his team of assistants and after being impressed by the script, Rajinikanth felt that Ravikumar's story should be an entirely separate film. Thus the team launched a venture titled Rana, to be jointly produced by Ocher Picture Productions and Eros International. The film would have featured cinematographer R. Rathnavelu and music would have been composed by A. R. Rahman. Principal photography for Rana began on 29 April 2011. However, during the first schedule of filming, Rajinikanth fell ill on sets and was admitted to hospital where he was treated for dehydration and exhaustion for over a month, resulting in an indefinite postponement of filming. Further attempts for the film to continue production throughout the year failed.

On 23 November 2011, for her maiden directorial project, Soundarya tweeted through her Twitter account, notifying followers to watch out for an official announcement. Kochadaiyaan was formally announced the next day. A tentatively scheduled release period of August 2012 was also announced. The film was finalised to be a co-production of Eros Entertainment and Media One Global. Soundarya further stated that Ravikumar had worked with her father and herself on the script of the film. With regards to the film's title, Ravikumar claimed that it drew reference to an alternate name of the Hindu deity Shiva, while also being partly inspired by the name of the Pandya dynasty king Kochchadaiyan Ranadhira, and that the plot would be a fictional account with small references to Indian history. The title's root meaning is "king with long, curly chada mudi" (mane). The director clarified that Kochadaiiyaan was not related to the same-titled history series being published by the Tamil magazine Kumudam. When rumours circulated that the temporarily shelved Rana was being revived as Kochadaiiyaan, Ravikumar denied these rumours saying, "Kochadaiyaan has nothing to do with Ranadheeran or Rana." Soundarya's mother Latha Rajinikanth also clarified that the film would serve as a precursor to Rana. In October 2013, the spelling of the film's title was changed from Kochadaiyaan to Kochadaiiyaan on Rajinikanth's request citing numerological reasons.

=== Cast and crew ===
Soundarya initially approached Bollywood actress Katrina Kaif in January 2012, but Deepika Padukone, who was slated to pair with Rajinikanth in Rana, took up the offer that February, making her Tamil debut. Padukone was reportedly paid a salary of ₹30 million (US$310,000) for shooting only for two days in the film. According to Soundarya, she was "quite relieved to not be wearing make-up for a film for the first time in her career." Padukone did not dub her own voice for the Tamil version as the dialogues required authentic Tamil pronunciations, and she was unavailable during the dubbing schedules. Hence, Savitha Radhakrishnan dubbed the voice for Padukone in Tamil. Though it was initially reported that she would dub her own voice for the Hindi version, ultimately, Mona Ghosh Shetty did so. Shetty had earlier dubbed for Padukone in Om Shanti Om (2007).

The film began to increase its casting profile after Malayalam actor Prithviraj Sukumaran was rumoured to have been signed to play an important role in the film. The rumour was falsified following the inclusion of Aadhi Pinisetty, who was known for his lead-role performances in Mirugam and Eeram, in the cast; when he confirmed his presence in the project, he remarked that working with Rajinikanth was "a realisation of a dream that he has had since childhood". Sneha confirmer her presence in the film in December 2011. She, however, opted-out a couple of months later citing conflicts in her schedule and Rukmini Vijayakumar was signed in her place. R. Sarathkumar accepted Soundarya's offer for an important role in the film while veteran actor Nassar was recruited in the film as well for a supporting role.

Soundarya confirmed that Shobana was added to the cast saying that she was the "only choice" for the role as it was written keeping her in mind. Bollywood actor Jackie Shroff was also approached for an antagonistic role. Shroff immediately gave his consent, when the cast and the technical scope of Kochadaiiyaan were revealed to him. The deceased actor Nagesh was digitally recreated through sophisticated animation techniques.

Peter Hein was chosen as the film's action choreographer, while A. R. Rahman agreed to compose the film's background score and soundtrack. Soundarya chose Saroj Khan, Raju Sundaram, Chinni Prakash and his wife Surekha Chinni Prakash, and Sivashankar to choreograph the songs. Soundarya invited art professionals to send their work as she was forming an art department for Kochadaiiyaan. She chose 42 students from the Government College of Fine Arts, Chennai for the task, besides 50 experienced persons from the Jacob College of Fine Arts. 60 concept artistes were already reportedly working for the film.

=== Design ===
Neeta Lulla worked on the looks of each character, including the lead role portrayed by Rajinikanth. According to Lulla, the project required a lot of research. Around 150 costumes per character were designed on paper and out of those, 25 costumes were selected and detailed. She also created a range of 20 to 30 looks especially for Rajinikanth's suit of armour as well as the supporting cast of Kochadaiiyaan. Lulla, along with the team working on the costumes, created the looks of all characters on the sketch. They had worked for about eight months on the various characterisations of Rajinikanth and the supporting cast. According to her, "It was a different kind of design experience altogether".

On Rajinikanth's looks, Soundarya quoted: "First, we scanned his face and made a 3D model to get the exact precision of his features, such as the scar on his nose. And then we corrected the 3D model by tightening his skin to make him look 25 years younger. They used that technology in the film Tron." The youthfulness of the look was compared to the looks that Rajinikanth carried in his film Muthu. Soundarya also claimed that Rajinikanth's hairstyle in the film was inspired by his appearance in his earlier film, Thalapathi.

==== Sound design ====
Resul Pookutty is the sound designer for the film. He worked over two and a half years on the sound design of the film. Three teams of sound editors were working in Los Angeles, Mumbai, and Chennai under him. The final phase of re-recording was done in Chennai at A. R. Rahman's studio during end-March 2014. In an interview with The Hindu he quoted, "For the war sequence, we got 150 people scream like how they would in a war and recorded the sound. I went to fortresses and collected samples of how sound resonates. Based on the impulse response data, we recreated the acoustics of a durbar." Pookutty started working from the scratch instead of using available sound samples. He added that when his team started working on the foley (ambient sounds) he told the film director to provide him with the exact costumes used while filming. However, realising that the filming was done using performance capture technology, the entire set of costumes were designed to provide requisite foley. He also paid attention to nuances extensively where he added, "For instance, the image you see on screen is a composite of several layers of images. The clothes, the movement, the swords and so on were created separately and put together. My team also had to add sound, layer by layer."

=== Filming ===
The film posters showed that the film would use performance capturing technology, which was used in films such as Avatar and The Adventures of Tintin. During production, Kochadaiiyaan was claimed to be the first Indian film to use the technology.

The film was launched with a formal puja on 19 January 2012 at the Ganesha temple located inside AVM Studios in Vadapalani, Chennai. The first phase of production began in Chennai on 15 March 2012. It was then moved to London on 17 March 2012, where motion capture filming was done at Centroid Motion Picture lab in Pinewood Studios Production in London lasted for 15 days, during which, Rajinikanth announced that the film might be released for Diwali 2012. After completing the first phase of production in London, the crew returned to Chennai on 2 April 2012. The next schedule of the film shooting was planned at various locations in Tamil Nadu and Kerala. Filming in Los Angeles took place at CounterPunch Studios.

The second phase of production began at the Chitranjali Studio in Thiruvananthapuram. Although initial reports claimed that production had moved to Mohanlal's Vismayas Max studio, it was later reported that shooting never took place at that studio. It instead happened at Accel Animation Studios, where the crew shot scenes which they were unable to complete during their schedule in London. The second phase was completed on 30 April 2012, after which a romantic song choreographed by Saroj Khan was filmed in early May 2012. It was said that the entire film shooting would be completed in the second schedule itself and the post-production work would begin. However, the team was off with the lead actor to Hong Kong for the third schedule of the film on 12 May 2012 where some crucial scenes and combat scenes featuring the lead actor and the antagonist were shot at the State of the Arts Gallery studio. Since the film was shot using performance capture technology, 48 cameras were used to shoot each and every scene. The 48 cameras captured performance of artistes' at 48 angles. Kochadaiiyaan was equipped with Auro 3D sound technology. As per reports, due to involvement of extensive graphics, four separate teams, including teams from Chennai and London were also working on the film. On 20 February 2013 the director announced through Twitter that Kochadaiiyaan was in the process of being finalised. On 28 February 2013 the final edited version of the film was screened by the director, writer and the lead actor along with handful crew members. As the filming was done using motion capture technology, the Tandav dance in the song "Engal Kochadaiiyaan" was performed by dancer Yuvraaj Jayakumar. The dance was shot in as early as in 2010, and was initially intended for the shelved Sultan: The Warrior. The genre of the same was neither western nor Indian but a contemporary dance form.

Lollu Sabha Jeeva reenacted Rajinikanth's character in a few sequences.

The dubbing for the film's Telugu version Vikramasimha began on 25 August 2013.

== Music ==
The soundtrack and background score of the film was composed by A. R. Rahman, who was initially hesitant to work on the project but started after he felt the "positive energy and the commitment". The rights to the soundtrack album were sold to Sony Music Entertainment in August 2012. British music engineer Geoff Foster was involved in mixing 200 tracks of orchestra for Kochadaiiyaan. The track "Engae Pogudho Vaanam" was released on 7 October 2013 as a single, along with its Telugu version "Choodham Aakasam Antham". On 9 March 2014, the original version as well as the Telugu version of the album were released at Sathyam Cinemas in Royapettah, Chennai. The album gained the top position on the iTunes charts in India within hours of its release. Meanwhile, "Kochadaiiyaan" became a top trending topic on Twitter in India, making it a first for a Tamil film. The song "Maattram Ondrudhaan Maaraadhadhu" was the chart topping track from the album at almost every music charts of South India

== Release ==
Initially, the film was set for a November 2012 release in India. The film was then planned to be released in January 2013 coinciding with Pongal however the release date was postponed. In course of time, it was postponed multiple times due to various enhancement schedules and extensive post-production work. A final release date was announced for 9 May 2014, but was yet again pushed to 23 May 2014. On this delay, Eros International clarified that there was a surge of demand for an additional 200 prints (multiple language release, 2D and 3D versions of the film) for as many screens all over the world that was to be met in just two days prior to the release as the response to advance booking was extraordinary. An estimated 125,000 tickets were sold out within two hours in Chennai alone when the release was set on 9 May 2014. Furthermore, producer Sunanda Murali Manohar attributed the delay to the Central Board of Film Certification (CBFC), which unexpectedly went on to certify all language versions separately.

In March 2013, the distribution rights for the film in the United States were sold to ATMUS Entertainment while Hyderabad-based Lakshmy Ganapathy Films purchased the distribution rights of Vikramasimha, the film's Telugu version. In July 2012, Jaya TV bought the film's television broadcast rights for an undisclosed sum. A song titled "Koottam Seru, Kosham Podu" was released on 7 May 2014 to celebrate the release of Kochadaiiyaan.

Kochadaiiyaan was released over 3,000 screens in overseas markets. The Telugu version had hit more than 50 screens in the United States. In the US, out of 103 screens, 88 screens had the Tamil 3D version whereas rest of the number with 2D. The original and its Telugu version in 3D and 2D versions had subtitles, were confirmed for a release on 22 May 2013 in overseas markets. Kajani Movies and PSK Movies, both these distributors confirmed the screen count as 20 in Switzerland In Malaysia, only LFS State 2 Cineplex in Petaling Jaya was showing the 3D version of the film, while other cinemas were screening it in 2D; the movie was released in more than 77 screens. The highest for any Indian movie released in Malaysia, beating the previous record held by Singam II. In Chennai, as of 2014, AGS Entertainment equipped four screens at its multiplex on Rajiv Gandhi Salai with the latest passive 3D systems and 2K projectors with Harkness silver screens. Sathyam Cinemas will open the film in five of its multiplexes and has planned to sell around 15,000 tickets. AGS Cinemas had screened the film in 3D at three screens at its Villivakkam multiplex and four screens at its OMR multiplex, unleashing 10,000 tickets on the opening day.

=== Marketing ===
The first trailer of the film was all set to be screened at 66th annual Cannes Film Festival in mid-May 2013, however it was delayed due to Soundarya's dissatisfaction over the final cut of the trailer. The first teaser trailer was released digitally on 9 September 2013, coinciding with Ganesh Chaturthi to mixed response; while fans of Rajinikanth were satisfied, others criticised its sub-par visual effects. It was also noted for its similarities to the teaser trailer of Soundarya's shelved animation venture Sultan the Warrior, that was also supposed to feature Rajinikanth. Nevertheless, it was viewed over 1 million times on a single day, establishing it as one of the most anticipated film teasers in the history of Tamil cinema. Soundarya also announced that a second trailer would be released, which would feature Padukone prominently, and unlike the first trailer, it would have sound and dialogues. The trailer was released in Tamil, Telugu and Hindi on 9 March 2014, the same day of the audio launch.

In 2012, the producers struck a deal with Karbonn Mobiles, an Indian telecommunication firm that will involve Kochadaiiyaan merchandise worth ₹5 lakh (US$5,200) with screen savers and images from the film along with the trailer, behind the scenes shots, the signature tune of the film and lead actor's signature on the back cover of phones. However, delays in the film caused the clause to be modified. Sudhir Hasija, chairman of Karbonn, said, "We will roll out a million handsets by February-end or first week of March 2014 with a pre-loaded app for the movie. All the handsets will come with the signature of Rajinikanth. This is the first time any mobile handset maker is launching products with an augmented reality app." The promotional tactic is an extension of Eros' alliance with Karbonn, wherein the latter will make a million special-edition phones. A company called InGage Technologies have done its complete development. Using augmented reality, they set interactive Kochadaiiyaan hoardings in association with Karbonn Mobiles. Eros has deployed 500 interactive hoardings across India. People will have to stand in front of the hoarding and send an SMS to activate the hoarding. Karbonn stated that an estimate of 400 hoardings would be put up across the country, majority in southern states of India. Hoardings and banners of the film will be displayed at 3,650 Bharat Petroleum stations across South India.

On 21 April 2013, Soundarya revealed a first fully 3D rendered picture, which shows Rajinikanth in two different avatars. It was also announced that a "making-of-the-movie" video would be released, where a song featuring Rajinikanth's voice would be used. It was shown nearly a year later on 9 March 2014 to the audience of the music launch event. In mid-March 2014, the franchise was expanded further as Hungama Digital Media Entertainment and Gameshastra launched two mobile games based on the film available for download on mobile platforms, called Kochadaiiyaan: Kingdom Run and Kochadaiiyan: Reign of Arrows. By mid-May 2014, the games surpassed the mark of one million downloads across the iOS App Store, Google Play and Windows Phone Store.

iPlay's director Rave Shankar and his team had approached the film's producers to screen the theatrical trailer in 5-D format at Phoenix Market City Mall in Velachery, Chennai. The producers provided the 3-D print of the trailer at no cost. Shankar and his team worked for about 10 days to get the synchronisation of the chair movements, sprayings, and light effects for the trailer. The experience for viewers was defined such that the chairs quake and rumble as the scenes of war appear and wet sprays are sprinkled on the audience when the character Kochadaiiyaan rides on a dolphin in the trailer.

== Reception ==
=== Critical response ===
On the review aggregator website Rotten Tomatoes, 43% of 7 critics' reviews are positive, with an average rating of 5.8/10.

Kochadaiiyaan received mixed reviews from critics worldwide, it was heavily criticised for substandard motion capture animation and rendering, but praise for all other aspects of the film, mainly the story, writing, music, designs, and performances, especially that of Rajinikanth in his first-ever film of such a complex format.

==== India ====
Critic Taran Adarsh for Bollywood Hungama wrote, "On the whole, the absorbing screenplay and the technology make Kochaaiiyaan an interesting fare. For the legion of Rajinikanth fans, this film is definitely worth a watch. Recommended!" He gave the film 3.5 stars (out of 5). M. Suganth of The Times of India gave the film 3.5 stars out of 5 and noted, "Kochadiiyaan succeeds not because of technology but because of the writing. The film is motion capture 3D computer-animated but the animation is primeval. There is also inconsistency in the animation. Like any other Rajini movie, Kochadaiiyaan too worships its star. His character appears in almost every scene and there are fan-pleasing moments in the form of stylistic gestures and dialogues." Critic Komal Nahta through is official publishing summarised, "On the whole, Kochadaiiyaan – The Legend does not have much for the Hindi film-going audience and will, therefore, not fare well at the box-office. However, its Tamil version has the potential to prove a big hit because of the demi-God status enjoyed by Rajinikanth among the Tamil-speaking audience and also due to the novelty factor."

Critic at Sify praised the director Soundarya Rajinikanth's work stating, "It is a testament to one girl's ambition, imagination and courage to make India's first photo-realistic, 3D." Further wrote, "After watching the film, one gets the feel that there is more to it than just the animation". At Deccan Chronicle, Thinkal Menon gave the film 3.5 stars (out of 5) and stated, "Unsurprisingly, the brand name 'Rajini' has proved for the umpteenth time that his face value alone could carry a movie on his shoulders. 'Kochadaiiyaan' has embraced technology in the best possible way, not to forget this being the very first attempt." Rachit Gupta at Filmfare gave a bottom line—"Technical snags can't stop Rajinikanth from entertaining". He praised the director stating, "As director Soundarya Rajinikanth Ashwin puts it in a pre-movie build up scene, it's homage to 100 Years of Indian Cinema. It's an ode from possibly the biggest star of Indian movies to the Indian film industry and its fans. It's a celebratory mark to all that we've come to love and respect in our films. If you are Rajini fan, you have a treat in stored in the climax. There's promise of a kickass sequel too. All said and done, for best results take it all with a pinch of salt." Ritika Handoo of Zee News gave the film 3.5 stars (out of 5) and felt, "After watching a folklore turned into a 3D computer-animated photo-realistic motion picture format, all we can say is – this is a tribute to 'Thalaiva'!"

Critic Subhash K. Jha for Indo Asian News Service gave the film 3.5 stars (out of 5) and stated that only "Yes, Rajnikanth roars again. Never mind if the lion is computer-generated. The superstar returns in a stylish never-before avatar conceived and executed by the star's daughter who is an unabashed fan." Tushar Joshi of DNA India gave the film 2.5 stars out of 5 and opined, "Conventional fans might find it a bit hard to worship their hero in this CGI avatar, but Kochadaiiyaan is a big bold step in opening new frontiers to film making, a step that deserves to be supported.

Rajeev Masand for CNN-IBN wrote, "The problem with Kochadaiiyaan is clear. The focus here isn't on telling a compelling story, but on celebrating the legend with these larger-than-life incarnations. As a result, the film will likely appeal to all hardcore fans of Thalaivar, but may leave most others cold. I'm going with two out of five for Kochadaiiyaan. This one's strictly for fans." At The Indian Express critic Shubhra Gupta summarised in negative—"Even Rajinikanth, the one and the only, can't pick up a film and run with it, if it has the oldest, creakiest plots cobbled together from many books." The critic gave the film 1.5 stars (out of 5). Mihir Fadnavis at Firstpost called the film "A disaster from start to finish". He didn't assign any score to the film and felt that "CGI in Kochadaiiyaan can only be described as loose motion capture." Raja Sen of Rediff gave the film 1 star out of 5 and ranted, "Rajinikanth's Kochadaiiyaan is a bad puppet show, alas, is a fundamentally flawed dud, one without anything to applaud besides grand (if self-glorifying) ambition. And little is as heartbreaking to witness as utterly failed ambition. This is a loud, unforgivably tacky production, handicapped not merely by substandard animation but a complete lack of imagination.." Baradwaj Rangan of The Hindu wrote "Kochadaiiyaan is truly history-making in a sense, because this is the first time that a huge star has allowed himself to be the hero in a full-length animated feature. Walking out, you may find yourself wondering: Did it have to be Rajinikanth?".

==== Overseas ====
Sneha May Francis, writing for Emirates 24/7, praised the film stating, "Despite the lack of technical finesse, the filmmaker deserves to be applauded for taking a step towards innovation and change, and setting the ground work for Rana". However she remarked, "Rajinikanth dazzles in Kochadaiiyaan with master strokes. It is his physical presence that the audience will miss in the epic drama." Manjusha Radhakrishnan of Gulf News said, "Kochadaiiyaan might have taken a small step towards introducing Avatar-like technology into our lives, but it's no giant leap. If you have blind faith and (obsessive) love for Rajinikanth and all things animation, you may enjoy this film. For others it may prove a battle to remain glued to your seats." and rated the film 2 out of 5.

J Hurtado of Twitch Film said, "Nearly all of the animated characters suffered from the same problems. Dead eyes, wonky animation, poor rendering, often they even appeared slightly out of focus on the screen. Glitches, perhaps, but the curious thing is that none of those issues affected Rajnikanth's appearance." He added, "I've been waiting for Kochadaiiyaan for years, since the film was a rumor, but with all of the hype, delays, and eventual disappointing final product, I feel that my enthusiasm was at best wasted and at worst betrayed. Rajnikanth is an international treasure, a film hero like none ever seen, and Kochadaiiyaan is a project beneath his abilities and less than he deserves." Abraham Richard of Times of Oman felt, "Despite the technical flaws Rajni and Soundarya deserve to be applauded for their daring effort and initiative for trying to push the industry to the next level. Whatever said and done this movie is worth a watch especially for the efforts put in. Kochadaiiyaan will make a mark in the history of film making in India as this is the first time that a huge star has allowed himself to be a hero in a full-length animated movie.

=== Box office ===
The Tamil version opened to what the Deccan Chronicle and Bollywood Hungama identified as packed houses. The film's Telugu version Vikramasimha was released in the state of Andhra Pradesh in 700 theatres, far more than in Tamil Nadu where it released in 450 theatres, In Bangalore, the film released in the Tamil, Hindi and Telugu versions and while the Hindi and Telugu versions hardly had an audience and were removed from theatres after a week, the Tamil version did well. The film had very few shows outside the metros. At theatrical centres in North like Jaipur, Kanpur and Lucknow have very few screenings. The release was much strong in Mumbai and Pune where screens were relatively greater. The film collected ₹5.51 crore (US$570,000) in Chennai in fourth weekend. The film collected ₹30 crore (US$3.1 million) in India and ₹12 crore (US$1.2 million) in overseas.Kochadaiiyaan on its opening weekend had collected a total amount, estimate ₹420 million (US$4.4 million) gross worldwide. The film was declared a hit at the box office in Tamil, while the Telugu version settled with an average verdict, and the Hindi and remaining versions being declared as failures. it had bumper opening weekend and grossed but the hype slowly faded and the film eventually bombed at the box office leaving distributors in huge loss.

== See also ==
- Indian animation industry
