= Asthitva =

- Directed by: Nuthan Umesh
- Screenplay by: Nuthan Umesh
- Story by: Jeeva Shankar
- Based on: Naan
- Produced by: B.S. Vishwa Cariappa
- Starring: Yuvraj
- Cinematography: Rakesh B
- Music by: Vijay Antony
- Production company: VSan Vision
- Release date: 19 August 2016
- Running time: 145 minutes
- Country: India
- Language: Kannada

Asthitva is a 2016 Kannada thriller film directed by Nuthan Umesh, who had earlier directed Krishnan Marriage Story. The movie is a remake of the 2012 Tamil thriller Naan which itself was inspired by the 1999 movie The Talented Mr. Ripley. The film is produced by B.S.Vishwa cariappa under production company VSan Vision stars Yuvraj, Prajwal Pooviah, and Duniya Rashmi in the lead roles.

== Plot ==
The plot revolves around Ram an orphan (Hindu) takes on the identity of Raheem (Muslim), a dead MBBS aspirant and starts to live a lie. Would he be able to keep on staying free from the trap of untruths that he turns?

== Cast ==
- Yuvraj as Ram (alias Rahim)
- Prajwal Pooviah as Khushi
- Duniya Rashmi
- Shine Shetty as Vicky
- Sonu Gowda
- Madhusudhan as Krish
- Shankar Ashwath
- K. S. Shridar
- Shashidhar Kote
- Rajesh Nataranga as Vijay Kumar
- Madhusudan Vijaykumar

== Soundtrack ==
The music was composed by Vijay Antony who composed the original film retaining all the tunes. All lyrics were written by V. Nagendra Prasad.

Asthitva

Soundtrack album by Vijay Antony
- Released: 27 June 2016
- Recorded: 2016
- Genre: Soundtrack
- Length: 23:49
- Label: VSan Music
- Producer: Vijay Antony

Vijay Antony chronology
Nambiar (2016)	Asthitva (2016)	Saithan (2016)

Track list
No.	Title	Singer(s)	Length
1.	"Barediro Vidhi Baraha"	Badri Prasad	4:47
2.	"Barko Nin Hane Bara"	Vijay Prakash	4:26
3.	"Nenapugale Moodive"	Rajesh Krishnan	4:37
4.	"Ragadaithi Ragadaithi"	Apoorva Sridhar, Deepak Doddera	4:52
5.	"Barko Nin Hane Bara" (Theme)	Instrumental	2:12
6.	"Asthitva" (Theme)	Instrumental	2:55
Total length:			23:49

== Reception ==
A critic from The Times of India rated the film two-and-a-half out of five stars and wrote that "For those who have watched the original, this doesn't measure up. For those who haven't, you could watch the film once if you overlook some parts". A critic from Vijaya Karnataka wrote that "A tight narrative that not only holds the audience in suspense but also evokes realism. But the question is whether the movie is giving a wrong message to the audience".
