= Siddharth Venugopal =

Indian film actor

- Born: Siddharth Venugopal; 28 November 1985 (age 40); Hyderabad, India
- Occupation: Actor
- Years active: 2006-2012

Siddharth Venugopal is a former Indian film actor who has appeared in Tamil films. He made his lead debut in Gandhi Krishna's romantic musical Ananda Thandavam (2009), and also co-starred in Jeeva Shankar's crime thriller Naan (2012).

== Early life ==
Siddharth Venugopal was born on 28 November 1985 in Hyderabad to a Tamil family, but was brought up in Coimbatore. He has a sister named Rathi. He did his schooling in Lisieux Matriculation Higher Secondary School Coimbatore, before moving on to complete a degree in information technology at Kumaraguru College of Technology. Following a brief stint in films, he returned to education in 2011 after signing up for an MBA at Graziadio School of Business and Management at Pepperdine University, California.

== Career ==
During his college days, Siddharth had taken up modelling assignments and acting courses and in October 2007, six months old in a Chennai multinational company, he got a call from director Gandhi Krishna’s office, after the director saw him in a print ad. After a six-hour audition, he was selected to play the lead role in the director's romantic musical Ananda Thandavam, a film adaptation of the Sujatha serialized novel Pirivom Santhippom. The film was shot in India and USA for more than a year and featured him alongside Tamannaah and Rukmini Vijayakumar. However the film opened to unanimously poor reviews in early 2009, with a critic from Sify.com stating that the actor "can do little to save the film". Rediff.com felt that Siddharth's performance was one of the weaker aspects of the film noting "though he does his best when he's romancing his beloved, and there are sparks during emotional scenes, he seems to miss his cue a few times, making you wonder if someone with acting chops might have done a better job."

Siddharth, before the release of his debut film had agreed to star in another film produced by Aascar Ravichandran to be directed by newcomer Jeeva Shankar. The film titled Naan was to see him portraying the lead role with Rukmini Vijayakumar playing the lead female role, however due to the failure of Ananda Thandavam, the producer called off the project. The film restarted with Vijay Antony's interception as producer in 2010, while the music director making his debut as an actor also took the lead role from Siddharth. The film was shot over two years, with Siddharth playing the second lead, amongst an ensemble cast also including actresses Rupa Manjari, Anuya Bhagwat and Vibha Natarajan. The film released in August 2012 to predominantly positive reviews, with Siddharth gaining critical acclaim for his performance of the rich youngster, Ashok with a critic noting he is "impressive".

== Filmography ==
Year	Film	Role	Notes
2006	June R	Sundar	
2009	Ananda Thandavam	Raghu	
2012	Naan	Ashok	
