= Naan (2012 film) =

2012 Indian film by Jeeva Shankar

- Directed by: Jeeva Shankar
- Written by: Neelan K. Sekar (Dialogue); Jeeva Shankar (Additional Dialogue)
- Screenplay by: Jeeva Shankar
- Story by: Jeeva Shankar
- Produced by: Fathima Vijay Antony
- Starring: Vijay Antony; Siddharth Venugopal; Rupa Manjari; Anuya Bhagvath
- Cinematography: Jeeva Shankar
- Edited by: Sathish Suriya
- Music by: Vijay Antony
- Production company: Vijay Antony Film Corporation
- Distributed by: Sri Devar Pictures
- Release date: 15 August 2012
- Running time: 141 minutes
- Language: Tamil

Naan (English: Me) is a 2012 Indian Tamil-language crime thriller film written and directed by Jeeva Shankar in his directorial debut. Composer Vijay Antony plays the lead role of a psychopathic killer; he also produced the film and worked as the music director. Siddharth Venugopal and Rupa Manjari appeared in supporting roles. The filming of Naan began in October 2011, and the film was released on 15 August 2012. The movie was remade in Bengali in 2015 as Amanush 2 and in Kannada in 2016 as Asthitva. The film was followed by a sequel titled Salim, an action thriller that released in 2014. The plot of the film is loosely based on 1999 American film The Talented Mr. Ripley.

== Plot ==
Karthik is a brilliant student but already shows signs of criminal behaviour in childhood, like forging his friend's parent's signature on a report card. Sent home from school early for this misdeed, Karthik is shocked to discover his mother in bed with a neighbour. His mother begs him not to disclose her affair to his father, but he does so, and his father commits suicide. Karthik's mother continues her illicit relationship. One day, Karthik kills his mother and her lover by setting the house on fire. He is sent to a juvenile home where he grows up. On his release, the warden gives him the address of his uncle and asks him to concentrate on his studies.

Karthik's aunt is not willing to take him in, so he goes to Chennai to start a new life. As fate would have it, the bus meets with an accident, and his fellow passenger, Mohammed Salim, is killed. Karthik steals Salim's documents, adopts his identity, and enrolls in a government medical college in MBBS. He befriends a rich classmate named Ashok, his girlfriend Rupa, and their friend Suresh. Ashok allows Salim to stay in his house rent-free. Later, Salim and Ashok encounter the warden from the former's juvenile home, who recognises Karthik. However, since Karthik is now impersonating Salim, he picks up an argument with the warden and swears that he is not the person he thinks he is. Nevertheless, Ashok becomes suspicious of his new friend.

One day Ashok and Suresh go to a farmhouse without Rupa. Suresh suggests that they take some girls along. Salim lets Rupa know of this plan due to her sincere and true love for Ashok. Rupa starts to suspect that Ashok is cheating on her, while Ashok worries that Salim betrayed him to Rupa. Ashok slaps Salim angrily and tells him to move out. Katrhik apologises to him and agrees to look for another lodging.

While Karthik is showering, Ashok opens his briefcase. He finds a photo of Karthik's biological father and realises that it was a different man that Karthik had introduced as his actual father earlier. Suddenly, Karthik enters the room and asks Ashok to give the photo back. Ashok refuses, removes Karthik's towel, and confirms that he is not a Muslim, as he is not circumcised. Salim gets angry and shoves Ashok; Ashok hits his head on a table and dies. At first, Karthik is horrified by what he has done, but he then covers up the murder by burying Ashok's body in a graveyard on the outskirts so intelligently that no one ever finds out that Ashok is dead. When a family friend of Ashok, who has not seen Ashok since he was a child, plans to meet him, Karthik successfully impersonates Ashok, fooling even Ashok's parents and Rupa.

Suresh, however, discovers Karthik's deception, so Karthik kills him and buries him in the same graveyard. The following day, the police come to Ashok's house and reveal that they have found Suresh's corpse. They interrogate several people in the city, including Karthik, but he fools them into concluding that Ashok killed Suresh and fled; meanwhile, they consider Karthik (now back to impersonating Salim) an innocent and a hard-working student. Karthik continues to live as Salim after convincing Salim's father into giving him his son's identity. The film ends with the cliff hanger "To Be Continued".

== Cast ==
- Vijay Antony as Karthik / Mohammed Salim
- Siddharth Venugopal as Ashok Ravindran
- Rupa Manjari as Rupa
- Anuya Bhagvath as Priya
- Vijay Victor as Suresh
- Vibha Natarajan as Uma
- Charmila as Karthik's mother
- Ratsasan Saravanan as the original Mohammed Salim
- Pramod as Inspector Duraipandiyan
- Krishnamoorthy
- Shyam as Ashok's enemy
- Saivam Ravi as Karthik's uncle
- Neelan K. Sekar as Salim's mansion mate

== Production ==
The film was initially launched in 2008, with Siddharth Venugopal and Rukmini Vijayakumar playing the lead roles. However, due to the failure of their previous film Ananda Thandavam, the producer Oscar Ravichandran called off the project. The film restarted with Vijay Antony's intervention in October 2011 who also took the lead role from Siddharth, while the latter plays a supporting role in the film.

== Soundtrack ==
Naan

Soundtrack album to Naan by Vijay Antony
- Released: 4 June 2012 (Single) 30 July 2012 (Album)
- Recorded: 2012
- Genre: Film soundtrack
- Language: Tamil
- Labels: Gemini Audio; T-Series
- Producer: Vijay Antony

Vijay Antony chronology
Velayudham (2011)	Naan (2012)	Daruvu (2012)

The soundtrack has six tracks, all composed by Vijay Antony himself. Following Yuvan Shankar Raja, who created single tracks in Vaanam and Mankatha, Vijay Antony too released a single track "Makkayala Makkayala" in June 2012.

Track list
No.	Title	Lyrics	Singer(s)	Length
1.	"Makkayala Makkayala"	Priyan	Krishan Maheson, Mark Thomas, Shakthisree Gopalan	4:52
2.	"Thapellam Thape Illai"	Asmin	Hiphop Adhi, Santhosh Hariharan	4:27
3.	"Ulaginil Miga Uyaram"	Annamalai	Vijay Antony	4:49
4.	"Dinnam Dinnam"	Annamalai	Deepak	4:35
5.	"No One Is Perfect (Theme)"		Instrumental	2:56
6.	"Thappelam Thappe Illai (Version 2)"	Asmin	Vijay Antony	2:36
Total length:				24:25

== Release ==
=== Critical reception ===
Malathi Rangarajan of The Hindu praised as "Well done!" and said: "A plethora of pluses make Naan watch-worthy. Vijay Antony’s acumen comes to the fore in his choice of a subject that’s strong and a character that’s stronger". N. Venkateswaran of The Times of India gave Naan 3.5 out of 5 stars, writing that "but for some minor blips, the writing (and therefore the movie too) is pretty gripping throughout, and keeps the audience on the edge of the seats", calling it "[T]he perfect thriller to spice up the weekend". IBNLive wrotet that "'Naan' is racy and appealing" and also adding that "it is a racy crime thriller that is quite an appealing effort from Jeeva Shankar and Vijay Antony." The Behindwoods Review Board gave the film 2.5 out of 5, calling it a "suspense thriller that works for most parts." Deccan Chronicle stated that "Vijay Antony changes beat". Sify rated it average, calling it a "decent psychological thriller."

Upon release, it was noted that the film had been inspired by the 1999 American film The Talented Mr. Ripley.

=== Other languages ===
It was remade in Bengali as Amanush 2 which released in April 2015. The Kannada remake, Asthitva was released in 2016.

== Awards ==
Ceremony	Category	Winner	Result
2nd South Indian International Movie Awards	Best Music Director	Vijay Antony	Nominated
2nd South Indian International Movie Awards	Best Debutant Producer	Vijay Antony	Nominated
2nd South Indian International Movie Awards	Best Male Debutant	Vijay Antony	Nominated

== Legacy ==
A sequel to the movie was released in August 2014 called Salim. In March 2014, it was reported that the film would be remade in Hindi with Prashanth reprising Vijay Antony's role. Despite a production delay, Thiagarajan confirmed during an interview that the film would be made in February 2017.
