= Bommalattam (2008 film) =

2008 Tamil-Hindi film by Bharathiraja

- Poster in Tamil
- Directed by: Bharathiraaja
- Written by: Bharathiraaja
- Produced by: Paul Pandian; Dr. Raj T. Rajan
- Starring: Arjun Sarja; Nana Patekar; Rukmini Vijayakumar; Kajal Aggarwal
- Cinematography: B. Kannan
- Edited by: K. M. K. Palanivel
- Music by: Songs: Himesh Reshammiya; Score: Monty Sharma
- Production company: Therkathi Kalaikoodam
- Release dates: 12 December 2008 (Tamil); 21 October 2016 (Hindi)
- Country: India
- Languages: Hindi; Tamil

Bommalattam is a 2008 Indian Tamil-language thriller film written and directed by Bharathiraaja. The film stars Arjun Sarja and Nana Patekar, with Rukmini Vijayakumar, Kajal Aggarwal, Niyamat Khan, Vatsal Sheth, Ranjitha and Manivannan in supporting roles. Himesh Reshammiya composed the music and cinematography was done by B. Kannan. It was simultaneously shot in Hindi, with Mushtaq Khan in place of Manivannan; however, the Tamil version was mostly dubbed from Hindi. Bommalattam was released it on 12 December 2008, while the Hindi version, originally titled Cinema, was retitled Final Cut of Director and had a limited release on 21 October 2016. While Bommalattam was a success, Final Cut of Director failed financially.

== Plot ==
Film director Rana is filming a scene with the female lead of his upcoming film, Cinema. Rana is unhappy with the actor's behaviour, and he decides to find another female lead. He finally finds Trishna suitable but never discloses her identity to the media, and the film's wallpapers do not show the names of the male and female leads. The film is eventually completed, and Rana must attend a press meeting about his film's release. However, he does not attend the meeting and is shown to have had an illegal relationship with Trishna. At this juncture, the film's producer calls Rana, and the media discovers his location and who he is with. Press reporters gather at the hotel where Rana is staying; he escapes from them and gets into a car. The press chase him, and Rana kills Trishna by creating an accident-like situation.

SP Vivek Varma, a Central Bureau of Investigation (CBI) officer, takes charge of this murder case along with two previous murder cases in which Rana is also a suspect. Rana is arrested and taken into CBI custody, and Vivek interrogates him. Meanwhile, a poet named Anitha, a superfan of Rana, is revealed to be Vivek's lover and worked as Rana's assistant during his filmmaking. During the interrogation, Rana reveals how he met Trishna and their relationship.

Trishna was a dancer who performed in temples and at small-time shows across Andhra Pradesh. Rana hires Trishna as his muse, and they become lovers. When a hairdresser is left homeless, Rana offers her a place in his room; another unit member sees this and informs Rana's wife. The next morning, as Rana is shooting with Trishna, his wife arrives, beats up the hairdresser, and accuses Rana of being a womaniser. Rana continues filming, unperturbed by the incident but cries while instructing his actors. His assistant notices this; she and Rana are also shown to be lovers, and she comforts him. In the village where they are filming, the village chief is notorious and constantly lusts after Trishna. Rana says he will kill the chief if he causes more trouble. The next day, the chief is murdered. Vivek recalls this and states Rana committed this murder, but Rana neither agrees with nor denies this statement.

Rana faints shortly after the interrogation and is taken to the hospital. Vivek follows him there and recollects the incident of the second murder. After finishing their schedule at the village, the unit travels to Malaysia to continue the filming. There, Rana meets the financier's son, who is also the film's second male lead. The son flirts with Trishna and constantly tries to approach her, which makes her uncomfortable. Shortly afterwards, the financier's son is also found murdered, and Rana again neither agrees nor denies this murder. Upon witnessing what Vivek is doing, Anitha confronts him and accuses him of trying to pin Rana down. Anitha offers Vivek her body in exchange for him leaving Rana alone. Vivek tells Anitha about the complications of the investigation. A badly burnt body in a car that fell from a cliff belongs to a man, and all of the evidence at the crime scene is fake and used as props for filmmaking.

With the mystery unsolved, Rana is released due to the lack of strong evidence to convict him. He goes to live in a secluded bungalow with his assistant. Vivek follows Rana there and uncovers the mystery. Trishna is revealed to be a man named Krishna from a very poor background. Krishna's mother raised him as a girl, so his demeanour has become feminine since he was small. Rana sees an opportunity to introduce Krishna as a female hero and provide financial aid to his struggling family. Krishna killed the village chief, who discovered Krishna's true sex and demanded Krishna have sex with him in return for concealing the truth. Krishna also killed the financier's son, who falsely told Krishna he had photographed Krishna while he was bathing. Rana asks Vivek to give Krishna the lightest available sentence, but Vivek decides to release him. Rana thanks Vivek, who says Rana is a greater human than a director.

== Cast ==
- Arjun Sarja as Vivek Varma IPS, SP in CBI
- Nana Patekar as Rana
- Rukmini Vijayakumar as Trishna / Krishna
- Kajal Aggarwal as Anitha
- Niyamat Khan as Rana's shooting assistant
- Vatsal Sheth as Nitish Kumar
- Ranjitha as Rana's wife
- Mushtaq Khan as the village chief (Hindi)
- Manivannan as the village chief (Tamil)
- Baby Ankitha as Rana's daughter
- B. Kannan as a doctor and himself (uncredited)
- Vivek as Madurai (Tamil version only)
- Chitra Lakshmanan as Rana's makeup man (Tamil version only)
- Joe Malloori as Rana's crew member (uncredited; Tamil version only)

== Production ==
The film was launched in Malaysia in 2006 with the title Cinema for the Hindi version and Bommalattam for the Tamil version. Bharathiraja decided to make the film in Hindi after casting Nana Patekar. Initially planned to be filmed only in Hindi, Bharathiraja decided on a Tamil version as well. Arjun Sarja was cast as a police officer. Rukmini Vijayakumar was cast in an important role. Cinema was based on a true incident that took place in Hampi. Bharathiraja recalled that he and Patekar often had disagreements during filming, but after seeing the finished product, Patekar appreciated Bharathiraja. He also said it was Arjun who frequently helped mediate their differences. Cinema and Bommalattam were originally supposed to mark the lead and Tamil debut of Kajal Aggarwal, respectively. However, the delay of the film meant that Lakshmi Kalyanam (2007) and Pazhani (2008) were released first.

== Soundtrack ==
The soundtrack was composed by Himesh Reshammiya. Reviewing Bommalatam's music, Saraswathy Srinivas of Rediff.com rated it 2.5/5 and wrote, "To conclude, Reshammiya's maiden attempt at Tamil music tries to conjure a youthful fare by employing trendy beats and contemporary style but hardly rises to exemplary heights".

Tamil version

Lyrics by Snehan, Thenmozhi Das and Viveka.

Track listing
No.	Title	Singer(s)	Length
1.	"Aaha Aaha"	Karthik, Pop Shalini
2.	"Check Check"	Suchitra
3.	"Nenjil Dola"	Anuradha Sriram
4.	"Va Va Thalaiva"	Gayathri
5.	"Koyambedu"	Mathangi

Hindi version

Lyrics by Sameer.

Track listing
No.	Title	Singer(s)	Length
1.	"Zindagi"	Sunidhi Chauhan
2.	"Dhola Dholiya"	Afsar, Sneha Panth
3.	"Chakle Chakle"	Akriti Kakar
4.	"Aaha Aaha"	Himesh Reshammiya, Manjeera Ganguly
5.	"Leja Leja"	Gayatri Iyer Ganjawala

== Release ==
Poster of the Hindi version

Bommalattam remained unreleased until Nag Ravi of Insight Media intervened and released it on 12 December 2008. The Hindi version was renamed Final Cut of Director and was released on 21 October 2016 after a ten-year delay. While Bommalattam was successful, Final Cut of Director went largely unnoticed and failed at the box office.

== Critical reception ==
Ayyappa Prasad of Nowrunning wrote, "Like aged and mellowed spirits, director Bharati Raja has matured and levitated towards one of his first loves—a whodunit". Sify wrote, "hats off to Bharathiraja for creating a taut thriller which is a masterpiece of moods, anxieties and dread. Quite simply, unmissable." Pavithra Srinivasan of Rediff.com wrote, "Bharathiraja's screenplay lacks punch. He seems to have been confused about whether to give importance to the characters themselves, or the thriller portion." Malathi Rangarajan of The Hindu wrote, "The pluses of Bommalattam place Bharatiraaja on a pedestal. The minuses play spoilsport." She added, "It's obvious that many of the scenes have been filmed in Hindi alone—flawed lip sync makes a mockery of some of the serious scenes".
