= Ananda Thandavam =

2009 film by Gandhi Krishna

Anandha Thandavam
- Directed by: A. R. Gandhi Krishna
- Written by: A. R. Gandhi Krishna; Sujatha
- Produced by: V. Ravichandran
- Starring: Siddharth Venugopal; Tamannaah Bhatia; Rukmini Vijayakumar; Rishi
- Cinematography: Jeeva Shankar
- Edited by: V. T. Vijayan
- Music by: G. V. Prakash Kumar
- Distributed by: Aascar Film Pvt. Ltd
- Release date: 10 April 2009
- Country: India
- Language: Tamil

Ananda Thandavam (transl. Dance of Happiness) is a 2009 Tamil-language romantic drama film directed by A. R. Gandhi Krishna and produced by V. Ravichandran of Aascar Films.

An adaptation of Sujatha's serialized novel Pirivom Santhippom, the film stars Siddharth Venugopal, Tamannaah Bhatia, and Rukmini Vijayakumar. The love story of Raghu (Siddharth) and Madhu (Tamannaah) captured the hearts of many, prompting Sujatha to write the second part due to high reader demand. The music was composed by G. V. Prakash Kumar with editing by V. T. Vijayan and cinematography by Jeeva Shankar.

The film was released on 10 April 2009 to mixed reviews and became a commercial failure at the box office.

== Plot ==
Raghupathi, whose mother died in childbirth, grows up with plenty of affection from his father. He becomes a quiet, sensible, and somewhat serious person. His father is a government-employed deputy chief engineer of the Ambasamudram dam, Tirunelveli, while Raghu is a mechanical engineer. However, he is frustrated because he is unemployed. One day, after returning from an interview in Pune, he meets Madhumitha. She is naive, plays childish pranks, and brings energy into his life. Madhu is the elder daughter of the dam's new chief engineer and his arrogant wife, who want a very comfortable life for the family.

Madhu's parents also bring joy to Raghu's life as they accept who he is, and eventually, he finds good employment in Pune. He suddenly gets engaged to Madhu without informing his father. Raghu leaves for work in Pune. When he returns a month later, trouble comes in the form of 'Rad' Radhakrishnan, a spoilt NRI businessman from the United States who was on vacation in Papanasam. Rad had seen Madhu and was enticed by her beauty and her parents' wealth, and made a proposal to her parents. Seeing a better life for Madhu, her parents agreed to cancel Raghu's engagement. Worst of all, Madhu, being immature herself, agreed with her parents' opinion and decided to marry Rad.

The fake reason given by Madhu's family is that Raghu's father has an illicit relationship with their maid Jayanthi, who is a year older than Raghu. Jayanthi, having a baby with a husband who left her, also clouds Raghu's judgement. Moreover, when Raghu asks Madhu to elope with him, she agrees but cancels it at the last hour, stating the same reason. Raghu, heartbroken, attempts to commit suicide by jumping down a waterfall. He survives with temporary injuries. His father berates him and says that Jayanthi's mother breast-fed him, and she is like his own daughter. He took care of Jayanthi just because her husband had left her pregnant. Also, Madhu had visited him while he was in a coma. She had already married and left for the US with Rad. Six months later, with further encouragement from his father and friends, Raghu leaves for New York City to get his MBA at NYU. He has to stay in the mansion of Mohanram, his father's childhood friend. Mohan is a rich divorcee and successful online share trader.

Mohan's niece Ratnakumari receives Raghu at the airport and drops him off at home. Ratna, though brought up in the USA since the age of seven, wants to marry an Indian man and return to India. She is intelligent, beautiful, social, and cultured. Raghu starts his MBA course and befriends another Tamil guy named Natraj. However, at the end of the day, Raghu's benchmate, a Korean, kills his ex-girlfriend and then himself before Raghu's eyes. Then, a mob tries to mug Raghu, but Ratna saves him. Raghu then asks Mohan to put him back on the next flight home. Mohan says that he cut his own left leg to escape from the Twin Towers on 9/11. His company fired him and provided compensation, which his wife took as a divorce settlement. Still, he did online share trading and has earned around $20 million in 10 years. He shows his prosthetic leg and says that Raghu's father spent his life savings to send Raghu to New York. This motivates Raghu to stay in New York.

Weeks later, Raghu sees Madhu at a Tamil association function. Madhu reconciles with Raghu and gives him an iPhone 4. Both go on a trio trip to Atlantic City after Rad cancels at the last minute. While returning home, Madhu drops Raghu at her home and leaves to buy groceries. There, Raghu is shocked to find that Rad has been cheating on Madhu. He resolves to tell her the truth, but Madhu is blinded to Rad's faults because of respect for him. She accuses him of still having feelings for her, insulting him, and causing another argument between them. As months pass, Raghu and Ratna become close, and their families decide to get them engaged. As time progresses, Madhu discovers that her husband has been cheating on her, which has led her to be in constant abuse by him, leading her to live life with misery. One day, Madhu escapes from Rad and goes to meet Raghu. Unfortunately for her, Raghu gets engaged to Ratna the very same day. Unable to bear any more sadness, Madhu ends up cutting her veins and begging Raghu to take her back. Ratna intervenes, and Madhu asks for Raghu. Ratna is disgusted and complains to her family. They come and take Raghu away, leaving Madhu devastated, drunk, and bleeding through her veins. Madhu then kills herself through reckless driving.

At the airport, everyone is gathered, and Madhu's parents are collecting the coffin with Madhu's body. Rad tries to lie to Madhu's parents, saying he was perfect to her in every way and cannot understand why this happened. Meanwhile, Raghu, who had also come to see Madhu's body, arrives. He gets enraged and charges at Rad with a security guard's revolver, but then finds out that it is locked. Madhu's parents apologize to Raghu that their daughter's suicide was caused by their own greed and betrayal, and take Madhu's body to India. Outside the airport, Ratna consoles Raghu and tells him she loves his relationship commitment more than him.

== Cast ==
- Siddharth Venugopal as Raghupathi
- Tamannaah Bhatia as Madhumitha
- Rukmini Vijayakumar as Ratnakumari Raghupathi, Raghupathi's wife
- Rishi as Radhakrishnan
- Kitty as Raghu's father
- Amitha Rajan as Madhumitha's mother
- Tirlok Malik as Hindu Priest
- Rama Natarajan as Mohanram, Ratna's uncle
- Raghuram as Ratna's father
- Ammu Ramachandran as Jayanthi
- Madan Bob
- Srinath
- Charle
- Kalairani
- Bala Singh
- Five Star Krishna
- Aditi Sriram as Mohanram's first child
- Sanchaya Satish as Mohanram's second child
- Sanjana Satish as Mohanram's third child
- Ann Marie Seall as Jennifer
- Kaveh as Police Officer

== Production ==
A. R. Gandhi Krishna, a former assistant to Shankar in Sivaji, made his directorial debut with the film Chellamae. Sujatha wrote the dialogue for the screenplay before his death. Filming began on location in Ooty, then moved to Tenkasi, Kuttralam, Ambasamudram, Papanasam and Malaysia. G. V. Prakash Kumar scored the music for the movie, while award-winning lyricist Vairamuthu penned the lyrics. Vairamuthu said that one of his best recent works was the song he wrote for this film. He said, "On reading the lines, Gandhi Krishna was floored totally and was in fail of words". Ananda Thandavam was produced by Aascar Films' Suresh Shanmugam. Shankar, who worked as an associate to the late cinematographer Jeeva, was "cranking the camera".

The satellite rights of the film were sold to Kalaignar TV.

== Soundtrack ==
The songs were composed by G. V. Prakash Kumar. "Kana Kangiren" received a massive response from the audience and became one of the top songs of the year. All lyrics written by Vairamuthu.

Track listing
No.	Title	Singer(s)	Length
1.	"Poovinai"	Srinivas, Shreya Ghoshal	5:31
2.	"Pattu Poochi"	Naresh Iyer	4:59
3.	"Kallil Aadum"	Benny Dayal, Shweta Mohan	5:15
4.	"Kana Kaangiren"	Nithyashree Mahadevan, Shubha Mudgal, Vinitha	5:46
5.	"Megam Pola"	Shankar Mahadevan	4:28
6.	"Ananda Thandavam Theme"	G. V. Prakash Kumar, Naresh Iyer	2:03
Total length:			28:02

== Critical reception ==
Sify gave 2/5 stars and said, "One wish Gandhi Krishna had whipped up a winsome more believable screenplay on the bitter-sweet nature of romance. All we end up with is some homily about old fashioned virtues of deep love." Rediff.com also gave 2/5 stars, saying, "Anandha Thandavam aims to be an intricate story of three people caught in an eternal triangle. Though its scores in parts for sensitivity, the overall effect is rather lacking in enthusiasm."
