= Shashidhar Kote =

Indian singer, musician and actor

- Born: Kalanja village, Mangalore, Karnataka, India
- Other names: Bengaluru Ratna, Gayana Mantrika, Vishwamanava, Gana Gandharva, Kannada Saarathi, Gana Gandharva, Gana Garudiga, Aryabhata Shreshta Gayaka, Sangeetha Rathna
- Citizenship: India
- Occupations: Singer, musician, actor, teacher
- Known for: Kote Music and Arts Foundation
- Website: www.kotemusic.com

Shashidhar Kote is an Indian singer, musician and actor.

== Personal life ==
Kote was born to Havyaka Brahmins parents, Kote Vasanth Kumar and Parvathi Kote, in Kalanja village, Mangalore, Karnataka. He had his master's degree in English literature from Mangalore University. He taught literature in the same university later for three years. Being a singer in the Mysore maharaja's court, he received honors from the king.

He is married to Seetha Kote, and has a son.

== Career ==
Kote's was trained in music by Satyabhame, Gopalkrishna Iyer and Vid. Gurudutt. He sings in Kannada, Telugu, Tamil, Malayalam and Hindi languages. As of 2010, Kote had performed in more than 4,000 concerts.

=== Geetha Chitra ===
Kote organizes an event named ′Geetha Chitra′, where music and painting programs are held. Artist B. K. S. Verma paints the subject of the song Kote sings. The event gained popularity in Bangalore, Chennai and Mumbai.

=== Selected filmography ===
- Madhuram Milanam Mounam (2018–19)
- Asthitva (2016)

=== Television ===
Kote has been a host in TV reality shows as, Little Star Singer, Sangeetha Lahari, Hadondu Haduvenu and Sangeetha Sambrahma.

==== Serials ====
- Triveni Sangama
- Meenakshi Maduve
- Kanaka
- Gejjepooje
- Bhagyalakshmi
- Paaru
