= Gandhi Krishna =

Indian film director

- Born: Ranga Samudram, Gudiyatham
- Occupation: Director
- Years active: 1997-present

Gandhi Krishna is an Indian film director who has worked on Tamil films. After beginning his career as an assistant to Shankar, he has made commercially and critically successful films.

== Career ==
After apprenticing under Shankar in Indian (1996), Gandhi Krishna approached writer Sujatha to allow him to adapt his novel Pirivom Sandhipom into a screenplay. Sujatha refused the offer citing that film makers had often misinterpreted his novels' characters, so the plan was consequently dropped. Gandhi Krishna then began work on his first venture, a social drama film titled Engineer in late 1997. Touted as a big-budget project, the film starred Arvind Swamy and Madhuri Dixit and was based on a story regarding the building of a dam project in South India. The film ran into financial trouble after eighty percent of the film's shoot had been completed and has since remained unreleased. In 1999, director Shankar, the mentor of Gandhi Krishna, attempted to revive the project through his production house but was unsuccessful in doing so. A further attempt was made to restart the project with Suriya in the lead role in 2004, but it also failed to materialize.

Subsequently, Gandhi Krishna made his directorial debut through the art film Nila Kaalam (2001), a coming-of-age television film starring children. Based on Sujatha's novel Andru Un Arugil, the film won a National Film Award and received critical acclaim, with a reviewer from The Hindu stating the film "is a must for one and all" and that Gandhi Krishna tackles the "theme confidently". He next made the romantic thriller, Chellamae (2004), featuring newcomer Vishal in the lead role alongside Reemma Sen and Bharath. The basic premise of the plot was taken from a line from the Ramayana, with Bharath portraying the antagonist. Unlike his first venture, Chellamae was made to entertain audiences and prompted a positive response from critics as well as at the box office.

Gandhi Krishna finally ended up making Pirivom Sandhipom from mid-2007 as Ananda Thandavam (2009), starring rookie actors Siddharth Venugopal, Tamannaah Bhatia and Rukmini Vijayakumar. Despite being promoted heavily prior to release, the film garnered negative reviews and performed poorly at the box office. A critic from Rediff.com noted "though its scores in parts for sensitivity, the overall effect is rather lacking in enthusiasm". In 2012, it was reported that Gandhi Krishna had taken over as the director of the fantasy film Karikalan from L. I. Kannan. The film, which starred Vikram, Zarine Khan and Radhika Apte, had been in production since 2010 but has failed to restart even after Gandhi Krishna's appointment. In 2026, his romance film Breakfast was released.

== Filmography ==
Year	Film	Notes
1997	Engineer	Shelved
2001	Nila Kaalam	
2004	Chellamae	
2009	Ananda Thandavam	
2026	Breakfast	
