= Breakfast (film) =

2026 Tamil-language Indian film

- Theatrical release poster
- Directed by: Gandhi Krishna
- Written by: Gandhi Krishna
- Produced by: Girija Varadaraj
- Starring: Raanav; Rosmin Thadathil; Krithik Mohan; Amitha Ranganth
- Cinematography: M. V. Panneerselvam
- Edited by: S. Bhaaskar; Sujith
- Music by: G. V. Prakash Kumar
- Production company: Prem Classic Pictures
- Release date: 24 April 2026
- Running time: 123 minutes
- Country: India
- Language: Tamil

Breakfast is a 2026 Indian Tamil-language romance film written and directed by Gandhi Krishna. The film stars newcomers Raanav and Rosmin Thadathil alongside Krithik Mohan and Amitha Ranganth. It was theatrically released on 24 April 2026.

== Plot ==
Breakfast is a relationship drama told through a frame narrative. The story begins with Rishab and Lakshmi, a married couple whose relationship has deteriorated to the point that they are seeking a divorce. As part of the legal process, they meet marriage counsellor Gangadevi. Instead of offering conventional advice, she tells them another couple's story, hoping it will help them reflect on their own marriage. The film then follows the young couple whose marriage starts with love and optimism. As daily life progresses, financial stress, misunderstandings, poor communication, and growing egos slowly replace affection. Small disagreements escalate into major conflicts because neither partner is willing to listen or compromise. As the relationship worsens, emotional pain turns into domestic abuse. The wife suffers greatly, even during pregnancy, while the husband struggles with anger and frustration. The film portrays these scenes to highlight the destructive impact of violence, mistrust, and emotional neglect within a marriage Gangadevi uses this tragic story to show Rishab and Lakshmi how unresolved conflicts can destroy even relationships that began with genuine love. The message is that marriages often fail not because of one major incident, but because of accumulated hurt, pride, and the inability to communicate honestly.

== Cast ==
- Raanav as Shantanu
- Rosmin Thadathil as Jhanvi
- Kasthuri Shankar as Gangadevi
- Sampath Raj as Muralidharan
- Archana as Maha
- Krithik Mohan
- Amitha Ranganth as Lakshmi
- Balaji Sakthivel as a Judge
- Vinodhini Vaidyanathan as a Judge
- Poster Nandakumar as Minister
- Ravi Mariya as Sindhooran
- Madhan Bob as Veera Babu

== Production ==
The film was written and directed by Gandhi Krishna, who also handled the screenplay and dialogues. It is produced by Girija Varadaraj, with Dinesh Kumar K. V serving as co-producer under Prem Classic Pictures. Cinematography is handled by M. V. Panneerselvam, while editing is done by S. Bhaaskar and Sujith.

== Soundtrack ==
The music was composed by G. V. Prakash Kumar.

Track listing
No.	Title	Lyrics	Singer(s)	Length
1.	"Idhayam Thudikiradhe"	Vairamuthu, Vivek	G. V. Prakash Kumar, Karthika Vaidyanathan
2.	"Thee Piditha Thendral"	Vairamuthu	Rahul Nambiar, Saindhavi
3.	"Hold Me So Tight"	Vivek	Benny Dayal, Neeti Mohan

== Reception ==
Dina Thanthi wrote that director Gandhi Krishna has captured attention by telling an emotional story from the perspective of the younger generation. The Times of India rated the film 1.5/5 stars and wrote, "There are fleeting sparks in the film, especially in the characterisations". The critic said the music "lacks life" and the film "does try to experiment with camera work here and there. But these technical touches do not help a film without a believable and emotional core. The film ends up as a tonally confused drama with little emotional depth". Dinamalar gave the film 2/5 stars.
