= Thiru Thiru Thuru Thuru =

- Poster
- Directed by: Nandhini JS
- Written by: Nandhini JS
- Starring: Ajmal Ameer; Rupa Manjari
- Cinematography: Sudhir K. Chaudhary
- Edited by: Sathish Suriya
- Music by: Mani Sharma
- Production company: Sathyam Cinemas
- Distributed by: Sathyam Cinemas
- Release date: 25 September 2009
- Country: India
- Language: Tamil

Thiru Thiru Thuru Thuru (transl. Mr. Mr. Rust Rust) is a 2009 Indian Tamil-language romantic comedy film written and directed by newcomer Nandhini JS. Starring Ajmal Ameer and newcomer Rupa Manjari, the film, produced by Sathyam Cinemas, was released on 25 September 2009.

== Plot ==
Srinivasan (Mouli) is an owner of a loss-making advertising agency. To make his company stand up he expects a great project from big company Johnson and Johnson. During a meeting for the project discussion Arjun (Ajmal Ameer) the art executive and a pet of Srinivasan, disappoints the clients with his mischievous behaviour. To convince the clients who are reluctant to give the project to them, Srinivasan produces the ad at his own risk with his own money, on the agreement that the project will be accepted if everything is done perfectly.

The baby who is scheduled to act in the ad gets sick and Arjun and his colleague Archana try to find a new baby, else shooting will be cancelled. Arjun finds a cute baby on the road and asks his mother, who refuses the proposal. While convincing, the mother faces an accident. Arjun admits her in the hospital and meanwhile takes the baby to the client and gets their approval. Arjun returns to hospital to find the mother and found that she left without caring about the baby. Arjun takes the baby to the police station and discusses the issue with police friend. He then takes the baby to his home accompanied by Archana. The ad shooting is finished, but awaits client approval who demands written no objection agreement duly signed by the baby's parents within next three days to avoid future issues, else the project will not approved and money spent will also not be compensated.

Arjun and Archana find that the lady, from whom Arjun took the baby is not his real mother, rather a baby stealer. Both of them set to Pondicherry to search for her to find who the baby's real parents are. They find her finally, but the lady denies their charge of baby stealing. By some non-violent tortures they grab the details of the real parents. The lady stole the baby from the parents and she along with her boyfriend demand twenty lakh rupees from them to return to them and while on the mission she lost the baby to Arjun. The kidnapper diverts them saying that he is the real parent to Arjun and also orders the baby's parents to give them the money and pick up the kid in a separate remote place. Arjun and Archana arrive there, find something wrong and run away with the baby. Both of them are finally trapped among the kidnappers, parents and the police.

The due date for handing over the agreement finally comes and Srinivasan, unable to catch Arjun finally admits that he could not produce the agreement and therefore he quits from the project, while Arjun and Archana arrive there with the document and finally the project gets approved. Actually Arjun and Archana were misunderstood as kidnappers and caught by police. They explain who they are and show the ad film taken with the baby. The parents are very happy on getting back their baby and seeing their child in the ad and sign the agreement. Arjun and Archana finally unite and romance each other.

== Cast ==
- Ajmal Ameer as Arjun
- Rupa Manjari as Archana
- T. S. B. K. Moulee as Srinivasan
- Lakshmi Ramakrishnan as Kavitha Sreenivasan
- Yog Japee as John
- D. R. K. Kiran as SI Deva
- Lollu Sabha Balaji as fake Mahesh
- T. M. Karthik as Mute hospital worker
- Baby Darshan as Gayathri Mahesh
- Narendra as Kumar
- Aravind as Mahesh
- Deepa Narendra as Lakshmi Mahesh
- M. Monisha as Sarala
- Sairam as George
- P. S. Sabrish as Michael
- George Maryan as Watchman
- Janani Iyer as Background Model (cameo appearance)

== Production ==
Thiru Thiru Thuru Thuru is the first film produced by Sathyam Cinemas.

== Soundtrack ==
The music composed by Mani Sharma.

Song	Singers	Lyrics
"Adhiri Pudhiri"	Janani Madhan, Rahul Nambiar	Lalithanand
"Doctor Maappillai"	Naveen, Ranjith	Lalithanand
"Jillenu Veesum"	Haricharan, Saindhavi	Lalithanand
"Thiru Thiru Vizhiyae"	Karthik, Rita Thyagarajan	Yugabharathi
"TTTT Theme Song"	Ranjith, Saindhavi	Lalithanand

== Reception ==
A critic from Rediff.com rated the film two-and-half out of five stars and wrote that "T4 has a load of mush, fluff and frothiness but that's pretty much it. The film never takes itself seriously. It's the kind of movie you watch when there's nothing else to". A critic from The Times of India Rated the film three out of five stars and wrote that "Racy dialogues, perfect chemistry between the lead pair, a cool performance by Mouli and the torture of the kidnapper all keep you glued. But the eerie boot bungalow scenes slow down the pace". A critic from The New Indian Express wrote that "Sathyam Cinemas and Real Image deserves pat for producing a simple movie sans violence. The movie lacks intensity and coherence but it provides some fun".
