= Amanush 2 =

2015 Indian Bengali film

- Film poster
- Directed by: Rajiv Kumar Biswas
- Screenplay by: Anindya Bose
- Story by: Jeeva Shankar
- Produced by: Mahendra Soni; Srikant Mohta
- Starring: Soham Chakraborty; Payel Sarkar; Rajesh Sharma; Surajit Sen
- Edited by: Anindya Chatterjee
- Music by: Arindam Chatterjee
- Production company: Shree Venkatesh Films
- Release date: 14 April 2015
- Running time: 145 minutes
- Country: India
- Language: Bengali

Amanush 2 (transl. The Inhuman 2) is a 2015 Bengali crime thriller film directed by Rajib Kumar Biswas. It is a sequel to Amanush with different storylines but the same background and synopsis. The film is a remake of the Tamil film Naan which starred Vijay Antony in the lead. The film is released on 14 April 2015.

As early as July 2014, director Biswas spoke toward actress Payel Sarkar being a major character in the film. Filming took place in Chennai. The movie was not successful at the box office.

== Plot ==
A good student in school, Raghu's (Soham Chakraborty) problems begin when his father commits suicide, after finding out that his wife, Raghu's mother, had been cheating on him with Raghu's home tutor. Seeking revenge, he sets his house on fire, killing his mother and tutor and ending up in a juvenile home. Upon his release, he heads to Kolkata to start a new life and befriends Saleem, a medical student. But Saleem dies when the bus they are travelling in gets involved in an accident. Seeing an opportunity, Raghu impersonates Saleem and joins the medical college. There, he also makes new friends, Suresh and Ashok, and comes across Ashok's girlfriend Riya (Payel Sarkar), a gorgeous and educated young girl. Raghu falls for Riya's heavenly beauty and charm and gets attracted to her. One day, the gang comes across the juvenile home warden, who recognizes Raghu and reveals his real identity.

Following this, Raghu runs into an unwanted fight with Ashok, his roommate, after his attempts to hide his identity went in vain and thereby accidentally killing Ashok. Realizing he has no other option, Raghu hides Ashok's body and buries it somewhere he felt was safe. This would be the beginning of a long story of him trying to hide the truth from coming out.

== Cast ==
- Soham Chakraborty as Raghu/Salim (two identities)
- Payel Sarkar as Ria, Ashok's girlfriend
- Anindya Chatterjee as Ashok Sen
- Rajesh Sharma as Inspector Tarafdar, Investigating officer
- Surajit Sen as Arjo Ganguly, Ashok's friend

== Production ==
=== First look and trailer ===
The first look was released on The Times of India on 11 October 2014, and the trailer was released on 14 Mar 2015 on Shree Venkatesh Films's official YouTube channel and on Sangeet Bangla.

=== Promotion ===
The film was promoted on two anticipated shows of the Bengali television, Dadagiri Unlimited and Didi No. 1.

== Soundtrack ==
Songs are composed by Arindam Chatterjee. One song (Shotti Ke Mitthe Bole sung by EPR Iyer) was retained from the song "Thappelam Thappe Illai" from Naan Tamil soundtrack by Vijay Antony which was sung by Hiphop Tamizha & Santhosh Hariharan.

All lyrics are written by Prosen; all music is composed by Arindam Chatterjee.

Track listing
No.	Title	Singer(s)	Length
1.	"Thanda Du Chokh"	Anupam Roy	3:36
2.	"Shotti Ke Mitthe Bole" (Thapellam Thape Illai from Naan)	EPR Iyer	3:22
3.	"Keno"	Arijit Singh	3:42

== Critical reception ==
Madhushree Ghosh of The Times of India reviewed "There are two reasons why you can spend one evening watching Amanush 2 and not regret later — Soham's impressive return after last year's Golpo Holeo Sotti and a gripping storyline that keeps you glued to your seats till the end. Thankfully, like most commercial Bengali films, Amanush 2 steers clear of the typical song and dance routine, an arm-candy heroine or a ruthless villain with a country's supply of weapons at his disposal. And if these don't excite you enough, the film has a brilliant Anindya Chatterjee (as Raghu's friend Ashok), who leaves a lasting impression once again after Chotushkone. However, this film too has its share of flaws. It is predictable to a great extent, which takes away the charm of a thriller. Paayel Sarkar, as Ashok's girlfriend Riya, looks worn out. Even her heavy make-up, trendy clothes couldn't camouflage her disinterested performance. Otherwise, it is a good one-time watch."
