= Engineer (film) =

Shelved film by Gandhi Krishna

- Directed by: Gandhi Krishna
- Written by: Sujatha
- Produced by: J. S. Ramachandra Rao
- Starring: Arvind Swamy; Madhuri Dixit; Napoleon
- Cinematography: Jeeva
- Edited by: K. Thanigachalam
- Music by: A. R. Rahman
- Country: India
- Language: Tamil

Engineer is a shelved Indian Tamil-language film directed by Gandhi Krishna and written by Sujatha originally slated to be released in 1999. Based on the true incidents revolving around the Sardar Sarovar Dam project, the film would have starred Arvind Swamy and Madhuri Dixit, with music composed by A.R. Rahman and cinematography and editing being handled by Jeeva and K. Thanigachalam respectively.

It was originally filmed in Tamil with dubbed versions in Telugu and Hindi. The film was shelved after 80 percent of shooting was completed.

== Plot ==
The original film was based on a dam being built across a village. The story of the film is set in a village that faces the threat of perishing if the dam is constructed. The engineer (played by Arvind Swamy) undertakes the project for corporate interests. The wife of the engineer (Madhuri Dixit), fights against insensitive authorities that do not seem to be concerned with villagers' woes. She is left numb when she learns that her husband is also a part of the dam project.

== Cast ==
- Arvind Swamy
- Madhuri Dixit
- Napolean
- Nassar
- Goundamani
- Senthil
- Bala Singh

== Production ==
The film was announced on 16 January 1997 with the film's shooting beginning a week later. Initially the production team had offered the film to Madhuri Dixit, but she declined due to the controversial aspects of the subject. After the Supreme Court order on the Sardar Sarovar dam project, Gandhi approached Dixit with renewed interest and she agreed to play the role, thus marking her debut in Tamil cinema. The costumes of the film were handled by fashion designer duo Anu-Aneez. Graphics artist Venky had worked in the film to multiply crowds, clone characters and serve up a 3-D song sequence.

The film ran into financial trouble after 80% of the film's shoot had been shot and has since remained unreleased. Director Shankar, mentor of Gandhi Krishna, attempted to revive the project through his production house, as well as producer Kalaippuli S. Thanu, but was unsuccessful in doing so. The film became one of three Arvind Swamy projects which ran into financial troubles in the mid-1990s, with only Sasanam being belatedly released in 2006. The other venture, Azhagam Perumal's Mudhal Mudhalaaga had also featured music by A. R. Rahman and a leading Hindi actress Karisma Kapoor, like Engineer.

In 2002, the makers attempted to revive the project and agreed dates with Madhuri Dixit. However, the film did not restart production.

== See also ==
- List of abandoned and unfinished films
