= Salim (film) =

2014 Indian film by N. V. Nirmal Kumar

- Directed by: N. V. Nirmal Kumar
- Written by: N. V. Nirmal Kumar
- Story by: Thayanidhy Sivakumar (dialogue)
- Produced by: R. K. Suresh; M. S. Saravanan; Fathima Vijay Antony
- Starring: Vijay Antony; Aksha Pardasany
- Cinematography: Ganesh Chandhrra
- Edited by: Rajesh Kumar
- Music by: Vijay Antony
- Production companies: Studio 9 Production; Vijay Antony Film Corporation
- Distributed by: Sri Green Productions
- Release date: 29 August 2014
- Running time: 155 minutes
- Country: India
- Language: Tamil

Salim is a 2014 Indian Tamil-language action thriller film directed by N. V. Nirmal Kumar. It stars Vijay Antony and Aksha Pardasany. Produced by Studio 9, Sri Green Productions and Vijay Antony Film Corporation, the film serves as a direct sequel to Vijay Antony's debut film Naan (2012). The film was released on 29 August 2014. It got positive reviews from critics.

== Plot ==
The plot continues two years after the incidents in Naan. Karthik, alias Mohammed Salim, a bright student from Ramanathapuram, is an honest doctor at a private hospital in Chennai. Now a good Samaritan, Salim often goes out of his way to help needy patients who visit him. His skill and nature earn him the wrath and jealousy of his colleagues. One day, he learns that someone is stalking him and finds it is his suitor Nisha. Salim goes directly to Nisha and gives her his personal diary so she can learn more about him. This response from Salim impresses Nisha so much that she falls in love with him. As their relationship progresses, Nisha learns that Salim has dedicated himself to his work, so much so that he fails to take care of her and spend time with her, thus creating a rift between them. To reconcile with Nisha, Salim plans to spend a whole day with her. They go to a movie theatre, and some goons tease Nisha, but Salim chooses to take Nisha and leave the place. Nisha gets offended and starts to ignore Salim and his phone calls.

Meanwhile, the hospital's managing director warns Salim to stop refusing fees from poor patients as it affects the hospital's income. A few days later, Salim reconciles with Nisha, and they renew their relationship. Nisha invites Salim to a party, and he accepts. But, on the way, Salim sees a young girl, a gang rape victim, who is hurt and bleeding on the road. He takes her to the hospital and misses the party. Nisha loses her temper and breaks up with him.

The next day, Salim finds that the girl was discharged from the hospital by the managing director as she is poor and unable to pay for her treatment. The same evening, Salim gets an invitation to a party from his hospital. Salim learns that the managing director has had enough of his charity and generosity at the hospital's cost. Salim also learns that he is being sacked, and it is his own farewell party. He is also insulted by the managing director for not using his talent and reputation to earn money. Salim storms out of the party in rage. On the way, he gets into a scuffle with a police officer and hits him, ending up in the police station. But he escapes with the police officer's pistol and goes straight to a hotel. There, he finds four men trying to rape the hotel's singer. He beats them up and helps the girl leave the place. Saying that they have to learn their lesson, Salim takes them hostage inside the room. One of the men, Guru, is the son of Home Minister Thavapunniyam, so the police, led by officer Chezhian, are pressured to take immediate action.

The police discover Salim's identity and raid his home, where they find his wedding card and learn about Nisha. They take her into custody and to the hotel, where she meets Chezhian and explains Salim's character and that he is not a terrorist to take hostages. The police plan to use Nisha as bait and capture Salim, but they fail to do so when Salim demands the presence of Thavapunniyam at the hotel. Meanwhile, a police sniper shoots at Salim but misses, and Salim throws one of the men out of a window. He tells Chezhian to take him seriously to avoid more disastrous results. It is later revealed that the four men had raped the girl whom Salim had found on the roadside. After her discharge from the hospital, they killed the victim and her mother and disposed of their remains in a sewage drain.

Salim realises he will not be left alive by Thavapunniyam once he lets go of the hostages. So he demands a car for him to leave and tells the police not to follow him. This time, Thavapunniyam arranges a car fitted with a bomb and a remote detonator. Salim continues to hold Guru hostage and gets into the latter's car instead. Later, Thavapunniyam receives a call from Guru telling him that Salim left him on the East Coast Road and escaped. Thavapunniyam orders his men to bring Guru back and kill Salim, who has driven away and made it look like an automobile accident. The men chase the car with trucks and crash into it, only to find Guru inside.

== Cast ==
- Vijay Antony as Dr. Mohammed Salim (earlier Karthik)
- Aksha Pardasany as Nisha
- R. N. R. Manohar as Home Minister Thavapunniyam
- Swaminathan as Swaminathan
- Aruldoss as Police Officer
- P. V. Chandramouli as Chezhian
- Sushmitha
- Arandhai Rajagopal
- Premji Amaren as himself (Cameo appearance) in the song "Avala Nambithan"
- Priya Asmitha in the Item number "Mascara"
- Ram Rajendran as Police Control Room (PCR) Operator

== Production ==
After his debut venture Naan, Vijay Antony decided to start Salim. He plays the role of a doctor while Aksha Pardasany was signed on to portray his fiancé in the film, making her Tamil film debut. Since the movie required Vijay Antony to perform some dare devil stunts, he underwent rigorous training in Taekwondo for a period of two months. The first schedule of the film's principal photography was in Chennai in June 2013.

== Soundtrack ==
Salim

Soundtrack album by Vijay Antony
- Released: 5 June 2014
- Recorded: 2013–2014
- Genre: Feature film soundtrack
- Length: 21:21
- Label: Saregama
- Producer: Vijay Antony

Vijay Antony chronology
Kathai Thiraikathai Vasanam Iyakkam (2014)	Salim (2014)	Aavi Kumar (2015)

The music of the film was composed by Vijay Antony. The soundtrack album was released at Sathyam Cinemas, Chennai on 5 June 2014, with Bharathiraja, Bala, M. Raja, R. K. Selvamani and R. Parthiepan among others attending the event. Behindwoods gave 2 out of 5 and called the album "a mixed bag from Vijay Antony".

No.	Title	Lyrics	Singer(s)	Length
1.	"No One Is Perfect (Reused from Naan)"	Instrumental	Instrumental	2:56
2.	"Unnai Kanda Naal Mudhal"	Annamalai	Supriya joshi, Hemachandra, Srinivasan	5:05
3.	"Siva Sambo (Avala Nambithana)"	Gana Bala	Mahalingam, Emcee Jesz	4:12
4.	"Mascara Pottu"	Priyan	Supriya joshi, Sharmila, Vijay Antony	4:53
5.	"Ulagam Unnai"	Annamalai	Prabhu Pandala	4:07
Total length:				21:21

== Release ==
Salim was released on 29 August 2014 in around 400 screens across the country, including Kerala and Karnataka, with close to 300 screens in Tamil Nadu. Gopuram Films and Sri Production distribute the film in India. It was released in about 50 screens in the overseas space in key countries, through Suara Networks.

== Critical response ==
The film has received generally positive reviews from critics. Baradwaj Rangan from The Hindu wrote, "The director, N. V. Nirmal Kumar, subscribes to a rather charming theory: things just happen. Nisha just happens to morph into a ghost. Salim just happens to get arrested by a cop...Salim just happens to visit an old man, who dies a few scenes later, having served little purpose other than to demonstrate another facet of Salim’s goodness. If he (Salim) was really that good, he’d have refunded my ticket money by now". The Times of India gave 3 stars out of 5 and wrote, "Vijay Antony is definitely not an expressive actor but with Naan earlier and now Salim, he has managed to find roles where impassiveness is a trait of the character...The first half of Salim nicely sets up what's in store...It is only in the second half that things get somewhat cinematic". The New Indian Express wrote, Salim may not have the best of scripts, but with its racy pace and twists, it manages to keep one glued to the screen for the most part". Sify wrote, " Salim is a decent enough thriller that compensates for its weak first half by a smarter second half and some composed acting by Vijay Antony". Behindwoods in its review stated, "This is not the first time that Tamil Cinema witnesses such a plot, however the way Salim is treated, manages to keep the audiences engaged", calling it a "watchable average movie". Moviecrow stated, Salim is definitely a sound choice by Vijay Antony as a follow-up to Naan". Indiaglitz.com wrote, "The film is clean and thought-provoking, and is certainly worth the time invested".
