= Chellamae =

2004 film by Gandhi Krishna

- Poster
- Directed by: Gandhi Krishna
- Written by: Story & Screenplay: Gandhi Krishna; Dialogues: Sujatha
- Produced by: V. Gnanavelu; Jayaprakash
- Starring: Vishal; Reema Sen; Bharath
- Cinematography: K. V. Anand
- Edited by: V. T. Vijayan
- Music by: Harris Jayaraj
- Production company: GJ Cinema
- Release date: 10 September 2004
- Running time: 156 minutes
- Country: India
- Language: Tamil

Chellamae (transl. Oh darling) is a 2004 Indian Tamil-language romantic thriller film written and directed by Gandhi Krishna, while the dialogues were written by Sujatha. The film stars Vishal (in his acting debut) and Reema Sen, while Bharath plays the antagonist. Vivek and Girish Karnad play supporting roles. It revolves around Mythili (Sen) who, despite being married to Ragunandan (Vishal), is obsessively pursued by Vishwa (Bharath).

The music of Chellamae was composed by Harris Jayaraj, cinematography was handled by K. V. Anand and editing by V. T. Vijayan. The film was released on 10 September 2004.

== Plot ==
Mythili showers love and affection on her neighbour Vishwa since childhood. Vishwa is the only son of a business tycoon named Rajasekhar and lost his mother at a young age. Mythili treats Vishwa as her younger brother and spends all her time with him. Ragunandan, an income tax inspector, turns up at Rajasekhar's house for an IT raid and happens to meet Mythili there. They eventually fall in love, and after a series of incidents, they get wedded and later settle in Goa. The trouble begins when Vishwa reaches Goa in search of Mythili. He manages to kidnap her and bring her to Chennai. The reasons for Vishwa's obsession and possessiveness towards Mythili unfold as the movie progresses. Ragunandan, who comes back to Goa, finds the house deserted. The next-door neighbour tells him that Mythili eloped with Vishwa. He then begins tracking her down and finds that the duo has left for Chennai. Ragunandan reaches Chennai, and with the help of his colleague Harichandra, he tries to trace Mythili out. A chance look at the video of their marriage throws light on Vishwa's hatred towards Ragunandan. Ragunandan is convinced that Mythili did not go of her own will. He confronts Rajasekhar, but he is of no help. Finally, he traces out the location of Vishwa's hideout. Mythili pleads with Vishwa to release her. She explains that she cannot be his wife and can see him as a son or younger brother. The plea falls on deaf ears. In a racy climax on high seas, the three protagonists fight it out, and Mythili hits Vishwa with the boat oars. He plunges into the sea in an unconscious condition, taking Mythili along. Ragunandan soon saves her. Even though Mythili had killed Vishwa because of her attack on him, she is filled with remorse.

== Cast ==
- Vishal as C. Ragunandan
- Reema Sen as Mythili Ragunandan (Voice dubbed by Renuka Kathir)
  - Reshmi Menon as Young Mythili
- Bharath as Vishwa Rajasekhar
- Vivek as Harichandra, Ragunandan's friend
- Girish Karnad as Rajasekhar, Vishwa's father (Voice dubbed by Kitty)
- Sriranjani as Vaishnavi, Ragunandan's sister
- Crane Manohar
- Sampath Ram as Kumar
- K. P. Mohan as Dr. K. Bangaru Babu
- Boys Rajan as Income Tax Officer
- Mumtaj as herself (guest appearance)
- Bhanupriya in a special appearance in song "Kummi Adi"

== Production ==
Newcomer Vishal was signed to work on the film, after Arjun, under who Vishal worked as assistant director in Vedham, encouraged Vishal to accept the role. Bharath was cast in the role of "obsessed teenage lover" for the first time. Majority of the shoot was held in Goa while it was also shot at places like Chennai, Maldives, Mumbai and Bangkok and was completed in 50 days.

== Soundtrack ==
The music was composed by Harris Jayaraj.

All lyrics are written by Vairamuthu.

Tamil track listing
No.	Title	Singer(s)	Length
1.	"Aariya Udhadugal"	Hariharan, Swarnalatha	5:32
2.	"Chella Kiliyo"	Ranjith, Anuradha Sriram	4:17
3.	"Kadhalikkum Aasai"	Kay Kay, Timmy, Mahathi, Chinmayi (Humming only), Premgi Amaren	4:25
4.	"Kummiyadi"	Sandhya	5:43
5.	"Vellaikkara Mutham"	Mahathi	5:01
Total length:			24:58

Telugu track listing
No.	Title	Lyrics	Singer(s)	Length
1.	"Aaryula Hrudayapu Sannidhi"	Veturi	P. Unnikrishnan, Swarnalatha	5:30
2.	"Muddula Chilaka"	Sahithi	Devi Sri Prasad, Anuradha Sriram	4:15
3.	"Venditeralo Bulliteralo"	Chandrabose	Chakri, Chinni, Timmy, Mahathi, Chinmayi (Humming only)	4:25
4.	"Gummadamma Kanne Gummadamma"	Sahithi	Sandhya	5:38
5.	"Pettadey Oh Muddu"	Veturi	Mahathi	4:45
Total length:				24:33

== Release and reception ==
Sify wrote, "The story and screenplay of Gandhi Krishna is somewhat in the manner of Yash Chopra's Darr and so many other obsessive love stories. Still he has come out with a racy film that is sure to satisfy the youth audience and has been packaged strictly to suit their tastes". Malathi Rangarajan of The Hindu wrote, "Traces of "Guna" and "Kadhal Kondain" are evident in "Chellamae," but Gandhi Krishna's refreshing approach to the storyline gives the necessary spark to make the venture watch-worthy till the end". Malini Mannath of Chennai Online wrote, "Gandhi Krishna's apprenticeship under Shanker seems to have been a fruitful one, he having picked up the right ingredients, and extracting excellent team work from his cast and crew, to make Chellamay, an engaging entertainer". Visual Dasan of Kalki wrote that by taking the outline of the epic Ramayana, the director had given it an interesting plot set in a contemporary setting, strong incidents, seamless character creation, and a flawless script. G. Ulaganathan of Deccan Herald wrote, "Director Gandhikrishna is a surprise. His direction and screenplay is fast paced and ensures that there is never a dull moment in the film. K V Anand’s camera brilliantly captures the beauty of Andamans. Harris Jayaraj’s music is an asset to the movie".

Chellame ran for 100 days. It was made with a budget of ₹3.5 crore and collected a share of ₹6 crore selling 3 million tickets worldwide. The film was dubbed and released in Telugu under the title, Prema Chadarangam (transl. Love Chess).
