= Rukmini Vijayakumar =

Indian dancer and actress (born 1986)

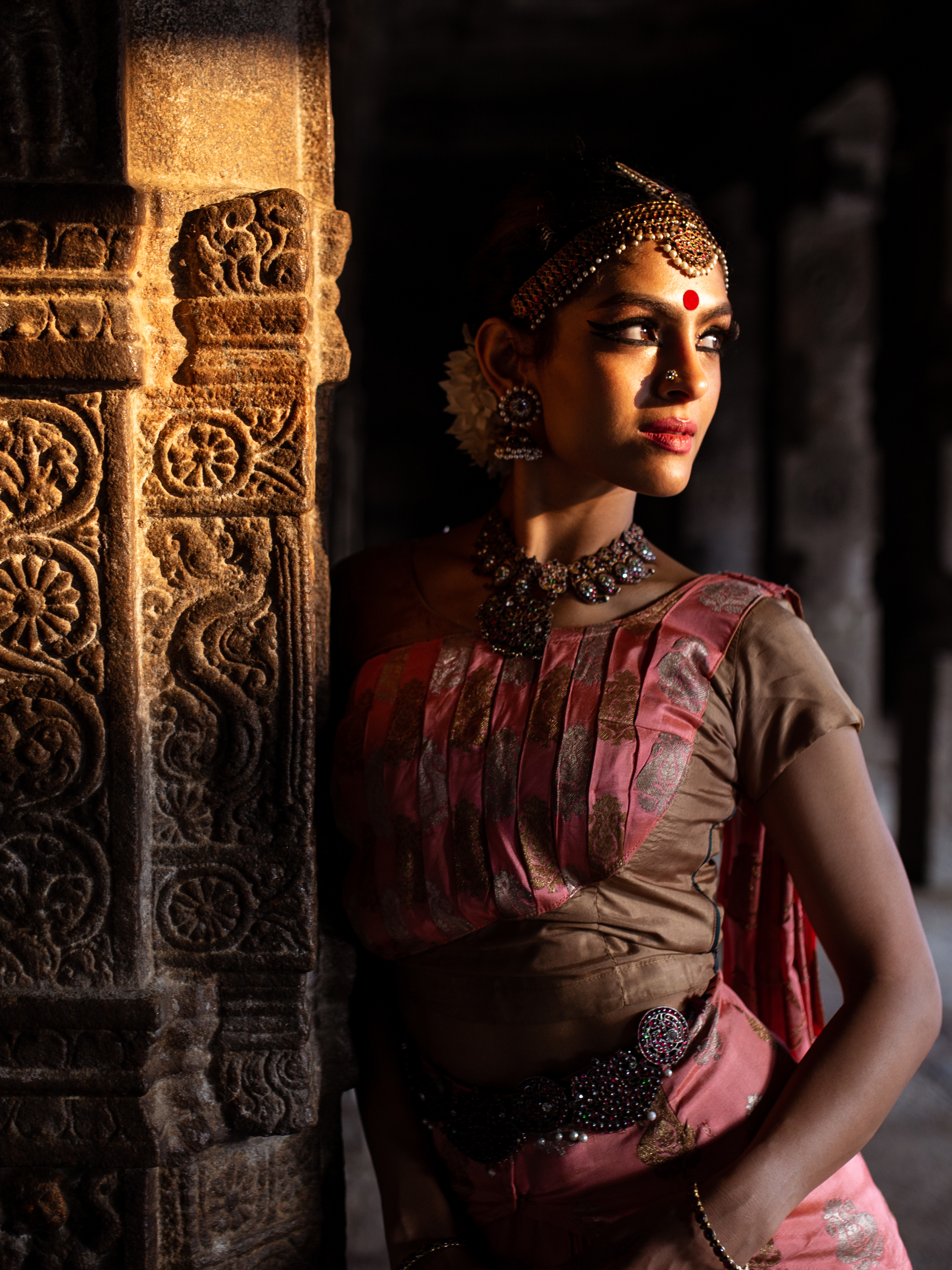
- Rukmini Vijayakumar in Tanjavur in 2019
- Born: Rukmini; Bengaluru, Karnataka, India
- Occupations: Dance choreographer; dancer; actress
- Years active: 2008–present
- Spouse: Rohan Menon

Rukmini Vijayakumar is an Indian choreographer, Bharatanatyam dancer, and actress. Along with her performances on stage, she has appeared in films such as Ananda Thandavam (2009), Bhajarangi (2013), Kochadaiyaan (2014), Final Cut of Director (2016), Kaatru Veliyidai (2017), and Sita Ramam (2022).

Rukmini is the artistic director of Raadha Kalpa dance company, and the director of LshVa, an art space. She is the founder of The Raadha Kalpa Method, a pedagogical system of training classical Indian, and particularly Bharatanatyam, dancers.

Rukmini's approach to Bharatanatyam is dedicated, rigorous and layered. She has presented her work as a soloist all over the world, including venues such as the Jacobs Pillow festival, Drive East NYC, and the Korzo Theater. Recently she played ‘the goddess of love’ in ‘Sukanya’, produced by The Royal Opera house in London.

== Career ==
She studied Bharatanatyam under Guru Narmada, Guru Padmini Rao and Guru Sundari Santhanam. She practiced the Karanas for several years under Guru Sundari Santhanam, a senior disciple of Guru Padma Subramanyam. Rukmini holds a BFA degree from the Boston Conservatory in Ballet and Modern dance. She has studied acting at the New York Film Academy, Los Angeles while also learning under director Prakash Belawadi during her stay in India. She has studied subjects on Fitness Training at UCLA and Anatomy and Physiology at The Boston University.

Rukmini's process of creation is both traditional and contemporary. She was a recipient of the Jiri Kylian grant for choreography and a resident choreographer at Korzo theater, Netherlands in 2018. Her productions, aniruth, Prabhavati, Abhimata, Talattu and The Dark Lord have toured b India and the world extensively. Her more recent work, Turiya, MALA, The Muse and Unrequited were created within the contemporary idiom and have been appreciated for their creative approach to the bharatanatyam vocabulary.

She made her debut in Gandhi Krishna's 2009 romantic film Ananda Tandavam as Ratna alongside Siddharth Venugopal and Tamannaah, but the film was a commercial and critical failure. Rukmini then signed up to appear in Naan, once again alongside Siddharth Venugopal, but the film ran into production trouble and she opted against appearing in the film when it began again in 2010. Moreover, another project, Oru Naal Podhuma directed by Pratap Pothan and featuring Madhavan in the lead role, was also cancelled soon after announcement.

In 2012, Rukmini was approached for Rajinikanth's sister's role in Kochadaiyaan. The role was earlier to be enacted by Sneha, who opted out citing date issues. In 2016, her delayed Hindi suspense thriller film Final Cut of Director (also partially made in Tamil as Bommalattam) by Bharathiraja released. In the film, she plays Trishna alongside an ensemble cast of Arjun, Nana Patekar and Kajal Aggarwal. The film features her as a mysterious debutant actress who is hidden from the media, with the film eventually revealing that her character was actually a male, made to dress up by the director. The film opened to positive reviews, with critics terming her performance as "definitely a surprise package".

== Personal life ==
Rukmini was married to Rohan Menon.

== Dance productions ==
Year	Production	Notes
2009	Megham	A duet based on the emotional physical impact of water in our lives
2010	Shankarabharanam	A duet on the symbolism of the ornaments of Shiva
2011	Raadha	A duet inspired by Munshi's Krishnavatara
2011	Raadha Rani	An ensemble work on aspects of Radha
2011	Kanhaa	A physical, emotive response to the idea of Krishna
2012	Krishnaa	A devotional solo on the surrender to Krishna
2012	Andal	A solo based on the life of the Tamil saint Andal
2013	"Nayani" The resonance of the Omniscient	An ensemble work on the elements of nature and the presence of Shiva
2014	Prabhavati	An ensemble work, created in a dance theater format inspired by the Telugu novel, 'Prabhavati Pradyumnam'
2015	Yama	A trio that exemplifies the idea of the passage of time in a fast-paced life
2015	A maargam	An ensemble work created in the traditional format of a Margam
2016	Turiya	A trio that explores the three states of consciousness
2016	Abhimata	A solo that explores the various relationships that we share
2017	The Dark Lord	An ensemble work inspired by the lives of Meera, Andal and Radha
2017	MALA	A solo that explores momentum and rhythm in the bharatanatyam vocabulary
2017	Shankarabharanam	Revisited as an ensemble work
2018	Unrequited	Premiered in Korzo theater, Netherlands, an abstraction of Sati and Shiva.
2018	Talattu	Premiered in Milapfest, Liverpool, a solo on Yashoda and Radha.

== Filmography ==
Year	Film	Role	Language	Notes
2008	Bommalattam	Trishna / Krishna	Tamil	Partially reshot version
2009	Ananda Thandavam	Ratnakumari Raghupathi "Ratna"	Tamil	
2013	Bhajarangi	Krishne	Kannada	Debut Kannada film
2014	Kochadaiyaan	Yamuna Devi	Tamil	
2015	Shamitabh	herself	Hindi	Debut Hindi film
2016	Final Cut of Director	Trishna / Krishna	Hindi	
2017	Kaatru Veliyidai	Dr. Nidhi	Tamil	
2021	Natyam	Herself	Telugu	Cameo appearance
2022	Sita Ramam	Rekha Bharadwaj	Telugu	
2022	Thimayya & Thimayya	Herself	Kannada	Cameo appearance
