= Jeeva Shankar =

Indian cinematographer and director

- Born: Shankar
- Occupations: Cinematographer; director
- Years active: 2001–present

Jeeva Shankar is a cinematographer turned writer, director active in Tamil films. His prominent films include Naan and Amara Kaaviyam.

In 2013, he started an untitled project for Escape Artist Motion Pictures. Jeeva Shankar's next project after that was Yaman.

== Career ==
He started his career as an assistant cinematographer to Jeeva. His debut film Naan was initially launched in 2008, with Siddharth Venugopal portraying the lead role with Rukmini Vijayakumar playing the lead female role, however due to the failure of his previous film Ananda Thandavam, the producer Oscar Ravichandran called off the project. The film restarted with Vijay Antony's intervention in December 2010 who also took the lead role from Siddharth Venugopal. The film received positive reviews from critics and did well at box-office.

Following the critical and commercial success of his previous project Naan, director Jeeva Shankar wrote a new script titled Amara Kaaviyam, a college love story set in the 1980s. Madhan of Escape Artistes Motion Pictures was to produce the film, while Yuvan Shankar Raja was announced as the music composer. Adharvaa was announced to play the lead role but consequently opted out during pre-production stages, and the production house dropped the film.

Jeeva Shankar replaced him with Sathya in September 2013 with Sathya's brother, Arya producing the film under his production house, The Show People. Malayalam actress Miya was signed to play the female lead role, making her debut in Tamil films. The film began production in October 2013 in Ooty, with costume designer Sai preparing clothes for the film's 1980s backdrop. However, the film received negative reviews and went unnoticed.

== Filmography ==
Year	Film	Language	Credited as		Notes
Year	Film	Language	Director	Cinematographer	Notes
2001	Ammo Bomma	Telugu	No	Yes	
2003	Kadhal Dot Com	Tamil	No	Yes	
2009	Ananda Thandavam	Tamil	No	Yes	
2012	Naan	Tamil	Yes	Yes	
2014	Amara Kaaviyam	Tamil	Yes	Yes	
2017	Yaman	Tamil	Yes	Yes	
2022	Lucky Man	Kannada	No	Yes	
