= Kottaipattinam =

Human settlement in India

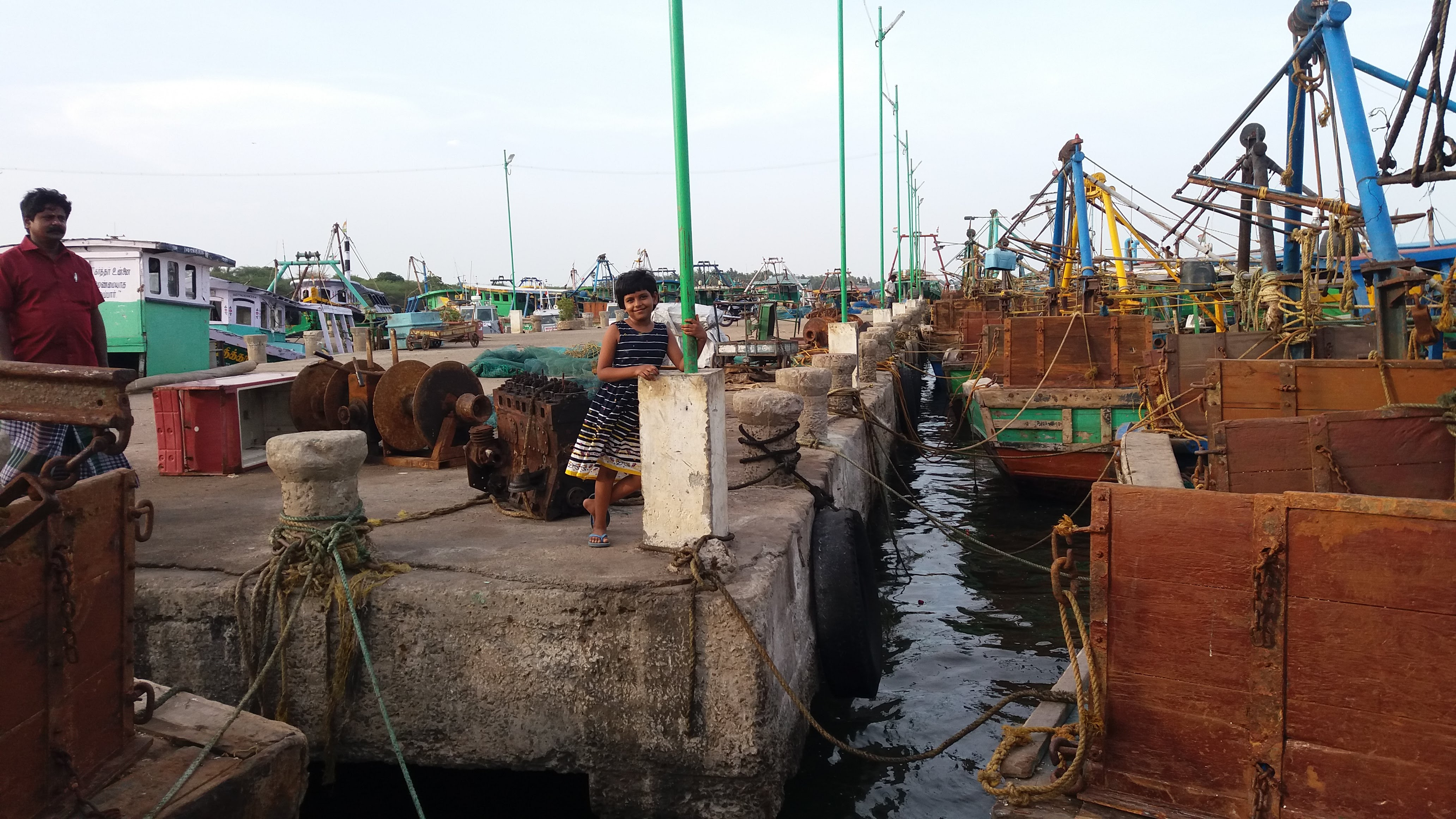

Kottaipattinam is a village panchayat located in the Pudukkottai district of Tamil Nadu state, India. The latitude 9.97908 and longitude 79.198595 are the geocoordinate of the Kottaipattinam. The Kottaipattinam Population is 13454. Male is 6668. Female is 6786.

== Geography ==
Kottaipattinam is located around 61.1 kilometers away from its district headquarter Pudukkottai. The other nearest district headquarters is Sivaganga situated at 13.0 km distance from Kottaipattinam . Surrounding districts from Kottaipattinam are as follows.

- Ramanathapuram ( ramanathapuram ) district 79.0 km.
- Sivaganga ( sivaganga ) district 79.6 km.
- Thanjavur ( thanjavur ) district 89.7 km.
- Tiruchirappalli ( tiruchirappalli ) district 90.2 km.

Chennai is the state capital for Kottaipattinam village. It is located around 366.3 kilometers away from Kottaipattinam. Kottaipattinam is in the UTC 5.30 time zone and it follows Indian Standard Time (IST).

== Demographics ==
=== Languages ===
The native language of Kottaipattinam is Tamil and most of the village people speak Tamil. Kottaipattinam people use Tamil language for communication.

== Transport ==
=== By Air ===
Kottaipattinam's nearest airport is Thanjavur Air Force Station situated at 83.6 km distance. Few more airports around Kottaipattinam are as follows.

- Thanjavur Air Force Station 83.6 km.
- Tiruchirappalli International Airport 102.2 km.
- Madurai Airport 122.5 km.

=== By Rail ===
The nearest railway station to Kottaipattinam is Ayingudi which is located in and around 28.9 kilometers away. The following table shows other railway stations and its distance from Mamakudi.

- Ayingudi railway station 28.9 km.
- Arantangi railway station 30.3 km.
- Valaramanikkam railway station 33.5 km.
- Peravurani railway station 34.1 km.
- Kandanur Puduvayal railway station 41.9 km.

== Education ==
Schools in Kottaipattinam has been listed as follows.

- Government Higher Secondary School
- Government High School (Girls)
- M.H.Higher Secondary School

== Nearest town/city to Kottaipattinam ==
Kottaipattinam's nearest town/city/important place is Perumagalur located at the distance of 20.6 kilometer. Surrounding town/city/TP/CT from Kottaipattinam are as follows.

- Aranthangi 36 km.
- Devakottai 55.0 km.
- Thondi 33.4 km.
- Pattukottai 55

The surrounding nearby villages and its distance from Kottaipattinam are Karakathikottai 2.4 km, Manamelkudi 2.4 km, Minnamozhi 2.7 km, Ammapattinam 5.4 km, Seyyanam 6.3 km, Manalmelkudi 8.0 km, Vellur 9.0 km, Mumpalai 10.2 km, Kolendram 11.6 km, Bramanavayal 13.5 km, Sathiyadi 14.6 km, Krishnajipattinam 15.6 km, Nilayur, Nerkuppai, Edayathoor, Manaloor, Vichoor, .
