= Rupa Manjari =

Indian actress

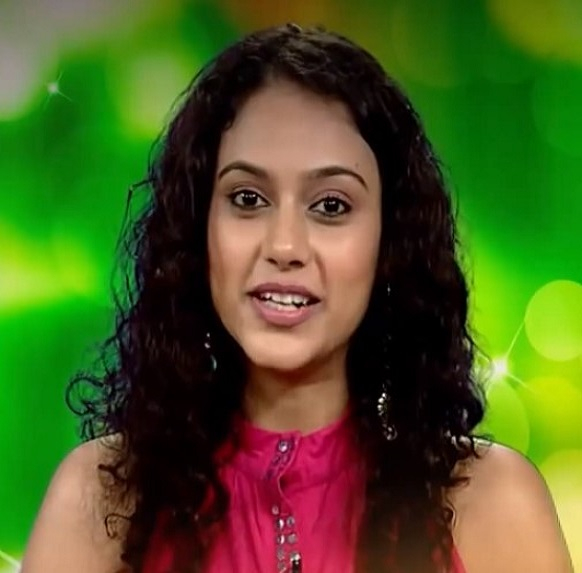
- Manjari in 2014
- Born: Sri Rupa Manjari; Bangalore, India
- Occupations: Film actress, model
- Years active: 2009 - 2015
- Height: 5.5 ft (168 cm)

Rupa Manjari is an Indian former actress who has appeared in Tamil as well as Malayalam films. Her mother tongue is Tamil. She made her debut in Nandhini's film Thiru Thiru Thuru Thuru (2009), before playing the leading roles in Naan (2012) and Yaamirukka Bayamey (2014).

== Career ==
Rupa Manjari got a chance to meet Nandhini and auditioned for Thiru Thiru Thuru Thuru and that the movie was well received. It took four months for her to be chosen from over 30 other girls who had also auditioned. The film, a romantic comedy, pitted her opposite Ajmal and featured the pair looking for a lost baby. Rupa was nominated for the Vijay Award for Best Debut Actress Award for her performable and a critic described her portrayal of Archana as that she "brings her character vibrantly to life with all the nuances of anger, humour, tenderness and soft romance".

She was next seen in the 2010 Malayalam film Tournament directed and produced by Lal. She played a wildlife photographer who meets a bunch of men who have been selected for a cricket tournament. The film opened to negative reviews and performed poorly at the box office. She was seen in the long-delayed Vijay Antony starrer Naan having a song Nila Nila and was a part of video for the successful promotional song, "Makkayala Makkayala", which was released online. The film started production in early 2010 and released in 2012. It got positive reviews from critics. In 2012 she was also seen in two Malayalam films Mallu Singh and she did a small guest appearance in the Malayalam filmI Love Me. The first film in 2014 for her was the commercially successful comedy-thriller movie, Yaamirukka Bayamey.

She has one film in Tamil, Sivappu in which she played a role as a construction worker.

== Filmography ==
Year	Film	Role	Language	Notes
2009	Thiru Thiru Thuru Thuru	Archana	Tamil	Won, Vikatan award for best debut actress Nominated, Vijay Award for Best Debut Actress
2010	Moscowin Kaveri		Tamil	Special appearance in "Gramam Thedi Vaada" song
2010	Tournament – Play & Replay	Ashwathy Alex	Malayalam	
2012	Mallu Singh	Pooja	Malayalam	
2012	Naan	Rupa	Tamil	
2012	I Love Me	Sameera	Malayalam	
2014	Yaamirukka Bayamey	Smitha	Tamil	
2015	Sivappu	Parvathi	Tamil	
