= Kabadadaari =

2021 film by Pradeep Krishnamoorthy

- Directed by: Pradeep Krishnamoorthy
- Story by: Hemanth M. Rao
- Based on: Kavaludaari (2019)
- Produced by: G. Dhananjayan; Lalitha Dhananjayan
- Starring: Sibi Sathyaraj; Nandita Swetha; Nassar; Jayaprakash
- Cinematography: Rasamathi
- Edited by: Praveen K. L.
- Music by: Simon K. King
- Production companies: Creative Entertainers and Distributors
- Release date: 28 January 2021
- Running time: 137 minutes
- Country: India
- Language: Tamil

Kabadadaari (transl. The One who disguises himself) is a 2021 Indian Tamil-language neo-noir thriller film written and directed by Pradeep Krishnamoorthy and produced by G. Dhananjayan. A remake of the 2019 Kannada film Kavaludaari, the film stars Sibi Sathyaraj along with Nandita Swetha, Nassar, Jayaprakash, Suman Ranganathan, and Pradeep Krishnamoorthy in supporting roles. The music and background score for the film is composed by Simon K. King, with cinematography handled by Rasamathi and editing done by Praveen K. L. It was simultaneously made in Telugu as Kapatadhaari with Sumanth in the lead role. The film released on 28 January 2021.

== Plot ==
Shakti is a traffic cop whose real interest lies in handling crime-related cases. One day, he accidentally comes across the skeletal remains of a three-member family, and decides to investigate the case without telling his senior officer. However, his plans hit roadblock when he gets to know that the remains are four-decades old. Forensic reports show that there are signs of struggle on the bodies, so it probably was a murder. His encounter with Kumar, a small-time journalist who is also interested in the case, helps him unfold the mystery. He finds out that the dead family's head is Suresh, the boss of an archaeology department. He worked with Sampath to uncover jewels from the Vijayanagara Empire. It was the same day in which Sampath was killed. On the same day, Suresh was found with a bloodstained shirt, so Shakthi realized that Suresh killed Sampath. The arrival of Ranjan, a retired cop, who investigated the case decades before, and actress Ramya into the plot, makes things complex for Shakti. Kumar tells Shakthi that Ramya is related to the case, so Shakthi goes to ask her questions. But, it proves unsuccessful. Ranjan decides to help Shakthi by giving him information from what he investigated. He reveals that Suresh actually didn't kill Sampath and that the blood on Suresh's shirt was from a wounded person whom Suresh had saved. Who killed Sampath, and how the family died still remains a mystery. Ramya was also killed later. When Ranjan and Shakthi went to investigate her house, they see a picture of Ramya wearing a necklace from the Vijayanagara Empire excavation. Then, they see a goon who breaks into the house. Shakthi and Ranjan chase after him.

When they follow the goon, it leads them to a resort. In a park near the resort, Ranjan recognizes a place where the car was originally burnt. Inside the resort, a political leader is giving a speech, and Shakthi gets a call from Kumar to meet him. Kumar tells him that before Ramya was an actress, she used to be a dancer who danced for criminals. One person had a deep connection with Ramya. He was Minjur Ranganathan, the upcoming Chief Minister. Meanwhile, Ranjan discovers that the Resort belongs to Minjur Ranganathan. Shakthi goes to inspect Minjur's old home to find more evidence. He finds holy Christian objects hidden in a high shelf. This confuses Shakthi because Minjur is a Hindu. He tells Ranjan, who goes to Minjur's campaign. He notices that Minjur looks like Fernandez, Suresh's old driver. In front of the crowd, he shouts "Fernandez" to which Minjur looks awkwardly at Ranjan. He gets scared and tells his goons to abduct him. Ranjan tells Shakthi everything, and then he is taken. Minjur explains to Ranjan that he found out that Suresh was holding a treasure worth 80 lakhs in his department, so he kills Sampath. And, just to make sure he gets away with the money, he plans to kill Suresh too. He tells Rayadu about his plan, but he doesn't tell him about Sampath. He tells Rayadu to put sleeping pills in the family's food, so they can make a run. But, what Rayadu doesn't know is that the pills are poisoned. The whole family dies, and Rayadu threatens to tell the police about what Fernandez did. However, the bag containing the pills had Rayadu's fingerprints, so he would also get in trouble. Fernandez takes their dead bodies in his car, buries them, and burns the car. He takes the jewelry and becomes rich. To make sure no one got suspicious, he changed his identity into Minjur Ranganathan.

After that, Minjur has his goons kill Ranjan. Shakthi comes, but he is too late and Ranjan dies. Before he dies though, Ranjan tells Shakthi what Minjur did. He gets very mad and kills Minjur's goons. He eventually finds out that Kumar is actually Rayadu. He goes to inquire this to Kumar, but Kumar's daughter comes, forcing Shakthi to leave. After this, he goes to Minjur to threaten him, but he actually goes there to work for Minjur. Minjur tells him to kill Rayadu/Kumar. On a car ride, he stops his car and shoots Kumar, but not before recording him telling everything about Minjur and Ramya. Kumar says that when he went to interview Ramya, one of Minjur's goons kill her because she knows about Minjur's past. After killing Kumar, Shakthi goes to Minjur's swearing ceremony and tells him that he killed Kumar. But, it turns out that Shakthi lied, and that he didn't kill Kumar. Kumar disguises himself and serves Minjur milk. Inside the milk, however, is poison. Minjur dies on the spot. When Shakthi and Kumar drive in the car, Kumar reveals that he drank the remaining poison because he feels very guilty. The recording Kumar made becomes viral, and everyone learns about Minjur and his past sins. Because of his work on this case, Shakthi gets promoted to a police officer in the crime branch. In the end, it is revealed that the man who Suresh saved all those years ago was actually Shakthi's dad, and that's why he was very interested in this case.

== Cast ==
- Sibiraj as Shakti
- Nandita Swetha as Swathi
- Nassar as Ranjan
- Jayaprakash as Kumar / Rayudu
- Suman Ranganathan as Ramya
- Charle as Thangapandi
- Sampath Maitreya as Fernandez / Minjur Ranganathan
- Sai Dheena as Mechanic
- Pradeep Krishnamoorthy as Henchman of Minjur Ranganathan
- J. Satish Kumar as Suresh
- Abhishek Shankar as A. C. P. Ravichandran
- Jeyavel as Constable Mani
- G. Dhananjayan as Gurumoorthy
- Sangeetha V as Geetha Ranjan
- Amrutha Abhishek as Vijayalakshmi
- Baby Anisha as Vaidhegi
- Yazar as Young Rayudu
- Joyice Baby as Shakti's mother

== Production ==
Producer G. Dhananjayan acquired the remake rights of Kavaludaari in early April 2019. On 23 August 2019, it was reported that Sibi Sathyaraj will be playing the lead role, along with his father Sathyaraj. The film was reported to be helmed by Pradeep Krishnamoorthy, whom Sibi worked with him in Sathya (2017). It was later announced that Sathyaraj will not be seen in the film, whereas Nandita Swetha, Nassar and Jayaprakash was added to the cast. On 23 October 2019, the makers announced the title of the film as Kabadadaari.

Principal photography began on 1 November 2019, and was reported to be wrapped up within 65 working days. Director Pradeep Krishnamoorthy makes his acting debut in this film. In November 2019, it was announced that the film will be simultaneously made in Telugu as Kapatadhaari, with Sumanth reprising the role.

The post-production activities of the film came to a halt due to the COVID-19 pandemic. On 11 May 2020, the makers resumed the dubbing portions of the film, thus, becoming the first film to resume the dubbing, following the safety guidelines imposed by the government. Producer Dhananjayan thanked Nassar on Twitter that he agreed to reduce from that salary by 15% and completed the dubbing. Production of film was delayed due to COVID-19 for almost 200 days and finally wrapped on 30 September 2020. This delay cost the producer over ₹1 crore through interest and other costs.

== Soundtrack ==
Kabadadaari

Soundtrack album by Simon K. King
- Released: 18 January 2021
- Recorded: 2020–2021
- Genre: Feature film soundtrack
- Length: 15:07
- Language: Tamil
- Label: Aditya Music
- Producer: Simon K. King

Simon K. King chronology
Market Raja MBBS (2019)	Kabadadaari (2021)	Kapatadhaari (2021)

Singles from Kabadadaari
- 1. "Hayakki Baby" Released: 11 December 2020

The music is composed by Simon K. King, continuing his association with Sibi Sathyaraj and Pradeep Krishnamoorthy, after Sathya (2017). The audio rights of the film were purchased by Aditya Music. The film's first song "Hayakki Baby" was released on 11 December 2020. It was sung by Sanah Moidutty, with lyrics written by Ku. Karthik, with English lyrics and rap verses were written and sung by Krishan Maheson.

The film's soundtrack features four songs written by the composer himself, along with Ku. Karthik and Arun Bharathi. It was released on 18 January 2021, at an audio release event held in Chennai. For the Telugu version of the film title Kapatadhaari, Simon was retained as the composer, and reused the same soundtrack for the film with lyrics by Vanamali.

No.	Title	Lyrics	Singer(s)	Length
1.	"Hayakki Baby"	Ku. Karthik, Krishan Maheson	Sanah Moidutty, Krishan Maheson	04:23
2.	"Kabadadaari"	Arun Bharathi	Niranj Suresh, Shilvi Sharon	03:37
3.	"Kanavil Kan Malarum"	Ku. Karthik	Pradeep Kumar	04:52
4.	"Kabadadhaari Theme"	–	Simon K. King	02:13
Total length:				15:07

== Release ==
It was initially scheduled to be released in May 2020, but was postponed due to the COVID-19 pandemic. On mid-September 2020, producer Dhananjayan, announced that the film was scheduled for a theatrical release in November, and refuted rumours of releasing on over-the-top media service. After the reopening of theatres across Tamil Nadu, with restrictions of 50% occupancy, Kabadadhaari was scheduled for a theatrical release on 25 December 2020, simultaneously along with its Telugu version, but was postponed due to various reasons. It was released on 28 January 2021, coinciding with the occasion of Thaipusam.

Baradwaj Rangan of Film Companion South wrote "The film isn't bad. But it's overlong, and without a strong sense of style, we are left with just the functional plot points."
