= Kevin Smokio =

Sri Lankan rapper

- Also known as: Smokio
- Born: Kevin Silva
- Origin: Colombo, Sri Lanka
- Education: Lumbini College
- Genres: Sinhala hip hop; Rap
- Occupation: Rapper
- Years active: 2010–present
- Website: smokio.com

Kevin Silva (Sinhala: කෙවින් සිල්වා), known professionally as Smokio, is a Sri Lankan rapper associated with the Sinhala hip hop scene. He is known for his work with the 44 Kalliya rap group and collaborations with Sri Lankan music producer Iraj Weeraratne and Costa.

== Career ==
=== Early career ===
Smokio began participating in Sinhala rap around 2010, according to a 2015 interview published by Wagmee TV. In the interview, he discussed his introduction to rap music and his involvement in the local hip hop scene.

By 2015, Smokio was associated with the 44 Kalliya rap group. Roar Media included him in its 2016 feature on Sri Lankan hip hop, describing him as one of the group's notable lyricists and discussing his growing recognition in the Sinhala rap scene.

=== 2016–present ===
In 2016, Smokio collaborated with Iraj on the single "Mudukkuwen Eliyata". The release was covered by Decibel in March 2016, which described Smokio as a Sinhala rapper who had been gaining attention in the local music scene.

He subsequently released music as a solo artist and collaborated with several Sri Lankan musicians. His releases include "Liya Liyaa", featuring Dilki Uresha, and "Kamini", featuring Ramesses Reezy and Tee Ceee.

In January 2022, he released "Colombo Rebellion", a track associated with his Sinhala rap career.

His subsequent releases include "100/100", "Savari" and "Kuddah". The latter was released in January 2026. In an interview published by The Morning, music video producer Wagmee discussed the production of "Kuddah" and reported that its music video reached one million views in less than 24 hours.

== Discography ==
=== Selected singles ===
Year	Title	Notes
2016	"Mudukkuwen Eliyata"	Collaboration with Iraj
2020	"Liya Liyaa"	Featuring Dilki Uresha
2021	"Kamini"	Featuring Ramesses Reezy and Tee Ceee
2022	"Colombo Rebellion"	
2025	"100/100"	
2025	"Savari"	
2026	"KUDDAH"	
