= Kolaigaran =

2019 Indian Tamil-language action thriller film by Andrew Louis

- Theatrical release poster
- Directed by: Andrew Louis
- Written by: Andrew Louis
- Produced by: B. Pradip
- Starring: Vijay Antony; Arjun; Ashima Narwal
- Cinematography: Mukeswaran
- Edited by: Richard Kevin
- Music by: Simon K. King
- Production company: Diya movies
- Distributed by: BOFTA Media Works
- Release date: 7 June 2019
- Running time: 111 minutes
- Country: India
- Language: Tamil

Kolaigaran (transl. Killer) is a 2019 Indian Tamil-language action thriller film directed by Andrew Louis. The film stars Vijay Antony, Arjun and Ashima Narwal, while Nassar and Seetha play supporting roles. The music was scored by Simon K. King. Principal photography of the film commenced on 5 June 2018. The film follows an investigation in which a woman and her mother are suspected of murder after a disfigured corpse is found, while their neighbour claims to have committed it instead, much to the surprise of cops. The film was released theatrically on 7 June 2019. It opened to positive reviews and became a super hit at the box office.

It is an uncredited remake of the 2012 South Korean thriller film Perfect Number, which was based on the 2005 Japanese mystery novel The Devotion of Suspect X by Keigo Higashino. The title card of the movie credited the movie to have been inspired by the novels The Devotion of Suspect X and Agatha Christie's The Body in the Library. Kross Pictures, the South Korean film company which held the adaptation rights of the novel and film, sued the makers of Kolaigaran and won a copyright infringement suit in 2019. Kross Pictures later themselves released Jaane Jaan, an official Indian adaptation of the novel and film in 2023.

== Plot ==
The movie begins with the murder of a mysterious woman by an unknown person inside a house. In another scene, Prabhakaran is seen surrendering to the police. The scene shifts to Prabhakaran's past. Prabhakaran and Dharini are neighbours, and each morning, they coincidentally greet each other as they step out to their respective workplaces. Although Dharini's friend, who sees this happen every day, warns her to be careful of Prabhakaran as she suspects this is a planned execution, Dharini dismisses her opinion as paranoid.

Meanwhile, a gruesome murder occurs at night in a desolate area in Chennai, where a man is killed and burned. The next day, the body is found by the locals, and a crime branch DCP Karthikeyan is assigned to the case. The police were not able to identify the murder victim due to his charred face; however, Karthikeyan finds the half-burnt tailor tag in the clothes of the victim and realises that the person is from a different city. He investigates complaints of missing guests at hotels within Chennai. From the information extracted from the tag, he discovers that the murdered man is Vamsi, the younger brother of an influential minister in Andhra Pradesh.

Looking into Vamsi's background, Karthikeyan learns that Vamsi is a habitual molester who used to stalk and harass Dharini, leading Dharini and her mother Lakshmi to escape to Chennai without his knowledge two years ago. Karthikeyan starts his investigation of Dharini and Lakshmi, who admit to their past connection with Vamsi, much to Karthikeyan's surprise. Similarly, Karthikeyan investigates Prabhakaran about the whereabouts of his neighbours on the date of the murder. Meanwhile, Prabhakaran contacts Dharini via his office desk phone and asks her to do as instructed.

Theoretically speaking, Karthikeyan firmly believes that the murder has something to do with Dharini and Lakshmi, and he also suspects they could not have done it on their own without a man's assistance. During his investigation, Karthikeyan also learns that Prabhakaran is a former Hyderabad-based IPS officer renowned for solving murder cases. When asked for help in solving the case, Prabhakaran says that he cannot provide any assistance. This strengthens Karthikeyan's suspicions of Prabhakaran, despite his team's opinions against the idea. In a sudden turn of events, Karthikeyan learns that Prabhakaran has surrendered for the murder. During interrogation, Prabhakaran reveals that he and Dharini are secret lovers. When Prabhakaran learns about Dharini's past with Vamsi, he wants to help Dharini and kills Vamsi without Dharini's knowledge. However, when Dharini is asked about Prabhakaran's story, she claims that she barely knows him, which leads the investigators to believe that Prabhakaran is seriously deluded. To further cement the fact that Prabhakaran is the sole murderer and Dharini and Lakshmi are innocent, a listening device is found in Prabhakaran's house to prove that it is through this he came to know about Vamsi. The tale takes its turn in the final minutes, and all of the police officers but Karthikeyan believe that the case can be closed as the murderer Prabhakaran has surrendered. Karthikeyan can not believe that Prabhakaran, a police officer who is known for solving murder cases, could make amateur mistakes when disposing of Vamsi's body.

Karthikeyan ponders his suspicions that the murderers of Vamsi were indeed Dharini and Lakshmi, and thus further investigates Prabhakaran's motive to surrender instead of them. It is found that Prabhakaran lived happily with his wife, Aaradhanaa, who bore a resemblance to Dharini. Unfortunately, she was murdered by Ali, an escaped criminal, who considers himself to be Prabhakaran's enemy (as shown in the opening scene). Prabhakaran resigns from his job as a police officer and starts to search for Ali, who escaped after murdering his wife. When he learns that the murderer is in Chennai, he moves there to avenge Aaraadhanaa's death. When Dharini and Lakshmi killed Vamsi in self-defence, Prabhakaran, wanting to help Dharini as she resembles his deceased wife, plots and kills his wife's murderer the next day and conceals his body instead of Vamsi to misdirect the case investigators from suspecting Dharini and Lakshmi. Karthikeyan gains a newfound respect for Prabhakaran after learning the truth, which he decides to keep a secret.

== Cast ==
- Vijay Antony as Prabhakaran, a former Hyderabad Cadre IPS.
- Arjun as DCP Karthikeyan, IPS officer who investigates the case.
- Ashima Narwal in a dual role as
  - Dharini, the main victim of the film who kills Vamsi in Self defense.
  - Aaradhana, Prabhakaran's wife killed by Ali, a wanted criminal avenges on Prabhakaran.
- Seetha as Lakshmi, Dharini's mother
- Nassar as Retired Police Officer
- Bagavathi Perumal as Murali
- K. S. G. Venkatesh as Forensic Medical Examiner
- Gowtham as Vamsi, abuser of Dharini
- Sampath Ram as Ali, abuser of Aaradhana
- Danya Pallath
- Cinemawala Sathish as Jegan

== Production ==
The first look poster of the film featuring Vijay Antony and Arjun was unveiled on 5 June 2018. The shooting of the film went on floors on the same day following a ceremonial pooja. The film is directed by Andrew Louis as his second assignment, who is also a friend of Vijay Antony and eventually returned to his directorial venture after a decade who also shot to prominence for his 2012 directorial venture Leelai. Vijay Antony was signed to play the lead role while he was busy shooting for Thimiru Pudichavan.

The filmmakers roped in Arjun opposite Vijay Antony to play an important role in the film while he was committed for Irumbu Thirai (2018). Indian-Australian model Ashima Narwal was also approached to play the female lead role in the film, with the latter making her Tamil film debut. The role of Ashima is speculated to be an innocent character named Dharini from Hyderabad. However, the filmmakers refused to reveal the exact roles of Vijay Antony and Arjun. The filmmakers have revealed that about half of the portions of the shooting segment was completed and as of 29 December 2018 it was also reported that Arjun has wrapped his shoot portions of the film. The shooting of the film was entirely in Chennai.

The film was marketed and distributed by G. Dhananjayan of BOFTA Media Works Pvt Ltd.

== Soundtrack ==
The soundtrack was composed by Simon K. King. This film marks Vijay Antony's second film to have a different music director after India Pakistan (2015).

Kolaigaran

Soundtrack album by Simon K. King
- Released: 2019
- Length: 18:42
- Language: Tamil
- Labels: Vijay Antony Music; Divo
- Producer: Simon K. King

Simon K. King chronology
Sathya (2017)	Kolaigaran (2019)	Market Raja MBBS (2019)

Tracklist (Tamil version)
No.	Title	Singers	Length
1.	"Theme of Kolaigaran"	Shilvi Sharon	2:29
2.	"Kollathey Kollathey"	Yazin Nizar	4:01
3.	"Idhamaai Idhamaai"	Karthik, Keerthana Vaidyanathan	4:12
4.	"Andavane Thunai"	Sivam	3:24
5.	"Idhamaai Unplugged"	Janani S. V., Kapil	4:36
Total length:			18:42

== Release ==
The film released theatrically on 7 June 2019.

== Reception ==
The film received overall positive reviews.

M Suganth critic of The Times of India gave 3.5 stars out of 5 and wrote that "The initial portions set up the mystery quite nicely and makes us unsure of the motivations of the main characters.". A critic from The Hindu wrote that "A well-executed whodunit that would have been even better had it had more zing"

S Subhakeerthana critic of The Indian Express gave 3 out of 5 ratings and stated that " A well-made investigative thriller with solid twists and turns". A critic of Hindustan Times wrote that "One of the primary reasons why Kolaigaran works majorly is because it gives audiences the chance to step into the shoes of its lead characters. " and gave 3 out of 5 rating.

Sudhir Srinivasan critic of Cinema Express gave 2.5 out of 5 and wrote that 'Ultimately, I liked the seeming sincerity with which the film looks to have been made, even if you walk out fairly underwhelmed". Sreedhar Pillai critic of Firstpost stated that "The makers of the film claim that the songs are a commercial necessity to provide some relief from the tension." and gave 3.25 out of 5 rating.The Asian Age critic gave mixed reviews.
