= G. Dhananjayan =

Indian film producer

Govind Dhananjayan
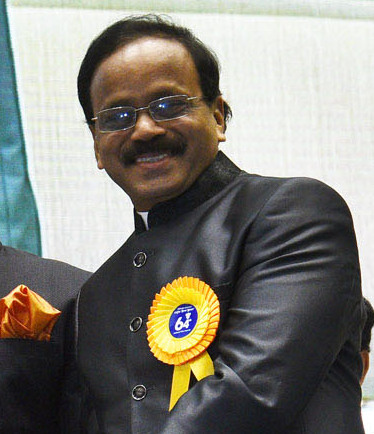
- Dhananjayan in 2017
- Born: 14 May 1965 (age 61); Senjiagaram Chennai, Tamil Nadu, India
- Occupations: Management Professional, Director – BOFTA Film Institute
- Years active: 2006–present
- Spouse: Lalitha Dhananjayan
- Children: 2

G. Dhananjayan (GD) is an Indian film producer, distributor, columnist, author of four books on Indian films, and founder-director of BOFTA Film Institute. He has produced films in the Tamil, Telugu, Malayalam and Hindi languages, including Sankat City (2009), Kanden Kadhalai (2009), Mugamoodi (2012), Anjaan (2014) and Irudhi Suttru (2016), Kaatrin Mozhi (2018), Kabadadaari (2021), and Kodiyil Oruvan (2021). He has won two National Film Awards.

== Education and work ==
G. Dhananjayan holds an MBA degree from Sydenham Institute of Management SIMSREE, University of Mumbai (1991 batch), and earned his Ph.D. from Mumbai University for his thesis on the Indian Film Industry in March 2019.

He worked in Asian Paints Ltd, Kansai Nerolac Paints, Saregama, Bharti Airtel, and Vodafone for more than 15 years before joining Moser Baer Entertainment in 2006. Dhananjayan was the company's Chief Operating Officer of Home Video Business and then chief executive officer of the Film Business.

Dhananjayan was one of the two founding members of Moser Baer Entertainment in April 2006. Within 6 months, GD acquired the copyright/marketing rights for over 10,000 film titles in ten languages, including Hindi, Tamil, Telugu, Kannada, Malayalam, Bengali, Marathi, Gujarati, Punjabi to launch DVDs and VCDs under the banner of Moser Baer. This allowed to compete with low-priced unauthorized copies of DVDs.

Dhananjayan was associated with UTV Motion Pictures (now part of Disney-India) from January 2011 till February 2016 and was instrumental in producing several films in the South.

Dhananjayan did lectures and interactions with students of various film institutes across India. He also delivered speeches at IIT, NIT, and other management institutes on film business. Dhananjayan has spoken at various forums and programs on the film business, management, and other topics.

Dhananjayan was the founding Director of BOFTA Film Institute, a pioneer in Film Education in Tamil Nadu where the students learn from the Masters.

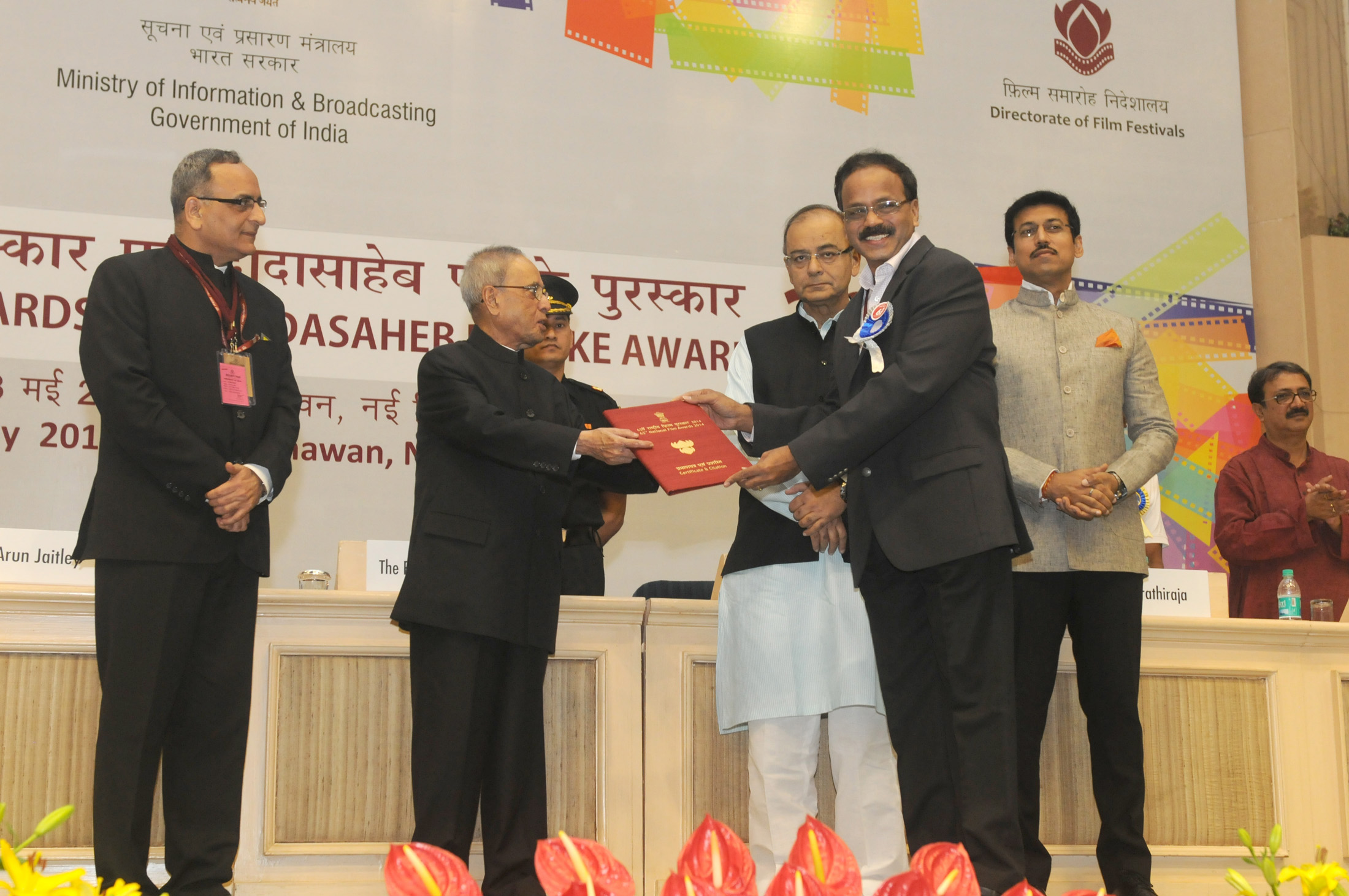
Shri Pranab Mukherjee presenting the Special Mention Certificate for “Pride of Tamil Cinema” (1931–2013)to Shri G. Dhananjayan, at the 62nd National Film Awards Function

Dhananjayan has also made documentaries on legendary filmmakers. His first documentary on Producer-Director-Writer Panchu Arunachalam titled 'A Creator with Midas Touch' which was selected and screened at Indian Panorama of International Film Festival in Goa (2016). His second documentary on legendary director Krishnan–Panju was selected and screened at Mumbai International Film Festival (2017) and received critical acclaim.

Dhananjayan joined hands with lyricist and screenplay writer Madhan Karky in 2023 and started a pioneering initiative of SCRIPTick, a ready-to-shoot script bank to help talented screenwriters.

=== Film production ===
At Moser Baer Entertainment Dhananjayan ventured into film production with Shaurya in Hindi and Vellitherai in Tamil. Moser Baer then produced Sankat City and "Hide & Seek" in Hindi, Raman Thediya Seethai, Poo, Abhiyum Naanum,Kanden Kadhalai, Aval Peyar Thamizharasi, and Siddhu +2 with K. Bhagyaraj in Tamil and Kaana Kanmani in Malayalam in two years.

At UTV Motion Pictures (now called Disney-India) Dhananjayan had acquired and also produced films in Tamil and Malayalam. The first film, UTV marketed after his joining was Deiva Thirumagal which was a critically acclaimed movie. He was involved in producing, marketing, and distributing films. Under his supervision UTV co-produced in Tamil Vettai and Vazhakku Enn 18/9 with Director N. Lingusamy's Thirrupathi Brothers, Kalakalappu and Theeya Velai Seiyyanum Kumaru with Sundar C's Avni Cinemax, M.Saravanan—Vikram Prabhu' Ivan Veramathiri and Suriya's Anjaan with Director N. Lingusamy's Thirrupathi Brothers, and Naan Sigappu Manithan with Vishal Film Factory. GD had produced under UTV banner Muran, Mugamoodi, Thaandavam,"Settai, Sigaram Thodu, Director S.P.Jhananathan—Arya-Vijay Sethupathi's Purampokku and Director Vishnuvaradhan—Arya's Yatchan in Tamil. In Malayalam UTV had produced Grandmaster and Husbands in Goa. In his last assignment with UTV, Dhananjayan was involved in the marketing of Director Sudha Kongara and Madhavan's Irudhi Suttru in 2016.

Dhananjayan is currently an independent consulting film producer and distributor. In 2018, he produced Tamil films Mr. Chandramouli by Thiru (director), starring Karthik (actor), Gautham Karthik, Regina Cassandra, Varalaxmi Sarathkumar, Santhosh Prathap and others and Kaatrin Mozhi by Radha Mohan, starring Jyothika, Vidharth, Lakshmi Manchu, Kabadadaari with Sibi Sathyaraj and Kapatadhaari in Telugu with Sumanth.

Dhananjayan is one of the partners of Infiniti Film Ventures and the company has produced Kodiyil Oruvan, Kolai, and Raththam released in 2023.

=== Movie distribution ===
Dhananjayan distributed the film Zero in 2016 under his production banner Blue Ocean Entertainment. In May 2017, he commenced his distribution company Creative Entertainers and Distributors and distributed the successful film Ivan Thanthiran. In 2018 GD distributed the film U Turn starring Samantha Prabhu in Tamil Nadu, which became a success.

Dhananjayan's recently distributed film is Kolaigaran which was released on June 7, 2019, and "Kavalthurai Ungal Nanban, which got released in 2020. Both films were commercial successes.

=== Writing career ===
Dhananjayan has contributed several articles to the Times of India, The Hindu Tamil, Dinathanthi Next, Deccan Chronicle, Indian Management, DNA, India Today, and other publications.

Dhananjayan has written a book about Tamil cinema titled The Best of Tamil Cinema: 1931 to 2010, in English, which was released by Legendary Actor Kamal Haasan on 2 March 2011 in the presence of eminent film makers. Super Star Rajinikanth personally appreciated the book by giving a memento for the fantastic research and writing on Tamil cinema.

Dhananjayan's second book was "Pride of Tamil Cinema", released in 2014. The book was released at Indian Panorama, Goa in 2014.

Dhananjayan's fourth book titled 'The Art and Business of Cinema(ABC)' was released in December 2017 comprising nearly 100 articles that explains the various art and business facets of cinema.

Dhananjayan's series of articles in various newspapers won him his second National Award as the Best Critic of the Year 2016.

Dhananjayan was also the compiling author of two books by legendary actor, painter, orator and philanthropist Sivakumar titled ‘Paintings of Sivakumar’ and ‘Golden Moments of Sivakumar’.

In 2021, served for a brief period as the Head of Tamil content and digital business in SonyLIV. In 2023, Dhananjayan and Madhan Karky started SCRIPTICK, a "script bank" to help aspiring screenwriters better research their scripts.

== Filmography ==
As the Producer or Co-Producer at Moser Baer Entertainment

- Vellithirai (2008)
- Raman Thediya Seethai (2008)
- Poo (2008)
- Abhiyum Naanum (2008)
- Sankat City (2009) - Hindi
- Kana Kanmani (2009) – Malayalam
- Kanden Kadhalai (2009)
- Aval Peyar Thamizharasi (2010)
- Siddhu +2 (2010)
- Hide & Seek (2010) – Hindi
- Mayilu (2012)

As Associate Producer at Disney-UTV Motion Pictures

- Deivathirumagal (2011)
- Muran (2011)
- Vettai (2012)
- Kalakalappu (2012)
- Vazhakku Enn 18/9 (2012)
- Grandmaster (2012) – Malayalam
- Husbands in Goa (2012) – Malayalam
- Mugamoodi (2012)
- Thaandavam (2012)
- Settai (2013)
- Theeya Velai Seiyyanum Kumaru (2013)
- Ivan Veramathiri (2013)
- Naan Sigappu Manithan (2014)
- Anjaan (2014)
- Sigaram Thodu (2014)
- Purampokku (2014)
- Yatchan (2015)
- Irudhi Suttru (2016)

As Producer – Creative Entertainers

- Mr. Chandramouli (2018)
- Kaatrin Mozhi (2018)
- Kabadadaari (2021)
- Kapatadhaari (2021)
- Love Oh Love (2026)

As Partner Producer – Infiniti Film Ventures

- Kodiyil Oruvan (2021)
- Kolai (film) (2023)
- Raththam (2023)

As Co-Producer

- Vanamagan (2017)

As Theatrical Distributor

- Zero (2016)
- Ivan Thanthiran (2017)
- U Turn (2018)
- Kolaigaran (2019)
- Asuran (2019)
- Kavalthurai Ungal Nanban (2020)

As Digital Distributor

- Irudhi Pakkam (2021)
- Kayamai Kadakka (2021)
- Parole (2022)
- Erumbu (2023)

As the Co-Producer at Studio Green

- Teddy (2021)
- Kaatteri (2022)
- Theal (2022)
- Pathu Thala (2023)
- 80s Buildup (2023)
- Rebel (2024)
- Vaa Vaathiyaare (2024)
- Thangalaan (2024)
- Kanguva (2024)

Documentary films

- A Creator with Midas Touch (documentary on Panchu Arunachalam)
- The Pioneering Duo (documentary on Krishnan–Panju)

As Actor

- Mandhira Punnagai (2010)
- Vandhaan Vendraan (2011)
- Kathai Thiraikathai Vasanam Iyakkam (2014)
- Idhu Namma Aalu (2016)
- Utharavu Maharaja (2018)
- Boomerang (2019)
- Kabadadaari (2021)

== Books ==
- Best of Tamil Cinema: 1931 to 2010 (2 Volumes)
- Pride of Tamil Cinema: 1931–2013
- Vellithirayin Vetri Manthirangal (in Tamil)
- The Art and Business of Cinema (ABC)

== Awards ==
- 2015: National Film Award for Best Book on Cinema (Special Mention) – Pride of Tamil Cinema (1931–2013)
- 2017: National Film Award for Best Film Critic
