= Rajabheema =

- Theatrical release poster
- Directed by: Naresh Sampath
- Written by: Karundhel Rajesh
- Produced by: S. Mohan
- Starring: Arav; Ashima Narwal
- Cinematography: S. R. Sathish Kumar
- Edited by: Gopi Krishna
- Music by: Simon K. King
- Production company: Surabi Films
- Release date: 31 January 2025
- Running time: 118 minutes
- Country: India
- Language: Tamil

Rajabheema (or Raja Bheema) is a 2025 Indian Tamil language action thriller film directed by Naresh Sampath on his directorial debut with dialogues written by Karundhel Rajesh. The storyline of the film is based on the connection between a man and elephant. The film stars Arav and Ashima Narwal in the lead roles. The music for the film is composed by Simon K. King with lyrics penned by Madhan Karky. The film is produced by S. Mohan under the production banner Surbhi Films.

The film was released on 31 January 2025 after having been delayed for over 8 years.

== Cast ==
- Arav as Raja
  - Master Raghavan as Young Raja
- Ashima Narwal as Thulasi
- Oviya (cameo appearance)
- Yashika Aannand
- Nassar as Raja's father
- K. S. Ravikumar as Minister Mandranayagam
- Yogi Babu as Minister Mandranayagam's son
- Sayaji Shinde
- Prabhakar
- TSR Srinivasan
- Jayakumar as Mandranayagam's assistant
- Madhankumar Dhakshinamoorthy
- Karate Venkatesh
- Ravi Venkatraman
- Jaya Swaminathan
- Thangamani Prabhu

== Production ==
The film was announced by Naresh Sampath on his directorial debut in early 2018 and revealed that Arav would play the lead role for the first time in his career after taking part in Bigg Boss Tamil 1 (2017). It was also reported that Arav made his film debut as playback singer through this film as he voiced for one song. Ashima Narwal was approached to play the female lead in the film while she was poised to make her Tamil film debut Kolaigaran (2019).

The first schedule of the shooting procedure commenced and progressed in Pallakad. The second schedule of the film went on floors in around December 2018 in Pollachi and the final schedule of the film took place in Coimbatore during January 2019. Oviya, who is known for her speculations as Arav's girlfriend, also appeared in a cameo appearance and is set to feature in an item song. The shooting of the Luthu song featuring Oviya took place in around January 2019.

== Music ==
The music was composed by Simon.K.King.

Track listing
No.	Title	Singer(s)	Length
1.	"Beeman"	Simon.K.King, Anthony dasan, Keerthana	03:22
2.	"Ganesaa"	Simon.K.King, Chinnaponnu,Gowri Lakshmi	03:13
3.	"Raani varra"	Simon.K.King,G.Vignesh	04:31
4.	"Thooya"	Simon.K.King, Karthik, Keerthana	04:26

== Release ==
Rajabheema was released in theatres on 31 January 2025.

== Reception ==
=== Critical Response ===
Abhinav Subramanian of The Times of India wrote rated the film two-and-a-half out of five stars and wrote, "Rajabheema stands as a sincere but routine wildlife drama. It successfully stokes empathy for its pachyderm players, keeping its feet firmly on the ground rather than attempting to soar". A writer from News Today wrote, "The movie stays grounded in its primary theme, offering a coherent and engaging narrative from start to finish".
