= Kapatadhaari =

2021 film directed by Pradeep Krishnamoorthy

- Directed by: Pradeep Krishnamoorthy
- Screenplay by: Hemanth M. Rao
- Story by: Hemanth M. Rao
- Produced by: G. Dhananjayan; Lalitha Dhananjayan
- Starring: Sumanth; Nandita Swetha
- Cinematography: Rasamathi
- Edited by: Praveen K. L.
- Music by: Simon K King
- Production companies: Creative Entertainers and Distributors
- Release date: 19 February 2021
- Country: India
- Language: Telugu

Kapatadhaari (transl. The one who has multiple faces) is a 2021 Indian Telugu-language neo-noir thriller film directed by Pradeep Krishnamoorthy, and produced by G. Dhananjayan. A remake of the 2019 Kannada film Kavaludaari, it stars Sumanth and Nandhita, with Nassar and Jayaprakash in supporting roles. Filmed simultaneously in Telugu and Tamil, the latter was titled as Kabadadaari, with Sibi Sathyaraj replacing Sumanth. The music is composed by Simon K.King. It was released on 19 February 2021.

== Plot ==
Gowtham is traffic police officer who seeks a more respectable job in the police force. One day, in a nearby construction site, a child finds some bones. This prompts an investigation and Gowtham's interest into the case. He discovers that the case was initially discovered by ex-cop Ranjith Kumar in the earlier years.

== Cast ==
- Sumanth as Gowtham Kumar
- Nandita Swetha as Swathi
- Sampath Maitreya as Fernandez / Aleru Srinivas Rao
- Nassar as Ex cop Ranjith Kumar
- Jayaprakash as Journalist Kumar / Rayudu
- Suman Ranganathan as Ramya
- Vennela Kishore as Gowtham's colleague at traffic duty
- J. Satish Kumar as Ranga Rao
- Sai Dheena as Mechanic
- Kotesh Manava as Gurumurthy

== Production ==
Producer G. Dhananjayan acquired the remake rights of Kavaludaari in early April 2019, for both its Telugu and Tamil versions. Sumanth was selected to play the lead role. Principal photography began on 1 November 2019. Director Pradeep Krishnamoorthy makes his acting debut in this film. Kapatadaari motion poster was released by Nagarjuna on 18 November 2019. The film's post-production began in February 2020. Sumanth completed his dubbing in March 2020.

== Soundtrack ==
Kapatadhaari

Soundtrack album by Simon K King
- Released: 8 February 2021 (Jukebox)
- Recorded: 2020–2021
- Genre: Feature film soundtrack
- Length: 15:07
- Language: Telugu
- Label: Aditya Music
- Producer: Simon K King

Simon K King chronology
Kabadadaari (2021)	Kapatadhaari (2021)	WWW (2021)
External audio
- Audio Jukebox on YouTube

All music is composed by Simon K King.

Telugu (OST)
No.	Title	Lyrics	Singer(s)	Length
1.	"Kapatadhaari"	Bhashyashree	Niranj Suresh
2.	"Kalalo Kanupaape"	Vanamali	Pradeep Kumar
3.	"Hayaki Baby"	Vanamali	Sanah Moidutty
4.	"Theme of Kapatadhaari"	Simon K. King	Simon K. King
5.	"Sabadame"
Total length:				15:07

== Release ==
It was initially scheduled to be released in May 2020, but was postponed due to the COVID-19 pandemic. After the reopening of theatres across Andhra Pradesh, with restrictions of 50% occupancy, Kapatadhaari was scheduled for a theatrical release on 25 December 2020, simultaneously along with its Tamil version, but was postponed due to various reasons. Release date was revised as 26 February 2021 and later advances to 19 February 2021. The film later began streaming from 30 March on Amazon Prime Video.

== Reception ==
Thadhagath Pathi, writing for Times of India gave three stars out of five and termed it as "An engaging thriller that unfolds well." Pathi liked the portrayal of protagonist Gautham as a regular policeman trying to solve a crime instead of a superhero. He praised Sumanth and Nasser for their performance, and Simon King for the music. Pathi concluded, that the film had no unnecessary elements and the director Pradeep Krishnamoorthy kept the flow smooth making it into a worth watch film." Y. Sunita Chowdhary of The Hindu called it a ""well-made thriller" and "faithful remake" while writing "The film does keep you engaged, retains the suspense for most part but lacks any emotional connect."

Sakshi critic Anji Shetty, who rated the film 2.5 out of 5, also appreciated the execution and performances but felt that screenplay and climax could have been better. A reviewer from Eenadu gave a mixed review, stating, "Though there are many thrilling elements in the story, only a few were translated well."
