= Oka Padhakam Prakaram =

2025 Indian Telugu-language film by Vinod Vijayan

- Theatrical release poster
- Directed by: Vinod Vijayan
- Written by: Vinod Vijayan
- Produced by: Vinod Vijayan; Garlapati Ramesh
- Starring: Sairam Shankar; P. Samuthirakani; Ashima Narwal
- Cinematography: Rajeev Ravi; Pappu; Vinod Illampally; Suresh Rajan
- Edited by: Karthik Jogesh
- Music by: Songs: Rahul Raj; Score: Gopi Sundar
- Production companies: Vinod Vijayan Films; Vihari Cinema House
- Release date: 7 February 2025
- Country: India
- Language: Telugu

Oka Padhakam Prakaram (alternatively known as Oka Pathakam Prakaram) is a 2025 Indian Telugu-language legal thriller film written and directed by Vinod Vijayan. The film features Sairam Shankar, P. Samuthirakani and Ashima Narwal in important roles.

The film was released on 7 February 2025.

== Plot ==
Siddharth is an advocate framed for the murder of his spouse, who becomes addicted to recreational drugs. Afterwards, he is also framed for the murder of his close aide, Divya, too. Being a lawyer, he fights his own case and establishes his innocence. However, another lawyer's wife is murdered, and Siddharth is framed for the crime again. How he resolves them, forms the crux of the story.

== Cast ==
- Sairam Shankar as Siddharth Neelakanta
- P. Samuthirakani as Raghuram
- Ashima Narwal as Sita
- Shruti Sodhi as Kavitha
- Kalpa Latha
- Sudhakar as Siddharth's father-in-law
- Bhanu Sri as Divya
- Pallavi Gowda

== Music ==
All music is composed by Rahul Raj.

No.	Title	Lyrics	Singer(s)	Length
1.	"Osaarilaa Raa"	Rehman	Sid Sriram	4:05
2.	"Kanulalo"	Rehman	Sid Sriram	3:30

== Release and reception ==
Oka Padhakam Prakaram was released on 7 February 2025.

Suhas Sistu of The Hans India gave a rating of 2.75 out of 5 stated that, "Despite its minor flaws, Oka Pathakam Prakaram manages to keep crime thriller enthusiasts engaged with its gripping moments and decent performances". Avad Mohammad of OTTPlay rated it 2.5 out of 5 and wrote, "Oka Pathakam Prakaram has a decent few thrills that impress. If you can overlook a few logical errors, the film ends as a passable watch for crime thriller enthusiasts".
