= Paper Rocket =

Indian drama streaming web series

- Promotional poster
- Genre: Drama comedy Romance; Adventure
- Written by: Kiruthiga Udhayanidhi
- Directed by: Kiruthiga Udhayanidhi
- Starring: Kalidas Jayaram; Tanya Ravichandran; Renuka; Karunakaran; Nirmal Palazhi; Gouri G. Kishan; Dheeraj; Nagineedu; Chinni Jayanth; Kaali Venkat; Poornima Bhagyaraj
- Composers: Score: Simon K King; Songs: Simon K King; Vedshanker; Dharan kumar
- Country of origin: India
- Original language: Tamil
- No. of seasons: 1
- No. of episodes: 7

Production
- Producer: Sreenidhi Sagar
- Production location: India
- Cinematography: Richard M. Nathan
- Editor: Lawrence Kishore
- Running time: 220 minutes
- Production company: Rise East Productions

Original release
- Network: ZEE5
- Release: 29 July 2022

Paper Rocket is an Indian drama streaming television web series written and directed by Kiruthiga Udhayanidhi and produced by Sreenidhi Sagar under his banner Rise East Productions. The series stars Kalidas Jayaram and Tanya Ravichandran in the lead roles. Music and background score was composed by Simon K King. Cinematography handled by Richard M Nathan, Gavemic U Ary (one episode) and editing was done by Lawrence Kishore.

The series was premiered on the 29 July 2022 exclusively on ZEE5.

== Cast ==
- Kalidas Jayaram as Jeeva
- Tanya Ravichandran as Ilakya
- Renuka as Valliamma
- Karunakaran as Tiger
- Nirmal Palazhi as Unni
- Gouri G. Kishan as Charu
- Dheeraj as Prathyush
- Nagineedu as Gunaselan
- Chinni Jayanth as Devarajan
- Kaali Venkat as Francis
- Poornima Bhagyaraj as Dr. Sheila
- G.M.Kumar as Grandfather
- Abhishek Shankar as Shankar IPS
- Priyadharshini Rajkumar as Kala

== Production ==
On 5 April 2022 the director herself reveals the title and first single.

== Music ==
The soundtrack album and background score for Paper Rocket were composed by Simon K King, and two songs by Vedshanker and two songs by Dharan kumar.

Track listing
No.	Title	Lyrics	Music	Singer(s)	Length
1.	"Cheranaadu"	Ku. Karthik Joe Paul	Simon K King	Ramya Nambeesan	3:45
2.	"Vaana Veetilae"	Ku. Karthik	Simon K King	Sony Daffodil, Sanah Moidutty, Shilvi Sharon	3:29
3.	"Jo Jo Jo"	Mani Amuthavan	Vedshanker	Haricharan Seshadri	3:37
4.	"Kandaen Kandaen"	Ku. Karthik	Dharan kumar	Srisha Mohandas	4:18
5.	"Oraayiram Jenmam"	Ku. Karthik	Simon K King	Keshav Ram	3:22
6.	"Oru Kanni"	Mani Amuthavan	Vedshanker	Sreekanth Hariharan	3:35
7.	"Kaalai Maalai"	Vivek	Dharan kumar	Sid Sriram	4:37
8.	"Iruvizhi"	Ku. Karthik	Simon K King	Alexandra Joy	3:17
Total length:					30:10

== Episodes ==
No.	Title	Directed by	Written by	Original release date
1	"An Incomplete Story"	Kiruthiga Udhayanidhi	Kiruthiga Udhayanidhi	29 July 2022
2	"Circle of Trust"	Kiruthiga Udhayanidhi	Kiruthiga Udhayanidhi	29 July 2022
3	"Be Like a River"	Kiruthiga Udhayanidhi	Kiruthiga Udhayanidhi	29 July 2022
4	"Homecoming"	Kiruthiga Udhayanidhi	Kiruthiga Udhayanidhi	29 July 2022
5	"Love in the Time of Tumor"	Kiruthiga Udhayanidhi	Kiruthiga Udhayanidhi	29 July 2022
6	"Sufferning Breath"	Kiruthiga Udhayanidhi	Kiruthiga Udhayanidhi	29 July 2022
7	"Celebrating Death"	Kiruthiga Udhayanidhi	Kiruthiga Udhayanidhi	29 July 2022

== Release ==
The series is all set to be released on ZEE5 on 29 July 2022.
