= Simon K. King =

Indian film composer

Simon K King
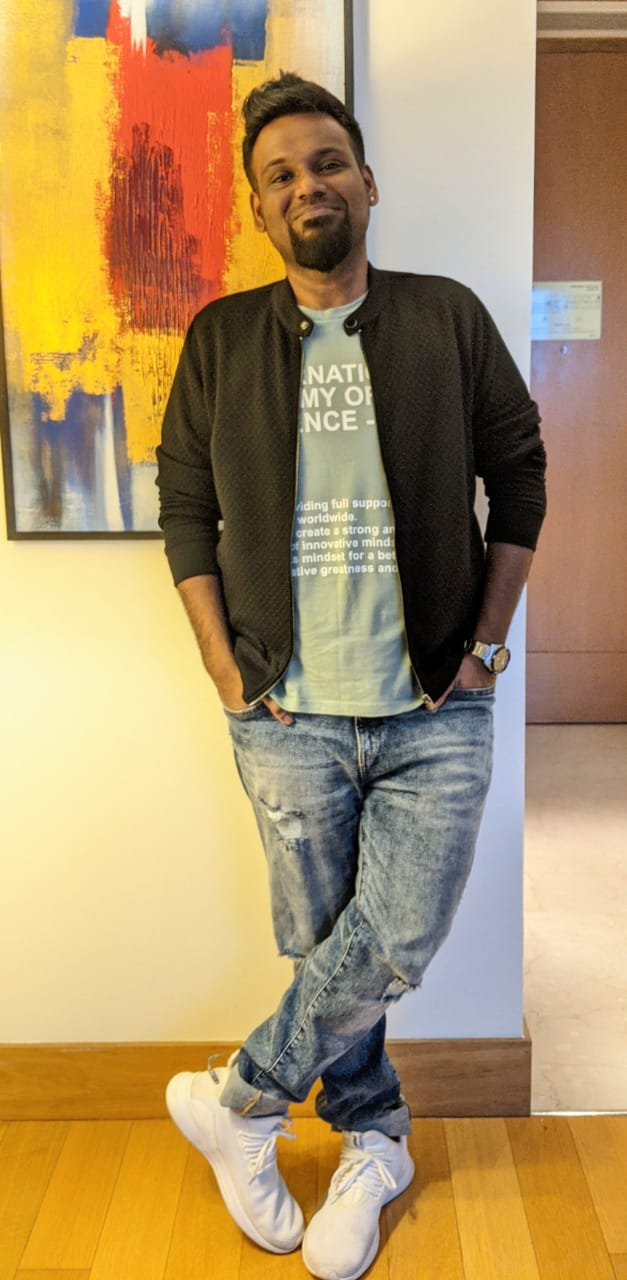

Background information
- Also known as: Simon K. King, Simon
- Born: Chennai, Tamil Nadu, India
- Genres: Film score, jazz, blues
- Occupations: Composer, performer, record producer, music director, arranger, singer, song writer
- Instruments: Synthesizer, piano, keyboard, guitar
- Years active: 2013–present

Simon K. King is an Indian film composer who predominantly works in Tamil and other South Indian language films. He made his debut with Sasi's Ainthu Ainthu Ainthu (2013). He is best known for composing the song "Yavvana" for the film Sathya (2017) and for his background score in Kolaigaran (2019).

In addition to feature films, he is recognized as one of the major composers in the South Indian web series landscape, having scored multiple early high-profile digital projects. His notable OTT projects include Paper Rocket (ZEE5), the thriller series Vadhandhi: The Fable of Velonie (Amazon Prime Video), Thalaimai Seyalagam (ZEE5), Goli Soda Rising (Disney+ Hotstar), and The Game: You Never Play Alone (Netflix).

== Career ==
Simon K. King began his musical journey as a keyboard programmer while completing his undergraduate degree in electrical engineering. He subsequently shifted his focus to composing and arranging music, working as a freelance music producer for various music directors across the Tamil, Hindi, Telugu, Kannada, and Malayalam film industries. He also gained industry experience working in radio broadcasting during the early 2000s, serving as a Radio Jockey (RJ).

King made his official debut as a film composer with director Sasi's action thriller Ainthu Ainthu Ainthu (2013). The soundtrack notably featured the track "Ezhavu," which incorporated traditional oppari (folk mourning music) into a hip-hop template. He achieved widespread recognition with the romantic single "Yavvana" from the mystery film Sathya (2017) and received critical acclaim for his atmospheric, suspense-driven background score in the thriller Kolaigaran (2019).

Alongside his work in feature films, the 2020s have seen King actively expand into digital streaming platforms, composing the music and background scores for prominent web series. His projects in the OTT landscape include ZEE5's Paper Rocket (2022) and Thalaimai Seyalagam (2024), Disney+ Hotstar's Goli Soda Rising (2024), Amazon Prime Video's mystery thriller Vadhandhi: The Fable of Velonie (2022), and Netflix's The Game: You Never Play Alone (2025).

== Films ==
Year	Film title	Language	Notes
2013	Ainthu Ainthu Ainthu	Tamil	
2015	Aindhaam Thalaimurai Sidha Vaidhiya Sigamani	Tamil	
2017	Sathya	Tamil	
2019	Kolaigaran	Tamil	
2019	Market Raja MBBS	Tamil	
2020	Asuraguru	Tamil	Background Score only
2021	Kabadadaari	Tamil	
2021	Kapatadhaari	Telugu	
2021	WWW	Telugu	
2022	Highway	Telugu	
2024	Anveshi	Telugu	Background Score only
2024	Chaari 111	Telugu	
2025	Rajabheema	Tamil	
2026	Made in Korea	Tamil	One Song only

== Web series ==
Year	Title	Language	Platform
2022	Paper Rocket	Tamil	ZEE5
2022	Vadhandhi: The Fable of Velonie	Tamil	Amazon Prime Video
2024	Goli Soda Rising	Tamil	Disney+ Hotstar
2024	Thalaimai Seyalagam	Tamil	ZEE5
2025	The Game: You Never Play Alone	Tamil	Netflix
2026	Vadhandhi (Season 2)	Tamil	Amazon Prime Video
