= Sri Lankan hip-hop =

Music genre in Sri Lanka

Sri Lankan Hip Hop
- Stylistic origins: Hip hop; Gangsta rap; Reggae; funk; R&B; soul; rap rock; Desi hip hop
- Cultural origins: Mid 1990s
- Typical instruments: vocals/rapping; sampler; synthesizer; bass; drum machine

Sri Lankan Hip Hop is a part of the Asian hip hop culture. This multilingual genre features Sinhala, Tamil and English.

== History ==
The first hip hop artists in Sri Lanka to gain popular recognition were Brown Boogie Nation (a G-funk-style group, composed of Subodha Pilimatalawwe, Nishan Dias Weerasinghe and Randhir Witana) and Rude Boy Republic (a Rude boy-style group, composed of Asif Ansar, Shiraz and Rukshan Dole) Backing beats and production by Mel "Herbie" Kent (Juliana's). Both of these groups featured in the 1997 compilation album, Colombo Tribe Project Vol. 1 (Blood Brother Records), which was the first time a recording of Sri Lankan hip hop had been released. Brown Boogie Nation's song, "You Get Around" was the first original Sri Lankan hip hop song to receive radio airplay in the country (broadcast on local English radio station TNL Radio), and their politically-conscious anti-war song, "Lions and Tigers", was the first Sri Lankan hip hop music video aired on national television.

The year 1998 saw the release of "'Gangsta Raps" and "Smooth Flow" by Urban Sound (composed of Krishan Maheson and his brother Gajan), which received airplay on local English radio station Sun FM. Their next single, "Stop the Virus", won an award for the 'Best TV campaign on HIV Awareness' from the Asian Institute of Broadcasting Development.

The beginning of Tamil rap by Krishan Maheson was 2004's "J Town Story", while the country's first Sinhala rap track was released in 2005 in the form of Iraj's eponymous album. Krishan Maheson's Asian Avenue was the first Sri Lankan album to be released by Universal Music India in 2006. Sri Lankan-American DeLon's single “Nasty Girl” debuted at number 36 on the Billboard Charts. Ranidu Lankage's first single with Ashanthi, "Oba Magemai", led to the duo becoming the youngest Sri Lankan artists to be signed by an international record label, Sony Music India. Lankage's “Kelle” was featured on the BBC Asian Chart and received worldwide airplay.

Bathiya and Santhush and Randhir collaborated on the first hip hop remix song "Siri Sangabodhi". The DeLon remix of M.I.A.'s "Paper Planes" was another notable milestone. The selfie rap phenomenon of 2015 is thought to have helped promote and popularise hip hop among a wider audience, after a lull spanning several years in the lead-up.

Since 2015, Hustler Bhai aka Hamdaan Hassan has been producing gangsta rap as a rapper, music director, and video director in both Tamil and Sinhala languages. In 2020, he released a tribute song for the Indian movie KGF, titled Monster. In 2025, he released the first gangsta short film titled Mafia.

Sri Lankan hip hop has grown from a niche status to a mainstay in the local music industry in less than two decades, with a few of them even going international.

“Kuddah”, released by Smokio in January 2026, surpassed one million views within 24 hours. The music video was edited and color graded by Wagmee.
