= Costa (rapper) =

Sri Lankan rapper and music producer

- Also known as: Costa Maarley
- Born: Prathap Costa
- Origin: Kandy, Sri Lanka
- Education: Trinity College, Kandy
- Genres: Sinhala hip hop; Hip hop; Rap
- Occupations: Rapper; Singer; Record producer; Beatmaker
- Years active: 2010s–present
Costa
YouTube information
- Channel: Costa
- Years active: 2011 - present
- Subscribers: 680k
- Views: 176 million
- Last updated: November 13, 2026

Prathap Costa (Sinhala: ප්‍රතාප් කොස්තා), also known as Costa and Costa Maarley, is a Sri Lankan rapper, singer and music producer. Originally from Kandy, he is associated with the Sinhala and English hip-hop scene in Sri Lanka. He is known for his experimental musical style, self-produced beats and collaborations with other Sri Lankan hip-hop artists, including Smokio.

== Career ==
=== Early career ===
Costa was born and raised in Sri Lanka and spent approximately 20 years of his life in Kandy before moving to Colombo for employment. He later relocated to Finland.

During his school years, he was a member of the S1 Crew, a Sinhala alternative music group from Kandy. The group produced songs including "Loweth Na" and "Hotel Yusufia". Costa remained associated with the group until his departure from Sri Lanka.

Although initially involved in alternative music, Costa developed an interest in hip hop and music production. He subsequently began working as a rapper, singer and producer.

=== Solo career ===
In February 2016, Costa released "Paavi Paavi", which was featured by Sri Lankan music publication Decibel. The publication identified him as a Sinhala rapper based in Finland and a member of the S1 Crew from Kandy.

In October 2016, Costa was interviewed by Decibel following the release of "Nuwara Machang (The Town)". In the interview, he discussed his musical influences, his background in Kandy and his approach to music production. He described his work as extending beyond rap to include singing and producing music.

In 2020, Costa released several independent tracks and collaborated with other Sri Lankan artists. His music during this period included "Corona", "Batanala" and "Heena Mathe", a collaboration with Ravi Jay.

=== Musical style ===
Costa's music incorporates elements of Sinhala and English hip hop. His style has been described as combining nostalgic samples, prominent bass-driven production and melodic vocals. His work has been associated with the development of experimental Sinhala hip hop in Sri Lanka.

In his 2016 interview with Decibel, Costa described his lyrical approach as based on free-flowing thoughts and storytelling. He also cited international musicians including Travis Scott, Tyler, the Creator, A$AP Rocky, J. Cole and Kanye West among his influences.

== Discography ==
=== Selected songs ===
Year	Title	Artist credits
2016	"Paavi Paavi"	Costa
2016	"Nuwara Machang (The Town)"	Costa
2020	"Corona"	Ambroz and Costa
2020	"Batanala"	Costa
2020	"Heena Mathe"	Ravi Jay and Costa
2021	"Hanthane"	Costa and Maduwa
2021	"Kaluwara Ahasa"	Costa
2022	"Sonduriya"	Costa, Big Doggy and MasterD
