= The Game: You Never Play Alone =

- Promotional poster
- Created by: Amalga Creations Medias INC.
- Written by: Deepthi Govindarajan
- Directed by: Rajesh M. Selva
- Starring: Shraddha Srinath; Santhosh Prathap; Chandini Tamilarasan; Bala Hasan R; Subash Selvam; Viviya Santh
- Music by: Simon K. King
- Country of origin: India
- Original language: Tamil
- No. of seasons: 1
- No. of episodes: 7

Production
- Executive producers: Vignesh Menon; Prasoon Garg
- Producers: Sameer Nair; Pramod Cheruvalath
- Cinematography: Akilesh Kathamuthu
- Editor: Manimaran
- Production company: Applause Entertainment

Original release
- Network: Netflix
- Release: 2 October 2025

The Game: You Never Play Alone is a Tamil-language thriller television series created by Amalga Creations Medias INC and directed by Rajesh M. Selva. The series was written by Deepthi Govindarajan for Netflix. It stars Shraddha Srinath, Santhosh Prathap and Chandini Tamilarasan. The series was released on 2 October 2025.

== Plot summary ==
A passionate game developer determined to build her career must confront and defy misogynistic pressures when she becomes the victim of vicious online and real-world harassment.

== Cast ==
- Shraddha Srinath as Kavya
- Santhosh Prathap as Anoop
- Chandini Tamilarasan as Bhanumathi
- Subramanian Gopalakrishnan as S.I Pandiyan
- Bala Hasan R
- Subash Selvam
- Viviya Santh
- Mukund K Rajesh as Dani
- Syama Harini as Anne
- Hema as Tara

== Release ==
The series was released on Netflix on October 2, 2025.

== Reception ==
Harshini SV of The Times of India gave 2.5 stars and observed that "Kavya’s games are described (again, never shown) to be the best because of the intricate details in their gaming world, and this detail and depth are what’s missing in the promising yet unconvincing The Game: You Never Play Alone." Nandini Ramnath of Scroll.in stated that "The seven-episode series is a passable thriller, with enough developments to keep all its characters busy, most of all Kavya. The show’s interest in the unseemly aspects of gaming culture or generalised misogyny itself is ultimately shallow, a contrivance to increase Kavya’s workload." Janani K of India Today gave 2.5 stars out of 5 and said that "The Netflix show has promising ideas, but fails to explore them fully."

Shilajit Mitra of The Hollywood Reporter India observed that "The Game nevertheless amuses as a send-up of India's digital economy. "The download is all that matters," says a thin-lipped foreign investor in Kavya's company. Mobile is both present and future (the only character we see gaming on a console is poor Anoop). Misogyny runs rampant when data is cheap, and, as with fake news and political radicalisation, you never play alone." Lachmi Deb Roy of Firstpost rated it 3/5 stars and said that "The Game: You Never Play Alone’ is not just a thriller, but an eye-opener too for both youngsters and parents of teenagers and young adults." Anusha Sundar of OTT Play rated it 2.5/5 stars and commented that "With sharp moments but weak world-building, it’s a middling yet thought-provoking watch."

Rashmi Vasudeva of Deccan Herald gave it 3 stars out of 5 and said that "However, as the series progresses, the glitches show. The mystery becomes predictable, the gaming world remains a glossy backdrop rather than an immersive universe, and the villains arrive straight from cliché land. Subplots fizzle before finding shape." Sumit Rajguru of Times Now rated it 2.5/5 stars and said that "Overall, The Game – You Never Play Alone is an engaging show but marred by a predictable twist. Shraddha Srinath’s performance makes the web show worth watching. It has some flaws, but if you are a fan of crime thrillers, it is a treat for you."
