= Kavaludaari =

- Theatrical poster
- Directed by: Hemanth M Rao
- Written by: Hemanth Rao
- Produced by: Ashwini Puneeth Rajkumar
- Starring: Rishi; Anant Nag; Achyuth Kumar; Suman Ranganathan; Roshni Prakash; Sulile Kumar; Sampath; Sidhaartha Maadhyamika
- Cinematography: Advaitha Gurumurthy
- Edited by: Jagadeesh N.
- Music by: Charan Raj
- Production company: PRK Productions
- Distributed by: Sri Vajreshwari Combines
- Release date: April 12, 2019
- Country: India
- Language: Kannada

Kavaludaari (transl. Crossroads) is a 2019 Indian Kannada-language neo-noir crime thriller film written and directed by Hemanth Rao, presented by Puneeth Rajkumar and produced by Ashwini Puneeth Rajkumar of PRK Productions. Kavaludaari will be the first feature film presentation from the production house. The film stars Rishi, Anant Nag, Achyuth Kumar, Suman Ranganath, and Roshni Prakash in the lead roles, while Avinash, Sulile Kumar, Sampath, and Sidhaartha Maadhyamika play supporting roles. The music and background score for the film is composed by Charan Raj with cinematography by Advaitha Gurumoorthy and editing by Jagadeesh. The film released on 12 April 2019.

Puneeth Rajkumar had revealed that the movie is being remade in Tamil, Telugu, Malayalam and Hindi. The film was remade in Tamil as Kabadadaari starring Sibiraj and in Telugu as Kapatadhaari starring Sumanth; both versions star Nandita Swetha.

== Plot ==
SI K. S. Shyam is a sincere traffic cop, whose real interest lies in handling crime-related cases. One day, he accidentally comes across the skeletal remains of a three-member family, and he decides to pursue his interest despite warning from his senior officer. However, his plans hit a roadblock when he gets to know that the remains are four-decades old. The forensic reports show that there are signs of struggle on the bodies, so it most likely was a murder. His encounter with Kumar, a struggling small-time journalist who is equally interested in the case, helps him unfold many mysteries. He looks through the cold case archives finds out that the dead family's head is Gurudas Naidu, the boss of an archaeology department who worked with Sampath to uncover jewels from the Vijayanagara Empire. Naidu and his family's disappearance was the same day Sampath was mysteriously killed in 1977.

Gurudas Naidu was seen with a bloodstained shirt the same night, so Shyam suspects that he killed Sampath. The arrival of Mutthanna, a retired cop, who investigated the case decades ago, and actress Madhuri into the plot, makes things even more complex for Shyam. Kumar informs Shyam that Madhuri is related to the case, so Shyam goes to ask her questions, but it proves unsuccessful. Mutthanna eventually agrees to help Shyam by divulging what he investigated decades prior. He reveals that Gurudas Naidu actually didn't kill Sampath and that the blood on his shirt was from a wounded person whom he had saved. Who killed Sampath, and how the family died still remains a mystery. Madhuri is later found dead in her home. When Mutthanna and Shyam go to investigate her house, they see a picture of Madhuri wearing a necklace from the Vijayanagara Empire excavation.

A goon suddenly breaks into the house, and Shyam and Mutthanna chase after him. When they follow the goon, it leads them to a resort. In a park near the resort, Mutthanna recognizes the place where the Naidu family's car was originally burnt. Inside the resort, a political leader is giving a speech, and Shyam gets a call from Kumar to meet him. Kumar tells him that before Madhuri was an actress, she used to be a dancer who worked for gangsters. One person had a deep connection with Madhuri: Mailur Srinivas Rao, the upcoming CM of Karnataka. Meanwhile, Mutthanna discovers that the resort belongs to Mailur. Shyam goes to inspect Mailur's old home to find more evidence. He finds holy Christian objects hidden in a high shelf, which confuses Shyam because Mailur is a Hindu. He tells Mutthanna, who attends Mailur's campaign. He notices that Mailur resembles Fernandez, Gurudas Naidu's old driver.

In front of the crowd, Mutthanna shouts "Fernandez" to which Mailur reacts. He gets scared and orders his goons to abduct Mutthanna. Mutthanna manages to warn Shyam that he and Kumar are in danger, before being kidnapped. Mailur explains to Mutthanna that he found out that Gurudas Naidu was storing jewelry worth 80 lakhs in his department, so he killed Sampath to steal it in a bid to escape from poverty. And just to make sure he would escape with the money, he decided to kill the Naidu family too. Mutthanna roped another employee named Bablu into his plan, but didn't tell him about Sampath. Bablu put "sleeping pills" in the Naidu family's food, which were secretly poisoned. Gurudas Naidu's wife, daughter, and finally he himself died while Fernandez watched and laughed. A grieving Bablu threatened to tell the police about what Fernandez did, only to be warned the bag containing the pills had Bablu's fingerprints, so he would also get in trouble. Fernandez transported the Naidu family's bodies in his car, buried them, and burnt the vehicle. He used the stolen jewelry to become wealthy, assuming the identity of Mailur Srinivas Rao to avoid suspicion.

In the present, Mailur orders his goons to kill Mutthanna. Shyam arrives too late to save him, and before Mutthanna dies, he reveals Mailur's crimes. Enraged, Shyam kills the goons. He eventually discovers that Kumar is actually Bablu. Shyam goes to confront him, but the arrival of Kumar's daughter Priya forces him to leave. Afterward, Shyam visits Mailur—ostensibly to threaten him—but instead agrees to work for him. Mailur orders him to assassinate Bablu. During a car ride, Shyam stops the vehicle and shoots Kumar, but only after recording Kumar's full confession regarding Mailur and Madhuri. Kumar reveals that while trying to interview Madhuri about her necklace, he accidentally knocked her to the floor, killing her. A guilt-ridden Kumar admits he tried many times to get revenge on Mailur for manipulating and cheating him, but never had the courage to confess.

After supposedly killing Kumar, Shyam attends Mailur's felicitation ceremony and confesses to the murder. However, it is revealed that Shyam lied and Kumar is still alive. Disguised, Kumar serves Mailur poisoned milk, causing him to die in a similar manner to the Naidu family. Later, while driving with Shyam, Kumar admits he drank the remaining poison out of guilt, unable to face his daughter. He dies on the road in front of Shyam. Kumar's recording goes viral, exposing Mailur's past sins to the public. Due to his work on the case, Shyam is promoted to Inspector in the crime branch. He watches as the Naidu family's gravestone is marked with their names. Finally, it is revealed that the man Gurudas Naidu saved years ago was actually Shyam's father.

== Cast ==
- Rishi as SI K. S. Shyam, Bangalore City Traffic Police
- Anant Nag as Muthanna, a retired police inspector
- Achyuth Kumar as Kumar, Editor of Lockup News/Bablu
- Suman Ranganathan as Madhuri, actress
- Roshni Prakash as Priya, the daughter of Kumar
- Avinash as Laxman, Editor in Chief of TV7
- Sulile Kumar as Lokesh
- Sampath Maitreya as Mailuru Srinivasa Rao/Fernandes
- Sidhaartha Maadhyamika as Mr. Gurudas Naidu
- Samanvitha Shetty as Mrs. Vijayalakshmi Naidu
- Bharath Gowda as Bablu/Young age Kumar
- Siri Ravikumar as Geetha Muttanna
- Sharmila S. Karthik as Thimmakka
- Kiran Kumar as Sebastian
- Hanumanthegowda as K. Ganapathy
- Ramesh Pandit as Chalapathy

== Soundtrack ==
Kavaludaari

Soundtrack album by Charan Raj
- Released: 2019
- Recorded: 2018
- Genre: Soundtrack
- Label: PRK Audio
- Producer: Charan Raj

Charan Raj chronology
Jeerjimbe (2018)	Kavaludaari (2019)	Avane Srimannarayana (2019)

Singles from Kavaludaari
- 1. "Nigooda Nigooda" Released: Mar 05, 2019; 2. "Ide Dina" Released: Mar 11, 2019; 3. "Samshaya" Released: Mar 18, 2019

The music is composed by Charan Raj.

=== Songs ===
No.	Title	Lyrics	Singer(s)	Length
1.	"Nigooda Nigooda"	Nagarjun Sharma	Sanjith Hegde	04:40
2.	"Samshaya"	Dhananjay Ranjan	Aditi Sagar	02:42
3.	"Ide Dina"	Dhananjay Ranjan	Siddhant Sundar	04:34
4.	"Khali Khali"	Dhananjay Ranjan	Sharanya Gopinath	02:29
5.	"Kavaludaari Title Song"	Kiran Kaverappa	Puneeth Rajkumar	02:49

=== Original Motion Picture Soundtrack ===
Kavaludaari - Music From the Motion Picture

Film score by Charan Raj
- Released: 9 May 2019
- Recorded: 2018
- Venues: Bengaluru, Chennai
- Studios: 2 Bar Q studio, Chennai.; Audiokraft, Bangalore.; Cadence Studio, Bangalore.; Balaji Digi Studio, Bangalore.; Akash Audio, Bangalore.
- Genre: Feature film score
- Length: 46:58
- Label: PRK Audio
- Producer: Charan Raj

The background score of the film was appreciated by both audiences and critics alike. Following that, the original soundtrack was released on 9 May 2019 in YouTube and all other platforms.

No.	Title	Length
1.	"Naidu's Intro"	01:42
2.	"Shyam's Intro"	02:12
3.	"Kavaludaari Title"	02:48
4.	"Bones"	03:16
5.	"Muthanna's Promise"	01:33
6.	"Naidu's Truth"	02:13
7.	"Muthanna's Past"	03:10
8.	"The Suspects"	0:47
9.	"Shyam & Priya"	02:08
10.	"The Chase"	03:39
11.	"Burning Tree"	03:28
12.	"Politicians and Their Lies"	01:12
13.	"Man Behind the Mask"	03:21
14.	"Encounter 1"	03:00
15.	"Trip Down Memory Lane"	03:12
16.	"Encounter 2"	02:49
17.	"Hope"	01:16
18.	"Half Truths"	01:51
19.	"Khak the Dirt"	03:33
20.	"Countdown"	02:44
21.	"Kumar's Abyss"	02:41
22.	"Circle of Life"	02:11
Total length:		46:58

== Awards and nominations ==
Award	Category	Recipient	Result	Ref
12th Bengaluru International Film Festival 2020	Best Film in Kannada Cinema	Hemanth Rao; PRK Productions	Won	
Critics’ Choice Film Awards 2020	Best Film	PRK Productions	Nominated	
Critics’ Choice Film Awards 2020	Best Director	Hemanth M Rao	Nominated	
Critics’ Choice Film Awards 2020	Best Actor	Rishi	Won	
Critics’ Choice Film Awards 2020	Best Writing	Hemanth M Rao	Nominated	
9th South Indian International Movie Awards	Best Director	Hemanth M Rao	Nominated	
9th South Indian International Movie Awards	Best Actor	Rishi	Nominated	
9th South Indian International Movie Awards	Best Debut Producer	PRK Productions	Nominated	
9th South Indian International Movie Awards	Best Music Director	Charan Raj	Nominated	
