= Ashima Narwal =

Indian Australian actress and model

- Born: 1995; Rohtak, Haryana, India
- Citizenship: Australia
- Education: Bachelor's in Nursing
- Alma mater: University of Technology Sydney
- Occupations: Actress; Model
- Years active: 2018–present

Ashima Narwal is an Indian-Australian actress and model. In 2015, she won two titles in two different beauty pageants, Miss Sydney Australia Elegance and Miss India Global, and was also a finalist at 2012 Miss India Australia. She made her Indian movie debut in the Telugu film Natakam and Tamil film Kolaigaran. She was appointed as a Goodwill Ambassador at JV Smileys Foundation in 2023.

== Early life ==
Narwal was born in Rohtak, Haryana, India. After finishing school, she migrated to Australia for higher studies. She has a bachelor's degree in nursing from the University of Technology Sydney.

== Filmography ==
Key
†	Denotes films that have not yet been released

Year	Title	Role(s)	Language	Notes
2018	Natakam	Parvati	Telugu	Debut film
2019	Jessie	Jessie / Amrutha / Sruthi	Telugu	Triple Role
2019	Kolaigaran	Dharani / Aaradhana	Tamil	Dual role
2021	Pitta Kathalu	Indu	Telugu	Netflix film
2022	Sakala Gunabhi Rama	Swathi alias Nancy	Telugu	
2025	Rajabheema	Thulasi	Tamil	
2025	Oka Padhakam Prakaram	Sita	Telugu	

== Honours ==
- 2015 - Miss Sydney Australia Elegance
- 2015 - Miss India Global
- 2023 - Goodwill Ambassador at JV Smileys Foundation
