= Sathya (2017 Tamil film) =

2017 Indian Tamil mystery action thriller film

- Theatrical Release Poster
- Directed by: Pradeep Krishnamoorthy
- Written by: Karthick Krishna (dialogues)
- Screenplay by: Pradeep Krishnamoorthy
- Story by: Adivi Sesh
- Based on: Kshanam
- Produced by: Maheshwari Sathyaraj
- Starring: Sibi Sathyaraj; Remya Nambeesan; Varalaxmi Sarathkumar
- Cinematography: Arunmani Palani
- Edited by: Goutham Ravichandran
- Music by: Simon K. King
- Production company: Nathambal Film Factory
- Release date: 8 December 2017
- Running time: 121 minutes
- Country: India
- Language: Tamil

Sathya is a 2017 Indian Tamil-language mystery film directed by Pradeep Krishnamoorthy. An official remake of the Telugu film Kshanam (2016), the film stars Sibi Sathyaraj, Remya Nambeesan and Varalaxmi Sarathkumar. The film, produced by Maheshwari Sathyaraj under the banner Nathambal Film Factory, has music composed by Simon K. King and was released worldwide on 8 December 2017.

== Plot ==
Sathya, who is working in Sydney, gets a voice call from his ex-lover Shweta. They worked in the same office and wanted to get married, but her father arranged an alliance with an entrepreneur named Gowtham. Sathya leaves for India with the pretense of attending a marriage in their relatives' household. He takes a car for hire from Babu Khan, a travel agent. Sathya also takes a SIM card on his sister's address and stays at Hotel Marriott. Sathya meets Shweta at a restaurant and learns her five-year-old daughter Ria is missing. Things become worse when no one except Shweta, including Gowtham, believes that Ria exists. Sathya also learns about Gowtham's brother Bobby, a drug addict who regularly visits their home.

Sathya begins an informal investigation which fails many times, also inviting the ire of two Afro-American gangsters in the city. Babu, who helps them in transporting drugs, saves Sathya on humanitarian grounds. Impersonating police officer Vasanth Menon, Sathya meets Gowtham and learns that the couple was childless. Gowtham recalls Shweta being attacked by two masked men before a school to steal her car. He added that Shweta went into a coma and post-recovery started claiming that she had a five-year-old daughter named Ria. Perplexed, Sathya later watches a closed-circuit television video footage of the masked men attacking Shweta on the day when Ria went missing. Unfortunately, Ria is seen nowhere in the footage, which makes Sathya doubt Shweta's mental condition.

He confronts Shweta, who refuses to acknowledge that Ria is imaginary. Sathya sees height markings of a child on a wall, and before he could react, Shweta commits suicide. ACP Anuya Bharathwaj and Police Inspector Chowdary investigate the suicide case. Vasanth is killed in Marriott, and Babu confesses to Sathya that he saw Bobby kidnapping Ria. They meet Anuya and Chowdary and get Bobby arrested. In custody, Bobby is killed by Anuya as an act of self-defense. That same night, Vasanth's murderers attack Babu and Sathya, and Babu is killed in the process of shooting the murderers to death. Sathya watches an MMS in the murderers' phone sent by Anuya instructing to kill him. Sathya meets Anuya at her farmhouse, where Ria is hidden. Anuya reveals that Gowtham wanted to kill Ria and arranged the attack, after which she found Ria in Bobby's custody.

Gowtham wanted Shweta to suffer; he convinced all his friends and family to pretend that Ria never existed, saying Shweta cannot bear the shock of Ria's death. Before Anuya could kill Sathya, Chowdary shoots her after listening to the conversation on his way to the farmhouse with his subordinates. Gowtham is arrested and reveals that Ria was not his daughter, as a medical report confirmed him sterile in the past. Sathya recollects that on their last night together in India before separation, he and Shweta had intercourse. As Sathya realizes that Ria is his biological child and approaches her, he sees a reflection of Shweta smiling at him.

== Cast ==
- Sibi Sathyaraj as Sathya
- Ramya Nambeesan as Swetha
- Varalaxmi Sarathkumar as ACP Anuya Bharathwaj
- Baby Sherin as Ria
- Sathish as Babu Khan
- Brahmanandam as Ranga Rao
- Anandaraj as Inspector Chowdhary
- Ravi Varma as Bobby
- Arjai as Naveen
- Siddhartha Shankar as Gowtham
- Nizhalgal Ravi as Swetha's father
- Yogi Babu as Ram
- Jagan as Ganesh
- Balaji Venugopal as Vasanth Menon
- Vinodhini Vaidyanathan as Hema
- VTV Ganesh as Kothandaraman
- M. Seetharaman as ACP Velaikkaran
- Santhosh as SI Ganesh
- Sarath as Constable Reddy
- Ashok as R. Srinivas
- Aathma Patrick as Hitman
- Yogi Ram as Hitman
- Chrisitan Pepe Butudu as Nigerian
- Scarface as Nigerian
- Kuje Solomon Shedrach as Nigerian
- Noped Emmanuelp as Nigerian
- Mecennah as Stacy
- Rajesh as Anuya's husband
- Galatha Guru as Bobby's friend
- Aravind Janakiraman as Maarvaadi
- Guru as Security
- Arun as Commissioner

== Production ==
In April 2016, Sibi Sathyaraj bought the Tamil remake rights of Kshanam for his home studios, Naathambal Film Factory, and signed on Pradeep Krishnamoorthy of Saithan (2016) fame to direct the film. Although Adah Sharma, who played a pivotal role in the original, was originally considered for the role, she had to be replaced because she demanded high remuneration. Eventually, Remya Nambeesan replaced her as the film's female lead in mid-October 2016. Actors Varalaxmi Sarathkumar, Anandaraj and Sathish were cast to play pivotal characters. Ravi Varma, who played a drug addict in the original, was signed to reprise his role in this film, which marks his Tamil debut.

== Music ==
The film's soundtrack was composed by Simon K. King, previously credited as Simon on earlier films, Ainthu Ainthu Ainthu and Aindhaam Thalaimurai Sidha Vaidhiya Sigamani. The soundtrack album features six tracks, which includes three songs and three instrumentals from the original score. The track "Yavvana" was released, as a single on 29 July 2017, by actor Karthi on social media. Mrinalini Sundar of The Times of India said, "Overall, the album impresses".

== Release ==
The film was originally planned to release on 24 November 2017 but was postponed to 8 December 2017. The satellite rights of the film were sold to Sun TV.

== Critical reception ==
Professional ratings
Review scores
Source	Rating
Deccan Chronicle	4/5 stars
The Times of India	3.5/5 stars
The Indian Express	3/5 stars
Hindustan Times	3/5 stars

Thinkal Menon of The Times Of India gave 3.5 out of 5 and wrote,"Sathya is an engrossing watch which joins the list of interesting thriller films made in Tamil this year". Ashameera Aiyappan of The Indian Express gave 3 out of 5 and said, "The Sibiraj starrer is a gripping tale that doesn’t compromise on the narrative keeping you invested till the end". Sify stated, "It is Sibi Sathyaraj’s best ever performance and he is the glue that holds this film together. He delivers an intricate, nuanced performance that's hard to fault" and concluded that the film "deserves to be watched, especially for its masterful film-making. It is an intelligent edge-of-the-seat crime thriller". Haricharan Pudipeddi of Hindustan Times gave 3 out of 5 and stated, "Sathya, more or less, succeeds in what Kshanam did with the audience. It does you take you by surprise and the impact can be felt strongly if you’ve not seen the original". Anupama Subramanian of Deccan Chronicle gave 4 out of 5 and said, "Technically, Simon K King’s alluring songs and superb BGM and Arunmani Palani’s brilliant cinematography elevate the film topnotch. A well made gripping thriller, which is not to be missed".
