= Natakam =

2018 action film directed by Kalyanji Gogana

- Directed by: Kalyanji Gogana
- Written by: Kalyanji Gogana
- Screenplay by: Kalyanji Gogana
- Story by: Kalyanji Gogana
- Produced by: Radhika Srinivas; Sri Sai Deep Chatla; Praveen Gandhi; Uma Kuchipudi
- Starring: Ashish Gandhi; Ashima Narwal
- Cinematography: Anji
- Edited by: Tellaguti Manikanth
- Music by: Sai Karthik
- Production company: Shank Chakra Creations
- Distributed by: Rizwan Entertainment; Shank Chakra Creations
- Release date: 28 September 2018
- Running time: 139 minutes
- Country: India
- Language: Telugu

Natakam (transl. Play) is a 2018 Indian Telugu-language action thriller film written and directed by Kalyanji Gogana, starring Ashish Gandhi and Ashima Narwal in the lead roles. Produced by Radhika Srinivas, Sri Saideep Chatla, Praveen Gandhi and Uma Kuchipudi, Natakam features music composed by Sai Karthik and cinematography by Anji. The first look was launched by Anil Ravipudi.

The film released on 28 September 2018. It received generally mixed reviews from critics.

Further information: Dasharupakam

== Synopsis ==
Set in a village named Chintalapudi, the film revolves around Balakoteshwara Rao "Koti" (Ashish Gandhi) and his lover Parvati (Ashima Narwal). They both decide to marry, before Paravti's past intervenes, causing Koti to take action. He tries to find out about her past, and in the process, comes closer to fighting a gang of chain snatchers who plan to rob the entire village.

== Cast ==
- Ashish Gandhi as Balakoteshwara Rao "Koti"
- Ashima Narwal as Parvati
- Editor Mani as Manemma
- Rakesh Venugopal as ACP Bharat Chandra

== Soundtrack ==
Natakam

Soundtrack album by Sai Karthik
- Released: 11 September 2018
- Recorded: 2018
- Genre: Feature film soundtrack
- Length: 14:19
- Language: Telugu
- Label: iDream Music

The soundtrack, containing 5 tracks, was composed by Sai Karthik.

Track listing
No.	Title	Lyrics	Singer(s)	Length
1.	"Eda Puttinave"	Balaji	Sai Karthik	3:24
2.	"Gopala Gopala"	Kasarla Shyam	Sai Karthik	2:40
3.	"Orey Kotigada"	Kasarla Shyam, Balaji	Lipsika	3:41
4.	"Kallu"	Kasarla Shyam	Anurag Kulkarni	3:12
5.	"Guchi Guchi Chusi"	Subbaraya Sharma	Anudeep	2:02
Total length:				14:19

== Release ==
Censored with an A certificate by the Central Board of Film Certification, the film opened theatrically on 28 September 2018. Post its release, the film got leaked online along with Nawab, the Telugu dubbed version of Mani Ratnam's Tamil action film Chekka Chivantha Vaanam.

== Critical reception ==
Natakam received negative reviews from critics.

123Telugu gave it 2.5 stars out of 5, praising the actors, technical aspects and family emotions while criticizing the second half and placement of songs. Indiaglitz gave it 1.5 stars out of 5, criticizing the characterization and climax. The Times of India gave it 1.5 stars out of 5, calling it "hard to like". Mirchi9 also responded negatively with a 1.25 star out of 5 rating, praising the action sequences, twists and climax while criticizing the direction and writing.

== Home Video ==
In 2019, Natakam was made available on Amazon Prime Video.
