= Kayamai Kadakka =

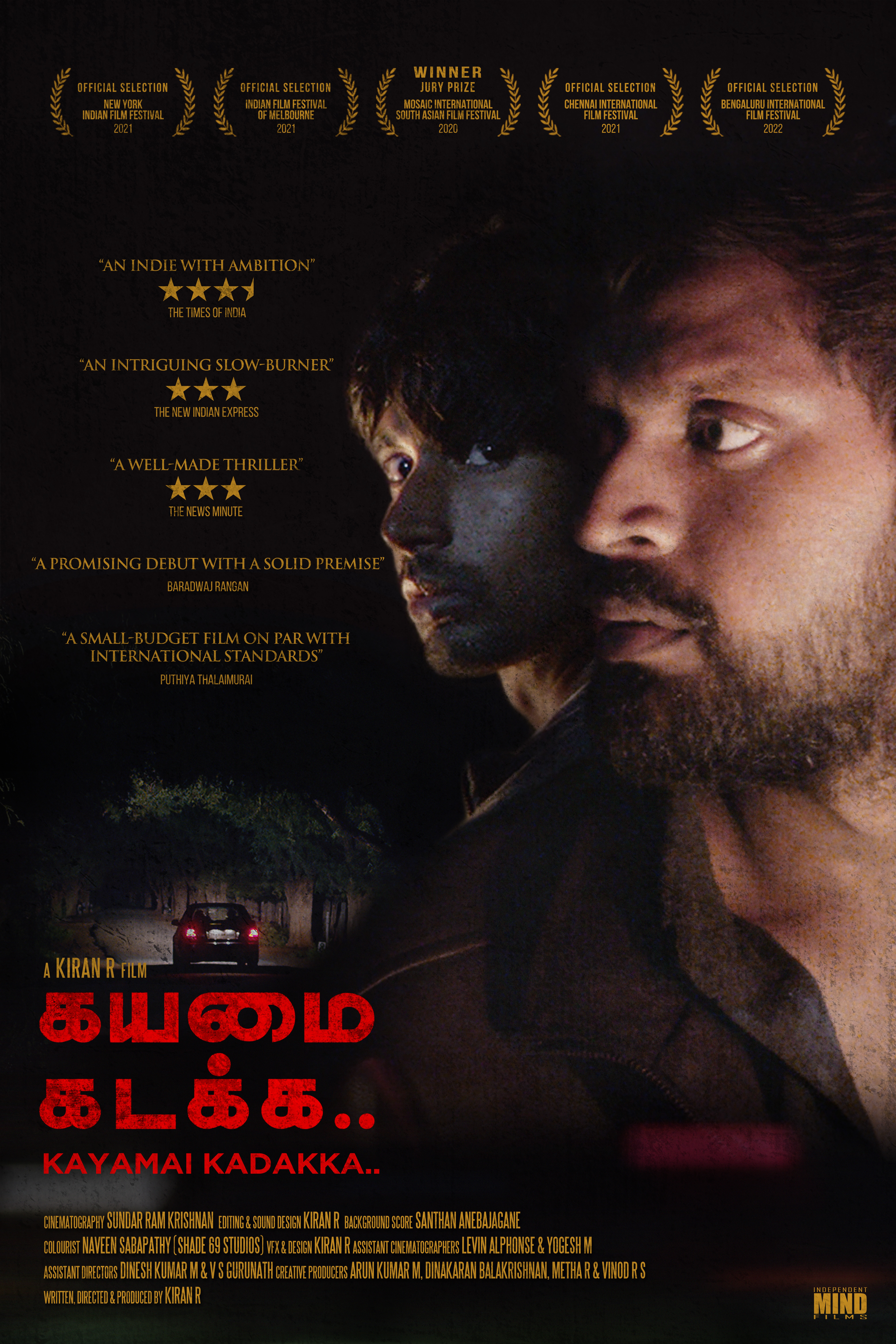
- Official Film Poster
- Directed by: Kiran R
- Written by: Kiran R
- Produced by: Kiran R
- Starring: Vatsan M Natarajan; Masanth Natarajan; Nagarajan Kannan
- Cinematography: Sundar Ram Krishnan
- Edited by: Kiran R
- Music by: Santhan Anebajagane
- Production company: Independent Mind Films
- Release date: 3 December 2021
- Running time: 104
- Country: India
- Language: Tamil

Kayamai Kadakka (transl. Crossing the depraved/immoral behavior) is a 2021 Tamil-language thriller film written, directed, edited, and produced by Kiran R and is a partially crowd-funded film. The film stars Vatsan M Natarajan, Masanth Natarajan, and Nagarajan Kannan. The film was shot in and around Coimbatore employing guerrilla-filmmaking technique with a limited crew size of five. The film was titled as Parallel Lines during its initial film festival run, before being released worldwide online on a pay-per-view platform on 3 December 2021.

== Plot ==
Two men, who know each other only through Facebook, share two things in common: their name and their opinion towards injustice to crimes against women. Their lives take a deadly turn when they both meet in person for the first time.

== Cast ==
- Vatsan M Natarajan as Santosh
- Masanth Natarajan as Santosh
- Nagarajan Kannan as Aravind
- Naveen Bala as Arun
- Vishwa Bharath as Wasim
- V. S. Gurunath as Kesavan
- Pranav Kiruthik as Bharath
- Dinesh Kimar as Pillion Rider
- Metha R as Bike Rider

== Production ==
Kiran, an erstwhile assistant of Mani Ratnam, made his debut as director through the film.

== Release ==
Kayamai Kadakka had its world premiere at Canada's Mosaic International South Asian Film Festival in December 2020, hosted online by the Digital TIFF Bell Lightbox. The film won Jury Prize at the festival and received special mention for Ensemble Performance, Screenplay, Editing, and Sound Design. The film’s lead actor Vatsan M Natarajan was nominated for ‘Best Male Debut - Tamil’ at SIIMA awards.

It was later screened at the New York Indian Film Festival 2021, the Indian Film Festival of Melbourne 2021, the Independent Film Festival of Chennai 2021 and the Caleidoscope Indian Film Festival Boston 2021.

Following its release, The Times of India described the film as "an indie with ambition that manages to punch above its weight, Kayamai Kadakka is a minimalist thriller that keeps us guessing about where the narrative will go next." Cinema Express called the film an "intriguing slow-burner", while The News Minute noted it was a "well-made thriller let down by indefensible politics".
