= Aindhaam Thalaimurai Sidha Vaidhiya Sigamani =

2014 Indian film by L. G. Ravichandar

- Theatrical release poster
- Directed by: L. G. Ravichandar
- Written by: L. G. Ravichandar
- Produced by: Pushpa Kandaswamy; S. Mohan
- Starring: Bharath; Nandita Swetha
- Cinematography: P. G. Muthiah
- Edited by: Vijay
- Music by: Simon
- Production company: Rajam Productions
- Release date: 22 August 2014
- Running time: 173 minutes
- Country: India
- Language: Tamil

Aindhaam Thalaimurai Sidha Vaidhiya Sigamani (transl. Fifth generation siddha specialist Sigamani) also known by the initialism ATSVS, is a 2014 Indian Tamil-language comedy film written and directed by L. G. Ravichandar. The film features Bharath, making it his 25th project as an actor and Nandita Swetha in the leading roles, while Simon composes the film's music. The film was released on 22 August 2014.

== Plot ==
The film begins with Sigamani, a young student, refusing to go to school. His father, after having heated arguments with the school teacher, says his son does not have to go to school. Thus, Sigamani grows up illiterate and uneducated. After 25 years, he has grown up to be a siddha specialist, following his family's roots. There is also a marriage broker in this story, Vijay Sethupathy, who tries hard to find an educated girl for Sigamani, but he is unable to. Due to the fact that Sigamani is uneducated, he is easily cheated by his friends. His only trustable friend is Paalpandi. In desperation to marry an educated girl, Sigamani plans to wait outside a college to find a girl to love. He then sees Nandini and decides to go after her. One day, Sigamani and Paalpandi follow Nandini and end up in her house. After listening to an unknown phone call, Nandini's father Chinnadurai mistakes Sigamani to be a doctor who has studied MBBS and arranges for the marriage, which also takes place successfully and Sigamani is happy as his dream of marrying an educated girl has come true. Before the interval, Ravichandar places another major twist in the story to keep the audience in the edge of their seats.

== Cast ==
- Bharath as Aindhaam Thalaimurai Sidha Vaidhiya Sigamani
- Nandita Swetha as Nandhini
- Thambi Ramaiah as Silambu Chinnadurai
- Karunakaran as Paalpandi
- M. S. Bhaskar as Vijay
- Imman Annachi as Sivakarthikeyan
- Manobala as Soori
- Chaams as Sarvanana Bhavan supervisor
- Mayilsamy as Bhai
- Singampuli as Vijay Sethupathy
- Robo Shankar as Mohanlal
- Swaminathan as Santhanam
- Kadhal Dhandapani as Sigamani's father
- Badava Gopi as Sigamani's friend
- Kottachi as Sivagami's friend
- Soundararaja as Thiru
- Kovai Senthil as Ward boy
- Bose Venkat as Trust Manager
- Scissor Manohar as Police constable
- Nellai Siva as Police inspector
- Kadhal Saravanan as Malayali
- Pandu as Police inspector
- Madhan Bob as Dr. Tippu Sultan MBBS
- Komal Kumar as Dr. Sathish Kumar
- Renuka as Sigamani's mother
- Dr. Sharmila as Dr. Sathish Kumar's wife
- Bayilvan Ranganathan as History teacher
- Ravi Venkataraman as Police Officer
- Kili Ramachandran
- Velmurugan
- Robert (cameo in "Onnuna Rendu Varum")
- Gaana Bala (cameo in "Ainthaam Thalaimurai Siddha Vaidhya Sigaamani")
- Yabama JO (cameo in "Ainthaam Thalaimurai Siddha Vaidhya Sigaamani")

== Production ==
In December 2013, it was reported that Bharath and Nandita would come together for a comedy film to be directed by L. G. Ravichandran. Bharath's character was inspired by a relative of Ravichandran. As part of their research, the makers met various siddha practitioners across Tamil Nadu. Over twenty comedy actors notably joined the film, increasing its scale. Filming locations included Palani and Pollachi.

== Soundtrack ==
The soundtrack was composed by Simon. It also featured Vijay Antony singing a complete song for the first time, for a composer other than himself. The album launch was held on 2 July 2014. The audio was released by veteran director K. Balachander. Karthik of Milliblog stated, "Simon continues to show promise after Ainthu Ainthu Ainthu!".

Track listing
No.	Title	Lyrics	Singer(s)	Length
1.	"Ainthaam Thalaimurai Siddha Vaidhya Sigaamani"	Simon	Chinnaponnu, Sheeba Truman, Sathya Prakash, Simon, Yabama JO
2.	"Onnuna Rendu Varum"	Yugabharathi	Vijay Antony, Sunidhi Chauhan
3.	"En Anbe"	Yugabharathi	Vijay Prakash, Ramya NSK
4.	"The Elarai"	Gana Bala	Gana Bala, Feat : Yabama JO
5.	"Kandangi Selai"	Yugabharathi	Hariharasudan

== Critical reception ==
M Suganth of The Times of India wrote, "ATSVS is a film so dated that by the interval the reek of staleness is so strong that we start looking at the ticket to see if there was an expiry date mentioned". Sify wrote that the film is a "totally outdated illogical film. Such kind of comedy films used to work in the 1980s and early 90s, but modern audiences ask too many questions". Baradwaj Rangan wrote for The Hindu, "The story is something that appears to have been scraped up from the reject pile of K. Bhagyaraj's scripts, circa the 1980s". R S Prakash of Bangalore Mirror reviewed the film more favourably, rating it 3 stars out of 5 and wrote, "The debutant director has tried to highlight the importance of education stressing that it's imperative for every parent to send their children to school. Looks like the first-time filmmaker has been trained well".
