= Ainthu Ainthu Ainthu =

2013 Indian film by Sasi

- Poster
- Directed by: Sasi
- Screenplay by: Sasi
- Story by: Aravind-Sureshkumar
- Produced by: Sithiran; Saashi Theyagason
- Starring: Bharath; Chandini Sreedharan; Erica Fernandes; Sudesh Berry
- Cinematography: Saravanan Abimonyu
- Edited by: M. Subarak
- Music by: Simon K. King
- Production company: Chennai Cinema (India) Pvt. Ltd
- Distributed by: Chennai Cinema (India) Pvt. Ltd
- Release date: 10 August 2013
- Running time: 147 minutes
- Country: India
- Language: Tamil

Ainthu Ainthu Ainthu (transl. Five Five Five) is a 2013 Indian Tamil-language romantic psychological action thriller film directed by Sasi, based on a story by Aravind-Sureshkumar. The film stars Bharath and Chandini Sreedharan in the lead roles, with Erica Fernandes and Santhanam appearing in supporting roles.

Ainthu Ainthu Ainthu was released on 10 August 2013 and was regarded as a comeback hit for Bharath, becoming the highest-grossing film of his career. It was later unofficially remade in Hindi as Baaghi 4 (2025).

== Plot ==
Aravind had met with a terrible accident seven months ago that left him physically and emotionally scarred. He is currently living with his elder brother, Gopal, and is being treated for some psychotic disorder.

Aravind claims that during the accident, his girlfriend Liyana was with him, and she died. The strange thing is that such a girl does not seem to exist at all. No one has seen or even heard of her; she does not appear in the student list in her college or even the census reports. She is not mentioned in the newspaper reports of the accident either, and some strangers are occupying her home. The psychiatrist thinks that Liyana is a figment of Aravind's imagination and exists only in his mind.

Unable to convince even Gopal of her existence, Aravind tries to get on with his life by going back to work. Here he meets Manjari, a colleague in a software company called Paayal Infotech which is owned by CEO Chitranjan. Manjari sympathises with Aravind and tries to help find some clues to Liyana's identity. Despite all evidence against Liyana's existence, memories of her and their love continue to haunt Aravind. Fortunately for him, a chance meeting with Liyana's aunt sets the ball rolling (Aravind obtains all the information from Liyana's aunt, who is not really her aunt but instead pretends to be, and she gets killed by a goon, who is killed by Aravind in a few seconds).

After that, things begin to unravel. Aravind finds out that Chitranjan is torturing him. The reason for doing this is that Liyana bears a striking resemblance to Chitranjan's deceased lover, Payal, so to marry her, Chitranjan devised a plan to torture Aravind by involving Manjari in this scheme, and Gopal is killed in the ensuing chaos. Aravind kills Manjari and the henchmen. Chitranjan narrates that the doctor was a fake person set up by him to fool Aravind, and also threatened Gopal to pretend ignorance about Liyana. The doctor tortures Aravind with a planned shock treatment to make him go insane, but he is completely healthy.

Aravind then kills both the doctor and Chitranjan and unites with Liyana, who is alive.

== Cast ==
- Bharath as Aravind
- Chandini Sreedharan (Credited as Mrithika) in a dual role as
  - Liyana "Liya" George
  - Paayal
- Erica Fernandes as Manjari
- Santhanam as Gopal
- Sudesh Berry as Chitranjan
- Raj Bharath as Nikhil
- T. V. Rathnavelu as Dr. Anand Moorthy
- Lakshmi as Liyana's aunt
- Manobala as Yoga Instructor
- John Vijay as Special appearance
- Swaminathan as G.R.
- World Gym Siva
- Sathish Krishnan as Special appearance

== Production ==
After the moderate success of his romantic film, Poo, Sasi began work on his next, an action entertainer, in late 2008 and worked on the script of the film for almost two years. Bharath was signed on to play the lead role in mid-2010 and in interviews since signing the project, he has expressed how important the film will be to his career. The shoot of the film began in June 2011. Bharath bulked up for his role, sporting six-pack for the film, which he has been maintaining ever since.

== Soundtrack ==
Ainthu Ainthu Ainthu

Soundtrack album to Ainthu Ainthu Ainthu by Simon
- Released: 15 April 2013
- Recorded: 2012
- Genre: Feature film soundtrack
- Language: Tamil
- Label: Sony Music
- Producer: Simon

Simon chronology
Ainthu Ainthu Ainthu (2013)	Aindhaam Thalaimurai Sidha Vaidhiya Sigamani (2014)

The film score and soundtrack of Ainthu Ainthu Ainthu are composed by Simon, making his debut as a film composer through this film. "Elavu", a single track from the album, was released on 5 April by actor Arya. The song "Elavu" marks the first time ever featuring an oppari genre in hip hop, where it was critically acclaimed and greatly received. The audio was released by the director Shankar and was received by actor Dhanush. The launch of the film's album was held on 15 April 2013.

Track listing
No.	Title	Lyrics	Singer(s)	Length
1.	"Vizhiyile Vizhiyile"	Na. Muthukumar	Haricharan, Chinmayi, Blaaze	5:11
2.	"Mudhal Mazhai Kaalam"	Na. Muthukumar	Deepak Doddera, Preethika	4:28
3.	"Rowdy Girls"	Na. Muthukumar	Preethika, Sheeba Truman	3:25
4.	"Kadhal Indha Kadhal"	Na. Muthukumar	Sathyaprakash, Kalyani	3:38
5.	"Elavu"	Simon	Simon	3:34
6.	"Saregama"	BSK	Sathyaprakash	1:13
7.	"Ghanni Khamma"	Noel Rodrigues, Heena D.	Meghana Dandekar	1:44
Total length:				23:13

== Release ==
555 was originally scheduled to release on 15 August 2013, coinciding with Independence day, but was brought forward to 10 August. It was later dubbed in Hindi as Paanch Ka Punch.

== Reception ==
Behindwoods said, "Sasi is a master teller when it comes to narrating a story about love and its finer aspects, and there would always be a kind of poignancy in them. 555 is no exception. In Arvind Sureshkumar's story, Sasi has also used a lot of action and suspense to drive home his point. There are adequate twists and turns in the narration to make the audience engrossed in the enterprise."

A review from Sify gave 4 stars out of 5 and said, "Director Sasi, who has made few realistic films in the past, has made a hardcore action entertainer with romance and suspense, a new genre for him. Though his intentions are noble and Bharath has put in a lot of effort, the film is far from being watchable and fails to impress."

Prashanth Reddy of Desimartini said, "A few minutes into the film, I smugly told myself how I expected it to end; my predictions couldn't have been more wrong. That's the one thing about Ainthu Ainthu Ainthu that I love: it always kept me puzzled about the happenings and continuously piled mounds of absurd as it moved forward." and added, "The kind of epic back story and sentimentality it lends its antagonist is sheer rip-roaring awesomeness. The non-linear screenplay is a huge plus in making the film interesting."

Indiaglitz.com said, "Bharath has put his heart and soul in this movie, making it worth the wait. His transformation from an urban cool dude to a steel gritted toned angry hunk is amazing, even though the justification for his clenched body is never shown in a convincing manner. That said, this might be the movie that could bring back him to the limelight again. The rest of the cast are adequate enough to fill their roles neatly."

M Suganth of The Times of India gave 3/5 and said, "Sasi, who has so far made soft films like Sollamale and Poo, tries his hand at a commercial thriller with action, suspense, and of course, the inevitable romance. While the director's intent in giving us a fresh and different commercial film is evident, sadly, he doesn't manage to sidestep the genre's pitfalls."

S Saraswathi of Rediff said Ainthu Ainthu Ainthu is a romantic thriller that has all the necessary twists and turns which will definitely entertain the audience.
