= Market Raja MBBS =

2019 Indian Tamil-language action comedy film

- Theatrical release poster
- Directed by: Saran
- Written by: Saran
- Produced by: S. Mohan
- Starring: Arav; Nikesha Patel
- Cinematography: K. V. Guhan
- Edited by: Gopi Krishna
- Music by: Simon K. King
- Production company: Surabi Films
- Release date: 29 November 2019
- Country: India
- Language: Tamil

Market Raja MBBS (transl. Market King MBBS) is 2019 Indian Tamil-language film written and directed by Saran and produced by S. Mohan. The film stars Arav in the title role in his lead film debut alongside Nikesha Patel. The music was composed by Simon K. King, while cinematography was handled by the director's younger brother, K. V. Guhan and editing by Gopi Krishna. The film released on 29 November 2019. The film's title is similar to Saran's Vasool Raja MBBS (2004).

== Cast ==
- Arav as Market Raja
- Nikesha Patel as Steffany
- Kavya Thapar as Vani Sri
- Vihaan as Chandrababu
- Nassar as Sivaji Muthaiyah, Vani Sri's father
- Radhika Sarathkumar as Sundari Bhai, Market Raja's mother
- Rohini as Latha, Chandrababu's mother
- Adithya Menon as Dasappan (Das)
- Chaams as Lawyer Vardharajan (Vardha)
- Pradeep Rawat as Manohar Singh
- Sayaji Shinde as Godfather Radha
- Hareesh Peradi as Minister Ramdoss
- Nithin Sathya as Neelakandan
- Munishkanth as Gunaseelan
- Devadarshini as Kalavathy, an exorcist
- Vijaya Patti as Market Raja's grandmother
- Madhan Bob as Nagesh Babu
- "Boys" Rajan as Commissioner
- Vaiyapuri as a Demo Patient
- Shanthi Mani as Latha's assistant

== Soundtrack ==
The soundtrack was composed by Simon K. King, in his first association with director Saran.

Track listing
No.	Title	Lyrics	Singers	Length
1.	"Kannale"	Dhamayanthi	Sanah Moidutty, Yazin Nizar	4:31
2.	"Dha Dha"	Rokesh	Simon K. King	3:36
3.	"Bailaama"	Ku. Karthik	Sharanya Gopinath	3:21
4.	"Kanne Karuvizhiye"	Ku. Karthik	K. S. Chithra	4:19
Total length:				15:47

== Release ==
Initially, the film was scheduled to release on 8 November 2019, but it was postponed due to unavoidable reasons. Later, it was announced that the film would be released worldwide on 29 November 2019.
