= Krishan Maheson =

Sri Lankan Tamil rapper (born 1983)

Krishan Maheson கிரிசான் மகேசன்
- Born: 4 May 1983 (age 43); Colombo, Sri Lanka
- Genre: Tamil Hiphop
- Occupations: Music producer; rapper; playback singer

Krishan Maheson (Tamil: கிரிசான் மகேசன், born 4 May 1983) is a rapper from Sri Lanka. Along with his brother Gajan and MC Yauwanan, he is considered a pioneer in the Sri Lankan Tamil rap scene. He currently lives in Sydney, Australia

== Career ==
Maheson was a founding member of the musical duo Urban Sound with his brother Gajan. In 1998, they released "Smooth Flow". Influenced by local hip-hop groups such as Rude Boy Republic and mentored by Brown Boogie Nation, the duo released several English rap singles and gained a following in Colombo. Urban Sound disbanded in early 2000 when Gajan joined Bathiya and Santhush and Maheson joined Iraj Weeraratne. Maheson was featured on several singles produced by Weeraratne, including "Ninda Noyena Hadawe", "Ran Ran Ran", "Koththu song", and "Mata Aloke Genadhewi".

After completing his debut solo album, Asian Avenue, Maheson moved to the United Kingdom for university studies in 2005. Asian Avenue was released by Universal Music India in 2006, becoming the first Sri Lankan album released by the label. Asian Avenue was produced by Yohan Ramírez.

Maheson's second album, Avadhaaram, received mixed reviews from critics. However, two singles from the album gained international attention. "Amudhame" was nominated by BBC Radio 1 as one of the most promising songs of 2008, and received high rotation from British DJ Nihal. "Amudhame" also earned Maheson an award for best hip-hop solo act at the inaugural Independent Asian Music Awards (AVIMA) in 2009. "Oh Oh Endhan Darling" achieved commercial success, receiving airplay at radio stations and clubs globally and was included in Radio Express’s Dance Express compilation alongside tracks by artists like Jason Derulo, Pitbull, and Rihanna. The song was also featured on the compilation album Best of Hip Hop and RNB 2010 Vol. 3, highlighting 100 selected tracks worldwide.

Maheson operates his digital label, Connect Media, as well as a studio in Colombo. He has contributed to several Kollywood movie soundtracks, including Naan, Yuvan Yuvadhi, Sattapadi Kuttram, Amba Saumdhra Ambani, and Kabadadhaari.

Earlier in his career, Maheson was a member of the ILL Noize hip-hop crew with Iraj Weeraratne. They released Sri Lanka's first trilingual album, Iraj, in 2001. He was featured on hit singles "Ran Ran", "Ninda Noyena Hanadawe", and "J Town Story", which is considered Sri Lanka's first Tamil rap song. In 2005, Maheson released his solo debut album, Asian Avenue, under M Entertainments and Universal Music India. It is often considered as Sri Lanka's first Tamil hip-hop album. This release in South India helped Maheson extend his reach to young Tamil diaspora communities in Europe and Canada in the mid-2000s.

After a five-year break, he returned to music with the release of his album Avathaaram in 2010. He later worked in the South Indian film music industry with music directors Vijay Antony, D. Imman, and Paul Jacob. Maheson was featured on the 2012 single "Makkayaala" from the film Naan and has appeared in films such as Amba Samuthra Ambani, Yuvan Yuvadhi, Sattapadi Kuttram, Om Obama, and Naan.

Maheson received the Best Rap Act award at the local DMVA 2011 and the Best Hip-hop solo act award at AVIMA (Malaysia) in 2009.

== Discography ==
- Urban Sound Mix tape (1999)
- Iraj (2004)
- Asian Avenue (2005)
- Avadhaaram (2010)
