= Archana Sarat =

Indian author

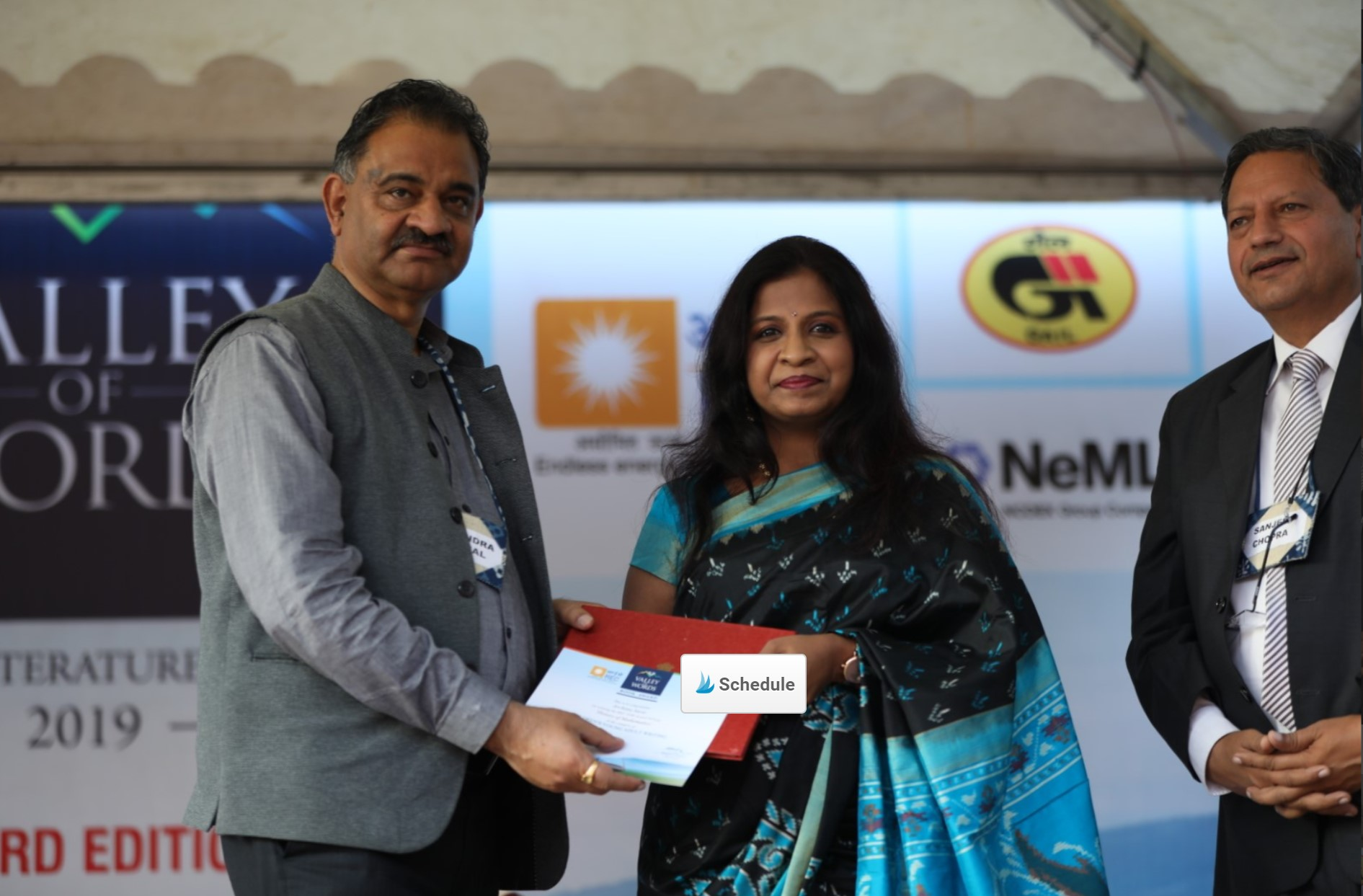
- Author Archana Sarat receiving the VoW Book Award 2019 for her book Tales from the History of Mathematics.

Archana Sarat is an Indian author, a short story writer, a flash fiction author and poet. She is known for her 2016 novel, Birds of Prey, a psychological crime thriller. The novel has been adapted for the screen in Tamil on the OTT platform, Aha Tamil. It is titled Irai, and stars R. Sarathkumar. It is directed by Rajesh M. Selva and produced by Radaan Mediaworks.

== Early life ==
Archana Sarat was born in Thoothukudi or Tuticorin, a port city in South Tamil Nadu. She was raised in Chennai. After being schooled at Sindhi Model Senior Secondary School at Kellys, she went on to obtain a bachelor's degree in commerce from M.O.P. Vaishnav College at Nungambakkam, Chennai. She also pursued her Chartered Accountancy Course. Currently, she is a partner in her family firm, M/S P.T.Ponnaiah & Co, which was established in the year 1979 offering services in the fields of Audit and Assurance, Taxation, Business Formation, Business Support, Business Advisory and other related fields.

She is married to Sarat, a Corporate Lawyer and Company Secretary, and lives in India.

== Books and publications ==
Archana Sarat is the author of Birds of Prey, a gripping psychological crime thriller. She is also the author of Sleeping Dogs, a mystery thriller, that was released in September 2022.

She writes flash fiction every Saturday, titled "Saturday Shots." She is the author of Tit for Tat, an ebook collection of flash fiction stories, published by Readomania. Her flash fiction also appears in the Sunday Literature Section of the Free Press Journal Newspaper.

Women's Web declared her book, Birds of Prey as one among ‘21 Noteworthy Debut Books By Indian Women Authors Published Recently That Are A Must Read.’ The novel, which has been adapted for the screen in Tamil is available on Aha Tamil and is titled Irai. It stars R. Sarathkumar and is directed by Rajesh M. Selva and produced by Radaan Mediaworks.

Archana's book, Tales from the History of Mathematics, won the Best Children's/ Young Adults Book 2019 at the Valley of Words International Literary Festival at Dehardun, India.

Archana is the author of finance-related articles in The Times of India, The Economic Times, The SEBI and Corporate Laws Journal, The CA Newsletter, etc.

Her Science Fiction short story was published in April 2008 in the Science Reporter, a magazine run by CSIR – NISCAIR (Council of Scientific and Industrial Research – National Institute of Science Communication and Information Resources). Her short stories and poetry have been published in the DNA Me Magazine, the Chicken Soup for the Soul series, Vengeance - A NaNoWriMo India Anthology, the Jukebox Anthology, the Telegram and the GloMag Journal.

=== Novels ===
- Birds of Prey (Readomania)
- Tales from the History of Mathematics (Readomania)
- Sleeping Dogs (Readomania)

=== Short story collections ===
- Tit for Tat (Readomania)

=== Anthologies (co-authored) ===
- Vengeance (NaNoWriMo India Anthology)
- Jukebox (Readomania)
- Chicken Soup for the Indian Teenage Soul
- Chicken Soup for the Indian Romantic Soul
- Chicken Soup for the Indian Mother's Soul
