= List of films banned in Malaysia =

This is a list of films banned in Malaysia, as they are viewed by the Malaysian government for violating relevant laws and regulations, or because of other political and religious factors. Films that are assigned the Tidak Diluluskan Untuk Tayangan ("Not Passed for Screening") category by the Film Censorship Board of Malaysia are banned for sale, possession, distribution and screening. Screening rejected films, possessing, selling, or even owning them in private is forbidden and strictly enforced and can be punished with severe fines, up to 20 years' imprisonment or both.

== List ==
Year	Name	Notes	Ref.
1936	The Bohemian Girl	Banned due to its Romani themes. It was passed five decades later during the 1990s with a VCD release from Warner Malaysia Video.	
1946	The Big Sleep	Banned originally, but passed 53 years later in 1999 with a VCD release and a delayed DVD release from Warner Malaysia Video.	
1971	A Clockwork Orange	Banned due to its explicit sexual and violent content. A censored version was released on DVD after several years.	
1973	The Exorcist	Banned due to intense violence and cruelty.	
1975	Jaws	Banned originally for the depictions of intense violence, but was eventually passed for a VCD release and a long-delayed DVD release by Movie Master.	
1977	Saturday Night Fever	Banned by Cinema International Corporation's Paramount Malaysia division, reportedly because it was deemed to cause chaos in the community.	
1979	Monty Python's Life of Brian	Banned because of blasphemous content.	
1980	Cannibal Holocaust	Banned due to its extremely violent content and actual on-screen killings of animals.	
1983	Scarface	Banned due to excessive violence, strong language and drug usage.	
1986	Platoon	Banned due to vulgar language and violence.	
1993	Schindler's List	Banned initially; the Malaysian Film Censorship Board described the film as “propaganda with the purpose of asking for sympathy.” A heavily censored DVD version was later released in 2004.	
1994	Pulp Fiction	Banned due to intense violence, drug abuse, explicit nudity, and scenes of sexual violence.	
1994	The Shawshank Redemption	Banned for depiction of cruelty, profanity, and violence. Later released on DVD.	
1995	Babe	Banned due to "babe" sounding similar to "babi," the Malay word for "pig," which is non-halal; also portrays pigs in a positive light.	
1996	Maachis	Maachis was banned in Malaysia by the censor board on grounds that "it may hurt religious sentiments.	
1998	Barney's Great Adventure	Banned because the censors found it to be unacceptable for children to watch, without providing any further explanation.	
1998	The Prince of Egypt	Never released in cinemas because the censor body ruled that the film is "insensitive for religious and moral reasons". The film was passed for VCD and DVD release by Berjaya HVN.	
1998	Babe: Pig in the City	Banned due to its title and subject matter not being halal (pigs—whether or not they're used as food—are considered highly taboo in the Muslim religion, of which Malaysia has a sizeable population). Released direct-to-VHS when the ruling was overturned almost a year later.	
1998	Saving Private Ryan	Never released in cinemas due to Spielberg's previous controversial film, passed for VCD and DVD release by Berjaya HVN	
1999	Austin Powers: The Spy Who Shagged Me	Never released in cinemas due to comedic sexual content as regarded to be almost pornographic, but passed for a VCD release and delayed DVD release by Sunny Film Productions.	
2001	Zoolander	Banned for its offensive depiction of the country as an impoverished country dependent on sweatshops, and involving a plot to assassinate a prime minister.	
2003	Bruce Almighty	It was banned for imaging God as an ordinary man and is deemed blasphemous to Islam. The ban was lifted four years later with the 18-PL rating.	
2004	The Passion of the Christ	The film's viewing was restricted solely to adult Christian viewers.	
2005	Brokeback Mountain	Banned for its "favorable" depiction of homosexuality.	
2007	I Don't Want to Sleep Alone	Banned based on 18 counts of incidents shown in the film depicting the country "in a bad light" for cultural, ethical, and racial reasons. However, they later allowed the film to be screened in the country after Tsai agreed to censor parts of the film according to the requirements of the Censorship Board.	
2010	Rumah Dara (Macabre)	Banned due to horror violence, gore, and cannibalism.	
2010	Prince of Persia: The Sands of Time	Originally banned, but later passed and was given a release in May 2010.	
2013	The Conjuring	Originally banned for its strong horror themes and gruesome violence, but later passed and released by Warner Bros. in July 2013.	
2013	Vishwaroopam	Shown in local cinemas on 24 January 2013, but the approval was withdrawn the next day, in accordance with a directive from the Home Ministry following concerns from the public that the film portrays Islam in a negative light. Malaysian authorities lifted the ban on 19 February 2014, however, after several scenes were cut.	
2013	The Purge	Originally banned due to high-impact violence; also banned for scary images, political content, and anarchism. However, it was later passed and was released in August 2013.	
2013	Kick-Ass 2	Originally banned for its vulgar title, but later passed and released by Universal Studios in August 2013.	
2013	Dallas Buyers Club	Banned due to a religious, cultural and moral grounds.	
2013	The Wolf of Wall Street	Banned for scenes of sex, drug abuse, and offensive language.	
2013	The New Village	Banned after causing riots and chaos during its initial screening, and for supposedly promoting communism.	
2014	Banglasia	The film was heavily criticised by the LPF (Film Censorship Board) and KDN (Home Ministry department), which received 31 official notes and orders to re-shoot the movie. On 12 February 2019, the ban was lifted when LPF approved the film undergone 7 scenes reedits or cut, a small reshoot and updates. In addition, the new version of the film was release under new title Banglasia 2.0.	
2014	Annabelle	Originally banned for its horror themes and gruesome violence, but later passed and given a release in October 2014.	
2014	The Purge: Anarchy	Originally banned due to its strongly-violent themes and supposed promotion of anarchy, but later passed and given a release in September 2014.	
2014	The Raid 2	Banned on its initial release due to excessive violence.	
2014	Noah	Banned due to religious content and its depictions of the prophets.	
2015	Fifty Shades of Grey	Banned due to strong sexual content and graphic nudity. Passed cut for TV release in 2018 and was given an 18 rating.	
2015	Unfriended	Originally banned due to strong horror themes, but later passed and given a release in April 2015.	
2015	Mad Max: Fury Road	Originally banned for possible abuse-related themes, but later passed and given a release in May 2015.	
2015	The Danish Girl	Banned due to sexual and nude content as well on grounds of moral depravity.	
2015	Fundamentally Happy	Banned due to containing elements that may be sensitive to the feelings of Malaysian Malays and may be interpreted by Malaysian Malays as an attempt to reflect the community's attitude towards those who abuse the weak to fulfil their desires.	
2016	The Purge: Election Year	Originally banned for its political and violent themes, but later passed and given a release in July 2016.	
2017	Happy Death Day	Originally banned for horror and some sexual themes, but later passed and given a release in October 2017.	
2017	Alien: Covenant	Originally banned for horror and possible sexual themes, but later passed and given a release in May 2017.	
2017	Baywatch	Originally banned for possible sexual themes, but later passed and given a release in June 2017.	
2017	Annabelle: Creation	Originally banned for horror and religious themes, but later passed and given a release in August 2017.	
2017	mother!	Originally banned for possible sexual or horror themes, but later passed and given a release in September 2017.	
2017	A Bad Moms Christmas	Originally banned for its promotion of immoral behaviour, but later passed and given a release in December 2017. Also released on streaming media.	
2017	The Disaster Artist	Banned for some indecent scenes in certain scenes.	
2018	Padmaavat	Banned for negatively portraying Alauddin Khalji, a Muslim ruler of medieval India.	
2019	Kadaram Kondan	Banned per orders of LPF (Film Censorship Board of Malaysia) due to the story's portrayal of the Royal Malaysian Police (PDRM) in a negative light and for portraying police officers as corrupt and for scenes which supposedly inaccurately and misleadingly represent the police force. In addition, the makers of the film failed to get necessary police permits to shoot scenes in Malaysia; the Malaysian law requires that film production receives permission from the relevant authorities such as FINAS, PUSPAL and others before shooting.	
2019	Super Deluxe	Banned by LPF (Film Censorship Board of Malaysia) due to sensitive and mature content.	
2019	Dha Dha 87	Banned by LPF (Film Censorship Board of Malaysia) due to sensitive and mature content.	
2019	90 ML	Banned by LPF (Film Censorship Board of Malaysia) due to sensitive and mature content.	
2019	Hustlers	Initially scheduled to be released on 19 September 2019, but the film's local distributor suddenly called off the press preview screening a day before. Later, they confirmed that LPF (Film Censorship Board of Malaysia) are not sanctioning the release of the film due to erotic and nudity scenes on the film.	
2019	Abominable	Banned due to a scene involving the nine-dash line, a contested demarcation line used by China to lay claim over a portion of the South China Sea, and also due to the film's distributor refusing to cut or digitally alter the scene. Passed for DVD release by United International Pictures Malaysia.	
2020	Babi	Banned due to word Babi, directly translates to "pig" in Malay and probably due to its provoking nature.	
2021	The Battle at Lake Changjin	Banned due to guerrilla war against communist insurgents until 1989, the dissemination of communist ideology is illegal.	
2021	May You Stay Forever Young	Banned due to concerns that it "glorifies violent protests" and could potentially "affect Malaysia-China bilateral relations".	
2023	Pulau	Banned in Terengganu, due to "sensitivity".	
2023	Mentega Terbang	Banned in Malaysia due to its content which reflected wrongly on some religious beliefs.	
2023	Siksa Neraka (Tourment of Hell)	Banned in Malaysia and Brunei due to violence of graphics and sensitive issue.	
2026	Primetime	No specific official reason or public statement has been released by the LPF detailing why the film was blocked.	

=== The Walt Disney Company ===
==== Walt Disney Pictures ====
Year	Name	Notes	Ref.
2017	Beauty and the Beast	Banned due to homosexual references in the movie. Disney rejected the Film Censorship Board's suggestions for an edited version, and thus held it from Malaysian release until several days later where it was released without any cuts.	

==== Pixar Animation Studios ====
Year	Name	Notes	Ref.
2022	Lightyear	Banned due to the depiction of a same-sex kiss. Later released on Disney+ Hotstar with an 18 rating.	

==== Marvel Studios ====
Year	Name	Notes	Ref.
2022	Thor: Love and Thunder	Banned due to the depiction of a LGBT Elements. Cinema operators in Malaysia are in the dark over the hold-up in the release of the film in Malaysia. Later released on Disney+ Hotstar with an 18 rating.	

==== 20th Century Studios ====
Year	Name	Notes	Ref.
1956	The King and I	Banned due to offense from neighboring country Thailand. It was passed in 2005 with a VCD release and a DVD release from FOX Malaysia.	
2009	X-Men Origins: Wolverine	Originally banned, but later passed and released from Fox Malaysia in May 2009.	

== See also ==
- List of banned films
- Cinema of Malaysia
- Film censorship in Malaysia
