= Kadaram Kondan =

Film directed by Rajesh M. Selva

- Theatrical release poster
- Directed by: Rajesh M. Selva
- Written by: Rajesh M. Selva
- Based on: Point Blank
- Produced by: Kamal Haasan; R. Ravindran
- Starring: Vikram
- Cinematography: G. Srinivas Reddy
- Edited by: Praveen K. L.
- Music by: Ghibran
- Production companies: Raaj Kamal Films International; Trident Arts
- Release date: 19 July 2019
- Running time: 114 minutes
- Country: India
- Language: Tamil

Kadaram Kondan (transl. Conqueror of Kadaram) is a 2019 Indian Tamil-language action thriller film directed by Rajesh M. Selva and produced by Kamal Haasan. The film stars Vikram in the lead role and Akshara Haasan and Abi Hassan in supporting roles. This film is a remake of the 2010 French film Point Blank. This film was shot between September 2018 and January 2019.

Kadaram Kondan was released on 19 July 2019.

== Plot ==
Dr. Vasu Rajagopalan arrives in Kuala Lumpur with his pregnant wife Aatirah and works at a hospital, where a comatose robber has been admitted. After a botched murder attempt on the robber's life by two hitmen, Vasu contacts the RMP, which assigns Inspector Kalpana Rangaswamy to the case. Upon returning home, a man knocks Vasu out and kidnaps Aatirah. After regaining consciousness, Vasu gets a call from the assailant, who asks him to release the robber in exchange for Aatirah. Kalpana learns about the robber's identity called KK, an ex-army commando, who is wanted for burglary and contraband dealing.

Kalpana rushes to the hospital with her associates Navin and Catherine, where they narrowly miss Vasu, who had managed to exfiltrate KK from the hospital. Kalpana's rival officer Vincent Rajadurai, who is notorious for brutal ways of solving crimes, is also on the heels of KK's case. Vincent explains to Kalpana that KK is connected to the recent murder of a wealthy industrialist and warns her to step aside. Vasu demands KK to release Aatirah at KL Sentral in exchange for him to be delivered safely. At the exchange point, Aatirah and KK are almost on the verge of being exchanged, but the hitmen (who had tried to kill KK earlier) arrive, forcing the duos to escape. The assailant brings Aatirah back to his hideout, but is killed by the hitmen, who forcefully abduct Aatirah.

Vasu and KK take refuge at KK's safe house. While KK is distracted, Vasu manages to contact Kalpana. Kalpana arrives at the safe house, but is shot dead by Vincent, who is revealed to be a dirty cop. After Vincent leaves, KK manages to subdue his captors and injures one of Vincent's men, where he demands the truth behind the botched burglary attempt on the industrialist's office at Petronas Towers. Umar reveals to KK that Vincent had been hired by the industrialist's son to kill his father in order for the latter to inherit his father's wealth. Vincent had recorded the event on a spy camera and had arranged for KK's boss Anand Makaio to cover their tracks.

Makaio had sent KK to the industrialist's office in the name of retrieving his case files, but is actually a trap set by Vincent who had to have someone framed for the murder. Vincent's men (who are the hitmen) had attempted to murder KK, but they had retreated after KK's accident. The police arrive at the safehouse, forcing KK and Vasu to escape. Vasu is framed for Kalpana's murder, thus making him as a wanted fugitive. The police chase the duo around the city, but they fail to catch them. Vasu begs KK to save Aatirah. KK coordinates with his associates and forms a plan to save Aatirah. Vasu learns that Aatirah's kidnapper was actually KK's younger brother Nanda. KK corners Makaio and has him create a diversion in order to distract Vincent, before killing him for his betrayal.

Aatirah is taken into police custody under Vincent's watch, where he plans to have her murdered after killing Vasu. The next day, KK puts his plan into action – KK and his associates coordinate mass robberies across the city and have the culprits arrested by the police under Vincent's jurisdiction, thus creating chaos at his police station. As KK had expected, Vincent leaves to meet Makaio (as part of the diversion). With Vincent out of the way, KK and Vasu infiltrate the police station under the guise of police officers and attempt to break into Vincent's safe – which contains the footage of the industrialist's murder. Vincent's colleague Annie attempts to have Aatirah murdered, but she is incapacitated by Vasu.

Upon discovering Makaio's murder, Vincent deduces KK's deception and rushes back, where he fights with KK. KK knocks Vincent and acquires the pen drive containing the footage of the assassination and plants it on Vasu, who has been captured by Catherine, and silently escapes. Catherine discovers the pen drive in Vasu's pocket and plays it, thus exposing Vincent, who is later arrested. Vasu is released and escorted to the hospital where Aatirah has been admitted. Aatirah is shown to have narrowly avoided a miscarriage, where she gives birth to a healthy daughter and has an emotional reunion with Vasu.

7 years later on Vasu's daughter's birthday, Vasu and Aatirah discover that Vincent has been murdered under mysterious circumstances while on parole. They deduce that KK is responsible in order to avenge Nanda's death. They also receive a gift from KK, which is actually Aatirah's necklace.

== Cast ==
- Vikram as KK, a criminal who previously used several pseudonyms
- Akshara Haasan as Aadhira
- Abi Hassan as Vasu Rajagopalan
- Lena as Kalpana Rengaswamy
- Vikas Shrivastav as Vincent Rajadurai
- Puravalan as Navin
- Ravindra Vijay as Umar Ahamed
- Cherry Mardia as Catherine Williams
- Rajesh Kumar as Amaldas David, Chief of Police
- Jasmine Kaur as Annie Jayanathan
- Siddhartha Shankar as Nandha
- Jawaharlal as Anad Makaio
- Padmini as Kumutha
- Baby Dhanyashree as Aatirah and Vasu's daughter

== Production ==
Film producer Chandrahasan initially wanted to make a film under his banner Raaj Kamal Films International with his brother Kamal Haasan starring and Rajesh M. Selva directing. Selva got this offer immediately after the release of his Thoongaavanam (2015), which also starred Kamal. But Kamal became busy in his political career, so Selva instead approached Vikram who agreed to act in the still-untitled film after being impressed with the story Selva narrated to him. Chandrahasan later died, therefore he could not produce the project.

On 30 August 2018, Kamal officially announced the still-untitled film which he would produce with Selva directing, while Vikram, Akshara Haasan, and Abi Hassan would star. Srinivas R. Gutha was announced as the cinematographer, while Praveen K. L. joined as editor. The film featured a transnational cast with artists from India, Malaysia, and Singapore. The film, which was co-produced by R. Ravindran of Trident Arts, began filming on the same day. The film's title Kadaram Kondan and first look poster were revealed on 6 November, the eve of Kamal's birthday. The film was shot in Kuala Lumpur for a month, where the shooting schedule ended in late November. Principal photography ended on 9 January 2019, with the exception of a song sequence and "a few patch works".

== Soundtrack ==
Kadaram Kondan

Soundtrack album by Ghibran
- Released: 1 May 2019 (First Single); 10 July 2019 (Second Single); 22 July 2019 (Third Single)
- Recorded: 2019
- Genre: Feature film soundtrack
- Length: 10:59
- Language: Tamil
- Label: Muzik 247

Ghibran chronology
| Athiran (2019) | Kadaram Kondan (2019) | Rakshasudu (2019) |
- Kadaram Kondan on YouTube Thaarame Thaarame on YouTube Theesudar Kuniyuma on YouTube

The soundtrack is composed by Ghibran, continuing his association with the director and Kamal after Thoongaavanam. The music rights were bought by Muzik 247.

Tamil tracklist
| No. | Title | Lyrics | Singer(s) | Length |
|---|---|---|---|---|
| 1. | "Kadaram Kondan" | Priyan, Shabir | Shruti Haasan, Shabir | 3:18 |
| 2. | "Thaarame Thaarame" | Viveka | Sid Sriram | 3:48 |
| 3. | "Theesudar Kuniyuma" | Viveka | Vikram | 3:53 |
| Total length: | | | | 10:59 |

Telugu tracklist
| No. | Title | Lyrics | Singer(s) | Length |
|---|---|---|---|---|
| 1. | "Mr.KK" | Ramajogayya Sastry | Aditya Iyengar, Geetha Madhuri | 3:18 |
| 2. | "Okka Nuvvu Chaalu" | Ramajogayya Sastry | Anudeep Dev | 3:48 |
| 3. | "Vikramarkuda Go Go Go" | Ramajogayya Sastry | Revanth | 4:10 |
| Total length: | | | | 11:16 |

== Release ==
Kadaram Kondan was released on 19 July 2019, alongside its Telugu dubbed version Mr. KK.

== Reception ==
=== Critical response ===
M. Suganth of The Times of India gave 3/5 stars and wrote "The action scenes make Kadaram Kondan a visceral experience, even though Rajesh Selva's filmmaking falls short on flair. Ghibran's energetic wall-to-wall score lends the film momentum and Vikram ensures that we don't leave disappointed." Kirubhakar Purushothaman of India Today gave 3/5 stars and wrote, "Kadaram Kondan is a decent entertainer if one is ready to overlook a few silly contrivances and over-the-top heroism."

Srivatsan S of The Hindu wrote "A 'time bomb' narrative that takes a while to explode. But when it does, it's a smart guessing game." Baradwaj Rangan wrote for Film Companion, "Vikram is terrific but once again, the actor does more for a movie than the movie does for him."

=== Box office ===
According to trade estimates, Kadaram Kondan managed to gross ₹50 crore (equivalent to ₹68 crore or US$7.0 million in 2026) in the opening weekend at the box office.

== Controversy ==
Although 90% of the film was shot in Malaysia, the film was not released there. According to Lotus Five Star (which holds the film's distribution and theatrical rights in Malaysia), the film was banned as per orders of LPF (Film Censorship Board of Malaysia) due to the story's portrayal of the Royal Malaysia Police in a negative light and for portraying police officers as corrupt and for scenes which supposedly inaccurately and misleadingly represent the police force. In addition, the filmmakers failed to get necessary police permits to shoot scenes in Malaysia; the Malaysian law requires that film production receives permission from the relevant authorities before shooting.

== See also ==
- List of films banned in Malaysia
