= Irai (TV series) =

Indian web series

- Poster
- Genre: Crime thriller
- Based on: Birds of Prey by Archana Sarat
- Screenplay by: Manoj Kumar; Rajesh Manjunath; Rajesh M. Selva
- Directed by: Rajesh M. Selva
- Starring: R. Sarathkumar; Nizhalgal Ravi; Abhishek Shankar
- Music by: Ghibran
- Country of origin: India
- Original language: Tamil
- No. of seasons: 1
- No. of episodes: 6 (list of episodes)

Production
- Cinematography: S. Yuva
- Editor: San Lokesh
- Production company: Radaan Mediaworks

Original release
- Network: Aha Tamil
- Release: 18 February 2022

Irai (transl. Prey) is an Indian Tamil-language crime thriller streaming television series produced as an Original for Aha Tamil, directed by Rajesh M. Selva. Produced by Radaan Mediaworks the series stars R. Sarathkumar in the lead role along with Nizhalgal Ravi, Abhishek Shankar, Sri Krishna Dayal and Gouri Nair. The series was based on the crime novel Birds of Prey written by Archana Sarat, and was initially announced with that same title. The series comprised six episodes and was released on Aha Tamil on 18 February 2022.

== Synopsis ==
In autumn 1985, ACP Robert Vasudevan investigates the mysterious disappearances of men from the city's affluent families and finds an inexplicable pattern in the abductions, leading him and his team to one common link. Upon conclusion of the investigation, there is only one woman who is standing between Robert and justice.

== Cast ==
- R. Sarathkumar as Robert Vasudevan
- Nizhalgal Ravi as Subbaraj
- Abhishek Shankar as Sivakumar
- Sri Krishna Dayal as Ashok Kumar
- Gouri Nair as Devi
- Ravindra Vijay
- Gokul Anand
- Karuppu Nambiar as Manikandan
- Shrisha as Anita Subramaniam
- Sriranjani Prabhu
- Rethika Srinivas as NGO Head
- Vaanmadhi
- Dinesh Damodaran as S.I Rajeev

== Reception ==
The series opened to positive reviews. Bhuvanesh Chandar of The New Indian Express rated the series with 3/5 stars, stating that, "What stands apart in this series is Sarath Kumar’s acting. The actor looks the part and is well-aware of what the role demands from him. Even in shots that can easily be tagged as ‘mass-y’, it is Robert who we see. Irai is also helped majorly by its splendid cinematography and editing. The transitions are creatively well done. If Irai goes on to tap into its enormous potential and rights its wrongs for the next season, it might just turn out to be our very own Happy Valley/Broadchurch. And we have waited long enough to deserve such content." OTTplay.com gave a rating of 2.5 out on 5 and wrote, "Irai is a web show that is appealing because of its genre and the lead. It offers viewers a crime thriller that is worth binging. However telling two stories simultaneously might throw off the audience a bit."

== Episodes ==
No. overall	No. in season	Title	Directed by	Original release date
1	1	"The Ripple Effect"	Rajesh M. Selva	18 February 2022
At the break of dawn, Kodaikanal suddenly becomes a hotspot for a high-profile influential politician missing case. Veteran police officer, ACP Robert Vasudevan is called in to investigate.
2	2	"Skeletons In The Closet"	Rajesh M. Selva	18 February 2022
Traveling back to late 80's the story unearths Sivakumar's dark past like a can of worms. In the present, Anita, the officer-in-charge of the case, begins to have second thoughts about Robert's eccentric ways of dealing the case.
3	3	"The Past"	Rajesh M. Selva	18 February 2022
Sivakumar dwells in torture in a dark and damp cellar. Robert takes a little detour to revisit a place that holds traumatic memories from the past. In Devi's timeline, she takes an unexpected decision that will forever change Swarna's life.
4	4	"The Suspect"	Rajesh M. Selva	18 February 2022
An international school in town, keeps catches Robert's attention in his investigation. Heera from the NGO becomes a primary suspect.
5	5	"Lost & Found"	Rajesh M. Selva	18 February 2022
A janitor from the school falls into the radar of Robert's suspects. Meanwhile, Sivakumar tries to execute his escape plan. In a mix-up of things, Robert ends up arriving alone to what could very well be the hideout of the kidnapper.
6	6	"Truth Will Set You Free"	Rajesh M. Selva	18 February 2022
Robert has a face-off with Sumithran. In astrange turn of events the other abductor surrenders to the police. As the case is being closed and normalcy returns, Robert is being lured to a door from the past.

== Release ==
Along with the original Tamil version, the series has also been released with dubbed version in Hindi & Marathi language titled as Kodai Diaries which is available to watch on Ultra Play & Ultra Jhakaas app respectively.
