= Frédéric Jardin =

French film director (born 1968)

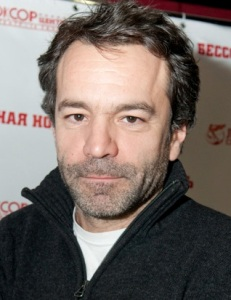
- Frédéric Jardin in January 2012
- Born: 18 May 1968 (age 58)
- Occupation: Film director
- Years active: 1990 - present
- Parent: Pascal Jardin
- Relatives: Alexandre Jardin (brother)

Frédéric Jardin (born 18 May 1968) is a French film director.

== Early life ==
Frédéric Jardin born May 24, 1968 in Neuilly-sur-Seine, Frédéric Jardin trained on set, becoming an assistant director and shooting short films in Super 8. He directed his first feature film in 1994, "La Folie douce," in which his friend Edouard Baer played a role.

== Filmography ==
Year	Title	Role	Notes
1990	Bienvenue à bord !	Assistant director	
1990	Aventure de Catherine C.	Assistant director	
1991	Germany Year 90 Nine Zero	Assistant director	
1992	Amoureuse	Assistant director	
1992	A Heart in Winter	Assistant director	
1993	Hélas pour moi	Assistant director	
1994	La folie douce	Director & writer	
1999	Chico, notre homme à Lisbonne	Actor	TV Short
2000	Les frères Soeur	Director & writer	
2002	Cravate club	Director & writer	
2003	Le grand plongeoir	Actor	TV mini-series
2004	À boire	Writer	
2005	Akoibon	Actor	
2007	Have Mercy on Us All	Actor	
2011	Sleepless Night	Director & writer	
2014	Braquo	Director	TV series (4 episodes)
2015	Thoongaavanam	Co-writer	story credit; Tamil remake of Sleepless Night
2014-19	Spiral	Director	TV series (18 episodes); Nominated - ACS Award for Best Director (2015); Nominated - ACS Award for Best Director (2018)
2016	À fond	Writer	
2017	Sleepless	co-writer	story credit; American remake of Sleepless Night
2021	Totems	Co-director	
2023	Bloody Daddy	co-writer	story credit; Hindi remake of Sleepless Night
TBA	Visceral	Director	Pre-Production
TBA	Nuit Blanche	Director	
2024	Survivre	Director	
