= Rajesh M. Selva =

Indian film director and screenwriter

- Born: 21 March 1981 (age 45); Tamil Nadu, India
- Education: Loyola College, Chennai M. C. C. Higher Secondary School, Chennai
- Occupations: Director, Screenwriter
- Children: 1

Rajesh M. Selva is an Indian film director and screenwriter, primarily working in Tamil cinema. Selva became a notable director with the Kamal Haasan starrer Thoongaa Vanam.

== Career ==
Rajesh began his career in entertainment by being a part of the band, Shenanigans, which was formed in 1999 alongside his school mates Naresh and Sathish Ramalingam at M. C. C. Higher Secondary School. He is a reputed corporate designer who did his visual design course with Mr. Jullius Mac Van. He also graduated a visual communications degree from St Thomas College in 2003 & did his Master's from Loyola College, Chennai in 2005 and continued to work on his music career, by recording songs at DesignSelva, a record company he founded in 2005. Alongside his band, he released the independent album She 16, in collaboration with Saregama, during October 2006. He subsequently went on to make a feature film with new technicians, titled Kaalaippani (2008), and shot for the project throughout 2007. Featuring Vasundhara and Nassar alongside several newcomers, Kaalaipani was a murder mystery film which had a low-key release.

In 2008, Rajesh decided to join Raaj Kamal Films International on the advice of his friend, director Sri Krishna. He subsequently joined Kamal Haasan for the pre-production works of Marmayogi and served as the film's third assistant director. He worked on gathering information to help script portions set in the 6th century and spent nearly forty-five days with the researchers at the archaeological department to know the scriptures of sixth century Tamil that existed in Pandiya kingdom. The film was shelved soon after but he continued to work with Raaj Kamal Films through the productions of both parts to Vishwaroopam (2013) and Uttama Villain (2015), playing cameo roles as an actor in both films.

After gaining offers to direct films in 2014 after the completion of Vishwaroopam II (2016), Rajesh left Kamal Haasan's team, but the films which were being planned failed to materialize. Kamal Haasan subsequently called him back to the company in April 2015 and requested that he direct the official remake of Sleepless Night (2011), which Raaj Kamal Films had purchased. Titled Thoongaa Vanam (2015) in Tamil and Cheekati Rajyam (2015) in Telugu, Rajesh completed both version of the film within sixty days of shoot. Featuring an ensemble cast headed by Kamal Haasan, he worked with the actor on adapting the original script into the Tamil and Telugu languages, and wrote in new characters to be played by Trisha and Madhu Shalini. Rajesh was also in charge of gathering and selecting the members of the cast and crew. The films opened in November 2015 to critical acclaim and had a good performance at the box office.

In 2019, he directed Kadaram Kondan starring Vikram, Akshara Haasan and Abi Hassan, which was a remake of the French film Point Blank. In 2022, Selva helmed Irai, a Tamil-language crime thriller series for Aha Tamil, starring R. Sarathkumar in the lead role and now Selva is directing Aditi Rao Hydari and Anson Paul in a Tamil-Telugu bi-lingual.

== Personal life ==
Rajesh Selva has a daughter born in 2016.

== Filmography ==
Year	Film	Notes			
Year	Film	Notes	2008	Kaalaippani	credited as Rajesh Selva
2015	Thoongaa Vanam	Simultaneously shot in Telugu as Cheekati Rajyam			
2019	Kadaram Kondan				
2022	Irai	TV series			
2025	The Game: You Never Play Alone	TV series			

As actor

Year	Film	Role	Notes				
Year	Film	Role	Notes	2013	Vishwaroopam	Terrorist	Also assistant director; Tamil-Hindi bilingual film
Vishwaroop				2013		Terrorist	Also assistant director; Tamil-Hindi bilingual film
2015	Uttama Villain	Spy					
2015	Thoongaa Vanam	Head Chef	Tamil-Telugu bilingual film				
2015	Cheekati Rajyam	Head Chef	Tamil-Telugu bilingual film				
