= Sleepless Night (2011 film) =

2011 French film by Frédéric Jardin

- Poster
- Directed by: Frédéric Jardin
- Written by: Frédéric Jardin; Nicolas Saada
- Produced by: Lauranne Bourachot; Marco Cherqui
- Starring: Tomer Sisley; Adel Bencherif; Julien Boisselier; Serge Riaboukine; Pom Klementieff
- Cinematography: Tom Stern
- Edited by: Christophe Pinel
- Music by: Nicolas Errèra
- Production companies: Chic Films; Motion Investment Group; Saga Film
- Distributed by: BAC Films
- Release date: November 16, 2011 (France)
- Running time: 103 minutes
- Countries: France; Belgium; Luxembourg
- Language: French
- Budget: $4.6 million
- Box office: $430,000

Sleepless Night (French: Nuit Blanche) is a 2011 French-language action thriller film directed by Frédéric Jardin, who co-wrote the story with Nicolas Saada. The film stars Tomer Sisley, Adel Bencherif, Julien Boisselier, Serge Riaboukine and Pom Klementieff.

Sleepless Night was premiered in 2011 at the Toronto International Film Festival and received positive reviews from critics.

== Premise ==
Detective Vincent plans to rob a pair of drug couriers where he manages to steal a bag of cocaine, only to learn that the cocaine is actually owned by nightclub owner and drug dealer Jose Marciano. Marciano kidnaps Vincent's son and demands to return the cocaine in exchange for his son's safety. After finalizing the deal, Vincent finds that his cocaine has vanished and sets out to form an alternate plan to save his son from Marciano.

== Cast ==
- Tomer Sisley as Vincent Downs
- Joeystarr as Feydeck
- Adel Bencherif as Abdel
- Julien Boisselier as Lacombe
- Samy Seghir as Thomas
- Lizzie Brocheré as Vignali
- Serge Riaboukine as Marciano
- Dominique Bettenfeld as Alex
- Pom Klementieff as Lucy

== Production ==
Actor Tomer Sisley took the role immediately after reading the script. Sisley performed all his own stunts in the film, stating "I think that it is always better for the movie because it allows him [Frédéric Jardin] to put the camera wherever he wants."

The dance club in the film was built for the film. As a requirement of being a joint Belgian-French-Luxembourgian production, the film had to be partially shot in these locations having the dance club scene shot in Belgium and the kitchen and parking scenes shot in Luxembourg. For the fight scene in the kitchen, director Jardin desired "a fight that would be interesting for people who don’t like fights in films. Not just for crazy people who like kung-fu movies." Sisley was familiar with martial arts and boxing and jujitsu worked on the choreography for the fight scene before having a location or the scene.

== Release ==
Sleepless Night premiered at the 2011 Toronto International Film Festival. It was also shown at the 2012 Tribeca Film Festival. In September 2011, Warner Bros. Studios bought the rights for an American remake. The film was released in France on November 11, 2011. The film was the 15th highest-grossing film in France on its opening week and grossed a total of $298,383.

Tribeca Film purchased the American rights to the film for theatrical and video-on-demand distribution.

== Reception ==
Sleepless Night was received positively by critics on its original release. The film ranking website Rotten Tomatoes reported that 97% of critics had given the film positive reviews, based upon a sample of 32 review with an average score of 7.53/10. At Metacritic, which assigns a normalized rating out of 100 to reviews from mainstream critics, the film has received an average score of 75, based on 11 reviews.

== Adaptations ==
Two remakes were announced in 2015, an American adaptation titled, Sleepless, starring Jamie Foxx and Michelle Monaghan with Swiss director, Baran bo Odar, attached to the project, and an Indian bilingual Tamil-Telugu adaptation titled Thoongaa Vanam / Cheekati Rajyam, starring Kamal Haasan directed by Rajesh M. Selva, a former assistant in the actor's directorial ventures.

The Hindi adaptation, Bloody Daddy, 2023 starring Shahid Kapoor, Sanjay Kapoor, Ronit Roy, and Diana Penty, directed by Ali Abbas Zafar was released on June 9, 2023.
