= Achcham Madam Naanam Payirppu =

2022 Indian film

- Official release poster
- Directed by: Raja Ramamurthy
- Written by: Raja Ramamurthy
- Starring: Akshara Haasan; Usha Uthup; Malgudi Subha
- Cinematography: Shreya Dev Dube
- Edited by: Keerthana Murali
- Music by: Susha
- Production company: Trendloud
- Distributed by: Amazon Prime Video
- Release date: 25 March 2022
- Country: India
- Language: Tamil

Achcham Madam Naanam Payirppu (transl. Fear, Innocence, Coyness, Chastity) is a 2022 Indian Tamil-language adult drama film written and directed by debutant Raja Ramamurthy and produced by Trendloud. The film stars Akshara Haasan, with Usha Uthup, Malgudi Subha, Anjana Jayaprakash, Suresh Chandra Menon and George Maryan in supporting roles. It was released via Amazon Prime Video on 25 March 2022.

== Plot ==
The story revolves around Pavithra, a quintessential 19-year-old from a conservative family whose world is small and monotonous. Her day begins with coffee, followed by Carnatic music classes from the legendary singer Charukesi and her grandmother, the matriarch. Pavithra's mother, Sowmya, is overbearing and invariably passes strong remarks about Pavithra's singing being subpar, and her father, Bhardwaj, has unrealistic expectations of her. Pavithra's secret boyfriend, Harish, a cricketer, and Bhardwaj's hatred for him is evident. Her two best friends, Jessica and Rathi, are the angel and devil on her shoulders. Despite being born into a conservative family, she secretly accustoms herself to non-vegetarian food, which puts her in a constant state of cognitive dissonance.

One day, an impromptu conversation about premarital sex pops up between the three friends, and both her friends stand divided on their opinion. Later that night, Pavithra wakes up from an erotic dream that triggers her sexual awakening. She discusses this with Rathi and Jessica, and she decides to do something about it.

Pavithra comes home to the news of a relative passing away and her parents having to attend it. It leaves Pavithra alone for the night at home, and she fancies having sex with Harish. Pavithra starts to give it serious thought, and after Rathi eggs her on and Jessica exclaims it is a sin, she eventually decides to give it a go and prepares for the night when Harish consents. Rathi stresses the importance of a condom and encourages her to buy one from the local grocery store, where Pavithra is a regular customer. The Annachi at the store, who regards Pavithra as a child, is shocked to see Pavithra ask for a condom. Jessica confronts Pavithra and Rathi outside the store, and Rathi leaves to pick up some sexy clothes for Pavithra.

On her return home, Satish, the guy who generally stalks her, affronts Pavithra. As Pavithra sneaks the condom box past Window Aunty, who keeps Pavithra's conscience in check with her occasional judging looks, she receives a call from Sowmya asking her to accompany Charukesi to the concert, which conflicts with her plans. Just then, Naidu Aunty unloads one of her MLM products on Pavithra and cites her poor singing skills, resulting in Pavithra's dwindling confidence depleting. With Pavithra already feeling like a letdown, when Rathi enters the house with new clothes, Pavithra impetuously slut shames her, and Rathi leaves the house. To add insult to injury, she receives a message from Harish that he will not be able to make it tonight, and her final nail in the coffin is the food poisoning she gets from the fish she had earlier in the day. She decides to call off her night altogether.

Later, hesitantly, Pavithra visits Charukesi to elucidate her absence from the concert and breaks down and pours her heart out to Charukesi, and they share a tender moment. On reaching home, Harish finally shows up with a valid excuse and pleads to be let in, and they eventually have sex. She wakes up the next day and realises that sex has not changed her. Nothing has affected Pavithra's character. She accepts that each person's perspective is different but not wrong.

== Cast ==
- Akshara Haasan as Pavithra
- Usha Uthup as Charukesi
- Malgudi Subha as Sowmya
- Anjana Jayaprakash as Rathi
- Shalini Vijayakumar as Jessica
- Janaki Sabesh as Naidu Aunty
- Kalairani as Window Aunty
- Suresh Chandra Menon as Baradwaj
- George Maryan as Manikandan
- Siddhartha Shankar as Harish
- Kiran Keshav as Satish

== Soundtrack ==
The songs and background score were composed by Susha and the lyrics by Madhan Karky

== Accolades ==
Achcham Madam Naanam Payirppu (The Myth of the Good Girl) had a very successful run at the International film festival circuit and was selected at prestigious festivals such as HBO's South Asian International Film Festival, Mosaic International South Asian Film Festival at Canada, Caleidoscope Indian Film Festival at Boston, Chicago South Asian Film Festival, Atlanta Indian Film Festival, and Tasveer South Asian Film Festival at Seattle.

== Reception ==
The movie was welcomed as new and refreshing and also encouraged as a daring attempt. Haricharan Pudipeddi of Hindustan Times wrote the film "is a refreshing adult comedy that doesn’t rely on lame sex jokes – like most adult comedies in Tamil cinema - to talk about a young girl’s sexual exploration. With a highly relatable story and situations that most of us would’ve experienced in our lives, the film works to a large extent, thanks to its lighthearted tone and treatment. The fact that the film presents the idea of losing one’s virginity as just another human desire makes this attempt laudable." Roktim Rajpal of Deccan Herald gave a rating of 2.5 out on 5 and wrote, "The film has a good concept but the writing could have been better." Soundarya Athimuthu of The Quint commends that the film “aims to be a responsible representation that highlights the importance of a sex positive culture through cinema and scores for its right intentions.” Ashameera Aiyappan of First Post writes that the movie ”is fascinating, mainly because we do not have many mainstream films that explore female desire” Thinkal Menon of OTTplay reviews the movie as “The genuine attempt to narrate a simple story effectively, thereby breaking the myth associated with good girl and bad girl in a progressive manner.” Vishal Menon of The Film Companion wrote that "Achcham Madam Naanum Payirppu, On Amazon Prime Video, Is A Gentle, Non-Judgemental Adult Comedy About The Big “First Time” that evolves into a mini rebellion.
