= Laali Ki Shaadi Mein Laaddoo Deewana =

2017 film written and directed by Manish Harishankar

- Official Poster
- Directed by: Manish Harishankar
- Written by: Manish Harishankar
- Produced by: TP Aggarwal; Rahul Aggarwal
- Starring: Vivaan Shah; Akshara Haasan; Gurmeet Choudhary; Kavitta Verma
- Cinematography: Ravi Yadav
- Edited by: Steven Bernard
- Music by: Songs; Vipin Patwa; Revant Siddharth; Arko; Malini Awasthi; Background Music; Rohit Kulkarni
- Production company: Star Entertainment Worldwide
- Distributed by: White Lion Entertainment
- Release date: 7 April 2017
- Running time: 130 minutes
- Country: India
- Language: Hindi
- Budget: ₹ 20 crore
- Box office: ₹8.1 million

Laali Ki Shaadi Mein Laaddoo Deewana (transl. Laaddoo, the crazy lover at Laali's wedding) is a 2017 Hindi-language, Indian romantic drama comedy film, written and directed by Manish Harishankar, and produced by TP Aggarwal and Rahul Aggarwal, Executive Producer Vishal Singh. The film stars Vivaan Shah, Akshara Haasan, Gurmeet Choudhary and Kavitta Verma in pivotal roles. The teaser posters for the film were released on 20 February 2017 while the trailer was launched on YouTube on 27 February 2017. The film released on 7 April 2017 to negative reviews from critics and audiences alike.

== Plot ==
Laddoo (Vivaan Shah) is a middle-class, ambitious young man from Lalitpur who dreams of becoming a successful entrepreneur like the Tatas and Birlas of India. After convincing his father, he moves to Vadodara, where he starts working as a waiter in his father's friend's cafe.

One day, he bumps into Laali (Akshara Haasan) at the cafe and immediately falls for her charm. Laali is a regular customer at Kabir's Cafe. Soon, they fall in love and become intimate. Laali discovers that she is pregnant with Laddoo's child and wants to keep the baby. However, Laddoo, intent upon chasing his dreams first, asks her to terminate the pregnancy. A desperate Laali approached Laddoo's parents, who are visiting him, and came clean to them about their situation. Laddoo's father is enraged and declares that a wedding must take place between the couple in the next 2 days. Laddoo argues and things escalate when Laddoo tells his parents that they are free to leave his house if they can't see his point of view. Laddoo's father renounces his relationship with his son and decides to informally adopt Laali and take responsibility for settling her and her unborn child.

As time passes, Laddoo's parents actively seek a suitable groom for a pregnant Laali. They are approached by a wealthy royal family from Rampur looking for a bride for their Prince Veer. Veer is a kind and open-minded man who agrees to accept Laali and her unborn child. Wedding preparations begin in full swing as Veer and Laali start to bond.

== Cast ==
- Akshara Haasan as Laali
- Vivaan Shah as Laddoo
- Gurmeet Choudhary as Prince Veer
- Kavitta Verma as Palak
- Saurabh Shukla as Laali's Father
- Sanjay Mishra as Kabir
- Darshan Jariwala as Laddoo's Father
- Ravi Kishan as A crooked corporate executive
- Suhasini Mulay as Veer's Grandmother
- Navni Parihar as Laddoo's Mother
- Kishori Shahane as Laali's Mother
- Jyoti Kalash as Kishor Kumar
- Ehshan Khan as Singh Ji

== Soundtrack ==
Laali Ki Shaadi Mein Laaddoo Deewana

Soundtrack album by Revant, Siddharth, Vipin Patwa & Arko
- Released: March 21, 2017
- Genre: Feature film soundtrack
- Length: 29:27
- Label: Zee Music Company
External audio
- Audio Jukebox on YouTube

Tracklist
No.	Title	Lyrics	Music	Singer(s)	Length
1.	"Laali Ki Shaadi"	Manish Harishankar	Revant & Siddharth	Sukhwinder Singh	03:45
2.	"Bezubaan"	Mahima Bhardwaj	Vipin Patwa	KK	04:48
3.	"Rishta"	Ghulam Mohd Khavar	Arko	Ankit Tiwari & Arko	04:27
4.	"Rog Jaane – Rahat Version"	Dr. Sagar	Vipin Patwa	Palak Muchhal & Rahat Fateh Ali Khan	04:12
5.	"Rog Jaane – Mohit Version"	Dr. Sagar	Vipin Patwa	Palak Muchchal & Mohit Lalwani	04:12
6.	"Mano Ya Na Mano"	Traditional	Revant & Siddharth	Malini Awasthi	03:51
7.	"Naino Ke Pokhar"	Dr. Sagar	Vipin Patwa	Mohd Irffan & Vipin Patwa	04:27
Total length:					29:27

== Critical reception ==
Nihit Bhave of The Times of India gave the film a rating of 1.5 out of 5 and said that, "Akshara and Vivaan deliver embarrassingly over-the-top performances. The film is structured so that you connect all the dots within half an hour and are then left with a whole lot nothing to look forward to." Sreehari Nair of Rediff gave the film a rating of 1.5 out of 5 and said that, "Laali Ki Shaadi Mein Laaddoo Deewana is insipid, terribly made, and yet a Warm Enterprise". Saibal Chatterjee of NDTV gave the film a rating of 1.5 out of 5 saying that, "Akshara Haasan's film is a tedious rom-com that fails to shrug off its loopy quality despite a few entertaining performances". Mohar Basu of Mid-Day gave the film a rating of 1 out of 5 and said that, "Director Manish Ravishankar wanted to give us a Rajshri-styled dramedy with a Kya Kehna twist. But it's boring, unfunny and utterly ridiculous. If you survive the first hour, you might just get a gallantry award."
