= Inimey Ippadithan =

2015 Indian film by Muruganand

- Poster
- Directed by: Muruganand
- Written by: Muruganand
- Produced by: Santhanam
- Starring: Santhanam; Akhila Kishore; Ashna Zaveri
- Cinematography: Gopi Jagadeeswaran
- Edited by: Ruben
- Music by: Santhosh Dhayanidhi
- Production company: Handmade Films
- Distributed by: Red Giant Movies
- Release date: 12 June 2015
- Running time: 134 minutes
- Country: India
- Language: Tamil

Inimey Ippadithan (transl. Hereafter, it will be like this from) is a 2015 Indian Tamil language romantic comedy film written and directed by the duo Muruganand (Murugan and Prem Anand) of Lollu Sabha fame. Santhanam, who also produced the film, plays the lead role in it, alongside Ashna Zaveri and Akhila Kishore. The film opened to positive reviews and became a commercial hit.

== Plot ==
Seenu is a happy-go-lucky guy. His parents Ekambaram and Bhavani search for a bride to get him married within three months as per an astrologer's advice. Seenu does not believe in arranged marriages and tries to woo girls around him. Eventually, he falls in love with Maha, but she does not reciprocate. Meanwhile, Seenu's wedding is fixed with Akhila by his parents. Seenu finds out that Maha also loves him and decides to cancel his wedding with Akhila with the help of his maternal uncle Ulaganathan. One day, Seenu calls Akhila to inform her about his love for Maha. Coincidentally, it was Akhila's birthday, and he prefers not to disappoint her. Maha spots Seenu with Akhila and understands the truth. She also informs this to Akhila. Maha breaks up with Seenu. Akhila forgives Seenu and prefers the wedding to proceed as planned. On the day of the wedding, Seenu gets a call from Maha, asking him to marry her in a register office or else she would commit suicide. Seenu rushes to the register office to save Maha but gets shocked seeing her wedding with her cousin. Seenu understands that it was a prank played by Maha to revenge him. Seenu rushes back to his wedding hall to marry Akhila, but Akhila married her family friend as everyone believed that Seenu eloped with Maha. Seenu's parents worry thinking about his situation, but Ulaganathan gets his daughter married to Seenu.

== Cast ==
- Santhanam as Seenu
- Akhila Kishore as Akhila
- Ashna Zaveri as Maha
- Thambi Ramaiah as Ulaganathan, Seenu's uncle
- VTV Ganesh as Chandra, Seenu's friend
- Aadukalam Naren as Ekambaram, Seenu's father
- Pragathi as Bhavani, Seenu's mother
- FEFSI Vijayan as Major Chandrakanth, Akhila's father
- Sriranjani as Akhila's mother
- Vidyullekha Raman as Seenu's cousin and later Seenu's wife
- Jagan as Seenu
- Aryan as Ravi
- Sendrayan as Tarun
- Abhishek Vinod as Karthik
- Karunakaran as Ganesan
- Narayan Lucky as Avinash
- Singampuli as Mottai
- Lollu Sabha Manohar as Kunjithapadham
- Komal Sharma as Smita
- Ganja Karuppu as Gnanamuthu
- Sethu as Sethu, Seenu's friend
- Lollu Sabha Antony as Antony, Seenu's friend
- Gokul as Gokul, Seenu's friend
- Niranjini Agarwal as Niranjini, Maha's friend
- Gayathri Raj as Gayathri, Maha's friend and villain
- Krithika Laddu as Krithika, Maha's friend
- Cool Suresh as Michael
- Singamuthu as Politician
- Nippun
- Narayan
- Kalyanamalai Mohan as himself
- Dr. Arun Chinniah as himself
- Divya Krishnan as Samayal Manthiram Divya

== Soundtrack ==
Inimey Ippadithaan

Soundtrack album Inimey Ippadithaan by Santhosh Dhayanidhi
- Released: 10 May 2015
- Recorded: 2015
- Genre: Feature film soundtrack
- Length: 19:57
- Language: Tamil
- Label: Sony Music India

Santhosh Dhayanidhi chronology
Inimey Ippadithaan (2015)	Mo (2016)

Inimey Ippadithaan's music was composed by Santhosh Dhayanidhi, an assistant of A. R. Rahman. The lyrics of the songs were written by Gana Bala, Sofia Ashraf, Kabilan, Madhan Karky, Dr Uma Devi and Gana Vinoth. The soundtrack, released on 10 May 2015, received positive reviews.

No	Title	Singer(s)	Lyric(s)	Length
1	"Paartha Oru Lookula"	Gana Bala	Gana Bala	3:51
2	"Athana Azhagayum"	Varun Parandhaman, Sofia Ashraf	Kabilan, Sofia Ashraf	3:21
3	"Thaedi Odunaen"	Santhosh Dhayanidhi, Aalap Raju	Kabilan	2:12
4	"Innimey Ippadithaan"	Karthik, C. Aishvarrya Suresh	Madhan Karky	2:56
5	"Azhaga Aanazhaga"	Harini	Dr Uma Devi	3:31
6	"Aathula Oru Kaal"	Mahalingam, Thalapathi, Sapta	Gana Vinoth	4:06

== Release and reception ==
The film was released on 12 June 2015. The New Indian Express wrote, "The screenplay is neatly crafted, the narration has a smooth flow. The dialogue sparkles with wit, the humour decent...The film delivers much more than what one would have expected and is a pleasant watch". Sify wrote, "The storyline and structure is similar to any other Tamil film in the rom com genre. However, what makes it different is its treatment...Murugan-Anand's idea of making a comic entertainer with an important message is laudable" and described the film as an "enjoyable ride". The Hindu wrote, "The story isn't great but who cares when as many jokes are laugh-out-loud great as they are in Inimey...when there are as many jokes, there are also bound to be discomfiting ones...But in one of the more surprising final acts I’ve seen this year, Inimey quite redeems itself". Baradwaj Rangan called it a "not-bad, Bhagyaraj-style comedy", further writing, "when we go to these movies, the question isn’t “How politically correct is it?” but “Are there laughs?” And there are plenty...the film takes too long to get going. But once Cheenu finds himself trapped between his two women – a classic Bhagyaraj situation – we experience the gamut from hmmm... okay to hey, not bad to that was actually hilarious". The Times of India gave the film 3 stars out of 5 and wrote, "Comedy is still his (Santhanam's) biggest weapon and the actor is in sparkling form in this film, which is structured to his strengths. We get the quintessential Santhanam similes, which hit their mark quite often, though there is a fair share of ridicule disguised as humour". In contrast, Rediff gave 2 stars out of 5 and called it a "poorly-written, uninspiring romantic comedy", going on to add, "The film let down by a poorly-written script and the director's lacklustre execution. The extremely slow pace, the pretentious characters, ordinary background score, songs every 20 minutes, and a screenplay stuck on a single notion, makes director Muruganand's Inimey Ippadithaan one dimensional and monotonous".
