= C. Aishvarrya Suresh =

Indian model, singer and actress

Aishvarrya
- Born: 22 December 1988 (age 37); Chennai, Tamil Nadu
- Occupations: Model, singer
- Years active: 1997-present

Aishvarrya Suresh (22 December 1988) is an Indian model, singer and actress. She has worked for many fashion designers and appeared in over 600 different marketing campaigns.

Aishvarrya's first assignment was with Sharad Haksar. She later worked with fashion designers Satya Paul, Tarun Tahliani, Ritu Kumar, Ashish Soni, Rehane Yavar Dhala and others. She has also appeared in and on the cover of numerous national fashion magazines.

Aishvarrya is part of the Chennai-based fusion band Staccato. The band was selected by director Danny Boyle to perform at the 2012 Summer Olympics in London. Since 2015, she has been singing playback for Tamil films as well. She first sung Inimey Ippadithaan's title track composed by Santhosh Kumar Dayanidhi and later the Ghibran-composed song "Neeye Unakku Raja" alongside Kamal Haasan for Thoongavanam as well as its Telugu version for Cheekati Rajyam.

She played Roxie Hart in Chicago, based on the same-titled musical, which was jointly produced by actors Vishal and Varalaxmi Sarathkumar. In 2015, she acted in a stage adaptation of Baz Luhrmann's Moulin Rouge!, portraying the star courtesan, Satine, of the cabaret.
