= Sofia Ashraf =

Indian rapper and singer

Sofia Ashraf (born 1987) is an Indian rapper and singer. Her songs address the negligence of corporations that fail to clean up industrial disasters. Her 2008 song Don't Work for Dow criticizes Dow's failure to compensate victims of the 1984 Bhopal gas tragedy in India. In 2015, she released Kodaikanal Won't, a music video addressing mercury pollution in Kodaikanal from a thermometer factory owned by Unilever, a multinational consumer goods company.

In June 2016, she released "Dow vs. Bhopal: a Toxic Rap Battle".

== Early life ==
In 1987, Sofia Ashraf was born and brought up in an orthodox Malayali Muslim household in Chennai, Tamil Nadu. Sofia was part of a Muslim youth group in Chennai, and studied Islamic History and Philosophy ardently. She studied graphic design in Stella Maris College, Chennai, where she used to zealously participate in extracurricular activities. She began rapping on stage during a college festival, where she donned a Hijab and rapped to her own lyrics in which she questioned the people's attitude towards Muslims after September 11 attacks. The press referred to her as "The Burqa Rapper" after the incident. Despite this she now identifies as atheist and has several tattoos.

== Career ==
Ashraf worked as a creative supervisor for Ogilvy & Mather, a global advertising firm that counts Unilever as one of its clients. She quit the firm in 2015, a few months before making the hit single "Kodaikanal Won't". O&M executive chairman Piyush Pandey said the firm had wanted Ashraf to stay on, but that she left to pursue a new career path in 2015.

In 2008, she sang "Don't Work for Dow" while wearing a hijab to criticize Dow for its response to the Bhopal disaster in 1984.

In July 2015, she released the single "Kodaikanal Won't" to protest the pollution of a river in Kodaikanal. In the song she appeals to Unilever to help former workers in Kodaikanal, whose river was contaminated 14 years before with mercury from a thermometer plant owned by Unilever. Ashraf released a YouTube video of the song to campaign against the mercury poisoning. Ashraf used the Nicki Minaj tune "Anaconda" as the beat for "Kodaikanal Won't." In 2015, she collaborated with Chennai-based singer Maalavika Manoj and Sapta on the song Deen. The song was written by Ashraf to combat moral policing and insist the faith must be a choice, not an imposition.

Ashraf has recorded a song each in the Bollywood movie Jab Tak Hai Jaan and the Tamil movie Maryan (film), for music director A. R. Rahman, and also for Santhosh Kumar in his Tamil film Inimey Ippadithan.
