= Sleepless (2017 film) =

2017 film by Baran bo Odar

- Theatrical release poster
- Directed by: Baran bo Odar
- Screenplay by: Andrea Berloff
- Based on: Sleepless Night by: Frédéric Jardin; Nicolas Saada; Olivier Douyère
- Produced by: Roy Lee; Adam Stone
- Starring: Jamie Foxx; Michelle Monaghan; Dermot Mulroney; David Harbour; T.I.; Gabrielle Union; Scoot McNairy
- Cinematography: Mihai Mălaimare Jr.
- Edited by: Robert Rzesacz
- Music by: Michael Kamm
- Production companies: Riverstone Pictures; Vertigo Entertainment
- Distributed by: Open Road Films
- Release date: January 13, 2017
- Running time: 95 minutes
- Country: United States
- Language: English
- Budget: $30 million
- Box office: $32.9 million

Sleepless is a 2017 American action thriller film directed by Baran bo Odar and written by Andrea Berloff. A remake of the 2011 French film Sleepless Night, the film stars Jamie Foxx as a police officer who faces off against mobsters to rescue his son, whom they kidnapped. Michelle Monaghan, Dermot Mulroney, David Harbour, T.I., Gabrielle Union, and Scoot McNairy also star.

This film was released in the United States on January 13, 2017, by Open Road Films. It received generally negative reviews from critics. The film grossed $33 million against a budget of $30 million.

== Plot ==
In Las Vegas, LVMPD policemen Vincent Downs and his partner Sean Cass rob a shipment of cocaine belonging to entrepreneur Stanley Rubino, who intended to sell it to mobster Rob Novak, the son of a powerful mob boss. The two cops volunteer to investigate the robbery in order to cover up their involvement, clashing with Internal Affairs investigators Jennifer Bryant and her superior Doug Dennison, who are suspicious of the pair. Vincent is estranged from his wife Dena, who is getting remarried, and has minimal involvement in the life of his 16-year-old son T.

While driving T to a soccer game, Vincent is ambushed by Rubino's men, who stab him in the abdomen and kidnap his son – demanding the stolen cocaine back in exchange for T's life. Vincent retrieves the cocaine from Cass, places it in a duffel bag, and leaves it in the ventilation shaft of one of the bathrooms in Rubino's casino, hoping he can negotiate his son's release before handing over his leverage. He is unknowingly followed by Bryant, who, now convinced he is a dirty cop, retrieves the bag and hides it in the women's locker room nearby.

Without the drugs, Vincent is forced to present Rubino with bags of sugar to ensure T's safety, but Novak uncovers his ruse, and T is recaptured by Rubino's men, while Vincent manages to escape. Meanwhile, after coming up empty while searching the casino for Vincent, Dennison is convinced he's gotten away and directs Bryant to go home and get some sleep. Bryant gives him the key to the women's locker with the cocaine and heads for the exit.

Vincent enters the casino as a janitor, but crosses paths with Bryant on her way out and is chased into one of the hotel rooms. They fight, and he subdues her before revealing he's been undercover on behalf of Internal Affairs for the last two years to dismantle the crime ring within the police department. He knows Cass is a drug-runner, knew details about a previous investigation by Bryant, and is now attempting to find the senior member of law enforcement that is covering everything up.

A skeptical Bryant directs him to the locker room to retrieve the cocaine, but the drugs have recently been removed by Dennison. Dennison ambushes Vincent but is ultimately overpowered and knocked unconscious. Meanwhile, T escapes and steals Rubino's cellphone to contact Vincent, but is quietly being followed by Rubino and his men who allow it all to happen in an attempt to lure Vincent into a trap. Elsewhere, Dena finds out Vincent and T are in danger and heads to the casino.

Cass arrives and confronts Vincent about his Internal Affairs involvement, but then saves Vincent from one of Novak's men. He is shot in the process and presumed dead. Vincent infiltrates the casino in a police uniform that Cass brought and finds out Dennison is the mole in the force upon going through Cass's phone. Dennison is on Novak's payroll and ordered Cass to kill Vincent after informing him that he was Internal Affairs.

Bryant and Dennison later find a severely injured Cass in the garage. While Bryant checks the vitals of Novak's man, Dennison privately questions Cass on whether Vincent is aware of his involvement and finishes him off when Cass refuses to answer. Vincent and T reunite just as Novak begins shooting up the casino and escape to the parking garage. In the ensuing shootout, Bryant arrests Rubino.

Vincent and T attempt to escape in a stolen car, but are ambushed by Novak and his men, leading to a violent shootout. Dena arrives and kills Novak's remaining henchman to save Vincent and T before Novak corners them. He shoots Vincent in the chest, but Vincent survives and fatally shoots Novak. Vincent then contacts Bryant and alerts her of Dennison's corruption. She instantly attempts to apprehend Dennison but he shoots her. He then kills Rubino after questioning if Novak's father ever mentioned him in his criminal dealings, then shoots dead the policeman driving the cruiser they are in, in order to cause the vehicle to crash, intending to frame Rubino for the incident. However, Bryant survives and exposes Dennison, who is promptly arrested.

Vincent and Bryant are taken to the same hospital, where they make amends and congratulate each other on the job. Meanwhile, a corrupt DEA agent – seen earlier in the film – contacts Novak's father and informs him that there has been a problem, implying that he will subsequently tell him about his son's death.

== Cast ==
- Jamie Foxx as Vincent Downs
- Michelle Monaghan as Jennifer Bryant
- Scoot McNairy as Rob Novak
- Dermot Mulroney as Stanley Rubino
- T.I. (credited as Cliff “T.I.” Harris) as Sean Cass
- David Harbour as Doug Dennison
- Gabrielle Union as Dena Smith
- Octavius J. Johnson as Thomas Downs
- Tim Connolly as McFerrin
- Drew Sheer as Anderson
- Salah Barker as Benik
- Tim Rigby as Larry
- Mark Hamill as Bathroom Attendant
- Steve Coulter as Frazzled Concierge
- Chelsea Hayes as Shari
- Holly Morris as Kelly Rubino

== Production ==
Filming began on June 15, 2015, in Atlanta and Las Vegas.

== Release ==
The film was released in the United States by Open Road Films on January 13, 2017. It was originally set to be released on February 24, 2017, but in October 2016 was moved up to January.

=== Box office ===
Sleepless grossed $20.8 million in the United States and Canada and $12.1 million in other territories, for a worldwide total of $32.9 million.

In North America, the film was released alongside Monster Trucks and The Bye Bye Man, as well as the wide releases of Silence, Patriots Day and Live by Night, and was expected to gross around $10 million from 1,803 theaters in its opening weekend. It ended up opening to $8.4 million, finishing 8th at the box office. The film grossed $3.5 million of wide release (a drop of 59%), falling to 9th.

=== Critical response ===
On Rotten Tomatoes, the film has an approval rating of 25% based on 61 reviews and an average rating of 4.3/10. The site's critical consensus reads, "Sleepless wastes a talented cast – and solid source material – on a tired crime drama whose clichés rapidly outnumber its thrills." On Metacritic, the film has a weighted average score 34 out of 100 based on 15 critics, indicating "generally unfavorable reviews". Audiences polled by CinemaScore gave the film an average grade of "B+" on an A+ to F scale, while PostTrak reported filmgoers gave it a 77% overall positive score.

== See also ==
- List of films set in Las Vegas
