= Mentega Terbang =

- The poster
- Directed by: Khairi Anwar
- Written by: Khairi Anwar; Arjun Thanaraju; Visshnu Varman; Ti Teng-Hui
- Produced by: Tan Meng Kheng; Cassandra Lew
- Starring: Syumaila Salihin; Firdaus Karim; Nik Waheeda; Arjun Thanaraju; Shyamala Kandapper; Jesebel Lee; Khairunazwan Rodzy
- Cinematography: Sidney Chan
- Edited by: Sidney Chan
- Music by: Viona Palencia; Christian Palencia
- Production companies: Anomalist Production; Meng Kheng Entertainment
- Release date: 28 November 2021
- Running time: 104 minutes
- Country: Malaysia
- Language: Malay

Mentega Terbang is a 2021 Malaysian independent film directed by Khairi Anwar. This film was first screened on 28 November 2021 at the 2021 Jogja-NETPAC Asian Film Festival, and was previously available for streaming on Viu. This film tells the story of the religious conflict of a Muslim teenager, Aisyah, who delves into the theology of other major religions, especially the question of life after death.

The film was banned for hurting the religious feelings and the director and producer were charged under criminal provisions, and is currently unavailable for screening or streaming.

== Plot ==
Muslim teenager Aisyah, whose mother is a cancer patient near death and her father is a religious liberal, struggles to come to terms with her mother's imminent death. The family allow and encourage her to explore various religions and reads other religious texts, including the Quran, the Bible and the Vedas. This led to Aisyah being interested in the concept of reincarnation – being reborn as another being after death, in the hope of prolonging their time together. She decides that her mother must have been a butterfly in a past life because of her beauty, love of daylight, and colourful nature. Aisyah learns about Hinduism and Buddhism from her friend Suresh, and Christianity from their family friend Auntie Esthie, who converted from Hinduism as a young adult. Aiysah is surprised to learn that Auntie Esthie is a convert, who believed that like Aisyah, must follow the religion she was born into. Aiysah's interest in other religions, and associations with non-Malays, gains the attention and condemnation from their conservative neighbor.

After Aisyah's mother dies, her father tells her that she should use this time of her life to explore other beliefs and that she may freely chose whichever feels right to her. At her mother's grave, Aisyah sees a butterfly landing on the headstone.

== Release ==
Mentega Terbang was screened on 28 November 2021 behind closed doors in selected locations around the city of Kuala Lumpur.

== Reception ==
The film received mixed responses; some praised the bravery in using such a controversial topic, and compared it to similar films by Yasmin Ahmad. Meanwhile, some Muslim Malaysians are against the scenes where Aisyah questions Islamic laws, and her father's liberal character.

The film received mixed reviews from film critics. Ellyna Ali from Getaran portal described this film as a work "full of courage" while arguing that "watching Mentega Terbang seems to take us back to the initial process when we try to know life, know God, strengthen faith and try to understand the truth of religion itself".

=== Ban ===
The director and co-scriptwriter Mohamad Khairianwar Jailani, and the producer Tan Meng Kheng were charged with wounding the religious feelings of others. They pleaded not guilty to those charges. Khairi Anwar also received death threats.

The film was removed from Viu on 27 February 2023 and is currently unavailable.
