= Akshara Haasan =

Indian actress (born 1991)

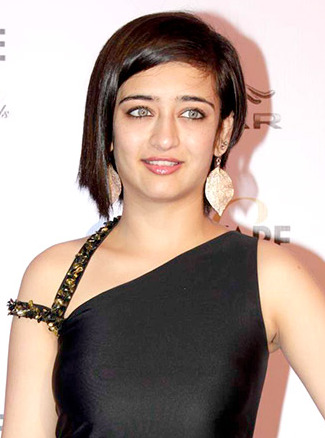
- Haasan at Filmfare Glamour & Style Awards in 2015
- Born: 12 October 1991 (age 35); Madras, (now Chennai), Tamil Nadu, India
- Occupations: Actress, singer
- Years active: 2010; 2015–2023
- Parent(s): Kamal Haasan; Sarika Thakur
- Family: See Haasan family

Akshara Haasan (born 12 October 1991) is an Indian actress who has appeared in Tamil and Hindi-language films. The daughter of actors Kamal Haasan and Sarika Thakur, and the younger sister of Shruti Haasan, she made her film debut with the comedy drama Shamitabh (2015), and later appeared in Kadaram Kondan (2019).

== Early life and family ==
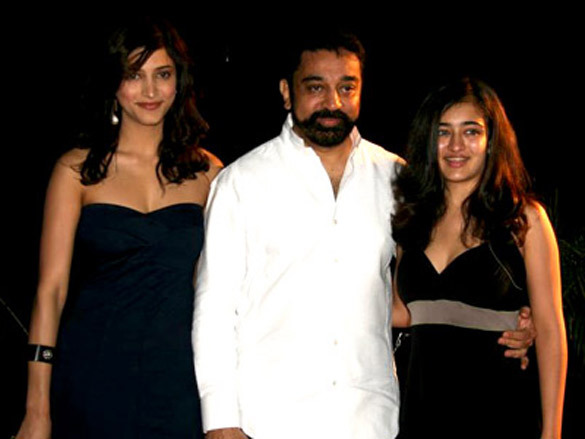
Haasan with her father Kamal Haasan & sister Shruti Haasan at the Indian premiere of Alice in Wonderland in 2010

Akshara Haasan was born in Madras (present-day Chennai), Tamil Nadu to actors Kamal Haasan and Sarika Thakur. Shruti Haasan is her elder sister. Akshara did her schooling from Abacus Montessori School, Montessori; Lady Andal in Chennai; Beacon High in Mumbai and completed her schooling in Indus International School, Bangalore.

== Personal life ==
Akshara Haasan resides in Mumbai alongside her mother. She has embraced Buddhism after previously identifying as an atheist, as revealed in an interview. Akshara was captivated by Buddhism, leading to her conversion.

== Career ==
Haasan has worked as an assistant director to Rahul Dholakia on the 2010 film Society, starring her mother Sarika, as well as Ram Moorthy, Uzer Khan, E. Niwas and Ruchi Narain on my many AD films in Mumbai. During her stint as an assistant director, she rejected opportunities to feature as an actress, notably turning down an offer to work in Mani Ratnam's Kadal. She also worked for her father's unreleased film, Sabaash Naidu, which had her sister Shruthi Haasan in a supporting role.

Haasan made her debut as an actress in Hindi film Shamitabh (2015), opposite Dhanush, which also has Amitabh Bachchan in the lead In Tamil, she costarred in Vivegam (2017). Kamal Haasan produced a movie with Vikram and Akshara Haasan in the lead roles which has been titled Kadaram Kondan (2019). Then, she playing a timid teenager in Achcham Madam Naanam Payirppu (2022).

== Filmography ==
=== Film ===
Year	Title	Role	Language	Notes	Ref.
2015	Shamitabh	Akshara Pandey	Hindi	Debut film	
2017	Laali Ki Shaadi Mein Laaddoo Deewana	Laali	Hindi		
2017	Vivegam	Natasha	Tamil		
2019	Kadaram Kondan	Aadhira	Tamil		
2022	Achcham Madam Naanam Payirppu	Pavithra	Tamil		
2026	Simulacra	Nivi	Hindi		
TBA	Agni Siragugal	Viji	Tamil	Unreleased Film	

=== Television ===
Year	Title	Role	Language	Network	Notes	Ref.
2019	Fingertip	Priya	Tamil	Zee5		
