= Thoongaavanam =

2015 Indian film by Rajesh M. Selva

- Theatrical release poster in Tamil
- Directed by: Rajesh M. Selva
- Screenplay by: Kamal Haasan
- Based on: Sleepless Night by Frédéric Jardin
- Produced by: Kamal Haasan; Chandrahasan; Gokulam Gopalan
- Starring: Kamal Haasan; Prakash Raj; Trisha Krishnan; Kishore; Sampath Raj
- Cinematography: Sanu Varghese
- Edited by: Shan Mohammed
- Music by: M. Ghibran
- Production companies: Raaj Kamal Films International; Sree Gokulam Movies
- Distributed by: Escape Artists Motion Pictures
- Release dates: 10 November 2015 (Tamil); 20 November 2015 (Telugu)
- Running time: 127 minutes
- Country: India
- Languages: Tamil; Telugu
- Box office: est. ₹50 crore

Thoongaavanam (transl. Sleepless forest) is a 2015 Indian action thriller film directed by Rajesh M. Selva. The film stars an ensemble cast including Kamal Haasan, Prakash Raj, Trisha Krishnan, Kishore, Sampath Raj, Guru Somasundaram, Yugi Sethu, Aman Abdullah, Asha Sharath, Madhu Shalini and Jagan. It was filmed simultaneously in Tamil and Telugu languages, the latter titled Cheekati Rajyam (transl. Kingdom of darkness). Both versions were produced by Raaj Kamal Films International and Sree Gokulam Movies. The film is a remake of the French film Sleepless Night (2011). Thoongaavanam was released on 10 November 2015 coinciding with Diwali while Cheekati Rajyam was released ten days later, on 20 November.

== Plot ==
C. K. Diwakar is an Indian Revenue Service (IRS) officer in the Narcotics Control Bureau (NCB), who along with his deputy Mani, steals a narcotics shipment but gets stabbed in the process. In retaliation, Vittal Rao, a drug lord, who was due to receive the shipment, kidnaps Diwakar's son Vasu. He is willing to release Vasu if Diwakar can return to him the bag of cocaine that he stole earlier. With no other option at hand, Diwakar agrees and proceeds to Vittal's nightclub, with the bag of cocaine, where Vasu is held hostage. His act of hiding the bag in the men's toilet is noticed by NCB agent Mallika, who becomes suspicious. Thinking that Diwakar is involved in drug smuggling, she informs her superior Dhiraviyam / Mohan.

Dhiraviyam / Mohan begin to pursue Diwakar, taking away the bag of cocaine from the toilet in the process. When Diwakar realises that the bag of cocaine has gone missing, he decides to return to Vittal a bag containing packets of milk powder instead, thinking that he and his cronies, including a gangster named Pedha Babu, will not realise the difference. Unfortunately, Vittal and Pedha soon find out that Diwakar had cheated them and decide to kill him. Diwakar's wound gets worse and starts bleeding. Caught between Vittal's gang on one side and Mallika and Dhiraviyam / Mohan on the other side, Diwakar confronts Mallika and tells her that contrary to her suspicions, he has been working undercover and had planned the entire operation to expose cops such as Dhiraviyam / Mohan and Mani, who are involved in drug smuggling.

Diwakar then rescues Vasu without Vittal's knowledge, and Vittal is also arrested by Mallika and Dhiraviyam / Mohan. While taking Vittal to prison, Mallika finds out that she has Mani's mobile phone, and on reading the messages in it, she finds out that Diwakar had been speaking the truth all along, realising that Dhiraviyam / Mohan and Mani are involved in drug smuggling and had tried to frame Diwakar. Though Dhiraviyam tries to resist arrest, killing Vittal in the process, he is eventually brought to justice. Diwakar falls unconscious due to the constant bleeding of his wound and Vasu takes him to the hospital. Diwakar recovers. Three months later, Mallika is now Diwakar's deputy, and the duo is shown thwarting the attempted murder of a police officer.

== Cast ==
Adapted from the closing credits (Note: The closing credits mention several character names that are not used in the narrative including Duraipandian, Maheswari, Jagan, Mandhiramoorthy and Gelusil Babu.)

- Kamal Haasan as C. K. Diwakar
- Prakash Raj as Vittal Rao
- Trisha as Mallika
- Kishore as Dhiraviyam (Tamil) / Mohan (Telugu)
- Sampath Raj as Pedha Babu
- Yugi Sethu as T. I. Mani
- Asha Sharath as Dr. Sujatha
- Aman Abdullah as Vasu
- Madhu Shalini as Esther
- Guru Somasundaram as Vittal Rao's assistant
- Santhana Bharathi as Thandapani (Tamil)
- Ramajogayya Sastry as Subba Rao (Telugu)
- Uma Riyaz Khan as the bartender
- Jagan as Vittal Rao's gang member
- Chaams as a busboy
- Rajesh M. Selva as the head chef
- Suka (Tamil) / Abburi Ravi (Telugu) as another drunkard

== Production ==
=== Development ===
In April 2015, it was announced that Kamal Haasan's next project would be an action thriller, tentatively titled Ore Iravu, and directed by his former assistant Rajesh M. Selva. By the following month, the film was officially titled Thoongaavanam. Haasan added that the film would be shot simultaneously and with the same cast and crew in Telugu as Cheekati Rajyam. The film was produced by Raaj Kamal Films International in association with Sree Gokulam Movies. Sanu Varghese and Shan Mohammed serve as the cinematographer and editor, respectively, while Ghibran was recruited as the music composer, working on his fourth successive Haasan film. Suka was chosen to write the Tamil dialogues, while Abburi Ravi was assigned to work on the dialogues for the Telugu version besides making a cameo.

=== Casting ===
Haasan was reported to be play an Indian Revenue Service officer in the Narcotics Control Bureau. Trisha and Prakash Raj were the first actors to be cast and reported to play the female lead and an important supporting role respectively. This film marks Trisha's 50th film and completes her 15 years in the industry. While Prakash Raj was said to portray a drug dealer, Trisha's role was said to be a police officer. In June 2015, Asha Sharath, was announced as part of the cast. Uma Riyaz Khan appeared in an "important role", reuniting with Haasan after Anbe Sivam (2003), and Kishore informed that he would play a "key role". In June 2015, it was reported that Madhu Shalini was part of the film and had starting filming, while Sampath Raj was also added to the cast. Aman Abdullah played Haasan's son, making his acting debut.

=== Filming ===
Principal photography began in late May at Ramoji Film City in Hyderabad, and was completed in 38 working days by early August 2015. Since the film is a Tamil-Telugu bilingual, scenes involving Tamil Nadu Police uniforms and vehicle nameplates were reshot for the Telugu version to include Andhra Pradesh police uniform and vehicle nameplates to avoid localisation issues.

== Soundtrack ==
Thoongaavanam

Soundtrack album by Ghibran
- Released: 7 October 2015 (Tamil); 3 November 2015 (Telugu)
- Recorded: 2015
- Genre: Feature film soundtrack
- Length: 4:33
- Languages: Tamil; Telugu
- Label: Think Music
- Producer: Ghibran

Ghibran chronology
Papanasam (2015)	Thoongaavanam (2015)	Babu Bangaram (2016)
External audio
- Official Video Song (Tamil) on YouTube
- Official Video Song (Telugu) on YouTube

The soundtrack album for Thoongaavanam composed by Ghibran, features only one song, "Neeye Unakku Raja". The metal song, written by Vairamuthu and sung by Kamal Haasan, with backing vocals by Yazin Nizar and model-turned-singer Aishvarrya, was released on 7 October 2015. The Telugu version, "Cheekati Raajyam", was written by Ramajogayya Sastry, who also made a cameo in the film, and was released on 3 November.

Track listing (Tamil)
No.	Title	Lyrics	Singer(s)	Length
1.	"Neeye Unakku Raja"	Vairamuthu	Kamal Haasan, Aishvarrya, Yazin Nizar	4:33

Track listing (Telugu)
No.	Title	Lyrics	Singer(s)	Length
1.	"Cheekati Raajyam"	Ramajogayya Sastry	Kamal Haasan, Aishvarrya, Yazin Nizar	4:32

== Release ==
Thoongaavanam was released on 10 November 2015, coinciding with Diwali, and Cheekati Rajyam ten days later, on 20 November. AZIndia.com, then an up-and-coming distribution company, acquired the theatrical rights for both versions in the United States, with a premiere planned for Thoongaavanam on 9 November. Escape Artists Motion Pictures distributed the film in Tamil Nadu. Cheekati Rajyam premiered on 19 November.

== Reception ==
=== Thoongaavanam ===
Gautaman Bhaskaran of Hindustan Times gave the film a rating of 4/5 stars, calling it "an absolute slick crime adventure". Latha Srinivasan of Daily News and Analysis gave 3.5/5 stars mentioning Thoongaa Vanam as a slick, well-made film that takes you through the course of happening over one night to the police officer and appreciated Rajesh Selva for directing a film that broke from the regular Tamil films. They also appreciated the performance of Kamal Haasan, Trisha and Ghibran for the excellent background score.

Rating it 3/5 stars, S. Saraswathi of Rediff.com appreciated the performances of the lead cast as well as the film's technical aspects but criticised the lack of pace in the film's screenplay before concluding "the intriguing plot, good performances, Ghibran's innovative background score and camera angles of Sanu Varghese make director Rajesh M. Selva's Thoonga Vanam [sic] worth a watch." M. Suganth of The Times of India also rated the film 3/5 and wrote, "even though the film cleverly spreads the action across various areas in the club [...] it isn't enough to shake off the feeling of claustrophobia. By the time the film gets over, we feel exhausted." Karthik Keramalu of IBNLive gave 2.5/5 stars and wrote, "Actors move in and out of rooms, run this way and that, plot and fail, hide and seek. Yet all the effort of the cast and crew is shaken and not stirred enough as the screenplay gets a few nods wrong."

Baradwaj Rangan, writing for The Hindu, stated that the film picks up in the post-interval portions "the kitchen-sink action choreography, the sounds of things breaking and clattering, the bursts of background score, the jittery camerawork", concluding the film as "an okay thriller", but criticised Rajesh Selva for not giving the output to the dazzle of Brian De Palma films. Sify described the film as a "classy thriller that gives an edge of the seat ride with world class action sequences and no-nonsense execution!". Haasan, Prakash Raj, Sampath Raj, Kishore and Trisha were appreciated for their performances, while they concluded mentioning about the technical aspects like music, action, editing and camera work that gave an edge to the film. R S Prakash of Bangalore Mirror wrote, "It is Kamal Haasan all the way, and he asserts his class and caliber. Even in scenes where emotional outbursts would have been natural, the seasoned star has refrained from turning melodramatic".

=== Cheekati Rajyam ===
Sangeetha Devi Dundoo of The Hindu stated, "though the film isn't really exceptional, makes for an engaging watch". She also mentioned the performance of Kamal Haasan, Prakash Raj and Trisha as good, concluding the film as a stylish cop drama as attention is paid even to little details of the film making. Suresh Kaviyarani of Deccan Chronicle wrote, "Though the second half is a bit slow, overall the movie is good as it is a nice departure from the regular masala films".

== Box office ==
The film grossed over ₹50 crore worldwide. Its box office shortcomings were attributed by journalists to the 2015 South India floods.
