= Venkatesh filmography =

Films of Venkatesh

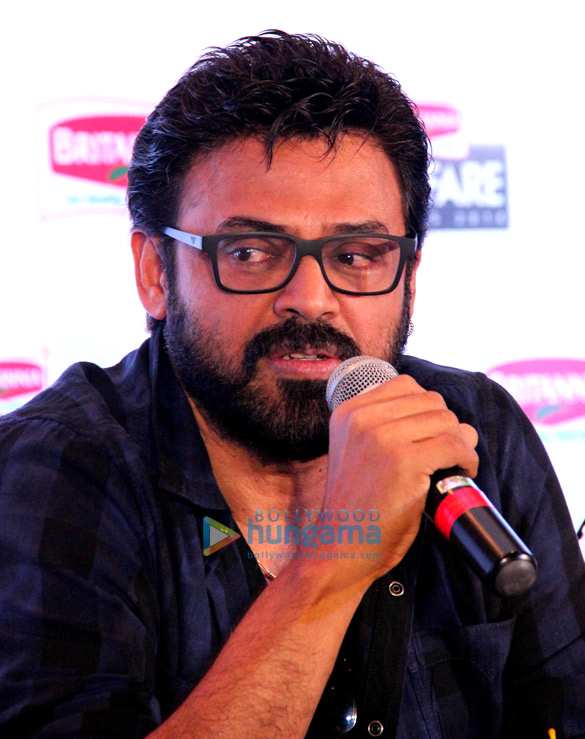
Venkatesh at the 62nd Filmfare Awards South press conference

Venkatesh is an Indian actor known for his works predominantly in Telugu cinema. In a career spanning 38 years, he starred in 76 feature films. He has received seven state Nandi awards, and six Filmfare Awards for best acting.

Along with his brother D. Suresh Babu, Venkatesh is the co-owner of Suresh Productions, one of the largest film production companies in India. Venkatesh has starred in several of his films under this production, most of them turned out to be blockbusters, owing to this, he is widely known as Victory Venkatesh in the media. Apart from films, He is the mentor of Telugu Warriors representing Tollywood in Celebrity Cricket League.

== Film ==
Key
†	Denotes films that have not yet been released

- All films are in Telugu unless otherwise noted.

=== As actor ===
List of Venkatesh film acting credits
Year	Title	Role	Notes	Ref.
1971	Prema Nagar	Young Kesava Varma	Child artist	
1972	Vasantha Maligai	Young Vijay Kumar	Child artist; Tamil film; footage reused from Prema Nagar	
1986	Kaliyuga Pandavulu	Vijay		
1986	Brahma Rudrulu	Satya Prasad		
1987	Ajeyudu	Murali		
1987	Bharatamlo Arjunudu	Arjun		
1987	Trimurtulu	Raja		
1987	Vijetha Vikram	Vikram		
1987	Srinivasa Kalyanam	Srinivas		
1988	Raktha Tilakam	Krishna Prasad		
1988	Brahma Puthrudu	Sakthi		
1988	Swarna Kamalam	Chandra Sehkar		
1988	Varasudochhadu	Raghu / Bose		
1989	Prema	Pruthvi		
1989	Ontari Poratam	Raja		
1989	Dhruva Nakshatram	Dhruva Kumar		
1989	Jayammu Nischayammu Raa	Himself	Cameo appearance	
1989	Two Town Rowdy	Sakthi		
1990	Aggiramudu	Aggi Ramudu; Vijay (Note: Dual role)		
1990	Bobbili Raja	Raja		
1991	Sathruvu	Ashok		
1991	Coolie No.1	Raju / Bharath		
1991	Surya IPS	Surya		
1991	Kshana Kshanam	Chandu		
1992	Chanti	Chanti		
1992	Chinarayudu	Chinarayudu		
1992	Sundarakanda	Venkateswarlu		
1993	Anari	Rama	Hindi film	
1993	Kondapalli Raja	Raja		
1993	Abbaigaru	Dora Babu		
1994	Super Police	Vijay		
1994	Muddula Priyudu	Ramu; Raju		
1995	Pokiri Raja	Chanti; Balaraju		
1995	Taqdeerwala	Suraj	Hindi film	
1996	Dharma Chakram	Rakesh		
1996	Sahasa Veerudu Sagara Kanya	Ravi Chandra		
1996	Intlo Illalu Vantintlo Priyuralu	Sriram		
1996	Saradha Bullodu	Vijay		
1996	Pavithra Bandham	Vijay		
1997	Chinnabbayi	Sundarayya		
1997	Preminchukundam Raa	Giri		
1997	Pellichesukundam	Aanand		
1998	Suryavamsam	Harischandra Prasad; Bhanu Prasad		
1998	Ganesh	Ganesh		
1998	Premante Idera	Murali		
1999	Raja	Raja		
1999	Seenu	Seenu		
2000	Kalisundam Raa	Raghu		
2000	Jayam Manade Raa	Mahadeva Naidu; Rudrama Naidu / Abhiram	Dual role in both films	
2001	Devi Putrudu	Balaram; Krishna	Dual role in both films	
2001	Prematho Raa	Chandra Sekhar "Chandu"		
2001	Nuvvu Naaku Nachav	Venkateswarlu "Venky"		
2002	Vasu	Vasu		
2002	Gemeni	Gemeni		
2003	Vasantham	Ashok		
2004	Malliswari	Vara Prasad		
2004	Gharshana	DCP Raamachandra		
2005	Sankranthi	Raghavendra		
2005	Subash Chandra Bose	Subash Chandra Bose; Asok		
2006	Lakshmi	Lakshmi Narayana		
2007	Adavari Matalaku Ardhalu Verule	Ganesh		
2007	Tulasi	Parvathaneni Tulasi Ram		
2008	Chintakayala Ravi	Ravi		
2009	Eenaadu	Commissioner Eeshwar Prasad		
2010	Namo Venkatesa	Parvateneni Venkataramana "Venky"		
2010	Nagavalli	Naagabhairava Raajasekhara; Vijay		
2012	Bodyguard	Venkatadri / Venky		
2012	Krishnam Vande Jagadgurum	Ballari Babu	Special appearance in the song "Sye Andre Nanu"	
2013	Seethamma Vakitlo Sirimalle Chettu	Peddodu		
2013	Shadow	Rajaram		
2013	Masala	Venkata Raja Narasimha Balaram		
2014	Drushyam	Rambabu		
2015	Gopala Gopala	Gopalaraao		
2016	Babu Bangaram	ACP Krishna		
2016	Premam	DCP Rama Chandra	Cameo appearance	
2017	Guru	Aditya		
2018	Agnyaathavaasi	Guru	Cameo appearance	
2019	F2: Fun and Frustration	Venky		
2019	Venky Mama	Venkataratnam "Military Naidu " Venky Mama""		
2021	Narappa	Narappa		
2021	Drushyam 2	Rambabu		
2022	F3: Fun and Frustration	Venky		
2022	Ori Devuda	God	Extended Cameo	
2023	Kisi Ka Bhai Kisi Ki Jaan	Gundamaneni Balakrishna alias "Rowdy Anna"	Hindi film	
2024	Saindhav	Saindhav Koneru "SaiKo"	75th Film	
2025	Sankranthiki Vasthunam	Yadagiri Damodara Sinaraju IPS "Raju" alias YD Raju / Yama Dharma Raju		
2026	Mana Shankara Vara Prasad Garu	Venky Gowda	Extended Cameo	
2026	Aadarsha Kutumbam House No: 47 - AK47	Chittibabu		
2027	January 12 Vidudala †	Col. Venkat Reddy	Filming	

== Television ==
List of Venkatesh television series credits
Year	Title	Role	Network	Language	Notes
2023–present	Rana Naidu	Naga Naidu	Netflix	Hindi	
2023	Maya Bazaar For Sale	–	ZEE5	Telugu	Producer only

== Voice acting ==
List of Venkatesh voice acting credits
Year	Title	Role	Notes	Ref.
2018	Srinivasa Kalyanam	–	Narrator	
2019	Aladdin	Genie	Telugu dub; portrayed by Will Smith	
2021	Krack	–	Narrator	
2021	Mosagallu	–	Narrator	

== As playback singer ==
List of Venkatesh playback singing credits
Year	Title	Song	Ref.
2017	Guru	"Jingidi"	
2025	Sankranthiki Vasthunam	"Blockbuster Pongal"	
