= Irudhi Suttru =

2016 film by Sudha Kongara

Irudhi Suttru/Saala Khadoos
- Theatrical release poster in Tamil
- Directed by: Sudha Kongara
- Screenplay by: Sudha Kongara R.Madhavan Sunanda Raghunathan; Arun Matheswaran (Tamil dialogue)
- Story by: Sudha Kongara
- Produced by: S. Sashikanth; C. V. Kumar (Tamil); R. Madhavan; Rajkumar Hirani (Hindi)
- Starring: R. Madhavan; Ritika Singh
- Cinematography: Sivakumar Vijayan
- Edited by: Sathish Suriya
- Music by: Score: Sanjay Wandrekar; Atul Raninga (Hindi version); Songs: Santhosh Narayanan
- Production companies: UTV Motion Pictures; YNOT Studios; Tricolour Films (Hindi); Rajkumar Hirani Films (Hindi); Thirukumaran Entertainment (Tamil)
- Distributed by: UTV Motion Pictures (Hindi); Dream Factory (Tamil)
- Release date: 29 January 2016
- Running time: 109 minutes
- Country: India
- Languages: Tamil; Hindi

Irudhi Suttru (transl. Final round) is a 2016 Indian sports drama film co written and directed by Sudha Kongara. Filmed simultaneously in Tamil and Hindi, with the latter being titled as Saala Khadoos (transl. Bloody grumpy), the film stars R. Madhavan as boxing coach who is ignored by the boxing association, tries to accomplish his dream by training an amateur boxer, Madhi, played by Ritika Singh in her acting debut. Both the Tamil and Hindi versions are produced by S. Sashikanth for YNOT Studios and UTV Motion Pictures, while C. V. Kumar's Thirukumaran Entertainment and Dream Factory distributed the Tamil version and the Hindi version was jointly distributed by Madhavan himself under the Tricolour Films banner along with Rajkumar Hirani Films.

Kongara wrote the script for the film in early 2011, and approached Madhavan for the leading role, for whom the film marks his comeback to Tamil cinema after four years. The pre-production works of the film began during 2013 and was officially announced by Sashikanth in May 2014. The film's shooting began in July 2014 and completed that December, with the entire film was shot within fifty days. Featuring music composed by Santhosh Narayanan, with a background score by Sanjay Wandrekar and Atul Raninga (for the Hindi version), the film has cinematography by Sivakumar Vijayan and editing by Sathish Suriya.

Both versions Irudhi Suttru and Saala Khadoos opened on 29 January 2016. Unlike the Hindi version which received mixed reviews, the Tamil version opened to critical acclaim, praising the performances of Madhavan and Singh, and the story, direction and other technical aspects. A commercial success at the box office, Irudhi Suttru won the National Award for Special Mention (Ritika Singh), six Tamil Nadu State Film Awards, three Filmfare Awards: Best Director (Kongara), Best Actor (Madhavan), Best Actress (Ritika Singh). In addition, the film won three awards each at the Ananda Vikatan Cinema Awards, IIFA Utsavam Awards and SIIMA Awards. The film was later remade by Kongara herself in Telugu language as Guru (2017) with several members of the cast reprising their respective roles and Venkatesh reprising Madhavan's role. It also marks UTV's final regional cinema project.

== Plot ==
Prabhu Selvaraj/Aditya "Adi" Tomar is a talented yet failed boxer who, despite being very gifted in boxing, falls victim to the dirty politics in the boxing association. Due to this, he loses his chance to go to the 1996 Summer Olympics. 15 years later, he is a government coach for the national women's boxing training academy but is always extremely angry with the lethargic attitude of boxers and frustrated with the partiality in selection. Due to his constant rift with the association head Dev Khatri, he is falsely charged with sexual harassment in Delhi and gets transferred to Chennai to identify and develop new women boxers. Despite the very poor infrastructure, Prabhu/Adi manages to find natural talent in a roadside fish seller named Ezhil Madhi, who he notices while she is thrashing the judges during her elder sister Lakshmi "Lux"'s tournament.

Ignoring Lux who has been boxing for eight years to get a sports quota government job, Prabhu/Adi offers to pay and train Madhi for a few hours daily. Unfortunately, the two do not get along due to Adi's ruthless training methods and Madhi's aggressive nature. As a result, Madhi intentionally loses a local match. Adi later asks Lux and Madhi's parents, Saamikannu and Damayanthi, to send them to stay in a hostel with him so that their daughters can work hard on training. Madhi misunderstands him but later regrets it when she finds out that Prabhu/Adi has sold his beloved bike to buy new training equipment for her. Madhi then starts training with Prabhu/Adi and develops feelings for him. On the day of a qualifying match, she reveals her feelings to Prabhu/Adi, but he promptly rejects her. During the warm-up before the match, a now jealous Lux injures Madhi's hand, causing Madhi to lose the chance to the Olympics. Angry, Prabhu/Adi thinks that Madhi lost intentionally again and throws her out of training camp.

Dev takes advantage of the situation by calling Madhi to Delhi for a cultural exchange tournament and makes her fight with a heavyweight Russian boxer, Natalia, who knocks out Madhi in 08 seconds. A demotivated Madhi is then approached by Dev with an indecent proposal, to which she reacts by injuring him. Dev takes revenge by getting her arrested on false theft charges. Prabhu/Adi comes to the rescue and bails her out by paying one lakh rupees. The junior coach states that they would have to pay a considerably lower amount if Madhi had agreed to stay in jail for a few days. To this, Prabhu/Adi states that he would have bailed her out even if he had to pay one and a half lakh. He later takes Madhi to Delhi to get her a wild-card entry into the World Boxing Championship, to be held in Goa, two months later. Many people in the association, including Lux, accuse Madhi of offering sexual favours to Prabhu/Adi. Ignoring all the accusations, Madhi works hard, enters the tournament representing India and goes on to win the semifinal.

One hour before finals, Dev refuses to sign Madhi's boxer entry to the match and blackmails Prabhu/Adi to resign immediately if he wants to see Madhi in the final, with Natalia in Delhi. Prabhu/Adi resigns from his government job, and Madhi who gets to fight in the final round is dejected after learning about Prabhu/Adi's resignation. She runs to the quarter allocated to Prabhu/Adi and questions his decision. To which he replies that, Madhi has to play for herself, him and thousands of other Indian girls who dream to enter the sports arena. A reluctant Madhi leaves for the match after stating that the fact Prabhu/Adi resigned for her shows his love for her. In the match, she keeps losing points in the early rounds and gets badly injured before Prabhu/Adi shows up at the stadium and indicates her to attack her opponent's arms to make her weak as Genghis Khan did to his enemies. Madhi follows the game plan and knocks out the opponent with seconds to go in the final round. Dev quickly jumps into the ring to take the credit for training Madhi, but she overpowers him for all his mischieves he did to her and runs to Prabhu/Adi. Madhi and Prabhu/Adi hug each other, showing their emotional reunion. Prabhu/Adi whispers to Madhi, "My Muhammad Ali".

== Cast ==
- R. Madhavan as Prabhu Selvaraj (Tamil) / Aditya "Adi" Tomar (Hindi)
- Ritika Singh as Ezhil Madhi
- Mumtaz Sorcar as Lakshmi a.k.a. “Lux”
- Nassar as "Punch" Pandian
- Radha Ravi as Muralikrishnan (Tamil version)
- M. K. Raina as Rakesh (Hindi version)
- Zakir Hussain as Dev Khatri
- Kaali Venkat as Saamikannu (Samuel)
- Baljinder Kaur as Damayanthi
- Venkatesan Devarajan as Referee
- Sanchana Natarajan as Boxing Student
- Bipin as Innocent
- Ravindra Vijay as Genghis Khan boxer

== Production ==
=== Development ===
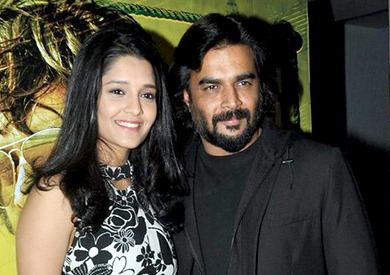
Lead actors, Madhavan and Singh at promotions

During the production of her first directorial venture Drohi in 2010, Kongara began writing a sports drama film on boxing after reading an editorial in The Hindu about North Chennai and its boxing culture. Kongara consequently began gathering further information about female boxers and networked with Indian Olympic athletes including Mary Kom, in order to help write her script. In September 2011, she approached R. Madhavan, who was on a sabbatical from Tamil films, to portray the lead role in the film and his presence in the project helped take the financial viability of the venture to a higher level. The pair had previously collaborated in Madhavan's films under the direction of Mani Ratnam, where Kongara had been an assistant director. Portraying a retired boxer, Madhavan grew a thick beard and sported long hair for his role in the film, while embarking on an intense body conditioning regime in Los Angeles during 2013. Reports erroneously suggested that Madhavan was playing a role in another sports drama film, a biopic of the Indian boxer Mary Kom, and he clarified that he was acting on a separate film on boxing. Ashvini Yardi was initially announced as the film's producer and began casting real life boxers including fighters from the Super Fight League for the film. But, YNOT Studios and Thirukumaran Entertainment agreed to jointly produce the film in May 2014, with Santhosh Narayanan subsequently signed on to compose the film's music. The team also brought in director Rajkumar Hirani, as a result of his close association with Madhavan, to act as creative producer for the film and he helped doctor the script to give it a pan-Indian appeal.

The film's Hindi title was first revealed to be Zara, then Laal and then was changed to Saala Khadoos in June 2014, with reports suggesting that the film would be loosely based on the life of boxing icon Muhammad Ali, a claim the team denied. The film's Tamil title Irudhi Suttru was announced shortly after, with the team beginning production from 14 July 2014. Two professional boxers from a boxing academy, Ritika Singh and Mumtaz Sorcar, who has done films in Bengali, were signed to play the two female leads. Singh had been initially spotted by Kongara on an advert for the Super Fight League competition, and successfully auditioned for the lead character's role after being reached through the competition's organiser Raj Kundra. Kaali Venkat and Baljinder Kaur were signed to play the parents of Singh and Mumtaz, while veteran actors Nassar, Radharavi and Zakir Hussain were all also signed on to play pivotal roles, and took part in pre-filming rehearsals with the rest of the cast. Action choreographers Stunner Sam from Chennai and Tom Delmar from London were signed on to work on the film, while Alexander Cortes worked as Madhavan's personal trainer. Madhavan's friend, actress Shilpa Shetty, also helped Madhavan gain and lose weight effectively during the period, doubling up as a dietician and fitness coach.

=== Filming ===
A small official launch event was held on 8 August 2014 and the team began a schedule shoot in Chennai thereafter. Scenes were shot in the tsunami-hit region slums of Srinivasapuram for the initial days of shoot. By October 2014, it was reported that the film was sixty percent complete, with most scenes being shot in the areas surrounding Chennai. The team then shot for a schedule in Dharamshala, before returning to Ooty to finish filming portions. Madhavan suffered a minor injury on the sets during the last week, but continued through the pain to finish the film. Filming portions for the venture were completed in mid-November 2014 after forty two days of shoot. Post-production works took place throughout 2015 and several potential release dates were evaded. Rajkumar Hirani's late inclusion in the project meant that he requested the team to re-shoot certain portions, with Madhavan regrowing a long beard after having removed it in December 2014. The team subsequently shot for ten further days in late 2015, while completing patchwork. Throughout the production of the film and dubbing purposes, Madhavan wore metal braces inside his teeth, in order to create the effect of having a lisp that most boxers have from sporting injuries.

== Music ==
The film's soundtrack album is composed by Santhosh Narayanan for both Tamil and Hindi versions. While Santhosh composed the film score for the Tamil version, the Hindi version Saala Khadoos of the score was composed by Sanjay Wandrekar and Atul Raninga, as per the suggestion of distributor Rajkumar Hirani, since both of them had worked on the score for his films 3 Idiots (2009) (which also starred Madhavan) and PK (2014). Lyrics for the soundtrack of Saala Khadoos were entirely penned by Swanand Kirkire, whilst Vivek and Muthamil wrote the tracks for Irudhi Suttru. The album of Hindi version was released first on 2 January 2016, while the album of the Tamil version was released on 4 January 2016 at an event held at Sathyam Cinemas, Chennai.

== Marketing and release ==
Varun Manian's Radiance Media initially agreed to distribute the Tamil version of the film, collaborating with YNOT Studios and Thirukumaran Entertainment, but later opted out of the agreement. The Hindi version was jointly distributed by Rajkumar Hirani's production house and Madhavan's Tricolour Films, for which the film is the first project. A teaser trailer for the Hindi version was attached to the theatrical release of Rajkumar Hirani's PK, while the Tamil version's teaser was also released with Prabhu Solomon's Kayal in December 2014. During the period of post-production work throughout 2015, Madhavan and Hirani held several screenings of the film to select audiences in order to observe opinions and gather feedback. Promotions for the film began again in late November 2015, when UTV Motion Pictures announced that they would also be a part of the production and would distribute the film alongside the other production houses. The trailer of the Hindi version Saala Khadoos released on 15 December 2015, while a differently edited Tamil version was released two days later. The trailers received widespread critical acclaim and were promoted by several members of the Indian film industry.

In early January 2016, the film began their marketing campaign with the makers travelling to Madurai and Coimbatore for promotions, after launching the Tamil version of the soundtrack in Chennai. With a publicity budget of 9 crore rupees, the promotions were described by The Hindu to be "unlike other film promotions in the South", considering that most film teams in the Tamil film industry do not usually tour around the state publicising their project. During his time in Coimbatore, Madhavan visited a college and delivered a motivational speech, while he also made several television appearances for special shows to be broadcast on Pongal and Republic Day. The team travelled extensively between Mumbai and Chennai to promote the film, while a further trailer for the Tamil version was cut and released ten days before the film opened. Before the release of the film, the team held several screenings to select Hindi and Tamil audiences and edited the film accordingly to the taste of the audiences. The team also held two première shows in Hindi and Tamil for the film industry, in the week leading up to the film's release. The satellite rights of the film's Tamil version were sold to Jaya TV and the Hindi version were sold to SET Max. Irudhi Suttru was later screened at the 29th Tokyo International Film Festival during October 2016 and was then also selected to be a part of the Indian Panorama section at 47th International Film Festival of India.

== Reception ==
=== Critical reception ===
Malini Mannath from The New Indian Express stated that Irudhi Suttru had "a finely crafted screenplay, deft treatment and some fine performances which make it an engaging watch", while giving particular praise to Madhavan and Singh's performances. Similarly, Business Standard stated that "Madhavan breathes life into the role of a grumpy coach with ease and élan, while the extremely impressive newbie Ritika Singh steals the show with a knockout performance", adding that "there's no way any other actress could've done a better job than Ritika in this role". Sify stated that the film was "a perfect sports drama, which should not be missed" and added that "this inspirational effort has a superb screenplay with all the typical elements of a good sports film in place", while Rediff.com agreed that the film was "not to be missed", adding "its refreshing characters, enjoyable plot, great music and visuals keeps you hooked". Baradwaj Rangan of The Hindu stated it was "a heart-warming boxing drama".

Saala Khadoos received primarily mixed reviews. Bollywood Hungama described it as a "euphoric and electrifying film with amazing performances from the lead cast" and "is definitely engaging, and inspiring". The critic added "it truly deserves an ovation and is worth your time and money", while stating Madhavan "delivers an extraordinary and extremely realistic performance", while Singh "is definitely a revelation and a find of Bollywood". Critic Subhash K. Jha wrote "Saala Khadoos promised a rugged sports film and it delivers", while adding "the film itself doesn't match up to the glory of its stunning visual velocity or its leading man towering performance". Other critics felt that the film "failed to rise above the clichés of a sports film", though CNN-IBN stated it "succeeds in creating a credible world and, thanks to affecting performances from its principal players, gives us characters that we can care about". Similarly, NDTV wrote "it has enough heart, it's the heat that is missing".

=== Box office ===
The Tamil version of the film collected close to ₹17 lakh (US$18,000) to total of ₹84.09 lakh (US$87,000) and ₹56.98 lakh (US$59,000) in first weekend. The film collected ₹19.93 lakh (US$21,000) in UK and ₹16.96 lakh (US$18,000) in Australia.

== Controversy ==
Following the film's release Indian Boxer Thulasi Helen claimed that Irudhi Suttru was her real life story, stating that she narrated her real life accidents to Sudha Kongara and she used them without her consent, not crediting her name in the film. When Helen questioned Sudha, she threatened her.

== Awards and nominations ==
Award (Note: Awards, festivals and organisations are in alphabetical order.)	Date of ceremony (Note: Date is linked to the article about the awards held that year, wherever possible.)	Category	Nominee(s)	Result	Ref.
Ananda Vikatan Cinema Awards	6 January 2017	Best Actress	Ritika Singh	Won	
Ananda Vikatan Cinema Awards	6 January 2017	Best Music Director	Santhosh Narayanan	Won	
Ananda Vikatan Cinema Awards	6 January 2017	Best Dance Choreographer	Dinesh	Won	
IIFA Utsavam	28–29 March 2017	Best Film	S. Sashikanth	Won	
IIFA Utsavam	28–29 March 2017	Best Actor	R. Madhavan	Won	
IIFA Utsavam	28–29 March 2017	Best Actress	Ritika Singh	Won	
Filmfare Awards South	17 June 2017	Best Film – Tamil	S. Sashikanth	Nominated	
Filmfare Awards South	17 June 2017	Best Director – Tamil	Sudha Kongara	Won	
Filmfare Awards South	17 June 2017	Best Actor – Tamil	R. Madhavan	Won	
Filmfare Awards South	17 June 2017	Best Actress – Tamil	Ritika Singh	Won	
National Film Awards	28 March 2016	Special Mention (Feature Film)	Ritika Singh	Won	
South Indian International Movie Awards	30 June–1 July 2017	Best Film	S. Sashikanth	Won	
South Indian International Movie Awards	30 June–1 July 2017	Best Director	Sudha Kongara	Nominated	
South Indian International Movie Awards	30 June–1 July 2017	Best Actor	R. Madhavan	Nominated	
South Indian International Movie Awards	30 June–1 July 2017	Best Actor (Critics)	R. Madhavan	Won	
South Indian International Movie Awards	30 June–1 July 2017	Best Debut Actress	Ritika Singh	Won	
Tamil Nadu State Film Awards	6 March 2024	Best Director	Sudha Kongara	Won	
Tamil Nadu State Film Awards	6 March 2024	Best Actor	R. Madhavan	Won	
Tamil Nadu State Film Awards	6 March 2024	Best Film- Special prize	S. Sashikanth	Won	
Tamil Nadu State Film Awards	6 March 2024	Best Actress - Special prize	Ritika Singh	Won	
Tamil Nadu State Film Awards	6 March 2024	Best Make-up Artist	Sabari Girishan	Won	
Tamil Nadu State Film Awards	6 March 2024	Best Female Dubbing Artist	R. Uma Maheshwari	Won	

== Remake ==
Sudha Kongara announced a Telugu remake of this film, following its success. It was titled as Guru (2017) with Venkatesh in the lead role alongside Ritika Singh, reprising her role from the original film.

== See also ==
- List of boxing films
