= Suresh Krissna =

Indian film director (born 1959)

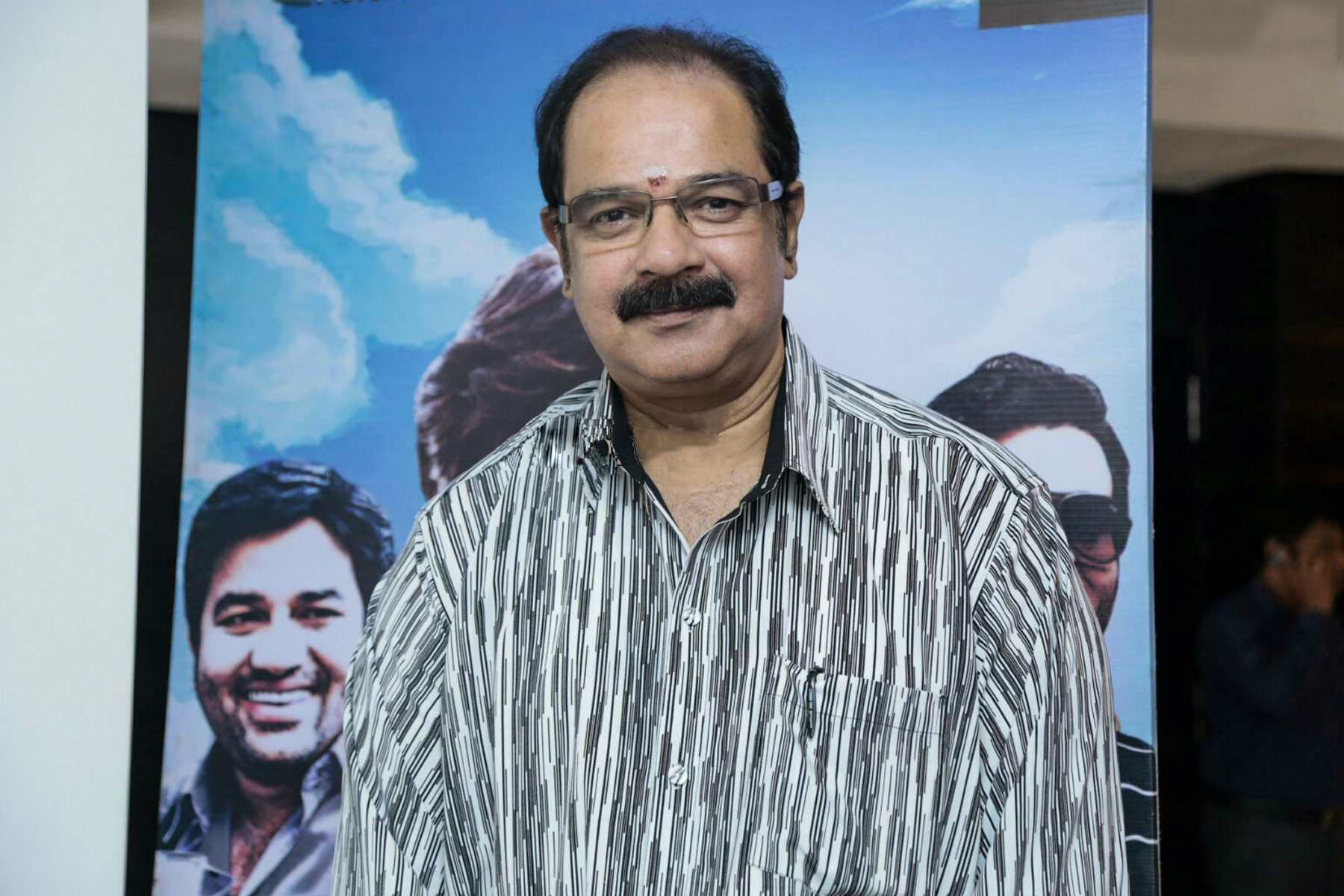
- Born: 25 June 1959 (age 67); Bombay, Bombay State, India
- Occupations: Film director; writer
- Years active: 1988 – present
- Spouse: Chandra (m. 1989)
- Relatives: Shanthi Krishna (sister)

Suresh Krissna (born 25 June 1959) is an Indian film director who has directed Tamil, Telugu, Malayalam, Kannada, and Hindi-language films. His first film as a director was Sathyaa (1988), with Kamal Haasan. He is well known for having directed Rajinikanth in four films which include, Annaamalai (1992), Veera (1994), Baashha (1995) and Baba (2002).

== Early life and career ==
Suresh was born to R. Krishna and K. Sharada in Bombay. He has two brothers, Sreeram and Satheesh, and one sister, actress Shanthi Krishna.

He spent his early career in Mumbai. After completing his graduation in economics he joined the Mumbai office of L. V. Prasad for accounts management. Later he became an executive assistant to L. V. Prasad and also took care of the Prasad Productions Mumbai office. When L. V. Prasad started production of Ek Duuje Ke Liye (1981), directed by K. Balachander, he assisted Prasad Productions on location. After completion of the film he went on to work for K. Balachander first assisting in Thaneer Thaneer (1981). Later he was elevated to associate director status in Achamillai Achamillai (1984).

Suresh first directorial debut film was Sathyaa (1988) starring Kamal Haasan which was a remake of the Hindi movie Arjun starring Sunny Deol. In 1989, he received the Nandi Award for Best Director for Prema. Suresh Krissna became famous after he worked with Rajinikanth in the 1992 movie Annaamalai. The movie became successful at the box office with a 175-day run. In 1995, Rajnikanth and Suresh Krissna paired up once again for the movie Baashha, which received an appraisal and it broke Annamalai's record at the Box Office. The movie is considered as one of the breaking points in Rajinikanth's career. He followed up Baasha, with another gangster film, The Prince in Malayalam starring Mohanlal. The fil which was a box-office disappointment. In 1997, Suresh Krissna directed a Telugu movie, Master starring Chiranjeevi.The film was a box-office success. In 2002, he began working on a film titled Vamana featuring Ajith Kumar, Reema Sen and Sneha. Despite the beginning production, the film was later stalled.

Suresh Krissna has directed movies like Baba (2002), Rocky – The Rebel (2006), Ilaignan (2011) and Katari Veera Surasundarangi (2012). In 2012, Suresh Krissna published a book called 'My Days with Baashha', in which the director has penned down his memories of making super hit films with Rajnikanth. Rajnikanth in an interview said that directors Suresh Krissna and Mani Ratnam are the ones who made him a Superstar.

He has directed films in many languages starring leading heroes like Rajinikanth, Kamal Haasan, Mohanlal, Chiranjeevi, Venkatesh, Nagarjuna, Vishnuvardhan and Salman Khan. Suresh Krissna, who has directed about 40 films so far, has also directed series on leading television channels like Sun TV and Vijay TV. He directed the Mahabharatham (2013) serial on Sun TV. Suresh Krissna is getting into the web series space with In the Name of God (2021), to be streamed in Telugu, which he has produced. He made his comeback as director with the films Anantha and Charukesi both released in 2026.

== Filmography ==
=== Films ===
Year	Title	Language	Notes
1988	Sathyaa	Tamil	
1989	Prema	Telugu	Dubbed in Tamil as Anbu Chinnam; Remade in Hindi as Love
1989	Indrudu Chandrudu	Telugu	Dubbed in Tamil as Indran Chandran; Dubbed in Hindi as Mayor Saab
1990	Raja Kaiya Vacha	Tamil	
1991	Amma	Telugu	
1991	Love	Hindi	
1992	Sahasam	Telugu	
1992	Jaagruti	Hindi	
1992	Annaamalai	Tamil	
1992	Vasundhara	Telugu	Nandi Award for Second Best Story Writer
1993	Vedan	Tamil	
1993	Rojavai Killathe	Tamil	
1994	Veera	Tamil	
1995	Baashha	Tamil	
1996	The Prince	Malayalam	
1996	Dharma Chakram	Telugu	
1996	Sivasakthi	Tamil	
1997	Master	Telugu	
1997	Aahaa..!	Tamil	
1998	Auto Driver	Telugu	
1998	Aaha..!	Telugu	Remake of Tamil film Aahaa..!
1999	Oruvan	Tamil	
1999	Sangamam	Tamil	
2000	Rayalaseema Ramanna Chowdary	Telugu	
2001	Daddy	Telugu	
2001	Aalavandhan	Tamil	Simultaneously made in Hindi as Abhay.
2002	Baba	Tamil	
2003	Idi Maa Ashokgadi Love Story	Telugu	
2003	Raghavendra	Telugu	
2003	Kadamba	Kannada	
2004	Bhadradri Ramudu	Telugu	
2004	Gajendra	Tamil	
2005	Jyeshta	Kannada	
2006	Astram	Telugu	
2006	Rocky – The Rebel	Hindi	
2007	Parattai Engira Azhagu Sundaram	Tamil	
2009	Mestri	Telugu	
2009	Arumugam	Tamil	
2011	Ilaignan	Tamil	
2012	Katari Veera Surasundarangi	Kannada	Nominated, SIIMA Award for Best Director
2026	Anantha	Tamil	
2026	Charukesi	Tamil	

=== Television ===
Year(s)	Title	Network	Language	Notes
2012	Aaha	Vijay TV	Tamil	
2013	Mahabharatham	Sun TV	Tamil	
2013–2014	Unarvugal	Puthuyugam TV	Tamil	
2014	Arangetram	Puthuyugam TV	Tamil	
2015–2017	Lakshmi Vanthachu	Zee Tamil	Tamil	Producer only
2017	Prema	ETV	Telugu	Television film
2018–2019	Chandrakumari	Sun TV	Tamil	
2019–2020	Chocolate	Sun TV	Tamil	
2021–2022	Ente Kuttikalude Achan	Mazhavil Manorama	Malayalam	Producer only
2021	In the Name of God	Aha	Telugu	Producer only
2023–present	Sakthi IPs	DD Tamil	Tamil	

=== Assistant Director ===
Year	Title	Language	Notes
1981	Ek Duuje Ke Liye	Hindi	
1982	Agni Sakshi	Hindi	
1983	Kokilamma	Telugu	
1984	Ek Nai Paheli	Hindi	
1984	Achamillai Achamillai	Tamil	
1984	Eradu Rekhegalu	Kannada	
1985	Kalyana Agathigal	Tamil	
1985	Sindhu Bhairavi	Tamil	
1985	Mugila Mallige	Kannada	
1986	Sundara Swapnagalu	Kannada	
1986	Punnagai Mannan	Tamil	
1987	Manathil Uruthi Vendum	Tamil	
1988	Rudraveena	Telugu	

== Awards ==
Kalaimamani Honour by Tamil Nadu Government

2014 - Contribution to Film Direction
