= Alaudin =

- DVD cover
- Directed by: Ravi Chakravathy
- Written by: Ravi Chakravathy
- Produced by: V. Satyanarayana; V. Sudhirkumar; V. Sumankumar
- Starring: Prabhu Deva; Ashima Bhalla
- Cinematography: Ramnath Shetty
- Edited by: V. T. Vijayan
- Music by: Mani Sharma
- Production company: Venkateswaralayam
- Release date: 15 August 2003
- Running time: 140 minutes
- Country: India
- Language: Tamil

Alaudin is a 2003 Indian Tamil-language action drama film directed by Ravi Chakravathy. The film stars Prabhu Deva and Ashima Bhalla with Raghuvaran playing the main antagonist. The film was released on 15 August 2003 after many delays.

== Plot ==
Alaudin is a slum man and orphan with a golden heart who fights against injustice faced by his fellow slum dwellers. The people of Alli Kuppam bring him up. To fulfil the day-to-day needs of the poor, Alaudin decides to steal from rich people. His main enemy is the scheming and powerful Gangadhar. During one of his attempts to steal in Gangadhar's house, Alaudin witnesses a murder committed by Gangadhar and gets some implicating evidence: a blood-soaked knife and a cut right thumb of Gangadhar. He cleverly uses this situation and starts blackmailing Gangadhar to accomplish all of Alli Kuppam's needs. Gangadhar becomes his golden goose, his magic lamp, which does his every proposition. Preethi is Gangadhar's manager's daughter, and she falls for Alaudin. All efforts to catch Alaudin fail. In the final move, Gangadhar plans carefully, traps Alaudin, and shoots him at point-blank range. A chance look at the chain worn by Alaudin brings the necessary twist to the story. To his shock, Gangadhar realizes Alaudin is his son who was mistaken to be murdered 25 years ago. The saved Alaudin refuses to accept his father's request to stay back with him and makes a promise that he should not reveal the secret to anyone and that he wants to go back to the Kuppam.

== Cast ==
- Prabhu Deva as Alaudin
- Ashima Bhalla as Preethi
- Raghuvaran as Gangadhar
- Manivannan as Chinnasamy, Preethi's father
- Vinu Chakravarthy as Munusamy
- Charle as Chinnasamy's assistant
- Dhamu as Alaudin's friend
- Vaiyapuri as Alaudin's friend
- Poovilangu Mohan as Sundaram
- Mahanadi Shankar as the Police inspector
- Sukran as Alaudin's friend
- Sabitha Anand as Mallika
- Kalairani as Rasathi
- Shanmugasundari as Slum dweller
- Vandana as Selvi
- Bava Lakshmanan as Astrologer
- Chitti Babu as Auctioneer
- Vincent Roy as Central Minister
- Kovai Senthil as Slum dweller
- LIC Narasimhan as Groom's father
- Singamuthu as Raja Bhai
- Tirupur Ramasamy as Slum dweller
- Jayamani as Thangarasu
- Karnaa Radha as Meesai
- Sahadevan as Genie
- Pon Swathi as Slum dweller
- Pawan as Gangadhar's henchman (uncredited role)
- Aruldoss in an uncredited role

== Soundtrack ==
The soundtrack was composed by Mani Sharma.

Track listing
No.	Title	Lyrics	Singer(s)	Length
1.	"Ukku Ukku Uganda"	Kavivarman	Shankar Mahadevan	4:58
2.	"Yaaro Yaaravan"	Yugabharathi	K. S. Chithra	4:47
3.	"Yendi Ennai"	Pa. Vijay	Ranjith, Kavita Krishnamurti	5:12
4.	"Goyyaka"	Arivumathi	Karthik, Mahalakshmi Iyer	4:46
5.	"Jeeboomba"	Yugabharathi	Karthik, Shreya Ghoshal, Kalpana	5:39
Total length:				25:22

== Reception ==
Sify wrote, "He [Prabhu Deva] has matured as an actor [..] Raghuvaran is terrific as usual in the role of the villain. Ramnath Shetty's camera, Mani Sharma's music and the song picturizations are worth mentioning. On the whole, the film is enjoyable and engaging at times". Mokkarasu of Kalki wrote they have rubbed the miracle lamp. Only smoke comes instead of genie.
