= Ashima Bhalla =

Indian actress

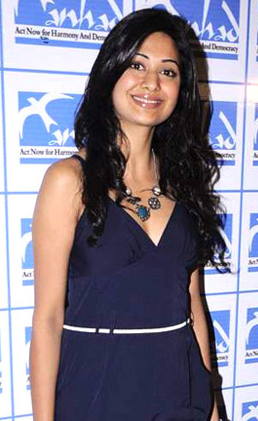
- Born: Assam, India
- Occupations: Actress, Model
- Years active: 2001–2018

Ashima Bhalla is an Indian actress who has appeared in Hindi, Tamil, and Telugu, Kannada language films. She also appeared on television, portraying the lead role in the Indian soap Meri Awaz Ko Mil Gayi Roshni on StarPlus. She also participated in the show Ek Khiladi Ek Haseena alongside Irfan Pathan.

== Filmography ==
=== Films ===
Year	Film	Role	Language	Notes	Ref.
2001	Pyaar Zindagi Hai	Priya	Hindi	Debut Hindi film	
2001	Daddy	Priya	Telugu	Debut Telugu film	
2002	Na Tum Jaano Na Hum	Tanya Akshay Kapoor	Hindi		
2002	Hathyar	Special Appearance (Dancer)	Hindi	item number	
2002	Ramanaa	Devaki	Tamil	Debut Tamil film	
2003	Alaudin	Preethi	Tamil		
2003	Zinda Dil		Hindi		
2004	Cheppave Chirugali	Nirmala	Telugu		
2004	Jyeshtha	Kanchana	Kannada	Debut Kannada film	
2005	Maa - Where Are You	Shalini	Hindi		
2006	Naidu LLB		Telugu		
2006	Sudesi		Tamil		
2010	Thambi Arjuna	Radhika	Tamil		

=== Television ===
Year	Series	Role	Ref
2007–2008	Meri Awaz Ko Mil Gayi Roshni	Sudha Malik	
2008	Ek Khiladi Ek Haseena	Herself	
2011	Zor Ka Jhatka: Total Wipeout	Herself	
2018	Mere Papa Hero Hiralal	Inspector Mina	

=== Music video ===
Title	singers	Album	Notes
Mujhe Khabar Thi Wo Mera Nahi	Lata Mangeshkar	Saadgi	

== See also ==
- List of Indian film actresses
