= Anantha (film) =

Indian Tamil-language anthology drama film

- Promotional release poster
- Directed by: Suresh Krissna
- Written by: Pa. Vijay (dialogue)
- Screenplay by: Suresh Krissna
- Story by: Suresh Krissna
- Starring: Jagapathi Babu; Suhasini Maniratnam; Y. G. Mahendran
- Cinematography: Sanjay B L
- Edited by: S Richard
- Music by: Deva
- Production company: AP International
- Distributed by: JioHotstar
- Release date: 13 January 2026
- Country: India
- Language: Tamil

Anantha is a 2026 Indian Tamil-language anthology drama film directed by Suresh Krissna and starring Jagapathi Babu, Suhasini Maniratnam, and Y. G. Mahendran. The film is based on the lives of followers of Sathya Sai Baba. The film was released on JioHotstar on 13 January 2026.

== Cast ==
- Jagapathi Babu as Vardhan Rao
- Suhasini Maniratnam as Annapurna
- Y. G. Mahendran as Mahadevan
- Sriranjani as Sita
- Abhirami Venkatachalam as Meenakshi
- Nizhalgal Ravi as Vasudevan
- Thalaivasal Vijay as Meenakshi's father
- Arjun as Doctor
- Dhathsha Dayal as Meenakshi's mother
- Jasiq as Annapurna's son
- Videsh Anand as Annapurna's son
- Uday Mahesh as Puttaparthi Doctor
- Rajendra Kumar Pydipati A. S. as Flight passenger
- Temper Vamsi as Vicky (Note: Although the character was unnamed in the end credits, the name was revealed in the film.)
- Rama Rao Jadhav as Robber
- Mohan Raman as Doctor (uncredited)

Sathya Sai Baba is shown in archive footage.

== Production ==
Suresh Krissna said that when producer Girish spoke about wanting to make a film based on Sai Baba, Krissna asked for three days time to "reflect", but soon had the entire story ready the next day itself in an hour.

== Reception ==
Abhinav Subramanian of The Times of India rated the film 2.5/5 stars and wrote, "Anantha is made for a specific audience: Sathya Sai Baba devotees and those drawn to devotional narratives. For them, it will likely resonate. For others, it's a tough sit". Avad Mohammad of OTTplay gave the film the same rating and wrote, "Overall, Anantha is a devotional drama with a few emotionally well-crafted scenes. Though the film is largely preachy and focused on showcasing the greatness of Sai Baba, it works as a niche watch". A critic from Dina Thanthi wrote that the film's strength is the heart-touching devotional scenes and that the slow-moving screenplay and easily predictable story are its weaknesses.
