= Ritika Singh =

Indian actress and martial artist

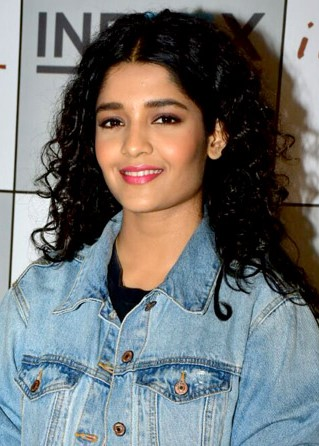
- Ritika Singh in 2018
- Born: Mumbai, Maharashtra India
- Occupations: Actress; martial artist
- Years active: 2016—present
- Awards: National Film Award – Special Jury Award; Filmfare Award for Best Actress – Tamil

Ritika Mohan Singh is an Indian actress and martial artist who predominantly works in Tamil films. Initially a competitive kickboxer and mixed martial artist, she made her acting debut in Sudha Kongara Prasad's Tamil film Irudhi Suttru (also simultaneously shot in Hindi as Saala Khadoos). She received Filmfare Awards three times for the same role in three languages: Tamil (Irudhi Suttru), Hindi (Saala Khadoos) and Telugu (Guru). She has won a National Film Award, one SIIMA award, one Tamil Nadu State Film Award special Prize and three Filmfare Awards.

== Career ==
=== Mixed martial arts ===
Singh was trained in kickboxing and mixed martial arts (MMA) by her father. In 2009, she represented India in kickboxing at the 2009 Asian Indoor Games. In 2012, she competed in MMA at the inaugural season of Super Fight League.

=== Acting career ===
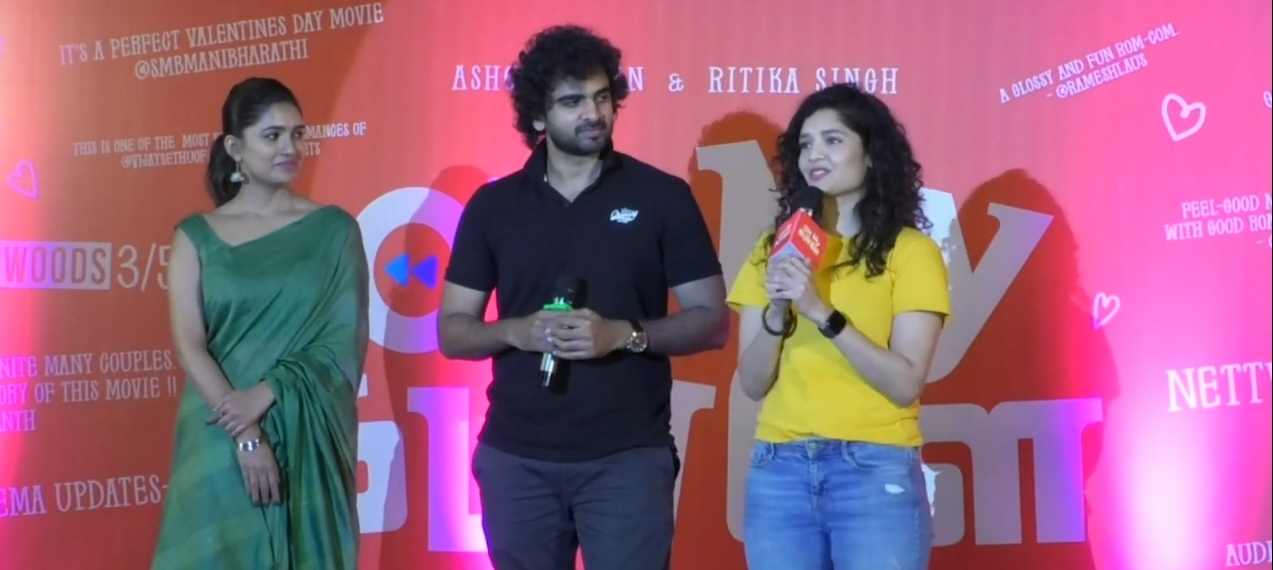
Vani Bhojan, Ashok Selvan and Ritika Singh promoting Oh My Kadavule.

Ritika Singh began her acting career in 2013. She was spotted by director Sudha Kongara Prasad in an advertisement for the Super Fight League, and she later auditioned to play a leading role in her bilingual film, Irudhi Suttru (2016), titled Saala Khadoos in Hindi, after the makers managed to contact her through the competition's chairman, Raj Kundra. Portraying Madhi, a Marwari girl who grows up in the slums of Chennai, Singh was signed because the makers wanted a professional boxer to act, rather than an actress to act as a boxer. For the Tamil version, Irudhi Suttru, Singh phonetically learned her part in Tamil by writing down the dialogues in Hindi. Co-produced by the film's lead actors, R. Madhavan and Rajkumar Hirani, the film was released in 2016. Ritika received rave reviews for her portrayal, with Sify.com stating "she is a marvelous discovery" and "her lip sync, body language, and gait are major highlights for the film". For her performance in Irudhi Suttru, Ritika won the Special Mention at the 63rd National Film Awards and became the first actress who did not dub for her role to be recognised at the National Awards. Singh later appeared in Manikandan's Aandavan Kattalai, which was released in 2016. Her next film is the Telugu movie Guru (2017), a remake of Irudhi Suttru. Later, she performed in the horror comedy P. Vasu's Shivalinga (2017) and the Telugu movie Neevevaro (2018). She played the female protagonist in the romantic fantasy film Oh My Kadavule (2020) with Ashok Selvan.

In 2023, she has starred in leading role in the Hindi survivalist-thriller titled InCar. Later, she acted in the streaming series Story of Things (2023) and Bench Life (2024). Ritika plays a key role in Vettaiyan (2024) who is part of a team of investigators with Rajinikanth's character at the helm.

== Filmography ==
=== Films ===
Key
†	Denotes films that have not yet been released

List of films and roles
Year	Title	Role	Language	Notes
2016	Irudhi Suttru	Ezhil Madhi	Tamil	Bilingual film
2016	Saala Khadoos	Ezhil Madhi	Hindi	Bilingual film
2016	Aandavan Kattalai	Karmeghakuzhali	Tamil	
2017	Guru	Rameshwari "Ramulu"	Telugu	
2017	Shivalinga	Sathyabhama	Tamil	
2018	Neevevaro	Anu	Telugu	
2020	Oh My Kadavule	Anu Paulraj	Tamil	
2023	InCar	Sakshi Gulati	Hindi	
2023	Kolai	Sandhya Mohanraj	Tamil	
2023	King of Kotha	Dancer	Malayalam	Special Appearance in a song
2024	Valari	Divya (Dharshini) and Jaggamma	Telugu	
2024	Mazhai Pidikkatha Manithan	Herself	Tamil	Cameo appearance
2024	Vettaiyan	ASP Roopa Kiran	Tamil	

=== Television ===
Year	Title	Role	Language	Network	Notes	Ref.
2023	Story of Things	Shruthi	Tamil	Sony LIV	Segment: Compressor	
2024	Bench Life	Meenakshi Sharma	Telugu	Sony LIV		

== Awards and nominations ==
List of awards and nominations
Year	Title	Award	Ref.
2016	Irudhi Suttru	National Film Award – Special Jury Award	
2016	Irudhi Suttru	Tamil Nadu State Film Award Special Prize	
2016	Irudhi Suttru	Ananda Vikatan Cinema Award for Best Actress	
2016	Irudhi Suttru	IIFA Utsavam for Best Actress – Tamil	
2016	Irudhi Suttru	Filmfare Award for Best Actress – Tamil	
2016	Irudhi Suttru	SIIMA Award for Best Debut Actress	
2016	Saala Khadoos	Filmfare Award for Best Female Debut	
2016	Saala Khadoos	Zee Cine Award for Best Female Debut	
2018	Guru	Filmfare Critics Award for Best Actress – Telugu	

== Mixed martial arts record ==
Professional record breakdown
4 matches	1 win	3 losses
By knockout	0	1
By submission	0	1
By decision	1	1

Res.	Record	Opponent	Method	Event	Date	Round	Time	Location	Notes
Loss	1–3	Daizy Singh	Decision (Unanimous)	SFL 22-23	17 August 2013	3	5:00	Mumbai, India	
Loss	1–2	Irene Cabello Rivera	Submission (armbar)	SFL 18	24 May 2013	1	2:06	Mumbai, India	
Win	1-1	Aya Saber	Decision (Unanimous)	SFL 11	30 November 2012	3	5:00	Mumbai, India	
Loss	0–1	Manjit Kolekar	TKO (punches)	SFL 5	19 October 2012	2	3:45	Mumbai, India	
