= Story of Things =

Indian drama streaming web series

- Promotional poster
- Genre: Drama
- Written by: George K Antoney
- Directed by: George K Antoney
- Starring: Vinoth Kishan; Anshita Anand; Aditi Balan; Gautami Tadimalla; Arjun Radhakrishnan; Shanthnu Bhagyaraj; Sidhique KM; Archana; Bharath Niwas; Linga; Ritika Singh; Roju
- Composer: Madley Blues
- Country of origin: India
- Original language: Tamil
- No. of seasons: 1
- No. of episodes: 5

Production
- Producer: Hari Prasad Uday
- Production location: India
- Cinematography: Harshvardhan Waghdhare
- Editor: George K Antoney
- Running time: 38-55 minutes
- Production company: Chutzpah Films

Original release
- Network: SonyLIV
- Release: 6 January 2023

Story of Things is a 2023 Indian Tamil-language anthology streaming series consisting of five episodes directed by George K Antoney. Produced by Chutzpah Films, the series stars Vinoth Kishan, Anshita Anand, Aditi Balan, Gautami Tadimalla, Arjun Radhakrishnan, Shanthnu Bhagyaraj, Sidhique KM, Archana, Bharath Niwas, Linga, Ritika Singh, Roju. The music was composed by Madley Blues. The cinematography was handled by Harshvardhan Waghdhare. The editing was done by George K Antoney. The series was released at SonyLIV on 6 January 2023.

== Episodes ==
No.	Title	Directed by	Written by	Original release date
1	"Weighing Scale"	George K Antoney	George K Antoney	6 January 2023
2	"Cellular"	George K Antoney	George K Antoney	6 January 2023
3	"Compressor"	George K Antoney	George K Antoney	6 January 2023
4	"Car"	George K Antoney	George K Antoney	6 January 2023
5	"Mirror"	George K Antoney	George K Antoney	6 January 2023

== Cast ==
Weighing Scale	Cellular	Compressor	Car	Mirror
Bharath as Ram; Linga as Titus	Aditi Balan as Vannamayil; Gautami Tadimalla as Vannamayil's Amma; Arjun Radhakrishnan as Junaid	Ritika Singh as Shurthi; Roju as Raghu	Shanthnu Bhagyaraj as Britto; Sidhique KM as Rathnaraj; Archana as Mary	Vinoth Kishan; Anshita Anand

== Music ==
The Original Series soundtrack is composed by Madley Blues

Track listing
No.	Title	Lyrics	Singer(s)	Length
1.	"Thanimayilae"	Harish Venkat	M.S krsna	3:12
2.	"Vaa"	Harish Venkat	Krithika Nelson	2:29
3.	"Silver Dreams"	Harish Venkat	MC Neel Manidhan	1:50
4.	"Kanamae"	Harish Venkat	Pradeep Kumar	4:07
5.	"A New Day"	Harish Venkat	Akshay Yesodharan	3:18
6.	"Konjam Nadai"	Harish Venkat	M.S Krsna	2:25
7.	"Senja Paavam Ellam"	Harish Venkat	Harish Venkat	3:05
8.	"Vasantha Kaala Mazhai"	Harish Venkat	Jananie S.V	1:55
9.	"Dhinamum"	Harish Venkat	M.S Krsna	3:17
10.	"Thanimayilae (Reprise)"	Harish Venkat	Pradeep Kumar	3:11
Total length:				29:19

== Release ==
The series was released on SonyLIV on 6 January 2023.
