= Valari (film) =

2024 Indian Telugu-language film by M Mrithika Santhoshini

- Release poster
- Directed by: M Mrithika Santhoshini
- Written by: M Mrithika Santhoshini
- Screenplay by: M Mrithika Santhoshini
- Story by: M Mrithika Santhoshini
- Produced by: K Sathya Saibaba
- Starring: Ritika Singh; Sriram
- Cinematography: Sujatha Siddharth
- Edited by: Tammiraju
- Music by: TS Vishnu
- Distributed by: ETV Win
- Release date: 6 March 2024
- Running time: 123 minutes
- Country: India
- Language: Telugu

Valari is a 2024 Indian Telugu-language horror thriller film written and directed by M Mrithika Santhoshini in her directorial debut. The film features Ritika Singh and Sriram in the lead roles.

The film was released on 6 March 2024 on ETV Win.

== Plot ==
A possessed 13-year-old girl murders her parents and brother in a horrific incident. Years later, Divya (Ritika Singh), a devoted homemaker, lives a happy life with her husband, Navy captain Naveen Naidu (Sriram), and their young son (Pharrnitha Rudra Raju). Divya begins to experience a recurring nightmare—vivid visions of the murders—which leave her deeply unsettled.

When Naveen is transferred from Chennai to the coastal port town of Krishnapatnam, the family initially stays in government quarters. From the moment Divya arrives, she feels a strange pull toward an old, abandoned colonial-era bungalow on the outskirts of town. One day, while dropping her son off at school, she notices the bungalow and takes photographs of it. During this visit, her son finds a hairpin and brings it home. Soon afterward, inexplicable events begin to occur: the blender turns on by itself, and the wallpaper and WhatsApp status on Divya's phone repeatedly change to photos of the abandoned house.

Determined to uncover the truth, Divya visits the registrar's office to learn more about the bungalow's history and ownership. While collecting the necessary documents, she is involved in an accident and develops amnesia. As time passes, the boundary between her dreams and reality blurs. Items from her nightmares (such as an old doll, a cracked mirror, and a crimson scarf) appear in real life.

Divya's investigation, reluctantly supported by her skeptical husband, leads her to uncover a dark family secret spanning generations, involving betrayal, revenge, and a vengeful spirit trapped in a cycle of violence. She ultimately realizes that the 13-year-old girl from her visions is connected to her own past, and the murders may have a chilling link to her family.

Divya's real name was Dharshini. She lived in the bungalow with her parents, Krishna and Jagamma (a bold woman in her village), and her brother. Jaggamma had a brother named Murugan. One Day, Dharshini was alone at home with her brother. In that gap, Murugan tried to steal money from their house, but he accidentally killed Dharshini's brother. Jagamma tries to attack Murugan with a broken glass piece, but Murugan defends himself, and Jagamma accidentally slits her own throat and dies. Murugan takes a needle to kill Dharshini, but at that time Krishna enters the house. Murugan pushes Krishna and Dharshini down the stairs, leading to Krishna's death. Because of that fall, Dharshini forgets the past and now lives as Divya.

After knowing this flashback, Divya plans to take revenge. She goes to Murugan's home and kills him. Divya, Naveen, and their son leave and start a new life.

== Cast ==
- Ritika Singh in a dual role as:
  - "Divya" alias Dharshini
  - Jaggamma (Dharshini's mother)
- Sriram as Naveen Naidu, a Navy captain
- Uttej as Ramachandra
- Subbaraju as Rudra, a psychiatrist
- Pharrnitha Rudra Raju as Divya and Naveen's son
- Keshav Deepak
- Siddharth Gollapudi

== Release and reception ==
Valari was released on 6 March 2024 on ETV Win.

BH Harsh of Cinema Express rated the film 3 out of 5 and quoted that the film is "compelling reimagining of the horror genre". Avad Mohammad of OTTPlay rated it 2.5 out of 5 and gave a mixed review citing it as "a non-routine thriller thats novel", appreciating the lead cast performances.
