= Bench Life =

- Promotional release poster
- Genre: Drama
- Written by: Manasa Sharma; Mahesh Uppala
- Directed by: Manasa Sharma
- Starring: Vaibhav; Charan Peri; Ritika Singh; Aakanksha Singh; Rajendra Prasad; Nayan Sarika; Venkatesh Kakumanu; Tanikella Bharani
- Music by: Pk Dandi
- Country of origin: India
- Original language: Telugu
- No. of episodes: 5

Production
- Executive producer: Ramesh Manyam
- Producer: Niharika Konidela
- Cinematography: Danush Bhaskar
- Editor: Prawin Pudi
- Camera setup: Multi-camera
- Running time: 39-42 mins
- Production company: Pink Elephant Pictures

Original release
- Network: SonyLIV
- Release: 12 September 2024

Bench Life is an Indian Telugu-language drama streaming television series written and directed by Manasa Sharma. Produced by Niharika Konidela under Pink Elephant Pictures, it stars Vaibhav, Charan Peri, Ritika Singh, Aakanksha Singh, Rajendra Prasad, Nayan Sarika, Venkatesh Kakumanu and Tanikella Bharani. The series premiered on SonyLIV on 12 September 2024.

== Cast ==
- Vaibhav as G. Balram "Balu"
- Charan Peri as Ravi Kumar
- Ritika Singh as Meenakshi Sharma
- Aakanksha Singh as Jagadiswari "Isha"
- Rajendra Prasad as Prasad, an ex-IPS officer; Isha's father
- Nayan Sarika as Gayathri, Ravi's wife
- Venkatesh Kakumanu as Kishore Kumar
- Sasha Singh as Monica, Kishore's colleague later wife.
- Tanikella Bharani as Ramanatham
- Tulasi as Meenakshi's mother
- Niharika Konidela as Pooja (Cameo Appearance).

== Production ==
The series was announced by Pink Elephant Pictures on SonyLIV. The trailer of the series was released on 26 August 2024.

== Reception ==
Satya Pulagam of ABP Desam awarded the series 3/5 stars. Avad Mohammad from OTTplay rated the series three-and-a-half out of five stars. Sruthi Ganapathy Raman from Scroll.in reviewed the series.
