= Gandeevam =

1994 Telugu film by Priyadarshan

- Theatrical release poster
- Directed by: Priyadarshan
- Written by: Satyanand (dialogues)
- Screenplay by: Priyadarshan
- Story by: V. M. C. Haneefa
- Produced by: Satyam Babu; Sampath Kumar
- Starring: Akkineni Nageswara Rao; Nandamuri Balakrishna; Roja
- Cinematography: S. Kumar
- Edited by: N. Gopalakrishnan
- Music by: M. M. Keeravani
- Production company: Sri Lakshmi Narasimha Combines
- Release date: 18 August 1994
- Running time: 154 minutes
- Country: India
- Language: Telugu

Gandeevam (transl. Bow of Arjuna) is a 1994 Indian Telugu-language action comedy film directed by Priyadarshan. Produced by Satyam Babu and Sampath Kumar, the film stars Akkineni Nageswara Rao, Nandamuri Balakrishna and Roja. The music for the film was composed by M. M. Keeravani. Malayalam superstar Mohanlal made a cameo appearance in the song "Goruvanka Vaalagane".

== Plot ==
Gandeevam follows Chakravarthy, a wealthy man who lives in solitude and regrets the loss of his pregnant wife, Parvati. Meanwhile, Michael, a gangster who holds a grudge against Chakravarthy for sending him to prison, learns that Chakravarthy has a son, Raja. Michael decides to manipulate Raja into seeking revenge on his father by convincing him that Chakravarthy abandoned his mother.

Raja, along with his fiancée Roja and friend Ram Babu, enters Chakravarthy's life, claiming to be his children and initially teasing him. As the story unfolds, Chakravarthy begins to develop affection for Raja and considers him as his heir. However, Raja betrays him, seizing his wealth with Roja's help. Parvati, upon realizing the truth, chastises Raja and recounts the events of the past.

Twenty years earlier, Chakravarthy and Parvati had worked for Michael. When Chakravarthy discovered Michael's illegal activities, he turned him in to the police. In retaliation, Michael framed Parvati, leading Chakravarthy to discard her. He later uncovers the truth, apprehends Michael, and rushes to Parvati, but it is too late.

Hearing this, Raja seeks his father's forgiveness. Just as he is about to reconcile, Roja is falsely accused of being killed by Chakravarthy. However, Raja uncovers that Roja is alive and in Michael’s custody. He rescues her and clears his father's name. The film concludes with the marriage of Raja and Roja, bringing the story to a happy resolution.

== Cast ==
- Akkineni Nageswara Rao as Chakravarthy
- Nandamuri Balakrishna as Raja
- Roja as Roja
- Brahmanandam as Bramam
- Nagesh as Idea Appa Rao
- Captain Raju as Michael
- Mukesh Rishi as Inspector Veeru Pentaiah
- Allu Ramalingaiah as Sarva Rayudu
- Chalapathi Rao as Hari Babu
- Giri Babu as Giri
- Ananth as Peon
- Jaya Bhaskar as Seshu
- Srividya as Parvathi
- Rupini as Rekha
- Swapna as Rani
- Y. Vijaya as Chakravarthy's sister
- Mohanlal as Boat Man in the song "Goruvanka Vaalagane" (cameo appearance)

== Music ==
Gandeevam

Soundtrack album by M. M. Keeravani
- Released: 1994
- Genre: Soundtrack
- Length: 28:02
- Label: Akash Audio
- Producer: M. M. Keeravani

M. M. Keeravani chronology
S. P. Parasuram (1994)	Gandeevam (1994)	Muddula Priyudu (1994)

The music for Gandeevam was composed by M. M. Keeravani. The song "Goruvanka Vaalagane," featuring a cameo by Malayalam superstar Mohanlal, is considered one of Keeravani's best compositions. In 2011, music director M. G. Sreekumar reused the same tune for the song "Gopabalanishtam" in the film Oru Marubhoomikkadha, which was also directed by Priyadarshan.

Track list
No.	Title	Lyrics	Singer(s)	Length
1.	"Goruvanka Vaalagane"	Veturi	S. P. Balasubrahmanyam, K. S. Chithra, M. G. Sreekumar	5:04
2.	"Hai Thisaade Debba"	Veturi	S. P. Balasubrahmanyam, K. S. Chithra	4:42
3.	"Chi Chi Paapa Chi"	Veturi	S. P. Balasubrahmanyam, K. S. Chithra	4:42
4.	"Mama Zabba Mama"	Veturi	S. P. Balasubrahmanyam, K. S. Chithra	5:59
5.	"Siri Siri Poola"	Veturi	S. P. Balasubrahmanyam, K. S. Chithra, M. M. Keeravaani	3:57
6.	"Thadi Gudi Mudi"	Sirivennela Seetharama Sastry	S. P. Balasubrahmanyam, K. S. Chithra	4:40
Total length:				28:54
