= Meri Awaz Ko Mil Gayi Roshni =

Indian musical drama series

- Genre: Drama
- Starring: Ashima Bhalla; Karan Grover
- Opening theme: "Meri Awaz Ko Mil Gayi Roshni" by Gayatri Iyer
- Country of origin: India
- No. of seasons: 1
- No. of episodes: 150

Production
- Running time: 22 minutes
- Production company: Fox Television Studio

Original release
- Network: STAR Plus
- Release: 23 April 2007 – 17 January 2008

Meri Awaz Ko Mil Gayi Roshni is an Indian musical drama (film and television)drama television series that aired on STAR Plus from 23 April 2007 to 17 January 2008. The series starred Ashima Bhalla, Saumya Tandon and Karan Grover.

== Plot ==
Meri Awaz Ko Mil Gayi Roshni is a story about Raj (Karan Grover) and Sudha's (Ashima Bhalla) love, and Sudha's desire to become a singer to fulfill her late mother's dreams. The show takes a 360 degrees when Raj's former employer takes a liking to him and does everything in her power to sabotage his relations with Sudha.

== Music and Lyrics ==
Nida Fazli has written seven songs for the serial. A "musical saga", the serial has scores by Pritam's erstwhile partner Jeet Ganguly. And the songs have been sung by Gayatri Iyer-Ganjawala, Mahalaxmi Iyer and Hamsika Iyer. Nida Fazli says that the "musical" serial has the "possibility for good lyrics" as it deals with human relations and clash of egos. And an understanding music director (Jeet) was a bonus. "I was given a free hand to give my kind of lyrics for the serial. I agreed to write its songs only after I was convinced that it had a good storyline. Deepak Segal (Fox Television Studios India country head), like his father (Mohan Segal) has a sense of good poetry," says Nida, lamenting that many of today's songs are "concocted wordings", which fail to find any connect with the storyline.

== Cast ==
- Ashima Bhalla ... Sudha Malik
- Karan Grover ... Raj Malik
- Saumya Tandon... Ria Sahani
- Salim Shah ... Vijayendra Malik
- Shama Deshpande ... Meenakshi Malik
- Manish Goel... Rehan Kapoor
- Sahil Chauhan... Ishaan
- Kishwer Merchant... Rama Chopra
- Jiten Lalwani... Prakash Chopra
- Ritu Chaudhary... Sunita Chopra
- Mihir Mishra... Rishi Oberoi
- Avinash Singh Chauhan... Pappu Singh
- Kulbir Baderson... Chachi Ji

== Production ==
The series was mainly filmed at SJ studio in Sakinaka, Mumbai.

The story is based on a real life character portrayed by Ashima Bhalla in the series as Sudha. Karan Grover while in Saarrthi bagged the lead role of Raj in 2007. Not being able to manage both, he quit the former series for this series for his character was killed in it.

In November 2007, Grover and Saumya Tandon playing Ria quit the series after which the series took a leap focussing on Bhalla's character.

This is the first Indian production of Fox Entertainment Group's Indian Subsidiary.

Initially aired at 9:00 pm (IST) slot, with the not expected ratings, in October 2007, it was replaced by Sapna Babul Ka... Bidaai and it shifted to 8:00 pm slot.
