= K. R. Nagarajan =

Indian businessman and industrialist

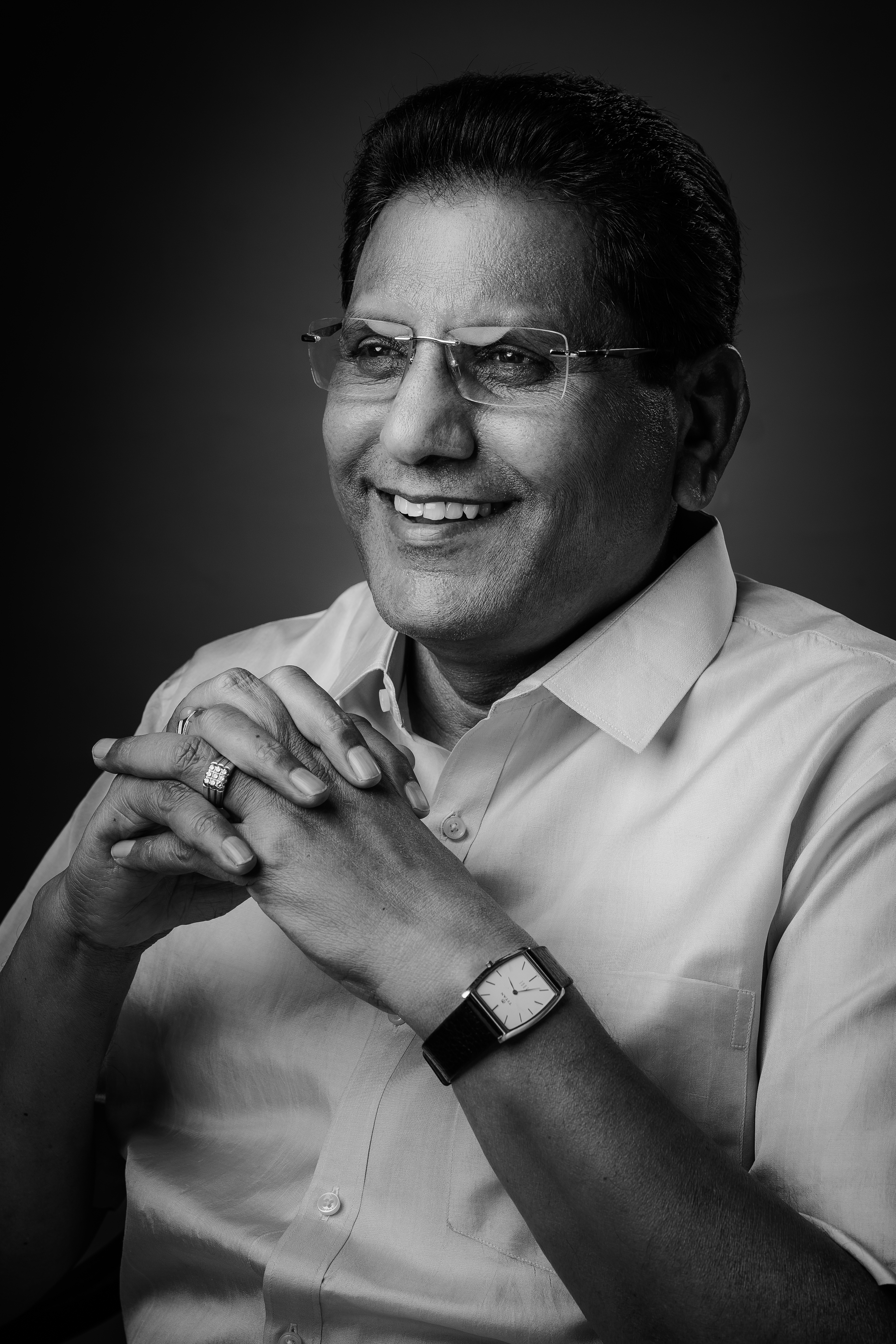

K. R. Nagarajan is an Indian businessman, philanthropist and industrialist. He is the founder and chairperson of the Ramraj Cotton. Under his leadership, Ramraj stepped into the textile business, predominantly selling white cotton shirts, lungis and dhotis. During his tenure, Ramraj Cotton had gained substantial market shares in the textile industry and gained a reputation as a market leader in the ethnic wear industry.

== Education ==
He completed his Secondary School Learning Certificate in 1977. However, the cost of higher education was prohibitive for his family, and he instead started working immediately.

== Career ==
K. R. Nagarajan spent an eighteen-month stint at a dhoti manufacturing firm in Tirupur to gain experience in production and marketing. He used this experience to set up his own small firm named "Ramraj Khadi Traders", combining his name and that of his father, Ramaswamy. At that time, the livelihoods of weavers living in Tirupur area made K. R. Nagarajan sympathise with them and he set up the firm to boost their incomeMore by selling dhoties. He laid the foundation for his dream venture, Ramraj Cotton, with the objective of articulating his keen interest in promoting dhoti, veshti, sarongs, and other Tamil traditional dress suits. He was inspired to establish a Tamil culture-oriented textile brand in order to promote ethnic wear based on his own personal life experiences.

As a young man, Nagaraj recalled a few anecdotes of being disrespected and discriminated against due to his choice of a traditional white shirt and dhoti over the Western office suits of his coworkers. In one case, he was stopped by a watchman from entering a hotel where he and his colleagues were to eat dinner; another example was when a receptionist didn't allow him into the boardroom until he verified his credentials. The memories he gathered on such humiliation and embarrassment, he transformed into a matter of showcasing respect and salute to Dhoti and Veshti by applying a paradigm shift approach with the focus on enhancing the brand value of his company. He compiled an anthem titled Salute Ramraj, and he brought prominent actors and celebrities on board to shoot advertisements to uplift his Ramraj brand with the Salute Ramraj theme being played in the background.

With the advent of his venture, Ramraj Cotton, K. R. Nagarajan aspired to inculcate the Tamil traditional aspects and traditions among the young generation, especially in his home state, Tamil Nadu. He realized that the positive attitude of youngsters in Tamil Nadu towards traditional clothes started diminishing, whereas the youngsters began showing enthusiasm for wearing western-styled clothes. Hence he brought innovative marketing ideas including Ottikko Kattikko pasting dhoties for the convenience of boys and men. His "kattikko illa ottikko" promotional marketing campaign turned out to be a redemption arc in getting the younger generation in Tamil Nadu to adapt to the Tamil cultural norms.

He also published a monthly magazine titled Venmai Ennangal about contemporary social issues.
