= InCar =

- Directed by: Harsh Warrdhan
- Screenplay by: Harsh Warrdhan
- Story by: Harsh Warrdhan
- Dialogue by: Sudhir Kumar; Harsh Warrdhan
- Produced by: Anjum Qureshi; Sajid Qureshi
- Starring: Ritika Singh; Manish Jhanjholia; Sandeep Goyat
- Cinematography: Mithun Gangopadhyay
- Edited by: Manik Dawar
- Music by: Mathias Duplessy
- Distributed by: INBOX pictures
- Release date: 3 March 2023
- Running time: 106 minutes
- Country: India
- Language: Hindi

InCar (transl. Dissent) is a 2023 Indian Hindi-language road crime film written and directed by Harsh Warrdhan. Inspired by true events, it stars Ritika Singh, Manish Jhanjholia and Richie Sandeep Goyat. Upon release InCar received positive reviews.

== Plot ==
The film deals with three remorseless kidnappers who sprung out of prison: Richie, his elder brother Yash, and their uncle, who hijack a car and its driver on a busy Delhi highway. The trio kidnap a college student, Sakshi, waiting near a bus station. The group threatens, blackmails, molests, and gang-rapes Sakshi in the moving car and take her to a remote hideout where they attempt to kill her. Sakshi retaliates and kills the trio with the help of the driver. The film depicts the lack of road safety to women in India.

== Cast ==
- Ritika Singh as Sakshi Gulati
- Manish Jhanjholia as Richie
- Sandeep Goyat as Yash
- Sunil Soni as Mama
- Gyan Prakash as car owner / driver
- Samsher Singh Sam as guy at petrol pump

== Critical reception ==
Punjab Kesari gave 3.5 out of 5 ratings, ABP News gave 1.5 out of 5 ratings and Grace Cyril of India Today gave 3 out of 5 ratings.

Nandini Ramnath of Scroll.in wrote it as "An exploitative nightmare on wheels".
