= Ramraj Cotton =

Indian ethnic wear brand

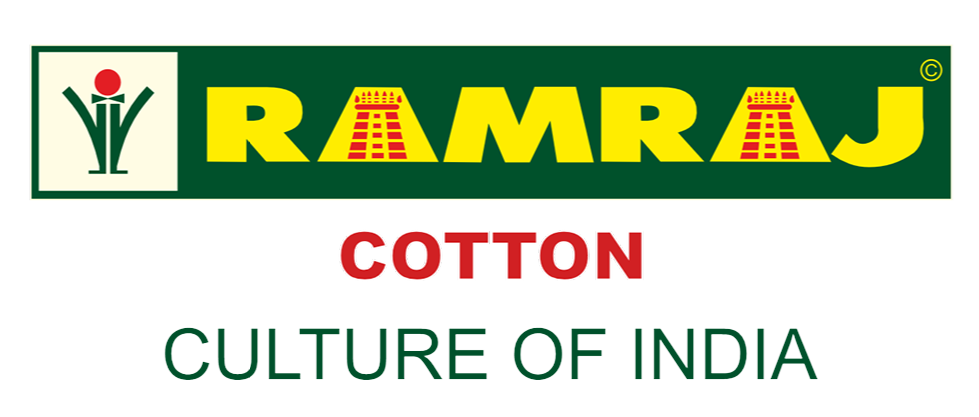

Ramraj Cotton is an Indian ethnic wear brand and it is a brainchild of K. R. Nagarajan. Ramraj stepped into the textile business, predominantly selling white cotton shirts and dhotis. Ramraj Cotton has gained substantial market shares in the textile industry and gained a reputation as a market leader in the ethnic wear industry. Ramraj has been reportedly manufacturing about 4000 unique varieties of dhotis. The popularity of the Ramraj brand which was solely due to its concept focusing on ethnic wear also paved the way for other brands such as Mister White, MCR to jump bandwagon. The Ramraj Cotton company exports textile materials to Sri Lanka, Singapore and Malaysia.

== Corporate history ==
=== Early years ===
Ramraj Cotton was established initially as a small office in Tirupur in 1983 under the name Ramraj Khadi Traders by K. R. Nagarajan, with a vision to popularise traditional Indian attire dhotis. Ramraj Khadi Traders began its operations with a table and a chair as the only furniture items. It was revealed that the precarious situation pertaining to the livelihoods of weavers living in Tirupur area made K. R. Nagarajan sympathise with them and as a result, he began the Ramraj Khadi Traders to help the weavers through the revenue earned by selling dhoties. K. R. Nagarajan named the company "Ramraj" using the letters that appear in both his name (Nagarajan) and his father's name (Ramaswamy) and with the tagline in Tamil “paarambariya naagareegam pudhiya polivuden” (traditional fashion with a new twist).

Ramraj Khadi Traders was later rebranded and renamed as Ramraj Cotton in 1987, when cotton replaced the use of khadi in the company, with the brand focussing on premium cotton fabrics.

Between 1989 and 1994, they expanded their product line to include white shirts, innerwear, and various other men's wear clothing. In 1999, the brand opened their first exclusive showroom in Tirupur, Tamil Nadu.

Prior to the “Salute Ramraj” campaign 2001, the brand had opened exclusive showrooms in multiple locations across South India.

=== Salute Ramraj ===
K. R. Nagarajan initiated the concept of Salute Ramraj, and he brought prominent actors and celebrities including Malayalam actor Jayaram, Telugu actor Rana Daggubati as well as veteran Telugu actor Venkatesh Daggubati as brand ambassadors on board to shoot advertisements for his Ramraj branded clothing traditional attire with the Salute Ramraj theme being played in the background. The underlying core principles behind the incorporation of Salute Ramraj anthem is based on the personal setback of its founder K. R. Nagarajan who was once denied entry to a five-star hotel due to his ethnic wear. Nagarajan's thought process focused on ensuring that Ramraj Cotton stuck to its basic instincts on elevating the status of the dhotis and veshtis to a level of cultural pride. Over the years, with the marketing strategies of Ramraj, the public perception turned out to be positive towards dhotis.

=== Other Brands ===
By 2013, the brand began exporting to International markets like Malaysia, USA and Singapore, with sub brands like “Little Stars” for kids, “Linen Park” for linen shirts, “Genxt” for adjustable dhoti, and “Lagnaa” for pure silk fabrics.

In 2015, Ramraj introduced pocket dhotis to cater to the requirements of men in order to keep their belongings, such as purses, mobile phones and handkerchiefs, in their pockets conveniently and to ease portability concerns. Similarly, Ramraj Cotton began producing velcro dhotis specifically for kids with the added feature of small pockets. As of 2017, the Ramraj Cotton company owned 3 production facilities in Tamil Nadu, with over 82 exclusive outlets and 6,000 multi-brand outlets in across the territories of South Indian region.

In 2019, Ramraj launched their e-commerce platform for worldwide online ordering.

Later, Ramraj Cotton introduced Ottikko Kattikko Adjustable dhotis for the convenience of men. Ramraj also produced a commercial advertisement with a promotional tagline "kattikko illa ottikko" (tie it or just stick it) specifically targeting kids with the aim of ensuring user-friendly mechanism.

By 2020, the brand had expanded into women's wear and kid's clothing with their sub-brand “Ramyyam”.

In September 2021, the company marked the occasion of centennial year of Mahatma Gandhi's historic attire change by staging a special event under the theme "Gandhiya Dhoti Centennial Celebration".

In 2023, veteran actor Venkatesh Daggubati inaugurated their 250th store in the country, in Vijaywada.

In 2025, Ramraj launched a new campaign in collaboration with Abhishek Bachchan and Chennaiyin FC.

=== Sustainability Initiatives ===
Over the last few years, Ramraj Cotton has pledged to taking steps towards sustainable fashion, integrating eco-friendly practices into its manufacturing processes.

Currently, the brand has its presence in over 13+ countries including Malaysia, Singapore, Sri Lanka, Saudi Arabia, United Arab Emirates, Kuwait, Oman, United Kingdom, Canada, Australia, United States and Myanmar, with over 300+ stores across India.

== Endorsements ==
In 2019, Indian prime minister Narendra Modi wore a Ramraj Cotton-branded dhoti during a high-profile meeting with general secretary of the Chinese Communist Party Xi Jinping at Mamallapuram, and Modi's adaptability to the South Indian Tamil traditional ethnic wear eventually put the brand under the national spotlight, and the moment also gained international recognition afterwards.

In 2022, Narendra Modi also wore the traditional Ramraj-branded dhotis during the inauguration of the 44th Chess Olympiad which was held in Chennai. In January 2024, Ramraj announced Kannada actor Rishab Shetty as its brand ambassador. In 2024, Ramraj announced a partnership with Chennaiyin FC club as its presenting sponsor for the Indian Super League.

Ramraj Cotton conducted a fashion show to portray the models wearing the signature white shirt and dhoti costumes. In 2009, the Federation of Tamil Sangams of North America (FeTNA) in Atlanta brought on board approximately 700 men and women, where men and women gathered in large numbers to dress themselves in Ramraj-branded dhotis, salwars, as well as in sarees. Since around 2010, Jayaram worked as the brand ambassador. In 2016, Telugu actor Venkatesh was roped in as the brand ambassador of the company and he opened Ramaraj Cotton's Ameerpet branch in Telangana. In 2021, Ramesh Aravind was roped in as the brand ambassador.
