= Ilaignan =

2011 film by Suresh Krissna

- Poster
- Directed by: Suresh Krishna
- Screenplay by: M. Karunanidhi
- Based on: Mother by Maxim Gorky
- Produced by: S. Martin
- Starring: Pa. Vijay; Meera Jasmine; Remya Nambeeshan; Suman; Khushbu Sundar; Namitha
- Cinematography: B. L. Sanjay
- Edited by: V. T. Vijayan
- Music by: Vidyasagar
- Production company: Martin Productions
- Release date: 14 January 2011
- Country: India
- Language: Tamil

Ilaignan (transl. Youth) is a 2011 Indian Tamil-language historical action film directed by Suresh Krissna, who directs his 50th film, and written by DMK Chief and the then Chief Minister of Tamil Nadu M. Karunanidhi, his 75th film and based on the 1906 Russian novel, Mother, by Maxim Gorky. It was originally titled Thai Kaviyam.

== Plot ==
Karky (Pa. Vijay) is the son of Arokkyasami (Nassar), who wants to win freedom of his people from the shipbuilding owner Rajanayagam (Suman) and his wife Sena (Namitha). Meera (Meera Jasmine) is Rajanayagam's sister. She is a very kindhearted woman who helps Karky. With Meera's help, Karky starts a war against Rajanayagam. Rajayanagam is not only cruel and stone-hearted, but also very cunning and a big fraud. He and his wife play a cunning game and cheat Karky. Karky's mother Valliammai (Khushbu) is initially reluctant to wage war against evil openly as she is afraid of bloodshed. She wanted all workers to live and not die. Rajanayagam crosses all the levels of cruelty. There is no way the situation can be handled peacefully, so Valliammai asks Karky to open a full-fledged war against evil. Then the final war starts between good and evil in which good wins over evil.

== Cast ==
- Pa. Vijay as Karky Arokkyasamy
- Meera Jasmine as Meera Deivanayagam
- Remya Nambeesan as Ramya Chettiar
- Suman as Rajanayagam
- Namitha as Sena
- Nassar as Arokkyasami
- Vadivelu as Isaac Arumugam
- Karunas as Chembian
- Khushbu as Valliammai
- Sarath Babu as Deivanayagam
- Y. Gee. Mahendra as Chettiar
- Rajendran as Kaalia
- Manivannan as Laborer
- Delhi Ganesh as Karky's uncle
- Nizhalgal Ravi
- Rajkapoor as Laborer
- Ilavarasu as Laborer
- Bala Singh as Laborer
- Alex
- Thennavan
- Thyagu
- Kavithalaya Krishnan
- K. Natraj
- Crane Manohar as Isaac's assistant
- Krishnamoorthy
- Vengal Rao as Isaac's assistant
- Bava Lakshmanan

== Soundtrack ==
The soundtrack has 5 songs composed by Vidyasagar and lyrics written by Pa. Vijay.

- "Mazhayil Kulitha" – Karthik, Anweshaa
- "Imaithoodhane" – Chinmayi
- "Neeya Neeya" – Tippu
- "Oru Nila" – Karthik, Shreya Ghoshal
- "Thozha Vaanam" – Hariharan

== Reception ==
Sify wrote "The film is made like an old fashioned steamy tear jerker where good triumphs over evil in the last reel. Characters and milieu look early 20th century, they speak loudly as though they are on a stage without mikes". The Times of India wrote "It is very obvious that a lot of money has been pumped into the venture, but the archaic writing and hackneyed situations never allow ‘Ilaignan’ to grow among the audience and bloom into youth". The New Indian Express wrote "'Illaignan' is neither a seriously meaningful film, nor an engrossing commercial entertainer although the script boasts of a good potential".
