= Love (1991 Indian film) =

1991 Hindi film by Suresh Krissna

- Theatrical release poster
- Directed by: Suresh Krissna
- Written by: Suresh Krissna
- Based on: Prema (Telugu)
- Produced by: Shyam Bajaj
- Starring: Salman Khan; Revathi
- Cinematography: S. M. Anwar
- Edited by: M. S. Shinde
- Music by: Anand-Milind; Ilaiyaraaja (unc.)
- Release date: 15 November 1991
- Running time: 153 minutes
- Country: India
- Language: Hindi

Love is a 1991 Indian Hindi-language romance film directed by Suresh Krissna, starring Salman Khan and Revathi (in her Hindi debut) in the lead roles. It is the remake of Suresh Krissna's Telugu film Prema (1989). It could not repeat the original's success and ended up as an average grosser. The makers changed the tragic climax from the original film to a happy ending. This movie is also remembered for the romantic song "Saathiya Tune Kya Kiya."

== Plot ==
Jailed as a juvenile for killing his abusive father (Sudhir Kumar), who is responsible for his mother's suicide, Prithvi (Salman Khan) is unable to stand any atrocity. He meets Maggie Pinto (Revathi Menon) and after a few chance meetings, they fall in love. Maggie takes Prithvi to meet her parents, but they reject him after learning about his criminal past. When Maggie and Prithvi persist, Maggie's mother, Stella Pinto (Rita Bhaduri), calls the police and has Prithvi jailed. Guruji (Amjad Khan) comes to Prithvi's aid and bails him out. Prithvi and Maggie continue their courtship, but Stella finds out and intervenes, sending goons to attack Prithvi, during which Maggie is injured. How this affects everyone close to her is the crux of the story.

== Cast ==
- Salman Khan as Prithvi Pandith
- Revathi as Maggie Pinto
- Amjad Khan aa Guruji
- Babloo Mukherjee as Prithvi's Friend
- Shafi Inamdar as John Pinto
- Rita Bhaduri as Stella Pinto
- Suhas Joshi as Prithvi's mother
- Sudhir as Prithvi's Father

== Soundtrack ==
Love

Soundtrack album by Anand–Milind
- Released: 1991
- Genre: Feature film soundtrack
- Label: Venus Records & Tapes
- Producer: Anand–Milind

Anand–Milind chronology
Lahu Luhan (1991)	Love (1991)	Mohabbat Mohabbatein (1991)

The songs are based on the original music composed by Ilaiyaraaja for the Telugu movie Prema. It was released on Venus Records & Tapes, and composed by Anand–Milind and lyrics by Majrooh Sultanpuri.

Song	Singer	Raga
"Aayi Bahar"	Sapna Mukherjee	
"I Am Sorry"	S. P. Balasubrahmanyam	
"My Love, Meri Priyatama"	S. P. Balasubrahmanyam, K. S. Chitra	
"We Are Made For Each Other"	S. P. Balasubrahmanyam, K. S. Chitra	
"Aaja Aaja, Give Me A Kiss"	S. P. Balasubrahmanyam, K. S. Chitra	
"Saathiya, Tune Kya Kiya"	S. P. Balasubrahmanyam, K. S. Chitra	Yaman Kalyan
