= Neevevaro =

2018 Telugu-language Indian film

- Theatrical release poster
- Directed by: Hari Nath
- Written by: Kona Venkat
- Story by: Rohin Venkatesan
- Produced by: M. V. V. Satyanarayana
- Starring: Aadhi Pinisetty; Taapsee Pannu; Ritika Singh
- Cinematography: Sai Sriram
- Edited by: Pradeep E. Ragav
- Music by: Achu Rajamani; Prasan Praveen Shyam
- Production company: M. V. V. Cinema
- Release date: 23 August 2018
- Running time: 122 minutes
- Country: India
- Language: Telugu

Neevevaro (transl. Who are you?) is a 2018 Telugu language romantic action thriller film directed by Hari Nath and produced by Kona Venkat and M.V.V. Satyanarayana. The film stars Aadhi Pinisetty, Taapsee Pannu and Ritika Singh. This film is a remake of the 2017 Tamil film Adhe Kangal, directed by Rohin Venkatesan.

== Plot ==
Kalyan (Aadhi Pinisetty), a blind chef, owns a successful restaurant in Hyderabad. He is well-respected and has a loving family. His childhood friend and neighbor, Anu (Ritika Singh), is in love with him. Kalyan enjoys playing the guitar in his restaurant after hours and walks home at night. One evening, Vennela (Taapsee Pannu) arrives at his restaurant, asking for help to feed a homeless person. Kalyan is impressed and, as Vennela becomes a regular visitor, he gradually falls in love with her.

Kalyan proposes to Vennela, but she tearfully explains that while she loves him, she must leave. She had borrowed ₹20 lakh for her father's heart surgery from a gang, and now she cannot repay it. The gang has threatened to abduct her if she fails to repay the debt by the next day. Kalyan, in love, agrees to repay her debt.

On his way home, Kalyan is involved in a car accident, leaving him unconscious for three weeks but restoring his sight. Upon waking, he learns that three weeks have passed, and Vennela could be in danger. He searches for her but finds nothing. Meanwhile, Kalyan's and Anu's parents arrange their marriage. To please his mother, Kalyan agrees to marry Anu, although he still loves Vennela. The night before the wedding, Vennela's father (D. S. Deekshithulu) visits Kalyan's restaurant, pleading for help as Vennela has been abducted due to the unpaid debt. Kalyan agrees to repay the money again.

The next day, Kalyan escapes his wedding to save Vennela. He and Vennela's father arrive at the appointed place, where they find the gang holding a gun to Vennela. After Kalyan hands over the money, the police arrive, enraging the gang. They shoot Vennela's father, beat Kalyan unconscious, and take Vennela away, warning Kalyan to stay silent. Kalyan wakes up alone, confused, with no trace of the incident.

Returning to the wedding, Anu realizes Kalyan only agreed to marry her out of obligation. She starts to resent him. Kalyan sees news of Vennela's father dying in a car accident in Vizag. Confused, he visits Vizag to investigate. Anu also travels there for work. With the help of Constable Chokka Rao (Vennela Kishore), Kalyan finds Vamsi (Adarsh Balakrishna), a blind clay artist whose car was involved in the accident. Vamsi reveals that his girlfriend Jyothi, an NRI, drove his car and killed the old man. Vamsi bribed an inspector to cover it up, but Jyothi fled. A photo of Jyothi shocks everyone, as it is Vennela.

Kalyan realizes that Vennela is a con artist targeting blind men who received a state award for the specially-abled, like himself and Vamsi. He teams up with Anu and Chokka to catch her. It is revealed that Vennela, whose real name is Kalavathi, left Kalyan after his accident, continuing her cons. Betrayed by her partners, she takes control of the gang and kills her accomplice, disguised as Jyothi, in a staged accident.

Finally, they catch Kalavathi while she is conning another blind man, Shekar (Ravi Prakash), a classical singer in Vijayawada, under the guise of needing money for a kidney transplant. Despite her attempts to mislead them, she is arrested. In court, it is revealed that Kalavathi is a child abuse victim turned fraudster. She is found guilty but mentally ill, sentenced to three years in jail, and sent to a mental hospital.

Chokka Rao is promoted to Sub-Inspector, and Kalyan and Anu reunite after Kalyan realizes her true love for him. The film ends with a twist: Kalavathi is not mentally ill and is waiting for a chance to restart her fraudulent ways.

== Cast ==
- Aadhi Pinisetty as Kalyan, a blind Chef
- Taapsee Pannu as Kalavathi/Vennela/Jyothsna/Shruthi/Katyayani
- Ritika Singh as Anu
- Vennela Kishore as Constable Chokka Rao, later promoted to Sub-Inspector
- Tulasi as Kalyan's mother
- Sivaji Raja as Kalyan's father
- Aadarsh Balakrishna as Vamsi, a blind sculptor
- Srikanth Iyyengar as Anu's father
- Satya Krishnan as Anu's mother
- Saptagiri as "Janaganamana" Jagadish, an ethical hacker and a staunch patriot.
- Viva Harsha as Kalyan's friend
- Sivannarayana Naripeddi as Hotel Manager Krishna
- Ravi Prakash as Shekar, a blind Classical singer
- Satish Saripalli as Kalavathi's close confident.
- D. S. Deekshithulu as Kalavathi's partner in crime.
- Nani (cameo role) as a customer in the end

== Soundtrack ==
Neevevaro

Soundtrack album by Achu Rajamani
- Released: 20 August 2018
- Recorded: 2018
- Genre: Soundtrack
- Length: 17:00
- Label: Mango Music
- Producers: Achu & Prasan

Achu Rajamani chronology
Goli Soda 2 (2018)	Neevevaro (2018)	Basmati Blues (2018)

Official audio
- Neevevaro Songs Jukebox with Lyrics on YouTube

Music is composed by Achu Rajamani and Prasan.

Track list
No.	Title	Lyrics	Music	Singer(s)	Length
1.	"Rakshasi Rakshasi"	Bhaskarabhatla	Achu Rajamani	Achu Rajamani
2.	"Vennela O Vennela"	Srijo	Prasan	Sid Sriram	4:26
3.	"Oh Cheli"	Balaji	Achu Rajamani	Kaala Bhairava	4:12
4.	"Yento Ila"	Bhaskarabhatla	Prasan	Vandana Srinivasan
Total length:					17:00

== Reception ==
=== Critical reception ===
The Times of India gave 3 out of 5 stars stating "Neevevaro isn't a lazy film by any means, just that the proceedings could have been better than a one-time watch.".

IndiaGlitz gave 2 out of 5 stars stating "'Neevevaro' doesn't have edge-of-the-seat moments. There is a lack of urgency in the proceedings".

Hindustan Times gave 2 out of 5 stars stating "Neevevaro is a watered down version of a suspense thriller, with Vennela Kishore saving the day with his humour towards the end".
