= Jyeshta (film) =

- VCD cover
- Directed by: Suresh Krissna
- Written by: B A Madhu (dialogue)
- Screenplay by: Suresh Krissna
- Story by: Ranjith
- Produced by: D. Kamalakar; M. B. Babu
- Starring: Vishnuvardhan; Ashima Bhalla; Devaraj
- Narrated by: Sudeep
- Cinematography: Ramesh Babu
- Edited by: Shyam Yadav
- Music by: S. A. Rajkumar
- Production company: Sri Lakshmi Ganapathi Productions
- Release date: 17 December 2004
- Running time: 135 minutes
- Country: India
- Language: Kannada

Jyeshta is a 2004 Indian Kannada-language drama film starring Vishnuvardhan, Ashima Bhalla and Devaraj. The film is a remake of the Malayalam film Valliettan (2000), is directed and written by director Suresh Krissna and features soundtrack from S. A. Rajkumar. The original version was directed by Shaji Kailas and featured Mammootty and Shobhana in lead roles.

Released on 17 December 2004, the film met with average and critical response at the box-office.

== Cast ==
- Vishnuvardhan as Vishnu "Jyeshta"
- Ashima Bhalla as Kanchana, Vishnu’s wife
- Devaraj as Devu, Vishnu’s younger brother
- Aniruddh as Ani, Vishnu’s adopted brother
- Sourav as Sourav, Vishnu’s younger brother
- Master Anand as Anand, Vishnu’s youngest brother
- K. S. L. Swamy as Nanjegowda
- Sindhu Menon as Gowri
- Ramesh Bhat as Ramanna
- Sharath Lohitashwa as Bhadra
- Nawab Shah
- M. N. Lakshmi Devi as Kanchana's grandmother
- Tara as Bhadra's wife
- Avinash as DySP Pradeep Kumar
- Rangayana Raghu
- Shobharaj as Aadi, Gowri’s brother
- Master Karthik
- Sudeep as narrator

== Production ==
As of October 2004, the film was complete except for two songs and Vishnuvardhan started dubbing for the film.

== Soundtrack ==
All the songs are composed and scored by S. A. Rajkumar.

Sl No	Song title	Singer(s)	Lyrics
1	"Naaleya Nambikeyu"	K. S. Chithra	K. Kalyan
2	"Mannigu Manujanigu"	S. P. Balasubrahmanyam	K. Kalyan
3	"O Kanchana"	Rajesh Krishnan, K. S. Chithra	K. Kalyan
4	"Nennegala Nenapugale"	Rajesh Krishnan	K. Kalyan
5	"Lolakku Jhumiki"	Rajesh Krishnan, Karthik, Kalpana	K. Kalyan
6	"Nennegala Nenapugale"	Srinivas	K. Kalyan
7	"Khalaas Hudugi"	Malathi	K. Kalyan

== Reception ==
S. N. Deepak of Deccan Herald wrote "The film has all the essential elements, an item song and comedy scenes, but it lacks depth as the director tries to cram in everything and also episodes that glorify the ‘Jyeshta’".
