= Daddy (2001 film) =

2001 Indian film by Suresh Krissna

- Theatrical poster
- Directed by: Suresh Krissna
- Written by: Satyanand (dialogues)
- Screenplay by: Suresh Krissna
- Story by: Bhupathi Raja
- Produced by: Allu Aravind
- Starring: Chiranjeevi; Simran; Rajendra Prasad; Ashima Bhalla
- Cinematography: Chota K. Naidu
- Edited by: Marthand K. Venkatesh
- Music by: S.A. Rajkumar
- Production company: Geetha Arts
- Release date: 4 October 2001
- Running time: 156 mins
- Country: India
- Language: Telugu

Daddy is a 2001 Indian Telugu-language family drama film directed by Suresh Krissna. It stars Chiranjeevi, Simran, and Ashima Bhalla, with music composed by S. A. Rajkumar. The film was produced by Allu Aravind under the Geetha Arts banner. The film was dubbed into Tamil and Hindi as Dance Master (2003) and Meri Izzat (2008), respectively.

== Plot ==
Raj Kumar or Raj (Chiranjeevi) is a rich audio company owner who owns a modern dance school. Dance is his passion and his life until he meets and marries Shanti (Simran). They have a daughter Akshaya (Anushka Malhotra). Raj believes in his friends and does anything for them. However, they take advantage of him and usurp his wealth. Though Raj and his family are happy in their not-so-lavish lifestyle, their happiness is shattered when Akshaya becomes ill with a heart condition. Raj, instead of bringing the money Shanti had stored in the bank to the hospital to save Akshaya, uses it to save his former dance student Gopi (Allu Arjun), who was hit by a car. Shanti, who is pregnant, leaves him because she feels that he killed their daughter.

Six years later, Raj, who is once again wealthy, sees his second child, Aishwarya, who looks exactly like his Akshaya, in whose honor he builds a foundation which takes care of poor, unhealthy children and their families. He builds a relationship with Aishwarya without Shanti's knowledge. However, Shanti finds out, tries to reconcile with him after realizing her mistake, but doesn't because she sees him with the same friend who took advantage of them earlier. Raj agrees to leave, says a final goodbye, and as he is about to leave, sees his child caught in an accidental fire at her school function. He saves her, but he is wounded. Shanti sees how much he loves her and Aishwarya, and they finally reunite.

== Cast ==
- Chiranjeevi as Raj Kumar / Raj
- Simran as Shanti
- Anushka Malhotra as Akshaya / "Aish" Aishwarya
- Ashima Bhalla as Priya
- Rajendra Prasad as Prasad
- Sarath Babu as doctor
- Kota Srinivasa Rao as Shanti's paternal uncle
- Achyuth as Ramesh
- M. S. Narayana as Priya's father
- Uttej as Priya's friend
- Rathan Mouli as Doctor
- Allu Arjun as Gopi Krishna (in a cameo appearance)

== Production ==
The second schedule had scenes shot at a private home at Banjara Hills, Hyderabad. Two of the fight sequences were choreographed by Pawan Kalyan. Saroj Khan choreographed four songs "Aadu Aadinchu", "Mandara Bugguloki", "Naa Pranama" and "Patta Pakkinti". A couple of songs were shot in Vienna and Austria while the song "Vaana Vaana" was shot at 2nd floor of Annapurna Studios.

== Soundtrack ==
Daddy

Soundtrack album by S. A. Rajkumar
- Released: 14 September 2001
- Recorded: 2001
- Genre: Film soundtrack
- Length: 30:56
- Label: Aditya Music
- Producer: S. A. Rajkumar

S. A. Rajkumar chronology
Nee Premakai (2001)	Daddy (2001)	Siva Rama Raju (2001)

Music was composed by S. A. Rajkumar and the lyrics were provided by Chandrabose, Sirivennela Sitarama Sastry, Bhuvanachandra and Srinivas. The audio was released on 14 September 2001. The fans of Chiranjeevi all over the state organized the audio release of the film and they selected the district headquarters as the venues and invited the top-rank government officials and politicians.

#	Title	Singers	Lyrics	Length
1	"Aadu Aadinchu"	Shankar Mahadevan	Chandrabose	05:19
2	"Mandhaara Buggalloki"	Udit Narayan, Kavita Krishnamurti	Srinivas	04:53
3	"Vaana Vaana"	K. S. Chithra, Udit Narayan, Baby Vaishali	Chandrabose	05:16
4	"Gummaadi Gummaadi"	Hariharan	Sirivennela Sitaramasastri	04:52
5	"Naa Praanama"	K. S. Chithra, Udit Narayan	Sirivennela Sitaramasastri	04:56
6	"Patta Pakkinti"	S.P. Balu, Kavita Krishnamurti, Anuradha Sriram	Bhuvanachandra	05:10
7	"Gummaadi"(Version ll)	Rajesh Krishnan	Sirivennela Sitaramasastri	
8	"Dooranga Poke"	S.P. Balu	Sirivennela Sitaramasastri	

== Reception ==
Sify wrote "Chiranjeevi looks jaded, as he has to carry this weak script on his shoulders. Simran sleepwalks through the film and Rajendra Prasad has nothing much to do. Suresh Krishna with a half-baked story has messed up the film. The music of S.A.Rajkumar is stale and there is nothing new in Raju Sundaram’s choreography. On the whole even Chiru fans will not digest Daddy. The film lacks emotional fizz". Andhra Today wrote "Chiranjeevi's fans may get disappointed by the film that projects him from an angle quite contrary to his known image. The sentiment may appeal to the female audience, and thus, might prove a hit for Chiranjeevi. Credit must go to the director for the variety in the story, especially, the sentimental scenes are handled very sensitively and move people to tears. The only shortcoming of the movie is the lack of entertainment". Telugu Cinema wrote "This family drama with child sentiment lacks either the proper build up in the sequnce of the events or emotional grip in the story. With no humour to give relief the film takes on nerves. Of course there are a couple of scenes both in a side comedy track and by the hero meant for humour, which failed utterly".

== Box office ==
Daddy completed 50 days in 97 centres and 100 days in 15 centres. It was dubbed in Hindi as Meri Izzat and in Tamil as Dance Master .

== Awards ==
- Nandi Award for Best Art Director – K. Ashok
