= Sudesi =

- Theatrical release poster
- Directed by: Jeppy A. Y
- Written by: Jeppy A. Y.
- Produced by: L. K. Sudhish
- Starring: Vijayakanth; Ashima Bhalla
- Cinematography: Kichas
- Edited by: K. R. Gowrishankar
- Music by: Srikanth Deva
- Production company: Captain Cine Creations
- Release date: 10 March 2006
- Running time: 152 minutes
- Country: India
- Language: Tamil

Sudesi (/suˈðeɪsi/) is a 2006 Indian Tamil-language political action film directed by Jeppy A. Y. It stars Vijayakanth and Ashima Bhalla, while Sayaji Shinde, Karunas, and Manoj K. Jayan play supporting roles. The music was composed by Srikanth Deva with cinematography by Kichas and editing by K. R. Gowrishankar. The film was released on 10 March 2006.

== Plot ==
After the death of the Chief Minister of Tamil Nadu Ganapathy (V. S. Raghavan), the ruling party chooses Narayanan (Sayaji Shinde), a corrupt politician and ex-rowdy, as their new party leader and the Chief Minister of Tamil Nadu. Ponnusamy (Alex), a party member who wants to become the chief minister, tries to stop it, but Narayanan plants a bomb in his car and Ponnusamy dies. Narayanan's right-hand man is Raghavachari (Krishna), who advises him on all matters, whereas the minister Ramasamy (Livingston) hates Ragavachari and wants to become Narayanan's right-hand man.

Sudesi (Vijayakanth) is a jobless man who has a master's degree in political science and lives with his mother (Sangeetha) in the city. For the village festival, Sudesi returns to his village, and his relative Selvi (Ashima Bhalla), who loves him, tries to win his heart. Back in the city, Sudesi's servant Kamala (Kalairani) informs Sudesi that her son Ganesh (Master Karthik) went missing, and his dead body is later found in a drain by the police. Sudesi finds out the culprit: a school teacher (Thalaivasal Vijay). That day, the teacher sent Ganesh to his house for doing housework. At the police station, the police inspector (Mansoor Ali Khan) promises Sudesi that the teacher will be in jail for a long time. Later that day, the police inspector Sudesi receives bribes from the school teacher, and Sudesi takes the issue to the court.

One day, a beggar steals the handbag of Raghavachari's mistress Shruti (Shruti Malhotra) on the street, and Sudesi goes after him. Raghavachari then kills Shruti for her inadvertence, while Sudesi brings the handbag to his house. With his henchmen, Raghavachari meets Sudesi in his house and plants a bomb to destroy all the evidence. The bomb explodes killing his mother, and an injured Sudesi is admitted to the hospital. At the hospital, Selvi brings him the handbag she had taken with her that day, and he finds a CD inside. Sudesi then absconds. The private detective Thilak (Manoj K. Jayan) is assigned by Raghavachari to find Sudesi and the CD.

Thilak eventually finds Sudesi, who shows him the video in the CD. The video shows Narayanan killing Ganapathy in the hospital, and it was Ragavachari who recorded it with a hidden camera to blackmail Narayanan later. Thilak surprisingly decides to support Sudesi. Sudesi and Thilak then kidnap Raghavachari. Sudesi starts to blackmail Narayanan using the CD and uses him effectively for the betterment of society. Narayanan gets praised by the public for his good work and wins the Legislative Assembly election hands down. Narayanan then thanks Sudesi for changing him into a good politician, and he continues his work under Sudesi's guidance.

== Cast ==
- Vijayakanth as Sudesi
- Ashima Bhalla as Selvi
- M. N. Nambiar as Sudesi's grandfather
- Sayaji Shinde as Chief Minister Asia Narayanan
- Karunas as Ramesh
- Livingston as Ramasamy
- Mansoor Ali Khan as Police inspector
- Manoj K. Jayan as Detective Thilak
- Costumes Krishna as Advisor Raghavachari
- Shruti Malhotra as Shruti
- Thalaivasal Vijay as Teacher
- Alex as Ponnusamy
- Ilavarasu as Parotta master
- Sangeetha as Sudesi's mother
- Kalairani as Kamala
- Srilatha as Professor's wife
- Vijay Krishnaraj as Collector
- Srikanth as Judge
- V. S. Raghavan as Former CM Ganapathy
- Besant Ravi as Naga
- Amjad Khan as Rowdy
- Halwa Vasu as Vasu
- Madhan Bob as Dr. Kannadasan
- Mayilsamy as Drunkard
- Muthukaalai as Beggar
- Nellai Siva as Pharmacist
- Bava Lakshmanan
- Krishnamoorthy as Villager
- Kottai Perumal as Swamy
- Master Karthik as Ganesh
- Baby Uma Rani as Professor's daughter
- Ajay Rathnam as Government Officer
- Vijay Easwaran as Eswaran
- Achamillai Gopi as Dr. Gopi
- Velmurugan as Villager
- Brinda Parekh in a special appearance

== Production ==
The first schedule started at Pollachi. The song "Karpooram Kaati" was shot with 400 junior artistes and 100 dancers.

== Soundtrack ==
Music was composed by Srikanth Deva.

Song name	Singers	Lyrics
"Nooru Kodi Minnal"	Vijay Yesudas, Shobana Sharmila	Neela Megam
"Kalyaana Kanavu"	P. Jayachandran, Swarnalatha	Nandalala
"Senthamil Naadu"	Saindhavi, Priya, Vidya	Neela Megam
"Raaviniley"	Ganga	Aasai Thambi
"Kaaya Pazamaa"	Malathy Lakshman	Viveka
"Karpooram Kaatti"	S. P. Balasubrahmanyam	Muthu Vijayan

== Critical reception ==
Lajjavathi of Kalki wrote the film is not structured, they seemed to have shot bit by bit and stuck all the scenes casually at end therefore its not easy to find where the story is attached. Malini Mannath of Chennai Online wrote, "'Sudhesi' is an example of how bad a Vijaykanth film can turn out to be!".
