= Muddula Priyudu =

- DVD cover
- Directed by: K. Raghavendra Rao
- Written by: Satyanand
- Produced by: K. Krishna Mohana Rao
- Starring: Venkatesh; Ramya Krishna; Rambha
- Cinematography: A. Vincent
- Edited by: Kotagiri Venkateswara Rao
- Music by: M. M. Keeravani
- Production company: R.K. Film Associates
- Release date: 1 October 1994
- Running time: 132 minutes
- Country: India
- Language: Telugu

Muddula Priyudu (transl. Adorable Lover) is a 1994 Indian Telugu-language romantic action film directed by K. Raghavendra Rao. Produced by K. Krishna Mohana Rao, the film stars Venkatesh, Ramya Krishna and Rambha, with music composed by M. M. Keeravani. The film was a failure at the box office. It was dubbed in Tamil as Sabash Ramu, in Hindi as Sajna Doli Leke Aana and in Malayalam as Iniyoru Pranayakadha.

== Plot ==
Ramu, a carefree villager, lives with his widowed mother and is in love with Usha, the daughter of Dharmayya, the village president. His life becomes complicated due to frequent clashes with Bujjulu, the son of Kobbarikayala Subbayya, a wealthy landlord and moneylender who is also Dharmayya's brother-in-law. Subbayya schemes to marry Usha to Bujjulu to strengthen his influence in the village. However, Ramu consistently foils his plans, leading Subbayya to falsely accuse Ramu of theft. Ramu manages to expose the truth, resulting in Subbayya's imprisonment.

Despite Subbayya's vengeful threats, Ramu and Usha's marriage is arranged with their families' consent. While traveling to town for wedding preparations, Ramu is attacked by Subbayya's henchmen and left for dead in a river. Believed to be dead, Ramu is rescued by boatmen who nurse him back to health. Suffering from amnesia, he adopts the name Raju and begins a new life. He takes a job tutoring the mischievous grandchildren of Major Narayana Murthy. Through patience and kindness, Raju wins over the children and falls in love with their eldest sister, Sandhya. Narayana Murthy approves their union, and they plan to marry.

Raju’s past resurfaces when Subbayya’s goons attempt to kill him again, triggering the return of his memories of his village and Usha. However, he forgets his time with Sandhya and returns home to reconcile with Usha. Sandhya, heartbroken and determined, tracks him down with the help of her servant and friend, Gundu. She finds him in the village but struggles to connect with him as he does not remember her.

As misunderstandings escalate, Major Narayana Murthy arrives in the village and reveals a secret from Sandhya's past: she was previously married, but her husband died on their wedding day, leading her to suppress parts of her memory. Meanwhile, Subbayya is released from prison and kidnaps Usha in a final attempt to seek revenge. Ramu confronts Subbayya and his goons, ultimately defeating them and rescuing Usha.

In the end, Sandhya accepts her fate and departs, leaving Ramu and Usha to marry and begin their life together.

== Cast ==
- Venkatesh as Ramu / Raju
- Ramya Krishna as Sandhya (Voice dubbed by Saritha)
- Rambha as Usha (Voice dubbed by Shilpa)
- Satyanarayana as Major Narayana Murthy
- Kota Srinivasa Rao as Kobbarikayala Subbayya
- Gollapudi Maruti Rao as Dharmayya
- Annapoorna as Parvathamma, Ramu's mother
- Brahmanandam as Gundu
- Babu Mohan as Thannula Swamy
- Ali as Bujjulu
- Suthivelu as Gundu's Uncle
- Ratnasagar as Gundu's Mother
- Chidatala Apparao

== Music ==
Muddula Priyudu

Film score by M. M. Keeravani
- Released: 1994
- Genre: Soundtrack
- Length: 25.48
- Label: Supreme Music
- Producer: M. M. Keeravani

M. M. Keeravani chronology
Gandeevam (1994)	Muddula Priyudu (1994)	Bobbili Simham (1994)

Music was composed by M. M. Keeravani. Audio soundtrack was released on Supreme Music Company label.

No.	Title	Lyrics	Singer(s)	Length
1.	"Vasanthamala"	Veturi	S. P. Balasubrahmanyam, Chitra	5:02
2.	"Sirichandanapu Chekka"	Veturi	S. P. Balasubrahmanyam, Chitra	4:59
3.	"Evaro Ravali"	Veturi	S. P. Balasubrahmanyam	5:10
4.	"Nake Ganaka"	Sirivennela Seetharama Sastry	S. P. Balasubrahmanyam, Chitra	4:52
5.	"Chitapata"	Veturi	S. P. Balasubrahmanyam, Chitra	4:00
6.	"Jai Jai Mahakaya"	Sirivennela Seetharama Sastry	S. P. Balasubrahmanyam	2:22
7.	"Vasanthamala-II"	Veturi	S. P. Balasubrahmanyam, Chitra
Total length:				25.48
