= Dharma Chakram =

- Theatrical release poster
- Directed by: Suresh Krissna
- Written by: Suresh Krissna; M. V. S. Haranatha Rao (dialogues)
- Produced by: D. Ramanaidu
- Starring: Venkatesh; Ramya Krishna; Prema
- Cinematography: K. Ravindra Babu
- Edited by: K. A. Martand; Marthand K. Venkatesh
- Music by: M. M. Srilekha
- Production company: Suresh Productions
- Release date: 13 January 1996
- Running time: 2:24:34
- Country: India
- Language: Telugu

Dharma Chakram (transl. Wheel of Righteousness) is a 1996 Indian Telugu-language action thriller film written and directed by Suresh Krissna, and produced by D. Ramanaidu under the Suresh Productions banner. The film stars Venkatesh, Ramya Krishna, and Prema while Girish Karnad plays a pivotal role. The music was composed by M. M. Srilekha. Venkatesh received the Nandi Award for Best Actor and the film won the Filmfare Best Actor Award (Telugu). The film was dubbed in Tamil as Nakkeeran. The film was successful at the box office.

== Plot ==
Rakesh (Venkatesh) is an angry young man who is an honest lawyer, a disciple of justice, and treated as a great personality by poor people. He lives with his mother Sarada (Srividya), she is not only a mother but also a good friend to him. Rakesh has strong animosity toward his father Mahendra (Girish Karnad), a MLA, that's why he is separated from him. Sandhya (Ramya Krishnan), a journalist tries for an interview with Rakesh, but he does not cooperate, so she follows him like white on rice and falls in love with him. Sandhya tells of her love for Rakesh's mother Sarada, then she reveals Rakesh's past.

4 years back, Rakesh is an energetic guy who enjoys day-to-day life, he falls in love with a middle-class girl Surekha (Prema), but his father Mahendra fixes his marriage with a big politician's daughter for his political growth. Rakesh rejects that match and makes marriage arrangements with Surekha, and to stop it, Mahendra traps Surekha and proves her as a prostitute in court, and for that, Surekha commits suicide. In anger, Rakesh goes to kill Mahendra, but he leaves him for his mother's sake and they both get separated from his father. After listening to this, Sandhya still loves him, she expresses her love to him and slowly he also starts liking her and prepares himself to marry her.

Meanwhile, Mahendra gets a problem with his political career because of his family disturbances, he tries again to patch up with his family, but Rakesh turns down him, so in frustration, he kills his keep Balamani (Krishnaveni). To escape from the murder case, he asks Rakesh to take up the case, but Rakesh refuses, he blackmails him a lot, and even then Rakesh doesn't come down. At last, Mahendra plays with Sarada's emotions, which influence Rakesh to take up Mahendra's case, which irritates Rakesh a lot because he knows that he is doing injustice.

Finally, his mother gives freedom to him to fight against Mahendra. Ultimately, Rakesh proves that Mahendra is a culprit and preserves justice.

== Cast ==
- Venkatesh as Rakesh
- Ramya Krishna as Sandhya (Voice dubbed by Roja Ramani)
- Prema as Surekha (Voice dubbed by Silpa)
- Girish Karnad as Mahendra
- Srividya as Sarada
- D. Ramanaidu as Party President
- Brahmanandam
- AVS as Gumastha Gurulingam
- Rallapalli as Anjibabu
- J. V. Somayajulu as Judge
- Subbaraya Sarma as Surekha's father
- MVS Harinath Rao as Singaram
- Kota Shankar Rao as Public Prosecutor
- Ananth Babu as Singaram's Henchman
- Saradhi as TV Shop Owner
- Telangana Shakuntala
- Krishnaveni as Balamani
- Ratna Sagar
- Dubbing Janaki

== Soundtrack ==
Dharma Chakram

Soundtrack album by M. M. Srilekha
- Released: 1996
- Genre: Soundtrack
- Length: 28:38
- Label: Supreme Music
- Producer: M. M. Srilekha

M. M. Srilekha chronology
Oho Naa Pellanta (1996)	Dharma Chakram (1996)	Navvulatha (1997)

Music composed by M. M. Srilekha. Music released on SUPREME Music Company.

No.	Title	Lyrics	Singer(s)	Length
1.	"Thama Soma Mama"	Chandrabose	S. P. Balasubrahmanyam	4:11
2.	"Dheera Sammere"	Veturi	S. P. Balasubrahmanyam, Chitra	4:57
3.	"Cheppana Cheppana"	Chandrabose	S. P. Balasubrahmanyam, M. M. Srilekha	5:03
4.	"Hello Hello"	Chandrabose	S. P. Balasubrahmanyam, Chitra	4:31
5.	"Sogasuchuda"	Chandrabose	S. P. Balasubrahmanyam, Chitra	4:51
6.	"Aagadaye Ranam"	Veturi	S. P. Balasubrahmanyam	5:05
Total length:				28:38

== Box office ==
- It was an average grosser at the box office.

== Awards ==
Nandi Awards

- Best Actor - Venkatesh
- Best Cinematographer - Ravindra Babu
- Best Art Director - Plenti
