= Prema (1989 film) =

- Theatrical release poster
- Directed by: Suresh Krissna
- Screenplay by: Suresh Krishna; Ananthu
- Story by: Suresh Krishna
- Produced by: D. Ramanaidu
- Starring: Venkatesh; Revathi
- Cinematography: P. S. Prakash
- Edited by: K. A. Marthand
- Music by: Ilaiyaraaja
- Production company: Suresh Productions
- Distributed by: Rajeswari Films
- Release date: 12 January 1989
- Running time: 156 minutes
- Country: India
- Language: Telugu

Prema (transl. Love) is a 1989 Indian Telugu-language musical romance film directed by Suresh Krissna in his Telugu film debut and produced by D. Ramanaidu. It stars Venkatesh and Revathi, with original soundtrack by Ilaiyaraaja. It was dubbed into Tamil as Anbu Chinnam (1990). Suresh Krissna remade the film in Hindi as Love (1991). The film won four Nandi Awards.

== Plot ==
Pruthvi (Venkatesh) is an orphan who tries hard to become a great singer. One day he comes across a beautiful, naughty young girl Maggi (Revathi Menon), and they both fall in love. When he approaches Maggi's parents to ask her hand in marriage, his criminal background comes into the picture, and they disagree. In the past, Pruthvi has killed his father as he was the reason for his mother's suicide. Pruthvi tries hard to get Maggi's parents' consent, and at last, they agree. Unfortunately, when Maggi kisses Pruthvi on the altar, she loses her consciousness. In the hospital, the doctors tell Pruthvi that she has taken too many medicines for small problems, and now the medicines have poisoned her vital organs. Meanwhile, Pruthvi gets a chance to participate in a singing competition. Maggi, after regaining her consciousness, knows about this and sends Pruthvi to sing. Pruthvi sings and ends up winning the competition. He comes back to Maggi with the trophy. By that time, Maggi's condition becomes critical, and she dies in Pruthvi's hands, saying that she will always be alive in his heart.

== Cast ==
- Venkatesh as Pruthvi
- Revathi as Maggie
- S. P. Balasubrahmanyam as Satya Rao
- Gollapudi Maruti Rao as Ananda Rao
- Manjula as Stella
- Vaishnavi as Lizzie
- Kalpana as Geeta
- Brahmanandam as Gambler
- Rallapalli as House Owner
- Pradeep Shakthi as Peter
- P. L. Narayana as Geetha's Father
- P. J. Sarma as Father
- Chalapathi Rao as Minister
- Bhimaraju as Neighbor
- Gundu Hanumantha Rao as Gambler
- Jenny as S.I. Paramahamsa

== Soundtrack ==
Music was composed by Ilaiyaraaja. Lyrics written by Acharya Aatreya.

No.	Title	Singer(s)	Length
1.	"Priyatama"	S. P. Balasubrahmanyam, Chitra (Humming)	5:49
2.	"Eenade Yedho"	S. P. Balasubrahmanyam, Chitra	4:28
3.	"You Are My Hero"	S. P. Balasubrahmanyam, Chitra	4:29
4.	"Ivvu Ivvu"	S. P. Balasubrahmanyam, Chitra	5:18
5.	"Ekkada Ekkada"	S. P. Sailaja	4:35
6.	"I Am sorry"	S. P. Balasubrahmanyam	4:43
7.	"Ontari Vadini Nenu"	S. P. Balasubrahmanyam	2:09
Total length:			32:04

== Reception ==
N. Krishnaswamy of The Indian Express wrote, "A love story that is sometimes put across with a delicacy not found in the general run of films".

== Accolades ==
Nandi Awards

- Best Actor – Venkatesh
- Special Jury Award – S. P. Balasubrahmanyam
- Best Director – Suresh Krissna
- Best Cinematographer – P. S. Prakash
