= Guru (2017 film) =

2017 film by Sudha Kongara

- Theatrical release poster
- Directed by: Sudha Kongara
- Written by: Sudha Kongara
- Based on: Irudhi Suttru (Tamil)/Saala Khadoos (Hindi)(2016) by Sudha Kongara
- Produced by: S. Shashikanth
- Starring: Venkatesh; Ritika Singh
- Cinematography: K. A. Sakthivel
- Edited by: Sathish Suriya
- Music by: Santhosh Narayanan
- Production company: YNOT Studios
- Release date: 31 March 2017
- Running time: 120 minutes
- Country: India
- Language: Telugu
- Box office: ₹18.52 crore (US$1.9 million)-₹21.97 crore (US$2.3 million)

Guru (transl. Mentor) is a 2017 Indian Telugu-language sports drama film written and directed by Sudha Kongara and produced by S. Shashikanth on YNOT Studios banner. The film stars Venkatesh and Ritika Singh with the music composed by Santhosh Narayanan. The film is remake of Kongara's own film Irudhi Suttru/Saala Khadoos (2016). The film got unanimous positive reviews from critics and audiences.

== Plot ==
Aditya alias Aadi is a failed boxer who, despite his talent, falls victim to corruption and favouritism within the boxing association. Years later, he coaches women's boxing teams but remains frustrated by biased selection practices. Following a dispute with association head Dev Khatri, Aadi is falsely accused of sexual harassment and transferred to Vizag. Despite the poor facilities, he discovers considerable talent in roadside vegetable seller Rameswari alias Ramulu, whom he and assistant coach Punch Ponds see attacking judges during her sister's tournament.

Aadi offers to train Rameswari for four hours a day, disregarding her elder sister Lakshmi alias Lux, who has boxed for eight years. Rameswari initially clashes with Aadi over his ruthless methods and deliberately loses a local match. Aadi later asks their parents to send both sisters to a hostel so they can concentrate on training. Rameswari initially misunderstands his intentions, but changes her attitude after learning that Aadi sold his motorbike to buy her new training equipment. She trains intensely, develops feelings for Aadi and confesses them before a qualifying match, but he rejects her. During the warm-up, jealous of her sister's progress, Lakshmi injures Rameswari's hand, causing her to lose. Believing she has deliberately lost again, Aadi expels her from the training camp.

Dev exploits the situation by sending Rameswari to Delhi for a cultural exchange tournament, where she is matched against a heavyweight Russian boxer and knocked out within seconds. Afterwards, Dev makes an indecent proposal to her, which she rejects by injuring him. He retaliates by having her arrested on false theft charges.

Aadi bails Rameswari out and takes her to Delhi, securing her a wildcard entry to the World Boxing Championship. She trains hard and reaches the final. Dev removes her name from the list and tells Aadi that she can compete only if he resigns. The final is against the same Russian boxer who previously defeated her. Rameswari is devastated when she learns of Aadi's resignation and loses points in the opening rounds. She is badly injured, but Aadi arrives at the stadium and signals that she should target her opponent's arms to weaken her. Rameswari follows his strategy and knocks out her opponent seconds before the final bell. Dev attempts to claim credit for her training, but Rameswari punches him before running to Aadi and embracing him, marking their emotional reunion as coach and student.

== Cast ==
- Venkatesh as Aditya "Aadi" Rao
- Ritika Singh as Rameswari "Ramulu"
- Nassar as Punch Ponds
- Tanikella Bharani as Murali
- Zakir Hussain as Dev Khatri
- Mumtaz Sorcar as Lakshmi "Lux"
- Raghu Babu as Soomulu
- Anitha Chowdary as Rajyam
- Ananth Babu as Boxing Association member
- Bipin as Innocent
- Ramajogayya Sastry as Shopkeeper

== Production ==
Principal photography commenced in September 2016 in Hyderabad. Principle filmography took place in Vizag, Hyderabad, and Goa. The film has completed shooting in the first week of December 2016. While Santhosh Narayanan and Sathish Suriya was retained as music director and editor from the original version of the film, there are some changes on other technical teams. Art director Jacki was roped into the project, replacing T. Santhanam from the original adaptation.

== Soundtrack ==
Guru

Film score by Santhosh Narayanan
- Released: 2017
- Genre: Soundtrack
- Length: 21:56
- Label: Lahari Music
- Producer: Santhosh Narayanan

Santhosh Narayanan chronology
Kaashmora (2016)	Guru (2017)	Bairavaa (2017)

Music composed by Santhosh Narayanan. Music released on Lahari Music Company. Except "Jingidi", all other songs were reused from the original Tamil film's soundtrack. The song "Jingidi" marked the singing debut of actor Venkatesh.

No.	Title	Lyrics	Singer(s)	Length
1.	"Ne Zara"	Sri Mani	Siddharth Mahadevan	4:15
2.	"Jingidi"	Bhaskarabhatla	Venkatesh	2:57
3.	"Gundelothulalo"	Ramajogayya Sastry	Dhee	3:10
4.	"Ey Pataakey"	Bhaskarabhatla	Ananthu	3:04
5.	"Ukku Naram"	Ramajogayya Sastry	Siddharth Mahadevan	4:20
6.	"O Sakkanoda"	Ramajogayya Sastry	Dhee	4:10
Total length:				21:56

== Reception ==
Ch Sowmya Sruthi of The Times of India rated the film three-and-a-half out of five stars and wrote, "The movie, being a sports drama that comes with heavy and loaded climax sequences finally ends on a calm and simple note but not before putting a smile on the viewers’ face. The movie is a must-watch this weekend for not just people who are fans of Venkatesh but also for the sports enthusiasts and movie buffs who appreciate good cinema." Suhas Yellapantula of The New Indian Express gave the film three out of five stars and noted that "Director Sudha's execution is terrific and the performances stretches the film beyond its potential".

Priyanka Sundar of The Indian Express gave the film three out of five stars and wrote, "Overall, it is a good watch. It is a good sports drama with an important message. Venkatesh’s frustration with the politics in the sports committee, Ramudu’s rapport for her coach, and the dialogues are the highlights of this film." Suresh Kavirayani of Deccan Chronicle wrote, "Guru is a good sports drama and not a regular formula or commercial film. There are some similarities in theme with Dangal, which released recently, but the subject of Guru is completely different, except for the sports politics. This is the first Telugu film with sports as the backdrop and shows Venkatesh in a completely new avatar. Watch it."

Sangeetha Devi Dundoo of The Hindu wrote, "Sudha Kongara’s story doesn’t throw up surprises. Yet, her keen eye for detail and well written characters keep us riveted. She extracts winsome performances from her cast and her technicians are in sync with the rugged terrain." Hemanth Kumar CR of Firstpost wrote, "At a run time of just under two hours, Guru gives you plenty of stuff to brood upon long after you watch the film. Venkatesh delivers a nuanced performance as a boxing coach, but it is Ritika Singh who lands a sucker punch in the end. A big thumbs up."
