= Dhruva Nakshatram (1989 film) =

- Theatrical release poster
- Directed by: Y. Nageswara Rao
- Written by: Paruchuri Brothers
- Produced by: K. Ashok Kumar
- Starring: Venkatesh; Rajani
- Cinematography: S. Gopal Reddy
- Edited by: K. A. Martand
- Music by: Chakravarthy
- Production company: Sri Usha Art Productions
- Distributed by: Suresh Productions
- Release date: 29 June 1989
- Running time: 147 minutes
- Country: India
- Language: Telugu

Dhruva Nakshatram (transl. Pole star) is a 1989 Indian Telugu-language film directed by Y. Nageswara Rao and produced by K. Ashok Kumar under Sri Usha Art Productions. It stars Venkatesh and Rajani, with music composed by Chakravarthy. The film, released on 29 June 1989, was a box office hit.

== Plot ==
Bharati Devi, a widow, lives in a town with her three children: two sons Dhruva Kumar, Narendra and a daughter Saroja. They live in a rented house and the landlord behaves badly with Bharathi Devi and robs her of all her money. Dhruva Kumar beats the landlord and runs away from home. After 25 years, Dhruva Kumar is a lorry driver in Bombay, Lalitha comes to Bombay for a job from Andhra and falls in love with him.

Lakshmipati and Mattigadala Manikyala Rao are big gangsters and Smugglers in Bombay, both are opponents. During a roadside fight, Dhruva Kumar catches Manikyala Rao's smuggled goods. Manikyala Rao traps Dhruva Kumar in a smuggling case and is caught by police, he offers to work with him, but Dhruva Kumar refuses his offer and runs away from Bombay with help of his friend Sivaji along with Lalitha and reaches Hyderabad, there he is arrested by police and submitted to the court, where he sees his mother Bharathi Devi and recognizes her. Lakshmipati frees out Dhruva Kumar when he agrees to work with him.

Dhruva Kumar tries to meet his family through his brother Narendra, who is a customs officer, and sister Saroja, but Bharathi Devi refuses to accept him. Narendra and Manikyala Rao's younger brother Mohan Rao are close friends, Manikyala Rao makes a plan to make Saroja's marriage with his younger brother, and Dhruva Kumar breaks out his plan and makes Saroja marriage with his friend Sivaji. Meanwhile, Narendra arrests Lakshmipati, and orders him to kill Narendra, but Dhruva Kumar protects him and becomes a rival to Lakshmipati also. Finally, Lakshmipati and Manikyala Rao join together to destroy Dhruva Kumar, they kidnap his entire family. Finally, Dhruva Kumar protects his family by sacrificing his life.

== Cast ==
- Venkatesh as Dhruva Kumar
- Rajani as Lalitha
- Satyanarayana as Lakshmipati
- Sharada as Bharati Devi
- Gollapudi Maruti Rao as Lalitha's Father
- Nutan Prasad as Mattigaddala Manikyala Rao
- Bhanu Chander as Narendra
- Siva Krishna as Shivaji
- Rohini as Saroja
- Brahmanandam as Thief
- Chalapathi Rao as Lakshmipati's Brother
- Rallapalli as Kabirbal
- Balaji as Mohan Rao
- Fight Master Raju as Fighter
- Jaya Prakash Reddy as Varma
- Jeeva as Rowdy
- Master Rajesh as Childhood Dhuva Kumar
- Baby Raasi as Childhood Saroja
- Chitti Babu
- Ashok Kumar

== Soundtrack ==
Music composed by Chakravarthy.

| S. No. | Song title | Singers | lyrics | length |
|---|---|---|---|---|
| 1 | "Ee Ardharatrilona Papa" | S. P. Balasubrahmanyam | Acharya Aatreya | 3:56 |
| 2 | "Kasiga Kougilistha" | S. P. Balasubrahmanyam, S. Janaki | Acharya Aatreya | 3:42 |
| 3 | "Howle How" | S. P. Balasubrahmanyam, S. Janaki | Veturi | 4:01 |
| 4 | "Rambalaki Rangulaki" | S. P. Balasubrahmanyam, S. Janaki | Veturi | 4:09 |
| 5 | "Pelli Pelli" | S. P. Balasubrahmanyam, S. Janaki | Veturi | 4:21 |
