= Venkatesh (actor) =

Indian actor and film producer (born 1960)

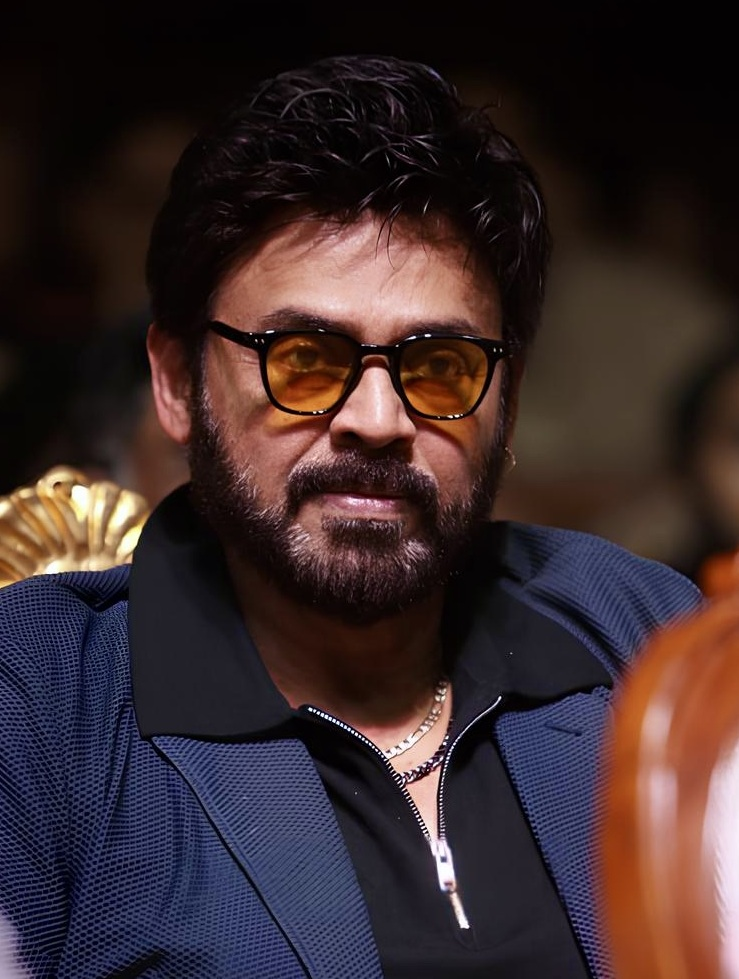
- Venkatesh in 2024
- Born: Daggubati Venkatesh; 13 December 1960 (age 65); Madras (present-day Chennai), Tamil Nadu, India
- Other name: Venky
- Education: Loyola College, Chennai (BCom); Monterey Institute of International Studies (MBA)
- Occupations: Actor; Film producer
- Years active: 1971–present
- Works: Full list
- Spouse: Neeraja (m. 1985)
- Children: 4
- Father: D. Ramanaidu
- Relatives: D. Suresh Babu (brother); Rana Daggubati (nephew); Naga Chaitanya (nephew)
- Family: see Daggubati–Akkineni family

Daggubati Venkatesh (born 13 December 1960) is an Indian actor and film producer known for his work predominantly in Telugu cinema. Venkatesh has a prolific career spanning over 55 years and is known for portraying a variety of characters. He has received many accolades including six Filmfare Awards and five Nandi Awards.

Venkatesh made his debut in 1986 with the commercially successful Kaliyuga Pandavulu. He achieved stardom with box-office hits such as Srinivasa Kalyanam (1987), Brahma Puthrudu (1988), Prema (1989), Dhruva Nakshatram (1989), Bobbili Raja (1990), and Kshana Kshanam (1991), the latter of which featured at the Fribourg Festival and went on to gather a cult following.

Venkatesh received further acclaim for his notable performances as a painter in Swarnakamalam (1988), which featured in the Indian panorama section of the 12th IFFI, an attorney in both Sathruvu (1991) and Dharma Chakram (1996), a coolie in Coolie No. 1 (1991), an eccentric cop in both Surya IPS (1991) and Gharshana (2004), an autistic villager in Chanti (1992), in the romantic dramas: Pavitra Bandham (1996), Preminchukundam Raa (1997), Premante Idera (1998), Raja (1999), Kalisundam Raa (2000), Nuvvu Naaku Nachav (2001), Vasantam (2003), Malliswari (2004), Aadavari Matalaku Arthale Verule (2007), and Bodyguard (2012), in the family dramas: Suryavamsam (1998), Sankranti (2005) and Seethamma Vakitlo Sirimalle Chettu (2013), a journalist in Ganesh (1998), in the action dramas: Jayam Manadera (2000), Lakshmi (2006), Tulasi (2007) and Venky Mama (2019), in the comedies: Chintakayala Ravi (2008), Namo Venkatesa (2010), F2 (2019), F3 (2022) (2022), and Sankranthiki Vasthunam (2025), in the crime thrillers Eenaadu (2009), Drushyam (2014) and Drushyam 2 (2021), an atheist in Gopala Gopala (2015), a boxing coach in Guru (2017), and a farmer in Narappa (2021).

Venkatesh also starred in Hindi language works such as Anari (1993), Taqdeerwala (1995), and Rana Naidu (2023). In addition to acting, he co-owns Suresh Productions, one of the largest film production companies in India, under which he acted in several films. He is also the mentor of the Telugu Warriors, representing Tollywood in the Celebrity Cricket League.

== Early life ==
Venkatesh was born on 13 December 1960 in a Telugu family to film producer and former Member of Parliament, D. Ramanaidu and Rajeswari in Madras (present-day Chennai), India. He has an elder brother Suresh Babu, who runs Suresh Productions, and a younger sister Lakshmi.

Venkatesh did his schooling in Don Bosco, Egmore, Chennai and graduated in commerce from Loyola College, Chennai. He got his MBA from the Middlebury Institute of International Studies at Monterey, USA. After his return to India, he wanted to get into film production but instead became an actor.

== Career ==
=== 1971–1995: Debut and early career ===
Venkatesh first appeared as a child actor in the 1971 film Prema Nagar. His first film as a full-fledged lead was K. Raghavendra Rao-directed Kaliyuga Pandavulu (1986), alongside Khushbu which was a debut for both of them. The film won him a Nandi Special Jury Award.

Swarnakamalam (1988) which came in the direction of K. Viswanath happens to be the classic of that era. The film also won Nandi Awards for the second time in two years. Prema, which came in the year 1989, achieved a cult status. Dhruva Nakshatram, which was released in the same year, was also a mass hit at the box office. Bobbili Raja broke the all-time records at the Telugu box office in 1990. Films like Coolie (1991) and Kshana Kshanam (1991) catapulted him to stardom on par with the then superstars of the Telugu cinema Megastar Chiranjeevi, Nandamuri Balakrishna and Akkineni Nagarjuna. Chanti (1992), a remake of the Tamil flick Chinna Thambi (1991), was another box-office hit. It earned him massive box office collections. Chanti was later remade in Hindi as Anari (1993), only to receive more praise from Hindi audiences. Immediately, he showed a different variation in Chinarayudu (1993). Venkatesh's films have hardly ever been embroiled in controversy, but there was an exception once. His movie Kondapalli Raja, which released in 1993, stirred up a controversy before its release. Kondapalli Raja was the second Telugu remake of Rajinikanth’s Tamil film Annaamalai (1992). He later worked on films like Abbayigaru (1993), Super Police (1994), Muddula Priyudu (1994), Pokiri Raja (1995) and Taqdeerwala (1995). Venkatesh was so successful at the prime of his career that his name was tagged with ‘Victory’ to be rechristened as Victory Venkatesh.

=== 1996–2012: Critical and commercial success ===
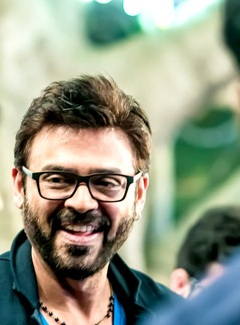
Venkatesh at CCl

In 1996, he portrayed an honest lawyer in Dharma Chakram, which won him both the Nandi Award and Filmfare Award South. Later that year, he played a husband struggling between two wives in the E. V. V. Satyanarayana directed hit comedy drama Intlo Illalu Vantintlo Priyuralu. The following year, he starred in the romantic action film Preminchukundam Raa. The film, which was one of the first portrayals of factionalism in Rayalaseema region, was a big commercial success. In Ganesh (1998), he played a person fighting the ills of the Indian public healthcare system. His 1999 drama film Raja, where he plays a small time thief who is reformed by his love was also well received by the audience. Following this, he established himself as one of top actors in Telugu cinema.

In 2001, Venkatesh starred in the romantic comedy Nuvvu Naaku Nachav which was a critical and commercial success. The success continued with Malliswari (2004), his second collaboration with director K. Vijaya Bhaskar after Nuvvu Naaku Nachav. In 2007, he starred in two films, Aadavari Matalaku Arthale Verule and Tulasi, both of which grossed over ₹30 crore at the box office. In the following years, Venkatesh appeared in several films, including Chintakayala Ravi (2008), Namo Venkatesa (2010) and Bodyguard (2012).

=== 2013–present: Multi-starrers and experimental roles ===
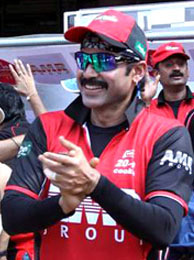
Venkatesh snapped at CCL.

Venkatesh is known for his multi-starrers in Telugu cinema. He has balanced lead roles with supporting characters, with both senior actors and upcoming actors. In 2013, Venkatesh co-starred alongside Mahesh Babu in the critically acclaimed drama Seethamma Vakitlo Sirimalle Chettu. The film was one of the first Telugu major multi-starrer films after many years. Subsequently, Venkatesh went on to feature in other multi-starrers such as Masala (2013), Gopala Gopala (2015) and F2: Fun and Frustration (2019). F2 grossed over ₹127 crore and ended up as one of the highest-grossing Telugu films of 2019.

Venkatesh's performance in Drushyam (2014) received several accolades from the critics. He portrayed a strict boxing coach in the Sudha Kongara's sports drama Guru in 2017.

Later in 2019, he starred in Venky Mama, alongside his nephew Naga Chaitanya. The film was a profitable venture, grossing more than ₹72 crore worldwide. In the same year, he dubbed in Telugu for the Genie in Alladin. His 2021 film Narappa was released on Amazon Prime, which marked his first direct-to-OTT released. In 2022, the sequel to F2, F3: Fun and Frustration, released to a fairly positive reception from the critics and audience. In 2024, Venkatesh made his first ever pan-Indian film debut with Saindhav, directed by Sailesh Kolanu.

In 2025, he reunited with Anil Ravipudi and Dil Raju on the comedy, Sankranthiki Vasthunam, becoming the highest-grossing film in Venkatesh' career and the highest-grossing comedy in Telugu cinema.

== Endorsements ==
- On 24 April 2010, he signed with Manappuram General Finance and Leasing Ltd as their brand ambassador for Andhra Pradesh.
- He opened Ramraj Cotton Company branch in Ameerpet as a brand ambassador for the company.

== Personal life ==
Venkatesh married Neeraja in 1985 and the couple has four children—three daughters and one son. His eldest daughter, Aashritha, married Vinayak Reddy, the grandson of R. Surender Reddy, the chairman of Hyderabad Race Club. He is also the uncle of actors Rana Daggubati and Naga Chaitanya.

== Awards and nominations ==
Year	Film	Award	Category	Result	Ref.
1986	Kaliyuga Pandavulu	Nandi Awards	Best Male Debut (Special Jury Award)	Won	
1986	Kaliyuga Pandavulu	Filmfare Awards South	Best Actor – Telugu	Nominated	
1988	Brahma Puthrudu	Filmfare Awards South	Best Actor – Telugu	Won	
1988	Swarna Kamalam	Nandi Awards	Special Jury Award	Won	
1989	Prema	Nandi Awards	Best Actor	Won	
1989	Prema	Filmfare Awards South	Best Actor – Telugu	Nominated	
1990	Bobbili Raja	Filmfare Awards South	Best Actor – Telugu	Nominated	
1991	Kshana Kshanam	Filmfare Awards South	Best Actor – Telugu	Nominated	
1992	Chanti	Filmfare Awards South	Best Actor – Telugu	Nominated	
1993	Abbaigaru	Filmfare Awards South	Best Actor – Telugu	Nominated	
1994	Muddula Priyudu	Filmfare Awards South	Best Actor – Telugu	Nominated	
1995	Dharma Chakram	Nandi Awards	Best Actor	Won	
1996	Dharma Chakram	Filmfare Awards South	Best Actor – Telugu	Won	
1996	Sahasa Veerudu Sagara Kanya	Filmfare Awards South	Best Actor – Telugu	Nominated	
1997	Preminchukundam Raa	Filmfare Awards South	Best Actor – Telugu	Nominated	
1998	Ganesh	Nandi Awards	Best Actor	Won	
1998	Ganesh	Filmfare Awards South	Best Actor – Telugu	Won	
1999	Raja	Filmfare Awards South	Best Actor – Telugu	Nominated	
2000	Kalisundam Raa	Nandi Awards	Best Actor	Won	
2000	Kalisundam Raa	Filmfare Awards South	Special Award	Won	
2000	Jayam Manade Raa	Filmfare Awards South	Best Actor – Telugu	Won	
2005	Sankranthi	Filmfare Awards South	Best Actor – Telugu	Nominated	
2005	Sankranthi	Santosham Film Awards	Best Actor	Won	
2007	Adavari Matalaku Ardhale Verule	Nandi Awards	Best Actor	Won	
2007	Adavari Matalaku Ardhale Verule	Santosham Film Awards	Best Actor	Won	
2007	Adavari Matalaku Ardhale Verule	Filmfare Awards South	Best Actor – Telugu	Nominated	
2010	Eenadu	Filmfare Awards South	Best Supporting Actor – Telugu	Nominated	
2014	Masala	Filmfare Awards South	Best Supporting Actor – Telugu	Nominated	
2015	Drushyam	Filmfare Awards South	Best Actor – Telugu	Nominated	
2015	Drushyam	TSR – TV9 National Film Awards	Best Actor (Jury)	Won	
2015	Drushyam	South Indian International Movie Awards	Best Actor – Telugu	Nominated	
2016	Gopala Gopala	TSR – TV9 National Film Awards	Best Actor	Won	
2017	Guru	Filmfare Awards South	Best Actor – Telugu	Nominated	
2017	Guru	Filmfare Awards South	Critics Best Actor – Telugu	Won	
