= Jyothika filmography =

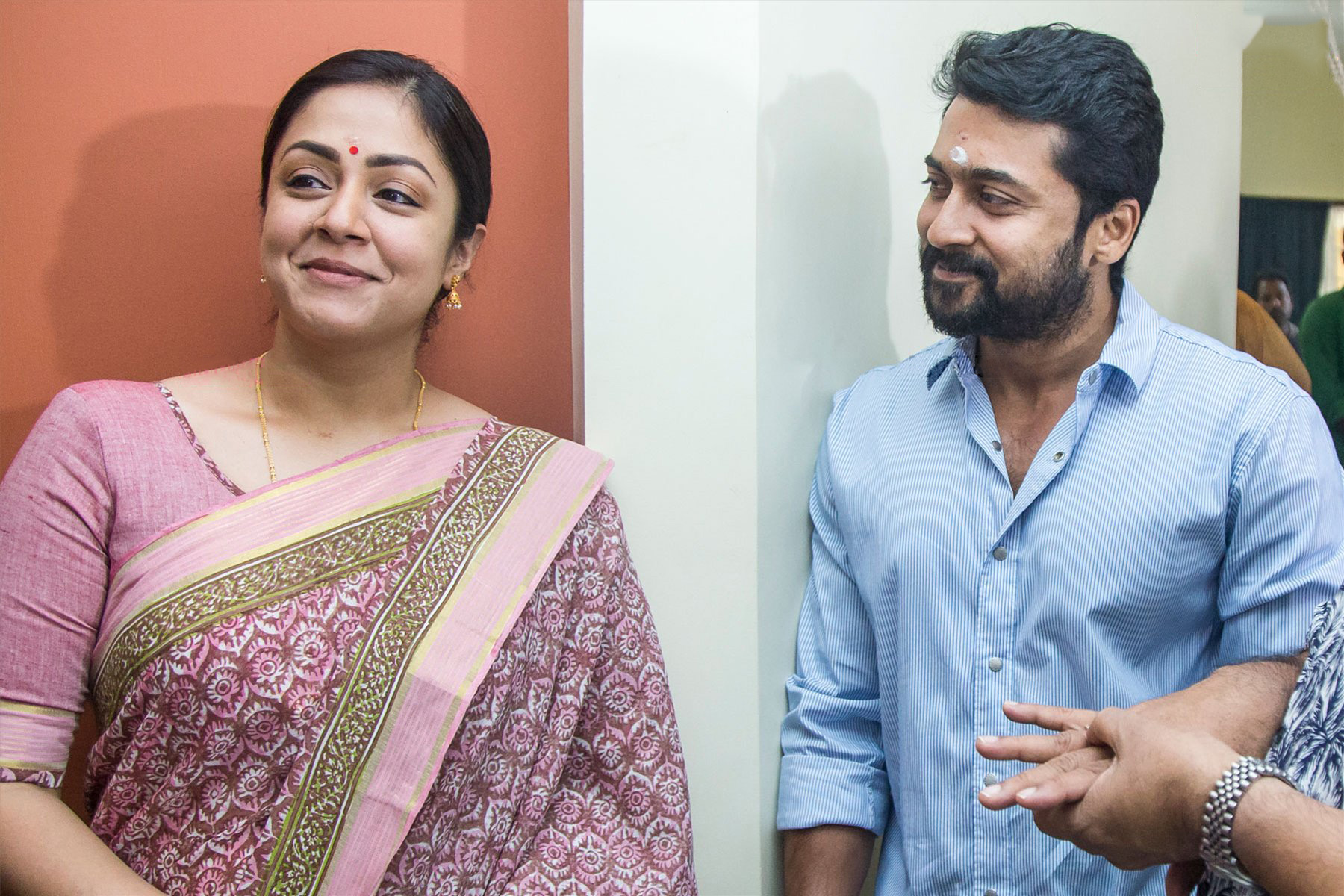

Jyothika is an Indian actress who appears predominantly in Tamil and Hindi films. She also acted in some Malayalam, Telugu, and Kannada films. She won one National Award, five Filmfare Awards, eleven Tamil Nadu State Film Awards, two Cinema Express Awards, one South Indian International Movie Award, International Tamil Film Award and four Dinakaran Awards. She is also a recipient of the Kalaimamani Award. She is regarded as one of the most prolific actresses in Tamil cinema. She has been ranked among the best actresses of South India by The Times of India and The Hindu.

She debuted in Bollywood in the Hindi film Doli Saja Ke Rakhna (1997), directed by Priyadarshan. She starred in her first Tamil film Vaalee (1999) and her first Telugu film Tagore (2003), opposite Chiranjeevi. She received her first Filmfare Award for Vaalee (1999) as Filmfare Award for Best Female Debut – South. She was awarded the Filmfare Best Tamil Actress Award for Kushi (2000). A string of successful films followed and gained prominence for her performances in Kushi (2000), Dumm Dumm Dumm (2001), Poovellam Un Vasam (2001), Kaakha Kaakha (2004), Perazhagan (2004), Chandramukhi (2005) and Mozhi, (2007), for the latter three she won Tamil Nadu State Film Award for Best Actress.For the movie, Mozhi, she was in the final three for National Film Award for Best Actress for her outstanding performance, however she lost the award to Umashree for the Kannada film Gulabi Talkies. She has been nominated 16 times for Best Tamil Actress at South Filmfare Awards.

Jyothika left the industry at the peak of her career marrying Tamil actor Suriya on 11 September 2006, after being engaged in a relationship for several years, and with whom she was paired in seven films. She made a comeback in the film 36 Vayadhinile (2015) where her performance was given good reviews and she received Tamil Nadu State Film Award for Best Actress and Filmfare Critics Award for Best Actress – Tamil. By winning her fourth Best Actress Award at Tamil Nadu State Film Awards, she broke the record of winning most Best Actress Title till date with four as her record. After the success of 36 Vayadhinile, she appeared in a series of women centric movies like Magalir Mattum (2017), Naachiyaar (2018), Kaatrin Mozhi (2018), Raatchasi (2019), and Ponmagal Vandhal (2020) and also played a role in Mani Ratnam's multi-starrer Chekka Chivantha Vaanam (2018). In Pachaikili Muthucharam (2007) she had a crucial role. In 2018, she appeared as the lead role of Chitra, a housewife to Arvind Swamy's character in Mani Ratnam's film Chekka Chivantha Vaanam (2018). She was next seen as a housewife struggling to find her own identity in Kaatrin Mozhi, the Tamil remake of Vidya Balan's Tumhari Sulu. The project was directed by Radha Mohan and marked his reunion with Jyothika after Mozhi. After the success of Kaatrin Mozhi, Jyothika signed three films, Raatchasi, produced by Dream Warrior Pictures in which she plays a school teacher; Jackpot, in which she appears as a cop co-starring Revathi under 2D Entertainment and Thambi, a Jeethu Joseph film along with Karthi. She made a comeback to Malayalam and Hindi film industry with critically acclaimed performances in Kaathal – The Core (2023) with Mammootty and Shaitaan (2024) with Ajay Devgn and R. Madhavan. The latter became the fourth highest grossing Indian film of 2024.

== Films ==
Key
†	Denotes films that have not yet been released

List of Jyothika film credits
Year	Title	Role	Language	Notes
1998	Doli Saja Ke Rakhna	Pallavi Sinha	Hindi	Nominated—Filmfare Award for Best Female Debut; Nominated—Zee Cine Award for Best Female Debut
1999	Vaalee	Meena (Sona) (Note: Jyothika played a single character with two or more names.)	Tamil	Won—Filmfare Award for Best Female Debut – South; Won—Cinema Express Award for Best Newface Actress of the Year; Won—Dinakaran Film Awards for Best Debut Actress
1999	Poovellam Kettuppar	Janaki Kannan (Kalyani)	Tamil	Nominated—Filmfare Award for Best Actress – Tamil
2000	Mugavaree	Viji	Tamil	
2000	Kushi	Jennifer "Jenny" (Selvi)	Tamil	Won—Filmfare Award for Best Actress – Tamil; Won—Cinema Express Award for Best Sensational Actress; Won—Dinakaran Film Awards for Best Actress
2000	Rhythm	Aruna Karthikeyan	Tamil	Won—Cinema Express Award for Best Sensational Actress
2000	Rhythm	Aruna Karthikeyan	Tamil	Nominated—Cinema Express Award for best Onscreen pair (along with Arjun)
2000	Uyirile Kalanthathu	Priya Mahalakshmi	Tamil	
2000	Thenali	Janaki	Tamil	
2000	Snegithiye	Vani "Vasu" Subramaniyam	Tamil	
2001	Little John	Vani	Tamil / Hindi / English	
2001	Dumm Dumm Dumm	Ganga Veluthambi	Tamil	Nominated—Cinema Express Award for best actress
2001	Star	Preethi	Tamil	
2001	Poovellam Un Vasam	Chella	Tamil	Won—Cinema Express Award for Best Actress – Tamil; Nominated—Filmfare Award for Best Actress – Tamil
2001	12B	Jyothika "Jo"	Tamil	
2002	Raja	Priya	Tamil	
2002	One Two Three	Narmadha	Tamil	
2002	Nagarahavu	Keerthi, Prema Patel (Note: Jyothika played two characters.)	Kannada	Won—Udaya Film Award for Best Actress
2002	Nagarahavu	Keerthi, Prema Patel	Kannada	Nominated—Filmfare Award for Best Actress – Kannada
2003	Dhool	Eshwari	Tamil	Won—ITFA Best Actress Award
2003	Dhool	Eshwari	Tamil	Nominated—Filmfare Award for Best Actress – Tamil
2003	Priyamana Thozhi	Nandhini Ashok	Tamil	
2003	Kaakha Kaakha	Maaya Anbuchelvan	Tamil	Won—ITFA Best Actress Special Jury Award
2003	Kaakha Kaakha	Maaya Anbuchelvan	Tamil	Nominated—Filmfare Award for Best Actress – Tamil
2003	Thirumalai	Swetha	Tamil	
2003	Tagore	Nandini a.k.a. Nandu	Telugu	
2003	Three Roses	Pooja	Tamil	
2004	Arul	Kanmani Arulkumaran	Tamil	
2004	Perazhagan	Priya / Shenbagam	Tamil	Won—Tamil Nadu State Film Award for Best Actress; Won-Dinakaran Award for Best Actress
2004	Perazhagan	Priya / Shenbagam	Tamil	Nominated—Filmfare Award for Best Actress – Tamil
2004	Manmadhan	Mythili	Tamil	Nominated—Filmfare Award for Best Actress – Tamil
2004	Mass	Anjali	Telugu	Nominated—Filmfare Award for Best Actress – Telugu
2005	Maayavi	Jyotika a.k.a. Jo	Tamil	
2005	Chandramukhi	Ganga Senthilnathan (Ganga) / Chandramukhi	Tamil	Won—Tamil Nadu State Film Award for Best Actress; Won—Dinakaran Award for Best Actress
2005	Chandramukhi	Ganga Senthilnathan (Ganga) / Chandramukhi	Tamil	Nominated—Filmfare Award for Best Actress – Tamil
2006	Saravana	Sadhana	Tamil	
2006	Shock	Madhuri	Telugu	Nominated—Filmfare Award for Best Actress – Telugu
2006	June R	June R.	Tamil	
2006	Vikramarkudu	Chithra Vikram Singh Rathore	Tamil	narrated as wife of Vikram Singh Rathore (uncredited, portrait appearance only)
2006	Vettaiyaadu Vilaiyaadu	Aaradhana	Tamil	Nominated—Filmfare Award for Best Actress – Tamil
2006	Sillunu Oru Kaadhal	Kunthavi Gautham (Jill)	Tamil	Nominated—Filmfare Award for Best Actress – Tamil
2007	Mozhi	Archana	Tamil	Won—Tamil Nadu State Film Award for Best Actress
2007	Mozhi	Archana	Tamil	Nominated—Filmfare Award for Best Actress – Tamil
2007	Pachaikili Muthucharam	Smitha (Geetha / Kalyani)	Tamil	Won—Ananda Vikatan Award for best villain – Female
2007	Manikanda	Mahalakshmi	Tamil	
2007	Rakklippattu	Josephine	Malayalam	
2009	Seetha Kalyanam	Nimisha	Malayalam	Nominated—Filmfare Award for Best Actress – Malayalam
2010	Nagavalli	Ganga Kailash	Telugu	(uncredited, archival footage from Chandramukhi)
2015	36 Vayadhinile	Vasanthi Thamizhselvan	Tamil	Won—Filmfare Critics Award for Best Actress – Tamil; Won—Tamil Nadu State Film Award for Best Actress; Won—Tamil Nadu State Film Award for Best Film Portraying Woman in Good Light (Co-producer along with Suriya & Pandiraj)
2015	36 Vayadhinile	Vasanthi Thamizhselvan	Tamil	Nominated—Filmfare Award for Best Actress – Tamil
2017	Magalir Mattum	Prabhavathi Surendhar	Tamil	Nominated—Filmfare Award for Best Actress – Tamil
2018	Naachiyaar	P. Naachiyaar Kumari	Tamil	
2018	Chekka Chivantha Vaanam	Chithra Varadharajan	Tamil	Won—Tamil Nadu State Film Award for Best Actress
2018	Kaatrin Mozhi	Vijayalakshmi Balakrishnan (Viji) / RJ Madhu	Tamil	Nominated—Filmfare Award for Best Actress – Tamil
2019	Raatchasi	Geetha Rani (Ammu)	Tamil	Won—Edison Award for Best Actress
2019	Jackpot	Akshaya	Tamil	
2019	Thambi	Parvathy	Tamil	
2020	Ponmagal Vandhal	Venba Pethuraj / Angel / Sakthi Jyothi	Tamil	Nominated—Filmfare Award for Best Actress – Tamil
2021	Udanpirappe	Mathangi Sargunam	Tamil	Nominated—Filmfare Award for Best Actress – Tamil Nominated—JFW Movie Awards for Best Actress - Lead Role
2023	Chandramukhi 2	Ganga Senthilnathan	Tamil	(footage from Chandramukhi)
2023	Kaathal – The Core	Omana Philip Matthew	Malayalam	Won—Filmfare Critics Award for Best Actress – Malayalam; Won—Vanitha Film Awards for Best Actress; Nominated—Filmfare Award for Best Actress – Malayalam; Nominated—Kerala State Film Award for Best Actress
2024	Shaitaan	Jyoti Rishi	Hindi	Nominated—Showsha Reel Awards 2025 for Best Supporting Actress - Popular Choice
2024	Srikanth	Devika Malvade	Hindi	Won—Showsha Reel Awards 2025 for Best Supporting Actress - Popular Choice
2024	Srikanth	Devika Malvade	Hindi	Nominated—IIFA Award for Best Supporting Actress
2026	System	Sarika Rawat	Hindi	Won– Best Actress award at the Iconic Gold Streaming Awards; Asian Academy Creative Award for Best Actress in a Supporting Role
2026	Scene	Inba's imagination of Maya	Tamil	Cameo appearance

== Television ==
List of Jyothika television credits
Year	Title	Role	Language	Network	Notes
2025	Dabba Cartel	Varuna Panniker	Hindi	Netflix	
2025	Dabba Cartel	Varuna Panniker	Hindi	Netflix	Won—OTTPlay Awards for Best Supporting Actor (Female)

== Short films ==
List of Jyothika short film credits
Year	Title	Role	Language	Notes
2006	Nimisham	Nimisha	Malayalam	Short film directed by Revathy S. Varmha
2008	Herova? Zerova?	Herself	Tamil	Docudrama
2017	Manadhaal Inaivom, Maatrathai Varaverppom	Jo	Tamil	Directed By Sudha Kongara Brand Shorts For Zee Tamil

== See also ==
- List of awards and nominations received by Jyothika
- 2D Entertainment
