= List of awards and nominations received by Jyothika =

Jyothika awards and nominations
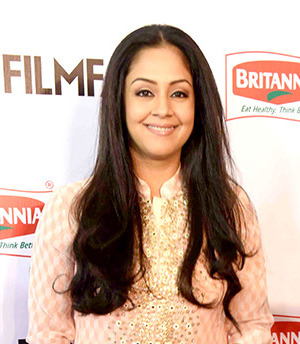
- Jyothika at Filmfare Awards South, 2015
Awards and nominations
Award	Wins	Nominations
National Film Awards	1	1
Filmfare Awards South	5	20
ITFA	1	1
Tamil Nadu State Film Awards	11	11
South Indian International Movie Awards	1	4
IIFA Utsavam Awards	0	1
Vijay Awards	0	2
Edison Awards (India)	1	2
Ananda Vikatan Cinema Award	1	2
Zee Cine Tamil Awards	0	2
Cinema Express Awards	2	3
Other awards and honours	5	5
Film festival honours	4	4
Filmfare Awards	0	1
Zee Cine Awards	0	1

Totals (Note: Certain award groups do not simply award one winner. They acknowledge several different recipients, have runners-up, and have third place. Since this is a specific recognition and is different from losing an award, runner-up mentions are considered wins in this award tally. For simplification and to avoid errors, each award in this list has been presumed to have had a prior nomination.)
- Wins: 43
- Nominations: 73

Jyothika is an Indian actress who predominantly appears in Tamil films. She also acted in some Telugu, Malayalam, Kannada and Hindi films. She won one National Award, five Filmfare Awards, eleven Tamil Nadu State Film Awards, two Cinema Express Awards, two South Indian International Movie Awards, two International Tamil Film Awards and four Dinakaran Awards. She is also a recipient of the Kalaimamani Award. She is regarded as one of the most prolific actresses in Tamil cinema. She has been ranked among the best actresses of South India by The Times of India and was referred as one of the Superstar women in Indian Cinema by The Hindu.

She debuted in Bollywood in the Hindi film Doli Saja Ke Rakhna (1997), directed by Priyadarshan. She starred in her first Tamil film Vaalee (1999) and her first Telugu film Tagore (2003), opposite Chiranjeevi. She received her first Filmfare Award for Vaalee (1999) as Filmfare Award for Best Female Debut – South. She was awarded the Filmfare Best Tamil Actress Award for Kushi (2000). A string of successful films followed and gained prominence for her performances in Kushi (2000), Dumm Dumm Dumm (2001), Poovellam Un Vasam (2001), Kaakha Kaakha (2004), Perazhagan (2004), Chandramukhi (2005) and Mozhi, (2007), for the latter three she won Tamil Nadu State Film Award for Best Actress.For the movie, Mozhi, she was in the final three for National Film Award for Best Actress for her outstanding performance, however she lost the award to Umashree for the Kannada film Gulabi Talkies. She has a record of holding maximum number of nominations with 16 for Best Tamil Actress at South Filmfare Awards.

Jyothika left the industry at the peak of her career marrying Tamil actor Suriya on 11 September 2006, after being engaged in a relationship for several years, and whom she was paired with in seven films. She made a comeback in the film 36 Vayadhinile (2015) where her performance was given strong reviews and she received Tamil Nadu State Film Award for Best Actress and Filmfare Critics Award for Best Actress – South for the movie. By Winning her fourth Best Actress Award at Tamil Nadu State Film Awards, she broke the record of winning most Best Actress Title till date with four as her record. After the success of 36 Vayadhinile, she appeared in a series of women centric films like Magalir Mattum (2017), Naachiyaar (2018), Kaatrin Mozhi (2018), Raatchasi (2019), and Ponmagal Vandhal (2020) and also played a lead female role in Mani Ratnam's multi-starrer Chekka Chivantha Vaanam (2018). She made a comeback to Malayalam and Hindi film industry with critically acclaimed performances in Kaathal – The Core (2023) with Mammootty for which she won her fifth Filmfare Awards South in the category Best Actress – Malayalam and Shaitaan (2024) with Ajay Devgn and R. Madhavan. The latter became the fourth highest grossing Indian film of 2024.

== National Film Awards ==
Year	Category	Film	Result	Ref.
2020	Best Feature Film (producer, along with Suriya and Guneet Monga)	Soorarai Pottru	Won	

== IIFA Utsavam Awards ==
Year	Artist/Work	Category	Result	Ref.
2015	36 Vayathinile	Performance in a Leading Role – Female Tamil	Nominated	
2024	Kaathal – The Core	Performance in a Leading Role – Female Malayalam	Nominated	
2024	Kaathal – The Core	IIFA Utsavam for Best Actress - Critics	Won	

== Kalaimamani Awards ==
Year	Artist/Work	Category	Result	Ref.
2005	Contribution of Tamil Cinema	Kalaimamani	Won	

== Ananda Vikatan Cinema Awards ==
Year	Artist/Work	Category	Result	Ref.
2007	Pachaikili Muthucharam	Best Villain - Female	Won	
2019	Raatchasi	Best Actress	Nominated	
2021	Udanpirappe	Best Actress	Nominated	

== Tamil Nadu State Film Awards ==
=== For Best Actress Award Category ===
Year	Artist/Work	Category	Result	Ref.
2004	Perazhagan	Best Actress	Won	
2005	Chandramukhi	Best Actress	Won	
2007	Mozhi	Best Actress	Won	
2015	36 Vayadhinile	Best Actress	Won	
2018	Chekka Chivantha Vaanam	Best Actress	Won	

=== For Best Film production /co-producer Award Category ===
Year	Film	Category	Result	Ref.
2015	Pasanga 2	Best Film: Second Prize	Won	
2015	36 Vayadhinile	Best Film About Women's Empowerment	Won	
2018	Kadaikutty Singam	Best Film: Second Prize	Won	
2019	Ponmagal Vandhal	Best Film About Women's Empowerment	Won	
2020	Soorarai Pottru	Best Film: Second Prize	Won	
2021	Jai Bhim	Best Film	Won	

== Edison Awards (India) ==
Year	Artist/Work	Category	Result	Ref.
2019	Raatchasi	Best Actress	Won	
2019	Jackpot	Favourite Heroine	Nominated	
2021	Ponmagal Vandhal	Best Actress	Won	

== Filmfare Awards South ==
Year	Artist/Work	Category	Language	Result	Ref.
1999	Vaalee	Best Debut Actress	Tamil	Won	
1999	Poovellam Kettuppar	Best Actress	Tamil	Nominated	
2000	Kushi	Best Actress	Tamil	Won	
2001	Poovellam Un Vasam	Best Actress	Tamil	Nominated	
2002	Nagarahavu	Best Actress	Kannada	Nominated	
2003	Kaaka Kaaka	Best Actress	Tamil	Nominated	
2003	Dhool	Best Actress	Tamil	Nominated	
2004	Perazhagan	Best Actress	Tamil	Nominated	
2004	Manmadhan	Best Actress	Tamil	Nominated	
2004	Mass	Best Actress	Telugu	Nominated	
2005	Chandramukhi	Best Actress	Tamil	Nominated	
2006	Vettaiyaadu Vilaiyaadu	Best Actress	Tamil	Nominated	
2006	Sillunu Oru Kaadhal	Best Actress	Tamil	Nominated	
2006	Shock	Best Actress	Telugu	Nominated	
2007	Mozhi	Best Actress	Tamil	Nominated	
2009	Seetha Kalyanam	Best Actress	Malayalam	Nominated	
2015	36 Vayathinile	Best Actress	Tamil	Nominated	
2015	36 Vayathinile	Critics Best Actress	Tamil	Won	
2017	Magalir Mattum	Best Actress	Tamil	Nominated	
2019	Kaatrin Mozhi	Best Actress	Tamil	Nominated	
2022	Ponmagal Vandhaal	Best Actress	Tamil	Nominated	
2022	Udanpirappe	Best Actress	Tamil	Nominated	
2022	Jai Bhim	Best Film	Tamil	Won	
2024	Kaathal – The Core	Best Actress	Malayalam	Nominated	
2024	Kaathal – The Core	Critics Best Actress	Malayalam	Won	

== Filmfare Awards ==
Year	Artist/Work	Category	Result	Ref.
1998	Doli Saja Ke Rakhna	Best Female Debut	Nominated	

== International Tamil Film Awards ==
Year	Artist/Work	Category	Result	Ref.
2003	Dhool	Best Actress	Won	
2004	Kaaka Kaaka	Best Actress - Critics	Won	

== Dinakaran Film Awards ==
Year	Artist/Work	Category	Result	Ref.
1999	Vaalee	Best Debut Actress	Won	
2000	Khushi	Best Actress	Won	
2004	Perazhagan	Best Actress	Won	
2005	Chandramukhi	Best Actress	Won	

== Zee Cine Awards ==
Year	Artist/Work	Category	Result	Ref.
1999	Doli Saja Ke Rakhna	Zee Cine Award for Best Female Debut	Nominated	

== South Indian International Movie Awards ==
Year	Artist/Work	Category	Language	Result	Ref.
2015	36 Vayathinile	Best Actress	Tamil	Nominated	
2017	Magalir Mattum	Best Actress	Tamil	Nominated	
2018	Kaatrin Mozhi	Best Actress	Tamil	Nominated	
2019	Raatchasi	Best Actress	Tamil	Nominated	
2021	Soorarai Pottru	Best Film Producer – Tamil	Tamil	Won	
2024	Kaathal – The Core	Best Actress	Malayalam	Nominated	
2024	Kaathal – The Core	South Indian International Movie Awards for Best Actress - Critics	Malayalam	Won	

== Vijay Awards ==
Year	Artist/Work	Category	Result	Ref.
2007	Mozhi	Best Actress	Nominated	
2007	Mozhi	Favourite Heroine	Nominated	

== Cinema Express Awards ==
Year	Artist/Work	Category	Result	Ref.
1999	Vaalee	Best Newface Actress of the Year	Won	
2000	Kushi & Rhythm	Most Sensational Actress	Won	
2000	Rhythm	Best Onscreen Pair (alongside Arjun)	Nominated	
2001	Poovellam Un Vasam	Best Actress – Tamil	Won	

== Kerala State Film Awards ==
Year	Award	Nominated work	Role	Result	Ref.
2023	Kerala State Film Award for Best Actress	Kaathal: The Core	Omana Philip Mathew	Nominated	

== Other awards and honours ==
Year	Category	Movie/Work	Award/rank	Ref.
2002	Udaya Film Award for Best Female Actor	Nagarahavu	Won	
2005	Film Fans' Association Award for Best Actress	Chandramukhi	Won	
2016	Behindwoods Gold Medal Best Actress Popular & Best Debut Producer (2D Entertainment, along with Suriya)	36 Vayathinile	Won	
2024	IIFA Award for Best Supporting Actress	Srikanth	Nominated	
2025	Showsha Reel Awards 2025 for Best Supporting Actress - Popular Choice	Srikanth	Won	
2025	Showsha Reel Awards 2025 for Best Supporting Actress - Popular Choice	Shaitaan	Nominated	
2025	OTTPlay Awards for Best Supporting Actor (Female)	Dabba Cartel	Won	
2026	Best Actress award at the Iconic Gold Streaming Awards	System	Won	
2026	Asian Academy Creative Award for Best Actress in a Supporting Role	System	Won	
2020	Dadasaheb Phalke film festival South Award for Best Tamil Actress	Raatchasi	Won	

== As film producer ==
Year	Film	Award	Category	Result	Ref.
2021–22	Jai Bhim	Norway Tamil Film Festival Awards	Best Film	Won	
