= 47th Filmfare Awards South =

Award ceremony for South Indian films

- Date: 22 April 2000
- Site: Jawaharlal Nehru Stadium, Chennai, Tamil Nadu, India

The 47th Filmfare Awards South ceremony honouring the winners and nominees of the best of South Indian cinema in films released 1999, is an event that was held at the Jawaharlal Nehru Stadium, Chennai, on 22 April 2000.

== Main awards ==
=== Kannada cinema ===
Best Film	Best Director
Upendra -H. C. Srinivas	Upendra – Upendra
Best Actor	Best Actress
Shiva Rajkumar – A.K.47	Tara – Kanooru Heggadithi
Best Music Director
K. Kalyan – Chandramukhi Pranasakhi

=== Malayalam cinema ===
Best Film	Best Director
Veendum Chila Veettukaryangal	Shyamaprasad – Agnisakshi
Best Actor	Best Actress
Mohanlal – Vanaprastham	Manju Warrier – Pathram
Best Music Director
Vidyasagar – Niram

=== Tamil cinema ===
Best Film	Best Director
Sethu	Bala – Sethu
Best Actor	Best Actress
Ajith Kumar – Vaalee	Ramya Krishnan – Padayappa
Best Music Director
A. R. Rahman – Mudhalvan

=== Telugu cinema ===
Best Film	Best Director
Raja	B. Gopal – Samarasimha Reddy
Best Actor	Best Actress
Chiranjeevi – Sneham Kosam	Soundarya – Raja
Best Music Director
S. A. Rajkumar – Raja

== Technical Awards ==
Best Cinematographer: Santosh Sivan – Vanaprastham	Best Playback Singer: Vasundhara Das - Mudhalvan (for "Shakalaka Baby")

== Special awards ==
Lifetime Achievement: Pandari Bai; Sundaram	Filmfare Award for Best Female Debut – South: Jyothika for Vaalee
Special award: Vikram for Sethu
