= Vatsala Rajagopal =

Indian actress (1933–2026)

- Born: 25 December 1933
- Died: 30 October 2026 (aged 92)
- Occupation: Actress
- Years active: 1979–2015

Vatsala Rajagopal (25 December 1933 – 30 October 2026) was an Indian actress. She started her acting career as a stage artist in 1979 and acted in 450 plays in 25 years. Rajagopal acted in many Tamil television serials from the days when they were produced in the 1990s. She also acted in Tamil films including Roja, Sathi Leelavathi, Rhythm and Kaalamellam Kadhal Vaazhga.

Rajagopal died on 30 October 2026, at the age of 92.

== Filmography ==
Year	Film	Role	Notes
1992	Roja	Roja's paternal grandmother	
1995	Sathi Leelavathi	Ambujam Maami	
1996	Aur Ek Prem Kahani	Dr. Elavathi	Hindi film
1996	Selva	Church mother	
1997	Kaalamellam Kadhal Vaazhga	Kausalya's grandmother	
2000	Rhythm	Karthikeyan's Mother	
2003	Winner	Neelaveni's grandmother	
2003	Julie Ganapathi	Vijaya's mother	
2005	Anniyan	Ambi's grandmother	
2005	Mazhai	Shailaja's grandmother	
2006	Pattiyal	Sandhya's grandmother	
2007	Mozhi	Archana's grandmother	
2007	Sabari	Nandhini's grandmother	
2007	Thullal	Shruthika's grandmother	
2008	Dhaam Dhoom	Gautham's grandmother	
2008	Jayamkondaan		
2010	Adhurs	Chari's adoptive grandmother	Telugu film
2011	Udhayan	Udhayan and Vasanth's grandmother	
2013	Sonna Puriyathu	Shiva's Grandmother	
2013	Kalyana Samayal Saadham	Meera's grandmother	

== Serials ==
Year	Title	Role	Channel
1996–1998	Costly Mappilai		Sun TV
1996–1998	Kadhal Pagadai		Sun TV
1999–2001	Chithi	Ambujam Mami	Sun TV
2000	Kadhai Neram		Sun TV
2003	Salanam		Vijay TV
2003–2005	Aadugiran Kannan	Rukhmini's Grandmother	Sun TV
2003–2006	Anandham		Sun TV
2004–2005	Sorgam	Nurse/Abhirami's maid	Sun TV
2005–2006	My Dear Bhootham	Gautam and Gowri's Grandmother	Sun TV
2007–2008	Manjal Magimai		Kalaignar TV
2007–2009	Girija M.A	Naveen's Grandmother	Jaya TV
2007–2012	Vasantham	Jeeva's Grandmother	Sun TV
2008–2011	Magal	Rajeshwari	Sun TV
2012–2014	Mundhanai Mudichu	Kandhaswamy's mother	Sun TV
2013–2015	Puthu Kavithai	Kavya, Aravind and Divya's Grand Mother	Vijay TV
2014	Bhairavi Aavigalukku Priyamanaval	Guest appearance	Sun TV
2014–2015	Uyirmei		Zee Tamizh
