= Filmfare Award for Best Actress – Tamil =

Indian annual film award

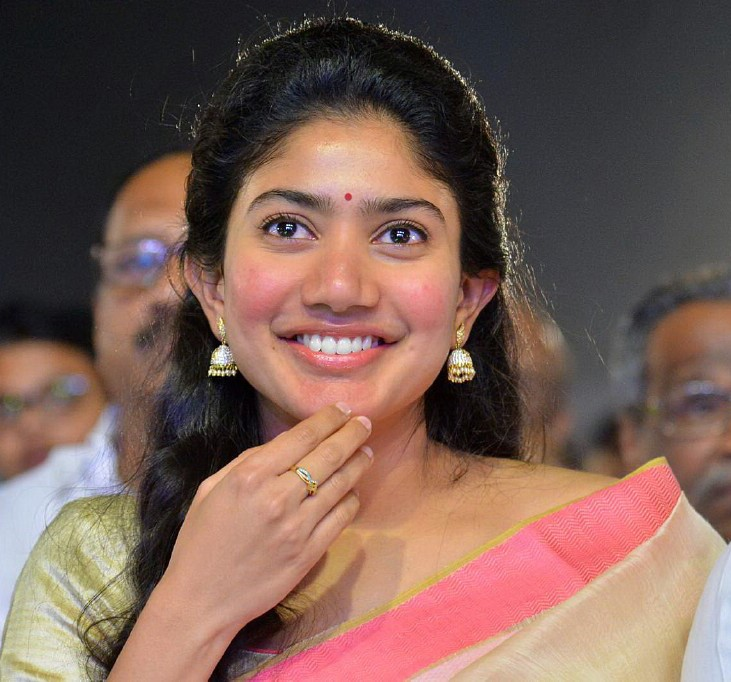
- The 2024 recipient: Sai Pallavi
- Awarded for: Best Performance by an Actress in a leading role in Tamil films
- Country: India
- Presented by: Filmfare
- First award: J. Jayalalithaa for Pattikada Pattanama (1972)
- Currently held by: Sai Pallavi for Amaran (2024)
- Website: http://filmfareawards.indiatimes.com/

The Filmfare Award for Best Actress – Tamil is given by the Filmfare magazine as part of its annual Filmfare Awards South for Tamil films. The awards were extended to "Best Actress" in 1972. The year indicates the year of release of the film.

== Superlatives ==
Superlative	Recipient(s)	Record
Most wins	Sujatha, Radhika Sarathkumar, Revathi, Nayanthara	3
Most consecutive wins	Sujatha, Revathi	3
Most nominations	Jyothika	16
Most consecutive nominations	Jyothika	8
Most nominations without a win	Khushbu Sundar	7
Youngest winner	Malvika Nair	16
Youngest nominee	Sridevi	14
Oldest winner	Trisha Krishnan	36
Oldest nominee	Revathi	55

- Actresses Sujatha won the most awards in the 1970s with three. Saritha and Radhika Sarathkumar won the award twice in the 1980s, and Revathi won three times in the 1990s for the most in that decade. Laila had two wins in the 2000s, while Nayanthara won the award thrice in the 2010s. Sai Pallavi leads the 2020s with two wins.
- Shoba, Archana and Priyamani have won Filmfare award for Best Actress Tamil and National Film Award for Best Actress for their performances in Pasi (1979), Veedu (1988) and Paruthiveeran (2006), respectively while [Revathi] have won National Film Award for Best Actress in a Supporting Role for her role in Thevar Magan.
- Jyothika and Trisha Krishnan have won both the Filmfare Award for Best Actress – Tamil and Filmfare Critics Award for Best Actress – Tamil
- Radhika Sarathkumar, Simran and Jyothika have won awards in 2 different categories other than this category. Radhika Sarathkumar won the Filmfare Lifetime Achievement Award in 2014 and the Filmfare Best Supporting Actress Award in 2015. Simran has won both Debut award in 1997 and Best Supporting Actress Award in 2008, while Jyothika won Debut award in 1999 and Filmfare Critics Award for Best Actress – South in 2015.
- Radhika Sarathkumar, Simran and Parvathy Thiruvothu have won both the Filmfare Award for Best Actress – Tamil and Filmfare Best Supporting Actress Award -Tamil
- Aishwarya Lekshmi is the only actress to receive Best Actress Nominations in three different languages namely Malayalam, Tamil, Telugu in a same year (2023).
- J. Jayalalithaa, Revathi and Samantha Ruth Prabhu are the only three actresses to win both Filmfare Award for Best Actress – Tamil and Filmfare Award for Best Actress – Telugu in the same year for their performances in the year 1972, 1992 and 2012 respectively. Lakshmi and Poornima Bhagyaraj won Filmfare Award for Best Actress – Tamil and Filmfare Award for Best Actress – Malayalam for their performances in the same year (1974 and 1982 respectively).
- Eight actresses have won for their debut Tamil films, in chronological order Manisha Koirala (1995), Shruti (1996), Sandhya (2004), Bhavana (2006), Parvathy Thiruvothu (2008), Malavika Nair (2014), Ritika Singh (2016) and Nimisha Sajayan (2023).

== Multiple wins ==
The following individuals have received multiple Best Actress awards:

Wins	Actress
3	Sujatha, Radhika Sarathkumar, Revathi, Nayanthara
2	J. Jayalalithaa, Lakshmi, Saritha, Laila, Anjali, Sai Pallavi

== Multiple nominations ==
The following individuals have received multiple Best Actress nominations:

Nominations	Actress
16	Jyothika
11	Revathi
8	Saritha, Radhika Sarathkumar
7	Lakshmi, Sridevi, Khushbu Sundar, Nayanthara, Trisha
6	Asin, Sujatha, Meena, Sneha

== Winners and nominees ==
Table key
‡	Indicates the winner

=== 1970s ===
Year	Actress	Film	Role(s)	Ref.
1972 (20th)	J. Jayalalithaa ‡	Pattikada Pattanama	Kalpana	
1973 (21st)	J. Jayalalithaa ‡	Suryagandhi	Radha	
1974 (22nd)	Lakshmi ‡	Dikkatra Parvathi	Parvathi	
1974 (22nd)	Sujatha	Aval Oru Thodar Kathai	Kavitha	
1974 (22nd)	Sumithra	Avalum Penn Thaane	Sita	
1975 (23rd)	Sujatha ‡	Uravu Solla Oruvan	Sumathi	
1975 (23rd)	K. R. Vijaya	Aayirathil Oruthi	Janaki	
1975 (23rd)	Srividya	Apoorva Raagangal	Bhairavi	
1976 (24th)	Sujatha ‡	Annakili	Annakili	
1976 (24th)	Aalam	Manmadha Leelai	Rekha	
1976 (24th)	J. Jayalalithaa	Chitra Pournami	Rani	
1976 (24th)	Rani Chandra	Bhadrakali		
1976 (24th)	Sridevi	Moondru Mudichu	Selvi	
1977 (25th)	Sujatha ‡	Avargal	Anu	
1977 (25th)	Lakshmi	Sila Nerangalil Sila Manithargal	Ganga	
1977 (25th)	Sridevi	16 Vayathinile	Mayil	
1977 (25th)	Sripriya	Aattukara Alamelu	Alamelu	
1977 (25th)	Sumithra	Bhuvana Oru Kelvi Kuri	Bhuvana	
1978 (26th)	Latha ‡	Vattathukkul Chaduram	Anu	
1978 (26th)	Lakshmi	Oru Nadigai Natakam Parkiral	Kalyani	
1978 (26th)	Radhika Sarathkumar	Kizhakke Pogum Rail	Panchali	
1978 (26th)	Sridevi	Sigappu Rojakkal	Sharada	
1978 (26th)	Sripriya	Aval Appadithan	Manju	
1979 (27th)	Shoba ‡	Pasi	Kuppamma	
1979 (27th)	Ashwini	Uthiripookkal	Lakshmi	
1979 (27th)	Jaya Prada	Ninaithale Inikkum	Sona	
1979 (27th)	Sridevi	Pagalil Oru Iravu	Bindhu	
1979 (27th)	Sripriya	Neeya?	Naga Rani	

=== 1980s ===
Year	Actress	Film	Role(s)	Ref.
1980 (28th)	Saritha ‡	Vandichakkaram	Vadivu	
1980 (28th)	Lakshmi	Avan Aval Adhu		
1980 (28th)	Sridevi	Varumayin Niram Sigappu	Devi	
1980 (28th)	Sripriya	Avan Aval Adhu		
1980 (28th)	Suhasini	Nenjathai Killathe	Viji	
1981 (29th)	Sridevi ‡	Meendum Kokila	Kokila	
1981 (29th)	Saritha	Thanneer Thanneer	Sevanthi	
1981 (29th)	Suhasini	Palaivana Solai	Geetha	
1982 (30th)	Poornima Bhagyaraj ‡	Payanangal Mudivathillai	Radha	
1982 (30th)	Saritha	Agni Sakshi	Kannamma	
1982 (30th)	Sridevi	Moondram Pirai	Bhagyalakshmi / Viji	
1982 (30th)	Sripriya	Vazhve Mayam	Radha	
1982 (30th)	Suhasini	Gopurangal Saivathillai	Arukkani	
1983 (31st)	Lakshmi ‡	Unmaigal		
1983 (31st)	Revathi	Mann Vasanai	Muthupechi	
1983 (31st)	Saritha	Malaiyoor Mambattiyan	Kannaathaa	
1983 (31st)	Sujatha	Sumangali	Thulasi Vedarathnam	
1983 (31st)	Urvashi	Mundhanai Mudichu	Parimala	
1984 (32nd)	Saritha ‡	Achamillai Achamillai	Thenmozhi	
1984 (32nd)	Lakshmi	Sirai	Bhagirathi	
1984 (32nd)	Nalini	Nooravathu Naal	Devi	
1984 (32nd)	Revathi	Pudhumai Penn	Seetha	
1984 (32nd)	Sujatha	Alaya Deepam		
1985 (33rd)	Radha ‡	Muthal Mariyathai	Kuyil	
1985 (33rd)	Kalpana	Chinna Veedu	Bhagyalakshmi	
1985 (33rd)	Nadhiya	Poove Poochooda Vaa	Sundari	
1985 (33rd)	Revathi	Kanni Rasi	Dhanalakshmi	
1985 (33rd)	Saritha	Kalyana Agathigal	Ammulu	
1985 (33rd)	Suhasini	Sindhu Bhairavi	Sindhu	
1986 (34th)	Radhika Sarathkumar ‡	Dharma Devathai	Jhansi Rani	
1986 (34th)	Amala	Mythili Ennai Kaathali	Mythili	
1986 (34th)	Lakshmi	Samsaram Adhu Minsaram	Uma	
1986 (34th)	Nadhiya	Nilave Malare	Janaki / Sheela	
1986 (34th)	Radha	Amman Kovil Kizhakale	Kanmani	
1986 (34th)	Revathi	Mouna Ragam	Divya	
1987 (35th)	Radhika Sarathkumar ‡	Neethikku Thandanai	Chithra	
1987 (35th)	Amala	Vedham Pudhithu	Vaidehi	
1987 (35th)	Archana	Rettai Vaal Kuruvi	Tulasi	
1987 (35th)	Nadhiya	Anbulla Appa	Radha	
1987 (35th)	Radha	Enga Chinna Rasa	Rukmini	
1988 (36th)	Archana ‡	Veedu	Sudha	
1988 (36th)	Radhika Sarathkumar	Poonthotta Kaavalkaaran	Sivagami	
1988 (36th)	Saritha	Poo Potha Nandavanam		
1988 (36th)	Shobana	Idhu Namma Aalu	Banu	
1988 (36th)	Suhasini	En Bommukutty Ammavukku	Lakshmi	
1989 (37th)	Bhanupriya ‡	Aararo Aariraro	Meenakshi	
1989 (37th)	Radhika Sarathkumar	Thendral Sudum	Radhika	
1989 (37th)	Geetha	Pudhu Pudhu Arthangal	Gowri	
1989 (37th)	Kanaka	Karakattakkaran	Kamakshi	
1989 (37th)	Seetha	Pudhea Paadhai	sita	

=== 1990s ===
Year	Actress	Film	Role(s)	Ref.
1990 (38th)	Radhika Sarathkumar ‡	Keladi Kannmanii	Sharada	
1990 (38th)	Gautami	Namma Ooru Poovatha	Poovatha	
1990 (38th)	Revathi	Anjali	Chitra	
1990 (38th)	Revathi	Kizhakku Vaasal	Thaayamma	
1990 (38th)	Urvashi	Michael Madana Kama Rajan	Thiripurasundari	
1991 (39th)	Gautami ‡	Nee Pathi Naan Pathi	Nivedha	
1991 (39th)	Bhanupriya	Azhagan	Priya Ranjan	
1991 (39th)	Heera	Idhayam	Geetha	
1991 (39th)	Jayabharathi	Marupakkam	Janaki	
1991 (39th)	Khushbu Sundar	Chinna Thambi	Nandhini	
1992 (40th)	Revathi ‡	Thevar Magan	Panchavarnam	
1992 (40th)	Khushbu Sundar	Rickshaw Mama	Bhuvana	
1992 (40th)	Madhoo	Roja	Roja	
1992 (40th)	Sukanya	Chinna Gounder	Deivaanai	
1992 (40th)	Vijayashanti	Mannan	Shanthi Devi	
1993 (41st)	Revathi ‡	Marupadiyum	Thulasi	
1993 (41st)	Bhanupriya	Gokulam	Mary / Gayathri	
1993 (41st)	Khushbu Sundar	Jaathi Malli	Sriranjini	
1993 (41st)	Meena	Yajaman	Vaitheeswari Vaanavarayan	
1993 (41st)	Priya Raman	Valli	Valli	
1993 (41st)	Radhika Sarathkumar	Kizhakku Cheemayile	Virumaayi	
1994 (42nd)	Revathi ‡	Priyanka	Priyanka	
1994 (42nd)	Khushbu Sundar	Nattamai	Lakshmi	
1994 (42nd)	Nagma	Kaadhalan	Shruthi	
1994 (42nd)	Rajashree	Karuthamma	Karuthamma	
1994 (42nd)	Sukanya	Mahanadhi	Yamuna	
1994 (42nd)	Urvashi	Magalir Mattum	Janaki	
1995 (43rd)	Manisha Koirala ‡	Bombay	Shaila banu	
1995 (43rd)	Kalpana	Sathi Leelavathi	Leelavathi	
1995 (43rd)	Khushbu Sundar	Kolangal	Ganga	
1995 (43rd)	Meena	Muthu	Ranganayagi	
1995 (43rd)	Radhika Sarathkumar	Pasumpon	Nachiyar	
1995 (43rd)	Suvaluxmi	Aasai	saraswathi	
1996 (44th)	Shruti ‡	Kalki	Kalki	
1996 (44th)	Devayani	Kadhal Kottai	Kamali	
1996 (44th)	Meena	Avvai Shanmugi	Janaki	
1996 (44th)	Sangita	Poove Unakkaga	Priyadarshini	
1996 (44th)	Suvaluxmi	Gokulathil Seethai	Nila	
1996 (44th)	Urvashi	Irattai Roja	Uma	
1997 (45th)	Meena ‡	Bharathi Kannamma	Kannamma	
1997 (45th)	Devayani	Surya Vamsam	Nandhini	
1997 (45th)	Khushbu Sundar	Paththini		
1997 (45th)	Meena	Porkkaalam	Maragadham	
1997 (45th)	Shalini	Kadhalukku Mariyadhai	Mini	
1998 (46th)	Kausalya ‡	Pooveli	Mahalakshmi	
1998 (46th)	Khushbu Sundar	Simmarasi	Sivagami Jayanthi	
1998 (46th)	Rambha	Ninaithen Vandhai	Swapna Gokula Krishnan	
1998 (46th)	Revathi	Thalaimurai	Nachiyar	
1998 (46th)	Roja	Unnidathil Ennai Koduthen	Radha	
1999 (47th)	Ramya Krishnan ‡	Padayappa	Neelambari	
1999 (47th)	Abitha	Sethu	Abitha Kujalambal	
1999 (47th)	Devayani	Nee Varuvai Ena	Nandhini	
1999 (47th)	Simran	Vaalee	Priya	
1999 (47th)	Shalini	Amarkkalam	Mohana	

=== 2000s ===
Year	Actress	Role(s)	Film	Ref.
2000 (48th)	Jyothika ‡	Kushi	Jennifer / Selvi	
2000 (48th)	Devayani	Bharathi	Chellamal Bharathi	
2000 (48th)	Meena	Rhythm	Chitra Srikanth	
2000 (48th)	Shalini	Alai Payuthey	Dr.Sakthi	
2001 (49th)	Laila ‡	Nandhaa	Kalyani	
2001 (49th)	Devayani	Aanandham	Bharathi	
2001 (49th)	Jyothika	Poovellam Un Vaasam	Chella	
2002 (50th)	Simran ‡	Kannathil Muthamittal	Indira Thiruchelvan	
2002 (50th)	Nandita Das	Azhagi	Dhanalakshmi aka Dhanam	
2002 (50th)	Soundarya	Ivan	Dikshanya	
2002 (50th)	Sneha	April Maadhathil	Shwetha	
2003 (51st)	Laila ‡	Pithamagan	Manju	
2003 (51st)	Jyothika	Dhool	Eeswari	
2003 (51st)	Jyothika	Kaakha Kaakha	Maya Anpbuselvan	
2003 (51st)	Sneha	Parthiban Kanavu	Sathya and Janani	
2004 (52nd)	Sandhya ‡	Kaadhal	Aishwarya	
2004 (52nd)	Asin	M. Kumaran S/O Mahalakshmi	Mythili	
2004 (52nd)	Jyothika	Perazhagan	Priya / Shenbagam	
2004 (52nd)	Jyothika	Manmadhan	Mythili	
2004 (52nd)	Reema Sen	Chellamae	Mythili	
2005 (53rd)	Asin ‡	Ghajini	Kalpana	
2005 (53rd)	Asin	Majaa	Seetha Lakshmi	
2005 (53rd)	Jyothika	Chandramukhi	Ganga Senthilnathan	
2005 (53rd)	Meera Jasmine	Kasthuri Maan	Umashankari Vetrivel	
2005 (53rd)	Sadha	Anniyan	Nandhini	
2006 (54th)	Bhavana ‡	Chithiram Pesuthadi	Charu	
2006 (54th)	Jyothika	Sillunu Oru Kaadhal	Kundavi Gowtham	
2006 (54th)	Jyothika	Vettaiyaadu Vilaiyaadu	Aaradhana	
2006 (54th)	Sandhya	Dishyum	Sindhya	
2006 (54th)	Sneha	Pudhupettai	Krishnaveni	
2007 (55th)	Priyamani ‡	Paruthiveeran	Muththazhagu	
2007 (55th)	Sadha	Unnale Unnale	Jhansi	
2007 (55th)	Asin	Pokkiri	Shruthi	
2007 (55th)	Jyothika	Mozhi	Archana	
2007 (55th)	Nayanthara	Billa	Sasha	
2007 (55th)	Tamannaah Bhatia	Kalloori	Shobana	
2008 (56th)	Parvathy Thiruvothu ‡	Poo	Maari	
2008 (56th)	Asin	Dasavathaaram	Andal	
2008 (56th)	Genelia D'Souza	Santosh Subramaniam	Hasini	
2008 (56th)	Nayanthara	Yaaradi Nee Mohini	Keerthi	
2008 (56th)	Sneha	Pirivom Santhippom	Visalatchi	
2008 (56th)	Swathi Reddy	Subramaniapuram	Thulasi	
2008 (56th)	Trisha Krishnan	Abhiyum Naanum	Abi	
2009 (57th)	Pooja Umashankar ‡	Naan Kadavul	Hamshavalli	
2009 (57th)	Padmapriya Janakiraman	Pokkisham	Nadhira	
2009 (57th)	Sneha	Achchamundu! Achchamundu!	Malini Kumar	
2009 (57th)	Sriya Reddy	Kanchivaram	Annam	
2009 (57th)	Tamannaah Bhatia	Kanden Kadhalai	Anjali	

=== 2010s ===
Year	Actress	Role(s)	Film	Ref.
2010 (58th)	Anjali ‡	Angadi Theru	Sermakkani	
2010 (58th)	Amala Paul	Mynaa	Mynaa	
2010 (58th)	Nayanthara	Boss Engira Bhaskaran	Chandrika Shanmugasundaram	
2010 (58th)	Reema Sen	Aayirathil Oruvan	Anitha Pandiyan	
2010 (58th)	Tamannaah Bhatia	Paiyaa	Charulatha	
2010 (58th)	Trisha Krishnan	Vinnaithaandi Varuvaayaa	Jessy	
2011 (59th)	Anjali ‡	Engaeyum Eppothum	Manimegalai Ramasamy	
2011 (59th)	Anushka Shetty	Deiva Thirumagal	Anuradha Ragunathan	
2011 (59th)	Asin	Kaavalan	Meera	
2011 (59th)	Ineya	Vaagai Sooda Vaa	Madhi	
2011 (59th)	Richa Gangopadhyay	Mayakkam Enna	Yamini	
2011 (59th)	Shruti Haasan	7 Aum Arivu	Subha	
2012 (60th)	Samantha Ruth Prabhu ‡	Neethaane En Ponvasantham	Nithya Vasudevan	
2012 (60th)	Amala Paul	Kadhalil Sodhappuvadhu Yeppadi	Parvathi	
2012 (60th)	Lakshmi Menon	Kumki	Alli	
2012 (60th)	Shruti Haasan	3	Janani	
2012 (60th)	Sunaina	Neerparavai	Esther	
2013 (61st)	Nayanthara ‡	Raja Rani	Regina John	
2013 (61st)	Parvathy Thiruvothu	Maryan	Panimalar	
2013 (61st)	Pooja Umashankar	Vidiyum Munn	Rekha	
2013 (61st)	Sneha	Haridas	Amudhavalli	
2013 (61st)	Trisha Krishnan	Endrendrum Punnagai	Priya	
2013 (61st)	Vedhika	Paradesi	Angamma	
2014 (62nd)	Malavika Nair ‡	Cuckoo	Sudhanthirakodi	
2014 (62nd)	Amala Paul	Velaiilla Pattadhari	Shalini	
2014 (62nd)	Catherine Tresa	Madras	Kalaiarasi	
2014 (62nd)	Samantha Ruth Prabhu	Kaththi	Ankitha	
2014 (62nd)	Vedhika	Kaaviya Thalaivan	Vadivambal	
2015 (63rd)	Nayanthara ‡	Naanum Rowdy Dhaan	Kadhambari	
2015 (63rd)	Aishwarya Rajesh	Kaaka Muttai	mother	
2015 (63rd)	Gautami	Papanasam	Rani Suyambulingam	
2015 (63rd)	Jyothika	36 Vayadhinile	Vasanthi Tamizhselvan	
2015 (63rd)	Nithya Menen	O Kadhal Kanmani	Tara Kalingarayar	
2016 (64th)	Ritika Singh ‡	Irudhi Suttru	Ezhil Madhi	
2016 (64th)	Nayanthara	Iru Mugan	Meera George	
2016 (64th)	Samantha Ruth Prabhu	24	Sathya	
2016 (64th)	Samantha Ruth Prabhu	Theri	Mithra Vijaykumar	
2016 (64th)	Tamannaah Bhatia	Devi	Devi	
2016 (64th)	Trisha Krishnan	Kodi	Rudhra	
2017 (65th)	Nayanthara ‡	Aramm	Madhivadhani IAS	
2017 (65th)	Aditi Balan	Aruvi	Aruvi	
2017 (65th)	Amala Paul	Thiruttu Payale 2	Agalya Selvam	
2017 (65th)	Andrea Jeremiah	Taramani	Althea Johnson	
2017 (65th)	Jyothika	Magalir Mattum	Prabhavathi	
2017 (65th)	Revathi	Pa. Pandi	Poothendral	
2018 (66th)	Trisha Krishnan ‡	'96	Janaki Devi	
2018 (66th)	Aishwarya Rajesh	Kanaa	Kousalya Murugesan	
2018 (66th)	Jyothika	Kaatrin Mozhi	Vijayalakshmi Balakrishnan	
2018 (66th)	Nayanthara	Kolamaavu Kokila	Kokila	
2018 (66th)	Sai Pallavi	Maari 2	Anandhi	

=== 2020s ===
Year	Actress	Film	Role(s)	Ref.
2020–2021 (67th)	Lijomol Jose ‡	Jai Bhim	Sengeni Rajakannu	
2020–2021 (67th)	Aishwarya Rajesh	Ka Pae Ranasingam	Ariyanachi Ranasingam	
2020–2021 (67th)	Aparna Balamurali	Soorarai Pottru	Sundari "Bommi" Nedumaaran	
2020–2021 (67th)	Dushara Vijayan	Sarpatta Parambarai	Mariyamma Kabilan	
2020–2021 (67th)	Jyothika	Ponmagal Vandhal	Venba / Angel / Sakthijothi (imagination)	
2020–2021 (67th)	Jyothika	Udanpirappe	Maathangi Sargunam	
2022 (68th)	Sai Pallavi ‡	Gargi	Gargi	
2022 (68th)	Aishwarya Lekshmi	Gatta Kusthi	Keerthi	
2022 (68th)	Aishwarya Rai Bachchan	Ponniyin Selvan: I	Nandini	
2022 (68th)	Keerthy Suresh	Saani Kaayidham	Ponni	
2022 (68th)	Kovai Sarala	Sembi	Veerathayi	
2022 (68th)	Nithya Menen	Thiruchitrambalam	Shobana	
2022 (68th)	Trisha Krishnan	Ponniyin Selvan: I	Kundavai	
2023 (69th)	Nimisha Sajayan ‡	Chiththa	Selvi	
2023 (69th)	Aishwarya Rajesh	Farhana	Farhana / Isha	
2023 (69th)	Aparna Das	Dada	Sindhu	
2023 (69th)	Aishwarya Rai Bachchan	Ponniyin Selvan: 2	Nandini	
2023 (69th)	Shraddha Srinath	Irugapatru	Mithra	
2023 (69th)	Trisha Krishnan	Ponniyin Selvan 2	Kundavai	
2023 (69th)	Bhavani Sre	Viduthalai Part 1	Tamilarasi	
2024 (70th)	Sai Pallavi ‡	Amaran	Indhu Rebecca Varghese	
2024 (70th)	Anna Ben	Kottukkaali	Meena	
2024 (70th)	Keerthy Suresh	Raghu Thatha	Kayalvizhi Pandian	
2024 (70th)	Simran	Andhagan	Simi	
2024 (70th)	Sri Gouri Priya	Lover	Divya Shanmugam	
2024 (70th)	Urvashi	J Baby	J Baby	

== Notes ==
- Ramachandran, T.M. (1973). Film world. Vol. 9.
- Collections. Update Video Publication. 1991.
- The Times of India directory and year book including who's who. Times of India Press. 1984.
