= Jyothika =

Indian actress (born 1978)

- Jyothika in 2019
- Born: Jyothika Sadanah; 18 October 1978 (age 48); Bombay, Maharashtra, India
- Other name: Jyothika Saravanan
- Occupations: Actress; film producer
- Years active: 1998–present
- Works: Full list
- Spouse: Suriya (m. 2006)
- Children: 2
- Family: Sadanah; Sivakumar
- Awards: Full list

Jyothika Saravanan (née Sadanah; born 18 October 1978) is an Indian actress and film producer who predominantly works in Tamil and Hindi films. She has received several accolades including a National Film Award, five Filmfare Awards South, eleven Tamil Nadu State Film Awards (including a record of five Best Actress award) and Kalaimamani Award. Jyothika is regarded among the most prolific actresses in Tamil cinema, and has been ranked among the best South Indian actresses.

The Hindi-language Doli Saja Ke Rakhna (1997), directed by Priyadarshan, was Jyothika's film debut. She starred in her first Tamil film Vaalee (1999) and her first Telugu film Tagore (2003), opposite Chiranjeevi. She received her first Filmfare Award for Best Female Debut - South for the former film. She was awarded the Filmfare Best Tamil Actress Award for Kushi (2000). A string of successful films followed and Jyothika gained prominence for her performances in Kushi (2000), Dumm Dumm Dumm(2001), Poovellam Un Vasam (2001), Kaakha Kaakha (2004), Perazhagan (2004), Chandramukhi (2005) and Mozhi (2007), for the latter three she won Tamil Nadu State Film Award for Best Actress. For the movie, Mozhi, she was in the final three for National Film Award for Best Actress for her outstanding performance, however she lost the award to Umashree for the Kannada film Gulabi Talkies.

She has a record of holding maximum number of nominations with 16 for Best Tamil Actress at South Filmfare Awards.

Jyothika left the industry at the peak of her career after marrying Tamil actor Suriya on 11 September 2006, after being engaged in a relationship for several years, and whom she was paired with in seven films. She made a comeback in the film 36 Vayadhinile (2015) where her performance was given strong reviews and she received Tamil Nadu State Film Award for Best Actress and Filmfare Critics Award for Best Actress – South for the movie. By winning her fourth Best Actress Award at Tamil Nadu State Film Awards, she broke the record of winning most Best Actress Title till date with four as her record. After the success of 36 Vayadhinile, she appeared in a series of women centric films like Magalir Mattum (2017), Naachiyaar (2018), Kaatrin Mozhi (2018), Raatchasi (2019), and Ponmagal Vandhal (2020) and also played a lead female role in Mani Ratnam's multi-starrer Chekka Chivantha Vaanam (2018). She made a comeback to Malayalam and Hindi film industry with critically acclaimed performances in Kaathal – The Core (2023) for which she won her fifth Filmfare Awards South in the category Best Actress – Malayalam

She made a comeback to Bollywood in 2024 with Shaitaan since her debut film Doli Saja Ke Rakhna (1998), with Ajay Devgn and R. Madhavan, which became the fifth highest-grossing Hindi film of 2024, followed by Srikanth (2024) and System (2026) won her critical acclaim and accolades for her powerful performances. She won her fifth Best Actress Award for portraying Chithra in Mani Ratnam's Chekka Chivantha Vaanam at Tamil Nadu State Film Awards and remains as the only Actress to win most Awards at Tamil Nadu State Film Awards.

== Early life ==
Jyothika was born on 18 October 1978 to a Punjabi Hindu father and a Maharashtrian Muslim mother. Her father is Chander Sadanah, a film producer and her mother is Seema Sadanah. Actress Nagma is her half-sister. She also has a sister Roshini (born Radhika) and a brother Suraj, who is working as an assistant director for Priyadarshan. She is the niece of produer Brij Sadanah and actress Sayeeda Khan, and the cousin of actor Kamal Sadanah.

Jyothika completed her schooling from the Learner's Academy, Mumbai. She later majored in Psychology at the Mithibai College in Mumbai.

== Career ==
=== Debut and early career (1998–2002) ===
She made her acting debut in the Hindi film Doli Saja Ke Rakhna, directed by Priyadarshan, but it did not do well commercially. For her fresh debut she was nominated for Best Female Debut at 44th Filmfare Awards, which was lost to Preity Zinta for Dil Se.. and Soldier. She was also nominated for Zee Cine Award for Best Female Debut.

Her first role in Tamil was in Vaalee (1999), for which she won Filmfare Award for Best Female Debut – South, Cinema Express Award for Best Newface - Female and Dinakaran Award for the Best Female Debut. Later that year, she starred in Poovellam Kettuppar, in which she played the love interest of the protagonist, portrayed by her future husband Suriya. Later, she starred with Ajith Kumar in Mugavaree (2000).

The success of the film Kushi (2000) became a turning point in her career. She was awarded the Filmfare Best Tamil Actress Award, Dinakaran Film Award for Best Actress & Cinema Express Award for Best Sensational Actress at the Cinema Express Awards, for her performance as Jennifer in Kushi. Her role in Rhythm though small, has been widely appreciated. She also acted with Kamal Haasan during this period, in the comedy film Thenali. After the success of Kushi, she was signed to play the female lead in Friends, opposite Vijay, but she was replaced by Devayani. Later, she appeared in the Tamil thriller film Snegithiye, directed by Priyadarshan, made in Tamil and Malayalam. She collaborated with Mani Ratnam for the first time by appearing in his production house Madras Talkies' romantic comedy Dumm Dumm Dumm, alongside Madhavan. The film won positive acclaim and became a success not only in Tamil Nadu, but also in Andhra with its dubbed version.

She starred opposite to Ajith Kumar in Poovellam Un Vaasam (2001) which became a commercial hit as well as her character received huge response and accolades. She won the Cinema Express Award for Best Actress – Tamil, which was given by her co-star Ajith Kumar at the Cinema Express Awards. Ajith was nominated for the Filmfare Award for Best Actor – Tamil, and Jyothika for Best Actress – Tamil. The success of the film prompted Ezhil, Ajith and Jyothika to team up for a venture the following year with Raja (2002).

She had a dual role in Nagarahavu (2002). For her work in the Kannada film, she won the Udaya Film Award for Best Actress along with Upendra for her Best Male Actor Award.she was also nominated Filmfare Award for Best Actress – Kannada in that year.

=== Success and established actress in Tamil cinema (2003–2009) ===
In 2003, she starred in Dhool with Vikram, Kaakha Kaakha with Suriya, Thirumalai with Vijay, all of which did well at the box office, Kaakha Kaakha, in particular, being one of the biggest hits of her career. She was listed among the Best Actress nominees in Filmfare Awards South for her roles in Dhool and Kaakha Kaakha. She got International Tamil Film Awards Special Jury For Best Actress. Dhool, Kaakha Kaakha and Thirumalai were among the top 10 films of the year and The Hindu wrote that she was "virtually the undisputed queen of Kollywood". Actor Vikram referred to her as Lady Kamal Haasan due to her dedication in acting. In 2004, she acted in a double role in the critically acclaimed Perazhagan, opposite Suriya. She won Tamil Nadu State Best Actress Award for the film. In 2004, she acted in Manmadhan, opposite Silambarasan. She also performed the lead female role in the Telugu film Tagore, opposite Chiranjeevi, which was screened at the International Indian Film Academy Awards, and was a commercial success.

Her most successful film in Tamil was Chandramukhi (2005), in which she played the title role. She acted along with Rajinikanth for the first time. She won accolades for her performance in Chandramukhi including a Tamil Nadu State Film Awards and Filmfare Awards Nomination. She was also offered a chance to act with Mohanlal in Udayon, directed by Bhadran, but she could not do it due to busy schedules in Tamil. Her first release in 2006 was Saravana, opposite Silambarasan after Manmadhan. Her role in June R was noticed before the release of the film. Her films in 2006 include Vettaiyaadu Vilaiyaadu, a crime thriller film written and directed by Gautham Vasudev Menon and Sillunu Oru Kaadhal, opposite Suriya.

Her last films were Gautham Vasudev Menon's Pachaikili Muthucharam and the critically acclaimed Mozhi, both in 2007. Her roles in these two films, as a negative character in the former (which she played for the first time) and as a deaf and mute in the latter earned her widespread appreciation. Among these, Mozhi won her acclaim. Her performance took her very close to winning the National Film Award for Best Actress. However, she lost the award by a narrow margin at the end. In Pachaikili Muthucharam she had a crucial role and pulled off a memorable performance. Jyothika later made a comeback through television adverts. The film was written and produced by her father-in-law Sivakumar and also starred Vijay, R. Madhavan and Suriya. Her Malayalam films Raakilipattu (2007) and Seetha Kalyanam (2009).

=== Film comeback and further work (2015–2017) ===
Jyothika made her comeback to Tamil Cinema with 36 Vayadhinile, a remake of the hit Malayalam film How Old Are You?. Jyothika received critical acclaim for her performance in the film as a middle-aged housewife who sets out to stand on her own. She was awarded the Tamil Nadu State Film Award for Best Actress and Filmfare Critics Award for Best Actress – Tamil. She also received Behindwoods Gold Medals For best Actress and Best Movie Award along with Suriya and also got many nominations for best actress. The film went on to become a commercial success at the box office. In the audio release of 36 Vayadhinile, and also at the successful release of the film Jyothika she credited Suriya, her husband, and some of her close friends as the major motivation for her comeback. By her fourth Best Actress Award at Tamil Nadu State Film Awards, she became the actress with the most Best Actress Awards. Later in February 2016, director Bramma approached Jyothika to play the leading role in a "female-centric" script he had written and impressed by the offer, her husband Suriya agreed to finance the film. Jyothika subsequently participated in a series of workshops to get ready for her role in the film for twenty days. The movie is titled Magalir Mattum, written and directed by Bramma, in his second venture after Kuttram Kadithal (2015). It also features Saranya, Urvashi, Bhanupriya, Nassar and J. Livingston playing pivotal roles. Produced by Suriya, the venture began production in July 2016. She was also signed by Sri Thenandal Films for another project titled Mersal together in September 2016, opposite Vijay, directed by Atlee. A few days after the shoot began, Jyothika opted out of the project and the makers signed Nithya Menen to replace her. No official announcement is made so far about the replacement.

In late February 2017, Suriya confirmed Jyothika's new project, Naachiyaar by sharing the first look posters of the film. She received several accolades for her performance in Naachiyar as Rough and Riveting Cop. Deccan chronicle addressed her as "Lady Singham". As per behindwoods Jyothika is fantastic, as she masterfully plays the role of a menacing, short-tempered and a bold cop, with a gracious heart. Following the immense success of the film and Jyothika's big fan following in the Telugu speaking states, the film Naachiyar has been dubbed into Telugu by the title Jhansi. Jyothika agreed to portray a leading female role in Mani Ratnam's project titled Chekka Chivantha Vaanam in early September 2017, and confirmed her participation to the media while promoting Magalir Mattum (2017). She had earlier appeared in Mani Ratnam's production venture Dumm Dumm Dumm (2001), but stated her excitement at being selected in a film to be directed by him.

=== Further success (2018–2023) ===
In 2018, she appeared as the lead role of Chitra, a housewife to Arvind Swami's character in Mani Ratnam's film Chekka Chivantha Vaanam. The first look was released on 21 August. The film has a worldwide release on 27 September 2018. She was next seen as a housewife struggling to find her own identity in Kaatrin Mozhi, the Tamil remake of Vidya Balan's Tumhari Sulu. The project, which officially went on the floors on 4 June, was directed by Radha Mohan and marked his reunion with Jyothika after the critically acclaimed Mozhi.

After the success of Kaatrin Mozhi, she was again cast as one of the female lead roles in Mani Ratnam's period action drama film, Ponniyin Selvan: I. She was also considered for the lead female role in Vetrimaaran's Asuran opposite Dhanush. She opted out from both films due to her prior project commitments. Jyothika was seen in three films that year, Raatchasi, produced by Dream Warrior Pictures in which she plays a school teacher; Jackpot, in which she appears as a cop co-starring Revathi under 2D Entertainment and Thambi, a Jeethu Joseph film along with Karthi. She won several accolades for her performance in Raatchasi including Behindwoods Gold Medal Award for Best Actor Lead Role (Female), and the Edison Award for Best Actress.

After the success of three films, she starred in a legal drama film written and directed by J. J. Fredrick in his directorial debut, Ponmagal Vandhal. Being Amazon's first Indian digital film and the maiden Tamil film to be released on a streaming platform following pandemic restrictions, the film was premiered digitally on 29 May 2020 and received mixed reviews from critics, praising Jyothika's performance, story and the social message conveyed in the film, but criticised the lack of depth in the narration, slow-paced and clichéd screenplay. However, it became one of the most watched films in digital streaming services of the year. Her 50th film, Udanpirappe was released directly on Amazon Prime Video on 14 October 2021 as a part of 2D Entertainment's four-film deal with the streaming service. She was Nominated for Best actress Category for her performances in both films, Ponmagal Vandhal and Udanpirappe as Venba / Angel / Sakthijothi (imagination) and Maathangi Sargunam respectively at 67th Filmfare Awards South. Gargi, starring Sai Pallavi was distributed by Jyothika and Suriya.

Jyothika's first Telugu entry as the lead female role was in the Telugu film Tagore, opposite Chiranjeevi, in which she played his wife. The film was screened at the International Indian Film Academy Awards, and was a commercial success. She acted along with Nagarjuna in Mass, directed by debutant Raghava Lawrence, for which she was nominated for her first Filmfare Award for Best Actress – Telugu Nomination at Filmfare Awards.

Her last film in Telugu was Shock, opposite to Ravi Teja. It was produced by Ram Gopal Varma. She was considered to act in the Telugu film Stalin, opposite Chiranjeevi. She was selected as the lead actress opposite Nagarjuna in Sri Ramadasu and Venkatesh in Lakshmi, but refused the offers due to her marriage preparations. She was asked to act along with Venkatesh again in Aadavari Matalaku Arthale Verule. Her film Mozhi was released in Telugu under the title Maataranai Mounamidi.

After an impressive comeback, she was approached by director Venu Sriram and producer Dil Raju for a strong character in the film Middle Class Abbayi starring Nani, Sai Pallavi and Bhumika Chawla. Chawla replaced her later. Her latest film Thambi along with Karthi was dubbed into Telugu as Donga.

She acted in three Malayalam films: Raakilipattu (2007), Seetha Kalyanam (2009) and Kaathal – The Core (2023). For her work in Seetha Kalyanam (2009), she was nominated for Best Actress – Malayalam at Filmfare Awards but lost to Swetha Menon for Paleri Manikyam.

In Kaathal – The Core, she played Omana, the wife of Mathew played by Mammootty. Her performance gained widespread critical acclaim from critics as well as from audiences. She was awarded Filmfare Critics Award for Best Actress – Malayalam & was Nominated for Best Actress Category at the same Event, also she won Vanitha Film Awards for Best Actress at Vanitha Film Awards-2024 and was nominated for best actress categories at Koimoi Awards and National Critics Choice Awards, along with Mammootty for best actor category.

=== Successful return to Hindi cinema (2024–present) ===
She returned to Hindi film industry after 24 years after her debut movie Doli Saja Ke Rakhna, with Shaitaan (2024), a supernatural horror film directed by Vikas Bahl co - starring Ajay Devgn, R. Madhavan, Janki Bodiwala and Anngad Raaj. It was theatrically released on 8 March 2024, coinciding with Maha Shivaratri. It received mostly positive reviews from critics with praise directed towards the performances and screenplay. It was a commercial success, grossing over ₹200 crore (US$21 million) worldwide and became the fourth highest grossing Indian film of 2024. She played a mentor in Srikanth (2024) co-starring Rajkummar Rao and Alaya F. she also played a major role in Netflix's series Dabba Cartel with Shabana Azmi.

== Personal life ==
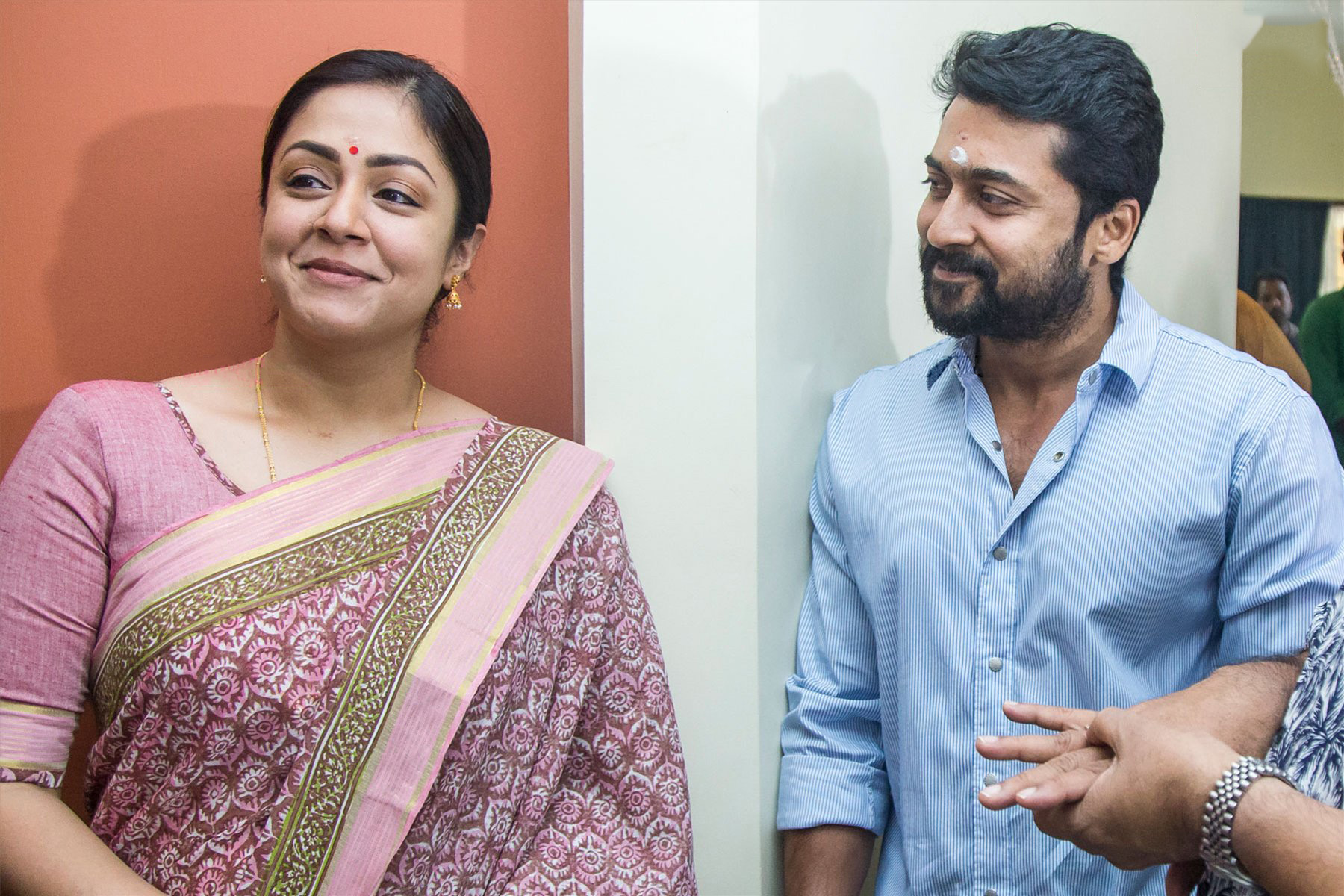
Jyothika and Suriya at the launch of the former's film Kaatrin Mozhi (2018)

Jyothika married actor Suriya on 11 September 2006 in Chennai. The couple met on the sets of their first film together Poovellam Kettuppar (1999), and eventually began dating. They have two children: a daughter (Diya; born 2007) and a son (Dev; born 2010).

== Other ventures ==
Jyothika owns a film production and distribution company named 2D Entertainment, established by her husband and actor Suriya. Rajsekar Pandian is also a part of 2D. The company was named by the starting letter of Suriya's children Diya and Dev. The company was established in 2013.

The production house won Best Cinematography at 64th National Film Awards for DOP Tirru for 24 (2016) and Best Production Design at 64th National Film Awards for Subrata Chakraborthy, Shreyas Khedekar, and Amit Ray for 24 (2016).

At 68th National Film Awards the film Soorarai Pottru won 5 Categories: Best Actor for Suriya, National Film Award for Best Actress for Aparna Balamurali, Best Feature Film for Suriya, Sudha Kongara, Jyothika, Best Music Direction (Background Score) for GV Prakash Kumar and Best Screenplay for Sudha Kongara.

== Off-screen work ==
=== Philanthropy ===
Jyothika and her husband Suriya's Agaram Foundation donated ₹25 lakh to the Thanjavur government hospital in August 2020. Apart from the financial support she also donated medical equipment and beds. This comes after she was criticised for her comments on the poor maintenance of the hospital before. Jyothika also starred in a short commercial video outlining child poverty, labour and lack of education, titled Herova? Zerova?. It was created by Agaram Foundation with the Ministry of Education in Tamil Nadu.

In 2021, Jyothika and Suriya's production house donated ₹1 crore to the welfare of Tamil Nadu tribal community.

In 2024, Jyothika and her husband donated Rs 50 lakh to the CM Relief Fund to provide relief to the Wayanad district of Kerala which was devastated by landslides.

=== Brand endorsements ===
Jyotika has been announced as the Zee Tamil channel's first brand ambassador, who features in the channel's extensive multi-media campaign as its voice. The unveil and launch happened on the stage of Sa Re Ga Ma Pa Seniors with the entire family of stars from Zee Tamil in a ceremony celebrating the channels new look and feel and brand proposition.

Jyothika, along with actor Vivek, had been appointed as ambassadors for plastic free Tamil Nadu campaign by the State government under the leadership of former Chief Minister Edappadi K. Palaniswami.

== In the media ==
Times of India ranked Jyothika among the best actresses of South India. The Hindu referred to her as one of the Superstar women in Indian cinema and noted that she has "proved her mettle and has the box office pull". Outlook India named her as one of the actress who has uplifted "women-centric films" in South India.

Vikram Venkateswaran of The Quint termed her the "standalone female lead actor" who can carry a film "entirely on her shoulders". Karthik Kumar of Hindustan Times termed her the "comeback queen" and added, "Jyothika brought in the wave of women-centric cinema to Tamil industry which gained momentum post the release of 36 Vayadhinile." Her portrayal in Mozhi, Pachaikili Muthucharam and 36 Vayadhinile are considered among the most memorable female characters of Tamil cinema.

== Accolades ==
Jyothika has won a total of eleven Tamil Nadu State Film Awards, a record of five Best Actress Award for Perazhagan, Chandramukhi, Mozhi, 36 Vayadhinile and Chekka Chivantha Vaanam. She also won Best Film co-producer Award along with Suriya through their production house 2D Entertainment six times.She has won five Filmfare Awards South among twenty four nominations - Best Debut for Vaalee, Best Actress for Kushi, Critics Best Actress – Tamil for 36 Vayathinile, Best Film for Jai Bhim and Critics Best Actress – Malayalam for Kaathal – The Core. For Soorarai Pottru, she won the National Film Award for Best Feature Film.
