= Herova? Zerova? =

- Directed by: V. Priya
- Written by: Sivakumar
- Produced by: Suriya; I. Vishnuvardhan
- Starring: Vijay; R. Madhavan; Jyothika; Suriya
- Cinematography: K. V. Anand
- Edited by: Sreekar Prasad
- Music by: Harris Jayaraj
- Release date: 11 September 2008
- Running time: 5 minutes
- Country: India
- Language: Tamil

Herova? Zerova? (transl. Hero or Zero?) is a 2008 Indian Tamil-language short docudrama produced by Suriya. Sponsored by the Ministry of Education of Tamil Nadu, the 5-minute film was directed by V. Priya with cinematography by K. V. Anand and music by Harris Jayaraj. It was featured on Kalaignar TV and officially uploaded to YouTube, but was later removed.

The film highlighted the importance of childhood education and sought to create awareness of early dropouts and child labour in Tamil Nadu. In the intro of the film, then-chief minister M. Karunanidhi recites his own poem on education. Along with Suriya, actors R. Madhavan, Jyothika and Vijay (in order of appearance) feature as themselves.

== Cast ==
- Vijay as himself
- R. Madhavan as himself
- Jyothika as herself
- Suriya as himself
- M Karunanidhi as himself in voice role
