= Mozhi (film) =

2007 film by Radha Mohan

- Poster
- Directed by: Radha Mohan
- Written by: Viji (dialogue)
- Screenplay by: Radha Mohan
- Story by: Radha Mohan
- Produced by: Prakash Raj
- Starring: Prithviraj; Jyothika; Prakash Raj; Swarnamalya
- Cinematography: K. V. Guhan
- Edited by: Kasi Viswanathan
- Music by: Vidyasagar
- Production company: Duet Movies
- Distributed by: Oscar Films
- Release date: 23 February 2007
- Running time: 155 minutes
- Country: India
- Language: Tamil

Mozhi (transl. Language) is a 2007 Indian Tamil language musical romantic comedy film written and directed by Radha Mohan and produced by Prakash Raj. The film stars Prithviraj, Jyothika, Prakash Raj, and Swarnamalya. The film's plot is about Karthik (Prithviraj), who falls in love with a deaf and mute girl, Archana (Jyothika), but she considers him her friend and disapproves of his love. The rest of the story revolves around Archana accepting Karthik's love.

The film was launched in 2006 and shot at several locations in India and Mauritius. Vidyasagar scored the music while the lyrics were written by Vairamuthu. Mu. Kasivishwanathan handled the editing and K. V. Guhan worked as the cinematographer. The dialogues were written by Viji. The film was released on 23 February 2007 and emerged as a critical and commercial success.

Jyothika won Best Actress at Tamil Nadu State Film Awards. Reportedly, she also reached the final round of National Film Award for Best Actress for her role, however she lost the award to Umashree for the Kannada film Gulabi Talkies, by one vote. The film was dubbed in Telugu as Maatarani Mounamidi in 2012 and released to positive reviews.

Mozhi was the first Tamil film receiving the fastest launch in the home video market. The producers tied up with optical disc maker Moser Baer for the release. The film was premiered in the Non prize section of 2007 Cannes Film Festival.

== Plot ==
Karthik and Vijayakumar alias Viji are best friends who are keyboard players in music composer Vidyasagar's team. They are brilliant in their work of rerecording and background scores. They are fun-loving, witty, and they share a great rapport. They come to live in an apartment complex building where they meet a handful of interesting people. Their irritable flat secretary, Ananthakrishnan (Brahmanandam), is not too happy about Karthik and Viji occupying the flat and asks them to vacate as bachelors are not allowed to live there.

One day, Karthik sees a girl on the road and is quite impressed by her personality and attitude. Later, he finds out that the girl is Archana (Jyothika), a deaf and mute girl who lives in the same apartment with her grandmother. Karthik falls in love with her, and along with Viji, tries to find out more about her from her best friend and colleague Sheela (Swarnamalya). Initially, Sheela is sceptical of Karthik's intentions. However, on further conversation, Karthik and Viji manage to make a positive impression, and Sheela decides to talk to them about Archana. She tells them that Archana's father abandoned his family after he found out about Archana's disability. This incident motivated Archana to be independent and work towards nurturing her talents, but also caused her to develop a distrust towards men and marital life.

Karthik begins learning sign language from Sheela so that he can communicate with Archana. Karthik and Archana begin taking jogs and spending time together. Karthik, Viji, Sheela and Archana hang out together, and over time, develop a genuine friendship. Eventually, Karthik confesses his love and proposes to Archana, who gets angry and upset. Karthik tries to ask her for a chance at a relationship. However, his pleas are to no avail. Archana replies angrily and asks him to never see her again. Archana begins avoiding Karthik. Although heartbroken, Karthik respects her decision.

A parallel plot involves Professor Gnanaprakasam (M. S. Bhaskar), who is unable to accept the reality of his son Babu's death. Unable to accept the loss, he copes by believing that he lives in the year 1984, the year his son died. Karthik helps him let out his feelings and cry, after which he accepts the grief of losing his son. Preethi (Neelima Rani), a girl from one of those apartments, is infatuated with Karthik. Through a series of mishaps, Ananthakrishnan wrongly comes to believe that Preethi is in love with him. This leads to some funny consequences. Ananthakrishnan finally learns to accept Karthik and Viji's stay in the apartment after Karthik helps Gnanaprakasam.

At the same time, Viji also falls in love with Sheela, who is a widow. Sheela and her parents agree to the marriage, and their marriage date is fixed. Archana decides not to attend the wedding as Karthik would be present, which causes a rift between her and Sheela's friendship. While fighting with Sheela, Archana admits that her rejection of Karthik's proposal stems from her distrust and fear of Karthik leaving if their baby shares her disability. On learning of this, Karthik angrily confronts Archana and asks her to learn to believe in life and deal with her insecurities instead of hiding her true feelings like a coward. He asks her to believe him and tells her that he will accept and love her and their future children no matter what. He breaks into tears, and leaves. On the day of Viji and Sheela's wedding, Archana arrives. Archana and Sheela reconcile. Archana admits her feelings for Karthik and finally confesses to Karthik that she indeed loves him. The story ends with Viji and Sheela congratulating Karthik and Archana.

== Cast ==
- Prithviraj as Karthik
- Jyothika as Archana
- Prakash Raj as Vijayakumar "Viji"
- Swarnamalya as Angeline Sheela
- Brahmanandam as Ananthakrishnan
- M. S. Bhaskar as Professor Gnanaprakasam
- Balaji as Shanmugam
- Vatsala Rajagopal as Archana's grandmother
- Sriranjani as Jaanu (Ananthakrishnan wife)
- Neelima Rani as Preeti
- Sangeetha Balan as the abusive man's wife
- Geetha Ravishankar as Professor Gnanaprakasam's wife
- Muthukaalai as the abusive man
- Citizen Sivakumar as the priest during Viji and Sheela's wedding
- Master Saisujith as Ananthakrishnan's son

Ganesh Babu and Ramya Subramanian, uncredited, appear as Pichumani and Pannaiyar's daughter, respectively.

== Production ==
"As a boy, I had seen such a girl living in my colony. She looked cute and moved about cheerfully. I would wonder what 'sound' meant to her. So later I felt it would be interesting to have a musician opposite this role".

— Radha Mohan, in an interview with The Hindu in July 2007.

Director Radha Mohan revealed that idea of Mozhi came from a little girl who stayed in his neighbourhood. He also revealed that he had Jyothika in his mind while writing down her character, she initially refused to act but later agreed after hearing the script. Prithviraj was selected after director was impressed with his performance in Parijatham (2006). Prasanna was originally selected for the role which was eventually portrayed by Prakash Raj. Many actresses refused to play the character of Jyothika's friend, finally Swarnamalya was selected to play the role, Swarnamalya agreed after hearing the script which gave equal importance to women characters.

Elango Kumaravel who earlier appeared in the director's previous films did not act in this film; instead he worked as a dubbing artist lending his voice for Brahmanandam. M. S. Bhaskar played a professor who suffers from amnesia post an accident that caused him to lose his son. Radha Mohan taught him the gait he used in the film. Neelima Rani portrayed a supporting role. Ramya Subramanian made her film debut through this film. The film's climax was shot at the Church of Our Lady of Angels in Pondicherry.

== Music ==
Mozhi

Soundtrack album by Vidyasagar
- Released: 2 February 2007
- Recorded: 2007
- Studio: Varsha Vallaki Studios
- Genre: Soundtrack
- Length: 29:18
- Language: Tamil
- Label: Saregama
- Producer: Vidyasagar

Vidyasagar chronology
Kaiyoppu (2007)	Mozhi (2007)	Periyar (2007)

The soundtrack was composed by Vidyasagar. Vairamuthu penned the lyrics for all the songs. The song "Kannal Pesum" is a modification of the song "Elamankanniloode... I Am Thinking of You" ("Walking in the Moonlight") from the Malayalam film Satyam Sivam Sundaram (2000). All the songs were well received especially "Kaatrin Mozhi" and "Sevvanam".

A segment of Harry Belafonte's version of the popular Jewish folk song Hava Nagila is played during the comedy scene between Prakash Raj and Brahmanandam.

The audio was released on 2 February 2007 at Sathyam Cinemas in Chennai. The album received positive reviews from critics.

Track listing
No.	Title	Singer(s)	Length
1.	"Kannal Pesum Penne"	S. P. Balasubrahmanyam	4:43
2.	"Kaatrin Mozhi"	Balram	5:52
3.	"Sevvanam Selai Katti"	Jassie Gift	4:45
4.	"Mouname Unnidam"	Srinivas	1:16
5.	"En Jannal Therivadhu"	Karthik	0:56
6.	"Pesa Madandhayae"	Madhu Balakrishnan	4:44
7.	"Aazha Kannaal"	Tippu	1:09
8.	"Kaatrin Mozhi (Female)"	Sujatha	5:53
Total length:			29:18

== Release ==
The film was released on 23 February 2007. The film's official website was created by entertainment portal Indiaglitz. The film was dubbed in Telugu under the title Maataranai Mounamidi (2012).

=== Home media ===
Mozhi has been released in VCDs and DVDs by Moser Baer Home Video. The film had its television premiere on Kalaignar TV on 15 September 2007.

== Reception ==
=== Critical reception ===
Mozhi received critical acclaim. A critic from Sify wrote, "Director Radha Mohan has once again proved that he can make a pucca family entertainer with characters that you can relate to. Mozhi is indeed gutsy, feel-good, real solid movie within the framework of commercial cinema". A critic from Rediff.com wrote: "Mozhi is a groundbreaking movie for Tamil cinema in many ways. It does not over-sentimentalise physical handicaps [..] The story is no-nonsense and without any unnecessary frills. Strong characterisation and excellent performances from the cast make this truly a remarkable film". A critic from The Hindu wrote: "Mozhi is surely a film its producer can be proud of [..] Conceiving a simple yet poignant line, creating a screenplay that takes you along smoothly, and helming it, director Radha Mohan presents 'Mozhi' with panache".

Chennai Online wrote "With a neatly etched screenplay, some finely defined characters and a smooth flow of scenes, and humour strewn throughout, director Radha Mohan weaves an engaging tale that leaves you with a feeling of warmth and satisfaction. Vidyasagar's soft melodies, Kathir's aesthetically designed interiors, and Guhan's frames that give a rich glossy look, all enhance the film's entertainment value". Lajjavathi of Kalki praised the acting of Jyothika and Prithviraj and other actors, humour, dialogues, music and cinematography and noted a natural screenplay by Radha Mohan keeps the film moving without getting bored. He has combined all aspects of affection, love, anger and sadness to create a delicious feast and concluded saying Mozhi is not just a film that speaks but a film that everyone loves. Cinesouth wrote "For having made 'Mozhi' a film that one can watch with one's family and also learn a few valuable lessons, director Radha Mohan is to be lauded as one who has joined the rank of directors like Fazil".

=== Box-office ===
"The success of 'Mozhi' is very heartening [...] All of us knew what we were doing and it was an opportunity for us to say, "Hey, we're capable of this" and the audience have in turn said, "Guys, we love you." They won't forgive us if we do a clichéd movie now".

— Prakash Raj, in an interview with The Hindu in April 2007.

Released on 23 February 2007, Mozhi faced competition from Paruthiveeran, which was released on the same day. The film took a big opening at the Chennai box office, The film continued to rank at first at the Chennai box office for five successive weeks, being ousted only by the American film 300 during the Easter weekend. The film was produced on a budget of $500,000 and it became a surprise hit grossing $2 million and declared one of the most commercially successful Tamil films of the year. The positive response of the film has led to the generation of additional prints. The film completed a theatrical run of 100 days. The film's 100-day function was held in the open air club house attached to Mayajaal multiplex on the ECR. Anjali Arora, a visually challenged lawyer, working as a legal advisor to the Ministry of Civil Aviation, Balu Mahendra, Ameer, Lingusamy and Sundar.C attended the function.

== Legacy ==
Mozhi became an important film in the career of Prithviraj and Jyothika. The film proved that the people would accept stories based on disability if the film was presented in a new and innovative way. The film continued the trend of films with different themes that focused on realism. K. Jeshi of The Hindu placed the film in the category of films that propagate social issues along with other films like Sethu (1999), Kaadhal (2004), Veyil (2006), Imsai Arasan 23am Pulikesi (2006) and Paruthiveeran (2007).

Director Mahendran listed Mozhi as one of his favourite films. Documentary filmmaker Swarnavel says films such as Kaadhal, Veyil, Mozhi and Paruthi Veeran have pushed the envelope of mainstream Tamil cinema. Actress Revathi stated that: "young film makers in particular have come up with some wonderful, well-researched movies featuring disability, such as Mozhi, Black, Deiva Thirumagal, Beautiful, and many others. These films, with their accurate detailing and brilliant portrayals don't paint disability as a tragedy, but show it as a part of life". In an interview to Times of India in 2008, Keerthi Chawla revealed that: "I'm looking for a role on the lines of the one played by Jyotika in Mozhi and Sridevi in Moondram Pirai". P. B. Ramasamy, head of Big FM, Chennai told to Hindu that: "Mozhi was a wholesome entertainer and I never got bored even for a minute. The movie made me smile throughout and for the first time while watching a film, I felt the urge to watch it all over again". Dancer Shweta Prachande who portrayed deaf and dumb character in a short film called Notes of Silence said she was inspired by Jothika's performance from the film to portray the character.

Scenes from the film have been parodied in Tamizh Padam (2010). Shiva's love signals, Disha Pandey's introduction scene and her friend character has been based on the film. The song "Kaatrin Mozhi" inspired a film of the same name, which was also directed by Radha Mohan, and also stars Jyothika.

== Accolades ==
At the 55th National Film Awards, according to Sibi Malayil, one of the jury members of feature film, Jyothika was one of the frontrunners for National Film Award for Best Actress, along with Meera Jasmine for the Malayalam film Ore Kadal and Umashree for the Kannada film Gulabi Talkies. However, she lost to Umashree.

2007 Vijay Awards

- Won - Best Supporting Actor - Prakash Raj
- Won - Best Story, Screenplay Writer - Viji
- Nominated - Best Film - Prakash Raj
- Nominated - Best Actress - Jyothika

2007 Tamil Nadu State Film Awards

- Won - Best Second Feature Film - Prakash Raj
- Won - Best Actress - Jyothika
- Won - Best Music Director - Vidyasagar
- Won - Tamil Nadu State Film Award for Best Character Artiste (Male) - M. S. Baskar

55th Filmfare Awards South

- Won - Best Tamil Male Playback Singer - S. P. Balasubrahmanyam for "Kannal Pesum Penne"
- Nominated - Best Tamil Film - Prakash Raj
- Nominated - Best Tamil Director - Radha Mohan
- Nominated - Best Tamil Actress - Jyothika

== Dropped remake ==
Boney Kapoor acquired the Hindi remake rights of the film in 2008; however it failed to materialize.
