= Cinema Express Award for Best Actress – Tamil =

Indian film award

- Awarded for: Best Performance by an Actress in a Leading Role in Tamil films
- Country: India
- Presented by: Cinema Express Awards
- First award: Lakshmi, Samsaram Adhu Minsaram (1986)

The Cinema Express Best Film Award is given as a part of its annual Cinema Express Awards for Tamil (Kollywood) films.

== Winners ==
Year	Actress	Film	Ref.
2002	Simran	Kannathil Muthamittal	
2001	Jyothika	Poovellam Un Vasam	
2000	Meena; Jyothika	Rhythm; Kushi	
1999	Simran	Vaalee	
1998	Roja Selvamani	Unnidathil Ennai Koduthen	
1997	Meena	Bharathi Kannamma	
1996	Khushbu Sundar	Irattai Roja	
1994	Revathi	En Aasai Machan	
1993	Radhika Sarathkumar; Sukanya	Kizhakku Cheemayile; Walter Vetrivel	
1992	Revathi; Sukanya	Thevar Magan; Chinna Gounder	
1991	Khushbu Sundar; Gautami	Chinna Thambi; Nee Pathi Naan Pathi	
1990	Revathi	Kizhakku Vasal	
1988	Radhika Sarathkumar	Paasa Paravaigal; Poonthotta Kaavalkaaran	
1986	Lakshmi	Samsaram Adhu Minsaram	
