= Tagore (film) =

2003 Telugu film by V. V. Vinayak

- Theatrical poster
- Directed by: V. V. Vinayak
- Screenplay by: V. V. Vinayak
- Dialogues by: Paruchuri Brothers
- Story by: A. R. Murugadoss
- Based on: Ramanaa (2002)
- Produced by: B. Madhu
- Starring: Chiranjeevi; Shriya; Jyothika
- Cinematography: Chota K. Naidu
- Edited by: Gautham Raju
- Music by: Mani Sharma
- Production company: Leo Projects Private Limited
- Release date: 24 September 2003
- Running time: 176 minutes
- Country: India
- Language: Telugu

Tagore is a 2003 Indian Telugu-language vigilante action film directed by V. V. Vinayak. The film stars Chiranjeevi, Shriya, and Jyothika, with Prakash Raj and Sayaji Shinde in pivotal supporting roles. The film features music by Mani Sharma and cinematography by Chota K. Naidu. Tagore is a remake of the 2002 Tamil film Ramanaa, with significant changes made to suit Chiranjeevi's stardom and the local context.

Tagore had a wide release, rivaling Bollywood's major films of the time. Upon release, it received positive reviews, particularly for its narration, Chiranjeevi's performance, and its impactful crowd scenes. The film became a significant commercial success, breaking several box-office records, and went on to become the second highest-grossing Telugu film of its time, surpassed only by Indra (2002), another Chiranjeevi starrer. It collected a distributor's share of ₹28.45 crore and became the second Telugu film to surpass ₹50 crore at the box office. The song "Nenu Saitham," written by Suddala Ashok Teja, won the National Film Award for Best Lyrics.100 days in 192 centers.

== Plot ==
The story begins with the mysterious disappearance of 15 Mandal Revenue Officers (MROs), of whom 14 are later released, while one is found murdered. Beside the victim's body, the police uncover incriminating files and a tape, which reveal that the officers were targeted for being the most corrupt among his peers. The Anti-Corruption Force (ACF), a vigilante organization, claims responsibility, declaring its mission to eradicate corruption by exposing malpractices, abducting officials, and executing the most egregious offenders. Tagore lives a seemingly simple life, raising adopted children from diverse cultural backgrounds. While appearing as a mild-mannered professor by day, he secretly orchestrates the ACF's operations. The ACF expands its operations to other government departments, including the Public Works Department (PWD) and the police force. Their actions instill fear among bureaucrats and temporarily curb illegal activities. In one incident, Tagore exposes corruption at a hospital by orchestrating a sting operation. He presents evidence of fraudulent medical practices and gets the hospital sealed, leading to the dean's arrest. However, the dean, revealed to be Badrinarayana's son, commits suicide. Enraged, Badrinarayana investigates Tagore and is shocked to discover that Tagore, presumed dead, is alive.

Meanwhile, Suryam, a police constable and an IPS-qualified individual who failed to secure an officer-level post due to his inability to pay a bribe, takes up the case to earn a promotion. Leveraging his medical leave, Suryam investigates the case, hypothesizing that a non-corrupt official in each government office may have been responsible for passing insider information to the ACF. Tracing their connections, he discovers that the officials are alumni of National College and are led by their former professor, Tagore, who serves as the ACF's leader. However, Tagore's true identity remains unknown to Suryam. However, corruption resurfaces due to pressure from criminal elements. The ACF identifies Badrinarayana, a powerful businessman, as the root cause of systemic corruption and escalates its efforts against him. After Devaki learns about his identity, Tagore reveals everything about his transformation into a vigilante, which is rooted in a personal tragedy.

Past: On a Deepavali day, his apartment building collapses due to substandard construction linked to a highway project undertaken by Badrinarayana's company. The incident claims the lives of Tagore's wife, son, and uncle. Seeking justice, Tagore confronts government officials, only to face apathy. When he discovers that corruption enabled the disaster, Tagore forms the ACF to eliminate corrupt elements, including Badrinarayana.

Present: As Suryam closes in on the ACF, its members are captured and tortured by the police. To save his students, Tagore surrenders, after Badrinarayana escapes and kills several ACF members. Tagore's surrender garners widespread public support, prompting a meeting with the Chief Minister. Despite the opportunity for clemency, Tagore insists on accountability for his actions. In order to kill Tagore, Badrinarayana bribes the jailer, who in turn is revealed to be involved in Tagore's plan. Tagore finally eliminates Badrinarayana and his henchmen. In court, Tagore delivers a compelling speech on the devastating impact of corruption on the nation, particularly on its youth. He later confesses to killing Badrinarayana and his associates and accepts a five-year prison sentence. The film concludes with Tagore emphasizing the importance of eradicating corruption to safeguard the country's future.

== Cast ==
- Chiranjeevi as Ravindranath Tagore, professor of National College
- Shriya as Devaki
- Jyothika as Nandini aka Nandhu, Tagore's wife
- Prakash Raj as Constable Suryam
- Sayaji Shinde as Badrinarayana
- Puneet Issar as Police Commissioner Balbir Singh
- Sunil as Boost, a babysitter who always gets insulted by the kids fostered by Tagore
- K. Viswanath as Chief Minister
- Rama Prabha as Tagore's grandmother
- M. S. Narayana as Tagore's uncle
- Ahuti Prasad as Public Prosecutor Subba Rao
- Raja Ravindra as Badrinarayana's son
- Uttej as Auto Driver
- Sarika Ramachandra Rao as Suryam's colleague
- Narsing Yadav as Goon
- Kota Srinivasa Rao as Investigation Officer
- Venu Madhav as Clerk
- Dharmavarapu Subrahmanyam as Department Officer
- Jeeva as Investigation Officer
- Ramaraju as Investigation Officer Ramaraju
- Jenny
- Sameer Hasan
- Subbaraya Sharma
- C. V. L. Narasimha Rao as a patient's husband
- V. V. Vinayak as Gopi
- Raghu Karumanchi as Subbu
- FEFSI Vijayan as Jailor
- Ravichandran as Judge
- Pavala Syamala as Grandma from government hospital whose husband died
- Kalairani as an ACF member's mother
- Master Sajja Teja as Tagore's adopted son
- Baby Kavya as Tagore's adopted daughter

== Production ==
Tagore was directed by V. V. Vinayak and produced by B. Madhu under the banner of Leo Projects. Madhu, a Telugu-speaking engineer, had previously produced two Tamil films and worked as an associate producer for Oscar Films, where he was mentored by Oscar Ravi. After the success of Indra (2002), Chiranjeevi collaborated with Vinayak for Tagore, which is a remake of the 2002 Tamil film Ramanaa, written and directed by A. R. Murugadoss. Initially, actor Rajasekhar had expressed interest in starring in the Telugu remake but was unable to secure the rights.

To suit Chiranjeevi's image, Tagore was adapted with significant changes, including alterations to the climax and adding more songs for the protagonist. These modifications helped the film establish its own identity. The dialogue "Meeku mukhyamantriki vunnanta network vundi" (You have the network of a chief minister) was written by Paruchuri Venkateswara Rao. Chiranjeevi was initially hesitant to have it during the court scene. The filmmakers convinced him to keep it, agreeing to cut it if it didn't work well. After reviewing the footage, Chiranjeevi still wanted to remove it, but the filmmakers insisted on keeping it. The dialogue was praised in the final version of the film. Additionally, a dialogue stating "Meeru devudu" (You are a god) appeared three times in the film, but Chiranjeevi requested its removal, feeling that it crossed the line of character portrayal and veered too much into personal adulation.

The climax was filmed at Sri Venkateswara University in Tirupati, where a large crowd of Chiranjeevi's fans gathered. This led to a confrontation with the police, resulting in a baton charge and injuries to two fans. Director Vinayak intervened to restore order during the incident.

== Music ==
Tagore

Soundtrack album to Tagore by Mani Sharma
- Released: 27 August 2003
- Recorded: 2003
- Genre: Feature film soundtrack
- Language: Telugu
- Label: Aditya Music
- Producer: Mani Sharma

Mani Sharma chronology
Palnati Brahmanayudu (2003)	Tagore (2003)	Abhimanyu (2003)

Tagore features music composed by Mani Sharma. The song "Nenu Saitham," written by Suddala Ashok Teja, won the National Film Award for Best Lyrics.

Track listing
No.	Title	Lyrics	Artist(s)	Length
1.	"Koditey Kottali"	Chandra Bose	Shankar Mahadevan	5:13
2.	"Nenu Saitham"	Suddala Ashok Teja	S. P. Balasubrahmanyam	4:05
3.	"Manmadha Manmadha"	Veturi	Mallikarjun, Mahalakshmi Iyer	5:01
4.	"Vaanochchenante"	Bhuvana Chandra	Udit Narayan, Shreya Ghoshal	5:08
5.	"Chinnaga Chinnaga"	Chandra Bose	K. S. Chithra, Hariharan	5:21
6.	"Gappu Chippu"	Suddala Ashok Teja	K. S. Chithra, Mano	4:09

== Release ==
Following the success of Indra (2002) and Chiranjeevi's unprecedented stardom, Tagore had a massive release, rivaling Bollywood's big-ticket films of the time. Three prominent producers of Telugu cinema, Allu Aravind, Aswini Dutt, and N. V. Prasad, served as distributors for the film, covering the Nizam, Krishna, and Ceded regions, respectively. Director V. V. Vinayak distributed the film in the East Godavari area.

The film's release generated immense fan excitement, leading to incidents such as stampedes and clashes between rival fan groups. Some theatres also reported black marketing of tickets and violent disputes over ticket distribution. The film was also released internationally, in countries including the USA, UK, Singapore, Dubai, and Kuwait. During the premiere in Singapore, crowd-related issues required police intervention.

Tragically, three fans lost their lives in stampedes at theatres in Rajahmundry and Mangalagiri during the film's release. In response, Chiranjeevi expressed his condolences and announced a compensation of ₹2 lakh for each deceased fan. His wife, Surekha, and son, Ram Charan, visited Rajahmundry to personally deliver the compensation to the victims' families, with additional financial support provided by other associates.

Some Chiranjeevi fans formed an organization called ACF (All Chiranjeevi Fans) and raided video shops in areas such as Dilshuknagar, Kukatpally, and Nandyal in October 2003, in search of pirated copies of the film.

== Reception ==
=== Box office ===
Tagore broke numerous opening records, becoming a record earner in regions such as Nizam, Uttarandhra, and overseas. It achieved the second-highest worldwide distributor's share of ₹28.45 crore for any Telugu film at the time, following Indra. It grossed over approximately ₹50 crore at the box office, becoming the second Telugu film to do so after Indra and the second South Indian film to do so in a single language. It emerged as the third highest grossing South Indian film, behind Indra and Padayappa. It also recorded the second-highest share for an Indian film in 2003, behind Koi... Mil Gaya, and the third-highest share globally.

The film set impressive records for its theatrical run, completing 50 days in 253 centers and 100 days in 192 centers. These records remained unbeaten until Pokiri surpassed them in 2006.

=== Critical reception ===
Sify rated the film three-and-a-half out of five and wrote, "Though the story line is thin, the narration is fast paced and the film is technically excellent". Jeevi of Idlebrain.com rated the film 3 3/4 out of 5 and appreciated the performances, stating, "Chiranjeevi is at his best, be it in histrionics or looks." On screenplay, he added, "Vinayak made sure that the screenplay is gripping enough to tell a simple story in a powerful way". Gudipoodi Srihari of The Hindu wrote, "The film is worth watching especially for the way the crowd scenes are shot".

== Awards and nominations ==
Year	Award category	Recipient	Result
2003	National Film Award for Best Lyrics	Suddala Ashok Teja	Won
2003	Santosham Best Actor Award	Chiranjeevi	Won
2003	Filmfare Award for Best Supporting Actor - Telugu	Prakash Raj	Won
