= Rhythm (2000 film) =

- DVD cover
- Directed by: Vasanth
- Written by: Vasanth
- Produced by: Pyramid Natarajan
- Starring: Arjun; Meena
- Cinematography: P. S. Vinod; Additional cinematography: Arthur A. Wilson; R. D. Rajasekhar
- Edited by: A. Sreekar Prasad
- Music by: A. R. Rahman
- Production company: Pyramid Films International
- Release date: 15 September 2000
- Running time: 143 minutes
- Country: India
- Language: Tamil

Rhythm is a 2000 Indian Tamil-language romantic drama film written and directed by Vasanth and produced by V. Natarajan. The film stars Arjun and Meena in the lead roles with Jyothika, Ramesh Aravind, Lakshmi, Nagesh, and Manivannan in important roles. The music was composed by A. R. Rahman, while cinematography was predominantly handled by P. S. Vinod, and Sreekar Prasad edited the film. Rhythm released on 15 September 2000 and became a commercial success. It was also dubbed and released in Telugu under the same title.

== Plot ==
Karthikeyan is a photographer-editor working for The Indian Express in Mumbai, and Chitra is a bank employee. Both reside in Navi Mumbai. Karthik meets Chitra while opening a bank account, and while returning home, he again meets her on the train. He offers his seat as she is standing, but she does not want to accept it. During a train strike, he invites her to travel in an auto rickshaw together to reduce expenses, but she declines. When Chitra hesitates the next day to travel in the same train with Karthik, he becomes exasperated and explains that he only talked to her because both are from the same locality and both are Tamilians, and he promises her that he will never talk to her again. After some days Chitra voluntarily talks to him, and Karthik sees that her handbag was snatched. In return, he accompanies her to the closest police station to report it. Karthik invites Chitra to his home to meet his parents.

Karthik's parents like Chitra a lot, and weeks later, Karthik's mother requests Chitra to tell Karthik to get married. When she conveys his parents' wish, Karthik tells her about his late wife Aruna. Five years earlier, Karthik was a police officer in Chennai, part of the bomb defusing squad. Though Aruna does not want Karthik to endanger his life as part of the job, she does not tell him to quit as she knows how much he loves his work. While Karthik and Aruna are in Tirupur to attend Aruna's friend's wedding, Karthik is pulled back to Coimbatore to defuse a bomb, which is accomplished successfully, but Karthik's colleague and friend Ajay ends up losing a leg on another assignment. Karthik goes to Chennai to meet Ajay, who tells him about Aruna's fears, and Karthik quits his job immediately. When he lets Aruna know, she decides to rush back home to meet Karthik, and leaves for Chennai by train. Due to a signalling error, her train collides head on with another train and she passes away. Karthik quit the police force entirely and moves to Mumbai.

Chitra tells Karthik about her life: she was a graduate in Chennai living with her brother's family and looking for a job. She meets SBI officer Srikanth through various accidental events, and they fall in love. While Chitra's family does not object to the marriage, Srikanth's Brahmin parents in Ooty are vehemently against it, but Srikanth disobeys them and they elope. Within hours, Srikanth receives news that his mother is extremely sick, when he goes to Ooty, he finds that his dad lied to him, and his mother banishes him forever. Distraught, he leaves to Chennai by train, and dies in the same train accident as Aruna. As per her husband's earlier wish, Chitra adopts Shiva, a baby boy from the orphanage that Srikanth regularly volunteered at. Chitra's brother gets a job offer in Singapore, and she convinces the family to take it. She is offered Srikanth's position at the bank. Knowing all this, Karthik's parents want them to marry each other.

Shiva gets close to Karthik and his family, while Chitra tries to prevent relations with Karthik. Karthik's father understands Karthik's interest towards Chitra. He asks her to marry Karthik. She refuses, and once for all, avoids Karthik. Karthik understands her intention and stayed away from her. Chitra meanwhile gets confused regarding a second marriage due to the trouble given by her neighbour's husband and Shiva's passion for Karthik. Chitra's neighbour once attempts to assault her; she manages to escape. Karthik, who heard about it, attacks the man for misbehaving, and makes him vacate Mumbai.

After much thought, Chitra decides to marry Karthik for herself and her son. She plans to meet him at the station to express her decision. While returning home, she meets her mother-in-law waiting for her. Chitra's mother-in-law requests her to come and live with her as she is very alone after her husband's death. Chitra applies for transfer and leaves to Ooty with her mother-in-law. She has not dared to meet Karthik and she leaves without informing him. Karthik and his family are very much disappointed by this.

After some months, Chitra panics on seeing a news about a bomb blast at Mumbai Indian Express and verifies Karthik's safety. Karthik leaves for Coonoor on an official assignment. There he meets Chitra with her mother-in-law in a shopping centre. Chitra introduces him to her and tells about Aruna's death in the same train accident where Srikanth died. On hearing this, Chitra's mother-in-law invites Karthik to have lunch with them the next day. This delights Shiva. He eagerly waits for Karthik and leaves school well before, but is stuck in a traffic jam for a long time. Meanwhile, Chitra explains about her decision to marry him, and later changed it as her mother-in-law requested her to live with him.

Karthik leaves without meeting Shiva to catch the train. This disappoints Shiva. When Chitra tried to console him, he blames her because she did not keep the promise that he, Chitra, Karthik, and his parents to live together. Chitra's mother-in-law hears this, understood the meaning of it and she realised the mistake she made. She catches Karthik at the station and requests him to marry Chitra. Karthik and Chitra leave for Mumbai and get married, delighting Shiva and Karthik's parents.

== Cast ==
- Arjun as Karthikeyan
- Meena as Chitra
- Jyothika as Aruna, Karthikeyan's late wife
- Ramesh Arvind as Srikanth, Chitra's late husband
- Lakshmi as Chitra's mother-in-law
- Mohan Raman as Chitra's father-in-law
- Nagesh as Karthik's father
- Vatsala Rajagopal as Karthik's mother
- Manivannan as Karthik's colleague
- Hemanth Ravan as Chitra's Neighbour
- Vaiyapuri as an umbrella salesman
- Ajay Rathnam as Ajay
- Aditya Madhavan as Shiva, Chitra's adopted child
- Kumar Natarajan as Auto driver in Mumbai

Special appearances

- Raju Sundaram in "Aiyoo Pathikichu" song
- Ramya Krishnan in "Aiyoo Pathikichu" song
- Nanditha Jennifer in "Aiyoo Pathikichu" song
- Shankar Mahadevan in "Thaniye" song
- Nagendra Prasad in "Thaniye" song
- Shobi in "Thaniye" song
- Shanthi in "Thaniye" Song
- Dinesh in "Thaniye" song
- Sridhar in "Thaniye" song
- Anant Mahadevan as the temple priest in Mumbai

== Production ==
=== Development ===
A man who lost his wife in a train crash reached out to a woman who lost her husband in the same accident, asking if she was interested in him. This happened in the eighties. I was intrigued by this idea, and the question was, how would you unite two characters who don't want that? I needed all the supporting characters and finally, got the screenplay.

— Vasanth

Originally announced with pre-release stills in websites in 1997, the film was four years in the making. Producer Pyramid Natarajan signed Vasanth for the project while he was working on Aasai (1995). P. S. Vinod was selected to make his debut as cinematographer instead of V. Manikandan, while the team also credited Arthur A. Wilson as an additional cinematographer and R. D. Rajasekhar was also given special thanks in the title card. Early reports suggested the film would be inspired by the 1995 American film, A Walk in the Clouds, but this proved untrue. It was also rumoured that the film would run along the lines of the 1998 film Pooveli, and this had also caused a delay in the making. During the initial stages of shoot, Vasanth considered renaming the film to Poo Pookkum Osai, but later kept the original title. A. R. Rahman, who was supposed to work in Aasai, worked as the composer.

=== Casting ===
Vasanth hired Arjun as the lead actor at the producer's suggestion. Though Arjun was then known as an action hero, Vasanth felt he could cast him against type. Meena, who was supposed to star in Vasanth's Nee Pathi Naan Pathi was cast as the heroine for this film. For a further lead role of Arjun's wife, Vasanth considered Vindhya, before finalising Jyothika, who was signed on to make her Tamil debut with the film, although Vaalee (1999) ended up releasing before Rhythm.

=== Filming ===
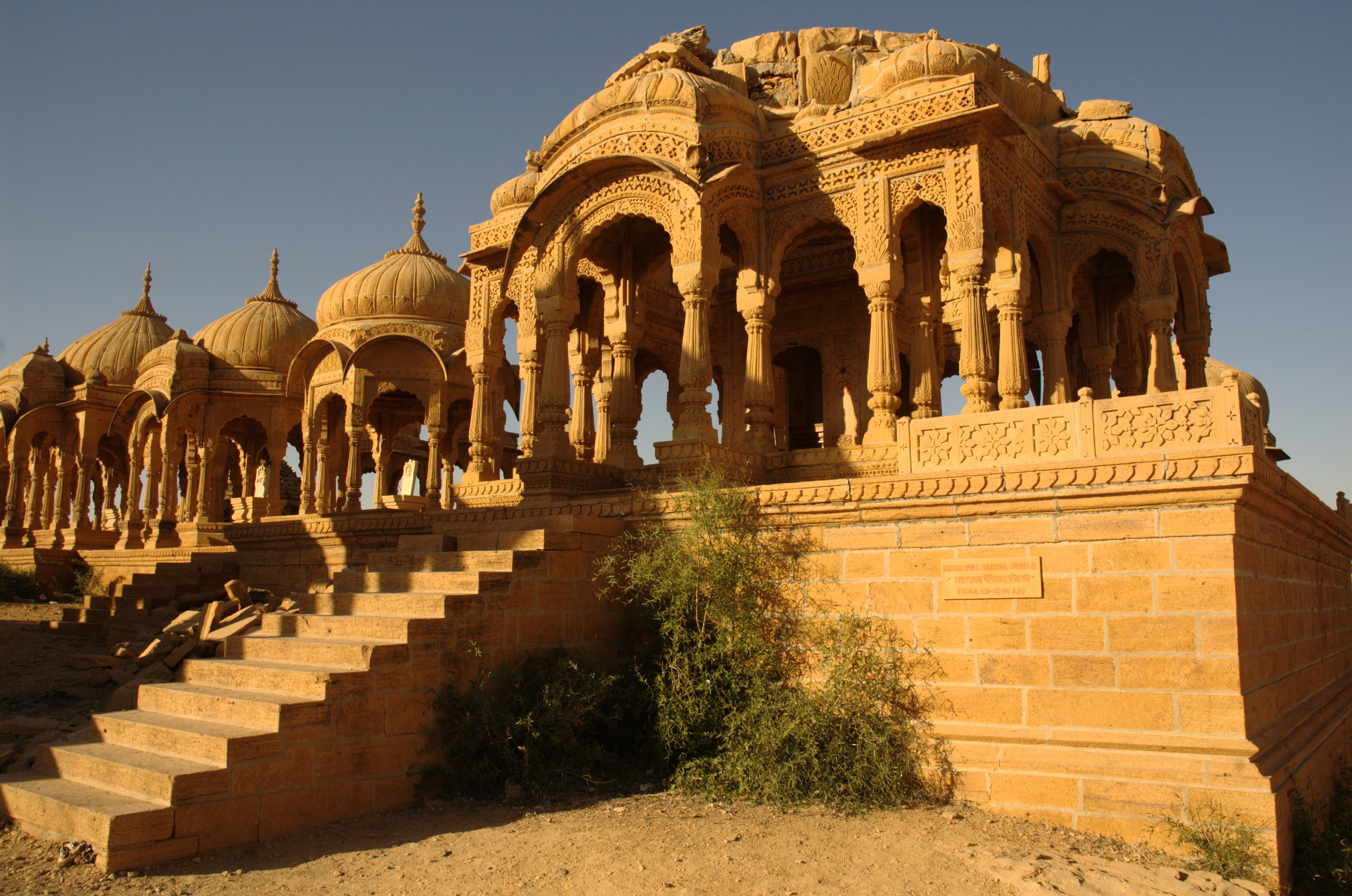
Bada Bagh, Jaisalmer, where the song "Kaatre En Vaasal" was shot.

After a 15-day schedule in Mumbai, the unit shifted to various locations to picturise a song sequence and the song "Nathiye Nathiye" was shot at the locations of Mysore, the Shivanasamudra dam, and the Thriveni Sangama. The team also shot in South India in Chalakudy and Ooty, before the unit moved North to Haridwar, Badrinath and the Gangotri. Scenes were also shot at Juinagar Station in Navi Mumbai. The song "Kaatre En Vaasal" was shot at Bada Bagh, Jaisalmer.

The film languished in production hell, with the producers reluctant to notify what was keeping the release delayed. The delay of the film led to Vasanth directing three other films in between Nerrukku Ner, Poovellam Kettuppar and Appu, as he waited for the release. At some point due to the long delay in its release, unconfirmed news was circulating that production had been shelved due to financial constraints. Natarajan blamed Rahman for the delay and it was reported that the producer had not yet settled the payment for Rahman's work in Sangamam, therefore he was dragging his feet on completing the work for Rhythm. The producer supposedly toyed with the idea of replacing Rahman with another composer in both Rhythm and his other film Udhaya but ran out of money to even complete the shooting of Rhythm. The producer then persuaded Rahman to complete work on the music of Rhythm so that he could make money from music sales and complete the film.

== Soundtrack ==
The soundtrack was composed by A. R. Rahman, with lyrics by Vairamuthu. The song titles and lyrics were inspired by the five elements wind, water, fire, sky and Earth. Rahman used the verse "Dheem Thana Na" as the pallavi (thematic line) in "Nadhiye Nadhiye" after Vasanth told Rahman that he liked that line. Three songs were later reused in the Hindi film Lakeer – Forbidden Lines.

Track listing
No.	Title	Singer(s)	Length
1.	"Nadhiye Nadhiye" (Water)	Unni Menon	6:50
2.	"Kaatre En Vasal (Raga: Darbari Kanada)" (Wind)	Kavita Krishnamurthy, Unni Krishnan	6:18
3.	"Thaniye Thannanthaniye (Raga: Ananda Bhairavi)" (Earth)	Shankar Mahadevan	5:24
4.	"Anbae Idhu" (Sky)	Sadhana Sargam	5:58
5.	"Ayyo Pathikichu" (Fire)	Udit Narayan, Vasundhara Das	5:18

Telugu (Dubbed)

All lyrics are written by Veturi

No.	Title	Singer(s)	Length
1.	"Kadhile Nadiche"	Unni Menon	6:49
2.	"Gaalena Vatikikoche"	Unnikrishnan, Kavita Krishnamurthy	6:17
3.	"Ichate Nenichate"	Shankar Mahadevan	5:26
4.	"Prema Idhi Nijamena"	Sadhana Sargam	5:56
5.	"Ayyo Paadu Chicchu"	Udit Narayan, Vasundhara Das	5:18
Total length:			29:46

== Reception ==
Malathi Rangarajan of The Hindu wrote, "Vasanth has created a smooth, flowing timbre, with very little harshness in the line of events that take place", describing it as an "appreciable effort". Saurav Bardhan from TMCafe noted the film has "outstanding performances from the lead, brilliant pairing, and a sumptuous story." Visual Dasan of Kalki praised Jyothika's acting, Rahman's music, Vinod's cinematography, Sreekar Prasad's editing and also praised Vasanth for handling an emotional story but felt the inclusion of the song "Ayyo Pattikichu" was unnecessary. Dinakaran wrote, "Though Vasanth has told two weighty flashbacks, the second one closely following the first, the interesting way in which he has handled the whole matter has highlighted the merit and cleverness of him (the director). Yet, had he reduced a little the length of the flashbacks and increased the number of events dealing with Arjun-Meena romances, the screenplay might have become a little more interesting". Another critic wrote, "Handled better, Rhythm could have turned out to be a must-watch film, though it is still definitely far better than the run-of-the-mill ones", criticising that the "director seems preoccupied with the so-called commercial ingredients, which only mar the overall impact of the film."

== Accolades ==
Shivakumar won the Tamil Nadu State Film Award for Best Audiographer, and Meena won the Cinema Express Award for Best Actress – Tamil.
