= Seetha Kalyanam (2009 film) =

- DVD cover
- Directed by: T. K. Rajeev Kumar
- Written by: T. K. Rajeev Kumar
- Produced by: Menaka; Keerthy Suresh
- Starring: Jayaram; Jyothika; Indrajith Sukumaran; Geetu Mohandas
- Cinematography: Rajeev Ravi
- Edited by: Arun Kumar Aravind
- Music by: Sreenivas; Sharreth (Background Score)
- Release date: 14 November 2009
- Country: India
- Language: Malayalam

Seetha Kalyanam is a 2009 Indian Malayalam-language family drama film written and directed by T. K. Rajeev Kumar, starring Jayaram, Jyothika (her malayalam debut film), Indrajith Sukumaran and Geetu Mohandas in her final acting credit.

== Plot ==
Sreeni, from a traditional Brahmin family, has a high paying job in Bangalore. His mother, a widow who runs a vegetarian hotel, is looking for the perfect match for him. The seemingly endless search for a perfect match has made Sreeni the butt of the jokes among his female colleagues. One of his colleagues, who is also his best friend, is Nimisha. She considers him so close that she also fights with her parents to stay back in his quarters and nurse him when he is sick. His mother finally succeeds in finding a traditional girl in Abhirami; brought up in an Aghraharam. Her father Nellayi Ramaswami is a classical musician and Abhirami had initially been promised to his disciple Ambi, but her parents ask him to forget her as Sreeni is a much better choice for her considering his stable income and family name.

The movie then shifts to the elaborate marriage ceremonies which last for a week. During this process, we are introduced to Abhirami's sister, who is unhappily married to an alcoholic and womanizing businessman who her parents had told her was a good match, forcing her to forget the love of her life, Venkidy. She questions her sister about her decision not to oppose the marriage though she was in love with Ambi. During the proceedings, Nimisha comes to realize that she was all along in love with Sreeni. She communicates her feelings to Sreeni, but both are loath to stop the marriage as it would be a big mental blow to the bride. Meanwhile, the bride's sister meets with Sreeni and informs him that Abhirami is actually in love with Ambi, and asks him to withdraw from the wedding. How the various knots are untied and lead to a happy ending forms the rest of the movie.

== Cast ==
- Jayaram as Sreeni
- Jyothika as Nimisha
- Indrajith Sukumaran as Ambi
- Geetu Mohandas as Abhirami
- Siddique as Parameswaran
- Bindu Panicker as Madurammal
- Kalpana as Ramani
- Manorama as Sreeni's mother
- Bheeman Raghu as Uslampetti Vasu
- Janardhanan as Thiruvattar Thankavelu
- Jagadish as Thampi
- Sukumari as Abhirami's mother
- Nandu as Shanmugham
- Oduvil Unnikrishnan as Nellayi Ramaswami
- Poojappura Ravi as the Priest
- Devi Ajith as Devi, Abhirami's elder sister
- Subbalakshmi
- Keerthana Anil

== Production ==
The film was actually made in 2004, but was released only on 14 November 2009. It was Jyothika's First Malayalam movie as well as the final film of Geetu Mohandas as an actress before full-time direction. It was later dubbed into Tamil with the same title but was not released. It was also the last released film of actor Oduvil Unnikrishnan, who acted in this film when he was suffering from various ailments, and died shortly after.

== Reception ==
A critic from Rediff.com wrote that "On the whole, director T K Rajeev Kumar does not succeed in indulging us in the festivities of Seetha Kalyanam". A critic from Bangalore Mirror wrote that "Jayaram looked like he'd rather be somewhere else. And less said about Jyotika, the better. You can use the comic scenes in the movie as mini intervals, as they are a torture to watch. Catch the movie when it comes on one of the Malayalam channels during Onam or Vishu. Stay away from the theatres showing it".
