= System (film) =

2026 Indian film by Ashwiny Iyer Tiwari

- Promotional release poster
- Directed by: Ashwiny Iyer Tiwari
- Written by: Harman Baweja; Arun Sukumar; Ashwini Iyer Tiwari; Tasneem Lokhandwala; Akshat Ghidial
- Produced by: Pammi Baweja; Harman Baweja; Smitha Baliga
- Starring: Sonakshi Sinha; Jyothika; Ashutosh Gowariker
- Cinematography: Rangarajan Ramabadran
- Edited by: Charu Shree Roy
- Production company: Baweja Studios
- Distributed by: Amazon Prime Video
- Release date: 22 May 2026
- Running time: 124 minutes
- Country: India
- Language: Hindi

System (stylised as SYƧTEM) is a 2026 Indian Hindi-language legal drama film directed by Ashwiny Iyer Tiwari and produced by Baweja Studios. It stars Sonakshi Sinha, Jyothika and Ashutosh Gowariker in the lead roles.

== Plot ==
Neha Rajvansh, a public prosecutor, finds herself at an uncomfortable stage in her career for not winning any case. She is challenged by her father Ravi Rajvansh, an established defense lawyer. Facing the challenge, Neha needs to win 10 cases without losing any in the process. During the challenge period, Neha meets Sarika Rawat, a courtroom stenographer. Sarika starts helping Neha by giving tips and evidence to win cases, and Neha starts winning cases with Sarika's help. After winning the ninth case, Neha's senior hands the 10th case, in which her opponent's defense lawyer is her own father, Ravi. Ravi asks Neha not to take the case, but she refuses. Both indulge in a heated conversation, after which Neha leaves her house and relocates to a house shared with Sarika. Digging deeper into the 10th case, Neha finds that Sarika did not actually help her but rather used her: all nine cases Neha won were planted by Sarika. Knowing the facts of the 10th case, Neha confronts Sarika and Sarika's reveal twists the story into intense emotional drama and an inner-psychological manner for Neha to stand on her 10th case.

== Cast ==
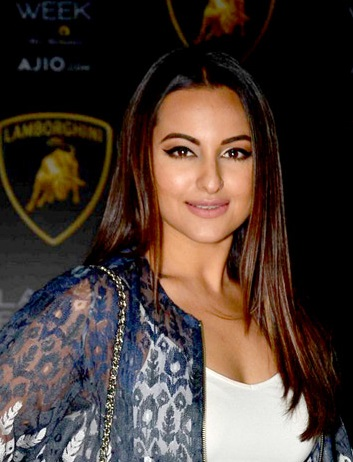
Sonakshi Sinha (top) and Jyothika (bottom) played the lead roles.
- Sonakshi Sinha as Neha Rajvansh
- Jyothika as Sarika Rawat
- Ashutosh Gowariker as Ravi Rajvansh, Neha's father
- Preeti Agarwal as Renuka Rajvansh, Neha's mother
- Adinath Kothare as Alok Rajvansh, Neha's brother
- Vijayant Kohli as Vikram Bajral
- Sayandeep Sengupta as Raghav Shrivastav
- Nishant Singh as Laxman
- Aatma Prakash Mishra as Atmaram
- Prashanth Singh as Ramnath Dhami
- Diwanshu Gambihir as Juggi
- Mohan Kant as Adv. Shyamji
- Freya Kothari as Inaaya Kothari
- Upendra Chauhan as Inspector Rathi
- Dev Chauhan as Pramod Mishra
- Pranay Narayan as Adv. Mukesh Ahlawat
- Gaurav Pandey as Akshay Rao
- Shobana Sharma as Janki Aunty
- Nikkie Bareja as Payal Jha
- Divija Gambhir as Jhanvi Shenoy
- Ajay Madhok as Jude Rajiv Menon
- Aashriya Mishra as Kusum Rawat
- Agastya Shankar as Adv. Javed Khan
- Saad Baba as Adv. Prakash Malhotra
- Ravi Mahashabe as ACP Kumar
- Reyansh Goswami as Reyan
- Sachit Murthy as Judge Kumar
- Micky Makhija as Judge Ramaswamy
- Aneesha Das as Ruksana
- Jayshree Soliya as Guard

== Release ==
System was released on Amazon Prime Video on 22 May 2026.

== Reception ==
On the review aggregator website Rotten Tomatoes, 54% of 13 critics' reviews are positive, with an average rating of 5.8/10.

Anuj Kumar of The Hindu writes that "Sinha and Jyotika stand out in this polished critique of the idea of justice in the garb of a legal thriller, but Ashwiny Iyer Tiwari’s System loses its edge when its loops become too easy to read"., Shubhra Gupta of The Indian Express gave 2.5 stars out of 5 and writes that "The strength of Sonakshi Sinha-Jyotika film is showing the two women bent upon earning their living their way, and making their choices. It goes well until it falls into Bollywood's oldest traps". Rishabh Suri of Hindustan Times said that the film was "not an edge-of-the-seat thriller, but a more nuanced take on justice." Bollywood Hungama rated it 3/5 stars and said that the film was an unusual film that "works due to its drama, the dynamics between the characters and the performances of the lead actors. However, the writing gets too convenient after a point, thereby diluting the impact". Rahul Desai of The Hollywood Reporter India observed that it is "A system rigged against storytelling".

Nandini Ramnath of Scroll.in writes that the film was both "courtroom drama and murder mystery, which leads to an unconvincing and bland denouement." Sukanya Verma of Rediff.com gave it 2.5 stars out of 5 and observed that the film "falls short due to muddled narrative and uninspired execution." Archika Khurana of The Times of India gave 3 stars out of 5 and said that the film may not be a "flawless courtroom drama, but it succeeds in presenting a socially relevant story with sincerity and strong performances." Kartik Bhardwaj of The New Indian Express rated it 3/5 stars and writes that the film "doesn't seem to be in a rush to thrill or excite just to keep the viewer hooked and takes needed time to cook." Lachmi Deb Roy of Firstpost praised the film and wrote that "Not just Sonakshi Sinha, it is Jyotika's terrific performance in Ashwiny Iyer Tiwari’s directorial film which will steal your heart. And what a beautifully restrained way of storytelling."

== Awards & Nominations ==
- Best Director award at the Iconic Gold Streaming Awards - Ashwiny Iyer Tiwari
- Best Actress award at the Iconic Gold Streaming Awards - Jyothika
- Asian Academy Creative Award for Best Actress in a Supporting Role - Jyothika
- Nominated ;
- Filmfare OTT Awards for Best Film, Web Original - Pammi Baweja, Harman Baweja & Smitha Baliga
- Filmfare OTT Awards for Best Director, Web Original Film - Ashwiny Iyer Tiwari
- Filmfare OTT Awards for Best Actor, Web Original Film (Female) - Sonakshi Sinha
- Filmfare OTT Awards for Best Supporting Actor, Web Original Film (Female) - Jyothika
