= Filmfare Critics Award for Best Actress – Malayalam =

Indian annual film award

- Awarded for: Best performance by an actress in Malayalam films
- Country: India
- Presented by: Filmfare
- First award: 2015
- Currently held by: Zarin Shihab for Aattam (2024)

The Filmfare Critics Award for Best Actress – Malayalam is given by Filmfare as part of its annual Filmfare Awards South for Malayalam films. The award is given by a jury of selected critics.

== Winners ==
Year	Actress	Role	Film	Ref.
2015	Amala Paul	Mili Nair	Mili	
2016	Shruthy Menon	Anitha	Kismath	
2017	Manju Warrier	Sujatha Krishnan	Udaharanam Sujatha	
2018	Nimisha Sajayan	Aishwarya Gopal	Eeda	
2019	AWARDS FUNCTION WAS SUSPENDED DUE TO COVID-19 PANDEMIC			
2020–2021	Kani Kusruti	Khadeeja	Biriyaani	
2022	Revathi	Asha	Bhoothakaalam	
2023	Jyothika	Omana Philip Mathew	Kaathal – The Core	
2024	Zarin Shihab	Anjali	Aattam	

== See also ==
- Filmfare Critics Award for Best Actor – Malayalam
