= Vaalee (1999 film) =

1999 film by S. J. Surya

- Poster
- Directed by: S. J. Suryah
- Written by: S. J. Suryah
- Produced by: S. S. Chakravarthy
- Starring: Ajith Kumar; Simran; Jyothika
- Cinematography: Jeeva
- Edited by: B. Lenin; V. T. Vijayan
- Music by: Deva
- Production company: NIC Arts
- Release date: 1 May 1999
- Running time: 167 minutes
- Country: India
- Language: Tamil

Vaalee is a 1999 Indian Tamil-language romantic psychological thriller film written and directed by S. J. Suryah (in his directorial debut). The film stars Ajith Kumar in the main dual lead role with Simran and Jyothika (in her Tamil debut). Vivek, Rajeev, Pandu and Sujitha appear in supporting roles. It revolves around identical twins Shiva and Deva, the latter being deaf-mute. He lusts for Shiva's love interest Priya, an obsession that continues even after their marriage.

Suryah completed the script for Vaalee in 60 days, and the project was picked up for production by S. S. Chakravarthy of NIC Arts. It is Ajith's first film to feature him in dual roles. The film's title is a reference to Vali from the Hindu epic Ramayana. The cinematography was handled by Jeeva, the music by Deva, and the editing was done by the duo B. Lenin and V. T. Vijayan.

Vaalee was released on 1 May 1999 to positive reviews. The film became a commercial success, and a major breakthrough for Ajith, Simran and Jyothika. Ajith won the Filmfare Award for Best Actor – Tamil and Jyothika won Best Female Debut – South at the same ceremony. The film was remade in Kannada under the same title in 2001.

== Plot ==
Shiva and Deva are identical twin brothers. Deva, the elder, is deaf-mute; but he is an expert at lip reading, and the head of a successful advertising company. Shiva loves and trusts his brother. Shiva falls in love with Priya, who wants to marry someone who is an ex-smoker, ex-drunkard, and got ditched by a girl but is pining for her. Learning this, Shiva, with the help of his friend Vicky, invents a romance between him and a certain Sona, and wins Priya's love. Soon Priya realises Shiva's trick and breaks up with him. He tries to tell her that he only cheated and lied to her in the old romance story, but he truly loved her. One day, Priya comes to Shiva's house and slaps him, but eventually she reciprocates his love.

Meanwhile, Deva chances upon Priya and lusts for her. His obsession continues even after his brother marries her and he devises various means of getting close to Priya and keeping Shiva and her apart. Some of the methods Deva uses to woo Priya are masochistic (wounding his hand by the running car engine to stop the couple's wedding night) and psychotic (repeated attempts to murder his brother).

While Shiva is away at work as a substitute for his injured brother, Priya looks after Deva. Priya soon realises the intentions Deva has towards her, but Shiva refuses to believe her and has complete trust in his brother. He even goes as far as to take Priya to a psychiatrist. To get away from it all, Shiva and Priya go on a long-delayed honeymoon, but Deva shows up there. Shiva watches Deva touching Priya's dress and kissing her photo and he realises that she was right all along. Deva beats up Shiva, packs him in a gunny bag, and throws him into a lorry.

Deva disguises himself as Shiva and tries to seduce Priya. Shiva calls her to warn her that Deva is there but Deva picks up the call. She thinks that Shiva told Deva where they are and the one on the phone is Deva's assistant Sudha who called her to tell that Deva might injure himself to disturb their honeymoon. She takes off the phone's wire so that he will not call them back. Shiva then hastens to the house to save Priya from Deva.

Soon, Priya learns that he is Deva and escapes from him, then shoots him with a revolver. Deva falls into the nearby pool unconscious, and when Shiva comes, Priya narrates the whole incident to him. He hugs and apologises to her for not believing her earlier, for taking her to the psychiatrist without knowing the truth and for trusting Deva without knowing his intentions towards her. Suddenly, Deva regains consciousness, but Shiva kills him with the revolver. In the afterlife, Deva talks about his inability to express his feelings for Priya because he was mute.

== Cast ==
- Ajith Kumar in a dual role as:
  - Shiva
  - Deva
- Simran as Priya
- Jyothika as Sona / Meena
- Livingston as Livi (guest appearance)
- Vivek as Vicky
- Rajeev as Uma's husband
- Pandu as B. Velu Nair
- Rathan as Lakshman, Priya's father
- Balaji as Aadhimoolam, Vicky's patient
- Halwa Vasu as a roadside shop owner
- Radhabhai as Shiva's and Deva's grandmother
- Indhu as Uma
- Sujitha as Sheela

Uncredited

- N. Mathrubootham as himself
- Devipriya as Sudha

== Production ==
=== Development ===
S. J. Suryah had worked as an assistant director in Vasanth's Aasai (1995) which featured Ajith Kumar in the main lead as well as working with him during the making of Ullaasam (1997). Ajith asked Suryah to prepare a good script and promised he would give him a chance to make his directorial debut. After Suryah completed the script of Vaalee in 60 days, the pair approached S. S. Chakravarthy to produce the film. The film's title is a reference to Vali, a character from the Hindu epic Ramayana. The comedy track was credited to Vivek. Thota Tharani served as the art director.

=== Casting ===
Keerthi Reddy was announced to be the lead actress in the film in December 1997, though she was replaced by Simran before filming began. Roja and Meena also were approached to play the female lead but both of them could not allocate the dates. Jyothika, sister of actress Nagma, made her Tamil debut in the film as an imaginary character, Sona. She said she was initially offered the female lead role, but declined due to scheduling conflicts with Doli Saja Ke Rakhna (1998). Livingston made a guest appearance as it was Suryah's wish that he appear in at least one scene. This is the first film where Ajith played two characters. Ajith mentioned that Vaalee "was very close to my heart and I gave it everything I had", adding that he had initially received widespread negative publicity and scepticism for doing a dual role too early in his career. A stand-in that looked similar to Ajith was used in the film. G. Marimuthu, who worked as an assistant director for the film, also played a minor role.

=== Filming ===
Ravi Varman initially worked as the film's cinematographer but left after facing issues from the Film Employees Federation of South India. Cinematography was completed by Jeeva, while M. S. Prabhu was credited for additional cinematography. The scene where Shiva answers a phone call was shot at a bungalow in Boat Club Road, Chennai. According to Suryah, this scene was the first shot he composed and it involved meticulous planning. Another scene was planned to show Shiva having shaved his moustache to differentiate from Deva, only to see he has shaved as well. The scene went unfilmed due to Ajith's refusal to shave his moustache which he needed for another film. A part of the song "Oh Sona" was shot at the Broken Bridge, Chennai. Simran's voice was dubbed by Savitha Radhakrishnan. The film was edited by B. Lenin and V. T. Vijayan.

== Themes and influences ==
Suryah wanted the dual roles in the film to be different from other films like Neerum Neruppum (1971) and Apoorva Sagodharargal (1989), in which the two roles played by the same actor were physically distinct. He made both the characters look physically the same, with one being normal and one being deaf-mute. Suryah said the positive and negative contrast between both characters were supposed to signify the split personality that everyone inherently has.

== Soundtrack ==
The soundtrack was composed by Deva and lyrics were written by Vairamuthu. The song "Oh Sona" is based on "Susanna" by VOF de Kunst, and "Where Do I Begin?", the theme to Love Story composed by Francis Lai. "Oh Sona" and "April Maadathil" were well received upon release.

Track listing
No.	Title	Singer(s)	Length
1.	"Oh Sona"	Hariharan, Ajith Kumar (speaking portions), Febi Mani	6:03
2.	"Gee Priya"	S. P. Balasubrahmanyam, Swarnalatha	5:28
3.	"Nilavai Konduva"	P. Unnikrishnan, Anuradha Sriram	6:05
4.	"Vaanil Kaayuthae"	Mano, Anuradha Sriram, S. J. Suryah	6:27
5.	"April Maathathil"	P. Unnikrishnan, Harini	5:28
Total length:			29:31

== Release ==
Vaalee was released on 1 May 1999, coinciding with Ajith's 28th birthday. The film became a huge commercial success, and was also successful in Kerala where it ran for over 100 days in theatres. It provided a major breakthrough for Ajith, Simran and Jyothika's careers. The film was dubbed and released in Telugu under the same title later that year.

=== Critical reception ===
Vaalee received positive reviews from critics. Lakshmi of Deccan Herald described the film as "definitely worth seeing", saying it "has something for all tastes – a pleasant love angle, some suspense, complex psychological nuances, good acting, pleasing songs" while praising Ajith's performance. The New Indian Express labelled Simran's portrayal as "outstanding" while mentioning Suryah does a "fairly good job and succeeds". K. P. S. of Kalki appreciated Deva's music, the performances of Ajith and Simran, and Jeeva's cinematography, adding that Suryah's future as a director seemed bright.

Ananda Vikatan appreciated the film by giving 45 marks and mentioned "Director SJ Suryah established his stamp of film-making in his very first film by taking up a straight line story with an engaging screenplay and realistic dialogues. Ajith Kumar has done a fantastic job in dual role and Simran also proved that she can act". K. N. Vijiyan of New Straits Times wrote, "It is amazing what fresh ideas new directors can come out with [...] Using a simple story, Suryah has come out with a winner". D. S. Ramanujam of The Hindu wrote, "Rich production values, fine performances by Ajit Kumar (playing the dual role of brothers) and Simran, bold and powerful dialogue by S. J. Surya, who has directed the movie based on his story and screenplay, are the major contributing factor[s]" in the film.

Reviewing the Telugu-dubbed version, Griddaluru Gopalrao of Zamin Ryot wrote that the director's style of narration sets a good pace for a simple story. Gopalrao also praised the effort put into the dubbing and Ajith and Simran's performances. A critic from Andhra Today wrote that the film "is sure to find favor with audience with different taste".

=== Accolades ===
Award	Category	Recipient	Ref.
47th Filmfare Awards South	Best Actor – Tamil	Ajith Kumar	
47th Filmfare Awards South	Best Female Debut – South	Jyothika	
Cinema Express Awards	Best Actor – Tamil	Ajith Kumar	
Cinema Express Awards	Best Actress – Tamil	Simran	
Cinema Express Awards	Best Newface Actress of the Year	Jyothika	
Cinema Express Awards	Best Music Director	Deva	
Cinema Express Awards	Best Comedian	Vivek	
Dinakaran Film Awards	Best Actor	Ajith Kumar	
Dinakaran Film Awards	Best Actress	Simran	
Dinakaran Film Awards	Best Debut Actress	Jyothika	

== Remakes ==
Mahesh Babu had shown interest in starring in a potential Telugu remake of Vaalee; however, Suryah refused to remake the film in any other language, with it being dubbed in Telugu instead. Vaalee was remade in Kannada under the same title (2001). After Boney Kapoor entered negotiations with Chakravarthy to acquire the remake rights for Hindi and other languages, Suryah attempted to block Chakravarthy from selling the remake rights by filing a case in the Madras High Court, but his plea was rejected. Kapoor and Chakravarthy's deal was closed by August 2020. In November 2021, Suryah appealed to the Supreme Court of India, using a 2017 verdict by the Madras High Court that only the screenwriter holds the remake rights to his own film, but on 25 April 2022, the Supreme Court rejected his plea: "There can be no dispute that in respect of a cinematograph film, it is the producer of the film who is the owner of the copyright in the cinematograph film itself".

== Legacy ==
After A. M. Rathnam watched the premiere show of Vaalee, he decided to produce Suryah's next film Kushi (2000). The plot of the 2007 Telugu film Hello Premistara was noted by some critics for its similarities with Vaalee. The sub-plot involving the photograph of an imaginary person named Sona and the fact that she actually exists in real life inspired the plot of the Telugu film Maska (2009). Simran reprised her role as Priya in a cameo appearance in Good Bad Ugly (2025). The scene where Deva lustfully touches Priya's hair was used in Kaalidas 2 (2026).

== Bibliography ==
- Dhananjayan, G. (2011). The Best of Tamil Cinema, 1931 to 2010: 1977–2010. Galatta Media. OCLC 733724281.
