= Gulabi Talkies =

- DVD cover
- Directed by: Girish Kasaravalli
- Screenplay by: Girish Kasaravalli
- Story by: Vaidehi
- Based on: Gulabi Talkies and Other Stories by Vaidehi
- Produced by: Amrutha Patil; Basanth Kumar Patil
- Starring: Umashree; M. D. Pallavi; K. G. Krishna Murthy
- Cinematography: S. Ramachandra
- Edited by: M. N. Swamy; S. Manohar
- Music by: Isaac Thomas Kottukapally
- Distributed by: Basanth Productions
- Release date: 2 September 2008 (India)
- Running time: 123 minutes
- Country: India
- Language: Kannada

Gulabi Talkies is a 2008 Indian Kannada language drama film by acclaimed Indian director Girish Kasaravalli. The film stars Umashree in the title role, M. D. Pallavi and K. G. Krishna Murthy. It is based on a short story by the same name by Kannada writer Vaidehi.

== Plot ==
The film is set in the late 1990s among the fishing communities around Kundapura, in the southwestern Indian state of Karnataka. The impulsive midwife Gulabi (Umashree) is the protagonist, whose one passion is the cinema. She leads a lonely life in an island inhabited by fisher folk. Her husband Musa (K.G. Krishna Murthy), a small-time fish-selling agent, has deserted her and is living happily with his second wife Kunjipathu and their child Adda.

A family gifts her a television with a satellite dish antenna in gratitude after she attends to a difficult delivery (for which they even had to bodily remove her from a movie theatre). The arrival of the first color TV in her small island village heralds great changes in the sleepy hamlet. The women in the village begin gathering at her house once the men leave for fishing. However, a few of them stay away, since Gulabi is one of the few Muslims in the village. Yet others prefer to watch from outside her shack, without entering it.

Among the regulars at her home is Netru (M. D. Pallavi), a girl with an absentee husband and a domineering mother-in-law, whom Gulabi befriends and becomes a confidante to. But Netru disappears and Gulabi is blamed, leaving her all alone in the village.

The Kargil War of 1999 and the rise of communalism in Karnataka provide the backdrop to the film. The communal stereotyping of Muslims following the Kargil War finds an echo in the village. The tension between the small fishermen of the village and a Muslim businessman (who is actually never shown throughout the film) with a growing fleet of commercial trawlers acquires a communal color.

The disappearance of Netru adds to the mounting tensions. The Muslims in the village flee and urge Gulabi to leave too, but she refuses and stays put in the village. Her house is vandalized and she is forcibly taken to a boat to leave the island. The young men from outside who spearhead the attack assure the villagers that Gulabi's television would remain in her house.

The film ends with a scene in which two illiterate elderly women, who had hitherto refused to enter Gulabi's house, going in there to watch TV (which they do not know how to switch on – they are probably unaware even that it has to be switched on).

== Cast ==
- Umashree as Gulabi
- K.G. Krishna Murthy as Musa
- M. D. Pallavi as Netru
- Poornima Mohan as Musa's second wife

== Reception ==
=== Critical response ===
R G Vijayasarathy of Rediff.com scored the film at 5 out of 5 stars and wrote "The director has used many local artists in the film who have also delivered very good performances. Camera work by Ramachandra and background score by Issac Thomas Kottukapalli are top class. By all yardsticks, Gulab Talkies is an outstanding film that cannot be missed". A critic from The Hollywood Reporter wrote "Natural and authentic, the movie also scores with its top-rate performances. Umashree is excellent as a barren woman, shunned by her husband, but sought after by the people for her warmth and geniality. She conveys the pain and pathos of her paradoxical life with a subtlety rarely seen on the Indian screen. Krishnamurthy and Sandip are engaging as the two fishermen troubled and tormented by dwindling supplies, rising tempers and a widening chasm between religions". Jay Weissberg of Variety wrote "Vet d.p. Ramachandra Aithal lenses the watery domains with the eye of a sympathetic observer, making the most of the evocative production design. Color processing, at least on the DVD viewed, is on the cheaper side".

== Awards and recognition ==
- Karnataka State Film Awards 2007-08
  - Best Film
  - Best Screenplay – Girish Kasaravalli
  - Best Actress – Umashree
- 55th National Film Awards
  - Best Actress – Umashree
  - Best Feature Film in Kannada
