= Simran filmography =

Filmography article

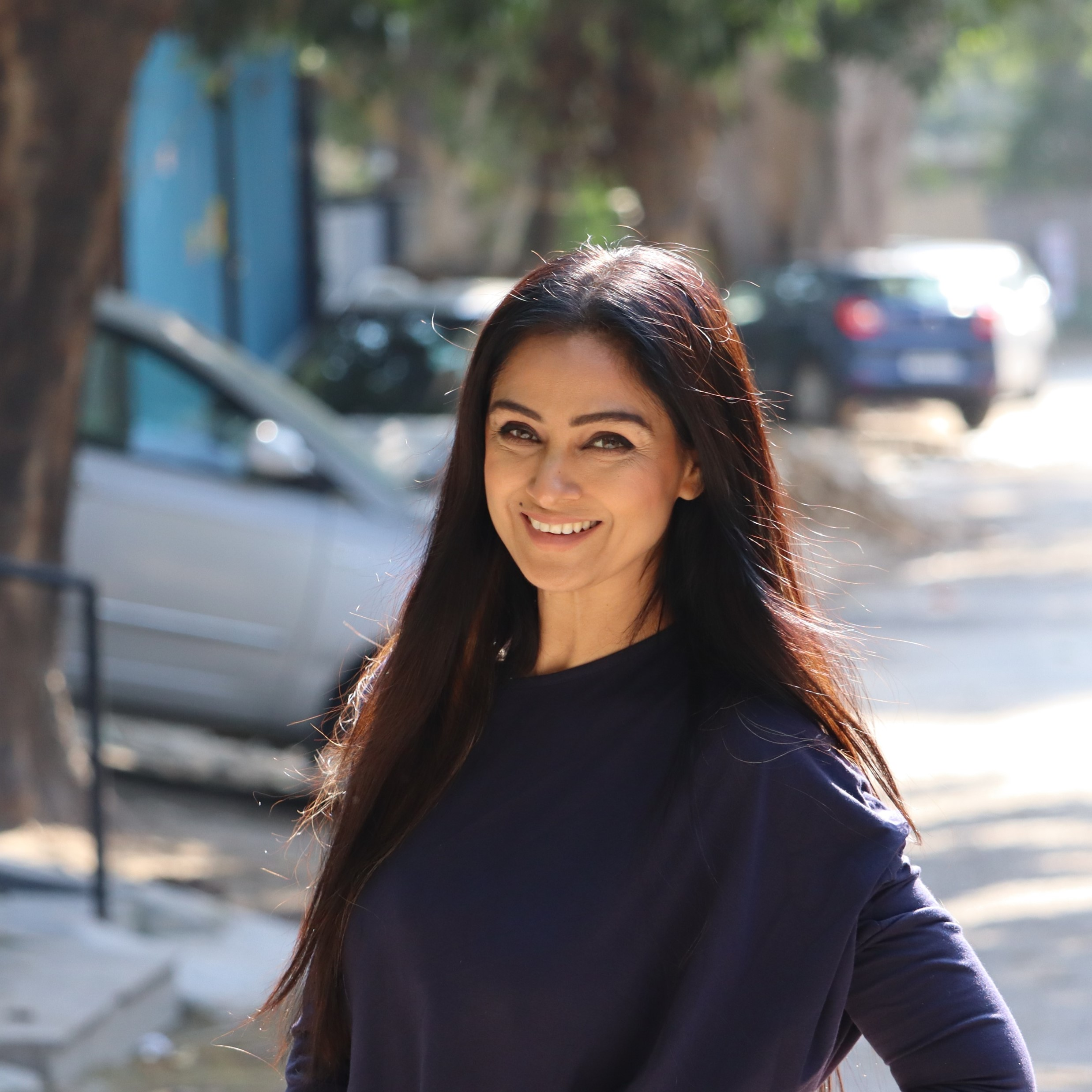
Simran in 2023

Simran is an Indian actress and film producer known for her works in Tamil and Telugu films. She has also appeared in Hindi, Malayalam and Kannada films. She is well noted for her dancing and acting skills in the Indian film industry. After her marriage, Simran took a break from acting in films and moved on to the small screen where she acted in Jaya TV's serial Simran Thirai, which consisted of mini-serials all featuring Simran and included many popular stars such as Ramji, Raaghav, Saakshi Siva and Abitha playing supporting roles. In 2009, she started acting in the Telugu serial Sundarakanda, telecast on Gemini TV, where she did a guest role. The serial was dubbed in Tamil as Sundarakandam and telecast on Polimer TV. In 2012, she hosted Jackpot, a game show on Jaya TV which was earlier hosted by Khushbu and Nadhiya. She acted in Agni Paravai, a serial telecast in Puthuyugam TV. She played as a main judge on the reality show Dance Tamizha Dance, which was produced by her and her husband Mr Deepak Bagga for Zee Tamizh.

Simran made a return in 2008 with Okka Magadu, opposite Balakrishna, John Appa Rao 40 plus and Seval. Her role as Suriya's wife and mother in Gautham Vasudev Menon's Vaaranam Aayiram was critically acclaimed and she won Filmfare and Vijay awards for the same. She starred in the Tamil films TN-07 AL 4777 and Ainthaam Padai in 2009. She made a brief appearance in Aaha Kalyanam in 2014 and Trisha Illana Nayanthara in 2015. In October 2015, after the successful completion of two seasons of "Dance Tamizha Dance" in her own production, Simran and her husband set up a production studio called Simran & Sons, and launched two new film projects. In 2018, she was approached to play a negative role by Ponram opposite Sivakarthikeyan in Seemaraja. In July 2018, Sun Pictures announced that Simran had joined the cast in their production venture Petta for the first time in her career to play opposite Rajinikanth, to be directed by the notable director Karthik Subbaraj. Simran's recent commercial success in Tourist Family reconsolidated her status as one of the most celebrated Tamil actresses of her time.

== Film ==
Key
†	Denotes films that have not yet been released

List of Simran film credits
Year	Title	Role	Language	Notes	Ref.
1995	Sanam Harjai	Tina	Hindi		
1996	Muqadar	Pooja	Hindi		
1996	Bal Bramhachari	Seema Choudhary	Hindi		
1996	Indraprastham	Chitra	Malayalam		
1996	Angaara	Pooja Pascal	Hindi		
1996	Tere Mere Sapne	Pooja Mathur	Hindi		
1997	Abbai Gari Pelli	Madhumitha	Telugu		
1997	Agnee Morcha	Mantri	Hindi		
1997	Gunda Gardi	Guddi	Hindi		
1997	Simhada Mari	Usha	Kannada		
1997	Once More	Kavitha	Tamil		
1997	V. I. P.	Priya	Tamil		
1997	Daadagiri	Uma	Hindi		
1997	Nerrukku Ner	Asha	Tamil		
1997	Priya O Priya	Priya	Telugu	Dubbed in Tamil as Idhuthan Kaathal	
1997	Maa Nannaku Pelli	Lahari	Telugu		
1997	Poochudava	Nandini	Tamil		
1998	Kondattam	Lalitha	Tamil		
1998	Auto Driver	Sandhya	Telugu		
1998	Aval Varuvala	Divya	Tamil		
1998	Natpukkaga	Prabhavathi	Tamil		
1998	Kannedhirey Thondrinal	Priya	Tamil		
1999	Samarasimha Reddy	Sampangi	Telugu		
1999	Thullatha Manamum Thullum	Rukmani	Tamil		
1999	Kachche Dhaage	Herself	Hindi	Special appearance in song "Khali Dil Nahi"	
1999	Edhirum Pudhirum	Herself	Tamil	Special appearance in the song "Totthu Totthu"	
1999	Anari No.1	Sona	Hindi		
1999	Vaalee	Priya	Tamil		
1999	Kanave Kalaiyadhe	Amrita and Saradha	Tamil	Dual role	
1999	Anthahpuram	Herself	Tamil	Special appearance in the song "Mana Madurai"	
1999	Jodi	Gayathri	Tamil		
1999	Kannupada Poguthaiya	Gowri	Tamil		
1999	Time	Thulasi	Tamil		
2000	Annayya	Herself	Telugu	Special appearance in song "Aata Kavala"	
2000	Kalisundam Raa	Manga	Telugu		
2000	Khauff	Ritu Pereira	Hindi		
2000	Nuvvu Vasthavani	Indira (Indu)	Telugu		
2000	Yuvaraju	Srilatha	Telugu		
2000	Unnai Kodu Ennai Tharuven	Indu	Tamil		
2000	Goppinti Alludu	Sowmya	Telugu		
2000	Parthen Rasithen	Banu	Tamil		
2000	Priyamaanavale	Priya	Tamil		
2001	Sabse Badkar Hum	—N/a	Hindi		
2001	Mrugaraju	Aiswarya	Telugu		
2001	Narasimha Naidu	Sravani	Telugu		
2001	Prematho Raa	Geetha	Telugu		
2001	Bava Nachadu	Kamakshi	Telugu		
2001	12B	Priya	Tamil		
2001	Daddy	Shanthi	Telugu		
2001	Parthale Paravasam	Simi Madhava	Tamil		
2002	Seema Simham	Hema	Telugu		
2002	Pammal K. Sambandam	Janaki	Tamil		
2002	Dhaya	Herself	Tamil	Special appearance in the song "Thorakkaatha Pettiya"	
2002	Kannathil Muthamittal	Indira Thiruchelvan	Tamil		
2002	Thamizh	Meenakshi	Tamil		
2002	Ezhumalai	Lakshmi	Tamil		
2002	Panchathantiram	Mythili	Tamil		
2002	Youth	Herself	Tamil	Special appearance in the song "Aalthotta Boopathi"	
2002	Ramana	Chithra	Tamil	Cameo appearance	
2002	I Love You Daa	Priya	Tamil		
2003	Pop Carn	Jamuna	Tamil		
2003	Raghavendra	Herself	Telugu	Special appearance in song "Calcutta Pan"	
2003	Arasu	Meera Shastri	Tamil		
2003	Kovilpatti Veeralakshmi	Veeralakshmi	Tamil		
2003	Seetayya	Bangaram / Pentamma	Telugu		
2003	Ottran	Sudha	Tamil		
2003	Pithamagan	Herself	Tamil	Special appearance in the song "Aruna Runaam"	
2004	Jai	Herself	Tamil	Special appearance in the song "Alek"	
2004	Udhaya	Vasanthi	Tamil		
2004	Yuva	College student	Hindi	Uncredited role	
2004	New	Priya	Tamil		
2005	Kichaa Vayasu 16	Nirmala	Tamil		
2005	Inidhu Inidhu Kaadhal Inidhu	Herself	Tamil	Special appearance in the song "Naan Puttam Pudiyai"	
2007	Heart Beats	Thangam George	Malayalam		
2007	Vijayadasami	Herself	Telugu	Special appearance	
2008	Okka Magaadu	Sharada	Telugu		
2008	John Appa Rao 40 Plus	Pravalika	Telugu		
2008	Seval	Gayathri	Tamil		
2008	Vaaranam Aayiram	Malini Krishnan	Tamil		
2009	TN-07 AL 4777	Subhalakshmi Mani	Tamil		
2009	Ainthaam Padai	Devasena Karunakaran	Tamil		
2014	Aaha Kalyanam	Chandralekha	Tamil		
2015	Trisha Illana Nayanthara	Simran	Tamil		
2015	Alone	Anjali	Kannada	Guest appearance	
2016	Karai Oram	Anjali	Tamil	Guest appearance	
2017	Koditta Idangalai Nirappuga	Love Guru	Tamil	Guest appearance	
2017	Thupparivaalan	Mrs. Diwakar	Tamil	Cameo appearance	
2018	Odu Raja Odu	Kala Bhairavi	Tamil	Cameo appearance	
2018	Seemaraja	Kaaleeshwari	Tamil		
2019	Petta	Mangalam	Tamil		
2020	Paava Kadhaigal	Madhi	Tamil		
2022	Mahaan	Naachiyaar "Naachi"	Tamil		
2022	Rocketry: The Nambi Effect	Meena Narayanan	English	Trilingual film	
2022	Rocketry: The Nambi Effect	Meena Narayanan	Tamil	Trilingual film	
2022	Rocketry: The Nambi Effect	Meena Narayanan	Hindi	Trilingual film	
2022	Captain	Keerthi	Tamil		
2023	Gulmohar	Indira Batra	Hindi		
2023	Tiger 3	Nasreen Irani	Hindi		
2024	Aranmanai 4	Herself	Tamil	Special appearance in the song "Amman"	
2024	Andhagan	Simi	Tamil		
2025	Sabdham	Diana	Tamil		
2025	Good Bad Ugly	Priya	Tamil	Cameo appearance	
2025	Tourist Family	Vasanthi	Tamil		
2026	Dhruva Natchathiram †	TBA	Tamil	Awaiting release	
2026	Teacher †	TBA	Tamil	Filming	
2026	Gabru †	TBA	Hindi	Post-production	
2027	Dharman †	TBA	Tamil	Filming	
	Kamal Sridevi	TBA	Tamil	Filming	

== Television ==
List of Simran television credits
Year	Title	Role	Language	Channel	Ref.
1995	Superhit Muqabla	Host	Hindi	Doordarshan	
2008	Simran Thirai	Multiple roles	Tamil	Jaya TV	
2008	Super Super	Main Judge	Tamil	Jaya TV	
2010–2011	Sundarakanda	Jayashree	Telugu	Gemini TV	
2010–2013	Jackpot (Season 2)	Host	Tamil	Jaya TV	
2013	Dance Tamizha Dance Season I	Main Judge	Tamil	Zee Tamizh	
2013–2014	Agni Paravai	Madhavi	Tamil	Puthuyugam TV	
2014	Dance Tamizha Dance Little Masters Season II	Main Judge	Tamil	Zee Tamizh	
2023	The Kapil Sharma Show	Herself	Hindi	Sony Entertainment Television	
2024	Citadel: Honey Bunny	Zooni Shatsang	Hindi	Amazon Prime Video	
2026	Dance Jodi Dance season 4	Judge	Tamil	Zee Tamil	

== See also ==
- List of awards and nominations received by Simran
