= Savitha Radhakrishnan =

Indian voice actor

- Other name: Savitha Reddy
- Occupation: Voice actor / dubbing artist
- Years active: 1986–present

Savitha Radhakrishnan is an Indian voice actor. She is known for providing voice-overs for several leading female actresses in Tamil and Telugu cinema, including Aishwarya Rai, Simran, Sneha, Jyothika, Trisha and Nayanthara.

== Career ==
Radhakrishnan made her debut as a child voice actor in a film for Sujitha and continued for many movies as a voice actor in both Tamil and Telugu movies. She later as a teen dubbed for female lead actress Vinodhini for a Tamil movie Annai Vayal (1992). Her major break was with Jeans lending her voice to Aishwarya Rai's character. An M.B.A. graduate who majored in advertising from Annamalai University, she first received attention when the Indian cinema director Shankar selected her to lend her voice for the then Miss World Aishwarya Rai in Jeans. In Telugu, her first work was for Simran in Kalisundam Raa and later she went on to lend her voice for Simran in all most all her movies. She has lent her voice for Aarthi Agarwal from her debut film Nuvvu Naaku Nachav, "I got the Nandi award for this movie," recalls Radhakrishnan. She lent voice for Trisha's first Telugu film, Varsham, Richa's in Nuvve Kavali, and for Asin in Amma Nanna O Tamila Ammayi, she lent her voice a lot for Simran, Jyothika and Trisha. Her major works are Thullatha Manamum Thullum, Kushi, Priyamanavale, Panchathantiram, Dhool, Chandramukhi, and Sillunu Oru Kaadhal. In the movie Deiva Thirumagal she lent her voice for Amala Paul whereas her daughter lent her voice for Sara Arjun.

She lent her voice for Jyothika in the Tamil film Chandramukhi, and subsequently dubbed for Kangana Ranaut in Chandramukhi 2. She has dubbed for Simran and Jyothika in the same film, 12B. She had also lent her voice for the actress playing Nina's character in Chitti serial. In Parthiban Kanavu she lent her voice for Sneha for one of her dual appearances.

== List of movies dubbed ==
Voice actor for / character	Movies
A child actor	Repati Pourulu (1986)
Baby Sujitha	Manthira Punnagai (1986); Kadhal Parisu (1987)
A child actor	Sippikkul Muthu (1986); Kaalaiyum Neeye Maalaiyum Neeye (1988)
Vinodhini	Annai Vayal (1992)
Yuvarani	Minmini Poochigal (1993); Mappillai Manasu Poopola (1996)
For Kunti Devi character	Pandavas: The Five Warriors (2000) (animation film)
Charmila	Kizhakke Varum Paattu (1993); Musthaffaa (1996)
Rambha	Sabhash Ramu (1994; Tamil dubbed); Jiththan (1995; Tamil dubbed); Ganesh (1998; Tamil dubbed); Sudhandhiram (2000); Azhagana Naatkal (2001)
Sanghavi	Naatamai (1994); Muthukulikka Vaariyala (1995); Kolangal (1995); Thaalikaatha Kaaliamman (2001)
Keerthana	Pathavi Pramanam (1994)
Aishwarya	Makkal Aatchi (1995)
Indraja	Rajavin Parvaiyile (1995)
Subhashri	Muthu (1995); Minor Mappillai (1996)
Raakhi Malhotra	Udhavum Karangal (1995)
Sirisha	Ilaya Ragam (1995)
Jeeva	Vasantha Vaasal (1996)
Annam	Vaikarai Pookkal (1996)
Anusha	Rajali (1996); Adra Sakka Adra Sakka (1997)
Mohini	Thayagam (1996)
Devayani	Kalloori Vaasal (1996); Naani (2004)
Manthra	Priyam (1996); Kalyana Galatta (1998)
Heera	Avvai Shanmughi (1996); Sundara Pandian (1998); Pooveli (1998); Thodarum (1999)
Reeva	Selva (1996)
Sakshi Shivanand	Pudhayal (1997); Singanadai (1999); Yuvaraju (2000); Vedham (2001)
Divya	Kaadhali (1997)
Roshini	Sishya (1997)
Soundarya	Arunachalam (1997); Kadhala Kadhala (1998); Padayappa (1999); Thavasi (2001)
Kausalya	Nerukku Ner (1997); Sandhitha Velai (2000)
Maheswari	Nesam (1997)
Keerthi Reddy	Nandhini (1997); Jolly (1998); Ninaivirukkum Varai (1999)
Roja	Pasamulla Pandiyare (1997); Azhagarsamy (1999)
Ravali	Abhimanyu (1997)
Simran	VIP (1997); Natpukkaga (1998); Kannedhirey Thondrinal (1998); Shanmuga Pandian (1999; Tamil Dubbed); Thullatha Manamum Thullum (1999); Vaalee (Telugu dubbed version)(1999); Kanave Kalaiyadhe (1999); Jodi (1999); Kannupada Poguthaiya (1999); Time (1999); Kalisundam Raa (2000); Unnai Kodu Ennai Tharuven (2000); Yuvaraju (2000); Priyamanavale (2000); Parthen Rasithen (2000); Mrugaraju (2001); Narasimha Naidu (2001); Prematho Raa (2001); Bava Nachadu (2001); Paravasam (Telugu dubbed Version)(2001); Pammal K. Sambandam (2002); 12B (2001); Thamizh (2002); Panchatantram (Telugu dubbed Version )(2002); Pithamagan (2003) (Cameo); Udhaya (2004); New (2004); Kichaa Vayasu 16 (2005); Seval (2008); John Appa Rao 40 plus (2008); Ainthaam Padai (2009); Trisha Illana Nayanthara (2015); Petta (2019); Mahaan (2022); Tourist Family (2025)
Aishwarya Rai	Jeans (1998); Taalam (1999; Tamil dubbed version); Priyuralu Pilichindi (2000; Telugu dubbed version); Josh (2000; Tamil dubbed version); Enthiran (2010); 2.0 (2018; Voice only)
Tabu	Thayin Manikodi (1998)
Juhi Chawla	Harikrishnans (1998; Tamil dubbed version)
Rachna Banerjee	Muradan (1998)
Maanu	Kadhal Mannan (1998)
Monica Nerukkar	Golmaal (1998)
Pooja Kumar	Magic Magic 3D (2003)
Lakshmi	Thalaimurai (1998)
Jyothika	Poovellam Kettuppar (1999); Mugavaree (2000); Kushi (2000); Rhythm (2000); Uyirile Kalantathu (2000); Thenali (2000); Snegithiye (2000); Little John (2001); Dum Dum Dum (2001); Star (2001); Poovellam Un Vaasam (2001); 12B (2001); Raja (2002); Dhool (2003); Priyamana Tozhi (2003); Three Roses (2003); Arul (2004); Perazhagan (2004, for the character of Priya); Manmadhan (2004); Mass (2004); Kidnap (2005) (Telugu dubbed version); Chandramukhi (2005, For the character of Ganga); Saravana (2006); Sillunu Oru Kaadhal (2006); Shock (2006); Mozhi (2007) (Mind Voice only); 36 Vayadhinile (2015); Vasundhara (2018) (Telugu dubbed version); Jhansi (2018) (Telugu dubbed version)
Laila	Rojavanam (1999); Mudhalvan (1999); Parthen Rasithen (2000); Dheena (2001); Alli Thandha Vaanam (2001); Nandhaa (2001); Unnai Ninaithu (2002); Mounam Pesiyadhe (2002); Pithamagan (2003); Gambeeram (2004); Ullam Ketkume (2005); Kanda Naal Mudhal (2005); Paramasivan (2006); Sardar (2022); The Greatest of All Time (2024)
Ragasudha	Kadhalar Dhinam (1999); Angala Parameshwari (2001; Tamil dubbed version)
Swathi	Annan (1999)
Isha Koppikar	Kaadhal Kavithai (1998) En Swasa Kaatre (1999); Nenjinile (1999); Narasimha (2001); Ayalaan (2024)
Sonali Bendre	Premikula Roju (Telugu dubbed version of Kadhalar Dhinam) (1999); Kannodu Kanbathellam (1999); Indran (2002; Tamil dubbed)
Ruchita Prasad	Kannodu Kanbathellam (1999)
Malavika	Anantha Poongatre (1999); Vetri Kodi Kattu (2000)
Preeti Jhangiani	Hello (1999)
Preity Zinta	Kadhal Vennila (1999; Tamil dubbed)
Preetha Vijayakumar	Narasimha (1999; Telugu dubbed)
Riya Sen	Taj Mahal (1999); Nenu Meeku Telusa? (2008)
Sushva	Maanaseega Kadhal (1999)
Monica Castelino	Minsara Kanna (1999)
Abitha	Sethu (1999)
Renu Desai	Badri (2000); James Pandu (2000)
Richa Pallod	Nuvve Kavali (2000); Chirujallu (2001); Prematho Raa (2001); Shahjahan (2001)
Rekha Vedavyas	Anandam (2001); Janaki Weds Sriram (2003)
Vaijayanthi	Vanna Thamizh Pattu (2000)
Prema	Relax (2000; Tamil dubbed)
Uma	Veeranadai (2000); Soori (2003)
Abhirami	Vaanavil (2000)
Shilpa Shetty	Azad (2000)
Sneha	Ennavalle (2000); April Maadhathil (2002); Vaseegara (2003); Parthiban Kanavu (2003); Vasool Raja MBBS (2004); Bose (2004); Autograph (2004); Jana (2004); Aayudham (2005); Pallikoodam (2007); Theeradha Vilayattu Pillai (2010); Goa (2010); The Greatest of All Time (2024) Mookuthi Amman 2 (2026) (Cameo)
Anjala Zaveri	Devi Putrudu (2001); Ullam Kollai Poguthey (2001)
Meena	Naam Iruvar Namakku Iruvar (1998); Rishi (2001)
Suvalakshmi	Aandan Adimai (2001); Vani Mahal (2003)
Bhumika	Kushi (2001); Roja Koottam (2002); Vasu (2002); Okkadu (2003); Missamma (2003); Samba (2004); Naa Autograph (2004); Satyabhama (2007); Swagatam (2008); Mallepuvvu (2008); Middle Class Abbayi (2017); Kalavaadiya Pozhuthugal (2017); Savyasachi (2018); U Turn (2018); Paagal (2021)
Aarthi Agarwal	Nuvvu Naaku Nachav (2001); Nuvvu Leka Nenu Lenu (2002); Allari Ramudu (2002); Nee Sneham (2002); Bobby (2002); Veede (2003); Vasantham (2003); Palnati Brahmanayudu (2003); Nenunnanu (2004); Adavi Ramudu (2004); Sankranthi (2005); Bambara Kannaley (2005); Gorintaku (2008)
Reemma Sen	Cheli (2001; Telugu dubbed); Manasantha Nuvve (2001); Adrustam (2002); Bagavathi (2002); Enakku 20 Unakku 18 / Nee Manasu Naaku Telusu (2003); Prema Chadarangam (2004; Telugu dubbed); Giri (2004)
Vasundhara Das	Citizen (2001)
Kaveri	Samudhiram (2001); Seshu (2002); Pellamtho Panenti (2003); Kannadi Pookal (2005)
Gajala	Naalo Unna Prema (2001); Kalusukovalani (2002); University (2002); Ezhumalai (2002); Raam (2005)
Radhika Chaudhari	Paravasam (2001; Telugu dubbed)
Kareena Kapoor	Samrat Asoka (2001; Tamil dubbed version); Ra.One (2011; Tamil dubbed)
Shriya Saran	Ishtam (2001); Santosham (2002); Enakku 20 Unakku 18/Nee Manasu Naaku Telusu (2003); Tagore (2003); Ela Cheppanu (2003); Arjun (2004); Mazhai (2005); Thiruvilayadal Arambam (2006); Arasu (2007); Sivaji: The Boss (2007) (Telugu dubbed version); Thoranai (2009); Kanthaswamy (2009) (Telugu dubbed version); Jaggubhai (2010); Rowthiram (2011); Chandra (2014); Thozha (2016); Naragasooran (2021)
Trisha	Mounam Pesiyadhe (2002); Enakku 20 Unakku 18 (2003); Manasellam (2003) Alai (film) (2003) Saamy (2003); Varsham (2004); Yuva (2004) (Telugu dubbed); Allari Bullodu (2005) Thirupaachi (2005); Nuvvostanante Nenoddantana (2005); Athadu (2005) Aathi (2006); Bangaram (2006); Unnakum Ennakum (2006); Pournami (2006); Sainikudu (2006); Kireedam (2007); Bujjigadu (2008); Bheemaa (2008); Kuruvi (2008); King (2008); Aakasamantha (2009); Sankham (2009); Namo Venkatesa (2010); Bodyguard (2012); Dammu (2012); Vetadu-Ventadu (2013) (Telugu dubbed); Yentha Vaadu Gannie (2015; Telugu dubbed); Lion (2015); Veerabhadrudu (2026; Telugu dubbed)
Gayatri Jayaraman	Manadhai Thirudivittai (2001); Sri (2002)
Monal	Badri (2001); Samudhiram (2001); Paarvai Ondre Podhume (2001)
Rinke Khanna	Majunu (2001)
Lisa Ray	Takkari Donga (2002)
Nandita Das	Azhagi (2002); Vishwa Thulasi (2004)
Charmy Kaur	Kadhal Azhivathillai (2002); Aahaa Ethanai Azhagu (2003); Kadhal Kisu Kisu (2003)
Rathi	Solla Marandha Kadhai (2002)
Gayathri Raguram	Charlie Chaplin (2002); Style (2002)
Anita Hassanandani	Sreeram (2002); Samurai (2002); Sukran (2005)
Priyanka Trivedi	Raja (2002); Kadhal Sadugudu (2003)
Samyuktha Varma	Thenkasi Pattanam (2002)
Priya Gill	Red (2002)
Kanishka Sodhi	Jjunction (2002)
Sandhya	Youth (2002)
Kaniha	Five Star (2002)
Manya	Naina (2002)
Ankitha	Lahiri Lahiri Lahirilo (2002); Manasu Maata Vinadhu (2005); London (2005); Thaka Thimi Tha (2005)
Anu Prabhakar	Arputham (2002)
Namitha	Sontham (2002); Engal Anna (2004); Aai (2004); Maha Nadigan (2004); Chanakya (2005); Kovai Brothers (2006)
Sherin	Jaya (2002); Whistle (2003)
Ashima Bhalla	Ramanaa (2002); Cheppave Chirugali (2004)
Bhavna Pani	Ninu Choodaka Nenundalenu (2002)
Nikita Thukral	Hai (2002); Kurumbu(2003)
Meera Jasmine	Bala (2002); Puthiya Geethai (2003); Anjaneya (2003); Joot (2003); Ammayi Bagundi (2004); Bhadra (2005); Sandakozhi (2005); Mercury Pookal (2006); Maharadhi (2007); Nepali (2008); Maa Ayana Chanti Pilladu (2008)
Asin	Amma Nanna O Tamila Ammayi (2003); Sivamani (2003); Ghajini (2005; dubbed Version); Majaa (2005; Telugu dubbed version & song bit); Annavaram (2006)
Shilpa Anand	Vishnu (2003)
Shamita Shetty	Pilisthe Palukutha (2003)
Tulip Joshi	Villain (2003)
Daisy Bopanna	Indru Mudhal (2003)
Sharmilee	Aasai Aasaiyai (2003); Anbe Anbe (2003); Taarak (2003)
Sadha	Jayam (2003); Aethirree (2004); Priyasakhi (2005); Anniyan (2005) (Telugu dubbed version); Eli (2015)
Sridevi Vijaykumar	Ninne Ishtapaddanu (2003); Thithikudhe (2003); Nireekshana (2005)
Meera Vasudevan	Unnai Charanadaindhen (2003)
Rakshita	Dum (2003); Madurey (2004)
Kiran Rathod	Parasuram (2003); Thennavan (2003); Anbe Sivam (2003) (Telugu dubbed version); Andaru Dongale Dorikite (2004)
Neha Mehta	Dham (2003)
Pooja Umashankar	Attahasam (2004)
Anuradha Mehta	Arya (2004); Nuvvante Naakishtam (2005)
Namrata Shirodkar	Anji (2004)
Divya Spandana	Kuthu (2004)
Divya Khosla Kumar	Love Today (2004)
Laya	Gajendra (2004); Chanakya (2005)
Chaya Singh	No (2004 Telugu Movie) (2004)
Ambili Devi	Vishwa Thulasi (2004)
Madhumitha	Englishkaran (2005); Naalai (2006)
Nandana	Kalinga (2005)
Gopika	Thotti Jaya (2005); Em Magan (2006)
Renuka Menon	February 14 (2005); Daas (2005); Kalabha Kadhalan (2006)
Nila	Anbe Aaruyire (2005); Jambhavan (2006); Bangaram (2006); Marudhamalai (film) (2007); Killadi (2015)
Sameera Reddy	Narasimhudu (2005); Jai Chiranjeeva (2005)
Rimi Sen	Andarivaadu (2005)
Neha Oberoi	Balu (2005)
Preethi Arora	Vayiravan (2005)
Pranathi	Gurudeva (2005); Kaatrullavarai (2005)
Roma Asrani	Mr. Errababu (2005); Kadhale En Kadhale (2006)
Sonia Agarwal	Oru Kalluriyin Kathai (2005); Oru Naal Oru Kanavu (2005)
Anushka Shetty	Super (2005); Nagavalli (2010); Saguni (2012); Alex Pandian (2013); Lingaa (2014) (Telugu Dubbed version); Oopiri/Thozha (2016)
Mamta Mohandas	Sivappathigaram (2006)
Ileana	Devadasu (2006); Kedi (2006); Pokiri (2006); Khatarnak (2006); Bhale Dongalu (2008); Shakti (2011); Snehithudu (2012) (Telugu Dubbed Version)
Bhavana	Chithiram Pesuthadi (2006); Kizhakku Kadarkarai Salai (2006); Deepavali (2007); Vaazhthugal (2008); Ontari (2008)
Nithya Das	Manathodu Mazhaikalam (2006)
Poonam Kaur	Nenjirukkum Varai (2006); 6 (2013)
Poonam Bajwa	Premante Inte (2006); Veduka (2007)
Sheela	Ilavattam (2006); Hello Premistara (2007)
Debina Bonnerjee	Perarasu (2006)
Mallika Kapoor	Azhagai Irukkirai Bayamai Irukkirathu (2006); Vathiyar (2006); Solla Solla Inikkum (2009)
Genelia D'Souza	Bommarillu (2006); Chennai Kadhal (2006); Dhee (2007); Heart Attack (2007); Santosh Subramaniam (2008); Ready (2008); King (2008); Satya in Love (2008; Kannada movie); Katha (2009); Sasirekha Parinayam (2009); Uthamaputhiran (2010); Orange (2010); Ramcharan (2010; Orange Tamil Dubbed version); Velayudham (2011); Naa Ishtam (2012) Alias Rukumini (2013)
Nayanthara	E (2006); Vallavan (2006); Aegan (2008); Sathyam (2008); Yaaradi Nee Mohini (2008); Villu (2009); Super (2010) (Telugu Dubbed Version); Boss Engira Bhaskaran (2010); Aarambam (2013); Idhu Kathirvelan Kadhal (2014); Nannbenda (2015); Rakshasudu (2015) (Telugu dubbed version); Thirunaal (2016); Vasuki (2016) (Telugu Dubbed Version); Karthavyam (2017) (Telugu Dubbed Version); Dora (2017) (Telugu Dubbed Version); Whistle (2019) (Telugu Dubbed Version); Darbar (2020) (Telugu Dubbed Version); Maya Nizhal/Needa (2021) (Tamil and Telugu Dubbed Versions)
Sunitha Varma	Iruvar Mattum (2006)
Vedhika	Muni (2007); Malai Malai (2009)
Ashita	Ninaithu Ninaithu Parthen (2007)
Shruti Sharma	Muruga (2007)
Samvrutha Sunil	Evadaithe Nakenti (2007)
Bhanu	Bharani (2007) (Telugu Dubbed Version)
Nargis Bagheri	Ninaithaley (2007)
Gurleen Chopra	Thullal (2007)
Karishma Kotak	Shankar Dada Zindabad (2007)
Vishakha Singh	Pidichirukku (2008); Kanna Laddu Thinna Aasaiya (2013)
Ramya Raj	Sandai (2008)
Gowri Munjal	Singakutty (2008)
Vidisha	Kathavarayan (2008)
Lakshmi Rai	Annan Thambi (2008)
Kavya Madhavan	Sadhu Miranda (2008)
Ishita Sharma	Sakkarakatti (2008)
Siya Gautam	Neninthe (2008)
Shweta Basu Prasad	Kotha Bangaru Lokam (2008); Kasko (2009); Kalavar King (2010); Raa Raa (2011 film) (2011); Chandhamama (2013)
Anuya Bhagwat	Siva Manasula Sakthi (2009); Naan (2012)
Tamannaah	Konchem Ishtam Konchem Kashtam (2009); Veedokkade (2009) (Telugu dubbed version); Paiyaa (2010); Thillalangadi (2010); Siruthai (2011); Venghai (2011); Veeram (2014); Vasuvum Saravananum Onna Padichavanga (2015)
Kajal Aggarwal	Ganesh (2009); Arya 2 (2009); Businessman (2012); Sarocharu (2012); Baadshah (2013); Temper (2015); Vivegam (2017); Comali (2019) (Telugu dubbed version); Bhagavanth Kesari (2023)
Neetu Chandra	13B-Padamoodu (2009) (Telugu dubbed version)
Sneha Ullal	Current (2009); Action 3D (2013)
Surveen Chawla	Raju Maharaju (2009)
Farzana	1977 (2009)
Meenakshi	Rajadhi Raja (2009)
Karthika Nair	Josh (2009); Ko (2011) (Telugu Dubbed Version)
Kangana Ranaut	Ek Niranjan (2009); Chandramukhi 2 (2023)
Manjari Fadnis	Siddu From Sikakulam (2009)
Shamili	Oye! (2009); Veera Sivaji (2017)
Sarah Jane Dias	Theeradha Vilaiyattu Pillai (2010); Panjaa (2011)
Kamalinee Mukherjee	Kutrappirivu (2010)
Taapsee Pannu	Jhummandi Naadam (2010); Veera (2011); Kanchana 2 (2015; Tamil/Telugu dubbed)
Dhansika	Maanja Velu (2010); Kabali (2016; Hindi dubbed)
Hariprriya	Kanagavel Kaaka (2010); Vallakottai (2010)
Shruti Marathe	Guru Sishyan (2010)
Hansika Motwani	Mappillai (2011); Engeyum Kadhal (2011); Oru Kal Oru Kannadi (2012); Biriyani (2013); Settai (2013); Singam 2 (2013); Theeya Velai Seiyyanum Kumaru (2013); Power (2014); Aranmanai (2014); Aambala (2015); Vaalu (2015); Romeo Juliet (2015); Uyire Uyire (2016); Pokkiri Raja (2016); Bogan (2017); Gulaebaghavali (2018); Maha (2022); Partner (2023); Guardian (2024)
Amala Paul	Deiva Thirumagal (2011); Vettai (2012); Love Failure (2012); Velaiyilla Pattathari (2014); Pasanga 2 (2015); Velaiilla Pattadhari 2 (2017)
Nushrat Bharucha	Taj Mahal (2010)
Shraddha	Unakkaga En Kadhal (2010)
Deeksha Seth	Mirapakaay (2011); Nippu (2012)
Nakshatra	Marudhavelu (2011)
Meghana Raj	Uyarthiru 420 (2011)
Nisha Agarwal	Solo (2011); Sukumarudu (2013)
Pranitha Subhash	Saguni (2012)
Amy Jackson	Thaandavam (2012) Gethu (2016)
Pooja Hegde	Mugamoodi (2012)
Gauthami Nair	Diamond Necklace (2012)
Jiya Shankar	Entha Andanga Unnave (2013); Kanavu Variyam (2017)
Sija Rose	Masani (2013)
Mrudhula Basker	Vallinam (2014)
Remya Nambeesan	Damaal Dumeel (2014)
Aksha Pardasany	Salim (2014)
Deepika Padukone	Kochadaiiyaan (2014); Bajirao Mastani (2015; Tamil dubbed); Padmaavat (2018; Tamil dubbed)
Erica Fernandes	Galipatam (2014)
Raashii Khanna	Jil (2014); Bengal Tiger (2015); Supreme (2016); Oxygen (2017)
Regina Cassandra	Ra Ra... Krishnayya (2014); Rajathandhiram (2015); Soukhyam (2015)
Malavika Nair	Yevade Subramanyam (2015)
Sulagna Panigrahi	Isai (2015)
Kanika Tiwari	Aavi Kumar (2015)
Nandini Rai	Mosagallaku Mosagadu (2015)
Catherine Tresa	Kathakali (2016); Aruvam (2019)
Lavanya Tripathi	Srirastu Subhamastu (2016)
Amanda Rosario	Saagasam (2016)
Tejaswi Madivada	Natpadhigaram 79 (2016)
Abhinaya	Nisabdham (2017); Vizhithiru (2017)
Tanya Ravichandran	Karuppan (2017)
Amala Rose Kurian	Oru Kanavu Pola (2017)
Parvatii Nair	Koditta Idangalai Nirappuga (2017)
Kriti Kharbanda	Bruce Lee (2017)
Nikki Galrani	Motta Shiva Ketta Shiva (2017); Kee (2019)
Ritika Singh	Shivalinga (2017)
Ashrita Shetty	Indrajith (2017)
Sayyeshaa	Vanamagan (2017); Ghajinikanth (2018)
Katrina Kaif	Thugs of Hindostan (2018; Tamil dubbed)
Anandhi	Mannar Vagaiyara (2018)
Aishwarya Rajesh	Lakshmi (2018) (Telugu dubbed version)
Mia Rai Leone	Evanukku Engeyo Matcham Irukku (2018)
Samyuktha Hegde	Comali (2019)
Shraddha Srinath	Nerkonda Paarvai (2019)
Aditi Rao Hydari	Psycho (2020)
Rittika Sen	Dagaalty (2020); Naanga Romba Busy (2020)
Ananya	Pulivaal (2014) God Father (2020)
Shirin Kanchwala	Walter (2020)
Sangeetha	Kutty Story (2021)
Ivana	Love Today (2022)
Shiva Parvathy	Solamante Theneechakal (2022)
Aathmika	Kaatteri (2022)
Ilambarathi and Bommi (Kuttappa)	Koogle Kuttappa (2022)
Rakul Preet Singh	Boo (2023; Tamil version) Ayalaan (2024)
Kashmira Pardeshi	PT Sir (2024)
Madonna Sebastian	Junga (2018) Jolly O Gymkana (2024)
Kayadu Lohar	Dragon (2025)
Bhagyashri Borse	Kaantha (2025)
Krithi Shetty	Love Insurance Kompany (2026; Telugu Dubbed Version)
Jiya Shankar	Kadhal Reset Repeat (2026)

== Accolades ==
Year	Artist & Film	Award	References
2000	Simran for Priyamanavale	Tamil Nadu State Film Award for Best Female Dubbing Artist	
2001	Aarthi Agarwal for Nuvvu Naaku Nachav	Nandi Award for Best Female Dubbing Artist	
2003	Bhumika Chawla for Missamma	Nandi Award for Best Female Dubbing Artist	
2005	Jyothika for Chandramukhi	Tamil Nadu State Film Award for Best Female Dubbing Artist	
2006	Genelia D'Souza for Bommarillu	Nandi Award for Best Female Dubbing Artist	
2008	Genelia D'Souza for Santosh Subramaniam	Tamil Nadu State Film Award for Best Female Dubbing Artist	
2010	Nayanthara for Boss Engira Bhaskaran	Tamil Nadu State Film Award for Best Female Dubbing Artist	
