= List of awards and nominations received by Simran =

Simran awards and nominations
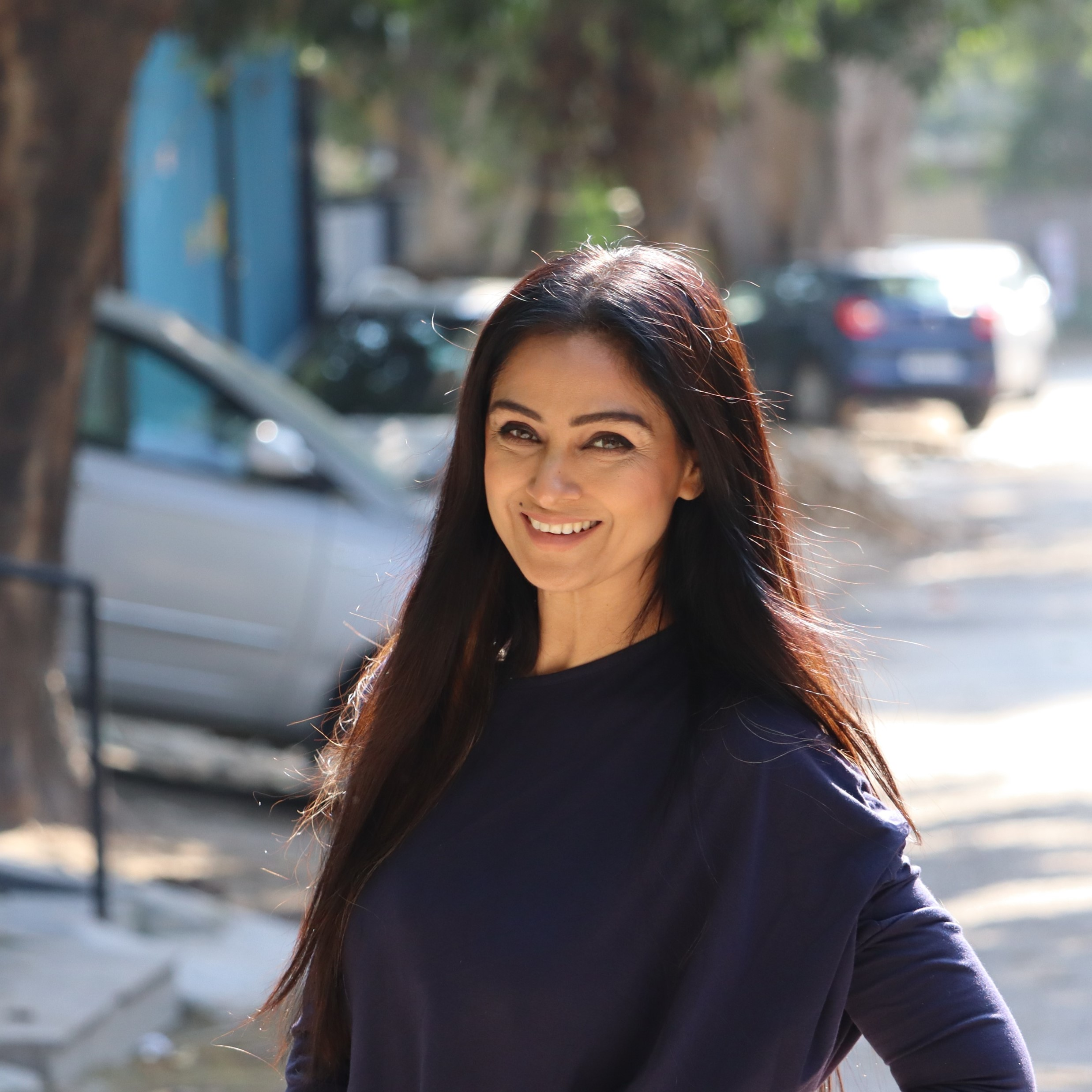
- Simran in 2023
Awards and nominations
Award	Wins	Nominations
Cinema Express Awards	2	2
Dinakaran Cinema Awards	2	2
Filmfare Awards South	3	2
ITFA	1	1
Kalaimamani	1	1
Tamil Nadu State Film Awards	1	1
Vijay Awards	1	1
Other Awards	4	3

Totals (Note: Certain award groups do not simply award one winner. They acknowledge several different recipients, have runners-up, and have third place. Since this is a specific recognition and is different from losing an award, runner-up mentions are considered wins in this award tally. For simplification and to avoid errors, each award in this list has been presumed to have had a prior nomination.)
- Wins: 16

Simran is an Indian actress who has starred in several Indian films. who has predominantly appeared in Tamil, Telugu and a few Malayalam films. She debuted in Bollywood and acted in Hindi films, before starring in her first Tamil film V.I.P and her first Telugu film Abbai Gari Pelli in 1997. Having a string of successes in her early career, in 1999, Simran received critical praise for playing a blind woman in Thullatha Manamum Thullum. However the turning point of her career came with the success of Vaalee (1999) which made Simran the most successful actress in the industry. At the peak of her career she agreed to play the role of an antagonist in Parthen Rasithen (2000) and in Priyamaanavale (2000) as a woman living in agony caused by a premarital agreement. Both went on to become commercial and critical successes. She received her first Filmfare Award for Best Tamil Actress for Kannathil Muthamittal (2002), as the mother of an adopted 9-year-old daughter. Other than romantic dramas, Simran had also appeared in two blockbuster comedy films alongside Kamal Haasan; Pammal K. Sambandam and Panchathantiram, both released in 2002. In Telugu, Simran starred in a series of commercially successful films, Samarasimha Reddy (1999), Kalisundam Raa (2000) and Narasimha Naidu (2001). With the success of the 2004 sci fi film New, Simran left the film industry following her marriage with her childhood family friend Deepak Bagga. In 2008 she made a comeback to Tamil cinema with Vaaranam Aayiram, where she played the role of a mother and a wife to the characters played by Suriya and won the Filmfare Award for Best Supporting Actress.

== Cinema Express Awards ==
The Cinema Express Awards are presented annually by Indian Express Group to honour artistic excellence of professionals in the south Indian film industry which comprises Tamil, Telugu, Kannada and Malayalam film industries.

Year	Award	Nominated work	Role	Result	Ref.
1999	Best Tamil Actress in Leading Role	Vaalee	Priya	Won	
2002	Best Tamil Actress in Leading Role	Kannathil Muthamittal	Indra Thiruchelvan	Won	

== Filmfare Awards South ==
The Filmfare Awards South is the South Indian segment of the annual Filmfare Awards, presented by The Times Group to honour both artistic and technical excellence of professionals in the South Indian film industry. The awards are separately given for Kannada, Tamil, Telugu and Malayalam films.

Year	Award	Nominated work	Language	Role	Result	Ref.
1997	Best Female Debut	Nerrukku Ner; Once More; V.I.P.	Tamil	Asha; Kavitha; Priya	Won	
2001	Best Actress	Narasimha Naidu	Telugu	Sravani	Nominated	
2002	Best Actress	Kannathil Muthamittal	Tamil	Indra Thiruchelvan	Won	
2008	Best Supporting Actress	Vaaranam Aayiram	Tamil	Malini Krishnan	Won	
2024	Best Actress	Andhagan	Tamil	Simi	Nominated	

== SIIMA Awards ==
Year	Award	Nominated work	Role	Result	Ref.
2023	Best Supporting Actress	Rocketry: The Nambi Effect	Meena Narayanan	Nominated	
2026	Best Actress	Tourist Family	Vasanthi	Won	

== Filmfare Awards ==
The Filmfare Awards are annual awards that honour artistic and technical excellence in the Hindi-language film industry of India.

Year	Award	Nominated work	Role	Result	Ref.
2023	Best Supporting Actress	Rocketry: The Nambi Effect	Meena Narayanan	Nominated	

== Filmfare OTT Awards ==
The Filmfare OTT Awards are annual awards that honour artistic and technical excellence in original programming on over-the-top streaming media in Hindi-language.

Year	Award	Nominated work	Role	Result	Ref.
2023	Best Supporting Actress (Web Original Film)	Gulmohar	Indira "Indu" Batra	Nominated	

== International Tamil Film Awards ==
The ITFA is an awards ceremony that honours excellence in Tamil language films around the world since 2003.

Year	Award	Nominated work	Role	Result	Ref.
2002	Best Actress in Leading Role	Kannathil Muthamittal	Indra Thiruchelvan	Won	

== Kalaimamani Award ==
The Kalaimamani is an award in Tamil Nadu state, India. These awards are given by the Tamil Nadu Iyal Isai Nataka Manram (literature, music and theatre) for excellence in the field of art and literature.

Year	Award	Nominated work	Ref.
2003	Contribution to Tamil film industry	Won	

== Tamil Nadu State Film Awards ==
The Tamil Nadu State Film Awards are the most notable film awards given for Tamil films in India. They are given annually to honour the best talents and provide encouragement and incentive to the South Indian film industry by the Government of Tamil Nadu.

Year	Award	Nominated work	Role	Result	Ref.
1999	Best Actress in Leading Role	Thullatha Manamum Thullum	Rukmani	Won	

== Vijay Awards ==
The Vijay Awards are presented by the Tamil television channel STAR Vijay to honour excellence in Tamil cinema.

Year	Award	Nominated work	Role	Result	Ref.
2008	Best Actress in a Supporting Role	Vaaranam Aayiram	Malini Krishnan	Won	

== Ananda Vikatan Cinema Awards ==
The Ananda Vikatan Cinema Awards are presented by the Tamil television channel STAR Vijay to honour excellence in Tamil cinema.

Year	Award	Nominated work	Role	Result	Ref.
2024	Best Villain – Female	Andhagan	Simi	Won	

== See also ==
- Simran
- Simran filmography
