= Anbe Aaruyire (2005 film) =

2005 film directed by S. J. Suryah

- DVD cover
- Directed by: S. J. Suryah
- Written by: S. J. Suryah
- Produced by: S. J. Suryah
- Starring: S. J. Suryah; Nila
- Cinematography: Venu
- Edited by: Anthony
- Music by: A. R. Rahman
- Production company: Annai Mary Madha Creations
- Release date: 9 September 2005
- Running time: 169 minutes
- Country: India
- Language: Tamil

Anbe Aaruyire (transl. Darling), also known as Aa Aah, is a 2005 Indian Tamil-language romantic comedy film directed by S. J. Suryah. The film stars him and debutant Nila, along with Urvashi, Santhana Bharathi and Santhanam. The score and soundtrack were composed by A. R. Rahman. It was released on 9 September 2005.

== Plot ==
Siva (S. J. Surya) is an investigative scribe who shares a live-in relationship with rich and bratty Madhu (Nila). They have hot-headed run-ins and even hotter patch-ups. Things come to a head when Madhu starts a restaurant with a brother of her friend. Nosy and envious Siva cannot take it, and this causes a split between the duo. Fun starts as the fantasy element appears in the form of their apparitional alter egos. Eventually they come together, but there is plenty of over-the-top entertainment aimed at a post-teen youth audience. Anbe Aaruyire features the memories of each other in a human lookalike appearances. These memories remind them of their good times and the inner love for each other, which help in their reunion.

== Cast ==
- S. J. Suryah as Siva and memory
- Nila (voice: Savitha) as Madhu and memory
- Santhanam as Jackie
- Urvashi as Doctor
- Santhana Bharathi as College Chairman
- Shyam Ganesh as Siva's friend
- M. N. Nambiar as Father of Memories
- Pandu as Police Inspector
- Shyam as Shayam, Siva's friend
- Ammu as Shyam's wife
- Aparna as Nila's friend
- Krishna Viswanathan as Kishore
- Nellai Siva as Traffic Police Officer
- Mayilsamy
- Ravi Mariya as Doctor (special appearance)

== Production ==
S. J. Suryah announced a film titled Isai in 2004 shortly after the release of New, when he revealed that A. R. Rahman would also collaborate for two further ventures titled Anbulla Nanbane and Aezhumazhai vs Chitra. While Isai was postponed, Anbulla Nanbane developed under the title Best Friend, before the title Anbe Aaruyire (2005) was finalised, from the 1975 film. The film was initially titled BF, an initialism of Best Friend, but Suryah was met with a protest from Tamil Protection Movement led by PMK leader Ramadoss and Dalit Panthers of India leader Thol. Thirumavalavan to change the title. After three months of its launch, Suryah changed the name from BF to Ah Aah, the first two letters in the Tamil alphabet. Featuring himself in the lead role again, he signed up newcomer Meera Chopra for the film and rechristened her under the stage name Nila, after initially considering the stage name of Junior Simran, owing to her resemblance to Simran. He revealed that he was inspired to make the film to convey that young lovers must give each other space and wanted to showcase that attitudes towards relationships by the Indian youth was changing from the previous decade. He also called the film a "sequel to Kushi (2000)", revealing that the film's lead actors would have similar ego clashes.

== Music ==
The soundtrack features six songs composed by A. R. Rahman and lyrics penned by Vaalee. The song "Anbe Aaruyire" was initially composed in 2004 for the then shelved film Jaggubhai, and Suryah requested Rahman if the song could be used in his film instead.

Song	Artist(s)
"Anbe Aaruyire" ("Aararai Kodi")	A. R. Rahman
"Mayiliragae"	Naresh Iyer
"Mayiliragae"	Madhushree
"Varugiraai"	Hariharan
"Varugiraai"	K. S. Chithra
"Thigu Thigu"	Sadhana Sargam
"Thigu Thigu"	Blaaze
"Thazhuvudu"	S. P. Balasubrahmanyam
"Thazhuvudu"	Shreya Ghoshal
"Maram Kothiye"	Shankar Mahadevan,
"Maram Kothiye"	Pop Shalini
"Maram Kothiye"	Vasundhara Das
"Maram Kothiye"	Blaaze

== Release and reception ==
The film faced hurdles prior to release with the censor board insisting on several cuts and Suryah's ongoing legal tussles meant the film was delayed. It was given a U/A certificate by the board after 14 cuts. The film released on 9 September 2005. Sify labelled it as "adult entertainment" though added he "tries hard to bring his character Shiva to life but has to go miles as far as dialogue delivery and voice modulation goes but has improved leaps and bound on the dancing front". Ambi Narayanan of Kalki said that, with such a beautiful plot Suryah should have hit hundred by making everyone go in awe but by making squirm in theatre with uninteresting screenplay he scores only thirty five out of hundred tens. The film became Suryah's fourth consecutive commercial success in Tamil films, with Suryah adamant on thanking his crew for helping get through the controversies, labelling that "team effort" helped them overcome the problems.
