= Tamil Nadu State Film Award for Best Female Dubbing Artist =

Indian film award

The Tamil Nadu State Film Award for Best Female Dubbing Artist is given by the state government as part of its annual Tamil Nadu State Film Awards for Tamil (Kollywood) films.

== Superlatives ==
Most Awards

1. Savitha Reddy - 4

== The list ==
Here is a list of the award winners and the films for which they won.

Year	Dubbing Artist	Film	Dubbing for	Position of Dubbed Character
2015	R. Uma Maheshwari	Irudhi Suttru	Ritika Singh	Female lead
2014	Meena Lochani	Nimirndhu Nil	Amala Paul	Female lead
2013	Meena Lochani	Pandiya Naadu	Lakshmi Menon	Female lead
2012	Divya	Paradesi	Vedhicka	One of the female leads
2011	Priyanka	Yuddham Sei	Dipa Shah	Character role
2010	Savitha Reddy	Boss Engira Bhaskaran	Nayanthara	Female lead
2009	Mahalakshmi	Eeram & Pasanga	Sindhu Menon & Vega Tamotia	Female lead
2008	Savitha Reddy	Santosh Subramaniam	Genelia D'Souza	Female lead
2007	Mahalakshmi	Mirugam	Padmapriya Janakiraman	Female lead
2006	Jayageetha	Thimiru	Sriya Reddy	Main female antagonist character
2005	Savitha Reddy	Chandramukhi	Jyothika	Female lead
2002	Anuradha.K.R	Roja Kootam	Rekha	Supporting role
2001	Sreeja Ravi	Dhill	Laila	Female lead
2000	Savitha Reddy	Priyamaanavale	Simran	Female lead

== See also ==
- Tamil cinema
- Cinema of India
