= S. J. Suryah =

Indian actor and film director

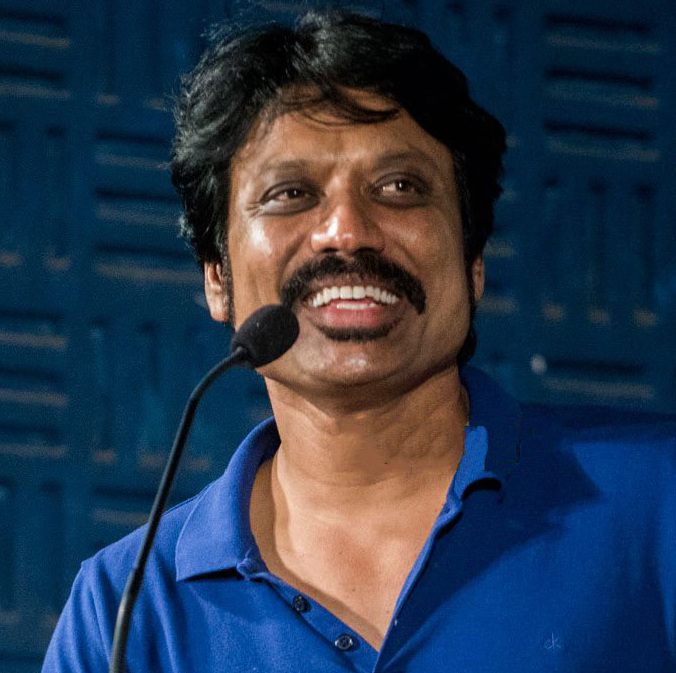
- S. J. Suryah in 2016
- Born: Samanasapandian Justin Selvaraj; 20 July 1968 (age 58); Vasudevanallur, Tenkasi district, Tamil Nadu, India
- Other name: Nadippu Arakkan
- Education: Loyola College, Chennai
- Occupations: Actor; Lyricist; Film director; Film producer; Screenwriter; Playback singer; Composer; Narrator; Philanthropist
- Years active: 1988–present

Samanasapandian Justin Selvaraj (born 20 July 1968), known by his stage name S. J. Suryah, is an Indian actor, film director, producer, playback singer, writer and philanthropist who predominantly works in Tamil cinema. He sought to become an actor but started out directing, assisting Vasanth and Sabapathy.

Suryah made his directorial debut with Vaalee in 1999 whose success catapulted him to stardom. His other notable films include Kushi (2000), New (2004), Anbe Aaruyire (2005) and Isai (2015). He made his acting debut with New and went on to act in films like Kalvanin Kadhali (2006), Thirumagan (2007), Vyabari (2007) and appeared as the antagonist in Spyder (2017), Mersal (2017), Maanaadu (2021), Don (2022), Mark Antony (2023), Indian 2 (2024), Raayan (2024), Saripodhaa Sanivaaram (2024), Game Changer (2025), Veera Dheera Sooran (2025),Love Insurance Kompany (2026), Sardar 2 (2026) and Jailer 2 (2026) and as the protagonist in Kadamaiyai Sei (2022) and Jigarthanda DoubleX (2023).

== Early life ==
S.J. Suryah, originally named Selvaraj Justin Pandian, was born on July 20, 1968, into a Tamil family in Vasudevanallur, Tenkasi district. His parents, Sammanasu Pandian and Anandham, raised him alongside his two older siblings: a sister named Selvi and a brother named Victor.

== Film career ==
=== 1988–2003: Early career and success ===
After completing his schooling near his birthplace in Vasudevanallur near Puliangudi in South Tamil Nadu, Suryah moved to Chennai to complete a physics degree at Loyola College. Despite getting an opportunity to pursue further studies at an engineering college in Madurai, he declined the offer and stayed in Chennai, with the hope of finding a breakthrough as an actor in Tamil films. To be financially self-dependent, he began working in hotels and as a steward, before receiving an offer to apprentice under K. Bhagyaraj. He subsequently worked as an assistant director in the teams of Aasai (1995) under Vasanth and Sundara Purushan (1996) under Sabapathy, while also being seen in uncredited appearances as an actor, notably as a cock fighter in Bharathiraja's Kizhakku Cheemayile (1993).

While working in the team of Ullaasam (1997), the film's lead actor Ajith Kumar recognised Suryah from their collaboration in Aasai, and accepted to listen to a script narration. Ajith, impressed with the narration, subsequently helped approach S. S. Chakravarthy to produce the film and the team began work on Vaalee (1999) in late 1997. Keerthi Reddy was announced to be the lead actress before she was replaced by Simran, while Suryah also chose to introduce Jyothika in the film. A thriller film, a reviewer from the Deccan Herald described it as "definitely worth seeing" saying it "has something for all tastes — a pleasant love angle, some suspense, complex psychological nuances, good acting, pleasing songs" while praising Ajith's performance. The reviewer from Indolink.com labelled the film as "a classic in its own right", describing Suryah as "a new young director to the cine field who can make Tamil Cinema be proud once again". The New Indian Express mentioned the film as "outstanding" while mentioning Suryah does a "good job and succeeds". The film's commercial success meant that it provided a breakthrough for both Suryah's and the lead actors' careers.

After watching the première show of Vaalee, producer A. M. Rathnam offered Suryah an opportunity to make another film and thus Kushi, a romantic comedy featuring Vijay and Jyothika materialised. Telling the story of a pair of egoistic lovers with a college backdrop, the film was shot in early 2000 across South India and New Zealand. The film opened to positive reviews from critics in May 2000 and also went on to achieve box office success. Rediff.com gave a positive verdict stating that the movie is a "neat family entertainer", praising the director's story-telling, while Bizhat.com also gave the movie a positive review. The Hindu featured the film as runner-up in their list of top Tamil films in 2000, while Jyothika went on to win the Filmfare Best Actress Award in Tamil for her performance in the film.

The team then approached Pawan Kalyan to star in a Telugu version of the film and after a positive narration session, the actor prioritised the venture over two other films. Bhumika Chawla was added to the cast to play Jyothika's role, while a few changes were inserted to make it fit for the Telugu audiences. Pawan Kalyan had also insisted inserting few extra action sequences for the Telugu version, and despite an initial difference of opinions, Suryah eventually allowed the scenes to be filmed but refused to be at the shoot when they were shot. The film also titled as Kushi (2001), opened to positive reviews and went on to become the most successful Telugu film ever at release in June 2001. A film critic noted Suryah "has come up with another winner this time. There is no story in this film, but it runs with a neat screenplay", adding "he has done an extraordinary job as screenplay writer". He made a third version of the film, Khushi (2003) in Hindi, for producer Boney Kapoor, with Fardeen Khan and Kareena Kapoor starring. In comparison to the other two versions, the film received negative reviews and performed poorly at the box office, with a critic writing "plenty of Suryah's scenes are also somewhat contrived, in the vein of those eighties family pot-boilers... [she] just cannot get effective emoting from his lead actors".

=== 2004–2006: Initial acting career ===
Suryah began pre-production work on a third story titled New in early 2001, which he would also produce. Starring Ajith Kumar and Jyothika, music director Deva had composed ten songs for the film by June 2001. After Ajith Kumar had become busy with other commitments, Suryah decided to enact the lead role himself, revealing he had always wanted to be an actor. Simran signed on to play the leading female character, while Kiran and Devayani were cast in pivotal roles. A simultaneously shot Telugu version titled Naani featuring Mahesh Babu in the lead role, with Amisha Patel, Ramya Krishnan and Devayani in supporting roles was also made. New told the tale of an 8-year-old boy who is turned into a 28-year-old man by a scientist and Suryah noted that he was loosely inspired by the Hollywood film Big (1988). The film was shot in hundred days, with Suryah revealing he would often stop acting in between the scenes, when he knew that his performance was not up to his expectation as a director.

New released on 9 July 2004 to mixed reviews, with a critic from The Hindu claiming that "belonging to a genre that is rare to our cinema, New however, gets bogged down in a mire of duets and double entenders", but hinted at potential success citing that director "seems to have hit the bull's eye." The movie subsequently went on to become a blockbuster, with music composed by A. R. Rahman being labelled as one of the film's largest selling points. Naani opened the following month to mixed reviews from critics, with a reviewer noting the film suffers from "a bad script and artificialness". The film's adult theme generated controversy, and post-release, women activists in the state of Tamil Nadu demanded a ban on a film after release, which they say contained obscene sex scenes. Suryah responded by claiming that the sex scenes are there because the story line requires them and described his film as "fiction laced with sex and comedy".

In August 2005, the Madras High Court revoked the censor certificate for the film and directed the Chennai Commissioner of Police to investigate two criminal complaints registered against Suryah, ruling that the film did not provide a "clean and healthy entertainment" and that it would be failing in its duty if it did not revoke the censor certificate of the film, claiming it originally attained an "A" certificate "under questionable circumstances". Suryah was then arrested by city police for allegedly throwing a mobile phone at a woman censor board official in a fit of anger during the post-production of the film. He was later released without charge. A further case was launched in March 2006, with the Censor Board filing a complaint against Surya for using stills from scenes that were deleted from the film, with a poster which showed Suryah resting on Simran's cleavage resurfacing. He was subsequently arrested for the second time before being released.

He announced a film titled Isai in 2004 shortly after the release of New, when he revealed that A. R. Rahman would also collaborate for two further ventures titled Anbulla Nanbane and Aezhumazhai vs Chitra. While Isai was postponed, Anbulla Nanbane developed under the title Best Friend, before the title Anbe Aaruyire (2005) was finalised. Featuring himself in the lead role again, he signed up newcomer Meera Chopra for the film and rechristened her under the stage name Nila. He revealed that he was inspired to make the film to convey that young lovers must give each other space and wanted to showcase that attitudes towards relationships by the Indian youth was changing from the previous decade. He called the film a "sequel to Kushi", revealing that the film's lead actors would have similar ego clashes. Like New, the film faced hurdles prior to release with the censor boards insisting on several cuts and Suryah's ongoing legal tussles meant the film was delayed. The film opened to mixed reviews in September 2005, with Sify.com labelling it as "adult entertainment" though added he "tries hard to bring his character Shiva to life but has to go miles as far as dialogue delivery and voice modulation goes but has improved leaps and bound on the dancing front". The film became his fourth consecutive commercial success in Tamil films, with Suryah adamant on thanking his crew for helping get through the controversies, labeling that "team effort" helped them overcome the problems.

Suryah began pre-production work on a directorial venture, Aezhumazhai vs Chitra, a romantic comedy starring Silambarasan and Asin, in January 2005 and the team released images taken from a promotional photo shoot. However the film, which was to be produced by S. S. Chakravarthy, eventually failed to develop and those involved moved on to different ventures. Suryah then began work on a venture titled Puli, a police thriller which would feature Vijay in the lead role, and would have Navodaya Appachan as the producer. In late 2005, reports suggested that Asin would play the leading female role, while Suryah developed the project alongside his commitments as an actor. However, by early 2006, Vijay dropped out of the project after Suryah had refused to make alterations to the script. In January 2006, Isai was reported to be back under way with either S. S. Chakravarthy or Navodaya Appachan being producer and it was suggested that the film would be about a "cunning assistant music director comes to the top". Other reports had also suggested that the film told the tale of the tensions between South Indian musicians Ilaiyaraaja and A. R. Rahman. However the film failed to materialise again, and Suryah postponed production work. Following the postponement of several of his projects, Suryah revealed in April 2006 that he would direct and star in a venture titled Pesum Deivangal for children and family audiences, in an attempt to remove the "sleazy" image he had been associated to in films. Despite pre-production works being carried out, the film also failed to materialise.

=== 2007–2015: Career fluctuations ===
Following the positive reception he received on his acting with New and Anbe Aaruyire, Suryah chose to take a break from directing and opted to act in films directed by other film makers. He was cast as a casanova in Tamilvannan's romantic comedy Kalvanin Kadhali (2006) opposite Nayantara, and the film garnered the industry's anticipation prior to release. It eventually won average reviews and performed well at the box office, with a critic noting "Suryah is improving with each film though he hams the usual way." He had two releases as an actor in 2007, with Sakthi Chidambaram's science fiction comedy Viyabari being the first release. Featuring in an ensemble cast, alongside Tamannaah, Namitha and Vadivelu, Suryah was cast as a businessman who creates a clone of himself to care for his family and playing both roles, Suryah's performance was described as "outrageous, over the top and loud". Similarly, critics noted he is just "a limited actor who just walks through the first half effortlessly doing what he had done in his earlier films" for his performance in Thirumagan. The failure of both films prompted another ongoing venture titled Pandigai to be shelved, and Surya chose to concentrate instead on directing. He made a brief comeback as a lead actor in the psychological thriller Newtonin Moondram Vidhi (2009), which won good reviews but only performed averagely at the box office.

Suryah announced he would re-begin work on his directorial venture Puli, but would instead make it as a Telugu film and Pawan Kalyan would play the lead role. Produced by Singanamala Ramesh, he signed on A. R. Rahman to compose the film's music, while newcomer Nikeesha Patel was selected to play the lead actress. The film took close to three years to produce and was faced delays at regular intervals. The film was finally released in September 2010 and received negative reviews from critics. A reviewer from Sify.com noted "the main problem with the film is that it does not have a credible story or script", adding that Suryah "has done a haphazard work in his writing. There is absolutely no consistency in characterization". Another critic noted Suryah "fails in the screenplay department" and the film has loopholes galore, labelling it as a "disappointment".

In between directorial commitments, he played guest roles in Shankar's Nanban (2012) and as a film director in the horror Pizza 2: The Villa (2013). In 2011, Suryah announced that he would restart Isai and would compose music for the film himself after being recommended by A.R. Rahman, describing it as a "musical" which would explore the battle between a veteran and an emerging music composer. In May 2012, the film's first look posters were revealed, with Sulagna Panigrahi, an Oriya television and film actress introduced in the leading role under the new name Savithri. The film was shot for more than two years, undergoing a notable change in the film's antagonist from Prakash Raj to Sathyaraj in the midst of production. Suryah trained as a musician by taking lessons lasting up to ten hours for a six-month stretch. Isai finished post-production work in late 2014 and had a theatrical release in early 2015.

=== 2016–present: Recent work and comeback success ===
In 2016, Suryah acted in the drama film, Iraivi. His performance as an alcoholic and abusive director fetched highly positive reviews from both critics and audiences, for which he was nominated for national award. Later, Suryah signed and starred in two films, Spyder, a bilingual and Mersal. He played the villain in both the movies. Spyder received mixed response, whereas Mersal became a blockbuster hit. Suryah's performance in Spyder was widely appreciated. Suryah's 2019 venture is Monster, a comedy film co-starring Priya Bhavani Shankar and directed by Nelson Venkatesan of Oru Naal Koothu fame. The film released on 17 May 2019 to positive reviews from critics. Once again, Suryah's performance was critically praised.

In 2021, his film Nenjam Marappathillai directed by Selvaraghavan was released. S. J. Suryah completely steals the show as the lecherous businessman with a deadly performance. Undeniably, Ramsay is one of the finest yet entertaining characters of S. J. Suryah. Suryah's next venture was the Venkat Prabhu-directed Maanaadu (2021), starring Silambarasan and Kalyani Priyadarshan. He played the role of a corrupt cop, his antagonistic role for the third time. This film received highly positive reviews and Suryah's performance was praised. He was seen in Don starring Sivakarthikeyan, essaying the role of an antagonist for the fourth time. He was seen last time as a protagonist in Kadamaiyai Sei which received negative response reviewers and mixed responses from the audience. He was last seen as protagonist in Bommai (2023) a romantic thriller. In his most recent cinematic endeavor, Mark Antony (2023), he garnered critical acclaim for his portrayal of dual characters that are father and son, Jackie Pandian and Madan Pandian, expertly showcasing a distinctive contrast in their villainous personas through a uniquely whimsical approach. The next, Raghava Lawrence and S. J. Suryah acted together in Karthik Subbaraj's directorial Jigarthanda DoubleX (2024), and the film turned out to be a huge hit. He appears as the lead antagonist in S. Shankar's Indian 2 (2024). S. J. Suryah portrays the antagonist with a 'Wolf kind of character" in Dhanush's Raayan (2024). His next work is Veera Dheera Sooran (2025) with Chiyaan Vikram in the lead role. In 2025, Suryah began filming for Killer, his comeback to direction; production was halted a year later after a gas cylinder explosion left five stuntmen with severe burns with one of them dying while undergoing treatment, leading to a criminal investigation.

== Filmography ==
Key
| † | Denotes films that have not yet been released |

=== Tamil films ===
List of S. J. Suryah Tamil film acting credits
| Year | Title | Role | Notes | Ref. |
|---|---|---|---|---|
| 1988 | Nethiyadi | Villager | Uncredited role | |
| 1993 | Kizhakku Cheemayile | Bull trainer | Uncredited role | |
| 1995 | Aasai | Auto driver | Uncredited role | |
| 2000 | Kushi | Pedestrian in Kolkata | Uncredited role | |
| 2004 | New | Pappu (Vishwanathan aka Vichu) and his son (Note: S. J. Suryah plays a dual role.) | Debut film in a leading role | |
| 2004 | Maha Nadigan | Himself | Guest appearance | |
| 2005 | Anbe Aaruyire | Siva & Siva's memory | | |
| 2006 | Kalvanin Kadhali | Sathya | | |
| 2006 | Dishyum | Himself | Guest appearance | |
| 2007 | Thirumagan | Thangapandi | | |
| 2007 | Vyabari | Suryaprakash and his clone | | |
| 2009 | Newtonin Moondram Vidhi | Guru | | |
| 2012 | Nanban | Real Panchavan Pariventhan | Special appearance | |
| 2013 | Pizza II: Villa | Film director | Cameo appearance | |
| 2015 | Isai | A. K. Shiva and Himself | | |
| 2015 | Vai Raja Vai | Himself | Guest appearance | |
| 2015 | Yatchan | Himself | Guest appearance | |
| 2016 | Iraivi | Arul | | |
| 2017 | Spyder | Sudalai | | |
| 2017 | Mersal | Daniel Arockiyaraj | | |
| 2019 | Monster | Anjanam Azhagiya Pillai | | |
| 2021 | Nenjam Marappathillai | Ramaswamy "Ramsay" | | |
| 2021 | Maanaadu | DCP Dhanushkodi | | |
| 2022 | Don | Bhoominathan | | |
| 2022 | Kadamaiyai Sei | Ashok Mauryan | | |
| 2022 | Vadhandhi: The Fable of Velonie | SI Vivek | TV series on Amazon Prime Video | |
| 2023 | Varisu | Aditya Mittal | Cameo appearance | |
| 2023 | Bommai | Raju | | |
| 2023 | Mark Antony | Jackie Pandian & Madhan Pandian | | |
| 2023 | Jigarthanda DoubleX | Kirubakaran "Kirubai" Arokiaraj "Kiruban" / Ray Dasan | | |
| 2024 | Indian 2 | "Sakalakala Vallavan" Sarguna Pandian | | |
| 2024 | Raayan | Sethuraman "Sethu" | | |
| 2025 | Veera Dheera Sooran | SP A. Arunagiri IPS | | |
| 2026 | Love Insurance Kompany | Suriyan | | |
| 2026 | Sardar 2 | Yoganandan "Yogi" as Black Dagger | | |
| 2026 | Jailer 2 | Bodhi Kalpak | | |
| TBA | Bro Club † | TBA | Filming | |
| TBA | Killer | TBA | Filming | |

=== Other language films ===
List of S. J. Suryah other language film acting credits
| Year | Title | Role | Language | Notes | Ref. |
|---|---|---|---|---|---|
| 2001 | Kushi | Pedestrian in Kolkata | Telugu | Uncredited role; archival footage | |
| 2003 | Khushi | Pedestrian in Kolkata | Hindi | Uncredited role; archival footage | |
| 2004 | Naani | Math professor | Telugu | Cameo appearance | |
| 2010 | Puli | Hussain | Telugu | Cameo appearance | |
| 2017 | Spyder | Bhairavudu | Telugu | Bilingual film; Also shot in Tamil | |
| 2024 | Saripodhaa Sanivaaram | CI R. Dayanand | Telugu | | |
| 2025 | Game Changer | CM Bobbili Mopidevi | Telugu | | |
| 2025 | Bha Bha Ba | Oscar | Malayalam | Cameo appearance | |

=== As a film director ===
List of S. J. Suryah film directing credits
| Year | Title | Language | Notes |
|---|---|---|---|
| 1999 | Vaalee | Tamil | |
| 2000 | Kushi | Tamil | Guest appearance |
| 2001 | Kushi | Telugu | Guest appearance; Simultaneously shot with Kushi |
| 2003 | Khushi | Hindi | Guest appearance; Remake of Kushi |
| 2004 | Naani | Telugu | Guest appearance |
| 2004 | New | Tamil | Also producer and acting debut; Simultaneously shot with Naani |
| 2005 | Anbe Aaruyire | Tamil | Also producer and actor |
| 2010 | Puli | Telugu | Guest appearance |
| 2015 | Isai | Tamil | Also producer, music composing debut, and actor |
| TBA | Killer | Tamil | Also actor |

=== As a playback singer ===
List of S. J. Suryah playback singing credits
| Year | Film | Song | Music composer |
|---|---|---|---|
| 1999 | Vaalee | "Vaanil Kaayuthae" | Deva |
| 2007 | Vyabari | "July Maadathil" | Deva |
| 2009 | Newtonin Moondram Vidhi | "Mudhal Murai" | F. S. Faizal (Vinay) |
| 2015 | Isai | "Puthandin Muthal" | S. J. Surya |
| 2016 | Iraivi | "Onnu Rendu" | Santhosh Narayanan |
| 2021 | Nenjam Marappathillai | "En Pondati Oorukku Poita" | Yuvan Shankar Raja |
| 2024 | Saripodhaa Sanivaaram | "Not A Teaser" | Jakes Bejoy |

=== As a lyricist ===
List of S. J. Suryah lyricist credits
| Year | Film | Song | Music composer |
|---|---|---|---|
| 1996 | Sundara Purushan | "Setapa Maathi" | Sirpy |
| 1996 | Purushan Pondatti | "Lottery Enakku" | Sirpy |

=== As a composer ===
- Ishq Wala Love (2014; Marathi)
- Isai (2015)

=== As a narrator ===
- 144 (2015)
- Remo (2016)

== Awards and nominations ==
=== Honors ===
- Honorary doctorate by Vels University (2024)
- Kalaimamani (2025)- Contribution to the Tamil film industry

=== Behindwoods Gold Medals ===
| Year | Nominee / work | Award | Result |
|---|---|---|---|
| 2018 | Mersal | Best Actor in Negative Role (Tamil) | Won |
| 2018 | Spyder | Best Actor in Negative Role (Telugu) | Won |

=== Vijay Award ===
| Year | Nominee / work | Award | Result |
|---|---|---|---|
| 2018 | Spyder | Best Villain | Won |

=== South Indian International Movie Awards ===
| Year | Nominee / work | Award | Result |
|---|---|---|---|
| 2018 | Mersal | Best Actor in Negative Role (Tamil) | Won |
