= Tambaram (disambiguation) =

Tambaram is a city in Chengalpattu district, Tamil Nadu, India within the Chennai metropolitan area.

Tambaram may also refer to these related to the city:

== Places ==
- Tambaram Sanatorium, a neighborhood in Tambaram
  - Tambaram Sanatorium railway station
- Tambaram railway station, the main railway station of Tambaram
- Tambaram Air Force Station, an Indian Air Force station in Tambaram

=== Governance ===
- Tambaram City Municipal Corporation, a local government of Tambaram
- Tambaram Assembly constituency, a state assembly constituency of Tamil Nadu, India

=== Revenue administration ===
- Tambaram division, a revenue division of Chengalpattu district, Tamil Nadu
- Tambaram taluk, a taluk of Tambaram revenue division, Chengalpattu district

== Other ==
- Tambaram Lalitha (died 1983), Indian actress in Tamil cinema

== See also ==
- Thamirabharani (disambiguation)
