= Viyabari =

2007 film by Sakthi Chidambaram

- DVD cover
- Directed by: Sakthi Chidambaram
- Written by: Sakthi Chidambaram
- Produced by: Shakti Preetham; Shakti Threja
- Starring: S. J. Suryah; Tamannaah Bhatia
- Cinematography: M. V. Panneerselvam
- Edited by: S. Suraj Kavee
- Music by: Deva
- Production company: Cinema Paradise
- Release date: 13 July 2007
- Running time: 162 minutes
- Country: India
- Language: Tamil

Viyabari (/vjɑːbɑːri/ transl. Businessman) is a 2007 Indian Tamil-language science fiction comedy film directed and written by Sakthi Chidambaram. The film stars S. J. Suryah in a dual role as a businessman and his clone, alongside an ensemble cast that includes Tamannaah Bhatia, Prakash Raj, Namitha, Malavika, Vadivelu, Santhanam, Seetha, and Nassar. The music was composed by Deva. Cinematography was handled by M. V. Panneerselvam, and editing was done by S. Suraj Kavee.

== Plot ==
Suryaprakash is a businessman who wants to become richer than Bill Gates. In the process, he loses his family and social life. He tells scientist Stephen Raj to clone him so that he can keep concentrating on his business affairs whilst the clone replaces him at home. Savithri, a college girl doing a research project on Suryaprakash, falls in love with him. Suryaprakash is not interested in Savithri but marries her because she is a good cook. After partying with two models and humiliating his brother-in-law "Digil" Paandi, Suryaprakash finally comes to understand the value of family after his mother dies.

== Cast ==
- S. J. Suryah in a dual role as Suryaprakash and his clone
- Tamannaah Bhatia as Savithri
- Prakash Raj as Kasi Viswanathan
- Namitha as Namitha
- Malavika as Model
- Vadivelu as "Dhigil" Paandi
- Santhanam as Suryaprakash's PA
- Seetha as Suryaprakash's mother
- Nassar as Dr Stephen Raj, a scientist
- Seetha Anil as "Dhigil" Paandi's wife
- Sriman as Suryaprakash's PA
- Sathyan as Ad Film Model
- Shakeela as Minister Dairy Development
- Bava Lakshmanan as "Dhigil" Paandi's sidekick
- Bonda Mani as "Dhigil" Paandi's sidekick
- Balaji as "Dhigil" Paandi's sidekick
- Meenal as Suryaprakash's sister
- Master Bharath as Rowdy Rangan's son
- Ravikumar
- Chelladurai
- Kovai Senthil

== Soundtrack ==
The film's music was composed by Deva. S. J. Suryah made his singing debut in this film. Saraswathy Srinivas of Rediff.com wrote, "Vyaabaari is representative of the rot that has infected Tamil film lyrics. Avoid".

Tracks
No.	Title	Lyrics	Singer(s)	Length
1.	"Vetriyai Kandavan"	Na. Muthukumar	Devan Ekambaram, Anitha, Blaaze	5:15
2.	"July Maadham"	Vaali	S. J. Suryah, Kalyani	4:58
3.	"Kadi Kadi Kosu Kadi"	Vaali	Mano, Anuradha Sriram	4:52
4.	"Aasa Patta"	Parinaman	Hariharan, Vaishali	6:01
5.	"Dha Dha Namitha"	Vaali	Arjith, Reshmi	5:33
Total length:				26:39

== Critical reception ==
Sify criticised the film and asked "what the actor and his director was trying to convey through this film — a bit of sleaze and fun or steamy mother sentiments?" Sriram Iyer of Rediff.com wrote, "At quite a few places, the movie seems like a rehash of Surya's earlier films. Its better if Mr.Surya realises that it will look better if someone else pays tribute to his work, rather doing it himself". Malini Mannath of Chennai Online wrote, "Shakti Chidambaram produces, scripts and directs the film. His earlier films with Sathyaraj were fairly engaging entertainers. But 'Vyabari' is just a test of patience". S. R. Ashok Kumar of The Hindu wrote, "Director Shakthi Chidambaram is known for his works in comedy and watching `Vyabari' one feels he could have stuck to what he is best at". Lajjavathi of Kalki praised the acting of Suryah and Bhatia, Deva's music, and Panneerselvam's cinematography, and was thrilled by the innovative ideas of Tamil directors. However, she felt that Chidambaram should have provided a neater screenplay.
