= Thamirabharani =

Thamirabharani may refer to:

- Tamraparni (copper leaf), Sanskrit term for various places:
  - Tambapaṇṇī, place in Sri Lanka, where the legendary Indian Prince Vijaya is said to have landed and founded his capital
  - Kingdom of Tambapanni (543-437 BC), kingdom in present-day Sri Lanka with its capital at Tambapaṇṇī, said to have been founded by Prince Vijaya
  - Taprobana, ancient name for the island of Sri Lanka derived from the Sanskrit term
  - Thamirabarani River or Tamraparni, Tamil Nadu, India
    - Tamiraparani barb, a species of fish found in the river
- Thaamirabharani, a 2007 Indian Tamil film

== See also ==
- Tambaram (disambiguation)
- Tamrapatra, Indian copper plates
- Tamrashatiya or Tamraparniya, early Buddhist school in Sri Lanka
