= Isai =

2015 Indian film by S. J. Suryah

- Theatrical release poster
- Directed by: S. J. Suryah
- Written by: S. J. Suryah
- Produced by: S. Subbiah
- Starring: S. J. Suryah; Sathyaraj; Sulagna Panigrahi
- Cinematography: Soundararajan
- Edited by: K. M. Riyas
- Music by: S. J. Suryah
- Production company: SS Productions
- Distributed by: Annai Mary Madha Creations
- Release date: 30 January 2015
- Running time: 189 minutes
- Country: India
- Language: Tamil

Isai (transl. Music) is a 2015 Indian Tamil-language musical romantic psychological thriller film written, directed and music composed by S. J. Suryah, who starred himself in the lead role alongside Sathyaraj and Sulagna Panigrahi in her Tamil debut. The film marked Suryah's return to direction after a five-year hiatus since 2010, and also his debut as a music composer. The film revolves around the rivalry between Vetriselvan, an established veteran composer and A. K. Shiva, his assistant and an emerging composer in the film industry.

Isai was announced in 2004 with other two projects, but did not materialise. Suryah then revived the project in November 2011. Principal photography commenced in May 2012 and continued till January 2014, despite a brief stalling and production turnaround; filming took place in Chennai and Kodaikanal. The film's cinematography was handled by Soundararajan while editing was done by K. M. Riyas.

After being delayed multiple times, Isai was theatrically released on 30 January 2015. It received generally positive reviews from critics, praising the performances (particularly that of Sathyaraj's), screenplay, direction, cinematography, but was critical of the three-hour length and divided opinions regarding the twist in the climax.

== Plot ==
Vetriselvan (Sathyaraj) is an established and old-fashioned music director who is loved and respected for his works. A. K. Shiva (S. J. Suryah), who works as an assistant under Vetriselvan, gets an opportunity to compose music for a small-time film. When Shiva introduces new techniques and pioneers the use of synthesizers, his music gets the attention of all music lovers. Due to the freshness and modernity that his music possesses, he becomes the most sought after musician and overtakes Vetriselvan. Shiva becomes the number one musician and builds his own studio. Meanwhile, he falls in love with Jeni (Sulagna Panigrahi) and marries her. When it seems everything he touches turns to gold, Vetriselvan displays his true psychopathic form.

Vetriselvan decides to pull down Shiva by any means. Vetriselvan wants to disturb Shiva's peace of mind so that he could not concentrate on music. Vetriselvan enters into a deal with Shiva's car driver, manager, cook, and studio front office staff to get their help in bringing down Shiva. One day, Shiva's car driver parks the car amidst peak traffic and suddenly runs away, which confuses Shiva. He gets disturbed by the continuous honking sound. Shiva's manager also confuses him by giving some fake incidents which did not happen. Jeni gets conceived but gets aborted as Shiva's cook mixes some medicine in her food. Shiva is worried because of Jeni's miscarriage and cries aloud. He thinks that he is mentally disordered and goes to a mental hospital.

Shiva's strange behaviour gets the attention of media, and his image is tarnished amid public. Vetriselvan feels happy seeing this and in the meantime, film directors start approaching him again. Vetriselvan thinks that his lost glory is recovered now. Finally, it is revealed that Jeni is none other than Vetriselvan's daughter who was sent by him so that he can accomplish his plan. Knowing this, Shiva gets furious and comes to kill Jeni. But she reveals that she has really fallen in love with Shiva for his kindness and she is conceived again now. Vetriselvan comes there and persuades to kill Jeni knowing that she really loves Shiva. In the meantime, Vetriselvan stabs Shiva with a knife.

Suddenly, Shiva wakes up, and it is revealed that the entire story was his dream; and that his is S.J. Suryah and Madhu (Nila) (from Anbe Aaruyire) is now his wife, and she says that fans are eagerly awaiting for a movie as he has not made a movie in the last 10 years. Shiva says that he got a story from his dream and needs to decide the climax. The movie ends there.

== Cast ==
- S. J. Suryah in a dual role as
  - A. K. Shiva
  - Himself (cameo)
- Sulagna Panigrahi as Jenny
- Sathyaraj as Vetriselvan
- Thambi Ramaiah as Church Priest
- Ganja Karuppu as Karuppu
- Azhagam Perumal as Gunasekhar
- Monali Sehgal as Lilly
- Gibran Osman as Peter
- Sharad KRG as Sharad
- Seema
- Raja
- AR Murugadoss as himself (cameo)
- Vishnuvardhan as himself (cameo)
- Raju Sundaram as himself (cameo)
- Nila as Madhu (cameo)

== Production ==
=== Development ===
After the release of Anbe Aaruyire (2005), S. J. Suryah was to direct a film titled Isai, which failed to progress. In November 2011, Suryah announced that he would revive Isai and would produce, direct and compose music for the film, having completed writing the new script. Describing it as a musical thriller, was supposed to be made as a bilingual in Tamil and Telugu languages but was ultimately made in Tamil only. Describing the synopsis in August 2012, Suryah stated that it is about the rivalry between two films music composers—a leading veteran composer in the industry being replaced by his younger competitor, leading to the former becoming jealous; he further added "the situations in the film are what we come across in every field. We often find someone reigning supreme in one industry only to be eventually replaced by another. Isai deals with the emotional turmoil and the jealousy one who is pushed from a position of confidence experiences." Initially the film was produced by Victor Raj Pandian under the ASA Productions banner which was credited in the first look posters. But the company opted out and the project was eventually taken over by S. Subbiah of SS Productions.

=== Casting ===
Suryah took three months for finalising the female lead and 124 girls from all over India auditioned, before Oriya-based actress Sulagna Panigrahi in her Tamil debut. She was credited as Savithri. Prakash Raj initially agreed to play the antagonist but opted out of the cast in January 2013 due to scheduling conflicts. Later, that June, Sathyaraj was confirmed to replace Prakash Raj. Sharad KRG, former head of marketing in AGS Cinemas, played the role of Suryah's business manager. He described his role as a "direct contrast" to his earlier role in Maattrraan (2012). Gibran Osman plays the role of an illusionist. He said, "I took on this role so I could learn a lot from Suryah".

Suryah also planned to cast four veteran directors in cameo appearances, with one of them being K. Viswanath. Though Viswanath filmed scenes, they did not make the final cut. Later, Vishnuvardhan, A. R. Murugadoss and Raju Sundaram filmed scenes as the only three directors.

=== Filming ===
Principal photography commenced in late May. By June 2012, scenes featuring Vishnuvardhan were shot in an information technology park at Tambaram. By late-August 2012, the first schedule was complete, and the second schedule began on a set constructed at Binny Mills. A large waterfall set was erected for the schedule. That August, Suryah revealed that he had created a village set in Kodaikanal which consisted of 30 houses and a church in Parapatti, one of the highest hills in the location. He explained that, as per the script, "I go to the village which is surrounded by forests in search of material for my album, Sound of Nature". Cinematographer Soundararajan claimed that it was difficult to access and shoot from that location. As of December 2013, the film was nearly complete except for one song which was left to be shot. Filming wrapped by January 2014.

== Themes and influences ==
The film's plot is said to be inspired from certain real-life incidents that occurred in the lives of Ilayaraaja and A. R. Rahman even though it was denied by Suryah himself. He added that the situations were common in each industry, citing the examples in the Tamil music scene, he added how M. S. Viswanathan slowly made his presence felt when K. V. Mahadevan was at his peak, and Ilaiyaraaja took over Viswanathan's positions, followed by Rahman's entry adding "I'm a great fan of all the four composers, and it would be wrong to say my film targets two of them". M. Suganth of The Times of India noted one similarity with the American film The Truman Show (1998): "Shiva doesn't realize that everyone around his acting a specified role and starts doubting if he has genuinely gone mad". Gauthaman Bhaskaran noted the climactic sequence in the style of M. Night Shyamalan's The Sixth Sense (1999) which "can be viewed both as a surprise and a shock".

== Soundtrack ==
The music and background score of the film was composed by S. J. Suryah, making his debut as a composer through this film. The soundtrack album features eight tracks with three instrumentals; the songs were penned by Madhan Karky. The soundtrack album was released in November 2014.

== Release ==
Initially planned for releasing on 1 May 2014, the same day Suryah's directorial debut Vaalee (1999) was released, the film was pushed back. The makers planned to release the film on 2 October 2014. Later the film was scheduled to release on 30 January 2015. The film released in 300 screens across Chennai and Tamil Nadu which is the highest for an S. J. Suryah-starrer. It had its television premiere via Sun TV on 12 July 2015.

=== Box office ===
Isai opened at second position at the Chennai box office and had an average opening due to its limited release. In its second weekend, the film dropped to fifth position with the show counts being reduced due to newer releases. The film was trimmed by seven minutes from its initial runtime, owing to criticism regarding the film's duration.

=== Critical reception ===
M. Suganth of The Times of India rated three out of five, summarising "Isai isn’t as taut a thriller as Vaalee but despite being overlong [...] it is fairly engaging. The film doesn’t truly come together as a whole but the scenes have the stamp of a director with a sure hand." Suganth however found the climatic twist "which neither feels organic nor ingenious", adding that "Suryah only seems to be acknowledging that he couldn’t come up with a satisfying end to the story he set originally out to film. All it does is give him a loophole to brush away the plot holes. Or, maybe, it his way of telling the whole world that SJ Suryah the director has literally woken up from his decade-long slumber." Anupama Subramanian of Deccan Chronicle gave three-and-a-half out of five and admitted that "Though most part of the screenplay is taut, at times it becomes predictable and drags. But post interval there’s never a dull moment and especially the last 30 minutes, it is director Suryah’s intelligently woven brave attempt that enthralls the audiences keeping them hooked to their seats."

Baradwaj Rangan of The Hindu noted that the storyline "gradually becomes so preposterous that the sheer whatever-next factor pulls you through. After a point, the film lurches madly between psycho-thriller, Victorian melodrama (think Gaslight), horror-movie staples, and [...] a meta musing on the director's long absence from the screen and his return to it. Whatever else, you have to hand him points for audacity." S. Saraswathi of Rediff.com rated three stars out of five summarising "the film is more than three hours long and the script meanders. But the brilliant music, spectacular visuals, perfectly captured by cameraman Soundar Rajan, and some excellent performances by the lead actors keep you hooked."

Rakesh Reddy of Desimartini was critical of the three-hour long runtime and the lack of emotional connect but noted that the climactic sequence "stands out in the film". In a negative review, Gauthaman Bhaskaran of Hindustan Times stated "Isai misses out on being a decent piece of work largely because Suryah could not resist the temptation to get into the frame, and was careless enough to litter it with illogicality—although the end might partly explain this. Even a captivating Sathyaraj cannot pull the picture out of the pit." Ananda Vikatan rated the film 43 out of 100.
