= Nuvvu Vasthavani =

- Theatrical release poster
- Directed by: V. R. Prathap
- Written by: Marudhuri Raja (dialogues)
- Screenplay by: V. R. Prathap
- Story by: Ezhil
- Based on: Thullatha Manamum Thullum (Tamil)(1999) by Ezhil
- Produced by: R. B. Choudary
- Starring: Nagarjuna Akkineni; Simran
- Cinematography: Shyam K. Naidu
- Edited by: Nandamuri Hari
- Music by: S. A. Rajkumar
- Production company: Super Good Films
- Release date: 5 April 2000
- Running time: 158 minutes
- Country: India
- Language: Telugu

Nuvvu Vasthavani (transl. So that you would come) is a 2000 Indian Telugu-language romance film, directed by V. R. Prathap, written by Ezhil, and produced by R. B. Choudary. It stars Nagarjuna Akkineni and Simran in lead roles.The music of the movie was composed by S. A. Rajkumar. The film is a Telugu remake of the 1999 Tamil film Thullatha Manamum Thullum, in which Simran reprised her role.

== Plot ==
The movie starts with Chinni (Nagarjuna) revealing, on a train journey from Pune to Hyderabad, that he just got out of jail after seven years. His past is revealed in a flashback. He had been a singer, waiting for the big break. Indu (Simran) hears his voice though she doesn't see him and becomes his fan. When Chinni realizes this, he tries to reveal who he is but circumstances place him and Indu in situations where she ends up thinking that he is rowdy. Chinni ultimately becomes responsible for her losing her eyesight too. He devotes himself to her from then onwards attending to her every need. She learns to respect and love him too, thinking that he is the singer and not knowing that he is the same person she thought was rowdy.

Chinni had been telling his mother everything by letter and when she dies, she donates her eyes to Indu. To come up with the money needed for the operation, Chinni donates his kidney and has to travel to Pune for the same. Ready to get back, he is arrested after agreeing to look after the luggage (which turns out to contain ammunition) of another man. Back in the present, everything has changed in the place he used to live. He catches a glimpse of Indu, now the collector. When he goes to meet her, she orders her officers to arrest him, remembering him as the rowdy who caused her eyesight loss. But when Chinni begins to sing, Indu realizes that the "rowdy" she arrested was none other than Chinni. She apologizes for misunderstanding him and they happily embrace, rekindling their relationship.

== Cast ==
- Nagarjuna Akkineni as Chinni Krishna
- Simran as Indira "Indu"
- Kota Srinivasa Rao as Koteswara Rao
- Tanikella Bharani as Dr. Paramahamsa
- Brahmanandam as Nicker Narayana
- Ali as Madhava
- Sudhakar as Balu
- Mallikarjuna Rao as Nadar
- Surya as Krishna's friend
- Sivaji Raja as Dasu
- Varsha as Anitha
- Rama Prabha as Indu's grandmother
- Y. Vijaya as Koteswara Rao's wife
- Sudha as Indu's teacher
- Nutan Prasad
- Ponnambalam as Indu's house owner
- Prasad Babu as Reddy
- Raghu Kunche
- Bandla Ganesh as Shyam's friend
- K. K. Sarma as Postman
- Madhusudhan Rao as Henchman
- Visweswara Rao as Shopper
- Gadiraju Subba Rao
- Ananth as Newcomer to the City
- Naveen
- Raksha

== Soundtrack ==
Nuvvu Vastavani

Soundtrack album by S. A. Rajkumar
- Released: 2000
- Genre: Soundtrack
- Length: 30:13
- Label: Aditya Music
- Producer: S. A. Rajkumar

S. A. Rajkumar chronology
Ravanna (2000)	Nuvvu Vastavani (2000)	Maa Annayya (2000)

The music was composed by S. A. Rajkumar. Music released on ADITYA Music Company. Except "Komma Komma", all other tunes were used from the original Tamil film. Rajkumar reused "Komma Komma" in Tamil as "Unnai Kodu" in Unnai Kodu Ennai Tharuven (2000) and in Kannada as "Halli Hudugi" in Ramakrishna (2004). Meghamai song was reused from the song 'Sayonee' (1997).

No.	Title	Lyrics	Singer(s)	Length
1.	"Patala Pallakivai"	Sirivennela Sitaramasastri	S. P. Balasubrahmanyam	4:56
2.	"Komma Komma"	ES Murthy	Hariharan, K. S. Chithra	4:24
3.	"Kalalonaina"	Chandrabose	S. P. Balasubrahmanyam	5:04
4.	"Meghamai"	Pothula Ravikiran	Rajesh Krishnan, Sujatha Mohan	4:22
5.	"Railu Bandini"	Chandrabose	Shankar Mahadevan	4:45
6.	"Patala Pallakivai-II"	Sirivennela Sitaramasastri	K.S. Chitra	4:56
7.	"Neeve Devunivi"	Suddala Ashok Teja	Sujatha Mohan	1:19
Total length:				30:13

== Reception ==
A critic from Sify wrote that "It seems that Nagarjuna has finally delivered a hit with “Nuvvu Vasthavani” and it is a wholesome entertainer from the stable of Supergood Films. Nagarjuna and Simran excels in this love story backed up with melodious music by S.A.Rajkumar. Particularly the title number “Nuvvu Vasthavani" is bound to catch up with listeners. Except for pedestrian comedy track, director Pratap sustains the grip of the `twist` logically by creating realistic situations". Jeevi of Idlebrain.com wrote, "". Andhra Today wrote "The first half of the movie may get a lukewarm response from the audience, but this could have been made up by introducing some comedy with Chinni's friends. As the second half builds up the tempo, the audience is treated to a pleasant surprise with the climax. Emotional scenes have been deftly handled. Especially the scenes with the motherly sentiment have been handled cleverly without the mother being present!".

== Box office ==
The film was a box office success and ran for more than a hundred days.
