= Agni Paravai =

Indian Tamil-language soap opera

- Also known as: Fire Bird
- Genre: Soap opera
- Directed by: Kavithabharathi
- Starring: Simran; Madhumila; Manush; Dr. Sharmila
- Country of origin: India
- Original language: Tamil
- No. of seasons: 2
- No. of episodes: 134

Production
- Producer: Ramesh
- Camera setup: Multi-camera
- Running time: approx. 20-22 minutes per episode

Original release
- Network: Puthuyugam TV
- Release: 4 November 2013 – 16 May 2014

Agni Paravai (transl. Fire bird) is a 2013 Indian Tamil-language soap opera that aired on Puthuyugam TV from 4 November 2013 to 16 May 2014 on Monday through Friday at 8:30PM IST. The show stars Simran, Madhumila, Manush, Dr. Sharmila and directed by Kavithabharathi, based on a true story. The show last aired on 16 May 2014 and ended with 134 episodes. It also aired on the Malaysia Tamil channel Astro Vaanavil.

== Plot ==
Madhavi is a forty-year-old, widowed college professor. She goes for a vacation. When she returns from the semester holidays, to everybody's surprise, she is found pregnant.

== Cast ==
- Simran as Madhavi (episodes 01-69, dead)
- Madhumila
- Venkat Renganathan
- Manush
- Dr. Sharmila
- Balambika
- Uday Mahesh
- Ravikanth
- Venkatesh
- Deepa Shankar
- Sri Kala
- Saakshi Siva as Madhavi's husband (cameo role)

== International broadcast ==
The series was released on 4 November 2013 on Puthuyugam TV and was also broadcast internationally.

- In Singapore Tamil Channel on V Thamizh HD It aired Monday through Friday at 9:00PM.
- In Malaysia Tamil Channel on Astro Vaanavil. It aired Monday through Friday at 5:30PM.
- It was aired in the United States, Europe and Australia on Athavan TV.
