= Meera Chopra =

Indian actress

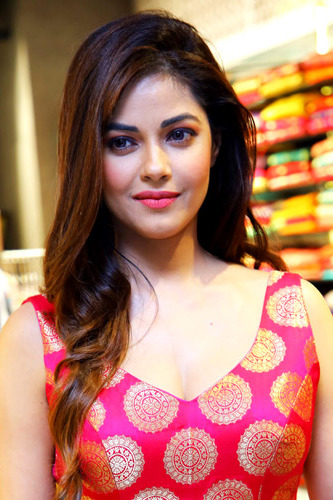
- Other names: Meerra Chopraa; Nila
- Occupations: Actress, model
- Years active: 2005–present
- Spouse: Rakshit Kejriwal (m. 2024)
- Relatives: Chopra family

Meera Chopra (also spelled as Meerra Chopraa) is an Indian actress and producer who has appeared in Tamil, Telugu, and Hindi-language films. In Tamil films, she is credited as Nila.

== Early life and education ==
Chopra was born in India. She attended SGTB Khalsa College, Delhi University, but later left her studies to pursue a career in films. She subsequently continued her education in the United States and completed a master's degree in mass communication and journalism from Saginaw Valley State University in Michigan.

Bollywood actresses Priyanka Chopra, Parineeti Chopra, and Mannara Chopra are her paternal second cousins. Chopra has discussed her relationship with the Chopra family in interviews, noting a close familial bond with her cousins Priyanka, Parineeti and Mannara.

== Personal life ==
Chopra married businessman Rakshit Kejriwal in Jaipur on March 12, 2024.

== Film career ==
Meera's Tamil debut was with the 2005 film Anbe Aaruyire, in which she starred with S. J. Surya. Her second film was Bangaram, a Telugu-language film starring Pawan Kalyan, followed by her critically acclaimed performance in M. S. Raju's Vaana. Much later she made her Bollywood debut in Vikram Bhatt's 1920 London: Fear Strikes Again, with Sharman Joshi. She's also worked in Satish Kaushik's Gang of Ghosts, produced by Venus. Meera is set to work in Nastik opposite Arjun Rampal which is set to release in late 2021. She played Anjali Dangle in a 2019 film Section 375 with Akshaye Khanna and Richa Chaddha.

In 2023, she was cast in a movie dealing with women's asexuality called 'Superwoman'.

In addition to acting, Chopra established her own production company, Pincmoon Meta Studios. She produced her first feature film, Gandhi Talks, which is a silent film featuring music composed by A. R. Rahman.

== Filmography ==
As Producer

| Year | Film | Notes |
|---|---|---|
| 2026 | Gandhi Talks | |

As Actor

Key
| † | Denotes films that have not yet been released |

| Year | Film | Role | Language | Notes |
|---|---|---|---|---|
| 2005 | Anbe Aaruyire | Madhu/Madhu's memory | Tamil | |
| 2006 | Bangaram | Sandhya Reddy | Telugu | |
| 2006 | Jambhavan | Ezhil | Tamil | |
| 2007 | Lee | Chellammal | Tamil | |
| 2007 | Marudhamalai | Divya | Tamil | |
| 2008 | Kaalai | Nila | Tamil | Special appearance in the song "Guththa Lakkadi" |
| 2008 | Vaana | Nandhini Choudhary | Telugu | |
| 2008 | Arjun | Nila/Kodan Rama's daughter | Kannada | |
| 2008 | Jaganmohini | Azhagu Nachiyar | Tamil | |
| 2011 | Maaro | Priya | Telugu | |
| 2013 | Greeku Veerudu | Maya | Telugu | |
| 2014 | Gang of Ghosts | Tina Chopra | Hindi | |
| 2015 | Isai | Madhu | Tamil | Cameo appearance |
| 2015 | Killadi | Anjali | Tamil | |
| 2016 | 1920 London | Shivangi | Hindi | |
| 2017 | One | Priya | English | |
| 2019 | Section 375 | Anjali Dangle | Hindi | |
| 2022 | Nastik | | Hindi | |
| 2023 | Safed | Kaali | Hindi | |

== Television ==
| Year | Title | Role | Platform | Notes | Ref |
|---|---|---|---|---|---|
| 2021 | The Tattoo Murders | ACP Aditi Acharya | Hotstar | Lead role | |
| 2022 | Hiccups and Hookups | Fatima (Fatty) | Lionsgate | | |
