= Sundarakanda (TV series) =

Indian television series, 2009 to 2011

- Genre: Soap opera Drama; Thriller
- Written by: Raja
- Directed by: Raja
- Starring: Simran; Sujitha; Rishi
- Opening theme: Gayathiri and K.M.R.K; Telugu
- Country of origin: India
- Original language: Telugu
- No. of seasons: 01
- No. of episodes: 425

Production
- Producer: G3 THE STUDIO
- Production locations: Andhra Pradesh; Brooklyn Bridge; New York City
- Camera setup: Multi-camera
- Running time: approx. 20-22 minutes per episode

Original release
- Network: Gemini TV (2009-2011); Polimer TV (2012-2013); Puthuyugam TV (2014-2016)
- Release: 30 November 2009 – 15 July 2011

Sundarakanda was a 2009-2011 Telugu soap opera Produced by G3 Studio, Directed by Raja that aired on Gemini TV, and dubbed into Tamil and telecasted on Polimer TV and Puthuyugam TV. It was dubbed in Tamil as Sundarakandam which aired on Polimer TV and as Asoakavanam which aired on Puthuyugam TV. This is one of the South Indian TV serials to be shot in America for 30 days. The show stars Simran, Sujitha, Sai Kiran and Indraja.

== Cast ==
- Simran as Jayashree
- Sujitha as Sneha
- Rishi / Sai Kiran as Ajay
- Indraja as Pavithra
- Manjula Vijayakumar as Mahalakshmi

=== Additional cast ===
- Subhashini/Preeti Nigam as Bhanumathi Devi
- Suresh Krishnamoorthy as Sanjay
- G. V. Narayana Rao as Bhaskar Rao
- Bhavani as Rajalakshmi
- Narasimharaju
- Sri Lakshmi
- Priya as Priya
- M.Bakthavatsalam
- Deepika
- Shravan Rajesh as Sriram
- Mahalakshmi as Deepika
- Sneha Nambiar as Shalini
- Sumangali as Vaani
- Vivek as Krishna
- Jaya Vahini as Durga
- M.Vasu as Yadagiri
- Mimicri Nageswara Rao
- Gopikar
- Deepa as Ramani
- Sruthi Reddy as Varsha
- Srikar as Arya
- Shireesha as Swathi
- Durga as Swapna
- Sathya Sai as Neelima
- Shareef
- Prabhakar
- Venkatesh
