= John Apparao 40 Plus =

- Poster
- Directed by: Kuchipudi Venkat
- Written by: Kuchipudi Venkat
- Produced by: Kuchipudi Venkat
- Starring: Krishna Bhagavan; Simran
- Cinematography: V. Gopinath
- Music by: Kiran Varanasi
- Distributed by: Black and Eight Production
- Release date: 20 March 2008
- Country: India
- Language: Telugu

John Apparao 40 Plus (Note: Titled on screen as John Apparao 40+.) is a 2008 Indian Telugu film starring Krishna Bhagavan and Simran with Jeeva, Shankar Melkote, Satyam Rajesh and Vasu Inturi in supporting roles. The film was theatrically released on 20 March 2008.

== Plot ==
Appa Rao (Krishna Bhagavan) is a career-oriented fashion designer who is in his 40s. He is still a bachelor due to lack of opportunities and career orientation. That is when a posh lady, Pravalika (Simran), approaches him and makes him fall in love with her. She offers him a new career and great business in the UK. Meantime, it is revealed that there is a dreaded ISI agent called John Alias Mastan (Krishna Bhagavan) who looks just like Appa Rao. The rest of the story is all about what happens to Appa Rao when his look-alike John spots him.

== Cast ==
- Krishna Bhagavan as John/Masthan Bhai and Appa Rao
- Simran as Pravalika
- Sayaji Shinde as Razaq
- Shankar Melkote as Tarun Manikyal Rao
- Jeeva as John's friend
- Venu Madhav
- Banerjee
- Ali
- Jaya Prakash Reddy as Police Inspector
- Raghu Babu
- Satyam Rajesh as John's friend
- Ravi Prakash
- Sivannarayana Naripeddi
- Kinnera
- Vasu Inturi as John's friend
- Prudhvi Raj
- Allari Subhashini as Doctor
- Ruthika as a Fashion Model and Special Dance Number "Meghalalo Telepommanndi"

== Production ==
The film is directed by Kuchipudi Venkat, who previously directed Modati Cinema (2005) with Krishna Bhagawan (in his lead debut) and Simran in the lead roles. A song was shot in Bali. Rutika was cast as the second lead. The film was shot in 2007.

== Soundtrack ==
This film contains six songs, all remixes. The music director was Kiran Varanasi. The soundtrack was launched on 2 February 2008.

Song	Singer(s)	Duration	Notes
"Ennenno Janmala Bandham"	Hemachandra, Geetha Madhuri	3:53	from Pooja (1975)
"Meghalalo Telipommannadi"	Sainoj, Delsy Ninan	4:22	from Gulabi (1995)
"Kajara Mohabbatwala"	Tanya and Kiran Varanasi	2:42	from Kismat (1968)
"O Bangaru Rangula Chilaka"	Dr. Banti, Pooja	3:54	from Thota Ramudu (1975)
"Ninnukori Varnam"	Pranavi	4:14	from Agni Natchathiram (1988)

== Release and reception ==
The film was scheduled to release on Sankranti in 2008. A critic from Sify gave a negative review and opined that "Director Venkat has no grip on the screenplay and his directorial skills prove he is inexperienced. Remix songs by old hits are good. On the whole, the film fails to impress". Y. Sunitha Chowdhary of The Hindu wrote that "The comedian who is known for his poker faced and spooky one liners comes across as a versatile actor here, never once overacts but unfortunately the double meaning dialogues and sexual innuendos make the film unfit for family viewing". A critic from Rediff.com wrote that "The film has some humorous lines, no doubt, and starts off as a comedy but post-interval, it veers off into something else totally. Well, that's the kahani mein twist (transl. twist in the story)".
