= Thullatha Manamum Thullum =

- Poster
- Directed by: S. Ezhil
- Written by: N. Prasanna Kumar; Na. Anbharasu (uncredited)
- Screenplay by: S. Ezhil
- Story by: S. Ezhil
- Produced by: R. B. Choudary
- Starring: Vijay; Simran
- Cinematography: R. Selva
- Edited by: V. Jaishankar
- Music by: S. A. Rajkumar
- Production company: Super Good Films
- Release date: 29 January 1999
- Running time: 152 minutes
- Country: India
- Language: Tamil

Thullatha Manamum Thullum (transl. Even the heart that doesn't bounce, will bounce) is a 1999 Indian Tamil-language musical romantic drama film written and directed by debutant S. Ezhil. It stars Vijay and Simran, while Manivannan, Dhamu and Vaiyapuri among others play supporting roles. The film is produced by R. B. Choudary of Super Good Films and has its music composed by S. A. Rajkumar and cinematography performed by R. Selva.

Thullatha Manamum Thullum was released on 29 January 1999. The film received positive reviews and became a huge commercial success, winning three Tamil Nadu State Film Awards including second prize for Best Film and Best Actress (Simran). It was remade in Telugu as Nuvvu Vasthavani (2000), in Kannada as O Nanna Nalle (2000), in Bengali as Sathi (2002) and in Odia as I Love You (2004).

== Plot ==
The film starts with Kutty revealing, on a train journey from Pune to Chennai, that he just got out of jail after seven years. His past is revealed in a flashback. Kutty is an aspiring but struggling singer who works for a local cable provider Mani. He is unable to get recognition and a stage to exhibit his musical talent. Rukmani "Rukku", a college student, is new to the locality where Kutty stays, and on hearing Kutty's voice, she becomes his fan and decides to seek him and encourage his talent as his voice resembles that of her late father. However, Rukmani always catches Kutty in negative situations and, not knowing that he is Kutty, develops a hatred for him as she thinks that he is a rowdy. Once, when Kutty is pickpocketed, he pursues the pickpocket to Rukmani's college. In the process, he accidentally drops a bottle of acid to the ground, which causes Rukmani, who is present there, to go blind.

Kutty is horrified when he finds out that he is the reason Rukmani has gone blind. To make amends, he decides to become her close companion and help her in every way possible. Soon, love blossoms between the two. When Kutty's mother dies, he finds out that her eyes had been donated. He decides to arrange the operation to restore Rukmani's eyesight with his mother's eyes, but as the price of the operation turns out to be very high, he accepts an offer from a Sikh man to donate a kidney for his Pune-based father for ₹40,000. Having paid for Rukmani's surgery, Kutty leaves for Pune to donate his kidney. While waiting at the railway station to return to Chennai, he is framed as a terrorist and arrested. He is then jailed in Pune prison.

Seven years later, Kutty is released from prison and returns to Chennai, only to find out that Rukmani had moved out of their locality and is now a collector, her eyesight having been restored as well. But Rukmani, on seeing Kutty and not knowing that he is Kutty, orders for him to be arrested, in revenge for his "rowdy activities" in the past and for making her blind. But when Kutty begins to sing, Rukmani realises that the "rowdy" she had arrested is none other than Kutty. She apologises for misunderstanding him, and they happily embrace.

== Cast ==
- Vijay as Kutty
- Simran as Rukmani
- Manivannan as Mani
- Dhamu as Madhan
- Vaiyapuri as Kalyanasundaram aka Kalyani
- Chaplin Balu as Nayar
- Thaadi Balaji as Balaji
- Madhan Bob as Dr. Ganesh
- Ponnambalam as Rukmani's house owner
- Mahanadi Shankar as a henchman
- Radhabhai as Rukmani's grandmother
- K. R. Vatsala as Mani's wife
- Tharini as Rukmani's professor
- Theni Kunjarammal as the grandma who advises Rukmani to talk to Kutty
- Paari Venkat as Trouser Pandi
- Sri Kala as Anitha
- Scissor Manohar as the man travelling to Ice House
- Mottai Krishnamoorthy as a man in the liquor shop
- Rajasekar as a doctor (special appearance)
- Raneesh as a bystander in "Innisai Paadivarum" (uncredited)

== Production ==
=== Development ===
The film saw director S. Ezhil, an erstwhile assistant to the duo Robert–Rajasekar, Panneer and Parthiban, make his debut as a filmmaker under R. B. Choudary's production house Super Good Films. The film's concept was inspired from Charlie Chaplin's City Lights (1931) that Ezhil had watched during a film festival. An earlier version of the script showed the lead character as a painter. The initial title for the film was Rukmanikkaga (transl. For Rukmani), but Choudary later changed it to Thullatha Manamum Thullum (transl. Even the heart that doesn't bounce, will bounce).

=== Casting ===
Ezhil initially wanted comedian Vadivelu to play the lead role. Murali was also considered for the lead role before Vijay was selected. On the suggestion of his friends, Ezhil decided to make the film with a commercial hero and changed the entire script retaining only the emotional core of City Lights. Prior to its release, the role of Vijay's mother in the film was kept under wraps with the media speculating who would play the role. Eventually, no actress played the role although the character played a pivotal part in the film. Rambha was initially supposed to do the project, but as the project underwent changes, the actress opted out before she was replaced by Simran.

=== Filming ===
Principal photography began with the song "Dhuddu" as the director felt it would give the team some time to gel, this was choreographed by Raju Sundaram. The story takes place in Triplicane because Ezhil had lived there for a while in his uncle's house. The team scouted for a long time to find a suitable location that fit the story's requirements however a chance visit to the set of a Malayalam film at Murugalaya Studios convinced Ezhil that erecting a set would be far more cost-effective and thus set resembling Triplicane was erected.

== Soundtrack ==
Thullatha Manamum Thullum

Soundtrack album by S. A. Rajkumar
- Released: November 1998
- Genre: Feature film soundtrack
- Length: 34:06
- Language: Tamil
- Label: Star Music

S. A. Rajkumar chronology
Suriya Paarvai (1999)	Thullatha Manamum Thullum (1998)	Suyamvaram (1999)

The soundtrack was composed by S. A. Rajkumar. He agreed to compose the music for this film after learning that Ezhil had assisted Robert–Rajasekar, who introduced him in films. The song "Meghamaai Vandhu" which was supposed to be the theme song of the film, was inspired from Urdu song "Sayonee" sang by the Pakistani band Junoon in 1997; Ezhil wanted a Tamil version of it. After the song was recorded, he learned that Deva had used the same tune for "Salomiya" from Kannedhirey Thondrinal. Rajkumar told him not to worry and gave him the tune of "Innisai Paadi Varum", which is set to the raga Keeravani.

Track listing
No.	Title	Lyrics	Singer(s)	Length
1.	"Thoda Thodu Enavae Vanavil"	Vairamuthu	Hariharan, K. S. Chithra	4:44
2.	"Innisai Paadivarum" (male)	Vairamuthu	P. Unnikrishnan	4:55
3.	"Irupathu Kodi"	Vairamuthu	Hariharan	5:05
4.	"Innisai Paadivarum" (female)	Vairamuthu	K.S.Chithra	4:55
5.	"Palapalakkudhu"	Vairamuthu	Gopal Rao	5:02
6.	"Megamai Vanthu"	Muthu Vijayan	Rajesh Krishnan	4:21
7.	"Kakkai Siraginilae"	Bharathiyar	Sujatha	1:21
8.	"Innisai Paadivarum" (sad)	Vairamuthu	P. Unnikrishnan, Chorus	5:03
Total length:				34:06

== Release ==
Thullatha Manamum Thullum was released on 29 January 1999. The film received positive reviews and became a huge commercial success, running for over 200 days in theatres across Tamil Nadu.

=== Critical reception ===
Kala Krishnan Ramesh from Deccan Herald mentioned that "the experience of seeing the film is simply thrilling", mentioning that the success comes from "the naivete, the simplicity, the absolute lack of sophistication, and from the delightful hero (Vijay)". Rajitha of Rediff.com praised the "unusual premise" and wrote that Ezhil "makes a strong debut with this film". Ananda Vikatan rated the film 41 out of 100. Thamarai Manaalan of Dinakaran wrote, "Newface director Ezhil thinks in a novel and innovative way" and concluded, "Ezhil who's stepped into direction has come and conquered too". D. S. Ramanujam of The Hindu wrote, "Debutant director S. Ezhil makes his bow on a high note in Super Good Films', Thullatha Manamum Thullum, making a good blend of the entertainment elements through his screenplay based on his story". K. N. Vijiyan of New Straits Times wrote, "This is an entertaining movie, which uses humour effectively. It will serve to further boost the stature of both Vijay and Simran at the box-office".

=== Accolades ===
The film won three Tamil Nadu State Film Awards, which include second prize for Best Film (R. B. Choudary), Best Actress (Simran), and the MGR Honorary Award (Vijay).

== Legacy ==
The success of Thullatha Manamum Thullum led to more offers for Simran, who with Thullatha Manamum Thullum and Vaalee, established herself among the leading actresses in Tamil films. Vijay and Simran were also paired together in several other films after the film's success, with projects titled Priyamaanavale (2000) and Udhaya (2004) launched weeks after the film's release. The film went on to be remade in Telugu as Nuvvu Vasthavani, in Kannada as O Nanna Nalle, in Bengali as Sathi, and in Odia as I Love You.
