= Priyamaanavale =

- Poster
- Directed by: K. Selva Bharathy
- Story by: Bhoopathi Raja
- Based on: Pavitra Bandham (Telugu)
- Produced by: C. Venkata Raju; G. Sivaraju
- Starring: Vijay; Simran
- Cinematography: Selva. R
- Edited by: B. S. Vasu-Saleem
- Music by: S. A. Rajkumar
- Production company: Gita Chitra International
- Release date: 26 October 2000
- Running time: 160 minutes
- Country: India
- Language: Tamil
- Budget: ₹3 crore
- Box office: ₹18 crore

Priyamaanavale (transl. Beloved Woman) is a 2000 Indian Tamil-language romantic drama film directed by K. Selva Bharathy. The film stars Vijay and Simran in the lead roles with S. P. Balasubrahmanyam, Vivek and Radhika Chaudhari in supporting roles. It revolves around a working woman in a struggling family marrying a billionaire for the upbringing of her poor family and the distress she receives from her NRI husband with non-Indian cultural shades but later realises about the importance of Indian culture and marriage and then becomes a loving and caring husband. This film is the Tamil remake of the 1996 Telugu film Pavitra Bandham, with SPB reprising his role from the original.

Priyamaanavale released on 26 October 2000. It received positive reviews and became a commercial blockbuster success.

== Plot ==
Vijay is the only son of a rich industrialist, Vishwanathan. Having pursued his education in the US, he is highly Westernised and spends his time partying and enjoying with his friends Chandru and Sowmya instead of managing his father's business. Moreover, he has no faith in the institution of marriage. When Vishwanathan decides to get Vijay married in order to make him more responsible, Vijay agrees under the condition that the marriage is valid only for one year, and that he will decide if he wants to continue the marriage after that. Vishwanathan is upset at this as he feels that no girl will accept the conditions put forth by Vijay. He explains his situation to his personal assistant, Priya, and requests her to marry him, with the idea that Priya would be able to change Vijay and make him more responsible.

Priya initially refuses on knowing about Vijay's agreement. However, she is the sole breadwinner of her family. She has an elder sister who needs to undergo a heart surgery, a younger sister who needs to get married, and a brother, Shankar, who is unemployed. So she decides to sacrifice her life and marry Vijay, accepting the conditions of his marriage agreement, for the sake of her family. Vijay and Priya become good friends after marriage and Priya's family improves. However, Vijay refuses to consider Priya as his wife. On Priya's insistence, Vijay decides to work in his father's office, where he gets to know about the embezzlement made by his office employees Manohar, who is Vijay's uncle and Sowmya's father, and 7 Times?, Priya's crude and uncouth uncle who lusts for her. He dismisses them and lodges a police complaint against them. In retribution, Manohar and 7 Times orchestrate a car accident, severely injuring Vijay. Priya takes good care of Vijay and he soon recovers.

During their first wedding anniversary, Vijay, to everyone's shock, decides to end their marriage as per his agreement, claiming that he only considered Priya as a friend and never as a wife, and drops Priya back to her home. Priya is deeply hurt by Vijay's behaviour, and she also gets verbally harassed by many men for accepting an "agreement" marriage. Vijay continues his carefree lifestyle for some more days until he sees an old beggar carrying his paralysed wife on his back and begging at a traffic signal. When questioned, the beggar says that even though his wife cannot recover, it is his duty to look after her till her death. This incident makes Vijay realise his mistake, understand the Indian culture and feel guilty that even an old and poor beggar can take care of his wife, while he could not. He rushes to Priya's home, apologises to her and requests her to return to him. But Priya refuses as her faith in Vijay has been shattered. Meanwhile, Manohar and 7 Times again attempt to cause trouble for Vijay, prompting him to get them arrested.

Priya gets a job at another company. Vijay takes over that company, even though it is running under heavy loss, so that Priya will work in his company as his personal assistant. But Priya refuses to talk to Vijay and snubs all of his efforts to reconcile with her. Priya soon realises that she is pregnant. She invites Vijay, Vishwanathan and her company employees to her seemantham (baby shower). However, she uses the Seemantham function as an opportunity to insult Vijay and Vishwanathan, revealing to all the guests present that Vijay is her husband and left her after one year as per his agreement. Vijay retaliates by saying that Priya did marry him and accepted the conditions in his agreement, not out of love for him, nor with the intention to reform him, but to use his money to fix the various issues in her family. He leaves the function with his father and friends, but not before telling Priya that he will give up the custody of their child to her.

As a last-ditch resort, Vijay, Chandru, Shankar and Vijay's driver Stepnee, hatch a plan to bring back Priya to Vijay. They decide to tell Priya that Vijay is about to get killed by his ex-employees Manohar and 7 Times whom he had sent to jail earlier so that Priya will change her mind and reunite with Vijay. When Priya find out about the trick, she rushes to Vijay's home to admonish him for his cheap behaviour. But it turns out that Manohar and 7 Times really escaped from prison and stabbed Vijay after a fight. When Priya realises that Vijay is really wounded and attempts to help, she slips and falls down, and goes into labor. Vijay manages to drive Priya to the hospital despite his condition. Priya gives birth to a baby boy, while Vijay is operated upon again and manages to recover. In the end, Vijay and Priya reunite again.

== Cast ==
- Vijay as Vijay
- Simran as Priya
- Radhika Chaudhari as Sowmya, Manohar's daughter
- SPB as Vishwanathan, Vijay's father
- Vivek as Chandru, Vijay's friend
- Vaiyapuri as Stepnee, Vijay's driver
- Ramji as Shankar, Priya's brother
- Delhi Ganesh as Marudhu, Vishwanathan's servant
- Thalaivasal Vijay as Manohar, Vijay's uncle who later betrays him
- Kazan Khan as 7 Times, Priya's uncle
- Sangeetha as Priya's mother
- Bhuvaneswari as Priya's colleague
- Indhu as Priya's elder sister
- Shilpa as Priya's younger sister
- Sairam as Indhu's husband and Priya's brother-in-law
- Minnal Deepa as Priya's colleague
- S. A. Rajkumar (music director and cameo appearance)
- Anuradha Paudwal in a cameo appearance in the song "Enakoru Snegidhi"
- S. Sathyendra as beggar (uncredited)

== Production ==
After Ninaithen Vandhai (1998), K. Selva Bharathy and Vijay had considered collaborating again on a project titled Thalatta Varuvala co-starring Isha Koppikar and Rambha, but later chose to select a different script. Filming began in April 2000, after Vijay completed the shooting for his previous romantic comedy film Kushi which was released in May 2000. The film was a Tamil remake of the 1996 Telugu film Pavitra Bandham. Vivek was signed to play a comic role in the film and wrote his scenes. Vijay's son, Jason Sanjay, was born during a schedule of the film with Vijay unable to attend his birth in London. The film teamed up with Coca-Cola for their publicity campaign after Vijay had signed on to the soft drink company as a brand ambassador.

== Soundtrack ==
The soundtrack was composed by S. A. Rajkumar. The audio rights were acquired by Sony Music India. The song "Welcome Girls Welcome Boys" interpolates "Coco Jamboo" by Mr. President. The song "Kalyanam Enbadhu" is based on "Aparupamainadamma" from Pavithra Bandham. That song was not included in the soundtrack instead it was featured only in the film.

Track listing
No.	Title	Lyrics	Singer(s)	Length
1.	"Welcome Girls Welcome Boys"	Vaali	Sukhwinder Singh	4:35
2.	"Ennavo Ennavo"	Vaali	Hariharan, Mahalakshmi Iyer	4:53
3.	"Enakoru Snegidhi"	Vaali	Hariharan, Mahalakshmi Iyer	4:57
4.	"June July Maadhathil"	P. Vijay	Shankar Mahadevan, Harini	4:36
5.	"Mississippi Nadhi Kulunga"	Vaali	Vijay, Anuradha Sriram	4:21
6.	"Aayulin Andhivarai"	Vaali	K. S. Chithra	1:09
7.	"Azhage Azhage"	Vaali	P. Unnikrishnan	1:53
8.	"Kalyanam Enbadhu"		Unni Menon	3:35
Total length:				25:04

== Release and reception ==
Priyamaanavale released on 26 October 2000 alongside K. S. Ravikumar's Thenali and became a commercial success. A reviewer from Cinematoday2.itgo.com labelled it as "a clean family entertainer that with its Indian culture-versus foreign culture theme would appeal to family audiences" and mentioned that "the script is cleverly crafted", and that "Vijay neatly underplayed his role with Simran as the perfect foil." Visual Dasan of Kalki wrote that Selvabharathi, who debuted with Ninaithen Vandhai, made us think we got a perfect remake, and the director got pass marks this time. Ananda Vikatan rated the film 41 out of 100. Savitha, who dubbed Simran's voice, won the Tamil Nadu State Film Award for Best Female Dubbing Artist, the film's only win at the ceremony.
