= New (film) =

2004 film by S. J. Surya

- VCD cover
- Directed by: S. J. Suryah
- Written by: S. J. Suryah
- Produced by: S. J. Suryah
- Starring: S. J. Suryah; Simran
- Cinematography: K. V. Guhan
- Edited by: Anthony
- Music by: A. R. Rahman
- Production company: Annai Mary Madha Creations
- Release date: 9 July 2004
- Running time: 167 minutes
- Country: India
- Language: Tamil

New is a 2004 Indian Tamil-language science fiction sex comedy film directed, written and produced by S. J. Suryah, who also stars alongside Simran. Kiran Rathod and Devayani play supporting roles. The music was composed by A. R. Rahman, in his first collaboration with S. J. Suryah. In the film, an 8-year-old child gets an experiment done on him that requires him to live as himself during the day and like a 28-year-old man at night. Chaos begins after he toggles between two roles simultaneously.

New was simultaneously shot in Telugu as Naani with Mahesh Babu and Ameesha Patel, while Devayani reprised her role in Naani. The plot is adapted from the 1988 American film Big. It was released on 9 July 2004.

== Plot ==
Eight-year-old Pappu always troubles his mother Indira and frequently gets scoldings due to his bed-wetting. Pappu's elder brother Kishore plans to watch a porno with his friends in his room. Pappu insists on joining them. When Kishore refuses and gets rid of him, Pappu cuts off the power out of anger, creating a short circuit at home. Indira scolds Pappu and shouts at her husband for not stopping with one child. Distraught, Pappu leaves to end his life near a river, but is stopped by a man who takes him to his home. The man is a scientist who has his own laboratory. He convinces Pappu to take a medicine invented by him which will transform a boy into a fully-grown man. Pappu agrees and turns into a young man. However, he still has the mind of a child. The only person other than the scientist who knows the truth is Pappu's classmate and friend, Deepak.

Now an adult, Pappu goes for an interview in a toy manufacturing company under the name of Vichu. The owner interviewing him demands that he empathise with children to understand their taste. Since Vichu is a child, he gets the job easily. He meets the owner's daughter Priya, whom Vichu helped to her feet at an amusement park earlier. The two fall in love. Their intimacy makes Raj, another employee enamored with Priya, jealous. Vichu eventually learns that his mother is depressed and sick following Pappu's disappearance. She laments for being so strict with him. After learning of her love for him, Vichu asks the scientist to revert him to his eight-year-old self. The scientist transforms Vichu into Pappu, who reconciles with his mother. However, at night, he turns back to Vichu, and rushes to the scientist, who does not know what went wrong.

Pappu now lives as an eight-year-old boy during daytime and as a 28-year-old Vichu during the night. Priya expresses her love to him. Vichu tells her to love a man suitable for her age, but he reciprocates her love upon the scientist's coercion. One day, Priya asks him to accompany her to a matinee show, to which he rejects so she does not find out what is actually going on. Pappu's mother befriends Priya as they are neighbours. Priya likes Pappu, but is angered by Vichu's absence. After angrily hitting Vichu, she decides to marry him. Raj gets Vichu kidnapped on the day of marriage, but he changes to Pappu during the day. The kidnappers release him, thinking that they kidnapped a child by mistake. Pappu turns into Vichu and marries Priya that evening. Priya longs for a child, so they eventually have sex, which results in her becoming pregnant. Vichu/Pappu meets his mother and understands the difficulties of pregnancy, prompting him to take care of Priya with more affection.

Deepak demands ice cream but Vichu refuses, having a tight schedule as a son, employee, and husband. Deepak gets angry and reveals to Priya that Vichu is Pappu. She is shocked that she is bearing the baby of a child. Priya blames Pappu for ruining her life and making her pregnant, during which he transforms to Vichu. He gets angry and blames her for everything. He reveals that he started to love her when she got pregnant and saw his mother in her. Priya goes into labour and Vichu takes her to the hospital. En route, Vichu is stopped by Raj and his men, who seek revenge. Vichu fights them and admits her in a hospital. There, everyone learns the truth about Pappu, and Priya gives birth to his son while being upset on her fate of being a child's wife.

Twenty years pass later, Pappu is an actual 28-year-old. He still is Priya's husband. He goes inside his room as a young man and comes out as the 48-year-old Vichu. His son is a 20-year-old who looks like him. Vichu contacts the scientist to see if he found a remedy for his transformation. The scientist replies that he did not.

== Cast ==
- S. J. Suryah in a dual role as
  - Pappu (Viswanath alias Vichu)
    - Master Parth Dave as Pappu (child)
  - Pappu's son (cameo appearance)
- Simran as Priya
- Kiran Rathod as Sivagami
- Devayani as Indira, Pappu's mother
- Aishwarya as Seema, Priya's friend
- Nassar as Priya's father
- Manivannan as Scientist aka Science
- Karunas as Vishwanath aka X
- Janagaraj as Doctor
- Brahmanandam as Sathyam
- Ali as Siruthai
- Master Akhilesh as Deepak, Pappu's classmate friend
- Rajkumar as Raj, Sathyam's son
- Sanjay Swaroop as Pappu's father
- Madhan Bob as income tax officer
- Dharmavarapu Subramanyam as police officer
- Junior Relangi as police officer
- Ravi Mariya as math professor (cameo appearance)

== Production ==
Suryah began pre-production work on a third story titled New in early 2001, which he would also produce. Starring Ajith Kumar and Jyothika, composer Deva had composed ten songs for the film by June 2001. After Ajith Kumar had become busy with other commitments, Suryah decided to enact the lead role himself, revealing he had always wanted to be an actor. Simran took over as the lead actress, while Kiran and Devayani were cast in pivotal roles. A simultaneously shot Telugu version titled Naani featuring Mahesh Babu in the lead role was also made after Suryah felt that Babu would suit the character, and the Telugu version helped with finances. Suryah noted that he was loosely inspired by the American film Big (1988). The film was shot in hundred days, with Suryah revealing he would often stop acting in between the scenes, when he knew that his performance was not up to his expectation as a director. Suryah noted that script-writing began in 2001, while production with the final cast began in 2002.

== Soundtrack ==
The soundtrack was composed by A. R. Rahman, with lyrics by Vaalee for all songs, except "Spiderman" written by Vairamuthu, the rap portion lyrics for the songs "New New" & "If You Wanna" were written by Blaaze. In an interview in 2001, Suryah stated that Deva had composed ten songs for the film, but he was later replaced by Rahman. The song "Thottal Poo Malarum" reuses lyrics from the song of the same name from Padagotti (1964), but the tune is completely new, which is composed by A. R. Rahman. The audio was launched at Albert Theatre in Chennai.

All music is composed by A. R. Rahman.

Track listing
No.	Title	Lyrics	Singer(s)	Length
1.	"New New" (Rap lyrics:Blaaze)	Vaalee	Blaaze, Sunitha Sarathy, Vijay Prakash, Karthik	4:33
2.	"Sakkara Innikara"	Vaalee	S. P. Balasubrahmanyam, Sujatha Mohan	5:53
3.	"If You Wanna" (Rap lyrics:Blaaze)	Vaalee	Chinmayi, Anupama, Aparna	4:18
4.	"Kalayil Dhinamum"	Vaalee	Unnikrishnan, Sadhana Sargam	4:24
5.	"Thottal Poo Malarum"	Vaalee	Hariharan, Harini	5:34
6.	"Markandeya"	Vaalee	Nithyasree Mahadevan, Manikka Vinayagam	6:12
7.	"Spiderman"	Vairamuthu	Kunal Ganjawala, Sadhana Sargam	5:59
Total length:				36:54

== Critical reception ==
Malathi Rangarajan from The Hindu claimed that "belonging to a genre that is rare to our cinema, "New" however, gets bogged down in a mire of duets and double entenders", but hinted at potential success citing that director "seems to have hit the bull's eye." Visual Dasan of Kalki gave a negative review, criticising Suryah for ruining Big by adding vulgarity on the pretext of mother sentiment, while stating that Penny Marshall, the director of Big, would cry like M. R. Radha by seeing this adaptation. Malini Mannath of Chennai Online wrote that "It's director Suriyah's third directorial venture after his highly successful 'Vali' and 'Khushi'. Wonder what made him rehash Big for his debut 'heroic' misadventure!" G. Ulaganathan of Deccan Herald wrote, "The director (Suryah himself) has included the mother-son sentiment but Devayani as the mother is unable to portray a mother’s role to perfection. The film is full of double-meaning dialogues. Music by A R Rahman is nothing new and only one song — a remix of an old MGR number — is interesting. Cinematographer Guhan uses too many close-ups and it is irritating to say the least". The film grossed ₹1.12 crore from 120 screens on Day 1.

== Controversies ==
The film's adult theme generated controversy, and women activists in the state of Tamil Nadu demanded a ban on a film after release, which they say contained obscene scenes. Suryah responded by claiming that the scenes are there because the storyline requires them and described his film as "fiction laced with adult comedy".

In August 2005, the Madras High Court revoked the film's censor certificate and directed the Chennai Commissioner of Police to investigate two criminal complaints registered against Suryah. They ruled that the film did not provide a "clean and healthy entertainment" and that it would be failing in its duty if it did not revoke the censor certificate, claiming it originally attained an "A" (adults only) certificate under "questionable circumstances". Suryah was arrested by city police on 22 August 2005 in connection with allegedly throwing a mobile phone at a woman censor board official in a fit of anger during the post-production of the film. According to the complainant, Vanathi Srinivasan, Suryah was denied permission to add the "Kumbakonam" song to the film due to excessively obscene scenes and as a result he allegedly threw a mobile phone at her. He was later released without charge.

In 2017, the Supreme Court ruled that the Madras High Court was wrong to order the revocation of the film's certification. The Supreme Court mentioned that "It is not for judges to make "piecemeal analysis" of a movie and apply their subjective views of life to revoke the censor certification issued to a film".
