= Simran (actress) =

Indian actress and film producer (b.1976)

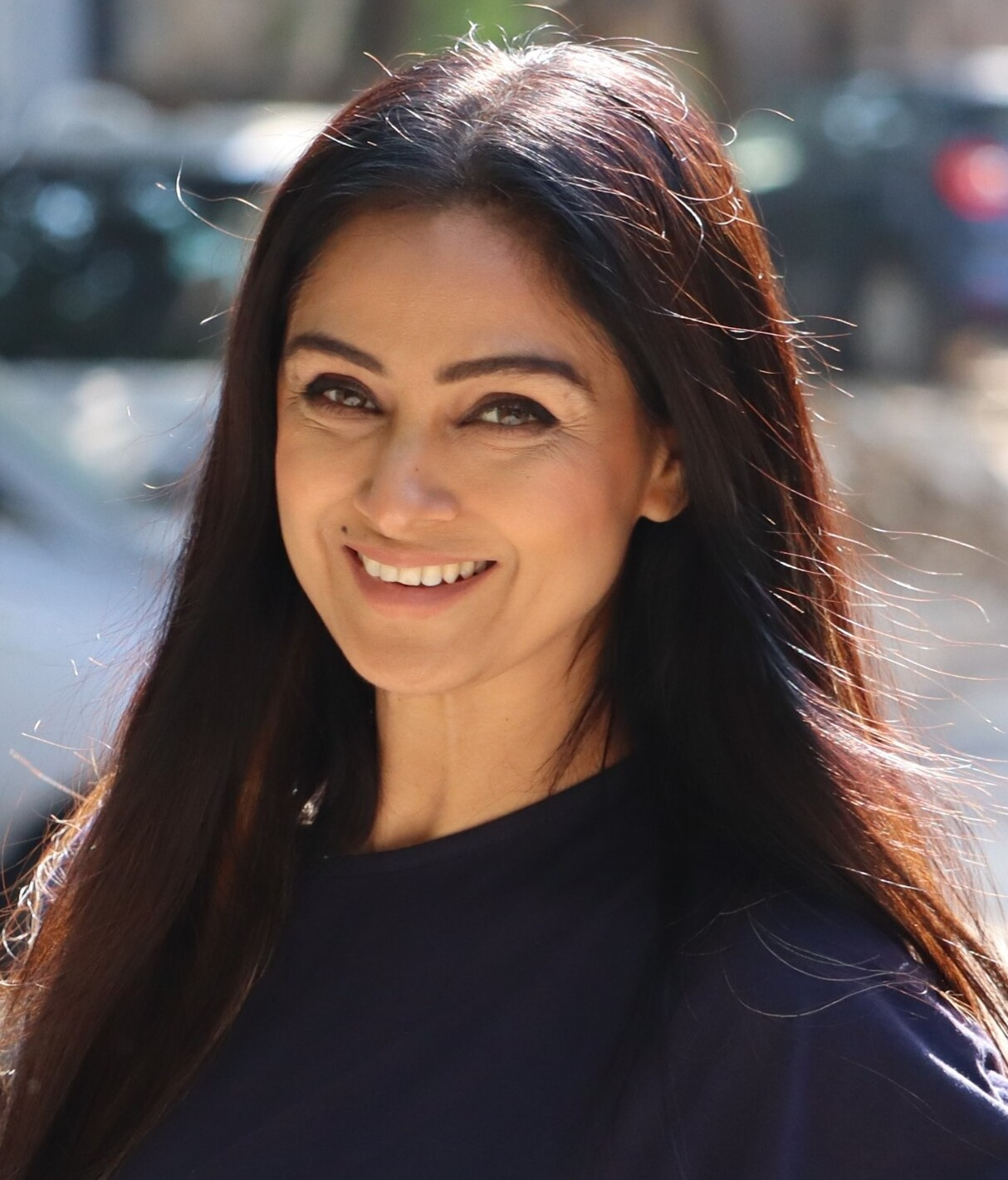
- Simran in 2023
- Born: Rishibala Naval; 4 April 1976 (age 50); Mumbai, Maharashtra, India
- Occupations: Actress; film producer; choreographer; playback singer
- Years active: 1995‍–‍present
- Works: Full list
- Spouse: Deepak Bagga (m. 2003)
- Children: 2
- Relatives: Monal Naval (sister)
- Awards: Full list
- Website: simran.actor

Rishibala Naval (born 4 April 1976), known professionally as Simran, is an Indian actress, who predominantly works in Tamil and Telugu films whilst also appearing in Hindi, Kannada and Malayalam films. She is the recipient of numerous accolades including three Filmfare Awards South and one Tamil Nadu State Film Award.

Simran debuted in Tamil films in 1997, with two successful films Once More and V.I.P., which earned her Filmfare Award for Best Female Debut – South. She won the Filmfare Award for Best Actress – Tamil for Kannathil Muthamittal (2002) and Best Supporting Actress – Tamil for Vaaranam Aayiram (2008). Following a career hiatus, Simran returned to screens in 2014.

== Early life and family ==
Simran was born as Rishibala Naval to Punjabi parents in Mumbai, Maharashtra. She was educated at St. Anthony's High School in Versova, Mumbai. She had two sisters who were also actors, Monal (died 2002) and Jyoti. Simran married Deepak Bagga in 2003, and they have two sons.

== Career ==
=== Debut and breakthrough (1995–1999) ===
When Naval began her film career, Saawan Kumar Tak gave her the stage name Simran as he felt the name Rishibala sounded masculine. She made her debut in the 1995 film Sanam Harjai, the first Indian film to be shot in New Zealand. As a presenter on musical show Superhit Muqabla she was noticed by Jaya Bachchan, who cast her in ABCL's Tere Mere Sapne, in which she received praise for her performance in the song "Aankh Maarey". She made her debut in Malayalam cinema with 1996's Indraprastham, a movie that was unsuccessful but for which Simran received praise for her performance. In 1997, she made her Telugu and Kannada debuts in Abbai Gari Pelli and Simhada Mari, respectively.

In 1997 Simran also made her Tamil debut, and rose to stardom with Once More, V.I.P. and another release, Nerrukku Ner. Her success in those films focused her career on the Tamil film industry. Simran's performance in the film Thullatha Manamum Thullum would garner her the Tamil Nadu State Film Award for Best Actress. Her performance in Vaalee won her the Cinema Express Award for Best Actress – Tamil.

=== Continued success (2000–2004) ===
In 2000, Simran starred in the Telugu film Kalisundam Raa. The acclaim led to her establishing more of a presence in the Telugu film industry. In Nuvvu Vasthavani, a Telugu remake of Thullatha Manamum Thullum in which Simran had starred, Simran reprised her role as the female lead. Simran was also seen in Hindi films such as Khauff at this time. In 2001, Narasimha Naidu in particular received a lot of commercial and critical acclaim. While the films Yuvaraju and Seema Simham were unsuccessful, Daddy was a commercial success.

Throughout this period Simran continued a prolific career in the Tamil film industry. She was seen in Unnai Kodu Ennai Tharuven, 12B, and Paarthale Paravasam. though Simran's performance was praised. Her most notable film in this period was the Tamil-language Kannathil Muthamittal. Priyamaanavale, Pammal K. Sambandam, Panchatanthiram and Arasu were all notable commercial successes. I Love You Da and Udhaya were also the rare releases that were unsuccessful during this period.

=== Focus on television (2005–2013) ===
After being seen in 74 films in the ten years since her debut, Simran became more selective in the projects that she pursued.

Several of Simran's Tamil projects were unsuccessful during this period including Kicha Vayasu 16 (2005), Seval (2008) and Ainthaam Padai (2009).

However, Vaaranam Aayiram received widespread critical and commercial acclaim.

She continued her career in Telugu with roles in Okka Magaadu and John Appa Rao 40 Plus. She was also seen in the Malayalam release Heart Beats.

During this period she pivoted to focus more on television. She acted in the eponymously titled Jaya TV serial Simran Thirai. She starred in the Telugu soap opera Sundarakanda. During this time she also started working on reality TV shows and game shows. She was a judge on Super Super, and in 2011 took over the anchor role on the long-running Jaya TV show Jackpot. Between 2013 and 2014 she starred in Agni Paravai, a Tamil-language soap opera.

Simran also ventured into production. She and her husband produced Dance Tamizha Dance, a Tamil show for Zee Tamizh, in which she was also a judge. They followed it up with a second production, Dance Tamizha Dance Little Masters, focused on under-14 performers from Tamil Nadu, with Simran continuing as a judge.

=== Career expansion (2014–present) ===
Simran returned to the big screen with a series of unsuccessful films such as Aaha Kalyanam (the Tamil remake of Band Baaja Baaraat) in 2014, Trisha Illana Nayanthara (2015) and Koditta Idangalai Nirappuga (2017). She was widely believed to have made her comeback with 2018's Seemaraja. She followed it up with Petta, which received critical and commercial acclaim. She continued working as a producer, producing and starring in a Hindi music video.

In 2020 she made her streaming debut with Netflix's first Tamil film, Paava Kadhaigal, receiving positive reviews. This was followed up with Mahaan which debuted on Amazon Prime Video after the pandemic meant that a theater release wouldn't be possible.

Simran reunited with R. Madhavan in Rocketry: The Nambi Effect (2022). It was filmed simultaneously in Tamil, Hindi and English languages.

Simran then appeared in the Tamil science fiction action film Captain. And later starred in the Hindi language Gulmohar (2023). She then appeared as the Prime Minister of Pakistan in Tiger 3 (2023). She made a special appearance in a devotional song in Aranmanai 4 (2024). After sharing the screen with Prashanth as the female lead, Simran starred as an antagonist in the Andhadhun remake, Andhagan (2024).

In 2025, Simran appeared as a Sri Lankan Tamil refugee in Abhishan Jeevinth's debut directorial, Tourist Family, opposite M. Sasikumar. While her performance was appraised by critics and audience, the film went on to become India's most profitable film of the year. Her next release, Sabdham was a thriller directed by Arivazhagan Venkatachalam was also a hit at the box office.

== Media image ==
From 1998 to 2004, Simran became "one of Tamil cinema's top female draws", with several successful films. Throughout her career, Simran has endorsed several brands and products such as Fanta, Jeeva soap, Kurkure, Sugar Free Gold by Cadila Healthcare, General Mills' Pillsbury Atta, Dabur, Enfagrow A+, Pothys’ silk sarees, Arun Ice Cream, Nac Jewelers, CavinKare's Chinni Masala, Lion Dates, Manna Go Grains, Sunfeast Supermilk, Swiggy's Instamart and Regal Jewellers.

== Accolades ==
Simran has received three Filmfare Awards South awards, out of the four nominations: Best Female Debut for Nerrukku Ner, Once More, and V.I.P., Best Actress – Tamil for Kannathil Muthamittal and Best Supporting Actress – Tamil for Vaaranam Aayiram.
