= R. T. Neason =

Indian film director

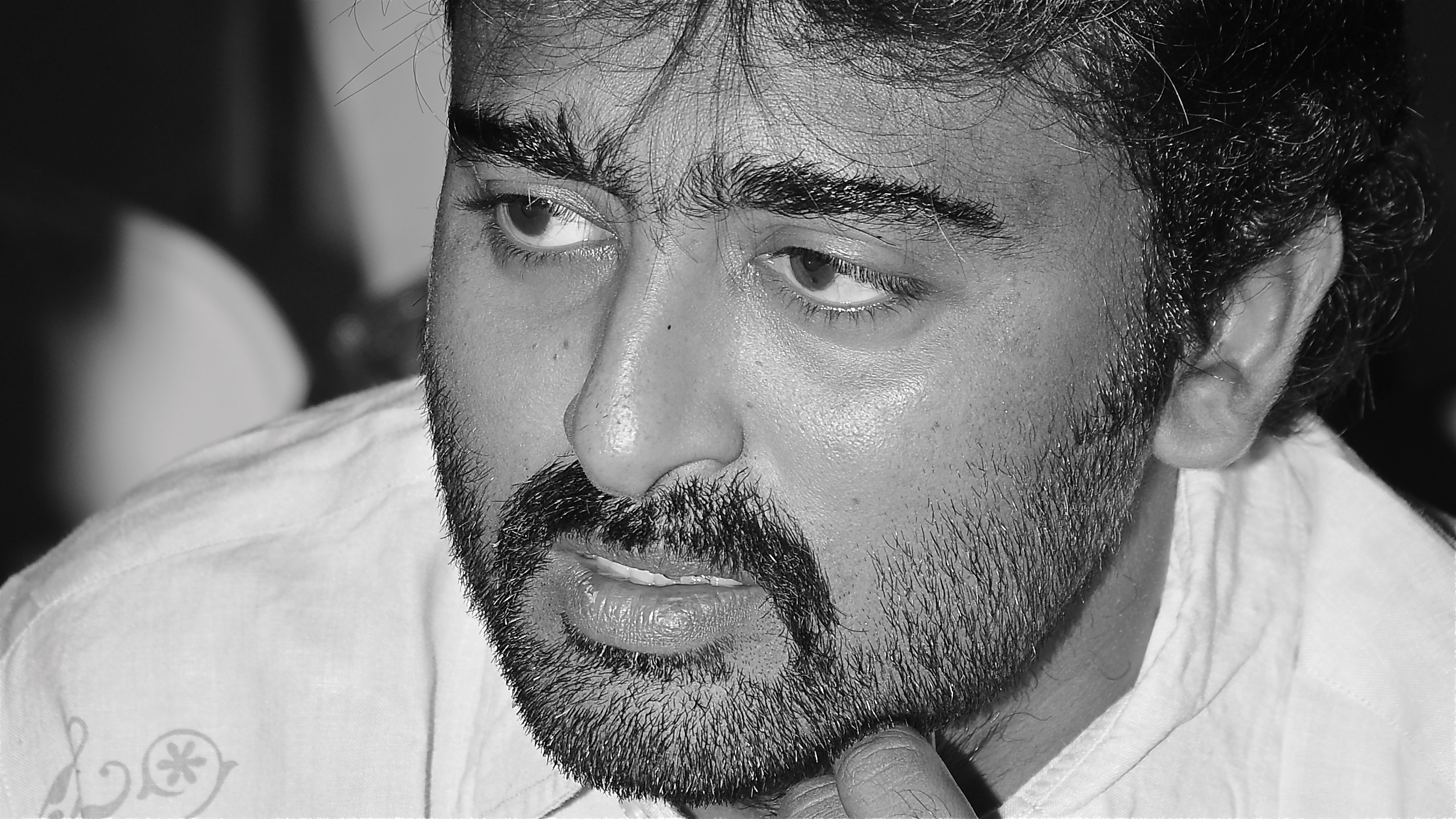
- Born: Bodinayakkanur, Tamil Nadu, India
- Occupation: Film director
- Years active: 1998–2014
- Spouse: Lakshmi
- Children: 2

R. T. Neason is an Indian film director, he earlier worked as assistant director in film like Iraniyan, Prematho Raa, Thavasi, Ondagona Baa and also with Director Bhagyaraj as a screenplay writer. Neason also assisted in story and screenplay of Velayudham.

== Personal life ==
R. T. Neason born in Bodinayakkanur, Tamil Nadu. He did his schooling in Sainik School Amaravathinagar, Tamil Nadu, India. He is married to Lakshmi. They have two Daughters Adithi and Akshara. He completed his Bachelor of Commerce from Madras University, studied in Film and Television Institute of Madras with direction and screenplay specialization.

He worked as assistant director with Vincent Selva and Udayasankar for films like Iraniyan, Prematho Raa, Thavasi, Ondagona Baa.

== Film career ==
Neason started his directorial career with Muruga (film) in 2007, starring Ashok, Shruti Sharma, Samiksha, Vadivelu and others. The film had music by Karthik Raja released to positive reviews on 7 March 2007 and was an average film.

His second release Jilla features Mohanlal, Vijay, Kajal Aggarwal in the lead roles while Niveda Thomas portraying supporting roles. The film was released on 10 January 2014, coinciding with Pongal and clashing with Ajith Kumar's Veeram.

Neason has two films to his arsenal as of date and has not worked on any films since Jilla.

== Filmography ==
Year	Film	Credited as		Language	Notes
Year	Film	Director	Writer	Language	Notes
2007	Muruga	✓	✓	Tamil	
2011	Velayudham	✗	✓	Tamil	
2014	Jilla	✓	✓	Tamil	
