= T. Trivikrama Rao =

Indian film producer

- Born: Palakonda, Srikakulam district, Andhra Pradesh, India
- Died: 3 December 2008; Hyderabad
- Occupation: film producer

T. Trivikrama Rao was an Indian film producer known for his work in Telugu cinema. He produced several successful films under the banner of Vijayalakshmi Art Pictures. Some of the notable films he produced include Justice Chowdary (1982), Gudachari No. 1 (1983), Donga (1985), Kondaveeti Donga (1990), Jamai Raja (1990), Rowdy Inspector (1992), Bobbili Simham (1994), Sarada Bullodu (1996), Aahwanam (1997), and Badri (2000). He worked with prominent actors such as N. T. Rama Rao, Krishna, Krishnam Raju, Chiranjeevi, Balakrishna, Venkatesh, and Pawan Kalyan.

== Early life ==
Trivikrama Rao was born in Palakonda of Srikakulam district in Andhra Pradesh. He had three daughters and a son.

== Career ==
Trivikrama Rao made successful films with lead actors like N. T. Rama Rao, Krishna, Krishnam Raju, Chiranjeevi, Balakrishna, Venkatesh, and Pawan Kalyan.

He was instrumental in introducing director Puri Jagannadh to the film industry with the movie Badri (2000). Noticing Puri's speed and efficiency during the production of the film, Trivikrama Rao predicted that he would go on to make fifty films, a statement Puri often recalls.

On December 3, 2008, Trivikrama Rao died due to a heart attack at a private hospital in Hyderabad.

== Filmography ==
Year	Title	Cast	Director	Notes	ref
1976	Monagadu	Sobhan Babu, Jayasudha, Manjula Vijayakumar	T. Krishna		
1979	Bangaru Chellalu	Sobhan Babu, Jayasudha, Sridevi, Murali Mohan	B. Subba Rao		
1980	Gharana Donga	Krishna, Sridevi	K. Raghavendra Rao		
1981	Ragile Jwala	Krishnam Raju, Sujatha, Jaya Prada	K. Raghavendra Rao		
1982	Justice Chowdary	N. T. Rama Rao, Sridevi	K. Raghavendra Rao		
1983	Gudachari No.1	Chiranjeevi, Radhika	Kodi Ramakrishna		
1984	Yuddham	Krishna, Krishnam Raju, Jaya Prada, Jayasudha	Dasari Narayana Rao		
1985	Donga	Chiranjeevi, Radha	A. Kodandarami Reddy		
1988	Waqt Ki Awaz	Sridevi, Mithun Chakraborty, Gulshan Grover, Kader Khan	K. Bapayya	Hindi Movie	
1990	Kondaveeti Donga	Chiranjeevi, Radha, Vijayashanti, Sharada	A. Kodandarami Reddy		
1990	Jamai Raja	Anil Kapoor, Madhuri Dixit, Hema Malini	A. Kodandarami Reddy	Hindi Movie	
1992	Rowdy Inspector	Nandamuri Balakrishna, Vijayashanti	B. Gopal		
1994	Bobbili Simham	Nandamuri Balakrishna, Meena, Roja	A. Kodandarami Reddy		
1996	Sarada Bullodu	Venkatesh, Nagma	Ravi Raja Pinisetty		
1997	Aahvaanam	Meka Srikanth, Ramya Krishnan, Heera Rajagopal	S. V. Krishna Reddy		
2000	Badri	Pawan Kalyan, Amisha Patel, Renu Desai	Puri Jagannadh		
2001	Prematho Raa	Venkatesh, Simran	Udayasankar		

== Death ==
Trivikrama Rao died because of cardiac arrest on 3 December 2008 in a private hospital in Hyderabad.
