= Vijayalakshmi Art Pictures =

- Native name: విజయలక్ష్మీ ఆర్ట్ పిక్చర్స్
- Industry: Entertainment
- Founded: Trivikrama Rao T
- Headquarters: Hyderabad, India
- Key people: Trivikrama Rao T
- Products: Films
- Owner: Trivikrama Rao T

Vijayalakshmi Art Pictures was an Indian film production company owned by producer T. Trivikrama Rao.

== Film production ==
Year	Title	Cast	Director	Notes	Ref
1976	Monagadu	Sobhan Babu, Jayasudha, Manjula Vijayakumar	T. Krishna		
1979	Bangaru Chellalu	Sobhan Babu, Jayasudha, Sridevi, Murali Mohan	B. Subba Rao		
1980	Gharana Donga	Krishna, Sridevi	K. Raghavendra Rao		
1981	Ragile Jwala	Krishnam Raju, Sujatha, Jaya Prada	K. Raghavendra Rao		
1982	Justice Chowdary	N. T. Rama Rao, Sridevi	K. Raghavendra Rao		
1983	Gudachari No.1	Chiranjeevi, Radhika	Kodi Ramakrishna		
1984	Yuddham	Krishna, Krishnam Raju, Jayaprada, Jayasudha	Dasari Narayana Rao		
1985	Donga	Chiranjeevi, Radha	A. Kodandarami Reddy		
1988	Waqt Ki Awaz	Sridevi, Mithun Chakraborty, Gulshan Grover, Kader Khan	K. Bapayya	Hindi Movie	
1990	Kondaveeti Donga	Chiranjeevi, Radha, Vijayashanti, Sarada	A. Kodandarami Reddy		
1990	Jamai Raja	Anil Kapoor, Madhuri Dixit, Hema Malini	A. Kodandarami Reddy	Hindi Movie	
1992	Rowdy Inspector	Nandamuri Balakrishna, Vijayashanti	B. Gopal		
1994	Bobbili Simham	Nandamuri Balakrishna, Meena, Roja	A. Kodandarami Reddy		
1996	Sarada Bullodu	Venkatesh, Nagma	Ravi Raja Pinisetty		
1997	Aahvaanam	Srikanth, Ramya Krishna, Heera	S. V. Krishna Reddy		
2000	Badri	Pawan Kalyan, Amisha Patel, Renu Desai	Puri Jagannadh		
2001	Prematho Raa	Venkatesh, Simran	Udayasankar		
