= Dariya Dil =

1988 film by K. Ravi Shankar

- Promotional poster
- Directed by: K. Ravi Shankar
- Written by: Gyandev Agnihotri; Amrit Aryan; Kader Khan
- Produced by: Vimal Kumar; Manisha Vimal Kumar; M Sagar
- Starring: Govinda; Kimi Katkar; Roshni; Raj Kiran
- Cinematography: K.V. Ramanna
- Edited by: Prakash Dave
- Music by: Rajesh Roshan
- Distributed by: Shivam Chitrya
- Release date: 8 January 1988 (India)
- Running time: 146 minutes
- Country: India
- Language: Hindi

Dariya Dil (translated as Generous Heart) is a 1988 Hindi-language Indian drama film directed by K. Ravi Shankar, starring Govinda, Kimi Katkar, Roshni and Raj Kiran. released on 8 January 1988 in India.

== Plot ==
Chided by his family for being the absolute miser, wealthy industrialist Dhaniram loves his money as a mother loves a child. This does not auger well with his two sons, Ajay and Vijay. The two sons despise their father and find various ways to entrap him, but in vain. Dhaniram gets in the bad books of Income Tax Officer, D.O. Gogi, and as a result Gogi is arrested and imprisoned. His sister, Dolly and brother, Gulu both scheme a devious plot that will ensure the death of Dhaniram, and the control of his wealth will rest with them and Gogi. His third son Ravi makes everything correct.

== Cast ==
- Govinda as Ravi Kumar/Superman
- Kimi Katkar as Radha /Spiderwoman
- Roshni as Dolly Gogi
- Raj Kiran as Vijay Kumar
- Shoma Anand as Sapna Kumar
- G. Asrani as Abdul Dawood Suleiman (as Asrani)
- Gulshan Grover as Gulu Gogi
- Seema Deo as Laxmi Kumar
- Shashi Puri as Ajay Kumar
- Shakti Kapoor as D.O. Gogi
- Kader Khan as Dhaniram/Maniram (as Kadar Khan)
- Renu Joshi
- Ashok Saxena
- Farita Boyce
- Jugnu (as Jugune)
- Vinod Tripathi
- Jayshree T. as Mrs. Maniram
- Yunus Parvez as Saxena
- Raja Duggal as Suresh
- Mushtaq Merchant
- Vikas Anand as Mohan Joshi, Radha's brother
- Bharat Bhushan as Beggar Ramnath

== Soundtrack ==
| # | Title | Singer(s) | Lyric |
|---|---|---|---|
| 1 | "Barse Re Sawan" | Mohammed Aziz, Sadhana Sargam and Chorus | Indeevar |
| 2 | "Patthar Kya Marte Ho" | Mohammed Aziz, Sapna Mukherjee and Chorus | Indeevar |
| 3 | "Dariya Dil" (Title) | Shabbir Kumar and Chorus | Indeevar |
| 4 | "Tu Mera Superman" | Mohammed Aziz, Sadhana Sargam, and Chorus | Indeevar |
| 5 | "Woh Kehte Hain Hum Se" | Nitin Mukesh | Vitthalbhai Patel |
| 6 | "Dariya Dil" (Sad) | Shabbir Kumar | Indeevar |
