= Muruga (film) =

- Poster
- Directed by: R. T. Neason
- Written by: R. T. Neason
- Produced by: Ram Senthil
- Starring: Ashok; Shruti Sharma; Vadivelu
- Cinematography: Padmesh
- Music by: Karthik Raja
- Production company: Cocktail Dream Productions
- Release date: 7 March 2007
- Country: India
- Language: Tamil

Muruga is a 2007 Indian Tamil language film written and directed by R. T. Neason, starring Ashok, Shruti Sharma and Vadivelu. The story, screenplay and dialogues are by Neason, who has worked as an assistant to Udayasankar and Vincent Selva. The music is by Karthik Raja.

== Plot ==
Murugan (Ashok) falls in love with his schoolmate Amudha (Shruti Sharma), a rich girl who does not love him in return. When the news of Murugan's love reaches her family, Amudha's uncle Selvam (Riyaz Khan) tries to kill him, ultimately banishing Murugan and his mother from the village. Saddened, Murugan goes to Chennai and ends up with a job as a delivery boy. Having given up all hope of ever seeing Amutha again, he bumps into her when making a delivery at a medical college. Forgetting the past and her family's issues, the two become good friends, and this friendship develops into love. After completing her studies, Amutha returns to the village, only to discover that wedding preparations are underway as her parents had arranged for her to marry Selvam. Finally, Murugan and Amudha succeed in getting married with Amudha's father's blessings.

== Cast ==
- Ashok as Murugan
- Shruti Sharma as Amudha
- Vadivelu as "Courier" Gopu
- Riyaz Khan as Selvam
- Mahadevan as Vinayaka Murthy
- Chitra Shenoy as Amudha's mother
- Manobala
- Vincent Asokan as Police inspector
- Pandi
- R. Thyagarajan
- Singamuthu
- Bava Lakshmanan
- Sakthivel
- Samiksha Singh as an item number

== Production ==
The film saw the debut of Nesan as director, Padmesh as cinematographer and Ramji Senthil as producer. Chaya Singh was originally part of the cast but eventually did not feature.

== Soundtrack ==
The film's soundtrack was composed by Karthik Raja. Saraswathy Srinivas of Rediff.com wrote, "Overall, in this album Karthik Raja follows the beaten track, offering up routine stuff".

Lyrics written by Na. Muthukumar.

1. "Kuthuna" by Shankar Mahadevan
2. "En Kathali" by Karthik
3. "Chinnanchiru Chitte" by Vineeth Srinivasan and Sangeetha Rajeshwaran
4. "Melathe Kottu" by Tippu, Sujatha and Malgudi Subha
5. "Pollatha Kirukku" by Udit Narayan and Shreya Ghosal

== Reception ==
Malini Mannath of Chennai Online wrote "The film, by first-timer Nesan (apprenticed under directors like Vincent Selva), perks up at times but falls flat at others, slipping into predictable lines." Lajjavathi of Kalki wrote that the film, which should have been powerful enough for the powerful title Muruga, missed somewhere.
