= Kuch Tum Kaho Kuch Hum Kahein =

2001 film by K. Ravi Shankar

Kuchh Tum Kaho Kuchh Hum Kahein
- Directed by: K. Ravi Shankar
- Written by: Paruchuri brothers Jainendra Jain (dialogues)
- Story by: K. R. Udhayashankar
- Based on: Kalisundam Raa
- Produced by: D. Ramanaidu
- Starring: Fardeen Khan; Richa Pallod
- Cinematography: Ajayan Vincent
- Edited by: Marthand K. Venkatesh
- Music by: Anu Malik
- Production company: Suresh Productions
- Distributed by: Dream Merchants Enterprise
- Release date: 28 June 2002
- Country: India
- Language: Hindi

Kuch Tum Kaho Kuch Hum Kahein (transl. You Say Something, I'll Say Something) is a 2002 Indian Hindi-language romantic drama film directed by K. Ravi Shankar. The film stars Fardeen Khan and Richa Pallod, in her debut as a lead actress. It was released on 28 June 2002, and opened to mixed reviews from critics. The story of the film is based on two lovers who are unable to be together due to their family's feud and ancient grudge. It is a remake of the Telugu film Kalisundam Raa which has similarities with William Shakespeare's, Romeo and Juliet.

== Plot ==
Vishnu Pratap Singh is celebrating his 60th anniversary in his village with his wife. At the behest of his wife, Vishnu Pratap calls his estranged son's family from Bombay for the event. Their grandson, Abhay, arrives with his mother and sister to the village and is initially greeted with animosity. However, he shows a kind and caring side that wins the affections of his family members. He also starts to become friendly with Mangala, the granddaughter of Vishnu Pratap's friend, who lives with the family. The two start playing pranks and teasing each other, which eventually leads to them falling in love. Abhay ends up getting into a fight with the family of Virendra Pratap, specifically his nephew, Rudra Pratap. Vishnu Pratap slaps Abhay for his actions even though he was defending himself against Rudra.

Abhay finds out Rudra's jealousy towards his family is a deep-rooted family feud. Virendra Pratap and Vishnu Pratap are brothers-in-law who were once close friends. 25 years before, they decided that Abhay's father, Indra, would marry Virendra Pratap's niece, Amrita. However, Indra was in love with Abhay's mother and ran away on the day of the wedding to avoid the marriage. Amrita, despondent over her humiliation, committed suicide that day; Virendra Pratap's son-in-law and brother also died as a result of the fight that broke out at the wedding. Vishnu Pratap blames his son for the discord within the family and shuns him and his children as a result. Abhay, hearing this, resolves to reunite the two families somehow. Rudra, however, is determined to kill Abhay and his family to avenge the deaths of his sister and father.

Abhay eventually succeeds and decides to ask his grandfather for permission to marry Mangala. However, Mangala's marriage is arranged with Virendra Pratap's grandson to reunite the families permanently. Abhay sacrifices his love for Mangala. However, Mangala refuses to agree and runs away; Abhay tries to stop her from leaving for the sake of their families. The families eventually find out about Mangala running away, and Rudra goes after her, intending to kill Abhay. The two get into a fight, until Rudra stabs Abhay. At that point, Vishnu Pratap and Virendra Pratap show up with the family after finding out about Abhay and Mangala's love and realizing the mistake they've made. Rudra also comes to realize his mistake and reunites Abhay and Mangala as the families finally reconcile.

== Cast ==
- Fardeen Khan as Abhayendra "Abhay" Vishnu Pratap Singh
- Richa Pallod as Mangala Jaikumar Solanki
- Farida Jalal as Mangala Dadi
- Vikram Gokhale as Vishnu Pratap Singh
- Sharad Kapoor as Rudra Pratap Singh
- Govind Namdev as Virendra Pratap Singh
- Rameshwari as Shanti
- Sai Lokur as Deepa, Abhayendra's sister
- Ashok Saraf as Govind
- Madan Jain as Jaikumar Solanki, Mangala father
- Sheela David as Naina Solanki, Mangala mother
- Nina Kulkarni as Virendra Pratap's wife and Vishnu's sister
- Harish Patel as Gajju
- Mukesh Tiwari as Narendra Pratap Singh
- Payal Nair as Amrita, Narendra Pratap Singh's daughter
- Raghuvir Yadav as Chaturvedi
- Dinesh Hingoo as Lawyer Shivprasad
- Sanjai Mishra as Police Constable
- Baby Zeeba Ansari as Pinky

== Soundtrack ==
Kuch Tum Kaho Kuch Hum Kahein

Soundtrack album by Anu Malik
- Released: 2002
- Genre: Feature film soundtrack
- Label: Tips Music

Anu Malik composed the film's music with lyrics written by Sameer.

Title	Singer(s)
"Aa Ra Raa Ra Raa"	Fardeen Khan, Sonu Nigam
"Chudi Chudi"	Shaan, Preeti & Pinky, Prashant Samaddar
"Hua Salaam Dil Ka"	Udit Narayan, Alka Yagnik
"Jab Se Dekha Tumko"	Kumar Sanu, Alka Yagnik
"Kuch Tum Kaho Kuch Hum Kahein"	Hariharan
"Tu Hi Hai"	Shaan, Sunidhi Chauhan
"Yeh Kya Majboori"	K.K., Prashant Samaddar
