= Jilla =

2014 Indian film by R. T. Neason

- Theatrical release poster
- Directed by: R. T. Neason
- Written by: R. T. Neason; N. Baskaran (Dialogues)
- Produced by: R. B. Choudary
- Starring: Mohanlal; Vijay; Kajal Aggarwal
- Cinematography: Ganesh Rajavelu
- Edited by: Don Max
- Music by: D. Imman
- Production company: Super Good Films
- Distributed by: Maxlab Entertainments; Ayngaran International
- Release dates: 9 January 2014 (France, Singapore and Canada); 10 January 2014 (Worldwide)
- Running time: 176 minutes
- Country: India
- Language: Tamil
- Budget: ₹50 crore
- Box office: ₹85 crore

Jilla (transl. District) is a 2014 Indian Tamil-language action drama film directed by R. T. Neason and produced by R. B. Choudary under Super Good Films. The film stars Mohanlal and Vijay in the lead roles as a crime boss and his adopted son, a police officer whose lives and approach towards law change after a violent incident. The cast also includes Kajal Aggarwal, Soori, Mahat, Nivetha Thomas, Sampath Raj and Pradeep Rawat. The film has music composed by D. Imman, cinematography handled by Ganesh Rajavelu and editing by Don Max.

The film released on 10 January 2014 and received generally positive reviews from critics and audience. Jilla completed a 100-day theatrical run on 19 April 2014. The film was remade in Odia as Bajrangi (2017).

== Plot ==
Shakthi is the adopted son of a Madurai-based crime boss, Sivan and is also his right-hand man, bodyguard and driver. Sivan lives happily with his wife, Parvati, Shakthi, his son, Vignesh, and his daughter, Mahalakshmi. Shakthi hates the police force due to a police officer killing his father, who was Sivan's driver, in his childhood. His hatred is such that he hates the khaki colour (which is worn by police in India). Shakthi doesn't let Sivan's watchman wear his Khaki watchman uniform, constantly teases his friend Gopal, who gets selected as a constable, and even loses romantic interest in a woman named Shanthi after he finds out that she is an Inspector.

When Sivan is insulted by Ajay Rathore, a newly appointed police commissioner of Madurai, who wants to wipe the criminal system of Madurai, Sivan forces Shakthi to become an IPS officer to save his crime syndicate and prove the commissioner's words wrong. Reluctantly taking charge as ACP of Madurai City East, Shakthi gives free rein to Sivan and his henchmen, who wreak havoc over Madurai, until one of their activities inadvertently causes a gas leak which destroys a school and some nearby buildings, killing several people, including women and children. The incident, along with the assault of a woman by Sivan's henchmen when she had come to the police station to lodge a complaint against Sivan for killing her husband, shocks Shakthi emotionally and causes him to follow the path of an honest police officer.

Shakti, donning the khaki uniform for the first time, thrashes Sivan's henchmen who assaulted the woman. Sivan does not like Shakthi's new person and, after a heated argument between the two, a cat-and-mouse game begins between Sivan and Shakthi, with Sivan and his henchmen determined to humiliate Shakthi at every opportunity. Shakthi, assisted by Shanthi and Gopal, tries to rid Sivan's influence in Madurai. Shakthi is soon promoted to the rank of DCP for his success in arresting most of Sivan's gang members and beneficiaries within one night. Later, Shakthi finds out that Sivan's other adopted son, minister Aadhi Kesavan, is plotting to kill Sivan in revenge for Sivan killing his police officer father (the same police officer who killed Shakthi's father) in his childhood.

Since Shakthi had inadvertently thwarted his earlier plans to kill Sivan, he also plans to get Sivan to kill Shakthi by killing Sivan's son Vignesh and putting the blame on Shakthi for Vignesh's death. Unfortunately for Aadhi, Sivan learns about his plan and reconciles with Shakti, where they fight Aadhi's henchmen and Aadhi. Shakthi beats up Aadhi and gives him to Sivan to kill. Sivan gives Aadhi a choice to kill himself. Aadhi takes up the choice and slits his throat, thereby killing him. The next day, at Sivan's house, as per Sivan's request, the police came to arrest Sivan. Shakti hesitantly arrests him, and they both walk out of the house in a manner reminiscent of their walking style.

== Cast ==
- Mohanlal as Sivan, a Madurai-based crime boss
- Vijay as ACP Sakthi IPS, Sivan's adopted son and his driver's son, Later DCP
  - Saran Shakthi as young Shakthi
- Kajal Aggarwal as Inspector Shanthi, Shakthi's love interest (Voice dubbed by Deepa Venkat)
- Soori as Constable Gopal, Shakti's childhood friend
- Brahmanandam as Coach Brahma (Telugu dubbed version only; deleted scene in Tamil)
- Sampath Raj as Minister Aadhikesavan, Sivan's another adopted son
  - Sree Raam as young Aadhi
- Pradeep Rawat as Madurai Police Commissioner Ajay Rathore (Voice Dubbed by Thalaivasal Vijay)
- Mahat Raghavendra as Vignesh, Sivan's son
- Nivetha Thomas as Mahalakshmi, Sivan's daughter
- Poornima Bhagyaraj as Parvathi, Sivan's wife
- Thambi Ramaiah as Sivan's aide
- Ravi Mariya as Paandi
- Joe Malloori as Veera Paandi
- Pandi as Murugesan
- R. K as Mahalakshmi's father-in-law
- Jangiri Madhumitha as a police constable
- Vidyullekha Raman as a police constable
- Surekha Vani as a nun
- Imman Annachi as an exam supervisor
- Rajini Nivetha as Shanthi's mother Ranjini
- Vazhakku En Muthuraman as Muthu
- Bava Lakshmanan as Shivan's uncle
- Shammi Thilakan as Aadhi Kesavan's father
- V. I. S. Jayapalan as Periyavar
- Japan Kumar as Gurka
- Charandeep as a corrupt police officer
- Stunt Silva as Royapuram Guna
- Supergood Subramani as a police officer
- Pondy Ravi as a police officer
- Cheran Raj as Aarumugam, Shakthi's father and Sivan's driver.
- Poo Ram as a police officer
- Osthe J. Ram as Sivan's henchman
- Azhagam Perumal as Sundarapandian
- L. B. Sriram as Srinivasan
- Shanmugasundaram as Shanmugham
- Sai Dheena as Dheena
- Singamuthu as Vairamuthu
- Bonda Mani as Mani
- Lollu Sabha Manohar as Manoharan
- Vinodhini Vaidyanathan as Vinodhini (cameo appearance)
- Meenal as the complainant

=== Special appearances ===
- Jiiva in a special appearance in "Paatu Onnu"
- Jithan Ramesh in a Special appearance in "Paatu Onnu"
- R. T. Neason in a special appearance in "Yeppa Mama Treat"
- Sridhar in a special appearance in "Yeppa Mama Treat"
- Scarlett Mellish Wilson in a dance number in "Jingunamani"
- Hazel Crowney in a dance number in "Jingunamani"
- Raveena Daha as a special appearance as a student (Uncredited)

== Production ==
=== Casting ===
Upon the completion of Velayudham (2011), Vijay announced his next project to be with R. T. Neason, who had worked in Velayudham as an assistant to director Jayam Raja. The project however commenced only two years later, after Vijay completed three other films. Neason described Jilla as a "Madurai-based movie" and also revealed that right from 2009, he had this story line about two powerful characters and their emotional interaction, making it his second directorial after Muruga (2007). Vijay who had several collaborations with R. B. Choudary decided to produce the film. Vairamuthu was chosen to pen the lyrics for a song in Jilla, who would be writing a song for Vijay after 12 years. Malayalam Superstar Mohanlal plays the other leading role when he liked the script and accepted the film. Raju Sundaram will be choreographing the dance sequences in the film.

Nisha Agarwal was rumored to be performing in the film, but she denied these rumors on Twitter, stating that she had not been approached for a film role. Kajal Aggarwal and Poornima Bhagyaraj were also slated to perform in the film. Gautam Kurup was signed up as the second antagonist. Niveda Thomas said that she would be playing the daughter of Mohanlal's character and sister of Vijay's character. Due to clash of dates, cinematographer Natty Subramaniam was replaced by R. Ganesh. During a photoshoot with the main cast, Nesan announced that filming would take place in Madurai, Chennai and Andhra Pradesh, while songs would be filmed overseas.

=== Filming ===
The opening ceremony for the film was held on 11 March 2013 at R. B. Choudary's Chennai office. The first schedule of film shooting took off on 13 May in Madurai and Karaikudi with Mohanlal and Poornima Bhagyaraj. Vijay was reported to join by the end of the month, but this didn't materialise. For the next schedule the film crew shifted to a Chennai-based studio where large sets resembling the city of Madurai were built up for the film. In September 2013, it was reported that Vijay and Kajal Aggarwal would be playing police officers in the film.

The fourth schedule of the film was supposed to start on 14 August. However, the shooting got cancelled due to heavy rain. In October it was reported that 80% of the film had been completed with only the song sequences remaining.

== Release ==
Jilla was released on 9 January 2014 in France, Singapore and Canada, and worldwide on 10 January 2014. The satellite rights of the film were purchased by Sun TV for a record price of ₹16 crore (US$1.7 million).

=== Critical reception ===
Jilla received generally positive reviews from critics and audience who praised the cast performances (particularly Mohanlal and Vijay), background score and action sequences, while the length was criticized and consequently trimmed by ten minutes.

Sify stated that the film is a "Mass Masala Entertainer" and wrote, "Jilla is masala entertainment and a full course meal that leaves you with a smile on your face", calling it "a perfect outing with your family this festival season and rated 4/5". The Times of India gave 3.5 stars out of 5 and stated "As far as commercial films are concerned, Jilla is definitely assured filmmaking", while adding, "the main issue with Jilla is that it is overlong. Neason, probably in an effort to make it a wholesome entertainer, keeps packing in scenes oblivious to the running time. Ananda Vikatan rated the film 41 out of 100.

Bangalore Mirror gave 3.5 out of 5 and called it "a perfect festival film that has all the trappings of a blockbuster" Gautaman Bhaskaran of Hindustan Times gave the film 3/5 stars and stated, Mohanlal and "Vijay captivating style and powerful performance makes the movie a solid family entertainer". S Saraswathi of Rediff gave 3.5/5 and wrote, Mohanlal and "Vijay easily keep the audience entertained with their powerful performances, both equally confident and secure in their own ability, undoubtedly making the film a solid commercial entertainer for the masses."

=== Box office ===
Jilla's opening netted around ₹10 million (US$100,000) in Tamil Nadu alone. IB Times stated it opened well in Kerala too. It grossed around ₹25 million (US$260,000) worldwide on its opening day and ₹70 million (US$730,000) worldwide in its extended five-day weekend. In Chennai city alone, the film netted ₹3.24 million (US$34,000)in the first week with an average theater occupancy of 97% and stood first for the weekend. The second week had an occupancy of 85-90% in the city and netted around ₹3.60 million (US$37,000) The film still stood at the number ten position in Chennai by the third week resulting in a total collection of ₹5.98 million (US$62,000). Jilla grossed around ₹5 million (US$52,000) by the fourth week in Kerala. After 8 weeks at the Chennai box office, the film netted around ₹5.8 million (US$60,000).

Jilla released at 44 screens in UK. The film collected ₹1.54 crore (US$160,000) Jilla has grossed £4,815 from five screens in its third weekend at the UK box office. It had a collection of £243,029 (₹2.54 crore (US$260,000)) in 17 days. In Australia. The film has grossed a total of A$43,899 ₹24.06 lakh (US$25,000) in 17 days at the Australian box office. Jilla opened at Number 2 in Malaysian Box Office and was released in 69 screens. Mohanlal's Jilla has made ₹24.06 lakh (US$25,000) from 36 screens in the first weekend.

== Remake plans ==
In a meeting with his fans' association at Srikakulam in January 2014, Chiranjeevi announced that he wants V. V. Vinayak to direct the remake of Jilla (2014) starring himself and his son Ram Charan after the 2014 Indian general elections. It was supposed to be Chiranjeevi's 150th film as an actor. Chiranjeevi opted to choose a script that would reflect the sentiments of Telugu people and walked out from the remake. Charan felt uncomfortable to reprise a role where he has to oppose his father and being dissatisfied with the story, he dropped the remake's proposal.

In late March 2014, R. T. Neason, the director of the original, wanted to direct the Telugu remake bankrolled by Super Good Films. Neason wanted Nandamuri Balakrishna and N. T. Rama Rao Jr. to reprise the roles played by Mohanlal and Vijay in the original respectively. Its possibility was doubtful because of the strained relationship between Balakrishna and Rama Rao Jr. in the past few years. After the release of Gopala Gopala (2015), its co-producer Sharat Marar acquired the remake rights of Jilla and approached Daggubati Venkatesh and Ravi Teja with the proposal of its remake to be directed by Veeru Potla.

In the past, Potla approached both Venkatesh and Ravi Teja with a storyline in July 2014 which upon their consent was developed into a script, which remained in scripting stage according to Ravi Teja as of late September 2014. Kona Venkat was reported to pen the remake's screenplay. Ravi Teja evinced interest to be a part of the remake and the film's production was expected to begin in April 2015. However, there were reports stating that Jilla would be dubbed into Telugu with a duration of 140 minutes including a separate comedy track on Brahmanandam with Vijay. Also, Rama Rao Jr.'s elder brother Nandamuri Kalyan Ram planned to remake Jilla in Telugu with Balakrishna after arranging a special screening for the latter.

The Telugu dubbed version was confirmed in mid April 2015. Tamatam Kumar Reddy and Prasad Sannidhi of Sri Obuleswara Productions acquired the Telugu dubbing rights while R. B. Chowdary was announced to present the film. The deleted track that was shot with Mohanlal, Vijay and Brahmanandam in Tamil was kept in the Telugu version. Shashank Vennelakanti penned the dialogues for the Telugu dubbed version. After considering many other titles, Jilla was retained for the Telugu dubbed version.
