= K. Ravi Shankar =

Indian film director

K. Ravi Shankar is an Indian film director born as Krishnamoorthy Ravi Shankar, best known for his Bollywood films of the late 1980s and early 1990s. He is the son of noted Bollywood producer A. Krishnamoorthy.He has mostly directed films for his home banner Tina Films International. He has worked with many top Bollywood actors when their respective careers were in their infancy such as Govinda in Dariya Dil in 1988 and Shilpa Shetty in Aag in 1994. Shankar has also produced several films including Swarag Se Sunder in 1986 and Gharana in 1989.

== Filmography ==
- Sindoor (1987)
- Dariya Dil (1988)
- Gharana (1989)
- Benaam Badsha (1991)
- Meera Ka Mohan (1992)
- Apradhi (1992)
- Sadhna (1993)
- Meherbaan (1993)
- Aag (1994)
- Mere Do Anmol Ratan (1998)
- Kuch Tum Kaho Kuch Hum Kahein (2002)
- Iqraar by Chance (2006)
