= Prematho Raa =

2001 film by K. R. Udhayashankar

- Directed by: Udayasankar
- Written by: P. Rajendra Kumar (dialogues)
- Screenplay by: Udayasankar
- Story by: Bhupati Raja
- Produced by: T. Trivikrama Rao
- Starring: Venkatesh; Simran
- Cinematography: S. Gopal Reddy
- Edited by: Marthand K. Venkatesh
- Music by: Mani Sharma
- Production company: Vijayalakshmi Art Pictures
- Release date: 9 May 2001
- Running time: 154 minutes
- Country: India
- Language: Telugu

Prematho Raa (transl. Come with love) is a 2001 Indian Telugu-language romantic drama film directed by Udayasankar and produced by T. Trivikrama Rao under Vijayalakshmi Art Pictures. Starring Venkatesh and Simran in the lead roles, the film features music composed by Mani Sharma.

This film marked the second collaboration between Venkatesh, Simran, and Udayasankar, following the success of Kalisundam Raa (2000). However, Prematho Raa failed to replicate the success of their previous venture and was a box office failure. It was later dubbed into Tamil as Kadhal Galatta.

== Plot ==
Chandu and Vijay are brothers. They belong to a wealthy family where the elder brother Vijay is responsible for taking care of the business. The younger one Chandu is a spoilt brat and a womanizer.

Vijay is in love with Sandhya. Chandu happens to visit Ooty and falls for a damsel, Geeta. But Geeta remains aloof. So he plays different tricks to attract her. One fine day he expresses his love to her and duly deflowers her. The next day, he takes the train to Hyderabad without informing Geeta and attends the marriage of his brother Vijay and Sandhya. At the time of marriage, Sandhya enters the scene with Geeta revealing that she is her younger sister and was used by Chandu to satisfy his lust. Sandhya breaks the marriage with Vijay.

Chandu realizes his mistake and repents for the same. He approaches Sandhya and pleads with her. She gives him an opportunity to change. If she realizes that Chandu is a changed man after six months, then she will endorse the marriage of Chandu and Geeta. The rest of the film is all about how effectively Chandu convinces Geeta.

== Cast ==
- Venkatesh as Chandu
- Simran as Geeta
- Suresh as Vijay
- Prema as Sandhya
- Murali Mohan as Chandu's father
- Sujatha as Chandu's grandmother
- Kota Srinivasa Rao as Chandu's grandfather
- Brahmanandam as hotel server
- Ali as Chandu's friend
- AVS as Astrologist
- Asha Saini as Anitha
- Isha Koppikar as Swetha
- Mink Brar as Bharathi
- L. B. Sriram
- Rama Prabha
- Prasad Babu as Officer In-Charge at Airport
- Subbaraya Sarma
- Madhurisen as Geetha's friend
- Kalpana Rai as Seetamma
- Junior Relangi
- Gowtham Raju
- Mithai Chitti
- Gadiraju Subba Rao
- Mukhtar Khan as Jagan
- Naveen
- Sri Harsha
- Radha
- Indu Anand
- Banda Jyothi
- Richa Pallod as Swapna (Special appearance)

== Production ==
The filming began in October 2000 and was held at locations such as Hyderabad, New Zealand, Malaysia, Kuala Lumpur, Rajasthan, Jaisalmer and Jaipur.

== Soundtrack ==
Prematho Raa

Soundtrack album by Mani Sharma
- Released: 2001
- Genre: Soundtrack
- Length: 31:57
- Label: Aditya Music
- Producer: Mani Sharma

Mani Sharma chronology
Kushi (2001)	Prematho Raa (2001)	Bhalevadivi Basu (2001)

Music was composed by Mani Sharma. Auido soundtrack was released on Aditya Music label.

Telugu Tracklist — Prematho Raa
No.	Title	Lyrics	Singer(s)	Length
1.	"Chandamamatho"	Chandrabose	KK	5:05
2.	"Hey Dhaga Dhaga"	Jonnavithhula Ramalingeswara Rao	S. P. Balasubrahmanyam, Swarnalatha	4:57
3.	"Emaindho Emo"	Sirivennela Sitarama Sastry	S. P. Balasubrahmanyam, Harini	5:16
4.	"Punnamila"	Chandrabose	Udit Narayan, Sujatha	4:36
5.	"Babu Bathayi"	Chandrabose	S. P. Balasubrahmanyam, Kavita Subramaniam	5:14
6.	"Gopala"	Veturi	Shankar Mahadevan, Gopika Poornima, Prasanna, Kalpana	4:21
7.	"Preminchadame"	Sirivennela Sitarama Sastry	Srinivas	2:09
Total length:				31:57

Tamil Tracklist (Dubbed)— Kadhal Galatta
No.	Title	Lyrics	Singer(s)	Length
1.	"Yei Thoda Thoda"	Pa. Vijay	Tippu, Malgudi Subha	4:57
2.	"Yetho Yetho Ennil"	Pa. Vijay	Srinivas, Gopika Poornima	5:16
3.	"Mella Mella Vandhachu"	Pa. Vijay	Krishnaraj, Amrutha	4:36
4.	"Kadhal Kacheri Adhu Neethan"	Viveka	Krishnaraj, Gopika Poornima	5:14
5.	"Gopala Vada"	Kalaikumar	Tippu, Malgudi Subha	4:21

== Reception ==
Idlebrain wrote, "The touch of Uday Shankar, who has given a memorable film like 'Kalisundam Raa, is not there in this film. This entire film, including songs and comedy, lacks continuity. Screenplay and direction of this film is not up to Venky standards". Full Hyderabad wrote, "When a movie starts 10 minutes early on the second day of its showing, you begin to wonder if there isn't something amiss. And your fears would be validated in the first half an hour of 'Prematho Raa' itself - the initial part of the movie is the very definition of predictability". Andhra Today wrote, "Unlike Venkatesh's movies which have been known for their variety stories, and for drawing big crowds, this movie has a very ordinary story which will disappoint the audience. A weak story combined with a screen-play of similar quality will not impress the movie-goers".
