= Velayudham =

2011 film by M. Raja

- Theatrical release poster
- Directed by: M. Raja
- Screenplay by: M. Raja; R. T. Neason
- Dialogues by: Subha
- Story by: Mohan Raja
- Produced by: V. Ravichandran
- Starring: Vijay; Genelia D'Souza; Hansika Motwani
- Cinematography: Priyan
- Edited by: B. Lenin; V. T. Vijayan
- Music by: Vijay Antony
- Production company: Aascar Film Pvt. Ltd
- Release date: 26 October 2011
- Running time: 167 minutes
- Country: India
- Language: Tamil
- Budget: est. ₹45 crore
- Box office: est. ₹60 crore

Velayudham (/veɪlɑːjʊðəm/) is a 2011 Indian Tamil-language superhero film directed by M. Raja, who co-wrote the screenplay with R. T. Neason, while the dialogues were written by the duo Subha. Produced by V. Ravichandran, it stars Vijay in the title role with Genelia D'Souza and Hansika Motwani, while Santhanam, Saranya Mohan, Soori, Abhimanyu Singh, and Vineet Kumar play prominent roles. In the film, a journalist tracks down a villager who had unknowingly foiled a terrorist plot and persuades him to embrace his heroism as a symbol of hope for the people.

Velayudham was inspired by the 2000 Telugu film Azad; Raja obtained permission to remake the film but eventually retained only the premise. Filming began in July 2010 and continued till September 2011, lasting 150 working days; filming primarily took place in Pollachi and Udumalaipettai for the village portions, while rest of the action and song sequences were filmed in Chennai, Hyderabad, Odisha, Kochi and Kashmir. The music was composed by Vijay Antony with cinematography by Priyan and editing by B. Lenin and V. T. Vijayan.

Velayudham was released on 26 October 2011 coinciding with Diwali and became a commercial success. Amongst its accolades, the film won two Edison Awards and an Ananda Vikatan Cinema Award, while being nominated for a South Indian International Movie Award and two Vijay Awards.

== Plot ==
Bharathi, a young journalist, and her two friends investigate a series of terrorist attacks which have taken place in Chennai and also other illegal activities like human trafficking. One night, Bharathi and her friends are caught video-recording illicit activities happening in a secluded house by a group of thugs, where they attempt to flee from them. While Bharathi's friends are murdered, Bharathi manages to escape despite being stabbed by one of the thugs. After the attack on Bharathi and her friends, the thugs' vehicle explodes due to a small mishap when a cigarette falls over petrol packets stored in the vehicle, killing the thugs.

Bharathi comes up with a new idea to eradicate society's evils by creating and propagating a fictitious character called "Velayudham" (after seeing a Murugan temple nearby) who wants to clean up the city of terrorism and other illegal activities. Meanwhile, in a village named Pavunoor. Velayudham "Velu" is a milk vendor who lives with his younger sister Kaveri and niece Vaidehi, unaware that she likes him as a future husband. One day, Velu, Kaveri, and Vaidehi leave for Chennai to collect money from a chit fund for Kaveri's marriage. At the Chennai Egmore railway station, Velu's handbag is stolen by Speedu, a petty thief. Velu pursues Speedu on a motorbike parked at the station and manages to get back his money. Moments after alighting from the bike, the bike explodes.

The parked bike had a bomb which was meant to ensure a terrorist attack at the railway station, which Velu inadvertently thwarted. Velu unknowingly prevents more terrorist attacks and comes to Bharathi's attention. At first, Bharathi hates him due to various incidents, but when she sees him unknowingly handing over the terrorists to the police, she falls in love with him without knowing that Vaidehi also loves him. When Bharathi learns that Velu unknowingly prevented the attacks, she convinces him to take up the role of Velayudham and provide hope for the people, but Velu refuses and tells her to finish the avatar of Velayudham.

Later, Velu learns that his money is stolen and the company where he insured the money was a corrupt company. The people get enraged when they learn that their money was stolen. One of them commits suicide by burning himself alive. When the villagers tells that Velayudham will come and help them, Velu plans to take the role of Velayudham and kills the person who stole the people's money and returns the money to the people. In the avatar of Velayudham, Velu starts to eradicate society's evils among others, where he soon gains wide support and acceptance among the public and police.

A few months later, Velu returns to Pavunoor with Bharathi for Kaveri's marriage. Unknown to Velu, Musafir Ibrahim, the leader of a terrorist group followed him to his village. Ibrahim wants to kill Velu since he thwarted every terrorist attack that he had planned in Chennai. On the day of Kaveri's marriage, a bomb planted by Ibrahim at Velu's house explodes, killing Kaveri. Velu later learns from Bharathi that the corrupt Home Minister Ulaganathan is indirectly responsible for the terrorist attacks and Kaveri's death.

Ulaganathan allowed Ibrahim to carry out terrorist attacks in exchange for profits and also even tries to gain popularity by claiming Velayudham as his idea. Ulagananthan plans to reveal Ibrahim as Velayudham's real identity in a function at the Nehru Stadium, Chennai. Velu and Bharathi arrives at the stadium, where Velu kills Ibrahim and his henchmen. Velu asks the people not to celebrate him as a superhero any more, but asks them to express their anger on their own without fear. Velu also exposes Ulaganathan's misdeeds with Bharathi's help, and Ulaganathan gets killed in a stampede.

== Cast ==
- Vijay as Velayudham alias "Velu"
- Genelia D'Souza as Bharathi
- Hansika Motwani as Vaidhehi
- Santhanam as Kundusaamy alias Speedu
- Saranya Mohan as Kaveri, Velu's sister
- Pandiarajan as Head Constable Honest Raj
- M. S. Bhaskar as Vaidehi's father
- Sayaji Shinde as ACP Mohammed Feroz Khan IPS
- Ilavarasu as a poor man
- Soori as Abdullah
- T. P. Gajendran as a travelling ticket examiner
- Kadhal Dhandapani as Nattamai
- Vincent Asokan as Ulaganathan's brother
- Pandi as Pandi
- Ajay as Ulaganathan's partner
- Vineet Kumar as Ulaganathan, Home Minister of Tamil Nadu
- Abhimanyu Singh as Musafir Ibrahim
- Junaid Sheikh as Abu Salim
- O. A. K. Sundar as Inspector Kaalidaas
- Veerasamar as Hari
- Krishnamoorthy as a villager
- Crane Manohar as a theatre operator
- Swaminathan as Maama
- George Maryan as a villager
- Balaji. K. Mohan as Bharathi's friend
- Rajendran as a local goon
- Sampath Ram as a local goon
- Munnar Ramesh as a local goon
- Baiju Ezhupunna as a briefcase bomber
- Boys Rajan
- Raaghav as Jai
- Singamuthu as Speedu's father
- Vaiyapuri as Speedu's brother
- Bonda Mani as a beggar
- Lollu Sabha Seshu as Speedu's brother
- Lollu Sabha Manohar as Bhajan Lal Settu
- Siva Narayana Murthy
- Yogi Babu as a villager
- Anjali Devi as Vaidehi's mother
- Meenal

== Production ==
=== Development ===
Velayudham was M. Raja's first directorial in Tamil for another actor, and without the involvement of his father Editor Mohan and brother Ravi Mohan. After the release of Santosh Subramaniam (2008), Vijay who had congratulated Raja for the film's success had teased him in a friendly banter saying whether he would often give successful ventures for his brother Ravi and not for him. Raja was impressed on the actor's offer to work with Vijay and had thought of a possible script for the actor. Raja had analysed Vijay's popularity even before working on the script, as he accompanied a large fanbase ranging from youngsters, families, women and children, owing to him acting in a variety of genres that had its target audience. He also admitted his previous ventures with Ravi were also catered to the family audience. So he admitted not having to change his style to suit him, but instead adding a mass touch to his style.

Like Raja's previous Tamil films which were remakes of Telugu films, it was speculated that Velayudham would also be a remake of Azad (2000). However, Raja denied the same even though he had bought the rights of that film. Raja stated that the original film's director, Thirupathisamy, had told about the story to him before he narrated to Nagarjuna. Since then, Raja had this idea in mind and had developed into a complete script that was fresh and different from the original film. Since Vijay had garnered a huge fan following with a larger-than-life personality, Raja felt the story had suited his image. It took him 10 months to write the script, which he co-wrote with R. T. Neason, the latter of whom would direct Vijay in Jilla (2014). When he narrated the story to Vijay, the latter was "really excited" about the part agreeing to do the film. The film was produced by V. Ravichandran of Aascar Films which had previously distributed Vijay's Kadhalukku Mariyadhai (1997) and featured musician Vijay Antony, cinematographer Priyan, editor duo B. Lenin and V. T. Vijayan and art director Milan as part of the technical crew.

=== Casting ===
Raja admitted that he had given his own style of characterization for Vijay, like his previous films while also adding an image that appealed to the masses. He described the character as a normal man "who does super things for society and people" and not a "super hero with supernatural powers". Vijay also admitted the same regarding his character. Genelia D'Souza who worked with Raja in Santosh Subramaniam was chosen to play the role of a journalist and Hansika Motwani was cast as the village girl, which Raja noted "should remind viewers of Khushboo in her heyday". Both the lead actresses were given ample importance to the storyline. Their voices were dubbed by Savitha Radhakrishnan, who had often provided voice-overs for both actresses in their individual films. Saranya Mohan was cast as Vijay's sister. Around 30 comedy actors were cast in the film which includes Soori, Santhanam and M. S. Bhaskar, and 15 antagonists with Abhimanyu Singh as the main one.

=== Filming ===
The film was launched on 15 July 2010 at the Annamalai University in Chidambaram in the presence of thousands of fans. Raja initially planned to shoot 60 percent of the film in villages and remaining portions should be shot in Chennai and Hyderabad. The village portions of the film were shot in Vallakundapuram near Pollachi, and in Udumalaipettai. Around 50 actors and 200 junior artists were present throughout the shooting schedule ensuring the scale of the film. During the shooting in Uduamalaipettai, Vijay gifted around 108 milch cows to the poor families. The song "Sonna Puriyadhu" was filmed with hundreds of local folk dancers along with artists from Mumbai and Russia. The song almost cost around ₹2 crore (equivalent to ₹4.5 crore or US$480,000 in 2026). By April, 80 percent of the film's shooting was completed.

The film featured six action sequences, under the supervision of Anal Arasu. Two action sequences were mainly filmed in the Chennai Port and at the Golconda fort in Hyderabad. Hollywood stunt co-ordinator Tom Delmar had worked on a risky stunt sequence on a moving train with Vijay and other antagonists, which was shot in Rayagada, Odisha. The climax portions for the film began during May 2011. The sequence which takes place in a cricket stadium in Kochi was completed by July 2011. The song "Molachu Moonu" was filmed in Kashmir with Vijay, Motwani and D'Souza. Filming was completed by September 2011, after the song was shot. The entire film was completed within 150 working days.

== Themes and influences ==
The film's superhero costume worn by Vijay's character was reported to have been borrowed from the Assassin's Creed video game series, bearing resemblance to the costumes of the characters Altaïr Ibn-La'Ahad and Ezio Auditore da Firenze, leading to criticism of the film being "copied" from Assassin's Creed. 7 Aum Arivu, which had released alongside Velayudham, was also compared with the game series though for different reasons. Sudhish Kamath compared Velayudham to the Pink Panther films for featuring a series of "unintentional world-saving incidents", while The New Indian Express noted its thematic similarities to Main Azaad Hoon (1989) and Meet John Doe (1941).

== Music ==
The soundtrack and background score are composed by Vijay Antony with lyrics written by Annamalai, Priyan, Viveka and Siva Shanmugam. The album consisted of six tracks and was released by Sony Music India on 28 August 2011. More than one lakh audio CDs were sold on the first day of its release.

== Release ==
Velayudham was initially scheduled to be released during the summer (April–June) of 2011, but filming was not completed by then. The film was later scheduled for an August 2011 release, clashing with Mankatha. But at the film's audio launch held during that time, Vijay announced that the film would be released on 26 October 2011 during Diwali. The same was confirmed the following month, thereby clashing with Ra.One and 7 Aum Arivu. The film was cleared for release by the Central Board of Film Certification in mid-October.

Velayudham opened in 800 screens worldwide with around 350–400 screens in Tamil Nadu. In Chennai, the film opened in 40 screens despite competition from 7 Aum Arivu. The overseas distribution rights were acquired by Ayngaran International while the Karnataka theatrical rights were acquired by K. Manju. The Kerala rights were acquired by Shibu Thameens and was released in over 80 screens across the state. A week after the film's release, the film was premiered in an additional 100 screens worldwide owing to the positive response.

On 1 November 2011, coinciding with the occasion of Karnataka Rajyotsava, Karnataka Rakshana Vedike (KRV), a pro-Kannada outfit in Karnataka, requested all the theatres in the state not to screen any non-Kannada film on that occasion, but some of the exhibitors were reluctant to adhere to their pleas, which resulted in the activists protesting against Velayudham. However, the theatre authorities realised that the situation might reach out of control and agreed to cancel all the shows of Velayudham screening on that particular day.

== Reception ==
=== Critical response ===
A critic from Sify gave Velayudham 4/5 stars and called it a good value for the money ("paisa vassol"), stating that the film was a "perfect outing with family, but [is] far too long." Venkateswaran Narayanan of The Times of India gave 3.5 out of 5 stars and concluded that Velayudham is sure to add to his box-office muscle. Malathi Rangarajan of The Hindu stated that the film "simply enters and entertains" and that Raja had "churned out reasonably engaging fare", adding that it had a "strong story, a neat screenplay arresting action, admirable dance movements, one or two hum-worthy numbers and the ever-helpful sister sentiment." The New Indian Express wrote, "Some crisp editing here would have helped. Unpretentious and engaging for the most part, Velayudham should be a treat for Vijay fans".

Pavithra Srinivasan of Rediff.com gave 2.5 out of 5 stars saying, "Raja has set out to provide a masala entertainer that doesn't require you to tax your brain cells. Velayudham doesn't take itself seriously and doesn't expect you to either." Indo-Asian News Service rated the film 2.5 out of 5 stars, criticising Antony's music and saying the songs were impeding the narrative, adding that the film "defies all logic. But it has the magic of the star called Vijay and the magic works well with the audiences". Deccan Herald wrote: "[Lengthy], lethargic and [lackadaisical] Velayudham is best left to Vijay's brigade." Ananda Vikatan rated the film 42 out of 100.

=== Box office ===
Velayudham earned ₹40 crore (equivalent to ₹90 crore or US$9.6 million in 2026) worldwide, during the first weekend, with ₹19.5 crore (equivalent to ₹44 crore or US$4.7 million in 2026) coming from Tamil Nadu. In Chennai, the film earned around ₹2.10 crore (equivalent to ₹4.7 crore or US$500,000 in 2026) during the first five days. The film also opened well in overseas territories, such as the United Kingdom and United States, though the performance in United Kingdom gradually improved. It secured a lifetime of $107,843 in overseas territories.

Sharanya CR in her column for Daily News and Analysis felt Velayudham being successful over the highly anticipated 7 Aum Arivu, was considered a surprise for trade analysts and she noted the low-profile promotions and the makers' assurance on the film being a commercial entertainer had benefited. In Kerala, the film was considered a success earning around ₹7.6 crore (equivalent to ₹17 crore or US$1.8 million in 2026) in its lifetime. The film earned around ₹60 crore (equivalent to ₹135 crore or US$14 million in 2026) during its overall theatrical run and was considered a success by trade analysts.

=== Accolades ===
Award (Note: Awards, festivals and organisations are in alphabetical order.)	Date of ceremony (Note: Date is linked to the article about the awards held that year, wherever possible.)	Category	Recipient(s)	Result	Ref.
Ananda Vikatan Cinema Awards	5 January 2012	Best Comedian	Santhanam (Note: also for Deiva Thirumagal)	Won	
Edison Awards	14 February 2012	Best Actor	Vijay	Won	
Edison Awards	14 February 2012	Superstar Rajini Award	Vijay	Won	
South Indian International Movie Awards	21–22 June 2012	Best Male Playback Singer – Tamil	V. V. Prasanna – ("Molachu Moonu")	Nominated	
V4 Entertainment Awards	4 January 2012	Best Film	Velayudham	Won	
Vijay Awards	16 June 2012	Best Actor	Vijay	Nominated	
Vijay Awards	16 June 2012	Favourite Film	Velayudham – Aascar Films	Nominated	

== See also ==
- List of Indian superhero films
