= Runway (2009 film) =

- Directed by: Sunil Tiwari and Praful Tiwari
- Written by: Praful Tiwari
- Produced by: Reeta J Shukla
- Starring: Amarjeet Shukla; Tulip Joshi; Lucky Ali; Deepal Shaw; Shawar Ali; Sharat Saxena; Rauf Lala
- Cinematography: Pathan Parvez Khan
- Music by: Shamir Tandon
- Release date: 26 June 2009
- Country: India
- Language: Hindi

Runway is a 2009 action thriller directed by Suneil and Praful Tiwari.

== Plot ==
With a hand on the trigger and an eye on the casino owner Victor, Allan goes to Mauritius. Back home in Daman is the reason he has turned into a contract killer, Melvyna Bajaj, a victim of drug abuse.

Mauritius is full of colourful characters like Shaina, a dancer in the casino; Khalid, an assassin on Interpol's wanted list and David, a casino owner.

As the story unfolds we find out if Allan saves Melvyna, outsmarts the smartest crooks around and hits his target.

== Cast ==
- Amarjeet Shukla as Allan
- Tulip Joshi as Shaina
- Lucky Ali as Khalid Azmi
- Deepal Shaw as Melvyna Bajaj
- Shawar Ali as David
- Sharat Saxena as Anthony
- Rauf Lala as Rauf
- Ishrat Ali
- Vida Samadzai
- Dayanand Shetty
- Nagesh Bhonsle

== Music ==
=== Tracks ===
- Khuda Ke Liye - Mustafa Zahid
- Khuda Ke Liye (Remix) - Mustafa Zahid
- Pyaasi Machuriya - Sunidhi Chauhan
- Roshan Dil Ka Jahan - Shaan, Sunidhi Chauhan
- Roshan Dil Ka Jahan (Dance Mix) - Sunidhi Chauhan
- Teri Yaadein - KK
- Teri Yaadein (Remix) - KK

== Reception ==
Taran Adarsh of Bollywood Hungama gave the film 1.5 out of 5, writing, "On the whole, RUNWAY is saddled with a weak script and therefore, has limited chances." Minty Tejpal of Pune Mirror wrote, "The cinematography is below average, with no composition or framing, and seems to have been shot on Super 16. Worse, the film is edited in a very jerky manner. To make up for the poor scripting and cinematography, the background score seems to be scored on acid, having a life of its own." Shubhra Gupta of The Indian Express gave a negative review, calling the film "a puzzle from the first to last."
