= Kuruthi Kalam =

2021 Indian web series by Rajapandi

- Release poster
- Genre: Crime
- Written by: Danush; K. Mohan; Vignesh Karthick; Kishore Sankar; Kaviraj
- Directed by: P. Rajapandi; Danush
- Starring: Santhosh Prathap; Sanam Shetty
- Country of origin: India
- Original language: Tamil
- No. of seasons: 1

Production
- Producers: Sameer Nair; Deepak Segal
- Production companies: Applause Entertainment; Arpad Cine Factory

Original release
- Release: 22 January 2021

Kuruthi Kalam (transl. Bloody field) is a 2021 Indian Tamil-language crime series produced for MX Player, written and directed by Rajapandi and Danush. Produced by Applause Entertainment and Arpad Cine Factory, it stars Santhosh Prathap, Sanam Shetty and Ashok Kumar Balakrishnan in the lead roles. The show is set against the fictional backdrop of brutal gang wars in Chennai, and was released on 22 January 2021.

== Cast ==
- Santhosh Prathap as Vijay
- Sanam Shetty as Maheshwari
- Ashok Kumar Balakrishnan as item Kumar
- Vincent Asokan as Venkatesh
- Eden Kuriakose as Subbulakshmi
- Santhana Bharathi as Paneerselvam
- Soundararaja as Arun
- G. Marimuthu as Periasamy
- Srikanth as Moorthy

== Production ==
The series was shot in mid-2019 and was initially produced by Kutty Padmini and later by Applause Entertainment and Arpad Cine Factory.

== Release ==
The web series was released on 22 January 2021 on MX Player. A critic from Binged.com noted "in terms of filmmaking aesthetics and treatment, Kuruthi may be no Mirzapur, but it is a good time-pass if one were to ignore the crassness." The reviewer added "the non-linear screenplay always has a surprise in store which more than makes up for the absence of finesse in the execution". A review from entertainment portal LetsOTT noted it was a "time-worn gangster tale that does not surprise you anywhere".
