= Donga (film) =

1985 film by A. Kodandarami Reddy

- Theatrical release poster
- Directed by: A. Kodandarami Reddy
- Written by: Paruchuri Brothers (dialogues)
- Screenplay by: A. Kodandarami Reddy
- Story by: Vietnam Veedu Sundaram
- Produced by: T. Trivikram Rao
- Starring: Chiranjeevi; Radha
- Cinematography: V. S. R. Swamy
- Edited by: Kotagiri Venkateswara Rao
- Music by: Chakravarthy
- Production company: Vijayalakshmi Art Pictures
- Release date: 14 March 1985
- Running time: 145 minutes
- Country: India
- Language: Telugu

Donga (transl. Burglar) is a 1985 Indian Telugu-language action film directed by A. Kodandarami Reddy and produced by T. Trivikrama Rao under his banner Vijayalakshmi Art Pictures. The film stars Chiranjeevi and Radha while Rao Gopal Rao, Allu Ramalingaiah and Gollapudi Maruti Rao play the supporting roles with music composed by Chakravarthy. Released on 14 March 1985, the film was a commercial success. The Tamil dub is titled Kolai Karan.

== Plot ==
Phani (Chiranjeevi) commits thefts just to help the poor. He loves Kodandaramayya's daughter Manju Latha (Radha), but he seeks revenge against Kodandaramayya (Rao Gopala Rao) for killing his father. He also wants his sister Malathi (Rajyalakshmi) to marry Rajesh (Raja), son of Anjaneyulu, but he needs ₹50,000 for her dowry. At the same time, Viswanatham (Sridhar), an income tax officer, wants his sister Rekha to marry Rajesh. With the help of the police, Phani succeeds in liquidating Kodandaramayya's gang and has his revenge. He also acquires enough money to arrange his sister's marriage with Rajesh.

== Cast ==
- Chiranjeevi as Phani
- Radha as Manjulatha
- Rao Gopal Rao as Kodandaramayya
- Allu Ramalingaiah as Rama Subbaiah
- Gollapudi Maruthi Rao as Anjaneyulu
- Sridhar as Viswanath
- Rajendra Prasad as Inspector Ravi
- Nutan Prasad as Ranga
- Raja as Rajesh
- P. L. Narayana as Chandra Shekar Rao
- Chalapathi Rao
- Bheemiswara Rao
- Chitti Babu
- Silk Smitha
- Rajyalakshmi as Malathi
- Poornima
- Shubha
- Harish as young Phani
- Mamatha
- Athili Lakshmi

== Soundtrack ==
Music was composed by Chakravarthy. Lyrics were written by Veturi. The music was released on AVM Audio Company.

| | Song title | Singers | length |
|---|---|---|---|
| 1 | "Golimaar" | S. P. Balasubrahmanyam | 4:23 |
| 2 | "Sari Sari" | S. P. Balasubrahmanyam, P. Susheela | 4:53 |
| 3 | "Donga Donga" | S. P. Balasubrahmanyam, P. Susheela | 5:11 |
| 4 | "Andhama Ala" | S. P. Balasubrahmanyam, S. Janaki | 4:42 |
| 5 | "Thappanaka" | S. P. Balasubrahmanyam, P. Susheela | 4:54 |
| 6 | "Idhi Pandhem" | S. P. Balasubrahmanyam, S. Janaki | 4:11 |

== Reception ==
C. S. V of Andhra Patrika writing his review on 29 March 1985, appreciated the performances of the lead cast and Chakravathy's music.

== Legacy ==
The film's musical number "Golimar" (transl. Shoot the bullet) has choreography from and elements heavily inspired by the music video for Michael Jackson's song "Thriller". The sequence, which is often referred to as "Indian Thriller", became a viral video; a further parody of the scene by Mike Sutton (Buffalax) titled "Indian Thriller with English lyrics" added subtitles to the video phonetically approximating the original lyrics as English sentences. American dubstep producer Skrillex sampled "Golimar" in a mashup with his song "Scary Monsters and Nice Sprites" entitled "Scary Bolly Dub"—which includes clips of the scene as visuals during live performances.

The film's title has been adapted as that of the Telugu dub version of the Tamil film Thambi (2019) starring Karthi.

The film Go Goa Gone shows footage of the song in a scene.

== See also ==
- Kasam Paida Karne Wale Ki is a 1984 Bollywood film which also parodies Michael Jackson's "Thriller" music video with music from "Billie Jean" in song "Jeena to kya hai Jeena".
