= Amarjeet Shukla =

Indian actor (born 1962)

- Born: Amarjeet Shukla; 12 September 1982 (age 43); India
- Occupation: Actor

Amarjeet Shukla is an Indian actor. He made his debut in Bollywood in a lead role in K.Ravi Shankar's Iqraar By Chance (2006). It was a romantic comedy. His next film Runway was released in 2009. The film also stars Tulip Joshi and Lucky Ali.

== Filmography ==
- Runway (2009) ... Allan
- Iqraar by Chance ...Raj
