= Apradhi (1992 film) =

- Directed by: K. Ravi Shankar
- Written by: Karan Razdan
- Produced by: N.R. Pachisia
- Starring: Anil Kapoor; Vijayashanti
- Cinematography: Manmohan Singh
- Edited by: Waman B. Bhosle
- Music by: Laxmikant–Pyarelal
- Production company: Ratan International
- Release date: 28 October 1992
- Running time: 163 min.
- Country: India
- Language: Hindi

Apradhi is a 1992 Indian Hindi-language drama film directed by K. Ravi Shankar and produced by N.R. Pachisia. It stars Anil Kapoor, Shilpa Shirodkar, Anupam Kher and Vijayashanti in pivotal roles.

== Plot ==
Satyaprakash, an honest security personnel, is suddenly killed. One unknown young man, Shiva, comes to save the family of Satyaprakash.

== Cast ==
- Anil Kapoor as Shiva
- Vijayashanti as Paro
- Chunky Pandey as Salim / Ravi
- Aasif Sheikh as Chander
- Shilpa Shirodkar as Kamini
- Anupam Kher as Heera
- Raza Murad as Balwant
- Suresh Oberoi as Satyaprakash
- Arun Bakshi as Police Inspector
- A. K. Hangal as Bishambharnath
- Urmila Bhatt as Mrs. Bishambharnath
- Subbiraj as Dhanraj
- Aparajita as Parvati
- Jack Gaud as Shakura
- Goga Kapoor as Damodar
- Pradeep Rawat as Teju
- Dan Dhanoa as Badshah
- Krishan Dhawan as Badshah's Friend
- Yunus Parvez as Banwari
- Vijayendra Ghatge in Special Appearance

== Soundtrack ==
#	Title	Singer(s)
1	"Aage Aage Tu Tere"	Alka Yagnik
2	"Dard-e-Dil Jeene Ka"	Mohammad Aziz; Alka Yagnik
3	"Apne Kiye Pe Aaj"	Mohammad Aziz
4	"Yeh Pyar Bada Bedardi Hai"	Vinod Rathod; Alka Yagnik
5	"Jaldi Se Kanyadaan Kardo"	Udit Narayan

Music was composed by Laxmikant–Pyarelal and lyrics were written by Anand Bakshi.
