= Poochudava =

- Title card
- Directed by: Udayasankar
- Written by: Udayasankar
- Dialogues by: udayasankar
- Produced by: K. Jayaraman
- Starring: Abbas; Simran
- Edited by: B. Lenin; V. T. Vijayan
- Music by: Sirpi
- Release date: 12 December 1997
- Country: India
- Language: Tamil

Poochudava is a 1997 Indian Tamil-language romance film directed by Udayasankar and produced by K. Jayaraman. The film stars Abbas and Simran in the lead roles. Manivannan, Nagesh, Kalpana, Jai Ganesh, Chinni Jayanth, PC Ramakrishnan and Kavitha play supporting roles. It was released on 12 December 1997. The film was dubbed in Telugu as Pelli Kala Vacchhesinde Bala.

== Plot ==
Abbas portrays the character of a rebellious college student named Kannan in the movie, while Simran takes on the role of his love interest, Nandhini. The first part of the film revolves around the playful conflicts between Abbas and Simran, while the second half focuses on their collaboration to confront opposition from her parents.

== Cast ==
- Abbas as Kannan
- Simran as Nandhini
- P. C. Ramakrishna as Nandhini's father
- Kalpana as Arul
- Kavitha
- Manivannan
- Nagesh
- Chinni Jayanth
- Jai Ganesh
- Junior Balaiah
- Madhan Bob
- Halwa Vasu
- Vaiyapuri
- AR Murugadoss

== Production ==
The film went through development hell and took a long time to complete. The original producers, MG Pictures, later transferred it to Jayalakshmi Movie Makers owing to financial problems. It was the first film to cast Abbas and Simran together, though VIP (1997), launched much later with both of them, was released earlier. Abbas and Simran simultaneously also worked on another Telugu project titled Priya O Priya during the making of Poochudava.

== Soundtrack ==
The soundtrack was composed by Sirpy.

Song	Singers	Lyrics
"Computer Graphic"	Mano	Palani Bharathi
"Kaadhal Kaadhal Kaadhal"	S. P. Balasubrahmanyam, K. S. Chithra	Palani Bharathi
"Nee Illai"	Hariharan	Palani Bharathi
"Sillu Sillu"	Krishna Chander, Febi Mani, Mano, K. S. Chithra	Palani Bharathi
"Vaaliba Vayasukku"	Hariharan	Palani Bharathi

== Reception ==
Regarding the Telugu dubbed version, a critic from Andhra Today wrote, "With hardly any novelty in the story, it is an out and out director's movie, wherein he has used all his talents to earn the aplomb of the audience".
