= Iqraar by Chance =

- Movie Poster
- Directed by: K. Ravi Shankar
- Written by: Rajeev Agarwal
- Produced by: Reeta J. Shukla
- Starring: Shilpa Anand; Amarjeet Shukla; Rahul Dev; Arbaaz Khan
- Cinematography: Neelabh Kaul
- Edited by: Sanjay Verma
- Music by: Sandesh Shandilya
- Release date: 6 October 2006
- Running time: 129 minutes
- Country: India
- Language: Hindi

Iqraar By Chance is a 2006 Bollywood film directed by K. Ravi Shankar, starring Shilpa Anand and Amarjeet Shukla.

== Plot ==
Born to East Indian parents, Rashmi Mehra lives a wealthy and carefree life in England and often overspends money, leading her dad to question her closely. On one such occasion, she manages to convince him that she can earn as much as £5000 in one month. He accepts her challenge and she sets out to find work.

She soon finds out that it is not easy to get any job, especially without using her dad's name or having any job skills. She does manage to convince the owner of "Suno" FM radio to let her con a young man into falling in love with her, while she ditches him on a reality show.

The young man Rashmi has in mind is Raj, who also uses the alias of CBI Officer R. B. Mathur, who has come from India to nab a gang of drug dealers. She will soon find out that Raj, too, has an agenda in falling for her, as he wants to convince his to-be father-in-law, Talwar, that he is married and Rashmi is his fresh-from-India bride. Things get complicated when the underworld gets word of the original R.B. Mathur and kidnaps Rashmi, mistaken as his bride.

== Cast ==
- Shilpa Anand as Rashmi Mehra
- Amarjeet Shukla as Raj
- Arbaaz Khan as CBI Officer R.B. Mathur
- Rachana Maurya as Dancer in song "Sari Sari Raat Jagawe" ( special appearance )
- Rahul Dev as Sikka
- Narendra Bedi as Constable Dildaar Singh
- Kurush Deboo as Detective D'costa
- Aslam Khan Sanju as Aslam Ahmed Khan
- Manoj Pahwa as Talwar, club owner
- Upasna Singh as Kalawati "Kal" Talwar
- Tiku Talsania as Radio Channel Owner
- Richa Varma as Sonia
- Deepa Bakshi as Tina Talwar

== Music ==
1. Doston – Kunal Ganjawala, Vijay Prakash
2. Ek Baari Aja – Shreya Ghoshal, Udit Narayan
3. Ghoonghat Na Khol – Sonu Kakkar, Shabaab Sabri
4. Iqraar By Chance – Sonu Nigam, Sunidhi Chauhan
5. Saari Saari Raat Jagave – Sunidhi Chauhan, Vijay Prakash
6. Saari Saari Raat Jagave (Remix) – Sunidhi Chauhan, Vijay Prakash
7. Teri In Aadaon Ne - Shreya Ghoshal, Vijay Prakash

== Release ==
The Film was released on 6 October 2006. DVD was released by Eros Entertainment on 27 March 2007.
