= Maya Puthagam =

Indian fantasy thriller film

- Theatrical release poster
- Directed by: Rama Jayaprakash
- Written by: Rama Jayaprakash
- Produced by: B Vinod Jain
- Starring: Ashok Kumar Balakrishnan; Abarnathi; Srikanth
- Cinematography: Arumugam
- Edited by: Priyan
- Music by: Ravi Vijayanand
- Production company: Jaguar Studios
- Release date: 19 July 2024
- Country: India
- Language: Tamil

Maya Puthagam (transl. Magic book) is a 2024 Indian Tamil-language fantasy thriller film directed by Rama Jayaprakash. The film stars Ashok Kumar and Abarnathi along with Srikanth, Aadukalam Naren, Madhankumar Dhakshinamoorthy and K S G Venkatesh supporting roles.

Synopsis: film starts with a group of goons trying to take away the diamond stone that is over the mayaputhagam, suddenly a huge snake enters and all the goons die as they get burnt. Now guru who is a struggling director comes to Naren who advised him of the abandoned palace and gives him some companions and tells heroine will join them later. While at the abandoned palace strange experience all faces, by the time pass heroine also joins with makeup man . Guru gradually finds he gets extra ability to dance very well and also gets protected by some superpower and identifies the snake that is following him and protecting him. Guru outbursts one day asking why the snake protecting him, to this the snake now shown as panchamidevi tells flashback as she is daughter of queen and happens to handle a diamond stone that others get burnt if tries to handle the diamond so panchamidevi idetifies she is daughter of nagas. Now panchamidevi has extreme ability and starts defeating other kings, she sets free the prisoners. One of the prisoner was Srikanth who later loves each other. One day enemy king while talking stabs panchamidevi to death and they conquer the kingdom and kills many people. Now a weeping panchamidevi tells she idetifies Srikanth in guru so trying to protect guru. Later dasarath who is enemy to guru comes to kill guru but panchamidevi kills him and suddenly gets her body shape like a queen back and she tells guru she is leaving the diamond stone for them and she about to ascend but guru takes the stone and stops her ascending and panchamidevi sees Srikanth in guru and film ends both of them as Srikanth as guru and panchamidevi in her queen shape unite and go together.

== Cast ==
- Ashok Kumar Balakrishnan as Guru
- Abarnathi as Panchamadevi
- Srikanth as Yoga Narasimha
- Aadukalam Naren as Rangaraja Yaadhavrayar
- Pawan
- Madhankumar Dhakshinamoorthy
- K S G Venkatesh
- Ilavarasu as Sambasivam
- Dasarathi Narasimhan as Vikram

== Production ==
The film noted the debut direction for director Rama Jayaprakash.

== Reception ==
Maalai Malar critic rated two point five out of five and stated that "The first half of the screenplay moves to a dilapidated bungalow, opening the door to a room that is made for ghost movies, and the scares."

Abhinav Subramanian of Times of india wrote that "Maya Puthagam is a film that promises magic but delivers mediocrity" and rated two out of five star.
