= Raraju (2006 film) =

- Movie Poster
- Directed by: Udayasankar
- Written by: Chintapally Ramana (dialogues)
- Screenplay by: Udayasankar
- Story by: Udayasankar
- Produced by: G. V. G. Raju
- Starring: Gopichand; Meera Jasmine; Ankitha
- Cinematography: Ramnath Shetty
- Edited by: Marthand K. Venkatesh
- Music by: Mani Sharma
- Production company: S.S.P. Arts
- Release date: 20 October 2006
- Running time: 135 minutes
- Country: India
- Language: Telugu

Raraju (transl. King of the King) is a 2006 Indian Telugu-language action film produced by on S.S.P. Arts banner and directed by Udayasankar. It Gopichand, Meera Jasmine, and Ankitha. K.S. Chithra makes a guest appearance in the movie. The music was composed by Mani Sharma. The film was later dubbed into Hindi as Ek Qayamat in 2007.

== Cast ==
- Gopichand as Kaali
- Meera Jasmine as Jyothi
- Ankitha as Sravani
- Sivaji as Surya
- Ashish Vidyarthi as Kotireddy Venkat Reddy
- Sumitra as Amrutham, Kaali's mother
- Brahmanandam as Seenu, Jyothi and Sravani's father
- Shanoor Sana as Parvathi, Jyothi and Sravani's mother
- Sudha as Lakshmi, Surya's mother
- Giri Babu as Rama Chandra Murthy, Kaali's father
- Chandra Mohan as Chandram, Surya's father
- Jaya Prakash Reddy as Jayprakash Garu
- Gundu Hanumantha Rao
- M.S. Narayana as Narayana
- Venu Madhav as Venu
- Chittajalu Lakshmipati as Lakshmipati
- Fish Venkat
- Junior Relangi
- Malladi Raghava
- Ranam Venu
- Apoorva
- Alapathi Lakshmi
- Kavya
- K. S. Chithra in a cameo as herself
- Kausha Rach

== Production ==
The muhurat took place on 1 October 2005 at Venkateswara temple in Srinagar Colony, Hyderabad. As of July 2006, the film shoot was complete except for songs.

== Soundtrack ==
Raraju

Film score by Mani Sharma
- Released: 2006
- Genre: Soundtrack
- Length: 20:26
- Label: Aditya Music
- Producer: Mani Sharma

Mani Sharma chronology
| Stalin (2006) | Raraju (2006) | Seethakoka Chiluka (2006) |

The film's music was composed by Mani Sharma and was released on Aditya Music Company.

| No. | Title | Lyrics | Singer(s) | Length |
|---|---|---|---|---|
| 1. | "Yentata Yentata" | Ananta Sriram | Karthik, Priya Hemesh | 3:49 |
| 2. | "Chemanthi Chemanthi" | Ananta Sriram | Karunya | 4:19 |
| 3. | "Bangaru Chilaka" | Suddala Ashok Teja | Tippu, Chitra | 4:00 |
| 4. | "Muddu Mudduga" | Chinni Charan | Ranjith, Kalyani | 3:46 |
| 5. | "Danimma" | Ananta Sriram | Shankar Mahadevan, Anuradha Sriram | 4:17 |
| Total length: | | | | 20:26 |

== Reception ==
Radhika Rajamani of Rediff.com rated the film 2/5 stars and wrote, "On the whole, Raraju is quite a clean film to watch with the family, perhaps once. The director makes an effort to make an earnest film, but can't make it drastically different, hindered somewhat by commercial trappings".
