= Murder at Teesri Manzil 302 =

2021 Indian Hindi-language murder mystery film

- Release poster
- Directed by: Navneet Baj Saini
- Written by: Navneet - Vishal
- Produced by: Asif Shaikh
- Starring: Irrfan Khan; Ranvir Shorey; Deepal Shaw; Lucky Ali; Nausheen Ali Sardar
- Cinematography: Ravi Walia
- Edited by: Irfan Ishak
- Music by: Songs: Sajid-Wajid; Background Score: Sandeep Shirodkar
- Production companies: Quantum films ltd. Practical Productions
- Distributed by: ZEE5
- Release date: 31 December 2021
- Running time: 120 minutes
- Country: India
- Language: Hindi

Murder at Teesri Manzil 302 is a 2021 Indian Hindi-language murder mystery film directed by Navneet Baj Saini, starring Irrfan Khan, Ranvir Shorey, Deepal Shaw and Lucky Ali. The film was stuck in production hell after its completion in the year 2009. Termed as one among Khan's unreleased films, finally premiered on ZEE5 on 31 December 2021, but with poor reviews. It marks a posthumous appearance for Khan following his death on 29 April 2020.

== Plot ==
A wealthy businessman's wife mysteriously disappears, and a team of investigating officers embark on a search for her. Will they be able to decipher what's going on?

== Cast ==
- Irrfan Khan as Shekhar Sharma (Sheky)
- Ranvir Shorey as Abhishek Deewan
- Deepal Shaw as Maya Deewan
- Lucky Ali as Inspector Tejendra Singh
- Nausheen Ali Sardar

== Production ==
The film began production in 2008, was completed in 2009 but was shelved for years until it premiered through ZEE5.

== Reception ==
Archika Khurana of The Times of India wrote, "In a nutshell, ‘Murder At Teesri Manzil 302’ will undoubtedly make you nostalgic for the late Irrfan Khan, but it’s definitely not one of his best films to remember." Gautaman Bhaskaran of News18 wrote, "Shot in the exotic locales of Bangkok and Pattaya, the film had remained in the cans for 14 years, and it is not clear why it chose to emerge now. Obviously, the direction and execution seem somewhat outdated, and it is not surprising that the thriller should face obstacles; its pace is broken by songs and dances. Totally needless."
