= Deepal Shaw =

Indian actress, singer and model

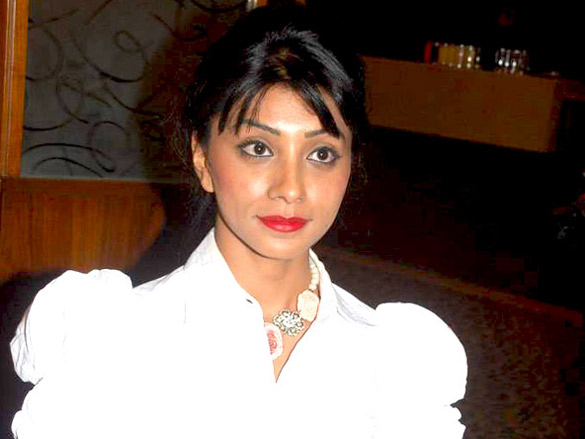
- Deepal Shaw in 2012
- Born: Mumbai, Maharashtra, India
- Occupations: Actress, model
- Years active: 2002–2011

Deepal Shaw is an Indian actress, and model who has worked in Bollywood movies.

== Early life ==
Shaw attended St. Xavier's College, where she pursued a BA in Psychology.

== Career ==
=== Career as a model ===
Shaw began her career as a model, taking part in the 2004 Miss India beauty pageant, advancing to the final round.

=== Film career ===
In December 2005, she finished filming on her second venture, Karma Aur Holi, directed by Manish Gupta. The international, English-language film stars Sushmita Sen, Randeep Hooda, and Naomi Campbell, and released in 2009. The film received overwhelming negative reviews from critics.

Deepal Shaw is known for her character 'Annie' in movie Kalyug in 2005, 'Melvyna' in movie Runway in 2009, as 'Naina Roy' in movie A Wednesday! in 2008, as 'Suman' in movie Saheb Biwi Aur Gangster in 2011. In 2021, she featured in movie Murder at Teesri Manzil 302.

== Filmography ==
Year	Title	Role	Language	Notes
2005	Kalyug	Annie	Hindi	Debut Film
2008	Chamku	Red Salwar	Hindi	
2008	A Wednesday!	Naina Roy	Hindi	
2009	Runway	Melvyna	Hindi	
2009	Karma Aur Holi		Hindi	
2009	Dhoondte Reh Jaaoge	Lolo	Hindi	
2010	Right Yaaa Wrong		Hindi	
2011	Vikalp		Hindi	
2011	Daag - Shades of Love		Hindi	
2011	Saheb, Biwi Aur Gangster		Hindi	
2012	Mere Dost Picture Abhi Baki Hai		Hindi	
2021	Murder at Teesri Manzil 302	Maya Deewan	Hindi	Delayed release; Shot in 2008-09

== Discography ==
=== Music Videos ===
Year	Album	Song	Singer	Music	Label
2004	Baby Doll Chapter 1 Come Fall In Love	Kabhi Aar Kabhi Paar Remix	Sona Mohapatra, Kunal Ganjawala	Anuj Matthews	Saregama HMV
2004	Baby Doll Chapter 2	Rangeela Re Remix	--	--	Saregama HMV
2004	Baby Doll Chapter 2	Leke Pehla Pehla Pyaar Remix	Shruti Pathak, Kunal Shah	Urban Deshi (Guru)	Saregama HMV

=== Music ===
Year	Name	Type	Label
2004	Baby Doll Chapter 1 Come Fall In Love	CD, Cassette	Saregama HMV
2003	Baby Doll Chapter 2	CD, Cassette	Saregama HMV
2003	Baby Doll Chapter 2 – 27 Hot Videos	VCD	Saregama HMV
2003	Baby Doll Fully Loaded	CD, Cassette	Saregama HMV
2004	Baby Doll Fully Loaded	VCD	Saregama HMV
2004	Baby Mega Mixes	CD, Cassette	Saregama HMV
2005	Baby Doll Hot Ones	CD, Cassette	Saregama HMV
2005	Baby Doll Hot Ones	VCD	Saregama HMV

== See also ==
- List of Indian film actresses
