= Bobbili Simham =

- Theatrical release poster
- Directed by: A. Kodandarami Reddy
- Written by: Paruchuri Brothers (dialogues)
- Screenplay by: A. Kodandarami Reddy
- Story by: V. Vijayendra Prasad
- Produced by: T. Trivikrama Rao
- Starring: Nandamuri Balakrishna; Meena; Roja
- Cinematography: A. Vincent
- Edited by: Kotagiri Venkateswara Rao
- Music by: M. M. Keeravani
- Production company: Vijayalakshmi Art Pictures
- Release date: 23 September 1994
- Running time: 144 mins
- Country: India
- Language: Telugu

Bobbili Simham (transl. Lion of Bobbili) is a 1994 Telugu-language action drama film directed by A. Kodandarami Reddy and produced by T. Trivikrama Rao under the Vijayalakshmi Art Pictures banner. It stars Nandamuri Balakrishna, Meena and Roja, with music composed by M. M. Keeravani. The film was recorded as a Super Hit at the box office.

== Plot ==
The film begins in Bobbili, where Vijaya Raghava Bhupathi is the heir to the royal family. As a child, his maternal uncle, Rayudu, makes sacrifices to protect him and preserve their clan. Twenty-five years later, Vijaya Raghava, now a just and principled man, establishes a system of impartial justice at Dharma Pettam, where he resolves disputes. His authority is challenged by Pasupathi, a ruthless tyrant, but Vijaya Raghava overpowers him.

At a village fair, a young woman named Venkata Lakshmi becomes infatuated with Vijaya Raghava. Encouraged by his grandmother, Bhuvaneswari Devi, Venkata Lakshmi pursues her feelings. However, when villains attempt to exploit Venkata Lakshmi under the guise of religion, Vijaya Raghava marries her to protect her honour. Soon, Venkata Lakshmi learns that Vijaya Raghava is already married to his cross-cousin, Sravani, and becomes enraged. Bhuvaneswari Devi then recounts the events leading to this arrangement.

Vijaya Raghava and Sravani were childhood sweethearts, and their marriage was arranged by their families. During this time, Pasupathi, in collusion with Minister Basavayya, usurps land belonging to the endowment department. Vijaya Raghava restores the land to its rightful owners and defeats Pasupathi. In retaliation, Pasupathi implicates Rayudu, an Ayurvedic doctor, in a murder. Vijaya Raghava delivers justice, leading Pasupathi to orchestrate Sravani's marriage to his elder son, Gajendra. Vijaya Raghava thwarts the scheme and marries Sravani himself.

On their wedding night, Sravani reveals her marriage is part of a vendetta against Vijaya Raghava's family for her father's death. She vows never to consummate their marriage. Overhearing this, Bhuvaneswari Devi challenges Sravani to secure an heir for the family by any means. Meanwhile, Vijaya Raghava discovers his half-sister, Ganga, the daughter of his father's second wife, Saraswathi. Ganga is in love with Pasupathi's younger son, Sivaji. Although Pasupathi pretends to approve their marriage, he orchestrates an attack on their wedding night, during which Minister Basavayya attempts to assault Ganga. Vijaya Raghava intervenes, captures the minister, and gains the Chief Minister's support, leading to Basavayya's dismissal.

As time passes, Venkata Lakshmi conceives a child, and Sravani unexpectedly rejoices. It is revealed that Sravani is terminally ill with cancer and orchestrated her actions to ensure the family's unity and legacy. Vijaya Raghava, aware of her illness, supports her, and the family comes to revere Sravani for her sacrifices.

In the climax, Sravani protects Venkata Lakshmi during an attack by Gajendra, orchestrated by Pasupathi and Basavayya. Vijaya Raghava eliminates the villains and safeguards the Chief Minister, completing a family project honouring his ancestors. The film ends with Sravani dying peacefully in Vijaya Raghava's arms, blessing the newborn heir and securing the family's future.

== Cast ==
- Nandamuri Balakrishna as Vijaya Raghava Bhupathi
- Meena as Venkata Lakshmi (voice Dubbed by Roja Ramani)
- Roja as Sravani (voice Dubbed by Saritha)
- Satyanarayana as Pasupathi
- Sarada as Bhuvaneswari Devi
- Jaggayya as CM
- Sarath Babu as Rayudu
- Kota Srinivasa Rao as Minister Basavayya
- Mohan Raj as Gajendra
- Mahesh Anand as Rowdy
- Brahmanandam as Papayya
- Tanikella Bharani as Collector Mahalingam
- Rallapalli as Kanakayya
- J. V. Somayajulu as Priest
- Sivaji Raja as Sivaji
- Chalapathi Rao as priest
- Gokina Rama Rao as Ranganna
- Ramaraju as Police Inspector
- Ananth as villager
- Chitti Babu as Book Seller
- Ironleg Sastri as villager
- Sangeetha as Saraswathi
- Sudha as Rayudu's Wife
- Madhurima as Ganga
- Pakhija as villager
- Anitha as principal

== Production ==
The film was shot at Gummalladodi village.

== Soundtrack ==
Bobbili Simham

Film score by M. M. Keeravani
- Released: 1994
- Genre: Soundtrack
- Length: 27:23
- Label: Anand Audio
- Producer: M. M. Keeravani

M. M. Keeravani chronology
Muddula Priyudu (1994)	Bobbili Simham (1994)	Subha Sankalpam (1995)

Music was composed by M. M. Keeravani. Audio was released on Akash Audio Company.

No.	Title	Lyrics	Singer(s)	Length
1.	"Paalakollu Paapa"	Veturi	S. P. Balasubrahmanyam, Chitra	4:43
2.	"Edu Ela Vesina"	Veturi	S. P. Balasubrahmanyam, Chitra	4:48
3.	"Kittammma Leela"	Veturi	S. P. Balasubrahmanyam, Chitra	4:24
4.	"Mayadari Pillada"	Veturi	Mano, Radhika	4:32
5.	"Lakadi Ka Pulata"	Veturi	S. P. Balasubrahmanyam, Chitra	4:20
6.	"Srirasthu Subhamastu"	Jaladi	S. P. Balasubrahmanyam, Chitra	4:36
Total length:				27:23
