= E-mail (film) =

2024 Indian Tamil film

- Theatrical release poster
- Directed by: SR Rajan
- Produced by: SR Rajan
- Starring: Ashok Kumar; Ragini Dwivedi
- Cinematography: Sevlam Madhappan
- Edited by: Rajesh Kumar
- Music by: Song: Avinash Gavaskar; Score: Jubin
- Production company: SR Film Factory
- Release date: 9 February 2024
- Running time: 100 minutes
- Country: India
- Language: Tamil

E-mail is a 2024 Indian Tamil-language thriller film directed by SR Rajan and starring Ashok Kumar and Ragini Dwivedi. The film talks about the ill effects of online gaming scams. The film was released on 9 February 2024.

== Cast ==
- Ashok Kumar as Vimal
- Ragini Dwivedi as Abhi
- Aadhav Balaji as Ganesh
- Aarti Shree as Reshma
- Manobala as Kailasam
- Lollu Sabha Manohar as Sundar
- Billy Murali as Shiva
- Akshay Raj as Karthik

== Production ==
The film was shot on beaches in Chennai, Goa, Karnataka and Pondicherry.

== Soundtrack ==
The soundtrack was composed by Avinash Gavaskar.

E-mail

Soundtrack album by Avinash Gavaskar
- Released: 2024
- Genre: Feature film soundtrack
- Length: 6:38
- Language: Tamil
- Producer: Avinash Gavaskar

Avinash Gavaskar chronology
Memories (2023)	E-mail (2024)	The Smile Man (2025)

track listing
No.	Title	Lyrics	Singer(s)	Length
1.	"Cindrella"	Anbuchezhian	Vishnu Ram, Shobika	3:09
2.	"Velvet Baby"	Anbuchezhian	Sanjana Kalmanje	3:29
Total length:				6:38

== Reception ==
Roopa Radhakrishnan from The Times of India rated the film 1 1/2 out of 5 and wrote that "Charlie's Angels is a film that already falls into the guilty pleasure category. So, basically, Email is the guilty pleasure version of an already existing guilty pleasure". A critic from Thinaboomi wrote that director SR Rajan, who told the story focused on the dangers of online games with suspense and many unpredictable twists, could have told its effects a little more clearly.
