= Ashok Kumar (Tamil actor) =

Indian actor

- Born: Ashok Kumar Balakrishnan; India
- Other name: Muruga Ashok
- Occupation: Actor
- Years active: 1993; 2007–present

Ashok Kumar Balakrishnan is an Indian actor who has appeared predominantly in Tamil films.

== Career ==
Originally from Thanjavur district, Ashok Kumar grew up in Mumbai. He was a Bharatanatyam dancer and won the Nrithyamayoor (transl. Dancing Peacock) Award from the Government of Maharashtra. He played Krishna in the Hindi television serial Krishna (1993–97). His film debut but was supposed to be Dishyum (2006), but he was subsequently removed from the film and replaced by Jiiva. He then made his feature film debut with R. T. Neason's Muruga (2007) and starred in Pidichirukku the following year. He made a special appearance as a Tamil actor in a song from the Malayalam film Mulla (2008). Ashok made his Telugu debut with the bilingual Kaki (2015), which was made by Vetrimaaran's assistant director. The film was released in Tamil two years later as Ka Ka Ka: Aabathin Arikuri (2017).

In 2019, he appeared in the multi-starrer movies such as Chithiram Pesuthadi 2 and Gangs of Madras. He also acted in the Malaysian film Unakkagathane released in 2020. He was seen in the crime series Kuruthi Kalam (2021) which was released on MX Player. In 2022, Ashok Kumar was seen successively in horror films such as Vidiyatha Iravondru Vendum, Bestie, and Mayathirai. In 2023, he was appeared in the action thriller, Vizhithelu. In 2024, he was appeared in the drama thriller E-mail.as well as part of a Kannada project called Sambhavami Yuge Yuge, and the fantasy thriller, Maya Puthagam. The, Ashok Kumar appeared in Lara (2025).

== Filmography ==
=== Films ===
- All films are in Tamil, unless otherwise noted.

List of Ashok Kumar film credits
Year	Film	Role	Notes
2007	Muruga	Murugan	
2008	Pidichirukku	Velu	
2008	Mulla	Himself	Malayalam film; cameo appearance
2012	Kozhi Koovuthu	Kumaresan	
2013	Vetkathai Kettal Enna Tharuvaai	Shiva	
2014	Kadhal Solla Aasai	Mahesh	
2015	Kaki	Karthik	Telugu film
2017	Ka Ka Ka: Aabathin Arikuri	Karthik	
2019	Chithiram Pesuthadi 2	Salim	
2019	Gangs of Madras	Ibrahim	
2020	Unakkagathane	Ashok Singh	Malaysian film
2022	Vidiyatha Iravondru Vendum	Kathir	
2022	Bestie	Ashok	
2022	Mayathirai	Jeeva	
2022	4554	Karthi	
2022	Therkathi Veeran	Vasanth	
2023	Vizhithelu	Sivakumar	
2023	Priyamudan Priya	Markendya	
2023	Are You Ok Baby?	Thyagi	
2024	E-mail	Vimal	
2024	Sambhavami Yuge Yuge	Krishna	Kannada film
2024	Maya Puthagam	Guru	
2025	Lara	Maharoof	
2026	Thiraivi	Vikram	

=== Television ===
List of Ashok Kumar television credits
Year	Title	Role	Language	Channel	Notes	Ref.
1993	Shri Krishna	Child Krishna	Hindi	DD National	Debut TV show Best Child Actor Award	
2021	Kuruthi Kalam	Item Kumar	Tamil	MX Player		
2024 - 2025	Mounam Pesiyadhe	Shiva	Tamil	Zee Tamil		
