= Sarada Bullodu =

Saradha Bullodu
- Theatrical release poster
- Directed by: Ravi Raja Pinisetty
- Written by: V. Vijayendra Prasad (story / dialogues)
- Screenplay by: Ravi Raja Pinisetty
- Produced by: T. Trivikrama Rao
- Starring: Venkatesh; Nagma
- Cinematography: K. Ravindra Babu
- Edited by: Vellaiswamy
- Music by: Koti
- Production company: Vijayalakshmi Art Pictures
- Release date: 9 August 1996
- Running time: 136 minutes
- Country: India
- Language: Telugu

Saradha Bullodu is a 1996 Indian Telugu-language drama film directed by Ravi Raja Pinisetty and produced by T. Trikrama Rao under the Vijayalakshmi Art Pictures banner. It stars Venkatesh and Nagma playing the lead roles, with music composed by Koti. The film was recorded as a flop at the box office. It was dubbed into Tamil as Enga Oor Singam.

== Plot ==
Vijay, an engineer in AP Oils, lives with his widowed mother Shanta. He finds out that there are oil wells near Attamadugu village. Sangliyana, a businessman, offers him a large bribe and tells him to capture those oil wells but Vijay refuses to yield and warns Sangliyana. Vijay reaches Attamadugu and starts work.

Rajeswari Devi, a greedy, cruel and crooked woman is the head of Attamadugu, whose word is law for the villagers. In fact, the property that she is enjoying belongs to her brother Jaya Chandra, who is a drunkard. Rajeswari Devi keeps him locked in a room and treats his daughter Lakshmi as a servant. Vijay always gives a tough fight to Rajeswari Devi and teases her daughter Nirmala Devi. But somehow Vijay feels that Lakshmi is his own sister.

Meanwhile, Rajeswari Devi joins hands with Sangliyana and they make a plan to kill Vijay. Lakshmi overhears their plan and informs Vijay before they attack him, thereby protecting Vijay. Rajeswari Devi decides to punish Lakshmi by arranging her marriage with another servant. Vijay stops this event and scolds Rajeswari Devi. Then, Rajeswari Devi says that no one will marry Lakshmi because her mother is a prostitute and shows her a photograph, which crushes Vijay, because that photograph belongs to none other than his mother Shanta. Vijay returns to his hometown and asks his mother why she is living like a widow when her husband is alive. Then she reveals the past.

Jaya Chandra was the original arbitrator of the village and was greatly respected by villagers. Rajeswari Devi was jealous of his popularity and eager to usurp his authority. So, she tricked Shanta and accused her of having an extramarital affair in front of the villagers. Hence, Jaya Chandra pronounced the judgment that she should be widowed by removing her wedding chain (Mangalsutra), bangles and sectarian mark (Bottu). Shanta tries to kill herself, but Vijay saved her and both of them left the village.

Now, Vijay decides to teach Rajeswari Devi a lesson. Meanwhile, Nirmala Devi also discovers the truth and starts to love Vijay. With her help, Vijay plays the same game with Rajeswari Devi and makes her publicly admit the injustice she had done to his mother. Jaya Chandra also feels remorseful and all of them go to bring Shanta back home. Meanwhile, Sangliyana kidnaps her. Finally, Vijay kills Sangliyana. In the attack, Jaya Chandra is injured and he gives the sectarian mark to Shanta with his blood. Rajeswari Devi also realizes her mistakes, apologizes to everyone and the film ends with the marriage of Vijay and Nirmala Devi.

== Cast ==
- Venkatesh as Vijay
- Nagma as Nirmala Devi
- Sanghavi as Yamini
- Satyanarayana
- Murali Mohan as Jaya Chandra
- Mohan Raj as Sangliyana
- Srihari as Sangliyana's henchman
- Kota Srinivasa Rao as Siva Rao
- Bramhanandam as Brahmam
- Ali as Siva Rao's son
- M. S. Narayana as Passenger
- M. Balaiyah as Chief Engineer
- Narra Venkateswara Rao as Minister
- Dham as T. C.
- Manjula as Rajeswari Devi
- Sangeeta as Shanta
- Madhurima Narla as Lakshmi
- Y. Vijaya as Siva Rao's wife

== Soundtrack ==
Sarada Bullodu

Soundtrack album by Koti
- Released: 1996
- Genre: Soundtrack
- Length: 29:18
- Label: T-Series
- Producer: Koti

Koti chronology
Hello Neeku Naaku Pellanta (1996)	Sarada Bullodu (1996)	Akka Bavunnava (1996)

Music composed by Koti. Music released on T-Series Audio Company.

No.	Title	Lyrics	Singer(s)	Length
1.	"Ranga Ranga Singaranga"	Sirivennela Sitarama Sastry	S. P. Balasubrahmanyam, Chitra	5:18
2.	"Daani Vayyaram"	Sirivennela Sitarama Sastry	S. P. Balasubrahmanyam, Chitra	4:22
3.	"Chitha Karthelo Chinukulu"	Bhuvanachandra	S. P. Balasubrahmanyam, Chitra	5:05
4.	"Mogindoyammo Sruthi"	Sirivennela Sitarama Sastry	S. P. Balasubrahmanyam, Chitra	5:23
5.	"Naatu Kodi Pettoyamma"	Bhuvanachandra	S. P. Balasubrahmanyam, Chitra	4:52
6.	"Gilele Gilele Gilele"	Sirivennela Sitarama Sastry	S. P. Balasubrahmanyam, Chitra	4:18
Total length:				29:18
