= Waqt Ki Awaz =

- Promotional Poster
- Directed by: K. Bapayya
- Written by: Kader Khan (dialogues)
- Screenplay by: Gyandev Agnihotri
- Story by: Paruchuri Brothers
- Based on: Khaidi Rudraiah by Paruchuri Brothers
- Produced by: T. Trivikrama Rao
- Starring: Mithun Chakraborty; Sridevi; Moushumi Chatterjee
- Cinematography: A. Venkat
- Edited by: V. R. Kotagiri
- Music by: Bappi Lahiri
- Production company: Vijayalakshmi Art Pictures
- Release date: 1 July 1988
- Running time: 155 minutes
- Country: India
- Language: Hindi

Waqt Ki Awaz (transl. The Sound of Time) is a 1988 Indian Hindi-language action drama film directed by K. Bapayya. The film stars Mithun Chakraborty and Sridevi. Moushumi Chatterjee, Kader Khan, Shakti Kapoor, Ranjeet, Gulshan Grover and Asrani are featured in supporting roles. The film was a major commercial success, becoming the fifth highest-grossing film of 1988. The film was a remake of the 1986 Telugu film Khaidi Rudraiah.

== Plot ==
Wealthy Lata refuses to obey her widower father's instructions to marry equally wealthy Rajan, who is the second son of Sikander Lal Thakkar, her dad's business partner. She runs away from home, and shortly thereafter, her father locates her living with a truck-driver, Vishwa Pratap, and his pretty sister, Lakshmi. She refuses to return home. She tells her father that she would marry Vishwa instead of Rajan. She soon regrets her decision when she finds out that Vishwa has been arrested for killing a man named Billa, and may have to spend his entire life behind bars or be hanged.

== Cast ==
- Mithun Chakraborty as Vishwa Pratap
- Sridevi as Lata Prasad
- Moushumi Chatterjee as Justice Sharda
- Ranjeet as Shera
- Kader Khan as Sikandar Lal Thakkar
- Shreeram Lagoo as Ishwar Prasad
- Gulshan Grover as Rajan Thakkar
- Shakti Kapoor as Makhan Thakkar
- Prema Narayan as Mala Thakkar
- Aruna Irani as Chanda
- Yunus Parvez as Public Prosecutor Saxena
- Asrani as Chirag
- Vikas Anand as Jailor Mohan
- Jack Gaud as Shamsher, Sikander's goon
- Ram Mohan as Ram Avatar

== Soundtrack ==
The soundtrack contains the last recorded song by Kishore Kumar. It is a duet with Asha Bhosle and was recorded a day before his death. The song is titled "Guru Guru, Aa Jao Guru". Lyrics by Indeevar.

Song	Singer
"I Want To Hit Somebody, I Want To Love Somebody"	Kishore Kumar, Asha Bhosle
"Ladki Akeli, Tu Bhi Akela, Main Bhi Albeli, Tu Bhi Albela"	Kishore Kumar, Asha Bhosle
"Guru Guru, Aa Jao Guru, Pyar Mein Doob Jao Guru"	Kishore Kumar, Asha Bhosle
"Tu Bhi Bekaraar, Main Bhi Bekaraar"	Asha Bhosle, Mohammed Aziz
"Ek Do Teen Chaar, Pyar Chahiye Kitni Baar"	Alisha Chinai, Sudesh Bhosle

== Box office ==
The film was a super hit and fifth-highest-grossing movie of 1988.
