= Rowdy Inspector =

- Theatrical release poster
- Directed by: B. Gopal
- Written by: Paruchuri Brothers (dialogues)
- Screenplay by: A. Anjineeya Pushpanand
- Story by: A. Anjineeya Pushpanand
- Produced by: T. Trivikrama Rao
- Starring: Nandamuri Balakrishna; Vijayashanti
- Cinematography: V. S. R. Swamy
- Edited by: Kotagiri Venkateswara Rao
- Music by: Bappi Lahiri
- Production company: Vijayalakshmi Art Pictures
- Release date: 7 May 1992
- Running time: 144 minutes
- Country: India
- Language: Telugu
- Box office: ₹10 crore distributors' share

Rowdy Inspector is a 1992 Telugu-language action film directed by B. Gopal and produced by T. Trivikrama Rao under the Vijayalakshmi Art Pictures. It stars Nandamuri Balakrishna, and Vijayashanti in the pivotal roles with the music composed by Bappi Lahiri.

The film was dubbed in Tamil as Auto Rani with a comedy subplot involving Senthil.

Rowdy Inspector was a blockbuster at the box office.

== Cast ==
- Nandamuri Balakrishna as Inspector Ramaraju
- Vijayashanti as Auto Rani
- Jaggayya as D.I.G. Jaganath Rao
- Captain Raju as S.P.
- Mohan Raj as Bobarlanka Ramabrahmam
- Kota Srinivasa Rao as Home Minister Karanam Kaasiah
- Brahmanandam as L. K. Balu
- Ali as Gotham
- Nutan Prasad as Judge
- Saikumar as Narasimham
- Srihari as Koti
- Rakhi as Rakhi
- Harish as Gandhi
- Vijaya Rangaraju as Drunker
- Arun Kumar as Master
- Annapurna as Parvathamma
- Kinnera as Constable Kanaka
- Pakija as Appadala Appamma
- Sairadha as Aasha
- Madhurima as Girija
- Hema as Jyothi
- Nirmalamma as Ramaraju's grandmother

== Soundtrack ==
Music composed by Bappi Lahiri. Lyrics written by Bhuvanachandra. Music released on Lahari Music Company. The song "Arey O Sambha" was recreated for Pataas (2015) by Sai Karthik.

Track listing
No.	Title	Singer(s)	Length
1.	"Dikki Dikki"	S. P. Balasubrahmanyam, Chitra	5:29
2.	"Are O Sambha"	S. P. Balasubrahmanyam, Chitra	5:40
3.	"Takkutamara Bandi"	S. P. Balasubrahmanyam, Chitra	6:10
4.	"Neelala Ningi"	S. P. Balasubrahmanyam, Chitra	5:34
5.	"Chitapata Chinukulu"	S. P. Balasubrahmanyam, Chitra	4:40
6.	"O Paapayo"	S. P. Balasubrahmanyam, Chitra	6:11
Total length:			33:50
