= Kalisundam Raa =

2000 film by K. R. Udayasankar

- Theatrical poster
- Directed by: Udayasankar
- Written by: Paruchuri Brothers (dialogues)
- Screenplay by: Udayasankar
- Story by: Deenaraj; Udayasankar
- Produced by: D. Suresh Babu; D. Rama Naidu (presents)
- Starring: Venkatesh; Simran; K. Viswanath
- Cinematography: K. Ravindra Babu
- Edited by: Marthand K. Venkatesh; K.Madhav
- Music by: S. A. Rajkumar
- Production company: Suresh Productions
- Release date: 14 January 2000
- Country: India
- Language: Telugu
- Budget: ₹10 crore (US$1.0 million)
- Box office: ₹26.7 crore (US$2.8 million)

Kalisundham Raa (transl. Come, Let's Be Together) is a 2000 Indian Telugu-language romantic family drama film directed by K. R. Udayasankar and produced by D. Suresh Babu. It stars Venkatesh, Simran and K. Viswanath, with music composed by S. A. Rajkumar. It received the National Film Award for Best Feature Film in Telugu at the 47th National Film Awards. The film won four Nandi Awards by the Government of Andhra Pradesh. The film was remade in Hindi as Kuch Tum Kaho Kuch Hum Kahein (2002) and in Kannada as Ondagona Baa (2003).

== Plot ==
Raghavayya and Ram Mohan Rao are brothers-in-law, but they are at loggerheads due to a long-standing family feud. Raghavayya, nearing his 60s, is preparing for his Sashtipoorti ceremony. At his wife's request, he decides to invite his daughter-in-law and grandchildren, who live in Bombay, for the first time. Among them is Raghu, Raghavayya's estranged but handsome grandson.

When Raghu arrives in Ramapuram from Bombay, he faces embarrassment from Raghavayya's family members. During his stay, he meets Manga, a charming and spirited young woman. The two engage in playful pranks, which gradually blossom into a deep but unspoken love. Despite their growing affection, neither confesses their feelings. Through his kindness and unconditional love, Raghu wins the trust and hearts of the family.

Over time, Raghu uncovers the root of the feud between the families of Raghavayya and Ram Mohan Rao. Years ago, Raghu's father, Bhaskar Rao, was expected to marry Ram Mohan Rao's daughter, Rajani. However, Bhaskar was in love with his college classmate, Kousalya, and left for Bombay to marry her. Heartbroken, Rajani chose to end her life, leading Ram Mohan Rao to blame Raghavayya for the tragedy and treat him coldly. Ram Mohan Rao's fiery son, Erra Babu, also harbors resentment toward Raghavayya and seeks revenge.

Through careful and timely interventions, Raghu manages to reconcile the two families. To strengthen their bond, they arrange Manga's marriage to Ram Mohan Rao's grandson. In a selfless act, Raghu sacrifices his love for Manga to ensure everyone's happiness. However, as preparations for Manga's wedding are underway, she suddenly goes missing.

The family eventually learns of Raghu and Manga's love for each other. Realizing his mistakes, Erra Babu supports their union, and the two lovers are finally brought together.

== Cast ==
- Venkatesh as Raghu
- Simran as Manga
- K. Viswanath as Raghavayya
- Srihari as Erra Babu
- Brahmanandam as Ramavadhani
- Ali as Snake Man
- AVS as Venkatadri
- M. S. Narayana as Lawyer Lingam
- Ahuti Prasad as Shankar Rao
- Ranganath as Ram Mohan Rao
- Rallapalli as Govindu
- Prasad Babu as Prasad
- Vinod as Siva
- Achyuth as Bhaskar Rao
- Raja Ravindra as Ram Mohan Rao's son-in-law
- Ananth as Constable
- Chitti Babu as Subbavadhani
- Gundu Hanumantha Rao as Barber
- Gautam Raju as Peon
- Chandra Mouli
- Madhusudhan Rao as Rowdy
- Jenny as Priest
- Annapurna as Janaki
- Vennira Aadai Nirmala as Kousalya
- Rama Prabha as Kantham
- C. R. Vijayakumari as Aliveelu Mangatayaru
- Vinaya Prasad as Anasuya
- Sudha as Raghu's aunty
- Kalpana Rai as Rathalu
- Shanoor Sana as Parvathi
- Malika as Raghu's aunty
- Kalpana
- Meena Kumari as Rajani
- Harika as Sirisha
- Deepika
- Manoja
- Lata
- Master Sajja Teja as Sandeep
- Master Aajaa Mohar
- Master Kireethi
- Master Pavan
- Master Aseem
- Baby Sindhura
- Baby Bhagyasri

== Music ==
Kalisundam Raa

Film score by S. A. Rajkumar
- Released: 1999
- Recorded: 1999
- Genre: Soundtrack
- Length: 29:37
- Label: Supreme Music
- Producer: S. A. Rajkumar

S. A. Rajkumar chronology
'Bobbili Vamsham' (1999)	Kalisundam Raa (2000)	'Maa Annayya' (2000)

Music was composed by S. A. Rajkumar and released by Supreme Music Company.

No.	Title	Lyrics	Singer(s)	Length
1.	"Pacific Lo"	Chandrabose	Udit Narayan, Anuradha Sriram	4:16
2.	"Nuvve Nuvve"	Sirivennela Sitaramasastri	Hariharan, Sujatha	4:23
3.	"Prema Prema"	Sirivennela Sitaramasastri	Unni Krishnan	1:59
4.	"Manasu Manasu"	Veturi	S. P. Balasubrahmanyam, Chitra	4:40
5.	"Kalisunte Kaladusukam"	Veturi	Rajesh Krishnan	4:42
6.	"Boom Boom"	Chandrabose	Shankar Mahadevan	5:05
7.	"Nachave Palapitta"	Chandrabose	S. P. Balasubrahmanyam, Swarnalatha	4:11
Total length:				29:37

== Reception ==
Jeevi of Idlebrain.com wrote "This film belongs the genre of Ninne Pelladatha. The impact it gives to the viewer is more than that of Ninne Pelladatha, in fact. Raj's characterization in DDLJ suits the 'Raghu' characterization in this film. An optimist and unconditional good-doer he is, 'Raghu' wins the hearts of all family members and the viewers".

== Box office ==
Kalisundham Raa broke several records in Telugu cinema. It ran for a record 100 days, 175 days and 200 days.

== Awards ==
National Film Awards

- National Film Award for Best Feature Film in Telugu

Filmfare Awards

- Filmfare Special Jury Award for Best Actor - Venkatesh

Nandi Awards

- Best Feature Film - Gold - D. Suresh Babu
- Best Actor - Venkatesh
- Best Supporting Actor - K. Vishwanath
- Best Story Writer - Dinraj and Uday Shankar

Film fan's Association Awards

- Best Feature Film - D. Suresh Babu
- Best Actor - Venkatesh
- Best Actress - Simran

== Remakes ==
The film was remade in Hindi as Kuch Tum Kaho Kuch Hum Kahein (2002) by Suresh Productions and in Kannada as Ondagona Baa by Udayashankar himself.
