= Thavasi =

2001 film by K. R. Udayasankar

- DVD cover
- Directed by: Udayasankar
- Screenplay by: Udayasankar
- Story by: Chinni Krishna
- Produced by: Jayaprakash; V. Gnanavel
- Starring: Vijayakanth; Soundarya; Jayasudha
- Cinematography: S. K. Boopathi
- Edited by: B. S. Vasu–Saleem
- Music by: Vidyasagar
- Production company: GJ Cinema
- Release date: 14 November 2001
- Running time: 165 minutes
- Country: India
- Language: Tamil

Thavasi (/θəvəsi/) is a 2001 Indian Tamil-language action drama film directed by Udayasankar starring Vijayakanth in dual lead roles as father and son, with Soundarya, Vadivelu, Jayasudha, Prathyusha, Nassar and Sriman playing other pivotal roles. The film was released on 14 November 2001, and received mixed reviews from critics but was a hit at the box office. The film was remade in Kannada as Mallikarjuna (2011).

== Plot ==
Thavasi is an influential do-gooder landlord in a small village, who commands respect from the village. Thavasi and his wife arrange for their son Boopathi's marriage with Priyadarshini. Sankarapandi, who raped and killed Thavasi's sister after marrying her, wants to marry his daughter (whom he had with his second wife) to Boopathi. Thavasi, since he doesn't want his son to marry his daughter, insults Sankarapandi. Sankarapandi instead of saving his prestige, engages her daughter with Maragathammal's son Thangarasu, who is present there. Boopathi's engagement is done with Priyadarshini, with both of them liking each other after many chance encounters. Thangarasu is accused of stealing temple owned jewels, and Thavasi judges him to be guilty. The next day, Thangarasu commits suicide. It is implied that Thangarasu is innocent and took his own life since he couldn't live with the blame. Later, a mute person is arrested as the person who stole the jewel. Hearing this Thangarasu's mother Maragathammal questions Thavasi's judgement, which was said to never be wrong. Thavasi decides to give away his own son Boopathi to Maragathammal, for his injustice to her son. Maragathammal despises Boopathi and treats him badly, though he tolerates it. Sankarapandi wants his daughter to marry Boopathi, who is now the son of Maragathammal, as engaged. Boopathi, unknown to Maragathammal, saves Thanagarasu's imbecile sister from Maragathammal's brother Kottai Perumal's sexual assaulting and also reforms Karmegam, who is the brother-in-law of Thangarasu, who constantly tortures his wife for due dowry. In a chance encounter before his marriage with Sankarapandi's daughter, he meets the mute thief and realises that he acted as a mute. He captures him and makes him confess that Sankarapandi was responsible for the theft of Temple's jewel and Thangarasu's murder, who made it look like suicide. In the end, Boopathi marries Priya and Priya gets pregnant with twins.

== Cast ==
- Vijayakanth in a dual role as
  - Thavasi
  - Boopathi, Thavasi's son
- Soundarya as Priyadarshini, Boopathi love interest
- Jayasudha as Thavasi's wife (Boopathi's mother)
- Prathyusha as Nandhini
- Sriman as Thangarasu, Maragathammal's son
- Nassar as Sankarapandi
- Vadivelu as Azhagu
- Delhi Ganesh as Accountant
- Nizhalgal Ravi as Rajadurai, Priyadarshini's father
- Gandhimathi as Priyadarshini's grandmother
- Vadivukkarasi as Maragathammal, Thangarasu's mother
- Kuyili as Sankarapandi's wife
- Eswari Rao as Gowri, Maragathammal's daughter
- Soumiya as Soumiya, Priya's friend
- Aishwarya as Kaveri, Maragathammal's daughter
- Ponnambalam as Kottai Perumal, Maragathammal's brother
- Thyagu as Sankarapandi's henchman
- Mahanadi Shankar as Ezhumalai
- Ilavarasu as Karmegam, Maragathammal's son-in-law
- Soundar as Auto rickshaw driver
- Mayilsamy as Fraud
- G. V. Sudhakar Naidu as Sundarapandian
- Rajkumar as Chinna Pandi
- Sempuli Jagan as Kannaian
- Rajajirajan as Man vomiting blood
- Scissor Manohar as Servant
- Set Govindaraj as Govind
- Sampath Ram as Thief
- A. C. Murali Mohan as Collector
- Master Naveen as Naughty boy
- Shathiga as Gowri's daughter
- Krishnamoorthy as Mentally challenged man
- Bonda Mani as Shop owner
- Muthukaalai as Coconut seller
- Jayamani as Son of the dead father
- Kottachi as Villager
- Citizen Mani as Villager
- Karnaa Radha as Villager

== Production ==
The first filming schedule of Thavasi started in Chennai and continued in Pollachi and Udumalpet. The song sequences involving Vijayakanth and Soundarya were shot in Munnar, Palakkad, Cunnoor and Kodaikanal. Kumbakonam Mahamaham tank was specially designed for the film as its grandest set. Around 10,000 extras participated in the holy dip. Around 30 artistes performed them while nine cameras whirred from all directions to roll. The introductory scene of Vijayakanth was captured with 12 cameras while his introductory song was shot at Thirubuvanam temple at Kumbakonam. The director revealed in 2023 that Seeman wrote the dialogues but went uncredited as Seeman felt crediting himself as writer would result in him not receiving further directorial opportunities.

== Soundtrack ==
Soundtrack was composed by Vidyasagar.

Song title	Singers	Lyrics
"Thanthana Thanthana Thaimasam"	K. J. Yesudas, Sadhana Sargam	P. Vijay
"Desingh Raja Thaan"	S. P. Balasubrahmanyam, Sujatha Mohan	P. Vijay
"Yelai Imayamalai"	Manickka Vinayakam	P. Vijay
"Ethanai Ethanai"	Shankar Mahadevan, S. Janaki	Kabilan
"Panjaangam Paarakadhe"	Srivardhini, Chitra Sivaraman, Shankar Mahadevan	Palani Bharathi

== Reception ==
The film received mixed reviews but still became a box office hit.

Tulika of Rediff.com wrote, "Trouble is, everyone of them have gone through the selfsame motions so often in the past that they seem to sleepwalk through this film, doing their stuff by rote and with little conviction. The crisis is predictable, ditto the denouement. And the fights, songs and comedy tracks that bridge crisis and denouement fail to grip."

Visual Dasan of Kalki felt by choosing this film Vijayakanth only stabbed the ear of his fan bleeding and further added the aspects that makes audience to watch this film with much patience is Udhayashankar's screenplay with no loopholes, Vidyasagar's music, Vadivelu's humour, performances of Vijayakanth, Jayasudha, Soundarya and Ilavarasu.

Sify wrote "Grrr, Grash bash another typical Vijaykanth masala with the star in a double role. One the old man Thavasi and other is the ordinary role of the son Bhupathy. It is the same old ‘Natamai’ or feudal system as the theme with the village panchayat scenario thrown in plus the usual melodrama".

Chennai Online wrote "The first half is fairly engaging, but the second half tends to lag".

== Accolades ==
2001 Tamil Nadu State Film Awards

- Best Comedian – Vadivelu
- Best Music Director – Vidyasagar (also for his music in Dhill and Poovellam Un Vasam)
