= Ragile Jwala =

- Theatrical release poster
- Directed by: K. Raghavendra Rao
- Produced by: T. Trivikrama Rao
- Starring: Krishnam Raju; Jaya Prada; Sujatha
- Music by: K. Chakravarthy
- Production company: Vijayalakshmi Art Pictures
- Release date: 6 August 1981
- Country: India
- Language: Telugu

Ragile Jwala (transl. Burning flame) is a 1981 Telugu language action drama film directed by K. Raghavendra Rao and produced by T. Trivikrama Rao under Vijayalakshmi Art Pictures. The film stars Krishnam Raju, Jaya Prada and Sujatha. The music was composed by Chakravarthy. The film was a box office success.

== Cast ==
- Krishnam Raju as Krishna / Raja
- Jaya Prada as Vani
- Sujatha as Lakshmi
- Kaikala Satyanarayana
- Nagabhushanam as Bhushanam
- Rao Gopal Rao as Dharma Raju
- Jaggayya
- Pushpalata
- Jhansi
- Allu Rama Lingaiah as Kanakaiah
- Jaya Malini as Radha
- Chalapathi Rao
- Giri Babu
- Suthi Veerabhadra Rao
- Potti Prasad

== Soundtrack ==
Soundtrack was composed by K. Chakravarthy.

- Muddabanti Puvvamma" - P. Susheela, S. P. Balasubrahmanyam
- "Totamalini" - P.Susheela, S. P. Balasubramanyam
- "Emdayyo Tambulalo" - P.Susheela, S. P. Balasubramanyam
- "Naa Jeevana" - S. P. Balasubramanyam, P. Susheela
- "Chinuku Padite" - S. P. Balasubramanyam, P. Susheela
- "Topukada Kostava" - S. P. Balasubramanyam, P. Susheela
