= Ondagona Baa =

2003 Kannada film by K. R. Udhayashankar

- Directed by: K. R. Udhayashankar
- Written by: K. R. Udhayashankar
- Based on: Kalisundam Raa (2000)
- Produced by: Rockline Venkatesh
- Starring: V. Ravichandran; Shilpa Shetty
- Cinematography: G. S. V. Seetharam
- Edited by: Jo Ni Harsha
- Music by: Hamsalekha
- Production company: Rockline Productions
- Release date: 23 October 2003
- Running time: 155 minutes
- Country: India
- Language: Kannada

Ondagona Baa (transl. Come, Let's Be One) is a 2003 Indian Kannada-language romance drama film directed by K. R. Udhayashankar and produced by Rockline Venkatesh. The film stars V. Ravichandran and Shilpa Shetty. Yester-year veteran actors J. V. Somayajulu and K. R. Vijaya too feature in prominent roles. The film also marked the reunion of actor Ravichandran with music composer Hamsalekha who had parted ways due to some differences for many years. It is a remake of the Telugu film Kalisundam Raa.

The film created much hype before its release due to the reunion of veterans on the screen after a long time. Critics appreciated the film for its family-based theme and decent music.

== Cast ==
- V. Ravichandran as Raghu
- Shilpa Shetty as Belli
- J. V. Somayajulu as Raghavayya
- K. R. Vijaya
- Tara
- Charan Raj
- Doddanna
- Mukhyamantri Chandru
- Sundar Raj
- Shivaram
- Vanitha Vasu
- Sathyapriya
- Pavitra Lokesh
- Pramila Joshai
- Chitra Shenoy
- Tennis Krishna
- M. N. Lakshmi Devi
- Mandeep Roy
- Bank Janardhan

== Production ==
Ravichandran and Shilpa Shetty were earlier paired in Preethsod Thappa. Shetty agreed to be a part of the film due to Ravichandran and cameraman Seetharam. Part of the film was shot in Manipal and Rockline Studios outside Bengaluru, which was yet to be inaugurated.

== Soundtrack ==
All the songs are composed and written by Hamsalekha, who previously worked together in Preethsod Thappa and did not collaborate for a period due to an alleged feud.

| Sl No | Song title | Singer(s) | Lyrics |
|---|---|---|---|
| 1 | "Yaaro Yaaro" | Anoop Seelin, Nanditha | Hamsalekha |
| 2 | "Ond Hejje Naave" | Fayaz | Hamsalekha |
| 3 | "Eno Modi Madide" | Rajesh Krishnan, Nanditha | Hamsalekha |
| 4 | "Ragi Mudde Murisi" | S. P. Balasubrahmanyam, Anuradha Sriram | Hamsalekha |
| 5 | "Lovvisu Nanna" | Rajesh Krishnan, Mahalaxmi Iyer | Hamsalekha |
| 6 | "Ondagiddare Ella" | S. P. Balasubrahmanyam | Hamsalekha |
| 7 | "Ajja Aalad Mara" | S. P. Balasubrahmanyam, K. S. Chithra | Hamsalekha |
| 8 | "Preethi Mounavagide" | Madhu Balakrishnan | Hamsalekha |

== Reception ==
A critic from Viggy.com wrote, "Ondagona Baa is a good family flick with decent music, tickling comedy, balanced mixture of happiness and sorrow. Ravichandran and Shilpa Shetty looks good without disappointing the film lovers as there was a high expectation on this combination".
