= Ashok Saxena =

Indian-American materials scientist and academic

- Saxena from the University of Arkansas
- Born: c. 1948
- Known for: Time-dependent fracture mechanics; creep and creep-fatigue crack growth
- Awards: George R. Irwin Medal (ASTM, 1992); ASTM Award of Merit and Fellow (1994); Fellow, ASM International (1996); Wöhler Medal (European Structural Integrity Society, 2010); Fracture Mechanics Medal (ASTM, 2010); Paul C. Paris Gold Medal (International Congress on Fracture, 2017)

Academic background
- Education: Indian Institute of Technology Kanpur (B.Tech); University of Cincinnati (M.S., Ph.D.)

Academic work
- Institutions: Westinghouse Corporate R&D Center; University of Arkansas; Georgia Institute of Technology; WireTough Cylinders, LLC

Ashok Saxena (born c. 1948) is an Indian-American materials scientist and academic whose research focuses on fracture mechanics, including time-dependent fracture mechanics, creep crack growth, and creep-fatigue interactions in structural materials. He has held faculty and administrative positions at the Georgia Institute of Technology and the University of Arkansas, and has received awards from ASTM International, the European Structural Integrity Society, and the International Congress on Fracture.

== Education ==
Saxena received a B.Tech. degree in mechanical engineering from the Indian Institute of Technology Kanpur in 1970. He earned an M.S. in 1972 and a Ph.D. in 1974, both in materials science and metallurgical engineering, from the University of Cincinnati.

== Career ==
Following his doctorate, Saxena worked in industry, including positions at National Steel Corporation and at the Westinghouse Corporate R&D Center in Pittsburgh, where he rose to the rank of Fellow Scientist (mid-1970s to 1985). He has described the Westinghouse group as the place where he received his professional start and outstanding mentorship, and as the premier research group in the world for fracture-mechanics research at that time.

In 1985 he joined the School of Materials Science and Engineering at the Georgia Institute of Technology as a professor. He served as director of the Composites Education and Research Center (1991-1994) and as chair of the school from 1993 to 2002. He was named a Regents’ Professor in 2002.

In 2003 Saxena became dean of the College of Engineering and a Distinguished Professor at the University of Arkansas, where he also held named chairs including the Irma and Raymond Giffels’ Chair in Engineering. He served as dean until 2012. From 2012 to 2014 he was vice-chancellor of Galgotias University in India while on leave from Arkansas. He later headed the Department of Biomedical Engineering and served as provost and vice-chancellor for academic affairs at the University of Arkansas (2015-2016). He is currently Distinguished Professor (retired) and Dean Emeritus at the University of Arkansas and an adjunct Regents’ Professor at Georgia Tech.

He has also served as president and chief technology officer of WireTough Cylinders, LLC.

== Research ==
Saxena’s research centers on the mechanical behavior of materials, with particular attention to linear and nonlinear fracture mechanics, creep, fatigue, and creep-fatigue crack growth under high-temperature conditions. Aspects of his work on time-dependent crack growth parameters and test methods have been reflected in ASTM International standards.

He is the author or editor of several books, among them Nonlinear Fracture Mechanics for Engineers (CRC Press, 1998), Advanced Fracture Mechanics and Structural Integrity (CRC Press, 2019), and Basic Fracture Mechanics and its Applications (CRC Press, 2023).

== Awards and honors ==
Saxena has received the following recognitions:

- George R. Irwin Medal from ASTM International (1992), for contributions to the analysis of creep in engineering metals.
- ASTM Award of Merit and the accompanying title of Fellow (1994).
- Fellow of ASM International (1996).
- Wöhler Medal from the European Structural Integrity Society (2010), for contributions to fatigue research; noted as the third U.S. recipient.
- Fracture Mechanics Medal from ASTM International Committee E08 (announced 2010).
- Paul C. Paris Gold Medal from the International Congress on Fracture (2017).
- Fellow of the International Congress on Fracture (2009).

He has also served in professional roles including as chair of the University Materials Council and as a program evaluator, commissioner, and a board member for ABET.

== Selected publications ==
- Saxena, A.; Hudak Jr., S. J. (1978). "Review and extension of compliance information for common crack growth specimens". International Journal of Fracture. 14 (5): 453–468. doi:10.1007/BF01390468.
- Saxena, A.; Antolovich, S. D. (1975). "Low cycle fatigue, fatigue crack propagation and substructures in a series of polycrystalline Cu-Al alloys". Metallurgical Transactions A. 6 (9): 1809–1828. doi:10.1007/BF02642310.
- Saxena, Ashok (1998). Nonlinear Fracture Mechanics for Engineers. CRC Press. ISBN 978-0-8493-9496-6.
- Saxena, Ashok (2023). Basic Fracture Mechanics and its Applications. CRC Press. ISBN 978-1-032-26719-7.
- Millett, P. C.; Selvam, R. P.; Saxena, A. (2007). "Stabilizing nanocrystalline materials with dopants". Acta Materialia. 55 (7): 2329–2336. doi:10.1016/j.actamat.2006.11.029.
- Saxena, A. (1986). "Creep Crack Growth Under Nonsteady-state Conditions". Fracture Mechanics: Seventeenth Volume. ASTM STP 905. ASTM International: 185–201.
