= Jamai Raja (film) =

- Film poster
- Directed by: A. Kodandarami Reddy
- Written by: Kamlesh Pandey (dialogues)
- Screenplay by: A. Kodandarami Reddy
- Story by: Satyanand
- Based on: Athaku Yamudu Ammayiki Mogudu by A. Kodandarami Reddy
- Produced by: T. Trivikrama Rao
- Starring: Hema Malini; Anil Kapoor; Madhuri Dixit; Anupam Kher
- Cinematography: V. S. R. Swamy
- Edited by: Kotagiri Venkateswara Rao
- Music by: Laxmikant Pyarelal
- Production company: Vijayalakshmi Art Pictures
- Release date: 19 October 1990
- Country: India
- Language: Hindi

Jamai Raja (transl. Son-in-law) is a 1990 Indian Hindi-language masala film. The film stars Hema Malini, Anil Kapoor and Madhuri Dixit. It is directed by A. Kodandarami Reddy and is a remake of the 1989 Telugu film Attaku Yamudu Ammayiki Mogudu. The film was a commercial success.

== Plot ==
Durgeshwari is a rich and proud lady. She stays in her palatial house with her two sons, Dheeraj and Neeraj, her daughter Rekha, her brother Dindayal Trivedi, his friend Banke Bihari Chaturvedi, and her personal secretary Shakti. Rekha studies in a medical college in Bombay. Durgeshwari has full control over her home and company and is feared by all. Her ambitions of getting Rekha married intoi an equally rich family fail when Rekha falls in love with Raja, an educated but unemployed young man. Durgeshwari asks Raja to live with them after the marriage. Hoping to make him back out of the marriage, she tries many tricks to humiliate, demean, and even portrays a false image in front of Rekha with the help of her aides. It all goes in vain as Raja outdoes her and eventually enters into her good books.

== Cast ==
- Hema Malini as Durgeshwari
- Anil Kapoor as Raja
- Madhuri Dixit as Rekha
- Anupam Kher as Dindayal Trivedi
- Satish Kaushik as Banke Bihari Chaturvedi
- Shakti Kapoor as Shakti
- Aloknath as Vishwanath
- Annu Kapoor as Paltu / I.C. Mishra
- Shashi Puri as Dheeraj
- Anand Balraj as Neeraj
- Seema Deo as Raja's Mother
- Disco Shanti as Aruna
- Jagdeep as Aruna's Father
- Vikas Anand as Police Inspector
- Divyavani as Indu

== Soundtrack ==
The songs of the film were composed by Laxmikant Pyarelal and lyrics were by Javed Akhtar.

| Song | Singer |
|---|---|
| "Teri Pyari Pyari Baaten Mujhe Achhi Lagti Hai" | S. P. Balasubrahmanyam, S. Janaki |
| "Tere Pyar Mein Hum Doob Gaye Itne Sanam" | S. P. Balasubrahmanyam, S. Janaki |
| "Pyar Hua Hai Mujhe Aur Tujhe" | Kavita Krishnamurthy, Amit Kumar |
| "Hum Aur Tum" | Amit Kumar, Alka Yagnik |
| "Aag Lag Rahi Hai" | Amit Kumar, Alka Yagnik |
