= Shruti Sharma =

Indian model, beauty pageant and actress

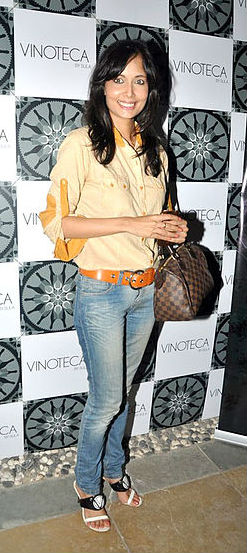
- Sharma in 2012
- Born: Sadia Afridi; India
- Occupations: Actor, Model

Shruti Sharma (Born as Sadia Afridi) is an Indian actress, model and beauty pageant titleholder. She won the title of Femina Miss India World and represented India at Miss World 2002 pageant held at London, England and made it to the semi-finals.

Sharma's adopted parents are Sushil and Mrinal Sharma. She did her schooling at Convent of Jesus and Mary, Waverley, Mussoorie and attended the Jesus and Mary College (JMC), Delhi. She has also acted in the Bollywood movie Tezaab - The Acid of Love.

Awards and achievements
Preceded by Sara Corner	Femina Miss India World; 2002	Succeeded by Ami Vashi
