= Udayasankar =

Indian film director

- Born: Tamil Nadu, India
- Occupations: Film director, Producer
- Years active: 1989–present
- Children: 2

Udayasankar is an Indian film director known for his works in Telugu and Tamil cinema. he directed Kalisundam Raa, which won a National Film Award for Best Feature Film in Telugu.. He directed in the Tamil Thavasi starring Vijayakanth. In 2001

== Career ==
Udayasankar made his directorial was Poochudava starring Abbas and Simran. His next directorial was in Telugu titled Kalisundam Raa starring Venkatesh and Simran, the film was a blockbuster.

The lead pair and director again collaborated with Prematho Raa but failed to repeat the success of their previous venture. Udayasankar directed Vijayakanth in the hit Tamil film Thavasi, the film received mixed reviews and did well at box office. He directed Raraju with Gopichand and Baladur with Ravi Teja in Telugu both films failed at box office. After a long gap, he directed Bhimavaram Bullodu in Telugu.

== Filmography ==
Year	Film	Language	Notes
1994	Pathavi Piramanam	Tamil	Debut movie
1997	Poochudava	Tamil	
2000	Kalisundam Raa	Telugu	
2001	Prematho Raa	Telugu	
2001	Thavasi	Tamil	
2003	Ondagona Baa	Kannada	Remake of Kalisundam Raa
2006	Raraju	Telugu	
2008	Baladoor	Telugu	
2014	Bhimavaram Bullodu	Telugu	

== Awards ==
- Nandi Award for Best Story Writer - Kalisundam Raa (2000)
