= Vikas Kalantri =

Indian comedian, actor and businessman (b.1980)

Vikaas Kalantri
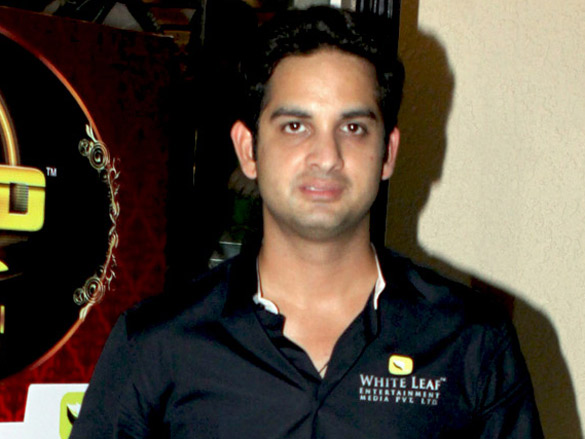
- Vikaas Kalantri in 2011
- Born: 17 August 1978 (age 47); Mumbai, Maharashtra, India
- Occupation: Actor
- Years active: 2001–2011
- Notable work: Nayee Padosan, Naqaab
- Spouse: Priyanka Chibber
- Parents: Vijay Kalantri (father); Mohini Kalantri (mother)

Vikas Kalantri is a Hindi actor who has done films such as Dil Bechara Pyaar Ka Mara, where he appeared alongside actor Mallika Kapoor and others. He has also done films such as Nayee Padosan and Jigyaasa.

== Personal life ==
Vikas Kalantri was born on 17 August 1980 in Mumbai. He married TV actress Priyanka Chibber.

== Filmography ==
Year	Film	Role	Notes
2001	Pyaar Zindagi Hai	Amit	First Film
2003	Nayee Padosan	Ram	
2004	Dukaan: Pila House	Madhav	
2004	Dil Bechara Pyaar Ka Maara		
2006	Jigyaasa	Avinash Chopra	
2006	Katputtli		
2007	Gandhi Park	Steve Philips	
2007	Naqaab	Siddharth Mishra (as Vikaas Kalantri)	
2007	Aggar	Mihir	
2008	Jimmy		
2009	Meri Life Mein Uski Wife	Basu Ghosh	
2011	Sheetalbhabi.com	Basu	
