= Meenal =

Indian actress

- Born: Meenal
- Occupation: Actress
- Years active: 2000–present
- Relatives: Senthi Kumari (sister)

Meenal is an Indian actress who mainly appears in Tamil films. She has appeared in Cheran's Thavamai Thavamirundhu, Vetrimaran's Aadukalam, Thangar Bachan's Ammavin Kaipesi and Bharathiraja's Annakodi.

== Filmography ==
Year	Film	Role	Notes
2000	En Sakhiye	Rama	
2001	Lovely	Nurse Madhumitha	Uncredited role
2005	Thavamai Thavamirundhu	Ramanathan's wife	
2005	Aadum Koothu	Deivanayaki	
2005	Thirupaachi	Raj Guru's Daughter	
2006	Sillunu Oru Kaadhal	Kundhavi's friend	
2006	Manasu Palike Mouna Raagam		Telugu film; special appearance in the song "Steppu Veyara"
2007	Deepavali	Revathy	
2007	Soorya Kireedam	Ashwathy	Malayalam film
2007	Pallikoodam	Kumarasamy's wife	
2007	Viyabari	Item dancer	
2008	Valvellam Vasantham	Nithya	
2009	Anthony Yaar?	Kingfisher's love interest	
2010	Veeran Maran		
2010	Magane En Marumagane		
2011	Aadukalam	Meena (Pettaikaran's wife)	
2011	Velayudham	Abducted girl	
2011	Aayiram Vilakku		
2011	Aduthathu		
2012	Murattu Kaalai	Saroja's maid	
2012	Suzhal	Prabhu's sister	
2012	Ammavin Kaipesi	Kanaga	
2013	Annakodi	Narthanga Magudeeshwari	
2014	Jilla	A Complainant	
2014	Goli Soda	Naidu's sister- in-law (second wife)	
2014	Mosakutty		
2021	Pulikkuthi Pandi	Chittu	TV film
2023	Karumegangal Kalaigindrana		
2024	Goli Soda Rising	Naidu's sister- in-law (second wife)	Web Series
2026	Exam	Vimala	Web Series
