= Chinthavishtayaya Shyamala =

1998 Indian film

- Poster
- Directed by: Sreenivasan
- Written by: Sreenivasan
- Produced by: C. Karunakaran
- Starring: Sangita; Sreenivasan
- Cinematography: S. Kumar
- Edited by: A. Sreekar Prasad
- Music by: Johnson
- Production company: Carlton Films
- Distributed by: Filimothsav
- Release date: 15 October 1998
- Running time: 158 minutes
- Country: India
- Language: Malayalam

Chinthavishtayaya Shyamala (transl. Pensive Shyamala) is a 1998 Indian Malayalam-language comedy-drama film written and directed by Sreenivasan. Its stars Sangita and himself, with Thilakan, Innocent, Nedumudi Venu, Sudheesh, Siddique, and Mamukkoya in supporting roles. The plot follows a lazy negligent father and husband who embraces faith as a means of escape, further abandoning his responsibilities to his family.

Chinthavishtayaya Shyamala is often considered as one of the classic family dramas in Malayalam. It won the National Film Award for Best Film on Other Social Issues, the Kerala State Film Award for Best Actress (for Sangita), and two Filmfare Awards South. The film was remade in Telugu as Aavide Syamala (1999) and Tamil as Chidambarathil Oru Appasamy (2005).

== Plot ==
Vijayan is a village school teacher who believes that his degree in economics will make him succeed in business ventures. Frequently taking long leaves from his job, he pursues these ventures, all of which fail. He lives with his wife, Shyamala, and their two daughters.

During one such venture, Vijayan attempts to produce a short advertising film at the encouragement of a friend. The attempt fails due to his lack of experience, and he abandons the project. His father, Karunan Mash, grows concerned about Vijayan’s neglect of his teaching job and its impact on the family. Shyamala, who is less educated, supports Vijayan’s actions, believing their difficulties to be temporary. Karunan mash and Vijayan's father-in-law, Achuthan Nair, suggest that Vijayan undertake the annual pilgrimage to the Sabarimala temple in the hope that it will lead to a change in his outlook. Vijayan eventually agrees and observes the customary 41-day period of fasting and abstinence.

After returning from Sabarimala, Vijayan adopts a highly religious lifestyle, including vegetarianism, prayer, and renunciation stating that many people have turned to spiritualism after making all the riches in life.He defends his actions saying if spirituality is the ultimate goal anyways then why go through the trouble of slogging and making money. The bills rack up and the lack of money takes a toll on Shyamala who is unable to pay for groceries and kids fees. He later leaves his family to live in an ashram. His presence there creates difficulties, and the ashram residents eventually learn that he has a family and his faith is merely a mean for escapism. He is advised by the head of the ashram to take responsibility for his life rather than withdraw from it. Vijayan then leaves the ashram and returns home.

During Vijayan’s absence, Shyamala begins working as a tailor with a tailoring unit operating out of their house . She becomes the primary provider for the family making progress in all aspects slowly and steadily. She supports the household independently and encourages her sister to complete her education and seek employment. When Vijayan attempts to rejoin the family, Shyamala is cold and indifferent towards him. Vijayan faces same hostile attitude from his in laws and even Karunan mash who goes to the extent of threatening to burn him alive if he ever steps into his house again. He also berates Vijayan's lack of responsibilities and taunts him saying its his irresponsibility that made Shyamala stand on her feet and be independent and thus her indifference towards him. Vijayan now having realised his mistakes starts correcting them one by one. He rejoins his school job and rekindles his friendship with his old friends whom he had abandoned. All of no avail, as despite his efforts at reconciliation, Shyamala initially asks him to leave them alone. When Vijayan conducts another drama to prevent leaving from home with the help of his kids Shyamala confronts him about his past actions and questions his commitment. She even asks if Vijayan has ever thought how she and his kids lived after he left them. Vijayan subsequently reflects on his actions and decides to resume his teaching career and new life as a responsible man.

The film concludes with Vijayan reuniting with his wife and children, as Communist party leaders, who are also undertaking the Sabarimala pilgrimage, walk along the same road and cross paths with the family.

== Cast ==
- Sangita as Shyamala
- Sreenivasan as Vijayan
- Thilakan as Karunan master
- Innocent as Achuthan Nair
- Nedumudi Venu as School headmaster
- Sudheesh as Suku
- Siddique as Johnnykutty
- Mamukkoya as Usman
- Augustine as Barber Chandhran
- Kamala Devi as Rathnavali
- Kripa as Divya
- Shafna as Kavya
- Unni Mannanur as Swamiji

== Production ==
For the role of Shyamala, Sreenivasan initially considered casting Seetha, but this did not materialize. Later, Mohanlal suggested Sangita for the role.

== Soundtrack ==
The film's soundtrack contains two songs, all composed by Johnson and lyrics by Gireesh Puthenchery and Yusufali Kechery.

#	Title	Singer(s)
1	"Aarodum Mindaathe"	K. J. Yesudas
2	"Machakathammaye"	M. G. Sreekumar, Chorus

== Release ==
=== Reception ===
The film received critical acclaim.

=== Box office ===
The film became a commercial success, becoming one of the highest-grossing Malayalam films of the year.

== Awards ==
The film won the National Film Award for Best Film on Other Social Issues in 1999. It won the Kerala State Film Award for Best Popular Film in 1998.

Award Category	Award	Artist
National Film Awards	Best Film on Other Social Issues	C. Karunakaran
Kerala State Film Awards	Best Film with Popular Appeal and Aesthetic Value; Best Actress	C. Karunakaran; Sangita
Filmfare Awards South	Best Film (Malayalam); Best Director (Malayalam)	C. Karunakaran; Sreenivasan
Asianet Film Awards	Best Film; Best Director	C. Karunakaran; Sreenivasan

== Remakes ==
It was remade in Telugu as Aavide Syamala (1999) by Kodi Ramakrishna. This film was later remade into Tamil as Chidambarathil Oru Appasamy in 2005 directed by Thangar Bachan who also starred in lead role.
