= Ammavin Kaipesi =

- Poster
- Directed by: Thankar Bachan
- Based on: Ammavin Kaipesi by Thangar Bachan
- Produced by: Thankar Bachan
- Starring: Shanthnu Bhagyaraj; Iniya
- Cinematography: Thangar Bachan
- Edited by: Kishore Te.
- Music by: Rohit Kulkarni
- Production company: Thankar Thiraikalam
- Distributed by: Maxpro Entertainers
- Release date: 13 November 2012
- Running time: 150 minutes
- Country: India
- Language: Tamil

Ammavin Kaipesi (transl. Mother's cell phone) is a 2012 Tamil-language drama film directed and cinematographed by Thankar Bachan. Based on a novel of the same name written by the director, the film stars Shanthnoo Bhagyaraj and Iniya, while the director himself plays a pivotal role. The music was composed by Rohit Kulkarni with editing by Kishore Te.

The film released on 13 November 2012, coinciding with Diwali, and received mixed-to-positive reviews.

== Plot ==
The story revolves around a mobile phone, which Thangar says connects people through voice and helps establish and maintain new relationships. There is a mother with nine children, but she lives in circumstances that keep her separated from them. The only way she can stay in touch and hear their voices is through her mobile phone. She sees her mobile phone as a surrogate for her children and has grown possessive of it.

== Cast ==
- Shanthnu Bhagyaraj as Annamalai
- Iniya as Selvi
- A. Revathy as Ranganayaki
- Thangar Bachan as Prasad
- Meenal as Kanaga
- Nagineedu as Chittibabu
- Azhagam Perumal as Chinnapillai
- Thambi Chozhan
- NSK. Senthil Kumar as Maatheswaran

== Production ==
Post Thangar Bachan's film Onbadhu Roobai Nottu, he was all set to release his next drama, Ammavin Kaipesi, said to be about an abandoned mother. Thankar Bachan has also said that people who have abandoned their parents would feel terribly bad after watching the film. The film went on the floor on 15 July 2012.

== Soundtrack ==
Ammavin Kaipesi

Soundtrack album to Ammavin Kaipesi by Rohit Kulkarni
- Released: 1 October 2012
- Recorded: 2012
- Genre: Feature film soundtrack
- Language: Tamil
- Label: Saregama
- Producer: Rohit Kulkarni

Rohit Kulkarni chronology
Porkkalam (2010)	Ammavin Kaipesi (2012)

Film score and soundtrack of Ammavin Kaipesi are composed by Rohit Kulkarni who earlier composed music for Porkkalam. Audio was released in Satyam Cinemas, Chennai on 1 October 2012 and was released by many famous actors of Tamil Cinema. The song 'Enna Senji Pora' was shown in the trailer and got a good response.

Track listing
No.	Title	Lyrics	Singer(s)	Length
1.	"Enna Senji Pora"	Na. Muthukumar	Rajiv Sundaresan	4:34
2.	"Amma Thaane"	Ekadesi	Haricharan	4:28
3.	"Nenjil Eno Indru (Female)"	Ekadesi	Harini	5:30
4.	"Nenjil Eno Indru (Male)"	Ekadesi	Haricharan	5:32
5.	"Rajapattai"	Na. Muthukumar	Pushpavanam Kuppusamy, RaginiShri	4:54
6.	"Thalai Mudhal Padham Varai"		Instrument	4:12
7.	"Ammavin Kaipesi Theme 1"		Instrument	2:27
8.	"Ammavin Kaipesi Theme 2"		Instrument	2:34
Total length:				32:53

== Release and reception ==
Ammavin Kaipesi was released on 13 November 2012 alongside Podaa Podi and Thuppakki.

Pavithra Srinivasan of Rediff gave the film a 2.5/5 rating and said, "Ammavin Kaipesi is supposed to be about the distances between members of the same family, and how a cell-phone often takes the place of near and dear ones but even though its heart is in the right place, too much melodrama and an endlessly meandering screenplay brings it down." IANS gave the film a 3/5 rating and said, "Yes, the film is relatively slow and patience-testing, but it is definitely worth the time and money spent. The director keeps everything as real as possible, but doesn't attempt to tamper with the setting of the film or its characters".
