= Onbathu Roobai Nottu =

- Film poster
- Directed by: Thankar Bachan
- Based on: Onbathu Roobai Nottu by Thankar Bachan
- Produced by: A. S. Ganesan
- Starring: Sathyaraj; Archana; Nassar; Rohini
- Cinematography: Thankar Bachan
- Music by: Bharadwaj
- Production company: Indian Cinema Factory
- Release date: 30 November 2007
- Country: India
- Language: Tamil

Onbathu Roobai Nottu (transl. Nine-rupee banknote) is a 2007 Indian Tamil-language drama film directed by Thankar Bachan, based on Bachan's own same-titled novel. It depicts the tragic life and fall of Madhava Padayachi, a simple villager, played by Sathyaraj, and his family. Also starring Archana, Nassar and Rohini in supporting roles, the film was released on 30 November 2007 to high critical acclaim and was praised as one of the best movies in Tamil cinema.

== Plot ==
A seventy-year-old man, Madhava Padayachi, meets his old friend's 23-year-old son Murugan in Chennai, who was leaving for their native village for his father's death day rites. Padaychi has been away from his village for twelve years and narrates his exile life to Murugan. Murugan feels for Madhava, who was a rich farmer long time back in his village and takes him along by bus.

Madhava is fondly called Madhavar and has lived since birth in his village where he is respected. He and his loving wife Velayi, their three sons, and two daughters live a happy life in their village. He is an honest and hardworking farmer who will do anything for others. Despite being earning well, Madhavan does not engage in unnecessary expenditures which continuously irks his family except Velayi. When Velayi beats her sons for not getting educated, Madhavan shields them and spoils them. Years later, his daughters get happily married and settle down in neighboring towns. Madhavan's two sons get married and have children. Madhavan's eldest son's in-laws also come to stay in Madhavan's home.

In the meantime, Dhandapani, a rich relative and neighbor of Madhavan discovers that his daughter has become pregnant by an illiterate nephew of his. Dhandapani plans to abort the child, kill his nephew, and get his daughter married elsewhere. The village heads, under Madhavan, intervene and ensure that Dhandapani gets his girl married to her lover. This causes Dhandapani to grow deep hatred against Madhavan and he poisons Madhavar's children's mind slowly. In the meantime, Madhavan's last son falls in love with a girl from a lower caste, and the entire village, including Velayi, is against the marriage. That year, Madhavan reaps a huge profit from harvest and gives it to his wife for safekeeping. Upon Dhandapani's influence, Madhavan's two sons and their wives rebel against them and create a huge verbal fight in the house.

This deeply hurts Madhavar and he leaves his home with his wife. Madhavar goes to Chennai to meet his good old friend Hajabhai and his wife Kameela and accommodates himself in their house. Hajabhai was direly helped by Madhavar in his bad times in the past, and Hajabhai gives Madhavan six acres land of his own, to rear cattle and settle. Madhavan and Velayi live there for six years. One day Madhavan sees his youngest son in a nearby town. His son works as a coolie for Dhandapani (who is shown to have accepted his son-in-law as heir) and is deeply poor. This melts his heart, and he tells velayi about it. The couple plan to return home, but Velayi dies that night, bitten by a snake. Madhavan sells of all goats and visits Hajabai to give the money. At the same time, Hajabai is to leave for Bangalor for a surgery. Hajabhai informs Kamila's brothers that he has registered that six acres of land on Madhavan's name, enraging the brothers who have been managing Hajabai's industries and properties. An unforeseen scuffle incident makes Madhavar leave Hajabhai's home for good, and he sets off on a long journey that recalls the last years of his life.

Madhavan and Murugan reach their village past midnight, and Murugan accommodates him at his house. Murugan's mother is shocked to see Madhavan alive and tells what happened in his absence. Dhandapani had instigated fights between the three brothers and caused them to partition their properties. Since the two elder brothers wanted to live in leisure, they sold their properties to Dhandapani for meager rates, over the years. Even Madhavan's ancestral house was sold to Dhandapani. Madhavan's second was falsely blamed for a murder and due to repeated legal issues, he killed himself, and his wife went back to her father's place with her kids. Madhavan's eldest son lives like a drunken coolie, while Dhandapani is the richest in surrounding villages. Only, Madhavan's last son, ostracized by the village, lives in Madhavan's jack fruit farm with his family. Madhavan's eldest grandson lives modestly as a cycle-repair shop owner and party local chief. Madhavan's two daughters are safe and happy in their lives.

Hearing that his entire lineage has crumbled to nothing after many years of his hard work, Madhavan dies the next morning. Madhavan's body is brought back to Murugan's house and his final rites are performed. Madhavan's grandchildren beat Dhandapani black and blue for his actions. Murugan decides to quit his job in Chennai and start farming again.

== Cast ==
- Sathyaraj as Madhava Padayachi
- Archana as Velayi
- Nassar as Hajabhai
- Rohini as Kameela
- Sivashankar as Dhandapani
- Pathman
- Suryakanth
- Nitish Veera as Madhava Padayachi's youngest son
- Appukutty
- Nitesh Kumar
- Inbanila
- George Maryan as Villager
- Telephone Raj
- Senthi Kumari as Villager

== Production ==
The film was launched in February 2004 and progressed slowly through production. Some of the scenes were shot in Ambur.

== Soundtrack ==
The soundtrack was composed by Bharadwaj.

Onbadhu Roobai Nottu

Soundtrack album by Bharadwaj
- Released: 2007
- Genre: Feature film soundtrack
- Producer: Bharadwaj

Bharadwaj chronology
Pallikoodam (2007)	Onbadhu Roobai Nottu (2007)	Vallamai Tharayo (2008)

No.	Song	Singers	Lyrics
1	"Maargazhiyil"	Srinivas	Vairamuthu
2	"Velayi Adiye"	K. A. Gunasekaran	Vairamuthu
3	"Yaar Yaaro"	Bharadwaj	Vairamuthu
4	"Vellaviyil"	Bharadwaj, Gunavathi	Vairamuthu
5	"Engalukkum I"	S. P. Balasubrahmanyam, Janani Bharadwaj	Vairamuthu
6	"Engalukkum II"	S. P. Balasubrahmanyam	Vairamuthu

== Critical reception ==
Behindwoods wrote: "Thankar Bachan has all elements of his creative genius and is sure to make an impact as a masterpiece among true movie lovers. Onbadhu Roobai Nottu is sure to find favors among true movie buffs and would entice great circulation especially among people who love films as passionately as any art form. The film may find good patrons among women and is sure to represent Indian cinema in many of the international film festivals."

Malathi Rangarajan of The Hindu wrote "Thankar Bachan's films follow certain laudable norms.‘Onbadhu Roobai …’ is another such. Satyaraj's admirable underplay ought to catapult him to the National Award bracket straightway. You cannot forget this Madhavar for a long time to come."

Indiaglitz wrote: "Thankar Bachachn is one of the rare filmmakers in Tamil industry, who believe in story rather than stars or fanfare. He has chosen a strong story and selected the cast accordingly. His handling of the stars and execution of the scenes are praiseworthy."

Rediff wrote: "If movie critics' words are taken seriously by the mandarins in the Union Information and Broadcasting Ministry and those in their panel to choose the best actor, anyone having watched Onbathu would undoubtedly vote for Sathyaraj as the best actor at the national level."

Kathir Bharathi of Kalki praised the acting of star cast, music, cinematography, screenplay, dialogues and concluded saying Thangar Bachan for portraying the ups and downs of a Tamilian in heartfelt manner and directors like him taking Tamil cinema to next level is a good event. In that sense, Onbathu Roobai Nottu is an gutsy breakthrough.

Chennai Online wrote "The script does lag at places, losing a bit of focus, and some trimming could have helped here. Also, there is a clutter of characters in the earlier scenes and it takes time to identify them. Again, with Bachan's recent releases we somehow don't get that feel of complete satisfaction that we had experienced while watching his debut film 'Azhagi' or even his 'Thendral'. But what is commendable is Bachan's persistence in not bowing to commercial considerations, treading his lonely path, and attempting to make films that are different and more rooted to the soil."

== Awards ==
Best Actor Award for Sathyaraj at Vijay Awards given by STAR Vijay group.
