= Divya Palat =

Indian theatre producer and director

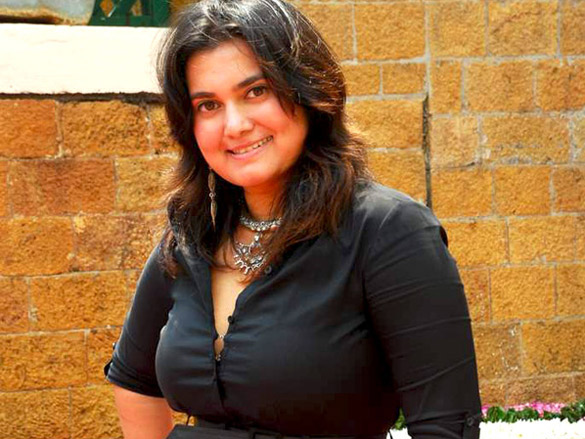
Divya Palat at IPL screening event

Divya Palat (born in Calcutta, India) is a Producer and Director for theatre plays like A Personal War- Stories of the Mumbai Terror Attacks and was a Hindi actress who has done films, such as Masti with Vivek Oberoi, Dhund with Apurva Agnihotri, Kuch Naa Kaho with Aishwarya and Abhishek Bachchan, Krishna Cottage with Sohail Khan and Dil Bechara Pyaar Ka Mara with actress Mallika Kapoor. She also acted in an Indian television series named Captain Vyom (aired in late 90s).

== Early life and career ==
As her father was periodically transferred, Divya studied in schools in Mumbai, New York and in Delhi. In India, she began her acting career in a TV series, Captain Vyom. Prior to this, she had acted in several plays, including The Sound of Music and Legend of Ram.

In the early 2000s, she set up a Production Company, "Balancing Act Productions", that has produced several plays, including A Personal War- Stories of the Mumbai Terror Attacks, The Verdict, The Graduate, Love Bytes, Starring U & Me! and The Wizard of Oz.

She wrote a play based on the survivors of the 26/11 Mumbai Terror Attacks, entitled A Personal War- Stories of the Mumbai Terror Attacks.

== Filmography ==
Year	Film	Role	Notes
1998	Captain Vyom	Dr. Zen	
2000	Chal Mere Bhai		Guest appearance in song 'Mehndi Rang Laayi'
2000	Utthara Dhruvadim Dakshina Dhruvaku		Kannada movie
2003	Dhund	Kajal	
2003	Kuch Naa Kaho	Rachna Singh Gangwar	
2004	Masti	Sheetal	
2004	Krishna Cottage	Nupur	
2004	Dil Bechara Pyaar Ka Maara	Sherry	
