= S. P. Hosimin =

Indian film director

S.P. Hosimin
- Occupations: Film director, producer
- Spouse: Hema (m. 2011)

S.P. Hosimin is an Indian film director who works in Tamil-language films.

== Film career ==
He worked under director S. Shankar as an assistant director. He was initially supposed to debut with a bilingual romantic comedy titled Apple in Tamil and Premante Suluvu Kaadhura in Telugu, starring Uday Kiran as the lead, however, after 80 percent of the shoot, the film was dropped and ultimately shelved. In 2005, Hosimin made his directorial debut with the romantic drama film February 14 starring Bharath. His second project, Aayiram Vilakku, was released in 2011 and revolves around the bonding of a young guy and an old man portrayed by Shanthanu Bhagyaraj and Sathyaraj respectively.

Currently, he is working on his upcoming release, Sumo, an action comedy film produced by Ishari K. Ganesh, set to be released in 2023, and featuring Rajiv Menon as the cinematographer. The film features a cast including Yoshinori Tashiro and Shiva.

He is also producing a movie titled Rainbow, starring Niroop of Big Boss fame, under his own production company Hosimin Productions in collaboration with Sri Annamar Productions.

== Personal life ==
Hosimin married Hema in 2011.

== Filmography ==
As director

- February 14 (2005)
- Aayiram Vilakku (2011)
- Sumo (2025)

As lyricist

- Aedhu Nijam Enn Kannmani (2022)
