= Aayiram Vilakku =

- Directed by: S. P. Hosimin
- Starring: Sathyaraj; Shanthanu Bhagyaraj; Sana Khan
- Cinematography: D. Kannan
- Edited by: G. Sasikumar
- Music by: Srikanth Deva
- Production company: HMI Movies
- Release date: 23 September 2011
- Running time: 124 minutes
- Country: India
- Language: Tamil

Aayiram Vilakku (transl. Thousand Lights) is a 2011 Indian Tamil-language action drama film directed by S. P. Hosimin. The film stars Sathyaraj and Shanthanu Bhagyaraj, whilst Sana Khan, Suman, Kamal Kamaraju, and Ganja Karuppu, play pivotal roles. The film, produced by HMI Pictures and scored by Srikanth Deva, was released on 23 September 2011. The movie received mixed reviews.

== Plot ==
The film opens when a child named Tarun starts asking his father Gopal to tell him an interesting story. Gopal starts telling about the story of Lingam, his former adopted father.

Lingam is the don of Madurai, and the people get scared when his name is heard. The police commissioner orders that if Lingam takes part in any crimes, he will be killed. Thus, Lingam takes a decision to build a mill in Aayiram Vilakku Nagar.

Gopal is a man who works in a rice mill. Megha and Gopal love each other and constantly romance. The people in Aayiram Vilakku Nagar accept the deal and move from that place except for Gopal. One day, Lingam's men came to ask for his land, but he rejects the deal. Lingam notices this and decides to adopt Gopal. Gopal's life changes, and he is soon a protector of his adopted father. He is soon a problem for an opposing gang and the police force. They begin to cause trouble for him and Lingam.

The opposing gang challenges Gopal and Lingam to fight. Gopal refuses, and one night at a wedding, he and Megha are chased by the opposing gang and run throughout the village, trying to escape. Gopal kills the henchmen and saves Megha, who was about to get tortured. Gopal and Lingam are then forced to accept the fight with no other choice. Lingam and Gopal get their guns prepared overnight and head to the fields the next morning. Lingam and Gopal both fight with the rowdies and kill all of them.

The police force enters the situation, and soon, Gopal and Megha leave the fields running but are followed by Dilli. The police tells Lingam that if he shoots Dilli, he will be killed for all his past crimes. If he does not, he will be cleared of all charges and will return to a normal life. Lingam tells Gopal that Dilli is behind him, but Gopal does not hear him. Dilli is just about to stab Gopal, until Lingam shoots Dilli. Gopal hears the shot and sees Dilli dead. The officers subsequently shoot Lingam. Megha and Gopal run back to Lingam, who says that he was proud of Gopal and wishes for Gopal to take his place as the leader of the dons. Gopal tearfully accepts, and Lingam dies in Gopal's hands.

Gopal is seen later telling Tarun that because of Lingam, they are still living.

== Cast ==
- Sathyaraj in dual roles as Lingam and Kannaayiram
- Shanthanu Bhagyaraj as Gopal
- Sana Khan as Megha
- Suman
- Kamal Kamaraju as Dilli
- Ganja Karuppu as Tyson
- Thambi Ramaiah
- Delhi Ganesh
- Mahadevan as Commissioner Rajendran
- Thalaivasal Vijay as Selvam
- Bharathi Kannan
- Suja
- Theepetti Ganesan as Arapudi
- Meenal

== Production ==
S. P. Hosimin, who earlier worked as a co-director to Shankar and who previously directed the Bharath-starrer February 14, started his next project in 2010. Shanthanu is the lead hero and he would be playing a young man from Madurai. Sathyaraj was selected to play an important role. Sana Khan was selected to play a village belle. The film was started shooting in October 2010.

== Soundtrack ==
The music composed by Srikanth Deva.

No.	Song	Singers	Lyrics
1	"Aandipatti"	Karthik	Vairamuthu
2	"Enna Thavam"	K. J. Yesudas	Vairamuthu
3	"Madhura Madhura"	Naveen, Velmurugan	Vairamuthu
4	"Paappakku Oru Jigarthanda"	Karthik, Rita	Vairamuthu
5	"Porale"	Karthik	Vairamuthu
6	"Rathiye En Rathiye"	Harish Raghavendra, Chinmayi	Vairamuthu
7	"Uthama Puthirane"	K. J. Yesudas	Vairamuthu

== Reception ==
Indiaglitz wrote, "Director Hosimin has tried to mix action with emotion, and is successful to a certain extent."
