= Chidambarathil Oru Appasamy =

- DVD cover
- Directed by: Thankar Bachan
- Screenplay by: Thangar Bachan
- Story by: Sreenivasan
- Produced by: Thankar Bachan
- Starring: Thankar Bachan; Navya Nair
- Cinematography: B. Kannan
- Edited by: S. Sathish; J. N. Harsha
- Music by: Ilaiyaraaja
- Production company: Thangar Thiraikalam
- Release date: 24 August 2005
- Country: India
- Language: Tamil

Chidambarathil Oru Appasamy (transl. An Appasamy from Chidambaram) is a 2005 Indian Tamil-language satirical film directed by Thankar Bachan, who also wrote the screenplay and stars with Navya Nair. It is a remake of the Malayalam film Chinthavishtayaya Shyamala (1998).

== Plot ==
Elangovan is a school teacher in Chidambaram who is a jack of all trades but master of none. He spends time with friends boozing, gambling, and trying out new businesses that always fail. His wife is Thenmozhi, and they have two daughters. Elangovan's father and father-in-law try to make him responsible towards his family, but he refuses to take up anything serious in life. On everyone's advice, Elangovan goes to Sabarimala after taking Vrath but returns to continue as Sanyasi without being the least bothered about his duties towards his family. Fearing his wife and relatives, he decides to join a mutt, but there also he is unable to sustain. In the meantime, Thenmozhi works hard to educate her children. She is mentally prepared to live without her husband when he returns and pleads with her as usual. This time, she is not willing to pardon him and ignores him. What happens then forms the climax and message of the film.

== Cast ==
- Thankar Bachan as Elangovan
- Navya Nair as Thenmozhi
- Pyramid Natarajan as Elangovan's father
- R. Sundarrajan as Elangovan's father-in-law
- Ganja Karuppu
- Jagan
- Ponnambalam
- George Maryan
- Pandu
- Venba as Kani, Elangovan's daughter
- Prabhu Solomon as Elangovan's friend
- Saranya Nag as Thenmozhi's sister

== Production ==
Chidambarathil Oru Appasamy is a remake of the Malayalam film Chinthavishtayaya Shyamala (1998). Director Thangar Bachan made his acting debut as lead actor with this film. He stated he had to do the role as no actor was willing to portray the father of two children.

== Soundtrack ==
The soundtrack was composed by Ilaiyaraaja. The audio launch was held in Chennai on 12 August 2005. The audio was released by director Bharathiraja and was received by Balu Mahendra.

Song	Singers	Lyrics
"Nalla Vaazhvu"	Manjari, Karthik, Chorus	Vaali
"Ayya Enna"	Manjari, Tippu	Gangai Amaran
"Pudhusa Nenachikittu"	Tippu, Ranjith	Muthulingam
"Ponna Porandha"	Manjari	Mu. Metha
"Anaithu Vidungal"	Febi Mani, Ranjith, Naveen	Palani Bharathi

== Release and reception ==
The film's television rights were sold to Jaya TV, and it premiered there on Diwali while still playing in theatres. S. R. Ashok Kumar of The Hindu wrote, "Thankar Bachan passes muster in the lead role. But it is Navya Nair as the beleaguered wife who steals the show". Sify wrote, "The goodness of COA lies in the simple story, an outstanding performance by Navya Nair and soulful music of Ilaiyaraaja. The film with its cute message seeped in real life situations will keep you engrossed". Lajjavathi of Kalki praised the acting of Navya Nair and Ilaiyaraaja's music but criticised the director for adding item number and felt most of the scenes feel predictable.
