= Janani Bharadwaj =

Indian playback singer

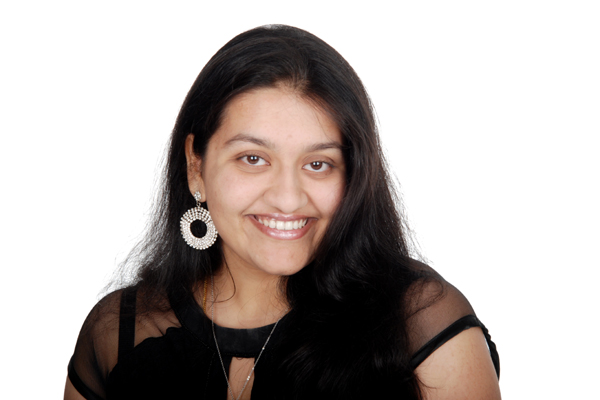

Background information
- Born: 30 June 1989 (age 36)
- Origin: Chennai, Tamil Nadu, India
- Occupation: Indian Playback Singer
- Years active: 2004 - present;

Janani Bharadwaj is an Indian playback singer. She has sung in Tamil and Telugu Languages. She is the daughter of the famous Tamil, Telugu music director Bharadwaj.

== Career ==
Janani debuted as a playback singer with the song Athiri Pathiri, from the film Ayya, composed by her father. She now leads an event management company in Canada called Master Mediaworks.

=== Discography ===
Janani has sung in more than 15 films in Tamil.

Song	Movie
"Athiri Pathiri"	Ayya
"Kangalinal"	Priyasakhi
"Nee Vendum"	Kundakka Mandakka
"Nanba Nanba"	February 14 (film)
"Araibia"	Idhaya Thirudan
"Ethanai Varusham"	Jambhavan
"Mudhal Mudhalai"	Vattaram
"Indha Nimidam"	Pallikoodam
"Kolattam"	Vallamai Tharayo
"Engalukkum"	Onbadhu Roobai Nottu
"Acham Vekkam"	Solla Solla Inikkum
"Tottadaing"	Aasal
"Azhagazhage"	Kalavadiya Pozhudugal
"Thannikulla Thee Pidichathennavo"	Nandhi
"Thee Thee Thalapathy"	Independent Album
