= Karumegangal Kalaigindrana =

2023 Tamil film

- Theatrical release poster
- Directed by: Thankar Bachan
- Written by: Thankar Bachan
- Produced by: Durai Veerasakthi
- Starring: Bharathiraja; Aditi Balan; Gautham Vasudev Menon; Yogi Babu
- Cinematography: N. K. Ekambaram
- Edited by: B. Lenin
- Music by: G. V. Prakash Kumar
- Production company: Riota Media
- Release date: 1 September 2023
- Country: India
- Language: Tamil

Karumegangal Kalaigindrana (transl. Dark clouds pass) is a 2023 Indian Tamil-language film written and directed by Thankar Bachan and starring Bharathiraja, Aditi Balan, Gautham Vasudev Menon and Yogi Babu in the lead roles. The music was composed by G. V. Prakash Kumar with cinematography by N. K. Ekambaram and editing by B. Lenin. The film was released on 1 September 2023.

== Plot ==
Komagan is a leading advocate in Madras High Court and the youngest son of retired justice Ramanathan, from whom he is estranged. Their rift began a decade back when Komagan defended a criminal his father had convicted, sparking a heated argument that ended with Ramanathan slapping Komagan. Years later, Ramanathan publicly apologizes at his birthday party. Later, he discovers a 13-year-old letter from Amudhavalli, Ramanathan's former lover, that revealing she has a daughter named Kanmani, who was imprisoned in Madurai. He sets out to find her without informing his family.

Upon reaching Manamadurai, Ramanathan realizes that he had sentenced his daughter Kanmani, who was then an inspector, to life imprisonment for being involved in a shootout that killed three criminals. He also learns that Kanmani lived with her mother and an adopted father named Murugan and proceeds towards Rameswaram in search of Kanmani and Amudhavalli. Meanwhile, Ramanathan's family begins searching for him, and Komagan is blamed for Ramanathan's disappearance.

Veeramani, a hotel owner in Kumbakonam, is separated from his daughter Saaral, who is being cared for in a juvenile home in Rameswaram, where Kanmani, now a social activist and warden, looks after her. Unbeknownst to Veeramani, Kanmani is Ramanathan's daughter. Veeramani helps Ramanathan after he loses his wallet. At a conch factory, Ramanathan recognizes Kanmani and also meets Meena, Veeramani's acquaintance and Saaral's mother. Veeramani reunites with Saaral at the orphanage, but their attempt to leave together sparks an issue. The police intervenes, but Ramanathan's timely arrival resolves the situation.

Veeramani shares his past with Ramanathan, explaining how he helped Meena when she was pregnant and fleeing her cheating ex-husband, Sethu. A few months later, Sethu returned, so Veeramani had to send Meena and Saaral to Sivagangai. However, Sethu's abuse prompted Meena and Sethu's sister to seek refuge in the orphanage. Ramanathan, moved by Veeramani's kindness, helps reunite him with Saaral and ensures Sethu's arrest.

Ramanathan confesses his paternity to Kanmani, but she refuses to forgive him for abandoning her mother. Kanmani reveals that her mother took responsibility for the family, pretending to act like her father Murugan to protect their family. Komagan searches for Ramanathan through the latter's friend Badri, discovers Amudhavalli's connection, and finally meets Kanmani at the orphanage. He asks for forgiveness on his father's behalf and acknowledges Kanmani's newfound family. However, Ramanathan, who is overwhelmed by guilt, leaves the orphanage and is seen gazing at the ocean. Meanwhile, unable to find his father, Komagan regrets taking the case that drove him and his father apart for more than a decade.

== Cast ==
- Bharathiraja as Justice Ramanathan
- Yogi Babu as Veeramani
- Gautham Vasudev Menon as Komagan, Ramanathan’s youngest son
- Aditi Balan as Kanmani, Ramanathan’s illegitimate daughter
- Baby Saaral as Saaral, Meena Kumari and Sethupathi's daughter
- Meenal as Indhu, Ramanathan's daughter
- Mahana Sanjeevi as Meena Kumari
- Rajesh Rajaram as Kalai, Ramanathan’s eldest son
- Vipin Lal as Sethupathi, Meena Kumari's Husband, Saral's Father
- Theertha Mohan as Subha, Komagan's wife
- Pyramid Natarajan as a corrupt businessman
- S. A. Chandrasekhar as Ramanathan's friend
- Veerasakthi
- Delhi Ganesh as Badri, Ramanathan's friend
- R. V. Udayakumar as Subha's brother
- Thalapathi
- Thangar Bachan as a public prosecutor (cameo appearance)

== Production ==
In May 2022, Thangar Bachan announced plans to make his 2003 short story Karumegangal Yaen Kalaiginrana? into a feature-length film. Bharathiraja, Yogi Babu and Gautham Vasudev Menon were signed on to play the lead roles, and production began in July 2022. The title of the film was later changed to Karumegangal Kalaigindrana. As a result of his work on the film, Thangar Bachan postponed post-production work on Takku Mukku Thikku Thalam starring his son Vijith.

Mamta Mohandas was signed on to play the female lead of Kanmani, but later opted out owing to a delay in the shoot caused by a sudden illness to Bharathiraja. Aditi Balan subsequently joined the film, citing her interest in working with Thangar Bachan. Several scenes from the film were shot on a schedule in Rameswaram. The shoot for the film was completed by January 2023.

== Soundtrack ==
Karumegangal Kalaigindrana

Soundtrack album by G. V. Prakash Kumar
- Released: 18 August 2023
- Genre: Film soundtrack
- Length: 23:02
- Language: Tamil
- Label: Sony Music South
- Producer: G. V. Prakash Kumar

G. V. Prakash Kumar chronology
| Aneethi (2023) | Karumegangal Kalaigindrana (2023) | Mark Antony (2023) |

The music for the film was composed by G. V. Prakash Kumar.

Track listing
| No. | Title | Lyrics | Singer(s) | Length |
|---|---|---|---|---|
| 1. | "Sevvandhi Poove" | Vairamuthu | Sathyaprakash | 5:41 |
| 2. | "Suththamulla Nenjam" | Vairamuthu | Saindhavi | 4:56 |
| 3. | "Mannikka Sonnen" | | Haricharan | 4:55 |
| 4. | "Megangal" | Vairamuthu | Saindhavi | 3:54 |
| 5. | "Niyayaththai Sonnen" | | Haricharan | 3:36 |
| Total length: | | | | 23:02 |

== Reception ==
The film was released on 1 September 2023 across theatres in Tamil Nadu. A reviewer from The Hindu noted "the ineffective screenwriting technique spoils this drama — starring Bharathiraja, Yogi Babu, Aditi Balan and Gautham Menon — but that doesn’t take away from the fact that filmmaker Thankar Bachan had an earnest and heart-wrenching story to tell." Logesh Balachandran of Times of India wrote "The film could have been an impactful emotional drama, but ends up only being an average watch", while Navein Darshan of Cinema Express noted it was "a testing, emotionally-distant drama". Conversely, a reviewer for Hindu Tamil Thisai gave a highly positive review, stating that the film "closely portrays the internal complexities and resulting losses within family relationships in contemporary Tamil society" and praised the director for "handling the story's conclusion like a modern literary text, without inadvertently infusing any commercial elements." Echoing this positive sentiment, Daily Thanthi commended the director for brilliantly capturing the emotions of the protagonists, describing the film as "a lifelike cinematic epic" that beautifully visualises crucial questions regarding human needs and the ultimate purpose of life.
