= Peranbum Perungobamum =

- Theatrical release poster
- Directed by: S. Sivaprakash
- Written by: S. Sivaprakash
- Produced by: Kamatchi Jayakrishnan; Thangar Bachan (presenter)
- Starring: Vijith Bachan; Shali Nivekas; Mime Gopi
- Cinematography: Dinesh K Bhojan
- Edited by: Ramar
- Music by: Ilaiyaraaja
- Production company: E5 Entertainment
- Release date: 5 June 2025
- Country: India
- Language: Tamil

Peranbum Perungobamum (transl. Compassion and anger) is a 2025 Indian Tamil-language thriller drama film written and directed by S. Sivaprakash. The film is produced by Kamatchi Jayakrishnan under the banner E5 Entertainment and presented by Thangar Bachan. The film stars Vijith Bachan and Shali Nivekas in the lead roles.

Peranbum Perungobamum was released in theatres on 5 June 2025.

== Plot ==
A man faces village caste leaders who hurt him and his love, experiencing three key life phases before confronting them to right past wrongs

== Cast ==
- Vijith Bachan as Jeeva
- Shali Nivekas as Sara
- Mime Gopi as Health Minister Muthupandi
- Aruldoss
- Deepa Shankar
- Geetha Kailasam
- Bava Chelladurai
- Subathra Robert as Jeeva's mother
- NPKS Logu
- Sai Vinoth
- Ramnath Shetty
- Manoj Kumar
- Logu
- Sai Vinoth
- Babu Chandran
- Arunmozhi
- Munish
- Jagan
- Rekha
- Haritha

== Production ==
Cinematographer turned actor-director, Thangar Bachan's son, Vijith Bachan was announced to make his debut as a lead actor in the film titled Peranbum Perungobamum, written and directed by S. Sivaprakash in his directorial debut. Also, Shali Nivekas was cast in to debut as the female lead. The film is produced by Kamatchi Jayakrishnan under the banner E5 Entertainment. The music for the film is composed by Ilaiyaraaja, while cinematography is handled by Dinesh K Bhojan and editing by Ramar. The film also features Mime Gopi, Aruldoss, Deepa Shankar, Subatra Robert, Sai Vinoth and others in supporting roles. Principal photography got completed and the film was in post-production stage during the first-look poster release in mid-February 2024.

== Music ==
External audio
- Peranbum Perungobamum Official JukeBox on YouTube

The film has music composed and written by Ilaiyaraaja.

All lyrics are written by Ilaiyaraaja; all music is composed by Ilaiyaraaja.

Track listing
No.	Title	Singer(s)	Length
1.	"Muthalamman"	Anthony Daasan
2.	"Oru Manaiviyai"	Karthik, Vibhavari Apte Joshi
3.	"Nanban illa Vazhkai"	Karthik, Vibhavari Apte Joshi

== Release ==
=== Theatrical ===
Peranbum Perungobamum was released in theatres on 5 June 2025.

== Reception ==
Hindu Tamil Thisai rated the film 2.5/5 stars, praising the actors to have performed their roles perfectly while criticizing the stumbling screenplay at some places. Abhinav Subramanian of The Times of India gave 2/5 stars and wrote "Peranbum Perungobamum desperately wants to say something profound about caste violence but gets lost in its own convoluted plotting. With fewer narrative detours, it could have delivered its message more powerfully." Nakkheeran reviewed the film by praising the storyline and the punishments given for caste atrocities, while criticizing its screenplay.
