= Kundakka Mandakka =

- DVD cover
- Directed by: Ashokan
- Written by: K. Balakumaran, C. Balamurugan (dialogues)
- Story by: Ashokan
- Produced by: Leela Kesavan; Punnagai Poo Gheetha (co-producer)
- Starring: Parthiban; Vadivelu; Raai Laxmi; Mallika
- Cinematography: Bharanisri
- Edited by: Suresh Urs
- Music by: Bharadwaj
- Production companies: SG Films; Super Star Art Movies
- Release date: 14 October 2005
- Running time: 150 minutes
- Country: India
- Language: Tamil

Kundakka Mandakka is a 2005 Indian Tamil-language comedy film directed by Ashokan and produced by Superstar Art Movies and SG Films. The film stars Parthiban, Vadivelu, Raai Laxmi, and Mallika. The music was composed by Bharadwaj, while editing was done by Suresh Urs. The film was released on 14 October 2005.

== Plot ==
The film revolves around Ilangovan "Ilango", a middle-class youngster with grand aspirations. He dreams of marrying off his sister, Kavitha, to a millionaire and is determined to accumulate wealth. Ilango's life becomes entwined with that of Roopa, the daughter of a wealthy industrialist, whom he falls deeply in love with. Ilango's path repeatedly crosses with that of Chellappa, a small-time thief and broker, leading to a series of comical misadventures. Ilango's mentor identifies Nandha "Nandhu", on the road and takes pity on him, exclaiming he hails from an affluent family. Unbeknownst to Ilango, Nandha is actually searching for rented accommodation through Chellappa's services.

Ilango rents out the upper portion of his building to Nandha, inadvertently bringing his sister Kavitha and Nandha closer together. When Ilango asks Nandha to drop Kavitha off at college, he secretly follows them. En route, Nandha takes Kavitha to meet a family he is acquainted with – the employees of his father's company, who have lost their sole breadwinner. Touched by their plight, Nandha's father, a millionaire, refused to offer assistance, prompting Nandha to disown his wealth and care for the family. As Kavitha witnesses Nandha's kindness and generosity, she begins to develop feelings for him.

Ilango, unaware of Nandha's true identity, mistakenly assumes he is impoverished and devises a plan to separate his sister Kavitha from him. With Chellappa's assistance, Ilango attempts to discredit Nandha by planting cannabis in his possession and hiring a prostitute to tarnish his reputation. However, these schemes ultimately fail, and Kavitha and Nandha's love for each other remains unwavering. Meanwhile, Roopa is betrothed to another man, but Ilango rescues her from her home and brings her to his residence. Ilango then embarks on a quest to find a wealthy groom, only to be swindled in the process.

Nandha's father transforms, seeking forgiveness from his employee's family and welcoming his son Nandha back home. Witnessing this reunion, Ilango experiences a profound realisation that wealth is not the only important aspect of life. Ilango approaches Nandhu's father, seeking his son's hand in marriage for Kavitha. However, Nandhu's father declines, citing that his son cannot marry the sister of a deceitful person like Ilango. Instead, he arranges Nandhu's marriage to the daughter of an education minister. Undeterred, Ilango and Chellappa devise a plan. Disguising themselves as caterers, they infiltrate the wedding hall and cleverly substitute Kavitha for the original bride. As a result, Nandhu and Kavitha are successfully married.

Although Nandhu's father and the education minister are initially outraged, they eventually accept the union. In a joyous turn of events, Ilango and Roopa also tie the knot at the same wedding hall.

== Cast ==
- Parthiban as Ilangovan "Ilango"
- Vadivelu as Chellappa
- Raai Laxmi as Roopa
- Mallika as Kavitha
- Kalairani as Ilango and Kavitha's mother
- Amruth Kalam as Nandha "Nandhu"
- Ravikumar as Nandha's father
- Bayilvan Ranganathan as Rangan, auction agent and goon
- Madhan Bob as Roopa's father
- Raj Madhan
- Nellai Siva as Nellai Siva
- Mohan Raman as a lawyer
- Pondy Ravi as a police officer
- Thyagu as an Education Minister
- Manager Cheena as Roopa's grandfather
- Crane Manohar as a kidnapper
- Suruli Manohar as a kidnapper
- Siva Narayana Murthy as Aarthi's father
- Singamuthu as a fake saint
- Chaams as Roopa's groom
- Vanitha Krishnachandran as Roopa's mother
- Bhuvaneswari as an actress
- Aarthi as one who loses her moped
- Bonda Mani as an auto dealer
- Neelu Nasreen as a victim of Chellappa

== Production ==
The title Kundakka Mandakka was taken from a line from Bharathi Kannamma (1997), also starring Parthiban. The film marked director Asokan Subramanian's third feature film following Thamizhachi (1995) and Ponvizha (1999). 15 days of shooting took place at a busy housing complex in K K Nagar while two songs were picturised in Kodaikanal. The film's cinematography was handled by debutant Bharani Sri who earlier apprenticed with M. S. Prabhu.

== Soundtrack ==
The music was composed by Bharadwaj.

Song	Singers	Lyrics
"8 Thisaigal"	Tippu	Snehan
"Nee Vendum"	Janani Bharadwaj, Srinivas	Snehan
"Mun Jenmam"	Sathya	Snehan
"Vanthutaya"	Vadivelu	Snehan
"Niagara"	Pop Shalini	Snehan
"Vattamittu"	Suchitra	Snehan

== Critical reception ==
Malathi Rangarajan of The Hindu wrote, "Don't look for coherence or logic in "Kundakka Mandakka", because most of the time it is inane humour that rules." Sify wrote, "Enough endured. Instead of viewing this farce, stay at home and watch cartoon network!" Lajjavathi of Kalki wrote the film has gone backwards in terms of storytelling and technical sophistication. It's fine if logic is removed in comedy scenes, but how about removing the brain itself? Cinesouth wrote, "There does not seem to be a great effort on the part of the director, Ashokan. He has placed his faith on the Partiban Vadivelu comedy duo. And they have not disappointed him".

Malini Mannath of Chennai Online wrote, "A comedy track many a time peps up the narration. But when the track itself becomes the basis for an entire film, then only one of two things can happen. Either it can turn into a hilarious caper. Or it can turn into a jarring piece of assault on the senses. 'Gundakka Mandakka' falls in the second category". G. Ulaganathan of Deccan Herald wrote, "The story has many flaws but the brilliant performance by Vadivelu and the hero eclipses these flaws. Bangalore girl Lakshmi Rai oozes glamour and does a fashion parade throughout the movie".
