= Kalavaadiya Pozhuthugal =

2017 Indian film by Thangar Bachan

- Theatrical release poster
- Directed by: Thankar Bachan
- Based on: Saruhugal by Thankar Bachan
- Produced by: K. Karunamoorthy; C. Arunpandian
- Starring: Prabhu Deva; Bhumika Chawla; Prakash Raj
- Cinematography: Thangar Bachan
- Edited by: B. Lenin—C. S. Prem
- Music by: Bharadwaj
- Production company: Ayngaran International
- Distributed by: Ayngaran International
- Release date: 29 December 2017
- Country: India
- Language: Tamil

Kalavaadiya Pozhuthugal (transl. Stolen Moments) is a 2017 Indian Tamil-language romantic drama film written and directed by Thankar Bachan. It stars Prabhu Deva and Bhumika Chawla, while Prakash Raj, Inbanila and Ganja Karuppu play supporting roles. Sathyaraj played a guest role as Periyar E. V. Ramasamy, reprising his role from Periyar (2007). After beginning production in 2009, the film produced by Ayngaran International experienced delays due to the studio's financial problems, before being released on 29 December 2017. It was praised for its story during its release.

== Plot ==
Porchezhiyan (Prabhu Deva) is a car driver and the sole breadwinner of his family, which includes his wife Rani (Inbanila) and daughter Yazhini. Rani, an ambitious woman, is not happy with her husband's generous and lackadaisical nature. On the other hand, Chezhiyan, an ardent devotee of Periyar, believes in the welfare of society as a whole, which Rani cannot agree with, but Rani makes sense most of the time as Chezhiyan's ideologies often fail to feed their little daughter. One day, while Chezhiyan is on the way back from a long trip, he rescues a businessman named Soundararajan (Prakash Raj), who met with an accident. After Chezhiyan ensures medical treatment to Soundararajan, he happens to meet Jayanthi (Bhumika), Soundararajan's wife, when he is about to leave. He hides himself from her, but the sweet and sour memories that he had with her leave him haunting even after he reaches back home. Further, things proceed in such a way that Chezhiyan gets to meet Jayanthi and Soundararajan. The fate which once separated Chezhiyan and Jayanthi is bringing them closer, though they are aware that they cannot be lovers any more like they were in the past.

== Cast ==
- Prabhu Deva as Porchezhiyan
- Prakash Raj as Soundararajan
- Bhumika Chawla as Jayanthi Soundararajan
- Inbanila as Rani
- Ganja Karuppu as Gnanam
- Sathyan as Radha
- Lollu Sabha Jeeva as Chezhiyan's friend
- Chaams as Chezhiyan's friend
- Singamuthu
- Karate Raja as MP's brother
- Nellai Siva
- Scissor Manohar
- Boys Rajan as Doctor
- Sathyaraj as Periyar (guest appearance)

== Production ==
Thangar Bachan took time to convince Prabhu Deva to play the lead role, with the actor turning back on his initial decision to reject the film, and subsequently the venture began principal photography on 25 March 2009. During the making of the film, it was believed that the film may be shot in the US, but the team chose to stay in India, with the shoot finished by late 2009. Bhumika Chawla worked on the film after a brief sabbatical from Tamil films, and shot for Kalavaadiya Pozhthugal alongside her commitments for Sabapathy's Maa with Prithviraj and Srikanth, which was later shelved.

However, the producers' financial troubles meant that the film's release was delayed for 7 years. Likewise Ayngaran's other films shot in the late 2000s like the Jai-starrer Arjunan Kadhali and the Jeevan-starrer Krishnaleelai remain unreleased, while projects such as the A. R. Rahman musical, Kadhir's Manavar Dhinam with Vinay, were shelved after being launched. The team briefly geared up to release the film during 2013 by holding a promotional event, but it was further delayed.

== Soundtrack ==
The music was composed by Bharadwaj, while the audio rights were acquired by Eros Music India. The album released on 31 October 2014 and featured five songs.

Track-List
No.	Title	Lyrics	Singer(s)	Length
1.	"Thedi Thedi"	Vairamuthu	Thiruvudaiyan	3:52
2.	"Kutramulla"	Vairamuthu	Hariharan, Sadhana Sargam	6:26
3.	"Azhagazhage"	Arivumathi	Karthik, Janani Bharadwaj, Kanmani	4:31
4.	"Cheran Enge"	Vairamuthu	Ananthu, Sathyaraj, Mani Kumar	5:28
5.	"Thayavu Seithu"	Vairamuthu	Karthik, Sunitha Menon, Rekha	4:22
Total length:				24:39

== Release ==
After a long delay of seven years, the film finally released on 29 December 2017. The satellite rights of the film were sold to Kalaignar TV.

== Reception ==
Thinkal Menon of The Times of India wrote "Thangar Bachan’s strength has always been strong characters and pure narration. This film, too, has its artistes emoting in the best possible way. A critic from Indiaglitz.com wrote "if you have zen like patience, you might get out with a palatable love story" adding "the film has plenty of nostalgia to offer as you slowly nod and acknowledge to yourself", but "he pace of the film would do no good to the patience of the present day audience, especially when they have paid to watch a movie that is anachronistic". Mani Prabhu of The New Indian Express wrote the film was a "tedious time travel to the nineties", adding "the flashback framing device that Thankar uses to drive home the intensity of the lead pair’s romance is plain archaic" and "even the supposed twists, for want of nifty staging, end up testing our patience". The critic added "to make things worse, Thankar keeps shifting between being a filmmaker and pamphleteer" and "if you are someone who catches a shut eye in the theatres, you could, in fact, wake up to a different film". In contrast, News18.com's Gautaman Bhaskaran wrote the film "endears because of its fascinating story" but "unfortunately having been in the cans for about 10 years or reportedly so, the film may seem somewhat dated", but "then this is only a minor hiccup in a narrative styled with subtlety and a sense of purpose". Baradwaj Rangan wrote for Film Companion, "Elsewhere, we see more of Thangar Bachan’s anger... The director’s titles...and opening credits...stand testimony to his commitment to the Tamil language, and Kalavaadiya Pozhuthugal is suffused with the rage that others do not share his ardour."
