= Vaaimai =

2016 film by A. Senthil Kumar

- Theatrical release poster
- Directed by: A. Senthil Kumar
- Written by: A. Senthil Kumar
- Produced by: S. Mani; S. Thamizhini
- Starring: Shanthanu Bhagyaraj; Ramki; Goundamani; Thiagarajan; Muktha; Manoj Bharathiraja; Urvashi; Prithvi Pandiarajan; Poornima Bhagyaraj
- Narrated by: Vijay Sethupathi
- Cinematography: Rasamathi
- Edited by: Anthony
- Music by: Augath
- Production company: Min Max Movies
- Release date: 8 September 2016
- Country: India
- Language: Tamil

Vaaimai (transl. The Truth) is a 2016 Indian Tamil-language legal drama film written and directed by A. Senthil Kumar. Inspired by the script of Reginald Rose's Twelve Angry Men (1954), the film stars Shanthanu Bhagyaraj and Muktha Bhanu amongst an ensemble cast. Goundamani, Thyagarajan, Ramki, Urvashi, Manoj K. Bharathi, Prithvi Pandiarajan and Poornima Bhagyaraj are also part of the cast. Though production begun in 2013, the film was released, following a production delay, on 8 September 2016.

== Plot ==
A woman stands accused of helping her son assassinate a politician. She needs to defend herself against accusations that she was an accomplice to the plot.

== Cast ==
- Shanthanu Bhagyaraj as Sidharthan
- Thiagarajan as Dheenadayalan
- Muktha Bhanu as Jhanavi
- Goundamani as Dr. Benny Quick
- Ramki as Thirumaaran IPS
- Poornima Bhagyaraj as Devakiammal
- Urvashi as Narayani
- Manoj Bharathiraja as Manibharathi
- Prithvi Pandiarajan as Velan
- Namo Narayana as Namo Narayanan
- Venkat Subha as Gopikrishna
- Rose Venkatesan as Rose IAS
- Ankitha Mohapatra as Chinmayi
- K. Bhagyaraj in a cameo appearance
- Vijay Sethupathi as Narrator

== Production ==
Senthil Kumar chose to make his debut with Vaaimai after his other project, Thirudan featuring Vijay Antony, ran into production troubles during 2012. The film began production in February 2013, with Goundamani making a comeback to acting. It was subsequently shot in places like Delhi, Rishikesh, Haridwar and Kollimalai, but took almost two years to complete, which the director attributed to the inclusion of an animated song sequence. Shanthanu Bhagyaraj, when questioned about the film's similarities to Twelve Angry Men, replied, "To my knowledge, we will not be mentioning the film in the credits, as there have been many jury-based films made, and Vaaimai could be inspired by any of them". Vijay Sethupathi serves as narrator.

== Soundtrack ==
Debutant Auggath composed the music of Vaaimai. The audio launch was held on 5 May 2015. The song "Kanpadum Un Mugham" is the second Tamil song that Bollywood playback singer Alka Yagnik has ever sung after "Idhu Enna Mayam" from Oram Po.

Track listing
No.	Title	Singer(s)	Length
1.	"Vaimaye Vellum"	Vijay Prakash	4.32
2.	"Kanpadum Un Mugham"	Alka Yagnik	3.45
3.	"Matta"	Blaaze, Vijay Prakash	5.18
4.	"Boomiye Saamiye"	Sadhana Sargam	3.18
5.	"Hey Nadu"	S. P. Balasubrahmanyam	5.10
Total length:			22.13

== Release and reception ==
The film was released on 8 September 2016. Vishal Menon from The Hindu called it "a forgettable re-interpretation of an all-time classic" and gave the film a very negative review. A critic from Sify wrote "It's very difficult to tolerate when someone adapt a classic film like Twelve Angry Men with a plodding screenplay, over the top dialogues and dramatic performances! Well, if you are a fan of Twelve Angry Men, better never ever try to watch Vaaimai!". A reviewer from The Times of India noted that the film is "unconvincing, with writing that makes no sense and execution that is laughable".
