= Pyaar Zindagi Hai =

2001 Indian Hindi-language romantic-drama film

- Theatrical release poster
- Directed by: Vijay Sadanah
- Story by: Vasanth
- Based on: Aasai (Tamil)
- Produced by: K.C. Bokadia
- Starring: Ashima Bhalla; Vikas Kalantri; Rajesh Khanna; Asawari Joshi
- Edited by: Govind Dalwadi
- Music by: Bali Brahmbhatt; Jaideep Choudhury
- Release date: 7 September 2001 (India)
- Running time: 157 min
- Country: India
- Language: Hindi
- Box office: ₹11,00,000

Pyaar Zindagi Hai (transl. Love is Life) is a 2001 Indian Hindi-language romantic thriller film directed by Vijay Sadanah. It is a remake of the Tamil film Aasai (1995). The film stars Ashima Bhalla, Vikas Kalantri and Mohnish Bahl and was produced by K.C. Bokadia under the banner of BMB Pictures.

== Plot ==
After the marriage of his daughter, Geeta, with army Major Pratap Singh, widower Hridaynath lives a simple middle-class existence with his unmarried daughter, Priya, in Dehra Dun. Geeta, Pratap and their new-born son, Munna, pay them a visit and live with them for a few days. They find out that Hridaynath is under constant threat from a loan shark he had borrowed money from to get Geeta married. Shortly after that Geeta and Pratap leave back home for Ranikhet, and it then that Hridaynath finds out that his loan has been repaid and that they also have a telephone now - thanks to Pratap.

Quite unknown to Hridaynath, Pratap has set his eyes on Priya and wants her for himself, so much so that he is willing to kill Geeta and get remarried to Priya on the pretext that Munna needs looking after. So to get the ball rolling, he kills Geeta by drugging and then suffocating her with a polythene bag. He then informs her dad and sister that she has died of a heart attack, and convinces them to leave Dehra Dun and live with him in Ranikhet. This is where he plans to seduce Priya in order to marry her and vows no one can dare to come in his way.

Unfortunately for him, Priya has a fiancé Amit that she loves very much and she introduces him to Pratap. Frustrated, Pratap sets out to destroy Amit's character. First, he takes advantage of a careless Sikh man in their way and deliberately arranges for them to bump into him and steals Amit's wallet in the ensuing melee. Predictably when Amit notices his wallet missing, he confronts the Sikh man and makes a fool of himself, as it is Pratap who has the wallet. When he suspects and attempts to frisk Pratap, Hridaynath chastises him and Pratap escapes.

Pratap also tries various means to defame Amit like getting his thugs to beat up Amit and forcibly pouring liquor in his mouth and leaving him looking drunk on the road. Pratap even kills Priya's dog that Amit has gifted. Finally Amit complains to Pratap's army boss, Lt. Col. Jagat Khanna, who then subsequently catches Pratap nuzzling against Priya's photo lovingly, and realizes that Amit is speaking the truth. He chastises Pratap and asks him to watch it and also casually inquires about Geeta's death. It is clear that Lt. Col Khanna no longer holds Major Pratap in esteem. Pratap, fearing exposure, kills Khanna with his car during one of his early morning jogs.

Finally, Pratap decides to implement his final move — he frames Amit for drug trafficking and has him arrested. He then consoles the sad Hridaynath and smoothly weaves in his request to marry Priya to care for his child. Disappointed with Amit and impressed with what he sees as a loving son-in-law, Hridaynath readily agrees, to Pratap's glee! Pratap then visits Amit in prison and boasts about his dastardly plan to destroy Amit, seduce and marry Priya and its successful conclusion culminating in Hridaynath's blessing. Simultaneously, Hridaynath and Priya discover the dead Geeta's letter warning about Pratap's lust for Priya and fear of her life. Hridaynath also discovers Pratap's diary which lays out the plot entirely.

They try to leave, but Pratap returns, notices the letter and diary in open view and knocks Hridaynath unconscious when he confronts him. He tries to sexually assault Priya, but Amit who escaped from prison rescues her and beats Pratap unconscious. When Pratap awakes, Hridaynath has filled the room with explosive propane gas and threatens to blow them both up with a match, unless Pratap suffocates himself to death exactly as he did to Geeeta, with a polythene bag and string that Hridaynath has provided. Pratap pleading pathetically fails to move Hridaynath and puts the bag over his own head and ties the string around his neck tight. Unable to bear the suffocation, he rips the bag off, when Hridaynath lights the match and detonates a deadly blast, killing them both.

The movie ends with police releasing and apologizing to Amit and him reuniting with Priya after this horrific family tragedy.

== Cast ==
- Ashima Bhalla as Priya Vashisht
- Vikas Kalantri as Amit Birla
- Mohnish Bahl as Major Pratap Singh
- Rajesh Khanna as Hridaynath
- Asawari Joshi as Geeta P. Singh
- Upasna Singh as folk singer
- Shahbaz Khan as Lt. Col. Jagat Khanna
- Azad Khatri

== Soundtrack ==
Pyaar Zindagi Hai

Soundtrack album
- Released: 1 December 2001 (India)
- Genre: Feature film soundtrack
- Labels: BMB Music & Magnatics Limited

chronology
Pyaar Zindagi Hai	--

All lyrics are written by Sameer, Surendra Mishra and Preet Nihal; all music is composed by Bali Brahmabhatt and Jaideep Choudhury

Track listing
No.	Title	Singer(s)	Length
1.	"Abhi Abhi"	Shaan	4:52
2.	"Dharti Hai Pyari"	Poornima and Mohammed Aziz
3.	"Na Phulo Ke Khiline"	Udit Narayan and Kavita Krishnamurthy	5:00
4.	"Phoolon Ne Kaha"	Kumar Sanu and Kavita Krishnamurthy	6:30
5.	"Humsafar"	Silk Route	5:20
6.	"Pyar Zindagi Hai"	Sonu Nigam and Kavita Krishnamurthy	7:20
7.	"Sama Hai Suhana"	Kumar Sanu	5:30
8.	"Morni"	Silk Route	5:04
9.	"Sau Rab Di"	Abhijeet and Alka Yagnik	7:04
10.	"Sau Rab Di (Sad)"	Abhijeet	2:09

== Release and reception ==
Pyaar Zindagi Hai opened in theatres on 7 September 2001. It grossed over ₹1,100,000 (US$16,929) worldwide. The film collected ₹1,098,500 in the opening week. Taran Adarsh wrote, "The only saving grace of the enterprise is the twist in its story [...] Otherwise, the story meanders on the beaten path, which doesn't excite the viewer one bit."
