= Gun (2011 film) =

- Directed by: Harish Raj
- Written by: Harish Raj
- Produced by: K. Murali; Harish Raj
- Starring: Harish Raj; Mallika Kapoor; Nikitha
- Cinematography: Ananth Urs
- Music by: Ronnie Raphel
- Release date: 25 February 2011
- Country: India
- Language: Kannada

Gun is a 2011 Indian Kannada-language action film directed by Harish Raj and starring himself, Mallika Kapoor and Nikitha. The film was released on 25 February 2011.

== Plot ==
The life of the protagonist is affected by a 'Gun' in two times in this film. Both the times he was about to accept the love. The life of engineering student Ganesh (Harish Raj) takes curious turn when beautiful Vandana (Nikitha) accept him in her life. At the last moment the bloody confusion in the market place where the cop is chasing the underworld don becomes very costly in the life of Ganesha. Wasim Khan brother from Dubai shoots at but it falls to Vandana. Frightened with this development Ganesha is lost in agony. He gives up his education and takes to drinking.

When Mallika (Mallika Kapoor) the TV6 journalist knows Ganesha is different she makes it a point to get education for him that becomes distant dream for him. That is mainly because the corporation councilor Wasim Khan is on the revenge saga. For the second time Ganesh on the verge of accepting the love faces the same situation. This time Mallika is hit by a bullet on the right shoulder.

In the clash of Wasim Khan and Ganesha lot of heads roll and the director takes the liberty of showing himself the protagonist as a cop in the end.

== Cast ==
- Harish Raj as Ganesh
- Mallika Kapoor as Mallika
- Nikita Thukral as Vandana
- Rangayana Raghu as Wasim Khan
- P. N. Sathya
- Rachana Maurya as an item number "Yeh Ali Baba"
- Kiran Rathod as an item number "Yenne Yaaru"
- Mandeep Roy
- Bullet Prakash
- Mohan Juneja
- M. S. Umesh
- Kuri Prathap
- Sathish Ninasam as Ganesh's friend

== Soundtrack ==
The music was composed by Ronnie Raphel. Kalyan and Kaviraj wrote the lyrics for the songs.

Song	Singer	Lyrics
"Yenne Yaaru"	Tippu	Yogaraj Bhat
"Ella Ballava"	Udit Narayan	V. Manohar
"Thaaja Thaaja"	Chinmayi, Ranjith	Kaviraj
"Yeh Ali Baba"	Sunidhi Chauhan	V. Nagendra Prasad
"Bissi Bissi"	Ajay Warrior, Mahathi	K. Kalyan
"Kusumada Baana"	Rajesh Krishnan	Jayanth Kaikini

== Reception ==
=== Critical response ===
Shruti Indira Lakshminarayana from Rediff.com scored the film at 1.5 out of 5 stars and says "Camera work is good in the song. There is an item number even. Kiran Rathore has been roped in for the song, but the music and the actress leave very little to be desired! The film sees the hero mouthing a dialogue on how it looks like Kannada films are stuck in the past (referring to same old formulas, not to mention the hugely popular flashback scenes). Sadly Gun is no exception". A critic from Bangalore Mirror wrote "HM Ramachandra-KM Vishnuvardhana team’s cinematography certainly lifts the film. Ranie Raphel comes up with some impressive tunes though the background score is annoying in parts.A sincere effort should have been the description for Gun, but it is more of a desperate attempt". A critic from The Times of India scored the film at 3.5 out of 5 stars and wrote "The dramatic climax is quite edge-of-the-seat stuff. While Harish Raj has proved he is as brilliant a director as an actor, Mallika Kapoor and Nikhita have done a wonderful job. Rangayana Raghu as Wasim is excellent and Sangeetha is lively as Wasim's wife. Rachana Mourya entertains with an item number. Manju Mandavya's brilliant dialogues, crisp cinematography by H M Ramachandra and K M Vishnuvardhan (song sequences) and lively music by Ronnie Raphel that make Guna special. Deepu S Kumar needs a special mention for impressive editing".
