= Vijay Kalantri =

Indian industrialist

Vijay Govardhandas Kalantri
- Born: January 5, 1949 (age 77); Mumbai, Maharashtra, India
- Education: G.C.D. & TEXTILE DIPLOMA
- Occupation: Industrialist
- Spouse: Mohini Vijay Kalantri
- Children: 1. Vishal Vijay Kalantri; 2. Sangeeta Jain; 3. Vikas Kalantri; 4. Vinay Vijay Kalantri
- Website: https://aiaiindia.com/ https://www.wtcmumbai.org/

Dr. Vijay Govardhandas Kalantri (born 1949) is an Indian industrialist. He is the Chairman and Managing Director of Balaji Infra Projects Limited (BIPL) and Dighi Port Limited (DPL). He is the President of All India Association of Industries, Chairman of World Trade Center, Mumbai and is Director International of World Trade Centers Association, New York City.

== Early life and education ==
Vijay Kalantri was born in Mumbai in 1949 and is a native of Merta City, Rajasthan. He did his schooling at Hindi Vidya Bhavan, Mumbai, and did a Diploma in Textile from Sasmira, Mumbai. Later, he married Mohini Vijay Kalantri. His sister Kamla Jhawar lives in Raipur. He has an elder brother, Ghanshyam Kalantry, who stays in Mumbai.

== Career ==
Vijay Kalantri has been a Director of Dena Bank, Canara Bank and is a member of the Reserve Bank of India’s Standing Committee on Small Scale Industry, Exchange Control and the All India Export Advisory Committee. He is on the National Advisory Board of Small Industries Development Bank of India and the Advisory Board of Securities and Exchange Board of India and as an independent, non-executive Director of VIP Industries Ltd.

Kalantri is a member of the Honorable Prime Minister’s Task Force, Small and medium-sized enterprises, State Gramin Corporation, Advisory Board of Corporate Governance Committee of SEBI and the Central Council of Customs and Excise. He represents India at World Economic Forum and at the World Trade Organization ministerial conferences.

He is a board member of Africa Economic & e-Governance Forum. He is on advisory board of Green Port South Asia. Kalantri is a former treasurer of state congress. He is the President of All India Association of Industries(AIAI) and Chairman of MVIRDC World Trade Centre Mumbai. AIAI has initiated Indo Polish Chamber of Commerce and Industries (IPCCI), Indian Council of Foreign Trade (ICOFT), Indo-Mauritius Chamber of Commerce (IMCC), Young Entrepreneur Society (YES) as its associates. AIAI has also promoted Russia India Trade House Mumbai (RITHM).

== Awards and honours ==
- Dr. Vijay Kalantri, President, All India Association of Industries & Honorary Consul of Uzbekistan in Mumbai was felicitated with the Outstanding Honorary Consul in India award by Ms. Meenakshi Lekhi, Minister of State External Affairs & Culture, Government of India.
- Dr Vijay Kalantri, President, All India Association of Industries being felicitated by Bangladesh Consulate for being instrumental in building successful trade relations between Bangladesh and India on the Occasion of Golden Jubilee of Independence of Bangladesh & 50th Anniversary of Victory Day. By the Bangladesh High Commission with Mr. Lutfor Rahman Deputy High Commission Bangladesh, Mumbai, India Seen in the picture-Lt Gen. Kuldip Singh Brar Commander. Vijay Vadhera, President, Indian Navy Foundation
- Pushkin Medal, Russian State Award for contribution in promoting Russian-Indian cultural, scientific and trade cooperation.
- The highest Polish civilian honour the Commander Cross of the Order of Merit by the President of the Republic of Poland in 2005, H.E. Mr. Kwasniewski for contribution to the growth of co-operation between the Republic of Poland and the Republic of India.

== Events ==
- Uzbekistan can be gateway to 250 million consumer market of CIS
- AIAI & WTC promote business opportunities in Mauritius
- India-Thailand ties to see new high in hospitality and construction materials
- Parliament of Iran approves Double Taxation Avoidance Agreement with India, says Mr. Foladgar
- Maharashtra industries minister Subhash Desai keen on Thai touch for state's food, dairy processing and allied SME sectors
- Maharashtra looks for Thailand's support in food, dairy processing and ..
- “India needs to create an export culture”, say experts
- Sri Lanka wants to elevate relationship with India to higher level
- Rajkumar Hirani's Sanju becomes first production from Bollywood ever ...
- Ssekandi meets top India businesses leaders
- Trade takes centre stage: Global Economic Summit brings together ..
- Salman Khan and Katrina Kaif dazzle at book launch in Mumbai
- GST Council meet begins today: 4 things Modi must do to solve ...
- Uddhav Thackeray: 'I only have to say mitron as it is equally dangerous'
- Odisha Govt promoted the trade and business potentials of the State at ...
- India Australia Strategic Business alliance seek AIAI and WTC Mumbai support to form a Task Force to promote trade and investment between Australia and India
- Vietnam has open policy for India to make it a leading trade partner, says Mr. Anh
- India and Iran can sign preferential trade agreement to promote agro trade
- Uganda plans dedicated industrial park for Indian firms, says Hon’ble Minister Mr. Okello
- BRICS and South Asia can explore settlement in local currency to boost intra-regional trade
- Taiwanese firms eager to invest in manufacturing sector in India, says Ms. Chen
- Da Nang aims to be Hi-Tech and innovation center of Asia with Indian collaboration, says Mr. Son
- Taiwanese firms looking India as promising investment destination
- India needs policy on viability gap funding to make circular economy a viable business model
- Turkey-India trade can double to USD 20 billion, says Mr. Aydin
- 21st Century leaders should revive indigenous values to create harmonious society
- DP World invites Indian firms to the world’s 3rd largest re-export hub
