= Shanthanu Bhagyaraj =

Indian actor (born 1986)

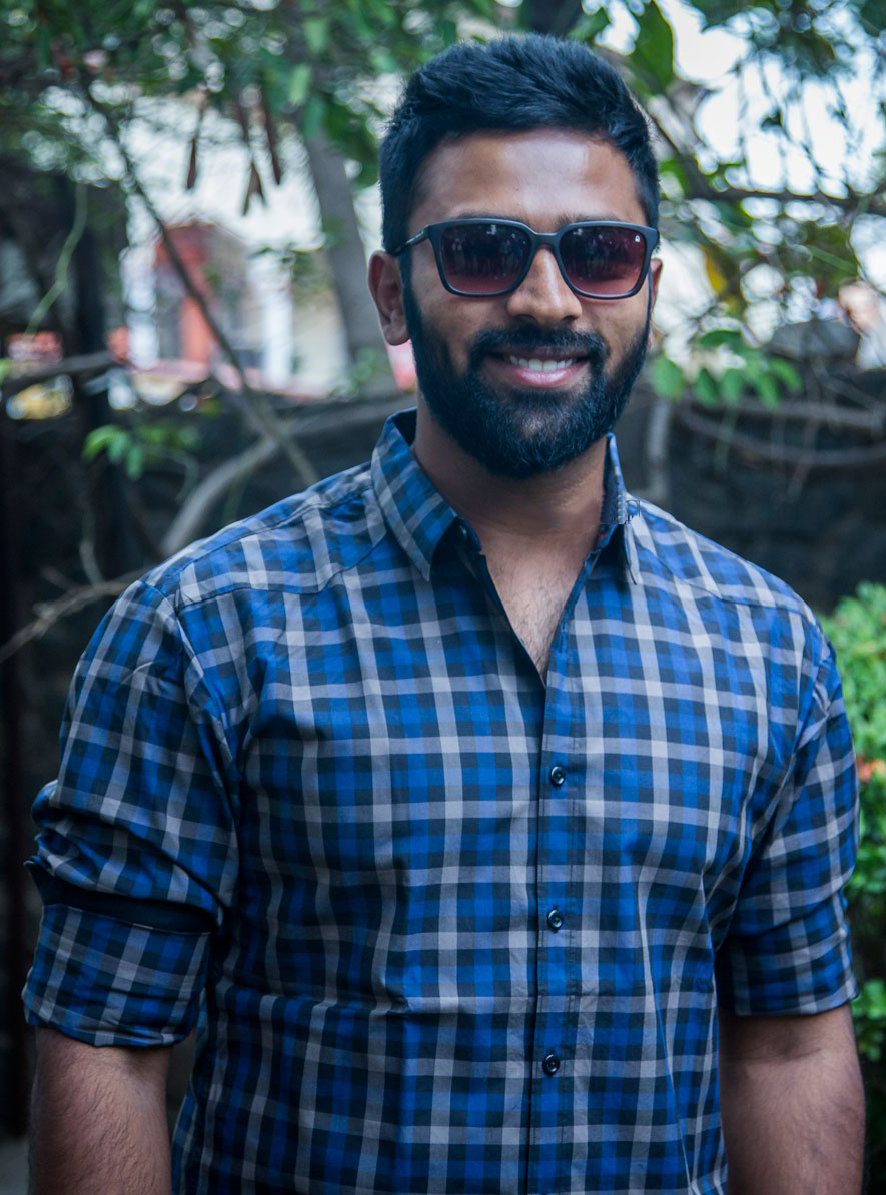
- Shanthanu at Vaaimai Press Meet
- Born: 24 August 1986 (age 40)
- Years active: 1998 (Child artist); 2008–present
- Spouse: Keerthi (m. 2015)
- Parents: K. Bhagyaraj (father); Poornima Bhagyaraj (mother)

Shanthanu Bhagyaraj (born 24 August 1986) is an Indian actor who has worked predominantly in Tamil cinema, apart from a few Malayalam films. The son of late actor-director K. Bhagyaraj and actress Poornima Bhagyaraj, Shanthanu appeared as a child artist in his father's Vettiya Madichu Kattu (1998), before making his debut as a lead actor in the romantic comedy Sakkarakatti (2008).

== Career ==
=== 1998-2008 ===
Shanthanu made his acting debut as a child artist in his father Bhagyaraj's Tamil film Vettiya Madichu Kattu (1998), and then worked as assistant director to his father in his sister Saranya Bhagyaraj's debut project Parijatham (2006).

Shanthanu appeared in his first lead role in the Tamil film Sakkarakatti (2008), appearing alongside actresses Ishita Sharma and Vedhika. His performance received mixed reviews with Behindwoods.com stating: "Shanthanu has to play a thinly sketched hero, but he puts energy and charm into everything he does" and that "he is more than promising- he's star material, and he'll survive this wreck". Another critic at Sify.com stated that he "has that star quality to him which is so rare to find these days, but is wasted in a role in which he just romances his heroines and dances". Despite having a popular soundtrack composed by A. R. Rahman, the film received largely negative reviews and became a commercial failure. Despite the negative reception to the film, Shanthanu was recognised with the Best Male Debut Actor award at the Filmfare Awards and the Vijay Awards.

=== 2009-2017 ===
After Sakkarakatti, Shanthanu appeared in the Malayalam film Angel John (2009), starring alongside Mohanlal and Nithya Menen, as a suicidal youth who is rescued by an angel. Despite the high-profile cast, the film and Shanthanu's performance received mixed reviews and it did not perform well commercially. The failure of his initial films meant that his next projects had significantly smaller budgets and lower profile releases. His next release was his father's bilingual directorial venture Siddu +2 (2010), with the failure of the Tamil version causing the Telugu version Love in Hyderabad, to be shelved. Though the romantic comedy Kandaen (2011) received positive reviews and took a good opening, his subsequent films including the action drama Aayiram Vilakku (2011) and Thangar Bachan's Ammavin Kaipesi (2012).

The courtroom drama Vaaimai (2016) received average reviews. In an interview in 2016, Shanthanu revealed that challenging career choices had plagued his film career and he would subsequently not take advice from his father regarding film offers. He mentioned his regret at missing out on potential projects he had been offered including Boys (2003), Kaadhal (2004) Subramaniapuram (2008) and Kalavani (2010).

Shanthanu was then cast by Parthiban to play the lead role in Koditta Idangalai Nirappuga (2017), with the director suggesting that he was keen to portray tribute to his mentor K. Bhagyaraj, by casting his son in a film. The actor called the film his "re-launch in Tamil cinema" and underwent a makeover to portray the lead role of a non-resident Indian who falls in love with a married woman played by Parvathy Nair. Shanthanu won positive reviews for his performance, with a critic from The New Indian Express stating: "Shanthnu is a revelation here" and "with controlled, mature take on his role, Shanthnu displays subtle nuances of expression as Kevin travels from uncertainty and confusion, to guilt and regret". In 2017, he also acted in Adhiroopan's drama Mupparimanam, where he portrayed a medical student.

=== 2020-present ===
In 2020, he played a main role in the family drama Vaanam Kottattum, which was co-written by Mani Ratnam. He also starred in Master (2021), starring Vijay and Vijay Sethupathi. After Chimbu Deven's Kasada Thapara, he starred in an adult comedy, Murungakkai Chips. Shanthanu acted later in the drama films Raavana Kottam (2023), Blue Star (2024) and Balti (2025).

== Personal life ==
Shanthanu was born to actor Bhagyaraj on 24 August 1986. He married Keerthi "Kiki", the daughter of dance choreographer Jayanthi, in 2015. He also has a YouTube channel with his wife called With Love Shanthnu Kiki.

== Filmography ==
- All films are in Tamil, unless otherwise noted.

Key
†	Denotes films that have not yet been released

As actor

Year	Title	Role	Notes	Ref
1998	Vettiya Madichu Kattu	Sonu	Child artist	
2008	Sakkarakatti	Yuvaraj	Won - Filmfare Best South Male Debut; Vijay Award for Best Debut Actor; ITFA Best New Actor Award	
2009	Angel John	Maradonna Joseph	Malayalam film	
2010	Siddu +2	Siddharth (Siddu)		
2011	Kandaen	Vasanth		
2011	Aayiram Vilakku	Gopal		
2012	Ammavin Kaipesi	Annamalai		
2014	Kathai Thiraikathai Vasanam Iyakkam	Himself	Guest appearance	
2016	Vaaimai	Siddharthan		
2017	Koditta Idangalai Nirappuga	Kevin		
2017	Mupparimanam	Kathir		
2020	Vaanam Kottatum	Ramanathan		
2020	Paava Kadhaigal	Saravanan (Thangam)	Netflix anthology film; segment: Thangam	
2021	Master	Bhargav		
2021	Kasada Thapara	Isaac	Sony LIV hyperlink film; segment: Sadhiyaadal	
2021	Murungakkai Chips	Arjun		
2023	Raavana Kottam	Senguttuvan		
2024	Blue Star	Rajesh		
2025	Balti	Kumar / Dash	Malayalam-Tamil bilingual film	

=== Short films ===
- Konjam Corona Naraiyya Kadhal (KoCoNaKa) (2020)

=== Songs ===
- Lipstick (2015) from the album Glassmates
- Oru Chance Kudu (2020)
- Enga Pora De (2020)
- Gundumalli (2021)

=== Television ===
Year	Program	Role	Language	Channel	Notes	Ref
2015	Let's Dance Season 2	Judge	Malayalam	Amrita TV		
2015	Let's Dance Season 3	Judge	Malayalam	Amrita TV		
2018	Dance Jodi Dance (season 2)	Judge	Tamil	Zee Tamil		
2023	Story of Things	Britto	Tamil	SonyLIV	Segment: Car	
2023	MY3	Eliyas	Tamil	Disney+ Hotstar		

== Discography ==
=== As singer ===
Year	Movie	Song	Composer	Notes
2014	Kathai Thiraikathai Vasanam Iyakkam	"Live The Moment"	S. Thaman	along with Venkat Prabhu, Premji Amaran, Nakul
2016	Vaaimai	"Hey Naadu"	Augath	along with S. P. Balasubrahmanyam
2020	Enga Pora De	"Enga Pora De"	Dharan Kumar	Album Song
