= Nayee Padosan =

- Directed by: B. H. Tharun Kumar
- Written by: Story and Screenplay: Ikram Akhtar; Dialogues: Raghuveer Shekhawat
- Produced by: Nitin Manmohan
- Starring: Mahek Chahal; Anuj Sawhney; Rahul Bhat; Vikas Kalantri; Aslam Khan
- Cinematography: K. Rajkumar
- Edited by: Ravikumar
- Music by: Songs: Shankar–Ehsaan–Loy; Background Score: Surinder Sodhi
- Production company: Neha Arts
- Release date: 6 June 2003
- Country: India
- Language: Hindi

Nayee Padosan (transl. New Neighbour) is a 2003 Hindi-language romantic comedy film directed by B. H. Tharun Kumar and produced by Nitin Manmohan, starring Mahek Chahal, Vikas Kalantri, Anuj Sawhney and Aslam Khan in the lead roles. The film is partially inspired by the Tamil films Indru Poi Naalai Vaa and Chashme Buddoor, and was a moderate success at the box office. The film was also the Bollywood debut of Mahek Chahal.

== Plot ==
Raju is an unemployed MBA graduate from a simple Gujarati family who spends his time playing cricket with the young kids in the colony where he lives. One fine day, he finds a neighbour in Pooja Iyengar, who he falls in love with.

Raja is an aspiring rockstar who despises classical music. During a college festival, he has a confrontation with Pooja but ends up losing both the confrontation and his heart to her. Ram is an aspiring actor who moved from rural Punjab to become a big actor in Mumbai. He too falls for Pooja after an encounter with her.

Later, Raja and Ram shift to the colony where Pooja lives, ultimately crossing paths with Raju in the process. All three of them make a pact to compete for Pooja's hand in marriage by trying to impress her. However, the entry of Pooja's childhood friend Prabhu, who is a favourite with the Iyengars, pushes the trio to a setback, but it only fuels their aspirations.

The film goes through various emotional graphs where the three boys have their individual shares of gains and losses vis-à-vis their competitors. The girl doesn't reveal her feelings until a certain change of events makes her realize whom she really loves and would want to spend the rest of her life with.

== Cast ==
- Mahek Chahal as Pooja Iyengar
- Anuj Sawhney as Raju
- Vikas Kalantri as Ram
- Aslam Khan as Raja
- Rahul Bhat in dual roles as Prabhu and the gangster acting as Prabhu's clone
- Vijay Kashyap as Keshav Iyengar (Pooja's father)
- Yusuf Hussain as Mr. Venkatesh Iyengar (Pooja's grandfather)
- Shabnam Kapoor as Gayatri Iyengar (Pooja's mother)
- Seema Kapoor as Priya Natrajan

== Music ==
Nayee Padosan

Soundtrack album by Shankar–Ehsaan–Loy
- Released: 4 April 2003 (India)
- Genre: Feature film soundtrack Fusion music
- Label: Saregama
- Producer: Nitin Manmohan

Shankar–Ehsaan–Loy chronology
Armaan (2003)	Nayee Padosan (2003)	Kuch Naa Kaho (2003)

The soundtrack contains 7 songs composed by the award-winning trio Shankar–Ehsaan–Loy. Lyrics were by Sameer.

Track #	Song	Singer(s)	Duration
1	"Sari Sari Raina"	Shaan & Shweta Pandit	4:42
2	"Mera Man"	Mahalakshmi Iyer	6:12
3	"Chori Nahi Kee"	Mahalakshmi Iyer & Shankar Mahadevan	5:03
4	"Rang De Rang De"	Babul Supriyo, Mahalakshmi Iyer & Shaan	4:39
5	"Dil Mein, Dhadkano Mein"	Balram, Shaan & Shankar Mahadevan	5:53
6	"Ek Bechainee"	Neha Rajpal & Vijay Prakash	5:38
7	"Naye Padosan" (Fusion Mix)	Shankar–Ehsaan–Loy	1:55
