= Solla Solla Inikkum =

- Theatrical release poster
- Directed by: G. Muraliappas
- Written by: G. Muraliappas
- Starring: Navdeep; Madhumitha; Mallika Kapoor; Suja Varunee; Sara Alambara
- Cinematography: Arthur A. Wilson
- Edited by: V. T. Vijayan
- Music by: Bharadwaj
- Distributed by: M Cinema
- Release date: 18 September 2009
- Country: India
- Language: Tamil

Solla Solla Inikkum (transl. Tastes sweet on talking more about it) is a 2009 Indian Tamil-language romantic comedy film directed by G. Muraliappas, who previously directed Raasi. The film stars Navdeep, Madhumitha, and Mallika Kapoor, Suja Varunee, and Sara Alambara, while Prakash Raj, Abhinay, Sathyan, Vijayakumar, Ashish Vidyarthi, and Livingston play supporting roles. The music was composed by Bharadwaj with cinematography by Arthur A. Wilson and editing by V. T. Vijayan. The film was released on 18 September 2009.

== Plot ==
Sathya completes his degree and spends time with his friends. Life goes uncomplicated for him until he meets Anjali. What starts as friendship between them develops into love. When Sathya proposes to Anjali, she turns it down, saying that it was only friendship and nothing more than that. Next comes Meghna, and what starts as love between them ends the same. Meghna insists they part as lovers as it was all a time pass for her. Afterwards, Sathya comes across Radhika. They become close friends, and so is Sathya's friend Guru with her. When Sathya decides to inform Radhika about his desire to marry her, she throws a bombshell by saying that she and Guru are in love with each other. Guru takes her for a ride but deserts her after using her. Sathya steps in and ensures that both get married. Guru seeks solace with Bhadri Narayanan. A do-gooder and influential man in the society, he takes sides with Guru. Sathya goes hammer and tongs and ensures that all ends well. Also enters Anu in his life.

== Cast ==
- Navdeep as Sathya
- Madhumitha as Radhika Jayaraman
- Mallika Kapoor as Anuradha
- Suja Varunee as Megha
- Sara Alambara as Anjali
- Prakash Raj as Bhadri Narayanan
- Abhinay as Guru
- Sathyan as Sathyan
- Vijayakumar as Sathya's father
- Ashish Vidyarthi as Madhiyazhagan
- Livingston as Jayaraman
- Devadarshini as Bhadri Narayanan's wife
- Sriranjani as Sathya's mother
- Meera Krishnan as Guru's mother
- Charle as Police Officer
- Mohan Raman as Sathya's father's friend
- Bava Lakshmanan as Margil
- Alex
- Bharathi Kannan

== Soundtrack ==
The soundtrack was composed by Bharadwaj.

Track listing
No.	Title	Lyrics	Singers	Length
1.	"Sagiye Sagiye"	Na. Muthukumar	Benny Dayal	5:12
2.	"Rajathi Rajaillae"	Na. Muthukumar	Benny Dayal	4:36
3.	"Kathal Oru Pallikkoodam"	Viveka	M. M. Abdulla	4:58
4.	"Hey Azhagiya Penne"	Viveka	Haricharan	4:10
5.	"Atcham Vetkam"	Thangam Murthy	Janani Bharadwaj	4:22
Total length:				24:13

== Critical reception ==
Pavithra Srinivasan of Rediff.com gave the film two out of five stars and noted that "Solla Solla Inikkum has good principles and starts out meaning well and were it not for the dull and clichéd presentation, might have actually stood a chance of clicking with its audience". S. R. Ashok Kumar of The Hindu wrote, "The director, who is also in charge of story, screenplay and dialogue, seems to have lost his grip right from the first reel". The New Indian Express wrote, "The theme seemed an interesting one. But unfortunately, the interest couldn't go beyond the concept stage".
