= Vathiyar =

- DVD cover
- Directed by: A. Venkatesh
- Written by: A. Venkatesh; G. K. Gopinath (dialogues)
- Story by: Arjun
- Produced by: V. Palanivel; A. C. Anandan
- Starring: Arjun; Mallika Kapoor
- Cinematography: K. S. Selvaraj
- Edited by: P. Saisuresh
- Music by: D. Imman
- Production company: AP Film Garden
- Release date: 21 October 2006
- Running time: 170 minutes
- Country: India
- Language: Tamil

Vathiyar (/vɑːðjɑːr/ transl. Teacher) is a 2006 Indian Tamil-language action film directed by A. Venkatesh from a story written by Arjun. The film stars Arjun and Mallika Kapoor, while Vadivelu, Pradeep Rawat, Prakash Raj, Manivannan and Amit Tiwari play supporting roles. The soundtrack and background score were composed by D. Imman. Vathiyaar was released on 21 October Deepavali 2006.

== Plot ==
The film opens with former Chief Minister Naachiyar being sentenced to prison for his involvement in the Housing Board construction scam. Refusing to pay the penalty, Naachiyar vows to exact vengeance on the incumbent Chief Minister for putting him behind bars. Meanwhile, notorious gangster Veera terrorizes the public, prompting them to seek help from Annadurai "Dorai". Dorai confronts Veera and his men, ultimately killing Veera. ACP Eshwara Pandian investigates the scene and identifies Dorai as the perpetrator. However, he is frustrated by the lack of evidence to arrest Dorai. Eshwara Pandian warns Dorai that he will apprehend him once he gathers sufficient proof, criticizing Dorai's use of violence to achieve justice. Dorai runs an orphanage called Annai Illam. His violent methods have estranged him from his mother and younger sister, Susheela. His mother works in a garment factory to make ends meet. During a medical camp at the orphanage, Dorai discovers that contaminated water is harming the children. He confronts Rajaram, the owner of the Zeo Leather factory, for polluting the water source. Seizing the opportunity, Dorai rallies the factory employees to strike against Rajaram, using their protest to demand the installation of a water processing unit in the factory, enraging Rajaram.

Anjali, a TV reporter hosting a prank show, becomes smitten with Dorai after witnessing his commitment to public service. She devises a plan to get close to him by pretending to be an orphan and convinces the orphanage attender, Ayyanar, to let her stay at Annai Illam. Her wealthy father also moves in, hiding their true identities. Together, they persuade the orphanage inmates to encourage Dorai to marry Anjali. Meanwhile, Dorai's sister Susheela is engaged to Prakash, and their wedding expenses become a concern. Dorai's mother refuses his financial help, fearing his money may be tainted by his violent past. Unbeknownst to Susheela, Dorai secretly facilitates Prakash's promotion to manager at Zeo Leather Factory, with the help of Rajaram, who has since reformed. Three months pass, and Naachiyar is released from prison. Dorai's vigilante activities continue, as he kills a rapist and sends the body to the police station, infuriating ACP Eshwara Pandian. However, Eshwara Pandian lacks evidence to apprehend Dorai. Anjali misinterprets Dorai's kindness towards a woman, assuming he is having an affair. Subramaniam clarifies that the woman is Veera's wife, affected with AIDS, and Dorai has been discreetly supporting her. Subramaniam then reveals a flashback about Dorai's past, shedding light on his motivations and actions.

In Kumbakonam, Dorai worked as a teacher. During a paper correction trip to Trichy, he rescued Subramaniam from a group of goons. Additionally, he saved a teenage girl from a misbehaving college teacher and confronted him. This incident led to Dorai's dismissal from school due to his violent confrontation. Dorai's mother was upset about his job loss and warned him against using violence in the name of righteousness. Meanwhile, Manickavel, another teacher, sought Dorai's help regarding substandard facilities at his school. Despite previously reporting the issue to the education department, Manickavel turned to Dorai due to their inaction. However, Dorai declined, citing his mother's advice to remain calm and focus on teaching. Tragedy struck when the school mentioned by Manickavel suffered a devastating fire, claiming the lives of 48 children due to inadequate escape facilities. Overcoming his mother's objections, Dorai confronted the district education officer, inspection officer, revenue officer, Tahsildar, Health Officer, Health department Joint Director, Fire officer, District Education officer, and chief education officer, to confess to accepting bribes and their inaction leading to the tragedy. However, his actions led to his arrest and subsequent conviction for killing the District Education Officer. Dorai was sentenced to a minimum of 3 years in prison.

In the present, Anjali learns about Dorai's past and recognizes his kind-hearted nature, and also Dorai accepts Anjali's love. His mother, who had previously disapproved of his violent methods, now understands his intentions and accepts him. Meanwhile, Eshwarapandian plots to trap Dorai, informing Naachiyar about his activities. Naachiyar, seeking revenge, orchestrates a bombing plot in Chennai. Dorai thwarts the plan by killing the terrorists involved and notifies Naachiyar. Naachiyar retaliates by poisoning the orphanage food, killing Lakshmi and hospitalizing others. Dorai seeks vengeance, attacking Naachiyar's farmhouse. However, Naachiyar shoots Dorai and buries him in a coffin. Miraculously, Dorai escapes and recuperates in a nearby clinic. Upon learning of Dorai's escape, Naachiyar orders the police commissioner to execute an encounter killing. Eshwarapandian kidnaps five Human Rights Commission members and vindicates Dorai's righteousness, stating that Dorai has done what the police couldn't - protect the public. Eshwarapandian discloses his deliberate attempts to cross paths with Dorai, utilizing him to eliminate criminals, and implores the members to save Dorai from Naachiyar's planned encounter killing.

On Vinayaka Chathurthi, Dorai secretly meets Eshwarapandian at a hospital, where he reveals that Eshwarapandian had indeed aided Dorai in eliminating criminals. Eshwarapandian discloses that Naachiyar stabbed him for helping Dorai. With his last breath, Eshwarapandian expresses his support for Dorai and shares the truth. Determined to stop Naachiyar, Dorai confronts him, only to learn that a bomb has been implanted in the Ganesha statue, which is now part of a procession, threatening thousands of lives. Dorai bravely beats Naachiyar and his men, then rushes to the beach, where the procession will culminate. With seconds to spare, Dorai successfully defuses the bomb hidden within the statue. However, in the chaos, Naachiyar mortally wounds Dorai. Enraged and motivated by his mother's words, Dorai kills Naachiyar.

== Cast ==
- Arjun as Annadurai alias "Durai"
- Mallika Kapoor as Anjali
- Vadivelu as Ayyanar, orphanage attender
- Prakash Raj as ACP Eashwarapandian I.P.S
- Pradeep Rawat as Naachiyar, Former Chief Minister
- Manivannan as Subramaniam, orphanage supervisor
- Sujatha as Durai's mother
- Devan as Rajaram, Zeo Leather factory Owner
- Thalaivasal Vijay as Manickavel, school teacher
- Vennira Aadai Moorthy as Anjali's father
- Mahanadhi Shankar as Veera's sidekick
- Vijay Krishnaraj as a Commissioner
- Manobala as Onaandi, Ayyanar's father
- Pammal Ravi
- O. A. K. Sundar as a school teacher
- Sathyan as Paapu, Constable
- Amit Tiwari as Prakash, Susheela's lover
- Amarasigamani as an ex-army man
- Bayilvan Ranganathan as factory worker's union leader
- Singamuthu as Muniyandi, Onaandi's friend
- Thambi Ramaiah as a flower seller
- Halwa Vasu as a drunkard
- Thideer Kannaiah
- Muthukaalai as Ayyanar's assistant
- Sabitha Anand as a cook
- S. N. Lakshmi as Lakshmi, an orphanage inmate
- King Kong
- Bonda Mani as Muniyandi's sidekick
- Vengal Rao as a drunkard
- Benjamin as a pedestrian
- Priyanka as a doctor

Cameo appearances

- T. K. S. Natarajan in the song "Yennadi Muniyamma"
- Shakeela in the song "Pappalapaappa"
- Antara Biswas in the song "Pappalapaappa"
- Suja Varunee in the song "Yennadi Muniyamma"

== Soundtrack ==
The music was composed by D. Imman. The audio launch was held on 30 June 2006 at AVM Studios.

Track listing
No.	Title	Lyrics	Singer(s)	Length
1.	"Yennadi Muniyamma"	T. K. S. Natarajan	Karthik, Blaaze, T. K. S. Natarajan	04:32
2.	"Engo Paarthirukiren"	Thabu Shankar	D. Imman	04:34
3.	"Thanjavooru Gopuramey"	Thabu Shankar	Karthik, Kalyani	04:12
4.	"Kaiya Veesamma"	Palani Bharathi	D. Imman, Joshna	04:27
5.	"Pappalapaappa"	Kalai Kumar	Anuradha Sriram	04:51
Total length:				22:36

== Release ==
Vathiyar was released on 11 November 2006. Shortly after release, an assistant director lodged a complaint with the Chennai police commissioner, stating that his story was stolen and made as Vathiyar. Arjun denied the accusations, saying the story was his own.

== Critical reception ==
S. R. Ashok Kumar of The Hindu wrote, "The story is by Arjun and director A. Venkatesh has neatly woven the script to make it enjoyable for the masses". TSV Hari of Rediff.com wrote "It is incredible that with two decent films Yei and Madarasi under his belt, director Venkatesh could not come up with something better. The songs of D. Imman are terrible. In a nutshell, the normally saleable star Arjun has torpedoed his future with this dud." Lajjavathi of Kalki wrote that to move the screenplay briskly, director Venkatesh seems to have overlooked logic; this would have been another Gentleman for Arjun had the director shown the elegance for the whole film like he did in flashback.

Malini Mannath of Chennai Online wrote, "'Vathiyar' is an amalgam of various films like 'Gentleman' and 'Muthalvan', incidentally, both were Arjun-starrers. But despite the sense of [deja vu], what keeps the story moving is the racy narration, Arjun's fight scenes and the Vadivelu track that provides some fun moments". Sify wrote, "Arjun has been doing the same formula action movies for the last two decades and still survives! The 40 plus actor is giving competition to our younger heroes! The secret of his success is that, the man sticks to the basics and delivers quite a kick with his actioners. For the Nth time, in Vathiyar, he once again re-heats his magic potion, which still seems to be working with B and C audiences".
