= Dil Bechara Pyaar Ka Maara =

- Poster
- Directed by: Onkar Nath Mishra
- Written by: Onkar Nath Mishra
- Starring: Vikas Kalantri; Aslam Khan; Aman Sondhi; Divya Palat; Jonita Doda; Rajpal Yadav; Mallika Kapoor
- Music by: Nikhil-Vinay
- Release date: 16 December 2004
- Country: India
- Language: Hindi

Dil Bechara Pyar Ka Maara is a Hindi film released in 2004, directed and written by Onkar Nath Mishra and starring Vikas Kalantri, Aslam Khan, Aman Sondhi, Divya Palat, Jonita Doda, Rajpal Yadav and Mallika Kapoor.

== Cast ==
- Vikas Kalantri as Deepak
- Aslam Khan as Sanjay
- Aman Sondhi as Vinod
- Divya Palat as Sherry
- Jonita Doda as Sunita
- Rajpal Yadav as Tunda Bhai
- Mallika Kapoor as Varsha
- Shehzad Khan as Hamid

== Soundtrack ==
#	Title	Singer(s)
1	"Bhago Bhago"	Sriram Ayyer
2	"Chudion Ne"	Shreya Ghoshal, Priya Bhattacharya, Shaswati Fukan
3	"Dil Bechara Pyaar Ka Maara"	Udit Narayan, Shreya Ghoshal
4	"Dil Bechara Pyaar Ka Maara (Male)"	Udit Narayan
5	"Hari Tum"	Priya Bhattacharya, Sriram Ayyer
6	"Jane Kya Asar Tera Hua"	Sonu Nigam, Shreya Ghoshal
7	"Jane Kya Asar Tera Hua (Female)"	Shreya Ghoshal
8	"Manava Tu"	Sriram Ayyer
9	"Masoom Sa Ek Chehra"	Arnab Chakravorty
10	"O Baby"	Sriram Ayyer
