= Anthony Yaar? =

- DVD cover of Anthony Yaar? and Uyire..
- Directed by: C. T. Pandi
- Produced by: C. Vijayakumar
- Starring: Shaam; Mallika Kapoor
- Cinematography: Santonio
- Edited by: Suresh Urs
- Music by: Dhina
- Production company: Annam Films International
- Release date: 31 July 2009
- Running time: 125 minutes
- Country: India
- Language: Tamil

Anthony Yaar? (transl. Who is Anthony?) (spelt Anthoni – Yaar? onscreen) is a 2009 Tamil language film directed by C. T. Pandi. The film stars Shaam and Mallika Kapoor, while Lal, Vivek, and Rajesh play supporting roles. The music was composed by Dhina, and the film was released on 31 July 2009.

== Plot ==
Anthony (Shaam) is an orphan who grows up in a church situated in a coastal village near Tuticorin. The local priest (Rajesh) is his benefactor. Anthony is loving and caring towards the local fishermen and their families who are being exploited by the rowdy Michael.

== Cast ==
- Shaam as Anthony
- Mallika Kapoor as Manju
- Lal as Michael
- Vivek as Kingfisher
- Rajesh as a priest
- Pragathi as Manju's sister-in-law
- Prem Sankar as Manju's brother
- Meenal as Meena
- Vennira Aadai Moorthy as Kumar
- Cell Murugan as Meena's brother

== Production ==
During the development stages of the film, when the cast was being decided, Shaam went to visit actor Vadivelu to enquire about his availability and to sign him on to play a role in the film. Vadivelu refused to be a part of the film and subsequently verbally insulted Shaam, prompting the actor to lodge a complaint with the Nadigar Sangam about Vadivelu's conduct. The film was shot in Tuticorin. Shaam plays a fisherman in the film.

== Music ==
Soundtrack was composed by Dhina, with lyrics written by Palani Bharathi, Yugabharathi, Snehan and Kirithiya.

No.	Song	Singers	Lyrics
1	"Kai Thattamal"	Mahathi	Palani Bharathi
2	"Kanaa Ondru Kandaen"	Bombay Jayashree, Shankar Mahadevan	Snehan
3	"Kattu Marathila"	Tippu	Yugabharathi
4	"Malakotta Kannu"	Silambarasan, Anuradha Sriram	Yugabharathi
5	"Mani Osai Ketkalayo"	Chinmayi, Dhina	Kirithiya
6	"Yamma Yamma"	Sabesh	Yugabharathi

== Critical reception ==
A critic from The New Indian Express wrote that "A cliched sequence of events and amateur handling of the screenplay take away all the sheen in Anthony Yaar". A critic from Rediff opined that the film is "a throwback to the worst commercial potboilers of the 80s when the hero cult was in full swing, and very little made sense on celluloid". A critic from Dinamalar praised the bold attempt of the director, the music, and the cinematography. A critic from Sify wrote, "Shaam shows off his six-pack body, Mallika has hardly anything to do while Lal hams. The music is bad. Vivek's comedy track as Kingfisher is the only entertainment in the film, though he too is fast becoming repetitive. There is nothing here to recommend, and is total waste of time".
