= Hushaar =

2009 Indian Kannada-language film

- Directed by: S Adarsh
- Produced by: T Amaranath Hegde
- Starring: Adarsh; Mallika Kapoor
- Cinematography: Ramesh Appi
- Edited by: K M Prakash
- Music by: S Adarsh
- Release date: 4 September 2009
- Country: India
- Language: Kannada

Hushaar is a 2009 Indian Kannada-language film directed by S Adarsh, starring Adarsh and Mallika Kapoor in lead roles.

== Cast ==
- Adarsha as Vishwas
- Mallika Kapoor as Akshatha
- Master Anand
- Vikram Udaykumar
- Mohan Raj
- Jayasheela

== Music ==
Hushaar

Soundtrack album by S Adarsh
- Released: 2009
- Recorded: 2009
- Genre: Feature film soundtrack
- Length: 7:38
- Language: Kannada

Official audio
- Hushaar- Full Album on YouTube

Track listing
| No. | Title | Singer(s) | Length |
|---|---|---|---|
| 1. | "Ninna Kandare" | K. S. Chithra | 3:10 |
| 2. | "Artha Madkolo" | Akanksha Badami | 4:28 |
| Total length: | | | 7:38 |

== Reception ==
=== Critical response ===
R G Vijayasarathy of Rediff.com scored the film at 2 out of 5 stars and says "Adarsha has done a better job in the second half as an actor. Mumbai import Mallika Kapoor should be given a crash course in acting immediately. No amount of make-up can cover up an expressionless face. Anand is a good actor, but he is handicapped by uninspiring comedy sequences. Hushaar could have made a greater impact as a suspense thriller if not for the comedy". A critic from The Times of India scored the film at 2.5 out of 5 stars and wrote "Aadarsha excels as hero and music director. Mallika Kapoor fails to impress. Master Anand's performance as the hero's friend is amateurish. Aadarsha's music is good". A critic from Mid-Day wrote "Aadarsh has done a good job as an actor and director and Mallika charms the audience with her simplistic beauty and acting. Anand*s comedy adds the fun element to the script. Director Aadarsh*s script is praiseworthy, but his cinematography drags like a tele-serial. Thriller and comedy are the highlights of the film. Music is not worth a mention at all and the camerawork needs a lot of improvement. You could watch the movie atleast [sic] once" Manju Shettar from The New Indian Express wrote "Meanwhile, a group of youngsters get killed in peculiar circumstances. The climax is how Viswas succeeds in arresting the culprit behind the killings. Had Adarsha selected a few experienced artistes, the film would have been a lot better".
