= Kuch Naa Kaho =

- Theatrical release poster
- Directed by: Rohan Sippy
- Screenplay by: Neeraj Vora
- Dialogues by: Naushil Mehta Nidhi Tuli
- Story by: Rohena Gera
- Produced by: Ramesh Sippy
- Starring: Aishwarya Rai; Abhishek Bachchan; Arbaaz Khan
- Cinematography: V. Manikandan
- Edited by: Rajiv Gupta
- Music by: Songs: Shankar–Ehsaan–Loy; Background Score: Aadesh Shrivastava; Uday Mazumdar
- Distributed by: Ramesh Sippy Entertainment
- Release date: 26 August 2003
- Running time: 176 minutes
- Country: India
- Language: Hindi
- Budget: ₹8 crore
- Box office: ₹13.08 crore

Kuch Naa Kaho (Hindi: कुछ ना कहो, translation: Don't Say Anything) is a 2003 Indian Hindi-language romantic comedy-drama film directed by Rohan Sippy (in his directorial debut), starring Aishwarya Rai, Abhishek Bachchan and Arbaaz Khan. It was released on 26 August 2003. This title of the film is based on a song from the film 1942: A Love Story (1994).

== Plot ==
Raj (Abhishek Bachchan) is a happy and free-spirited Indian-American bachelor living with his mother (Suhasini Mulay) who visits his ancestral homeland in Mumbai, to attend his cousin Nikki's (Meghna Malik) wedding. Once in India, he finds himself pushed towards marriage by his overzealous uncle (Satish Shah). His uncle's employee, Namrata (Aishwarya Rai) chaperones Raj on a series of setups and dates, all of which he deliberately sabotages. During the wedding ceremonies, Raj discovers that he is falling for Namrata. After some deliberation, he decides to tell her, but to his surprise, he discovers she has a 7-year-old son, Aditya.

Raj is confused but forms a strong fatherly relationship with Aditya. Raj's uncle informs him that Namrata's husband disappeared right before Aditya's birth, and has never returned to his son or wife. Finding a letter that Raj had written confessing his feelings, Namrata gets upset thinking Raj tried to use her son to get close to her. She attempts to distance herself from him, but a stubborn Raj follows her to Aditya's boarding school, having promised the boy to pose as his father. On being prodded by Raj, she tells him that her husband Sanjeev left her for another woman whilst she was pregnant. Namrata and Raj begin to bond.

After some months, Raj decides to introduce Namrata to his mother. A short while later, he finds out that Sanjeev (Arbaaz Khan) has returned and is looking to reconcile with Namrata. Namrata is aghast and makes it clear that she does not want anything to do with him. Sanjeev refuses to leave, becoming stubborn and persistent, threatening her with a lawsuit for custody of Aditya. This puts Namrata on the path of reconciliation with Sanjeev.

After a chance meeting, Raj invites Sanjeev to his home for the wedding. Aditya is present and is affectionate with Raj, calling him "Dad." Sanjeev becomes jealous and angry, insulting Raj and his family. After witnessing Sanjeev's bad behaviour towards Raj, Namrata finally gets the courage to stand up to him. She publicly tells him off and also admits her feelings. Sanjeev is ashamed and disappears once again, warning Raj to not make the mistakes he made with his family.

== Cast ==
- Aishwarya Rai as Namrata
- Abhishek Bachchan as Raj Malhotra
- Arbaaz Khan as Sanjeev Kumar Srivastav, Namrata's husband
- Satish Shah as Rakesh Sharma, Raj's uncle
- Parth Dave as Aditya Kumar Srivastav / Aditya Raj Malhotra aka Adi, Namrata and Sanjeev's son
- Jaspal Bhatti as Monty Ahluwalia
- Suhasini Mulay as Dr. Spocks Malhotra, Raj's mother
- Himani Shivpuri as Minty Ahluwalia
- Razzak Khan as Singal Pasli, Bird Walker
- Divya Palat as Rachna Singh Gangwar
- Tannaz Irani as Ms. Loccolith Lobo
- Ramona Sunavala as Babeethaa
- Meghna Malik as Nikki Sharma, Rakesh's daughter
- Jennifer Winget as Pooja Sharma, Nikki's sister
- Yusuf Hussain as Roshanlal Sehgal
- Zoya Afroz as Aria Sharma, Pooja's sister
- Eijaz Khan as Vikram (special appearance)
- Gautami Kapoor as Poonam "Pony" (special appearance)
- Jasveer Kaur as Rani Malhotra (girl shown to Raj) and dancer in Baat meri suniye zara

== Soundtrack ==
Kuch Naa Kaho

Studio album by Shankar–Ehsaan–Loy
- Released: 4 August 2003 (India)
- Genre: Feature film soundtrack
- Label: Zee Music Company Saregama
- Producer: Shankar–Ehsaan–Loy

Shankar–Ehsaan–Loy chronology
Nayee Padosan (2003)	Kuch Naa Kaho (2003)	Kal Ho Naa Ho (2003)

The music was composed by Shankar–Ehsaan–Loy, with lyrics penned by Javed Akhtar. According to the Indian trade website Box Office India, with around 11,00,000 units sold, this film's soundtrack album was the year's thirteenth highest-selling.

=== Track listing ===
No.	Title	Lyrics	Singer(s)	Length
1.	"ABBG"	Javed Akhtar	Mahalakshmi Iyer, Udit Narayan
2.	"Achchi Lagti Ho"	Javed Akhtar	Kavita Krishnamurthy, Udit Narayan
3.	"Baat Meri Suniye To Zara"	Javed Akhtar	Mahalakshmi Iyer, Shankar Mahadevan
4.	"Kehti Hai Yeh Hawa"	Javed Akhtar	Richa Sharma, Shankar Mahadevan
5.	"Kuch Naa Kaho"	Javed Akhtar	Sadhana Sargam, Shaan
6.	"Tumhe Aaj Maine Jo Dekha"	Javed Akhtar	Shankar Mahadevan, Madhushree

== Box office ==
Kuch Naa Kaho collected ₹ 81,536,000, and despite a decent opening, it was declared a flop by Box Office India.
