= Angel John =

2009 Indian Malayalam-language film

- Directed by: S. L. Puram Jayasurya
- Written by: S. L. Puram Jayasurya; Manaf
- Produced by: K. K. Narayana Das
- Starring: Mohanlal; Shanthanu Bhagyaraj
- Cinematography: Ajayan Vincent; Lokanathan
- Edited by: Bijith Bala
- Music by: Ouseppachan
- Production company: Reels on Wheels
- Distributed by: Maxlaab Entertainments
- Release date: 22 October 2009
- Running time: 130 minutes
- Country: India
- Language: Malayalam

Angel John is a 2009 Indian Malayalam-language fantasy comedy film co-written and directed by S. L. Puram Jayasurya. It stars Mohanlal and Shanthanu Bhagyaraj (in his Malayalam film debut) in leading roles Nithya Menen, Lalu Alex, Vijayaraghavan, Jagathy Sreekumar and Salim Kumar in supporting roles. The music was composed by Ouseppachan.

== Plot ==
Maradonna is an aimless youngster who likes to waste his time doing practically nothing other than fooling around. For him everything in life is "Oru Rasam" (just fun). He likes to take the easy way out and lacks focus in his life. He is the only son of Joseph, a Banker and Mary, who dotes on him. The only person who has a soft corner for him is Sofia who is the daughter of a failed filmmaker, Kuruvilla.

Maradonna messes up his life by getting into company of friends and starting an internet café that fails after a group of goons destroys it and to recoup his losses, he tries to make ‘easy money’ by selling drugs. Soon he is conned and loses everything after pledging his house to a ‘blade’ moneylender Rajan. On hearing the news his father is hospitalised and his mother finally loses faith in him. A shattered Maradonna decides to commit suicide by jumping from a lighthouse into the sea. As he is about to jump, he is held back by a divine force in the form of Angel John, who offers him a new lease on life. Angel offers him two destinies, the first one is a life filled with good and bad events and the second one being a life with only happiness and he can live the way he want. Angel also predicts that Maradonna will die aged 66 if he chooses the first offer. If he goes for the second he will die aged 22. The drunken Maradona chooses the second one. The Angel fulfills his desires but the same desires will not be fulfilled again. But as his desires gets fulfilled his death will also be near. Not thinking about the consequences he takes the easy way which starts with Rs.5 lakh to getting his house back from Rajan.

When Khadar Moosa, an artist who performs life risking and dangerous performances tries to win a world record by holding breath underwater, he gets caught in a fishing net and nearly dies without getting out. Angel, knowing of this incident, tells Maradonna but tells him he will not save Moosa. Maradonna jumps into the water to save Moosa followed by Angel and gives back his life again. Followed by the incident there was a colony get together in which Moosa shares his real intention in record winning was that he wanted his wife Zeenath to come back and followed by Kuruvilla's film which a producer accepted as the script Sofia wrote (script idea by Angel).

Everyone was happy except Maradonna who is sad because he is going to die that day as told by Angel. Maradonna asks Angel "what will he do if it was Angel in his position?". To which Angel replies "He will go to the God's dearest children (meaning handicapped children). When Maradonna goes there he sees the persons who conned many children, Maradonna gets into a fight with one of them who was his friend Chandran. A twelve year old boy tries to stab Chandran but by mistake Maradonna gets stabbed as Angel said. When Angel and Maradonna (soul of Maradonna) goes to the roof Angel waits for God's grace and sends Maradonna (soul) back to his body. Angel explains to him why he is not taking Maradonna with him and departs. The next scene takes us to Maradonna, being an obedient boy who listens to his parents, while Angel comes to Rajan's house and saves him from committing suicide.

== Cast ==
- Mohanlal as Angel John
- Shanthanu Bhagyaraj as Maradonna Joseph (voiceover by Sarath Das)
- Jagathy Sreekumar as Khadar Moosa
- Lalu Alex as Joseph Kurushingal
- Nithya Menen as Sophia (voiceover by Sangeetha Sivan)
- Ambika as Mary Joseph
- Vijayaraghavan as James Kuruvilla
- Baiju as Mathai / M.A. Thai, a Karate Master
- Salim Kumar as Rajan, a Moneylender
- Prem Kumar as Babu, Fireman
- Bijukuttan as Sumesh, Khadar Moosa's Assistant
- Kollam Thulasi as Policeman
- Bineesh Bastin as goon
- Pradeep Chandran as Gangster
- Nandu Poduval as Shopkeeper
- Joju George as Bus Conductor
- Archived footage of Rajinikanth is used to show Angel John’s shape-shifting form.

== Soundtrack ==
The music was composed by Ouseppachan, with lyrics written by Ouseppachan, S. L. Puram Jayasurya, Manaf and Subhash Varma.

No.	Song	Singers	Lyrics	Length (m:ss)
1	"Makane"	Franco, Rajesh Vijay	Ouseppachan, S. L. Puram Jayasurya, Manaf	
2	"Thirakkumbol"	Franco, Hariharan	Subhash Varma	

== Reception ==
A critic from Sify praised Mohanlal's performance and noted the film's effective blend of sentiment, comedy, and action. A critic from Rediff.com gave two out of five stars, panning the film's lack of originality and subpar performances. A critic from Deccan Herald opined that "Director and writer S L Puram Jayasurya, in his second venture, seems to have churned out a fable for teeny-boppers. It also reminds us of the spiritual theme: Do good to others, then God’s angel will come to you".
