= Aavide Syamala =

1999 Telugu film by Kodi Ramakrishna

- VCD cover
- Directed by: Kodi Ramakrishna
- Screenplay by: Kodi Ramakrishna; Srinivasa Chakravarthy
- Story by: Sreenivasan
- Produced by: R. Sitarama Raju
- Starring: Prakash Raj; Ramya Krishna
- Cinematography: Shankar Kanteti
- Music by: Madhavapeddi Suresh
- Production company: Pavanaputra Productions
- Release date: 24 December 1999
- Country: India
- Language: Telugu

Aavide Syamala (transl. She’s the Syamala) is a 1999 Indian Telugu-language drama film directed by Kodi Ramakrishna. The film stars Prakash Raj and Ramya Krishna in the lead roles. It is a remake of the 1998 Malayalam film Chinthavishtayaya Shyamala. The music for the film was composed by Madhavapeddi Suresh. Upon release, Aavide Syamala received mixed reviews, with praise for Ramya Krishna's performance but criticism for its narrative.

== Plot ==
Prakash, a school teacher and habitual daydreamer, aspires to become wealthy through easy and unrealistic means. Prakash’s father arranges his marriage to Syamala, a kind-hearted woman from a modest background with a widowed mother and a younger sister.

The story shifts to Syamala’s daily struggles as she juggles managing household finances, raising their school-going daughter, and dealing with persistent creditors. She repeatedly assures them that Prakash will return with money soon. Meanwhile, Prakash, in Hyderabad, tries to impress influential people with business ideas but faces rejection due to a lack of funds. Defeated, he returns home after selling Syamala's jewelry. Despite his shortcomings, Syamala remains patient and supportive, even as his father scolds Prakash for his failures.

Prakash devises new schemes, including organizing a lottery and taking an Ayyappa Deeksha to avoid creditors. Syamala eventually uncovers his deceit and insists he removes the sacred mala. Later, Prakash spots a gas factory he wants to lease for ₹2 lakh and persuades Syamala to ask her mother for the funds. When she refuses, he abandons Syamala and their daughter, leaving a cassette message stating they must fend for themselves. Determined, Syamala takes up tailoring and odd jobs to repay Prakash’s debts and rebuild her life.

Prakash, meanwhile, tries to enter politics but fails miserably. Eventually, a dejected and remorseful Prakash returns home. However, Syamala, having lost all faith in him, rejects his attempts to reconcile. Desperate, he pleads for her trust, declaring his sincerity even in death. Moved by his words, Syamala's emotions ultimately compel her to forgive him. The film concludes with the family's reunion and Prakasa Rao resuming his duties as a school teacher.

== Cast ==
- Prakash Raj as Prakash
- Ramya Krishna as Syamala
- Tanikella Bharani
- M. S. Narayana
- Ali
- Gundu Hanumantha Rao
- Suttivelu as Prakasa Rao's father
- Mallikarjuna Rao
- S. K. Basheer
- Alphonsa
- Dubbing Janaki
- Baby Keerthana
- Gadiraaju Subbarao
- Prahlada Raju
- Damu
- Rammurthy
- Rajitha

== Production ==
The film was shot at the Ramanaidu Studios in Nanakramguda.

== Music ==
The soundtrack for the film was composed by Madhavapeddi Suresh, with lyrics by Sirivennela Seetharama Sastry, Vennelakanti, Jonnavittula, Sahithi, and D. Narayana Varma.

Track list
No.	Title	Lyrics	Singer(s)	Length
1.	"Omkara Roopana"	D. Narayana Varma	K. J. Yesudas
2.	"Adola Unnaremandi"	Jonnavittula	Chitra
3.	"Abbo Kotha Avakaya"	Sahithi	Nagoor Babu, Radhika
4.	"O Gamyamunna Charanam"	Sirivennela Seetharama Sastry	S. P. Balasubrahmanyam (Chorus)
5.	"Ding Dong Ding Dong"	Vennelakanti	S. P. Balasubrahmanyam

== Reception ==
Sri of Telugucinema.com reviewed Aavide Syamala as a socially themed film, but criticized its flat treatment, lacklustre performances, and overall uninspiring execution, describing it as a "big drag" suited mainly for a female audience. Jeevi of Idlebrain.com rated the film two on a scale of five.

A critic for Andhra Today noted, "The message that could have been given in a few scenes is stretched into a full-length movie. There is hardly any novelty or uniqueness in the presentation. Creditable performances by Prakash Raj and Ramya Krishna alone keep the movie going and cover up its myriad flaws."

Griddaluru Gopala Rao of Zamin Ryot gave the film a positive review, particularly praising the title character Syamala and Ramya Krishna's performance, noting it as a memorable role in her career.
