= Pallikkoodam (film) =

- Directed by: Thankar Bachan
- Based on: Kalavadiya Pozhudhugal by Thankar Bachan
- Produced by: Viswas Sundar
- Starring: Sneha; Narain; Thangar Bachchan; Sriya Reddy; Seeman
- Cinematography: Thangar Bachan
- Edited by: S. Sathish
- Music by: Bharadwaj
- Production company: Vishwas films
- Release date: 10 August 2007
- Country: India
- Language: Tamil

Pallikkoodam (transl. School) is a 2007 Indian Tamil language film written, directed and cinematographed by Thankar Bachan.The film stars Sneha, Narain, Sriya Reddy, Seeman and the director himself. It deals with four different periods – 1978, 1983, 1991 and 2004.

== Plot ==
The movie revolves around an ailing school in a village in Cuddalore district where the land owner wants to demolish the school while the old students prevent the school from getting shut. Kokila (Sneha) works in the school where she had also studied. The school was constructed by Kokila's grandfather years ago and dispute arises between her family members, where her uncle wanted to demolish the school and sell the land as the school is in a very bad state.

The school teachers come up with a plan of organising an alumni get together, so that the school can be saved. Kumarasamy aka Kumar (Thagar Bachan) is a poor man who lives in the same village and is the classmate of Kokila. He is sent to Kanchipuram to meet the district collector Vetrivel (Narain) who also happens to be the alumni of the same school. Vetri and Kumar were close friends during childhood and both feel happy meeting after years. Meanwhile, the two also get to meet Muthu (Seeman) who is a film director now and is also their close friend. All the three friends get united after many years.

A flashback is shown where Vetri, Kumar and Muthu were close friends during schooldays. All three belong to poor families and Vetri falls in love with his classmate Kokila, who is a rich girl. Jency (Shriya) is a nurse who visits the village for conducting a medical camp. All three boys get closer to Jhansi as she is kind and she looks after them very well. Jency takes care of Muthu's education after his father's sudden death.

Meanwhile, Vetri and Kokila's love affair is known to her family members and they accuse that Jency helped the love and insults her in front of the villagers. Jency gets hurt and leaves the village. Muthu also leaves the village along with her . Vetri goes out of village for undergraduation. Vetri clears civil services and comes back to village with plans of marrying Kokila in a registrar office. But Kokila refuses getting married without her family's consent and requests Vetri to meet her parents once with the hope that they would agree as he is well educated now. But, Kokila's father beat Vetri and his father and in the fight, Vetri's father dies. Kokila's family members lock her in a room. Vetri gets furious that Kokila didn't turn up at the time of his visit and also worries due to his father's death. Vetri decides to leave the village with no plans of returning again.

Coming back to present, all three friends meet and share their old good memories. Muthu is married and he takes care of Jency still. Also Kumar is married. Kumar describes the pathetic state of their old school in village and requests them to take some action to prevent it from getting shut. The friends decides to try all means to conduct an alumni reunion. But Vetri is not interested to return to the village as he has been humiliated by Kokila's family members long time ago. Kumar and Muthu convince Vetri to come to village. Kokila still loves Vetri but Kumar lies to Kokila that Vetri is married which makes Kokila angry. Kokila feels that Vetri has ditched her and started a new life while she still loves him.

An event has been organised to celebrate the 75th year of the school by inviting all the alumni. Vetri and Muthu are invited as special guests as that would make the event more popular. Vetri and Muthu arrive at the village and visit their school. Vetri and Kokila do not talk to each other. The event is organised in a grand manner and this attracts the media attention also. But still the land owner wants to demolish the school. Vetri files a case on behalf of the school against Kokila's uncle and gets the verdict in favour of the school. The event successfully happens and everyone feels happy that the school is saved as many alumni donate for renovation works.

Now Kumar informs the truth that Vetri is not yet married and he just lied so that Kokila will forget him and make her mind for marrying someone else. Kokila understands Vetri's love meanwhile Vetri also understands that Kokila was helpless and was locked up by her family members while Vetri was beaten. Vetri and Kokila get united at last. Kumar rejects Muthu offering him money since he feels that this habit will occur and it will split their friendship, He vows that his son will be educated in the school and become a successful person. After the event, Kumar goes to his school and sits in class at his spot, to which triggers a memory from his school days where he got scolding from his teacher for sleeping.

== Cast ==
- Sneha as Kokila
  - Shreya Gupto as child Kokila
- Narain as Vetrivel
- Thankar Bachchan as Kumarasamy
- Sriya Reddy as Jency
- Seeman as Muthuvel
- Meenal as Vasantha
- V. Sekhar as Educational officer
- Nagineedu as Kokila's Uncle

== Production ==
The film was launched in August 2004 with Madhavan and Cheran in leading roles. They later opted out of the project. Gautham Vasudev Menon's disinterest in working as an actor prompted Thangar Bachan to sign on Seeman to play a role in the film.

== Soundtrack ==
The music was composed by Bharadwaj.

| Song | Singers | Lyrics |
|---|---|---|
| "Meendum Pallikku" | Bharadwaj | Snehan |
| "Indha Nimidam" | Srinivas, Janani Bharadwaj | Na. Muthukumar |
| "Kaadu Padhungurome" | Ramji Isai Mazhalai | Viveka |
| "9 Manikku 9 Manikku" | Ramji Isai Mazhalai | Viveka |
| "Manasu Marugudhe" | Subiksha, Narayanan | Thenmozhi |
| "Rose Mary" | Gaana Ulaganathan, Surmukhi Raman | Gaana Ulaganathan |

== Accolades ==
Thangar Bachan won the Tamil Nadu State Film Award for Best Director.

== Critical reception ==
Rajaneesh Vilakudy of Rediff.com wrote, "while Pallikkoodam lacks the class of Azhagi, you can at least return home with memories of your school life." Nidarsana of Kalki praised the acting of star cast, Bharadwaj's music, climax and cinematography and concluded despite flaws here and there, one can appreciate Thangar for giving an realistic film. Malini Mannath of Chennai Online wrote, "The movie is a concept that had the potential to but didn't quite transform into a celluloid classic".
