= February 14 (film) =

- Poster
- Directed by: S. P. Hosimin
- Written by: S. P. Hosimin
- Produced by: Salem Chandrasekharan
- Starring: Bharath; Renuka Menon
- Cinematography: R. Rathnavelu
- Edited by: Suresh Urs
- Music by: Bharadwaj
- Production company: Sri Saravanaa Creations
- Release date: 22 July 2005
- Running time: 140 minutes
- Country: India
- Language: Tamil

February 14 is a 2005 Indian Tamil-language romantic comedy film directed by debutant S. P. Hosimin. Produced by Salem Chandrasekharan, the film stars Bharath and Renuka Menon, with the music composed by Bharadwaj.

== Plot ==
Shiva enrolls in St. Peters college, Bangalore and meets Pooja, who was born and brought up in the United States and has come to India to stay with her grandparents while completing her college education. Shiva falls in love with her but soon realises that their characters are totally different. Pooja feels alone, and she wants to return to the US. So Shiva thinks about a plan to get her to stay and he expresses his love to her by creating a fictitious character Mr. X but never reveals the identity of the character till the end. Pooja who got impressed by Mr. X refuses to see him in the later stage but understand and accepts Shiva's true love.

== Cast ==
- Bharath as Shiva / Mr. X
- Renuka Menon as Pooja
- Vadivelu as Ezhumalai, Canteen owner
- Sathyan as Arvind Swamy
- Santhanam as College Student
- Suman Setty as Suman
- Pyramid Natarajan as Pooja's grandfather
- Raviprakash as Shiva's father
- Chithra Kumar as Shiva's mother
- Ajmal Ameer as Vicky, college student
- Mayilsamy as Himself
- Halwa Vasu as Canteen employee
- Bonda Mani as Canteen employee
- Vijay Ganesh as Canteen employee
- Vengal Rao as Canteen employee (credited as Rao)
- Jennifer as Gayathri, Shiva's sister
- Ragasya as Special appearance in "Othayya Rettaya"

== Soundtrack ==
The music was composed by Bharadwaj.

Song	Singers	Lyrics
"Laila Majnu"	Karthik, Sadhana Sargam	Na. Muthukumar
"Aantha Avasthai"	Shreya Ghoshal	Kabilan
"Nanba Nanba"	Bharadwaj, Karthik, Srinivas, Janani Bharadwaj	Pa. Vijay
"Un Peyarennada"	Anuradha Sriram	S. P. Hosimin
"Idhu Kathala"	Haricharan	S. P. Hosimin
"Ennachu Enakku"	Shri Krishna	S. P. Hosimin
"Othayya Rettaya"	Pushpavanam Kuppusamy, Anuradha Sriram	S. P. Hosimin
"Jana Gana"	Arjun Thomas, Donnan, Andrea	S. P. Hosimin

== Critical reception ==
Malini Mannath of Chennai Online wrote, "The director's half-hearted attempts at lacing his narration with comedy scenes proves futile, their not quite fitting into his narration. Where he scores is in his song picturisation. The dance numbers are attractively shot, canned by Ratnavelu's camera, which throughout gives a rich glossy look to the frames". Visual Dasan of Kalki found Rathnavelu's cinematography as the film's only positive. Malathi Rangarajan of The Hindu wrote, "A handsome hero, heroine who looks mature, excellent camera work, melodious music, crisp dialogue and effective direction all fall flat in the absence of a matching screenplay".
