= Vallamai Tharayo =

- Theatrical release poster
- Directed by: Madhumitha
- Written by: Madhumitha
- Produced by: Nalini SundarRaman; Trisakti SundarRaman
- Starring: R. Parthiban; Chaya Singh
- Music by: Bharadwaj
- Production company: Giriguja International
- Release date: 28 June 2008
- Running time: 146 minutes
- Country: India
- Language: Tamil

Vallamai Tharayo (transl. Give me the strength) is a 2008 Indian Tamil language romantic drama film written and directed by Madhumitha in her debut. The film stars R. Parthiban and Chaya Singh, with Karunas and Anand Raj in supporting roles and Srikanth in a guest appearance. The story explores the situation of a girl who is forced into a marriage with a man whom she barely knows and has no intention of getting to know. The music was composed by Bharadwaj, and the film was released on 28 June 2008, and ran for over 100 days in theatres. It won the Tamil Nadu State Film Award for Best Family Film.

== Plot ==
The film opens with Nandita and her husband Anand in the process of getting a divorce. Nandita's lawyer accuses Anand of physically abusing Nandita, calling him a sadist.

A flashback takes the audience back to the circumstances of their marriage. A happy working girl from the city, Nandita returns to her home village for a family function, only to find that her father Veerasamy has decided to marry Nandita off elsewhere. Nandita, who has spent her life falling in love with Sekar, her cousin and original fiancé, cannot agree to this sudden marriage. However, her father forces her to agree, and the marriage to Anand takes place. The newlyweds move back to the city, and though the kind and jovial Anand attempts to lead a life with her and make her fall in love with him, Nandita does not budge. She is normally cold and impolite, except for when she sees constant reminders of Sekar.

The scene cuts back to the family court, where Nandita has gotten the divorce and calls Anand for a final farewell, telling him to find a girl whom he will truly love. Now Nandita is a free woman, living life the way she wants to and dreaming of seeing Sekar again. She moves to a new apartment, gets a new job, and a new friend – her housekeeper Savithri. Things are going well, but Anand is a constant unwanted presence in her life, greeting her every morning and calling her frequently. When asked why he is still around, he tells her that he likes no one else but her.

On Valentine's Day, Nandita sees Sekar on TV, talking about her as his soulmate, his first love. To her surprise, he announces that he is getting married soon because she is already married. An upset Nandita is pushed even further over the edge when she finds out that Savithri has been talking to Anand about Nandita. She leaves on a company business trip for a few days; a visit to a school for disabled children. Learning a few life lessons, Nandita comes back a changed woman and becomes open to getting to know Anand for the first time.

The end of the film shows Nandita and Anand happily spending time with each other.

== Cast ==
- Parthiban as Anand
- Chaya Singh as Nandita
- Karunas as Driving School Master
- Anand Raj as Veerasamy (Nandita's father)
- Kuyili as Lakshmi (Nandita's mother)
- Rajyalakshmi as Padmavathi (Anand's mother)
- Devipriya as Savithri
- Chaams as Nandita's boss
- Sethu Vinayagam as Advocate Sathyamurthy
- Bombay Gnanam as Judge
- R. S. Shivaji as a frustrated man at the elevator
- A. K. Veerasamy as himself
- Apeksha Bhatt as Anand's boss
- Chitra as Nandita's aunt
- Dindukkal Hamsa as Nandita's grandmother
- Sevvazhai as Nandita's uncle
- Rani as Sekhar's mother
- Srikanth as Sekar (guest appearance)

== Soundtrack ==
Soundtrack was composed by Bharadwaj. The audio was launched in April 2008 at Rani Meiyammai Hall.

Song	Singers	Lyrics
"Mangalam Pongidum"	S. P. Balasubrahmanyam, Janani Bharadwaj	Kamakodiyan
"Kolattam"	Janani Bharadwaj, Bharadwaj, Jaya	Aanadal Priyadarshini
"Aayiram Vaanavil"	Chinmayi	Aanadal Priyadarshini
"Unnaithan (Lady)"	Anuradha Sriram	Pa. Vijay
"Unnaithan (Men)"	Bharadwaj	Pa. Vijay
"Megangal Illamal"	Bharadwaj	Pa. Vijay
"En Veetil"	Srinivas, Jaya	Snehan
"Vallami Tharayo"	Surmukhi Raman, Bharadwaj	Kamakodiyan

== Reception ==
=== Critical reception ===
Sify wrote "Unfortunately Madhumita has flunked, as she has made her own version of the Mani Ratnam classic Mounaragam from a feminist point of view. The film is weak in narration and execution". Pavithra Srinivasan of Rediff.com wrote "What lets the movie down is a shaky script. Heavily inspired by Mani Rathnam's Mouna Raagam, the director has obviously tried a hand at explaining every thought and emotion, and failed miserably." The Hindu wrote "The first scene is powerful and makes you sit up for a riveting story. Sadly the fizz dies down soon. More like Mouna Ragam rehashed, Vallamai Thaaraayo does have its high moments — but they are few and far between."

=== Accolades ===
The film won the Tamil Nadu State Film Award for Best Family Film.
