= Mallika Kapoor =

Indian actress

- Born: Delhi, India
- Occupations: Actress, model
- Years active: 2004–2011

Mallika Kapoor is an Indian former actress, working in the South Indian film industries mainly in Malayalam, Tamil and Kannada. She has also appeared in a few Telugu and Hindi films.

== Career ==
She started her film career through her debut Malayalam film Albudhadweep, alongside actor Prithviraj Sukumaran. Her Tamil debut was the leading role in Azhagai Irukkirai Bayamai Irukkirathu, alongside Bharath, and then subsequently in Vathiyar with Arjun. Her appearance Allare Allari, opposite Allari Naresh, was her first in Telugu. She has returned to the Malayalam scene in 2008 with Madambi.

She has two additional Tamil films to date: Arputha Theevu (dubbed from Malayalam), which was released in September 2006, and Vathiyar, which was released on Diwali.

== Filmography ==
Year	Film	Role	Language	Other notes
2004	Dil Bechaara Pyar Ka Maara	Neela	Hindi	
2005	Albhutha Dweep	Rajkumari Radha	Malayalam	
2006	Azhagai Irukkirai Bayamai Irukkirathu	Jyothilaxmi	Tamil	
2006	Vathiyar	Anjali	Tamil	
2007	Savi Savi Nenapu	Preethi	Kannada	
2007	Allare Allari	Priya	Telugu	
2007	Puli Varudhu	Gayathri / Shenbagam	Tamil	
2008	State Rowdy	Priya	Telugu	
2008	Ganga Kaveri	Kaveri	Kannada	
2008	Madambi	Shyamala	Malayalam	
2009	Anthony Yaar?	Manju	Tamil	
2009	Jack and Jill	Gayathri	Malayalam	
2009	Solla Solla Inikkum	Anuradha	Tamil	
2009	Hushaar	Akshatha	Kannada	
2010	Theeradha Vilaiyattu Pillai	Interviewer	Tamil	Cameo appearance
2010	Advocate Lakshmanan – Ladies Only	Annie	Malayalam	
2010	The Thriller	Meghna	Malayalam	Cameo appearance
2011	Mungarina Modala Hani		Kannada	
2011	Gun	Malliga	Kannada	
2011	Makaramanju	Vasundhara	Malayalam	
