= Thankar Bachan =

Tamil Indian director, actor, cinematographer and novelist (born 1961)

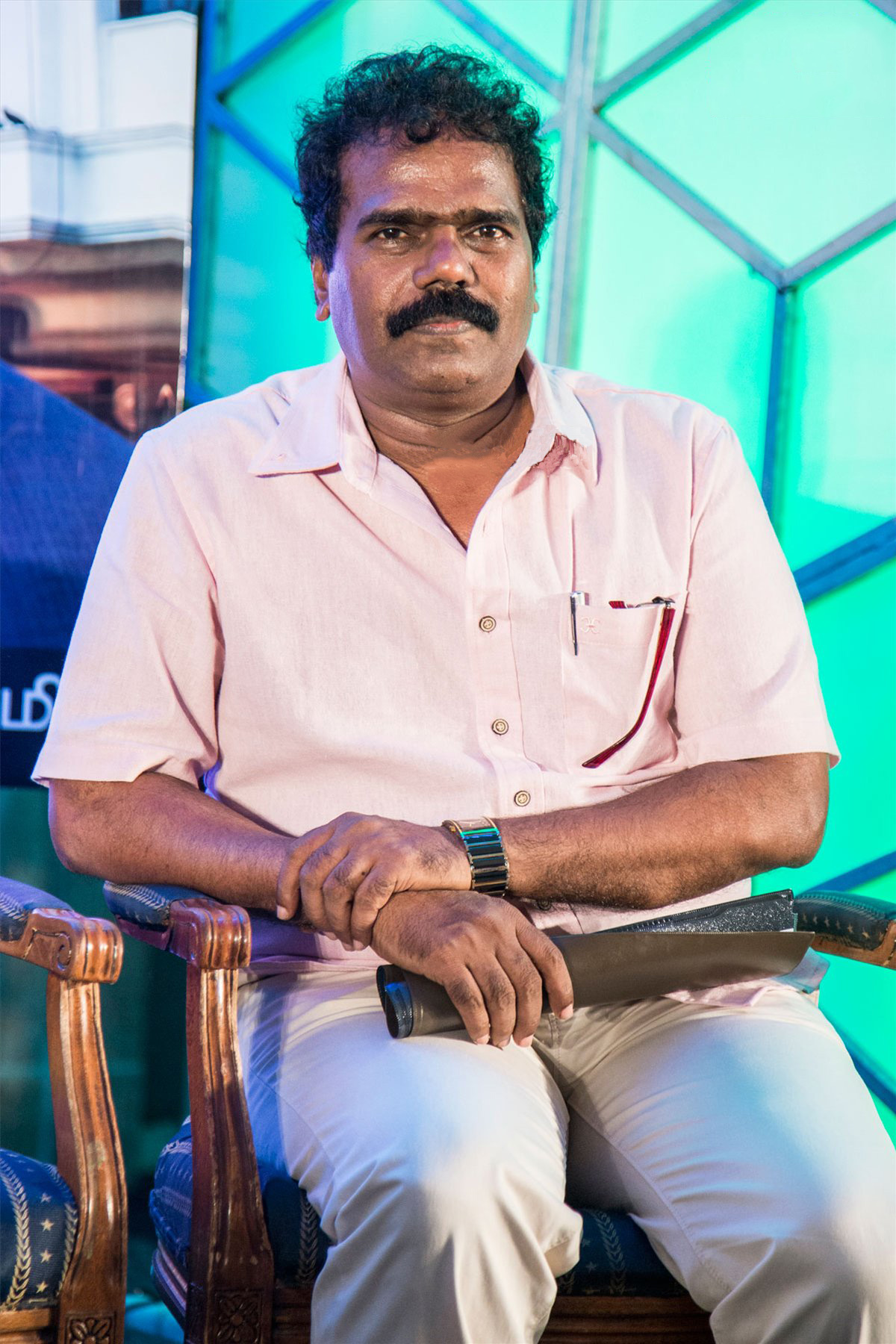
- Bachan in 2016
- Born: Thangaraj; 5 May 1961 (age 65); Pathirakottai, South Arcot District (now Cuddalore), Tamil Nadu, India
- Occupations: Cinematographer; director; actor; producer; novelist
- Years active: 1990–present

Thankar Bachan, alternatively Thangar Bachan, is an Indian film director and actor, cinematographer and novelist. He has served as a jury member in the National Film Awards.

== Early life ==
Thankar Bachan was born 5 May 1961 in Pathirakottai, a village near Panruti, Cuddalore district, Tamil Nadu.

== Career ==
Bachan started his career as a cinematographer in his debut film Malai Charal. He was known for his work in Mogamul and Bharathi. He made his directorial debut in Azhagi.

Apart from his work in films, he occasionally wrote literary works. His novels include Onbathu Roobai Nottu and Ammavin Kai Pesi, both of which he later adapted into films that he directed himself.

Thangar Bachan was known for his contribution in portraying North Tamil Nadu villages, which were not depicted in Tamil cinema properly. His story plots were set mostly in Panruti and surrounding villages. After Bharathiraja, villages were best portrayed in Thangar Bachan movies. Bharathiraja himself declared that after him Bachan directs the best village films.

He was the Pattali Makkal Katchi candidate for the Cuddalore Lok Sabha constituency in the 2024 Indian general election, in which he came in third place and lost.

== Filmography ==
=== As director ===
Year	Title	Notes
2002	Azhagi	
2002	Solla Marandha Kadhai	
2004	Thendral	
2005	Chidambarathil Oru Appasamy	Also producer
2007	Pallikkoodam	Tamil Nadu State Film Award for Best Director
2007	Onbadhu Roobai Nottu	
2012	Ammavin Kaipesi	Also producer
2017	Kalavaadiya Pozhuthugal	
2023	Karumegangal Kalaigindrana	

=== As cinematographer only ===
Year	Title	Notes
1990	Malai Charal	
1992	Madhumathi	
1993	Dharma Seelan	
1993	Rajadhi Raja Raja Kulothunga Raja Marthanda Raja Gambeera Kathavaraya Krishna Kamarajan	
1994	Malappuram Haji Mahanaya Joji	Malayalam film
1995	Veettai Paaru Naattai Paaru	
1996	Vaanmathi	
1996	Vaazhga Jananayagam	
1996	Karuvelam Pookkal	
1996	Kadhal Kottai	
1997	Kaalamellam Kadhal Vaazhga	
1998	Kaadhale Nimmadhi	
1998	Sirf Tum	Hindi film
1998	Marumalarchi	
1999	Kannedhirey Thondrinal	
1999	Kanave Kalaiyadhe	
1999	Kallazhagar	
1999	Unnudan	
2000	Bharathi	
2000	Kannukku Kannaga	
2000	James Pandu	
2001	Kutti	
2001	Pandavar Bhoomi	
2007	Periyar	

=== As actor ===
Year	Title	Role	Notes
2005	Chidambarathil Oru Appasamy	Elangovan	
2007	Pallikkoodam	Kumarasamy	
2012	Ammavin Kaipesi	Prasad	
2018	Merlin		
2023	Karumegangal Kalaigindrana	Public prosecutor	Cameo appearance

=== As presenter ===
- Peranbum Perungobamum (2025)

== Bibliography ==
=== Novels ===
- Onbathu Roobai Nottu novel, 1996.
- Ammavin Kai Pesi, 2009

=== Short story collections ===
- Vellai Maadu, 1993
- Kodi Munthiri, 2002
- Isaikaatha Isaithattu, 2006
- Thangar Bachan Kathaigal
- Solla Thonuthu- A collection of 50 articles published in Tamil Hindu daily news paper- 2015

== Awards ==
- 1993 – Lilli Deivasigamani Memorial Award for Best Short Story Collection (Vellai Maadu)
- 1996 – Tamil Nadu Government's Award for Best Novel (Onbathu Rubai Nottu)
- 1996 – Agni Akshara Award for Best Novel (Onbathu Rubai Nottu)
- 1996 – Thiruppur Tamil Sangam Award for Best Novel (Onbathu Rubai Nottu)
- 1997 – Tamil Nadu State Film Award for Best Cinematographer (Film – Kaalamellam Kadhal Vazhga)
- 1999 – "Kalaimamani" Award – awarded by the Government of Tamil Nadu for Contributions in Tamil cinema
- 2002 – GV SICA Award for Best Director (Film – Azhagi)
- 2005 – Jaya TV Award for Best Actor (Film – Chidambarathil Oru Appasamy)
- 2007 – Tamil Nadu State Raja Sando Award for Contribution in Film direction
- 2007 – Santhome Communication Award for Best Director (Film – Onbadhu Roobai Nottu)
- 2007 – Sathyan Memorial Film Award for Best Director (Tamil) (Film – Pallikoodam)
- 2007 – GV SICA Award for Best Story Dialogues (Film – Pallikoodamm)
- 2007 – Tamil Nadu State Film Award for Best Director for Pallikoodamm)
- 2015 – S. P. Adithanar Literary Award for "Thankar Bachan Kathaigal" - A Short Story Collection.
