= Gemini (2002 film) =

2002 Tamil film directed by Saran

- Poster
- Directed by: Saran
- Written by: Saran
- Produced by: B. Gurunath; M. Balasubramanian; M. Saravanan; M. S. Guhan
- Starring: Vikram; Kiran Rathod; Kalabhavan Mani
- Cinematography: Venkatesh Anguraj
- Edited by: Suresh Urs
- Music by: Bharadwaj
- Production company: AVM Productions
- Distributed by: Royal Film Company
- Release date: 12 April 2002 (India)
- Running time: 157 minutes
- Country: India
- Language: Tamil

Gemini (/dʒɛminɪ/) is a 2002 Indian Tamil-language crime action film written and directed by Saran, Produced by AVM Productions, the film stars Vikram in the main lead role, while Kiran Rathod, Kalabhavan Mani, Murali, Vinu Chakravarthy, Manorama and Thennavan portray significant roles. Based on gang wars in Chennai, the film delves into the lives of outlaws and the roles the police and society play in their rehabilitation.

In early 2001, rival gangsters "Vellai" Ravi and Chera reformed themselves with the patronage of a police officer. Saran was inspired by this incident and scripted a story based on it. Production began shortly afterwards in December the same year and was completed by March 2002. The film was shot mainly at the AVM Studios in Chennai, while two song sequences were filmed in Switzerland. The film had cinematography by A. Venkatesh and editing by Suresh Urs while the soundtrack was scored by Bharadwaj.

The soundtrack was well received, with the song "O Podu" becoming a sensation in Tamil Nadu. Gemini was released two days ahead of the Tamil New Year on 12 April 2002 and received mixed reviews, with praise for the performances of Vikram and Mani but criticism of Saran's script. Made at an estimated cost of ₹40 million (US$430,000), the film earned more than ₹200 million (US$2.1 million) at the box office and became one of the highest-grossing Tamil film of the year. Its success, largely attributed to the popularity of "O Podu", resurrected the Tamil film industry, which was experiencing difficulties after a series of box office failures. The film won three Filmfare Awards, three ITFA Awards and four Cinema Express Awards. Later that same year, Saran remade the film in Telugu as Gemeni.

== Plot ==
Teja is a high-profile gangster in North Madras who often imitates the behaviour characteristics of different animals for sarcastic effect. Accompanied by his gang, he arrives at a magistrates' court for a hearing. His animal antics are mocked at by "Chintai" Jeeva, another accused. Teja and his gang retaliate and kill Jeeva within the court premises. Jeeva was a member of a rival gang headed by Gemini, an aspiring goon from Chintadripet who wants to dethrone Teja and take his place. To avenge Jeeva's death, Gemini hunts down the murderer Pandian while Isaac, one of Gemini's men, kills him. This incident leads to a feud between Gemini and Teja, and a fight for supremacy ensues. Pandian's mother Annamma, a destitute woman, locates the whereabouts of her son's murderers. She approaches Gemini, becomes the gang's cook, and awaits a chance to poison them.

Gemini meets and falls in love with a North Indian woman Manisha Natwarlal, a free-spirited college girl. To pursue her, he joins an evening class at her college and she falls in love with him, unaware of his true identity. Two businessmen approach Gemini to evict traders from a market so that a shopping complex can be built in its place. As the market is in his control, Gemini refuses the offer, and the businessmen hire Teja to execute the job. Feigning an altercation with Gemini, his sidekick Kai joins Teja's gang, acts as the inside man, and foils the plan. Teja becomes enraged at being outsmarted by Gemini.

Singaperumal, an astute police officer, is promoted to the position of Director General of Police (DGP). Keen on eradicating crime, he arrests both Gemini and Teja, and the arrests are made "off the record" owing to their political influence. Aware of the rivalry between them, Singaperumal puts them in a private cell so they can beat each other to death. While Teja tries to exact revenge for the market issue, Gemini does not fight back but persuades Teja to trick Singaperumal by pleading guilty and requesting a chance to reform. Gemini's trick works, and they are released.

Since Gemini was arrested at the college, Manisha discovers his identity and resents him. To regain her attention, Gemini reforms his ways. Though his gang initially disapproves of it, they relent. As Gemini and his gang regret their actions, Annamma reveals her true identity and forgives them. Singaperumal helps Gemini get back into college and reunite with Manisha. Teja returns to his gang and continues his illegal activities. He pesters Gemini to help him in his business. Gemini informs Singaperumal of Teja's activities; Teja is caught smuggling narcotics, is prosecuted, and serves a term in prison.

A few months later, Singaperumal is transferred, and a corrupt officer takes his place. The current DGP releases Teja, and together, they urge Gemini to work for them and repay for the losses they incurred, but Gemini refuses. To force him to return to his old ways, Teja persuades Isaac to conspire against Gemini. With Isaac's help, Teja plots and kills Kai. Gemini is infuriated and confronts Teja to settle the issue. During the fight, Gemini beats up Teja and swaps their clothes, leaving Teja bound and gagged. The new DGP arrives and shoots Gemini dead; he later realises that he had actually shot Teja who was in Gemini's clothes. While the DGP grieves over Teja's death, he receives news that he has been transferred to the Sewage Control Board.

Gemini lives happily ever after with Manisha.

== Cast ==
- Vikram as Gemini
- Kiran Rathod as Manisha Natwarlal
- Kalabhavan Mani as Teja
- Manorama as Annamma
- Vinu Chakravarthy as Chakravarthy, a power-obsessed, corrupt police officer
- Murali as DGP Singaperumal
- Charle as Chinna Salem
- Ramesh Khanna as Gopal MA
- Dhamu as Ram
- Vaiyapuri as Oberoi
- Rani as Kamini
- Thennavan as Kai
- Isaac Varghese as Isaac
- Thyagu as Sammandham
- Madhan Bob as R. Anilwal IPS
- Ilavarasu as Police Commissioner
- Siva Narayana Murthy
- Sridhar as Sridhar
- Omakuchi Narasimhan as Bombay Dawood
- Chaplin Balu
- Gemini Ganesan in a cameo as himself

== Production ==
=== Development ===
"Yes. It happened a year ago in Chennai. Two rowdies wanted to reform themselves and return to the society. A police officer helped them do so. I was fascinated by the incident."

— Saran, when queried if the film was inspired by a real life incident.

In February 2001, underworld dons "Vellai" Ravi and Chera, who terrorised the city of Madras (now Chennai) in the 1990s, abandoned a life of crime and took up social work. The then-DCP of Flower Bazaar Shakeel Akhter presided over the oath-taking ceremony and welcomed the rehabilitation programme. During the making of his film Alli Arjuna (2002), director Saran came across a newspaper article carrying this piece of news and was fascinated. Shortly afterwards in March 2001, Saran announced his next directorial venture would be inspired by the incident. Titled Erumugam (meaning "upward mobility"), the project was scheduled to enter production after the completion of Alli Arjuna.

The director disclosed that it was "a modern day rags to riches story" where the protagonist rises from humble origins to an enviable position. The venture was to be funded by A. Purnachandra Rao of Lakshmi Productions. The film would mark the director's third collaboration with Ajith Kumar in the lead after the success of Kaadhal Mannan (1998) and Amarkkalam (1999). Laila and Richa Pallod, who played the heroine in Saran's Parthen Rasithen (2000) and Alli Arjuna respectively, were to play the female lead roles. While the recording for the film's audio reportedly began on 16 March 2001, the filming was to start in mid-June and continue until August that year, followed by post-production work in September. It was planned to release the film on 14 November 2001 coinciding with Diwali. However, after finding a more engaging script in Red (2002), Ajith lost interest; he left the project after a week's shoot and the production was shelved. Following this incident, Saran stated that he would never do another film with Ajith. The pair would, however, reconcile their differences later, and collaborate on Attahasam (2004) and Aasal (2010).

Saran rewrote the script based on gang wars in Chennai and began the project again. The film, then untitled, was announced on 24 August 2001 with Vikram to star in the lead role. The production was taken over by M. Saravanan, M. Balasubramaniam, M. S. Guhan and B. Gurunath of AVM Productions. The film was AVM's 162nd production and their first film after a five-year hiatus, their last production being Minsara Kanavu (1997), the release of which marked fifty years since their debut Naam Iruvar (1947). (Note: While AVM have been producing films since 1931 under different names such as Saraswathi Sound Productions, Saraswathi Talkies Producing Company and Pragati Pictures, Naam Iruvar (1947) was the first film produced under the name AVM Productions.) By producing Gemini, AVM became one of the four film studios that had been producing films for over fifty years. While titling the film, producer M. Saravanan chose Gemini among the many titles suggested to him, but because Gemini Studios was the name of a major production house, Saravanan wrote to S. S. Balan, son of Gemini Studios founder S. S. Vasan, requesting permission to use the title. In response, Balan gave his consent.

=== Cast and crew ===
"In Gemini, I have tried to do something new. The character I'm playing is a rowdy, but a bit refined. I study in an evening college and I've presented it as natural and realistically. Just as you expect a Sethu again, I've changed the style a bit."

— Vikram, on how he approached his role.

With Vikram cast in the title role, Saran was searching for a newcomer to play the female lead role of a Marwari woman. Kiran Rathod is a native of Rajasthan, the place where the Marwaris originate from. She is a relative of actress Raveena Tandon, whose manager brought Rathod the offer to act in Gemini. Saran was convinced after seeing a photograph of Rathod and cast her; Gemini thus became her debut Tamil film. Malayalam actors Kalabhavan Mani and Murali were approached to play significant roles.

Gemini is widely believed to be Mani's first Tamil film, though he had already starred in Vaanchinathan (2001). There have been varying accounts on how he was cast: while Vikram claims to have suggested Mani for the role of Teja, Saran said in one interview that casting Mani was his idea, and contradicted this in another interview, saying that Mani was chosen on his wife's recommendation. While searching for an unfamiliar actor for the DGP's role, Saran saw Murali in Dumm Dumm Dumm (2001) and found him "very dignified". He chose Murali as he wanted that dignity for the role. Though he had planned to make Murali a villain at the end of the film, Saran decided against it because he was "amazed to see awe in everyone's eyes when Murali entered the sets and performed". When Saran felt that the audience would not be kind to him and that it would damage the film, he added another corrupt police officer to do the job while maintaining Singaperumal as a "very strong, good police officer". According to Saravanan, this idea was suggested by writer Peter Selvakumar.

Thennavan, Vinu Chakravarthy, Ilavarasu, Charle, Dhamu, Ramesh Khanna, Vaiyapuri, Madhan Bob, Thyagu and Manorama form the supporting cast. Gemini Ganesan made a cameo appearance at the request of Saravanan. The technical departments were handled by Saran's regular crew, which consisted of cinematographer A. Venkatesh, editor Suresh Urs, production designer Thota Tharani and costume designers Sai and Nalini Sriram. The choreography was by Super Subbarayan (action) and Suchitra, Brinda and Ashok Raja (dance). The music was composed by Bharadwaj and the lyrics were written by Vairamuthu. Kanmani who went on to direct films like Aahaa Ethanai Azhagu (2003) and Chinnodu (2006) worked as an assistant director.

=== Filming ===
Gemini was formally launched on 21 November 2001 at the Hotel Connemara, Chennai in the presence of celebrities including Rajinikanth (through video conferencing) and Kamal Haasan. The launch function was marked by the submission of the script, songs and lyrics. Principal photography was scheduled to begin in mid-December that year, but commenced slightly earlier. Vikram shot for the film simultaneously with Samurai (2002). When Kalabhavan Mani was hesitant in accepting the film due to other commitments in Malayalam, shooting was rescheduled to film his scenes first. Saran persuaded Mani to allot dates for twelve days to complete his scenes. Since Mani was a mimicry artist, Saran asked him to exhibit his talents; Mani aped the behaviour of a few animals and Saran chose among them, which were added to the film.

Gemini, with the exception of two songs which were filmed in Switzerland, was shot at AVM Studios. One of the songs, "Penn Oruthi", was shot at Jungfraujoch, the highest railway station in Europe. Part of the song sequence was filmed on a sledge in Switzerland, making it the second Indian film to have done so after the Bollywood film Sangam (1964). Though there were problems in acquiring permission, executive producer M. S. Guhan persisted. The overseas shoots were arranged by Travel Masters, a Chennai-based company owned by former actor N. Ramji. Gemini was completed on schedule and M. Saravanan praised the director, saying, "... we felt like we were working with S. P. Muthuraman himself, such was Saran's efficiency". After watching the film's first cut, Saravanan felt the film lacked emotions and suggested Saran to add scenes with Manorama. Despite getting four days of Manorama's call sheet, all of her scenes were filmed in one day.

== Themes and influences ==
The characters of Gemini and Teja were modelled on "Vellai" Ravi and Chera respectively—Tamil-Burma repatriates who settled in Bhaktavatsalam colony (B.V. Colony) in Vyasarpadi, North Madras. They were members of rival gangs headed by Benjamin and Subbhaiah respectively. Their rivalry began when Benjamin, a DYFI member, questioned the illegal activities of Subbhaiah who, apart from running a plastics and iron ore business, held kangaroo courts. When their feud developed into a Christian-Hindu conflict, they recruited jobless men and formed gangs to wage wars against each other. While Subbhaih's nephew Chera became his right-hand man, "Vellai" Ravi became Benjamin's aide. Benjamin and Ravi's gang killed Subbaiah in 1991. A year later, Chera's gang retaliated by killing Benjamin with the help of another gang member, Asaithambi. Another gangster, Kabilan, joined Chera's gang and they killed more than fourteen people to avenge Subbaiah's murder. One of the murders took place inside the Egmore court in early 2000 when Chera's gang killed Ravi's aide Vijayakumar, leading to a police crackdown on the gangsters. Fearing an encounter, both "Vellai" Ravi and Chera decided to give up their lives of crime and reform. The then-DCP of Flower Bazaar, Shakeel Akhter, held the "transition ceremony" in February 2001. "Vellai" Ravi and Chera were re-arrested under Goondas Act during the film's pre-production.

When asked about his fascination for "rowdy themes", Saran said:

I come from a lower middle class background and have lived all my life in 'Singara Chennai'. I used to go to college from my house in Aminjikkarai by bus and many of the incidents that you see in my films are inspired by those days. Chennai city and its newspapers have been my source material.

The characters of DGP Singaperumal and "Chintai" Jeeva were based on Shakeel Akhter and Vijayakumar respectively.

== Music ==
The soundtrack album and background score were composed by Bharadwaj. Since making his entry into Tamil films with Saran's directorial debut Kaadhal Mannan, he has scored the music for most films directed by Saran. The lyrics were written by poet-lyricist Vairamuthu.

The songs were well received by the audience, especially "O Podu". The music received positive reviews from critics. Sify wrote that Bharadwaj's music was the film's only saving grace. Writing for Rediff, Pearl stated that the music director was "impressive". Malathi Rangarajan of The Hindu said that the song by Anuradha Sriram has given the term "O! Podu!", which has been part of the "local lingo" for years, a "new, crazy dimension". The song enjoyed anthem-like popularity and according to V. Paramesh, a dealer of film music for 23 years, sold like "hot cakes". The album sold more than 100,000 cassettes even before the film released despite rampant piracy. It was one of the biggest hits in Bharadwaj's career and earned him his first Filmfare Award.

In 2009, Mid-Day wrote, "O podu is still considered the cornerstone of the rambunctious koothu dance". In 2011, The Times of India labelled the song an "evergreen hit number". Following the internet phenomenon of "Why This Kolaveri Di" in 2011, "O Podu" was featured alongside "Appadi Podu", "Naaka Mukka" and "Ringa Ringa" in a small collection of South Indian songs that are considered a "national rage" in India. Some of the lyrics in song "Katta Katta" was muted by producers for the film after censor board did not agree with the lyrics.

== Release ==
The film, which was supposed to be released on 14 April 2002 coinciding with the Tamil New Year, was released two days early on 12 April, apparently to capitalise on weekend collections. Gemini was released alongside Vijay's Thamizhan, Prashanth's Thamizh and Vijayakanth's Raajjiyam. The film was released across Tamil Nadu with 104 prints, the most for a Vikram film at the time of release. On the day of release, the film premiered in Singapore with the hero, heroine, director and producer in attendance. AVM sold the film to distributors for a "reasonable profit" and marketed it aggressively. They organised promotional events at Music World in Chennai's Spencer Plaza, Landmark and Sankara Hall, where Vikram publicised the film signing autographs. Since "O Podu" was such a hit among children, AVM invited young children to write reviews, and gave away prizes. In 2006, Saran revealed in a conversation with director S. P. Jananathan that his nervousness rendered him sleepless for four days until the film was released.

== Reception ==
=== Critical response ===
Gemini received mixed reviews from critics. Malathi Rangarajan of The Hindu wrote that the "Vikram style" action film was more of a stylised fare as realism was a casualty in many sequences. She added that while the credibility level of the storyline was low, Saran had tried to strike a balance in making a formulaic film. Pearl of Rediff.com lauded Saran's "racy" screenplay but found the plot "hackneyed" and reminiscent of Saran's Amarkkalam. The critic declared, "Gemini is your typical masala potboiler. And it works." In contrast, Sify was critical of the film and wrote, "Neither exciting nor absorbing Gemini is as hackneyed as they get. [...] Saran should be blamed for this inept movie, which has no storyline and has scant regard for logic or sense."

The performance of the lead also earned mixed response. Malathi Rangarajan analysed, "Be it action or sensitive enactment, Vikram lends a natural touch [...] helps Gemini score. [..] With his comic streak Mani makes himself a likeable villain." Kalabhavan Mani's mimicry and portrayal of a villain with a comic sense received acclaim from the critics and audience alike. Rediff said, "The highlight in Gemini is undoubtedly Kalabhavan Mani's performance. [...] As the paan-chewing Gemini, Vikram, too, delivers a convincing performance." However, Sify found the cast to be the film's major drawback and scrutinised, "Vikram as Gemini is unimpressive [...] Kalabhavan Mani an excellent actor hams as he plays a villain [...] Top character actor Murali is also wasted in the film."

Following the film's success, Vikram was compared with actor Rajinikanth. D. Govardan of The Economic Times wrote, "The film's success has catapulted its hero, Vikram as the most sought after hero after Rajinikanth in the Tamil film industry today". Rajinikanth, who saw the film, met Vikram and praised his performance. Saran told in an interview that Rajinikanth was so impressed with the songs, he predicted the film's success in addition to considering Rathod for a role in his film Baba (2002). The film's premise of an outlaw reforming his ways was appreciated. D. Ramanaidu of Suresh Productions—the co-producer of the Telugu remake—said, "The story of a rowdy sheeter turning into a good man is a good theme". In August 2014, Gemini was featured in a list of "Top 10 Tamil Gangster Films" compiled by Saraswathi of Rediff.com.

In an article discussing the rise of the gangster-based film becoming a genre in itself, Sreedhar Pillai wrote in a reference to Gemini:

The hero is an all out villain, who is daringly different but the director makes him dream of those lush Switzerland songs (our hero then is clad in designer wear). The rowdies in the film have very highly educated girls from affluent family lusting after them ... [Amitabh] Bachchan of "Deewar" or Shah Rukh [Khan] of "Baazigar" took to crime because they were wronged. Nowadays the Geminis and Nandas of Tamil cinema indulge in crime for the heck of it.

=== Box office ===
Gemini was a success and became the biggest hit of the year in Tamil. Made on an estimated budget of ₹40 million (equivalent to ₹170 million or US$1.8 million in 2026), the film grossed more than ₹200 million (equivalent to ₹830 million or US$8.9 million in 2026). (Note: Writing for The Hindu, film journalist Sreedhar Pillai claimed that the budget was ₹35 million (equivalent to ₹150 million or US$1.6 million in 2026) while D. Govardan, writing for The Economic Times, claimed it to be ₹40 million (equivalent to ₹170 million or US$1.8 million in 2026).) The film's success was largely attributed to the popularity of the song "O Podu". D. Govardan of The Economic Times stated, "A neatly made 'masala' (spice) film, with the song O Podu.. as its USP, it took off from day one and has since then not looked back". Vikram, who was a struggling actor for almost a decade, credited Gemini as his first real blockbuster. Sreedhar Pillai said that a good story, presentation and peppy music made it a "winning formula" and declared "Gemini has been the biggest hit among Tamil films in the last two years". However, the sceptics in the industry dismissed the film's success as a fluke.

The film ran successfully in theatres for more than 125 days. Since most Tamil films released on the preceding Diwali and Pongal were not successful, Gemini helped the industry recover. Outlook wrote, "Gemini has single-handedly revived the Tamil film industry." The box office collections revived the fortunes of theatres that were on the verge of closure. AVM received a letter from the owner of New Cinema, a theatre in Cuddalore, who repaid his debts with the revenue the film generated. Abirami Ramanathan, owner of the multiplex Abhirami Mega Mall, said that Gemini's success would slow down the rapid closure of theatres from 2,500 to 2,000. Following the success of the film, Saran named his production house "Gemini Productions", under which he produced films including Aaru (2005), Vattaram (2006) and Muni (2007).

== Accolades ==
Award	Ceremony	Category	Nominee(s)	Outcome	Ref.
Filmfare Awards South	50th Filmfare Awards South	Best Music Director	Bharadwaj	Won	
Filmfare Awards South	50th Filmfare Awards South	Best Female Playback Singer	Anuradha Sriram	Won	
Filmfare Awards South	50th Filmfare Awards South	Best Villain	Kalabhavan Mani	Won	
International Tamil Film Awards	1st International Tamil Film Awards	Best Actor	Vikram	Won	
International Tamil Film Awards	1st International Tamil Film Awards	Best Villain	Kalabhavan Mani	Won	
International Tamil Film Awards	1st International Tamil Film Awards	Best Singer Female	Anuradha Sriram	Won	
Cinema Express Awards	22nd Cinema Express Awards	Best New Face Actress	Kiran Rathod	Won	
Cinema Express Awards	22nd Cinema Express Awards	Best Music Director	Bharadwaj	Won	
Cinema Express Awards	22nd Cinema Express Awards	Best Dialogue Writer	Saran	Won	
Cinema Express Awards	22nd Cinema Express Awards	Best Singer Female	Anuradha Sriram	Won	

== Remakes ==
Encouraged by the film's success and wide-reaching popularity, Saran remade it in Telugu as Gemeni. It is the only film Saran made in a language other than Tamil. (Note: Saran had planned to remake Amarkkalam in Hindi after the completion of the former, with Vivek Oberoi in the lead. The project however failed to commence.) The remake starred Venkatesh and Namitha, while Kalabhavan Mani and Murali reprised their roles from the Tamil version. Most of the crew members were retained. Posani Krishna Murali translated the dialogues to Telugu. The soundtrack was composed by R. P. Patnaik, who reused "O Podu" from the original film. Released in October 2002, the film received lukewarm response and failed to repeat the success of the original. In 2013, a Kannada remake was reported to have been planned with Upendra in the lead, but he dismissed the reports as rumours.

== Legacy ==
In September 2002, Gemini was screened as part of a six-day workshop jointly conducted by the Department of Journalism and Communication and the Mass Communication Alumni Association of the University of Madras; it focussed on the impact of cinema on society.

The success of the film prompted other film producers to capitalise on the growing popularity of the phrase "O Podu" and Vikram. The Telugu film Seema Simham (2002) was dubbed and released in Tamil as O Podu, while Vikram's Telugu film Aadaalla Majaka (1995) and Malayalam film Itha Oru Snehagatha (1997) were swiftly dubbed and released into Tamil as Vahini and Thrill respectively. A game-based reality show for children, which was aired between 2003 and 2004, was titled "O Podu". AVM was involved in the show, which was produced by Vikatan Televistas and directed by Gerald. The show was broadcast for 26 weeks on Sun TV on Sundays with Raaghav as its anchor. In September 2003, physical trainer Santosh Kumar played "O Podu" among a range of popular music as part of a dance aerobics session in a fitness camp held for the Indian cricket team at Bangalore.

When Vikram was signed up as the brand ambassador of Coca-Cola in April 2005, the commercials featured him playing characters from different walks of life. One among them was a "rowdy role", the essence for which was taken from the character Gemini. During the run-up to the 2006 assembly election, Chennai-based journalist Gnani Sankaran began a social awareness movement to prevent electoral fraud and named it "O Podu" as a short form of "Oatu Podu" meaning "cast your vote". The movement urged the electorate to exercise the right to reject candidates under Section 49-O of The Conduct of Election Rules, 1961, wherein a voter, who has decided not to vote for anyone, can record the fact. For this purpose, the people behind "O Podu" also urged the election commission to facilitate a separate button on the electronic voting machine.

During the 2010 Asia Cup, a Sri Lankan band performed "O Podu" at the India vs. Pakistan cricket match held in Dambulla. In July 2011, Vikram inaugurated "Liver 4 Life", an initiative launched by MIOT Hospitals to create awareness of the Hepatitis B virus. As the campaign was targeted at school and college students, the organisers tweaked the term "O Podu" into "B Podu" and made it the event's tagline to capitalise on the song's immense appeal. In a comical sequence in the film, Dhamu's character claims to be an expert of a martial art form named "Maan Karate" (Maan means "Deer"), which is actually the art of running away like a deer when in danger. The phrase became famous and was used to name the 2014 comedy film Maan Karate because whenever there is a problem in his life, the hero (played by Sivakarthikeyan) fails to face them and runs for cover instead.
