= Aasal =

2010 Tamil-language film directed by Saran

- Theatrical release poster
- Directed by: Saran
- Written by: Ajith Kumar; Yugi Sethu; Saran
- Produced by: Prabhu
- Starring: Ajith Kumar; Prabhu; Sameera Reddy; Bhavana
- Narrated by: Saran
- Cinematography: Prashanth D. Misale
- Edited by: Anthony Gonsalves
- Music by: Bharadwaj
- Production company: Sivaji Productions
- Distributed by: Sivaji Productions; Ayngaran International
- Release date: 5 February 2010
- Running time: 135 minutes
- Country: India
- Language: Tamil
- Budget: ₹21.7 crores

Aasal (transl. Original) is a 2010 Indian Tamil-language action thriller film directed by Saran, who co-wrote the script with Ajith Kumar and Yugi Sethu. The film stars Ajith in dual roles, alongside Sameera Reddy, Bhavana, Prabhu, Pradeep Rawat, Sampath Raj and Rajiv Krishna The film, produced by Prabhu of Sivaji Productions, features music primarily composed by Bharadwaj, cinematography by Prashanth D. Misale and editing by Anthony Gonsalves.

The film revolves around a feud among three brothers over property; where the first two brothers got enraged when their father gave all the family's wealth to the righteous third son, trying to stop the family from breaking down. The feud that exists as an undercurrent in the presence of their father and turns ugly and personal after he dies. It grows bigger with the two brothers joining in to wipe out the third, but he graciously steps aside, only wanting to keep cordial relations. But, the two brothers are just not able to handle the huge wealth and the responsibility that it brings. Their wealth attracts trouble, and it is up to the third to come back and save his brothers, against others who strive for the wealth, while the crux of the plot revolves around if wealth does disintegrate the family.

Pre-production for the project began in December 2007 when Sivaji Productions signed Ajith for a film; however, due to several changes in the technical crew, shooting only began in April 2009. The filming took place in various locations: notably locally in Chennai, and abroad in Paris, Dubai and Kuala Lumpur. The film opened worldwide on 550 screens (including 350 screens in India) following its release on 5 February 2010. However, it only became an average grosser at the box office.

== Plot ==
Jeevanandham is an international negotiator and arms dealer based in Paris. He has three sons: Sam, Vicky and Shiva. Jeevanandham's favorite is Shiva, who is gutsy and righteous, while the other two are immature, controlled by their evil uncle Kali Mamma, and will do any shady deals.

Sarah is Jeevanantham's secretary at the Indian Embassy in Paris, and she has a crush on Shiva. Daniel Dharmaraj is a French police officer who constantly hangs around with the family and is a partner in crime.

Sam and Vicky want to deal in drugs and supply arms to terrorists. They work out a strategy to eliminate Shetty, who controls the Mumbai underworld, but Jeevanandham and Shiva oppose it. After Jeevanandham's death, Shetty and his gang kidnap Vicky, whom they brutally torture. To save Vicky, Shiva goes to Mumbai. His local contact there is Mirasi, his father's best friend. Sulabha, a local girl, falls in love with Shiva, who daringly rescues Vicky with the joker Don Samosa.

Both brothers double-cross Shiva, shoot him, and drown him in the sea. They torture Sarah and make her sign as a witness that Shiva dies naturally. As per Jeevanandam's will, the property rights belong to Shiva, so Sam and Vicky attempted to kill Shiva. With the help of Mirasi, Sulabha, and Don Samosa, everyone moves to France to find the real enemies. Sarah is being given drugs to forget Shiva's death, and Vicky tortures her every day to accept his love. Shiva finds her and confesses everything to him. Vicky walks in and brutally beats Sarah. Shiva shoots him and interrogates him to find out the reason why the two brothers shot him. After Vicky refuses to say, Shiva shoots him on the spot and saves Sarah. Sam finds out about Vicky's death and suspects Daniel, but Kali Mamma subdues him. Shiva slowly uncovers what happened by forcing and threatening the allies of Sam and Kali Mamma. Eventually, a drunk Don Samosa accidentally spills Shiva's being alive to Daniel, who kidnaps Mirasi, Sulabha, and Sarah and holds them captive in a storage facility. Shiva is forced to surrender Jeevanandham's will to Kali Mamma and Sam, but instead delivers an empty suitcase. An infuriated Kali Mamma shoots Mirasi and Daniel, and Sam throws Shiva out a glass window and ties him up. After Shiva tells Sam to give up his arrogance, Sam and Kali Mamma reveal why and how they killed Jeevanandham.

Past: Sam wanted to deal weapons to foreign terrorists and asked Jeevananandham to give money to aid them. After Jeevanandham tries reasoning to little avail, Kali Mamma walks in. After he refuses everyone's request to deal weapons and give his money, Kali Mamma electrocutes, and Sam suffocates Jeevanandham, killing him.

Present: They do the same with Shiva after explaining, electrocuting him multiple times, but eventually, an enraged Shiva breaks the ropes he is tied to and engages in combat with Sam and Kali Mamma, electrocuting and killing both of them. Daniel, now a reformed, honest cop, brings Mirasi to Shiva and tells him that he will take the blame for Sam and Kali Mamma's deaths by saying that he killed them in self-defense.

The film ends several months later with Shiva and Sulabha, now married, waving goodbye to Don Samosa, Sarah, and Mirasi, and leaving for India from Paris together.

== Cast ==
- Ajith Kumar in dual role as
  - Shiva
  - Jeevanantham (Shiva, Sam and Vicky's father)
- Prabhu as Mirasi
- Sameera Reddy as Sarah, Jeevanantham's secretary who has a crush on Shiva
- Bhavana as Sulabha Pillai, Shiva's love interest turned wife
- Pradeep Rawat as Kali Mamma
- Sampath Raj as Sam, Shiva's first elder brother
- Rajiv Krishna as Vicky, Shiva's second elder brother
- Kelly Dorji as Brijesh Shetty
- Suresh as Daniel Dharmaraj
- Yugi Sethu as Don Samosa
- Ravi Prakash as Santhosh
- Yog Japee as Advocate
- Karmanya Sapru as Lee
- Surendra Pal
- Badhra as Don Samosa's sidekick
- Balaji K. Mohan as Don Samosa's sidekick
- Sravan as a Telugu-speaking man

== Production ==
=== Preproduction ===
Following the success of Billa in December 2007, Ajith Kumar was signed by Prabhu's Sivaji Productions for a project touted to be directed by K. S. Ravikumar. Three months later, the producers officially signed on Gautham Vasudev Menon as the director; Sameera Reddy, the female lead for Menon's last film and second Tamil Film After Vaaranam Aayiram, was also finalised for the project. Initially, the producer was considering Anushka Shetty as the female lead. The film, which was due to start its first schedule during June 2008, had been built up as the final installment in Gautham Vasudev Menon's police trilogy, following his two earlier ventures, Kaaka Kaaka and Vettaiyaadu Vilaiyaadu, of which Ajith was originally meant to be a part. However, other indications suggested that the film was set to be the remake of the classic, Pudhiya Paravai starring Sivaji Ganesan, which Ganesan's son, Prabhu, denied. The film had been earlier titled by the media as Kanavugal Karpanaigal or Vaanam Kadandha Siragugal, but the team then finalised the title of Surangani, which was later abbreviated to Sura. However, the film's production failed to take off, with repeated dates being announced by the directors for the film's first schedule throughout 2009. Subsequently, Menon was removed from the project by the producers due to the film's inactivity, with directors Dharani, Vishnuvardhan and Saran leading the race to take over.

=== Development ===
In January 2009, the film was reannounced by Prabhu and the story was subsequently changed with Saran being signed up as the film's director. Ajith also underwent an appearance change during the early months of 2009 to prepare for his role. The film was eventually launched on 8 April 2009 at Sivaji's family residence Annai Illam in Chennai. The film completed its production schedule by January 2010, and post-production and release works began soon after.

=== Casting ===
Following the announcement that Sivaji Productions, Ajith Kumar and Gautham Vasudev Menon would come together, other technicians were added to the film. Menon's usual collaborator, Harris Jayaraj, was signed on as the music composer. However, after Menon's departure, Jayaraj also left the project due to his busy schedule with other films. After approaching Yuvan Shankar Raja for the job, Saran finally confirmed Bharadwaj as music director. Asal was Bharadwaj's 50th film as composer; he had previously teamed up with Saran and Ajith on Kadhal Mannan, Amarkkalam and Attagasam. Ajith was under contract to be paid a remuneration of $1.25 million in cash plus a 30 per cent share of the profit from sales of rights of the film.

During the launch in April 2009, other film technicians were revealed. Y-Kinz, an international music group, were announced to be a part of the music album for the film headed with Bharadwaj. Ajith himself had recommended Prashanth D. Misale, an assistant to Nirav Shah, to make his debut as a cinematographer. Anthony was selected as editor; Prabakar was chosen to work as the art director and Vairamuthu as the chief lyricist. Vivek Karunakaran, a Chennai-based fashion designer, was selected to make his debut as the film's costume designer. Soon after the launch, co-producer Prabhu cast himself to play an important role in the film. Gautham Menon's original choice, Sameera Reddy, was retained to star opposite Ajith in the film. Initially Anushka Shetty was considered for the role. Sameera appears alongside Ajith for the first time, despite previously being scheduled to appear opposite him in Citizen, which eventually went ahead without her. Mamta Mohandas was initially confirmed as the second heroine in Asal, but decided not to take the role. Sneha, Shriya Saran, newcomer Hansika Motwani and Bhavana were also approached for the second heroine's role, however Sneha was unable to comply due to call sheet problems, so Bhavana was finalised. A plethora of antagonistic roles were handed out for the film, with the initial selection being Rajiv Krishna. Other cast members are Pradeep Rawat, Kelly Dorji, Karen Miao Sapru, Adithya, Suresh, Sampath Raj, Surendra Pal and Yugi Sethu.

=== Filming ===
Principal photography of the film began in June 2009 at an undisclosed location in Malaysia. The first schedule was completed on 2 August 2009. After a hectic schedule from Malaysia, the shooting for the second schedule continued on 18 September 2009 at Paris and Lyon, France. 30% of the scenes, including fight sequences and two song sequences, were canned there, including a duet song of Ajith and Sameera as pictured against the moonlit Eiffel Tower in Paris. After a 45-day shoot, the team returned to Chennai on 23 October 2009. Additional shooting was held in Harrington Road on 2 November. Asal's team later shot some of the important shots in AVM Studios. The film's dubbing schedule took off on 19 November at Four Frames Preview Theatre Chennai with a simple pooja ceremony. Ajith, Saran, Arjun (Prabhu's son), Dushyanth (Ramkumar's son) and other members of the film were present there. On 24 November 2009, an important scene for the film was shot at Sivaji Ganesan's house in T. Nagar, Chennai. A song sequence featuring Ajith and Bhavana was shot at the AVM Studios on 25 November 2009. The shooting of the final song was held at Binny Mills (Tambaram). The cast and crew of Asal went to the UAE for the remaining song shoot. The Asal unit left Chennai on 26 December and returned after a week. Shooting was finished on 31 December 2009 at Dubai, where a song sequence was filmed at Zabeel Park.

== Soundtrack ==
Aasal

Soundtrack album by Bharadwaj
- Released: 4 January 2010
- Recorded: Jay Jay Studios Chennai
- Genre: Film soundtrack
- Length: 33:25
- Label: Ayngaran Music; An Ak Audio; Think Music; AVM Muzik
- Producer: Bharadwaj

Bharadwaj chronology
Solla Solla Inikkum (2009)	Aasal (2010)	Nandhi (2011)

The film's soundtrack was released on 4 January 2010. The soundtrack has music by Bharadwaj with lyrics by Vairamuthu. The song "Yea Dushyantha" borrows some of its orchestration from song "Ye Ishq Hai" from Jab We Met (2007). The title song reuses the lyric "Thala Pola Varuma" from Attagasam (2004).

The audio distribution rights were given to Ayngaran Music and An Ak Audio. Think Music, an association of Sathyam Cinemas and Hungama Technology. The audio was launched at Sivaji Ganesan's house in T Nagar, Chennai by Prabhu, one of the producers, and was received by Ajith.

No.	Title	Singer(s)	Length
1.	"Aasal"	Sunitha Menon	4:50
2.	"Kanava Ninaiva"	V. V. Prasanna, Manjari	4:06
3.	"Kuthiraikku Theriyum"	Surmukhi Raman, Sreecharan	4:48
4.	"Tottodaing"	Mukesh Mohamed, Janani	4:01
5.	"Yengay Yengay"	S. P. Balasubrahmanyam	4:04
6.	"Yea Dushyantha"	Kumaran, Surmukhi Raman	5:05
7.	"Em Thandhai"	Bharadwaj	3:34
8.	"Yengay Yengay"	M. L. R. Karthikeyan & Chorus	2:57

== Release ==
=== Reception ===
Sify cited that the film, which "should have been called Billa-2", "falls flat due to lack of proper story and narration", adding, that the film "belongs to Ajith" and "it is a good ride if you keep your expectation meter low". Pavithra Srinivasan from Rediff gave the film 2 out of 5 as well, citing that the film is for "die-hard Ajith fans", who would have "plenty of reasons to rejoice", whilst the others should "leave their brains at home". The reviewer, like Sify, also adds that the film has a "Billa hangover".
