= Ragasya =

Indian actress

Ragasiya
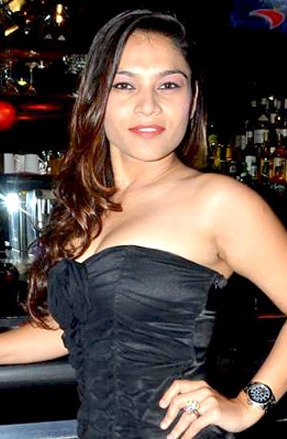
- Born: Vedica Shivsagar; 24 September 1988 (age 38); Mumbai, Maharashtra, India
- Other names: Rahasya; Ragasiya
- Occupations: Actress; model

Ragasiya is an Indian actress, runway model, and theater artist.

== Career ==
She started her career as an assistant choreographer to Pony Verma, Longie Fernandes, Raju Khan and later she started doing theaters with Gary Richardson for Mad Horses. She started her modelling career by doing catalogue shoot for "roopam" owned by Viren Shah, walked on ramp for Nisha Jhampwal, Umer Zafer. Saran who also rechristened her as Ragasiya. After that she did many promotional item numbers mostly in Tamil films. She has also played supporting roles in films like Indira Vizha and Velmurugan Borewells.'.

== Filmography ==
Actress

| Year | Film | Role | Language | Notes |
|---|---|---|---|---|
| 2006 | Perarasu | Jasmine | Tamil | |
| 2007 | Bombay to Goa | | Hindi | |
| 2009 | Indira Vizha | Stella | Tamil | |
| 2009 | Munnar | Vandana | Tamil | As Heroine |
| 2011 | Seniors | Vaduthala Valsala | Malayalam | |
| 2014 | Velmurugan Borewells | Dhanam | Tamil | |

Dancer

| Year | Film | Language |
|---|---|---|
| 2004 | Vasool Raja MBBS | Tamil |
| 2004 | M. Kumaran S/O Mahalakshmi | Tamil |
| 2004 | Attahasam | Tamil |
| 2005 | Devathaiyai Kanden | Tamil |
| 2005 | Sukran | Tamil |
| 2005 | February 14 | Tamil |
| 2005 | Daas | Tamil |
| 2005 | Amudhae | Tamil |
| 2006 | Paramasivan | Tamil |
| 2006 | Dishyum | Tamil |
| 2006 | Aran | Tamil |
| 2007 | Raju Bhai | Telugu |
| 2007 | Okkadunnadu | Telugu |
| 2007 | Piragu | Tamil |
| 2007 | Nee Naan Nila | Tamil |
| 2008 | Yaaradi Nee Mohini | Tamil |
| 2008 | Saamida | Tamil |
| 2008 | Homam | Telugu |
| 2008 | Annan Thambi | Malayalam |
| 2008 | Minchina Ota | Kannada |
| 2008 | Arjun | Kannada |
| 2009 | Naalai Namadhe | Tamil |
| 2009 | Vaigai | Tamil |
| 2009 | Mathiya Chennai | Tamil |
| 2009 | Odipolama | Tamil |
| 2010 | Kandahar | Malayalam |
| 2010 | Mandabam | Tamil |
| 2010 | Ambasamudram Ambani | Tamil |
| 2010 | Ragalaipuram | Tamil |
| 2010 | Thottupaar | Tamil |
| 2013 | Chandhamama | Tamil |
