= Enna Satham Indha Neram =

2014 Indian film by M. Saravanan

- Theatrical release poster
- Directed by: Guru Ramesh
- Produced by: A. V. Anoop
- Starring: Aditi; Aakriti; Akshiti; Aapti
- Cinematography: Sanjay. B. Lokanath
- Edited by: V. T. Vijayan; T. S. Jay
- Music by: Naga
- Production company: A. V. A Productions
- Distributed by: RPP Film Factory
- Release date: 27 June 2014
- Country: India
- Language: Tamil

Enna Satham Indha Neram (transl. What is the noise at this time?) is a 2014 Indian Tamil language comedy thriller film directed by Guru Ramesh and produced by A. V. Anoop. The film features quadruplets Adhiti, Aakrithi, Akshiti, and Aapthi in the lead roles, with Nithin Sathya, Mohan Raja, Maanu, Malavika Wales, N. Puralavan and Imman Annachi also appearing in prominent roles.

== Plot ==
The film tells the story of mute quadruplets who lose their way inside a zoo where they came for an excursion. The zookeeper Kadhir rescues them after a whole day's effort.

== Cast ==
- Aditi, Aakriti, Akshiti and Aapti as the quadruplets
- Nithin Sathya as Kadhir
- Mohan Raja as Raja
- Maanu as Anu
- Malavika Wales as Meenakshi
- N. Puralavan as Sabha
- Imman Annachi as a zookeeper
- Manobala as a kidnapper
- Sivasankar as a kidnapper
- Swaminathan as Murugaraj
- Mahanadi Shankar as Inspector Pandian
- Nisha Krishnan as a journalist
- Vaiyapuri as the Malayali tea stall owner

== Production ==
=== Casting ===
Enna Satham Indha Neram is the first film in Tamil cinema to feature quadruplets prominently. Guru Ramesh considered his decision to include quadruplets in his script as "unrealistic". While casting, he came to know of the quadruplets through a friend. The parents of the twins were initially sceptical towards their casting, but after Ramesh narrated the script to them, they agreed. Mohan Raja was signed to act as the father of the quadruplets, making his acting debut. He had shot for only six days. On Raja's casting, Ramesh said, "Despite being a celebrity director, he didn't complain when I told him that he was not a full-fledged protagonist. He was fine with it. In fact, I would say there is no one protagonist in the film."

The film was also marked the comeback of actress Maanu, who was last seen in Kaadhal Mannan (1998). After Ramesh narrated the script to her, she told him that she was not interested in acting in the film. He later took her and Singapore-based theatre actor Puravalan to meet actor Rajinikanth (both Maanu and Puralavan took care of Rajinikanth at Singapore when he was sick in 2011), and narrated the script to him. On Rajinikanth's suggestion, Maanu finally accepted to act in the film, although his only concern was whether she should play "a mother of four seven-year-olds", which was not an issue for her. Malavika Wales, who portrays a teacher for deaf and mute students, attended a workshop for learning sign languages.

=== Filming ===
95% of the film was shot at the Zoological Park in Hyderabad, making it the first film to be shot predominantly inside a zoological park. The film was also shot at Vandalur Zoo in Chennai, making the crew of Enna Satham Indha Neram the first to shoot there. Some portions were also shot at Thalakkonam falls. The crew thus entered the film in the Limca Book of Records under these credentials.

== Music ==
The music was composed by Naga, and the lyrics were written by Meenachi Sundaram.

Track listing
No.	Title	Singer(s)	Length
1.	"Vizhiyal Pesum" (Female version)	Chinmayi Sripada	4:19
2.	"Vizhiyal Pesum" (Male version)	Haricharan	4:19
3.	"Title Music"	Ardra	1:57
4.	"Theme Music" (Instrumental)	—	2:28
Total length:			13:03

== Critical reception ==
M. Suganth of The Times of India rated it 1.5 out of 5 stars, saying "The only sensible beings in the film are the kids themselves, and they seem more than capable of taking care of themselves, despite their age and disabilities — when one of them falls in a pit, they rescue her all by themselves, intelligently signal their location with balloons, and even use the tab that they have to find their way out of the place. And, it is only for them that you even endure the film." S Saraswathi of Rediff.com gave the film the same rating and wrote, "Though the story begins on a promising note, there is nothing to hold your attention. Even at just an hour and forty minutes, the film seems really long. Neither the girls' ordeal at the zoo nor the rescue mission is interesting". Udhav Naig of The Hindu said, "Despite the emotional set-up — four hearing- and speech-impaired children have lost their way inside the zoo with a giant snake — it's a bummer, from start to finish." Mythili Ramachandran of Gulf News wrote, "Completely lacking in conviction, Enna Satham Indha Neram makes a lot of noise but is a case of empty cans." Malini Mannath of The New Indian Express wrote, "Enna satham.... is an Anaconda-Jurassic Park mix. What the director needs to be appreciated is his casting of identical quadruplets. They are pert, cute and lovable. And it's their screen presence that is worth a watch in the film".
