= Maanu (actress) =

Indian dancer

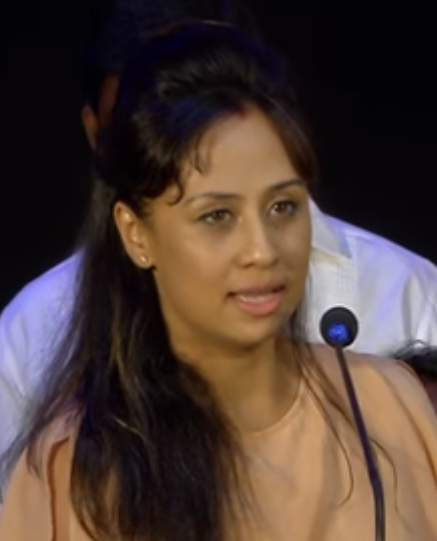
- Mannu in 2018
- Born: Krishnakshi Sharma; Guwahati, Assam, India
- Occupation: Dancer
- Years active: 1998; 2014

Maanu is an Indian dancer and former actress. After making her film debut with Saran's Kadhal Mannan (1998), she opted against an acting career and continued pursuing her passion as a dancer by setting up a performing arts company and featuring in dance troupes worldwide. She resurfaced in 2011, when she aided actor Rajinikanth's recovery from ill health in Singapore, and briefly returned to acting with Enna Satham Indha Neram (2014).

== Career ==
Maanu was born and brought up in Guwahati, Assam, and began dancing by the age of 4. She completed her Bisharad in Manipuri and Kathak dance under the guidance of Gurumoni Sinha Singh, Guru Arabinda Kalita and Guru Hajuwari in 1992 and 1995 respectively. She then extensively trained in Bharathanatyam and performed her arangetram in 1995 under the supervision of her guru, Padma Hargopal. After embarking on a national dance tour, her passion for dancing brought her to Chennai to gain training under the Dhananjayans. After seeing her perform during a dance show, actor Vivek recommended her to director Saran, who then offered her the lead role in his directorial debut Kadhal Mannan (1998). Maanu initially turned down the opportunity, but signed on six months later after her parents consented. Despite the film's success, Maanu opted not to continue as an actress and set up her own dance company, Maanu Artz. She also participated with dance troupes worldwide, being the lead player in Sivagami, Living Tree, Madhavi and Konjum Salangai, a classical dance programme.

After getting married, Maanu moved to Singapore and resurfaced in the media in 2011, when she was promoting a Singaporean film in India titled Singayil Kurushetram and then involved in aiding Rajinikanth's recovery from his illness. The producer of the film had been close to Rajinikanth, and had asked Maanu to look after the actor during his stay in Singapore. During the same year, she shot for a telefilm titled Ezhuthatha Kadhai shot in Sri Lanka and also worked with her husband Sandeep Durah, a cancer surgeon, in a medical camp in Colombo. She also helped stage a bilingual duology production titled Bhishma the Grandsire in English and Bhisma the Pitamaha in Tamil in Chennai. She appeared in her second Tamil film, Enna Satham Indha Neram (2014) portraying the role of the mother of quadruplets, sixteen years after making her acting debut. The film's director Guru Ramesh had narrated the script to her and she had initially told him that she was not interested in acting in the film. He later took her to meet actor Rajinikanth, and narrated the script in front of him. On Rajinikanth's suggestion, Maanu finally accepted to act in the film, although his only concern was whether she should play "a mother of four seven-year-olds", which was not an issue for Maanu. The film had a low-profile release and performed poorly at the box office.

== Filmography ==
Year	Film	Role	Notes
1998	Kadhal Mannan	Thilothamma	
2014	Enna Satham Indha Neram	Anu	

== See also ==
- List of Indian actresses
