= Pooja Umashankar =

Indian-Sri Lankan actress (born 1981)

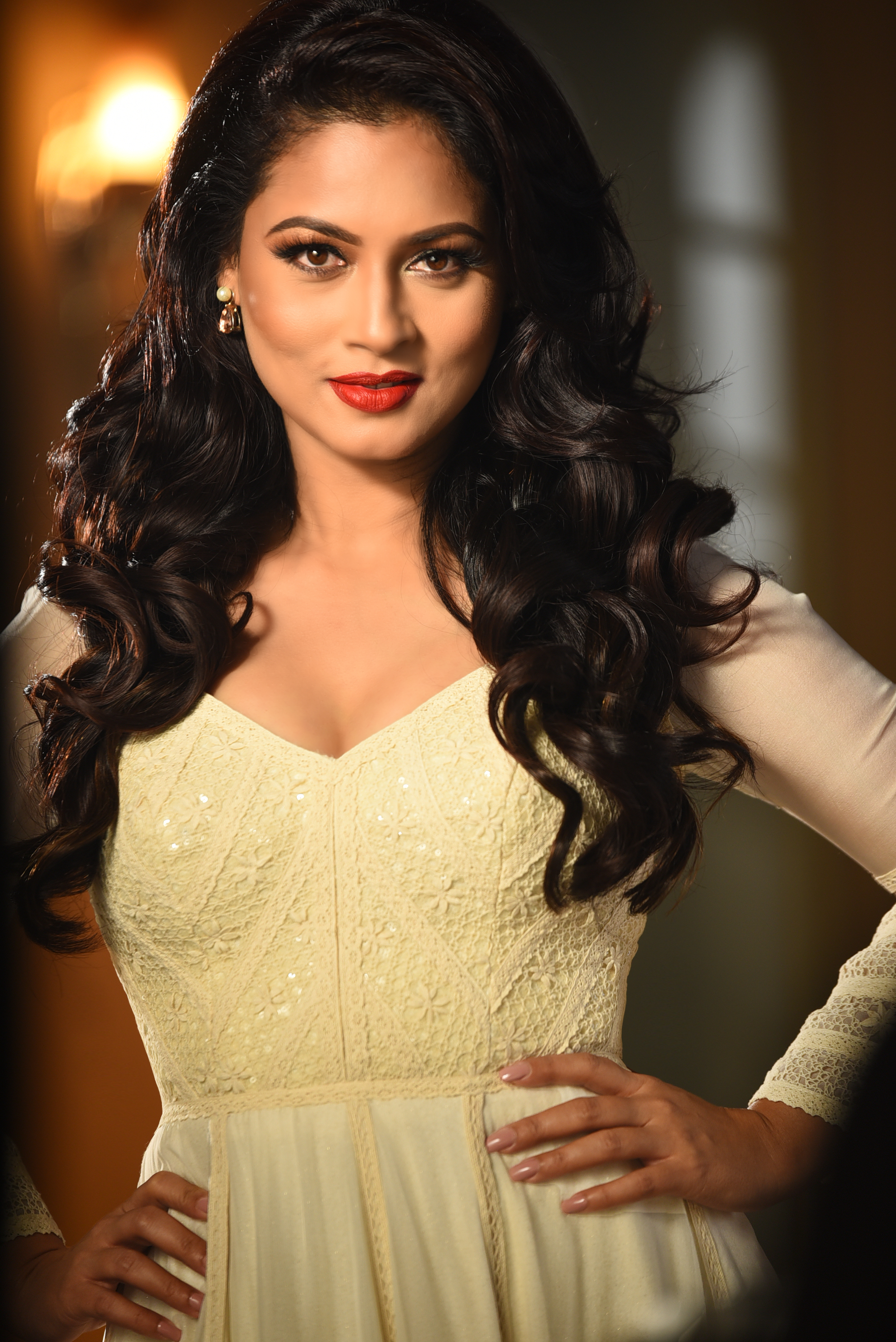
- Pooja in 2012
- Born: Pooja Gauthami Umashankar; June 25, 1981 (age 45); Colombo, Sri Lanka
- Education: Baldwin Girls' High School, Bangalore; Mount Carmel College, Bangalore
- Occupations: Model, Actress
- Years active: 2003–2024
- Spouse: Prashan David Vethakan (m. 2016)

Pooja Gauthami Umashankar is an Indian-Sri Lankan former actress who has primarily appeared in Indian Tamil and Sri Lankan Sinhala movies.

== Early and personal life ==
Pooja was born on June 25, 1981, in Colombo, Sri Lanka. Pooja's father, H. R. Umashankar, is an Indian Kannada Brahmin from Sringeri, in the Chikkamagaluru district of Karnataka while mother, Sandhya, is a Sri Lankan Sinhalese. Her father worked with Hindustan Unilever in Valparai as a manager. After she did her pre-schooling in Sri Lanka, she came to India and went to Poornapragnya in Aldur, Chikmagalur and then to Nirmala Convent in Mysore. Later she continued her education at Baldwin Girls' High School in Bangalore and did graduation (B.Com.) and Post Graduation (MBA) at Mount Carmel College, Bangalore.

Pooja can speak Kannada, Sinhala, Tamil, and English.

In December 2016, she married Prashan David Vethakan, who is a Sri Lankan businessman.

== Career ==
Pooja was introduced by a friend of her to cinematographer-turned-director Jeeva, who signed her for the role of Anglo-Indian girl in his Tamil venture Ullam Ketkumae. Pooja said that at that time she planned to finish that film and return to her original job and did not take an acting career into consideration. She stated: "I said to myself I'd act in just this film, see what it's like, make good use of the money and get back to studying". She was soon offered a role opposite R. Madhavan, which she could not decline and made her rethink her decision. Ullam Ketkumae's massive delay meant that her second film, the romantic comedy Jay Jay (2004), directed by Saran, became her first official release. Pooja received favorable reviews for her performance in Jay Jay; G. Ulaganathan from Deccan Herald wrote: "Spirited, lively, Pooja's sparkling eyes and smile do leave an impression". She next played the romantic interest of Ajith Kumar in another Saran film, Attahasam, which, in spite of mixed critical response, went on to become a financial success. Pooja, too, met with criticism, with critics citing that she had "only limited role" and was "wasted [...] in an insignificant and half-baked role". Pooja's subsequent release happened to be Ullam Ketkumae that featured her in one of the five leading roles alongside Shaam, Laila, Arya and Asin. The film fetched positive remarks and emerged as a sleeper hit. She went to appear in commercial Tamil films such as Thambi and Pori. In 2007, Pooja also appeared in a Malayalam film, Panthaya Kozhi, before landing the lead female role in Bala's Naan Kadavul. Her portrayal of Hamshavalli, a blind beggar, was critically appreciated and earned her several accolades, including the Filmfare Award for Best Actress – Tamil and Tamil Nadu State Film Award for Best Female Character Artiste. Following Naan Kadavul, Pooja went on a sabbatical, appeared just in cameo roles in TN-07 AL 4777, Drohi and the Telugu film Orange.

Her big budget film Kusa Paba released in early 2012 and became the highest grosser ever in the history of Sri Lankan film industry. Critics praised Pooja for her role of Pabawathi.

== Filmography ==
=== Film ===
Year	Film	Role	Language	Notes
2003	Jay Jay	Seema	Tamil	
2004	Attahasam	Sapna	Tamil	
2005	Jithan	Priya	Tamil	
2005	Ullam Ketkumae	Irene	Tamil	
2006	Anjalika	Anjalika, Uththara	Sinhala	
2006	Thambi	Archana	Tamil	
2006	Pattiyal	Sandhya	Tamil	
2006	Thagapansamy	Marikozhundhu Shanmugam	Tamil	
2007	Pori	Pooja	Tamil	
2007	Panthaya Kozhi	Chempakam	Malayalam	
2007	Yahaluvo	Manorani	Sinhala	
2007	Asai Man Piyabanna	Ranmalee / Maleesha	Sinhala	
2007	Oram Po	Rani	Tamil	
2009	Naan Kadavul	Hamshavalli	Tamil	
2009	TN 07 AL 4777	Car driver who crashes into Gautham	Tamil	Guest appearance
2010	Suwanda Denuna Jeewithe	Rashmi	Sinhala	
2010	Drohi	Roja	Tamil	Guest appearance
2010	Orange	Meenakshi	Telugu	Guest appearance
2011	Smoking Kills	Pooja	English	Short film
2012	Kusa Paba	Pabawathi	Sinhala	
2012	Mirage	Priya	English	Short film
2013	Vidiyum Munn	Rekha	Tamil	
2015	Kadavul Paathi Mirugam Paathi		Tamil	Guest appearance
2016	Paththini	Kannagi (Paththini)	Sinhala	
2016	Sarigama	Mariya	Sinhala	
2024	Sihinayaki Adare	Jennifer Fernandez	Sinhala	
2024	Minnu		Sinhala	Guest appearance

=== Television ===
Show	Role	Language	Notes
Daskon	Princess Pramila	Sinhala	Teledrama
Derana City of Dance season 5	Judge	Sinhala	Reality show
Aatam Paatam Kondatam	Judge	Tamil	Reality show
Derana City of Dance season 6	Judge	Sinhala	Reality show
Dance Jodi Dance	Judge	Tamil	Reality show

== Awards and nominations ==
Year	Award	Category	Work	Result	Achievements
2006	Sarasaviya Awards	Most Popular Actress	Anjalika	Nominated	
2006	Sarasaviya Awards	Best Actress	Anjalika	Nominated	
2007	Sarasaviya Awards	Best Actress	Asai Man Piyabanna	Nominated	
2007	Sarasaviya Awards	Most Popular Actress	Asai Man Piyabanna	Nominated	
2009	Tamil Nadu State Film Awards	Best Supporting Actress	Naan Kadavul	Won	
2010	Filmfare Awards South	Best Actress	Naan Kadavul	Won	
2010	Vijay Awards	Best Actress	Naan Kadavul	Won	
	World Malayalee Council	Best Actress		Won	
2013	Derana Film Awards	Most Popular Actress	Kusa Pabha	Won	
2013	Derana Film Awards	Best Actress	Kusa Pabha	Nominated	
2013	Hiru Golden Film Awards	Most Popular Actress	Kusa Pabha	Nominated	
2013	Norway Tamil Film Festival Awards	Best Actress	Vidiyum Munn	Won	
2013	Ananda Vikatan Cinema Awards	Best Actress	Vidiyum Munn	Won	
2014	Filmfare Awards South	Best Actress	Vidiyum Munn	Nominated	
2014	Vijay Awards	Best Actress	Vidiyum Munn	Nominated	
2014	SIIMA - Tamil	Best Actress	Vidiyum Munn	Nominated	
	BehindWood Gold Medals	Best Actress		Won	
2016	SLIM-Nielsen Peoples Awards	Most Popular Actress		Won	
2016	Sarasaviya Awards	Best Actress	Sarigama	Won	
2017	Derana Film Awards	Most Popular Actress	Paththini	Won	
2017	Janabhimani Honorary Award			Won	Honor From Sri Lankan Government
2018	Hiru Golden Film Awards	Most Popular Actress		Won	
2019	SLIM-Nielsen Peoples Awards	Most Popular Actress		Won	
2020	SLIM-Nielsen Peoples Awards	Most Popular Actress		Won	
2021	SLIM-Nielsen Peoples Awards	Most Popular Actress		Won	
