= Narayanasamy =

Narayanasamy is a surname. Notable people with the name include:

- V. Narayanasamy (born 1947), Chief Minister of Puducherry, India, 2016 to 2021
- Puravalan Narayanasamy, Singaporean Tamil actor
- Sowmiya Narayanasamy (born 2000), Indian footballer
