= Attahasam =

- Theatrical release poster
- Directed by: Saran
- Written by: Saran
- Produced by: N. Palanisamy; Jaya Prasanth N P. Karthikeyan
- Starring: Ajith Kumar; Pooja
- Cinematography: Venkatesh Anguraj
- Edited by: Suresh Urs
- Music by: Bharadwaj
- Production company: Vijayam Cine Combines
- Distributed by: Ayngaran International
- Release date: 12 November 2004
- Running time: 157 minutes
- Country: India
- Language: Tamil

Attahasam (transl. Havoc) is a 2004 Indian Tamil-language action film written and directed by Saran. The film stars Ajith Kumar in dual roles alongside Pooja while Sujatha, Nizhalgal Ravi, Babu Antony, Karunas, and Ramesh Khanna play supporting roles. The score and soundtrack were composed by Bharadwaj with cinematography by Venkatesh Anguraj and editing by Suresh Urs. Attahasam was released on 12 November 2004.

== Plot ==
Jeeva, a driving instructor, leads a happy life with his mother. He falls in love with Swapna after several mishaps. Jeeva's mother hides the truth from her son that his father was murdered by a rowdy named Manthiram. The mother, much against Jeeva's wish, packs off his elder twin brother Guru with a family who offers to adopt him, who was a witness to the murderer from a close quarter, to a distant town. Guru runs away from the family, goes to Thoothukudi, and grows up to become a gangster there. When Jeeva visits Thoothukudi, he comes across Guru, also called Thala. Seizing the opportunity, Guru kidnaps Jeeva, and decides to go to Chennai and pass himself off as Jeeva. Initially, he plans to take revenge on his mother for giving him away at a very young age. He hurts her at every step and even plans to sell off all their property. On the other hand, Jeeva is mistaken as the gangster and is subject to attacks by the local gangsters of Thoothukudi. He escapes from them and returns to Chennai to save his mother. In the meantime, Guru learns of his father's death and that Manthiram was the cause of their fate. He avenges his father's death and leaves Jeeva to live happily with their mother and then goes to jail to keep his mother in belief that he is somewhere else living happily.

== Cast ==
- Ajith Kumar in a dual role as Thoothukudi Guru (Thala) and Jeeva
- Pooja as Swapna, Jeeva's love interest
- Sujatha as Guru's and Jeeva's mother
- Babu Antony as Manthiram
- Mahadevan as Samuthrakani Annachi
- Nizhalgal Ravi as Mayilu, Guru's and Jeeva's father
- Ilavarasan as Samuthrakani's brother-in-law
- Jasper as Fernandez
- Ramesh Khanna as Surula, Guru’s sidekick
- Karunas as Pangu
- Vaiyapuri as Kumbudren Saamy
- V. M. C. Haneefa as Swapna's father
- Ilavarasu as Driving Student's father
- Manobala as Semi Joseph
- Crane Manohar as Driving School Staff
- Scissor Manohar
- Nellai Siva as Samuthrakani's assistant
- M. S. Bhaskar as Sex Doctor
- Rajendranath as Police Officer
- Ramkumar and Lakshman as young Guru and Jeeva
- Ragasya (special appearance in the song "Therkku Cheemayile")

Uncredited

- Vellai Subbaiah
- Anu Mohan as Veterinarian

== Production ==
Saran and Ajith Kumar collaborated for the third time after the successes of Kaadhal Mannan (1998) and Amarkkalam (1999). Between then and 2004, the pair began shooting for another project for Poornachandra Rao titled Erumugam, before Ajith pulled out and the pair subsequently fell out. However Ajith's wife, former actress Shalini, played a role in reconciling the pair and they reunited for Attahasam. Kiran Rathod was initially chosen to play a second lead female role, but Saran later deleted her character from the project. Filming was kept on hold for few months as Saran got an opportunity to direct Vasool Raja MBBS.

The shooting progressed in October 2004 around Tuticorin and a scene created a ruckus among the public as they mistook the action to be real, as the region had seen similar daylight murders and fights among local mafia in the past. Songs from the film were shot in Romania and Pollachi. The film released on Diwali 2004.

== Soundtrack ==
The music was composed by Bharadwaj.

All lyrics are written by Vairamuthu.

Track listing
No.	Title	Singer(s)	Length
1.	"Therkku Cheemayile"	Mano	4:42
2.	"Pollachi Ilaneere"	Karthik, Anuradha Sriram	4:04
3.	"Nachendru Ichondru"	Srinivas, Ujjayinee Roy	4:25
4.	"Imaya Malaiyil En Kodi"	Tippu	4:33
5.	"Thala Pola Varuma"	Donnan, Arjun Thomas, Tippu	3:39
6.	"Attagasam"	Donnan, Ujaini, Tippu, Arjun Thomas	3:46
Total length:			25:09

== Release and reception ==
Despite a last minute financial crunch, Attahasam was released on 300 screens worldwide as Ajith agreed to pay a hefty amount to the producer for settling his liability to the financier. Oscar Ravichandran gave a significant amount to clear the producer’s debt in lieu of the satellite rights of the film, which in turn were sold to Jaya TV.

Visual Dasan of Kalki called Attahasam a dramatic breakthrough for Ajith. Malini Mannath wrote for Chennai Online, "Attagasam is a fun film, unpretentious and light-hearted, an enjoyable time-pass film." Sify wrote, "The director and script-writer Saran has no original story to say and just lets his maddeningly zany characters indulge in buffoonery in the name of entertainment". Deccan Herald wrote "Saran has given a light-hearted film with action, comedy and sentiment in a right mix. He could have avoided double meaning dialogues. Bharadwaj’s background score is impressive".
