= Venkatesh Anguraj =

Indian cinematographer

- Occupation: Cinematographer
- Years active: 1999–present

Venkatesh Anguraj is an Indian film cinematographer, known for his work in Tamil, Kannada, and Telugu films. He is known for his frequent collaborations with filmmakers like Saran, A. Venkatesh, Suraj, Rishab Shetty, and Santhosh Ananddram.

== Career ==
Venkatesh graduated from the Film and Television Institute of India (FTII). He started his career by assisting cinematographer R. Raghunatha Reddy on Duet, who was then a regular for K. Balachander. He made his debut in the Tamil film Amarkkalam (1999) and appeared in films such as Gemini (2002).

Regarding his work in the Kannada film Ricky (2016), a critic wrote, "Staying true to his subject, cinematographer Venkatesh Anguraj has done a fair job in capturing the natural beauty of the Western Ghats".

== Filmography ==
- Note: he was credited as A. Venkatesh from 1999 to 2014.

Year	Film	Language	Notes
1999	Amarkkalam	Tamil	
2000	Parthen Rasithen	Tamil	
2001	Paarthale Paravasam	Tamil	
2002	Alli Arjuna	Tamil	
2002	Gemini	Tamil	
2002	Gemini	Telugu	
2003	Dum	Tamil	
2003	Aahaa Ethanai Azhagu	Tamil	
2003	Jay Jay	Tamil	
2004	Kuthu	Tamil	
2004	Vasool Raja MBBS	Tamil	
2004	Attahasam	Tamil	
2004	Aai	Tamil	
2006	Idhaya Thirudan	Tamil	
2006	Parijatham	Tamil	
2006	Something Something... Unakkum Enakkum	Tamil	
2006	Vattaram	Tamil	
2007	Machakaaran	Tamil	
2008	Arasangam	Tamil	
2009	Padikkadavan	Tamil	
2009	Malai Malai	Tamil	
2010	Maanja Velu	Tamil	
2013	Ongole Githa	Telugu	
2014	Ennamo Nadakkudhu	Tamil	
2015	Endendigu	Kannada	
2016	Ricky	Kannada	
2016	Achamindri	Tamil	
2017	Raajakumara	Kannada	
2017	Pataki	Kannada	
2018	Saamy 2	Tamil	
2018	Sarkari Hi. Pra. Shaale, Kasaragodu, Koduge: Ramanna Rai	Kannada	
2019	Katha Sangama	Kannada	
2021	Yuvarathnaa	Kannada	

== External source ==
- Venkatesh Anguraj at IMDb
