= Bharadwaj (composer) =

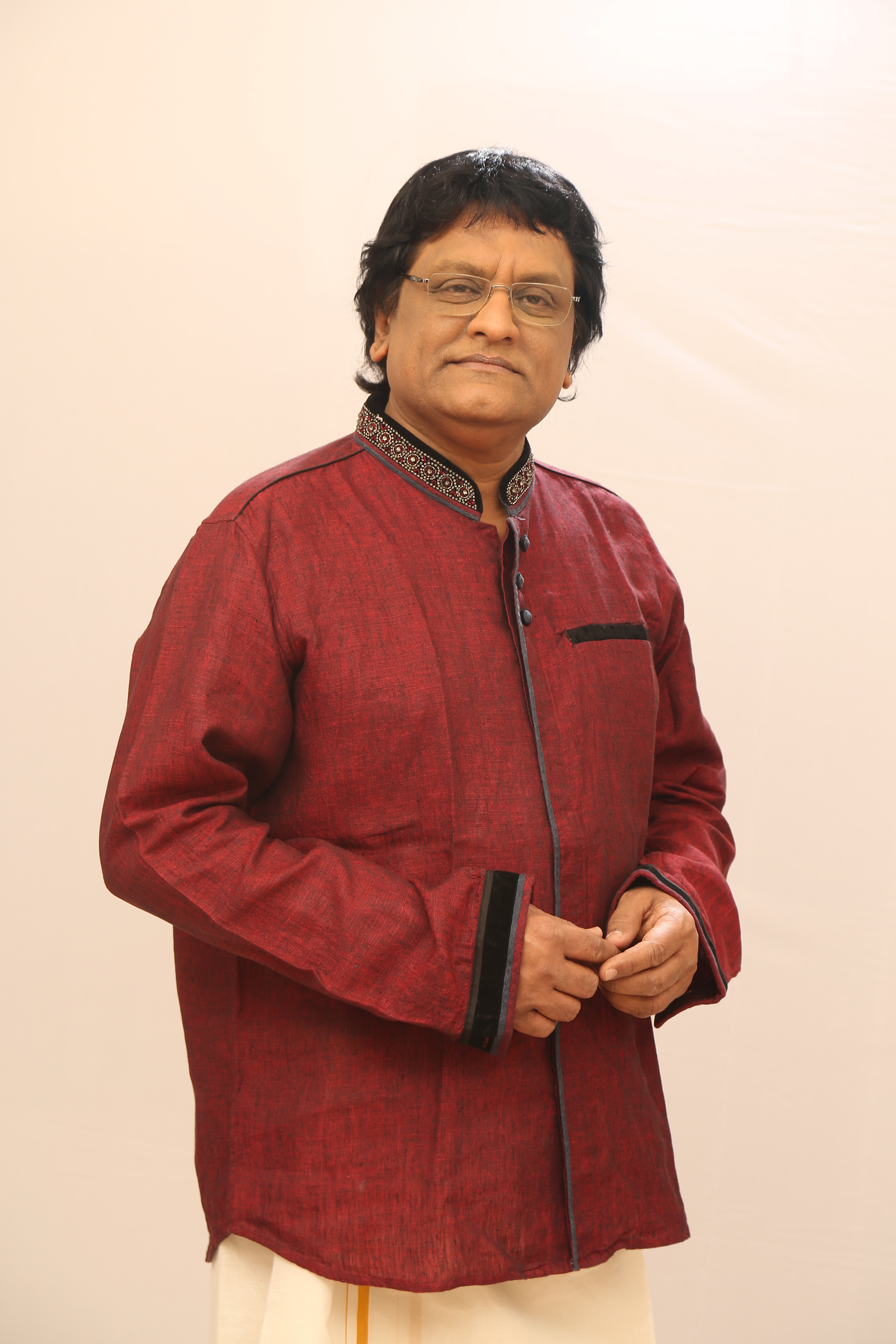

Background information
- Born: Ramani Ramaswamy; 3 July 1960 (age 66); Ravanasamudram, Tirunelveli District, India
- Genres: Film score, background score
- Occupations: Composer, music director, singer
- Years active: 1994–present

Bharadwaj is an Indian music composer and singer-songwriter, who is predominantly known for his work in Tamil cinema. He was a recipient of the Kalaimamani Award in 2008 from the Tamil Nadu State Government.

== Early life ==
Bharadwaj was born in Ravanasamudram, Tirunelveli District, Tamil Nadu, but spent his entire childhood in Delhi.

== Career ==
He started his career composing for the television series Vizhudhugal and Telugu and Kannada films. His breakthrough came with the Ajith Kumar-starring Kadhal Mannan (1998).

Bharadwaj composed the songs "Satham Illatha Thanimai Kaeten" (Amarkkalam), "Avaravar Vazhkayil" (Pandavar Bhoomi), "O Podu" (Gemini), "Apple Penney" (Roja Koottam), "Unai Naan Unai Naan" (Jay Jay), "Gnabagam Varuthey" (Autograph), "Kaadu Thirandey, "Siruchi Siruchi Vanthan" (Vasool Raja MBBS), "Oru Vaarthai Ketka" (Ayya), "Thaiyatha Thaiyatha" (Thiruttu Payale), "Meendum Palliku Pogalam" (Pallikoodam), "Margazhiyil Kuluchiparu" (Onbadhu Roobai Nottu), "Hey Dushyantha", "Totadoing" (Asal), and "Azhagazhagey" (Kalavaadiya Pozhuthugal).

Bharadwaj is famously known for his collaboration with Tamil film director Saran in a majority of their films and the director-composer duo was one of the most successful ones in Tamil film music.

== Awards ==
Bharadwaj was awarded the Filmfare Award twice, for his work on the films Gemini (2002) and Autograph (2004). He received the Kalaimamani Award in 2008 from the Tamil Nadu State Government.

His composition "Ovvavaru Pookalume" in the Tamil film Autograph won the National Award for Best Singer and Best Lyric writer in 2004.

== Discography ==
Films

- Note: ♦ indicates a remake film.

Year	Tamil film	Other language film	Notes
1995		Sogasu Chuda Taramaa? (Telugu)	Debut as composer
1996		Merupu (Telugu)	
1996		Hrudaya Kallaru (Kannada)	
1996		Pittala Dora (Telugu)	
1997		Dongaata (Telugu)	
1997		Oka Chinna Maata (Telugu)	
1997		Shruthi Hakida Hejje (Kannada)	
1998	Kaadhal Mannan		
1998	Pooveli		
1999	Rojavanam		
1999	Amarkkalam		
2000	Parthen Rasithen		
2000		Sradha (Malayalam)	
2000	Penngal		
2001	Asathal		
2001	Pandavar Bhoomi		
2002	Dhaya		
2002	Roja Kootam		
2002	Gemini		Filmfare Award for Best Music Director
2002	Raajjiyam		
2002	Thamizh		
2002	Enge Enadhu Kavithai		
2002	Jjunction		
2002	I Love You Da		25th film
2003	Kalatpadai		
2003		Neenandre Ishta (Kannada)	
2003	Anbe Anbe		
2003	Jay Jay		
2004	Autograph	My Autograph ♦ (2006; Kannada)	Filmfare Award for Best Music Director for Autograph
2004	Kadhal Dot Com		
2004	Vasool Raja MBBS		
2004	Oru Murai Sollividu		
2004		The Legend of Buddha (English)	
2004	Attahasam		
2004	Dreams		
2004	Amma Appa Chellam		
2004	Jananam		
2005	Ayya		
2005	Mannin Maindhan		
2005	Priyasakhi		
2005	February 14		
2005	Anda Naal Nyabagam		
2005	Kundakka Mandakka		
2005	Ulla Kadathal		
2006	Idhaya Thirudan		
2006	Thirupathi		
2006	Thiruttu Payale		
2006	Jambhavan		
2006	Vattaram		50th film
2007	Muni		
2007	Pirappu		
2007		No 73, Shanthi Nivasa (Kannada)	
2007	Pallikoodam		
2007	Onbadhu Roobai Nottu		
2008	Vallamai Tharayo		
2009	Naalai Namadhe		
2009	Manjal Veiyil		
2009	Solla Solla Inikkum		
2009	Kathalukku Maranamillai		No theatrical release
2010	Aasal		
2010	Kalavadiya Pozhudugal		Released in 2017
2011	Nandhi		
2014	Athithi		
2014	Aranmanai		
2014	Azhagiya Pandipuram		
2017	Aayirathil Iruvar		

Non Film Songs

Year	Film/album	Language	Song	Singer(s)	Lyrics	Audio label	Ref.
2019	Navarathriya Navavaibhava	Kannada	"Navarthriya e"	Priyadarshini, Mahesh Mahadev	Mahesh Mahadev	PM Audios	

Singer

This is a partial list of notable films in which Bharadwaj has worked as a singer.

Year	Film/album	Song	Notes
2002	Roja Koottam	"Putham Pudhu"	
2004	Attagasam	"Thala Pola"	
2004	Autograph	"Gnabagam Varuthe"	
2006	Vattaaram	"Yar Tharuvar Intha"	
2008	Vallamai Thaarayo	"Vallamai Tharayo", "Unnaithan"	
2010	Aasal	"Em Thandhai"	
