= Velmurugan Borewells =

2014 Indian film by Gopi M P

- Theatrical release poster
- Directed by: Gopi M P
- Starring: Mahesh; Ganja Karuppu; Aarushi; Ragasya
- Cinematography: Salai Sagadevan
- Edited by: A. L. Ramesh
- Music by: Srikanth Deva
- Production company: Tharun Kaanth Film Factory
- Release date: 28 November 2014
- Country: India
- Language: Tamil

Velmurugan Borewells is a 2014 Indian Tamil-language romantic comedy film directed by Gopi M P and starring Mahesh, Ganja Karuppu, Aarushi and Ragasya.

== Cast ==
- Mahesh as Ramesh
- Ganja Karuppu as Velmurugan
- Aarushi
- Ragasya as Dhanam
- IT Arasan
- Pandi
- Theepetti Ganesan
- O. A. K. Sundar
- K. P. Jagan
- Samuthirakani as Narrator
- Manobala
- Mayilsamy
- Singamuthu
- Imman Annachi
- Dindigul Alex
- Bava Lakshmanan
- Vengal Rao

== Production ==
Ganja Karuppu turned producer with this film and bought a borewell truck for the film. Aarushi, who starred in Azhagan Azhagi (2013), worked on this film alongside another unreleased Mahesh-starrer Adhithalam.

== Soundtrack ==
The music was composed by Srikanth Deva.

== Reception ==
A critic from iFlicks wrote that "Kanja Karuppu who has produced this film has done his part with good comedy. Songs are good in Srikanth Deva's music. Director M.P.Gopi gets an appreciation for filming a normal village story to a beautiful screenplay". A critic from Dinamalar noted how it was comforting that the film was not needlessly boring while also praising the acting, music and cinematography. A critic from Maalai Malar called the film funny.
