= Idhayathirudan =

2006 film directed by Saran

- Theatrical release poster
- Directed by: Saran
- Written by: Saran; Crazy Mohan (dialogue)
- Produced by: K. Balachander (Presenter); Pushpa Kandhaswamy
- Starring: Ravi Mohan; Kamna Jethmalani; Prakash Raj
- Cinematography: Venkatesh Anguraj
- Edited by: Suresh Urs
- Music by: Bharadwaj
- Production company: Kavithalayaa Productions
- Release date: 10 February 2006
- Running time: 153 minutes
- Country: India
- Language: Tamil

Idhayathirudan (Note: Alternatively spelt as Idhayaththirudan.) (transl. Heart Thief) is a 2006 Indian Tamil-language romantic action film written and directed by Saran. The film stars Ravi Mohan (credited as Jayam Ravi) and Kamna Jethmalani, while Prakash Raj, Vani Viswanath, Santhanam, Kalpana, and Nassar play supporting roles. The soundtrack was composed by Bharadwaj.

== Plot ==
A young woman posts her pictures online and emails them to a fictitious address; to her surprise, a person actually exists at the address. They meet and eventually fall in love, but a police officer poses trouble because he is interested in the girl.

== Cast ==
- Ravi Mohan as T. Mahesh/A. Mahesh
- Kamna Jethmalani as Deepika
- Prakash Raj as Mayilravanan IPS, Assistant Commissioner of Police
- Vani Viswanath as Sudha Rani IAS, Home Secretary of Tamil Nadu
- Santhanam as S. Mahesh
- Kalpana as Kamala, Mahesh's adopted mother
- Nassar as Aalwar, Mahesh's biological father
- G. Gnanasambandan as Mahesh's adopted father
- Krishna as Joseph Krishna
- Neelima Rani as Anitha, Mahesh's adopted sister
- Kaajal Pasupathi as Sun Music VJ
- Kaka Radhakrishnan as Deepika's grandfather
- Ramesh Khanna as Mayilravanan's assistant
- Madhan Bob as Head Chef
- M. S. Bhaskar
- Vaiyapuri
- Kavithalaya Krishnan
- Boys Rajan as Police inspector
- Raviraj as Professor
- Thambi Ramaiah as Police constable (uncredited role)
- Crazy Mohan as Special appearance
- Jyothirmayi as item number

== Production ==
The film was shot at locations including Chennai, Mumbai, Bangalore, Austria and Italy. The songs were shot at locations including Germany, Austria, Mumbai, Alapuzha in Kerala, and the Guindy Race Course in Chennai.

== Soundtrack ==
The soundtrack was composed by Bharadwaj. The lyrics of the songs were written by Vairamuthu.

Song	Singers	Length
"Arabia"	Janani Bharadwaj	04:52
"Unnai Thotta"	KK	04:17
"Urikka Urikka"	Ceylon Manohar, Mukesh Mohamed	04:32
"October Kaatru"	Bonnie Chakraborty, Mathangi	05:12
"Goyaango"	Anuradha Sriram	04:27
"Uchathai"	Bharadwaj, Rekha Rajan, Petrina Kow, Denise Tan, Subiksha, Kavitha, Arjun Thomas, Donan	04:06

== Critical reception ==
Malathi Rangarajan of The Hindu wrote, "The story meanders in rudderless fashion before suddenly waking up to an action-packed climax". Malini Mannath of Chennai Online wrote, "A disjointed script, weakly etched characters, lackluster narration and some poor performances make viewing 'Idhayathirudan' a test of one's patience". G. Ulaganathan of Deccan Herald wrote, "It is said to be a love story with a difference but the script is poor and there are too many duumy characters like Nasser who is supposed to be a don in hiding. [..] Saran could developed the story interestingtly but loses grip".
