= Dhamu =

Indian actor

- Born: A.V. Dhamodaran; 31 August 1965 (age 61); Madras, Tamil Nadu, India
- Occupations: Actor, Comedian, mimicry artist
- Years active: 1992–2014
- Spouse: Suganthi
- Children: 2

Dhamu (born A. V. Dhamodaran) on August 31, 1965 is a former Indian actor, comedian and mimicry artist who mainly acted in Tamil films. He is known for his role as Otteri Nari in Ghilli (2004).

== Career ==
Dhamu was a part of Gaana Galata Group, a popular touring and acting comedy troupe. Since then, he has appeared in several films. He has quit mainstream acting and has opened an agency to represent comedy shows known as 'Tamarai Bharani Comedy Agency'. He once hosted a program "Kalakkal Comedy" on Sun TV. He worked as assistant to the former Indian President A. P. J. Abdul Kalam for seven years. He was also a children's education advocate.

== Filmography ==
Actor

Year	Title	Role	Ref.
1992	Vaaname Ellai	Chevvaa	
1992	Naalaiya Theerpu	Dhamu	
1993	Jaathi Malli	Dhamu	
1994	Duet	Beggar	
1994	Kaadhalan	Prabhu's friend	
1994	Mani Rathnam		Uncredited role
1994	Pudhiya Mannargal	Satyamoorthy's friend	
1994	Sindhu Nathi Poo	Soori	
1995	Aanazhagan		
1995	Baashha	Dhamu	
1995	Aasai	Jeeva's friend	
1996	Vaanmathi	Mimicry artist	
1996	Avathara Purushan		
1996	Vetri Mugam		
1997	Love Today	Siva	
1997	Nerrukku Ner	Dhamu	
1997	Aahaa..!	Cook	
1997	Ullaasam	A peon	
1997	Kadhalukku Mariyadhai	Raghavan	
1997	Pagaivan	Prabhu's friend	
1998	Kaadhal Mannan	A person in the mansion	
1998	Vettu Onnu Thundu Rendu		
1998	Sollamale	Shanmugam	
1998	Thulli Thirintha Kaalam	Dhamu	
1998	Gol Mall	Dhamu	
1998	Aval Varuvala	James Thomson	
1999	Mugham		
1999	Thullatha Manamum Thullum	Madhan	
1999	Ninaivirukkum Varai	Janakiraman's friend	
1999	Endrendrum Kadhal	Vasu	
1999	Rojavanam		
1999	Poovellam Kettuppar	Dhamu	
1999	Kanave Kalayadhe	Selvam	
1999	Chinna Raja		
1999	Amarkkalam	Thilak	
1999	Jodi	Kannan's friend	
1999	Time		
1999	Suyamvaram	Patient	
1999	Manam Virumbuthe Unnai	Sabapathy	
1999	Aasaiyil Oru Kaditham	Sundaralingam	
2000	Kannukkul Nilavu	Chandra	
2000	Vetri Kodi Kattu		Special appearance in the song "Sirippu Varudhu Sirippu Varudhu"
2000	Karisakattu Poove		
2000	Appu	Dhamu	
2000	Unnai Kodu Ennai Tharuven	Mustafa	
2000	Parthen Rasithen	Vellaisamy	
2000	Anbudan	Sathya's friend	
2001	Ullam Kollai Poguthae	Thamizharasan	
2001	Piriyadha Varam Vendum	Sanjay's friend	
2001	Paarvai Ondre Pothume	Gopal	
2001	Sonnal Thaan Kaadhala		
2001	Love Channel	Wilfred De Souza	
2001	Badri	Howrah	
2001	Pennin Manathai Thottu	Dhamu	
2001	Chocklet	Dhamu	
2001	Paarthale Paravasam		
2002	Alli Arjuna	Kamatchi	
2002	Dhaya	Thotti Siva	
2002	Punnagai Desam	Vijay	
2002	Gemini	Ram	
2002	Enge Enadhu Kavithai	Senthil	
2002	Arputham	Arivazhagan	
2002	Kadhal Azhivathillai	Ravishankar's PA	
2003	Anbu	Paari	
2003	Aahaa Ethanai Azhagu	Rickshaw driver	
2003	Alaudin	Alaudin's friend	
2003	Military	Azhagesan	
2003	Jay Jay	Oosi	
2004	Sound Party		
2004	Jai	College Student	
2004	Ghilli	Otteri Nari	
2004	Maanasthan	Selvarasu's friend	
2005	Gurudeva		
2005	Amudhae	Dinakar's friend	
2006	Aathi	Auto driver	
2006	Thodamaley		50th film
2007	Pokkiri	Juice shop owner	
2007	Sivaji: The Boss	Mimicry artist	
2008	Thotta		
2008	Pattaya Kelappu	Saamy	
2008	Pandhayam		
2009	Villu	VJ	
2009	Perumal		
2010	Rasikkum Seemane	Police officer	
2011	En Ullam Unnai Theduthe		
2012	Ooh La La La		
2014	Eera Veyyil	Velu	

Dubbing artist

- Vagai Chandrasekhar - Rasamagan

Singer

- "Stella Maris Laara" - Badri
