= Kiran Rathod =

Indian content creator and actress from Tamil Industry

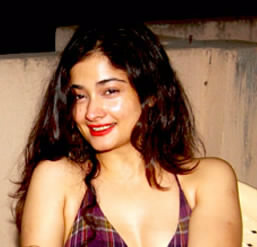
- Born: 11 January 1981 (age 45); Jaipur, Rajasthan, India
- Other name: Gemini Kiran
- Occupations: Actress; content creator
- Years active: 2001–present (actress)
- Relatives: Raveena Tandon (cousin)

Kiran Rathod (born 11 January 1981) is an Indian actress and adult content creator. She is well known for her appearance in Tamil films.

== Early life ==
Kiran Rathod was born on 11 January 1981 in Jaipur. She is a cousin of actress Raveena Tandon. Rathod graduated with a degree in Arts from Mithibai College in Mumbai. After college she got into modelling and worked in a few Hindi pop albums.

== Career ==
Rathod made her debut in the film industry with the Hindi film Yaadein in 2001, directed by Subhash Ghai and featuring Hrithik Roshan and Kareena Kapoor in lead roles.

In 2002, she ventured into Tamil cinema with the film Gemini (2002), where she starred alongside Vikram. The film, directed by Saran, gained significant success and is credited with revitalising the Tamil film industry. She was part of the Tamil cult-classic Anbe Sivam (2003), sharing the screen with Kamal Haasan under direction of Sundar C.

Known for her charm and screen presence, Kiran enjoyed a brief period as a leading actress, receiving multiple offers during that time. However, her stint as a leading lady didn’t last long, and she later transitioned to supporting roles.

In 2023, she participated in the reality show Big Boss Telugu Season 7.

== Filmography ==
Key
†	Denotes films that have not yet been released

Year	Film	Role	Language	Notes	Ref.
2001	Yaadein	Monishka Rai	Hindi	Debut Hindi film	
2002	Nuvvu Leka Nenu Lenu	Anjali	Telugu		
2002	Gemini	Manisha Natwarlal	Tamil	Debut Tamil film	
2002	Sreeram	Herself	Telugu	Special appearance in the song "Pedavullo Pepsicola"	
2002	Jaani Dushman: Ek Anokhi Kahani	Rashmi Sharma	Hindi		
2002	Thandavam	Meenakshi	Malayalam	Dubbed into Tamil as Erumugam	
2002	Villain	Lavanya	Tamil		
2003	Anbe Sivam	Balasaraswathi alias Bala	Tamil		
2003	Arasu	Herself	Tamil	Special appearance in the song "Aalaana Dehgam Engum"	
2003	Parasuram	Anjali	Tamil	Dubbed into Telugu as Police Karthavyam	
2003	Thennavan	Divya	Tamil	Dubbed into Telugu as Election Commissioner	
2003	Diwan	Geetha	Tamil	Dubbed into Telugu as Rudra Simham	
2003	Winner	Neelaveni	Tamil		
2003	Thirumalai	Jakkamma	Tamil	Special appearance in the song "Vaadiyamma Jakkamma"	
2004	New	Sivagami Maami	Tamil		
2004	Naani	Herself	Telugu	Guest appearance	
2004	Andaru Dongale Dorikite	Naveena	Telugu		
2004	Cheppave Chirugali	Herself	Telugu	Special appearance in the song "Papa Puthota"	
2005	Chinna	Herself	Tamil	Special appearance in the song "Bailare Bailare"	
2006	Bhagyalakshmi Bumper Draw	Ranikasula Renuka Rani	Telugu		
2006	Souten: The Other Woman	Sapna R. Singh	Hindi		
2006	Saawan... The Love Season	Herself	Hindi		
2006	Thimiru	Herself	Tamil	Special appearance in the song "Maana Madura"	
2006	Idhu Kadhal Varum Paruvam	Manasi	Tamil		
2007	Kshana Kshana	Maya	Kannada	Debut Kannada film	
2008	Mayakazhcha	Aswathy Narendran	Malayalam		
2008	Vasool	Kiran	Tamil	Dubbed into Telugu as Vasool Rani	
2009	Rajadhi Raja	Herself	Tamil	Special appearance in the song "Kandha Kadambha Kathiresa"	
2009	Naalai Namadhe	Sarasu	Tamil		
2010	Jaggubhai	Sumathi	Tamil		
2010	High School	Saraswathi	Telugu	Dubbed into Tamil as Valibame Vaa	
2010	Guru Sishyan	Herself	Tamil	Special appearance in the song "Kettele Inge"	
2011	Manushyamrugam	Lisy	Malayalam	Dubbed into Tamil as Police Rajyam	
2011	Be Careful	Kiran	Hindi		
2011	Gun	Herself	Kannada	Special appearance in the song "Yenne Yaaru"	
2011	Doubles	Herself	Malayalam	Special appearance	
2012	Saguni	Vasundhara Devi	Tamil		
2012	Ata Pata Laapata	Reporter	Hindi		
2013	Kevvu Keka	Mrs.Gottam Gopalakrishna/ Jaanu	Telugu		
2014	Maanikya	Herself	Kannada	Special appearance in the song "Pantara Panta"	
2015	Aambala	Chinnaponnu	Tamil	Dubbed into Telugu as Maga Maharaju	
2016	Muthina Kathirikai	Madhavi	Tamil		
2016	Ilamai Oonjal	Herself	Tamil	Dubbed in Telugu as Bhaja Bhajantrilu and in Kannada as Sikkapatte Ishtapatte	
2025	Mrs & Mr	Rupini	Tamil	Special appearance in the song "Siva Rathiri"	

== Award ==
Year	Film	Award	Category	Result	Ref.
2002	Gemini	Cinema Express Awards	Best New Face Actress	Won	

== Television ==
Year	Programme / Show	Role	Language	Channel	Notes
2023	Big Boss Telugu Season 7	Contestant	Telugu	Star Maa	Evicted Day 7
2025	Top Cooku Dupe Cooku season 2	Contestant	Tamil	Sun TV	3rd Runner-Up
