= Jay Jay =

- Poster
- Directed by: Saran
- Written by: Saran
- Produced by: V. Ravichandran
- Starring: R. Madhavan; Amogha; Pooja
- Cinematography: A. Venkatesh
- Edited by: Suresh Urs
- Music by: Bharadwaj
- Production company: Aascar Film Pvt. Ltd
- Release date: 14 November 2003
- Running time: 164 minutes
- Country: India
- Language: Tamil

Jay Jay is a 2003 Indian Tamil-language romantic comedy film written and directed by Saran. The film stars R. Madhavan, Amogha and Pooja, while Kalabhavan Mani, Charle, Dhamu and Malavika Avinash also play key supporting roles. Produced by V. Ravichandran of Oscar Films, the film had music scored by Bharadwaj and is based on Hollywood film Serendipity.

== Plot ==
Jagan (R. Madhavan) is a carefree youth who stays with his friends in a room. He plays violin well and seeks every opportunity to help others, at the same time benefitting himself. His father (Delhi Ganesh) is an assistant of an unsuccessful politician, who works for two politician brothers. Their sister, Seema (Pooja), has a crush on Jagan after he saves her from some goons. On the other hand, is Jamuna (Amogha). Jamuna is a very beautiful young woman who is from Kolkata. Her father is very protective of her. Jagan spots her at a book store and falls for her instantly only to be beaten up by her father shortly afterwards. Jamuna apologises to Jagan. Jagan, unable to forget her, goes to the bookstore again in hopes of seeing her. Jamuna buys a book, kisses it and starts writing her name, only to be interrupted by Jagan. Jagan only knows her name starts with J. They have a cup of coffee and Jagan shares his interest in marrying her. Jamuna, who deeply believes in destiny, writes her name and address in a 100rs bill and tells Jagan that if either of them get hold of the bill by 1 year, she would marry him. She then pays the waiter. When Jagan goes to the waiter to take back the bill, it is given away. Jamuna goes back to Kolkata and Jagan is lost. Jagan starts looking for the bill and his friends help him. Jamuna, who is in Kolkata get a proposal from her family friend, Guna(Shasikumar). She remembers Jagan's proposal and realises she has fallen in love with him. She also looks for the bill with the help of her cousin, Meera (Malavika Avinash).

Under spam circumstances, Jagan gets engaged to Seema who later realises the truth about Jagan look in for Jamuna. Jamuna gets hold of the bill while eating Pani Puri but the money is snatched by a petty thief. She breaks down and upon seeing this, Meera scolds her of abandoning Jagan in Chennai.

Seema gets hold of the book bought by Jamuna, who purposely leaves it at the cafe where they both met, in hopes it might reach Jagan. Seema gives it to Jagan who finds that Jamuna is from Bengal after seeing Bengali words in it. Jagan goes to Kolkata and Jamuna goes to Chennai with Meera, to confess to Jagan. Their trains cross each other at Vizag yet, they fail to meet. When in Kolkata, Jagan fails to find Jamuna. In Chennai, Jamuna finds Jagan's house. It is revealed that Meera is Jagan's friend as Jagan's sister and Meera share the same hostel. When Jamuna is left alone in Jagan's home, his father introduces another boy as Jagan. Jamuna leaves for Kolkata disappointed. After she leaves, the boy tells Meera the truth. She quickly informs Jamuna. But when she meets Jagan's father, his father tells her that he lied, fearing Jagan's life under the hands of the politician brothers.

Meera goes to Kolkata and tells Jamuna, who breaks down. In Chennai, Jagan finds the note. He happily tells Seema and her brothers oppose it. Meera and Jamuna comes to Chennai, and Guna sacrifices his love. Jagan learns that Jamuna is coming to Chennai. Seema's elder brother confronts him but her second elder brother happily wishes Jagan.

Jamuna and Jagan meet at the coffee shop again and unite.

== Cast ==
- R. Madhavan as Jagan alias Jay
- Priyanka Kothari as Jamuna (Credited as Amogha)
- Pooja as Seema
- Charle as MLA Sattamuthu, Politician
- Dhamu as Oosi
- Kalabhavan Mani as KTM, Jagan's friend
- Malavika Avinash as Meera, Jamuna's sister
- Delhi Ganesh as Jagan's father
- Thalaivasal Vijay as Jamuna's father
- Sashikumar as Guna, Moorthy's brother
- Manobala as Moorthy, Jamuna's family friend
- Balu Anand as Hostel Warden
- Ceylon Manohar as Parasuram, Seema's elder brother
- Sundar Raj as Politician
- Adithya Menon as Sivaram, Seema's younger brother
- Thennavan as Karuppatti, Parasuram's Henchman
- Reema Sen as item number (special appearance)
- Suchitra as herself (special appearance)
- George Maryan as a Marriage Hall Worker (uncredited)

== Production ==
In late 2000, producer Ravichandran signed on Saran to make a film titled J!J! with Vijay in dual lead roles as the characters Jaishankar and Jesudas. The team were also ready to approach Aishwarya Rai to play the lead role, before the venture was shelved and the producer and director moved on to make a different film with the same title. R. Madhavan was signed on and the film was later titled Jay Jay, after the two lead characters Jagan and Jamuna. The film was said to feature Mandira Bedi in the lead role, though she was later left out for unknown reasons. Then Saran wanted to cast Simran for the role as they worked together before. But her unavailability led him to find another actress for the cast. Priyanka Kothari made her debut in the film under the stage name of Amogha, while the film also marked the debut of another heroine, Pooja, who had already signed up to feature in Jeeva's Ullam Ketkumae at the time. Thappu Thaalangal Sundar Raj, a popular Kannada actor, returned to the Tamil screen after a gap of 15 years, while Ceylon Manohar also too returned to acting after 23 years and played the main villain. Malavika Avinash of Anni fame and Giri from the Sahana serial also made their entry into the big screen, with Giri playing the role of Madhavan's friend. Bengali actress Sharmila Ghosh was also in the cast. Reemma Sen, shot at the Visakhapatnam Railway Station with 40 models from Mumbai for a song in the film. Two further songs were picturised in Greece, with the team conducting shoots in the island of Milos and at Santornini. A week's shoot was also held at the Institute for the Dumb and Deaf at Ramavaram, while multiple locations in Kolkata were chosen to depict a sequence in the city.

== Soundtrack ==
The soundtrack was composed by Bharadwaj, with lyrics by Vairamuthu. The audio was launched on 2 October 2003 at Sathyam Cinemas with K. Balachander and Kamal Haasan gracing the event. The songs "Unnai Naan" and "Kadhal Mazhaiye" became popular. The song "May Maasam" was the first venture of Suchitra as a playback singer.

Track listing
No.	Title	Singer(s)	Length
1.	"Unnai Naan"	Hariharan	5:01
2.	"Unnai Ninaikave"	Reshmi	4:41
3.	"Kaadhal Mazhaiye"	Srinivas	4:35
4.	"Pengal Nenjai"	Mahalakshmi Iyer, KK	4:24
5.	"Jee Boomba"	Bonnie Chakraborty	5:31
6.	"May Maasam"	Suchitra	4:55
Total length:			29:07

== Release and reception ==
The film was originally slated to release on Deepavali but its release was postponed due to the presence of other releases on same day. The film's plans to release on 7 November also failed and it eventually released on 14 November. The film opened to mixed reviews, with Malathi Rangarajan from The Hindu noting "Saran seems to have been carried away by the protracted route of the 100-rupee note and the hide and seek game between the lovers that he lets his screenplay go haywire". Karthiga Rukmanykanthan of Daily News noted, "The movie also reminds of Kadhal Kottai at many instances but Jay Jay has not made itself as poignant as this movie. The costumes and the music are the only consolation for the producer of this boring and fruitless movie". A critic from Deccan Herald wrote that "Music, songs and Madhavan’s performance are the highlights of the movie". Visual Dasan of Kalki wrote hats off to director for creating fantasy characters, but with real emotions that stick to the mind without any pretense. Chennai Online wrote "Charan has done a fairly good job on re-working 'My Best Friend's Wedding', turning it into a fairly enjoyable 'Parthen Rasithen'. This time the director has had to work on 'Serendipity' and 'Training Day' too (for the Pooja-Madhavan track). And blending these two films of different genres into one film is indeed a tough task! What keeps the film going are Madhavan's lively performance and the numerous twists and turns that prevent the hero and heroine from meeting and uniting". Indiainfo wrote "Madhavan has delivered another disappointing fare. JJ or JAY is rehashed from Hollywood hit SERENDIPITY. But the original had its moments and believable characters. This film lacks those essentially. One can’t understand why the talented Madhavan has been selecting films that don’t suit to his image".

Despite the mixed reviews, the film ran for seventy five days across Chennai. The film was later dubbed and released under the same name in Telugu by producers Seetharam Reddy and Hema Babu.
