= Vasool Raja MBBS =

- Poster
- Directed by: Saran
- Screenplay by: Crazy Mohan (dialogues)
- Based on: Munna Bhai M.B.B.S. by Rajkumar Hirani
- Starring: Kamal Haasan; Prabhu; Sneha; Prakash Raj
- Cinematography: A. Venkatesh
- Edited by: Suresh Urs
- Music by: Bharadwaj
- Production company: Gemini Film Circuit
- Distributed by: Raaj Kamal Films International
- Release date: 14 August 2004
- Running time: 148 minutes
- Country: India
- Language: Tamil

Vasool Raja MBBS (transl. Collection King MBBS) is a 2004 Indian Tamil-language comedy drama film directed by Saran. It is a remake of the 2003 Hindi film Munna Bhai M.B.B.S.. The film stars Kamal Haasan in the title role, while Prabhu, Sneha, Prakash Raj, Nagesh, Rohini Hattangadi, Jayasurya, Malavika, Crazy Mohan, Lakshmi Bhaskaran and Karunas play supporting roles. It revolves around a gangster enrolling in a medical college and defying its norms, while the dean seeks to remove him. The film was released on 14 August 2004 and became a success.

== Plot ==
Rajaraman, nicknamed "Vasool Raja," is a local don in Chennai who makes a living by extorting money from people with the help of his right-hand man, Vatti. Given that his father, Sriman Venkataraman, had wished for him to be a doctor, he creates the faux Venkataraman Charitable Hospital, and pretends to live in accordance with this wish.

One year later, Raja's plan goes awry when Venkataraman meets an old acquaintance, Dr. Vishwanathan. The two men decide to get Raja married to Vishwanathan's daughter, Dr. Janaki, aka "Paapu." At this point, the truth about Raja is revealed. Vishwanathan insults Raja's parents and ridicules them for being ignorant of Raja's real life. Venkataraman and Kasturi, who are both aghast and heartbroken, disown Raja and leave for their village. Raja decides that the only way to redeem himself and gain revenge for the humiliation suffered by his father is to become a real doctor. He goes to a medical college to obtain an MBBS degree.

With the help of Vatti and others, Raja gains admission to the SLR Institute of Medical Sciences. Upon admission, he again encounters Vishwanathan, who is the college dean. His success there becomes dependent upon the coerced help of Margabandhu, a faculty member of the college. While Raja's skills as a medical doctor are minimal, he transforms those around him with the "Kattipudi Vaithiyam" ("hugging therapy"), a method of comfort taught to Raja by his mother. Despite the school's emphasis on mechanical, impersonal, and often bureaucratic relationships between doctors and patients, Raja constantly seeks to impose a more empathetic regimen. To this end, he defies all convention by treating a brain-dead man Anand as if the man were able to perceive and understand normally.

Vishwanathan, who perceives all this as symptoms of chaos, is unable to prevent it from expanding and gaining ground at his college. He becomes increasingly irritable, almost to the point of insanity. Meanwhile, Janaki becomes increasingly fond of Raja, who, in his turn, becomes unreservedly infatuated with her. Vishwanathan tries several times to expel Raja, but is often outsmarted by him.

Margabandhu's senile father is admitted to the hospital, and all hope seems lost for him. Having threatened Margabandhu before, Raja's gang knows that he is a passionate board game player, and Raja orders a carrom board to come to the hospital. Raja and his gang play carrom, and Margabandhu's father miraculously wakes up and walks to the board. Raja and Margabandhu's father play against each other, and Margabandhu's father wins the match and celebrates.

Upon recovery, Vishwanathan orders Raja to leave and brings police to throw him out, but everyone in the college protests and blocks the way. Vishwanathan tells the students the truth about Raja, but no one believes him. Vishwanathan promises to retain Raja if he answers all questions asked by the doctors in front of the entire university, a challenge Raja accepts. Despite preparing well, he is unable to focus as patient Zakir's condition becomes worse and he dies in Raja's hands.

The next morning, Raja starts answering the questions well, but Vishwanathan stops the staff and says he will ask all the forthcoming questions. Raja is unable to answer and is shamed into leaving the college. He confesses the truth to everyone. Everyone except Vishwanathan is moved to tears by his speech. Immediately following Raja's departure, Anand miraculously awakens from his vegetative state; Janaki criticises her father for having banished Raja. Vishwanathan eventually realises his folly.

Raja later marries Janaki while also reconciling with his parents.

== Cast ==
- Kamal Haasan as Rajaraman Venkatraman / Vasool Raja
- Prabhu as Vatti
- Sneha as Dr. V. Janaki "Paapu"
- Prakash Raj as Dr. Vishwanathan
- Nagesh as Venkatraman
- Lakshmi as Janaki's mother
- Rohini Hattangadi as Kasturi Venkatraman
- Crazy Mohan as Professor Margabandhu
- Jayasurya as Zakir
- Malavika as Priya
- Karunas as Kalaialangaram
- Arun as the dejected lover
- Ajay Rathnam as Medicine Professor
- Kavithalayaa Krishnan as Surgery Professor
- Nithin Sathya as Neelakandan
- Chitra Lakshmanan as Dr. Kalidas
- Thalaivasal Vijay as Doctor
- Santhana Bharathi as Gangadharan
- Kaka Radhakrishnan as Margabandhu's father
- Madhan Bob as Mani Raja, Raja's client
- Vaiyapuri as Piles Patient
- E. Ramdoss as Ward Boy
- Karate Raja as Raja's sidekick
- Sukumar as Raja's sidekick
- Sampath Ram as Raja's sidekick
- Meera Krishnan as Mani Raja's wife
- A. K. Veerasamy as Hospital Cleaner
- Kaajal Pasupathi as Nurse
- Boys Rajan as Professor
- Mythili as Nurse
- Yatin Karyekar as Anand, the Coma Patient
- Benjamin as Pickpocket
- Scissor Manohar as Coconut seller
- Rathina Sabapathy as Swaminathan, Raja's classmate
- Raviraj as Doctor
- Ragasya as dancer in song "Cheena Thaana"

== Production ==
=== Development ===
Manohar Prasad of Gemini Film Circuit bought the remake rights of Munna Bhai MBBS to make it in Tamil and assigned Saran as director with Kamal Haasan in lead. Saran who was making Attahasam at that time was assigned to commence the film within 15 days and to complete and release the film within three months after consulting Ajith Kumar who gave permission to do this film. To commence the film within 15 days, Saran assigned his usual crew consisting of music composer Bharadwaj and cinematographer A. Venkatesh. Suresh Urs worked as editor while Mohana Mahendra was chosen to handle art. The film was initially titled Market Raja MBBS which Saran later used as the title for his 2019 film. It was dialogue writer Crazy Mohan who suggested the title Vasool Raja MBBS. The project began as a bilingual venture in Tamil and Telugu, though later the Telugu version was made separately with a different cast as Shankar Dada M.B.B.S. (2004).

=== Casting ===
Jyothika was initially approached to be the lead actress but her other commitments meant that the team sought and consequently signed on Sneha. Prakash Raj asked Saran if he could play the college dean, and was immediately cast. Saran initially thought of casting Karunas in the role of Vatti, later played by Prabhu, but later created a new character for Karunas. Saran had hoped to sign on director K. Balachander to play Haasan's father, with the veteran director being both Haasan's and Saran's film industry mentor. However Balachandar was reluctant to act, and the team then considered K. Viswanath and Girish Karnad for the role, before signing Nagesh. Yatin Karyekar and Rohini Hattangadi, who were part of the Hindi original, reprised their roles. Dhanush initially agreed to play the cancer patient but opted out citing a busy schedule, and was replaced by Malayalam actor Jayasurya, which also marked the latter's second Tamil film after En Mana Vaanil (2002). Crazy Mohan, besides writing the dialogues, also played a college professor.

=== Filming ===
Filming began in mid-May 2004. Saran observed Prakash Raj using hand gestures a lot while emoting so to capitalise on that, he created a "back and forth scene" focusing on his and Haasan's actions and was shot using close-up lenses. The song "Kalakkapovathu Yaaru" was shot on a set at Kushaldas Gardens. Two songs were shot in Switzerland. The film's producers, after watching the film's final cut, were dissatisfied as they felt the director did not remain faithful to the original material but Saran convinced them this version will be responded well by audiences.

== Soundtrack ==
The soundtrack was composed by Bharadwaj who collaborated with Haasan for first time. All songs were penned by Vairamuthu. A part of the song "Alwarpettai Aandava" is set in Kapi raga. The audio launch was held in July 2004. Mohan Thambirajah of New Straits Times rated the album 3.5 out of 5 and wrote, "Bharadwaj comes up with great compositions in this outing".

Track listing
No.	Title	Singer(s)	Length
1.	"Sakalakala Doctor"	Bharadwaj, Arjun, Donan	4:31
2.	"Kalakapovathu Yaaru"	Kamal Haasan, Sathyan, VNB	4:37
3.	"Alwarpetai Aandava"	Kamal Haasan, VNB	5:13
4.	"Kaddu Thirande Kidakinrathu"	Hariharan, Sadhana Sargam	4:14
5.	"Cheena Thana (Siruchi)"	Grace Karunas	4:38
6.	"Pathukulle Number"	KK, Shreya Ghoshal	5:19
Total length:			28:62

== Reception ==
=== Critical response ===
Shobha Warrier of Rediff.com wrote, "Vasool Raja is Kamal's show all the way. He does comedy, dances wonderfully, sings, and also does some great stunts. What more can people ask for by way of entertainment?". Visual Dasan of Kalki wrote that the Kamal Haasan-Charan combo got a doctorate in laughing medicine for Tamil fans who were left irritated with masala films. However Malini Mannath of Chennai Online gave a negative review, citing "Munnabhai...' was a laugh-riot, 'Vasoolraja...' hardly tickles!." Malathi Rangarajan of The Hindu wrote, "When a flick is remade comparisons are inevitable. And generally the original would invariably seem better. It is so with "Vasool Raja ... " too, though not entirely".

K. N. Vijiyan of New Straits Times wrote, "Vasoolraja MBBS (King of Revenue) should live up to its name". Sify wrote, "Munnabhai MBBS's strongest assets were its screenplay and dialogues but here Crazy Mohan’s dialogues are not so funny. The script of Vasoolraja goes awry post interval as a layer of emotional corniness begins to set in and the two songs shot in Switzerland could have easily been done away with in this otherwise smoothly paced fun flick. The songs tuned by Bharadwaj are a major let down". G. Ulaganathan of Deccan Herald wrote "While the first half is a racy entertainer, the second half drags. Songs are quite boring and music is nothing to write about".

=== Box office ===
Made on a budget of ₹5.5 crore, Vasool Raja MBBS was sold for ₹1 crore in Coimbatore distribution territory with 20 prints. The film was shown on about 285 screens worldwide to highly positive reception and box-office success. Tabloid reported 10 million tickets were sold worldwide.

== Controversy ==
The film's release faced a roadblock as a petition filed by the then Tamil Nadu Medical Council President K. R. Balasubramanian stated that the film's title ridiculed the medical profession and tarnished the image of the medical fraternity. The Madras High Court later cleared the film's release without the title changed.

== Impact ==
In 2009, some aspiring teachers were caught cheating in examinations, which the Madras High Court judge K. Chandru felt emulated the plot of Vasool Raja MBBS. Haasan refused to hold the film accountable, telling the court, "We only borrow what we see in society as we have a dearth of stories. So don't blame us".
