= Alli Arjuna =

- Directed by: Saran
- Written by: Saran
- Produced by: Chandraleela Bharathiraja
- Starring: Manoj Bharathiraja; Richa Pallod
- Cinematography: A. Venkatesh
- Edited by: Suresh Urs
- Music by: A. R. Rahman
- Production company: Janani Art Creations
- Release date: 14 January 2002
- Running time: 148 minutes
- Country: India
- Language: Tamil

Alli Arjuna is 2002 Indian Tamil-language Comedy drama film directed by Saran. The film stars Manoj Bharathiraja and Richa Pallod, while Preetha Vijayakumar, Karan, Dhamu, Charle, Vinu Chakravarthy and Jai Ganesh play supporting roles. The music was composed by A. R. Rahman with cinematography by A. Venkatesh and editing by Suresh Urs. The film was released on 14 January 2002.

== Plot ==
Arivazhagan (Manoj Bharathiraja) is from Chennai and has grown up to be a good-for-nothing fellow because of the neglect and ill-treatment by the hands of his rich parents Anbu (Jai Ganesh) and Usha (Fathima Babu). Despite being a border-mark graduate, his only aim in life is to be an irritant to his father. The entire family goes to Bangalore to attend the marriage of Savitri (Richa Pallod) in Bangalore, and when the groom disappears, Arivu offers to take his place. The families agree, and Arivu waits for Savitri on the wedding stage. But Savitri also elopes, and Arivu feels betrayed. Months later, Savitri shows up at Arivu's house later, asking him to give her refuge. When he moves out of the house to take up residence with his friends, she follows him there too. Initially irritated by her, Arivu realizes that he is gradually falling in love with her.

Meanwhile, the friends learn more about Savitri's wedding. A year before the wedding, Nisha (Preetha Vijayakumar), an accountant in Chennai, reveals to her friend Savitri that she asks for help to arrange her wedding. Savitri convinces Nisha's brother Kishore (Karan), and Nisha's wedding is hastily arranged. But two days before the wedding, Nisha becomes a victim of sexual assault. She comes home, and out of shame commits suicide by immolation. Nisha's mother tries to save her and gets severely burned. Nisha's brother Kishore (Karan), starts to fervently search for the molester. When Savitri was recovering from the loss of her friend, Kumar's family came to propose to her. Savitri decided to teach him a lesson, and blackmailed him at the last moment to leave his own wedding.

One day, Arivu lands up in Kishore's house when he follows Savitri, and he is shocked to know that Nisha is Kishore's deceased sister. The reason he became shocked is he was responsible for her death and cries in an outburst. However, Kishore does not know this, and he advises Arivu to succeed in his love towards Savitri. He send drops Arivu, but Arivu's former friend Paan Kumar (Mahanadhi Shankar) tells Kishore that he sexually assaulted his sister. Hence, Kishore chases Arivu and beats him mercilessly with rage. Just as Kishore is about to kill Arivu in the same way that his sister died (i.e. immolation), Savitri and her parents intervene the fight, and Arivu is forgiven and saved. The film unfortunately ends with a sad note as Arivu is not united with Savitri and walks out.

== Cast ==
- Manoj Bharathiraja as Arivazhagan (Arivu)
- Richa Pallod as Savithri (Saavi)
- Preetha Vijayakumar as Nisha (guest appearance)
- Karan as Kishore
- Jai Ganesh as Anbu, Arivazhagan's father
- Nizhalgal Ravi as Savithri's father
- Vinu Chakravarthy as D. A. Dinakaran (Daddy)
- Ambika as Savithri's mother
- Fathima Babu as Usha, Arivazhagan's mother
- Jyothi as Kishore's mother
- Charle as Oomadurai
- Dhamu as Kamatchi
- Vaiyapuri as Meenatchi
- Mahanadi Shankar as Paan Kumar
- Thyagu as Illicit Arrack Seller
- Ramji as Natraj
- Santhana Bharathi as House Owner
- Shyam Ganesh as Raja
- Uma Maheshwari as Ilavarasi, Arivazhagan's sister
- Vanaja as Tamilarasi, Arivazhagan's sister
- Nair Raman as Nisha's grandfather
- Anjathe Sridhar as Paan Kumar's henchman
- Siva Narayana Murthy as Police inspector
- Vindhya in a special appearance

== Soundtrack ==
Alli Arjuna

Soundtrack album by A. R. Rahman
- Released: 31 December 2001
- Recorded: 2001
- Genre: Feature film soundtrack
- Label: The Best Audio
- Producer: A.R. Rahman

A. R. Rahman chronology
Parthale Paravasam (2001)	Alli Arjuna (2001)	Kannathil Muthamittal (2002)

The soundtrack of the movie was composed by A. R. Rahman. Four songs are re-used from Rahman's earlier Hindi films: Pukar, Earth and One 2 Ka 4.

Song	Artist(s)	Lyrics	Notes
"Sollayo Solaikilli"	S. P. Balasubramanyam, Swarnalatha, S. Janaki	Vairamuthu	Reused from "Sunta Hai Mera Khuda" from Pukar
"Shingu Lingu (Roja Solladi)"	K. S. Chithra	Vairamuthu	
"Onne Onne"	Sadhana Sargam, Shankar Mahadevan	Arivumathi	Reused "Banno Rani" from Earth
"Osaka Morayaa"	Vasundhara Das, Karthik	Vairamuthu	Reused "Osakka Muraiyaa" from One 2 Ka 4
"Endhan Nenjil"	S. Janaki, Srinivas	Vairamuthu	Reused "Sona Nahi Naa Sahi" from One 2 Ka 4

== Reception ==
Sify wrote "The plot is very thin and director Sharan, is totally confused. Manoj cannot act for nuts, while Richa Pallod too has a long way to go as far as emoting goes. A.R.Rahman?s music is a total let down. Enough suffered, enough endured". Rediff wrote "This, too, is typical of Sharan. The director has the knack of taking in the buzz words, and weaving them into plots. Thus, in Amarkalam, the Stockholm Syndrome, where the victim of a kidnapper begins to empathise with the abductor was used to good effect. But somehow the story fails to grip. As do the characters. If in Amarkalam, you empathised with the rowdy Ajit and the vivacious heroine, played by Shalini, you don't feel for either Manoj or Richa. This, coupled with an overdose of drama in the over-long climax, earn the film demerits at the box office". Cinesouth wrote "Charan is a very talented director. 75% of 'Alli Arjuna' proves it. But the missed 25% mistakes bring the whole movie down". Chennai Online wrote "The director takes a lot of care to see that the sets and ambience vary from film to film. So, while in 'Amarkkalam' it was a cinema theater, in 'Parthen Rasithen' it was a bus that was the focal point of narration. Here too he gives an authentic touch to an old bungalow to make it look like an abandoned police station. If only he had taken equal care in his scripting and characterisation!".
