= Parthen Rasithen =

2000 film directed by Saran

- Poster
- Directed by: Saran
- Written by: Saran
- Produced by: S. Thiruvengadam
- Starring: Prashanth; Simran; Laila
- Cinematography: A. Venkatesh
- Edited by: Suresh Urs
- Music by: Bharadwaj
- Production company: Serene Movie Makers
- Release date: 11 August 2000
- Running time: 166 minutes
- Country: India
- Language: Tamil

Parthen Rasithen (transl. I saw and admired) is a 2000 Indian Tamil-language romantic thriller film written and directed by Saran. The film stars Prashanth, Simran and Laila. Raghuvaran, Jai Ganesh, Vinu Chakravarthy, Vaiyapuri, Charle, Dhamu, Lawrence Raghavendra, Fathima Babu and Jyothi play supporting roles. It narrates Shankar's love story with Sarika, but problems and misunderstandings plague their romance. Bhanu, Shankar's best friend, also falls in love with him, and schemes to get Shankar to fall in love with her and break his love with Sarika. This film is based on the Hollywood film My Best Friend's Wedding.

The film was released on 11 August 2000, and received positive critical reception with Simran's negative performance receiving critical acclaim. The film became a sleeper hit and achieved blockbuster run at the Tamil Nadu box office. The film was remade in Telugu as Naa Manasistha Raa (2001) and in Kannada as Love Lavike (2002).

== Plot ==
Shankar is a graduate of BSC nautical science looking for a job in the shipping industry. He is a tenant in the house of Bhanu, a medicine student, who is also his good friend and confidante. They spend almost all their time together, and she seeks him out as a refuge due to her stepbrother Panneerselvam, whom she dislikes but is forced to live together with. One day, while dropping off Bhanu at a bus stop, Shankar sees a pretty girl Sarika and likes her. He tells Bhanu about Sarika, and they soon find out that Sarika is also interested, and they both eventually fall in love during their daily commute in the bus. Meanwhile, Shankar's rude and abusive father Chidhambaram lands in Chennai for his wife's heart surgery and tells Shankar that his marriage with a girl is being arranged swiftly and the same situation happens in Sarika's house simultaneously. However, both Shankar and Sarika are unaware that they themselves are the prospective suitors arranged for each other by the parents and thus avoid the formal meeting ceremony. Chidhambaram gets irritated and creates a ruckus at Sarika's house and after a huge argument, both the parents cancel the marriage arrangements.

Meanwhile, Panneer misunderstands the friendship between Bhanu and Shankar and assumes they are in love. He reveals this to Shankar's parents and asks their approval for the marriage. Shankar and Bhanu are surprised at this turn of events, but Bhanu makes Shankar temporarily accept this proposal in order to pacify his ailing mother until her surgery is over. Further misunderstandings occur between Shankar and Sarika when Panneer finds them together, and he exposes Shankar's wedding arrangements with Bhanu to Sarika. She is devastated and breaks up with Shankar. To solve the problem, Shankar asks Bhanu to explain the truth to Panneer, but she surprisingly refuses, revealing that she has been secretly in love with Shankar for years and she merely used the arranged wedding plans to work in her favor. She explains that she initially sacrificed her love after realizing that Shankar is in love with Sarika. However, after so many confusions including a failed marriage arrangement with Sarika, Bhanu feels that she is rightfully destined to be with Shankar. Shankar tries to explain that he has no such feeling towards her but Bhanu simply refuses to listen. Meanwhile, Sarika learns about Bhanu from the bus driver Vellaisamy and realizes Shankar is innocent and reconciles with him. Bhanu is infuriated, and in order to keep Sarika away from Shankar, she threatens her with the help of Doss, Sarika's stalker whose advances have been refused by her in the past. To celebrate their reconciliation, Shankar presents a saree to Sarika, but on the advice of Bhanu, Doss and his friends tease her and remove the saree forcefully in public. Bhanu, who witnesses this event, brings the humiliated and shaken Sarika home on the pretext of consoling her and getting her new clothes, but to Sarika's horror, she reveals her true identity and blackmails her to leave Shankar alone. Devastated and embarrassed by this incident, Sarika attempts suicide by consuming poison. Meanwhile, Panneer, who eavesdropped on the conversation, realizes his mistake and condemns Bhanu for her selfish actions. Sarika is brought to the same hospital where Bhanu studies, and because of the ongoing doctors' strike, she is unable to get any treatment. Bhanu, who happens to be there, is forced by her friends to help save Sarika. Shankar gets to know about Sarika's condition and furiously goes after Doss and thrashes him and his men.

Shankar arrives at the hospital after Doss reveals the truth that Bhanu is the person behind all this. However, Shankar finds that Sarika is being treated by none other than Bhanu. He begs Bhanu to save Sarika and promises to marry her in return for Sarika's life. The operation is successful, and as they walk out of the room, Bhanu tells Shankar that her love for him is gone after she had seen the extent to which Sarika has gone for him and that it would be impossible for Bhanu to find a place in Shankar's heart. She apologizes to Shankar for her behavior, he forgives her, and gets united with Sarika. Bhanu also finally finds peace with her brother Panneer and realizes his affection for her.

== Cast ==
- Prashanth as Shankar
- Simran as Bhanu
- Laila as Sarika
- Raghuvaran as Panneerselvam, Bhanu's brother
- Jai Ganesh as Sarika's father
- Shanmugasundari
- Siva Narayana Murthy
- Vinu Chakravarthy as Chidhambaram
- Raghava Lawrence as Doss
- Charle as Sophraj
- Dhamu as Vellaisamy
- Vaiyapuri as Bus Driver
- Jyothi as Shankar's mother
- Fathima Babu as Pinky Raja
- Manish Borundia as Sarika's brother
- Besant Ravi as Gaja
- Sridhar as Dancer in "Kedaikkala"

== Production ==
=== Development ===
Saran created the plot of Parthen Rasithen combining two elements: his experiences of travelling in bus to college and incidents that happened in the life of his brother K. V. Guhan, which inspired him to make a script on it. Saran agreed to the film for the producers who were simultaneously doing Hello (1999) with Prashanth at that time. The film was also reportedly inspired by the Hollywood film My Best Friend's Wedding (1997).

=== Casting ===
Saran chose Simran for the role of Bhanu since he felt the "script needed a performer like Simran. Her character had a lot of suppressed emotions, which would burst out once in a while", and also chose her after seeing her performance in Vaalee (1999). Saran first offered the script to Simran and "gave her a choice between Bhanu and Sarika's roles" she chose Bhanu's character since she had never played a villainous role before. Simran participated in a screen test and was confirmed for the role after she got good feedback from Saran. Laila was selected to play the other lead after Saran was impressed by her performance in Rojavanam (1999) though Saran's initial choice for the role was Rambha.

=== Filming ===
The crew bought a second-hand school bus, "and remodelled it for the shoot". They "removed the roof entirely and used acrylic sheets to let the light it, made the seats removable, and even had a trolley track inside the bus". Parthen Rasithen became the first Tamil film to be shot in Kilpauk Medical College. One of the songs were shot at 99 extensive group of islands at Malaysia.

== Soundtrack ==
The music has been composed by Bharadwaj and the lyrics were written by Vairamuthu. For the first time Prashanth lend his voice for a soundtrack. Venky of Chennai Online wrote "A very good effort by Saran and Bharadwaj after their successful Amarkkalam".

Song	Singer(s)	Duration
"Vaa Endrathu"	Prashanth	04:23
"Parthen Rasithen"	Yugendran, Reshmi	05:18
"Enakena Yerkanave"	Unnikrishnan, Harini	05:28
"Poove Punnagai"	Sonu Nigam, Vasundra Das	05:17
"Kedaikkala"	Srinivas	05:10
"Thinnadhey"	Shankar Mahadevan, Anuradha Sriram	05:05

== Critical reception ==
The Hindu wrote, "It is a spectacular role for Simran and she has made optimum use of it. A well-etched character which is suspenseful at every turn. Simran's eyes sparkle with animus, jealousy and venom in the scene in which she confronts Laila. Laila as the docile, taciturn beauty is an appealing foil to the fiery and vibrant Simran. Prashanth's plausible reactions to Simran's unrelenting moves, saying that he cannot think of her as a venomous person, are natural, and his performance is laudable. Raghuvaran is his usual self as the brother of Simran. There is no scope for him to show his mettle because though the character floats limpidly there is not much depth".

Malini of Chennai Online wrote, "The film begins promisingly enough and moves at an interesting pace in the first half. The script is well worked out, the director paying attention to minute details. But then he moves away from the main plot, brings in some twists and turns, gets confused and comes back to the story again". Tamil Star wrote, "The movie has a good story that keeps us guessing regarding the path it is going to take, a genuinely surprising twist, some nice characterizations and good comedy". The critic added, "Prashanth has ways to go in the histrionics department but makes up for it somewhat with his stunts. Laila looks cute but is completely sidelined by Simran".

== Accolades ==
At the PACE Trust Cine Awards 2000, Prashanth won the Best Actor award.

== Legacy ==
In 2016, Vijay Sethupathi was asked about his favourite romantic moments in cinema and what Valentine's Day means to him. He commented, "I've always been a huge admirer of Simran. I loved her in films like V. I. P., Kannedhirey Thondrinal and Parthen Rasithen". Simran's performance was featured in JFW magazine's list of "5 Heroines Who Stunned Us By Playing Negative Roles".
