= Puravalan Narayanasamy =

Singaporean Tamil actor

- Other name: Puravalan
- Occupations: Actor, host
- Years active: 2002–present

Puravalan Narayanasamy, known by his stage name Puravalan, is a Singaporean Tamil theatre, television, and film actor and host.

== Career ==
In the one man show play Bhishma the Grandsire & the Pitamaha (2011), Puravalan enacted several characters. The play was a duology in English and Tamil and he played 13-17 roles in each part. It was staged in Singapore, India, and Sri Lanka. He made his film debut in Enna Satham Indha Neram (2014) before starring in Kadaram Kondan (2019) playing police officers in both films.

In 2020, he starred in the Zee5 series Uyire.

== Theatre ==
Year	Drama	Role	Notes	Ref
2002	Animal Farm			
2011	Bhishma the Grandsire; Bhisma the Pitamaha	Bhishma, Sakuni, Draupadi, Arjuna, Duryodhana, and others	English-Tamil play	

== Filmography ==
=== Films ===
Year	Film	Role	Notes	Ref
2014	Thaedal	Varen	TV movie	
2014	Enna Satham Indha Neram	Sabha		
2017	Joe: The Black Assassin	Joe Shanmugam		
2017	Mudhal Vanakkam		TV movie	
2019	Kadaram Kondan	Navin		

=== Television ===
Year	Program	Role	Notes	Ref
2008	Guru Paarvai 2			
2010 – 2011	Vettai : Pledged to Hunt		Guest appearance	
2014	Ulagam Suttrum Kalaignam	Host		
2016	Theriyatha Tamil Cinema	Host		
2016 – 2017	Masala			
2017	Alaipayuthey			
2017	Thalli Pogathey			
2017	Athiyaayam	Madhavan		
2017 – 2018	Vettai: The Force	DSP Pradeep		
2019	Singa Airlines	Captain Aryan Eeswaran		
2019	Avathaaram	Elakkiyan		
2020	Uyire	Raghavan		
2020	Nenjil Thunivirundhal	Anthony Durairaj		
2023	Anbin Aaram			
2025	Amarkala Deepavali	Host		
2026	Must Date the Playboy	Bobby	Also associate producer	

== Awards and nominations ==
Year	Award	Category	Work	Result	Ref
2016	Pradhana Vizha	Best Actor	Kshatriyan	Nominated	
2018	Pradhana Vizha	Best Supporting Actor	Masala	Won	
2024	Pradhana Vizha	Best Supporting Actor	Naam 2	Nominated	
