= Amarkkalam =

1999 film directed by Saran

- Theatrical release poster
- Directed by: Saran
- Written by: Saran
- Produced by: V. Satya Narayana; V. Sudhir Kumar; V. Sumanth Kumar
- Starring: Ajith Kumar; Shalini
- Cinematography: A. Venkatesh
- Edited by: Suresh Urs
- Music by: Bharadwaj
- Production company: Venkateswaralayam
- Release date: 15 August 1999
- Running time: 155 minutes
- Country: India
- Language: Tamil

Amarkkalam (Tamil: அமர்க்களம்,, transl. "very good, first class") is a 1999 Indian Tamil-language romantic action film written and directed by Saran. The film stars Ajith Kumar and Shalini in the lead roles, with Raghuvaran, Nassar, Ponnambalam and Radhika in supporting roles.

Amarkkalam was Ajith's 25th film. The film released on 15 August 1999 to positive reviews from critics. The film was remade in Kannada as Asura and in Telugu as Leela Mahal Centre.

== Plot ==
Vasu is a ruthless hooligan who lives in a cinema theatre owned by Aarumugam. He had a tortured childhood and wastes his days by drinking, fighting, and sleeping. When Vasu's friend, Thilak, loses a reel of the Rajinikanth starrer Annaamalai (1992) to Mohana, Vasu and Mohana clash when he attempts to retrieve the reel. Mohana's family is members of the police, headed by Birla Bose, Mohana's father. At this point, Tulasi Das, an ex-mafia dada who spent many years in jail because of Bose, comes to the theatre. He dislikes Bose and hires Vasu to kidnap Mohana. When Mohana mocks Vasu for preventing her from singing, Vasu sings out his pain, and Mohana falls in love with him.

When Tulasi realizes that Mohana loves Vasu, he hires Vasu to pretend to love her. At first, it is just a pretense, but then he too begins to love her. Tulasi visits Bose to inform him of his daughter's love for a gangster and realises that Mohana is in fact, his daughter. A flashback shows the parted friendship between the two men, and Ganga, Tulasi's wife, abandoning him and their child when she discovers that her husband is a don. Knowing that Mohana is his daughter, Tulasi instructs Vasu to give up his love. When Vasu refuses, Tulasi visits Mohana and tells her about his ploy and that Vasu's love for her was fake. Mohana confronts Vasu and breaks off their relationship. Vasu, after a tense argument with Tulasi, tries to convince Mohana that even though it started as fake, what he feels for her now is genuine. However, she fails to understand. Heartbroken, Vasu joins Aasai's gang. In the meantime, Mohana meets Singampuli and hears about Vasu's childhood trauma and feels bad for him. Eventually, Vasu proves to Mohana that his love is sincere and unites with her after a clash between the cops, Tulasi, and Aasai's gang.

== Cast ==
- Ajith Kumar as Vasu
- Shalini as Mohana
- Raghuvaran as Tulasi Das
- Nassar as Commissioner Birla Bose
- Vinu Chakravarthy as Aarumugam
- Charle as Joe Thomas
- Dhamu as Thilak
- Vaiyapuri as Mani
- Ramesh Khanna as Singampuli
- Ponnambalam as "Aasai" Raj
- Ramji as Kutty
- Mahanadi Shankar as Kasi
- Poovilangu Mohan as DCP Ranjith Bose
- Ambika as Sharadha
- Radhika as Ganga
- Manish Borundia as Kishen
- Master Goutham as young Vasu

== Production ==
=== Development ===
The producers of the Saran directorial Kaadhal Mannan (1998), Venkateswaralayam insisted on doing another film with Ajith. The film began production without a script but only the title Amarkkalam being revealed. Saran initially came up with a script revolving around a gangster who loses his eyesight and makes many enemies; however he changed the script when his friends told him that several films on a similar subject were made at that time. He built a story around a setup of "a father meets his daughter without she releasing that he was her dad" based on a film he had seen and made this script completely into "a hero-centric film".

=== Casting ===
Jyothika was the first choice for the lead actress but could not accept it due to scheduling conflicts. Saran approached Shalini, who was studying at the time, and she refused, but after a three-month pursuit, he finally got her to sign on as well. Saran wanted Shalini because he found her "eyes to be arresting" and she gained the "image of 'everybody's adorable daughter' after Kadhalukku Mariyadhai", which he felt would be right for this role. The role of Tulasi Das was initially offered to Amitabh Bachchan who accepted before later pulling out of the film. Raghuvaran was Saran's next choice for the role who agreed because Saran felt "he'd understand this complex character, who wasn't a violent one or routine villain character. Also, I was particular that no one should be able to guess the film's turning point". Raghava Lawrence made his debut as a lead dancer in Tamil cinema through the song "Kaalam Kalikalam".

=== Filming ===
The film began production in January 1999 during the same time when Ajith was already attending shooting schedules for Anantha Poongatre, and during the production of the film, Ajith and Shalini fell in love and eventually got married in April 2000. For the lead protagonist's staying place, Saran decided to use a film theatre as a backdrop; he found Srinivasa Theatre after looking at its infrastructure.

== Soundtrack ==
The music was composed by Bharadwaj, with lyrics written by Vairamuthu. Shalini sang a song in the film, with Saran recommending her after he had heard her humming to a tune. Saran did not want the song "Satham Illamal" to be cinematic; for that he created a sad past of Ajith's character to justify the presence of the song in the film. The song's lyrics were based on a poem written by Vairamuthu where every line ended with the word "vendum" (I want). Bharadwaj suggested that instead of "vendum", the word should be "kaetaen" (I asked), so that the song would convey that the hero asked for everything, but ultimately did not get any, including death. Singer S. P. Balasubrahmanyam performed this song in a breathless manner.

Track listing
No.	Title	Singer(s)	Length
1.	"Kaalam Kalikalam"	Srinivas	4:40
2.	"Sontha Kuralil Paada"	Shalini	4:59
3.	"Satham Illatha"	S. P. Balasubrahmanyam, Sujatha Mohan	4:19
4.	"Unnodu Vaazha"	K. S. Chithra	5:18
5.	"Megangal Ennai Thottu"	S. P. Balasubrahmanyam	5:44
6.	"En Seidhaayo"	Bharadwaj	2:19
Total length:			27:19

== Release and reception ==
Amarkkalam was released on 15 August 1999. D. S. Ramanujam of The Hindu wrote, "A STORY of love and vendetta has been given glossy touches and interesting twists by director Saran (the screenplay, dialogue and story are also his) in Venkateswaralayam's Amarkallam, making it worth the money". K. P. S. of Kalki wrote the director created huge expectations, love element which was barely touched became a main focal point in second half, what could have been a first class film became an average film. The film went on to become a large success, extending Ajith Kumar's success after his previous film Vaalee. Ajith went on to purchase Saran a car as a token of gratitude for the success.

== Other versions ==
In 2000, Amarkkalam was dubbed and released in Telugu as Adbhutam by V. Satya Narayana. It was later remade in Kannada as Asura (2001), with Raghuvaran reprising his role. Despite the release of dubbed Telugu version there was a 2004 remake version in the same language titled Leela Mahal Centre. A Hindi remake starring Vivek Oberoi was planned by Saran but later dropped.

== Re-release ==
A digitally restored version of Amarkkalam was released on 16 May 2014.
