= Gurushetram – 24 Hours of Anger =

- Directed by: T. T. Dhavamanni
- Written by: T. T. Dhavamanni; Chong Tze Chien
- Produced by: Manickam; N. Tinagaran
- Starring: Vishnu; Sivakumar; Mathialagan M Rajesh Kannan; Gunalan Morgan; Prakash; T Nakulan; Diveshen Durairajoo
- Cinematography: Lucas Jodogne
- Edited by: Praveen K. L. N. B. Srikanth
- Music by: Rafee
- Production companies: Blue River Pictures; Singapore Film Commission
- Distributed by: Golden Village (Singapore); Metro Films (India); Suara Networks (Malaysia)
- Release dates: 8 April 2010 (Singapore); 25 March 2011 (India)
- Running time: 125 minutes
- Country: Singapore
- Language: Tamil

Gurushetram – 24 Hours of Anger is a 2010 Singaporean Tamil crime thriller film directed by T. T. Dhavamanni. Written by Dhavamani and Chong Tze Chien, the film stars Vishnu, Sivakumar, Mathialagan, Rajesh Kannan, and Gunalan in the lead roles. The film, produced by Blue River Pictures in collaboration with the Singapore Film Commission, is considered the first full-length Tamil film produced entirely in Singapore.

Gurushetram chronicles the trials and tribulations of the protagonist Prakash and how he overcomes these in his mission to protect his mentally challenged brother from the Singapore underworld, drug barons and law breakers. Filming was accomplished mainly on locations in and around Singapore and Ulu Tiram, Johor, Malaysia. The film was distributed in Singapore by Golden Village Pictures and had a theatrical release in India as Singayil Gurushetram on 25 March 2011.

== Plot ==
Set in contemporary Singapore, Gurushetram - 24 Hours of Anger, is a sinuously provocative, edge-of-your-seat thriller about Prakash who is brought up in a particular segment of the working-class Indian society lined with the wreckage of broken families and dreams. Prakash, a 17-year-old, losing his family, seeks shelter with his uncle Vinod, the head of a drug ring, with his mentally challenged younger brother. Vinod gets the boys involved in his criminal activity and soon makes them an integral part of his operation. Unbeknownst to Vinod, an adamant narcotics police superintendent is hot on their heels after receiving a string of tips offs from an anonymous informant. Vinod's long running smooth operation begins to hit snags; the police are suddenly able to disrupt his operations and make arrests. Vinod rightly believes that there is an informant within his gang, and after a while figures out who he is. The informant wants revenge; he holds Vinod responsible for the destruction of his family and wants to see Vinod destroyed.

An earnest social counselor tries to reach out to Prakash and his brother but meets resistance from those within and outside the law. Both the law enforcers and Vinod want a piece of Prakash and his defenseless sibling in a world fraught with peril, double-crossings and deceits. Prakash has no choice but play his final card to salvage the situation and protect his brother once and for all to make it fair-and-square.

== Cast ==
- Vishnu Andhakrishnan as Prakash
- Sivakumar Palakrishnan as Vinod
- Mathialagan M as Anbarasan
- Rajesh Kannan as Kanna
- Gunalan Morgan as Karthik
- Prakash Arasu as Subra
- Vicknesvari Muthusamy as Revathi
- T. Nakulan as Marsiling Baby
- Karthik Moorthy as Sundeli

== Release ==
=== Charity Gala premiere ===
The film had a Charity Gala Premiere in Singapore, the Guest of Honor being the President of the Republic of Singapore Sellapan Ramanathan. The event raised $120 000 for the needy children of Singapore. Other guests at the event included Senior Minister of State for Trade & Industry and Education Mr S. Iswaran and Nominated Member of Parliament Viswa Sadasivan.
