= Kaadhal Mannan =

- Theatrical release poster
- Directed by: Saran
- Written by: Saran
- Produced by: V. Sudhir Kumar
- Starring: Ajith Kumar; Maanu
- Cinematography: A. Vijayakumar
- Edited by: Ganesh Kumar
- Music by: Bharadwaj; M. S. Viswanathan (1 Song)
- Production company: Venkateswaralayam
- Release date: 6 March 1998
- Running time: 136 minutes
- Country: India
- Language: Tamil

Kaadhal Mannan (transl. King of Love) is a 1998 Indian Tamil-language romantic drama film written and directed by Saran (in his directorial debut). The film stars Ajith Kumar and newcomer Maanu in the lead roles. It also saw veteran music composer M. S. Viswanathan make his debut in a supporting role, while Vivek, Karan and Girish Karnad also played other roles.

Kaadhal Mannan was released on 6 March 1998 and became a commercial success.

== Plot ==
Rudran, a strict disciplinarian and father of two daughters, hates the word 'Love'. The very mention of this word makes him punish himself to extreme heights. He has disowned his elder daughter Menaka because she eloped with her lover. The strictness is doubled for the younger daughter Thilottama, and a marriage alliance is fixed for her. She stoically accepts her father's decision until she meets Shiva, a local mechanic. Shiva lives with his friend Oyya in a mansion owned by Mess Viswanthan. Shiva is always ready to accept dares. When Menaka dares him to go to Chennai to deliver a letter to Thilothama, Shiva ends up falling in love with Thilothama, but she is unable to reveal her love to Shiva and her father, as she fears the consequences. The film revolves around whether the lovers are able to declare their love for each other, and if Rudran accepts it.

== Cast ==
- Ajith Kumar as Shiva
- Maanu as Thilothama
- M. S. Viswanathan as Mess Viswanthan
- Vivek as Oyya
- Nithya as Manjari
- Karan as Ranjan
- Girish Karnad as Rudran
- Dhaarini as Menaka
- Ramesh Khanna as Black Dog security service Inspector
- Rathan Mouli as Ranjan's father
- Dhamu as Person in Mansion
- Ramji (special appearance in "Marimuthu Marimuthu" song)
- Kanal Kannan as Taxi Driver (special appearance)
- Chaams as Gurusaamy (uncredited)

== Production ==
Saran describes that he "was wondering what would happen if a girl, who is engaged to a particular person, falls in love with someone else" and this formed the basis of his plot for the film. The film saw veteran music composer M. S. Viswanathan make his acting debut in a supporting role, whilst the lead actress Maanu from Assam also debuted. After seeing Maanu perform during a dance show, actor Vivek recommended her to director Saran, who then offered her the lead role. Maanu initially turned down the opportunity, but signed on six months later after her parents consented. Viswanathan had initially waded away the approach but Vivek later convinced him to partake in the film. Few scenes were shot at Murugesan Mansion at Triplicane.

== Soundtrack ==
All the songs composed by Bharadwaj, except "Mettu Thedi" which was composed by M. S. Viswanathan. All lyrics were written by Vairamuthu. This is the Tamil debut of Bharadwaj.

Track listing
No.	Title	Singer(s)	Length
1.	"Unnai Paartha"	S. P. Balasubrahmanyam	5:12
2.	"Vaannum Mannum"	Hariharan, K. S. Chithra	5:15
3.	"Thilothamma"	Bharadwaj, Annupamaa	4:26
4.	"Mettu Thedi"	M. S. Viswanathan	4:45
5.	"Marimuthu Marimuthu"	Deva	4:48
6.	"Kanni Pengal"	Ada Ali Azad, Febi Mani	4:30
Total length:			28:56

== Release and reception ==
Kaadhal Mannan released on 6 March 1998. R. P. R. of Kalki called it an entertaining film without excessive fights, vulgar dance, no double meaning and no unnecessary sentiments. D. S. Ramanujam of The Hindu appreciated the performances of Ajith and Maanu, but felt Karan could have been more restrained. He also appreciated the cinematography, editing and art direction.

The film was a commercial success at the box office as it released during a period of crisis in the film industry where the FEFSI strike was ongoing and thus the distributors refused to pick the film up outright and insisted on distribution only. The first copy was worth Rs 22 million, but was only sold for Rs 16 million. Still, it ran for 80 days and re-established Ajith's market after a string of failures. Saran revealed that the film underperformed since it was targeted at youth, who were busy with exams in March. A. R. Swaminathan won the Tamil Nadu State Film Award for Best Sound Recordist. Despite winning plaudits for her portrayal, Maanu quit the film industry for over a decade before resurfacing as a promoter for the 2010 Singaporean film Gurushetram – 24 Hours of Anger and later as an aide to Rajinikanth during his health-related visit to Singapore in 2011.
