= Saran (director) =

Indian film director and screenwriter

- Born: Saravanan K Velayudam; Coimbatore, Tamil Nadu, India
- Occupations: Film director, screenwriter
- Years active: 1998–present
- Spouse: SOOBALEKSHMI
- Children: 2

Saravanan K Velayudam, better known as Saran, is an Indian film director and screenwriter who active mainly in Tamil cinema. He was once an assistant to K. Balachander. He owns a production house called Gemini Productions.

== Early life and career ==
Saran's father worked with the directorate of examinations and many of his relatives are teachers. He finished diploma in visual communications from the College of Arts And Crafts and became an instructor in textile designing. Saran worked as instructor for a year and, during this time, he did some work with a lady called Mohana who was art director for K. Balachander. KB was the director whom Saran admired above all others. Saran hoped this relationship would be the key to get to him.

By then, Saran was also a cartoonist for Ananda Vikatan. He would do this work at two in the morning, sleep for a bit and get back to work with KB by 7 am. Finally, Sarann gave up working as a cartoonist because assisting KB was too demanding. Then his first film happened. He describes that he "was wondering what would happen if a girl, who is engaged to a particular person, falls in love with someone else" and this formed the basis of his plot for his first film Kadhal Mannan (1998). The film saw veteran music composer M. S. Viswanathan make his acting debut in a supporting role, whilst the lead actress Maanu from Assam and music composer Bharadwaj also debuted. The film's soundtrack gained rave review prior to release. Viswanathan had initially waded away the approach but actor Vivek later convinced him to partake in the film. The film won positive reviews from critics, with a reviewer praising the film for tackling a taboo subject. The critic claimed that Ajith Kumar "was back at his best", whilst also crediting success to Maanu's performance and Bharadwaj's soundtrack. The film received a good response at the box office. The first copy was worth Rs 22 million, but was only sold for Rs 16 million. Despite all this, it ran 100 days and re-established Ajith Kumar's market after a string of failures. The producers of the previous collaboration of Ajith Kumar and Saran Kadhal Mannan, Venkateswaralayam had produced his next movie Amarkkalam (1999). Saran initially approached Shalini, who was studying at the time and she refused but after a three-month pursuit, he finally got her to sign on as well. The role of Tulasi Das was initially offered to Amitabh Bachchan who accepted before later pulling out of the film due to non availability of dates . The film began production in January 1999 and during the production of the film, the lead pair Ajith Kumar and Shalini fell in love and eventually got married in April 2000. The film won predominantly positive reviews upon release with a reviewer describing the film as having an "okay storyline made very good because of its brilliant execution" whilst stating that the "climax is also very well-developed" and praising the performance of Ajith Kumar. The film went on to become a large commercial success at the box office, extending the lead actor Ajith Kumar's success after his previous film Vaalee. Ajith went on to purchase Saran a car as a token of gratitude for the success.

His next film was Parthen Rasithen (2000) with Prashanth and Simran (their third time pair after successful hits such as Kannedhirey Thondrinal and Jodi). which did well at the box office and Simran's performance was well praised by critics.

But his next film Alli Arjuna (2002) was a flop in spite of A. R. Rahman's compositions. Then he directed a film for Vikram in a production under AVM Productions in Gemini (2002), it became a mass success at the time, it made Vikram very popular and one of the hit film, Ajith neglect to act because of his Racing Career Then he directed Jay Jay (2003) with Madhavan which was a hit. After Jay Jay, Saran works for the first time with Kamal Haasan in Vasool Raja MBBS (2004) which was a remake of the Hindi film Munna Bhai M.B.B.S.. The film received positive reviews and was a commercial blockbuster . His next film is again with Ajith in Attahasam (2004) also this film became a commercial blockbuster . After this films Saran directed Idhayathirudan (2006) with Jayam Ravi and was produced by veteran Director K. Balachander, The film received mixed reviews and was later considered a flop at the Box-office. His next venture is Vattaram with Arya the film received positive reviews and was a hit at the box office.

In early 2007, Saran agreed terms to direct his second film with Kamal Haasan in the lead role, while also taking up the role of producer. Saran later sold the production rights of the move to Ayngaran International, a move which irked Kamal Haasan and his team. As a result, the actor opted out and the film was shelved. Later he directed Modhi Vilayadu (2009) starring Vinay Rai and Kajal Aggarwal, the film was released to mixed reviews His next film is Aasal in which film Saran works once again with Ajith met with mixed reviews upon release but was an hit at the box-office.

His next movie Aayirathil Iruvar starring Vinay Rai released in September 2017. His movie Market Raja MBBS with Arav was released in 2019.

Currently He is writing Dialogues for an upcoming movie titled ‘’Sodaku’’

His next will be featured movie titled as ‘’Nayan Saras Ras nayan’’ in Hindi

Saran is known for his collaboration with Tamil film music composer Bharadwaj in a majority of his films and the director-composer duo was one of the most successful ones in Tamil film music.

== Personal life ==
Saran and his wife have two kids. His younger brother K. V. Guhan works as cinematographer in Tamil and Telugu film industry.

== Filmography ==
| Year | Film | Notes | | | |
|---|---|---|---|---|---|
| Year | Film | Notes | 1998 | Kadhal Mannan | Director debut; credited as Sharan |
| 1999 | Amarkkalam | | | | |
| 2000 | Parthen Rasithen | | | | |
| 2002 | Alli Arjuna | | | | |
| 2002 | Gemini | | | | |
| 2002 | Gemeni | Telugu film; remake of Gemini | | | |
| 2003 | Jay Jay | | | | |
| 2004 | Vasool Raja MBBS | | | | |
| 2004 | Attagasam | | | | |
| 2006 | Idhayathirudan | | | | |
| 2006 | Vattaram | | | | |
| 2009 | Modhi Vilayadu | | | | |
| 2010 | Aasal | | | | |
| 2017 | Aayirathil Iruvar | Also producer | | | |
| 2019 | Market Raja MBBS | | | | |

2026 || ‘’ Sodaku’’ ||Dialogue Writer

=== As producer ===
| Year | Film | Notes |
|---|---|---|
| 2005 | Aaru | |
| 2007 | Muni | |
