= List of Tamil films of 2012 =

Post-amendment to the Tamil Nadu Entertainment Tax Act 1939 on 27 September 2011, gross jumped to 130 per cent of net for films with non-Tamil titles and U certificates as well. Commercial Taxes Department disclosed ₹70.44 crore in entertainment tax revenue for the year.

This is a list of Tamil language films produced in the Tamil cinema in India that were released in 2012.

== Box office collection ==
Rank	Film	Worldwide gross
3	Nanban	₹150 crore
1	Thuppakki	₹128 crore
2	Naan Ee	₹120 crore (bilingual film)
4	Maattrraan	₹60 crore
5	Saguni	₹50 crore

== Released films ==
=== January–June ===
Opening		Title	Director	Cast	Genre	Notes	Ref
J A N	6	Madhuvum Mythiliyum	J Jayanthi	S.Bhuvan, Sriji	Romantic drama	Produced by Jayalakshmi Movie International	
J A N	12	Nanban	Shankar	Vijay, Jiiva, Srikanth, Ileana D'Cruz	Comedy drama	Produced by Gemini Film Circuit	
J A N	13	Kollaikaran	Tamil Selvan	Vidharth, Sanchita Shetty	Drama	Produced by Prasad Cine Arts	
J A N	14	Vettai	N. Linguswamy	Arya, R. Madhavan, Sameera Reddy, Amala Paul	Action-masala	Produced by Thirupathi Brothers & UTV Motion Pictures	
J A N	15	Medhai	N. T. G. Saravanan	Ramarajan, Kaushika	Drama	Produced by Kalaimagal Kalaikoodam	
J A N	26	Paari	Rajini	Rahul, Teena	Drama	Produced by S Muthu	
J A N	26	Settai Dhanam	Sathish R.	Krish, Varsha, Sathish R.	Drama	Produced by K. Suresh Kumar	
J A N	26	Theni Maavattam	P. R. Kaumaarimuthu	Gopalkandhan, Varsha	Romance	Produced by Gopalkandhan	
F E B	3	Marina	Pandiraj	Sivakarthikeyan, Oviya, Jayaprakash	Comedy drama	Produced by Pasanga Productions	
F E B	3	Sengathu Bhoomiyilae	Rathna Kumar	Pawan, Mirchi Senthil, Priyanka Nair, Sunu Lakshmi	Drama	Produced by Swami Cine Arts	
F E B	10	Dhoni	Prakash Raj	Prakash Raj, Akash Puri, Radhika Apte	Drama	Produced by Duet Movies; Simultaneously shot in Telugu as Dhoni	
F E B	10	Oru Mazhai Naangu Saaral	Anand	Ravi, Sudharshan, Ramya	Romance	Produced by CK3 Productions	
F E B	10	Oru Nadigaiyin Vaakkumoolam	Rajkrishna	Sonia Agarwal, Sukran, Kovai Sarala, Ganja Karuppu	Drama	Produced by SG Films	
F E B	10	Soozhnilai	T. Senthuran	Sathya, Paveena, Dhina, Nizhalgal Ravi	Drama	Produced by Global Television	
F E B	10	Vachathi	Ravi Thambi	Rethna Ramesh, Dharshana, Y. Gee. Mahendra	Drama	Produced by Olympia Productions	
F E B	10	Vilayada Vaa	Vijay Nantha	Viswanath Balaji, Divya Padmini	Sports	Produced by K. Thripurasundari	
F E B	17	Ambuli	Hari Shankar; Hareesh Narayan	R. Parthiban, R. Ajai, P. S. Srijith, Sanam Shetty	Fantasy	Produced by KTVR Creative Reels; Released in 3D	
F E B	17	Kadhalil Sodhappuvadhu Yeppadi	Balaji Mohan	Siddharth, Amala Paul	Romantic comedy	Produced by YNot Studios & Etaki Entertainment	
F E B	17	Muppozhudhum Un Karpanaigal	Elred Kumar	Adharvaa, Amala Paul	Romantic thriller	Produced by R. S. Infotainment	
F E B	17	Udumban	Ramji S. Balan	Dilip Rogger, Sana, Geetika	Action-drama	Produced by Modern Cinema	
F E B	24	Kadhal Paathai	Vyaasan	Vinod Kumar, Vidya	Romance	Produced by Sri Balaji Frames	
F E B	24	Virudhanagar Sandhippu	VSD Rengarajan	Chandru, Denna, K. R. Vijaya	Drama	Produced by ARB Productions	
M A R	2	Aravaan	Vasanthabalan	Aadhi, Pasupathy, Dhansika, Archana Kavi	Period piece	Produced by Amma Creations	
M A R	2	Kondaan Koduthaan	G. Rajendran	Kadhir Kaman, Advaitha	Drama	Produced by Ayyappa Art Films	
M A R	2	Shankar Oor Rajapalayam	Veera	Kanthesh, Hasika, Arun, Veerapandiyan	Drama	Produced by Golden Pictures	
M A R	9	Naanga	Selva	Sanjay Krishna, Vinod, Nivas, Udhay, Kasthuri, Vishnu Priya, Shivani Bhai	Drama	Produced by Sri Rajalakshmi Films	
M A R	9	Pathirama Pathukkunga	C. Somasundaram	Sharan, Swathi, Vaiyapuri	Drama	Produced by Saran Dot Creatives	
M A R	9	Sevarkkodi	R. Subramanian	Arun Balaji, Bhama	Romance	Produced by Bannari Pictures	
M A R	16	Kazhugu	Sathyasiva	Krishna Sekhar, Bindu Madhavi, Thambi Ramaiah	Comedy thriller	Produced by Talking Times and Arun Film Entertainments ||	
M A R	16	Maasi	G. Kicha	Arjun, Archana Gupta, Hema, Kota Srinivasa Rao	Action	Produced by Anbu Lakshmi Films	
M A R	16	Ullam	Arunmoorthy	Mithun, Priyamani	Romance	Produced by MVM Productions	
M A R	16	Vinmeengal	Vignesh Menon	Rahul Ravindran, Anuja Iyer, Shikha	Drama	Produced by Maanas Film Company	
M A R	23	Aayiram Muthangaludan Thenmozhi	Shanmugha Raj	Venkatesh, Akshara	Adult comedy	Produced by Dwarakamai Creations	
M A R	23	Kadhal Pisase	Aravind	Aravind, Midhuna, Santhanam	Comedy	Produced by Dream Art Creations	
M A R	23	Nanda Nanditha	Rama Siva	Hemachandran, Meghana Raj, Surya Pratap	Romance	Produced by Franch Pictures	
M A R	30	3	Aishwarya R. Dhanush	Dhanush, Shruti Haasan	Romantic drama	Produced by R. K. Productions	
M A R	30	Meeravudan Krishna	A. Krishna	A. Krishna, Shwetha, Radha	Romance	Produced by Duvarmayee Creations	
M A R	30	Mudhalvar Mahatma	A. Balakrishnan	Kanakaraj, Anupam Kher	Biographical		
M A R	30	Othakkuthirai	J. Srinivasan	Thiru, Anu Krishna	Romantic drama	Produced by Ponnu Swamy	
M A R	30	Otha Veedu	Balu Malarvannan	Dileep Kumar, Jahnavi Kamath	Thriller	Produced by Dev Kumar	
M A R	30	Sooriya Nagaram	Ma. Chellamuthu	Rahul Ravindran, Meera Nandan, R. V. Udayakumar	Drama	Produced by SKP. Rajan	
M A R	30	Star 67	Triden V. Balasingam, Kathi Selvakumar	Imman Kannan, Yasotha, Hamaltan Christy, Malarvilly Varatharaja	Crime thriller	Produced by Wotar Sound Pictures	
A P R	6	Asthamanam	Bandi Sarojkumar	Munnar Ramesh, Rajesh Kanagasabai, Victoria, Vidya, Sharan, Raghu	Romance	Produced by a Char Production	
A P R	6	Mazhaikaalam	S. Deepan	Sreeram, Saranya Nag, Ganja Karuppu	Romance	Produced by A. R. Screens	
A P R	6	Nandu Bhaskar		Thulasi			
A P R	13	Oru Kal Oru Kannadi	M. Rajesh	Udhayanidhi Stalin, Hansika Motwani, Santhanam	Comedy	Produced by Red Giant Movies	
A P R	13	Pachai Engira Kaathu	Keera	Vaasagar, Saranya, Appukutty Saravanan	Drama	Produced by Aa Thirai Nirvaanam	
A P R	20	Aduthathu	Thakkali Srinivasan	Sriman, Meenal, Darshini, Nassar	Thriller	Produced by Suthradhaar Film production	
A P R	20	Mattuthavani	Pavithran	Vimal, Soori	Drama		
A P R	20	Mye	Chi. Ra. Gopalan	Vishnupriyan, Shweta Prasad	Political drama	Produced by Padmalaya Cine Vision	
A P R	20	Ooh La La La	Jyothi Krishna	Jyothi Krishna, Divya Bhandari	Romance	Produced by Marshal Power Media	
A P R	27	Aathi Narayana	Vetrivendhan	Kajan, Meera Jasmine	Drama	Produced by Box Office Productions	
A P R	27	Leelai	Andrew Louis	Shiv Panditt, Manasi Parekh, Santhanam	Romance	Produced by Aascar Films	
A P R	27	Padam Parthu Kadhai Sol	Benjamin Prabhu	Tarun Shatriya, Shikha, Darshan	Suspense thriller	Produced by APM Productions	
M A Y	4	Gaantham	V. M. Saravanan	Tej, Rashmi, Pandiarajan	Romance	Produced by New Moon Studios	
M A Y	4	Parama Guru	J. S. Manimaran	J. S. Manimaran, Sreeja	Drama	Produced by JS Screens	
M A Y	4	Vazhakku Enn 18/9	Balaji Sakthivel	Sri, Mithun Murali, Urmila Mahanta, Manisha Yadav	Drama	Produced by Thirupathi Brothers	
M A Y	11	Kalakalappu	Sundar C	Vimal, Shiva, Anjali, Oviya, Santhanam	Comedy	Produced by UTV Motion Pictures & Avni Cinemax	
M A Y	18	Kandathum Kanathathum	Seelan	Vikas, Swasika	Romance	Produced by Sankara Pandian films	
M A Y	18	Raattinam	Thangasamy	Laguparan, Swathi, Ajay Athith	Romance	Produced by Raja Rathinam films	
M A Y	25	Anbulla Manvizhiye	Bramman	Sunil, Nazir, Hasini, Risha, Vadivukkarasi	Romance		
M A Y	25	Ishtam	Prem Nizar	Vimal, Nisha Aggarwal	Romance	Produced by Balaji Real Media	
M A Y	25	Konjum Mainakkale	Karthikeyan	Udhay, Mohanapriya, Akshatha	Drama	Produced by Satya Creations	
J U N	1	Idhayam Thiraiarangam	Ramki Ramakrishnan	Anand, Swetha, Manobala, Kavitha	Romance	Produced by Tamil Film Corporation	
J U N	1	Manam Kothi Paravai	Ezhil	Sivakarthikeyan, Athmiya Rajan	Romantic comedy	Produced by Olympia Movies	
J U N	1	Mayanginen Thayanginen	Vendhan	Nithin Sathya, Disha Pandey	Romantic thriller	Produced by Thaaiman Thiraiyagam	
J U N	1	Thadaiyara Thaakka	Magizh Thirumeni	Arun Vijay, Mamta Mohandas	Action	Produced by Feather Touch Entertainment	
J U N	8	Krishnaveni Panjaalai	Dhanapal Padmanabhan	Hemachandran, Nandana, Rajiv Krishna	Romance	Produced by Minveli Media Works	
J U N	8	Porkodi 10am Vaguppu	Pazha Suresh	Praveen, Brindha	Drama	Produced by New Teamwork Production	
J U N	8	Thoothuvan	Mohan Roop	Aditya, Gowri, Archana, Nikhil	Drama	Produced by Pioneer Movies	
J U N	15	Marupadiyum Oru Kadhal	Vasu Baskar	Anirudh, Jyoshna, Suman, Vadivelu	Romance	Produced by Connect Film Media	
J U N	15	Murattu Kaalai	K. Selva Bharathy	Sundar C, Sneha, Sindhu Tolani	Action-masala	Produced by Soorya Productions	
J U N	22	Saguni	Shankar Dayal	Karthi, Pranitha, Santhanam, Kota Srinivasa Rao, Radhika	Political satire	Produced by Dream Warrior Pictures	

=== July–December ===
Opening		Title	Director	Cast	Genre	Notes	Ref
J U L	6	Naan Ee	S. S. Rajamouli	Nani, Samantha, Sudeep	Fantasy	Produced by PVP Cinema	
J U L	13	Billa II	Chakri Toleti	Ajith Kumar, Parvathy Omanakuttan, Bruna Abdullah, Vidyut Jamwal, Sudhanshu Pandey	Gangster-thriller	Produced by Wide Angle Creations & IN Entertainment	
J U L	27	Maalai Pozhudhin Mayakathilaey	Narayan Nagendra Rao	Aari, Shubha Phutela	Romance	Produced by Sri Lakshmi Narasimha Creations	
J U L	27	Pechiyakka Marumagan	V. P. Bala Kumar	Tarun Gopi, Urvashi, Thambi Ramaiah	Drama		
J U L	27	Pollangu	Gandhi Marx	Ravi Rahul, Nisha Lalwani	Crime thriller	Produced by P. R. Entertainment	
J U L	27	Suzhal	Jayan R Krishnaa	Atul Kulkarni, Fariz, Hemachandran, Prathap K. Pothan, Nizhalgal Ravi	Action	Produced by Whyte Infotainment	
A U G	2	Madhubana Kadai	Kamala Kannan	Karthivel, Dhyana, Arvind Annamalai	Comedy	Produced by Montage Media Productions	
A U G	2	Mirattal	Madhesh	Vinay Rai, Sharmila Mandre, Prabhu	Masala	Produced by Metronet Multimedia	
A U G	3	Aasami	Aandar Raj	Ramesh, Santhana Bharathi, Pandu, Shakeela, Aarthi	Drama		
A U G	3	Yugam	Sribavansekar	Rahul Madhav, Deepthi Nambiar	Drama	Produced by ACE Entertainment	
A U G	10	Adhisaya Ulagam	Shakthi Scott	Livingston, Ananda Kannan, Prithvi, Sreelakshmy, Latha Rao	Fantasy		
A U G	10	Eppadi Manasukkul Vanthai	P. V. Prasad	Vishva, Irfan, Tanvi Vyas	Romance		
A U G	10	Palayamkottai	G. Shekar	G. Shekar, Inbanila, Bose Venkat	Action	Produced by Visalatchi Amma Creations	
A U G	10	Panithuli	Natty Kumar	Ganesh Venkatraman, Shobhana Shankar, Kalpana Pandit	Romance	Produced by Dreams On Frames and House Of Pandit	
A U G	10	Sri Ramakrishna Darshanam	G. N. Dass	Sashikumar, Lakshmi, Delhi Ganesh	Drama	Produced by G.N.D. Vision International Private Limited	
A U G	15	Attakathi	Pa. Ranjith	Dinesh, Nandita Swetha, Aishwarya Rajesh	Romantic comedy	Produced by Thiru Kumaran Entertainment	
A U G	15	Iruvan	E. S. Muruganandam	Praveen, Prakash, Shaina	Drama	Produced by Zion Pictures	
A U G	15	Naan	Jeeva Shankar	Vijay Antony, Siddharth Venugopal, Rupa Manjari, Vibha Natarajan, Anuya Bhagvath	Crime thriller	Produced by Vijay Antony Corporation	
A U G	17	Etho Seithai Ennai	Elvin Bosser	Shakthi, Liyasree, Anand, Anand Babu	Drama	Produced by Adhi Sakthi Movies	
A U G	17	Pandi Oliperukki Nilayam	Rasu Madhuravan	Sabarish, Sunaina, Soori, Karunas	Romantic comedy	Produced by Nesika Thirai Arangam	
A U G	17	Poovampatty	Pudugai Marisa	Sandeep, Sri Shalini, Lavanya, Vagai Chandrasekar			
A U G	24	18 Vayasu	R. Panneerselvam	Johnny, Gayathrie Shankar	Psychological thriller	Produced by NIC Arts	
A U G	24	Aachariyangal	Harshavardhan	Thaman Kumar, Aishwarya Rajesh, Reethu Mangal, Narayanan	Fantasy		
A U G	24	Anil	ARS	Anil Bharath, Ashrith Bhanu			
A U G	24	Avan Appadithan	SP Raja	Jayan Vaikuntha, Karuna, Della Raj, Sasha, Babilona	Adult thriller		
A U G	24	Perumaan	J. Rajesh Kannan	Arjun, Shruti, Sriram Vedam	Thriller	Produced by Sri Kamakshi Vision	
A U G	31	Mugamoodi	Mysskin	Jiiva, Narain, Pooja Hegde, Nassar, Selvaah	Superhero	Produced by UTV Motion Pictures	
A U G	31	Valiban Suttrum Ulagam	AR Lalithaswamy	MGR Siva, MGR Hari	Spoof		
S E P	7	Arakkonam	S. S. Reddy	Sriman, Prachi Adhikari, Ponnambalam	Crime thriller	Produced by Ramana Gudipati and S. S. Reddy	
S E P	7	Kalla Parunthu	Idhayan	Amsavel, Manju, Shobana	Adult romance		
S E P	7	Mannaru	S. Jaishankar	Appukutty, Thambi Ramaiah, Swathy, Vaishali	Drama	Produced by Suji & Rathna Films	
S E P	7	Paagan	Aslam	Srikanth, Janani Iyer, Kovai Sarala	Romantic comedy	Produced by V P Productions	
S E P	14	Nellai Santhippu	Naveen	Rohit, Bhushan, Megha Nair Devika	Drama	Produced by T Creations Thirumalai	
S E P	14	Sundarapandian	S. R. Prabhakaran	M. Sasikumar, Lakshmi Menon, Vijay Sethupathi, Soori	Drama	Produced by Company Production	
S E P	19	Chaarulatha	Pon Kumaran	Priyamani, Skanda, Saranya Ponvannan, Seetha	Horror	Produced by Global One Studios	
S E P	19	Saattai	Anbazhagan	Samuthirakani, Mahima Nambiar, Ajmal Khan, Thambi Ramaiah, Swasika	Drama	Produced by Shalom Creations	
S E P	28	Thaandavam	A. L. Vijay	Vikram, Anushka Shetty, Amy Jackson, Lakshmi Rai	Action	Produced by UTV Motion Pictures	
O C T	5						
O C T	5	Pudhiya Kaaviyam	Pe Na Ramesh	Dilip, Jahnavi Kamath, Athesh, Halwa Vasu	Drama		
O C T	5	Sembattai	Ganesh	Dileepan, Srijith, Gowri Nambiar	Drama		
O C T	12	Maattrraan	K. V. Anand	Suriya, Kajal Aggarwal, Tara, Sachin Khedekar	Action thriller	Produced by AGS Entertainment	
O C T	12	Soundarya	Chandramohan	Govind, 'Killer' Kasim, Rithoosan, Sarath, Santosh	Erotic thriller		
O C T	19	Amridha Yokam	A Manicka Raj	Sridhar, Vennila	Drama		
O C T	19	Koyambedu Perundhu Nilayam	R. Manivasagan	Ashok, Anvitha	Romance		
O C T	19	Pizza	Karthik Subburaj	Vijay Sethupathi, Remya Nambeesan	Romantic thriller	Produced by Thirukumaran Entertainment	
O C T	19	Thiruthani	Perarasu	Bharath, Sunaina, Rajkiran, Pandiarajan	Action		
O C T	26	Aarohanam	Lakshmy Ramakrishnan	Viji Chandrasekhar, Jayaprakash, Uma Padmanabhan	Drama	Produced by AVA Productions	
O C T	26	Chakravarthy Thirumagan	L. Purushottaman	MGR Siva	Comedy		
O C T	26	Mayilu	Jeevan	Sri, Shammu	Drama	Produced by Duet Movies	
O C T	26	Vavval Pasanga	Suresh	Rahul, Utthara Unni	Drama	Produced by Sree Raji Movies	
N O V	2	Ariyaan	P. Karthikeyan	Santosh Bhavan, Ragini Dwivedi	Drama	Produced by Blessing Entertainers	
N O V	2	Asaivam	Kishore	Sidhaarth, Jennifer, Srija	Romance		
N O V	2	Magan	K. P. Sundareshan	Jai Anand, Nancy	Drama	Produced by Sivas Creation	
N O V	2	Yaarukku Theriyum	Ganesan Kamaraj	Kalabhavan Mani, Nishan, Jayaprakash, Riyaz Khan, Harish Raj, Sanjana Singh	Thriller	Produced by Arubere Art Ventura Pvt Ltd	
N O V	9	Ajantha	Rajppa Ravishankar	Ramana, Vinu Mohan, Honey Rose, Sai Kiran, Vandana Gupta			
N O V	13	Ammavin Kaipesi	Thangar Bachan	Shanthnu Bhagyaraj, Iniya	Drama	Produced by Thankar Thiraikalam	
N O V	13	Kasi Kuppam	Arun	Aadarsh, Archana, Aadukalam Naren	Drama	Produced by Balamurugan films	
N O V	13	Podaa Podi	Vignesh Shivaa	Silambarasan, Varalaxmi Sarathkumar, Shobana	Romance	Produced by Gemini Film Circuit	
N O V	13	Thuppakki	A. R. Murugadoss	Vijay, Kajal Aggarwal, Vidyut Jamwal, Jayaram	Thriller	Produced by V Creations	
N O V	23	Kai	Vinoth Raghava	Vijith, Joshna Fernando	Romance		
N O V	30	Naduvula Konjam Pakkatha Kaanom	Balaji Tharaneetharan	Vijay Sethupathi, Gayathrie Shankar	Comedy	Produced by Leo Vision	
N O V	30	Neerparavai	Seenu Ramasamy	Vishnu, Sunaina, Nandita Das, Saranya Ponvannan	Drama	Produced by Red Giant Movies	
D E C	8	Sun Sun Thatha	Nassar	Ahbi, Jamali Shadat, Nassar	Drama		
D E C	14	Kumki	Prabhu Solomon	Vikram Prabhu, Lakshmi Menon	Drama	Produced by Thirupathi Brothers	
D E C	14	Neethaane En Ponvasantham	Gautham Vasudev Menon	Jiiva, Samantha, Santhanam	Romance	Produced by Photon Kathaas & RS Infotainment	
D E C	21	Sattam Oru Iruttarai	Sneha Britto	Thaman Kumar, Piaa Bajpai, Bindu Madhavi, Reemma Sen	Action		
D E C	28	Akilan	Henri Joseph	Dr. Saravanan, Vidya, Rajkapoor	Drama	Produced by Spotlight Cine Creations	
D E C	28	Kandu Pudichitten	R. Gopal Raj	Sanni, Sana	Romance		
D E C	28	Kozhi Koovuthu	K. I. Ranjith	Ashok, Sija Rose, Rohini, Bose Venkat	Drama	Produced by Bright Media	
D E C	28	Paraseega Mannan	J. Suresh	J. Suresh, Sruthi Lakshmi, Ramesh Khanna, KK	Action thriller	Produced by Rich Art Productions	
D E C	28	Pudhumugangal Thevai	Maneesh Babu	Shivaji Dev, Rajesh Yadhav, Muktha Bhanu, Vishnupriya	Drama	Produced by Winner Bull Films	

== Dubbed films ==
Opening	Title	Director(s)	Original film		Cast	Notes	Ref.
Opening	Title	Director(s)	Film	Language	Cast	Notes	Ref.
30 September	Thulli Ezhunthathu Kadhal	Sreehari Nanu	Thakita Thakita	Telugu	Harshvardhan Rane, Hariprriya, Nagarjuna, Anushka Shetty, Bhumika Chawla	Produced by Chennai Film School Production	
5 October	English Vinglish	Gauri Shinde	English Vinglish	Hindi	Sridevi, Priya Anand, Adil Hussain	Produced by Hope Productions	

== Awards ==
Category/organization	Filmfare Awards South 20 July 2013	SIIMA Awards 12 September 2013	Tamil Nadu State Film Awards 14 July 2017	Vijay Awards 11 May 2013
Best Film	Vazhakku Enn 18/9	Kumki	Vazhakku Enn 18/9	Vazhakku Enn 18/9
Best Director	Balaji Sakthivel; Vazhakku Enn 18/9	Balaji Sakthivel; Vazhakku Enn 18/9	Balaji Sakthivel; Vazhakku Enn 18/9	Balaji Sakthivel; Vazhakku Enn 18/9
Best Actor	Dhanush; 3	Dhanush; 3	Jiiva; Neethaane En Ponvasantham	Dhanush; 3
Best Actress	Samantha; Neethaane En Ponvasantham	Hansika Motwani; Oru Kal Oru Kannadi	Lakshmi Menon; Kumki / Sundarapandian	Samantha; Neethaane En Ponvasantham
Best Music Director	D. Imman; Kumki	Harris Jayaraj; Thuppakki	D. Imman; Kumki	D. Imman; Kumki

== Notable deaths ==
Month	Date	Name	Age	Profession	Notable films	Ref
January	1	Mohan	81	Director	Annakili • Kavikkuyil • Rosaappo Ravikkai Kaari	
January	30	Idichapuli Selvaraj	73	Actor	Enga Chinna Raasa • Velaikaran • Muthu	
February	15	R. N. K. Prasad	82	Cinematographer	Annakili • Naandi • Rosaappo Ravikkai Kaari	
February	20	S. N. Lakshmi	85	Actress	Server Sundaram • Michael Madana Kama Rajan • Mahanadhi	
February	22	Muthuraj		Actor	Chithiram Pesuthadi • Kalavani • Konjam Veyil Konjam Mazhai	
April	2	M. Saroja	79	Actress	Sarvadhikari • Then Nilavu • Kalyana Parisu	
April	3	P. Kalaimani	62	Writer	16 Vayathinile • Pillai Nila • Mann Vasanai	
May	1	Shanmugasundari	75	Actress	En Annan • Idhayakkani • Neerum Neruppum	
May	14	Taruni Sachdev	14	Child actress	Vetri Selvan	
May	25	Dilip	56	Actor	Varumayin Niram Sivappu • Thoongadhey Thambi Thoongadhey • Samsaram Adhu Minsaram	
June	14	Kaka Radhakrishnan	86	Actor	Thevar Magan • Kadhalukku Mariyadhai • Vasool Raja MBBS	
June	19	K. R. Gangadharan	73	Producer	Guru En Aalu • Johnny • Thudikkum Karangal	
August	7	Ennatha Kannaiya	87	Actor	Ezhai Padum Padu • Thottal Poo Malarum	
September	16	Loose Mohan	84	Actor	Harichandra • Rosaappo Ravikkai Kaari • Azhagi	
September	17	A. V. M. Murugan	77	Producer		
September	18	Periya Karuppu Thevar	78	Actor	Virumaandi • Poo • Thirupaachi • Murattu Kalai	
September	23	Ashwini	43	Actress	Pondatti Thevai	
September	24	Thilakan	77	Actor	Chatriyan • Mettukudi	
October	12	Dileepan	32	Actor	Azhagiya Theeye • Pattiyal • Sindhanai Sei	
October	22	Bidushi Dash Barde	23	Actress	Vettaiyaadu Vilaiyaadu	
October	22	Shubha Phutela	21	Actress	Maalai Pozhudhin Mayakathilaey	
December	13	Karnan	79	Cinematographer	Karpagam • Jambhu • Jakkamma	
