= Joshna =

Joshna is an Indian feminine given name. Notable people with the name include:

- Joshna Chinappa (born 1986), Indian squash player
- Joshna Fernando (born 1991), Indian actress and model

== See also ==
- Joshua (name)
