= Tejali Ghanekar =

Indian actress

- Born: Mumbai, India
- Other name: Sulekha
- Occupation: Actress
- Years active: 1993–1999

Tejali Ghanekar is a former Indian actress who has appeared in Hindi television serials, and Malayalam and Tamil language films in the 1990s. After beginning her career as an actress on Doordarshan soap operas, Tejali appeared Suresh Krissna's Aahaa (1997) under the stagename of Sulekha.

== Career ==
Tejali Ghanekar grew up in a family involved in the film industry, with her great-uncle Govind B. Ghanekar, and uncle Girish Ghanekar, being involved in directing Hindi and Marathi language films. Tejal began working in theatre as a teenager and learnt classical dance from Rajkumar Ketkar. She subsequently enrolled to professionally learn acting at the Madhumati Academy Of Film Dancing & Acting in Mumbai, and was later cast in television serials on Doordarshan including Kucch Bhi Ho Sakta Hai, Vinod Pande's Reporter and Vikram Bhatt's Apne Jaise Types.

Tejali's first appearance in a feature film was through Suresh Krissna's Aahaa (1997). Featuring alongside an ensemble cast including fellow rookie Rajiv Krishna and veteran actors Raghuvaran, Bhanupriya, Srividya and Vijayakumar, the film opened to positive reviews and performed well at the box office. She subsequently went on to shoot for two Malayalam films in quick succession, Meenathil Thalikettu (1998) with Dileep, and Chandamama (1999) with Kunchako Boban.

After returning to Mumbai for a break from films, Tejali opted to quit the film industry. She later moved on to work in business development for a multinational corporation, complete a master's degree in commerce, and then move to Singapore post-marriage during January 2004. She later also completed a further master's degree in mass communication from Nanyang Technological University in Singapore.

== Filmography ==
Films

Year	Film	Role	Language	Notes
1997	Aahaa	Janaki	Tamil	
1998	Meenathil Thalikettu	Malathi	Malayalam	
1999	Chandamama	Maya	Malayalam	

Television

Year	Film	Role	Network	Language	Notes
1993	Kucch Bhi Ho Sakta Hai		Doordarshan	Hindi	
1994-95	Reporter		Doordarshan	Hindi	
1996-97	Apne Jaise Types		Sony SAB	Hindi	
