= Kavithai =

2004 film by Kicha

- Theatrical release poster
- Directed by: Kicha
- Starring: Vamsi; Chaya Singh
- Music by: Deva
- Release date: April 22, 2004
- Country: India
- Language: Tamil

Kavithai: Kathalukku Mattum (transl. Poem: just for love) is a 2004 Indian Tamil-language romantic action film written and directed by Kicha. It stars Vamsi and Chaya Singh. The score and soundtrack for the film were by Deva.

== Cast ==
- Vamsi as Sakthi
- Chaya Singh as Subbulakshmi
- Sarath Babu as Subbulakshmi's father
- Nalini as Subbulakshmi's stepmother
- Fathima Babu
- Shakeela as 'Madam'
- Sukran
- Ilavarasu
- Muthukaalai

== Production ==
The film marked the acting debut of Hemachandran, who was credited in the film as Vamsi.

== Release and reception ==
Sify.com's review noted it was a "well-made youth oriented film with an innovative story and a good climax". A reviewer from the entertainment portal ChennaiOnline.com noted "it's a story of star-crossed lovers, and the director has managed to make it fairly appealing till the first half", adding "but then the innumerable twists and turns he introduces into the script keeps the audience wondering if the story would ever have an ending". The film was a disaster at box-office.
