= Aahaa (1997 film) =

- Theatrical release poster
- Directed by: Suresh Krissna
- Screenplay by: Ananthu; Suresh Krissna
- Dialogue by: Crazy Mohan
- Story by: Suresh Krissna
- Produced by: R. Mohan
- Starring: Rajiv Krishna; Sulekha
- Cinematography: S. Saravanan
- Edited by: Suresh Urs
- Music by: Deva
- Production company: Shogun Films Ltd
- Release date: 30 October 1997
- Running time: 162 minutes
- Country: India
- Language: Tamil

Aahaa (transl. Wow!) is a 1997 Indian Tamil-language film directed by Suresh Krissna, starring Rajiv Krishna and Sulekha. The film was a decent hit among Diwali releases and ran for 100 days. It was remade in Telugu under the same title (1998) and in Kannada as Ghauttham (2009).

== Plot ==
Parasuraman is a rich businessman who lives with his wife Pattammal, elder son Raghu, younger son Sriram, and a physically challenged daughter, Gayatri. Raghu is more mature, and he assists his father in managing the business, while Sriram is a fun-loving person. Parasuraman hates Sriram's careless attitude, and he keeps scolding him often for his irresponsible behavior. Rajeshwari is Raghu's wife, and she is close to her family members.

Sriram falls in love with Janaki, daughter of Ganesan, a cook. Sriram gets Rajeshwari's help to convince Parasuraman about his love. However, Parasuraman does not accept his son's love as Ganesan is from a low societal status. One day, Sriram follows Raghu and learns about his relationship with Geetha. Sriram is angered thinking that they are in an illegitimate relationship. But Raghu tells a flashback that both he and Geetha were in love during college days, and suddenly Geetha went away without informing Raghu. After a few years, Raghu married Rajeshwari, and recently, he got a call from Geetha. While meeting, Raghu got to know that Geetha was suffering from a brain tumor, and that was the reason she decided to stay away from Raghu. As she approached her last days, Geetha requested Raghu to be near her as she died and he accepted.

Sriram understands the situation and befriends Geetha. One day, Geetha's condition gets serious, and Sriram rushes her to the hospital, as Raghu is away for a business meeting. Geetha dies in the hospital. Parasuraman spots Sriram along with Geetha while he takes her to the hospital, misunderstands that Sriram is in a relationship with another girl, and scolds him. Sriram accepts the blame as he does not want his brother's marriage life to be spoiled by revealing the truth. Raghu thanks Sriram for taking care of all the formalities after Geetha's death during his absence. In this, due to a misunderstanding, Sriram and Janaki split and Janaki's family moves to Chidambaram.

Meanwhile, Gayatri's wedding is fixed, and Raghu has to travel to Chidambaram the day before the marriage for a meeting with Janaki and to convince her to come back. The train in which Raghu travels meets with an accident. Sriram gets the information and rushes to the railway station and is shocked to see Raghu's name on the passengers’ death list. Sriram does not inform this to his family as he does not want his sister's wedding to be canceled because of this. Sriram hides the information and pretends to be happy in front of others. Meanwhile, everyone starts looking for Raghu as he is expected to return on the day of marriage. Sriram lies that Raghu is unable to attend the wedding.

The wedding is done, and Sriram informs everyone of Raghu's death. All the family members are shocked to hear this. To everyone's surprise, Raghu suddenly arrives at the wedding hall. Sriram inquires about the train accident to Raghu. Raghu informs that he missed boarding the train at the last minute, and he finally took a car, and luckily he was escaped from the accident. He apologizes to everyone as he did not inform about this to them. Now, Parasuraman understands Sriram's responsible behavior and affection towards his sister, as he does not want her wedding to be canceled, and starts praising Sriram. Meanwhile, Raghu also informs the truth about his relationship with Geetha and clarifies that Sriram is not connected to her. Raghu also apologizes to Rajeshwari for hiding the truth about Geetha which she forgives immediately. In the end, Sriram and Janaki reconcile.

== Cast ==
- Rajiv Krishna as Shree Raman
- Sulekha (Tejali Ghanekar) as Janaki
- Vijayakumar as Pepsi Parasuraman
- Raghuvaran as Raghuraman
- Bhanupriya as Rajeshwari
- Delhi Ganesh as AGS.Ganesan
- Radhabhai as Lakshmi
- Srividya as Pattammal
- Sukanya as Geetha
- Master Mahendran as Ajay Raman
- Kavithalaya Krishnan as Krishna
- Dhamu as Gopal
- Mohan Raman as Vishwanathan Iyer
- Bombay Gnanam as Ambujam
- M.R.K. as Venu Shastri
- Crazy Venkatesh as Sethuraman Iyer
- Anitha Venkat as Gayathri

== Production ==
After Suresh Krissna finished directing Baashha (1995), which was heavy on action, Ananthu suggested his next film be drastically different; this led to Aahaa..! being developed. The film marked a comeback for actress Bhanupriya, while debutants Rajiv Krishna (Chandresh) and Sulekha were selected to play the lead roles.

== Soundtrack ==
Music was composed by Deva, while lyrics were written by Vaasan. The song "Mudhan Mudhalil" was based on the Hindi song "Sochenge Tumhe Pyaar" composed by Nadeem–Shravan for Deewana.

| Song | Singers | Lyrics | Length |
|---|---|---|---|
| "Aaha Yeh Hai" | Gopal Rao, Sujatha | Vaasan | 05:14 |
| "Hip Hip Hurray" | Hariharan | Vaasan | 05:41 |
| "Kozhi Vandhadhaa" | Sujatha, Yugendran, Anuradha Sriram, Malaysia Vasudevan | Vaasan | 04:19 |
| "Mudhan Mudhalil" (Duet) | Hariharan, K. S. Chithra | Vaasan | 04:46 |
| "Mudhan Mudhalil" (Solo) | Hariharan | Vaasan | 04:46 |
| "Seetha Kalyana" | Meera Krishnan | Thyagaraja | 00:24 |

== Reception ==
A critic from The Hindu opined that "Director Suresh Krishna deserves praise for presenting a clean and wholesome family entertainer". Ji of Kalki panned the beginning narration of character introduction and Deva's music but praised the performances of cast and Crazy Mohan's dialogues and concluded saying Suresh Krissna has tried to be unique without any resemblance, so far so good. Crazy Mohan won the Cinema Express Award for Best Dialogue Writer.
