= Irumbu Kuthirai =

2014 Indian film by Yuvaraj Bose

- Poster
- Directed by: Yuvaraj Bose
- Written by: Yuvaraj Bose, Narsim
- Produced by: Kalpathi S. Aghoram; Kalpathi S. Ganesh; Kalpathi S. Suresh
- Starring: Atharvaa; Priya Anand; Raai Laxmi; Johnny Trí Nguyễn
- Cinematography: R. B. Gurudev; Gopi Amarnath
- Edited by: T. S. Suresh
- Music by: G. V. Prakash Kumar
- Production company: AGS Entertainment
- Distributed by: AGS Entertainment; Kalasangham Films
- Release date: 29 August 2014
- Running time: 122 minutes
- Country: India
- Language: Tamil

Irumbu Kuthirai (transl. Iron Horse) is a 2014 Indian Tamil-language action film written and directed by Yuvaraj Bose and produced by AGS Entertainment. The film stars Atharvaa, Priya Anand, Raai Laxmi and Johnny Tri Nguyen. The film was released on 29 August 2014.

== Plot ==
Prithviraj Narayanan is a Pizza Delivery Boy who lives with his mother Mary and his sister. His bestfriends are Jagan and Christina.

Prithvi receives complaints from his boss for slow pizza delivery, he follows every rule on riding the bike after a bike accident where he witnessed his father's death. Prithvi falls in love with Samyuktha alias Sam, they become friends and she asks him to buy a bike. Samyuktha suggested him to get a second-hand black Ducati Diavel known as the Raven.

But that very bike brings danger to Prithvi due to a shocking past. One day Prithvi and Sam get into an argument when he attempts to kiss her and she tells him that she only likes him as a friend. On the way home, Samyuktha is kidnapped by mysterious bikers. Prithvi, Jagan and Christina look for clues to find the kidnappers. The kidnapper is revealed to be Don Stoney who was the first owner of Prithviraj's bike.

Don Stoney named his bike as the Raven for its extreme speed. Stoney was fired from Motocross in France after he beats a guy to death for scratching his Raven. Stoney is obsessed with his Raven. Stoney's brother, Roger, takes Raven and competes with another racer called Michael (who's always wearing a helmet and whose face is never shown). At the race, Roger loses the Raven to Michael. Unable to face his brother, Roger commits suicide. For 3 years Don Stoney has been searching high and low for his Raven, and the racer Michael – whom he sees as the cause of his brother's death.

Prithvi receives a call from Stoney who asks him to come to his hideout at Mahé if he wants Samyuktha back safely. As Prithvi leaves, Jagan talks to Christina, who reveals the truth about Prithvi – his full name is Michael Prithviraj Narayanan. Prithvi is none other than the Michael who rightfully won the Raven.

Michael enters a race against Stoney and wagers pink slips for the Raven. During the race, Stoney gains an advantage, but loses it when Michael uses his extreme skill to catch up to Stoney, handing the victory to Michael. Afterwards, Stoney releases Samyuktha and says that he does not want the Raven without winning it. He tells Michael that one day he will come back to challenge him again for the Raven, and that until then, Michael is the only other person worthy of possessing the Raven. He lets Michael and Samyuktha go, who then leave on the Raven, heading back home.

== Cast ==
- Atharvaa as Michael Prithviraj Narayanan
- Priya Anand as Samyuktha Ramakrishnan
- Raai Laxmi as Christina
- Johnny Tri Nguyen as Don Stoney
- Jagan as Jagan
- Manobala as Prithviraj's boss
- Mayilsamy as Jeevan Ramesh
- Devadarshini as Mary Narayanan
- Anupama Kumar as Samyuktha's aunt
- Swaminathan as traffic police
- Sachu as Prithviraj's grandmother
- Joe Malloori as Rooban
- Neelu as Prithviraj's boss's father
- Joshna Fernando as Christina's sister
- Kaajal Pasupathi as Assistant Commissioner
- Chu Khoy Sheng as Roger
- Ducati Diavel as Raven
- Nakshathra Nagesh as school girl
- Alisha Abdullah as Don's assistant (guest appearance)
- Akshara Gowda as item number "Pondicherry"

== Production ==
AGS Entertainment announced that they were simultaneously producing six films in March 2013 and revealed one of those would be a "racy action script" featuring Atharvaa to be directed by newcomer Yuvraj Bose, a former assistant of Arivazhagan. Priya Anand was signed on to feature in the film in August 2013, while Lakshmi Rai and Johnny Tri Nguyen, previously seen in AR Murugadoss's 7 Aum Arivu, were selected to portray other roles. Writer Narsim debuted as a dialogue writer for the film.

In October 2013, the team moved on to film a schedule in Italy for 20 days, canning scenes and songs after finishing another schedule in Puducherry. In November 2013 it was reported that Lakshmi Rai was out of the project, and a relative newcomer, Joshna Fernando, was hired and he shot for some sequences and a song with the cast in the Italy schedule. In a turn of events, Lakshmi Rai began filming for the project again in March 2014. Akshara Gowda shot for a dance number in the film.

== Soundtrack ==
Irumbu Kuthirai

Soundtrack album by G. V. Prakash Kumar
- Released: 2014
- Genre: Feature film soundtrack
- Language: Tamil
- Label: Sony Music India
- Producer: G. V. Prakash Kumar

G. V. Prakash Kumar chronology
Saivam (2014)	Irumbu Kuthirai (2014)	Darling (2014)

No.	Title	Lyrics	Singer(s)	Length
1.	"Penne Penne"	Thamarai	G. V. Prakash Kumar, Bhavatharini, Yaazhini	6:00
2.	"Ange Ippo Enna Seigiraai (Inspired from Rihanna - We Found Love)"	Thamarai	Vijay Prakash, Mugdha Hasabnis, M. M. Manasi	4:45
3.	"Pondicherry"	Thamarai	A. R. Reihana, Priya Hemesh	3:30
4.	"Alay Paayum"	Thamarai	Vijay Prakash, Andrea Jeremiah	4:80
5.	"Hello Brother"	Pa. Vijay	Ranjith, Suchitra, Chinna Ponnu	5:45

== Critical reception ==
The Hindu wrote, "Yuvaraj Bose, does a lot of small things right...There is taste, restraint, and a strong sense of aesthetics. Everything belongs – except the songs, which are terrible speed breakers...The bigger problem with Irumbu Kuthirai is that it lacks a pulse. It’s okay that the early portions coast along with a nonchalant vibe, but this cannot sustain the latter parts that are about intense showdowns on Ducatis". The Times of India "Irumbu Kuthirai has been publicized as a bike racing film but what really works is the romance...The (...) sore point is the mood-killing songs. But, most importantly, the racing portions are a letdown. The role of the antagonist is underwritten and thus, we are never taken in by this part of the film". Sify wrote, "Irumbu Kuthirai in spite its rich production values and slick camerawork falls prey to a lot of compromises like half a dozen songs which pop up at regular intervals, the melodrama and romance in the large dose" and concluded that "it fails on the script level which Yuvraj Bose has tried to compensate with a glossy presentation". The New Indian Express wrote, "Irumbu Kuthirai's trailer promised much – a film with lots of action and thrill and bike racing stunts. But the film fails to match up to it due to its superficial take on both its emotional quotient and action quota...apart from a few impressively choreographed bike chase and fight scenes, there is not much going for the film".
