= Changathipoocha =

- DVD cover
- Directed by: S. P. Mahesh
- Written by: Shani Khader
- Produced by: Rasheed
- Starring: Jayasurya; Radhika
- Cinematography: Vipin Mohan
- Edited by: Raj Muhammad
- Music by: Ouseppachan
- Production company: Flying Films
- Distributed by: Emil and Eric
- Release date: 19 January 2007
- Running time: 150 minutes
- Country: India
- Language: Malayalam

Changathipoocha The Cat Friend is a 2007 Malayalam language romantic comedy film directed by S. P. Mahesh (in his directorial debut). It stars Jayasurya and Radhika in the lead roles.

== Plot ==
Changathipoocha tells the story of two aged brothers Sreedharan Nair, who is the Kunnathur Panchayath President and Raman Nair, the opposition leader who are constantly at loggerheads owing to differences of opinion regarding their ancestral property. Raman Nair is also known as 'Kuliru', because he always goes out without wearing shirt. But everyone else in their family, including Sreedharan Nair's daughter Priya and Raman Nair's daughter Sreedevi are close to each other, sharing every part of their family fun. The news about the return of their sister Bhanumathi, who had been away for years, creates shock to Raman Nair especially because Bhanumathi's share of the property is at present under his control and even the house he is living in rightfully belongs to her.

The other news to follow was that Bhanumathi's son on their way back proposes to marry one of his cousins, Priya or Sreedevi. Raman Nair expects that if Bhanumathi's son marries Priya, Sreedharan Nair's daughter, he would be losing all the wealth. So with the aid of Purushottaman Nair, who is Raman Nair's manager, they come up with a solution. They plan the entry of someone else as a hired lover who could be made to fall in love with Priya and thus to create more tension for Sreedharan Nair, even before the arrival of Bhanumathi and her son.

Thus arrives Sivankutty, who is entrusted with the job of making Priya fall in love with him, so that Raman Nair could score a victory over Sreedharan Nair. Sivan is actually the brother-in-law of Purushottaman Nair and owes a large amount of money to many people, who are constantly after him. Sivankutty takes up the 'job' to solve his financial problems. A mix-up takes place as Sivan who was to fall in love with Priya, accidentally falls for Sridevi.

In the end, after a series of comic confusions, Sivankutty marries Sridevi.

== Cast ==
- Jayasurya as Sivankutty
- Radhika as Sridevi
- Ramya Nambeeshan as Priya
- Jagathy Sreekumar as Raman Nair
- Nedumudi Venu as Sreedharan Nair
- Salim Kumar as Ayyappan
- Sudheesh as Kunjunni
- Kochu Preman as Purushottaman Nair
- Cochin Haneefa as Vasu
- Harisree Ashokan as Pappadam Rajappan
- Joemon Joshy as Jayasurya's Brother
- Manka Mahesh as Priya's mother
- Ambika Mohan as Thankamani, Sridevi's mother
- Geetha Nair as Sivankutty's mother
- Anoop Chandran as Manikandan
- Seema G. Nair as Janu / Tea shop owner

== Soundtrack ==
Changathipoocha

Soundtrack album by Ouseppachan
- Released: 2007
- Recorded: Satyam Audios
- Genre: World Music
- Label: Satyam Audios
- Producer: Flying Films

The music of Changathipoocha is given by Ouseppachan. The lyrics are by Gireesh Puthenchery. The film has two songs. The singers are Jayachandran, M. G. Sreekumar, Vineeth Sreenivasan and Manjari.

Track #	Song	Singer(s)
1	"Sararanthal"	Jayachandran
2	"Pokkiri Mamman Changathi"	M. G. Sreekumar
3	"Sararanthal"	Vineeth Sreenivasan, Manjari
