= Alisha Abdullah =

Indian racing driver

- Born: 24 July 1989 (age 36); Chennai, India
- Occupation: Motorsport
- Spouse: Naveen Devanraj (m. 2017)

Alisha Abdullah (born July 24, 1989) is an Indian racing driver. She is the country's first female national racing champion.

== Racing and other work ==
She started her racing career at the age of 10, when she started indoor Kart racing.

In 2016, she founded the Alisha Abdullah Racing Academy, through which she identifies talented racers to support.

In 2018, she was felicitated by President Ram Nath Kovind and the Minister of Women and Child Development, Maneka Sanjay Gandhi as the 'First Lady' to have embarked in the field of motorsports from India.

In July 2020, she was appointed as the Tamil Nadu State Women President of the National Human Rights Anti Crime and Anti Corruption Bureau.

== Political career ==
Abdullah joined the Tamil Nadu unit of the Bharatiya Janata Party in September 2022. After joining BJP, she stated that her goal is to become a Member of the parliament.

She recommends Hindi as a compulsory language in Tamil Nadu.

== Personal life ==
Her father RA Abdullah is also a famous bike racer and a seven-time national champion.

Abdullah got engaged to pilot Vell Naveen Devanraj in June 2016. She married him on 18 January 2017 in a private ceremony in Bali.

== Filmography ==
Year	Film	Role	Language	Notes	Ref.
2014	Irumbu Kuthirai	Villain's (Don) Assistant	Tamil	Guest appearance	
