= Maasi (film) =

2012 Indian film by G. Kicha

- Poster
- Directed by: G. Kitcha
- Written by: G. Kitcha
- Produced by: Kovai Mani
- Starring: Arjun; Archana Gupta
- Cinematography: Boopathy
- Edited by: Saleem
- Music by: Dhina
- Production company: Anbulaxmi Films
- Release date: 16 March 2012
- Country: India
- Language: Tamil

Maasi is a 2012 Tamil-language action film written and directed by G. Kitcha. This film stars Arjun and Archana Gupta in the lead roles, while Dheena composed the music. The film was released after much delay on 16 March 2012 and received negative reviews from critics.

== Plot ==
Inspector Maasilamani alias "Maasi" is an encounter specialist who gets entangled in gang-wars between Naaga and Nandha. Due to the gang wars, Maasi loses his family, and he decides to payback Naaga and Nanda's gang-wars and also eradicate all gangsters in the city of Chennai.

== Cast ==
- Arjun as Inspector Maasilamani aka Maasi, Encounter Specialist
- Archana as Lakshmi Maasilamani's wife
- Hema as Sruthi
- Kota Srinivasa Rao as Home Minister Paramasivam
- Pradeep Rawat as Naaga
- Ponnambalam as Nandha
- Satya Prakash as Naaga's Brother
- Mayilswamy as Thief
- Bala Singh
- Santhana Bharathi as Maasilamani's Corrupt Senior Officer
- Mahadevan as Maasilamani's Senior Officer, who helps Maasi
- Shakuntala as Gangamma
- Kalairani as Maasilamani's mother
- Pandu
- Gowtham as Balu, Police Officer in Maasilamani's Encounter squad

== Production ==
Arjun signed on to appear in Kicha's film titled Kallan in March 2009, which would see him play a police officer. The title was later changed to Maasi after the lead character and the film's launch was held on 1 April 2009 at a private club in the presence of the members of the cast and crew. The film's audio launch was held on 26 May 2010 with actor Karthi and Hansraj Saxena of Sun Pictures releasing the disk in a grand scale function. At a press conference, Kicha announced that two of his police films Bhavani and Maasi would see back to back releases in July 2010, though the deadline passed without further news. The film was set to release in late August 2011 alongside Arjun's other film Mankatha, but ran into a legal tussle with the makers of Idhudhanda Police – 2. The team of that film claimed they bought the remake rights of the Hindi film, Risk and based their Idhudhanda Police – 2 on it. They appealed that Maasi had copied almost 75 per cent of the scenes from the Hindi film that they were remaking and obtained an order in Hyderabad City Civil Court to stay the release of the film, and subsequently caused a delay. The film was further delayed in early 2012, when the director was arrested for failing to return an advance payment he had received from another producer, hence Tamil Kumaran sought a stay on the film.

== Soundtrack ==
Soundtrack was composed by Dhina, with lyrics written by Dhina and Yugabharathi (Unakkaaga Unakkaga).

- "Kandene" – Hariharan, Sadhana Sargam
- "Ondikondi" – Rita
- "Unakkaga" – Udit Narayan, Sowmya Raoh
- "Singanadai" – Ananthu
- "Naan Paartha" – Shankar Mahadevan, Saindhavi
- "Kandene" – Hariharan, Anbulakshmi

== Release ==
The film opened after three years of production in a few screens across Tamil Nadu on 16 March 2012 to negative reviews. Sify.com labelled the film as "tedious", though stated "watch it if you're a fan of Arjun, he is charismatic, look fit at this age and has an alluring appeal that lifts this film considerably." The Times of India criticised that film failed in all departments. The Hindu wrote "The action king doesn't need a Maasi to live up to the sobriquet".
