= Meenathil Thalikettu =

1998 Indian Malayalam-language film

- Directed by: Rajan Sankaradi
- Screenplay by: A. K. Sajan; A. K. Santhosh
- Story by: Lal Jose
- Produced by: Prem Prakash; Sajan Varghese
- Starring: Dileep; Tejali Ghanekar; Thilakan
- Cinematography: Sanjeev Shankar
- Edited by: Venugopal
- Music by: Ouseppachen
- Release date: 7 January 1998
- Country: India
- Language: Malayalam

Meenathil Thalikettu (transl. Wedding in Meenam) is a 1998 Indian Malayalam-language comedy drama film directed by Rajan Sankaradi and written by A. K. Sajan and A. K. Santhosh from a story by Lal Jose. It stars Dileep, Tejali Ghanekar, Thilakan, Zeenath, and Jagathy Sreekumar. The plot follows Omanakkuttan, a 23-year-old, who is still in high school, who has to marry his friend's sister, Malu, under pressure.

Meenathil Thalikettu was based on an idea that occurred to Dileep in which "a schoolboy gets married due to circumstances". This was further developed into a story by Lal Jose. The music was composed by Ouseppachan.

The film was remade in Kannada as Kanasina Loka (2004).

== Plot ==
Omanakkuttan is 22 years old and is still in Higher Secondary school, a fact which angers his father, Govindan. He was always supported by his teacher and neighbour Kaimal who is Govindan's best friend. One day Omanakkuttan sought kaimal's help to get permission from his father to attend his friend's sister's marriage. His life takes a turn when he goes to his friend, Sudhi's sister's marriage. Due to certain circumstances, Sudhi's sister Malathy's marriage was stopped due to dowry problems. Omanakkuttan fights for his friend's pride but due to Sudhi's uncle's compulsion he ends up marrying Malathi. This angers his father and Omanakkuttan ran away from home. Later due to Kaimal's intervention Omanakkuttan learns that his wife was accepted into family by his mother and sister. However, angry Govindan allows them to stay in his home and always keeping an eye on Malathi and his son to prevent them being together. He tries to divert his son's focus away from Malu and forces him to study for his final board exams. However, Omanakkuttan succeeds in uniting with his wife. Malu becomes pregnant, and both Omanakkuttan and Malu are thrown out of the house since Omanakkuttan doesn't agree to abort his baby according to his father's wish. Then he finds many jobs to look after Malu and finally both of them settles in a small house where Malu was 7 months pregnant. Malu's own uncle who is a miser learns about their situation and knowingly leaves them alone. One day Kaimal meets them in a pathetic situation and helps with some money. When time moves Malu got pregnancy pain and was admitted to hospital, but Omanakkuttan was not able to meet the financial needs. He then goes out and gets into trouble due to his master's complaint that he stolen money where Omanakkuttan saved the money from long time. While coming back after solving problems he finds that money was paid in hospital. Kaimal then tells him all the money he received from him was actually from Omanakkuttan's father Govindan. Then Malu gives birth to a baby and everyone unites.

== Cast ==
- Dileep as Omanakkuttan / Moothappa
- Tejali Ghanekar as Malathi / Malu, Omanakuttan's Wife
- Thilakan as Govindan Nambeeshan, Omanakuttan's Father
- Jagathy Sreekumar as Kaimal Mash, Omanakuttan's Mentor
- Zeenath as Sharada, Omanakuttan's Mother
- Baby Ambili as Ambili / Veeppakkutti, Omanakkuttan's Sister
- Janardhanan as Kunjiraman, Malu's Uncle
- Kalabhavan Mani as Achutty, Kunjiraman's Son
- Krishna Prasad as Sudhi, Malu's Brother
- Oduvil Unnikrishnan as Doctor
- Sukumari as Durga
- Sankaradi as Durga's Husband
- Adoor Bhawani as Kaimal's Grandmother
- Yadhu Krishnan as Omanakkuttan's Friend
- Jose Prakash as Company Manager
- Vijay Menon as Rozario
- Thesni Khan as Nancy, Rozario's Wife
- Santhakumari as Malathi's Mother
- Elias Babu as Bridegroom's Father
- Shobha Sankar as The women in Temple
- Meena Ganesh as Janu
- Omana Ouseph as Malu's Aunt
- Nandhu Poduval as Flower Seller
- Abraham Koshy as Police Officer

== Soundtrack ==
The film's soundtrack contains eight songs, all composed by Ouseppachan, with lyrics by Gireesh Puthenchery.

| # | Title | Singer(s) |
|---|---|---|
| 1 | "Aaromale" | K. J. Yesudas |
| 2 | "Dooreyoru Thaaram" | K. J. Yesudas, K. S. Chitra |
| 3 | "Dooreyoru Thaaram" (F) | K. S. Chitra |
| 4 | "Kaanaakkoottin" | M. G. Sreekumar, Reju Joseph |
| 5 | "Maarivillin" | M. G. Sreekumar |
| 6 | "Maarivillinmel" | K. J. Yesudas, Sujatha Mohan |
| 7 | "Oru Poovine" | K. J. Yesudas, Sujatha Mohan |
| 8 | "Oru Poovine" | Sujatha Mohan, Chorus |
