= Aatha Un Koyilile =

- Theatrical release poster
- Directed by: Kasthuri Raja
- Written by: Kasthuri Raja
- Produced by: K. Prabhakaran
- Starring: Selva; Kasthuri
- Cinematography: K. B. Ahmed
- Edited by: L. Kesavan
- Music by: Deva
- Production company: Anbalaya Films
- Release date: 10 May 1991
- Running time: 135 minutes
- Country: India
- Language: Tamil

Aatha Un Koyilile (transl. Aatha, in your temple) is a 1991 Indian Tamil-language drama film written and directed by Kasthuri Raja. The film stars newcomers Selva and Kasthuri, with newcomer Ravi Rahul, Vinodhini, Janagaraj, Vinu Chakravarthy, K. Prabhakaran, Vadivelu, and Senthil playing supporting roles. It was released on 10 May 1991. The film was remade in Telugu as Prema Vijetha (1992).

== Plot ==
Pandi is a shy young man. He is the son of the village's bigwig Azhagarsamy. Pandi slowly falls in love with the lovely village girl Easwari who, unlike him, is from a poor family. When the village blacksmith Marudhu learns about their love affair, he warns Pandi about Azhagarsamy's dark side.

In the past, Kasthuri, her parents, and Ramaiah lived together in their big house. Maruthu worked in their house and had much respect for Kasthuri. However, when Kasthuri's cousin Durairasu entered their house in order to marry Kasthuri, problems started. Kasthuri's father halfheartedly accepted the proposal as per the village custom, despite knowing that Durairasu was a bad person. However, Kasthuri refused the proposal and revealed she wanted to marry Maruthu, who was from another caste. Kasthuri's family accepted her wish, and she married Marudhu. At the village court the village heads did not accept the marriage because of the caste difference and Azhagarsamy ordered Kasthuri's father to kill his daughter to restore the village's honour. Later that night, Kasthuri's father fed Kasthuri a meal which he had poisoned. Marudhu came to save Kasthuri, but Durairasu and his henchmen stopped him. Marudhu beats them all, but was too late to save Kasthuri.

Pandi loses hope in being able to marry Easwari, and the lovers decide to kill themselves. The villagers intervene just in time, and Azhagarsamy surprisingly accepts for the marriage in front of the villagers. Later, Azhagarsamy forces Kaliappan to poison his daughter Easwari. Marudhu comes in time to save her, and he encourages Ramaiah to fight against the caste fanatic Azhagarsamy. Pandi and Easwari then marry. Kasthuri's father, Ramaiah, Kaliappan, and Marudhu collaborate to destroy Azhagarsamy, forcing him to drink poison for his crimes.

== Cast ==
- Selva as Marudhu
- Kasthuri as Kasthuri
- Ravi Rahul as Pandi
- Vinodhini as Easwari
- Janagaraj as Kaliappan
- Vinu Chakravarthy as Ramaiah
- K. Prabhakaran as Azhagarsamy
- Vadivelu as Appu
- Senthil as Pichumani
- M. N. Rajam as Kasthuri's mother
- T. K. S. Chandran as Kasthuri's father
- K. S. Selvaraj as Durairasu
- Sevvanthi as Dhanam
- Chitraguptan as Nellikunju
- Pradeep Raj

== Production ==
Aatha Un Koyilile is the acting debut for Selva and Kasthuri.

== Soundtrack ==
The music was composed by Deva, with lyrics written by Kalidasan.

| Song | Singer(s) | Duration |
|---|---|---|
| "Ele Elanguyile" | S. P. Balasubrahmanyam, K. S. Chithra | 3:59 |
| "Pombalaya Madhikavenum" | Gangai Amaran | 4:42 |
| "Chinnanchiru Poove" | Mano, S. Janaki | 4:26 |
| "Othayadi Paadhayile" (male) | S. P. Balasubrahmanyam | 5:03 |
| "Kaadhal Kiligale" | Krishna Chandher | 4:40 |
| "Thaimaasam Vandirichi" | Deva | 0:59 |
| "Othayadi Paadhayile" (female) | Jikki | 5:03 |
| "Vandi Varudu" | Swarnalatha | 1:13 |
| "Othayadi Paadhayile" (reprised) | Malaysia Vasudevan | 0:34 |
| "Thaimaasam Vanduruchi" | Swarnalatha | 0:59 |
| "Othayadi Paadhayile" (duet) | S. P. Balasubrahmanyam, Jikki | 5:04 |
| "Maari Muthumaari" | Swarnalatha, Malaysia Vasudevan | 5:13 |

== Critical reception ==
N. Krishnaswamy of The Indian Express said, "Kasthoori Raja ties up various strands of the narrative well racing to the climax".
