= Naan Sigappu Manithan (2014 film) =

2014 Indian film by Thiru

- Theatrical release poster
- Directed by: Thiru
- Written by: Thiru
- Produced by: Vishal; Ronnie Screwvala; Siddharth Roy Kapoor
- Starring: Vishal; Lakshmi Menon; Ineya
- Cinematography: Richard M. Nathan
- Edited by: Ruben
- Music by: G. V. Prakash Kumar
- Production companies: UTV Motion Pictures; Vishal Film Factory
- Distributed by: Vendhar Movies
- Release date: 11 April 2014
- Running time: 153 minutes
- Country: India
- Language: Tamil

Naan Sigappu Manithan (transl. I am a Red Man) is a 2014 Tamil-language action thriller film directed by Thiru and produced by UTV Motion Pictures. Co-produced by Vishal, the film stars himself in the leading role with Lakshmi Menon and Ineya in pivotal roles, while G. V. Prakash Kumar composed the film's music. The film deals with narcolepsy. It was released on 11 April 2014, during the Puthandu weekend.

== Plot ==
In the middle of the night, Indhiran, accompanied by his friends Sathish and Karuna, purchases a gun illegally from a local gangster. Back home, Indhiran stares at his wish list and recalls his past.

Since childhood, Indhiran has narcolepsy, a rare disorder which makes him fall asleep whenever his emotions reach an extreme level and keeps him from living an ordinary life. He needs to be accompanied constantly. Companies hesitate to hire him, although he has excelled in academics, and he cannot impregnate women since he falls asleep during sex. However, he can still hear whatever is being said while he sleeps. Indhiran creates a bucket list with goals that he wants to achieve on his own. One day, he ventures out alone, which was one of his goals. When he is almost hit by a vehicle while crossing the road, his fear mounts, and he falls asleep in the middle of the road.

A passerby makes him pose as an orphaned corpse and gathers money from onlookers for his burial. Meera, who passes by, takes pity and shells out almost 5000 rupees. Later, Meera meets Indhiran in a shopping mall and faints from shock upon seeing him alive. After clearing the misunderstanding, they start dating and fall for each other. Meera makes one of Indhiran's dreams come true (i.e., getting a kiss from a beautiful woman by kissing him), but her father opposes their marriage as Indhiran cannot stay awake during sex. Meera urges Indhiran to find a way to stay awake. It dawns on Indhiran that he had never fallen asleep while showering. Believing that her father will accept Indhiran only when his sexual potency is proved, Meera and Indhiran have sex in his swimming pool, resulting in Meera becoming pregnant.

On a late-night drive, Meera drives her car onto an under-construction bridge. Another car hits Meera's car, and the shock makes Indhiran doze off while Meera is brutally attacked and raped by unknown thugs. Indhiran can hear the entire ordeal but remains asleep and sheds a tear for being helpless. Meera falls into a coma, her child is aborted, and a heartbroken Indhiran vows to exact revenge on the perpetrators.

In the present, deciding to exact vengeance alone, Indhiran fails to testify to the police. He begins to question people who knew Meera. Inquiring Meera's friends, Indhiran first suspects Karthik, a rich but ill-mannered guy whose marriage proposal was rejected by Meera. Indhiran confronts him, but he denies any knowledge about the incident, even offering to help Indhiran if required. Indhiran realises that the sound of sudden obstacles makes him sleep. To prevent this, he buys a portable audio player and uses it with full volume. A transformer explosion right next to him has no effect on him because of the music, and thus, he realises his newfound advantage.

Indhiran also reaches out to a meditation teacher who teaches him to stay calm and be immune to shock by anticipating the event beforehand. Indhiran stays awake a whole night and tries to control his sleep by standing between two loud trains with the audio player at full volume. After obtaining control, Indhiran gets information from a sympathetic police officer regarding attack cases to find a lead. He remembers one of the thugs' names, Sekhar, and his ringtone, while the police find out that the criminals drove a red car. Indhiran stumbles upon a red car at a petrol bunk and inquires the driver, who claims that the car was with a mechanic named Sekhar on the day the crime occurred.

At the workshop, Indhiran spots the mechanic, who tries to run upon recognising him, and a chase ensues, leading them to a building under construction. Informed by Sathish, Karuna arrives there and kills Sekhar. He then injures himself to convince Indhiran that he was assaulted by Sekhar, who escaped the scene. He is then admitted for treatment.

Past: Married to Karuna for two years, Kavitha was dissatisfied with her drunkard husband. She begins an affair with Aravind, a wealthy friend of Karuna. He spends a lot of money buying her expensive gifts. Indhiran gains knowledge of this and advises Kavitha against it. It turns out that Karuna, to realise his ambitions of running a business in the US, had been using his wife to manipulate Aravind. Citing Indhiran's confrontation, Kavitha lied to Aravind that if Karuna learns of their affair, he would kill them both. She suggested that the only way to solve it once and for all is to arrange ₹ 20 million that Karuna needs to settle in the US. With him gone, they could enjoy being together. Aravind agreed to finance Karuna out of his lust for her.

Later, when Karuna and Kavitha celebrate their success, Indhiran drops by unexpectedly. Indhiran suspects them and informs Aravind, who confronts the couple. When Aravind realises that he had been cheated, he hits Kavitha in a fit of rage, and she dies after the hit lands her head on the corner of a cupboard. Infuriated, Karuna kills Aravind. He arranges for disposing of the two bodies with the help of the thugs and lies to Indhiran that Kavitha has eloped with Aravind. Since he assumed that Indhiran was responsible for Kavitha's death, Karuna had planned to take vengeance by making him suffer the same way and requested the thugs to attack Meera.

Present: The remaining thugs insist that Karuna bring Indhiran to the same place where Sekhar was killed. Finding out that it was Karuna who had killed Sekhar, they beat him up. When Indhiran arrives, the thugs remove the audio player from Indhiran, who gets an adrenaline rush and dozes off. While the thugs are thrashing him, one of them breaks a water pump, which splashes water all over and awakens Indhiran, who kills them all, except Karuna. Indhiran says that he saw Karuna killing Sekhar. When Indhiran questions Karuna why he sent thugs to attack Meera, Karuna angrily tells him that it was revenge for Kavitha's death, which was caused by Indhiran telling Aravind the truth.

Karuna angrily attacks Indhiran, and Indhiran retaliates by hitting Karuna violently. Despite feeling bad for his friend and being hesitant to kill him due to their close friendship, he remembers Meera and kills Karuna by kicking him into a steel bar. With all his wishes fulfilled, Indhiran has a new wish to help Meera recover soon. The final scene shows Indhiran hugging Meera, who is tearful hearing him, showing that she is definitely recovering.

== Cast ==
- Vishal as Indhiran
- Lakshmi Menon as Meera (Voice dubbed by Deepa Venkat)
- Ineya as Kavitha (Voice dubbed by Suchitra)
- Saranya Ponvannan as Sumathi
- Jayaprakash as Meera's father
- Sunder Ramu as Karuna
- Jagan as Sathish
- Chethan Cheenu as Aravind
- Prinz Nithik as Guna
- Rishi as Karthik
- Mayilsamy as Passerby
- Aarthi as Periyanayaki
- V. I. S. Jayapalan as Kottaiperumal
- Pyramid Natarajan as Doctor
- Nisha Krishnan as Gayathri, Meera's friend
- Shyamili Sukumar

== Production ==
Naan Sigappu Manithan is director Thiru and actor Vishal's third consecutive film together. The idea for the film came to Thiru from noticing his friend sleep chronically due to narcolepsy. The title Naan Sigappu Manithan was derived from a 1985 film after obtaining permission from its producer Atluri Purnachandra Rao. Principal photography began on 29 November 2013, and wrapped in March 2014.

== Soundtrack ==
Naan Sigappu Manithan

Soundtrack album by G. V. Prakash Kumar
- Released: 13 March 2014
- Genre: Film soundtrack
- Language: Tamil
- Label: Sony Music South
- Producer: G. V. Prakash Kumar

G. V. Prakash Kumar chronology
Nimirndhu Nil / Janda Pai Kapiraju (2013)	Naan Sigappu Manithan (2014)	Saivam (2014)

The soundtrack album was composed by G. V. Prakash Kumar, with lyrics by Na. Muthukumar. The tracklist was unveiled in February 2014, while the audio launch took place on 13 March 2014.

Track listing
No.	Title	Singer(s)	Length
1.	"Yelelo"	G. V. Prakash Kumar, Megha, Chorus	4:55
2.	"Lovely Ladies"	Gana Bala, Vijay Prakash, Megha, Aryan Dinesh, G. V. Prakash Kumar	4:10
3.	"Penne Oh Penne"	Vandana Srinivasan, Al-Rufian	4:41
4.	"Idhayam Unnai Theduthe"	G. V. Prakash Kumar, Saindhavi	5:59
5.	"Aadu Machi" (Remix of Lovely Ladies)	DJ Vijay Chawla	5:06
6.	"A Restless Soul" (Theme)	–	3:14
Total length:			28:05

== Release ==
Naan Sigappu Manithan was released on 11 April 2014, during the Puthandu weekend. Vendhar Movies distributed the film in Tamil Nadu. Post-release, seven minutes of the film were cut, with the edited version playing in theatres from 17 April.

== Critical reception ==
Baradwaj Rangan wrote for The Hindu, "The hero is a narcoleptic, and this aspect is not just a cool marketing gimmick. It has been integrated into the very fibre of the film...The first half is strong..the director, Thiru, displays a lot of control in scenes that could have erupted into melodrama....And then we enter the second half, and the film goes haywire...Still, given the general state of hero-oriented Tamil cinema, where a hollow kind of masculinity is endlessly celebrated, it’s nice to root for a hero who isn’t a slacker but a brilliant student, and who sits down with his pals for a cup of tea, rather than booze, and who gets rejected by a girl his mother sets him up with". Sify stated, "Thiru is able to make an engrossing actor driven entertainer without any super hero gimmicks. Naan Sigappu Manithan is an gripping entertainer which is not run-of-the-mill".

M. Suganth of The Times of India gave it 3/5 and wrote, "There is intelligence in this script...but Thiru slips quite a bit in the second half as he goes for one twist too many in explaining why Meera is attacked. What we are left with is a feeling of mild discontent, as a promising premise is compromised for a generic revenge drama". S. Saraswathi of Rediff.com gave 3/5 and stated, "Naan Sigappu Manithan is a riveting revenge drama with an honest narrative, excellent performances and many entertaining twists and turns". Anupama Subramanian of Deccan Chronicle gave 3/5 and wrote, "Overall, a gripping entertainer with an unusual theme.". IANS gave 2.5/5 and wrote, "NSM stands testimonial to the fact that a simple story that has been milked dry over the years can still be narrated in myriad engaging ways. One such way is what we see in this film, which is not an exceptional thriller, but definitely has the potential to keep you hooked." Gautaman Bhaskaran of Hindustan Times gave 2/5 and stated, "Despite a novel subject, Naan Sigappu Manithan fails to deliver".
