= Hemachandran (actor) =

Indian film actor

- Born: 23 September; Chennai, Tamil Nadu, India
- Occupations: Actor, Producer
- Years active: 2004-present

Hemachandran is an Indian actor and producer, who works predominantly in the Tamil film and television industries. He made his acting debut with the 2004 Tamil film Kavithai, in which he was credited as Vamsi. He subsequently starred in several films including Krishnaveni Panjaalai.

== Career ==
Hemachandran made his acting debut in the 2004 Tamil romantic action film Kavithai, directed by Kicha. He was credited under the name Vamsi and starred opposite Chaya Singh. He subsequently appeared in the film Puzhal in 2010.

In 2012, Hemachandran played the lead role of Nanda in Nanda Nanditha, the Tamil version of a bilingual film produced in Tamil and Telugu based on the Kannada film Nanda Loves Nanditha. He played a supporting role in the Telugu version. He subsequently appeared in the thriller film Suzhal, released in 2012 co-starring Fariz and Atul Kulkarni.

The same year, he played the role of Kathir in Krishnaveni Panjaalai, directed by Dhanapal Padmanabhan. The film released to positive reviews with critics praising the chemistry of the lead cast. The film was in several time periods including the 1950s and he worked in a mill for a week before filming.

Hemachandran has also worked in television productions. He runs a production company named Goldenmoon Productions and its television production Nachiyarpuram, which was broadcast on Zee Tamil.

== Filmography ==
=== Films ===
Year	Film	Role	Notes
2004	Kavithai	Sakthi	Credited as Vamsi
2010	Puzhal	John	
2012	Nanda Nanditha	Nanda	
2012	Suzhal	Bharath	
2012	Krishnaveni Panjaalai	Kathir	

=== Television ===
As producer

Year	Title	Channel
2019–2020	Nachiyarpuram	Zee Tamil
