= Siragugal =

- Written by: Radhika
- Directed by: Manobala; Radhika
- Starring: Radhika; Vikram
- Music by: Dhina
- Country of origin: India
- Original language: Tamil

Production
- Producer: Kalanithi Maran

Original release
- Release: 1999

Siragugal (transl. Wings) is a 1999 Indian Tamil-language television drama film written by Radhika, produced by Kalanithi Maran, and co-directed by Manobala and Radhika. Set in London, the film stars Radhika and Vikram, while Devan plays a supporting role. It was released directly on Sun TV and had a positive response.

== Plot ==
Valli is a homemaker who lives with her husband Vishwa and children, Aishwarya and Kousalya, in London. Vishwa has no affection towards Valli or his children. He always insults and hurts his wife every time he gets a chance. Yet, Valli bears everything for her children. Aishu always worries her mother with her adolescent nature and activities, never caring about her mother's feelings and hurting her just as much as her father. However, Valli is more bothered about the culture and traditions that her daughter does not care to follow.

Chandrasekar is a businessman who lives in London with his daughters, Deepa and Shilpa. He lives separately from his wife, who was more concerned with a Western lifestyle and unwilling to change her nature and live with him. Deepa and Aishwarya are good friends. One day, both of them go on a date with some boys without their parents' knowledge and meet with an accident. Valli tries to contact her husband, who is out of station, and finds that he is having an illegal affair with another woman, Lavanya. Vishwa is upset about this incident, and also because Valli had come to know about his extramarital affair. He leaves his family on a small quarrel with Valli, who begs him to pardon her for whatever she did. Vishwa tells Valli that she is not fit to be even his servant-maid. Aishwariya finds that the root cause of all these incidents is herself, and in self-pity, she does not take steps to recover. Valli, who wants nothing but her daughter's recovery, goes to Lavanya's house to convince Vishwa to return home, but Lavanya insults her and asks Valli to leave her property.

Valli is shocked by the series of events in her life, but wants to survive in London. Chandrsekar urges Valli to start her own catering business as she is a talented cook, and they soon start a restaurant together. Meanwhile, Aishwarya recovers from her accident. One day, she finds that her father is with his mistress and hates him forever. Vishwa resigns from his job due to a promotion with a transfer to Australia so he can be with Lavanya. However, having spent all his money to settle his debts, he begs Lavanya for money. This makes her ignore him to the point where she starts going out with other guys. Chandrsekar wants to marry Valli and start a new family with both their daughters. He proposes to Valli, but she does not reciprocate. Vishwa sees his wife rising to a good position. He wants to use this opportunity to make money. Initially, he pretends to her that he feels insecure and wants to join them. Valli agrees and asks him to come home. Vishwa comes home, but his nature has not changed. He dominates Valli and wants to take control of her and the money.

When Chandrasekar and Valli discuss expanding their business, he insults him and asks him to get out. Valli, realizing that living with Vishwa will be another nightmare, asks him to move out of the house. Then Vishwa kidnaps his own daughter Kousalya and instructs Valli to come to a temple. Valli rushes to get her daughter back. Vishwa makes demands to free his daughter, but Valli replies that their marital relationship started at the temple of their homeland and shall be ended in this London temple. She is not interested in having any relationships and does not want to deviate from her culture. What she wants is to bring up her daughters with cultural values. Chandrasekar understands that her decision was not only for Vishwa but also for him. Chandrsekar reunites with his wife, and Valli takes her daughter back with her. When Vishwa calls for Kousalya, she tells him not to come home forever.

== Cast ==
- Radhika as Valli
- Vikram as Chandrasekar
- Devan as Vishwa
- Rayaan as Kousalya
- Joshna Fernando as Shilpa

== Production ==
Kalanithi Maran had requested Radhika to consider making a short film to be aired on Sun TV, and the feature film Siragugal subsequently materialised with Manobala signed as director. After he left the project midway, Radhika became the director. Vikram agreed to appear in the film, after his other film during the period, Sethu (1999), was unable to find a distributor. Joshna Fernando, a cousin of Radhika's, was added to the cast to portray Vikram's daughter. The film was shot in fifteen days in London.

== Soundtrack ==
The soundtrack was composed by Dhina. He later remade the song "Uyire" as "Vayasa Vayasa" for the Telugu film Adrustam (2002).

- Uyire Uyire - Dr. Narayanan

== Legacy ==
The film's woman-centric plot has meant that reviewers drew comparison to the film, following the release of the Jyothika-starrer, 36 Vayadhinile (2015).
