= Nethaji =

- VCD cover
- Directed by: Murthy Krishna
- Written by: Murthy Krishna
- Produced by: G. Ramesh; G. Suresh
- Starring: Sarathkumar; Lisa Ray
- Cinematography: S. Muthu Ganesh
- Edited by: V. Uthaya Sankaran
- Music by: Vidyasagar
- Production company: G.K Films International
- Release date: 10 November 1996
- Running time: 150 minutes
- Country: India
- Language: Tamil

Nethaji (/neɪθɑːdʒɪ/: transl. Respected Leader) (Note: Also the title character.) is a 1996 Indian Tamil-language action film written and directed by Murthy Krishna (later known as Kicha) in his debut. The film stars Sarathkumar and Lisa Ray. It was released on 10 November 1996.

== Plot ==
Karunamurthy, an honest home minister, is forced to help terrorists kill the current governor to save his daughter Priya. Nethaji, an upright journalist, runs a newspaper called "India" and falls in love with Priya. Baba is a terrorist who smuggles arms with his right-hand Dharma. Nethaji saves the scientist Shivashankari from terrorists, and Charan, a police officer, congrats Nethaji and arrests Baba. Dharma hurts Nethaji's sister and niece Ammu and later kidnaps the latter. Dharma threatens Nethaji to kill Ammu, and Nethaji is forced to kidnap Shivashankari. Nethaji kidnaps Shivashankari and saves Ammu, and later, Charan arrests him. The rest of story is how Nethaji will be able to prove himself innocent and punish the terrorists.

== Cast ==
- Sarathkumar as Nethaji
- Lisa Ray as Priya
- Manivannan as Mani
- Babu Antony as Baba
- Charan Raj as ACP Charan
- Kitty as Karuna Murthy
- Senthil
- Jyothi Meena
- Vimalraj as Dharma
- Manimala as Shivashankari
- Sudha as Nethaji's sister
- Baby Nikitha as Ammu
- CID Sakunthala

== Production ==
The film marked the directorial debut of Murthy Krishna, who used the screen name Kicha for his subsequent ventures. Antara Mali was originally chosen as the lead actress; however she got a chance to act in Hindi films and left the film uninformed, thus she was replaced by Lisa Ray.

== Soundtrack ==
The music was composed by Vidyasagar, with lyrics written by Vaali.

Singers	Song	Duration
"Holey Holey Chinchilei"	Vidyasagar, Swarnalatha	5:14
"Machamunna Machamthan"	Vidyasagar, Gopal Rao, Sindhu	5:01
"My Dear My Dear"	Anuradha Sriram, Febi Mani, Fiji Mani, Pop Shalini	5:07
"Nerunga Nerunga"	S. P. Balasubrahmanyam, S. Janaki	4:52
"Raappothu"	Anuradha Sriram	5:06

== Critical reception ==
R. P. R. of Kalki felt there were too many plots and the screenplay crosses from continent to continent. K. N. Vijiyan of New Straits Times wrote, "Murthi's directorial debut is marred by glaring mistakes made in the storyline so much so that it becomes implausible and leaves the audience very frustrated".
