= Viraivil Isai =

2015 Indian film by V. S. Prabhakaran

- Official poster
- Directed by: V. S. Prabhakaran
- Starring: Mahendran; Dilip Rogger; Sanjay Shankar; Shruti Ramakrishnan; Arpana
- Cinematography: Shiva
- Edited by: Yuresh Kumar
- Music by: M. S Ram
- Release date: 31 October 2015
- Country: India
- Language: Tamil

Viraivil Isai (transl. Music coming soon) is a 2015 Indian Tamil-language drama film directed by V. S. Prabhakaran and stars Mahendran, Dilip Rogger, Sanjay Shankar, Shruti Ramakrishnan and Arpana.

== Cast ==
- Mahendran as Susi
- Dilip Rogger as Ram
- Sanjay Shankar as Shankar
- Shruti Ramakrishnan as Lekha
- Arpana as Kavya
- Delhi Ganesh as a tea stall owner

== Production ==
The film's director worked under G. N. R. Kumaravelan. Mahendran plays a man who abandons his girlfriend to become a film director. The film was shot at Kodambakkam.

== Reception ==
Malini Mannath of The New Indian Express wrote that "Neither meaningful nor entertaining, It’s a film that has nothing to offer a viewer". M. Suganth of The Times of India said that "The story might seem intriguing, but the film actually takes quite an effort to sit through".
