= Chandamama (1999 film) =

- Audio CD cover
- Directed by: Murali Krishnan
- Written by: Story : Muralikrishnan, Script : Rajan Kiriyath
- Produced by: Preman; Sabu Cherian
- Starring: Kunchako Boban; Tejali Ghanekar; Sudheesh; Kalabhavan Navas; Jagathi Sreekumar; Mayoori
- Cinematography: Venu
- Edited by: T. R. Sekhar; Gourisakar
- Music by: Ouseppachan
- Production company: Suvarna rekha creations
- Distributed by: Shogun films
- Release date: 10 March 1999
- Running time: 150 Minutes
- Country: India
- Language: Malayalam

Chandamama is a 1999 ( ചന്ദാമാമ )Indian Malayalam-language Black comedy film directed by Murali Krishnan and written by Rajan Kiriyath, starring Kunchako Boban, Tejali Ghanekar, Jagathi Sreekumar, Sudheesh and Kalabhavan Navas. It is loosely based on 1989 American comedy film Weekend at Bernie's directed by Ted Kotcheff.

== Plot ==
Three friends, Unni, Dasan and Monayi, find their boss Eapachan murdered by hired killers. Believing that people will suspect them for the murder, they present the boss's dead body as if he is alive. In the end they find out who the murderer is and get him arrested.

== Cast ==
- Kunchako Boban as Unni
- Sudheesh as Dasan
- Kalabhavan Navas as Pullepadi Monayi
- Tejali Ghanekar as Maya
- Mayoori as Annie
- Jagathi Sreekumar as Eappachan
- Siddique as C.I Mathew Vasiparamban
- Janardanan as Thampy
- Harisree Asokan as Bhaskaran
- Cochin Haneefa as Natwarlal/Nanappan
- Oduvil Unnikrishnan as Bullet Achan
- C. I. Paul as Vakkachan
- Kalpana as Kochammini
- N. F. Varghese as Mampully
- Mamta Kulkarni special appearance "Rojaappoo Kavilathu"

== Soundtrack ==
The film's music was composed by Ouseppachan, with lyrics penned by Kaithapram. The title track, which was programmed by Harris Jayaraj, became popular.

Soundtrack listing
#	Title	Singer(s)
1	Aakaashakkottayile	Malaysia Vasudevan, Ouseppachan
2	Chandamaama	M. G. Sreekumar, K. S. Chithra
3	Chiriyoonjaal Kombil (M)	K. J. Yesudas
4	Chiriyoonjaalkkombil (F)	K. S. Chithra
5	Rojaappoo Kavilathu (D)	Unni Menon, Sujatha Mohan
6	Rojaappoo Kavilathu (F)	Sujatha Mohan
7	Rojaappoo Kavilathu (Violin)	Ouseppachan
8	Unaru Oru Kumbil V1	K. J. Yesudas
9	Unaru Oru Kumbil V2	M. G. Sreekumar, Chorus
