= Mitta Miraasu =

2001 film by Kalanjiyam

- Poster
- Directed by: Kalanjiyam
- Produced by: CR Karunanidhi; N Rajendran
- Starring: Prabhu; Roja
- Edited by: B. Lenin; V. T. Vijayan
- Music by: Aslam Mustafa
- Release date: 5 October 2001
- Country: India
- Language: Tamil

Mitta Miraasu is a 2001 Indian Tamil-language action drama film directed by Kalanjiyam. The film stars Prabhu and Roja, while Napoleon, Alex, Ravi Rahul, Mumtaj and Vadivelu play supporting roles.

== Plot ==
Chellaiya has two missions in life. The first is to remove the taint on the family name and expose the man behind his family's misfortunes. The second is to make his younger sibling a lawyer so that it will help him in achieving the first mission. The villain of the piece is Chellaiya's uncle Masilamani, who had turned the villagers against Chellaiya's father Singaperumal. Humiliated by the same people who had revered him once, Singaperumal dies of shock soon after (a laborious death scene). A few decades have passed since the incident, but Chellaiya seems nowhere near to fulfilling his mission, nor has Masilamani given up his wicked ways. In fact, Masilamani is stronger now, what with his two sons grown up and matching their father step-to-step in his villainy. The trio has no redeeming qualities. Many clichéd scenes later, Chellaiya fulfills his mission and redeems his family's reputation.

== Cast ==
- Prabhu as Chellaiya
- Roja as Meenakshi
- Alex as Masilamani
- Napoleon as Singaperumal
- Mumtaj as Vijaya
- Vadivelu as Rangasamy
- Kovai Sarala as Bhagyam
- Manivannan
- Ashwini
- Ravi Rahul
- Satya Prakash
- G. M. Sundar
- Chaplin Balu
- Sakthi

== Production ==
Shooting took place at locations including Ooty, Gobichettypalayam, and Pollachi. The art direction was done by Uma Shanker, dance choreography by Lalitha Mani and action choreography by Super Subbarayan. Meena had earlier refused to work in the film, feeling that the role of playing a mother onscreen would hurt further opportunities for her.

== Soundtrack ==
The soundtrack was composed by Aslam Mustafa, with lyrics written by Vairamuthu.

- "Jal Jal" – Shankar Mahadevan
- "Mittamirasu" – Mano
- "Adiye" – K. S. Chithra
- "Kichu Kichu" – Srinivas, Jaya
- "Vannakiliye" – Srinivas, Sujatha Mohan

== Reception ==
Malini Mannath wrote for Chennai Online: "It is the same old storyline, same old incidents, practically the same old stars and the same old performances. The director tries to whip up excitement towards the end with some violent, bloody action scenes, but then it is a bit too late". Visual Dasan of Kalki wrote the director does have screenplay knowledge and he should apply it in a new story next time. Cinesouth wrote "Director Mu.Kalanjiam is still treading on the age-old path. He has selected the oft-repeated theme of wreaking vengeance at a time when Tamil Cinema is slowly forgetting the principle of tit for tat. The first half of the film is a testing period for the patience of the audience. As it is, the film takes off only in its second half". Alex won the Tamil Nadu State Film Award for Best Villain and the Cinema Express Award for Best Villain.
