= Pollangu =

2012 Indian film by Gandhi Marx

- Directed by: Gandhi Marx
- Produced by: M. Prakash; E. Ravichandran
- Starring: Ravi Rahul; Nisha Lalwani
- Cinematography: Vinoth
- Edited by: Suresh Urs
- Production company: P. R. Entertainment
- Release date: 27 July 2012
- Country: India
- Language: Tamil

Pollangu (transl. Never tell a lie) is a 2012 Indian Tamil-language adventure thriller film directed by Gandhi Marx, starring Ravi Rahul and Nisha Lalwani. The film was released on 27 July 2012.

== Cast ==
- Ravi Rahul as Rahul
- Nisha Lalwani as Jhansi
- Vishwa
- Vetri
- Yatra
- Narayanan

== Production ==
This film marks the directorial debut of Gandhi Marx, who previously directed two short films and a documentary film. Although the film is an adventure thriller, the director decided to insert songs in the film for the commercial aspect. Hindi actress Nisha Lalwani, who previously starred in Kalyug (2005), was cast as a lead in this heroine-centric thriller and worked on this film at the same time as Sabki Bajegi Band (2015). Actor Ravi Rahul made a comeback in leading role after two decades. The film was shot in the deep forests of Chalakudy, Kodaikanal, and Talakona.

== Soundtrack ==
Pollangu

Soundtrack album by Jubin
- Released: 2012
- Genre: Feature film soundtrack
- Length: 25:16
- Language: Tamil
- Producer: Jubin

Jubin chronology
Vinmeengal (2012)	Pollangu (2012)	Pazhaya Vannarapettai (2016)

The music was composed by Jubin in his second film after Vinmeengal (2012).

Track listing
No.	Title	Lyrics	Singer(s)	Length
1.	"Maanattam"	Snehan	Rahul Nambiar, M. L. R. Karthikeyan, Malathi	4:56
2.	"Puli Varuthu - Clubmix"		M. L. R. Karthikeyan, Roshini	5:20
3.	"Onna Renda"		Priya Himesh	4:35
4.	"Kadhalay Un"	Yugabharathi	Naresh Iyer, Harini	5:15
5.	"Kadhalay Un (remix)"		Naresh Iyer, Harini	5:10
Total length:				25:16

== Release and reception ==
The film was released on 27 July 2012 alongside Maalai Pozhudhin Mayakathilaey and Suzhal. A critic from The Times of India opined that "The screenplay moves in such a way that nothing is revealed to the audience at necessary intervals, and it tests our patience". Malini Mannath of The New Indian Express wrote that "the director can be appreciated for going off the beaten path and from formula-plots. But a more coherent screenplay and a focused narration could have made the film a riveting thriller". A critic from Sify said that "It's not often one gets to see a jungle thriller and once in a way when one comes along, there are always expectations that hopefully it may showcase something different and offbeat. But Pollangu disappoints".
