= Saivam (soundtrack) =

Soundtrack album by G. V. Prakash Kumar
- Released: 28 May 2014
- Recorded: 2014
- Genre: Feature film soundtrack
- Length: 20:26
- Language: Tamil
- Label: Sony Music
- Producer: G. V. Prakash Kumar

G. V. Prakash Kumar chronology
Naan Sigappu Manithan (2014)	Saivam (2014)	Irumbu Kuthirai (2014)

Saivam is the soundtrack album to the 2014 film of the same name directed by A. L. Vijay starring Nassar and Sara Arjun. The film's musical score is composed by G. V. Prakash Kumar and the soundtrack featured five songs with lyrics written by Na. Muthukumar. The album was released through Sony Music India on 28 May 2014. The music received positive reviews, particularly the song "Azhagu". Uthara Unnikrishnan, who made her singing debut with the song, won the National Film Award for Best Female Playback Singer, becoming the youngest recipient of the award, and Na. Muthukumar also won the National Film Award for Best Lyrics for the song.

== Background ==
The soundtrack and score were composed by Vijay's norm collaborator G. V. Prakash Kumar, with lyrics for the songs being written by Na. Muthukumar. Prakash stated that he wanted to create an album like R. K. Narayan Malgudi Days and treated the music as the narrative of the short story. The music emphasized classical ragas and folk tunes. Singer P. Unnikrishnan's eight-year-old daughter Uthara recorded the song "Azhagu". Unnikrishnan was further present in the recording studio to guide her while singing. The song is composed in the Kanada raga. The album featured three songs and two instrumentals; one is a version of the "Azhagu", both instrumentals were performed by Navin Iyer.

== Release ==
The soundtrack was distributed by Sony Music India and released on 5 April 2014 in Chennai. An ambience of a village was created outside the venue, while all male guests were asked to wear a dhoti to the event. Each song from the film was introduced to the audience by different film personalities, before the album was launched.

== Track listing ==
No.	Title	Singer(s)	Length
1.	"Azhagu"	Uthara Unnikrishnan	5:41
2.	"Kokkara Kozhi"	Chinna Ponnu, Gaana Bala, Ashwitha, Harish, Aishwarya	3:09
3.	"Moments of Life" (Theme)	Navin Iyer	2:49
4.	"Ore Oru Ooril"	Haricharan	4:47
5.	"Azhagu" (Instrumental)	Navin Iyer	3:59
Total length:			20:26

== Reception ==
Karthik Srinivasan of Milliblog reviewed the album as "a short, sweet and sincere sounding album from GV Prakash Kumar, headlined by Uthara’s singing debut!" S. R. Ashok Kumar of The Hindu called "Azhagu" as the best song from the album.

S. Saraswathi of Rediff.com noted "G V Prakash's music is appropriate and pleasant, especially the Azhagu number, sung by singer Unnikrishnan’s eight-year-old daughter Uthara." Anupama Subramanian of Deccan Chronicle noted "GV Prakash’s rerecording warrants mention". Writing for Scroll.in, Anil Srinivasan noted on the use of Kanada raga in "Azhagu" which is "usually associated with a more languorous, detailed rendition, but here it is contextualized to fit a song sung by a child in the film" praising Prakash for his "tremendous variety in his oeuvre."

== Awards and nominations ==
Award (Note: Awards, festivals and organisations are in alphabetical order.)	Date of ceremony (Note: Date is linked to the article about the awards held that year, wherever possible.)	Category	Recipient(s)	Result	Ref.
Filmfare Awards South	26 June 2015	Best Lyricist – Tamil	Na. Muthukumar – ("Azhagu")	Won	
Filmfare Awards South	26 June 2015	Best Male Playback Singer – Tamil	Uthara Unnikrishnan – ("Azhagu")	Won	
Mirchi Music Awards South	23 July 2015	Best Music Director – Tamil	G. V. Prakash Kumar – ("Azhagu")	Nominated	
Mirchi Music Awards South	23 July 2015	Best Female Playback Singer – Tamil	Uthara Unnikrishnan – ("Azhagu")	Nominated	
Mirchi Music Awards South	23 July 2015	Best Lyricist – Tamil	Na. Muthukumar – ("Azhagu")	Won	
Mirchi Music Awards South	23 July 2015	Song of the Year – Tamil	"Azhagu"	Nominated	
Mirchi Music Awards South	23 July 2015	Upcoming Female Vocalist of the Year – Tamil	Uthara Unnikrishnan – ("Azhagu")	Won	
National Film Awards	24 March 2015	Best Lyrics	Na. Muthukumar – ("Azhagu")	Won	
National Film Awards	24 March 2015	Best Female Playback Singer	Uthara Unnikrishnan – ("Azhagu")	Won	
South Indian International Movie Awards	6–7 August 2015	Best Lyricist – Tamil	Na. Muthukumar – ("Azhagu")	Nominated	
South Indian International Movie Awards	6–7 August 2015	Best Female Playback Singer – Tamil	Uthara Unnikrishnan – ("Azhagu")	Won	
