= Maalai Pozhudhin Mayakathilaey =

2012 Indian film by Narayan Nagendra Rao

- Theatrical release poster
- Directed by: Narayan Nagendra Rao
- Written by: Narayan Nagendra Rao
- Produced by: C. H. Mayuri Shekar
- Starring: Aari Arujunan; Shubha Phutela
- Cinematography: Gopi Amarnath
- Edited by: M. Thiyagarajan
- Music by: Achu
- Production company: Sri Lakshmi Narasimha Creations
- Release date: 27 July 2012
- Country: India
- Language: Tamil

Maalai Pozhudhin Mayakathilaey (transl. Entranced by dusk) is a 2012 Indian Tamil-language independent romance film written and directed by Narayan Nagendra Rao in his debut. Produced by C. H. Mayuri Shekar of Sri Lakshmi Narasimha Creations, it stars Aari Arujunan and Shubha Phutela in her only acting credit, with Subbu Panchu, R. S. Shivaji, Balaji Venugopal, Tejasvini and Karunakaran in pivotal roles. Set in real time, it follows two strangers, played by Aari and Phutela, falling in love after meeting in a coffee shop. The music was composed by Achu, cinematography was handled by Gopi Amarnath and editing by M. Thiyagarajan. The film was released on 27 July 2012.

== Cast ==
Adapted from the closing credits:

- Aari Arujunan as Ajay
- Shubha Phutela as Jiya
- Subbu Panchu as the manager
- R. S. Shivaji as the writer
- Balaji Venugopal as Satish
- Tejasvini as Ramya
- Sathish as Tarun
- Karunakaran as Sampath
- S. N. Gunasekar as Mamaji
- Master Vishnu as Vishnu
- Srini as Kamal
- Hari Hara Krishnan as Hari
- Radha Manallan as Paarthi
- Nandha (guest appearance in the song "Oh Baby Girl")
- Ashwathy Warrier (guest appearance in "Oh Baby Girl")
- Karthi (guest appearance in "Oh Baby Girl")

== Production ==
Maalai Pozhudhin Mayakathilaey is the directorial debut of Narayan Nagendra Rao. He revealed that the idea for the film occurred to him on a rainy day during his visit to a coffee shop when he was "down and out". According to him, "The run time and the psychological time of the story is the same" in the film. C. H. Mayuri Shekar of Sri Lakshmi Narasimha Creations agreed to produce the film after Nagendra Rao not only narrated the script but made her listen to the songs. Cinematography was handled by Gopi Amarnath, editing by M. Thiyagarajan and art direction by J. P. K. Prem.

Shubha Phutela was cast as the lead actress. A non-native Tamil speaker, she had to learn the language, and it took her over two months of practice to get the pronunciation right. The director wanted to opt for live-sound recording, making it more difficult for Phutela. She had to opt out of a Kannada film Jai Bajarangabali, choosing to give her priority dates to completing Maalai Pozhudhin Mayakathilaey. Phutela died in October 2012, making Maalai Pozhudhin Mayakathilaey the only film she ever acted in. Aari Arujunan, the lead actor, mentioned that it was "really challenging to play an ordinary guy" as he had to consciously keep his emotions to a minimum at all times. Tejasvini was cast after the makers saw her as an anchor at Sun TV.

== Soundtrack ==
The soundtrack album features nine songs composed by Achu. The album was released on 14 February 2012. The song "Oh Baby Girl" attained popularity.

Track listing
No.	Title	Lyrics	Singer(s)	Length
1.	"Oh Baby Girl"	Achu, Narayan Nagendra Rao	Hemachandra, Achu	3:46
2.	"Yaaro Ivalo"	Rohini	Haricharan	3:29
3.	"Yen Uyirey"	Rohini	Karthik	4:37
4.	"Yaen Indha Dhideer Thirupam"	Achu, Narayan Nagendra Rao	Achu	4:31
5.	"Nerathin Neram Yellam"	Narayan Nagendra Rao	Narayan Nagendra Rao, Chinmayi, Achu	1:40
6.	"Yen Uyirey" (reprise)	Rohini	K. S. Chithra	4:23
7.	"Kadal Karayiley"	Achu	Sriram Parthasarathy	2:46
8.	"MPM Anthem"	Achu	Achu	2:35
9.	"Yen Uyirey" (unplugged)	Rohini	Bombay Jayashri	3:57
Total length:				31:44

== Release ==
The first press meet for Maalai Pozhudhin Mayakathilaey was held on 15 February 2012, with Ameer as chief guest. The film was released on 27 July 2012, alongside Suzhal, Pollangu, and Pechiyakka Marumagan. Despite all four films being low budgeted, the media noted that Maalai Pozhudhin Mayakathilaey generated considerable hype mainly due to the popularity of its music.

== Reception ==
A reviewer from Sify wrote that Maalai Pozhudhin Mayakathilaey was "back breakingly long and turns out to be a boring affair", continuing to quote that the director had "tried out an experimental film which is preachy, monotonous and moves at snail pace". The Times of India critic M. Suganth called it a "largely uninteresting — and also a little pretentious — film that fails in execution, the chief culprit being the pacing". Karthik Subramanian from The Hindu appreciated Gopi Amarnath's cinematography and some of the cast performances, but criticised all the other aspects, concluding, "Painfully boring script makes the running time of close to two hours feel like an entire day at the cinema". Malini Mannath of The New Indian Express wrote, "Experimental in its narrative style, the film is targeted at an elite urban audience. But at times, it turns a tad monotonous and bland".
