= Nanda Nanditha (2012 film) =

2012 Indian film by Ramshiva

- Directed by: Ramshiva
- Written by: Ramshiva (dialogues)
- Screenplay by: Ramshiva
- Story by: Ajaykumar
- Produced by: M. Govindaraj; M. Nagaraj; G. Bhoopal
- Starring: Hemachandran; Surya Pratap; Meghana Raj
- Music by: Emil Mohammed
- Production company: Franch Pictures
- Release date: 24 March 2012
- Running time: 125 minutes
- Country: India
- Languages: Tamil; Telugu

Nanda Nandhita is a 2012 Indian romantic drama film directed by Ramshiva. The film was made simultaneously in Tamil and Telugu with Hemachandran, Surya Pratap, and Meghana Raj. The film is a remake of the 2008 Kannada film of the same name. In the Tamil version, Hemachandran portrays the protagonist and Surya Pratap portrays a supporting role. In the Telugu version, the roles are reversed.

== Cast ==
Actor (Tamil)	Actor (Telugu)	Role (Tamil)	Role (Telugu)
Hemachandran	Surya Pratap	Nanda	Nanda
Meghana Raj		Nandhita	Nandhita
Surya Pratap	Hemachandran	Kumar	Kumar
Nassar		Thug	Thug
Shanmugarajan		Politician	Politician
Muthukaalai		Cattle owner	Cattle owner
Sudha		Nandhita's mother	Nandhita's mother
Jyothi Rana		Special appearance in the song "Iyya Rasa" / "Athanesoodu"	Special appearance in the song "Iyya Rasa" / "Athanesoodu"
Robert		Special appearance in the song "Salam Namasthey"	Special appearance in the song "Salam Namasthey"

== Soundtrack ==
The songs were composed by Emil Mohammed, who also composed for the original. The song "Jinke Marina" from the original was reused as "Jinke Marina"/"Jinkamaleena".

Tamil version

The lyrics were written by Vaali, Kabilan, Snehan, Viveka, and Jayantha.

Song(s)	Singer(s)
"En Idhyam"	Javed Ali, Sangeetha
"Iyya Rasa"	Naveen, Suchitra
"Jimke Marina" (lyrics by Vaali)	Emil Mohammed, Karthik, Harish Raghavendra, Tippu, Srinivas
"Jimke Marina" (remix)	Emil Mohammed, Karthik, Ranjith, Maqbool, Ramshiva
"Salam Namasthey"	Tippu, Krishna Iyer

Telugu version

- "Naa Hrudayam" - Yazin Nizar
- "Jinkamaleena"
- "Athanesoodu"
- "Salam Namasthe"
- "Jinkamaleena" (remix)

== Reception ==
A critic from Sify wrote: "With crass item number, songs which come as speed breakers, subplots, flashback within flashbacks, jarring background score, and lot of violence, this mass film fails to impress". A critic from The New Indian Express wrote that " It’s surprising that a Kannada flick which created no great ripples at the box office, and had a routine scenario so familiar to Tamil audiences, should be chosen to be remade in Tamil". A reviewer from The Times of India gave the film a rating of one out of five stars and noted that "The film manages the astonishing feat of falling even below expectations". Reviewing the Telugu version, a critic from The Times of India gave the film a rating of one out of five stars and stated: "There are some movies which are so bad you can at least crack up about how bad they are. Nanda Nandita isn’t one of them".
