= Shubha Phutela =

Indian model and actress

- Shubha Phutela in Maalai Pozhudhin Mayakathilaey
- Born: 5 May 1991; Ludhiana, Punjab, India
- Died: 22 October 2012 (aged 21); Bangalore, Karnataka, India
- Occupations: Actress, model
- Years active: 2011–2012

Shubha Phutela (5 May 1991 – 22 October 2012) was an Indian model and actress. She was crowned Hair-o-max Miss South India 2010. She starred in the Tamil film Maalai Pozhudhin Mayakathilaey that was released in 2012.

== Early life and family ==
Shubha was born in Ludhiana, Punjab to Rajpal and Santosh Phutela. Her father is scientist/professor in microbiology. Her mother is a retired teacher. She has an elder sister and a younger brother. Her elder sister is married to an IT professional and is settled in the US. Her younger brother is doing his bachelor's degree in engineering.

As a child, Phutela was very sheltered and studious. In her own words,

My aim of life then was to study, come home, watch TV. Watching TV was one of the things that I always rejoiced, watching all the saas-bahu serials with my mom and rounding off the day with some teen shows.

After school, Phutela joined Dayananda Sagar College, Bangalore to do her graduation in BE Computer Science.

== Modeling career ==
Modelling happened by chance. While shopping at the mall, Phutela heard about a small pageant happening there. Her friends compelled her to join the contest and as fate would have it, she won. From there on, she went on to win other pageants like Miss Cosmos 2007, Miss Youth 2008, Sigma Mall Brand Model Hunt 2008 and finally the big one, Hair-o-max Miss South India 2010.

Phutela has been the face of some of the top brands like Fastrack, Honda City, TVS Scooty, Kingfisher, Britannia, Fly Mobile etc. She has done print ads for various textiles and jewellery brands like Nalli Silks, Rasi Silks, Kalyan Jewellers (Coimbatore), Kannika Parmeshwari Silks etc. She was on the cover page of March 2011 Femina's BUYOLOGY, Bangalore Supplement. Shubha has walked the ramp for designers including Raj Shroff, Michele Salins, Ramesh Dembla, Anu Nagappa etc.

== Acting career ==
Phutela debuted as an actress in the Tamil-language film Maalai Pozhudhin Mayakathilaey, released in July 2012. In the film, she played the role of a Muslim girl, Jiya Jaffer. She spent two months learning Tamil for this film. She opted out of the Kannada film Jai Bajarangabali as the producers of her debut film required exclusive dates.

== Death ==
Phutela died on 22 October 2012 at the Apollo Hospital in Bangalore, at age 21. According to a report by The Times of India, she was suffering from a kidney ailment which was a result of jaundice which she chose only to reveal to a small number of people. She was in a state of coma for the last few days.

== Filmography ==
Year	Film	Role	Language
2012	Maalai Pozhudhin Mayakathilaey	Jiya Jaffer	Tamil
