= Star 67 =

2012 Canadian film by Triden V Balasingam and Kathi Selvakumar

- Directed by: Triden V. Balasingam; Kathi Selvakumar
- Screenplay by: Triden V. Balasingam; Kathi Selvakumar
- Starring: Imman Kannan; Yasotha; Hamaltan Christy; Malarvilly Varatharaja
- Cinematography: Kuhenthiran
- Edited by: Triden V. Balasingam
- Music by: Senthuran Alagaiya
- Production company: Wotar Sound Pictures
- Release date: 30 March 2012
- Country: Canada
- Language: Tamil

Star 67 is a 2012 crime thriller directed by Triden V Balasingam & Kathi Selvakumar, featuring Imman Kannan in the lead role. The soundtrack of the film was composed by Senthuran Alagaiya, while cinematography and editing were handled by Kuhenthiran and Triden V. Balasingam, respectively. It was produced by Wotar Sound Pictures. It had a decent run at select cinemas and tasted success at the box office.

== Cast ==
- Imman Kannan
- Yasotha. M
- Hamalton Christy
- Kurungan Manimaran
- Seeyon Alfons
- Raj Rasiah
- Ganapathy Raveendran
- Satha Panahai Ramesh
- Jenisa
- Malarvilly Varatharaja
- Kanthasamy Gangatharan
- Rick Gomes
- David Kinsman
- Megs Mulkins
- Milton
- Clemento Carrillo
- Leslie K.
- Sean Liu
- Ken Kiruba
- Caitlin Alexander
- Murali

== Soundtrack ==
Star 67

Soundtrack album Star 67 by Senthuran Alagaiya
- Released: Not released for sale
- Recorded: 2011–2012
- Genre: Feature film soundtrack
- Language: Tamil
- Label: Wotar Sound Pictures

The soundtrack was composed by Senthuran Alagaiya.

All lyrics are written by Triden V. Balasingam.

Track listing
No.	Title	Singer(s)	Length
1.	"Eraththam Seiyum Yutham (Theme)"	Subahsini	11:37
2.	"Eraththam Seiyum Yutham (Score)"	Valla & Subahsini	10:59
3.	"Kangal"	Valla	02:45
4.	"Katpai"	Mogana	01:39
5.	"Mutrum"	Mogana	01:38
6.	"Nilavin Oliyil"	Kilgin Bernold Prabu	02:15
7.	"Vaanam"	Jegan Nath	03:35
Total length:			34:32
