= Radhika (Malayalam actress) =

Indian actress

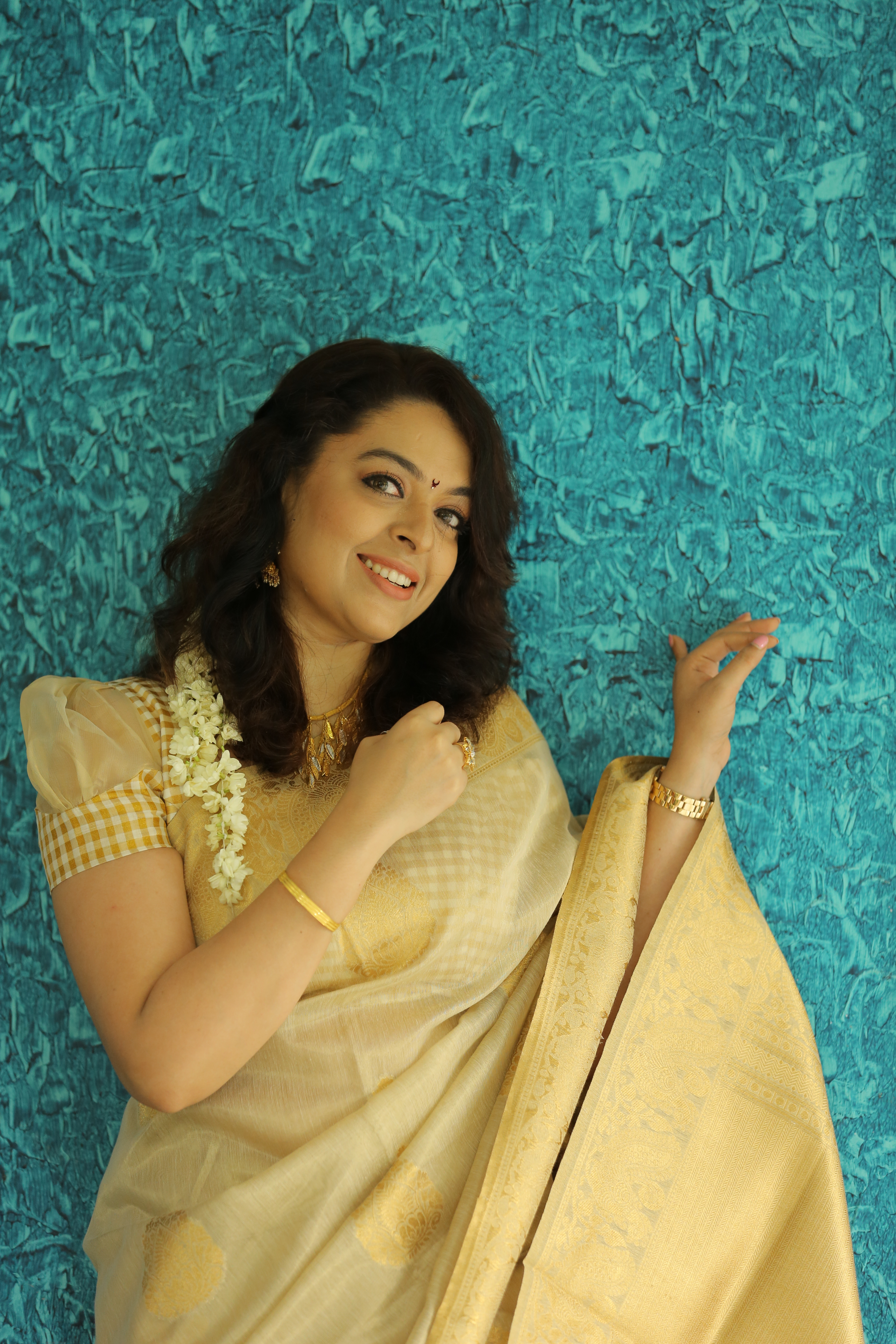
- Radhika in 2022
- Born: Cherthala, Kerala, India
- Years active: 1992; 2000–2013, 2019, 2023
- Spouse: Abhil Krishna (m. 2016)

Radhika is an Indian actress who appears mainly in Malayalam films.

== Career ==
She became popular by the character Razia in director Lal Jose's blockbuster movie Classmates.

== Personal life ==
Radhika got engaged to Dubai-based Abhil Krishna on 27 December 2016, and they were married on 12 February 2017.

== Filmography ==
Year	Title	Role	Notes
1992	Vietnam Colony	Krishnamoorthy's niece	Child artist
2000	Life Is Beautiful	Audience	
2000	Darling Darling	Lathika	
2000	Kannukkul Nilavu	Hema's friend	Tamil film
2001	Sharja To Sharja	Ammu Kutty	
2001	One Man Show	Aswathi	
2003	War and Love	Rukhiya	
2005	Daivanamathil	Najma	
2005	Thaskara Veeran	Sethulakshmi	
2006	Achanurangatha Veedu	Hari's fiancée	
2006	Classmates	Razia	
2006	Panthalayinilekkoru Yatra		Telefilm
2007	Changathipoocha	Sridevi	
2007	Mission 90 Days	Nalini	
2007	Nasrani	Archana Shankar	
2008	One Way Ticket	Sajira	
2008	Minnaminnikoottam	Kalyani	
2008	Twenty:20	Radhika	
2009	Daddy Cool	Millie	
2010	In Ghost House Inn	Marathakam/& her twin sister	
2010	Best Of Luck	Herself	Guest appearance
2011	Kudumbasree Travels	Sreedevi / Hemalatha	
2011	Kadhayile Nayika	Maya	
2012	Udumban	Isaipriya	Tamil film Credited as Sana
2012	Cobra	Rosy (Raja's fiancée)	
2012	Mayamohini	Swathi	Guest Appearance
2013	Annum Innum Ennum	Anjana aka Anju	
2013	Pakaram	Sakshi	
2019	Oolu	Meenakshi	
2023	Ayisha	Nisha	Malayalam - Arabic bilingual film
