= Bhavani (2011 film) =

- Poster
- Directed by: G. Kitcha
- Screenplay by: G. Kitcha
- Based on: Karthavyam
- Produced by: G. Kitcha
- Starring: Sneha
- Cinematography: K. Boopathy
- Music by: Dhina
- Production company: K Films International
- Distributed by: Shri Movie Makers
- Release date: 11 March 2011
- Country: India
- Language: Tamil

Bhavani is a 2011 Indian Tamil-language crime action film writte, produced, and directed by G. Kitcha, starring Sneha in the title role as the police officer. The film also stars Vivek, Sampath Raj, Kota Srinivasa Rao, Aryan and Yasmin Khan. It is a remake of the Telugu film Karthavyam (1990). The film was released on 11 March 2011.

== Plot ==
Bhavani (Sneha), an honest police officer in Hyderabad, is posted as Assistant Commissioner of Police in Tirunelveli upon the request of the Tamil Nadu government. The town is controlled by Sivalingam (Kota Srinivasa Rao), a baddie and aspiring politician who indulges in all unlawful activities. Bhavani resolves to put an end to all his acts. Meanwhile, Surya (Sampath Raj) voices against Sivalingam. As it happens, Sivalingam's son Ranjith (Aryan) plays spoilsport in the life of Bhavani's sister Deepa (Yasmin Khan). Efforts to prove him guilty by Bhavani end in vain. Now, a conspiracy is hatched by Bhavani in the company of Surya, and Ranjith is killed. An enraged Sivalingam takes Bhavani head-on. Sivalingam vows vengeance, and what happens from there forms the rest of the story.

== Cast ==
- Sneha as ACP A. Bhavani, an IPS officer
- Vivek as Ghirivalam
- Sampath Raj as Surya
- Kota Srinivasa Rao as Sivalingam
- Aryan as Ranjith
- Yasmin Khan as Deepa
- Vanitha Krishnachandran as Deepa's mother
- Delhi Ganesh as Bhavani's father
- Raj Kapoor as Lawyer
- Paravai Muniyamma (special appearance in the song "Karuppusamy Kaakisatta")
- Ponnambalam
- Manobala as Ramakrishnan
- Ilavarasu as Shanmugam
- Cell Murugan as Motorcycle driver
- Siva Narayana Murthy as Traffic Inspector
- Boys Rajan
- Kili Ramachandran as Motorcycle driver

== Production ==
The film, being in the action genre, was a departure for Sneha who was then known mainly for her girl next door roles.

== Soundtrack ==
The music was composed by Dhina, with lyrics by Yugabharathi.

| Song | Singers |
|---|---|
| "Aadupuli Aattamthan" | Dhina |
| "Karpoora Kannazhagi" | G. Kicha, Anuradha Sriram, Dhina |
| "Karuppusamy Kaakisatta" | Paravai Muniyamma |
| "Malai Sainthal" | Manikka Vinayagam |
| "Mullai Malar" | Rita Thyagarajan, Dhanapal |

== Release and reception ==
Bhavani was released on 11 March 2011 after a week from the scheduled release date of 4 March due to financial problems. A critic from The New Indian Express wrote that "Sneha may not have touched the energy level that her senior had infused into the role, but there’s no denying that she has put in great effort, particularly in the stunt-chase scenes". Sify wrote, "Acting wise, everybody hams and shouts. There are hardly any positive things to say about Sneha’s first cop movie". The film was released with 160 prints in Tamil Nadu and in 12 screens in Mumbai, highest for a non-hero film.
