= Udumban =

2012 Indian film by Ramji S. Balan

- Poster
- Directed by: Ramji S. Balan
- Written by: Ramji S. Balan
- Produced by: S. Jaganathan
- Starring: Dilip Rogger; Sana; Geethika; G. Sunil
- Cinematography: Kichas
- Edited by: M. Sunil Kumar; Editing Supervisor: V. T. Vijayan
- Music by: Ramji S. Balan
- Production company: Modern Cinemas
- Release date: 17 February 2012
- Country: India
- Language: Tamil

Udumban (transl. Monitor lizard man) is a 2012 Indian Tamil-language action drama film written and directed by Ramji S. Balan and starring Dilip Rogger, Sana, Geethika, and G. Sunil.

== Cast ==
- Dilip Rogger as Udumban
- Sana as Isaipriya, a PhD student researching education
- Geethika as a saree thief, who is engaged to Udumban
- G. Sunil as Kaalai, Udumban's elder brother who is allergic to lizard meat
- Senthil as Maari, Udumban's friend
- Chellakuri as Inspector Courtallam
- Kambam Meena as Udumban's mother
- Paravai Muniyamma (special appearance in the song "Ange Idi Muzhangathu")

== Production ==
Bike racer Dilip Rogger debuted as an actor with this film and trained for six months for the role. Rogger's character was based on Paruthi Vooran from Paruthi-Oor (previously depicted in Paruthiveeran), who actually existed according to the director. The film was shot in the same locations where Paruthi Vooran allegedly lived. A monitor lizard (udumbu in Tamil) plays a prominent role in the film. Malayalam actress Radhika was cast opposite Rogger in the role of a researcher and Kerala model Nachathra as the second heroine, and they were rechristened as Sana and Geethika, respectively. The film was shot in the interior villages of Madurai and Karaikudi, and was shot for three years because when it rained the land would get wet and not look authentic.

== Soundtrack ==
The soundtrack was composed by Ramji S. Balan. It features five songs that were written by Bharathidasan and two written by Pattukottai Kalyanasundaram, and includes "Ange Idi Muzhangathu", a famous folk song dedicated to Karuppasamy.

- "Ange Idi Muzhangathu" – Thekkampatti Sundarrajan and Paravai Muniyamma
- "Kaattrilellam" – Hariharan and Sadhana Sargam
- "Pallikoodam Muthal Mani" – Anuradha Sriram and Hariharan
- "Vaanukku Nilavu" – Shankar Mahadevan
- "Kandavudan Kaathal" – Hariharan
- "Paazhaai Pona Manam" – Shankar Mahadevan and Priya
- "Nallarukkum Pollarukkum" – Mukesh
- "Oram Kizhinjalum" – Mukesh

== Release ==
The film was scheduled to release on 10 February, but faced troubles as wildlife enthusiast P. Selvaraj sought to ban the film for violence against monitor lizards, an endangered species. Rogger claimed that the monitor lizard was only present during the first photoshoot and appeared in the film through the use of graphics. Although a court hearing was scheduled on 16 February, the film released on 17 February. Producer Jeganathan claimed to have obtained permission from forest officials before shooting with the monitor lizard. He filed a ₹1 crore defamation suit against Selvaraj.

== Reception ==
Malathi Rangarajan of The Hindu opined that "But isn't neat execution even more important [than a strong storyline] to make the film worth your while? It is in this area that Udumban falls terribly short". Siddharth Varma of The Times of India stated that "The storyline is a little confusing as it tries to incorporate too many things – sibling rivalry, the rich becoming richer, police corruption, the plight of farmers and, yes, the education system too. Ultimately, it falls victim to the many flaws it wants to highlight". A critic from The New Indian Express wrote that "But what is consistent and holds up the film to a large extent, is the line of humour and satire that runs throughout. Udumban delivers much more that what one expected". A critic from Sify said that "On the whole, the film is well-intentioned, humourous [sic] and criticizes the flaws of our education system and how anybody can start a school with prime focus on minting money in an entertaining manner. It addresses the topical issue about the challenge that parents go through to get their kids admitted to private schools". A critic from Dinamalar praised several aspects of the film including the performance of the cast, the music, the lyrics, the cinematography, the editing, but criticised the storyline of the second half of the film.
