= Ravi Rahul =

Indian actor

- Occupations: Actor, director
- Years active: 1991–present

Ravi Rahul is an Indian actor and director, who has appeared in leading roles in films and television.

== Career ==
Ravi Rahul was introduced as a leading actor in Kasthuri Raja's Aatha Un Koyilile (1991), before moving on to appear in further lead roles in Maangalyam Thandhunaane (1991) and Tamizh Ponnu (1992). As offers in Tamil films began to reduce, Ravi Rahul moved on to work on Tamil television serials, appearing in over 50 shows. Following an extended period away from the film industry, he made a comeback in the lead role through Pollangu (2012). The film opened to negative reviews with Ravi Rahul being criticised for his performance.

Ravi Rahul made his directorial debut through Salaam (2017). In 2018, he directed a film titled Kalavani Sirukki featuring newcomers.

== Filmography ==
=== Actor ===
Films

Year	Film	Role	Notes
1991	Aatha Un Koyilile	Pandi	
1991	Maangalyam Thandhunaane	Ilango	
1992	Tamizh Ponnu	Sundarapandi	
1993	Madhumathi		
2001	Mitta Miraasu		
2012	Pollangu	Rahul	
2014	Nalanum Nandhiniyum		
2017	Salaam		

Television

Year	Serial	Role	Channel	Notes
2001	Guhan		Raj TV	
2012	Nadaswaram		Sun TV	
2024–present	Gauri		Kalaignar TV	

=== Director ===
- Salaam (2017)
- Kalavani Sirukki (2018)
