= Kai (film) =

- Promotional poster
- Directed by: Vinod Raghavaa
- Written by: Vinod Raghavaa
- Dialogue by: S. Anand
- Produced by: Kovur Ravi
- Starring: Vijjith Shivashanmugam; Joshna Fernando; Charan Raj; Bose Venkat
- Cinematography: Sajath Menon; Raghava Raju
- Edited by: R. S. Selvin
- Music by: Ishaan Dev
- Production company: Kumudha Movies
- Release date: 23 November 2012
- Country: India
- Language: Tamil

Kai is a 2012 Indian Tamil-language romantic action drama film co-written and directed by Vinod Raghavaa and starring newcomer Vijith, Joshna Fernando and Charan Raj while Bose Venkat plays the titular role. The film was released to negative reviews and was a box office failure.

== Plot ==
Kailash "Kai" and Siva are brothers. Kai is the right-hand of don Guruji. Siva falls in love with Priya, the sister of ACP Durai, who despises both Kai and Guruji.

== Cast ==
- Vijjith Shivashanmugam as Siva
- Joshna Fernando as Priya
- Charan Raj as ACP Durai
- Bose Venkat as Kailash a.k.a. Kai
- Ganja Karuppu as Puyal Perumal
- Kadhal Dhandapani as Gaaji
- Vadivukkarasi as Siva and Kailash's foster mother
- Sampath Ram as Sampath
- Shakeela as Student
- Soori as Siva's friend
- Sumathi G. as Selvi
- Yogi Babu as Puyal Perumal's friend
- Vengal Rao as Korangu Gopal

== Soundtrack ==
The music was composed by Ishaan Dev in his Tamil debut and the lyrics were written by Snehan and Pulamaipithan.

Track listing
No.	Title	Singer(s)	Length
1.	"Kanne Kanne Aarariro"	K. J. Yesudas	4:05
2.	"Ayyave"	Shweta Mohan, Ishaan Dev	4:25
3.	"Meesariye"	Rita Thyagarajan, Rakesh Bhramanandan	4:35
4.	"Kai - Theme Song"	Haricharan	2:49
5.	"Annakiliye"	Anitha Shaiq, Jassie Gift	3:38
Total length:			19:32

== Reception ==
A critic from Dinamalar wrote that the confusions faced by debutant director Vinod Raghav are visible throughout the film. Every scene clearly shows that the director listened to all the talk about how the film won't work out and still took the film without believing in his story.
