= Eppadi Manasukkul Vanthai =

2012 Indian film by P. V. Prasath

- Directed by: P. V. Prasath
- Written by: P. V. Prasath, Vijay Milton (dialogues)
- Produced by: G. Kitcha
- Starring: Vishva; Tanvi Vyas
- Cinematography: Vijay Milton
- Edited by: V. T. Vijayan
- Music by: A. J. Daniel
- Production companies: MK Enterprise; Shri Movie Makers
- Release date: 10 August 2012
- Running time: 155 minutes
- Country: India
- Language: Tamil

Eppadi Manasukkul Vanthai (transl. How did you come inside my heart?) is a 2012 Tamil language romantic thriller film directed by P. V. Prasath, starring Vishva and Tanvi Vyas. The film released on 10 August 2012 with mixed reviews.

== Cast ==
- Vishva as Seenu
- Tanvi Vyas as Mithra
- Irfan as Sam
- Ravi Kale as a police inspector
- Mahendran
- Satish
- Debi Dutta in a special appearance

== Soundtrack ==
Soundtrack was composed by A. J. Daniel. All lyrics were written by PV Prasath.

- "Oru Paarvayile" – Harish Raghavendra
- "En Kadhal" – Karthik
- "En Thottathu" – Priya Himesh, Benny Dayal
- "Oorakali" – Gana Ulaganathan
- "Malaipola" – Priya Himesh

== Critical reception ==
In the review of the film for The New Indian Express, Malini Mannath wrote: "With a taut screenplay and well fleshed out characters, director Prasad (of Kadhalil Vizhundhen) has managed to keep his narrative engaging and fast paced. He has co-ordinated the work of his technical crew ably. It's an impressive cast of actors who lend credibility and conviction to their characters." A critic from Nowrunning wrote "Eppadi Manasukkul Vandhai has an average masala story that is given superior treatment by an above-average Kollywood director. It then becomes a gripping crime thriller that is steered into the masala format, from time to time, for purposes of accessibility." The reviewer also noted similarities between the film and The Talented Mr. Ripley (1999). A critic from Sify wrote "The films packaging is what catches our eye with great camera work, rich locations and hummable tunes but sadly lacks a cohesive script and drags big time especially the long drawn out climax." A critic from Behindwoods wrote "Eppadi Manasukkul Vandhai has traces of Kadhalil Vizhundhen but it's not the same love story. It has its heart in its place and the fact that Prasad has peppered it with enough plot twists and turns makes it worth a watch. It's an engagingly shot, albeit not brilliantly performed, movie that might provide good time pass." A critic from The Hindu wrote "EMV doesn't hold the viewer's attention completely, mainly because Prasath has allowed ample space for avoidable elements."
