= Krishnaveni Panjaalai =

2012 Indian film by Dhanapal Padmanabhan

- Theatrical release poster
- Directed by: Dhanapal Padmanabhan
- Written by: Dhanapal Padmanabhan
- Starring: Hemachandran; Nandana; M. S. Bhaskar; Rajiv Krishna
- Cinematography: Suresh Bhargav; Adhisayaraj
- Edited by: Mu. Kasiviswanathan
- Music by: N. R. Raghunanthan
- Production company: Minveli Media Works
- Release date: 8 June 2012
- Country: India
- Language: Tamil

Krishnaveni Panjaalai is a 2012 Indian Tamil-language historical romance film written and directed by debutant Dhanapal Padmanabhan. The film has Hemachandran, Nandana, M. S. Bhaskar, Rajiv Krishna and Bala Singh among others in lead roles. It is set in the backdrop of the 1980s and is about the lives of workers in a cotton mill. Music is by N. R. Raghunanthan of Thenmerku Paruvakaatru fame. The film was released on 8 June 2012.

== Plot ==
Kadir and Poonkothai are cotton mill workers in Udumalaipettai, Tamil Nadu. Their affection grows into love but once the mill closes down following a strike, life gets hard for them and everyone working along with them.

== Cast ==
- Hemachandran as Kathir
- Nandana as Poonkothai
- M. S. Bhaskar
- Rajiv Krishna as Krishnamoorthy
- Bala Singh
- Thennavan
- Shanmugarajan

== Soundtrack ==
The music was composed by N. R. Raghunanthan.

Song	Lyrics	Singer(s)
"Aalaikari"	Vairamuthu	Vijay Prakash
"Aathaadi"	Chithran	Harish Raghavendra, Sithara
"Rojamalaiye"	Vairamuthu	Jassie Gift
"Un Kankal"	Thamarai	Raman Mahadevan, Shreya Ghoshal, Ranina Reddy
"Un Kankal" II	Thamarai	Raman Mahadevan, Shreya Ghoshal, Ranina Reddy

== Reception ==
The Times of India gave the film a rating of three-and-a-half out of five stars and stated that "Krishnaveni Panjaalai works in parts and could have been more engaging had its screenplay been more tightly knit." A critic from The Hindu wrote that "It is in the screenplay that Dhanapal falters. Scenes end abruptly and stand as separate strands without cohesion". India Today noted that "The climax of the film is very emotional and touches a chord. However, the screenplay could have been better". Sify wrote, "Suesh Bhargav's camera is good. Shanmuga Raja who normally plays villain is a treat to watch as mill supervisor who tries to impress girls with a 5-star chocolate and is madly in love with Poonkothai. On the whole, Krishnaveni Panjaalai is an average watch".
