= Dilip Rogger =

Indian superbike racer

Dilip Rogger is an Indian superbike racer. He is the first Asian to compete in the German National Championship Endurance Race. In 2009 he qualified as one among 18 racers, selected from a lot of 62 riders, Race - 42. He rode the KTM RC 8 R 1190 cc version of the LC8 bike. He is also a hardware, software and multimedia professional.

== Early life ==
Rogger was born on 26 October. He completed his bachelor's degree in Computer Science at Binary College (affiliated with Sunderland University) in Malaysia.

Rogger’s interest in bike racing started at age 13, when he rode a Yamaha RX 135, at Sriperumbudur racing track, Chennai. At 16 he raced at the Silverstone Circuit and Daytona Park, London, where he passed the qualifying test.

== Career ==
Rogger’s break came at 18, when he participated in the Pirelli Supersports Novice Category of the Malaysian Super Series 2004 (Grand Prix). The championship consisted of 7 rounds and 14 races. He made it to the podium for all the races and finished first in 5 races, second in 8 races and third in 1 race. he rode a Honda CBR600 F4i bike. He won the Championship Title with a total tally of 97 points.

Rogger rode a race-spec Yamaha R6 (2005) in the Malaysian Super Series Championship (Open Class) Superbike Category (14 races) in 2005, placing second twice, third twice, fifth twice, and seventh once. He also participated in the FIM Asian Road Racing Championship (Round One) in China at the Zuhai Circuit and placed sixth. Rogger was the only private rider to place in the entire championship.

Rogger came back in 2009 Open Class Supersports Category, winning fifth place twice and sixth place twice, competing with five Asian FIM GP riders from PETRONAS Racing, Malaysia and the Yamaha Hong Leong Malaysia (Factory teams) as a privateer.

Rogger acted in films such as Udumban (2012) and Viraivil Isai (2015).

== Filmography ==
Year	Film	Role	Notes
2012	Udumban	Udumban	
2015	Viraivil Isai	Ram	

== Awards ==
- ROLON National Road Racing Championship 2009
- Winner of Race 1 & Race 2 of UCAL Rolon National road racing championship Super Bikes held at Kari Motor Speedway in Chettipalayam, Coimbatore, India 7–8 June 2008.
- Winner of Race 1 and Race 2 of JK Tyre National Racing Championship Super Bikes held at Sriperambatur, Chennai, India 9–10 February 2008.
- Award for Best Privateer Maintenance Team for year 2007 FIM Asian GP championship.
- First Privateer standing in 11th position for the year 2007 FIM Asian GP championship.
