= Marupadiyum Oru Kadhal =

2012 Indian film by Vasu Baskar

- Theatrical release poster
- Directed by: Vasu Baskar
- Written by: Vasu Baskar
- Produced by: Simamegalai
- Starring: Saiju Kurup; Joshna Fernando; Suman; Vadivelu
- Cinematography: D. Kannan
- Edited by: Raja Mohammed
- Music by: Srikanth Deva
- Production company: Connect Film Media
- Release date: 15 June 2012
- Running time: 140 minutes
- Country: India
- Language: Tamil

Marupadiyum Oru Kadhal (transl. Love once again) is a 2012 Indian Tamil-language romance film written and directed by Vasu Baskar, starring Saiju Kurup (credited as Anirudh), Joshna Fernando, Suman and Vadivelu. It was released on 15 June 2012 and received negative reviews.

== Cast ==
- Saiju Kurup as Jeeva
- Joshna Fernando as Mahi
- Suman as Mahi's father
- Vadivelu as Dr. Singaram, MBBS
- Y. Gee. Mahendra as Jeeva's father
- Ponvannan
- Vani Kishore
- Sriranjani as Jeeva's mother
- Bharani
- Thyagu
- Boys Rajan
- Vengal Rao as Stomach pain patient
- Pandu
- Thalapathi Dinesh
- Suruli Manohar
- Sanjana Singh (Item number)

== Soundtrack ==
Marupadiyum Oru Kadhal

Soundtrack album by Srikanth Deva
- Released: Sep 6, 2010
- Recorded: 2010
- Genre: Soundtrack
- Length: 55:14
- Label: Saga Music
- Producer: Srikanth Deva

Srikanth Deva chronology
Aathi Narayana (2012)	Marupadiyum Oru Kadhal (2010)	Murattu Kaalai (2012)

The music was composed by Srikanth Deva and released by Saga Music.

Track list
No.	Title	Lyrics	Singer(s)	Length
1.	"May Maadham"	Na. Muthukumar	Benny Dayal	4:18
2.	"Kannanai Thedi"	Vaali	Shreya Ghoshal	4:32
3.	"Ullam Kollai Ponen"	Vasu Kokila	Shankar Mahadevan, Haricharan	4:11
4.	"Kadhala Kadhala"	Vaali	Shravya	4:30
5.	"Kalloori Kaatrae"	Vaali	Karthik	4:46
6.	"Kadhala Kadhala (Bit)"	Vaali	Shravya	2:38
7.	"Salakku Salakku"	Kabilan	Udit Narayan, Vijay Yesudas	4:35
8.	"Marupdaiyum Oru Kadhaal"	Vasu Baskar	Shravya	2:22
9.	"Marupadiyum Oru Kadhal (Theme) 2"		Instrumental	4:28
10.	"Marupadiyum Oru Kadhal (Theme) 3"		Instrumental	4:43
11.	"Marupadiyum Oru Kadhal (Theme) 4"		Instrumental	4:24
12.	"Marupadiyum Oru Kadhal (Theme) 5"		Instrumental	4:23
13.	"Marupadiyum Oru Kadhal (Theme) 6"		Instrumental	5:04
Total length:				55:14

== Reception ==
The Times of India gave the film one-and-a-half out of five stars and wrote that "Coming back to the film, it is an amateurish attempt with poor detailing".
