= Rajiv Krishna =

Indian actor

- Born: Rajiv Gopalakrishnan; 15 January 1972 (age 54)
- Other names: Rajiv Krishna, Rajiv, Rajiv G. Menon
- Occupations: Actor; screenplay writer; author
- Years active: 1996–present
- Spouse: Dimple Varma
- Children: 1

Rajiv Krishna (born 15 January 1972) is an Indian actor from Bangalore. He has appeared in Tamil films in leading and supporting roles.

He also wrote the screenplay for the Hindi films Woodstock Villa and Soundtrack. He is the nephew of producer Suresh Menon. In 2013, he wrote a novel called Thundergod — Ascendence of Indra.

== Career ==
Rajiv Krishna made his Tamil debut with Aahaa..! (1997). Regarding his performance, one critic noted that "Rajiv's role is such that there is much scope for him to display his acting skills and he has utilised the opportunity well". Following the success of Aahaa, Rajiv Krishna received several other offers to continue appearing in lead roles. He signed on to a film titled Kai Vilakku featuring him alongside Sangita, but the film failed to release despite entering production. He was assistant director to Revathy on Mitr, My Friend (2002) and Phir Milenge (2004). He made his Bollywood debut Bas Yun Hi (2003) under the name Rajiv Gopalakrishnan. In the film, he starred opposite Nandita Das; however, the film failed to make a mark. He played negative roles in Newtonin Moondram Vidhi (2009) and Aasal (2010). He portrayed a mill owner in Krishnaveni Panjaalai (2012).

Menon is also a screenwriter, having written for Dus Kahaniyaan and Dhaakad. He also played the lead in Zen Katha, a play by Lilette Dubey.

== Filmography ==
=== Actor ===
Films

Year	Film	Role	Language	Notes
1996	Devaraagam	Parthasarathy	Malayalam	
1997	Aahaa..!	Sriram	Tamil	
1999	Manam Virumbuthe Unnai	Prakash	Tamil	
2002	Yai! Nee Romba Azhaga Irukke!	Bharath	Tamil	
2003	Bas Yun Hi	Rohan	Hindi	
2009	Newtonin Moondram Vidhi	Jaiprakash Narayanan (JP)	Tamil	
2010	Aasal	Vicky Jeevanandhan	Tamil	
2012	The King & the Commissioner	Major Abdul Jalal Rana	Malayalam	
2012	Krishnaveni Panjaalai	Krishnamoorthy	Tamil	
2015	En Vazhi Thani Vazhi	Danveer	Tamil	

Television

Year	Series	Role	Notes
1997	Doctors		
1994-1995	Chinna Chinna Aasaigal		Acted in stories "Pooja", "Manasu" and "Aarambam"

=== Writer ===
Year	Film	Writer	Language	Notes
2007	Dus Kahaniyaan	Yes	Hindi	Anthology film; segment: "Zahir"
2008	Woodstock Villa	Yes	Hindi	
2011	Soundtrack	Yes	Hindi	
2016	Girls	Screenplay consultant	Malayalam; Tamil	
2022	Dhaakad	Screenplay	Hindi	
