= Joshna Fernando =

Indian actress and model

- Born: 12 November 1991 (age 34); London, United Kingdom
- Occupations: Actress, Model
- Years active: 1999; 2012–present

Joshna Fernando (born 12 November 1991) is an Indian actress and model who has appeared in Tamil films.

== Early life ==
Born into a family with connections to the Tamil film industry, Joshna was exposed to cinema early and keen to appear in films from childhood. Her mother, Saroja, is a former actress who appeared in K. Balachander's Maro Charitra (1978) and Vaali's Vadamalai (1982). Her father, Stanley Fernando, was the brother of M. R. Radha's wife making Joshna a cousin to actress/producers Radhika and Nirosha. Joshna is also niece to Sujatha Vijaykumar a producer and mother-in-law to Tamil actor Ravi Mohan

== Career ==
Joshna made her acting debut, aged four, in Radhika Sarathkumar's tele-film Siragugal (1999), portraying the daughter of Vikram's character. In 2008, she made a return to Tamil films and began working on Marupadiyum Oru Kadhal (2012) appearing as Maheswari, a London-born medical student. Joshna was selected after the film makers wanted to cast an actress from London, and she subsequently worked on the film in London and Chennai. The film had a delayed release opened in 2012 to negative reviews, with a critic noting the lead pair "do look like they have the potential to shine in a better story". She also subsequently worked on an action film titled Kai in 2012. That same year Joshna was chosen to star alongside Ilayaraaja with his first ever on-screen appearance in the movie Naadi Thudikuthadi. The movie had been funded by the Fijian government and was shot in Fiji in an attempt to promote the countries' tourism, yet after the movies completion had been shelved due to issues with the production company. Another project she was working on, Rasu Madhuravan's Parthom Pazhaginom opposite actor Mayilsamy's son Anbu, was shelved soon after launch due to the sudden death of the director.

In 2013, she competed as a finalist in the Veet Miss Sri Lanka beauty pageant, as the sole British National. Subsequently, Joshna was brought in to feature in the action film Irumbu Kuthirai (2014) in November 2013, after actress Lakshmi Rai had walked out of the project, and Joshna subsequently shot for some sequences and a song with the cast in a schedule in Italy. However, in a turn of events in early 2014, Lakshmi Rai rejoined the project and Joshna's scenes in the particular role were edited out of the film. One scene featuring Joshna was used in the film, and was edited to make her appear as Lakshmi Rai's sister, who shows off several different superbikes to Adharvaa's and Priya Anand's characters in a warehouse.

She is currently modelling in the adult sector, most recently becoming the first ever Tamil actress to be officially signed to Playboy.

== Filmography ==
Year	Film	Role	Notes
1999	Siragugal	Shilpa	
2012	Marupadiyum Oru Kadhal	Maheswari	
2012	Kai	Priya	
2014	Irumbu Kuthirai	Christina's sister	
