= G. Kitcha =

Indian actor

Kicha
- Born: G. Krishnamoorthy; Tamil Nadu, India
- Occupation: Film director
- Years active: 1996–present
- Spouse: Tharani (Serial Actress)

Kicha is an Indian film director, who has directed Tamil films. After making his debut in 1996 with Nethaji, he has gone on to make other ventures including Thee and Maasi.

== Career ==
He began his career with Nethaji (1996), before re-emerging in the 2000s with a series of low budget films. In the late 2000s, he made a series of police films including Thee with Sundar C, Bhavani with Sneha and Maasi with Arjun. He also went on to produce his first film which he did not direct, making Prasath's Eppadi Manasukkul Vanthai (2012).

== Filmography ==
| Year | Film | Credited as | | | Notes |
| Year | Film | Director | Writer | Producer | Notes |
|---|---|---|---|---|---|
| 1996 | Nethaji | ✓ | ✓ | ✗ | |
| 2004 | Kavidhai | ✓ | ✓ | ✗ | |
| 2007 | Nanbanin Kadhali | ✓ | ✓ | ✗ | |
| 2008 | Thangam | ✓ | ✓ | ✓ | |
| 2009 | Thee | ✓ | ✓ | ✓ | |
| 2011 | Bhavani | ✓ | ✓ | ✓ | |
| 2012 | Maasi | ✓ | ✓ | ✗ | |
| 2012 | Eppadi Manasukkul Vanthai | ✗ | ✗ | ✓ | |
