= Suzhal (film) =

2012 Indian film by Jayan R. Krishna

- Theatrical release poster
- Directed by: Jayan R. Krishna
- Written by: Pradeep Sivasankar; Raveendranath
- Starring: Atul Kulkarni; Fariz; Hemachandran
- Cinematography: James Krish
- Edited by: B. Lenin
- Music by: L. V. Ganesh
- Production company: Whyte Infotainment
- Release date: 27 July 2012
- Running time: 122 mins
- Country: India
- Language: Tamil

Suzhal (transl. Whirlpool) is a 2012 Indian Tamil language thriller film directed by Jayan R. Krishna and starring Atul Kulkarni, Prathap K. Pothan, Fariz and Hemachandran. It was released on 27 July 2012.

== Cast ==
- Atul Kulkarni as Surya Narayanan
- Prathap K. Pothan as Daniel Mathews
- Nizhalgal Ravi as Lakshmipathi
- Fariz as Prabhu
- Hemachandran as Bharath
- Kadhal Sukumar as E&M Sakthi
- Charutha as Radhika
- Rosaline as Kaveri
- Saritha as Sarnalatha
- Neha as Charmila
- Poly Varghese as Jim
- Meera Krishnan as Prabhu's mother
- Meenal as Prabhu's sister
- Hareesh Peradi (uncredited)

== Production ==
Director R. Jayakumar had been associated with theatre scene in Chennai since the early 1990s and opted to make his directorial debut with editor B. Lenin's guidance. Atul Kulkarni was signed to play a key role along with 10 newcomers, including Fariz, who played the main lead. The film was shot for ten days on a ship heading towards Lakshadweep.

== Soundtrack ==
The music was composed by L. V. Ganesh, son of L. Vaidyanathan.

Track listing
No.	Title	Singer(s)	Length
1.	"Yaar Yaaro"	Raja Hasan
2.	"Solla Vandhen"	Hariharan, Sadhana Sargam
3.	"Vaa Nanba Vaa"	Benny Dayal, Suvi Suresh
4.	"Aadum Alai Mele"	Suvi Suresh
5.	"Mercury"	Blaaze, L. V. Muthukumarasamy, Prashanthini

== Release and reception ==
Suzhal was released in theatres on 27 July 2012. A review from The New Indian Express wrote "an interesting tale, if only it was original. A straight lift of the chilling French thriller 13 Tzameti (2005), the film faithfully followed the original with only minor changes for nativity." A reviewer from The Times of India wrote "both the script and its execution are immature to say the least and what should have been a tense cat-and-mouse game ends up as a joke that tests your patience." The film had a below average run at the box office.
