= Ajith Kumar filmography =

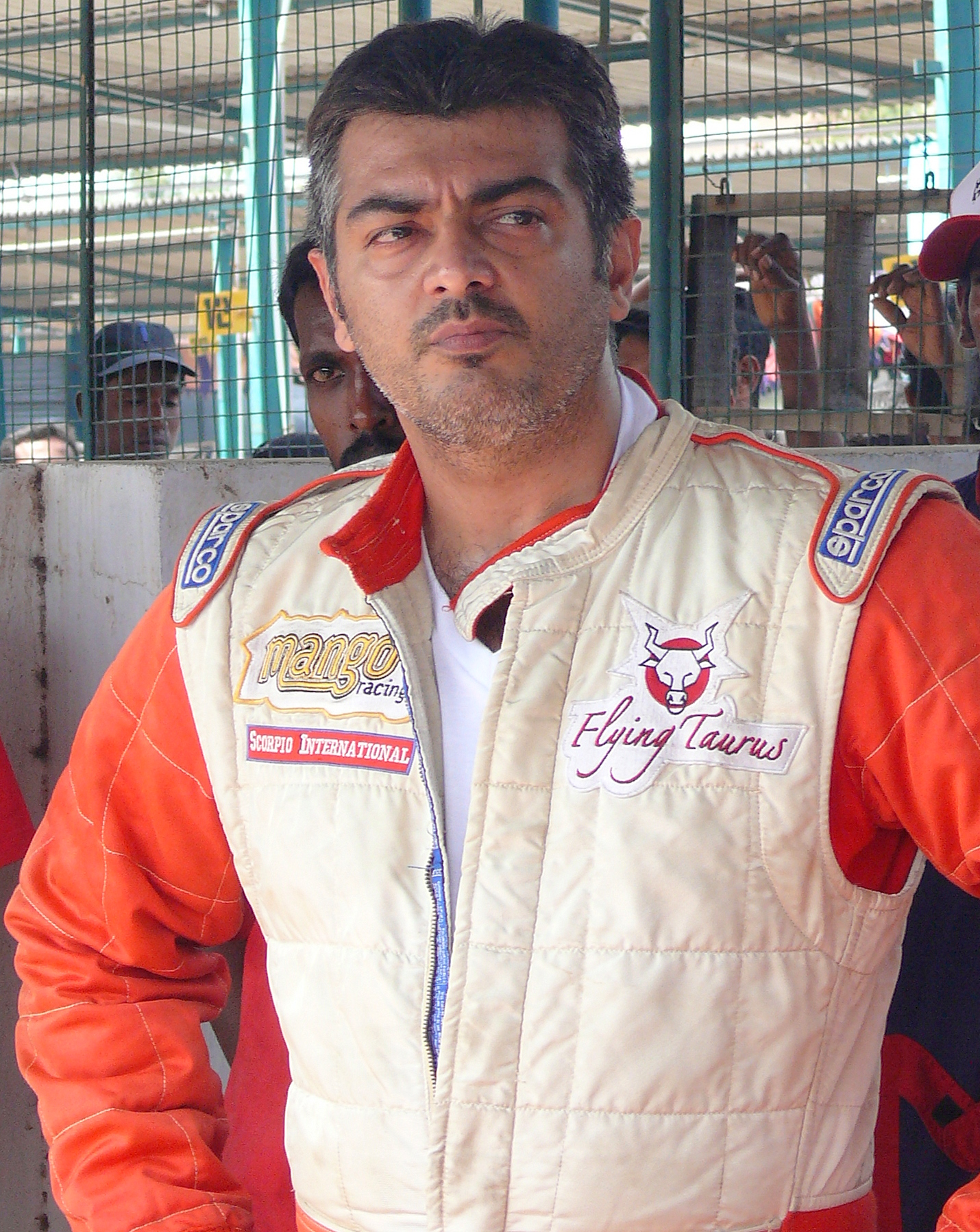
Ajith in 2010

Ajith Kumar is an Indian actor who works mainly in Tamil cinema. Apart from a small role in the 1990 Tamil film En Veedu En Kanavar, his professional career began three years later with his debut as a lead actor in Tamil cinema with Amaravathi (1993). Despite being a moderate success, the film helped him obtain more modelling assignments. He followed it up the same year with Prema Pusthakam, his only Telugu film to date. After Amaravathy's release, Ajith opted against acting, and instead tried pursuing a career in auto racing. While training for an amateur race, he injured his back and underwent three major surgeries, leaving him bed-ridden for a year and a half. After recovering from the injury, he played supporting roles in Paasamalargal (1994) and Pavithra (1994). After this, he co-starred with Vijay in Rajavin Parvaiyile (1995). That same year, he had his breakthrough with the romantic thriller Aasai. His performance earned him critical acclaim and established him as an up-and-coming actor in Tamil cinema.

He was next seen as the main lead in Agathiyan's epistolary Kadhal Kottai (1996), a critical and commercial success. In 1997, he had five releases, all of which were commercial failures. Ajith's dual portrayal of twin brothers—where one is deaf-mute—in S. J. Suryah's Vaalee (1999) won him his first Filmfare Award for Best Tamil Actor. Impressed with his performance in that film, Rajiv Menon cast Ajith in the ensemble drama Kandukondain Kandukondain (2000) which was also commercial and critical success. The following year, he collaborated with debutant director AR Murugadoss on the action film Dheena. The film was successful in establishing his reputation as an action hero and earning him the nickname "Thala" ("leader"). (Note: Ajith Kumar's character in the film is called by the nickname "Thala".) He earned critical acclaim for his dual role performance in the vigilante film Citizen (2001), and the film was commercial success. and a Best Actor nomination at Filmfare for the drama Poovellam Un Vasam (2001). His last release of the year was Santosh Sivan's Hindi film Aśoka, where he played a brief antagonistic role opposite Shah Rukh Khan. His -role performance as twin brothers in K. S. Ravikumar's film Villain (2002) won him a second Filmfare Award for Best Tamil Actor.

Between 2003 and 2005, Ajith cut back on his acting career to focus on his racing career. During this time, he had his only commercial success with Attahasam (2004). Two years later he starred in Ravikumar's Varalaru, in which he played three different roles. It became the highest-grossing Tamil film of that year, and Ajith went on to receive his third Best Tamil Actor award at Filmfare for his performance. In 2007 he was seen in two remakes—Kireedam and Billa, (Note: Kireedam was a remake of the namesake 1989 Malayalam film while Billa was a remake of the 1980 Tamil film of the same name.) both of which were big box office hits. His next two releases, Aegan (2008) and Aasal (2010), were critical and commercial failures.

Ajith played an antihero—as a money-minded, suspended police officer—in Venkat Prabhu's Mankatha (2011). (Note: It was Ajith Kumar's 50th film.) It had the biggest opening of that year for a Tamil film, (Note: The film grossed ₹252 million in its first week.) and became Ajith's biggest commercial success to that point. His next release, Billa II (2012), Tamil cinema's first prequel, (Note: The film was a prequel to his 2007 film of the same name.) opened to mixed reviews. He followed that with the multi-starrer Arrambam (2013) and Siva's masala film Veeram (2014), both of which were commercially successful. In 2015 he collaborated with Gautham Vasudev Menon for the crime thriller Yennai Arindhaal. His performance as an undercover police officer earned him a Best Tamil Actor nomination at the 63rd Filmfare Awards South. His second release of the year, Vedalam, had the biggest opening day in Tamil cinema and was among the highest grossing Tamil films of the year.

== Film ==
Key
†	Denotes films that have not yet been released

- All films are in Tamil, unless otherwise noted.

List of Ajith Kumar film credits
Year	Film	Role(s)	Notes	Ref.
1990	En Veedu En Kanavar	School boy	Child artist	
1993	Amaravathy	Arjun	Debut as lead actor	
1993	Prema Pusthakam	Sreekar	Telugu film; credited as Sreekar	
1994	Paasamalargal	Kumar		
1994	Pavithra	Ashok		
1995	Rajavin Parvaiyile	Chandru		
1995	Aasai	Jeevanantham		
1996	Vaanmathi	Krishna		
1996	Kalloori Vaasal	Vasanth		
1996	Minor Mappillai	Ramu		
1996	Kadhal Kottai	Surya		
1997	Nesam	Ranganathan		
1997	Raasi	Kumar		
1997	Ullaasam	Guru		
1997	Pagaivan	Prabhu		
1997	Rettai Jadai Vayasu	Vijay		
1998	Kaadhal Mannan	Shiva		
1998	Aval Varuvala	Jeeva		
1998	Unnidathil Ennai Koduthen	Sanjay	Cameo	
1998	Uyirodu Uyiraga	Ajay		
1999	Thodarum	Jayaram		
1999	Unnai Thedi	Raghu		
1999	Vaalee	Shiva/Deva (Note: Ajith Kumar played two characters.)		
1999	Anantha Poongatre	Jeeva		
1999	Amarkkalam	Vasu	25th film (Note: This was Ajith's 25th film)	
1999	Nee Varuvai Ena	Subramani	Extended Cameo	
2000	Mugavaree	Sridhar		
2000	Kandukondain Kandukondain	Manohar		
2000	Unnai Kodu Ennai Tharuven	Surya		
2001	Dheena	Dheenadhayalan (Thala) (Note: Ajith Kumar played a character with two or more names.)		
2001	Citizen	Citizen/Subramani		
2001	Poovellam Un Vasam	Chinna		
2001	Aśoka	Susima	Hindi film; special appearance	
2002	Red	Red		
2002	Raja	Raja		
2002	Villain	Shiva/Vishnu		
2003	Ennai Thalatta Varuvala	Sathish	Extended Cameo	
2003	Anjaneya	Paramaguru		
2004	Jana	Janarthanan		
2004	Attahasam	Guru/Jeeva		
2005	Ji	Vasu		
2006	Paramasivan	Subramaniyam Siva (Paramasivan)		
2006	Thirupathi	Thirupathi		
2006	Varalaru	Shivashankar /Vishnu / Jeeva (Note: Ajith Kumar played three characters.)		
2007	Aalwar	Shiva		
2007	Kireedam	Sakthivel		
2007	Billa	David Billa / Saravanavelu		
2008	Aegan	Shiva		
2010	Aasal	Jeevanantham / Shiva	Also screenwriter	
2011	Mankatha	Vinayak Mahadevan	50th film	
2012	Billa II	David Billa		
2012	English Vinglish	A flight passenger	Tamil version of the Hindi film (Note: It was originally filmed in Hindi with a few scenes additionally shot for the Tamil version. Ajith Kumar played the role of Amitabh Bachchan in the Tamil dubbed version.); Cameo	
2013	Arrambam	Ashok Kumar		
2014	Veeram	Vinayagam		
2015	Yennai Arindhaal	Sathyadev		
2015	Vedalam	Ganesh (Vedalam)		
2017	Vivegam	Ajay Kumar (AK)		
2019	Viswasam	Thookku Durai		
2019	Nerkonda Paarvai	Bharath Subramaniam		
2022	Valimai	Arjun Kumar		
2023	Thunivu	Dark Devil		
2025	Vidaamuyarchi	Arjun		
2025	Good Bad Ugly	AK (Red Dragon)		
2027	30 Years later			
2028	61 years later			
2029	92 years later Chapter 3			
2030	123 years later chapter 4			
TBA	Gladiators – In Pursuit of Challenge †	TBA	Documentary film	
TBA	Dare Devil †	Dare Devil	Pre-Production	

== See also ==
- List of awards and nominations received by Ajith Kumar
