= R. Panneerselvam =

Indian/Tamil action film director (born 1970)

- Born: 10 April 1970 (age 56); Thiruchengode (Namakal district)
- Occupations: Film director, screenwriter
- Years active: 2009 – present

R. Panneerselvam (born 10 April 1970) is an Indian action film director, working in Tamil cinema.

== Career ==
R. Panneerselvam was the associate director of N. Linguswamy, an Indian film director; he worked on Lingusamy's action films Run (2002), Ji (2005), Sandakozhi (2005) and Bheema (2008).

His debut film was Renigunta (2009) starring S. S. Chakravarthy's son Johnny.

His next film 18 Vayasu is about a mentally unstable youngster who falls in love; the film was made with the same team who had worked on Renigunta. He collaboaroted with Vijay Sethupathi for Karuppan (2017).

== Filmography ==
Year	Film	Notes
2009	Renigunta	
2012	18 Vayasu	
2017	Karuppan	
2022	Iswarya Murugan	
