= Mathapoo =

2013 Indian film by Nagaraj

- Directed by: Nagaraj
- Written by: Nagaraj
- Produced by: S. Sudalaikanraja
- Starring: Jayan; Gayathrie
- Cinematography: C.R. Maravarman
- Edited by: G.K. Mahesh
- Music by: Velayudham; Sabesh–Murali (score)
- Production company: Vinayaka Productions
- Release date: 13 September 2013
- Running time: 160 minutes
- Country: India
- Language: Tamil

Mathapoo (transl. Sparkler) is a 2013 Indian Tamil-language romantic drama film directed by Nagaraj and starring newcomer Jayan and Gayathrie.

== Cast ==
- Jayan as Karthik
- Gayathrie as Pooja
- Geetha as Pooja's mother
- Sithara as Karthik's aunty
- Ilavarasu as Karthik's uncle
- Renuka as Karthik's mother
- Kitty as Pooja's father
- Pradeep Kottayam as Restaurant worker
- Vivek Rajgopal as Maali
- Senthi Kumari as Maid
- L. Raja as Police inspector

== Production ==
The film was directed by Nagaraj, who previously directed the film Dhinamdhorum (1998) and wrote the dialogues for Minnale (2001) and Kaakha Kaakha (2003). Jayan, a graduate of DG Vaishnav College, made his acting debut with this film. Gayathrie of 18 Vayasu and Naduvula Konjam Pakkatha Kaanom fame was signed as the main female actress. Velayudham was signed as the music director of the film. He learned music from Veeraraghavan, M. S. Viswanathan's teacher. Music duo Sabesh–Murali composed the background score for the film. The cast and crew were finalized after eight to nine months. The film was shot in sixty days.

== Soundtrack ==
The songs were composed by Velayudham. An audio launch was held on 24 April 2013 after being postponed from December 2012. Several celebrities including K. Bhagyaraj, S. P. Jananathan, Balasekaran, Azhagam Perumal, Pandiraj, Suseenthiran, Sasi and Kalanjiyam attended the event.

Song title	Lyricist	Singer(s)
"Adada Idhayam Parakiradhe"	Arivazhagan	Harish Raghavendra
"Avaarampoo Onnu"	J. Francis Kripa	Karthik
"Suda Suda Odum Kaatru"	Na. Muthukumar	Prasanna
"Unparvai Velichaththile"	Na. Muthukumar	Harish Raghavendra
"Yaaridamum Sollaadhe"	Na. Muthukumar	Chinmayi
"Nill Nilave"	Na. Muthukumar	Karthik

== Reception ==
The Times of India gave the film two out of five stars and wrote that "What makes this protracted film just that bit bearable are the supporting actors who makes us relate to the characters". Behindwoods gave the film one-and-a-half out of five stars and write that "The excessively slow paced drama also gives a TV ‘mega-serial’ effect every now and then". A critic from Maalaimalar called the film old.
