= Raasi =

Raasi may refer to:

- Raasi (film), a 1997 Tamil drama film
- Raasi (actress), South Indian actress
