= Karuppan =

2017 Indian film by R. Panneerselvam

- Theatrical release poster
- Directed by: R. Panneerselvam
- Written by: R. Panneerselvam
- Produced by: A. M. Rathnam (presenter); S. Aishwarya
- Starring: Vijay Sethupathi; Tanya Ravichandran; Bobby Simha; Pasupathy
- Cinematography: K. A. Sakthivel
- Edited by: V. T. Vijayan
- Music by: D. Imman
- Production company: Shri Sai Raam Creations
- Distributed by: Picture Box Company
- Release date: 29 September 2017
- Running time: 138 minutes
- Country: India
- Language: Tamil

Karuppan is a 2017 Indian Tamil-language action drama film written and directed by R. Panneerselvam, starring Vijay Sethupathi, Tanya Ravichandran, Bobby Simha and Pasupathy. The film began production in January 2017 and concluded that May. It was released on 29 September 2017.

== Plot ==
Karuppan lives by earning as a daily wager, although he has land for farming. His father died at an early age, and his mother was ill. He is accompanied by his maternal uncle. Karuppan is very much in bull taming (jallikattu). Maayi is a well-respected man in the village. He has a younger sister, Anbuselvi, and is searching for the right groom for her. On a jallikattu event, Maayi challenges Karuppan to tame his bull. During their conversation, he tells Karuppan that he will get his sister married to Karuppan if he tamed his bull. Karuppan then tamed Maayi's bull. Anbu was initially reluctant, but she married Karuppan due to his good character and for her brother. However, Maayi's brother-in-law Kathir, who had a crush on Anbu, wants to separate Karuppan and Anbu. He hatches and executes plans to do so. Thus, the story goes on and moves to the climax where all of Kathir's plans are exposed and he gets killed by Muthu. Due to his unwavering care and love for his sister, Maayi surrenders to the killing and is sentenced to jail for up to five years. Karuppan and Anbu come to meet Maayi in jail and reveal to him that Anbu is pregnant. The film ends with the couple waiting for the birth and release of Maayi.

== Cast ==
- Vijay Sethupathi as Karuppan
- Tanya Ravichandran as Anbuselvi Karuppan
- Bobby Simha as Kathir
- Pasupathy as Maayi (Anbuselvi's brother)
- Kaveri as Muthu (Maayi's wife)
- Singampuli as Karuppan's uncle
- Renuka as Karuppan's mother
- Sharath Lohitashwa as Varasanattu Perusu
- Linga
- Thavasi

== Production ==
Director R. Panneerselvam announced in September 2016 that he would collaborate with Vijay Sethupathi for a film. Produced by A. M. Rathnam, the team initially cast Ritika Singh as the lead actress, but she was replaced by Lakshmi Menon before production had begun. Menon later pulled out of the film citing an injury and was replaced by Tanya Ravichandran. Bobby Simha agreed to play the antagonist in the film, despite earlier opting to star only in leading roles. Following a launch event held in December 2016, the team began filming sequences in Theni on 11 January 2017, and wrapped on 12 May the same year.

== Controversy ==
Kaathan, the owner of the bull which was used in the first look poster, alleged that the producers of Karuppan had not obtained his permission to use his bull's picture. He added that Komban, the aforementioned bull, had not been tamed by anyone to that point and had a huge fan following for that reason. Kaathan demanded an unconditional apology from the director, producer and lead actor.

== Soundtrack ==
The soundtrack is composed by D. Imman.

All lyrics are written by Yugabharathi.

Track listing
No.	Title	Singer(s)	Length
1.	"Karuva Karuva Payale"	Shankar Mahadevan, Shashaa Tirupati	4:22
2.	"Usure Usure"	Ananya Bhat	4:39
3.	"Olaga Vaayaadi"	Benny Dayal	4:32
4.	"Azhagazhaga"	Pradeep Kumar	4:42
5.	"Murukkumeesa Maama"	Diwakar, Anita Venkat	5:14
6.	"Azhagazhaga" (Karaoke)		4:42
7.	"Usure Usure" (Karaoke)		4:38
8.	"Karuva Karuva Payale" (Karaoke)		4:21
Total length:			37:10

== Critical reception ==
Baradwaj Rangan wrote for Film Companion, "Karuppan is an unabashed shrine to Vijay Sethupathi, who does fascinating things that seem halfway between deliberate acting choices and showing up on the set and doing the first thing that came to mind." Priyanka Thirumurthy of The News Minute felt the film's "good actors" were wasted due to the "excruciatingly slow plot and stale storyline".
