= List of awards and nominations received by Ajith Kumar =

Ajith Kumar awards and nominations
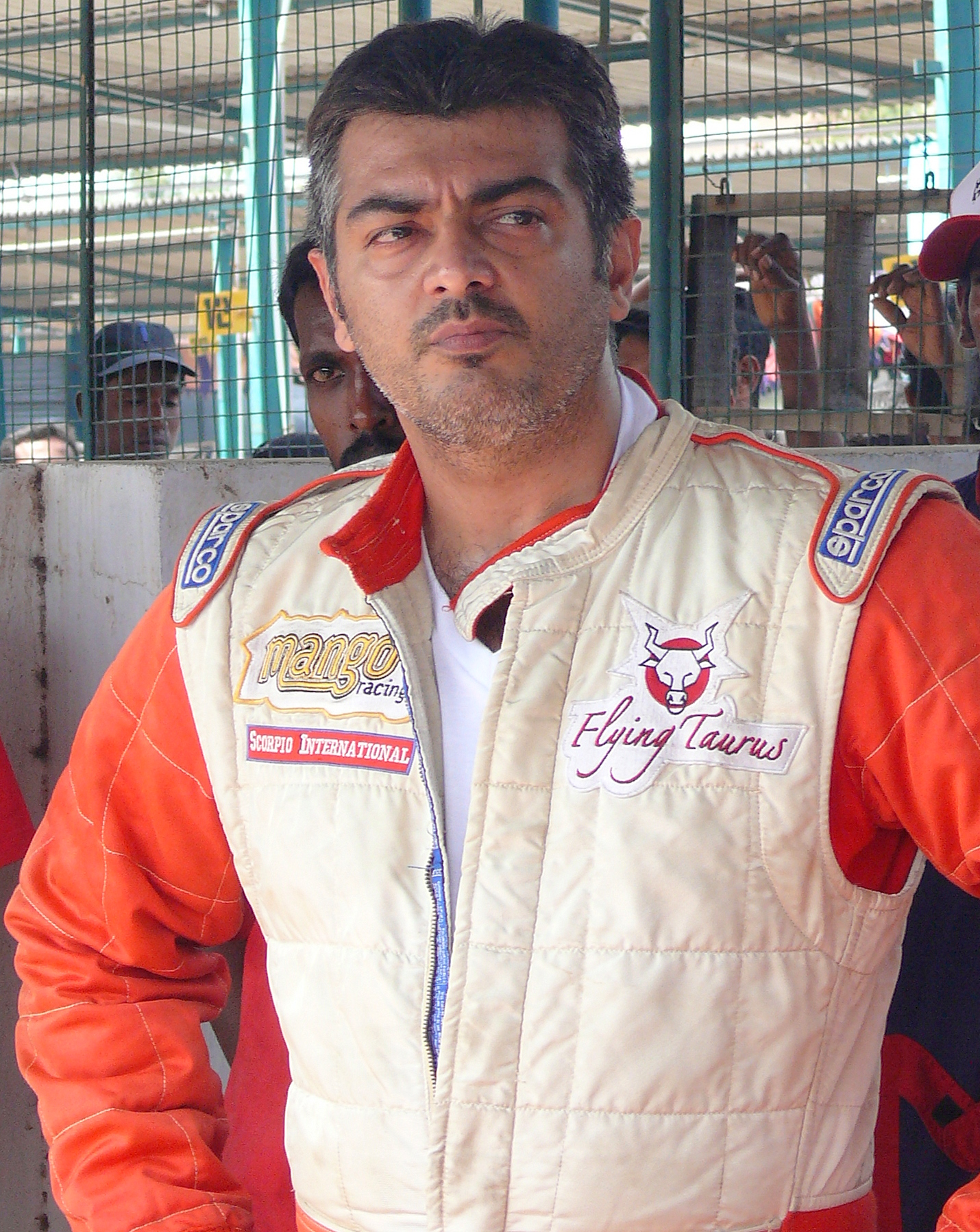
- Kumar in 2010
Awards & nominations
Award	Won	Nom
Cinema Express Awards	3	7
Dinakaran Cinema Awards	1	1
Filmfare Awards South	3	6
South Indian International Movie Awards	0	6
Tamil Nadu State Film Awards	3	6
Vijay Awards	4	13
Other honors	18	20
Padma Bhushan	1	1
- Total number of awards and nominations (Note: Certain award groups do not simply award one winner. They recognize several different recipients, have runners-up and have third place. Since this is a specific recognition and is different from losing an award, runner-up mentions are considered wins in this award tally. Awards in certain categories do not have prior nominations and only winners are announced by the jury. For simplification and to avoid errors, each award in this list has been presumed to have had a prior nomination. Actor Ajith Kumar received the Padma Bhushan, India’s third-highest civilian honour, from the President of India, Droupadi Murmu, at the Rashtrapati Bhavan in New Delhi on April 28. The actor, as announced in January, is among the 19 Padma Bhushan awardees announced by the Union Government.)
Totals	33	'62'
- References

== Civilian honours ==
No.	Image	Ribbon	Decoration	Field	Conferred date	Conferred by	Presenter	Ref.
1			Padma Bhushan (Third Highest Civilian Award of India)	Art	28 April 2025	Government of India	Droupadi Murmu	

== Major associations ==
=== Cinema Express Awards ===
The Cinema Express Awards are presented annually by Indian Express Group to honour artistic excellence of professionals in the south Indian film industry which comprises Tamil, Telugu, Kannada and Malayalam film industries.

Year	Film	Category	Result	Ref.
1999	Vaalee / Amarkkalam	Best Actor – Tamil	Won	
2000	Mugavaree	Best Actor – Tamil	Won	
2001	Citizen	Best Actor – Tamil	Won	

=== Filmfare Awards South ===
The Filmfare Awards South is the South Indian segment of the annual Filmfare Awards, presented by The Times Group to honour both artistic and technical excellence of professionals in the South Indian film industry. The awards are separately given for Kannada, Tamil, Telugu and Malayalam films.

Year	Film	Category	Result	Ref.
1995	Aasai	Best Actor – Tamil	Nominated	
2000	Vaalee	Best Actor – Tamil	Won	
2002	Poovellam Un Vasam	Best Actor – Tamil	Nominated	
2003	Villain	Best Actor – Tamil	Won	
2007	Varalaru	Best Actor – Tamil	Won	
2008	Billa	Best Actor – Tamil	Nominated	
2012	Mankatha	Best Actor – Tamil	Nominated	
2014	Arrambam	Best Actor – Tamil	Nominated	
2015	Veeram	Best Actor – Tamil	Nominated	
2016	Yennai Arindhaal	Best Actor – Tamil	Nominated	

=== South Indian International Movie Awards ===
The South Indian International Movie Awards are rewards the artistic and technical achievements of the South Indian film industry.

Year	Film	Category	Result	Ref.
2012	Mankatha	Best Actor – Tamil	Nominated	
2021	Viswasam	Best Actor – Tamil	Nominated	

=== Tamil Nadu State Film Awards ===
The Tamil Nadu State Film Awards are the most notable film awards given for Tamil films in India. They are given annually to honour the best talents and provide encouragement and incentive to the South Indian film industry by the Government of Tamil Nadu.

Year	Film	Category	Result	Ref.
2001	Poovellam Un Vasam	Special Prize	Won	
2006	Varalaru	Special Prize	Won	
2006	—N/a	Honorary Award – MGR Award	Won	

== Major regional associations ==
=== Chennai Times Film Awards ===
The Chennai Times Film Awards presented by The Times of India to celebrate the best in the Tamil film industry.

Year	Film	Category	Result	Ref.
2012	Mankatha	Best Actor	Won	
2013	Billa II	Best Actor	Nominated	

=== Dinakaran Cinema Awards ===
The Dinakaran Cinema Awards are presented to the best artistes and technicians of Tamil Cinema (of the respective year), on behalf of Dinakaran Tamil daily newspaper. Readers of Dinakaran paper choose these award winners.

Year	Film	Category	Result	Ref.
1999	Vaalee	Best Actor	Won	
2002	Villain	Best Actor	Won	

=== Kalaimamani Awards ===
The Kalaimamani is an award in Tamil Nadu state, India. These awards are given by the Tamil Nadu Iyal Isai Nataka Manram (literature, music and theatre) for excellence in the field of art and literature.

Year	Film	Category	Result	Ref.
2000	—N/a	Art and Literature	Won	

=== Vijay Awards ===
The Vijay Awards are presented by the Tamil television channel STAR Vijay to honour excellence in Tamil cinema.

Year	Film	Category	Result	Ref.
2007	Varalaru	Best Actor	Won	
2007	Varalaru	Favourite Hero	Won	
2008	Billa	Favourite Hero	Nominated	
2008	Billa	Best Actor	Nominated	
2009	Aegan	Favourite Hero	Nominated	
2011	Asal	Favourite Hero	Nominated	
2012	Mankatha	Best Villain	Won	
2012	Mankatha	Favourite Hero	Won	
2013	Billa II	Favourite Hero	Nominated	
2014	Arrambam	Favourite Hero	Nominated	
2015	Veeram	Favourite Hero	Nominated	
2018	Vivegam	Favourite Hero	Nominated	

=== Zee Cine Awards – Tamil ===
The Zee Cine Awards – Tamil is an annual award ceremony organised by the Zee Entertainment Enterprises.

Year	Film	Category	Result	Ref.
2019	Various Movies	Most Empowering Performer of the Decade	Won	
2019	Viswasam	Favorite Hero	Nominated	
2019	Viswasam	Best Actor	Nominated	

== Motorsport awards ==
Name of awarding body, year presented, award category, nominee(s) of the award, and the result of the nomination
Awarding body	Year	Category	Nominee(s)/work(s)	Result	Ref.
SRO Motorsports Group Awards	2025	Philippe Charriol Award - Gentleman Driver of the Year	Ajith Kumar	Won	

== See also ==
- Ajith Kumar filmography
