= 18 Vayasu =

2012 Indian film by R. Panneerselvam

- Film poster
- Directed by: R. Panneerselvam
- Written by: R. Panneerselvam
- Produced by: S. S. Chakravarthy
- Starring: Johnny; Gayathrie
- Cinematography: Shakthi
- Edited by: Anthony Gonsalves
- Music by: Charles Bosco; Dinesh Kanagaratnam
- Production company: Nic Arts
- Release date: 24 August 2012
- Country: India
- Language: Tamil

18 Vayasu (transl. 18 years old) is a 2012 Indian Tamil-language romantic psychological thriller film written and directed by R. Panneerselvam and produced by S. S. Chakravarthy. The film stars Chakravarthy's son Johnny and Gayathrie in her debut. It revolves around a man who develops a mental disorder of being animalistic due to childhood trauma. The film was released on 24 August 2012.

== Plot ==
Karthik develops a mental disorder after seeing his father commit suicide. He displays animalistic behaviour whenever he is anxious. As he grows up, he meets Gayathri, an orphan. Gayathri is constantly harassed by her caretaker, whereas Karthik is ill-treated by his mother. This is due to her life with her paramour, which affects him a lot. One day, Karthik kills his mother. Gayathri is shocked and decides to end the relationship with Karthik, who runs away, fearing the law. Whether Karthik succeeds in winning back Gayathri's love is what the rest of the film is about.

== Cast ==
- Johnny as Karthik
- Gayathrie as Gayathri
- Rohini as Dr. Suchithra
- Sathyendra as Jocky
- Yuvarani as Karthik's mother
- Mohammed Fazil as Karthik's friend
- J. Senthil Kumar as Police officer
- Sevazhai as Police officer
- Dr. Suri as Karthik's mother's paramour
- Krishna Davinci as Dr. Suchitra's husband
- Gnanavel as Gayathri's caretaker

== Production ==
The film was shot in Chennai, Madurai, Theni and Tiruchengode. It became the film debut of Gayathrie after her first completed project Yen Ippadi Mayakkinai failed to release.

== Soundtrack ==
The music was composed by Sri Lankan musicians Charles Bosco and Dinesh Kanagaratnam, in their debut at composing for an Indian Tamil film. Karthik of Milliblog wrote, "Dinesh and Charles Bosco's music starts off fairly well, but goes terribly haywire and leaves the soundtrack in lurch".

Track listing
No.	Title	Lyrics	Singer(s)	Length
1.	"Entha Ulagil"	Na. Muthukumar	Naresh Iyer	5:53
2.	"Aanum Illa"	Yugabharathi	Chitti	3:53
3.	"Enakkenave Nee"	Yugabharathi	Haricharan	5:31
4.	"Unnai Ondru"	Na. Muthukumar	Sriram Parthasarathy	5:53
5.	"Theme Music"	Dinesh	Dinesh	2:28
6.	"Podi Pennae"	Yugabharathi	Benny Dayal	4:10
Total length:				27:48

== Release and reception ==
18 Vayasu was initially scheduled to release on 28 July 2012, but ultimately released almost a month later, on 24 August. Vivek Ramz of In.com wrote, "Even though Director Paneer Selvam has a new premise, he lets it go loose with lot of loopholes in the script. He has tried to make the offbeat theme into a mainstream one and failed miserably in doing the same." K.R. Manigandan of The Hindu wrote that Johnny was unconvincing because his character was not well etched, but praised Gayathrie's performance and the cinematography, concluding, "18 Vayasu is a film that could have been a lot better, had the script been taut". Malini Mannath from The New Indian Express wrote, "18 Vayasu does make the effort. But it falls short of Renigunta, which had a far more coherent screenplay and a more gripping narrative". The Times of India wrote, "A tighter editing could have made 18 Vayasu, more thrilling to watch. Panneerselvam also could have etched out the supporting cast better".
