= Pechi =

Indian horror film

- Theatrical release poster
- Directed by: Ramachandran B
- Written by: Ramachandran B/ Vaz
- Starring: Gayathrie; Bala Saravanan; Preethi Nedumaran; Dev Ramnath
- Cinematography: Parthiban D.F.Tech
- Edited by: Ignatious Aswin
- Music by: Rajesh Murugesan
- Production companies: Veyilon Entertainment; Verus Productions
- Release date: 2 August 2024
- Country: India
- Language: Tamil

Pechi is a 2024 Indian Tamil-language horror film written and directed by Ramachandran B, based on a story by Vaz. The film stars Gayathrie, Bala Saravanan, with Preethi Nedumaran and Dev Ramnath in supporting roles.

== Plot ==
A couple is seen strolling happily through Aranmanaikaadu, Kollimalai. As night begins to fall, they set up camp, and the husband, Ram, ventures out to gather firewood. While searching, he comes across a Trishul near a massive tree and attempts to chop off a branch. Despite his best efforts, he struggles to axe the branch, but eventually succeeds, only to be surprised by the presence of an iron nail where the branch detached. He notices a strange protrusion emerging from within the tree. Suddenly, he finds himself unable to speak or call out to his wife, who is sitting at a distance, oblivious to the situation, with her headphones on. A wooden witchcraft poppet falls from the tree hole, leaving him horrified and fleeing for his life from an unseen force. Meanwhile, the wife becomes petrified when she realizes her husband is missing and spots the witchcraft doll, prompting her to scream as the screen fades to black.

A few months later, Maari, a forest guard and part-time guide, receives instructions from his boss, Ashok, to escort his friends into the reserved forest, formerly a government-owned coffee plantation. As they head towards the forest, Maari's daughter stops the car and hands him a sacred amulet. Before entering the forest, they encounter a rugged man driving a pickup, who seems to give them a malevolent stare. Eventually, the five friends, Charan, Meena, Sethu, Charu, and Jerry accompanied by Maari, begin their trek. Meena grows frustrated with Maari as he continually cautions them to behave properly and avoid disturbing the forest. Despite his warnings, they stumble upon a blocked pathway leading to Maayankaadu, a restricted area. Ignoring the warning signs, they clear the blockage, prompting Maari to reiterate his concerns. The friends become annoyed with Maari and demand an explanation for his behavior. Maari explains that the forest has deep-rooted folklore and that the local villagers, who rely on the forest for their livelihood, respect and avoid disturbing the natural balance.

Despite Maari's warnings, the group ventures into the restricted forest, with Maari reluctantly accompanying them. Charu becomes distracted by a noise and wanders away, finding herself at the edge of a cliff, where Maari rescues her just in time. Eventually, they arrive at a viewpoint and set up camp nearby. While attempting to take a photo, Jerry slips down seeing a terrifying figure, and becomes frightened, only to realize he has become separated from his friends. Panicked and distressed, Jerry returns to the camp and claims that someone pulled his leg, but his friends mock him, leading to an argument. Jerry challenges Sethu and Charu to visit the warning board they saw earlier, tie a scarf around it, and record it on their phone as proof. Maari warns them again, but the duo disregards his advice and sets off. Deep in the forest, Charu and Sethu stumble upon a dilapidated house and enter it, discovering a haunting atmosphere and eerie witchcraft dolls. As Charu tries to take a selfie, she is horrified by the sudden appearance of an unknown figure. To their shock, they see Jerry's scarf hanging high on a tree branch.

As time passes, Maari and Charan search for Charu and Sethu at the warning board area, but they are nowhere to be found. They hear Charu's scream and rush towards the sound, only to discover Charu lying motionless. However, it turns out to be a prank, and Charan becomes enraged. When Maari and Charan return to the campsite, they are astonished to find Sethu and Charu already present and realize that no one has accompanied them. Maari reveals that Charu had mistakenly entered Pechi's house and tells the story about Pechi.

Pechi, a woman from a prestigious family, had learned black magic in Kerala and returned to the forest, where she performed satanic rituals and human sacrifices to appease her demonic gods. The villagers, aware of her activities, attempted to capture her but were subdued by her black magic. A saint informed them that Pechi had become immortal and that her human sacrifices were offerings to the demonic god. The saint advised that Pechi couldn't be destroyed, only trapped through invocation. With the saint's help, the villagers successfully killed Pechi, trapped her soul in a wooden witchcraft poppet, and nailed it to a tree, which Ram had inadvertently released earlier. They buried her corpse nearby and performed rituals to confine her spirit within the restricted area, marked by the warning board, to prevent her from entering the village.

Although skeptical, the friends decide to leave the forest immediately. Jerry remembers his missing camera and returns to retrieve it, accompanied by Maari, who is actually the impersonated Pechi. Jerry ends up in Pechi's house and screams for help. Maari and Charan search for Jerry but find a camera recording of Ram and his wife's brutal murder instead. They return to the campsite, where Sethu and Meena accuse Maari of killing Jerry. Sethu chases Maari where he enters the restricted area, but the sacred amulet protects him, while Sethu gets killed by Pechi who is impersonated as Jerry. Pechi kills Charu in front of Charan and Meena. Meena is trapped in Pechi's house but is unharmed. Maari rescues Charan and Meena and urges them to descend the hill quickly, assuring them that the amulet, gifted by the saint to his forefathers, will protect them from demonic forces. During their escape, Meena is pulled away into the restricted area, and Charan leaves Maari behind to search for her. Although unable to find Meena, Charan remains unaffected, clutching the sacred amulet that had come loose from Maari's neck during a scuffle. Charan returns to find Maari dead but somehow flees the forest. He comes across a car and the rugged man from earlier encounter is driving it, who seems to help him inside the car, but is shocked to see Meena inside. However, he is beaten by the thug and taken to Pechi's house, where he is tied up.

It is then revealed that Meena, a bloodline descendant of Pechi, had intentionally befriended Charan, Sethu, Charu, and Jerry. Her grandmother who wakes up once Pechi is released from the tree, knows that 13 more human sacrifices from Pechi are needed to satiate the demon. For that, Meena with the help of the thug, assists Pechi by bringing people to the forest for sacrifice and also kills Maari. Back to present, Charan is left tied while the two exit the house, while Pechi makes her appearance. The film concludes with the completion of 6 human sacrifices and 7 remaining in Pechi's account. Once Pechi's quota is fulfilled, Meena's own human sacrifices will commence, perpetuating the sinister cycle. The film ends with another group of people entering the forest in search of the previous trekkers.

== Cast ==
- Gayathrie Shankar as Meena
- Bala Saravanan as Maari
- Preethi Nedumaran as Charu
- Dev as Charan
- Jana as Sethu
- Mageshwaran as Jerry
- Seeniammaal as Pechi
- Murali Ram as Ram
- Aadhirai Soundarajan as Ram's wife
- Shanthimani as Meena's grandmother
- Rajapandi as Guardsman
- Vaz as Thug

== Production ==
The film is based on an eponymous short film directed by Ramachandran written by Vaz The film was produced by Gokul Benoy, Shaik Mujeeb under the banner of Veyilon Entertainment & Verus Productions. The cinematography was done by Parthiban D.F.Tech while editing was handled by Ignatious Aswin and music composed by Rajesh Murugesan.

== Release ==
=== Theatrical ===
The film was released on 2 August 2024 in theatres. It was declared hit with its unique take on pure horror film and had a packed house theatre run for over three weeks in various multiplexes.

=== Home media ===
The film had its digital premiere on the streaming platforms Prime Video and Aha Tamil from 20 September 2024. It held its position on top 10 streamed films of Prime Video in India for more than 3 weeks. And was the second most searched horror film on Google for over a month.

== Reception ==
Abhinav Subramanian of The Times of India gave it two-and-a-half out of five stars and wrote, "Pechi offers some chills but struggles in delivering a coherent supernatural tale." A critic from Hindustan Times Tamil gave the film three out of five stars and wrote that it is a one-time watchable film and it will give new experience to horror fans.
