= Gayathrie Shankar =

Indian actress

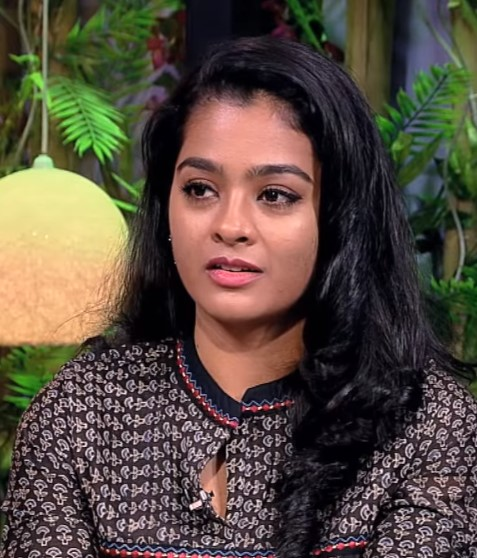
- Gayathrie in 2018
- Born: Bangalore, Karnataka, India
- Occupation: Actress
- Years active: 2012–present
- Awards: SIIMA Best Female Debut – Malayalam (2023)

Gayathrie Shankar is an Indian actress who primarily appears in Tamil films. She made her acting debut with the Tamil film 18 Vayasu (2012) . Her notable films include Naduvula Konjam Pakkatha Kaanom (2012), Puriyadha Pudhir (2017), Super Deluxe (2019), K- 13 (2019) and Vikram (2022), which is her highest grossing release. Gayathrie expanded to Malayalam films with Nna Thaan Case Kodu (2022), which earned her the SIIMA Award for Best Female Debut – Malayalam.

== Early life ==
Gayathrie was born and brought up in Bangalore. She is half Malayali.

== Career ==
Gayathire made her screen debut with the psychological thriller 18 Vayasu (2012), and gained recognition for her work in Naduvula Konjam Pakkatha Kaanom opposite Vijay Sethupathi, in the same year. In 2013 she starred in two films, Ponmaalai Pozhudhu and Mathapoo. In 2014, she appeared in Rummy (2014), a 1980s college love story opposite Inigo Prabhakaran. After a two year hiatus, she appeared in the 2017 film Puriyatha Puthir reuniting with Vijay Sethupathi. In 2018, she had two releases, a dark comedy, Oru Nalla Naal Paathu Solren and drama film Seethakaathi. That year, Gayathrie also made her web debut with Vella Raja opposite Bobby Simha.

Gayathrie had five releases in 2019. She first appeared in the films Chithiram Pesuthadi 2, Super Deluxe, K- 13 and Oththa Seruppu Size 7 (where she had a voice role). She later appeared in the web series Fingertip. In Super Deluxe, she played a transgender's wife opposite Vijay Sethupathi. Kirubakaran Purushothaman of India Today was appreciative of her performance and expressions. In 2021, she had a special dance appearance in Tughlaq Durbar.

The year 2022 marked a turning point in her career with several successful films. She first played a secret agent's wife in Vikram opposite Fahadh Faasil. The film emerged as one of the highest-grossing Tamil film of all time. Her long delayed film Maamanithan was released in the same year. Gayathrie then expanded to Malayalam films with Nna Thaan Case Kodu, playing a reformed thief's lover opposite Kunchacko Boban. Jose K George of The Week noted, "Gayathrie is praiseworthy. Although she does not have much to do in the first two acts, she has quite a few interesting lines in the third act, and the actor pulls it off with much self-assurance." The film was a box office success and won her the SIIMA Award for Best Female Debut – Malayalam. Her last release that year was Udanpaal.

In 2023, Gayathrie appeared in Bagheera opposite Prabhudeva, and in the Malayalam film Corona Papers opposite Shane Nigam. In the same year, she played a young terrorist in the Hindi series Jaanbaaz Hindustan Ke. Ganesh Aaglave of Firstpost noted, "Gayathrie as Tasleena will make you hate her portrayal with her impeccable act." In 2024, Gayathire first appeared in a cameo as a singer in the Hindi-Tamil bilingual Merry Christmas. She then played the lead in Pechi. Abhinav Subramanian of The Times of India stated that she "excels" in her well-written role.

== Filmography ==
=== Films ===
- All films are in Tamil unless otherwise noted.

List of Gayathrie film credits
Year	Title	Role	Notes	Ref.
2012	18 Vayasu	Gayathri		
2012	Naduvula Konjam Pakkatha Kaanom	Dhanalakshmi "Dhana"		
2013	Ponmaalai Pozhudhu	Divya		
2013	Mathapoo	Pooja		
2014	Rummy	Meenakshi		
2017	Puriyadha Pudhir	Meera		
2018	Titanic Kadhalum Kavundhu Pogum	Unknown	Unreleased film	
2018	Oru Nalla Naal Paathu Solren	Godavari		
2018	Seethakaathi	Herself		
2019	Chithiram Pesuthadi 2	Priya		
2019	Super Deluxe	Jyothi Manickam		
2019	K-13	Pavithra		
2019	Oththa Seruppu	Usha	Voice only	
2021	Tughlaq Durbar	Herself	Cameo appearance in song "Arasial Kedi"	
2022	Vikram	Gayathri Amar		
2022	Maamanithan	Savithri Radhakrishnan		
2022	Nna Thaan Case Kodu	Devi Kozhummal	Malayalam film	
2022	Udanpaal	Kanmani		
2023	Bagheera	Pallavi		
2023	Corona Papers	Veena	Malayalam film	
2024	Merry Christmas	Singer	Cameo appearance; simultaneously shot in Hindi	
2024	Pechi	Meena		
2025	DNA	Dancer	Cameo appearance in the song "Maaya Theera"	
2025	Kaayal	Thenmozhi "Thenu"		
2025	Kaantha	Devi TK Mahadevan		

=== Web series ===
List of Gayathrie web series credits
Year	Title	Role	Notes	Ref.
2018	Vella Raja	Aadhira		
2019	Fingertip	Sandhya	Season 1	
2021	I Hate You I Love You: Chapter-1 : Alarm	Mrs.Rahul		
2022	Srikanto	Ritu	Bengali series; cameo appearance	
2023	Jaanbaaz Hindustan Ke	Thasleena	Hindi series	

== Awards and nominations ==
List of Gayathrie awards
Year	Award	Category	Film	Result	Ref.
2023	South Indian International Movie Awards	Best Female Debut – Malayalam	Nna Thaan Case Kodu	Won	
