= S. S. Chakravarthy =

Indian film director (died 2023)

S. Shajahan Chakravarthy (died 29 April 2023) was an Indian film producer in Tamil cinema. He produced a number of Tamil films through his production company, NIC Arts. Most of his films starred Ajith Kumar. His son Johnny debuted as an actor in Renigunta, which he produced, along with Johnny's subsequent film, 18 Vayasu. Chakravarthy also has a daughter, Shakeel Nila Chakravarthy.

== Death ==
Chakravarthy died on 29 April 2023.

== Filmography ==
=== Producer ===
Year	Film	Notes
1997	Raasi	
1999	Vaalee	
2000	Mugavaree	
2001	Citizen	
2002	Red	
2002	Villain	
2003	Kadhal Sadugudu	
2003	Anjaneya	
2005	Ji	
2006	Varalaru	
2008	Kaalai	
2009	Renigunta	Distributor
2012	18 Vayasu	
2015	Vaalu	

=== Actor ===
- Vilangu (2022) (Series)
