= Rajavin Parvaiyile =

- Poster
- Directed by: Janaki Soundar
- Written by: Janaki Soundar
- Produced by: S. Soundara Pandian
- Starring: Vijay; Indraja; Ajith Kumar; Gayathri Sasthiri
- Cinematography: Loganathan Prasad
- Edited by: M. N. Raja
- Music by: Ilaiyaraaja
- Production company: Sri Masani Amman Movies
- Release date: 5 August 1995
- Running time: 140 minutes
- Country: India
- Language: Tamil
- Budget: ₹20 lakh
- Box office: ₹1.90 crore

Rajavin Parvaiyile (transl. In Raja's Sight) is a 1995 Indian Tamil-language romantic drama film, directed by Janaki Soundar (in his directorial debut). starring Vijay and Indraja, with Ajith Kumar in a flashback appearance. The film revolves around Gowri, a rich man's daughter in the village, who falls for Raja, an ambitious college going guy with a poor family background. When Raja continues to avoid Gowri, she begins to investigate why he is not interested in her.

Rajavin Parvaiyile was released on 5 August 1995.

== Plot ==
Gowri returns to her native village, Thulasipatti, to visit her paternal uncle Pannaiyar, a wealthy landlord. Raja, a poor farm laborer, lives in the same village and is focused on studying to secure a good job. During their first encounter, Raja comically answers a riddle, which Gowri misinterprets as an insult. In response, Gowri's aunt sends goons to attack Raja, but he successfully defends himself. Despite the misunderstanding, Raja apologizes to Pannaiyar, and Gowri begins to appreciate his genuineness. She tries to befriend Raja, but he keeps his distance, uninterested in her advances. Meanwhile, Gowri befriends Raja's mother Rasamma, who works on Pannaiyar's farm. At a village festival, Raja rescues Gowri's friend Shenbagam from goons, which deepens Gowri's love for Raja. However, Raja remains aloof, refusing to believe in love due to a painful past experience.

Raja's past reveals a tragic love story between his best friend Chandru and a woman named Shanthi. Raja had helped Chandru meet Shanthi, but her father disapproved of their love. In Chandu's absence, her father gently talked her out of Chandu's love and arranged for Shanthi to marry another man. Shanthi readily agreed without informing Chandru. After Shanthi's marriage, heartbroken, Chandru took his own life, and this experience made Raja cynical about love, causing him to push Gowri away. A few years later, Raja saw Shanthi along with her daughter (born to her husband). Her daughter behaves too immaturely for her age. Despite Gowri's efforts, Raja remains determined to avoid romantic entanglements. Gowri, having failed to win Raja's heart, decides to leave the village. Before departing, she visits Raja's house to return a book, where an accidental incident leaves her with minor burns on her legs. Overcome with guilt, Raja apologizes, and Gowri confesses her love, finally winning him over. However, their love faces opposition from Gowri's aunt, who refuses to accept Raja due to his lower social status. Gowri's urgent departure to meet her father Rajasekaran raises concerns that she might be forced into an arranged marriage, similar to Shanthi's past. Gowri's aunt further complicates matters by berating Rasamma for raising a son who dares to love a rich girl like Gowri.

Rasamma, fearing for their safety, pleads with Raja to renounce his love. As Raja feared, Rajasekaran arranges for Gowri's marriage to someone else. Gowri rushes back to the village, seeking Pannaiyar's help. Despite his wife's resistance, Pannaiyar takes Gowri to Raja's house. Rasamma, still apprehensive about Rajasekaran's wrath, reluctantly accepts Gowri as Raja's partner. However, Rajasekaran arrives, determined to find his daughter. He beats Rasamma, but Raja intervenes, fighting off the goons. Rajasekaran also humiliates Pannaiyar and his wife, taunting them about their childlessness. This sparks a change of heart in Pannaiyar's wife. Rajasekaran further escalates the situation by burning Raja's hut, where Gowri rushes in to save a photograph of Raja, and Raja follows to rescue her. This heroic act brings about a transformation in Rajasekaran, who finally apologizes to his brother and sister-in-law, accepting Gowri's love for Raja. With the obstacles removed, Gowri and Raja finally unite.

== Cast ==
- Vijay as Raja
- Indraja as Gowri
- Ajith Kumar as Chandru, Raja's friend
- Gayathri Sasthiri as Shanthi
- Vadivukkarasi as Rasamma, Raja's mother
- Janagaraj as Thulasipatti Pannaiyar, Gowri's uncle
- Sathyapriya as Pannaiyar's wife/Gowri's aunt
- Mohan Natarajan as Rajasekaran, Gowri's father
- Vennira Aadai Moorthy as School Headmaster
- Vadivelu as Arivazhagan
- Charuhasan as Shanthi's father
- Kumarimuthu as Kamalakannan
- Singamuthu as School Teacher
- Maghima Devi as School Teacher
- Balaguru

== Production ==
The film notably featured Vijay and Ajith Kumar together at an early stage of their careers in the mid-90s, with the pair later going on to become two leading Indian heroes working in the Tamil film industry. Till date, this is the only film where the two actors have shared the screen together.

== Soundtrack ==
The music was composed by Ilaiyaraaja. The audio rights were acquired by Pyramid music and Music Master Records.

Track listing
No.	Title	Lyrics	Singer(s)	Length
1.	"Oru Sudar Iru Sudar"	Vaali	Mano, S. Janaki	05:14
2.	"Amman Koyil Ellamae"	Muthulingam	Arunmozhi	05:12
3.	"Kottunga Kottunga"	Kamakodiyan	Chorus	05:40
4.	"Ammanuke Adanki"	Vaali	Vadivelu, Chorus	04:59
5.	"Ival Yaaro Vaanvittu"	Vaali	Arunmozhi, S. Janaki	05:16
Total length:				26:21

== Re-release ==
The film was re-released in Tamil Nadu theatres on 6 January 2023.
