= Raasi (film) =

- ராசி
- Directed by: Murali Abbas
- Written by: Murali Abbas
- Produced by: S. N. Raja
- Starring: Ajith Kumar; Rambha; Prakash Raj; Nagesh; Vadivelu
- Cinematography: P. Rajan
- Edited by: B. Lenin; V. T. Vijayan
- Music by: Sirpy
- Production company: Nic Arts
- Release date: 18 April 1997
- Running time: 145 minutes
- Country: India
- Language: Tamil

Raasi (Tamil: ராசி, lit. 'zodiac, luck') is a 1997 Indian Tamil-language romantic drama film directed by Murali Abbas (in his directorial debut) and produced by Nic Arts, the company's first feature. The film stars Ajith Kumar and Rambha with Prakash Raj and Vadivelu playing supporting roles. It was released on 18 April 1997.

== Plot ==
This film is about the family of Kumar and his Uncle (Rambha's father). The problem between the two families start when Kumar is unable to spend too much money for an occasion in his uncle's family. Whether Kumar and Meena get united after solving out all the problems forms the crux of the story.

== Cast ==
- Ajith Kumar as Kumar
- Rambha as Meena
- Prakash Raj as Melapatty Ramasamy's son
- Nagesh as Freedom fighter
- Vadivelu as Chidambaram
- Jayachitra as Rajalakshmi, Kumar's mother
- Bala Singh as Kathirvel, Meena's father
- Kavitha as Karpagam, Meena's mother
- Neena as Kavitha, Kumar's sister
- Sriman as Rathnavelu
- Pawan as Kumar's friend
- Kumarimuthu as Narikuravar
- Kullamani as Narikuravar
- Vaiyapuri as Narikuravar
- Pasi Sathya as Narikuravar
- Periya Karuppu Thevar as Periya Karuppu
- Sangeetha Balan
- Rajkanth

== Production ==
Raasi is the first film produced by S. S. Chakravarthy's NIC Arts. Shilpa Shetty was initially approached to play the leading female role but her unavailability led to the producers selecting Rambha.

== Soundtrack ==
Music was composed by Sirpy, with lyrics by Palani Bharathi.

Track List
No.	Title	Singer(s)	Length
1.	"Yenadi Yenadi"	Mano, Swarnalatha	4:19
2.	"Ennai Thedatho"	K. S. Chithra	5:02
3.	"Kadhalin Desam"	Mano, Swarnalatha	5:44
4.	"Poomalai"	Hariharan	5:00
5.	"Thendral"	P. Unnikrishnan, K. S. Chithra	5:05
6.	"Ennachu Thangachi"	Mano, P. Unnikrishnan, Febi Mani	4:38
Total length:			29:48

== Reception ==
R. P. R. of Kalki praised Ajith's natural performance, called Rambha's glamour as highlight but felt Sirpy's music lack originality and added many scenes after interval are so lengthy and the director struggled to move the plot forward and concluded saying its our raasi (luck) to see a full-length surgery.
