= Villain (2002 film) =

- Theatrical release poster
- Directed by: K. S. Ravikumar
- Screenplay by: K. S. Ravikumar
- Story by: Yugi Sethu
- Produced by: S. S. Chakravarthy
- Starring: Ajith Kumar; Meena; Kiran Rathod
- Cinematography: Ashok Rajan; S. Moorthy
- Edited by: K. Thanigachalam
- Music by: Vidyasagar
- Production company: NIC Arts
- Release date: 4 November 2002
- Running time: 164 minutes
- Country: India
- Language: Tamil

Villain is a 2002 Indian Tamil-language heist action comedy film directed by K. S. Ravikumar and produced by S. S. Chakravarthy. The film stars Ajith Kumar in the main dual lead role alongside Meena and Kiran Rathod. Vidyasagar composed the score and soundtrack for the film.

Villain was released on 4 November 2002 and became a blockbuster. Ajith won his second Filmfare Award for Best Actor – Tamil. The film was remade by Ravikumar in Telugu with the same name in 2003.

== Plot ==
Shiva and Vishnu are identical twins. Shiva, the elder one, is a bus conductor, while Vishnu, the younger one, has a mild intellectual disability. During their childhood, Shiva overhears his parents' plot to send Vishnu to an unknown orphanage and to hide this information from him. To save his brother Vishnu, Shiva runs away to another city with him and strives hard to look after him. A 'dada' Sundaramoorthy, who runs a beggar trade, beats Vishnu brutally, and Vishnu becomes disabled for life. Shiva leaves Vishnu in a home run by a social worker Lalitha.

During the day, Shiva works as a bus conductor, and at the same time, poses as Vishnu: to play Robin Hood and steal from the rich and corrupt. A gang including Thangam, Mani, and others assist him in these operations. He is never suspected, and so, with the stolen money, he takes care of not only Vishnu, but also 800 people in other institutions for the physically disabled. A college student Lavanya falls in love with Shiva, but he later learns that she is Sundaramoorthy's sister-in-law. Matters worsen when Sundaramoorthy becomes the chairman of the institute for the physically disabled. How Shiva deals with the situation forms the rest of the story.

During the film, Thangam is secretly in love with Shiva, though he does not know this. Later, she gives up her love and lets Lavanya marry Shiva. At last, Shiva marries Lavanya and Thangam marries Vishnu. The brothers live happily ever after.

== Cast ==
- Ajith Kumar in a dual role as
  - Shiva
    - Dinesh Sha as young Shiva
  - Vishnu
    - Naresh Sha as young Vishnu
- Meena as Thangam
- Kiran Rathod as Lavanya
- Sujatha as Lalitha Subramaniam
- Ramesh Khanna as Mani, Shiva's friend
- Karunas as Nochikuppam Dampudi
- Vijayakumar as ACP
- FEFSI Vijayan as Sundaramoorthy
- Nizhalgal Ravi as Shiva's and Vishnu's father
- Pyramid Natarajan as Minister
- Manobala as Pyramid Natarajan's brother-in-law
- Rekha as Rajalakshmi, Lavanya's sister and Sundaramoorthy's wife
- Santhana Bharathi as Father Karunakaran
- Crane Manohar as Shiva's friend
- Vasu Vikram as Shiva's friend
- Pandu as a police officer
- Bayilvan Ranganathan as a police officer
- Madhan Bob as Sundaramoorthy's assistant
- Lavanya as Thangam's friend
- Bhupinder Singh as a man with heroin
- Vinu Chakravarthy as Minister
- Priyanka as Lavanya's friend
- R. S. Shivaji as Pyramid Natarajan's House Security
- R. Sundarrajan as Minister's related
- Besant Ravi as Henchman
- Anu Mohan as Emcee
- Citizen Mani as Bus passenger
- Scissor Manohar as Police officer
- Kanal Kannan in a special appearance as a henchman
- K. S. Ravikumar in the end of the film as a man requesting a photo
- Vasanthi in a special appearance in "Adicha Nethi Adi"

== Production ==
The film saw the first collaboration of Ajith Kumar and K. S. Ravikumar. The shooting of the film was completed in 39 days.

== Soundtrack ==
The soundtrack was composed by Vidyasagar and lyrics were written by Vairamuthu.

Track listing
No.	Title	Singer(s)	Length
1.	"Pathinettu Vayathil"	Udit Narayan, Sadhana Sargam	5:22
2.	"Orae Manam"	Hariharan, Chandana Bala	4:45
3.	"Adicha Nethi Adi"	Karthik, Swarnalatha	5:25
4.	"Aadiyil Kaathadicha"	S. P. Balasubrahmanyam	1:32
5.	"Hello Hello"	Sadhana Sargam, Anuradha Sriram, Tippu, Clinton Cerejo	5:04
6.	"Thappu Thanda"	Shankar Mahadevan, Sujatha Mohan	4:44
7.	"Aadiyil Kaathadicha" (sad)	S. P. Balasubrahmanyam	1:41
Total length:			28:31

== Release and reception ==
Villain was released in Diwali on 4 November 2002. Malathi Rangarajan of The Hindu claimed that "if you don't rack your brains about the feasibility of the hero's game plans, you could enjoy watching "Villain"" and that "Ajit scores on both fronts". Malini Mannath of Chennai Online wrote "'Villain' is a film that would satisfy Ajit's fans, and after a series of flops it is a well deserved success for the handsome actor". K. N. Vijiyan of New Straits Times wrote, "Villan seems aimed specifically to please Ajith's and Kiran's fans. If you are one of their fans, you will probably enjoy this film. However, the film would have been a lot better minus some songs which really test our patience". Indiainfo wrote "Slick photography by Ashok-Murthy and trendy music by Vidyasagar makes this other than mediocre film watchable. Ajith's acting is okay. Kiran looks glamorous. Meena's role is tacky. In a bid to appease everyone — youth, women and mass — director K. S. Ravikumar missed the line. He should have been taken more care over script. A watchable film for the sheer sake of songs and sexy Kiran".

Cinesouth wrote "10 years ago 'Gentleman' happened. Twist the story around a bit and serve it in a new bottle, and, there it is- 'Villain' from director KS Ravikumar (Story: Yugi Sethu). It's all the magic of screenplay. In the depths of the story lies the engrossing flashbacks of Ajith's life. With those extremely poignant scenes the director had moved the film ahead". C. Shivakumar of Deccan Herald wrote "It is just another average film with the usual ingredients of romance, violence and some ordinary music. Director K S Ravikumar, who is working for the first time with Ajith, has overdone the dramatisation of the lead character. The narration is interspersed with some flashback scenes but lacks the punch when it comes to picturisation of the songs". Ajith's dual role performance earned him his second Filmfare Award for Best Actor – Tamil.
