= Renigunta (film) =

- Poster
- Directed by: R. Panneerselvam
- Written by: Singampuli (Dialogues)
- Screenplay by: R. Panneerselvam
- Story by: R. Panneerselvam
- Produced by: S. Mahendra Kumar Jain
- Starring: Johnny; Sanusha
- Cinematography: Shakthi
- Edited by: Anthony
- Music by: Ganesh Raghavendra
- Production company: Film Fabricators
- Distributed by: Nic Arts
- Release date: 4 December 2009
- Country: India
- Language: Tamil

Renigunta is a 2009 Indian Tamil-language action film written and directed by R. Panneerselvam. The film stars Johnny and Sanusha, while Nishanth, Theepetti Ganesan, Thamizh, and Sandeep play supporting roles. The music was composed by Ganesh Raghavendra with cinematography by Shakthi and editing by Anthony. The film released on 4 December 2009 and was a sleeper hit.

The film takes its name from a suburb in Tirupati, Andhra Pradesh where part of the story takes place. It speaks about juvenile delinquents and explores some of the reasons that instigate them to commit crime. It was dubbed into Telugu and released in Andhra Pradesh in 2012. The film was remade in Kannada as Mandya to Mumbai (2016). An Standalone sequel titled Renigunta 2 is scheduled to release on 2026.

== Plot ==
The movie begins in Madurai where a young boy, Sakthi (Johnny), leads a happy life with his parents. His life changes when his parents are murdered by an antisocial. As Sakthi seeks revenge, he is arrested and sent to prison, where the guards severely beat him. While in jail, he is befriended by four young criminals: Pandurangan aka Pandu (Nishanth), Prem Kumar aka Dabba (Theepetti Ganesan), Mari (Thamizh), and Michael (Sandeep). When these hardcore criminals break loose from prison, Sakthi follows them, and they help him take revenge on his parents' killers. They take a train to Mumbai, where they plan to become big gangsters. However, fate has other plans. The men land at Renigunta in Tirupati, where they come across Bunker (Bunker), who acts as a mediator between contract killers and clients.

Through Bunker, the boys get acquainted with Sardar, an influential don who takes them seriously after a successful murder in the town. Meanwhile, Sakthi comes across a mute girl (Sanusha) in the neighbourhood. After a few encounters, romance blossoms between them, but the girl's uncle plans to push her into the flesh trade. Taking pity on Sakthi and the girl, his friends decide to help them elope, but only after they complete a final murder for Sardar.

Unfortunately, all plans go haywire when they execute their murder plans. Pandu is killed at the scene, and later Sakthi and Mari blame Sardar and Bunker for abandoning their friend. A fight breaks out, and Mari is killed before Sakthi kills both Sardar and Bunker. Sakthi reunites with Dabba and Michael, but the police are now chasing them. Sakthi sends a message to his girlfriend, telling her to meet him at a train station so they can elope together. While she is waiting for him there, the police finally find the three boys. Michael and Dabba are killed, while Sakthi escapes by running and hiding in a train. As the train starts moving, Sakthi believes that no one can get hold of him, and he leans out of the train door, dreaming of his girlfriend. However, as the train reaches a station, he is shot dead by Police Inspector Radhakrishnan. The film ends with the mute girl waiting for Sakthi at a railway station down the line.

== Cast ==
- Johnny as Sakthi
- Sanusha as the unnamed mute girl
- Nishanth as Pandurangan
- Sandeep as Michael
- Theepetti Ganesan as Prem Kumar (Dabba)
- Tamizh as Mari
- S. Elango as Sethupathi, Sakthi's father
- Bunker as Bunker
- Captain Ganesh as Sardar
- Billy Murali
- Rojapathi
- Nandha Saravanan as Tirumala Inspector Radhakrishnan
- Jasper as Renigunta investigative officer
- Sujatha Sivakumar as Deivanai, Sakthi's mother
- Sanjana Singh as the unnamed mute girl's elder sister
- Juliet
- Risha as the item girl in the song "Gandharvanin Kottai"

== Production ==
The film marked the directorial debut of Panneerselvam who earlier worked as assistant director to N. Lingusamy. Kumbakonam Railway station was shown as Renigunda railway station with Telugu signboards for the film.

== Soundtrack ==
The soundtrack was composed by Ganesh Raghavendra with lyrics written by Piraisoodan, Yugabharathi, and Na. Muthukumar.

Track list
No.	Title	Lyrics	Singer(s)	Length
1.	"Tallakulam"	Na. Muthukumar	Silambarasan
2.	"Mazhai Peiyum"	Yugabharathi	Harish Raghavendra
3.	"Vizhigalile"	Yugabharathi	Bombay Jayashri
4.	"Vaazhkai"	Na. Muthukumar	Vijay Yesudas
5.	"Gandharvanin"	Piraisoodan	Ranjitha

== Critical reception ==
Pavithra Srinivasan of Rediff.com wrote, "It's clear that Panneerselvam has been heavily influenced by new-age gangster flicks and rural movies [..] If only he'd actually made way for a cast iron plot, this one would have fared better." Sify wrote, "On the whole the film drags big time post interval and is too long at 2 hours, 35 minutes. The songs act as speed breakers and some scenes are repeated, especially the gory killings. The film is dark and disturbing." Malathi Rangarajan of The Hindu wrote, "Renigunta has everything to make it tick. If only they had kept violence under control …". Reviewing the Telugu version, Nandhu Sundaram wrote for The Times of India, "Technical departments, as always in Tamil cinema do better than their so-called creative counterparts. But the weak storyline and shoddy acting make the movie insipid, ennui-inducing affair".

A critic from Dinamalar wrote that overall apart from a few cinematic flaws, Renigunta is at the forefront of everything including good acting, casting, music, cinematography, editing, story, screenplay and direction. A critic from Ananda Vikatan wrote that debut director Paneerselvam has beautifully depicited the aimless lives and the brazen courage of young criminals. The critic added that the director's talent is evident in creating each character with uniqueness. A critic from Kumudam called the film "O.K".
