= Ajith Kumar =

Indian actor and racing driver (born 1971)

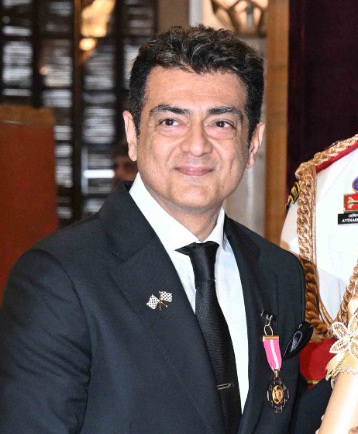
- Ajith in 2025
- Born: Ajith Kumar Subramaniam; 1 May 1971 (age 55); Secunderabad, Andhra Pradesh, India (present-day Telangana)
- Occupations: Actor; Racing driver
- Years active: 1990–present
- Organization: Ajith Kumar Racing
- Categorisation: FIA Bronze
- Works: Filmography
- Spouse: Shalini (m. 2000)
- Children: 2
- Awards: Full list
- Honours: Kalaimamani (2000); Padma Bhushan (2025)

Ajith Kumar Subramaniam (born 1 May 1971) is an Indian actor who works predominantly in Tamil cinema. To date, he has starred in over 63 films, and won four Vijay Awards, three Cinema Express Awards, three Filmfare Awards South and three Tamil Nadu State Film Awards. In addition to his acting career, Ajith is an occasional racing driver and participated in the MRF Racing series (2010) and having competed in circuits around India in places such as Mumbai, Chennai and Delhi. He is one among very few Indians to race in the international arena and in Formula championships. Based on the annual earnings of Indian celebrities, he was included in the Forbes India Celebrity 100 list three times.

Kumar began his career with a small role in the 1990 Tamil romantic drama En Veedu En Kanavar. After his success in Rajavin Parvaiyile, his first major breakthrough was Aasai (1995), Ajith established himself as a romantic hero with Kadhal Kottai (1996), Kaadhal Mannan (1998) and Aval Varuvala (1998), and established himself as an action hero starting with the film Amarkkalam (1999). Kumar's dual portrayal of twin brothers—where one is deaf-mute—in S. J. Suryah's Vaalee (1999) won him his first Filmfare Award for Best Actor – Tamil. He earned critical acclaim for his dual roles in the vigilante film Citizen (2001). He was also praised for his dual role performance in K. S. Ravikumar’s Villain (2002) where he won his second Filmfare Award for Best Actor - Tamil. In 2006, he starred in K. S. Ravikumar's Varalaru, in which he played three roles including one of a classical Bharatanatyam dancer. It became the highest-grossing Tamil film of 2006, and earned him another Filmfare Award for Best Actor – Tamil. The following year, he starred in two remakes—Kireedam (2007) and Billa (2007), (Note: Kireedam was a remake of the namesake 1989 Malayalam film while Billa was a remake of the 1980 Tamil film of the same name.) both of which earned him critical acclaim. Kumar played an antagonist in his 50th film Mankatha (2011), which became one of the highest-grossing Tamil films of all time. His next release, Billa II (2012), was Tamil cinema's first prequel. (Note: The film was a prequel to his 2007 film of the same name.)

Kumar has also been abroad for various races, including Germany and Malaysia. He drove in the 2003 Formula Asia BMW Championships. He raced in the 2010 Formula 2 Championship along with two Indians, Armaan Ebrahim and Parthiva Sureshwaren. In 2025, Government of India honoured him with Padma Bhushan, the nation's third highest civilian honour.

== Early life ==
Ajith Kumar was born on 1 May 1971 in Secunderabad, present-day Telangana, India. His father, P. Subramaniam (died 2023), was from a Tamil Palakkad Iyer family from Kerala and his mother, Mohini (died 2026), was a Sindhi from Kolkata, West Bengal. Ajith was the middle son out of three brothers, one of his other brothers is Anil Kumar, an IIT Madras graduate-turned-entrepreneur, and the other one is Anup Kumar.

Kumar dropped out of Asan Memorial Senior Secondary School during his tenth grade, before he had completed his higher secondary schooling. Through a family friend who worked with the Enfield company, Kumar was able to get a job as an apprentice and spent six months training to be a mechanic. He later quit the role at the insistence of his father, who wanted Kumar to have a white-collar job, and joined another family friend's garment exporting company as an apprentice. He eventually progressed to become a business developer and regularly travelled throughout the country on sales assignments, improving his English-speaking skills. After resigning from the role, Kumar set up a textiles business distributing fabric alongside three other partners. The business venture underperformed prompting Kumar to take up another job in the garments industry. During the period, Kumar also began working on modelling assignments alongside his work. He was notably scouted by P. C. Sreeram during the making of a commercial for Hercules Cycle and Motor Company, who felt he had the appearance to become an actor.

== Acting career ==
=== 1990–1998 ===
Kumar began his acting career through a one-scene appearance as a school child in En Veedu En Kanavar (1990). Through the recommendation of S. P. Balasubrahmanyam, whose son, S. P. Charan, was a classmate of his, he was cast in his first lead role in the Telugu romantic drama Prema Pusthakam (1993), which remains his only Telugu film to date. However, the shoot of the film was stalled soon after production began, following the death of the film's director, Gollapudi Srinivas. As a result, his first major theatrical release was the Tamil romantic drama Amaravathy (1993), which Kumar had signed after being recommended to director Selvaa by Balasubrahmanyam, who had seen parts of Prema Pusthakam prior to its delay. As the film went into post-production, Kumar was bed-ridden due to a racing injury while training for an amateur motor race. He underwent three major surgeries resulting in bed rest for one and a half years. As a result, his voice in the film was dubbed by actor Vikram. Following the injury, Kumar was keen to make up for lost time and signed on to play supporting roles. In the following years, he played character roles in the Arvind Swami-starrer Paasamalargal (1994) and Vijay-starrer Rajavin Parvaiyile (1995). He was also seen in the family drama Pavithra (1994), which featured him as an ailing patient shown maternal affection by Radhika's character.

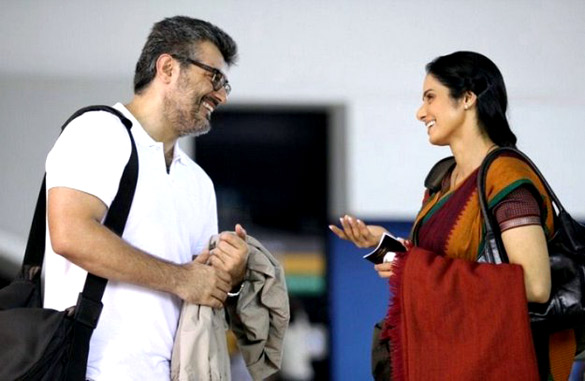
Ajith and actress Sridevi on the set of English Vinglish (2012)

Kumar's first commercially successful film as a lead actor was the romantic thriller Aasai (1995). The film, directed by Vasanth and produced by Mani Ratnam featured him in the lead role opposite Suvalakshmi, whose brother-in-law lusts for her. It performed well at the box office and established Kumar as an upcoming actor in the Tamil film industry. Aasai also earned him his first nomination for the Filmfare Award for Best Actor – Tamil. He later played a college student in Kalloori Vaasal, co-starring Prashanth and Pooja Bhatt. Kumar's second successful film came in the form of National Award winning Kadhal Kottai, in which Kumar reunited with Agathiyan, the director of the earlier project Vaanmathi. The film paired him opposite Devayani, with Heera Rajgopal playing a supporting role.

In 1997, Kumar appeared in five consecutive failures. During the same period, he had entered into the film distribution business and had experienced losses as a result. Describing the period as a "cruel time", Kumar also continued to have chronic back injuries and several of his other film commitments had become delayed. A notable project among the five films was Amitabh Bachchan's Tamil production Ullaasam (1997), in which he was paid a high salary of ₹2 million (equivalent to ₹12 million or US$130,000 in 2026) for the first time.

Kumar returned in 1998 with another big, successful project in Saran's Kaadhal Mannan, an action romantic comedy, setting the foundation for an expanding fan base. He also began acting in Vasanth's Nerukku Ner, and was later replaced by debutant Suriya. Kumar's next films Aval Varuvala and Unnidathil Ennai Koduthen also became successes, with the former pairing him with Simran for the first time and the latter featuring him in a guest role alongside Karthik. Except for Uyirodu Uyiraga, which performed poorly, his other three films released in 1998 were successful hits.

=== 1999–2008 ===
Kumar started 1999 with Ramesh Khanna's Thodarum and Sundar C's romantic drama Unnaithedi opposite Malavika. S. J. Suryah's thriller Vaalee, which portrayed Kumar in a dual role for the first time in his career, became one of his biggest hits at that time. The film told the story of a deaf-mute brother setting his eyes on his younger brother's wife, with Kumar's portrayal of the two brothers winning him his first Filmfare Award for Best Actor – Tamil. Furthermore, Ajith's portrayal of the brothers was also praised, with critics claiming that the film was an "instant classic", with Kumar showing that he is a "talented actor". The two following roles in the drama films Anandha Poongatre and Nee Varuvai Ena also brought Kumar plaudits for his portrayals, with the latter film featuring him in a guest role alongside Parthiban. His 25th and final film before the new millennium was Amarkkalam, directed by Saran and featuring Shalini, whom he married shortly after the film. Amarkkalam told the story of a neglected child who grew up and failed to show feelings of love and affection, becoming a gangster in the process, with Kumar's depiction of his rogue character appreciated by critics.

His first film of the new millennium, Mugavaree, won him commercial and critical praise. The film revolved around the life of a struggling music composer who faces sacrifices to proceed in his career. The film featured dual endings, one with Kumar succeeding in his career, the other with Kumar dejected. Kumar's performance was yet again praised with critics from Rediff, claiming that "Ajith is the real winner", drawing an allusion with the film's script, whilst adding that "it is amazing to see how Ajith has grown as an actor. He brilliantly portrays the vulnerable and sad Sridhar". He also appeared in A. R. Rahman's 2000 multi-starrer Kandukondain Kandukondain, directed by Rajiv Menon. The film featured Kumar alongside prominent actors Mammooty and Abbas and actresses Tabu and Aishwarya Rai. In a similar role to his previous film, Kumar played a struggling film director facing an oscillating relationship with Tabu, with the pair being unanimously praised for their roles. After giving six straight hits in 1999, and having had Mugavaree and Kandukondain Kandukondain in 2000 as successes, Kumar had an unsuccessful film, Unnai Kodu Ennai Tharuven, co-starring Simran.

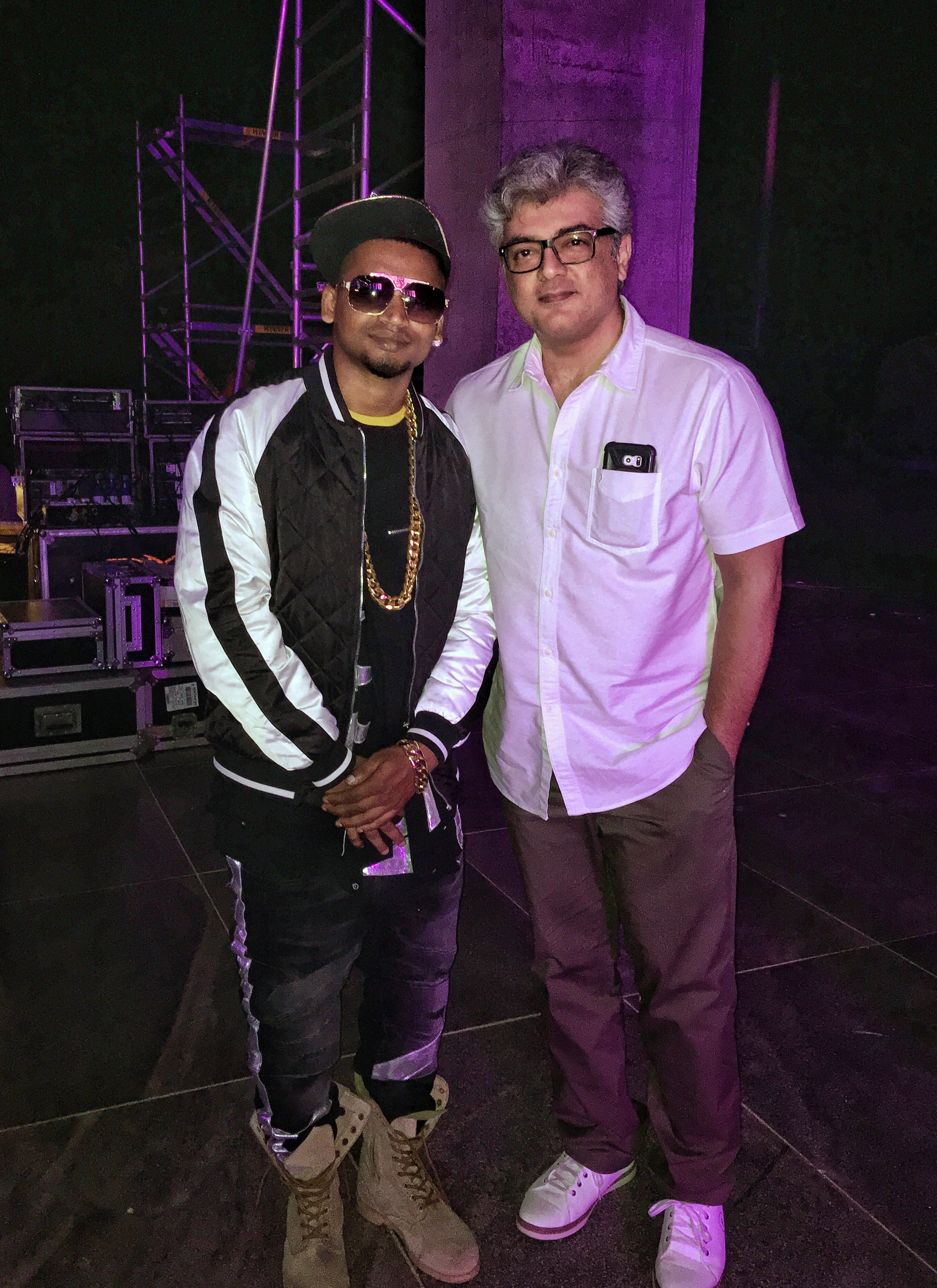
Ajith at Nerkonda Paarvai movie location

In 2001, Kumar appeared in three commercially successful films. Dheena, co-starring Laila and Suresh Gopi, released at Pongal and marked the beginning of a new image of Kumar as an action hero who would appeal to the masses. He earned the nickname, "Thala" (Leader), from this film. In the same year, he was offered a role in Nandhaa, which he rejected and was later replaced by Suriya, the eldest son of actor Sivakumar. His next was the much-hyped thriller Citizen, portraying him in ten get-ups and it became a commercial success at the box office. A role in the family drama Poovellam Un Vasam followed opposite Jyothika and was a critical and commercial success, earning him the Tamil Nadu State Film Special Award and his third nomination for the Filmfare Award for Best Actor – Tamil. The year ended off with a brief appearance in Santosh Sivan's Hindi project Asoka, in which Kumar played as one of the antagonist against Shah Rukh Khan, which did not perform well. In 2002, Kumar appeared in three films, the first two, Red and Raja being box office disappointments, the former further building up his image as an action hero. The third film Villain, directed by K. S. Ravikumar, portrayed Kumar in a dual role, one as a mentally disabled person and another as a caring brother. The film emerged as a commercial success and earned him his second Filmfare Award for Best Actor – Tamil.

From 2003 through 2005, Kumar appeared in fewer films due to his career in motor racing becoming more prominent. 2003 saw the release of his long-delayed Ennai Thalatta Varuvala and the police drama Anjaneya, both failing commercially. In that period, three successful films, namely Saamy, Kaakha Kaakha and Ghajini, were turned away by the actor due to various reasons.

His next film, Jana with Sneha, also became a big failure, with the Saran film Attagasam, being his only hit in the period. The film saw Kumar portray a dual role, with a song "Thala Deepavali", penned to promote his action image. In 2005, the failure of the Linguswamy film Ji, despite garnering positive reviews and taking a strong opening, saw Kumar take a sabbatical from acting to re-work his image. Of the five films released between 2003 and 2005, his only box office hit was Attagasam.

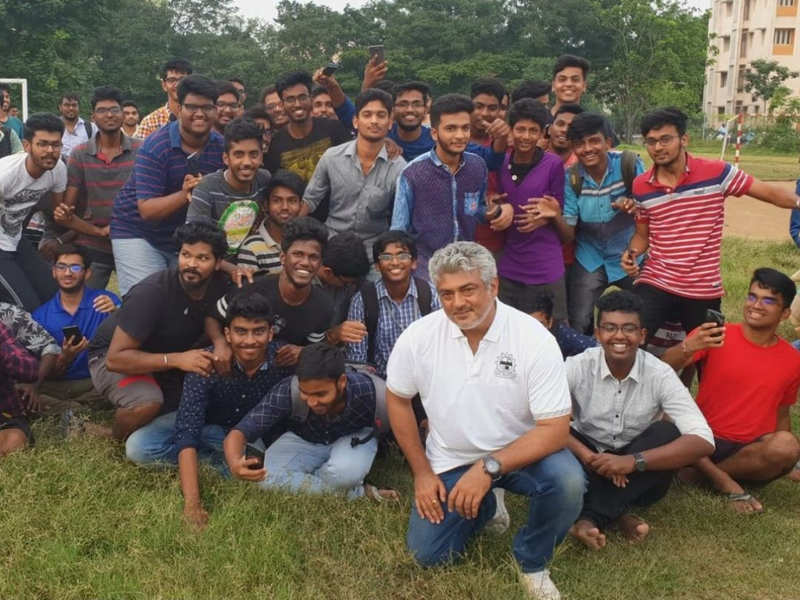
Ajith seen with MIT Students

During 2006, Kumar returned from his hiatus by appearing in P. Vasu's Paramasivan for which he had lost twenty kilograms to portray the lead role. The film enjoyed a moderate success, scoring over Vijay's Aathi, which also released in the same week, at the box office. Critics from The Hindu stated that Kumar looked "trim and taut" in the film with "only his eyes seeming to have lost some of its sparkle", following the major weight loss. Furthermore, for Paramasivan and his two other projects in 2006, Kumar sported long hair, which was being grown for Bala's project Naan Kadavul, which Ajith eventually opted out of. Similarly, his next film, AVM Productions's, Thirupathi, directed by Perarasu performed above average business at the box office, despite garnering poor reviews, with Rediff critics citing that the film is "anything but sensible", but that Kumar "salvages the situation with a spirited performance". Kumar summed up a successful comeback by the release of his long-delayed action drama Varalaru, which went on to become his third biggest success after Vaalee and Villain. The K. S. Ravikumar film co-starring Asin and Kanika, which was in production for nearly two years, portrayed Kumar in a triple role with one of them being a classical Bharatanatyam dancer, with his portrayal of his three roles being critically praised. Moreover, the film earned Kumar his third Filmfare Award for Best Actor – Tamil. In 2007, media reports hinted that the actor would do a project with Shankar. Ajith's first release in 2007, Aalwar, became a debacle at the box office, with his previous film still continuing to run in theatres even after Aalwar had stopped its brief theatrical run. Kireedam, a remake of the 1989 National Award-winning Malayalam film of the same name, was released to positive reviews, with the film also becoming a moderate success.

Kumar then starred in Billa, a remake of the 1980 Rajinikanth-starrer of the same name. The Vishnuvardhan-directorial fetched critical praise for Kumar, becoming a trend-setter for stylish art direction and cinematography in India. Billa, yet again, featured Ajith in a dual role, one of a notorious don whilst the other played an ordinary person who had to act as the don, following the former's death. Billa also earned him his sixth nomination for the Filmfare Award for Best Actor – Tamil. After Billa, Kumar appeared in the film, Ayngaran International's production Aegan, directed by choreographer Raju Sundaram. The film, a remake of the 2004 Hindi comedy Main Hoon Na, received mixed reviews and was a failure at the box office.

=== 2010–2019 ===
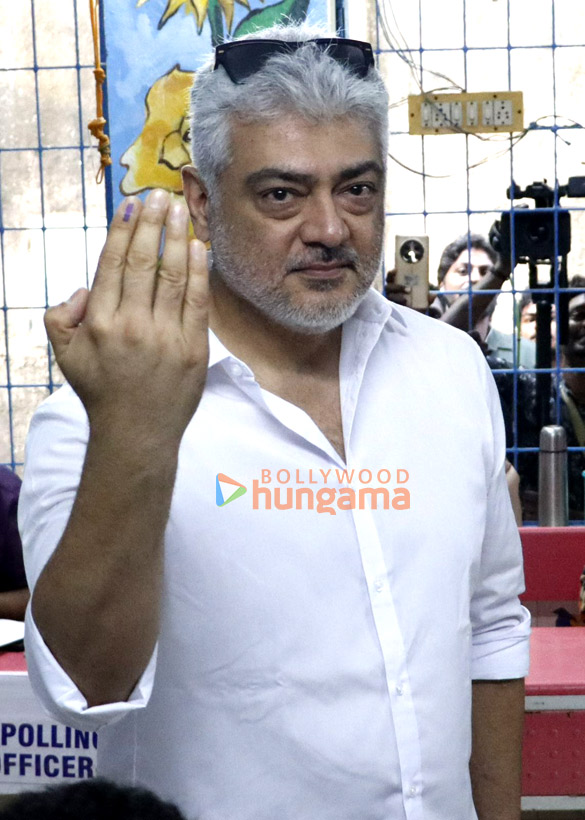
Ajith after voting for 2024 Indian general election

Following a year of production, Kumar's Aasal, released in February 2010, taking a grand opening at the box office. The film, which also featured Kumar in a dual role, also failed at the box office despite bigger expectations.

After a second foray into motor racing, Kumar signed a film directed by Venkat Prabhu, titled Mankatha, which notably became his 50th project. The film featured him in a full-length negative role as Vinayak Mahadevan, a suspended police officer with a lust for money. His performance and his decision to portray a character with negative shade, breaking the stereotype hero image in Tamil cinema, were lauded by critics, with reviewers from Sify and Rediff terming the film as an "out and out Ajith film" that worked "only because of Ajith". Heaping praise on the actor's performance, the former noted that he "rocks as the man with ice in his veins as the mean and diabolic cop" and that he played "the emotionless bad man, to perfection", while the latter wrote that practically "he carried the whole film on his capable shoulders". Mankatha emerged as a commercial success and earned him his seventh nomination for the Filmfare Award for Best Actor – Tamil.

Kumar then starred in Billa II, a sequel to his 2007 film Billa, which released on 13 July 2012. Reviewers appreciated Kumar's on-screen presence and stunts but blamed him for the choice of story and the director. Eventually, the film performed poorly at the box office. He starred in Vishnuvardhan's Arrambam, alongside Arya, Nayantara and Taapsee Pannu, which was released on 31 October, and earned positive reviews from both critics and audience. Arrambam earned him his eighth nomination for the Filmfare Award for Best Actor – Tamil. His next film was Veeram, directed by Siva and co-starring Tamannaah, which was released on Pongal 2014, which also earned positive reviews from critics. Ajith's next film was Yennai Arindhaal, with Gautham Vasudev Menon as director. Kumar's performance as a cop was widely praised with a critic calling it "Ajith's best since Kandukondain Kandukondain". Both Veeram and Yennai Arindhaal earned him his ninth and tenth nominations for the Filmfare Award for Best Actor – Tamil. Kumar worked with Siva again in Vedalam (2015), in which critics praised his performance. His latest project is Vivegam which received mixed-to-negative reviews with critics citing illogical scenes and average screenplay. His next release, Viswasam, was released on Pongal festival of 2019. Kumar later starred in Nerkonda Paarvai, remake of the Hindi film, Pink (2016), which was released in the same year.

=== 2022–present ===
In 2022, Kumar collaborated with Vinoth, again, for Valimai. It was written and directed by Vinoth. It released to mixed reviews from both the critics and audience, alike. The following year in 2023, they collaborated again for the bank heist thriller, Thunivu. It was produced by Boney Kapoor and it was the third collaboration of the team consisting of Ajith, Boney Kapoor, H. Vinoth, and Nirav Shah. Ghibran composed the music and background score for the film.

His 2025 films are Vidaamuyarchi directed by Magizh Thirumeni and Good Bad Ugly directed by Adhik Ravichandran.

In November 2026, Ajith Kumar’s 64th film, Daredevil, directed by Adhik Ravichandran, commenced production with a traditional pooja ceremony held in Chennai on 2 November 2026. The film marks Ajith’s second consecutive collaboration with Adhik Ravichandran following the blockbuster of Good Bad Ugly (2025). The ceremony was attended by producer Shalini Ajithkumar, Music Composer Anirudh Ravichander and cast members including Sreeleela, Unni Mukundan, R. Parthiban, Prabhu, Sunil and Redin Kingsley. Shalini Ajith Kumar who is producing the film under the banner of Bravehearts Production, gave the first clap. Ajith Kumar was unable to attend the ceremony due to his Car Racing commitments in Dubai, with his participation in the principal photography scheduled to begin on 12 November in Hyderabad.

== Accolades ==
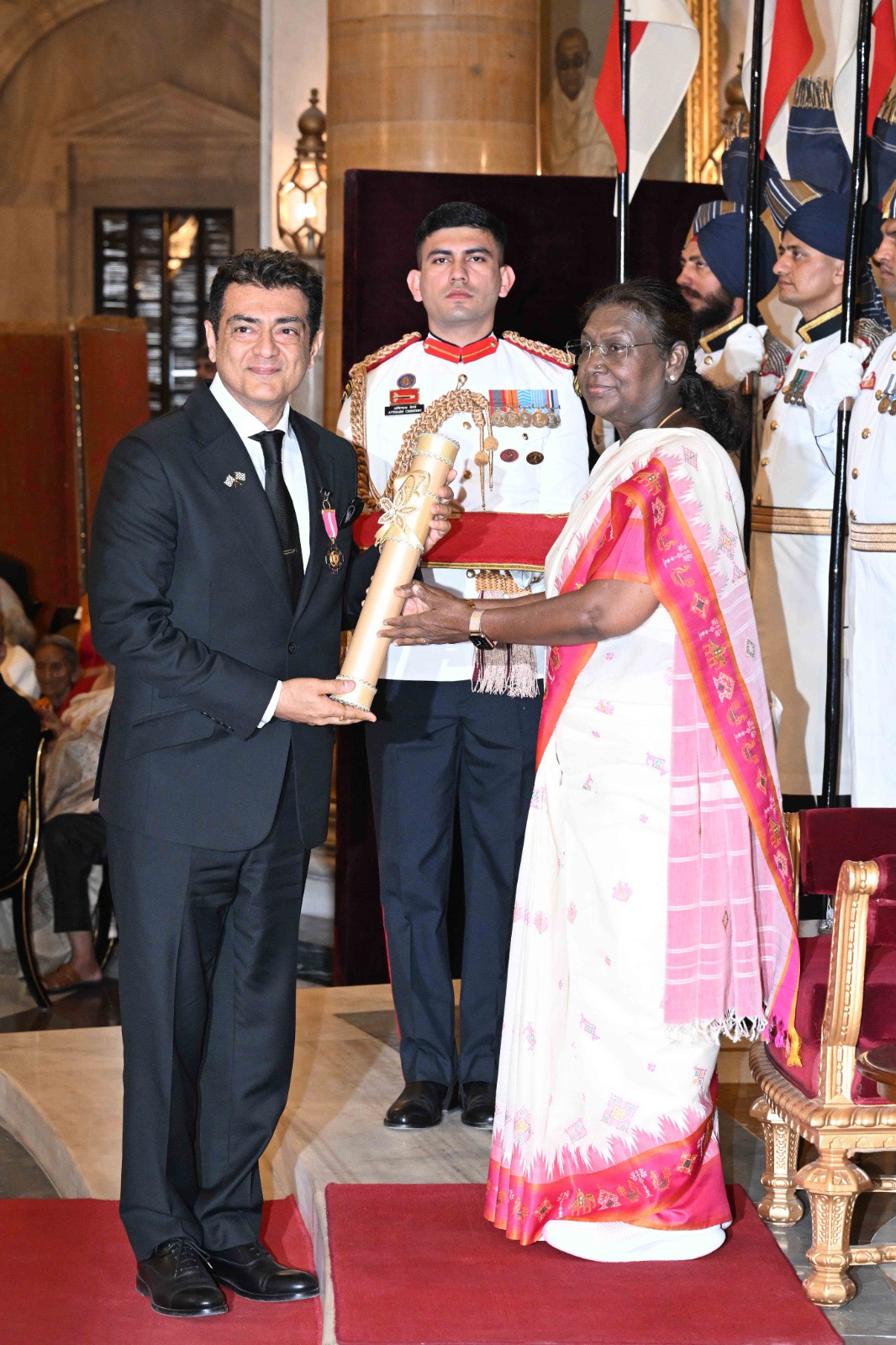
Ajith receiving Padma Bhushan in 2025

In recognition of his contributions to the Indian film industry, Ajith was honoured with the Padma Bhushan, India's third-highest civilian award, by the Government of India on 28 April 2025.

== Other works ==
In the late 1990s, Kumar began his own film distribution company called Circuit 9000. In 1998, he announced that he would close the business and refrain from producing, distributing or directing films in the future.

Kumar created the non-profit organisation Mohini-Mani Foundation, named after his parents, in order to promote self-hygiene and civic consciousness and to help ease the problems of urban sprawl.

In 2004, Kumar was signed as Nescafe's brand ambassador in Tamil Nadu. He has since limited his appearance to the silver screen by not appearing in or promoting any commercials.

Kumar is passionate about UAVs and drones. Recently, he was appointed as the test pilot and UAV system advisor by Madras Institute of Technology for Medical Express-2018 UAV Challenge.

In November 2023, Kumar started Venus Motorcycle Tours, a motorcycle touring agency.

== Motorsport ==
Besides his acting career, Kumar is also an occasional racing driver, competing in circuits around India in places such as Mumbai, Chennai and Delhi. He is one among very few Indians to race in the International arena and in FIA championships. He has also been abroad for various races, including Germany and Malaysia. He drove in the 2003 Formula Asia BMW Championships. He raced in the 2010 Formula 2 Championship along with two other Indians, Armaan Ebrahim and Parthiva Sureshwaren.

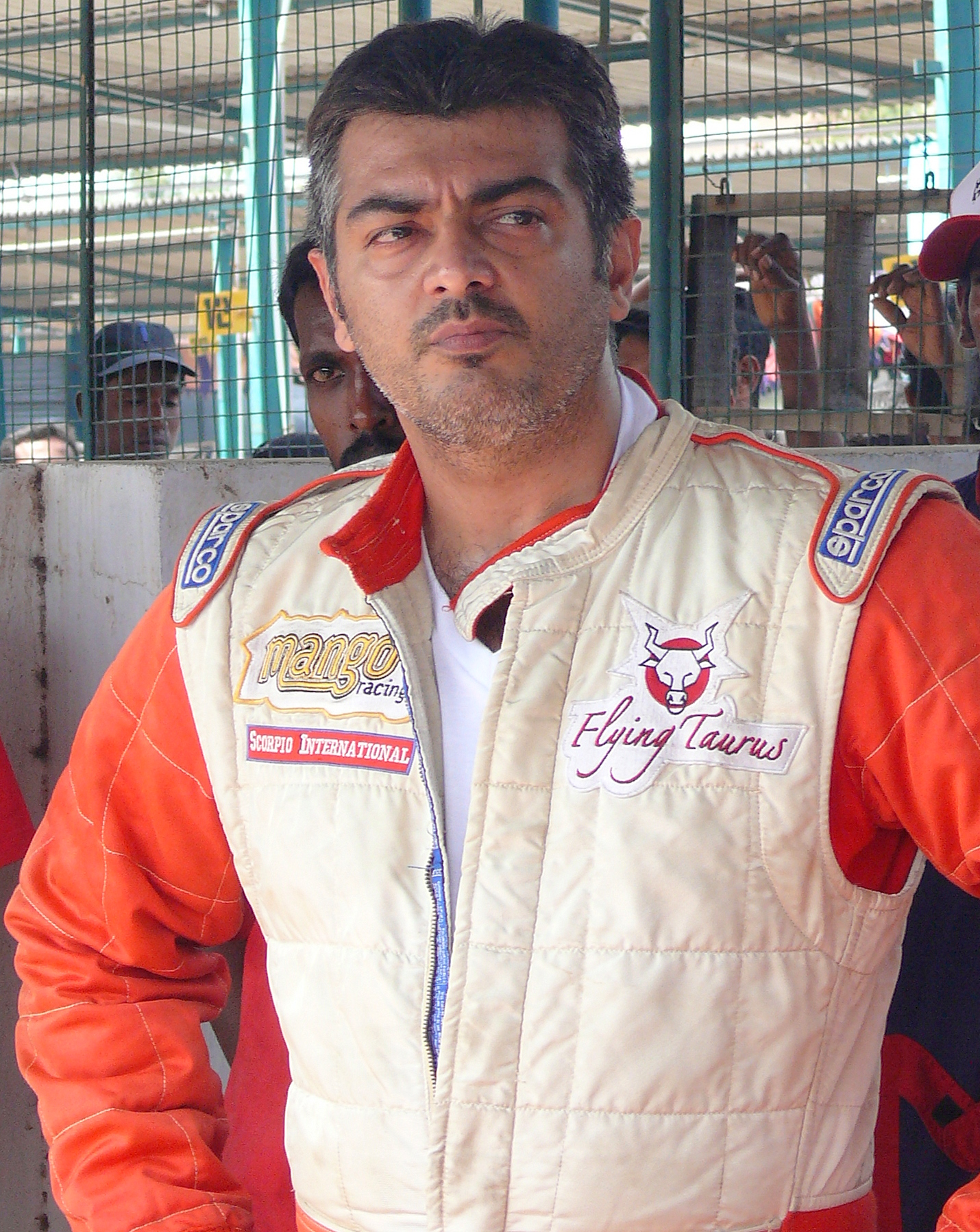
Ajith at Irungattukottai Race Track

In 2025, Kumar received the Philippe Charriol Award for Gentleman Driver of the Year at a ceremony held in Venice. The award was presented by Stéphane Ratel of the SRO Motorsports Group. Established in memory of watchmaker and racing enthusiast Philippe Charriol, the award is instituted by his daughter, Coralie Charriol.

=== Single-seater career ===
After a one-off race during the Formula Maruti Indian Championships in 2002, where he finished in fourth place, Kumar signed a contract with manager Akbar Ebrahim, confirming his participation in the inaugural Formula BMW Asia championship. Despite spinning out in the first lap of his first race, Kumar successfully completed the season by finishing twelfth.

After a six-year sabbatical, Kumar signed up for his third season of car racing by participating in the 2010 season of the FIA Formula Two Championship. The decision to be involved in the sport was made after Kumar's film directed by Gautham Vasudev Menon was delayed, allowing him to participate in the whole season. Prior to signing up, he competed in the final round of the MRF racing series in Chennai in February 2010, but failed to finish the race due to mechanical problems. Further trials in Sepang, Malaysia followed suit as he practised for the season's beginning in April 2010 in his Formula Renault V6 car with Eurasian Racing, shedding 11 kilograms during training.

=== Prototype racing ===
Kumar debuted with his own newly-formed team Ajith Kumar Racing in the 24H Series in the Porsche 992 GT3 Cup Category. This also marked his return to racing after a 15-year gap and reportedly shed 25 kilograms in preparation for the race.

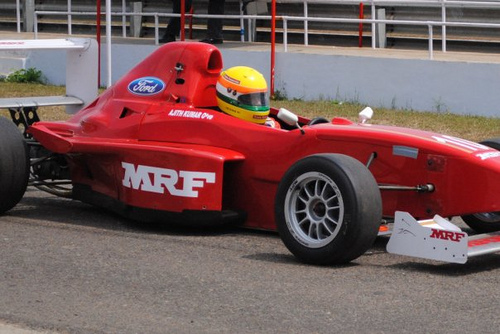
Ajith at MRF racing series (2010) in Chennai

Kumar participated alongside Fabian Duffieux, Mathieu Detry and Cameron McLeod. The team secured third place in the 991 category, and he also received the Spirit of the Race recognition in the GT4 category. Kumar subsequently took part in the 2025–26 Asian Le Mans Series driving a Ligier JS P325 for Team Virage alongside Julien Gerbi and former Formula 1 driver Narain Karthikeyan. Kumar is contracted to race in the 2026 Le Mans Cup.

== Personal life ==
Kumar dated actress Heera Rajagopal in the mid-1990s, but he ended the relationship in 1998.

In 1999, during the shoot of Saran's Amarkkalam, Kumar started dating his co-star Shalini. At that time, their involvement made them a regular subject of tabloid gossip. Although actor Ramesh Khanna had advised Ajith not to marry an actress, Kumar proposed to Shalini in June 1999 and they were married in April 2000 in Chennai. They have two children together: a daughter (born 2008) and a son (born 2015). Through his marriage to Shalini, he became brother-in-law to actor Richard Rishi and actress Shamili, who played his on-screen sister-in-law in Rajiv Menon's Kandukondain Kandukondain.

== Racing record ==
=== Racing career summary ===
Season	Series	Team	Races	Wins	Poles	F/Laps	Podiums	Points	Position
2002	Formula Maruti	Team India Racing	1	0	0	0	0	0	—
2003	Formula BMW Asia	Team India Racing	11	0	0	0	0	29	12th
2004	British Formula 3 International Series - Scholarship	Mango Racing	10	0	0	0	2	70	7th
2010	FIA Formula Two Championship	MotorSport Vision	6	0	0	0	0	0	24th
2025	24H Series - 992	Ajith Kumar Racing by BKR/Red Ant	5	0	1	0	0	92	6th
2025	Middle East Trophy - 992	Ajith Kumar Racing by BKR	1	0	0	0	0	0	—
2025	Middle East Trophy - GT4	Razoon – More Than Racing	1	0	0	0	0	0	—
2025	GT4 European Series - Am	AV Racing	12	0	0	0	0	72	7th
2025–26	24H Series Middle East	Ajith Redant Racing	3	0	0	0	0	0	—
2025–26	Asian Le Mans Series - LMP3	Team Virage	6	0	0	0	0	10	13th
2026	24H Series - GT3	Ajith Redant Racing							
2026	Le Mans Cup - LMP3	Ajith RedAnt by Virage	4	0	0	0	0	16*	12th*

^{*} Season still in progress.

=== Complete Formula BMW Asia results ===
(key)

Year	Entrant	1	2	3	4	5	6	7	8	9	10	11	12	13	14	DC	Points
2003	Team India Racing	SEP1; 1 Ret	SEP1; 2; 10	SEP2; 1 ??	SEP2; 2 ??	JOH; 1; 9	JOH; 2; 8	BIR; 1; 8	BIR; 2; 6	TAE; 1 Ret	TAE; 2; 6	AUT; 1 Ret	AUT; 2 ??	BEI; 1 Ret	BEI; 2; 8	12th	29

=== Complete British Formula Three Championship results ===
(key)

Year	Entrant	Chassis	Engine	Class	1	2	3	4	5	6	7	8	9	10	11	12	13	14	15	16	17	18	19	20	21	22	23	24	25	DC	Points
2004	Mango Racing	Dallara F301	Mugen-Honda	Scholarship	DON; 1; 21	DON; 2; 15	SIL; 1 Ret	SIL; 2 C	CRO; 1 Ret	CRO; 2; 18	KNO; 1; 18	KNO; 2; 16	SNE; 1; 18	SNE; 2; 18	SNE; 3; 21	CAS; 1	CAS; 2	DON; 1	DON; 2	OUL; 1	OUL; 2	SIL; 1	SIL; 2	THR; 1	THR; 2	SPA; 1	SPA; 2	BRH; 1	BRH; 2	7th	70

=== Complete FIA Formula Two Championship results ===
(key) (Races in bold indicate pole position) (Races in italics indicate fastest lap)

Year	Entrant	Chassis	1	2	3	4	5	6	7	8	9	10	11	12	13	14	15	16	17	18	Pos	Points
2010	MotorSport Vision	Williams JPH1	SIL; 1; 18	SIL; 2; 18	MAR; 1; 13	MAR; 2; 13	MNZ; 1; 14	MNZ; 2; 15	ZOL; 1	ZOL; 2	ALG; 1	ALG; 2	BRH; 1	BRH; 2	BRN; 1	BRN; 2	OSC; 1	OSC; 2	VAL; 1	VAL; 2	24th	0

=== Complete GT4 European Series results ===
(key) (Races in bold indicate pole position) (Races in italics indicate fastest lap)

Year	Team	Car	Class	1	2	3	4	5	6	7	8	9	10	11	12	Pos	Points
2025	AV Racing	Porsche 718 Cayman GT4 RS Clubsport	Am Cup	LEC; 1; 7	LEC; 2; 6	ZAN; 1; 7	ZAN; 2 Ret	SPA; 1; 6	SPA; 2; 7	MIS; 1; 6	MIS; 2 Ret	NÜR; 1; 8	NÜR; 2; 9	CAT; 1; 5	CAT; 2; 6	7th	72

=== Complete Asian Le Mans Series results ===
(key) (Races in bold indicate pole position) (Races in italics indicate fastest lap)

Year	Team	Class	Car	1	2	3	4	5	6	Pos.	Points
2025–26	Team Virage	LMP3	Ligier JS P325	SEP; 1 NC	SEP; 2; 8	DUB; 1; 7	DUB; 2 NC	ABU; 1	ABU; 2	13th*	10*

=== Complete Le Mans Cup results ===
(key) (Races in bold indicate pole position; results in italics indicate fastest lap)

Year	Entrant	Class	Chassis	1	2	3	4	5	6	Rank	Points
2026	Ajith RedAnt by Virage	LMP3 Pro-Am	Ligier JS P325	BAR; 9	LEC; 9	LMS; 9	SPA; Ret	SIL	POR	12th*	16*

^{*} Season still in progress.
