= Ji (film) =

- Theatrical release poster
- Directed by: N. Lingusamy
- Written by: N. Lingusamy
- Produced by: S. S. Chakravarthy
- Starring: Ajith Kumar; Trisha
- Cinematography: Arthur A. Wilson
- Edited by: N. Ganesh Kumar
- Music by: Vidyasagar
- Production company: NIC Arts
- Distributed by: Kalasangham Films
- Release date: 11 February 2005
- Running time: 172 minutes
- Country: India
- Language: Tamil

Ji (transl. Emperor) is a 2005 Indian Tamil-language political action film written and directed by N. Lingusamy and produced by S. S. Chakravarthy. The film stars Ajith Kumar and Trisha in the lead roles with the music composed by Vidyasagar.

Ji was released on 11 February 2005 following a series of delays. It was a commercial failure.

== Plot ==
Vasu is a happy-go-lucky final-year college student who is forced to contest elections in the college after being persuaded by his friends Arun and Uma Shankar. He incurs the wrath of the local MLA Varadharajan, whose son Chezhiyan is studying in the same college and is also contesting the elections. In the course of events, Varadharajan's gang attacks Vasu and his friends.

Vasu's father Seenu, a tea shop owner, advises the students to take a plunge in politics and teach bad apples like Varadharajan a lesson. Taking cue from his words, Vasu does take the plunge in politics with the backing of college students and files a nomination for the assembly election in Kumbakonam constituency.

Varadharajan is annoyed and angry at Vasu's presumptuousness and tells him to back off from the elections. But Vasu goes ahead with his plans. The rest is a sequence of events by which Vasu wins the admiration of masses and succeeds in getting elected as MLA.

Varadharajan, unable to digest the defeat, plays a trick and burns a school, and Vasu is blamed for the death of innocent children. He gets sentenced to seven years of rigorous imprisonment.

After serving the term, Vasu returns back and meets Kasi who says all his friends are settled with family. Vasu meets few of his friends who are not ready to meet him as he was in Jail.

Finally, fight begins with hero and villain and villain gets killed.

== Cast ==
- Ajith Kumar as Vasu
- Trisha as Bhuvana
- Charan Raj as MLA Varadharajan
- Vijayakumar as Seenu, Vasu's father
- Manivannan as Raasi, cycle shop owner
- Visu as Raghavan
- Vinod Kumar as Police
- Venkat Prabhu as Uma Shankar, Vasu's friend
- Nithin Sathya as Arun, Vasu's friend
- Rajesh as Vasu's uncle
- Ilavarasu as Varadharajan's henchman
- Manobala as Train Passenger
- Pawan as Chezhiyan, Varadharajan's son
- Soori as College Student
- Hemalatha as Bhuvana's friend
- Inigo Prabhakaran as Raghu
- Shankar as Cycle Shop Worker
- Japan Kumar in a special appearance as a dancer in "Vamba Velaikku"

== Production ==
After the success of Run, N. Lingusamy announced his plans of re-collaborating with Madhavan in Sathyam, a film about student politics to be produced by A. M. Rathnam, but Madhavan opted out due to his work in Mani Ratnam's Aayutha Ezhuthu. The team also approached Srikanth, but he was later not signed. Lingusamy then approached Ajith Kumar in September 2003 to star in the film and the actor accepted with S. S. Chakravarthy taking over as producer for the film newly re-titled Ji. Initial reports suggested that either Kutty Radhika, Pooja or Nisha Kothari would be signed on as heroine, though the role was later given to Trisha Krishnan.

In January 2004, Lingusamy and Ajith clashed over the script of the film during the shoot in Kumbakonam, giving first indications of the instability of the unit. Lingusamy revealed that halfway through the production of Ji, he had a bad gut feeling about it and was quick to move on to the production of his next venture, Sandakozhi. Ajith Kumar suddenly moved on to work in A. R. Murugadoss's Mirattal in March 2004, leaving Ji temporarily shelved. He returned in July 2004 and was injured during the shoot of the film. Shooting was again cancelled by the producer in August 2004 as he ran into financial troubles with the cancellation causing Trisha and Ajith Kumar to give priority to other films. The first release date set for the film had been August 2004 although this was passed due to the delays of Ajith's other films at the time – Attagasam and Jana. Subsequently, several release dates were mentioned across late 2004 and then a promotional spree began signalling that the film would be released on 14 January 2005. Trisha's other commitments had left three songs unshot and the film was postponed from that date to 4 February. It later released on 11 February 2005.

== Soundtrack ==
The music was composed by Vidyasagar.

Track listing
| No. | Title | Lyrics | Singer(s) | Length |
|---|---|---|---|---|
| 1. | "Kiliye Kiliye" | Arivumathi | Udit Narayan, Sujatha Mohan | 4:30 |
| 2. | "Ding Dong" | Pa. Vijay | Madhu Balakrishnan, Madhushree | 4:33 |
| 3. | "Vamba Velaikku" | Kabilan | KK | 4:40 |
| 4. | "Sarala Kondayil" | Viveka | Karthik | 1:00 |
| 5. | "Yethanai Yethanai" | Yugabharathi | Shankar Sampoke | 5:15 |
| 6. | "Thiruttu Rascal" | Na. Muthukumar | Mano, Srilekha Parthasarathy | 4:53 |
| Total length: | | | | 24:51 |

== Reception ==
A critic from IndiaGlitz praised the film's plot, Ajith's acting and Vidyasagar's music but criticised the screenplay and length. Malathi Rangarajan The Hindu claimed that the film "could have been better", while Poornima of Rediff.com stated that the film was strictly for fans of Ajith. Visual Dasan of Kalki wrote that even if the film's path changes half way, Ji does not give the political awareness that is needed today.
