= Dhanush filmography =

Dhanush is an Indian actor, film producer, screenwriter and film director known for his work in Tamil cinema. He has also appeared in some Hindi, Telugu, English, and Malayalam films. He made his acting debut in 2002 with the coming of age drama, Thulluvadho Ilamai, directed by his father Kasthuri Raja. His role as a mentally-disturbed man in Kaadhal Kondein (2003)—directed by his brother Selvaraghavan—won him critical acclaim. The following year, he starred in Subramaniam Siva's Thiruda Thirudi, a commercial success. This was followed by a series of commercial failures—Pudhukottaiyilirundhu Saravanan (2004), Sullan (2004) and Dreams (2004). He had two releases in 2005—Devathaiyai Kanden and Adhu Oru Kana Kaalam.

In 2006, Dhanush starred in the gangster film Pudhupettai, which was critically acclaimed and moderately successful at the box-office. He next collaborated with debutant director Vetrimaaran in Polladhavan (2007). It was critically acclaimed and commercially successful. His subsequent releases—Yaaradi Nee Mohini (2008) and Padikkadavan—were box-office successes. He collaborated with Vetrimaaran for the second time in Aadukalam (2011). His role as a rooster fight jockey in the film won him that year's National Film Award for Best Actor and the Best Tamil Actor Award at the 60th Filmfare Awards South. In 2012, he received international attention with the song "Why This Kolaveri Di", which was recorded for Aishwarya R. Dhanush's directorial debut 3. His role as a man who is suffering from bipolar disorder in the film won him his second Filmfare Award.

Dhanush made his Bollywood debut with Aanand L. Rai's Raanjhanaa (2013). His performance as an obsessive one-sided lover in the film won him the Best Male Debut Award and earned a Best Actor nomination at the 59th Filmfare Awards. The same year he was seen in the survival film Maryan, which won him Best Actor Award (Critics) at the 61st Filmfare Awards South. In 2014, he produced and starred in cinematographer R. Velraj's directorial debut, Velaiilla Pattadhari, which was critically acclaimed as well as a box-office success. His performance as an unemployed graduate won a third Filmfare Award in the Best Tamil Actor category.

In 2015, Dhanush co-starred with Amitabh Bachchan in R. Balki's Shamitabh, where he played a mute superstar. The following year Dhanush played three roles in K. V. Anand's romantic thriller Anegan (2015) and a gangster in Balaji Mohan's Maari (2015), both becoming moderately success at the box office. He collaborated with Velraj's Thanga Magan (2015), which did not perform well at the box office when compared to his previous film. Dhanush had two releases in 2016—Prabhu Solomon's Thodari, a critical and commercial failure; and the political drama Kodi, where he played dual roles. The latter earned him a Best Tamil Actor nomination at the 64th Filmfare Awards South. The following year, he made his directorial debut with Pa. Pandi. In 2018, Dhanush made his first international film appearance with the English-language French film The Extraordinary Journey of the Fakir. For his performance in Asuran (2019), he won his second National Film Award for Best Actor.

== As an actor ==
Key
†	Denotes films that have not yet been released

- All films are in Tamil, unless mentioned otherwise.

List of Dhanush film credits as director
Year	Title	Role	Notes	Ref.
2002	Thulluvadho Ilamai	Mahesh		
2003	Kaadhal Kondein	Vinod		
2003	Thiruda Thirudi	Vasudevan		
2004	Pudhukottaiyilirundhu Saravanan	Saravanan		
2004	Sullan	Subramani (Sullan) (Note: Dhanush plays a character with two names.)		
2004	Dreams	Sakthi		
2005	Devathaiyai Kanden	Babu		
2005	Adhu Oru Kana Kaalam	Srinivasan		
2006	Pudhupettai	Kokki Kumar		
2006	Thiruvilaiyaadal Aarambam	Thiru Kumaran		
2007	Parattai Engira Azhagu Sundaram	Azhagu Sundaram alias Parattai		
2007	Polladhavan	Prabhu Shankar		
2008	Yaaradi Nee Mohini	Vasudevan		
2008	Kuselan	Himself	Guest appearance in the song "Cinema Cinema"	
2009	Padikkadavan	Radhakrishnan "Rocky"		
2010	Kutty	Kutty		
2010	Uthamaputhiran	Siva Ramakrishnan		
2011	Aadukalam	K. P. Karuppu		
2011	Seedan	Saravanan	Cameo	
2011	Mappillai	Saravanan		
2011	Venghai	Selvam		
2011	Mayakkam Enna	Karthik Swaminathan		
2012	3	Ramachandran "Ram"		
2013	Proprietors: Kammath & Kammath	Himself	Malayalam film; guest appearance	
2013	Ethir Neechal	Soup boy (Note: According to Dhanush's "Why This Kolaveri Di", a soup boy means a guy who has been dumped by a girl.)	Guest appearance	
2013	Raanjhanaa	Kundan Shankar	Hindi film	
2013	Maryan	Maryan		
2013	Naiyaandi	Chinna Vandu		
2014	Velaiilla Pattadhari	Raghuvaran "Raghu"	25th film	
2015	Shamitabh	Danish alias "Shamitabh"	Hindi film	
2015	Anegan	Ashwin, Murugappa, Kaali and Illamaran (Note: Dhanush plays Four characters.)		
2015	Vai Raja Vai	Kokki Kumar	Cameo	
2015	Maari	Maari		
2015	Thanga Magan	Thamizh		
2016	Thodari	Poochiyappan		
2016	Kodi	Kodi, Anbu (Note: Dhanush plays two characters.)		
2017	Pa. Pandi	Pandian Palanisamy (Note: Dhanush plays the younger version of the title character played by Rajkiran.)	Also director and screenwriter	
2017	Velaiilla Pattadhari 2	Raghuvaran "Raghu"	Also screenwriter (Note: Some of Dhanush's scenes were reshot in Telugu while the other actors only shot for the film in Tamil.)	
2018	The Extraordinary Journey of the Fakir	Ajatashatru Lavash Patel	English film	
2018	Vada Chennai	Anbu		
2018	Maari 2	Maariyappan "Maari"		
2019	Asuran	Sivasaamy		
2019	Enai Noki Paayum Thota	Raghu		
2020	Pattas	Sakthi alias "Pattas", Dhiraviyaperumal		
2021	Karnan	Karnan		
2021	Jagame Thandhiram	Suruli		
2021	Atrangi Re	S. Venkatesh Vishwanath "Vishu" Iyer	Hindi film	
2022	Maaran	Mathimaaran "Maaran" Sathyamoorthy		
2022	The Gray Man	Avik San alias "Lone Wolf"	English film	
2022	Thiruchitrambalam	Thiruchitrambalam Jr. alias "Pazham"		
2022	Naane Varuvean	Kathir, Prabhu	Also screenwriter	
2023	Vaathi/Sir	Balamurugan "Bala" / Bal Gangadhar Tilak "Balu"	Tamil-Telugu bilingual film	
2024	Captain Miller	Analeesan "Easa" / Captain Miller		
2024	Raayan	Kathavaraayan "Raayan"	50th film; Also writer and director	
2025	Kuberaa	Deva	Telugu-Tamil bilingual film	
2025	Idli Kadai	Murugan Sivanesan	Also writer, director and co-producer	
2025	Tere Ishk Mein	Shankar Gurukkal	Hindi film	
2026	Kara	Karasaami "Kara"		
2026	O.M: Operation Mole	Pazhanivel (Agent D-402) / Thirukumaran		
TBA	D56 †	TBA	Filming	
TBA	Thamizh Murugan †	TBA	Announced	

== As a producer ==
- All films are in Tamil, unless mentioned otherwise.

List of Dhanush film credits as producer
Year	Title	Notes	Ref.
2012	3		
2013	Ethir Neechal		
2014	Velaiilla Pattadhari		
2015	Kaaki Sattai		
2015	Kaaka Muttai		
2015	Maari		
2015	Naanum Rowdy Dhaan		
2015	Thanga Magan		
2016	Visaranai		
2016	Amma Kanakku		
2017	Cinema Veeran		
2017	Pa. Pandi		
2017	Velaiilla Pattadhari 2		
2017	Tharangam	Malayalam film	
2018	Kaala		
2018	Vada Chennai		
2018	Maari 2		
2025	Nilavaku En Mel Ennadi Kobam		
2025	Idli Kadai		
2026	O.M: Operation Mole		
TBA	Tamizh Murugan †	Announced	

== As a director ==
List of Dhanush film credits as director
Year	Title	Ref.
2017	Pa. Pandi	
2024	Raayan	
2025	Nilavuku En Mel Ennadi Kobam	
2025	Idli Kadai	

== As a lyricist ==
- Note: he is credited as Poetu Dhanush.
- (D) indicates dubbing.

List of lyrics by Dhanush
Year	Title	Album	Composer	Notes				
Year	Title	Album	Composer	Notes	2011	"Pirai Thedum"	Mayakkam Enna	G. V. Prakash Kumar
"Voda Voda Dhooram Korayala"					2011		Mayakkam Enna	G. V. Prakash Kumar
"Kadhal En Kadhal"					2011		Mayakkam Enna	G. V. Prakash Kumar
2012	"Come On Girls"	3	Anirudh Ravichander					
2012	"Nee Partha Vizhigal"	3	Anirudh Ravichander					
2012	"Why This Kolaveri Di"	3	Anirudh Ravichander					
2012	"Kannazhaga"	3	Anirudh Ravichander					
2012	"Po Nee Po"	3	Anirudh Ravichander					
2012	"Po Nee Po (Remix)"	3	Anirudh Ravichander					
2013	"Nijamellam Maranthu Pochu"	Ethir Neechal	Anirudh Ravichander					
2013	"Boomi Enna Suthude"	Ethir Neechal	Anirudh Ravichander					
2013	"Kadal Raasa Naan"	Maryan	A. R. Rahman					
2014	"Vellailla Pattathari"	Velaiilla Pattadhari	Anirudh Ravichander					
2014	"Amma Amma"	Velaiilla Pattadhari	Anirudh Ravichander					
2014	"Po Indru Neeyaga"	Velaiilla Pattadhari	Anirudh Ravichander					
2014	"What a Karavad"	Velaiilla Pattadhari	Anirudh Ravichander					
2014	"Ey Inga Paru"	Velaiilla Pattadhari	Anirudh Ravichander					
2014	"Udhungada Sangu"	Velaiilla Pattadhari	Anirudh Ravichander					
2014	"Move Your Body"	Vai Raja Vai	Yuvan Shankar Raja					
2015	"Oh Oh"	Thanga Magan	Anirudh Ravichander					
2015	"Enna Solla"	Thanga Magan	Anirudh Ravichander					
2015	"Tak Bak"	Thanga Magan	Anirudh Ravichander					
2015	"Jodi Nilave"	Thanga Magan	Anirudh Ravichander					
2015	"Oru Vidha Aasai"	Maari	Anirudh Ravichander					
2015	"Don'u Don'u Don'u"	Maari	Anirudh Ravichander					
2015	"Maari Thara Local"	Maari	Anirudh Ravichander					
2016	"Kodi"	Kodi	Santhosh Narayanan					
2017	"Soorakathu"	Pa. Pandi	Sean Roldan					
2017	"Venpani Malare"	Pa. Pandi	Sean Roldan					
2017	"Life of Raghuvaran"	Velaiilla Pattadhari 2	Sean Roldan					
2017	"Angel of Raghuvaran"	Velaiilla Pattadhari 2	Sean Roldan					
2017	"Torture of Raghuvaran"	Velaiilla Pattadhari 2	Sean Roldan					
2018	"Rowdy Baby"	Maari 2	Yuvan Shankar Raja					
2018	"Maari's Anandhi"	Maari 2	Yuvan Shankar Raja					
2019	"Ilamai Thirumbudhe"	Petta	Anirudh Ravichander					
2019	"Nenjodu Vinaa"	Brother's Day	4 Musics	Malayalam film				
2021	"Nethu"	Jagame Thandhiram	Santhosh Narayanan					
2021	"Little Little"	Galatta Kalyaanam (D)	A. R. Rahman	Dubbed version				
2022	"Chittu Kuruvi"	Maaran	G. V. Prakash Kumar					
2022	"Thaai Kelavi"	Thiruchitrambalam	Anirudh Ravichander					
2022	"Megham Karukaatha"	Thiruchitrambalam	Anirudh Ravichander					
2022	"Thenmozhi"	Thiruchitrambalam	Anirudh Ravichander					
2022	"Mayakkama Kalakkama"	Thiruchitrambalam	Anirudh Ravichander					
2022	"Kanneer Sindha"	Thiruchitrambalam	Anirudh Ravichander					
2022	"Rendu Raaja"	Naane Varuvean	Yuvan Shankar Raja					
2023	"Vaa Vaathi"	Vaathi	G. V. Prakash Kumar					
2023	"One Life"	Vaathi	G. V. Prakash Kumar					
2023	"Vaa Vaathi (Reprise)"	Vaathi	G. V. Prakash Kumar					
2024	"Adangaatha Asuran"	Raayan	A. R. Rahman					
2024	"Oh Raaya"	Raayan	A. R. Rahman					
2024	"Kadhal Fail"	Nilavuku En Mel Ennadi Kobam	G. V. Prakash Kumar					
2025	"Pulla"	Nilavuku En Mel Ennadi Kobam	G. V. Prakash Kumar					
2025	"Pulla (Reprise)"	Nilavuku En Mel Ennadi Kobam	G. V. Prakash Kumar					
2025	"Enna Sugam"	Idli Kadai	G. V. Prakash Kumar					
2025	"Enjaami Thandhaane"	Idli Kadai	G. V. Prakash Kumar					
2025	"Yen Paattan Saami Varum"	Idli Kadai	G. V. Prakash Kumar					
2025	"Chinnaware"	Tere Ishk Mein	A. R. Rahman	Hindi film				
2025	"Chinnaware"	Tere Ishk Mein - (((D)))	A. R. Rahman	Tamil dubbed film				
2025	"Chinnaware"	Tere Ishk Mein - (((D)))	A. R. Rahman	Telugu dubbed film				
2026	"Kannamma En Kannamma"	Kara	G. V. Prakash Kumar					

== See also ==
- Wunderbar Films
- List of awards and nominations received by Dhanush
