= List of awards and nominations received by Dhanush =

Dhanush awards and nominations
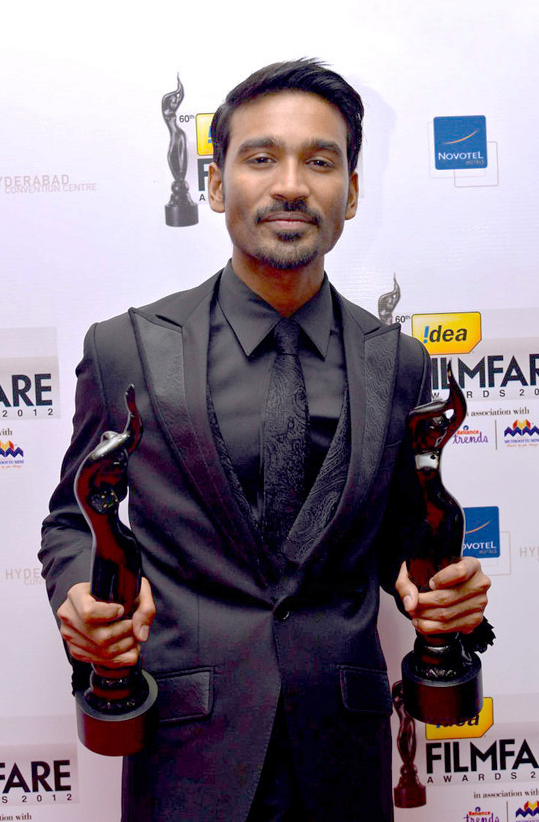
- Dhanush at 60th Filmfare Awards South 2013
Awards and nominations
Award	Wins	Nominations

Totals (Note: Certain award groups do not simply award one winner. They acknowledge several different recipients, have runners-up, and have third place. Since this is a specific recognition and is different from losing an award, runner-up mentions are considered wins in this award tally. For simplification and to avoid errors, each award in this list has been presumed to have had a prior nomination.)
- Wins: 48
- Nominations: 38

Dhanush, is an Indian actor, producer, director, writer, lyricist, and playback singer who predominantly works in Tamil cinema. Starring in 54 films over his career, among Dhanush's awards include 14 SIIMA Awards, nine Vijay Awards, eight Filmfare Awards South, five Vikatan Awards, five Edison Awards, six National Film Awards (three as actor, two as producer, one as director), and a Filmfare Award. He has been included in the Forbes India Celebrity 100 list six times, which is based on the earnings of Indian celebrities.

== Film Awards ==
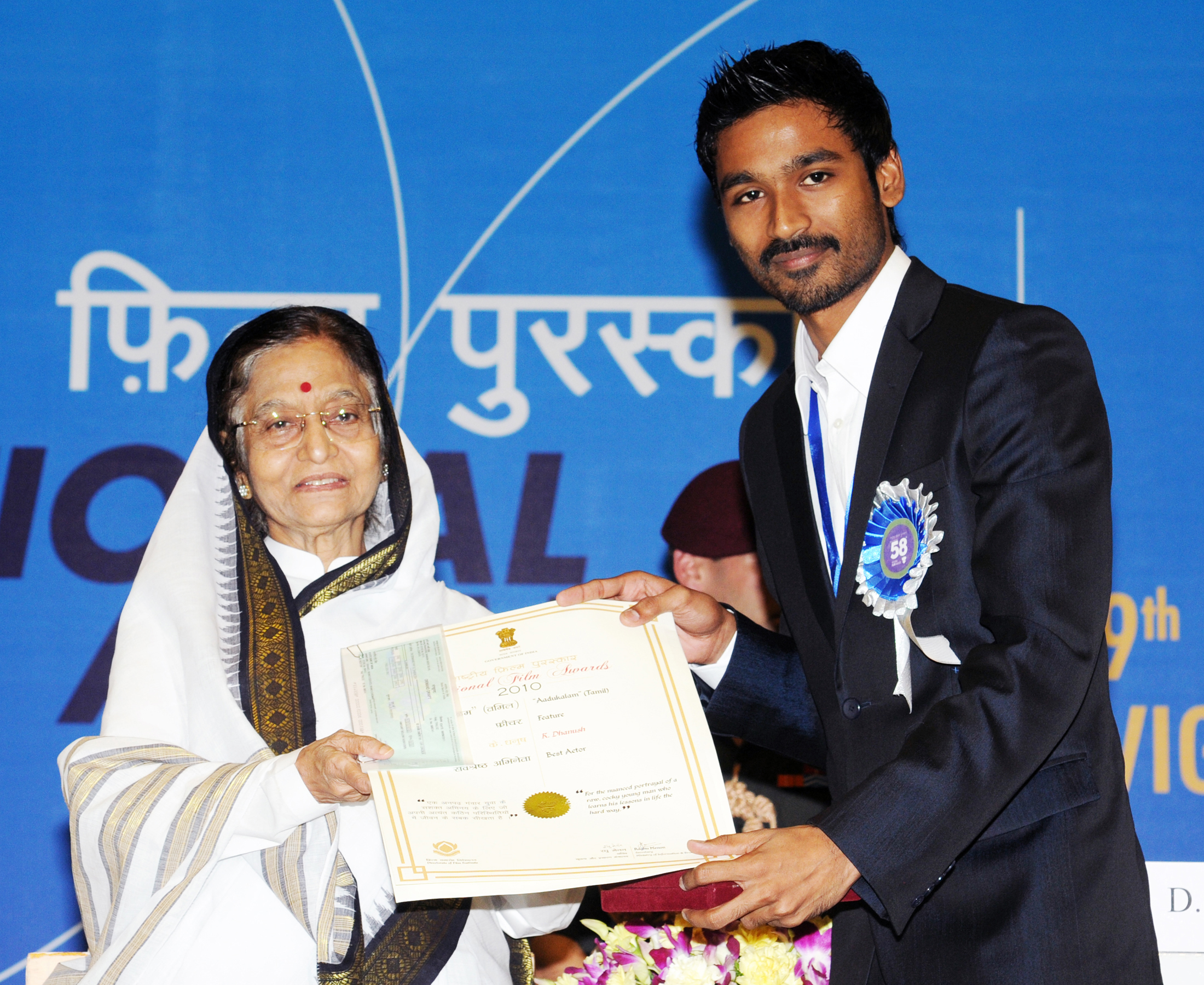
Dhanush receiving the Rajat Kamal Award (for the Best Actor) from Pratibha Patil, the then President of India, at the 58th National Film Awards ceremony held in New Delhi in September 2011.

=== National Film Awards ===
Year	Category	Film	Result
2010 (58th) †	Best Actor	Aadukalam	Won
2014 (62nd)	Best Children's Film (co-producer)	Kaaka Muttai	Won
2015 (63rd)	Best Feature Film in Tamil (co-producer)	Visaranai	Won
2019 (67th) †	Best Actor	Asuran	Won
2024 (72th)	Best Tamil Feature Film (Director)	Raayan	Won
2024 (72th)	Special Mention (Actor)	Captain Miller	Won

=== Tamil Nadu State Film Award ===
Year	Category	Film	Result
2014	Special Prize - Best Film	Kaaka Muttai (Producer)	Won
2018	Best Actor	Vada Chennai	Won

=== Filmfare Awards ===
Year	Category	Film	Result	Ref.
2014	Best Male Debut	Raanjhanaa	Won	
2014	Best Actor	Raanjhanaa	Nominated	
2022	Best Actor	Atrangi Re	Nominated	

=== Filmfare Awards South ===
Year	Category	Film	Result	Ref.
2003	Best Actor	Kadhal Kondein	Nominated	
2008	Best Actor	Yaaradi Nee Mohini	Nominated	
2010	Best Male Playback Singer	"Un Mele Aasaidhaan" from Aayirathil Oruvan	Nominated	
2011	Best Actor	Aadukalam	Won	
2012	Best Male Playback Singer	"Why This Kolaveri Di" from 3	Won	
2012	Best Actor	3	Won	
2013	Best Actor	Maryan	Nominated	
2013	Critics Best Actor – Tamil	Maryan	Won	
2014	Best Actor	Velaiyilla Pattathari	Won	
2014	Best Film	Velaiyilla Pattathari	Nominated	
2015	Best Film	Kaaka Muttai (co-producer)	Won	
2015	Best Actor	Anegan	Nominated	
2016	Best Film	Visaranai (co-producer)	Nominated	
2016	Best Director	Pa. Pandi	Nominated	
2016	Best Actor	Kodi	Nominated	
2016	Best Male Playback Singer	"No Problem" from Vajrakaya	Nominated	
2018	Best Film	Vada Chennai	Nominated	
2018	Best Actor	Vada Chennai	Won	
2018	Best Male Playback Singer	"Rowdy Baby" from Maari 2	Nominated	
2021	Best Actor	Karnan	Nominated	
2022	Best Actor	Thiruchitrambalam	Nominated	
2022	Best Actor (Critics)	Thiruchitrambalam	Won	
2022	Best Lyricist - "Megham Karukkatha"	Thiruchitrambalam	Nominated	
2022	Best Male Playback Singer - "Megham Karukkatha"	Thiruchitrambalam	Nominated	
2023	Best Actor - Telugu	Vaathi	Nominated	
2024	Best Actor	Captain Miller	Nominated	

=== Vijay Awards ===
Year	Category	Film	Result
2007	Best Actor	Polladhavan	Nominated
2007	Favorite Hero	Polladhavan	Nominated
2008	Best Entertainer of the Year	Yaaradi Nee Mohini	Won
2008	Best Actor	Yaaradi Nee Mohini	Nominated
2011	Favorite Hero	Aadukalam	Nominated
2011	Best Actor	Aadukalam	Nominated
2011	Best Lyricist	"Voda Voda" from Mayakkam Enna	Nominated
2011	Best Crew (actor)	Aadukalam	Won
2011	Best Entertainer of the Year	Aadukalam & Mayakkam Enna	Won
2012	Best Actor	3	Won
2012	Best Male Playback Singer	"Why This Kolaveri Di" from 3	Nominated
2012	Best Lyricist	"Po Nee Po" from 3	Won
2012	Favorite Hero	3	Won
2013	Best Actor	Maryan	Nominated
2013	Best Crew (producer)	Ethir Neechal	Won
2013	Favorite Hero	Maryan	Nominated
2014	Best Lyricist	"Amma Amma" from Velaiyilla Pattathari	Nominated
2014	Favorite Hero	Velaiyilla Pattathari	Nominated
2014	Favorite Film (producer)	Velaiyilla Pattathari	Nominated
2014	Best Actor	Velaiyilla Pattathari	Won
2014	Best Film (producer)	Velaiyilla Pattathari	Won
2017	Best Entertainer of the Year	Pa. Pandi, Velaiilla Pattadhari 2	Won

=== South Indian International Movie Awards (SIIMA) ===
Year	Category	Film	Result	Ref.
2011	Best Actor	Aadukalam	Won	
2011	Best Male Playback Singer	"Voda Voda" from Mayakkam Enna	Won	
2011	Sensation of South Indian Cinema	Various films	Won	
2011	Best Lyricist	"Pirai Thedum" from Mayakkam Enna	Nominated	
2012	Best Actor	3	Won	
2012	Best Lyricist	"Kannazhaga" from 3	Won	
2012	Best Singer	"Why This Kolaveri Di" from 3	Won	
2012	Best Debutant Producer	Wunderbar Films for 3	Nominated	
2012	Sensation of Innovative Marketing	Wunderbar Films for 3	Won	
2013	Best Actor (Critics)	Maryan	Won	
2014	Best Actor	Velaiyilla Pattathari	Won	
2014	Best Lyricist	"Amma Amma" from Velaiyilla Pattathari	Won	
2014	Pride of South Indian Cinema	—	Won	
2015	Best Film (co-producer)	Kaaka Muttai	Nominated	
2015	Best Actor	Anegan	Nominated	
2016	Best Film	Visaranai (co-producer)	Nominated	
2017	Best Debut Director	Pa. Pandi	Nominated	
2017	Best Lyricist	Pa. Pandi	Nominated	
2018	Best Actor	Vada Chennai	Won	
2018	Best Film	Vada Chennai (co-producer)	Nominated	
2019	Best Actor	Asuran	Won	
2020	Best Actor	Pattas	Nominated	
2021	Best Actor	Karnan (2021 film)	Nominated	
2022	Best Actor	Thiruchitrambalam	Nominated	
2023	Best Actor - Telugu	Vaathi	Nominated	
2024	Best Actor	Raayan	Nominated	
2025	Best Actor - Telugu	Kuberaa	Nominated	
2025	Best Male Playback Singer - Telugu	"Poyira Mama" from Kuberaa	Nominated	

=== Edison Awards (India) ===
The Edison Awards have been presented by the Tamil television channel MyTamilMovie.com since 2009 to honour excellence in Tamil cinema.

Year	Category	Film	Result	Ref.
2013	Best Actor	Maryan	Won	
2014	Best Actor	Velaiyilla Pattathari	Won	
2015	Best Producer	Kaaka Muttai	Won	
2015	Mass Hero	Maari	Won	
2018	Best Actor	Vada Chennai	Won	
2019	Best Actor	Asuran	Won	

=== Vikatan Award ===
Ananda Vikatan, one of the leading weeklies of Tamil Nadu has been awarding the films, actors and technicians on various criteria.

Year	Category	Film	Result	Ref.
2014	Best Actor	Velaiyilla Pattathari	Won	
2015	Best Film	Kaaka Muttai	Won	
2016	Best Film	Visaranai	Won	
2018	Best Actor	Vada Chennai	Won	
2019	Best Actor	Asuran	Won	

=== IIFA Utsavam ===
Year	Category	Film	Result
2015	Best Lyricist – Tamil	"Don-u Don-u Don-u" from Maari	Won
2015	Best Male Playback Singer – Tamil	"Danga Maari" from Anegan	Nominated
2015	Best Male Playback Singer – Kannada	"No Problem" from Vajrakaya	Won

== Other honours and recognition ==
- Stylish Star Of South Cinema - Chennai Times Award (2011)
- CNN Top Song Of 2011 Award - Why This Kolaveri Di (2011)
- Asianet Most Popular Actor (Tamil) (2011)
- Chennai Times Award - Best Actor for 3 (2012)
- Behindwoods Gold Medal - Best Acting Performance for Maryan (2014)
- IIFA Award for Star Debut of the Year – Male (2014)
- Zee Cine Award for Best Male Debut (2014)
- SICA Award - Best Actor for Velaiyilla Pattathari (2015)
- Tamil Nadu State Film Award -Special Prize for Kaaka Muttai (2017)
- MGR Sivaji Academy Award - Sensational Debut Director for Pa. Pandi (2018)
- Vanitha Film Awards- Best Actor Tamil for Vada Chennai (2018)

=== Nominations ===
- Big Star Entertainment Awards (2013) - Most Entertaining Debutant Actor for Raanjhanaa (2013)
- Star Screen Award Most Promising Newcomer - Male for Raanjhanaa (2013)
- Star Screen Award Best Actor - Popular Choice for Raanjhanaa (2013)
