= Kavan (film) =

2017 film by K. V. Anand

- Theatrical release poster
- Directed by: K. V. Anand
- Screenplay by: Subha; K. V. Anand; Kabilan Vairamuthu
- Story by: Subha; K. V. Anand
- Produced by: Kalpathi S. Aghoram; Kalpathi S. Ganesh; Kalpathi S. Suresh
- Starring: Vijay Sethupathi; T. Rajendar; Vikranth; Madonna Sebastian; Akashdeep Saigal
- Cinematography: Abinandhan Ramanujam
- Edited by: Anthony
- Music by: Hiphop Tamizha
- Production company: AGS Entertainment
- Distributed by: Eros International
- Release date: 31 March 2017
- Running time: 160 minutes
- Country: India
- Language: Tamil

Kavan (/kəvən/ transl. Catapult) is a 2017 Indian Tamil-language political thriller film directed by K. V. Anand and produced by AGS Entertainment. The film stars Vijay Sethupathi, Madonna Sebastian, T. Rajendar, Vikranth and Akashdeep Saigal, while Darshana Rajendran, Pandiarajan, Bose Venkat, and Jagan play supporting roles. It follows an idealistic television reporter who, in defiance of his corrupt boss, aids a group of people protesting against a pesticide factory owned by a corrupt politician.

Principal photography for Kavan took place between July and November 2016. The music was composed by Hiphop Tamizha with cinematography by Abinandhan Ramanujam and editing by Anthony. The film was released on 31 March 2017 to positive reviews from critics and became a commercial success. Venkat won the Tamil Nadu State Film Award for Best Supporting Actor, and Hiphop Tamizha won for Best Music Director in the same ceremony.

== Plot ==
Thilak is a news anchor at Zen One TV, run by corrupt and unethical media baron Kalyan, who uses sensationalism to boost TRP and is closely associated with powerful, corrupt politician Dheeran Maniarasu. Kalyan suppresses negative coverage of Dheeran in exchange for kickbacks. Thilak's ex-girlfriend Malar also works at Zen One. Although she initially avoids him, they reconcile after she realises that she still loves him.

Malar learns that her social activist friend Kalpana has been assaulted, with her boyfriend Abdul Kader blamed for the attack. Thilak, creative head Ashok and Malar smuggle Kalpana from hospital and persuade her to reveal the truth. She explains that Dheeran's goons assaulted her for protesting against his pesticide factory, whose toxic effluents had devastated a once-prosperous village. Abdul was framed for the assault. Kalpana's account is broadcast live, winning widespread public support, but Kalyan counters with a video portraying her as "mentally ill" and claiming she sought to defame Dheeran because of her "mental state".

Thilak attempts to expose Dheeran on a talk show despite being ordered to ask questions dictated by Zen One management. A confrontation escalates into a brawl, during which Thilak assaults Ashok, who produced the defamatory video. Thilak then denounces Kalyan's cronyism and lack of journalism ethics, prompting Kalyan to fire and blacklist him across major media networks. Malar, executive producer Jagan, and colleagues Nishandhini and Aarthi resign in solidarity and are blacklisted as well.

The group joins Muthamizh TV, a struggling local channel run by Mayilvaganan. Thilak reports from the affected village, broadcasts the villagers' plight, and gives Abdul and Kalpana an opportunity to tell their side of the story. He also broadcasts footage of Dheeran assaulting him at Zen One, exposing both Dheeran and Kalyan. In retaliation, Kalyan conspires with Dheeran to bomb the DC's office and frame Abdul, who had been there shortly beforehand, as a terrorist. Thilak, Malar and Muthamizh are also framed as co-conspirators, resulting in Muthamizh being blacked out by the Central Government.

While on the run, Thilak records Abdul stating that he was framed by Dheeran and Zen One, followed by footage of Ashok and the police staging a fake encounter to kill Abdul. As part of Thilak's plan to expose Kalyan and Dheeran, Jagan, Aarthi and Nishandhini rejoin Zen One and broadcast both videos from the channel with help from Pillai, Zen One's chief editor, who had silently endured the management's abuses.

With Kalyan and Dheeran fully exposed, they confront Thilak at the Muthamizh studio and openly admit and justify their crimes. However, their confession is secretly recorded by the Police Commissioner, who has been working undercover at Muthamizh. Kalyan and Dheeran are arrested, while Thilak, Mayilvaganan, Malar, Jagan, Pillai, Nisha and Aishwarya celebrate their victory.

== Cast ==
- Vijay Sethupathi as Thilak
- T. Rajendar as Mayilvaganan
- Madonna Sebastian as Malar
- Vikranth as Abdul Kader
- Akashdeep Saigal as Kalyan
- Darshana Rajendran as Kalpana
- Pandiarajan as Pillai
- Bose Venkat as Dheeran Maniarasu (Theechatti Mannaru)
- Jagan as Jagan
- R. N. R. Manohar as Thilak's father
- Five Star Krishna as Ashok
- Priyadarshini Rajkumar as Bavana
- Chandini Tamilarasan as Nimmi
- D. R. K. Kiran as Inspector Bala
- Vikram Chakkravarthy as Raghavan
- Bhawana Aneja as Lakshmi
- Aishwarya as Nisha
- Shwetha as Shwetha
- Rekha Suresh as Nurse
- Nassar as Police Commissioner (guest appearance)
- Powerstar Srinivasan as himself (guest appearance)
- Anthony as a person in the bar (cameo appearance)
- K. V. Anand as himself (voice acting) and additionally in a brief cameo as a tea seller

== Production ==
After the release of Anegan director K. V. Anand expressed his desire to commence his next film, which is said to be on the lines of the directors own Ko. The project was confirmed on 22 March 2016. This marked the third collaboration of K. V. Anand with AGS Entertainment producing. The script was co-written by Kabilan Vairamuthu along with Anand's favourite duo, Subha (Suresh and Balakrishnan). The film stars filmmaker-actor T. Rajendar, who returned as an actor after a gap of ten years since he acted in a full-fledged role. He considered the role to reflect his "real" self of soft-spoken, contrary to his reputation for speaking powerfully. Akashdeep Saigal, whose last Tamil film was Anand's Ayan (2009) was signed on to play a key role, making a comeback.

The first schedule commenced on 11 July 2016, and was completed by August 2016. The title Kavan was revealed in late October 2016. Regarding the decision to choose this title, Anand said that the term, which means a catapult, symbolically refers to a "hero aiming for his target, and also sounded good". Filming wrapped in November.

== Soundtrack ==
Kavan

Soundtrack album by Hiphop Tamizha
- Released: 12 February 2017
- Venue: Chennai
- Studio: Hiphop Tamizha Studios
- Genre: Film soundtrack
- Labels: AGS Entertainment; Divo
- Producer: Hiphop Tamizha

Hiphop Tamizha chronology
Kaththi Sandai (2016)	Kavan (2017)	Meesaya Murukku (2017)

The soundtrack album was composed by Hiphop Tamizha, making their first collaboration with director K. V. Anand and replacing his norm composer Harris Jayaraj. One of the songs in the album, "Happy New Year", was released on YouTube as a single on 30 December 2016. The audio rights are also secured by the production house itself, alongside Divo. The whole album was launched at Suryan FM on 12 February 2017. Reviewing the album, The Times of India wrote, "With KV Anand moving away from Harris Jayaraj, the album has songs that have the feel of the songs of his films, albeit with a twist".

Song title	Singers	Lyrics
"Happy New Year"	T. Rajendar, Hiphop Tamizha, Madonna Sebastian	Arunraja Kamaraj
"Oxygen"	Hiphop Tamizha, Sudarshan Ashok	Kabilan Vairamuthu
"Mathuraangalam"	Kaber Vasuki and Kids Chorus	Kabilan Vairamuthu
"Theeratha Vilayattu Pillai"	Hiphop Tamizha, Padmalatha, Anthony Daasan, Georgina Mathew	Subramania Bharati
"Boomerang"	Hiphop Tamizha, Nikhita Gandhi, Velmurugan	Kabilan Vairamuthu
"Vetri Meethu Vetri Vandhu – Reprised"	S. P. Balasubrahmanyam	Vaali

== Release ==
Kavan was released worldwide on 31 March 2017 alongside Dora. It had its world premiere in Dubai the day before. Kavan would release in a total of 624 screens, where 324 of the screens were in Tamil Nadu, 44 in Karnataka and 37 in Kerala. Overseas, the film released in more than 170 screens. The official trailer of the film was released on 11 March 2017 on YouTube, reaching 1 million views within a day.

=== Critical reception ===
The film received mostly positive reviews from critics. Writing for India Today, Srivatsan gave it a 3/5 and said that "Vijay Sethupathi shines in this media-bashing, media-glorifying film". Manoj Kumar R pf The Indian Express rated it 3/5 and said that it was "fun to watch". Sreedhar Pillai writing for Firstpost rated it a 3/5 and called it a "commercial entertainer, which keeps you hooked". Sify praised the film by calling it "a well-made commercial film that delivers a solid kick". M. Suganth from The Times of India gave it a 3/5 and said that it "keeps us engaged with its crowd-pleasing quality". In contrast, Gautaman Bhaskaran from Hindustan Times rated it 2/5 and called it "a film without focus, but Vijay Sethupathi shines, as usual". Baradwaj Rangan rated it 1/5 and called it "a 'satire' on the television industry", which "is overlong and laughably overblown".

=== Box office ===
The film had a strong opening at the box office collecting ₹101 million (equivalent to ₹150 million or US$1.6 million in 2026) on its opening weekend in Tamil Nadu alone, where ₹31 million (equivalent to ₹47 million or US$490,000 in 2026) was its opening day collection, increasing to a number of ₹42 million (equivalent to ₹64 million or US$670,000 in 2026) on its second day, with the help of positive word of mouth. In its second week, the film grossed ₹200 million (equivalent to ₹310 million or US$3.2 million in 2026) in Tamil Nadu alone within 10 days of its release, despite Kaatru Veliyidai releasing, it still held strong at the box office.

== Accolades ==
In early 2026, the Government of Tamil Nadu announced the Tamil Nadu State Film Awards for films released between 2016 and 2022. Kavan won in two categories: Best Supporting Actor (Bose Venkat) and Best Music Director (Hiphop Tamizha). Venkat's win caused scepticism among netizens, who speculated his closeness with the then ruling party, the Dravida Munnetra Kazhagam, enabled his victory.
