= D. R. K. Kiran =

Indian actor and art director

- Born: Vetrivelan; 1 January 1974 (age 52); Tondiarpet, Chennai
- Occupations: Film actor; Art Director
- Years active: 1992–present
- Notable work: Ko, Anegan, Irandam Ulagam, Beast, Doctor, Jailer, Many TV shows on Vijay Television & Sun Television
- Spouse: Uma Rani
- Children: Pranav, Tarun

D. R. K. Kiran is an Indian actor and art director who works primarily in Tamil cinema.

== Filmography ==
=== Actor ===
Year	Film	Role	Notes
1999	House Full	Journalist	uncredited role
2000	Uyirile Kalanthathu	College Student	
2009	Thiru Thiru Thuru Thuru	Inspector	
2011	Ko	Dina Anjal employee	
2013	Kutti Puli	Villager	
2014	Velaiyilla Pattathari	MLA	
2015	Anegan	Ranjith	
2015	Paayum Puli	Gangster	
2016	Vedhalam	Gangster	
2016	Kathakali	Thavachelvam	
2016	Kadhalum Kadandhu Pogum	Sampath	
2016	Thirunaal	Ganesh’s friend	
2017	Yaman	Councillor	
2017	Kavan	Inspector Bala	
2019	Kudimagan		
2019	Kaappaan	Vivek	
2020	Naan Sirithal	Perumal	
2022	Valimai	Ahmed	
2023	Varisu	Anthony	

=== Art Director ===
Year	Film	Notes
1999	Ooty	
2006	Cyanide	Kannada film
2007	Jagadam	Telugu film
2008	Ashoka	
2009	Vaamanan	
2009	Thiru Thiru Thuru Thuru	
2010	Kattradhu Kalavu	
2011	Mayakkam Enna	
2011	Ko	
2012	Muppozhudhum Un Karpanaigal	
2012	3	
2012	Podaa Podi	
2013	Irandaam Ulagam	
2015	Anegan	
2015	Naanum Rowdydhaan	
2016	Kathakali	
2017	Kavan	
2018	Thaanaa Serndha Koottam	
2019	Kuppathu Raja	
2019	Kaappaan	
2021	Doctor	
2022	Beast	
2022	Vezham	
2023	Ravanasura	Telugu film
2023	Jailer	
2025	Vaa Vaathiyaar	
2026	Jailer 2	
2026	Circle	Filming in progress

=== Television ===
Year	Program	Notes
2023	Cooku With Comali Season 4	5th Runner-Up
