= K. V. Anand =

Indian film director (1966–2021)

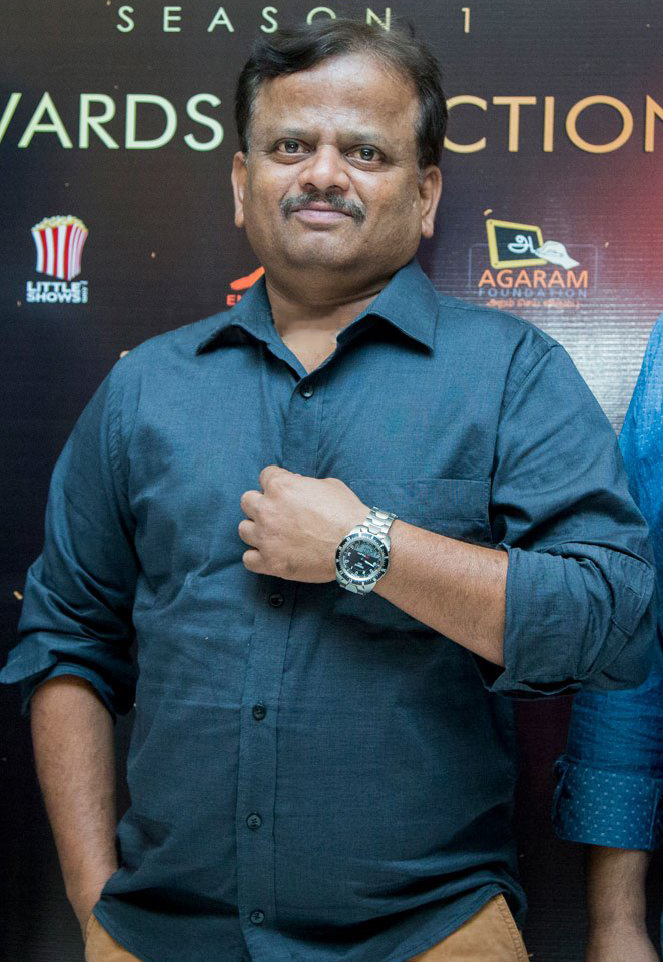
- Born: Karimanal Venkatesan Anand; 30 October 1966; Madras, Madras State, India
- Died: 30 April 2021 (aged 54); Chennai, Tamil Nadu, India
- Education: DG Vaishnav College, Arumbakkam, Chennai
- Occupations: Cinematographer, Film director, Writer, Photographer
- Years active: 1994–2021
- Spouse: Sasikala
- Awards: National Film Award for Best Cinematography (1994)

Karimanal Venkatesan Anand ISC (30 October 1966 – 30 April 2021) was an Indian cinematographer, film director and photojournalist, who worked mainly in the Tamil film industry. After a short period as a photojournalist, he became a cinematographer in the early 1990s, working on about fifteen films in the Southern and Hindi cinema industries. Anand won the National Film Award for Best Cinematography for his debut film as a cinematographer, Thenmavin Kombath. In 2005, Anand turned director with Kana Kandaen, and prioritised direction henceforth. He was a founding member of the Indian Society of Cinematographers (ISC).

== Early life ==
Anand was born in Chennai, in the state of Tamil Nadu in India on 30 October 1966. His childhood days were spent in Pulicat. He graduated with a bachelor's degree in Physics from DG Vaishnav College in June 1986, followed by a master's degree in Visual Communications from Loyola College, Chennai. During his college days Anand participated in annual trekking expeditions in the Himalayas. His exploratory trips to various remote locations in India triggered his passion for photography. Anand participated in inter-collegiate, state and national level photography contests. His visual images earned him numerous photography awards.

== Career ==
=== Photo journalist (1988–1992) ===
Anand worked as a freelance photo journalist for leading newspapers and magazines such as Kalki, India Today, Illustrated Weekly and Aside. Within a short period of time, his photos were published in more than 200 magazine covers and had taken photos of 10 Chief Ministers in close quarters. Anand continued to freelance in industrial photography, advertisements and cover pages for fictional Tamil novels.

=== Cinematographer (1994–2007) ===
Anand met cinematographer P. C. Sreeram and expressed his interest to work for him as an assistant. He joined him, serving as an apprentice for Sreeram's film such as Gopura Vasalile, Amaran, Meera, Thevar Magan and Thiruda Thiruda. He had initially joined as the sixth assistant to Sreeram when Jeeva, another prominent figure in cinematography was the first assistant to Sreeram. When director Priyadarshan had approached P. C. Sreeram to work on his Malayalam film, Thenmavin Kombath (1994), he was unavailable and thus recommended Anand to be given the opportunity. The film received positive reviews and Anand won the National Film Award for Best Cinematography for his debut venture, with the award committee noting he showed "outstanding cinematography executed with sincerity, imagination and flexibility". Anand's first Tamil film was the romantic drama Kadhal Desam (1996), which also won critical acclaim for showcasing Chennai in a futuristic mould. He also then teamed up with director Shankar for the production of the political thriller Mudhalvan (1999), winning appreciation for his experimental camera ramping and the general grandeur.

Anand has wielded the camera for 14 films in languages including Tamil, Telugu, Malayalam and Hindi. His final work as a cinematographer came with Sivaji (2007), the Rajinikanth-starrer directed by Shankar, the most expensive Tamil film ever made at the time of release.

=== Film director (2005–2019) ===
Anand turned a film director with Kana Kandaen (2005), a thriller film starring Prithviraj Sukumaran, Srikanth and Gopika. The film opened to favourable reviews from critics, with a reviewer from Rediff.com noting "Anand has succeeded in making an extremely watchable, highly thrilling film with a 'different' story". Despite the success of the film, Anand opted to return to cinematography to fulfil commitments for Rajinikanth's Sivaji (2007) directed by Shankar, which became the most expensive Tamil film ever made at the time.

Anand then collaborated with AVM Productions and Suriya in Ayan (2009), an action entertainer set on the backdrop of the Indo-African drug smuggling trade. In order to prepare the script, Anand did a lot of research and is said to have spoken to a lot of custom officers to understand the modus operandi of smuggling. The film opened in April 2009 to positive reviews, and became one of the year's highest-grossing Tamil language films. A critic from Rediff.com called the film a "must-watch" adding "what gets you by surprise is the thread of logic that laces practically every encounter, and the way Anand's screenplay covers all the angles". A reviewer from Sify.com stated "Anand pushes the commercial cinematic envelope and brings a savvy freshness in treatment and packaging hitherto unexplored in Ayan".

His third directorial venture, Ko (2011), narrated the tale of photojournalists caught up in a political corruption scandal. Starring Jiiva, Ajmal Ameer, Karthika Nair and Piaa Bajpai, the film also received a positive from film critics and the box office. A reviewer from The Hindu described the film as a "tale with a realistic twist" and mentioned that Anand "strikes gold with Ko". The critic added "blending the commercial with the realistic is a challenge, but Anand proves adept at it." Likewise, The Times of India noted "With Ko, director Anand gives notice of his immense talent once again, making a movie that is all set to lord over the box office this summer".

Anand worked with Suriya again in Maattrraan (2012), and was inspired to make the film after watching a documentary about the conjoined twins Chang and Eng Bunker. While preparing the script, he worked closely with a team of doctors to ensure the medical condition of open-heart transplant, as shown in the film, could be showcased as realistically as possible. He later made a mythical thriller film, Anegan (2015) starring Dhanush, and another political thriller film, Kavan (2017), with Vijay Sethupathi. His final film Kaappaan (2019), starring Mohanlal, Suriya and Arya told the tale of a Special Protection Group (SPG) officer who protects the Prime Minister.

== Craft, style, and technical collaborations ==
Anand collaborated with composer Harris Jayaraj, editor Anthony and the writer duo Subha for several of his ventures, describing them as "constant fixtures". While noting he shared a good rapport with Harris, he stated that Anthony was like his "alter ego" and "his biggest critic", with the pair often working closely during the post-production stages of films. He met the writer duo Suresh and Bala of Subha, during his stint as a photojournalist with India Today. Actor Jagan appeared in most of his films. Despite being a cinematographer himself, Anand chose not to photograph his directorial ventures and actively tried to select different cinematographers for each of his projects, although Soundararajan and Abhinandhan Ramanujam each worked with him on more than one project.

During the script-writing process, Anand often finished up to six drafts, though he rarely "lock[ed]" his scripts as they were always open to changes for improvisations on the shooting spot. He often rephrased dialogues, and sometimes invented titles during the drafting process, being constantly on the lookout for short and crisp titles. His film titles were usually in chaste Tamil, such as Kana Kandaen, Ayan, Ko, Anegan and Kavan.

=== Frequent collaborators ===
Collaborator	Kana Kandaen; (2004)	Ayan; (2009)	Ko; (2011)	Maattrraan; (2012)	Anegan; (2015)	Kavan; (2017)	Kaappaan; (2019)
Harris Jayaraj		Yes	Yes	Yes	Yes		Yes
Anthony		Yes	Yes	Yes	Yes	Yes	Yes
Subha	Yes	Yes	Yes	Yes	Yes	Yes	
Jagan		Yes	Yes		Yes	Yes	
D. R. K. Kiran			Yes		Yes	Yes	Yes
Suriya		Yes	Yes (cameo)	Yes			Yes
Peter Hein		Yes	Yes	Yes	Yes	Yes	Yes

== Death ==
Anand died in Chennai in the early hours of 30 April 2021 following a cardiac arrest. At the time, he had tested positive for COVID-19.

== Filmography ==
_{Source(s):}

Year	Film	Language	Cinematographer	Director	Actor	Role	Notes
1992	Meera	Tamil	No	No	Yes	Vikram's friend (uncredited)	
1994	Thenmavin Kombath	Malayalam	Yes	No	No		Debut film as a cinematographer National Film Award for Best Cinematography
1994	Minnaram	Malayalam	Yes	No	No		
1995	Punya Bhoomi Naa Desam	Telugu	Yes	No	No		
1996	Kadhal Desam	Tamil	Yes	No	No		
1997	Nerukku Ner	Tamil	Yes	No	No		
1998	Doli Saja Ke Rakhna	Hindi	Yes	No	No		
1999	Mudhalvan	Tamil	Yes	No	No		
2000	Josh	Hindi	Yes	No	No		
2001	Nayak: The Real Hero	Hindi	Yes	No	No		Remake of Mudhalvan
2002	Virumbugiren	Tamil	Yes	No	No		
2002	The Legend of Bhagat Singh	Hindi	Yes	No	No		
2003	Boys	Tamil	Yes	No	No		1 song only
2004	Khakee	Hindi	Yes	No	No		
2004	Ghilli	Tamil	Yes	No	No		1 song only
2004	Chellamae	Tamil	Yes	No	No		
2005	Kana Kandaen	Tamil	No	Yes	No		Debut film as a director
2007	Sivaji: The Boss	Tamil	Yes	No	Yes	Guest appearance	Final film as a cinematographer
2009	Ayan	Tamil	No	Yes	No		
2011	Ko	Tamil	No	Yes	No		
2012	Maattrraan	Tamil	No	Yes	Yes	Guest appearance	
2015	Anegan	Tamil	No	Yes	No		
2017	Kavan	Tamil	No	Yes	Yes	Tea seller	
2019	Kaappaan	Tamil	No	Yes	No		Final film as a director

== Awards ==
Year	Nominee / work	Award	Result	Ref.
1994	Thenmavin Kombath	National Film Award for Best Cinematography	Won	
1996	Kadhal Desam	Screen Award for Best Cinematography	Won	
2000	Josh	Screen Award for Best Cinematography	Won	
2002	The Legend of Bhagat Singh	SICA Award for Best Cinematography	Won	
2007	Sivaji	Filmfare Award for Best Cinematographer – Tamil	Won	
2009	Ayan	Filmfare Award for Best Director – Tamil	Nominated	
2011	Ko	Filmfare Award for Best Director – Tamil	Nominated	
2012	Maattrraan	SIIMA Award for Best Director	Nominated	

== Legacy ==
Cinematographers, Writers, and Directors such as S. Soundararajan, Richard M. Nathan, P. Chelladurai, Vijay Ulaganath, Deekay, R. M. Muthu Ganesan had worked as assistant, associate directors and assistant cinematographers under Anand.
