= Subha (writers) =

Collective pseudonym

- Born: D. Suresh, A. N. Balakrishnan
- Occupation: writers
- Years active: 1979-present

Subha is the name used by the writing partnership of D. Suresh and A. N. Balakrishnan, who write stories, detective novels and screenplays in Tamil.

== Work ==
The duo began co-authoring stories when they were in college together, and have been publishing their work since 1979. They have published more than 450 short novels and more than 400 short stories. Most of their detective novels feature the characters Narendran and Vaijayanthi of Eagle Eye Detective Agency, and their coworker John Sundar. Other characters created by Subha are Selva and Murugesan, who also feature in their detective stories, and John Sembaruthi, who is a character in some of Subha's novels set in the army. They wrote film reviews for the magazine Kalki under the pseudonym "Jayamanmadhan".

They have also written screenplays and dialogues for Tamil films and television serials. The movies Kana Kandaen and Ayan were based on their published novels and were scripted by Subha together with director K. V. Anand. They co-authored the script for Ko, a political thriller, and Maatraan, a thriller with K.V. Anand. The script for 180, a bilingual movie in Tamil and Telugu, was co-authored by Subha with director Jayendra. I (dialogues), Anegan, Yatchan, Thani Oruvan were co-authored by Subha.

Suresh and Balakrishnan run their own publishing company, Thanga Thaamarai Publications, which, in addition to their novels, brings out some non-fiction titles.

== Personal life ==
After college, Suresh and Balakrishnan both worked in banks, which they eventually quit in order to become full-time writers. They live with their families in adjacent apartments in Chennai.

== Bibliography ==
- Vaa Vennila
- Vettai Maan
- Sirikkum Penne
- Thudikkum Ithayam
- Bhoomikku Puthiyavan
- Aatta Nayagan
- Vetri Pathai
- Anbin Valimai
- Accha Maligai
- Therkku Roja
- Marakkatha Nenjam
- Puthirai Oru Punnagai
- Ennai Vittu Pogathe
- Bhoomiyil Maraithavan
- Anbudan Un Adimai
- Ithayathil Idam Kodu
- Oru Chinna Puyal
- Yuir Moochu
- Kalaiyatha
- Kanavu Rajjiyam
- Nettraya Nila
- Naayagi
- Naan Venduma
- Iraval Ithayam
- Achcham Thavir
- Ula Varum Nila
- Ithaya Vaasal
- En Peyar Aakash
- Ethirigale
- Anbulla Achchame
- Panimalaiyil
- Karuppu Seithi
- Kuttram Purinthavan
- Ulagai Vendravan
- Kurukku Pathai
- Bharathiyin Nithingale
- Tholaintha Pakkangal
- Ninaivil Oru Mayilliragu
- Yaaro Ivar Yaaro
- Kaatrodu Vaa
- Meniyellam Siragugal
- Kaatrodu Sila Kaladi Chuvadugal
- Nenjinile Oru Nesa Thee
- Neeyuma?
- Nee Nee Neemattume
- Innum Oru Kathali
- Iruthi Yaththirai
- Kadaisi Pournami
- Karuppu Kaatru
- Jeyuthu Konde Iruppen
- Theerpu Naal
- Nathikari Gnabagam
- Ethir Kaatru
- Aruge Oru Aabathu
- Thoondil kayiru
- Kathirukiren
- Oru Thuli Ratham
- Desathoroki

== Filmography ==
Year	Movie	Writer	Notes
1998	Naam Iruvar Namakku Iruvar	Dialogues	
2005	Kana Kandaen	Dialogues	
2005	Chanakya	Dialogues	
2006	Rendu	Screenplay	
2008	Inba	Dialogues	
2009	Ayan	Yes	
2011	Ko	Yes	Cameo
2011	Velayudham	Dialogues	
2011	Nootrenbadhu	Yes	
2012	Maatraan	Yes	
2013	Arrambam	Yes	
2015	I	Dialogues	
2015	Anegan	Yes	
2015	Yatchan	Yes	
2015	Thani Oruvan	Yes	
2017	Kavan	Yes	
2017	Velaikkaran	Yes	
2018	Naa Nuvve	Yes	Telugu film
2019	Action	Yes	

== See also ==
- List of Indian writers
