= Richa Gangopadhyay =

American actress

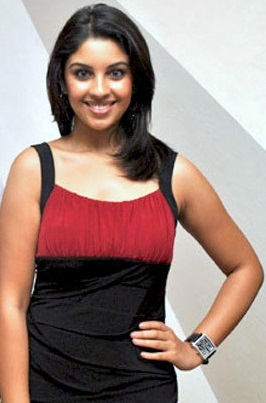
- Gangopadhyay in 2016
- Born: Antara Gangopadhyay; 20 March 1986 (age 40); New Delhi, India
- Other name: Richa Langella
- Education: MBA (Washington University in St. Louis); BS, Communications, Theatre Arts minor (Eastern Michigan University)
- Occupations: Actress, model
- Years active: 2009–2013
- Title: Miss India USA 2007
- Spouse: Joe Langella
- Children: 1

Richa Langella (née Antara Gangopadhyay; born 20 March 1986) is an Indian-American former actress and model who predominantly appeared in Telugu films. She presently resides at Portland, Oregon.

She was cast along with the prominent actors like Venkatesh Daggubati, Nagarjuna, Ravi Teja, Prabhas, Rana Daggubati, Dhanush, and Silambarasan.

Her notable films include Leader (2010) and she later worked on several commercially successful Telugu films such as Nagavalli (2010), Mirapakaay (2011), Sarocharu (2012), and Mirchi (2013).

== Early life ==
Richa Gangopadhyay was born on 20 March 1986, to a Bengali Brahmin family in New Delhi. Her family moved to the United States when she was only three.

Her father works as the Vice President of Netshape Technologies, while her mother works as a deputy director of the prestigious Institute of Museums and Library Services, having previously been nominated by President Obama to serve as a member of the IMLS Board. Her parents settled in the U.S. in 1989 after she spent her first year in Coimbatore, Tamil Nadu, and Gangopadhyay was raised in Pennsylvania and Michigan.

While attending Okemos High School, as a junior, she was featured in the local media for founding a youth-tutoring program for at-risk children in Lansing, which she ran for four years. She went on to major in Dietetics and Health Administration at Michigan State University but graduated with a Bachelor of Science in communications with a minor in Theatre Arts. After completing her undergraduate studies, she completed her master's degree in Business Administration from the Olin Business School at Washington University in St. Louis.

== Career ==
=== Early career and modeling (2005–08) ===
In August 2007, Gangopadhyay won the Miss India Michigan pageant and in December of that year, was crowned Miss India USA 2007 at the 26th annual Miss India USA pageant, held at Royal Albert's Palace in New Jersey. Gangopadhyay also secured the title of Miss Photogenic. She represented the U.S. in the 17th Annual Miss India Worldwide Pageant held in Johannesburg, and secured a place in the Top 10.

Gangopadhyay left the U.S. in 2008 for Mumbai, India to embark on a career in films. She subsequently graduated with a diploma in acting from Anupam Kher's acting school, Actor Prepares, and completed her portfolio, earning offers for fashion shows and modeling. In early 2009, Gangopadhyay featured in a commercial for Dabur Vatika Almond Hair Oil alongside Bollywood actress Preity Zinta, while also appearing in several print ads and TV commercials for Peter England People, Pepe Jeans, Malabar Gold and Kalaniketan.

=== Public recognition and success in films (2010–2013) ===
Gangopadhyay debuted with Rana Daggubati and Priya Anand in 2010 Telugu film Leader, produced by AVM Productions and directed by Sekhar Kammula. She was recommended to an assistant director of Leader, who in turn recommended her to Sekhar Kammula. Gangopadhyay went to Hyderabad to audition for the film on her birthday. She was selected instantly, and the shooting started 2 days later. In the film, she played the role of Archana, a news reporter, daughter of a politician and love interest of the title character, played by debutant Rana Daggubati. The film opened in theatres worldwide to positive reviews and did well commercially, with Gangopadhyay's performance described as "pretty and charming" and "good in a performance oriented role" by critics. After the success of the film, director P. Vasu signed her up to appear in Nagavalli, a sequel to his 2005 film Chandramukhi. The film featured an ensemble cast of Venkatesh, Anushka Shetty, Shraddha Das and Poonam Kaur. The film opened to mixed reviews, with Gangopadhyay's portrayal of a girl psychologically possessed by the ghost of Nagavalli, leading to critics dubbing her as "impressive" and "convincing".

Her first release in 2011 was the action film Mirapakaay, starring opposite Ravi Teja for the first time. She was signed after the director of the film, Harish Shankar, who had noticed her at the success party of her previous film Leader. He initially offered her the role played by Deeksha as she was an NRI, but when they met to review the script, he was convinced that Gangopadhyay would do justice to the character of Vinamra, a traditional Telugu Brahmin girl. The film opened to good reviews with Gangopadhyay's performance being described as "good and just about hold her own in the dance sequences" by critics. Gangopadhyay was next seen in two Tamil films; the first being Mayakkam Enna, a drama film featuring Dhanush and directed by Selvaraghavan, which earned her tremendous positive reviews and appreciation from all over. She then appeared alongside Silambarasan in Dharani's Osthe, the Tamil remake of the 2010 Hindi film Dabangg, winning critical acclaim for her role as Neduvaali. In 2012, she made her debut in Bengali, her mother tongue, through the film Bikram Singha : The Lion Is Back, opposite the prolific Prosenjit Chatterjee, a remake of the Telugu film Vikramarkudu. She also featured in the Telugu films Sarocharu, Mirchi and Bhai opposite actors Ravi Teja, Prabhas and Nagarjuna, which were released in 2012 and 2013.

== Personal life ==
In October 2013, she announced that she was taking a break from the film industry "for a while to finish up" her studies and move back to the United States to pursue her MBA and focus on her long-term career ambitions. She completed an MBA degree from Washington University in St. Louis in May 2017.

Gangopadhyay is married to her business school classmate Joe Langella. The couple have a son who was born in May 2021.

== Filmography ==
=== Film ===
Year	Title	Role(s)	Language
2010	Leader	Archana	Telugu
2010	Nagavalli	Gowri	Telugu
2011	Mirapakay	Panditharadhyula Vinamra	Telugu
2011	Mayakkam Enna	Yamini	Tamil
2011	Osthe	Neduvaali Velan	Tamil
2012	Bikram Singha	Madhu	Bengali
2012	Sarocharu	Vasudha	Telugu
2013	Mirchi	Maanasa	Telugu
2013	Bhai	Radhika	Telugu

== Awards ==
- 2012: Edison Award for Best Debut Actress – Mayakkam Enna
- 2012: Edison Award for Best Actress – Mayakkam Enna
- 2012: Norway Tamil Film Festival Award for Best Actress for Mayakkam Enna
