= Kana Kandaen =

- Poster
- Directed by: K. V. Anand
- Screenplay by: K. V. Anand
- Based on: Pudhaithaalum Varuven by Subha
- Produced by: P. L. Thenappan
- Starring: Srikanth; Gopika; Prithviraj
- Cinematography: Soundarrajan
- Edited by: V. T. Vijayan
- Music by: Vidyasagar
- Production company: Rajalakshmi Films International
- Release date: 13 May 2005
- Country: India
- Language: Tamil

Kana Kandaen (transl. I had a dream) is a 2005 Indian Tamil-language thriller film directed by K. V. Anand in his directorial debut, and produced by P. L. Thenappan. The film is based on Pudhaithaalum Varuven, a novel by Subha. It stars Srikanth, Gopika and Prithviraj. The music was composed by Vidyasagar with cinematography by Soundarrajan and editing by V. T. Vijayan. The film was released on 13 May 2005. It was dubbed into Telugu as Karthavyam.

== Plot ==
Bhaskar and Archana are childhood friends who grew up in the same village. Bhaskar receives a marriage invitation card from Archana. Only then does he realise his love for her, but he still decides to attend the marriage. The day before the marriage, Archana discovers that her fiancé is not a good man and decides to call off the wedding. Her mother helps her escape with Bhaskar. The couple begins to live in a small house owned by Sivaramakrishnan. Bhaskar, a research scholar in chemistry, succeeds in coming out with a prototype of a desalination plant which he wants to give to the government and solve a water crisis. He gets discouraged by the government authorities and State Minister. Because of this, he decides to set up his own desalination plant based on the methods of his research. Along with Archana, he runs from pillar to post for a loan. Bhaskar is hesitant to express his love towards Archana as she may misinterpret his intentions for helping her, but she soon realises his love for her.

Madhan, a wealthy money lender, is a college mate of Archana. He gets acquainted with their family. Coming to know of their troubles, Madhan volunteers to help them and lends money. However, Madhan is a '"business consultant" who lends money to companies, corporates, and individuals at exorbitant rates of interest and uses his might to recover them. In Bhaskar's case, he fakes the bond papers that Bhaskar has signed and begins to trouble them, demanding his money back and threatening to take over Bhaskar's research works with which he aspires to make a huge sum. When everything goes out of hand for Madhan, he sets a bomb in Bhaskar's research plant, but Bhaskar thwarts the plan. The video records that Bhaskar had recovered earlier from Madhan's office showing his cruel side was released to the press, and an arrest warrant was issued for him, in a final encounter with Bhaskar in his laboratory, Madhan try to shoot Bhaskar, but get electrocuted after he accidentally stepped down to the water pool carrying electricity (which occurs during the fight). The film ends with Bhaskar getting recognised for his research work, while Madhan was shown as a homeless pauper, after getting the electric shock.

== Cast ==
- Srikanth as Bhaskar
- Gopika as Archana
  - Swetha Bharathi as Young Archana
- Prithviraj as Madhan
- Vivek as Sivaramakrishnan
- Amita Rajan as Vasantha
- Vanitha Krishnachandran as Archana's mother
- Mayoori as Madhan's fake wife
- M. S. Bhaskar as Minister
- Singamuthu as Perumal
- Pondy Ravi as Durai
- Laxmi Rathan
- Geetha Lakshmi as Sivaramakrishnan's wife (uncredited)
- Linda Arsenio as an item girl

== Production ==
Noted cinematographer K. V. Anand made his directorial debut with this film. He initially wanted to direct a romance film and met the writer duo Subha to discuss this. However, after reading their novel Pudhaithaalum Varuven, he decided to adapt that instead and they agreed. Anand initially wanted Suriya to play the antagonist, but the actor declined as he preferred to play the protagonist. R. Madhavan too was unsuccessfully approached. The role went to Malayalam actor Prithviraj, making his Tamil debut. The film was launched at AVM Studios on 1 December 2004. The song "Kaalai Arumbi" was shot at Marakkanam beach near Mamallapuram while another song "Chinna Chinna Sigarangal" was shot at 300 feet stone quarry at Pallavaram.

== Soundtrack ==
The music is composed by Vidyasagar and lyrics were written by Vairamuthu.

Song title	Singers
"Kaalai Arumbi"	Srinivas, Kalyani
"Chinna Chinna"	Tippu, Sunitha Sarathy
"Chinna Ponnu"	Sayanora Philip
"Aiyya Ramaiah"	Udit Narayan
"Thai Sollum"	Manikka Vinayagam

== Critical reception ==
Shobha Warrier of Rediff.com gave the film a favourable review and wrote that "On the whole, K. V. Anand has made a very good romantic thriller". Malini Mannath of Chennai Online wrote, "Finally, K V Anand has proved that he's as good a director as he is a cinematographer. His film is a judicious blend of form and content, excitingly packaged into an eminently watchable thriller". Sify wrote, "On the downside the film is a bit lengthy in the second half and some loopholes in the story. Still Kana Kandein is a riveting thriller that is worth your time and money". Visual Dasan of Kalki wrote that the director keeps viewers on the edge of their seats till the end with compelling visuals, strong love, bright and fresh supporting characters that cannot be considered as outdated. Malathi Rangarajan of The Hindu wrote that "Relevant issues, plausible storyline, astute screenplay, deft direction and alluring camera work" make the film worth watching. G. Ulaganathan of Deccan Herald called the film entertaining and appreciated the acting of the star cast and Vidyasagar's music.
