= Cinema Veeran =

2017 documentary film

- Poster
- Directed by: Aishwarya Rajinikanth
- Written by: Aishwarya Rajinikanth
- Produced by: Dhanush
- Narrated by: Rajinikanth
- Cinematography: G. K. Vishnu
- Edited by: Ruben
- Music by: Score: A. R. Rahman; Qutub-E-Kripa
- Production company: Wunderbar Films
- Distributed by: Hotstar
- Release date: 21 June 2017
- Running time: 51 minutes
- Country: India
- Language: Tamil

Cinema Veeran (transl. Cinema's braveheart) is a 2017 Indian Tamil-language documentary film written and directed by Aishwarya Rajinikanth on her documentary film debut.

== Production ==
The plot of the film was inspired and based on the lives of untold stories of stunt choreographers of Tamil cinema. The film also features a voice-over provided by Rajinikanth and it is produced by Dhanush under the production banner Wunderbar Films. The principal photography began in late December 2015 and the first look poster was unveiled in February 2016.

== Release ==
It was released OTT, through Hotstar on 21 June 2017.

== Reception ==
Hemanth Kumar of Firstpost wrote "Cinema Veeran leaves you choked with emotion and it also makes a strong case for providing better facilities to stuntmen, who fiddle with danger on a daily basis".
