= Dhanush =

Indian actor and filmmaker (born 1983)

- Dhanush in 2020
- Born: Venkatesh Prabhu Kasthuri Raja; 28 July 1983 (age 43); Madras, Tamil Nadu, India
- Occupations: Actor; director; producer; playback singer; lyricist
- Years active: 2002–present
- Works: Full list
- Spouse: Aishwarya Rajinikanth (m. 2004; div. 2024)
- Children: 2
- Family: Kasthuri Raja family
- Awards: Full list

Venkatesh Prabhu Kasthuri Raja (born 28 July 1983), known professionally as Dhanush, is an Indian actor, filmmaker, lyricist and playback singer who works primarily in Tamil films, as well as few Hindi and Telugu films. Having starred in 50 films over his career, his accolades include six National Film Awards, two Tamil Nadu State Film Awards, fourteen SIIMA Awards, eight Filmfare Awards South and a Filmfare Award. One of the highest paid actors in Tamil cinema, he has been included in the Forbes India Celebrity 100 list six times.

Dhanush's debut film was Thulluvadho Ilamai, a 2002 coming-of-age film directed by his father, Kasthuri Raja. He achieved further success in Polladhavan (2007) and Yaaradi Nee Mohini (2008), both of which were critically acclaimed and commercially successful. His role as a rooster fight jockey in Aadukalam (2010) won him the National Film Award for Best Actor and the Filmfare Award for Best Actor – Tamil. He continued success with films, including Maryan (2013), Velaiilla Pattadhari (2014), Anegan (2015), Maari (2015), Kodi (2016), Vada Chennai (2018), Asuran (2019), Thiruchitrambalam (2022), Vaathi (2023) and Raayan (2024), the lattermost of which emerged as his highest-grossing release. Dhanush won his second National Film Award for Best Actor for Asuran (2019).

In 2011, Dhanush's popular song "Why This Kolaveri Di" from the romantic psychological thriller film 3 (2012) became the first Indian music video to cross 100 million views on YouTube. He made his Hindi film debut with Aanand L. Rai's Raanjhanaa (2013). His performance as an obsessive one-sided lover in the film won him the Filmfare Award for Best Male Debut in addition to a nomination for the Filmfare Award for Best Actor. Dhanush produces films through his production company, Wunderbar Films, and made his directorial debut with Pa. Pandi (2017). His song "Rowdy Baby" from Maari 2 became one of the most-viewed Indian songs of all time. It is the first South Indian video song to reach one billion views on YouTube.

== Early life ==
Dhanush was born as Venkatesh Prabhu Kasthuri Raja on 28 July 1983 to Tamil film director and producer, Kasthuri Raja, and his wife, Vijayalakshmi, in Madras, Tamil Nadu. Initially he wished to study Hotel Management and become a chef. However his elder brother, film director Selvaraghavan, pressured him to become an actor. Dhanush also has two sisters named Vimalageetha and Karthiga Karthik.

== Acting career ==
=== 2002–2010: Career beginnings ===
Venkatesh Prabhu adopted the stage name, "Dhanush", after being inspired by the fictional covert operation from Kuruthipunal (1995). He debuted in the 2002 teen drama film Thulluvadho Ilamai, directed by his father Kasthuri Raja, which became a sleeper hit. He then appeared in his brother Selvaraghavan's first directorial venture, the romantic psychological thriller Kaadhal Kondein in 2003. The film portrayed Dhanush as a mentally-disturbed youth, Vinodh, who yearned for the love of his friend, eventually turning possessive of her. Upon release, the film opened to critical acclaim and proved to be a major commercial success, eventually becoming Dhanush's breakthrough in Tamil cinema. The film also fetched him his first nomination for the Filmfare Award for Best Actor – Tamil. His next film was the romantic comedy Thiruda Thirudi (2003), a critical and commercial success.

In 2004, Dhanush appeared in Pudhukottaiyilirundhu Saravanan and Sullan. Later, he also appeared in Dreams, another film panned by critics. The film was directed by his father, like their previous ventures. In 2005, Dhanush appeared in Devathaiyai Kanden and in the same year, he also worked on Balu Mahendra's Adhu Oru Kana Kaalam. Though it was a commercial disaster at the box office, Dhanush has repeatedly stated that he started taking acting seriously only after working with Mahendra.

In 2006, he reunited with his brother for the cult gangster film, Pudhupettai. It portrayed a young man's journey from a street urchin to gangster, receiving mixed reviews, initially, though Dhanush's performance received major praise and he subsequently received his second nomination for the Filmfare Award for Best Actor – Tamil. However, over the years, the film has undergone a critical re-evaluation and is now considered to be one of the greatest Tamil films ever made, whilst also garnering a huge cult following. That same year, he also reunited with Boopathy Pandian after Devathaiyai Kanden, for the romantic comedy, Thiruvilaiyaadal Aarambam, opposite Shriya Saran and Prakash Raj. A critic from Sify stated, "Dhanush as the hyperactive Thiru is simply superb and his ability to deliver funny lines casually is uncommendable." It was a major commercial success, a first for Dhanush, after several average and below-average grossers.

Dhanush's first release of 2007, Parattai Engira Azhagu Sundaram did not do well at the box office. The film was a remake of the successful Kannada language film Jogi (2005). However, his second film Polladhavan was released during Diwali 2007. Polladhavan was based on the 1948–Italian neorealist film Bicycle Thieves and Dhanush's performance was appreciated.

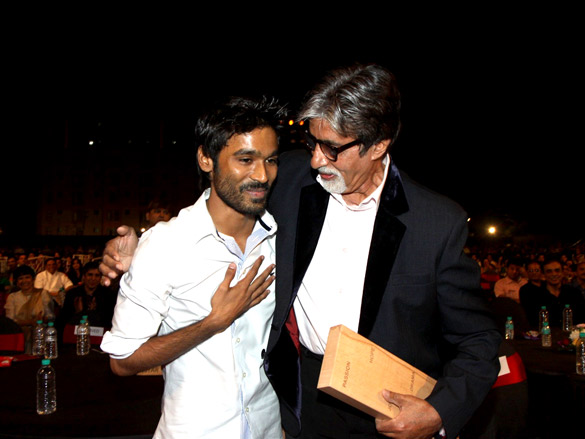
Dhanush with Amitabh Bachchan at the BIG Star Entertainment Awards in 2012

The following year, the remake of a Telugu film directed by his brother formed the plot line for Dhanush's next film directed by debutant Mithran Jawahar, later titled Yaaradi Nee Mohini opposite Nayanthara. The romantic comedy proved to be a major critical and commercial success, thus earning Dhanush his third nomination for the Filmfare Award for Best Actor – Tamil. He later appeared in a cameo appearance, for his father-in-law Rajinikanth's venture Kuselan. His subsequent venture was Suraj's Padikathavan, which was released in January 2009. His performance was praised and well received. The film was a box office success and established Dhanush as a bankable star. His next two films Kutty and Uthama Puthiran opposite Genelia D'Souza, were both collaborations with director Mithran Jawahar. The latter emerged a box office success. The song "Un Mele Aasaidhaan" from the action-adventure film Aayirathil Oruvan, which featured him alongside his then wife Aishwarya Rajinikanth, won him his first Filmfare Award for Best Male Playback Singer – Tamil.

=== 2011–2015: Established actor and critical acclaim ===
Dhanush's first release in 2011, which he had shot for over three years, was Aadukalam opposite Taapsee Pannu, marking his second collaboration with Vetrimaran. Dhanush played the role of a local cockfighter and described the venture as his "dream project" during production. The film gained widespread critical acclaim and won six awards at the 58th National Film Awards, with Dhanush receiving the National Film Award for Best Actor, He also won his first Filmfare Award for Best Actor – Tamil for his performance. The film was a commercial success at the box office. Pavithra Srinivasan of Rediff.com called it "one of Dhanush's best works to date" and added, "Dhanush acts wonderfully. He's excellent, especially in the throes of love and betrayal." Dhanush appeared in an extended guest appearance in Subramania Siva's Seedan. His next two ventures were the action films, Mappillai, a remake of his father-in-law's same-titled 1989 film and Venghai, by Hari, which received mixed reviews but was a commercial success. Dhanush's next film, Mayakkam Enna, in which he once again collaborated with his brother. He played a photographer opposite Richa Gangopadhyay. The film received positive reviews and was a moderate success.

Dhanush's career marked a turning point with his only release in 2012, the romantic psychological thriller 3, directed by his then wife, Aishwarya and produced by him. He played a bipolar disorder patient opposite Shruti Haasan. The film emerged as a critical and commercial success, majorly due to the popularity of the song "Why This Kolaveri Di". The song quickly became viral, the first video from India to gain 100 million YouTube views. The film won him his second consecutive Filmfare Award for Best Actor – Tamil and his second Filmfare Award for Best Male Playback Singer – Tamil. L Romal M Singh of DNA India noted, "Dhanush is amazing! The man only surpasses his previous films and the actor has far outdone his previous attempt at such a role."

Dhanush first two releases in 2013 saw him appear in cameo roles in the Malayalam film Proprietors: Kammath & Kammath and the Tamil film Ethir Neechal. He then appeared in Maryan opposite Parvathy, which emerged as an above-average grosser at the box office, but was critically acclaimed, thus earning Dhanush his sixth nomination for the Filmfare Award for Best Actor – Tamil, in addition to fetching him the Filmfare Award for Best Actor (Critics) – Tamil. His next release that year was Naiyaandi opposite Nazriya Nazim, directed by A. Sarkunam, which did not make any notable impact at the box office. Dhanush expanded to Hindi films with Raanjhanaa, directed by Aanand L.Rai. He played a Tamil Hindu boy who is in love with a Muslim girl (played by Sonam Kapoor). The film was released on 21 June 2013 with the Tamil dubbed version Ambikapathy releasing a week later. It grossed over ₹105 crore worldwide, becoming a commercial success and one of the highest grossing film of the year. Taran Adarsh noted, "Dhanush, who makes his Hindi film debut, is simply outstanding. To state that he's the mainstay of the film would be most appropriate." Sukanya Verma praised him for being "wonderful, tangible and indefatigable". His performance earned him the Filmfare Award for Best Male Debut.

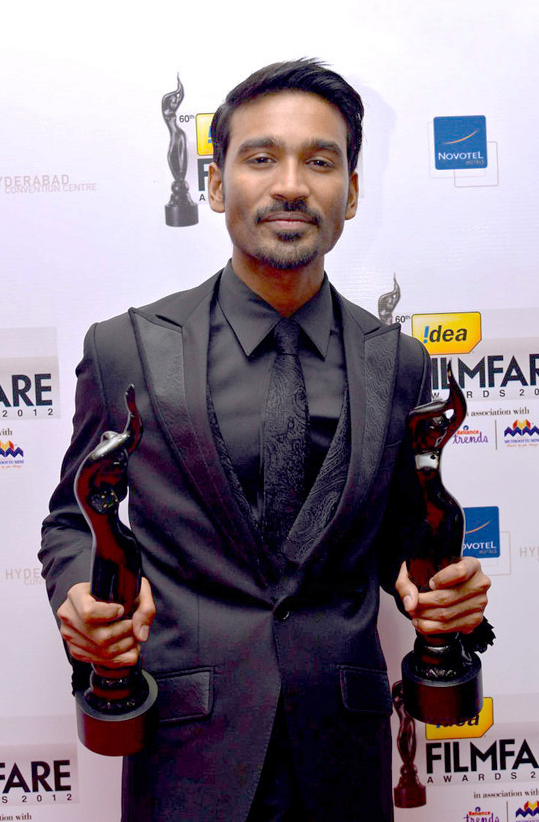
Dhanush at 60th South Filmfare Awards 2013

Dhanush's sole film of 2014 was the comedy-drama Velaiilla Pattadhari opposite Amala Paul, which was also his 25th film and was directed by Velraj. It received positive reviews from critics and was a commercial success, ranking among the highest-grossing Tamil films of 2014. Dhanush won his third Filmfare Award for Best Actor – Tamil for his performance in the film. The Telugu dubbed version, Raghuvaran B. Tech, was also a success. Baradwaj Rangan stated: "Dhanush gets a film where he gets to showcase both sides ... [Velraj has] given actor-Dhanush fans half a movie to love, and he's handed over the rest to the star-Dhanush fans. Is there much use complaining when both actor and star are in such fine form?"

In 2015, his first release was Shamitabh, which was also his second Hindi film, directed by R. Balki. It opened to highly positive reviews and was praised for the concept, but failed at the box office. His next film was Anegan, a psychological thriller directed by K. V. Anand. He played four characters in different eras opposite Amyra Dastur. The film received positive reviews and became a box office success. The film earned Dhanush his eighth nomination for the Filmfare Award for Best Actor – Tamil. Dhanush then played a local gangster opposite Kajal Aggarwal in Maari. The film was a critical and commercial success. In Thanga Magan, Dhanush played a man struggling for job opposite Samantha Ruth Prabhu. Despite positive reviews, it failed at the box office.

=== 2016–present: Commercial success and progression ===
In 2016, Dhanush appeared Thodari opposite Keerthy Suresh, which was an action thriller film set on a train. The film was a moderate success at the box office. In his next release Kodi, a political action thriller, Dhanush played dual roles of a politician and his apolitical twin brother opposite Trisha and Anupama Parameswaran. The film earned him his ninth nomination for the Filmfare Award for Best Actor – Tamil. The film was a commercial success. Sreedhar Pillai, noted, "The film is quite racy as Dhanush carries the show and is there in almost all frames." In 2017, Dhanush made his directorial debut Power Paandi. He also played the younger version of the lead character opposite Madonna Sebastian. It was a box office success and received critical acclaim. Velaiilla Pattadhari 2, directed by his sister-in-law Soundarya Rajinikanth, saw him reprised his character from the prequel. It was one of the highest-grossing Tamil films of the year.

His films Vadachennai and Maari 2, a sequel to Maari, were released in 2018. Vadachennai was highly praised by critics and emerged as the highest-grossing A-rated Tamil film of all time. For his performance in the film, Dhanush also jointly won the Filmfare Award for Best Actor – Tamil (tying with Vijay Sethupathi for '96), his fourth win in the category. Maari 2 received mixed reviews upon release and was a moderate success at the box office. Dhanush's first international film, titled The Extraordinary Journey of the Fakir, released in 2019 worldwide and was a commercial failure. His next 2019 release, Asuran, was praised by critics for its gritty portrayal of land and caste violence and became a box office success, entering the 100 Crore Club for grossing ₹100 crore within a month of its release. Asuran won Dhanush his second National Film Award for Best Actor. His next release, a romantic thriller titled Enai Noki Paayum Thota was released on 29 November 2019 after several delays due to financial problems and it received mixed reviews upon release.

Dhanush's first 2020 release, on Pongal, was the martial arts action film Pattas, directed by R. S. Durai Senthilkumar, in which he played a double role. The film received positive reviews. Dhanush joined the ensemble cast of Chris Evans, Ryan Gosling and Ana de Armas in Russo brothers Netflix produced film The Gray Man.

Dhanush's first 2021 role was his starring role in Karnan, directed by Mari Selvaraj, and featuring Lal, Natty Subramaniam, Yogi Babu, Rajisha Vijayan, Gouri Kishan, Lakshmi Priyaa Chandramouli alongside him. The film released on 9 April, to critical acclaim. For his performance in the film, Dhanush received his eleventh nomination for the Filmfare Award for Best Actor – Tamil. His next project was the black comedy gangster film, Jagame Thandhiram, written and directed by Karthik Subbaraj, which released on 18 June 2021. It also featured Joju George (in his Tamil debut), Aishwarya Lekshmi (in her Tamil debut), and James Cosmo (in his Tamil debut). It received mixed-to-positive reviews from critics. He also starred in Aanand L. Rai's August 2021 Hindi-language film Atrangi Re, co-starring Akshay Kumar and Sara Ali Khan.

In 2022, Dhanush starred in Thiruchitrambalam, directed by Mithran Jawahar, and featuring Nithya Menen, Priya Bhavani Shankar, Rashi Kanna, Bharathiraja, Prakash Raj, Munishkanth, all alongside Dhanush. The film released on 18 August 2022, in theatres. It went onto become the highest-grossing film in his career.

Dhanush is set to appear in Aanand L. Rai's film Tere Ishk Mein, a spiritual successor to Raanjhanaa. He is set to play former Indian president A. P. J. Abdul Kalam in his biopic Kalam: The Missile Man of India which was announced at Cannes Film Festival, 2025.

== Personal life ==
Dhanush married Aishwarya, actor Rajinikanth's elder daughter on 18 November 2004. They have two sons, Yatra and Linga, who were born in 2006 and 2010 respectively. The couple announced their separation on 17 January 2022, and divorced on November 27, 2024.

Dhanush is an ardent devotee of the Hindu god Shiva and has given his two sons Shaivite names. A vegetarian, he has experimented with various cooking styles since childhood, and said he would have become a chef if not an actor.

== Music career ==
Dhanush is a singer, generally for his own films. As a lyricist, he is often credited as "Poet-u Dhanush" (Tanglish slang). He was introduced as a playback singer in Pudhukottaiyilirundhu Saravanan, by its composer Yuvan Shankar Raja and collaborated again with him in his brother Selvaraghavan's directorial, Pudhupettai. He sang further numbers in Selvaraghavan's films Aayirathil Oruvan and Mayakkam Enna; the former, which featured him alongside his then wife Aishwarya Rajinikanth.

"Why This Kolaveri Di" was released on YouTube in 2011 as part of the soundtrack to the film 3, the directorial debut of Aishwarya Dhanush. The song became the most-searched video in India. Anirudh Ravichander was the soundtrack composer for the film and Dhanush wrote much of the lyrics. He has also sung "No Problem" in the Kannada film Vajrakaya, which earned him a nomination for the Filmfare Award for Best Male Playback Singer – Kannada, and "Thikka" in the Telugu film Thikka.

== Other works ==
Dhanush has been associated with a number of causes. He worked with WWF India to support Earth Hour in 2012. Dhanush donated Rs.5 lakh for the 2015 South India floods rain-affected people. In 2017, he donated Rs. 50,000 to the families of 125 farmers that committed suicide. In August 2013, Dhanush was signed by Perfetti India Ltd. as their brand ambassador for Center Fresh chewing gum.

=== Wunderbar Films ===
In 2010, Dhanush and his wife Aishwarya founded the production and distribution company Wunderbar Films. They have produced several films under the company and Dhanush himself acted in many of the productions films such as 3 (their first work), Velaiilla Pattadhari, Shamitabh, Maari, Thanga Magan, Velaiilla Pattadhari 2, Vada Chennai and Maari 2. For Kaaka Muttai and Visaranai, he won the National Film Award, as a producer.

Dhanush made his directorial debut with the comedy-drama film Pa. Pandi (2017), which earned him his first nomination for Filmfare Award for Best Director – Tamil award.

== Public image and reception ==
Media discussions regarding Dhanush's potential entry into politics emerged following his speeches on community welfare and the rebranding of his fan club as the Dhanush Welfare Movement with a new flag. While his current focus is stated to be on cinema, a political analyst has noted that his screen image and Gavara Naidu community background could influence his future political prospects. However, certain Tamil nationalist groups have questioned his Tamil identity, citing his Telugu ancestry.

== Controversies ==
On 16 November 2024, Nayanthara penned a letter and published an Instagram post addressing Dhanush, where Nayanthara accused Dhanush of intentionally holding onto personal grudges and vengeance over the romantic relationship that unfolded between her and Vignesh Shivan during the shooting of Naanum Rowdy Dhaan, a film produced by Dhanush.

Nayanthara insisted that Dhanush had sent her a legal notice asking for a compensation of 10 crores for a 3-second video that was used in the Netflix documentary film Nayanthara: Beyond the Fairytale which were deemed as the behind-the-scenes recordings from the movie sets of Naanum Rowdy Dhaan. Nayanthara in her letter revealed that she apparently waited for nearly two years to claim the copyrighted material under the policy of a no objection certificate from her producer Dhanush in order to freely use it for her documentary. She revealed that the filmmakers had apparently re-edited and trimmed the documentary while removing the 3-second video sequence which had been shot from the shooting spots of Naanum Rowdy Dhaan as Dhanush did not grant permission for the usage of songs or visual cuts which featured in Naanum Rowdy Dhaan.

== In the media ==
Dhanush is among the highest paid actors in Tamil cinema. Dhanush was included in the Forbes India Celebrity 100 list which is based on the earnings of Indian celebrities from 2014 to 2019. His peak ranking on the list was at the 37th place, in the year 2015. He stood at the 13th place in its list of the most influential stars on Instagram in South cinema for the year 2021. Rediff.com named Dhanush the "Best Tamil Actor" of 2011. His performance in Maryan and Raanjhanaa is regarded as one of the "100 Greatest Performances of the Decade" by Film Companion. Dhanush became the 8th and 9th most tweeted about South Indian actor in 2020 and 2021, respectively. In 2024, he was placed 30th on IMDb's List of 100 Most Viewed Indian Stars.

== Discography ==
- Note: (D) indicates dubbing.

List of vocals by Dhanush
Year	Title	Album	Composer	Language	Notes
2004	"Naattu Sarakku"	Pudhukottaiyilirundhu Saravanan	Yuvan Shankar Raja	Tamil	
2005	"Thunda Kaanom"	Devathaiyai Kanden	Deva	Tamil	
2006	"Enga Area"	Pudhupettai	Yuvan Shankar Raja	Tamil	
2010	"Un Mele"	Aayirathil Oruvan	G. V. Prakash Kumar	Tamil	
2010	"Neemeede Aasaga"	Aayirathil Oruvan	G. V. Prakash Kumar	Tamil	
2011	"Voda Voda Dhooram Korayala"	Mayakkam Enna	G. V. Prakash Kumar	Tamil	
2011	"Kadhal En Kadhal"	Mayakkam Enna	G. V. Prakash Kumar	Tamil	
2012	"Why This Kolaveri Di"	3	Anirudh Ravichander	Tamil	
2012	"Kannazhaga"	3	Anirudh Ravichander	Tamil	
2012	"Kannuladha" (D)	3	Anirudh Ravichander	Telugu	Dubbed version
2012	"Sachin Anthem"	—N/a	Anirudh Ravichander	Tamil	Non-album single
2012	"Tata Nano"	—N/a	Anirudh Ravichander	Hindi	Non-album single
2013	"Nijamellam Maranthu Pochu"	Ethir Neechal	Anirudh Ravichander	Tamil	
2013	"Teddy Bear"	Naiyaandi	Ghibran	Tamil	
2014	"Amma Amma"	Velaiilla Pattadhari	Anirudh Ravichander	Tamil	
2014	"Po Indru Neeyaga"	Velaiilla Pattadhari	Anirudh Ravichander	Tamil	
2014	"What a Karavad"	Velaiilla Pattadhari	Anirudh Ravichander	Tamil	
2015	"Danga Maari"	Anegan	Harris Jayaraj	Tamil	
2015	"No Problem"	Vajrakaya	Arjun Janya	Kannada	
2015	"Pazhankala"	Irandaam Ulagam	Harris Jayaraj	Tamil	
2015	"Oh Oh"	Thanga Magan	Anirudh Ravichander	Tamil	
2015	"Jodi Nilave"	Thanga Magan	Anirudh Ravichander	Tamil	
2015	"Manasa Manasa"	Nava Manmadhudu (D)	Anirudh Ravichander	Telugu	Dubbed version
2015	"Odini Lali"	Nava Manmadhudu (D)	Anirudh Ravichander	Telugu	Dubbed version
2015	"Maari Thara Local"	Maari	Anirudh Ravichander	Tamil	
2015	"Thappa Dhaan Theriyum"	Maari	Anirudh Ravichander	Tamil	
2015	"Bagulu Odayam Dagulu Mari"	Maari	Anirudh Ravichander	Tamil	
2016	"Maalai Varum Vannilla"	Nenjam Marappathillai	Yuvan Shankar Raja	Tamil	
2016	"Kodi"	Kodi	Santhosh Narayanan	Tamil	
2016	"Thikka"	Thikka	S. Thaman	Telugu	
2017	"Solli Tholaiyen Ma"	Yaakkai	Yuvan Shankar Raja	Tamil	
2017	"Soorakathu"	Pa. Pandi	Sean Roldan	Tamil	
2017	"Pudavai Nilave"	Yaadhumagi Nindraai	Ashwin Vinayagamoorthy	Tamil	
2017	"Life of Raghuvaran"	Velaiilla Pattadhari 2	Sean Roldan	Tamil	
2017	"Torture of Raghuvaran"	Velaiilla Pattadhari 2	Sean Roldan	Tamil	
2017	"Raghuvaran Vs Vasundhara"	Velaiilla Pattadhari 2	Sean Roldan	Tamil	
2018	"Goindhammavala"	Vada Chennai	Santhosh Narayanan	Tamil	
2018	"Engleesu Lovesu"	Pakkiri (D)	Amit Trivedi	Tamil	Dubbed version
2018	"Local Sarakka"	Padaiveeran	Karthik Raja	Tamil	
2018	"Ezhava"	Ezhumin	Ganesh Chandrasekaran	Tamil	
2018	"Maari Gethu"	Maari 2	Yuvan Shankar Raja	Tamil	
2018	"Rowdy Baby"	Maari 2	Yuvan Shankar Raja	Tamil	
2018	"Rowdy Baby" (D)	Maari 2	Yuvan Shankar Raja	Telugu	Dubbed version
2019	"Nenjodu Vinaa"	Brother's Day	4 Musics	Tamil	Malayalam film
2019	"Polladha Bhoomi"	Asuran	G. V. Prakash Kumar	Tamil	
2019	"Kannazhagu Rathiname"	Asuran	G. V. Prakash Kumar	Tamil	
2020	"Chill Bro"	Pattas	Vivek–Mervin	Tamil	
2020	"Kaathodu Kaathanen"	Jail	G. V. Prakash Kumar	Tamil	
2021	"Thattaan Thattaan"	Karnan	Santhosh Narayanan	Tamil	
2021	"Tata Bye Bye"	Vanakkam Da Mappilei	G. V. Prakash Kumar	Tamil	
2021	"Nethu"	Jagame Thandhiram	Santhosh Narayanan	Tamil	
2021	"Rakita Rakita Rakita"	Jagame Thandhiram	Santhosh Narayanan	Tamil	
2021	"Little Little"	Atrangi Re	A. R. Rahman	Hindi	
2021	"Little Little"	Galatta Kalyaanam (D)	A. R. Rahman	Tamil	Dubbed version
2022	"Polladha Ulagam"	Maaran	G. V. Prakash Kumar	Tamil	
2022	"Chittu Kuruvi"	Maaran	G. V. Prakash Kumar	Tamil	
2022	"Thaai Kelavi"	Thiruchitrambalam	Anirudh Ravichander	Tamil	
2022	"Megham Karukaatha"	Thiruchitrambalam	Anirudh Ravichander	Tamil	
2022	"Mayakkama Kalakkama"	Thiruchitrambalam	Anirudh Ravichander	Tamil	
2023	"Onnoda Nadandhaa"	Viduthalai Part 1	Ilaiyaraaja	Tamil	
2023	"Vaa Vaathi (Reprise)"	Vaathi	G. V. Prakash Kumar	Tamil	
2023	"Mastaaru Mastaaru (Reprise)"	Sir	G. V. Prakash Kumar	Telugu	
2023	"Hathavidi"	Miss Shetty Mr Polishetty	Radhan	Telugu	
2023	"Yennadaa Nadakkudhu" (D)	Miss Shetty Mr Polishetty	Radhan	Tamil	Dubbed version
2024	"Adangaatha Asuran"	Raayan	A. R. Rahman	Tamil	
2024	"Aalathey"	Nanban Oruvan Vantha Piragu	AH Kaashif	Tamil	
2024	"Golden Sparrow"	Nilavuku En Mel Ennadi Kobam	G. V. Prakash Kumar	Tamil	
2024	"Kadhal Fail"	Nilavuku En Mel Ennadi Kobam	G. V. Prakash Kumar	Tamil	
2024	"Yedi"	Nilavuku En Mel Ennadi Kobam	G. V. Prakash Kumar	Tamil	
2025	"Pulla (Reprise)"	Nilavuku En Mel Ennadi Kobam	G. V. Prakash Kumar	Tamil	
2025	"Poyiraa Mama"	Kuberaa	Devi Sri Prasad	Telugu	
2025	"Poyivaa Nanba"	Kuberaa	Devi Sri Prasad	Tamil	
2025	"Trance of Kuberaa"	Kuberaa	Devi Sri Prasad	Telugu	
2025	"Trance of Kuberaa"	Kuberaa	Devi Sri Prasad	Tamil	
2025	"Maadi Maadi"	Kuberaa	Devi Sri Prasad	Telugu	
2025	"Yamathu Yamathu"	Kuberaa	Devi Sri Prasad	Tamil	
2025	"Enna Sugam"	Idli Kadai	G. V. Prakash Kumar	Tamil	
2025	"Enjaami Thandhaane"	Idli Kadai	G. V. Prakash Kumar	Tamil	
2025	"Kannamma"	Retta Thala	Sam C. S.	Tamil	
2026	"Vaama Vaama"	Idhayam Murali	Thaman S	Tamil	

== Accolades ==
Dhanush has won six National Film Awards including two Best Actor awards for Aadukalam and Asuran, and a Special Mention (Best Actor) for Captain Miller. Additionally he has won eight Filmfare Awards South including four Best Actor – Tamil award for Aadukalam, 3, Velaiyilla Pattathari and Vada Chennai.
