= Thanga Magan (2015 film) =

2015 Indian film by Velraj

- Theatrical release poster
- Directed by: R. Velraj
- Written by: R. Velraj
- Produced by: Dhanush; G. N. Anbu Chezhiyan
- Starring: Dhanush; Samantha Ruth Prabhu; Amy Jackson
- Cinematography: A. Kumaran
- Edited by: Rajesh Kumar
- Music by: Anirudh Ravichander
- Production companies: Wunderbar Films; Gopuram Films
- Distributed by: Sri Green Productions
- Release date: 18 December 2015
- Running time: 121 minutes
- Country: India
- Language: Tamil

Thanga Magan (transl. Golden Son) is a 2015 Indian Tamil-language action drama film written and directed by R. Velraj. Dhanush produced the film and stars alongside Samantha Ruth Prabhu and Amy Jackson, while K. S. Ravikumar and Radhika Sarathkumar play supporting roles. It follows a man whose peaceful life is disrupted by his father's suicide, prompting him to investigate.

The film was announced in December 2014. Filming took place between March and October 2015, with the film remaining untitled until after completion. The music was composed by Anirudh Ravichander. It was released on 18 December 2015 and became a box office failure.

== Plot ==
Tamizh, his wife Yamuna, and his mother move into an uncomfortable home. Tamizh leaves them with his friend Kumaran while he looks for a job. All the companies are pleased with his resume, but are hesitant to offer him a job due to incidents in his past employment. Desperate, Tamizh gets a job at a roadside biriyani shop. He comes home for the night after he gets drunk, and a flashback starts.

Five years earlier, college student Tamizh, Kumaran, and Tamizh's cousin Aravind were inseparable friends. One day, Tamizh's mother tells him to go to the temple for a pooja. There, he meets Hema, an Anglo-Indian architecture student, and likes her. Tamizh and Kumaran leave out Aravind as they feel that, due to his better looks, he might hinder their attempts at the girls. Tamizh starts wooing her, and the two eventually fall in love, while Kumaran and Tamizh's neighbour Revathi also fall in love. For their first anniversary, Tamizh, Hema, Kumaran, and Revathi go to Darjeeling without telling Tamizh's father Vijayraghavan and Aravind. Feeling guilty, Tamizh decides he will tell them both the truth once he goes back to Chennai. However, Aravind has followed the group, says he never wants to see Tamizh again for betraying him, and storms off. Later, when Hema and Tamizh are discussing their future, Tamizh learns that Hema does not envision his parents living with them in their marital home. This infuriates Tamizh, and they both fight, eventually leading to their breakup.

They both move on with their own lives. Tamizh starts work as a junior officer at his father's income tax office, and Hema marries Aravind. Later, Tamizh's family arranges his marriage with Yamuna. They gradually fall in love with each other and eventually forget Hema. One day, Vijayraghavan returns home tense and shouts at his wife. The next morning, when Yamuna opens the bathroom door, it is found that Vijayraghavan had hung himself. Everybody accuses him of stealing an important tax file from his office. Tamizh is also suspended without pay, and the Government Quarters Chief evicts him because of his bad reputation. At the same time, Yamuna informs her family that she might be pregnant. Tamizh, his mother, and Yamuna are asked to evict; they stay at Yamuna's parents' house but leave because her parents mistreat Tamizh. They stay at a hut temporarily as Tamizh works at the roadside biriyani shop. Overwhelmed by the sudden turn of events, Tamizh cries out to Yamuna as he struggles to live, but she comforts and supports him throughout.

In the present, Tamizh tries to gather information about his father. A close friend of Vijayraghavan sees Tamizh and says Vijayraghavan once mentioned a bag of money. Tamizh goes to see his boss Prakash Kumar, who tells him that he gave Vijayraghavan 50 million rupees to protect him from an impending raid, but Vijayraghavan forgot what he did with the money. Prakash thinks he stole it, so he took the tax file and demanded Vijayraghavan return the money to get the file back. Tamizh remembers Vijayraghavan once arguing with Aravind, so he goes to see him about the money. Aravind denies knowing about it. Later, Hema confronts Aravind, who admits he took the money for his business and was going to return it once he was settled, but Vijayraghavan killed himself before that. Hema meets Yamuna in the temple and tells her the truth behind the money. Tamizh searches Aravind's house and learns that Aravind planned to use the money for a construction investment. Kumaran tricks the builder into revealing details of the deal closure and convinces the dealer to change the meeting from 7:00 to 9:00. Aravind shows up at 7:00 and encounters Tamizh there. After a brief altercation, Tamizh takes the money with him, but it amounts to just 10 million.

That night, thieves try to steal the money, but Tamizh wards them off. The next day, Tamizh is tipped off that an income tax raid will be conducted at his house. Tamizh has Kumaran protect the money, but Aravind intercepts Kumaran and takes it back. Tamizh tracks down one of Aravind's associates, who has 40 of the 50 million rupees. Tamizh beats him up and takes the money back. Aravind realizes this and tries to protect the rest, eventually losing his mind in the process. Tamizh visits Aravind and reminds him of how happy they were before money was involved. Aravind realises his mistake and gives the money back to Tamizh, asking for his forgiveness. Tamizh goes to Prakash with the money and asks for the tax file back, but Prakash reveals he sold it for 500 million rupees and that Tamizh should take 50 million to forget the issue. Tamizh does not want it and tells Prakash to accept his mistake and cancel his suspension.

The same night, Tamizh takes Yamuna to the hospital because she is having labor pains. En route, Prakash's goons try to kill Tamizh, but he successfully fights back. He later calls Prakash and tells him to turn on the news, where his assistant is revealing Prakash's corrupt activities. Tamizh then tells him that he had given his assistant the 50 million rupees to confess. Prakash is arrested, and Yamuna gives birth to a boy. The film ends with a happy Tamizh leaving for work.

== Cast ==
- Dhanush as Thamizh Vijayraghavan
- Samantha Ruth Prabhu as Yamuna
- Amy Jackson as Hema D'Souza (voiceover by Andrea Jeremiah)
- K. S. Ravikumar as Vijayraghavan
- Radhika Sarathkumar as Thamizh's mother
- Adith Arun as Aravind
- Sathish as Kumaran
- Jayaprakash as Prakash Kumar
- M. S. Bhaskar as Prakash's assistant
- Seetha as Aravind's mother
- Shan as Varun
- Uday Mahesh as Jen Builders agent
- Poorthi Pravin as Revathi
- R. Velraj as Ramalingam (cameo appearance)

== Production ==
In October 2014, R. Velraj, who directed Dhanush in the successful Velaiilla Pattadhari (2014), said he planned to reunite with the actor and was already writing a script. That December, Dhanush confirmed the project had entered development, and announced that Amy Jackson would appear in the film. Later the same month, Samantha Ruth Prabhu joined the cast. K. S. Ravikumar plays Dhanush's father. Dhanush recalled that since Ravikumar was already a successful director, "He understood every aspect the way the director had visualised it. He went in for as many takes as were needed".

The film began production in March 2015, and remained untitled until October 2015. Despite not being a sequel to Velaiilla Pattadhari, it was referred to by the media as VIP 2, and the team ended up using that as a working title before officially settling on Thanga Magan, previously the title of a 1983 film. The film was originally titled Tamizh Magan until executives insisted on Thanga Magan.

Jackson finished work in the film in June 2015, after filming sequences alongside the other two lead actors. ln July 2015, a fight scene and montage shots were shot without Velraj, who had to prioritise his work as cinematographer for Paayum Puli. Velraj consequently denied reports that he had a fallout with the rest of the team. Filming wrapped by October.

== Soundtrack ==
The soundtrack was composed by Anirudh Ravichander, and lyrics were written by poetu Dhanush. The audio was released on 26 November 2015 digitally, and the audio launch was held a day later.

Track listing
No.	Title	Singer(s)	Length
1.	"Oh Oh"	Dhanush, Nikhita Gandhi	4:36
2.	"Enna Solla"	Shweta Mohan	3:36
3.	"Tak Bak"	Anirudh Ravichander	2:34
4.	"Jodi Nilave"	Dhanush, Shweta Mohan	2:58
Total length:			13:44

== Release ==
Thanga Magan's Tamil Nadu theatrical rights were sold to Sri Green Productions. The film was released on 18 December 2015.

=== Critical reception ===
DNA India rated the film 3 stars and wrote, "Watch the movie for the fine performances by the lead actors." Sify wrote, "Director Velraj delivers a clean film with textured characters and poignant moments." Malini Mannath of The New Indian Express wrote, "An average entertainer, Thangamagan doesn’t quite strike the right chord, as the plot gets lost." The Times of India gave 2.5/5 stars, praising the principal cast's performances but criticized the second half and characterization. Sudhir Srinivasan of The Hindu wrote, "Thangamagan doesn’t just want to target the youth, like VIP did. It wants to appeal to the family audiences too. So, it doesn’t want to be any of those films, and yet, in a way, it is a disappointing mixture of all of them." S Saraswathi of Rediff.com gave 2.5/5 stars and wrote, "The director has loaded the first half with plenty of comedy, romance and sentiments, but seems to have run out of ideas in the second with the film ending on a tame note."

=== Accolades ===
Award	Category	Nominee(s)	Result	Ref.
63rd Filmfare Awards South	Best Female Playback Singer – Tamil	Shweta Mohan (for "Enna Solla")	Won	
63rd Filmfare Awards South	Best Supporting Actress – Tamil	Radhika Sarathkumar	Won	
63rd Filmfare Awards South	Best Male Playback Singer – Tamil	Dhanush (for "Oh Oh")	Nominated	
63rd Filmfare Awards South	Best Supporting Actor – Tamil	K. S. Ravikumar	Nominated	
