= Pa. Pandi =

- Theatrical release poster
- Directed by: Dhanush
- Written by: Dhanush
- Produced by: Dhanush
- Starring: Rajkiran; Revathi; Prasanna; Dhanush; Madonna Sebastian
- Cinematography: Velraj
- Edited by: Prasanna GK
- Music by: Sean Roldan
- Production company: Wunderbar Films
- Distributed by: K Productions
- Release date: 14 April 2017
- Running time: 125 minutes
- Country: India
- Language: Tamil

Pa. Pandi (also known as Power Paandi) is a 2017 Indian Tamil-language comedy drama film written, directed and produced by Dhanush, in his directorial debut. It stars Rajkiran in the titular role, alongside Revathi, Prasanna, Chaya Singh, while Dhanush, Madonna Sebastian, Gautham Vasudev Menon and Dhivyadharshini made cameo appearances. It follows a retired stuntman who travels to Hyderabad to seek out freedom, and also to reunite with his old village lover.

The film was officially announced in September 2016 under the title Power Paandi. Principal photography commenced the same month in Chennai, which was followed by another schedules held at Hyderabad and Madurai, and wrapped by February 2017. That April, the title was shortened to Pa Paandi because of the makers seeking entertainment tax exemption. The music was composed by Sean Roldan, cinematography was handled by R. Velraj and editing by Prasanna GK.

Pa Paandi was released on 14 April 2017, coinciding with the Tamil New Year's Day. It received positive reviews from critics and became a commercial success. The film was remade in Kannada as Ambi Ning Vayassaytho (2018).

== Plot ==
Power Pandi, a former stuntman in Tamil cinema, is now leading a retired life with his son Raghavan and family. Pandi is very close to his grandchildren Dhruv and Shaksha. He can not sit idle at home and gets involved in other issues outside his house, which brings trouble to Raghavan. He also tries to keep him occupied by going for some part-time jobs like a gym instructor, sidekick, and even returning to being a cinema stuntman, but nothing fulfils him. This brings friction between Pandi and Raghavan.

Pandi, seeking his freedom, goes out of his house with his old Royal Enfield Bullet and old-age savings. On his way, he sees a bunch of old people riding their bikes like him, and narrates his first love experience with them. He shares about how he, at his young age, met Poonthendral for the first time, how they fell in love, and how they were separated. He tells them that he is on a journey to find Poonthendral again. An old man in that group helps Pandi locate Poonthendral. Pandi messages Poonthendral, who has now settled in Hyderabad, as he was in her place and was eager to meet her again.

Finally, Poonthendral agrees to meet him in a restaurant, and both of them meet, remembering all the by-gone days. They post their meetups on social media and express happiness for each other's lives. Pandi proposes to Poonthendral that they live the rest of their lives together. Poonthendral, who was initially reluctant at his decision, later convinces herself about his companionship and asks him to come to her house the next day for lunch and to meet her family (her daughter and granddaughter).

Back in Chennai, Raghavan realises his mistake and starts searching for his father everywhere. Dhruv locates Pandi using social media and finally comes to Poonthendral's house in Hyderabad to take Pandi back with them. When Pandi comes to Poonthendral's house for lunch, he gets reunited with Raghavan's family. Poonthendral and Pandi realise that their lives have to go this way and decide to be in touch with each other for the rest of their lives. With many emotional bursts, Pandi leaves Poonthendral's house with Raghavan, waving his hands in the air without seeing her, to which she responds.

== Cast ==
- Rajkiran as Pandian Pazhanisami (Power Pandi)
  - Dhanush as younger Pandi
- Revathi as Poonthendral
  - Madonna Sebastian as younger Poonthendral
- Prasanna as Raghavan "Rambo"
- Master Raghavan as Dhruv
- Baby Chaavi Sharma as Shaksha
- Chaya Singh as Premalatha
- Vidyullekha Raman as Poongodi
- Bhawana Aneja as Power Pandi's wife
- Aadukalam Naren as Chandrasekhar, Poonthendral's father
- Meena Vemuri as Mrs. Chandrasekhar, Poonthendral's mother
- Bharathi Kannan as Poongodi's father
- Dheena as Mani, Pandi's friend
- Sendrayan as Drug Seller
- Rinson Simon as Varun
- Supergood Subramani as a police officer
- Robo Shankar as hero in Gautham's film
- Dhivyadharshini as Poonthendral's daughter
- Stunt Silva as Bullet Raja
- Baba Bhaskar as a villager
- Balaji Mohan as Raghavan, Pandi's neighbour
- Velraj as Police Inspector
- Som Shekar as Letter Boy in song "Vaanam"
- Gautham Vasudev Menon as Director Gautham (Guest appearance)

== Production ==
On 7 September 2016, Dhanush announced his directorial debut titled Power Paandi, with a first look poster being released to the media, and also producing the film under his production house, Wunderbar Films. The film has Rajkiran playing the title role as "Power Paandi" and Prasanna playing a prominent role, as Rajkiran's son, while Sean Roldan, Velraj and Prasanna G. K. became a part of the film's technical crew as its music composer, cinematographer and editor respectively. The film began production on the day of its public announcement, and wrapped in late February 2017. In April 2017, the title was shortened to Pa. Pandi to seek tax exemption.

== Soundtrack ==
The music and score of the film were composed by Sean Roldan. The song "Venpani Malare" written by Dhanush, features both male and female versions sung by Roldan and Shweta Mohan, and an additional version sung by Dhanush was released later. The track list was released on 25 February 2017, and the audio launch was held on 9 March 2017. An additional version of "Venpani Malare" which was sung by Dhanush was released separately on 6 April 2017.

Siddharth K of Sify rated the album 3 out of 5, with a verdict "Sean Roldan's big ticket to the top league." Surendhar MK of Hindustan Times rated the album 4 out of 5.

Track listing
No.	Title	Lyrics	Singer(s)	Length
1.	"Vaanam" (The Life of Power Paandi)	Selvaraghavan	Ananthu	4:27
2.	"Soorakaathu" (The Mass of Power Paandi)	Dhanush	Dhanush	2:53
3.	"Paarthen" (The Youth of Power Paandi)	Selvaraghavan	Sean Roldan, Shweta Mohan	3:03
4.	"Veesum Kaathodadhaan" (Power Paandi: The Nomad)	Raju Murugan	Sean Roldan, Anthony Daasan	2:58
5.	"Venpani Malare" (The Romance of Power Paandi — Male Version)	Dhanush	Sean Roldan	3:53
6.	"Venpani Malare" (The Romance of Power Paandi — Female Version)	Dhanush	Shweta Mohan	3:53
7.	"Venpani Malare" (Additional Version)	Dhanush	Dhanush	3:53
Total length:				24:01

== Critical reception ==
Pa. Pandi received critical acclaim.

On the review aggregator website Rotten Tomatoes, 100% of 6 critics' reviews are positive, with an average rating of 7.5/10.

Baradwaj Rangan wrote for Film Companion, "Here's why Pa Paandi works. Rajkiran. He exudes such grandfatherly warmth, it's impossible not to care for him. And as the second half unfolds, the story picks up too". M Suganth of The Times of India wrote, "In his directorial debut, Dhanush gives us a heartwarming film that, despite its conventional storytelling, packs in a huge emotional wallop". Sowmya Rajendran wrote for The News Minute, "At times, you do feel certain scenes could have been shot with a little more subtlety, but Pa Paandi has enough going for it to make you ignore these gripes and enjoy this unusual little film". Srivatsan of India Today wrote, "Barring its flaws, Pa Paandi is full of positivity. This better not be Dhanush's best work, as a director".
