= Anegan =

2015 Indian film directed by K. V. Anand

- Theatrical release poster
- Directed by: K. V. Anand
- Written by: K. V. Anand
- Dialogues by: Subha
- Produced by: Kalpathi S Aghoram; Kalpathi S Ganesh; Kalpathi S Suresh
- Starring: Dhanush; Karthik; Amyra Dastur
- Cinematography: Om Prakash
- Edited by: Anthony
- Music by: Harris Jayaraj
- Production company: AGS Entertainment
- Distributed by: AGS Entertainment; Wunderbar Films; Ayngaran International
- Release date: 13 February 2015
- Running time: 157 minutes
- Country: India
- Language: Tamil

Anegan (transl. Myriad; lit. 'Man with several shadows') is a 2015 Indian Tamil-language romantic action thriller film co-written and directed by K. V. Anand and produced by AGS Entertainment. The film stars Dhanush and Amyra Dastur (in her Tamil debut), while Karthik, Ashish Vidyarthi, Aishwarya Devan, Mukesh Tiwari and Jagan appear in supporting roles. Set in four different time periods, the film is based on the theme of reincarnation, which revolves around Ashwin (Dhanush) and Madhu (Dastur) who were lovers in their past lives, have been brought together in the present.

The film was announced in May 2013. Principal photography started that September, and took place in Vietnam, Cambodia, Malaysia and Burma, and some parts of India including Pondicherry, and was completed in September 2014. The film features music composed by Harris Jayaraj, with cinematography handled by Om Prakash and editing done by Anthony. It was released on 13 February 2015.

== Plot ==
In 1960s, Murugappa alias Munaruna is a Tamil worker in Burma. Munaruna's friend Saamuda falls in love with Mallika, but Mallika loves Munaruna. Munaruna saves Samudra, the daughter of a Burmese army general, from a Ferris wheel accident and they fall in love. After learning about this, Mallika is devastated and marries Saamuda. The Burmese general disapproves of the union between Munaruna and Samudra, and revokes the privileges that the Tamil immigrants had until then. Violence breaks out and the Tamil nationals flee Burma. Munaruna and Samudra join the refugees on a ship with Saamuda and Mallika. Samudra's father arrives looking for her, where Mallika spitefully reveals about their hideout. As Samudra and Munaruna try to escape by diving into the ocean, Munaruna is shot and killed. Samudra handcuffs herself to Munaruna and drowns with him after promising to be together forever.

In present-day India, Samudra, who is now known as Madhu, tells her psychiatrist Dr. Radhika that she has already met Saamuda and Mallika as Jagan and Meera, who are fellow programmers in the game development company where she works. Radhika dismisses this as work stress and gives medicines to Madhu. Madhu meets Ashwin, a new employee in her company, and seeing his resemblance to Munaruna, flirts with him. Their boss Kiran knows to extract work from employees with ease. Meera hallucinates about ghosts trying to assault her, where she jumps from the office window and dies. Madhu is disturbed and attends her therapy sessions with Radhika when she remembers her first birth where she was a princess named Shenbagavalli and was in love with a king named Ilamaran, who also resembles Ashwin. The two are killed by a traitorous officer in Ilamaran's army.

Madhu and Ashwin meet with a car accident, where Madhu is admitted to a hospital. Madhu dreams about overhearing Inspector Gopinath's conversation about a couple named Kaali and Kalyani, when she intervenes and says that she knows their whereabouts. Once awake, Madhu recites the dream to the policemen in the hospital and they are confused. Gopinath, who is the present police commissioner, visits her and Madhu realises that he looks like the same police officer from her dream in the hospital. Gopinath tells that the Kaali-Kalyani story was a missing person case that happened 25 years ago. Madhu claims that Kaali and Kalyani were killed and buried and takes Gopinath and Ashwin to a place where they dig up and find skeletons identified as remains of Kaali and Kalyani. Gopinath finds a ring engraved with the letter R on one of the skeletons. Ashwin is confused as to what R may mean.

Kiran hears about her hallucinations and rushes to the clinic. Madhu hallucinates about her third birth, where she is Kalyani, a Brahmin girl who falls in love with a goon called Kaali. Kalyani tells Kaali to confess his crimes and serve out his time in prison in return for her hand in marriage. Kalyani's father Murthy is displeased and forcefully arranges her marriage with Ravi while Kaali is in prison. Kaali escapes from prison and meets Kalyani and they plan to elope, but Ravi finds out and offers to help them. However, Ravi takes them to a secluded spot, where he murders the couple out of jealousy and buries them. The finger with the ring belongs to Ravi and it was amputated by Kaali during the fight. Ravi unknowingly buries it along with Kaali's and Kalyani's corpses.

Back to the present, Madhu learns the truth of Kaali and Kalyani's death from Murthy. Suddenly, a twist occurs where it shows that Ravi is Kiran. Kiran kidnaps Madhu and kills Murthy. Ashwin finds video games with plots resembling the stories of Madhu's previous births and Meera's hallucination before her death. Ashwin saves Radhika from Kiran's goons who tried to kill her. Radhika reveals that Kiran has been giving illegal drugs to his employees to boost their creativity to profit with intense and uniquely themed games. As a side effect of the drug, the employees hallucinate, leading to Madhu's memories of her "past lives" and the recalling of the story of Kalyani as her own. Along with Radhika, Ashwin goes to Gopinath's office to reveal about Kiran's illegal activities. But on the way Kiran's men attacks them again and it results in Radhika's death.

Ashwin reaches Kiran's lair to save Madhu. A fight ensues, where Ashwin manages to confront and defeat Kiran and his men. Kiran is killed when a knife Ashwin threw into a tree falls onto his chest. Gopinath covers up the death as a suicide with Ashwin's help, stating that Kiran killed himself for fear of dealing with the repercussions of his illegal activities. Ashwin and Madhu marry and honeymoon in Burma. As they playfully argue over whether Madhu's dreams had all been hallucinations or partly true, Ashwin and Madhu pass by a log with a heart and the names of Munaruna and Samudra carved into it.

== Cast ==
- Dhanush in four roles as:
  - Ashwin, a young man who works at Kiran's company in the system admin department and falls in love with Madhu
  - Kaaliswaran (Kaali), A painter in Madras 1987 who falls in love with Kalyani
  - Murugappa (Munaruna), A construction worker in Burma in 1962 and Samudra's lover
  - Ilamaran, King Ilamaran in ancient Tamil Nadu (portrait in 'Roja Kadale' song only)
- Karthik as Ravikiran (Kiran), MD of a Gaming Company, the main antagonist
- Amyra Dastur (all roles dubbed by Raveena Ravi) in four roles as:
  - Madhumitha, a game designer at Kiran's company who falls in love with Ashwin
  - Kalyani, a social activist in Madras 1987 who falls in love with Kaali
  - Samudra, a school student in Burma in 1962 who falls in love with Munaruna
  - Shenbagavalli, Princess in ancient Tamil Nadu (portrait in 'Roja Kadale' song only)
- Aishwarya Devan in a dual role as:
  - Meera, a co-worker with Ashwin and Madhu
  - Mallika, Munaruna's one-side lover, and Saamuda's wife
- Ashish Vidyarthi in a dual role as:
  - Gopinath, Inspector of Police in Madras 1987 and later promoted as Commissioner in Chennai city
  - Rana, head soldier of King Ilamaran in ancient Tamil Nadu (portrait in 'Roja Kadale' song only)
- Jagan in dual roles as:
  - Jagan, co-worker with Ashwin and Madhu
  - Saamuda, Munaruna's friend in Burma in 1962
- Mukesh Tiwari in a dual role as:
  - Radhakrishnan, Madhu's uncle in present
  - Army general of Burma in 1962 and Samudra's father
- Thalaivasal Vijay as Moorthy, Kalyani's father
- Vinaya Prasad as Madhumitha's mother
- Lena as Dr. Radhika and a woman in Burma who was fighting with an officer
- Shankar Krishnamurthy as Ashwin's father
- D. R. K. Kiran as Ranjith, Kiran's goon
- Revathi Sankar as Ravikiran's mother
- Veera Santhanam as Guruji
- K.R.G Sharad as Genie
- Bhawana Aneja as Samudra's mother (of Tamil descent) in Burma 1962
- Baby Vedhika
- Rajesh Milton
- Pankaj Rajan
- Baba Bhaskar (special appearance in the song "Danga Maari Oodhari")

== Production ==
=== Development ===
In May 2013, director K. V. Anand was announced to be collaborating with actor Dhanush for his next film. AGS Entertainment, which produced Anand's previous directorial Maattrraan (2012) was confirmed to be producing this too. Though it was rumoured to be titled as Thaara Thappatta Ready, based on words that Anand used on social media, Anand clarified that he meant a song from that film and the film was yet to be titled. The title was eventually announced as Anegan, derived from a word appearing in Thiruvasagam by the Tamil poet Manikkavacakar.

It was revealed that the story comprises multiple period set-ups. In an interaction with trade analyst Sreedhar Pillai, Anand described the film as a romantic thriller unlike his previous films which were based on issues such as smuggling or politics. The technical crew consisted of cinematographer Om Prakash, editor Anthony, art director D. R. K. Kiran, action choreographer Kanal Kannan and writer duo Subha. As with most K. V. Anand films, Harris Jayaraj was once again signed to compose the music. Though a cinematographer himself, Anand chose not to do the same for Anegan, citing the difficulty of simultaneously doing both direction and cinematography.

=== Casting ===
Initially, K. V. Anand, narrated the story to Vijay and Asin but they could not commit the project, due to date issues, and Vijay suggested Dhanush's name. Dhanush would sport four different looks, with one of his hairstyles paying homage to Kamal Haasan's look in Tik Tik Tik (1981).

In August 2013, Amyra Dastur, who made her film debut in Issaq (2013) was announced as the lead actress, making her Tamil debut. Initially, Alia Bhatt was considered for the female lead role but her unavailability due to commitments in Hindi films, led the team to choose Dastur instead. Speaking of Dastur's involvement, Anand needed a young heroine who can play a school girl and a working professional and felt Dastur had fit the bill perfectly. In preparation for her role, she was asked to see Tamil films, and also took Tamil lessons from Dhanush to get her dialogues right. She was further reported to be performing stunts for the film. In an interview with IANS, she said that she would portray three different roles in the film.

For the role of the antagonist, Anand initially thought of Arvind Swamy and R. Madhavan but Swamy was committed to Thani Oruvan (2015) and Madhavan was considered too young. Hence, Anand chose Karthik, whom he had been a longtime fan of, and hoped the film would mark a successful comeback for the actor who had been largely inactive in Tamil films for the past few years. Though mainly known for heroic roles, Karthik agreed, recalling an earlier suggestion by Mani Ratnam to try a negative role. Aishwarya Devan described her role as "the second lead role". Malayalam actress Lenaa was also selected to play a supporting role, making her Tamil debut.

=== Filming ===
Principal photography began on 2 September 2013. It was reported that the film would be shot across locations such as Vietnam, Cambodia, Malaysia, and Burma among many other countries. As of early November, Dhanush was simultaneously working on Velaiilla Pattadhari (2014). Later that month, filming moved to Arakkonam. While shooting at the Arakkonam Junction railway station, more than 2000 people gathered at the location to witness the shooting. Anand stated that they cooperated with the crew members patiently and filming went ahead without any disruption.

As of mid-January 2014, filming was taking place in Hyderabad, including a scene set in a marketplace with 200 extras. The team then moved to Malaysia in late March 2014. There, the film was shot at locations including the Penang Free School, Stewart Lane, York Road and Chew Jetty. Initially, Om Prakash was hired as one of three cinematographers to film separate sequences, but after being impressed by his filmography, Anand had signed him as the main cinematographer.

By 29 May 2014, 90% of the film was shot, including three song sequences. Another song sequence and part of the climax were shot on a farmland, spread over 100 acres, near Pondicherry. During the process of shooting the climax, which was reported to be a stunt sequence, Dhanush injured his leg severely. Filming was halted for three weeks, after which Dhanush recovered and shooting proceeded as scheduled. According to unit members, Dastur stunned the unit with her perfect lip sync for Tamil dialogues and that she overshadowed Dhanush in some places as well. On 26 August 2014, Dhanush stated that he had started dubbing for the film. Filming wrapped in mid-September. The film was mixed at A. R. Rahman's AM Studios with the conversion of 5.1 surround sound to Auro 11.1 layout.

== Themes and influences ==
M. Suganth of The Times of India in his review stated that the film had "traces" of the Telugu film Magadheera (2009), the Tamil film Enakkul Oruvan (1984), and the American films Cloud Atlas (2012) and The Fountain (2006) but attributed the comparison "mainly due to the reincarnation theme."

== Music ==
The film's soundtrack is scored by K. V. Anand's regular collaborator Harris Jayaraj, which was his first Dhanush-starrer. The soundtrack album features six tracks, written by Vairamuthu, Kabilan Vairamuthu, Rokesh and C. S. Amudhan. The album was released by Sony Music India in November 2014 to positive reviews. The song "Danga Maari Oodhari" became a chartbuster upon release.

== Release ==
=== Theatrical ===
The makers of Anegan initially refused schedule the film's release date due to uncertainty over the release of Lingaa and I. It was later reported that the film would release after Pongal, which fell on 15 January 2015. In December 2014, the film was cleared by the censor board. The film was eventually released on 13 February 2015. It opened in nearly 1000 screens worldwide, making it the biggest release in Dhanush film to that point. The film got exemption from entertainment tax levied by the state government. Ahead of the film's release, S. Mariselvam, the president of the Thirukurippu Thonda Nayanar Maha Sabhai (transl. Association for the Washerman Community), alleged that the Vannar community women were being portrayed in poor light, based on what he saw in the trailer, and filed a petition seeking to stop the film's release unless the objected scenes were deleted. However, the petition was dismissed. The film was dubbed in Telugu as Anekudu, and released on 5 March 2015. The Kerala distribution rights were bought by E4 Entertainment.

=== Television broadcast ===
The television premiere of Anegan was announced to take place via Sun TV on 14 April 2015, coinciding with Puthandu. This announcement drew backlash from Dhanush's fans who felt it was too early for the film to have its television premiere, and they called for its postponement. Despite that, Sun TV went ahead with the premiere.

== Reception ==
=== Critical response ===
M. Suganth of The Times of India rated the film 4 stars out of 5 and stated, "Anegan is pure camp but also a hugely entertaining one". Udhav Naig of The Hindu wrote, "With most commercial films recycling the usual plot and its many tropes, full credit to K.V. Anand for striving to narrate a banal plot – full of déjà vu and clichés – in an enterprising manner." Another Hindu reviewer Sudhir Srinivasan wrote "Anegan...is a complex story told simplistically. Had the complexity been retained, and had the masala spoon been of lesser size, it would have made for a great film. For now, though, it will have to satisfy itself with being a hit film." S Saraswathi of Rediff.com stated, "The narrative technique and interesting screenplay keep things moving at a brisk pace. But on the downside, there are far too many songs and several unanswered questions".

Sify wrote, "Gorgeously shot, crisply edited, and handsomely mounted, KV Anand's Anegan is a fast-paced rollicking adventure ride that is gripping till the very end". Anupama Subramanian of Deccan Chronicle wrote "Anegan is a decent flick, but a few shortcomings hold it back and the film can be enjoyed only in parts." Arathi Kannan of Onmanorama wrote "Anegan's sure bet is Dhanush and his many characters. And it seems like he's poised to score on the favourable pitch, even if they are textbook shots." Gautaman Bhaskaran of Hindustan Times rated it 2 stars out of 5 and stated "If Anegan is a mishmash of many films that one has seen over the years, the performances are passé. Yes, a new look Karthik may be a novelty, but Dhanush appears to be disinterested in changing his style or his roles."

=== Accolades ===
Awards	Date of ceremony (Note: Date is linked to the article about the awards held that year, wherever possible.)	Category	Recipient(s) and nominee(s)	Result	Ref.
Edison Awards	14 February 2016	Favourite Song	"Danga Maari Oodhari"	Won	
Filmfare Awards South	18 June 2016	Best Actor – Tamil	Dhanush	Nominated	
IIFA Utsavam	24–25 January 2016	Best Lyricist – Tamil	Rokesh – ("Danga Maari Oodhari")	Nominated	
IIFA Utsavam	24–25 January 2016	Best Lyricist – Tamil	Vairamuthu – ("Roja Kadale")	Nominated	
IIFA Utsavam	24–25 January 2016	Best Male Playback Singer – Tamil	Dhanush, Marana Gana Viji and Naveen Madhav – ("Danga Maari Oodhari")	Nominated	
IIFA Utsavam	24–25 January 2016	Best Female Playback Singer – Tamil	Bhavatharini – ("Aathadi Aathadi")	Nominated	
Mirchi Music Awards South	27 July 2016	Lyricist of the Year – Tamil	Vairamuthu – ("Aathadi Aathadi")	Nominated	
Mirchi Music Awards South	27 July 2016	Female Vocalist of the Year – Tamil	Bhavatharini – ("Aathadi Aathadi")	Nominated	
Mirchi Music Awards South	27 July 2016	Mannin Kural – Male	Marana Gana Viji – ("Danga Maari Oodhari")	Won	
Mirchi Music Awards South	27 July 2016	Upcoming Male Vocalist of the Year – Tamil	Marana Gana Viji – ("Danga Maari Oodhari")	Nominated	
Mirchi Music Awards South	27 July 2016	Upcoming Female Vocalist of the Year – Tamil	Rokesh – ("Danga Maari Oodhari")	Nominated	
South Indian International Movie Awards	30 June–1 July 2016	Best Director – Tamil	K. V. Anand	Nominated	
South Indian International Movie Awards	30 June–1 July 2016	Best Actor – Tamil	Dhanush	Nominated	
South Indian International Movie Awards	30 June–1 July 2016	Best Actor in a Negative Role – Tamil	Karthik	Nominated	
South Indian International Movie Awards	30 June–1 July 2016	Best Debut Actress – Tamil	Amyra Dastur	Nominated	
