= Wunderbar Films =

Film Production Company

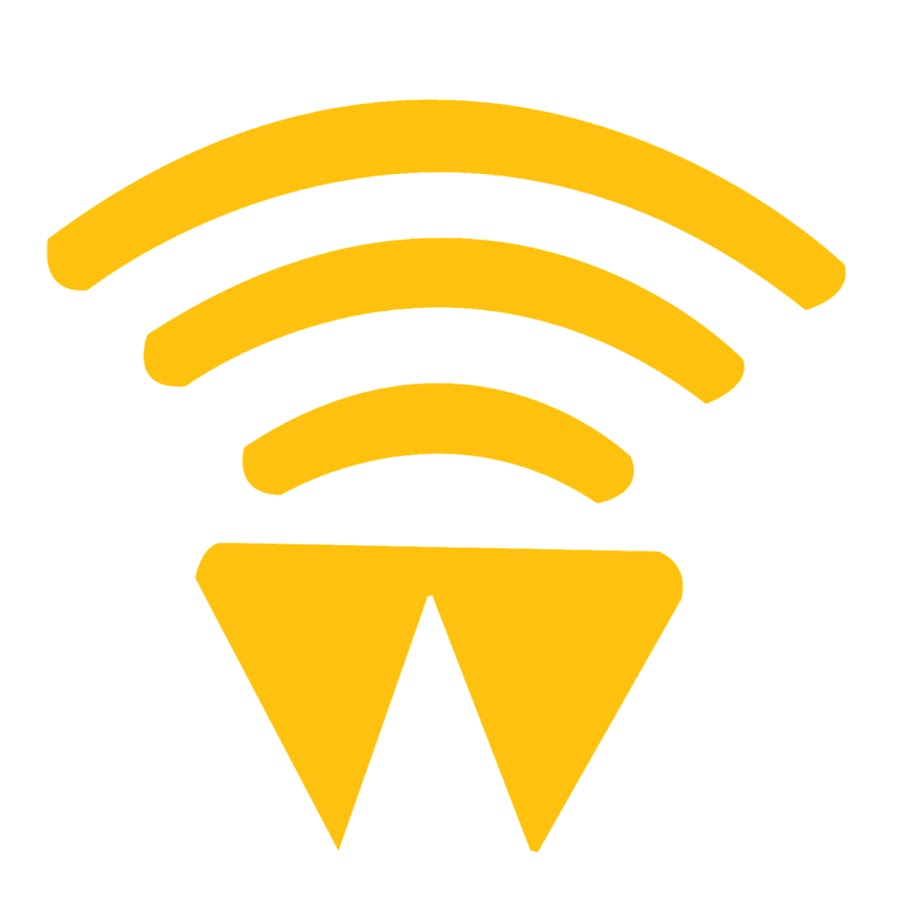
- Trade name: Wunderbar Films Pvt. Ltd.
- Type: Privately held company
- Industry: Motion picture
- Founded: 20 May 2010; 16 years ago
- Founders: Dhanush; Aishwarya Rajinikanth
- Headquarters: Chennai, Tamil Nadu, India
- Products: Film production; Record producer
- Operating income: ▲₹507.4 million (2015) ▼₹46.7 million (2016)
- Owner: Dhanush

Wunderbar Films is an Indian film production and distribution company established by actor Dhanush and his ex-wife Aishwarya, on 20 May 2010. Based in Chennai, Tamil Nadu, it mainly produces and distributes Tamil films, and occasionally Malayalam and Hindi films. The headquarters of the company is in Nungambakkam, Chennai.

== History ==
Wunderbar Films was established by actor Dhanush and his wife Aishwarya on 20 May 2010. The studio was named "Wunderbar", meaning "wonderful" in German, which Dhanush picked up from the 2009 American film, Inglourious Basterds. Earlier short films produced by Dhanush, although not released to the public, had the banner "Wunderbar".

== Filmography ==
Year	Title	Language	Director	Cast	Ref.
2012	3	Tamil	Aishwarya Rajnikanth	Dhanush, Shruti Haasan	
2013	Ethir Neechal	Tamil	R. S. Durai Senthilkumar	Sivakarthikeyan, Priya Anand, Nandita Swetha	
2014	Velaiilla Pattadhari	Tamil	R. Velraj	Dhanush, Amala Paul, Surabhi	
2015	Shamitabh	Tamil	R. Balki	Dhanush, Amitabh Bachchan, Akshara Haasan	
2015	Kaaki Sattai	Tamil	R. S. Durai Senthilkumar	Sivakarthikeyan, Sri Divya	
2015	Kaaka Muttai	Tamil	M. Manikandan	Vignesh, Ramesh, Aishwarya Rajesh	
2015	Maari	Tamil	Balaji Mohan	Dhanush, Kajal Aggarwal, Vijay Yesudas	
2015	Naanum Rowdydhaan	Tamil	Vignesh Shivan	Vijay Sethupathi, Nayantara, Parthiban	
2015	Thanga Magan	Tamil	R. Velraj	Dhanush, Samantha, Amy Jackson	
2016	Visaranai	Tamil	Vetrimaaran	Dinesh, Anandhi	
2016	Amma Kanakku	Tamil	Ashwiny Iyer Tiwari	Amala Paul, Revathi, P. Samuthirakani	
2017	Cinema Veeran	Tamil	Aishwarya Rajnikanth	Rajinikanth	
2017	Pa. Pandi	Tamil	Dhanush	Rajkiran, Prasanna, Chaya Singh	
2017	Velaiilla Pattadhari 2	Tamil	Soundarya Rajinikanth	Dhanush, Kajol, Amala Paul	
2017	Tharangam	Malayalam	Dominic Arun	Tovino Thomas, Balu Varghese	
2018	Kaala	Tamil	Pa. Ranjith	Rajinikanth, Nana Patekar, Easwari Rao, Huma Qureshi	
2018	Vada Chennai	Tamil	Vetrimaaran	Dhanush, Ameer Sultan, Samuthirakani, Aishwarya Rajesh, Andrea Jeremiah	
2018	Maari 2	Tamil	Balaji Mohan	Dhanush, Tovino Thomas, Krishna, Sai Pallavi, Varalaxmi Sarathkumar	
2025	Nilavuku En Mel Ennadi Kobam	Tamil	Dhanush	Pavish Narayan, Mathew Thomas, Anikha Surendran, Priya Prakash Varrier, Venkatesh Menon, Rabiya Khatoon, Ramya Ranganathan	
2025	Idli Kadai	Tamil	Dhanush	Dhanush, Nithya Menen, Arun Vijay, Rajkiran, Sathyaraj, R. Parthiban, Shalini Pandey, P. Samuthirakani	
2026	O.M: Operation Mole	Tamil	Rajkumar Periasamy	Dhanush, Mammootty, Sreeleela, Sai Pallavi	
TBA	Tamizh Murugan †	Tamil	Vetrimaaran	Dhanush	

== Film soundtracks released ==
Year	Film	Notes
2014	Velaiilla Pattadhari	Also producer
2015	Kaaki Sattai	Also producer
2015	Naanum Rowdydhaan	Also producer
2016	Amma Kanakku	Also producer
2017	Yathumagi Nindrai	
2017	Pa. Pandi	Also producer
2017	Velaiilla Pattadhari 2	Also producer
2018	Kaala: Karikaalan	Also producer
2018	Vada Chennai	Also producer
2018	Maari 2	Also producer
2025	Nilavuku En Mel Ennadi Kobam	Also producer
