= Mayakkam Enna =

2011 film directed by Selvaraghavan

- Theatrical release poster
- Directed by: Selvaraghavan
- Written by: Selvaraghavan
- Produced by: Dineshkumar; Easwaramoorthy; Manohar Prasad; Ravi Shankar Prasad; Selvaraghavan
- Starring: Dhanush; Richa Gangopadhyay
- Cinematography: Ramji
- Edited by: Kola Bhaskar
- Music by: G. V. Prakash Kumar
- Production company: Aum Productions
- Distributed by: Gemini Film Circuit
- Release date: 25 November 2011
- Running time: 151 minutes
- Country: India
- Language: Tamil

Mayakkam Enna (transl. What is this unconsciousness?) is a 2011 Indian Tamil-language psychological drama film written and directed by Selvaraghavan and produced by Gemini Film Circuit in association with Aum Productions, its own banner. It stars his brother Dhanush, along with Richa Gangopadhyay (in her Tamil film debut), and features music scored by G. V. Prakash Kumar while the cinematography was handled by Ramji. The film revolves around an aspiring photographer and the problems he faces, causing him to fall into distress. How he manages to achieve his goals from thereafter forms the rest of the story.

The film was distributed by Gemini Film Circuit, and it was released on 25 November 2011.

== Plot ==
Karthik Swaminathan, an introvert, referred to as 'Genius' by his friends, is a freelance photographer who aspires to become a wildlife photographer like Madhesh Krishnasamy. His friends Sunder Ramesh, Shankar, Padmini, and Vindhya support him and his sister after the death of their parents.

One day, Sunder introduces Yamini as his girlfriend to Karthik and his friends. On their first meeting, Karthik and Yamini have a bitter experience but slowly develop a special bond. Karthik tries to stay away from Yamini since he does not want to break his friend's heart, but a sequence of events brings them closer. Eventually, Sunder's father arranges for Karthik and Yamini to be married.

After their wedding, Karthik learns that Madhesh had used a photograph that the former had taken to win a national award. After this incident, he turns into a physically abusive alcoholic, people start doubting his sanity, and his mental health is affected. Yamini supports Karthik, hoping that he will succeed one day. Days later, when the residents of Karthik's neighbourhood berate Karthik behind his back in front of Yamini, she gets angry and defensive and supports her husband. After watching TV, where Karthik sees Madhesh win an award for the photo, he starts breaking the TV and accidentally pushes Yamini in a fit of rage. This leads to Yamini's miscarriage.

Yamini returns a few days later from the hospital and stops talking to Karthik entirely. This makes Karthik come to terms with reality, and he mends his ways. He finally gets a break and becomes a professional wildlife photographer, and one of his photographs gets nominated for an International Photography Award, which he wins. On this occasion, Karthik thanks everyone for their support and Yamini for her faith in him and declares his love for her. Yamini finally relents and talks to Karthik. Karthik also thanks Madhesh where the film ends.

== Cast ==
- Dhanush as Karthik Swaminathan
- Richa Gangopadhyay as Yamini Karthik (voiceover by Deepa Venkat)
- Sundar Ramu as Sundar Ramesh
- Mathivanan Rajendran as Shankar
- Pooja Devariya as Padmini
- Zara Barring as Ramya
- Shilpi Kiran as Vindhya
- Raviprakash as Madhesh Krishnasamy
- J. Rajiv Choudhry as Ramesh

== Production ==
=== Development ===
In late 2008, it was reported that director Selvaraghavan and his brother, actor Dhanush planned to begin a film titled Idhu Maalai Nerathu Mayakkam, under their sister Vimalageetha's production banner RK Productions; the film was supposed to be made on a shoestring budget within three months, and Andrea Jeremiah was cast as the female lead, who previously collaborated with Selvaraghavan in Aayirathil Oruvan (2010). Despite filming being reportedly completed, it was shelved during the post-production phase.

After completing work on Aayirathil Oruvan, Selvaraghavan decided to collaborate with Dhanush on a project titled Mayakkam Enna, which was meant to be a "breather" owing to the long production period spent on Aayirathil Oruvan. Closer to the release, it was reported that the film was a revival of Idhu Maalai Nerathu Mayakkam, but Selvaraghavan clarified that the films were unrelated.

Selvaraghavan retained most of the crew members from his previous film, including cinematographer Ramji, musician G. V. Prakash Kumar and editor Kola Bhaskar. Prakash left the project due to "money and time issues" and was replaced by Selvaraghavan's regular collaborator Yuvan Shankar Raja. However, he was later replaced by Prakash by early 2011.

=== Casting ===
Dhanush was cast in the lead role as Karthik Swaminathan, a wildlife photographer. Selvaraghavan said, "I didn't choose him because he's my brother; but because he is an actor of substance. His growth has been phenomenal. As the character needs an actor like him, I have cast him." Richa Gangopadhyay was cast as the lead actress in her debut in Tamil cinema, after Selvaraghavan watched her performance in the Telugu film Leader (2010).

Photographer and theatre actor Sunder Ramu was cast in the role of Sunder Ramesh, making his feature film debut. He was cast after Selvaraghavan saw him in a short film. The film marked the debut of Pooja Devariya, who plays Yamini's friend Padmini. Raviprakash played the role of Madhesh Krishnaswamy, whom Karthik admires as the role model.

=== Character design ===
In an interaction with Baradwaj Rangan, Selvaraghavan described the character of Karthik Swaminathan as "something closest to him" owing to the personal connection involved while developing the character. His profession in the film, was also developed from Selvaraghavan's interests on being a wildlife photographer. He noted that, "Photography is something that is rarely done in Tamil cinema. The maximum I have heard of is wedding photography. I am fascinated and can identify with wildlife photography." He considered the profession as "close to being yourself, and you can find yourself close to nature". Hence, he wanted to develop the thing that can be closer to his personal life, as the principal character would face struggles and professional setbacks, he wanted the other side to feel blissful, that can give him the strength to tackle the problems. He also wanted the character to be realistic and complicated, than being one-dimensional and wanted to analyse the struggles towards photography and his personal life as well. Gangopadhyay also admitted her character Yamini, being a fierce, strong-witted, and extremely committed to his profession and relationships while also being a charming a fun-filled character.

=== Filming ===
Filming on Mayakkam Enna began during late-2010. However, in the middle of production, Selvaraghavan was also reported to be involved on Kamal Haasan's Vishwaroopam (2013) and began pre-production for the film. By May 2011, he reportedly exited from that project owing to creative differences and continued working on Mayakkam Enna. The whole film was shot within 55 days.

== Music ==
The soundtrack, composed by G. V. Prakash Kumar in his second collaboration with Selvaraghavan (after Aayirathil Oruvan), was released on 23 September 2011 at Radio Mirchi's Chennai station.

== Release ==
Selvaraghavan initially planned Mayakkam Enna to be released on the first week of October 2011 or during the Diwali day (26 October). The latter date was nearly finalised, and the film's trailer was launched at the grand finale of the Super Singer reality competition that aired via Star Vijay on 23 September. However, it was removed from that date due to post-production issues. The film was later scheduled for release on 11 November, then pushed to 18 November and later to 25 November.

Selvaraghavan tweeted that there was consideration over pushing the film's release so that the semester examinations in colleges would be completed, while reports suggested that the film was being postponed to avoid a possible clash with Osthe. However, the producers reiterated the film's release as 25 November. GK Media acquired the film's distribution rights in the United States and Canada, while Gemini Film Circuit would release the film in Tamil Nadu. A preview screening was held for actor Rajinikanth, then Dhanush's father-in-law, on 23 November.

== Reception ==
=== Critical response ===
The film received positive reviews from critics and audience.

IANS wrote that Selvaraghavan had "succeeded in presenting a sensitive and engaging movie". The Times of India gave 3.5 out of 5, citing: "...with Mayakkam Enna he [Dhanush] proves why he is one of the best actors around". Anupama Subramanian of Deccan Chronicle gave 3.5 out of 5 and stated that it had a "fresh appeal and is straight from the heart without any clichéd frills". Malini Mannath of The New Indian Express wrote: "A sensitively crafted screenplay, deft narration, stunning vignettes and montages, and a brilliant performance by the lead pair, makes Mayakkam Enna a fascinating watch". Deccan Herald wrote that it was "entertaining and worth a watch".

NDTV stated it was a film "with soul and worth a watch". In regard to Dhanush's performance, it wrote: "His myriad emotions elevate the movie to a great extent". Malathi Rangarajan of The Hindu, stated: "Selvaraghavan knows where his potential lies and has tapped it suitably." Pavithra Srinivasan of Rediff gave the film 3 out of 5 and wrote: "[It] has a brilliant first half but the film loses the steam in the second half". Sify claimed: "Simplistic story with a hard hitting impact, Mayakkam Enna will stay with you".

=== Accolades ===
Award (Note: Awards, festivals and organisations are in alphabetical order.)	Date of ceremony (Note: Date is linked to the article about the awards held that year, wherever possible.)	Category	Recipient(s) and nominee(s)	Result	Ref.
Ananda Vikatan Cinema Awards	5 January 2012	Best Music Director	G. V. Prakash Kumar (Note: also for Aadukalam (2011))	Won	
Ananda Vikatan Cinema Awards	5 January 2012	Best Playback Singer — Female	Saindhavi — ("Pirai Thedum")	Won	
Edison Awards	11 March 2012	Best Actress	Richa Gangopadhyay	Won	
Edison Awards	11 March 2012	Best Editor	Kola Bhaskar	Won	
Edison Awards	11 March 2012	Best Cinematographer	Ramji	Won	
Filmfare Awards South	7 July 2012	Best Actress — Tamil	Richa Gangopadhyay	Nominated	
Filmfare Awards South	7 July 2012	Best Supporting Actor — Tamil	Sunder Ramu	Nominated	
Mirchi Music Awards South	4 August 2012	Female Vocalist of the Year	Saindhavi — ("Pirai Thedum")	Won	
Norway Tamil Film Festival	26–29 June 2012	Best Actress	Richa Gangopadhyay	Won	
Norway Tamil Film Festival	26–29 June 2012	Best Editor	Kola Bhaskar	Won	
Norway Tamil Film Festival	26–29 June 2012	Best Dubbing Artiste	Deepa Venkat	Won	
South Indian International Movie Awards	21–22 June 2012	Best Film — Tamil	Mayakkam Enna — Aum Productions	Nominated	
South Indian International Movie Awards	21–22 June 2012	Best Actress — Tamil	Richa Gangopadhyay	Nominated	
South Indian International Movie Awards	21–22 June 2012	Best Cinematographer — Tamil	Ramji	Nominated	
South Indian International Movie Awards	21–22 June 2012	Best Lyricist — Tamil	Dhanush — ("Pirai Thedum")	Won	
South Indian International Movie Awards	21–22 June 2012	Best Male Playback Singer — Tamil	Dhanush — ("Voda Voda Voda")	Won	
South Indian International Movie Awards	21–22 June 2012	Best Female Playback Singer — Tamil	Saindhavi — ("Pirai Thedum")	Won	
Vijay Awards	16 June 2012	Best Actress	Richa Gangopadhyay	Nominated	
Vijay Awards	16 June 2012	Best Debut Actress	Richa Gangopadhyay	Won	
Vijay Awards	16 June 2012	Best Female Playback Singer	Saindhavi — ("Pirai Thedum")	Nominated	
Vijay Awards	16 June 2012	Best Lyricist	Dhanush — ("Voda Voda Voda")	Nominated	
Vijay Awards	16 June 2012	Best Choreographer	Baba Bhaskar — ("Kadhal Yen Kadhal")	Nominated	
Vijay Awards	16 June 2012	Favorite Director	Selvaraghavan	Nominated	
Vijay Awards	16 June 2012	Favourite Song	"Kadhal Yen Kadhal"	Nominated	

== Legacy ==
Mayakkam Enna is regarded one of the best films of Selvaraghavan, as well as for Dhanush, owing to the acting and performances. Manoj Kumar R. of The Indian Express noted that "[Selvaraghavan] has poured his heart out imagining the suffering of an artist, who is drowning himself in self-pity and alcohol. The director takes us to pretty dark places as he explores the depths of the hero’s despondency." Gangopadhyay's character Yamini was considered by journalist Sujatha Narayanan as one of the most well-written female characters in Tamil cinema. However, Subha J. Rao of Film Companion was critical of the trials and tribulations her character faces in the film, questioning "how could a fierce, independent girl who chooses her boyfriend's friend over him turn into the under-confident married woman who is a willing doormat? The kind who tolerates every kind of abuse, refuses to walk out, and finally even washes off proof of her aborted foetus from the floor? Yes, Dhanush's Karthik was suffering, but why is the onus on Yamini to make him a human again?" She considered the film to be most disturbing due to this character design.
