= List of accolades received by Aadukalam =

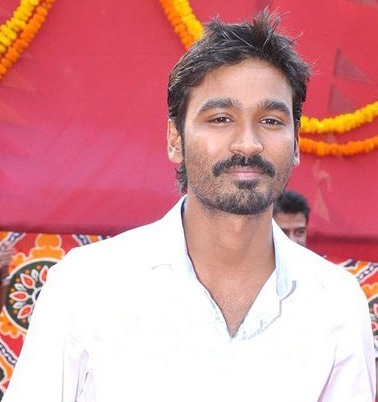
- Dhanush's performance in Aadukalam garnered him several awards and nominations
Accolades
Award	Won	Nominated
Ananda Vikatan Cinema Awards	7	7
Chennai International Film Festival	1	1
The Chennai Times Film Awards	1	1
Filmfare Awards South	5	7
Mirchi Music Awards South	3	3
National Film Awards	6	6
Norway Tamil Film Festival Awards	1	1
South Indian International Movie Awards	4	4
Vijay Awards	5	22
- Total number of awards and nominations (Note: Awards in certain categories do not have prior nominations and only winners are announced by the jury. For simplification and to avoid errors, each award in this list has been presumed to have had a prior nomination.)
Totals	33	52
- References

Aadukalam (transl. Arena) is a 2011 Indian Tamil-language drama film written and directed by Vetrimaaran and produced by S. Kathiresan. Vetrimaaran co-wrote the dialogues with Vikram Sugumaran. The film stars Dhanush and Taapsee Pannu with Kishore, V. I. S. Jayapalan, Naren, and Murugadoss playing supporting roles. The musical score was composed by G. V. Prakash Kumar while the cinematography and editing were respectively handled by Velraj and Kishore Te. The film's story revolves around Karuppu who is the understudy of an experienced cockfighter, Pettaikaran. When Karuppu wins in a cockfight against Pettaikaran's rival Rathnasamy, Pettaikaran, who is initially happy, becomes jealous of Karuppu's newfound popularity and plots his downfall.

Produced on a budget of ₹150-200 million, Aadukalam was released on 14 January 2011 and grossed ₹300 million according to a February 2011 report by The Economic Times. (Note: The average exchange rate in 2011 was 51.10 Indian rupees (₹) per 1 US dollar (US$).) The film garnered awards and nominations in several categories, with particular praise for its direction, screenplay, Dhanush's performance, music, cinematography, and editing. The film has won 33 awards from 52 nominations.

Aadukalam won six awards at the 58th National Film Awards ceremony, thereby sharing the record with Kannathil Muthamittal (2002) for the most number of National Film Awards won by a Tamil film. It won awards under the Best Direction (Vetrimaaran), Best Actor (Dhanush), Best Screenplay (Original) (Vetrimaaran), Best Editing (Kishore Te) and Best Choreography (Dinesh) categories with a Special Jury Award being presented to V. I. S Jayapalan. The film was nominated in seven categories at the 59th Filmfare Awards South, winning Best Film – Tamil (S. Kathiresan), Best Director – Tamil, Best Actor – Tamil, Best Music Director – Tamil (G. V. Prakash Kumar), and Best Cinematographer (Velraj). At the 6th Vijay Awards, it was nominated in twenty-two categories and won in five, including Entertainer of the Year, Best Director and Best Music Director. Among other wins, the film received seven Ananda Vikatan Cinema Awards, four South Indian International Movie Awards, three Mirchi Music Awards, and one Norway Tamil Film Festival Award, Chennai International Film Festival Award, and Chennai Times Film Award each.

== Awards and nominations ==
Award	Date of ceremony (Note: Date is linked to the article about the awards held that year, wherever possible.)	Category	Recipient(s) and nominee(s)	Result	Ref.
Ananda Vikatan Cinema Awards	5 January 2012	Best Film	S. Kathiresan	Won	
Ananda Vikatan Cinema Awards	5 January 2012	Best Director	Vetrimaaran	Won	
Ananda Vikatan Cinema Awards	5 January 2012	Best Story	Vetrimaaran	Won	
Ananda Vikatan Cinema Awards	5 January 2012	Best Cinematographer	Velraj	Won	
Ananda Vikatan Cinema Awards	5 January 2012	Best Editor	Kishore Te	Won	
Ananda Vikatan Cinema Awards	5 January 2012	Best Music Director	G. V. Prakash Kumar	Won	
Ananda Vikatan Cinema Awards	5 January 2012	Best Playback Singer – Male	S. P. Balasubrahmanyam, S. P. B. Charan for "Ayyayyo"	Won	
Chennai International Film Festival	22 December 2011	Best Film	Vetrimaaran	Won	
The Chennai Times Film Awards	22 June 2012	Best Director	Vetrimaaran	Won	
Filmfare Awards South	7 July 2012	Best Film – Tamil	S. Kathiresan	Won	
Filmfare Awards South	7 July 2012	Best Director – Tamil	Vetrimaaran	Won	
Filmfare Awards South	7 July 2012	Best Actor – Tamil	Dhanush	Won	
Filmfare Awards South	7 July 2012	Best Supporting Actor – Tamil	V. I. S. Jayapalan	Nominated	
Filmfare Awards South	7 July 2012	Best Music Director – Tamil	G. V. Prakash Kumar	Won	
Filmfare Awards South	7 July 2012	Best Male Playback Singer – Tamil	G. V. Prakash Kumar for "Yathe Yathe"	Nominated	
Filmfare Awards South	7 July 2012	Best Cinematographer – South	Velraj	Won	
Mirchi Music Awards South	4 August 2012	Best Music Director	G. V. Prakash Kumar	Won	
Mirchi Music Awards South	4 August 2012	Listener's Choice Award − Song	G. V. Prakash Kumar for "Yathe Yathe"	Won (5th place)	
Mirchi Music Awards South	4 August 2012	Listener's Choice Award − Album	G. V. Prakash Kumar	Won (2nd place)	
National Film Awards	9 September 2011	Best Direction	Vetrimaaran	Won	
National Film Awards	9 September 2011	Best Actor	Dhanush (Note: Shared with Salim Kumar for Adaminte Makan Abu.)	Won	
National Film Awards	9 September 2011	Best Screenplay	Vetrimaaran	Won	
National Film Awards	9 September 2011	Best Editing	Kishore Te	Won	
National Film Awards	9 September 2011	Best Choreography	Dinesh	Won	
National Film Awards	9 September 2011	Special Jury Award	V. I. S. Jayapalan	Won	
Norway Tamil Film Festival Awards	20–25 April 2011	Best Choreographer	Dinesh	Won	
South Indian International Movie Awards	21–22 June 2012	Best Director — Tamil	Vetrimaaran	Won	
South Indian International Movie Awards	21–22 June 2012	Best Actor — Tamil	Dhanush	Won	
South Indian International Movie Awards	21–22 June 2012	Best Cinematographer — Tamil	Velraj	Won	
South Indian International Movie Awards	21–22 June 2012	Best Music Director — Tamil	G. V. Prakash Kumar	Won	
Vijay Awards	16 June 2012	Best Film	S. Kathiresan	Nominated	
Vijay Awards	16 June 2012	Best Director	Vetrimaaran	Won	
Vijay Awards	16 June 2012	Best Actor	Dhanush	Nominated	
Vijay Awards	16 June 2012	Best Villain	V. I. S. Jayapalan	Nominated	
Vijay Awards	16 June 2012	Best Music Director	G. V. Prakash Kumar	Won	
Vijay Awards	16 June 2012	Best Debut Actress	Taapsee Pannu	Nominated	
Vijay Awards	16 June 2012	Best Cinematographer	Velraj	Nominated	
Vijay Awards	16 June 2012	Best Art Director	Jacki	Nominated	
Vijay Awards	16 June 2012	Best Male Playback Singer	S. P. Balasubrahmanyam, S. P. B. Charan for "Ayyayo"	Nominated	
Vijay Awards	16 June 2012	Best Male Playback Singer	Velmurugan for "Otha Sollala"	Won	
Vijay Awards	16 June 2012	Best Female Playback Singer	Prashanthini for "Ayyayo"	Nominated	
Vijay Awards	16 June 2012	Best Lyricist	Snehan	Nominated	
Vijay Awards	16 June 2012	Best Story, Screenplay Writer	Vetrimaaran	Nominated	
Vijay Awards	16 June 2012	Best Dialogue	Vikram Sugumaran	Nominated	
Vijay Awards	16 June 2012	Best Choreographer	Dinesh	Nominated	
Vijay Awards	16 June 2012	Best Stunt Director	Rajasekhar	Nominated	
Vijay Awards	16 June 2012	Best Crew	Vetrimaaran	Won	
Vijay Awards	16 June 2012	Entertainer of the Year	Dhanush	Won	
Vijay Awards	16 June 2012	Favourite Hero	Dhanush	Nominated	
Vijay Awards	16 June 2012	Favourite Heroine	Taapsee Pannu	Nominated	
Vijay Awards	16 June 2012	Favourite Director	Vetrimaaran	Nominated	
Vijay Awards	16 June 2012	Favourite Song	"Otha Sollala"	Nominated	

== See also ==
- List of Tamil films of 2011
