= List of people from Cuddalore district =

Cuddalore district is a coastal district in the South Indian state of Tamil Nadu. There are a list of notable people in the district.

- Vallalar, saint
- A. Subbarayalu Reddiar, first Chief Minister of Tamil Nadu
- Vetrimaaran, director of Polladhavan, Aadukalam, Visaranai, Asuran.
- N. S. Ramaswami, journalist
- K. Veeramani
- Er. N. Rajendran, former Chief Engineer National Highways
- Jayakanthan, journalist
- Aswath Damodaran, Professor of Finance at the Stern School of Business at New York
- Kriya Babaji
- V. Vaithilingam, former Chief Minister of Puducherry
- Peter Tranchell, music composer
- Haji Mastan
- Bill Greswell, First Class Cricket Player who played for Somerset
- Vasanth, Indian film director and screenwriter
- Kumar G. Venkatesh, Indian Filmmaker and Indo-Russian Cultural Ambassador
