= Vaathi (soundtrack) =

2023 soundtrack album by G. V. Prakash Kumar

Soundtrack album by G. V. Prakash Kumar
- Released: 3 February 2023
- Recorded: 2022–2023
- Genre: Feature film soundtrack
- Length: 20:01
- Language: Tamil
- Label: Aditya Music
- Producer: G. V. Prakash Kumar

G. V. Prakash Kumar chronology
Sardar (2022)	Vaathi (2023)	Rudhran (2023)

Singles from Vaathi
- 1. "Vaa Vaathi" Released: 10 November 2022; 2. "Nadodi Mannan" Released: 17 January 2023; 3. "Vaa Vaathi (Reprise)" Released: 23 February 2023

Sir

Soundtrack album by G. V. Prakash Kumar
- Released: 15 February 2023
- Recorded: 2022–2023
- Genre: Feature film soundtrack
- Length: 20:20
- Language: Telugu
- Label: Aditya Music
- Producer: G. V. Prakash Kumar

Singles from Sir
- 1. "Mastaaru Mastaaru" Released: 10 November 2022; 2. "Banjara" Released: 17 January 2023; 3. "Mastaaru Mastaaru (Reprise)" Released: 23 February 2023

Vaathi is the soundtrack album to the 2023 period action drama film of the same name directed by Venky Atluri and produced by Sithara Entertainments, Fortune Four Cinemas and Srikara Studios, starring Dhanush and Samyuktha. The film's music is composed by G. V. Prakash Kumar and featured six songs written by Dhanush, Yugabharathi and Arivu. The Telugu version Sir has six songs written by Ramajogayya Sastry, Suddala Ashok Teja and Pranav Chaganty.

The album was preceded by two singles in Tamil and Telugu, and the soundtrack for Vaathi was launched on 3 February 2023, while the soundtrack for Sir was launched a week later. Prakash won the National Film Award for Best Music Direction – Songs for his work in Tamil.

== Background ==
The film's music is composed by G. V. Prakash Kumar in his maiden collaboration with Venky Atluri and sixth collaboration with Dhanush. (Note: Prakash had previously composed for Dhanush's Polladhavan (2007), Aadukalam (2011), Mayakkam Enna (2011), Asuran (2019) and Maaran (2022).) Since the film is set in the 1990s, Prakash developed a soundscape with both acoustic, classical and folk instruments for the film score and songs. Atluri added that despite Prakash's acting commitments, he delivered the songs on time.

== Release ==
The first single titled "Vaa Vaathi" in Tamil and "Mastaaru Mastaaru" in Telugu was released on 10 November 2022. It was written by Dhanush and Ramajogayya Sastry in respective languages, with Shweta Mohan recorded vocals for both languages. The second single titled "Naadodi Mannan" in Tamil and "Banjara" in Telugu was released on 17 January 2023. The Tamil version was written by Yugabharathi and sung by Anthony Daasan, with the Telugu version featuring lyrics by Suddala Ashok Teja and sung by Anurag Kulkarni.

The film's audio launch took place at the Sai Leo Muthu Indoor Stadium, Sri Sai Ram Engineering College in Tambaram, Chennai on 3 February 2023, with the cast and crew amongst other celebrities in attendance. A pre-release event for the Telugu version Sir was held at the People's Plaza in Necklace Road, Hyderabad on 15 February 2023, where the Telugu album was launched.

== Reception ==
Avinash Ramachandran of The New Indian Express called Prakash's score being "mostly loud and moderately effective" while his "songs are used smartly by Venky". Vignesh Vijayakumar of The Week wrote "music director G.V. Prakash Kumar adds soul to the film through his background score". Latha Srinivasan of India Today wrote "G V Prakash's BGM is OK and, with his song Vaathi, already a big hit, the audience enjoys it on screen too."

Bharathy Singaravel of The News Minute wrote "Musically, ‘Naadodi Mannan’ and ‘Va Vaathi’ stand out from GV Prakash's soundtrack. This is one of the times a film's music album is a far better experience than the movie itself." For the Telugu version, Srivatsan Nadathur of OTTPlay wrote "Sir is an uplifting, chirpy album from GV Prakash Kumar and is among the composer’s best in the recent times. He makes his experience count and is aided by a right bunch of singers and lyricists to contribute to the quality."

== Track listing ==
Vaathi (Tamil)
No.	Title	Lyrics	Singer(s)	Length
1.	"Vaa Vaathi"	Dhanush	Shweta Mohan	3:45
2.	"Naadodi Mannan"	Yugabharathi	Anthony Daasan	3:23
3.	"Kalangudhe"	Yugabharathi	Vijay Yesudas	3:28
4.	"One Life"	Dhanush, Arivu	Stephen Zechariah, Arivu	2:47
5.	"Sooriya Paarvaigaley"	Yugabharathi	Tippu, Ravi G	2:54
6.	"Vaa Vaathi (Reprise)"	Dhanush	Dhanush	3:43
Total length:				20:01

Sir (Telugu)
No.	Title	Lyrics	Singer(s)	Length
1.	"Mastaaru Mastaaru"	Ramajogayya Sastry	Shweta Mohan	3:45
2.	"Banjara"	Suddala Ashok Teja	Anurag Kulkarni	3:32
3.	"Maaraajayya"	Ramajogayya Sastry	Kaala Bhairava	3:28
4.	"One Life"	Pranav Chaganty	Hemachandra, Pranav Chaganty	3:03
5.	"Sandhya Na Udayiddaam"	Pranav Chaganty	Anurag Kulkarni	2:55
6.	"Mastaaru Mastaaru (Reprise)"	Ramajogayya Sastry	Dhanush	3:44
Total length:				20:20

== Accolades ==
Award (Note: Awards, festivals and organisations are in alphabetical order.)	Date of ceremony (Note: Date is linked to the article about the awards held that year, wherever possible.)	Category	Recipient(s)	Result	Ref.
Ananda Vikatan Cinema Awards	22 June 2024	Best Female Playback Singer	Shweta Mohan – ("Vaa Vaathi")	Nominated	
Filmfare Awards South	3 August 2024	Best Music Director – Tamil	G. V. Prakash Kumar	Nominated	
Filmfare Awards South	3 August 2024	Best Female Playback Singer – Telugu	Shweta Mohan – ("Mastaaru Mastaaru")	Won	
IIFA Utsavam	27 September 2024	Best Female Playback Singer – Tamil	Shweta Mohan – ("Vaa Vaathi")	Nominated	
National Film Awards	1 August 2025	Best Music Direction (Songs) – Tamil	G. V. Prakash Kumar	Won	
South Indian International Movie Awards	15 September 2024	Best Female Playback Singer – Tamil	Shweta Mohan – ("Vaa Vaathi")	Nominated	
South Indian International Movie Awards	15 September 2024	Best Female Playback Singer – Telugu	Shweta Mohan – ("Mastaaru Mastaaru")	Nominated	
