= Visaranai =

2015 Indian film by Vetrimaaran

- Theatrical release poster
- Directed by: Vetrimaaran
- Screenplay by: Vetrimaaran
- Based on: Lock Up by M. Chandrakumar
- Produced by: Dhanush
- Starring: Dinesh; Anandhi; Samuthirakani; Murugadoss; S Rathnasamy; Kishore; Pradheesh Raj
- Cinematography: S. Ramalingam
- Edited by: Kishore Te. Co-editor; G. B. Venkatesh
- Music by: G. V. Prakash Kumar
- Production companies: Wunderbar Films; Grass Root Film Company
- Distributed by: Lyca Productions
- Release dates: 12 September 2015 (Venice); 5 February 2016 (India)
- Running time: 118 minutes
- Country: India
- Language: Tamil

Visaranai (transl. Interrogation) is a 2015 Indian Tamil-language crime drama film written and directed by Vetrimaaran. The film was produced by Dhanush under his banner Wunderbar Films. It is based on the novel Lock Up by M. Chandrakumar. The film stars Dinesh, Anandhi, Samuthirakani, Aadukalam Murugadoss, Kishore, Pradheesh Raj, and Silambarasan Rathnasamy. The background score was composed by G. V. Prakash Kumar. The film deals with the lives of two men before and after being thrown into a kafkaesque scenario in which they get tortured for confession. Vetrimaaran later told that, in the beating sequences in the film, the actors were really beaten (which was criticized by some of the foreign media and a member of Golden Globes during the film's Oscar campaign), and all of them had to undergo counselling sessions.

The film premiered in the Orizzonti (Horizons) section of the 72nd Venice Film Festival, where it won the Amnesty International Italia Award. The film was released in India on 5 February 2016 and received critical acclaim from both critics and audience but faced controversy regarding its portrayal of the Tamil Nadu police force. At the 63rd National Film Awards, the film won three honours: Best Feature Film in Tamil, Best Supporting Actor for Samuthirakani and Best Editing for Kishore Te. It was selected as India's official entry for the Best Foreign Language Film at the 89th Academy Awards but it was not nominated. At the 64th Filmfare Awards South, the film was nominated for the Best Film, Best Director for Vetrimaaran and won the award for the Best Supporting Actor for Samuthirakani.

== Plot ==
Pandi, Murugan, Afzal, and Kumar are Tamil labourers working in Guntur, Andhra Pradesh and living in a nearby park and working to make ends meet. A Tamil man named Muthuvel is shown to be undertaking some operation in Andhra Pradesh along with a group of men. The lives of the four labourers take a turn for worse when they are caught, beaten and tortured brutally in police lock-up for a theft that they did not commit, due to police's need to close a high-profile robbery case. The four resist the torture and refuse to confess but are forced to relent due to the police brutality. However, when produced in court, they speak out the true set of events to the judge. Muthuvel, who is shown to be a police inspector, helps them go free by translating for them in court and vouching for them. Before the men can leave, Muthuvel enlists their help to kidnap a high-profile auditor named KK who has surrendered in the same court. It is shown that Muthuvel's police team had come there unofficially to nab KK before he surrendered. Since Muthuvel's team are closely watched by KK's lawyers inside the court, Muthuvel gives the 4 men a task to bring KK out of the court. Muthuvel's seniors use their influence to make the court police aid them and KK is kidnapped by the 4 men. The men are brought back to Tamil Nadu, and Kumar is dropped on the way to Chennai. The remaining three men are asked by Muthuvel to clean the police station before leaving. The nature of Muthuvel's case is then revealed.

The kidnapping was masterminded by the Deputy Commissioner (DCP), under directions from the top brass of the ruling political party of the state, to use KK in court and take down the President of the opposition party, since general elections are merely 5 months away. Meanwhile, the Assistant Commissioner (ACP), who is on the payroll of the opposition party, convinces the DCP to play a double game and get three crores (30 million) rupees from the opposition for dropping the case. However, buying the DCP's bluff, the opposition party fears that KK has given up their secrets and orders the ACP to interrogate him, during which he dies from the injuries sustained. Since the death happened in Muthuvel's station when Muthuvel was on charge, he and his men take KK's body to KK's beach house and set up his death as suicide by hanging. Later, a discussion ensues to figure out a way to get the bribe and to cover up the death as a suicide.

After the meeting, the DCP sees Pandi and Afzal cleaning in an adjoining bathroom and suspects that they might have overheard the plan. To cover up, they decide to frame Pandi and his friends as convicts in a pending ATM robbery case, and eliminate them under the cover of an encounter. Muthuvel, who feels responsible for the three men, is fed up with the corruption and immorality of the events that have transpired and initially refuses to cooperate, but he is coerced because of his deep involvement. During the staged encounter, Afzal is killed, causing Pandi and Murugan to run away. In the ensuing pursuit, Murugan is shot and killed. Muthuvel chases Pandi and negotiates with him, assuring no harm and promising a spot in front of the media to expose the corruption. Meanwhile, orders arrive from the DCP to tie up loose ends and eliminate Muthuvel as well. As the film cuts to black, gunshots are heard, followed by a conversation that reveals the deaths of both Muthuvel and Pandi. A plan is made for the press coverage of Muthuvel's death 'in the line of duty', alongside photographs of his family to hold the attention and sympathy of the public.

In the epilogue it is shown that this film is based on the novel written by real-life Kumar, who has been felicitated by multiple human rights organisations.

== Cast ==
- Attakathi Dinesh as Pandi
- Murugadoss as Murugan
- Samuthirakani as Muthuvel
- Kishore as K. K.
- E. Ramdoss as Ramachandran
- Ajay Ghosh as Vishveshwara Rao
- Anandhi as Shanthi
- Silambarasan Rathnasamy as Afzal
- Pradheesh Raj as Kumar
- Misha Ghoshal as Sindhu
- Saravana Subbiah as Saravanan
- Halwa Vasu
- Munnar Ramesh as Ramesh
- Dhaya Senthil as Neethipathi
- Vettai Muthukumar as Rathnasamy
- Cheran Raj as Goule
- Supergood Subramani

== Music ==
Visaranai

Film score by G. V. Prakash Kumar
- Released: 2016
- Genre: Feature film soundtrack
- Producer: G. V. Prakash Kumar

G. V. Prakash Kumar chronology
Eetti (2015)	Visaranai (2016)	Theri (2016)

The background score for Visaranai was composed by G. V. Prakash Kumar, marking another collaboration with director Vetrimaaran following their previous work on Polladhavan (2007) and Aadukalam (2011).

== Production ==
The film was adapted from the novel titled Lock up, written by M. Chandrakumar, an auto rickshaw driver in Coimbatore. Vetrimaaran chose to begin the film before the schedule for his other venture Vada Chennai (2018) and signed up actors Attakathi Dinesh and Aadukalam Murugadoss to play convicts in the film. The film earlier had a working title Kutravaali. The director initially described it as an experimental film lasting only 60 minutes. Anandhi joined the cast after Vetrimaran was impressed with her performance in his production venture, Poriyaalan (2014) and Prabhu Solomon's Kayal (2014). Ajay Ghosh stated that he played the role of an inspector in the film and would appear throughout the first half.

== Release ==
Visaranai was released in theatres on 5 February 2016. The film had its television premiere on 10 October the same year on Star Vijay.

== Critical reception ==
On the review aggregator website Rotten Tomatoes, 100% of 7 critics' reviews are positive, with an average rating of 8.5/10.

This film received the best movie award from Tamil magazine Ananda Vikatan in Ananda Vikatan Cinema Awards 2016. Twitch Film viewed Visaranai as a top class film about reality comparable to 2012 Cannes favourite Gangs of Wasseypur.

Baradwaj Rangan wrote for The Hindu, "Visaranai is beautifully filmed, though there isn't much room for beauty. The frames appear to have been snatched from the back alleys of life. The verité illusion is aided by the utterly lifelike performances—even if the word "performance" seems wrong.". S Saraswathi of Rediff wrote "Director Vetrimaaran deserves credit for having extracted the best from all his actors. They are so remarkable you sense their terror as they stutter and stumble with their broken and bruised bodies. The hard-hitting screenplay is relentless, making no effort to shield you from the harsh realities of the ruthless world we live in today."

Overseas, The Hollywood Reporter wrote "Vetri Maaran’s tense socio-political thriller lands a well-aimed punch at rampant police brutality and corruption, to which the only response from the viewer is towering indignation. It may not break new ground in its subject or style of narration, but it covers the old ground extremely well, and its premise is so convincing and realistic that it seems like non-fiction. The first part, at least, is non-fiction, while the film’s second half turns into a fast-paced thriller...Maaran and Kumar extend the horror to include the upper echelons in the police and government, who also need scapegoats to cover their crimes. This mirror plot becomes an ever more threatening nocturnal thriller, and takes the film much wider in terms of potential audience."

== Awards and nominations ==
Award	Category	Nominee	Result	Ref.
72nd Venice International Film Festival	Orizzonti Prize (Horizons Award for Best Film)	Vetrimaaran	Nominated	
72nd Venice International Film Festival	Amnesty International Italia Award	Vetrimaaran	Won	
63rd National Film Awards	Best Feature Film in Tamil	Vetrimaaran; Dhanush	Won	
63rd National Film Awards	Best Supporting Actor	Samuthirakani	Won	
63rd National Film Awards	Best Editing	Kishore Te	Won	
Ananda Vikatan Cinema Awards	Best Film	Vetrimaaran; Dhanush	Won	
Ananda Vikatan Cinema Awards	Best Direction	Vetrimaaran	Won	
Ananda Vikatan Cinema Awards	Best Screenplay	Vetrimaaran	Won	
Ananda Vikatan Cinema Awards	Best Editing	Kishore Te	Won	
Ananda Vikatan Cinema Awards	Best Supporting Actor	Samuthirakani	Won	
64th Filmfare Awards South	Best Film – Tamil	Vetrimaaran; Dhanush	Nominated	
64th Filmfare Awards South	Best Director – Tamil	Vetrimaaran	Nominated	
64th Filmfare Awards South	Best Supporting Actor – Tamil	Samuthirakani	Won	

== See also ==
- List of submissions to the 89th Academy Awards for Best Foreign Language Film
- List of Indian submissions for the Academy Award for Best Foreign Language Film
