= Cockfighting in India =

Animal fighting game in India

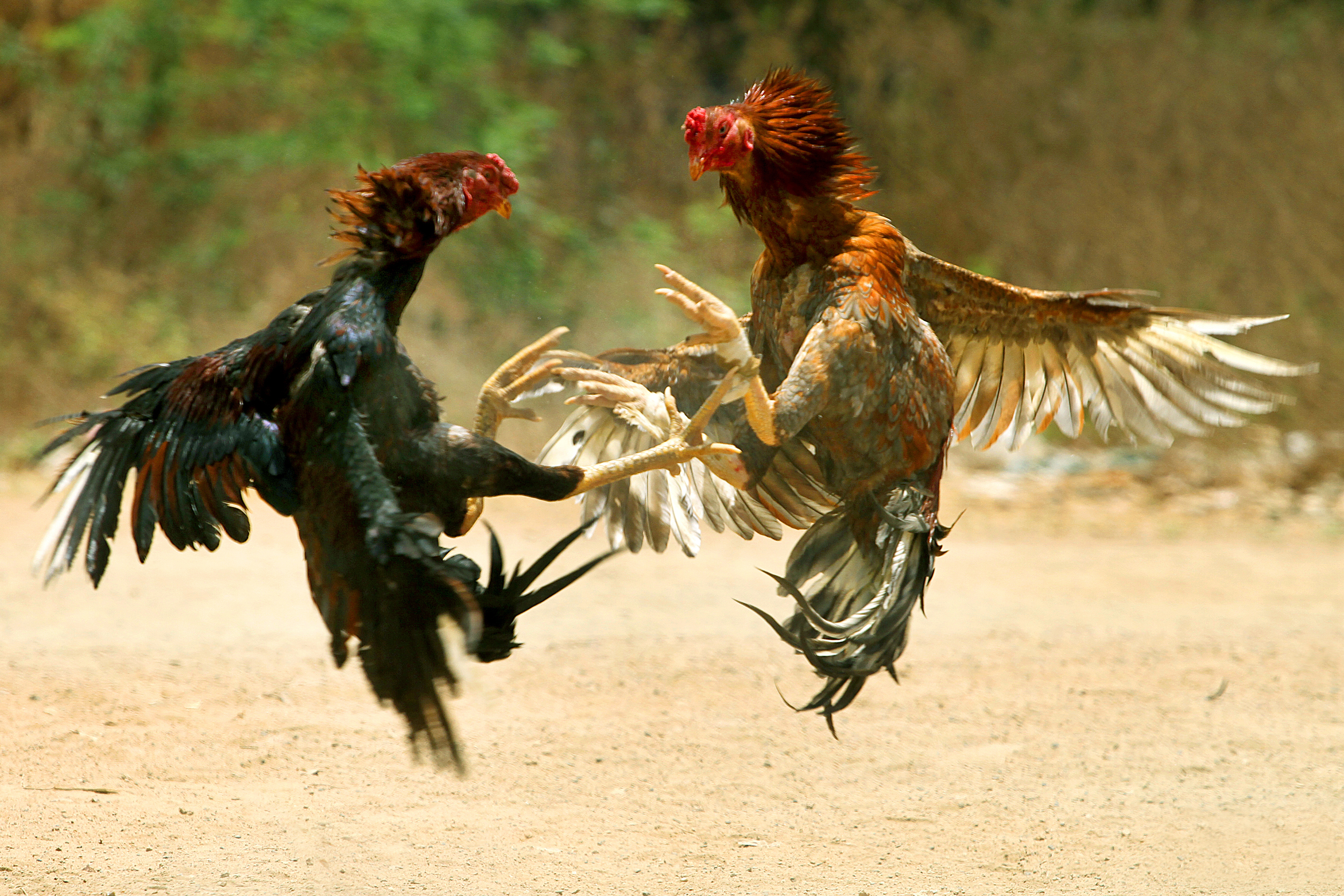
Cockfight in Tamil Nadu, India

Cockfighting (Kodi Pandem in Telugu, Seval Sandai in Tamil) in India primarily takes place in January, coinciding with the festival of Sankranti. The practice is widespread in coastal districts of Andhra Pradesh, including Krishna, Guntur, East Godavari and West Godavari districts, despite being illegal in India.

== Overview ==
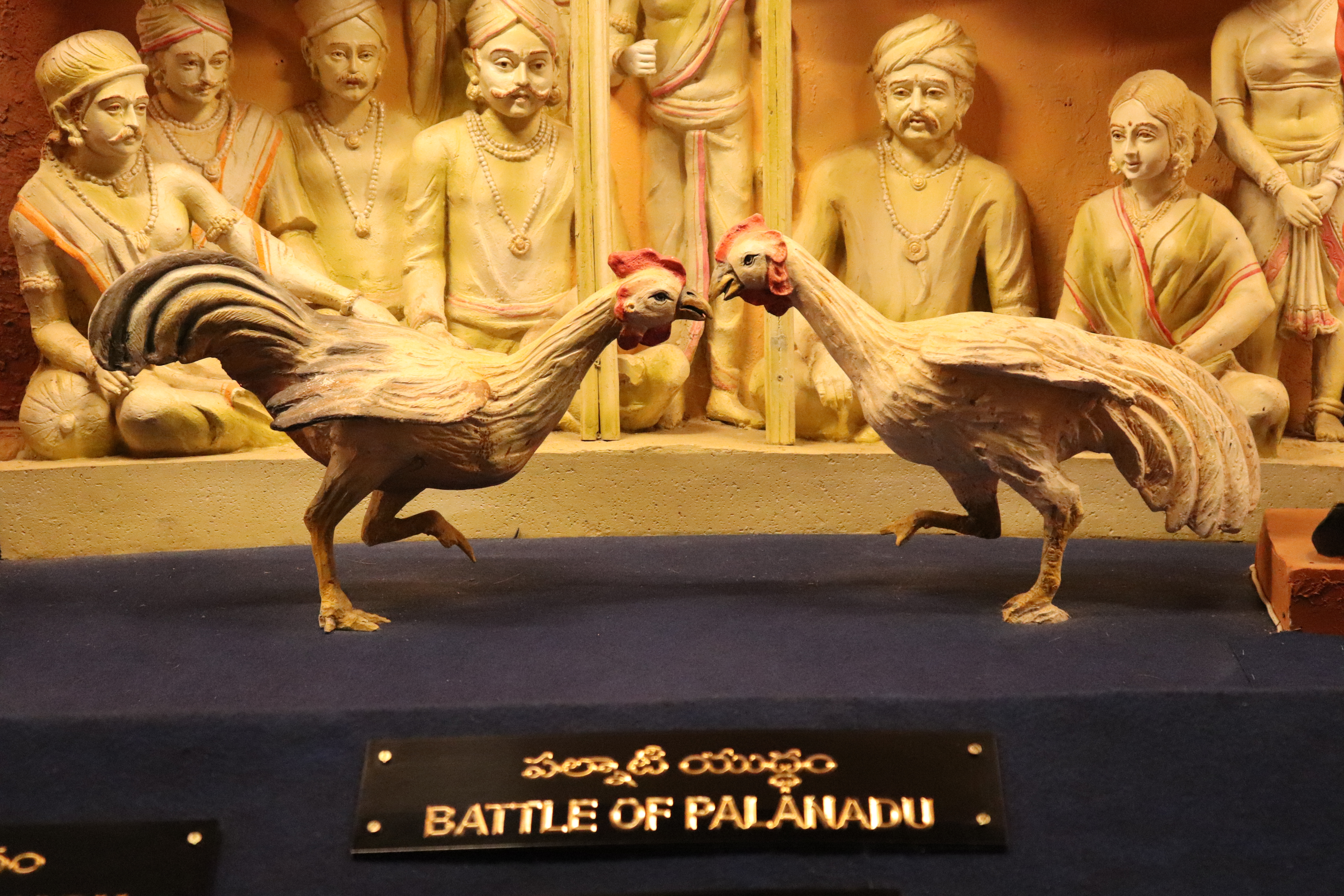
Sculpture depicting cockfighting during the Battle of Palnadu

Fights between birds such as junglefowls and roosters are said to have been arranged in ancient India as a mode of entertainment. It is recorded that the outcome of the Battle of Palnadu (1178–1182) was decided by a rooster fight, following which cockfighting gained foothold in Andhra Pradesh.

In the present day, cockfighting takes place in Andhra Pradesh and other parts of India such as Telangana, Karnataka, and Odisha.

Roosters are specially bred for cockfights, with knives and blades tied to their legs. The fight typically results in the death of one of the birds. Roosters are trained for fights year-round and are worth as much as ₹50,000 (US$520). Events which can last as long as three days are organized during Sankranti, with each event drawing thousands of people. In a 2019 investigation, The Washington Post called the practice the "Super Bowl of cockfighting".

== History ==
Cockfighting is an ancient spectator sport. There is evidence that cockfighting was a pastime in the Indus Valley Civilization. The Encyclopædia Britannica (2008) holds:

The sport was popular in ancient times in India, China, Persia, and other Eastern countries and was introduced into Ancient Greece in the time of Themistocles (c. 524–460 BC). For a long time the Romans affected to despise this "Greek diversion", but they ended up adopting it so enthusiastically that the agricultural writer Columella (1st century AD) complained that its devotees often spent their whole patrimony in betting at the side of the pit.

Based on his analysis of a Mohenjo-daro seal, Iravatham Mahadevan speculates that the city's ancient name could have been Kukkutarma ("the city [-rma] of the cockerel [kukkuta]"). However, according to a recent study, "it is not known whether these birds made much contribution to the modern domestic fowl. Chickens from the Harappan culture of the Indus Valley (2500–2100 BC) may have been the main source of diffusion throughout the world." "Within the Indus Valley, indications are that chickens were used for sport and not for food" (Zeuner 1963) and that by 1000 BC they had assumed "religious significance".

== Kukkuta Sastra ==
Kukkuta Sastra (transl. Cock Science) is a shastra dealing with cockfighting. There is no information about the author or when the book is written.

Kukkuta Sastra recognises 50 types of cocks suitable for cockfighting. It prescribes the diet for the cocks raised for cockfighting, including but not limited to almond, cashew, pistachio, and meat. Kukkuta Sastra is diligently followed when cocks are raised for cockfighting in India.

== Ban ==
Cockfighting has been illegal in India since the enactment of Prevention of Cruelty to Animals Act in 1960. Subsequent judgements by the Supreme Court of India in 2015, and the Hyderabad High Court in 2016, upheld the ban. In January 2018, the Supreme Court allowed the sport to be held in a traditional way, without the use of knives and blades and without gambling or betting.

Despite the ban, cockfighting is still popular in Andhra Pradesh, with an estimated amount over ₹900 crore (US$93 million) being wagered in the state during a three-day period in 2019. More than 200,000 roosters have been used in cockfights in the state.

== Incidents ==
- In 2010, in West Midnapore of the state of West Bengal, a man was killed by his rooster, which pierced his neck with a blade attached to its leg.
- In 2019, in Pragadavaram, Andhra Pradesh, a spectator succumbed to the injuries inflicted by a rooster. It reportedly sunk the blade tied to its leg into his abdomen during a cockfight.
- In 2021, in Telangana state, the owner of a rooster fitted with a blade was killed after it impaled him in the groin as he attempted to recapture it after an escape attempt.

== Popular culture ==
- The 2001 Malayalam film Kannaki directed by Jayaraj is a reimagining of the play Antony and Cleopatra told in the background of cockfighting tournaments in Kerala.
- The plot of the 2011 Tamil language- film Aadukalam directed by Vetrimaran is centred around cockfights.
