= Vijay Award for Best Director =

Award category

The Vijay Award for Best Director is given by Tamil television channel STAR Vijay as part of its annual Vijay Awards ceremony for Tamil (Kollywood) films.

== The list ==
Here is a list of the award winners and the films for which they won.

Year	Director	Film	Link
2017	Pushkar-Gayathri	Vikram Vedha	
2014	Karthik Subbaraj	Jigarthanda	
2013	Bala	Paradesi	
2012	Balaji Sakthivel	Vazhakku Enn 18/9	
2011	Vetrimaaran	Aadukalam	
2010	Vasanthabalan	Angadi Theru	
2009	Bala	Naan Kadavul	
2008	M. Sasikumar	Subramaniyapuram	
2007	Vetrimaran	Polladhavan	

== Nominations ==
- 2007 Vetrimaaran - Polladhavan
  - Ameer - Paruthiveeran
  - Radha Mohan - Mozhi
  - Ram - Katrathu Tamil
  - Venkat Prabhu - Chennai 600028
- 2008 M. Sasikumar - Subramaniyapuram
  - Gautham Vasudev Menon - Vaaranam Aayiram
  - Myshkin - Anjathey
  - Radha Mohan - Abhiyum Naanum
  - Sasi - Poo
- 2009 Bala - Naan Kadavul
  - Cheran - Pokkisham
  - Pandiraj - Pasanga
  - Priyadarshan - Kanchivaram
  - Samudrakani - Naadodigal
- 2010 Vasanthabalan - Angadi Theru
  - A. L. Vijay - Madrasapattinam
  - Gautham Vasudev Menon - Vinnaithaandi Varuvaayaa
  - Prabu Solomon - Mynaa
  - Seenu Ramasamy - Thenmerku Paruvakaatru
- 2011 Vetrimaaran - Aadukalam
  - A. Sarkunam - Vaagai Sooda Vaa
  - M. Saravanan - Engaeyum Eppothum
  - Santha Kumar - Mounaguru
  - Thiagarajan Kumararaja - Aaranya Kaandam
- 2012 Balaji Sakthivel - Vazhakku Enn 18/9
  - A. R. Murugadoss - Thuppakki
  - Magizh Thirumeni - Thadaiyara Thaakka
  - Prabhu Solomon - Kumki
  - S. S. Rajamouli - Naan Ee
- 2013 Bala - Paradesi
  - Balu Mahendra - Thalaimuraigal
  - Kamal Haasan - Vishwaroopam
  - Suseenthiran - Pandiya Naadu
  - Ram - Thanga Meenkal
- 2014 Karthik Subbaraj - Jigarthanda
  - Mysskin - Pisasu
  - Pa. Ranjith - Madras
  - R. Parthiepan - Kathai Thiraikathai Vasanam Iyakkam
  - Vijay Milton - Goli Soda

== See also ==
- Tamil cinema
- Cinema of India
