= Rudhran =

2023 Indian Tamil action thriller film by S. Kathiresan

- Theatrical release poster
- Directed by: S. Kathiresan
- Written by: K. P. Thirumaaran
- Produced by: S. Kathiresan
- Starring: Raghava Lawrence; R. Sarathkumar; Priya Bhavani Shankar
- Cinematography: R. D. Rajasekhar
- Edited by: Anthony
- Music by: Songs: G. V. Prakash Kumar; Dharan Kumar; OfRo; Score: Sam C. S.
- Production company: Five Star Creations LLP
- Release date: 14 April 2023
- Running time: 153 minutes
- Country: India
- Language: Tamil
- Box office: est. ₹10 crore

Rudhran is a 2023 Indian Tamil-language action thriller film film, produced and directed by S. Kathiresan from a script by K. P. Thirumaaran. The film, which marks S. Kathiresan's directorial debut, stars Raghava Lawrence and R. Sarathkumar, alongside Priya Bhavani Shankar, Nassar, Poornima Bhagyaraj, Kaali Venkat, Ilavarasu, Redin Kingsley and Sharath Lohitashwa. The score was composed by Sam C. S., while the soundtrack was composed by G. V. Prakash Kumar, Dharan Kumar and OfRo.

Rudhran was released theatrically on 14 April 2023, coinciding with Puthandu, to mixed-to-negative reviews from critics, with criticism directed towards the screenplay, writing, and fight sequences, but the social message, music and Lawrence's performance were praised. The film became a box office bomb.

== Plot ==
Rudhran, an IT professional, lives a happy life with his parents Devaraj and Indhira in Chennai. He falls in love with Ananya, a lab technician, who later reciprocates his feelings. Devaraj, a transport agency owner, helps his friend Das get a loan of ₹6 crore from moneylender Ethiraj. However, Das cheats Devaraj by absconding with the loan, and Devaraj dies upon learning this. After Rudhran and Ananya get married, Rudhran leaves for London to settle the financial issues. Ananya becomes pregnant and gives birth to a daughter, Anya. Ananya and Anya spend time with Rudhran in London. Rudhran tells her to see his mother, and Ananya goes back to Chennai.

One day, Rudhran hears about Indhira's sudden death and Ananya's disappearance, and he travels to Chennai and carries out Indhira's funeral rites. Rudhran and Shakthi investigate Ananya's disappearance, where they meet a cab driver who had picked Ananya up from the airport. However, the driver gets killed by a motorcycle gang. Rudhran captures one of the gang members and arrives at his hideout, where he sees Varadha, whom he met at Indira's funeral. Varadha is the leader of the motorcycle gang. Rudhran tortures Varadha to reveal the truth.

Past: In 2007, Varadha and Bhoomi were recidivists in Pollachi. Pandian bailed them out and informed them of a criminally ingenious idea. A group took fingerprints of parents whose children had gone abroad and usurped their properties and land. Bhoomi worked with Subbiah, a wealthy landlord whose son is in America. Eventually, Pandian, Varadha and Bhoomi injected Subbiah, leading to his death from a heart attack. Pandian then strangled Subbiah's son, killing him, and then Pandian usurped his property and got crores of money. One night, as Pandian, Bhoomi, and Varadha celebrated, Bhoomi murdered Pandian because he wanted Subbiah's property for his own sake. Bhoomi then bribed the inspector who investigated their murders and developed his syndicate network. Bhoomi's gang targeted and injected older parents whose children travelled abroad.

After a 100-crore business deal, he targeted Rudhran's mother. After Shakthi and his wife Deepika left, Varadha and his gang entered Indhira's house and eventually killed her.

Present: Rudhran becomes furious after learning this and impales Varadha. However, Bhoomi arrives with his men and attacks Shakthi and Rudhran, where Guna, Bhoomi's henchman, hangs Shakthi to death. Bhoomi reveals that he told Varadha and his gang to kill Ananya after she arrived at Indhira's house. Bhoomi stabs Rudhran, burns the factory, and leaves Rudhran to his death, but Constable Narasimhan saves Rudhran. Distraught over his family's death, Rudhran begins his violent crusade, where he kills Sasi at a container depot.

Rudhran later kills Guna at an under-construction building. Bhoomi realizes that Rudhran is after him and tells Ganga to hire Maari to kill Rudhran. Maari attacks Rudhran and Anya at a festival in Tirukalukundram, but Rudhran kills Maari and his men. Rudhran and Bhoomi confront each other at the Kala Bairavaa temple. Rudhran kills Bhoomi's men, including Ganga, and an intense fight ensues between Bhoomi and Rudhran. Rudhran finally kills Bhoomi by injecting the same serum, which Bhoomi used to kill the parents, thus avenging his family's death.

A few years later, Rudhran runs a charitable trust under Indhira's name, where he tracks down Das in Madurai and thrashes him to avenge Devaraj's death, indicating a sequel.

== Cast ==
- Raghava Lawrence as Rudhran
- R. Sarathkumar as Bhoominathan (Bhoomi)
- Priya Bhavani Shankar as Ananya Rudhran, Rudhran's wife
- Nassar as Devaraj, Rudhran's father
- Poornima Bhagyaraj as Indhrani Devaraj, Rudhran's mother
- Sharath Lohithaswa as Varadha, Bhoomi's friend
- Kaali Venkat as Shakthi, Rudhran's friend
- Sambhavi Gurumoorthy as Deepika Shakthi, Ananya's friend and Shakthi's wife
- Ilavarasu as Constable Narasimhan
- Redin Kingsley as Sketch
- Thangadurai as Pencil
- Jayaprakash as SP Jagannathan
- A. Venkatesh as Ethiraj, a moneylender
- Hareesh Peradi as Pandian, a lawyer
- Thennal Abhilash as Anya, Rudhran and Ananya's daughter
- Jayakumar as Das
- Rajesh as Subbiah
- Stun Siva as Guna, Bhoomi's goon
- Abhishek Vinod as Ganga, Bhoomi's goon
- Shivajith as Sasi, Bhoomi's goon
- Neelima Rani as Doctor
- George Maryan as a Cab Driver
- Sai Dheena as Shankar
- Deepa Shankar as Karpagam, a police officer
- Janani Ashok Kumar as Sasi's wife (uncredited)
- M. Kamaraj as Maari, Bhoomi's henchman
- Pradeep K Vijayan as Rudhran's manager
- Shyam Prasad as Suresh, Subbiah's son
- Boys Rajan as Doctor
- Sugunthan as Johnny
- Kadugu Ramamoorthy
- Silmisham Siva

== Production ==
Rudhran marks the directorial debut for producer S. Kathiresan and the second collaboration between Raghava Lawrence and R. Sarathkumar after their first venture Kanchana. The first look poster for the film was released on 23 June 2022. A promotional glimpse of the film was released on 29 October 2022. Shooting of the film was wrapped up on 5 March 2023.

== Music ==
Rudhran

Soundtrack album by G. V. Prakash Kumar, Dharan Kumar, and OfRo Background Score: Sam C. S.
- Released: 2023
- Recorded: 2022–2023
- Genre: Feature film soundtrack
- Language: Tamil
- Labels: Saregama; Hariharan Audio
- Producers: G. V. Prakash Kumar, Dharan Kumar, Sam C. S., OfRo

G. V. Prakash Kumar chronology
Vaathi (2023)	Rudhran (2023)	Modern Love Chennai (2023)

Sam C. S. chronology
Michael (2023)	Rudhran (2023)	Thiruvin Kural (2023)

Dharan Kumar chronology
Aruvaa Sanda (2022)	Rudhran (2023)

OfRo chronology
College Road (2022)	Rudhran (2023)	DD Returns (2023)

The songs of the film were composed by G. V. Prakash Kumar, while the remix version of the song "Paadatha Pattellam" from Veera Thirumagan was recreated by Dharan Kumar, who also collaborated with singers Sathyaprakash and Nithyashree Venkataramanan previously for Carvaan Lounge Tamil segment. The song "Jorthaale" which was composed by OfRo and featuring lyrics from singer Asal Kolaar back in 2021, was re-used for this film and it was released to digital streaming platforms as fourth single of the film's album. Sam C. S. composed the background score for the film.

Track listing
No.	Title	Lyrics	Music	Singer(s)	Length
1.	"Paadatha Pattellam"	Kannadasan	Dharan Kumar	Sathyaprakash, Nithyashree Venkataramanan, Emcee D	4:47
2.	"Pagai Mudi"	Karunakaran	G. V. Prakash Kumar	Diwakar	4:30
3.	"Unnodu Vaazhum"	Kabilan	G. V. Prakash Kumar	Sid Sriram	4:58
4.	"Jorthaale"	Asal Kolaar	OfRo	Asal Kolaar, OfRo, MC Vickey	3:32
5.	"Enna Petha Ammave"	Madhurakavi	G. V. Prakash Kumar	G. V. Prakash Kumar	4:59
6.	"Kanaana Kanmani"	Snehan	G. V. Prakash Kumar	Balaji Sri	3:33
7.	"Uyira Udala"	Gnanakaravel	G. V. Prakash Kumar	Balaji Sri	5:07
Total length:					30:06

== Release ==
The film was earlier schedule to release on 23 December 2022, but was postponed due to a delay in the VFX works. The film was released on 14 April 2023, coinciding with Puthandu.

=== Home media ===
The digital rights were bought by Sun NXT, while the satellite rights were sold to Sun TV.

== Reception ==
Rudhran received mixed to negative reviews from critics.

=== Critical response ===
ABP Nadu gave 3/5 stars and wrote "Raghava Lawrence's movie is 100% entertainment guarantee so you can go to the theater and watch this movie once with your family.". Logesh Balachandran of The Times of India gave 2.5/5 stars and wrote "Rudhran is just another rehash of many action entertainers in Tamil cinema."

Thinkal Menon of OTTplay gave 2/5 stars and wrote "Raghava Lawrence's enthusiasm and Sarath Kumar's menacing antagonist's role come across as huge relief in this below average potboiler that offers nothing new". Shameena Parveen of Samayam gave 2/5 stars and criticized its length.

Janani. K of India Today gave 1/5 stars and wrote "The story deals with a conflict that has the potential to be developed into a full-fledged crime story, but the filmmaker decided to do away with that and delve into melodrama instead. The final result is a film that hardly has anything new and interesting to offer." Bharathy Singaravel of The News Minute gave 1/5 stars and wrote "With a stereotypically tragic backstory, extreme violence, and an utterly unconvincing hero, the film would have perhaps worked better if marketed as a parody."

Ananda Vikatan noted it as a "time pass film". Kalyani Pandiyan. S of Hindustan Times wrote "The film has all the features of a commercial film. Everything has worked out well except the action." Gopinath Rajendran of The Hindu wrote "Rudhran is an excruciating watch that brings nothing new to the table and tries to capitalise on the tropes that had worked for ages, only to fail because of the same reason."
