= Annanukku Jai (2018 film) =

2018 Indian Tamil-language film

- Theatrical release poster
- Directed by: Rajkumar
- Produced by: Vetrimaaran
- Starring: Dinesh; Mahima Nambiar
- Cinematography: Vishnu Rangasamy
- Music by: Arrol Corelli
- Production companies: Fox Star Studios; Grass Root Film Company
- Distributed by: Fox Star Studios
- Release date: 31 August 2018
- Running time: 113 minutes
- Country: India
- Language: Tamil

Annanukku Jai is a 2018 Indian Tamil-language political satire film directed by Rajkumar and produced by Vetrimaaran. The film stars Dinesh and Mahima Nambiar. The music was composed by Arrol Corelli, while the film released on 31 August 2018.

== Plot ==
A toddy seller's son decides to becomes a politician in order to exact revenge against a bar owner who humiliated his father. However, things do not go as planned.

== Cast ==
- Dinesh as Matta Sekar
- Mahima Nambiar as Sundari
- Radha Ravi as Parasuraman
- Mayilsamy as Murugesan nadar
- Vaiyapuri as Narayanan
- Sriranjani as Parasuraman's wife
- Anjali Rao as Veni
- Sai Dheena as Selva pandi(Selva)
- Ramachandran Durairaj
- Munnar Ramesh
- Radha as Sekar's mother
- Hari Krishnan as Anaconda Moorthy
- Tiger Garden Thangadurai as Anand
- Supergood Subramani as Subba Rao
- Pangu as Vijayamuthu
- Balambika as Sundari's mother
- Vijayamuthu as Selva's henchman
- Meeran Mitheen as Damodaran
- Pattabi as Pattabi
- Dhanasekar
- TSR

== Production ==
In December 2014, Dhanush and Vetrimaaran announced that they would jointly produce a new film titled Annanukku Jai starring Dinesh, which would be directed by debutant Rajkumar. Later in the month, the team also agreed terms with Mahima Nambiar to play the film's lead actress. However, the producers dropped the film and progress remained stagnant throughout 2015. Dinesh began working on the film again in February 2016.

== Critical reception ==
Vishal Menon of The Hindu wrote, "It may have its flaws but the film packs just enough to keep things moving. Even otherwise, it’s a film you can watch for Dinesh alone…because it’s a joy to watch this actor cry". M. Suganth of The Times of India wrote that "where the film scores the most is in the subtle ways in which it takes a dig at politics".
