= Jigarthanda (2014 film) =

2014 Indian film by Karthik Subbaraj

- Theatrical release poster
- Directed by: Karthik Subbaraj
- Written by: Karthik Subbaraj
- Produced by: S. Kathiresan
- Starring: Siddharth; Lakshmi Menon; Bobby Simha
- Cinematography: Gavemic U. Ary
- Edited by: Vivek Harshan
- Music by: Santhosh Narayanan
- Production companies: Group Company; Shri Meenakshi Creations
- Release date: 1 August 2014
- Running time: 171 minutes
- Country: India
- Language: Tamil

Jigarthanda (transl. Cold-heart) is a 2014 Indian Tamil-language gangster comedy film written and directed by Karthik Subbaraj and produced by S. Kathiresan. The film stars Siddharth, Lakshmi Menon and Bobby Simha, with Karunakaran and Aadukalam Naren in pivotal roles. Set primarily in Madurai, it revolves around an aspiring filmmaker who decides to research a gangster named Assault Sethu, but must do so discreetly due to Sethu's ruthlessness.

The film was reported to be inspired by the 2006 South Korean film A Dirty Carnival. Filming took place between June and November 2013. Gavemic U. Ary was the cinematographer, and Vivek Harshan was the editor. Santhosh Narayanan composed the songs and background score.

Jigarthanda was released on 1 August 2014. The film became a commercial success and won two National Film Awards: Best Supporting Actor (Simha) and Best Editing (Vivek Harshan). Simha also won the Filmfare Award for Best Supporting Actor – Tamil. It was remade in Kannada with the same title (2016), in Telugu as Gaddalakonda Ganesh (2019), and in Hindi as Bachchhan Paandey (2022). A prequel, titled Jigarthanda DoubleX, was released in 2023.

== Plot ==
Short film director Karthik Subramani participates in a talent show in order to make his first feature film and reaches the semifinal round. The judges are Mukil, a highbrow film director who derides Karthik's attempt at filmmaking, and Sundar, a profit-oriented film producer who thinks that Karthik made the best film among the contestants. Following a heated argument between Mukil and Sundar, Karthik is eliminated from the contest, but Sundar offers to produce a film with him as the director.

The next day, Karthik visits Sundar, who is uninterested in Karthik's ideas for a film, and instead suggests making a gangster film. Karthik decides to document the life of Assault Sethu, a gangster based in Madurai and make a screenplay out of it.

Karthik travels to Madurai and enlists the help of a college friend Oorani to conduct surveillance on Sethu and his men. To get closer to Sethu, Karthik also puts up an act of reciprocating the love of Kayalvizhi, whose mother cooks for Sethu. They eventually arouse the suspicion of Sethu's right-hand men Rasu and Senthil, who put the underling Sounder to surveil them.

Karthik plants a wireless microphone in a music player and lends it to Sounder. Because of this, Sounder is busted as a mole for a rival gang and killed by Sethu who also manages to kill the rival gang's leader Sekar. Sethu finds the microphone and locates Karthik and Oorani. Karthik confesses that he was planning to make a film about Sethu. Sethu is enamoured by the prospect of being the subject of a film and initiates Karthik and Oorani into his gang.

Sethu and his gang take Karthik along for their criminal activities. Karthik documents everything. When he is ready to leave Madurai to work on the screenplay, Kayal discovers that Karthik used her for information. During a send-off party for Karthik, a vengeful Kayal remarks that Sethu should play himself in the film. He listens and threatens Karthik into directing the film with Sethu playing himself on screen. Karthik tries to flee from Madurai but is caught by Sethu's gang. They also kidnap Sundar and force both men to make the film. Karthik soon learns that Sethu and his men cannot act in front of a camera. He hires acting coach Muthu, to no avail.

After production of the film, A. Kumar, is wrapped, Sethu and his men create great fanfare for its release. During the first showing, however, Sethu is shocked. Realising that a serious gangster film featuring Sethu would not succeed, Karthik had surreptitiously changed the story into a comedy. The film was edited and dubbed in a way that shows Sethu as a man who achieves everything in life by crying. The film's "A" initial is revealed to stand for Azhuguni (Crybaby), not Assault as Sethu believed.

The audience laughs all throughout the film. Furious, Sethu searches for Karthik, who, with the rest of the crew, has gone into hiding. While searching for them, Sethu realises that the fear that people have for him does not equal respect. He finds that through Soundar's wife and her daughter who make him realise that by making people laugh through his film, he has earned true respect. For example, his mother, who has not spoken to him since he became a gangster, speaks to Sethu again after seeing the film and Sethu even visits the theatre one more time to watch his film and realises about what true respect really is when he sees the audience enjoying his film. Sethu and Karthik eventually meet by accident, as Karthik is en route to deliver recordings of Sethu's boastful confessions to the police. Sethu forgives Karthik, who chooses to put Sethu's past behind him and let him seek a new life.

Years later, Karthik, now an experienced director, uses Sethu's gang to intimidate Vijay Sethupathi into acting in his film, as Kayal, now Karthik's wife, is a fan of him. Elsewhere, Sethu is a full-time actor, has married Soundar's widow Ganga, and dotes on her toddler daughter.

== Cast ==
- Siddharth as Karthik Subramani
- Lakshmi Menon as Kayalvizhi "Kayal"
- Bobby Simha as Assault Sethu
- Vijay Sethupathi as himself (cameo appearance)
  - Sethupathi also portrays young Assault Sethu
- Nassar as Mukil
- Karunakaran as Oorni
- Aadukalam Naren as Sundar
- Ambika as Kayalvizhi's mother
- Sangili Murugan as "Petti Kadai" Pazhani
- Delhi Ganesh as Subramani
- Sudha as Karthik's mother
- Bombay Gnanam as Karthik's grandmother
- Ajay Rathnam as Police Officer
- Munnar Ramesh as Sellur Murugan
- Bala Singh as Shanmugam
- Thennavan as Sekhar
- Guru Somasundaram as Muthu
- S. P. Gajaraj as Santhanam
- Ramachandran Durairaj as Rasu
- Bagavathi Perumal as Magesh
- Rajkumar as Prasath
- Kaalaiyan as Senthil
- Senthil Kumaran as Sounder
- Anthony Daasan as Vettu Kumar (guest appearance)
- Bava Lakshmanan as Secretary
- Vinodhini Vaidyanathan as Ganga
- Thangadurai as Sivanesan
- Nalan Kumarasamy as an aspiring director (guest appearance)
- Vetrimaaran as himself (guest appearance)
- Baba Bhaskar (special appearance in the song "Baby"; uncredited)

== Production ==
=== Development ===
In mid-April 2013, actor Siddharth announced that he would be working in a Tamil film to be directed by Karthik Subbaraj. Karthik echoed the same shortly thereafter, noting that although the script was complete, the rest of the film's cast and the title were not yet finalised. The title Jigarthanda, derived from a beverage popular in Madurai, was announced in June 2013. The title's etymology was defined by Karthik who deconstructed it into its root words, which collectively meant "cold-blooded" or "cold-hearted". Tuney John was chosen as the publicity designer. Jigarthanda was intended to be Karthik's feature directorial debut, but was stalled due to budget constraints, he instead made his feature debut with Pizza (2012), made on a fraction of the budget planned for Jigarthanda. Karthik incorporated some of his experiences during his life at Madurai into Jigarthanda. Gavemic U. Ary was the cinematographer, making his debut in Tamil cinema.

=== Casting ===
In an interaction with IANS in early March 2014, Siddharth expressed hope that Jigarthanda would help him break away from the stereotypical "boy-next-door" and "chocolate boy" roles he was known for and allow him to showcase his versatility. In late May 2013, Lakshmi Menon revealed that she was a part of the film's cast. The actress later stated, "I have put in a lot of effort for my role as an idli seller in the film. I visited a few idli shops in Madurai before the shoot and geared up for my character". It was reported in mid-July 2013 that Vijay Sethupathi would play the antagonist, but it was later confirmed that he would do only a cameo for his "mentor" Karthik. However, in 2022, Karthik confirmed that Sethupathi was indeed considered for the antagonist, and the character's name Assault Sethu was in fact a reference to Sethupathi. Sethupathi briefly portrays Sethu in flashback sequences, and himself in the present.

Bobby Simha was eventually cast as Sethu, with Karthik stating, "I decided not to cast anyone who we thought was an obvious choice for the role, including Vijay Sethupathi. After seeing his performance in Neram, in which Bobby played a gangster, we thought that if we do a complete makeover, he could crack it". Simha said that he interacted with real gangsters in preparation for the role. In 2023, Raghava Lawrence said he was supposed to do the role but could not due to unforeseeable reasons. Guru Somasundaram was cast as the acting coach Muthu after Simha recommended him to the director. Karthik wanted Mani Ratnam to make a cameo as himself, but he and the producer were unable to contact him; instead, another director Vetrimaaran appeared as himself.

=== Filming and post-production ===
Principal photography started on 12 June 2013 at Madurai, and wrapped in November 2013. Karthik, along with sound designers Vishnu Govind and Sreesankar, sound mixer Rajakrishnan, and Dolby consultant Dwarak Warrier. S. Venkatraghavan, Cinema Sales Manager — South at Dolby Laboratories, in an interview with Baradwaj Rangan confirmed that the film would feature Dolby Atmos sound system for realistic effect in sounds. About the usage of Dolby Atmos for a small film which is also a romantic comedy, Karthik said, "Initially, I thought Jigarthanda would not involve as much work as Pizza. But slowly I found that there was much more work to be done here; there were many live locations and we even shot candid in some places. We needed to recreate all that ambience". Rajakrishnan added that it took a month for the sound mixing process.

== Music ==
Santhosh Narayanan recorded the music for the film along with his newly launched Sandy's Jazz Band. While Santhosh, besides composing, played the keyboard, Australian musicians Hamish Stuart and Graham Jesse played the drums and the saxophone, respectively, and Leon James and Naveen, both from Chennai, played the electronic piano and guitar respectively. Santhosh also worked with a street band from Tanjore to record one song from the film. He also introduced independent musicians, Pradeep Kumar, Sean Roldan, Anthony Daasan, Mani, Kalyani Nair to work with the film's soundtrack. The album features nine numbers of different genres, which includes fusion, folk and rap, with two instrumentals, one of them being performed by the composer's Sandy Jazz band.

The audio rights were purchased by Think Music. The official track list of the film was published on 1 March 2014. The complete soundtrack album was launched on 3 March 2014 at Sathyam Cinemas in Chennai. A live band performance of Anthony Daasan took place and theatrical trailer of the film was screened at the event.

== Marketing ==
The first look teaser of Jigarthanda was released on 9 February 2014 which received positive response and got more than 0.3 million views in 3 days. The first theatrical trailer was revealed at the film's audio launch on 3 March 2014, which was well received. The second official trailer was released on 17 July 2014. The film's Telugu dubbing rights were bought by Suresh Kondeti and V. Rami Reddy. It was later dubbed into that language under the title Chikkadu Dorakadu, and released in 2016.

== Release ==
Jigarthanda was given a U/A certificate by the censor board due to its violent content. Producer S. Kathiresan, however, wanted a U certificate to avail entertainment tax exemption, and sought to cut the violent sequences, which Karthik did not agree to. After arriving at an agreement, the film remained uncut and retained its U/A certificate; the release date was fixed as 25 July 2014. However, later that month there were reports that the film would release either on 27 July or 31 July. Siddharth denied those reports and confirmed 25 July as the release date. He eventually came to know that the film was indeed postponed, and he used his official Twitter handle to express his frustration on not being informed of the same.

Kathiresan released a press statement explaining the postponement of Jigarthanda to 1 August was due to the successful run of Velaiyilla Pattathari, and theatre owners requested for the postponement of Jigarthanda by a week to secure more screens. Tamil Film Producers Council member T. Siva criticised Siddharth, stating that actors are getting paid for acting, and should not involve or discuss the release of their films.

== Reception ==
=== Critical reception ===
M. Suganth of The Times of India gave 4 stars out of 5 and wrote, "If Pizza was a con movie dressed up as a haunted house horror thriller, Jigarthanda is basically a comedy cloaked as a gangster movie....[The] subversive streak is what makes this film singular and reinforces that Karthik Subbaraj as one of the exciting filmmakers of our time". Anupama Subramanian of the Deccan Chronicle gave 3.5 stars out of 5 and wrote, "Aided by his entire cast and technical department, breaking the myth that promising debut filmmakers may not fare in their next, Karthik Subbaraj clearly proves that he is here to stay". J Hurtado of ScreenAnarchy gave a positive review and said, "'Jigarthanda' is a worldly film that takes influences from within its own very small cinematic orb and transforms them into something that the discerning film fan can meditate on and enjoy. Will the general non-Tamil film fiend miss a few jokes? Yes, quite a lot, actually. However, Jigarthanda manages to make universal that which is culturally specific; it's really quite an accomplishment".

Haricharan Pudipeddi of IANS gave 3.5 stars out of 5 and wrote, "If the purpose of Jigarthanda was to deliver a tight slap on the face of the system, it has succeeded in it. Thanks to the impeccable performances of the lead cast, especially Simha, director Subbaraj has conveniently conned us into seeing his film as a gangster flick-turned-comedy caper". S. Saraswathi of Rediff gave the film 3.5 stars out of 5 and concluded, "Jigarthanda is an engrossing gangster film with a series of bizarre twists and turns that keeps you guessing" and added that the film was "definitely a must watch". Sify wrote, "Karthik Subbaraj with Jigarthanda has delivered another interesting and intriguing film. It is bold and cannot be slotted into any genre. All ingredients associated with commercial cinema are mixed and served efficiently, though the dish itself becomes cold by the end". Sundar Sarukkai of Outlook said that "the movie effortlessly makes you think that the other side of being bad is just a cinema away in all of us.", and rated the movie 3 out of 5.

In contrast, Gautaman Bhaskaran of the Hindustan Times gave the film 2 stars out of 5 and wrote, "If Subbaraj wanted to send a moral through his work – shed no blood – Jigarthanda flounders in a maze of 1960s kind of explanatory dialogues, and images that confound, and these despite fine performances by Simha (great expressions and body language) and Karunakaran as Karthik's sidekick. As for Siddharth, his just about manages to look bewildered, and all the time". Baradwaj Rangan gave a mixed review for The Hindu, writing, "Scene for scene, Jigarthanda is fresh and alive and cracklingly inventive, and there are stupendous stretches of comedy. But the two films – the gangster movie and the meta movie – never really cohere".

=== Box office ===
Jigarthanda's opening day gross in Tamil Nadu was ₹4 crore (equivalent to ₹7.0 crore or US$720,000 in 2026). The film collected around ₹10 crore (equivalent to ₹17 crore or US$1.8 million in 2026) in Tamil Nadu in its first weekend. According to Sify, it was one of the most successful Tamil films of the year based on return on investment.

=== Accolades ===
At the 62nd National Film Awards, Jigarthanda won the Best Supporting Actor (Simha) and Best Editor (Vivek Harshan) awards. Simha also won the Filmfare Award for Best Supporting Actor – Tamil, the film's only nomination at the 62nd Filmfare Awards South. At the 4th South Indian International Movie Awards, it received 7 nominations in the Tamil branch: Best Film, Best Director (Karthik), Best Actor (Siddharth), Best Actress (Menon), Best Supporting Actor and Best Actor in a Negative Role (both Simha), and Best Cinematographer (Gavemic U. Ary); the sole winner was Simha for Best Supporting Actor. He also won the Tamil Nadu State Film Award Special Prize for Best Actor.

== Remakes ==
Jigarthanda was remade in Kannada under the same title in 2016. Despite the release of a dubbed Telugu version in 2016, it was remade in the same language as Gaddalakonda Ganesh (2019). The film was also remade Hindi as Bachchhan Paandey (2022).

== Legacy ==
Prior to the release, Forbes India ranked the film on the fifth spot in its 5 Indian Films to see in India 2014 list, published on 31 December 2013. In 2019, Film Companion ranked Simha's performance on the 100 Greatest Performances of the Decade. The same year, Bakshi Singh of Film Companion ranked the film's posters on #2 in the Top 10 Indian Movie Posters of the Decade.
