= Naiyaandi =

2013 Indian film by A. Sarkunam

- Theatrical release poster
- Directed by: A. Sarkunam
- Written by: A. Sarkunam
- Produced by: S. Kathiresan
- Starring: Dhanush; Nazriya Nazim
- Cinematography: R. Velraj
- Edited by: Raja Mohammad
- Music by: Ghibran
- Production company: Five Star Films
- Release date: 11 October 2013
- Running time: 142 minutes
- Country: India
- Language: Tamil

Naiyaandi (transl. Satire) is a 2013 Indian Tamil-language romantic action comedy film written and directed by A. Sarkunam. The film stars Dhanush and Nazriya Nazim. An unofficial remake of the 1993 Malayalam film Meleparambil Anveedu, it focuses on the love between a kuthuvilakku shop owner and a dental student.

Naiyaandi was produced by S. Kathiresan, scored by Ghibran, photographed by R. Velraj and edited by Raja Mohammad. Principal photography took place between February and September 2013, with Kumbakonam as the primary filming location. The film was released on 11 October 2013.

== Plot ==
Chinna Vandu runs a kuthuvilakku shop. His elder brothers Paranjothi and Paranthavan are not yet married, despite their advanced age. Chinna Vandu, who studied in his uncle's son's home, falls in love with Vanaroja, a dental student who comes there to visit her grandmother and see the village festival. Chinna Vandu finds many ways to make Vanaroja fall in love, such as making her laugh, but she still does not fall in love with him. During the village festival, Vanaroja's ring goes missing, so her father Poongavanam comes there and tells everyone to find the ring for a reward of ₹1 lakh (equivalent to ₹1.9 lakh or US$2,000 in 2026). Only Chinna Vandu finds it in front of Vanaroja, but he gives the ring to a poor lady to claim the prize, as Vanaroja does not like him. Seeing this, Vanaroja falls in love with him.

Chinna Vandu makes a challenge to himself: to know whether Vanaroja is in love or not. He gets to know that Vanaroja is also in love with him. Vanaroja leaves the village to her home but upon reaching, she finds her father has arranged her engagement with Krishna and has scheduled her marriage with Krishna on her birthday. Chinna Vandu comes to wish her for her birthday on that night and learns of the engagement. They both escape from Krishna and his henchmen.

Chinna Vandu tells his cousin Soori he has eloped with Vanaroja and asks him to come and meet them. Soori tries to find a way for Chinna Vandu to live with Vanaroja, but Chinna Vandu tells him he has already married her. Soori tells them to hide their marriage and go to his family in Kumbakonam. Soori brings Vanaroja to Chinna Vandu's house, saying she is an orphan. His family accepts her in, but Chinna Vandu's brothers start to love Vanaroja.

Chinna Vandu gets a shock of his life when his father decided to marry Vanaroja to Paranjothi. Vanaroja is shocked too and she argues with Chinna Vandu about the problem and urges him to reveal the truth to his parents, he somehow he manages to pacify her and they make love and from that he makes sure his brothers do not marry her. After some days, their mother finds that Vanaroja is pregnant and expels her from the house. Meanwhile, Krishna's men find Vanaroja and kidnap her. Chinna Vandu finds Vanaroja captured by Krishna and follows him. He goes in a fight and wins, but Chinna Vandu is caught by his whole family, and his father Sambandham does not accept this, but Poongavanam comes and tells Sambandham that his daughter's life needs to be happy, and so finally he accepts their relationship.

== Cast ==
- Dhanush as Chinna Vandu
- Nazriya Nazim as Vanaroja
- Vamsi Krishna as Krishna
- Soori as Soori
- Sriman as Paramjothy, Chinna Vandu's elder brother
- Sathyan as Parandhaman, Chinna Vandu's second elder brother
- Pyramid Natarajan as Sambandham, Chinna Vandu's father
- Meera Krishnan as Chinna Vandu's mother
- Aadukalam Naren as Poongavanam, Vanaroja's father
- Sachu as Vanaroja's grandmother
- Sathish as Chinna Vandu's friend
- Ashvin Raja as Chinna Vandu's friend
- Imman Annachi as Tea Shop Owner
- Manobala as Astrologer
- Charle as Parandhaman's friend
- Singampuli

== Production ==
In May 2012, A. Sarkunam said Dhanush had agreed to star in his then forthcoming film, though the producer was not yet finalised. The film, initially titled Sotta Vazhakutty, was retitled Naiyaandi by January 2013. In the same month, the filmmakers decided in on Nazriya Nazim as Dhanush's pair. The film was produced by S. Kathiresan, photographed by R. Velraj and edited by Raja Mohammad. Principal photography began on 13 February, and wrapped that September. The film was predominantly shot in Kumbakonam, and to a lesser extent in Thanjavur and Pollachi. Two song sequences were shot in Switzerland.

== Soundtrack ==
The soundtrack album was composed by Ghibran, and released on 19 September 2013. The single "Teddy Bear" was released on 17 September, two days before the full album. The song uses dubstep elements and sounds inspired by those in 8-bit video games. In a review of the album, Karthik of Milliblog wrote, "Ghibran proves that he owns the most exciting sound in Tamil, in recent times!".

Track listing
No.	Title	Lyrics	Singer(s)	Length
1.	"Ae Le Le Etti Paarthale"	Arivumathi	Leon D'Souza, Sundar Narayana Rao	4:48
2.	"Inikka Inikka"	Karthik Netha	Suzanne D'Mello, Padmalatha, Nivas, Sofia Symphony Orchestra	3:58
3.	"Marriage Marketil"	Ve. Ramaswamy	Sundar Narayana Rao	3:11
4.	"Munnadi Pora Pulla"	Karthik Netha	Divya Kumar, Shweta Mohan, Gold Devaraj	4:17
5.	"Yendi Paathagathi"	Devendran	Gold Devaraj	1:21
6.	"Teddy Bear"	Viveka	Dhanush	3:50
Total length:				21:25

== Release ==
Naiyaandi was originally scheduled to release on 10 October 2013, but was shifted by a day. The film had its television premiere in mid-April 2014 on Sun TV, during the week of Puthandu.

== Critical reception ==
Baradwaj Rangan wrote for The Hindu, "Naiyaandi slavishly follows the Kollywood formula, with thoroughly exaggerated characters whom we see only on screen" and called the film a "vile mess". Sify wrote, "Naiyaandi is not astounding but it is not a damp squib like most draft comedies we’ve had in recent times". M. Suganth of The Times of India gave 2.75 out of 5 stars and wrote "Naiyandi is a leisurely-paced film, a genteel comedy set in a small town, revolving around a romance. But what sets it apart, in a rather unfortunate way from [Sarkunam's] earlier films, is that this time, the characters and scenes are less interesting, and the tone and rhythm of the film inconsistent". Gautaman Bhaskaran of Hindustan Times wrote, "Naiyaandi is a silly romp through school-boyish pranks, juvenile romantic inclinations, choreographed fights and a yawn of a story".

S. Saraswathi of Rediff.com gave 1.5 out of 5 stars and wrote that the film "lacks a good story and seems more like an amateur, half-hearted and a disappointing attempt" and called it a "disaster". S. Viswanath of Deccan Herald wrote "the slapstick comedy works in bits and parts. It suffers from a weak storyline and a sorry script". Indo-Asian News Service gave 1.5 out of 5 and wrote, "Naiyaandi is a mistake every talented actor commits in his career. This one belongs to Dhanush, who has majorly disappointed one and all".

== Controversies ==
Ahead of the film's release, Nazriya condemned the filmmakers for shooting some scenes of her character using a body double without her knowledge, with the woman's hip being rubbed, and the tummy/navel area being fully exposed, noting this violated her contract. She filed a complaint with the Chennai Police Commissioner against Sarkunam, demanding that the director show the film to her before its release. She withdrew the complaint after the scene that she had objected to was removed.

Although Sargunam acknowledged the 1993 Malayalam film Meleparambil Anveedu as an influence on Naiyaandi, in November 2013, Mani C. Kappan, the producer of the Malayalam film, accused him of plagiarism. Kappan added that he had planned to remake Meleparambil Anveedu in Hindi and the release of Naiyaandi weakened this opportunity.
