= Indha Crime Thappilla =

2023 Tamil film

- Theatrical release poster
- Directed by: Devakumar
- Starring: Pandi Kamal; Meghana Ellen; Aadukalam Naren
- Music by: Parimala Vasan
- Production company: Madhurya Productions
- Release date: 6 October 2023
- Country: India
- Language: Tamil

Indha Crime Thappilla (transl. This crime is not wrong) is a 2023 Indian Tamil-language crime film directed by Devakumar and starring Pandi Kamal, Meghana Ellen and Aadukalam Naren in the lead roles. It was released on 6 October 2023.

== Cast ==
- Pandi Kamal
- Meghana Ellen
- Aadukalam Naren
- Muthukaalai
- Vengal Rao
- Karpagavalli

== Production ==
Production on the film began in early 2021 under the title of Naan Vera Maathiri, before undergoing a name change. Promotions for the film began in September 2023.

== Reception ==
The film was released on 6 October 2023 across theatres in Tamil Nadu. A critic from Maalai Malar gave the film a negative review, noting that the "story was fine but the screenplay was disappointing". A reviewer from Dina Thanthi noted that the filmmaker "failed to properly covey the film's message".
