= S. Kathiresan =

Indian film producer and director

- Born: Chennai, Tamil Nadu, India
- Occupations: Film producer; Film director
- Website: Official website

S. Kathiresan is an Indian film producer and film director who has worked on Tamil films. He made his debut production with Polladhavan in 2007 and debuted direction with Rudhran. He owns the production company, Five Star Creations.

== Career ==
S. Kathiresan was born in Chennai. He made his debuted production with Vetrimaaran's direction Polladhavan (2007) starring Dhanush. The film was received positive responses from the audience and went on to become a super hit. In 2011 Kathiresan made his second collaboration with Vetrimaaran starring Dhanush's Aadukalam. This was later released by Sun pictures which was a all time Block buster bagging six national awards.

2013, Kathrisan made 3rd collaboration with Dhanush and produced Naiyaandi which was a disaster at the box office. Later,Karthik Subbaraj direction Jigarthanda (2014) was produced. The film Jigarthanda (2014 film) was given a U/A certificate by the Indian Censor Board due to its violent content. Producer Kathiresan, however, wanted a U certificate to avoid problems while selling the satellite rights of the film, for which the violent sequences were demanded to be cut short, which Karthik Subbaraj did not agree to. Due to the conflict, the film's release got further delayed, but the movie became a blockbuster.

He made his debut direction with Raghava Lawrence starring Rudhran.The film was released in 2023 and was a disaster.

== Filmography ==
Year	Title	Producer	Director	Ref.
2007	Polladhavan	Yes	No	
2011	Aadukalam	Yes	No	
2013	Naiyaandi	Yes	No	
2014	Jigarthanda	Yes	No	
2022	Diary	Yes	No	
2023	Rudhran	Yes	Yes	
2023	Jigarthanda DoubleX	Yes	No	
TBA	Adhigaaram †	Yes	No	
