= Aruvaa Sanda =

2022 Tamil language drama film

- Theatrical release poster
- Directed by: Aadhirajan
- Produced by: V. Raja
- Starring: V. Raja; Malavika Menon
- Cinematography: Santhosh Pandi
- Edited by: V. J. Sabu Joseph
- Music by: Dharan Kumar
- Production company: White Screen Production
- Release date: 30 December 2022
- Running time: 128 minutes
- Country: India
- Language: Tamil

Aruva Sanda is a 2022 Indian Tamil-language action drama film directed by Aadhirajan and starring V. Raja, Malavika Menon and Aadukalam Naren in the lead roles. It was released on 30 December 2022.

== Plot ==
Muthu, a kabaddi player falls in love with Ramya. Their relationship has a tragic end due to honor killing.

== Cast ==
- V. Raja as Muthu
- Malavika Menon as Ramya
- Saranya Ponvannan as Valli
- Aadukalam Naren
- Ganja Karuppu
- G. Marimuthu
- Soundararaja
- Kadhal Sukumar
- Vijay TV Sarath
- Bayilvan Ranganathan
- Nellai Siva
- Madurai Sujatha

== Production ==
The film began production in mid-2017, with the makers initially planning a release in early 2018. Aadhirajan made his third film after Silandhi (2008) and Ranatantra (2016), and cast the film's producer, kabaddi player V. Raja in the lead role, alongside Malavika Menon. Saranya Ponvannan and Aadukalam Naren were signed on to portray other pivotal roles. During the shoot in August 2017, Soundararaja injured Raja with a sickle by accident.

In March 2018, the High Court stayed the film's release owing to apparent financial fraud by V. Raja.

== Reception ==
The film was released on 30 December 2022 across Tamil Nadu. A reviewer from Dina Malar noted that the director had created an engaging film about caste violence, A critic from Dina Thanthi also gave the film a middling review.
