= Aadukalam Naren =

Indian actor (born 1970)

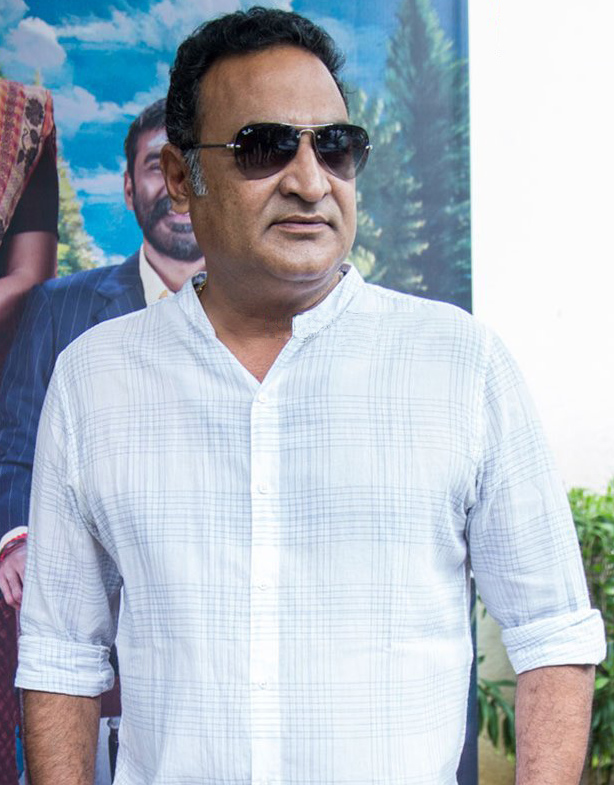
- Naren at the audio launch for Asuran
- Born: Narayanan; 17 October 1970 (age 55); Chennai, India
- Occupation: Actor
- Years active: 1997–present

Aadukalam Naren (born Narayanan) is an Indian actor who has appears in Tamil and Telugu films, mainly playing supporting and antagonistic roles. He made his debut with the 1997 film Raman Abdullah but got noticed for his role in the 2011 film Aadukalam and has since added the film's title as a prefix to his stage name.

== Career ==
Naren appeared in Balu Mahendra's television series Kathai Neram. He played small roles before getting noticed for his role in Aadukalam (2011). He has frequently collaborated with the film's lead actor Dhanush in the latter's later films such as Naiyaandi (2013), Asuran (2019), Maaran (2022), and Vaathi (2023).

Naren has played supporting roles in several films, including Mugamoodi (2012), Arrambam (2013), Thirudan Police (2014), Enakkul Oruvan (2015), and Bairavaa (2017). He has played negative roles in Megha (2014) and Kathar Basha Endra Muthuramalingam (2023). He also played the titular role in the film Veeraiyan (2017).

Naren has collaborated with director Karthik Subbaraj in films such as Pizza (2012), Jigarthanda (2014), Petta (2019), and Mahaan (2022).

Naren has acted in Telugu films such as Agnyaathavaasi (2018), Tuck Jagadish (2021), and Bhagavanth Kesari (2023).

== Filmography ==
=== Tamil films ===
Year	Title	Role	Notes
1997	Raman Abdullah	Henchman	
1998	Thayin Manikodi	Politician	
1999	Suriya Paarvai	Kannan	
2003	Julie Ganapathi	Julie's husband	
2003	Indru	Ramprasad's henchman	
2007	Mirugam	Villager	
2008	Arai En 305-il Kadavul	Coffee shop owner	
2008	Satyam	Pandi	
2008	Anjathe	a kidnapped girl's father	
2009	Vannathupoochi		
2011	Aadukalam	Rathnasamy	
2011	Yuddham Sei	Chandramouli	
2011	Nanjupuram	Velu's father	
2011	Osthe	Alexander	
2012	Nanban	Ramakrishnan	
2012	Manam Kothi Paravai	Revathy's father	
2012	Saguni	Boopathi's assistant	
2012	Pizza	Shanmugam	
2012	Sundarapandian	Kandamanoor Raghupathi Thevar	
2012	Kozhi Koovuthu		
2012	Mugamoodi	Anand's father	
2012	Kasi Kuppam		
2013	Udhayam NH4	Prabhu's brother-in-law	
2013	Sundaattam	Bhagya Annachi	
2013	Moondru Per Moondru Kadal	Prisoner	
2013	Masani	Devanna Gounder	
2013	Yamuna		
2013	All in All Azhagu Raja	Kandasamy (Kutil Star)	
2013	Desingu Raja	Idhayakani's father	
2013	Arrambam	Sriram Raghavan	
2013	Naiyaandi	Poongavanam	
2014	Oru Kanniyum Moonu Kalavaanikalum	Narasimhan	
2014	Veeran Muthuraakku		
2014	Pappali		
2014	Idhu Kathirvelan Kadhal	Kathirvelan's father	
2014	Eppodhum Vendraan		
2014	Jigarthanda	Film Producer Sundar	
2014	Sarabham	Chandrasekar	
2014	Megha	Joseph Fernando	
2014	Aadama Jaichomada	Film Producer	
2014	Poriyaalan	Construction company boss	
2014	Vilaasam	Pandian	
2014	Thirudan Police	Commissioner	
2014	Kaadu	Forest Officer	
2014	Vellaikaara Durai	Police	
2015	Enakkul Oruvan	Durai	
2015	Kallappadam	Thangapandi	
2015	Agathinai	Karthika's father	
2015	Vethu Vettu		
2015	Rajathandhiram	Dharmaraj	
2015	Nanbargal Narpani Mandram		
2015	Yagavarayinum Naa Kaakka	Krishnan	
2015	Inimey Ippadithan	Ekambaram	
2015	Guru Sukran		
2015	Vaalu	Devaraj	
2015	Jippaa Jimikki	Krishik's father	
2015	Puli	Pavazhamalli's father	
2015	Om Shanti Om	Lingesan	
2015	Eetti	Coach	
2015	Vellaiya Irukiravan Poi Solla Maatan	Periyavar	
2016	Azhagu Kutti Chellam	Jayan's father	
2016	Gethu	DSP	
2016	Aranmanai 2	Mahalingam	
2016	Kanithan	Ramalingam	
2016	Nayyapudai	Karthikeyan	
2016	Thozha	Police Inspector	
2016	Uyire Uyire	Priya's father	
2016	Guhan		
2016	Katha Solla Porom	Anitha's father	
2016	Velainu Vandhutta Vellaikaaran	Marudhamuthu	
2016	Uchathula Shiva	Albert	
2016	Remo	Kavya's father	
2017	Bairavaa	Malarvizhi's father	
2017	Bogan	Vikram's father	
2017	Yeidhavan	Karna	
2017	Keikraan Meikkiran		
2017	Sathriyan	Vijayan	
2017	Thangaratham		
2017	Adhagappattathu Magajanangalay		
2017	Neruppu Da	Commissioner	
2017	Thupparivaalan	ACP Paul	
2017	Veeraiyan	Veeraiyan	
2018	Veera	Boxer Rajendran	
2018	Iravukku Aayiram Kangal	Naren Vaidyanathan	
2018	Semma Botha Aagathey	Kerala Police	
2018	Roja Maaligai		
2018	Ghajinikanth	Ramanathan	
2018	Kattu Paya Sir Intha Kaali	senior police officer	
2018	U Turn	Chandrasekhar	
2018	Genius	Ramamoorthy	
2018	Thuppakki Munai	Mohan	
2018	Silukkuvarupatti Singam	Police commissioner Panneerselvam	
2018	Maari 2	Police commissioner	
2019	Petta	Gnanam	
2019	Gangs of Madras	Deputy Commissioner Ramachandran	
2019	Natpuna Ennanu Theriyuma		
2019	Ayogya	Karnan's advocate	
2019	100	Police commissioner	
2019	Gurkha	Nataraj IPS	
2019	Comali	Ravi's father	
2019	En Kaadhali Scene Podura		
2019	Namma Veettu Pillai	Ayyanar's maternal uncle	
2019	Aruvam	Jyothi's father	
2019	Asuran	Vaddakuran Narasimhan	
2020	Psycho	Deputy Superintendent of Police	
2020	Maayanadhi	Kowsalya's father	
2020	Biskoth	Dharmarajan	
2020	Thiruvalar Panchangam	Inspector Narendhiran	
2021	Pulikkuthi Pandi	Inspector Ramanathan	
2021	Kalathil Santhippom	Sofia's father	
2021	Udanpirappe	Peruthulasi	
2021	Maaligai	Shanthi's father	Only dubbed version released
2021	Anti Indian	Deputy Commissioner	
2021	Ikk	Kanagavel Rajan	
2021	Thalli Pogathey	Pallavi's father	
2021	Plan Panni Pannanum	Ayyaavvu	
2021	Thanne Vandi		
2022	Mahaan	Mohandoss	Cameo appearance
2022	Koorman		
2022	Maaran	Mathimaaran's uncle	
2022	Ayngaran	Perumalsamy	
2022	My Dear Lisa	Church father	
2022	Rendagam	Chacha	
2022	Buffoon	Rengarajan	
2022	Kaari	Vellasaamy	
2022	Aruvaa Sanda		
2022	Driver Jamuna	Maragathavel	
2022	DSP	Chief Minister	
2023	Vindhya Victim Verdict V3		
2023	Vaathi	Bala's father	
2023	Kannitheevu		
2023	Ghosty	Priest	
2023	Kathar Basha Endra Muthuramalingam	Veriyandi	
2023	Deiva Machan	Zamindar	
2023	Theerkadarishi		
2023	Are You Ok Baby?	Judge	
2023	Indha Crime Thappilla		
2023	80s Buildup		
2023	Mathimaran		
2023	Sarakku		
2024	Ettum Varai Ettu		
2024	Maya Puthagam	Rangaraja Yaadhavrayar	
2024	Pogumidam Vegu Thooramillai	Sankarapandian	
2024	Hitler	Varadhan	
2024	Seeran		
2024	Sevakar		
2024	Jolly O Gymkhana	Adaikalaraj's lawyer	
2024	Mayan		
2024	Miss You	Surgeon	
2024	Rajakili	College correspondent	
2025	Nilavuku En Mel Ennadi Kobam	Devachandran Prabhakaran	
2025	Niram Marum Ulagil	Das	
2025	Eleven		
2025	Phoenix		
2025	Madharaasi	Inspector Manikandan	
2025	Padaiyaanda Maaveeraa	Ravichandran	
2025	Idli Kadai	Vishnuvardhan’s PA	
2025	Vattakhanal		
2025	Mask	Advocate	Cameo appearance
2025	Indian Penal Law	Thirupathisamy	
2026	Lucky The Superstar	CM's rival	
2026	Vadam	Santhanavel	
2026	Kara	Police officer	
2026	Karuppu	Chief Metropolitan Magistrate Soundarapandiyan	
2026	Idhayam Murali	Adhithi's father	
2026	DC	Inspector Rajadurai	
2026	Photographer	Sengutavan	
2026	Lenin Pandiyan		
2026	Meesaya Murukku 2	Masilamani	

=== Telugu films ===
Year	Title	Role	Notes
2008	Salute		
2016	Malupu	Krishnan	
2018	Agnyaathavaasi	MLA	
2018	Touch Chesi Chudu	C. I. M. Murugesan	
2018	U Turn	Chandrasekhar	
2021	Narappa	Panduswamy	
2021	Tuck Jagadish	Somaraju	
2021	Anubhavinchu Raja	Village President	
2022	Like, Share & Subscribe	Narendra Varma	
2023	Sir	Balu's father	
2023	Peddha Kapu 1	Bhaiyanna	
2023	Bhagavanth Kesari	Sarath Sanghvi	
2023	Tiger Nageswara Rao	Tiger's father	
2023	My Name Is Shruthi	MLA Gurumurthy	
2024	Tenant	Raghava Rao	
2024	Mr. Bachchan	Chief Minister	
2024	Kalinga		
2024	Pushpa 2: The Rule	KVM Narasimha Reddy	
2025	Pothugadda	Samudra	
2025	Daaku Maharaaj	Minister Udham Singh	
2025	Thandel	Lingayya	
2025	Dilruba		
2025	Robinhood	Minister	
2025	Eleven		

=== Other language films ===
Year	Title	Role	Language
2013	D Company	Nripan Chakraborthy	Malayalam
2022	Ottu	Chacha	Malayalam
2023	Mute		Kannada
2024	Max	Daniel	Kannada
2026	Pallichattambi	Ayyanar Perumal	Malayalam

=== Dubbing artist ===
Year	Title	Actor	Character
2007	Veerappu	Supreeth	Thilla
2007	Polladhavan	Murali	Dhanush's father
2018	Kalakalappu 2	Madhusudhan Rao	Dharmaraj
2025	Game Changer (Tamil dubbed version)	Srikanth	Bobbili Sathyamurthy

== Television ==
Year	Title	Role	Language	Network
2000	Balu Mahendravin Kathai Neram		Tamil	Sun TV
2000	Krishnadasi		Tamil	Sun TV
2002–2004	Rudra Veenai	Ramachandran	Tamil	Sun TV
2004	Sivamayam		Tamil	Sun TV
2004	My Dear Bootham		Tamil	Sun TV
2005	Aasai		Tamil	Vijay TV
2005	Nimmathi		Tamil	Sun TV
2005	Nilavai Pidippom		Tamil	Raj TV
2006	Kana Kaanum Kaalangal	Chidambaram, correspondent	Tamil	Vijay TV
2008	Kadhalikka Neramillai	Chandru	Tamil	Vijay TV
2013	Deivam		Tamil	Sun TV
2014	Akka		Tamil	Jaya TV
2020	Mugilan	Mudaliyar	Tamil	ZEE5
2021	Pudhu Pudhu Arthangal	Ramanathan: Raghavan's friend	Tamil	Zee Tamil
2021	Enga Veetu Meenakshi	Deivanayagam	Tamil	Colors Tamil
2022	Recce	Varadarajulu	Telugu	ZEE5
2023	The Village	Sakthivel	Tamil	Amazon Prime Video
