= Munnar Ramesh =

Indian actor

- Born: Ramesh
- Occupation: Character actor
- Years active: 2005–present

Munnar Ramesh is an Indian actor who works in Tamil-language films. He is known for his character and villainous roles, as well as his frequent collaborations with Vetrimaaran. He has acted in over 100 films.

== Career ==
Ramesh worked in a travels company before venturing into cinema. He made his debut with Balu Mahendra's Adhu Oru Kana Kaalam (2005). His first break came with Pudhupettai (2006) where he played Dhanush's father. He garnered acclaim for the dialogue "Kadavul Irukaan Kumaru" (God is there, Kumar). The dialogue became so popular that it inspired a film of the same name. He played a pivotal role in 6 (2013) as a driver who helps the lead character find his son. He played a police officer in Vada Chennai (2018). He has also worked as a dubbing artiste for Sayaji Shinde.

== Filmography ==
=== Films ===
- Adhu Oru Kana Kaalam (2005)
- Theenda Theenda (2006)
- Thalai Nagaram (2006)
- Pudhupettai (2006)
- Lee (2007)
- Sivaji: The Boss (2007)
- Kireedam (2007)
- Polladhavan (2007)
- Bheemaa (2008)
- Pathu Pathu (2008)
- Jayamkondaan (2008)
- Poi Solla Porom (2008)
- Padikkadavan (2009)
- Vettaikaran (2009)
- Thittakudi (2010)
- Unakkaga En Kadhal (2010)
- Aadukalam (2011)
- Mappillai (2011)
- Velayudham (2011)
- Asthamanam (2012)
- Kumki (2012)
- 6 (2013)
- His Wife (2014)
- Nimirndhu Nil (2014)
- Poriyaalan (2014)
- India Pakistan (2015)
- Buddhanin Sirippu (2015)
- Vaalu (2015)
- 49-O (2015)
- Visaranai (2016)
- Enakku Veru Engum Kilaigal Kidayathu (2016)
- Ulkuthu (2017)
- Vada Chennai (2018)
- Kattu Paya Sir Intha Kaali (2018)
- Azhagumagan (2018)
- Annanukku Jai (2018)
- Irandam Ulagaporin Kadaisi Gundu (2019)
- Asuran (2019)
- Naan Sirithal (2020)
- Nungambakkam (2020)
- Naanga Romba Busy (2020)
- Mei Maranthen (2020)
- Carbon (2022)
- Payanigal Gavanikkavum (2022)
- Yenni Thuniga (2022)
- Viduthalai Part 1 (2023)
- Theerkadarishi (2023)
- Lal Salaam (2024)
- Viduthalai Part 2 (2024)
- Phoenix (2025)
- Right (2025)
- Mask (2025)
- Sirai (2025)
- Karuppu (2026)
- Sannidhanam P.O (2026)
- Con City (2026)

=== Web series ===
Year	Title	Role	Platform
2025-present	Nadu Center	KB school's PE teacher	JioHotstar
2026	Thadayam	DSP Gunasekaran	ZEE5
