= Vetrimaaran =

Indian filmmaker

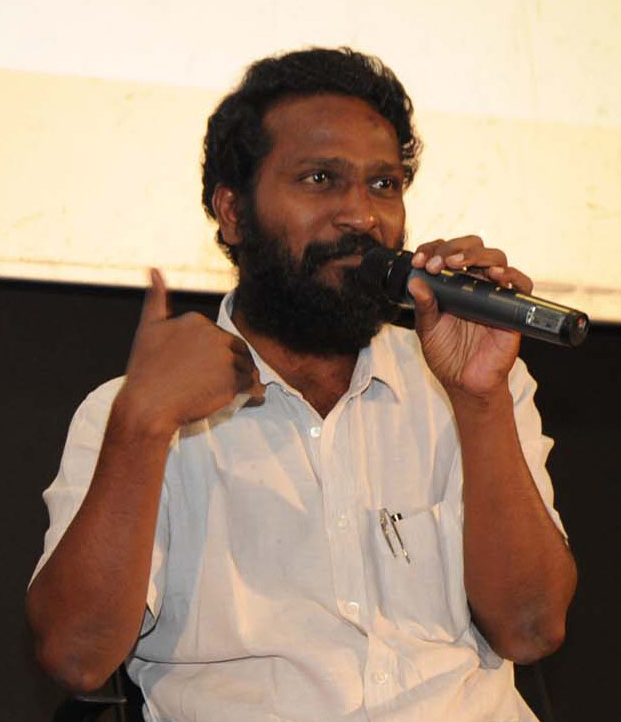
- Vetrimaaran in August 2016
- Born: 4 September 1975 (age 51); Cuddalore, Tamil Nadu, India
- Other name: Vathiyar
- Occupations: Film director, Film producer, Screenwriter
- Years active: 2007 – present
- Spouse: Aarthi
- Children: 2
- Relatives: Ere. Elamvazhuthi (maternal grandfather)

Vetrimaaran is an Indian film director, film producer and screenwriter who primarily works in Tamil cinema. He is known for his unique filmography with major commercial success and highly critically acclaimed body of work. He has won five National Film Awards, three Filmfare South Awards and one Tamil Nadu State Film Award.

Vetrimaaran made his directorial debut with Polladhavan (2007). His second feature film Aadukalam (2011) won six National Film Awards. His 2016 directorial Visaranai was selected as India's official entry to the Academy Awards. His film Asuran (2019) received the National Film Award for Best Feature Film in Tamil. He produces films under his production company, Grass Root Film Company. He is also the founder of International Institute of Film and Culture (IIFC).

== Personal life ==
Vetrimaaran was born in Cuddalore in 1975 . His father V. Chitravel was a veterinary scientist, and his mother Megala Chitravel is a novelist. He has an elder sister. He later moved to Ranipet.

He is married to Aarthi whom he met at Loyola College where he studied. They have two children, Poonthendrel and Kathiravan. Aarthi dubbed for Shantipriya in Bad Girl.

== Career ==
=== Late 1990s–2007: Beginning directions ===
While studying English literature at Loyola College, he undertook a course on television presentation, at the end of which he had to make a film. While making the film, he learned of his inclination towards filmmaking. Later, he attended a seminar organised by Balu Mahendra, who at that time was a visiting professor at Loyola. Impressed by the veteran filmmaker, Vetrimaaran decided that he would learn filmmaking from him. Mahendra then accepted Vetrimaaran as one of his lead assistants. Following this, he faced the dilemma of choosing between studies and film. He opted for the latter, which meant he had to opt out of his course at Loyola. Mahendra expanded his duties for the Tamil serial Kathai Neram (2000) and the Tamil films En Iniya Ponnilave (2001), Julie Ganapathy (2003), and Adhu Oru Kana Kaalam (2005). Vetrimaaran has since credited Mahendra as his mentor and the one who encouraged him to follow his dream of becoming a director. Vetrimaaran also acted in a brief role as Richard Rishi's assistant in Kadhir's Kadhal Virus (2002).

It was during the making of Adhu Oru Kana Kaalam where Vetrimaaran became acquainted with the lead actor of the film, Dhanush. He prepared a script for Dhanush, who immediately accepted the offer after hearing the story. After he found trouble finding producers with A. M. Rathnam and Salem Chandrasekhar leaving the project after initial interest, Dhanush's sister Vimala Geetha agreed to produce the film, but she also dropped the film. Dhanush's father Kasthuri Raja finally agreed to produce the film. However, after two days of shoot, the film was shelved, and Dhanush opted to pursue other films after the surprise success of his Thiruvilaiyaadal Aarambam (2006). The film's collapse saw Vetrimaaran approach producer S. Kathiresan and narrated to him the stories he had prepared. Kathiresan did not like Desiya Nedunchaalai 47 but agreed to work on another project titled Polladhavan (2007).

Vetrimaaran has since described that he had "ample time" for the production works of Polladhavan as "Dhanush had confidence in him". The film's story was inspired partly by the lost bike of his friend Andrew and the variety of experiences he had tracking down his vehicle. Vetrimaaran revealed that when he wrote the script, he made many changes to suit the visual medium and for Dhanush on his physical attributes while playing an action hero. The film opened in November 2007 to rave reviews, with the critic from Sify stating that "Vetri has made his mentor proud, and his style of narration and takings are very similar to the ace director Balu Mahendra, labelling that the film had shades of Vittorio De Sica's 1948 Italian film, Bicycle Thieves. When questioned about its relevance to Bicycle Thieves, he stated that it "is a disgrace to Bicycle Thieves if it is compared with Polladhavan".

=== 2011–2015: Breakthrough and widespread acclaim ===
Following the success of Polladhavan, the entire team of that film (Vetrimaaran, actors Dhanush and Kishore, producer Kathiresan, and composer G. V. Prakash Kumar) collaborated once again for Aadukalam (2011), which deals with the rivalry between cockfighters in Madurai. During the pre-production and scripting, Vetrimaaran spent two years in Madurai to understand the local dialect and lifestyle of the people living there. Aadukalam was the first film of Vetrimaaran to have a production office set up outside of Chennai. Vetrimaaran took a year to complete the screenplay, script, and dialogues for Aadukalam and held a bounded script for the venture, which is considered rare in Tamil films. Vetrimaaran narrated only half of the film's script to Dhanush before the latter was impressed with it and agreed to act in the film. The film was initially titled Seval, but since the rights to the title were already taken by director Hari for his project with Bharath, Vetrimaaran decided to rename his film as Aadukalam.

The film languished in production hell for two years due to constant changing in cast, crew and location, but Vetrimaaran, Dhanush, Kishore, Kathiresan and Prakash Kumar remained on. Vetrimaaran introduced two newcomers who made their Tamil debuts: actress Taapsee Pannu and Sri Lankan Tamil writer and political commentator V. I. S. Jayapalan, while future Vetrimaaran collaborators Dinesh, Murugadoss, and Naren made their breakthroughs through this film.

Upon release, Aadukalam received critical acclaim and was a commercial success. Sify called it "a gutsy and brilliant film" and mentioned that it " lives up to the expectation that the film carried and the credit goes to Vetrimaran whose research and hard work shows on screen".

In 2012, Vetrimaaran launched his own production house called the Grass Root Film Company and launched his maiden project, Udhayam NH4 (2013) with Siddharth in the lead role and his associate Manimaran as director. He wrote the dialogues of Naan Rajavaga Pogiren (2013), directed by newcomer Prithvi Rajkumar. In 2014, his production Poriyaalan, dubbed as a sort of sibling to Polladhavan, was released to critical appreciation. In 2015, the Children's film Kaaka Muttai (2015), directed by Manikandan and jointly produced by Dhanush's Wunderbar Films and Grassroot Film Company received critical acclaim from all around India and won the Best Children's Film Award at the 62nd National Film Awards.

=== 2016–present: Further success ===
Vetrimaaran's third venture was the crime-thriller Visaranai (2016) was based on M. Chandrakumar's novel Lock Up. The film deals with the lives of a few Tamil laborers subject to horrific atrocities committed by the police from which they are unable to escape. Vetrimaaran chose to begin the film before the schedule for his other venture Vada Chennai (2018) and reunited with actors Dinesh, Murugadoss, and Kishore, where the first two play the main Tamil laborers, while the latter plays an auditor. Though he had dubbed for Kishore in Aadukalam, Samuthirakani made this film his maiden acting collaboration with Vetrimaaran, portraying as a hard-nosed yet sympathetic police inspector, while Telugu film actor Ajay Ghosh made his breakthrough as a Telugu soft-spoken yet "villainous" inspector in Guntur. Upon release, Visaranai received positive reviews. Twitch Film viewed Visarnai as a top class film about reality comparable to 2012 Cannes favorite Gangs of Wasseypur. Baradwaj Rangan, then of The Hindu wrote "Visaranai is beautifully filmed, though there isn't much room for beauty. The frames appear to have been snatched from the back alleys of life. The verité illusion is aided by the utterly lifelike performances—even if the word "performance" seems wrong."

Visaranai was India's official entry in the Foreign Language film category at the 2017 Academy Awards, but failed to get nominated. In India, the film also won three National Film awards - Best Feature Film in Tamil, Best Supporting Actor for Samuthirakani, and Best Editing for Kishore Te and G. B. Venkatesh and numerous awards at Ananda Vikatan and Filmfare South.

Vetrimaaran also produced three films in a row: Kodi (2016), Lens (2017) and Annanukku Jai (2018). His fourth directorial venture which he had been preparing for since 2009, Vada Chennai saw him reunite with Dhanush, Samuthirakani, Kishore, Daniel Balaji, Pawan, cinematographer Velraj, art director Jacki, and editor G. B. Venkatesh. The film is about a skilled carrom player who becomes a reluctant participant in a gang war between two rival gangsters. Like Aadukalam, the film went through production and development hell over a period of nine years with huge changes in cast and crew and much scouting and research, yet Vetrimaaran made sure it was not shelved. The film ran into controversy from the fisherfolk community, because of a love-making scene between Ameer and Andrea Jeremiah filmed in a boat, which was considered to be offensive for the community. As a result, Vetrimaaran in a video statement, apologized to anyone who may have been hurt by the offensive scenes and agreed to remove them from the film.

After a long delay, Vada Chennai was released on 18 October 2018, opening to critical and commercial acclaim, with critics praising the story, screenplay and each of the actors' performance. Janani K, a critic from India Today gave a rating of 4/5 stars and said that "Vada Chennai has everything you look for in a gangster thriller. But Vetri Maaran's display of twists and turns will win you over." Sowmya Rajendran, editor-in-chief of The News Minute wrote "From the colourful curses of the street to each of the characters, the film gives us a very real glimpse of gang wars. Vetrimaaran-Dhanush delivers a brilliant gangster film." Baradwaj Rangan of Film Companion South wrote "Dhanush's ascent to stardom has come alongside his growth as an actor, and there’s not one scene where he makes us doubt his character's actions. With his outstanding cinematographer Velraj, Vetrimaaran unleashes one flamboyant scene after another." Vada Chennai earned ₹50 crore (US$5.2 million) at the worldwide box office, and Dhanush received numerous accolades for his role.

Producer Kalaipuli S. Thanu signed Vetrimaaran and Dhanush to a new film, Asuran which saw the duo reunite with music director G. V. Prakash Kumar, cinematographer Velraj and actors Naren, Pawan and Munnar Ramesh (who has featured in all of Vetrimaaran's feature films from Polladhavan onwards). The film's plot is based on Poomani's novel Vekkai (transl. Heat) and is influenced by the real-life Kilvenmani massacre that occurred in 1968. Dhanush plays a lower class farmer who has to protect his family when his youngest son murders a rich upper class landlord and is seen in two looks: one as a young man in a flashback and the second as a middle-aged man in the present.

Upon release in October 2019, it received critical acclaim. The Times of India, rated 3.5 out of 5 stars, stating that "Vetri Maaran delivers yet another solid action drama that keeps us engrossed from start to finish." S. Subhakeerthana from The Indian Express rated the film 4 out of 5 and reviewed it as "With this Dhanush starrer, Vetrimaaran proves he's one of the finest directors in Indian cinema, yet again. Only a few filmmakers like him can pull off a mainstream cinema, balancing ‘realism’ and commercial elements." Commercially, the film became a blockbuster at the box office, entering the ₹100 crore club and is currently the highest-grossing film of Vetrimaaran's career. It won numerous awards including two National Awards – Best Feature Film in Tamil and Best Actor for Dhanush. In the same year, Vetrimaaran collaborated with Suresh Kamatchi for their production, Miga Miga Avasaram (2019).

Vetrimaaran wrote and directed a segment, Oor Iravu, for the anthology, Paava Kadhaigal (2020), starring Sai Pallavi and Prakash Raj. Each of the short films of the anthology touch upon the issue of honour killing. "Oor Iravu" received positive acclaim with Baradwaj Rangan of Film Companion writing, "Vetri Maaran’s is the most powerful, most gut-churning installment. The house becomes a character of its own, with its clearly established geography...It may seem strange to say this, given Vetri Maaran’s terrific run of films, but Oor Iravu is his best-directed work."

In 2023, Vetrimaaran directed Viduthalai Part 1, based on the Vachathi case. The film featured once comedian now a mass hero Soori as a police constable, with him playing the lead role for the first time in his career, while Vijay Sethupathi plays the leader of a separatist group. The film received positive reviews and became a success at the box office.

== Filmography ==
=== As director ===
Year	Film	Notes
2007	Polladhavan	Vijay Award for Best Director
2011	Aadukalam	National Film Award for Best Director; National Film Award for Best Screenplay; Filmfare Award for Best Tamil Director; SIIMA Award for Best Director – Tamil; Vijay Award for Best Director
2016	Visaranai	Also co-producer National Film Award for Best Feature Film in Tamil; Ananda Vikatan Cinema Award for Best Film; Ananda Vikatan Cinema Award for Best Director; Ananda Vikatan Cinema Award for Best Director
2018	Vada Chennai	Also producer Ananda Vikatan Cinema Award for Best Screenplay
2019	Asuran	National Film Award for Best Feature Film in Tamil; Zee Cine Award Tamil for Best Director; Behindwoods Gold Medal for Best Director; Ananda Vikatan Cinema Award for Best Director; Norway Tamil Film Festival Award for Best Director; SIIMA Award for Best Director – Tamil
2020	Paava Kadhaigal	Anthology Film; segment: Oor Iravu
2023	Viduthalai Part 1	Filmfare Critics Award for Best Film – Tamil;
2024	Viduthalai Part 2	Ananda Vikatan Cinema Award for Best Dialogue
2027	Arasan	Filming
TBA	Thamizh Murugan	Pre-Production

=== As producer and writer ===
This is a list of films that Vetrimaaran worked for other directors.

Year	Title	Credited as		Notes
Year	Title	Producer	Writer	Notes
2013	Udhayam NH4	Creative	Yes	
2014	Poriyaalan	Yes	No	
2015	Kaaka Muttai	Yes	No	National Film Award for Best Children's Film; Ananda Vikatan Cinema Award for Best Film; Norway Tamil Film Festival Award for Best Film; Audience's Choice Award for Best Feature Film; Tamil Nadu State Film Award Special Prize; Filmfare Award for Best Film – Tamil; Edison Award for Best Producer
2016	Kodi	Yes	No	
2017	Lens	Yes	No	
2018	Annanukku Jai	Yes	No	
2019	Miga Miga Avasaram	Yes	No	
2021	Sangathalaivan	Yes	No	
2022	Anel Meley Pani Thuli	Yes	No	Released on Sony LIV
2024	Garudan	Uncredited	No	Credited as Special Thanks
2024	Sir	Presenter	No	
2025	Bad Girl	Yes	No	Anurag Kashyap as co-presenter
2025	Elumale	Presenter	No	Tamil dubbed version
2025	Mask	Presenter	No	
2026	Mandaadi	Creative	No	Elred Kumar as producer

==== As an actor ====
Year	Title	Role	Notes
2002	Kadhal Virus	Deepak's assistant	Uncredited role
2014	Jigarthanda	Himself	Uncredited role
2024	Star	Himself	

=== Television ===
Year	Title	Creator	Director	Writer	Producer	Notes
2022	Pettaikaali	Yes	No	No	No	
TBA	Nilamellaam Rattham	Yes	No	Yes	Executive	With Ameer and Yuvan

== Other work ==
=== Music videos ===
Year	Album	Singer	Composer	Lyricist	Notes	Ref.
2012	"Tata Nano"	Dhanush & Blaaze	Anirudh Ravichander	Dhanush	Director	

=== Frequent collaborators ===
Collaborator	Polladhavan; (2007)	Aadukalam; (2011)	Visaranai; (2016)	Vada Chennai; (2018)	Asuran; (2019)	Viduthalai Part 1; (2023)	Viduthalai Part 2; (2024)
Dhanush	Yes	Yes	Yes (as co-producers)	Yes	Yes	Yes (as playback singer)	
Kishore	Yes	Yes	Yes	Yes			Yes
Pawan	Yes			Yes	Yes		
Sendrayan	Yes	Yes		Yes (cameo)	Yes		
Munnar Ramesh	Yes	Yes	Yes	Yes	Yes	Yes	Yes
Samuthirakani		Yes (voice artist)	Yes	Yes			
Chetan	Yes					Yes	Yes
Saravana Subbiah			Yes			Yes	Yes
Pavel Navageethan				Yes		Yes	Yes
Balaji Sakthivel					Yes	Yes	Yes
Daniel Balaji	Yes			Yes			
Tamizh					Yes	Yes	Yes
Bala Hasan					Yes	Yes	Yes
G. V. Prakash Kumar	Yes	Yes	Yes		Yes		
Velraj	Yes	Yes		Yes	Yes	Yes	Yes
R. Ramar				Yes	Yes	Yes	Yes
Soori						Yes	Yes
Vijay Sethupathi						Yes	Yes
Manju Warrier					Yes		Yes
Ken Karunas					Yes		Yes
