= Filmfare Award for Best Supporting Actor – Tamil =

Indian annual film award

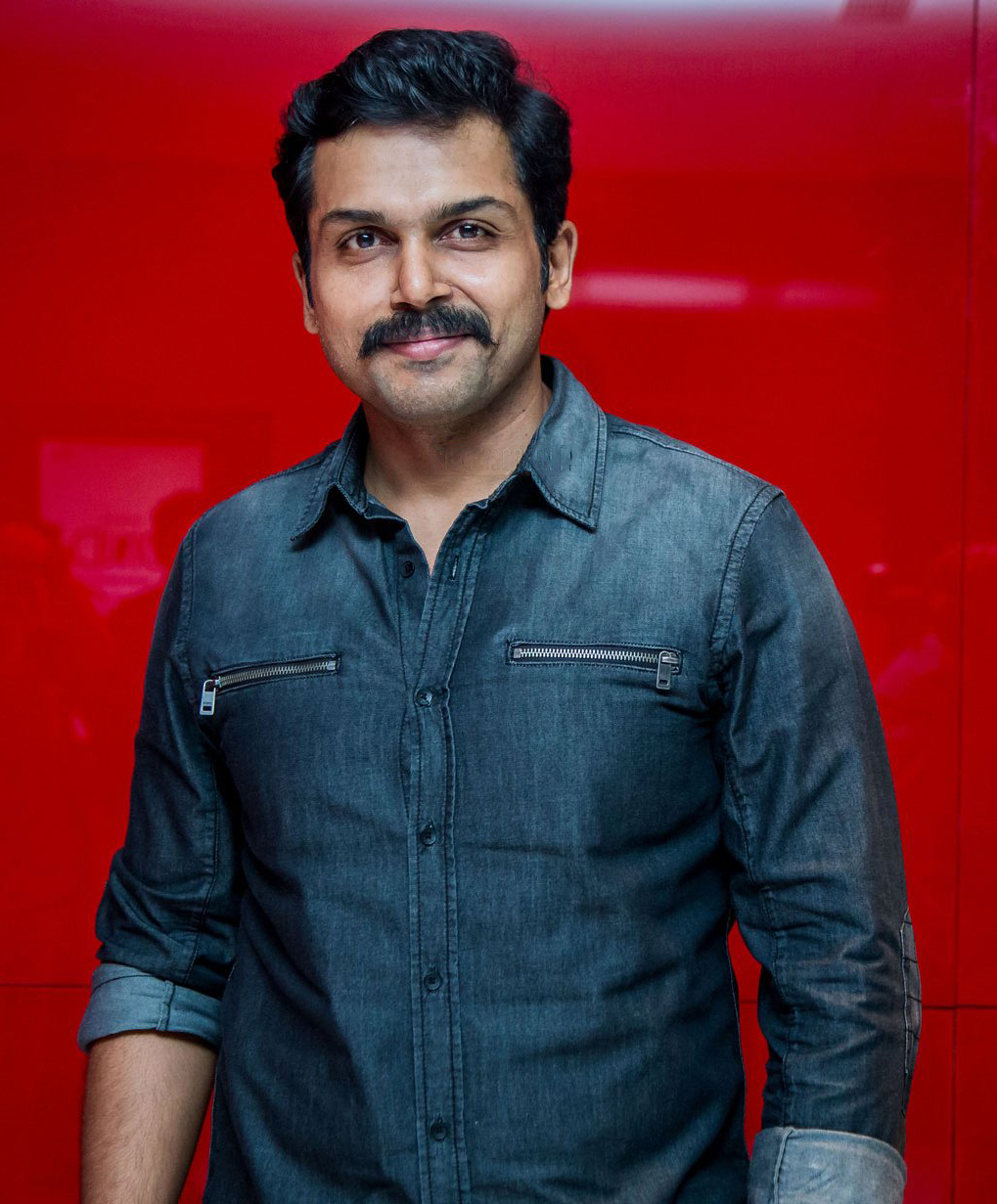
- The 2024 recipient: Karthi
- Awarded for: Best Performance by an Actor in a Supporting Role – Tamil
- Country: India
- Presented by: Filmfare
- First award: Jayaram for Panchathanthiram (2003)
- Currently held by: Karthi for Meiyazhagan (2024)
- Website: Filmfare Awards

The Filmfare Award for Best Supporting Actor – Tamil is given by the Filmfare magazine as part of its annual Filmfare Awards South for Tamil (Kollywood) films.

The award was introduced and first given at the 51st South Filmfare Awards in 2003, with Jayaram being the first recipient.

== Superlatives ==
Superlative	Actor	Record
Actor with most wins	Ajmal Ameer	2
Actor with most wins	Pasupathy	2
Actor with most wins	Sathyaraj	2
Actor with most nominations	Prakash Raj	9
Actor with most nominations without ever winning	Prakash Raj	9
Actors with most nominations in a single year	Santhanam	2
Oldest winner	Sathyaraj	64
Oldest nominee	Mahendran	76
Youngest winner	Ajmal Ameer	24
Youngest nominee	Ajmal Ameer	24

== Multiple nominations ==
- 9 nominations: Prakash Raj
- 5 nominations: Prabhu, Samuthirakani
- 4 nominations: Santhanam, Pasupathy
- 3 nominations: R. Madhavan, Thambi Ramaiah, Sathyaraj, S. J. Suryah
- 2 nominations: Rajkiran, Arya, Kaali Venkat, Prasanna, Ajmal Ameer, Vadivelu, Rajendran, Prithviraj Sukumaran, Yogi Babu, Anurag Kashyap
- 1 nomination: Vinay Rai, R. Sarathkumar

== Winners ==
Year	Actor	Film
2024	Karthi	Meiyazhagan
2024	Anurag Kashyap	Maharaja
2024	Bobby Deol	Kanguva
2024	Kaali Venkat	Lubber Pandhu
2024	Shantanu Bhagyaraj	Blue Star
2023	Fahadh Faasil	Maamannan
2023	M. S. Bhaskar	Parking
2023	S. J. Suryah	Mark Antony
2023	Vinayakan	Jailer
2023	Yogi Babu	Maaveeran
2022	Kaali Venkat	Gargi
2022	Arav	Kalaga Thalaivan
2022	S. J. Suryah	Don
2022	Selvaraghavan	Saani Kaayidham
2022	Vijay Sethupathi	Vikram
2022	Yogi Babu	Love Today
2020 - 2021	Pasupathy	Sarpatta Parambarai
2020 - 2021	Gautham Vasudev Menon	Kannum Kannum Kollaiyadithaal
2020 - 2021	Paresh Rawal	Soorarai Pottru
2020 - 2021	Prakash Raj	Jai Bhim
2020 - 2021	R. Sarathkumar	Vaanam Kottatum
2020 - 2021	S. J. Suryah	Maanaadu
2020 - 2021	Samuthirakani	Udanpirappe
2019	AWARDS FUNCTION WAS SUSPENDED DUE TO COVID-19 PANDEMIC	
2018	Sathyaraj	Kanaa
2018	Akshay Kumar	2.0
2018	Anurag Kashyap	Imaikkaa Nodigal
2018	Arun Vijay	Chekka Chivantha Vaanam
2018	Samuthirakani	Kaala
2017	Prasanna	Thiruttu Payale 2
2017	Abhimanyu Singh	Theeran Adhigaram Ondru
2017	S. J. Suryah	Mersal
2017	Vinay Rai	Thupparivaalan
2017	Vivek Oberoi	Vivegam
2016	Samuthirakani	Visaranai
2016	Mahendran	Theri
2016	Rajendran	Theri
2016	Sathish	Remo
2016	Sathish Krishnan	Achcham Yenbadhu Madamaiyada
2015	Arvind Swami	Thani Oruvan
2015	Arun Vijay	Yennai Arindhaal
2015	K. S. Ravikumar	Thanga Magan
2015	Prakash Raj	OK Kanmani
2015	R. Parthiepan	Naanum Rowdy Dhaan
2014	Bobby Simha	Jigarthanda
2014	Kalaiyarasan	Madras
2014	Siddharth	Kaaviya Thalaivan
2014	Samuthirakani	Velaiyilla Pattathari
2014	Thambi Ramaiah	Kathai Thiraikathai Vasanam Iyakkam
2013	Sathyaraj	Raja Rani
2013	Arya	Arrambam
2013	Jai	Raja Rani
2013	Jerry	Paradesi
2013	Rahman	Singam 2
2012	Thambi Ramaiah	Kumki
2012	Narain	Mugamoodi
2012	Pasupathi	Aravaan
2012	Santhanam	Oru Kal Oru Kannadi
2012	Sathyaraj	Nanban
2012	Vidyut Jamwal	Thuppakki
2011	Ajmal Ameer	Ko
2011	Santhanam	Deiva Thirumagal
2011	Santhanam	Siruthai
2011	Sunder Ramu	Mayakkam Enna
2011	V. I. S. Jayapalan	Aadukalam
2010	R. Parthiban	Aayirathil Oruvan
2010	Madhavan	Manmadan Ambu
2010	Prakash Raj	Singam
2010	Prithviraj	Raavanan
2010	Santhanam	Boss Engira Bhaskaran
2010	Thambi Ramaiah	Mynaa
2009	Jayaprakash	Pasanga
2009	Jagan	Ayan
2009	Prabhu	Ayan
2009	Rajendran	Naan Kadavul
2009	Vadivelu	Aadhavan
2008	Ajmal Ameer	Anjathey
2008	Prakash Raj	Abhiyum Naanum
2008	Prasanna	Anjathe
2008	Sampath Raj	Saroja
2008	Samuthirakani	Subramaniyapuram
2007	Saravanan	Paruthiveeran
2007	Kishore	Polladhavan
2007	Prabhu	Billa
2007	Prakash Raj	Mozhi
2007	Suman	Sivaji
2006	Pasupathy	E
2006	Guinness Pakru	Dishyum
2006	Nassar	Em Magan
2006	Prakash Raj	Vettaiyaadu Vilaiyaadu
2006	Vadivelu	Em Magan
2005	Rajkiran	Thavamai Thavamirundhu
2005	Arya	Ullam Ketkumae
2005	Napoleon	Ayya
2005	Pasupathy	Majaa
2005	Prabhu	Chandramukhi
2004	R. Madhavan	Aayutha Ezhuthu
2004	Prabhu	Vasool Raja MBBS
2004	Prakash Raj	M. Kumaran S/O Mahalakshmi
2004	Rajkiran	Kovil
2004	Siddharth	Aayutha Ezhuthu
2003	Suriya	Pithamagan
2003	Madhavan	Anbe Sivam
2003	Prakash Raj	Chokka Thangam
2002	Jayaram	Panchathanthiram
2002	J. D. Chakravarthy	Kannathil Muthamittal
2002	Prabhu	Charlie Chaplin
2002	Prakash Raj	Kannathil Muthamittal
2002	Yugi Sethu	Ramana
