= Aadukalam =

2011 film by Vetrimaaran

- Theatrical release poster
- Directed by: Vetrimaaran
- Screenplay by: Vetrimaaran; Additional screenplay: Vikram Sugumaran
- Story by: Vetrimaaran
- Dialogues by: Vetrimaaran; Vikram Sugumaran
- Produced by: S. Kathiresan
- Starring: Dhanush; Taapsee; Kishore; V. I. S. Jayapalan; Naren; Murugadoss
- Cinematography: Velraj
- Edited by: Kishore Te.
- Music by: G. V. Prakash Kumar
- Production companies: Group Companys; Five Star Films
- Distributed by: Sun Pictures
- Release date: 14 January 2011
- Running time: 154 minutes
- Country: India
- Language: Tamil
- Budget: ₹10 crore
- Box office: ₹30 crore (Note: The average exchange rate in 2011 was 51.10 Indian rupees (₹) per 1 US dollar (US$).)

Aadukalam (transl. Playground) is a 2011 Indian Tamil-language sports action drama film directed by Vetrimaaran, produced by S. Kathiresan and distributed by Sun Pictures. The film stars Dhanush in the lead role, alongside Taapsee (in her Tamil debut), Kishore, V. I. S. Jayapalan, Naren Narayanan, and Murugadoss. G. V. Prakash Kumar composed the film score and soundtrack.

The film was released on 14 January 2011 to critical acclaim, with critics praising the screenplay, direction and performances (particularly of Dhanush, Jayapalan and Naren). The film won six awards at the 58th National Film Awards, including Best Director, Best Screenplay and Best Actor. The film also won five awards at the 59th Filmfare Awards South – Best Film, Best Director, Best Actor, Best Music Director and Best Cinematography. Based on an online poll by The Times of India, Vetrimaran was chosen as the best director for Aadukalam.

== Plot ==
In Madurai, rooster trainer Periyasamy (known as "Pettaikaaran") and Madurai Central Police Inspector Rathnaswamy are rivals in cockfights. Pettai usually wins as his methods of raising the birds are not known to others. Rathnasamy and Pettai were once trained by Doraisamy. He has retired from competition but remains an influential figure in rooster fighting in southern Tamil Nadu.

K. P. Karuppu and Durai are the favourites in Pettai's team. Karuppu is very talented in breeding and training roosters, while Durai is very rich, owns three bars in the town of Thiruparankundram, and is talented in rooster training. One day, during an informal match, local police raid the spot and arrest most of the involved, except Rathnaswamy and Durai who escape. Everyone is released after stern warning from the local police, after intervention from Rathnasamy. Pettai's roosters were abducted by the fleeing men from Rathnasamy's party, and Pettai orders his guys to bring them back by any means. He also asks them to kill any fowl which had bred with his roosters, to prevent the strength of his roosters passing to Rathnasamy's flock. Karuppu goes to the railway colony at night, to retrieve their rooster, since an ally of Rathnasamy lives there. He kills the fowl which had mated with their rooster, and bumps into an Anglo-Indian girl named Irene. He is smitten with her beauty, but silences her and leaves.

Having been defeated in all earlier bouts with Pettai's roosters, Rathinasamy keeps insisting on having one last fight to win and satisfy his old mother's wish, but Pettai declines to have any more cockfights because he feels that Rathnaswamy has lost faith in his roosters and will be using nefarious methods to win, like the earlier raid.

Karuppu falls in love with Irene, who dislikes him. He does not recognise this initially and keeps following her. One day, the residents of Irene's colony confront him and ask Irene to tell who she is in love with – Karuppu or Dinesh, another man in the locality. She points her finger at Karuppu, and he goes into rapture. She explains later that she had to lie in order to avoid Dinesh, who has been bothering her for a long time. Later, Irene too falls in love with Karuppu.

Meanwhile, Rathnasamy tries to cajole Ayub, Pettai's veterinarian, to convince Pettai for a competition against himself, in exchange for a huge amount. Ayub refuses and insults Rathnasamy. The same night, Ayub is killed in a hit and run accident. Durai initially suspects Rathnaswamy and all of Pettai's gang wants revenge, but Pettai decides to conduct a state tournament in Ayub's name and provide his family with funds so that Ayub's destitute daughters can be married. He asks permission from Rathnasamy as the police have to permit it, but Rathnaswamy refuses, manhandles him, and berates Pettai as a thief. In a rage, Pettai, suspecting Rathnaswamy of Ayub's murder, agrees to the one-on-one rooster fight that Rathnaswamy has been asking for so long. He bets that he will field his roosters against every rooster that Rathnaswamy brings to the field in the upcoming tournament, and even if one of Pettai's roosters loses against Rathnaswamy's, Pettai will tonsure his head and shave his face, publicly apologise to him, and will quit rooster fights. If Rathnaswamy is not able to beat at least one of his roosters, the same conditions will be applied on him. Finally getting his way, Rathnaswamy permits the tournament.

The grand state tournament is arranged by Pettai's team, getting heavy funds and official permission. In the initial 11 fights, Rathnasamy's roosters are defeated by Pettai's. Rathnasamy brings high-bred roosters from Bangalore and enters them into the tournament. Seeing the quality of the new roosters, Karuppu asks Pettai to let his rooster fight, but Pettai puts his rooster down and says that he will choose the best-competing rooster himself. Karuppu surreptitiously enters the contest as Pettai's team before Pettai can choose the rooster because he needs to repay Irene for the loan he took to prepare his rooster for the fight. Pettai does not believe in Karuppu and his rooster - announcing that Karuppu will not represent Pettai, and the result of Karuppu's match will not be acknowledged by his team. However, the 'underdog' emerges victorious in three consecutive rounds, despite facing roosters spiked with steroids. Karuppu gets the best coach award of the tournament and wins the bet of ₹3 lakh (equivalent to ₹6.7 lakh or US$7,000 in 2026).

While initially happy that Karuppu won, Pettai is soon overcome with anger and jealousy. His ego is hurt by the fact that Karuppu earned both popularity and money, by refuting his judgement. Karuppu is not aware of the changes in Pettai's mind. Karuppu gives Pettai the money from the competition for safekeeping, which he plans to use to start a business, but it goes missing. Pettai also starts spinning stories about his associates and makes everyone suspicious of each other. He incites Karuppu and Durai into pitting their roosters in a fight. Meanwhile, Karuppu's mother dies from the shock of losing all the money. Pettai poisons Durai's roosters, making him suspect Karuppu, who is arrested for this. Pettai then lies to Irene that his wife was in an adulterous relationship with Karuppu. Irene's family also pressures her to move to Chennai, which pushes her into attempting suicide. Pettai, meanwhile, calls Karuppu to a location near a temple and informs Durai about his whereabouts. When Irene recovers, she calls Karuppu and informs him that Pettai is badmouthing him, so Karuppu goes to find Pettai and confront him. Karuppu finds that Pettai was the one who stole his money, and a guilt-ridden Pettai kills himself. Karuppu does not wish to reveal Pettai's scheming against him, so he flees with Irene to start a new life in another city, leaving the money with his friend.

== Cast ==
- Dhanush as K. P. Karuppu
- Taapsee as Irene (Dubbed by Andrea Jeremiah)
- Kishore as Durai (Voice Dubbed By Samuthirakani)
- V. I. S. Jayapalan as Periyasamy "Pettaikaran" (Voice dubbed by Radha Ravi)
- Naren as Rathnasamy
- Murugadoss as Oole
- Meenal as Meena
- Sendrayan as Nicholas
- Periya Karuppu Thevar as Ayub
- Jayaprakash as Irene's relative
- Dinesh Ravi as Dinesh
- Halwa Vasu as Speaker
- Munnar Ramesh as Rathnasamy's right hand man
- Ida D'Costa as Irene's grandmother
- Marcus Cleur as Irene's father
- Aadukalam Stella Raj as Karuppu's mother

== Production ==
=== Development ===
A lot of research has gone into the script. I was born and brought up in Chennai and to learn new things, I had to unlearn many. I went to Madurai with a script in mind, but I had to change the script to accommodate reality. To make my film authentic, we have cast people who belong to the sub-cult. I even share credits for scriptwriting with Vikram Sukumaran [sic], who hails from Madurai.

— Vetrimaaran in an interview with V. Lakshmi of The Times of India.

Following the success of their 2007 collaboration Polladhavan, the entire team of that film — director Vetrimaaran, lead actor Dhanush, producer S. Kathiresan, and music director G. V. Prakash Kumar — collaborated again for Aadukalam. Vetrimaaran spent a period of two years in Madurai to understand the local dialect and lifestyle of the people living there. Aadukalam was the first film of Vetrimaaran to have a production office set up outside of Chennai. Vetrimaaran took a year to complete the screenplay, script, and dialogues for Aadukalam and held a bounded script for the venture, which is considered rare in Tamil films. Vetrimaaran narrated only half of the film's script to Dhanush before the latter was impressed with it and agreed to act in the film. The film was initially titled Seval, but since the rights to the title were already taken by director Hari for his project with Bharath, Vetrimaaran decided to rename his film as Aadukalam. Vetrimaaran revealed that the idea of the story was inspired from several films both international and local such as Caché, Amores perros, Babel, Powder Keg, Thevar Magan, Virumaandi, and Paruthiveeran as well as novels such as Roots: The Saga of an American Family and Shantaram, which are mentioned during the end credits.

=== Casting ===
Shriya Saran was signed on for the project in February 2008 but eventually pulled out citing schedule conflicts. In June 2009, Trisha Krishnan, who was selected to replace Saran for the role of Irene, was forced to opt out of the project after her schedule clashed with the allotted dates for her other films, Namo Venkatesa (2010) and Vinnaithaandi Varuvaayaa (2010). Newcomer Taapsee Pannu, a Punjabi software engineer, was named as her replacement. R. Parthiban was originally offered to portray Karuppu's mentor Pettaikaran, but declined due to scheduling conflicts. Sri Lankan Tamil writer and political commentator V. I. S. Jayapalan portrayed the role, thereby making his debut in Tamil cinema. Attakathi Dinesh makes a small cameo in the film as Dinesh, Karuppu's nemesis when it comes to winning Irene's love. Murugadoss plays Karuppu's friend Oole while Naren appears as Rathnasamy who is Pettaikaran's rival in cockfighting; both actors added the film's title to their stage names.

=== Filming ===
Principal photography began in Madurai in February 2009 with scenes featuring Dhanush being shot. The first look of the film was released shortly after the commencement of filming. It featured a series of promotional posters depicting the characters played by Dhanush, Jayapalan and Kishore. During early stages of production, Dhanush revealed he would play the role of a local cockfighter named K. P. Karuppu, and described the venture as his "dream project". The cockfight sequences that take place before intermission was filmed for 26 days in a set created by art director Jacki. Filming was completed in August 2010. In addition to being shot in Madurai, some portions were also filmed in Thiruparankundram. The cockfights were filmed using computer-generated imagery (CGI).

=== Post production ===
The post-production works on the cockfight sequences delayed the film's release. The voices for Kishore, Taapsee, and Jayapalan were dubbed by Samuthirakani, Andrea Jeremiah and Radha Ravi respectively.

== Music ==
G. V. Prakash Kumar's soundtrack consists of seven tracks. It was released by Sony Music and the audio was launched at a small function at Lady Aandal School auditorium in Chennai on 1 December 2010. The song Yathe Yathe topped the charts and remained in the No.1 position for nearly five weeks.

== Release ==
Aadukalam premiered on 12 January 2011 at Four Frames Preview Theatre, and was theatrically released two days later. It was distributed by Sun Pictures.

=== Critical reception ===
The film received critical acclaim from critics and audiences, praising the direction, screenplay and performances (particularly Dhanush, Jayapalan and Naren) and music. Sify called it "a gutsy and brilliant film" and mentioned that it " lives up to the expectation that the film carried and the credit goes to Vetrimaran whose research and hard work shows on screen". Karthik Subramanian of The Hindu praised the film stating that "The detailing of every characters in the story is intricate. The narrative moves like a good novel where the first few chapters are all about etching and detailing the players, and the plot and the action unfold much later". Pavithra Srinivasan of Rediff.com called it "one of Dhanush's best works to date". Ananda Vikatan rated the film with 44 marks and mentioned that "This arena is new for presenting cultural nuances of a region and changes in human emotions beautifully".

=== Box office ===
Made on a budget of ₹10 crore (equivalent to ₹22 crore or US$2.3 million in 2026) including the promotional costs, the film collected around ₹30 crore (equivalent to ₹67 crore or US$7.0 million in 2026) at the box-office and was declared a success. The film had a theatrical run of 15 weeks in 4 theatre centres.

== Accolades ==
Aadukalam won six awards at the 58th National Film Awards ceremony, thereby sharing the record with Kannathil Muthamittal (2002) for the most National Film Awards won by a Tamil film. It won awards under the Best Direction (Vetrimaaran), Best Actor (Dhanush), Best Screenplay (Original) (Vetrimaaran), Best Editing (Kishore Te) and Best Choreography (Dinesh) categories with a Special Jury Award being presented to V. I. S Jayapalan. The film was nominated in seven categories at the 59th Filmfare Awards South, winning Best Film – Tamil (S. Kathiresan), Best Director – Tamil (Vetrimaaran), Best Actor – Tamil (Dhanush), Best Music Director – Tamil (G. V. Prakash Kumar), and Best Cinematographer (Velraj). At the 6th Vijay Awards, it was nominated in twenty-two categories and won in five, including Entertainer of the Year (Dhanush), Best Director (Vetrimaaran) and Best Music Director (G. V. Prakash Kumar). Among other wins, the film received seven Ananda Vikatan Cinema Awards, four South Indian International Movie Awards, three Mirchi Music Awards, and one Norway Tamil Film Festival Award, Chennai International Film Festival Award, and Chennai Times Film Award each.

== Sources ==
- Dhananjayan, G. (2014). Pride of Tamil Cinema: 1931–2013. Blue Ocean Publishers. OCLC 898765509.
