= Polladhavan (2007 film) =

2007 Indian Tamil film by Vetrimaaran

- Theatrical release poster
- Directed by: Vetrimaaran
- Written by: Vetrimaaran
- Produced by: S. Kathiresan
- Starring: Dhanush; Ramya; Daniel Balaji; Kishore
- Cinematography: R. Velraj
- Edited by: V. T. Vijayan
- Music by: G. V. Prakash Kumar; Dhina (1 song); Yogi B (1 song)
- Production company: Group Company
- Distributed by: Five Star Films
- Release date: 8 November 2007
- Running time: 160 minutes
- Country: India
- Language: Tamil

Polladhavan (transl. Ruthless Man) is a 2007 Indian Tamil-language action drama film written and directed by Vetrimaaran in his directorial debut. The film stars Dhanush and Ramya, while Daniel Balaji, Kishore, Murali, Bhanupriya, Santhanam, Karunas, and Pawan play supporting roles. The film revolves around a man whose life improves after buying a bike, and turns upside down after it is stolen.

Three songs and the background score were composed by G. V. Prakash Kumar, while Yogi B and Dhina composed one song each. Velraj was the cinematographer, V. T. Vijayan edited the film and Rambo Rajkumar choreographed the stunts. The film was released on 8 November 2007 and received a positive response. It was remade in a number of languages owing to its success.

== Plot ==
Prabhu Shankar is a happy-go-lucky middle-class man who spends time playing carrom in the streets with his friends. He and his father keep falling into minor misunderstandings. He falls in love with Hema, whom he meets at a bus stop. When Prabhu is caught stealing a pittance from his father during his friend's sister's wedding, Prabhu questions his father's responsibility as his parent. Hurt by these words, his father gives Prabhu some of his savings and tells him to do something with his life. Prabhu purchases a black Bajaj Pulsar bike with the money.

While Prabhu's family initially berates him for buying the motorcycle, he soon secures a job at a bank due to his bike, earning respect at home. He develops an unbreakable attachment to his bike because it becomes his streak of luck, from getting a job to Hema eventually reciprocating his feelings. The bike eventually saves his life from a freak incident. However, it is stolen during his outing with Hema, subjecting Prabhu to unfathomable anguish as he searches for it with his friends. When his family asks about his bike, he tells them he gave it to a dealer for servicing. Prabhu comes into conflict with the underworld when he witnesses a brutal murder by a gang in Kasimedu in North Chennai by a smuggling don named Selvam and his accomplices.

Prabhu realizes that a petty thief who is in connection with Selvam's egoistical younger brother Ravi stole his bike. Prabhu traces the culprit and hands him over to the local police station. A formal complaint is lodged against the culprit on the same night. Later that night, Prabhu tells his family that his bike was stolen. His family is very upset, but Prabhu's father assures them the bike will be found in no time, having developed respect for Prabhu after he became responsible by being employed. The next morning, Ravi visits Prabhu's locality and threatens him to withdraw the complaint against the culprit. When Prabhu refuses, Ravi pushes Prabhu's father during the argument, which prompts Prabhu to hit Ravi.

Ravi's accomplices arrive at the scene, and Prabhu manages to fight them all, leaving Ravi beaten and embarrassed in public. Selvam returns home on bail from a murder charge. When he realizes what happened to Ravi, he is furious and sends his henchmen to attack Prabhu, unaware of the reason for his brother's embarrassment. Prabhu, along with Kumar, visits Selvam at his residence in Kasimedu while Ravi is away. Prabhu tells the truth to Selvam, who refuses to believe that Ravi and his men stole Prabhu's bike. After hearing from his close ally Out, Selvam believes Prabhu, apologises, and promises to do whatever he can to get Prabhu's bike back. However, it is too late for Prabhu's father, who is attacked by Ravi's men. He is admitted to a hospital, and Prabhu breaks down after learning that his father would never walk again, as his right leg was paralysed by the attack.

Selvam, Ravi, and their men visit Prabhu to condole and apologise for what happened this time. Prabhu turns down the apology, and an immediate fight is about to break out between Prabhu and Ravi before Selvam separates them, blaming Ravi for the ordeal. The attack on his father makes Prabhu realise how much he loves his father and swears to protect his family at any cost. Although he wants to stay away, Prabhu invariably gets dragged into rubbing shoulders, caused by Ravi's antics, who now targets his family to seek revenge. Prabhu's bike is caught by the NCB, and they nab him, suspecting him of drug smuggling using his bike. They release him after Prabhu tells them his bike was stolen and shows them his FIR copy, but he does not tell them about Ravi or Selvam.

Prabhu learns that Selvam's men stole his bike to escape the scene of a murder, but it was Ravi who smuggled drugs in his bike's petrol tank. Prabhu loses his job as his bike was a mode of transportation, and he is remanded to police custody for one night. Prabhu also gets despair from Hema's father for being unwillingly involved with Selvam's men. Meanwhile, Ravi makes another attempt on Prabhu's life, but he is subdued again by Prabhu. Selvam is unhappy and warns Ravi to quit smuggling if he ever gets in Prabhu's business anymore. Ravi accuses Selvam of being a non-caring brother, and Out intervenes, warning Ravi to mind his language. Surprisingly, Selvam supports his brother in lashing out at Out. Out separates briefly from Selvam after this conflict.

The next day, Selvam and Ravi get attacked by unknown gangsters when they are travelling in their car outside the city. Selvam asks his brother to stay inside the car and handles the killers on his own. He gets brutally injured, only to find out that he has been stabbed by his own brother Ravi. Ravi arranged the attack to kill Selvam. Ravi delivers the killing blow before telling Selvam that he is too complacent about Prabhu and that he is going to kill him, after which Selvam dies. Ravi creates a scene among Selvam's family and henchmen. Out, unaware of the mastermind behind the assault on Selvam, is furious and vows to kill every enemy of his mentor Selvam, including Prabhu.

Prabhu eventually gets his bike back but is disheartened to find it vandalized, so he takes it to the service centre for restoration. While there, he learns that Ravi is after him and his family. He first goes to save Hema. After securing her, he goes to save his family. He thinks that the only way to stop this is to confront Ravi himself. He takes down all the men sent by Ravi, who comes in his way.

Meanwhile, Prabhu's family is chased down in Kumar's auto rickshaw by Ravi's men. Prabhu finds Ravi hiding in an ice factory and fights him. Prabhu overpowers Ravi during the fight; the latter tries to escape from him, but Prabhu manages to subdue Ravi under the knife, threatening him to ask his men to leave Prabhu's family, which he does. Ravi's men spare Prabhu's family and Kumar.

As Prabhu is about to leave, Ravi provokes him to fight until death. Prabhu manages to dodge Ravi's swing of his knife and gets a steel rod to fatally knock him down. Out arrives at the scene after having learnt that it was Ravi who orchestrated Selvam's death. Out smiles at Prabhu and lets him go while he stares down at Ravi's corpse, satisfied that Prabhu had done his job for him, avenging Selvam's death and remembering Prabhu's words: "He is fearless and should be spared." A smiling Prabhu quietly leaves the scene on his beloved Pulsar.

== Cast ==
- Dhanush as Prabhu Shankar
- Ramya as Hema
- Daniel Balaji as Ravi
- Kishore as Selvam
- Murali as Shankar, Prabhu's father
- Bhanupriya as Thilaga, Prabhu's mother
- Santhanam as Sathish
- Karunas as Kumar
- Pawan as Out
- Boys Rajan as Hema's father
- Chetan as Prabhu's manager
- Akila as Uma, Prabhu's sister
- Sendrayan as Bike Thief
- Anju as Selvam's wife
- Manobala as Bike Showroom Manager
- Daniel Annie Pope as Prabhu's friend
- Srimurugan Rajendran as Prabhu's friend
- Munnar Ramesh as Police Inspector
- Vikram Sugumaran as Selvam's henchmen (Uncredited)
- Poonam Bajwa in a special appearance
- Brinda Parekh in the song "Alibaba Thangam"
- Yogi B in the song "Engeyum Eppothum"

== Production ==
Vetrimaaran, who earlier worked as an assistant to Balu Mahendra, prepared a script for Dhanush, who was the lead hero of the films he worked in, and Dhanush immediately accepted the offer after hearing the story. The film titled Desiya Nedunchalai 47 was initially launched with Yuvan Shankar Raja as the music director and N. K. Ekambaram as the cinematographer. After he found trouble finding producers with A. M. Rathnam and Salem Chandrasekhar leaving the project after initial interest, Dhanush's sister Dr. Vimala Geetha agreed to produce the film, but she also dropped the film. Dhanush's father Kasthuri Raja finally agreed to produce the film, and Kirat Bhattal was signed as heroine, while Harris Jayaraj was selected as music director. However, after two days of shoot, the film was shelved, and Dhanush opted to pursue other films after the surprise success of his Thiruvilayadal Arambam. The film's collapse saw Vetrimaaran approach S. Kathiresan, of Five Star Films, and narrated to him the stories he had prepared. However, Kathiresan did not like Desiya Nedunchaalai 47, but agreed to bankroll the story of Polladhavan.

Vetrimaaran has since described that he had "ample time" for his production works of Polladhavan as "Dhanush had confidence in him". Production designer Durai helped him rope in Deva to score the film's music, while Dhanush also recommended cinematographer Velraj to Vetrimaaran after the pair had worked together in Parattai Engira Azhagu Sundaram. Vetrimaaran chose Kannada language actor Kishore to make his Tamil film debut after his assistant gave him rave reviews of the actor's performance in the unfinished Prashanth-starrer Petrol. The team held test shoots with both Kajal Aggarwal and Poonam Bajwa for the film and released the stills to the media, but Kajal Aggarwal had scheduling issues with her telugu film Chandamama. Vetrimaaran had finished two schedules before finalising on Ramya. The director revealed that there was initially an issue with the actress after she got offended by his words and did not come for the shoot for three days, before Durai intervened. The film's story was inspired partly by the lost bike of his friend Andrew and the variety of experiences he had tracking down his vehicle. Vetrimaaran revealed that when he wrote the script, he made many changes to suit the visual medium and for Dhanush on his physical attributes while playing an action hero. When questioned about its relevance to Bicycle Thieves, he stated that it "is a disgrace to Bicycle Thieves if it is compared with Polladhavan".

== Soundtrack ==
Polladhavan

Soundtrack album by G. V. Prakash Kumar
- Released: 15 June 2007
- Genre: Film soundtrack
- Length: 26:53
- Label: Five Star Audio
- Producer: G. V. Prakash

G. V. Prakash Kumar chronology
Kireedam (2007)	Polladhavan (2007)	Evano Oruvan (2007)

The soundtrack consisted of five songs, three of them composed by G. V. Prakash Kumar, while rapper Yogi B and Dhina composed one track each. The song "Engeyum Eppodhum" is a remix of the same-titled song from the 1979 film Ninaithale Inikkum. Responding to allegations that the song "Minnalgall Koothadum" was a rip-off of Akon's "Smack That", Prakash Kumar stated "I may have been inspired, but I did not just copy that song".

Track listing
No.	Title	Lyrics	Music	Singer(s)	Length
1.	"Alibaba Thangam"	Yugabharathi	G. V. Prakash Kumar	Suchitra	4:59
2.	"Neeye Sol"	Vairamuthu	G. V. Prakash Kumar	Benny Dayal, Sunitha Sarathy	5:54
3.	"Engeyum Eppothum"	Kannadasan, Yogi B (rap), Yugabharathi	Yogi B	S. P. Balasubrahmanyam, Yogi B, Sunitha Sarathy	4:49
4.	"Minnalgal Koothadum"	Na. Muthukumar	G. V. Prakash Kumar	Karthik, Bombay Jayashri	6:50
5.	"Padichu Pathen"	Kabilan	Dhina	Shankar Mahadevan	4:21
Total length:					26:53

== Release and reception ==
The film was released on 8 November 2007 on Diwali day alongside Azhagiya Tamil Magan, Machakaaran, Vel and Kannamoochi Yenada.

The critic from Sify.com stating that "Vetri has made his mentor proud, and his style of narration and takings are very similar to the ace director "Balu Mahendra". The reviewer from The Hindu stated that "at no point does Polladhavan sag and that writer-director Vetrimaran has slogged through his screenplay and the result shows." Kalki praised the acting of Dhanush and other actors, Karunas's humour, Prakash's music, Velraj's cinematography, Vijayan's editing, Rajkumar's stunts and also praised Vetrimaaran for narrating old plot differently but panned the violence and song placements as speed breakers. Malini Mannath of Chennai Online wrote "With a script that is cleverly etched, its racy narration, some well-defined characters, suitably cast actors, and a realistic backdrop to the scenes, whether it's the middle-class ambience or the underworld, 'Polladhavan' turns out be a slickly packaged entertainer from debutant director Vettrimaran".

== Controversies ==
The administrators of the Thyagaraya College opposed a dialogue spoken by the character Prabhu questioning his father for making him study B. A. in the college.

== Awards ==
- The movie received four Vijay Awards, including one for Best Director.

== Remakes ==
Polladhavan was remade in Telugu as Kurradu (2009), in Kannada as Punda (2010), in Bengali as Borbaad (2014) in Sinhala as Pravegeya (2015), and in Hindi as Guns of Banaras (2020).
