= List of accolades received by Enthiran =

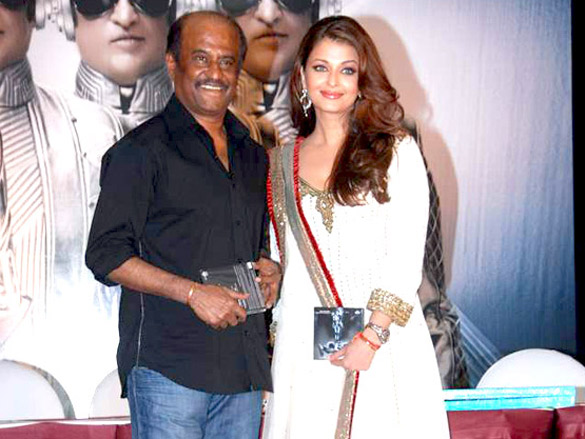
- Rajinikanth (left) with Aishwarya Rai (right) during the audio launch of Enthiran's Hindi version, Robot. The former's performance in the film garnered him several awards and nominations
Accolades
Award	Won	Nominated
Ananda Vikatan Cinema Awards	2	2
Filmfare Awards South	3	9
International Indian Film Academy Awards	3	3
Mirchi Music Awards South	1	1
National Film Awards	2	2
Norway Tamil Film Festival Awards	3	3
Screen Awards	2	2
Tamil Nadu State Film Awards	1	1
Tokyo International Film Festival	1	1
Vijay Awards	7	14
- Total number of awards and nominations (Note: Awards in certain categories do not have prior nominations and only winners are announced by the jury. For simplification and to avoid errors, each award in this list has been presumed to have had a prior nomination.)
Totals	25	38
- References

Enthiran (transl. Robot) is a 2010 Indian Tamil-language science fiction film directed by S. Shankar and produced by Kalanithi Maran. Shankar wrote the screenplay and co-wrote the dialogues with Sujatha and Madhan Karky. The film stars Rajinikanth and Aishwarya Rai with Danny Denzongpa, Santhanam, and Karunas playing supporting roles. The musical score was composed by A. R. Rahman while the cinematography, visual effects, editing, and art direction were handled by R. Rathnavelu, V. Srinivas Mohan, Anthony, and Sabu Cyril respectively. The film's story revolves around a scientist's struggle to control his creation, an android robot whose software is upgraded to give it the ability to comprehend and generate human emotions. The plan backfires when the robot falls in love with the scientist's fiancée and is further manipulated by a rival scientist to bring destruction to all who stand in its way. The film was dubbed into Hindi as Robot.

Produced on an estimated budget of ₹1.32 billion, (Note: The average exchange rate in 2010 was 45.09 Indian rupees (₹) per 1 US dollar (US$).) Enthiran was released on 1 October 2010 and yielded a revenue of ₹1.79 billion according to a report by the Sun TV Network. The film garnered awards and nominations in several categories, with particular praise for its cinematography, visual effects, art direction, costume design, and Rajinikanth's performance. The film has won 25 awards from 38 nominations.

At the 58th National Film Awards ceremony, Enthiran won two awards for Best Special Effects (Mohan) and Best Production Design (Cyril). The film was nominated in nine categories at the 58th Filmfare Awards South, winning Best Cinematographer (Rathnavelu), Best Art Director (Cyril), and Best Costume Design (Manish Malhotra). At the 5th Vijay Awards, the film was nominated in fourteen categories and won in seven, including Best Villain and Favourite Hero (Rajinikanth), Favourite Film (Maran), and Favourite Director (Shankar). Enthiran won three awards at the 12th IIFA Awards under the Best Special Effects, Best Art Direction, and Best Makeup categories. Among other wins, the film received three Norway Tamil Film Festival Awards, two Screen Awards and Ananda Vikatan Cinema Awards each, one Mirchi Music Award and Tamil Nadu State Film Awards each, and a special award at the 24th Tokyo International Film Festival.

== Awards and nominations ==
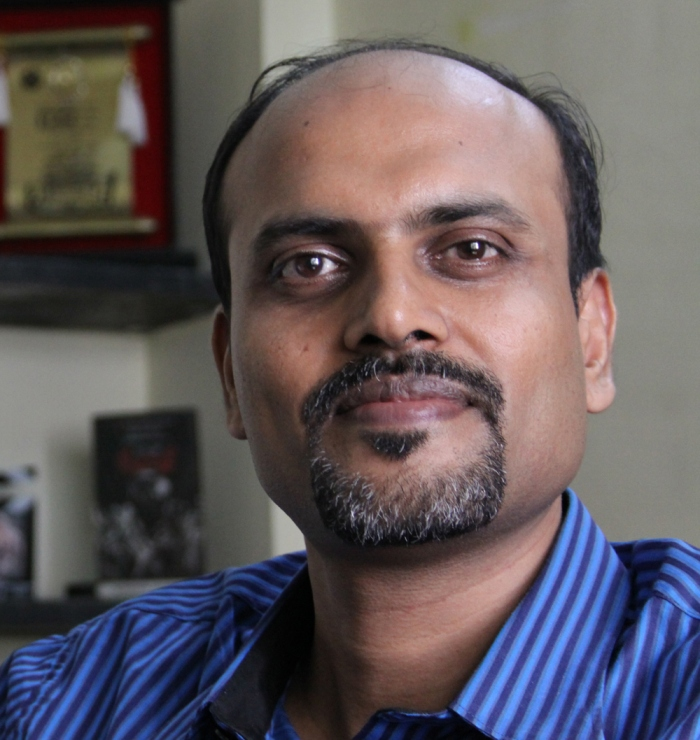
V. Srinivas Mohan received four nominations for his work in the film, winning all of them.

Award	Date of ceremony (Note: Date is linked to the article about the awards held that year, wherever possible.)	Category	Recipient(s) and nominee(s)	Result	Ref.
Ananda Vikatan Cinema Awards	13 January 2011	Best Villain – Male	Rajinikanth	Won	
Ananda Vikatan Cinema Awards	13 January 2011	Best Costume Designer	Banu	Won	
Filmfare Awards South	2 July 2011	Best Film – Tamil	Kalanithi Maran	Nominated	
Filmfare Awards South	2 July 2011	Best Director – Tamil	S. Shankar	Nominated	
Filmfare Awards South	2 July 2011	Best Actor – Tamil	Rajinikanth	Nominated	
Filmfare Awards South	2 July 2011	Best Music Director – Tamil	A. R. Rahman	Nominated	
Filmfare Awards South	2 July 2011	Best Lyricist – Tamil	Vairamuthu for "Kadhal Anukkal"	Nominated	
Filmfare Awards South	2 July 2011	Best Female Playback Singer – Tamil	Chinmayi for "Kilimanjaro"	Nominated	
Filmfare Awards South	2 July 2011	Best Cinematographer – South	R. Rathnavelu	Won	
Filmfare Awards South	2 July 2011	Best Art Director – South	Sabu Cyril	Won	
Filmfare Awards South	2 July 2011	Best Costume Design – South	Manish Malhotra	Won	
International Indian Film Academy Awards	25 July 2011	Best Special Effects	V. Srinivas Mohan	Won	
International Indian Film Academy Awards	25 July 2011	Best Art Direction	Sabu Cyril	Won	
International Indian Film Academy Awards	25 July 2011	Best Makeup	Banu	Won	
Mirchi Music Awards South	10 September 2011	Listener's Choice Award − Album	A. R. Rahman	Won (5th place)	
National Film Awards	9 September 2011	Best Special Effects	V. Srinivas Mohan	Won	
National Film Awards	9 September 2011	Best Production Design	Sabu Cyril	Won	
Norway Tamil Film Festival Awards	20–25 April 2011	Best Production	Kalanithi Maran	Won	
Norway Tamil Film Festival Awards	20–25 April 2011	Best Visual Effects	V. Srinivas Mohan	Won	
Norway Tamil Film Festival Awards	20–25 April 2011	Best Makeup	Banu	Won	
Screen Awards	6 January 2011	Best Special Effects	V. Srinivas Mohan	Won	
Screen Awards	6 January 2011	Spectacular Cutting Edge Technology	Enthiran	Won	
Tamil Nadu State Film Awards	13 July 2017	Best Female Playback	Chinmayi for "Kilimanjaro"	Won	
Tokyo International Film Festival	22 October 2011	Winds of Asia – Middle East (Special Mention)	S. Shankar	Won	
Vijay Awards	25 June 2011	Best Villain	Rajinikanth	Won	
Vijay Awards	25 June 2011	Best Cinematographer	R. Rathnavelu	Won	
Vijay Awards	25 June 2011	Best Art Director	Sabu Cyril	Nominated	
Vijay Awards	25 June 2011	Best Female Playback Singer	Chinmayi for "Kilimanjaro"	Nominated	
Vijay Awards	25 June 2011	Best Choreographer	Remo D'Souza; Raju Sundaram	Nominated	
Vijay Awards	25 June 2011	Best Stunt Director	Peter Hein	Nominated	
Vijay Awards	25 June 2011	Best Make Up Artistes	Banu	Won	
Vijay Awards	25 June 2011	Best Costume Designer	Manish Malhotra	Nominated	
Vijay Awards	25 June 2011	Best Find of the Year	Remo D'Souza; Madhan Karky	Won	
Vijay Awards	25 June 2011	Favourite Film	Kalanithi Maran	Won	
Vijay Awards	25 June 2011	Favourite Hero	Rajinikanth	Won	
Vijay Awards	25 June 2011	Favourite Heroine	Aishwarya Rai	Nominated	
Vijay Awards	25 June 2011	Favourite Director	S. Shankar	Won	
Vijay Awards	25 June 2011	Favourite Song	"Kilimanjaro"	Nominated	

== See also ==
- List of Tamil films of 2010
