= Vadivelu (disambiguation) =

Vadivelu (born 1960) is an Indian Tamil comedian and actor. Vadivelu may also refer to:

== People ==
- Boxer Vadivelu, Indian criminal
- G. A. Vadivelu (1925–2016), Indian freedom fighter

== Other uses ==
- Vadivelu Kathikesan murders
- Vadivelu filmography

== See also ==
- Vadivel (disambiguation)
