= Ananda Vikatan Cinema Awards =

Annual Tamil film awards

- Current: 13th Ananda Vikatan Cinema Awards
- Awarded for: Excellence in cinematic achievements in Tamil cinema
- Country: India
- Presented by: Ananda Vikatan
- First award: 2008
- Website: Ananda Vikatan Cinema Awards

The Ananda Vikatan Cinema Awards are annual awards in recognition of cinematic merit in the Tamil film industry. The awards ceremony is presented by the Tamil language weekly magazine Ananda Vikatan. The awards were introduced in 2008, with the first edition honouring the films that were released in 2007. The ceremony's main broadcaster is Sun TV later followed by Star Vijay.

== Main awards ==
=== Best film ===
Year	Film
2007	Paruthiveeran
2008	Anjathe
2009	Pasanga
2010	Mynaa
2011	Aadukalam
2012	Vazhakku Enn 18/9
2013	Paradesi
2014	Sathuranga Vettai
2015	Kaaka Muttai
2016	Visaranai
2017	Aramm
2018	Merku Thodarchi Malai
2019	Peranbu
2020	Jai Bhim
2022	Natchathiram Nagargiradhu
2023	Chithha
2024	Kottukkaali
2025	Bison Kaalamaadan

=== Best director ===
Year	Awardee	Film
2007	Ameer Sultan	Paruthiveeran
2008	Mysskin	Anjathe
2009	Pandiraj	Pasanga
2010	Prabhu Solomon	Mynaa
2011	Vetrimaaran	Aadukalam
2012	Balaji Sakthivel	Vazhakku Enn 18/9
2013	Bala	Paradesi
2014	Pa. Ranjith	Madras
2015	M. Manikandan	Kaaka Muttai
2016	Vetrimaaran	Visaranai
2017	Gopi Nainar	Aramm
2018	Mari Selvaraj	Pariyerum Perumal
2019	Vetrimaran	Asuran
2021	T. J. Gnanavel	Jai Bhim
2022	Manikandan	Kadaisi Vivasayi
2023	Karthik Subbaraj	Jigarthanda DoubleX
2024	Mari Selvaraj	Vaazhai
2025	Ram	Paranthu Po

=== Best actor ===
Year	Awardee	Film
2007	Sathyaraj	Periyar
2008	Kamal Haasan	Dasavathaaram
2009	Arya	Naan Kadavul
2010	Mysskin	Nandalala
2011	Vikram	Deiva Thirumagal
2012	Vijay	Nanban; Thuppakki
2013	Atharvaa	Paradesi
2014	Dhanush	Velaiilla Pattadhari
2015	Jayam Ravi	Bhooloham
2016	Rajinikanth	Kabali
2017	Vijay	Mersal
2018	Dhanush	Vada Chennai; Maari 2
2019	Dhanush	Asuran
2020 - 21	Suriya	Soorarai Pottru & Jai Bhim
2022	Kamal Haasan	Vikram
2023	Soori & Siddharth	Viduthalai Part 1 & Chithha
2024	Vijay Sethupathi	Maharaja; Viduthalai Part 2
2025	Pradeep Ranganathan	Dragon; Dude

=== Best actress ===
Year	Awardee	Film
2007	Priyamani	Paruthiveeran
2008	Parvathy	Poo
2009	Padmapriya Janakiraman	Pokkisham
2010	Anjali	Angaadi Theru
2011	Anjali	Engaeyum Eppothum
2012	Samantha Ruth Prabhu	Neethane En Ponvasantham
2013	Pooja Umashankar	Vidiyum Munn
2014	Malvika Nair	Cuckoo
2015	Nayanthara	Naanum Rowdy Dhaan
2016	Ritika Singh	Irudhi Suttru
2017	Nayanthara	Aramm
2018	Trisha Krishnan	96
2019	Taapsee Pannu	Game Over
2021	Lijomol Jose	Jai Bhim
2022	Sai Pallavi	Gargi
2023	Nimisha Sajayan	Jigarthanda DoubleX; Chithha
2024	Sai Pallavi	Amaran
2025	Mamitha Baiju	Dude

==== Multiple Wins ====
The following individuals have received two or more Best Actress awards:

Wins	Actress
2	Anjali; Nayanthara; Sai Pallavi

=== Best supporting actor ===
Year	Awardee	Film
2007	Prakash Raj	Mozhi
2008	Poo Ram	Poo
2009	Mohanlal	Unnaipol Oruvan
2010	Thambi Ramaiah	Mynaa
2011	Ilavarasu	Muthukku Muthaaga
2012	Poo Ram	Neerparavai
2013	Kishore	Haridas
2014	Kalaiyarasan	Madras
2015	Sathyaraj	Baahubali: The Beginning
2016	Samuthirakani	Visaranai
2017	Sathyaraj	Baahubali 2: The Conclusion
2018	Ameer	Vada Chennai
2019	George Maryan	Kaithi
2021	Pasupathy	Sarpatta Parambarai
2022	Kaali Venkat	Gargi
2023	Ramesh Thilak	Good Night
2024	Karunas	Pogumidam Vegu Thooramillai
2025	P. Samuthirakani	Kaantha

=== Best supporting actress ===
Year	Awardee	Film
2007	Sujatha Sivakumar	Paruthiveeran
2008	Remya Nambeesan	Raman Thediya Seethai
2009	Madhumitha	Yogi
2010	Saranya Ponvannan	Kalavani
2011	Uma Riyaz Khan	Mouna Guru
2012	Anjalai	Vazhakku Enn 18/9
2013	Dhansika	Paradesi
2014	Saranya Ponvannan	Ennamo Nadakkudhu; Velaiilla Pattadhari
2015	Ramya Krishnan	Baahubali: The Beginning
2016	Pooja Devariya	Kuttrame Thandanai
2017	Indhuja Ravichandran	Meyaadha Maan
2018	Eswari Rao	Kaala
2019	Ramya Krishnan	Super Deluxe
2020	Urvashi	Soorarai Pottru
2022	Geetha Kailasam	Natchathiram Nagargiradhu
2023	Raichal Rabecca	Good Night
2024	Swasika	Lubber Pandhu
2025	Meetha Raghunath	3BHK

=== Best screenplay ===
Year	Awardee	Film
2007	Venkat Prabhu	Chennai 600028
2008	Kamal Haasan	Dasavathaaram
2009	Samuthirakani	Naadodigal
2010	Suseenthiran	Naan Mahaan Alla
2011	Thiagarajan Kumararaja	Aaranya Kaandam
2012	Karthik Subbaraj	Pizza
2013	Nalan Kumarasamy	Soodhu Kavvum
2014	Mysskin	Pisaasu
2015	Jeethu Joseph	Papanasam
2016	Vetrimaaran	Visaranai
2017	Pushkar–Gayathri	Vikram Vedha
2018	Vetrimaaran	Vada Chennai
2019	Thiagarajan Kumararaja; Nalan Kumarasamy; Mysskin; Neelan K. Sekar	Super Deluxe
2021	Venkat Prabhu	Maanadu
2022	Hariharan Raju Gautham Ramachandran	Gargi
2023	Alfred Prakash Vignesh Raja	Por Thozhil
2024	Nithilan Saminathan	Maharaja
2025	Keerthiswaran	Dude

=== Best dialogue ===
Year	Awardee	Film
2007	Viji	Mozhi
2008	C. P. Narayanan; R. Subramanian	Abhiyum Naanum
2009	Baskar Sakthi	Vennila Kabadi Kuzhu
2010	Sargunam	Kalavani
2011	Samuthirakani	Poraali
2012	Ayyappan	Madhubana Kadai
2013	Naveen	Moodar Koodam
2014	Raju Murugan; R. Prabhu	Cuckoo
2015	Anand Annamalai; Anand Kumaresan	Kaaka Muttai
2016	Murugesh Babu; Raju Murugan	Joker
2017	Ram	Taramani
2018	Pa. Ranjith; Makizhnan B. M. Aadhavan Dheetchanya	Kaala
2019	Sabarivasan Shanmugam; Halitha Shameen	K.D. Sillu Karupatti
2021	Mari Selvaraj	Karnan
2022	Thamizharasan Pachamuthu	Nenjuku Needhi
2023	Mari Selvaraj	Maamannan
2024	Thai. Kandasaamy; Manimaran; Vetrimaaran	Viduthalai Part 2
2025	Sri Ganesh	3BHK

=== Best comedian – male ===
Year	Awardee	Film
2007	Vadivelu	Pokkiri
2008	Nassar	Poi Solla Porom
2009	Singampuli	Mayandi Kudumbathar
2010	Santhanam	Boss Engira Bhaskaran
2011	Santhanam	Deiva Thirumagal; Velayudham
2012	Santhanam	Oru Kal Oru Kannadi
2013	Sendrayan	Moodar Koodam
2014	Thambi Ramaiah	Kathai Thiraikathai Vasanam Iyakkam
2015	Karunakaran	Indru Netru Naalai
2016	Yogi Babu	Aandavan Kattalai
2017	Ramdoss	Maanagaram; Maragadha Naanayam
2018	Yogi Babu	Kolamavu Kokila; Pariyerum Perumal
2019	Anandaraj	Jackpot
2021	Redin Kingsley	Doctor
2022	Yogi Babu	Love Today
2023	Yogi Babu	Maaveeran
2024	Bala Saravanan	Inga Naan Thaan Kingu; Lubber Pandhu
2025	Harshath Khan	Dragon; Aaromaley

=== Best comedian – female ===
Year	Awardee	Film
2007	Urvashi	Malaikottai
2008	Saranya Mohan	Yaaradi Nee Mohini
2009	Aarthi	Padikkadavan
2010	Aarthi	Kutty
2011	Kovai Sarala	Muni 2: Kanchana
2012	Jangiri Madhumitha	Oru Kal Oru Kannadi
2013	Jangiri Madhumitha	Idharkuthane Aasaipattai Balakumara
2014	Kovai Sarala	Aranmanai
2015	Kovai Sarala	Kanchana 2
2016	Vinodhini Vaidyanathan	Aandavan Kattalai
2017	Urvashi	Magalir Mattum
2018	Revathi	Gulaebaghavali
2019	Urvashi	Dhilluku Dhuddu 2
2020-21	-	-

=== Best cinematographer ===
Year	Awardee	Film
2007	Ramji	Paruthiveeran
2008	R. Rathnavelu	Vaaranam Aayiram
2009	P. C. Sreeram	Yavarum Nalam
2010	Mahesh Muthuswami	Nandalala
2011	Velraj	Aadukalam; Engaeyum Eppothum
2012	Gopi Amarnath	Pizza
2013	Chezhian	Paradesi
2014	Gavemic U. Ary	Jigarthanda
2015	P. C. Sreeram	I
2016	S. R. Kathir	Kidaari
2017	Ravi Varman	Kaatru Veliyidai
2018	Nirav Shah	2.0
2019	Nirav Shah; P. S. Vinod	Super Deluxe
2021	Tanveer Mir	Psycho
2022	Ravi Varman	Ponniyin Selvan: I
2023	R. Velraj	Viduthalai Part 1
2024	Theni Eswar	Vaazhai
2025	Niketh Bommi	Dragon; Dude

=== Best editor ===
Year	Awardee	Film
2007	Raja Mohammad	Paruthiveeran
2008	Praveen K. L. N. B. Srikanth	Saroja
2009	Kishore Te	Eeram
2010	Kasi Viswanathan	Naan Mahaan Alla
2011	Kishore Te	Aadukalam
2012	Leo John Paul	Pizza
2013	Alphonse Puthren	Neram
2014	Raja Mohammad	Oru Kanniyum Moonu Kalavaanikalum
2015	Kishore Te	Kaaka Muttai
2016	Kishore Te; G. B. Venkatesh	Visaranai
2017	Raymond Derrick Crasta	Aruvi
2018	San Lokesh	Ratsasan
2019	Richard Kevin	Game Over
2021	Praveen K. L.	Maanadu
2022	Pradeep E. Ragav	Love Today
2023	Philomin Raj	Maaveeran & Parking
2024	Philomin Raj	Maharaja & Black
2025	Nagooran Ramachandran	Maayakoothu

=== Best art direction ===
Year	Awardee	Film
2007	Thotta Tharani	Sivaji
2008	Thotta Tharani	Dasavathaaram
2009	Vairabalan	Pokkisham
2010	V. Selvakumar	Madrasapattinam
2011	Rajeevan	7 Aum Arivu
2012	R. K. Vijay Murugan	Aravaan
2013	Lalgudi N. Ilaiyaraaja	Vishwaroopam
2014	C. R. Velu	Aaha Kalyanam
2015	Sabu Cyril	Baahubali: The Beginning
2016	Amit Ray; Subratha Chakraborthy	24
2017	Sabu Cyril	Baahubali 2: The Conclusion
2018	Jacki	Vada Chennai
2019	Jacki	Asuran
2021	Tha.Ramalingam	Karnan & Sarpatta Parambarai
2022	Thotta Tharani	Ponniyin Selvan: I
2023	T. Santhanam	Jigarthanda DoubleX & August 16 1947
2024	Jacki	Viduthalai Part 2

=== Best music director ===
Year	Awardee	Film
2007	Yuvan Shankar Raja	Kattradhu Thamizh; Paruthiveeran
2008	Harris Jayaraj	Dhaam Dhoom; Vaaranam Aayiram
2009	Harris Jayaraj	Ayan
2010	A. R. Rahman	Vinnaithaandi Varuvaayaa
2011	G. V. Prakash Kumar	Aadukalam; Mayakkam Enna
2012	D. Imman	Kumki
2013	Ilaiyaraaja	Onaayum Aattukkuttiyum
2014	Santhosh Narayanan	Cuckoo; Jigarthanda; Madras
2015	A. R. Rahman	O Kadhal Kanmani
2016	Santhosh Narayanan	Irudhi Suttru
2017	A. R. Rahman	Kaatru Veliyidai; Mersal
2018	Santhosh Narayanan	Vada Chennai; Pariyerum Perumal; Kaala
2019	Yuvan Shankar Raja	Peranbu; Super Deluxe
2021	Anirudh Ravichander	Master; Doctor
2022	A. R. Rahman	Ponniyin Selvan: I Venthu Thanindhathu Kaadu; Cobra
2023	Anirudh Ravichander	Jailer; Leo
2024	Sean Roldan	Lover; Lubber Pandhu
2025	Santhosh Narayanan	Retro; Thalaivan Thalaivii

=== Best music director (Background Score) ===
Year	Awardee	Film
2023	Santhosh Narayanan	Jigarthanda DoubleX
2024	G. V. Prakash Kumar	Captain Miller; Thangalaan; Amaran
2025	G. V. Prakash Kumar	Veera Dheera Sooran; Good Bad Ugly

=== Sensational Song of the Year ===
Year	Awardee	Film
2025	Sai Abhyankkar	For the song "Oorum Blood" from Dude

=== Best playback singer – male ===
Year	Awardee	Film
2007	Ilaiyaraaja	For the song "Ariyaatha Vayasu" from Paruthiveeran
2008	Hariharan	For the song "Nenjukkul Peidhidhum" from Vaaranam Aayiram
2009	Yuvan Shankar Raja	For the song "Neethane" from Sarvam
2010	Benny Dayal	For the song "Omana Penne" from Vinnaithaandi Varuvaayaa
2011	S. P. Balasubrahmanyam; S. P. B. Charan	For the song "Ayyayyo" from Aadukalam
2012	Gana Bala	For the songs "Aadi Pona Aavani" and "Nadukadalula Kappala" from Attakathi
2013	Hariharasudan	For the song "Oodha Colour Ribbon" from Varuthapadatha Valibar Sangam
2014	Pradeep Kumar	For the song "Aagayam Theepidicha" from Madras
2015	A. R. Ameen	For the song "Maula Wa Sallim" from O Kadhal Kanmani
2016	Pradeep Kumar	For the songs "Maya Nadhi" and "Vaanam Paarthen" from Kabali
2017	Anirudh Ravichander	For the song "Karuthavanlaam Galeejam" from Velaikkaran; For the song "Yaanji Yaanji" from Vikram Vedha
2018	Anthony Daasan	For the song "Sodakku" from Thaanaa Serndha Koottam
2019	Sid Sriram	For the song "Maru Vaarthai" from Enai Noki Paayum Thota
2021	Kabil Kabilan	For the song ''Adiye'' from Bachelor
2022	A. R. Rahman	For the song "Marakkuma Nenjam" from Venthu Thanindhathu Kaadu
2023	Pradeep Kumar	For the song "Kaatrodu Pattam Pola" from Ayothi; For the song "Chill Makka" from Good Night
2024	Haricharan	For the song "Hey Minnale" from Amaran

=== Best playback singer – female ===
Year	Awardee	Film
2007	Sowmya Raoh	For the song "Enadhuyire" from Bheemaa
2008	Sadhana Sargam	For the song "Mukundha Mukundha" from Dasavathaaram
2009	Janaki Iyer	For the song "Azhagaai Pookkuthey" from Ninaithale Inikkum
2010	Shreya Ghoshal	For the song "Mannipaaya" from Vinnaithaandi Varuvaayaa
2011	Saindhavi	For the song "Vizhigalil Oru Vaanavil" from Deiva Thirumagal
2012	Magizhini Manimaaran	For the songs "Soi Soi" from Kumki
2013	Shakthisree Gopalan	For the song "Nenjukkula" from Kadal
2014	Shakthisree Gopalan	For the song "Naan Nee" from Madras
2015	Shashaa Tirupati	For the song "Paranthu Sella Vaa" from O Kadhal Kanmani
2016	Nandini Srikar	For the song "Kannamma Kannamma" from Rekka
2017	Shreya Ghoshal	For the song "Neethane Neethane" from Mersal; For the song "Mazhaikulle" from Puriyatha Puthir
2018	Chinmayi	For "Kaathale Kaathale", "Thaabangaley" ,"Vasantha Kaalangal", "Anthaathi" from 96
2019	Saindhavi	For the song "Elu Vaya" from Asuran
2021	Kidakuzhi Mariyammal	For the song ''Kanda Vara Sollunga from Karnan
2022	Madhushree	For the song "Mallipoo" from Venthu Thanindhathu Kaadu
2023	Shakthisree Gopalan	For the song "Aga Naga" from Ponniyin Selvan: II; For the song "Nenjame Nenjame" from Maamannan
2024	Sinduri Vishal	For the song "Minikki Minikki" from Thangalaan

=== Best lyricist ===
Year	Awardee	Film
2007	Na. Muthukumar	Kattradhu Thamizh
2008	Thamarai	Vaaranam Aayiram
2009	Kabilan	Vettaikaaran
2010	Thamarai	Vinnaithaandi Varuvaayaa
2011	Arivumathi	Sadhurangam
2012	Yugabharathi	Kumki
2013	Na. Muthukumar	Thanga Meenkal
2014	Yugabharathi	Cuckoo
2015	Vairamuthu	O Kadhal Kanmani
2016	Thamarai	Achcham Yenbadhu Madamaiyada
2017	Na. Muthukumar	Taramani
2018	Karthik Netha	96
2019	Yugabharathi	Mehandi Circus; Asuran
2021	Thamarai	"Yaar Azhaithathu" from Maara
2022	Vivek	"Anbare" from Gulugulu "Sanda Veerachi" from Gatta Kusthi
2023	Yugabharathi	"Kangal Edho" from Chithha "Nenjame Nenjame" from Maamannan
2024	Mohan Rajan	"Ezhutha Kadhaiyo" from Lover "Aasa Orave" from Lubber Pandhu
2025	Sarathi	"Neelothi" from Sirai

=== Best costume designer ===
Year	Awardee	Film
2007	Anu Vardhan	Billa
2008	Nalini Sriram	Vaaranam Aayiram
2009	Nalini Sriram	Ayan
2010	Nalini Sriram	Vinnaithaandi Varuvaayaa
2011	Swetha	Ko
2012	Kunal Rawal; Deepali Noor; Sai	Nanban
2013	Poornima Ramaswamy; Perumal Selvam	Paradesi
2014	Sathya; Shyam Anand	Maan Karate
2015	Rama Rajamouli and Prashanti Tipirneni	Baahubali: The Beginning
2016	Anu Vardhan; Niranjani Ahathian	Kabali
2017	Neeraja Kona	Mersal
2018	Eka Lakhani	Chekka Chivantha Vaanam
2019	Uthara Menon	Enai Noki Paayum Thota
2021	Aegan Akambaram	Sarpatta Parambarai
2022	Eka Lakhani	Ponniyin Selvan: I
2023	Praveen Raja	Jigarthanda DoubleX
2024	Poornima Ramaswamy; Kavya Sriram	Captain Miller

=== Best makeup artist ===
Year	Awardee	Film
2007	Banu	Sivaji
2008	Banu; Yogesh; Vidhyadhar	Dasavathaaram
2009	Banu	Ayan
2010	Banu	Enthiran
2011	Banu; A. Kodhandapaani	7 Aum Arivu
2012	Sarathkumar	Aravaan
2013	Ralis Khan; Gage Hubard	Vishwaroopam
2014	'Pattanam' Ranjith	Kaaviya Thalaivan
2015	Nalla Srinu; Senapathi Naidu	Baahubali: The Beginning
2016	Roshan	Kaashmora
2017	Nalla Srinu; Senapathi Naidu	Baahubali 2: The Conclusion
2018	Banu; A R Abdul Razzaq; Legacy FX	2.0
2019	Banu; Nellai V. Shanmugam; K. Velmurugan	Asuran
2021	Das	Sarpatta Parambarai
2022	Vikram Gaikwat	Ponniyin Selvan: I
2023	Vinoth Sukumaran; Thanjai Ganesan	Jigarthanda DoubleX
2024	Vinoth Sukumaran; Baldev Tom	Thangalaan

=== Best choreographer ===
Year	Awardee	Film
2007	Dinesh	For the song "Vasantha Mullai" from Pokkiri
2008	Dhina	For the song "Kaththazha Kannale" from Anjathe
2009	Raju Sundaram	For the song "Nee Kobappattal Naanum" from Villu
2010	Dinesh	For the song "Jilla Vittu" from Easan
2011	Raju Sundaram	For the song "Nangaai" from Engeyum Kadhal
2012	Shobi Paulraj	For the song "Antarctica" from Thuppakki
2013	Birju Maharaj	For the song "Unnai Kanadhu" from Vishwaroopam
2014	Shobi Paulraj	For the song "Pakkam Vanthu" from Kaththi
2015	Baba Bhaskar	For the song "Maari Thara Local" from Maari
2016	Dinesh	For the song "Va Machane" from Irudhi Suttru
2017	Prabhu Deva	For the song "Damn Damn" from Vanamagan; For the song "Damukaatlaan Dumukaatlaa" from Koditta Idangalai Nirappuga
2018	Jani Master	For the song "Guleba" from Gulaebaghavali
2019	Shobi Paulraj & Lalitha Shobi	For the song "Verithanam" from Bigil
2019	Dinesh	For the song "Vaathi Coming" from Master
2022	Jani Master	For the song "Megam Karukkatha" from Thiruchitrambalam
2023	Shobi Paulraj	For the song "Scene Ah Scene Ah" from Maaveeran
2024	Sandy Master	For the song "Minikki Minikki" from Thangalaan; For the song "Makkamishi" from Brother

=== Best stunt director ===
Year	Awardee	Film
2007	Rambo Rajkumar	Polladhavan
2008	Kanal Kannan	Bheemaa
2009	Super Subbarayan	Naan Kadavul
2010	Anal Arasu	Naan Mahaan Alla
2011	Anal Arasu	Rowthiram
2012	Anal Arasu	Thadaiyara Thaakka
2013	Kecha Khamphakdee; Lee Whittaker; Parvez Feroz; T. Ramesh	Vishwaroopam
2014	Supreme Sundar	Goli Soda
2015	Miracle Michael; Larnell Stowell Jr.	Bhooloham
2016	Dhilip Subbarayan; Kaloyan Vodenicharov	Theri
2017	Dhilip Subbarayan	Theeran Adhigaaram Ondru
2018	Dhilip Subbarayan	Vada Chennai; Kaala; Chekka Chivantha Vaanam
2019	Anbu - Arivu	Kaithi
2021	Stunt Silva	Master
2022	Dhilip Subbarayan	Valimai
2023	Yaanick Ben	Maaveeran
2024	Anbariv; Stefan Richter	Amaran

=== Best production ===
Year	Awardee	Film
2007	S. P. B. Charan	Chennai 600028
2008	Moser Baer	Raman Thediya Seethai
2009	Ayngaran International	Peraanmai
2010	Ayngaran International	Angaadi Theru
2011	Fox Star Studios; ARM Productions	Engaeyum Eppothum
2012	Thirrupathi Brothers	Vazhakku Enn 18/9
2013	Lone Wolf Productions	Onaayum Aattukkuttiyum
2014	Camphor Cinema	Ramanujan
2015	Chris Pictures; JSK Film Corporation	Kuttram Kadithal
2016	Dream Warrior Pictures	Joker
2017	Dream Warrior Pictures	Aruvi
2018	Vijay Sethupathi Productions	Merku Thodarchi Malai
2019	Saregama	K.D.
2021	AP Productions	Thaen
2022	Lyca Productions; Madras Talkies	Ponniyin Selvan: I
2023	Trident Arts	Ayothi
2024	SK Productions	Kottukkaali

== Awards introduced in subsequent ceremonies ==
=== Best debut director ===
Year	Awardee	Film
2012	Balaji Tharaneetharan	Naduvula Konjam Pakkatha Kaanom
2013	Nalan Kumarasamy	Soodhu Kavvum
2014	Ram Kumar	Mundasupatti
2015	R. Ravikumar	Indru Netru Naalai
2016	Prasath Murugesan	Kidaari
2017	Arun Prabu Purushothaman	Aruvi
2018	Lenin Bharathi	Merku Thodarchi Malai
2019	Chezhiyan	To Let
2021	Madonne Ashwin	Mandela
2022	Tamizh	Taanakkaran
2023	PS Vinothraj	Koozhangal
2024	Tamizharasan Pachamuthu	Lubber Pandhu
2025	Abishan Jeevinth; Suresh Rajakumari	Tourist Family; Sirai

=== Best debut actor ===
Year	Awardee	Film
2008	M. Sasikumar	Subramaniapuram
2009	Vimal	Pasanga
2010	Atharvaa	Baana Kaathadi
2011	Vijay Sethupathi	Thenmerku Paruvakaatru
2012	Attakathi Dinesh	Attakathi
2013	Nivin Pauly	Neram
2014	Dulquer Salmaan	Vaayai Moodi Pesavum
2015	Sai Rajkumar	Kuttram Kadithal
2016	Vijay Kumar	Uriyadi
2017	Vasanth Ravi	Taramani
2018	Adithya Bhaskar	96
2019	Dhruv Vikram	Adithya Varma
2021	Hakkim Shah	Kadaseela Biriyani
2022	Kishen Das	Mudhal Nee Mudivum Nee
2023	Madhur Mittal	800
2024	Pari Elavazhagan	Jama
2025	LK Akshay Kumar	Sirai

=== Best debut actress ===
Year	Awardee	Film
2008	Rukmini Vijayakumar	Bommalattam
2009	Rupa Manjari	Thiru Thiru Thuru Thuru
2010	Amy Jackson	Madrasapattinam
2011	Iniya	Vaagai Sooda Vaa
2012	Lakshmi Menon	Sundarapandian
2013	Nazriya Nazim	Neram
2014	Catherine Tresa	Madras
2015	Deepa Sannidhi	Enakkul Oruvan
2016	Madonna Sebastian	Kadhalum Kadandhu Pogum
2017	Aditi Balan	Aruvi
2018	Raiza Wilson	Pyaar Prema Kaadhal
2019	Lijomol Jose	Sivappu Manjal Pachai
2021	Abarnathy	Thaen
2022	Aditi Shankar	Viruman
2023	Preethi Asrani	Ayothi
2024	Sri Gouri Priya	Lover
2025	Bhagyashri Borse	Kaantha

=== Best story ===
Year	Awardee	Film
2008	S. Thamizhselvan	Poo
2009	Suseenthiran	Vennila Kabadi Kuzhu
2010	Vasanthabalan	Angadi Theru
2011	Vetrimaaran	Aadukalam
2012	Balaji Sakthivel	Vazhakku Enn 18/9
2013	V. Z. Durai	6
2014	Pa. Ranjith	Madras
2015	M. Manikandan	Kaaka Muttai
2016	Suseenthiran	Maaveeran Kittu
2017	Bramma	Magalir Mattum
2018	Mari Selvaraj	Pariyerum Perumal
2019	Athiyan Athirai	Irandam Ulagaporin Kadaisi Gundu
2020	P. Virumaandi	Ka Pae Ranasingam
2022	Deepak & Muthuvel	Witness
2023	Mari Selvaraj	Maamannan
2024	Era. Saravanan	Nandhan
2025	Dhinakaran Sivalingam	Bottle Radha

=== Best child artist ===
Year	Awardee	Film
2010	Ashwath Ram	Nandalala
2011	Sara Arjun	Deiva Thirumagal
2013	Prithviraj Das	Haridas
2015	J. Vignesh; V. Ramesh	Kaaka Muttai
2016	Nainika	Theri
2017	Adrian Knight Jesly	Taramani
2018	Ditya Bhande	Lakshmi
2019	Naga Vishal	K.D.
2021	Mukesh	Mandela
2022	Hiya Dave	Naane Varuven
2023	Sahasra Shree	Chithha
2024	Ponvel. M	Vaazhai
2025	Mithul Ryan	Paranthu Po

=== Best villain – male ===
Year	Awardee	Film
2009	Rajendran	Naan Kadavul
2010	Rajinikanth	Enthiran
2011	Jackie Shroff	Aaranya Kaandam
2012	Muthuraman	Vazhakku Enn 18/9
2013	Anil Murali	6
2014	Bobby Simha	Jigarthanda
2015	Aravind Swamy	Thani Oruvan
2016	Vela Ramamoorthy	Kidaari
2017	Vijay Sethupathi	Vikram Vedha
2018	Nana Patekar	Kaala
2019	Stun Siva	Champion
2022	Lal	Taanakkaran
2023	M. S. Bhaskar	Parking
2024	Chetan	Viduthalai Part 2 Jama
2025	R. Sarathkumar	Dude

=== Best Villain – female ===
Year	Awardee	Film
2007	Jyothika	Pachaikili Muthucharam
2008	No Award	—
2009	No Award	—
2010	Reema Sen	Aayirathil Oruvan
2011	No Award	—
2012	No Award	—
2013	No Award	—
2014	Salony Luthra	Sarabham
2015	Asha Sarath	Papanasam
2016	Viji Chandrasekhar	Vetrivel
2017	Sshivada	Adhe Kangal
2018	Varalaxmi Sarathkumar	Sandakozhi 2 Sarkar
2019	Sai Dhanshika	Iruttu
2020-21	No Award	—
2022	Aishwarya Rai Bachchan	Ponniyin Selvan: I
2023	No Award	—
2024	Simran	Andhagan
2025	Andrea Jeremiah	Mask

=== Best animation and visual effects ===
Year	Awardee	Film
2015	V. Srinivas Mohan	Baahubali: The Beginning
2016	Julien Trousselier	24
2017	R. C. Kamalakannan	Baahubali 2: The Conclusion
2018	V. Srinivas Mohan; Shankar	2.0
2022	NY VFXWAALA	Ponniyin Selvan: I
2023	Jateen Thakkar, Venkat Karunakar Uday	Leo
2024	Bejoy Arputharaj	Ayalaan

=== Best Web Series ===
Year	Film
2023	Ayali
2024	Thalaimai Seyalagam

=== Most popular film ===
Year	Film
2016	Kabali
2017	Mersal
2018	2.0
2019	Bigil
2022	Love Today
2023	Jailer
2024	Aranmanai 4
2025	Dragon

=== Best Wholesome Entertainer ===
Year	Awardee	Film
2018	Suriya	Kadaikutty Singam
2019	Sathya Jyothi Films	Viswasam
2022	Lokesh Kanagaraj	Vikram
2023	S. J. Suryah	Mark Antony; Jigarthanda DoubleX
2024	Karthi	Meiyazhagan

=== Best Crew ===
Year	Film
2016	Irudhi Suttru
2017	Vikram Vedha
2018	96
2019	Comali
2021	Karnan
2022	Vikram
2023	Yaathisai
2024	Jama
2025	Naangal

=== South Indian Icon ===
Year	Awardee
2025	Rishab Shetty; Dulquer Salmaan; Keerthy Suresh

=== S. S. Vasan lifetime achievement award ===
Year	Awardee
2016	Kamal Haasan
2017	Ilaiyaraaja
2019	Bharathiraja
2020-21	Mani Ratnam
2023	AVM Saravanan
2024	S. P. Muthuraman

== Sources ==
2014 - 8th Ananda Vikatan Cinema Awards

2015 - 9th Ananda Vikatan Cinema Awards

2016 - 10th Ananda Vikatan Cinema Awards

2017 - 11th Ananda Vikatan Cinema Awards

2018 - 12th Ananda Vikatan Cinema Awards

2019 - 13th Ananda Vikatan Cinema Awards

2020 - 2021 - 14th Ananda Vikatan Cinema Awards

2022 - 15th Ananda Vikatan Cinema Awards
