= Jacki (art director) =

Indian film Production Designer

- Born: Immanuel Ambrose Jackson; Chennai, Tamil Nadu, India
- Education: Bachelors Degree in Fine Arts
- Alma mater: Madras College of Arts
- Known for: Art director, Production design

Jacki also referred to as Jackson, is Indian Production Designer and an Art Director known for his work in Tamil cinema. Over his career, he has been recognized for his distinctive set designs and innovative use of space in film storytelling.

Jacki has received multiple awards for his contributions to cinema, including the Ananda Vikatan Cinema Awards for Best Art Director for Vada Chennai (2018), Asuran (2019) and Viduthalai Part 2 (2024).

== Early life ==
Jacki was born in May 1974 as Immanuel Ambrose Jackson in Bangalore. He graduated from the Government College of Fine Arts in Chennai, India.

== Filmography ==
Year	Film	Language	Notes
2006	Poi	Tamil	
2007	Agaram	Tamil	
2007	Paruthiveeran	Tamil	
2007	Onbadhu Roobai Nottu	Tamil	
2008	Pandhayam	Tamil	
2008	Sakkarakatti	Tamil	
2009	Brides Wanted	Hindi	
2009	Indira Vizha	Tamil	
2009	Yogi	Tamil	
2010	Jaggubhai	Tamil	
2010	Theeradha Vilaiyattu Pillai	Tamil	
2010	Boss Engira Bhaskaran	Tamil	
2011	Aadukalam	Tamil	
2011	Seedan	Tamil	
2011	Engaeyum Eppothum	Tamil	
2012	Oru Kal Oru Kannadi	Tamil	
2012	Yaare Koogadali	Kannada	
2013	Samar	Tamil	
2013	Aadhi Baghavan	Tamil	
2013	All in All Azhagu Raja	Tamil	
2014	Nimirndhu Nil	Tamil	
2014	Naan Sigappu Manithan	Tamil	
2014	Thirudan Police	Tamil	
2014	Janda Pai Kapiraju	Tamil	
2015	Vasuvum Saravananum Onna Padichavanga	Tamil	
2015	Om Shanti Om	Tamil	
2015	Visaranai	Tamil	
2016	Appa	Tamil	
2017	Indrajith	Tamil	
2017	Guru	Telugu	
2017	Thondan	Tamil	
2018	Mr. Chandramouli	Tamil	
2018	Vada Chennai	Tamil	Ananda Vikatan Cinema Award for Best Art Director
2019	Asuran	Tamil	Ananda Vikatan Cinema Award for Best Art Director
2020	Naadodigal 2	Tamil	
2020	Soorarai Pottru	Tamil	
2022	Vaaitha	Tamil	
2022	Gargi	Tamil	
2022	Gulu Gulu	Tamil	
2022	Viruman	Tamil	
2022	Thiruchitrambalam	Tamil	
2023	Viduthalai Part 1	Tamil	
2024	Raayan	Tamil	
2024	Viduthalai Part 2	Tamil	Ananda Vikatan Cinema Award for Best Art Director
