= Mylapore Siva =

Indian murderer

- Born: 12 February 1979; Mylapore, Chennai
- Died: 4 March 2021 (aged 42); Ashok Nagar, Chennai
- Cause of death: Murder
- Convictions: 35-40 cases against him, including 3 murder cases

Mylapore Siva (12 February 1979 - 4 March 2021), also known as Mylai Sivakumar, was an Indian gangster, murderer, and criminal active in Chennai during the 1990s and 2000s.

Siva was born in Mylapore, Chennai. He rose to prominence during the 1990s, participating in criminal activity such as robbery, extortion, kidnapping and murder. Siva was the main accused of the murder of Thottam Sekar in 2001. Sekar was ambushed and killed by a gang of 11 people in Royapettah, Chennai. In February 2011, Siva and his brother were identified to be the prime movers of a double murder case of their two rival history- sheeters in Mylapore.

20 years after the death of Sekar, on 4 March 2021, Thottam Sekar's sons hacked Siva to death as revenge for their father's murder. Around 9:30pm in Ashok Nagar, Chennai, ten men on motorcycles and an autorickshaw and wielding long knives blocked Siva's vehicle and hacked him to death while he was out visiting a real-estate office to collect 10 lakhs. The prime accused were S. Azhaguraja and S. Balaji, the sons of the deceased rival gangster Thottam Sekar.

The 2026 Tamil language film Arasan directed by Vetrimaaran is expected to be based on Siva's life and will reportedly feature his death. The Tamil film Vada Chennai has some references to Mylapore Siva.
