= Puzhal Central Prison =

Prison in Chennai, India

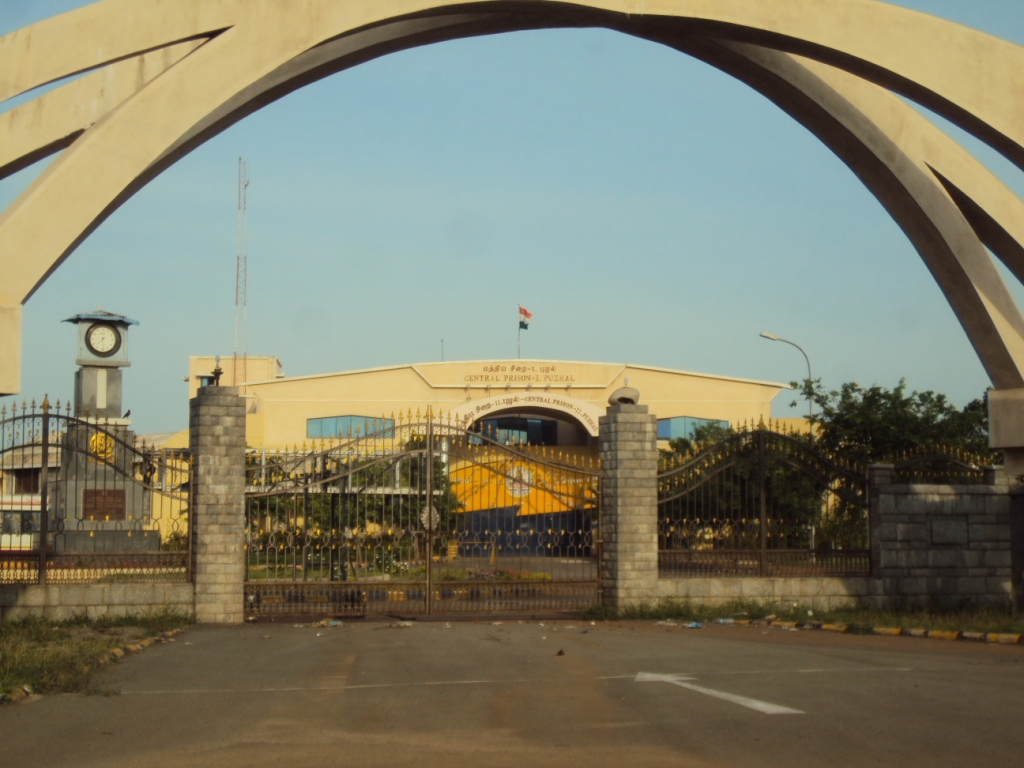

- Location in Tamil Nadu Puzhal Central Prison (India)
- Location: Chennai; 13.163193°N 80.200367°E
- Security class: Central Prison
- Capacity: 3,000
- Opened: 26 November 2006
- Managed by: Tamil Nadu Prison Department

Puzhal Central Prison is a central prison complex located in Chennai (Chennai District), India. It is about 23 km from the city centre. The prison became operational in 2006, replacing the erstwhile Chennai Central Prison.

== Construction ==
The plan for the construction of Puzhal prison was conceived during the early 2000s. Sites in Puzhal and in Maraimalai Nagar were initially considered, and the final decision to construct at Puzhal was made due to the availability of a large parcel of government-owned land. It was constructed by Tamil Nadu Police Housing Corporation (TNPHC) for a cost of ₹ 1,770 million in less than 3 years. It was inaugurated by then chief minister of Tamil Nadu, M. Karunanidhi, on 26 November 2006.

== Structure and facilities ==
It is among the largest prison complexes in India. The prison complex occupies an area corresponding to 212 acres (0.86 km^{2}). It comprises three complexes of buildings: Puzhal Prison I for convicts, Puzhal Prison II for remand prisoners and Special Prison for women. A separate enclosure houses civil debtor convicts as well. It has a quarantine to segregate new entrants till their medical examination is completed.

The facilities include cells and dormitories with windows, lavatories with doors, meditation hall, library, amphitheatre, auditorium, jail court with video-conferencing facility, mechanised kitchens, high-security blocks with exclusive kitchen and hospital, gym, canteen, public music system, rehabilitation block and separate gallows for men and women prisoners.

== Prisoners ==
The prison became operational on 26 September 2006, and the first batch of prisoners from Chennai Central Prison was transferred on 14 December 2006. The prison has facilities to house 1,251 remand prisoners, 1,250 convicted prisoners and 500 women prisoners.

== Notable incidents ==
- On 2 August 2008, Solomon, a Grade II warder, was arrested by the Directorate of Vigilance and Anti-Corruption on the charge of taking a bribe of ₹ 8,000, for providing some facilities to a Sri Lankan national lodged in the prison in connection with a fake passport case. He was later dismissed from service on 4 August 2008.
- On 10 June 2009, notorious criminal "Welding" Kumar was attacked and killed by fellow inmates.
- On 18 September 2016, Software techie Swathi murder case accused Ramkumar allegedly killed himself by biting a livewire used in a junction box.
- On 23 October 2026, two prisoners escaped from Puzhal central prison, where Chief Minister C. Joseph Vijay had conducted an inspection in August.

== In popular culture ==
Unmaking of a Monster: A documentary film by Apsara Reddy.

== See also ==
- Chennai Central Prison
