= "Welding" Kumar =

Indian criminal (died 2009)

"Welding" Kumar was an Indian criminal from Chennai, who gained infamy for an attack on a lawyer for which he was sentenced to life in prison. He was later killed in Puzhal Prison during a fight with other inmates.

== Personal life ==
He was born in Navalar Street near Korukkupettai in Chennai. He was originally known as Jeyakumar. He was believed to be about 47 to 48 years old when he died. He started his profession as a welder in Tondiarpet . He was married to Shanthi and has a daughter named Divya and a son named Sushil Kumar.

== Criminal history ==
He was accused in 25 different criminal cases including four murders. Deccan Chronicle described him as the henchman of some Tamil Nadu politicians.

He was accused of killing Radhakrishnan in 1985 and Lambamani in 1992. He attacked Chera inside the court complexes and Veeramani from Ayodhya kuppam. He was involved in an attack against lawyer Vijayan on his way to court. He received life imprisonment for attack against Radhakrishnan and Shanmugasundaram. He resorted to violence even when he was in prison. He attacked John Pandian when he was in Cuddalore jail and V. Mullaivendhan when in Salem jail.

== Advocate Shanmugasundaram case ==
He achieved notoriety in Tamil Nadu after the attack on lawyer R. Shanmugasundaram which happened on 30 May 1995. "Welding" Kumar became a household name when the CBI offered Rs. 3000 for information leading to his arrest. The DMK lawyer R. Shanmugasundaram was preparing a case against the then Chief Minister Jayalalitha in the TANSI land scam case. The attack which left him severely injured infuriated the law community in Tamil Nadu and evoked statewide protests. Kumar was subsequently convicted in that case by a local court and sent to life in prison. The ruling was later confirmed by the High court.

== Death ==
On 10 June 2009, Kumar was attacked and killed by fellow inmates in Puzhal prison. He had been transferred from Coimbatore to Puzhal prison two months before his murder. Puzhal prison officials said that his murder was a result of the hostility created by his taking over of the prison racket in which "well to do" remand prisoners deposited their mobile phones with convicts for a fee.
