= Arasan (film) =

Upcoming Indian film by Vetrimaaran

- First look poster
- Directed by: Vetrimaaran
- Written by: Vetrimaaran
- Produced by: Kalaipuli S. Thanu; Manish Shah
- Starring: Silambarasan; Vijay Sethupathi; Samantha; Priyanka Mohan; Andrea Jeremiah
- Cinematography: R. Velraj
- Edited by: R. Ramar
- Music by: Anirudh Ravichander
- Production companies: V Creations; Goldmines Telefilms
- Country: India
- Language: Tamil

Arasan (transl. The King) is an upcoming Indian Tamil-language crime action film written and directed by Vetrimaaran and produced by V Creations and Goldmines Telefilms. The film stars Silambarasan, Vijay Sethupathi, Samantha, Andrea Jeremiah and Priyanka Mohan. It is set in the same fictional universe as the director's Vada Chennai (2018).

In 2011, Vetrimaaran planned Vada Chennai with Silambarasan, but after delays, Dhanush took over as lead and producer in 2015. After acting in Chekka Chivantha Vaanam (2018), Silambarasan discussed a project with Vetrimaaran, but it later became Maanaadu (2021) with Venkat Prabhu directing. In 2025, Vetrimaaran began a new project with Silambarasan, funded by Thanu. The official title was announced in October 2025, and principal photography began in December. The film has music composed by Anirudh Ravichander, cinematography handled by R. Velraj and editing by R. Ramar.

== Cast ==
- Silambarasan as Daas
- Vijay Sethupathi
- Samantha
- Priyanka Mohan
- Andrea Jeremiah as Chandra
- P. Samuthirakani as Guna
- Kishore as Senthil
- Yogalakshmi
- Yogi Babu

== Production ==
=== Development ===
In 2011, Vetrimaaran announced that Silambarasan, along with Amala Paul, Ram Pothineni and Kishore, were cast as the lead actors for the film Vada Chennai, which was initially planned as his first venture. However, after years of production delays, in 2015, Dhanush took over as the lead actor and producer. Following the release of Chekka Chivantha Vaanam in 2018, Silambarasan considered his next project. Producer Suresh Kamatchi approached Vetrimaaran to be the director. Vetrimaaran narrated a pitch to Silambarasan, but eventually, Venkat Prabhu was finalised as the director, leading to the film Maanaadu (2021).

In early 2025, reports emerged claiming that Vetrimaaran and Suriya's Vaadivaasal had been indefinitely shelved. Soon after, other sources reported that Vetrimaaran would collaborate with Silambarasan on a new project. However, it was later clarified that Vaadivaasal was not shelved and was scheduled to begin filming November 2025. In the meantime, Vetrimaaran planned to work on the new project with Silambarasan between June (or July) and October 2025. The project is being funded by Kalaipuli S. Thanu's V Creations, who is also producing Vaadivaasal. Vetrimaaran reportedly received a No Objection Certificate (NOC) from Dhanush to reuse the title Vada Chennai for this film, which was soon after reported to be a prequel to Vada Chennai.

It was also stated that the project would be Silambarasan's 49th film, although his film with Ramkumar Balakrishnan had previously been announced as his 49th. Since Thanu is producing both Vaadivaasal and this film, Vetrimaaran was reported not to be receiving a separate remuneration, as he had already been fully paid for Vaadivaasal. On 30 June, Vetrimaaran confirmed the project and its inclusion in the Vada Chennai universe. After reports claimed that Dhanush had soon after demanded a price for the NOC, Vetrimaaran clarified that it did not happen and they received the rights without paying anything.

=== Pre-production ===
On 16 June 2025, the team shot for a promotional video for the film at Egmore in Chennai, the first for a Vetrimaaran film. The film's official title Arasan was announced in October 2025.

=== Casting ===
Samantha was announced to play a lead, pairing opposite Silambarasan. Andrea Jeremiah, P. Samuthirakani and Kishore were confirmed to reprise their roles from Vada Chennai. On 25 November, Vijay Sethupathi was announced to join the cast of the film, reuniting with Vetrimaaran after the two-part Viduthalai films and with Silambarasan after Chekka Chivantha Vaanam (2018). In December 2025, Yogalakshmi was announced to be playing the female lead, in her second feature film after Tourist Family (2025). Yogi Babu announced his participation in April 2026, and Priyanka Mohan announced hers in September.

=== Filming ===
Principal photography was initially scheduled to begin 28 November 2025, with an action sequence, featuring Silambarasan, Samuthirakani and Kishore. However, after Silambarasan cancelled a previously agreed film with Vels Film International, the production house held back the start of Arasan in order to obtain a clarity on his available. Following negotiations, Vels and Silambarasan resolved the issue, and principal photography ultimately commenced on 9 December at Kovilpatti in Madurai. In April, production was again suspended after Ishari K. Ganesh, the proprietor of Vels, demanded a ₹7.5 crore (US$800,000) settlement from Silambarasan over Corona Kumar, the cancelled film. However, it resumed the same month. After another hiatus, filming resumed in August 2026.

== Music ==
The soundtrack is composed by Anirudh Ravichander, in his first collaboration with Silambarasan and Vetrimaaran.

== Marketing ==
A promotional teaser was released on 16 October 2025, on the occasion of Anirudh's birthday, which featured Silambarasan and Nelson Dilipkumar in a cameo appearance. Although some questioned the theatre-first promo release strategy, the production team defended it, citing an intent to create a cinematic experience. That same day, N. T. Rama Rao Jr. released the promotional teaser of the Telugu version titled Samrajyam. A new promotional teaser titled "Arasan Fire" was released on 8 November 2026, coinciding with Diwali.
