= Vada Chennai =

2018 film by Vetrimaaran

- Theatrical release poster
- Directed by: Vetrimaaran
- Written by: Vetrimaaran
- Produced by: Dhanush; Subaskaran Allirajah; Vetrimaaran
- Starring: Dhanush; Andrea Jeremiah; Ameer; Samuthirakani; Kishore; Daniel Balaji; Pawan; Aishwarya Rajesh
- Cinematography: Velraj
- Edited by: G. B. Venkatesh; R. Ramar
- Music by: Santhosh Narayanan
- Production companies: Wunderbar Films; Lyca Productions; Grass Root Film Company
- Distributed by: Lyca Productions; Wunderbar Films
- Release date: 17 October 2018
- Running time: 164 minutes
- Country: India
- Language: Tamil
- Budget: ₹60 crore

Vada Chennai (transl. North Chennai) is a 2018 Indian Tamil-language crime drama film written and directed by Vetrimaaran. Produced by Lyca Productions, Wunderbar Films and Grass Root Film Company, the film stars Dhanush as Anbu, a skilled carrom player who becomes a reluctant participant in a gang war between two rival gangsters. The cast also includes Kishore, Samuthirakani, Daniel Balaji, Pawan, Andrea Jeremiah, Aishwarya Rajesh and Ameer. It is the first instalment in a planned universe.

The film had been in the news since late 2009, with an official announcement only made in November 2011 that the filming would commence by March 2012. After being temporarily shelved, the film re-materialized in May 2015 with a new cast; featuring Dhanush as the lead, making his third collaboration with the director after Polladhavan (2007) and Aadukalam (2011). Principal photography for the film, which commenced in June 2016, was wrapped up in February 2018. The cinematography for the film was done by Velraj, editing was handled by G. B. Venkatesh and R. Ramar, and the musical score was composed by Santhosh Narayanan.

Vada Chennai was initially slated to release on 13 September 2018, during the Ganesh Chathurthi festival, but was postponed to 17 October 2018, because of the post-production work. The film received critical acclaim, praising its direction, plot, music, action sequences and cast performances, while criticising its dialogues. Post-release, the film drew controversies, about the fishermen community, in which a few scenes from the film were found offensive, after the director decided to remove the scenes from the movie, and added further new scenes.

The film received several awards at the 2018 Ananda Vikatan Cinema Awards, including Best Actor for Dhanush, Best Supporting Actor for Ameer and Best Music Director for Santhosh Narayanan. At the 8th South Indian International Movie Awards, the film received several nominations, including Best Actor for Dhanush, which was the only win at the ceremony. The film was nominated in three categories at the 66th Filmfare Awards South, in which Dhanush won the Filmfare Award for Best Actor. A sequel and a prequel for the film were planned by Vetrimaaran, which will be made into a web series.

== Plot ==
1987: Sentil, Guna & Thambi

Guna, "Jawa" Pazhani, Velu, and Senthil kill a "high profile" crime boss at a restaurant in North Madras (Madras is the former name of Chennai, the capital of Tamil Nadu, India). Senthil requests Guna and Velu to surrender for the murder while he bails them out. A year later, the pair is still in prison, which creates a deep rift between them and Senthil, despite Mani(who is considered to be the godfather of the hood) and Thambi, the crime boss's younger brother intervening.

2000: Anbu, Senthil and the Jail

The new warden of the Madras central prison plans to weed out all nefarious activities in the prison, which are being controlled by Senthil from the 7th block. Senthil sells drugs worth millions every month in a very elaborate manner, and never steps out of the 7th block, fearing for his life from Guna's men in the 11th block. Anbu and Velu's brother Siva is brought into the prison for fighting. Anbu saves one of Senthil's henchmen Raju, from being killed by Siva. Anbu is placed in the 11th block under Velu and Mani. During a raid, Anbu gives away a mobile phone belonging to Mani and is almost killed for doing so, before being saved by the warden. He is shown to have saved his right hand from any injury, while being attacked.

1991: Anbu, Carrom, & Padma

Anbu, a 20 year-old skilled carrom player who has been taught to play carrom in his childhood by Rajan who was a respected person in the hood where Anbu lives in. He used to be friends with Siva who often gets him to play bet matches. On the night Rajiv Gandhi is assassinated, the entire hamlet where Anbu lives loots nearby shops and makes away with various goods. A masked girl steals a sewing machine from Anbu, but he lets her go. The next morning, the local cops, along with Thambi, arrive to recover the stolen goods. Despite having his goods returned, the shopkeeper is keen on filing a complaint against Anbu, as he had hit him the previous night under the pretext of not returning the sewing machine, Anbu then goes to Siva for help but Guna's brother Shankar who is friends with Siva tries to give Anbu his weapons to warn the shopkeeper but Anbu refuses. In turn, Anbu goes and accosts the girl Padma, but she refuses to return it. Anbu gets beaten up by the shopkeeper and loses badly in that year's carrom tournament. Anbu and Padma begin a relationship, during the course of which Anbu saves Guna from contract killers during a festival, and Guna manages to defeat them resulting in few of them getting killed. The killers then reveal that they are Senthil's men and things only worsen between Guna and Senthil.

2000: Raju helps Anbu shift to the 7th block after he cleverly smuggles in contraband for Raju. Meanwhile, Senthil is still trying to harbour political aspirations through a local politician named Muthu, who is also in prison.

1996: Anbu, Padma, & Pazhani

Pazhani teases Padma after she and Anbu are caught kissing. Pazhani also beats up Padma's brother Kannan. Anbu goes to speak to Pazhani, but is beaten up as well and Pazhini tells him that he is going to kidnap Padma with his men. After Thambi refuses to help him, Anbu and Kannan go back with weapons belonging to Guna's brother to threaten him and the duo find Pazhini drunk. They ask Pazhini to let Padma go but he refuses and finds out that Kannan has a weapon. Pazhini tries to attack Kannan only for Anbu to stab him, Kannan then stabs Pazhini when he tried to kill Anbu, and Anbu stabs Pazhini one more time which ends up killing him. Pazhani's men chase the two, but they escapes without being identified.

2000: Anbu requests Senthil to organise a carrom tournament for the prisoners, which will also help Senthil to make peace with the strict prison chief and also promote his political aspirations. The tournament is conducted throughout the prison. Senthil, Siva and Anbu all proceed to the knock-out semi-finals. The final two rounds of the tournament are held in the common prison courtyard, which implies that Senthil must come out. Velu and Mani try to utilise the opportunity to kill Senthil and heavily arm their boys. Senthil is alerted and gets ready to kill his assassins with their own weapons. However, Senthil's right thumb is injured accidentally, and he withdraws from the tournament. Anbu and Siva proceed to the finals and Anbu requests Senthil to be present for the finals to raise morale. Senthil agrees and arrives to watch the final. Seconds after Anbu wins the final, the tournament tent is collapsed and two gangs clash. During the chaos, Velu kills Senthil's informant and Senthil is able to aptly defend himself and manages to kill few of the henchmen there after defeating Siva. However, Anbu stabs Senthil in the neck with a wooden shard broken from the carrom board, leaving him heavily injured and paralysed for life. Raju is the only witness, but doesn't talk as Anbu spared his life from Siva earlier and saves him again when Siva tried to kill him again after Anbu stabbed Senthil. Later, Anbu explains to Raju about his loyalty towards Guna.

1996: Anbu, Guna, & Chandra

After Anbu and Kannan eliminate Pazhani, Thambi arranges for them to be sheltered by Guna. Guna initially believing his brother committed the crime beats his brother Shankar despite Velu and Chandra's pleas for him to stop. Shankar tells him that he did not commit the crime as he is too scared to become a don like him and berates him for his upbringing as no one in the hood is willing to respect him since he is his brother. When Anbu and Kannan reveal to Guna that they committed the crime, Guna beats Anbu up and humiliates him in front of Velu, Siva, Shankar, and his henchmen, he also tells the duo that Pazhini is dead from his wounds which shocks them. Guna then plans to send the two men far away for their safety, his wife Chandra persuades him to instead send his own brother, Shankar, to prison in Anbu’s place arguing that the move would benefit everyone involved. Guna agrees, and Anbu and Kannan are placed on boats and sent into hiding with Siva. Shankar gains respect in Guna's block and does not take Mani's warning of Senthil seriously. Within two days, Shankar is caught in prison by Senthil when he witnesses Shankar engaged in a compromising homosexual act with Raju in the bathroom as Senthil used Raju to enter Guna's block as a spy and gain Shankar's trust which Raju manages to do as Shankar becomes aroused by him and forces him to engage in certain acts. Despite Shankar's pleas Senthil kicks him and refuses to listen to him, he also has Raju tell the police that Shankar accidentally slipped in the bathroom as Senthil murders Shankar despite Shankar repeatedly telling him that he did not commit the crime and only agreed to accept the crime on his brother's orders. A devastated and guilt-ridden, Anbu vows his loyalty to Guna for life as Guna assures him that it is not his fault. Later, as Senthil seeks to secure a party leadership position, he surrenders to the authorities and proposes a truce with Guna. However, Guna soon discovers that Senthil has secretly submitted both his and Velu’s names to the police hit list. Meanwhile, Anbu approaches Padma's family to request her hand in marriage. Her father refuses, but with Kannan’s help, Anbu brings Padma to his home regardless. Simultaneously, Guna and Velu summon Anbu and outlines a plan for him to enter prison, gain Senthil’s trust, and ultimately eliminate him. Raju warns Anbu that he will be in danger if Senthil's henchmen find out that he is the real culprit and that Guna is not as caring as Senthil which leaves Anbu to wonder whether Senthil is a better person than Guna.

2000: Anbu is bailed out of prison by Guna, but tells him that he does not want to work for Guna and wants to hone carrom players instead. Anbu then marries Padma.

2003: At a coming-of-age ceremony for Thambi's daughter, a road contractor requests Guna and Senthil to come together to help in evicting people from Anbu's hamlet with the promise of houses and jobs. Anbu's friend Hameed, a bank officer, has petitioned against the project, and Guna requests Anbu's help to talk to Hameed. During the ceremony Senthil also arrives and talks caringly with Anbu treating him like his own kin. Senthil's wife Maari tries to make Guna, Velu and Thambi reveal who the real culprit behind her husband's stabbing is, as the road contractor is trying to make a truce between Senthil and Guna but Guna refuses to reveal Anbu. Later, Anbu then tells everything to Padma, including Rajan's story and how he had fought for the local people and wonders whether to betray Hameed or not despite Padma's assurance that everything will be alright.

1987: Anbu, Rajan, and the Hood

Rajan is the biggest smuggler in North Madras and works for Muthu, who is the MLA of that area. Thambi works for Rajan along with Guna, Senthil, and Velu and Rajan whom he considers as his own brothers like Thambi with Pazhini working as an aide for Senthil. Rajan trusts Senthil the most and introduces him to Muthu as Senthil wants to join politics. Muthu then requests Rajan's help with clearing out the hamlets for a road project, which was initiated for the Pope's visit. Rajan stands against Muthu and vows to protect his hood and stops his smuggling activities despite Senthil's reluctance. He also marries Chandra. Seeing that Rajan will not help him, Muthu informs the cops about his smuggling activities. When the cops arrive, Rajan kidnaps the ACP with the help of Thambi, Guna, Senthil, Velu, and Pazhini and refuses to leave him until the road project is called off even though the ACP warns them that he will responsible for all of their deaths. Rajan is hailed as a hero in the hood for stopping the project. When the Chief Minister of Tamil Nadu MGR dies, Rajan arrives at his funeral.

Meanwhile, Muthu instigates Senthil to smuggle contraband using college students of their area, and then tips the police, leading to the youngster getting arrested. Senthil, Guna, Velu and Pazhani are beaten up and publicly humiliated by Rajan for working against his wishes, and they hence plot Rajan's death. That night, they get Thambi to call Rajan to a hotel and Rajan goes with him unarmed despite Chandra's reluctance. Rajan tells Guna, Senthil, and Velu that he will help them become big and later calls in Pazhini and informs him. He tells them that he has arranged for release of the boys and he bet them just to pacify the families of those boys. Guna is hesitant to kill him despite Senthil and Velu's assurance, but when Rajan sees the weapons under the table, Senthil stabs him in the back with his knife(the same way Anbu eventually stabs him) mistakenly thinking he is trying to take his weapon. Guna and Velu berate Senthil for doing so and Rajan in a state of shock tries to reason with them only for Velu to hold him with his dhothi and Senthil has Pazhani stab Rajan the same way(Anbu and Kannan eventually stab Pazhani) despite Guna's pleas to stop. Thambi then comes to Rajan's aid, scars Guna and fights off Senthil, Velu, and Pazhani. While dying, Rajan requests Thambi to refrain from doing anything and let things be as Velu begs Thambi. Rajan then pleads with Guna and Senthil that they are everything to him and that Muthu is just using them only for Guna to strike him in the head with his kidari aruval telling him that it is hard to see him like this and that he is better off dead. He also tells him that he took everything from his life referring to Chandra as Guna fell in love with her first but refused to propose her as Rajan and Chandra eventually fell in love. Guna, Senthil, Velu, and Pazhani then hack Rajan (the dead man from the opening scene) to death leaving Thambi disheartened. Chandra vows revenge at Rajan's funeral and claims that she will not cry until all of Rajan's killers dead as a mysterious boy watches her with tears.

2003: At the meeting with the road contractor, Anbu makes a stand for the people of the hood and refuses to endorse the project. Enraged that Anbu went up against him, Guna lets Senthil's brother-in-law Kumar, a police officer, know that it was Anbu who stabbed Senthil despite Chandra and Velu's reluctance but Velu eventually agrees with Guna. Chandra then reveals to Thambi that how she was behind everything that happened and that she is doing this for Rajan, she also asks him to side with Anbu. She reveals that she had sent men who were actually loyal to Rajan to kill Guna during the festival, but Anbu saved him. She decides to marry Guna and to use him to help kill the other three involved in Rajan's death. She added Guna and Velu's names to the hit list through a police officer called Ramesh who was a trusted friend of Rajan and even had Rajan's trusted men tell Senthil and his gang about how Shankar was responsible for Pazhani's death and that he is hiding in prison to escape from him. She also drives a wedge between Guna and Velu through acussing Velu's brother Shiva. She gets Guna to leave the hood with her and has Rajan's men fight alongside Anbu against Senthil's men when they tried to kill him which resulted in the men's deaths. She then talks to Anbu and tries to persuade him to leave the hood only for Anbu to tell her that he will fight till the end for the hood, which reminds Chandra of Rajan and has his men protect him until the next day. Thambi tries to talk Senthil out of killing Anbu but he and Kumar refuse to do so and Senthil has Kumar find Anbu and kill him. Kumar arrives with few of Senthil's henchmen and finds Anbu after shooting few of Rajan's men dead, but is heavily beaten and warned by him, after Anbu manages to defeat Senthil's henchmen with the aid of Rajan's henchmen.

Anbu then traps Guna and Chandra as they leave the hood and warns Guna to leave his hood. Guna points a gun Anbu which Anbu counters with a knife to Chandra's throat. Guna then leaves with Chandra looking out of the car window at Anbu hopeful that he will avenge Rajan's death and secretly gives Rajan's old home to Anbu, who takes up Rajan's cause of fighting for the people with Kannan, Rajan's men, and rest of the people in the hood as Rajan's enemies are planning to kill Anbu.

== Cast ==
- Dhanush as Anbu
- Ameer as Rajan
- Andrea Jeremiah as Chandra
- Aishwarya Rajesh as Padma
- Samuthirakani as Guna
- Daniel Balaji as Thambi
- Kishore as Senthil
- Pawan as Velu
- Subathra Robert as Maari
- Sai Dheena as "Jawa" Pazhani
- Radha Ravi as Muthu
- Subramaniam Siva as Mani
- Vincent Asokan as ACP Jayachandran
- Rajesh Sharma as Chanchal
- Saran Shakthi as Kannan
- Hari Krishnan as Raju
- Pavel Navageethan as Siva
- Ragavendhar as Rasigan
- Munnar Ramesh as Ramesh
- G. Marimuthu as Doctor
- Sampath Ram as Police Officer
- Sendrayan as Locality resident (cameo appearance)

== Production ==
=== Origin ===
Vetrimaaran developed the story of Vada Chennai in 2003 when he met an unnamed person in the streets of North Chennai, to narrate a script about bike theft, in which he tried to explore about gangsterism and the rise and fall of mafia gangs in North Chennai. But he later decided to work on Polladhavan (2007), with Dhanush in the lead, and then, on Aadukalam (2011). During the production of Aadukalam, Vetrimaaran simultaneously scripted and modified the project. It was announced that Karthi signed the film, in October 2009. In February 2010, it was revealed that the film would see Karthi, play the lead role of a fisherman, who is drawn into a mafia gang, unwillingly. Dayanidhi Azhagiri was confirmed to produce the project, under Cloud Nine Movies, and Anushka Shetty, was announced as the female lead, who would play a Marwari girl. However, talks with Karthi fell through, after the film went through delays. In July 2010, Vetrimaaran revealed that discussions were being held with three other actors, to replace Karthi in the lead role. The film made news, without an official announcement, over the next year. Following the huge success of Aadukalam, Vetrimaaran began considering other scripts, instead.

In October 2011, the producers announced that the film would re-start soon and feature Silambarasan, as the main lead, in place of Karthi. Rana Daggubati and Kishore were cast in other pivotal roles, with Vetrimaaran adding that the story of Vada Chennai was first written in 2003, and that he took notes from the first script, to make his other two films. Vetrimaaran's usual team, consisting of cinematographer Velraj, editor Kishore T.E., art director Jacki, and music director G. V. Prakash Kumar, from Polladhavan and Aadukalam, were retained and confirmed to be part of the main crew. The director confirmed that Andrea Jeremiah would also play a pivotal supporting role. Divya Spandana, who previously worked with Vetrimaaran in Polladhavan, was approached for a role in January 2012, but she did not sign the film. In a turn of events, Rana Daggubati opted out of the film, in February 2012, citing date issues and the delay of the film. Furthermore, it was alleged that the delay of the film had also irked Silambarasan, with reports suggesting that Jiiva would replace him, if Silambarasan walked out of the project. In April 2012, Dayanidhi Azhagiri announced that the project was postponed and announced that Vetrimaaran would move on to make another film for his production house, with Dhanush in the lead. Vetrimaaran subsequently contemplated making several different projects with the actor in the lead, before beginning filming for Soodhadhi in March 2014. Months into production, the film was postponed, like Vada Chennai.

=== Development ===
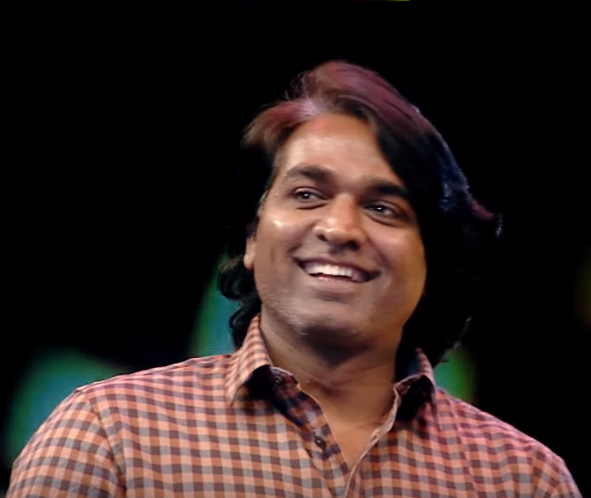
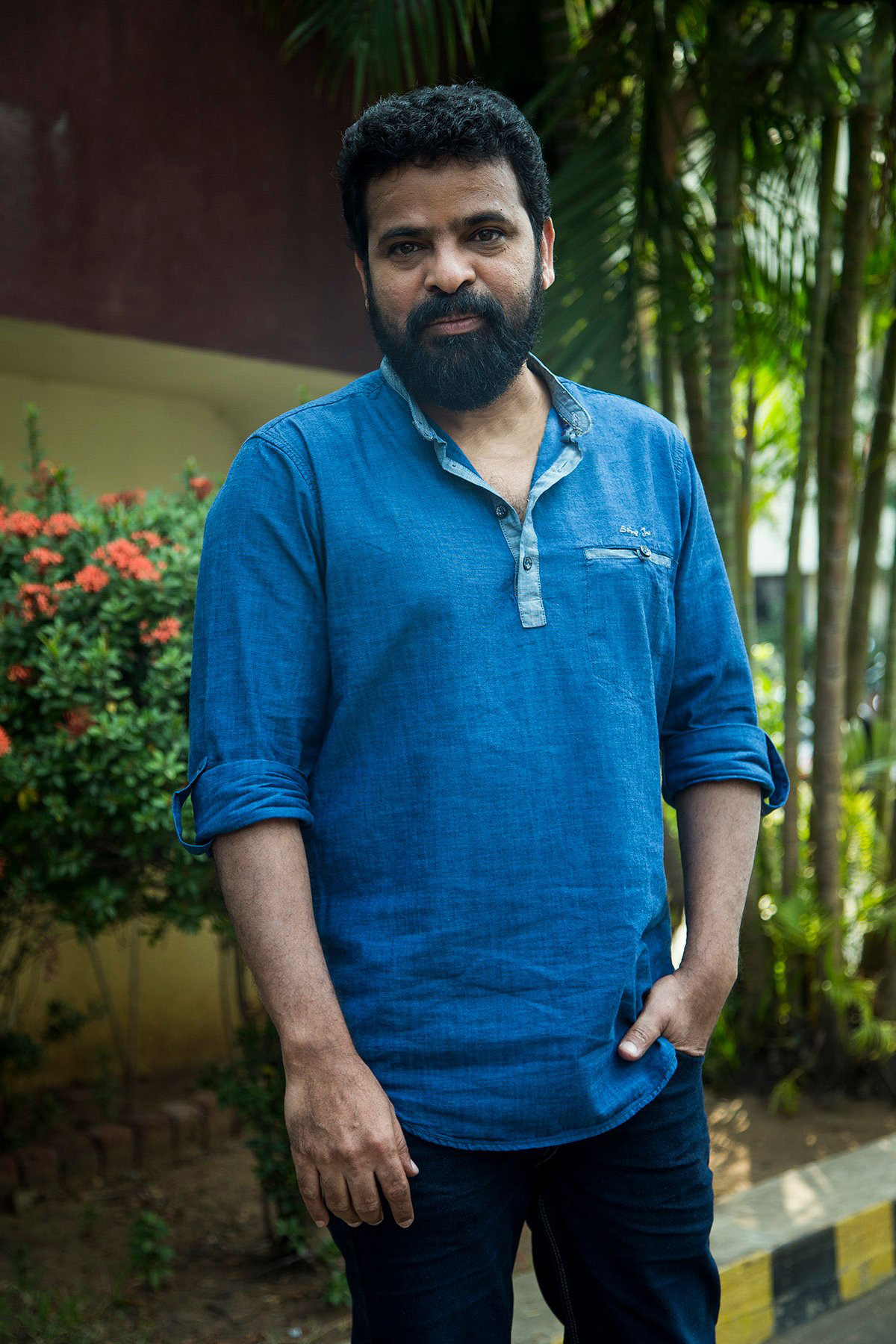
Vijay Sethupathi was initially cast as the character of Rajan, but exited the project due to production delays, resulting in Ameer replacing him.

In May 2015, Dhanush revealed that he would produce and feature in Vada Chennai, and that the venture would restart production, in September 2015. Samantha and Andrea Jeremiah were revealed to be among the lead actresses, while Santhosh Narayanan would be the film's composer, after Dhanush had fallen out with G. V. Prakash Kumar. Also, G. B. Venkatesh, who assisted Kishore Te on Visaranai (2016), was roped in as the film editor, after the latter's unfortunate demise, due to his health problems. The start of the project was postponed until 2016, as Dhanush had to complete his outstanding projects, first. In August 2015, Vetrimaaran announced that Vada Chennai will be made into two-parts, citing Anurag Kashyap's advice to split the film into two, similar to his Gangs of Wasseypur films. Dhanush decided to allot more than 200 days for his role, for both the parts. However, with Lyca Productions's inclusion in the project, the film was extended into a trilogy. Unlike his previous films which were inspired by other works, including novels and films, Vada Chennai is an original and fictional representation revolving around gangsters in North Chennai.

In late 2015, the team held talks with Jiiva and Vijay Sethupathi, again, for portraying other pivotal characters in the film, though neither of them signed the project. Samuthirakani and Daniel Balaji were subsequently signed on to portray other pivotal roles. Likewise several actors who have previously worked on Vetrimaaran's films such as Kishore, Karunas and Pawan, joined the cast during June 2016. Before the film's shoot started, Samantha opted out of the film citing schedule conflicts, and was replaced by Amala Paul in the lead female role. Vijay Sethupathi also agreed to portray an extended cameo in the film, with Dhanush announcing his inclusion during July 2016. However, owing to a delay in the film's shooting, both Vijay Sethupathi and Amala Paul exited the project, with the pair being replaced by Ameer and Aishwarya Rajesh. Before Sethupathi's replacement with Ameer, it was reported that he left the project due to scripting and call-sheet issues, and Vetrimaaran decided to rope in Telugu actor, Ravi Teja, for the role, as he was impressed with the script and role. However, he also could not take up the role, due to his ongoing projects in Telugu films.

=== Pre-production ===
In the first meeting with the executive producer, I was asked how much it would cost the build the prison set. I took a wild guess and said around ₹10 crore (US$1.1 million) and I wasn’t even asked a question. I was asked to start the work immediately as they wanted the prison set to be completed to start the shoot. When most producers would ask to cut short the budget, Dhanush and his team gave us a lot of creative freedom and time to work. That may have possible because of the relationship Dhanush shares with Vetrimaaran.

— Art director Jacki, on the creation of the jail set in an interview with Firstpost.

Art director Jacki, worked on the film's production design. The set design for Vada Chennai began nearly six years ago and before the beginning of the production, Jacki designed huge sets resembling the Central Jail and had made the team cost ₹5 crore (US$530,000). The team initially decided to shoot the portions of the film in a real jail set in Rajamahendravaram, but as the prison portions may become lengthy during the course of the film, they decided to construct a huge set resembling the Madras Central Prison at the Binny Mills in Chennai. He visited the original location and also met a prisoner from Madras Prison to give inputs for the location. The construction initially planned for 43 days, was completed within 40 days. Later, the team had erected another set resembling the Nagoorar Thottam and for that design, the team had spent 20 days. Then, as most of the film being set in the slum area, the team did a miniature model of the design which they planned to replicate in real. To reflect the timeline change (1970–2000), the team went through an extensive research and collected every minute details of the products, including furnitures, materials, home appliances, posters, cigarettes, advertisements and essentials used, which the team had considered as "the biggest challenge". Amritha Ram worked on the costumes for the film. A report from Sify claimed that the film is the "costliest film ever made in Dhanush's career" as Jacki had stated that the work on the production design escalated the costs in the film.

=== Filming ===
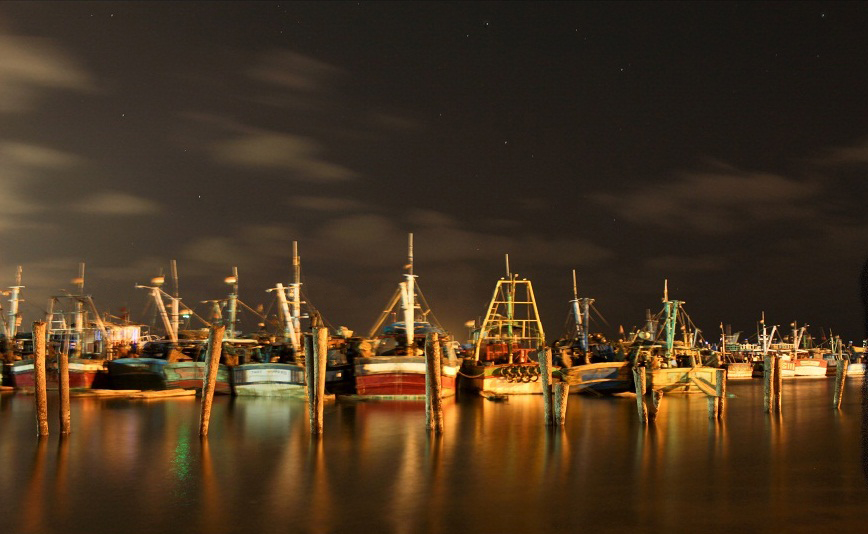
A significant portion of the film was shot in Royapuram, Chennai

The film's production began on 22 June 2016, after multiple postponements. The first schedule of the shooting was held at a huge set resembling the Madras Central Prison which was erected at Binny Mills in Chennai. The shoot continued throughout mid-2016 in North Chennai for thirty days, with scenes depicting the 1970s shot. The production was briefly delayed as Vetrimaaran sought to get his previous film, Visaranai, ready for nominations at the 89th Academy Awards, which prompted Dhanush to move on to work on his other projects: his directorial debut Pa. Pandi, Velaiilla Pattadhari 2 and his international debut film, The Extraordinary Journey of the Fakir. The break between schedules also meant that Vetrimaaran began pre-production work on another film starring G. V. Prakash Kumar, which he would make following the completion of the first part of Vada Chennai. However, it was revealed that Vetrimaaran was not ready to work simultaneously on the three parts of the film and reported that they may take a break in-between the production of the trilogy, where Dhanush and Vetrimaaran planned for three-to-four films in the process.

The second filming schedule began in April 2017 in Royapuram, Chennai, and progressed for 30 days. However, the shooting further affected as Dhanush had worked on The Extraordinary Journey of the Fakir. It was revealed that the team had completed 90% of the shooting within late-June 2017, and only 10–15 days of shooting left. But during the film's production, Dhanush also prioritised to work on the long delayed Gautham Menon's project Enai Noki Paayum Thota and Maari 2, which escalated the film's delay. Later, Dhanush decided to work on both the projects simultaneously, in order to complete the shoots of both the films within time. The filming was completed within February 2018.

== Music ==
The film was initially announced with G. V. Prakash Kumar as the music director. However, following Kumar's fallout with the lead actor Dhanush, the team chose Santhosh Narayanan as the film composer, which marked his maiden collaboration with Vetrimaaran. Dhanush suggested Santhosh's name when he composed for one of his production, the Rajinikanth-starrer Kaala (2018), and with his inclusion, he simultaneously worked for both the films; the work on the entire album was completed within June 2018. The album is mostly based North Madras music consisting of a diverse genres – gaana, folk and melody. Vada Chennai also marked Santhosh's 25th filmas a composer in his career. The album was released on 23 September 2018, in entirety through the internet and in streaming platforms such as Saavn, JioMusic and Gaana. The soundtrack received rave reviews from critics and audience, and topped the iTunes charts within three days of its release. It was also streamed above 5,00,000 times on Saavn. An additional song titled "Patta Patti" was released during mid-November 2018, after repeated requests from fans.

== Marketing and release ==
Vetrimaaran worked on the post-production of Vada Chennai, assembling the final cut of the film during mid-May 2018. In June 2018, the makers confirmed that Vada Chennai will be released theatrically on the occasion of Ganesh Chathurthi (13 September 2018). The teaser trailer for the film was unveiled on the occasion of Dhanush's birthday (28 July 2018) and received positive response from fans. Furthermore, celebrities such as Shah Rukh Khan and Anurag Kashyap praised Dhanush and Vetrimaaran's work in the teaser. The makers unveiled a set of posters featuring the lead characters starting from 6 August 2018. In mid-August, Dhanush announced that Vada Chennai, will be released worldwide on 17 October 2018, coinciding the Dusshera weekend. The film was premiered at the Pingyao International Film Festival in China before the theatrical release, and also premiered at the 23rd International Film Festival of Kerala in November 2018. The merchandise of Vada Chennai, was launched by Cover It Up and Fully Filmy on 15 October 2018, as a part of the film's promotion.

Four days before the theatrical release, the film was sent to the Central Board of Film Certification (CBFC), where it received an A certificate, due to "raw and gritty violence". Scenes where dialogues mentioning and referring to the former Chief ministers J. Jayalalithaa, M. G. Ramachandran and M. Karunanidhi, were removed from the film, as it was considered defaming the politicians. Post-release, the film drew criticism for allegedly portraying the residents of North Chennai in a bad light. The film also drew controversies from fisherfolk community, because of a love-making scene between Ameer and Andrea was pictured in a boat, which was considered to be offensive for the community. Director Vetrimaaran, in a video statement, apologised to anyone who may have been hurt by the film. Then the director agreed to remove the offensive scenes from the film.

== Reception ==
=== Box office ===
In the first day of theatrical release, Vada Chennai earned ₹81 lakh (US$87,000) from the Chennai city box-office and ₹5.12 crore (US$550,000) in over 300 screens. The film gained $48,840 (₹56 lakh) from the premiere shows screened in United States on 16 October, a day before the Indian release. The film further earned ₹54 lakh (US$58,000) from the second day at Chennai box-office, and had collected ₹4.2 crore (US$450,000) worldwide. Within the third day, the film earned ₹4.9 crore (US$520,000) at the worldwide box-office, tallying its three-day collection to ₹15.6 crore (US$1.7 million). During its theatrical run in the weekends, the film enjoyed good footfalls and had collected ₹10.5 crore (US$1.1 million) within two days, adding its worldwide collection to ₹28.1 crore (US$3.0 million). The film grossed ₹2.5 crore (US$270,000) in Karnataka, ₹50 lakh (US$53,000) in rest of India, and ₹10 crore (US$1.1 million) at the overseas centres (combined collections in the United States, Malaysia, United Arab Emirates and other centres). Within two weeks of its release, the film earned ₹50 crore (US$5.3 million) at the worldwide box office, surpassing Velaiilla Pattadhari to emerge the highest-grossing Tamil film of Dhanush's career, until its record was broken by Asuran, another film directed by Vetrimaaran. In addition, the film crossed the ₹6 crore-mark at the Chennai box office.

=== Critical response ===
Vada Chennai received critical acclaim, with critics praising its plot, action sequences, technical aspects and cast performances.

Janani K, a critic from India Today gave a rating of 4 out of 5 stars and wrote "Vada Chennai has everything you look for in a gangster thriller. But Vetri Maaran's display of twists and turns will win you over." Manoj Kumar. R of The Indian Express gave 5 out of 5 stars and wrote "Vada Chennai is the closest you can get to unforgiving underworld filled with insecurity, revenge, destiny, rage and insatiable urge for bloodshed. It is not the story that stands out in Vada Chennai. It is how beautifully Vetrimaaran has captured the lifestyle of a place, which is so close and yet so far away from the advancement of modern civilization."

Sowmya Rajendran of The News Minute wrote "From the colourful curses of the street to each of the characters, the film gives us a very real glimpse of gang wars. Vetrimaaran-Dhanush delivers a brilliant gangster film." Srivatsan S of The Hindu wrote "The obvious political overtones that have been built throughout will have its relevance in part two. If anything, Vada Chennai reiterates why Vetri Maaran is a master storyteller." Priyanka Sundar of Hindustan Times stated the film Vada Chennai, the first part of a three-part film, "is complete in itself speaks for director’s Vetrimaaran’s execution style". She further called it as a "bloody brilliant film laced with some bone chilling moments accompanied with ingenious music". Anupama Subramanian of Deccan Chronicle gave 4 out of 5 stars and wrote:

Vada Chennai, for most parts, keeps it real: The men are full of flaws that are indicative of their backgrounds and upbringing, and the women don't shy away from displaying their anger and greediness. The proceedings tend to drag a bit and the flashbacks could have been reduced. Also, a more careful use of cuss words would have had a greater impact on the scenes. As it stands, the story is a bit slipshod, but the characters and the layered writing will ensure that your attention stands.

M. Suganth of The Times of India gave 3.5 out of 5 stars and wrote "The sprawling nature of the narrative and the various events that impact the lives of the numerous characters make Vada Chennai truly an epic." Sreedhar Pillai of Firstpost gave 3.5 out of 5 stars and wrote "Vada Chennai is another feather on Vetrimaaran’s cap though not in the same league as his earlier films. The way he has built into the story, the rise of gangsters and thrown in political allegories is brutally honest. It also shows how politicians and the slum lords, in the name of development and welfare of the people, are similar in their opportunistic approach and selfish interests." He gave the film three-and-a-half out of five stars.

Sify gave 3.5 out of 5 stars and wrote "Vada Chennai takes its time to unfold, and you may enjoy if you muster the patience for it. Give it a chance, watch it for some excellent acting and for its gritty realistic feel." Baradwaj Rangan of Film Companion South wrote "Dhanush's ascent to stardom has come alongside his growth as an actor, and there’s not one scene where he makes us doubt his character's actions. The actors are so good (Ameer is a standout) and the film's parts are so much greater than the whole that savouring them becomes its own kind of satisfaction. With his outstanding cinematographer Velraj, Vetrimaaran unleashes one flamboyant scene after another."

=== Accolades ===
Award (Note: Awards, festivals and organisations are in alphabetical order.)	Date of ceremony (Note: Date is linked to the article about the awards held that year, wherever possible.)	Category	Recipient(s) and nominee(s)	Result	Ref.
Ananda Vikatan Cinema Awards	5 January 2019	Best Actor	Dhanush	Won	
Ananda Vikatan Cinema Awards	5 January 2019	Best Supporting Actor	Ameer	Won	
Ananda Vikatan Cinema Awards	5 January 2019	Best Screenplay	Vetrimaaran	Won	
Ananda Vikatan Cinema Awards	5 January 2019	Best Art Direction	Jacki	Won	
Ananda Vikatan Cinema Awards	5 January 2019	Best Music Director	Santhosh Narayanan (Also for Kaala and Pariyerum Perumal)	Won	
Ananda Vikatan Cinema Awards	5 January 2019	Best Stunt Director	Dhilip Subbarayan (Also for Kaala and Chekka Chivantha Vaanam)	Won	
Asianet Film Awards	20 March 2019	Best Tamil Actor	Dhanush (Also for Maari 2)	Won	
Asiavision Awards	17 February 2019	Best Actor – Critics	Dhanush (Also for Maari 2)	Won	
Behindwoods Gold Medal	16 December 2018	Best Actress – Critics choice	Andrea Jeremiah	Won	
Edison Awards	26 February 2019	Best Actor	Dhanush	Won	
Filmfare Awards South	21 December 2019	Best Film – Tamil	Dhanush, Subaskaran Allirajah, Vetrimaaran	Nominated	
Filmfare Awards South	21 December 2019	Best Director – Tamil	Vetrimaaran	Nominated	
Filmfare Awards South	21 December 2019	Best Actor – Tamil	Dhanush	Won	
Pingyao International Film Festival	30 September 2018	Best Film (People's Choice Award)	Dhanush, Subaskaran Allirajah, Vetrimaaran	Won	
South Indian International Movie Awards	15–16 August 2019	Best Film – Tamil	Wunderbar Films	Nominated	
South Indian International Movie Awards	15–16 August 2019	Best Director – Tamil	Vetrimaaran	Nominated	
South Indian International Movie Awards	15–16 August 2019	Best Actor – Tamil	Dhanush	Won	
South Indian International Movie Awards	15–16 August 2019	Best Supporting Actor – Tamil	Ameer	Nominated	
South Indian International Movie Awards	15–16 August 2019	Best Supporting Actress – Tamil	Andrea Jeremiah	Nominated	
South Indian International Movie Awards	15–16 August 2019	Best Cinematographer – Tamil	Velraj	Nominated	
Tamil Nadu State Film Awards	29 January 2026	Best Actor	Dhanush	Won	
Tamil Nadu State Film Awards	29 January 2026	Best Actress (Special Prize)	Aishwarya Rajesh (also for Kanaa)	Won	
Tamil Nadu State Film Awards	29 January 2026	Best Villain	Samuthirakani	Won	
Tamil Nadu State Film Awards	29 January 2026	Best Supporting Actor	Ameer	Won	
Tamil Nadu State Film Awards	29 January 2026	Best Music Director	Santhosh Narayanan	Won	
Tamil Nadu State Film Awards	29 January 2026	Best Cinematographer	R. Velraj	Won	
Vanitha Film Awards	3 March 2019	Best Tamil Actor	Dhanush	Won	

== Legacy ==
Director Anurag Kashyap also heaped praise on the direction and screenplay, calling it as "an original gangster film". Directors Gautham Vasudev Menon and Vineeth Sreenivasan too praised the film, the latter called Vetrimaaran as the director "needed to be celebrated". Kashyap also had the first cut of the film, along with other Tamil films being preserved in his library. In a May 2021 interview with Indian cricketer Ravichandran Ashwin, Vetrimaaran revealed about his voice-over used in the opening narrations, and said that "when the film's release date was nearing, he could not trim the film to the desired duration, so he came up with the idea of voice over only three days before the film's release date". A dialogue from the film "Senthil, Guna, Velu, Thambi ivanga ellarum Anbu vaazhkaiyoda inaikkuradhu Rajan dhan" (transl. Rajan is the only person, who brought Senthil, Guna, Velu and Thambi into Anbu's life), has been used widely in internet memes.

== Future ==
Post Vada Chennai's success, many sources claimed about the sequel of the film, after Dhanush and Vetrimaaran collaborated for Asuran (2019). In July 2019, there were reports being surfaced that the sequel of the film will be shelved, Dhanush clarified that the sequel will progress. It was reported that the sequel will be made into a streaming series format instead of a feature film, as Vetrimaaran revealed that "some of the events including the 2004 Tsunami and other political incidents, had to be shown and this may overshoot the proposed budget", hence he decided to make the sequel into a digital format. Vetrimaaran also revealed that he planned the first film into a streaming series instead of making into a feature.

== Spin-off ==
=== Rajan Vagaiyaraa ===
Rajan Vagaiyaraa (transl. Rise of Rajan) was initially conceived by Vetrimaaran as a prequel to Vada Chennai, focusing on the life of Rajan, played by Ameer. Vetrimaaran stated in interviews that he was deeply fascinated by the character and originally intended to develop a standalone web series. Extensive flashback sequences featuring Rajan were shot during Vada Chennai's production. While only some were used in the final cut, the remaining footage, edited into a narrative exceeding two hours, was compiled as a separate film titled Rajan Vagaiyaraa. As of 2025, the film remains unreleased. In March 2021, it was reported that the prequel might resume development following Vetrimaaran's other commitments (Viduthalai Part 1 and Part 2, and Vaadivaasal).

=== Arasan ===
In June 2025, Vetrimaaran began production on a film starring Silambarasan tentatively titled STR49 which is set in the same universe as Vada Chennai.Anirudh Ravichander is the composer for the film. Ameer, Andrea Jeremiah, Samuthirakani and Kishore, who were associated with the original film, were cast to reprise their roles, with Vijay Sethupathi having a cameo appearance in this film. The film is being co-produced by Silambarasan under his newly formed production company, Atman Cine Arts.

== See also ==
- Mylapore Siva
- Vetrimaran
