= Achchani =

1978 film by Karaikudi Narayanan

- Theatrical release poster
- Directed by: Karaikudi Narayanan
- Written by: Karaikudi Narayanan
- Based on: Achchani (play) by Karaikudi Narayanan
- Produced by: Karaikudi Narayanan; Sethu Sundaram
- Starring: Muthuraman; Lakshmi; Ashokan
- Cinematography: K. S. Bhaskar Rao
- Edited by: Kandhaswamy
- Music by: Ilaiyaraaja
- Release date: 4 February 1978
- Running time: 110 minutes
- Country: India
- Language: Tamil

Achchani (transl. Axle) is a 1978 Indian Tamil-language drama film directed by Karaikudi Narayanan, starring Muthuraman, Lakshmi and Ashokan. It is based on Narayanan's play of the same name. The film was released on 4 February 1978 and became a success.

== Cast ==
- Muthuraman
- Lakshmi
- Ashokan
- Thangavelu
- Gopalakrishnan
- Srikanth
- Suruli Rajan
- Jayachandran
- Manorama
- Kanchana
- Shoba
- Tambaram Lalitha

== Production ==
Achchani is based on the play of the same name. The play was previously filmed in Malayalam under the same name. Karaikudi Narayanan who wrote the play also directed the film adaptation making his directorial debut. Narayanan revealed despite wanting Jaishankar as the lead actor, he chose Muthuraman as per the producer's suggestion. The producer faced financial struggles during the shoot as he could not afford enough film rolls and money which led to the filming being stopped and getting restarted after six months. It was Meenakshi Sundaram who owned Ganesh Theatre at Melur and helped providing finance to complete the film.

== Soundtrack ==
The soundtrack was composed by Ilaiyaraaja, with lyrics by Vaali. The song "Thaalaattu" is set in the Carnatic raga known as Madhyamavati. Ilaiyaraaja composed the songs "Maatha Un Kovilil" and "Thalatta Pillaiyundu" within three hours. "Maatha Un Kovilil" was re-used in Naan Kadavul (2009).

Track listing
No.	Title	Singer(s)	Length
1.	"Athu Maathiram"	Manorama, Malaysia Vasudevan	3:25
2.	"Maatha Un Kovilil"	S. Janaki	4:53
3.	"Naan Azhaikkiren"	P. Susheela	3:18
4.	"Thaalaattu"	S. P. Balasubrahmanyam, P. Susheela	3:05
Total length:			14:41

== Release and reception ==
Achchani was released on 4 February 1978, and was commercially successful. Free India said the film "fails to make the impact the drama had on the audience. The story exhorts one and all to desist from borrowing even in the wake of worst of crisis".
