= Naan Kadavul =

2009 Indian Tamil-language art film

- Theatrical poster
- Directed by: Bala
- Written by: Jeyamohan (dialogue)
- Screenplay by: Bala
- Based on: Yezhaam Ulagam by Jeyamohan
- Produced by: K. S. Sreenivasan
- Starring: Arya; Pooja; Rajendran
- Cinematography: Arthur A. Wilson
- Edited by: Suresh Urs
- Music by: Ilaiyaraaja
- Production company: Vasan Visual Ventures
- Distributed by: Vasan Visual Ventures; Pyramid Saimira
- Release date: 6 February 2009
- Running time: 127 minutes
- Country: India
- Language: Tamil

Naan Kadavul (transl. I am God) is a 2009 Indian Tamil-language action drama film directed by Bala and produced by K. S. Sreenivasan under Vasan Visual Ventures. The film is based on the Tamil novel Yezhaam Ulagam by Jeyamohan, who also penned the film's dialogues. The film stars Arya, alongside Pooja Umashankar, Rajendran, Krishnamoorthy, Azhagan Thamizhmani and Vijaya Bharathi. The music was composed by Ilaiyaraaja, while cinematography and editing were handed by Arthur A. Wilson and Suresh Urs respectively.

Naan Kadavul was released on 6 February 2009 to critical acclaim from critics. The film earned National Film Awards, including the Best Director Award, four Vijay Awards, three Tamil Nadu State Film Awards and two Filmfare Awards. It was also shown at film festivals, such as the 2008 Fantastic Fest and the 2009 Beloit International Film Festival.

== Plot ==
A man who left his son Rudhran in Kashi, Varanasi due to astrological reasons, returns 14 years later, repenting his act, with his daughter in search of Rudhran and finds him there, but is shocked to learn that Rudhran has become an Aghori, a fierce, tigerish sadhu who gives moksha and prevents the soul from getting reborn. Nevertheless, the man brings Rudhran back to Tamil Nadu as he had promised Rudhran's mother. Thandavan, a ruthless person, oversees a group of physically and mentally challenged beggars. Among the beggars is Hamsavalli, a blind girl, who was separated from her group of street actors. Hamsavalli soon becomes a victim of Thandavan's cruelty.

Meanwhile, Rudhran leaves his house to find his place in a small cave near a hill temple. Despite pleas from his mother and Hamsavalli, Rudhran refuses to come back home. Thandavan makes a deal with a businessman to sell some of his beggars to him for a tidy profit. The man forcefully takes the beggars away and returns with a man with a deformed face, trying to force Hamsavalli to marry him for ₹10 lakhs. Thandavan orders his men to bring Hamsavalli, whose friends take her to Rudhran for help. Rudhran fights Thandavan's men and kills the businessman, where he is arrested by the local police, who are forced to leave him as they are not able to locate the body and are afraid of forcing a confession from Rudran for fear of being cursed.

Hamsavalli seeks protection and solace from the church, but Thandavan finds Hamsavalli and tortures her as she refuses to marry the deformed man, thus making him lose the money. An enraged and humiliated Thandavan beats up Hamsavalli. Thandavan appears face-to-face against Rudran and fights him, where Rudhran kills Thandavan. A badly wounded Hamsavalli finds her way to Rudhran and beseeches him to free her from her misery and the earthly life. Hamsavalli also pleads with Rudhran to grant her moksha so that she never has to be born again. Rudhran fulfills her wish and slashes Hamsavalli's throat, performs her last rites and returns to Kashi.

== Cast ==
- Arya as Rudran aka Bhagwan Kaal Bhairav (The Aghori)
- Pooja as Hamsavalli
- Vijaya Bharathi as Rudran's mother
- Ranjini Hariharan as Rudran's younger sister
- A. Krishnamoorthy as Murugan
- Rajendran as Thandavan
- Meesai Rajendran as the police inspector

Uncredited

- Singampuli as Kuyyan
- Kanakarajsamy as a Murugan devotee

== Production ==
=== Development ===
After the release of Pithamagan (2003), Bala began to work on a script for a film for which he sought inspiration from a scene in Anbe Sivam which had inspired him to make his film, referring to a scene where Kamal Haasan states to Madhavan that "when we love others unconditionally without any expectation, we become Gods". It was announced that the film, Naan Kadavul, would star Ajith Kumar in the lead role and produced by A. M. Rathnam. However Ratnam, the producer of the film dropped out in December 2004, opting to concentrate on his Telugu film Bangaram and his son's venture, Kedi. As pre-production work continued, Ajith grew his hair for the role and subsequently appeared in a song in the much-delayed film, Varalaru with the long hair he grew for Naan Kadavul, when doing patchwork. The film was briefly shelved in August 2005 and Ajith moved on to sign other films such as P. Vasu's Paramasivan, which was initially set to be produced by Bala, and Perarasu's Thirupathi. The film then re-emerged and in April 2006, Bala announced the technical crew of the film revealing that Arthur A. Wilson would be cinematographer, Krishnamoorthy as art director and that Ilaiyaraaja would score the film's music. Pre-production on the film began in early 2006, with Bala's assistants already scouting for ideal filming locations in the city of Varanasi. Ajith announced that the shoot of the film would start in the city in May 2006, with the actor refusing to speculate the story of the film. However, as the film yet again failed to take off, Ajith finally pulled out of the project in June 2006 stating he could wait no longer for Bala.

=== Casting ===
It was reported that Narain, who also made his debut with Chithiram Pesuthadi, would do the role but producers wanted a more saleable name, and hence Arya was signed up. Arya was eager to appear in the film but had already given dates to Saran for Vattaram, and unsuccessfully attempted to drop out of that film to allot dates for Naan Kadavul. Saran's refusal meant that Arya had to wait and complete the film before joining Bala's team. Bhavana was signed for the film after the success of Chithiram Pesuthadi, replacing Meera Jasmine. Ravi, director of Vignesh starrer Aacharya and Kannan, director of Raasaiyya, made their debuts as actors with this film. Rajendran, a fight master who earlier appeared in a small role in director Bala's previous film Pithamagan was selected to play main villain thus making his debut as full-fledged actor. The film also introduced 175 new faces to the screen in which most of them being physically challenged people. The film was consequently launched in June 2006 at Hotel Green Park, Chennai with P. L. Thenappan's Sri Rajalakshmi Films as producers. Arya grew his hair out for the film.

=== Filming ===
The photo shoot of the film was held in August 2006 with Arya and Bhavana and images of Arya were released showing him in different postures of Yoga including Sirasasanam and Padmasanam. The film's first schedule began later that month in Nazarethpettai, near Chennai. Shoots continued in Kasi and Varanasi in January 2007, with Arya opting against working in any other films till Naan Kadavul was complete. Producer Thennapan also backed out of the film in early 2007 but Srinivasan of Vasan Visual Ventures took over swiftly.

Bhavana also walked out of the film in early 2007 as she was unable to allot dates for the film and a search for another new cast member began. Actress Pooja was later finalised as lead actress in September 2007 and joined the sets of the film in Periyakulam in late 2007. She revealed that she went to the audition of the film only after being compelled by Seeman and thought twice about accepting the film due to her commitments in a Sinhalese film, before the producer of that film released her from her contract.

== Soundtrack ==
The songs were composed by Ilaiyaraaja. The audio was released on 1 January 2007. Lyrics have been penned by Vaali except for the track Pitchai Paathiram which has been penned by Ilaiyaraaja himself and the title song "Maa Ganga" written by Bharath Achaarya. The song "Matha Un Kovilil" was reused from Raja's own song which he had composed for Achchani (1978).

The song "Maa Ganga" is set in Yaman, "Om Sivoham" is set in Pantuvarali, and "Pitchai Paathiram" is set in Vakulabharanam. The songs, "Kannil Paarvai" and "Oru Kaatril Alaiyum", are set in Rasikapriya, whereas "Matha Un Kovilil" and "Amma Un Pillai Naan" are set to Sindhu Bhairavi.

Track listing
No.	Title	Lyrics	Singer(s)	Length
1.	"Maa Ganga"	Bharath Achaarya	Kunal Ganjawala	3:14
2.	"Om Sivoham"	Vaali	Vijay Prakash	4:21
3.	"Kannil Paarvai"	Vaali	Shreya Ghoshal	4:55
4.	"Matha Un Kovilil"	Vaali	Srimathumitha	0:43
5.	"Amma Un Pillai Naan"	Vaali	Sadhana Sargam	5:04
6.	"Oru Kaatril Alaiyum"	Vaali	Ilaiyaraaja	4:53
7.	"Pitchai Paathiram"	Ilaiyaraaja	Madhu Balakrishnan -	5:08
Total length:				28:18

== Release ==
=== Critical response ===
Malathi Rangarajan of The Hindu called it "a rare offering for intrepid folks who plump for true-to-life depictions". The Times of India wrote, "At a time when the clutter of routine commercial cinema gets to you, it's apt that you resort to an eerie film like Naan Kadavul." Pavithra Srinivasan of Rediff.com gave the film a rating of three out of five stars, writing, "Naan Kadavul is definitely worth a watch for its superb secondary characters, setting and music", but noted weaknesses with the script, describing it as lacking "punch." Svrinavasan wrote, "Aside from mumbling mantras at strategic points, Rudhran doesn't do anything much ... Very little of the sharp-sightedness that's gone in showcasing the world of beggars has gone into the mental make-up of Rudhran, and it shows." Sify wrote, "Watch Naan Kadavul, because it's one of those films that won't easily get out of your head long after the film is over."

=== Accolades ===
Award	Category	Nominee	Outcome	Ref.
56th National Film Awards	Best Director	Bala	Won	
56th National Film Awards	Best Make-up Artist	U.K. Sasi	Won	
57th Filmfare Awards South	Best Tamil Actress	Pooja	Won	
57th Filmfare Awards South	Best Tamil Director	Bala	Nominated	
57th Filmfare Awards South	Best Tamil Actor	Arya	Nominated	
57th Filmfare Awards South	Best Tamil Film	K. S. Sreenivasan	Nominated	
57th Filmfare Awards South	Best Tamil Supporting Actor	Rajendran	Nominated	
57th Filmfare Awards South	Best Tamil Lyricist	Ilayaraja for "Pitchai Paathiram"	Nominated	
Tamil Nadu State Film Awards	Best Female Character Artiste	Pooja	Won	
Tamil Nadu State Film Awards	Best Villain	Rajendran	Won	
Tamil Nadu State Film Awards	Best Cinematographer	Arthur Wilson	Won	
Vijay Awards	Best Director	Bala	Won	
Vijay Awards	Best Actress	Pooja	Won	
Vijay Awards	Best Villain	Rajendran	Won	
Vijay Awards	Best Make up	U.K. Sasi	Won	

== Bibliography ==
- Dhananjayan, G. (2014). Pride of Tamil Cinema: 1931–2013. Blue Ocean Publishers. OCLC 898765509.
