= Asuran (2019 film) =

2019 Indian film by Vetrimaaran

- Theatrical release poster
- Directed by: Vetrimaaran
- Screenplay by: Vetrimaaran; Manimaran; SuKa
- Based on: Vekkai by Poomani
- Produced by: Kalaipuli S. Thanu
- Starring: Dhanush; Manju Warrier; Ken Karunas
- Cinematography: R. Velraj
- Edited by: R. Ramar
- Music by: G. V. Prakash Kumar
- Production company: V Creations
- Release date: 4 October 2019
- Running time: 140 minutes
- Country: India
- Language: Tamil

Asuran (transl. Demon) is a 2019 Indian Tamil-language period action drama film directed by Vetrimaaran and produced by Kalaipuli S. Thanu. It is based on the novel Vekkai (transl. Heat) by Poomani. The film stars Dhanush, along with Manju Warrier (in her Tamil debut), Ken Karunas, and Teejay Arunasalam. G. V. Prakash Kumar composed the film's music. The cinematography was handled by Velraj, with editing by R. Ramar.

Asuran was released in theatres on 4 October 2019. The film was a commercial success at the box office. The film won two awards at the 67th National Film Awards—Best Feature Film in Tamil and Best Actor (Dhanush). It was one of the ten Indian films to be screened at the 78th Golden Globe Awards (2021) under the Best Foreign Film category. It was also screened at the 51st International Film Festival of India in the Indian Panorama section. The film was remade in Telugu as Narappa (2021).

== Plot ==
In the late 1970s in Kovilpatti, a man and his young son trek across a remote river while carrying homemade bombs. Elsewhere, a woman, a man, and a young girl hide from a heavy police search. The man and boy are Sivasaami and his younger son, Chidambaram, while the other group consists of Sivasaami's wife, Pachaiyamma, her brother, Murugesan, and her daughter, Lakshmi.

The family members are Dalit farmers residing in the southern village of Thekkoor. Sivasaami shares a deep bond with his eldest son, Velmurugan, but remains distant and borderline abusive towards Chidambaram. Their lives shatter when Narasimhan, a wealthy upper-caste landlord from the neighboring northern village of Vadakoor, demands the family's three-acre farm to construct a factory. The family, led by an uncompromising Velmurugan, flatly refuses to sell. In retaliation, Narasimhan's sons assault Pachaiyamma. Velmurugan fiercely retaliates by severely injuring the attackers, which leads to his immediate imprisonment.

Sivasaami desperately begs Narasimhan for his son's release. Narasimhan demands that Sivasaami humiliate himself by kneeling before every resident of the upper-caste village as atonement. When Velmurugan learns of his father's public degradation, he beats Narasimhan with a slipper. Seeking absolute vengeance, Narasimhan's henchmen, led by a ruthless hunter named Kariyan, ambush and behead Velmurugan, discarding his naked, headless torso in the family's field. Paralyzed by grief and unable to seek legal recourse without the head as evidence, the family suffers in silence for a year until Chidambaram, consumed by rage, assassinates Narasimhan. Sivasaami witnesses the execution, cuts the local power lines to mask their escape, and flees into the wilderness with Chidambaram.

In the present timeline, Kariyan tracks the pair down and nearly kills Chidambaram. Sivasaami intervenes, single-handedly overpowering the henchmen but choosing to spare their lives. As they recover, Sivasaami reveals his violent, hidden past to his son to explain his restraint.

Twenty years prior, Sivasaami is a notorious, fiercely loyal moonshine brewer working for a powerful landlord named Viswanathan. Sivasaami secures a clerical position for Pandiyan, a distant relative of his employer. Concurrently, Sivasaami's brother, Murugan, and a Brahmin Communist lawyer, Venugopal Seshadri, fight to reclaim illegally seized Panchami Land for their marginalized community. During this time, Sivasaami falls deeply in love with Mariyamma, and their marriage is finalized. When Sivasaami gifts Mariyamma a pair of sandals, an infuriated Pandiyan brutally assaults her for defying caste norms, forcing her to walk with the footwear on her head. Sivasaami retaliates by publicly beating Pandiyan with slippers and binding him. Though reprimanded by Viswanathan, Sivasaami abandons brewing to join his brother's land rights movement.

Tragedy strikes on the eve of a major labor rally. While Sivasaami is away retrieving legal authorization documents, Pandiyan and his mercenaries slaughter Murugan and his allies, subsequently burning Sivasaami's entire family—including Mariyamma—alive inside their huts. Enraged, Sivasaami launches a gruesome massacre, killing Viswanathan, Pandiyan, and their entire enclave. He flees the region and is later found by Murugesan, who taught him farming and introduced him to Pachaiyamma. After sharing his tragic history, an admiring Pachaiyamma accepts him, and Sivasaami serves a reduced prison sentence before marrying her.

In the present, learning of his father's formidable past, Chidambaram develops a profound respect for him. The family briefly reunites before Sivasaami and Chidambaram seek legal aid from Seshadri, who agrees to represent them on the condition that they surrender to the court. The following day, Narasimhan’s surviving kin ambush them at the courthouse, forcing them back into hiding. To permanently ensure his family's safety, Sivasaami reluctantly signs away his disputed land.

However, the landlords violate the truce, abducting and torturing Chidambaram. Pushed to his limit, Sivasaami wages a final, bloody battle, killing the mercenaries and wiping out Narasimhan’s remaining male lineage, though both he and Chidambaram sustain severe injuries. Murugesan and an armed vanguard of villagers arrive to defuse further escalation, and both sides agree to end the generational blood feud to prevent an all-out caste war.

Sivasaami ultimately stands before the court, prepared to take full legal responsibility for the killings to shield Chidambaram. He implores his son to pursue education and secure a powerful bureaucratic position, poignantly noting that while landlords can strip them of wealth and land, they can never seize their education. Sivasaami smiles serenely at his family as he enters the courthouse.

== Cast ==
- Dhanush as Sivasaami, a villager
- Manju Warrier as Pachaiyamal, Sivasaami's wife
- Ken Karunas as Chidambaram, Sivasaami's and Pachaiyamal's younger son
- Teejay Arunasalam as Velmurugan, Sivasaami's and Pachaiyamal's elder son
- Pasupathy as Murugesan, Pachaiyamal's elder brother
- Prakash Raj as Venugopal Seshadri, a lawyer
- Ammu Abhirami as Maariammal, Sivasaami's late love interest
- Balaji Sakthivel as Inspector
- Subramaniam Siva as Murugan, Sivasaami's brother
- Aadukalam Naren as Vaddakuran Narasimhan, a Rich upper caste landlord
- Pawan as Venkatesan, Vaddakuran's younger brother
- Bala Hasan as Rajesh Narasimman, Vaddakuran's son
- Rajapandi as Hunter, Kariyan's Gang
- Tamizh as Kariyan
- A. Venkatesh as Viswanathan
- Nitish Veera as Pandiyan
- Velraj as Panchayat Member
- Sendrayan as Pechimuthu, a cobbler
- Munnar Ramesh

== Production ==
=== Development ===
After the release of Velaiilla Pattadhari 2 (2017), producer Kalaipuli S. Thanu signed a three-film deal with Dhanush. After the success of Vada Chennai (2018), Vetrimaaran announced plans for making the film's sequel with Dhanush reprising his role. However, Vetrimaaran and Dhanush agreed to do another film for Thanu before working on the sequel.

On 21 December 2018, Dhanush announced the film's title, with a poster. Filming was planned as to shoot in January 2019. G. V. Prakash Kumar was signed as the music compose, collaborating with the director and actor after Polladhavan (2007) and Aadukalam (2011). The film was reported to be set in 1960s to 1980s period, with Dhanush playing a man of his mid-40s.

=== Casting ===
Karunas was initially offered the lead role but declined, feeling the role needed a better known actor, resulting in Dhanush being cast. Malayalam actress Manju Warrier was cast in the female lead role, which marked her debut in Tamil film industry. Ken Karunas and Teejay Arunasalam were cast as Dhanush's sons, with the latter marking his acting debut. Sai Pallavi was approached for a role, which later went to Ammu Abhirami. Director Balaji Sakthivel, also made his acting debut, essaying an important role in the film. Pasupathy was cast in a supporting role. He joined the sets in February 2019. Later, Aadukalam Naren and Pawan were also cast in the film.

=== Filming ===
Principal photography of the film began on 26 January 2019, with the first schedule of the shoot being held at Tirunelveli. Dhanush was reported to play a dual role of father and son in the film as per sources. Initially, the actor was reported to play a dual role in another film directed by R. S. Durai Senthilkumar, which was titled Pattas (2020). While the film's shoot was progressing in full swing, Dhanush was reported to kick start his shoot for Pattas, later he took a break and resumed shooting for the film in April 2019. The final schedule of the film began in May 2019. It was revealed that the makers planned to wrap the film's shoot by June 2019.

== Music ==
The soundtrack album and background score is composed by G. V. Prakash Kumar, collaborating with Dhanush and Vetrimaaran for the third time after Polladhavan and Aadukalam. The soundtrack album consists of seven songs, with lyrics written by Ekadesi, Yugabharathi, Eknath, and Arunraja Kamaraj. The film's album was launched on 2 September 2019, coinciding with the occasion of Ganesh Chathurthi at a launch event held at Prasad Studios in Chennai, where Dhanush, Manju Warrier, Ammu Abirami, Ken Karunas, singer-turned-actor Teejay Arunasalam, director Vetrimaaran, composer G. V. Prakash Kumar, and producer S. Thanu were in attendance, and the album was released in all streaming platforms and on YouTube, the same day. The film's music, including the background score, received positive responses from both audiences as well as critics, with songs "Kathari Poovazhagi", "Yen Minukki" and "Ellu Vaya Pookalaye" were well received by audiences, benefiting to the success of the film.

== Release ==
Asuran was originally planned to be released on 2 October 2019, coinciding with the occasion of Gandhi Jayanti and the weekend of the Vijayadashami festival in India. On 8 August, the makers advanced the release date by one day to 4 October.

== Reception ==
=== Critical reception ===
Asuran received critical acclaim.

Sify rated the film 4.5 out of 5, summarising that "Asuran is a must-watch. Dhanush-Vetrimaaran combo who has once again delivered a raw, rustic, and riveting revenge drama. Don't miss this one!" S. Subhakeerthana from The Indian Express rated the film 4 out of 5 and reviewed it as "With this Dhanush starrer, Vetrimaaran proves he's one of the finest directors in Indian cinema, yet again. Only a few filmmakers like him can pull off a mainstream cinema, balancing 'realism' and commercial elements."

Sreedhar Pillai from Firstpost rated the film 4 out of 5 and posted a verdict " Asuran is one of the best films of the year and a must-watch. Vetrimaran keeps the flag of good cinema flying high." Janani K from India Today, rated the film 3.5 out of 5 and stated that "Director Vetri Maaran's Asuran is a thrilling revenge drama of an oppressed family in a village. With solid writing backed by brilliant performances, Asuran is a classic film."

The Times of India, rated 3.5 out of 5 stars, stating that "Vetri Maaran delivers yet another solid action drama that keeps us engrossed from start to finish." Behindwoods rated 3.25/5, stating that "Asuran is an engaging watch with strong performances, interesting plot and an amazing emotional connect with the audience throughout." Krupa Ge from Silverscreen said, "Asuran is a bloody revenge saga, that's also weirdly enough about the futility of violence... Watching the film, after reading the book (Vekkai), feels like dipping in and out of the novel, to wander off to the sides of the pages, filled with detours and notes. It starts where the novel starts, but goes back and forth, imagining what could have been."

Gauthaman Baskaran from News18, gave contrary reviews by rating the film 2 out of 5, stating that "Coming at a time when graphic and lurid on-screen violence is being questioned and even condemned, Asuran would appear needlessly falling back to the old formula." Baradwaj Rangan of Film Companion South wrote, "None of the characters feel fully formed because the timelines feel rushed. We don't feel time and lives weigh down on us the way it did in Vada Chennai or Visaranai. Maybe it's the on/off voiceovers, which feel like hastily applied band-aids over sore spots in the storytelling. But the bigger absence is the lack of set pieces. Vetri Maaran seems to be holding back almost deliberately, as though mirroring his leading man".

A critic from the HuffPost wrote that the film has taken inspiration from Kilvenmani massacre of 1968, using as a plot device.

=== Box office ===
Asuran grossed approximately ₹16 crore in Tamil Nadu in its first weekend. The film collected ₹3.35 crore (US$522,198.1) in Kerala in 10 days. The film grossed over ₹66.25 crore worldwide.

== Accolades ==
Year	Award	Category	Recipient(s)	Result	Ref
2019	Tamil Nadu State Film Awards	Best actor female	Manju Warrier	Won	
2020	Zee Cine Awards	Best Director	Vetrimaaran	Won	
2020	Zee Cine Awards	Best Actor	Dhanush	Won	
2020	Zee Cine Awards	Best Background Score	G. V. Prakash Kumar	Won	
2020	Zee Cine Awards	Best Costume Designer	Perumal Selvam	Won	
2020	Zee Cine Awards	Best Female Playback Singer	Saindhavi	Nominated	
2020	Zee Cine Awards	Best Actress	Manju Warrier	Nominated	
2020	Zee Cine Awards	Favourite Heroine	Manju Warrier	Nominated	
2020	Zee Cine Awards	Favourite Hero	Dhanush	Nominated	
2020	Zee Cine Awards	Find of the Year	Ken Karunas	Won	
2020	Ananda Vikatan Cinema Awards	Best Director	Vetrimaaran	Won	
2020	Ananda Vikatan Cinema Awards	Best Actor - Male	Dhanush	Won	
2020	Ananda Vikatan Cinema Awards	Best Actor-Female	Manju Warrier	Nominated	
2020	Ananda Vikatan Cinema Awards	Best Supporting Actor	Ken Karunas	Nominated	
2020	Ananda Vikatan Cinema Awards	Best Art Direction	Jacki	Won	
2020	Ananda Vikatan Cinema Awards	Best Playback Singer – Female	Saindhavi	Won	
2020	Ananda Vikatan Cinema Awards	Best Lyricist	Yugabharathi	Won	
2020	Ananda Vikatan Cinema Awards	Best Makeup Artist	Banu; Nellai V. Shanmugam; K. Velmurugan	Won	
2020	22nd Asianet Film Awards	Best Female Actress (Tamil)	Manju Warrier	Won	
2020	Norway Tamil Film Festival Awards	Best Film	Kalaipuli S. Thanu	Won	
2020	Norway Tamil Film Festival Awards	Best Director	Vetrimaaran	Won	
2020	Norway Tamil Film Festival Awards	Best Playback Singer – Female	Saindhavi	Won	
2020	Norway Tamil Film Festival Awards	Best Stunt Choreography	Peter Hein	Won	
2021	67th National Film Awards	Best Actor	Dhanush	Won	
2021	67th National Film Awards	Best Feature Film in Tamil	V Creations (Producer) Vetrimaaran (Director)	Won	
2021	9th SIIMA Awards	Best Director	Vetrimaaran	Won	
2021	9th SIIMA Awards	Best Film	Asuran	Nominated	
2021	9th SIIMA Awards	Best Actor	Dhanush	Won	
2021	9th SIIMA Awards	Best Actress	Manju Warrier	Nominated	
2021	9th SIIMA Awards	Best Actress (Critics)	Manju Warrier	Won	
2021	9th SIIMA Awards	Best Cinematographer	R. Velraj	Won	
2021	9th SIIMA Awards	Best Debut Actor	Ken Karunas	Won	
2021	9th SIIMA Awards	Best Lyrics	Yuga Bharthi -Ellu Vaya Pookalae	Nominated	
2021	9th SIIMA Awards	Best Male Playback Singer	Velmurugan	Nominated	
2021	9th SIIMA Awards	Best Female Playback Singer	Saindhavi	Won	
2021	9th SIIMA Awards	Best Music Director	G. V. Prakash Kumar	Nominated	

== Remake ==
Asuran was remade in Telugu as Naarappa in 2021, starring Venkatesh and directed by Srikanth Addala. Kalaipuli S. Thanu returned as the producer of the film along with Daggubati Suresh Babu under their banners V. Creations and Suresh Productions.
