= Madras Central Prison =

Former prison in India

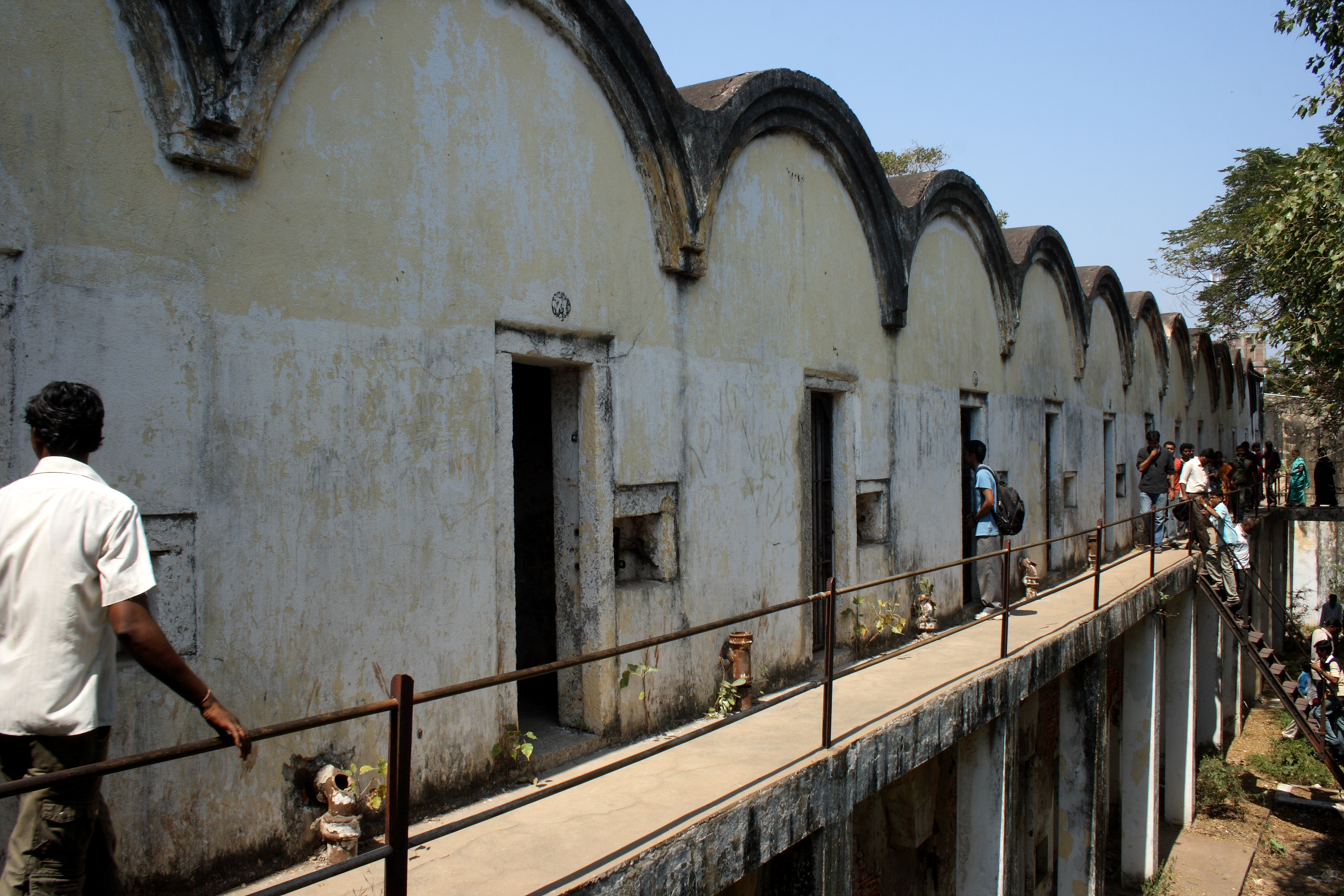
- A section of the Madras Central Prison before demolition in 2009
- Interactive map of Madras Central Prison
- Location: Chennai, Tamil Nadu, India; 13.07974°N 80.272915°E
- Status: Demolished
- Opened: 1837
- Closed: 2009

Madras Central Prison was one of the oldest prisons in India. It was located in Chennai (formerly Madras) in the Indian state of Tamil Nadu. It became operational during the British Raj period. The prisoners held there were moved to the newly constructed Puzhal Central Prison starting in 2006, with the 172-year-old prison being demolished in June 2009.

== History ==
Madras Central Prison was one of the oldest prisons in India. It was started during British rule in 1837. It was initially called the Madras penitentiary until 1855 when it was renamed to Central Jail. It was originally built to house transit convicts who were to face the 'sazay-e-kaala paani' in Cellular Jail in Andaman and Nicobar Islands and constructed at the cost of Rs 16,496 on 11 acres (45,000 m^{2}) of land.

It is said that the call for independence found its echo more in the Madras Presidency than elsewhere in the princely States. Many of those freedom fighters were arrested and lodged here; it is said a few of them died in custody.

There were 1,778 prisoners in the prison as of January 2002, of which 500 required to be produced in different courts in Chennai and mofussil (rural) areas including Tiruchi, Madurai, Coimbatore and Tirunelveli.

== Notable prisoners ==
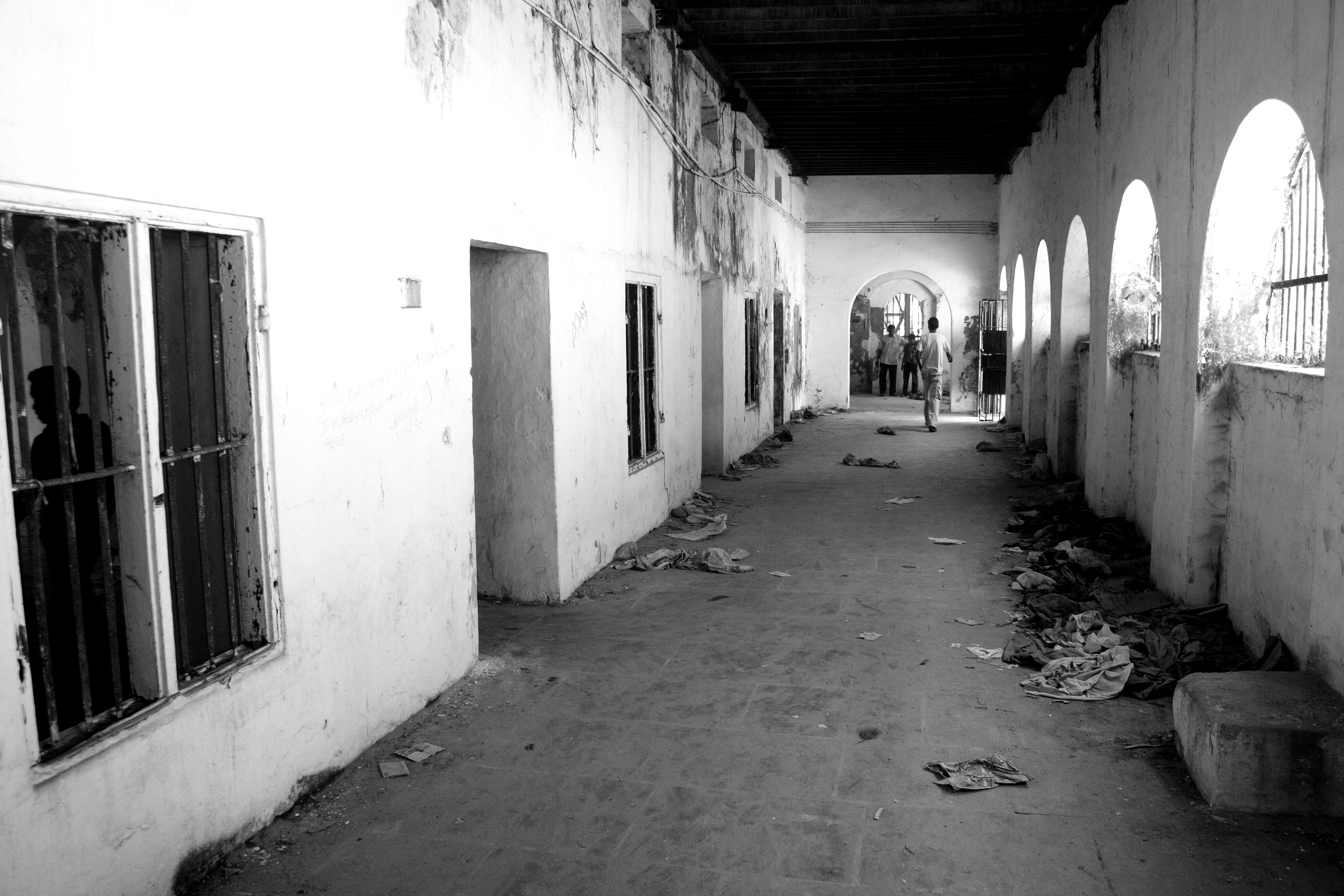
Abandoned corridors of the Madras Central Prison pictured in 2009

The prison housed Subhas Chandra Bose during the days of independence movement. C. N. Annadurai, former Chief Minister of Tamil Nadu and leader of Dravidian Movement was housed here for his Anti Hindi agitations. The prison also housed former Chief Minister of Tamil Nadu, M. Karunanidhi and chief minister of Tamil Nadu J. Jayalalithaa during the trial involving corruption cases. Also, several international figures, including LTTE chief Velupillai Prabhakaran, Maoist leader of Nepal, Chandra Prakash Gajurel were imprisoned here.

== 1999 riots ==
In 1999, some of the inmates rioted following the death of an inmate named Boxer Vadivelu. They set fire to a room where the assistant warden had taken refuge. Riot police were called in to contain the riots; the police initially used tear gas to quell the rioters, before resorting to live ammunition. In the battle which ensued between the inmates and the riot police, 10 people, including a prison official, were killed, while more than 100 people were injured.

== Relocation ==
The Madras Central prisoners were relocated to Puzhal Central Prison in Puzhal in 2006 and the vacant property was handed over to Chennai Metro Rail Limited (CMRL) for revenue augmentation purpose in 2008. The cost of the 13-acre (53,000 m^{2}) land was estimated conservatively at Rs. 4.75 billion. Demolition of the buildings began on 14 June 2009.

== New buildings for Madras Medical College ==
In 2010, a new campus with a six-storeyed building for Madras Medical College was built on a land covering 325,000 sq ft on the prison premises and was completed in 2012 at a cost of ₹ 566.3 million. The campus will have nearly 1,250 students and 400 faculty and staff members.

== See also ==
- Architecture of Chennai
- Heritage structures in Chennai
