= Vijay Award for Best Make Up Artistes =

Indian film award

The Vijay Award for Best Make Up is given by Star Vijay as part of its annual Vijay Awards ceremony for Tamil (Kollywood) films.

== The list ==
Here is a list of the award winners and the films for which they won.

Year	Technician	Film	Link
2017	Not Awarded		
2014	Pattanam Rasheed, Pattanam Sha, Siva, Promod	Kaaviya Thalaivan	
2013	Dasarathan	Paradesi	
2012	Sarath Kumar	Aravaan	
2011	Gothandapani	7aam Arivu	
2010	Banu	Endhiran	
2009	Sasi and Das	Naan Kadavul	
2008	Yogesh, Banu	Vaaranam Aayiram	
2007			
2006			

== Nominations ==
- 2008 Yogesh, Banu - Vaaranam Aayiram
  - Michael Westmore - Dasavathaaram
  - Shanmugam, Manohar - Poo
  - Vanitha Krishnamoorthy, Harinath - Bommalattam
- 2009 Sasi, Das - Naan Kadavul
  - Pattanam Raseed - Kanchivaram
  - Nellai Shanmugam - Kanthaswamy
  - S. A. Shanmugam - Naadodigal
  - Sasi - Pokkisham
- 2010 Banu - Endhiran
- 2011 Gothandapani - 7 Aum Arivu
  - Dasarathan - Avan Ivan
  - Vinoth Sukumaran - Aaranya Kaandam
  - K. P. Sasikumar - Vaagai Sooda Vaa
  - Vinod - Engeyum Eppodhum
- 2012 Sarath Kumar - Aravaan
- 2013 Dasarathan - Paradesi
  - Albert Chettiyar, Avinash, Bujji Babu, Ramachandran, Ramu & Shanmugam - Raja Rani
  - Gage Hubard & Ralis Khan - Vishwaroopam
  - Irma Dataushvali, Mohideen Kumar, Nicky Rajani, Ramachandran & Ratan Gupta - Irandam Ulagam
  - Ramesh Mohanty, Thomas Van Der Nest - Maryan
- 2014 Pattanam Rasheed, Pattanam Sha, Siva, Promod - Kaaviya Thalaivan
  - Gothandapani & Banu - Lingaa
  - Lalitha Rajamanikam, Mari Nagendra & Gopi - Yaamirukka Bayamey
  - Vinoth Sukumaran - Mundasupatti
  - Vinoth Sukumaran - Jigarthanda

== See also ==
- Tamil cinema
- Cinema of India
