= Vadivel =

Vadivel is a masculine given name. Notable people with the name include:

- Vadivel Balaji (1975–2020), Indian television personality and actor
- Vadivel Suresh, Sri Lankan politician

== See also ==
- Vadivelu
