= Banu (make-up artist) =

Indian makeup artist working in Tamil cinema

Banu Bashyam is an Indian make-up artist working in Tamil cinema.

== Life ==
After doing a beautician course in Mumbai, Banu Bashyam left for the United States to learn make-up at an institute owned by the Broadway make-up artist Bob Kelly. She later returned to India and became a make-up artist for advertisements. She went on to work in numerous high-profile films including Sivaji: The Boss (2007), Vaaranam Aayiram (2008) and Enthiran (2010).

== Awards ==
Ananda Vikatan Cinema Awards

- 2007: Best Makeup Artist – Sivaji: The Boss
- 2008: Best Makeup Artist – Dasavathaaram
- 2009: Best Makeup Artist – Ayan
- 2010: Best Makeup Artist – Enthiran
- 2011: Best Makeup Artist – 7 Aum Arivu
- 2018: Best Makeup Artist – 2.0
- 2019: Best Makeup Artist – Asuran

Vijay Awards

- 2008: Best Makeup Artist – Vaaranam Aayiram
- 2010: Best Makeup Artist – Enthiran
