= Boxer Vadivelu =

Indian gangster

Boxer Vadivelu was a fisherman and criminal from Power Kuppam, Kasimedu. He started by collecting extortion money from the markets at the Royapuram fishing harbour. Vadivelu then transported foreign liquor and goods from Kasimedu, Royapuram and Chennai harbours, and was also involved in smuggling, contract killing, and extortion. His gang attacked the office of the Tharasu magazine in 1991, killing its employees. He obtained the political patronage of All India Anna Dravida Munnetra Kazhagam, which was followed by a rivalry between him and gangster Ayodhya Kuppam Veeramani after this incident.

Vadivelu played a cameo part in the 1997 crime movie Omkaram, being arrested and sentenced to prison afterwards.

== Death ==
In November 1999 he died in Chennai Central Prison due to liver failure, which resulted in a riot.
