= Jama (film) =

Indian drama film

- Theatrical release poster
- Directed by: Pari Elavazhagan
- Written by: Pari Elavazhagan
- Produced by: Sai Devanand S; Sasikala S; Sai Venkateswaran S
- Starring: Pari Elavazhagan; Ammu Abhirami; Chetan
- Cinematography: Gopal Krishna
- Edited by: Partha M.A
- Music by: Ilaiyaraaja
- Production companies: SSBV Learn and Teach Production Private Limited
- Distributed by: Picture Box Company
- Release date: 2 August 2024
- Country: India
- Language: Tamil

Jama is a 2024 Indian Tamil-language drama film written and directed by Pari Elavazhagan in his directoral debut and the film stars himself, Ammu Abhirami and Chetan along with Sri Krishna Dayal, KVN Manimegalai, Vasant Marimuthu, Siva Maran, A. K. Elavazhagan and Kaala Kumar in supporting roles.

== Plot ==
In the village of Pallikondapattu, Tiruvannamalai, Kalyanam is a male actor who performs as female characters in the Therukoothu troupe, Ramachandran Nadaga Sabha (transl. Ramachandran Drama Association), led by Thandavam, a drunkard. Kalyanam's father, Elavarasan, originally founded the troupe. The troupe has 16 members, but Kalyanam is the only member who doesn't play male characters. Kalyanam's mother worries about his marriage prospects due to his feminine behavior as he socializes with village women, chatting and gossiping, and his consistent portrayal of the female lead character, Draupadi which earns him ridicule from the village youths. However, Kalyanam is uninterested in marriage, and his ambition is to lead the drama troupe that once belonged to his father. Kalyanam's mother pressures him to tell Thandavam that he will no longer portray female characters, or else he will leave the troupe. Thandavam was already incensed with Chandran leaving the troupe, so when Kalyanam, oblivious to the situation, requests a male lead role, Thandavam mocks Kalyanam, causing Kalyanam to break down in tears. But Thandavam convinces Kalyanam to continue with female roles, ensuring he stays in the troupe.

Ganesan aka Poonai, the senior member of the troupe, encourages Kalyanam to seek support from fellow members. However, they demand money or favors in exchange for their support but refuse to confront Thandavam. Thandavam's daughter, Jegathambiga "Jega", loves Kalyanam, but he doesn't reciprocate due to her being his teacher's daughter. Also Kalyanam feels inferior and hesitant to marry Jega, fearing public ridicule. However, Jega motivates him to be the "man" she loves. Kalyanam and his mother visit Thandavam's house to propose Jega's marriage to Kalyanam but, Thandavam humiliates and beats Kalyanam. Enraged, Jega leaves the house along with Kalyanam, but Kalyanam brings her back declaring that prefers to rejoin the troupe over Jega's love. Heartbroken, Jega returns to her studies, vowing never to come back. Kalyanam sells his mother's land, lying to his mother, saying he's selling the land for a government job. He the 4 lakh rupees obtained from the land sale to troupe members as advance, and books a program. However, no one shows up on the day of the program, as they refuse to work under Kalyanam due to his status. When Kalyanam's mother discovers the truth, she breaks down in nervous exhaustion and suddenly dies, grief-stricken.

Eleven years have passed since Elavarasan's death, and the Mottaparai village festival hasn't begun properly due to the spirits possessed not granting permission. Thandavam consistently prevents Kalyanam from participating in the ritual, while Poonai urges Kalyanam to take the spirit pot despite the villagers' resistance. In a series of flashbacks, Poonai reveals how Elavarasan learns acting, singing and theatre organization, becomes a great performer and brings traditional Theru Koothu to his village, with the whole village's involvement. Poonai, Elavarasan, and Thandavam start their own troupe, Ambalavanan Nadaga Sabha, sharing investments. Thandavam bonds his elder daughter to farm work for his share of the money, prompting Kalyanam to drop out of school and take up farm work to encourage Jega to pursue her studies. Jega uses her scholarship to rescue Kalyanam from bonded farm work, and soon Kalyanam joins Thandavam's troupe to fund Jega's education. Thandavam becomes infuriated when Jega doesn't give him the scholarship and when Kalyanam joins the troupe, Thandavam fearing that he'll be sidelined, plots to split the troupe. So, Thandavam with his relatives and a few villagers' support, gain permission to perform Elavarasan's Arjunan character in the Mottapaarai ritual, thereby, successfully driving Elavarasan out of the troupe. Elavarasan becomes addicted to alcohol and abandons street play, but Kalyanam is determined to reclaim his father's troupe. Elavarasan, overcome with depression and weakened from alcoholism, dances to death in the Mottapparai hills. Thandavam becomes the lead of the troupe and begins performing.

At the festival's commencement, the divine force possesses Kalyanam, granting permission for him to perform, angering Thandavam. Meanwhile, Kalyanam tries to reconcile with Jega, explaining that he stays in Thandavam's troupe only to perform, gather people, and eventually form a new troupe, but she rejects him, protesting that he never tried to get her back when it was clear that she loved him. In an argument with Thandavam, Kalyanam accuses Thandavam of betraying his father, which infuriates Thandavam who changes Kalyanam's character from Draupadi to a new role of Kunthi and takes the role of a relatively easy Karnan for himself. The play begins, depicting Karnan's defeat in the Kurukshetra War and Kunthi, played by Kalyanam, who has to lament over her son's death. Kalyanam's performance as Kunthi turns out to be extraordinary, leaving the audience and even Thandavam in awe. Overcome with regret for betraying Kalyanam's father and belittling him, Thandavam falls at Kalyanam's feet and dies. Two months later, Kalyanam dresses as Arjunan and begins to perform the ferocious portrayal of the character, fulfilling his mother's last wish, and astonishing the troupe members who rejected him earlier.

== Cast ==
- Pari Elavazhagan as Kalyanam
- Ammu Abhirami as Jegathambiga "Jega"
- Chetan as Thandavam
- Sri Krishna Dayal as Elavarasan
- Manimegalai as Kalyanam's mother
- Vasant Marimuthu as Ganesan "Poonai"
- Siva Maran as Maran
- A. K. Elavazhagan as Karuna
- Kaala Kumar

== Production ==
The film is a directorial debut for the director, Pari Elavazhagan. The film was shot in Thiruvannamalai. The film was produced by Sai Devanand S, Sasikala S and Sai Venkateswaran S under the banner of SSBV Learn and Teach Production Private Limited. The cinematography was done by Gopal Krishna while editing was handled by Partha M.A and music composed by Ilaiyaraaja.

== Release ==
The film was released on 2 August 2024 in theatres.

== Reception ==
Abhinav Subramanian of The Times of India gave it two-and-a-half out of five stars and wrote, "Jama, despite its narrative shortcomings, offers a genuine tribute to Theru Koothu and strives to revive a fading art form." Anusha Sundar of OTTplay gave it three out of five stars and wrote, "The film takes a heartfelt look into a drama troupe led by Pari Elavazhagan. The movie shows the conflicts and politics within the group, but it also has its limitations".
