= M. Prabhaharan =

Indian film art director, production designer and director

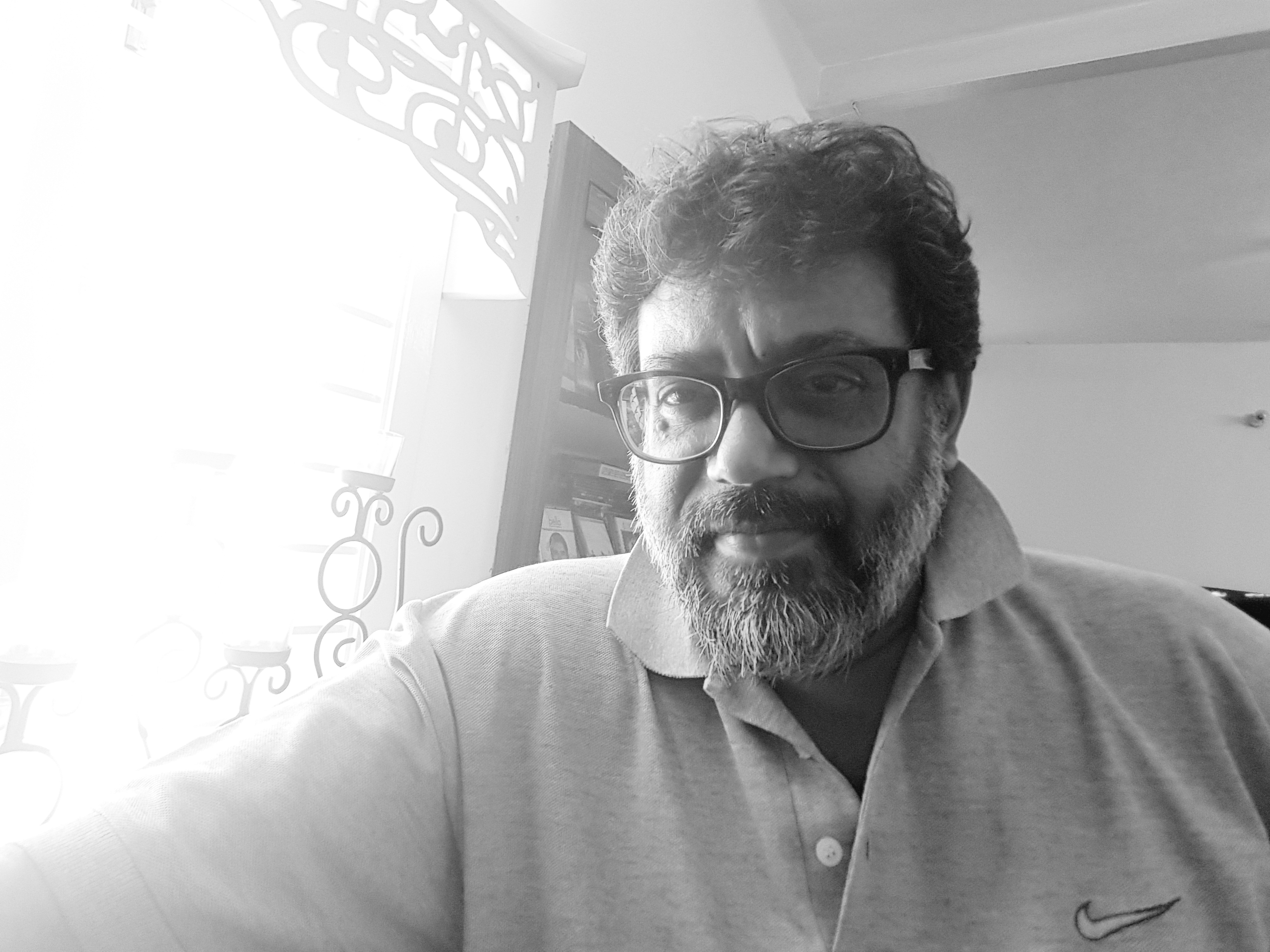
- M. Prabhaharan
- Born: 6 July 1966 (age 60); Kuchanur, Theni, India
- Occupations: Art director, production designer, Film Director

M. Prabhaharan is an Indian Film Art Director, Production Designer and Director who completed his degree course in Fine Arts at Government College of Fine Arts, Chennai. He had a brief stint as an illustrator in Special Effects Venky's office in 1990 and then worked as an assistant Art Director under the noted Art Director, Mr. Ashok Kumar in Tamil and Telugu film industry for a few years. He got a big break in 1995 when he was offered to do art direction for R. Parthiepan's movie Pulla Kuttikaran, for which he received the award for Best Art Direction from Tamil Nadu Govt. He did art direction for many Tamil movies, to name a few, Ullathai Allitha, Thullatha Manamum Thullum, Thirupaachi, Anbe Sivam, Virumaandi, Dasavathaaram, Majaa, Vishwa Thulasi, Tenaliraman and Bairavaa. He is currently working on Swayambhu, an Indian Telugu-language epic action drama film.

== Awards ==
- 1995 - Tamil Nadu Govt. State Award for Pullakuttikaran
- 1996 - Ajantha Award for Sundara Purushan
- 1997 - Priya Cultural Academy Award for V.I.P
- 2001 - Tamil Nadu Govt. State Award for Poovellam Un Vasam
- 2001 - Pace Award for Poovellam Un Vasam
- 2001 - Variety Award for Poovellam Un Vasam
- 2002 - Sica Awards for Anbe Sivam
- 2002 - Medimix Dinakaran Award for Anbe Sivam
- 2002 - V. Shantaram Award for Anbe Sivam
- 2008 - Vikatan Award for Dasavathaaram
- 2008 - Vijay Award for Dasavathaaram
- 2015 - Tamil Nadu Govt. State Award for Pasanga 2

== Filmography ==
Year	Movie	Language
1995	Pullakuttikaran	Tamil
1995	Ullathai Allitha	Tamil
1996	Panchalankurichi	Tamil
1996	Sundara Purushan	Tamil
1997	Boopathi	Malayalam
1997	V.I.P	Tamil
1998	Ninaithen Vandhai	Tamil
1998	Thullatha Manamum Thullum	Tamil
1998	Chhota Chetan	Hindi
2000	Pennin Manathai Thottu	Tamil
2000	Maayi	Tamil
2000	Dumm Dumm Dumm	Tamil
2001	Poovellam Un Vasam	Tamil
2001	Shahjahan	Tamil
2002	Arputham	Tamil
2002	Raja	Tamil
2003	Anbe Sivam	Tamil
2003	Thithikudhe	Tamil
2003	Arasu	Tamil
2004	Virumaandi	Tamil
2004	Udhaya	Tamil
2004	White Rainbow	English
2004	Shwet	Hindi
2004	Vishwa Thulasi	Tamil
2004	Thirupaachi	Tamil
2005	Majaa	Tamil
2005	Kalvanin Kadhali	Tamil
2006	Kannum Kannum	Tamil
2007	Dasavathaaram	Tamil
2008	Velli Thirai	Tamil
2009	Silambattam	Tamil
2009	Kutty	Tamil
2009	Mayandi Kudumbathar	Tamil
2010	Aasal	Tamil
2011	Uthama Puthiran	Tamil
2012	Mayilu	Tamil
2013	Alex Pandian	Tamil
2014	Tenaliraman	Tamil
2014	Mosakutty	Tamil
2015	Nannbenda	Tamil
2015	Pasanga 2	Tamil
2016	Meen Kuzhambum Mann Paanaiyum	Tamil
2017	Bairavaa	Tamil
2017	Neruppu Da	Tamil
2017	Aayirathil Iruvar	Tamil
2018	Jagajaalaa Killadi	Tamil
2019	Sangathamizhan	Tamil
2024	Swayambhu	Telugu

== Non-credited films ==
Year	Movie	Language
1997	Chachi 420	Hindi
1998	Mere Sapno Ki Rani	Hindi
1999	Pukar	Hindi
2004	Pithamagan	Tamil
2014	Veeram	Tamil

== Director/ Producer ==
Year	Movie	Language	Notes
2011	Amma	Tamil	Directed and Produced by M. Prabhaharan, (John Pennycuick Productions)
