= Rekha Vedavyas =

Indian actress

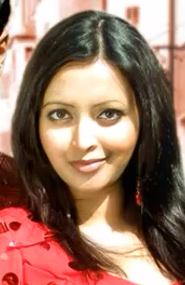
- Rekha Vedavyas in 2011 Kannada film Boss
- Born: Rekha Vedavyas; Bangalore, Karnataka, India
- Other names: Akshara, Jinke Mari Rekha
- Occupations: Actress, model
- Years active: 2001-2024

Rekha Vedavyas, also known as Akshara, is a former Indian actress, who predominantly acts in Kannada films and also appears in Telugu and Tamil films. While pursuing modelling, she made her acting debut in the 2001 Kannada film Chitra and has since starred in over 30 films in various South Indian languages.

== Career ==
Rekha was born and brought up in Bangalore, Karnataka. She did her schooling at the Basava Residential Girls School in Kengeri, Bangalore. She was doing her BBA correspondence course from the University of Madras, while modelling part-time and trying to pursue an acting career. She was eventually signed by Jayashree Devi for the Ramoji Rao-produced college drama Chitra, in which she played a NRI student. Her first film to release was the blockbuster Huchcha, alongside Sudeep and she made her debut in Telugu cinema with Sreenu Vaitla's Anandam. All three ventures were commercially successful. She starred in Sabapathy's love triangle-based film Punnagai Poove. 2003 she also had her first and till date only Hindi release, Mudda with Arya Babbar and was seen in a supporting role in the female-oriented Three Roses that featured Rambha, Jyothika and Laila in the lead. She was paired with Ganesh in his first feature film appearance in Chellata as well as in Hudugaata the next year, both emerging commercial successes. After her subsequent releases that year bombed at the box office, she starred in the bilingual Ninna Nedu Repu / Netru Indru Naalai and in Ramesh Arvind's directorial Accident, which became critically acclaimed, while making special appearances in the films Mast Maja Maadi, Raaj The Showman and Yogi. In 2010, she had a single release, Appu and Pappu, while her most recent release was Boss, paired with Darshan again. She worked on projects such as Prema Chandrama, Jolly Boy alongside Diganth, directed by Sabapathy again, and Thulasi.

== Filmography ==
Year	Film	Role	Language	Notes
2001	Huchcha	Abishtha	Kannada	
2001	Chitra	Chitra	Kannada	credited as Chitra
2001	Anandam	Aishwarya	Telugu	
2001	Jabili	Lavanya	Telugu	
2002	Thuntata	Aishwarya	Kannada	
2002	Okato Number Kurraadu	Swapna	Telugu	
2002	Manmadhudu	Shiva's wife	Telugu	Special appearance
2003	Punnagai Poove	Meera	Tamil	
2003	Dongodu	Prabha	Telugu	
2003	Anaganaga O Kurraadu	Rekha Naidu	Telugu	
2003	Janaki Weds Sriram	Anjali	Telugu	
2003	Three Roses	Asha	Tamil	
2003	Mudda – The Issue	Sundari	Hindi	
2004	Preminchukunnam Pelliki Randi	Swapna	Telugu	
2004	Monalisa	Herself	Kannada	Special appearance in song "Car Car"
2005	Sye		Kannada	
2006	Chellata	Ankitha	Kannada	
2006	Naayudamma		Telugu	
2006	Nenjirukkum Varai		Tamil	Special appearance
2007	Hudugaata	Priya Rao	Kannada	
2007	Thamshegaagi	Rekha	Kannada	
2007	Hethre Hennanne Herabeku	Jyothi	Kannada	
2007	Gunavantha	Uma	Kannada	
2008	Accident	Vasundhara	Kannada	
2008	Ninna Nedu Repu	Swapna	Telugu	Credited as Akshara
2008	Netru Indru Naalai	Swapna	Tamil	Credited as Akshara
2008	Mast Maja Maadi		Kannada	Special appearance
2009	Raaj the Showman		Kannada	Special appearance
2009	Yogi		Kannada	Special appearance
2009	Parichaya	Nimmi	Kannada	
2010	Appu and Pappu	Deepa Ramesh	Kannada	
2011	Boss		Kannada	
2011	Prema Chandrama	Chethana	Kannada	
2011	Jolly Boy	Indusri	Kannada	
2012	Govindaya Namaha	Sheela	Kannada	
2012	Genius		Telugu	Special appearance
2013	Benki Birugali	Rekha	Kannada	
2013	Loosegalu	Maggie	Kannada	
2014	Paramashiva		Kannada	
2014	Pulakeshi		Kannada	
2014	Thulasi		Kannada	
2023	Ala Ila Ela		Telugu	
2024	Oru Thee		Tamil	Direct release on Thanthi One
