= Pathinaaru =

- Theatrical release poster
- Directed by: Sabapathy Dekshinamurthy
- Written by: R. K. Mahalingam (dialogue)
- Screenplay by: Sabapathy Dekshinamurthy
- Story by: Sabapathy Dekshinamurthy
- Produced by: A. Sivasankar
- Starring: Shiva; Madhu Shalini
- Cinematography: Aruldoss
- Edited by: G. Rama Rao
- Music by: Yuvan Shankar Raja
- Production company: Passion Movie Makers
- Distributed by: V. Creations
- Release date: 28 January 2011
- Running time: 106 minutes
- Country: India
- Language: Tamil

Pathinaaru (transl. Sixteen) is a 2011 Indian Tamil-language romantic drama film written and directed by Sabapathy Dekshinamurthy. It stars Shiva and Madhu Shalini. The film's background score and soundtrack was composed by Yuvan Shankar Raja. Though production began in October 2008 under the title 16, the film languished in production hell, and was complete only by early 2010. A year later, Kalaipuli S. Thanu bought the distribution rights and released the film on 28 January 2011 under his V. Creations banner. It was remade in Kannada the same year as Jolly Boy by the same director.

== Plot ==
Shiva and Indhu are college students who both fall in love with each other. However, Indhu's father Gopalakrishnan and mother oppose their love as they do not trust love and try to convince Indhu for which she does not agree. One day, Indhu's mother gives a book titled "Pathinaru" and asks Shiva and Indhu to read so that they might change their opinions about love.

Now the story moves back to a village in 1980s which describes a teenage love between Gopi (Kishore Kumar) and Ilavarasi (Vinitha). Gopi is from a poor family, while Ilavarasi is from an affluent family in the same village. When her parents find out about their love, they try all means to separate them. Finally, Gopi and Ilavarasi decide to run away from the village, but they are caught by their parents.

Ilavarasi goes to the extent of abandoning her family and wealth for the sake of Gopi. She asks Gopi in front of villagers to buy her a saree with his income, so that she can wear that and leave the village as she does not want any of her ancestral wealth and she waits for Gopi's arrival. Gopi goes to a nearby town to earn some money so that he can buy her a saree, but he meets with an accident and goes unconscious. Gopi is saved by a lorry driver and is admitted in a hospital. He recovers after a few months and returns to the village to meet Ilavarasi, but is shocked to know that her wedding is on the same day with someone. Gopi is shocked and leaves the village with sorrows.

The book ends there, and Indhu's mother reveals that Gopi is none other than Indhu's father Gopalakrishnan. She also convinces Indhu that Gopi transformed into Gopalakrishnan, which made him successful in life rather than keep worrying about his failed love. Now, Indhu doubts the credibility of love and decides to accept her parents' words.

But Shiva tries to find the whereabouts of Ilavarasi and leaves to the village. After meeting many people, Shiva finds the place where Ilavarasi is currently and goes to meet her. He also takes Gopalakrishnan with him. Gopalakrishnan is shocked to see Ilavarasi, who now runs an orphanage in the memory of Gopi. Gopalakrishnan gets to know that Ilavarasi did not agree for the wedding and came away from her family and till the time she lives with memory of Gopi. Gopalakrishnan feels guilty but understands the power of true love and decides to get Shiva and Indhu married.

== Cast ==
- Shiva as Shiva
- Madhu Shalini as Indhu Gopalakrishnan
- Abhishek as Gopalakrishnan
  - Kishore Kumar as teenage Gopalakrishnan
  - Master Sanjay as young Gopalakrishnan
- Kasthuri as Ilavarasi (cameo appearance)
  - Vinitha as teenage Ilavarasi
  - Baby Pooja as young Ilavarasi
- Pandi as Sakkarai
- Amirtha as Indhu's mother
- Darbuka Siva as Shiva's friend
- Aruldoss as a police officer

== Production ==
Radio jockey-turned-actor Shiva, who rose to fame through his appearances in Chennai 600028 (2007) and Saroja (2008), revealed that he had signed this film, when it was titled 16, right after Chennai 600028. Though production began in 2008, the film mired in production hell and was complete only by January 2010. Despite this, the film's release still got delayed further, until a year later when noted film producer and distributor Kalaipuli S. Thanu, after watching a preview screening of the film, decided to take over the film's theatrical rights and distribute it under his V. Creations banner all over Tamil Nadu.

== Soundtrack ==
The film score and soundtrack of Pathinaaru were composed by Shiva's friend Yuvan Shankar Raja, collaborating with Sabapathy again after Punnagai Poove in 2003. Notably, Yuvan worked for this film without charging any remuneration. For a song in the flashback portion of the film, Yuvan made his brother Karthik Raja sing, which is the first solo song of him under Yuvan's composition. The soundtrack album was released on 24 December 2010. Prior and during the time of the film's audio launch, Yuvan was featured on the film posters, by which the producer promoted the film and the album.

MusicAloud called the album a "Decent closure to a relatively low-key year for Yuvan Shankar Raja", rating it 7.5 out of 10. Pavithra Srinivasan from Rediff.com called the album "'worth a listen", adding that Pathinaaru "might have plenty of Yuvan's signature tunes, but there are moments of appeal that give some depth to the album, and veer away from his template". In regards to the score, she wrote that it "fits the film and adds some depth to it." The Times of India critic N. Venkateswaran noted that Yuvan was "in superb form in this romantic album both as composer and singer". 600024.com also gave a positive review. Karthik of Milliblog wrote, "Listenable, but the repetitive sound that we celebrate as Yuvan's trademark is starting to get tedious now". The tunes were retained in the film's Kannada remake Jolly Boy (2011).

Track listing
No.	Title	Lyrics	Singer(s)	Length
1.	"Adada En Meethu"	Karthik Netha	Hariharan, Bela Shende	4:21
2.	"Yaar Solli Kadhal"	Snehan	Yuvan Shankar Raja	6:36
3.	"Kaattu Chedikku"	Snehan	Karthik Raja	4:30
4.	"Vaanam Namadhe"	Snehan	Shankar Mahadevan	5:08
5.	"Theme Music" (instrumental)	—	—	2:23
Total length:				22:58

== Reception ==
Pavithra Srinivasan of Rediff.com wrote, "16 starts off on the right note and sentiments, but doesn't quite capitalise on its characters or story". N. Venkateswaran of The Times of India wrote, "The director's conscious decision not to preach to youngsters, who are [his target] audience, is a welcome one. But the message would have reached home better if he had delivered it in a short and sweet manner". Sify wrote, "The only silver lining in the film is Yuvan Shankar Raja's music. The film does not have storyline strong enough to hold viewers interest post interval and it looked like Sabapathy was in a hurry to end it".
