= Kalaipuli S. Thanu =

Indian film producer and distributor (born 1952)

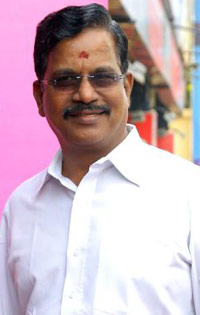
- Born: 25 June 1958 (age 68); North Arcot, Tamil Nadu, India
- Occupations: Producer; distributor; director
- Years active: 1985–present
- Spouse: Kala
- Children: 3
- Honours: Kalaimamani 2020

Kalaipuli S. Thanu (pronounced [ðaːnu]) is an Indian film producer and distributor, known for his films in Tamil cinema. He has produced several films through his two companies, V Creations and Kalaipuli Films International. Many of his films have been commercially successful, three of which are among the top-ten highest grossing Tamil films. He has won two National Film Awards, two Cinema Express Awards and one Filmfare Awards South.

== Personal life ==
Thanu is married to Kala. Their son Kalaprabhu made his directorial debut with Sakkarakatti (2008). Thanu also has a daughter Kavitha.

== Career ==
S. Thanu began his career as a film financier and distributor, before becoming a producer and a partner at Kalaipuli Films with S. Thanu and Soori with Yaar? (1985), being their debut film as producers. He initially started as a publicity designer being responsible for christening Rajinikanth as "Superstar" and creating a 35 feet cutout of him in a theatre. He started his own company V. Creations and went on to produce commercially successful films with Vijayakanth in Cooliekkaran (1987), Nallavan (1988) and Pudhu Padagan (1990). His Vanna Vanna Pookkal (1992) directed by Balu Mahendra won the National Film Award for Best Feature Film in Tamil. He also did in a cameo appearance for a film Magalir Mattum in 1994. Kizhakku Cheemayile (1993) and Kandukondain Kandukondain (2000) won the Cinema Express Award for Best Film – Tamil. He has also produced films with Suriya in Kaakha Kaakha (2003), Maayavi (2005) and with Vijay in Sachein (2005), Thuppakki (2012) and Theri (2016). He collaborated with Rajinikanth for the first time for Kabali (2016).

He has produced four films for Dhanush such as Velaiilla Pattadhari 2 (2017), Asuran (2019), Karnan (2021) and Naane Varuvean (2022).

== Companies ==
Thanu owns Kalaipuli Films and V Creations. The former company was registered as a private company on 8 March 2004, and the CEO of the latter is Thanu's other son Paranthaman.

== Filmography ==
=== As actor ===
Year	Film	Role
1994	Magalir Mattum	Thamizhavan

=== As producer ===
Year	Film	Director(s)	Notes	Ref.
1985	Yaar?	Sakthi-Kannan		
1987	Cooliekkaran	Rajasekhar		
1988	Nallavan	S. P. Muthuraman		
1990	Pudhu Padagan	S. Thanu	Also director, writer and music composer	
1991	Thaiyalkaran	S. P. Muthuraman		
1992	Vanna Vanna Pookkal	Balu Mahendra		
1993	Kizhakku Cheemayile	Bharathiraja		
1997	V. I. P.	Sabapathy Dekshinamurthy		
1999	Mannavaru Chinnavaru	P. N. Ramachandra Rao		
1999	Mugam	Gnana Rajasekaran		
2000	Kandukondain Kandukondain	Rajiv Menon		
2001	Aalavandhan	Suresh Krissna		
2003	Punnagai Poove	Sabapathy Dekshinamurthy		
2003	Kaakha Kaakha	Gautham Vasudev Menon		
2005	Maayavi	Singampuli		
2005	Sachein	John Mahendran		
2005	Thotti Jaya	V. Z. Durai		
2006	Chennai Kadhal	Vikraman		
2007	Thirumagan	M. Rathnakumar		
2008	Sakkarakatti	Kala Prabhu		
2009	Kanthaswamy	Susi Ganesan		
2012	Thuppakki	AR Murugadoss		
2014	Arima Nambi	Anand Shankar		
2016	Kanithan	T. N. Santosh		
2016	Theri	Atlee Kumar		
2016	Kabali	Pa. Ranjith		
2017	Velaiilla Pattadhari 2	Soundarya Rajinikanth		
2017	Indrajith	Kala Prabhu		
2018	Sketch	Vijay Chandar		
2018	60 Vayadu Maaniram	Radha Mohan		
2018	Thuppakki Munai	Dinesh Selvaraj		
2019	Hippi	Krishna	Telugu film	
2019	Asuran	Vetrimaaran		
2021	Karnan	Mari Selvaraj		
2021	Naarappa	Srikanth Addala	Telugu film	
2022	Naane Varuvean	Selvaraghavan		
2024	Max	Vijay Karthikeyaa	Kannada film	
2026	Train †	Mysskin		
TBA	Arasan †	Vetrimaaran		

=== As distributor ===
- 1996 - Delhi Diary (Tamil dubbed)
- 1996 - Siraichaalai (Tamil dubbed)
- 2004 - Gharshana (Telugu)
- 2010 - Milaga
- 2010 - Thottupaar
- 2011 - Pathinaaru
- 2011 - Maaveeran (Tamil dubbed)
- 2011 - Urumi
- 2014 - Ner Ethir
- 2014 - Yennamo Yedho
- 2015 - Thakka Thakka
- 2015 - Vellaiya Irukiravan Poi Solla Maatan
- 2016 - Meendum Oru Kadhal Kadhai
- 2016 - Parandhu Sella Vaa
- 2017 - Velaiilla Pattadhari 2
- 2019 - Lucifer (Tamil dubbed)
- 2019 - Kurukshetra (Tamil dubbed)
- 2021 - Maraikayar: Arabikadalin Singam (Tamil version)
- 2022 - Andhagan
- 2022 - Iravin Nizhal

== Awards and honours ==
National Film Awards

- Won, Best Feature Film in Tamil for Vanna Vanna Pookkal (1992)
- Won, Best Feature Film in Tamil for Asuran (2019)

Cinema Express Awards

- Won, Best Film for Kizhakku Cheemayile (1993)
- Won, Best Film for Kandukondain Kandukondain (2000)

Filmfare Awards South

- Won, Best Film for Kandukondain Kandukondain (2000)
- Nominated, Best Film for Kaakha Kaakha (2003)
- Nominated, Best Film for Thuppakki (2012)
- Nominated, Best Film for Theri (2016)
- Nominated, Best Film for Kabali (2016)
- Nominated, Best Film for Karnan (2021)

South Indian International Movie Awards

- Nominated, Best Film for Thuppakki (2012)
- Nominated, Best Film for Theri (2016)
- Nominated, Best Film for Asuran (2019)
- Nominated, Best Film for Karnan (2021)

Vijay Awards

- Won, Favourite Film for Thuppakki (2012)

Edison Awards

- Won, Best Film for Kabali (2016)

Ananda Vikatan Cinema Awards

- Won, Most Popular Movie for Kabali (2016)

IIFA Utsavam

- Nominated, Best Film for Kabali (2016)

Norway Tamil Film Festival Awards

- Won, Best Film for Asuran (2019)
