= Anbe Sivam =

2003 Indian Tamil-language comedy-drama film by Sundar C

- Theatrical release poster
- Directed by: Sundar C
- Written by: Kamal Haasan
- Produced by: K. Muralitharan; V. Swaminathan; G. Venugopal
- Starring: Kamal Haasan; Madhavan; Kiran Rathod
- Cinematography: Arthur A. Wilson
- Edited by: P. Sai Suresh
- Music by: Vidyasagar
- Production company: Lakshmi Movie Makers
- Distributed by: Lakshmi Movie Makers
- Release date: 15 January 2003
- Running time: 160 minutes
- Country: India
- Language: Tamil
- Budget: ₹120 million (Note: The average exchange rate in 2003 was 45.66 Indian rupees (₹) per 1 US dollar (US$).)

Anbe Sivam (transl. Love Is God) is a 2003 Indian Tamil-language slice-of-life drama film directed by Sundar C and produced by Lakshmi Movie Makers. The film was written by Kamal Haasan, and Madhan provided the dialogues. Anbe Sivam stars Haasan, Madhavan and Kiran Rathod, with Nassar, Santhana Bharathi, Seema and Uma Riyaz Khan playing supporting characters. It tells the story of Nallasivam and Anbarasu, two men of contrasting personalities who undertake an unexpected journey from Bhubaneswar to Chennai.

Produced on a budget of ₹120 million, Anbe Sivam takes on themes such as communism, atheism, and altruism and depicts Haasan's humanist views. The music was composed by Vidyasagar. Arthur A. Wilson served as the cinematographer and M. Prabhaharan served as the art director.

The film was released on 15 January 2003 to positive reviews from critics but underperformed at the box office. Despite its initial failure, it has gained recognition over the years through re-runs on television channels and is now regarded as a classic of Tamil cinema and a cult film. It was screened as part of the Indian Panorama section of the International Film Festival of India in 2003. At the 51st Filmfare Awards South, it received a Special Jury Award and nominations in the Best Film and Best Actor (Haasan) categories. Madhavan was awarded Best Actor at the 2003 Tamil Nadu State Film Awards. Anbe Sivam was selected as one of the 25 best Indian movies of the 21st century by The Hollywood Reporter India.

== Plot ==
Anbarasu, an arrogant advertisement director going by the abbreviated name "A. Aras", and Nallasivam aka Sivam, a physically deformed social activist, meet at Biju Patnaik Airport in Bhubaneswar while waiting for a flight to Chennai. Following news reports of a terrorist threat, Aras mistakenly suspects Sivam of being a terrorist and reports him to the authorities. Soon after he realizes his error, heavy rainfall causes total flight cancellations and floods the city, leaving Aras with no choice but to share a hotel room with Sivam for the night. Both Aras and Sivam are desperate to reach Chennai: the former has to attend his upcoming wedding, and Sivam has to deliver a ₹32 lakh compensation to a group of union workers.

The following morning, with all the flights suspended, the two men board a bus to catch the Coromandel Express train. En route, Aras's bag is stolen, leaving him without cash and an unusable credit card. Sivam repeatedly uses his wit to assist Aras, even as the latter continuously attempts to distance himself from Sivam. While waiting for the train at Ichchapuram railway station in Andhra Pradesh, Sivam unveils his past to Aras.

In a flashback, Sivam works as a street theatre performer in Chennai, using his talent to protest against corporate exploitation and fight for labor rights. He frequently targets Kandasamy Padayatchi, a ruthless factory owner who refuses to pay his workers fair wages. Despite the rivalry, Sivam falls in love with Padayatchi's daughter, Balasaraswathi aka Bala. To avoid Padayatchi's interference, Sivam and Bala plan to elope to Kerala. However, the bus they board meets with a severe accident on a hillside, leaving him disfigured and partially paralyzed. He is later informed by Padayatchi that Bala is married, pregnant, and living abroad. Deeply moved by the compassion he experienced from the hospital staff during his recovery, Sivam embraces a philosophy centered on love and human kindness and returns to social work and activism with renewed determination.

Back in the present, the two arrive in Chennai, where Aras delivers Sivam's cheque to the union workers. Grateful for Sivam's help, Aras invites him to his wedding. Upon arriving at the venue, Sivam is stunned to discover that Aras's bride is Bala, who believes Sivam died in the accident. Noticing Sivam at the wedding, Padayatchi demands to know his intentions. Sivam assures Padayatchi that he has no desire to disrupt Bala's wedding, but uses the situation to blackmail Padayatchi into signing an agreement granting his employees rise in their wages.

Afterwards, Padayatchi secretly instructs his henchman to murder Sivam. As the henchman prepares to carry out the order, he experiences a change of heart, believing that his past misdeeds led to the loss of his own daughter. Instead of killing Sivam, the henchman urges him to leave and stay away from Padayatchi and his family. He agrees and walks away peacefully.

== Cast ==
- Kamal Haasan as Nallasivam
- Madhavan as Anbarasu
- Kiran Rathod as Balasaraswathi
- Nassar as Kandasamy Padayatchi
- Santhana Bharathi as Padayatchi's assistant
- Seema as Balasaraswathi's aunt
- Yugi Sethu as Uthaman
- R. S. Shivaji as the Ichchapuram railway station master
- Vishwanath as Padayatchi's assistant
- Balu Anand as T. Balaji, the train ticket checker for the Coromandel Express
- Ilavarasu as a police inspector and aide of Padayatchi
- Muthukaalai as a roadside drunkard
- Uma Riyaz Khan as Mehrunissa
- Pasi Sathya as a tea stall owner
- Ramu as a street theatre performer
- Chelladurai as a villager
- Nellai Siva as a villager
- Benjamin as a villager

Uncredited

- Poovilangu Mohan as a grieving father
- Kalairani as a grieving mother
- Krishnamoorthy as a union worker
- Kovai Senthil as a villager
- Madhan as himself
- Sujatha Narayanan as a tea shop owner who helps Nallasivam
- Vasanthi as a street theatre performer

== Production ==
=== Development ===
In the late 1990s, Kamal Haasan narrated the premise of a film to the director K. S. Ravikumar as they sought to collaborate following Avvai Shanmugi (1996). The initial script followed two men who meet in a train, quarrel, become friends and ultimately, one of them sacrifices everything for the other man. One individual was a Sri Lankan Tamil communist, while the other was a person who followed a right-wing political belief. Haasan had wanted to act in the film alongside Mohanlal, but Ravikumar refused the opportunity, saying it was not his usual film genre of expertise. Haasan and Ravikumar instead moved on to work on a different project titled Thenali (2000) and chose to make the film's title character a Sri Lankan Tamil as discussed in the earlier script.

After completing the draft for the film's script with alterations in early 2002, Haasan approached the Malayalam filmmaker Priyadarshan to direct it. The two men were keen to work together since the late 1990s, and upon reading the script, Priyadarshan believed that it had the potential to be an "emotional love story". The film's title Anbe Sivam was derived from the Shaivite saint Tirumular's poem Tirumantiram. In June 2002, Priyadarshan opted out of the project owing to creative differences. Sundar C came in as a replacement to work on the film. Anbe Sivam was co-produced and distributed by V. Swaminathan, K. Muralitharan and G. Venugopal under the production banner of Lakshmi Movie Makers.

=== Cast and crew ===
In addition to being the film's writer, Haasan also played the central character, Nallasivam. Madhavan was selected to play Anbarasu in January 2002. According to Kiran Rathod, she received a phone call from Haasan's office informing her that she was offered the role of Balasaraswathi, which she accepted. Rathod's voice in the film was dubbed by the singer Anuradha Sriram. Uma Riyaz Khan played the role of Nallasivam's friend and professional colleague, Mehrunissa. In a 2019 interview with The Indian Express, the film's script assistant and costume designer, Sujatha Narayanan, revealed that Nandita Das and Shobana were the original choices for Balasaraswathi and Mehrunissa respectively and that both of them declined due to schedule conflicts.

He [Kamal] came over to me and said, 'Madhavan, I have seen some of your work and they were good.' [...] Then he continued, 'I have something for you. We should catch up!' [...] that was how Anbe Sivam happened.

— Madhavan on how he was cast in Anbe Sivam

The actors Nassar and Santhana Bharathi played the roles of Kandasamy Padaiyatchi and his assistant, respectively, while cartoonist Madhan featured in a cameo appearance as himself in addition to writing the film's dialogues. Screenwriter Crazy Mohan also collaborated with Haasan on writing some dialogues for the film. In an interview with S. R. Ashok Kumar of The Hindu in 2006, Bharathi considered both Anbe Sivam and Michael Madana Kama Rajan (1990) to be the favourite roles of his career.

Arthur A. Wilson, M. Prabhaharan and P. Sai Suresh handled the film's cinematography, art direction and editing, respectively. Brinda, Chinni Prakash and Dinesh were in charge of the choreography while the stunt sequences were co-ordinated by Vikram Dharma. Muthulakshmi Varadhan, Bharathi's sister-in-law, worked as an assistant editor in the film. The make-up for Haasan's scars was designed by Michael Westmore and Anil Pemgirkar. In May 2002, Haasan completed the makeup for his character Nallasivam in Los Angeles after filming the song sequences for Panchatanthiram (2002).

=== Filming ===
Principal photography for Anbe Sivam commenced in July 2002. The first scene featuring the lead actors was shot at Pollachi Junction railway station. Haasan and Madhavan interacted closely during the initial stages of the shoot to ensure that the on-screen chemistry between the pair was apparent.

Anbe Sivam was shot on a restricted budget of ₹120 million, with the train and bus disaster sequences involving the use of settings and CGI. Madhavan, who began shooting his portions in September 2002, stated the film was shot in relatively empty locations. The flood scenes set in Odisha were re-created with outdoor sets consisting of city roads submerged under water erected in the Odisha-Andhra Pradesh border. Filming also took place in Chennai, Visakhapatnam and on the Tamil Nadu-Karnataka border. For a brief sequence in the "Naatukkoru Seithi" song, Haasan learnt how to play the thavil, a barrel-shaped percussion instrument, over three weeks. The pre-climax scenes were filmed in what was then known as the Campa Cola compound in Guindy. The climax scenes were filmed in a single take.

== Themes and influences ==
Anbe Sivam follows the events of a journey from Bhubaneswar to Chennai undertaken by two men of contrasting personalities: Nallasivam, a physically challenged and witty socialist, and Anbarasu, a commercial director who supports capitalism and globalisation. Due to unforeseen circumstances, the two are forced to undertake the journey together. Throughout the narrative, a series of themes pertaining to communism, (Note: Nalla and Aras argue about the topics at the Ichchapuram railway station.) compassion, globalisation, atheism, and altruism (Note: Aras donates blood to save a boy injured in a train accident from dying.) are addressed; the film also showcases Haasan's views as a humanist. According to Haasan, the characterisation of Nallasivam was inspired by the life of Communist playwright, actor, director, lyricist and theorist Safdar Hashmi, who was chiefly associated with his work on street theatre in India. Hashmi died on 2 January 1989 after being attacked by members of the Indian National Congress while staging a play, Halla Bol. S. Anand of Outlook magazine notes that Haasan's views on humanism in the film also seemed to be inspired by those of Charlie Chaplin. M. Kalyanaraman and Abdullah Nurullah of The Times of India opined that Nallasivam shared similar characteristics with street theatre artist Pralayan. According to Kalyanaraman, Anbe Sivam proposes that man can make morally superior choices when he comes face to face with death. As a result, Haasan indicates that the belief of "Siva is love" is the "final stage of evolution of man into God".

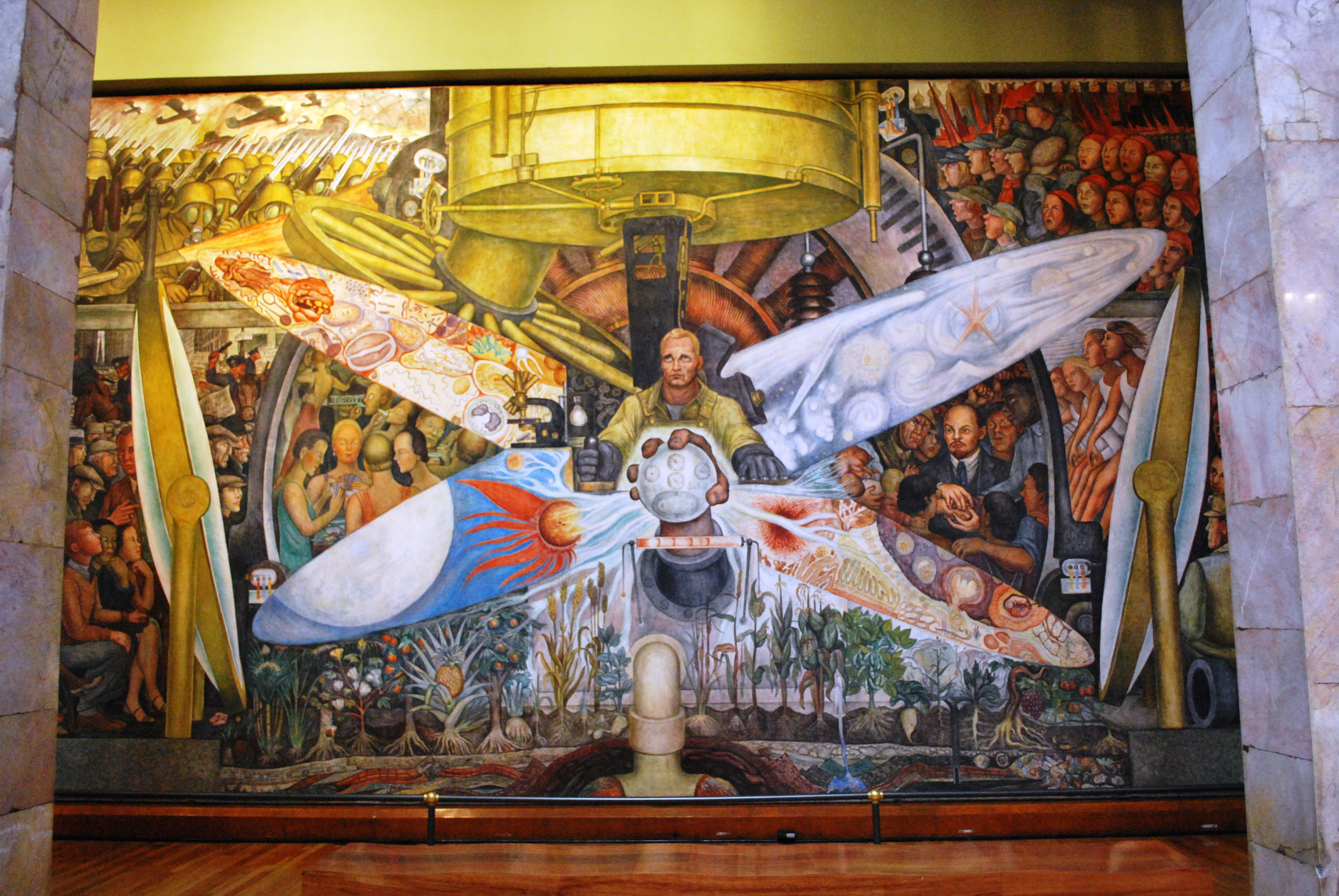
Mexican painter Diego Rivera's fresco, Man at the Crossroads served as an inspiration for Nallasivam's painting to indicate the atrocities committed by Kandasamy Padayatchi.

The film critic Baradwaj Rangan, in his review of another Haasan film, Vishwaroopam (2013), found the ethnicity of the characters in the film to be a continuation of Haasan's inclusion of non-Tamil characters in his films. Rangan considered this to be Haasan's acknowledgement of the "interconnectedness of the nation" and "the world beyond India". He noted in his article that Haasan had experimented with the concept before by including the usage of Bengali language and meeting Bengalis in Mahanadhi (1994), a Telugu-speaking love interest in Nammavar (1994), marrying a Bengali woman in Hey Ram (2000), conducting investigations with an American associate in Vettaiyaadu Vilaiyaadu (2006), and marriage to a Frenchwoman in Manmadan Ambu (2010). Rangan notes that in Anbe Sivam, the inclusion of and interaction with the Odia people was another example of including non-Tamil characters in his films. Rangan also compared Haasan's fight sequence with the use of an umbrella to the way he used a book and stool in Thoongathey Thambi Thoongathey (1983).

The basic plot of Anbe Sivam was reported to have similarities with the 1987 road film, Planes, Trains and Automobiles directed by John Hughes, which starred Steve Martin and John Candy. The critics noted Haasan and Madhavan's character share similar traits to that of the roles played by Candy and Martin in that film, respectively. The portrait painted by Nallasivam on the walls of Padayatchi's house is inspired by the Mexican painter Diego Rivera's fresco, Man at the Crossroads. Srinivasa Ramanujam, writing for The Times of India in 2008, noted that the religious undertone in the film was similar to that of Rajinikanth's Baba (2002).

== Music ==
The soundtrack album and background score for Anbe Sivam were composed by Vidyasagar and the lyrics for the songs were written by Vairamuthu and P. Vijay. After composing the tune for the title song, Vidyasagar explained the situation of the song to Haasan, who wanted the song to be performed in such a way that the protagonist is singing according to the situation he finds himself in. Vidyasagar suggested that Haasan should sing the song himself to achieve the desired result, which the latter accepted. The song "Mouname Paarvayai" was not included in the film. The song "Poovaasam" is based on the Shuddh Sarang raga. (Note: According to singer Charulatha Mani, the Shuddh Sarang raga closely resembles the Carnatic raga, Hamsanadam.) The male portions for the reprise of "Poovaasam" were sung by Sriram Parthasarathy, while the original version was sung by Vijay Prakash. Sadhana Sargam sang her portion of both versions of the song.

Malathi Rangarajan of The Hindu wrote, "Vidyasagar is scaling great heights as a composer. The theme song and the melodious "Pon Vaasam" [sic] are pointers. Vairamuthu's lyrics deserve special mention here." Singer Charulatha Mani, in her column for The Hindu, "A Raga's Journey", noted, "Poovaasam" possessed "a charm that is born out of classicism incorporated in a populist piece". Arkay of Rediff.com found the songs to be "at best, okay". M. Suganth of The Times of India, in his review for the music album, "Lovers Special – Vol. 2–4", included "Poovaasam" among the "Hot Picks" of the album.

All lyrics are written by Vairamuthu, except the song "Mouname Paarvayai" was written by Pa. Vijay.

Tamil track listing
No.	Title	Singer(s)	Length
1.	"Anbe Sivam"	Kamal Haasan, Karthik	4:22
2.	"Elo Machi"	Kamal Haasan, Udit Narayan	4:37
3.	"Mouname Paarvayai"	S. P. Balasubrahmanyam, Chandrayee	4:39
4.	"Poovaasam"	Vijay Prakash, Sadhana Sargam	4:30
5.	"Naatukkoru Seithi"	Kamal Haasan, Chandran	8:12
6.	"Elo Machi" (Reprise)	Udit Narayan, Tippu	4:37
7.	"Poovaasam" (Reprise)	Sriram Parthasarathy, Sadhana Sargam	4:25
Total length:			35:16

Telugu track listing
No.	Title	singer(s)	Length
1.	"Nee Roopam Chitristhunte"	S. P. Balasubrahmanyam, Gopika Poornima
2.	"Ore Bujji Bujji"	S. P.Balasubrahmanyam, Mano
3.	"Nenu Shivam"	Kamal Haasan
4.	"Mouname Pataga"	S. P. Balasubrahmanyam, S. P. Sailaja
5.	"Deshanne Melukolupaga"	S.P. Balasubrahmanyam
6.	"Nenu Shivam" (reprise)	S.P. Balasubrahmanyam

== Release ==
According to S. R. Ashok Kumar of The Hindu, the producers were confident that Anbe Sivam would be a strong competitor at the 50th National Film Awards that they had the film reviewed by the Central Board of Film Certification before the end of 2002 so that they could enter the film into the annual awards list. The film was released on 15 January 2003, which coincided with the Pongal festival. It opened alongside five other films, including Vikram's Dhool, Vijayakanth's Chokka Thangam, and Vaseegara, which featured Vijay.

Anbe Sivam was screened as a part of the Indian Panorama section of the International Film Festival of India in 2003. As a tribute to Safdar Hashmi, a special preview of the film was organised by Haasan in association with Safdar Hashmi Memorial Trust (SAHMAT) on 9 January 2003 at Siri Fort Auditorium. The film was dubbed into Telugu as Sathyame Sivam and released on 28 February 2003. It was dubbed into Hindi as Shivam and was released two years later in 2005. After the release of the original Tamil version, the dubbing rights for the Hindi version were sold at a low price, much to the irritation of the lead actors as they were not able to dub for themselves in Hindi.

== Reception ==
=== Critical response ===
Baradwaj Rangan described the film as "Kamal's latest solo attempt to bend, twist, shape-shift Tamil cinema into forms never-before seen." In his review of the film's DVD, M. Suganth, writing for The Times of India, called it "one of the finest movies of the decade" and praised the story, screenplay and dialogues before terming the film as "a modern classic". Reviewing the Telugu dubbed version, Sathyame Sivam, Jeevi of Idlebrain.com said that "this art-kind-of film does entertain the people who love Kamal Hassan flicks" while concluding that it "would remain as one of the good films made in the recent times".

Malathi Rangarajan of The Hindu believed that "well-defined characters, a strong storyline and intelligent screenplay" were the film's "vital ingredients". She further complimented Haasan's treatment of the story, and that his "diligence that has gone into the chiselling of the story and screenplay is only too evident" while calling the film "a laudable effort". P. Devarajan of Business Line appreciated Haasan's performance and facial expressions and concluded his review by stating, "This man has intrigued me and will always." Another critic from The Hindu, Gudipoodi Srihari, appreciated the pair of Haasan and Madhavan, noting that the duo "make a fine combination of pals each with different mental make up, but goodness overflowing." Sujatha Narayanan, in a retrospective review for The New Indian Express commended Haasan's writing and Madhan's dialogue, finding them to be "peppered with sharp wit, trivia and emotional depth." Malini Mannath of Chennai Online wrote "Sensitive and touching, light-hearted and humourous [sic], it's a film to be watched". Anu of Kalki praised the acting of Kamal Haasan and Madhavan, cinematography and dialogues but felt lengthy dialogues about god will bore audience and also found street drama too lengthy and concluded calling the film as eno salt for indigestion after watching films on police-goon and teenage love. Jayalakshmi K. of Deccan Herald wrote "Love is God, the title says, and that is what this film is all about. This truth is told effortlessly in a simple story spun by the superstar himself. The film, directed by Sunder C, is a moving story that unfolds during a troubled journey that throws together two diametrically opposite personalities in circumstances that bring them close to each other and to the realities of life".

A reviewer from Sify, in comparison, labelled the film as "average", stating that it was "another predictable and corny film which is neither a comedy caper nor a class act." Similarly, Arkay of Rediff.com praised the performances of the lead cast but wrote the film "tries to do too many things, and ends up failing at most, if not all, of them." S. Anand of Outlook felt the film's thematic ideas of communism were presented in a "clichéd" manner, and summarised by saying, "If Rajnikant staked claim to divinity on a right-wing plank with Baba, Kamal does it with pretensions to rationalist-left rhetoric."

=== Box office ===
During the first week of its theatrical run, an analysis by Sudhish Kamath of The Hindu showed the film to have grossed ₹13.1 million in Chennai alone. Despite this, the film underperformed at the box office and incurred heavy losses for Lakshmi Movie Makers, effectively stopping them from investing in other ventures for the year 2003. An estimate by D. Govardan of The Economic Times places the losses at ₹65 million, while Arun Ram of India Today states the losses incurred to be ₹50 million. Srinivasa Ramanujam of The Times of India compared the film's failure at the box office to that of Baba. Both K. Muralitharan and Haasan defended the film's failure by blaming video piracy, with the latter stating that "lots of people saw it, but they didn't pay".

== Accolades ==
Award	Date of ceremony	Category	Recipient(s) and nominee(s)	Result	Ref.
Filmfare Awards South	12 June 2004	Special Jury Award	K. Muralitharan, V. Swaminathan, G. Venugopal	Won	
Filmfare Awards South	12 June 2004	Best Film	K. Muralitharan, V. Swaminathan, G. Venugopal	Nominated	
Filmfare Awards South	12 June 2004	Best Actor	Kamal Haasan	Nominated	
Filmfare Awards South	12 June 2004	Best Supporting Actor	Madhavan	Nominated	
South Indian Cinematographers Association (SICA) Awards	23 November 2003	Best Actor	Kamal Haasan	Won	
South Indian Cinematographers Association (SICA) Awards	23 November 2003	Best Supporting Actor	Madhavan	Won	
South Indian Cinematographers Association (SICA) Awards	23 November 2003	Best Art Director	M. Prabhaharan	Won	
Tamil Nadu State Film Awards	30 September 2004	Best Actor	Madhavan (also for Kannathil Muthamittal and Run)	Won	
Tamil Nadu State Film Awards	30 September 2004	Best Make-up Artist	V. P. Rajan	Won	

== Legacy ==
There's only one artiste in the whole Universe (!). It's Kamal Hassan. Without him there's no cinema. Have you watched Anbe Sivam?

— Actor Nagesh in an interview with Malathi Rangarajan of The Hindu on whom he considered to be "the best actor".

Following its release, Anbe Sivam has attained cult status in Tamil cinema and receives re-runs on television channels. When the film was in post-production, Haasan revealed to film critic and journalist Subhash K. Jha that he was impressed with Madhavan's enthusiasm and performance during the making of the film, subsequently signing him to appear as the protagonist in his production venture, Nala Damayanthi (2003). In 2025, Anbe Sivam was selected as one of the 25 best Indian films of the 21st century by The Hollywood Reporter India.

Baradwaj Rangan wrote that Anbe Sivam was "leagues ahead of the average Tamil – why, even Indian – film", though he felt that "the masses were unwilling to accept the experimental nature of the film", while talking about the film's box office failure. During his acceptance speech after winning the Vijay Award for Best Director in 2010 for Naan Kadavul (2009), director Bala revealed that a scene in Anbe Sivam where Haasan says to Madhavan, "when we love others unconditionally without any expectation, we become Gods", inspired him to make his film. Bala also made a reference to Anbe Sivam in his 2003 film, Pithamagan, in a scene where Suriya's character goes for a screening of the film with his friends. A dialogue told by Haasan to Madhavan, "Do you know what a tsunami is? Periya alai illa ... malai." (It's not just a big wave ... it's a mountain) also attained popularity.

In 2008, S. R. Ashok Kumar of The Hindu listed Anbe Sivam among the "top five directorial ventures of Sundar C." In a 2008 interview with The Times of India, Sundar C. stated that Anbe Sivam "changed [him] personally and professionally", making him a more confident person and altering his outlook towards life. He later contradicted his statement after revealing that the film's failure led him to become almost bankrupt and he remained unpaid for his work. The Income Tax Department froze his bank accounts for a year as he was not able to pay his taxes. He admitted that while he received praises for the film after its theatrical run, he would not make a film similar to Anbe Sivam any more and that he chose to continue making commercial cinema, which he felt better matched his interests. In 2013, Haricharan Pudipeddi of the Indo-Asian News Service agency, included Anbe Sivam in his list of "Kamal's most underrated films". He believed the reason for the film's commercial failure was that audiences misunderstood the "sarcastic undertones associated with atheism". On Haasan's birthday, 7 November 2015, Latha Srinivasan of Daily News and Analysis considered Anbe Sivam to be one of the "films you must watch to grasp the breadth of Kamal Haasan's repertoire". The character of Nallasivam was ranked fourth in The Times of India's list of "Kamal Haasan's top 10 mind-blowing avatars".

In Vasool Raja MBBS (2004), the character Vasool Raja (Haasan), while attending a class asks whether being a doctor is equivalent to being God, and in doing so says "Anbe Venkatachalam", to which one of his classmates gently asks him, "isn't it Anbe Sivam?". Haasan retorts: "Let it be. Let's try something different for a change." The street theatre sequence featuring Nallasivam and his friends performing to make people aware of the atrocities committed by Kandasamy Padayatchi was re-created at Tiruchirappalli in 2008 by Pralayan and his troupe from "Chennai Kalai Kuzhu" under the title Nammal Mudiyum. In contrast, Pralayan's play explored gender inequality and domestic violence instead of unemployment. Kannada actor Vishnuvardhan noted in 2010 that fellow actor Sudeep's film Just Maath Maathalli (2010) bears resemblance to Anbe Sivam. Hari Narayan, writing for The Hindu in 2014, mentions in his article on the Indian rationalist and author Narendra Dabholkar that Umesh Shukla's OMG – Oh My God! (2012) was "a toned down version of Anbe Sivam where rationality propels humans to find God in themselves, with flaws, which extols the virtue of becoming as much as that of being". In 2015 Uthiran of Hindu Tamil Thisai in Tamil, mentions in his review of Orange Mittai (2015) that the film's plot might remind viewers of Anbe Sivam. In 2017, Ashok, who directed the comedy film Peechankai, mentioned he was inspired by Anbe Sivam to become a director.

== Film ==
- Anbe Sivam (motion picture) (in Tamil). India: Lakshmi Movie Makers.
