= Tamil Nadu State Film Award for Best Cinematographer =

Indian film award

The Tamil Nadu State Film Award for Best Cinematographer is given by the state government as part of its annual Tamil Nadu State Film Awards for Tamil-language (Kollywood) films.

== The list ==
List of winners and nominated work
Year	Recipient	Work(s)
1968	P. N. Sundaram	Uyarndha Manithan
1969	Marcus Bartley	Shanti Nilayam
1970	Amirtham	Sorgam
1971	No Award	
1972	No Award	
1973	No Award	
1974	No Award	
1975	No Award	
1976	No Award	
1977–78	Babu	Kaatrinile Varum Geetham
1978–79	• A. Somasundaram • Nallusami, Gnanasekar • Tiwary	• Madhurageetham • Aval Appadithan • Azhage Unnai Aarathikkiren
1979–80	B. S. Lokanath	Ninaithale Inikkum
1980–81	Ashok Kumar	Nenjathai Killathe
1981–82	B. Kannan	Alaigal Oivathillai
1982–83	Soumendu Roy	Kann Sivanthaal Mann Sivakkum
1984	No Award	
1985	No Award	
1986	No Award	
1987	No Award	
1988	Ajayan Vincent	Paadatha Thenikkal
1989	Ashok Kumar	Andru Peytha Mazhaiyil
1990	Abdul Rahman	Kizhakku Vaasal
1991	R. Ragunatha Reddy	Azhagan
1992	Santosh Sivan	Roja
1993	M. C. Shekhar	Walter Vetrivel
1994	Jeeva	Kaadhalan
1995	Santosh Sivan	Indira
1996	Arthur A. Wilson	Sundara Purushan
1997	Thangar Bachan	Kaalamellam Kadhal Vaazhga
1998	Annadurai	Unnidathil Ennai Koduthen
1999	Ilavarasu	Manam Virumbuthe Unnai
2000	Ananda Kuttan	Kannukkul Nilavu
2001	R. Rathnavelu	Nandhaa
2002	Arjun Jena	Kadhal Virus
2003	N. K. Ekambaram	Iyarkai
2004	B. Kannan	Kangalal Kaithu Sei
2005	R. D. Rajasekhar	Ghajini
2006	Ravi Varman	Vettaiyaadu Vilaiyaadu
2007	Nirav Shah	Billa
2008	Arthur A. Wilson	Naan Kadavul
2009	Manoj Paramahamsa	Eeram
2010	Santhosh Sivan, V. Manikandan	Raavanan
2011	Balasubramaniem	180
2012	M. Sukumar	Kumki
2013	Siddharth	JK Enum Nanbanin Vaazhkai
2014	Nirav Shah	Kaaviya Thalaivan
2015	Ramji	Thani Oruvan
2016	Balasubramaniem	Kathakali
2017	P. Chelladurai	Thiruttu Payale 2
2018	R. Velraj	Kadaikutty Singam & Vada Chennai
2019	Theni Eswar	Peranbu
2020	N K Ekambaram	Ka Pae Ranasingam
2021	Richard M. Nathan	Maanaadu
2022	Arthur A. Wilson	Iravin Nizhal

== See also ==
- Tamil cinema
- Cinema of India
