= Arthur A. Wilson =

Indian cinematographer (born 1968)

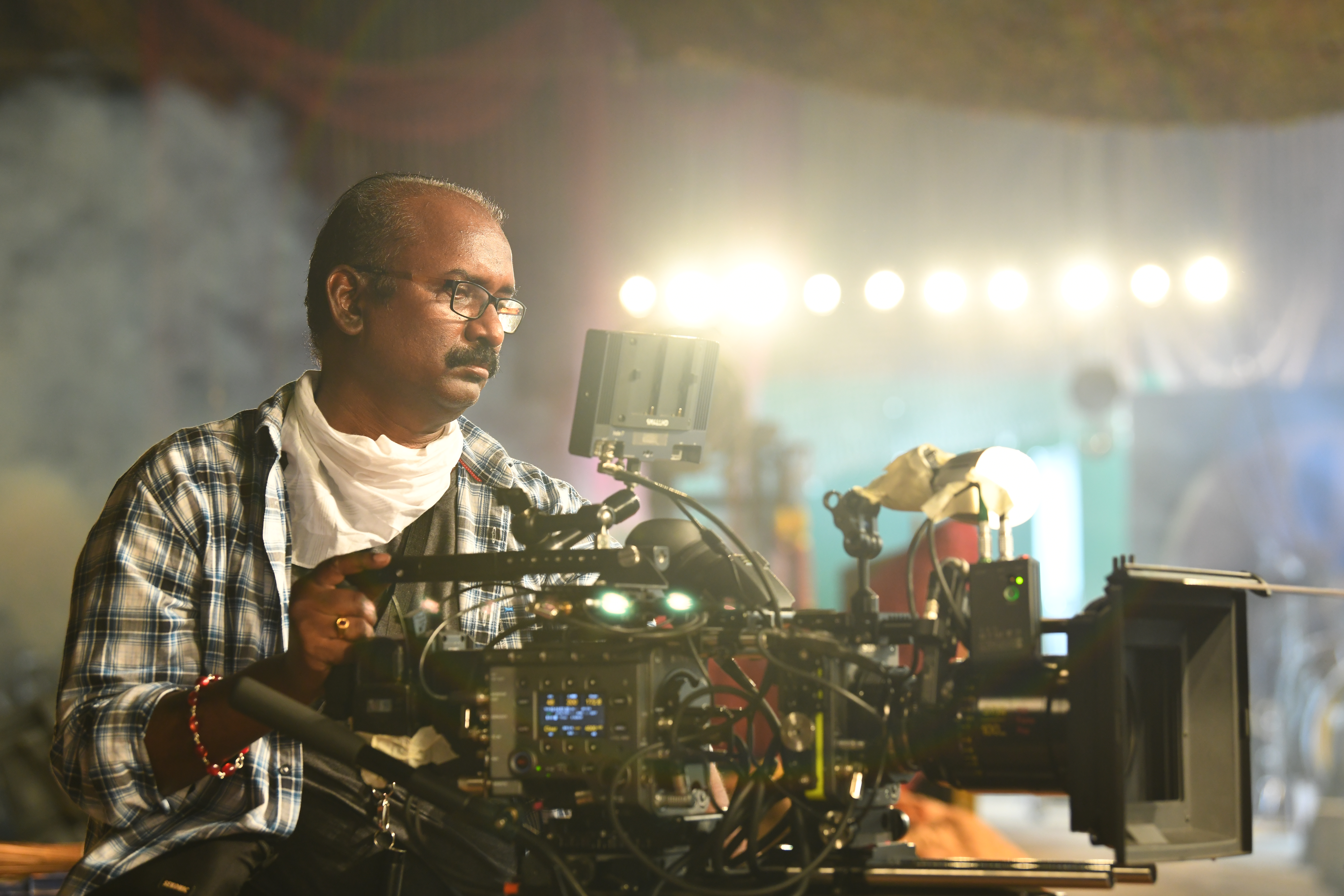
- Born: 16 March 1968; Koneripatti, Attur, Salem District
- Occupation: Director of photography
- Writing career
- Language: Tamil
- Period: 1996–present
- Website: www.arthurawilson.com

Arthur A. Wilson is an Indian cinematographer and director of photography who works predominantly in Tamil and Telugu cinema. With a career spanning several decades, he is known for his work in films such as Anbe Sivam (2003), Imsai Arasan 23rd Pulikecei (2006), Naan Kadavul (2009), Avan Ivan (2011) and Iravin Nizhal (2022). His cinematography has earned him two Tamil Nadu State Film Awards for Best Cinematographer.

Wilson began his career in the mid-1990s, making his debut as a cinematographer with the Tamil film Sundara Purushan (1996). He subsequently worked across a range of genres, collaborating with directors including K. S. Ravikumar, N. Lingusamy, Bala, K. S. Ravindra and Boyapati Srinu. His filmography encompasses romantic dramas, comedies, action films and character-driven narratives in both Tamil and Telugu cinema.

Among his notable works is Naan Kadavul, directed by Bala, for which he received the Tamil Nadu State Film Award for Best Cinematographer. He also served as cinematographer for Iravin Nizhal, directed by R. Parthiban, a film presented as a non-linear single-shot feature. The project received recognition at several international film festivals and cinematography award competitions.

Wilson’s body of work reflects an engagement with visual composition, lighting and the relationship between images and narrative. His career includes collaborations with established filmmakers across South Indian cinema, alongside work in a variety of cinematic styles and production scales.

He won the Tamil Nadu State Award twice for Best Cinematography, Cult Movies International Film Festival award, Oniros Film Awards and other international awards for Iravin Nizhal (2023).

== Filmography ==
Movie	Year	Language	Notes
1996	Sundara Purushan	Tamil	Tamil Nadu State Film Award for Best Cinematographer
1997	VIP	Tamil	
1998	Sollamale	Tamil	
1999	En Swasa Kaatre	Tamil	
1999	Jodi	Tamil	
2000	Vaanathaippola	Tamil	
2000	Rhythm	Tamil	Only songs
2001	Aanandham	Tamil	
2001	Poovellam Un Vasam	Tamil	
2001	Shahjahan	Tamil	
2002	Panchathantiram	Tamil	
2002	Pammal K. Sambandam	Tamil	
2003	Anbe Sivam	Tamil	
2003	Thithikudhe	Tamil	
2005	Ji	Tamil	
2005	Bhadra	Telugu	
2005	Kannadi Pookal	Tamil	
2006	Imsai Arasan 23rd Pulikecei	Tamil	
2006	Saravana	Tamil	
2006	Varalaru: The History of Godfather	Tamil	
2009	Naan Kadavul	Tamil	Tamil Nadu State Film Award for Best Cinematographer
2009	Solla Solla Inikkum	Tamil	
2010	Simha	Telugu	
2011	Avan Ivan	Tamil	
2012	Dammu	Telugu	
2013	Tadakha	Telugu	
2014	Power	Telugu	
2016	Sardaar Gabbar Singh	Telugu	
2017	Juliet Lover of Idiot	Telugu	
2018	Saakshyam	Telugu	
2019	Vinaya Vidheya Rama	Telugu	
2021	Parris Jeyaraj	Tamil	
2022	Iravin Nizhal	Tamil	Cinema's first ever non-linear single shot feature film; Cult Movies International Film Festival, Oniros Film Awards
2023	Waltair Veerayya	Telugu	
2023	Single Shankarum Smartphone Simranum	Tamil	
2023	Extra Ordinary Man	Telugu	
2024	Garudan	Tamil	
2024	My Perfect Husband	Tamil	TV series
2026	Husband On Duty	Tamil	Yet to release

== Awards ==
- Tamil Nadu State Film Award for Best Cinematographer for Sundara Purushan (1996)
- Tamil Nadu State Film Award for Best Cinematographer for Naan Kadavul (2008)
- Oniros Film Awards - New York for Iraivin Nizhal (2022)
- Cult Movies International Film Festival for Iraivin Nizhal (2022)
- European Cinematography Awards for Iraivin Nizhal (2022)
- New York Cinematography Awards for Iraivin Nizhal (2022)
- Bright International Film Festival for Iraivin Nizhal (2022)
- Depth of Field International Film Festival for Iraivin Nizhal (2022)
- Chennai International Film Festival for Iraivin Nizhal (2022)
- Tagore International Film Festival for Iraivin Nizhal (2022)
- 7 Colors Lagoon Bacalar International Film Festival for Iraivin Nizhal (2022)
- HIFF - Halo International Film Festival for Iraivin Nizhal (2022)
- LAFA Los Angeles Film Awards for Iraivin Nizhal (2022)
- South Film and Arts Academy Festival for Iraivin Nizhal (2022)
