= Nallavan (1988 film) =

- Poster
- Directed by: S. P. Muthuraman
- Written by: Kalaipuli S. Thanu
- Produced by: Kalaipuli S. Thanu; Ibrahim Rowther
- Starring: Vijayakanth; Radhika; M. N. Nambiar
- Cinematography: T. S. Vinayagam
- Edited by: R. Vittal; C. Lancy
- Music by: Chandrabose
- Production companies: Kalaippuli International; Tamilannai Cine Creation
- Release date: 15 August 1988
- Running time: 140 minutes
- Country: India
- Language: Tamil

Nallavan (transl. Good Man) is a 1988 Indian Tamil-language action film, directed by S. P. Muthuraman and produced by Kalaipuli S. Thanu and Ibrahim Rowther. It stars Vijayakanth, Radhika and M. N. Nambiar. The film, released on 15 August 1988, was a box office success.

== Plot ==
Gurumoorthy and Raja are twin brothers. Guru is set to marry a collector. On the day of the marriage, Raja is kidnapped and shown a photo where he is stabbing Manju. Raja realises it is Guru in the photo. What transpires later forms the crux of the story.

== Cast ==
- Vijayakanth in a dual role as
  - Gurumoorthy "Guru"
  - Raja
- Radhika as Collector Ponni
- M. N. Nambiar as Guru and Raja's father
- S. S. Chandran as Point
- Janagaraj as Madhu
- Kitty as Vikram
- Vani Viswanath as Radha
- Manimala as Guru and Raja's mother
- Disco Shanti as Manju
- Thyagu as Peter
- Charle as Raja's friend
- Chinni Jayanth as Raja's friend
- Achamillai Gopi as Shankar

== Production ==
Kalaipuli S. Thanu expressed his interest to produce a film with S. P. Muthuraman as director and Vijayakanth as lead which eventually became Nallavan. The film featured Vijayakanth in dual roles and most of the scenes involving them together in single frame were shot using Mitchell Camera by the cinematographer T. S. Vinayagam.

The stunt scenes and a song were picturised and shot at Kashmir. Muthuraman revealed that the crew faced tough time to shoot at the 600 feet hills for a fight sequence, they had to use horses travel to hills and also used to transport costumes and foods there. The climax fight sequence was shot with 100 lorries which came to Ladakh to provide food to people there.

== Soundtrack ==
The music was composed by Chandrabose and the lyrics were written by Thanu.

Song	Singers	Length
"Aaraaro Naan"	S. P. Balasubrahmanyam, Vanitha	04:32
"Mellam Kotti"	Malaysia Vasudevan, K. S. Chithra	04:31
"Ullathil Ondru"	S. P. Sailaja	04:34
"Vaanam Boomi"	S. P. Balasubrahmanyam	06:10
"Vaanmegam"	S. P. Balasubrahmanyam, K. S. Chithra	04:37
"Vetrimala Vetridhan"	S. P. Balasubrahmanyam	04:32

== Reception ==
N. Krishnaswamy of The Indian Express wrote, "The script is full of holes [..] Thanu, the producer of the film is credited with the script too. He has only himself to blame. S. P. Muthuraman directs the film as best as he can within the limitations of the canvass". Jayamanmadhan of Kalki also criticised the film for its writing.

== Bibliography ==
- Muthuraman, S. P. (2017) [2005]. AVM Thandha SPM (in Tamil) (3rd ed.). Vikatan. OCLC 607342391.
