= Bharathan (film) =

- Poster
- Directed by: Sabapathy Dekshinamurthy
- Story by: Rajkumar Santoshi
- Based on: Ghayal by Rajkumar Santoshi
- Produced by: A. S. Ibrahim Rowther
- Starring: Vijayakanth; Bhanupriya
- Cinematography: Rajarajan
- Edited by: G. Jayachandran
- Music by: Ilaiyaraaja
- Production company: Rowther Films
- Distributed by: Srinivasulu
- Release date: 16 April 1992
- Running time: 120 minutes
- Country: India
- Language: Tamil

Bharathan (/bərəðən/) is a 1992 Indian Tamil-language action drama film, directed by Sabapathy Dekshinamurthy in his debut, and produced by A. S. Ibrahim Rowther. The film stars Vijayakanth and Bhanupriya, while S. P. Balasubrahmanyam, Anandaraj, Napoleon, Sumitra, and Chandrasekhar play supporting roles. It is a remake of the Hindi film Ghayal (1990). The film was released on 16 April 1992, and completed a 100-day run.

== Plot ==
Bharathan is sent to jail for a murder and is sentenced to the death penalty.

In the past, Bharath was in love with Indhu. He had a brother named Ramkumar and a sister-in-law named Janaki. His brother dreamt to see him as a government official, but Bharath preferred to be a kickboxing champion.

One day, Ramkumar disappeared, and Bharath began to look for him. Finally, Ramkumar's labourer explained to Bharath what happened to his brother. Gangadharan, a powerful businessman, helped Ramkumar in his business. Ramkumar was grateful to him, and Gangadharan took some advantages and began to smuggle alcohol illegally in Ramkumar's company. When Ramkumar decided to report it to the police, he was kidnapped by Gangadharan. Gangadharan killed Ramkumar, and the innocent Bharath is arrested for the murder. Bharath appointed his family friend Viswanathan as the advocate, but Viswanathan, an ally of Gangadharan, betrayed him, and Bharath was sentenced to capital punishment. Thereafter, Janaki committed suicide.

In jail, Bharath makes friends with his cellmates, and they escape from jail to punish Gangadharan. Johnson, an honest CID officer, is appointed to protect Gangadharan. Bharath first kills the traitor Viswanathan. He then threatens the commissioner and his family to kill Gangadharan more easily.

In the meantime, Indhu is kidnapped by Gangadharan's henchmen, and Bharath saves her in time. Shameful to protect a criminal and worried to punish an innocent, the commissioner and Johnson try to stop Bharath. In the end, Bharath kills Gangadharan and gets sent to jail.

== Cast ==
- Vijayakanth as Bharathan a.k.a. Bharath
- Bhanupriya as Indhu
- S. P. Balasubrahmanyam as Ramkumar
- Anandaraj as Gangadharan
- Napoleon as CID Johnson
- Sumitra as Janaki
- Auditor Sridhar as Viswanathan
- Chandrasekhar as Ramkumar's labourer
- Vasu Vikram as Bharath's cellmate
- R. Sundarrajan as Gangadharan's man
- Srividya as Lakshmi
- Ponnambalam as Gangadharan's right hand
- Srihari as Uttam Singh (guest appearance)
- Prabhu Deva in a special appearance
- Disco Shanti in an item number

== Production ==
Anandaraj reprises the role originally played by Amrish Puri. Due to the wide age gap between the actors, Anandaraj sported a certain getup to match his character's age, and claimed the others on set did not recognise him.

== Soundtrack ==
The music was composed by Ilaiyaraaja.

Song	Singer(s)	Lyrics	Length
"Azhage Amuthe"	Ilaiyaraaja	Ponnadiyan	4:45
"Nalveenai Naatham"	Ilaiyaraaja	Ponnadiyan	1:55
"Pottathalem"	Mano	Vaali	5:00
"Punnakaiyil Minsaram"	Ilaiyaraaja, S. Janaki	Vaali	5:04
"Vaa Vaathiyare"	K. S. Chithra	Gangai Amaran	4:49

== Critical reception ==
The Indian Express wrote, "Despite the remake of the original being before the eyes, debutant director Saba has been able to warm up for viewers only a lukewarm concoction of various box-office elements".
