= Pudhu Padagan =

- Theatrical release poster
- Directed by: Kalaipuli S. Thanu
- Written by: Kalaipuli S. Thanu
- Produced by: Kalaipuli S. Thanu
- Starring: Vijayakanth; Amala
- Cinematography: Vidya
- Edited by: G. Jayachandran
- Music by: Kalaipuli S. Thanu
- Production company: Kalaippuli International
- Release date: 14 April 1990
- Running time: 130 minutes
- Country: India
- Language: Tamil

Pudhu Padagan (transl. New Singer) is a 1990 Indian Tamil-language action drama film written, produced, directed and scored by Kalaipuli S. Thanu. The film stars Vijayakanth and Amala. It was released on 14 April 1990.

== Plot ==
Manikkam and Devi are cousins and they are in love since their childhood. Durai has a sister Valli and she marries Raja. Devi has a brother, a sister-in-law Gowri and a niece Baby.

Manikkam's former boss smuggles idols from the temples and sells them illegally; he also desires to wed Devi. One day, Manikkam finds the culprit and sends him to jail. Valli and her husband have trouble with Arumugam. Manikkam goes to Raja's village to solve their troubles.

Baby vanishes several times and the doctor says that Baby has a serious disease. To save Baby, they must have a lot of money but the doctor's son asks Devi to marry him and they will operate Baby for free.

When Manikkam is back to his village, he sees Devi married. Devi goes to the doctor's house and the doctor's mother is found dead. Manikkam tells what happened in Raja's village. Raja killed Arumugam, who beat his wife Valli, and Manikkam to save his brother-in-law went to jail for six months.

Lonely without his lover, Manikkam becomes mad. Devi's husband has a car accident and dies before their wedding night. Devi's father-in-law advises her to go to her village to forget this misadventure. Devi's father-in-law treats Manikkam but he fails. With Devi's help, Manikkam becomes again as before and the doctor tells Devi's choice.

Manikkam's former boss tries to rape Devi, but Manikkam kills him and Devi also dies because of her injuries.

== Cast ==
- Vijayakanth as Manikkam
- Amala as Devi
- Sarathkumar as Aadhikesavan, Manikkam's former boss
- Radha Ravi as Ramanthan
- Chandrasekhar as Mani, Devi's brother
- Rajyalakshmi as Gowri
- Baby Aparna as Baby
- Chinni Jayanth
- Charle
- Anandaraj
- Meesai Murugesan as Kunjithapatham
- Usilaimani
- LIC Narasimhan
- Thalapathy Dinesh
- Sivaji Manohar as the doctor's son (guest appearance)
- Anandaraj as Arumugam (guest appearance)

== Production ==
The film was initially titled Theru Paadagan (transl. Street Singer) then retitled Pudhu Padagan. It is Thanu's only directorial venture, and was shot in Ooty.

== Soundtrack ==
The music was composed by Thanu, who also wrote the lyrics.

Song	Singer(s)	Duration
"Adhikaalai Naan Paadum"	S. P. Balasubrahmanyam, K. S. Chithra	4:19
"Akkam Pakkam"	S. P. Balasubrahmanyam, S. Janaki	4:50
"Chinna Poove"	S. P. Balasubrahmanyam	2:30
"Paingkiliye"	S. P. Balasubrahmanyam	0:45
"Aththa Ponnu Vaadi"	S. P. Balasubrahmanyam	4:19
"Enga Mama"	Baby Shalini	1:15
"Kadhoram Kanagambaram"	S. P. Balasubrahmanyam, Sunandha	5:00
"Azhagu Mayil"	S. P. Balasubrahmanyam	4:45
"Vaaraayo Vannakili"	P. Jayachandran	4:01
"Unnai Ninanthu"	S. P. Balasubrahmanyam, Master V. Ganesh	1:12
"Malaiya Kodainju Pathaya Vechu"	S. P. Balasubrahmanyam, K. S. Chithra	4:10
"Mariyatha Koyilile"	Malaysia Vasudevan	8:01

== Critical reception ==
P. S. S. of Kalki wrote that despite the title, there was no newness, no singer, and after seeing the title, as one watches the film they would feel disappointed.
