= Jabili =

- Directed by: S. V. Krishna Reddy
- Screenplay by: S. V. Krishna Reddy
- Dialogue by: Janardhana Maharshi
- Story by: Janardhana Maharshi
- Produced by: M. Arjuna Raju
- Starring: Dilip Thadeshwar; Rekha
- Cinematography: Sarat
- Edited by: Nandamuri Hari
- Music by: S. V. Krishna Reddy
- Production company: Roja Movies
- Release date: 29 November 2001
- Country: India
- Language: Telugu

Jabili (transl. Moon) is a 2001 Indian Telugu-language romantic drama film directed by S. V. Krishna Reddy. The film stars Dilip Thadeshwar and Rekha Vedavyas.

== Cast ==
- Dilip Thadeshwar as Hemanth
- Rekha as Lavanya
- Chandra Mohan as Lavanya's father
- Chalapati Rao as Hemanth's father
- Tanikella Bharani
- Brahmanandam
- Jogi Naidu
- Mallikharjuna Rao
- Sana
- Jayalalita
- M. S. Narayana
- Sudha

== Soundtrack ==
The music is composed by S. V. Krishna Reddy himself. Lyrics by Suddala Ashok Teja, Veturi and Bhuvana Chandra.

- "Ganga Yamuna Godari" - KK, K. S. Chitra
- "Chiguraku Evaro" - P. Unnikrishnan, K. S. Chitra
- "Vayasu Talupu Teriche - P. Unnikrishnan
- "Achamaina Telugu Bajji" - Udit Narayan, Mahalakshmi
- "Jollu Jolly College" - Shankar Mahadevan
- "Pada Pada Nee" - Hariharan, Snehapanth

== Release ==
Despite being complete, the film had trouble finding buyers.

== Reception ==
Gudipoodi Srihari of The Hindu opined that "The film goes haywire due to poor story and dialogues [...] A poor show unexpected of Krishna Reddy, where even the music too lacks the usual vigor and sense". Jeevi of Idlebrain.com said that "The story starts in the interval and drags till the climax. The only console in the film is occasional parallel comedy track by Brahmanandam. This film has no soul". Telugucinema.com wrote "This simple and worn out story, despite the presence of the young and glamorous lead pair, lacks romantic touch. Even music doesn’t enhance the quality or the mood of the film that is expected with the title. The title has no relevance at all in the film". Indiainfo wrote "Jabili is nothing but remix of all the Chitram, Nuvvekavali, Manasantha nuvves together. He took some of the scenes from these films and made a film of his own style, which is so boring. And at the end he leaves hackneyed message that youngsters should stand on their feet before loving. Who needs a message, man?".

== Awards ==
Nandi Awards

- Best Costume Designer - Ghalib
