= Love Khichdi =

- Directed by: Srinivas Bhashyam
- Written by: Srinivas Bhashyam; Manu Joseph; Sandeep Srivastava
- Produced by: KK Pittie
- Starring: Randeep Hooda; Rituparna Sengupta; Sadha; Divya Dutta; Sonali Kulkarni; Riya Sen
- Cinematography: Arjun Jena
- Edited by: Sanjay Sankla
- Music by: Songs: Pritam; Score: Aadesh Shrivastava
- Production company: Pittie Group
- Release date: 28 August 2009
- Running time: 130 minutes
- Country: India
- Language: Hindi

Love Khichdi is a 2009 Indian Hindi-language romantic comedy film directed by Srinivas Bhashyam. The film stars Randeep Hooda, Rituparna Sengupta, Sadha, Divya Dutta, Sonali Kulkarni, and Riya Sen. The film was released on 28 August 2009.

== Synopsis ==
Veer is a bachelor from a small town working as a sous-chef in a five-star hotel in Mumbai, India. He is handsome, charming and easy-going and flirts with and lusts after any woman. With his ego, confusion and commitment issues, it is impossible for him to stop lying. The sometimes smart and sometimes silly observations of his all-male gang of coworkers at the hotel kitchen are of little help until Veer is finally forced to grow up.

== Cast ==
- Randeep Hooda as Veer Pratap Singh
- Rituparna Sengupta as Sharmishta Basu
- Sadha as Sandhya S. Iyengar
- Divya Dutta as Parminder Kaur
- Riya Sen as Deepti Jignesh Mehta
- Sonali Kulkarni as Shanta Bheemrao Bhansode
- Kalpana Pandit as Nafisa Khan
- Saurabh Shukla as Krishnan/Guruji
- Jesse Randhawa as Susan Raj
- Sanjay Mishra as Tambe
- Ujjwal Chopra as Vikas Sharma
- Milind Soman as Subramani Iyer
- Pankaj Kapur as Subramani
- Kiku Sharda as Balwinder Singh

== Soundtrack ==
Love Khichdi

Soundtrack album by Pritam
- Released: 2009
- Genre: Feature film soundtrack
- Producer: Pritam

Pritam chronology
Life Partner (2009)	Love Khichdi (2009)	Dil Bole Hadippa! (2009)

All lyrics are written by Amitabh Verma and Shaleen Sharma.

No.	Title	Singer(s)	Length
1.	"Jazeeren"	Alisha Chinai	4:39
2.	"Zarasa Halkasa"	Shreya Ghoshal	5:06
3.	"Yo Baby"	Shaan	5:17
4.	"Mujh Jaisa Hero"	Mahalakshmi Iyer, Rao Gopal Rao	9:38
5.	"Kyon"	Sunitha Sarathy	5:24
