= Prema Chandrama =

- Promotional poster
- Directed by: Sahuraj Shinde
- Produced by: U.E. Ganesh; G. Kumar; G.S. Jagadish; Sunilkumar Shindhe
- Starring: Raghu Mukherjee; Rekha; Kiran Srinivas
- Cinematography: H. C. Venu
- Music by: V. Harikrishna
- Release date: 8 April 2011
- Country: India
- Language: Kannada

Prema Chandrama (lit. 'Loveable moon') is a 2011 Indian Kannada-language romantic drama film directed by Sahuraj Shinde and starring Raghu Mukherjee, Rekha and Kiran Srinivas. The film released to negative reviews. The film's title is based on a song from Yajamana (2000).

== Cast ==
- Raghu Mukherjee as Sanjay / Palakshi / Devadatta
- Rekha as Chetana
- Kiran Srinivas as Dr. Vijay
- Srinath
- Sumithra
- Umashree as Nurse
- Abhinaya

== Production ==
Prem and Nikita Thukral were initially cast in the lead roles before they were replaced after a week due to differences with the film team.

== Soundtrack ==
The soundtrack was composed by V. Harikrishna.

Track listing
No.	Title	Lyrics	Singer(s)	Length
1.	"Kanngalu Ondadavu"	V. Nagendra Prasad	Harish Raghavendra, Shamitha Malnad	4:34
2.	"Ommome Yaako"	Kaviraj	Sonu Nigam	4:15
3.	"Rastheli Ibbarigunu"	Yogaraj Bhat	Tippu, Sharvya	4:24
4.	"Ondanondu"	Kaviraj	Shankar Mahadevan, Karthik	4:12
5.	"Ellindalo Ondu Swarga"	Kaviraj	Shaan, Anuradha Bhat	4:20
Total length:				21:45

== Reception ==
A critic from Bangalore Mirror wrote that "This film has shades of the Hindi make Deewana. Beware, only shades of that story. The rest of it is in ‘TV serial’ mode". A critic from The Times of India rated the film three out of five stars and wrote that "Director could have done a better job of this sentimental story with good script and neat narration". A critic from IANS wrote that "'Prema Chandrama' is another amateurish attempt of Shinde that has gone haywire because of a bad script".
