= Aegan =

2008 film by Raju Sundaram

- Theatrical release poster
- Directed by: Raju Sundaram
- Written by: S. Ramakrishnan; Raju Sundaram (Dialogue)
- Screenplay by: Raju Sundaram (adapted screenplay); Farah Khan; Abbas Tyrewala; Rajesh Saathi (original screenplay)
- Story by: Farah Khan (original story); Raju Sundaram (additional story)
- Based on: Main Hoon Na (Hindi) by Farah Khan
- Produced by: K. Karunamoorthy; C. Arunpandian
- Starring: Ajith Kumar; Nayanthara
- Cinematography: Arjun Jena
- Edited by: V. T. Vijayan
- Music by: Yuvan Shankar Raja
- Production company: Ayngaran International
- Distributed by: Ayngaran International
- Release date: 27 October 2008
- Running time: 140 minutes
- Country: India
- Language: Tamil

Aegan is a 2008 Indian Tamil-language masala film directed by Raju Sundaram (in his directorial debut) and produced by Ayngaran International. The film is a remake of 2004 Hindi film Main Hoon Na, stars Ajith Kumar and Nayanthara, while Suman, Nassar, Jayaram, Navdeep and Piaa Bajpai play supporting roles. The music was composed by Yuvan Shankar Raja, while cinematography and editing were handled by Arjun Jena and V. T. Vijayan. The film follows a CB-CID officer who embarks on a covert mission to protect a fugitive's daughter by posing as a college student.

Aegan was released on 27 October 2008, coinciding with Diwali, and received mixed reviews from critics.

== Plot ==
Shiva is a CB-CID officer who attempts to foil terrorist John Chinnappa. He is simultaneously attempting to mend relations with his father's estranged first wife and his half-brother Narain. However, complications ensue.

Major John Chinnappa is a scientist who created tablets by operating on human guinea pigs. His ploys have always been controversial but inconclusive due to the lack of witnesses. However, an ex-gang member, General Ram Prasad, became a police approver and is on the verge of revealing John's ploys to the police. However, he is on the run to avoid charges. The case falls to Commissioner Karthikeyan, Shiva's father, who assigns his son to go and help solve the mission.

Karthik tells Shiva to attend college in Tamil Nadu (St. John's College, Ooty) to protect Ram Prasad's daughter Pooja from meeting her father. Shiva pleads that he has never undertaken this type of mission before and knows little about the current generation. The general points out that, by a strange coincidence, Pooja attends school in the same town where Ram Prasad is hiding. Shiva can both protect Pooja and search for Ram Prasad. Shiva goes undercover as a student returning to college after many years away from taking care of the family business. He is much older than the other students, who at first make fun of him because of his lack of newer styles. He also has to deal with the many goofy teachers, as well as Albert Aadiyapatham, the idiotic and forgetful college principal.

Soon, Shiva finds Narain, who is later revealed to be his brother. Pooja is Narain's best friend, and she is secretly jealous that other girls can get his attention, but she cannot. Shiva saves Pooja from John's men, who kidnap her, while Narain and others think that it is a prank. He later becomes a sensation among the students and teachers. He befriends Narain and Pooja. Soon, he falls in love with the chemistry teacher Mallika after being attracted by her beauty and in a bid to convince other students that he is one of them. During his regular jogging sessions, Shiva spots Ram Prasad and chases him until he escapes with the help of a helmet-clad bike rider, who is later revealed to be Narain. Pooja discovers that Narain has been helping her father and feels cheated by him.

Narain apologizes to Pooja many times, but she refuses to talk to him. Irked by this, Narain drinks and explains his actions when John's men come again to kidnap Pooja. They beat up Narain, but Shiva comes to their rescue. Narain and Pooja patch up after the fight. Shiva takes Narain to his home, where he learns that Narain is his brother and meets his mother Kasthuri. The flashback sequences describe Shiva's orphaned childhood and explain why his mother and father live separately.

The next day, when Pooja introduces Ram Prasad to Shiva, Shiva arrests him, much to Pooja and Narain's disappointment. Then everyone in the college, including Mallika, learns that Shiva is a policeman. Shiva then drives Ram Prasad straight to John's hiding place, avoiding the traps that he had set. A fight ensues between Shiva and John's men, where John is finally killed.

In the final scenes, Mallika is shown with Shiva's parents and brother, while Shiva has gone to Afghanistan for another mission.

== Cast ==
- Ajith Kumar as Shiva
- Nayanthara as Mallika
- Suman as Major John Chinnappa
- Nassar as Commissioner Karthikeyan
- Jayaram as Albert Aadiyapatham
- Suhasini as Kasthuri
- Navdeep as Narain
- Piaa Bajpai as Pooja
- Devan as Ram Prasad
- Avinash as Iqbal
- Cochin Haneefa as Hanifa
- Livingston as Professor Kamalakannan
- Sathyan as Mani
- Sriman as John's bodyguard
- Raju Sundaram as narrator (voice only)

== Production ==
=== Development ===
In September 2007, early indications suggested that Ayngaran International were set to make a film starring Ajith Kumar and directed by Venkat Prabhu, however the chance went to first-time director Raju Sundaram, in a project titled Akbar. Despite denying the title, Ajith confirmed the project and stating that he had put on weight and grew a beard for his participation in the project. Following the success of Billa, Ajith Kumar waited until the birth of his first child, in January 2008, before commencing his shoot for the film.

The 40-member unit consisting of Ajith, director Raju Sundaram, cinematographer Arjun Jena, action choreographer Stunt Silva, and a few stuntmen from Chennai flew to Hong Kong on 14 January 2008 and began their first schedule for a 10-day stint.

The portions in Hong Kong were shot showing Ajith's introduction stunt scene set against the skyscrapers, Hong Kong airport, and the sea with the help of Chinese action choreographers. The crew shot schedules in Theni and Yercaud and other locations in South India during the filming. The film finished its talkie portion in early September 2008, and the songs were canned in India as well as parts of Switzerland. The film, initially described as a "musical action comedy". The film previously referred to as Akbar, Ramakrishnan and Anthony Gonsalves was christened as Aegan, a name of Shiva.

=== Casting ===
Following the announcement of the project, tentatively titled as Akbar, Shriya Saran was rumoured to be the heroine, following her successful role in Sivaji: The Boss. However, due to differences, Saran was ousted from the project due to her limited call sheets, as she had to fly to and from America where she was then shooting for her Hollywood film, The Other End of the Line. However other indications claimed that Saran was ousted from the project due to her involvement in Indiralohathil Na Azhagappan, in which she appeared in an item number, which Ajith Kumar was unhappy with due to previous feuds with the lead, Vadivelu of that film. Reports indicated that Parvati Melton had replaced Saran but later denied it signalling that she was not approached.

Suhani Kalita was announced as the second heroine of the project but was later removed for unknown reasons. Several Bollywood heroines including Deepika Padukone, Bipasha Basu, Katrina Kaif, Ayesha Takia, Ileana D'Cruz, Tanushree Dutta and Sneha Ullal were linked to the role, as well as reports that Shriya Saran would reprise the role after making up with Ajith. The role eventually was given to Katrina Kaif, who was set to make her debut in Tamil films with Aegan, however she later opted out due to callsheet clashes. It was announced that Nayantara would play the role of the heroine in the film, following her role opposite Ajith in Billa. In February 2008, it was confirmed that Suman would appear in a villainous role, and Malayalam actor Jayaram will also play a role in the film. Navdeep was cast as Ajith's brother in the film, and got the role ahead of actors including Irfan and Sivakarthikeyan who had also auditioned.

Nassar and Suhasini were selected to play the roles of the parents of Ajith, whilst Raju Sundaram's younger brother, Prabhu Deva was given a chance to make a cameo appearance in the film as a dancer but politely refused. Supporting actors Livingston, Sathyan and Sriman also play roles in Aegan, as does model Piaa Bajpai, who appears as the ladylove to Navdeep. Sivakarthikeyan and Arunraja Kamaraj shot for the film for one day as comedians portraying spies, but following changes to the script, their roles were removed. Yuvan Shankar Raja was signed on as the music composer whilst Arjun Jena was the cinematographer for the project and Milan, who did the art direction for Billa, renews his association with Ajith in the film.

== Soundtrack ==
Aegan

Soundtrack album by Yuvan Shankar Raja
- Released: 9 October 2008
- Recorded: 2008
- Genre: Feature film soundtrack
- Length: 29:08
- Labels: Ayngaran Music; An Ak Audio; Think Music India
- Producer: Yuvan Shankar Raja

Yuvan Shankar Raja chronology
Saroja (2008)	Aegan (2008)	Silambattam (2008)

The soundtrack of Aegan was composed by Yuvan Shankar Raja as was the film score. It was noticeably, the third time Yuvan was scoring music for an Ajith Kumar film, after Dheena (2001) and Billa (2007), the songs of which had been very popular and went on to become chartbusters.

The soundtrack released on 9 October 2008, at a private ceremony at the Hello FM Studios by composer Yuvan Shankar Raja as the lead cast and the director were away shooting the video for the song in Switzerland. The album features 6 tracks overall, including one of the songs ("Hey Salaa") repeated at the end.

No.	Title	Lyrics	Singer(s)	Length
1.	"Hey Salaa"	Snehan	Blaaze, Naresh Iyer, Mohammed Aslam	5:09
2.	"Yahoo Yahoo"	Pa. Vijay	Suvi Suresh, Ujjayinee Roy, Sathyan, Ranjith, Naveen	4:36
3.	"Hey Baby"	Pa. Vijay	Shankar Mahadevan	4:39
4.	"Odum Varayil"	Snehan	KK, Bela Shende	4:31
5.	"Kichu Kichu"	Pa. Vijay	Vasundhara Das, Yuvan Shankar Raja	5:11
Total length:				29:08

== Reception ==
Sify.com claimed that "the trouble with the film is that it looks like an amateurish attempt by debutant director Raju Sundaram" dismissing the climax as "a colossal embarrassment", but adding that "no film is perfect". Ajith Kumar was praised for being "at his best but look[ed] plump and stiff in some scenes where he need to be relaxed and natural", drawing comparisons with a similar feedback from his previous venture, Billa. Nayanthara was said to "look perfect as Mallika, a role that fits her like a glove" with her make-up and costumes "rocking". The reviewer added that "Piaa Bajpai is promising, Jayaram as Principal and Haneefa have been wasted and do little in the way of bringing smiles to the faces of the audience". The review also singles out the performance of rookie cinematographer, Arjun Jena, whose work is labelled as "eye-catching".

Similarly Rediff.com labelled the film as "watchable in parts", giving it negative feedback in comparison with Main Hoon Na. It like Sify, claims that "Aegan loses its spontaneity and meanders between humour and seriousness" in the second half. The reviewer praises Ajith claiming he looks as though he "really did enjoy himself on screen, after a really long time". The reviewer adds that "Nayantara's outfits get smaller and smaller, while the actress herself has nothing more to do than dance in transparent saris and high-heels. Sometimes she looks amused, at others, irritated and bored", comparing her unchallenging roles to previous roles in Sathyam and Kuselan. It criticizes Piaa Bajpai claiming she "hams it to glory", and "makes you want to watch Amrita Rao's naivety in the original", however, it praises Navdeep citing he is "far more natural, but you pity the fact that his role is so small". Rediff also criticized Suman and Sriman labelling their portrayals as "pathetic". In reference to minor characters, Cochin Hanifa is praised while Suhasini Mani Ratnam's role is said to be "terribly dealt with, robbing her part of any sympathy".
