= Accident (2008 film) =

- Directed by: Ramesh Aravind
- Written by: Rajendra Karanth (dialogue)
- Screenplay by: Ramesh Aravind
- Story by: Ramesh Aravind
- Produced by: G. Raghunath; C. Vanishree; Vagmi Yajurvedi; Vishishta
- Starring: Ramesh Aravind; Rekha Vedavyas; Pooja Gandhi; Thilak Shekar
- Cinematography: G. S. Bhaskar
- Edited by: P. R. Soundar Raj
- Music by: Ricky Kej
- Production company: Vishishta Productions
- Release date: 4 April 2008
- Country: India
- Language: Kannada

Accident is a 2008 Indian Kannada language Suspense Thriller film directed by Ramesh Aravind and starring himself, Rekha Vedavyas and Pooja Gandhi. Thilak Shekar and Mohan play supporting roles. The film was a box office success and ran for fifty days.

== Synopsis ==
The movie is a contemporary take on the life of a couple and their journey through time and how they have to fight the eternal battle of good over evil. It's about how they win with support from a set of dear friends. The protagonist of the film is Sawanth (Ramesh Aravind), a radio jockey. His wife is a teacher and a social worker. On returning from a three-week foreign trip, he is shocked to discover that his wife and her co-worker have died in an accident. Sawanth cannot convince himself this is merely an accident and commences an investigation. It is one of the most critically acclaimed films of that decade in Kannada cinema.

== Cast ==
- Ramesh Aravind as Sawanth
- Rekha Vedavyas as Vasundhara
- Pooja Gandhi as Pooja
- Mohan
- Thilak Shekar as Gowda (credited as Thilak)
- Sudha Rani as Suguna Shankar
- H. G. Dattatreya
- Roshan
- Deepa Iyer
- Pushpa
- Veena
- Master Krishna Dheemanth
- Baby Varsha
- Baby Vidya
- Baby Sushma
- Baby Anagha
- Baby Namratha
- Dinesh Babu
- Rajendra Karanth
- Balaji (credited as Bala)
- Mahesh Kumar (credited as Dr. "Longa" Mahesh)
- Pathi Iyer as Bhushan
- Kiran
- Gym Bhaskar
- Rachana Maurya appears in an item song "Jigidu Banthu

== Production ==
Ramesh Aravind and Pooja Gandhi plays RJs while Rekha Vedavyas plays "an idealistic girl who’s very gutsy and stands up for what she believes in". According to Ramesh Aravind, "The audience will witness a very different Ramesh in Accident".

== Soundtrack ==
Accident

Soundtrack album by Ricky Kej
- Released: 5 March 2008
- Genre: Feature film soundtrack
- Label: Anand Audio

Ricky Kej chronology
Accident (2008)	Venkata in Sankata (2009)

Ricky Kej composed the film's background score and music for the soundtracks. The album consists of eight soundtracks. The music was premiered on Radio Mirchi.

Track list
No.	Title	Lyrics	Singer(s)	Length
1.	"Friendship Andre"	Rajendra Karanth	Avinash Chebbi, Devan Ekambaram, Ben Jhonson
2.	"Jigidu Banthu"	Kannadiga Shivu	Kunal Ganjawala
3.	"Ninade Ninade Nenapu"	Rajendra Karanth	S. P. Balasubrahmanyam
4.	"Baa Maleye Baa"	B. R. Lakshmana Rao	Sonu Nigam
5.	"Dheem Dheem"	Rajendra Karanth	Sonu Nigam, Mahalakshmi Iyer
6.	"Preethi Moodo Vele"	Rajendra Karanth	Chaitra
7.	"Jigidu Banthu (Duet)"	Kannadiga Shivu	Kunal Ganjawala, Chaitra
8.	"Baa Maleye Baa (Club Mix)"	B. R. Lakshmana Rao	Sonu Nigam

== Reception ==
R. G. Vijayasarathy of Rediff.com rated the film three out of five stars and wrote that "All in all, Ramesh Arvind's Accident is an enjoyable thriller". A critic from Indiaglitz rated the film nine out of ten and wrote that "Right from the title card till the last frame it is a Ramesh Aravid film very well supported by Vishista productions. A right producer has caught the right actor and director. This is of course a wonderful choice of you in favorite theatres. Go watch it without fail".
