= Arjun Jena =

Indian cinematographer from Chennai (born 1971)

- Born: 6 March 1971 (age 55)
- Occupation: Cinematographer
- Years active: 1990–present

Arjun Jena is an Indian cinematographer from Chennai.

== Career ==
=== Early days ===
During the 1990s, Jena joined cinematographer P. C. Sreeram's unit as an assistant cameraman. He worked under Sreeram in films such as Thevar Magan (1992), Thiruda Thiruda (1993), May Madham (1994), Subha Sankalpam (1994) and Kurudhipunal (1995). Later in 1996, he joined cinematographer Jeeva, a former assistant of Sreeram, as an operating cameraman. He apprenticed under Jeeva in Indian (1996), Ullasam (1997), Vaalee (1999), Kushi (2000), Run (2002), Zor, Hera Pheri and Yeh Teraa Ghar Yeh Meraa Ghar.

=== Independent work ===
Jena got his first break with the short film Silent Scream, directed by Vikram Kumar. It won the National Film Award for Best Educational/Motivational/Instructional Film at the 46th National Film Awards in 1998. He made his feature film debut with Kathir's Tamil feature film Kadhal Virus (2000), which won him the Tamil Nadu State Film Award for Best Cinematographer. His other works include Oka Oorilo, Aegan, Love Khichdi and Ala Modalaindi.

== Filmography ==
Year	Title	Language	Notes
2002	Kadhal Virus	Tamil	Won—Tamil Nadu State Film Award for Best Cinematographer
2005	Oka Oorilo	Telugu	
2008	Aegan	Tamil	
2009	Love Khichdi	Hindi	
2011	Ala Modalaindi	Telugu	
2016	Tulasi Apa	Odia	Won—Odisha State Film Award for Best Cinematography
2017	Koditta Idangalai Nirappuga	Tamil	
