= Jolly Boy =

- Directed by: Sabapathy Dekshinamurthy
- Written by: Sabapathy Dekshinamurthy; Malavalli Saikrishna (dialogues)
- Produced by: K. Manju
- Starring: Diganth; Rekha Vedavyas; Devaraj
- Cinematography: Raana
- Edited by: Sanath Kumar; Thatha Suresh
- Music by: Yuvan Shankar Raja
- Production company: K Manju Films
- Release date: 10 June 2011
- Country: India
- Language: Kannada

Jolly Boy is a 2011 Indian Kannada-language romantic drama film written and directed by Sabapathy Dekshinamurthy, which stars Diganth and Rekha Vedavyas in the lead roles, along with Devaraj, Tara and Sudha Rani. A remake of the director's 2011 Tamil film Pathinaaru, it is produced by K. Manju and features the music by Yuvan Shankar Raja.

== Plot ==
Ganesh (Diganth) and Indusri (Rekha Vedavyas) are college students who both fall in love with each other. However, Indhusri's father Gopalaswamy (Devaraj) and mother Lakshmi (Tara) oppose their love as they do not trust love and try to convince Indusri for which she does not agree. One day, Indusri's mother gives a book titled "19" and asks Ganesh and Indusri to read so that they might change their opinions about love.

Now the story moves back to a village in 1980s which describes a teenage love between Gopi (Faisal Mohammed) and Indu (Archana). Gopi is from a poor family, while Indu is from an affluent family in the same village. When her parents find out about their love, they try all means to separate them. Finally, Gopi and Indu decide to run away from the village, but they are caught by their parents.

Indu goes to the extent of abandoning her family and wealth for the sake of Gopi. She asks Gopi in front of villagers to buy her a saree with his income, so that she can wear that and leave the village as she does not want any of her ancestral wealth and she waits for Gopi's arrival. Gopi goes to a nearby town to earn some money so that he can buy her a saree, but he meets with an accident and goes unconscious. Gopi is saved by a lorry driver and is admitted in a hospital. He recovers after a few months and returns to the village to meet Indu, but is shocked to know that her wedding is on the same day with someone. Gopi is shocked and leaves the village with sorrows.

The book ends there, and Indhu's mother reveals that Gopi is none other than Indhusri's father Gopalaswamy. She also convinces Indhusri that Gopi transformed into Gopalaswamy, which made him successful in life rather than keep worrying about his failed love. Now, Indhu doubts the credibility of love and decides to accept her parents' words.

But Ganesh tries to find the whereabouts of Indu and leaves to the village. After meeting many people, Ganesh finds the place where Indu is currently and goes to meet her. He also takes Gopalaswamy with him. Gopalaswamy is shocked to see Indramma (Kasthuri), who now runs an orphanage in the memory of Gopi. Gopalaswamy gets to know that Indu did not agree for the wedding and came away from her family and till the time she lives with memory of Gopi. Gopalaswamy feels guilty but understands the power of true love and decides to get Ganesh and Indhu married.

== Cast ==
- Diganth as Ganesh
- Rekha Vedavyas as Indusri
- Tara as Lakshmi
- Faisal Mohammed as Gopi
- Archana as Indu
- Neela
- Bank Janardhan
- Aravind Sridhar
- Amogh Hande
- Bhavana
- Johny
- Arasu
- Jayashree Krishna
- Sulochana
- Shashikala
- Lalitha
- Bhagyashree
- Devaraj as Gopalaswamy
- Sudha Rani as Indramma Gopalaswamy

== Soundtrack ==
Jolly Boy

Soundtrack album by Yuvan Shankar Raja
- Released: 12 April 2011
- Recorded: 2008–2010
- Genre: Feature film soundtrack
- Length: 22:58
- Label: Anand Audio
- Producer: Yuvan Shankar Raja

Yuvan Shankar Raja chronology
Vaanam (2011)	Jolly Boy (2011)	Avan Ivan (2011)

The soundtrack to Jolly Boy features 5 tracks composed by Yuvan Shankar Raja; he reused all tunes from the original Tamil version. The album was released in April 2011 by director Indrajit Lankesh at the Abhimani Convention Center, Bangalore.

All lyrics are written by K. Kalyan.

Tracklist
No.	Title	Singer(s)	Length
1.	"Baa Endhare"	Rajesh Krishnan	6:36
2.	"Baanu Nammadhe"	Ajay Warrior	5:08
3.	"Kallu Kooda Kavithe"	Rajesh Krishnan	4:30
4.	"Yedaya Olegondhu"	Hemanth, Nanditha	4:21
5.	"Theme Music"	Yuvan Shankar Raja	2:23
Total length:			22:58

== Reception ==
Shruti Indira Lakshminarayana of Rediff.com rated the film 1 1/2 out of 5 stars and wrote that "The moral of the film: love is about commitment and not about SMSs and gifts. Any takers for this great and highly unoriginal advice on love?"
