= V. I. P. (1997 film) =

- Poster
- Directed by: Sabapathy Dekshinamurthy
- Written by: Sabapathy Dekshinamurthy; K. Selva Bharathy (dialogues)
- Produced by: Kalaipuli S. Thanu
- Starring: Prabhu Deva; Abbas; Simran; Rambha
- Cinematography: Arthur A. Wilson
- Edited by: B. Ramesh
- Music by: Ranjit Barot
- Production company: Kalaippuli International
- Distributed by: V Creations
- Release date: 4 July 1997
- Running time: 154 minutes
- Country: India
- Language: Tamil

V. I. P. is a 1997 Indian Tamil-language romantic comedy film directed and co-written by Sabapathy Dekshinamurthy. The film stars Prabhu Deva, Abbas, Rambha and Simran, while Rami Reddy, Anupam Kher and Manivannan play other pivotal roles. Ranjit Barot composed the music, while Arthur A. Wilson handled the cinematography. The film was released on 4 July 1997. This is one of the first two Tamil films of actress Simran, along with Once More.

== Plot ==
Guru is a graduate but cannot find a job because employers are looking for experience. He and his pickpocket and bike thief friend Indhu live along with the mechanic Nizam Bhai and his wife. The couple are Muslim, and the lady observes purdah, and it is shown that whoever lifts her veil and sees her face faints immediately. Nizam Bhai himself has seen his wife's face only on their wedding night. This provides comic relief.

There is a wealthy businessman, but his business is about to topple when he invites his nephew Santhosh from America to save it from loss. Priya is his daughter, and she expects to marry Santhosh when he arrives. Meanwhile, Guru steals a car from a benami of a politician, who launders all his money, but failed to employ him. When his henchmen chase, Guru and Indhu enter into the airport.

In a series of comic events, Guru ends up in Priya's house as Santhosh, and real Santhosh, who tries to save Indhu, lands up with her in Mizoram.

The businessman introduces Guru (now Santhosh) as the new managing director of the company to his employees. He also encourages Santhosh to take up the new assignment. Guru (as Santhosh) is a talented youth, works hard and brings the company back to business with good yield; meanwhile, the real Santhosh struggles with Indhu to get back home. When Santhosh gets back to Chennai, he collects his bags and passport from the airport.

By now, Santhosh has fallen in love with Indhu, and Priya has fallen in love with Guru(thinking him as Santhosh). Indhu and Guru meet up and find out about Guru acting as Santhosh and that the real Santhosh is with Indhu. When Santhosh finds out that Guru has taken the company to greater heights than he would have, he accepts Guru as his friend and does not reveal his true identity to his uncle's family.

In the end, all confusions are cleared, and the lovers unite, with the approval by elders of families.

== Cast ==
- Prabhu Deva as Guru
- Abbas as Santhosh
- Simran as Priya
- Rambha as Indhu
- Manivannan as Nizam Bhai
- Anu Mohan as Rangasamy
- Rami Reddy as James
- Anupam Kher as Priya's father
- Fathima Babu as Priya's mother
- Thideer Kannaiah as Thief
- Joker Thulasi as Thief
- Loose Mohan as Thief
- Oru Viral Krishna Rao as Fake swami
- Azhagu as James' henchman
- Vichu Viswanath as James' henchman
- S. S. Chandran as Nair (guest appearance)
- Prakash Raj as Santhosh's brother (guest appearance)

== Production ==
Pooja Kumar was the first choice for a lead actress role, but walked out of the project due to date issues. Producer Thanu then approached Laila, who was left unimpressed when the producer asked her to consider changing her stage name to Pooja, as the invitations for the film had already been printed. Laila also revealed her unawareness of Rambha also being a part of the film. Laila subsequently dropped out of the project, wanting to make her Tamil debut in a film where she played the sole heroine.

The film consequently marked the debut of actress Simran in Tamil films, with V. I .P. and her other film, Once More both releasing on 4 July 1997. Simran had earlier rejected Tamil films including Bharathiraja's proposed Siragugal Murivathillai, and had garnered popularity in the Tamil film industry prior to the release of her first film. She worked on V. I. P. alongside her commitments for Once More, Nerrukku Ner (1997) and Poochudava (1997). The project also became the first Indian film to have a trailer released online.

== Soundtrack ==
The music was composed by Ranjit Barot. Thanu in an interview for Maalai Malar in 2013 revealed that both Ranjit Barot and Shankar Mahadevan were initially chosen as composers; however Shankar left the film due to creative differences but tuned two songs "Minnal Oru Kodi" and "Netru No No".

Track listing
No.	Title	Lyrics	Singers	Length
1.	"Minnal Oru Kodi"	Vairamuthu	Hariharan, K. S. Chithra	4:29
2.	"Ichankaatule Muyal Onnu"	Arivumathi	KK, Anupama	4:20
3.	"Mayilu Mayilu Mayilamma"	Palani Bharathi	P. Unnikrishnan, Mano, K. S. Chithra, Ranjini	4:28
4.	"Netru No No"	Vairamuthu	Shankar Mahadevan, Dominique Cerejo	5:17
5.	"Indiran Alle"	Palani Bharathi	Dominique Cerejo, Sipra Bose, Anupama	3:56
6.	"Vandhadhe Luck Vandhadhe"	Palani Bharathi	Ranjit Barot	3:58
Total length:				26:28

== Release and reception ==
V. I. P. was released on 4 July 1997. The film did above average business but ended up being a success at the box office, owing to the substantial size of the budget. R. P. R. of Kalki wrote that the team have carefully planned to give a film that is completely fun without pain; there will be no cheating in the yield. K. N. Vijiyan of New Straits Times wrote, "If you don't take the storyline too seriously, you will probably enjoy the movie better".
