= Kadhal Virus =

2002 film directed by Kathir

- DVD cover
- Directed by: Kathir
- Written by: Kathir
- Produced by: Kathir
- Starring: Richard Rishi; Sridevi Vijaykumar
- Cinematography: Arjun Jena
- Edited by: V. T. Vijayan
- Music by: A. R. Rahman
- Production companies: Sound & Light Studios
- Release date: 19 December 2002
- Country: India
- Language: Tamil

Kadhal Virus (transl. Love virus) is a 2002 Indian Tamil-language romance film written, directed and produced by Kathir. The film stars Richard Rishi and Sridevi Vijaykumar, making their Tamil debut in lead roles, with Abbas in a supporting role. A. R. Rahman composed the music, while Arjun Jena was the cinematographer. The film tells the story of a young director, trying to pursue his dream by overcoming all hurdles. It was released on 19 December 2002, and fared poorly at the box office.

== Plot ==
Deepak is an aspiring filmmaker trying to get his first production out. He gets a chance to go to Coonoor to write a script for a movie where he meets and falls in love with Geetha. After a struggle, Geeta understands his love and convinces her father. The couple decide to get married once his first film is made. Deepak leaves for Chennai, promising to write letters to Geeta. However the postman who is secretly in love with Geeta hides all the letters sent by Deepak, including the later changing his address. A chasm develops between the lovers because of the communication issue caused by the postman.

Geeta convinces her father to search for Deepak and finds him successfully in a movie set. However she and her father misunderstand Deepak shouting at his assistants to be words meant for them and they leave. Deepak is heartbroken when he learns of Geeta's visit, however she is lost for ever in his life. Years go past, and now Deepak is a highly successful film director. He is in search of new faces for his upcoming movie. He comes across Rajiv, who is a poor aspiring actor. It however turns out that Rajiv is from a wealthy family, but has chosen a hard life because of his passion to be a movie star. Deepak knows of the hardships of the cine field and advises Rajiv to go back to his family giving up his dream, because Deepak feels Rajiv can lead a better life with his family. This leads to Rajiv getting rejected by other movie directors as well. Deepak does this to help Rajiv lead a good life rather than him struggling and wasting his time. Rajiv however consumes poison and attempts suicide.

Fate leads to Deepak overhearing a conversation between Geeta and her friend in a poor slum. Deepak is initially elated to see Geeta, however he is pained that she lives in such a filthy place. It turns out that Rajiv had married Geeta. She fully supports Rajiv in realising his dream, but is repulsed to learn Deepak still has feelings for her and as a result rejected Rajiv and refuses him to have a career in cine industry. This is a complete misunderstanding on her part. Deepak decides to set things right. He invites Rajiv to his studio and promises he'll be the hero of his movie, under one condition that Rajiv must not tell Geeta that he is playing the protagonist in Deepak's movie. Rajiv is elated, and promises to keep this a secret.

Deepak alters his story to suit Rajiv. Due to the tweaks, the actor originally roped in to play the hero of the movie has to be chucked out of his role. The actor pleads with Deepak not to do it as it would ruin his reputation and dream. Deepak however does not budge and goes ahead with his plan to cast Rajiv. This causes friction between the movie producer and Deepak, leading to the producer dumping him. Deepak, out of his love for Geeta, decides to produce the movie himself, taking loans from creditors. The young actor whom Deepak chucked out of his movie vents out his anger by stabbing Deepak on the movie set. Deepak is admitted to a hospital and his health deteriorates. The creditors demand their money back and Deepak settles the debt with his own money. He continues directing the movie under severe financial and physical strain. He is determined to complete the movie and goes penniless as a result. The movie is completed and released. Deepak watches the movie in a theatre sitting with commoners. He is completely broke and a pauper, but filled with happiness as he has made his lover's wish of making her husband a hero come true.

Rajiv reveals to Geeta about the movie. Geeta is upset when she finds out Deepak is the director, but realises the hardships Deepak had to undergo. By chance she runs into the postman who reveals that it was him rather than Deepak who ruined her life. Geeta goes in search of Deepak, finally meets him in the theatre only to find him dead with a smile on his face.

== Cast ==
- Richard as Deepak
- Sridevi Vijaykumar as Geetha
- Vivek as Puthir
- Abbas as Rajiv
- Raghuvaran as Raghu
- Manorama as Aavudai Aachi
- Pyramid Natarajan as Film producer
- Laxmi Rattan as Geetha's father
- Jaya Murali as Geetha's mother
- Ragasudha as Geetha's friend
- Arvind Kathare as Deepak's friend and Geetha's cousin
- Ramesh Maali as Deepak's friend
- Deepak Dinkar as Deepak's friend
- Vasudevan Baskaran as Sudhakaran
- Srinath as Postman
- Cell Murugan as Police Inspector
- Lekhasri as Woman at the bus stand
- Vellai Subbaiah as Protester
- Theni Kunjarammal as Old woman
- Sakthivel as Theatre owner
- T. G. Thyagarajan as himself (Cameo appearance)
- Kathir as himself (Cameo appearance)
- Mysskin as Kathir's assistant (uncredited role)
- Vetrimaaran as Deepak's assistant (uncredited role)

A sequence in the film stars guest appearances from:

- A. R. Rahman
- Bharathiraja
- Chitra Lakshmanan
- G. M. Kumar
- K. Balachander
- K. S. Ravikumar
- Keyaar
- Mani Ratnam
- Manjula Vijayakumar
- Mansoor Ali Khan
- Nassar
- Nikkil Murugan
- P. Vasu
- Parthiban
- Prashanth
- Raj Kapoor
- Rajkiran
- Ramesh Khanna
- Saran
- Shankar
- Silambarasan
- T. Rajender
- Thalaivasal Vijay
- Vaali
- Vijayakanth
- Vijayakumar
- Vikraman

== Production ==
Srikanth, then a model, was cast in the lead role and was coached acting skills by then-assistant directors such as Vetrimaaran and Mysskin. Srikanth was later dropped and Richard, previously a child actor, was selected to make his debut in the leading role.

Early reports suggested that Bhumika Chawla would star in the film but she later opted out. Her role was later handed to Sridevi Vijaykumar, who would make her Tamil debut as a leading heroine with the film. The team decided to film a sequence with several prominent directors as a part of the film's launch event.

== Soundtrack ==
The soundtrack was composed by A. R. Rahman. The song "Ye Ye Ennachu Unakku" was one of the earliest South Indian film songs to be played on Channel V India, then known mainly for only playing English and Hindi songs.

| Song | Singer(s) | Lyrics |
|---|---|---|
| "Ye Ye Ennachu Unakku" | Vasundhara Das | Pa. Vijay |
| "Sonnalum" | P. Unnikrishnan, Harini | Vairamuthu |
| "Vaan Nila" | Srinivas, Karthik | Vaalee |
| "Enthan Vanil" | S. P. Balasubrahmanyam, Swarnalatha | Pa. Vijay |
| "Baila More" | Silambarasan, Tippu | Vaalee |
| "O Kadhale" | Mano, Clinton Cerejo | Vaalee |

== Reception ==
Malathi Rangarajan of The Hindu mentioned that "the screenplay is incoherent in parts" and that "the dialogue and expressions are sometimes too clichéd". She blamed the film's production delay revealing that "initially the film did kindle a lot of interest — what with A. R. Rahman as composer and a fresh lead pair to boot, but because it has been in the making for too long, the euphoria first triggered did wane a little". Malini Mannath of Chennai Online wrote "So, while taking a lot of effort to put in style and gloss, Kathir forgets to put in even half the effort in his scripting and narration. The scripting is slip-shod, the narration is jerky, and leaves much to be desired. The director totally ignores the time factor, and the continuity in logic, between scenes preceding and those following". Sify wrote, "Blame it on the avalanche of love stories hitting the screen in recent times that directors seem to have run out of ideas. Kathir, the much hyped director wanted to try out something different with Kathal Virus, but has ended up in making an intolerable film". The critic added, "the music of A.R.Rahman does not fit into the narration. The lead pair is a total letdown as Richard and Sridevi looks wooden and uncomfortable". Cinesouth wrote "Cinema means business for some. To some, it is a form of art. For director Kadhir, cinema is poetry. He cant make a film without love, without poetries, without extreme close-ups of roses in bloom and without love letters getting mixed up. 'Kaadhal Virus' has all these ingredients."

The film became a box office failure, with Kathir feeling that having "Virus" in the title was wrong since it possibly led audiences to believe it was about computer viruses.
