= Andala Ramudu (2006 film) =

2006 Indian Telugu-language film by Lakshmi Narayana Pendem

- DVD cover
- Directed by: Lakshmi Narayana Pendem
- Written by: Ramesh-Gopi (dialogues)
- Story by: Livingston
- Produced by: NV Prasad; Paras Jain
- Starring: Sunil; Aarthi Aggarwal; Jai Akash
- Cinematography: Sameer Reddy
- Edited by: Nandamuri Hari
- Music by: S. A. Rajkumar
- Distributed by: Super Good Films
- Release date: 11 August 2006
- Country: India
- Language: Telugu
- Budget: ₹4 crore
- Box office: est. ₹12 crore distributors' share

Andala Ramudu is a 2006 Indian Telugu-language film directed by P Lakshmi Narayana and produced by NV Prasad and Paras Jain. The film starred Sunil and Aarthi Aggarwal. This movie is the remake of Tamil film Sundara Purushan.

Released on 11 August 2006, The film was a success at the box office.

== Plot ==
Ramudu (Sunil) has tremendous love for his cousin Radha (Aarthi Aggarwal) right from his childhood. Things go wrong for him when his mother dies; his father marries another woman which he dislikes and runs away from home. He returns home (to his grandmother) after twelve years only after his father's death. He even accepts his brother (Venu Madhav) born to his step mom.

Ramudu's love for Radha remains unchanged. In fact, he returns home after so long time only to win Radha's love and marry her. On the contrary, Radha loves another person, Raghu (Akash) who is an orphan and also jobless. Radha's father (Kota Srinivasa Rao) dislikes this; he lays a condition that he would agree for their marriage only if Raghu finds a job.

Ignorant of the fact, but with good intention, Ramudu offers a job to Raghu. Later, he learns about the fact and gets despaired. In such a circumstance, Ramudu's brother resolves to unite his brother with Radha and eliminate Ramudu's misery. Ramudu's brother tactfully implicates Raghu in a murder and sends him to prison. Thus he plays a spoil game in averting marriage between Radha and Raghu. In such a distressed condition, Radha's father with no other option remaining pleads with Ramudu to marry Radha. Ramudu readily agrees and marries Radha.

What happens when Radha learns about the fact later? Will she continue her married life with Ramudu or will she go to Raghu or anything strange happens ... The remaining part of the movie is based on these circumstances.

== Cast ==
- Sunil as Ramudu
- Aarthi Aggarwal as Radha
- Akash as Raghu
- Vadivukkarasi as Ramudu's grandmother
- Kota Srinivasa Rao as Bhushanam (Radha's father)
- Brahmanandam
- Dharmavarapu Subramanyam
- Venu Madhav as Badram (Ramudu's stepbrother)
- Kondavalasa
- Chittajalu Lakshmipati
- Ramachandra Rao
- Lakkimsetty
- Master Bharath
- Duvvasi Mohan
- Chalapathi Rao as Ramudu and Badram's father

== Soundtrack ==
Andala Ramudu

Soundtrack album by S. A. Rajkumar
- Released: 2006
- Recorded: 2006
- Genre: Feature film soundtrack
- Length: 23:16
- Label: Aditya Music
- Producer: S. A. Rajkumar

S. A. Rajkumar chronology
| Rajababu (2006) | Andala Ramudu (2006) | Astram (2006) |
External audio
- Official Audio Jukebox on YouTube

Music is composed by S. A. Rajkumar, and released on Aditya Music label.

Track list
| No. | Title | Lyrics | Singer(s) | Length |
|---|---|---|---|---|
| 1. | "Rajadhi Raja" | E.S. Murthy | Tippu, S. A. Rajkumar | 5:06 |
| 2. | "Chinni Chinni" | E.S. Murthy | K. S. Chithra | 3:58 |
| 3. | "Getappu" | Ananta Sriram | S. A. Rajkumar, Kalpana Patowary, Hema | 5:12 |
| 4. | "Jabilli Raave" | E.S. Murthy | Rajesh Krishnan, Shreya Ghoshal | 4:26 |
| 5. | "Seethakoka" | Ananta Sriram | Rajesh Krishnan, Sujatha Mohan | 4:34 |
| Total length: | | | | 23:16 |

== Reception ==
Idlebrain.com gave three stars out of five. Reviewer praised the Sunil performance as a lead actor but criticized the film for its weak story and slow narration. Full Hyderabad also opined the same. Sify criticized the film for its lack luster screenplay.

== See also ==
- Andala Ramudu, is also an earlier period Telugu film, directed by Bapu.
