= Sabapathy Dekshinamurthy =

Indian film director (1963–2024)

Sabapathy
- Born: Sabapathy Dekshinamurthy; 5 October 1963
- Died: 26 December 2024 (aged 61); Tindivanam, Viluppuram district, Tamil Nadu, India
- Other names: S. D. Sabha, Sabapathy, Sabha Kailash
- Occupation: Indian film director
- Years active: 1992–2011

Sabapathy Dekshinamurthy (5 October 1963 – 26 December 2024), also known and credited as S. D. Saba, and Saba Kailash, was an Indian film director, mainly working in the Tamil film industry.

== Life and career ==
Sabapathy Dekshinamurthy started his career after completing his DFT in M.G.R. Government Film and Television Training Institute, formerly known as the Adyar Film Institute and started his career in 1992 with Bharathan. Bharathan was the first Tamil film to become a blockbuster that ran for 100 days in Kerala. After that he went on to direct hit films Sundara Purushan, V.I.P., Punnagai Poove and the critically acclaimed Naam. Sundara Purushan was remade in Telugu as Andala Ramudu in 2006.

In 2001, he began making a film titled Irandu Paer starring Ramki, Roja, Khushbu and Sanghavi. The film however did not release.

Dekshinamurthy briefly worked on the production of a family drama film titled Maa during 2009, featuring Prithviraj, Srikanth, Bhumika Chawla and Madhu Shalini. Despite having a photoshoot and a first schedule in Rameswaram, the film ran into financial difficulties and was later shelved.

Dekshinamurthy died on 27 December 2024, at the age of 61.

== Filmography ==
| Year | Film | Language | Notes |
|---|---|---|---|
| 1992 | Bharathan | Tamil | |
| 1993 | Enga Thambi | Tamil | |
| 1996 | Sundara Purushan | Tamil | |
| 1997 | V.I.P. | Tamil | |
| 2003 | Punnagai Poove | Tamil | |
| 2003 | Naam | Tamil | |
| 2005 | Pandem | Telugu | |
| 2009 | A Aa E Ee | Tamil | |
| 2011 | Pathinaaru | Tamil | |
| 2011 | Jolly Boy | Kannada | |
