= Sundara Purushan (1996 film) =

1996 Indian Tamil comedy drama film

- Poster
- Directed by: D. Sabapathy
- Screenplay by: J. Livingston
- Dialogues by: Sivaram Gandhi
- Story by: J. Livingston; S. Pattoor Selvam
- Produced by: R. B. Choudary
- Starring: J. Livingston; Rambha
- Cinematography: Arthur A. Wilson
- Edited by: J. Shankar
- Music by: Sirpy
- Production company: Super Good Films
- Release date: 12 July 1996
- Running time: 149 minutes
- Country: India
- Language: Tamil

Sundara Purushan (transl. Beautiful Husband) is a 1996 Indian Tamil-language comedy drama film directed by Sabapathy Dekshinamurthy and produced by R. B. Choudary, starring Livingston and Rambha. The film deals with the serious issue of unwilling marriages but with a comical undertone. Livingston also wrote the story and the screenplay for the film. It was released on 12 July 1996. The film was remade in Telugu as Andala Ramudu (2006).

== Plot ==
Ganesan has tremendous love for his maternal cousin Valli right from his childhood, and desires to marry her. Things go wrong for him when his mother dies when he is 8 years old; his father, who is the richest landlord in their village, marries another woman which he dislikes and runs away from home after months of torture from his dad and step-mom. He returns home (to his grandmother) after 17 years for his father's death. He even accepts his brother born to his stepmom.

Ganesan's love for Valli remains unchanged and had returned home after so long time only to win her love and marry her. On the contrary, Valli loves another person Raja, who is a graduate, orphan and also jobless. Her father dislikes this; he lays a condition that he would agree for their marriage only if Raja finds a job.

Ignorant of the fact, but with good intention, Ganesan offers a job to Raja. Later, he learns about the fact and gets despaired. In such a circumstance, Vadivelu resolves to unite his brother with Valli. Vadivelu tactfully implicates Raja in a murder attempt case and sends him to prison on the day of marriage, minutes before the rituals. In such a distressing condition, Valli's father, with no other option remaining, pleads with Ganesan to marry Valli. He readily agrees and marries her.

But Ganesan feels guilty of cheating Valli and keeps distance with her. Valli, although not interested in this wedding, slowly starts liking Ganesan's good character. Three months pass by and one day Valli overhears Ganesan's conversation with his brother and finds out the truth. She gets angry and locks herself in a room. Ganesan tries to convince her but in vain. Ganesan decides to save Raja and informs the truth to police following which Raja is released from prison. Ganesan also convinces Raja to marry Valli promising that there was no relationship between him despite three months of married life. Raja agrees to marry Valli.

As per the village custom, a function is organised where Valli needs to remove her mangalayam tied by Ganesan which will be followed by her wedding with Raja. But Valli vomits before the function which makes Raja suspicious about her relationship with Ganesan. Raja wants the wedding plans to be cancelled. Valli reveals that she pretended to vomit to just check Raja's trust on her. As he has no trust in her, Valli says that Ganesan is the one who really trusts her and loves her truly. Meanwhile, Ganesan attempts suicide by jumping off a waterfall, but is saved by a net placed for cinema shooting, at the bottom. Ganesan and Valli unite in the end.

== Cast ==
- Livingston as Ganesan
- Rambha as Valli
- Vadivelu as Ganesan's foster brother
- Soumyan as Raja
- Vinu Chakravarthy
- Vadivukkarasi
- Madhan Bob
- Mayilsamy
- Pasi Narayanan
- Bayilvan Ranganathan

== Production ==
After portraying a comical negative role in Captain Magal (1993), Livingston gained the confidence that he could write a script starring himself in the lead, as a comical character. He pitched the script of Sundara Purushan to Choudhary, who agreed to fund the film despite objection from distributors.

== Soundtrack ==
The music was composed by Sirpy.

Song	Singers	Lyrics
"Andipatti Ammukutty"	Malgudi Subha, Sujatha, Mano	S. J. Suryah
"Eerakathu"	Febi Mani	Saravana Gnanam
"Marutha Azhagaro"	K. S. Chithra	Vairamuthu
"Raja Rajane"	Sirpy, J. Livingston, Geetha	Kalidasan
"Settapa Mathi"	Suresh Peters, Swarnalatha	S. J. Suryah
"Vennila Vennila"	K. S. Chithra	Saravana Gnanam

== Reception ==
R. P. R. of Kalki wrote Livingston with his acting and writing has completely followed the path of his mentor K. Bhagyaraj while praising his acting and Rambha, Sirpy's music and Wilson's cinematography and concluded that though the film could have had more speed, newness and originality but one cannot deny that this has planted a bright future for Livingston. D. S. Ramanujam of The Hindu wrote, "In a story full of drama, humour and passion, Livingston, playing the full-fledged hero, comes out with flying colours". Arthur A. Wilson won the Tamil Nadu State Film Award for Best Cinematographer.
