= Punnagai Poove =

- DVD cover
- Directed by: Sabapathy Dekshinamurthy
- Screenplay by: Sabapathy Dekshinamurthy
- Story by: R. N. R. Manohar
- Produced by: Kalaipuli S. Thanu
- Starring: Nandha; Rekha Vedavyas; Kaveri
- Cinematography: Suresh Devan
- Edited by: Mu. Kasi Viswanathan
- Music by: Yuvan Shankar Raja
- Production company: V Creations
- Release date: 25 April 2003
- Running time: 140 minutes
- Country: India
- Language: Tamil

Punnagai Poove (transl. Smiling Flower) is a 2003 Indian Tamil-language romantic drama film directed by Sabapathy Dekshinamurthy and written by R. N. R. Manohar, starring Nandha, newcomer Rekha Vedavyas and Kaveri. Vadivelu, Senthil and M. S. Viswanathan appear in supporting roles, whilst actress Sarika, ex-wife of Kamal Haasan, makes a comeback to Tamil films after 17 years, and music composer Yuvan Shankar Raja, who scored the music for this film as well, makes special cameo appearances in the film.

== Plot ==
The story revolves around two best friends, Meera and Nithya with contrasting personalities. Meera is an extrovert while Nithya is an introvert. They have been friends since childhood and work in the IT industry in Chennai. They live as roommates in an apartment community, into which a handsome young man Venkatraman, moves into. As time goes on, Meera is attracted to Venkat when he handles certain issues with his wisdom and good nature. She makes a phone call to appreciate him and eventually, through multiple long telephonic conversations, they become friends. Their friendship blossoms into love without meeting in real life. Nithya understands this development in Meera's relationship status as well.

Venkat becomes impatient with Meera's prolonged elusiveness and plans to meet her in person. He surprises her by walking to her apartment while she is speaking on the phone with him. But at the last minute, Meera gets distracted by another phone call and thrusts the landline phone into Nithya's hands and walks away. Venkat walks into the apartment and mistakes Nithya for Meera and kisses her to express his love and leaves the place. Nithya is shell-shocked and is at a loss of words. Meera is oblivious to all this because the call she received is a family emergency and she leaves to her hometown immediately, without noticing Nithya or Venkat.

Over the next few days, Nithya suffers with fever alone and refuses to attend further calls from Venkat. He decides to visit her, still under the impression that she was the one speaking to him all this while. When he finds out about her fever, he apologises for his behaviour but doesn't listen to her when she tries to tell him about the mistaken identity. He takes good care of her as she recovers, but Nithya is stricken with guilt at her inability to make him understand the truth. Soon, he shocks her once again by introducing her to his family and friends who tell about his good character and that she is lucky to have found Venkat. The same night Venkat proposes Nithya, who is overwhelmed by all the emotions and happiness from well wishers, and is unable to refuse his proposal or reveal the truth. She decides to play along and accept this new turn of events in her life.

When Meera returns from her hometown, Nithya is unable to face her. She tries to confuse Meera telling that Venkat was simply fooling around. Meera refuses to believe Nithya's accusations and challenges that she will continue to wait for Venkat to meet her in person, and express his love for her. Meanwhile, Nithya plants a false impression about Meera to Venkat that she is a possessive friend who is trying to sabotage their relationship, so he must not believe anything Meera tells hereafter. Venkat gets a chance to go abroad for his job and manages to secure a job for Nithya as well. While trying to inform this news and talk about their wedding plans to Nithya, Venkat accidentally meets Meera, who thinks that Venkat is back for her and is on cloud nine, assuming that he really loves her. A harmless conversation makes things worse, and Meera assumes that the wedding plans are for her as well.

Nithya is unable to bear the guilt of betraying both her friend and her fiancé and decides to tell the truth before they marry and leave for the States, when Meera meets with an accident and is critical at the hospital. Nithya confesses everything to an unconscious Meera and swears that she does not want to cheat her and marry Venkat. The day of the wedding arrives and Meera gains consciousness and goes to meet Nithya and Venkat. Nithya is ready to give up Venkat for Meera, but the latter refuses and forgives Nithya and willingly sacrifices her love for her friend. She says that they deserve each other and asks for Nithya's promise to keep this secret between themselves. Nithya and Venkat get married and a few years later we find that Meera has died as an unmarried woman, still holding the memories of her love for Venkat.

== Cast ==
- Nandha as Venkatramanan (Venkat)
- Rekha Vedavyas as Meera
- Kaveri as Nithya
- Vadivelu as Aarumugam
- M. S. Viswanathan as Sachidanandhan
- Senthil
- Achamillai Gopi
- Charle as Sudhakar
- Anumohan
- Singamuthu
- Muthukaalai
- Thyagu as Moneylender
- Shanti Williams as Meera's mother
- Nithya Ravindran as Nithya's mother
- Chitti Babu
- Bayilvan Ranganathan
- Yuvan Shankar Raja (Guest appearance in "En Kadhal")
- Premji Amaran (Guest appearance in "En Kadhal")
- Sarika (Special appearance in "Idhu Innaisaiya")

== Soundtrack ==
The music was composed by Yuvan Shankar Raja. For the first time, he made an appearance in a film, by featuring in and performing one of the songs, "En Kadhal", which was sung by himself as well. One additional song, "Idhu Innisaiya", sung by Bollywood singer Hema Sardesai and Yuvan Shankar Raja, featuring Bollywood actress Sarika on screen, was not included in the soundtrack.

Track listing
No.	Title	Lyrics	Singer(s)	Length
1.	"Venus Venus Pennae"	Palani Bharathi	Devan Ekambaram, Harini, Yuvan Shankar Raja	4:42
2.	"Vaanam Thoovum Poo Mazhaiye"	M. Rathnakumar	Harish Raghavendra, Kovai Ranjani	4:21
3.	"Eno Uyirmele"	Arivumathi	Bhavatharini	2:16
4.	"Jogging Seiyum Caesar"	Pa. Vijay	Pop Shalini	1:55
5.	"Thilaakkaeni Ganaa"	Pa. Vijay	Karthik, Tippu	3:27
6.	"Siragaagi Ponathae"	Arivumathi	Suchitra, Ganga, Kovai Ranjani	1:48
7.	"Oru Poonkili"	Palani Bharathi	Srinivas, Prasanna	4:45
8.	"En Kadhal"	Pa. Vijay	Yuvan Shankar Raja	3:24
Total length:				26:38

== Release and reception ==
The film released on 25 April 2003. Malathi Rangarajan of The Hindu stated, "The story offers nothing new. Tales of unrequited love and mistaken identity have been seen on screen for years now. (The excellently enacted Savithri starrer of yore, "Kathirundha Kangal", and K. Balachander's "Thamarai Nenjam", to name a couple) It is the treatment that makes the difference in Punnagai Poovae." Malini Mannath of Chennai Online wrote, "A love triangle handled with sensitivity, maturity and finesse, the freshness of the cast, and the conviction with which they perform, making the film engaging to watch, despite a common storyline". Visual Dasan of Kalki praised the acting of three lead actors, Sabapathy's direction, Yuvan Shankar Raja's music, natural dialogues and Suresh Devan's cinematography though he found hero fighting many people as small blackmark in spite of that this smiling flower has new fragrance. Cinesouth wrote "Though the story is unraveled very interesting, it fails due to lack of a solid screenplay. That's the film's greatest minus". Sify wrote "Anybody for yet another telephone love story? Since the late 50’s, telephone has been a source of inspiration for Tamil filmmakers for making love stories based on unrequited love and mistaken identity. Punnagi Poovae directed by director Saba Kailash and starring new boy Nandha, Rekha and Kaveri is etched from earlier Tamil stories of the 60’s and 70’s like Sridhar’s classic Kalyana Parissu and K.Balachandar’s Thamarai Nenjam. Here the plot moves at a fairly brisk pace and we get hooked to the proceedings".
