= Hamsanadam =

Janya raga of Carnatic music

- Arohanam: S R₂ M₂ P N₃ Ṡ
- Avarohanam: Ṡ N₃ P M₂ R₂ S

Hamsanadam (pronounced hamsanādam) is a rāgam in Carnatic music (musical scale of South Indian classical music). It is a pentatonic scale (audava rāgam, which means "of 5"), as it is sung in current days. It is a derived scale (janya rāgam), as it does not have all the seven swaras (musical notes), from the 60th Melakarta rāgam Neetimati.

== Structure and Lakshana ==
Hamsanadam scale with shadjam at C

Hamsanadam, as it is sung now-a-days, is a symmetric scale that does not contain gandharam and dhaivatam. It is called an audava rāgam, in Carnatic music classification (as it has 5 notes in both ascending and descending scales). Its ārohaṇa-avarohaṇa structure is as follows (see swaras in Carnatic music for details on below notation and terms):

- ārohaṇa : S R₂ M₂ P N₃ Ṡ (Note: Alternate notations: Hindustani: S R M̄ P N Ṡ; Western: C D F♯ G B C)
- avarohaṇa : Ṡ N₃ P M₂ R₂ S (Note: Alternate notations: Hindustani: Ṡ N P M̄ R S; Western: C B G F♯ D C)

This scale uses the notes shadjam, chatusruti rishabham, prati madhyamam, panchamam and kakali nishadam.

== Other structures ==
Earlier structure of this scale were as follows:

- Ascending scale : S R₂ M₂ P D₃ N₃ Ṡ (Note: Alternate notations: Hindustani: S R M̄ P Ṉ N Ṡ; Western: C D F♯ G A♯ B C)
- Descending scale : Ṡ N₃ D₃ N₃ P M₂ R₂ S (Note: Alternate notations: Hindustani: Ṡ N Ṉ N P M̄ R S; Western: C B A♯ B G F♯ D C)

In the above, shatsruti dhaivatam is added in the scale compared to current usage (shadava scale with 6 notes in ascendinga and descending scale), with a vakra prayoga (zig-zag descending scale).

=== Graha bhedham ===
Hamsanadam's notes when shifted using Graha bhedham, yields three pentatonic rāgams, Gambhiranata, Neela and Bhupalam. Graha bhedham is the step taken in keeping the relative note frequencies same, while shifting the shadjam to the next note in the rāgam. For more details and illustrations of this concept refer Graha bhedham on Gambhiranata.
