= Tamil Nadu State Film Award for Best Editor =

Indian film award

The Tamil Nadu State Film Award for Best Editor is given by the state government as part of its annual Tamil Nadu State Film Awards for Tamil (Kollywood) films.

== The list ==
List of award winners
Year	Recipient	Film
1980	R. Vittal	Murattu Kaalai
1981	Bhaskar	Andha 7 Naatkal
1982	N.R. Kittu	Agni Sakshi
1983	Award not presented	
1984	Award not presented	
1985	Award not presented	
1986	Award not presented	
1987	Award not presented	
1988	B. Lenin	–
1989	T.R. Sekar	Varusham Padhinaaru
1990	Ganesh Kumar	Oru Veedu Iru Vasal
1991	Jayachandran	Maanagara Kaaval
1992	R. Vittal	Pandiyan
1993	Suresh Urs	Thiruda Thiruda
1994	B. Lenin, V. T. Vijayan	Kaadhalan
1995	Udhayakumar	' Makkal Aatchi
1996	Lanci–Mohan	Kadhal Kottai
1997	Thanikachalam	Bharathi Kannamma
1998	M.N. Raja	House Full
1999	Sai Suresh	Unakkaga Ellam Unakkaga
2000	Mohan	Seenu
2001	Kasi Viswanathan	Aalavandhan
2002	V. T. Vijayan	Run
2003	Jaishankar	Arasu
2004	Anthony	Madhurey
2005	Anthony	Ghajini
2006	Suresh Urs	–
2007	Sathissh Kurosowaa	Satham Podathey
2009	Kishore Te	Eeram
2010	B. Lenin	Namma Gramam
2011	Raja Mohammad	Vaagai Sooda Vaa
2012	L.V.K. DASS	Kumki
2013	Leo John Paul	Idharkuthane Aasaipattai Balakumara
2014	A. L. Ramesh	Nimirndhu Nil
2015	Gopi Krishna	Thani Oruvan
