= Bioscope Film Framers =

Indian film company

- Type: Film production Film distribution
- Industry: Entertainment
- Founded: 1992
- Headquarters: Chennai, India
- Key people: R. Parthiban
- Products: Motion pictures (Tamil)

Bioscope Film Framers is an Indian film production and distribution company headed by R. Parthiban.

== History ==
In 1999, during the making of Housefull, Parthieban set up Bioscope Film Framers. He had previously made films with his ex-wife Seetha under the banner of Ammu Movies, but chose to begin a new studio after their separation. Alongside Parthiban, his children Abhinaya, Raakki and Keerthana have also been credited as producers under the banner.

For the making of Kudaikul Mazhai, Parthiepan set up advertisement company called "Gossip" to take care of publicity in the print and electronic media. The studio's next film, Oththa Seruppu, will be the first Tamil film and the second Indian film to feature just a single actor throughout.

== Filmography ==
Title	Year	Language	Director	Cast	Synopsis	Ref.
House Full	1999	Tamil	R. Parthiepan	R. Parthiepan, Roja, Vikram, Suvalakshmi	The film is set around a cinema theatre which is on the verge of being exploded.	
Ivan	2002	Tamil	R. Parthiepan	R. Parthiepan, Meena, Soundarya	The film revolves around a man who crusades against corruption.	
Kudaikul Mazhai	2004	Tamil	R. Parthiepan	R. Parthiepan, Madhumitha, Sriman	After being chased by a girl, he falls in love with her however she announces it as a prank which leads him to develop schizophrenic tendencies.	
Pachchak Kuthira	2006	Tamil	R. Parthiepan	R. Parthiepan, Namitha	The film revolves around heartless and foul-mouthed goon who harasses everyone in the slums.	
Kathai Thiraikathai Vasanam Iyakkam	2014	Tamil	R. Parthiepan	Santhosh Prathap, Akhila Kishore, Sahithya Jagannathan	A group of struggling assistant directors struggle hard to make a film.	
Koditta Idangalai Nirappuga	2017	Tamil	R. Parthiepan	R. Parthiepan, Shanthanu Bhagyaraj, Parvatii Nair	On a business trip to India, an NRI fantasises about getting into a relationship with the young wife of his middle-aged driver.	
Oththa Seruppu Size 7	2019	Tamil	R. Parthiepan	R. Parthiepan		
Iravin Nizhal	2022	Tamil	R. Parthiepan	R. Parthiepan		
