= Tamil Nadu State Film Award for Best Actor =

Indian film award

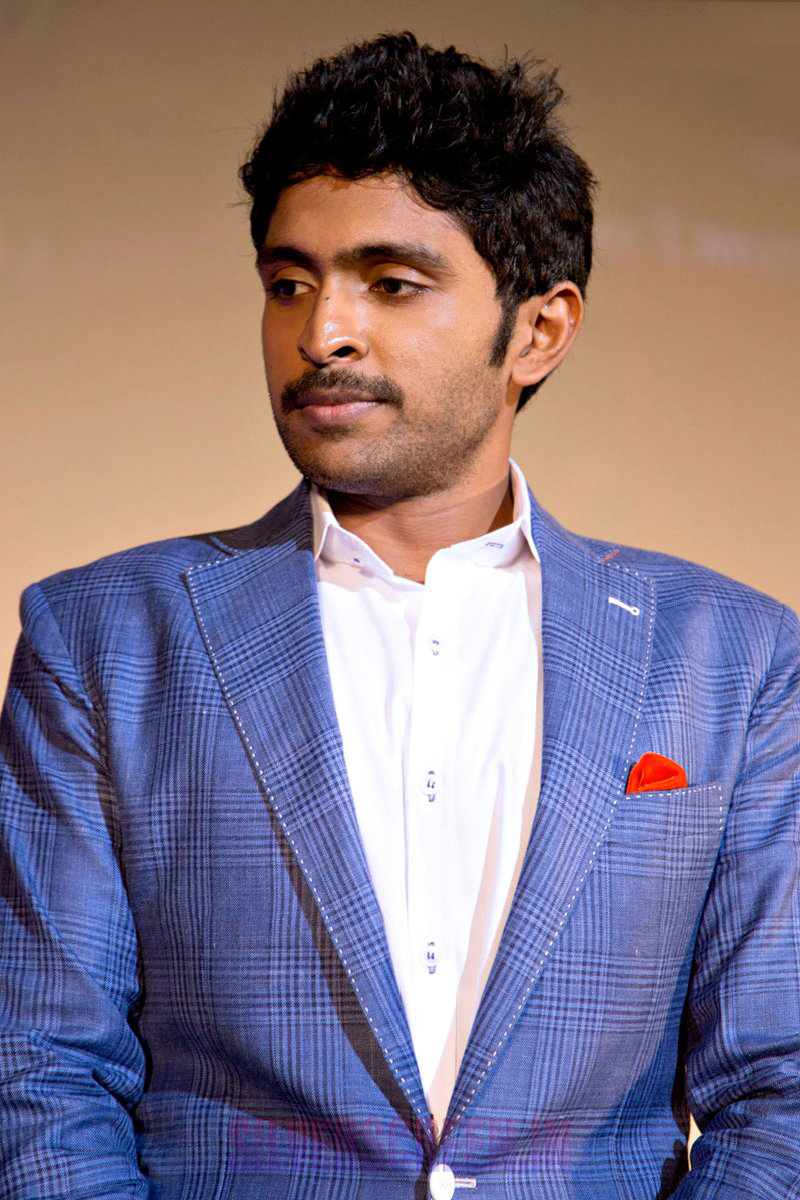
- Latest Winner Vikram Prabhu for Taanakkaran
- Awarded for: Best Performance by an Actor in a Leading Role in Tamil films
- Country: India
- Presented by: Government of Tamil Nadu
- First award: 1967
- Final award: 2022
- Currently held by: Vikram Prabhu for Taanakkaran

The Tamil Nadu State Film Awards for Best Actor is given by the state government as part of its annual Tamil Nadu State Film Awards for Tamil (Kollywood) films.

== List of winners ==
List of winners and nominated work
Year	Recipient(s)	Role(s)	Film(s)	Reference(s)
1967	A. V. M. Rajan	Manikkam	Karpooram	
1968	M. G. Ramachandran	Shekhar & Anand	Kudiyirundha Koyil	
1969	Sivaji Ganesan	Shankar, Kannan & Vijay	Deiva Magan	
1970	Gemini Ganesan	Suresh	Kaaviya Thalaivi	
1977	Kamal Haasan	Gopalakrishnan	16 Vayathinile	
1978	Srikanth	Sivaraman Mudaliar	Karunai Ullam	
1979–80	Sivakumar	Ramu	Avan Aval Adhu	
1980–81	Kamal Haasan	Sundaram Rangan	Varumayin Niram Sigappu	
1981–82	Kamal Haasan	R. Srinivas	Moondram Pirai	
1982	Sivakumar	Aravindhan	Agni Sakshi	
1988	Vijayakanth	Captain Sundarapandian	Senthoora Poove	
1989	Kamal Haasan	Sethupathi, Appadurai & Rajadurai	Apoorva Sagodharargal	
1990	Karthik	Ponnurangam	Kizhakku Vasal	
1991	Prabhu	Chinna Thambi	Chinna Thambi	
1992	Kamal Haasan	Sakthivel	Thevar Magan	
1993	Arjun	Krishnamoorthy	Gentleman	
1994	Sarath Kumar	Shanmugam (Nattamai) & Pasupathi	Nattamai	
1995	Rajinikanth	Zamindar Rajalingam & Muthu Vel	Muthu	
1996	Kamal Haasan	Senapathi & Chandrabose	Indian	
1997 †	Vijay	Jeevaanandham	Kadhalukku Mariyadhai	
1997 †	Parthiban	Bharathi	Bharathi Kannamma	
1998	Sarath Kumar	• Muthaiya & Chinnaiya	• Natpukaaga	
1999	Rajinikanth	Aarupadayappan	Padayappa	
2000	Murali	Karuthaiya	Kadal Pookal	
2001	Suriya	Nandhaa	Nandhaa	
2002	R. Madhavan	• Shiva • Anbarasu • Thiruselvan	• Run • Anbe Sivam • Kannathil Muthamittal	
2003	Vikram	Chithan	Pithamagan	
2004	Jayam Ravi	M. Kumaran	M. Kumaran Son Of Mahalakshmi	
2005	Rajinikanth	Dr. Saravanan / Vettaiyan	Chandramukhi	
2006	Kamal Haasan	DCP Raghavan	Vettaiyaadu Vilaiyaadu	
2007	Rajinikanth	Sivaji	Sivaji	
2008	Kamal Haasan	Rangarajan Nambi, Govindarajan Ramaswamy (Govind), George W. Bush, Christian Fletcher, Shingan Narahazi, Balram Naidu, Avtar Singh, Krishnaveni Paatti, Vincent Poovaraghan, Khalifullah Khan Mukhtar	Dasavathaaram	
2009	Karan	Malayan	Malayan	
2010	Vikram	Veeraiya	Raavanan	
2011	Vimal	Veluthambi	Vaagai Sooda Vaa	
2012	Jiiva	Varun Krishnan	Neethaane En Ponvasantham	
2013	Arya	John	Raja Rani	
2014	Siddharth	Thalaivankottai Kaliappa Bhagavathar	Kaaviya Thalaivan	
2015	R. Madhavan	Prabhu Selvaraj	Irudhi Suttru	
2016	Vijay Sethupathi	Kathir	Puriyatha Puthir	
2017	Karthi	DSP Theeran Thirumaran	Theeran Adhigaaram Ondru	
2018	Dhanush	Anbu	Vada Chennai	
2019	R. Parthiban	Maasilamani	Otha Seruppu Size 7	
2020	Suriya	Nedumaaran Rajangam	Soorarai Pottru	
2021	Arya	Kabilan	Sarpatta Parambarai	
2022	Vikram Prabhu	Arivazhagan	Taanakkaran	

== Multiple Winners ==
Wins	Recipient(s)
8	Kamal Haasan
4	Rajinikanth
2	Sivakumar, R. Sarathkumar, Vikram, Suriya, Madhavan, R. Parthiban, Arya

Kamal Haasan had won most awards for best actor with eight followed by Rajinikanth with four.

== See also ==
- Cinema of India
