= Koditta Idangalai Nirappuga =

2017 Indian film by R. Parthiban

- Theatrical release poster
- Directed by: Parthiban
- Written by: Parthiban
- Produced by: Parthiban Gopi Krishna
- Starring: Parthiban; Shanthanu Bhagyaraj; Parvatii Nair
- Cinematography: Arjun Jena
- Edited by: R. Sudharsan
- Music by: C. Sathya
- Production company: Reel Estate Company
- Distributed by: Bioscope Film Framers
- Release date: 14 January 2017
- Running time: 126 mins
- Country: India
- Language: Tamil

Koditta Idangalai Nirappuga (English: Fill in the blanks) is a 2017 Indian Tamil-language comedy thriller film produced, written and directed by R. Parthiban, which stars himself, Shantanu Bhagyaraj, and Parvati Nair. Featuring music composed by C. Sathya and cinematography by Arjun Jena, the film was released on 14 January 2017.

== Cast ==
- Parthiban as Rangarajan
- Shanthanu Bhagyaraj as Kevin
- Parvathy Nair as Mohini
- Thambi Ramaiah
- Singampuli
- Simran in a guest appearance
- Pooja Ramachandran in a cameo appearance

== Production ==
In May 2013, Parthiban was working on a film script titled Wi-Fi Alla Wife in Malayalam but the film failed to progress after he could not find an apt actress for the lead role. Parthiepan later launched the film in Tamil titled Koditta Idangalai Nirappuga in July 2016 and began shooting for the film immediately alongside Thambi Ramaiah. He stated that the film would be produced through crowd funding, while the title was finalised after consulting an auto driver for his advice. After considering a series of newcomers to play the lead role, Parthiepan announced that Shanthanu Bhagyaraj would play the protagonist and stated that he felt by casting Shanthanu, he was returning a favour to his mentor and Shanthanu's father K. Bhagyaraj. Parvathy Nair was signed as the lead actress and was revealed to be playing a Malayali girl. The team subsequently also brought in actress Simran to play a guest appearance in the film.

== Soundtrack ==
Koditta Idangalai Nirappuga

Soundtrack album by C. Sathya
- Released: 4 December 2016
- Recorded: 2016
- Genre: Feature film soundtrack
- Label: Think Music India
- Producer: C.Sathya

C. Sathya chronology
Unnodu Ka (2016)	Koditta Idangalai Nirappuga (2016)	Bayama Irukku (2017)

During the production of the film, Parthiepan revealed that the melodica would heavily feature in the film to narrate certain sequences. The film's soundtrack was released on 4 December 2016 by Think Music India, at a specially arranged event by the team, which paid respect to K. Bhagyaraj's contribution to the Tamil film industry. Several of Bhagyaraj's erstwhile assistants and admirers including Bharathiraja, K. S. Ravikumar and S. P. Balasubrahmanyam attended the event. Upon release, the soundtrack won acclaim with Behindwoods.com suggesting "Koditta Nirangalai Nirapuga is an out and out classy album where experimentation and new sounding takes a front seat".

Track listing
No.	Title	Lyrics	Singer(s)	Length
1.	"En Oruthiye"	Kabilan	Sreerama Chandra	3:37
2.	"Damukaatlaan Dumukaatalaa"	Logan	T. Rajender	3:12
3.	"Na Re Na"	Madhan Karky	Kharesma Ravichandran	4:11
4.	"Kilukilu Payaai"	R. Parthiepan	Sreerama Chandra	2:42
5.	"Vaa Jannal"	Muthamil	Sriram Parthasarathy	3:39
6.	"Wifeh Lovvu"	R. Parthiepan	Malaysia Ganesan, Bhagyaraj	3:21

== Critical reception ==
A reviewer from The Hindu compared the film to Parthiepan's previous work adding "in KIN, the director makes you wonder why he let his screenplay meander, why his characters lack depth, except for the superb characterisation of Rangarajan, Even though the story is loaded with all elements of an adult comedy and has scope for sensuality, the director deliberately steers clear of the temptation. But sadly, he does not focus on the narrative either". The Times of India wrote "Koditta Idangalai Nirappuga is largely a miss, hitting the right notes only towards the end" suggesting it is "a hedonistic romantic drama with a climactic twist that lacks the zing such a genre-bending film needs". A critic from Sify.com stated Koditta Idangalai Nirappuga "is yet another unique attempt by the film maker like his earlier Kathai Thiraikathai Vasanam Iyakkam (2014)" and that "Parthiepan tries to mix genres to dish out something different" but concludes "it leaves you exasperated".
