= Archana IAS =

- Poster
- Directed by: A. Jagannathan
- Written by: Amudha Durairaj
- Produced by: Amudha Durairaj; Y. Hema Ashok Reddy; Sanayadi Reddy; B. Vedapuri; P. T. S. Sekar; A. P. Srinivasan; D. Delli
- Starring: Sithara; R. Sarathkumar; Siva
- Cinematography: Vipindas
- Edited by: V. P. Krishnan
- Music by: S. A. Rajkumar
- Production company: Deivanai Movies
- Release date: 5 July 1991
- Running time: 130 minutes
- Country: India
- Language: Tamil

Archana IAS is a 1991 Indian Tamil-language political action drama film directed by A. Jagannathan. The film stars Sithara, R. Sarathkumar and Siva, with Janagaraj, Vijayakumar, Srividya, Thalapathy Dinesh, Senthil and Delhi Ganesh playing supporting roles. It was released on 5 July 1991.

== Plot ==
Archana is the daughter of the widow Bhavani, who brought up Archana alone and wanted her daughter to become an IAS officer. Her mother didn't hesitate to physically torture Archana if she disobeyed her rules. Archana was a clever college student, and she won many cups during college. She was friendly with the orphan Kumar and Mala, who was the sister of the college professor Santhosh Kumar. One day, Dinesh killed Mala in front of her brother Santhosh Kumar. The police then arrested Dinesh and the innocent Santhosh Kumar. The following day, Dinesh was released by the police using his father's power.

After that, Archana becomes an IAS Officer, and Siva becomes a police officer. Her mother, Bhavani finally reveals the reason behind her wish to see Archana as an IAS officer. In the past, Bhavani was cheated by Anandamurthy, and he forced her to abort the baby, but she refused and ran away. Archana is now determined to punish her father, Anandamurthy, who is now a powerful and corrupt minister.

== Cast ==
- Sithara as Archana IAS
- R. Sarathkumar as Santhosh Kumar
- Siva as Inspector Kumar
- Janagaraj as Perumalswamy
- Vijayakumar as Anandamurthy
- Srividya as Bhavani
- Thalapathy Dinesh as Dinesh
- Senthil
- Delhi Ganesh as Dinesh's father
- Kumarimuthu
- Oru Viral Krishna Rao
- Sri Lakshmi as Lakshmi
- Yamini as Mala
- M. R. Krishnamurthy as College principal
- Ennatha Kannaiya
- Theni Kunjarammal
- Typist Gopu as Sabesan
- Gundu Kalyanam
- Thideer Kannaiah

== Soundtrack ==
The music was composed by S. A. Rajkumar.

Song	Singer(s)	Lyrics	Duration
"Vaazhkai Enbathu"	Mano, K. S. Chithra	S. A. Rajkumar	4:24
"Araigurai Baashai"	Mano, Anitha Suresh	Na. Kamarasan	5:02
"Unakenavea"	Vani Jairam	Muthulingam	5:00
"Malivu Vilayilea"	S. A. Rajkumar	Na. Kamarasan	4:25
"Naalu Vaarthai"	P. Jayachandran, K. S. Chithra	Vaali	4:37

== Reception ==
The Indian Express wrote, "A few scenes [are] somewhat of an overkill and trifle gimmicky".
