= R. Sudharsan =

- Born: R. Sudharsan; 29 May 1989 (age 36); Chennai, India
- Other name: Vijay Harsan
- Occupation: Film editor

R. Sudharsan (born 29 May 1989) is an Indian film editor, who has worked on Tamil language films. He has often collaborated in ventures involving R. Parthiepan and made his debut through Manivannan's Nagaraja Cholan MA, MLA (2013).

== Career ==
Sudharsan completed a computer science degree at Kumbakonam Sastra University before choosing to move into film-editing by partaking in a course at Loyola College, Chennai.

Sudharsan made his film debut through Manivannan's Nagaraja Cholan MA, MLA (2013) and after the director's death, R. Parthiepan revealed that he would help Sudharsan further his career and gave him the opportunity to edit his next films Kathai Thiraikathai Vasanam Iyakkam (2014) and Koditta Idangalai Nirappuga (2017). Sudharsan has also worked on Zero (2016), where Behindwoods.com praised his work and noted " the editor has done a decent job by mapping together real scenes that are heavily layered with CG work". Regarding his work in Oththa Seruppu, a writer wrote that "Of course, the solo act may have ended as a dud without the editor’s (R Sudarshan) work".

== Filmography ==
=== As editor ===
- Nagaraja Cholan MA, MLA (2013)
- Kathai Thiraikathai Vasanam Iyakkam (2014)
- Zero (2016)
- Koditta Idangalai Nirappuga (2017)
- Dhayam (2017)
- Yemaali (2018)
- Oththa Seruppu (2019)
- Miga Miga Avasaram (2019)
- Iruttu (2019)
- Thatrom Thookrom (2019)
- Iravin Nizhal (2022)
- Echo (2023)
- Web (2023)
