= Thaiyalkaran =

- Poster
- Directed by: S. P. Muthuraman
- Written by: Mahendran
- Produced by: Kalaipuli S. Thanu
- Starring: R. Parthiban; Aishwarya; Saikumar Pudipeddi; Sreeja; Charmila
- Cinematography: T. S. Vinayagam
- Edited by: R. Vittal
- Music by: S. P. Balasubrahmanyam
- Production company: Kalaipuli International
- Release date: 14 January 1991
- Running time: 150 minutes
- Country: India
- Language: Tamil

Thaiyalkaran (transl. Tailor) is a 1991 Indian Tamil-language drama film directed by S. P. Muthuraman, written by Mahendran and produced by Kalaipuli S. Thanu. The film stars R. Parthiban, Aishwarya, Saikumar Pudipeddi, Sreeja and Charmila, with Muralikumar, Chokkalinga Bhagavathar, Vasu Vikram, Dubbing Janaki and Ganeshkar in supporting roles. It was released on 14 January 1991.

== Plot ==
Pandian is a poor tailor, he is a fearless and smart man. He is appreciated by most of the villagers for his bravery. Kaveri is in love with Pandian but Pandian has no feelings for her. Kaveri is the sister of Jayabal, a wealthy rowdy who controls the fish market. Later, Pandian saves many people. He first saves a woman who has been beaten by her alcoholic son. He then saves an old man who was a famous singer in the past, but now suffers from poverty. He then rescues a young girl Lakshmi who was kidnapped by pimps. He then protects a jobless youngster Gopi from drug dealers. Pandian accommodates them in his house. To feed them, Pandian starts working day and night. What transpires next forms the rest of the story.

== Cast ==
- R. Parthiban as Pandian
- Aishwarya as Kaveri
- Saikumar Pudipeddi as Jayabal
- Sreeja as Omana
- Charmila as Lakshmi
- Muralikumar as Inspector Sukumar
- Chokkalinga Bhagavathar as Chokkalinga Bhagavathar
- Vasu Vikram as Gopi
- Dubbing Janaki
- Ganeshkar as Khaja
- Thyagu
- M. R. Krishnamurthy as Nayar
- Suryakanth
- Ajay Rathnam in a guest appearance

== Production ==
Thaiyalkaran was S. P. Muthuraman's second collaboration with Kalaipuli S. Thanu. The film was primarily shot at Nagercoil. For an important elderly character, Chokkalinga Bhagavathar of Veedu fame was chosen for the role.

== Soundtrack ==
The music was composed by S. P. Balasubrahmanyam, with lyrics written by Vaali.

Song	Singer(s)	Duration
"Appaadi Papaali"	S. P. Balasubrahmanyam, S. Janaki	4:41
"Otthaiya Naan"	S. P. Balasubrahmanyam, S. P. Sailaja, Chokkalinga Bhagavathar, G. Prabhu	4:50
"Mai Mai Kannmai"	S. P. Balasubrahmanyam, K. S. Chithra	4:37
"Adichan Thavilu"	S. P. Balasubrahmanyam	5:06
"Ulagam Oru Vaadagai"	S. P. Balasubrahmanyam	4:49

== Reception ==
Sundarji of Kalki said Muthuraman had tried something different, but by forcing many things like love, action and drama, it felt bored watching like a slow moving film from the 1970s. N. Krishnaswamy of The Indian Express wrote, "Parthiban seems to have worked on histrionics. TS Vinayagam handles the camera capably for director SP Muthuraman". According to Muthuraman, the film was neither a commercial nor an art film and ended up being a hotchpotch.

== Bibliography ==
- Muthuraman, S. P. (2017) [2005]. AVM Thandha SPM (in Tamil) (3rd ed.). Vikatan. OCLC 607342391.
