= Padhe Padhe =

- Official poster
- Directed by: R. Nagaraj Peenya
- Produced by: Anand Vijay Kumar
- Starring: Tarun Chandra; Akhila Kishore; Mridula Sathe
- Cinematography: H. S. Ramesh
- Music by: Satish Aryan
- Release date: 14 February 2013
- Country: India
- Language: Kannada

Padhe Padhe (transl. Again and again) is a 2013 Indian Kannada-language romantic drama film directed by R. Nagaraj Peenya and starring Tarun Chandra, Akhila Kishore and Mridula Sathe.

== Cast ==
- Tarun Chandra as Sunny
- Akhila Kishore as Kanchana
- Mridula Sathe as Spoorthi
- Karthik Jayaram
- Veena Sundar as Sunny's mother
- Vijay Kashi as Sunny's father
- Girija Lokesh

== Soundtrack ==
The music is composed by Satish Aryan.

- "Manasaagideyo"
- "Ee Hadina"

== Reception ==
A critic from The Times of India opined that "A good show by debutant director R Nagaraj Peenya who has selected a romantic story with a good script and freshness in narration. It’s a new experience to watch this neat love subject with a difference". A critic from Rediff.com said that "Although the movie cannot be viewed pade pade (again and again), it is a neat and decent entertainer".

== Box office ==
The film ran for fifty days.
