= Deepa Venkat =

Indian Tamil actress

- Born: Deepa Venkat; 11 June 1975 (age 51); Mumbai, Maharashtra, India
- Occupations: Actress; television presenter; radio jockey
- Years active: 1994–Present
- Spouse: Rajagopal
- Children: 2
- Awards: Kalaimamani (2006); JFW Award for Best Dubbing Artist (2019, 2020, 2023)

Deepa Venkat is an Indian actress and dubbing artist. She works as a radio disc jockey at Hello FM Chennai in addition. She has starred in several Tamil films as well as television series.

== Career ==
Deepa made her acting career with the movie Paasamalargal, along with Arvind Swamy, Revathi, Srividya, M. N. Nambiar, and Chinni Jayanth in 1994. She played Jhanvi, in a supporting child artist role.

Growing up in Mumbai, Venkat was fluent in Hindi and this proved to be a blessing when south Indian films began to be dubbed for television in the nineties.

She started her dubbing career in the movie Appu (2000) for Devayani.

She has performed stand-in roles in movies for a number of actresses, including such as Simran, Sneha, Jyothika, Nayanthara, Anushka Shetty, Kajal Aggarwal, Aishwarya Rai Bachchan and other actresses in various films.

Venkat has appeared in several films in supporting roles, and enjoyed a stint in television serials too. But, while she understood the acting process, dubbing came with its own set of challenges.

== Awards ==
Year	Award	Movie	Actress	Result	Citatation
2012	Norway Tamil Film Festival Award for Best Dubbing Artist	Mayakkam Enna	Richa Gangopadhyay	Won	
2012	BIG Salute to Tamil Women Entertainer Award for Best Dubbing Artist	Various films		Nominated	
2019	JFW Award for Best Dubbing Artist	Imaikkaa Nodigal	Nayanthara	Won	
2020	JFW Award for Best Dubbing Artist	Game Over	Taapsee Pannu	Won	
2023	JFW Award for Best Dubbing Artist	Ponniyin Selvan: I	Aishwarya Rai Bachchan	Won	

=== Honours ===
- 2006: Received title of Kalaimamani Award by the Government of Tamil Nadu, which is the highest state honour in the field of Arts.

== Filmography ==
=== Dubbing ===
Year	Movie	Dubbing for	Note	Ref.
2000	Appu	Devayani		
2000	Snehithiye	Manasi Scott		
2000	Kannukku Kannaga	Vindhya		
2000	Main Hoon Rakhwala	Meena	Hindi dubbed version of Telugu film Sneham Kosam	
2001	Shahjahan	Varsha		
2001	Aanandham	Sneha		
2002	Yai Nee Romba Azhaga Irukey	Sneha		
2002	Pesadha Kannum Pesume	Mamtha		
2002	Mitr, My Friend	Preeti Vissa	Hindi	
2002	Kannathil Muthamittal	Simran		
2002	Ezhumalai	Simran		
2002	123	Jyothika		
2002	Ivan	Soundarya		
2002	King	Sneha		
2002	Ramana	Simran		
2003	Ottran	Simran		
2003	Thithikudhe	Shrutika		
2003	Iyarkai	Kutti Radhika		
2003	Thayumanavan	Prema		
2003	Whistle	Gayathri Raguram		
2003	Kovilpatti Veeralakshmi	Simran	For some scenes	
2004	Azhagiya Theeye	Navya Nair		
2004	Maanasthan	Sakshi Shivanand		
2005	Aanai	Sanghavi		
2005	Kana Kandaen	Amritha		
2006	Pasa Kiligal	Navya Nair		
2006	Madrasi	Gajala		
2007	Thavam	Sanjjanaa		
2007	Guru	Vidya Balan	Tamil version only	
2007	Naan Avan Illai	Sneha		
2008	Santosh Subramaniam	Kausalya		
2008	Silambattam	Sneha		
2008	Pandi	Sneha		
2008	Vaaranam Aayiram	Simran	Also dubbed in Telugu dubbed version	
2008	Raman Thediya Seethai	Navya Nair		
2009	TN 07 AL 4777	Simran		
2009	Jaganmohini	Nila		
2009	Thiru Thiru Thuru Thuru	Rupa Manjari		
2009	Naan Avan Illai 2	Raai Laxmi		
2009	Muthirai	Raai Laxmi		
2010	Chikku Bukku	Shriya Saran		
2010	Vandae Maatharam	Sneha		
2010	Rasikkum Seemane	Navya Nair	Tamil	
2011	Urumi	Vidya Balan	Telugu	
2011	Urumi	Nithya Menen	Tamil	
2011	Deiva Thirumagal	Anushka Shetty		
2011	Vedi	Poonam Kaur		
2011	Mayakkam Enna	Richa Gangopadhyay		
2012	Nanban	Anuya Bhagvath	Also dubbed in Telugu dubbed version	
2012	Kadhalil Sodhappuvadhu Yeppadi	Amala Paul		
2012	Oru Kal Oru Kannadi	Sneha		
2012	Thaandavam	Anushka Shetty		
2012	Neerparavai	Nandita Das & Sunaina		
2012	Murattu Kaalai	Sindhu Tolani		
2013	Udhayam NH4	Voice as Manoj Menon's Wife		
2013	Settai	Anjali		
2013	Arrambam	Suman Ranganathan		
2013	Raja Rani	Nayanthara		
2013	Vanakkam Chennai	Sangeetha		
2013	Krrish 3	Kangana Ranaut	Tamil & Telugu versions	
2013	Dhoom 3	Katrina Kaif	Tamil & Telugu versions	
2013	David	Tabu	Tamil version	
2013	Paradesi	Sai Dhanshika		
2013	Kalyana Samayal Saadham	Lekha Washington		
2014	Naan Sigappu Manithan	Lakshmi Menon		
2014	Tenaliraman	Meenakshi Dixit		
2014	Pongadi Neengalum Unga Kadhalum	Athmiya Rajan		
2014	Vetri Selvan	Radhika Apte		
2014	Bang Bang	Katrina Kaif	Tamil only	
2014	Aaha Kalyanam	Simran		
2014	Jilla	Kajal Aggarwal		
2014	Nee Enge En Anbe	Nayanthara		
2015	Vasuvum Saravananum Onna Padichavanga	Muktha		
2015	Rudhramadevi	Anushka Shetty	Also dubbed in Tamil dubbed version	
2015	Inji Iduppazhagi	Anushka Shetty		
2015	Massu Engira Masilamani	Pranitha Subhash		
2015	Puli	Hansika Motwani		
2015	Thani Oruvan	Nayanthara		
2015	Maya	Nayanthara		
2016	Idhu Namma Aalu	Nayanthara		
2016	Oru Melliya Kodu	Manisha Koirala		
2016	Nambiyaar	Sunaina		
2016	Rekka	Lakshmi Menon		
2016	Maalai Naerathu Mayakkam	Wamiqa Gabbi		
2016	Kashmora	Nayanthara	Tamil /Telugu	
2016	Kavalai Vendam	Kajal Aggarwal		
2017	Velaiilla Pattadhari 2	Kajol	Tamil & Telugu versions	
2017	Oru Mugathirai	Aditi Gururaj		
2017	Mersal	Kajal Aggarwal		
2017	Aramm	Nayanthara		
2017	Velaikkaran	Nayanthara		
2017	Cheliyaa	Aditi Rao Hydari	Telugu dubbed version of Kaatru Veliyidai	
2017	Kodiveeran	Shamna Kasim		
2018	Breathe	Shriswara	Web Series Tamil	
2018	Incredibles 2	Evelyn Deavor	Tamil and Telugu	
2018	Chekka Chivantha Vaanam	Jyothika		
2018	Nawab	Jyothika	Telugu	
2018	Imaikka Nodigal	Nayanthara	JFW Award for Best Dubbing Artist	
2018	Ratsasan	Amala Paul		
2018	Puthiya Niyamam	Nayanthara	Tamil version	
2018	Evanukku Engeyo Matcham Irukku	Poorna		
2019	Captain Marvel	Brie Larson	Tamil/ Telugu	
2019	Aladdin	Naomi Scott	Telugu	
2019	Viswasam	Nayanthara	Tamil/ Telugu	
2019	Airaa	Nayanthara	Tamil/ Telugu	
2019	Mr. Local	Nayanthara		
2019	Game Over	Taapsee Pannu	JFW Award for Best Dubbing Artist	
2019	Pakiri	Bérénice Bejo	Tamil dubbed	
2019	A1	Tara Alisha Berry		
2019	Comali	Kajal Aggarwal		
2019	Sye Raa Narasimha Reddy	Nayanthara	Tamil version only	
2019	Oththa Seruppu Size 7	Herself	Psychiatrist named Surya	
2019	Bigil	Nayanthara		
2019	Raatchasi	Jyothika	Except Trailer portion	
2019	Donga	Jyothika	Telugu Version of Thambi	
2019	Mama Jeevana Hethuna	Vidhya Vijay	Short Film	
2019	Terminator: Dark Fate	Mackenzie Davis		
2019	Kaalidas	Ann Sheetal		
2020	Darbar	Nayanthara		
2020	Kannum Kannum Kollaiyadithaal	Ritu Varma		
2020	Mookuthi Amman	Nayanthara		
2021	Nenjam Marappathillai	Regina Cassandra		
2021	Netrikann	Nayanthara		
2021	Annabelle Sethupathi	Taapsee Pannu		
2021	Udanpirappe	Jyothika		
2021	Annaatthe	Nayanthara	Tamil/Telugu	
2022	K.G.F: Chapter 2	Raveena Tandon	Tamil and Telugu Versions Only	
2022	Kaatteri	Aathmika		
2022	O2	Nayanthara		
2022	Captain	Simran		
2022	Oh My Ghost	Sunny Leone		
2022	The Legend	Urvashi Rautela		
2022	Coffee	Iniya	Direct television release on Colors Tamil	
2022	Connect	Nayanthara	Tamil and Hindi Versions	
2022	Kalaga Thalaivan	Nidhhi Agerwal		
2022	Ponniyin Selvan: I	Aishwarya Rai Bachchan	JFW Award for Best Dubbing Artist	
2023	Ponniyin Selvan: II	Aishwarya Rai Bachchan		
2023	Ghosty	Kajal Aggarwal		
2023	Karungaapiyam	Kajal Aggarwal		
2023	Karungaapiyam	Regina Cassandra		
2023	Jawan	Nayanthara	Tamil and Telugu	
2023	Nene Naa	Regina Cassandra		
2023	Soorpanagai	Regina Cassandra		
2023	Paris Paris	Kajal Aggarwal		
2023	The Marvels	Brie Larson	Tamil only	
2023	Iraivan	Nayanthara		
2023	Annapoorani	Nayanthara		
2024	Merry Christmas	Katrina Kaif	In simultaneously shot Tamil version	
2024	Heeramandi	Sonakshi Sinha	Netflix TV series - Tamil and Telugu dubbed versions	
2024	Andhagan	Simran		
2024	Ninaivellam Neeyada	Sinamika		
2024	Hitler	Riya Suman		
2024	His Three Daughters	Carrie Coon	Tamil & Telugu	
2026	Vengeance	Abarnathi		
2026	System	Jyothika	Tamil	
2026	Toxic: A Fairy Tale for Grown-Ups	Nayanthara	Telugu & Hindi	
2026	Vishwanath & Sons	Raveena Tandon	Tamil & Telugu	
2026	Hi	Nayanthara	Tamil	
2026	Sandakari	Shriya Saran	Tamil	
2026	Mookuthi Amman 2	Nayanthara	Tamil & Telugu	

=== As an actress ===
Films

- All films are in Tamil language, Otherwise noted.

Year	Film	Role	Notes
1994	Pasamalargal	Jhanvi	as child artist
1997	Ullaasam	Aditi	
1998	Dhinamdhorum	Susila	
1999	Manasichi Choodu	Vani	Telugu film
2001	Paarthale Paravasam	Rekha	
2001	Dhill	Selvi	
2001	Ullam Kollai Poguthae	Bharathi	
2002	Baba	Shradha	
2002	Sreeram	Kamala	Telugu film; Remake of Dhill
2003	Ramachandra	Deepa	
2004	Kudaikul Mazhai	Venkat's prospective bride	
2007	Malaikottai	RDO's wife	
2008	Jayamkondaan	Aruna	
2008	Saroja	Megha	
2009	Kanden Kadhalai	Anjali's Sister	
2010	Kathai	Kavya's friend	
2010	Vaadaa	Prem's wife	
2026	Ram and Leela	Leela and Ram's mother	Comeback to acting after 16 years
2026	Baththa	Lachamma	

=== Television ===
Year	Title	Role	Channel
1996	Ippadikku Thendral		Sun TV
1996–1998	Kadhal Pagadai	Nandini	Sun TV
1997–1998	Premi	Pooja	Sun TV
1997–1998	Antarangalu	Priya	ETV
1998	Ramany vs Ramany	Lavanya	Sun TV
1998–1999	Aachi international	Manohari	Sun TV
1998-1999	Akshaya	Sushma	Sun TV
1999–2000	Chithi	Viji	Sun TV
2000–2002	Gopuram	Padmini	Sun TV
2002–2004	Annamalai	Jeeva Sakthi	Sun TV
2004–2007	Roja	Sneha and Gayathri (dual role)	Jaya TV
2003–2009	Kolangal	Usha	Sun TV
2004–2005	Agni Pravesam		Jaya TV
2005-2006	Alli Raajiyam	Dr.Nandhini	Sun TV
2005–2010	Geethanjali	Anjali	Raj TV
2006	Sarada	Saradha	Raj TV
2006–2007	Surya	Surya	Sun TV
2006–2007	Kasthuri		Sun TV
2008	Simran thirai	Kokila	Jaya TV
2010	Mythili		Kalaignar TV
2024	Pavithra	Voice-Over for Promo Only	Kalaignar TV
