= Kudaikkul Mazhai =

- Directed by: Parthiban
- Written by: Parthiban
- Produced by: Parthiban
- Starring: Parthiban; Madhumitha
- Cinematography: B L Sanjay
- Edited by: Ram Sudharsan; Suresh Rajan
- Music by: Karthik Raja
- Production company: Bioscope Film Framers
- Release date: 3 September 2004
- Country: India
- Language: Tamil

Kudaikkul Mazhai (transl. Rain in an umbrella) is a 2004 Indian Tamil-language film written, directed and produced by Parthiban. He also stars in the lead role alongside Madhumitha. The film released in September 2004 and was a box office failure.

== Plot ==
Venkat finds himself in a spot when suddenly a young, modern, good-looking Madhumita follows him everywhere, proclaiming her love for him. He knows that she's too big a catch for him and even tells her so, but when she goes on in a romantic vein, he yields to the temptation. And that spells his doom for it has been a charade all along. The shock is too much for the mild mannered Venkat. The affected, cobwebbed mind begins to develop schizophrenic tendencies.

== Cast ==
- Parthiban as Venkat
- Madhumitha as Madhumitha
- Sriman as the police inspector
- Deepa Venkat as Venkat's prospective bride
- Singamuthu as the marriage broker
- Muthukumar (uncredited)

== Production ==
The film was originally titled Nee + Naan (transl. You + Me), though Parthiban chose to rename it Kudaikkul Mazhai (transl. Rain in an umbrella) as the story was about his character's first love and felt that the experience metaphors an experience of rain inside an umbrella. The scenes were shot with a steady cam and 435 cameras, using sophisticated techniques, with scenes usually filmed at night. Many of the scenes were shot at a huge set erected at Pallavaram by art director R K Vijaymurugan. The film was completed with little publicity and promotion, with Parthiban noting he did not want his audience to come to the cinema halls with preconceived ideas about the film.

== Soundtrack ==
The music was composed by Karthik Raja.

Track listing
No.	Title	Lyrics	Singer(s)	Length
1.	"Enga Poi Solluven"	Na. Muthukumar	S. P. Balasubramaniam	05:20
2.	"Oru Kottaikkul"	Na. Muthukumar	Suchitra, Ranjith, Sujatha	05:03
3.	"Adiye Kiliye"	Parthiban	Ilaiyaraaja	02:41
4.	"Onnu Rendu Moonu"	Parthiban	Tippu	05:13
5.	"Pada Pada Vena"	Na. Muthukumar	Karthik	01:04
6.	"Theme Music" (Instrumental)	–		02:40
7.	"Adiye Kiliye (Violin Music)" (Instrumental)	–		02:24
8.	"Kudaikkul Mazhai (Thalattu)" (Instrumental)	–		01:57
Total length:				26:22

== Release and reception ==
Malathi Rangarajan of The Hindu said the film "is a marked deviation from formula fare. Parthiban the creator has slogged to provide a new menu for the audience. And he has, as far as the theme goes." Sify's critic noted "within the commercial format and he has done his best to make a different film". Visual Dasan of Kalki called the film a visual poem and praised Parthiban for breaking the cliches of Tamil cinema. Malini Mannath of Chennai Online wrote "It's a novel experiment in scripting and narrative style as far as Tamil cinema is concerned. A daring attempt by Partibhan as a producer, script-writer-director-hero to experiment with an unusual, hitherto untouched concept by film-makers here: To make the scrip revolve around just two characters, and have just two artistes in the frames for the most part. And to plan the scenes in just two main locations".

The film met with a "cold response" at the box office, with Parthiban believing it was "far ahead of its time". Despite this, Madhumitha's performance was well received and she was offered several Tamil films soon after the release of Kudaikul Mazhai.
