= Engal Swamy Ayyappan =

- VCD cover
- Directed by: Dasarathan
- Written by: Dasarathan
- Produced by: Ramani
- Starring: Dasarathan; Parthiban; Anand Babu; Dilip; Hari Raj
- Cinematography: Saari - Saga
- Edited by: R. Devarajan
- Music by: Dasarathan
- Production company: Deepa Hari Films
- Release date: 28 December 1990
- Running time: 140 minutes
- Country: India
- Language: Tamil

Engal Swamy Ayyappan (transl. Our god Ayyappa) is a 1990 Indian Tamil-language devotional film written and directed by Dasarathan. The film stars Dasarathan, Parthiban, Anand Babu, Dilip, and Hari Raj, while Malaysia Vasudevan, Nagesh, Sindhu, Suryakanth, Anju, and Madhuri play supporting roles. It was released on 28 December 1990.

== Plot ==
An Ayyappan's devotee (Dasarathan) tells five different stories of Ayyappan's miracles to the other devotees.

The first story is about Rajaswamy (Hari Raj). Rajaswamy, an Ayyappan's devotee, is married to Usha (Sindhu) and promises to make a pilgrimage if he gets a job. He finds a job as a car driver. While he is poor and an ardent devotee, his chief (Malaysia Vasudevan) is boastful and disrespectful. Before the pilgrimage, Rajaswamy must arrange a pooja for Ayyappan. His wife sells her jewels to organize the pooja. His chief arranges the same day the pooja with boasting. The lord Ayyappan, as a child, comes in Rajaswamy's chief's house, and the chief insults the lord. Ayyappan comes to Rajaswamy's house, Rajaswamy welcomes with joy and Ayyappan helps him in his pooja. Ayyappan forgives the chief.

The second story is about Swamy (Anand Babu). During his pilgrimage to Sabarimala, someone stole his things. Swamy begins to worship Lord Ayyappan, and an elephant retrieves Swamy's things.

The third story is about Bhaskarswamy (Dilip), who is married to Lakshmi (Anju). He puts the Ayyapan's chain and has to follow a strict vegetarian diet. His arrogant neighbour Sarasu does not care about it; she cooks fish and behaves very arrogantly to everyone. Later, Ayyappan teaches her a lesson, and Bhaskarswamy forgives her for her sin.

The fourth story is about Prasanthswamy, who is married to Gowri (Anju) and has a daughter Saumya. He was the witness of a murder. Some rowdies want to take revenge on him by kidnapping his daughter. In his dream, Ayyappan encourages him to take his daughter with him for the pilgrimage. During the pilgrimage, Saumya gets lost and Salim Bhai (Nagesh), an old Muslim man, returns her to his house. The rowdies hurt Saumya and Salim Bhai's grandson. At the hospital, the doctors needed blood to save the two children, so a Christian man gives his blood and the kids are saved.

The fifth story is about Vasuswamy (Parthiban). When he returns home after the pilgrimage, his father Sivalingam (Raviraj) kicks him and his mother out of his house because Sivalingam has now a concubine. Vasu then finds a job in a butcher shop to make a living. The innocent Vasu is later arrested for killing his father and is sentenced to capital punishment. Before the execution, the real culprit is caught and Vasu is released.

== Cast ==
- Dasarathan
- Parthiban as Vasuswamy
- Anand Babu as Swamy
- Dilip as Bhaskarswamy
- Hari Raj as Rajaswamy
- Malaysia Vasudevan as Rajaswamy's chief
- Nagesh as Salim Bhai
- Sindhu as Usha
- Suryakanth
- Anju as Lakshmi
- Madhuri as Veni
- Kokila as Gowri
- Sivaraman
- Raviraj as Sivalingam
- Kullamani
- Karthik in a guest appearance
- Chiranjeevi (archival footage)

== Soundtrack ==
The soundtrack was composed by Dasarathan, who also wrote the lyrics.

| Song | Singer(s) | Duration |
|---|---|---|
| "Asaiyoda Pooja" | K. J. Yesudas | 5:13 |
| "Emmathamum Sammathamum" | K. J. Yesudas | 4:39 |
| "Sangadam Pokkida" | S. P. Balasubrahmanyam | 3:51 |
| "Swamiyappa Saranam" | Mano | 2:51 |
| "Vanga Vanga Swamigalae" | Paranthaman | 4:20 |
