= Sarigamapadani =

- Poster
- Directed by: R. Parthiban
- Written by: R. Parthiban
- Produced by: Seetha
- Starring: R. Parthiban; Roja; Sangita
- Cinematography: V. Manikandan
- Edited by: P. Saisuresh
- Music by: Deva
- Production company: Abhi Creations
- Release date: 24 August 1994
- Running time: 140 minutes
- Country: India
- Language: Tamil

Sarigamapadani is a 1994 Indian Tamil-language romantic drama film directed by R. Parthiban and produced by Seetha. The film stars Parthiban, Roja and Sangita, with Vijayakumar, Manorama, Vinu Chakravarthy, Chinni Jayanth and Periya Karuppu Thevar playing supporting roles. It was released on 10 February 1994, and failed at the box office.

== Plot ==
Kulasekaran is a liquor shop owner and he likes to spend time in college. Kulasekaran is also a modern Don Juan: a seducer of women. His father Kabali is a drunkard and he was involved in smuggling illegal liquor, while his mother is a soft-spoken person.

During a wedding function, Kulasekaran falls under the spell of the shy young woman Sangita. He talks to Sangita and he tries to seduce her. Sangita really likes his funny way of talking, she eventually falls in love with him and they even talk about their marriage. When Kulasekaran tries to kiss her, she pushes him away. Disappointed by his behaviour, she runs away from the wedding hall.

Later, Kulasekaran falls in love with Archana. Archana is an arrogant college student and she is the daughter of a district collector. Kulasekaran tries to seduce her but without success. One day, she finally accepts his love, unfortunately, the happiness was short-lived, she says that it was just a joke. The whole pattern repeats itself many times, Kulasekaran quickly sinks into alcoholism and depression. Archana openly states that she wants to see Kulasekaran going mad. What transpires later forms the crux of the story.

== Cast ==
- R. Parthiban as Kulasekaran
- Roja as Archana
- Sangita as Sangita
- Vijayakumar as Archana's father
- Manorama as Kulasekaran's mother
- Vinu Chakravarthy as Kabali
- Chinni Jayanth as Kulasekaran's friend
- Periya Karuppu Thevar as Kulasekaran's grandfather
- Vaithi as Headmaster
- Prasanna Kumar as lawyer
- Thalapathy Dinesh

== Soundtrack ==
The music was composed by Deva, with lyrics written by Pulamaipithan.

Song	Singer(s)	Duration
"College Thorandhudichi"	S. P. Balasubrahmanyam	4:57
"Hey Kala Kala"	S. P. Balasubrahmanyam, R. Parthiepan	5:07
"Sarigamapadani"	S. P. Balasubrahmanyam, Deva	4:03
"Aye Vadi Chi Poya"	S. P. Balasubrahmanyam, K. S. Chithra	4:18
"Paithiyam Paithiyam"	Sangeetha Sajith	1:23
"Jinthapath Jinthapath"	S. P. Balasubrahmanyam, R. Parthiepan	4:12
"Poovumilai Pottumilai"	Manorama	2:52
"Ding Dang"	S. P. Balasubrahmanyam, K. S. Chithra	4:51
"Gilli Adichavana"	S. P. Balasubrahmanyam	4:33

== Release and reception ==
Sarigamapadani was released on 24 August 1994. R. P. R. of Kalki found Manikandan's cinematography as the only positive of the film. The film became a box-office failure.
