= Pullakuttikaran =

- Poster
- Directed by: R. Parthiban
- Written by: R. Parthiban
- Produced by: Seetha Parthiban
- Starring: R. Parthiban; Sangita; Urvashi; Prakash Raj
- Cinematography: M. V. Panneerselvam
- Music by: Deva
- Production company: Ammu Movies
- Release date: 14 July 1995
- Running time: 145 minutes
- Country: India
- Language: Tamil

Pullakuttikaran (transl. Family Man) is a 1995 Indian Tamil-language action drama film, written and directed by R. Parthiban. The film stars himself in the lead role, alongside Sangita, while Prakash Raj and Urvashi portray supporting roles along with Malayalam actor Sreenivasan featuring in his first Tamil film. The music for the film was composed by Deva and the film was released on 14 July 1995.

== Plot ==
Parthiban who takes care of orphaned children in a van gets his livelihood by stealing money. Sangeetha falls in love with him after seeing his cleverness in taking money when he pretended to portray a pickpocket in a stage play. Sangeetha ties the sacred thread herself and starts leading her life as Parthiban's wife. Parthiban feels reluctant to accept her as his wife but later relents.

Both have one thing in common with the evil minister (Chandrasekhar). Sangeetha had escaped from the forced marriage to his dim-witted brother (Prakash Raj) who does it to every woman. When Parthiban pretends to help Chandrasekhar in his elections, he changes his money to the other political party and thereby making him lose votes and support. Chandrasekhar who felt cheated joined hands with the opponent political party and killed Parthiban's innocent wife (Urvashi).

In the end, Chandrasekhar searching for Parthiban and Sangeetha, Parthiban kills Chandrasekhar and escapes with his family in a train with the world assuming that he is no more.

== Cast ==
- Parthiban as Veeraiyan
- Sangita as Ammu
- Urvashi as Azhagu
- Prakash Raj
- Chandrasekhar
- Madhan Bob
- Sreenivasan
- Nagesh
- R. S. Shivaji

== Production ==
Karu Palaniappan was introduced as an assistant director through the film, and M. Prabhakaran as art director.

== Soundtrack ==
Soundtrack was composed by Deva and lyrics written by Vairamuthu.

| Song | Singers |
|---|---|
| "Pullakuttikarane" | Shanmugasundari, Suresh Peters |
| "Metti Metti" | S. Janaki, Parthiban, Arunmozhi |
| "Mukkalana Natham" | T. K. Kala, Deva, Swarnalatha, Parthiban |
| "Oru Rajakumari" | S. P. B. Pallavi, Shanmugasundari |
| "Pothum Edutha Jenmame" | Uma Ramanan, Arunmozhi |

== Reception ==
Thulasi of Kalki wrote Parthiban sends home with no tears and no blanket, with a slight sadness. A salute for making me laugh so far. Sir, why we need all the logic!. M. Prabhaharan won the Tamil Nadu State Film Award for Best Art Director.
