= Toronto Tamil International Film Festival =

Toronto Tamil International Film Festival (TTIFF)
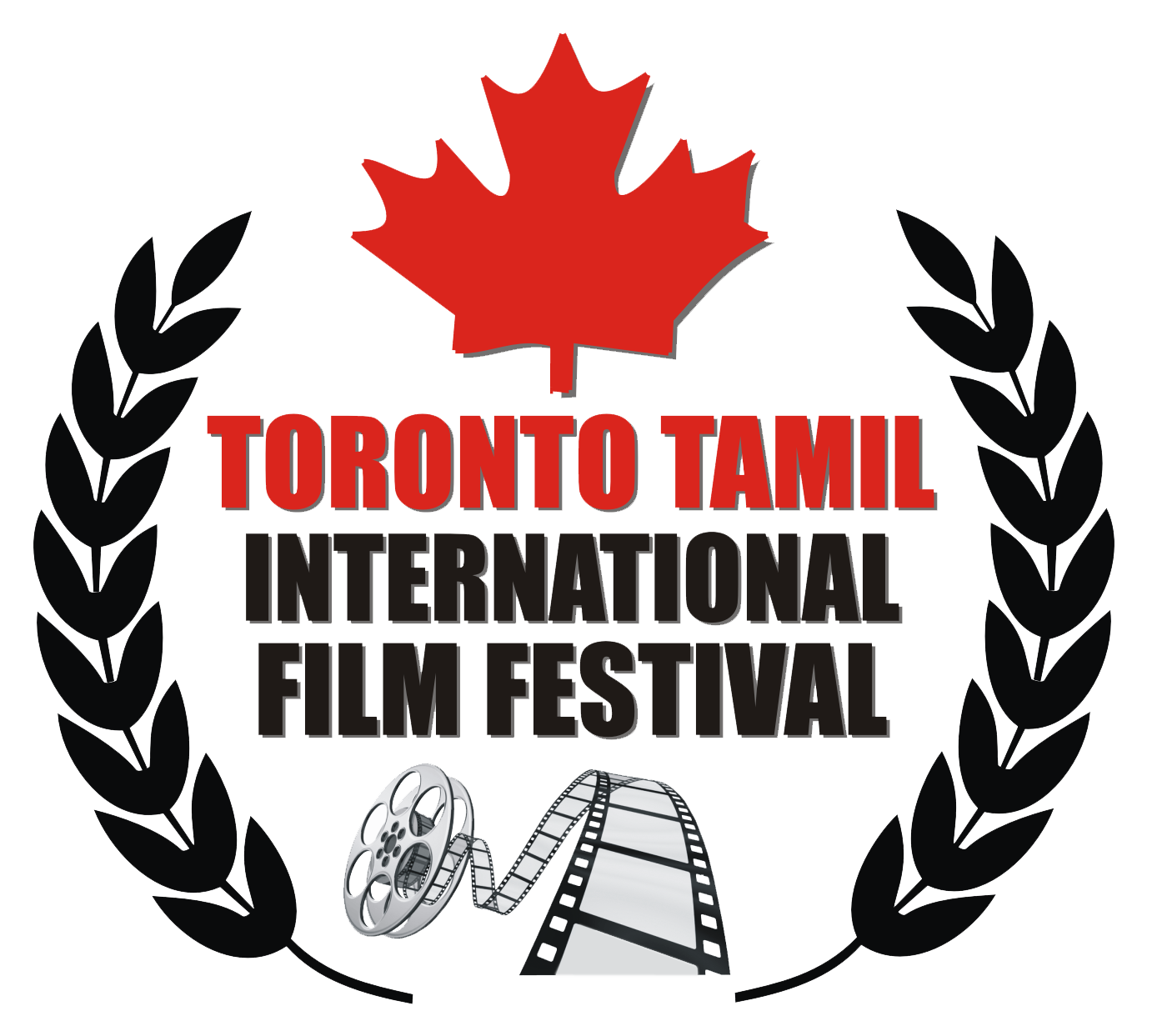
- Location: Toronto, Ontario, Canada
- Founded: 2020
- Language: International
- Website: https://www.ttff.ca/

The Toronto Tamil International Film Festival (TTIFF) is an annual film festival publicly held in Toronto, Ontario, Canada. Its "one of the most significant festival of Tamil films held anywhere outside of Indian subcontinent The Toronto Tamil Film Festival of Toronto (TTIFF) is a nonprofit organization devoted to a greater appreciation of Tamil cinema and culture by showcasing films, supporting emerging filmmakers, and promoting the diverse perspectives of the Tamil diaspora.

Each year the festival features a rich mix of film programs designed to build and support the growing interest in the Tamil entertainment industry. This includes programming that cultivates an audience for Tamil films while supporting filmmakers of Tamil descent in career development as they navigate the larger studio system in Hollywood. TTFFs industry programs include the One-on-One program where film industry professionals from major and independent production and distribution companies are invited to participate in meetings with the TTFF filmmakers; and panel discussions with speakers from the film industry.

== 2020 Awards ==
=== Jury Award ===
- Jury Award Best Feature Film: Oththa Seruppu Size 7 (Director / Producer R. Parthiban)
- Jury Award Best Feature Film Director: Radhakrishnan Parthiban (Oththa Seruppu Size 7)
- Jury Award Best Feature Film Women Director: Halitha Shameem (Sillu Karuppatti)
- Jury Award Best Experimental Feature Film: Sillu Karuppatti (Director: Halitha Shameem)
- Jury Award Best Trans-Themed Feature Film: Coffee Cafe (Arunkumar Senthil)
- Jury Award Best Crime Thriller Feature Film: Pulanaivu (Director: Shalini Balasundaram)
- Jury Award Best Feature Documentary Film: The Lamp of Truth (Director: Thanesh Gopal)
- Jury Award Best Short Film Director: Anand Murthy (சினம் (Sinam))
- Best Solo Act Award: Radhakrishnan Parthiban (Oththa Seruppu Size 7)

=== Audience Award ===
- Audience Award Best Feature Film: Kanni Maadam (Director: Bose Venkat)
- Audience Award Best Short Films: Kaadaaru (Director: Calis Peter Xavier)
- Audience Award Best Short Films: Hunter Maniyam (Director: Mathi Sutha)
- Audience Award Best Long Short Films: Female (Director: Karthik Siva)

=== Special Jury Award ===
The Outstanding Performance is given for the following films.

- Rising Star Emerging Director: Mathi Sutha (Hunter Maniyam)
- Rising Star Emerging Actress: Sutharshi Ignatius (Irai)
- Best Short Film: Flood (Director: Sivalingam Vimalrajh)
