= Pachakuthirai =

- Title card
- Directed by: R. Parthiban
- Written by: R. Parthiban
- Produced by: Abhi; Keerthi; Rakki
- Starring: R. Parthiban; Namitha
- Cinematography: P. Selvakumar
- Edited by: R. K. Udhayakumar
- Music by: Sabesh–Murali
- Production company: Bioscope Film Framers
- Release date: 14 April 2006
- Country: India
- Language: Tamil

Pachakuthirai (Note: Alternatively spelt as Pachcha Kuthirra. The additional I in "Pachakuthirai" is not pronounced.) is a 2006 Indian Tamil-language film written and directed by R. Parthiban. It stars himself and Namitha. The film's title refers to the Tamil name for the children's game known as Leapfrog. It was released on 14 April 2006 coinciding with Tamil New Year.

== Plot ==
Pachchamuthu, by his own confession, is a ruffian, and due to the fear he whips up, he rules over a slum area in Chennai. He is a sadist, a pervert, and he treats his own mother like a slave worker and swears at her. He is always on the lookout to make a quick buck and has no qualms about doing dirty jobs for others, provided he is paid.

One day, Pachcha walks into a marriage pandal and peeps into the female dressing room through a hole. He sees the rich and fair-looking bride-to-be Poovu removing her clothes. After seeing her completely nude, intensely aroused by her voluptuous body, Pachcha plans to have sex with her one way or the other. He beats up the groom, convinces the people there, and eventually marries the poor girl. After returning to his slum with her, he continually subjects her to his sexual whims and fancies.

Poovu, however, turns out to be a kind woman who sympathizes with the slumdwellers who are terrified of Pachcha. One day, Pachcha decides to test the colony people's loyalty by pretending to be dead. However, he is shocked to see the entire population in the place celebrating his death – except his mother. This changes him completely. Pachcha renounces his ways and breaks up the gang of ruthless moneylenders. The villagers celebrate.

== Cast ==
- R. Parthiban as Pachchamuthu
- Namitha as Poovu
- Maaran as Pachchamuthu's friend
- Latha Rao as Vadivu, Pachchamuthu's mother
- Rajkamal as Bridegroom, who was supposed to marry Poovu, was beaten by Pachchamuthu
- Kadhal Dhandapani as Moneylender
- Vinod Raj as Headmaster
- T. P. Gajendran as Advocate Varadharajan
- Liaquat Ali Khan
- Chitra Lakshmanan as the mayor's PA
- G. V. Sudhakar Naidu as GV, manufacturer of adulterated food products
- Jyothi Lakshmi
- Bonda Mani as Bonda

== Soundtrack ==
Soundtrack was composed by Sabesh–Murali with lyrics by Parthiban.

Track listing
No.	Title	Singer(s)	Length
1.	"Thalamela Thookrom"	Aravind
2.	"Sarasa Loga"	Karthik, Chinmayi, Suchithra, Pop Shalini, Vindhya
3.	"Sangu Thaarai"	R. Parthiban
4.	"Pottu Vechi"	M. J. Shriram, Mahathi
5.	"Pachaya Pachaya"	Malathi, M. J. Shriram
6.	"Adadadi Ganja Chedi"	M. J. Shriram

== Reception ==
Malini Mannath of Chennai Online wrote, "A fare that is nauseating, gross and sleazy, an unforgivable assault on the senses. And more than the perversion of the character, what jolts you is the scripting and presentation that is totally devoid of sensitivity and sensibility". Malathi Rangarajan of The Hindu criticised the film for its verbosity, but added, "Parthiban plays his part(s) in typical fashion. He is more effective when he silently goes about serving the needy. Namita does what is expected of her". Lajjavathi of Kalki felt the first half was nauseating but called the second half as bright.

G. Ulaganathan of Deccan Herald wrote, "The movies in a way reminds us of his first film as hero, Puthiya pathai. He essays his role with utmost ease. But the surprise is Namitha who, in the second half, shows how she can perform as an actress given a good script. While the movie has everything to give you a fulsome entertainment, the climax is quite abrupt and even childish--two villains shooting each other at pointblank range while the hero ducks their bullets!". Sify wrote, "On the whole, Pachakuthirai is sure delight to audience who love crude, crass and risqué films with lot of double entendre".
