= Ulle Veliye =

- Poster
- Directed by: Parthiban
- Written by: Parthiban
- Produced by: Seetha
- Starring: Parthiban; Aishwarya; Shenbagam
- Cinematography: M. V. Panneerselvam
- Edited by: Ganesh
- Music by: Ilaiyaraaja
- Production company: AC Abi. Creations
- Release date: 16 April 1993
- Running time: 130 minutes
- Country: India
- Language: Tamil

Ulle Veliye (transl. Inside Outside) is a 1993 Indian Tamil-language crime film directed by Parthiban and produced by Seetha. The film stars Parthiban, Aishwarya and Shenbagam. It was released on 16 April 1993. The film proved to be a successful venture at the box office in spite of its vulgar scenes and double-entendres. It was remade in Hindi as Mr. Azaad (1994).

== Plot ==
Gajendran is a small-time crook who lives in a slum. In the past, his father was a labourer and a communist activist. His superior killed his father, and his innocent mother Rajalakshmi was sent to jail for her husband's murder. Gajendran was then born in jail. Being born in jail, he is treated as a crook by society and he decides that if that is what they want him to be, he will be one. He will do anything for money. Gajendran takes the IPS exam as a joke, cheats and passes it. He becomes a police officer again cheating his way through the training and other aspects but then takes bribes from everyone, even the poor. He is reformed when one of the honest constables, on the day of retirement, loses his life trying to stop a jail break which he could have easily ignored. On the same day, anti-corruption officers raid Gajendran's house and find a lot of money there. At the court, Shenbagam, who is deeply in love with Gajendran, decides to save him, so she lies to the judge that she was a prostitute and had earned a lot of money. She then commits suicide. This reforms him and makes him realise that all actions have consequences.

Thereafter, he falls in love with the police officer Meena. Later, MLA Muthulingam burns Gajendran's slum to collect some votes. Gajendran marries Meena and finally decides to fight against the corruption and in the end, kills them all unable to render justice legally.

== Cast ==
- Parthiban as R. Gajendran alias Gaja
- Aishwarya as Meena
- Shenbagam as Shenbagam
- Rajeev as Muthulingam
- R. N. Sudarshan as Rajarathnam
- Thalapathi Dinesh
- Captain Raju
- Sabitha Anand as Rajalakshmi
- Vennira Aadai Moorthy as Constable
- Silk Smitha
- Dakshayini as Selvi
- MRK
- Oru Viral Krishna Rao as Constable
- Mannangatti Subramaniam as Constable
- Thideer Kannaiah
- Joker Thulasi
- Karuppu Subbiah
- Azhagu

== Production ==
According to Parthiban, his so-called clean film Sugamana Sumaigal (1992) was rejected by audiences, prompting him to make the more vulgar Ulle Veliye to compensate for the losses incurred from the previous film.

== Soundtrack ==
The soundtrack was composed by Ilaiyaraaja, with lyrics written by Vaali, Gangai Amaran and Pulamaipithan. For the Telugu-dubbed version Allari Donga, all lyrics were written by Rajasri.

Tamil version

Song	Singer(s)	Lyrics	Duration
"Aariraaro Paadum Ullam"	Ilaiyaraaja	Pulamaipithan	3:10
"Kalathanamaha"	K. S. Chithra, Mano	Gangai Amaran	4:49
"Kandupidi Neethaaney"	S. P. Balasubrahmanyam, S. Janaki	Vaali	5:06
"Sakkara Katti"	S. P. Balasubrahmanyam, S. Janaki	Vaali	5:09
"Solli Adikkirathu"	Mano	Vaali	4:55
"Uttalakadi Uttalakadi"	S. P. Balasubrahmanyam	Vaali	4:58

Telugu version

Song	Singer(s)	Duration
"Chinna Chinna Mata"	S. P. Balasubrahmanyam, K. S. Chithra	5:10
"Jajimalli Nene"	S. P. Balasubrahmanyam, S. Janaki	5:19
"Ginginakadi"	S. P. Balasubrahmanyam	5:10
"Jola Paata"	S. P. Balasubrahmanyam	3:34
"Veera Kottudulo"	S. P. Balasubrahmanyam, S. Janaki	5:06
"Jaali Jaali"	Chorus	4:58
"Chakkani Janta"	S. P. Balasubrahmanyam, S. Janaki	5:19

== Reception ==
The Indian Express wrote, "Parthiban gives a good account of himself and as a director and story writer too he has excelled but as a dialogue writer he has gone overboard with the double entendres and conceived situations which are obscene".

== Impact ==
Parthiepan said in 2019 that the Telugu film Temper (2015) was in fact lifted from Ulle Veliye; nevertheless, he decided not to file a lawsuit as he only wanted to alert fans and make them compare both films.
