= Sugamana Sumaigal =

- DVD cover
- Directed by: R. Parthiban
- Written by: R. Parthiban
- Produced by: Seetha
- Starring: R. Parthiban; Shali
- Cinematography: M. V. Panneerselvam
- Edited by: M. N. Raja
- Music by: Chandrabose
- Production company: Isswariyan Pictures
- Release date: 21 February 1992
- Running time: 140 minutes
- Country: India
- Language: Tamil

Sugamana Sumaigal (transl. Comfortable burdens) is a 1992 Indian Tamil-language drama film written and directed by R. Parthiban. The film stars himself and Shali. It was released on 21 February 1992, and failed at the box office.

== Plot ==
Moorthy, a young man, had to work hard for his big family. An LIC agent falls in love with him. The rest of the story is on how he helped his family from the misery.

== Cast ==
- R. Parthiban as Moorthy
- Shali
- Anu Manickam
- Radha Ravi as Thangaraj
- Shanthi Anandraj
- Vijayakumar as a police officer
- Sridevi Vijaykumar as Babu
- Renuka as Kalyani
- Idichapuli Selvaraj
- Typist Gopu
- Film News Anandan
- Diamond Babu
- Kutty Padmini in a guest appearance
- Poornam Viswanathan in a guest appearance

== Soundtrack ==
The soundtrack was composed by Chandrabose, with lyrics written by Pulamaipithan and Vairamuthu.

Song	Singer(s)	Duration
"Bajanai Pazhakkamilla"	S. P. Balasubrahmanyam	5:21
"Chinnapattam Poochi"	Mano, K. S. Chithra	4:23
"Kudagu Malaikaadu"	K. J. Yesudas	5:00
"Super Super"	S. P. Balasubrahmanyam	4:25
"Vambula Mattivudadhinga"	S. P. Balasubrahmanyam	5:03

== Reception ==
N. Krishnaswamy of The Indian Express wrote, "Sugamaana Sumaigal's narrative is a bit disjointed, and director Parthiban isn't able to convey what he wants to with his cinematic style, but then, he picks up the camera and bravely wants to write a story with it". C. R. K. of Kalki played on the film's title and called it "Sogamana Sumaigal" (Sad burdens). According to Parthiban, the "clean" film was rejected by audiences, prompting him to make the more vulgar Ulle Veliye (1994) to compensate for the losses incurred from this film.
