= Ivan (2002 film) =

- DVD cover
- Directed by: Parthiban
- Written by: Parthiban
- Produced by: Abi; Keerthi; Rakki
- Starring: Parthiban; Meena; Soundarya
- Cinematography: Fowzia Fathima
- Edited by: M. N. Raja
- Music by: Ilaiyaraaja
- Production company: Bioscope Film Framers
- Release date: 23 August 2002
- Running time: 145 minutes
- Country: India
- Language: Tamil

Ivan (/ɪvən/ transl. Him) is a 2002 Indian Tamil language film directed, written and produced by Parthiban. The film stars him along with Meena and Soundarya (in her penultimate Tamil film). Meena won the Tamil Nadu State Film Award for Best Actress.

== Plot ==
Jeevan (Parthiban) is a tempo driver and a socially conscious middle-aged man who wants to clean up the society. His motivation is his late father (Thalaivasal Vijay) who was murdered as he tried to be a crusader. Jeevan is intelligent enough to realise that he is not a one-man-army to fight the evils and corruption in society. He therefore motivates the public to fight for their rights. He lives in a small place with four friends and together they do what little they can to improve the condition around. The Carnatic singer Dheetchanya (Soundarya) has a silent admiration for Jeevan. But, a Telugu woman Meena Kumari (Meena) wins him over and forces him into marriage by telling a lie that she has cancer, but she dies during a fireshot. Thereafter, Jeevan brings the villains all together and each of them gets a chance to support his stand and speak on the circumstances which forced them to take to crime. Jeevan gives a long lecture and transforms them into being good citizens. At last, It is shown that Jeevan is leaving the court with Dheetchanya.

== Cast ==
- Parthiban as Jeevan
- Meena as Meena Kumari, Jeevan's Wife
- Soundarya as Dheetchanya, a carnatic singer (voice-dubbed by Deepa Venkat)
- Anandaraj as "Diesel" Raj
- Nizhalgal Ravi as Kathiresan
- Kitty as Seth
- Devan
- FEFSI Vijayan as Police inspector
- Thalaivasal Vijay as Jeevan's Father
- B. V. Balaguru
- Mahanadi Shankar as Rowdy
- Bala Singh as Politician
- S. V. Ramadas
- Rowdy Rathnam
- M. S. Bhaskar as Meena Kumari's father
- Gandhimathi as Slum dweller
- Manochithra as Dikshanya's mother
- Subhashini as Meena Kumari's mother
- Anuradha as Lady pimp
- C. R. Saraswathi as Drug dealer
- Theni Kunjarammal as Slum dweller
- Vandana as Janani
- Reena Reddy
- Baby Prithivi as Valli
- Senbhaga Muthu as Slum dweller
- Singamuthu as Singamuthu
- Nellai Siva as Slum dweller
- Ooty Mani as Slum dweller
- Kanal Kannan as Rowdy
- Dubbing Venkat
- Thalapathy Dinesh as Counterfeiter
- Idichapuli Selvaraj as Swamy
- T. P. Gajendran as Politician
- Vetri Vigneshwar as Adult film producer
- Benjamin
- Veera Raghavan
- Set Govindaraj as Slum dweller
- Y. S. D. Sekhar as Slum dweller
- C. Duraipandian as Lawyer
- Kovai Senthil as Demonstrator
- Vijay Ganesh as Ration shop worker
- Raaghav as Journalist (uncredited role)
- Preetha as Preetha (uncredited role)
- Hemalatha as Teenage girl
- Srilatha as Government employee
- Abhinayashree in a special appearance
- Subbudu as himself (cameo appearance)

== Production ==
Music critic Subbudu made his cinematic debut appearing as himself.

== Soundtrack ==
The soundtrack was composed by Ilaiyaraaja. Copies of the audio were sold via paper bags as Parthiban opposed the use of plastic for environmental concerns.

| Song | Singers | Lyrics | Length |
|---|---|---|---|
| "Appadi Pakrathuna" | Mathangi, P. Unnikrishnan | Palani Bharathi | 05:55 |
| "Bhajanai Seivom" | S. N. Surendar, Arunmozhi, Febi Mani | Ilaiyaraaja | 01:03 |
| "Ennai Yenna Seithai Vengulalae" | Sudha Ragunathan | Vaali | 06:18 |
| "Enakkinai Yaar" | Sudha Ragunathan | Muthulingam | 01:09 |
| "Kannan Nee En" | Sudha Ragunathan | Muthulingam | 04:51 |
| "Male Toppula" | Karthik, Malgudi Subha | Kabilan | 04:40 |
| "Pattukku Pogathinga" | Arunmozhi | Ilaiyaraaja | 00:47 |
| "Thoolu Thoolu" | Karthik, Sujatha | Na. Muthukumar | 04:43 |
| "Ulagame Nee" | Palakkad Sreeram | Mu. Metha | 05:03 |

== Reception ==
Malathi Rangarajan of The Hindu wrote, "Parthepan deserves applause for avoiding irksome duets in foreign locations and incongruous song sequences that do not jell with the story. Also he has very astutely done away with a comedy track that could hang loose. On the whole Parthepan reveals rare expertise in "Ivan". All these make one wonder why after a good beginning he should change tack and follow the beaten path". Malini Mannath of Chennai Online wrote, "Ivan is off-beat, interesting for the most part, a little sermonising, and monotonous, confusing at times. But it showcases Partibhan as a thinking actor-director who has it in him to rise above the mundane and mediocre, if he seriously puts his mind to it". Cinesouth wrote, "In the first half, the screenplay shines. But, Ivan begins to fumble when Parthiban attempts heroisms in the second half".
