= House Full (1999 film) =

- Theatrical release poster
- Directed by: R. Parthiban
- Written by: R. Parthiban
- Produced by: Abinaya; Keerthana; Raaki
- Starring: R. Parthiban; Vikram; Roja; Suvaluxmi
- Cinematography: M. V. Panneerselvam
- Edited by: M. N. Raja
- Music by: Ilaiyaraaja
- Production company: Bioscope Film Framers
- Release date: 15 January 1999
- Running time: 138 minutes
- Country: India
- Language: Tamil

House Full (Note: Alternatively spelt as Housefull.) is a 1999 Indian Tamil-language thriller film written and directed by R. Parthiban. The film stars himself along with Vikram, Roja and Suvaluxmi. It was produced by Parthiban's children under Bioscope Film Framers. The score was composed by Ilaiyaraaja.

House Full was released on 15 January 1999. It won the National Film Award for Best Tamil Feature Film, and two Tamil Nadu State Film Awards: Best Director (Parthiban) and Best Editor (M. N. Raja).

== Plot ==
Ayya is a respected man who runs a cinema theatre. The story begins when bombs are placed inside the theatre during a movie. The police commissioner and DGP want to defuse the bombs without letting the audience know. Hameed is one of the people in the theatre, and Indhu is the woman outside who loves him.

Ayya's ex-wife does not help when she makes a tear-filled request to him to evacuate the theatre, against the police's advice. By the time Ayya makes a decision, however, Indhu has already snuck in and warned Hameed. Others, hearing her words, begin to run out of the theatre. Panic ensues as everyone makes a mad dash for the door.

Ayya helps the audience exit the theatre without caring for his own life. Finally when everyone is evacuated, Ayya also comes out of the theatre. Suddenly, the sound of a baby crying is heard inside the theatre. Ayya rushes into the theatre with the hope of saving the baby, but the sound is just a scene in the movie that was actually getting played. Unfortunately, the bomb explodes and Ayya dies.

== Cast ==
- Parthiban as Ayya
- Vikram as Hameed
- Roja as Writer
- Suvalakshmi as Indhu
- Aishwarya as Christine
- Swathi as Stella
- Jayanthi as Ayya's estranged wife
- Vadivelu as Vadivelu
- Nair Raman as Theatre manager
- Surya as Police Commissioner (voice dubbed by Thalaivasal Vijay)
- Laxmi Rattan as Director General of Police
- S. V. Ramadas as Security Guard
- Rowdy Rathnam as Rathnam
- Baby Sujitha
- Mayilsamy as Indigenous man
- Bhanusri as Indigenous woman
- J. Prabhakar
- Senbhaga Muthu
- Kalidoss as Thamizh
- D. R. K. Kiran as Journalist (uncredited role)
- Karu Pazhaniappan as Journalist (uncredited role)
- Cheran Raj as Police officer (uncredited role)
- Pasupathy as Corrupt cop (uncredited role)
- Priyanka as Control room operator (uncredited role)

== Production ==
Parthiban revealed in a 2019 interview with Baradwaj Rangan that he made this film without a written script. Everything from dialogues, shots, etc., was done on the day of the shooting at shooting site. The film was predominantly shot at Sridevi theatre at Madurai. Parthiban planned to shoot there only for two weeks; however he bought the theatre for lease and completed filming within seven weeks. The film's ending was shot on a theatre set at Prasad Studios where a miniature was also created.

== Reception ==
K. N. Vijiyan of New Straits Times opined that "Catch this film if you are looking for a story with a difference". A critic from Deccan Herald wrote "Housefull is awfully silly, and seems to serve no other purpose than to show Parthiban, as being capable of political authority". Kalki praised Parthiban for attempting a Speed kind of thriller in Tamil. D. S. Ramanujam of The Hindu appreciated the film's theme and Parthiban's getup for seeming "new" to Tamil cinema, "But the amount of tension such a yarn is supposed to generate is sadly missing in his screenplay and narration based on his story, making it a damp squib". Nonetheless, he appreciated Panneerselvam's cinematography, M. N. Raja's editing and R. K. Nagu's art direction.

== Accolades ==
House Full won the National Film Award for Best Tamil Feature Film at the 46th National Film Awards. It also won two Tamil Nadu State Film Awards: Best Director (Parthiban) and Best Editor (M. N. Raja).

== See also ==
- List of Indian films without songs
