= Dada Is Back =

2017 Indian Kannada crime drama film

- Directed by: Santhosh
- Written by: Santhosh
- Produced by: Paramesh; Dr. Shankar; Deepthi Madhavan
- Starring: R. Parthiepan; Arun Kumar; Ajay Raj Urs; Shravya
- Cinematography: Nagesh Acharya
- Music by: Anoop Seelin
- Production companies: Apple Films; Dayanand Sounds
- Release date: 21 July 2017
- Country: India
- Language: Kannada

Dada Is Back is a 2017 Indian Kannada crime film directed by Santhosh and starring Tamil actor-director R. Parthiepan, making his debut in Kannada cinema, alongside Arun Kumar, Ajay Raj Urs, and Shravya. The film's score and soundtrack are composed by Anoop Seelin whilst the cinematography is by Nagesh Acharya.

The film was released across Karnataka on 21 July 2017.

== Cast ==
- R. Parthiepan as Tippu
- Arun Kumar as Chikka
- Ajay Raj Urs
- Shravya
- Sudharani
- Sharath Lohitashwa as Delli
- Raghava Uday

== Production ==
This marks the second collaboration between Santhosh, Ajay Raj Urs and Arun Kumar after Gombegala Love (2013).

== Soundtrack ==
Dada Is Back

Soundtrack album by Anoop Seelin
- Recorded: 2017
- Genre: Feature film soundtrack
- Label: Divo

Anoop Seelin composed the film's background and scored for its soundtrack. The soundtrack album consists of five tracks, including one theme song.

Track listing
No.	Title	Artist(s)	Length
1.	"Open the Bottle"	Vyasaraj Sosale	04:07
2.	"Mallige Mellage"	Vijay Yesudas, Vinay Shetty	03:51
3.	"Cycle Gappal Love Aytu"	Naveen Sajju	04:16
4.	"Ee Bhoomi Mele Illa"	Vijay Prakash	04:29
5.	"Dada is Back theme"	Anoop Seelin	03:10

== Reception ==
The Times of India reviewed the film giving 3 stars out of 5 and remarked that the film is for "those who like tales revolving crime and underworld. Though, it doesn't provide as much action one would expect from an underworld film".
