= Kolagalam =

2013 Indian film by P. G. Surendran

- Theatrical release poster
- Directed by: P. G. Surendran
- Written by: P. G. Surendran
- Produced by: P. G. Surendran
- Starring: Amal; Saranya Mohan
- Cinematography: K. S. Selvaraj
- Edited by: Suresh Urs
- Music by: Bharani
- Production company: PGS Film International
- Release date: 13 December 2013
- Running time: 139 minutes
- Country: India
- Language: Tamil

Kolagalam (transl. Chaos) is a 2013 Indian Tamil-language romantic comedy drama film directed by P. G. Surendran, starring Amal and Saranya Mohan. The film was released on 13 December 2013.

== Cast ==
As per the film's opening credits

- Amal as Amal
- Saranya Mohan as Ramya
- Ganja Karuppu
- Pandiarajan as Venkatesh
- Manobala as Roadside stall owner
- Devadarshini as Ramya's sister-in-law
- Meera Krishnan as Ramya's mother
- Lakshmi as Krishu
- Vietnam Veedu Sundaram as Ramya's grandfather
- V. K. R. Rahu
- Vishwanth as Pathmanabhan
- Nellai Siva
- Thalapathy Dinesh as Traffic Police Inspector (special appearance)

== Soundtrack ==
The music is composed by Bharani.

Song	Lyrics	Singer(s)
"Minda Disturb"	Bharani	Mano
"Kannula Unna"	Viveka	Sriram Parthasarathy, Sumithra
"Sema Sema"	Viveka	Karthik
"Yelaea Yelae"	Viveka	Anuradha Sriram, Mukesh

== Reception ==
A critic from The New Indian Express wrote that "The director probably wanted to highlight women-power, but that hardly registers. Kolakalam hardly has anything to entice a viewer". A critic from Dinakaran praised the comedy scenes and felt that the music and cinematography were average. In a more positive review, a critic from Dinamalar wrote that "All in all, if the first half had been a blast, Kolakalam would have been a blast!!"
