= Thalapathy Dinesh =

Indian choreographer (born 1963)

- Born: Dinesh; 17 May 1963 (age 63); Tamil Nadu, India
- Occupations: Actor; action choreographer; stunt co-ordinator
- Years active: 1985–present
- Honours: Kalaimamani 2020

Thalapathy Dinesh (also spelled Thalapathi Dinesh) is an Indian action choreographer who works mainly in Tamil cinema. He started his career in the cinema as an extra fighter in Naan Sigappu Manithan, and later he became a stunt master and actor. Stunt masters like Stun Silva, Peter Hein, Anal Arasu, Rajasekhar, Hari Dinesh, Pradeep Dinesh, Supreme Sundar, Vicky, and Theeppori Nithya have worked as fighters and assistants to him. His sons Hari Dinesh and Pradeep Dinesh are also stunt masters.

== Filmography ==
=== Fight Master ===
Films

- 1994 Sarigamapadani
- 1995 Muthu Kaalai
- 1995 Marumagan
- 1995 Maa Manithan
- 1996 Kizhakku Mugam
- 1996 Poovarasan
- 1996 Parivattam
- 1997 Sishya
- 1998 Sundara Pandian
- 1998 Pooveli
- 1999 Nilave Mugam Kaattu
- 1999 Rojavanam
- 1999 Unakkaga Ellam Unakkaga
- 1999 Unnaruge Naan Irundhal
- 1999 Aasaiyil Oru Kaditham
- 2000 Sandhitha Velai
- 2000 Kannan Varuvaan
- 2000 Kuberan
- 2000 Unnai Kann Theduthey
- 2000 Seenu
- 2001 Ullam Kollai Poguthae
- 2001 Thaalikaatha Kaaliamman
- 2001 Sri Raja Rajeshwari
- 2001 Asathal
- 2001 Lovely
- 2001 Azhagana Naatkal
- 2002 Shakalaka Baby
- 2002 Game
- 2003 Kalatpadai
- 2003 Unnai Charanadaindhen
- 2003 Winner
- 2003 Indru
- 2004 Jai
- 2004 Shock
- 2004 Giri
- 2004 Oru Murai Sollividu
- 2005 Devathayai Kanden
- 2005 London
- 2005 Thaka Thimi Tha
- 2005 Chandramukhi
- 2005 Naran (Malayalam)
- 2005 Chinna
- 2005 Sivakasi
- 2005 Vanakkam Thalaiva
- 2006 Paramasivan
- 2006 Kovai Brothers
- 2006 Thirupathi
- 2006 Thalai Nagaram
- 2006 Kusthi
- 2006 Nee Venunda Chellam
- 2006 Rendu
- 2006 Thagapansamy
- 2006 Adaikalam
- 2007 Kalakkura Chandru
- 2007 Adavadi
- 2007 Naan Avanillai
- 2007 Parattai Engira Azhagu Sundaram
- 2007 Veerappu
- 2007 Thottal Poo Malarum
- 2007 Arya
- 2007 Pasupathi c/o Rasakkapalayam
- 2007 Thavam
- 2008 Pazhani
- 2008 Thangam
- 2008 Thotta
- 2008 Vambu Sandai
- 2008 Sandai
- 2008 Kathavarayan
- 2008 Aayudham Seivom
- 2008 Kuselan
- 2008 Panchamirtham
- 2009 Padikathavan
- 2009 Thee
- 2009 Enga Raasi Nalla Raasi
- 2009 Guru En Aalu
- 2009 Manjal Veiyil
- 2009 Ainthaam Padai
- 2009 Anthony Yaar?
- 2009 Azhagar Malai
- 2009 Arumugam
- 2009 Mathiya Chennai
- 2010 Kutty
- 2010 Aasal
- 2010 Thambikku Indha Ooru
- 2010 Guru Sishyan
- 2010 Kola Kolaya Mundhirika
- 2010 Pen Singam
- 2010 Vaadaa
- 2010 Aarvam
- 2010 Vallakottai
- 2010 Nagaram Marupakkam
- 2010 Aattanayagann
- 2011 Bhavani
- 2011 Mappillai
- 2012 Ullam
- 2012 Sooriya Nagaram
- 2012 Kalakalappu
- 2013 Thillu Mullu
- 2013 Theeya Velai Seiyyanum Kumaru
- 2013 Ya Ya
- 2013 Chithirayil Nilachoru
- 2013 Vidiyum Munn
- 2013 Kolagalam
- 2014 Ninaithathu Yaaro
- 2014 Amara
- 2014 Uyirukku Uyiraga
- 2014 Sooran
- 2014 Aranmanai
- 2014 Kalkandu
- 2014 Vilaasam
- 2015 Ivanuku Thannila Gandam
- 2015 Kamara Kattu
- 2015 Sakalakala Vallavan
- 2015 Pokkiri Mannan
- 2015 Athiradi
- 2016 Aranmanai 2
- 2016 Hello Naan Pei Pesuren
- 2016 Muthina Kathirikai
- 2016 Aasi
- 2016 Meen Kuzhambum Mann Paanaiyum
- 2016 Kannula Kaasa Kattappa
- 2017 Shivalinga
- 2017 7 Naatkal
- 2017 Thiri
- 2017 Katha Nayagan
- 2017 En Aaloda Seruppa Kaanom
- 2018 Kalakalappu 2
- 2018 Utharavu Maharaja
- 2020 Velvet Nagaram
- 2021 Aranmanai 3
- 2023 Katradhu Mara
- 2023 Chandramukhi 2
- 2024 Petta Rap

Television

- 2005 Malargal
- 2009 Dhaayam
- 2015 J
- 2017 Nandini

=== Actor ===
Films

- 1989 Uthama Purushan
- 1990 Pudhu Padagan
- 1990 Pondatti Thevai
- 1990 Nadigan
- 1990 Mallu Vetti Minor
- 1991 Archana IAS
- 1991 Sami Potta Mudichu
- 1991 Vetri Padigal
- 1991 Pudhu Manithan
- 1991 Thalapathi
- 1992 Enga Veetu Velan
- 1992 Killer (Telugu)
- 1992 Nadodi Pattukkaran
- 1992 Idhu Namma Bhoomi
- 1992 Mappillai Vanthachu
- 1992 Kizhakku Veedhi
- 1993 Ejamaan
- 1993 Ulle Veliye
- 1993 Uzhaippali
- 1993 Vedan
- 1993 Athma
- 1993Rajadurai
- 1993 Chinna Jameen
- 1993 Enga Muthalali
- 1993 Mechanic Alludu (Telugu)
- 1993 Repati Rowdy (Telugu)
- 1993 Airport
- 1994 En Rajangam
- 1994 Adharmam
- 1994 Seeman
- 1994 Sarigamapadani
- 1994 En Aasai Machan
- 1994 Thai Maaman
- 1995 Baashha
- 1995 Rani Maharani
- 1995 Muthu Kaalai
- 1995 Marumagan
- 1995 Asuran
- 1995 Periya Kudumbam
- 1995 Muthu
- 1996 Kizhakku Mugam
- 1996 Poovarasan
- 1996 Dominic Presentation
- 1997 Kaalamellam Kaathiruppen
- 1997 Arunachalam
- 1997 Sishya
- 1997 Once More
- 1997 Periya Manushan
- 1997 Ratchagan
- 1998 Sundara Pandian
- 1998 Kannedhirey Thondrinal
- 1998 Simmarasi
- 1998 Karnataka Police (Kannada)
- 1998 Kottaram Veettile Apputtan (Malayalam)
- 1998 Pooveli
- 1999 Periyanna
- 1999 Rajasthan
- 1999 Nenjinile
- 1999 Nilave Mugam Kaattu
- 1999 Rojavanam
- 1999 Malabar Police
- 1999 Sneha (Kannada)
- 1999 Unakkaga Ellam Unakkaga
- 1999 Unnaruge Naan Irundhal
- 1999 Aasaiyil Oru Kaditham
- 2000 Thirunelveli (uncredited)
- 2000 Sandhitha Velai
- 2000 Kannan Varuvaan
- 2000 Kuberan
- 2000 Unnai Kann Theduthey
- 2000 Seenu
- 2000 Manu Needhi
- 2001 Vaanchinathan
- 2001 Ullam Kollai Poguthae
- 2001 Rishi
- 2001 Thaalikaatha Kaaliamman
- 2001 Sri Raja Rajeshwari
- 2001 Dosth
- 2001 Asathal
- 2001 Lovely
- 2001 Narasimha
- 2001 Azhagana Naatkal
- 2002 Shakalaka Baby
- 2002 Ivan
- 2002 Game
- 2002 Style
- 2003 Ramachandra
- 2003 Kalatpadai
- 2003 Kutumba (Kannada)
- 2003 Diwan
- 2003 Unnai Charanadaindhen
- 2003 Winner
- 2003 Indru
- 2004 Jai
- 2004 Gambeeram
- 2004 Shock
- 2004 Giri

 2004 BLACK (MALAYALAM)

- 2004 Oru Murai Sollividu
- 2005 Devathayai Kanden
- 2005 London
- 2005 Thaka Thimi Tha
- 2005 Chandramukhi
- 2005 Naran (Malayalam)
- 2005 Chinna
- 2005 Sivakasi
- 2005 Vanakkam Thalaiva
- 2006 Paramasivan
- 2006 Kovai Brothers
- 2006 Thirupathi
- 2006 Thalai Nagaram
- 2006 Kusthi
- 2006 Nee Venunda Chellam
- 2006 Rendu
- 2006 Thagapansamy
- 2006 Adaikalam
- 2007 Kalakkura Chandru
- 2007 Adavadi
- 2007 Naan Avanillai
- 2007 Parattai Engira Azhagu Sundaram
- 2007 Veerappu
- 2007 Thottal Poo Malarum
- 2007 Arya
- 2007 Pasupathi c/o Rasakkapalayam
- 2007 Thavam
- 2007 Police Story (Kannada)
- 2008 Pazhani
- 2008 Thangam
- 2008 Thotta
- 2008 Vambu Sandai
- 2008 Sandai
- 2008 Kathavarayan
- 2008 Aayudham Seivom
- 2008 Kuselan
- 2008 Kathanayakudu
- 2008 Ellam Avan Seyal
- 2008 Panchamirtham
- 2009 Padikathavan
- 2009 Thee
- 2009 Enga Raasi Nalla Raasi
- 2009 Guru En Aalu
- 2009 Manjal Veiyil
- 2009 Gnabagangal
- 2009 Ainthaam Padai
- 2009 Azhagar Malai
- 2009 Arumugam
- 2009 Mathiya Chennai
- 2010 Aasal
- 2010 Thambikku Indha Ooru
- 2010 Guru Sishyan
- 2010 Kola Kolaya Mundhirika
- 2010 Pen Singam
- 2010 Vaadaa
- 2010 Vallakottai
- 2010 Nagaram Marupakkam
- 2010 Aattanayagann
- 2011 Bhavani
- 2011 Mappillai
- 2012 Ullam
- 2012 Sooriya Nagaram
- 2012 Kalakalappu
- 2013 Thillu Mullu
- 2013 Theeya Velai Seiyyanum Kumaru
- 2013 Ya Ya
- 2013 Chithirayil Nilachoru
- 2013 Vidiyum Munn
- 2013 Kolagalam
- 2014 Ninaithathu Yaaro
- 2014 Amara
- 2014 Adhu Vera Idhu Vera
- 2014 Aadama Jaichomada
- 2014 Uyirukku Uyiraga
- 2014 Sooran
- 2014 Aranmanai
- 2014 Kalkandu
- 2014 Vilaasam
- 2015 Aambala
- 2015 En Vazhi Thani Vazhi
- 2015 Ivanuku Thannila Gandam
- 2015 Kamara Kattu
- 2015 Sakalakala Vallavan
- 2015 Pokkiri Mannan
- 2015 Athiradi
- 2016 Aranmanai 2
- 2016 Hello Naan Pei Pesuren
- 2016 Muthina Kathirikai
- 2016 Tamilselvanum Thaniyar Anjalum
- 2016 Aasi
- 2016 Meen Kuzhambum Mann Paanaiyum
- 2016 Kannula Kaasa Kattappa
- 2017 Shivalinga
- 2017 7 Naatkal
- 2017 Thiri
- 2017 Katha Nayagan
- 2017 En Aaloda Seruppa Kaanom
- 2017 Guru Uchaththula Irukkaru
- 2018 Kalakalappu 2
- 2018 Utharavu Maharaja
- 2019 Vantha Rajavathaan Varuven
- 2020 Naan Sirithal
- 2020 Velvet Nagaram
- 2020 Irandam Kuththu
- 2021 Pei Mama
- 2021 Aranmanai 3
- 2023 Thalaikkavasamum 4 Nanbargalum
- 2023 Chandramukhi 2
- 2024 Petta Rap

Television

- 2003 Lollu Sabha
- 2004 Ahalya
- 2010 Thendral
- 2016 Vamsam
- 2019 Chocolate
- 2024–present Gowri

== Extra fighter ==
- 1985 Naan Sigappu Manithan
- 1988 Unnal Mudiyum Thambi
- 1987 Per Sollum Pillai
- 1987 Oorkavalan
- 1987 Annanagar Mudhal Theru
- 1987 Vairakkiyam
- 1988 Jeeva
- 1988 Thaai Paasam
- 1988 Soora Samhaaram
- 1988 Poovizhi Raja
- 1988 Pattikaatu Thambi
- 1988 Dhayam Onnu
- 1988 Nallavan
- 1988 Kaliyugam
- 1988 Orkkapurathu
- 1989 Rajadhi Raja
- 1989 Apoorva Sagodharargal
- 1989 Vettaiyaadu Vilaiyadu
- 1989 Padicha Pulla
- 1989 Dharma Devan
- 1989 Varam
- 1989 En Thangai
- 1989 Annanukku Jai
- 1989 Chinnappadass
- 1989 Vetri Vizha
- 1989 Vetri Mel Vetri
- 1990 Ulagam Pirandhadhu Enakkaga
- 1990 Athisaya Piravi
- 1990 Avasara Police 100
- 1991 Maanagara Kaaval
- 1992 Amma Vanthachu
- 1992 Suyamariyadhai
- 1993 Karpagam Vanthachu

== Awards and nominations ==
- 1999 Tamil Nadu State Film Award for Best Stunt Coordinator - Pooveli
- 2003 Tamil Nadu State Film Award for Best Stunt Coordinator - Winner & Unnai Charanadaindhen
