= Thaalikaatha Kaaliamman =

2001 film by R. Somasunder

- Directed by: R. Somasunder
- Written by: R. Somasunder; P. Kalaimani (dialogues)
- Produced by: P. Kannappan Yadav
- Starring: Prabhu; Kausalya; Sanghavi
- Cinematography: Babu
- Edited by: K. R. Ramalingam
- Music by: Sirpy
- Production company: Sundar theatres
- Release date: 16 February 2001
- Running time: 140 minutes
- Country: India
- Language: Tamil

Thaalikaatha Kaaliamman is a 2001 Indian Tamil-language Hindu devotional film written and directed by R. Somasunder. The film stars Prabhu, Kausalya and Sanghavi. The film, produced by P. Kannappan Yadav, was released on 16 February 2001.

== Plot ==
Bose and his cousin Pandi come to a village to discover the miracles of the village's Goddess.

In the past, Abirami, a young woman drowned in the village pond. The whole village then thinks that she had done some wrong for which Goddess had punished her. The village's Nattamai ordered Abirami's family to leave the village immediately, her husband refused to perform her last rites and abandoned his little daughter. The child was brought up by Kamachi, the Nattamai's wife. Thereafter, the village became unpopular, arid and the villagers left the village one by one.

Now, Abhirami's daughter, Karpagam has grown up. Karpagam's uncle, a rowdy, wants to steal her things but Bose saves her. The villagers force Karpagam to do a cruel thing. As there is drought in the village, the villagers want Karpagam to be made as a dead body and take her around the village, so that it rains. To protect her, Bose decides to marry her but the villagers refuse. The village's Nattamai tells what happened really : Abirami was in fact killed by Maruthu, Nattamai's son, and Nattamai concealed it. Later, Goddess punished them: Maruthu died while Nattamai became physically ill. Bose marries Karpagam and the villagers apologise to Karpagam.

Bose returns to his house with his wife. Even though Bose married her secretly, his father Dharmalingam blesses them and he prepares their wedding reception. At his first night, Bose finds Ramya instead of Karpagam in his room and she declares herself to be the woman he married. So Bose asks to his father who is Ramya and he tells the past.

Raghavan, a police officer, was transferred to their city and he became Dharmalingam's family friend. Ramya, Raghavan's daughter, met Bose in numerous places and she developed a soft corner for him. Raghavan arrested Bose in a misunderstanding and he released him immediately. Raghavan was subsequently suspended and wanted to take revenge on Bose and Dharmalingam. Bose and Ramya finally fell in love with each other. They got married secretly with Dharmalingam and Paandi's help. Raghavan shot Bose with his gun and kidnapped his daughter. Bose tries to save Ramya with bullet wound, but ends up with an accident. Bose is survived but forgot his past. Since this incident, Dharmalingam had no information about Ramya.

So Bose leaves his house with Karpagam and Paandi. They move into their guest house, there he sees again Ramya who wants to live with him. Later, Bose meets Ramya's mother who is now lost her husband and she tells what happened to Ramya and Raghavan. After kidnapping Ramya, Raghavan tried to take of her thaali, but she committed suicide. A few days later, Raghavan died in shock.

Ramya's spirit now wants to fulfill her wish of living with Bose by taking over Karpagam's body. But Goddess comes to help Karpagam. Finally Ramya realizes her mistake and leaves. Bose and Karapagam unite in the end.

== Cast ==
- Prabhu as Bose
- Kausalya as Karpagam
- Sanghavi as Ramya
- Pandiarajan as Paandi
- Manivannan as Dharmalingam, Bose's father
- Bhanupriya as Kaliamman (guest appearance)
- Rajan P. Dev as Raghavan
- Vennira Aadai Nirmala as Lakshmi
- Alex as Nattamai
- Manorama as Kamachi, Nattamai's wife
- Thalapathy Dinesh as Ranjith
- Indhu as Karpagam's mother, Abirami
- Jyothi Lakshmi
- Vennira Aadai Moorthy
- Mansoor Ali Khan
- Suryakanth
- Baby Aishwarya as Karpagam (child)

== Production ==
The film is directed by R. Somasunder who has also penned the story and the screenplay. Somasunder has earlier wielded the megaphone for films like Engal Kula Deivam, Uyir, and Amman Koil Thiruvizha. The dialogue is written by Kalaimani. Sirpi sets the tune to lyrics written by Kalidasan, Pazhnibharathi, Kalaikumar, Vijay and Ravishanker. Editing is by K. R. Ramalingam, work by Kalai, and stunt choreography by Dalapathy Dinesh. A shooting stint took place at Rekha House, Saidapet, where a scene was picturised on Prabhu, Kousalya, Sanghavi and Manivannan. The film was produced by Sriyadav of Sunder Theatres, producers of such films as Ulavali and Pass Mark.

== Soundtrack ==
The music composed by Sirpy.

No.	Song	Singers	Lyrics
1	"Kanavil Patha"	K. S. Chithra	R.Ravishankar
2	"Laser Kathir Pole"	P. Unnikrishnan, Anuradha Sriram	Palani Bharathi
3	"Mela Satham"	Hariharan, Sujatha	KalaiKumar
4	"Sun TV"	S. P. Balasubrahmanyam, K. S. Chithra	Pa.Vijay
5	"Vatta Vatta Paaraiyila"	Malgudi Subha	Kalidasan

== Reception ==
Chennai Online wrote "It is an old-style treatment that reminds one of films of yore. But mercifully there are no voyeuristic scenes nor puerile comedy track. The early part of the film is interesting and a fine twist is given to the story when Ramya enters the scene. But the latter part is insipid and predictable". Another critic wrote "lot of special effects make the film tolerable for the level headed, but the film is strictly for those who like sentimental stuff." Indiainfo wrote "Director Somasundareswar starts off the film as an amman film turns into a story of police excess and then into a story of ghost and finally ends up glorifying the kali god leaving the viewer hung in midair like its hero Prabhu hung in midair by the evil spirits".
