= Pondatti Thevai =

- Poster
- Directed by: Parthiban
- Written by: Parthiban
- Produced by: A. Sundaram
- Starring: Parthiban; Ashwini
- Cinematography: K. Rajpreeth
- Edited by: M. N. Raja
- Music by: Ilaiyaraaja
- Production company: Vivek Chithra International
- Release date: 14 April 1990
- Running time: 150 minutes
- Country: India
- Language: Tamil

Pondatti Thevai (transl. Wife needed) is a 1990 Indian Tamil-language film written and directed by Parthiban. The film stars himself and newcomer Ashwini. Produced by A. Sundaram, it was released on 14 April 1990.

== Plot ==
Kannan, a bus conductor, falls in love with Shanthi, a Brahmin girl. After seeing Shanthi answering in a TV interview in which the anchor asks questions regarding marriage and married life, Kannan tells his colleague Naidu, that he wants to marry Shanthi.

One day, he spots Shanthi boarding the bus, she loses her pass and he helps her when a checking inspector questions her. He tries to woo her and she reciprocates his feelings. He enters into Agraharam and to Shanthi's house disguised as beggar to see her. Shanthi also visits his home and tries to cook non-vegetarian food. Kannan takes her to a pawn broker shop and retrieves the thaali of his dead mother. In the past Kannan didn't have money to study so his mother mortgaged her thaali for him. But unfortunately she became sick and died. He couldn't even take a picture of her, since the photographer was busy clicking photos of another girl.

Shanthi's attraction to him grows. The news of this relationship reaches Shanthi's father Sankar. Some of the hooligans led by Dinesh try to harass Shanthi and the bus passengers. Kannan later fights them. One day Kannan convinces Shanthi to come to the temple so that they can wed without the knowledge of Shanthi's parents. But Shanthi does not go.

Kannan is frustrated and tries to reason with her, but she humiliates him. He tries to talk to her in her workplace, but she refuses to talk to him and he is ejected. Frustrated, he consumes alcohol and drives the bus with passengers into the Agraharam and stops at Shanthi's house. In vain, he tries to reason with her mother Kamala and Shanthi. He creates a scene in the Agraharam. Kannan is suspended due to this actions.

Sindhu, Kannan's neighbour visits Shanthi and views Shanthi talking to a doctor in a park. She misunderstands the situation and tells Kannan that Shanthi will marry the doctor. He tries to create a ruckus in the Agraharam. The Agraharam people prepare a petition which results in Kannan losing his job. One day Kannan is involved in an accident and Sindhu cares for him.

He utters Shanthi's name while sleeping. Sindhu tries to talk to Shanthi and understands that when Shanthi decided to go to the temple to marry Kannan, her father revealed that she had a weak heart and would be unfit for married life. The doctor was actually the one who would perform surgery on Shanthi as a last chance. Kannan heard about this and rushes to the hospital. He ties the thaali around her neck and says that she will be his wife in any circumstances. Shanthi enters the operating room as the credits roll.

== Cast ==
- Parthiban as Kannan
- Ashwini as Shanthi
- Sindhu
- MRK as Naidu
- Ra. Sankaran as Sankar
- Kamala Kamesh as Kamala
- Dubbing Janaki as Kannan's mother
- Kumarimuthu as Kumari Muthu
- Idichapuli Selvaraj
- Thalapathy Dinesh
- Keyaar
- Pasi Narayanan

== Soundtrack ==
The music was composed by Ilaiyaraaja, with lyrics written by Vaali, Pulamaipithan, Gangai Amaran, Piraisoodan and Ilaiyaraaja.

Song	Singer(s)	Lyrics	Length
"Aararo Paada"	K. S. Chithra, Arunmozhi	Gangai Amaran	5:02
"Amma Naan"	Malaysia Vasudevan	Piraisoodan	5:30
"Enathu Raagam"	S. Janaki, Arunmozhi	Pulamaipithan	4:34
"Ladies Special"	Chorus	Ilaiyaraaja	0:20
"Thottavudan"	K. S. Chithra	Vaali	1:00
"Varuga Varuga"	Chorus	Ilaiyaraaja	0:21
"Yaaradi" (Female)	K. S. Chithra	Ilaiyaraaja	4:55
"Yaaradi" (Male)	Ilaiyaraaja	Gangai Amaran	1:46

== Reception ==
P. S. S. of Kalki wrote that without touching too much of sadness and also not leaving a happy ending, one stills feel like saying "Welcome Parthi".
