= Akhila Kishore =

Indian actress

- Born: Bengaluru, India
- Occupation: Actor
- Years active: 2013–2016
- Spouse: Alankrit Chona (m.2018)

Akhila Kishore is a former Indian actress who has appeared in Kannada and Tamil language films. After making her debut in the Kannada film Padhe Padhe (2013).she won critical acclaim for her performances in Kathai Thiraikathai Vasanam Iyakkam (2014).

== Career ==
After completing her college and gaining a BE in Computer Science from the Global Academy of Technology, the 6 feet tall Akhila chose to venture into modelling and gained success participating in beauty pageants. She received recognition, gaining awards at the Femina Miss India Bangalore 2013 competition including MISS FASHION ICON along with Sobhita Dhulipala . Akhila made her film debut with the 2013 Kannada film, Padhe Padhe, with a critic noting she was "good" for the role. The actress was then asked to audition for a role in Kathai Thiraikathai Vasanam Iyakkam by director R. Parthiepan, and was subsequently selected to work on the film alongside several other newcomers. The film won positive reviews, as did Akhila for her performance, and she was subsequently signed on to work on the sequel.

She subsequently signed on to appear in a role alongside Santhanam in Inimey Ippadithan, which released in June 2015. She completed Masters from San Jose State University and working in Intel. She got married on 2 December 2018 to Alankrit Chona.

== Filmography ==
Year	Film	Role	Language	Notes
2013	Padhe Padhe	Kanchana	Kannada	Nominated, SIIMA Award for Best Kannada Female Debut
2014	Kathai Thiraikathai Vasanam Iyakkam	Daksha	Tamil	Nominated, Vijay Award for Best Debut Actress
2015	Q Premaku Chavuku	Dona	Telugu	Bilingual film
2015	Q Preethigu Saavigu	Dona	Kannada	Bilingual film
2015	Inimey Ippadithaan	Akhila	Tamil	
2016	Moondraam Ullaga Por	Madhivadhani / Madhi	Tamil	
