= Bharathi Kannamma =

- Poster
- Directed by: Cheran
- Written by: Cheran
- Produced by: Henry
- Starring: Parthiban; Meena
- Cinematography: Kichas
- Edited by: K. Thanikachalam
- Music by: Deva
- Production company: Pankaj Productions
- Release date: 15 January 1997
- Running time: 168 minutes
- Country: India
- Language: Tamil

Bharathi Kannamma (/bɑːrəðɪ/) is a 1997 Indian Tamil-language romantic drama film written and directed by Cheran in his directorial debut, starring R. Parthiban and Meena. The film marks Cheran's debut as a director and screenwriter. It was released on 15 January 1997 and emerged a success, winning three Filmfare Awards South including Best Film – Tamil. The film was remade in Kannada as Usire (2001).

== Plot ==
The protagonist is a landlord in Devar Palayam. In a community where wealthy landlords do not normally engage in unskilled labour, he does his own chores to make a social statement that all castes are equal.

In a flashback; Bharathi is a lower caste worker for a rich landlord, Vellaisamy Thevar. He saves Vellaisamy's daughter Kanamma at a local fair, and she falls in love with him. Bharathi's sister, Pechi, accompanies him to the fair and wants some anklets that Bharati cannot afford. Kanamma waits until everyone leaves after dinner and then gives Pechi some anklets. This is seen by Bharati, who is actually in love with her but does not reciprocate her feelings due to his loyalty towards Vellaisamy. Pechi settles with a higher-caste landlord's son living in the next village.

Vellaisamy thinks of getting his daughter married and finds a suitable candidate. On the day of the ponnu paarkura, a fire starts, and the groom's family views the union to be unfavorable. Afterward, Kanamma's burns are treated by Bharati, and she writes a letter about her love for him, but his name is obscured by her tears. The letter is discovered by her father, who attacks his daughter and tries to discover who she loves. Bharati later tells Kanamma that their relationship cannot happen due to caste differences. Vellaisamy's mother has a heart attack, and her last wish is to see Kanamma married. He consults astrologers who assure him of a match, while Kanamma remains depressed. When Bharathi is escorting some of his master's goods through a forest, he is stopped by Maayan, who has heard of Kanamma's marriage and vows to stop it.

Kanamma makes the goat sacrifice, and Bharati encourages her to accept her new husband, though he does so with great regret. During the sacrifice of the goat, Kanamma hallucinates that she led Bharati before her father and killed him. Throughout the preparations for the wedding, Bharati does not speak to Kanamma.

Pechi returns home and scolds Bharati for neglecting Kanamma. She tells Bharati to stop Kanamma from potentially killing herself, and he runs to her. Maayan and his gang come to the village and attack Bharati, who defeats them. However, he cannot stop Kanamma from committing suicide. He beats the parai at her funeral, unable to speak. After Vellaisamy is guided to light the torch, and all go to bathe in the river, Bharati throws himself on Kanamma's funeral pyre and burns with her. Vellaisamy realised that bharati was the person kannamma was in love with, but did not tell him due to caste problems. Vellaisamy tells to himself that bharati setting himself on pyre is symbolic representation of their love, and the other villagers grieve again for Bharati, and Vellaisamy adopts Pechi(bharati's sister), marries her to her high-caste lover, and sends them to the city.

Years later, Vellaisamy greets Pechi, her husband, and their children at the railway station forgetting about caste and discrimination of villagers.

== Cast ==
- Parthiban as Bharathi
- Meena as Kannamma
- Vijayakumar as Vellaisamy Thevar Ambalar
- Vadivelu as Eenamuthu
- Raja as Village officer
- Indhu as Pechi
- Ranjith as Maayan
- Anwar Ali Khan
- Pasi Narayanan
- Bayilvan Ranganathan
- M. Rathnakumar
- Crane Manohar as Senthil
- Ramyasri
- Vijayamma as Kannamma's grandmother
- Anitha
- Bonda Mani
- Theni Kunjarammal

== Production ==
Bharathi Kannamma is the directorial and screenwriting debut of Cheran. Arun Vijay and Karthik were initial choices for the lead actor before Parthiban was finalised. Scenes that Parthiban had written for a shelved film Karupannasamy were included, despite Cheran's initial reluctance. Though Parthiban was against the film's ending, feeling it was too tragic, Cheran remained firm on not changing it.

== Soundtrack ==
The music was composed by Deva.

Song	Singers	Lyrics	Length
"Chinna Chinna Kanamma"	Febi Mani	Vairamuthu	05:16
"Kottungada"	Mano	Vairamuthu	04:44
"Mercy Mercy"	Suresh Peters	Vaali	04:33
"Naalu Ezhuthu Kathathille"	Gangai Amaran	Vairamuthu	01:00
"Naalu Ezhuthu Paduchavare"	Swarnalatha	Vairamuthu	01:54
"Poonkatre Poonkatre"	K. J. Yesudas	Vaali	05:28
"Rayilu Rayilu"	Vadivelu	Vaali	04:34
"Retakili Rekkai"	Sushmitha, Mano	Vaali	05:04
"Thendralukku Theriyuma"	Arunmozhi, K. S. Chithra	Vairamuthu	05:14
"Vaadipatti Melamada"	Gangai Amaran	Vairamuthu	02:39

== Release and reception ==
Bharathi Kannamma was released on 15 January 1997. Upon release, the film was almost banned due to accusations of caste-subversive content. As a result, some releases had deleted scenes, and in Rajapalayam the film was not immediately released. R. P. R. of Kalki praised Cheran for treating the same old plot differently from other directors while also showing the mental flow of characters poetically while praising the acting of Parthiban and Meena but felt director falls flat in Vijayakumar's character. He also praised Cheran for having anti-climax in his debut film but concluded saying it is little tough for audience to accept lovers becoming immortal for creating immortal love stories. Ananda Vikatan rated the film 48 out of 100.

== Accolades ==
Event	Category	Recipient	Ref.
Cinema Express Awards	Best Actress – Tamil	Meena	
Tamil Nadu State Film Awards	Best Actor	R. Parthiban (Note: Shared with Vijay for Kadhalukku Mariyadhai.)	
Filmfare Awards South	Best Film – Tamil	Bharathi Kannamma	
Filmfare Awards South	Best Director – Tamil	Cheran	
Filmfare Awards South	Best Actress – Tamil	Meena	
Screen Awards	Best Film	Bharathi Kannamma	
Screen Awards	Best Actress	Meena	

== Bibliography ==
- Dhananjayan, G. (2011). The Best of Tamil Cinema, 1931 to 2010: 1977–2010. Galatta Media. OCLC 733724281.
