= Kathai Thiraikathai Vasanam Iyakkam =

2014 Indian film by R. Parthiepan

- Directed by: R. Parthiepan
- Written by: R.Parthiepan
- Produced by: K. Chandramohan; Haresh Vikram Vijayakumar
- Starring: Santhosh Prathap; Akhila Kishore
- Cinematography: Rajarathinam
- Edited by: R. Sudharsan
- Music by: Original songs: Vijay Antony; S. Thaman; Sharreth; Alphons Joseph; Background score: C. Sathya
- Production company: Reves Creations
- Distributed by: Bioscope Film Framers
- Release date: 15 August 2014
- Running time: 128 minutes
- Country: India
- Language: Tamil

Kathai Thiraikathai Vasanam Iyakkam (transl. Story, Screenplay, Dialogue, Direction; also referred to as KTVI) is a 2014 Indian Tamil-language independent satirical drama film written and directed by R. Parthiepan and produced by K. Chandramohan and independent producer, Haresh Vikram Vijayakumar. The project stars an all-new cast along with several experienced actors in cameo roles. It was Parthiepan's first directorial film in which he did not feature in the lead role. The film, with the tagline "a film without a story", began production in late 2013 and was released on 15 August 2014.

== Plot ==
The trope of the movie is that there is no plot. However, the movie narrates the events in the life of a crew of filmmakers as they attempt to get to a story for their proposed movie and whether they would succeed.

== Cast ==
- Santhosh Prathap as Thamizh
- Akhila Kishore as Daksha
- Dinesh Natarajan as Arvind
- Lallu as Murthy
- Sahithya Jagannathan as Shirley
- Vijay Ram as Murali
- Mahalakshmi as Deepa / Roopa
- Thambi Ramaiah as Seenu

=== Guest appearances ===
(in alphabetical order):

- Aishwarya Rajesh
- Arjun Nandhakumar
- Arya
- A. L. Azhagappan
- Amala Paul
- Arun Benny
- Bharath
- Cheran
- Dhananjayan Govind
- Disha
- Ineya
- Kalaignanam
- Parthiepan
- Prakash Raj
- Raghava Lawrence
- Roopa Shree
- Sandra Amy
- Shanthnu Bhagyaraj
- Srikanth
- Taapsee Pannu
- Thaman
- Venkat Prabhu
- Vijay Sethupathi
- Vimal
- Vishal
- Vishnu Raghav

== Production ==
In February 2013, actor-director R. Parthiepan announced that he would write and direct his twelfth feature film and title it Kathai Thiraikathai Vasanam Iyakkam, noting that he would not act in the film, unlike his previous ventures. The film began its shoot in December 2013 after Parthiepan had completed his acting assignments, with a schedule taking place in Chennai.

While newcomers were signed for the lead roles, several popular actors from the Tamil film industry were offered to play cameo roles in the film. Vijay Sethupathi first shot scenes for a day and did not take any remuneration for his participation and Parthiepan stated that Arya, Amala Paul, Nazriya and Prakash Raj were the other actors who had agreed to make cameo appearances. Amala Paul was subsequently requested to appear in a cameo role and agreed to continue filming for scenes in Coimbatore. She shot along with Arya, whose role was also extended. Nazriya meanwhile got engaged and backed out of all her projects she had accepted, including Kathai Thiraikathai Vasanam Iyakkam and instead Taapsee Pannu worked on the film for one day. It was reported that Suriya and Dhanush were also approached which was not confirmed by the director, who instead informed that Vishal would act in a few scenes. One of the film's lead actresses was revealed to be Akhila Kishore, a model who had appeared in few Kannada films.

== Soundtrack ==
Kathai Thiraikathai Vasanam Iyakkam

Soundtrack album by Alphons Joseph Sharreth Vijay Antony S. Thaman
- Released: 2014
- Recorded: 2014
- Genre: Soundtrack
- Length: 24:51
- Language: Tamil
- Label: Junglee Music
- Producers: Alphons Joseph; Sharreth; Vijay Antony; S. Thaman

Alphons Joseph chronology
Pranayakadha (2014)	Kathai Thiraikathai Vasanam Iyakkam (2014)	Lonappante Mamodeesa (2019)

Sharreth chronology
Naa Bangaaru Talli (2013)	Kathai Thiraikathai Vasanam Iyakkam (2014)	Drushyam (2014)

Vijay Antony chronology
Haridas (2013)	Kathai Thiraikathai Vasanam Iyakkam (2014)	Salim (2014)

S. Thaman chronology
Damaal Dumeel (2014)	Kathai Thiraikathai Vasanam Iyakkam (2014)	Rabhasa (2014)

The soundtrack album has four tracks composed by four different artists Alphons Joseph, Sharreth, Vijay Antony and S. Thaman. The title song by Alphons Joseph was released as a single on 12 May 2014 at Suriyan FM, the full album was launched on 25 May 2014. Parthiepan had stated that Yuvan Shankar Raja had agreed to compose a song for the film and that actress Simran had recorded a song in April 2014. The soundtrack album did not feature a song by neither artist, however. Actress Sneha also had recorded a song for the film, singing the pallavi and a charanam, but as she was displeased with the outcome, she suggested a professional singer replace her.

Track listing
No.	Title	Lyrics	Music	Singer(s)	Length
1.	"Kaathil Kathai Iruku"	Madhan Karky	Alphons Joseph	Alphons Joseph	7:16
2.	"Pen Maegam Polavae"	Na. Muthukumar	Sharreth	G. V. Prakash Kumar, Saindhavi	4:40
3.	"A for Azhagirukku"	Madhan Karky	Vijay Antony	Ramya NSK	4:03
4.	"Live the moment"	Madhan Karky	S. Thaman	Haricharan, Venkat Prabhu, Premgi Amaren, Nakul, Shanthanu Bhagyaraj	4:26
5.	"Pen Maegam Polavae (Version 2)"	Na. Muthukumar	Sharreth	G. V. Prakash Kumar, Saindhavi	4:26
Total length:					24:51

== Release ==
The satellite rights of the film were sold to STAR Vijay.

=== Critical reception ===
Baradwaj Rangan of The Hindu wrote "For a good part, it just wants to make us laugh — and that it does very well. The one-liners and Parthiban’s trademark dialogues are funny enough to camouflage the fact that this is actually a pretty serious premise...Kathai Thiraikathai (Vasanam Iyakkam), for the most part, is borne along with rhythms that are slightly off-kilter, and it has the snap of a student film". The Times of India gave the film 3.5 stars out of 5 and wrote, "Radhakrishnan Parthiban and his films can sometimes come across as over-smart, and being quirky just for the sake of being so. But in Kathai Thiraikathai Vasanam Iyakkam, this over smartness and quirkiness lend freshness to a regular one-line plot. The film proudly wears these two elements on its sleeves and feels fresh and zany". The New Indian Express wrote, "With his refreshing screenplay and an unconventional narrative style Parthiepan makes a bold and successful attempt to veer cinema from its routine beaten path...the film packs enough punch to make it worthwhile for audiences, to experience a celluloid journey that is intriguing and fascinating. Kathai (Thiraikathai Vasanam Iyakkam) comes as a whiff of fresh air". Sify wrote, "Kathai Thirakathai Vasanam Iyakkam...is fairly a decent and fresh approach to filmmaking...The film works largely on Parthipan’s smart writing and his humour laced sarcastic dialogues".
