= Oththa Seruppu Size 7 =

2019 Indian thriller film directed by R. Parthiepan

- Theatrical release poster
- Directed by: R. Parthiban
- Written by: R. Parthiban
- Produced by: R. Parthiban
- Starring: R. Parthiban
- Cinematography: Ramji
- Edited by: R. Sudharsan
- Music by: Santhosh Narayanan (One Song); C. Sathya (Background Score)
- Production company: Bioscope Film Framers
- Release dates: 30 August 2019 (Singapore South Asian Film Festival); 20 September 2019 (India)
- Running time: 105 minutes
- Country: India
- Language: Tamil

Oththa Seruppu Size 7 (transl. Single Slipper Size 7), simply known as Oththa Seruppu (transl. Single Slipper), is a 2019 Indian Tamil-language thriller film produced, written and directed by R. Parthiban under the banner Bioscope Film Framers. The film stars Parthiban himself as the only character. The background score for the film is composed by C. Sathya and the film has only one song, which is composed by Santhosh Narayanan. The film entered the Asia Book of Records and India Book of Records for having a single person writing, directing, solo acting and producing a film.

Oththa Seruppu premiered at the Singapore South Asian Film Festival on 30 August 2019. The film was released worldwide on 20 September 2019.The film opened to high critical acclaim.

It is being remade in Hindi with Abhishek Bachchan in the lead role and directed by Parthiban. The film was remade in Telugu as Degala Babji (2022) with Bandla Ganesh in the lead. The movie was also reported to be remade in Indonesian making it the first Tamil movie to be remade in that language and the second Indian movie to be remade in that language after Drishyam.

== Plot ==
Masilamani (R. Parthiban) is a suspect in a murder case and cops take him in custody for investigation. The movie starts with a middle-aged Masilamani (Parthiban) being interrogated by police personnel in a police station. The audience gets to hear only the voices of everyone else other than Masilamani. The deputy commissioner is leading the interrogation. Though some other cops in the unit suggest that they better use the typical police interrogation technique (which uses force and human rights violation techniques), the deputy commissioner refuses to approve because there is already a letter from the Human Rights Commission saying that they will be watching over this investigation. At some point, it becomes clear that Masilamani has a kid who needs medication, and even with medication, Masilamani's son is expected to live only for a few more years. Masilamani outwits the cops during the interrogation, and a female psychologist is brought in to help solve the case. It is revealed that Masilamani's wife is dead, and her body is presently held at the mortuary. Eventually, Masilamani starts to confess to not only the one murder he was accused of but also to two more murders, all of which happened using the same modus operandi (MO).

Masilamani, during his confession, states that he is married to Usha. They have a kid who is suffering from a terminal disease. His wife started to have affairs. When Masilamani confronted his wife about the affair, she regretted having it and said that she did it for the money to pay for their son's medical expenses. Masilamani, though dejected, agrees to live with his wife, provided she changes her way of life. She also blames the men in her affair for forcing her to sleep with them because they have a video of her taking a bath and are blackmailing her with her nude video. Masilamani, realizing that he won't be able to legally fight these powerful men, decides to murder them using a particular MO, which includes leaving a "single slipper of size 7" next to the dead bodies. Usha accidentally finds the other pair of "single slipper of size 7" and figures out that Masilamani is involved in the serial killing of the men with whom she had affairs. In panic mode, Usha arranges for henchmen to murder Masilamani. It is also revealed that Usha had affairs not out of blackmail but rather because he slept with those men willingly. But due to a quirk of fate, Usha gets killed in a road accident while the henchman escapes (but later it is revealed that the henchman was also murdered in the same MO).

Masilamani continues his revenge plot and kills the rest of the men who had an affair with his wife. He always leaves a "single slipper of size 7" next to all the murders. It is revealed that many years ago, the current head of police personnel helped a powerful minister get away with murdering his own brother and, in the process, accidentally left a "single slipper of size 7" next to his dead brother's body. Masilamani knew of the murder and the modus operandi of the murder and even had proof of the murder. Now that Masilamani has committed these three murders in the same MO, he makes a veiled threat that he will reveal the proof of the scandal if he is not released for his crime. He even states that the same MO in all the crimes will suggest that the one who murdered the minister's brother will be the prime suspect in all the subsequent murders. Because a powerful minister and a cop were involved in a murder and the subsequent cover-up, the cops decide to let go of Masilamani for the fear of all the truths coming out. The movie ends with Masilamani walking out of the police station with his son, making peace with his wife's death.

== Cast ==
- R. Parthiban as Masilamani

Voice cast

- Gayathrie Shankar as Usha
- Deepa Venkat as Dr. Surya

== Music ==
The background score is composed by C. Sathya. The film has only one song, titled "Kulirudha Pulla" which is composed by Santhosh Narayanan, and released on 19 May 2019. The song has lyrics written by Vivek, and it was sung by Sid Sriram, Sangeetha Karuppiah and R. Parthiepan.

No.	Title	Lyrics	Singer(s)	Length
1.	"Kulirudha Pulla"	Vivek	Sid Sriram, Sangeetha Karuppiah, R. Parthiepan	4:58

== Marketing ==
The first look was released on 8 May 2019, and the making video of the film was released on 9 May 2019. The official trailer of the film was unveiled on 27 May 2019.

== Release ==
The film was premiered at Singapore South Asian International Film Festival on 30 August 2019. The film was released alongside Suriya's Kaappaan.

=== Reception ===
Chennai Vision reviewing it noted, "Oththa Seruppu Size 7 is a rare attempt in Indian cinema. For, the film is written, directed, acted and produced by only one man-R Parthiepan."

Behindwoods rated 3.25/5 and stated that "Oththa Seruppu is a unique and engrossing film that is crafted with cinematic experiments. A must watch for Parthiban's passionate filmmaking!."

Sify rated 3/5 and stated that "Oththa Seruppu Size 7 review: Go for it if you are looking for something new and you will surely love the experience."

Baradwaj Rangan of Film Companion South wrote "Oththa Seruppu has also got to be one of the wittiest “message movies” ever, for, despite the cover of crime, the narrative is actually about haves and have-nots".

== Awards ==
Year	Ceremony	Category	Recipient(s)	Result	Ref.
2020	Toronto Tamil Film Festival	Best Feature Film (Jury Award) Best Feature Film Director (Jury Award) Best Solo Act Award	Oththa Seruppu Size 7 R. Parthiban R. Parthiban	Won	
2019	67th National Film Awards	Special Jury Award	R. Parthiban	Won	
2019	67th National Film Awards	Sound Mixing	Rasul Pookuty	Won	
