= Seenu (2000 film) =

- Directed by: P. Vasu
- Screenplay by: P. Vasu
- Story by: Lohithadas
- Starring: Karthik; Malavika; P. Vasu
- Cinematography: Vijay C. Kumar
- Edited by: P. Mohanraj
- Music by: Deva
- Production company: Seventh Channel Communications
- Release date: 25 October 2000
- Country: India
- Language: Tamil

Seenu is a 2000 Indian Tamil-language musical drama film directed by P. Vasu and produced by Manickam Narayanan. A remake of the 1991 Malayalam film Bharatham, the film stars Karthik, Malavika, and Vasu, while Vivek and Janagaraj play supporting roles. The music was composed by Deva with editing by Mohanraj. The film was released on 25 October 2000.

== Plot ==
Kesavan (P. Vasu) is a famous Carnatic singer who performs concerts. He lives with his family, consisting of his wife and son. Seenu (Karthik) is his younger brother who leads a joyful life. Seenu is very fond of Kesavan and cannot tolerate anyone speaking ill about him. Unfortunately, Kesavan develops a habit of consuming alcohol, which is only known to his wife. She tries hard to stop him from consuming alcohol, but all her efforts go in vain. She does not reveal this to her family members. Seenu falls in love with his relative Geetha (Malavika). When the family members come to know about Kesavan's drinking habits, they advise him to stop it as it will bring down the fame that he has earned so far. Kesavan does not listen to them and gets angry if someone starts advising him to stop drinking.

Slowly, Kesavan's drinking habits increase, and one day, he goes to a concert after drinking and stumbles on stage. Seenu is shocked to see this and rushes to the stage. To calm the crowd, Seenu starts singing in place of Kesavan at the concert. To everyone's surprise, Seenu's singing ability is great, and everyone appreciates him. Seenu feels happy about this but worries about his brother's condition. Seenu's public image increases, and he starts performing in concerts. Although Kesavan feels happy seeing his brother grow well, he develops an ego, thinking that Seenu will overpower him. This makes Kesavan behave rudely towards his family members, especially Seenu, and also descend into alcoholism. Kesavan feels embarrassed when people start approaching Seenu for concerts instead of him. Above this, Seenu gets an opportunity to sing in Tyagaraja Aradhana, which further angers Kesavan.

However, Seenu understands the reason behind Kesavan's behavior and decides to stop performing on stage. Seenu also meets Kesavan, explains how much he respects him, and makes it clear that overpowering Kesavan was never his aim. Kesavan feels bad hearing Seenu's emotional conversation and realizes his mistake. Kesavan and Seenu also have a sister whose wedding is fixed. The entire family gets back to happiness on the occasion of the wedding. Kesavan has also recovered and decides to go on a pilgrimage trip before his sister's wedding so that he can return pure. On the day before their sister's wedding, Seenu gets the information that Kesavan has met with an accident while he was on the pilgrimage and has died. Seenu is shocked but does not reveal this to his family, as it would stop his sister's wedding. Seenu rushes to the hospital to confirm the news and finds it to be Kesavan. He hides the information and instead attends his sister's wedding. Seenu informs that Kesavan could not make it to the wedding as he was busy at a temple. Once the wedding is over, Seenu reveals the truth, which shocks the entire family. Seenu later becomes a famous Carnatic singer, and the legacy continues, but he attributes all his success to Kesavan.

== Cast ==
- Karthik as Seenu
- Malavika as Geetha
- P. Vasu as Kesavan
- Vivek as Palanisamy
- Janagaraj as Mani
- Thyagu as Seenu's uncle
- Kaka Radhakrishnan as Seenu's grandfather
- Thalaivasal Vijay as Seenu's uncle
- Sathyapriya as Seetha, Seenu's mother
- Sabitha Anand as Janaki
- Ennathe Kannaiah as Servant
- Thalapathy Dinesh as Police inspector
- Crane Manohar as Groom
- Mayilsamy as Troupe song leader

== Production ==
The film initially developed under the title Thambikku Oru Paattu and then Poojai, before the name of the lead character was finalised as the title.

== Soundtrack ==
Soundtrack was composed by Deva. Lyrics were written by Vaali.

Track listing
No.	Title	Singer(s)	Length
1.	"Dey Nandakumara"	P. Unnikrishnan, K. S. Chithra
2.	"Kuchalaambaal"	Unni Menon, Harini
3.	"Madhava Sethumadhava"	Hariharan
4.	"Paadukiran Oru Paattu"	P. Unnikrishnan
5.	"Vanakkam"	Hariharan

== Reception ==
A critic from the entertainment portal Tamilet noted "The knot is taken from a Malayalam film. But somewhere along the way, the intensity and the emotional impact of the original is lost." Visual Dasan of Kalki praised the acting of Karthik but panned Vasu's acting and loud dialogue delivery of actors and Deva's music and called Vivek's comedy as the only relief and concluded saying Bharatham which rocked in Malayalam completely limps in Tamil as Seenu. K. N. Vijiyan of New Straits Times wrote "This movie should go down well with those who like family stories". Indiainfo wrote, "The actors were left with little to do justice to their roles with the director watering down the intensity of the original and making Malavika dance in shorts and Karthik in frenchie. Vivek's comedy is another great letdown and Deva gangs up with Vasu to spoil the pitch by giving a bad musical score. Camerawork by Vijay is nothing to write home about".
