= M. R. Krishnamurthy =

Indian actor and stage artist

- Krishnamurthy in 2010
- Born: M. R. Krishnamurthy; 1940
- Died: 2 August 2012 (aged 72); Chennai, Tamil Nadu, India
- Occupation: Actor
- Years active: 1969-2008
- Spouse: Sulochana
- Children: 2

M. R. Krishnamurthy (1940–2012) who was popularly referred to as MRK, was an Indian actor and stage artist who appeared in Tamil films. He starred in more than 100 films and in more than 500 stage plays conceived and hosted by various leading stage artistes.

== Film career ==
MRK's significant films are; Veetula Raman Veliyila Krishnan, Pondatti Thevai and Ulle Veliye and the Rajini-starrers Dharmathin Thalaivan and Arunachalam. He has also worked with Kamal Haasan in the film Maharasan and with Vikram in Dhill.

MRK worked as an assistant director under the late and legendary director C. V. Sridhar in a solitary film Oru Odai Nadhiyagiradhu which had the late Raghuvaran playing the lead role. He had also played significant roles in drama troupes, ran by the likes of V. Gopalakrishnan and Senthamarai, both of whom were popular actors in films as well as on stage.

== Partial filmography ==
Year	Film	Role	Notes
1969	Kaval Daivam		
1972	Thavaputhalvan		
1983	Veetula Raman Veliyila Krishnan		
1983	Oru Odai Nadhiyagirathu		
1984	Vengaiyin Maindhan		
1986	Pudhiya Poovithu		
1988	Dharmathin Thalaivan		
1990	Athisaya Piravi		
1990	Mallu Vetti Minor	Paramasivam	
1990	Nangal Puthiyavargal		
1990	Pudhu Vasantham		
1990	Pondatti Thevai	Naidu	
1990	Thalattu Ketkuthamma		
1992	Sevagan	Arumugam	
1992	Thalaivasal		
1992	Unnai Vaazhthi Paadugiren		
1993	Maharasan		
1993	Ulle Veliye		
1994	Namma Annachi		
1995	Puthiya Aatchi		
1995	Seethanam		
1996	Senathipathi		
1997	Arunachalam		
1997	Aahaa..!		
1997	Thedinen Vanthathu		
1998	Pudhumai Pithan		
2001	Dhill	Advocate Perumal	
2001	12B	Shakti's uncle	
2002	Varushamellam Vasantham	Venkataraman	
2003	Saamy		
2008	Seval		

== Death ==
MRK died on 2 August 2012. He had been affected by paralysis and was bed-ridden for the past few months. His wife died in 2008 and MRK was survived by a son and a daughter.
