= R. Parthiban =

Indian actor and film director (born 1958)

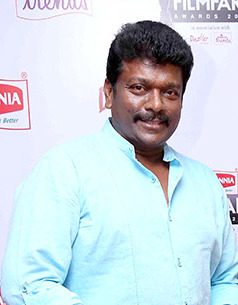
- Parthiban at 62nd Filmfare Awards South
- Born: Radhakrishnan Parthiban; 14 January 1958 (age 68); Madras, Tamil Nadu, India
- Occupations: Actor; film director; screenwriter
- Years active: 1981–present
- Spouse: Seetha (m. 1990; div. 2004)
- Children: 3
- Awards: Kalaimamani Award (2006)

Radhakrishnan Parthiban (born 14 January 1958) is an Indian actor, film director, and screenwriter, who works mainly in Tamil cinema. He has directed 16 films, produced 14 films and acted in more than 70 films. He started his career as assistant director for K. Bhagyaraj in 1984 and the duo worked in over 20 films from 1984 to 1991. Parthiban is known for having directed critically acclaimed films such as Pudhiya Paadhai (1989) and House Full (1999) won the National Film Award for Best Feature Film in Tamil. He also won National Film Award – Special Jury Award in Otha Seruppu Size 7 (2019).

His performances as actor are in successful films such as Bharathi Kannamma (1997), Nee Varuvai Ena (1999), Vetri Kodi Kattu (2000), Azhagi (2002), Aayirathil Oruvan (2010), Melvilasom (2011), Otha Seruppu Size 7 (2019) and Iravin Nizhal (2022).

On 25 December 2018, he was appointed as the new Vice President of the Tamil Film Producers Council replacing Gautham Vasudev Menon and Prakash Raj who were jointly holding the position until 24 December 2018.

== Early and personal life ==
Parthiban was born in a Telugu-speaking Gavara Naidu family. on 14 January 1958 in Madras (now Chennai), Tamil Nadu, India. His father’s name is Radhakrishnan, and his mother’s name is Padmavati. His hometown is Trichy, Tamil Nadu. He began his career as an assistant director on the film Vedikkai Manidhargal, directed by his relative B.V. Balaguru. He also assisted with the film's dialogues under the name R. Moorthy. After this, he joined as an assistant of K. Bhagyaraj. At that time, he used to make around Rs 6000 a month by dubbing for various artists. He made his first film appearance in Ranuva Veeran (1981). Then, he played the role of a postman in his mentor's Dhavani Kanavugal (1984).

Apart from direction and acting, he produces films. He wrote a book, Kirukkkalgal – Thamizh Kavithai Thoguppu, which was released by M. Karunanidhi. He runs a charitable trust named "R.Parthepan Manidha Neya Mandram".

Parthiban married actress Seetha in 1990, with whom he worked in Pudhea Paadhai the previous year. The couple has two daughters including P. S. Keerthana, who won the National Film Award for Best Child Artist for Kannathil Muthamittal (2002), and an adopted son. The couple filed for divorce in September 2003, which was granted in March 2004. Their daughter Abhinaya married Naresh Karthik, a great-grandson of legendary actor M. R. Radha, while their other daughter, Keerthana, married Akshay Akkineni, the son of acclaimed film editor Sreekar Prasad.

== Career ==
In 1989, he made his directorial debut through Pudhiya Paadhai, starring himself as an inhuman ruffian who gets reformed by his rape victim. The film was released to critical acclaim and emerged a box office success, while also winning several accolades, including the National Film Award for Best Feature Film in Tamil, Tamil Nadu State Film Award for Best Film and Tamil Nadu State Film Award for Best Story Writer. In early 1990, he directed and acted in Pondatti Thevai, which failed at the box office. In the end of 1990, he appeared in R. Sundarrajan's Thalattu Padava and in the devotional film Engal Swamy Ayyappan. In 1991, he starred in S. P. Muthuraman's Thaiyalkaran. In 1992, he starred in Unnai Vaazhthi Paadugiren, co-starring with Suman Ranganathan and Mohini. He then directed and acted in Sugamana Sumaigal, a clean family drama, which failed at the box office. In 1993, to recoup the financial losses, he directed and acted in the commercial film Ulle Veliye. Ayyappa Prasad of The New Indian Express labelled the film as "flesh and bore". Despite negative reviews, the film has been declared a super hit at the box office. He then directed and acted in 1994 in Sarigamapadani and the next year in Pullakuttikaran. In 1996, he acted in the comedy film Tata Birla.

He won Tamil Nadu State Film Award for Best Actor for Bharathi Kannamma (1997). He played a man from a lower caste who a zamindari falls in love with. Parthipan, the actor, director and producer, loves breaking the conventional rules set by commercial cinema. He has taken roles that other heroes would carefully avoid, directed films that his critics found to be arty. The actor has remained uncompromising and stuck to his principles in spite of some not-so-memorable roles in the past. After the critically acclaimed and award-winning films such as House Full (1999) and Azhagi (2002), audience and the trade have acknowledged the maker's undisputed talents. His 1999 Tamil film House Full won the same award.

In 2001, he launched an ambitious directorial project titled Yelelo, with A. R. Rahman composing four songs for the film. Despite having a high-profile launch and completion of a few filming schedules, the venture was shelved. Similarly, he launched three films simultaneously titled Kartha, Rowdy and Adi after the failure of Kudaikul Mazhai (2004), though all projects were abandoned.

The film Aayirathil Oruvan (2010), in which he portrayed a Chola King, won him the Filmfare Award for Best Supporting Actor – Tamil. His previously released movie Kathai Thiraikathai Vasanam Iyakkam becomes Parthiban's first directorial film in which he does not feature in the lead role. The film, which has a tagline reading "a film without a story?", began production in late 2013 and released on 15 August 2014 and received positive reviews from all the sides and was a huge blockbuster hit in the box office. In 2015, he portrayed a cop in Massu Engira Masilamani and played a comedian villain in Naanum Rowdy Dhaan. He acted in supporting role in the Maaveeran Kittu (2016) and Koditta Idangalai Nirappuga (2017). He appeared in Kannada movie Dada Is Back (2017), which he played in lead role as undisputed king of the underworld in Bengaluru. Followed by a comedy film, Podhuvaga Emmanasu Thangam (2017). In 2018, he acted in the drama film Keni.

In 2019, Parthiban wrote, directed and appeared in Oththa Seruppu Size 7, as the only character. He revealed that it was his 18-year dream to make this film. Along with the outstanding performance and sharp visuals, the film is amplified by the amazing sound design which gives life to the uncanny, yet detailed confession of Masilamani. At 67th National Film Awards, Parthiban won the Special Jury Award. He also wins three awards at Toronto Tamil Film Festival, which includes the Jury Award for Best Feature Film, Jury Award for Best Feature Film Director and Best Solo Act Award. Parthiban has been a part of multi-starrers as well, including Ponmagal Vandhal (2020), Tughlaq Durbar (2021), Yutha Satham (2022), Ponniyin Selvan (2022) and Ponniyin Selvan: II (2023).

== Filmography ==
=== As director and writer ===
List of R. Parthiban film directing and writing credits
Year	Film	Credited as			Notes
Year	Film	Director	Writer	Producer	Notes
1989	Pudhiya Paadhai	✓	✓		Won—Tamil Nadu State Film Award for Best Film; Won—National Film Award for Best Feature Film in Tamil; Won—Tamil Nadu State Film Award for Best Story Writer
1990	Pondatti Thevai	✓	✓		
1992	Sugamana Sumaigal	✓	✓	✓	
1993	Ulle Veliye	✓	✓	✓	
1994	Sarigamapadani	✓	✓	✓	
1995	Pullakuttikaran	✓	✓	✓	
1999	House Full	✓	✓	✓	Won—National Film Award for Best Feature Film in Tamil; Won—Tamil Nadu State Film Award for Best Director; Won—Tamil Nadu State Film Special Award for Best Film
2000	James Pandu		✓		Story only
2002	Ivan	✓	✓	✓	
2004	Kudaikul Mazhai	✓	✓	✓	
2006	Pachchak Kuthira	✓	✓	✓	
2011	Vithagan	✓	✓	✓	
2014	Kathai Thiraikathai Vasanam Iyakkam	✓	✓	✓	Cameo
2017	Koditta Idangalai Nirappuga	✓	✓	✓	
2019	Otha Seruppu Size 7	✓	✓	✓	Won—National Film Award – Special Jury Award (feature film); Won—Toronto Tamil Film Festival Jury Award Best Feature Film; Won—Toronto Tamil Film Festival Jury Award Best Feature Film Director
2022	Iravin Nizhal	✓	✓	✓	
2024	Teenz	✓	✓	✓	

=== As actor ===
Films

List of R. Parthiban film acting credits
Year	Title	Role	Notes
1981	Ranuva Veeran	Bridegroom	Uncredited role
1982	Parvaiyin Marupakkam	Lawyer	Uncredited role
1982	Vedikkai Manithargal	Director	Uncredited role
1983	Dhooram Adhighamillai	Villager	Uncredited role
1984	Anbulla Rajinikanth	Bhagyaraj's assistant director	Uncredited role
1984	Dhavani Kanavugal	Ponnusami	
1989	Pudhiya Paathai	Sitaraman	
1990	Pondatti Thevai	Kannan	
1990	Thalattu Padava	Raja	
1990	Engal Swamy Ayyappan	Vasuswamy	
1991	Thaiyalkaran	Pandian	
1992	Unnai Vaazhthi Paadugiren	Ravi	
1992	Sugamana Sumaigal	Moorthy	
1993	Ulle Veliye	Gajendran	
1994	Sarigamapadani	Kulasekaran	
1995	Pullakuttikaran	Veeraiyan	
1996	Tata Birla	Raja	
1997	Bharathi Kannamma	Bharathi	Won, Tamil Nadu State Film Award for Best Actor
1997	Vaimaye Vellum	Yama Dharman "Raja"	
1997	Aravindhan	Thamizhvannan	
1997	Abhimanyu	ACP Abhimanyu	
1998	Swarnamukhi	Pandian	
1998	Pudhumai Pithan	Jeeva (aka Bharath)	
1999	House Full	Ayya	
1999	Suyamvaram	Azhagappan	
1999	Anthapuram	Dubai Pandiyan	
1999	Poovellam Kettuppar	Himself	Cameo appearance
1999	Nee Varuvai Ena	Ganesh	
1999	Unnaruge Naan Irundhal	Taxi driver	
2000	Kakkai Siraginilae	Vellaichamy	
2000	James Pandu	Pandu	
2000	Unnai Kodu Ennai Tharuven	Shekhar	Guest appearance
2000	Vetri Kodi Kattu	Muthuraman	
2000	Sabhash	Cheenu	
2001	Ninaikkatha Naalillai	Anbu	
2001	Narendran Makan Jayakanthan Vaka	Narendran alias Devasahayam	Malayalam film
2002	Azhagi	Shanmugam	
2002	Ivan	Jeevan	
2002	Kadhal Virus	Himself	Cameo appearance
2003	Soori	Manikandan	Guest appearance
2003	Kadhal Kirukkan	Saravanan	
2004	Thendral	A. P. Nalankilli	
2004	Kudaikul Mazhai	Venkatakrishnan	
2005	Kannadi Pookal	Sakthivel	
2005	Kundakka Mandakka	Ilango	
2006	Pachchak Kuthira	Pachchamuthu	
2007	Ammuvagiya Naan	Gowrishankar	
2008	Vallamai Tharayo	Anand	
2010	Aayirathil Oruvan	Meignanandha Sivapaadha Sekara Chozhar	Won, Filmfare Award for Best Supporting Actor – Tamil
2010	Azhagana Ponnuthan	Karthik	
2011	Melvilasom	Ramachandran	Malayalam film
2011	Vithagan	ACP Rowdhran	
2012	Ambuli	Sengodan	
2012	Rachcha	Suryanarayana	Telugu film Cameo appearance
2013	Escape from Uganda	Antony	Malayalam film
2013	Jannal Oram	Karuppu	
2014	Kathai Thiraikathai Vasanam Iyakkam	Himself	Cameo
2015	Masss	ACP Vikram Lakshmanan	
2015	Tihar	Alexander	Partially dubbed film
2015	Naanum Rowdy Dhaan	Killivalavan	Nominated, Filmfare Award for Best Supporting Actor – Tamil
2016	Maaveeran Kittu	Chinrasu	Nominated, SIIMA Award for Best Actor in a Supporting Role
2017	Koditta Idangalai Nirappuga	Rangarajan	
2017	Mupparimanam	Himself	Cameo appearance
2017	Dada is Back	Tippu	Kannada film
2017	Podhuvaga En Manasu Thangam	Oothukaandaan	
2018	Keni	Shaktivel	
2019	Kuppathu Raja	MG Rajendran	
2019	Ayogya	Kaalirajan	
2019	Oththa Seruppu Size 7	Maasilamani	Won, Tamil Nadu State Film Award for Best Actor; Won, Toronto Tamil Film Festival Best Solo Act Award
2019	Thittam Poattu Thirudura Kootam	Sethu	
2020	Ponmagal Vandhal	Rajarathinam	
2021	Tughlaq Durbar	Rayappan	
2022	Yutha Satham	SI Kathirvelan	
2022	Iravin Nizhal	Nandu	
2022	Ponniyin Selvan: I	Chinna Pazhuvettayar	
2023	Ponniyin Selvan: II	Chinna Pazhuvettayar	
2023	Dhruva Natchathiram	TBA	Unreleased film
2024	Teenz	Jana	
2024	Thiru.Manickam	Himself	Cameo appearance
2025	Idli Kadai	Arivu	
2026	Ustaad Bhagat Singh	Chadala Marri Nalla Nagappa	Telugu film
2026	Pradhama Drishtiya Kuttakkar	Major Vasudevan	Malayalam film; cameo appearance
2027	Operation Ganga †	TBA	Malayalam film (Filming)
2027	Dare Devil †	TBA	Pre-Production

Web series

List of R. Parthiban web series acting credits
Year	Title	Role	Notes
2022	Suzhal: The Vortex	Shanmugam	

=== As singer ===
List of R. Parthiban film singing credits
Year	Title	Song	Composer	Notes
1995	Sarigamapadani	"Hey Kala Kala"	Deva	
2005	Kannadi Pookal	"Dey Vasu"	S. A. Rajkumar	
2024	Teenz	"Bibli Bibli Bili Bili"	D. Imman	Co-singers include D. Imman, Arivu, Key

=== As lyricist ===
List of R. Parthiban film credits as a lyricist
Year	Title	Song	Composer	Notes
2004	Kudaikul Mazhai	"Adiye Kiliye"	Karthik Raja	
2006	Pachakuthirai	All songs	Sabesh–Murali	
2011	Vithagan	All songs	Joshua Sridhar	
2017	Koditta Idangalai Nirappuga	"Kilukilu Payai", "Wife Love"	C. Sathya	
2022	Iravin Nizhal	"Kaayam", "Bejara", "Kannethire"	A. R. Rahman	
2024	Teenz	"Kaanaathathai Naan Kandeney", "Vaanamey Kaanomey", "Ikky Pikky", "Yesuvey Nee Pesuvey", "We Are The Teenz"	D. Imman	Also co-lyricist for "Bibli Bibli Bili Bili" with Arivu

=== As narrator ===
- 12B (2001)
- Azhagai Irukkirai Bayamai Irukkirathu (2006)
- Aval Peyar Thamizharasi (2010)
- Moscowin Kavery (2010)
- Athiradi Vettai (2014)
- Oru Melliya Kodu (2016)
- Devi 2 (2019)
- Adavi (2020)
- Time Enna Boss (2020; web series)
- Koogle Kuttappa (2022)
- House Mates (2025)

== Awards and honours ==
Event	Year	Category	Movie	Outcome
National Film Awards
National Film Awards	1989	Best Regional Film	Pudhiya Padhai	Won
National Film Awards	1999	Best Regional Film	House Full	Won
National Film Awards	2019	Special Jury Award	Oththa Seruppu Size 7	Won
Tamil Nadu State Film Awards
Tamil Nadu State Film Awards	1989	Best Story Writer	Pudhiya Padhai	Won
Tamil Nadu State Film Awards	1997	Best Actor	Bharathi Kannamma	Won
Tamil Nadu State Film Awards	1999	Best Director	House Full	Won
Tamil Nadu State Film Awards	2016	Best Character Artiste	Maaveeran Kittu	Won
Tamil Nadu State Film Awards	2019	Best Actor	Oththa Seruppu Size 7	Won
Tamil Nadu State Film Awards	2019	Best Director	Oththa Seruppu Size 7	Won
Tamil Nadu State Film Awards	2019	Best Film (Second Prize)	Oththa Seruppu Size 7	Won
Tamil Nadu State Film Awards	2022	Best Film (Special Prize)	Iravin Nizhal	Won

=== Honours ===
- Kalaimamani Award - 2006
