= List of Tamil films of 1991 =

Post-amendment to the Tamil Nadu Entertainments Tax Act 1939 on 1 April 1958, Gross jumped to 140 per cent of Nett Commercial Taxes Department disclosed ₹69 crore in entertainment tax revenue for the year.

A list of films produced in the Tamil film industry in India in 1991 by release date:

== Released films ==
Opening		Title	Director	Cast	Production	Music director
J A N	11	Gnana Paravai	Vietnam Veedu Sundaram	Sivaji Ganesan, Harish Kumar, Sasikala, Manorama	Yagava Productions	M. S. Viswanathan
J A N	11	Sami Potta Mudichu	R. Sundarrajan	Murali, Sindhu	Amma Creations	Ilaiyaraaja
J A N	11	Sigaram	Ananthu	S. P. Balasubrahmanyam, Rekha, Radha, Anand Babu, Ramya Krishnan	Kavithalayaa Productions	S. P. Balasubrahmanyam
J A N	11	Vaa Arugil Vaa	Kalaivanan Kannadasan	Raja, Vaishnavi, Ramya Krishnan	Chozha Cine Arts	Chanakya
J A N	12	Eeramana Rojave	K. R.	Shiva, Mohini	K. R Enterprises	Ilaiyaraaja
J A N	14	Dharma Durai	Rajasekhar	Rajinikanth, Gautami, Nizhalgal Ravi	Raasikala Mandhir International	Ilaiyaraaja
J A N	14	Kumbakarai Thangaiah	Gangai Amaran	Prabhu, Kanaka	Murugan Cine Arts	Ilaiyaraaja
J A N	14	Naadu Adhai Naadu	Ramathilaga Rajan	Ramarajan, Rupini, Goundamani, Senthil	Meena Movies	Deva
J A N	14	Perum Pulli	Vikraman	Babu, Suman Ranganathan	Super Good Films	S. A. Rajkumar
J A N	14	Thaiyalkaran	S. P. Muthuraman	Parthiban, Aishwarya	Kalaippuli International	S. P. Balasubrahmanyam
J A N	14	Theechati Govindhan	Sasi Mohan	Thyagarajan, Gautami	Sri Rajeshwari Creations	Sangeetha Rajan
F E B	1	Thai Poosam	Rama Narayanan	Nassar, Bhanupriya, Shamili	Sri Thenaandal Films	Shankar–Ganesh
F E B	1	Vanakkam Vathiyare	Ameerjan	Karthik, Saranya	P. S. V. Pictures	V. R. Sampath Selvan
F E B	14	Namma Ooru Mariamma	K. Rajan	Nizhalgal Ravi, Vaidehi, R. Sarathkumar	Ganesh Cine Arts	Shankar–Ganesh
F E B	14	Nanbargal	Shoba Chandrasekhar	Neeraj, Mamta Kulkarni	V. V. Creations	Babu Bose
F E B	14	Sir... I Love You	G. N. Rangarajan	Sivakumar, Lakshmi	Jagan Mohini Movies	Ilaiyaraaja
F E B	15	Aasai Kiliye Kobama	T. K. Prasad	Balachander, Devi	Art Land Movies	S. A. Rajkumar
F E B	16	Irumbu Pookkal	G. M. Kumar	Karthik, Pallavi, Rekha	Pushpalayaam Movies	M. S. Viswanathan, Ilaiyaraaja
F E B	21	Naan Pudicha Mappillai	V. Sekhar	Nizhalgal Ravi, Saranya, Aishwarya, Goundamani, Senthil	Jayalakshmi Movie Combines	Chandrabose
F E B	23	Chithirai Pookkal	Kanmani Subbu	Jayanthkumar, Vinodhini, R. Sarathkumar	Naachiyaar Movies	M. S. Murari
M A R	15	Annan Kaatiya Vazhi	K. S. Madhangan	Ramarajan, Seetha, Rupini	East Gold Films	S. A. Rajkumar
M A R	15	Mookuthi Poomeley	Sangaman	Soundarrajan, Kalairanjani	Best Cine Films	V. S. Narasimhan
M A R	15	Pudhu Nellu Pudhu Naathu	Bharathiraja	Rahul, Sukanya	Mookambigai Art Creations	Ilaiyaraaja
M A R	15	Uruvam	G. M. Kumar	Mohan, Pallavi, Jayamala	Prathik Pictures	Ilaiyaraaja
M A R	15	Vetri Karangal	R. Krishnamoorthy	Prabhu, Prem Menon, Rupini, Sadhana	A Lotus Film Company	Ilaiyaraaja
M A R	15	Vetri Padigal	Manobala	Ramki, Nirosha, R. Sarathkumar	Chithramahal and S. D. Enterprises	Ilaiyaraaja
M A R	22	Apoorva Naagam	Chozharajan	Nizhalgal Ravi, Gautami, Srividya	V. K. Films	Shankar–Ganesh
M A R	22	Gopura Vasalile	Priyadarshan	Karthik, Bhanupriya, Suchithra	Arul Nithi Films	Ilaiyaraaja
M A R	22	Pudhu Manithan	Manivannan	Sathyaraj, Bhanupriya, Goundamani	Sathya Movies	Deva
M A R	23	Thanga Thamaraigal	V. Azhagappan	Arjun, Rupini	Gangai Film Circuit	Ilaiyaraaja
A P R	12	Chinna Thambi	P. Vasu	Prabhu, Khushbu, Goundamani	Malar Combines	Ilaiyaraaja
A P R	13	En Rasavin Manasile	Kasthuri Raja	Rajkiran, Meena, Saradha Preetha, Goundamani, Senthil, Vadivelu	Redsun Art Creations	Ilaiyaraaja
A P R	14	Adhikari	P. Vasu	C. Arunpandian, Gautami	Jayanthi Films	Gangai Amaran
A P R	14	Captain Prabhakaran	R. K. Selvamani	Vijayakanth, R. Sarathkumar, Rupini, Ramya Krishnan	I. V. Cine Productions	Ilaiyaraaja
A P R	14	Enga Ooru Sippai	K. Manimurugan	Arjun, Sri Bhanu	Madurai J. C. Films	S. A. Rajkumar
A P R	14	Nattai Thirudathey	Senthilnathan	Janagaraj, Sumithra, Ravi Raghavendra, R. Dilip, Anjana, Vaidehi	Lakshmi Productions	S. A. Rajkumar
A P R	14	Pavunnu Pavunuthan	K. Bhagyaraj	K. Bhagyaraj, Rohini	Eknaath Movie Creations	K. Bhagyaraj
A P R	19	Karpoora Mullai	Fazil	Raja, Amala	Ilaiyaraaja Creations	Ilaiyaraaja
A P R	19	Shanti Enathu Shanti	T. Rajendar	T. Rajendar, Radha, Ramesh Babu, Neeta Puri, Silambarasan	Chimbu Cine Arts	T. Rajendar
M A Y	3	Marikozhundhu	Pudhiyavan	Ramesh Aravind, Aishwarya, Goundamani, Senthil	A. K. M. Creations	Deva
M A Y	10	Aatha Un Koyilile	Kasthuri Raja	Selva, Kasthuri, Ravi Rahul, Vinodhini	Anbalaya Films	Deva
M A Y	10	Nallathai Naadu Kekum	Jeppiaar	Jeppiaar, Gautami, Rekha	Jepiyar Pictures	Shankar–Ganesh
M A Y	11	Kaaval Nilayam	Senthilnathan	R. Sarathkumar, Anandaraj, Gautami, Senthil	Vijayakumari Films	Shankar–Ganesh
M A Y	17	Idhaya Vaasal	Chandranath	Ramesh Aravind, Meena, R. Sarathkumar, Goundamani, Vivek	Vasanthalayaa Creations	Viji
M A Y	17	Mill Thozhilali	A. Jagannathan	Ramarajan, Aishwarya, Senthil	Kavibharathy Creations	Deva
M A Y	31	Cheran Pandian	K. S. Ravikumar	R. Sarathkumar, Vijayakumar, Manjula Vijayakumar, Anand Babu, Sreeja, Chithra, Goundamani, Senthil	Super Good Films	Soundaryan
M A Y	31	Ennarukil Nee Irunthal	Sundar K. Vijayan	Guru, Priyanka	Thamizh Thaai Movies	Ilaiyaraaja
M A Y	31	Mahamayi	Babubhai Mistry	K. R. Vijaya, Shobana, Sridhar	Malar Combines	K. V. Mahadevan
J U N	7	Manitha Jaathi	P. Kalaimani	Sivakumar, Ramki, Nirosha	Everest Films	Ilaiyaraaja
J U N	21	Naan Pogum Paadhai	Vetri Vendhan	Vetri Vendhan, Anju	Thamizh Cine Arts	Devendran
J U N	21	Pudhiya Raagam	Jayachitra	Jayachitra, Rahman, Raghuvaran	Amresh Pictures	Ilaiyaraaja
J U N	21	Thambi Varuvanam	F. S. Mariyar	Mohan Chandra, Ragha Devi	Pidiling Productions	T. T. Sundarrajan
J U N	22	Sendhoora Devi	Rama Narayanan	Vivek, Kanaka, Shamili	Sri Thenandal Films	Shankar–Ganesh
J U N	22	Thanthu Vitten Ennai	C. V. Sridhar	Vikram, Rohini	Chithraalaya Movies	Ilaiyaraaja
J U N	28	Maanagara Kaaval	M. Thiyagarajan	Vijayakanth, Suman Ranganathan	AVM Productions	Chandrabose
J U N	28	Vaaku Moolam	K. Subash	Isari Ganesh, K. S. Jayalakshmi	Thanuja Films	Shankar–Ganesh
J U N	28	Vigneshwar	R. Raghu	Karthik, Khushbu, Geetha	Anbu Lakshmi Films	Sangeetha Rajan
J U N	29	Ayul Kaithi	K. Subash	Prabhu, Revathi	Ram Balaji Movies	Shankar–Ganesh
J U L	5	Archana IAS	A. Jagannathan	Sithara, R. Sarathkumar, Siva	Deivaanai Movies	S. A. Rajkumar
J U L	12	Malaicharal	Rajan	Ramkumar, Seema	Himalaya International	M. S. Murari
J U L	12	Mangalyam Thanthunane	Ravidasan	K. Prabakaran, Vaishnavi, Ravi Rahul, Jeeva	Kokkintha Cine Arts	Deva
J U L	12	Pondatti Pondattithan	Maniyan Sivabalan	S. Ve. Shekher, Kadambari	VRJ Films	Gangai Amaran
J U L	12	Vaidehi Kalyanam	Manivasagam	R. Sarathkumar, Rekha, Goundamani, Senthil, Ramarjun, Uthra	Raja Pushpa Pictures	Deva
J U L	26	Veetla Eli Velila Puli	Venkat	S. Ve. Shekher, Rupini	Kausalya Pictures	Shankar–Ganesh
A U G	15	Azhagan	K. Balachander	Mammootty, Bhanupriya, Geetha, Madhoo	Kavithalayaa Productions	Maragadha Mani
A U G	30	Anbu Sangili	B. Nithyaraj	Anand Babu, Shamili, Udhayan, Subiksha, Dharani	Sivasree Pictures	Ilayagangai
A U G	30	Idhaya Oonjal	C. K. Surendran	Anand Babu, Meena, Nizhalgal Ravi, Rekha	Great Success Films	S. A. Rajkumar
A U G	30	Jenma Natchathram	Thakkali Srinivasan	Pramodh, Sindhuja, Nassar	Thirai Gangai Films	Premi-Srini
A U G	30	Oorellaam Un Paattu	Siraj	Ramarajan, Aishwarya, Goundamani, Senthil	Aiyanaar Cine Arts	Ilaiyaraaja
S E P	6	Idhayam	Kathir	Murali, Heera	Sathya Jyothi Films	Ilaiyaraaja
S E P	6	Naan Valartha Poove	Rajesh Khanna	Gururajan, Rupini	Vijayalakshmi Movie Combines	Rajesh Khanna
S E P	6	Onnum Theriyatha Pappa	G. B. Thambi Durai	Nizhalgal Ravi, Anand Babu, Raja, Silk Smitha, Sindhu, Meenakshi	Poonkuyil Pictures	Shankar–Ganesh
S E P	13	MGR Nagaril	Alleppey Ashraf	Anand Babu, Sukanya	Super Good Films	S. Balakrishnan
S E P	13	Manasara Vazhthungalen	G. Parthibaraman	Ramkumar, Sivaranjani	Gaja Nithi Films	S. A. Rajkumar
S E P	13	Nee Pathi Naan Pathi	Vasanth	Rahman, Gautami, Heera	Kavithalayaa Productions	Maragadha Mani
S E P	13	Thambikku Oru Paattu	Ashok Kumar	Rishi, Balambika, Silk Smitha	H. V. S. Productions	Ilaiyaraaja
S E P	20	Vasanthakala Paravai	Pavithran	R. Sarathkumar, Ramesh Aravind, Shali	A. R. S. Film International	Deva
S E P	20	Kizhakku Karai	P. Vasu	Prabhu, Khushbu	Sree Rajakaaliamman Enterprises	Deva
S E P	27	Sirai Kadhavugal	T. R. Selvam	Nizhalgal Ravi, Rekha	Cinemaalaya Film Circuit	V. Jayasekar
S E P	27	Sivaranjani	K. Rangaraj	Aravind, Suchitra	Kala Chithra International	S. A. Rajkumar
O C T	2	Nattukku Oru Nallavan	V. Ravichandran	Rajinikanth, Juhi Chawla, Khushbu, V. Ravichandran	Sree Eshwari Productions	Hamsalekha
O C T	4	Marupakkam	K. S. Sethumadhavan	Sivakumar, Jayabharathi, Radha	National Film Development Corporation	L. Vaidyanathan
O C T	4	Oyilattam	R. Sundarrajan	Raghunath, Charmila	Liyo International	Deva
O C T	11	Eeshwari	Rama Narayanan	Nassar, Gautami, Anand Babu	Sri Sakthi Film Combines	Shankar–Ganesh
O C T	11	Oru Oomaiyin Raagam	C. Gurushankar	C. Gurushankar, Mayuri	G. V. Cine Creations	Shankar–Ganesh
O C T	11	Vaasalil Oru Vennila	Cochin Haneefa	Nizhalgal Ravi, Amala	Murali Kala Manthir	Deva
O C T	21	Iyumbathilum Aasai Varum	P. Kalaimani	Raja Raveendar, Surli Rajan, Sathyakala	Mansoor Arts	Shankar–Ganesh
N O V	5	Bramma	K. Subash	Sathyaraj, Khushbu, Bhanupriya	Raj Films International	Ilaiyaraaja
N O V	5	En Pottukku Sonthakkaran	Sekar Raja	Ramki, Sasikala	Kavithalayaa Productions	Deva
N O V	5	Gunaa	Santhana Bharathi	Kamal Haasan, Roshini, Rekha	Swathi Chithra International	Ilaiyaraaja
N O V	5	Moondrezhuthil En Moochirukkum	Manobala	Vijayakanth, Rupini	Seranaadu Movie Creations	Ilayagangai
N O V	5	Nenjamundu Nermaiyundu	E. Ramdoss	Ramarajan, Rupini	Maila Films	S. A. Rajkumar
N O V	5	Pillai Paasam	Cochin Haneefa	Sivakumar, Ramki, Sumithra, Rupini	Poombukaar Productions	Ilaiyaraaja
N O V	5	Rudhra	Sasi Mohan	K. Bhagyaraj, Gautami, Lakshmi	Sree Rajeshwari Creations	Gangai Amaran
N O V	5	Thalapathi	Mani Ratnam	Rajinikanth, Mammootty, Shobana, Bhanupriya, Arvind Swamy, Geetha	GV Films	Ilaiyaraaja
N O V	5	Thalattu Ketkuthamma	Raj Kapoor	Prabhu, Kanaka, Mounika, Goundamani, Senthil	Sivaji Productions	Ilaiyaraaja
N O V	22	Putham Pudhu Payanam	K. S. Ravikumar	Anand Babu, Chithra, Chinni Jayanth, Vivek	Super Good Films	Soundaryan
N O V	22	Thangamana Thangachi	Senthilnathan	R. Sarathkumar, Aamani	Ganesh Cine Arts	Shankar–Ganesh
N O V	22	Vaidehi Vandhachu	Radha Bharathi	Saravanan, Archana	Santhini Combines	Deva
N O V	29	Anbulla Thangachikku	Chandranath	Ramesh Aravind, Aishwarya	Anitha Arts	S. A. Rajkumar
N O V	29	Pondatti Sonna Kettukanum	V. Sekhar	Chandrasekhar, Bhanupriya, Goundamani, Senthil	Jayalakshmi Movie Combines	Chandrabose
D E C	6	Aadi Viratham	Rama Narayanan	Nizhalgal Ravi, Sithara	Sri Thenaandal Films	Shankar–Ganesh
D E C	6	Paattondru Ketten	V. C. Guhanathan	Rahman, Sithara	Balasubramaniam & Company (AVM)	Maragadha Mani
D E C	6	Thoothu Po Chellakkiliye	Kasthuri Raja	Varunraj, Vaidehi, Shenbagam	Anbalaya Films	Deva
D E C	13	Kurumbukkaran	Ameerjan	Murali, Suman Ranganathan	Ritham Combines	V. R. Sampath Selvam
D E C	13	Rasathi Varum Naal	Rafi	Nizhalgal Ravi, Kasthuri	Raja Durga Combines	Vijay Anand
D E C	14	Padhai Maariya Payanam	A. Balakrishnan	Sanjay, Veena	Libra Cine Arts	Ilaiyagangai
D E C	20	Ponnukku Sethi Vanthachu	G. P. Ravibabu	Babu, Aishwarya	C. N. B. Cine Creations	Shankar–Ganesh
D E C	20	Thambi Oorukku Pudhusa	R. Umashankar	Anandaraj, Selva, Yuvarani, Goundamani, Senthil	M. P. S. Combines	Deva
D E C	27	Aval	J. V. Rukmangadhan	Rajesh Kumar, Yogapriya	Liyo International	Yuvaraja
D E C	27	Thayamma	Gopi Bhimsingh	Pandiyan, Anand Babu, Babu, Baby Radhu	B. M. S. Cine Arts	Ilaiyaraaja
