= Babu (actor) =

Indian actor (died 2023)

- Born: c. 1963
- Died: 19 September 2023 (aged 60)
- Occupation: Actor
- Years active: 1990–1991

Babu (c. 1963 – 19 September 2023) was an Indian actor who appeared in Tamil films. After making his debut in Bharathiraja's En Uyir Thozhan (1990), Babu appeared in a few more Tamil films before being paralysed following a failed stunt sequence.

== Career ==
Babu made his acting debut in Bharathiraja's 1990 film En Uyir Thozhan, portraying the leading role in a cast featuring rookie actors Thennavan and Rama. About his performance, a critic noted "Babu beautifully essays his character", "understanding the complexities of the character, Babu forcefully brings out the intensity associated with his fanaticism yet never loses the innate guileless nature of Dharma" and "Babu makes the role his own with his body language, unique facial expressions and dialogue delivery". Though the film did not perform well upon release, it has since garnered attention as a "cult classic". He then went on to play the lead role in Vikraman's Perum Pulli (1991) featuring alongside actress Suman Ranganathan and another role in Thayamma (1991). His final release till date was Ponnukku Sethi Vanthachu, which released in late 1991.

Following a stunt sequence gone wrong when shooting for a film named Manasara Vazhthungalen, Babu suffered spinal injuries and became paralysed in the early 1990s. He subsequently stopped working as an actor. In 1997, he worked as a dialogue writer for the unreleased film, Smile Please starring Prakash Raj, which would have marked the debut for filmmaker Radha Mohan. Babu was cast in the role of a disabled nobleman in Kamal Haasan's Marudhanayagam, but the film was shelved in the late 1990s.

In June 2004, director Ponvannan revealed that he was going to make a film based on the life of his friend, Babu, and that he would use the profits from his film Gomathy Nayagam to fund the venture. However, the film eventually did not materialise.

== Death ==
Babu died on 19 September 2023, at the age of 60.

== Filmography ==
Year	Film	Role	Notes
1990	En Uyir Thozhan	Dharma	
1991	Perum Pulli		
1991	Thayamma	Babu	
1991	Ponnukku Sethi Vanthachu		
