= Solaithevanpatti =

Village in Tamil Nadu, India

Coordinates: 9.8930°N 77.4917°E

Solaithevanpatti is a village in Theni, Tamil Nadu, India.
