= En Uyir Thozhan =

1990 film by Bharathiraja

- Title card
- Directed by: Bharathiraja
- Written by: Babu K. S. (dialogues)
- Screenplay by: Bharathiraja
- Story by: P. Kalaimani
- Produced by: P. Jayaraj; S. P. Sigamani
- Starring: Babu; Thennavan; Rama
- Cinematography: B. Kannan
- Edited by: P. Mohanraj
- Music by: Ilaiyaraaja
- Production company: B. R. Art Films
- Release date: 16 February 1990
- Country: India
- Language: Tamil

En Uyir Thozhan (pronounced [en ujiɾ toːɻan] transl. My lifelong friend) is a 1990 Indian Tamil-language political drama film directed by Bharathiraja starring newcomers Babu, Thennavan and Rama. The film was released on 16 February 1990, and failed at the box office; however it garnered a cult following.

== Plot ==
The story follows Dharma (Babu), a fiercely loyal and idealistic political worker living in a Chennai slum, who rescues and falls in love with Chittu (Rama) after she is abandoned by her deceitful lover, Ramesh (Thennavan). Complications arise when Ramesh re-emerges as a rising politician; despite Chittu’s warnings about his true nature, Dharma’s blind allegiance to his party leadership remains unshakeable. In a bid to win public sympathy ahead of elections, the ruthless party bosses orchestrate Dharma's assassination and blame it on their political rivals, concluding the film with the hypocritical leadership staging a grand public tribute for the very worker they sacrificed for political gain.

== Cast ==
- Babu as Dharma
- Thennavan as Ramesh
- Rama as Chittu
- Vadivukkarasi as Dharma's sister
- Livingston as Dilli Babu
- Charle as Pangu

== Production ==
The film marked the acting debuts of newcomers Babu, Thennavan and Rama. Debutant Paari was originally chosen for the role of Dharma which was eventually portrayed by another debutant Babu. It was co-produced by Bharathiraja's brother Jayaraj.

== Soundtrack ==
The music was composed by Ilaiyaraaja, with lyrics by Gangai Amaran. The song "Machi Mannaru" is set in Mayamalavagowla raga.

Track listing
No.	Title	Lyrics	Singer(s)	Length
1.	"Thambi Nee Nimindhu Parada"	Ilaiyaraaja	Ilaiyaraaja	3:02
2.	"Machchi Mannaaru"	Gangai Amaran	Ilaiyaraaja, K. S. Chithra	4:38
3.	"Aeh Raasaaththi"	Gangai Amaran	Malaysia Vasudevan, Arunmozhi	4:54
4.	"Kuyilukuppam"	Gangai Amaran	Malaysia Vasudevan, K. S. Chithra	5:00
Total length:				17:34

== Reception ==
P. S. S. of Kalki praised the performances of the debutants and Vadivukkarasi, as well as the cinematography and called the film hard-hitting.
