= Lovers (1983 film) =

- Directed by: Bharathiraja
- Written by: Inder Raj Anand (dialogues)
- Story by: Manivannan
- Based on: Alaigal Oivathillai (Tamil)/Seethakoka Chilaka (Telugu)
- Produced by: Rajendra Kumar
- Starring: Kumar Gaurav; Padmini Kolhapure; Danny Denzongpa; Tanuja
- Cinematography: B. Kannan
- Edited by: David Dhawan
- Music by: R. D. Burman
- Release date: 6 May 1983
- Country: India
- Language: Hindi

Lovers is a 1983 Indian Hindi-language romantic drama film directed by Bharathiraja. It is a remake of his own simultaneously shot 1981 bilingual titled Alaigal Oivathillai in Tamil and Seethakoka Chilaka in Telugu.

== Plot ==
Viju lives near Panji, Goa, with his poor mother, who teaches music to make a living. Mary, sister of a rich landlord David comes home from Bombay to visit her family during her vacations. The two characters fall in love with each other. On getting to know this, David beats Mary black-and-blue and plans to get her married. During these events, David violates his maid and cleanly gets away with it. But this earns him his wife Eliza's wrath, and she tries to help Mary unite with Viju against the wishes of David.

David then attempts to kill both Viju and Mary with the help of the villagers, as he feels the only punishment that they deserve for loving each other, is death. Will the lovers ever unite, or will they be constantly torn apart due to the various odds and obstacles of the society, is what forms the rest of the story.

== Cast ==
- Kumar Gaurav as Viju
- Padmini Kolhapure as Mary
- Danny Denzongpa as David
- Tanuja as Eliza
- Rajendra Kumar as Christian Priest
- Beena Banerjee as Viju's Mother
- Rakesh Bedi as Fatty
- Mehmood Junior as Viju's Friend
- Neelu Arora as Lalita
- Sudha Chopra as David's Neighbour
- Dinesh Hingoo as Gangu
- Kamaldeep as Doctor
- Satyendra Kapoor as Shambhu

== Soundtrack ==
Song	Singer
"Mohabbat Karnewalon Ko"	Lata Mangeshkar
"Aa, Mulaqaton Ka Mausam Aa Gaya"	Lata Mangeshkar, Amit Kumar
"Zamane Mein Sabse Purani Yahi Pyar Ki Hai Kahani"	Lata Mangeshkar, Amit Kumar
"Kya Husn Hai, Kya Umra Hai"	Amit Kumar
"Aa Paas, Teri Bali Umar Ko"	Amit Kumar
"Tu Mauj, Main Hoon Kinara"	Amit Kumar
