= Erasakkanayakkanur =

Coordinates: 9.790841°N 77.3966°E

Erasakkanayakkanur is a small village located near Theni, Tamil Nadu state, India. It has a population of about 3,600.
