= Winner (2003 film) =

- DVD cover
- Directed by: Sundar C
- Written by: Boopathy Pandian (dialogue)
- Screenplay by: Sundar C
- Story by: Sundar C
- Produced by: Suthan S. Ramachandran
- Starring: Prashanth; Kiran Rathod
- Cinematography: Prasad Murella
- Edited by: P. Sai Suresh
- Music by: Yuvan Shankar Raja
- Production company: Mother India Movies International
- Release date: 27 September 2003
- Running time: 145 minutes
- Country: India
- Language: Tamil

Winner is a 2003 Indian Tamil-language action comedy film written and directed by Sundar C. The film stars Prashanth and Kiran Rathod in the lead roles, while Vadivelu, Vijayakumar, M. N. Nambiar and Riyaz Khan play important supporting roles. The film, which has music scored by Yuvan Shankar Raja and camera work handled by Prasad Murella, released on 27 September 2003 and became a commercial hit. This film is best known for Vadivelu's comedy.

== Plot ==
Sakthi is studying Engineering in a college in Chennai, and gets into quarrels every other day. Not able to withstand the threats from hooligans, his billionaire parents send him to his mother's village in Pollachi where his maternal grandfather Velayutham and grandmother Sivagami reside. Though his grandparents are rich and respected farmers, Sakthi has not met them due to a small dispute between his father and grandfather. In the village, an innocent third cousin of Shakthi, Kaipulla, lives with the old couple with hopes of becoming their heir. He has a small gang and roams around the village with his mates. Kaipulla is constantly challenged by Sakthi's distant relative body-builder Kattadurai, who is also a rich landlord. Sakthi visits his grandparents and decides to stay in the village for a month. A marriage of their relative is planned, and the whole family from all over Tamil Nadu assembles. Neelaveni, who accompanies her relatives, sees Sakthi at the wedding and falls in love with him. Kattadurai is supposed to marry Neelaveni.

Many events follow. Kattadurai often clashes with Sakthi and gets beaten up. Amidst the wedding preparation, a group of former enemies including Vaira Kannan and Neelavani's aunt, along with Neelaveni's father, kidnap Neelaveni. After a huge tussle, Sakthi brings Neelaveni back.

== Cast ==
- Prashanth as Sakthivel Sathyamoorthy
- Kiran Rathod as Neelaveni
- Vadivelu as Kaipulla
- M. N. Nambiar as Velayutham
- Vijayakumar as Sathyamoorthy, Sakthi's father
- M. N. Rajam as Sivagami
- Riyaz Khan as Kattadurai Thevar
- Raj Kapoor as Vaira Kannan
- Jaya Murali as Dhanalakshmi, Sakthi's mother
- Prathap Singh as Santhanapandi Thevar , Neelaveni's father
- Vimalraj as Vaira Kannan's brother
- Anuradha as Neelaveni's aunt
- Santhana Bharathi as Neelaveni's uncle
- Crane Manohar as Kaipulla's sidekick
- Bonda Mani as Kaipulla's sidekick
- Muthukaalai as Kaipulla's sidekick
- Junior Balaiah as Kattadurai's uncle
- Vichu Viswanath as Kattadurai's cousin
- Singamuthu as Thief
- Halwa Vasu as Train Station Master
- Bharathi as Neelaveni's friend
- Thalapathy Dinesh as Neelaveni's bodyguard
- Vatsala Rajagopal as Neelaveni's grandmother
- Shanmugasundari as Neelaveni's grandmother
- Nirosha as Neelaveni's cousin
- Nellai Siva as Astrologer
- Kottai Perumal
- Chelladurai
- Soori as Kaipulla's henchman (uncredited)
- Aarthi Agarwal in "Mathapoo" song (uncredited)

== Production ==
Actor Prashanth signed on to star in the film, being produced by R. Bhooma Ramachandran in late 2001, with Aarthi Aggarwal signed on the play the film's heroine. It was reported that she had impressed actress Khushbu with her performances in Telugu films and Kushboo thus recommended her to her film maker husband, Sundar C. However, she was later replaced by Kiran Rathod and filming for project began as early as January 2002. Despite Aarthi being removed, she can be seen in the beginning of the song "Mathapoo", which was filmed in Trivandrum. The film was primarily shot in and around Chennai, Ilanji and Pollachi, while scenes showcasing a wedding at Kiran's house was shot at Vasan House, Chennai. Prashanth was briefly hospitalised after injuring himself filming an action scene for the film. Vadivelu got injured during a comedy scene at the beginning of the movie shoot.

Despite being completed by the end of 2002, the release of the film was held up after production issues and so the director Sundar C decided to prioritise his work on Kamal Haasan's Anbe Sivam.

== Soundtrack ==
Winner

Soundtrack album by Yuvan Shankar Raja
- Released: 17 March 2003
- Recorded: 2002
- Genre: Feature film soundtrack
- Labels: New Music; Classic Audio
- Producer: Yuvan Shankar Raja

Yuvan Shankar Raja chronology
Pudhiya Geethai (2003)	Winner (2003)	Thennavan (2003)

After Unakkaga Ellam Unakkaga (1998) and Rishi (2000), Sundar C and Yuvan Shankar Raja worked together for the third time for the music composition of this film. The soundtrack, released on 17 March 2003, features 6 tracks with lyrics penned by Pa. Vijay and Viveka.

Track	Song	Singer(s)	Lyrics	Duration
1	"Eye Um Eye Um"	Devan	Pa. Vijay	4:23
2	"Endhan Uyir Thozhiyae"	Udit Narayan	Pa. Vijay	4:38
3	"Mathapoo"	Tippu, Premji Amaran, Sri Vardhini	Pa. Vijay	3:59
4	"Mudhal Murai"	Srinivas, Mahalakshmi Iyer	Pa. Vijay	5:10
5	"Engirundhai"	Harish Raghavendra	Pa. Vijay	4:06
6	"Kozhi Kokkarra"	Udit Narayan, Prashanthini	Viveka	4:25

== Release and reception ==
The film released on 27 September 2003 to positive reviews. Chennai Online wrote "It's a typical Sunder C film, one of his more enjoyable ones, with the right dose of action, sentiment, romance and humour, all weaved into a single film that is engaging and with not many lagging moments. The film makes no pretensions of being a classy affair, but nevertheless it is wholesome entertainment for the entire family. The highlight is the humour generated by the comedy track". A critic noted "It is a typical Sundar C. brand entertainer with comedy, stunts, romance and sentiment thrown in to make the product racy", concluding it was set to be a "box office winner". Another critic also noted "Vadivelu’s comedy is the highlight of the film. He has given a consistent performance in the film". Visual Dasan of Kalki called Vadivelu as man of the match while also praising Kiran's acting and Prashanth's action.

Post-release, the film's producer Ramachandran complained of the treatment he was given by Prashanth and his father during the making of the film. He claimed that the pair demanded extra salary and had initially insisted that the team cast Kareena Kapoor in the lead role. In 2010, the producer spoke of his bankruptcy and blamed Prashanth for his role in the losses he suffered.

Vadivelu's association in the film was titled as 'Varuthapadatha Valibar Sangam', became very famous and it was modified to be used as the title for the 2013 Ponram and Sivakarthikeyan film as Varuthapadatha Valibar Sangam.
