= Ninaikka Therintha Maname =

- Title card
- Directed by: Suresh
- Screenplay by: K. Dinakar
- Based on: Vaazhthum Nenjangal by Manian
- Produced by: Sivanandhan
- Starring: Mohan; Chandrasekhar; Rupini
- Cinematography: Rajarajan
- Edited by: R. G. Gope
- Music by: Ilaiyaraaja
- Production company: Sivadarani Movies
- Release date: 14 August 1987
- Country: India
- Language: Tamil

Ninaikka Therintha Maname (transl. The heart that knows to think) is a 1987 Indian Tamil-language romance film directed by Suresh and written by K. Dinakar. Based on the novel Vaazhthum Nenjangal by Manian, the film stars Mohan, Chandrasekhar and Rupini. It was released on 14 August 1987.

== Cast ==
- Mohan
- Chandrasekhar
- Rupini
- Kallapetti Singaram
- Loose Mohan
- Haja Sheriff
- Idichapuli Selvaraj

== Soundtrack ==
The music was composed by Ilaiyaraaja, with lyrics by Kamakodiyan. Ilaiyaraaja's elder son Karthik Raja, then aged 13, played the keyboard for the song "Kannukkum".

Track listing
No.	Title	Singer(s)	Length
1.	"Kannukkum"	K. J. Yesudas	4:37
2.	"Ilamai"	K. S. Chithra	4:22
3.	"Engengu"	K. J. Yesudas, K. S. Chithra	5:14
4.	"Chinna Chinna Muthu"	K. J. Yesudas, S. Janaki	4:37
5.	"Engengu" (solo)	K. J. Yesudas	5:13
Total length:			24:03

== Release and reception ==
Ninaikka Therintha Maname was released on 14 August 1987. The Indian Express wrote, "The simple knot of the novel is overburdened with songs (especially), and fights. It might have helped if the film was shorter, and the treatment austere and aesthetic". Jayamanmadhan of Kalki found Ilaiyaraaja's music as the only saving grace of the film.
