= Payal Ki Jhankaar =

1980 film

- Film poster
- Directed by: Satyen Bose
- Produced by: Tarachand Barjatya
- Starring: Alankar Joshi
- Music by: Raj Kamal
- Release date: 1980
- Country: India
- Language: Hindi

Payal Ki Jhankaar (transl. Tinkling of Anklets) is a 1980 Indian romance film directed by Satyen Bose. The film was selected as the Indian entry for the Best Foreign Language Film at the 53rd Academy Awards, but was not accepted as a nominee.

== Cast ==
- Alankar Joshi as Gopal Bhatt
- Rupini as Shyama
- Surinder Kaur as Veena
- Veena
- Bandini as Naini
- Shail Chaturvedi as Dinanath
- C. S. Dubey as Shivram - Shyama's uncle
- Sudha Shivpuri as Bhavani - Shyama's aunt

== Music ==
1. "Kaun Gali Gaye Shyam" - Sulakshana Pandit
2. "Bin Gopal" - K. J. Yesudas
3. "Dekho Kanha Nahin" - Sulakshana Pandit, K. J. Yesudas, Hariharan
4. "Ho Rama Pani Bharne" - Anand Kumar, Sulakshana Pandit
5. "Thirkat Ang Lachki Jhuki" - Alka Yagnik (It is the first/debut song of Alka Yagnik)
6. "Sari Dal Dai Mope Rang" - Purushottam Das Jalota, Sulakshana Pandit
7. "Jhirmir Jhirmir Sawan Aaye" - Anand Kumar, Sulakshana Pandit
8. "Jai Maa Ganga" - Chandrani Mukherjee
9. "Jin Khoja Tin Paiyan" - Jaspal Singh
10. "Kar Singaar Aise" - Aarti Mukherjee, Purushottam Jalota, Anand Kumar, Sulakshana Pandit
11. "Nanha Sa Phool" - Sulakshana Pandit
12. "Soor Bin Tan Nahin" - Sulakshana Pandit, Anand Kumar, Purushottam Jalota

== See also ==
- List of submissions to the 53rd Academy Awards for Best Foreign Language Film
- List of Indian submissions for the Academy Award for Best Foreign Language Film
