= Bandhukkal Sathrukkal =

- Directed by: Sreekumaran Thampi
- Written by: Sreekumaran Thampi
- Starring: Jayaram; Mukesh
- Cinematography: K. Ramachandra Babu
- Music by: Sreekumaran Thampi
- Production company: Amriteswari Productions
- Release date: 1993
- Country: India
- Language: Malayalam

Bandhukkal Sathrukkal (transl. Relatives enemies) is a 1993 Indian Malayalam-language comedy drama film, written, directed and produced by Sreekumaran Thampi, who also wrote and composed the songs. The film stars Jayaram, Mukesh, Rohini and Rupini. Both the film and the songs became blockbusters.

== Plot ==
Bandhukkal Sathrukkal is the story of sibling rivalry between Viswabharan and Damodaran, both money lenders. The story is told by Sakshi, who appears in the scene in key moments and directs the story. Elder brother Damodaran's business is booming, whereas younger brother Viswambharan is financially struggling and is an alcoholic. Their wives Kamalakshi and Dakshayani also maintain animosity. Viswabharan's daughter Sheela is struggling with simple schizophrenia. Damodaran has two sons; the elder son Uthaman is assisting father in the business, while the younger son Chandran is kind-hearted and interested in social activism.

Anamala Haridas, a talented but struggling singer arrives in the village searching for his estranged aunt Maniyamma and her daughter, Sakunthala. Haridas falls in love with Sheela in a case of mistaken identity, without realising that she is mentally ill. A relationship develops between Chandran and Sakunthala. When Chandran admits about his relationship with Sakunthala, his dad opposes him. Meanwhile, Uthaman takes advantage of the situation and tells Chandran to sign a document claiming he will not trouble his dad and the family, asking for any support after marriage. Uthaman marries Sugandhi, who is the daughter of Vasu Contractor and in the first day itself, she traps Uthaman in her line.

Chandran goes to Sakunthala's house along with his dad for the marriage fixation, where Damodaran insults her. Hearing this, Haridas raises his voice and says that she is the daughter of the wealthiest man Ananda Kuruppu, who is his uncle and he will make the marriage grand. Chandran marries Sakuntala, after the marriage, Sheela takes the garland of Chandran (who is her cousin) to Haridas's neck and declares herself married, which is approved by the people. Sakuntala gets hugely insulted by Dakshayani, but she stands firm, to which all succumb.

Viswabharan has a huge debt to be cleared and he seeks the help of Vasu Contractor who worked under him, but is left empty handed. One event leads to another and finally Chandran, along with his wife, moves out of his home. Chandran gets to know that his brother has taken away all the property. Viswabharan comes to seek apology from his elder brother, but he dies out of heart attack. Both Chandran and Hari work hard and start earning. Meanwhile, Damodaran gets to know that Vasu contractor has taken over his elder son and gets hugely heartbroken. He gets to know that all his property has been taken away by them and he is left with nothing. Dakshayani is mentally disturbed and has become very violent, as a result she is admitted. In a surprise event, Sheela gets recovered. Damodaran is left with nothing, but Chandran calls back his dad. Meanwhile, their home is auctioned by the bank, which Ananda Kuruppu acquires. In the final scene, it's shown that Damodaran slaps Uthaman and disowns him. Ananda Kuruppu tells him that "Hari and Chandran have taught that there are mistakes done even by old people, hence it's time to move on". When questioned about the updates, he says Sakshi used to give an update. Finally, the movie ends with a beautiful snippet.

== Cast ==
- Jayaram as Anamala Haridas
- Mukesh as Chandran a.k.a. Sahayam Chandran Kunju
- Thilakan as Damodaran
- Narendra Prasad as Viswambharan
- Rohini as Sheela Mol
- Rupini as Sakunthala
- Vadivukkarasi as Dakshayani
- Innocent as Ananda Kurup
- K. P. A. C. Lalitha as Tailor Mani Amma
- Vijayaraghavan as Uthaman
- Oduvil Unnikrishnan as Vasu Contractor, a.k.a. Choriyan Vasu
- Jagathy Sreekumar as Sakshi
- Mamukkoya as Hamsa
- Rizabawa as Asokan, a.k.a. Asokan Chattambi
- Zeenath as Kamalakshi Amma
- Beena Antony as Sugandhi
- Kollam Thulasi as Sugunan
- Paravoor Bharathan as Appukkuttan
- Bobby Kottarakkara as Ramakrishnan
- Kanakalatha as Chellamma
- Thodupuzha Vasanthi as Charumathi
- V. K. Sreeraman as Babu, Psychiatrist

== Soundtrack ==
The music was composed by sreekumaran thampi himself, who debuted as a music director through this film. All songs were sung by K. J. Yesudas and K. S. Chithra, and became chartbusters. The cassettes featuring these songs had a record sale then, having sold one lakh copies within a week after the release. The songs are still very popular among the masses. Sreekumaran Thampi received a golden disc for these songs. The album was released by Magnasound Records. It was only 21 years later that he composed for another film, titled Ammakkoru Tharattu. Until then, he composed songs for many TV serials, all made by himself.

No.	Song	Singers	Lyrics	Length (m:ss)
1	"Bandhuvaaru Sathruvaru"	K. J. Yesudas	Sreekumaran Thampi	04:48
2	"Chumbana Poo Kondu"	K. J. Yesudas	Sreekumaran Thampi	06:30
3	"Malayalee Penne Ninte Manassu"	K. J. Yesudas	Sreekumaran Thampi	05:13
4	"Marukelara"	P. Unnikrishnan	Traditional (Tyagaraja)	06:02
5	"Alappuzha Pattanathil"	K. J. Yesudas	Sreekumaran Thampi	05:16
6	"Pooniram Kandodi Vannu"	K. J. Yesudas, K. S. Chithra	Sreekumaran Thampi	04:45
7	"Thalkkaala Duniyaavu"	K. J. Yesudas	Sreekumaran Thampi	02:46

== Box office ==
The film was commercial success.
