= Allinagaram =

Coordinates: 10°02′N 77°29′E

- Village
- Nickname: Alli
- Location in Tamil Nadu, India
- Country: India
- State: Tamil Nadu
- District: Theni
- Mandal: Madurai

Language
  - Official Language Tamil: Tamil
- Time zone: UTC+5:30 (IST)
- PIN: 625531

Allinagaram is a village in Theni district of the state of Tamil Nadu in India.
