= Mallige Hoove =

- Directed by: Raj Kishor
- Written by: Raj Kishor
- Screenplay by: Raj Kishor
- Based on: Senthoora Poove (Tamil)
- Produced by: S. V. Rajendra Singh Babu
- Starring: Ambareesh; Rupini; Shashikumar
- Cinematography: Ajay Vincent
- Edited by: Joseph
- Music by: Hamsalekha
- Production company: Rohini Pictures
- Release date: 13 November 1992
- Running time: 122 minutes
- Country: India
- Language: Kannada

Mallige Hoove is a 1992 Indian Kannada-language romantic action film directed and written by Raj Kishor and produced by S. V. Rajendra Singh Babu. The film featured Ambareesh, Shashikumar and Rupini in the lead roles. The film's music was composed by Hamsalekha and dialogues written by Chi. Udaya Shankar. This film is an official remake of 1988 Tamil film Senthoora Poove.

== Cast ==
- Ambareesh
- Rupini
- Shashikumar
- Priyanka Puthran
- Sangram Singh
- Vijayalalitha
- Ramakrishna
- Prakash Raj
- M. S. Umesh
- Tennis Krishna
- Dingri Nagaraj

== Soundtrack ==
The music of the film was composed and lyrics written by Hamsalekha.

Track listing
No.	Title	Lyrics	Singer(s)	Length
1.	"Andavo Andavu"	Hamsalekha	K. J. Yesudas & K. S. Chithra
2.	"Baare Cheluve Cheluve"	Hamsalekha	K. J. Yesudas & K. S. Chithra
3.	"Suvvale Suvvale"	Hamsalekha	Ramesh
4.	"Malenaada Mele"	Hamsalekha	Ramesh & Swarnalatha
5.	"Preethi Maador Madhya"	Hamsalekha	K. J. Yesudas & Chandrika Gururaj
6.	"Prayave Vandane"	Hamsalekha	Ramesh & Manjula Gururaj
