= Vaigai (film) =

- Directed by: L. R. Sundarapandi
- Written by: L. R. Sundarapandi
- Produced by: P. P. G. Kumaran; P. P. G. D. Shankar
- Starring: Bala Joseph; Vishaka
- Cinematography: V. Lakshmipathi
- Edited by: K. M. K. Palanivel
- Music by: Sabesh–Murali
- Production company: PPG Enterprises
- Release date: 10 July 2009
- Running time: 140 minutes
- Country: India
- Language: Tamil

Vaigai is a 2009 Indian Tamil-language romantic drama film directed by L.R. Sundarapandi. The film stars Bala Joseph and Vishaka, with Sai Kumar, Thalaivasal Vijay, Ganja Karuppu, Thennavan, Shyam Ganesh, Singamuthu, Appukutty, and Ambani Shankar playing supporting roles. The film had music by Sabesh–Murali, cinematography by V. Lakshmipathi, and editing by K. M. K. Palanivel. The film released on 10 July 2009.

== Plot ==
In a remote village near Madurai, the happy-go-lucky man Arivu (Bala Joseph) and the village belle Uma (Vishaka) fall in love with each other. Arivu is the son of the village bigwig Mandakalai (Sai Kumar), while Uma is the daughter of the postman Manikkam (Thalaivasal Vijay). When Mandakalai knew about his son's love affair, he sends his cousin Duraisingam (Thennavan) and his henchmen to kill Uma, but Arivu saves her. The lovers consume poison and go separated, getting into different trains moving at opposite directions. Arivu is then admitted to the hospital and saved by the doctors. Mandakalai's henchmen cannot find the missing girl Uma, and the villagers conclude that she died.

The heartbroken Arivu with his friends moves to Chennai to try to forget this mishap. One day, Arivu's friends witness Uma in a temple, but Dr. Shyam (Shyam Ganesh) tells them that she is not Uma, thinking that they might be Mandakalai's henchmen. Uma is now living in Shyam's house but is afraid of returning home, so Shyam invites her parents at his home. When Uma and her parents return to their village, they come to know that Arivu committed suicide. Arivu was moved after the "death" of his lover, but he acted happy and positive to his friends and family. Uma is aghast to hear this news, and she decides to not get married. Every year, at the death anniversary of her lover, Uma places flower garlands at the burial place of Arivu.

== Cast ==
- Bala Joseph as Arivu
- Vishaka as Uma
- Sai Kumar as Mandakalai, Arivu's father
- Thalaivasal Vijay as Manikkam, Uma's father
- Ganja Karuppu as Jeevarasi
- Thennavan as Duraisingam
- Shyam Ganesh as Dr. Shyam
- Singamuthu as Muthurasu
- Appukutty as Kulumai
- Shankar
- Theni Murugan as Bus Conductor
- Rajasekhar
- V. M. Subburaj
- Chellakoori
- Vijay Ganesh
- Amirthalingam
- Sai Gopi
- Yuvan Swang
- Madurai Saroja
- Anjali Devi
- Sujibala in a special appearance
- Ragasya in a special appearance in the song "Nan Unaku Niagara"

== Production ==
L. R. Sundarapandi made his directorial debut with Vaigai, a film based on some real-life incidents that happened in Madurai which took place in the 1980s. Bala Joseph, the winner of the second season of Maanada Mayilada, was chosen to play the hero while newcomer Swasika (credited as Vishaka) from Kerala was selected to play a character based on a real life person. Ganja Karuppu played a major role. The film was shot in Pollachi, Madurai and Chennai.

== Soundtrack ==
Vaigai

Soundtrack album by Sabesh–Murali
- Released: 2009
- Recorded: 2009
- Genre: Feature film soundtrack
- Length: 30:16
- Producer: Sabesh–Murali

The film score and the soundtrack were composed by Sabesh–Murali. The soundtrack features six tracks with lyrics written by Snehan, Na. Muthukumar, and L. R. Sundarapandi. The song "Aayiram Thamarai" from Alaigal Oivathillai (1981) was re-recorded and reused in the film.

Track	Song	Singer(s)	Duration
1	"Aayiram Thamarai"		4:20
2	"Aasaiyai Kadi"		5:07
3	"Ean Kavithai"		5:47
4	"Nan Unaku Niagara"	Silambarasan	4:22
5	"Nila Nila Vaa"		5:36
6	"Yetho Yetho"		5:04

== Release and reception ==
The film was released on 10 July 2009 alongside four other films.

A critic from The New Indian Express wrote, "The film picks up pace and some interest towards the latter part, the emotional climax touching a chord".
