= Alaigal Oivathillai =

1981 film by Bharathiraja

- Theatrical release poster
- Directed by: Bharathirajaa
- Screenplay by: Bharathirajaa
- Story by: Manivannan
- Produced by: R. D. Bhaskar
- Starring: Karthik; Radha
- Cinematography: B. Kannan
- Edited by: R. Bhaskaran
- Music by: Ilaiyaraaja
- Production company: Pavalar Creations
- Release date: 18 July 1981
- Running time: 138 minutes
- Country: India
- Language: Tamil

Alaigal Oivathillai (transl. Waves never cease) is a 1981 Indian Tamil-language teen romantic drama film directed by Bharathiraja, from a story by Manivannan. The film stars Karthik and Radha, in their acting debuts. Thiagarajan, Silk Smitha and Kamala Kamesh appear in supporting roles. The story follows a Hindu boy who falls in love with a Christian girl. How the lovers unite braving all the obstacles, forms the crux of the story.

The story and screenplay were written by Manivannan and Bharathiraja, respectively. The cinematography was handled by B. Kannan, and editing was handled by R. Bhaskaran while the music was composed by Ilaiyaraaja. The film was simultaneously shot along with its Telugu version titled Seethakoka Chilaka (1981) where Karthik and Smitha reprised their roles. Filming took place entirely in Muttom, Kanyakumari.

Alaigal Oivathillai was released on 18 July 1981 to mainly positive reviews and became a commercial success. The film received eight Tamil Nadu State Film Awards, including Best Film, Best Director and Best Story Writer. It was remade by Bharathiraja in Hindi as Lovers in 1983.

== Plot ==
Vichu, a laidback teenager from an orthodox Brahmin family, lives with his widowed mother, a classical music teacher, in a coastal village. Mary, a modern Christian girl studying in a nearby town, returns to the village after finishing her examinations, where her wealthy brother David lives with his wife Elissy. David is ruthless, arrogant and feared by the villagers. However, he is extremely protective of his sister. Once when she sings with her friends, Vichu and his friends mock her singing skills. Feeling insulted, she decides to learn singing, obtains permission from David and enrolls in music classes under Vichu's mother.

Mary soon excels and gets the appreciation of Vichu's mother. Vichu gets impressed with Mary's perseverance and when she sings a song exceedingly well, he loses his heart to her. He starts pursuing her and expresses his love. Mary, however, avoids him and goes to the extent of slapping him. But she soon realizes that she too is in love with him.

The relationship between Vichu and Mary grows and they become very close to each other without their families knowing. Two children playing on the beach see Vichu and Mary romancing; one of them informs her mother, who in turn informs Elissy about their affair. Elissy berates Mary for courting a non-Christian and warns her of the consequences, should David learn. Elissy prevents Mary from leaving her house, instead arranging for Vichu's mother to teach her there. Vichu and Mary start exchanging messages written on paper pieces tucked in the harmonium. Despite Elissy's control, Mary manages to meet Vichu. Vichu's mother accidentally sees a note in the harmonium and cautions Vichu. However, he explains his true love and seeks her support.

Mary gets admission in a city college, but her love for Vichu prompts her to adopt ingenious techniques to fall ill to enable her to get excuses to cancel the trip. Vichu's friends say the best way to resolve the matter is by proposing formally. Vichu and his friends visit David at his house and propose Vichu's marriage with Mary; David angrily refuses, beats Mary and berates Elissy for being irresponsible. He then locks up Mary and vows to stop her love affair with Vichu.

During the course of events, David gets aroused by his servant Mari's wife undressing, enters her bath hut (which had no door lock) and rapes her. Elissy who sees the whole thing is too afraid to stop David and she frantically tries to divert Mari's attention to avoid exposing David and thereby shaming her family. Though he is caught in the act, David cleanly gets away due to his clout and Mari and his wife, realizing David's power and influence in the village quietly leave the house, after sarcastically telling David that he had already 'repaid' them for their loyalty, and Elissy — rather than they — should be given the final payment for coolie services rendered, for standing 'guard' so faithfully during the shameful act.

Hurt by the barbed comment but knowing she did wrong and enraged at David's lack of remorse and callousness when she confronted him about the rape, Elissy now turns against David. She decides to help Mary, who truly loves Vichu and helps Mary meet Vichu secretly. David, who comes to know of this, decides to get Mary married to a relative in a hurry. The priest at the local church meets David and advises him to understand true love and support the young lovers, but David disagrees as he feels religion is more important than emotions. Elissy is against his plan, and advises Mary to meet Vichu and decide their future.

Mary and Vichu decide not to run away, but to live in the same village. When they are together, David ends up beating Vichu and his friends, takes Mary away and speeds up the process of her forced marriage. When Mary is determined to marry Vichu, Elissy takes her to Vichu's house and hands her over to his mother. Though Vichu's mother is apprehensive, she does not wish to abort their love and accepts Mary. However, David and his people arrive; Vichu's mother asks him and Mary to run away to a safer place. They both run away but remain at the beach. The night passes with protection from their friends. David meets the villagers and provokes them for allowing a Hindu to elope with a Christian. All the villagers join him and come to attack the lovers the next morning.

Vichu and Mary notice the armed crowds coming and decide to face them. An armed David comes to attack Vichu, but is stopped by the priest who advises David to be a human and respect love. David insists that as a true Christian he will not allow Mary to marry a non-Christian as long as she is Christian. In response, Vichu and Mary renounce their respective religions, much to the shock of David and the villagers, then walk away. Vichu's friends celebrate the lovers' newfound happiness and peace.

== Cast ==
- Karthik as Vichu
- Radha as Mary
- Thiagarajan as David
- Silk Smitha as Elissy
- Kamala Kamesh as Vichu's mother
- Mohamad as Vagai
- Deepak
- Yunes
- Ranga
- Ramesh
- Purushothaman
- Periya Karuppu Thevar as Mari
- Renu Chandra as Mari's wife
- Vellai Subbaiah
- Suresh Chakravarthy

== Production ==
Alaigal Oivathillai is the first film produced by R. D. Bhaskar through the company Pavalar Creations. Bava Lakshmanan, who had finished the ninth grade, initially screen tested for the film before Karthik was selected. Karthik and Radha made their acting debut with this film. When Karthik's father, actor Muthuraman asked Karthik if he would accept the film, Karthik readily agreed without giving it a second thought. Suresh said he was also approached for the role but he opted to do Panneer Pushpangal. Bharathiraja had also contemplated casting Murali in the lead role, but ultimately did not do so. Thiagarajan, who was then working as regional manager of Polydor, made his acting debut with the film.

Filming began in February 1981. None of the three actors recorded their dialogues in their own voices; Karthik's voice was dubbed by S. N. Surendar, Radha's by Anuradha and Thiagarajan's by Bharathiraja. The film was shot entirely in Muttom, Kanyakumari. For the song "Aayiram Thamarai", Bharathiraja wanted a set with swaying lotuses, for which assistant directors Manobala and Manivannan "ran from pillar to post to get it ready". According to Manobala, "We peeled off a plantain sheath and stuck lotus stems to it. Then, both of us raised and swayed the lotus flowers from underwater".

== Soundtrack ==
The music was composed by Ilaiyaraaja. The song "Vizhiyil Vizhundhu", set to the Carnatic raga Suddha Dhanyasi, was composed within 10 minutes while the other songs were composed within half an hour. The song "Putham Pudhu Kaalai", set to Natabhairavi, was originally recorded for a film titled Maruthani to be directed by Mahendran. As that film was shelved, the song was included on the LP records of Alaigal Oivathillai, but it was not featured in the film itself. The flute portions in the song were performed by Sudhakar. It was later remastered for Megha (2014), in which Ilaiyaraaja was also the composer. The song was also reused as "Halke Se Bole" in the Hindi film Paa (2009), and was sampled for a Kissan Fruit Kick commercial. The song "Kadhal Oviyam" was reused as "Meri Zindagi" in the Hindi film Aur Ek Prem Kahani (1996), which was also composed by Ilaiyaraaja. The song "Aayiram Thamarai", set to Shubhapantuvarali, was reused in Vaigai (2009). The song "Vaadi En Kappa Kelange" was remixed by Dhina in Sandai (2008).

Track listing
No.	Title	Lyrics	Singer(s)	Length
1.	"Aayiram Thaamarai"	Vairamuthu	S. P. Balasubrahmanyam, S. Janaki	4:30
2.	"Darisanam Kidaikaathaa" (Female)	Vairamuthu	S. Janaki	1:12
3.	"Darisanam Kidaikaathaa" (Male)	Vairamuthu	Ilaiyaraaja	1:50
4.	"Kaadhal Oviyam" (Version 1)	Panchu Arunachalam	Ilaiyaraaja, Jency Anthony	4:38
5.	"Kaadhal Oviyam" (Version 2)	Panchu Arunachalam	Ilaiyaraaja, Jency Anthony	1:51
6.	"Lambodhara"	Ilaiyaraaja	S. Janaki	0:53
7.	"Puththam Pudhu Kaalai"	Gangai Amaran	S. Janaki	4:34
8.	"Sa Ri Ga Ma Pa"	Ilaiyaraaja	Guruvayoor Rajam, S. Janaki	2:03
9.	"Thoththiram Paadiye"	Ilaiyaraaja	Ilaiyaraaja, B. S. Sasirekha	0:47
10.	"Vaadi En Kappa Kelange"	Gangai Amaran	Ilaiyaraaja, Gangai Amaran, Bhaskaran, Jency Anthony	4:45
11.	"Vaazhvellaam Aanandame"	Ilaiyaraaja	Ilaiyaraaja, S. Janaki	1:27
12.	"Vizhiyil Vizhundhu"	Vairamuthu	Ilaiyaraaja, B. S. Sasirekha	4:03
Total length:				32:33

== Release and reception ==
Alaigal Oivathillai was released on 18 July 1981. In a review dated 2 August 1981, the Tamil magazine Ananda Vikatan rated the film 50 out of 100. Sindhu-Jeeva of Kalki praised Kannan's cinematography, Ilaiyaraaja's music, editing and the climax for creating excitement and concluded calling it another colourful painting by Bharathiraja highlighting love. The then Chief Minister of Tamil Nadu, M. G. Ramachandran applauded the performance of Smitha, and encouraged her to perform more similar roles.

== Accolades ==
Alaigal Oivathillai won eight Tamil Nadu State Film Awards. They were Best Film, Best Director (Bharathiraja), Best Music Director (Ilaiyaraaja), Best Lyricist (Vairamuthu), Best Cinematographer (B. Kannan), Best Story Writer (Manivannan), Best Debut Actor Male (Karthik) and Best Debut Actor Female (Radha).

== Other versions ==
Alaigal Oivathillai was simultaneously shot along with its Telugu version titled Seethakoka Chilaka by Bharathiraja himself with Karthik and Smitha reprising their roles, which was released one month later. Bharathiraja remade it in Hindi as Lovers in 1983.

== Bibliography ==
- Dhananjayan, G. (2011). The Best of Tamil Cinema, 1931 to 2010: 1977–2010. Galatta Media. OCLC 733724281.
- Sundararaman (2007) [2005]. Raga Chintamani: A Guide to Carnatic Ragas Through Tamil Film Music (2nd ed.). Pichhamal Chintamani. OCLC 295034757.
