= Veerayi Makkal =

Indian drama film

- Theatrical release poster
- Directed by: Nagaraj Karuppaiah
- Written by: Nagaraj Karuppaiah
- Produced by: Suresh Nandha
- Starring: Suresh Nandha; Nandana Anand
- Cinematography: M. Seenivasan
- Edited by: Mugan Vel
- Music by: Deepan Chakravarthy
- Production company: White Screen Films
- Release date: 9 August 2024
- Country: India
- Language: Tamil

Veerayi Makkal (transl. Brave people) is a 2024 Indian Tamil-language drama film written and directed by Nagaraj Karuppaiah. The film stars Suresh Nandha and Nandana Anand. Dubbed in Telugu Language as Veeramma Prajalu.

== Cast ==
- Suresh Nandha as Ayyanar
- Nandana Anand as Eshwari
- Vela Ramamoorthy as Maruthamuthu
- G. Marimuthu as Balu
- Deepa Shankar as Vadivu
- Rama as Sornam
- Senthi Kumari as Angamma
- Gerald Milton as Selvaraj
- Pandi Akka

== Production ==
The film was produced by Suresh Nandha under the banner of A White screen films.The cinematography was done by M.Seenivasan while editing was handled by Mugan Vel and music composed by Deepan Chakravarthy.

== Reception ==
Hindu Tamil Thisai critic rated two point five out of five star and wrote that "Director Nagaraj Karupiya shakes the memories of the audience by telling through the characters of Veerai - his daughter-in-law Sornam, how every woman spreads love throughout her life in many relational positions like sister, mother, mother-in-law".

Sreejith Mullappilly of Cinema Express rated one point five out of five and wrote that "The film sets up its premise reasonably well, but the treatment makes its simple moments seem unnecessarily grandiose. It delivers the resolutions in an equally straightforward way as well." Maalai Malar rated two point five star and Virakesari rated two star.
