= Bahaar =

- LP Vinyl Records Cover
- Directed by: Suraj Prakash
- Starring: Raj Kiran; Rupini
- Music by: Manoj–Gyan
- Release date: 1988
- Language: Hindi

Bahaar is a 1988 Indian Hindi-language film directed by Suraj Prakash, starring Raj Kiran and Rupini .

== Cast ==
- Raj Kiran as Ram
- Rupini
- Raza Murad
- Ashalata

== Music ==
1. " Baahon Mein Aasmaan Le Chala" – Asha Bhosle
2. "Humsafar Ban Ke Humdum" – Alka Yagnik, Suresh Wadkar
3. "Main Paani Mein Bheegi Aise" – Asha Bhosle
4. "Tumko Jabse Kareeb Dekha Hai" – Alka Yagnik, Bhupinder Singh
5. "Zulfon Ka Andhera Hai" – Penaz Masani
