= Rama (actress) =

Indian actress (born 1968)

- Born: Shanthi; Pudukkottai, Tamilnadu
- Years active: 1990; 2010-present
- Spouse(s): Venkatesh (m. 1991–present)
- Children: 2
- Relatives: Vizhuthugal Serial Latha (Younger sister)

Rama is an Indian actress who appeared in the Tamil film industry in 1990. After her marriage in 1991, she stopped acting in movies and settled with her husband Venkatesh and two sons. However she made a film comeback in the 2010 movie Aval Peyar Thamizharasi in mother roles and also acting with other supporting roles and TV serials.

== Career ==
Shanthi was a volleyball player for the Tamil Nadu team when director Bharathiraja cast her in En Uyir Thozhan (1990). The failure of the film prompted her to stop appearing in Tamil films.

She made a brief return in 2010, playing a mother role in Aval Peyar Thamizharasi before earning critical acclaim as Karthi’s feisty, possessive mother in Pa. Ranjith’s Madras (2014). She has since also been a part of A. R. Murugadoss’ Kaththi (2014), where she played Vijay’s mother, and the political drama Purampokku Engira Podhuvudamai (2015). She also acted in television serials such as Bharathiraja's Appanum Athaalum which was telecast on Kalaignar TV and also in serials Avalum Penn Thaane and Kanavarukaaga which were telecast on Sun TV.

== Personal life ==
Rama married Venkatesh in 1991. The couple have two sons.

== Filmography ==
Year	Film	Role	Notes
1990	En Uyir Thozhan	Chittu	
1990	Anthi Varum Neram	Latha	
1990	Ladies Hostel	Geetha	
2010	Aval Peyar Thamizharasi	Tamizharasi's mother	
2011	Minsaram	Ilavarasu's mother	
2011	Maithanam	Sukumar and Shanthi's mother	
2011	Pillaiyar Theru Kadaisi Veedu	Valli's mother	
2011	Mambattiyan	Kannathaal's mother	
2012	Vavval Pasanga		
2014	Madras	Kaali's mother	
2014	Kaththi	Jeeva's mother	
2015	Purampokku Engira Podhuvudamai	Yamalingam's mother	
2016	Avan Aval		
2016	Kabali	Mallika	
2016	Thirunaal	Vithya's mother	
2017	Senjittale En Kadhala	Veera's mother	
2017	Kootathil Oruthan	Arvind's mother	
2017	Podhuvaga Emmanasu Thangam	Ganesh's mother	
2017	Kurangu Bommai	Kathir's mother	
2018	Kanaa	Savitri, Kousalya's mother	
2018	Mohini	Mohini's mother	
2019	Vaandu		
2019	Natpuna Ennanu Theriyuma	Shiva's mother	
2019	Jiivi	Sivagami	
2019	Kazhugu 2	Merly's mother	
2019	Namma Veettu Pillai	Maniyakkarar's wife	
2019	Bigil	Angel's mother	
2019	Irandam Ulagaporin Kadaisi Gundu	Selvam's mother	
2021	Naanum Single Thaan	Udhay's mother	
2021	Vettai Naai		
2021	Sulthan	Villager	
2021	Kasada Thapara	Kanmani's mother	Streaming release
2021	Sabhaapathy	Saavithri's mother	
2021	Sivaranjiniyum Innum Sila Pengalum		
2021	3:33	Kathir's mother	
2022	Veetla Vishesham	Unni's sister	
2022	Yaanai	Jebarani	
2022	Jiivi 2	Sivagami	
2023	Ariyavan		
2023	Parking	Selvi	
2024	Devil	Hema's mother	
2024	Veppam Kulir Mazhai	Pottu	
2024	Veerayi Makkal	Sornam	
2024	Sir		
2024	Miss You	Jothi	
2025	Perusu	Kamala	
2026	Angikaaram	Aathiran's mother	

=== Television ===
Year	Program Name	Role	Network	Notes
2023	Engga Hostel	Lecturer	Amazon Prime Video	
2023–present	Singapennae	Pechiyamma	Sun TV	
2023	Label	Prabha's mother	Disney+ Hotstar	
