= B. Kannan =

Indian cinematographer (1951–2020)

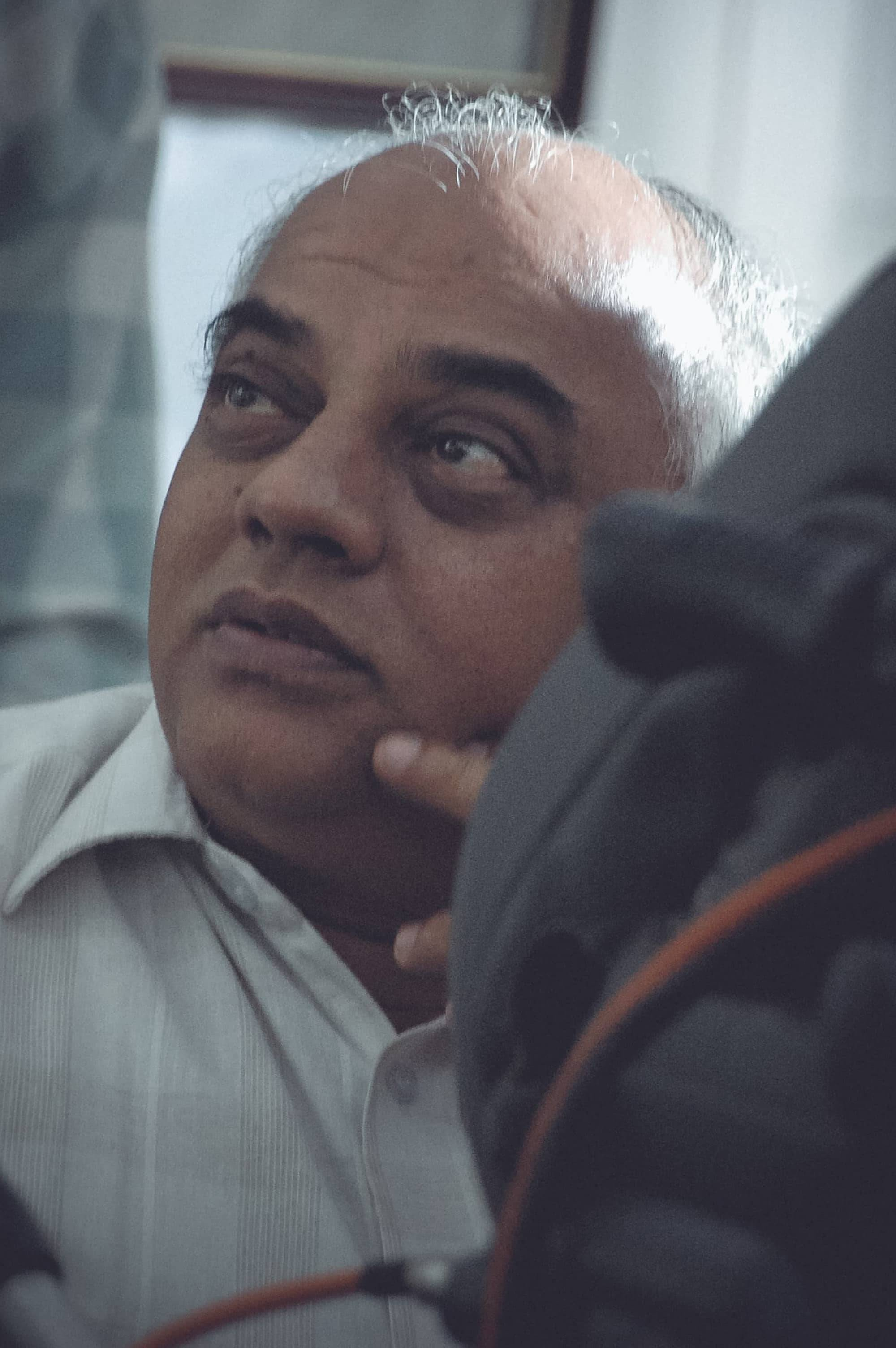
- Born: Bhimsingh Kannan; 10 January 1951; Madras, Tamil Nadu, India
- Died: 13 June 2020 (aged 69)
- Occupations: Actor; Cinematographer
- Years active: 1980–2018
- Spouse: Kanchana Kannan
- Relatives: A. Bhimsingh (father); B. Lenin (brother)

Bhimsingh Kannan (10 January 1951 – 13 June 2020) was an Indian cinematographer and actor who worked in Tamil and Malayalam films. He was known for his association with director Bharathiraja and was referred to as "Bharathirajavin Kangal" (Bharathiraja's Eyes).

== Personal life ==
Kannan was the son of film-maker A. Bhimsingh and the younger brother of editor B. Lenin. He was married to Kanchana and has two daughters namely Madhumathi Kannan and Janani Kannan.

== Career ==
Kannan was known for his recurrent association with Bharathiraja.

== Filmography ==
=== Tamil ===
- Oru Nadigai Natakam Parkiral (1978)
- Nizhalgal (1980)
- Alaigal Oivathillai (1981)
- Tik Tik Tik (1981)
- Kaadhal Oviyam (1982)
- Valibamey Vaa Vaa (1982)
- Mann Vasanai (1983)
- Pudhumai Penn (1984)
- Muthal Mariyathai (1985)
- Oru Kaidhiyin Diary (1985)
- Kadalora Kavithaigal (1986)
- Vedham Pudhithu (1987)
- Kodi Parakuthu (1988)
- Solla Thudikuthu Manasu (1988)
- Soora Samhaaram (1988)
- En Uyir Thozhan (1990)
- Pudhu Nellu Pudhu Naathu (1991)
- Knock-Out (1992; short film)
- Nadodi Thendral (1992)
- Captain Magal (1993) (uncredited)
- Kizhakku Cheemayile (1993)
- Karuththamma (1994) (uncredited)
- Priyanka (1994)
- Pasumpon (1995) (uncredited)
- Senathipathi (1996)
- Taj Mahal (1999)
- Kadal Pookkal (2001)
- Looty (2001)
- Kangalal Kaidhu Sei (2003)
- Vishwa Thulasi (2004)
- Ayul Regai (2005)
- Uliyin Osai (2008)
- Uchithanai Muharnthaal (2011)

=== Malayalam ===
- Rappadikalude Gatha (1978)
- Iniyaval Urangatte (1978)
- Niram Marunna Nimishangal (1982)
- Vasudha (1992)
- Oru Yathramozhi (1997)

=== Telugu ===
- Pagadala Padava (1979)
- Kotha Jeevithalu (1981)
- Seethakoka Chiluka (1981)
- Aradhana (1987)
- Jamadagni (1988)

=== Hindi ===
- White Rainbow (2005)
- Final Cut of Director (2016)

=== Actor ===
Films

- Kangalal Kaidhu Sei (2008) as John Vaseegaran's family friend
- Uliyin Osai (2008) as monk

Television

Year	Title	Role	Channel	Language
2017–2018	Azhagu	Kannan	Sun TV	Tamil

== Awards ==
He won the Shantaram Award for Best Cinematography for his work in Kadal Pookkal in 2001. He was also a recipient of the Tamil Nadu State Film Award for Best Cinematographer twice for Alaigal Oivathillai (1981) and Kangalal Kaidhu Sei (2004).

== Death ==
Kannan died on 13 June 2020 at the age of 69 due to heart complications.
