= Ayul Regai =

- Directed by: K. G. Ashok
- Written by: K. G. Ashok
- Starring: Thennavan; Sriji; Gayathri
- Cinematography: B. Kannan; Azhagiya Manavalan
- Music by: Abbas Rafi
- Release date: 22 July 2005
- Country: India
- Language: Tamil
- Budget: ₹50 lakh

Ayul Regai (transl. Lifeline) is a 2005 Indian Tamil language psychological thriller film directed by K. G. Ashok in his debut, starring Thennavan in his lead debut.

== Cast ==
- Thennavan as Karikalan
- Shriji
- Gayatri
- Gurudutt as a psychiatrist
- Isac as Shatru
- Santhana Bharathi
- Vishwa

== Production ==
Ayul Regai is the directorial debut of Ashok. Made on a budget of within ₹50 lakh (equivalent to ₹1.7 crore or US$180,000 in 2023), it was filmed at locations in Nagapattinam and Kodiakarai and completed within 18 days. Thennavan, who previously played supporting or cameo roles, made his debut as the lead actor.

== Music ==
The music was composed by Abbas Rafi.

Track listing
No.	Title	Lyrics	Singer(s)	Length
1.	"Kolaikkari Vara"	Ekadasi	Abbas Ravi, Karil Karunanidhi	6:46
2.	"Oh Manithaney"	Raju Murugan	Karthik	3:55
3.	"Theme Music 2"	Yugabharathi	N. S. Aruna	3:25
4.	"Ucham Thalayil"	Yugabharathi	Sreeram, Renjith	5:08
5.	"Uyiril Thee Thee"	Ekadasi	Sreeram	3:40
Total length:				22:54

== Reception ==
Malini Mannath of Chennai Online appreciated the digital cinematography, music and editing, viewing it favourably as a tribute to M. Night Shyamalan's films. Malathi Rangarajan of The Hindu gave the film a more negative review, saying "Ashok seems to have got so involved in his story that he hasn't given a thought to the layman in the cinema hall who needs to comprehend what's going on".
