= Kangalal Kaidhu Sei =

- DVD cover
- Directed by: Bharathiraja
- Written by: Sujatha (Dialogues)
- Screenplay by: Bharathiraja
- Story by: S. Premnath
- Produced by: K. Muralitharan; V. Swaminathan
- Starring: Vaseegaran; Priyamani
- Cinematography: B. Kannan
- Edited by: K. Pazhanivel
- Music by: A. R. Rahman
- Production company: Lakshmi Movie Makers
- Release date: 20 February 2004
- Country: India
- Language: Tamil

Kangalal Kaidhu Sei (transl. Arrest Me with Your Eyes) is a 2004 Indian Tamil-language romantic thriller film directed by Bharathiraja and co-written by Sujatha. The film stars Vaseegaran and Priyamani. The film marks Priyamani's debut in Tamil cinema and the only Tamil film appearance of Sri Lankan actor Sanath Gunathilake. The film revolves around a young, wealthy kleptomaniac's quest to find the love of his dreams in a young woman who is tasked with retrieving a stolen diamond from him.

The cinematography was done by B. Kannan, while editing was done by K. Pazhanivel. The music was scored by A. R. Rahman. Kangalal Kaidhu Sei was released on 19 February 2004.

== Plot ==
John Vaseegaran is a young man who ranks as the 5th richest man in India and 30th in the world. In business, his biggest rival is Pratap, who was previously a rival to Vasee's parents. The plot opens in a graveyard where Vasee's parents' funeral takes place. However, Vasee is not disturbed by their deaths, as they never showed him affection and focused only on building their business and making money. A lady attending the funeral expresses her condolences to Vasee and leaves. While getting into her car, she finds that her diamond ring is missing and starts shouting. Pratap, who is also present, hears her. Vasee quietly takes out the ring from his pocket and puts it back.

At 21, Vasee inherits his parents' property and becomes the chairman of 42 companies. However, he is unhappy and desires motherly affection. He is also a kleptomaniac. He consults his family doctor for a solution. The doctor instructs him to find love, which makes him dream of a loving, maternal figure named "Cinderella" based on the fairytale character of the same name.

Vidhya, a young woman working in a shopping mall run by Pratap, sees Vasee stealing a crystal from the shopping mall. Later, a diamond exhibition is organized, where Pratap exhibits his special diamond with 16 reflecting faces, worth ₹10 crore. The diamond is under Vidhya's responsibility. She notices Vasee at the exhibition and becomes alert. Shortly after, Vasee steals the diamond despite tight security and leaves. Vidhya is questioned by the police and charged with theft. Under interrogation, Vidhya remembers Vasee's presence and relates the old incident of the crystal theft. She immediately realizes Vasee is the thief and tells the police, but they do not believe her as he is wealthy. However, Pratap believes her as he remembers the graveyard ring theft. In fact, Pratap himself once lost a golden wristlet while shaking Vasee's hand.

As per Pratap's plan, Vidhya enters Vasee's home as his personal secretary. Vasee asks her to dress in modern attire, and she does so. He sees his dream girl Cinderella in Vidhya and starts developing a love for her, but she is not interested in him. Meanwhile, Vidhya searches for the diamond and spots it in a big fish tank. Soon, she is asked to accompany Vasee to the airport, where he is to take a plane to attend a meeting. Vidhya suddenly disappears when she notices Vasee's doctor. Soon, Vasee also rushes home when the doctor tells him that Vidhya and a police officer named Premkumar met him for an inquiry about Vasee. At home, he sees the broken fish tank and understands that Vidhya took the diamond. Vidhya is happy because she is relieved from the first charge but is soon charged again for theft.

It turns out that the diamond Vidhya took from Vasee is not the original, but a fake made out of crystal. Pratap demands that Vidhya have an illicit relationship with him in return for her discharge from the case. Vidhya rushes to Vasee and pleads with him to return the diamond, as it destroys her future and life. She expresses that she cannot be in love with him or marry him. Then Premkumar arrives, reveals to Vasee that he is Vidhya's fiancé, and threatens to get him caught and jailed. However, Vidhya undergoes torture under police custody for her second charge, and Premkumar is rendered powerless in proving Vidhya's innocence. Then Vasee bails Vidhya from police custody and demands that she be his Cinderella for five days in Switzerland as punishment for attacking him psychologically with love as a weapon. He assures no physical contact, only love. Vidhya initially refuses, but because of pressure from Premkumar to save his position, she agrees to go with Vasee.

At the Swiss airport, Vidhya bumps into Kailash, an Interpol officer. Vasee takes her to his Swiss residence and introduces her to his friends, teachers, and others. Then, he and Vidhya pose for photographs. That night, Vidhya has a nightmare of Vasee misbehaving with her. The next day, she breaks one of his photographs out of frustration. Later that day, Vasee sees Vidhya talking to Kailash from a distance. When he enters, he sees the broken photograph. Vasee confronts Vidhya and screams at her that it is his family photo and that she has no right to break it. The next day, Kailash finds Vasee alone at a church talking to himself. Later, he is similarly spotted alone on a hilltop. Likewise, on the fourth day, he is seen talking to himself on a boat on Lake Thun.

Kailash quickly informs the officers in India and Switzerland. They immediately rush to Vasee's home to rescue Vidhya, but they find only the dead bodies of Vasee and Vidhya dressed in groom and bride costumes. They also find Pratap's diamond placed on Vidhya's coffin. Vasee actually slapped Vidhya on the day she broke his photograph. Unexpectedly, she died after dashing into a heavy stone, after which Vasee dressed her body in a bridal gown and preserved her in a coffin. As soon as the cops arrive on the fifth day, Vasee, dressed in a groom's suit, shoots himself with his golden gun. The cops also see a note on the top of Vidhya's coffin, in which Vasee instructs the authorities to spend his property in the name of Cinderella Trust to help the poor and needy.

== Cast ==
- Vaseegaran as John Vaseegaran
- Priyamani as Vidhya/Cinderella
- Sanath Gunathilake as Pratap
- Akash as Premkumar
- Mayilsamy as Barber
- Chitra Lakshmanan as Subramaniam
- S. Premnath as James
- Theni Murugan as Vanadurai
- V. Swaminathan as Kailash
- B. Kannan as Vasee's family friend
- G. K. as DGP
- Laxmi Rattan as Dominic Louis Mariadas
- Ilavarasu as Vasee's servant (uncredited role)

== Production ==
Bharathiraja had initially selected Rathi Arumugam to play the lead role, but she was later dropped from the project. Priyamani, who worked as a model for various advertisements, was subsequently selected for the role after a series of screen tests and the film marked her debut in Tamil cinema. Vaseegaran from Palladam, whose birth name is Fazal Ahmed, also worked as a model before being selected for his role through screen tests. He was given the screen name Vaseegaran when he made his debut in this film. Both Vaseegaran and Priyamani were positively reviewed for their respective performances in the film.

The climax scene was shot in Switzerland and so were a couple of songs. One of the songs was picturised at the airport, where Vaseegaran and Priyamani took part. Earlier, a 36 days' shooting schedule was held at Sri Lanka. After this the unit shifted to locations in Chennai and Ooty.

== Soundtrack ==
The soundtrack was composed by A. R. Rahman inhis fifth and final collaboration with Bharathiraja. The soundtrack includes an introductory speech by Bharathiraja. The audio was launched at Sathyam Cinemas on 2 December 2003. The soundtrack got critical acclaim and immediate praise. Malayalam composer Johnson made his playback debut in this film.

Song	Singer(s)	Lyrics	Duration
"Azhagiya Cinderella"	Hariharan	Kabilan	4:58
"Anarkali"	Karthik, Chitra Sivaraman, Qadir Khan, Murtuza Khan	Pa. Vijay	6:47
"Aaha Thamizamma"	A. R. Reihana, Mathangi Jagdish, Blaaze	Kabilan	5:21
"Theekuruvi"	Johnson, Harini, Mukesh Mohamed	Thenmozhi	4:32
"Ennuyir Thozhiyae"	Unni Menon, Chinmayi Sripaada	Pa. Vijay	5:55

== Release ==
Kangalal Kaidhu Sei was initially scheduled to release on 14 February 2004, during Valentine's Day, but was postponed to 19 February due to Bharathiraja needing more time to reshoot scenes where inconsistencies were identified.

== Critical reception ==
Malini Mannath of Chennai Online wrote that "If a little more of the thought and energy spent on making the frills attractive, had been spent on the structuring of the script, perhaps K K S would have turned out to be an engaging thriller". A critic from Sify wrote that "What happens when veteran directors in search of box-office gold moves away from their traditional mooring to a new genre? It will only spell disaster, as in the case of Bharathiraaja and his new thriller Kangalal Kaithu Sei". Malathi Rangarajan of The Hindu wrote that "Kangalal ... has many Bharatiraaja touches. But does it have the skilled master's magic of the past?" G. Ulaganathan of Deccan Herald wrote, "Bharathiraja uses a different cinematic technique--frequent mix of imagination and reality in several scenes . But inconsistencies in the screenplay mar the speed of the film. Rahman is brilliant, especially with the songs like "Theekuruvi". The camera work by Kannan needs special mention and he captures the beauty of Switzerland imaginatively".
