= Seethakoka Chilaka =

- Theatrical release poster
- Directed by: Bharathirajaa
- Screenplay by: Bharathirajaa
- Dialogue by: Jandhyala
- Story by: Manivannan
- Produced by: Edida Nageswara Rao
- Starring: Murali; Aruna
- Cinematography: B. Kannan
- Edited by: Kotagiri Venkateswara Rao
- Music by: Ilaiyaraaja
- Production company: Poornodaya Movie Creations
- Release date: 21 August 1981
- Country: India
- Language: Telugu

Seethakoka Chilaka (transl. Butterfly) is a 1981 Indian Telugu-language teen romantic drama film directed by Bharathirajaa. The film was produced by Edida Nageswara Rao via Poornodaya Movie Creations banner and was simultaneously shot in Tamil as Alaigal Oivathillai. Karthik (credited as Murali) played the lead role in both versions of the film, alongside Mucherla Aruna in this version, marking the career debut for both actors. The film won five Nandi Awards.

The film was retrospectively featured in the Indian Panorama section of the 9th International Film Festival of India, 1983. It was remade by Bharathiraja in Hindi as Lovers in 1983.

== Plot ==
Raghu, a reckless young man from a remote village, spends his days loitering with his friends and pestering local girls. The village dynamic shifts when a new resident, Karuna, arrives. Raghu and his friends initially try to harass her, but quickly back off upon discovering she is the sister of the feared local figure, David. Meanwhile, Raghu’s mother, a classical music teacher, begins giving singing lessons to Karuna. As Karuna frequents the house for her classes, she and Raghu gradually fall in love.

However, their relationship faces opposition due to religious and social differences. Karuna is a Christian, while Raghu is a Hindu. Additionally, David, Karuna’s brother, is a feared figure in the village and may act violently if he discovers their love. Despite the societal and familial disapproval, Raghu and Karuna continue their relationship. Eventually, they decide to leave the village, choosing to escape the constraints of their community and pursue their love freely.

== Cast ==
- Murali as Raghu
- Aruna as Karuna
- Sarath Babu as David
- Silk Smitha as Lissy
- Jaggayya
- Ramu
- Sriram
- Kishore
- Ramesh
- Dubbing Janaki
- Kalpana Rai
- Sakshi Ranga Rao
- Rallapalli
- Modukuri Satyam
- Babu Rao
- Yechuri
- Bheemaraju
- Jayalatha
- Baby Saraswathi
- Baby Anju
- Master Ali

== Production ==
After Telugu film Edida Nageswara Rao liked the story of director Bharathiraja's Tamil film Alaigal Oivathillai (1981), which had been filming for a few days, he arranged for the film to be made in Telugu as well. Karthik, the lead of Alaigal Oivathillai, was retained in the same role and was credited as Murali. Silk Smitha, who played a major role in Tamil, repeated her role in Telugu. Nageswara Rao persuaded Bharathiraja to give the film a happy ending, and despite having already filmed the originally intended ending, he assented.

== Soundtrack ==
The music was composed by Ilaiyaraaja, with lyrics by Veturi. The songs were chartbusters especially "Maate Manthramu".

Song	Singer
"Alalu Kalalu" (Duet)	Vani Jairam, Ilaiyaraaja
"Alalu Kalalu" (Solo)	Vani Jairam
"Saagara Sangamame" (Duet)	P. Susheela, S. P. Balasubrahmanyam
"Saagara Sangamame" (Solo)	Vani Jairam
"Minneti Sooredu"	Vani Jairam, S. P. Balasubrahmanyam
"Maate Manthramu"	S. P. Balasubrahmanyam, S. P. Sailaja
"Padindi Padindi"	Ramesh

== Release and reception ==
Seethakoka Chilaka was released on 21 August 1981, one month after Alaigal Oivathillai, and ran for 100 days in ten centres. It won the National Film Award for Best Telugu Feature Film, and five Nandi Awards: Best Feature Film – Gold, Best Director (Bharathiraja), Best Supporting Actor (Sarath Babu), Best Music Director (Ilaiyaraaja) and Best Child Actor (Ali).
