= Rupini =

Indian actress

- Born: Komal Mahuvakar; 4 November 1969 (age 56); Mumbai, Maharashtra, India
- Occupations: Actress; Indian classical dancer; doctor
- Years active: 1975–2020
- Partner: Mohan Kumar
- Children: 1

Komal Mahuvakar, better known by her stage name Rupini (born November 4, 1969), is an Indian former actress who has appeared in Hindi, Tamil, Kannada, Malayalam and Telugu language films during the late 1980s and early 1990s.

== Early life ==
Mahuvakar was born in Mumbai into a well educated family. Her father was a lawyer and her mother was a dietitian. She started to learn dancing at the age of four from Lachhu Maharaj in Mumbai and learnt several forms of classical dances including Bharatanatyam, Kuchipudi, Odissi and Kathak.

== Career ==
She was accidentally spotted by the film-maker Hrishikesh Mukherjee who offered her child roles in his films such as Mili (1975), Kotwal Saab (1977) and Khubsoorat (1980) in which she starred under her real name Komal Mahuvakar. She then went on to appear in lead roles in movies like Payal Ki Jhankaar (1980), Ghungroo (1983), Meri Adalat (1984) and Awara Baap (1985). She changed her name to Rupini after taking up South Indian movies like Cooliekkaran (1987), Manithan (1987), En Thangachi Padichava (1988), Apoorva Sagodharargal (1989), Michael Madana Kama Rajan (1990) and Madurai Veeran Enga Saami (1990).

Soon after her marriage to Mohan Kumar in 1995. She quit films and concentrated on her family. She also started the Universal Heart Hospital at Chembur. In 2020, she made her comeback in the Tamil television series Chithi 2.

== Filmography ==
=== Tamil ===
Year	Title	Role	Note
1987	Cooliekkaran	Priya	
1987	Ninaikka Therintha Maname	Vidya	
1987	Theertha Karaiyinile	Poonjolai	
1987	Manithan	Roopa	
1988	En Thangachi Padichava	Valli	
1988	Thaai Paasam	Divya	
1988	Puthiya Vaanam	Devaki	
1989	Enne Petha Raasa	Lakshmi	
1989	Pillaikkaga	Rupini	
1989	Apoorva Sagodharargal	Mano	
1989	Raja Chinna Roja	Rupini	
1990	Pulan Visaranai	Gayathri	
1990	Pattikattan	Mala	
1990	Salem Vishnu	Shanthi	
1990	Ulagam Pirandhadhu Enakkaga	Renu	
1990	Pattanamdhan Pogalamadi	Kalaa	
1990	Madurai Veeran Enga Saami	Sakthi	
1990	Thalattu Padava	Narmadha	
1990	Michael Madana Kama Rajan	Chakkubai	
1991	Naadu Adhai Naadu	Manimegalai	
1991	Annan Kaatiya Vazhi	Seetha	
1991	Vetri Karangal	Priya	
1991	Thanga Thamaraigal	Latha	
1991	Captain Prabhakaran	Gayathri	
1991	Veetla Eli Velila Puli	Lakshmi	
1991	Pudhiya Raagam	Sheela	
1991	Naan Valartha Poove	Seetha	
1991	Pillai Paasam		
1991	Nenjamundu Nermaiyundu	Geetha	
1991	Moondrezhuthil En Moochirukkum	Parvathy Namboodiri	
1992	Kasthuri Manjal	Jyothi	
1992	Ellaichami	Kaveri	
1993	Uzhaippali	Dancer	
1993	Pathini Penn	Kavitha	Tamil Nadu State Film Award Special Prize
1994	Athiradi Padai	Dancer	
1994	Namma Annachi	Ayya's wife	
1994	Thamarai	Sarasu	

=== Malayalam ===
Year	Title	Role	Notes
1989	Naduvazhikal	Rose Mary	
1990	Midhya	Devi	
1992	Kunukkitta Kozhi	Swarnalatha	
1992	Naadody	Meera Nair	
1993	Bandhukkal Sathrukkal	Sakunthala	

=== Hindi ===
Year	Title	Role	Notes
1975	Mili	Child artiste	
1977	Kotwal Saab	Child artiste	
1978	Des Pardes	Child artiste	
1979	Saanch Ko Aanch Nahin	Child artiste	
1980	Khubsoorat	Child artiste	
1980	Payal Ki Jhankaar	Shyama (lead role)	
1983	Ghungroo		
1984	Meri Adalat	Aasha	
1984	Naache Mayuri	Shanthi	
1985	Meraa Ghar Mere Bachche	Keerthy	
1985	Awara Baap		
1986	Chameli Ki Shaadi	Anita	
1986	Chhota Aadmi	Kavitha	
1986	Pyaar Ho Gaya	Sapna Rai	
1986	Nagina	Vijaya Singh	
1986	Shatru		
1987	Woh Din Aayega	Dancer	
1988	Bahaar	Savithri	

=== Kannada ===
Year	Title	Role	Notes
1988	Olavina Aasare	Rajini	
1989	Deva	Gowri	
1990	Mathe Haditu Kogile	Sangeetha	
1991	Neenu Nakkare Haalu Sakkare	Rukmini	
1991	Bhairavi	Selvi	
1992	Rajadhi Raja	Kamalu	
1992	Saptapadi	Sahana	
1992	Ravivarma	Jennifer	
1992	Gopi Krishna	Geetha	
1992	Mallige Hoove	Gowri	

=== Telugu ===
Year	Title	Role	Notes
1989	Ontari Poratam	Indu	
1994	Gandeevam	Rekha	

=== Television ===
Year	Title	Role	Channel	Notes
1989	Vishwamitra		DD National	
2005-2006	Woh Rehne Waali Mehlon Ki	Sheetal Mittal	Sahara One	
2020	Chithi 2	Padma Shanmugapriyan	Sun TV	Comeback after 26 years
