= Thennavan =

Thennavan (lit. 'Southerner') may refer to:

- Thennavan (film), a 2003 Indian Tamil-language film
- Thennavan (actor) (born 1966), Indian actor in Tamil cinema
- M. Thennavan, Indian politician
