= Thayamma =

- Poster
- Directed by: Gopi Bhimsingh
- Written by: Gangai Amaran (dialogues)
- Screenplay by: Gopi Bhimsingh
- Story by: Kaloor Dennis
- Produced by: M. Jagadeeswaran
- Starring: Pandiyan; Anand Babu; Babu; Baby Radhu; Shankar; Goundamani; Senthil; Geetha
- Cinematography: Balu Thevan
- Edited by: B. Lenin; V. T. Vijayan
- Music by: Ilaiyaraaja
- Production company: P.M.S. Cine Arts
- Release date: 27 December 1991
- Running time: 125 minutes
- Country: India
- Language: Tamil

Thayamma (/ˈθɑːjəmmɑː/) is a 1991 Indian Tamil-language buddy comedy film directed by Gopi Bhimsingh, starring Pandiyan, Anand Babu and Babu with Geetha and Shankar. The film also starred Goundamani as well as Senthil. It is a remake of the Malayalam film Thoovalsparsham which was inspired by the 1987 American film Three Men and a Baby, which itself was based on the 1985 French film Three Men and a Cradle. The film, initially scheduled to release on 27 July 1991, was released six months later on 27 December.

== Plot ==
Three young bachelors Pandiyan, Anand and Babu are friends and roommates in an apartment. Rangarajan is their neighbour who is studying for IAS. One day, Pandiyan warns his friends that a parcel will arrive during his absence. The next day, Anand and Babu find a baby before their door. The three bachelors swear that they are not her father. Since then, their lives are completely changed. First, they try to abandon the baby but then they take care of the baby and name her Thayamma. What transpires later forms the crux of the story.

== Cast ==
- Pandiyan as Pandiyan
- Anand Babu as Anand
- Babu as Babu
- Baby Radhu as Thayamma
- Shankar as Rangarajan
- Goundamani as Sisubalan
- Senthil as Azhagappan
- Geetha as Kalyani
- Gowri
- Vennira Aadai Moorthy as Bhoothalingam
- Ra. Sankaran
- Oru Viral Krishna Rao as Anand's uncle
- Typist Gopu
- Vikraman
- M. N. Rajam
- Brinda
- Mani Meenu
- Shruthi
- Premi

== Soundtrack ==
The music was composed by Ilaiyaraaja, with lyrics written by Gangai Amaran. The song "Oru Muthukili Kathum" is set to the raga Keeravani.

Song	Singer(s)	Duration
"Aalai Paartha Saamiyaaru"	Malaysia Vasudevan, Mano	4:14
"Enga Paattukku"	Malaysia Vasudevan, Mano, S. N. Surendar	4:53
"Oru Muthukili Kathum"	Arunmozhi, Mano, S. N. Surendar	4:49
"Pazhaiya Kanavai"	K. S. Chithra	4:51
