= Naadu Adhai Naadu =

- Poster
- Directed by: Ramathilaga Raajen
- Written by: Ramathilaga Raajen
- Produced by: M. Visalakshi; S. Visalakshi
- Starring: Ramarajan; Rupini; Rami Reddy; Chitra
- Cinematography: Rajarajan
- Edited by: G. Jayachandran
- Music by: Deva
- Production company: Mena Movies
- Release date: 14 January 1991
- Country: India
- Language: Tamil

Naadu Adhai Naadu is a 1991 Indian Tamil-language drama film, written and directed by Ramathilaga Raajen. The film stars Ramarajan, Rupini, Rami Reddy and Chitra. It was released on 14 January 1991.

== Plot ==
In the Varikudi slum, Manickam, who ran away from home as an adolescent, returns after 15 years to the joy of his family, especially his cousin Anjalai, a hunter. Manickam learns the slum land is owned by Mirasudhar, a wealthy and caste-obsessed landlord who exploits the low-caste residents working on his farm. The once communal land has become Mirasudhar's property over time. To evade land ceiling limits, he tricked the slum dwellers into signing blank bonds, allowing him to reclaim the land at will. He pays them meagre wages, treating them like slaves. Mirasudhar's daughter, Manimegalai, shares her disdain for lower-caste people, criticising their poverty and large families.

A by-election is announced, with Mirasudhar's friend Vellaisamy running. During a rally in the slum, Manickam confronts Vellaisamy, exposing his ignorance about the constituency, humiliating him in public. Enraged, Vellaisamy reports this to Mirasudhar, who orders Manickam's murder. Manickam overpowers Mirasudhar's henchmen. He and the slum youth demand paddy seeds from Mirasudhar, who owns their land, but he refuses to give them. To humiliate Manickam, Mirasudhar forces his father, Samikkannu, to clean his slippers in public. Though Samikkannu complies, Manickam is enraged. Mirasudhar threatens to burn the slum if Manickam resists. To save a slum resident, Manickam commandeers Manimegalai's car. Anjalai stops her from retaliating, citing their past connection.

Manickam starts a youth club, defying Mirasudhar, who attends its inauguration, bribes the slum dwellers with alcohol, and taunts that his money will divide them. Manickam urges unity, emphasising long-term progress over temporary gains. The slum dwellers, emboldened, confront Mirasudhar for their share of the harvest; he refuses, prompting Manickam to warn of force. The police, called by Mirasudhar, fail to arrest Manickam as the slum dwellers protect him. In revenge, Mirasudhar rapes Anjalai. Manimegalai witnesses this, but hides the truth to safeguard Anjalai, who stops her from committing suicide. Manimegalai develops feelings for Manickam, funding his welfare work in his name. This sparks suspicion among his friends, especially Boopathi, who fears Manickam will marry Manimegalai and seize their lands.

Manickam and the villagers pay the land tax for their lands, held by Mirasudhar, and begin farming with renewed hope. Months later, Mirasudhar plans to steal the harvest, hiring thousands from a dominant caste to reap the crops at night. Manimegalai alerts Manickam, and the villagers thwart the plan, clashing violently with the hired men. Manickam ends the fight, but Boopathi and others, enraged, attempt to burn Mirasudhar's family alive—unbeknownst to Manickam. He rushes to stop them, confessing he doesn't love Manimegalai, but Boopathi distrusts him. A curfew is imposed. Mirasudhar exploits this, telling the villagers that Manickam loves Manimegalai and promises to return their land deeds if they punish Manickam. The villagers agree to tonsure his head and parade him on a donkey. Manickam accepts the humiliation to secure their land.

Samikkannu pleads with Mirasudhar's relatives to spare Manickam, but the villagers remain silent, prioritising their land ownership. Manimegalai tries to stop the punishment, but Mirasudhar orders Boopathi to restrain her, beating her. Enraged, Manickam breaks free and attacks Boopathi's gang. Mirasudhar attempts to shoot Manickam, but Anjalai avenges her rape, killing Mirasudhar. She exposes his crimes, and Manimegalai condemns the villagers' selfishness, tossing the land deeds at them. She leaves with Anjalai and Manickam. The villagers block their exit, begging Manickam to stay. Touched, Manickam agrees to stay in the village with his family.

== Cast ==
- Ramarajan as Manickam
- Rupini as Manimegalai
- Chitra as Anjalai
- Ram Reddy as Mirasudhar
- Goundamani as Chinrasu
- Senthil as Kuthiramuthu
- Samikkannu as Samikkannu
- Sethu Vinayagam as Vellaisamy
- Karikol Raju as a villager
- Usilai Mani as a villager
- Typist Gopu as Chinrasu's father
- Pasumani
- Boopathi as Boopathi
- T. K. S. Natarajan as a priest
- Sivaraman as a villager
- Vellai Subbaiah as Savithri's father
- Karuppu Subbiah as a villager
- Banudhasan
- A. A. Nathan
- Periya Karuppu Thevar as a village singer
- Anuja as Savithri
- Padagar Somanathan as Bhagavathar Somanathan
- Balu Anand as a motorcyclist (uncredited role)

== Soundtrack ==
Music composed by Deva, and lyrics written by Kalidasan.

Track listing
No.	Title	Length
1.	"Adida Thaalam Annaamalai"
2.	"Naattil Ellorum Nalla Irukkanum"
3.	"Oru Kili Tholile"
4.	"Venmegame Odum Venmegame"
