= Perum Pulli =

- Theatrical release poster
- Directed by: Vikraman
- Written by: Vikraman
- Produced by: R. B. Choudary; R. Mohan
- Starring: Babu; Suman Ranganathan
- Cinematography: A. Haribabu
- Edited by: K. Thanikachalam
- Music by: S. A. Rajkumar
- Production company: Super Good Films
- Release date: 14 January 1991
- Country: India
- Language: Tamil

Perum Pulli (transl. Bigshot) is a 1991 Indian Tamil-language film written and directed by Vikraman, starring Babu and Suman Ranganathan. It was released on 14 January 1991, and did not perform well at the box office.

== Plot ==
Perum Pulli is the story of an innocent youth and his love for his mother.

== Cast ==
- Babu
- Suman Ranganathan
- Vinu Chakravarthy
- Srividya
- Jiiva (uncredited role)

== Soundtrack ==
Soundtrack was composed by S. A. Rajkumar. Palani Bharathi was introduced as lyricist in this film.

Song	Singers	Lyrics
"Aagaya Thottil Katti" (Lady)	P. Susheela	Vikraman
"Aagaya Thottil Katti" (Men)	S. A. Rajkumar	Vikraman
"Aanum Pennum"	Malaysia Vasudevan, P. Susheela	Piraisoodan
"Gangai Nadhi"	K. S. Chithra	Pulamaipithan
"Ilamaiyin Vizhigalil"	K. S. Chithra	Palani Bharathi
"Mambala Thota"	Malaysia Vasudevan, Sunandha	Piraisoodan
"Manasum Manasum"	Sunandha, S. P. Balasubrahmanyam	S. A. Rajkumar
"Ponmagal Vandhal"	K. J. Yesudas	Alangudi Somu
"Varuthu Varuthu"	Mano	Na. Kamarasan

== Reception ==
N. Krishnaswamy of The Indian Express wrote, "Perum Pulli has a hash of a story", adding that Babu "plays the lead role with some skill, but the character does not have much chance in a hotchpotch narrative".
