= Annan Kaatiya Vazhi =

- Directed by: K. S. Madhavan
- Starring: Ramarajan; Rupini
- Music by: S. A. Rajkumar
- Production company: Prithvi Productions
- Distributed by: East Coast Films
- Release date: 15 March 1991
- Country: India
- Language: Tamil

Annan Kaatiya Vazhi (transl. The path shown by the elder brother) is a 1991 Indian Tamil-language drama film directed by K. S. Madhangan. The film stars Ramarajan and Rupini, with Delhi Ganesh, Senthil, and V. K. Ramasamy. It was released on 15 March 1991, and failed at the box office.

== Plot ==
The film stars Anand (Ramarajan) who becomes an estate manager in order to repay the debts of his elder brother (Delhi Ganesh) and support his family. However things go south when Anand faces challenges from thugs. He finds assistance from Kalpana, a martial artist who later becomes his teacher. But Kalpana soon develops a love interest in Anand.

He rejects Kalpana because he always saw her as a guru/teacher. Meanwhile, Kalpana pinned hopes on him that he will marry her one-day.

Anand later encounters Raadha a woman who goes to Achiramam as a sex worker. Anand tries to change her into a good person. Raadha develops interest in him and her grandma has discussions with Anand's elder brother. Anand generally obeys his elder brother and is shocked, because Anand is in love with Seetha (Rupini) and has promised that he will marry only her. The elder brother is not convinced but allows Anand to decide.

A group of men abduct Raadha. Anand rescues her. Meanwhile Raadha's grandma somehow convinces Seetha's parents to send Seetha out of the village so that Raadha can marry Anand. Seetha is accompanied by Raadha's grandma to a railway station in the climax. Anand searches for her there. Raadha later realises the love between Anand and Seetha and decides to sacrifice her life for them by convincing her grandmother by saying "Paati enoda kaadhal ah vilaiku vangunathu podhum. Deivathuke vakkapata ponu avanga sera vendiya idam inga. Avanga Kaadhal unmaiyanathu."

== Cast ==
- Ramarajan as Anand, estate manager
- Rupini as Seetha, Ramarajan's love interest
- Delhi Ganesh as Anand's elder brother
- Senthil
- V. K. Ramasamy as Seetha's father

== Soundtrack ==
Music was composed by S. A. Rajkumar.

Track listing
No.	Title	Singer(s)	Length
1.	"Naan Appanilla"	Malaysia Vasudevan, Uma Ramanan
2.	"Vaa Uyire"	Mano, K. S. Chithra
3.	"Chinnayya"	Mano, K. S. Chithra
4.	"Uyare Oyya"	S. A. Rajkumar, K. S. Chithra
5.	"Panimalayai"	S. P. Balasubrahmanyam, Mano
