= Manasara Vazhthungalen =

- Theatrical release poster
- Directed by: Partheparaman
- Written by: Partheparaman
- Produced by: T. Sivanathan; R. Dhanasekhar
- Starring: Ramkumar; Sivaranjani
- Cinematography: B. R. Vijayalakshmi
- Edited by: M. N. Raja
- Music by: S. A. Rajkumar
- Production company: Gajanithi Films
- Release date: 12 September 1991
- Country: India
- Language: Tamil

Manasara Vazhthungalen (transl. Bless us wholeheartedly) is a 1991 Indian Tamil-language romantic drama film written and directed by Partheparaman. The film stars Ramkumar and Sivaranjani, in her film debut. It was released on 12 September 1991, and failed at the box-office.

== Plot ==
Two young lovers elope from their homes after their respective parents object to their romance.

== Cast ==
- Ramkumar
- Sivaranjani
- Janagaraj
- Vijayan
- Kamala Kamesh
- C. R. Saraswathi
- Kumarimuthu
- Pasi Narayanan
- Karuppu Subbiah
- Thayir Vadai Desikan
- Periya Karuppu Thevar
- Omakuchi Narasimhan

== Production ==
Manasara Vazhthungalen is the film debut of Sivaranjani. Babu was originally cast as the lead actor. Following a stunt sequence gone wrong, he suffered spinal injuries and became permanently paralysed. By then, more than 50% of the film had been shot, and the scenes involving Babu were reshot with Ramkumar, leading to cost overruns.

== Soundtrack ==
The music was composed by S. A. Rajkumar.

Track listing
No.	Title	Lyrics	Singer(s)	Length
1.	"Nee Sonnadhe"	Piraisoodan	Mano, Uma Ramanan
2.	"Raasi Nalla Raasi"	Na. Kamarasan	Mano, K. S. Chithra, Kovai Kamala
3.	"Poongatre Nee Enge"	Muthulingam	S. P. Balasubrahmanyam
4.	"Ooraalum Sakthi"	S. A. Rajkumar	Malaysia Vasudevan, Sunandha
5.	"Jal Jal"	Muthulingam	S. A. Rajkumar

== Release and reception ==
Manasara Vazhthungalen was released on 12 September 1991. N. Krishnaswamy of The Indian Express wrote, "The film moves in fits and starts and quite haphazardly. Things happen all of a sudden, without prior warning or development". The film failed at the box-office as the collections were not enough to cover the increased production costs.
