= Bharathiraja =

Indian film director and actor (1942–2026)

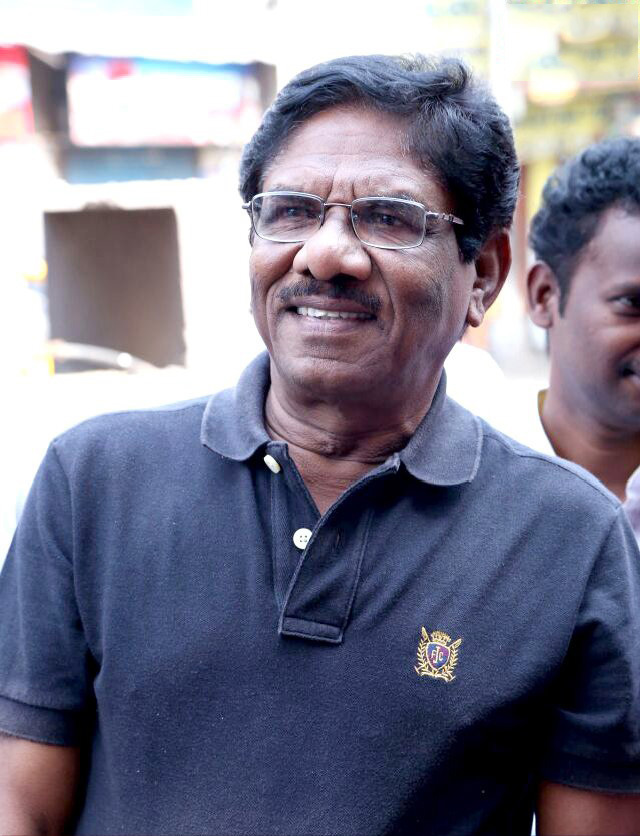
- Bharathiraja in 2014
- Born: Chinnasaamy Periyamaya Thevar; 17 July 1941; Allinagaram, Madura District, Madras Province, British India (now in Theni District, Tamil Nadu, India)
- Died: 10 June 2026 (aged 84); Chennai, Tamil Nadu, India
- Occupations: Film director; producer; screenwriter; actor
- Years active: 1977–2026
- Spouse: Chandraleela (m. 1974)
- Children: 2, including Manoj Bharathiraja
- Relatives: Manoj Kumar (Son); Nandana (daughter-in-law)
- Awards: Padma Shri (2004)

Chinnasaamy Periyamaya Thevar (17 July 1941 – 10 June 2026), better known by his stage name Bharathiraja, (/ˈbɑːrəθirɑːdʒɑː/) was an Indian film director, producer, screenwriter and actor who worked mainly in the Tamil film industry. Making his debut in 1977 with 16 Vayathinile, he was known for realistic and sensitive portrayals of rural life in his films and popularly referred to as Iyakkunar Imayam (transl. The Pinnacle of Directors). Bharathiraja had won six National Film Awards, four Filmfare Awards South, six Tamil Nadu State Film Awards and a Nandi Award. He also directed films in Telugu and Hindi. The Government of India honoured him with the Padma Shri award, India's fourth-highest civilian honour, in 2004 for his contribution to the film industry. In 2005, he was conferred with the Doctor of Letters (honorary degree) from Sathyabama University.

== Biography ==
=== Early life ===
Bharathiraja was born as Chinnasaamy Periyamaya Thevar in Theni Allinagaram, a town in the Theni district of Tamil Nadu, on 17 July 1941, to parents K. Periyamaya Thevar and Karuthammal in a Kallar (Thevar) family. He made the name "Bharathiraja" as a portmanteau of his sister's name Bharathi and brother's name Jayaraj.

=== Film career ===
Bharathiraja started his film career as an assistant to Kannada filmmaker Puttanna Kanagal. Later, he assisted P. Pullaiah, M. Krishnan Nair, Avinasi Mani and A. Jagannathan. His first film 16 Vayathinile, for which he wrote the script, broke the then existing convention to create a new genre of village cinema. The film is now regarded as a milestone in the history of Tamil Cinema. About the film, Bharathiraja said: "This movie was meant to be a black & white art film produced with the help of National Film Development Corporation", but turned out to be a commercially successful colour film and a starting point for several important careers. His next film Kizhake Pogum Rail produced similar results and eventually brought in criticisms that Bharathiraja was capable of catering only to rural audiences. This led him to make Sigappu Rojakkal, an urban psychological thriller.

Bharathiraja confirmed his versatility and refusal to be tied down to one particular genre with an experimental film Nizhalgal (1980), and the action thriller Tik Tik Tik (1981). But undoubtedly, rural themes proved to be his strong suit as his biggest hits in the 1980s: Alaigal Oivathillai (1981), Mann Vasanai (1983) and Muthal Mariyathai (1985) were strong love stories in a village backdrop.

Vedham Pudhithu dealt with the caste issue in a stronger manner. The film's narrative was seamless and starred Sathyaraj as Balu Thevar. It contains some of Bharathiraja's trademark touches as well as several ground-breaking scenes. Vedham Pudhithu made a revolutionary thoughts about caste discriminations in Brahmin and other upper castes in Tamil Nadu. Bharathiraja has successfully managed to modernise his film-making techniques for the 1990s. The commercial success of Kizhakku Cheemaiyile and the awards that Karuththamma garnered stand as testimony to his ability to thrill the younger generation as well. Bharathiraja was on the same stage in 1996 to receive another National Award for Anthimanthaarai.

In late 1996, Bharathiraja was signed on to direct two films, with the Sarathkumar-starrer Vaakkapatta Bhoomi announced in October. The following month, he began work on a film titled Siragugal Murivadhillai, starring Napolean, Heera Rajagopal and Prakash Raj. Both films were later shelved. He planned to revive Vaakkapatta Bhoomi with Cheran during late 2004, but the collaboration did not materialise.

His 2001 film Kadal Pookal won him that year's National Film Award for Best Screenplay. The well-known Tamil film director Bhagyaraj was one of his assistant directors. In 2008, Bharathiraja made his television debut with series Thekkathi Ponnu which aired on Kalaignar TV. He went on to direct two other series Appanum Aathaalum and Muthal Mariyathai for the same channel.

During early 2016, Bharathiraja was embroiled in a legal tussle with director Bala on making a film titled Kutra Parambarai, though neither filmmaker eventually made their respective films. He later moved on to plan a film starring director Vasanth's son, Ritwik Varun, and Vikram's nephew, but the film was dropped after two schedules. In 2018, Bharathiraja was working on a film titled 8 November, Iravu 8 Mani starring Vidharth, which narrates events following the decision to demonetise certain banknotes in India.

=== Illness and death ===
On 27 December 2025, Bharathiraja fell ill and was admitted to a private hospital in Chennai within a week. Hospital authorities confirmed that his condition was stable and many people from the film fraternity paid him a visit. He died of complications on 10 June 2026, at the age of 84 and was buried with full state honors. He was predeceased by his son, Manoj Bharathiraja, who had died in March 2025.

== Personal life ==
Bharathiraja married Chandraleela in 1974 and had two children Manoj Bharathiraja (1976–2025) and Janani (born 1979).

Manoj was an actor who was introduced in the 1999 Bharathiraja-directed Taj Mahal. Manoj married actress Nandana. He died of a heart attack on 25 March 2025. Janani is married to Rajkumar Thambiraja in Malaysia.

Bharathiraja's brother-in-law Manoj Kumar has directed films such as Mannukkul Vairam, Vandicholai Chinraasu, Vaanavil and Guru Paarvai. His brother Jayaraj made his acting debut with Kaththukkutti. His relative Stalin Muthu is a television actor who acted in serials such as Saravanan Meenatchi and 7C.

== Style, critique and public perception ==
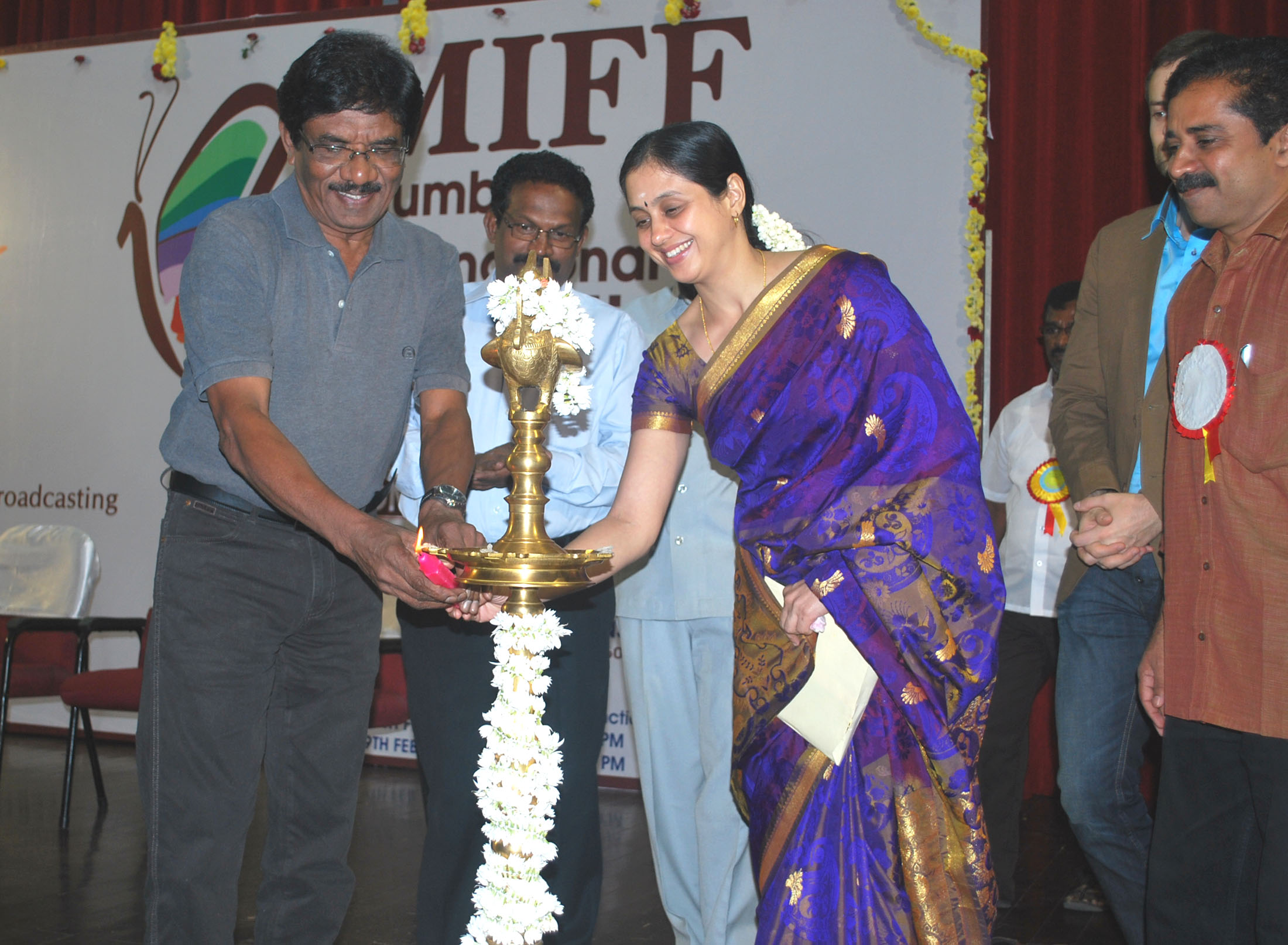
Bharathiraja (left) and Devayani (right) lighting the lamp to inaugurate the 13th Mumbai International Film Festival, in Chennai.

When the old era was dominated by films shot inside studios, Bharathiraja directed village themed films that inspired Tamil cinema to capture live locations. Array of village films in Tamil cinema started after his trendsetting film 16 Vayathinile. He changed the attire of male lead role as simple and without much cosmetics and female leads in his films as dusky looking which were before dominated by fair skinned ladies. He started the style of directors speaking to the audience with his famous dialogue "En Iniya Thamizh Makkale (My sweet Tamil people)". Bharathiraja is revered as one of the best directors of Indian cinema. His ideas were original and his subjects were complex ideas expressed in a manner every common man could understand.

Bharathiraja was also known for introducing a number of new faces to the film industry. He has introduced many actors as new faces notable among them are Karthik, Radha, Revathi, Radhika, and Vijayashanti. Apart from lead actors, he has introduced a bunch of supporting actors. Notable among them include Janagaraj, Vadivukkarasi, Chandrasekhar, Pandiyan, and Napoleon. As an experimental initiative he used to give new actors a small role in his films later they becoming popular among people and turning to busy actors. Many present day directors who were unknown to people turned into actors after playing a debut petty role in his films: K. Bhagyaraj, Manivannan, Manobala, Thiagarajan, and Ponvannan are among them. He was also instrumental in portraying Sathyaraj for the first time in lead role.

He inspired many young film makers and ran a school called Bharathi Raja International Institute of Cinema (BRIIC) on film making.

Bharathiraja directed socially themed films with special emphasis on women and their complicated interpersonal relationships. He addressed other social evils like caste discrimination in his films.

== Awards ==
=== Civilian honours ===
- 2004 – Padma Shri from the Government of India

=== National Film Awards ===
- 1982 – National Film Award for Best Feature Film in Telugu for Seethakoka Chilaka (Director)
- 1986 – National Film Award for Best Feature Film in Tamil for Mudhal Mariyathai (Producer & Director)
- 1988 – National Film Award for Best Film on Other Social Issues Vedham Pudhithu (Director)
- 1995 – National Film Award for Best Film on Family Welfare for Karuththamma (Director)
- 1996 – National Film Award for Best Feature Film in Tamil for Anthimanthaarai (Director)
- 2001 – National Film Award for Best Screenplay for Kadal Pookkal (Director & Writer)

=== Filmfare Awards South ===
- 1978 – Best Tamil Director for Sigappu Rojakkal
- 1987 – Best Tamil Film for Vedham Pudhithu
- 1987 – Best Tamil Director for Vedham Pudhithu
- 1994 – Best Tamil Film for Karuthamma

=== Tamil Nadu State Film Awards ===
- 1977 – Best Director Award for 16 Vayathinile
- 1979 – Tamil Nadu State Film Award for Best Film – Second Prize – Puthiya Vaarpugal
- 1981 – Best Director Award for Alaigal Oivathillai
- 1994 – Best Film Portraying Woman in Good Light for Karuththamma
- 2001 – Tamil Nadu State Film Honorary Award – Arignar Anna Award in 2001
- 2003 – Best Film in First place Eera Nilam

=== Nandi Awards ===
- 1981 – Nandi Award for Best Director for Seethakoka Chiluka

=== Vijay Awards ===
- 2012 – Contribution to Tamil Cinema
- 2013 – Best Supporting Actor for Pandiya Naadu

=== Other awards ===
- 1980 – South Indian Film Technicians : Best Technician Award for Kallukkul Eeram
- 2005 – Honorary doctorate (D.Litt) from Sathyabama University
- 2015 – SIIMA Lifetime Achievement Award

== Controversies ==
- He attended the Maaveerar Naal (Heroes Day) Conference, which was a day to remember the deaths of militants who fought with the Liberation Tigers of Tamil Eelam (LTTE), which had been banned in India as a terrorist group since 1992, in the wake of former Indian Prime Minister Rajiv Gandhi's assassination a year prior, in Jaffna, Sri Lanka and appreciated its bravery and valour.
- He organised a protest by Nadigar Sangam against the Indian state of Karnataka for not releasing Cauvery water at Neyveli. During an interview to Sun TV channel, film co-stars such as Sarath Kumar and wife Radhika who attended the conference accused him of using that opportunity to eulogise current Tamil Nadu Chief Minister Jayalalitha and launching attacks on actor Rajinikanth's home state's ethnicity.

== Filmography ==
=== As director, producer and screenwriter ===
==== Films ====
- Note: he is credited in many films as Bharathirajaa.

Year	Title	Credited as			Language	Notes
Year	Title	Director	Writer	Producer	Language	Notes
1977	16 Vayathinile	✓	✓	✗	Tamil	Tamil Nadu State Film Award for Best Director
1978	Kizhakke Pogum Rail	✓	Screenplay	✗	Tamil	
1978	Sigappu Rojakkal	✓	✓	✗	Tamil	Filmfare Award for Best Tamil Director
1979	Solva Sawan	✓	✓	✗	Hindi	Remake of 16 Vayathinile
1979	Puthiya Vaarpugal	✓	Screenplay	✓	Tamil	
1979	Niram Maaratha Pookkal	✓	Screenplay	✗	Tamil	Voice for Vijayan
1980	Kotha Jeevithalu	✓	Screenplay	✗	Telugu	Remake of Puthiya Vaarpugal
1980	Red Rose	✓	✓	✗	Hindi	Remake of Sigappu Rojakkal
1980	Nizhalgal	✓	Screenplay	✗	Tamil	
1981	Alaigal Oivathillai	✓	Screenplay	✗	Tamil	Tamil Nadu State Film Award for Best Director
1981	Seethakoka Chiluka	✓	Screenplay	✗	Telugu	National Film Award for Best Feature Film in Telugu
1981	Tik Tik Tik	✓	✓	✗	Tamil	
1982	Kaadhal Oviyam	✓	Screenplay	✗	Tamil	
1982	Valibamey Vaa Vaa	✓	Screenplay	✗	Tamil	
1983	Mann Vasanai	✓	Screenplay	✗	Tamil	
1983	Lovers	✓	Screenplay	✗	Hindi	Remake of Alaigal Oivathillai / Seethakoka Chiluka
1984	Pudhumai Penn	✓	Screenplay	✗	Tamil	
1985	Oru Kaidhiyin Diary	✓	Screenplay	✓	Tamil	
1985	Mudhal Mariyathai	✓	Screenplay	✓	Tamil	National Film Award for Best Feature Film in Tamil
1986	Saveray Wali Gaadi	✓	Screenplay	✗	Hindi	
1986	Kadalora Kavithaigal	✓	Screenplay	✗	Tamil	25th film
1987	Vedham Pudhithu	✓	Screenplay	✗	Tamil	National Film Award for Best Film on Other Social Issues
1987	Aradhana	✓	Screenplay	✗	Telugu	
1988	Jamadagni	✓	✓	✗	Telugu	Dubbed in Tamil as Naarkaali Kanavugal
1988	Kodi Parakuthu	✓	Screenplay	✓	Tamil	Voice for Manivannan
1990	En Uyir Thozhan	✓	Screenplay	✗	Tamil	
1991	Pudhu Nellu Pudhu Naathu	✓	Screenplay	✗	Tamil	
1992	Nadodi Thendral	✓	Screenplay	✓	Tamil	
1993	Captain Magal	✓	Screenplay	✓	Tamil	
1993	Kizhakku Cheemayile	✓	Screenplay	✗	Tamil	
1994	Karuthamma	✓	Screenplay	✗	Tamil	National Film Award for Best Film on Family Welfare
1995	Pasumpon	✓	Screenplay	✗	Tamil	
1996	Tamizh Selvan	✓	Screenplay	✗	Tamil	
1996	Anthimanthaarai	✓	Screenplay	✓	Tamil	National Film Award for Best Feature Film in Tamil
1999	Taj Mahal	✓	Screenplay	✗	Tamil	
2001	Kadal Pookkal	✓	Screenplay	✗	Tamil	National Film Award for Best Screenplay
2003	Eera Nilam	✓	Screenplay	✓	Tamil	
2004	Kangalal Kaidhu Sei	✓	Screenplay	✗	Tamil	
2008	Bommalattam	✓	✓	✗	Tamil	
2013	Annakodi	✓	✓	✓	Tamil	
2016	Final Cut of Director	✓	✓	✗	Hindi	
2020	Meendum Oru Mariyathai	✓	✓	✓	Tamil	

==== Television ====
List of TV Serials directed by Bharathiraja and aired on Kalaignar TV.

- Thekkathi Ponnu
- Appanum Aathalum
- Muthal Mariyathai
- Modern Love Chennai – Web series Episode 5: Paravai Kootil Vaazhum Maangal

=== As actor ===
Year	Title	Role	Notes
1978	Kizhakke Pogum Rail	Station master	Uncredited role
1980	Kallukkul Eeram	Himself	Also writer
1984	Dhavani Kanavugal	Himself	Guest appearance
1991	Idhayam	Himself	Guest appearance
1991	Thanthu Vitten Ennai	Himself	Guest appearance
1999	Poovellam Kettuppar	Himself	Guest appearance
2002	Kadhal Virus	Himself	Guest appearance
2004	Aayutha Ezhuthu	Selvanayagam	
2010	Rettaisuzhi	Singaravelan	
2013	Pandianadu	Kalyanasundaram	Vijay Award for Best Supporting Actor
2014	Ninaithathu Yaaro	Himself	Guest appearance
2017	Kurangu Bommai	Sundaram	
2017	Padaiveeran	Krishnan	
2018	Seethakaathi	Himself	Special appearance
2019	Kennedy Club	Savarimuthu	
2019	Namma Veetu Pillai	Arunmozhivarman	
2020	Meendum Oru Mariyathai	Om	
2021	Eeswaran	Periyasamy	
2021	Rocky	Manimaran	
2022	Kuttram Kuttrame	DSP Muthukaruppan	
2022	Thiruchitrambalam	Thiruchitrambalam Sr.	
2023	Vaathi	Villager	Cameo appearance
2023	Sir	Villager	Telugu film; Cameo appearance
2023	Thiruvin Kural	Marimuthu	
2023	Karumegangal Kalaigindrana	Ramanathan	
2023	Margazhi Thingal	Ramaiyaa	
2024	Kalvan	Azhagar	
2024	Maharaja	Gopal Thatha	
2024	Thiru.Manickam		
2025	Niram Marum Ulagil	Rayappan	
2025	Thudarum	Stunt Master Palani Swamy	Malayalam film
2025	Desiya Thalaivar		
2026	Pulavar	Meiyandavar / Pulavar	posthumous release

=== Dubbing artist ===
- Vijayan (Niram Maaratha Pookkal, Mann Vasanai)
- Thiagarajan (Alaigal Oivathillai)
- Nizhalgal Ravi (Vedham Pudhithu)
- Manivannan (Kodi Parakuthu)
- Thennavan (En Uyir Thozhan)

=== Singer ===
- "Kaadu Pottakaadu" (Karuthamma)
