= Theni Allinagaram =

Theni Allinagaram Theni
- Town
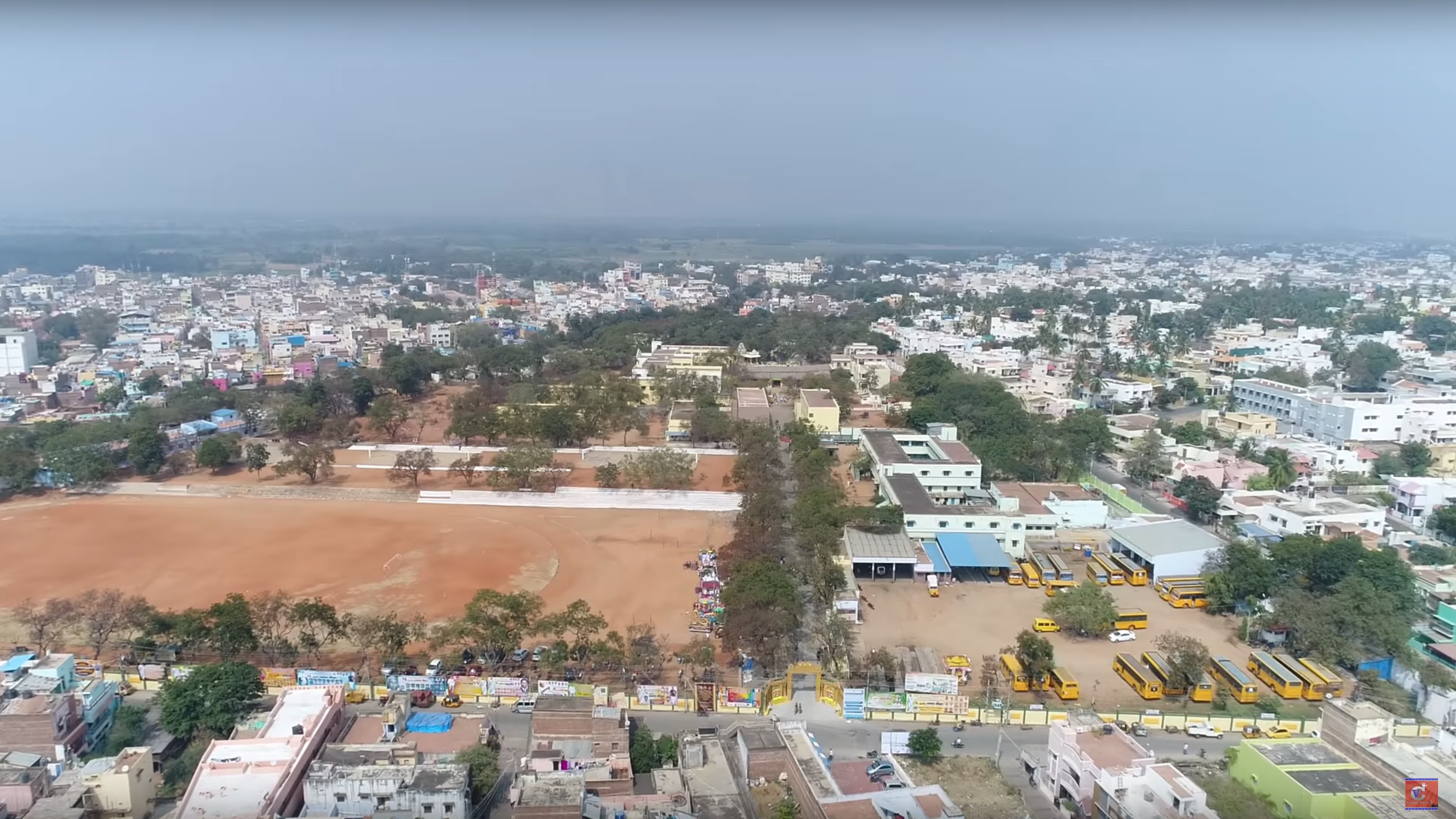
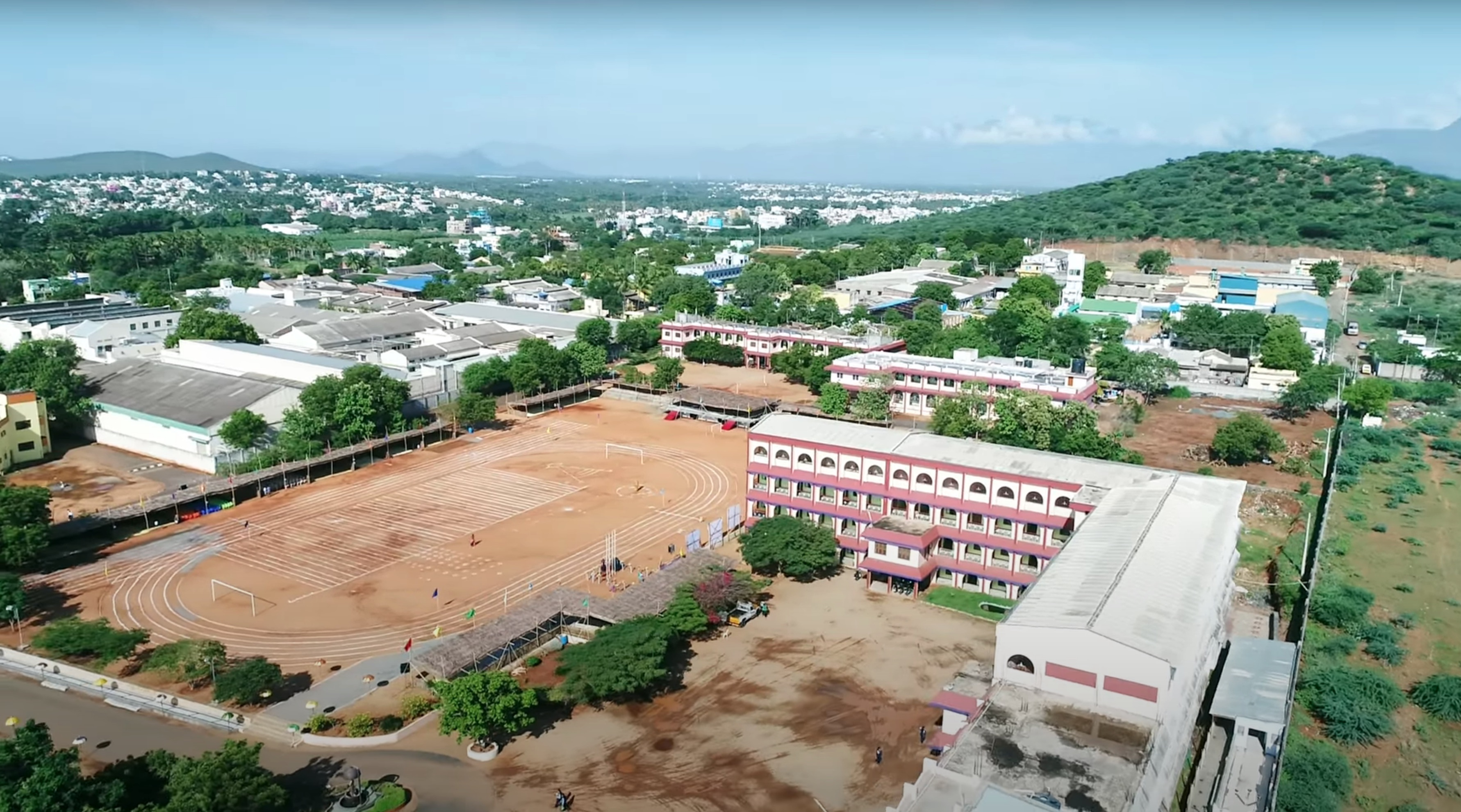
- From top: Theni view from forest road, Theni view from mary matha school
- Nicknames: The earth's hidden paradise, Gateway to tourism
- Location in Tamil Nadu, India
- Coordinates: 10°00′43″N 77°28′43″E
- Country: India
- State: Tamil Nadu
- District: Theni

Government
  - Type: Municipality
  - Body: Theni Municipality
  - Chairman: M Amrit
  - Commissioner: S Nagarajan
- Elevation: 300 m (980 ft)

Population (2011)
  - Town: 94,453
  - Metro: 202,100
- Demonym: Thenikaran

Languages
  - Official: Tamil
- Time zone: UTC+5:30 (IST)
- PIN: 625531
- Telephone code: 04546
- Vehicle registration: TN 60, TN 60Z
- Distance from State Capital Chennai: 498 kilometres (309 mi) southwest
- Climate: Average and moderate cool at winter (Köppen)
- Precipitation: 658 millimetres (25.9 in)
- Avg. summer temperature: 39.5 °C (103.1 °F)
- Avg. winter temperature: 25.8 °C (78.4 °F)
- Website: www.theni.tn.nic.in

Theni Allinagaram is a valley town situated in the Indian state of Tamil Nadu at the foothills of Western Ghats. It is the headquarters of the Theni district, 70 km from Madurai. As of 2011, the town had a population of 94,453. The metro area had a population of 202,100.

== Demographics ==
Religious census
Religion	Percent(%)
Hindu	95.04%
Muslim	3.18%
Christian	1.63%
Sikh	0.02%
Buddhist	0.01%
Other	0.12%
No religion	0.01%

According to 2011 census, Theni Allinagaram had a population of 94,453 with a sex-ratio of 999 females for every 1,000 males, much above the national average of 929. A total of 9,138 were under the age of six, constituting 4,738 males and 4,400 females. Scheduled Castes and Scheduled Tribes accounted for 16.44% and 0.03% of the population respectively. The average literacy of the town was 77.55%, compared to the national average of 72.99%. The town had a total of 25371 households. There were a total of 37,654 workers, comprising 520 cultivators, 2,798 main agricultural labourers, 694 in house hold industries, 30,450 other workers, 3,192 marginal workers, 56 marginal cultivators, 643 marginal agricultural labourers, 116 marginal workers in household industries and 2,377 other marginal workers. The metro area includes nearby towns and suburban areas such as Palanichettipatti, Puthipuram, Aranmanaiputhur, Mullainagarm, Vadaputhupatti etc. The metro area had a population of 202,100 as of 2011.

As per the religious census of 2011, Theni Allinagaram had 95.04% Hindus, 3.18% Muslims, 1.63% Christians, 0.02% Sikhs, 0.01% Buddhists, 0.12% following other religions and 0.01% following no religion or did not indicate any religious preference.

== Administration ==
Theni houses the office of the (revenue) District Collector. Periyakulam has the district court, which was built and operated in the British period.

== See also ==
- India-based Neutrino Observatory
