= Theni =

- Neighbourhood
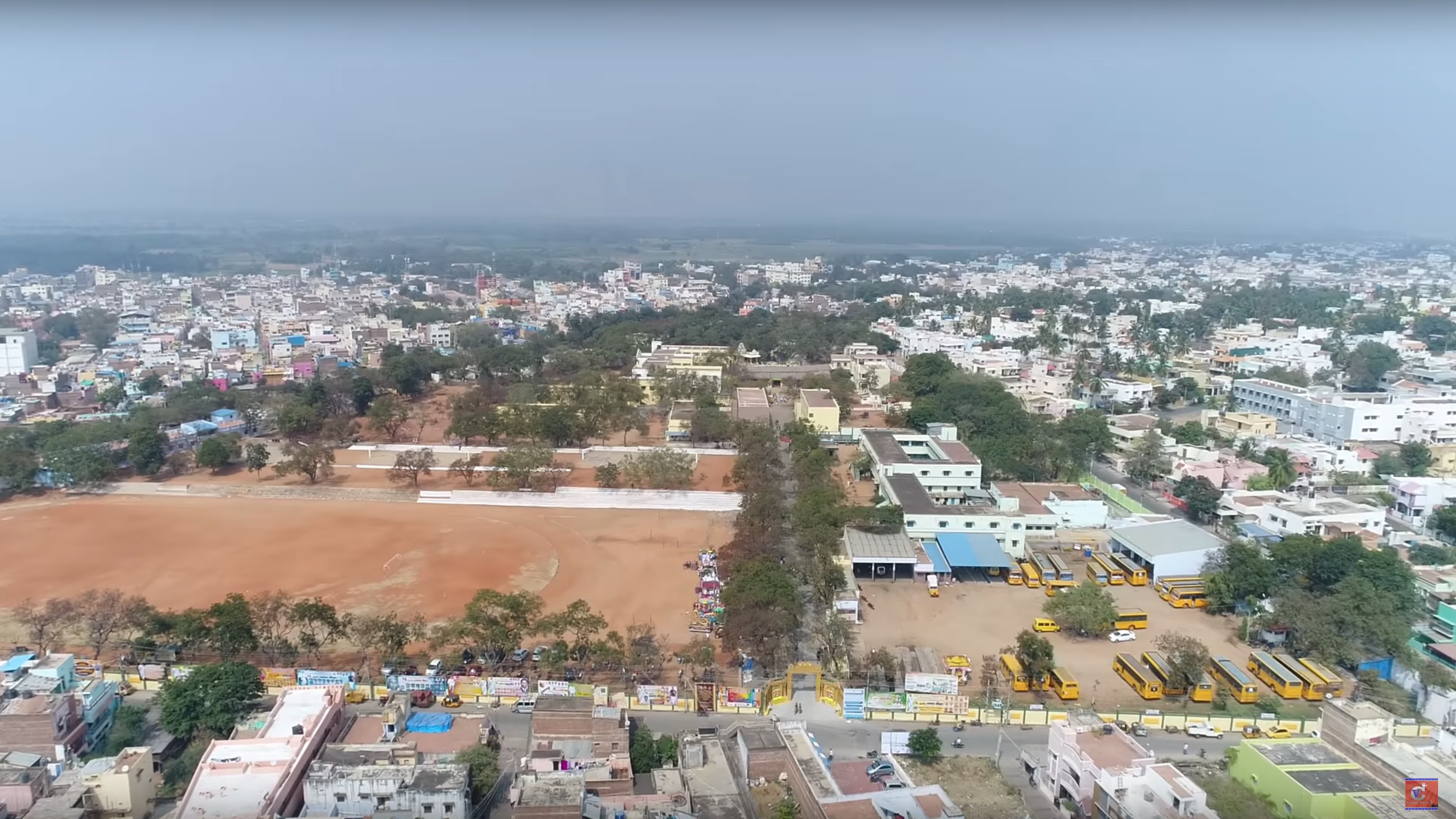
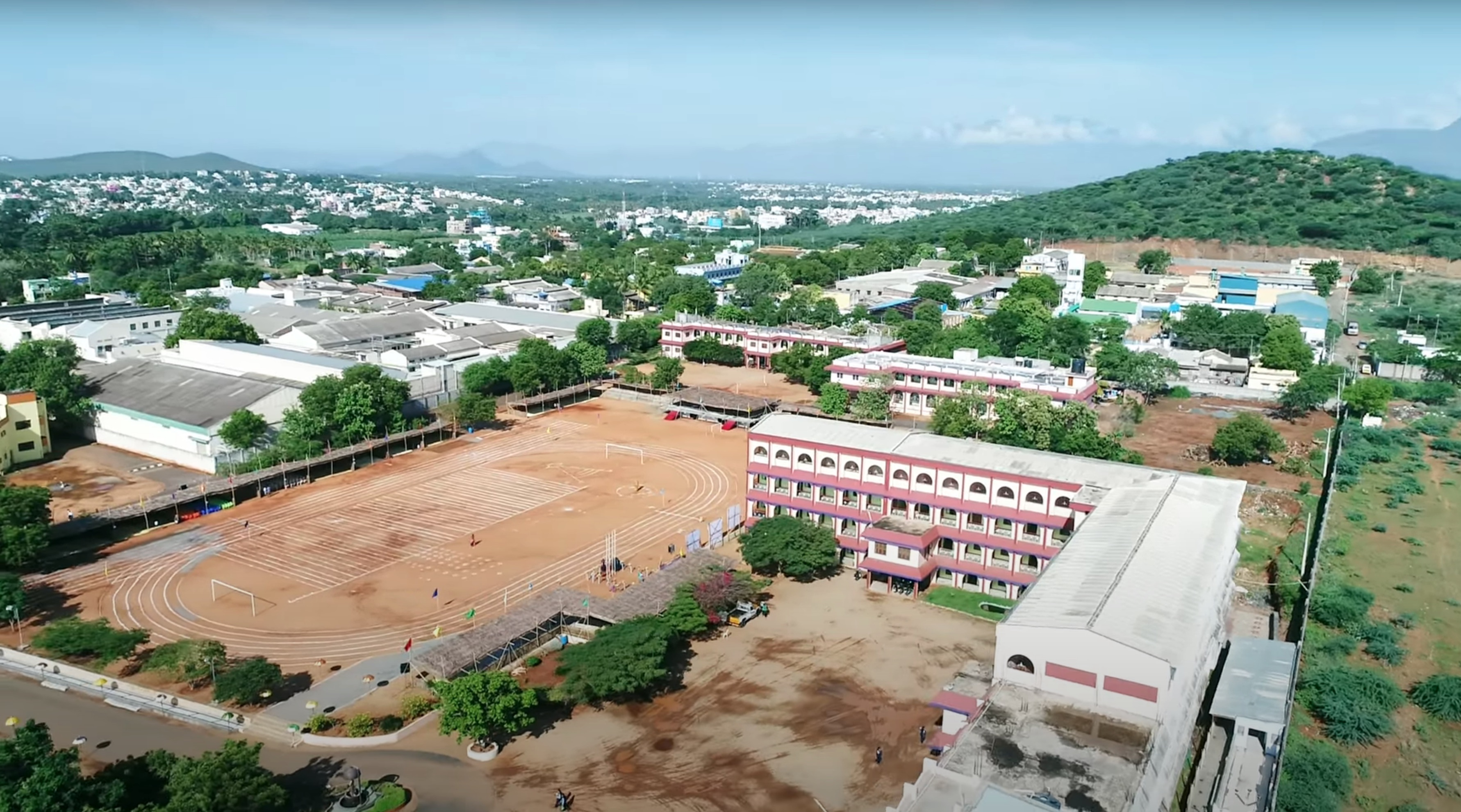
- From top: Theni view from the forest road, Theni view from mary matha school
- Nickname: Gateway to highland
- Theni, Tamil Nadu, India
- Coordinates: 10°1′13.356″N 77°28′47.05″E
- Country: India
- State: Tamil Nadu
- District: Theni

Government
  - Type: Municipality
  - Body: Theni Allinagaram Municipality
  - Chairman: S Murugesan
  - Commissioner: S Nagarajan
- Elevation: 339 m (1,112 ft)

Population (2011)
  - Total: 202,100

Languages
  - Tamil, Telugu, Malayalam, English, Kannada: Tamil
- Time zone: UTC+5:30 (IST)
- PIN: 625531
- Telephone code: 04546
- Vehicle registration: TN 60, TN 60Z
- Distance from State Capital Chennai: 498 kilometres (309 mi) southwest
- Climate: Average and moderate cool at winter (Köppen)
- Precipitation: 658 millimetres (25.9 in)
- Avg. summer temperature: 39.5 °C (103.1 °F)
- Avg. winter temperature: 25.8 °C (78.4 °F)
- Website: www.theni.tn.nic.in

Theni is a valley town situated in the Indian state of Tamil Nadu at the foothills of the Western Ghats. It is the headquarters of the Theni district, 70 km from Madurai.

== See also ==
- Theni Allinagaram
- India-based Neutrino Observatory
