= Thennavan (actor) =

Indian Tamil actor (born 1966)

- Born: Ramesh Duraisamy; 16 November 1966 (age 59); Coimbatore, Tamil Nadu
- Other name: Kai Thennavan
- Occupation: actor
- Years active: 1990 - Present

Thennavan is an Indian actor who has appeared in supporting roles. After making his debut in Bharathiraja's En Uyir Thozhan (1990), the actor was recognised for his role as 'Kai (means Hand)' in Gemini (2002) Virumaandi (2004) and Jay Jay (2003).

== Career ==
Thennavan made his acting debut in Bharathiraja's 1990 film En Uyir Thozhan, portraying a secondary lead role. He won critical acclaim for his performance as Kai in Saran's Gemini (2002), and has since been credited in films as Kai Thennavan. Playing a sidekick to Vikram's titular character, The Hindu gave him a positive review writing "he does a convincing job" and "his penetrating stare takes care of the expressions." The success of the film, saw Kamal Haasan pick him to play a role in Virumaandi, for which he also received positive reviews.

Thennavan then played the lead role in an experimental film, Ayul Regai (2005), winning critical acclaim for his portrayal of a man on the verge of depression. He has since been seen in supporting roles in films including Sundarapandian (2012) and Naan Than Bala (2014).

== Filmography ==
Year	Film	Role	Notes
1990	En Uyir Thozhan	Ramesh	
1992	Mudhal Kural		
1995	Veluchami		
2002	Gemini	Kai	
2003	Jay Jay	Karuppatti	
2003	Kalatpadai	Priya's uncle	
2003	Diwan		
2004	Aethirree	Inspector Dhanapathi	
2004	Jore		
2004	Virumaandi	Kondarasu	
2004	7G Rainbow Colony	Mortuary Worker	
2005	Ayul Regai	Karikalan	
2005	Sandakozhi	Durai's brother-in-law	
2006	Pudhupettai	Selvam	
2006	Aacharya	Koorumathi	
2006	Thalaimagan		
2007	Ammuvagiya Naan	Mohan	
2007	Koodal Nagar		
2007	Manikanda		
2008	Kathi Kappal	Thennavan	
2009	Vaigai	Duraisingam	
2009	Gnabagangal		
2011	Ilaignan		
2011	Vaagai Sooda Vaa	Dhamo	
2011	Sadhurangam	Singaperumal's henchman	
2012	Krishnaveni Panjaalai		
2012	Sundarapandian	Pandi Thevar	
2014	Naan Than Bala	Kattooran	
2014	Jigarthanda	Sekhar	
2015	Vethu Vettu	Mahalakshmi's father	
2015	Kirumi	Club Owner	
2015	Maanga		
2016	Kaththi Sandai	MLA Sivagnanam	
2016	Yokkiyan Varan Somba Thooki Ulla Vai		
2016	Unnodu Ka	Keerthivasan	
2017	Uruthikol		
2018	Eghantham		
2018	Sandakozhi 2	Durai Ayya's brother-in-law	
2019	Petta	Minister Thangam	
2019	En Kaadhali Scene Podura		
2019	Butler Balu	Shalini's father	
2021	Idhu Vibathu Paghuthi		
2022	Saayam		
2023	Dhillu Irundha Poradu		

== Television ==
Year	Title	Role	Channel
2007	Madurai	Murugesan	Vijay TV
2018	Oviya	Munnusamy	Colors Tamil
2019	Rasaathi	Rasappan	Sun TV
