= Aanai =

2005 film directed by Selva

- DVD cover
- Directed by: Selvaa
- Written by: Selvaa; G. K. Gopinath
- Produced by: K. S. Sreenivasan
- Starring: Arjun; Namitha; Keerthi Chawla
- Cinematography: K. S. Shiva
- Edited by: S. Sathish; J. N. Harsh
- Music by: D. Imman
- Production company: Vasan Visual Ventures
- Release date: 2 December 2005
- Country: India
- Language: Tamil

Aanai: Born to Fight (transl. Order) is a 2005 Indian Tamil-language vigilante action film directed and co-written by Selvaa. The film stars Arjun, Namitha and Keerthi Chawla, while Vadivelu, Sanghavi and Manoj K. Jayan play pivotal roles. D. Imman composed the soundtrack, while Shiva was the cinematographer. It is a remake of the 2004 American film Man on Fire. The film was released on 2 December 2005.

== Plot ==
Vijay is an ex-police officer who is persuaded by his former boss to be the bodyguard of a millionaire's 8-year-old daughter named Priya. However, Priya gets kidnapped by a militant called Ahmed Khan in London, where Vijay sets out on a rampage to exact vengeance and save Priya.

== Cast ==
- Arjun as Vijay
- Namitha as Ramya
- Keerthi Chawla as Sandhya
- Vadivelu
- Manoj K. Jayan as Jayaram
- Mahadevan as police inspector
- Sanghavi as Meena Jayaram
- Subha Sandeep (guest appearance)
- Narasimha
- Baby Taj as Priya
- Thalaivasal Vijay
- Delhi Ganesh
- Ranganath
- Raj Kapoor
- O. A. K. Sundar as police officer
- Periya Karuppu Thevar
- Chelladurai
- Singamuthu
- Jasper (photo appearance)
- Thambi Ramaiah as RTO officer
- Bava Lakshmanan
- Muthukaalai
- Poovilangu Mohan
- Karate Raja
- Halwa Vasu
- Vijay Ganesh
- Bonda Mani
- Aryan
- Krishnamoorthy
- Citizen Mani
- Annapurnamma as Vijay's mother
- Junior Silk

== Production ==
Selva, who had directed Arjun in Karnaa (1995) and the long delayed Manikanda (2006) was signed by Vasan Visual Ventures to work with him again. The actor signed on for a hiked price of ₹1 crore (equivalent to ₹3.4 crore or US$350,000 in 2023), following the success of his previous film Giri. The unit had a 15-day shooting stint in Hyderabad in February 2005, with two of the lead actresses Namitha and Sanghavi involved in the shoot. The film featured a new editing technique tried by Satish and Harsha, while the team shot three songs with Arjun and Namitha in London, notably near the London Eye and Windsor Castle. Another song "Kada Seema Kada" was shot with Arjun and Namitha at Mohan Studio in Chennai, with the actor notably wearing four inch heels to make up for height difference with the actress. This is the Tamil debut of Keerthi Chawla. During the making of the film, allegations arose that Arjun had been sending lewd messages to Namitha, which led to a brief furore on sets.

== Soundtrack ==
The soundtrack album was composed by D. Imman. The audio launch was held in August 2005.

Track listing
No.	Title	Lyrics	Singer(s)	Length
1.	"Aanai" (English)	D. Imman	D. Imman
2.	"Hey Idupattum"	Pa. Vijay	D. Imman, Srilekha Parthasarathy
3.	"Azhagiya Darisanam"	Palani Bharathi	Madhu Balakrishnan, Binni Krishnakumar
4.	"Chinnajiru Kilye"	Bharathiyar	Ananthu
5.	"Figurudan Oru Naal"	Na. Muthukumar	Karthik, Saindhavi
6.	"Kumru Kumrur"	Pa. Vijay	Sirkazhi Sivachidambaram, Annupamaa
7.	"Midukkanavaney"	Pa. Vijay	Balram, Mathangi Jagdish
8.	"Sare Jahan Se Acha"	Muhammad Iqbal	Srinivas
9.	"Enthan Varungala Veetukaraney"	Victor Dass	Rita Thyagarajan

== Critical reception ==
S. R. Ashok Kumar of The Hindu wrote, "Director Selva has wrapped it all up quite well but it is in the second half that he loses his way letting some unwanted songs and fights hamper the flow", criticised Chawla's performance but praised K. S. Shiva's cinematography, Gopinath's dialogues, and Selva's screenplay and direction. Sify wrote, "what could have been an edge-of-the-seat thriller ends up as a badly made mass-masala movie", concluding that the film is "disappointing". Malini Mannath Chennai Online wrote "It's a typical Arjun flick with guns blazing and the 'Action King' all set out to destroy his new set of enemies single-handedly. But this time the foes are not from across the border — probably there has been a surfeit of it — so the patriotism factor, so much a part of his films, is missing here. And for Arjun, it's just yet another role to re-establish his credentials as the 'Action King', for, how much variations can he bring into a role he'd done innumerable times earlier!".
