= Jore (film) =

- Poster
- Directed by: Selvaa
- Written by: Selvaa; G. K. Gopinath (dialogues)
- Produced by: C. Swarupa Lakshmi; C. Sarat Babu
- Starring: Sathyaraj; Sibiraj; Gajala; Bhanupriya
- Cinematography: U.K. Senthil Kumar
- Edited by: Rahubob
- Music by: Deva
- Production company: Sena Films
- Release date: 11 June 2004
- Running time: 140 min
- Country: India
- Language: Tamil

Jore is a 2004 Indian Tamil-language action film directed by Selvaa, starring Sathyaraj along with his son Sibiraj. It was released on 11 June 2004.

== Plot ==
Sabapathy (Sathyaraj) is a widower who owns a cinema theater and a school. He treats his son Sakthi (Sibiraj) like his friend. In college, he falls for Shalini (Gajala), the daughter of a corrupt politician named Lingam (Kota Srinivasa Rao). Afterwards, Lingam's son Vijay (Ramana) clashes against Sakthi at the college election. Despite having support from his father, Vijay loses the election. Lingam then enters into the conflict. In the end, Sakthi kills both Lingam and Vijay.

== Cast ==
- Sathyaraj as Sabapathy
- Sibiraj as Sakthi
- Gajala as Shalini
- Bhanupriya as Meenakshi
- Vadivelu as Thirupathi
- Kota Srinivasa Rao as Lingam
- Ramana as Vijay
- Sathyapriya as Lingam's wife
- Sharmili as Pamela
- Sindhu
- Viji Chandrasekhar
- Theni Kunjarammal
- Bala Singh
- Thennavan
- Besant Ravi
- Swathi Shanmugam
- O. A. K. Sundar as Police inspector
- Cheran Raj
- Thambi Ramaiah
- Krishnamoorthy
- Chelladurai
- Vijay Ganesh
- Nellai Siva

== Production ==
After his debut film Student Number 1, Sibiraj signs his second film with the same production banner, Sena Films. And this time sharing frames with him is father Satyaraj, the duo carrying their real-life roles into reel-life and playing father and son. While Gajala plays the romantic interest of Sibiraj, Bhanupriya plays Satyaraj's wife in the film. The film was launched on 18 August 2003 at Prasad Studios.

The cast also includes Telugu villain Kota Srinivasa Rao (of 'Saamy' fame) and Vadivelu among others. Shooting commenced at Pollachi on 25 December, with a schedule of about 30 days at locations in Udumalaipettai and Marayur. The songs are to be shot abroad.

== Soundtrack ==
The soundtrack was composed by Deva.

Song	Singer(s)	Lyrics	Duration
"Bad Boya"	Chinmayi, Prasanna Rao	Annamalai	5:02
"Jore Bada Jore"	Karthik	Na. Muthukumar	4:48
"Mummy Chellama"	Srikanth Deva, Srilekha Parthasarathy	Na. Muthukumar	4:14
"Muttikkalama"	Tippu, Manikka Vinayagam	Piraisoodan	4:12
"Un Uthattukku"	Tippu, Pop Shalini	Kabilan	5:14

== Reception ==
BizHat described "It's interesting to watch the father – son combination together in Jore. Sibi Raj has matched up to his father's acting and gives a good account as an actor". Malathi Rangarajan of The Hindu wrote "Incidentally, makers shouldn't give titles that lend themselves to rhyme or pun. You are so tempted to call "Jore" a bore. The shallow storyline, loose screenplay and inept direction — all by Selva — are the bane of "Jore"".
