= Rojavanam =

- DVD cover
- Directed by: Selvaa
- Written by: Murthy Ramesh; Nagulan Ponnusamy (dialogues)
- Screenplay by: Selvaa
- Story by: Selvaa
- Produced by: Rajam Balachandar
- Starring: Karthik; Malavika; Laila
- Cinematography: R. Raghunatha Reddy
- Edited by: Suresh Urs
- Music by: Bharadwaj
- Production company: Kavithalayaa Productions
- Release date: 30 July 1999
- Running time: 150 minutes
- Country: India
- Language: Tamil

Rojavanam (transl. Garden of roses) is a 1999 Indian Tamil-language romantic drama film directed by Selvaa and produced by Kavithalayaa Productions. The film stars Karthik, Laila and Malavika. It was released on 30 July 1999.

== Plot ==
Muthu is the favourite employee at Rojavanam, an old age home owned jointly by two friends in Ooty. Sindhu is a psychology student staying near the home who falls in love with Muthu. But Muthu develops a liking towards Roja, the daughter of his boss, and later learns that the boss and his friend had decided long ago that their children would be married. This has resulted in the friend's son Siva growing up enamoured of Roja. Roja also has a liking towards Muthu and her father accepts Muthu as his son-in-law, but his friend, angered at this, decides to bulldoze Rojavanam to the ground. Muthu steps in to solve the problem and convinces Roja to marry Siva as per their parents wishes, so that Rojavanam will be saved. Muthu makes Roja understand Siva's love for her and gets them both married. Siva and Roja's parents feel happy and Rojavanam is saved. In the end, Sindhu is married to Muthu.

== Cast ==
- Karthik as Muthu
- Malavika as Sindhu
- Laila as Roja
- Akash as Siva
- Kuyili as Roja's aunt
- Ravi Kumar
- Nizhalgal Ravi
- M. N. Nambiar
- M. S. Viswanathan
- Manorama
- Ramesh Khanna
- Jai Ganesh
- Kaka Radhakrishnan
- Thalapathy Dinesh
- Ragasudha
- Rangammal
- Dhamu

== Production ==
The team of the successful tamil film Pooveli (1998) came together to make Rojavanam and chose Karthik to play the lead role again. Initially the team approached Isha Koppikar to play the lead female role, but her unavailability led to the team casting newcomer Laila. Four songs were shot abroad in France and Switzerland.

Jai Akash, a Tamilian of Sri Lankan origin settled in London, sent his modelling photographs to the "Star Search" service run by Suhasini's entertainment portal website TamilTalkies.com during the late 1990s. K. Balachander, when casting a new actor to portray a small role in the film, used Star Search and selected Akash to be in the film.

== Soundtrack ==
The soundtrack was composed by Bharadwaj. Lyrics were written by Vairamuthu and Palani Bharathi.

Track listing
No.	Title	Singer(s)	Length
1.	"Adi Aathadi"	S. P. Balasubrahmanyam	4:49
2.	"Enna Idhu Enna Idhu"	Anuradha Sriram	5:42
3.	"Maname Maname"	S. P. Balasubrahmanyam	5:46
4.	"Maname Maname"	Srinivas	5:47
5.	"Pollacchi Santhaiyile"	Yugendran	5:12
6.	"Unnai Partha Kangal"	Hariharan	5:27
Total length:			32:43

== Release and reception ==
Rojavanam was released on 30 July 1999. K. P. S. of Kalki wrote that director Selva got an amazing concept about old age home but since love was given too many importance, it felt like thorns hanging from the strung flowers. Thamarai Manalan of Dinakaran wrote, "Director Selva has chosen a heart-touching subject but the extreme type of the romantic extravaganza of the old-age inmates of the house has lessened the importance and the basic merit of the central concept of the picture". Sify wrote, "As the soft spoken man who humours everybody and defuses situations Karthik has done a good job and is aided well by Laila as the pretty girl in love. Malavika has very little to do. An offbeat music by Bharadwaj and cinematography by Raghunath Reddy add to the film's value". Dinesh won the Tamil Nadu State Film Award for Best Stunt Coordinator.
