= Alludugaaru Vachcharu =

1999 film by Ravi Raja Pinisetty

- DVD cover
- Directed by: Ravi Raja Pinisetty
- Written by: Posani Krishna Murali (dialogues)
- Screenplay by: Ravi Raja Pinisetty
- Story by: Selva
- Based on: Pooveli (Tamil)
- Produced by: Sunkara Madhu Murali; Mullapudi Brahmanandam
- Starring: Jagapati Babu; Kausalya; Heera Rajagopal
- Cinematography: V. Jayaram
- Edited by: A. Sreekar Prasad
- Music by: M. M. Keeravani
- Production companies: M.R.C & Melody Theaters
- Release date: 18 June 1999
- Running time: 152 minutes
- Country: India
- Language: Telugu

Alludugaaru Vachcharu (transl. Son-in-law has come) is a 1999 Telugu-language drama film directed by Ravi Raja Pinisetty. It stars Jagapati Babu, Kausalya, Heera Rajagopal and music composed by M. M. Keeravani. The film is a remake of the Tamil movie Pooveli (1998) which is itself an unofficial remake of A Walk in the Clouds (1995).

== Cast ==
- Jagapati Babu as Murali
- Kausalya as Mahalakshmi "Maha"
- Heera Rajagopal as Shalini
- Abbas as Madhu
- Nassar as Raghava Rao
- Srihari as Srihari
- Giri Babu as Shankar Rao
- Brahmanandam
- M. M. Keeravani as himself
- Tanikella Bharani as Madhu's father
- M. S. Narayana as Ateesu
- AVS as Inspector
- Sarika Ramachandra Rao as Madman
- Gadiraju Subba Raju as Murthy
- Mithai Chitti as Master
- Rama Prabha as Mahalakshmi's grandmother
- Rajitha as Shankar Rao's wife
- Delhi Rajeswari as Maha's mother
- Amesha Jalil as Rajyam
- Madhurisen as Shalini's friend
- Sudeepa Pinky as Mahalakshmi's sister
- Oorvasi Patil
- Master Tanish
- Baby Vaishnavi

== Soundtrack ==
Alludugaaru Vachcharu

Film score by M. M. Keeravani
- Released: 1999
- Genre: Soundtrack
- Length: 27:31
- Label: His Master's Voice
- Producer: M. M. Keeravani

M. M. Keeravani chronology
Seetharama Raju (1999)	Alludugaaru Vachcharu (1999)	Papa The Great (2000)

The music is composed by M. M. Keeravani. Lyrics were written by Sirivennela Sitarama Satry. It was released by His Master's Voice. Telugu Cinema wrote "Keeravani seems to have taken special interest in all songs. Violin is extensively used, as Hero in the movie is a violin player. Out of 6 songs only two are duets. Male singers sing remaining songs. One more peculiarity of this cassette is that Keeravani did not repeat any of the male singers. If you listen to these songs twice, you will get addicted to them".

No.	Title	Singer(s)	Length
1.	"Chaalichalani Kulukulalona"	Jayachandran, K. S. Chithra	5:14
2.	"Marugela Musugela"	Hariharan	5:00
3.	"Gundelo Sandadi"	Sashi Preetham, K. S. Chithra	3:28
4.	"Rangu Rangu Rekkala"	M. M. Keeravani	4:54
5.	"Aiswarya Rai Neeku"	Naveen	4:30
6.	"Noraara Pilichina"	S. P. Balasubrahmanyam	4:25
Total length:			27:31

== Reception ==
A critic from Sify wrote that "Apart from the tear-jerking glycerine loaded scenes and the prolonged climax, the film fails to sustain viewer`s interest unless one can bear the sentimental stuff. Music by Keeravani doesn’t add any lustre to the movie either. The only attraction for the youth being the song sequences shot on Jagapathi Babu and Heera!" The film was also reviewed by Zamin Ryot. Andhra Today wrote "The highlight of the movie is the director's excellent screenplay. In spite of being an excellent director, due recognition has eluded him because of his lapses in choosing story. Having similarities to other movies like Rukmini, Alludugaru, etc. the movie fails to impress or hold the attention of the audience. Climax, which is the lifeline of a movie, is stretched unnecessarily and tests the patience of the audience".
