= Amaravathy (film) =

1993 film directed by Selva

- Theatrical release poster
- Directed by: Selvaa
- Written by: Selvaa; J. Ramesh (dialogues)
- Produced by: Chozha Ponnurangam
- Starring: Ajith Kumar; Sanghavi
- Cinematography: B. Balamurugan
- Edited by: Raju KN
- Music by: Bala Bharathi
- Production company: Chozha Creations
- Release date: 3 August 1993
- Running time: 146 minutes
- Country: India
- Language: Tamil

Amaravathy (/əməˈrɑːvəθɪ/ ə-muh-rah-vuh-thi) is a 1993 Indian Tamil-language romance film directed by Selvaa. The film stars newcomers Ajith Kumar and Sanghavi. It was released on 3 August 1993 to a mixed reviews & moderate box-office success

== Plot ==
An old couple are heartbroken because their only daughter runs away with her lover. At that time they see Amaravathy who is a naive and beautiful girl who runs away from home but does not remember anything else. They decide to take to the police but instead want to raise her as their own daughter. she finds shelter in their house where she is well taken care of. Her life takes a turn when Arjun son of a rich business man falls in love with her. Arjun finds excuses to meet her in her house and gets well known with the family. One day with the help of Amaravathy's friend he manages to lure her into his house without her parents knowing and expresses his love for her and starts taking her to places and they start having the happiest days of their life. But her foster father fears she will elope too so forbids her to see Arjun but her father understands that they are deeply in love with each other. Just then a newspaper shows there is a missing girl called Angeline and she bears resemblance to Amaravathy. Arjun sees this and thinks it is Amaravathy. Just then a doctor comes and recognises Amaravathy as Angeline and tells Arjun and her foster parents she is Angeline the daughter of a rich businessman. She and her father never got over the loss of her mother and her uncle tortures them to give him the wealth and Angeline's hand in marriage and makes sure they tell nobody about him., Her father and her decide to kill themselves so they can escape the torture. Her father dies but Angel survives and has amnesia and has forgotten everything. Then the uncle kidnaps Amaravathy to force her into marriage and also tries to misbehave with her and just then Arjun fights him and rescues her. Arjun and Amaravathy live happily and also it is shown that nobody ever told Amaravathy about her past because they did not want to upset her.

== Cast ==
- Ajith Kumar as Arjun (dubbed by Vikram)
- Sanghavi as Amaravathy (Angelin)
- Kalyan Kumar as Balasubramaniam
- Thalaivasal Vijay as Dr. Charle (credited as Vijay)
- Ra. Sankaran as Church Father
- Charle as Seethapathy, Saloon shop owner
- Junior Balaiah as Rickshaw driver
- Murali Kumar as Arjun's friend
- Kumaresan as Vegetable seller
- Cheenu Mohan as Bus conductor
- Kavitha as Raji, Balasubramaniam's wife
- Sabitha as Arjun's aunty
- Mounika as Geetha, Balasubramaniam's daughter
- Vichithra (special appearance in the song "Adi Soku Sundari")
- C. R. Saraswathy as Doctor
- Nizhalgal Ravi as Rathnavel, Police officer
- Nassar as Frank, Angelin's father
- Bhanu Prakash as Gowtham, Arjun's friend (credited as Bharathan)

== Production ==
After the success of Thalaivaasal, Selvaa began a love story featuring newcomers. The producers were unhappy with the work of the newcomers and they soon approached Ajith Kumar to play the lead role after S. P. Balasubrahmanyam had recommended him, after seeing parts of Prema Pusthakam. Ajith signed the film on 3 August 1992, making his debut in Tamil as a lead actor. Similarly, the lead actress Sanghavi was 16 years old when the film started production. After the success of "Unnai Thottu" from Thalaivaasal, Selvaa signed Bala Bharathi to compose the music. As the film went into post production, Ajith was bed-ridden due to a racing injury and remained in treatment for twenty months. Subsequently, another actor Vikram had to dub scenes for Ajith.

== Music ==
The music is composed by Bala Bharathi.

All lyrics are written by Vairamuthu.

Track listing
No.	Title	Singer(s)	Length
1.	"Adi Soku Sundari"	S. P. Balasubrahmanyam, Malgudi Subha	4:58
2.	"Ha Ha Kanaveh Thana"	S. P. Balasubrahmanyam	4:34
3.	"Poo Malaranthethu"	Minmini	4:13
4.	"Putham Pudhu Malare"	S. P. Balasubrahmanyam	5:02
5.	"Tajumahal Thevailla"	S. P. Balasubrahmanyam, S. Janaki	4:09
6.	"Udal Enna Uyir Enna"	Ashok	4:40
Total length:			31:06

== Release and reception ==
Amaravathy was released on 4 June 1993. Malini Mannath wrote for The Indian Express, "Producer Chozha Ponnurangan and writer-director Chelvaa [...] come together again in [Amaravathi], which despite its flaws, is a fairly engaging entertainer that has romance, suspense and sentiments in the proper proportions."

The film was profitable and the success was partly credited to the chart-topping soundtracks composed by Bala Bharathi. The film also gained media attention for its lead actor, Ajith, who was approached with several modelling assignments.
