= James Pandu =

- Title card
- Directed by: Selvaa
- Written by: Suki Murthy; Nagulan Ponnusamy (dialogues)
- Story by: Parthiban
- Produced by: V. Sundar
- Starring: Parthiban; Prabhu Deva; Kausalya; Renu Desai
- Cinematography: Thangar Bachan
- Edited by: Suresh Urs
- Music by: S. A. Rajkumar
- Production company: Vishwas
- Release date: 4 May 2000
- Country: India
- Language: Tamil

James Pandu is a 2000 Indian Tamil-language comedy thriller film directed by Selvaa and produced by V. Sundar. The film stars Parthiban (who also wrote the story) and Prabhu Deva in the lead roles alongside Kausalya and Renu Desai. It was released on 4 May 2000.

== Plot ==
James and Pandu are porters. Though they were inseparable friends before, there is no love lost between them now. James is in love with Renu, while Kausalya, a mute, has feelings for Pandu. A chit fund company owner hires James to "steal" a bag of money from himself so he could abscond with the money, but his manager hires Pandu to steal the bag from James. When James and Pandu lay their hands on the money, they become friends again and decide to split the money. However, the company owner is found murdered, and they become the prime suspects. In the climax, Raghavachari comes to court and tells the truth that he killed the company owner because the latter would cheat many people. James and Pandu are both proven innocent.

== Cast ==
- Parthiban as Pandu
- Prabhu Deva as James
- Kausalya as Kausalya
- Renu Desai as Renu
- Nizhalgal Ravi as Karpagam Chit Funds Owner
- Thalaivasal Vijay as Karpagam Chit Funds Manager
- Pandu as Police Inspector
- Ravikumar as Police Inspector
- Easwari Rao as Kausalya's sister
- Madhan Bob
- Mayilsamy
- Bonda Mani
- K. Sivasankar as Railway Porter
- Balu Anand as Railway Porter
- Sukran as Railway Porter
- Scissor Manohar as Railway Porter
- Manobala as Railway Porter
- Maayi Sundar as Railway Porter
- Vijay Ganesh as Railway Porter
- Pollachi Babu as Police Inspector
- Periya Karuppu Thevar as Man asking for donation
- Nellai Siva as Man asking for donation
- Kovai Senthil as Travelling Ticket Examiner
- Amalraj Vathiyar
- Vijaya Singh
- Deepika
- Sridevi
- Sunanda
- Baby Anu as Kausalya's niece
- Jayamani as Bus Conductor
- Soori as Railway Porter (uncredited role)
- T. S. B. K. Moulee as TTR Raghavachari (guest appearance)
- Shari (guest appearance)

== Production ==
The film saw Parthiban and Prabhu Deva acting together for first time, though they appeared previously together in Suyamvaram but they did not have any scenes together. Selva had initially titled the film as Visil, before renaming the project. The title of the film is a play on the name of fictional British secret agent James Bond. Isha Koppikar was initially cast in the film. The first shot was taken at the Arunachalam studios. The unit picturised two songs in the snowy and hilly areas of Gangtok in Sikkim. There at a height of 14,000 feet (4,300 m) is based an army camp, reported the highest situated army camp in the world. The unit, that got the permission to shoot there, had much difficulty picturising the songs in the cold hilly area, but have returned triumphant. Participating in the songs were Prabhu Deva and Renu. A ten days shooting schedule in Chennai followed by shooting, at places like Hyderabad, Chalakkudi and Mercara.

== Soundtrack ==
Soundtrack was composed by S. A. Rajkumar. The song "Kannena Minsarama" is based on "Rona" by Alabina.

Title	Singer(s)	Lyrics	Length
"James Pandu Da"	Mano, Unni Menon	Kalidasan	04:09
"Kannena Minsarama"	Devan Ekambaram, Bombay Jayashri	Na. Muthukumar	04:23
"Nikkattuma Nadakattuma"	Mano, Anuradha Sriram	Bharathi Sakthi	04:31
"Un Azhagai"	Srinivas, Reshmi	Viveka	05:04
"Vennila Ethuvum"	S. P. Balasubrahmanyam, Reshmi	Thamarai	04:06

== Reception ==
India Info wrote "In the name of comedy the two heroes indulge in so many senseless antics that it makes you sick. As the story is credited to R Parthipan he is solely responsible for this disaster". The Hindu wrote, "A film that begins on an interesting note but soon dwindles into something different". Malini Mannath wrote for Chennai Online, "James Pandu is Selva's ' holiday special,' where one doesn't have to tax one's intelligence at all. So enjoy it kids!". Kalki wrote that in order to make a comedy, the makers chose a plot with thriller which is quite strong, they could have made a thriller instead of comedy. Dinakaran wrote "As there's running and chasing of characters throughout length of the film, the story's treatment doesn't show any signs of (positive) grip! The way Bondu and James struggle and stumble as they carry the money bag along with them sounds nonsensical rather than comical!".
