= Allround =

Allround may refer to:

- Dual-sport motorcycle
- All-around event in gymnastics
- World Allround Speed Skating Championships
- All round defence (military)

== See also ==
- All-rounder, a player who can both bat and bowl in cricket
- All Rounder (1984 film), an Indian film
- All Rounder (1998 film), an Indian film
