= Selvaa (director) =

Indian film director

- Education: Pachaiyappa's College
- Occupation: Director
- Years active: 1992–present

Selvaa is an Indian director who works in the Tamil film industry. He often specializes in film remakes and directed a series of hits the 1990s. His first film Thalaivasal launched the career of many. His noted film are Amaravathy, Karnaa, Pooveli, Unnaruge Naan Irundhal, and Naan Avanillai. He introduced Ajith Kumar through his second film Amaravathy.

== Early life ==
Selva was graduated from Pachaiyappa's College. Selva first joined as an assistant director in an advertising firm which was involved in making ad film, documentary and short films.

== Career ==
He worked in his first television serial titled Thyagam. At that time, he directed a documentary film on the Tamil poet Subramanya Bharathi which was screened in Delhi Doordarshan. This innovative concept was appreciated by everyone and the documentary served as an entry ticket for his next project wherein he was asked to direct eminent writer Akilan’s award winning novel Chithira Paavai which was to be telecast in Doordarshan. It was a thirteen episode serial which had Vaishnavi, Fathima Babu, Nassar and many leading TV personalities. Though Chithira Paavai earned him a good repute, He was yet to become popular. Selva then directed the serial Soorya for Sun TV with M. K. Stalin who played the title role. Subsequently, he received another offer to direct a TV serial called Neela Mala from Chozha creations. The success of the serial facilitated Chozha creation’s re-entry into film world and they gave him the first opportunity to direct Thalaivaasal in 1992. The film dealt with drug problems in college and it completed a 100-day run at the box-office. His next venture was Amaravathy with newcomers Ajith Kumar and Sanghavi starring. He then directed Karnaa with Arjun, marking their first collaboration, the film did well at the box office and it was best known for the chartbuster "Malare Mounama".

In 1997, he briefly worked on the pre-production of a film titled Thenaali Raja with Arjun and Nivedita Jain, but the film was later shelved. Despite the commercial failure of Sishya, Karthik chose to collaborate with Selva again in Pooveli and the film became a large commercial success. The success of the film subsequently brought him several offers including the opportunity to make a third film with Karthik in Rojavanam, a romantic love story set in the backdrop of an old people's home. He also shortly after planned other projects including Oruvar Manathilae Oruvaradi and Kai Korthu Vaa with Karthik, and Nanba with Arjun, which ultimately failed to materialise despite nearing completion.

He introduced actor Sathyaraj's son Sibiraj in Student Number 1 while he was also instrumental in collaborating them in his directorial Jore while they collaborated with another project Ma. Mu which failed to proceed after the launch. Selva again collaborated with Arjun in Aanai and Manikanda. Manikanda was initially begun in 2003. It languished in development hell due to financial problems faced by the producer, and was finally released in 2007 after a long delay. Selva decided to remake K. Balachander's Naan Avan Illai with Jeevan playing the lead role with the film becoming successful, director and actor collaborated with another project Thotta which was restarted after it was shelved during 2005.

The success of Naan Avanillai, prompted Selva to make a sequel featuring Jeevan in the same character with five new female characters. Shot predominantly throughout Europe, the film failed to replicate the success of the prequel and Selva subsequently opted against making a third film in the series. Another remake, that of Nootrukku Nooru (1971), which he had planned featuring Vinay and Sneha, was called after pre-production stages following the financial problems of producers Kavithalayaa Productions.

Selva directed Naanga which introduced children of noted film personalities. The film was released to mixed reviews and went unnoticed due to its low key release. He then directed Naadi Thudikkuthadi with newcomers and it marked Selva's first collaboration with music director Ilaiyaraaja, but the film is yet to be released while his another directorial Muriyadi with Sathyaraj is also unreleased. Selva announced that he is directing Vendru Va featuring Jeevan acting after his sabbatical from films while also announced that he would collaborate with Aravind Swamy in a project titled Vanangamudi.

== Filmography ==
Films

| Year | Film | Notes | | |
|---|---|---|---|---|
| Year | Film | Notes | 1992 | Thalaivaasal |
| 1993 | Amaravathy | | | |
| 1995 | Karnaa | | | |
| 1997 | Pudhayal | | | |
| 1997 | Sishya | | | |
| 1998 | Pooveli | | | |
| 1999 | Suyamvaram | | | |
| 1999 | Rojavanam | | | |
| 1999 | Unnaruge Naan Irundhal | | | |
| 1999 | Aasaiyil Oru Kaditham | | | |
| 2000 | James Pandu | | | |
| 2003 | Student Number 1 | | | |
| 2004 | Jore | | | |
| 2005 | Aanai | | | |
| 2006 | Nenjil | | | |
| 2007 | Naan Avanillai | | | |
| 2007 | Manikanda | | | |
| 2008 | Thotta | | | |
| 2009 | Guru En Aalu | | | |
| 2009 | Naan Avanillai 2 | | | |
| 2012 | Naanga | | | |

Television

- Neela Mala (DD Podhigai)
- Chithirai Paavai (DD Podhigai)
- Run (Sun TV)
- Vanathai Pola (Sun TV)
