= Ilaiyavan =

- Title card
- Directed by: T. Babu
- Produced by: M. Sivakumar
- Starring: Sathyan; Kausalya; Karan
- Cinematography: Velamuri Ranga
- Music by: Ilaiyaraaja
- Production company: Shenbagam Movies
- Release date: 22 September 2000
- Country: India
- Language: Tamil

Ilaiyavan (transl. Young Man) is a 2000 Indian Tamil-language film directed by T. Babu. The film stars Sathyan and Kausalya, while Sivakumar and Srividya play supporting roles. The film, which had music composed by Ilaiyaraaja, opened on 22 September 2000.

== Cast ==
- Sathyan as Bharathi
- Kausalya as Janani
- Karan as Prabhakar
- Sivakumar
- Srividya as Bharathi's mother
- Thalaivasal Vijay
- Vaiyapuri as Bharathi's friend
- Madhan Bob as Bharathi's father
- S. N. Lakshmi as Bharathi's grandmother
- Fathima Babu
- T. S. Raghavendra
- Ponnambalam
- Chaplin Balu as Bharathi's friend
- Balaji as Bharathi's friend

== Production ==
The film marked the debut of Sathyan, nephew of actor Sathyaraj and son of producer Madhampatti Sivakumar, in a leading role.

== Soundtrack ==
The music was composed by Ilaiyaraaja.

Track listing
| No. | Title | Lyrics | Singer(s) | Length |
|---|---|---|---|---|
| 1. | "Nilavil Amuthu" | Palani Bharathi | P. Unnikrishnan, Bhavatharini | 5:13 |
| 2. | "En Jeevanin" | Pulamaipithan | S. P. Balasubrahmanyam | 5:29 |
| 3. | "En Idhayam" | Arivumathi | P. Unnikrishnan, K. S. Chithra | 4:52 |
| 4. | "Vatta Nilave" | Mu. Metha | S. P. Balasubrahmanyam, Swarnalatha | 5:15 |
| 5. | "Sinukku Sinukkunnu" | Palani Bharathi | Mano | 5:08 |
| Total length: | | | | 25:57 |

== Reception ==
S. R. Ashok Kumar from The Hindu wrote that "melodious music, enchanting visuals, good dialogues, all these and other plus points offset the mediocre screenplay of Shenbagam Movies Ilayavan". Saraswathy Srinivas wrote for Sify that "Debutant Sathyan, nephew and look-alike of actor Sathyaraj with an ungainly gait and irritatingly squeaky voice is not hero stuff. Director T.Babu has chosen the wrong vehicle to make his debut. Kausalya either goes around with a plastic grin plastered on her face or spits fire and brimstone and shrieks like a banshie", concluding, "Some characters! Some story!! And some film!!!". Malini Mannath of Chennai Online wrote, "Debutant director Balu seems to be bogged down by the sheer pressure of delivering the goods, with the odds heavily stacked against him". Indiainfo wrote, "The whole film is stuck in a time capsule called the past [...] Camerawork, by veteran Ranga, too, is reminiscent of the seventies style. And with such old baggage around how can Satyan make a leap into the future?".
