= Thotta =

- Poster
- Directed by: Selvaa
- Written by: Selvaa; Ramesh Selvan (dialogues)
- Produced by: Mariappa Babu Baskar
- Starring: Jeevan; Priyamani
- Cinematography: U. K. Senthil Kumar
- Music by: Srikanth Deva
- Production company: Oscar Movies
- Release date: 29 February 2008
- Running time: 150 minutes
- Country: India
- Language: Tamil

Thotta (/θoʊttɑː/ transl. Bullet) is a 2008 Indian Tamil-language gangster film directed by Selvaa and produced by Mariappa Babu Baskar of Oscar Movies. The film stars Jeevan and Priyamani alongside Mallika, Sampath Raj, Hema Chaudhary and Charan Raj in supporting roles. It began production in 2005 but was released only on 29 February 2008.

== Plot ==
Shanmugham comes to Chennai with his mother in search of his father. When they get to the place, they see him living with another wife. He kills the wife and sends Shanmugham outside. Shanmugham comes out with his dead mother, and an auto driver helps him cremate the body, gives money to him, and asks him to go back to his own city.

Shanmugham wanted to become a great man but got caught with corrupt police officers and was used for their job. When he grows up, he becomes a big rowdy by the name of Thotta. The highly corrupt police officer DCP Muthuvel also uses him for a lot of encounters, for which he takes credit and gets promoted to commissioner. In one incident where he is asked to put acid on a girl Nalina's face, he finds that girl to be the auto driver's daughter. He loves Nalina and helps her family.

Nalina's aim is to become a police officer, and she tells this to Shanmugham. As he has commissioner influence, he promises to get her the job. For this, he kills a minister, who is a big rival of Chief Minister Manimaran. When Nalina goes to Muthuvel for the job, the latter insists that she have sex with him. When Shanmugham finds out what happened, he and Muthuvel part ways.

Shanmugham's friend Giri, who is also a rowdy, but gets him married to Gauri. She wants to separate him from this rowdy group and get settled, for which she tries not to send him for their encounters. After much thought, Shanmugham lets them go separately, but Muthuvel kills Giri. CBI officer Prabhakar wants to get Shanmugham alive, whereas Muthuvel wants him killed, otherwise he would be in deep trouble as he was the one who made Shanmugham a rowdy. How Shanmugham overpowers this duo and whether Nalina becomes a police officer forms the climax of the story.

== Cast ==
- Jeevan as Shanmugham aka Thotta
- Priyamani as Nalina
- Mallika as Gauri
- Vishnupriyan as Giri
- Hema Choudhary as Vana Roja
- Sampath Raj as DCP Muthuvel
- Charan Raj as CBI officer Prabhakar
- Livingston as Chief Minister Manimaran
- Chandrasekhar as Nalina's father
- Raj Kapoor as Shanmugam's father
- O. A. K. Sundar as Minister's son
- Santhana Bharathi
- Thalaivasal Vijay
- Chelladurai
- Mayilsamy
- Dhamu
- Sujatha Sivakumar
- Sabitha Anand
- Neepa
- Thalapathy Dinesh
- Besant Ravi

== Production ==
The film began production in 2005. It was shelved midway and revived only in 2007. Despite the delay, Selva was confident the film would succeed, citing Jeevan and Priyamani's booming market in the interim years.

== Soundtrack ==
The film has 5 songs and one instrumental composed by Srikanth Deva. Saraswathy Srinivas of Rediff.com rated the album 2 out of 5, saying, "Srikanth Deva's music in Thotta just breezes past you with no lingering quality".

Song	Singers	Lyrics
"Anbe Vaa"	Tanvi Shah, Gopal Sharma	Palani Bharathi
"Mugam Poo"	Chinmayi, Naresh Iyer	Pa. Vijay
"Saami Aaduda"	Senthildass Velayutham, Surmukhi Raman, Archith	Kabilan
"Theme Of Thotta"	Instrumental	
"Va Va Va Mappillai"	Srikanth Deva, Janani Bharadwaj, Archith	Palani Bharathi
"Venum Venum"	Jaidev, Sangeetha Rajeshwaran	Pa. Vijay

== Critical reception ==
Nandhu Sundaram wrote for Rediff.com, "Selva's singular failure is in infusing any emotion in the movie. The screenplay is a maze of twists and turns, none of them believable". Sify wrote, "This Thotta (transl. bullet) just does not fire and is a rehash of so many films, and has nothing new to offer and is predictable". Sudhish Kamath of The Hindu wrote, "Overall, Thotta is racy for most parts, sprinting through the motions we have seen a hundred times before and yet continue to see only because our heroes give us no choice. Only for the bored and the desperate". Kabilan of Kalki praised the acting, screenplay, dialogues, direction, climax, cinematography but criticised the music.
