= Thirukkural (film) =

Indian Tamil language biographical drama film

- Theatrical release poster
- Directed by: A. J. Balakrishnan
- Written by: Sembur K. Jeyaraj
- Starring: Kalai Cholan; Dhana Lakshmi; O. A. K. Sundar; Kottachi Annamagan
- Cinematography: A. M. Edwin Sakay
- Edited by: Vinoth Sivakumar
- Music by: Ilayaraaja
- Production company: Ramana Communications
- Release date: 27 June 2025
- Country: India
- Language: Tamil

Thirukkural is a 2025 Indian Tamil language biographical drama film directed by A.J. Balakrishnan and produced under the banner of Ramana Communications.

== Cast ==
- Kalai Chozhan as Thiruvalluvar
- Danalakshmi as Vasuki
- O. A. K. Sundar as Pandiya King
- Subramaniya Siva as Nakkeerar
- Kottachi as Perundhalai Chathanar
- Guna Babu as Parithi
- Padini Kumar as Pavala Kodi
- Suganya as Maattathi
- Chandru as Sangumaran
- Aravind Aandavar as Kumanan
- Karthi as Nannan
- Mahadev Payyakkal as Chera King
- Haritha Sri

== Production ==
The movie was announced in November 2023. A. J. Balakrishna previously directed Kamaraj, a biopic of Kamarajar. In an interview with the weekly magazine Ananda Vikatan, he mentioned that the movie is not a biopic of Thiruvalluvar but is more about Thirukkural, and the social background during the time of writing the tome.

== Music ==
All the film's songs were written and composed by Ilaiyaraaja.

== Reception ==
Rakesh of Times Now rated the film two out of five stars and wrote, "Overall, 'Thirukkural' - praise for the effort!". A Dina Thanthi critic wrote, "Director A.J. Balakrishnan has placed the Thiruvalluvar era before our eyes and has incorporated various aspects including love and conflict into it to make it enjoyable".
