= Thalaivasal Vijay =

Indian actor

- Thalaivasal Vijay
- Born: A. R. Vijayakumar; 4 August 1962 (age 64); Kanyakumari, Madras State (now Tamil Nadu), India
- Occupation: Actor
- Years active: 1992–present
- Children: 2

Thalaivasal Vijay (born A. R. Vijayakumar) is an Indian actor and dubbing artist. He has acted predominantly in Tamil and Malayalam films. He also acted a few Telugu, and Hindi films.

== Career ==
Vijay's debut film was Thalaivaasal (1992), which became part of his stage name in Tamil cinema following acclaim for his performance. Other notable performances include Thevar Magan (1992) and Mahanadhi (1994). Vijay has performed in Tamil, Malayalam, Telugu, and Hindi films. He has worked as a dubbing artist for actors in other languages and has featured in numerous television serials.

He is noted for his character roles, especially in R. Sukumaran's 2010 Malayalam film Yugapurushan as Narayana Guru. The actor is usually seen in negative and supporting roles. Vijay, in his career spanning over 30 years, has appeared in more than 280 films.

== Personal life ==
His children, AV Jayaveena and Jaywant Vijayakumar, used to be professional swimmers.

== Filmography ==
=== Tamil ===
==== 1990s ====
| Year | Title | Role | Notes |
|---|---|---|---|
| 1992 | Sivantha Malar | | |
| 1992 | Thalaivaasal | Babu | |
| 1992 | Thevar Magan | Muthuvel | |
| 1993 | Amaravathi | Dr. Charlie | |
| 1993 | Thanga Pappa | Ravi | |
| 1993 | Maamiyar Veedu | Inspector Vijay | |
| 1993 | Thiruda Thiruda | CBI Officer | |
| 1994 | Mahanadhi | Mannangkatti | |
| 1994 | Veettai Paaru Naattai Paaru | Sakthi | |
| 1994 | Magalir Mattum | Papamma's husband | |
| 1994 | Adharmam | | |
| 1994 | Chinna Pulla | Subramani | |
| 1994 | Periya Marudhu | Marimuthu | |
| 1995 | Padikkara Vayasula | | |
| 1995 | Gandhi Pirantha Mann | | |
| 1995 | Raasaiyya | Kaalai | |
| 1995 | Vishnu | Rajamanikkam | |
| 1996 | Avathara Purushan | Vaishali's father | |
| 1996 | Kadhal Kottai | Panneer | |
| 1996 | Tamizh Selvan | rebellious group leader | |
| 1996 | Gokulathil Seethai | Pimp | |
| 1997 | Periya Thambi | Sundarapandian | |
| 1997 | Aravindhan | Muthukrishnan | |
| 1997 | Thaali Pudhusu | Seetha’s brother-in-law | |
| 1997 | Devathai | Kamusigha | |
| 1997 | Nandhini | Kannadi Vijay | |
| 1997 | Nerrukku Ner | Police Inspector Venkatram | |
| 1997 | Samrat | Samrat’s father | |
| 1997 | Vasuki | | |
| 1997 | Kadhalukku Mariyadhai | Thomas | |
| 1998 | Kaadhale Nimmadhi | Singer | |
| 1998 | Kizhakkum Merkkum | Ganesan | |
| 1998 | Dhinamdhorum | | Guest appearance |
| 1998 | Velai | | |
| 1998 | Color Kanavugal | | |
| 1998 | Bhagavath Singh | | |
| 1998 | Santhosham | Kanthaswamy | |
| 1998 | Harichandra | Raghu | |
| 1998 | Dharma | Vijay | |
| 1998 | Poonthottam | | |
| 1998 | Guru Paarvai | Kaali / Vijay | |
| 1998 | Simmarasi | Lakhsmi's husband | |
| 1998 | Kaadhal Kavithai | Pandiyan | |
| 1999 | Adutha Kattam | | |
| 1999 | En Swasa Kaatre | | |
| 1999 | Rajasthan | One of the terrorists | |
| 1999 | Annan Thangachi | Chitti | |
| 1999 | Amarkkalam | | |
| 1999 | Kannodu Kanbathellam | DCP Bharathi | |
| 1999 | Mugam | | |
| 1999 | Iraniyan | | |

==== 2000s ====
| Year | Title | Role | Notes |
|---|---|---|---|
| 2000 | Kannukkul Nilavu | Shanmugam | |
| 2000 | Sudhandhiram | Divya's father | |
| 2000 | Sandhitha Velai | Vasu | |
| 2000 | Vallarasu | Terrorist | |
| 2000 | James Pandu | Manager | |
| 2000 | Magalirkkaga | Nagaraj I.P.S | |
| 2000 | Ennamma Kannu | | |
| 2000 | Chinna Chinna Kannile | Dev | |
| 2000 | Sabhash | Police inspector | |
| 2000 | Karuvelam Pookkal | Teacher | |
| 2000 | Ilayavan | | |
| 2000 | Priyamaanavale | Selva | |
| 2000 | Seenu | Seenu's uncle | |
| 2000 | Ennavalle | Neighbour | |
| 2001 | Vaanchinathan | | |
| 2001 | Narasimha | Police | |
| 2001 | Maayan | Freedom fighter | |
| 2001 | Veettoda Mappillai | Muthupandi | |
| 2001 | Mitta Miraasu | | |
| 2001 | Kasi | Sevvalai | |
| 2001 | Paarthale Paravasam | | |
| 2001 | Aandan Adimai | | |
| 2002 | Red | Ananda Vikatan Reporter | |
| 2002 | Thamizh | Haneefa | |
| 2002 | Unnai Ninaithu | Nirmala's father | |
| 2002 | Thulluvadho Ilamai | Mahesh's father | |
| 2002 | Devan | Jeeva | |
| 2002 | Nettru Varai Nee Yaaro | | |
| 2002 | Shree | Shree’s henchmen | |
| 2002 | Ivan | Father of Jeevan | |
| 2002 | Bagavathi | Ganga | |
| 2002 | Mutham | | |
| 2002 | Naina | | |
| 2002 | Karmegham | District Collector | |
| 2002 | Maaran | Doctor Prakash | |
| 2002 | Bala | Om Prakash | |
| 2002 | Kadhal Virus | Himself | |
| 2003 | Kalatpadai | Deenadayalan | |
| 2003 | Student Number 1 | Advocate | |
| 2003 | Anbe Anbe | Cheenu's father | |
| 2003 | Inidhu Inidhu Kadhal Inidhu | | |
| 2003 | Thennavan | Mustafa | |
| 2003 | Kaiyodu Kai | Vijayakumar | |
| 2003 | Anjaneya | Government Employee | |
| 2003 | Jay Jay | Jamuna's father | |
| 2003 | Indru | Superior Officer | |
| 2003 | Kadhal Kirukkan | Lawyer | |
| 2004 | Varnajalam | Devanathan's brother | |
| 2004 | Vaanam Vasappadum | Opposition Lawyer | |
| 2004 | Nee Mattum | | |
| 2004 | Arul | Thirukumarann | |
| 2004 | Perazhagan | Shenbagam's brother | |
| 2004 | Vasool Raja MBBS | Doctor | |
| 2004 | Bose | Bose's brother | |
| 2004 | Dreams | Mahendran | |
| 2004 | Aai | Police | |
| 2004 | Udhaya | Police | |
| 2005 | Aayudham | | |
| 2005 | Devathayai Kanden | Bhoopathy | |
| 2005 | Sachein | Preethi's father | |
| 2005 | Anda Naal Nyabagam | | |
| 2005 | Oru Kalluriyin Kathai | Taxi driver | |
| 2005 | Ponniyin Selvan | Drawing artist | |
| 2005 | Aanai | | |
| 2005 | Sandakozhi | Kasi's friend | |
| 2005 | Adhu Oru Kana Kaalam | | |
| 2005 | Devathaiyai Kanden | Uma's advocate | |
| 2005 | Kannadi Pookal | Vasudevan's lawyer | |
| 2005 | Ponniyin Selvan | Drawing artist | |
| 2006 | Madrasi | Police inspector | |
| 2006 | Sudesi | Professor | |
| 2006 | Parijatham | Muthu | |
| 2006 | 47A Besant Nagar Varai | | |
| 2006 | Sasanam | | |
| 2006 | Vathiyar | School Teacher | |
| 2006 | Kurukshetram | Westerner | |
| 2006 | Nenjil | Krishnamurthy | |
| 2006 | Nenjirukkum Varai | Ganesh's father | |
| 2006 | Aadum Koothu | | |
| 2007 | Achacho | Periyasamy | |
| 2007 | Nalvaravu | | |
| 2007 | Ninaithu Ninaithu Parthen | | |
| 2007 | Aarya | Collector | |
| 2008 | Bheemaa | Saamy | |
| 2008 | Nenjathai Killadhe | Anandhi's father | |
| 2008 | Thotta | | |
| 2008 | Inba | Rangan | |
| 2008 | Singakutty | DGP | |
| 2008 | Arai En 305-il Kadavul | Rafeeq | |
| 2008 | Uliyin Osai | Manikandan | |
| 2008 | Thithikkum Ilamai | | |
| 2008 | Jayamkondaan | Poongodhai's father | |
| 2008 | Ellam Avan Seyal | Chandrashekar | |
| 2008 | Pathu Pathu | Subbu | |
| 2008 | Kathi Kappal | Elangovan | |
| 2008 | Abhiyum Naanum | Mohan | |
| 2008 | Sadhu Miranda | Doctor Janakiraman | Guest appearance |
| 2009 | Kadhal Meipada | Vishva | |
| 2009 | Thee | Rathnam | |
| 2009 | Mariyadhai | Muthaiyya | |
| 2009 | Newtonin Moondram Vidhi | Inspector | |
| 2009 | Kulir 100° | School Principal | |
| 2009 | Vaamanan | Kailasam | |
| 2009 | Aarumaname | Samikannu | |
| 2009 | Vaigai | Manikkam | |
| 2009 | Oru Kadhalan Oru Kadhali | | |
| 2009 | Naalai Namadhe | | Guest appearance |

==== 2010s ====
| Year | Title | Role | Notes |
|---|---|---|---|
| 2010 | Thambikku Indha Ooru | Thamizhmani | |
| 2010 | Pen Singam | | |
| 2010 | Siddhu +2 | | Guest appearance |
| 2010 | Kaila Kaasu Vaaila Dhosa | | |
| 2010 | Jayamundu Bayamillai | | |
| 2011 | Payanam | Col. Jagadeesh | |
| 2011 | Aayiram Vilakku | | |
| 2011 | Marudhavelu | | Special appearance |
| 2012 | Dhoni | Neurosurgeon | |
| 2012 | Kadhal Paathai | | |
| 2012 | Ooh La La La | Surya's father | |
| 2013 | Anil | | |
| 2013 | Thirumathi Thamizh | Vijay | |
| 2013 | Singam II | Sathya's father | |
| 2013 | Puthagam | Vasanth | |
| 2014 | Ninaivil Nindraval | | |
| 2014 | Vetri Selvan | Bashyam | |
| 2014 | Ramanujan | Sathiyapriya Rayar | |
| 2014 | Poojai | Kumaraswamy | |
| 2014 | Vingyani | | |
| 2014 | Nerungi Vaa Muthamidathe | | |
| 2015 | Pulan Visaranai 2 | Advocate | |
| 2015 | Anegan | Moorthy | |
| 2015 | En Vazhi Thani Vazhi | Manimaaran | |
| 2015 | Serndhu Polama | Grandfather | |
| 2015 | Sagaptham | Dinesh | |
| 2015 | Kalai Vendhan | | |
| 2015 | Apoorva Mahaan | Sai Baba | |
| 2015 | Kubera Rasi | | |
| 2016 | Sowkarpettai | Shakthi's / Vetri's father | |
| 2016 | Meendum Oru Kadhal Kadhai | Abdul Rahman | |
| 2016 | Meen Kuzhambum Mann Paanaiyum | Pavithra's father | |
| 2016 | Andaman | | |
| 2016 | Achamindri | Collector | |
| 2017 | Brindavanam | Sandhya's father | |
| 2017 | Vanamagan | Kavya's uncle | |
| 2017 | Sathura Adi 3500 | Perumal | |
| 2017 | Thupparivaalan | Madhavan | |
| 2018 | Keni | Minister | |
| 2018 | Kadal Kuthiraigal | Activist | |
| 2018 | Sei | Minister Rajarathinam | |
| 2018 | Bhaagamathie | Psychiatrist | |
| 2019 | Gilli Bambaram Goli | | |
| 2019 | Neerthirai | Kannan | |
| 2019 | NGK | Saghayam | |
| 2019 | Kaappaan | Santhosh | |
| 2019 | 100% Kadhal | Subramani | |

==== 2020s ====
| Year | Title | Role | Notes |
|---|---|---|---|
| 2020 | Mafia: Chapter 1 | Mugilan | |
| 2021 | Singa Paarvai | Commissioner Thangavel | |
| 2022 | D Block | Principal | |
| 2022 | Yaanai | Jacob | |
| 2022 | Laththi | Ranganathan | |
| 2023 | Kasethan Kadavulada | Saga | |
| 2023 | Priyamudan Priya | | |
| 2024 | Singapore Saloon | Kathir's father | |
| 2024 | DeAr | Shanmugam | |
| 2024 | Romeo | Leela's father | |
| 2024 | Mazhai Pidikkatha Manithan | Raghavan | |
| 2024 | Kadaisi Ulaga Por | Ramakrishnan "Central Ramki" | |
| 2024 | Orea Peachu Orea Mudivu | | |
| 2024 | Once Upon A Time in Madras | Anitha's father | |
| 2025 | Vallan | Minister | |
| 2025 | Enai Sudum Pani | Vijay | |
| 2025 | Jenma Natchathiram | Dr. Seeman | |
| 2025 | 3BHK | Sundar | |
| 2025 | Red Flower | Lucifer | |
| 2025 | Madharaasi | Dr. Kannan | |
| 2025 | Padaiyaanda Maaveeraa | Judge | |
| 2026 | Anantha | Meenakshi's father | |
| 2026 | Fourth Floor | Krishnamoorthy | |
| 2026 | TN 2026 | | |
| 2026 | Charukesi | Senthil | |
| 2026 | DC | Arasu | |

=== Malayalam ===
| Year | Title | Role | Notes |
|---|---|---|---|
| 2000 | Madhuranombarakattu | Kalki Parameswar | |
| 2004 | Kerala House Udan Vilpanakku | Periya Thevar | |
| 2010 | Yugapurushan | Sree Narayana Guru | |
| 2010 | Shikkar | Rowther | |
| 2011 | August 15 | DGP | |
| 2011 | The Filmstaar | Sakhavu Raghavan | |
| 2011 | Teja Bhai & Family | Damodarji | |
| 2011 | Melvilasom | Colonel Surat Singh | |
| 2011 | Snehadaram | | |
| 2012 | Karmayogi | | |
| 2012 | Achante Aanmakkal | | |
| 2012 | Nidra | Madhava Menon (Raju's father) | |
| 2012 | Hero | Dharmarajan Master | |
| 2012 | Silent Valley | | |
| 2012 | Matinee | Najeeb's father | |
| 2012 | The Hitlist | Robert | |
| 2013 | Lokpal | Ramabhadran / PP | |
| 2013 | Celluloid | Mudaliar | |
| 2013 | Breaking News Live | Adv. Surendra Menon | |
| 2013 | Bangles | DYSP Soloman | |
| 2013 | Radio | Doctor | |
| 2013 | Olipporu | | |
| 2013 | North 24 Kaatham | Sreekumar | |
| 2013 | Oru Kudumba Chithram | Shanmukha Vel | |
| 2013 | Pigman | | |
| 2014 | Gamer | Abraham Koshi | |
| 2015 | Lavender | Joseph Tharakan | |
| 2015 | Kanthari | Cameo | |
| 2015 | Oru New Generation Pani | | |
| 2016 | Campus Diary | | |
| 2017 | Vedham | | |
| 2018 | Captain | SP Rajashekaran | |
| 2018 | Kinar | Minister | |
| 2019 | Luca | Jayaram | |
| 2019 | Kunjiramante Kuppayam | Raman | |
| 2022 | Aaraattu | Varadaraja Venkatachalam | |
| 2023 | 1921: Puzha Muthal Puzha Vare | Variyankunnath Kunjahammad Haji | |
| 2023 | Within Seconds | Don | |
| 2023 | Garudan | Colonel Philip George | |
| 2025 | The Protector | | |
| TBA | Price of Police † | TBA | Post Production |

=== Telugu ===
| Year | Film | Role |
|---|---|---|
| 1995 | Stri | Paddalu |
| 2005 | Nayakudu | Vadayar's henchman |
| 2006 | Neeku Naaku | |
| 2008 | Keka | Kiran's father |
| 2010 | Maro Charithra | Swapna's father |
| 2011 | Gaganam | Col. Jagadeesh |
| 2013 | Satya 2 | Prakash Rao |
| 2018 | Bhaagamathie | Psychiatrist |
| 2019 | Yatra | Tulla Devender Goud |
| 2020 | V | Ramanujan |
| 2022 | Radhe Shyam | Scientist |
| 2022 | Aa Ammayi Gurinchi Meeku Cheppali | Dr. James Kutty |
| 2024 | Razakar – Silent Genocide of Hyderabad | K. M. Munshi |

=== Hindi ===
| Year | Film | Role | Notes |
|---|---|---|---|
| 2019 | Junglee | Dipankar Nair | Uncredited |
| 2021 | Bell Bottom | P. V. Narasimha Rao | |
| 2022 | Radhe Shyam | scientist | |

=== English ===
| Year | Film | Role |
|---|---|---|
| 2004 | Morning Raga | Swarnalata's husband |

=== As voice over artist ===
| Year | Film | For Whom | Character |
|---|---|---|---|
| 1997 | Ullaasam | Devan | |
| 1998 | Uyire | Aditya Srivastava | |
| 1999 | House Full | Surya (Telugu actor) | Police commissioner |
| 1999 | Mudhalvan | Surya (Telugu actor) | Pugazhendhi's bodyguard |
| 2000 | Pandavas: The Five Warriors | | Shakuni |
| 2001 | Pandavar Bhoomi | Mukesh Tiwari | |
| 2002 | Kannathil Muthamittal | J. D. Chakravarthy | |
| 2002 | Gemini | Murali | |
| 2002 | Baba | Sayaji Shinde | |
| 2003 | Magic Magic 3D | Tirlok Malik | Krishna |
| 2003 | Nala Damayanthi | Bruno Xavier | Ivan |
| 2003 | Arasu | Murali | |
| 2005 | Ghajini | Pradeep Rawat | |
| 2009 | Vettaikaaran | Srihari | Devaraj |
| 2012 | Vettai | Ashutosh Rana | Annaachi |
| 2013 | Aarambam | Atul Kulkarni | |
| 2014 | Jilla | Pradeep Rawat | |
| 2017 | Kadamban | Deepraj Rana | |
| 2018 | Adanga Maru | Babu Antony | |
| 2022 | Ponniyin Selvan: I | Babu Antony | Khottiga |
| 2023 | Ponniyin Selvan: II | Babu Antony | Khottiga |

== Television ==
=== Tamil ===
| Title | Role | Channel |
|---|---|---|
| Akashaya | | Sun TV |
| Aalavandhan Kolai Vazhakku | | |
| Ganga Yamuna Saraswati | | Raj TV |
| Vidiyal Pudithu | | Raj TV |
| Micro Thodargal - Othigai | | Raj TV |
| Aaya | Vadivamma's husband | DD Podhigai |
| Azhagu | Palaniswamy | Sun TV |
| Fall | Dhivya's father | Disney+ Hotstar |
| The Village | Jagan | Amazon Prime Video |
| Resort | Nedumaran | JioHotstar |

=== Malayalam ===
| Title | Channel |
|---|---|
| Neelamala | DD Malayalam |
| Gopika | DD Malayalam |
| Padavukal | DD Malayalam |
| Anandharagam | Surya TV |

== Awards ==
| Year | Title | Awards |
|---|---|---|
| 2010 | Special Jury Award - Yugapurushan | Kerala State Film Awards |
| 2012 | Best Actor in a Supporting Role for Karmayogi | 1st South Indian International Movie Awards |
| 2018 | Azhagu | Sun Kudumbam Viruthugal for Best Father |
