= Aasaiyil Oru Kaditham =

- DVD cover
- Directed by: Selvaa
- Screenplay by: Selvaa
- Based on: Snehithulu (1998) by Muthyala Subbaiah
- Produced by: V. Ramesh
- Starring: Prashanth; Kausalya; Anand; Chandini
- Cinematography: K. S. Selvaraj
- Edited by: Venkateswara Rao
- Music by: Deva
- Production company: Udhaya Arts
- Release date: 17 December 1999
- Running time: 133 minutes
- Country: India
- Language: Tamil

Aasaiyil Oru Kaditham (transl. A Letter With Love) is a 1999 Indian Tamil-language romantic drama film directed by Selvaa. The film stars Prashanth, Kausalya, Anand, and Chandni alongside an ensemble supporting cast including Vivek, Vijayakumar, Sathyapriya, Rajan P. Dev, and Santhana Bharathi. It is a remake of the Telugu film Snehithulu (1998). The music was composed by Deva with cinematography by K. S. Selvaraj and editing by Venkateswara Rao. The film was released on 17 December 1999.

== Plot ==
Karthik is on his way from Chennai to attend his friend Anand's wedding in a village. In the bus stand, Karthik sees a girl and gets attracted towards her. To his surprise, he meets the same girl in the village again. Karthik writes a love letter to her and gives it through a small girl. Karthik gets shocked now as he finds that the girl is Lakshmi and is also Anand's fiancé.

Lakshmi's relatives get furious upon knowing that someone has given a love letter to her, and they keep searching for the guy who has written it. Once the wedding is complete, Karthik reveals to everyone that it was him who had given the love letter to Lakshmi and apologises that he did not know that Lakshmi is the bride in the wedding. Lakshmi's relatives forgive him, while Anand and Lakshmi leave to Chennai.

However, Anand gets suspicious that Lakshmi might have an affair with Karthik and starts suspecting her. He also keeps secretly monitoring her while being alone at home. Anand's father is also a sadist, and he tortures Lakshmi. Anand openly reveals to Lakshmi that he does not trust her and accuses of having an illegitimate affair with Karthik. Lakshmi is worried and keeps trying to win the trust of her husband.

Meanwhile, Chandini is Karthik's college mate who loves him, but he does not reciprocate. Despite Karthik avoiding Chandini, she tries to woo him continuously. Finally Karthik accepts Chandini's love, and her father, a local rich man, decides to get them married.

Unfortunately, Anand's suspicion over Lakshmi increases, and he starts torturing her. He even goes to the extent of throwing acid on her face. One day, Lakshmi's cousin comes to meet her, but Anand behaves very rude towards him. Lakshmi requests her cousin not to inform about the torture that she undergoes to her father as he will keep worrying. Lakshmi decides to commit suicide and goes to a nearby bridge, but she luckily gets saved by Karthik. Lakshmi reveals about Anand's behaviour to Karthik, and he feels bad that it was him who is responsible for all the fiasco.

Karthik goes to meet Anand and again tries to prove that he does not have an affair with Lakshmi. However, Anand does not listen to him. Anand also decides to spoil Karthik's relationship with Chandini. Anand meets Chandini and informs that Karthik and Lakshmi are in an illegitimate relationship, which shocks Chandini. Chandini's father gets furious upon hearing this, and he sends a few goons to beat Karthik, but Karthik beats them up and comes to meet Chandini. He decides to break up with Chandini as she did not trust him and instead believed all the false stories cooked up by Anand.

Lakshmi could no longer bear her husband's torture and decides to return to her parents. Karthik meets Lakshmi and decides to accompany during her travel until the village. However, Anand informs Lakshmi's father that Lakshmi has decided to elope with Karthik. Lakshmi's father also believes Anand's words and accuses Lakshmi and Karthik when they reach the village.

Lakshmi worries that even her parents did not trust her. Anand and his father come to Lakshmi's village and try to tarnish her image in front of the villagers. However, Lakshmi's cousin (who met Lakshmi at her home before) comes to the spot and clarifies about the hardships that she had faced. Lakshmi's father realises his mistake and apologises to her. Meanwhile, Lakshmi decides to ditch Anand and throws the "thali" on his face. She also does not want to stay with her parents as they too doubted her character. Lakshmi decides to walk away from the village, while Karthik says that he will accompany her as a good friend. The film ends with both Karthik and Lakshmi leaving the village together as good friends.

== Cast ==
- Prashanth as Karthik
- Kausalya as Lakshmi (Voice dubbed by Jayageetha)
- Anand as Anand
- Chandini as Chandini (Voice dubbed by Priya)
- Vijayakumar as Lakshmi's father
- Rajan P. Dev as Anand's father
- Vivek as Ramalingam, Karthik's friend
- Charle as Servant
- Dhamu as Sundaralingam, Karthik's friend
- Vaiyapuri as Jambulingam, Karthik's friend
- K. S. G. Venkatesh
- Santhana Bharathi as Chandini's father
- Thalapathy Dinesh
- Sathyapriya as Lakshmi's mother
- Periya Karuppu Thevar as Villager
- Chelladurai as Villager
- Kovai Senthil as Villager
- Nellai Siva as Villager

== Production ==
The film was announced in October 1998 with Vijay as the hero.

== Soundtrack ==
The soundtrack was composed by Deva.

Song	Singer(s)	Lyrics
"Aasaiyil Or Kaditham	Srinivas	Vairamuthu
"French Classile"	Naveen	K. Subash
"Karthigai"	Malgudi Subha	Vairamuthu
"Nee Irunthal Naan"	Hariharan	Vairamuthu
"Vennilave"	Srinivas, Sujatha	Vairamuthu

== Reception ==
Malini Mannath of Chennai Online wrote, "It is a fairly engaging film, one of the better movies from Selva. Comedy, sentiment and action blend cleverly. The closing scene is commendable, one of those 'different' frames that film-makers these days aim for". K. N. Vijiyan of New Straits Times wrote, "This could have been a better movie with a stronger cast". Aurangazeb of Kalki wrote director Selva's balanced screenplay proved that the story is old but still has life. Dinakaran wrote, "The director of the film has succeeded in treating the subject giving it good scope for entertainment. The weight of the problems, around which the story revolves, has given a helping hand to him".
