= Vijay Jasper =

Indian film actor

- Born: 6 February 1972 (age 54); Chennai, Tamil Nadu, India
- Occupation: Actor
- Years active: 2004-present

Vijay Jasper is an Indian actor, who is known for his negative roles in Tamil cinema.

== Career ==
Jasper was a software engineer before choosing to opt for a career in films. He made his acting debut in Gambeeram (2004) and appeared alongside actor Sarathkumar, who later also recommended him to feature in his next films Chatrapathy and Jithan (2004). He continued portraying supporting antagonistic roles throughout the late 2000s and won acclaim for his role as a gang member in Naanayam (2011), with a critic reporting he "gets noted".

== Filmography ==
=== Tamil films ===
Year	Film	Role	Notes
2004	Gambeeram	Naaga	
2004	Bose	Velumani	
2004	Chatrapathy		
2004	Attagasam	Thoothukudi Fernandez	
2005	Jithan	Dharma	Uncredited role
2005	Anniyan	Henchman	Uncredited role
2005	Aanai		Credited; photo appearance
2006	Thalainagaram	Right's gang member	
2008	Anjathe	Anti Kidnapping Team Member	
2009	Renigunta	Renigunta investigative officer	
2010	Naanayam	Fareed's henchman	
2010	Paiyaa	Goon chasing Charulatha	
2011	Thambikottai	Amirthalingam's assistant	
2011	Kanchana	Muslim Priest	
2013	Vidiyum Munn	Doraisingam	
2014	Oru Kanniyum Moonu Kalavaanikalum		
2014	Burma	Don	
2014	Vingyani		
2015	Massu Engira Masilamani	Ghost	
2015	Puli	Jalatharangan's assistant	
2015	Vedalam	Manimaran's brother	
2016	Sutta Pazham Sudatha Pazham	Thug	
2016	Iru Mugan	Billy Murali	
2025	DNA	Gaja	
2025	Kumaara Sambavam		
2026	Theeyor Koodam		

=== Other language films ===
Year	Film	Role	Language	Notes
2007	Chotta Mumbai	Sebatti	Malayalam	
2011	Amayakudu	Pooja's father	Telugu	
2013	Rajani Kantha	Henchman	Kannada	
2013	Chennai Express	Durgeshwara's henchman	Hindi	
2015	Bengal Tiger		Telugu	
2015	Ragini IPS		Kannada	
2016	Nagarahavu		Kannada	
2019	Vajra Kavachadhara Govinda	Swamy	Telugu	
2020	Laxmii	Muslim Priest	Hindi	
