= Aryan (Tamil actor) =

Indian actor

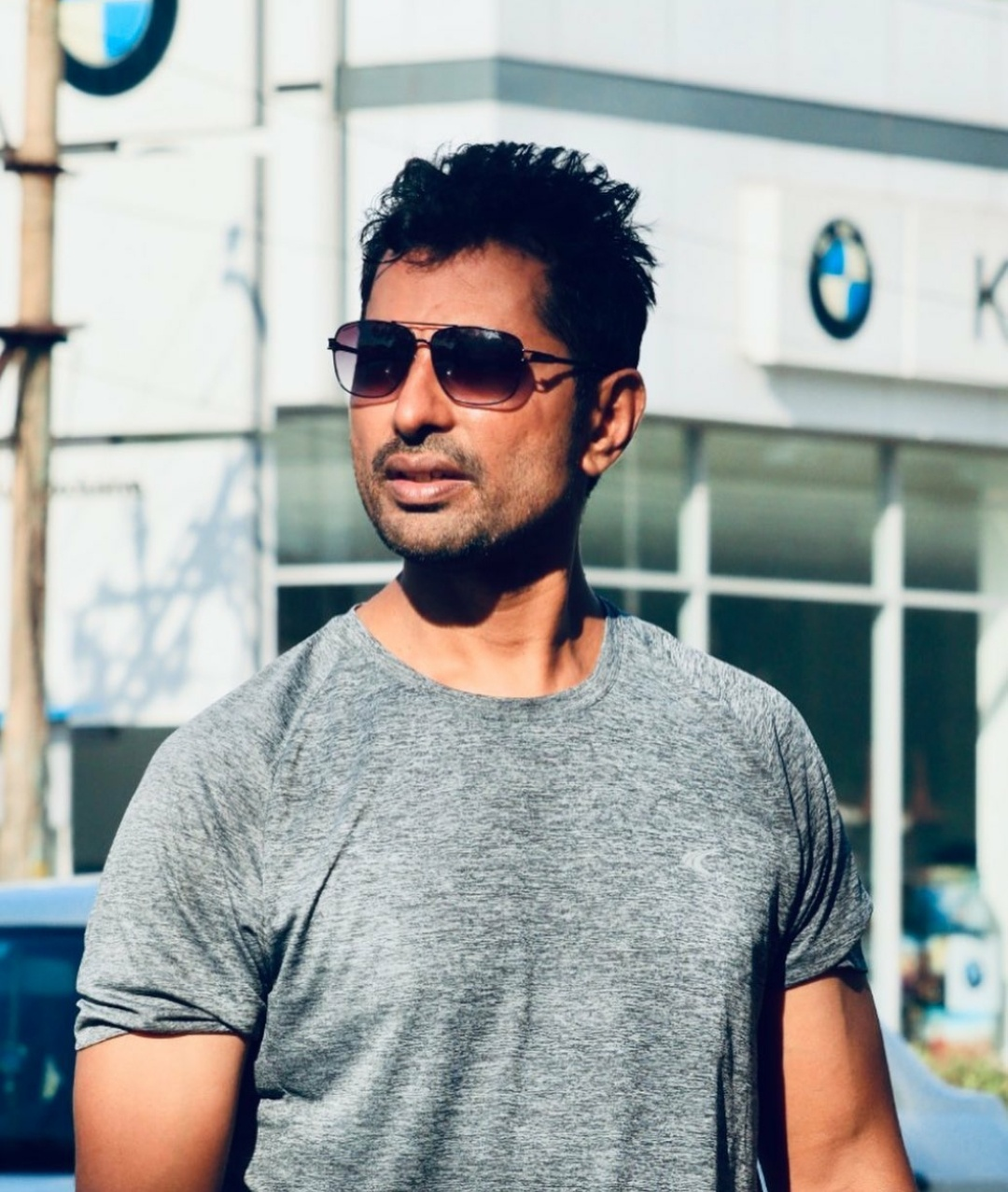
- Born: Aryan Srinivasan; 14 October 1982 (age 43); Vellore, Tamil Nadu, India
- Occupation: Actor
- Years active: 2004–present

Aryan (born 14 October 1982) is an Indian actor who has worked predominantly in the Tamil movie industry.

== Early life and career ==
Between 1995 and 2004, Aryan performed in many stage dramas in Mumbai. He was popularly known as Pan Parag Ravi, his role in Thirupachi (2005) with Vijay.

== Filmography ==
Year	Film	Role	Notes
2004	Giri	Singampuli	
2004	Bose	Wasim's henchman	
2004	Adhu	Sorcerer	
2004	Dreams	Aryan	
2005	Thirupachi	Pan Parag Ravi	
2005	Aanai		
2005	Aaru	Jega	
2006	E		
2007	Manikanda		
2007	Parattai Engira Azhagu Sundaram	Suri	
2007	Aalwar		
2007	Sabari	Ezhumalai	
2008	Nepali		
2009	Thoranai	Tamizharasan's sidekick	
2009	Ainthaam Padai		
2010	Gowravargal		
2010	Kotti		
2011	Bhavani	Ranjith	
2011	Mappillai	Aathi	
2011	Sadhurangam	Jeeva	
2012	Medhai		
2013	Alex Pandian		
2013	Radhan Ganda	Aryan	Kannada film
2015	Vishayam Veliye Theriya Koodaadhu		
2015	Inimey Ippadithaan	Ravi	
2017	Sakka Podu Podu Raja	Ravi	
2018	Padithavudan Kilithu Vidavum		
2019	Vantha Rajavathaan Varuven	ACP	
2019	Pottu	Veeraiah	
2021	Pei Mama	Broker	
2021	IPC 376	Sebastian	
2023	Agilan		Uncredited
2023	Viduthalai Part 1	Constable Aari	
2024	Viduthalai Part 2	Constable Aari	
2025	Flashback		Only the Hindi dubbed version was released.
