= Colour Kanavugal =

- Directed by: Vishva
- Written by: M. S. Kamalesh Kumar
- Produced by: K. R. Kannan
- Starring: Karan; Khushbu
- Music by: Adithyan
- Production company: KRK Movies
- Release date: 6 March 1998
- Running time: 160 minutes
- Country: India
- Language: Tamil

Colour Kanavugal (transl. Colourful dreams) is a 1998 Indian Tamil-language film, written and directed by Vishva. The film stars Karan and Khushbu, with Manivannan and Thalaivasal Vijay in supporting roles. It was released on 6 March 1998.

== Cast ==
- Karan as Bharani
- Khushbu as Pooja
- Manivannan
- Thalaivasal Vijay
- Vennira Aadai Moorthy
- Kazan Khan
- Thideer Kannaiah
- Pandu
- Madhan Bob
- Thyagu
- King Kong
- K. R. Vatsala
- Amarasigamani

== Soundtrack ==
The soundtrack was composed by Adithyan.

Song	Singers	Lyrics
"Gundumalli Pooveduthu"	S. P. Balasubrahmanyam, Swarnalatha	Vairamuthu
"Muthangal Vazhangu"	S. P. Balasubrahmanyam, K. S. Chithra	Vairamuthu
"Malli Malli Malliga"	Suresh Peters	Vaali
"Tax Free"	Annupamaa, Sujatha, Sangeetha Sajith	Vaali
"Chappa Chappa"	Kovai Kamala, Deva	Kalidasan

== Reception ==
D. S. Ramanujam of The Hindu wrote, "An attractive title is made more attractive by the combined efforts of Manivannan, Kushbu and Karan in K.R.K. Movies ``Kalar Kanavugal.″ Strangely, the issue of love is settled by a long sermon the heroine makes in the end after Manivannan's money- making dreams fall apart. If this vital question had been put to the heroine by the hero earlier, all the 160 minutes of sitting through could have been avoided". Two years after release, the producers were given a ₹5 lakh (equivalent to ₹21 lakh or US$21,000 in 2023) subsidy by the Tamil Nadu government along with several other films.
