= Bose (film) =

- DVD cover
- Directed by: Senthil Kumar
- Written by: Senthil Kumar
- Produced by: J. H. Murali
- Starring: Srikanth; Sneha
- Cinematography: S.D. Vijay Milton
- Edited by: V. Jaishankar
- Music by: Songs: Yuvan Shankar Raja; Score: Karthik Raja
- Production company: Shri Mahalakshmi Combine
- Release date: 8 October 2004
- Running time: 165 minutes
- Country: India
- Language: Tamil

Bose is a 2004 Indian Tamil-language action thriller film written and directed by Senthil Kumar. It stars Srikanth and Sneha in the lead roles with Kalabhavan Mani, Nagesh, Thalaivasal Vijay, Manikka Vinayagam, and Kalairani in supporting roles. Production took place in different locations across India, with two songs shot in Kyrgyzstan.

Bose released on 8 October 2004. The film was remade in Kannada in 2009 as Yodha.

== Plot ==
Tamil Nadu state Union Minister Kottaiperumal is kidnapped by terrorists, where they demand their men to be released, but the central government refuses the demand and assigns a NSG commando operation with Captain Bose in the lead. Bose and the commandos successfully rescue Kottaiperumal, but the commandos and terrorists suffers equal losses of their two men in the operation. Due to threats against Kottaiperumal, Bose and his team are deployed to the minister's security. During the Republic day program in New Delhi, Kottaiperumal gets attracted to the program's dancer Charulatha, where he secretly brings her to his room and tries to have sex with her.

Bose enters Kottaiperumal's room due to an uproar where he attacks Kottaiperumal and sends Charulatha out of the house without noticing anyone. Due to the attack, Bose is questioned, but he does not reveal the reason and is court-martialed. Bose returns home and lives with his family, while Kottaiperumal is discharged from the hospital and still suffers from serious injuries due to the attack. Enraged, Kottaiperumal secretly assigns underworld gangsters to kill Bose, but Bose manages to defeat them, which makes Kottaiperumal target Bose's family. While being court-martialed, Bose gathers information regarding terrorists' plans to attack various cities in India using RDX and other deadlier weapons.

Meanwhile, Charulatha learns that Bose is court-martialed due to the incident, where she reveals about Kottaiperumal's misbehavior to Bose's senior officers. A cat-and-mouse-chase ensues, where Bose's father is killed and Bose's family is kidnapped by Kottaiperumal. At the hideout, Bose learns that the kidnap was a planned act by Kottaiperumal to gain sympathy votes in the upcoming elections. Bose gets enraged and captures the terrorists, where he kidnaps and secretly kills Kottaiperumal, while the squad assumes the terrorists for the attack and shoots him to death. After this, Bose is reinstated into the service and also reunites with his family.

== Cast ==
- Srikanth as Captain S. C. Bose, 51 SAG, National Security Guards
- Sneha as Charulatha, Bose's love interest
- Kalabhavan Mani as Union Minister Kottaiperumal
- Nagesh as Bose's grandfather
- Manikka Vinayagam as Gandhiraman, Bose's father
- Thalaivasal Vijay as Bose's brother
- Chitra Lakshmanan as Kottaiperumal's party member
- Manobala as Kottaiperumal's party member
- M. S. Bhaskar as Vedimuthu
- Shanmugarajan as AC
- Kalairani as Bose's mother
- Brinda Das as Bose's sister-in-law
- Shraddha Viswanath as Charulatha's best friend
- Devan as Col. Sharma, Commanding Officer, 51 SAG
- Muthukaalai as Bose's classmate
- Pondy Ravi as Commando
- N. Mathrubootham as Doctor
- Sampath Ram as Police Inspector
- Ponnambalam as Sivamani
- Mahanadi Shankar as Velumani's right hand
- Jasper as Velumani
- Nawab Shah as Wasim
- Kishen Das as Bose's nephew
- Aryan as Wasim's henchman
- Rajendran as Nallathambi (uncredited)

== Production ==
This was the third and last time that Srikanth and Sneha were teamed up – after the successes of April Maadhathil (2002) and Parthiban Kanavu (2003).

To portray the role of commando, Srikanth took 20 days training at Delhi to prepare himself. Some action scenes were picturised on Srikanth, Jasper, and some stuntmen at a factory in Ennore. It took eight days to shoot the scene involving 23 stunt artistes. It was choreographed by stunt master Peter Hein. Srikanth, for the role of a commando, had trained under Major Ravi, who supervised the army scenes. Some of the locations for the film are Chennai, Thalakulam, Bangalore, Delhi, and Kerala. Two of the songs have been picturised in Kyrgyzstan.

== Soundtrack ==
The soundtrack was composed by Yuvan Shankar Raja, while his elder brother Karthik Raja composed the film's background score.

Song	Singer(s)	Duration	Lyricist
"Nijama Nijama"	KK, Shreya Ghoshal	4:07	Na. Muthukumar
"Enna Enna Aachu"	Devan Ekambaram, Mathangi	5:22	Pa. Vijay
"Vaitha Kann"	Madhu Balakrishnan, Srivarthini	4:29	Pa. Vijay
"Doli Doli"	Shalini Singh	4:59	Thamarai
"Bommalaattam"	Karthik, Chitra Sivaraman	4:05	Snehan

== Release ==
Bose did not make it to the screens as scheduled on 9 October (Saturday) due to the last minute financial dispute. The prints left the lab on Sunday morning and made it to the screens in southern districts of Madurai and beyond only for the matinee show. In Chennai and surrounding areas, the film opened with noon shows on Sunday. Nearly ₹5 lakh worth of advertisement was spent for the opening weekend. Trade lost almost ₹40 lakh due to missed opening.

== Critical reception ==
A critic from Sify wrote that the "story is pure balderdash. Perhaps to compensate for the lack of a coherent script, the director tries to pack in as much commercial elements like songs, crass comedy and lots of action into the storyline. The first half is crisp while the latter half drags a bit. Still the high-octane action drama is watchable". Malathi Rangarajan of The Hindu wrote, "The first half just whizzes past. It is the second half that stretches a little and also has scenes ending rather abruptly". G. Ulaganathan of the Deccan Herald wrote, "Though an action film, the director takes care to provide a good mixture of romance, comedy and sentiment".
