= Bhagavath Singh =

- Directed by: A. C. Chandrakumar
- Written by: A. C. Chandrakumar
- Produced by: K Kaliyamurthy
- Starring: Napoleon; Sanghavi
- Cinematography: R. Rajarathnam
- Edited by: B. Lenin; V. T. Vijayan
- Music by: Deva
- Production company: Kavikuyil Cine Arts
- Release date: 20 February 1998
- Country: India
- Language: Tamil

Bhagavath Singh is a 1998 Indian Tamil-language action drama film, written and directed by Chandrakumar. The film stars Napoleon and Sanghavi, while Goundamani and Senthil appear in supporting roles. Music for the film was composed by Deva and the film was released on 20 February 1998.

== Cast ==
- Napoleon as Bhagavath Singh
- Sanghavi as Sarojini
- Sangeetha
- Goundamani
- Senthil
- Vinu Chakravarthy
- Ajay Rathnam
- Nizhalgal Ravi
- Visu
- Thalaivasal Vijay
- Alex
- Mahendran
- Ra. Sankaran

== Production ==
The film marked the second venture of filmmaker Chandrakumar after Sevatha Ponnu (1994), with Napoleon, Sanghavi and Sangeetha brought in to play the lead roles. The film marked Sangeetha's debut, after her first project, Poonjolai was shelved. It was said to be the most expensive film in Napoleon's career to that point.

== Soundtrack ==
The soundtrack was composed by Deva and lyrics written by Kalidasan.

Song	Singers	Length
"Aathukkari Odambu"	Swarnalatha	05:09
"Avan Kangalai"	Swarnalatha	04:59
"Kaiyile Cellular"	Mano, Surekha Kothari	05:13
"Kokila Kokila"	Mano, Krishnaraj, Sushmitha	04:39
"Naadu Namma Naadu"	Deva	04:25

== Release and reception ==
The film was ready for release by November 1997, but was delayed as a result of overcrowding at the box office. D. S. Ramanujam of The Hindu wrote, "Cogency and cohesion now and then are sidelined in the director's narration [...] Cinematography of Rajarathnam is a plus point of the movie where the same cannot be said of Deva's music". Two years after release, the producers were given a ₹5 lakh (equivalent to ₹21 lakh or US$22,000 in 2023) subsidy by the Tamil Nadu government along with several other films. The film failed at box-office.
