= Kausalya (actress) =

Indian actress

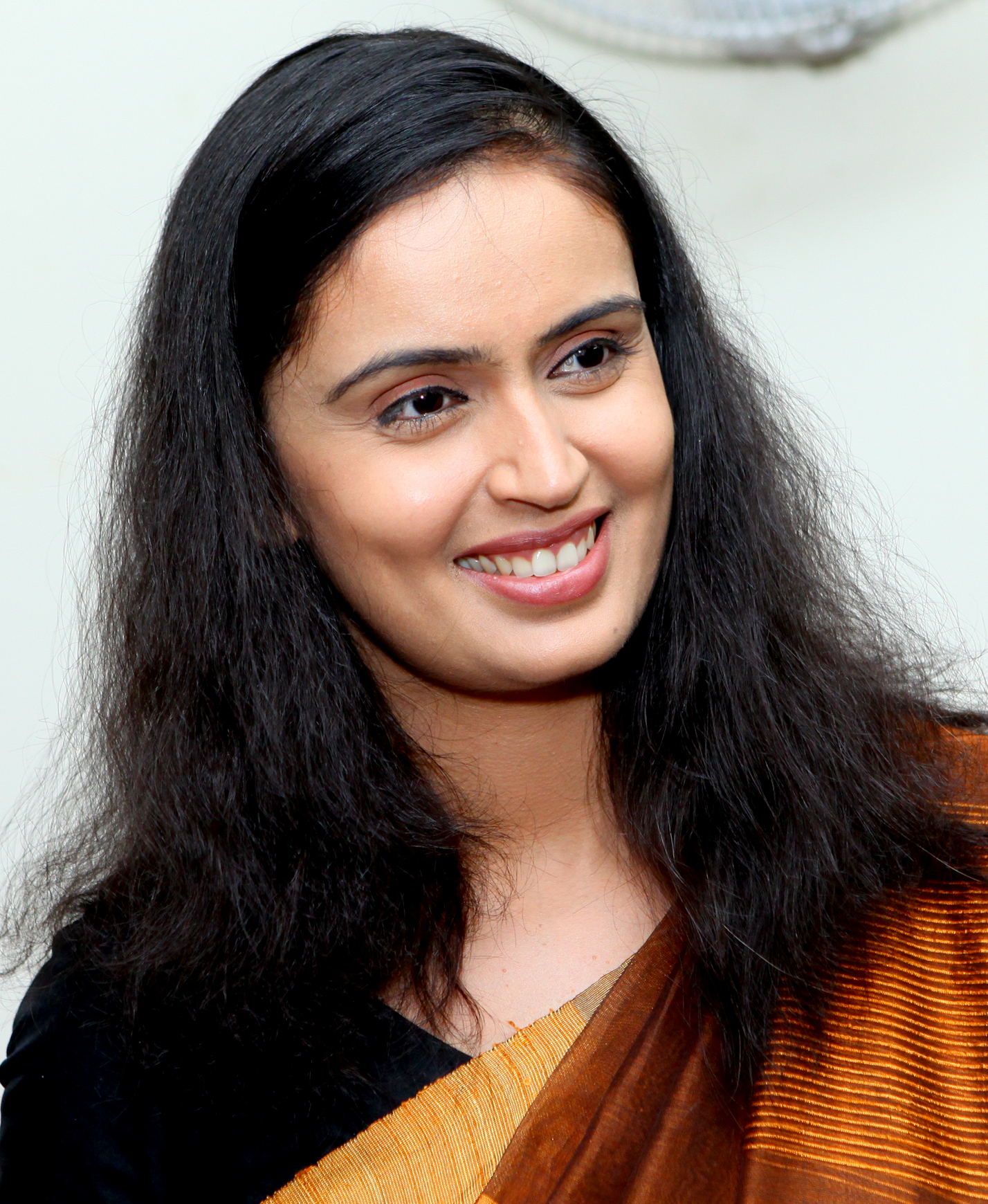
- Kausalya in 2014
- Born: Kavitha Shivshankar; 30 December 1979 (age 46); Bangalore, Karnataka, India
- Other name: Nandini
- Occupations: Actress; model
- Years active: 1996–2010; 2014–present

Kavitha Shivshankar (born: 30 December 1979), commonly known as Kausalya (in Tamil, Telugu and Kannada film industries) or Nandini (in Malayalam film industry), is an Indian actress and model, who has starred mainly in South Indian cinema. After starting her career in leading roles, she has since gone on to portray supporting roles.

== Career ==
Nandini was pursuing a modelling career, before she debuted in the 1996 Malayalam film April 19 by Balachandra Menon. The following year, she appeared in her first Tamil film Kaalamellam Kadhal Vaazhga (1997) with Murali and went on to star in several successful films in Tamil like Nerukku Ner (1997), Priyamudan (1998), Sollamale (1998), Pooveli (1998), Vaanathaippola (2000) and Kutty (2001).

She went on to appear in many Malayalam films including Ayal Kadha Ezhuthukayanu (1998), Karumadikkuttan (2001), Sundara Purushan (2001), Shivam (2002), Udayam (2004), Vajram (2004), Maanikyan (2004) and Sooryan (2007).

She won Filmfare Award for Best Actress – Tamil for her performance in Pooveli. She mostly acted in saree-clad and conservative roles. By the mid-2000s, she turned character artiste and went on to portray supporting roles in films such as Thirumalai (2003) and Santosh Subramaniam (2008) and ventured into television with the series Manaivi which aired 436 episodes on Sun TV.

In 2004, she attempted to make a comeback as a lead actress but unfortunately several of her projects became delayed. Films such as Thiagarajan's Police which starred her alongside Prashanth, Manadhil with Karthik, Vendumadi Nee Enakku and Rosappoo Chinna Rosappoo with Sathyaraj, were readied but then stalled in quick succession.

Kausalya returned to the Tamil industry after 5 years with the action film, Poojai (2014).

She was previously seen playing the role of Sukanya in the popular daily soap Amma, has now joined the cast of another popular show, Sundari.

== Personal life ==
Kausalya was born in Bangalore, Karnataka. Her father Shivashankar Siddalingappa, a Bangalorean, worked as a depot manager at Karnataka State Road Transport Corporation. Her mother is half Marathi and half Kannadiga, and was born and brought up in Sri Lanka. Her grandmother was from Sri Lanka.

== Awards ==
Filmfare Award South

- 1998: Filmfare Award for Best Actress – Tamil – Pooveli

== Filmography ==
=== Films ===
Year	Title	Role	Language	Notes
1996	April 19	Nandhini	Malayalam	
1997	Kaalamellam Kadhal Vaazhga	Kausalya	Tamil	
1997	Nerukku Ner	Akila	Tamil	
1997	Lelam	Gouri Parvathi	Malayalam	
1998	Jolly	Anitha	Tamil	
1998	Priyamudan	Priya	Tamil	
1998	Sollamale	Swetha	Tamil	
1998	Unnudan	Gowri	Tamil	
1998	Pooveli	Maha	Tamil	Filmfare Award for Best Actress – Tamil
1998	Ayal Kadha Ezhuthukayanu	Priyadarshini	Malayalam	
1999	Alludugaaru Vachcharu	Mahalakshmi	Telugu	
1999	Thachiledathu Chundan	Usha	Malayalam	
1999	Panchadara Chilaka	Kalyani	Telugu	
1999	Aasaiyil Oru Kaditham	Lakshmi	Tamil	
2000	Vaanathaippola	Nandini	Tamil	
2000	Eazhaiyin Sirippil	Kausalya	Tamil	
2000	Thai Porandhachu	Geetha	Tamil	
2000	Raja Kaliamman	Meena	Tamil	
2000	Sandhitha Velai	Agalya	Tamil	
2000	James Pandu	Kausalya	Tamil	
2000	Ilaiyavan	Janani	Tamil	
2000	Kuberan	Kavitha	Tamil	
2001	Engalukkum Kaalam Varum	Lakshmi	Tamil	
2001	Thaali Kaatha Kaliamman	Karpagam	Tamil	
2001	Naranathu Thampuran	Hemalatha	Malayalam	
2001	Kunguma Pottu Gounder	Saraswathi	Tamil	
2001	Karumadikuttan	Nandinikutty	Malayalam	
2001	Kutty	Rohini	Tamil	
2001	Sundara Purushan	Sridevi	Malayalam	
2001	Manadhai Thirudivittai	Indhu	Tamil	
2001	Jameendar		Malayalam	
2002	Devan	Jacqueline	Tamil	
2002	Shivam	Dr. Gayathri Bhadran	Malayalam	
2003	Ree Swalpa Barteera	Kausalya	Kannada	
2003	Gandhinagara		Kannada	
2003	Badri	Soni	Kannada	
2003	Thirumalai	Nagalakshmi	Tamil	
2004	Udayam	Anju	Malayalam	
2004	Vajram	Nanda Devarajan	Malayalam	
2004	Gowri	Nagalaxmi	Telugu	
2005	Maanikyan	Nirmala Menon	Malayalam	
2005	Mahanandi	Mrs. Swami	Telugu	
2007	Sooryan	Raji	Malayalam	
2007	Viyyalavari Kayyalu	Bhoopati Rayudu's wife	Telugu	
2008	Santosh Subramaniam	Santosh's sister	Tamil	
2009	Satrumun Kidaitha Thagaval		Tamil	
2009	I G Inspector General	Yamini	Malayalam	
2009	Ghauttham	Geetha	Kannada	
2010	Rambabu Gadi Pellam		Telugu	
2014	Poojai	Susheela	Tamil	
2015	Elinjikkavu PO	Lekshmi	Malayalam	
2016	Anuraga Karikkin Vellam	Anuradha	Malayalam	
2017	Sangili Bungili Kadhava Thorae	Sangili Aandavar's sister	Tamil	
2017	Rarandoi Veduka Chudham	Kaushalya	Telugu	
2017	Brahma.com	Kamu's mother	Tamil	
2018	Koottali	Lakshmi	Tamil	
2018	Jayamahal	Queen Matangi	Kannada	
2018	Echcharikkai	Jaanu	Tamil	
2018	Mandharam	Lakshmi, Rajesh's mother	Malayalam	
2018	Savyasachi	Mahalakshmi	Telugu	
2019	4 Letters	Anjali's mother	Telugu	
2019	Natpe Thunai	Prabhakaran's mother	Tamil	
2019	Khyla	Mithra	Tamil	
2021	Michaelpatty Raja	Laila's real mother	Tamil	
2021	Engada Iruthinga Ivvalavu Naala	Sanjay's mother	Tamil	
2021	Rang De	Arjun's mother	Telugu	
2021	Uthra	Devi	Tamil	
2022	Hero	Subbu's mother	Telugu	
2022	Radha Krishna		Tamil	
2023	Saandrithazh		Tamil	
2024	Purushothamudu	Rachit's mother	Telugu	
2025	Kiss	Lily	Tamil	
2026	Manithan Deivamagalam		Tamil	

=== Television ===
Year	Title	Role	Network	Language	Ref
2004-2006	Manaivi	Hamsaveni / Krishnaveni	Sun TV	Tamil	
2004	Chitta	Hema / Thattha	Surya TV	Malayalam	
2005	Thanichu	Devapriya Raman IAS / Devutty	Asianet	Malayalam	
2008	Kanden Seethaiyai		STAR Vijay	Tamil	
2010	Dharmayudham	Bhairavi	Mega TV	Tamil	
2010	Alaipayuthey	Kannamma	Jaya TV	Tamil	
2014–2015	Akka	Manimekhalai	Jaya TV	Tamil	
2015	Spandhanam	Annie	Surya TV	Malayalam	
2016–2017	Amma	Sukanya	Suvarna TV	Kannada	
2020	Chadarangam	Bhavani	ZEE5	Telugu	
2022; 2024	Sundari	Nandan Bharathi (Extended Cameo Appearance)	Sun TV	Tamil	
2025	Karthigai Deepam	Kausalya IPS (Cameo Appearance)	Zee Tamil	Tamil	
2026	Anandha Ragam	Dr. Gayathri (Cameo Appearance)	Sun TV	Tamil	
2026	Vaagai Sooda Vaa	Sakunthala Devi (Cameo Appearance)	Zee Tamil	Tamil	
