= O. A. K. Sundar =

Indian actor

- Born: Sundar; 3 January 1970 (age 56); Madurai, Tamil Nadu, India
- Occupation: Actor
- Height: 1.86 m (6 ft 1 in)
- Spouse(s): Loganayaki (m.2006-present)
- Children: 1
- Parent: O. A. K. Thevar

O. A. K. Sundar (born 3 January 1970) is an Indian actor who mainly works in Tamil cinema and television. He is known for his antagonistic roles starting with Virumaandi. He played the main character in the television series, Romapuri Pandian and the role of Bhisma in Mahabharatam. He is the son of Indian actor O. A. K. Thevar, who also appeared in negative roles in several films.

== Career ==
O. A. K. Sundar made his film debut with Nadodi Pattukkaran (1992). He played supporting roles in several films including Virumaandi (2004) and Naan Avanillai (2007). Regarding his performance in Nellu (2010), a critic noted that "Veteran actor OAK Sunder gets a full fledged role and plays it to the hilt". He garnered acclaim for his portrayal of Bheeshma in the television serial Mahabharatam. After working on several television series, he stopped working on them to concentrate on films. He has since portrayed negative characters in several films including Kidaari (2016), Saamy Square (2018), and Rocky: The Revenge (2019).

== Personal life ==
He is the son of actor O. A. K. Thevar, who acted as a villain in several films. In 2006, he married Loganayaki.

While shooting for Vaadaa (2010) in Rishikesh, he was caught by the Indian Army since he looked like Osama bin Laden in his getup.

== Filmography ==
=== Television ===
Year	Program	Role	Channel	Notes
1997-99	Mangai		Sun TV	
1999-00	Kokila Enge Pogiral		Sun TV	
2001	Marmadesam - Sorna Regai	Smuggler	Raj TV	
2002-03	Agal Vilakkugal		Sun TV	
2006-07	Roja	Kesavan	Jaya TV	
2006-08	Anjali	Jeeva	Shakti TV	
2006	My Dear Bootham	Mugamboo	Sun TV	
2007-08	Kadhalikka Neramillai	Murugavel	Vijay TV	
2009-	Dhayam		Kalaignar TV	
2012-17	Bhairavi Aavigalukku Priyamanaval	Maya Asura	Sun TV	
2012-14	Pillai Nila	Thangadurai	Sun TV	
2012-14	Merku Mambalathil Oru Kaadhal		Zee Tamil	
2013-16	Mahabharatam	Bhisma	Sun TV	
2014	Bommalattam	Murugesan	Sun TV	Cameo Appearance
2014-16	Romapuri Pandian	Karikalan	Kalaignar TV	Main character
2021	Velammal		Vijay TV	
2024-present	Chinna Marumagal	Rajangam	Vijay TV	

=== Tamil films ===
Year	Film	Role	Notes
1992	Nadodi Pattukkaran	Chinna Pandi	
1993	Senthoorapandi	Meena's suitor	
1994	Pondattiye Deivam		
1995	Deva	Village Man	
1995	Ragasiya Police		
1999	Mudhal Etcharikkai		
2000	Kadhal Rojave	Henchman	
2004	Virumaandi	Kottaisamy	
2004	Jore	Police inspector	
2004	Uyirosai		
2004	Kadhale Jayam		
2004	M. Kumaran S/O Mahalakshmi	Kumaran's coach	
2004	Kadhale Engal Desiya Geetham		
2005	Dancer	Police Inspector	
2005	Ayya	MLA	
2005	Iyer IPS	Gajapathy	
2005	Thotti Jaya		
2005	Aanai	Police Officer	
2006	Madrasi	Kaasi's father	
2006	Unakkum Enakkum	Muthupandi and Kavitha's father	
2006	Perarasu	Inspector Shenbagamoorthy	
2007	Manikanda		
2007	Naan Avanillai	Thyagu	
2007	Vel	Veerapandi	
2007	Durai	DC Eswara Pandian	
2008	Indiralohathil Na Azhagappan		
2008	Thotta	Minister's son	
2008	Ini Varum Kaalam	Thamba	
2008	Kuselan	Kuppusamy's assistant	
2009	Munnar	Kathirvel	
2009	Peraanmai	District collector	
2009	Mathiya Chennai		
2010	Thambikku Indha Ooru	Naana	Uncredited role
2010	Maanja Velu	Bank manager	
2010	Pen Singam	Parasuraman	
2010	Vaadaa	Khedar Pandey	
2010	Indrasena		
2010	Mandabam	Police inspector	
2010	Vallakottai	Police Inspector	
2010	Nellu	Village landlord	
2011	Venghai	DCP	
2011	Puli Vesham	Palpandi	
2011	Velayudham	Kaalidas	
2011	Venmani		
2012	Thiruthani	Prakash	
2013	Puthagam	Anand	
2013	Ragalaipuram	Veerapandi	
2014	Thalaivan	Muthukumar	
2014	Poojai	Durga's father	
2014	Meagamann	Benjamin Vas	
2015	Killadi	Police officer	
2015	Achaaram	Police officer	
2015	Pallikoodam Pogamale	School teacher	
2016	Kidaari	Pulikutthi Pandiyan	
2018	Sollividava	Subhendar Ganesan	
2018	Tamizh Padam 2	Wasim Khan	
2018	Saamy Square	Mahendra Pichai	
2018	Silukkuvarupatti Singam	Raghavan	
2019	Viswasam	Kozhimuthu	
2019	Rocky: The Revenge	Paandi	
2021	Laabam		
2021	Raajavamsam	Kulla Pandi	
2022	Yaanai	Ravi's relative uncle	
2022	Viruman	Kuthalam Thevar	
2022	Naan Mirugamaai Maara	Inspector	
2022	Rathasaatchi	Tamil Nadu Chief Minister	
2023	Meippada Sei		
2023	Agilan	Sarangan	
2023	Thalaikkavasamum 4 Nanbargalum	Rajangam	
2023	Por Thozhil	Ramkumar	
2023	Baba Black Sheep		
2023	Raththam	Ajay Menon	
2025	Thirukkural	Pandiya king	
2025	Vallan		
2025	Otha Votu Muthaiya	Saravana Pandiyan	
2025	Thirukkural	Pandiya King	
2025	Theeyavar Kulai Nadunga	Chandrasekhar	
2026	Leader		
2026	Commando Vin Love Story		

=== Kannada films ===
Year	Film	Role
2006	Dattha	
2008	Kaamannana Makkalu	Patela
2012	Bhaktha Shankara	
2018	Prema Baraha	Subhendar Ganesan
