= Vasuke =

- DVD cover
- Directed by: Kasthuri Raja
- Written by: Kasthuri Raja
- Produced by: G. V. Anandan
- Starring: Rajendra Prasad; Urvashi
- Cinematography: A. Venkatesh
- Edited by: Hari–Palani
- Music by: Ilaiyaraaja
- Production company: Anand Movie Land
- Release date: 30 October 1997
- Running time: 140 minutes
- Country: India
- Language: Tamil

Vasuke (or Vasuki; /vɑːsuki/) is a 1997 Indian Tamil-language comedy drama film written and directed by Kasthuri Raja. The film stars Rajendra Prasad and Urvashi. It was released on 30 October 1997.

== Plot ==
Vasuki (Urvashi) lives with her milkman brother Kabali (Janagaraj) and her sister-in-law Pachaiamma (Jayachitra) in a slum. One day, their relative Ramasamy (Visu) comes to their home with a huge amount of money and asks them for a favor.

In the past, Ramasamy's daughter married the wealthy (Thalaivasal Vijay). Ramasamy was supposed to give a large dowry to the miser mother-in-law Parvatham (Latha), but he could not collect the money in time. So after the marriage, Parvatham started to torture his daughter, going so far as killing Ramasamy's pregnant daughter. Parvatham then arranged a second marriage for her son. Ramasamy finally got the money they asked but it was too late.

Ramasamy wants to take revenge on the cruel Parvatham with Vasuki's help. Vasuki and her family accept, Vasuki takes the name of Kodeeswari and they start to act as a rich family in front of Parvatham. Parvatham has a younger son Balu (Rajendra Prasad) and she wants him to marry rich bride, and Kodeeswari seems to be the perfect bride. Kodeeswari and Balu finally get married, thus Kodeeswari and her family turn Parvatham's life into hell on earth. What transpires next forms the rest of the story.

== Cast ==
- Rajendra Prasad as Balu
- Urvashi as Vasuki / Kodeeswari
- Visu as Ramasamy
- Radha Ravi as Pakkiri
- Janagaraj as Kabali
- Malaysia Vasudevan as Balu’s father
- Latha as Parvatham
- Jayachitra as Pachaiamma
- Pandu as Police officer
- Suresh Chakravarthy
- Uthra
- Kiran Moi
- Bayilvan Ranganathan
- Pasi Narayanan
- Thideer Kannaiah
- Periya Karuppu Thevar
- Chaplin Balu as Balu's friend
- Khushbu in a guest appearance
- Ramji in an uncredited role

== Production ==
The production studio Anand Movie Land, which produced the successful Poomani in 1996, had taken up the serious issue of the dowry problem in their new production Vasuke. One of the leading stars in Telugu cinema, Rajendra Prasad signed to play the lead role for the first time in Tamil cinema.

== Soundtrack ==
The soundtrack was composed by Ilaiyaraaja, with lyrics written by Kasthuri Raja.

Song	Singer(s)	Duration
"Muthamma"	Mano, K. S. Chithra	4:36
"Kaadhal Nilavu"	Malaysia Vasudevan, Malgudi Subha	4:54
"Thanga Nilave"	Ilaiyaraaja	5:06
"Veppilai"	Malaysia Vasudevan, K. S. Chithra	5:08
"Adida Sight"	Yuvan Shankar Raja, Premgi Amaren	5:15
"Vamsathukku"	Mano, K. S. Chithra, Arunmozhi	5:33
