= Periya Karuppu Thevar =

Indian character actor and folk singer

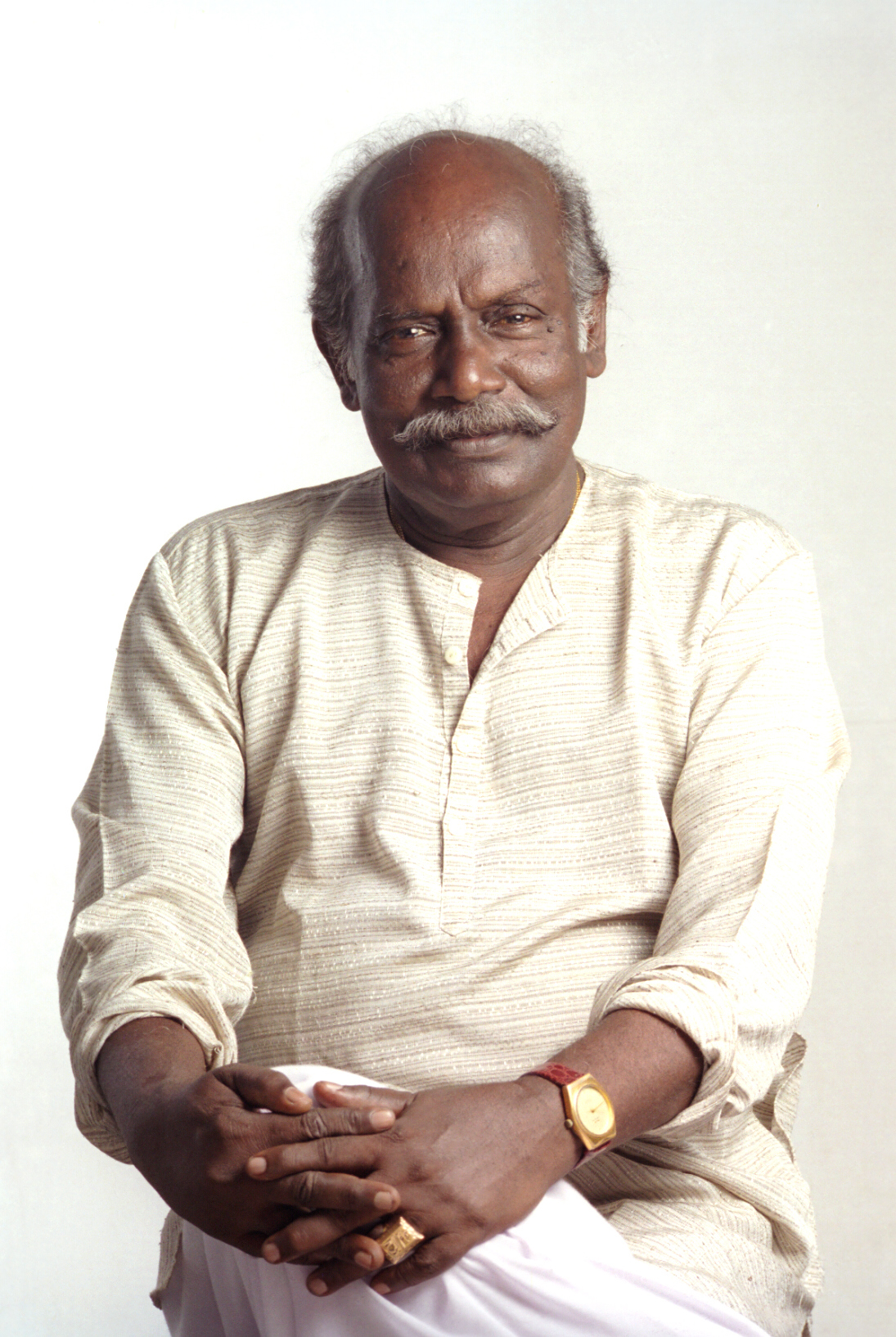
- Born: Periya Karuppu; 1936; Karumathur, Madurai District
- Died: 18 September 2012 (aged 75); Chennai, India
- Occupation: Actor
- Years active: 53
- Spouse: Annamayil
- Children: 4

Periya Karuppu (1936 – 18 September 2012) was an Indian character artiste and folk singer who appeared in Tamil-language films.

== Film career ==
PKT was part of the drama troupe floated by veteran Sankaradoss Swamigal more than fifty years ago. Like many actors of his era, he had made the grade to films as an actor after toiling hard on stage where he used to be quite popular for his acting as well as in singing many folk songs.

His film career has spanned many decades in which he had starred in more than 200 films including a memorable role in Bharathiraaja's Mann Vasanai and in Gangai Amaren's Karagattakkaran which had memorable songs by Ilaiyaraaja. PKT has also sung a festival song in Kamal Haasan's Virumandi a few years back.

He has four sons. One of his sons Virumandi, a director made his directorial debut with Ka Pae Ranasingam (2020).

== Partial filmography ==
=== Actor ===
Year	Film	Role	Notes
1981	Alaigal Oivathillai		
1987	Ini Oru Sudhanthiram		
1989	Enne Petha Raasa		
1990	Mallu Vetti Minor		
1990	Naanum Indha Ooruthan		
1990	Puthu Paatu		
1990	Sandhana Kaatru		
1991	Manasara Vazhthungalen	Chinna Karuppu Thevar	
1992	Government Mappillai		
1992	Solaiyamma		
1992	Unna Nenachen Pattu Padichen		
1994	Rajakumaran		
1995	Gandhi Pirantha Mann		
1995	Ellame En Rasathan		
1995	Marumagan		
1995	Pasumpon	Accountant	
1995	Muthu Kaalai		
1996	Senathipathi	Meenakshi's father	
1997	Vasuke		
1999	Chinna Durai		
1999	Azhagarsamy		
1999	Aasaiyil Oru Kaditham		
2001	Nageswari		
2004	Virumaandi		
2005	Chandramukhi	Locksmith	
2005	Aanai		
2006	Dharmapuri	Villager	
2006	Veyil		
2007	Manikanda		
2007	Koodal Nagar		
2007	Puli Varudhu		
2008	Kanchivaram	Mahadevan's father	
2008	Poo		
2009	Thoranai	Panchayat Man	
2009	Mathiya Chennai		
2010	Goa	Village Elder	
2011	Aadukalam	Ayub	
2012	Murattu Kaalai	Saroja's Grandfather	

=== Singer ===
Year	Film	Song	Notes
2008	Poo	Sivakasi Rathiye	
2009	Vedappan	Vandhuputtom Salangai	

== Death ==
He died on 10 September 2012 and was survived by his four sons. He had suffered a massive cardiac arrest at his Saligramam residence and died in hospital.
