= All Rounder (1998 film) =

- DVD cover
- Directed by: T. Prabhakar
- Written by: Nadiminti Narasimha Rao (dialogues)
- Screenplay by: K. L. Prasad
- Story by: T. Prabhakar; Satya Prasad
- Produced by: Nimmagadda Venkateswara Rao; Palli Kesava Rao; Mandava Suresh
- Starring: Rajendra Prasad; Sanghavi
- Cinematography: Vijay C. Kumar
- Edited by: B. R.
- Music by: Veena Paani
- Production company: Surya Teja Movie Makers
- Release date: 27 March 1998
- Running time: 127 mins
- Country: India
- Language: Telugu

All Rounder is a 1998 Telugu-language comedy film directed by T. Prabhakar. It stars Rajendra Prasad, Sanghavi and music composed by Veena Paani. The film was recorded as a flop at the box office.

== Cast ==
- Rajendra Prasad as Balaraju
- Sanghavi as Ramya
- Brahmanandam as Anaconda
- Babu Mohan as Head constable Engine Oil Anjineelu
- Rami Reddy as S.I. Appa Rao
- Jaya Prakash Reddy as J.P.
- Raghunatha Reddy as Bapineedu
- Rajendra Babu as Chandram
- Ashok Kumar as Sweet Shop Owner
- Bandla Ganesh as Pilla Pilasa
- Ratna Sagar as Balaraju's grandma
- Madhurisen as Anjineelu's sister
- Sivannarayana Naripeddi as Hindi-speaking watchman
- Raksha as Item number

== Soundtrack ==
All Rounder

Film score by Veena Paani
- Released: 1998
- Genre: Soundtrack
- Length: 24:39
- Label: Supreme Music
- Producer: Veena Paani

The score was composed by Veena Paani. The soundtrack album was released by Supreme Music Company.

All Rounder track listing
No.	Title	Lyrics	Singer(s)	Length
1.	"All Rounder"	Sirivennela Sitarama Sastry	S. P. Balasubrahmanyam	4:54
2.	"Bhali Raa Bhali Raa"	Sai Sriharsha	S. P. Balasubrahmanyam	4:48
3.	"Yeppudeppudo"	Samavedam Shanmukha Sarma	Rajesh, Anuradha Sriram	4:55
4.	"Golconda Chowrastra"	Polisetti	Mano, Swarnalatha	4:54
5.	"Attaru Saayibo Raara"	Polisetti	Pranav Kumar	5:08
Total length:				24:39
