= Pooveli =

1998 film directed by Selva

- Poster
- Directed by: Selvaa
- Written by: Murthy Ramesh; Nagulan Ponnusamy (dialogues)
- Screenplay by: Selvaa
- Story by: Selvaa
- Produced by: Rajam Balachander; Pushpa Kandaswamy
- Starring: Karthik; Abbas; Kausalya; Heera
- Cinematography: R. Raghunatha Reddy
- Edited by: Suresh Urs
- Music by: Bharadwaj
- Production company: Kavithalayaa Productions
- Release date: 4 December 1998
- Running time: 144 minutes
- Country: India
- Language: Tamil

Pooveli (/puːveɪlɪ/ transl. Floral fence) is a 1998 Indian Tamil-language romantic drama film directed and co-written by Selvaa. An unofficial remake (with an Indian twist) of A Walk in the Clouds (1995), the film stars Karthik, Abbas, Kausalya and Heera Rajagopal.

Pooveli was released on 4 December 1998. It was remade in Telugu as Alludugaaru Vachcharu (1999) with Kausalya, Abbas and Heera reprising their roles.

== Plot ==
The film opens with the main characters revealing their thoughts on love. Maha feels one must love before the wedding while Shalini feels love is for after the wedding. Maha's father is totally opposed to love and feels it is a way in which children cheat their parents while Murali is totally for it.

Murali follows Shalini around expressing his love for her. But when she insults his love, he promises he wouldn't trouble her again and that one day, she would understand him and come to him. He runs into Maha, his classmate at school, who has recently lost her lover in an accident. To force her father to accept her love, she had already told him that she was married. Circumstances force her uncle to think Murali is her husband and they go back to her house in the village.

Their plan is for Murali to earn the displeasure of Maha's family so that he can leave, but his plans backfire and earn him their love and affection. As he continues living there, he starts to like having a family around and also falls in love with Maha. The only black sheep in their family is Anandaraj, who keeps troubling them.

Maha's grandmother finds out the arrangement between her and Murali, but since she likes Murali, plays a trick to get them both married.

Shalini, who has meanwhile developed feelings for Murali, shows up at the village before the wedding, creating doubts in the minds of the other. This leads to some confusion and problems, which are cleared in the climax.

== Cast ==
- Karthik as Murali
- Abbas as Arun
- Kausalya as Mahalakshmi / Maha
- Heera as Shalini
- Radha Ravi as Chidambaram Pillai (Maha's father)
- Manorama as Maha's grandmother
- Nizhalgal Ravi as Chidambaram's brother
- Charle as Chidambaram's brother's brother-in-law
- Anandaraj as Maha's aunty Husband
- Rajasekaran as Arun's father

== Production ==
Abbas, who was in financial crisis during the period but refused to quit acting for alternative employment, successfully approached the producer for acting in the film.

== Soundtrack ==
Music is composed by Bharadwaj, with lyrics written by Vairamuthu. The song "Oru Poo Ezhuthum" is based on Hamsanadam raga.

Song	Singers	Length
"Itharku Peyar"	Sujatha, Hariharan	04:53
"Oru Poo Ezhuthum Kavithai"	P. Unnikrishnan, K. S. Chithra	05:26
"Kathai Solla"	Karthik, Sunanda, Nizhalgal Ravi, Charle, Manorama	05:01
"O Shalini"	S. P. Balasubrahmanyam	05:08
"Muthu Muthu"	Pushpavanam Kuppusamy, Swarnalatha	04:49
"Vaazhkaiye Vazhkai"	Srinivas	03:23
"Itharku Peyar"	Hariharan	04:53
"Nathiyil Saayum"	Bharadwaj, Reshmi	03:34
"Pooveli"	Instrumental	02:24
"Kathai Solla"	Bharadwaj, Sunandha, Manorama, Nizhalgal Ravi, Charle	05:01

== Release and reception ==
Pooveli was released on 4 December 1998. Ji of Kalki wrote it should have got the status of the best film, but because of mixing masala elements, it becomes just a good film. A reviewer from Deccan Herald wrote "Pooveli prompts one to look at the possibility that the life of the city may be excluding us from fuller pastures, possibilities with more life." K. N. Vijiyan of New Straits Times wrote, "This one is different from the boy-meets-rich girl stuff we have been getting. The turn in events in the movie are also quite difficult to predict". D. S. Ramanujam of The Hindu wrote, "A powerful love story, visualised, structured and essayed by the screenplay of seasoned director Selvaa, engages the viewer's mind right through" in the film. Kausalya won the Filmfare Award for Best Actress – Tamil, and Karthik won the Tamil Nadu State Film Award Special Prize for this film and Unnidathil Ennai Koduthen.
