= Sanghavi =

Indian actress

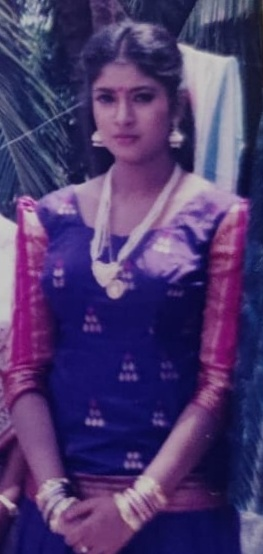
- Sanghavi at Coimbatore Mapillai movie function
- Born: Kavya Ramesh; Mysore, India
- Occupation: Actress
- Years active: 1993–2019, 2026–present
- Spouse: Venkatesh (m. 2016)
- Children: 1

Sanghavi (born Kavya Ramesh) is an Indian former actress and a model known for her work predominantly in Tamil and Telugu films. She was one of the leading actresses in South Indian cinema from 1993 to 2004. In a career spanning 15 years, she has starred in over eighty feature films—38 in Telugu, 35 films in Tamil, eight in Kannada, two in Malayalam and one film in Hindi.

== Early life ==
Sanghavi was born in Mysore, Karnataka. Her father Dr. D. A. Ramesh was an ENT Professor at Mysore Medical College and her mother Ranjana is Kannada film actress Aarathi's elder sister's daughter. Sanghavi studied at Marimallappa High School. In 1993, she made her debut with the Tamil film Amaravathy opposite Ajith Kumar.

== Personal life ==
Sanghavi is an avid dancer and a badminton player. She married Venkatesh, an IT professional, on 3 February 2016 at the Taj Vivanta, Bengaluru. The couple have a daughter named Chanvi who was born in January 2020.

== Accident ==
Sanghavi injured her nose in an accident in 2005 while travelling from Mysore to Chennai. Her father, an ENT professor at the Mysore Medical College, performed corrective surgery. Sanghavi finally returned to the silver screen in 2019 with Kolanji, a film written by Naveen.

== Filmography ==
Year	Film	Role	Language	Notes
1993	Kokkoro Ko		Telugu	
1993	Amaravathy	Amaravathy (Angelin)	Tamil	
1994	Rasigan	Anitha Raghavan	Tamil	
1994	Rayara Maga		Kannada	
1994	Love 94		Kannada	
1994	Nattamai	Kanmani	Tamil	
1994	Galileo		Malayalam	
1995	Kattumarakaran		Tamil	
1995	Muthukulikka Vaariyala	Sundari	Tamil	
1995	Lucky Man	Gopi's lover	Tamil	
1995	Taj Mahal		Telugu	
1995	Ooriki Monagadu		Telugu	
1995	Anbu Magan		Tamil	
1995	Vishnu	Radha	Tamil	
1995	Sindhu Bath	Kannatha	Tamil	
1995	Mannukku Mariyadhai	Bhavani	Tamil	
1995	Kolangal	Sangeetha	Tamil	
1996	Coimbatore Mappillai	Sumithra	Tamil	
1996	Tata Manavadu	Swati	Telugu	
1996	Oho Naa Pellanta Telugu	Suba	Telugu	
1996	Pudhu Nilavu		Tamil	
1996	Anthimanthaarai		Tamil	
1996	Veettukulle Thiruvizha	Abhirami	Tamil	
1996	Nayudu Gari Kutumbam	Keerthi	Telugu	
1996	Sarada Bullodu	Yamini	Telugu	
1997	Priyamaina Srivaru		Telugu	
1997	Mannava	Kavitha	Tamil	
1997	Dhinamum Ennai Gavani	Raji	Tamil	
1997	Abbai Gari Pelli		Telugu	
1997	Pattukondi Choodam		Telugu	
1997	Sindhooram	Baby	Telugu	
1997	Aahaa Enna Porutham	Sinthamani	Tamil	
1997	Porkkaalam	Muthamma	Tamil	
1998	Ulavuthurai	Sangeetha	Tamil	
1998	Sher-E-Hindustan	Naina	Hindi	
1998	Suryavamsam	Madhavi	Telugu	
1998	Subbaraju Gari Kutumbam		Telugu	
1998	Ini Ellam Sugame	Nandhini	Tamil	
1998	Bhagavath Singh	Sarojini	Tamil	
1998	All Rounder	Ramya	Telugu	
1998	Sivayya	Sirisha	Telugu	
1998	Nilaave Vaa	Filomina	Tamil	
1998	Ellame En Pondattithaan	Geetha	Tamil	
1998	Zulm-O-Sitam		Hindi	Special appearance
1998	Aahaa..!	Janaki	Telugu	
1998	Kodukulu		Telugu	
1998	Swarnamukhi		Telugu	
1999	Samarasimha Reddy	Neelaveni	Telugu	
1999	Manikyam		Telugu	
1999	Seetharama Raju	Gowri	Telugu	
1999	Holi	Seena	Malayalam	
1999	Pilla Nachindi	Preethi	Telugu	
1999	Preyasi Rave	Soni Maganti	Telugu	
2000	Ravanna		Telugu	
2000	Goppinti Alludu	Jalandhara	Telugu	
2000	Okkadu Chalu		Telugu	
2000	Pelli Sambandham		Telugu	
2001	Mrugaraju	Sivangi	Telugu	
2001	Diggajaru	Parvathi	Kannada	
2001	Rishi	Nandhini	Tamil	
2001	Thaali Kaatha Kaaliamman	Ramya	Tamil	
2001	Orey Thammudu	Devi	Telugu	
2001	Chiranjeevulu	Kaveri	Telugu	
2001	Evadra Rowdy	Sathya	Telugu	
2001	Raja Rajeshwari	Meenakshi	Tamil	
2002	Dheera		Kannada	
2002	Neethone Vuntanu	Divya	Telugu	
2002	Lagna Patrika	Vaishnavi	Telugu	
2002	Parasuram	Vyjayanthi	Telugu	
2002	Lahiri Lahiri Lahirilo	Sindhu	Telugu	
2002	Varushamellam Vasantham		Tamil	
2002	Panchathantiram	Chamundi	Tamil	
2002	Baba	Lakshmi	Tamil	
2002	Hattoora Oedya		Kannada	
2002	Sandade Sandadi	Priya	Telugu	
2003	Galatta Ganapathy	Nandhini	Tamil	
2003	Shambu		Telugu	Special appearance
2004	Andhrawala	Shankar's wife	Telugu	
2004	Guri	Saira Bhanu	Telugu	
2004	Sullan	Lakshmi Mani	Tamil	Special appearance
2004	En Purushan Ethir Veetu Ponnu	Rekha	Tamil	
2005	Iyer IPS	Nasreen	Tamil	
2005	Okkade Kanni Iddaru	Dr. Madhumathi	Telugu	
2005	Aanai	Meena Jayaram	Tamil	
2006	Nidhi	Guardian	Kannada	
2007	Anatharu	Parvathi	Kannada	
2008	Indra		Kannada	
2019	Kolanji	Appasamy's wife	Tamil	

== Television ==
- 2008-2009: Gokulathil Seethai
- 2013: Savitri
- 2014: Kalabhairava
- Judged a show for Maa TV called Rangam
- 2017: Thai Veedu
- 2019: Jabardasth
- 2026: Palayathu Amman
