= Manikanda =

- Theatrical release poster
- Directed by: Selvaa
- Written by: G. K. Gopinath (dialogues)
- Story by: M. Rathnakumar
- Produced by: K. Dhandapani
- Starring: Arjun; Jyothika; Uma
- Cinematography: U. K. Senthil Kumar
- Edited by: Raghubob
- Music by: Deva
- Production company: Malar Combines
- Release date: 23 March 2007
- Running time: 133 minutes
- Country: India
- Language: Tamil

Manikanda is a 2007 Indian Tamil-language action drama film directed by Selvaa. Arjun plays a dual role, that of father and son. The film, which began production in 2002, went through more production, was finally released in 2007, and was promoted as Jyothika's "last release". It is a remake of the 2000 Telugu movie Jayam Manadera.

== Plot ==
Raja lives in Mumbai with his father. Mahalakshmi goes to Bombay to get the blessings of a godwoman but since she is unable to meet Mataji immediately, she is forced to stay in Mumbai for ten days and rents a guestroom among the many run by Raja. Love blossoms between Raja and Maha and when she returns to her village Maniyoor, he follows a few days later on her invitation. After he lands there, he discovers his own link to the village.

== Cast ==
- Arjun as Manikandan / Raja (dual role)
- Jyothika as Mahalakshmi (Maha)
- Uma as Lakshmi Manikandan
- Vadivelu as Madhayaanai
- Ashish Vidyarthi as Balasingam
- Chandrasekhar as Veerasamy
- Nalini as Mahalakshmi's mother
- P. Vasu as Mahalakshmi's grandfather
- Pasupathy
- Malavika
- Poovilangu Mohan
- Periya Karuppu Thevar
- Madhan Bob
- Aryan
- Singamuthu
- Thennavan
- Bonda Mani
- Halwa Vasu
- Priyanka as Maha's friend
- Jeeva
- O. A. K. Sundar
- Satya Prakash
- Vijay Ganesh
- Chelladurai
- Nellai Siva
- Kovai Senthil
- Siva Narayana Murthy as Mumbai Dhadha
- Sampath Ram

== Production ==
The film was completed by mid-2005, but faced delays.

== Soundtrack ==
Soundtrack was composed by Deva.

| Song | Singers | Lyrics |
|---|---|---|
| "Hey Mukundha" | Karthik, Pop Shalini | Na. Muthukumar |
| "Inji Murappa" | Tippu, Anuradha Sriram | Na. Muthukumar |
| "Madhippukuriya" | Manikka Vinayagam, Jayalakshmi | Piraisoodan |
| "Mama Mama" | Tippu, Anuradha Sriram | Na. Muthukumar |
| "Pondicherry" | Shankar Mahadevan, Harini | Kabilan |

== Critical reception ==
S. R. Ashok Kumar of The Hindu wrote the film "looks outdated" and added "It may not be a new storyline but with experienced artists and technicians it could have made an impression if it had been released on time". Indiareels wrote, "Taking the Pappapatti, Keeripatti issue as the crux, director Selva has tried to do something novel. But the clichés of commercial cinema had pulled his legs and stopped Selva from doing so. Being an end-to-end Arjun film, Maniganda too is no exception from thrilling action blocks. However, the movie fails to woo masses, since all the efforts were made sans logic in many scenes". Malini Mannath of Chennai Online wrote, "The scenes are disjointed, have many loose ends, and lack uniformity and a smooth flow. It's only towards the end that it perks up. But by then it's a bit too late to salvage matters". Chennai Vision wrote, "Being an end-to-end Arjun film, Maniganda too is no exception from thrilling action blocks. However, the movie fails to woo masses, since all the efforts were made sans logic in many scenes".
