= Thalaivaasal =

- Title card
- Directed by: Selvaa
- Written by: Selvaa; Murthy Ramesh (dialogues)
- Produced by: Chozha Ponnurangam
- Starring: S. P. Balasubrahmanyam; Anand; Sivaranjani; Bhanu Prakash; Nassar; Napoleon; Vijay; Vichithra
- Cinematography: R. Roy
- Edited by: Raju KN
- Music by: Bala Bharathi
- Production company: Chozha Creations
- Release date: 3 September 1992
- Running time: 140 minutes
- Country: India
- Language: Tamil

Thalaivaasal (transl. The main door) is a 1992 Indian Tamil-language drama film directed by Selvaa. The film has an ensemble cast consisting of S. P. Balasubrahmanyam, Anand, Sivaranjani, Bhanu Prakash, Nassar, Napoleon and newcomer Vijay. It was released on 3 September 1992.

== Plot ==
Nachiappan College is considered to be one of the worst colleges of Chennai; everyday violence erupts between two final-year groups. The students are influenced by the local bigwig Beeda Settu (Nassar), who sells ganja to the students and basically rules the college from outside. The first group is led by Sudhakar (Anand) whereas the other one is led by Kalaiarasan (Bhanu Prakash). The college management and the police get tired of that situation. They decide that they need to change the principal. The vice-principal, Chandran, dies to sit in that post but the college management asks the successful Shanmugasundaram (S. P. Balasubrahmanyam) to take the post. His daughter Shobana will study in the same college. The rest of the story is how Shanmugasundaram succeeds in his mission.

== Cast ==
- S. P. Balasubrahmanyam as Shanmugasundaram
- Anand as Sudhakar
- Sivaranjani as Shobana
- Bhanu Prakash as Kalaiarasan (credited as Bharathan)
- Nassar as Beeda Settu
- Napoleon as Chandran
- Vijay as Babu
- S. N. Vasanth as Gupta
- Chitti as ACP Devaraj
- Sabitha Anand as Saradha
- Vaishnavi as Anandhi
- Vichithra as 'Madippu' Hamsa
- C.N.A. Parimal
- Sampath Kumar
- Vincent Roy as Vedachalam
- Jayaprakash
- Radhabhai
- Swaminathan
- Master Anand as Siddharth
- Baby Shobana as Meena
- MRK

== Production ==
The success of the television serial Neela Maala facilitated Chozha Creations' re-entry into the film industry, and they gave the television director Selvaa the opportunity to direct Thalaivasal. Except S. P. Balasubrahmanyam and Nassar, most of the cast was new like Bhanu Prakash and Vijay.

== Soundtrack ==
The music was composed by Bala Bharathi, with lyrics by Vairamuthu.

Song	Singer(s)	Duration
"Athi Kaalai Kaatre Nillu"	S. Janaki	4:35
"Mayajala Ulagam"	Bala Bharathi	3:42
"Naalaikum Naam"	S. P. Balasubrahmanyam, Mano	4:04
"Unnai Thottu"	S. P. Balasubrahmanyam, K. S. Chithra	4:29
"Vaan Nilave"	Ashok	1:52
"Vaasal Idhu Vaasal"	S. P. Balasubrahmanyam	3:46
"Vaazhkai Embadhu"	S. P. Balasubrahmanyam	4:41

== Reception ==
Malini Mannath of The Indian Express wrote, "Debutant writer-director Chelva has taken up a subject with which he does not seem to be familiar". The film completed a 100-day run at the box-office.

== Legacy ==
After the film's success, Vijay added Thalaivaasal as his prefix.
