= Student Number 1 =

- Poster
- Directed by: Selvaa
- Written by: Selvaa (Screenplay & Dialogue)
- Story by: Pruthvi Raj
- Based on: Student No. 1 by S. S. Rajamouli
- Produced by: Sarath
- Starring: Sibiraj; Sherin; Manivannan; Yugendran; Nassar
- Cinematography: U. K. Senthil Kumar
- Edited by: Raghu Babu
- Music by: Maragatha Mani
- Production company: Sena Films
- Release date: 14 February 2003
- Running time: 126 minutes
- Country: India
- Language: Tamil

Student No.1 is a 2003 Indian Tamil-language coming of age action film directed by Selvaa. The film stars Sibiraj in his debut and Sherin in lead roles alongside Manivannan, Yugendran and Nassar among others. This movie is a remake of the 2001 Telugu film of the same name. Student Number 1 was panned by critics and flopped at the box office.

== Cast ==
- Sibiraj as Sibi
- Sherin as Anjali
- Manivannan as Professor
- Yugendran as Sathya
- Nassar as Raghavan
- Thalaivasal Vijay as Advocate
- Ravikumar as Judge
- Nizhalgal Ravi as Jailor
- Vinu Chakravarthy as "Leakage" Sambasivam
- Pandu as Sambasivam's sidekick
- Vanitha Krishnachandran as Sibi's mother
- Preethi as Sibi's sister
- Maaran as Sathya's friend
- Vidharth as Sathya's classmate
- Halwa Vasu as Bus conductor

== Production ==
Shooting was commenced at Chennai, for a fifteen-days schedule, after which the unit moved to Russia to shoot two songs. The rest of the songs were shot at locations in Andhra Pradesh. A set at a cost of about two lakhs was erected on the beach in Visakhapatnam and it took six days to picturise a song. Choreographing the dance steps was dance choreographer Tarunraj. Sibiraj said that first scene which was shot on him was "where I enter the college library, and find Sherin and her friends dancing to taped music. I stop the tape and advice the girls".

== Soundtrack ==
The music was composed by Maragatha Mani and released by Pyramid Music. Lyrics were written by Na. Muthukumar, Kabilan and Annamalai. Except "Kadhal Thozhi" (which replaced "Kaastha Ninnu"), all other tunes were retained from the original.

Track-List
No.	Title	Lyrics	Singer(s)	Length
1.	"Vizhamale Irukka Mudiyuma"	Na. Muthukumar	S. P. B. Charan, K. S. Chithra	4:38
2.	"Engeyo Thondri"	Kabilan	Karthik, Chorus	5:17
3.	"Kathal Natpai Maruma"	Annamalai	Unni Krishnan, Anuradha Sriram	4:18
4.	"Kadhal Thozhi"	Kabilan	Tippu, Kalpana	5:05
5.	"Salute Podu"	Na. Muthukumar	Tippu, Chorus	4:11
6.	"Kadalora Kavithye"	Na. Muthukumar	Yugendran, Kalpana, Chorus	5:09
Total length:				28:38

== Reception ==
Sify wrote "The problem with the story is that it is too hackneyed and predictable. No one expects too much reality from a launch film of a star son, but the plot here is silly". Chennai Online wrote "The original film in Telugu starring NTR Jr., was a big success. But this version has turned out to be just an average entertainer. The plus point is that it has given yet another promising hero to Tamil films. Sibiraj (son of hero Satyaraj) goes through the entire gamut of emotions which the role has offered him without much hitch". Krishna Chidambaram of Kalki felt Sibiraj recited dialogues without emotion and should work on his acting capabilities by joining a film school but praised Senthilkumar's cinematography for showing Russia beautifully and concluded saying we express our worries to Sathyaraj and express our sympathies to the people who watched the film.
