= Karnaa =

- Theatrical release poster
- Directed by: Selvaa
- Screenplay by: Selvaa
- Story by: Arjun
- Produced by: V. Ramesh
- Starring: Arjun; Ranjitha; Vineetha
- Cinematography: K. S. Selvaraj
- Edited by: P. Venkateswara Rao
- Music by: Vidyasagar
- Production company: Vijaya Madhavi Combines
- Release date: 14 April 1995
- Running time: 140 minutes
- Country: India
- Language: Tamil

Karnaa is a 1995 Indian Tamil-language action drama film directed by Selvaa. The film stars Arjun in a dual role, alongside Ranjitha and Vineetha. It was released on 14 April 1995, and became a box office success.

== Plot ==
Vijay is a carefree youth, who is sent by his father ACP Deenadayalan in Ooty to work and become a responsible businessman. He falls in love with the college student Anjali, whose brothers are dangerous criminals and they are against their love from the fact that Vijay's father is a cop. Devaraj is sent to prison in order for his brother to appoint the lawyer Karnaa, who is disabled and Vijay's doppelganger.

Later, Karnaa falls in love with the school teacher Amudha, after few quarrels among them. One day, Deenadayalan sees Karnaa at the court who is identical to his Vijay. In the past, Deenadayalan had twin boys, but abandoned one of the twin babies because he was disabled. Karnaa is upset when he learns the truth and is now determined to win the case in front of his father. He ultimately wins the case and Devaraj is eventually released. Deenadayalan discloses the truth to his wife Lakshmi, who wants to bring back her son Karnaa at any cost.

Meanwhile, Vijay is arrested by the police because of Devaraj's conspiracy. Karnaa rejects his parents' pleas and finds it outrageous to abandon a baby due to his disability. Karnaa promises to help Vijay, but he advises Vijay to escape from the prison. Devaraj shows his secret illegal business to Karnaa, and Vijay takes some photos of his factory. Afterwards, Devaraj's goons kidnap their parents, Karnaa's adopted mother and Amudha. Vijay and Karnaa finally save them and send Devaraj to prison.

== Cast ==
- Arjun in dual role as Vijay and Karnaa
- Ranjitha as Amudha
- Vineetha as Anjali
- Goundamani as Khalnayak
- Senthil as Driver
- Ravichandran as ACP Deenadhayalan, Vijay and Karnaa's father
- Major Sundararajan as Advocate
- Sujatha as Lakshmi, Vijay and Karnaa's mother
- Sathyapriya as Karnaa's adopted mother
- Mohan Raj as Devaraj
- Vimalraj as Devaraj's brother
- Kitty as Karnaa's foster father
- Chakravarthy
- C. R. Saraswathi as Manikkam's wife
- Vasuki as Vatsala teacher
- Lalitha Kumari as Chellamma
- Lakshmipriya
- Radhabhai
- Kumarimuthu
- Kallapart Natarajan
- Idichapuli Selvaraj as Chellamma's father
- Krishnamoorthy as Manikkam
- T. K. S. Natarajan as Pimp
- Prasanna Kumar as Advocate
- Sakthivel as Henchman
- Vijay Ganesh as Henchman
- Yuvarani in a special appearance
- Rani in a special appearance
- Madhusudhan Rao as CBI officer (uncredited)

== Production ==
While filming the climactic action sequence, stuntman Sahul wanted to try out a bike stunt in a manner inspired by Jackie Chan. Though the producer was hesitant, Arjun was convinced. Sahul managed the sequence in a single take.

== Soundtrack ==
The soundtrack was composed by Vidyasagar, with lyrics written by Vairamuthu. The song "Malare Mounama" is set in Darbari Kanada raga. "Aai Shabba" is largely based on the song "Chebba" by Algerian singer Khaled, while "Malare Mounama" is based on Vidyasagar's own Telugu song "Okate Korika" from Chirunavvula Varamistava (1993).

All lyrics are written by Vairamuthu; all music is composed by Vidyasagar.

Track listing
No.	Title	Singer(s)	Length
1.	"Kannile Kannile"	Mano, Sindhu	4:06
2.	"Aye Shabba"	Mano, Swarnalatha	4:27
3.	"Malare Mounamma"	S. P. Balasubrahmanyam, S. Janaki, Srinivas (Alaap humming)	5:05
4.	"Aala Maram"	Vidyasagar	1:15
5.	"Putham Puthu Desam"	S. P. Balasubrahmanyam, S. Janaki	5:30
6.	"Hello Chellamma"	Arjun, Ouseppachan, Swarnalatha, Goundamani	5:17
Total length:			25:41

== Reception ==
K. Vijiyan of New Straits Times wrote, "Karna turns out to be a neat package of sentiment, love, action and songs". R. P. R. of Kalki wrote there are two types of masala: action masala and sentiment masala. R. P. R. wrote that the former makes body painful while the latter makes nose pain. He added that the makers had mixed both and taken it with the goal of entertainment without much wrinkle and spillage.
