= Vivek filmography =

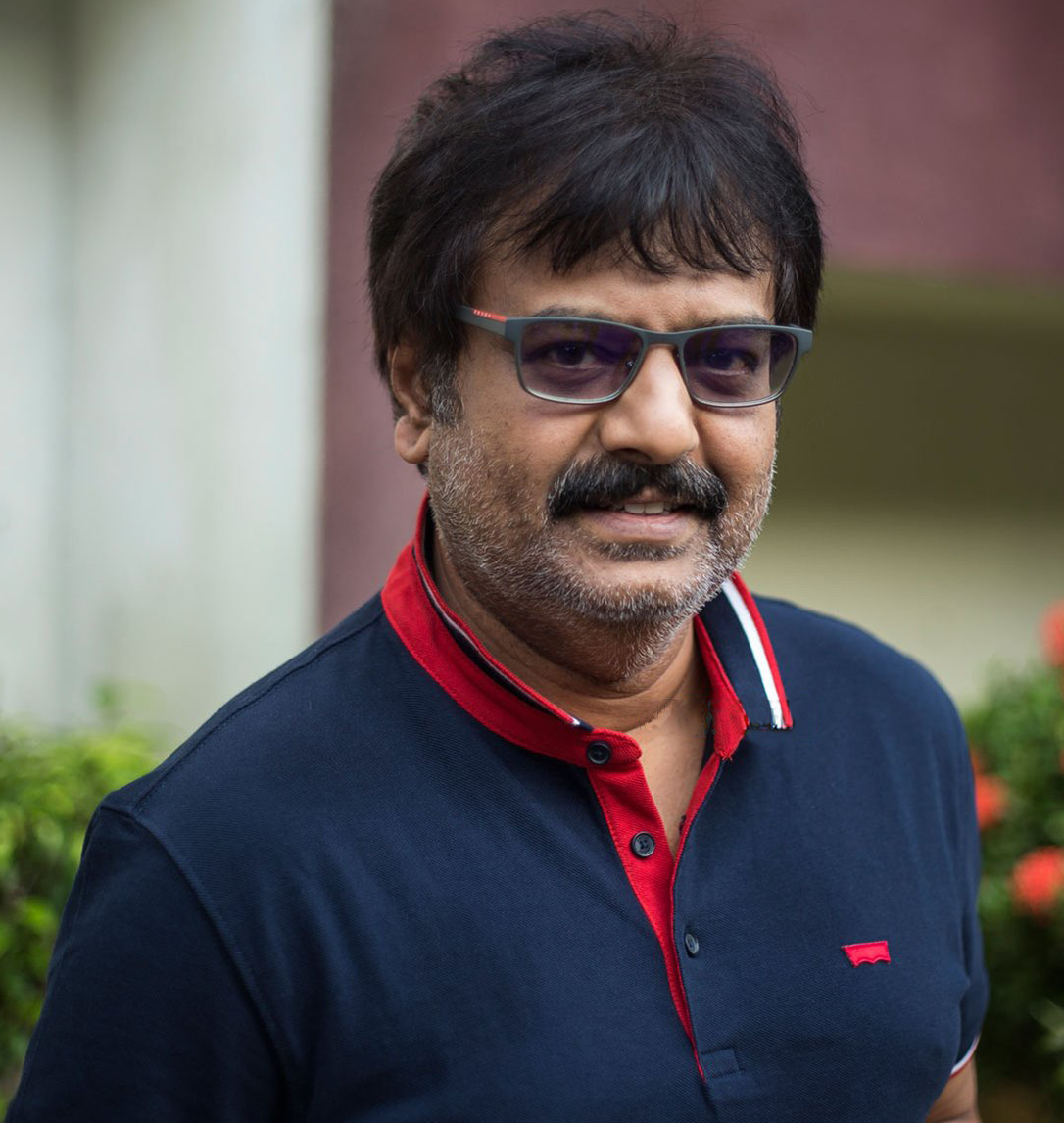
Vivek

Vivek (1961–2021) was an Indian actor and comedian who worked mainly in Tamil cinema. He won three Filmfare Best Comedian Awards for his performances in Run, Saamy and Perazhagan. In April 2009, Vivek received the Padma Shri award by the Government of India for his contribution to the arts. He was introduced to filmdom by renowned director K. Balachander.

This is a complete list of films acted by comedian Vivek.

== Filmography ==
=== Films ===
==== Actor ====
- All films are in Tamil, unless otherwise noted.

List of Vivek film acting credits
Year	Title	Role	Notes	Ref.
1987	Manathil Uruthi Vendum	Vivek		
1989	Pudhu Pudhu Arthangal	Vittal		
1990	Oru Veedu Iru Vasal	Panneer		
1990	Aarathi Edungadi	Vivek		
1990	Keladi Kanmani	Adaikkalam's friend		
1991	Nanbargal	Gopi		
1991	Sendhoora Devi	Gopal		
1991	Idhaya Vaasal	Joint		
1991	Anbu Sangili	Ku. Rangu		
1991	Idhaya Oonjal	Babu's friend		
1991	Jenma Natchathram	David		
1991	MGR Nagaril	Gopal		
1991	Putham Pudhu Payanam	Vivek		
1992	Thambi Pondatti	Mani		
1992	Innisai Mazhai	Michael		
1992	Nadodi Pattukkaran			
1992	Tamil Ponnu			
1992	Pudhusa Padikkiren			
1992	Kalikaalam	Krishnamoorthy's son		
1992	Urimai Oonjaladugiradhu	Narayanan		
1992	Kizhakku Veedhi			
1993	Uzhaippali	Tamizharasan's friend		
1993	Naan Pesa Ninaipathellam	Govind		
1993	Pass Mark			
1993	Rajadhi Raja Raja Kulothunga Raja Marthanda; Raja Gambeera Kathavaraya Krishna Kamarajan	Vivek		
1993	Enga Muthalali	Pandurangan ('Bambaram' Pandu)		
1993	Puthiya Thendral	Vivek		
1994	Vaanga Partner Vaanga	Koteeswaran		
1994	Veera	Muthu's friend		
1994	Pudhiya Mannargal	Aaraaichi		
1994	Vaa Magale Vaa		Guest appearance	
1994	Namma Annachi	Nallathambi		
1994	Watchman Vadivel			
1994	Pattukottai Periyappa	TTR Manmadan		
1994	Vanaja Girija	Appu		
1995	Thottil Kuzhandhai			
1995	Muthukulikka Vaariyala		Uncredited role	
1995	Mogamul	Raja		
1995	Thedi Vandha Raasa	Vivek		
1995	Nandhavana Theru	Beedi		
1995	Gandhi Pirantha Mann	Cook		
1995	Mayabazar	Kuppu		
1995	Ilaya Ragam	Saamy		
1996	Thayagam	Hostage		
1996	Avathara Purushan	Adaikalam		
1996	Minor Mappillai	Kicha		
1996	Vetri Mugam	Raghu		
1996	Enakkoru Magan Pirappan	Raja		
1996	Aavathum Pennale Azhivathum Pennale	Dhanush		
1996	Subash	Subash's friend		
1997	Kaalamellam Kadhal Vaazhga	Haridas		
1997	Dhinamum Ennai Gavani	Balram		
1997	Sishya			
1997	Pongalo Pongal	Pazhanisamy		
1997	Periya Idathu Mappillai	Ramu		
1997	Pagaivan	Prabhu's friend		
1997	Nerrukku Ner	Ravi		
1998	Kaadhale Nimmadhi	Panchu		
1998	Maru Malarchi	Nagarajan		
1998	Naam Iruvar Namakku Iruvar	Parthasarathy		
1998	Kaadhal Mannan	Oiyaa		
1998	Harichandra	Gopal		
1998	Sollamale	Wilson		
1998	Kannedhirey Thondrinal	Raju		
1998	Unnudan	Santosh's friend		
1999	Ninaivirukkum Varai	Vinod		
1999	Unnai Thedi	Vivek		
1999	Poomagal Oorvalam	Sakthi		
1999	Vaalee	Vicky	Also credited for comedy track	
1999	Oruvan			
1999	Viralukketha Veekkam	Ramanathan		
1999	Unakkaga Ellam Unakkaga	Mathi		
1999	Mugam			
1999	Thirupathi Ezhumalai Venkatesa	Vivek		
1999	Unnaruge Naan Irundhal	Film director	Winner, Tamil Nadu State Film Award for Best Comedian	
1999	Aasaiyil Oru Kaditham	Ramalingam		
2000	Thirunelveli	Soonaswamy's son		
2000	Eazhaiyin Sirippil	Arasu		
2000	Good Luck			
2000	Sudhandhiram	Surfraj		
2000	Thai Poranthachu	Kutti		
2000	Mugavaree	Ramesh		
2000	Alaipayuthey	Sethu		
2000	Sandhitha Velai			
2000	Kandha Kadamba Kathir Vela	Kathirvelan		
2000	Kushi	Vicky		
2000	Karisakattu Poove	Veeramani		
2000	Pennin Manathai Thottu	Kandasamy		
2000	Koodi Vazhnthal Kodi Nanmai	Dhandapani		
2000	Doubles	Vivek		
2000	Unnai Kann Theduthey			
2000	Budget Padmanabhan	Krishnan		
2000	Palayathu Amman	Kalyanaraman		
2000	Priyamaanavale	Chandru		
2000	Seenu	Palanisamy		
2000	Kanden Seethaiyai	Indrajith	Tamil dubbed film	
2001	Lovely	Azhagesh		
2001	Looty	Thiruttu VCD Thyagarajan		
2001	Nageshwari			
2001	Engalukkum Kaalam Varum	Santhosh		
2001	Ullam Kollai Poguthae	Arivu		
2001	Minnale	Chokkalingam		
2001	Badri	Azhagu		
2001	Dumm Dumm Dumm	Jim		
2001	Middle Class Madhavan	Manimaaran		
2001	Dhill	Megaserial Mahadevan		
2001	Super Kudumbam	Hari		
2001	Kanna Unnai Thedukiren			
2001	Kutty	Provision shop owner		
2001	Viswanathan Ramamoorthy	Ramamoorthy		
2001	Poovellam Un Vasam	Varathan		
2001	Alli Thandha Vaanam	Tamilkirukkan /Tamilkirukkan's father		
2001	12B	Madhan		
2001	Manadhai Thirudivittai	Valayapathi		
2001	Paarthale Paravasam	Bootham		
2001	Shahjahan	Bhoopathi		
2001	Kottai Mariamman			
2001	Majunu	Mano		
2001	Vadagupatti Maapillai	Rowther		
2002	Shakalaka Baby	Sundara Chozhan		
2002	Azhagi	Desigan		
2002	Vivaramana Aalu	"Suitcase" Subbu		
2002	Roja Kootam	'Auto' Aarumugam		
2002	Thamizhan	Nandakumar		
2002	Thenkasi Pattanam	Maanikkam Pillai alias Maappillai		
2002	Yai! Nee Romba Azhaga Irukke!	Subbu		
2002	Youth	Karuthu Kanthaswamy		
2002	Run	Mohan	Winner, Filmfare Best Comedian Award; Winner, Tamil Nadu State Film Award for Best Comedian; Winner, ITFA Best Comedian Award	
2002	Namma Veetu Kalyanam	Gopi		
2002	University	"Allthotta" Bhoopathi		
2002	Kadhal Virus	Puthir		
2002	Devan	Saravanan		
2003	Dhool	Narayana Swamy (Naren)	Nominated, Vijay Award for Best Comedian	
2003	Pop Corn			
2003	Kadhal Sadugudu	"Super" Subbu		
2003	Anbe Anbe	Cheenu's uncle		
2003	Saamy	Kudumi Venkatraman	Winner, Filmfare Best Comedian Award; Winner, ITFA Best Comedian Award	
2003	Lesa Lesa	Chandru		
2003	Parthiban Kanavu	Mano	Winner, Tamil Nadu State Film Award for Best Comedian	
2003	Ice	Pulikesi		
2003	Whistle	Sahadevan		
2003	Kadhal Kisu Kisu	Thamizhselvan		
2003	Thithikudhe	"Punch" Bala		
2003	Thennavan	Dada Mani		
2003	Boys	Mangalam		
2003	Alai	Madhan		
2003	Three Roses	Shankar/Bala Mani Bharathi		
2003	Thirumalai	Pazhani		
2003	Enakku 20 Unakku 18	Kabali (Kapil)		
2003	Joot	Siva		
2003	Athanda Ithanda	Punyakodi		
2004	Udhaya	Basheer		
2004	Aethirree	Sampath		
2004	Perazhagan	"Marriage Assembler" Kuzhandaisaamy	Winner, Filmfare Best Comedian Award	
2004	Thilak	Rajadurai	Tamil dubbed film	
2004	Chellamae	Harichandra		
2004	Arasatchi	Hotel Assistant Manager		
2004	M. Kumaran S/O Mahalakshmi	Ganesh		
2005	Thaka Thimi Tha	Vivek		
2005	Kana Kandaen	Sivaramakrishnan		
2005	Anniyan	Chaari	Winner, Tamil Nadu State Film Award for Best Comedian	
2005	Anbe Vaa	Nandha		
2005	Vanakkam Thalaiva	Erisamy		
2006	Paramasivan	Agniputran		
2006	Saravana	V. C. Damodaran		
2006	Aathi	Bullet	Winner, Vijay Award for Best Comedian	
2006	Kalvanin Kadhali	Babloo		
2006	Madrasi	Paandi		
2006	Thiruttu Payale	Ceylon Yogaraasa		
2006	Madhu	Madhan		
2006	Nee Venunda Chellam	Renigunta Reddy (Royapettah Ramu)		
2006	Jambhavan	Subhash		
2007	Aalwar	Pons		
2007	Agaram	Thiru's friend		
2007	Sivaji	Arivu	Winner, Tamil Nadu State Film Award for Best Comedian	
2007	Thullal	Muthu		
2007	Kireedam	Shaktivel's brother-in-law		
2007	Veerappu	Ratthan		
2007	Urchagam	Ayyanaarkudi Raja		
2007	Pasupathi c/o Rasakkapalayam	Daas		
2008	Thoondil	Mac		
2008	Singakutty	Balu		
2008	Sandai	Mani/Naattamai		
2008	Kuruvi	Aaps	Winner, ITFA Best Comedian Award; Nominated, Vijay Award for Best Comedian	
2008	Aayudham Seivom	Traffic Kanthasaamy		
2008	Jayamkondaan	Gopal		
2008	Durai	"Arusuvai" Ambi		
2008	Bommalattam	Madurai		
2009	Padikkadavan	"Assault" Arumugam	Nominated, Filmfare Award for Best Supporting Actor - Tamil	
2009	Perumal	Idithangi/Indrasena Reddy		
2009	1977	Paraman		
2009	Guru En Aalu	Azhagappan	Winner, Edison Award for Best Comedian	
2009	Indira Vizha	"Oppila" Mani		
2009	Ainthaam Padai	Thaanthoni		
2009	Anthony Yaar?	Kingfisher		
2010	Thambikku Indha Ooru	"Cola" Kumar		
2010	Sivappu Mazhai	Periyasamy a.k.a. Petersamy		
2010	Magane En Marumagane	"Singapetti" Singaram		
2010	Singam	Erimalai	Nominated, Vijay Award for Best Comedian	
2010	Pen Singam	Thirupathi		
2010	Bale Pandiya	London		
2010	Vaadaa	Annamalai		
2010	Uthama Puthiran	"Emotional" Ekambaram		
2011	Seedan	Gumbidiswamy		
2011	Bhavani	Girivalam		
2011	Mappillai	Child Chinna (JP)	Nominated, Vijay Award for Best Comedian	
2011	Oru Nunakkadha	Singam	Malayalam film	
2011	Vedi	Varun Sandesh	Winner, ITFA Best Comedian Award	
2012	Murattu Kaalai	Saroja		
2013	Chandra	Yuvaraj Sukumar	Kannada film	
2013	Kantha	Thangamagan/'Kunju' Mani		
2013	Singam II	Erimalai	Nominated, Vijay Award for Best Comedian	
2013	Pathayeram Kodi	Shankar Lal		
2014	Ninaithathu Yaaro	Himself	Guest appearance	
2014	Chandra	Yuvaraj Sukumar		
2014	Naan Than Bala	Bala		
2014	Velaiyilla Pattathari	Azhagusundaram	Winner, SIIMA Award for Best Comedian; Nominated, Vijay Award for Best Comedian	
2014	Vingyani	Nagendran		
2015	Killadi	Arnold		
2015	Yennai Arindhaal	"Revolver" Richard		
2015	Vai Raja Vai	Pandian (Panda)		
2015	Touring Talkies	Himself	Cameo appearance	
2015	Buddhanin Sirippu	Sundar Raj		
2015	Palakkattu Madhavan	Palakattu Madhavan	also lyrics for song "Uchimela"	
2015	Sakalakala Vallavan	Vettaiyan/Pasupathy	also singer for "Bulb Vaangitten"	
2016	Thozha	Lingam		
2016	Manithan	Surya		
2016	Kaashmora	Kaashmora's father		
2017	Rum	Raj		
2017	Muthuramalingam	Rajasekar Kaalakeyan		
2017	Mupparimanam	Himself	Guest appearance	
2017	Brindavanam	Vivek		
2017	Meesaya Murukku	Ramachandran		
2017	Velaiilla Pattadhari 2	Azhagusundaram		
2017	Sakka Podu Podu Raja	Delhi		
2018	Ezhumin	Vishwanathan	also lyrics for "Ezhu Ezhu"	
2019	Viswasam	Kesavan		
2019	Vellai Pookal	Rudhran		
2019	Bigil	Nessi		
2020	Dharala Prabhu	Kannadaasan	Last film Winner, SIIMA Award for Best Comedian	
2021	Aranmanai 3	Sigamani	Posthumous release	
2022	The Legend	Thangam	Posthumous release	
2023	Yaadhum Oore Yaavarum Kelir	Father Xavier	Posthumous release	
2024	Indian 2	Elango (AI generated)	Posthumous release	
2024	Oru Thee	Jim Carry	Posthumous release	
2026	Meesaya Murukku 2	Ramachandran (Archive footage from Meesaya Murukku)	Posthumous release	
TBA	Indian 3	Elango (AI generated and final film role)	Posthumous release	

Key
†	Denotes films that have not yet been released

=== Television ===
List of Vivek television credits
Year	Title	Role	Channel	Notes	Ref.
1989	Rail Sneham		DD Podhigai		
1994	Top Tucker	Parasuraman	Sun TV		
1995	Philips Super 10		Sun TV		
—	Mel Maadi Gaali		DD Podhigai		
2021	LOL: Enga Siri Paapom	Host/Judge	Amazon Prime	Posthumous Release	

=== As singer ===
List of Vivek film credits as singer
Year	Film	Song(s)	Composer	Notes	Ref.
2000	Kandha Kadamba Kathirvela	"Kandha Kadamba"	S. A. Rajkumar		
2000	Kanden Seethaiyai	"Vinyayathai Nambi"	V. S. Udhaya		
2001	Badri	"Stella Miss Laara"	Ramana Gogula		
2007	Solli Adippen	"Nee Sikkunu"	Deva		
2015	Sakalakala Vallavan	"Bulb Vaangitten"	Thaman		
2015	Touring Talkies	"Touring Talkies"	Ilayaraja	co-sung with Vijay Antony, Mukesh Mohamed, Sathyan; lyrics by Muthamizh	
2017	Brindavanam	"Giji Giji Saare"	Vivek Chandrasekhar		

=== As lyricist ===
List of Vivek film credits as lyricist
Year	Film	Song(s)	Composer	Notes	Ref.
2001	Super Kudumbam	"Millenium Figuregalae"	Adhityan		
2015	Palakattu Madhavan	"Uchimela"	Srikanth Deva		
2018	Ezhumin	"Ezhu Ezhu"	Ganesh Chandrasekaran		

=== As voice actor ===
List of Vivek film credits as voice actor
Year	Film	Character	Ref.
1998	Uyire	Phone booth owner	
