= Kannathil Muthamittal =

- Theatrical release poster
- Directed by: Mani Ratnam
- Written by: Mani Ratnam
- Dialogues by: Sujatha
- Based on: "Amuthavum Avanum" by Sujatha
- Produced by: Mani Ratnam; G. Srinivasan
- Starring: R. Madhavan; Simran; P. S. Keerthana; Nandita Das
- Cinematography: Ravi K. Chandran
- Edited by: A. Sreekar Prasad
- Music by: A. R. Rahman
- Production company: Madras Talkies
- Distributed by: Madras Talkies
- Release date: 14 February 2002
- Running time: 137 minutes
- Country: India
- Language: Tamil

Kannathil Muthamittal (also released internationally as A Peck on the Cheek) is a 2002 Indian Tamil-language musical war film written, produced and directed by Mani Ratnam. It was based on a short story, "Amuthavum Avanum" by Sujatha. The film stars R. Madhavan, Simran and P. S. Keerthana with Nandita Das, J. D. Chakravarthy, Prakash Raj and Pasupathy portraying other pivotal characters. The film's score and soundtrack were composed by A. R. Rahman, while Ravi K. Chandran handled the cinematography. Mani Ratnam presents the story of a child of Sri Lankan Tamil parentage adopted by Indian parents, whose desire is to meet her biological mother in the midst of the Sri Lankan Civil War. It was released on 14 February 2002.

The film premiered at the 2002 Toronto International Film Festival and was additionally screened at the 2003 San Francisco International Film Festival. The film received high critical acclaim upon release and went on to win six National Film Awards, three Filmfare Awards South, six Cinema Express Awards, seven Tamil Nadu State Film Awards and Best Film awards at six international film festivals.

== Plot ==
In Mankulam, a Tamil village in northern Sri Lanka, Shyama marries Dileepan and becomes pregnant just as the Sri Lankan Civil War intensifies. Dileepan is an active insurgent fighting against the government forces as part of the separatist Liberation Tigers of Tamil Eelam (LTTE). While in the forest, the couple is caught by an encroaching Sri Lankan Army detachment; Dileepan forces a reluctant Shyama to flee while he stays behind to delay the troops. As the military assault devastates the village, the residents evacuate to India. Shyama initially resists, hoping for Dileepan's return, but eventually boards a precarious refugee vessel for the sake of her unborn child. Mid-journey, an older refugee reports seeing a heavily wounded Dileepan in the forest, but it is too late to turn back. Arriving at a refugee processing center in Rameswaram, Tamil Nadu, Shyama gives birth to a baby girl. Driven by a desperate hope that her husband is alive and a desire to join his cause, she abandons the infant at the camp and clandestinely returns to Sri Lanka.

Nine years later in Chennai, the young girl, Amudha, lives an idyllic life with her adoptive family: her father Thiruchelvan, an engineer and progressive writer who uses the pen name "Indira"; her mother Indira, a television newscaster; and her two younger brothers, Vinay and Akhil. On her ninth birthday, Thiruchelvan discloses to Amudha that she was adopted as an infant, and that her brothers are her parents' biological children. Shattered by the revelation, a traumatized Amudha emotionally withdraws from her family. In flashbacks, it is revealed that nine years prior, Thiruchelvan frequently visited the Rameswaram refugee camps for literary research, where he discovered the abandoned infant. Blocked from adopting her as a single man under Indian law, he proposed to his neighbor Indira, who had long harbored affection for him. They married, formalized the adoption, and named the child Amudha at Indira's suggestion.

Determined to find her biological roots, Amudha demands to meet her birth mother. When Indira insists that tracking an anonymous refugee is impossible, Amudha runs away to Rameswaram with her cousin to search the camp registry. Shocked by her persistence, her family intercepts her, and a sympathetic Thiruchelvan convinces Indira to take Amudha to war-torn Sri Lanka to search for Shyama. Arriving in Colombo, they are hosted by Dr. Harold Wickramasinghe, a Sinhalese physician and friend of Thiruchelvan who agrees to guide them into the volatile northern territories. Throughout the journey, Amudha's volatile and disrespectful behavior toward Indira strains the family dynamic as they witness the grim, everyday devastation of the civil war.

While scouting a rural jungle tract, Thiruchelvan and Wickramasinghe are captured by an armed LTTE patrol. Thiruchelvan defuses the situation by reciting regional Tamil poetry, prompting the insurgent commander, Pasupathy, to recognize him by his literary pseudonym. Thiruchelvan explains their humanitarian mission, revealing that their only lead is the name Shyama. Pasupathy reveals that Shyama is his sister, a deeply committed LTTE guerrilla operative currently living in hiding. Moved by the family's devotion, Pasupathy promises to escort Shyama to a designated park in a nearby town the following day.

The next morning, the family waits at the rendezvous point, but the meeting is violently disrupted when a sudden skirmish erupts between the Sri Lankan Army and an LTTE unit. During a frantic evacuation under heavy artillery fire, Indira is wounded in the arm by a stray bullet. Confounded and deeply guilt-ridden by the violence her obsession has caused, a remorseful Amudha apologizes to Indira for her behavior and begs to return to India. The next day, as they travel to the airport, a resilient Indira insists on returning to the park one last time. Shyama arrives just as the family pulls up. In an intensely emotional reunion, Amudha presents her biological mother with a childhood photo album and questions her about the abandonment. Shyama gently comforts her, explaining the agonizing circumstances of the war. When Amudha begs her to return with them to Chennai, Shyama tearfully refuses, stating her allegiance remains with her war-ravaged homeland, expressing hope for a peaceful future where they can reunite freely. As Shyama slips back into the jungle, Amudha embraces Thiruchelvan and Indira, tearfully kissing her mother as they head back home.

== Cast ==
- R. Madhavan as Thiruchelvan, also known by the pen-name Indira (his wife's name)
- Simran as Indira Thiruchelvan, Thiruchelvan's wife (voice-over by Deepa Venkat)
- P. S. Keerthana (Keerthana Parthiban) as T. Amudha, the adopted daughter of Thiruchelvan and Indira
- Nandita Das as M. D. Shyama, Amudha's biological mother (voice-over by Sukanya)
- Prakash Raj as Dr. Harold Wickramsinghe
- Chakravarthy as Dileepan, Amudha's biological father (voice-over by Thalaivasal Vijay)
- Delhi Kumar as D. Ganesan, Indira's father
- Pasupathy as Pasupathy, Shyama's brother
- Bala Singh as Devanathan
- M. S. Bhaskar as Shankaralingam
- Sashikumar as Sashi, a suicide bomber
- Master Suraj as Vinayan, son of Thiruchelvan and Indira
- Master Kethan as Akhilan, son of Thiruchelvan and Indira
- Eswari Rao as another Shyama (Voice-over by Mounika)
- Cuckoo Parameswaran as Sundari
- Pondy Ravi as Dhanraj
- Mu Ramaswamy as Sundaralingam
- Kamala Krishnaswamy as Kamala, Thiruchelvan's elder sister
- Siddharth as bus passenger (uncredited role)
- Shefali Chowdhury as a refugee (uncredited role)

== Production ==
=== Development ===
Like other Mani Ratnam projects, the film began production with very little official publicity in early 2001 with the media covering the project as either Manjal Kudai (Yellow Umbrella) or Kudaigal (Umbrellas). The film was reported of a trilogy of films based on love and peace in the backdrop of war after Roja (1992), Bombay (1995) and Dil Se (1998). The film was originally conceived as a taut racy thriller that centres on a script based on a female leader of a guerilla group – with Mani Ratnam later choosing to base the film on human relationships with the backdrop of the Sri Lankan Civil War. The title of the film was finally announced as Kannathil Muthammittal (If the cheek is kissed) in July 2001, after a famous phrase from a poem written by Subramanya Bharathi.

=== Casting ===
R. Madhavan was signed up to play a leading role in the film, with the venture becoming his third straight Mani Ratnam project after Alai Payuthey and the Mani Ratnam production, Dumm Dumm Dumm. For the role of Indira, Mani Ratnam considered casting Soundarya or relative newcomer Bhumika Chawla, before finalising Simran to portray the character. Assistant director Sudha Kongara also considered Brindha Sivakumar for Simran's role. Madhavan and Simran thus shot for two films simultaneously together, as they had also been cast in K. Balachandar's Paarthale Paravasam as a married couple. Nandita Das was also hired for the film, making her debut in Tamil films. P. S. Keerthana, the second daughter of actors Parthiban and Seetha, was cast the child artiste in the film, while Prakash Raj was also hired to play a Sinhalese character. Mani Ratnam approached actor Vikram to make a special appearance as Keerthana's biological father in the film, but his refusal meant that J. D. Chakravarthy was later handed the role.

=== Filming ===
The shoot began in Chennai with a ten-day schedule in the Besant Nagar area. Parts of the film shown to be Colombo in the film were shot in Puducherry. Further schedules were carried out in the forests of Kerala to depict the base of the LTTE in northern Sri Lanka. Nandita Das in a later interview mentioned that the team shot for nearly thirteen hours a day. As most of the cast were non-native Tamil speakers, dubbing artistes were used with actresses Sukanya and Deepa Venkat lending their voices for Nandita Das and Simran respectively. Furthermore, Mounika lent her voice for Easwari Rao's character, while Thalaivasal Vijay spoke lines for Chakravarthy.

== Music ==
Kannathil Muthamittal

Soundtrack album by A. R. Rahman
- Released: 13 January 2002
- Recorded: 2001–2002
- Studios: Panchathan Record Inn and AM Studios, Chennai
- Genre: Feature film soundtrack
- Length: 35:12
- Language: Tamil
- Labels: Tips Music (Tamil); Bayshore Records; Adithya Music (Telugu)
- Producer: A. R. Rahman

A. R. Rahman chronology
Alli Arjuna (2002)	Kannathil Muthamittal (2002)	Boys (2002)

The soundtrack featuring six songs was released on 13 January 2002 by the label Tips Music. This film marked the debut of playback singer Chinmayi into the film industry at the age of 15. The score and soundtrack fetched A. R. Rahman his fourth National Film Award for Best Music Direction. Lyricist Vairamuthu too won the National Film Award for Best Lyrics, for the song "Kannathil Muthamittal". For the Telugu dubbed version Amrutha, it was released under Aditya Music with lyrics by Veturi.

All tracks are written by Vairamuthu.

No.	Title	Singer(s)	Length
1.	"Vellai Pookal"	A. R. Rahman	5:18
2.	"Sundari"	Hariharan, Tippu, Sujatha Mohan, Karthik, Srimathumitha	4:52
3.	"Oru Dheivam Thantha Poove" (Male)	P. Jayachandran, Chinmayi	6:37
4.	"Signore Signore (lyrics:B.H.Abdul Hameed)"	Swarnalatha, Anupama, Karthik, Rafique, Noel James	3:31
5.	"Vidai Kodu Engal Naadae"	M. S. Viswanathan, Balram, Febi Mani, A. R. Reihana, Manikka Vinayagam	6:12
6.	"Oru Dheivam Thantha Poove" (Female)	Chinmayi, P. Jayachandran	6:35
7.	"Sattena Nenaindhadhu Nenjam"	Minmini	2:07
Total length:			35:12

== Release ==
The film opened to positive reviews from critics. On the review aggregator website Rotten Tomatoes, 80% of 5 critics' reviews are positive, with an average rating of 7.4/10.

Gauthaman Baskaran of The Hindu Frontline wrote the film is "certainly a must for those who still believe in meaningful cinema", while praising Mani Ratnam's "grip on the medium".

== Accolades ==
List of accolades received by Kannathil Muthamittal
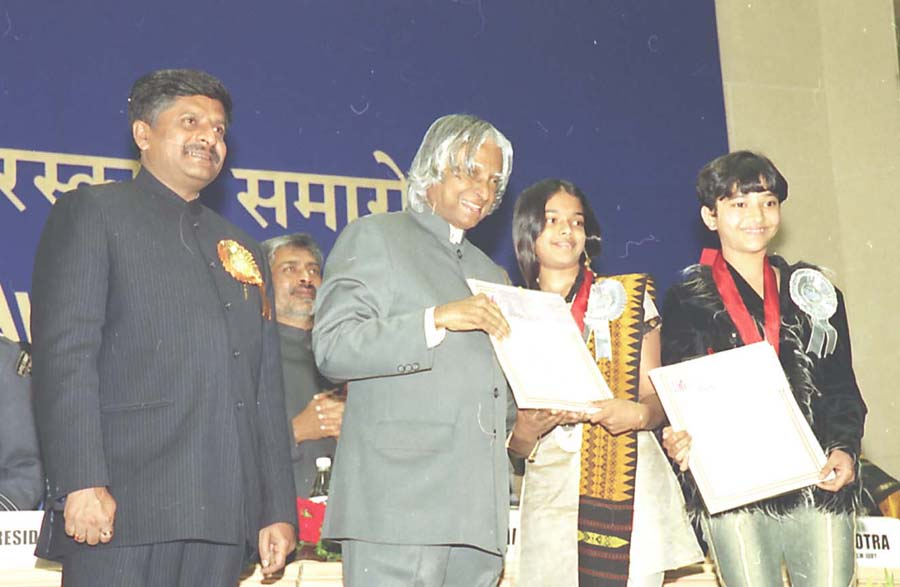
- The President Dr. A.P.J. Abdul Kalam presenting the Best Child Artist Award for the year 2002 to Keertana for her role as Amudha (along with Shweta Prasad, for the Hindi film "Makdee") at the 50th National Film Awards
Accolades
Award	Won	Nominated
National Film Awards	6	7
Filmfare Awards South	3	3
Tamil Nadu State Film Awards	7	7
Cinema Express Awards	6	6
International Tamil Film Awards	6	6
Indian Film Festival of Los Angeles	1	1
Jerusalem Film Festival	1	1
Film Fest New Haven	3	3
Zimbabwe International Film Festival	1	1
Westchester Film Festival	1	1
RiverRun International Film Festival	1	1
Ajanta Fine Arts	1	1
Best Media Associates Award	1	1
Bombay International Film Festival	0	1
SICA Awards	2	2
- Total number of awards and nominations (Note: Awards in certain categories do not have prior nominations and only winners are announced by the jury. For simplification and to avoid errors, each award in this list has been presumed to have had a prior nomination.)
Totals	40	42
- References

This is a list of awards and nominations received by the 2002 Indian Tamil-language film Kannathil Muthamittal. The film was highly appreciated upon its release and went on to win several awards and nominations at different award ceremonies the following year. It also had a highly acclaimed soundtrack which got A. R. Rahman his fourth National Film Award for Best Music Direction for the second consecutive time after Lagaan for both his songs and background score. The film holds a record of six National Film Awards wins which is the highest by any Tamil Film tied with Aadukalam and also being the highest for the year 2002. The film has won a total of 40 awards since its release.

=== Indian awards ===
Award	Date of ceremony (Note: Date is linked to the article about the awards held that year, wherever possible.)	Category	Recipient(s)	Result	Ref.
National Film Awards	29 December 2003	Best Feature Film in Tamil	Mani Ratnam (Madras Talkies)	Won	
National Film Awards	29 December 2003	Best Child Artist	P. S. Keerthana	Won	
National Film Awards	29 December 2003	Best Music Direction	A. R. Rahman	Won	
National Film Awards	29 December 2003	Best Lyrics	Vairamuthu	Won	
National Film Awards	29 December 2003	Best Audiography	H. Sridhar; A. S. Laxmi Narayanan	Won	
National Film Awards	29 December 2003	Best Editing	A. Sreekar Prasad	Won	
Filmfare Awards South	24 May 2003	Best Director – Tamil	Mani Ratnam	Won	
Filmfare Awards South	24 May 2003	Best Actress – Tamil	Simran	Won	
Filmfare Awards South	24 May 2003	Best Cinematographer – South	Ravi K. Chandran	Won	
Tamil Nadu State Film Awards	23 February 2006	Second Best Film	Mani Ratnam (Madras Talkies)	Won	
Tamil Nadu State Film Awards	23 February 2006	Best Director	Mani Ratnam	Won	
Tamil Nadu State Film Awards	23 February 2006	Best Art Director	Sabu Cyril	Won	
Tamil Nadu State Film Awards	23 February 2006	Best Actor	R. Madhavan	Won	
Tamil Nadu State Film Awards	23 February 2006	Best Child Artist	P. S. Keerthana	Won	
Tamil Nadu State Film Awards	23 February 2006	Special Prize Award	Nandita Das	Won	
Tamil Nadu State Film Awards	23 February 2006	Best Female Playback Singer	Chinmayi	Won	
Cinema Express Awards	21 December 2002	Best Film – Tamil	Mani Ratnam (Madras Talkies)	Won	
Cinema Express Awards	21 December 2002	Special Jury Award for Best Director	Mani Ratnam	Won	
Cinema Express Awards	21 December 2002	Best Actress – Tamil	Simran	Won	
Cinema Express Awards	21 December 2002	Best Child Artist	P. S. Keerthana	Won	
Cinema Express Awards	21 December 2002	Best Stunt Director	Vikram Dharma	Won	
Cinema Express Awards	21 December 2002	Best Choreographer	Brindha	Won	
International Tamil Film Awards	31 October 2003	Best Movie	Mani Ratnam (Madras Talkies)	Won	
International Tamil Film Awards	31 October 2003	Best Director	Mani Ratnam	Won	
International Tamil Film Awards	31 October 2003	Best Actress	Simran	Won	
International Tamil Film Awards	31 October 2003	Best Supporting Actor	Prakash Raj	Won	
International Tamil Film Awards	31 October 2003	Best Cinematographer	Ravi K. Chandran	Won	
International Tamil Film Awards	31 October 2003	Best Upcoming Singer	Chinmayi	Won	
Ajanta Fine Arts Awards	2003	Best Female Playback Singer	Chinmayi	Won	
Best Media Associates Awards	2003	Best Female Playback Singer	Chinmayi	Won	
South Indian Cinematographers Association Awards	25 November 2003	Best Cinematographer Award	Ravi K. Chandran	Won	
South Indian Cinematographers Association Awards	25 November 2003	Best Child Artist	P. S. Keerthana	Won	

=== International awards ===
Award	Date of ceremony	Category	Recipient(s)	Result	Ref.
Film Fest New Haven	2004	Special Award – Achievement Award	Mani Ratnam	Won	
Film Fest New Haven	2004	Audience Award – Best Feature Film (International)	Kannathil Muthamittal (Mani Ratnam)	Won	
Film Fest New Haven	2004	Jury Award – Best Feature Film (International)	Kannathil Muthamittal (Mani Ratnam)	Won	
Indian Film Festival of Los Angeles	22 April 2003	Audience Award for Best Picture	Kannathil Muthamittal (Mani Ratnam)	Won	
Jerusalem Film Festival	10–19 July 2003	In Spirit for Freedom Award	Kannathil Muthamittal (Mani Ratnam)	Won	
Zimbabwe International Film Festival	2003	Best Picture	Kannathil Muthamittal (Mani Ratnam)	Won	
RiverRun International Film Festival	2004	Audience Award – Best Feature Film	Kannathil Muthamittal (Mani Ratnam)	Won	
Westchester Film Festival	2004	Best International Film	Kannathil Muthamittal (Mani Ratnam)	Won	
