= Tamil Nadu State Film Award for Best Comedian =

Indian film award

The Tamil Nadu State Film Award for Best Comedian is given by the state government as part of its annual Tamil Nadu State Film Awards for Tamil (Kollywood) films. Vadivelu is the most awarded artist with six wins.

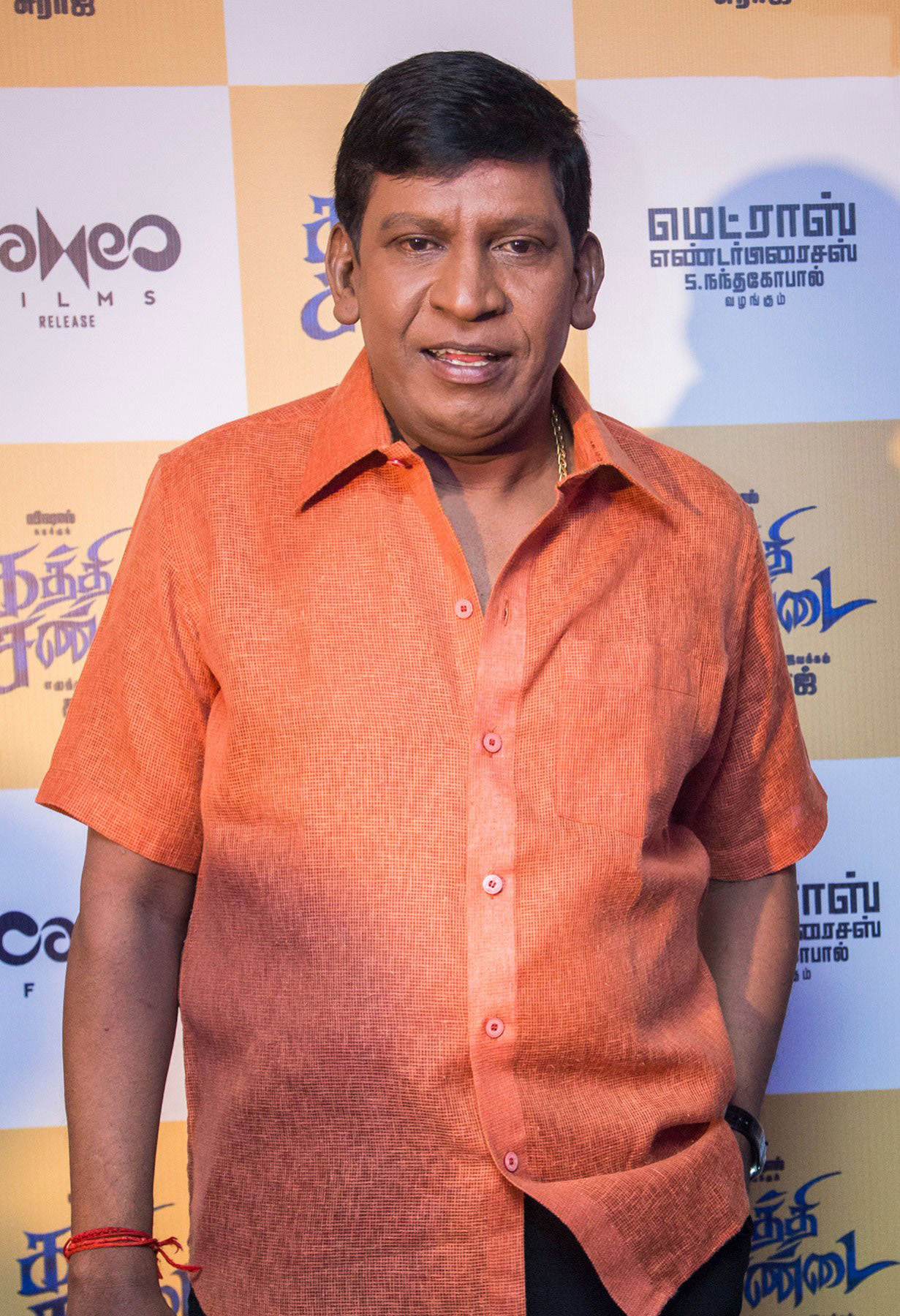
Vadivelu holds the record for the most wins (6)

== Most Wins ==
- 6 Wins : Vadivelu
- 5 Wins : Vivek
- 4 Wins : Kovai Sarala, Devadarshini
- 3 Wins : Manorama
- 2 Wins : Manivannan, Jangiri Madhumitha, Yogi Babu, Robo Shankar

== Winners ==
Here is a list of the award winners and the films for which they won.

Year	Actor	Film
2022	Robo Shankar; Indraja Shankar	Iravin Nizhal; Viruman
2021	Yogi Babu; Jangiri Madhumitha	Doctor; Varisi
2020	Rakshan	Kannum Kannum Kollaiyadithaal
2019	Karunakaran; Kovai Sarala	Monster; Kanchana 3
2018	Yogi Babu; Devadarshini	Mohini; 96
2017	Bala Saravanan; Urvashi	En Aaloda Seruppa Kaanom; Magalir Mattum
2016	Robo Shankar; Jangiri Madhumita	Velainu Vandhutta Vellaikaaran; Kaashmora
2015	Singampuli; Devadarshini	Anjukku Onnu; Thiruttu Kalyanam, 36 Vayadhinile
2014	Singamuthu	Many films
2013	Sathyan	Raja Rani
2012	Soori, Aarthi	Many films Paraseega Mannan
2011	Manobala; Devadarshini	Many films Muni 2: Kanchana
2010	Thambi Ramaiah	Mynaa
2009	Ganja Karuppu	Malayan
2008	Vadivelu, Kovai Sarala	Kathavarayan, Uliyin Osai
2007	Vadivelu, Vivek	Marudhamalai, Sivaji
2006	Vadivelu	Imsai Arasan 23m Pulikesi
2005	Vivek	Anniyan
2004	Mayilsamy; Gandhimathi	Kangalal Kaidhu Sei; Oru Murai Sollividu
2003	Vivek / Devadarshini	Parthiban Kanavu
2002	Vivek	Run
2001	Vadivelu, Kovai Sarala	Thavasi, Poovellam Un Vasam
2000	Vadivelu	Vetri Kodi Kattu
1999	Vivek	Unnaruge Naan Irundhal
1998	Senthil	Jeans
1997	Manivannan	Vidukathai
1996	Vadivelu	Kaalam Maari Pochu
1995	Manivannan; Kovai Sarala	Deva; Sathi Leelavathi
1983	V. K. Ramasamy, Manorama	Paayum Puli
1982	K. A. Thangavelu, Manorama	Manamadurai Malli, Oru Varisu Uruvakiradhu
1981	Suruli Rajan, Manorama	Murattu Kaalai, Ethir Veettu Jannal

== See also ==
- Tamil cinema
- Cinema of India
