= The Dying Gaul (film) =

- Original poster
- Directed by: Craig Lucas
- Screenplay by: Craig Lucas
- Based on: The Dying Gaul by Craig Lucas
- Produced by: Campbell Scott; Paul Manafort
- Starring: Patricia Clarkson; Peter Sarsgaard; Campbell Scott
- Cinematography: Bobby Bukowski
- Edited by: Andy Keir
- Music by: Steve Reich
- Distributed by: Strand Releasing
- Release date: January 2005 (Sundance): November 4, 2005 (United States)
- Running time: 105 minutes
- Country: United States
- Language: English
- Box office: $345,041

The Dying Gaul is a 2005 American drama film written and directed by Craig Lucas, his feature directorial debut. The screenplay is based on his 1998 off-Broadway play of the same name, the title of which was derived from an ancient Roman marble copy of a lost Hellenistic sculpture.

== Plot ==
In 1995 Hollywood, novice screenwriter Robert Sandrich has written an autobiographical script inspired by his lover's death by AIDS-related cerebral tuberculosis. It impresses both studio executive Jeffrey Tishop and his wife Elaine, but for commercial reasons Jeffrey is willing to greenlight the project only if Robert changes his protagonist from Maurice to Maggie and shifts the focus of his plot from gay to straight people. Robert initially refuses to compromise his principles, but when Jeffrey threatens to make the film without his participation, he decides to accept the $1 million paycheck he's been offered and make the requested edits.

Both Jeffrey and Elaine find themselves attracted to Robert, who becomes a frequent guest in their Malibu home and soon drifts into a sexual relationship with the manipulative producer. The connection Elaine feels to the grieving young man is more emotional and cerebral than physical and, after discovering Robert is addicted to Internet chat rooms, she tracks him down online and engages him in conversation while posing as a gay man. Using information he has revealed to her in person, she convinces him that he is communicating with his dead lover. Complications ensue when Robert reveals he's having an affair with Jeffrey, which forces Elaine to face the truth about her seemingly perfect marriage and prompts a confrontation that leads to tragedy.

== Cast ==
- Patricia Clarkson as Elaine Tishop
- Peter Sarsgaard as Robert Sandrich
- Campbell Scott as Jeffrey Tishop
- Elizabeth Marvel as Kelly Cartonis
- Bill Camp as Malcolm

== Release ==
The film premiered at the Sundance Film Festival in January 2005 and was shown at the Miami Gay and Lesbian Film Festival, the Seattle International Film Festival, the Provincetown International Film Festival, the Philadelphia International Gay and Lesbian Film Festival, the Montréal World Film Festival, Film Fest New Haven, the Rio de Janeiro International Film Festival, and the Austin Film Festival before opening in eleven theaters in the United States on November 4, 2005.

== Critical reception ==
On review aggregate website Rotten Tomatoes, The Dying Gaul has an approval rating of 50% based on 70 reviews. The site's critics consensus reads, "Though it has a fine cast, The Dying Gaul's plot feels calculated and too intellectualized."

Stephen Holden of the New York Times called the film "a boldly expressionistic, proudly theatrical film" and wrote that Craig Lucas "makes an auspicious, nervy debut as a screen director."

Roger Ebert of the Chicago Sun-Times thought "there are implausibilities in the plot devices that lead the movie to its ultimate conclusion. And then the final developments themselves, I think, are wrong in both theory and practice. There is some ambiguity about why a final event takes place, and that's all right, but the way in which the movie reveals it is, I think, singularly ineffective. It leads to one of those endings where you sit there wishing they'd tried a little harder to think up something better."

Mick LaSalle of the San Francisco Chronicle observed the film "has the best kind of story in that it unfolds as a series of surprises, and yet every step, twist and turn seems inevitable in retrospect. Just in terms of plot, it's a meticulous piece of construction, with key information gracefully planted and nothing extraneous. On mechanics alone, it would qualify as satisfying entertainment. Yet The Dying Gaul is hardly a mere mechanical construction . . . Lucas' insight into the subtleties of interaction – and the churning depths that those subtleties suggest – is of a whole other order than that of most film directors. In this psychological thriller, the psychological isn't neglected; it's intrinsic."

Peter Travers of Rolling Stone rated the film three out of four stars and commented, "Lucas the director serves Lucas the playwright beautifully, giving the film a seductive gleam that only enhances the shock when he reveals the toxicity underneath. The actors could not be better. Sarsgaard, Scott and the luminous Clarkson negotiate the film's razor-sharp laughs and bone-deep tragedy with resonant skill. Lucas' powerfully haunting film gets under your skin."

In a 2015 interview, Sarsgaard said The Dying Gaul was his favorite film as a performer.

== Awards and nominations ==
Craig Lucas was nominated for the Grand Jury Prize at the Sundance Film Festival. The National Board of Review cited the film for Special Recognition For Excellence In Filmmaking.

== Home media ==
Sony Pictures Home Entertainment released the film on Region 1 DVD on March 21, 2006. It is in anamorphic widescreen format with an audio track and subtitles in English. Bonus features include deleted scenes and an alternate ending.

The Region 2 release has neither the deleted scenes nor the alternative ending.
