= Vaagai Sooda Vaa =

2011 film by A. Sarkunam

- Theatrical release poster
- Directed by: A. Sarkunam
- Written by: Sarkunam
- Produced by: N. Purana Visvanathan
- Starring: Vimal; Ineya; Bhagyaraj; Ponvannan
- Cinematography: Om Prakash
- Edited by: Raja Mohammad
- Music by: Ghibran
- Production company: Village Theatres
- Release date: 30 September 2011
- Running time: 123 minutes
- Country: India
- Language: Tamil

Vaagai Sooda Vaa (transl. Come, wear the crown of victory) is a 2011 Indian Tamil-language historical romance film written and directed by A. Sarkunam. It stars Vimal and Ineya, with Bhagyaraj, Ponvannan and Thambi Ramaiah playing supporting roles. The film set in the 1960s in a remote village in Tamil Nadu. It was released on 30 September 2011 to mostly positive reviews but become an average grosser. The film was subsequently honored with the National Film Award for Best Feature Film in Tamil for 2012.

== Plot ==
The story is set in the 1960s. Veluthambi (Vimal) is a graduate aspiring for a government job. His father Annamalai (Bhagyaraj) advises him to work temporarily for an NGO that helps in educating rural children so that he will be given a priority for a government job. Velu, although uninterested, joins the NGO and gets appointed as a teacher in a small dry village which lacks basic facilities. The entire village works for a rich landlord named JP (Ponvannan), who owns a brick factory. Velu tries to convince the villagers to send their kids to learn, but in vain.

Madhiarasi (Ineya) owns a tea shop in the village with her brother (Dhashwanth) and falls in love with Velu. Also, the village kids play pranks on Velu, which irritates him. Velu understands that the villagers are exploited by JP, owing to their illiteracy by not paying the real wages for their labour. Velu tries to make the villagers understand JP's true colours, but they do not believe him as they see JP as their savior.

Finally, the villagers understand that they are being cheated, and demand proper wages for the bricks made by them. They also realize the value of education and send their kids to learn under Velu. Now, Velu gets a government job but turns down the offer as he prefers to continue working for the NGO, which gives him satisfaction. In a few days, he gets a letter from the NGO, stating that it is closing down due to financial difficulties. Velu worries as he is jobless and decides to work along with villagers in making bricks. The villagers come for the rescue and want him to continue as a teacher for their kids, and in turn, they agree to pay him. Velu also marries Madhi, and the movie ends with him feeling proud that the villagers understood the value of education.

== Cast ==
- Vimal as Veluthambi
- Ineya as Madhiarasi
- Bhagyaraj as Annamalai
- Ponvannan as JP
- Dhashwanth as Madhiarasi's Brother
- Thambi Ramaiah as Twonaalettu (2 × 4 = 8)
- Elango Kumaravel as Kuruvikarrar
- Sathish as Lorry Driver Kavattaiyan
- Soori as Man at theatre shooting M. N. Nambiar
- Thennavan as Dhamo
- Poovitha as Sivagami
- Hello Kandasamy

== Production ==
Shortly after the release of Kalavani, which emerged a sleeper hit, director A. Sarkunam revealed that he had "a couple of scripts in mind" and was discussing with his team on which they should work next, while stating that it "most probably" will not be set in a village again. He started working on his next project in late 2010, which he had titled as Vaagai Sooda Vaa, casting Vimal, who played the lead role in Kalavani, for the lead character again. The film was revealed to be a period piece set in 1966, with Sarkunam describing it as a "romance drama sprinkled with humour", while also stating it would convey a "much-needed" message. Vaagai Sooda Vaa was Sarkunam's first script and his "dream project", which he had wanted to make his directorial debut with, but he had to drop the idea, since no producer was willing to produce a period film with a newcomer in the lead role. He dismissed reports that the film was based on an American film and clarified that it was based on a scheme introduced by the Government in the 1960s.

Vimal was identified to play a young man named Veluthambi, who had finished his PUC and aspires to become a teacher. The lead female role was that of a "tea tender" of the 1960s, a person working at a tea shop. Initially Amala Paul was signed up for the role, much before the release of her critically acclaimed Mynaa. However, Amala, who following the release became much sought-after, was soon ousted from the project, since she started adjusting her dates as per her wishes and refused to take rehearsals first, which Sarkunam did not agree with. She was replaced by a Malayali model-turned-actress Ineya, who had previously appeared in several Malayalam films and the 2011 Tamil film Yuddham Sei under her original name Shruthi. Ineya had been rejected at first, but was later approved by Sarkunam, when she visited his office during a Chennai trip and showed keen interest in the project and the role.

Contrary to what Sarkunam had initially planned, Vaagai Sooda Vaa, too, was a story set in a village. Seenu, an assistant Sabu Cyril, took care of the art direction and erected a set of a village of 1 crore worth, near Aruppukottai. The team had further conducted extensive historical research to create an authentic portrayal of the 1960s. Programmes that were aired on Radio Ceylon, which most people during that time were listening to, were imitated, with mimicry artists being roped in to reproduce the voices of the broadcasters of that time. Cinematographer Om Prakash, who previously worked with the director on Kalavani, shot the film in sepia tone, approaching for a "de-glamorised, dry, de-saturated feel" based on the colors, frames, hues, lighting and ambience to make it more realistic.

== Soundtrack ==
The film's score and soundtrack are scored by debutant M. Ghibran, a friend of Sarkunam. Vaagai Sooda Vaa marks the film debut for Ghibran, who had been composing jingles before. The soundtrack, which was released on 1 July 2011, features 6 songs, with lyrics penned by Vairamuthu, Karthik Netha and Ve. Ramasamy. Ghibran had collaborated with the Lisbon International Symphony Orchestra for one of the songs.

== Release ==
Vaagai Sooda Vaa was released alongside Vishal's Vedi and Cheran's Muran and on 30 September 2011 coinciding with the Dusshera festivities. The film opened in 80–100 screens across Tamil Nadu, and acquired both 50 percent share to distributors and exhibitors, so that it ensures more screens.

=== Critical reception ===
Sify called Vaagai Sooda Vaa a "thought provoking film which is beautiful, complete and laced with social consciousness", further adding that it was a "bittersweet tale of human frailties, a small film with a very big heart and a subtle message". A critic from Times of India gave the film 3.5 out of 5, labelling it a "simple tale, beautifully narrated on screen", while citing that it was a "welcome trip back to the villages and to a time when success wasn't defined by wealth alone". Malathai Rangarajan from The Hindu wrote that the film was not a "run-of-the-mill entertainer, yet it entertains", summarizing it as "poignancy with an ample dose of healthy fun". Anupama Subramanian from Deccan Chronicle gave it 3 out of 5, citing that "though the pace suffers and in many places it gives you a docu-drama feel, Sargunam's intention of making a movie different from the run-of-the mill kind should be lauded".

Chennai Online's reviewer wrote that the film was a "must-watch for those looking for a clean movie sans bloodshed, gory violence and obscene dialogues. The script, cinematography, art work and appreciable performances by the lead actors make it a compelling viewing". A reviewer based at The New Indian Express wrote "From the 'Kalavani' team, one expected an equally delightful and an engaging film. The director's intention to offer something different and off beat is appreciable. But 'Vaagai…' is more like a docu-drama. It documents Velu's life and makes the audience more an objective viewer, than an empathetic part of his journey." Pavithra Srinivasan of Rediff.com also gave a negative review, saying "Vaagai Sooda Vaa may have a few advantages going for it, but it hasn't really capitalised on these strengths. This one is no Kalavani."

=== Awards and nominations ===
Award	Date of ceremony (Note: Date is linked to the article about the awards held that year, wherever possible.)	Category	Recipient(s) and nominee(s)	Result	Ref.
The Chennai Times Film Awards	22 June 2012	Best Lyricist	Vairamuthu for "Sara Sara Saara Kaathu"	Won	
The Chennai Times Film Awards	22 June 2012	Best Female Playback Singer	Chinmayi for "Sara Sara Saara Kaathu"	Won	
Edison Awards	14 February 2012	Best Debut Actress	Ineya	Won	
Filmfare Awards South	7 July 2012	Best Actress – Tamil	Ineya	Nominated	
Filmfare Awards South	7 July 2012	Best Music Director – Tamil	Ghibran	Nominated	
Filmfare Awards South	7 July 2012	Best Female Playback Singer – Tamil	Chinmayi for "Sara Sara Saara Kaathu"	Won	
Filmfare Awards South	7 July 2012	Best Lyricist – Tamil	Vairamuthu for "Sara Sara Saara Kaathu"	Won	
International Tamil Film Awards	3 March 2012	Best Male Playback	Ranjith for "Poraaney Poraney"	Won	
Mirchi Music Awards South	4 August 2012	Best Upcoming Music Director	Ghibran	Won	
Mirchi Music Awards South	4 August 2012	Mannin Kural – Male	Jayamoorthy for "Thanjavuru Maadathi"	Won	
Mirchi Music Awards South	4 August 2012	Mannin Kural – Female	Anitha for "Senga Solla Kaara"	Won	
Mirchi Music Awards South	4 August 2012	Listener's Choice Award − Song	Ghibran for "Sara Sara Saara Kaathu"	Won (4th place)	
Mirchi Music Awards South	4 August 2012	Listener's Choice Award − Album	Vaagai Sooda Vaa	Won (5th place)	
National Film Awards	3 May 2012	Best Feature Film in Tamil	Vaagai Sooda Vaa	Won	
Norway Tamil Film Festival Awards	20–25 April 2011	Best Feature Film	Vaagai Sooda Vaa	Won	
Norway Tamil Film Festival Awards	20–25 April 2011	Best Female Playback Singer	Chinmayi for "Sara Sara Saara Kaathu"	Won	
South Indian International Movie Awards	21–22 June 2012	Best Music Director – Tamil	Ghibran	Nominated	
South Indian International Movie Awards	21–22 June 2012	Best Female Playback Singer – Tamil	Chinmayi for "Sara Sara Saara Kaathu"	Won	
Tamil Nadu State Film Awards	13 July 2017	Best Film	Vaagai Sooda Vaa	Won	
Tamil Nadu State Film Awards	13 July 2017	Best Actor	Vimal	Won	
Tamil Nadu State Film Awards	13 July 2017	Best Actress	Ineya	Won	
Tamil Nadu State Film Awards	13 July 2017	Best Villain	Ponvannan	Won	
Vijay Awards	16 June 2012	Best Film	Vaagai Sooda Vaa	Nominated	
Vijay Awards	16 June 2012	Best Director	A. Sarkunam	Nominated	
Vijay Awards	16 June 2012	Best Actress	Ineya	Nominated	
Vijay Awards	16 June 2012	Best Debut Actress	Ineya	Nominated	
Vijay Awards	16 June 2012	Best Music Director	Ghibran	Nominated	
Vijay Awards	16 June 2012	Best Background Score	Ghibran	Nominated	
Vijay Awards	16 June 2012	Best Female Playback Singer	Chinmayi for "Sara Sara Saara Kaathu"	Won	
Vijay Awards	16 June 2012	Best Lyricist	Vairamuthu for "Sara Sara Saara Kaathu"	Won	
Vijay Awards	16 June 2012	Best Cinematographer	Om Prakash	Nominated	
Vijay Awards	16 June 2012	Best Make Up Artistes	K. P. Sasikumar	Nominated	
Vijay Awards	16 June 2012	Best Art Director	Seenu	Won	
Vijay Awards	16 June 2012	Best Costume Designer	Natarajan	Nominated	
Vijay Awards	16 June 2012	Best Find of the Year	Ghibran	Won	
