= ITFA Best Comedian Award =

The ITFA Best Comedian Award is given by the state government as part of its annual International Tamil Film Awards for Tamil (Kollywood) films.

== The list ==
Here is a list of the award winners and the films for which they won.

Year	Actor	Film
2011	Vivek	Vedi
2008	Vivek	Kuruvi
2007		
2006		
2005		
2004	Vivek	Saamy
2003	Vivek	Run

== See also ==
- Tamil cinema
- Cinema of India
