= Ranja =

- Sinhala: රන්ජා
- Directed by: Sudesh Wasantha Peiris
- Produced by: Sunil T. Films
- Starring: Ranjan Ramanayake; Tennyson Cooray; Himali Siriwardena; Srimal Wedisinghe
- Cinematography: Gamini Moragollagama
- Edited by: Kumarasiri de Silva
- Music by: Keshan Perera, Ayomi Perera
- Production company: Fine Vision
- Distributed by: M.P.I Films; E.A.P Films
- Release date: 28 May 2014
- Country: Sri Lanka
- Language: Sinhala
- Box office: 650 LKR lakhs (21 days)

Ranja (Sinhala: රන්ජා) is a 2014 Sri Lankan Sinhala action thriller film directed by Sudesh Wasantha Peiris and produced by Sunil T. Fernando for Sunil T. Films. It was distributed as the sequel of Ranjan Ramanayake's film One Shot One in 2005. It stars Ramanayake, Tennyson Cooray, and Himali Siriwardena in lead roles along with Roger Seneviratne, Srimal Wedisinghe and Rex Kodippili. It is the 1207th Sri Lankan film in the Sinhala cinema. The movie is a remake of the 2003 Indian Tamil-language movie Dhool.

== Plot ==
Ranja (Ramanayake) along with Vihangi (Himali Siriwardena) and her mother (Nilmini Kottegoda) come to the Colombo city to meet the minister (Srimal Wedisinghe) they've elected to the parliament to hand over a petition about a factory in their village which poisons village river. All three of them stay at Ranja's childhood friend Jonny's (Tennison Cooray) house at Colombo. Meanwhile, a local goon named Swarna (Piumi Boteju) and her brother Kalu Vijay (Wasantha Kumaravila) involved in many illegal activities in the area with the backing of the minister. One day, Vihangi accidentally collides with Kalu Vijay following which he tries to beat her but is saved by Ranja. Ranja and Kalu Vijay get involves in a heated argument which makes Kalu Vijay angry towards Ranja.

== Cast ==
- Ranjan Ramanayake as Ranja / Ranjan
- Tennyson Cooray as Jonny
- Himali Siriwardena as Vihangi
- Srimal Wedisinghe as Minister
- Roger Seneviratne as Sub Inspector
- Wasantha Kumaravila as Kalu Vijay
- Piumi Boteju as Swarna
- Nipuni Wilson as Taniya
- Rex Kodippili as OIC
- Denuwan Senadhi as Tommy
- Nilmini Kottegoda as Aunty
- Sandun Wijesiri as Grama Sevaka
- Sumana Gomes as Shakila
- Premadasa Vithanage as Minister secretary

== Soundtrack ==
No.	Title	Singer(s)	Length
1.	"Salene Lelena Saluwa"	H. R. Jothipala
2.	"Indikara Yara Wandi"	H. R. Jothipala, Angeline Gunathilake, Chandrika Siriwardena

== Awards ==
- Award for the Best Visual Effects - 2014 Derana Film Awards
- Award for the Best Stunt Coordinator - 2014 Derana Film Awards
