= ITFA Best Director Award =

The ITFA Best Director Award is given by the state government as part of its annual International Tamil Film Awards for Tamil (Kollywood) films.

== The list ==
Here is a list of the award winners and the films for which they won.

Year	Director	Film
2012	Venkat Prabhu	Mankatha
2008	K. S. Ravikumar	Dasavathaaram
2007		
2006		
2005		
2004	Bala	Pithamagan
2003	Mani Ratnam	Kannathil Muthamittal

== See also ==
- Tamil cinema
- Cinema of India
