= ITFA Best Supporting Actor Award =

Kollywood film award

The ITFA Best Supporting Actor Award is given by the state government as part of its annual International Tamil Film Awards for Tamil (Kollywood) films.

== The list ==
Here is a list of the award winners and the films for which they won.

Year	Actor	Film
2008	Pasupathy	Kuselan
2004	R. Madhavan	Anbe Sivam
2003	Prakash Raj	Kannathil Muthamittal

== See also ==
- Tamil cinema
- Cinema of India
