= ITFA Best Male Playback Award =

The ITFA Best Male Playback Singer Award is given by the state government as part of its annual International Tamil Film Awards for Tamil (Kollywood) films.

== The list ==
Here is a list of the award winners and the films for which they won.

Year	Singer	Film
2012	Ranjith	Vaagai Sooda Vaa
2008	Srinivas	Onbadhu Roobai Nottu
2007		
2006		
2005		
2004	Karthik	Kaaka Kaaka
2003	Srinivas	Azhagi

== See also ==
- Tamil cinema
- Cinema of India
