= ITFA Best Lyricist Award =

The ITFA Best Lyricist Award is given by the state government as part of its annual International Tamil Film Awards for Tamil (Kollywood) films.

== The list ==
Here is a list of the award winners and the films for which they won.

| Year | Poet | Film |
|---|---|---|
| 2008 | | |
| 2007 | | |
| 2006 | | |
| 2005 | | |
| 2004 | Thamarai | Kaaka Kaaka |
| 2003 | Pa. Vijay | |

== See also ==
- Tamil cinema
- Cinema of India
