= Himali Siriwardena =

Sri Lankan actress and dancer

- Born: Himali Siriwardena; 8 May 1984 (age 42); Sri Lanka
- Occupations: Film, Tele-drama actress, dancer
- Years active: 2005-present
- Website: Facebook page

Himali Siriwardena is a Sri Lankan film and teledrama actress and a dancer by profession.

== Career ==
Siriwardena is a popular dancer in Sri Lanka, before she appeared in cinema and television acting. She has acted in several movies including Suwanda Denuna Jeewithe, King Hunther and commercially successful Ranja. She has also received critical acclaim for her acting on teledramas including Sandagalathenna. Himali also runs her own dancing troupe, 'The Sensations', but it has broken due to many disputes.

In 2017, she appeared in the team Shakyans in a reality show Hiru Mega Stars telecasted by Hiru TV. In 2019, after a brief hiatus, she acted in the comedy television serial Sihina Samagama. In 2021, she appeared as a judge in the dance reality show Hiru Super Dancers.

=== Selected TV serials ===
- Athuru Paara
- Ayal
- Binari
- Dedunnai Adare
- Ehipillamak Yata
- Ingi Bingi
- Dekada Kada
- Sanda Diya Mankada
- Sandagala Thenna
- Sihina Samagama
- Sihineka Thanivela
- Yaya 4

== Filmography ==
Key
†	Denotes films that have not yet been released

Year	Film	Role	Ref.
2005	One Shot	Vijaya's dancer friend	
2006	Sonduru Wasanthe	Kamala	
2010	Suwanda Denuna Jeewithe	Rukshi Siriwardena	
2011	King Hunther	In an Item song	
2013	Raja Horu	Shanika	
2014	Ranja	Vihangi	
2016	Puthandiya	Veena	
2017	Ran Sayura	Maari	
2024	Sihinayaki Adare		
2026	Eda Re	Rukmani Devi	
TBA	Thanapathilage Gedara †		
