= Vivek (actor) =

Indian actor and comedian (1961–2021)

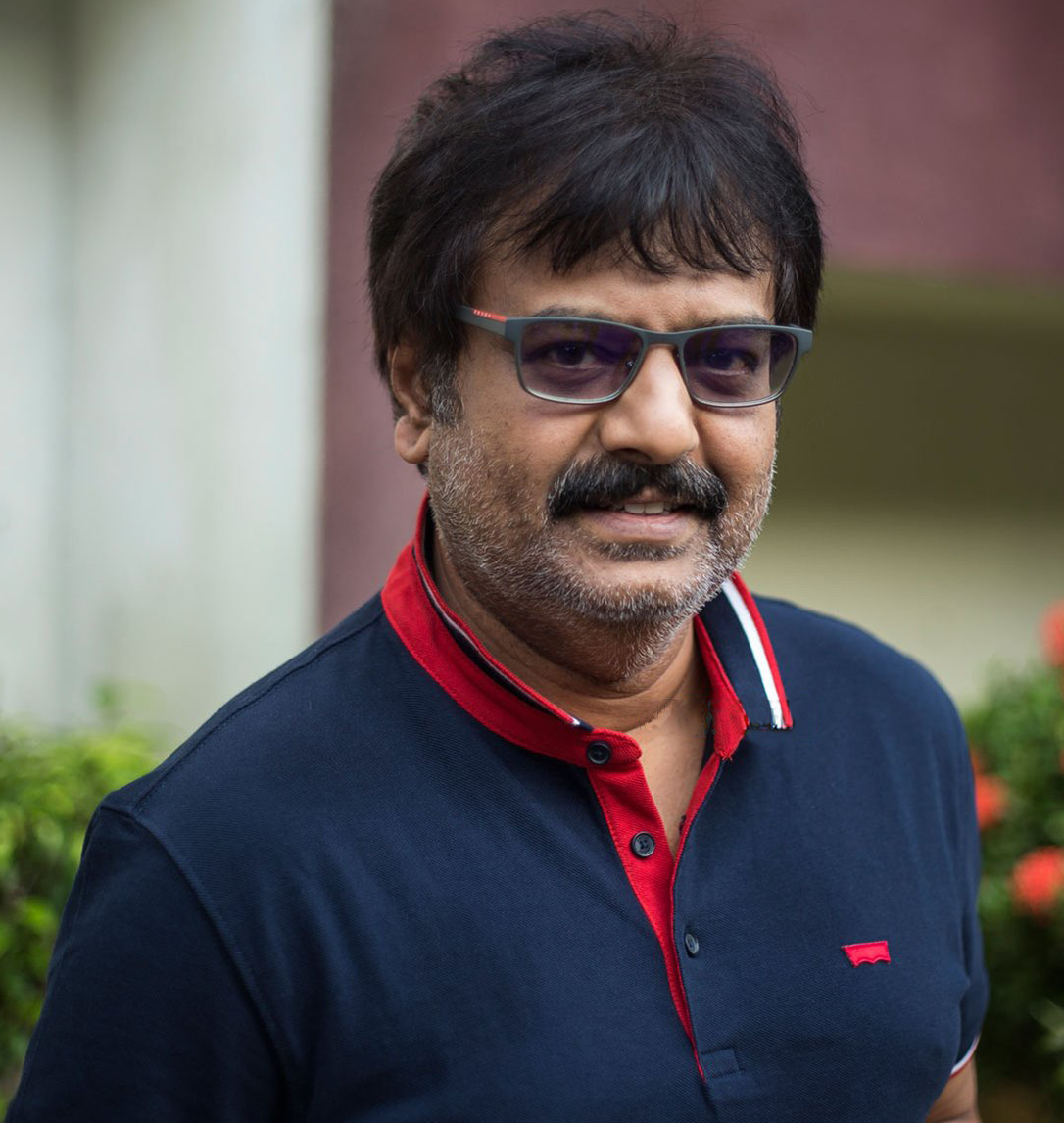
- Vivek in 2019
- Born: A. Vivekanandan; 19 November 1961; Sankarankovil, Tenkasi District, Tamil Nadu, India
- Died: 17 April 2021 (aged 59); Chennai, Tamil Nadu, India
- Education: American College, Madurai
- Occupations: Actor, comedian, television personality, playback singer, lyricist, social activist
- Years active: 1987–2021
- Works: Full list
- Spouse: Arulselvi
- Children: 5
- Awards: Kalaimamani
- Honours: Padma Shri (2009)

A. Vivekanandan (19 November 1961 – 17 April 2021), known professionally as Vivek, was an Indian actor, comedian, television personality, playback singer, social activist, and entertainer who worked in the Tamil film industry. He was introduced in films by director K. Balachander in Manathil Urudhi Vendum (1987)

He has won three Filmfare Award for Best Comedian – Tamil for Run (2002), Saamy (2003), Perazhagan (2004) and five Tamil Nadu State Film Award for Best Comedian for the films, Unnaruge Naan Irundhal (1999), Run (2002), Parthiban Kanavu (2003), Anniyan (2005) and Sivaji (2007).

His comedy style consisted of one-liners and wordplay that featured social and political satire, which led to critics comparing him to N. S. Krishnan and earning him the nickname Chinna Kalaivanar.

In 2009, the Government of India awarded Vivek the Padma Shri award for his contribution to the arts. Sathyabama University conferred Vivek with an honorary doctorate for his contribution to society through cinema. As a television personality, Vivek hosted a number of events and interviewed media personalities, notably A. P. J. Abdul Kalam. Inspired by Kalam's environmentalism, Vivek founded the Green Kalam initiative in 2010 with the mission of planting one billion trees across Tamil Nadu.

== Biography ==
=== Early life ===
Vivek was born as Vivekanandan in the Perunkottur Village near Sankarankovil, Tamil Nadu, India on 19 November 1961. Vivek graduated from The American College in Madurai.

=== Early career (1987–1997) ===
While working at the Secretariat in Chennai, Vivek in his free-time participated at the Madras Humour Club where people would perform stand-up comedy. He helped pioneer the movement to expand and subsequently won the Best Entertainer Award several times during his pantomimes at the club. Vivek subsequently left Chennai and went on to obtain a bachelor's degree in commerce from Madurai and during semester breaks, he would return and perform at the club. P. R. Govindarajan, Founder of Humour Club, introduced him to film director K. Balachandar for the first time and began a professional relationship as a script-writer for the director's films. Vivek revealed that after four years, Balachandar explained a situation and asked him to write a script for sixteen characters, which Vivek completed overnight. He later understood that this was actually a test, and through his performance, Balachandar became closer to Vivek. While assisting with the script for Manathil Uruthi Vendum in 1987, Balachandar offered Vivek an acting role of Suhasini's brother in the film, which he decided to pursue. He began his career portraying supporting roles and collaborated again with Balachandar in Pudhu Pudhu Arthangal (1989) and Oru Veedu Iru Vasal (1990), before often appearing in the primary cast as a friend to the film's lead actor in films such as K. S. Ravikumar's Putham Pudhu Payanam (1991) and Vikraman's Naan Pesa Ninaipathellam (1993). He then also made appearances in Rajinikanth's Uzhaippali and Veera, playing secondary cast roles. Vivek had to wait till 1996 to establish himself as a sole comedian who could help carry the film, and thereafter began to appear in increasingly prominent roles in his ventures.

=== Breakthrough and success (1998–2007) ===
In the late 1990s, Vivek was able to make a breakthrough by appearing as the lead comedian in films, who would often be the main friend of the lead actor and thus his on-screen time began to increase. He worked consecutively on successful films starring Ajith Kumar, appearing as a sidekick in Kaadhal Mannan, Unnai Thedi and Vaalee, and had similar success repeatedly featuring alongside Prashanth in Kannedhirey Thondrinal, Poomagal Oorvalam and Aasaiyil Oru Kaditham. He subsequently became amongst the most busy actors in 2000 and 2001, featuring in over fifty films in two years. Films including Kushi, Priyamanavale and Minnale became blockbusters, while his roles in Mani Ratnam's Alai Payuthey, Mugavaree and Dumm Dumm Dumm all won critical acclaim for the actor. The rising success of Vivek's films had meant that he was featured on film posters on an equivalent scale to the lead actor, and thus helped stuck films find distributors. Telugu films were dubbed into Tamil and released with an additional comedy track featuring the actor such as Kanden Seethaiyai, while devotional films Kottai Mariamman, Palayathu Amman and Nageswari were released with a separate comedy track featuring Vivek. In 2000, director K. Subash had planned a film starring Vivek in the leading role titled Enakkenna Korachal?, however the film never materialised. Similarly in 2001, he began production on a film titled Panju by Rama Narayanan in which he appeared as the protagonist, but the venture was also then shelved as was another film to be directed by Sivachandran.

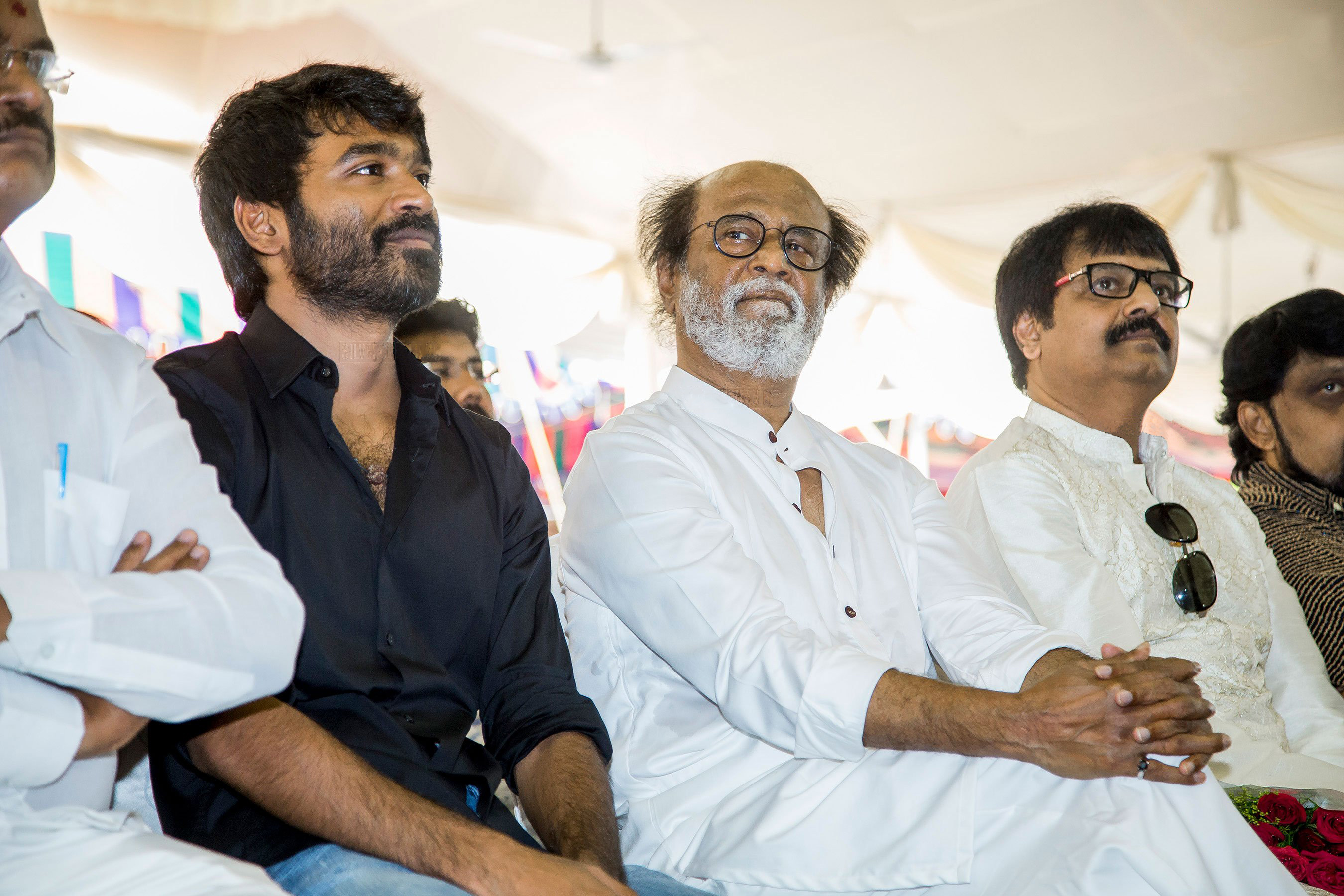
Vivek (far right) at Nerupuda Audio Launch

Vivek worked on more commercially successful ventures in 2002 and 2003, receiving consecutive Filmfare Award for Best Comedian – Tamil and Tamil Nadu State Film Award for Best Comedian for his work in Run. He played extended comedy roles in Vikram's Dhool and Priyadarshan's Lesa Lesa, while winning further acclaim for his portrayal of a teacher in Saamy and a software engineer in Parthiban Kanavu. He then played a marginally more serious role in S. Shankar's coming-of-age tale Boys, portraying a mentor to the group of youngsters, and his performance was well received. Critics noted that "Vivek, for a change, follows Shankar’s script and delivers with his impeccable sense of comic timing", while the reviewer from The Hindu said "the show belongs to Vivek, he's the mouthpiece for the director." Success continued in 2004, where he retained the Filmfare Award for Best Comedian for his role of a marriage assembler in Perazhagan, while his roles in Chellamae and M. Kumaran Son of Mahalakshmi helped contribute to the films' commercial success respectively. His rising profile as an actor meant that he became the first comedian to become an ambassador for the soft drink, securing the sponsorship deal with Mirinda after the brand had carried out market surveys to find a popular promoter. He also made a special exception to appear in a few artistic films and often charged significantly less remuneration for the ventures, notably playing character roles in Janaki Vishwanathan's Kutty (2001) and Thangar Bachan's Azhagi (2002). In the later film, the director had requested Vivek to write and appear in a role himself, in order to use his fame to help the film find a distributor for release.

A film which would feature Vivek in the leading role finally materialised in early 2004 and he completed a project titled Solli Addipean directed by newcomer Ramki. The team worked on the production of the film for close to a year and ensured that the audience would be able to accept the comedian's transformation into a lead role, with actresses Chaya Singh and Tejashree cast as the film's heroines. Despite completion, the film has been stuck since 2004 and as a result of a failure to find a distributor, the film is unlikely to have a theatrical release. Another proposed film where he would play the lead role, Super Subbu by V. C. Guhunathan, also failed to develop after an announcement. In mid 2004, he suffered an injury during the production of a film and took a break from acting assignments for a period of six months.

Vivek returned by portraying a well-received supporting role in Shankar's Anniyan (2005), appearing as an undercover police officer hunting down clues left by a psychopath serial killer. The film opened to critical and commercial success with a critic noting "Vivek's comedy is bankable", and the actor subsequently went on to win the State Award for Best Comedian for his work on the venture. He continued his comeback with appearances in Vijay's Aathi, Ajith Kumar's Paramasivan and Silambarasan's Saravana, all of which released on the same day in January 2006. After winning acclaim for his performance as a comedic undercover detective in Susi Ganesan's Thiruttu Payale, Shankar approached him to feature in a prominent role in his venture Sivaji (2007), starring Rajinikanth, which would go on to become the most expensive Tamil film made at release. Vivek allotted ninety days for the film, significantly more than any of his previous films, and his performance as Rajinikanth's sidekick Arivu won him another award from the state for Best Comedian. He won positive reviews from critics for his performance, with reviewers noting his "one-liners are really whacky and hilarious" and that "Vivek must come in for special mention for his performance".

=== Later work (2008–2021) ===
In the late 2000s, Vivek's market reach began to falter as a result of changes in screenplay in Tamil cinema, which saw fewer films adopting a separate comedy track. Moreover, the lack of big budget films signed by the actor and the emergence of Santhanam, saw Vivek reach a nadir in 2012, where he only had a single release. His acclaimed work during the period involved a portrayal of a don in Padikathavan (2009), an appearance in drag in Guru En Aalu (2009) and as a police officer in the Singam (2010) series. Re-emerging after a sabbatical, Vivek announced his plans to move away from his usual comedy roles after being advised by director Bala and Kamal Haasan and signed for a film titled Naan Than Bala (2014), in which he played a serious role. Simultaneously he began work on another film as the lead actor in Palakkattu Madhavan (2015) opposite Sonia Agarwal, while appearing in another parallel lead role with Karunas in Sakthi Chidambaram's unreleased Machan. After his return, Vivek collaborated with film makers to appear again in bigger budget films and worked on Velraj's Velaiyilla Pattathari (2014), Gautham Vasudev Menon's Yennai Arindhaal (2015), Aishwarya Dhanush's Vai Raja Vai (2015).

After that Vivek appeared in Vamshi P.'s movie Thozha (2016), which starred Karthi. Vivek notably starred as himself in Radha Mohan's comedy drama film Brindavanam (2017), which explored his friendship with a deaf and dumb fan. The film and Vivek garnered critical acclaim, with a reviewer noting the actor is in "good form" and "completely steals the limelight". In 2019, he appeared as retired cop who heads to live in Seattle in the thriller film Vellai Pookkal, and won positive reviews for his portrayal of a serious character. A reviewer noted "despite seeming a bit awkward in certain scenes, the actor pulls it off thanks to his persistence", while another critic stated Vivek delivers his role in a "believable and convincing manner". His last film before his death was Dharala Prabhu (2020), in which he starred alongside Harish Kalyan. His first posthumous appearance was Aranmanai 3 in 2021. He has also played a supporting role in The Legend, Yaadhum Oore Yaavarum Kelir, Indian 2.

Vivek's unprecedented death during the middle of the principal photography of Indian 2 meant that the remaining portions involving Vivek had to be wrapped up by bringing on board another person resembling similar to Vivek and as a result the director of the film S. Shankar roped in Kovai Babu as a like-to-like replacement. Kovai Babu eventually completed his film portions in Indian 2 by acting as a body double for late actor Vivek. Vivek's scenes were completed with Kovai Babu being the body double and his face digitally morphed to resemble Vivek. Due to Vivek's deaths before production of Indian 2 could be completed, Shankar decided to use visual effects to complete his remaining scenes.

Through his career, he had acted in over 222 films.

== Personal life ==
Vivek married Arulselvi, with whom he had five children: Amritha Nandini, Tejaswini, Prasanna Kumar, Prashanthini, and Prathana. Prasanna Kumar died in 2015, aged 13, due to complications arising from meningitis. Prashanthini and Prathana are twins who were born in 2017 His friend Cell Murugan was his frequent co star.

== Death and state funeral ==
On 16 April 2021, Vivek experienced breathlessness and chest pain and was admitted to a SIMS Hospital in Chennai after falling unconscious at home. Doctors deemed him critical and discovered that he had a thrombosis with 100% blockage in the left anterior descending artery, which caused congestive heart failure. Following an angioplasty, he died in hospital on 17 April 2021 at the age of 59. He was given a state funeral amidst large crowds near his residence in Virugambakkam, Chennai. A day prior to the attack, Vivek received Bharat Biotech's Covaxin and campaigned for vaccination against COVID-19. This led to speculation that his death may be linked to the vaccine, however the National Human Rights Commission ruled out any link between the vaccine and his heart attack, and instead related to hypertension. Vivek's funeral took place in Chennai with full state honours.

== Honorary street name ==
The Greater Chennai Corporation has renamed the street where Vivek lived as "Chinna Kalaivanar Vivek Road."

== Social activism ==
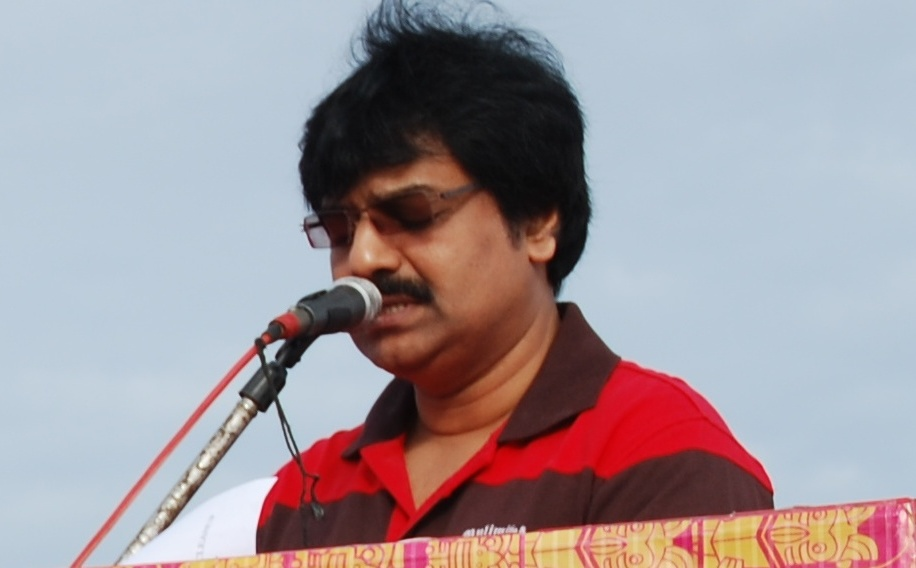
Vivek at International Coastal Clean Up, 2011

=== Green Kalam ===
In 2010, Vivek launched Green Kalam, a project to plant trees across India inspired by former President of India A. P. J. Abdul Kalam. Through Twitter, he mobilized volunteers, particularly from schools and colleges, to join the initiative. Kalam insisted the project should not be named after him, after which Vivek briefly changed its name to Green Globe. As of his death, over 3,300,000 saplings had been planted.

=== Other initiatives ===
Vivek, along with actors Suriya, Jyothika and Karthi, had been appointed an ambassador for the Plastic Pollution Free Tamil Nadu campaign by the state's government under the leadership of Chief Minister Edappadi K. Palaniswami in 2018.

== Brand endorsement ==
He was the brand ambassador of Mirinda soft drinks in 2003 and Nathella Jewellery in 2011.

== Awards and honours ==
=== Civilian honours ===
No.	Image	Ribbon	Decoration	Field	Conferred date	Conferred by	Presenter	Ref.
1			Padma Shri (Fourth Highest Civilian Award of India)	Art	15 April 2009	Government of India	Pratibha Devisingh Patil	

Year	Event	Category/Award	Movie	Result	Source
2015	Sathyabama University	Honorary Doctorate			
2006	Tamil Nadu State Film Honorary Award	Kalaivanar Award for his contributions to Tamil Cinema			
2002	Filmfare Awards South	Best Comedian – Tamil	Run	Won	
2003	Filmfare Awards South	Best Comedian – Tamil	Saamy	Won	
2004	Filmfare Awards South	Best Comedian – Tamil	Perazhagan	Won	
1999	Tamil Nadu State film Awards	Best Comedian	Unnaruge Naan Irundhal	Won	
2002	Tamil Nadu State film Awards	Best Comedian	Run	Won	
2003	Tamil Nadu State film Awards	Best Comedian	Parthiban Kanavu	Won	
2005	Tamil Nadu State film Awards	Best Comedian	Anniyan	Won	
2007	Tamil Nadu State film Awards	Best Comedian	Sivaji: The Boss	Won	
2003	International Tamil Film Award	Best Comedian	Run	Won	
2004	International Tamil Film Award	Best Comedian	Saamy	Won	
2008	International Tamil Film Award	Best Comedian	Kuruvi	Won	
2011	International Tamil Film Award	Best Comedian	Vedi	Won	
2009	Asianet Film Awards	Honour Special Jury Award			
2009	Asianet Film Awards	Asianet Film Award for Best Comedian	Various Films		
2007	Edison Awards	Best Comedian	Guru En Aalu		
2021	South Indian International Movie Awards	Best Comedian - Tamil	Dharala Prabhu		
