= Ma Chu Ka =

2017 Indian Malayalam psychological thriller film

- Promotional poster
- Directed by: Jayan Vannery
- Written by: Jijumon
- Produced by: Rajeesh Kulirma
- Starring: Pasupathy; Janani Iyer
- Cinematography: Jomon Thomas
- Edited by: Vijay Shankar
- Music by: Gopi Sundar
- Production company: Manikkoth Productions
- Release date: 9 June 2017
- Country: India
- Languages: Malayalam; Tamil

Ma Chu Ka is a 2017 Indian Malayalam-Tamil psychological thriller film directed by Jayan Vannery and stars Pasupathy and Janani Iyer in the lead role. The film is produced by Rajesh Kulirma under the banner of Manikkoth Productions. Much of the film's dialogue is in Tamil because Pasupathy plays a Tamilian. The Tamil dubbed version is titled as Ma Si Ka.

== Plot ==
Ma Chu Ka discusses about the unpredictability of human life. It revolves around two people and showcases the events on a day.

== Cast ==
- Janani Iyer as Nivedita Hariharan
- Pasupathy as Arivazhagan a.k.a. Arivu

== Production ==
The film began production in 2015. The film notably only features two characters onscreen with the other characters appearing in voice roles. Janani Iyer plays a bold journalist with no care about the consequences her daring actions will bring. Iyer said, “It was tough as I had to speak a lot of Malayalam dialogues. I had to do my homework to get the lines right”. Actor Pasupathy was cast in the role of a Tamilian as the director felt no Malayalam actor could do justice to the subtle character. The film was shot in Kodaikanal for twenty days for twelve hours per day.

== Soundtrack ==
The music was composed by Gopi Sundar. A critic from Music Aloud wrote that "Ma Chu Ka (no clue what the name is supposed to imply). Short and middling soundtrack from Gopi Sunder".

All lyrics are written by BK Harinarayanan.

Track listing
No.	Title	Singer(s)	Length
1.	"Maanasam"	Najim Arshad	2:51
2.	"Paambum Koneem"	Gopi Sundar	3:56
3.	"Neeyen Sayahna Swapnathil"	Gopi Sundar	4:43
Total length:			11:30

== Reception ==
Santhosh Aechikkanam of Mathrubhumi wrote that "Jayan Vannery be proud of the fact as a novice he has found success in it. The extraordinary handling shown by the director in the screenplay is also commendable. Jomon Thomas's cinematography, Gopi Sundar's music and Prathap Raveendran's art direction have played an important role in expressing the concept put forward by the director in this film with the same intensity". A critic from Nowrunning rated the film three out of five stars and wrote that "Sometimes eerie, and always mysterious, Ma Chu Ka is strictly for genuine movie lovers for a serious appreciation".
