= Pasupathy =

Indian actor

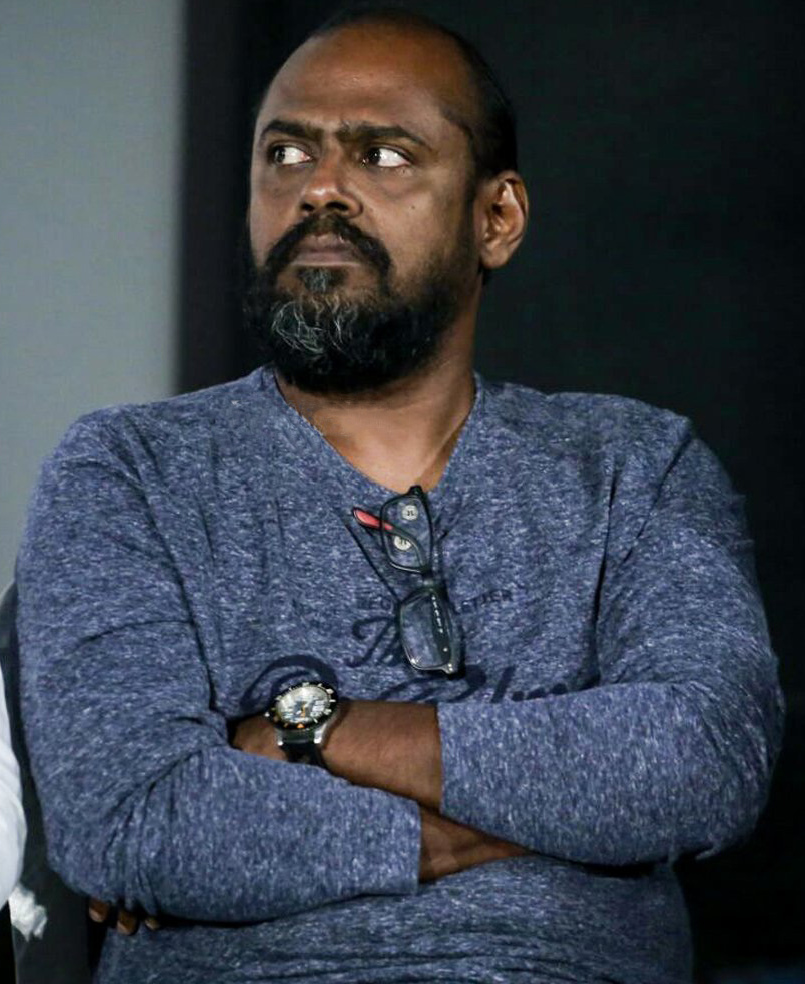
- Pasupathy at Anjala Audio Launch
- Born: Pasupathy Masilamani; 5 September 1967 (age 59); Pozhichalur, Madras, Madras State (now Chennai, Tamil Nadu), India
- Occupation: Actor
- Years active: 1999–present
- Spouse: Surya
- Children: 1

Pasupathy (born 5 Sep 1967) is an Indian actor. He appeared in critically acclaimed roles in many noted films in Tamil cinema, playing supporting, antagonistic, comedic as well as protagonistic roles. He has won a Tamil Nadu State Film Award and Two Filmfare Awards South.

His performance in E (2006) earned him a Filmfare Award for Best Supporting Actor and a Tamil Nadu State Film Award for Best Villain. He also won an ITFA Best Supporting Actor Award for his role in Kuselan (2008). He has also appeared in Malayalam, Telugu, and Kannada films.

== Early life ==
Pasupathy Masilamani was born on 5 Sep1967 to Ramasamy Aarsuthiyaar at Vannandurai, a southern neighbourhood Chennai, India in a Kallar (Thevar) family. In 1984, he joined the Chennai-based theatre group "Koothu-P-Pattarai" where he was there till 1997. He studied and grew up there till he started to act in films. He became friends with actor Nassar who was in the film institute and later joined the Koothu-P-Pattarai. Thirumangalakottai in Thanjavur, a village from which their family originates.

== Career ==
Pasupathy started his career as a radio jockey and a newsreader. He also acted in many television serials before entering the film industry. Pasupathy made his debut with House Full in 1999. This was a Tamil action thriller directed by R. Parthiban. In this film he played the role of a corrupt cop.

When he was working in Marudhanayagam, Nassar asked him whether he was interested in films. Pasupathy was then introduced to Kamal Haasan and he was given the villain role in Marudhanayagam. Pasupathy stated "That was the first time I was before the camera". Marudhanayagam was shelved and Nasser's Mayan which he was also part of was his first release.

Pasupathy plays an LTTE commander in Mani Ratnam directorial Kannathil Muthamittal (2002). He got his first major recognised role in Virumaandi (2004). He later began appearing in negative roles in a number of films such as Sullan (2004), Madhurey (2004) and Thirupaachi (2005). He later branched out into comedy with Mumbai Xpress (2005) and Majaa (2005). His first lead role was in the National Film Award winning film Veyyil (2006).

Pasupathy has indeed made an impression in Malayalam with his earlier roles in films like Big B (2007) and Vairam: Fight For Justice (2009). After a break he returns to Mollywood playing the lead for the movie No. 66 Madhura Bus (2012).

He further played lead roles in Raman Thediya Seethai (2008), in which he appeared as a blind radio jockey, and Kuselan in which he was seen as a village barber. In Aravaan (2012), a period-based action drama, he played Kombhoodhi, the warrior head of a village in the 18th century, for which he had trained at the gym for six months. He appeared in different roles in many hit films. His performances in supporting characters, mostly as an antagonist, were appreciated most of the time by the audiences.

He acted in an independent English film called The Last Vision (2012), made by youngsters from Kerala for festivals. His role in the 2013 Tamil film Idharkuthane Aasaipattai Balakumara won critical accolades. In 2014, Pasupathy played Aditya Karikalan in a theatrical adaptation of Ponniyin Selvan. He playing the role of a lawyer in the bilingual psychological thriller Ma Chu Ka (2017). He has joined Vetrimaaran’s Asuran in 2019.

In the sports action film Sarpatta Parambarai (2021), Pasupathy takes on the role of Rangan, a boxing instructor who runs a clan. Pasupathy's character is a seasoned coach and a former boxer who mentors the protagonist. Pasupathy's portrayal received praise for the authenticity and depth, he brought to the character. He acted in the lead role as constable in the comedy drama Thandatti (2023). He was cast in the supporting role in Pa. Ranjith's Thangalaan (2024). Pasupathy plays Veeran in the Telugu epic science fiction Kalki 2898 AD (2024).

== Filmography ==
=== Tamil films ===
†	Denotes films that have not yet been released

Year	Film	Role	Notes
1999	House Full	Corrupt cop	Uncredited
2001	Maayan	Dominic Raj	
2002	Kannathil Muthamittal	Pasupathy	
2003	Dhool	Aathi	
2003	Iyarkai	Father Stephen	
2004	Virumaandi	Kothalathdevar	
2004	Arul	Gajapathy	
2004	Machi	Narayanan	
2004	Sullan	Soori	
2004	Madhurey	K. T. R.	
2005	Thirupaachi	Pattasu Balu	
2005	Mumbai Xpress	Chidambaram	
2005	Majaa	Aadhi	
2006	Veyil	Murugesan	
2006	E	Nellai Mani	Filmfare Award for Best Supporting Actor; Tamil Nadu State Film Award for Best Villain
2007	Manikanda		
2008	Raman Thediya Seethai	Nedumaran	
2008	Kuselan	Balakrishnan	ITFA Best Supporting Actor Award
2009	TN-07 AL 4777	Mani	
2009	Vedigundu Murugesan	Murugesan	
2012	Aravaan	Komputhi	
2013	Idharkuthane Aasaipattai Balakumara	Annachi	
2014	Nee Enge En Anbe	Ajmad Ali Khan	
2014	Mosakutty		
2015	India Pakistan	Kaattamuthu	
2015	Yagavarayinum Naa Kaakka	Kasimedu Deva	
2015	10 Enradhukulla	Das	
2016	Anjala	Muthirulandi	
2017	Nagarvalam		Guest appearance
2017	Karuppan	Mayee	
2017	Kodiveeran	Villangam Vellaikkaran	
2019	Vennila Kabaddi Kuzhu 2	Saamy	
2019	Asuran	Murugesan	
2021	Sarpatta Parambarai	Rangan Vaathiyar	Filmfare Award for Best Supporting Actor
2022	Sakunthalavin Kadhalan		
2023	Thandatti	Subramani	
2024	Thangalaan	Gengupattar	
2025	Bison Kaalamaadan	Velusamy	

=== Other language films ===
Year	Film	Role	Language	Notes
2003	Veede	Swarnakka's younger brother	Telugu	
2004	Nenunnanu	JP's Henchman	Telugu	
2005	Sye	Inspector Mosale	Kannada	
2007	Big B	Balaji Sakthivel	Malayalam	
2009	Vairam: Fight For Justice	Sivarajan	Malayalam	
2012	Outsider	Komban Lawrence	Malayalam	
2012	No. 66 Madhura Bus	Varadarajan	Malayalam	
2012	The Last Vision		English	
2014	Anaamika	Ajmad Ali Khan	Telugu	
2016	Malupu	Kasimedu Deva	Telugu	
2016	Oozham	Captain	Malayalam	
2017	Ma Chu Ka	Arivazhakan	Malayalam	Bilingual film
2018	Kinar	Shakthivel	Malayalam	
2021	Raja Vikramarka	Guru Narayan	Telugu	
2024	Kalki 2898 AD	Veeran	Telugu	

=== Theatre ===
Year	Film	Role	Language	Notes
2014	Ponniyin Selvan	Aditya Karikalan	Tamil	

=== Streaming television ===
Year	Title	Role(s)	Language	OTT Platform	Notes	Ref.
2021	November Story	Kulandhai Yesu	Tamil	Disney+ Hotstar	Debut Web Series	
2023	Dhootha	Konidela Sathya Murthy	Telugu	Amazon Prime Video		
2024	Bujji and Bhairava	Veeran	Telugu	Amazon Prime Video		
2025	Kuttram Purindhavan: The Guilty One	Bhaskar	Tamil	SonyLIV		

Awards
Filmfare Awards South
Preceded by Rajkiran for Thavamai Thavamirundhu	Best Supporting Actor for E 2006	Succeeded by Saravanan for Paruthiveeran
