= King Hunther =

2011 Sri Lankan comedy film

- Sinhala: කිං හන්තර්
- Directed by: Jayaprakash Sivagurunathan
- Written by: Mahesh Rathsara Madduma Arachchi
- Produced by: Alankulama Films
- Starring: Vijaya Nandasiri; Anarkali Akarsha; Sanath Gunathilake
- Cinematography: Ruwan Costa
- Edited by: Ajith Ramanayake
- Music by: Mahesh Denipitiya; Jananath Warakagoda
- Distributed by: EAP Theatres
- Release date: 27 May 2011
- Running time: 118 minutes
- Country: Sri Lanka
- Language: Sinhala

King Hunther (Sinhala: කිං හන්තර්) is a 2011 Sri Lankan Sinhala comedy film directed by Jayaprakash Sivagurunathan and produced by Dhammika Siriwardena for Alankulama Films. It stars Vijaya Nandasiri, Anarkali Akarsha and Mahendra Perera in lead roles along with Kumara Thirimadura and Anarkali Akarsha. Music co-composed by Mahesh Denipitiya and Jananath Warakagoda. It is the 1158th Sri Lankan film in the Sinhala cinema.

The film successfully completed fifty days of screening.

== Plot ==
The film takes place where an ancient King Hunther (Vijaya) was awaken by a hundred years sleep and started to modernize to present day world. He finally became a minister with the help of his present day friends Hector (Mahendra) and Moreen (Anarkali).

== Cast ==
- Vijaya Nandasiri as King Hunter / Ahethuka
- Anarkali Akarsha as Moreen
- Mahendra Perera as Hector
- Kumara Thirimadura as Minister Meththananda
- Giriraj Kaushalya as Benja
- Semini Iddamalgoda as Minister's wife Neetha
- Sanath Gunathilake as Nayakathuma
- Janith Wickramage as Chamika
- Denuwan Senadhi as Hiru
- Himali Siriwardena in item song
- Richard Manamudali
- Dayasiri Hettiarachchi
- Nethalie Nanayakkara

== Soundtrack ==
No.	Title	Length
1.	"Nidahase Galana Gagulak Wage"
2.	"Kusum Wasi Wasee"
