= Outsider (2012 film) =

- Theatrical poster
- Directed by: Premlal
- Written by: Premlal
- Produced by: Gireesh
- Starring: Sreenivasan; Indrajith; Ganga Babu; Pasupathy
- Cinematography: Premlal
- Music by: Sangeeth
- Production company: Gowry Meenakshi Movies
- Release date: 30 March 2012
- Country: India
- Language: Malayalam

Outsider is a 2012 Malayalam thriller film written and directed by Premlal, starring Sreenivasan, Indrajith, Ganga Babu and Pasupathy in the lead roles. It is produced by Gireesh under the banner of Gowri Meenakshi Movies, and is shot in Chalakudy in Kerala and Nagercoil in Tamil Nadu.

== Synopsis ==
The film is about an ordinary middle-class man whose life turns upside down when a criminal tries to control him. It's about his struggles and how he comes to terms with his life.

== Cast ==
- Sreenivasan as Sivankutty
- Indrajith as Mukundan
- Pasupathy as Komban Lawrence (main antagonist)
- Ganga Babu as Manju
- Sai Kumar as Balagopalan
- Joju George as Santhosh

== Production ==
The film, produced under the banner of Gowry Meenakshi Movies, was launched on 2 January 2012, and principal production also started on the same day in and around Chalakudy in Kerala. Outsider was the first Malayalam film to start production in 2012. The shooting will later shift to Nagercoil.

Outsider is Premlal's second directorial venture. His debut film, Aathmakatha (2010), a drama which also starred Sreenivasan in the lead, was a critical success and went on to win many a laurels. It was screened at a number of international film festivals in India and abroad. According to Premlal, Outsider is tagged as an emotional action thriller in Malayalam.

Sreenivasan and Indrajith come together for the first time in Outsider, which tells the tale of revenge. Ganga Babu, who is making her debut as a lead actress in Malayalam cinema, is the female lead in the film. The actress was there as a child artiste in Nivedyam. Tamil actor Pasupathy, who has earlier acted in Malayalam movies, is playing the main antagonist in the film.

== Reception ==
Unlike Premlal's previous work, Outsider received mixed reviews.

- The Times of India said, "The thread of Outsider teems with so many possibilities, which could have easily been converted into a fine narrative."
- The Hindu, said that the film "lacks novelty or punch".
- Rediff.com commented that "Outsider is a confused effort as it falls somewhere between a thriller and an emotional tale."
