= Thandatti =

2023 Indian film

- Theatrical release poster
- Directed by: Ram Sangaiah
- Written by: Ram Sangaiah
- Produced by: S. Lakshman Kumar; Venkatesh
- Starring: Pasupathy; Rohini; Vivek Prasanna; Ammu Abhirami
- Cinematography: Mahesh Muthuswami
- Edited by: T. Shivanandeeswaran
- Music by: Songs: K. S. Sundaramoorthy; Score: Sam C. S.
- Production company: Prince Pictures
- Distributed by: AV MEDIA Consultancy (Karnataka)
- Release date: 23 June 2023
- Country: India
- Language: Tamil

Thandatti is a 2023 Indian Tamil-language comedy drama film written and directed by Ram Sangaiah in his directorial debut. It stars Pasupathy, Rohini, Vivek Prasanna and Ammu Abhirami. The film was produced by Prince Pictures and has songs composed by K. S. Sundaramoorthy, while Sam C. S. composed the background score.

The story of the film revolves around an old woman's Thandatti, which goes missing during her funeral procession. The film was released theatrically on 23 June 2023. It received positive reviews from critics.

== Plot ==
The film begins with a police operation, where Constable Subramani, known for his hasty decisions, shoots a criminal when he tries to escape, earning the wrath of his superiors.

One day, a dishevelled young man named Selvarasu arrives at the police station from a village named Kidaripatti, asking for help with his grandmother Thangaponnu's disappearance. While the other officers are reluctant about helping Selvarasu due to bad experiences with the villagers, Subramani volunteers to take up the case. While Selvarasu and Subramani search for Thangaponnu, the former reflects on fond memories about Thangaponnu and how her daughters are stealthily usurping all her wealth, property and jewellery. Now all that she is left with is her solid gold ear piece, called "thandatti", towards which Thangaponnu has an emotional attachment. We see that in her young age, Thangaponnu eloped with a man called Veera from a different community, and he had gifted her the thandatti. As the two are having an emotional moment, Thangaponnu's brother barges in with his men and attacks them, killing Veera. Thangaponnu is taken back home, forcibly married to another man without her consent and shown to have lived with Veera's memories all her life and has safeguarded her precious thandatti.

In the present, Subramani manages to find a weak Thangaponnu on the roadside and admits her to a hospital, where she dies. Selvarasu is heartbroken, and coaxes Subramani to accompany him to their village, so that Thangaponnu's children do not create ruckus till her funeral is over. At the village, Subramani realizes that Thangaponnu's daughters and her alcoholic son are only focused on how to usurp her last piece of belonging, the thandatti. While the whole village is paying their last respects to Thangaponnu, the thandatti suddenly goes missing overnight. A huge fight ensues with all the daughters and son's families blaming each other for the theft, and Subramani is left with a mammoth task to fend for himself and calm down the crowd, as well as to find the missing thandatti. With bits and pieces of clues from witnesses in the village, Subramani runs from pillar to post, but to no avail.

In the midst of all the commotion, an officer from a life insurance company arrives as a saving grace, and reveals that Thangaponnu's policy has matured, thereby releasing a large sum of money to be shared among all her children. They are overjoyed by this information and momentarily forget the missing thandatti, since it is not of much value when compared to the insurance money. Subramani is disgusted by their attitude. As the mourners decides to proceed with the cremation, a casteist man who takes pride in honour killings from the neighbouring village arrives and threatens to wreak havoc on Thangaponnu's funeral procession, since she helped his daughter elope with a man from a different community. Subramani thrashes him and his men in rage with the whole village witnessesing this. They now have a new found respect and reverence for Subramani, whom they have seen as demure until then. Subramani then leads the funeral procession peacefully, and Thangaponnu is finally cremated.

When all the villagers leave, Subramani stands alone at the funeral pyre. It is revealed that it was he who had the thandatti the entire time it was missing. When he met Thangaponnu in her weak state just before her death and tries to talk sense to her about returning home, she realizes that Subramani is her long lost love Veera (Veera Subramani), who was presumed dead. They share a brief conversation reminiscing about their lives. Thangaponnu has been covertly helping couples elope, so they did not have to face an awful fate like she and Subramani did. Subramani tells Thangaponnu that he never married again and has been living with just the memories from their past. After Thangaponnu's death, he remembers her wish to be cremated with the thandatti, and has hence stolen it from the prying eyes of her children. He throws the thandatti into the burning pyre along with Thangaponnu, thus fulfilling her wish.

== Cast ==
- Pasupathy as Constable Veera Subramani
  - Dinesh Ravi as young Veera Subramani
- Rohini as Thangaponnu "Thangam"
  - Ammu Abhirami as young Thangaponnu
- Vivek Prasanna as Show Pandi, Thangaponnu's alcoholic son
- Poovitha as Chinnatha, Thangaponnu's daughter
- Mandela Mukesh as Selvarasu, Thangaponnu's grandsons
- Deepa Shankar as Ponnatha, Thangaponnu's daughter
- Janaki as Poovatha, Thangaponnu's daughter
- Semmalar Annam as Virumayi, Thangaponnu's daughter
- Sugunthan as Muthuraasu, Virumayi’s husband
- Cheran Raj as Thirunavukaarasu
- Vetrivel Raja

== Production ==
The film was produced by S. Lakshman Kumar under Prince Pictures, while it was co-produced by Venkatesh. The cinematography was done by Mahesh Muthuswami and edited by Shivanandeeswaran.

== Music ==
Thandatti

Soundtrack album by K. S. Sundaramoorthy Background Score: Sam C. S.
- Released: 2023
- Genre: Feature film soundtrack
- Length: 8:58
- Language: Tamil
- Producers: K. S. Sundaramoorthy; Background Score: Sam C. S.

Sam C. S. chronology
Thiruvin Kural (2023)	Thandatti (2023)	Nene Naa (2023)

K. S. Sundaramoorthy chronology
Bommai Nayagi (2023)	Thandatti (2023)	Rangoli (2023)

Singles from Thandatti
- 1. "Thalayyaatti Pesurappo" Released: 9 June 2023

The songs were composed by K. S. Sundaramoorthy, while Sam C. S. composed the background score.

Track listing
No.	Title	Lyrics	Singer(s)	Length
1.	"Thalayyaatti Pesurappo"	Yegathasi	R. Guru Ayya Durai	3:31
2.	"Kaaki Paya Kalanga"	Ram Sangaiah	Meenakshi Illayaraja, Udhay Kannan	3:19
3.	"Ai Irandu Thingalai"	Pattinathar	Mukesh	2:08
Total length:				8:58

== Release ==
The film was released on 23 June 2023.

=== Home media ===
The OTT rights to the film were sold to Amazon Prime Video.

== Reception ==
Chandhini R of Cinema Express gave it 2.5 out of 5 stars and wrote, "Though the execution could seem all over the place, it certainly has the heart in the right place." Logesh Balachandran of The Times of India gave it 3 out of 5 stars and wrote, "Thandatti is a fairly engaging watch — inventive and, at the same time, overly ambitious." Gopinath Rajendran of The Hindu wrote, "Despite the film being far from perfect because of inconsistent writing, the few scenes that work do so perfectly."

A critic from Vikatan gave the film a mixed review, stating, "Thandatti could have been better if there were no flaws." A critic from Dinamalar gave the film 3 out of 5 stars and wrote, "The second half of the film seemed slow-paced, and some scenes were a bit melodramatic. If those problems had been fixed, the film might have been better."

A critic from Maalai Malar gave it a positive review, noting that "Thandatti shines".
