= Filmfare Award for Best Comedian – Tamil =

Former Indian annual film award

The Filmfare Best Comedien Award – Tamil was given by the Filmfare magazine as part of its annual Filmfare Awards South for Tamil (Kollywood) films between 2002 and 2005..

The award was introduced and first given at the 50th South Filmfare Awards in 2002, with Vivek being the first comedian to receive the award for his performance in Run. This category has been retired since 2006.

== Winners ==
Year	Actor	Role	Film
2002	Vivek	Mohan	Run
2003	Vivek	Venkataraman Iyengar	Saamy
2004	Vivek	Kuzhandaiswamy "Kuzhanda"	Perazhagan
2005	Vadivelu	Murgesan	Chandramukhi

== Nominations ==
=== 2000s ===
- 2003 Vivek - Saamy as Venkatraman
  - Vadivelu - Winner as Kaipullai
  - Vivek - Dhool as Narayana Swamy (Narain)

== Sources ==
- Dhananjayan, G. (2011). The Best of Tamil Cinema, 1931 to 2010: 1977–2010. Galatta Media. ISBN 978-81-921043-0-0.
