= Dhool =

2003 Indian film by Dharani

- Poster
- Directed by: Dharani
- Screenplay by: Dharani
- Dialogues by: Bharathan
- Story by: Dharani
- Produced by: A. M. Rathnam
- Starring: Vikram; Jyothika; Reema Sen
- Cinematography: S. Gopinath
- Edited by: V. T. Vijayan
- Music by: Vidyasagar
- Production company: Sri Surya Movies
- Release date: 14 January 2003
- Running time: 172 minutes
- Country: India
- Language: Tamil
- Budget: ₹7 crore
- Box office: est. ₹12–13 crore

Dhool (transl. Fantastic) is a 2003 Indian Tamil-language masala film written and directed by Dharani. The film stars Vikram and Jyothika in lead roles while Reema Sen, Vivek, Sayaji Shinde, Telangana Shakuntala and Pasupathy play other supporting roles. It follows a man who fights to close a chemical factory that has been releasing toxic waste into the river, affecting the people of his village.

Produced by A. M. Rathnam at a cost of ₹7 crore, Dhool was released on 14 January 2003 and became a commercial success. It was remade in Telugu as Veede (2003) with Sayaji, Sen and Pasupathy reprising their roles, in Punjabi as The Lion of Punjab (2011) and in Sinhala as Ranja (2014).

== Plot ==
Arumugam is a kind-hearted man whose village is suffering due to a chemical factory which releases toxic waste into the river. The villagers decide to petition Minister Kaalaipandi, requesting him to close the factory. Arumugam and his childhood friend, Eswari, along with her grandmother Mundakanni, leave to Chennai to meet Kaalaipandi, who has won from the village's constituency. The three reach Chennai and stay with Narayanasamy alias Narain, who also belongs to the same village, but is settled in Chennai. Swapna is a fashion model who also lives near Narain's home and gets attracted to Arumugam, whereas Narain loves her. Arumugam meets Kaalaipandi amidst a heavy crowd and conveys the problems faced by their villagers due to water pollution. Kaalaipandi assures that he will take swift action.

Meanwhile, Sornakka and her brother Aadhi are local goons who are involved in many illegal activities, with Kaalaipandi supporting them. One day, Eswari accidentally collides with Aadhi, following which he tries to hit her, but is saved by Arumugam. In the ensuing scuffle, Arumugam fractures Aadhi's hands. Sornakka and Aadhi set an eye on Arumugam and decided to trouble him. Along with Kaalaipandi's help, Sornakka and Aadhi kidnap Arumugam and injure him. Kaalaipandi also informs that he will never take any action against the chemical factory in his village. Swapna rescues and treats Arumugam. Arumugam discloses Kaalaipandi's true face and the culprits behind him to Eswari and Mundakanni. Arumugam decides to take revenge on Kaalaipandi and tarnish his image among the public. Arumugam uses Kaalaipandi's memopad and forges a letter using Kaalapandi's signature with the help of Swapna, praising an adult film and requesting it to be published in a daily newspaper.

The newspaper editor believes it and publishes it the next day. This brings agitation among political parties and people demand resignation from Kaalaipandi. Sornakka decides to kidnap Swapna and make her approval against Arumugam but he saved her. After getting their plan failed. Sornakka and her gang plans to finish Arumugam and his people. Knowing this, Arumugam sent Eswari and her grandmother to their village but on the way Sornakka and her gang injures Eswari. Enraged, Arumugam admits Eswari and there he meets Sub-Inspector Karunakaran, who was being stated as mental by Kaalapandi and Sornakka. Karunakaran is a sincere police officer who had helped Arumugam by arresting Sornakka's brother under the latter's eye-witness. Kaalapandi make Karunakaran to release those gangsters and states that the latter is an abnormal person. To take revenge, Arumugam makes Karunakaran escape from the hospital. Karunakaran kills Aadhi and his two brothers and says that Kaalpandi ordered him to do this. Kaalaipandi decides to bring back his lost image by staging a fast until death event, which will bring sympathy among citizens.

Arumugam mixes his village's dirty water into the drink served to break the fast. He disclosed about the water to the media that it is contaminated water which was there in his village. He also reveals that he came to the city to tell about the problems arise from the chemical factory to the minister. But after knowing the dark side of the minister, he wants to show it to the public. He will reveal who's the minister and what his planning towards Government. Fearing his position, Kaalaipandi and Sornakka plans to kill the Chief Minister and put the blame on Arumugam. Arumugam thrashes Sornakka's gang members and Arumugam beats Sornakka in which she is beaten by a Lorry to death. Arumugam gets to know from Kaalpandi's P.A., Hari, that Kaalpandi is going to kill the CM and puts the blame on former. Kaalpandi attempts to kill the CM in the hospital while putting the blame on Arumugam. But Arumugam saves the CM intelligently by screaming that hospital is bombed. Arumugam is arrested. Kaalaipandi tells Arumgam that he kills the CM inside the ambulance. When Kaalaipandi once again tries his luck to kill the CM, Arumugam uses his skills and gets Kaalaipandi killed by police officers who were aiming for Arumugam. The CM exposes Kaalaipandi, while Arumugam and the villagers celebrate as the CM takes action to close the chemical factory.

== Cast ==
- Vikram as Arumugam
- Jyothika as Eswari
- Reema Sen as Swapna
- Vivek as Narayanasamy (Narain)
- Prem Sundar as Sullan
- Sayaji Shinde as Minister Kaalaipandi
- Telangana Shakuntala as Sornakka
- Pasupathy as Aadhi, Sornakka's brother
- Manoj K. Jayan as Sub-Inspector Karunakaran
- Mayilsamy as Kunchacko, Narain's Friend
- Paravai Muniyamma as Mundakanni
- Kalairani as Arumugam's mother
- Bosskey as Nakkeeran Magazine editor
- Chitti Babu as Hari
- Chaplin Balu as Narain's labourer
- Kottachi as Narain's labourer
- Karnaa Radha
- Shakeela as Herself
- Koena Mitra as Herself in a special appearance in the Song Koduva Meesai

== Production ==
After the success of their 2001 collaboration Dhill, Dharani and Vikram announced in February 2002 that they were to come together again for a project titled Dhool. The lead role had originally been offered to Vijay and Ajith Kumar, both of whom declined. The song "Aasai Aasai" was partially shot in Denmark, and plans had been earlier made to shoot song sequences in London, though the team later opted against doing so and according to choreographer Kalyan it was shot at Switzerland for three days. A huge set of a temple, a church, some houses and a shopping area, was erected at the Indian Express office premises. The song "Koduva Meesai" was shot at Pollachi.

== Soundtrack ==
The music was composed by Vidyasagar. A part of the song "Karimizhi Kuruviye" from the 2002 Malayalam film Meesa Madhavan was reused in "Aasai Aasai", which was later reused as "Rafta Rafta" with a slight change in tune in the 2004 Hindi film Hulchul, another film where the music was composed by Vidyasagar. The music of "Ithanundu Muthathile" and "Koduva Meesai" were used for two songs in Telugu film Naaga, another film that Vidyasagar composed the music for.

Cinesouth wrote, "Dhool's songs are not aimed at appealing to your musical aesthetic senses. They are just made in order to fill the producer's collection boxes. Of the six songs, three will stay in your memory while you watch the film. The moment you step outside the hall, you won't remember them. But, 'Iththoondu muththam' and 'Aasai aasai' songs will stay in memory for a short while before they fade into oblivion. However, the song sung by 'Paravai' Muniamma, ' Madurai veeran thaanae', will be around for a very long time and make the listener dance to its extremely infectious tempo and energy". The song "Singam Pola" was featured in a similar manner in the climax of Veera Dheera Sooran, which also starred Vikram.

Track listing
No.	Title	Lyrics	Singer(s)	Length
1.	"Ithanundu Muthathile"	Pa. Vijay	Udit Narayan, Sowmya Raoh, Premgi Amaren	4:28
2.	"Madurai Veeran (Singam Pola)"	Arivumathi	Paravai Muniyamma	3:21
3.	"Koduva Meesai"	Na. Muthukumar	Manikka Vinayagam, Vidhu Prabhakar	4:45
4.	"Aasai Aasai"	Kabilan	Shankar Mahadevan, Sujatha Mohan	5:21
5.	"Inthadi"	Pa. Vijay	Tippu, Kalyan, Rafi	4:03
6.	"Kundu Kundu"	Arivumathi	KK, Sunidhi Chauhan, Pop Shalini	4:55
Total length:				26:53

== Release ==
Dhool was released on 14 January 2003, during Pongal, and was financially successful, despite opening alongside other prominent ventures such as Anbe Sivam and Vaseegara. The film's success cemented Vikram's reached peak in Tamil Nadu. At the International Tamil Film Awards, Vikram won the Best Actor Award, and Jyothika won Best Actress.

== Critical reception ==
Aarkhay of Rediff.com review praised Vikram's enactment citing that "Vikram is at his peak" and that "he seems as much at home with comedy as with action, in romance as in emotional sequences". Malathi Rangarajan of The Hindu said, "Vikram's brain-brawn combo does help sustain the tempo. It's only that there's nothing new that "Dhool" offers. But as long as the till keeps ringing, little else matters, you suppose". Sify wrote, "Vikram's Dhool is a typical omnibus masala concoction serving all the nine rasas that go into a typical pot-boiler meant for the front-benchers. The verdict right away is not bad, if you are the type who love unadulterated kichidi entertainers. Still it could have been a whole lot better, if the climax hadn't gone irrevocably loony". Visual Dasan of Kalki called the film a same old commercial film which entertains calling it a dosa served as a pizza while praising the performances of all star cast and concluded saying Dharani, the director who has given importance to the message of giving pizza to be baked in a bullet train that is moving at a stormy speed, like ginger juice for digestion, can now be called an action director.

Malini Mannath of Chennai Online wrote "A judicious blend of action and glamour, humour and sentiment, and a fast-paced racy narrative style that gives no lagging moments". Cinesouth wrote "Director Dharani has made a perfect masala film maybe because he sensed that the young crowd just wouldn't step into the theatre to watch a good film. The number of people who watch masala films far outnumber the number of people who watch films with good stories and realistic screenplays. Dharani sensed it and made another perfectly blended masala film like 'Dhil'. And, he has succeeded in style". C. Shivakumar of Deccan Herald wrote "A violent film, which has all the elements of a masala flick—action, romance, and good music. This is writer-director Dharani’s second film with Vikram, after Dhill. The film has a good narration in the first half but then the script goes haywire. The director has tried to overdramatise the lead character and at times just forgets the existence of other cast".

== Remakes ==
Dhool was remade in Telugu as Veede (2003), with Reema Sen, Sayaji Shinde, Pasupathy and Manoj K. Jayan reprising their roles. A Hindi remake was planned by Guddu Dhanoa in 2004 with Sunny Deol and Gracy Singh starring, but did not materialise. The film was remade in Punjabi as The Lion of Punjab (2011). In Sri Lanka, the film was remade in Sinhala as Ranja (2014).
