= Unnaruge Naan Irundhal =

- Poster
- Directed by: Selvaa
- Written by: Murthy Ramesh; Nagulan Ponnusamy (dialogues)
- Screenplay by: Selvaa
- Produced by: K. Muralidharan; V. Swaminathan; G. Venugopal
- Starring: R. Parthiban; Meena
- Cinematography: R. Raghunatha Reddy
- Edited by: Suresh Urs
- Music by: Deva
- Production company: Lakshmi Movie Makers
- Release date: 3 December 1999
- Country: India
- Language: Tamil

Unnaruge Naan Irundhal (transl. If I am around you) is a 1999 Indian Tamil-language romantic comedy film directed by Selvaa. It stars R. Parthiban and Meena, while Manorama, Vadivelu, Vivek, and Anandaraj play supporting roles. The film has music by Deva, editing by Suresh Urs, and cinematography by R. Raghunatha Reddy. It was released on 3 December 1999 and became a success.

== Plot ==
R. Parthiban plays a die-hard fan of Rambha and a self-interest governed taxi driver whose name is never revealed throughout the film. Meena plays Mahalakshmi, the daughter of a "zamindar" who has lost all his money due to financial troubles; his death leaves Mahalakshmi with a lot of debts (over two lakhs worth). Parthiban is the taxi driver that drives Mahalakshmi's dead father's corpse back to her hometown. There, the people that Mahalakshmi is now indebted to by Anandaraj, who tortures Mahalakshmi with cruel words for being unable to pay the debt. Later, Parthiban helps Mahalakshmi out by giving his taxi in replace to her debt in order to save her at the point of time. However, the twist in the movie is that Parthiban irritates Mahalakshmi, though unwillingly, to get back his taxi as soon as possible. In the later part, Mahalakshmi falls in love with Parthiban for his continuous help and support towards Mahalakshmi. At that time Parthiban's dream girl actress, Rambha, comes for shooting in that palace, which makes Mahalakshmi very angry and jealous as all his attention has been diverted to Rambha. At the end of the shooting, Rambha tries to talk to Parthiban and Mahalakshmi and make them realise their love for each other. However, Mahalakshmi never sees any sign of Parthiban loving her and thus accepts to marry the villain (Anandaraj's) son to get back Parthiban's taxi and settle her debt. Eventually, Parthiban realises his love for Mahalakshmi and tries to stop the wedding as the groom is also a bad guy who cheated Manorama's daughter. Finally the movie ends on a happy note with Mahalakshmi getting back all her money and property and leading a happy life with Parthiban.

== Cast ==
- R. Parthiban as Taxi Driver
- Meena as Mahalakshmi
- Manorama as Caring Maid
- Vadivelu as Vadivelu
- Vivek as Film Director
- Anandaraj as Jamindar
- Jai Ganesh as Rajamgam
- Sathyapriya as Sathyavadi
- Fathima Babu as Jamindar's wife
- Santhana Bharathi
- Kaka Radhakrishnan
- Vaiyapuri
- Nellai Siva
- Rambha (guest appearance)
- Indraja (item dance)
- Anand (guest appearance)
- Anju Aravind (guest appearance)
- Sindhu (Vadivelu's Lover)

== Soundtrack ==
Soundtrack was composed by Deva.

Song	Singer(s)	Lyrics	Duration
"Chinna Chinna Poove"	Sujatha	Na. Muthukumar	05:51
"Enthan Uyire Enthan Uyire"	K. S. Chithra, Krishnaraj	Thamarai	06:07
"Podava Kattina"	Shankar Mahadevan, Anuradha Sriram	K. Subash	06:08
"Poori Poori"	Swarnalatha, Unni Menon	Kalaikumar	05:36
"Victoria Victoria"	Anuradha Sriram, Naveen	Palani Bharathi	05:30

== Reception ==
Savitha Padmanabhan of The Hindu wrote, "The plot is cliched and the climax drags. But what makes the film watchable is the comedy track". She also appreciated Parthiban's performance and the dialogues. Aurangazeb of Kalki praised Selva for making a film without the usual twists, fights, emotional scenes and also praised Parthiban for acting. K. N. Vijiyan of New Straits Times wrote, "What lifts this movie above the mediocre are the scintillating dialogue and unusual love story. This is better than average, and everything you would expect from a Parthipan film". Chennai Online wrote "It is a film that starts on a different note, is fairly interesting till it is half-way through & then gets distracted by unwanted additions to the narration. And finally peters down to predictable situations, leading to the desired happy ending".
