= Film Fest New Haven =

The Film Fest New Haven (FFNH) is an annual film festival held in New Haven, Connecticut, United States, home of Yale University. Also sometimes known as the New Haven Film Fest, it is a non-profit organisation that was founded in 1995. This independent film festival features premieres and screenings of films made by filmmakers around the world. It screens dramatic, documentary, short, comedic and experimental films and presents Special, Jury and Audience awards in many categories.
