= Run (2002 film) =

2002 film by N. Lingusamy

- Theatrical release poster
- Directed by: N. Linguswamy
- Screenplay by: N. Linguswamy
- Dialogues by: Mona. Pazhanisamy
- Story by: N. Linguswamy
- Produced by: A. M. Rathnam
- Starring: Madhavan; Meera Jasmine; Raghuvaran; Atul Kulkarni
- Cinematography: Jeeva
- Edited by: V. T. Vijayan
- Music by: Vidyasagar
- Production company: Sri Surya Movies
- Distributed by: Sri Surya Movies
- Release date: 5 September 2002
- Running time: 155 minutes
- Country: India
- Language: Tamil

Run is a 2002 Indian Tamil-language romantic action film directed by N. Linguswamy and produced by A. M. Rathnam under Sri Surya Movies. It stars Madhavan and Meera Jasmine (in her Tamil debut), alongside Atul Kulkarni, Raghuvaran, Vivek and Anu Hasan. The music was composed by Vidyasagar, while the cinematography and editing were handled by Jeeva and V. T. Vijayan.

Run was released on 5 September 2002 to positive reviews from critics blockbuster movie of year 2002 & Highest-grossing movie of the year, which prompted the film to be partially reshot in Telugu with Sunil playing Vivek's role. It was remade in Hindi under the same title by Jeeva, with Abhishek Bachchan and Bhumika Chawla reprising the roles of Madhavan and Meera Jasmine.

== Plot ==
Shiva lives in Srirangam, arrives at Chennai to gain admission to a college, and stays with his sister and her husband. He does not like his brother-in-law and never talks to him despite several attempts made by his sister to convince them. Shiva meets Priya during a bus journey. He meets her on a few more occasions and proposes to her. However, Priya warns him to stop following her despite being in love with him.

Shiva learns that Priya's brother, Bhaskar, is a local gangster who attacks when anyone follows Priya. She does not want Shiva to get beaten by Bhaskar and advises him to stop following her. Bhaskar's henchmen spot Shiva and Priya together and try to attack him. Shiva thrashes them, ultimately encouraging Priya to go against Bhaskar. Shiva's brother-in-law learns about his love and offers help which makes them talk to each other, much to the happiness of Shiva's sister.

Bhaskar arrives to attack Shiva's family, but Shiva threatens to attack Bhaskar's family, thereby frightening him. Priya elopes with Shiva and Bhaskar chases after them along with his men. The couple is tracked down and the goons start attacking Shiva. Priya interferes and challenges Bhaskar to attack Shiva single-handedly without any help from his men. Bhaskar accepts and starts attacking Shiva, but Shiva retaliates and hits back at Bhaskar, who gets severely injured. He finally lets Shiva and Priya unite.

== Cast ==
- Madhavan as Shiva
- Meera Jasmine as Priya
- Raghuvaran as Shiva's brother-in-law
- Atul Kulkarni as Bhaskar
- Vivek as Mohan
- Anu Hasan as Shiva's sister
- Janaki Sabesh as Shiva's mother
- Rajashree as Priya's sister-in-law
- Kalairani
- S. N. Lakshmi
- Madhan Bob as Ticket examiner
- Vijayan as Bhaskar's Right hand
- Nellai Siva as Politician
- Ravi Prakash as Shiva's father
- Bonda Mani as Biriyani shop owner
- "Saathappan" Nandhakumar as Nagaraj, Mohan's father
- Sampath Ram
- Bava Lakshmanan
- Benjamin

Telugu version

- Sunil as Mohan
- Babu Mohan as Nagaraj, Mohan's father
- Lakshmi Priya as Kamakshi, Mohan's mother
- Kallu Chidambaram as Childless man
- Gautam Raju as Fake doctor
- Kadambari Kiran as Real doctor

== Production ==
Vijay was initially considered to play the lead role. Madhavan signed the film in January 2002 after being impressed with Lingusamy's narration and through the project would make his first appearance in an action-orientated role. Madhavan wanted to do an action film after being instructed by Mani Ratnam to move away from romantic drama films and lost eight kilograms to portray the lead role. Vidya Balan was originally selected to play the lead role in the film, but was later released from her contract.

The makers then signed on Raima Sen to portray the lead role before deciding to change the lead actress again after the actress struggled with the Tamil dialogues. Meera Jasmine was consequently signed on to make her first appearance in Tamil films before finalising Sangeetha. Atul Kulkarni was signed to play an antagonist, marking a rare move for the actor towards regular antagonistic roles. Raghuvaran, Anu Hasan, and Vivek were also signed on to work on the film with Vivek filming a separate comedy track.

The scenes were shot at locations in Chennai, Karaikudi, and Srirangam, among other places, while the songs were shot abroad in Denmark and Switzerland. The team also filmed scenes at the M.G. R. Film City in Chennai, where action sequences were filmed. The film completed production in one schedule, with Madhavan remarking about the well-organised structure of the shoot.

== Soundtrack ==
Run

Soundtrack album by Vidyasagar
- Released: 12 August 2002
- Genre: Feature film soundtrack
- Label: Five Star Audio; Ayngaran Music

Vidyasagar chronology
Karmegham (2002)	Run (2002)	Villain (2002)

The music was composed by Vidyasagar, with lyrics written by Na. Muthukumar, Pa. Vijay, Thamarai, Yugabharathi, Arivumathi, and Viveka. The soundtrack won critical acclaim and became Vidyasagar's most successful album at the time of its release.

Track listing
No.	Title	Lyrics	Singer(s)	Length
1.	"Theradi Veethiyile"	Na. Muthukumar	Karthik, Timmy, Manicka Vinayagam	04:57
2.	"Ichutha Ichutha"	Pa. Vijay	Devan, Sowmya Raoh, Naveen, Pop Shalini	04:35
3.	"Kaadhal Pisase"	Yugabharathi	Udit Narayan, Sujatha Mohan	04:38
4.	"Poi Solla Koodaathu"	Arivumathi	Hariharan, Sadhana Sargam	04:53
5.	"Panikaatrey"	Thamarai	Balram, Sadhana Sargam	04:38
6.	"Minsaram En Meethu (Kadhal Seeye)"	Viveka	Harish Raghavendra, Sadhana Sargam, Jack Smelly	04:57
7.	"Azhagiya Thimirudan (Priya O Priya)"	Viveka	Vidyasagar, Sadhana Sargam, Jack Smelly	02:16

== Release ==
The release was postponed from July 2002 to September 2002 to finish off post-production works. However, the box-office bomb of Rajinikanth-starrer Baba (2002) meant that the makers were able to prepone the film to the earliest release date in September to avoid other competition. The makers of the film chose to release the film on Thursday instead of Friday, in order to avoid a box office clash with King (2002). The film was later dubbed and released in Telugu under the same name on 3 April 2003 with the comedy portions re-shot with Telugu actors. The Telugu version was released on the same day as Dil (2003) since that film had a similar storyline.

== Reception ==
Run received positive reviews from critics.

=== Critical response ===
Malathi Rangarajan of The Hindu wrote "The track Lingusamy has chosen could be an age-old one, but the agility and youthfulness make the run interesting". Malini Mannath of Chennai Online wrote "It is to the director’s credit that he has kept the narration fast paced and engaging with not many lagging moments". Nowrunning wrote "Director Linguswamy has given a very enjoyable film with good music by Vidyasagar and brilliant cinematography by Jeeva. Madhavan has proved in this film that he can also do action and that too convincingly". Cinema Today wrote "There is nothing new about the film's story, but Madhavan's new incarnation as an action hero and Linguswamy's racy screenplay has made this a thoroughly enjoyable experience". R Shiva Srivatsav of Angelfire wrote "The other hero in this film apart from our cute hero Madhavan is the screenplay of the movie".

=== Box office ===
Run went on to become amongst the highest-grossing Tamil films of the year in 2002 and became Madhavan's most profitable film at the time of release. Vivek also won the Best Comedian Award at the Filmfare Awards 2002.

== Legacy ==
The film was later remade the film in Hindi by Jeeva with Abhishek Bachchan, Bhumika Chawla and Vijay Raaz and into Bengali Bangladesh in 2004 as Rukhe Darao with Shakib Khan and Sahara.

A scene involving Madhavan closing a subway shutter was later parodied in the spoof film Tamizh Padam (2010), while it was also referred to in Vettai (2012), in which the actor and director had collaborated again.
