= International Tamil Film Awards =

ITFA Awards
- Awarded for: Excellence in cinematic achievements in Tamil cinema
- Country: Singapore
- First award: 2003
- Website: http://www.itfa.com.sg/

The International Tamil Film Awards (ITFA) is an awards ceremony that honours excellence in Tamil language films around the world since 2003.

== History ==
The awards began in 2003 and the awards honour films from the previous calendar year.

== Awards ==
- Best Picture
- Best Director
- Best Actor
- Best Actress
- Best Supporting Actor
- Best Supporting Actress
- Best New Actor
- Best New Actress
- Best Villain
- Best Comedian (Male)
- Best Comedian (Female)
- Best Music Director
- Best Cinematographer
- Best Lyricist
- Best Male Playback
- Best Female Playback

== See also ==
- Tamil Cinema
- Cinema of India
