= List of Tamil films of 2003 =

Post-amendment to the Tamil Nadu Entertainments Tax Act 1939 on 12 June 2000, gross fell to 125 per cent of net. The Commercial Taxes Department disclosed ₹75.07 crore in entertainment tax revenue for the year.

A list of films released in the Tamil film industry in India in 2003:

== Box office collection ==
The following is the list of highest-grossing Tamil cinema films released in 2003.

The Highest Worldwide Gross of 2003
Rank	Title	Production company	Worldwide gross
1	Saamy	Kavithalayaa Productions	₹35 crore
2	Dhool	Sri Surya Movies	₹27−28 crore
3	Thirumalai	Kavithalayaa Productions	₹25 crore
4	Pithamagan	V Creations	₹20−22 crore
5	Kaakha Kaakha	GJ Cinema	₹18−20 crore
6	Vaseegara	Shot N' Stills Ltd	₹15 crore
7	Kaadhal Kondein	R. K. Productions	₹13 crore
8	Thiruda Thirudi	Indian Theatre Productions	₹12 crore
9	Chokka Thangam	GV Films	₹11 crore
10	Anbe Sivam	Lakshmi Movie Makers	₹10−12 crore

== List of Tamil films ==
=== January—March ===
Opening		Title	Director	Cast	Studio	Ref
J A N	10	Dhool	Dharani	Vikram, Jyothika, Reemma Sen, Vivek	Sri Surya Movies	
J A N	15	Anbe Sivam	Sundar C	Kamal Haasan, Madhavan, Kiran Rathod, Nassar	Lakshmi Movie Makers	
J A N	15	Annai Kaligambal	Rama Narayanan	Livingston, Ramya Krishnan, Anu Prabhakar	Sri Thenandal Films	
J A N	15	Chokka Thangam	K. Bhagyaraj	Vijayakanth, Soundarya, Prakash Raj	GV Films	
J A N	15	Kalatpadai	J. Ramesh	Jai, Vidhu	Chozha Creations	
J A N	15	Ramachandra	Raj Kapoor	Sathyaraj, Vijayalakshmi	Kanagarathna Movies	
J A N	15	Vaseegara	K. Selva Bharathy	Vijay, Sneha	Shots N' Stills Ltd.	
J A N	24	Pop Corn	Nassar	Mohanlal, Simran	Kana Film Makers	
J A N	31	Aasai Aasaiyai	Ravi Mariya	Jiiva, Sharmilee	Super Good Films	
F E B	6	Anbu	Thalapathy Raj	Bala, Deepu, Vadivelu	Udhayageetha Cine Creations	
F E B	14	Anbu Thollai	Hayath	Pandiarajan, Ravali	Kyoshi Movies	
F E B	14	Julie Ganapathi	Balu Mahendra	Jayaram, Saritha, Ramya Krishnan	GJ Cinemaa	
F E B	14	Kadhaludan	Rajakumaran	Murali, Devayani, Abbas	Raade Films	
F E B	14	Student Number 1	Selva	Sibi Raj, Sherin	Sena Films	
F E B	21	Yes Madam	Rajaji	Prabhu, Vijayalakshmi, Vindhya	Bheemaraja Pictures	
F E B	28	Military	G. Sai Suresh	Sathyaraj, Rambha, Vijayalakshmi	Cine Times Entertainment	
F E B	28	Pallavan	Padmamagan	Manoj Bharathiraja, Rathi	Usha Theaters	
M A R	20	Ilasu Pudhusu Ravusu	L. C. Selva	Deepak Dinkar, Suja Varunee, Vadivelu		
M A R	20	Manasellam	Santhosh	Srikanth, Trisha	Aascar Films	
M A R	20	Nilavil Kalangamillai	V. Sabrivel	Agnivesh, Malar, Babilona		
M A R	20	Pavalakkodi	Ram-CP Saravanan	Vijay Sarathi, Robert, Paval, Shaama, Nirosha		
M A R	21	Ennai Thalatta Varuvala	K. S. Ravindran	Ajith Kumar, Vignesh, Reshma	Muthalaya Films	

=== April—June ===
Opening		Title	Director	Cast	Studio	Ref
A P R	11	Magic Magic 3D	Jose	Suraj Balajee, S. P. Balasubrahmanyam, Pooja Kumar, Tirlok Malik	Navodaya Studio	
A P R	13	Dum	A. Venkatesh	Silambarasan, Rakshita	Rockline Productions	
A P R	13	Kadhal Sadugudu	V. Z. Durai	Vikram, Priyanka Trivedi	Nic Arts	
A P R	13	Sena	Sujith	Sathyaraj, Aravind Akash, Charulatha	Sri Saivani Movies	
A P R	14	Arasu	Suresh	Sarathkumar, Simran, Roja	JJ Good Films	
A P R	14	Banda Paramasivam	T. P. Gajendran	Prabhu, Abbas, Rambha, Monika	Varshene Films	
A P R	25	Punnagai Poove	S. D. Sabapathy	Nandha, Kaveri, Rekha Vedavyas	V Creations	
A P R	25	Well Done	Ravindran	Jayanth, Chytra Hallikeri	Royal Frames	
M A Y	1	Anbe Anbe	Mani Bharathi	Shaam, Sharmelee	AVM Productions	
M A Y	1	Indru Mudhal	M. A. Murugesh	Mithun Tejaswi, Daisy Bopanna, Nanditha	Kollywood Kreations	
M A Y	1	Saamy	Hari	Vikram, Trisha, Vivek	Kavithalayaa Productions	
M A Y	8	Inidhu Inidhu Kadhal Inidhu	Sakthi Chidambaram	Jai Akash, Neha, Hamsavardhan, Monica	Usha Kiran Movies	
M A Y	8	Pudhiya Geethai	K. P. Jagannath	Vijay, Ameesha Patel, Meera Jasmine, Kalabhavan Mani	Viswaas Productions	
M A Y	16	Lesa Lesa	Priyadarshan	Shaam, Madhavan, Trisha	Film Works	
M A Y	16	Parthiban Kanavu	Karu Pazhaniappan	Srikanth, Sneha	Sathya Jyothi Films	
M A Y	30	Parasuram	Arjun	Arjun, Kiran, Gayathri Raguram, Abbas	Anbalaya Films	
J U N	12	Nala Damayanthi	Mouli	R. Madhavan, Geetu Mohandas, Shrutika, Anu Hasan	Raaj Kamal Films International	
J U N	13	Paarai	K. S. Ravikumar	Sarath Kumar, Jayaram, Meena, Ramya Krishnan	Mass Movie Makers	
J U N	20	Jayam	M. Raja	Jayam Ravi, Sadha, Gopichand	M. L. Movie Arts	

=== July—September ===
Opening		Title	Director	Cast	Studio	Ref
J U L	4	Ice	Raghuraj	Ashok, Priyanka Trivedi	Joy Entertainment	
J U L	4	Kaadhal Kondein	Selvaraghavan	Dhanush, Sonia Agarwal, Sudeep Sarangi	R. K. Productions	
J U L	4	Kovilpatti Veeralakshmi	K. Rajeswar	Simran, Sonu Sood, Sherin, Alex	Hemanth Cine Factory	
J U L	4	Whistle	J.D-Jerry	Vikramaditya, Sherin, Gayathri Raguram	Media Dreams	
J U L	11	Priyamaana Thozhi	Vikraman	R. Madhavan, Jyothika, Sridevi Vijayakumar, Vineeth	AVM Productions	
J U L	18	Aahaa Ethanai Azhagu	Kanmani	Mithun Tejaswi, Charmee, Bhavana	Power Media	
J U L	18	Kadhal Kisu Kisu	P. Vasu	Bala, Charmee, Kalabhavan Mani	Super Star Art Movies	
J U L	18	Thayumanavan	Saravanan	Saravanan, Prema, Babloo Prithviraj	Atthanur Amman Arts	
A U G	1	Idhayamae	Raviraja	Ishaq Hussaini, Krishnana, Vadivelu		
A U G	1	Kaakha Kaakha	Gautham Vasudev Menon	Suriya, Jyothika, Jeevan, Daniel Balaji	V. Creations	
A U G	1	Thithikudhe	Brinda Sarathy	Jiiva, Sridevi Vijayakumar, Shrutika	Super Good Films	
A U G	1	Vikadan	Arun Pandian	Harish Raghavendra, Arun Pandian, Gayathri Raguram, Radhika Chaudhari	Friends Creation	
A U G	8	Eera Nilam	Bharathiraja	Manoj Bharathiraja, Nanditha, Suhasini Maniratnam, Vadivelu	Manoj Creations	
A U G	15	Alaudin	Ravi Chakravathy	Prabhu Deva, Ashima Bhalla, Raghuvaran	Venkateswaralayam	
A U G	15	Thennavan	A. M. Nandakumar	Vijayakanth, Kiran Rathod, Nassar, Urvashi	Captain Cine Creations	
A U G	22	Diwan	Surya Prakash	Sarath Kumar, Kiran Rathod, Sharmilee, Vadivelu	Shree Rajalakshmi Films	
A U G	29	Boys	S. Shankar	Siddharth, Genelia D'Souza, Vivek, Bharath, Nakul, S. Thaman, Manikandan	Sri Surya Movies	
S E P	5	Success	Prashanthshekhar	Dushyanth, Sonia Agarwal, Nandana, Roja, Urvashi	Issakki Creations	
S E P	5	Thiruda Thirudi	Subramaniam Siva	Dhanush, Chaya Singh, Karunas	Indian Theatre Productions	
S E P	12	Alai	Vikram Kumar	Silambarasan, Trisha, Vivek, Raghuvaran, Saranya	Damini Enterprise	
S E P	12	Aalukkoru Aasai	V. Sekhar	Sathyaraj, Meena, Manthra, Vadivelu, Kalpana	Thiruvalluvar Kalaikoodam	
S E P	19	Naam	Saba Kailash	Jai Varma, Prakash Raj, Rashmi Murali, Kalabhavan Mani	Duet Movies	
S E P	19	Unnai Charanadaindhen	Samuthirakani	Venkat Prabhu, S. P. B. Charan, Meera Vasudevan, Santhoshi	Capital Film Works	
S E P	19	Dhivya Teacher	Kuha Jayaraj	Anand, Vinitha, Jagan		
S E P	27	Bheeshmar	Ranjith	Ranjith, Devayani, Riyaz Khan	Maverick Entertainment	
S E P	27	Galatta Ganapathy	Karthik Kumar	Pandiarajan, Sanghavi		
S E P	27	Kaiyodu Kai	Rajan Sarma	Aravind Akash, Yugendran, Sona	Vamana Pictures	
S E P	27	Ragasiyamai	Amuthan	Prasanna, Neelam Singh, Karunas	Art and Heart Movie Makers	
S E P	27	Three Roses	Parameswar	Rambha, Jyothika, Laila, Urvashi, Vivek, Vijay Adhiraj	Infocus Ltd. Parijay Creators	
S E P	27	Winner	Sundar C	Prashanth, Kiran Rathod, Vadivelu	Mother India Movies International	

=== October—December ===
Opening		Title	Director	Cast	Studio	Ref
O C T	10	Vadakku Vaasal	B. M. Sundar	Karthik Kumar, Rithana		
O C T	24	Anjaneya	N. Maharajan	Ajith Kumar, Meera Jasmine, Raghuvaran, Jaya Prakash Reddy	Nic Arts	
O C T	24	Ottran	Ilankannan	Arjun, Simran, Tejashree, Sarath Babu	Popular Movies	
O C T	24	Pithamagan	Bala	Vikram, Suriya, Laila, Sangeetha	Evergreen Movie International	
O C T	24	Thirumalai	Ramana	Vijay, Jyothika, Kausalya, Manoj K. Jayan	Kavithalayaa Productions	
N O V	14	Jay Jay	Saran	R. Madhavan, Pooja, Amoga, Kalabhavan Mani	Aascar Film Pvt. Ltd	
N O V	21	Iyarkai	S. P. Jananathan	Shaam, Arun Vijay, Kutti Radhika, Seema Biswas	Prisem Films	
N O V	21	Kurumbu	Vishnuvardhan	Allari Naresh, Nikita Thukral, Diya	Indira Innovations	
N O V	28	Nadhi Karaiyinile	Ponvannan	Suvalakshmi, Rajan P. Dev, Ramji	National Film Development Corporation of India	
D E C	5	Anbe Un Vasam	R. Balu	Ashwin, Rathi Arumugam, Yogan	Annai Vannamathi Films	
D E C	5	Mullil Roja	Kasthuri Pandian	Vishnu, Lahari, Lakshmi		
D E C	12	Ooruku Nooruper	B. Lenin	Hans Kaushik, G. M. Sundar, Archana, Julie	National Film Development Corporation of India	
D E C	12	Konji Pesalaam	R. Kaleeswaran	Rajkiran, Sreeja, Vamsi	Stanwin Productions	
D E C	19	Enakku 20 Unakku 18	A. M. Jyothi Krishna	Tarun Kumar, Trisha, Shriya	Sri Surya Movies	
D E C	19	Joot	Azhagam Perumal	Srikanth, Meera Jasmine, Vivek, Tejashree	Sri Lakshmi Productions	
D E C	19	Paththikichu	S. S. Arasan	Devaguru, Manjari, Shakeela, Abhinayashree		
D E C	19	Thathi Thavadhu Manasu	Azhagu Rajusundaram	Mumtaj, Urvashi Patel, Sindhuri, Kalabhavan Mani	Wide Visions	
D E C	19	Soori	Shelvan	Vignesh, R. Parthiepan, Uma, Vijayalakshmi	Sri Kamakshi Studios	
D E C	25	Indru	Naveen Muthuraman	Karthik, Tanu Roy, Maina	Kashyap Productions	
D E C	25	Sindhamal Sitharamal	K. A. Shanmugavel	Abbas, Nanditha, Sona, Karunas	Velu International	
D E C	26	Kadhal Kirukkan	Sakthi Chidambaram	R. Parthiepan, Richa Pallod, Vineeth	Variety Frames	
D E C	26	Oruththi	Amshan Kumar	Ganesh Babu, Poorvaja, Bala Singh		

The following films also released in 2003, though the release date remains unknown.

Title	Director	Cast	Production	Ref
IPC 215	Charuhasan	Ponvannan, Jaishankar		
Adhaanda Idhaanda	R. G. Elavalagan	Pandiarajan, Sangeetha		
Bhayam	David			
Oru Thadava Sonna	M. Jameenraj	Chinni Jayanth, Swarna, Lavanya		
Rekkai	B. Lenin	Narayana Rao, M. S. Vishalakshi, N. Madankumar		
Uyirosai	Hariram	Bharath, Soni		
Vaanam Vaazhthattum	Raveeshwar	Vimalahasan, Rashmi, Kulkarni		
Vani Mahal	Jayram	Vignesh, Suvalakshmi		

== Awards ==
Category/organization	Dinakaran Cinema Awards 10 April 2004	Filmfare Awards South 12 June 2004	Tamil Nadu State Film Awards 13 February 2006
Best Film	Pithamagan	Pithamagan	Eera Nilam
Best Director	Bala; Pithamagan	Bala; Pithamagan	Karu Pazhaniappan; Parthiban Kanavu
Best Actor	Vikram; Pithamagan	Vikram; Pithamagan	Vikram; Pithamagan
Best Actress	Jyothika; Kaakha Kaakha; Dhool	Laila; Pithamagan	Laila; Pithamagan
Best Music Director	Dhina; Thiruda Thirudi	Harris Jayaraj; Kaakha Kaakha	Harris Jayaraj; Kaakha Kaakha
