= Dindigul I. Leoni =

Indian pattimandram anchor and orator

- திண்டுக்கல் ஐ. லியோனி
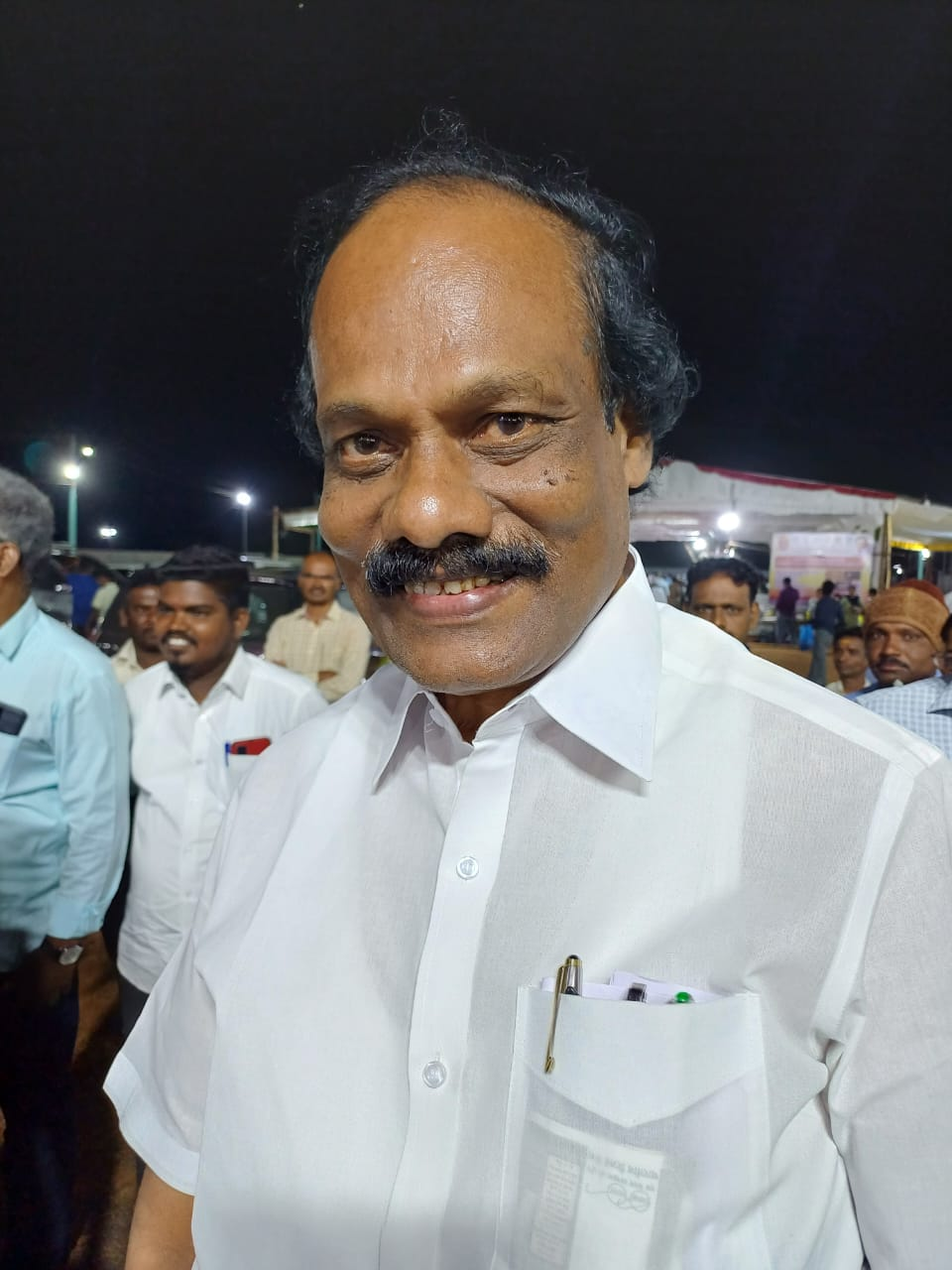
- Born: 27 March 1958 (age 68); Dindigul, Tamil Nadu, India
- Occupations: School Teacher, Orator, Politician
- Years active: 1997, 2020
- Television: Kalaignar TV
- Title: Kalaimamani
- Political party: Dravida Munnetra Kazhagam
- Spouse(s): Dr. Palaniammal; Amudha
- Children: Ahalya; Siva Kumar; Sathish Kumar
- Relatives: C. S. Amudhan (son-in-law)

Dindigul I. Leoni also known as Dindigul Leoni or simply known as Leoni (Tamil: திண்டுக்கல் ஐ. லியோனி) (born 27 March 1958) is a pattimandram anchor, social debates anchor, school teacher, orator, actor, television personality and political activist. He received the adjective Dindigul which refers to his birthplace. He is well known for his political satire and humorous speech and also for his tongue-in-cheek remarks. He currently serves as a talk show moderator in a pattimandram program telecast in Kalaignar TV. His son-in-law C. S. Amudhan is a filmmaker.

== Career ==
Leoni initially served as a school teacher at the St. Mary's Higher Secondary School in Dindigul for about 25 years. He then ventured into hosting social debate/pattimandram show "Nalla Pesunga Nallathaiye Pesunga" aired in Kalaignar TV. He eventually rose to fame and prominence in the state for his speeches in the television show. He received the state award Kalaimamani in 2010 for his stage speeches from the Government of Tamil Nadu.

He has campaigned for Tamil Nadu based political party Dravida Munnetra Kazhagam in 2011 Tamil Nadu Legislative Assembly election, 2014 Indian general election and in 2016 Tamil Nadu Legislative Assembly election.

He made his acting debut in 1997 Tamil film Ganga Gowri in a supporting role playing the role of Arun Vijay's father. He then made a comeback to film acting after a long gap of 23 years in 2020 for the unreleased film Aalambana.

== Personal life ==
His son, Leo Sivakumar, made his lead debut with Azhagiya Kanne (2023).

=== Controversies ===
In August 2016, rumours were circulating in the social media which indicated that Leoni died in a car accident. Leoni filed a lawsuit against the rumours.

In January 2018, during a pattimandram show telecast during Diwali season he made references citing Bharatiya Janata Party to "sleeper cells". He was criticised for his alleged political attacks on BJP.

== Filmography ==
Films

- Ganga Gowri (1997)
- Panni Kutty (2022)
- Aalambana (TBA)

Television

- Pudhu Pudhu Arthangal (2021) - Zee Tamil (replaced by Jayaraj)
