= Padayappa =

1999 film by K. S. Ravikumar

- Theatrical release poster
- Directed by: K. S. Ravikumar
- Screenplay by: K. S. Ravikumar
- Story by: Rajinikanth; K. S. Ravikumar
- Produced by: Rajinikanth; K. Sathya Narayana; M. V. Krishna Rao; K. Vittal Prasad Rao; P. L. Thenappan
- Starring: Sivaji Ganesan; Rajinikanth; Ramya Krishnan; Soundarya; Pritha Hari
- Cinematography: S. Murthi; K. Prasad
- Edited by: K. Thanigachalam
- Music by: A. R. Rahman
- Production company: Arunachala Cine Creations
- Release date: 10 April 1999
- Running time: 181 minutes
- Country: India
- Language: Tamil

Padayappa is a 1999 Indian Tamil-language action drama film directed by K. S. Ravikumar. It stars Sivaji Ganesan in his penultimate release, Rajinikanth in the titular lead and Ramya Krishnan, Soundarya in the lead roles, while Lakshmi, Pritha Hari, Radha Ravi, Nassar, Abbas and Sithara play supporting roles. The soundtrack album and background score were composed by A. R. Rahman. The film revolves around the title character and his family being targeted in a generations-long revenge by his cousin Neelambari, a narcissistic woman who was left humiliated after Padayappa rejected her love proposal as he was in love with her good-natured home worker Vasundhara.

Principal photography for the film began in October 1998. Padayappa was released on 10 April 1999 on the eve of Tamil New Year's Day. This was the first Tamil film to be released worldwide with 210 prints and 700,000 audio cassettes. It became Tamil cinema's highest-grossing film at that point. Ramya Krishnan's performance was praised, winning her a Filmfare Award under the Best Actress category. The film also won five Tamil Nadu State Film Awards.

== Plot ==
Padayappa, a mechanical engineer, returns to his native village of Jalakandapuram to attend the engagement of his sister, Nandhini, to Suryaprakash, the son of his maternal uncle Rajarathnam. Padayappa's father, Dharmalingam, is the highly respected village chieftain. During his visit, Padayappa falls in love with Vasundhara, a timid maid working at Rajarathnam's house. Concurrently, Suryaprakash's younger sister, Neelambari, becomes deeply obsessed with Padayappa. Family relations fracture when Dharmalingam’s greedy younger brother, Ramalingam, demands a division of the ancestral property. Rather than break the family apart, Dharmalingam voluntarily surrenders his entire wealth and estate to Ramalingam. While leaving the village that evening, Dharmalingam dies from the shock of his brother's betrayal. Seizing the family's newfound fortune, Suryaprakash secretly marries Ramalingam's daughter, Meena, while Rajarathnam deeply humiliates Padayappa's grieving mother, Savitri.

Left with nothing but a seemingly barren piece of land, Padayappa begins clearing it for agriculture. He soon discovers the property contains a highly valuable mountain of solid granite. Ramalingam tries to swindle the land back through a deceptive contract, but Savitri uncovers the scheme and cancels the deal. After overpowering Ramalingam's henchmen, Padayappa establishes a booming granite mining business, becomes extraordinarily wealthy, and is eventually elected as the new village chieftain. Meanwhile, Neelambari discovers Padayappa’s love for Vasundhara and attempts self-harm. Her parents beg Savitri to arrange a marriage between Padayappa and Neelambari. However, to avenge the prior humiliations inflicted on her family, Savitri publicly arranges Padayappa's marriage to Vasundhara instead. Devastated by the public shame, Rajarathnam commits suicide. Neelambari repeatedly tries to sabotage the wedding but fails, and Padayappa marries Vasundhara. Consumed by hatred, Neelambari locks herself in her room, vowing vengeance while watching Padayappa’s wedding video on repeat.

Eighteen years later, Neelambari remains confined to her room, while Suryaprakash has risen to become the state Home Minister. Ramalingam loses his fortune due to poor business decisions and faces eviction. When Suryaprakash cold-heartedly refuses to assist his father-in-law to protect his own political standing, Padayappa steps in, financially salvages Ramalingam's family, and forgives his repentant uncle.

Neelambari orchestrates a new plot targeting Padayappa's eldest daughter, Anitha. She instructs Suryaprakash’s son, Chandru, to feign love for Anitha, who attends the same college. Unaware of this, Padayappa plans to marry Anitha to his nephew, Sarathi. Coached by Neelambari, Anitha publicly rejects the arranged match at the altar, declaring her love for Chandru. Padayappa vows to unite his daughter with her chosen partner by the next auspicious hour. He soon discovers that Chandru’s affection for Anitha has become genuine, despite his aunt's instructions. As Padayappa escorts the couple to a temple for their wedding, Neelambari and Suryaprakash pursue them in a high-speed chase, resulting in Suryaprakash's death in a car accident. Armed with a machine gun, Neelambari storms the temple to execute Padayappa. In the ensuing chaos, Padayappa dodges her gunfire while selflessly saving her from a charging bull. Utterly humiliated by his righteousness and her final defeat, Neelambari turns the gun on herself and commits suicide, vowing to kill him in her next birth. Padayappa peacefully concludes the wedding and prays for her departed soul.

== Cast ==
- Sivaji Ganesan as Dharmalingam
- Rajinikanth as Aarupadayappan (Padayappa)
- Ramya Krishnan as Neelambari
- Soundarya as Vasundhara
- Pritha Hari as Anitha
- Lakshmi as Savithri
- Sithara as Nandhini
- Radha Ravi as Rajarathnam
- Nassar as Suryaprakash
- Manivannan as Ramalingam
- Senthil as Alagapuri Azhagesan
- Abbas as Chandraprakash (Chandru)
- Anitha Venkat as Savitha
- Anu Mohan as Chinnarasu
- Ramesh Khanna as Murugesan
- Vadivukkarasi as Kamatchi
- Sathyapriya as Sivagami
- Mansoor Ali Khan as Krishnasamy Mudaliar
- Prakash Raj as I.G. Anandraj
- Vasu Vikram as Shanmugavel
- Raja Ravinder as Saravanavel
- Rajesh Kumar as Sivaraman
- Vijaya Sarathy as Sarathi
- Lavanya as Meena
- Ravi Raghavendra as Ravi Chellaiah (cameo appearance)
- Raj Bahadur as a minister and guest at Anitha's birthday party (cameo appearance)
- Kanal Kannan as Kannan
- Thalapathy Dinesh as a illicit liquor vendor
- A. K. Senthil as Chinnasamy
- Mohan Ram as Lawyer Rangarajan
- K. S. Ravikumar as a guest at Anitha's birthday (special appearance)
- Master Mahendran as a guest at Anitha's birthday (uncredited)
- Aravind Akash as a dancer in the "En Peru Padayappa" song (uncredited)
- Robo Shankar as a dancer in the "En Peru Padayappa" song (uncredited)

== Production ==
=== Development ===
In September 1998, Rajinikanth announced his next project, titled Padayappa, with K. S. Ravikumar as director. It also marks Ravikumar’s second collaboration with Rajinikanth after Muthu. The story of this film was taken in part from the historical Tamil novel, Ponniyin Selvan, by Kalki Krishnamurthy. Ravikumar had simultaneously discussed another script with Rajinikanth titled Hara, but the actor preferred to do Padayappa first. The title Padayappa is an adoption of Aarupadayappa — a sobriquet for Murugan and his six abodes.

The film was produced by K. Sathya Narayana, M. V. Krishna Rao, and H. Vittal Prasad under their production banner, Arunachala Cine Creations, along with P. L. Thenappan as co-producer. B. H. Tharun Kumar, Brinda & Lalitha Mani were the choreographers for the song sequences. A. M. Jyothi Krishna, son of producer A. M. Rathnam, was involved in the development of the film's script.

=== Casting ===
Today's audience expects novelty from film makers and stars. The success of [Neelambari] in Padayappa is an example of this. Action and reaction are the key factors for an artiste's success.

— Ramya Krishnan, in an interview with The Hindu in July 1999.

Rajinikanth was cast as the title character, a city-based engineer who returns to his ancestral village. Padayappa's cousin Neelambari is based on Nandini, a vengeful woman in Ponniyin Selvan. Meena and Nagma were earlier considered for the role, but Ramya Krishnan was ultimately cast. It was Ravikumar who suggested Krishnan's name for the role to Rajinikanth. She said she accepted the role because "it was opposite a superstar and that too the character was a negative one, no one was ready to do it, but I did it. I didn't have any second thoughts." According to Aishwarya Rai, she was also considered for the role, a claim Rajinikanth supports. However, Ravikumar denied the claim, saying she was actually considered for Hara.

Simran was considered for the role of Vasundhara, before the role went to Soundarya, who had earlier worked with Rajinikanth in Arunachalam (1997). Ravikumar revealed that the makers could not sign Simran due to her busy schedule and Meena was also considered for Vasundhara's role. Shalini was touted to play the role of Padayappa's sister, but the role eventually went to Sithara. Ramesh Kanna was chosen to play Murugesan after Rajinikanth was impressed with his performance in Unnidathil Ennai Koduthen (1998). Apart from acting, Kanna also worked as the film's co-director.

The characterisation of the older Padayappa – bearded, with sunglasses – is based on Rajinikanth's look as the character Manik Baashha in Baashha (1995). Vijayakumar was the initial choice for Padayappa's father before Sivaji Ganesan was cast; Padayappa was his penultimate release before Pooparika Varugirom (1999). His character's appearance, with a mutton-chop moustache, is based on a similar role he played in Thevar Magan (1992).

=== Filming ===
The scene where Rajinikanth as Padayappa pulls down a swing for him to sit on was based on a sequence in the Indian epic Ramayana, where Hanuman makes a chair for himself to sit on.

Principal photography began at the Raghavendra Kalyana Mandapam on 1 October 1998. The climax scene was one of the first to be shot, and was filmed in one take using two cameras. Around 2,000 extras were used for the scene. The car that was used in the scene which introduces Neelambari was a Toyota Sera, which belonged to Ravikumar. Ravikumar used the newly purchased car in the film at Rajinikanth's insistence. Filming also took place in Mysore. The Vadapalani-based shop, D. V. Nehru wigs, supplied the wigs that were sported by Ganesan. In a 2016 interview with The Hindu, Ravikumar mentioned that the scene where Padayappa uses his shawl to pull down a swing from the ceiling on which he sits after not being given a chair to sit by Neelambari, was inspired by a sequence in the Indian epic Ramayana, where Hanuman makes a seat using his tail after Ravana does not provide him a chair to sit.

"Kikku Yerudhey" was the last song sequence to be shot. For the sequence, Rajinikanth required Ravikumar to sport an outfit similar to Rajinikanth's, and enact a small part in the song. Rajinikanth also selected the part of the song where Ravikumar would make his appearance. After reluctantly agreeing to do the part, the sequence where they both appear together was filmed. Rajinikanth said he felt the shot did not look right, and re-takes for Ravikumar's sequence were done. After the re-takes were completed, Rajinikanth admitted that the first sequence was fine. When Ravikumar asked the cameraman why he had not told him earlier, the cameraman replied by saying that Rajinikanth wanted Ravikumar to do seven takes, to teach him a lesson for all the takes that Ravikumar had required of Rajinikanth. The filming was completed in 70 days.

== Themes ==
Writing for PopMatters, Ranjani Krishnakumar noted that Padayappa underlined Rajinikanth's political manoeuvres, evident when his character's lover sings "Kaadhal therdhalil kattil sinnathil vetri petru nee vaazgha" (In the election of love, with the symbol of bed, may you win and flourish). P. C. Balasubramanianram and N. Ramakrishnan, in their book, Grand Brand Rajini, said, "Padayappa, in one way, stands testimony to Rajini's life itself."

== Music ==
The film's soundtrack and background score were composed by A. R. Rahman, with lyrics by Vairamuthu. The soundtrack was released through Star Music. Strips of herbal rejuvenator capsules were sold along with the film's music cassettes. Before the film's release, Rahman asked Ravikumar if the soundtrack could be released in August 1999. Ravikumar informed Rahman that he had already discussed a release date with the press, and that Rahman would be blamed for any delay. To make the deadline, Rahman did a live re-recording of both the soundtrack and score to finish them on time.

The credits for the song "Vetri Kodi Kattu", sung by Palakkad Sreeram, initially went to Malaysia Vasudevan, who publicly stated that the credits for the song should have been attributed to Sreeram. Rahman requested the company who manufactured the audio cassettes to make the change. The song "Minsara Kanna" is based on the Vasantha raga, while "Vetri Kodi Kattu" is based on the Keeravani raga. "Minsara Kanna" established Srinivas as a leading singer in the film industry.

Srikanth Srinivasa of the Deccan Herald wrote, "The music by [Rahman], to Vairamuthu's lyrics, sounds good while the movie is on, though whether without the presence of [Rajinikanth] they would have, is another thing." S. Shiva Kumar of The Times of India was more critical of the soundtrack, and called it "lacklustre".

== Release ==
Padayappa was released theatrically on 10 April 1999 on the eve of Tamil New Year's Day. It was the first Tamil film to be released worldwide with over 200 prints, and 700,000 audio cassettes. The film's rights in Japan were sold for US$50,000, which was the highest an Indian film fetched for commercial release in 1999. Co-producer Thenappan registered the film posters as a Class 34 trademark in 1998, to be used for trademarking such items as beedis, cigarettes, cheroots and tobacco, making it the first instance of brand extension in the Tamil film industry. The pre-release business of the film's overseas rights amounted to ₹3 crore (equivalent to ₹14 crore or US$1.5 million in 2026). According to an estimate by trade analyst Sreedhar Pillai, the value of the theatrical and satellite rights for Padayappa was approximately ₹2 crore (equivalent to ₹9.4 crore or US$1.0 million in 2026).

=== Re-release ===
The film was re-released on 12 December 2025, coinciding with Rajinikanth's 75th birthday.

== Reception ==
=== Critical response ===
Ananda Vikatan, in its original review of the film dated 25 April 1999, wrote that the original stamp of Rajinikanth style could be seen in the film several times, adding that Ramya Krishnan had matched Rajinikanth and created a royal path separately, and concluded that the film was exclusively made for Rajinikanth's fans, giving it a rating of 41 out of 100. Srikanth Srinivasa of Deccan Herald gave the film a positive verdict, claiming that the "positive energy generated by this film is simply astounding", and labelling Rajinikanth's role as "terrific". Ganesh Nadar of Rediff also gave a positive review, praising Ramya Krishnan's performance in the film, and said that she "does a fantastic job", concluding, "... if you are a Rajni fan, this film is vintage stuff." K. P. S. of Kalki called the screenplay confusing and dragged, and the film has too many sub plots within short time but praised the performances of Rajinikanth and Ramya Krishnan. G. Ulaganathan of The New Indian Express praised the acting of Sivaji Ganesan and Ramya Krishnan but felt the film lacked a powerful villain and Rahman's score as routine. Malini Mannath of The Indian Express felt the film had nothing new to offer and was a rehash of Rajinikanth's old films and found Rahman's music mediocre but praised Krishnan's acting.

D. S. Ramanujam of The Hindu wrote, "SET TO please and enthral his fans, Arunachala Cine Creations Padaiappa is loaded with scenes and dialogue that will tremendously boost Rajinikanth's image. Experienced director K. S. Ravikumar goes beyond the accepted limits of cinematic allowances to make the venture of a Bade Appa, so will be the verdict of Rajini's fans" while praising the acting of cast, set design, cinematography, humour and music. S. Shiva Kumar of The Times of India was critical of the film's allusions to the actor's political career, stating that the film was "more style than substance". Sify praised Ramya Krishnan's performance but criticised Rajinikanth, stating that he had nothing to do but "be the Superman and spew dialogues". The reviewer concluded, "Technically the film has nothing much to offer."

=== Box office ===
Padayappa was a major box office success; according to The Tribune, it was the highest grossing Tamil film at that point. The film had a theatrical run of 100 days in 86 theatre centres, and was dubbed into Telugu under the title Narasimha. The dubbed version was also a commercially successful venture, and had a theatrical run of 50 days in 49 theatres.

=== Criticism from animal rights activists ===
Nikhil Talreja, an animal activist, criticised one scene from the film which shows a bull charging at Vasundhara, who is wearing a red saree. He accused the filmmakers of propagating the regressive myth that bulls charge at anything coloured red; the creatures are actually red–green colour blind. Talreja also criticised another scene propagating a similarly regressive myth, that snakes drink milk. He said, "Snakes are not mammals. They are reptiles [...] For snakes, this is biologically impossible. Snakes in general can open three times the actual size of their mouth and consume prey directly. They just don't drink milk."

=== Accolades ===
Ceremony	Category	Nominee(s)	Ref.
Dinakaran Cinema Awards	Best Picture	Padayappa	
Dinakaran Cinema Awards	Best Character Role Female	Ramya Krishnan	
Dinakaran Cinema Awards	Best Stunt Director	Kanal Kannan	
47th Filmfare Awards South	Best Actress – Tamil	Ramya Krishnan	
Tamil Nadu State Film Awards	Best Film (first prize)	K. S. Ravikumar	
Tamil Nadu State Film Awards	Best Actor	Rajinikanth	
Tamil Nadu State Film Awards	Best Actress (Special Prize)	Ramya Krishnan	
Tamil Nadu State Film Awards	Best Male Playback Singer	Srinivas	
Tamil Nadu State Film Awards	Best Make-up Artist	R. Sundaramoorthy	

== Potential sequel ==
Padayappa's final cut initially lasted for 19 reels, which was considered too lengthy. Rather than cut the film, Rajinikanth suggested to Ravikumar to allot two intervals. He screened the uncut film for actor Kamal Haasan, who told him not to go for two intervals. Haasan suggested Padayappa be edited in a way that would not disturb the storyline, so Ravikumar and the editor Thanigachalam managed to bring the film down to 14 reels. When Kumudam's reporter Kannan learnt about the scenes which had been cut, he asked Rajinikanth to release them as Padayappa's sequel. Rajinikanth immediately spoke to Ravikumar about the possibility, but was informed that those reels had been destroyed. In December 2025, Rajinikanth said a sequel was being discussed, and would be titled Neelambari: Padayappa 2 if it comes to fruition. In October 2026, Ravikumar said a script for a sequel had been developed over 15 days and would have revolved around Neelambari being reborn, but Rajinikanth refused to do it, feeling it needed more work.

== Legacy ==
With the success of Padayappa, Ramya Krishnan, who up to that point in time had only performed glamorous roles, showed her versatility as an actress. The character Neelambari reappears in Baba (2002), where she spots Baba (Rajinikanth) but sees him in her mind's eye in his Padayappa attire; she asks him the time. Her brother drags her away, and berates her for still not overcoming Padayappa. Ramya Krishnan and Nasser reprised their roles in this film. The success of Padayappa led to a film being named after one of its songs, Minsara Kanna (1999), also directed by Ravikumar where actress Khushbu appears in a negative role similar to Ramya Krishnan's in Padayappa; another song from the film, Vetri Kodi Kattu, became the name of a 2000 film directed by Cheran.

Ramya Krishnan played the role of Malini in the film Arumugam (2009), in which her character was similar to Neelambari. Her character in the television serial, Kalasam, was also named Neelambari. Actress Priyamani, in an interview with Prathibha Joy of The Times of India, stated her character in the Kannada film Ambareesha (2014), is similar to Neelambari. In Chetan Bhagat's novel, 2 States: The Story of My Marriage (2009), when Krish Malhotra, the protagonist, travels to Nungambakkam by auto rickshaw, the driver stops to worship a poster of Padayappa.

Some of the quotes from the film that became popular were:

- "Idhu Anbala Serntha Koottam" (This crowd was formed out of love) - reused in "The Punch Song" from the film, Aaha Kalyanam (2014).
- "En Vazhi Thani Vazhi." (My way is a unique way); - used as the title of a 2015 film directed by Shaji Kailas. It was also used as the title of a 2010 book on branding by Sridhar Ramanujam.
- "Poda Aandavane Nammapakkam Irukan’’ (God is on our side);
- "Adhigama Aasaipadra Aambalaiyum, Adhigama Kobapadra Pombalaiyum, Nalla Vazhndhadha Sarithirame Kidaiyathu" (There is no history of a man who desires too much or a woman who gets too angry living well),
- "Kashtapadama Edhuvum Kidaikkathu. Kashtapadama Kidaikirathu Ennikkum Nilakkathu" (One can gain nothing without working hard for it. That which is gained without hard work will not last forever);
- the English dialogue "Anger is the cause of all miseries. One should know how to control it, otherwise life will become miserable",
- Neelambari's dialogue "Vayasanalum un style um azhagum inum unna vitu pogala" (Even though you have grown older, your style and beauty has not left you) is recreated in a skit scene in the film K.D. (2019), with Kutty (played by Naga Vishal) and Karuppudurai (Mu Ramaswamy) disguised as Neelambari and Padayappa respectively.

Scenes and dialogues from the film were parodied in various other films such as Thirupathi Ezhumalai Venkatesa (1999), En Purushan Kuzhandhai Maadhiri (2001), Annai Kaligambal (2003), Sivaji: The Boss (2007). Vel (2007), Siva Manasula Sakthi (2009), Malai Malai (2009), Vanakkam Chennai (2013), and All in All Azhagu Raja (2013).

Padayappa was also parodied in the Star Vijay comedy series Lollu Sabha, in an episode appropriately named Vadayappa.

To celebrate the 39th anniversary of Rajinikanth in the film industry, Digitally Inspired Media, a Chennai-based digital agency, made 39 posters of some of his films, in which Padayappa was included. The posters feature one "punch" line from the film, a representative image, and the year of the film's release. On Rajinikanth's 64th birthday, an agency named Minimal Kollywood Posters designed posters of Rajinikanth's films, in which the Minion characters from the Despicable Me franchise are dressed as Rajinikanth. The digital art was hand drawn on a digital pad by Gautham Raj. One of the posters depicted a minion sitting on a swing and dressed like Rajinikanth's character in Padayappa, reminiscent of the swing scene. In the 2022 film Naai Sekar, many of the animal characters are named after Rajinikanth films, including a labrador dog named Padayappa.

On 13 June 2025, the then Chief Minister of Tamil Nadu, M. K. Stalin, referring to a comic scene from Padayappa, said, “There is a dialogue—he is the groom, but the shirt he is wearing is mine. Similarly, the Union Government may launch the schemes, but we [Tamil Nadu] are responsible for providing the funds". The next day, there was a follow-up post from his Twitter handle, containing two screenshots from the said scene. Nearly two weeks later, he repeated the reference in a speech.

== Bibliography ==
- Balasubramanianram, P. C.; Ramakrishnan, N. (2012). Grand Brand Rajini. Rupa Publications. ISBN 978-81-2912-059-5.
- Bhagat, Chetan (2009). 2 States: The Story of My Marriage. Sandesh S. ISBN 978-81-291-1530-0.
- Dhananjayan, G. (2011). "Padayappa". The Best of Tamil Cinema, 1931 to 2010: 1977–2010. Galatta Media. ISBN 978-81-921043-0-0.
- Ganesan, Sivaji; Narayana Swamy, T. S. (2007) [2002]. Autobiography of an Actor: Sivaji Ganesan, October 1928 – July 2001. Sivaji Prabhu Charities Trust. OCLC 297212002.
- Mathai, Kamini (2009). A. R. Rahman: The Musical Storm. Penguin Books. ISBN 978-0-670-08371-8.
- Ramachandran, Naman, ed. (2012). Rajinikanth 12.12.12: A Birthday Special. Kasturi & Sons Ltd.
- Ramachandran, Naman (2014) [2012]. Rajinikanth: The Definitive Biography. Penguin Books. ISBN 978-81-8475-796-5.
- Vasudevan, Ravi (2011). The Melodramatic Public: Film Form and Spectatorship in Indian Cinema. Palgrave Macmillan. ISBN 978-0-230-24764-2.
