= Ganga Gowri =

Ganga Gowri may refer to:

- Ganga Gowri (1973 film), a Tamil-language film directed by P. R. Panthulu, starring Gemini Ganesan and Jayalalithaa
- Ganga Gowri (1997 film), a Tamil-language film directed by Madheswaran, starring Arun Vijay and Sangita
