= Anbudan =

2000 Indian film

- VCD cover
- Directed by: T. Indrakumar
- Written by: T. Indrakumar
- Produced by: K. R. Senthilkumar; R. N. Elango; S. Arunachalam
- Starring: Arun Kumar; Ramba; Meena
- Cinematography: K. G. Shrinivas
- Edited by: R. T. Annadurai
- Music by: Jai
- Distributed by: 21st Century Film Gallery
- Release date: 15 November 2000
- Running time: 140 minutes
- Country: India
- Language: Tamil

Anbudan (transl. With Love) is a 2000 Tamil language romantic drama film written and directed by T. Indrakumar and starring Arun Vijay (known at the time as Arunkumar) and Rambha. It was released on 15 November 2000.

== Plot ==
Sathya (Arun Vijay) is a very good artist and is known for his art. He paints pictures and sells them on the road where he meets a lot of trouble. That's where he gets to know of Thilottamal over the phone. He starts searching for her, but to no use.

In between, Nimmi (Rambha) comes as a model and falls in love with Arun, but he declines it for Thilottamal. He even thinks Meena is as mentally disturbed as Thilottamal, but she is not.

Finally, Thilottamal writes a letter to Arun that she is going to die as she is so horrible to see and that she does not deserve his love. Arun runs all the way to the cremation ground to see her at least once, but by that time, they have cremated her. Arun goes to the beach and sits with tears in his eyes.

== Cast ==
- Arunkumar as Sathya
- Rambha as Nimmi
- Meena as Shanthi (Cameo)
- Charle as Sathya's friend
- Dhamu as Sathya's friend
- Vaiyapuri as Sathya's friend
- Balaji as Sathya's friend
- Vinu Chakravarthy as police officer
- Anandaraj as Sathya's father
- Fathima Babu as Sathya's mother
- Madhan Bob as press reporter
- Vellai Subbaiah
- Bayilvan Ranganathan
- Balu Anand
- Chelladurai
- Kovai Senthil

== Production ==
The film was directed by T. Indrakumar who earlier directed Sandhippoma. Meena agreed to do cameo appearance for this film out of gratitude for Vijayakumar's family who introduced her as child artist in Nenjangal. A song sequence was shot at Vijaya Studios.

== Soundtrack ==
Soundtrack was composed by debutant Jai.

Track listing
No.	Title	Singer(s)	Length
1.	"Andha Suriyane"	Shankar Mahadevan, Mahalakshmi Iyer
2.	"Oru Kadhal Devathai"	Hariharan
3.	"Eve Tease"	Sukhwinder Singh
4.	"Kadhal airways"	Udit Narayan
5.	"Kamban Enge"	Shankar Mahadevan

== Release and reception ==
Cheran attended the film's premiere show and appreciated Arun Vijay's performance.

Visual Dasan of Kalki called the film as good start for director Indrakumar but panned Annadurai's editing due to dragged scenes. Malini Mannath of Chennai Online wrote, "Though the director has managed to maintain an element of surprise throughout, the script has many loose ends". Indiainfo wrote, "Large amounts have been spent on the picturisation of songs and the music by debutant Music Director Jai is okay but falters in rerecording. Camerawork by Srinivas is average". Malathi Rangarajan of The Hindu wrote, "The title has a poetic touch and the story, an interestingly new angle. It is the screenplay that lacks crispness".
