= Sullan =

2004 Indian film by Ramana

- Poster
- Directed by: Ramana
- Written by: Ramana
- Produced by: Salem Chandrasekharan
- Starring: Dhanush; Sindhu Tolani; Manivannan; Pasupathy
- Cinematography: N. Raghav
- Edited by: Suresh Urs
- Music by: Vidyasagar
- Production company: Sri Saravanaa Creations
- Release date: 23 July 2004
- Running time: 140 minutes
- Country: India
- Language: Tamil

Sullan (Note: Spelt Sulaan onscreen.) is a 2004 Indian Tamil-language action film written and directed by Ramana. The film stars Dhanush in the main lead role along with Sindhu Tolani, Manivannan, Pasupathy and Easwari Rao among others. It was released on 23 July 2004 and became a commercial failure.

== Plot ==
Subramani, known as Sullan among his friends, is the son of Mani, a corporation garbage lorry driver. A first-year college student, his only objective in life is to have fun with his friends. He falls in love with Kavya. Soori is a moneylender who charges atrocious rates and then goes after those who fail to pay him back. When Soori's actions start to affect his family and friends, Sullan strikes back.

== Cast ==
- Dhanush as Subramani (Sullan)
- Sindhu Tolani as Kavya
- Manivannan as Mani, Sullan's father
- Pasupathy as Soori
- Easwari Rao as Karpagam, Sullan’s elder sister
- Delhi Ganesh
- Bava Lakshmanan
- Vasu Vikram
- Kalairani
- Thennavan
- Muthukaalai
- Besant Ravi
- Sanghavi as Lakshmi Mani (special appearance)

== Production ==
This was the first film produced by Salem A. Chandrasekhar who previously worked as distributor. The song "Yaaro Nee" was shot at Christ Church Gardens at Australia while the song "Kavithai Iravu" was shot at Auckland. A fight scene featuring Dhanush and Pasupathi fighting by hanging upside down was shot at Campa Cola Grounds.

== Soundtrack ==
The soundtrack was composed by Vidyasagar. The song "Kavidhai Iravu" is partially based a keyboard interlude from the song "Nuvve Naa Swasa" from Okariki Okaru.

Song title	Singers	Lyrics
"Kavidhai Iravu"	K. S. Chitra, Karthik	Yugabharathi
"Sandakozhi"	Shankar Mahadevan, Tippu	Na. Muthukumar
"Yaaro Nee"	Hariharan, Sujatha Mohan	Kabilan
"Adho Varaa"	Harini, Pushpavanam Kuppusamy	Pa. Vijay
"Kilu Kiluppana"	Adnan Sami, Premji Amaran, Pop Shalini	Pa. Vijay
"Siragu Mulaitha	Madhu Balakrishnan	Arivumathi
"Kilu Kiluppana 2"	Karthik, Premji Amaran, Pop Shalini	Pa. Vijay

== Critical reception ==
Sify wrote "Ramana's narrative and script are absurd and his attempt to make Dhanush a superstar material has failed miserably. Sullan is all sound and no fury". Malini Mannath of Chennai Online wrote "Director Ramana, who gave a success with his debut film 'Thirumalai', seems to lose control over his script, characters and artistes from the early scenes itself. The whole scenario being crass and loud, subtlety seems to be the last thing on the director's mind." A critic from The Hindu wrote that "Just because the role of a college goer from a lower middle class family suits Dhanush to a T, he should not be made to repeat the socio-economic scenario in film after film". Visual Dasan of Kalki criticised the characters of hero, heroine and villain behaving like hyper active patients, concluding the film had no story or whatsoever. Deccan Herald wrote "The director tries to project Dhanush as a super-man but with movies like Spider-man hitting the screen, Sullan pales in comparison".
