= Vedha (2008 film) =

- VCD cover
- Directed by: R. Nithyakumar
- Written by: R. Nithyakumar (dialogues)
- Screenplay by: Vasu Bhaskar
- Story by: Vasu Bhaskar
- Produced by: Vasu Bhaskar
- Starring: Arun Vijay; Sheela
- Cinematography: Vijay Gopal
- Edited by: V. Jaishankar
- Music by: Srikanth Deva
- Production company: Connect Film Media
- Distributed by: Connect Film Media
- Release date: 28 March 2008
- Running time: 138 minutes
- Country: India
- Language: Tamil

Vedha (/ˈveɪðɑː/) is a 2008 Indian Tamil-language action drama film directed by R. Nithyakumar, starring Arun Vijay and Sheela. The music was composed by Srikanth Deva. The film was released on 28 March 2008.

== Plot ==
Vijay is crazy about his younger brother Vadhan. Then, in a college election, he impersonates the police officer on duty, batters a group of goondas, threatens other candidates, and forces them to withdraw, only so that brother gets elected. But by this act, Vijay earns the wrath of the local gangster Sathya.

In the meantime, Vijay meets Vedha and after a few meetings, both of them develop an affinity towards each other. Simultaneously, Vijay learns that Vadhan is in love. When Vadhan feels hesitant and unsure of success in his love, Vijay elects to help him, as usual. They visit a mall where, predictably, Vadhan introduces Vedha as the light of his life. Hiding his disappointment Vijay congratulates his brother and with his convincing dialogue, persuades Vedha to marry Vadhan. The fairy-tale wedding takes place, but a shocking truth revealed during the wedding night shatters the lives of Vijay, Vedha, and Vadhan.

== Cast ==
- Arun Vijay as Vijay
- Sheela as Vedha
- Jaivardhan as Vadhan
- Seetha as Vijay's mother
- Satyaprakash as Sathya
- Karunas
- Mayilsamy as Vijay's friend
- Bose Venkat as ACP S. Veera Pandi
- Madhan Bob as College Principal
- Singamuthu
- Sampath Ram as Inspector Kalaiyarasan

Uncredited

- Ambani Shankar
- Nellai Siva as Tea Shop Owner
- Bonda Mani
- Vijay Ganesh
- Srikanth Deva in a special appearance
- Sarath Babu as Vijay's father (in portrait)

== Production ==
The film began production in late 2006, with the muhurat shot being taken at the Governor's mansion. The story of Vedha was based on the experiences of Vasu Bhaskar's friend, although he took some liberties while writing the screenplay. Nithyakumar explained the film's theme: "Sacrifice is a noble sentiment but it is not possible for one to give up everything for others".

== Soundtrack ==
The soundtrack was composed by Srikanth Deva.

Song	Singers	Lyrics
"Azhage Azhage"	KK, Chinmayi	Thanga. Senthilkumar
"Ayyo Azhage"	Udit Narayan, Pop Shalini	P. Vijay
"Chikku Bukku Rayilu"	Gana Bala	R. Nithyakumar
"Ninaitha Paavam"	Vijay Yesudas	Vasu Bhaskar
"Rasikkum Seemane"	Anuradha Sriram	Yugabharathi
"Vilakkinil"	Vijay Yesudas	V. T. Thanga Bhaskar
"Achamillai Achamillai"	Tippu, Archith	Vijay Sagar
"Vannarpetta"	Sabash, Thanga Bhaskar	Paarthi Bhaskar
"Ennai Naan"	Unni Menon	Vasu Gokila

== Critical reception ==
Pavithra Srinivasan of Rediff.com wrote "It's neither time-pass nor meaningful cinema; Vedha stumbles somewhere in between." The Hindu wrote, "Dialogue and direction are Nityakumar's; story and screenplay, Vasu Basker's. When the two latter departments fail to impress, the former can do little. 'Veda' is an example". Sify wrote, "Veda is an old fashioned corny tale full of mush and melodrama one associates with a 60's film and is predictable and boring".
