= Tamil Nadu State Film Award for Best Make-up Artist =

Indian film award

The Tamil Nadu State Film Award for Best Make-up Artist is given by the state government of Tamil Nadu as part of its annual Tamil Nadu State Film Awards for Tamil-language (Kollywood) films.

== The list ==
Here is a list of the award winners and the films for which they won.

Year	Make-up Artist	Film
2015	Sabari Girishan	36 Vayadhinile & Irudhi Suttru
2014	Pattanam Mohammed Rashid	Kaaviya Thalaivan
2013	Rajendran	Ramanujan
2012	T. Dinakaran	Sundarapandian
2011	Dasarathan	Avan Ivan
2010	Manohar	Boss Engira Bhaskaran
2009	V. Shanmugham	Kanthaswamy
2008	Michael Westmore	Dasavathaaram
2007	Rajendran	Periyar
2006		
2005		Anniyan
2004		
2003		
2002	V. P. Rajan	Anbe Sivam
2001	Nageshwara Rao	Dhill
2000	Girisan	Seenu
1999	Sundaramoorthy	Padayappa
1998	Raju	Veeram Vilaindha Mannu
1997	Shanmugam	Aahaa..!
1996	K. M. Sarathkumar	Avvai Shanmugi

== See also ==
- Tamil cinema
- Cinema of India
