= R. Sundaramoorthy =

Indian make-up artist and actor

- Born: 1947
- Other name: Sundaramoorthy
- Occupations: Make-up artist, actor
- Years active: 1966–present
- Awards: Kalaimamani Award (1999)

R. Sundaramoorthy is an Indian make-up artist and actor, best known for his work in the film Padayappa (1999) and being the first make-up artist for Rajinikanth.

== Career ==
Sundaramoorthy began his career as an assistant to his father and grandfather. He worked as a make-up artist for several artists including Kamal Haasan, Rajinikanth, Saritha, Thiagarajan, Murali, J. P. Chandrababu, Poornima Jayaram, Sujatha, Sathyaraj and Aravind Swamy. Sundaramoorthy has worked with Rajinikanth since the beginning of the latter's career starting with Apoorva Raagangal. He continued working with Rajinikanth for his 100th film Sri Raghavendrar (1985), and went on to win the Tamil Nadu State Film Award for Best Make-up Artist for his work in Padayappa. Sundaramoorthy continued working with Rajinikanth until Chandramukhi (2005). He was a frequent collaborator with K. Balachander and Mani Ratnam.

== Filmography ==
=== Make-up artist ===
- Sadhu Mirandal (1966; assistant)
- Madras to Pondicherry (1966; assistant)
- Thamarai Nenjam (1968)
- Poova Thalaiya (1969)
- Shanti Nilayam (1969)
- Iru Kodugal (1969)
- Velli Vizha (1972)
- Aaina (1974) (Hindi)
- Apoorva Raagangal (1975)
- Anthuleni Katha (1976) (Telugu)
- Manmadha Leelai (1976)
- Moondru Mudichu (1976)
- Avargal (1977)
- Ek Duuje Ke Liye (1981) (Hindi)
- Raja Paarvai (1981)
- Netrikkan (1981)
- Sanam Teri Kasam (1982) (Hindi)
- Moondru Mugam (1982)
- Sagara Sangamam (1983) (Telugu)
- Thanga Magan (1983)
- Ek Nai Paheli (1984) (Hindi)
- Pagal Nilavu (1985)
- Sri Raghavendrar (1985)
- Idaya Kovil (1985)
- Mouna Ragam (1986)
- Agni Natchathiram (1988)
- Geethanjali (1989)
- Anjali (1990)
- Thalapathi (1991)
- Annaamalai (1992)
- Roja (1992)
- Thiruda Thiruda (1993)
- Veera (1994)
- Baashha (1995)
- Bombay (1995)
- Muthu (1995)
- Iruvar (1997)
- Arunachalam (1997)
- Dil Se.. (1998) (Hindi)
- Padayappa (1999)
- Alai Payuthey (2000)
- Kannathil Muthamittal (2002)
- Aayutha Ezhuthu (2004)
- Chandramukhi (2005)
- Periyar (2007)
- Raavanan (2010)
- Pulanaivu (2019; unreleased)

=== Actor ===
Films

Year	Film	Role	Notes
1968	Thamarai Nenjam		Uncredited
1978	Thappida Thala	Sarasu's customer	Bilingual film; uncredited
1984	Pudhiavan		
1985	Mugila Mallige		Kannada film
1985	Sindhu Bhairavi	JKB's driver	
1990	Oru Veedu Iru Vaasal	Himself	Guest appearance
1991	Azhagan	Manoharan	
1995	Muthu	Man asking for blessings from Muthu's father	uncredited
1999	Poovellam Kettuppar	EB worker	
1999	Hello		
2000	Alai Payuthey	Nadar	
2000	Kandukondain Kandukondain	House owner	
2001	12B	Sadasivam	
2003	Thirumalai	Arasu's victim	
2004	Udhaya	Niranjan	
2004	Aayutha Ezhuthu	Press Reporter	uncredited

Television

Year	Series	Role	Notes
1998	Premi	M. S. Bhaskar's assistant	
2001	Marmadesam – Sorna Regai	Meenakshi's father	
2003	Anni		

== Awards and nominations ==
Year	Award	Category	Work	Result	Ref.
1999	Tamil Nadu State Film Awards	Best Make-up Artist	Won	Padayappa	

=== Honours ===
- Kalaimamani Award - 1999
