= Nanditha Jennifer =

Indian actress

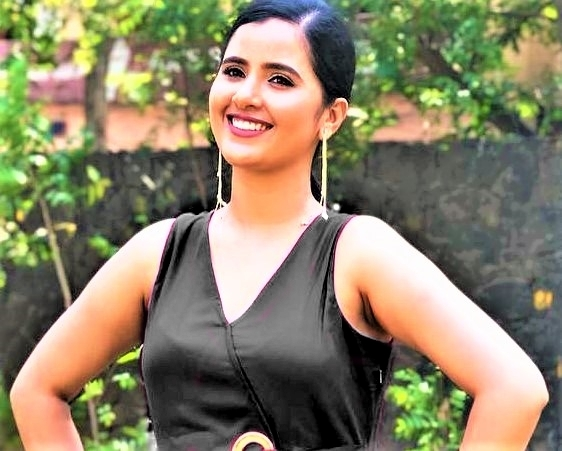
- Born: Jennifer; 12 May 1979 (age 47); Chennai, Tamil Nadu
- Other name: Jeni
- Occupations: Actress, choreographer
- Spouse: Kasi Viswanathan (m. 2007)
- Children: 2 (Shantanav, Ghayaan)
- Parents: Chinna Master (father); Judaline Thanda Anthony (mother)

Nanditha Jennifer is an Indian actress and choreographer who has appeared in the Tamil film industry. The actress won critical acclaim for her performance in Eera Nilam (2003) and later appeared in other Tamil and Telugu language films.

== Career ==
The daughter of film choreographer Chinna, Jennifer first appeared in a song in Vasanth's Yai! Nee Romba Azhaga Irukey! (2002), before starring in S. A. Chandrasekhar's slasher film Mutham (2002) in an ensemble cast, under her original name of Jennifer. She featured in the film alongside actors Nagendra Prasad and Arun Vijay, but it received negative reviews and performed poorly at the box office. she then appeared in several films throughout 2003, notably starring in Bharathiraja's Eera Nilam, though critics criticized her performance as "comical". She then also appeared in two straight-to-video films alongside Pandiarajan, while another film titled Kaadhal Jaathi directed by Kasthuri Raja remained unreleased after running into financial trouble. Jennifer made several appearances in item numbers in the middle of the 2000s, as she found it difficult to be selected for lead roles.

Jennifer married Kasi Viswanathan, an assistant cinematographer to U. K. Senthil Kumar. Jennifer and Kasi Viswanathan got married in March 2007 at Vadapalani Temple.

In 2013, she made a comeback under her original name in the film Ravana Desam starring newcomers, which told the tale of missing refugees during the 2009 Sri Lankan Civil War.

She has featured in popular shows like Bhuvaneswari, Nagavalli, Mr & Mrs Khiladis Season 02 and Lakshmi Stores.

== Filmography ==
Films

Year	Film	Role	Language	Notes
2000	Rhythm	Dancer in song "Thaniye"	Tamil	Special appearance
2002	Yai! Nee Romba Azhaga Irukey!	Yamini	Tamil	Special appearance
2002	Arputham	Ashok's sister	Tamil	
2002	Maaran	Dancer	Tamil	Special appearance
2002	Jjunction	Dancer	Tamil	Special appearance
2002	University	Dancer	Tamil	Special appearance
2002	Mutham	Aarthi	Tamil	
2003	Indru Mudhal	Jenni	Tamil	
2003	Parthiban Kanavu	Dancer	Tamil	Special appearance
2003	Eera Nilam	Sornam	Tamil	Lead heroine
2003	Success	Dancer	Tamil	Special appearance
2003	Sindhamal Sitharamal	Janaki	Tamil	Lead heroine
2004	Dharma	Sakunthala	Kannada	credited as Manisha
2004	Pethi Sollai Thattathea	Jancy	Tamil	Straight-to-video
2004	Thiru Thuru	Madhavi	Tamil	Straight-to-video
2004	Seshadri Naidu	Sathyabama	Telugu	Lead role
2004	Jananam	Dancer	Tamil	Special appearance
2005	Nuvvostanante Nenoddantana	Dolly	Telugu	
2005	Arinthum Ariyamalum	Dancer	Tamil	Special appearance
2006	Azhagiya Asura	Pavithra	Tamil	Special Appearance
2006	Parijatham	Vasumathi	Tamil	Guest appearance
2006	Dharmapuri	Dancer	Tamil	Item song Special appearance
2006	Naalai	Dancer	Tamil	Item song Special appearance
2006	Imsai Arasan 23rd Pulikecei	Dancer	Tamil	Item song Special appearance
2007	Vasantham Vanthachu	Gayathri	Tamil	Lead heroine
2007	Kasu Irukkanum	Vijayalakshmi (Viji)	Tamil	Lead heroine
2007	Thiru Ranga	Deepa	Tamil	
2007	Ninaithu Ninaithu Parthen	Reena	Tamil	
2007	Pirappu	Dancer	Tamil	Special appearance
2007	Aarya	Dancer	Tamil	Special appearance
2008	Pachai Nirame	Shanthi	Tamil	
2013	Pavitra	Dancer	Telugu	Item song Special appearance
2013	Ravana Desam	Abhinaya	Tamil	
2014	Chinnan Chiriya Vanna Paravai	Dancer	Tamil	Special appearance
2015	Where Is Vidya Balan	Dancer	Telugu	Item song Special appearance
2017	Palli Paruvathile	Dancer	Tamil	Item song Special appearance
2018	Naa Route Separetu	Dancer	Telugu	Item song Special appearance
2019	Kudimagan	Chellakannu	Tamil	
2021	Jail	Mariapushpam	Tamil	
2022	Maha	Alex's daughter	Tamil	Uncredited

=== Television ===
Year	Title	Role	Channel
2008–2010	Nagavalli	Nagavalli / Sneha	Sun TV
2008–2010	Bhuvaneswari	Bhuvaneswari	Sun TV
2018	Mr & Mrs Khiladis Season 02	Contestant	Zee Tamil
2018–2019	Lakshmi Stores	Kamala	Sun TV
2019	Lakshmi Stores	Kamala	Gemini TV
2020–2021	Amman	Saradha	Colors Tamil
2020–2021	Baakiyalakshmi	Raadhika	Star Vijay
2021	Rowdy Baby	Contestant	Sun TV
2024	Karthigai Deepam	Ramya	Zee Tamil
2025–Present	Thirumangalyam	Kavitha	Zee Tamil
