= Kannaal Pesavaa =

- Title card
- Directed by: M. Raaj Khanna
- Written by: M. Raaj Khanna
- Screenplay by: M. Raaj Khanna
- Story by: M. Raaj Khanna
- Produced by: P. R. C. Gopal
- Starring: Arun Vijay; Suvalakshmi; Goundamani
- Cinematography: C Vijayasri
- Edited by: M. N. Raja
- Music by: Deva
- Production company: Sri Raja Rajeshwari Combine
- Release date: 21 August 2000
- Running time: 136 minutes
- Country: India
- Language: Tamil

Kannaal Pesavaa (transl. Should I talk through my eyes) is a 2000 Indian Tamil-language romantic drama film directed by Raj Khanna. The film featured Arun Vijay (credited as Arun Kumar) alongside Suvalakshmi, while Goundamani and Senthil play supporting roles. The film, which had music composed by Deva, opened in August 2000.

== Cast ==
- Arun Vijay as Arun
- Suvalakshmi as Poongodi
- Goundamani as Clinton
- Senthil as Nelson Mandela
- Vinu Chakravarthy as Arun's grandfather
- Manorama as Poongodi's grandmother
- Mansoor Ali Khan as Mookiah
- Nizhalgal Ravi as Doctor
- Kumarimuthu
- Balu Anand as Poongodi's grandfather
- Halwa Vasu
- Bonda Mani
- King Kong
- Lavanya as Sandhya
- K. S. Ravikumar as Himself (Guest appearance)
- Alphonsa as Iteù Number (Special appearance)

== Soundtrack ==
The soundtrack was composed by Deva and lyrics were written by M. Raaj Khanna.

Track list
Title	Artists	Duration
"Kann Azhage"	Hariharan	05:48
"Chinna Purave"	Unnikrishnan	05:08
"Mathalatha Kottungadi"	Anuradha Sriram	05:15
"Nenjukulla Thudikira"	Sujatha	05:28
"Thottachinungi Pola"	Krishnaraj, Swarnalatha	04:42
"Maami Siricha"	Sabesh, Malgudi Subha	04:25
"Kann Azhage" (Version 2)	Sujatha	05:48

== Release and reception ==
Initially scheduled for an April release in 2000, the film was delayed due to the presence of bigger budget films. The film opened in August 2000. A critic from India Info said, "Kannal Pesava is director Raj Kaana’s attempt to woo the youth with a mushy love story in the wake of Kushy. But he only ends up giving a further setback to the film’s leading man Arun Kumar, who desperately needs a foothold in the industry". Chennai Online wrote "What do you call a film that has nothing going for it? Either by way of freshness in narration or script or by way of an interesting star cast? That it is bland? 'Kannal Pesava' has an unexciting cast, insipid narration, and a lacklustre screenplay. The comedy team of Goundamani and Senthil makes matters worse. The director probably thought that just by giving the duo the names of Clinton and Mandela he could tickle the audience".
