= Ravana Desam =

2013 Indian film by Ajay Nuthakki

- Theatrical release poster
- Directed by: Ajay Nuthakki
- Produced by: Laxmikanth Nadendla
- Starring: Ajay Andrews Nuthakki; Jennifer; Ramesh Babu; Sandesh
- Cinematography: VK Ramaraj
- Edited by: Karthik Srinivas
- Music by: Siva R Nandigam
- Release date: 14 November 2013
- Running time: 125 minutes
- Country: India
- Language: Tamil

Ravana Desam (transl. The Land of Ravana) is a 2013 Indian Tamil-language film written and directed by Ajay Nuthakki. The film is based on the refugees missing during the 2009 Sri Lankan civil war.

== Plot ==
The film begins in Sri Lanka during the civil war between the Sri Lanka Army and the Liberation Tigers of Tamil Eelam, who are fighting for a separate nation for Tamils. The movie tells the story of refugees who went missing while trying to escape the fighting by crossing the border with illegal boats to Tamil Nadu in India. The film is based on true incidents that happened during the voyage.

== Cast ==
- Ajay as Victor
- Jennifer as Abhinaya
- Allu Ramesh
- Santhosh
- Koutalya
- Bharathi Rao
- Serisha
- Prabhakar
- Mainar Babu

== Production ==
Nuthakki spent almost four years on the film, with two years dedicated to research to get the facts right. Nuthakki stated that: "Even though my film is based on true events, I have built the premise on a very simple theme that humans are still animals and are likely to become extinct soon. What happened in Sri Lanka in 2009 was described by the United Nations as a bloodbath." He said that the time he invested in working on the film was worth it. The cast and crew for the production were on the sea filming for almost 120 days, with many of the actors getting sea sickness.

== Reception ==
The Times of India wrote, "Throughout the film, we constantly wonder what a better filmmaker might have done with this terrific material".

== See also ==
- Sri Lankan civil war in popular culture
