= Murai Mappillai =

- Poster
- Directed by: Sundar C
- Written by: Sundar C
- Dialogue by: K. Selva Bharathy
- Produced by: K. Prabhakaran
- Starring: Arunkumar; Kirthika
- Cinematography: U. K. Senthil Kumar
- Edited by: Lancy–Mohan
- Music by: Swararaj
- Production company: Anbalaya Films
- Release date: 15 December 1995
- Running time: 140 minutes
- Country: India
- Language: Tamil

Murai Mappillai (transl. Eligible to marry groom) is a 1995 Indian Tamil-language romantic comedy film directed and co-written by Sundar C. The film stars newcomers Arun Vijay (known at the time as Arunkumar) and Kirthika, with Rajashree, Manivannan, K. Prabakaran, Goundamani and Senthil playing supporting roles. It was released on 15 December 1995.

== Plot ==
Kai Ezhuthu Gounder and Kai Naattu Gounder are the village's bigwig and best friends. Their children Raja and Indhu, who are classmates, hate each other, and quarrel continually. In contrast, their fathers want them to get married. Sorna, a dancer, comes to their village to separate the two friends. Raja and Indhu finally fall in love with each other. Sorna seduces the two friends and creates a conflict between them. In the past, Kai Ezhuthu Gounder and Kai Naattu Gounder attempted to rape Sorna's sister but before it happened, she chose to commit suicide. Since that day, Sorna wanted to take revenge. Raja and Indhu are then distraught by their fathers. Sorna only wanted to punish Kai Ezhuthu Gounder and Kai Naattu Gounder but not the young lovers, so she comes to their rescue. What transpires later forms the crux of the story.

== Cast ==
- Arunkumar as Raja
- Kirthika as Indhu
- Rajashree as Sorna
- Manivannan as Kai Ezhuthu Gounder, Raja's father
- K. Prabhakaran as Kai Naattu Gounder, Indhu's father
- Goundamani as Ramesh
- Senthil as Suresh
- Kalaranjini as Raja's mother
- Vinodhini
- Aasha
- Pandu as Hitler, college principal
- Suresh Chakravarthy
- Halwa Vasu as Pakri
- Vichu Vishwanath
- Kottai Perumal
- Kullamani
- Gundu Kalyanam
- Karuppu Subbiah
- Bonda Mani
- Omakuchi Narasimhan
- Idichapuli Selvaraj
- Jaguar Thangam
- Prabhu Solomon as Chinnasamy (uncredited role)

== Production ==
The film marked the introduction of Arun Vijay, son of actor Vijayakumar into films. He was credited as Arunkumar. The first film Arunkumar signed was Love Story. But as its music composer, A. R. Rahman, was very busy, producer K. Prabakaran signed him up for Murai Mappillai directed by Sundar C. During the making of the film, Sundar fell out with the makers, and the venture was finished by Anbalaya Prabhakaran. Prabhu Solomon who went on to direct films like Mynaa (2010) and Kumki (2012) completed the post-production works of the film.

== Soundtrack ==
The music was composed by Swararaj, who debuted in Tamil cinema as composer with this film. The lyrics were written by Vaali and Bharati Puthran.

Song	Singer(s)	Duration
"Akkali Magale"	Rajesh Krishnan	1:43
"Anga Paar"	Mano	3:52
"Ezhulagam"	T. L. Maharajan	2:27
"Maama Maama"	Manivannan, K. Prabakaran, Mano, Sujatha Mohan	4:09
"Sikkunu Mutham"	Shahul Hameed, Swarnalatha, Chorus	3:14
"Thendral Kaatre"	S. Janaki	3:57
"Unnai Marunthu"	P. Unni Krishnan, K. S. Chithra	4:00

== Reception ==
D. S. Ramanujam of The Hindu wrote, "The new hero is fairly tall and muscular and is not camera shy. He is good in fight scenes also and natural in the romance sequences. He has made good use of the exposure."
