= Lavanya Devi =

Indian actor

- Occupation: Actress
- Years active: 1996–present
- Spouse: Prasanna (m. 2023)

Lavanya Devi is an Indian actress who has appeared in Tamil films and serials.

== Career ==
She rose to fame portraying supporting roles in Tamil films during the 1990s, before moving on to work in television in the 2000s.

Early notable roles she appeared in includes her character in K. S. Ravikumar's Padayappa (1999), where she played the wife of Nassar's character, Jodi (1999), Sethu (1999), Sangamam (1999) and Thenali (2000), where she portrayed an interviewer. She also did some roles as the lead actress, notably in the Malayalam film, Aram Indriyam (2001). She subsequently went on to appear in over one hundred films, mainly in supporting roles. She has been as a supporting actress in Naan Than Bala (2014), a tale of Dharma's triumph over evil that has received mixed reviews from critics.

Lavanya moved into work in television roles and notably portrayed a princess in the historical drama series, Romapuri Pandian.

== Filmography ==
=== Tamil films ===
Year	Film	Role	Notes
1996	Kumbakonam Gopalu		Uncredited role
1997	Devathai		
1997	Surya Vamsam	Swapna	
1998	Kondattam	Purushothaman's daughter	
1998	Jeans	Pechiappan's prospective bride	Uncredited role
1998	Iniyavale	Latha	
1998	Uyirodu Uyiraga	Anjali's friend	
1999	Padayappa	Suryaprakash's wife	
1999	Suyamvaram	Pallavan's sister	
1999	Sangamam	Selvam's sister	
1999	Jodi	Uma	
1999	Kannupada Poguthaiya	The bride	
1999	Sethu	Abitha's sister	
2000	Thenali	Raj TV reporter	
2000	Kannaal Pesavaa	Sandhya	
2001	Samudhiram		
2001	Poovellam Un Vasam	Chinna's sister	
2002	Kamarasu		
2002	Run		
2002	Sundhara Travels	TV reporter	
2002	Arputham	Vasanthi	
2002	Samasthanam	Sudha	
2002	Villain		
2003	Military	Nandhini	
2003	Aethirree	Priya's friend	
2003	Indru Mudhal	Geetha's friend	
2003	Alai	Meera's friend	
2003	Anjaneya		
2003	Thirumalai	Uma	
2003	Anbe Un Vasam		
2003	Joot	Eashwaran's sister-in-law	
2003	Sindhamal Sitharamal		
2004	Gajendra		
2006	Iyappa Saamy		
2006	Thalaimagan	Abhirami	
2006	Aavani Thingal	Rasathi	
2007	Manikanda	Manikanda's sister	
2007	Mudhal Kanave	Lavanya	
2009	Sindhanai Sei	Madhu	
2009	Saa Boo Thiri	Shanthi	
2010	Thunichal	Sakthi's elder sister	
2010	Pen Singam	Sivakami	
2010	Naane Ennul Illai	Vaani	
2010	Anandhapurathu Veedu	Raadhika	
2011	Uchithanai Muharnthaal	Mrs. Charles Antony	
2013	Machinichi		
2013	Thirumathi Thamizh		
2013	Naankam Thamizhan		
2014	Naan Thaan Bala	Poochi's wife	
2023	Bakasuran		

=== Other language films ===
Year	Film	Role	Language	Notes
1997	Aaramthampuran	Dancer	Malayalam	
1998	Hello Yama		Kannada	
2001	Aram Indriyam		Malayalam	
2002	Jagathy Jagadeesh in Town	Rasika	Malayalam	
2002	Seshu	Abithu's sister	Telugu	

== TV Series ==
- Aruvi (2021 - 2024)
- Suriyaputhiri (2012-2014)
- Romapuri Pandian
- Arasi (2008) as Yamuna Rani
- veppilai kaari
- Kathu Karuppu (2005)
- Nalla Neram
- Nee yenge yen Anbe
