= Aalambana =

Upcoming Indian film

- Poster with previous release date
- Directed by: Pari K Vijay
- Written by: Pari K Vijay
- Produced by: Kotapadi J Rajesh
- Starring: Vaibhav; Parvati Nair
- Cinematography: Vinoth Rathinasamy
- Edited by: San Lokesh
- Music by: Hiphop Tamizha
- Production companies: KJR Studios; Koustubh Entertainment
- Country: India
- Language: Tamil

Aalambana (transl. Ālambana) is an unreleased Indian Tamil-language fantasy comedy film directed by debutant Pari K Vijay and produced by Kotapadi J. Rajesh under the banner KJR Studios and co-produced by Koustubh Entertainment. The film stars Vaibhav and Parvati Nair with a supporting cast including Munishkanth, Yogi Babu, Anandaraj, Kabir Duhan Singh, Kaali Venkat and Robo Shankar. The film's music is composed by Hiphop Tamizha, with cinematography handled by Vinoth Rathinasamy and editing done by San Lokesh. The film began production in December 2019 and ended in January 2021. The film remains unreleased due to legal and financial issues.

== Cast ==
- Vaibhav as Anbu
- Parvati Nair
- Anandaraj
- Munishkanth as the genie
- Kaali Venkat
- Yogi Babu
- Robo Shankar
- Dindigul I. Leoni
- Pandiarajan
- Murali Sharma
- Kabir Duhan Singh
- Praveena
- Nakkalites Dhanam

== Production ==
In November 2019, Vaibhav was cast to play the lead role in the film produced by KJR Studios and directed by newcomer Pari K Vijay, who had earlier worked as an assistant in films like Mundasupatti (2014) and Indru Netru Naalai (2015). Munishkanth was chosen to play the role of a genie, and the film was said to be in the fantasy comedy genre. Parvati Nair was cast as the female lead opposite to Vaibhav. Principal photography began with a pooja ceremony on 14 December 2019 in MGR Film City. The film was shot in Mysore Palace, Chennai and Pondicherry, and the shooting was completed in January 2021. It was said to be the costliest film in Vaibhav's career.

== Soundtrack ==
The soundtrack and score is composed by Hiphop Tamizha and the album featured two songs. The audio rights were acquired by Sony Music India.

Track listing
No.	Title	Lyrics	Singer(s)	Length
1.	"Eppa Paarthaalum"	Pa. Vijay	Armaan Malik	3:30
2.	"Opening Song Ithu"	Kabilan Vairamuthu	Ajay Krishna	4:05
Total length:				7:35

== Release ==
Aalambana was initially scheduled for a theatrical release on 15 December 2023; however, on 12 December, TSR Studios filed a case against 24AM Studios and KJR Studios for borrowing ₹10 crore and only paying back ₹3 crore. This resulted in the film receiving a four-week ban from release. According to an April 2024 article by Webdunia, the producer was in debt of at least ₹40 crore (US$4.2 million). In February 2025, the producers announced a release date of 7 March 2025, but this did not pan out.
