= Mutham =

- DVD cover
- Directed by: S. A. Chandrasekaran
- Written by: Screenplay & Dialogues: S. A. Chandrasekaran
- Produced by: M. Arul Moorthy
- Starring: Arunkumar; Sathyan; Nagendra Prasad; Ajayan; Charulatha; Nanditha Jennifer; Anjali
- Cinematography: R. Selva
- Edited by: L. Justin Roy
- Music by: Bharani
- Production company: Digital Magic Productions
- Release date: 6 December 2002
- Running time: 130 minutes
- Country: India
- Language: Tamil

Mutham (transl. Kiss) is a 2002 Indian Tamil-language slasher film directed by S. A. Chandrasekaran. The film stars Arun Vijay (known at the time as Arunkumar), Sathyan, Nagendra Prasad, Ajayan, Charulatha, Nanditha Jennifer and Anjali. The film, produced by M. Arul Moorthy, was released on 6 December 2002.

== Plot ==
Joseph (Ajayan) and Sudha (Anjali) get married against their parents' wishes and they elope with their friends' help. Sudha's father (Vincent Roy), a politician, wants to kill Sudha and her friends. They arrive at a beach resort where they meet an old man (Thalaivasal Vijay) who warns them about the dangers at the resort. He tells them that the place is haunted and murders can take place. The friends arrange for the couple's honeymoon, ignoring his pleadings to vacate the place. However, in the forest, all the friends get murdered one by one. It turns out that the old man was the one who committed these killings as he explains his flashback of his granddaughter getting killed in the name of sacrifice by unscrupulous businessmen for the sake of buying the forest where the resort has been built and as for that, he kills each and every person who visits this resort. In the end, the old man gets stabbed and Arun and his lover escape from the place being worried about the situation.

== Cast ==
- Arunkumar as Bharath
- Sathyan as Pazhani
- Nagendra Prasad as Anand
- Ajayan as Joseph (Joe)
- Charulatha as Bindu
- Nanditha Jennifer as Aarthi
- Anjali as Sudha
- Thalaivasal Vijay as Killer
- Madhan Bob as Unnikrishnan
- M. S. Bhaskar as Maya
- Vincent Roy as Sudha's father
- Nithya Ravindran as Sudha's mother
- Baby Divya
- Alphonsa in a special appearance

== Production ==
The film was developed under the title Muthamidalaama (transl. May I kiss?) and was touted as India's first digital film made for theatres. The film was shot for fifty days in forests across Tirupati, Hogenakkal Falls, Yelagiri hills and Alappuzha.

== Soundtrack ==
The soundtrack was composed by Bharani.

Song	Singer(s)	Lyrics	Duration
"La La La"	Tippu, Harini	Snehan	4:59
"Laiko Laiko"	Malgudi Subha	Thamarai	4:56
"Orampo Orampo"	Harish Raghavendra, K. S. Chithra	Snehan	4:54
"Oru Murai Nee Yennai"	P. Unni Krishnan, S. A. Chandrasekhar	Newton	3:31
"Saturday Sunday"	Tippu	Pa. Vijay	5:05
"Tigirtana"	Harish Raghavendra, Swarnalatha	Newton	5:17

== Critical reception ==
A critic from Sify wrote that "S.A.Chandrasekhar’s blend of tacky horror mixed with Alphonsa’s dance number in the jungle is all intolerable". Tulika from Rediff.com wrote that "As a film, Mutham is eminently forgettable. But at the technological level, it could turn out to be the trailblazer that changes the way films are shot in India". Malini Mannath of Chennai Online wrote that "But while they've [Hindi filmmakers] borrowed the main plot, they've worked on the script and added their own interesting touches. But Chandrasekhar has not been able to do that, with both his inspirations turning out to be just bad copies". Cinesouth wrote, "Tamil's first digital experimentation didn't have to turn out to be so pathetic". Yahoo wrote "Director S A Chandrasekar (father of actor Vijay) seems to think that a few girls in 'trendy' (read skimpy) clothes will cover the huge lapses in content. But alas! 'Mutham' ends up as a film that does not do justice to either the 'love' or the 'suspense' genre!".
