= Maanja Velu =

- Theatrical release poster
- Directed by: A. Venkatesh
- Written by: Prabakar (dialogues)
- Story by: Sriwass
- Based on: Lakshyam (Telugu)(2007) by Sriwass
- Produced by: Mrs. Susil Mohan; M. Hemanth
- Starring: Arun Vijay; Karthik; Prabhu; Dhansika
- Cinematography: Venkatesh Anguraj
- Edited by: V. T. Vijayan
- Music by: Mani Sharma
- Production company: Feather Touch Entertainments
- Release date: 21 May 2010
- Country: India
- Language: Tamil

Maanja Velu is a 2010 Indian Tamil-language masala film directed by A. Venkatesh. It stars Arun Vijay, Karthik, Prabhu and Dhansika, with Vijayakumar and Riyaz Khan playing supporting roles and Santhanam and Ganja Karuppu providing comical relief.

It is a remake of the 2007 Telugu film Lakshyam. The film became a hit at the box office similar to Venkatesh's 2009 masala film Malai Malai.

== Plot ==
The film starts with Anjali escaping on a motorcycle from her enforced engagement with the assistance of the groom; however, DIG Easwarapandian sees her from his police car. Meanwhile, a valiant Velu absconds from the police prison and beats a group of policemen. Easwarapandian arrives at the warehouse. Velu jumps over his car and then shoots it, killing him. He drives off on Anjali's motorcycle.

Past: Six months ago, ACP Bose was a sincere and happily married police officer. He lives with his parents, wife, and younger brother, Velu. Velu is a college student who manages the college canteen. He falls in love with his classmate, Anjali. Velu always loves his family and his brother. Enter Umapathi, the villain who is notorious for land deals. On a field trip with her friends, Anjali comes across Bose. She gets friendly with his daughter Pinky, who tells her that she will get introduced to her uncle Velu and that they will be a good pair. It turns out that Velu studies at Anjali's college, and after comedic incidents, they get to know one another and get close.

Bose investigates the case of Umapathi, whom no one has been able to touch. He is even involved with a land deal involving crores of money, which is illegal, and others, including the DIG. When trying to arrest Umapathi for a witness' death, the minister calls the DIG to let Umapathi go. So Bose kills goons linked to Umapathi's crime syndicate. The chairman of the chit fund, who lent ₹1,000,000,000 (US$21.5 million) for the deal, demands the money back as the agreement has not worked. Umapathi requests the help of Dinesh, Velu's friend and Umapathi's henchman. Dinesh technically assassinates the chairman by electrocuting him, and Bose uncovers his death. Dinesh lusts for Anjali. Velu saves Anjali after she gets kidnapped. He beats up Umapathi's goons and Umapathi; he threatens and beats up Umapathi.

Umapathi gets angry that Velu beat him up. Dinesh plans to kill Velu. So on a trip to Vellore for Anjali's cousin's wedding, Umapathi's goons attack Velu and Anjali; however, Velu beats up his goons. Velu asks Dinesh to get away with Anjali, unaware of Dinesh's diabolic shade. Dinesh reveals to Anjali how he is mad at her and that he was the one who organised the goons to kill Velu. There are also comedic incidents between Ezhumalai, Manickam (Velu's friend), and Bhooshan. The chit-fund customers revolt and damage the bank; Bose arrives at the location, arrests the chit-fund manager, and takes him away. Somehow, Umapathi discovers the manager's whereabouts. He reaches there with his men and the DIG. Bose beats up his goons, DIG and Umapathi. Dinesh stabs Bose with a knife, and he takes Dinesh's chain. The DIG and Umapathi also stabbed him with knives, nearly killing Bose. Umapathi kills the manager and frames Bose for the manager's murder. The DIG lies to the entire media and the people and makes them think Bose has swindled off all the people's money, and they organise protests. The doctor sees Bose leaving the hospital and informs Velu. Umapathi asks his men to dump the body. Velu ultimately rescues Bose from a burning bus. Bose dies in Velu's arms and sees the Srirangam gopuram, fulfilling his wish. Velu and his friends carry out his funeral rites and shave his head and beard. Velu receives a phone call that Bose's wife (Velu's sister-in-law) has given birth to a baby boy. His family is upset about Bose's disappearance, and Velu hides Bose's death.

Velu decides to take revenge on the people who killed his brother. First, he discovers Dinesh's locket in his pocket, which Bose left in his pocket before dying. He impales and kills Dinesh after discovering his involvement in Bose's death. Then he kills the DIG after luring him.

Present: Umapathi also kidnaps Velu's entire family after seeing Velu saving Bose in the media recording. Velu goes to an old temple, where he kills Umapathi. He burst into tears and revealed that Bose was dead, and he rescued his family under the supervision of the new DIG, Gautham Ganesh, who supported him wholeheartedly.

== Cast ==
- Arun Vijay as Shankarvel “Velu”
- Karthik as ACP Subash Chandra Bose aka ACP Bose, Velu's brother
- Prabhu as DIG Gautham Ganesh IPS
- Dhansika as Anjali, Velu's love interest
- Santhanam as Manickam, Velu's friend
- Chandrashekar as Umapathi
- Hemanth as Dinesh, Velu's friend later killed by Velu after he betrayed Bose
- Riyaz Khan as DGP Easwarapandian
- Ilavarasu as Sivagnanam, a police officer
- Ganja Karuppu as Bhooshan
- Vijayakumar as Velu's father
- Meera Krishnan as Velu's mother
- Anu Haasan as Bose's wife
- Nizhalgal Ravi as Anjali's father
- Shakeela as Mathangi, Manikkam and Bhooshan's mother
- Lollu Sabha Manohar as Ezhumalai, Manikkam and Bhooshan's father
- R. S. Shivaji as Avatar mama
- Thyagu as Anjali's father's friend
- Singamuthu as Guruji
- Durai Ramesh as land owner, later killed by Umapathi
- O. A. K. Sundar as bank manager
- Kovai Krishnan as chairman
- Pandi as Velu's Friend
- Chaams
- Pandu
- Cool Suresh as lover boy
- Benjamin
- Citizen Mani
- Maran as Snake Shankar
- Shariq Hassan as One of the protestor (Uncredited)

== Production ==
In early September 2009, the title was revealed to be Maanja Velu. Karthik made his comeback through this film, playing Arun's elder brother. Arun tonsured his head to give a new look and also hanged upside down for a scene.

== Controversy ==
Before the release, Dr. Kalidoss has stated that he had been in the film industry for the past 15 years and that he completed a film titled ‘Thunichal’ with Arun Vijay in the lead in the year 2008. He also stated that though the Censor Board had cleared the film, Arun Vijay had ‘purposely’ delayed the release of the film by not completing his portion of the ‘dubbing’ work. As he had spent Rs.2 crores till date, the producer told Vijay that he couldn't continue to shoot the film. Meanwhile, he was asked by the actor to release Thunichal after his ‘Malai Malai’ released. Due to his non-cooperation, instead of releasing ‘Thunichal’ in 160 theatres, I could release the film only in 16 theatres on 1 January this year, said Kalidoss. Due to this, I incurred a loss of Rs.1.5 crores, he added. "Due to the mental harassment I had to endure because of Arun Vijay, I couldn’t continue my profession as a doctor for the past 4 years. Vijay has to pay me Rs.1.5 crores and till he does so, the release of his ‘Maanja Velu’ should be stayed till the 19th of this month," he had stated in the petition Dr. Mohan, producer of ‘Maanja Velu’ and father-in-law of Arun Vijay, had filed a counter petition with the Court praying for vacation of the stay on the grounds that he, as a producer, had nothing to do with Dr. Kalidoss’ case and requested that as such, his film should be allowed to release on the stipulated date. Advocate G. Murugesh Kumar, who appeared on behalf of Dr. Mohan in the court of Mr. Justice T. S. Sivagnanam, managed to putforth his point of view strongly before the Judge and said that Dr. Kalidoss had ‘wrongly informed’ the Court in the matter. As soon as the Judge announced that he'd be giving the verdict based on the ‘actual nature’ of the case, Dr. Kalidoss is said to have ‘withdrawn’ his petition from the Court. Following this, the Judge dismissed the petition and said that the film could release on 21 May as per its original schedule.

== Music ==
The soundtrack is composed by Mani Sharma and he reused "Eppadi Thaan Muraichu" and "Maanja Maanja" from "Niluvave" and "Sukku Sukku" from Lakshyam, respectively. "Ooril Ulla Uyirghalelaam" was reused from "Aaduvari Matalaku" from Kushi. Karthik Srinivasan of Milliblog said, "getting 3 decent tracks in a masala potboiler soundtrack is a huge win indeed".

Track listing
No.	Title	Lyrics	Performer(s)	Length
1.	"Munneru Munneru"	Vaali	Ranjith, Naveen
2.	"Eppadi Thaan Muraichu"	Vaali	Rahul Nambiar
3.	"Maanja Maanja"	Vaali	Tippu, Sujatha
4.	"Oh My Dear"	Viveka	Ranjith, Saindhavi
5.	"Ooril Ulla Uyirghalelaam"	Vaali	Karthik
6.	"Maanja Maanja" (Retro Remix)	Vaali	Mukesh Mohamed, Priya Subramaniam

== Release ==
The film was released on 21 May 2010 alongside Magane En Marumagane, Kanagavel Kaaka, Kutti Pisasu, Kola Kolaya Mundhirika and Kutrapirivu.

== Reception ==
=== Box office ===
The film has seen an above average opening with total collections running up to Rs.18 lakhs and weekend collections at Rs.3,38,177 in second week. After that, weekend saw Rs. 4,22,307 drawn in its favor with Rs. 26 lakhs over the last weeks. Rs. 1,76,967 was made by the film this weekend with Rs.32 lakhs spanning over 3 weeks.

=== Critical response ===
Sify said, "On the whole director Venkatesh has dished out an average run of the mill mass masala cocktail which is quite entertaining in the first half but fizzles out in the second half with a predictable long drawn out climax". The Times of India said, "The one thing that strikes you about Maanja Velu is what a talent house Tamil cinema has been. As you watch the parade of the seniors like Karthik, Prabhu, Vijaykumar and Vagai Chandrasekhar you feel glad that they came up with good, great, moving or simply lovable performances in the past. It does a lot to ease the heart burn caused by the so-called earthy cinema that we have been treated to for months and months now. Where you saw plenty of victims of circumstances on display, but so very lacking in angst that you came away from the movie without any emotional connect". Chennaionline said, "Maanja Velu has all the ingredients of a masala flick but the problem is that it has no novelty or neatness to impress us".
