= Aathi =

2006 film directed by Ramana

- Theatrical release poster
- Directed by: Ramana
- Written by: Ramana
- Story by: Surender Reddy
- Based on: Athanokkade (Telugu)
- Produced by: S. A. Chandrasekhar; Shoba Chandrasekhar
- Starring: Vijay; Trisha; Prakash Raj; Sai Kumar; Nassar
- Cinematography: Soundarrajan
- Edited by: Suresh Urs
- Music by: Vidyasagar
- Production company: V. V. Creations
- Release date: 15 January 2006
- Running time: 167 minutes
- Country: India
- Language: Tamil

Aathi is a 2006 Indian Tamil-language action film, directed by Ramana and produced by S. A. Chandrasekhar. Starring Vijay and Trisha in the lead roles, it is the Tamil remake of the 2005 Telugu movie Athanokkade.

Aathi released on 15 January 2006. It received mixed reviews and was an average grosser.

== Plot ==
The film starts with Anjali sitting on a bench in Rameswaram feeding a white pigeon by a calm ocean. A retired police officer Shankar comes and sits on the bench by her side, and they exchange pleasantries. Suddenly, she whips out a knife and kills him with the help of her maternal uncle Ramachandran, while saying that she has been waiting for this moment for many years. She then returns to Chennai with Ramachandran to attend college.

After that, the scene shifts to Aathi, who lives in New Delhi with his family, consisting of his parents Mani and Lakshmi, who love him and his sister. He attends a course at a college in Chennai against his parents' wishes. Unable to be separated from Aathi, his family comes to Chennai with him. It is revealed that Anjali is studying in the same college as Aathi, and she has an agenda to seek revenge on her family's killers and Ramachandran assists her. Meanwhile, RDX, a local gangster, enters and is shown to have a dispute with Pattabhi. To exact their revenge, Ramachandran attempts to kill Sadha, one of RDX's henchmen but fails to do so since Aathi kills Sadha with a gun he was armed with. At first naturally, RDX assumes the killer can be none other than Pattabhi, so he kills him. However, Aathi arrives on the scene with help from Bullet, his college classmate who is a comical rowdy. Aathi threatens RDX saying that he was the one who killed Sadha and that he will also kill RDX's another henchman Abdullah. Abdullah gets angry and goes to kill Aathi but fails and Aathi beheads Abdullah, while his family witnesses this act with horror. Soon, it is revealed that Aathi is their adopted son and he is on a personal mission to eliminate the people behind the murder of his biological family. Aathi reveals his flashback to them.

Aathi's biological father was an honest cop who arrested one of RDX's henchmen. It is revealed that Anjali and Aathi are from the same family as Aathi's father is Anjali's maternal uncle. RDX visits Aathi's house and asks his grandfather to let his henchmen go. When Aathi's grandfather refuses, RDX threatens them, only to find knives being held at him by Aathi and his cousins. Aathi's father arrives and arrests RDX. Infuriated, he visits with his brother Robert, Abdullah, Sadha, Shankar and some of their henchmen. Together, they murder the whole extended family. Only Anjali, Ramachandran and Aathi survived the attack that annihilated their family. After the house is blown up by RDX, Aathi is taken in by a couple who later become his adopted parents.

On finding out his past, Aathi's adoptive parents request him to come back to New Delhi, but he refuses. He then takes them to the railway station but is nearly ambushed by RDX's men. He defeats them in a fight and meets RDX, warning him to bring Robert from Dubai, whom he promises to kill in front of Robert. Soon, Robert arrives and in revenge, he kills Ramachandran, while challenging Aathi to meet him at RDX's place. Aathi came after finding out that RDX kidnapped Anjali and held her hostage by his henchmen in the library of their college, which happens to be the old house that Aathi, Anjali and their family lived in. Though injured, Aathi escapes after killing Robert with his gun. RDX's men hold Anjali hostage, but Bullet and the other students in the college save her. After a prolonged fight between them, Aathi kills RDX and is shown to be leaving and reuniting with Anjali, the only one left in his family.

== Cast ==
- Vijay as Aathikesavan (Aathi)
- Trisha as Anjali Krishnankutty
- Prakash Raj as ACP Ramachandran, Aathi’s father
- Sai Kumar as RDX
- Nassar as Anjali’s maternal uncle
- Vivek as Bullet
- Subbaraju as Robert
- Adithya as Abdullah
- Karate Raja as Sadha
- Manivannan as Mani, Aathi's adopted father
- Seetha as Lakshmi, Aathi's adopted mother
- Livingston as Anjali's father
- Amritha as Aathi's mother
- Vijayakumar as Aathi's grandfather
- Sneha Nambiar as Anjali's mother
- Malavika Avinash as Anjali’s maternal aunt
- Rajan P. Dev as Pattabhi
- Santhana Bharathi as Minister
- Devan as Shankar, corrupt police officer who supports RDX and his men
- Madhan Bob as Taxi Driver
- Dhamu as Auto Driver
- Raj Kapoor as Corrupt Minister who supports RDX and his men
- Five Star Krishna as Suicide Victim
- Sweatha Bharathi as Aathi's sister
- Sampath Ram
- Nandha Saravanan as Pattabhi's Henchman

== Production ==
=== Development ===
Chandrasekhar bought the remake rights of Telugu film Athanokkade (2005) to make it in Tamil with his son Vijay. The film was produced by him under Suriyan Arts. He was credited as S. A. Chandrasekhara in title credits. Ramana, who earlier worked with Vijay in Thirumalai (2003) was selected to direct this film. Trisha was chosen to be the lead actress pairing with Vijay for third time after Ghilli (2004) and Thirupaachi (2005). Saikumar was chosen to portray the antagonist while Prakash Raj, Vivek, Nassar, Seetha and Manivannan were selected to portray supporting roles.

=== Filming ===
The song picturisation with a set costing ₹40 lakh was shot with around 50 dancers. The scenes with Trisha were the first to be filmed during the film's launch. The sets of police station, palatial house and hospital were built at Kushal Das gardens. The song "Durra durranu" was shot at Araku Valley. The climax was shot at Hyderabad. Another song was shot at Switzerland. Most of the filming was held at Chennai, Gingee, Vishakapatnam and Hyderabad.

== Music ==
Aadhi

Soundtrack album by Vidyasagar
- Released: 2006
- Genre: Soundtrack
- Label: Five Star Audio
- Producer: Vidyasagar

Vidyasagar chronology
Paramasivan (2006)	Aadhi (2006)	Pasa Kiligal (2006)

The film has five songs composed by Vidyasagar. The audio was launched at Green Park Hotel on 22 December 2005.

Song title	Singers	Lyrics
"Olli Olli Iduppe"	Karthik, Anuradha Sriram	P. Vijay
"Ennai Konja Konja"	Hariharan, Sujatha Mohan	Yugabharathi
"Athi Athikka"	S. P. Balasubrahmanyam, Sadhana Sargam	P. Vijay
"Yea Duraa"	Saindhavi, Tippu	P. Vijay
"Lealakku Lealakku"	KK, Sujatha Mohan	P. Vijay

The film includes two more songs not included in the audio soundtrack:

- "Varran Varran" sung by Tippu
- "Iruvar Vazhvum" sung by Karthik & Kalyani Nair

== Release ==
The film released on 15 January 2006. The satellite rights of the film were sold to Kalaignar TV for ₹11 crore. Theatrical rights for Tamil Nadu were sold for ₹17 crore. The film didn't perform as well as expected, which Sify.com attributed to the film not being released on Pongal Day. The film released alongside Silambarasan's Saravana and Ajith Kumar's Paramasivan.

Despite being remade from Telugu, Aathi was dubbed and released in Telugu as Nenera Aadhi. The film was dubbed in Hindi as Aadhi Narayan by Eagle Movies in YouTube.

== Reception ==
Ananda Vikatan rated the film 38 out of 100. Indiaglitz wrote "Director Ramana has faithfully stuck to the Telugu original and come up with a gritty entertainer". Chennai Online wrote "It's yet another fight-dance-romance formula from Vijay, this one being the remake of the Telugu hit 'Athanokkade'. But unlike his earlier films, which were either enjoyable or at least tolerable, this one tries one's patience as one goes through the tiring, monotonous routine of watching the angst-ridden hero fight against yet another new set of enemies and impossible odds". Lajjavathi of Kalki wrote despite not having an intro song it was still an routine Vijay film and felt many characters spoke too slowly and Saikumar was referred as "almost Vijay's PRO" for praising him throughout the film and found Prakash Raj and Vivek to be criminally underused.
