= Thirumalai =

2003 film by Ramana

- Theatrical release poster
- Directed by: Ramana
- Written by: Ramana
- Produced by: K. Balachander; Pushpa Kandaswamy
- Starring: Vijay; Jyothika
- Cinematography: R. Rathnavelu
- Edited by: Suresh Urs
- Music by: Vidyasagar
- Production company: Kavithalayaa Productions
- Distributed by: Kavithalayaa Productions
- Release date: 24 October 2003
- Running time: 167 minutes
- Country: India
- Language: Tamil

Thirumalai is a 2003 Indian (Tamil-language romantic action film written and directed by Ramana (in his directorial debut) and produced by Kavithalayaa Productions. The film stars Vijay and Jyothika, alongside Manoj K. Jayan, Avinash Yelandur, Vivek, Raghuvaran, Kausalya and Karunas. The music was composed by Vidyasagar, while cinematography and editing were handled by R. Rathnavelu and Suresh Urs.

The film was released on 24 October 2003, coinciding with Diwali. Thirumalai became a box-office success and completed more than 100 days in theatres. It became a turning point in Vijay's career, marking his transformation into an action hero from a romantic once. The film was remade in Telugu as Gowri (2004) and in Bangaldeshi as Kotha Dao Sathi Hobe (2007).

== Plot ==
Thirumalai, a rough-looking kind-hearted mechanic, lives a peaceful life in Chennai with his friends and also has close relations with his neighbours – Selvam and Nagalakshmi, a couple. Thirumalai considers Nagalakshmi as his sister. Thirumalai develops feelings for Shwetha after meeting her on New Year's Day. At first, Shwetha doesn't want to associate with Thirumalai and swears to her father Ashok, the owner of six TV channels, that she doesn't even know about him. Thirumalai tries out many ways to win Shwetha's heart.

One day, one of Thirumalai's friends elopes with his lover from her wedding. Thirumalai went with them to the wedding venue and becomes successful in winning the heart of the girl's father and her fiancé, letting the girl marry Thirumalai's friend. Shwetha reciprocates his feelings after understanding his good nature. However, Ashok gets enraged with their relationship due to status issues and assigns Arasu, a gangster, to finish Thirumalai.

Arasu kidnaps Thirumalai's friends and neighbors and threatens him. Later, Arasu releases them, where he understands Thirumalai's kind-heartedness and decides to reform himself, which is not accepted by his assistant Dass. Dass turns Arasu's men against him to finish Arasu and Thirumalai. Thirumalai eventually fixes the issue and reunites with Shwetha, making Ashok realizing his mistakes.

== Cast ==
- Vijay as Thirumalai
- Jyothika as Swetha
- Manoj K. Jayan as Arasu
- Avinash as Ashok, Swetha's father
- Vivek as Palanisamy
- Raghuvaran as Selvam (Artistu), Thirumalai's neighbour
- Kausalya as Nagalakshmi, Selvam's wife
- Karunas as Gopi
- Five Star Krishna as Krishna
- T. P. Gajendran as Gopal, Gopi's father
- Shanthi Williams as Thirumalai's friend's mother
- Ajay Rathnam as Traffic Police Officer
- Lavanya as Uma
- Bonda Mani as Fake Astrologer
- Anju Mahendran as Thirumalai's friend
- Pasi Sathya as Paravatham, Palani's grandmother
- Cell Murugan as a Telugu devotee from Tirumala
- Annadurai Kannadasan as S. Raja (Company Owner)
- Kalairani as Gopi's mother
- Nizhalgal Ravi as Dass, Arasu's assistant
- Vijay Krishnaraj as Rathnavel, Uma's father
- Sakthi Kumar
- Kovai Senthil as Selvam's neighbour
- Master Udayaraj as Suma, Thirumalai's friend
- R. Sundaramoorthy as Arasu's victim
- Nellai Siva as Thirumalai's friend
- Kovai Babu in a special appearance
- Raghava Lawrence in a special appearance in the song "Thaamthakka Dheemthakka"
- Kiran Rathod as Jakkamma in a special appearance in the song "Vaadiyamma Jakkamma"
- Ashok Raja in a special appearance in the song "Vaadiyamma Jakkamma"

== Production ==
The filming began, when Vijay was simultaneously shooting for his previous films like Vaseegara and Pudhiya Geethai. Directing the film was debutant Ramana who had apprenticed with director R. K. Selvamani. Vijay also sported a new look, which he maintained and varied for his subsequent films until Sivakasi. It was actually director Ramana, who suggested Vijay that he maintain a new look in the film, with his mustache trimmed and growing a beard. Vijay was initially hesitant to do so, but upon seeing the screen test, he was impressed with his new getup. Namrata Shirodkar was chosen initially to play the female lead, but the director was not satisfied with her onscreen presence and she was replaced by Jyothika. This was her second film with Vijay after Kushi (2000).

Since the film's protagonist portrays a mechanic residing in Pudhupettai area, a set resembling Pudhupettai with a mechanic shop in it was erected at Mohan Studios at a cost of about ₹50 lakh within 40 days. Designed by art director Kathir, the film shooting took place there for 30 days and shooting occurred in Chennai, Nellore and Vishakhapatnam, while the songs were filmed overseas.

== Music ==
Thirumalai

Soundtrack album by Vidyasagar
- Released: 22 June 2003
- Recorded: 2002–2003
- Genre: Feature film soundtrack
- Labels: New Music; Hit Musics; Classic Audio; Ayngaran Music
- Producer: Vidyasagar

Vidyasagar chronology
Dhool (2002)	Thirumalai (2003)	Iyarkai (2003)

The music was composed by Vidyasagar. The audio's album consisting of five songs, was released on 22 June 2003, which marked Vijay's 29th birthday. It was the third collaboration of Vijay and Vidyasagar, preceded by Coimbatore Maapillai and Nilaave Vaa. The audio was also well received among the audience and marked a series of collaborations between Vijay and Vidyasagar with Ghilli, Madhurey, Aathi, Kuruvi and Kaavalan.

Song	Singers	Lyrics	Picturization
"Thaamthakka Dheemthakka"	Tippu, Karthik	Na. Muthukumar	Vijay, Raghavendra Lawrence
"Vaadiyamma Jakkamma"	Udit Narayan	Kabilan	Vijay, Kiran Rathod
"Neeyaa Pesiyadhu"	Shankar Mahadevan	Yugabharathi	Vijay, Jyothika
"Azhagooril Poothavale"	S. P. Balasubrahmanyam, Sujatha Mohan	Arivumathi	Vijay, Jyothika
"Dhimsu Katta"	Tippu, Srilekha Parthasarathy	Pa. Vijay	Vijay, Jyothika

== Release ==
The film was released on 24 October 2003 worldwide, on the occasion of Diwali, and was commercially successful. The film released alongside Pithamagan and Anjaneya.

== Critical reception ==
Ananda Vikatan rated the film 39 out of 100. Chennai Online wrote, "There's nothing fresh here that we haven't seen in an earlier Vijay film. The Vijay-Jyotika pair, after their successful combination in Kushi, was expected to re-create the same magic on screen. But it doesn't happen".
