= Indru Mudhal =

- VCD cover
- Directed by: M. A. Murugesh
- Produced by: Santhi Murali; Rani Pandian; Chithra Manoharan
- Starring: Mithun; Daisy; Nanditha
- Cinematography: M. M. Rangasamy
- Edited by: K. Sankar
- Music by: Deva
- Production company: Kollywood Kreations
- Release date: 1 May 2003
- Country: India
- Language: Tamil

Indru Mudhal (transl. From Today) is a 2003 Indian Tamil-language romantic drama film written and directed by M. A. Murugesh, in his debut. The film stars Mithun, Daisy and Nanditha, while Ramesh Khanna, Nagesh, Ravichandran, Sarath Babu and K. S. Ravikumar appear in supporting roles. It was released on 1 May 2003, and did not perform well at the box office.

== Plot ==
Balamurali Krishna and Geethanjali, students at the navy cadet college, are constantly at each other's throats. However, they soon realise that they are long lost childhood friends.

== Cast ==
- Mithun as Balamurali Krishna
- Daisy as Geethanjali
- Nanditha as Jenny
- Ramesh Khanna as Krishna's friend
- Nagesh as Krishna's grandfather
- Ravichandran as Krishna's father
- Sarath Babu as Geetha's father
- Kaushik
- Yuvarani as Chakra, Geetha's mother
- Lavanya as Geetha's friend and Shankar's lover
- Meera Krishnan as Krishna's mother
- Bayilvan Ranganathan as ACP
- Manobala as Doctor
- Crane Manohar
- Suruli Manohar as Roadside shop owner
- Kottai Perumal as Restaurant customer
- Master Gowtham as young Krishna
- Master Bharath as Geetha's rival in childhood
- Baby Akshaya as young Geetha
- Kollywood Murali in a special appearance
- K. S. Ravikumar as Dr. K. S. Ravikumar

== Production ==
The film marked the directorial debut of M. A. Murugesh, who had previously worked as an apprentice under K. S. Ravikumar. The shoot of the film was held at locations including the VGP Golden Beach resort in Chennai, as well as Kodaikanal and Gujarat, where they shot scenes depicting the 2001 Gujarat earthquake. Further scenes were shot depicting a cycle race featuring 200 young people, while the climax was filmed on a large ship, the N. N. Cauveri.

== Soundtrack ==
The soundtrack was composed by Deva, with lyrics written by Pa. Vijay.

Song	Singers	Length
Yaar Kandatho	Krishnaraj, Sujatha	05:30
Eureka Eureka	Pop Shalini	04:32
Vijaya Vil Vijaya	Anuradha Sriram	04:52
Vanavillai Unnai	Karthik, Sujatha	05:06
Champa Gujarathi	S. P. Balasubrahmanyam, Pop Shalini	04:56

== Critical reception ==
Malini Mannath of Chennai Online wrote, "The debutant director takes the narration from the hill-station, to the earthquake-hit Bhuj, and back to the hill-station, to add some drama and generate interest in his sweet hearts-separeated-at-childhood story. All to no avail". Visual Dasan of Kalki wrote that though the director is inspired from Kadhal Kottai, he has succeeded in maintaining the same tempo from that film while praising the humour of Ravikumar and Ramesh Khanna, Deva's music and Rengasamy's cinematography but panned Nanditha's character and concluded saying although the story is old, the film survives because the visuals are fresh.
