= Tirlok Malik =

Indian-American film maker

- Born: New Delhi, India
- Occupations: Film maker, actor and producer

Tirlok Malik (born in New Delhi) is an Indian-American film maker, actor and producer based in New York. He has been nominated in Emmy Awards. He is also an entrepreneur, ayurveda restaurateur and happy life yoga speaker.

== Early life ==
Malik was born and brought in New Delhi. He shifted to New York in his early 20s to expand his father's export business.

== Biography ==
Malik started his career as a model for print and television before shifting to theatre. He has more than 300 performance in the Broadway. Later he became a producer and finally an actor, writer and director.

In 2007, He was nominated in Emmy Awards for producing the television series "Namaste: I love making films in New York".

He is CEO of Apple Productions and founder of Nritvfilmclub.

Malik has produced several films under the banner of Apple production since 1990 starting with Lonely in America. The film was shown in 74 countries and as well as on HBO and participated in 37 film festivals, winning multiple Awards. He continues to make films about Indian American experiences in America. He released a new short film 'To New India with Love' on the occasion of India's 75th Independence Day.

Malik's work as an actor and a filmmaker has been acclaimed globally. He also received the Pride of India Gold Medal for his work as a filmmaker from the Indian Ambassador of the USA. In August 2007, Tirlok Malik was presented with the New York Citizens Award from the New York Mayor's Office. In 2014, Manhattan Borough President Gale Brewer presented him a citation for his work as a filmmaker and a restaurateur and declared 1 November 2014 as Tirlok Malik appreciation day.

He has line produced (USA Filming) and Some of the films starring India Superstar Rajinikanth, Kamal Hassan, Suriya, Sanjay Dutt, Mamoothy, Sunny Deol, Kangana Ranut, Manisha Koirala, Mithun Chakravarty, Anupam kher.

As an actor, he has worked in many television series, and films. He has been in many advertisements including for Campbell Soup, Channel 7 Eyewitness News, PBS Channel 13, Microsoft, Air India, and Nokia.

== Filmography ==
=== As an actor ===
Year	Film	Role	Notes
1982	Dard Ka Rishta	Dr. Khan	
1990	Lonely in America	Max	
1996	Taxi Bhaiya		
1997	Drown Soda	The Father	
1999	Mother	Trilok Mullic	
2000	Dr. Babasaheb Ambedkar	Lala Lajpatrai	
2001	American Desi	Mr. Saeed	
2001	The Favor	Vendor	aka "Mission" – Japan (English title) (festival title)
2001	Lajja	Trilok Mallik	aka "The Shame" – India (English title) (literal title)
2001	The Relay	Employee	TV Episode
2001	Third Watch	Employee	1 episode
2002	People I Know	Cab Driver	
2002	Gay	Wiry Guy	TV episode
2002	The Job	Wiry Guy	1 episode
2002	Kehtaa Hai Dil Baar Baar	Dr. Hemang Patel	"My Heart Keeps Repeating" – International (English title)
2003	Magic Magic 3D	Krishna	Tamil Film. Dubbed into Malayalam, Telugu & Hindi, with the Hindi dub being titled as Chota Jadugar (Little Magician)
2003	Arya	Om Dutt	
2005	True Crime: New York City		Video game
2005	Saving Face	Patel	TV episode
2005	Law & Order: Criminal Intent	Patel	aka "Law & Order: CI" – USA (promotional abbreviation)
2006	Quarter Life Crisis	Mr. Hauser	
2006	Vettaiyaadu Vilaiyaadu	Suspected Killer	
2007	Ta Ra Rum Pum	Restaurant owner	
2007	Sivaji	Friend of Sivaji	aka "Sivaji: The Boss" – India (English title) (long title); uncredited
2008	Mehbooba	Malik	
2008	When Kiran Met Karen	Cab Driver	
2008	A Jersey Christmas	Mahan	
2009	The Day the Bread Turned Green	Indian Baker	
2009	Anandha Thandavam	Hindu Priest	
2009	Extrospection	Ray	
2010	Khushiyaan	www.khushiyaanthefilm.com	
2014	On Golden Years	Vijay	
2015	15 August 1947	Host	
2021	To New India With Love	Prof. Khanna	

=== As a producer and filmmaker ===
Year	Film	Role	Notes
1990	Lonely in America	producer	shown in 74 countries, 37 film festivals, and HBO. cameo by Spike Lee. Directed by Barry Alexander Brown (Academy Awards nominee)
2000	Dr. Babasaheb Ambedkar	line producer: USA	Starring Mammootty, directed by Jabbar Patel, produced by NFDC and government of India
2003	Chota Jadugar	co-producer	... aka "Magic Magic 3D" – India (English title), India (Malayalam title)... aka "Little Magician" – India (English title)... aka "Small Magician" – India (English title)
2003	Arya	producer	Directed by Manan Katohora
2006	Vettaiyaadu Vilaiyaadu	line producer: USA	... aka "Hunt and Play" – International (English title) (informal literal title)... aka "Hunting Game" – Europe (English title) starring Kamal Haasan, Directed by Gautham Menon,
2007	Sivaji	line producer: USA	... aka "Sivaji: The Boss" – India (English title) (long title) starring Rajinikanth. Directed by S. Shankar
2008	Mehbooba	line producer: USA	Starring Sanjay Dutt, Manish Koirala. Directed by Afzal Khan
2008	Vaaranam Aayiram	line producer: USA	Starring Suriya, Simran, Ramya. Directed by Gautham Menon
2009	Anandha Thandavam	line producer: USA	Produced by Ascar Films. Directed by A.R. Gandhi Krishna.
2011	I Love New Year	line producer: USA	produced by T-Series, starring Kangana Ranaut, Sunny Deol. Directed by Radhika Rao, Vinay Sapru
2014	Purani Jeans	line producer: USA	produced by Eros Internationals
2014	On Golden Years	co-producer	produced by Golden Movies
2021	To New India With Love	producer	

=== As a writer and director ===
Year	Film	Role	Notes
1990	Lonely in America	story writer	
2010	Khushiyaan	writer, director	
2014	On Golden Years	writer, director	
2015	15 August 1947	writer, director	
2021	To New India With Love	director	

=== As a TV show producer ===
Year	Film	Role	Notes
	Namaste – I Love Making Films in New York! for Thirteen/WNET	TV show Producer	Emmy Award Nominee for show about Indian film-makers in the U.S. Aired on PBS.
	NRI TV/Film Awards Show	TV show Producer	Aired on TV-Asia
	How to Flirt, Date and Meet your Fate	TV show Producer	Based on Susan Rabin's best-selling book
	India at 0: A View from the NRIs of America	TV show Producer	About Non Resident Indians living outside India. Aired on Doordarshan (Indian National TV)
	Who Will Walk With Me?	TV show Producer	
	U.S. Immigration: Green Card	TV show Producer	
	15 August 1947	TV show Host and Producer	Co-produced with and Aired on Jus Punjabi TV (USA, Canada)
