= Malai Malai =

- Theatrical release poster
- Directed by: A. Venkatesh
- Written by: Pattukkottai Prabakar; (Dialogue)
- Screenplay by: A. Venkatesh
- Story by: A. Venkatesh
- Produced by: Mrs. Susil Mohan; M. Hemanth
- Starring: Arun Vijay; Prabhu; Vedhika; Kasthuri
- Cinematography: Venkatesh Anguraj
- Edited by: V. T. Vijayan
- Music by: Mani Sharma
- Production company: Feather Touch Entertainments
- Release date: 31 July 2009
- Country: India
- Language: Tamil

Malai Malai is a 2009 Indian Tamil-language masala film written and directed by A. Venkatesh. The film stars Arun Vijay, Prabhu, Vedhika, and Kasthuri in lead roles, while Prakash Raj, Santhanam, Ganja Karuppu, Vijayakumar, and S. N. Lakshmi play supporting roles. The music was composed by Mani Sharma with editing by V. T. Vijayan. The film released on 31 July 2009 and became a commercial success.

== Plot ==
Palanivel and Vetrivel are inseparable brothers who eke out a living as a farmer and minivan driver respectively in a village on the foothills of Palani temple. When Vetri falls in love with a city-based girl RJ Anjali, who is on a visit to Palani, he finds Lakshmi to romance his brother. Meanwhile, Vetri goes to Chennai in search of a job and his ladylove. He gets a job as a driver in a courier company, where Vimala Hassan, a fanboy of Kamal Haasan, is an employee and becomes Vetri's friend. Now enters Essaki, a dreaded don who controls the Saidapet area of the city. He initially helps Vetri but soon locks horns with him. Palani comes to Chennai to meet Vetri and runs into Essaki, and it is revealed that they are childhood friends. To not worry his brother, Vetri does not mention the ongoing feud between him and Essaki, and circumstances do not let Essaki and Vetri meet in front of Palani. After some twists and turns, Essaki learns that Vetri is Palani's brother and plans to kill him. However, he stabs Lakshmi, who saves Palani, and she succumbs to her wound. Devastated and enraged, Vetri fights Essaki, who gets the upper hand until Palani stabs him. The brothers then live a peaceful life, with Vetri marrying Anjali.

== Cast ==
- Arun Vijay as Vetrivel
- Prabhu as Palanivel
- Vedhika as Anjali
- Kasthuri as Lakshmi
- Prakash Raj as Essaki
- Santhanam as Vimala Haasan
- Ganja Karuppu as Karuppu
- Vijayakumar as Assistant Commissioner of Police
- Riyaz Khan as Deputy Commissioner
- S. N. Lakshmi as Vetri and Palani's grandmother
- Mayilsamy as Sketch Artist
- Aarthi as Arundathi
- O. A. K. Sundar as Pandidurai
- Kadhal Dhandapani
- Pandu
- Thambi Ramaiah
- Lollu Sabha Manohar
- Singamuthu
- Shakeela
- Crane Manohar
- Chelladurai as Potential bride's father
- Hemanth
- Bujji Babu
- Vengal Rao
- Vijay Ganesh
- Daisy Shah (special appearance in the song "Othaiku Othaiya")

== Production ==
Pooja Umashankar was originally cast as the lead actress, but later opted out. Instead, Vedhika was selected. The film was shot in locations including the Dhandayuthapani Swamy Temple in Palani, and Sriperumbudur.

== Soundtrack ==
The soundtrack is composed by Mani Sharma with lyrics by Vaali. The audio was launched by Suriya in June 2009.

Song	Singers
"Anbumanam"	Karthik, Rita Thyagarajan
"Nee Hello"	Jyotsna
"O Maare"	Ranjith, Saindhavi
"Othaikku Othaiyai"	Naveen, Rahul Nambiar
"Pooparikka"	Karthik, Shweta Mohan

== Release ==
Ahead of release, the makers pledged to donate the film's first-day gross in Tamil Nadu for charitable causes. The film was released on 31 July 2009, became a major success and revitalised Arun Vijay's previously struggling career. After the success of Malai Malai, the director and lead actor reunited for Maanja Velu.

== Critical reception ==
Pavithra Srinivasan of Rediff.com wrote: "Malai Malai is the sort of pot-boiler you can watch when you've got nothing else to do". Sify wrote, "a typical mass masala movie with all essential ingredients". The New Indian Express said it "may not have the greatest script, but it certainly is a vast improvement on the hero's earlier films". Chennai Online wrote, "Malai Malai might lack logic but it definitely has a magic to woo the masses".
