= Ramana (director) =

Indian film director

- Born: Tamil Nadu, India
- Occupation: Film director
- Years active: 2003–present

Ramana is an Indian film director, who has worked on Tamil films. After making his debut in 2003 with the successful Thirumalai, he has gone on to make other ventures, Sullan (2004) and Aathi (2006).

== Career ==
Ramana penned a series of film scripts featuring serious off-beat stories and approached producers with little luck, hoping to land an offer. He spent several years narrating the script of a proposed film titled Karkaalam to actors and then finally agreed terms with Prakash Raj to play the lead role during 1996, but no financiers eventually backed the project. After failing to establish himself as a director who could be funded to make films with serious themes, he felt that he should make a series of commercially viable films in the masala genre before diversifying into serious subjects. Ramana's first release was Thirumalai (2003), an action-masala venture featuring Vijay, which took a large opening at the box office and performed well commercially. He briefly began work on Parthasarathy, a project starring Vijayakanth in the lead but the film was later stalled. Despite receiving several offers to remake the film in Telugu, he chose to make Sullan (2004), an action film featuring Dhanush as the main hero, which was a flop at the box office. His next film, Aathi (2006) an action-masala venture featuring Vijay for the second time, took a large opening at the box office but turned out to be a disaster incurring ₹5 crore loss.

In 2007, he revealed that he was simultaneously working on a Telugu film featuring Mahesh Babu in the lead role, while Sarath Kumar had agreed to finance and star in his next Tamil film. However, neither of the projects materialised. He then briefly forayed into acting and was approached for a role in S. A. Chandrasekhar's Pandhayam (2008), before playing a pivotal role in an unreleased film titled Kuthirai. In 2011, it was reported that Ramana was suffering from throat cancer and would take a break from films. In July 2013, it was announced that he had recovered from the disease but had lost his voice permanently during his recovery.

== Filmography ==
=== As director ===
Year	Film
2003	Thirumalai
2004	Sullan
2006	Aathi

=== As actor ===
Year	Film	Role
2020	Varmaa	
2023	Dinosaurs	Arumugam
2024	Mazhai Pidikkatha Manithan	Daali's uncle
