= Ganga Gowri (1997 film) =

1997 film

- Title card
- Directed by: Madheswaran
- Written by: Madheswaran; Vasantharajan (dialogues)
- Produced by: N. Vishnuram
- Starring: Arun Vijay; Sangita; Mantra
- Cinematography: Kichaas
- Edited by: B. S. Vasu–Saleem
- Music by: Sirpy
- Production company: Ganga Gowri Production
- Release date: 11 September 1997
- Running time: 142 minutes
- Country: India
- Language: Tamil

Ganga Gowri is a 1997 Indian Tamil-language romantic comedy film directed by Madheswaran. The film stars Arun Vijay (credited as Arun Kumar), Sangita, and Mantra while Vadivelu, Dindigul I. Leoni, and Siva play supporting roles. It was released on 11 September 1997.

== Plot ==
Shiva and his brother Vichu are carefree youths, while their father Pandiyan is a miser. Shiva falls in love with Ganga at first sight and tries to seduce her with Vichu's help. Ultimately, Ganga also falls in love with him. Gowri comes from her village and begins to work in Pandiyan's house as a maid. A few months ago, Shiva was bitten by a snake, and Muthu saved him. Muthu cannot marry Gowri because of their horoscope. According to tradition, Gowri must marry another man for a week and then can marry Muthu. Shiva, grateful to Muthu for saving his life, married her and left the village. Thereafter, Gowri did not want to marry Muthu anymore. Muthu understood and advised her to rejoin Shiva. Finally, Pandiyan accepts the marriage of Shiva and Ganga. What transpires later forms the crux of the story.

== Cast ==
- Arun Vijay as Shiva
- Sangita as Gowri
- Mantra as Ganga
- Vadivelu as Vichu
- Dindigul I. Leoni as Pandiyan
- Siva as Muthu
- Vijaya Chandrika
- Pandu
- Vichu Viswanath
- Peeli Sivam
- Sirpy in a guest appearance

== Production ==
Ganga Gowri was Arun Kumar's second collaboration with production company Ganga Gowri Productions after their previous film Kathirunda Kadhal performed poorly. The film marked the directorial debut of Madheshwaran who previously assisted Aabavanan and Manobala.

== Soundtrack ==
The music was composed by Sirpy, with lyrics written by Palani Bharathi.

Song	Singer(s)	Duration
"Bull Bull Thara"	Mano	4:53
"Kadhal Solla Vandhen"	P. Unni Krishnan, Sujatha Mohan	4:51
"Kadhalare Kadhalare"	S. P. Balasubrahmanyam	4:55
"Margazhi Neerada"	Mano, Sirpy	5:14
"Poonthendrale Velaiyadu"	Mano, Sujatha Mohan	5:00
"Poovukkul Puthaiyal"	Mano	4:26
"Kadhalare Kadhalare" (film version)	Sirpy	4:55

== Reception ==
Ji of Kalki said most of the scenes are lively and comically moving with minimal characters but panned the old-fashioned thaali sentiment climax and dialogues.
