= Sindhamal Sitharamal =

- DVD cover
- Directed by: Shanmugavel
- Produced by: M. Thamizharasan
- Starring: Abbas; Nanditha; Sona
- Cinematography: Kumar V. Jay
- Edited by: Rajkeerthi
- Music by: Bharani
- Production company: Velu International
- Release date: 25 December 2003
- Country: India
- Language: Tamil

Sindhamal Sitharamal (transl. Without dropping, without spoiling) is a 2003 Indian Tamil-language romantic drama film directed by Shanmugavel in his debut. The film stars Abbas, Nanditha and Sona, while Karunas and Rajesh also appear in supporting roles. It was released on 25 December 2003.

== Cast ==
- Abbas as Saravanan
- Nanditha as Janaki
- Sona as Raziya
- Karunas as Saravanan's friend
- Rajesh as Kandasamy
- Ilavarasu as Roadside shop owner
- Chaplin Balu as Saravanan's friend
- Nellai Siva as Roadside restaurant owner
- Bose Venkat
- Sathya
- Benjamin as Saravanan's friend
- Action Prakash
- Lavanya as Saravanan's sister
- Vijaya Singh
- Srilatha
- Banu Balasubramaniyam
- Meera

== Production ==
The film marked the directorial debut of Shanmugavel who earlier assisted K. Bhagyaraj, Pandiarajan and Vikraman. Abbas was cast at the recommendation of distributors, as they felt the actor, despite not being an A-lister, was less risky than casting a newcomer due to having appeared in some high-profile films. Since Shanmugavel, a non-English speaker, wanted an actress who could speak in Tamil, Nanditha was cast.

== Soundtrack ==
Soundtrack was composed by Bharani.

Song	Singers	Lyrics
"Satrumun Kidaitha"	Harish Raghavendra, Srimathumitha	Yugabharathi
"Thee Thee"	Harish Raghavendra	Palani Bharathi
"Lub Tub"	Tippu	Ilayakamban
"Kalangathe"	Tippu	Ilayakamban
"Vaanavillin"	Unnikrishnan, Mahathi	Ilayakamban
"Vaanavillin"	Bharani	Ilayakamban

== Reception ==
Malathi Rangarajan from The Hindu stated, "it was a neat film which loses track towards the end" and added that "Shanmugavel ought to have avoided stuffing too many incidents into the storyline all of a sudden", while "at the same time he has to be complimented for a clean venture — a feature that is so hard to come by these days". Sify labelled the film as "average", noting that "Sona is strikingly sweet as Raziya and Abbas is back in form after a long break", while "Nandita come out with an impressive portrayal as Janaki". The critic added "surprisingly there is no mandatory comedy track and the debutant director has to be applauded for making a clean film".

Malini Mannath of Chennai Online wrote "It's a small budget film with no big names to boast of. But it's to the debutant director's credit that he has managed to give a fairly engaging product". Mister Lee of Kalki wrote though its a routine plot, debut director Shanumgavel surprises us by the way the plot is narrated praising the cinematography, Ilavarasu's humour but panned Nanditha's acting, characterisation of second heroine and villains.
