= Eera Nilam =

- DVD cover
- Directed by: Bharathiraja
- Screenplay by: Bharathiraja
- Story by: R. Selvaraj
- Produced by: Bharathiraja
- Starring: Manoj Bharathiraja; Nanditha; Suhasini Maniratnam
- Cinematography: C. Dhanapal
- Edited by: K. Palanivel
- Music by: Sirpy
- Production company: Manoj Creations
- Release date: 8 August 2003
- Country: India
- Language: Tamil

Eera Nilam (transl. Wetland) is a 2003 Indian Tamil-language war film co-written, produced and directed by Bharathiraja, starring his son Manoj and Nanditha. It was released on 8 August 2003, and won the Tamil Nadu State Film Award for Best Film while Thenmozhi won for Best Dialogue Writer.

== Cast ==
- Manoj Bharathiraja as Duraisamy
- Nanditha as Sornam
- Suhasini Maniratnam as Chinnathayi
- Vadivelu as Sonai
- Ilavarasu as Chellakannu
- Bose Venkat as Kalanjiam
- Rekha Unnikrishnan
- Sivakumar as Samuthram
- Kalidaas as Police officer

== Production ==
Venkat was cast after Bharathiraja was impressed with his performance in the TV series Metti Oli. It is the actor's film debut.

== Soundtrack ==
The soundtrack was composed by Sirpy.

Song	Singers	Lyrics
"Hey Sembaruthi"	Anuradha Sriram, Ranjith Govind	Kabilan
"Karisakaatu Kuiley"	Sujatha, Sirpy	Thenmozhi Dass
"Karpaga Maramum"	Anuradha Sriram, C. Sathya	Snehan
"Megam Karukuthu"	Ranjith Govind, Ganga	Na. Muthukumar
"Poonthene"	Chinmayi	Thenmozhi Dass

== Reception ==
Malathi Rangarajan of The Hindu wrote, "Bharathiraja has worked on R. Selvaraj's story and has come out with a screenplay that drags at times. But crisp, intelligent editing takes care of things". Visual Dasan of Kalki gave the verdict, "above average". Sify wrote, "There is no newness in the story as it is predictable as this village story is too dry and dull to absorb". The film won the Tamil Nadu State Film Award for Best Film, and Thenmozhi won for Best Dialogue Writer in the same ceremony.
