= Arun Vijay =

Indian actor (born 1974)

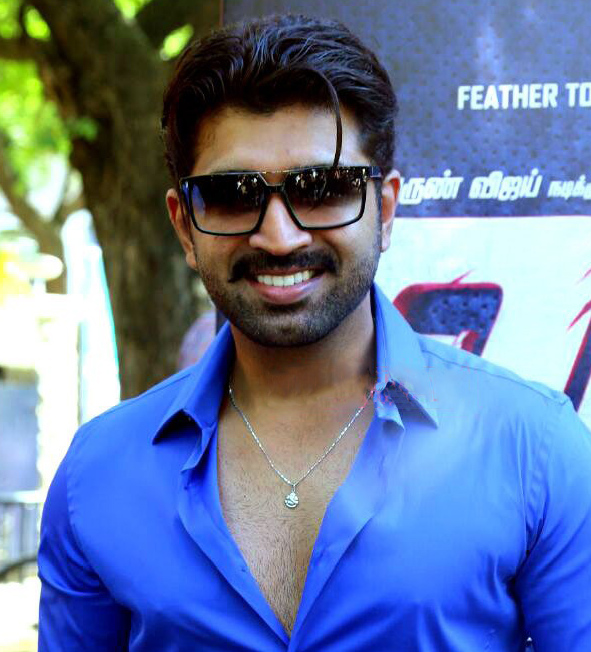
- Arun Vijay at Vaa Press Meet
- Born: Arun Kumar; 19 November 1974 (age 51); Madras, Tamil Nadu, India
- Education: Loyola College, Chennai
- Occupation: Actor
- Years active: 1995–present
- Spouse: Aarathi (m. 2006)
- Children: 2
- Parents: Vijayakumar; Muthukannu
- Relatives: Kavitha Vijayakumar (sister); Anitha Vijayakumar (sister); Vanitha Vijayakumar (half-sister); Preetha Vijayakumar (half-sister); Sridevi Vijaykumar (half-sister)

Arun Vijay (born 19 November 1974), formerly known as Arunkumar, is an Indian actor who works primarily in Tamil cinema. He also starred in a few films in Telugu, Kannada and Hindi.

Born as Arun Kumar and being the only son of veteran actor Vijayakumar, he debuted in Sundar C's Murai Mappillai (1995). He received early success in Thulli Thirintha Kaalam (1998) and Pandavar Bhoomi (2001).

After a string of failures, he changed his name to Arun Vijay and achieved breakthrough success and recognition for playing lead roles in Malai Malai (2009), Maanja Velu (2010), Thadaiyara Thaakka (2012), Kuttram 23 (2017), Chekka Chivantha Vaanam (2018), Thadam (2019), Mafia: Chapter 1 (2020) and Yaanai (2022). He is noted for his villainous roles in Yennai Arindhaal (2015), Bruce Lee: The Fighter (2015) and Chakravyuha (2016).

== Early life ==
Arun Vijay was born on 19 November 1974 as the only son to actor Vijayakumar vellalar and his first wife Muthukannu. His hometown is Nattuchalai ,Pattukkottai in Thanjavur District of Tamil Nadu.

He studied at Don Bosco Matriculation Higher Secondary School, Egmore. After completing his schooling, he joined Loyola college for his further studies.

== Career ==
=== 1995–2001 ===
Arun had a desire to act since childhood. He developed a strong interest by watching his father during film shoots. Arun started getting film offers when he was in tenth grade but his father wanted him to complete his schooling before acting in films.

Arun signed on for an A. R. Rahman musical Love Story to be his acting debut, but the delay of that project meant that he accepted Anbalaya Films' offer of Sundar C's Murai Mappillai (1995). He was 18 years old when he signed to act in Murai Mapillai. This made him one of the youngest actors to debut as a hero in the Tamil film industry.

In 1996, Arun's second film, Priyam, was released. He was seen for two films Kathirunda Kadhal (1997) and Ganga Gowri (1997).

In 1998, He played the lead role in director Balasekaran's film Thulli Thirintha Kaalam. It was produced by Kavithalayaa Productions, a company owned by K.Balachander.

In 2000, He featured in two films, Kannaal Pesavaa and Anbudan. His career hit a nadir when Buddhan, a project which he had physically transformed for, was stalled and dropped in 2000.

In 2001, he played a civil engineer in Pandavar Bhoomi, directed by Cheran. This was the first movie in which Arun and his father Vijayakumar acted together. This movie won the Tamil Nadu State Film Award for Best Film (Second Prize) in 2001.

=== 2002–2012 ===
Arun's next film was Mutham (2002). It was initially titled Muthamidalamma, but was changed after the censor screening. It was directed by S.A. Chandrasekhar and was the first film to be shot using digital cinematography in Tamil cinema. Arun had a special appearance in Iyarkai (2003), which won the National Film Award for Best Feature Film in Tamil.

He acted in director Ramesh Selvan's Jananam (2004). The film's actress Priyanka Trivedi could not fulfill her scheduled commitments in the film, as she got married in 2003. Critics appreciated Arun Vijay's acting in the movie. In 2006, he has given a matured performance in Azhagai Irukkirai Bayamai Irukkirathu. His next projects was Thavam (2007) and Vedha (2008).

The first venture, Malai Malai (2009), directed by A. Venkatesh, became a commercial success. The next, Maanja Velu (2010), by the same team, was also a success. Arun Vijay appeared in Magizh Thirumeni's action-thriller Thadaiyara Thaakka (2012), marking a move away from his previous two Masala films.

=== 2015–present ===
He starred in Yennai Arindhaal (2015) with actor Ajith Kumar. This was his first film with director Gautham Vasudev Menon. Arun played the role of Victor, an antagonist.

On September 1, 2015, He launched his own production company called In Cinemas Entertainment (ICE). He said that he launched the company to identify and provide an opportunity to ambitious and talented youngsters.

The same year, he debuted in Telugu in the film Bruce Lee - The Fighter (2015) as the lead antagonist. He also made his Kannada debut as the lead antagonist in the movie Chakravyuha in 2016. His next, Kuttram 23 (2017), returning to lead roles, was a success at the box office. His next movie was Chekka Chivantha Vaanam (2018), which was directed by Mani Ratnam with an ensemble cast.

In 2019, he acted in Thadam, an action crime thriller. He played his first double role in this film. This was also the second film in which he and Magizh Thirumeni worked together, after Thadaiyara Thaakka. The film was loosely based on various real-life crimes where the suspects are identical twins. Thadam's biggest strength was Arun's convincing performance as Kavin and Ezhil. In the action thriller film Saaho, Prabhas was the hero while Arun played a supporting role. In 2020, he appeared in action crime thriller Mafia: Chapter 1 that was directed by Karthick Naren. In the film, Arun Vijay played a narcotics police officer on a mission to hunt down a drug mafia kingpin.

In 2022, he appeared in the Amazon Prime Video film Oh My Dog. The cast included Arun Vijay, his father Vijayakumar, and his son Arnav Vijay. The next was Yaanai an action drama film written and directed by Hari. The next was released a Web Series Tamil Rockerz and later Sinam an investigative whodunit thriller in which Arun Vijay plays a cop. In 2024, A. L. Vijay's Mission: Chapter 1 was released in theatres on January 12. Arun Vijay will be seen in Bala's Vanangaan (2025) next. He did not perform as well as expected at the box office. He played the antagonist in Idli Kadai (2025), and his role in Dhanush's directorial received great praise from fans and critics. Followed by the action thriller film, Retta Thala (2025) where Arun Vijay plays dual roles.

== Personal life ==
In 2006, Arun Vijay married Aarathi, daughter of film producer Dr. N. S. Mohan. They have a daughter, Purvi and a son, Arnav Vijay. In 2010, Arun Vijay's sister Kavitha's daughter Hasini married N. S. Mohan's son Hemanth, who is a co-producer of Feather Touch Entertainments and also acted alongside Arun Vijay in Malai Malai.

== Filmography ==
=== Films ===
- Note: He was credited as Arunkumar (sometimes Arun) from 1995 to 2006. He was credited as Arun Vijay from 2007 onwards.

All films are in Tamil, unless otherwise noted.

Year	Title	Role(s)	Notes	Ref(s)
1995	Murai Mappillai	Raja	Debut film	
1996	Priyam	Arimath		
1997	Kathirunda Kadhal	Mayilsamy		
1997	Ganga Gowri	Shiva		
1998	Thulli Thirintha Kalam	Ashok		
2000	Kannaal Pesavaa	Arun		
2000	Anbudan	Sathya		
2001	Pandavar Bhoomi	Tamizharasan		
2002	Mutham	Bharath		
2003	Iyarkai	Mukundan	Cameo appearance	
2004	Jananam	Surya		
2006	Azhagai Irukkirai Bayamai Irukkirathu	Prem		
2007	Thavam	Subramaniam		
2008	Vedha	Vijay		
2009	Malai Malai	Vetrivel		
2010	Thunichal	Shiva		
2010	Maanja Velu	Velu		
2012	Thadaiyara Thaakka	Selva	Also singer for "Poondamalli Thaan"	
2015	Vaa Deal	Vetrivel	Unreleased Film	
2015	Yennai Arindhaal	Victor Manoharan		
2015	Bruce Lee: The Fighter	Deepak Raj	Telugu film	
2016	Chakravyuha	Omkaar	Kannada film	
2017	Kuttram 23	ACP Vetrimaaran		
2018	Chekka Chivantha Vaanam	Thyagarajan "Thyagu" Senapathi		
2019	Thadam	Ezhil and Kavin	25th Film; Dual role	
2019	Saaho	Vishwank Roy / Iqbal	Bilingual film in Telugu and Hindi	
2020	Mafia: Chapter 1	Aryan and Dileep "Dexter"	Dual role	
2022	Oh My Dog	Shankar		
2022	Yaanai	Ravichandran		
2022	Sinam	Sub-Inspector Paari Venkat	Also playback singer	
2022	Agni Siragugal	Ranjith	Unreleased Film	
2023	Borrderr	Aravind Chandrasekhar	Unreleased Film	
2024	Mission: Chapter 1	Gunasekhar aka Guna		
2025	Vanangaan	Koti		
2025	Idli Kadai	Ashwin		
2025	Retta Thala	Malpe Upendra and Kaali	Dual role	
2026	M Muthaiya direction (Arun Vijay 37)	TBA	Filming	

=== Web series ===
Year	Title	Role	Network	Notes	Ref.
2022	Tamil Rockerz	Rudhra IPS	SonyLIV	Based on the infamous torrent site of the same name	

=== As dubbing artist ===
Year	Title	Role	Dub-over voice for whom	Notes	Ref.
2019	Aladdin	Hakim	Numan Acar	Tamil dubbed version	

== Awards and nominations ==
Arun Vijay awards and nominations
Awards and nominations
Award	Wins	Nominations

Totals (Note: Certain award groups do not simply award one winner. They acknowledge several different recipients, have runners-up, and have third place. Since this is a specific recognition and is different from losing an award, runner-up mentions are considered wins in this award tally. For simplification and to avoid errors, each award in this list has been presumed to have had a prior nomination.)
- Wins: 5
- Nominations: 5

Year	Award	Category	Film	Result	Ref.
2016	Filmfare Awards South	Best Supporting Actor – Tamil	Yennai Arindhaal	Nominated	
2016	Edison Awards	Best Villain	Yennai Arindhaal	Won	
2016	Norway Tamil Film Festival Awards	Best Villain	Yennai Arindhaal	Won	
2016	South Indian International Movie Awards	Best Actor in a Negative Role	Yennai Arindhaal	Won	
2017	South Indian International Movie Awards	Best Actor in a Negative Role	Chakravyuha	Nominated	
