= Varalaru =

2006 Indian film by K. S. Ravikumar

- Theatrical release poster
- Directed by: K. S. Ravikumar
- Screenplay by: K. S. Ravikumar
- Story by: R. K. Celluloids; Ravi Chakravarthy
- Produced by: S. S. Chakravarthy
- Starring: Ajith Kumar; Asin; Kanika
- Cinematography: P.C. Sreeram; Priyan; Arthur A. Wilson; S. Murthy; K. Prasad
- Edited by: K. Thanigachalam
- Music by: A. R. Rahman
- Production company: NIC Arts
- Distributed by: Film Fabricators
- Release date: 20 October 2006
- Running time: 166 minutes
- Country: India
- Language: Tamil
- Budget: ₹12 crore
- Box office: est. ₹25–55 crore

Varalaru: History Of Godfather, or simply known as Varalaru (transl. History), is a 2006 Indian Tamil-language action drama film co-written and directed by K. S. Ravikumar, and produced by S. S. Chakravarthy under the banner NIC Arts. The film stars Ajith Kumar in the main triple lead role as a father and his two twin sons. Asin, Kanika, Ramesh Khanna, Suman Setty, Sujatha and M. S. Baskar play supporting roles. The film's soundtrack and background score were composed by A. R. Rahman. Prior to its release, the film was known by the title Godfather, but following the Government of Tamil Nadu's motion to exempt tax on films titled in Tamil, the title was changed to Varalaru.

After two years of production, the film was released on 20 October 2006 on the eve of Diwali, and emerged as the highest-grossing movie of the year in Tamil Nadu, & 2nd highest grossing Tamil movie of the year after Vettaiyaadu Vilaiyaadu. The film has been remade in Kannada, titled after the original title of the film, in Burmese as Nat Khat Mhar Tae Tite Pwal, and in Odia as Tu Mo Dehara Chhai.

== Plot ==
Shivashankar, a crippled wheelchair-using multimillionaire, has a son Vishnu who is spoilt. To teach him responsibility, Shivashankar sends Vishnu to Thottapuram to help the poor. Vishnu does not want to go, but a local pizza restaurateur convinces him and his friends that the village is one big brothel. Thottapuram is a sacred village and the restaurateur had purposefully deceived Vishnu and his friends. Divya and her college mates are also visiting the village for their social activity course to improve the villagers' health and hygiene. A large building is reserved for him and the girls are asked to stay in the poor families' houses.

Vishnu and his friends arrive and start to woo the girls, whom they mistake for Thottapuram's prostitutes. When Divya discovers their plan, she and her friends decide to teach Vishnu and his friends a lesson.

Vishnu and his friends are wooed by Divya and the other girls. They are led to separate rooms where the girls inject a serum that makes them itch all over. They leave, screaming and scratching. Vishnu tells Divya to leave her profession and offers to save her honour by marrying her in the village temple the next day. Divya does not come, but Vishnu and his friends happen to see her leaving on a bus bearing the name of the girls' college, revealing that they have been duped. But, Divya is guilt ridden when she sees him holding a mangalasutra and realising he is genuinely prepared to marry her.

Depressed and feeling cheated, Vishnu returns home, where Shivashankar discovers that his son has fallen in love. Under his influence, Vishnu and Divya get engaged. Everything goes well until one night, Vishnu goes to Divya's house in a drunken state after a party in the nightclub. Her family prevents him from talking to her. This eventually leads to a fight. Vishnu then goes to Divya's cousin's house to apologise for his behaviour, but suddenly attempts to rape her which horrifies Divya. Vishnu then tries to kill Shivashankar, but is stopped by Ko Thandam, Shivashankar's P.A., who got stabbed by Vishnu. Disappointed with Vishnu's behaviour, Shivashankar sends him to a psychiatrist.

It is then revealed that Jeeva, Vishnu's younger twin, had taken over his identity, took money from the bank, got drunk, went to Divya's place and attempted to rape her cousin. Jeeva hates Shivashankar for abandoning him and his mentally-challenged mother Gayathri. Later, Divya manages to sneak into Vishnu's room in the hospital and believes that he is innocent. She leaves and shortly afterwards, Jeeva appears, smuggles Vishnu out of the hospital, takes over his identity and goes to kill Shivashankar. The father realises that it is not his son after he gets a call from Vishnu and gets out of his wheelchair to defend himself, much to Jeeva's surprise. Vishnu arrives at the scene, surprised that his father is able to walk and demands an explanation. The film goes to a flashback.

Shivashankar was a Bharatanatyam dancer who behaved effeminately due to dancing and the upbringing by his mother, whom he loved dearly. His mother had arranged for Shivashankar to marry Gayathri, who was her friend's daughter. He agreed but Gayathri rejected Shivashankar for being too effeminate and insulted him in front of the wedding guests. Unable to bear the embarrassment, Shivashankar's mother died on the spot. Enraged, Shivashankar raped Gayathri, who became pregnant. The doctor refused to perform an abortion, leading to Vishnu's birth. Shivashankar took Vishnu from Gayathri, saying that the child would be the only hope of his life. But, unknown to Shivashankar, right after he left Gayathri gave birth to the baby's twin, Jeeva.

Jeeva now threatens to kill Shivashankar at Vishnu's and Divya's wedding. Shivashankar fights with Jeeva and attempts to stop him. Jeeva points a gun at Shivashankar and reveals that he is also Shivashankar's son and the reason why he came to kill Shivashankar. Jeeva's grandmother also tells Shivashankar that he is also his son and that Gayathri actually became insane when baby Jeeva was about to get hit by a lorry. Jeeva realises his mistake. He wants Shivashankar to shoot him, but a police officer mistakenly thinks that Jeeva is pointing the gun at Shivashankar. He fires at Jeeva, but Shivashankar intervenes, gets shot in the attack and dies. Jeeva accepts Shivashankar's apology and is then jailed.

Weeks later, Gayathri does not accept food from anyone, until Vishnu comes and dresses as Jeeva and feeds her. The film ends with Vishnu telling her that Shivashankar is the godfather of the family. During the credits, the film shows what really happened in the first half.

== Cast ==
- Ajith Kumar in a triple role as:
  - Shivashankar
  - Vishnu
  - Jeeva
- Asin as Divya
- Kanika as Gayathri
- Sujatha as Gayathri's mother
- Rajesh as the Assistant Commissioner of Police
- Vijayan as Divya's father
- Mansoor Ali Khan as Divya's brother
- Ponnambalam as Divya's brother
- Ramesh Khanna as Ramesh, Vishnu's friend
- Pandu as Kodandam
- Santhana Bharathi as Gayathri's servant
- Manobala as a police constable
- Suman Setty as Urundai, Vishnu's friend
- Rajalakshmi as Shivashankar's mother
- Crane Manohar as an asylum patient
- Idichapuli Selvaraj as Shivashankar's servant
- M. S. Baskar as an asylum patient
- Shivashankar as Shiva Shankar's master
- Chitti Babu as a police inspector
- Madhan Bob as the coffee shop owner
- Reena as Saroja
- Johnny as Vishnu's friend
- Kadhal Kanth as Vishnu's friend
- Japan Kumar as Japan, Vishnu's friend
- Scissor Manohar as a waiter
- Bava Lakshmanan as a police constable
- Robert (special appearance in the song "Ilamai")
- K. S. Ravikumar as a doctor and Gayathri's family friend (director and special appearance)

== Production ==
As per director R. Sundarrajan, Varalaru's original base story was scripted by him for Kamal Haasan under the Sivaji Productions banner. This did not happen, however, due to Haasan's unwillingness to work with Sundarrajan as he did not like the script. Haasan felt it would portray him as a womaniser.

In late 1999, K. S. Ravikumar narrated two scripts to Haasan. One was about a transgender incorporating three roles titled Madana and a comedy script Thenali. Haasan was impressed with both but turned the former offer down due to his conflicting schedule at the time. Rajinikanth had agreed to do the story titled Madana if Haasan opted out. Ravikumar was forced to pull out of a project titled Jaggubhai which he had written and begun directing and consequently signed on Ajith Kumar, who had just opted out of A. R. Murugadoss's action film, Mirattal. Later, the project shifted to the hands of NIC Arts (from Sri Surya Movies) due to a higher budget.

The filming of Godfather began by November 2004. Asin was cast as the lead actress and the film was to be produced by S. S. Chakravarthy. Early reports suggested that one of Ajith's roles in the film would be an eunuch or a transgender, but his role turned out to be that of an effeminate classical dancer.

In early 2005, production began facing delays. Ajith fell out with the producer, who had made several films with him in the past and Ravikumar was trying to reconcile then to finish production. Actress Meena, who was supposed to do play Gayatri, opted out due a conflicting schedule. Devayani was also considered for the role but she refused, and eventually Kaniha was signed. Problems arose in mid-2005, when Asin could not allot dates for the film due to her work in Ghajini, Majaa and Sivakasi. Chakravarthy later reported Ajith for the delays and before further problems occurred, L. Suresh of Ananda Pictures, a leading Chennai based distributor, intervened and solved the existing problems by providing an interest-free loan. Subsequently, the film became trouble free but took more than a year to finish the remaining portions and only released in October 2006 as Ajith prioritised completing Paramasivan and Thirupathi, both also released in 2006. Meanwhile, the title Godfather was changed to Varalaru after the state government gave an order to grant entertainment tax exemption to films titled in Tamil.

== Music ==
Varalaaru

Soundtrack album by A. R. Rahman
- Released: 27 September 2006
- Recorded: 2005–2006
- Genre: Feature film soundtrack
- Length: 48:07
- Language: Tamil
- Label: Star Music
- Producer: A. R. Rahman

A. R. Rahman chronology
Sillunu Oru Kaadhal (2006)	Varalaaru (2006)	Guru (2007)

The film's soundtrack and background score were composed by A. R. Rahman, marking his fourth collaboration with Ravikumar after Muthu (1995), Padayappa (1999), Thenali (2000) and third with Ajith Kumar after Pavithra (1994) and Kandukondain Kandukondain (2000). He finished composing all the songs for the film by December 2004. The soundtrack features nine songs, with lyrics written by Vairamuthu. The song "Ilamai" features a remix version, and "Innisai" features a reprise and an extended version of the song which is used in the film. The album was released on 27 September 2006.

All lyrics are written by Vairamuthu.

Track list
No.	Title	Singer(s)	Length
1.	"Ilamai"	Mohammed Aslam, Pop Shalini, Tanvi Shah	5:22
2.	"Ilamai" (Remix)	Suresh Peters, Blaaze	4:01
3.	"Innisai"	Mahathi, Saindhavi, Naresh Iyer	5:14
4.	"Innisai" (Reprise)	Mahathi, Saindhavi	3:44
5.	"Innisai Alapadaiye" (Film Version)	Mahathi, Saindhavi, Naresh Iyer	6:33
6.	"Kamma Karaiyila"	Naresh Iyer, Sowmya Raoh	5:32
7.	"Kaatril Oar Vaarthai"	S. P. Balasubrahmanyam, Sadhana Sargam, Reena Bhardwaj	6:03
8.	"Theeyil Vizhuntha"	A. R. Rahman	6:17
9.	"Thotha Puram"	Kalpana Raghavendar, Ranjith, Leon James, Peer Mohammed, Sonu Kakkar	5:38
Total length:			48:07

== Release ==
Varalaru released on 20 October 2006, during the Diwali season alongside Vallavan, E, Vattaram, Dharmapuri and Thalaimagan, and emerged as the biggest hit of the year. Varalaru opened in over 300 screens worldwide including 25 screens in Chennai district. It ran for 210 days and also went on to become Ajith Kumar's biggest grosser and his best film to date until the release of his 2007 film, Billa.

== Reception ==
The critic from The Hindu gave a verdict that the film "scores in pace and performance" and mentioned that "Ajith's skills as a performer have been appreciably honed and efficiently used" and that it is a "milestone in Ajith's cinema efforts, the film has the potential to propel its hero into a higher league in stardom", while describing Asin as "lustrous and sails through her role smoothly", while Kanika "gets more scope, which she makes good use of". Rediff.com also gave the film a positive review claiming that "Varalaaru is undoubtedly the only must-watch release this Diwali. Watch it for a display of all the elements of Ajith's versatility and range of emotions".

Sify wrote, "Try and try till you exceed all limits, seems to be director K.S.Ravikumar’s mantra. His Varalaaru has a wafer-thin story and is tackily executed. Though the film offers little in the way of surprise or newness, what makes it watchable is Ajit and his triple role". Lajjavathi of Kalki praised the performance of Ajith in triple roles, Kanika's acting and Rahman's music but panned the placement of songs and was critical of certain scenes and concluded saying its definitely ascent to Ajith. Ajith subsequently won the Filmfare Award for Best Actor – Tamil for 2006 for his triple role performance.

== Remakes ==
In 2012, cinematographer Sethu Sriram opted to remake the film in Kannada under the original title, Godfather. The movie was unofficially remade in 2015 in Burmese as Nat Khat Mhar Tae Tite Pwal and in Odia as Tu Mo Dehara Chhai.
