= Musics =

Musics may refer to:

- Musics (album), an album by Dewey Redman
- Musics (magazine), a magazine covering free improvised music

== See also ==
- Music (disambiguation)
- S Musics
