= Perarasu =

Indian film director

- Born: 8 January 1967 (age 59); Nattarasankottai, Sivaganga, Tamil Nadu
- Occupations: Film director, Music director
- Years active: 2005–present
- Spouses: Shanthi (divorced); Krishnaveni

Perarasu (born 8 January 1967) is an Indian film director who works primarily in Tamil cinema and is best known for masala films with Vijay and Bharath.

== Personal life ==
Perarasu, was born on 8 January 1967 in Natarasankottai in Sivaganga district, Tamil Nadu.

Perarasu married Shanthi at Nattarasankottai on June 11, 2000, and a girl child Viruthika was born to them in July 2001. When Shanthi conceived a second time, she was given abortion pills and fell ill, where she was sent by Perarasu to her parents. A panchayat was summoned and they started living together. However, Perarasu insisted Shanthi in moving to Nattarasankottai. During this time, Perarasu received an explicit divorce decree without Shanthi's knowledge. Shanthi took steps to have the decree rescinded and moved the JM court to Bhavani, who asked Perarasu to pay child support. Though Perarasu had filed a petition challenging the order, neither he and his counsel appeared in court when the matter was called on five occasions. On September 12, 2007, a judicial magistrate court in Bhavani in Erode district, directed Perarasu to pay alimony of ₹10,000 a month to Shanthi and ₹5,000 a month to their daughter. Perarasu later married Krishnaveni.

== Career ==
Perarasu tried for 7 to 8 years to make it big in cinema industry and had some off-beat stories. When Perarasu was new to Chennai, he used to frequent AVM Productions and stand in front of the studios longing to visit the place, where he also bribed a production in charge ₹10 rupees one day and got himself into the studios. Perarasu's 15–16 years experience in the industry taught him to analyse the pulse of the audience and give them what they want. He honed his skills under Rama Narayanan and N. Maharajan. Apart from assisting, Perarasu appeared in few films doing small uncredited roles.

Perarasu made his directorial debut with Thirupaachi starring Vijay in the lead role as his 40th film. The film was released on the eve of Pongal and received positive reviews from critics claiming that "you may strive hard to find anything new in Tirupachi, which is old wine served in a new bottle, with a different label". Thirupaachi became a commercial success by completing and 200 days in theatres.

After the success of Thirupaachi, Perarasu collaborated with Vijay again for Sivakasi, which also marks Vijay's third collaboration with A. M. Rathnam after Kushi and Ghilli. The film was released on Diwali to positive reviews from critics and eventually became a successful venture claiming that ""This formula had worked well for director Perarasu and Vijay in Thirupaachi and now the team has re-worked it. This time, however, it will test your patience as it is not meant for the class audience or those seeking quality entertainment. Perarasu and Vijay believe only in catering to the mass audience who want their dose of unpretentious masala mix"

During the making of Sivakasi, representatives from AVM Productions approached Perarasu to make a film with Ajith Kumar in the lead role. The director immediately accepted the offer and told the producer the story of the film during the meeting and the film was announced publicly two days later. In August 2005, it became clear that the film would begin in November and that Riyaz Khan would play the lead antagonist role in the project. Sadha was signed on to play the lead role after early reports suggested that either Nayanthara, Renuka Menon or Gopika would play the lead female role. The film was named Thirupathi and was launched officially on 15 September 2005 with Vijay attending the opening ceremony. The film was critically panned with critics claiming that the film drew too much resemblance to Perarasu's previous projects, but became a commercial success.

After the success of Thirupathi, Perarasu announced a project called "Pandigai" with S. J. Suryah, but the project was cancelled and he announced his next project Dharmapuri with Vijayakanth in 2006 since Rathnam expressed his desire of Perarasu directing a film for him again after Sivakasi. When Rathnam and Vijayakanth heard the ‘one liner’ of the film, they both liked it instantly and thus Dharmapuri was created without even a heroine.

Perarasu's next film was Pazhani, starring Bharath and Kajal Aggarwal, but became an above average venture at the box office. He then directed films like Thiruvannamalai and Thiruthani. Thiruvannamalai was a commercial success, but Thiruthani became a box-office bomb. Later, Perarasu made his directorial debut in Malayalam with Samrajyam 2, which was also partially reshot in Tamil as Tihar. Samrajyam 2 was the sequel of Samrajyam which starred Mammootty in the lead role. The Malayalam and Tamil versions received negative reviews from critics and became a box-office bomb.

== Filmmaking style ==
Perarasu primarily directs films he claims are "aimed at the common man who looks at pure entertainment" rather than critics or intellectuals. Due to his films being named after towns and cities, Perarasu has been nicknamed "Oorarasu" by the media, the term being a portmanteau of "oor" (meaning town or city) and his name Perarasu.

== Filmography ==
- All films are in Tamil, unless otherwise noted.

=== As film director ===
Year	Film	Language	Notes
2005	Thirupaachi	Tamil	
2005	Sivakasi	Tamil	
2006	Thirupathi	Tamil	Tamil Nadu State Film Award for Best Story Writer
2006	Dharmapuri	Tamil	
2008	Pazhani	Tamil	
2008	Thiruvannamalai	Tamil	
2012	Thiruthani	Tamil	Also music composer
2015	Samrajyam II: Son of Alexander	Malayalam	Partially reshot in Tamil as Tihar

As lyricist

Year	Title	Song	Composer	Notes
2005	Thirupaachi	all songs	Dhina	
2005	Sivakasi	all songs	Srikanth Deva	
2006	Vallavan	Ammadi Aathadi	Yuvan Shankar Raja	
2006	Kedi	Aatha Unnai	Yuvan Shankar Raja	
2006	Dharmapuri	all songs	Srikanth Deva	
2006	Thirupathi	all songs	Bharathwaj	
2007	Madurai Veeran	Gokka Makka	Srikanth Deva	
2008	Pazhani	all songs	Srikanth Deva	
2008	Thiruvannamalai	all songs	Srikanth Deva	
2009	Rajadhi Raja	all songs	Karunas	
2012	Thiruthani	all songs	Himself	
2022	Coffee with Kadhal	Thiyagi Boys	Yuvan Shankar Raja	

As singer

Year	Title	Song	Composer	Co-artists	Notes
2006	Dharmapuri	"Vandha Vaadi"	Srikanth Deva	Suchithra	
2008	Pazhani	"Loc Loc Local"	Srikanth Deva	Suchithra	

As actor

Year	Film	Role	Notes
1990	Sathan Sollai Thattathe	guy at park	credited as Ma. Perarasu
1999	Ethirum Pudhirum	Doctor	Uncredited
2004	Arasatchi	Reporter	Uncredited
2005	Sivakasi	Himself	Cameo appearance
2006	Thirupathi	Auto driver	Cameo appearance
2006	Dharmapuri	Lawyer	Cameo appearance
2007	Puli Varudhu	Himself	Cameo appearance in a song "Kanava Nejama"
2008	Pazhani	Thiruthani	Cameo appearance
2008	Thiruvannamalai	Dr. Swamy Malai	Cameo appearance
2008	Pandhayam	Himself	Cameo appearance
2012	Thiruthani	Ramalingam	Cameo appearance
2013	Onbadhula Guru	Himself	Cameo appearance in song "Vaa Machi"
2015	Samrajyam II: Son of Alexander		Malayalam film; cameo appearance in song "Megathin Meethada"
2021	Minmini		
2024	Petta Rap	Himself	Cameo appearance
2024	Uppu Puli Kaaram	Yashoda's lawyer	Web series
2025	Central		
2026	Parundhu		
