= Fathima Babu =

Indian actress

- Born: Fathima; Puducherry, India
- Occupations: Actress; Former newsreader
- Years active: 1996–present
- Spouse: Babu (m. 1989)
- Children: 2

Fathima Babu (née Fathima) is an Indian actress, former newsreader and socialite based in Chennai who hails from Puducherry. She began her public career as a newsreader with DD Podhigai, the Tamil version of Doordarshan news, and later worked for Jaya TV. She subsequently moved on to work in television serials, films and theatre performances, operating in the Tamil and Malayalam languages.

== Personal life ==
Fathima was born in a Malayali family based in Puducherry. She has a degree in commerce. Initially a Muslim, Fathima converted to Hinduism after marrying Babu, who she had met while working at Indian Oil Corporation. The couple, married since 1989, has two sons.

== Career ==
Fathima became a newsreader with DD Podhigai, the Tamil version of Doordarshan, in the late 1980s. In 1989, she briefly went missing causing much speculation as to her disappearance. Several years later, Fathima clarified that during the period she was missing, she was filming for a television serial known as Chithirapaavai and did not want to breach Doordarshan's rule of news anchors not being able to work in serials.

Fathima made her film debut through K. Balachander's feminist film Kalki (1996), where she starred alongside an ensemble cast of Shruti, Rahman, Prakash Raj, Geetha, and Renuka. The film garnered positive reviews, with a film critic noting that Fathima "has an impressive debut, performing with confidence". Fathima moved on to play supporting roles in films, often portraying the mother of the lead characters.

Fathima started her own drama production group, Fab's Theatre, which performs shows in Chennai. She was initially introduced to theatre by K. Balachander, who often helped her work on and develop scripts. The group has made shows such as Sethu Vandirikkaen and Thaarama Tallyaa directed by Fathima, which opened in February 2016. She was also briefly involved in politics, and campaigned for the AIADMK on behalf of Jayalalithaa, and eventually took up a role as a spokesperson of the party. After Jayalalithaa's death, Fathima joined O. Paneerselvam's team, before ultimately distancing herself from politics. In 2019, she appeared in the reality television show Bigg Boss Tamil 3 on Star Vijay, and was the first contestant to be evicted.

== Films ==
=== Tamil ===
Year	Film	Role	Notes
1996	Kalki	Kokila	
1997	Pasamulla Pandiyare		
1997	V. I. P.	Priya's mother	
1997	Nerukku Ner	Alamu	
1998	Ulavuthurai	Sangeetha's mother	
1998	Swarnamukhi	Vanaja	
1998	Thulli Thirintha Kaalam	Visalam	
1998	Sollamale	Vikram's mother	
1998	Unnidathil Ennai Koduthen	Vasanthi, Radha's stepmother's younger sister	
1998	Simmarasi	Maragatham's wife	
1998	Kannathal	Kannatha's mother	
1998	Kalyana Galatta	Commissioner's wife	
1999	Ninaivirukkum Varai	Sandhya's mother	
1999	Nee Varuvai Ena	Subramani's mother	
1999	Mugam		
1999	Mudhalvan	Aranganathar's wife	
1999	Unnaruge Naan Irundhal	Jamindar's wife	
1999	Ponnu Veetukkaran	Gangadaran's wife	
2000	Mugavaree	Viji's mother	
2000	Unnai Kodu Ennai Tharuven	Indu's mother	
2000	Simmasanam	Annapoorani's sister-in-law	
2000	Parthen Rasithen	Pinky Raja	
2000	Ilaiyavan		
2000	Anbudan	Sathya's mother	
2000	Ninaivellam Nee	Nurse	
2001	Minnale	Shanti, Reena's mother	
2001	Paarvai Ondre Podhume	Visalakshi	
2001	Little John	Nirmala	
2001	Manadhai Thirudivittai	Shruti's mother	
2001	Aalavandhan	Tejaswini's mother	
2001	Love Marriage	Shreekanth's mother	
2002	Alli Arjuna	Usha	
2002	Youth	Sandhya's mother	
2003	Manasellam	Bala's mother	
2003	Lesa Lesa	Varalakshmi	
2003	Aahaa Ethanai Azhagu		
2003	Thithikudhe	Venu's adopted mother	
2003	Thathi Thavadhu Manasu		
2003	Indru	Gauthaman's mother	
2004	Kavithai		
2005	Thirupaachi	Raj's wife	
2005	Kannadi Pookal		
2005	Devathaiyai Kanden	Uma's mother	
2005	Amudhey	Nancy's mother	
2005	Thirudiya Idhayathai		
2006	Thirupathi	Minister's wife	
2007	Adavadi		
2007	En Uyirinum Melana	Kamakshi	
2007	18 Vayasu Puyale	Seetha	
2008	Kuselan	Sister Maria	Simultaneously shot in Telugu as Kathanayakudu
2008	Saroja	Car passenger	Special appearance
2008	Vasool	Angayarkanni	
2008	Thithikkum Ilamai	Defense lawyer	
2011	Sabash Sariyana Potti	"Sabash Sariyana Potti" judge	
2011	Kasethan Kadavulada		
2011	Kaila Kaasu Vaaila Thosa		
2012	Thiruthani	Andiyappan's wife	
2013	Puthagam	Veni	
2013	Naanum En Jamunavum		
2013	Thirumathi Thamizh		
2013	Chithirayil Nilachoru	Church mother	
2013	Maayai		
2014	Azhagiya Pandipuram	Madhavan's mother	
2014	Nee Naan Nizhal	Rohit's mother	
2014	Namma Gramam	Karthyayani	
2015	Muthukumar Wanted	Anandhi's mother	
2016	Jennifer Karuppaiya	Court Judge	
2020	Vidhipadi	Jennifer's mother	Short film
2025	Mrs & Mr	Ranganayaki	

=== Malayalam ===
Year	Film	Role	Notes
2001	Raavanaprabhu	Mundakkal Sekharan's wife	
2002	Onnaman	Deepa	
2007	Ali Bhai	Ambu Bhai's wife	
2007	Hallo	Shivaraman's mother	
2008	Madampi	Shyamala's mother	
2009	My Big Father	Alby's mother	
2009	Bhramaram	Sivankutty's sister	
2010	Oru Naal Varum	School Principal	
2010	Alexander the Great	Sumithra	
2010	Shikkar	Manu's mother	
2011	Kottarathil Kutty Bhootham		
2011	Traffic	Raihan's mother	
2012	The King & the Commissioner	Justice Eliyamma Pettikaran	
2012	Josettante Hero	Sajan's mother	
2012	Grandmaster	Alice	
2012	Gramam	Karthyayani	Simultaneously shot in Tamil as Namma Gramam
2012	Matinee	Fathima	
2014	@Andheri	Appu's mother	
2014	1 by Two	Ammukkuty Amma	
2014	Asha Black	Rohit's mother	Simultaneously shot in Tamil as Nee Naan Nizhal

=== Telugu ===
Year	Film	Role	Notes
2005	Gowtam SSC	Chaya Rani (Gowtam's Mother)	
2008	Kadhanayakudu	Sister Maria	

== Dramas ==
Year	Film	Role	Actor	Director	Written By	Ref.
2013	Ponniyin Selvan	Nandhini	Yes	No	Kalki Krishnamurthy	
2014	Koodi Vaazhnthal (Short Play)	—N/a	No	Yes	Aashiq Babu	
2014	Seethai Mark Seeyakaithool (Short Play)	Subbamma	Yes	Yes	Sundara Ramasamy	
2014	Aan Dharmam (Short Play)	Paanjali	Yes	Yes	Jayanthan	
2014	Thappattam (Short Play)	—N/a	No	Yes	Vaseekaran	
2014	Naan Avan Illai (Short Play)	—N/a	No	Yes	Chelli Sreenivasan	
2015	Sethu Vandhirukken	Vanaja	Yes	Yes	K. Balachander	
2016	Thaarama Tallyaa	Radha	Yes	Yes	Chitralaya Sriram	
2019	Valayil Sikkiya Meen		Yes	No		

== Television ==
Year	Program	Role	Channel	Language	Notes
1989	Chithirappaavai	Saradha	DD Podhigai	Tamil	
1997	Nila Pookkal	Possessive wife	Star Vijay	Tamil	Telefilm
1999	Chinna Chinna Aassai : Suyamvaram		Varnam TV	Tamil	
2001	Kaveri		Sun TV	Tamil	
2003–2005	Priyanka	Indrani	ETV	Telugu	
2005	Kadamattathu Kathanar	Nicolas's Mother	Asianet	Malayalam	
2006–2008	Lakshmi	Chandra	Sun TV	Tamil	
2006–2007	Raja Rajeshwari	Lakshmi Amma	Sun TV	Tamil	
2007	Swami Ayyappan	Unnikrishnan's mother	Asianet	Malayalam	
2008	Alaipayuthey		Jaya TV	Tamil	
2008	Simran Thirai		Jaya TV	Tamil	Story : Anuvum Naanum
2008–2009	Thangamana Purushan	Lion Janaki	Kalaignar TV	Tamil	
2009	Sollathan Ninaikiren		Zee Tamil	Tamil	
2017–2021	Yaaradi Nee Mohini	Neelambari	Zee Tamil	Tamil	
2017–2018	Uyyala Jampala	Shantamma	Star Maa	Telugu	
2017	Muddha Mandaram		Zee Telugu	Telugu	
2018	Makkal	Saraswathi	Mazhavil Manorama	Malayalam	Replaced by Shobha Mohan
2018	Aranmanai Kili	Judge Kaveri	Star Vijay	Tamil	
2018	Genes	Guest	Zee Tamil	Tamil	One episode
2019	Bigg Boss Tamil 3	Contestant	Star Vijay	Tamil	Evicted on Day 14
2019	Bigg Boss 3 Kondattam	Herself	Star Vijay	Tamil	Special show
2021	BB Jodigal	Contestant	Star Vijay	Tamil	
2022	Sippikul Muthu	Suseela	Star Vijay	Tamil	
2023	Uppena	Visalakshi	Gemini TV	Telugu	
2024	Janaki Ramayya Gari Manavaralu	Janakamma	Zee Telugu	Telugu	
2025	Karthigai Deepam	Kaaliamma	Zee Tamil	Tamil	
2026	Parijatham	Poongothai	Zee Tamil	Tamil	Special Appearance
