= S Musics =

- Founded: 2007
- Founder: S. Shankar
- Genre: Film Soundtracks
- Country of origin: India
- Location: Chennai, Tamil Nadu

S Musics is an audio rights record owned by producer-director S. Shankar formed to release soundtracks and albums for Tamil films.

== Audio Released ==
Audio Released Year	Film	Cast	Director	Music director
2007	Kalloori	Tamanna, Akkil, Balamurugan, Hema, Rajeswari, Sailatha, Mayareddy, Arunkumar, Alex, Prakash	Balaji Sakthivel	Joshua Sridhar
2008	Arai En 305-il Kadavul	Prakash Raj, Santhanam, Ganja Karuppu	Chimbudevan	Vidyasagar

== See also ==
- S Shankar
- S Pictures
