= Samrajyam II: Son of Alexander =

- Theatrical release poster of Malayalam version
- Directed by: Perarasu
- Written by: Perarasu
- Produced by: Ajmal Hassan
- Starring: Unni Mukundan; Akanksha Puri; K.C.Shankar; Vijayaraghavan; Madhu; Rahul Menon; Devan; Manoj K. Jayan
- Cinematography: Sekhar V. Joseph
- Edited by: Samjith Muhammed
- Music by: R. A. Shafeer; Background Score: S. P. Venkatesh
- Production company: Gayathri Film International
- Distributed by: Central Pictures
- Release dates: 13 June 2015 (Malayalam); 21 August 2015 (Tamil)
- Running time: 160 minutes (Malayalam Version); 164 minutes (Tamil Version)
- Country: India
- Languages: Malayalam; Tamil
- Budget: ₹2 crore

Samrajyam II: Son of Alexander is a 2015 Indian Malayalam-language action film directed by Perarasu in his Malayalam debut. The film is produced by Ajmal Hassan. It is a sequel to 1990 Malayalam cult classic film Samrajyam. The film was partially reshot in Tamil as Tihar.

The film's songs were composed by R. A. Shafeer whilst the background score was composed by S. P. Venkatesh, with lyrics written by Sarath Vayalar, while Shekar V. Joseph handled the cinematography. The film was released on 13 June 2015.

== Cast ==
- Unni Mukundan as Jordan, Son of Alexander
- Akanksha Puri as Saira IPS
- K.C.Shankar as Vikram Das
- Madhu as Balakrishnan IPS (Retd. IG)
- Vijayaraghavan as Khadar
- Rahul Menon as John Peter IPS / Jordan, Son of Alexander (fake)
- Devan as Surya Das
- Riyaz Khan as Sanjay Das
- Manoj K. Jayan as Stephen Antony, CBI officer
- Kalashala Babu as Bomb Bhaskaran
- Suraj Venjaramoodu as Theeppori Thankappan
- Firose Khan as a police inspector
- Mammootty as Alexander (archival footages only)
- Captain Raju as Krishna Das (archival footages only)
- Perarasu cameo appearance in song "Megathin Meethada"

Tamil version

- Parthiban as Alexander
- Priyanka Thimmesh as Maha, Alexander's wife
- Jiya Irani as Krishna Das
- Kadhal Dhandapani as Bomb Bhaskaran
- M. S. Bhaskar as Theeppori Thankappan
- Pondy Ravi as Henchman
- Kottachi as Theeppori Thankappan's henchman

== Production ==
The film was produced by Ajmal Hassan. It was filmed in Spain, Australia, Dubai, England, Kochi, Chennai, Mumbai and Hyderabad. The film was released on 13 June 2015.

The film was partially reshot in Tamil as Tihar with Parthiban.

== Soundtrack ==
Music by R. A. Shafeer.

Malayalam version

- "Saghi Ninte Neela" – Sadhana Sargam, R. A. Shafeer
- "Meghathin Meethada" – Kumar Sanu, Lekha P.
- "Kettu Pottiye Pole" – Sunidhi Chauhan
- "Irutine Pootanai" – Shaan, Kushboo Jain

Tamil version

- "Ezhuvannam Pola" – Ranjini Jose
- "Methathai Meeruda" – Srikanth Deva, Krishnaveni Perarasu
- "Sathiradum Neela" – Sathya Prakash, Vinitha
- "Yarivan Yarivan" – Tippu

== Reception ==
Samrajyam 2 received highly negative reviews.

Malayalam version

Critics criticizing film by saying "this is the destruction of its first part". A critic from Indiaglitz stated that "Samrajyam 2 is nothing but a disaster". Jomon, the director of Samrajyam 1, highly criticized the film and said "Director Perarasu directed this cringe worthy sequel without watching it's prequel".

Tamil version

A critic from Nowrunning wrote that "Overall, Tihar is an utterly annoying action drama with endless number of poorly choreographed action sequences".
