= Thiruvannamalai (film) =

- Theatrical poster
- Directed by: Perarasu
- Written by: Perarasu
- Produced by: Pushpa Kandaswamy
- Starring: Arjun; Pooja Gandhi; P. Sai Kumar
- Cinematography: Padmesh
- Edited by: V. Jaishankar
- Music by: Srikanth Deva
- Production company: Kavithalayaa Productions
- Distributed by: Ayngaran International
- Release date: 19 December 2008
- Running time: 160 minutes
- Country: India
- Language: Tamil

Thiruvannamalai is a 2008 Indian Tamil-language action film written and directed by Perarasu. It stars Arjun in the main dual lead role, with Pooja Gandhi and P. Sai Kumar playing supporting roles. The music was composed by Srikanth Deva.

Thiruvannamalai was released on 19 December 2008. The film was a decent hit at the Tamil Nadu box office.

== Plot ==
Easwaran is an upright, honest youth who runs a local cable channel in Kumbakonam. He is known to fight for causes of the society and the common man. He falls in love with Malathi. He enters into fisticuffs with local MLA Poongundran after he exposes his corrupt and greedy ways through his cable TV channel. Fearing trouble, his mother Alamelu takes him to a saint in Thiruvannamalai. Guruji resembles Easwaran. A sequence of events forces them to swap places. The soft-spoken Swami tries to sort all issues through non-violent means (Gandhian philosophy). Halfway through, Duraisingam dies in the hands of Poongundran and Poovarasu. In the climax, Guruji kills Poongundran.

== Cast ==
- Arjun in a dual role as Easwaran and Guruji
- Pooja Gandhi as Malathi
- P. Sai Kumar as MLA Poongundran
- Karunas as Duraisingam
- Vidharth as Poovarasu, Poongundran's Younger brother
- Sudha as Eswaran's mother
- Akila as Easwaran's sister
- Vaiyapuri as Thumbi Singaram
- Chitti Babu as Poongundran's sidekick
- Saravana Subbiah as Police Inspector
- Pala. Karuppiah as Chief Minister
- Bharathi Kannan as Pandian
- Periyar Dasan
- Munnar Ramesh
- Vellai Subbaiah
- Kadugu Ramamoorthy
- Suja Varunee as Special appearance
- Perarasu as Dr. Swamy Malai (Cameo appearance)

== Production ==
Following the trend of his previous films, Perarasu named the film after a place in Tamil Nadu. While shooting, there was a difference of opinion between Perarasu and Arjun with the latter wanting to showcase himself as a mass hero similar to his older films while the former wanted to tone it down.

== Soundtrack ==
The music was composed by Srikanth Deva and was released by Divo. All lyrics were written by Perarasu.

Thiruvannamalai

Soundtrack album by Srikanth Deva
- Released: 2008
- Recorded: 2008
- Genre: Soundtrack
- Length: 24:34
- Labels: Ayngaran Music; An Ak Audio; Divo
- Producer: Srikanth Deva

Srikanth Deva chronology
Thenavattu (2008)	Thiruvannamalai (2008)	Perumal (2009)

Track list
No.	Title	Singer(s)	Length
1.	"Om Siva Siva"	Shankar Mahadevan	1:34
2.	"Namma Nadai"	Naveen	4:11
3.	"Adiyae"	Udit Narayan, Suchitra	4:44
4.	"Kaadai"	Magi, Renuka, Senthildass Velayutham	1:45
5.	"Amma Maare"	Surmukhi Raman, Pushpavanam Kuppusamy	4:14
6.	"Solla Solla"	Hariharan, Sadhana Sargam	4:23
7.	"Emmaiyaalum"	Shankar Mahadevan	3:43
Total length:			24:34

== Reception ==
Sify wrote: "The plodding plot by Perarasu is a rehash of so many films and is as stale as day before yesterday's Sambar! It follows the hoary formula of all mass masalas, and there is not even one scene or dialogue which is original". Pavithra Srinivasan of Rediff.com rated the film 1.5/5 stars and wrote, "Leave your brains at home and watch Thiruvannamalai".
