= Ganja Karuppu =

Indian film actor (born 5 January 1976)

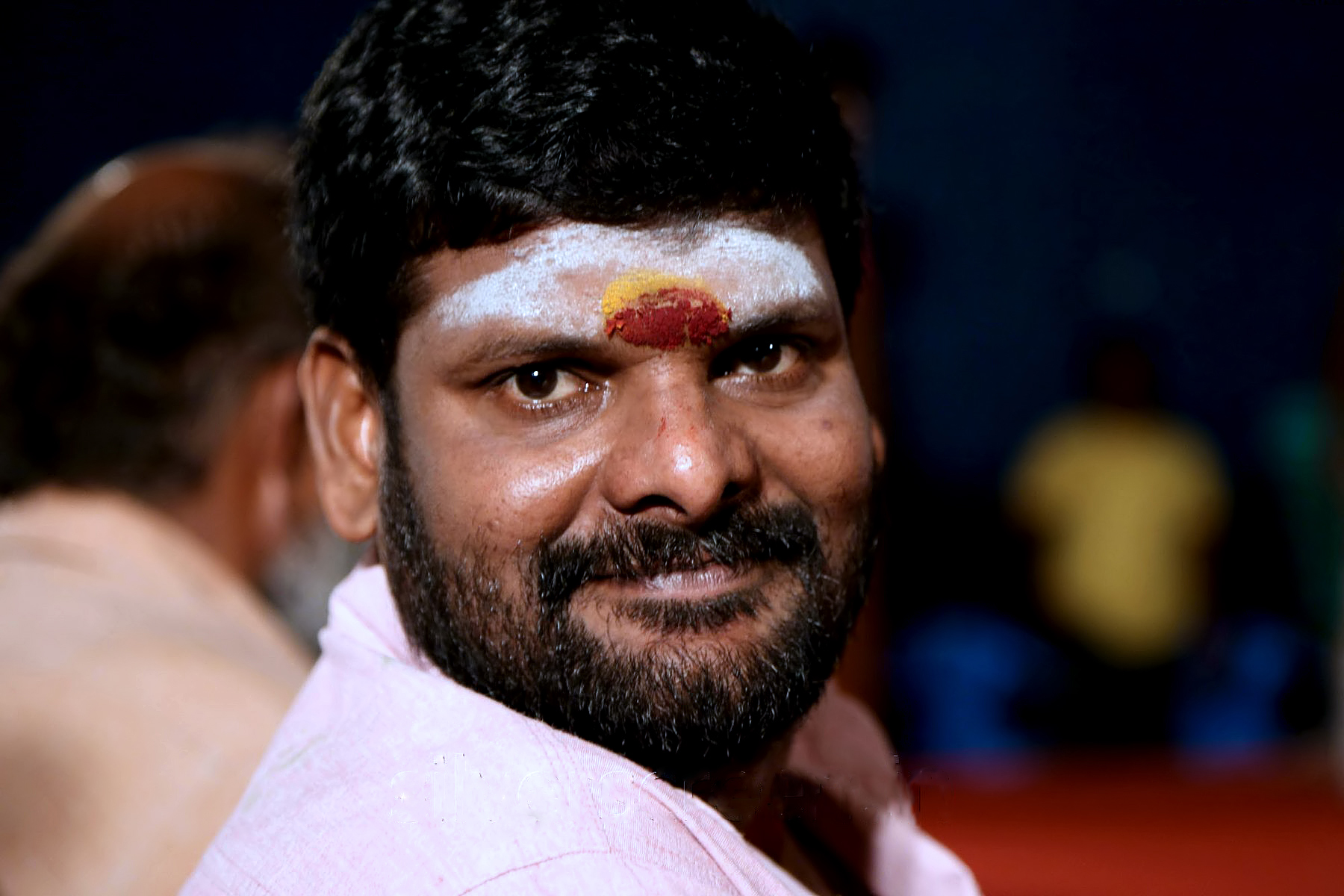
- Born: Karuppu Raja; 5 January 1976 (age 50); Nattarasankottai, Sivagangai, Tamil Nadu, India
- Occupation: Actor
- Years active: 2003–present

Karuppu Raja, known for his stage name Ganja Karuppu (born 5 January 1976), is an Indian actor who has predominantly appeared in comedy roles in Tamil cinema. After making his debut in Bala's Pithamagan (2003), Ganja Karuppu experienced success in the late 2000s with his roles in Raam (2005), Sivakasi (2005), Paruthiveeran (2007), Subramaniyapuram (2008) and Naadodigal (2009).

== Career ==
Karuppu was introduced as an actor by director Bala in Pithamagan (2003) as a person who works in the ganja plantations. As a result of the role, he was thereafter credited in films as Ganja Karuppu. In the 2000s, he subsequently was regularly cast in rural films by directors, working on notable films including Ameer's Raam (2005) and Paruthiveeran (2007), Sasikumar's Subramaniapuram (2008), Samuthirakani's Naadodigal (2009) and Sargunam's Kalavani (2010). During the period, he was also cast in the second lead role in Chimbudevan's Arai En 305-il Kadavul (2008) alongside Santhanam, produced by S Pictures. The period of success meant that he was cast in the lead role of a film titled Mannar Valaikuda by Dhanasekaran. Despite making progress, the film about the plight of the fishermen community did not have a theatrical release.

In 2012, Karuppu was set to enter Bollywood with a role in the Hindi remake of Samuthirakani's Poraali (2011), but the film eventually did not materialise. He had revealed that he would change his name to "Ganja Khan" for his stint in the Hindi film industry. Karuppu chose to turn film producer with Velmurugan Borewells (2014) but the film went through production delays and had a low profile theatrical release, losing him a significant amount of money. Director Bala later criticised Karuppu for unnecessarily putting his acting career in jeopardy with the move. Following a period away from notable films, Karuppu made a comeback with significant roles in S. J. Surya's as Isai (2015) and Dharma Durai (2016).

In 2017, he participated in the first season of the Tamil reality television show Bigg Boss hosted by Kamal Haasan. After regularly clashing with fellow actor Bharani, he was evicted on day 14.

== Personal life ==
He married Sangeetha, a physiotherapist, in January 2010 in a ceremony held in his home town of Nattarasankottai. His first son was born in April 2011 in Madurai. In 2013, he chose to adopt the expenses of five mentally ill people in Trichy. Later in 2016, he announced his intentions of becoming a politician.

== Awards ==
- Kalaimamani Award - 2006

== Filmography ==
Year	Film	Role	Notes
2003	Pithamagan	Ganja Kudukki	credited as Sivagangai Karuppu
2005	Raam	Vazhavandhaan	
2005	Thirudiya Idhayathai		credited as Karuppu Raja
2005	Chidambarathil Oru Appasamy		
2005	Sivakasi	Udayappa's sidekick	
2005	Bambara Kannaley		
2005	Sandakozhi	Balu's house servant	
2006	Kalvanin Kadhali	Karuppu	
2006	Thirupathi	Muthu	
2006	Kodambakkam		
2006	Unnakum Ennakum	Karuppiah	
2006	Aran	Ganja Karuppu	
2006	Sivappathigaram	Vellai	
2006	Kizhakku Kadarkarai Salai	Petrol Pump Employee	
2006	Aacharya	Kokki	
2007	Thaamirabharani	Muthu	
2007	Paruthiveeran	Douglas	
2007	Pirappu	Kotti	
2007	Adavadi		
2007	Madurai Veeran	Himself	
2007	Thirumagan		
2007	Pasupathi c/o Rasakkapalayam	Karuppu	
2007	Azhagiya Thamizh Magan	Kathiravan's assistant	
2007	Mirugam	Idi Thangi	
2007	Nenjirukkum Varai	Auto Driver	
2007	Pazhaniappa Kalloori		
2008	Pirivom Santhippom	Karuppu	
2008	Pidichirukku	Esakki	
2008	Vilaiyattu		
2008	Arai En 305-il Kadavul	Mokkai Swami	
2008	Inba	"Saavi" Shankar	
2008	Pandi	Thalaiathi	
2008	Subramaniapuram	Kaasi	
2008	Uliyin Osai	Soodamani	
2008	Thenavattu	Vellaiyan	
2008	Panchamirtham	Muthu	
2009	A Aa E Ee	Kicha	
2009	Kadhalna Summa Illai		
2009	Naadodigal	Maariyappan	
2009	Vaigai	Jeevarasi	
2009	Engal Aasan	Yogiyan	
2009	Malayan		
2009	Malai Malai	Karuppu	
2009	Aarupadai	Karuppu Raja	
2009	Aarumaname	Periyasamy, Chinnasamy	Dual roles
2009	Suriyan Satta Kalloori	Idithangi	
2009	Yogi	'Stills' Mani	
2009	Mathiya Chennai		
2009	Balam	Altap Arumugam	
2010	Maanja Velu	Bhooshan	
2010	Kathai		
2010	Aval Peyar Thamizharasi	Othappuli	
2010	Kutti Pisasu	Karuppu	
2010	Kattradhu Kalavu		
2010	Pen Singam		
2010	Kalavani	Panchayathu	
2010	Vamsam	Sombhu Mani	
2010	Sindhu Samaveli	Church father	
2010	Irandu Mugam		
2010	Ochayee	Azhagar	
2010	Aarvam	Tea master	
2010	Vallakottai	Veera Sangili	
2010	Magizchi	Rasappan	
2010	Siddu	Monnaiyan	
2011	Thambikottai	Karuppu	
2011	Sankarankovil	Killi Pillai	
2011	Venghai	Ganesan	
2011	Puli Vesham	Karuppu	
2011	Aayiram Vilakku	Tyson	
2011	Keezhatheru Kichaa		
2011	Thambi Vettothi Sundaram	Current	
2011	Konjam Sirippu Konjam Kobam		
2011	Poraali	Pulikutti	
2012	Medhai		
2012	Oru Nadigaiyin Vaakkumoolam	Arokkiyasamy	
2012	Soozhnilai		
2012	Kondaan Koduthaan	Pachamuthu	
2012	Mazhaikaalam		
2012	Sooriya Nagaram		
2012	Ooh La La La	Iron Shop	
2012	Mayanginen Thayanginen	Muthukumar's friend	
2012	Mirattal	Kathi	
2012	Mayilu		
2012	Kai	Puyal Perumal	
2012	Akilan		
2013	Naangaam Pirai		
2013	Vellachi		
2013	Keeripulla		
2013	Vetkathai Kettal Ennai Tharuvaai		
2013	Chikki Mukki	Paandi	
2013	Maiyam Konden		
2013	Thirumathi Thamizh		
2013	Orissa	Constable	Malayalam film
2013	Thiru Pugazh		
2013	Sokkali		
2013	Mouna Mazhai		
2013	Nugam		
2013	Muthu Nagaram		
2013	Chithirayil Nilachoru		
2013	Kolagalam		
2013	Sandhithathum Sindhithathum		
2014	Kovalanin Kadhali		
2014	Adhu Vera Idhu Vera		
2014	Amara		
2014	Kandharvan		
2014	Vetri Selvan		
2014	Thalakonam		
2014	Kalkandu	Azhappan	
2014	Appuchi Gramam		
2014	Velmurugan Borewells		
2015	Isai	Karuppu	
2015	Vethu Vettu	Attachi Appakadai worker	
2015	Paranjothi		
2015	Kangaroo	Kangaroo's friend	
2015	Lailaa O Lailaa	Auto driver	Malayalam film
2015	Maharani Kottai		
2015	Madhura Naranga	Sri Lankan Tamil tourist guide	Malayalam film
2016	Sowkarpettai		
2016	Sandikuthirai		
2016	Dharma Durai	Compounder	
2017	Unnai Thottu Kolla Vaa		
2017	Thondan	Xavier	
2017	Paakanum Pola Irukku	Choo Choo Maari	
2017	Ullam Ullavarai		
2017	Kurangu Bommai	Viji's brother	
2017	Kida Virundhu		
2017	Palli Paruvathile	Peon	
2017	Kalavadiya Pozhudugal	Gnanam	
2018	Nimir	Sadha's brother-in-law	
2018	Kannakkol		
2018	Kasu Mela Kasu		Cameo appearance
2018	Sandakozhi 2	Durai's servant	
2018	Bayangaramana Aalu		
2018	Piraanmalai		
2019	Dhevakottai Kadhal		
2019	Gilli Bambaram Goli		
2019	Thanimai		
2019	Kadhal Munnetra Kazhagam	Karmegham	
2019	Oviyavai Vitta Yaru		
2019	Vannakili Bharathi		
2019	Kalavani 2	Panchayathu	
2019	Vennila Kabaddi Kuzhu 2	Paandi	
2020	Irumbu Manithan	Munikannan	
2020	Kombu		
2022	Maamanithan	House Broker	
2022	Nokka Nokka		
2022	Manja Kuruvi		
2022	Aruvaa Sanda		
2023	En 6 Vaathiyaar Kaalpanthatta Kuzhu		
2023	Sri Sabari Ayyappan		
2025	Aandavan		
2025	Panai		
2025	Cristina Kathirvelan		

Television

Year	Title	Role	Platform	Notes
2017	Bigg Boss	Contestant	Star Vijay	Evicted Day 14
2025	Om Kali Jai Kali	Vakkeel	JioHotstar	Debut web series
2025 - present	Cooku with Comali - Season 6	Contestant	Star Vijay	Eliminated on episode 13
2026	Resort	Chef Chidambaram "Chika"	JioHotstar	
