= Thiruthani (film) =

- Theatrical release poster
- Directed by: Perarasu
- Written by: Perarasu
- Produced by: C. Baskar
- Starring: Bharath; Sunaina; Rajkiran
- Cinematography: K. Bala
- Edited by: V. Jaishankar
- Music by: Perarasu
- Production company: VK Media
- Release date: 19 October 2012
- Running time: 145 minutes
- Country: India
- Language: Tamil

Thiruthani is a 2012 Indian Tamil-language vigilante action film written and directed by Perarasu, who has also composed the soundtrack and original score. Marketed with the tagline, "Action Avatharam", the film stars Bharath and Sunaina in the lead roles, while Rajkiran, Pandiarajan and Ashish Vidyarthi play other pivotal roles. Kottachi and National Award winning actor Appukutty provide the much needed comic relief. The cinematography was handled by K. Bala and editing by V. Jaishankar. Thiruthani was released on 19 October 2012.

== Plot ==
Velu is a gym instructor who beats up men who cause trouble to his sister for celebrating Diwali. Duraipandi is an ex-military officer, who proudly watches the fight along with many others, but becomes furious when Velu refuses to save an athlete from having his leg broken, despite his pleas for help. It is here that Velu justifies his actions, saying that everyone stood watching as his unconscious mother was left locked up in a burning building for fear that they would be killed by the local goons. Later, Velu gets involved in an accident causing severe damages to his skull, where the doctor privately tells him that he would only live for another 6 months. Unable to bear the thought of his family being depressed upon his death, Velu becomes harsh with them, believing that this would make them hate him.

Seeing this, Duraipandi advises Velu to kill the local goons so that everyone can live peacefully and that he will not face prison term as he is about to die. Under the name of Thiruthani, Velu starts to kill the goons and soon becomes one of the most wanted criminals. Andiyappan is a corrupt minister who orders the police to kill Thiruthani in a police encounter. Shocked at this news, the doctor informs Thiruthani that he lied about his condition only because of Duraipandi's request. Enraged, Thiruthani advances on Duraipandi only to find out that the latter has lost one leg in the army. Thiruthani decides to surrender to the police, but is attacked by Andiyappan and his henchmen. A fight ensues where Thiruthani kills them and Duraipandi takes the blame for the murders where he gets shot by the police. In the aftermath, Velu continues his vigilantism against the goons under the pseudonym of Swami Malai.

== Cast ==
- Bharath as Velu/Thiruthani/Swami Malai
- Sunaina as Sugeesha
- Rajkiran as Duraipandi
- Pandiarajan as Mohanraj
- Ashish Vidyarthi as Andiyappan
- M. S. Baskar as Kannayiram
- L. Raja as Doctor
- Chitti Babu as Police officer
- Vinod Raj as Balu, Velu’s father
- Vellai Subbaiah as Iyer
- Appukutty as Velu's friend
- Kottachi as Velu's friend
- Anu Mohan as Aavi Andappan
- Suryakanth as Andiyappan’s henchman
- Nellai Siva as Orphanage worker
- O. A. K. Sundar as ACP Prakash
- Fathima Babu as Andiyappan’s wife
- Meena Kumari as Mohanraj's wife
- Pushpalatha as Velu’s mother
- Saira as Swetha
- Sugeesha Perarasu as Mohanraj's daughter
- Cheranraj as Henchman
- Rajendranath as Police commissioner
- Harish Ori as Andiyappan’s cousin
- Suresh Nair (Viswa) as Suresh
- Cool Suresh as Henchman
- Ganesh Babu as Swetha’s husband
- Anjali Devi as Orphanage worker
- M. J. Shriram as Doctor
- Thenali as Velu's friend
- Chinrasu as Velu's friend
- Kili Ramachandran as Velu's friend
- Usha Elizabeth as Geetha
- Perarasu as Ramalingam (cameo appearance)

== Soundtrack ==
The soundtrack is composed by Perarasu in his musical debut, and he also wrote the lyrics for all songs. The audio was released on 19 August at Kamala Theatre.

Musicperk wrote, "This one is an overall disappointing show by Perarasu although he shines in parts, the album fails to gel with today’s times. It does not provide anything refreshingly different and innovatively new for the GEN-Y of today. The tunes all seem like you have heard them somewhere before.

Track listing
No.	Title	Singer(s)	Length
1.	"Nee Enakku Nee Enakku"	Karthik, Saindhavi
2.	"Vaanavedikkai Vedidaa"	Tippu
3.	"Adi Vaanaville"	Unni Menon, Chinmayee
4.	"Yamma Yamma"	T. Rajender, Anuradha Sriram
5.	"Vannarapettai"	Tippu, Krishnaveni Perarasu
6.	"Raja Raja Chozha"	Suchitra

== Release and reception ==
The film was released on 19 October 2012. The Times of India gave 2 out of 5 stars and wrote "Perarasu manages to give us quite a powerful film, by making sparks fly out of electrical machinery whenever and wherever possible. In these power-strapped times, this is indeed a more fanciful sight than the foreign locations we get to see in the listless songs". Malini Mannath of The New Indian Express wrote, "The film is not as loud and as melodramatic as the director's earlier ventures. In fact with slight alterations, it would have been an ideal script for a mass hero like Vijay".
