= Thirupaachi =

2005 film by Perarasu

- Theatrical release poster
- Directed by: Perarasu
- Written by: Perarasu
- Produced by: R. B. Choudary
- Starring: Vijay; Trisha; Mallika
- Cinematography: S. Saravanan
- Edited by: V. Jaishankar
- Music by: Dhina; Devi Sri Prasad (1 song); Mani Sharma (1 song)
- Production company: Super Good Films
- Release date: 14 January 2005
- Running time: 178 minutes
- Country: India
- Language: Tamil

Thirupaachi is a 2005 Indian Tamil-language action drama film written and directed by Perarasu (in his directorial debut) and produced by R. B. Choudary under Super Good Films. The film stars Vijay in the main lead role alongside Trisha and Mallika, while J. Livingston, Pasupathy, Benjamin, Kota Srinivasa Rao, Vaiyapuri and Manoj K. Jayan play supporting roles. The music was composed by Dhina, who jointly composed one song each with Devi Sri Prasad and Mani Sharma. The cinematography and editing were handled by S. Saravanan and V. Jaishankar.

Thirupaachi was released on 14 January 2005, and was one of the most successful Tamil films of the year. It was remade in Kannada as Thangigagi and in Telugu as Annavaram.

== Plot ==
Sivagiri alias Giri, a bladesmith in a remote village near Thirupaachi, has a lovable sister Karpagam and runs into hilarious incidents while searching for a groom for his sister. When a city guy proposes to Karpagam, Giri accepts their relationship. Giri accompanies the newlyweds to Chennai. On a trip to Chennai, Giri rescues a court witness from Pattasu Balu, a gangster dominating Central Chennai. Giri also learns about Pan Parag Ravi, a local gangster dominating North Chennai and also responsible for troubling Karpagam's husband's canteen business.

During an altercation at a theatre, Kannappan gets murdered by Saniyan Sagadai, a gangster dominating South Chennai. Karpagam's husband tells Giri to leave Chennai for his sister to be happy. After Kannapan's funeral, Giri leaves his hometown and says that he received a job at a cloth manufacturing company in Erode. However, Giri is still in Chennai with intentions to finish all gangsters. Giri calls Sagadai and states that he will kill him. Giri also calls ACP Raj Guru and says that he will eradicate the city's gangsters. Inspector Veluchamy, Giri's friend, initially refuses Giri's methods, but later helps Giri in the mission after his son Arun gets killed by Balu.

Veluchamy provides a list of the city's entire crime network to Giri by providing the specifications of leading gangsters in various areas. Giri writes their names and soon kills Balu. Later, Giri provokes Ravi to kill his brother and Ravi hides in a politician's house to escape from Giri. Ravi damages the politician's house and vehicles to make the police believe that someone has attacked his house. The police decide to provide security for the politician. Through Veluchamy, Giri learns that Ravi is hiding in the politician's house. He brings a group of people, who rally due to losing their money to a fraudulent financier hiding in the politician's place.

With the rally, Giri enters Ravi's fort and kills him. Raj inquires about the people involved in the rally regarding the identity of Giri, but nobody wants to inform anything because they think Giri is doing the right thing. Raj's daughter does not reveal Giri's identity as Giri rescued her from Balu earlier. Later, Giri sets out to kill Sagadai and warns him. Sagadai seeks the protection of a mass group of thugs from the city. Giri uses this as an opportunity to destroy the city's crime network. Giri ignites a war between the police and gangsters in a very diplomatic manner. Giri disguises himself as a cop and enters Sagadai's fort. Veluchamy helps Giri in his mission by injuring himself and Raj orders his squad to hit the thugs.

Giri confronts a thug and forces him to wear a police uniform, where he kills the thug and throws him out of the window. Thinking that one of his fellow officers is dead, Raj and the cops kill all the thugs, but they discover Giri's plan and run upstairs to find him. Giri stabs Sagadai and throws him to the ground right before the New Year, thus avenging Kannappan's death. In the aftermath, Giri reunites with his girlfriend Subha, Karpagam, and her husband.

== Cast ==
- Vijay as Sivagiri alias Giri
- Trisha as Subha
- Mallika as Karpagam
- Livingston as Inspector Inba Raghavan
- Pasupathy as Pattasu Balu
- Kota Srinivasa Rao as Saniyan Sagadai
- Manoj K. Jayan as ACP Raj Guru
- Benjamin as Kannappan
- Yugendran as Inspector Veluchamy
- Aryan as Pan Parag Ravi
- Vaiyapuri as a constable
- Vijayan as Commissioner Rathnakumar
- Vinod Raj as Sivagiri and Karpagam's father
- Rajya Lakshmi as Sivagiri and Karpagam's mother
- M. N. Rajam as Subha's grandmother
- Nellai Siva as a villager
- M. S. Bhaskar as a marriage broker
- Sashikumar Subramani as Ravi's brother
- Meenal as Raj's daughter
- Kumarimuthu as Kannappan's father
- Fathima Babu as Raj's wife
- Karate Raja as Balu's henchman
- Sampath Ram as Balu's henchman
- Theni Kunjarammal as Sivagiri's and Karpagam's grandmother
- Bharathi as Saniyan Sagadai's wife
- Vellai Subbaiah
- Periya Karuppu Thevar
- Scissor Manohar
- Bala Singh
- Meesai Rajendranath
- Cool Suresh as a goon (uncredited)
- Chaya Singh in a special appearance in the song "Kumbida Pona Deivam"

== Production ==
Thirupaachi marked the directorial debut of Perarasu. The film was initially titled Girivalam. Despite planning to shoot in Thirupachi, a village near Madurai–Ramanathapuram border, Perarasu opted against shooting there, feeling it may create traffic problems; instead the village portions were shot in Karaikudi. A set resembling Aiyanar temple with a 90-foot statue, surrounded by 200 mud horse costing about ₹3 million, was designed by M. Prabhakar in a village in Siravayal near Tiruppattur, Sivaganga. A song was shot with about 1,500 junior artistes in that set and took a week to complete the song. The climax was shot in Vasan House, Chennai, where a huge crowd of junior artistes taking part each day of the two weeks to complete the scene. Other filming locations were Visakhapatnam, Arakkuveli and South Africa.

== Soundtrack ==
The soundtrack has seven songs, five songs were composed by Dhina, while Devi Sri Prasad ("Kattu Kattu") and Mani Sharma ("Kannum Kannumthan") had composed one song respectively. For the song "Kattu Kattu", Devi Sri Prasad reused the music from the song "Pattu Pattu", which he produced from Shankar Dada M.B.B.S. For the song "Kannum Kannumthan", the latter had reused music from the song "Chitti Nadumune", which he produced for the Telugu film Gudumba Shankar. The lyrics for all the songs were penned by Perarasu.

Song	Singer(s)	Length	Composer
"Kattu Kattu"	Manikka Vinayagam, Sumangali	5:12	Devi Sri Prasad
"Kannum Kannumthan"	Harish Raghavendra, Uma Ramanan, Premji Amaren	5:56	Mani Sharma
"Appan Panna"	Pushpavanam Kuppusamy, Anuradha Sriram	4:48	Dhina
"Nee Entha Ooru"	Tippu	4:48	Dhina
"Kumbida Pona Deivam"	Shankar Mahadevan, Malathy Lakshman	4:12	Dhina
"Enna Thavam"	Dhina, Swarnalatha	2:15	Dhina
"Avichu Vecha"	Manikka Vinayagam	1:11	Dhina

== Release ==
Thirupaachi was released with on 14 January 2005, coinciding with Pongal, with over 207 prints, the highest for a Vijay film to that point. It opened against Ayya, Iyer IPS, Aayudham and Devathaiyai Kanden. Despite the heavy competition, Thirupachi became a success, with the same director and lead actor reuniting for Sivakasi, released later the same year.

== Reception ==
=== Critical response ===
Malini Mannath of Chennai Online wrote "Perarasu tries to make slight variations within the parameters of this scenario, weaving in the right dose of humour, action and sentiment and succeeds in presenting a film that is fast-paced and engaging from the opening to the final scene." Sify wrote, "Vijay has stuck to his regular formula – five songs, flying fights, crass comedy, punchline dialogues, dream songs in foreign locales and corny sentiments. So if you have seen earlier films of the superstar you may strive hard to find anything new in Thirupaachi, which is old wine served in a new bottle, with a different label. Ananda Vikatan rated the film 40 out of 100.

Visual Dasan of Kalki called Thirupaachi not only the angry brother, but also the masala king. Cinesouth wrote, "Perrarasu have written story, screenplay, dialogue, songs and also directed the movie. It seems he wanted to convey the message that “Chennai is not just a capital city alone, if it remains calm, the whole Tamilnadu will remain in peace”. But his understanding of violence seems to be limited to the Aruwal wielding Rowdies who wears half- a kilo gold ornaments on their persons, is the first flaw of the movie. The one and only plus point in the screenplay, is that, it manages to create an expectation among the audience that, whenever the villains are indulging in atrocities, Vijay will definitely raise up in anger to smash them all." G. Ulaganathan of Deccan Herald called it "A disappointing fare from producer R B Choudhry".

=== Box office ===
Thirupaachi opened to packed houses with 80 per cent occupancy from Chennai and other districts of the state. After taking a fantastic opening for the first week, the film took a slight fall in crowd for the second week.

== Accolades ==
Thirupaachi won the Tamil Nadu State Film Award for Best Actor-Special Prize (Vijay).

== Controversy ==
After the release of Thirupaachi, Super Good Films were sued by Godrej Sara Lee Ltd. for "defamatory, prejudicial, offensive and slanderous" use of the mosquito spray HIT which they are the trademark owners of. Godrej eventually won the case and obtained an "order of permanent injunction and damages" worth ₹500,000 from Super Good Films.

== Remakes ==
The film was remade in Kannada as Thangigagi (2006) and in Telugu as Annavaram (2006).
