= M. J. Shriram =

Tamil singer and actor

- Born: 5 February 1969 (age 57)
- Occupations: Actor, playback singer
- Years active: 1998–present
- Spouse: Srilekha Parthasarathy

M. J. Shriram is an Indian actor and playback singer, who has worked on Tamil-language films. He is best known for his songs in Pachchak Kuthira (2006) and his role in Sivakasi (2005).

== Career ==
Shiram began singing when he was five-years-old. His talent enabled him to share the stage with Kamal Haasan at a concert in Singapore in 1993. He played a small role in Sollamale (1998) before playing Vijay's friend in the film, Sivakasi (2005), which is considered his acting debut. He made his singing debut in Parthiban's Pachchak Kuthira (2006).

== Filmography ==
=== Actor ===
Films

Year	Film	Role	Notes
1998	Sollamale	Advertising agency owner	
2005	Sivakasi	Muthappa's friend	
2006	Thalainagaram	Police Officer	
2008	Pazhani	Naina	
2011	Vithagan		
2012	Thiruthani	Doctor	
2013	Puthagam	Newsreader	
2014	Aaha Kalyanam	Ramesh	
2014	Velaiilla Pattadhari	Ramkumar	
2015	Vellaiya Irukiravan Poi Solla Maatan	Pradeep Kumar	
2017	Velaiilla Pattadhari 2	Ramkumar	
2017	Brahma.com	Parameshwaran	
2018	Sarkar	Sundar's uncle	
2020	Pattas	Politician	
2020	Vaanam Kottattum	George	
2020	Naanga Romba Busy	Karthik's father	
2022	Iravin Nizhal	Rowther	
2022	Poikkal Kudhirai	Shivasubramaniam	Uncredited role
2022	Coffee with Kadhal	Diya's father	
2023	Joe	Shruthi's father	
2023	Saba Nayagan	Esha's father	
2024	Guardian	Dr. Rudhran	
2025	Mr. Housekeeping	Isai's father	
2025	Test	Meiyappan	
2025	Dude	Doctor	
2025	Revolver Rita	Prabhakar	
2025	Bad Girl	Ramya's Father	
2026	Pookie	Aazhi's father	
2026	Nee Forever		

=== Television ===
Year	Series	Role	Channel	Notes
2004	Krishna Cottage	Bablu	Jaya TV	
2014–2018	Thamarai	Gajendran	Sun TV	
2017–2019	Raja Rani	Chandrashekar	Star Vijay	
2018	Sa Re Ga Ma Pa Lil Champs	Judge	Zee Tamil	
2019–2020	Tamil Selvi	Rajarajan	Sun TV	
2019–2020	Bharathi Kanamma	Venba's uncle	Star Vijay	
2020–2021	Uyire		Colors Tamil	
2021	Vadham	Anandhan	MX Player	
2021–2022	Namma Veetu Ponnu	Dr. Chezhiyan	Star Vijay	
2022	Kana Kaanum Kaalangal		Star Vijay	Special appearance
2023	Sweet Kaaram Coffee	Karthik's father	Amazon Prime Video	

=== Singer ===
Year	Film	Song
2006	Pachchak Kuthira	"Pottu Vechi"
2006	Pachchak Kuthira	"Pachaya Pachaya"
2006	Pachchak Kuthira	"Adadadi Ganja Chedi"
2008	Mudhal Mudhal Mudhal Varai	"Kondadum"
2016	Kannula Kaasa Kattappa	"Dhuddu Thandhaane"
2016	Kannula Kaasa Kattappa	"Mannasukule"
