= Chitti Babu (Tamil actor) =

Indian actor

- Chitti Babu
- Born: Sajjadh Adeebh; 10 January 1964; Chennai, Tamil Nadu
- Died: 8 November 2013 (aged 49); Chennai, Tamil Nadu
- Occupations: Actor, comedian
- Years active: 2002–2013
- Spouse: Zareena
- Children: 2

Chitti Babu (Tamil: சிட்டி பாபு; a.k.a. Sajjiah Adeebh, 10 January 1964 – 8 November 2013) was an Indian Tamil comedian, presenter and actor who prominently played supporting roles in Tamil cinema. He was also one of the judges in the comedy show Asathapovathu Yaaru on Sun TV.

== Personal life ==
Chitti was born on 10 January 1964. He was married to Zareena Jabeen and had two daughters, Rizwanah Adeebh and Rifah Adeebh, and a son, Riaz Adeebh. He died on 8 November 2013 at the age of 49, after going into a diabetic coma.

== Filmography ==
Year	Movie	Role	Notes
2002	Five Star	Train TTR	
2003	Galatta Ganapathy	Veerappan	
2003	Ottran	Marriage Broker	
2003	Boys		
2003	Dhool	Minister's PA	
2003	Paarai		
2004	Thendral	PT Master	
2004	Jairam		
2004	Sema Ragalai		
2004	Varnajalam		
2005	Sivakasi	Mamoi	
2005	Ayodhya	Akbar	
2005	Sorry Enaku Kalyanamayidichu	Murali	
2006	Ilakkanam	Kumaresan	
2006	Kusthi		
2006	Perarasu		
2006	Varalaru	Police Inspector	
2007	Sivi		
2008	Pazhani	Durga's Security	
2008	Adada Enna Azhagu	Security guard	
2008	Iyakkam	Appusamy	
2008	Kuruvi	Koccha's assistant	
2008	Pandi	Police Inspector	
2008	Dasavathaaram	Ekambaram	
2008	Ayyavazhi		
2008	Sakkarakatti		
2008	Dindigul Sarathy		
2008	Thiruvannamalai	Poongundran's sidekick	
2009	Kadhalna Summa Illai		
2009	Laadam	SI Gabriel	
2011	Mappillai	Rajeshwari's PA	
2011	Pillaiyar Theru Kadaisi Veedu	Doctor	
2011	Uyarthiru 420		Cameo appearance
2012	Ooh La La La		
2012	Thiruthani		
2013	Sokkaali		
2013	Masani	Minor	
2014	Aranmanai	Temple in charge	Posthumous release
2015	Inji Murappa	Boss	Posthumous release
2025	Madha Gaja Raja	Viswanathan's PA	Posthumous release

== Television ==
- Hari Giri Assembly (Jaya TV)
- Mr. Thenali Raman (Sun TV (India))
- Comedy Time (Sun TV)
- Asathapovathu Yaaru (Sun TV)
- Pondatti Thevai (Sun TV) – Kovilmani
