= Samrajyam =

- Poster designed by Gayathri Ashokan
- Directed by: Jomon
- Screenplay by: Shibu Chakravarthy
- Story by: Jacob Jomon K.J
- Produced by: D. Ajmal Hassan
- Starring: Mammootty; Madhu; Captain Raju; Vijayaraghavan
- Cinematography: Jayanan Vincent
- Edited by: K. P. Hariharaputhran
- Music by: Ilaiyaraaja
- Production company: Arifa Productions
- Distributed by: Shyni Films Release
- Release date: 22 June 1990 (Kerala)
- Running time: 122 minutes
- Country: India
- Language: Malayalam

Samrajyam (transl. Empire) is a 1990 Indian Malayalam-language gangster film directed by Jomon. The film stars Mammootty as Alexander, a powerful underworld don. It narrates the story of his rise and fall in the criminal world. The supporting cast includes Madhu, Captain Raju, Ashokan, Vijayaraghavan and Srividya.

During the making of 1921 (1988), Mammootty and Jomon, who was then working as an assistant director, discussed a story idea developed by Jomon based on organised crime and the mafia. Impressed by the concept, Mammootty encouraged Jomon to expand it into a full-fledged script. He later introduced Jomon to Shibu Chakravarthy on the sets of No.20 Madras Mail (1990), and the two developed the screenplay over several brainstorming sessions. The film features no songs, only a background score composed by Ilaiyaraaja, while cinematography was handled by Jaynan Vincent.

Samrajyam was released on 22 June 1990 to positive reviews and became a commercial success, running in theatres for 25 weeks. The dubbed Telugu version was released in Andhra Pradesh, where it achieved significant success. Initially distributed with about ten prints, it later expanded to around 400 prints due to strong demand from theatres.

A sequel titled Samrajyam II: Son of Alexander, starring Unni Mukundan, was released in 2015.

== Premise ==
Alexander, a powerful mafia leader, faces numerous challenges as he attempts to maintain control over the underworld while dealing with his strained relationship with his mother, who had abandoned him earlier in life.

== Cast ==
- Mammootty as Alexander (Vinu)
- Madhu as IG Balakrishnan, IPS
- Captain Raju as Krishna Das
- Ashokan as Anil Das, Krisha Das' son
- Vijayaraghavan as Khadir
- Srividya as Lakshmi
- Sonia as Alexander's sister
- Sathaar as Mathews
- Jagannatha Varma as K. M. Shah
- Sadiq as James
- C. I. Paul as Fr. Isaac Zachariah
- Balan K. Nair as Chandy
- Prathapachandran as Chief Minister
- Jagannathan as Ganeshan, Lakshmi's father
- Bheeman Raghu as Tony, a goon
- Ponnambalam as Krishna Das's henchman
- Vishnukanth as Alexander's son
- Thapasya as Annie, Alexander's wife

== Production ==
=== Development ===
In an interview with Mathrubhumi in 2020, Jomon spoke about how he developed the story for Samrajyam. He said that he had always wanted to make a film about organised crime and the mafia, inspired by real-life incidents that had fascinated him since childhood.

Jomon began his career as an associate director under I. V. Sasi in the late 1980s and worked as the sixth assistant director on 1921 (1988). During shooting breaks, he narrated a story idea to Mammootty, who was impressed and encouraged him to develop it further. Jomon later shared the story with Mammootty and Joshiy on the sets of Mahayanam (1989), and Joshiy found the concept "interesting", advising him to turn it into a full-fledged script.

Jomon recalled, "After that, I started writing the script while staying at a lodge in Madras. A month later, when Mammooka arrived at the Woodlands Hotel in Madras, I met him with the completed script."

After reading the script in one sitting, Mammootty felt that it needed a more experienced screenwriter and introduced Jomon to Dennis Joseph. However, Joseph was occupied with other projects and suggested his assistant, Shibu Chakravarthy, who was also a lyricist, to work on the script. Chakravarthy had previously collaborated on the screenplays of Mammootty starrers such as Manu Uncle (1988) and Adharvam (1989), both written by Dennis Joseph. Jomon stated that he and Chakravarthy developed the screenplay through "several brainstorming sessions."

Once the script was finalised, Jomon began searching for a producer to finance the project. During his time in Chennai, he had worked with Arifa Hassan of Arifa Enterprises on several films as an assistant director. According to Jomon, Hassan had recently faced several box-office failures and was in a "state of despair." When Mammootty learned that Hassan would be producing the film, he was initially hesitant, as the two had fallen out after their previous collaboration, Thadaakam (1982). However, Jomon insisted on Hassan producing the film, and Mammootty eventually agreed after about one and a half years.

=== Post-production ===
Jayabharathi's house in Chennai and the Thiruvananthapuram airport served as the film's primary shooting locations. Jayanan Vincent, who had previously worked with Jomon on several projects, was the cinematographer. The initial scenes filmed featured Madhu and Srividya, with Mammootty joining the shoot a week later. According to Jomon, Mammootty frequently called Madhu to check on the progress of the production.

Principal photography was completed in 28 days on a budget of ₹6.5 million.

The film did not feature any songs, relying solely on a background score. Ilaiyaraaja was Jomon's first choice for composer, though he was one of the busiest in South India at the time. Jomon and Hassan met Ilaiyaraaja at Prasad Studios in Chennai to discuss the project. After meeting them, Ilaiyaraaja expressed interest, watched the film the following day, and, impressed by it, postponed work on a Sivaji Productions venture to begin composing for Samrajyam immediately.

== Release ==
=== Reception ===
The film received positive reviews from critics, with particular praise for its direction and technical aspects.

=== Box office ===
The film performed moderately well in Kerala, but achieved significant commercial success in Andhra Pradesh.

The film ran for over 400 days at several theatres in Andhra Pradesh and remains one of the longest-running Malayalam films in the state. It completed 50 days in 25 centres and 100 days in 9 centres across Andhra Pradesh, earning a final share of ₹80 million. In Kerala, it opened with record-breaking initial collections and completed a silver jubilee run in major centres.

== Sequel ==
Samrajyam II: Son of Alexander, starring Unni Mukundan in the lead role, was released in 2015. The film marked the Malayalam debut of Tamil director Perarasu. Set twenty-five years after the events of the original, the sequel follows the story of Alexander's son.
