= Panchamirtham =

- Directed by: Raju Eswaran
- Written by: Raju Eswaran; L. Ganapathy (dialogue)
- Produced by: Abhirami Ramanathan
- Starring: Jayaram; Prakash Raj; Raju Eswaran; Nassar; Aravind Akash; Saranya Mohan; Samiksha
- Cinematography: Pramod Verma
- Edited by: Mu. Kasi Viswanathan
- Music by: Sundar C Babu
- Production company: Abirami Mega Mall
- Release date: 25 December 2008
- Country: India
- Language: Tamil

Panchamirtham is 2008 Indian Tamil-language fantasy comedy film scripted and directed by Raju Eswaran, it stars Jayaram, Prakash Raj and the director himself alongside an ensemble supporting cast including Nassar, Aravind Akash, Saranya Mohan, Samiksha, Karunas, and Ganja Karuppu. Produced by Abhirami Ramanathan and with music by Sundar C Babu, the film released on Christmas (25 December) 2008.

== Plot ==
The story begins at Ravanan's (Prakash Raj) abode and the time of Ramayana when he orders his uncle Mareesan (Jayaram) to transform into a deer to abduct Seetha (Regina Cassandra). Mareesan argues with Ravana but finally complies since Idumba (Raju Eswaran) and Ravana threaten the life of Mareesan's lover Mandahini (Samiksha). Finally, the said thing happens, and Mareesan gets struck by the arrow by lord Rama. He becomes a rock, but not before he transforms Idumba into an anklet and wears it on his leg. Times change, and the modern day comes. Rajaram (Nassar) is a very rich man who owns tea estates. He has Seetha (Saranya Mohan) as his dietitian and Sri Rama (Aravind Akash) as his cook. Both Rama and Seetha are in love. On the other hand, Rajaram's relatives (Thirupathi (M. S. Bhaskar) and Mayilsamy) plan a plot to take the property. In this process, they end up planning to kill Seetha by pushing her from a mountaintop. Seetha falls directly on the rock idol of Mareesan and gets his human form. At the same time, his anklet falls off and gets eaten by a fish. That fish is caught by fisherman Manickam (Nassar), and Idumba gets his human form. The age old enmity crops up, and while Mareesan vows to protect Seetha, Idumba plans to help Manickam get Rajaram's property as half brother. What happens from there forms the rest of the story..

== Cast ==
- Jayaram as Mareesan
- Prakash Raj as Ravanan
- Raju Eswaran as Idumban
- Nassar as Rajaram and Manickam (dual role)
- Aravind Akash as Sriram
- Saranya Mohan as Seetha
- Samiksha as Mandahini
- Karunas as Pandi
- Ganja Karuppu as Muthu
- M. S. Bhaskar as Thirupathi
- Mayilsamy as Rajaram's relative
- Ilavarasu as Kasi
- Manobala as Doctor
- Lollu Sabha Soundarya as Pappi
- Gowthami Vembunathan as Thirupathi's wife
- Regina Cassandra as Seetha

== Production ==
Abirami Ramanathan, who previously worked as a film exhibitor and distributor, forayed into production through this film.

== Soundtrack ==
The soundtrack was composed by Sundar C. Babu, and lyrics for all songs were written by Vaali.

Panchamirtham

Soundtrack album by Sundar C. Babu
- Released: 13 December 2008
- Genre: Feature film soundtrack
- Language: Tamil
- Producer: Sundar C. Babu

Sundar C. Babu chronology
Anjathe (2008)	Panchamirtham (2008)	Naadodigal (2009)

- "Panchamirtham"— M. S. Viswanathan
- "Thandana Thandana" — Shreya Ghoshal
- "Nadhikkarai Oram" — Madhu Balakrishnan, K. S. Chithra
- "Kadhal Vandhal" — Karthik, Rita
- "Uchathula Aandavan" — Naveen Madhav

== Critical reception ==
Pavithra Srinivasan of Rediff.com rated the film 2.5/5 stars and wrote: "Even if it isn't as funny or classy as they had promised, the team does deliver some laughs".
