= S Pictures =

Film production company

- Type: Film production Film distribution
- Industry: Entertainment; Motion picture
- Founded: 1999
- Founder: S. Shankar
- Headquarters: Chennai, Tamil Nadu, India
- Products: Films
- Owner: S. Shankar

S Pictures is a film production company managed by film director S. Shankar.

== Filmography ==
=== Films produced ===
Title	Year	Director	Cast	Ref.
Mudhalvan	1999	S. Shankar	Arjun, Manisha Koirala, Raghuvaran	
Kaadhal	2004	Balaji Sakthivel	Bharath, Sandhya, Dhandapani	
Imsai Arasan 23rd Pulikecei	2006	Chimbu Deven	Vadivelu, Monica, Tejashree, Nassar	
Veyil	2006	Vasanthabalan	Bharath, Pasupathy, Bhavana, Priyanka Nair, Sriya Reddy	
Kalloori	2007	Balaji Sakthivel	Tamannaah, Akhil, Hemalatha	
Arai En 305-il Kadavul	2008	Chimbu Deven	Prakash Raj, Santhanam, Ganja Karuppu, Madhumitha, Jyothirmayi	
Eeram	2009	Arivazhagan Venkatachalam	Aadhi, Nandha, Sindhu Menon, Saranya Mohan	
Rettaisuzhi	2010	Thamira	K. Balachander, Bharathiraja, Aari, Anjali	
Anandhapurathu Veedu	2010	Naga	Nandha, Chaya Singh, Aaryan Balaji	

=== Films distributed ===
In addition to the films produced by S Pictures since 1999, the following films from other banners were distributed by the company:

- Prajapathi (2006)
- Kappal (2014)
- Aneethi (2023)

== See also ==
- S. Shankar
- S Musics
