= Pazhani (2008 film) =

- Theatrical release poster
- Directed by: Perarasu
- Written by: Perarasu
- Produced by: Sakthi Chidambaram
- Starring: Bharath; Kajal Aggarwal; Khushbu
- Cinematography: Vijay Milton
- Edited by: V. Jayshankar
- Music by: Srikanth Deva
- Production company: Cinema Paradise
- Release date: 15 January 2008
- Running time: 154 minutes
- Country: India
- Language: Tamil

Pazhani is a 2008 Indian Tamil-language masala film written and directed by Perarasu. Marketed as "Commercial Panchamirtham", it stars Bharath in the main lead role alongside Kajal Aggarwal and Khushbu. The film, produced by Sakthi Chidambaram under the banner Cinema Paradise, had music by Srikanth Deva. This is Bharath's first action film with a kola mass image makeover and is also the first Tamil film release for Aggarwal, as her Tamil debut film Bommalattam (also 2008) got delayed.

Pazhani launched on 10 August 2007 and was released on 15 January 2008 which coincided with the Pongal festival, and emerged as Pongal winner.

== Plot ==
Pazhanivel (Pazhani) is released from jail after 15 years and accidentally saves Jeevanandham from some goons, following which he gets appointed as Jeevanandham's car driver. Karpagambal is Jeevanandham's wife and also Pazhani's sister, which he learns later. Pazhani hides his identity from Karpagambal and reveals his name as Vellaiyan, as she has a hatred towards her brother from childhood. Meanwhile, Pazhani falls in love with Deepti. Pazhani suddenly finds out that Jeevanandham has a money minded concubine named Durga.

Karpagambal finds out that Pazhani is her brother and gets furious. She also gets him sacked. Now, Karpagambal finds out the real truth about her brother. A flashback is shown where Karpagambal and Pazhanivel's father, Meiyappan, had a concubine and Pazhani killed her at the age of 10. He is then arrested and jailed for the well-being of his mother. As Karapagambal was unaware of the reason behind the murder, she developed a hatred towards Pazhani right from childhood. Knowing the truth, Karpagambal understands Pazhani and she tells him not to come to her husband's house and see her again.

However, Jeevanandham has other plans now. He decides to divorce Karpagambal and marry Durga legally. Pazhani challenges Jeevanandham and tries all means to save Karpagambal. Jeevanandham stages a foul play along with Vaikundan, an unscrupulous moneylender. Everyone believes that Vaikundan confiscated Jeevanandham's house, following which Karpagambal is sent out of the house, but Pazhani arrives and takes Karpagambal along with him. Vaikundan cheats Jeevanandham and takes away his home for real, which shocks Jeevanandham.

Pazhani plays tricks and makes Karpagambal as the owner of the export firm owned by Jeevanandham, as the business is registered in the name of Karpagambal. Jeevanandham is left penniless, and to his surprise, Durga ditches him and joins hands with Vaikundan. Jeevanandham realises his mistake. Finally, Pazhani kills both Vaikundan and Durga in a fight. Pazhani is arrested for the murders and goes to jail. Pazhani feels happy that at first he landed up in jail for the well-being of his mother, and now he is jailed for the well-being of his sister.

== Cast ==
- Bharath as Pazhanivel "Pazhani" (Vellaiyan)
- Kajal Aggarwal as Deepti, Pazhani's love interest
- Khushbu as Karpagambal, Pazhanivel's elder sister
- Biju Menon as Jeevanandham, Karpagambal's husband
- Aishwarya as Durga, Jeevanandham's concubine
- Raj Kapoor as Vaikundan
- Yaar Kannan as Meiyappan, Pazhanivel's father
- Rekha as Poovathal, Pazhanivel's mother
- Ravi Mariya as Ekadasi
- Chitti Babu as Pazhani's jail friend
- Balu Anand as Jail Warden
- C. R. Saraswathi as Deepti's mother
- Anu Mohan as Jagadish
- M. S. Bhaskar as Burja Bhaskar
- Alex as Arivu
- M. J. Shriram as Naina
- Bava Lakshmanan as Watchman
- Bobby as Inspector Kanniappan
- Priyanka as Deepti's sister
- Velmurugan as Groom
- Kovai Babu as Groom
- Vellai Subbaiah
- Swamidev
- Kadugu Ramamoorthy
- Suja Varunee as an item number in the song, "Lokku Lokku"
- Perarasu as Thiruthani (director)

== Production ==
It was announced in 2007 that Bharath would collaborate with Perarasu. The film was launched at AVM Studios at 10 June 2007. The film's plot was primarily set and shot in Chennai; however the flashback was shot at Palani. The climax fight was shot at a factory at Ennoor for nine days.

== Soundtrack ==
The soundtrack was composed by Srikanth Deva and released on 8 November 2007. All lyrics were written by the film's storymaker and director Perarasu, who also sang the song "Lokku Lokku".

Track listing
No.	Title	Singer(s)	Length
1.	"Ellam Valla Iraiva"	Tippu	5:08
2.	"Yaarum Ennidam"	Karthik, Sadhana Sargam	4:38
3.	"Thiruvaroor Therae"	Udit Narayan, Anuradha Sriram	5:16
4.	"Innoru Murai"	Vasundhara Das, Naveen	4:27
5.	"Thaayai Polathaan"	Mukesh Mohamed	5:24
6.	"Locku Locku"	Perarasu, Suchitra	4:45
Total length:			29:38

== Release and reception ==
The film was released in Pongal 2008 alongside other Tamil releases like Bheemaa, Pirivom Santhippom, Kaalai, Vaazhthugal and Pidichirukku. Revathi of Kalki praised the acting of Bharath and Kushboo, Vijay Milton's cinematography but felt flashback was not strong enough; however she called sudden turns for avoiding boredom. Malini Mannath of Chennai Online wrote "With an insipid script, scenes that have no logical continuity, sense or sensibility; confused narration, and the waste of talented actors, 'Pazhani' turns out to be a total fiasco".
