= M. S. Bhaskar =

Indian actor

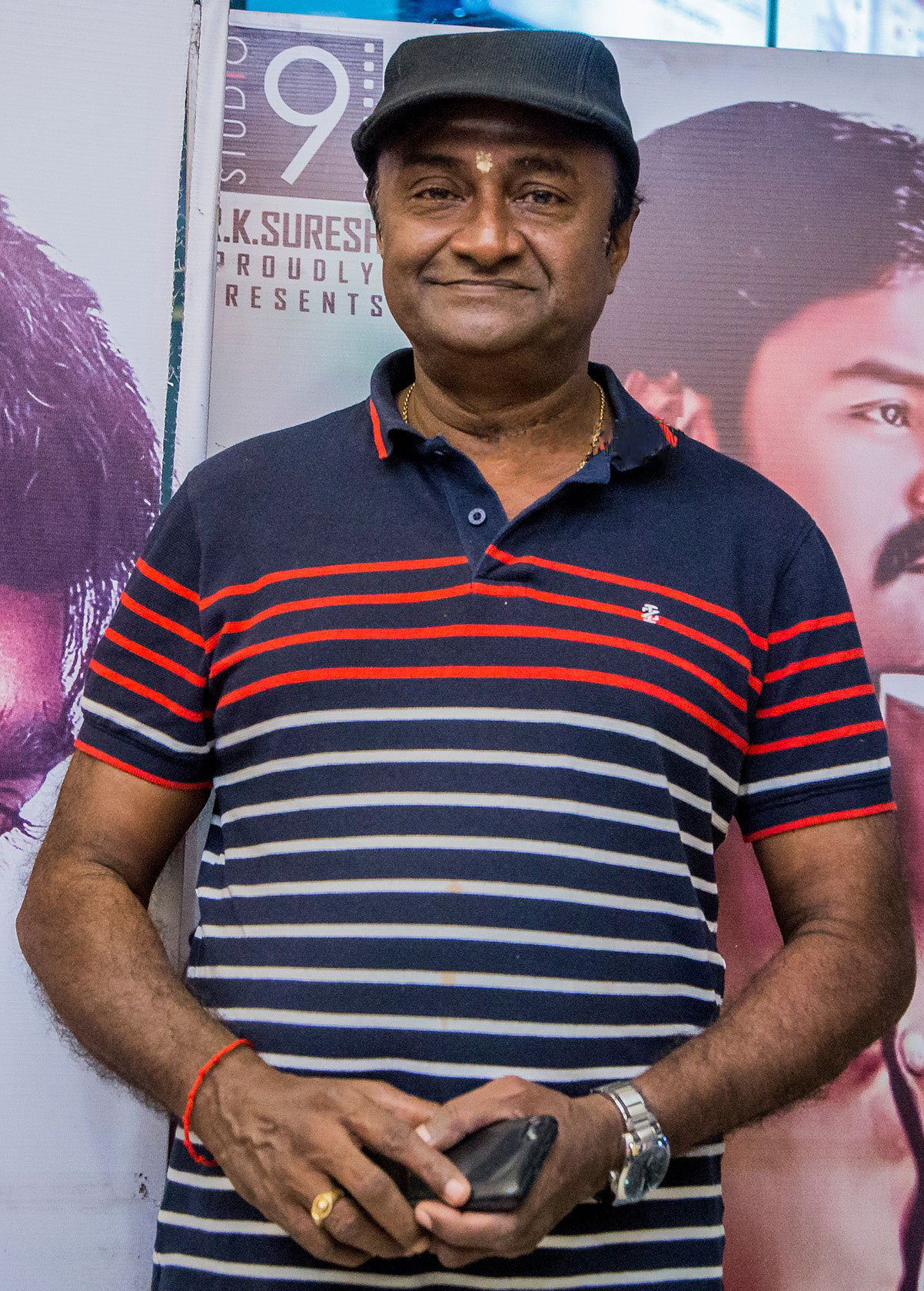
- Bhaskar at Dharma Durai Success Meet
- Born: Muthupettai Somu Bhaskar; 13 September 1957 (age 69); Thiruvarur, Madras State (now Tamil Nadu), India
- Occupations: Actor, Dubbing artist
- Years active: 1987–present
- Spouse: Shila
- Children: 2

Muthupettai Somu Bhaskar (born 13 September 1957) is an Indian actor and dubbing artiste who appears in Tamil films. An theatre artist, debuted in the film Thirumathi Oru Vegumathi (1987), and did several minor roles in the 1990s and got his major breakthrough in Engal Anna (2004). He is known to be one of the finest character artists in Tamil cinema.

In addition to acting, Bhaskar is an occasional playback singer as well. He is best known for his performances in the series Chinna Papa Periya Papa (2000), Selvi (2005) and Arasi (2007).

He won the Tamil Nadu State Film Award for Best Character Artiste for Mozhi (2007), the SIIMA Award for the Best Actor in a Supporting Role for 8 Thottakkal (2017), the Ananda Vikatan Cinema Award for Best Villain as well as National Film Award for Best Actor in a Supporting Role for his performance in Parking (2023).

== Career ==
Bhaskar, who hails from Muthupettai, near Pattukkottai was born and brought up in Nagapattinam. He was a part of a Tamil drama troupe 'Society for New Drama' which performed modern theatrical plays in Tamil Nadu. To supplement his income, Bhaskar also worked as an LIC agent for a brief period. Bhaskar acted in a number of other troupes including Nungambakkam Boys Kondatum and also worked in All India Radio and Doordarshan. Before acting, he worked in a toothpaste company.

During this period, Bhaskar began as a dubbing artist especially for dubbing Telugu films into Tamil where he spoke the comedian's lines. He also dubs English language films into Tamil for Sun TV.

When the dramatic society ended in 1992, Bhaskar began working in tele-serials on DD1 and DD2 including Nam Kudumbam and Vizhudugal, before he played roles in Ganga Yamuna Saraswati and in 1999 teleserial Mayavi Marichan which also starred Thadi Balaji in the lead role. He then landed a role in the comedy series Chinna Papa Periya Papa, in which he played the role of a and brother-in-law and in Senior Junior, Selvi and Arasi.

Bhaskar made his film début in 1987, enacting a small role in the film Thirumathi Oru Vegumathi. This was followed by several films in the 1990s, in which he appeared in very minor or small roles. He then appeared in supporting roles for the films Engal Anna (2004), Sivakasi (2005), Dharmapuri (2006), Mozhi (2007), Sivaji: The Boss (2007), Sadhu Miranda (2008), Santosh Subramaniam (2008), Dasavathaaram (2008) and 8 Thottakkal (2017). For his role in director Radha Mohan's Mozhi, he won him his Tamil Nadu State Film Award for Best Character Artiste (Male). In the movie Malaysia to Amnesia (2021), he collaborated with Radha Mohan for the seventh time. M. S. Bhaskar, whose outing here proves yet again that he is a multi-purpose actor with an ability to pull off comedy easily. In 2023, Bhaskar delivered a resounding performance in Parking. He won Ananda Vikatan Cinema Award for Best Villain. Later, Bhaskar received the Best Supporting Actor at the National Film Awards for this film.

== Personal life ==
His elder sister Hemamalini is also a dubbing artist. His daughter Ishwarya is a dubbing artist in the Tamil film industry for leading actresses. His son Aadithya Bhaskar is also an actor and made his debut portraying younger version of Vijay Sethupathi's character in 96 (2018).

== Filmography ==
Key
†	Denotes films that have not yet been released

=== Tamil films ===
List of Tamil film acting credits
Year	Title	Role	Notes
1987	Thirumathi Oru Vegumathi	Krishnan's college classmate	
1987	Makkal En Pakkam		
1987	Kavalan Avan Kovalan	Villager	
1989	Annanukku Jai		
1990	Salem Vishnu	Professor	
1990	Vedikkai En Vadikkai	Man who doubts his baby	
1991	Gnana Paravai		
1992	Kaaval Geetham	Purse snatcher	
1992	Mudhal Kural		
2001	Dumm Dumm Dumm	Doctor	
2001	Kottai Mariamman	Traffic policeman	
2002	Kannathil Muthamittal	Shankaralingam	
2002	Thamizhan	Conductor Ganesan	
2002	Ivan	Meena Kumari's father	
2002	Jjunction	Sivalingam	
2002	University		
2002	Mutham	Maya	
2003	Military	Muthu	
2003	Anbe Anbe	Ramya's father	
2003	Aahaa Ethanai Azhagu		
2003	Ilasu Pudhusu Ravusu	Deepak's father	
2003	Ragasiyamai		
2004	Engal Anna	Mani	
2004	Machi		
2004	Azhagiya Theeye	Annachi	
2004	Gajendra		
2004	Bose	Vedimuthu	
2004	Neranja Manasu	Nariyan	
2004	Attahasam	Sex Doctor	
2005	Thirupaachi	Tharakar	
2005	Sukran	Comic Inspector	
2005	Kana Kandaen	Minister	
2005	Amudhey	Dudu	
2005	Neeye Nijam	Watchman	
2005	Chinna		
2005	Sivakasi	'Vakkeel' Venky	
2005	Sorry Enaku Kalyanamayidichu	Azhagusundaram	
2006	Idhaya Thirudan		
2006	Azhagai Irukkirai Bayamai Irukkirathu	Manager	
2006	Thirupathi	P.A. Brahma	
2006	Kedi	Raghu's father	
2006	Ilavattam	Teacher	
2006	Dharmapuri	Shanmugam	
2006	Varalaru	Mental	
2007	Veerasamy	Advocate	
2007	Mozhi	Gnanaprakasam	Tamil Nadu State Film Award for Best Character Artiste (Male)
2007	Sivaji: The Boss	P.S to chief secretary	
2007	Kireedam	Constable	
2007	Thirutham	Punniyakodi	
2007	Azhagiya Tamil Magan	Coach	
2007	Machakaaran	Police constable	
2008	Pazhani		
2008	Pirivom Santhippom	Aarumugam	
2008	Sadhu Miranda	Moneylender	
2008	Anjathe	Loganathan	
2008	Velli Thirai	Ram Gopal Sharma	
2008	Santosh Subramaniam	Kooththa Perumal (Sarukku Maram)	
2008	Arai En 305-il Kadavul	Sottaikaruvaapaya Kutti Madasaamy	
2008	Iyakkam	Muthukutty	
2008	Azhaipithazh	Project manager	
2008	Dasavathaaram	Broadway Kumar	
2008	Sutta Pazham	Kumaraswamy	
2008	Kuselan	Kuppusamy's assistant	
2008	Dhanam		
2008	Saroja		
2008	Theeyavan	Velu	
2008	Dindigul Sarathy	Kavignar Kaakkaakarayaan	
2008	Panchamirtham	Thirupathi	
2009	Kadhalna Summa Illai		
2009	Innoruvan	Vaali	
2009	Naalai Namadhe	DGP Pullaiah	
2009	Guru En Aalu	Gopal	
2009	Thoranai	Tamizharasan's assistant	
2009	Manjal Veiyil		
2009	Maasilamani	'Coma' Ramaswamy	
2009	Sirithal Rasipen	Boopathy Pandian	
2009	Eesa	Duraisamy	
2009	Unnaipol Oruvan	Pankajaksha	Bilingual film
2009	Suriyan Satta Kalloori	Saama Iyer	
2010	Tamizh Padam	Nakul	
2010	Veerasekaran		
2010	Irumbukkottai Murattu Singam	Aathrikesa	
2010	Kola Kolaya Mundhirika	Santhanam	
2010	Madrasapattinam	Vengayappan	
2010	Irandu Mugam		
2011	Kaavalan	Sakkaran	
2011	Payanam	Rev. Fr. Alphonse	Bilingual film
2011	Thambikottai	Valayapatti	
2011	Eththan	Swami	
2011	Deiva Thirumagal	Murthy	
2011	Markandeyan		
2011	Puli Vesham	Senthil	
2011	Velayudham	Vaidehi's father	
2012	Oththa Veedu		
2012	Konjum Mainakkale		
2012	Krishnaveni Panjaalai		
2012	Thaandavam	Thambi Mama	
2012	Thiruthani	Kannayiram	
2012	Pudhumugangal Thevai		
2013	Chandhamama	Krishnamoorthy	
2013	Karuppampatti	Don Stanlee	
2013	Soodhu Kavvum	Gnanodayam	
2013	Nagaraja Cholan MA, MLA	Kootha Perumal	
2013	Thee Kulikkum Pachai Maram		
2013	Idharkuthane Aasaipattai Balakumara	Poochandi	
2013	Ragalaipuram	Vincent	
2013	Sutta Kadhai	Ottagam	
2013	All in All Azhagu Raja	Dhillaana Divyanathan	
2014	Ner Ethir	Neeraavi	
2014	Ninaithathu Yaaro	Special appearance	
2014	Ninaivil Nindraval		
2014	Kadhal Solla Aasai	Anjali's father	
2014	Oru Kanniyum Moonu Kalavaanikalum		
2014	Arima Nambi	S. I. Arumugam	
2014	Aindhaam Thalaimurai Sidha Vaidhiya Sigamani		
2014	Nee Naan Nizhal	Thambi	
2014	Aaaah	Guru	
2014	Mosakutty	Malayali	
2014	13 aam Pakkam Paarkka		
2014	Azhagiya Pandipuram	Pambukutty	
2014	Vellaikaara Durai	Tanjore Mahadevan	
2015	Ivanuku Thannila Gandam	Ponvandu	
2015	Vai Raja Vai	Karthik's uncle	
2015	Uttama Villain	Chokku Chettiar	
2015	India Pakistan	Marudhamuthu	
2015	36 Vayadhinile	Stephen	
2015	Demonte Colony	Saaminadhan	
2015	Vindhai	Tamizh Aayndha Nallon	
2015	Tihar	Theeppori Thankappan	
2015	Kaaval	Gunasekharan	
2015	Moone Moonu Varthai	Raaman	Bilingual film
2015	Papanasam	Sulaiman Baai	
2015	Aavi Kumar	Very Good Sivasu	
2015	Savaale Samaali	Elango	
2015	Yatchan		
2015	Apoorva Mahaan		
2015	Uppu Karuvaadu	Neithal Jayaraman	
2015	Thanga Magan	Prakash Kumar's assistant	
2016	Bangalore Naatkal	Kannan's father	
2016	Saagasam	Sadhanandham	
2016	Nayyapudai	Satyamurthy	
2016	Natpadhigaram 79	Maha's father	
2016	Narathan	Bhaskar	
2016	Unnodu Ka	Master	
2016	Ka Ka Ka Po	Kimute (Egyptian god)	
2016	Vellikizhamai 13am Thethi	Saravanan's friend	
2016	Dharma Durai	Paraman	
2016	Kagitha Kappal	Ranagupta	
2016	Meen Kuzhambum Mann Paanaiyum	Don	
2016	Kadavul Irukaan Kumaru	Michael Aasirvadham	
2016	Kannula Kaasa Kattappa	Chinnapaiyan	
2016	Manal Kayiru 2	Josiyar	
2017	Yaakkai	Kathir's father	
2017	Vaigai Express	King Kesavan	
2017	8 Thottakkal	Krishnnamoorthy	SIIMA Award for the Best Actor in a Supporting Role
2017	Brindavanam	Louis	
2017	7 Naatkal	Bhaskar	
2017	Maragadha Naanayam	Pandurangan	
2017	Peechankai	Thamizhmagan	
2017	Sathura Adi 3500	John Peter	
2017	Pannam Pathinonnum Seyum	Kaalimuthu	
2017	Ippadai Vellum	Dr. S. Thillairajan	
2017	Guru Uchaththula Irukkaru	Uthaman	
2017	Indrajith	Salim	
2017	Thiruttu Payale 2		
2017	12-12-1950	Kumudhavalli's father	
2018	Nimir	Sadha	
2018	Keni		
2018	Sometimes	Raghavan	
2018	Semma Botha Aagathey	Kunjunni	
2018	Kalari	Maari	
2018	NOTA	Bhai	
2018	Kaatrin Mozhi	Neelakandan	
2018	Pattinapakkam	Thee Thangavel	
2018	Utharavu Maharaja	Ravi's father	
2018	Thuppakki Munai	Uyya	
2019	Thirumanam	Arunachalam	
2019	Agni Devi	Manimaran	
2019	Kuppathu Raja	Oor Niyayam	
2019	Ayogya	Venkatraman	
2019	A1	Saravanan's father	
2019	Kazhugu 2	Maari	
2019	Bakrid	Veterinarian	Guest appearance
2020	Oh My Kadavule	Anu's father	
2020	Kutty Devathai		
2020	Putham Pudhu Kaalai	Grandfather	
2021	Maara	Usmaan Bhai	
2021	Sulthan	Advocate	
2021	Vanakkam Da Mappilei	Councillor Puniyakotti	
2021	Malaysia to Amnesia	Mannargudi Narayanan	
2021	Iruvar Ullam	Karthik's uncle	
2021	Friendship	Advocate Chanakyan	
2021	Pei Mama	Sabapathy	
2021	Jai Bhim	Advocate Sankaran	
2021	Sabhaapathy	Ganapathy	
2021	Plan Panni Pannanum	Captain Kandhasamy / Vazhukkai Kandhasamy (VKS)	
2021	Madurai Manikuravaran	Mani's uncle	
2022	Etharkkum Thunindhavan	Karuppaiya	
2022	Taanakkaran	Sellakkanu	
2022	Battery	Pugazh's Grandfather	
2022	Kanam	Cab driver	
2023	Kodai	Gnanam	
2023	Kuttram Purinthal	Jeeva's uncle	
2023	Erumbu	Arumugam	
2023	Lockdown Diarie		
2023	Red Sandalwood		
2023	The Road	Subramani	
2023	Parking	Ilamparuthi	Ananda Vikatan Cinema Award for Best Villain; National Film Award for Best Supporting Actor
2023	Paatti Sollai Thattathe	Sakthi's father	
2023	Mathimaran	Sundaram	
2024	Vadakkupatti Ramasamy	Munusamy	
2024	Veppam Kulir Mazhai	Thiri Ayya	
2024	Boomer Uncle		Special appearance
2024	Double Tuckerr	Brammanantham	
2024	Oru Thavaru Seidhal	Parameshwaran	
2024	Oru Nodi	Sekaran	
2024	Akkaran	Veerapaandi	
2024	Saamaniyan	Mookaiah	
2024	Boat	Muthiah	
2024	Demonte Colony 2	Saaminadhan	Reused footage from first movie
2024	Raghu Thatha	Raghothaman	
2024	Brother	Dr. Phoenix Pushparaja	
2024	Meiyazhagan	Jallikattu commentator	Cameo appearance
2024	Jolly O Gymkhana	Commissioner Kodangi I.P.S	
2024	Emakku Thozhil Romance	Doctor	
2024	Soodhu Kavvum 2	Gnanodayam	
2025	Dinasari	Pazhaniyappan	
2025	Sabdham	Casket Maker	
2025	Tourist Family	Richard	
2025	Paramasivan Fathima	Church Father Oswald	
2025	Desiya Thalaivar		
2026	Hot Spot 2 Much	Monologue	Anthology film; Segment: "Dear Fan"
2026	Kadhal Reset Repeat	Paal Manickam	
2026	TN 2026	General Secretary	Also playback singer for "Vaadaa Thondaa"
2026	Kara	Ageing villager	
2026	Pyaar Prema Kalyanam	Rajasekar	
2026	Singgaramm		

=== Other language films ===
List of other language film acting credits
Year	Title	Role	Language	Notes
2009	Eenadu	Complainant	Telugu	Bilingual films
2011	Gaganam	Rev. Fr. Alphonse	Telugu	Bilingual films
2015	Moodu Mukkallo Cheppalante	Rama Rao	Telugu	Bilingual films
2018	Kayamkulam Kochunni	Mothalali	Malayalam	
2020	Aswathama	Manoj's grandfather	Telugu	

=== Television ===
- 1991 Nam Kudumbam
- 1991 Vizhudugal
- 1992 Mayavi Marichan
- 1996 Kaiyalavu Manasu
- 1997 Premi
- 1990s Senior Junior
- 2000-2001 Anandha Bhavan as Narasimhan
- 2001-2002 Vazhndu Kattukiren as Lalaji Seth
- 2000 Ganga Yamuna Saraswati
- 2000-2006 Chinna Papa Periya Papa as Pattabi
- 2000-2001 Vaazhkai as Zinda
- 2001-2003 Alaigal as Mouli
- 2004 Enakkul Oruthi
- 2005-2006 Selvi as Aandavar Lingam
- 2007 Arasi as Aandavar Lingam

Web series

- 2018 America Mappillai (cameo)

=== Dubbing artist ===
Partial Filmography

Year	Title	Actor	Character	Notes
1981	Sattam Oru Iruttarai		3rd Villain	
1990	Vaaliban	Brahmanandam		Tamil dubbed version
1991	Seetha Geetha		Vijayakumar's PA	
1991	Uruvam	Veerapandiyan		
1991	Gnana Paravai	Raghuram		
1991	Apoorva Shakthi 369	Chandra Mohan, Brahmanandam		Tamil dubbed versions
1991	Coolie No. 1	Brahmanandam		Tamil dubbed versions
1992	Pokkiri Ponnu	Brahmanandam		Tamil dubbed versions
1992	Mouna Mozhi		Chandru's friend	
1993	Galatta Mappillai	Brahmanandam		Tamil dubbed versions
1993	Mayandi IPS	Jagathy Sreekumar		Tamil dubbed versions
1993	Mechanic Mappillai	Brahmanandam		Tamil dubbed versions
1993	Aranmanai Kadhali	Jagathy Sreekumar		Tamil dubbed versions
1994	Chinna Durai Periya Durai	Dharmavarapu Subramanyam		Tamil dubbed versions
1994	Manidha Manidha	Brahmanandam		Tamil dubbed versions
1994	Mr Maharani	Brahmanandam		Tamil dubbed versions
1994	Anbalayam	Ajit Vachani		Tamil dubbed versions
1994	The Shawshank Redemption	Morgan Freeman	Ellis Boyd "Red" Redding	Tamil dubbed versions
1994	Commissioner		Constable Babu and election commissioner	Tamil dubbed versions
1995	Jurassic Park	Martin Ferrero	Donald Gennaro	Tamil dubbed versions
1995	Bad Boys	Martin Lawrence	Detective Sergeant Marcus Burnett	Tamil dubbed versions
1995	Chutti Kuzhandai	Brahmanandam		Tamil dubbed versions
1995	Jiththan	Ali		Tamil dubbed versions
1995	Rowdy Boss	Brahmanandam		Tamil dubbed versions
1995	Mr. Deva	Ravi Vallathol		Tamil dubbed versions
1995	Ellame En Kaadhali	Brahmanandam		Tamil dubbed versions
1995	Raanuvam	Jagadish		Tamil dubbed versions
1996	Delhi Durbar	M. G. Soman		Tamil dubbed versions
1996	Nakkeeran	A. V. S.		Tamil dubbed versions
1996	Tamizh Selvan		Chief Minister's P.A.	
1996	Miss Madras	Brahmanandam		Tamil dubbed versions
1997	Yelam	Maniyan Pilla Raju		Tamil dubbed versions
1998	Nilave Unakkaga	Kalabhavan Mani		Tamil dubbed versions
1998	Ganesh	Brahmanandam		Tamil dubbed versions
1998	Autokaaran	Brahmanandam		Tamil dubbed versions
1998	Muradan	Brahmanandam		Tamil dubbed versions
1999	Kaadhal Vennila	Brahmanandam		Tamil dubbed versions
1999	Mannavaru Chinnavaru		Shivaji Ganesan's PA	Tamil partially reshot version
1999	Kaaki Sattaiya Karuppu Sattaiya	Sundar Raj		Tamil dubbed versions
1999	No. 1 Police	M. S. Narayana		Tamil dubbed versions
1999	Ganesh	Brahmanandam		Tamil dubbed versions
1999	Kudumba Sangili		DSP	
1999	Sethu	Nair Raman	Abitha's father	
2001	Nandhaa		Saravanan	
2001	Murari	M. S. Narayana		Tamil dubbed version
2001	Aandan Adimai		Sathyaraj's father	
2001	Narasimha	N. F. Varghese	Periya Thamburan Vasudevan	
2001	Kadhal Galatta	Brahmanandam	Hotel Server	Tamil dubbed version
2001	Kaadhal Sugamanadhu	Venu Madhav		Tamil partially reshot version
2002	Spider-Man	J.K. Simmons	J. Jonah Jameson	Tamil dubbed version
2002	Mounam Pesiyadhe	Duraipandiyan	Mahalakshmi's father	
2002	Gounder Veettu Mappillai	Jagathy Sreekumar		Tamil dubbed version
2003	Thiruda Thirudi	S. V. Thangaraj	Apartment president	
2003	Kalam	Kalabhavan Mani		Tamil dubbed versions
2003	Bad Boys II	Martin Lawrence	Detective Sergeant Marcus Burnett	Tamil dubbed versions
2004	Spider-Man 2	J.K. Simmons	J. Jonah Jameson	Tamil dubbed versions
2004	Kamaraj	Richard Madhuram	Kamaraj	
2005	Unleashed	Bob Hoskins	Bart	Tamil dubbed versions
2007	Spider-Man 3	J.K. Simmons	J. Jonah Jameson	Tamil dubbed versions
2007	Inimey Nangathan		Vichu	
2008	Satyam	Brahmanandam, Tanikella Bharani		
2008	Saroja	Brahmanandam	Car passenger	
2010	Eesan	Blessy	Karuppasamy	
2011	Sri Rama Rajyam	Brahmanandam		Tamil dubbed versions
2012	Ragalai	Brahmanandam		Tamil dubbed versions
2012	Yaarukku Theriyum	Achyuth Kumar		
2013	Ethir Neechal	Sharath Lohitashwa	Valli's father	
2014	Lingaa	Brahmanandam		
2015	Massu Engira Masilamani	Brahmanandam		
2015	Inji Iduppazhagi	Brahmanandam		
2015	Puli	Ali		
2017	Payanathin Mozhi	Nedumudi Venu		Tamil dubbed version
2019	Rocky: The Revenge	Brahmanandam		
2019	Lisaa	Brahmanandam		
2019	Asuran		Various characters	
2020	Dagaalty	Brahmanandam		
2020	Silence		Kalyana Sundaram	
2022	Adade Sundara	Naresh		Tamil dubbed version
2022	Dejavu	Achyuth Kumar		
2022	Sita Ramam	Ananth Babu		Tamil dubbed versions
2023	Kushi	Brahmanandam, Ali		Tamil dubbed versions

Serials

Year	Title	Actor	Character
1998	Marmadesam - Sorna Regai	R. Sundaramoorthy	Theatre owner
1999	Micro Thodargal-Plastic Vizhuthugal	Pandiyan	
2001	Balachander-in Chinnathirai - Ilakkanam Marumo		Nirosha's boss and Prathap pothan's car driver
2001	Kaveri		Kaveri's father

As narrator

- Ambuttu Imbuttu Embuttu (2005)
