= Dharmapuri (film) =

- Theatrical release poster
- Directed by: Perarasu
- Written by: Perarasu
- Produced by: A. M. Rathnam
- Starring: Vijayakanth; Raai Laxmi
- Cinematography: S. Saravanan
- Music by: Srikanth Deva
- Production company: Sri Surya Movies
- Release date: 21 October 2006
- Running time: 146 minutes
- Country: India
- Language: Tamil

Dharmapuri is a 2006 Indian Tamil-language action drama film written and directed by Perarasu and produced by A. M. Rathnam. It stars Vijayakanth and Raai Laxmi, while Manivannan, Raj Kapoor, Bobby, Vijayakumar, and M. S. Bhaskar play supporting roles. The songs were composed by Srikanth Deva. Dharmapuri was released on 20 October 2006.

== Plot ==
The film is set in a remote village in Tamil Nadu, Dharmapuri, known for making dolls from clay. It is the livelihood of people in the village. A man named Mokkaiyan, along with his sons Silandhi Karuppu and Peruchali Karuppu, grabs the land and gives it on a lease for a local MLA Konda Mookan. Humiliated and agitated, the villagers decide to put an end to their shenanigans. They set off in search of Sivaraman, the son of Meiyappan, who once strived for the welfare of the village and later was forced to flee the village due to Mokkaiyan's family. They finally spot Sivaraman in Rameshwaram, where he works tirelessly for the uplift of the people. They convince him to return to the village and teach Mokkaiyan and his family a lesson. Enters Sivaraman on a mission. He comes across Valarmathi and falls in love with her. Meanwhile, he also embarks on a mission to teach the baddies a lesson.

== Cast ==
- Vijayakanth as Sivaraman
- Raai Laxmi as Valarmathi
- Vijayakumar as Meiyappan, Sivaraman's father
- Rajesh as Valarmathi's father
- Manivannan as Mokkaiyan
- Raj Kapoor as Silandhi Karuppu
- Bobby as Peruchali Karuppu
- M. S. Bhaskar as Shanmugam
- Jaya Prakash Reddy as MLA Konda Mookan
- Manobala as Silandhi Karuppu's henchman
- Sumithra as Maragatham, Sivaraman's mother
- Manochithra as Valarmathi's mother
- Anu Mohan as Villager
- Periya Karuppu Thevar as Villager
- Bava Lakshmanan as Peruchali Karuppu's henchman
- Peeli Sivam as School teacher
- Theni Kunjarammal as Kunjarammal
- Bosskey
- Rajendranath as Police inspector
- Venba as Young Valarmathi
- Ramji in a special appearance in the song "Vandha Vaadi"
- Nanditha Jennifer in a special appearance in the song "Vandha Vaadi"
- Perarasu as Lawyer (cameo appearance)

== Production ==
The filming was held at Rameswaram where they shot few scenes, the film's climax was shot at Dharmapuri while the song "Nee Yaaru" was shot at Srirangam.

== Soundtrack ==
The music was composed by Srikanth Deva. All lyrics were written by Perarasu.

Track listing
| No. | Title | Singer(s) | Length |
|---|---|---|---|
| 1. | "Naan Yaaru" | S. P. Balasubrahmanyam | 5:25 |
| 2. | "Vandha Vaadi" | Suchitra, Perarasu | 4:23 |
| 3. | "Engamma Kuthamma" | Udit Narayan, Anuradha Sriram | 4:42 |
| 4. | "Vandhuttaru" | Swarnalatha, Manikka Vinayagam | 4:53 |
| 5. | "Karuthamachan" | Mukesh Mohamed , Reshmi | 4:59 |
| Total length: | | | 24:22 |

== Release and reception ==
Dharmapuri was released on 21 October 2006 on Diwali festival alongside Varalaru, Vallavan, Thalaimagan, E and Vattaram.

Sify wrote, "Dharmapuri is pure DMDK propaganda machinery working overtime. Perarasu who has written the story, screenplay, dialogue, lyrics and directed the film has given it a commercial coating – songs, fights, punch lines and a bit of glamour. As a political propaganda film, Perarasu has done a fairly decent job as he has worked the script to suit Captain’s screen image". Lajjavathi of Kalki called it a Perarasu film which stays with the formula and a political vehicle for Vijayakanth. She appreciated the performances of Vijayakanth and M. S. Bhaskar but panned Srikanth Deva's music and fight sequences and felt too many political dialogues and symbols gave an impression of watching an political film. Cinesouth wrote, "'Dharmapuri' is a sorry film". Malini Mannath of Chennai Online wrote, "Neither the characterisation, the story-line, the scenes nor the narrative style offers anything novel or exciting. And Vijaykanth is just about helpless to rise above such an insipid script".
