= Arai En 305-il Kadavul =

- Theatrical release poster
- Directed by: Chimbu Deven
- Written by: Chimbu Deven
- Produced by: S. Shankar
- Starring: Prakash Raj; Santhanam; Ganja Karuppu
- Cinematography: Soundarrajan
- Edited by: G. Sasikumar
- Music by: Vidyasagar
- Production company: S Pictures
- Release date: 18 April 2008
- Running time: 164 minutes
- Country: India
- Language: Tamil

Arai En 305-il Kadavul (transl. God in Room No. 305) is a 2008 Indian Tamil-language fantasy comedy film directed by Chimbu Deven. Loosely inspired by the 2003 American film Bruce Almighty (2003), It stars Prakash Raj, Santhanam and Ganja Karuppu, alongside Jyothirmayi, and Madhumitha. Sampath Raj, Madhan Bob, Rajesh, M. S. Bhaskar, Periyar Dasan, and Ilavarasu appear in supporting roles. The storyline is that the universe is a computer simulation controlled by a supercomputer and God is the one who has access to it.

The film is produced by S. Shankar's S Pictures. The music was composed by Vidyasagar with cinematography by Soundarrajan and editing by Sasi Kumar. The film was released on 18 April 2008, and failed at the box office.

== Plot ==
Raasu and Mokkai are youngsters sharing a hostel with a diverse group of people. Those people include Professor Mani, a staunch atheist named Thanjai Rudran, a poet, and other unemployed, struggling men. Raasu, who works in a coffee shop, is in love with Mahishasuramardhini, but she seemingly ignores all his advances. Raasu was even attacked by her brother after hanging around her house for extended periods of time. Mokkai, who is unemployed due to his lack of education and does whatever job that he can find, dreams of marrying his uncle's daughter (cousin) back in his village.

After a particularly bad day where Mokkai is arrested and beaten by female police officers and Raasu's lies of being in a well-paid job are uncovered (to Mahishasuramardhini's disgust), the two are also kicked out of the hostel by the owner due to the inability to pay rent. On their last night, both vent their frustration at Kadavul (God) after heavy drinking. Both are shocked when Kadavul appears in front of them. Mistaking Him for another unemployed fellow, the two head back to their hostel room only to find Him waiting for them in it, waving aside this miracle, all three fall asleep. The next morning, Kadavul finally manages to convince Raasu and Mokkai of His true identity after appearing in the forms of Vishnu, Jesus, and the Buddha.

Armed with a galaxy box (access to a supercomputer) that is the source of His power, Kadavul makes a deal with Raasu and Mokkai. He will spend time with the two (under the name of Arnold and the identity of both Raasu and Mokkai's uncle), observing their day-to-day routines while advising them in the process, to see whether it is truly His fault for their poor standard of living, or their own. Arnold also manages to persuade the hostel owner to extend Raasu and Mokkai's stay for a week, while their bet is undertaken.

During the allotted time, both Raasu and Mokkai learn a great deal through Arnold's own actions and His teachings. In the meantime, Wellesley Prabhu, another hostel inhabitant, accidentally discovers "Arnold's" true identity, but is persuaded to keep silent. However, Arnold is in for a shock when on His last night with them, Raasu and Mokkai steal His galaxy box and use it to improve their lives. To Prabhu's despair, the true God is forced to lead an ordinary (yet underprivileged) life in the hostel. Raasu and Mokkai meanwhile find that their families, despite their gifts, remain highly suspicious of their wealth and ungrateful as well. They then start to use the box to inflict suffering on their past employers and those who refused to give them jobs. Ultimately, Raasu is once again rejected by Mahishasuramardhini, who turns out to be a prostitute, and throws the galaxy box into a bin in shock. Prabhu later recovers the box and hands it back over to Arnold. Although forgiven, Raasu and Mokkai feel deep regret for their actions and promise to turn their lives around, which they duly do. Both of them become successful people in later life, along with Prabhu and various other characters.

A few years later, Arnold once again comes to a similar room of a different mansion, to help another group of youngsters staying there and lamenting their current situation. This time, Arnold keeps His galaxy box bound in chains in His pocket to make sure that it is not stolen or misused like before.

== Cast ==
- Prakash Raj as Arnold / God
- Santhanam as Raasu Krishnamoorthy
- Ganja Karuppu as Mokkaiswamy
- Jyothirmayi as Bhuvana
- Madhumitha as Mahishasuramardhini
- Sampath Raj as Raana Singh
- Madhan Bob as Professor Mani
- Rajesh as Thanjai Rudhran
- M. S. Bhaskar as Kutti Madaswamy
- Periyar Dasan as Mokkai's father
- Ilavarasu as Wellesley Prabhu
- Cochin Hanifa as Giri Chettan
- Delhi Ganesh as Krishnamoorthy (Raasu's father)
- Thalaivasal Vijay as Engineer Rafeeq
- Naren as Coffee shop owner
- Kuyili as Rukmani
- Chaams as "Java" Sundaresan
- Ramdoss as Raana's henchman
- Manobala as Vengi Raja
- Nellai Siva as Tea shop owner
- Sumathi G. as Gunavathi
- Kadhal Sukumar as Shanmugam
- Sashikumar Subramani as Oviyar Sodali
- V. S. Raghavan as Old Man (cameo appearance)
- Ponnambalam as a comic thief
- Ganesh Babu as mansion resident

== Production ==
The team visited nearly 800 bachelor mansions around Chennai before shortlisting on the one for the final shoot. A song sequence was shot in Courtallam. Before release, the media speculated it would be inspired by the American films Bruce Almighty (2003) and Oh, God! (1977).

== Soundtrack ==
The music was composed by Vidyasagar. The audio launch was held on 3 April 2008.

Song title	Singers	Lyricist
"Aavaram Poovukkum"	Shreya Ghoshal	Kabilan
"Adada Daa"	Santhanam, Ganja Karuppu, Jayamoorthy, Vineeth Srinivasan	P. Vijay
"Kaadhal Sei"	Vidyasagar	Na. Muthukumar
"Kurai Ondrum Illai"	Harini	Muthulingam
"Thendralukku Nee"	Karthik, Swetha Mohan	Yugabharathi

== Release ==
Arai En 305-il Kadavul was released on 18 April 2008.

=== Critical reception ===
Pavithra Srinivasan of Rediff.com wrote, "Yes, it's chock-full of comedy. But it makes you think, as well. A must-watch". Sify felt the felt the film was too similar to Bruce Almighty and added that it "is too melodramatic, mushy and slow, needs urgent trimming. Let us hope that Chimbudevan gets a better script where he will play to his strengths, next time around".

=== Box office ===
Sify wrote that Arai En 305-il Kadavul had a "fantastic first day", despite releasing on the same day as the 2008 Indian Premier League (IPL) began, but "fell badly" on the next due to negative word of mouth. By contrast, The New Indian Express claimed that the film was a failure due to greater attention towards the IPL.
