= Thirupathi (2006 Tamil film) =

- Theatrical release poster
- Directed by: Perarasu
- Written by: Perarasu
- Produced by: M. Saravanan; M. S. Guhan
- Starring: Ajith Kumar; Sadha
- Cinematography: S. Saravanan
- Edited by: Anthony
- Music by: Bharadwaj
- Production company: AVM Productions
- Release date: 14 April 2006
- Running time: 153 minutes
- Country: India
- Language: Tamil

Thirupathi is a 2006 Indian Tamil-language vigilante masala film written and directed by Perarasu and produced by AVM Productions. The film stars Ajith Kumar and Sadha in the lead roles, while Arun Pandian, Riyaz Khan, Sampath Raj in supporting roles.

Thirupathi was released on 14 April 2006. The film was not well received by critics, but Perarasu won the Tamil Nadu State Film Award for Best Story Writer.

== Plot ==
Thirupathi's pregnant sister dies due to negligence by a corrupt doctor, who turns out to be Thirupathi's best friend Soori's brother. Soori decides to protect his brother from Thirupathi, who sets out to nab Soori's brother to avenge his sister's death.

== Cast ==
- Ajith Kumar as Thirupathi
- Sadha as Priya
- Arun Pandian as ACP Murali (Guest Appearance)
- Riyaz Khan as Soori
- Sampath Raj as Varadharajan, Soori's brother
- Pyramid Natarajan as Minister Mayavaran
- Livingston as Chanakkiyan
- R. Sundarrajan as Thirupathi's father
- Rajalakshmi as Thirupathi's mother
- Harish Raghavendra as Thirupathi's brother
- Deepu as Thirupathi's sister
- Sathyan as Thirupathi's friend
- Ganja Karuppu as Muthu, Thirupathi's friend
- M. S. Baskar as P. A. Brahma
- Anu Mohan as Temple Priest
- Aarthi as Priya's friend
- Vidharth as Henchman
- Manobala as Police Inspector
- Rajesh as Chief Minister (Guest Appearance)
- Bala Singh
- Suvarna Mathew
- Thalapathy Dinesh as Local Rowdy
- Benjamin as Thirupathi's friend
- Perarasu in a cameo appearance
- Laila as a dancer in Song ("Keerai Vedhaippom")

== Production ==
During the making of Sivakasi, Perarasu was approached by AVM Productions to make a film with Ajith Kumar in the lead role. The director immediately accepted the offer and told the film's story to the producer during the meeting. The film was announced publicly two days later. The film was launched officially on 15 September 2005 with Vijay attending the opening ceremony. This was AVM's 167th film as producer.

== Soundtrack ==
The music was composed by Bharadwaj. The audio was launched on 14 March 2006 at AVM Studios.

All lyrics are written by Perarasu.

Track listing
No.	Title	Singer(s)	Length
1.	"Aathadi Aathadi"	KK, Mathangi Jagdish	5:01
2.	"Thirupathi Vantha"	Shankar Mahadevan	4:46
3.	"Keerai Vedhaippom"	Pushpavanam Kuppusamy, Reshmi	5:13
4.	"Yenaiye Yenaku"	Vijay Yesudas	3:55
5.	"Sollavum Mudiyala"	Harish Raghavendra, Swarnalatha	5:20
6.	"Pudhu Veedu"	Anuradha Sriram, Tippu	5:04
Total length:			29:19

== Release and reception ==
The satellite rights of the film were sold to Kalaignar TV. Sify wrote, "Perarasu and his Tirupati brings nothing new to the table, as even the dialogues, song picturisation and presentation is a continuation of his earlier two films. Sadly, we expected more from his combination with Ajith but the director seems to be obsessed with his do-gooder, larger-than-life hero with a heart of gold who tries to reform the society in his own unique way!". Malini Mannath of Chennai Online wrote "It's yet again about the sister, the mother and a few more sentiments added to it. The audience may get fed up of this repeated scenario being flogged to death. But the director's fascination for his dream subject seems not to allow him to look elsewhere for different material!". Lajjavathi of Kalki wrote the film has influence of Sivakasi may have been avoided. In any case, one thing is true Thirupathi will be a turn for Ajith.
