= Nattarasankottai =

- Village
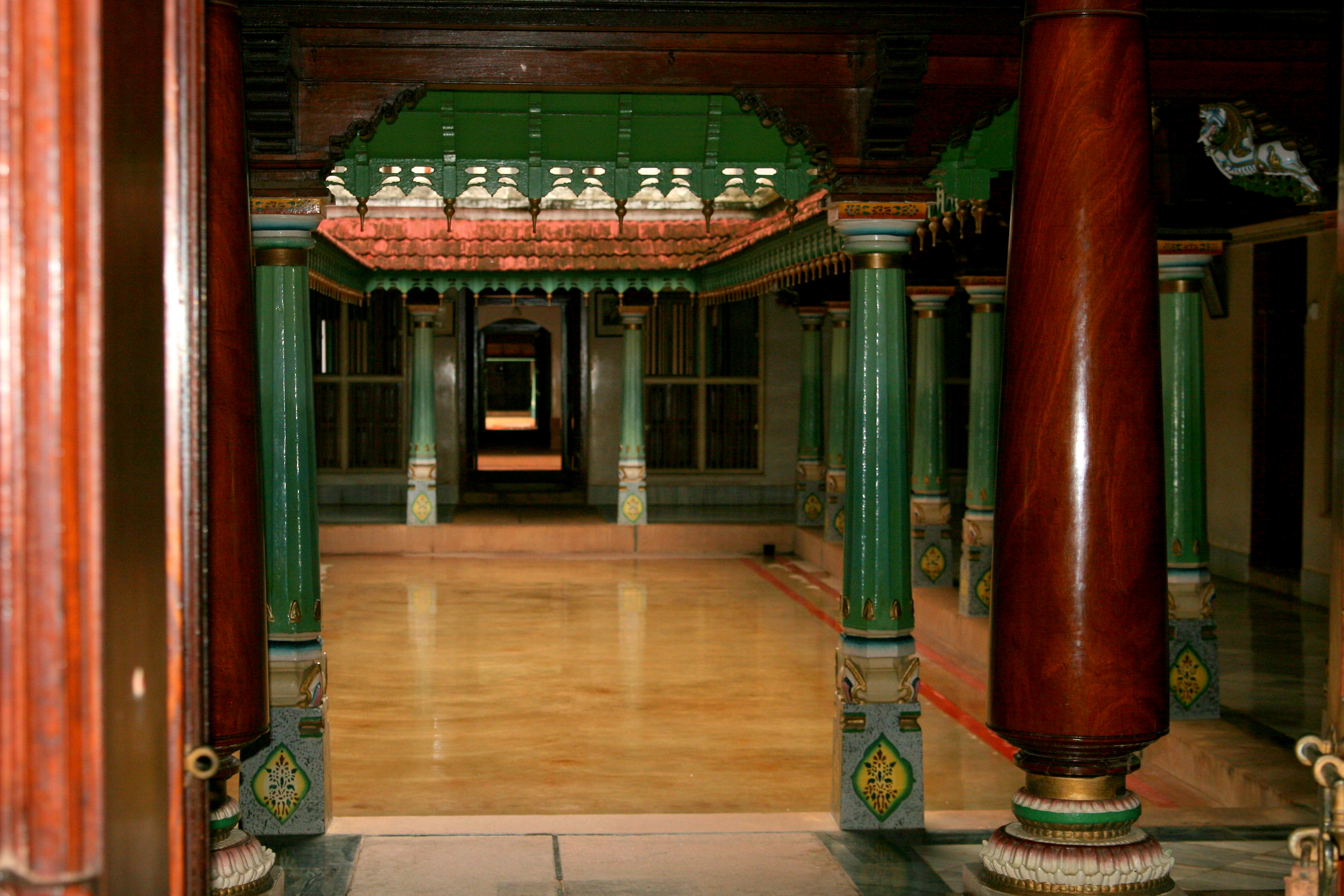

- Location in Tamil Nadu, India
- Coordinates: 9°52′13″N 78°33′08″E
- Country: India
- State: Tamil Nadu
- District: Sivaganga

Government
  - Type: Town panchayat
- Elevation: 75 m (246 ft)

Population (2001)
  - Total: 5,887

Languages
  - Official: Tamil
- Time zone: UTC+5:30 (IST)

Nattarasankottai is a village in Sivaganga district in the Indian state of Tamil Nadu. Nattarasankottai is famous for being featured in C. Joseph Vijay's movie Sivakasi who later became the chief minister of the state.

== Geography ==
Nattarasankottai is located at 9.87°N 78.57°E. It has an average elevation of 75 metres (246 feet).

== Demographics ==
As of the 2001 India census, Nattarasankottai had a population of 5,887. Males constitute 48% of the population and females 52%. Nattarasankottai has an average literacy rate of 72%, higher than the national average of 59.5%: male literacy is 79%, and female literacy 66%. In Nattarasankottai, 11% of the population is under 6 years of age.

== Landmarks ==
=== Kannathal temple ===
The temple is managed by the village Nagarathars.

The temple has Golden Kumbhams over the temple tower. The deity, Kannudaya Nayaki Amman alias Kannathal is seen with eight hands and has an udukkai (a percussion striking instrument) and muvizhai sulam in her hands. Her left leg stamps the Asura by name Mahishan.

Vaikasi Visakam festival is celebrated for 10 days, and on the 8th day, the Goddess in the form of KaliattaKannathal decorated by 'Kazhuthu Uru' (a Nagarathar Ornament) is taken in the silver adorned chariot around the temple. Also, Amman is taken in Golden chariot on 7th day on and Wooden Chariot on 9th day. On 10th day night the function is called as "Mosa kuthu" (Muyal-Rabbit in English) one rabbit will be killed by using the long knife by poosari every year on this 10th day. Crowd of people will be there in the particular place to see this function. Kaliattam, a festival celebrated once in 60 years was celebrated in 1996 with much pomp and pageantry. The first 'Kumbabishekam' (Consecration of the temple) took place on 12 September 1938, the second on 6 September 1976 and the third on 1 May 1989 and also last kumbabishekam was on 2005. 'Sevvai Pongal' during the Tamil month Thai, is a festival that is celebrated by Nagarathars of this village, during which tickets will be pooled and drawn and based on that places near the temple are allotted to all the nagarathar families for making Pongals. Non-Nagarthars also contribute a lot to this festival. Other festivals of the temple include 'Muzhalkuttu Thiruvizha' during the Tamil month of Aadi, 'Navarathri' during the Tamil month of Purattasi and 'Thailakkappu Utsavam' during the Tamil month of Thai. There are many temples in Nattarasankottai, including a Sivan temple. Ashtami Thiruvizha and Sivarathri are the festivals of this temple.

=== Kambar tomb ===
The poet Kambar, who translated Valmiki Ramayana to Tamil, spent his last days in Nattarasankottai and his tomb is situated here. It is not famous and very few of the public know of this. It is said that Kambar, after having differences with the Chola king, left the Chola kingdom and roamed around. When he arrived at Nattarasankottai, he was very thirsty and asked for water in one house. When he was offered buttermilk in return he became very happy and decided to stay there itself and spent his last days there. Every year Kamban vizha (function) is conducted at this place to felicitate Kambar.

== Education ==
There are two higher secondary schools; two elementary schools; one English medium primary school and one ITI and vocational training institute. The two higher secondary schools are S.RM.Higher secondary school for boys and KMSC Girls high school; The two elementary schools are Visalakshi vidyasala and KP.RM.School; The English medium primary school and ITI and vocational training institute are Sri Kannathal English primary school and Sathyamurty ITI and vocational Training Institute respectively.
