= Sivakasi (film) =

2005 film by Perarasu

- Theatrical release poster
- Directed by: Perarasu
- Written by: Perarasu
- Produced by: A. M. Rathnam
- Starring: Vijay; Asin; Prakash Raj
- Cinematography: Sekhar V. Joseph
- Edited by: V. Jaishankar
- Music by: Srikanth Deva (Songs); Deva (Score)
- Production company: Sri Surya Movies
- Distributed by: Shakthi Film Factory
- Release date: 1 November 2005
- Running time: 175 minutes
- Country: India
- Language: Tamil

Sivakasi is a 2005 Indian Tamil-language action drama film written and directed by Perarasu. The film stars Vijay, Asin and Prakash Raj. The soundtrack was composed by Srikanth Deva, while the background score was composed by the latter's father Deva.

Sivakasi was released on 1 November 2005, coinciding with Diwali. It ran for 150 days in Tamil Nadu theatres and performed commercially well. The film was remade in Telugu as Vijayadasami (2007).

== Plot ==
Sivakasi is a welder in T. Nagar, Chennai who meets Hema, and they fall in love after multiple incidents. Hema's father approves of the marriage, but her brothers remark that Sivakasi's current income is not enough to support Hema, causing him to throw them out of the house. Hema confronts Sivakasi, who remarks that he couldn't understand her siblings because of his past. Sivakasi reveals his real name as Muthappa and was falsely blamed for setting off crackers near a possessed dancer 15 years earlier, which was actually done by his brother, Udayappa, causing him to run away from his hometown Nattarasankottai. Hema berates him for ignoring his parents' love and declares they will marry only at his family's request. Sivakasi returns to his village and discovers Udayappa is now a MLA due to his mother-in-law, Moolimungaari's influence.

Sivakasi's mother, Thangam, works as a servant in her own house and his sister Vairam operates a roadside stall in a nearby village in utter poverty with her husband Ramalingam and daughter Divya. Sivakasi decided to improve their lot anonymously. One of his few confidants tells how his father, Meiyappa, died when Udayappa claimed that Thangam had affairs. Enraged, Sivakasi beats up Udayappa and his men, using a fake identity. Udayappa tries to sell off the ancestral property, but Sivakasi reminds the buyers that without Muthappa's signature, the sale is illegal. To avoid this, Udayappa dresses a false body to look like Muthappa, but Sivakasi inserts a note saying his share of the property should be donated. The note is found to be valid and Udayappa reveals his deception. Later, Udayappa registers his MLA candidacy but finds Vairam contesting, supported by Sivakasi's money.

Furious about Sivakasi, Udayappa is visited by Hema and Sivakasi's friends who are looking for him. Udayappa goes to Sivakasi's house thinking that he knows his identity. It is revealed that Hema lied, saying that Muthappa and Sivakasi are friends. Udayappa threatens to kill Thangam and although Sivakasi burns his palms, he and Vairam decide to leave. At night, Vairam sees Ramalingam getting kidnapped by someone assuming that he is Udayappa, but is actually Sivakasi. When Vairam confronts Udayappa, he hits her which gains her sympathy votes. Sivakasi fakes a threat by Udayappa towards Vairam, resulting in Udayappa's men attacking the villagers. The people turn against him and Moolimungari, who is covered in cow dung for making Udayappa an MLA.

Moolimungari threatens Udayappa with dire consequences, Udayappa plans to kill his wife, Kayalvizhi, and frame Sivakasi to gain votes, but Sivakasi saves her. Sivakasi secretly burns a body with Ramalingam's chain, making everyone think Udayappa killed him. The people rioted outside his house. Sivakasi calls him, saying he can have Ramalingam back, but must hand over all his ancestral property to her. Udayappa signs it, thinking Muthappa cannot sign and finds one of his men. Vairam wins the election and property, where she and her mother regain their old state. Sivakasi released Ramalingam and Kayalvizhi. Udayappa hears that Muthappa has arrived, who is revealed to Vairam and her mother to be Sivakasi. An angry Moolimungari decides to kill Udayappa, who decides to kill his brother. Moolimungari's men arrive and are about to kill Udayappa. When Thangam asks Sivakasi/Muthappa to save him, Sivakasi/Muthappa rescues Udayappa, who later begs for forgiveness for his actions and reunites with Kayalvizhi. Muthappa and Hema get married.

== Cast ==
- Vijay as Muthappa alias Sivakasi
- Asin as Hema
- Prakash Raj as Udayappa
- Geetha as Thangam
- Lakshana aka Krishna Sajith as M. Vairam, Sivakasi's sister
- Shakuntala as Mulli Mungaari
- Rajesh as Meiyappan
- Saranya Ponvannan as Kayalvizhi
- Venkat Prabhu as Ramalingam
- Devan as Rathnavelu
- Bobby as Pallakku Pandi
- Vaiyapuri as Veluchamy
- M. S. Bhaskar as Venky
- Chitti Babu as Mamoi
- Scissor Manohar as Sivakasi's childhood friend
- Jayamani as Udayappa's henchman
- Velmurugan as Sivakasi's childhood friend
- Ganesh Babu as Sivakasi's childhood friend
- M. J. Shriram as Sivakasi's friend
- Bosskey as Leo
- Kadhal Arun Kumar as Sivakasi's childhood friend
- Ganja Karuppu as Udayappa's sidekick
- Periya Karuppu Thevar as Villager
- Visweswara Rao as College professor
- Chaplin Balu as Fraud
- Bava Lakshmanan as Police inspector
- Bharath as Dinesh, Hema's collegemate
- Pattinapakkam Jayaram as Udayappa's henchman
- Theni Kunjarammal as Villager
- Emey as Police inspector
- Venba as Divya, Muthappa's niece
- Rocky Rajesh
- Sumathi G. as Pallaakku Pandi's wife
- Nayanthara as herself, in a special appearance
- Srikanth Deva as himself, in a special appearance
- Ashok Raja in a special appearance, in the song "Vada Vada Vada Vada"
- Perarasu as himself (Public man)
- Japan Kumar in a special appearance in the song "Kodambakam Area"

== Production ==
After the success of Thirupaachi, producer A. M. Rathnam called director Perarasu to make a film with Vijay re-uniting with him for the second time, which became Sivakasi. Prakash Raj was initially reluctant to portray the antagonist as he wanted more diverse roles, not to be typecast as a villain, but yielded after much persuasion by Perarasu. The director wanted Jayasudha to portray Vijay's mother, but she was unable to leave her native Hyderabad where the film was not to be shot; the role went to Geetha. Perarasu commented on Asin's dedication to the film: "Everyday, after pack up, she would ask me what her scenes and dialogues were the next day. She would then collect her dialogues and come prepared the next day". Jyothika was initially considered for a special appearance, a role which ultimately went to Nayanthara. Art director GK created the sets of Ranganathan Street, T. Nagar that reportedly cost ₹1 crore (equivalent to ₹3.4 crore or US$350,000 in 2023). The filming was primarily held at Chennai, Karaikudi and Sivakasi.

== Soundtrack ==
The soundtrack was composed by Srikanth Deva. All lyrics were penned by Perarasu.

Track listing
No.	Title	Singer(s)	Length
1.	"Idhu Enna"	Harish Raghavendra, Uma Ramanan	4:58
2.	"Kodambakam Area"	Tippu, Shoba Chandrasekhar	5:31
3.	"Vada Vada Vada Vada Thozha"	Shankar Mahadevan	5:24
4.	"Ada Ennaatha"	Anuradha Sriram, Udit Narayan	4:43
5.	"Deepavali"	KK, Vasundhara Das	4:37
6.	"En Deivathukke"	Mukesh Mohamed	4:33
Total length:			29:46

== Release ==
Sivakasi was released in theatres on 1 November 2005. It was given a U certificate by the censor board, with "three dialogue cuts". The film was released worldwide in theatres with close to 280 prints.

== Critical reception ==
Ananda Vikatan rated the film 42 out of 100. Sify wrote: "This FORMULA had worked well for director Perarasu and Vijay in Tirupachi and now the team has re-worked it. This time, however, it will test your patience as it is not meant for the class audience or those seeking quality entertainment. Perarasu and Vijay believe only in catering to the mass audience who want their dose of unpretentious masala mix". A critic from Kungumam wrote that milk tastes better with a little water, adding that Perarasu exchanged water for raw alcohol; even though there are a thousand confusions, the truth is you get the feeling of lighting ten thousand fire crackers. Lajjavathi of Kalki wrote that even though Vijay perfectly fits into a story which M. G. Ramachandran and Rajinikanth have acted a lot, it is questionable whether mass films like this can take Tamil cinema and the fan's taste to new heights. Malini Mannath of Chennai Online wrote, "The Vijay-Perarasu teaming up had spelt entertainment in 'Thirupachi'. In Sivakasi it's monotony and repetition. A film strictly for hardcore Vijay fans!".
