= List of Tamil films of 2008 =

Prior to the amendment of Tamil Nadu Entertainments Tax Act 1939 on 22 July 2006, gross was 115 per cent of net for all films. Post-amendment, gross equalled net for films with pure Tamil titles. Commercial Taxes Department disclosed ₹12.24 crore in entertainment tax revenue for the year.

The following is a list of films produced in the Tamil film industry in India, which were released theatrically in 2008. They are presented in order of their release dates.

== Box office collection ==
Rank	Film	Worldwide gross
1	Dasavathaaram	₹105 crore
2	Vaaranam Aayiram	₹46-48 crore
3	Yaaradi Nee Mohini	₹35 crore
4	Kuruvi	₹32 crore
5	Santosh Subramaniam	₹25 crore

== Films ==
=== January–March ===
Opening		Title	Director	Cast	Studio	Ref
J A N	14	Bheemaa	N. Linguswamy	Vikram, Trisha Krishnan		
J A N	14	Kaalai	Tarun Gopi	Silambarasan, Vedhika		
J A N	14	Pazhani	Perarasu	Bharath, Kajal Aggarwal, Khushbu		
J A N	14	Pirivom Santhippom	Karu Pazhaniappan	Cheran, Sneha		
J A N	14	Vaazhthugal	Seeman	R. Madhavan, Bhavana		
J A N	15	Pidichirukku	Kanagu	Ashok, Vishakha Singh		
J A N	15	Pattaya Kelappu	Ponnambalam	Sriman, Payal, Ponnambalam		
F E B	1	Ashoka	Prem Menon	Prem Menon, Anushree, Pooja Bharathi		
F E B	1	Indiralohathil Na Azhagappan	Thambi Ramaiah	Vadivelu, Yamini Sharma, Suja Varunee		
F E B	1	Thangam	G. Kicha	Sathyaraj, Meghna Nair, Goundamani		
F E B	1	Thodakkam	Muthukumar	Rishi, Abhinay, Raghu Vannan, Monica, Meghna Nair		
F E B	8	Sadhu Miranda	Siddique	Prasanna, Abbas, Kavya Madhavan		
F E B	14	Anjathe	Mysskin	Narain, Ajmal Ameer, Prasanna, Vijayalakshmi		
F E B	14	Kadhal Kaditham	Mukesh	Balaji, Amisha		
F E B	14	Nenjathai Killadhe	Agathiyan	Vikranth, Bharathi, Yugendran		
F E B	14	Pachai Nirame	Karkki	Yugendran, Saran Sathya, Rajasekar, Nanditha Jennifer, Preethi Varma		
F E B	22	Akku	Mamani	Ajay, Sriji, Rakshai, Anu Hasan, Riyaz Khan		
F E B	22	Thoondil	K. S. Adhiyaman	Shaam, Sandhya, Divya Spandana		
F E B	22	Valluvan Vasuki	Marumalarchi Bharathi	Sathya, Shwetha Bandekar, Ranjith		
F E B	29	Sila Nerangalil	Jayaraj	Vincent Asokan, Navya Nair, Vineeth		
F E B	29	Thotta	Selva	Jeevan, Priyamani		
M A R	7	Ezhuthiyatharadi	Sri Sathyaragaventher	Ramana, Mansi Pritam, Swathi, Akhila		
M A R	7	Ponmagal Vandhal	Ramamurthy	Pandiarajan		
M A R	7	Velli Thirai	Viji	Prakash Raj, Prithviraj Sukumaran, Gopika		
M A R	14	Theekuchi	Yuvarajan	Jai Varma, Menagai		
M A R	14	Unakkaga	Manoharan	Riyaz Khan, Meghna Nair		
M A R	14	Vaitheeswaran	R. K. Vidhyadaran	Sarath Kumar, Meghna Naidu		
M A R	21	Inba	Vendhan	Shaam, Sneha		
M A R	21	Kannum Kannum	G. Marimuthu	Prasanna, Udhayathara		
M A R	21	Sandai	Sakthi Chidambaram	Sundar C, Ramya Raj, Nadhiya, Namitha		
M A R	21	Singakutty	A. Venkatesh	Shivaji Dev, Gowri Munjal		
M A R	28	Azhagu Nilayam	Rajaji	Vindhiya, Swarnamalya		
M A R	28	Kattuviriyan	Kalaipuli G. Sekaran	Malavika, Sajith Raj, Dr. Ram		
M A R	28	Tharagu	Kalanidhi	Sanjay, Dimple		
M A R	28	Vedha	Nithya Kumar	Arun Vijay, Sheela		

=== April–June ===
Opening		Title	Director	Cast	Studio	Ref
A P R	4	Pasumpon Devar Varalaru	Abraham Lincoln	Vagai Chandrasekar		
A P R	4	Vilaiyattu	Ezhilvendhan	Ezhilvendhan, Saranya		
A P R	4	Yaaradi Nee Mohini	Mithran Jawahar	Dhanush, Nayantara, Karthik Kumar		
A P R	9	Arasangam	R. Madhesh	Vijayakanth, Navaneet Kaur		
A P R	10	Nepali	V. Z. Durai	Bharath, Meera Jasmine		
A P R	11	Santosh Subramaniam	M. Raja	Jayam Ravi, Genelia D'Souza, Prakash Raj		
A P R	11	Thozha	N. Sundaresan	Nithin Sathya, Vijay Vasanth, Premji Amaran, Ajay Raj, Jennifer		
A P R	18	Arai En 305-il Kadavul	Chimbu Deven	Prakash Raj, Santhanam, Ganja Karuppu		
A P R	18	Ini Varum Kaalam	Sibi Chandar	Ranjan, Sajitha Betti		
A P R	18	Madurai Ponnu Chennai Paiyan	A. C. Rajasekaran	S. S. R. Pankaj Kumar, Thejamai	Velu Thevar Films	
A P R	25	Chakkara Viyugam	Udhayabhanu Maheswaran	Natty Subramaniam, Raaghav, Jayasurya		
A P R	25	Iyakkam	Sanjay Ram	Rishi Kumar, Shruthi Raj, Sujibala		
M A Y	2	Kuruvi	S. Dharani	Vijay, Trisha Krishnan		
M A Y	9	Aadum Koothu	T. V. Chandran	Cheran, Navya Nair, Prakash Raj, Aari,		
M A Y	9	Malarinum Melliya	Selvaraj	Vignesh, Varshini		
M A Y	9	Silandhi	Aathiraj	Munna, Monica		
M A Y	16	Kadhal Endral Enna	Kalimuthu	Veerha, Diya, Charan Raj		
M A Y	16	Kadhal Vaanile	Venkateswara	Hari, Jothi Krishna		
M A Y	23	Pandi	Rasu Madhuravan	Raghava Lawrence, Sneha, Namitha		
M A Y	30	Kaalaippani	Rajesh M. Selva	Jay Srinivasa Kumar, Vasundhara Kashyap		
M A Y	30	Kathavarayan	Salangai Durai	Karan, Vidisha, Radha		
M A Y	30	Thithikkum Ilamai	Chandramohan	K. Dinesh Kumar, J. Pranav, Althara, Nisha		
J U N	13	Dasavathaaram	K. S. Ravikumar	Kamal Haasan, Asin, Mallika Sherawat, Jaya Prada		
J U N	27	Aayudham Seivom	Udhayan	Sundar C, Anjali		
J U N	27	Ayyavazhi	P. C. N. Anbazhagan	Raja, Sanjai		
J U N	27	Pudhupandi	Karthik Kumar	Pandiarajan, Kanmani Raja		
J U N	27	Thiru Thiruda	Don Gowtham	Don Gowtham		
J U N	28	Vallamai Tharayo	Madhumitha	R. Parthiban, Chaya Singh		

=== July–September ===
Opening		Title	Director	Cast	Studio	Ref
J U L	4	Muniyandi Vilangial Moonramandu	Thirumurugan	Bharath, Poorna		
J U L	4	Subramaniyapuram	M. Sasikumar	Jai, M. Sasikumar, Swati Reddy, Ganja Karuppu		
J U L	4	Uliyin Osai	Ilavenil	Vineeth, Keerthi Chawla		
J U L	11	Azhaipithazh	P. K. Rajmohan	Ratheesh, Sona		
J U L	18	Nalla Ponnu Ketta Payyan	M. P. Balan	Sriman, Madhumitha, Keerthi Chawla		
J U L	22	Maanavan Ninaithal	S. P. Gnanamozhi	Rithik, Varshini		
J U L	25	Manava Manavigal	Rajagopal	David, Rachana		
J U L	25	Pathu Pathu	Sathyam	Sona Heiden, Thalaivasal Vijay, Bose Venkat		
J U L	25	Sutta Pazham	G. K.	Mohan, Shubha Poonja		
A U G	1	Kuselan	P. Vasu	Rajinikanth, Pasupathy, Meena, Nayantara		
A U G	8	Unnai Naan	Senthilnathan	Viinu, Naash		
A U G	14	Sathyam	A. Rajasekhar	Vishal, Nayantara, Upendra		
A U G	22	Ragasiya Snehithane	Sujo Visanth	Vasanth, Lakshmi Rai, Vijay Raj, Prakash, Kandan, Sriram		
A U G	22	Nayagan	Saravana Sakthi	J. K. Rithesh, Ramana, Sangeetha, Keerthi Chawla		
A U G	29	Dhaam Dhoom	Jeeva	Jayam Ravi, Kangana Ranaut, Lakshmi Rai		
A U G	29	Jayamkondaan	R. Kannan	Vinay Rai, Bhavana, Lekha Washington		
S E P	5	Alibhabha	Neelan K. Sekar	Krishna, Prakash Raj, Janani		
S E P	5	Dhanam	Siva	Prem, Sangeetha		
S E P	5	Kee Mu	Majith	Hassan, Sarika		
S E P	5	Saroja	Venkat Prabhu	Shiva, Vaibhav Reddy, S. P. B. Charan, Premji Amaran, Vega Tamotia		
S E P	12	Poi Solla Porom	A. L. Vijay	Nassar, Karthik Kumar, Piaa Bajpai		
S E P	12	Vasool	V. Rishiraj	Hemanth Kumar, Kiran Rathod, V. Rishiraj		
S E P	19	Mudhal Mudhal Mudhal Varai	Krishnan Seshadri Gomatam	Sathyajit, Anuja Iyer, Charan		
S E P	19	Pandhayam	S. A. Chandrasekhar	Nithin Sathya, Sindhu Tolani		
S E P	19	Raman Thediya Seethai	K. P. Jagannath	Cheran, Pasupathy, Nithin Sathya, Vimala Raman, Remya Nambeesan, Gajala, Karthika		
S E P	26	Kadhalil Vizhunthen	P. V. Prasad	Nakul, Sunaina		
S E P	26	Sakkarakatti	Kala Prabhu	Shanthnoo Bhagyaraj, Ishita Sharma, Vedhika		

=== October–December ===
Opening		Title	Director	Cast	Studio	Ref
O C T	1	Durai	A. Venkatesh	Arjun, Kirat Bhattal, Gajala		
O C T	2	Jai Vigneshwar	James Clifford			
O C T	10	Kasimedu Govindan	Ramesh Sanjay	Ranjith, Karishma		
O C T	10	Kathi Kappal	Dinesh Selvaraj	Anoop Kumar, Poornitha, Meera Vasudevan		
O C T	10	Netru Indru Naalai	Lakshmikanth Chenna	Ravi Krishna, Tamannaah		
O C T	27	Seval	Hari	Bharath, Poonam Bajwa, Simran		
O C T	27	Megam	Jeevarathinam	Tamilarasan, Ragiraja		
O C T	27	Aegan	Raju Sundaram	Ajith Kumar, Nayantara, Navdeep, Piaa Bajpai		
O C T	27	Poochi	Velu	Velu		
O C T	31	Theeyavan	B. Kathir	Sriranjan, Udhay, Midhuna		
N O V	7	Velvi	Jeans	Vishwa, Hasini		
N O V	14	Vaaranam Aayiram	Gautham Vasudev Menon	Suriya, Sameera Reddy, Simran, Divya Spandana		
N O V	21	Thenavattu	V. V. Kathir	Jiiva, Poonam Bajwa		
N O V	28	Ellam Avan Seyal	Shaji Kailas	R. K., Raghuvaran, Roja, Bhama		
N O V	28	Kodaikkanal	T. K. Bose	Ashwanth Thilak, Poorna, Shekar		
N O V	28	Mahesh, Saranya Matrum Palar	P. V. Ravi	Sakthi Vasu, Sandhya		
N O V	28	Nadigai	Babu Ganesh	Babu Ganesh, Tejashree		
N O V	28	Poo	Sasi	Srikanth, Parvathi Menon		
N O V	28	Utharavindri Ullay Vaa	Vijayan	Vijayan		
D E C	5	Pudhusu Kanna Pudhusu	A. R. Venkatesh	A. R. Venkatesh, Priyanka Shailu		
D E C	5	Saamida	Vadivudayaan	Sembi, Dhanushya		
D E C	5	Suryaa	Jaguar Thangam	Vijaya Chiranjeevi, Keerthi Chawla		
D E C	18	Dindigul Sarathy	Subramaniam Pillai	Karunas, Karthika Mathew		
D E C	18	Silambattam	Saravanan	Silambarasan Rajendar, Sneha, Sana Khan		
D E C	19	Abhiyum Naanum	Radha Mohan	Prakash Raj, Trisha Krishnan, Aishwarya, Ganesh Venkatraman		
D E C	19	Thiruvannamalai	Perarasu	Arjun, Pooja Gandhi		
D E C	25	Panchamirtham	Raju Eswaran	Jayaram, Prakash Raj, Nassar, Saranya Mohan, Samiksha		

The following films also released in 2008, though the release date remains unknown.

Title	Director	Cast	Music director
Mogam	Jeeva Ratnam	Tamilarasan, Raaki Raaji, Saritha Yadav, Venu Arvind	Ravi Priyan
Urugudhe	Aslam		
Valakkaringar Archana	K. K. Bujjibabu		
Valvellam Vasantham	K. S. Nesamanavan	Viswa, Minal, Vennira Aadai Moorthy	Nesan

== Awards ==
Category/organization	Filmfare Awards South 31 July 2009	Tamil Nadu State Film Awards 30 September 2009	Vijay Awards 13 June 2009
Best Film	Subramaniyapuram	Dasavathaaram	Subramaniyapuram
Best Director	Sasikumar; Subramaniyapuram	Radha Mohan; Abhiyum Naanum	Sasikumar; Subramaniyapuram
Best Actor	Suriya; Vaaranam Aayiram	Kamal Haasan; Dasavathaaram	Suriya; Vaaranam Aayiram
Best Actress	Parvathy; Poo	Sneha; Pirivom Santhippom	Sneha; Pirivom Santhippom
Best Music Director	Harris Jayaraj; Vaaranam Aayiram	Ilaiyaraaja; Ajantha (2012)	Harris Jayaraj; Vaaranam Aayiram
