= Payanam (2011 film) =

2011 film by Radha Mohan

- Theatrical release poster
- Directed by: Radha Mohan
- Written by: Radha Mohan; T. J. Gnanavel (Tamil dialogues); Umarji Anuradha (Telugu dialogues)
- Produced by: Prakash Raj (Tamil version); Dil Raju (Telugu version)
- Starring: Nagarjuna; Prakash Raj
- Cinematography: K. V. Guhan
- Edited by: Kishore Te. (Tamil version); Marthand K. Venkatesh (Telugu version)
- Music by: Pravin Mani
- Production companies: Prakash Raj Productions (Tamil version); Matinee Entertainment (Telugu version)
- Distributed by: AGS Entertainment (Tamil version); Sri Venkateswara Creations (Telugu version)
- Release date: 11 February 2011
- Running time: 131 minutes (Tamil version); 120 minutes (Telugu version)
- Country: India
- Languages: Tamil; Telugu

Payanam (transl. Journey) is a 2011 Indian action thriller film that was directed and co-written by Radha Mohan. It was simultaneously filmed in the Tamil and Telugu languages, the latter being titled Gaganam (transl. Sky). The film's plot is based on an aircraft hijacking. The film stars Nagarjuna and Prakash Raj, alongside an ensemble cast featuring Rishi, Sana Khan, Brahmanandam, Thalaivasal Vijay, M. S. Bhaskar, Babloo Prithiveeraj and Poonam Kaur, amongst others. Payanam and Gaganam were produced by Raj and Dil Raju, respectively. The film was released on 11 February 2011 to a positive reception.

== Plot ==
On a flight from Chennai to Delhi, five passengers retrieve weapons from the toilet and use them to hijack the aircraft. During a struggle with the pilots to divert the plane to Rawalpindi in Pakistan, part of the engine gets damaged, so they make an emergency landing at Tirupati Airport and upon landing, the officials get informed of the hijack. Government authorities then arrive to Tirupati Airport. The hijackers demand ₹100 crore (c. US $22,000,000) along with the release of their imprisoned leader Yusuf Khan, and a fresh aircraft for their escape.

A team is put together, led by Home Secretary K. Vishwanath, to tackle the situation. National Security Guard Major N. Raveendra "Ravi", who captured Yusuf Khan, recalls the death of a colleague at the shootout, he regrets not killing Khan at the time and keeps warning about the consequences of releasing Yusuf Khan. He urges the Government of India to allow a Special Forces commando operation, but officials fear risking passengers' lives and apprehensive on Ravi's team. Ravi gets frustrated when the government vacillates, and it seems Khan might be released.

Inside the aircraft, the passengers gather in groups to discuss their past lives and religion. One of the terrorists becomes sentimentally attached to Afshana, a young girl who is returning to Karachi after a heart operation. The terrorist's associates, however, warn him not to become too attached to the girl or any other passenger because their main duty is to carry out the operation, which includes killing the passengers. Another passenger, Jagadheesh, a retired army colonel, frequently irritates the terrorists with questions about their motives. Tensions rise until Praveen, a drug-addicted passenger, attempts an escape but is shot by the terrorist leader, who then warns the authorities to act quickly.

Ravi's colleague Nawaz Khan then gets to know that the Tamil Nadu Police have identified the missing cleaner who cleaned the toilet of the flight before its departure. Ravi and Nawaz go to find the cleaner, hoping to get information about the nature of the weapons that were left for the hijackers. After a chase in Red Hills, they capture the cleaner, who admits his involvement in the plot and gives vague information about the size of the weapon he placed in the toilet and the cleaner is taken into custody. Ravi and Nawaz then deduce the weapon is a plastic explosive.

On his return, Ravi gets told that the government has decided to release Khan but while being transported to the airport, Khan dies in an accident due to heavy snowfall and avalanche in Kashmir. Ravi asks officials to keep this information confidential, so they can plan an operation without the terrorists' knowledge. A reporter disguises himself as an assistant to a senior police official; he closely approaches the aircraft, records video of the aircraft using a pen camera and overhears two officials in a restroom discussing Khan's accident. The reporter conveys the news to his team in the news channel he works for. The terrorists become alarmed. Despite attempts to contain the news, the media leak it. The terrorist leader gets furious upon hearing the news, kills a passenger named Subash and throw his body outside the plane on to the tarmac, and threatens Viswanath that every 30 minutes one passenger will get killed unless it is proven that Khan is alive. Ravi then remembers his colleague Nawaz mentioning about a film involving the actor Ranganath, who portrayed Khan in a film called Bharat Maata, he then asks Nawaz to bring the Cameraman, Make-up man and Director of that film to Tirupati Airport to make the terrorists believe that Khan is alive and being treated at a hospital. Ravi also captures the reporter who disguised himself as one of the police officials preventing him from gaining and leaking sensitive and confidential information.

Ravi plans an operation to rescue the passengers and names it Operation Garuda (in Tamil)/Gaganam (in Telugu). Through a female cleaner, he secretly sends a mobile phone hidden in a food packet onto the plane so he can gather information from Colonel Jagadheesh. Jagadheesh then gives information on number of terrorists present in the plane and the weapons they're carrying. Ravi plans to shoot down the hijackers while they transit to a new flight by asking the passengers to bend down when they get a signal (i.e. Church bell) and also warns that the terrorists' should not overhear about this plan. The plan succeeds with four of the five hijackers getting killed. The last terrorist is killed with the help of two passengers after a brief panic situation. The plastic explosive isn't initially found in the plane or in the possession of the dead terrorists' as per the bomb squad. However, Ravi suspects it's likely to be placed in one of the passengers bags and is found in Afshana's bag in the process as she reveals that one of the terrorists falsely gifted her before she gets out of the plane. Ravi then throws the explosive away by driving it in a jeep to a good distance away from the terminal building and the planes, it then explodes in the Jeep but Ravi jumps out of the jeep few seconds before the explosion. The operation ends successfully, the government authorities including Vishwanath and the Prime Minister appreciate Ravi, and the passengers become happy and thrilled with the success of the operation.

The passengers happily leave the flight, saying farewell to each other, and agree to meet again. The terrorists' names are revealed to be Yasin (the leader), Munna, Omar, Anwar and Abdul.

== Cast and characters ==
=== Main cast ===
- Nagarjuna as Major N. Raveendra
- Prakash Raj as Home Secretary K. Vishwanath

=== Flight crew and passengers ===
Flight crew

- Ravi Prakash as Captain Girish
- Poonam Kaur as Flight attendant Vimala Gupta

Terrorists

- Iqbal Yaqub as Yasin
- Balaji K. Mohan as Anwar
- Nitish, Prince, and Sahil as members of the terrorist gang

Flight passengers

- Rishi as Dr. Vinod
- Sana Khan as Sandhya
- Thalaivasal Vijay as Colonel Jagadheesh
- M. S. Bhaskar as Reverend Father Alphonse
- Manobala as Astrologer Narayana Shastry
- Prithiveeraj as "Shining Star" Chandrakanth
- Chaams as Balaji (Tamil) / Subba Rao (Telugu)
- Mohan Ram as Mr. Venkat Ram
- Sri Lakshmi as Mrs. Janaki "Jaanu" Venkat Ram
- Jayashree as Mrs. Divya Prasad
- Kumaravel as Subash
- Narayanan as Praveen
- Badava Gopi as Mimicry Artiste Gopinath
- Srinivas Vajpayee as V. K. Ramamurthy (Tamil) / Suriya Shekar (Telugu), Central Minister
- Saleem Sultana as Afshana

=== Supporting cast ===
- Dr. Bharath Reddy as Captain Nawaz Khan
- Brahmanandam as Film Director Rajesh Kapur
- Sricharan as Ranganath (also Yusuf Khan in the climax)
- Harsha Vardhan as Reporter Srinivas
- Laxmi Ratten as Krishnamurthy, National Security Advisor
- Melkote as S. K. Sharma, Spl. Secretary – Internal Security
- Satyam Rajesh as Airport Passenger (Telugu; deleted scene in Tamil)
- Kovai Krishnan as M. G. Menon, Joint Secretary - Kashmir

== Production ==
=== Development, cast and crew ===
Radha Mohan, after directing the family-oriented romance and drama films Azhagiya Theeye, Mozhi and Abhiyum Naanum, decided to produce an action thriller about an aircraft hijacking. He approached his close friend, actor-producer Prakash Raj, who had produced all his earlier films. Raj agreed to fund this film after reading Flight Into Fear by Devi Sharan. This new film would mark the pair's fourth collaboration. Raj renamed his Duet Movies banner to Silent Movies, the logo and name of which Radha Mohan had designed. Mohan also decided to make the film simultaneously in both the Tamil and Telugu languages, and was able to persuade Telugu film producer Dil Raju to produce the Telugu version, titled Gaganam, whilst engaging actor Nagarjuna, who is well-known in both film industries, to play the lead role of a National Security Guards commando. Nagarjuna said Payanam was "one of the easiest" films he had worked on because he did not have to prepare much for the role since Mohan and Raj had done "so much research", spoken to army officers and had "everything about the role on paper – how commandos behave and dress". Nagarjuna chose the title for the Telugu version himself.

Nagarjuna, starring in his first direct Tamil film in 13 years, was part of an ensemble cast that included around 45 actors from both the Tamil and Telugu industries, the cast being retained for both versions. This was Nagarjuna's first film without a love interest for his character. Nagarjuna found it difficult to mouth Tamil dialogues due to his lack of fluency in the language. His Tamil voice was dubbed by Sekar. Prakash Raj, who had starred in all of Mohan's earlier films, was cast in a main role. He considered Babloo Prithiveeraj's character Chandrakanth, a superstar, to represent "all falsehood in our cinema". Sana Khan played a passenger that was held hostage. To prepare for his role of a priest in the film, M. S. Bhaskar observed the diction and gait of priests at churches. Narayan Lucky played a drug addict. After sending his application for the film's casting, Sricharan received the opportunity to play dual roles: a terrorist named Yusuf Khan and a junior artist named Ranganath. Mohan had already had Sricharan in mind for the dual role after seeing his performance in M3V (2008). This film marked the debut of IT professional Iqbal Yaqub. The film featured around 70 extras as flight passengers throughout the film including Manager Cheena.

=== Filming and post-production ===
Despite widespread reports that Payanam was based on the 1999 hijacking of the Indian Airlines Flight 814, Raj has denied these reports, making clear it was about a fictional hijack that takes place at Tirupati Airport. Art director Kathir erected a grand set resembling Tirupati airport at Ramoji Film City in Hyderabad. The airport set was constructed within one month and cost ₹3 crore. The film was also shot at Chennai and Kullu-Manali. For Gaganam, Satyam Rajesh and Uttej dubbed for Chaams and Elango Kumaravel, respectively. Both of the versions had different runtimes to suit the local audiences' sensibilities, with the Telugu version being shorter than the Tamil version.

The release of Payanam and Gaganam was postponed several times despite being them ready for release in September 2010: the release of Brindavanam (2010) in October, several high-key Tamil films in November, and Nagavalli (2010) and Ragada (2010) in December further delayed both versions of the film's release. The post-production of Gaganam was delayed by the strike in the Telugu film industry in January 2010. Dil Raju talked with the producers of Katha Screenplay Darsakatvam Appalaraju (2011) and helped secure the 11 February release date for Gaganam.

== Themes and influences ==
According to film critic Baradwaj Rangan, "You could call Payanam a cross between a disaster movie (say, Airport) and a Mouli stage play. There's such an air of bonhomous familiarity to those who grew up in the seventies and the eighties". Unlike American hijack films like Executive Decision (1996), which are supposed to be suspenseful throughout, Payanam also included comedic sequences.

== Music ==
Pravin Mani, who assists A. R. Rahman in Nagarjuna's Tamil debut Ratchagan (1997), was assigned as the film composer and worked on the film's background score. The film would include only one solo song, which was composed by Pravin and was written by Vairamuthu's son Madhan Karky. According to the director: Payanam "is a different film, a very character-oriented film with no songs". Nagarjuna attributed the film's lack of songs to Indian cinema's attempt to replicate Hollywood.

Tamil Tracklist
No.	Title	Lyrics	Singer(s)	Length
1.	"Payanam"	Madhan Karky	Pradeep Vijay; Backing Vocals: Benny Dayal, Suvi Suresh, Ranina Reddy, Shakthisree Gopalan	3:15
Total length:				3:15

Telugu Tracklist
No.	Title	Lyrics	Singer(s)	Length
1.	"Gaganam"	Suddala Ashok Teja	Vijay Prakash	3:17
Total length:				3:17

== Reception ==
=== Tamil version ===
Pavithra Srinivasan of Rediff.com rated Payanam 3.5 out of 5 and stated: "The sequences are logical, even while allowing for dashes of humour, soul-searching, and feel-good factors; the whole setting has a realistic feel that draws you in". Rangan wrote, "The film is brisk and never boring. But its biggest achievement may be in proving that it is possible to sneak various genres past the barbed-wire boundaries of Tamil cinema". A critic from Sify.com stated: "The film's supporting cast is what makes it work. On the whole, Radha Mohan's Payanam is an enjoyable ride." Chennai Online praised the attempt to insert comedy in the action sequences, saying; "A big plus is a comedy in the script with the various characters from all backgrounds from a star to an astrologer, all thrown together in the aircraft". The Hindu noted; "The film grabs audience attention from the word go – you're worried about the plight of the passengers one minute, chuckling the very next at the wry humour, and before long, gripped by the suspense". The reviewer also praised the art director, stating: "The aircraft and airport are apparently a set. Really? Art director Kathir, take a bow!" and also said; "As the end credits roll, you only wish there had been a Major Raveendran who had his way in December 1999 at Amritsar". A critic from The Times of India gave a score of 2.5 out of 5 and said; "Radhamohan's Payanam would have been a more engaging watch only if the journey was a littler shorter". A critic from The New Indian Express wrote, "Rarely has a flight-hijack drama been presented on the Indian screen. There are rare ones like the recent Malayalam release Khandahar inspired by a real-life incident. So, Payanam a bilingual (Tamil, Telugu) centered on a hijack-plot, comes as a welcome change".

=== Telugu version ===
Radhika Rajamani of Rediff.com wrote: "Director Radhamohan has crafted a brilliant hijack drama in Gaganam. The film is filled with suspense and thrills and laced occasionally with humour." Jeevi of Idlebrain.com called Gaganam "a decent film which should be watched with an open mind". A critic from The New Indian Express called Gaganam "a must watch".

== Accolades ==
Award	Category	Recipient(s) and nominee(s)	Result	Ref.
Norway Tamil Film Festival Awards	Best Director	Radha Mohan	Won	
Norway Tamil Film Festival Awards	People's Choice	Payanam	Won	
Tamil Nadu State Film Awards	Tamil Nadu State Film Award for Best Script Writer	Radha Mohan	Won	
