= Duet Movies =

Indian film production and distribution company

Duet Movies aka Prakash Raj Productions is an Indian film production and distribution company based in Chennai, Tamil Nadu, and owned by actor Prakash Raj. The company was established in 1999 with their first production venture being Anthapuram.

In 2001, Prakash Raj changed the company's name from Duet Cinema to Duet Movies for numerological reasons. It was changed as Silent Movies in Payanam and later changed as Prakash Raj Productions.

== Filmography ==
Year	Film	Language	Director	Synopsis	Notes
1999	Anthapuram	Telugu	Krishna Vamsi	A girl who arrives to her husband's village with him and child gets embroiled in faction	
1999	Anthapuram	Tamil	Krishna Vamsi	A girl who arrives to her husband's village with him and child gets embroiled in faction	
2002	Dhaya	Tamil	Senthilnathan		
2003	Naam	Tamil	Sabapathy Dekshinamurthy		
2004	Azhagiya Theeye	Tamil	Radha Mohan	The girl who wants to escape from forced marriage arranged by her father lies to her fiancé that she's married	
2005	Kanda Naal Mudhal	Tamil	V. Priya	A boy and girl who hate the sight of each other later fall in love	
2006	Poi	Tamil	K. Balachander		
2007	Mozhi	Tamil	Radhamohan	Karthik, a musician falls in love with Archana, speech hearing impaired girl however she rejects him due to her past fearing it would happen to her too	
2008	Velli Thirai	Tamil	Viji	A struggling actor steals the script of his friend and becomes a star	
2008	Abhiyum Naanum	Tamil	Radhamohan	The film revolves around the relationship between father and his daughter	
2010	Inidhu Inidhu	Tamil	K. V. Guhan		
2010	Naanu Nanna Kanasu	Kannada	Prakashraj		Directorial Debut, Kannada remake of Abhiyum Naanum
2011	Payanam	Tamil	Radhamohan		
2012	Dhoni	Tamil	Prakashraj	Fourteen-year-old Kartik is passionate about cricket and considers cricketer Dhoni as his idol. But his father does not approve of it and wants him to pursue an MBA degree instead.	
2012	Dhoni	Telugu	Prakashraj	Fourteen-year-old Kartik is passionate about cricket and considers cricketer Dhoni as his idol. But his father does not approve of it and wants him to pursue an MBA degree instead.	
2012	Mayilu	Tamil	M. Jeevan		
2013	Gouravam	Tamil	Radhamohan		
2013	Gouravam	Telugu	Radhamohan		
2014	Un Samayal Arayil	Tamil	Prakashraj		
2014	Ulavacharu Biryani	Telugu	Prakashraj		
2014	Oggarane	Kannada	Prakashraj		
2016	Manavoori Ramayanam	Telugu	Prakashraj		
2016	Idolle Ramayana	Kannada	Prakashraj		
