= Ashwin (actor, born 1987) =

Indian actor

- Born: Ashwin Kumar; 30 August 1987
- Other name: Aswin
- Occupation: Actor
- Years active: 1994; 1997; 2009—present
- Relatives: K. A. Thangavelu (grandfather)

Ashwin Kumar is an Indian television and film actor. He is the grandson of K. A. Thangavelu. After beginning his career as a child artist, he has worked on series including Thamarai, Lakshmi Kalyanam and Tamil Selvi.

== Career ==
In 2012, Ashwin finished working on a coming-of-age film titled Hi Da directed by Brindha Das, which had music composed by Vishal Chandrasekhar. Though the soundtrack and an official trailer were released, the film did not have a theatrical release. He then appeared in Radha Mohan's bilingual film Gouravam (2013), in both the Tamil and Telugu versions. In early 2013, he completed a film titled Ayul Regai Neeyadi, where he worked alongside a new technical team. Despite having an audio launch event, the film also failed to have a theatrical release. Vijay Sekar's Kaathal Kasakkuthaiya was also completed but unreleased. Another film titled Kalaintha Kanavugal by director Kabilan, examining the relationship between parents and their children, also failed to be completed. In 2013, Ashwin worked in the lead role in Rasu Jaganathan's Saranalayam co-starring actress Sri Priyanka. Upon completion, the film failed to find distributors and remained unreleased for five years. It later had a low-profile release across Tamil Nadu in February 2018, with a reviewer from Iflicks.com noting, "Ashwin Kumar plays the protagonist and has done a decent job".

Ashwin has enjoyed more success in television. His most high-profile work to date has been appearances in the lead role in the serials Thamarai and Kula Deivam since 2014 and 2015, respectively. In early 2017, he began work on the television serial Lakshmi Kalyanam as Kalyan, one of the lead roles.

== Filmography ==
- Note: all films are in Tamil, unless otherwise noted.

Year	Film	Role	Notes
1994	Periya Marudhu		Child artist
1997	Samrat		Child artist
2013	Gouravam		Bilingual film
2018	Saranalayam		

== Television ==
Year	Title	Role	Channel
2009–2012	Chellamay	Maniyarasu	Sun TV
2014	10 Mani Kathaigal	Man in Opposite House	Sun TV
2014–2018	Thamarai	Dwarakesh	Sun TV
2017–2018	Kula Deivam	Arjun	Sun TV
2017	Lakshmi Kalyanam	Kalyaan	Vijay TV
2017	Neeli	Sathya	Vijay TV
2017–2019	Azhagiya Tamil Magal	Gowtham	Zee Tamil
2018	Sumangali	Selvam	Sun TV
2019	Tamil Selvi	Amudhan	Sun TV
2020–2022	Chithi 2	Anbu	Sun TV
2022	Chandralekha	Sabarinathan	Sun TV
2024–2025	Ranjani	Madhavan	Sun TV
2025–Present	Malli	Pathram Babu	Sun TV
