= Ashwin Kumar =

Ashwin Kumar is an Indian name and may refer to:

- Ashvin Kumar, Indian filmmaker
- Ashwin Kkumar, Malayalam and Tamil film actor
- Ashwin (actor, born 1987), Tamil television actor
- Ashwin Kumar Lakshmikanthan (born 1991), Tamil/Telugu actor
