= Periya Marudhu (film) =

- Poster
- Directed by: N. K. Viswanathan
- Screenplay by: Sangili Murugan
- Story by: K. Ayya
- Produced by: Kalyani Murugan
- Starring: Vijayakanth; Ranjitha; Pragathi
- Cinematography: N. K. Viswanathan
- Edited by: Ganesh Kumar
- Music by: Ilaiyaraaja
- Production company: Meenakshi Arts
- Release date: 2 November 1994
- Running time: 145 minutes
- Country: India
- Language: Tamil

Periya Marudhu is a 1994 Indian Tamil-language action film directed by N. K. Viswanathan. The film stars Vijayakanth, Ranjitha and Pragathi. It was released on 2 November 1994.

== Plot ==
Periya Marudhu amputated Marimuthu for grabbing his land and he is sent to jail. After spending two years behind bars, Periya Marudhu is back to his village.

In the past, Periya Marudhu became an orphan at a very early age and tried hard to live through. Impressed by Periya Marudhu's strength, Sivasankaran brought him to his home. Since then, Periya Marudhu considers Sivasankaran as his best friend and works as his faithful henchman while Sivasankaran considers him as his common henchman. Sivasankaran is involved in land grabbing, in women kidnapping and raping. The villagers hate Sivasankaran and Periya Marudhu.

After losing her sister, Kaveri decides to live with Periya Marudhu, her last relative. Kaveri loves Periya Marudhu and tries to change his behaviour. Sivasankaran, who fears to lose his faithful henchman, kills Kaveri.

Periya Marudhu decides to take revenge and becomes a good man.

== Cast ==
- Vijayakanth as Periya Marudhu
- Ranjitha as Kaveri
- Pragathi as Ponni
- Mahesh Anand as Sivasankaran
- M. N. Nambiar as Bhai
- Pandiyan as Pandiyan
- Thalaivasal Vijay as Marimuthu
- Goundamani as Sodalai
- Senthil as Azhaguraman
- S. S. Chandran as S. Satyamurthy
- Ponnambalam as Senkodan
- Peeli Sivam as Police Inspector
- C. R. Vijayakumari as Periya Marudhu's mother
- Gandhimathi
- Karuppu Subbiah
- Kallapart Natarajan as coracle driver
- Ram
- Lakshman
- Sangili Murugan as Periya Marudhu's father
- K. A. Thangavelu
- M. Saroja
- V. Gopalakrishnan as Jailer
- Aradhana as Mahalakshmi
- Jayalalita as Sevvanthi
- Kullamani as Perichali
- Omakuchi Narasimhan
- Idichapuli Selvaraj as Restaurant Owner
- Ganapathy Subramaniam
- Ashwin Kumar
- Kavithasri as an item number

== Soundtrack ==
The soundtrack was composed by Ilaiyaraaja.

Song	Singer(s)	lyricist	Duration
"Aalamara Vehru"	T. L. Maharajan, S. N. Surendar	Vaali	3:46
"Elaarukkum Nalla"	Jayachandran	Vaali	1:54
"Ponnu Velayara"	Mano, K. S. Chithra	Pulamaipithan	4:22
"Poonthearil Yeri"	T. L. Maharajan, S. N. Surendar	Muthulingam	5:20
"Raasavukku"	Mano, K. S. Chithra	Vaali	3:24
"Sinagarama Nalla"	Uma Ramanan	Ponnadiyan	4:57
"Vidala Pulla"	Swarnalatha	Muthulingam	5:09
"Sakara Dappa"	K.S.Chitra	Muthulingam	5:09

== Critical reception ==
The Indian Express wrote, "The screenplay is loosely etched and treatment leaves much to be desired". Thulasi of Kalki called comedy and dialogues as okay while calling music and cinematography as enjoyable and concluded that if one was an action lover, this film is for them.
