= Un Samayal Arayil =

2014 Indian film by Prakash Raj

- Theatrical release poster of the Tamil version
- Directed by: Prakash Raj
- Dialogue by: Tamil: Viji; T. J. Gnanavel; Kannada/Telugu: Prakash Raj; Aravind Kuplikar; Ramana Gopisetti
- Screenplay by: Prakash Raj
- Story by: Syam Pushkaran; Dileesh Nair
- Based on: Salt N' Pepper by Aashiq Abu
- Produced by: Prakash Raj; Vallabha (Telugu)
- Starring: Prakash Raj; Sneha; Urvashi
- Cinematography: Preetha Jayaraman
- Edited by: Kishore Te.
- Music by: Ilaiyaraaja
- Production companies: Prakash Raj Productions; Creative Commercials (Telugu)
- Distributed by: Prakash Raj Productions (Tamil); Thoogudeepa Distributors (Kannada); Sri Venkateswara Creations (Telugu)
- Release date: 6 June 2014
- Country: India
- Languages: Tamil; Kannada; Telugu

Un Samayal Arayil in Tamil (transl. In your kitchen), Oggarane in Kannada (transl. Tempering) and Ulavacharu Biryani in Telugu, is a 2014 Indian romantic comedy film directed by Prakash Raj. A remake of Aashiq Abu's 2011 Malayalam film Salt N' Pepper, the film is simultaneously shot in three languages. It stars Prakash Raj alongside Sneha, Urvashi, Tejus and Samyukta Hornad. The film features the original score and soundtrack by Ilaiyaraja. The regular shoot commenced from 26 September at Mysore. The film's Tamil title is based on a song from Dhill (2001).

The film was released on 6 June 2014 to mixed reviews in Telugu and Tamil while the Kannada version received positive reviews. The Tamil and the Telugu versions were unsuccessful at the box office, while the Kannada version became a major success.

== Plot ==
Kalidas works in the state archaeological department and is a food lover, he is 45 years old and remains unmarried. His only companion is his cook, Krishna. Naveen is Kalidas's nephew who comes to stay with him while looking for a job. Kalidas has a normal life until he gets a misdialed phone call from Gowri, a dubbing artiste living with her friend Meghana. Gowri rings to order a dosa from a restaurant but gets Kalidas instead. Their conversations do not go well at first, but a long-distance romance develops due to their common interest—cooking and food. Kalidas is a born gourmet while Gowri is indulging in culinary activities in memory of her deceased mother. Kalidas starts to let Gowri into the secrets of baking with a multi-layered cake called "Joan's Rainbow".

Kalidas and Gowri both get the jitters before their first face-to-face meeting, as each becomes conscious of their own physical appearances, and both decide to send younger and better-looking substitutes instead, Naveen and Meghana. When they meet, neither Naveen nor Meghana realizes that the other person is a substitute, since they introduce themselves as Kalidas and Gowri respectively. Naveen thinks that Kalidas is actually in love with Meghana while Meghana thinks that Gowri is in love with Naveen. They attempt to sabotage their older counterpart's relationship by telling Kalidas and Gowri respectively that the person they met would be unsuitable for them due to huge age differences and personality types. Kalidas and Gowri try to forget each other and end up feeling sad for a long duration of the movie. Finally, Kalidas gives in to his loneliness and calls up Gowri and they both decide to meet face-to-face. Both of them decide to meet each other honestly to get it over with. Naveen and Meghana, who by this time had started to develop feelings for each other, are confused and worried upon hearing this as they are afraid their true identity will be revealed to the other person. Naveen finally admits to Meghana that he is not the real Kalidas and Meghana too explains her side of the story. They both realize the confusion and call Kalidas to apologize and narrate all the incidents unknown to them. Kalidas and Gowri finally meet each other at the planned museum and their relationship begins.

== Cast ==
| Tamil version | Kannada version | Telugu version | Role |
|---|---|---|---|
| Prakash Raj | | | Kalidas (Note: His full name is M. Kalidasan, M. Kalidasa, and M. Kalidasu in Telugu, respectively.) |
| Sneha | | | Gowri |
| Tejus | | | Naveen |
| Samyukta Hornad | | | Meghana |
| Aishwarya | | | Asha |
| Urvashi | | | Chechi, beautician |
| Shivajirao Jadhav | | | Sneha's boss |
| Sanchari Vijay | | | Rama |
| Elango Kumaravel | Mandya Ramesh | M. S. Narayana | Kalidas's uncle |
| Thambi Ramaiah | Achyuth Kumar | Brahmaji | Krishna |
| Parasuram | | | Jaakayya |
| Sumuka | | | Karthik |
| Shivajirao Jadav | | | Director |
| Mahendra Ramesh | | | Vaidhi |

== Production ==
Prakash bought the remake rights of the film Salt N' Pepper. It is a romantic story between two couples who accidentally get to know each other through their common love for food. Besides directing the film, Prakash Raj has also acted in and produced the film. Tabu was initially roped in to play the lead female role, but was dropped out. Sneha signed the film later as a leading lady, playing Shwetha Menon's role from the original. In May 2013, Prakash acknowledged that he would be directing Sneha in his upcoming venture on an episode of Neengalum Vellalam Oru Kodi that featured her and her husband Prasanna. Saymukta Hornad, daughter of popular Kannada actor Sudha Belawadi was cast for a role in the film and said that she was taking Telugu and Tamil lessons as she would be part of all three versions too. A newcomer, Tejus, was selected by Prakash to play the role of Naveen, the love interest of Samyukta Hornad's character. All the songs in the film are choreographed by Bollywood's popular choreographer and Prakash's wife Pony Verma Prakash Rai, who also debuted as an associate director with this film.

== Soundtrack ==
Oggarane Ulavucharu Biriyani Un Samayal Arayil

Soundtrack album by Ilaiyaraaja
- Released: 4 April 2014 (Kannada); 31 March 2014 (Telugu); 14 April 2014 (Tamil)
- Genre: Feature film soundtrack
- Length: 18:01
- Label: Junglee Music
- Producer: Ilaiyaraaja

Ilaiyaraaja chronology
| Oru Oorla (2014) | Oggarane; Ulavucharu Biriyani; Un Samayal Arayil (2014) | Drishya (2014) |

Tamil Soundtrack

All lyrics are written by Palani Bharathi.

| No. | Title | Singer(s) | Length |
|---|---|---|---|
| 1. | "Indha Porapudhan" | Kailash Kher | 4:17 |
| 2. | "Eeramai Eeramai" | Vibhavari Apte Joshi, Ranjith | 5:29 |
| 3. | "Therintho Theriyamalo" | Karthik, Ramya NSK | 4:55 |
| 4. | "Kaatru Veliyil" | Ilaiyaraaja | 3:26 |

Kannada Soundtrack

All lyrics are written by Jayant Kaikini.

| No. | Title | Singer(s) | Length |
|---|---|---|---|
| 1. | "Ee Janumave Ahaa" | Kailash Kher | 4:15 |
| 2. | "Gaaliyaa Maatali" | Vibhavari Apte Joshi, Ranjith | 5:27 |
| 3. | "Manadi Belagaayite" | Karthik, Ramya NSK | 4:53 |
| 4. | "Bareyada Saalanu" | Sharreth | 3:26 |

Telugu Soundtrack

All lyrics are written by Chandrabose.

| No. | Title | Singer(s) | Length |
|---|---|---|---|
| 1. | "Ee Janmame Ruchi" | Kailash Kher | 4:13 |
| 2. | "Theeyaga Theeyaga" | Vibhavari Apte Joshi, Ranjith | 5:24 |
| 3. | "Thelisee Theliyandila" | Karthik, Ramya NSK | 4:55 |
| 4. | "Raayaleni Lekhane" | Sharreth | 3:20 |

== Critical reception ==
=== Un Samayal Arayil ===
Baradwaj Rangan from The Hindu wrote, "The problem, primarily, is one of tone. It becomes increasingly hard to figure out whether the film is a light comedy of errors or a more serious meditation on what Kalidasa eventually calls an “inferiority complex”... There's no sense of consequence, nothing at stake. As a result, Un Samayalarayil ends up half-baked". The Times of India gave it 3 stars out of 5 and wrote, "this film is like a nutritious meal that not only fills your stomach but also leaves your taste buds tingling". Deccan Chronicle gave 2.5 stars out of 5 and wrote, "Despite a wafer thin story, while the first half is engaging, post interval it drags as it deviates from the main story to uninteresting extraneous subplots...In spite of its shortcoming, the movie is fairly engaging". Rediff gave the film 3 out of 5 stars and wrote, "Un Samayal Arayil a thoroughly enjoyable light romantic comedy", calling it "refreshingly different and definitely worth watching". Hindustan Times wrote, "Somehow, food begins to fade out of the plot, rendering the title a trifle imprecise, and the escapades of the younger couple hog much of the screen time post intermission. This is a classic pitfall of Indian movies which get too ambitious filling their plates with more than what they can digest". Sify wrote, "It tries to weaves together taste, flavour and love but due to a wafer thin script drags, especially the second half". IANS gave 2 stars out of 5 and wrote, "Prakash Raj attempts to cook a love story with all the wrong ingredients that makes his final product avoidable. Un Samayal Arayil...also boasts a potential story, but misses the charm of the original that swept the audiences off their feet. The film does have its moments, but not enough to make you root for it".

=== Oggarane ===
The Times Of India gave it a 4 out of 5 stars and wrote, "Director-cum-hero Prakash Raj is brilliant in his narration; the lively dialogues (Aravind Kuplikar and Prakash Rai) rev up the performances. Don't be surprised if you get the feeling that you are part of the story. Thrills, emotions, suspense, comedy, romance and sentiments — it's a powerpack that will keep you gleefully glued till the end. Prakash Rai is brilliant with his expression, voice modulation and body language. A pretty Sneha infuses life into her girl-next-door image. This dosa-induced love story promises to leave a good taste in your mind". Deccan Chronicle wrote, "Oggarane is a Must Watch For Prakash's Brilliance". The New Indian Express wrote, "If the way to a man's heart is through his stomach, then Oggarane satiates all the senses...The film strikes a chord and is generously sprinkled with the spice of life, which also evokes an emotional response". Bangalore Mirror gave 3.5 stars out of 5 and wrote, "Prakash Rai as the director handles his platter perfectly. He polishes the rough edges of the original and what you have is a connoisseur's delight". The Hindu wrote, "Prakash Rai has proved his mettle again with Oggarane. The film...doesn’t disappoint".

=== Ulavacharu Biryani ===
Deccan Chronicle wrote, "Prakash Raj has chosen a good subject, which has a great blend of romance, relationship and food. The problem with the film, however, is slow narration and it drags a bit...At best, Ulavacharu Biryani is a good “time pass” film". The Times of India gave 3 stars out of 5 and wrote, "what could have ideally been a heart-warming romance ends up as an unintended comedy of errors...One does get the impression that an important ingredient is missing in this remake that seems to have lost some of its original magic as the filmmaker tried to tailor it to the Telugu palette". Sify wrote, "Though this film has all the right ingredients, the recipe (read storyline) is not good enough. A better preparation would have made a lot of difference. With performers like Prakash Raj and Sneha, and music by Ilayaraja, this film doesn’t pass muster".
