= Lakshmi Kalyanam (TV series) =

Indian Tamil-language soap opera

- English: Lakshmi Wedding
- Genre: Soap opera
- Written by: Natraj Jegan
- Screenplay by: Arunmohan (dialogue)
- Directed by: A. R. Ramesh
- Starring: Yuvarani; Deepika; Sathiya Sai; Ashwin Kumar; Shyam
- Music by: Johnson.A
- Country of origin: India
- Original language: Tamil
- No. of episodes: 98

Production
- Editor: Jones
- Camera setup: Multi-camera
- Running time: approx. 22–24 minutes per episode

Original release
- Network: Vijay TV
- Release: 7 February – 23 June 2017

Lakshmi Kalyanam (transl. Lakshmi Wedding) is an Indian Tamil-language soap opera starring Yuvarani, Deepika, Sathiya Sai, Ashwin Kumar and Shyam. It is a remake of the Telugu-language television series of the same title which has aired on Maa TV from 2016. It was broadcast on Vijay TV on Monday to Friday from 7 February 2017 to 23 June 2017 at 21:30 (IST) for 98 Episodes. It replaced Kalyanam Mudhal Kadhal Varai.

== Synopsis ==
It is a story about two sisters Lakshmi and Swathi who lost their mother early in their life. Lakshmi looks after her sister and runs an embroidery store to support the family and fund Swathi's education but, after she makes a big sacrifice for Swathi, there are consequences for them all.

== Cast ==
- Deepika as Lakshmi
- Sathiya Sai as Swati
- Yuvarani as Rajeshwari
- Ashwin Kumar as Kalyan
- Shyam as Ajay
- Kumaresan as Moorthi
- VJ Mounika as Varsha
- Madhu Mohan

== Development ==
On 17 January 2017, the first promotion film for the show, titled "Childhood" was released by Vijay TV on YouTube. On 21 February 2017, the second, third and fourth promotion films, titled "Young Age" were released by Vijay TV.

== Adaptations ==
Language	Title	Original release	Network(s)	Last aired	Notes
Telugu	Lakshmi Kalyanam లక్ష్మీ కళ్యాణం	7 November 2016	Star Maa	10 October 2020	Original
Tamil	Lakshmi Kalyanam லட்சுமி கல்யாணம்	7 February 2017	Star Vijay	23 June 2017	Remake
Kannada	Sindhoora ಸಿಂಧೂರ	20 March 2017	Star Suvarna	23 April 2020	Remake
Bengali	Mayar Badhon মায়ার বাঁধন	29 May 2017	Star Jalsha	17 June 2018	Remake
Hindi	Jiji Maa जीजी माँ	9 October 2017	Star Bharat	18 February 2019	Remake
Malayalam	Seetha Kalyanam സീതാകല്യാണം	10 September 2018	Asianet	10 September 2021	Remake
