= Perarasu (film) =

- Poster
- Directed by: Udhayan
- Written by: Udhayan
- Produced by: Kaja Mohideen
- Starring: Vijayakanth; Debina Bonnerjee
- Cinematography: M. V. Panneerselvam
- Edited by: Anil Malnad
- Music by: Pravin Mani
- Production company: Roja Combines
- Release date: 14 September 2006
- Running time: 150 minutes
- Country: India
- Language: Tamil

Perarasu (transl. Kingdom) is a 2006 Indian Tamil-language vigilante action film directed by Udhayan in his debut. The film stars Vijayakanth in the main dual lead role, alongside Debina Bonnerjee, Prakash Raj, Sarath Babu, Anandaraj and Pandiarajan. The music is composed by Pravin Mani. The film was released on 14 September 2006.

== Plot ==
CBI officer Kasi Viswanathan is entrusted to investigate the mysterious disappearance of Judge Sadhasivam. The Kasi Viswanathan team comprises junior officer DCP Kesavan Nair IPS and a head constable Kandhasamy.

Soon Kasi finds out that a state minister Ilakkiyan is behind all crimes in the city, and he is assisted by three senior cops. Suddenly, one by one, the bad cops are killed, with needle of suspicion resting on Kasi, as a lookalike is behind the murders. It is revealed that it is a revenge killing by Perarasu Pandiyan, Kasi's twin brother, and that Kasi's birth name is Ilavarasu Pandiyan.

We are told in a flashback by the family retainer Maarimuthu that Kasi was the long-lost twin brother of Perarasu Ilavarasu Pandiyan, and their father, the local chieftain Chakkaravarthi Pandiyan, was at one time the kingmaker of Panchalankurichi. After making Sivapprakasam and Ilakkiyan MLAs, he falls out with them and they murder him. Perarasu, who has seen this murder, now wants to take revenge.

In the end, Perarasu fits a bomb on a chair in a meeting on which Ilakkiyan sits. Kasi, desperate to save Ilakkiyan, goes into the room and prefers to die with Ilakkiyan. Perarasu feeling proud for his brother preferring to give up his life for his duty, saves both of them, but is shot by Ilakkiyan. Kasi then shoots Ilakkiyan, and Perarasu takes the blame before dying. The film ends with Kasi returning to become the next chieftain of his native village.

== Cast ==
- Vijayakanth in a dual role as Ilavarasu Pandiyan (Kasi Viswanathan IPS in CBI) and Perarasu Pandiyan
- Debina Bonnerjee as Aishwarya
- Prakash Raj as Ilakkiyan
- Sarath Babu as Chakkaravarthi Pandiyan
- Anandaraj as DCP Kesavan Nair IPS
- Pandiarajan as Kandhasamy
- Nassar as Sadhasivam
- Mansoor Ali Khan as Sivaprakasam
- Chandrasekhar as Marimuthu
- Riyaz Khan as "Vannarapettai" Kabali/ CBI officer Vetriselvan (Fake)
- Ajay Rathnam as Inspector Azhagappan
- O. A. K. Sundar as Inspector Shenbagamoorthy
- Sampath Raj as ACP Chidambaranathan
- Chitti Babu as Ilakkiyan's assistant
- LIC Narasimhan as Shop manager
- Ponnambalam as Bullet Mani
- Mahanadi Shankar as Otteri Shankar
- Ragasya as Jasmine
- S. N. Lakshmi as Aishwarya's grandmother
- T. P. Gajendran as Sathyanathan
- Anjali Devi as Sadhasivam's wife
- Srividya as Sadhasivam's daughter
- Sundari as Chidambaranathan's wife
- Bava Lakshmanan as Constable Ravindran
- Muthukaalai as Ayyam Perumal
- Vijay Ganesh as Man at the bus station
- Kovai Senthil as Party member
- Velmurugan as Party member
- Selvakumar as Party member
- Boys Rajan as Bomb disposal technician
- Kandasamy as Elephant owner
- Nitish Veera as Sudesi's helper
- Sregajesh as Sub-inspector
- Shankar as Aishwarya's friend
- Venba as Aishwarya's friend
- Kabir as Aishwarya's friend
- Chandrahassan Jayaprakash as young Perarasu Pandiyan

== Production ==
The film began production in December 2004. The filming was held at Chennai, Pollachi and Benaras while a fight scene was shot at AVM Studios.

== Soundtrack ==
The music was composed by Pravin Mani.

Song	Singers	Length
"Cool Baby Cool"	Shweta Mohan, Srinivas, Pravin Mani, Timmy	04:32
"Pondatiya Nee"	Manikka Vinayagam, Malathy Lakshman	04:10
"Unnai Nambi"	Srinivas	04:16
"Vaada Vaada"	Tippu	03:45
"Vaango Naa"	Shweta Mohan	04:07

== Critical reception ==
Malini Mannath of Chennai Online wrote, "It' a fast-paced entertainer that at times trips and stumbles with loose ends, flaws, and quite a few unanswered questions. But what keeps it going, with not a moment to dwell on the flaws and get distracted, is its racy narrative. The debutant director (with years of experience apprenticing under directors like Maharajan) keeps the action moving rapidly with not a lagging moment". Shyam Balasubramaniam of Rediff.com wrote, "Perarasu is probably worth a watch". Lajjavathi of Kalki praised the Vijayakanth film for giving space for other actors too while praising the sharp dialogues but panned the film for having revenge plot as flashback.
