= S. Sowmya =

Indian vocalist (born 1969)

Sowmya Srinivasan
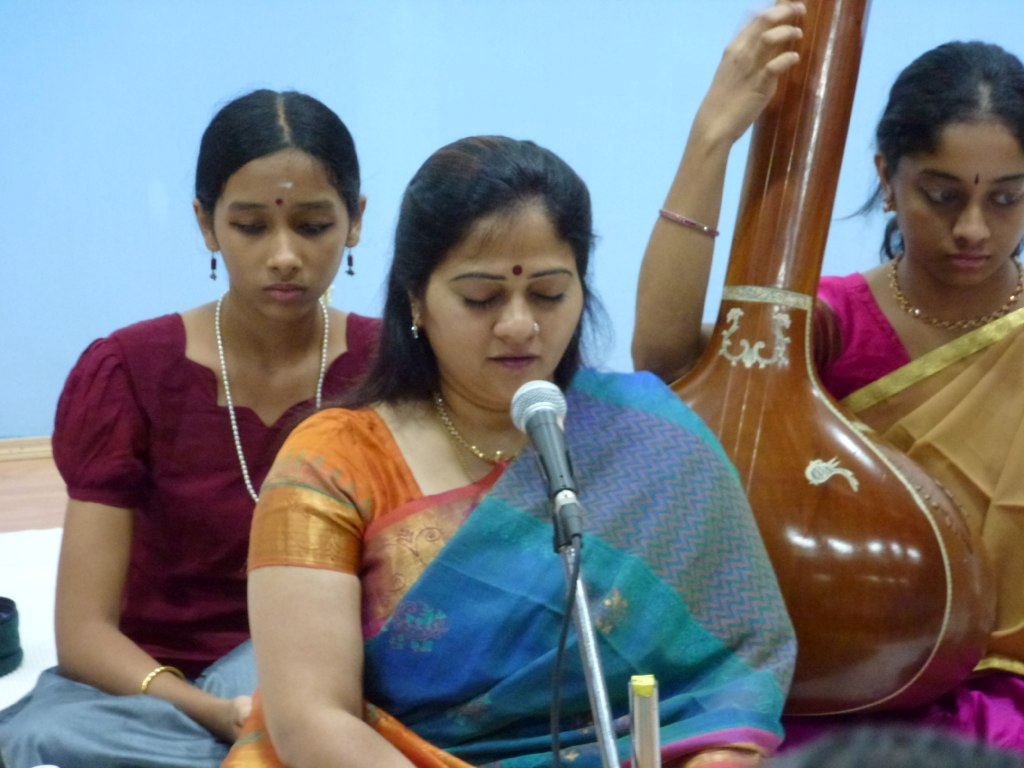

Background information
- Born: 16 April 1969 (age 57)
- Origin: Tamil Nadu, India
- Genre: Carnatic music - Indian Classical Music
- Occupation: Carnatic vocalist

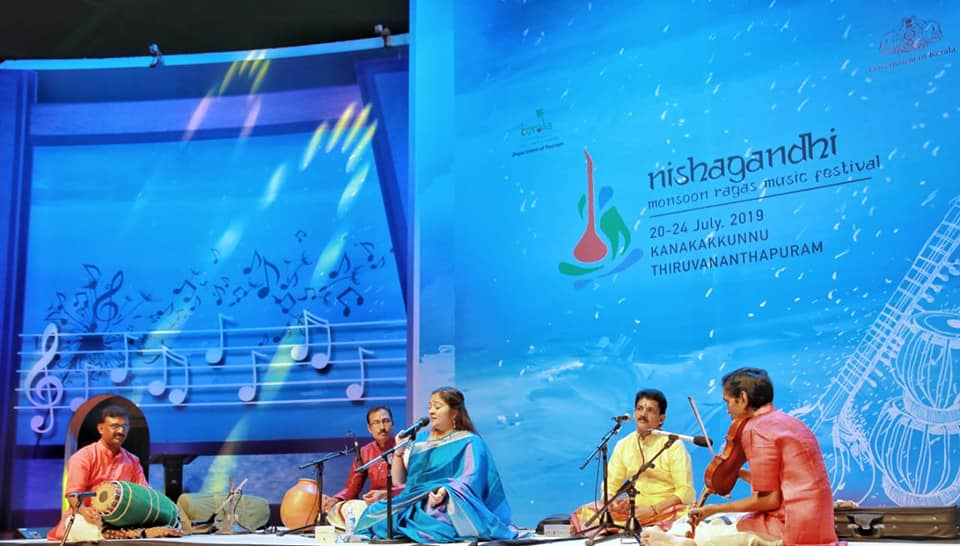
S Sowmya sings at Nishagandhi Music Festival, Trivandrum in 2019. Nagai R Sriram on Violin, Erickavu N. Sunil on Mridangam, Vellattanjoor Sreejith on Ghatom, and Payyannur Govindaprasad on Morsing

S. Sowmya (born 16 April 1969) is a Carnatic music vocalist. She learnt music initially from her father Srinivasan, and later from S. Ramanathan and Smt.T. Muktha. She received the Sangeetha Kalanidhi title by Madras Music Academy in 2019 and the Isai Perarignar by the Tamil Isai Sangam in 2022. She was appointed by the Govt of Tamil Nadu as Vice Chancellor of the Tamil Nadu Dr J Jayalalithaa Music & Fine Arts University on April 8, 2022, for a period of three years.

== Alma mater ==
Soumya has been awarded a Ph.D. from the University of Madras for her research on the physical characteristics of the mridangam. She holds a Master's degree in both Chemistry and Indian Music. She was recognized as a top-ranked scholar at the Indian Institute of Technology, Madras and the University of Madras.

== Musical career ==
Sowmya made her concert debut at the age of 11 at the samadhi of Sadasiva Brahmendra, in Nerur. In 1986, she had her first performance at the Madras Music Academy, aged just 17 and thereafter performed every year for 35 years. She has performed in all major sabhas all over India and has presented her concerts in the United States of America, Canada, United Kingdom, Australia, United Arab Emirates, Germany, France, Singapore, Malaysia, Switzerland, Belgium, New Zealand, Tanzania, Sri Lanka, and various other destinations throughout the world. She made her film debut as an actress in the movie Vaanavil Vaazhkai, which was released on 13 February 2015. Sowmya has appeared as a guest judge in several episodes of Vijay TV's musical reality-talent shows, including seasons 2, 3, and 4 of Airtel Super Singer, and seasons 2, 3, and 4 of Airtel Super Singer Junior. She was a permanent judge in seasons 1 and 2 of Raj TV's Carnatic music reality-talent show, Tanishq Swarna Sangeetham. Sowmya was also a permanent judge in seasons 1 and 2 of Jaya TV's Carnatic music reality-talent show, "Carnatic Music Idol".

In 1998, Sowmya co-founded Carnatica - an institution dedicated to classical music & dance instruction, archival, talent search and other related activities. She also co-authored the first comprehensive reference CD-ROM on Carnatic music, Nadanubhava. She is a visiting professor at the Advanced School of Carnatic Music of the Music Academy Madras. She has served as a member of the academic council of the Tamil Nadu Music & Fine Arts University and a member of the Governing Body of the Kalakshetra Foundation.

== Academical qualifications ==
- B.Sc. in Chemistry (1990): Meenakshi College, University — Second Rank Holder and Gold Medallist.
- M.Sc. in Chemistry (1992): Indian Institute of Technology, Madras (IIT Madras) — Awarded the IITM Blue in 1992 for excellence in academics and cultural activities.
- B.A. in Indian Music (1996): University of Madras — First Rank Holder.
- M.A. in Indian Music (1998): University of Madras — First Rank Holder.
- Ph.D. in Music (2012): University of Madras — Guided by Dr. Premeela Gurumurthy; dissertation titled “A study of the effect of temperature variations on the pitch of a double-headed drum (mridanga)”.
