= Thaali (TV series) =

2019 Indian Telugu language soap opera

- Also known as: Subha Sankalpam
- Genre: Drama family
- Written by: Sishtla Ramprasad (Dialogues)
- Screenplay by: Vision Time India Pvt Ltd.
- Directed by: J N Raju
- Creative director: K V Kiran kumar
- Starring: Varshini Arza; Taruntej; Sravan; Vasudha Kasul
- Theme music composer: Mallik
- Opening theme: "Allantha Doorana"; Sunitha (vocals); Sagar Narayana (lyrics)
- Country of origin: India
- Original language: Telugu
- No. of episodes: 1055

Production
- Producer: Vaidehi Ramamurthy
- Cinematography: Saravanan
- Editor: K Mohammed Thouphik
- Camera setup: Multi-camera
- Running time: 20-22 minutes
- Production company: Vision Time India Pvt Ltd.

Original release
- Network: Gemini TV
- Release: 31 August 2020 – 20 January 2024

Related
- Brundavanam; Matrudevobhava

Thaali (originally Subha Sankalpam) is an Indian Telugu language soap opera premiered on 2 December 2019 airing on Gemini TV every Monday to Saturday and it is available for worldwide streaming on Sun NXT. The serial stars Varshini Arza, Taruntej in leading roles. The storyline of the serial is taken from Tamil television series Tamil Selvi aired on Sun TV, however it has a different narration later.

Originally Subha Sankalpam was started on 2 December 2019. Due to COVID-19, the show was stopped temporarily at episode 98. Later the serial was reshooted the old episodes briefly and renamed as Thaali started airing from 31 August 2020.

== Plot ==
Rama Lakshmi is smart, lovable and innocent girl from extended rural family. She pursues higher studies in the city as the first step to achieve her IAS dream. She mets a girl named Alekhya in the college who is jealous about her achievement in intermediate standard. Alekhya always used to criticize Rama Lakshmi and doing attempts to spoil her goal. Alekhya's brother, Anand loves Rama Lakshmi from first sight. He helps her to learn English as he is trying to get closer. Unexpected turns of events, leads to her marriage with Anand. The story unfolds how Rama Lakshmi gains the love of her husband's hostile family and achieve her goal as well.

== Cast ==
=== Main cast ===
- Varshini Arza as Rama Lakshmi and Meenakshi (dual role)
- Taruntej as Anand, Ramalakshmi's Husband
- Bhoomireddy Venkat as Akash, Anand's friend
- Vasudha as Sandhya and Vindhya (dual role)
- Sravan as Chaitanya, Ramalakshmi's brother in law
- Suresh Rai as Krishna Murthy (Vijay, Anand and Alekhya's father)
- Swarna / Durga devi as Sowbhagya (Vijay, Anand and Alekhya's mother)
- Rajendra as Meenakshi's father
- --- as Sarala devi, Meenakshi's mother
- C.H Krishnaveni as Kousalya Devi (Rama Lakshmi's grand mother)
- Naveen Tej as Vijay (Anand and Alekhya's elder brother)
- Sowjanya as Swapna, Vijay's wife
- Samyuktha as Mahi
- Yashvi Kanakala as Alekhya, Anand's Sister
- Rithu as Avantika
- Pradeep as Dasaratharamayya (Rama Lakshmi's elder father)
- Padma Jayanthi as Kanchana (Rama Lakshmi's elder mother)
- Srinivas Bhogireddy as Kodanda Rammayya (Rama Lakshmi's father)
- Sandhya as Bhavani (Rama Lakshmi's mother)
- Sangeetha as Sangeetha (Rama Lakshmi's Aunt and Chaitanya's mother)
- Abhiram as Sagar (Rama Lakshmi's cousin)
- Indranag as Kalyan Ram, Dasaratharamayya's younger brother
- Madhu Krishnan as Saroja (Kalyan ram's wife)
- Chandu as Kattappa

=== Former cast ===
- Ajay as Anand (Subha Sankalpam)
- Geethanjali as Kousalya Devi, Rama Lakshmi's grand mother (replaced by C.H Krishnaveni)

== Crossover episodes ==
- From 13 September 2021 to 14 September 2021 in episodes 321 to 322, Thaali had a crossover with Ala Venkatapuramlo serial.

== Adaptations ==
Language	Title	Original release	Network(s)	Last aired	Notes
Tamil	Tamil Selvi	3 June 2019	Sun TV	31 March 2020	Original
Telugu	Thaali	2 December 2019	Gemini TV	20 January 2024	Remake
