= Tanishq Swarna Sangeetham =

- Genre: Carnatic music, Reality
- Presented by: Mathangi Jagdish (2012), Anuja Iyer (2013) and Sree Chitra (2014)
- Judges: Papanasam Ashok Ramani and Nithyasree Mahadevan
- Country of origin: India
- Original language: Tamil
- No. of seasons: 3

Production
- Production locations: Tamil Nadu, India
- Running time: 1 hour

Original release
- Network: Raj TV
- Release: 2012 – 2014

Tanishq Swarna Sangeetham (Karnaataka Sangeethathin Thanga Kuralukkaana Thedal) is a reality-based Indian singing competition in Tamil language that is being aired on Raj TV. The program seeks to discover the best singing talent in the Carnatic music genre, through a series of statewide auditions in South India. The contest is run for youngsters between the age group 15–23. The show is sponsored by the diamond and gold jewellery store, Tanishq, and the winner of the show is awarded 5 lakh rupees worth of jewellery from Tanishq. The show completed three seasons after its debut in 2012.

Permanent judges for the talent in season 3 are eminent vocalists Papanasam Ashok Ramani and Nithyasree Mahadevan. Guest judges who appeared in season 3 include other eminent vocalists such as M. Balamuralikrishna, Sudha Raghunathan, S. Sowmya, G. V. Prakash, Shakthisree Gopalan, and others. The show aired on weekends between 9:30pm and 10:30pm, and re-runs are telecast between 9:30am and 10:30am.

== Season 3 ==
=== Debut (season 1 and 2 recall series) ===
==== "Diamonds in the Crown" (Episode 1) ====
- Compere: Sreechitra
- Performances:

This episode telecast performances from previous seasons of the show where then-contestants sang compositions of the Trinity of Carnatic Music, Papanasam Sivan, and Subramania Bharathiyar.

Order	Former Contestant	Song	Raga	Tala	Composer
1	Ashwath Narayanan	"Thyagarajaya Namaste"	Begada	Rupakam	Muthuswamy Dikshitar
2	Apoorva Ravindran	"Shri Dhum Dhurge"	Sriranjani	Adi	Muthuswamy Dikshitar
3	Venkata Nagarajan	"Shri Naaradha"	Kanada	Rupakam	Muthuswamy Dikshitar
4	Ashwath Narayanan	Excerpt from "Piravaa Varam"	Lathangki	Adi	Papanasam Sivan
5	Rathipriya	"Chitham Irangaadhaa" (preceded by short alapana)	Sahana	Misrachapu	Papanasam Sivan
6	Janani Iyer	"Sendhil Andavan" (preceded by short alapana)	Kharaharapriya	Rupakam	Papanasam Sivan
7	Adithyanarayan	"Nalla Kaalam Varugudhu"	Malayamarutham	Adi	Subramania Bharathiyar
8	Ashwath Narayanan	"Vandhe Maatharam"	Ragamalika (Yamankalyani, Brindavanasaranga, Punnagavarali, Sindhubhairavi)	Adi	Subramania Bharathiyar
9	Venkatanagarajan	"Nenju Porukkudhillaiye"	Shubhapanthuvarali	Adi	Subramania Bharathiyar
10	K. P. Nandhini	"Bhooloka Kumaari"	Ranjani	Adi	Subramania Bharathiyar
11	Narayanan	"Yethanai Kodi Inbam"	Jog	Adi	Subramania Bharathiyar
12	Apoorva Ravindran	"Chandhiran Oliyil"	Bhageshri	Rupakam	Subramania Bharathiyar

==== "Golden Ambassadors" (Episode 2) ====
- Compere: Sreechitra
- Performances:

In each season, various prominent celebrity musicians appear on the show as special guest judges These musicians are invited to the show as golden ambassadors of the theme being promoted in each round of the competition. This episode telecast performances by the golden ambassadors in previous seasons of the show.

Order	Golden Ambassador(s)	Song	Raga	Tala	Composer
1	vocalists Priya Sisters	"Maa Ramanan"	Hindolam	Rupakam (2 kalai)	Papanasam Sivan
2	vocalist Mahathi	"Engal Kannamma" (preceded by short Kapi raga alapana)	Ragamalika	Adi	Subramania Bharathiyar
3	vocalist O. S. Arun	"Sundhara" (Bhajan)			
4	vocalist Sudha Raghunathan	"Hari Smarane Maado" (preceded by ughabhoga "Maneyindha Santhosha")	Yamankalyani	Adi	Purandara Dasa
5	vocalist Abhishek Raghuram	"Vellai Thamarai" (preceded by short alapana)	Bhimplas	Adi	Subramania Bharathiyar
6	vocalist Sriram Parthasarathy	"Geetham Sangeetham Swarnasangeetham" (preceded by short alapana & followed by swaras)	Ragamalika		Sriram Parthasarathy
7	vocalist Nithyasree Mahadevan (accompanied on mridangam by Papanasam Ashok Ramani)	"Ardhanaareeswaram" (preceded by short alapana)	Kumudhakriya	Rupakam	Muthuswamy Dikshitar
8	saxophone player Kadri Gopalnath	tanam	Kalyanavasantham	Adi	Kadri Gopalnath
9	vocalists Bombay Sisters	"Oonjal"	Navaroj	Khandachapu	Traditional Hindu wedding song
10	vocalists Ranjani-Gayathri	"Nambi Kettavar"	Hindolam	Adi	Papanasam Sivan
11	vocalist M. Balamuralikrishna (accompanied on mridangam by Papanasam Ashok Ramani)	"Sarigamapadhani Suswara Sangeethame" (preceded by short alapana)	Kalyani	Adi	M. Balamuralikrishna

==== "Experiments with gold" (Episode 3) ====
- Compere: Sreechitra
- Performances:

Although the show started off as an experiment being one of the few reality TV show competitions dedicated to Carnatic music, the show also undertook experiments with other related genres for various rounds during each season of the competition. This episode telecast noteworthy performances by contestants (particularly less trained) who shone in rounds consisting of genres other than Carnatic music, being bhajan round, wedding songs round, fusion round, and Bharatha Natyam round.

Order	Former contestant	Song	Raga	Tala	Composer
1			(not applicable)	Traditional bhajan	
2	Pon Avantharaj	"Rengamma Maaji"	Maand	(not applicable)	Namdev
3	Anantharaman Erode		Shri	Adi	Traditional Hindu wedding song
4	Adithyanarayan	"Govardhana Giridhara"	Darbari	Adi	Narayana Theertha
5	K. P. Nandhini	"Eeshan Enbar"	Kapi	Adi Tisra Nadai	
6	Karthick Narayanan	Thillana	Kadhanakuthuhala	Adi	M. Balamuralikrishna
7	Subashri	Thillana	Dhanashri	Adi	Swathi Thirunal

==== "Ornamental gold" (Episode 4) ====
- Compere: Sreechitra
- Performances:

This episode telecast various excerpts of performances and information regarding six former contestants in earlier seasons of the show: the top three finalists in season 1, and the top three finalists in season 2 of the show.

=== Open audition rounds (episodes 5 to 10) ===
- Compere: Sreechitra

Episode #	Audition City	Open Audition Judges
5	Bangalore, Karnataka	Papanasam Ashok Ramani
5	Hossur, Karnataka	Papanasam Ashok Ramani
6	Salem, Tamil Nadu	Papanasam Ashok Ramani
6	Trichy, Tamil Nadu	Papanasam Ashok Ramani
7	Madurai, Tamil Nadu	Papanasam Ashok Ramani
7	Coimbatore, Tamil Nadu	Papanasam Ashok Ramani
8	Chennai, Tamil Nadu	Nithyasree Mahadevan; Papanasam Ashok Ramani
9	Chennai, Tamil Nadu	Nithyasree Mahadevan; Papanasam Ashok Ramani
10	Chennai, Tamil Nadu	Nithyasree Mahadevan; Papanasam Ashok Ramani

=== Final level audition - top 10 selection ===
- Compere: Sreechitra

50 contestants were selected during the open audition rounds. This round required the contestants to perform what was required by the permanent judges, Nithyasree Mahadevan and Papanasam Ashok Ramani.

==== Freestyle round ====
At the conclusion of this round, the top 10 contestants were selected for the main level competition.

=== Finals ===
==== Trinity Round (episode 15) ====
- Compere: Sreechitra
- Permanent Judges: Nithyasree Mahadevan and Papanasam Ashok Ramani
- Guest Judge & Performer: N. Ravikiran
- Performances:
