= Azhagiya Theeye =

- Poster
- Directed by: Radha Mohan
- Written by: Radha Mohan; Viji (dialogues)
- Produced by: Prakash Raj
- Starring: Prasanna; Navya Nair
- Cinematography: Srinivas
- Edited by: Kasi Viswanathan
- Music by: Ramesh Vinayakam
- Production company: Duet Movies
- Release date: 30 July 2004
- Country: India
- Language: Tamil

Azhagiya Theeye (spelt onscreen as Azhagiye Theeyae) is a 2004 Indian Tamil-language romantic comedy drama film written and directed by Radha Mohan that stars Prasanna and Navya Nair (in her Tamil debut). The film was produced by Prakash Raj, who also made a guest appearance, while Ramesh Vinayakam composed the music. It was released on 30 July 2004, and was a commercial success. The film's name is inspired by the song of the same name from the Tamil-language film Minnale (2001).

== Plot ==
The film opens with Ramesh, a medical representative, sharing his past with his fiancée, Sandhya, during a lunch meeting with their friends before their wedding. Ramesh's friends, Chandran, Gopi aka Chithappa, Moorthy, and Bala, are bachelors living together in a rented house in Kodambakkam, owned by Annachi. They're aspiring filmmakers working as assistant directors to make ends meet, but a film union strike is causing them financial struggles. To survive, Moorthy takes on modeling jobs for minimal pay, and they even work as mascots at MGM Dizzee World. Meanwhile, the friends deceive Annachi into believing they're planning to cast him as the lead actor in their film, just to avoid paying rent.

Nandhini's father, a powerful and intimidating businessman, is determined to marry her off to Aravind, a software engineer based in the United States. However, Nandhini is vehemently opposed to the idea, having developed a strong aversion to marriage and men following her mother's death. She seeks help from Ramesh to escape her predicament. Ramesh turns to Chandran, and he agrees to help Nandhini after seeing her distress. Ramesh motivates Chandran to talk to Aravind about Nandhini's situation. Chandran concocts a plan, telling Aravind that he's in love with Nandhini to stop the marriage. However, Aravind doesn't buy it and shouts at Chandran, foiling his plan. Nandhini too claims that she's in love with Chandran, which convinces Aravind to call off the wedding. But Nandhini's father doesn't give up and finds another prospective groom for her, an illiterate liquor shop owner, much to Nandhini's dismay.

Aravind meets Chandran and Nandhini again, and to maintain the facade, Chandran pretends to be Nandhini's lover. Aravind, believing their act, arranges for their marriage registration. Nandhini asks Chandran to register marry her temporarily to escape her father's plans, and Chandran reluctantly agrees. When Nandhini's family discovers the secret marriage, they attack Nandhini and Chandran, but Aravind intervenes. Nandhini's father severs ties with her, and Aravind offers them shelter in his flat. At a gathering, Chandran spins a dramatic tale of his supposed love for Nandhini, which even shocks their friends. Nandhini reprimands Chandran for taking the lie too far, convincing Aravind of their supposed relationship. For safety reasons, Chandran's friends insist he stay with Nandhini in the flat, despite his initial reluctance.

As they spend more time together, Nandhini and Chandran frequently clash, and Aravind often finds himself caught in the middle of their arguments. After Aravind returns to the United States, Chandran suggests to Nandhini that they focus on being good friends, shedding any tension between them, and living peacefully in the flat until they go their separate ways. He assures her that he won't misbehave, helping Nandhini feel more at ease. Chandran learns that Nandhini misses her puppy. In a comedic mix-up, Chandran and Chithappa end up in a brothel, mistakenly believing it's a place where they can find a puppy. Eventually, they manage to get Nandhini a new furry companion. Chandran continues to support Nandhini by paying her exam fees after she loses the money from selling her mother's chain. To raise the funds, Chandran's friends contribute ₹2000, and he sells his beloved cycle to cover the remaining ₹1000.

Moorthy notices the strong bond between Chandran and Nandhini, joking that they look like a real couple. Although Chandran isn't sure about his feelings, he's hesitant to confess his love. Soon, Chandran realizes he has developed feelings for Nandhini. Tragedy strikes when Moorthy is critically injured in an accident during a serial shoot. As he regains consciousness, he calls out for Nandhini, intending to reveal Chandran's feelings for her. However, before he can convey the message, Moorthy succumbs to his injuries, leaving everyone in shock. Nandhini is puzzled as to why Moorthy called out for her instead of his friends.

Later, Chandran's story is accepted, and a producer offers to produce his first film. Keeping his promise to Moorthy, Chandran decides to confess his love to Nandhini. However, he's taken aback when he discovers that she's landed a job as a systems analyst in Bengaluru and is about to relocate. Before leaving, Nandhini asks Chandran to sign divorce papers, which he hesitantly agrees to. As a token of remembrance, Chandran requests Nandhini to leave behind her footwear, which she agrees to. As Nandhini is about to leave the flat for the last time, she sees Chandran in tears, and her feelings begin to shift. Overwhelmed with emotions, Nandhini realizes her love for Chandran and tearfully hugs him. Just as Ramesh finishes sharing the story of Chandran's past with Sandhya, Chandran, now a successful film director, joins them for lunch with his wife Nandhini by his side.

== Cast ==
- Prasanna as Chandran
- Navya Nair as Nandhini
- Jayavarma as Moorthy
- Kumaravel as Gopi "Chithappa"
- Semmal Bala as Bala
- Harris Moosa as Ramesh
- M. S. Bhaskar as Annachi, house owner
- Pyramid Natarajan as Nandhini's father
- Devadarshini as Sandhya, Ramesh's fiancée
- Thadi Balaji as Shanmugam, restaurant waiter
- Periyar Dasan as Chandran's father
- Premi as Chandran's mother
- Kamalesh PK as Nandhini's brother
- Sharmili as Sarasamma, a procurer
- Prakash Raj in a special appearance as Aravind
- Abbas in a cameo appearance as himself in the song "Dil Mera Loot Liya"
- Rambha in a cameo appearance as herself in the song "Dil Mera Loot Liya"

== Production ==
Radha Mohan began work on his first film Smile Please in 1996, starring Prakash Raj, but the film was shelved. Prakash Raj chose to produce a separate film with the same director and announced the project in July 2003 under the title Koothupattarai, which developed alongside Prakash Raj's other production Naam (2003). Navya Nair signed on to appear in the film during September 2003, which by then had been briefly titled Ellame Drama Thaan. It is her Tamil debut.

== Soundtrack ==
The soundtrack was composed by Ramesh Vinayakam.

Track listing
No.	Title	Singer(s)	Length
1.	"Vizhigalin Aruginil"	Ramesh Vinayakam	5:28
2.	"Ullalae Ullalae"	Devan, Timmy	4:26
3.	"Sandana Poongatrae"	Ramesh Vinayakam, Lavanya	5:08
4.	"Maattikkittenae"	Karthik	5:18
5.	"Dil Mera Loot Liya"	Mathangi, Srinivas	5:10
6.	"Boom" (Theme Music)	Ramesh Vinayakam	1:47
Total length:			27:17

== Critical reception ==
Malathi Rangarajan of The Hindu wrote, "Amidst run of the mill love themes and implausible action, Duet Movies' "Azhagiya Theeyae ... " comes as a whiff of fresh air. With a simple storyline neatly narrated, the film is ably backed by Viji's dialogue. The comic digs, light-hearted barbs, and humorous verbal exchanges in this breezy romantic story keep your spirits enlivened." Sify wrote, "On the whole Azhagiya Theeye is good fun while it lasts." Visual Dasan of Kalki praised the film and director for healthy humor, humorous dialogues, and for making a film different from commercial films. G. Ulaganathan of Deccan Herald wrote, "What is a good film? Azagiya Theeye will provide you the answer. No vulgar dialogues, clean story, good screenplay, no unnecessary fights, no overacting — it has all these and much more to offer". Screen wrote, "With film after film competing to be illogical, Azhagiya Theeye comes as a whiff of fresh air. Director Ratha Mohan should be credited for maintaining a fast-paced narration without resorting to any gimmicks. The climax however looked cliched".
