= Tamil Selvi =

2019 Tamil-language TV series

- Genre: soap opera
- Written by: Guru Sampath Kumar; C.U Muthuselvan; Anuja Prabhanandhan
- Directed by: A. Jawahar; Nambiraja; Dhanush
- Creative director: V. Murali Raman
- Starring: Ashika Gopal Padukone; Sandra Babu; Chaithra Sakkari; Ashwin Kumar; VJ Vijay; Kovai Kamala; Nishma Sabitha; Anand Arunkumar Padmanabhan; Neha Menon
- Theme music composer: Rehan
- Opening theme: "Selvi Tamil Selvi"
- Composer: Hari
- Country of origin: India
- Original language: Tamil
- No. of seasons: 1
- No. of episodes: 247

Production
- Producer: Vaidehi Ramamurthy
- Cinematography: R.K. Venkaiah Raman
- Editors: M.S. Thiyagarajan; C.H. Madhusuda Rao
- Camera setup: Multi-camera
- Running time: 20-25 minutes
- Production companies: Sun Entertainment; Vision Time India Pvt Ltd.

Original release
- Network: Sun TV
- Release: 3 June 2019 – 31 March 2020

Tamil Selvi is a 2019 Tamil-language family soap opera, starring Chaithra Sakkari and V. J. Vijay. Replacing the serial Chandrakumari, it premiered on Sun TV on 3 June 2019 to 31 March 2020 and is produced by Sun Entertainment and Vision Time India Pvt Ltd., and it was directed by Dhanush. The soap opera was ended by the Sun TV Network due to the COVID-19 pandemic.

== Story ==
A Tamil girl named Tamil Selvi (Ashika Gopak Padukone / Sandra Babu / Chaithra Sakkari) is interested in studying and moving from her village to the city. But the two families want her to marry her cousin Saravanan (Arunkumar Padmanabhan). She marries Amudhan (Ashwin Kumar / VJ Vijay) due to unavoidable circumstances. This is the story of how she succeeds in her studies, overcoming the new relationships that refuse to accept her in a house that has broken into both families.

== Cast ==
=== Main ===
- Ashika Gopal Padukone (1–100) and Sandra Babu (101–192) and Chaithra Sakkari (193–247) as TamilSelvi Amudhan (Amudhan's wife)
- Ashwin Kumar(1-46) and VJ Vijay (47-247) as Amudhan (Tamil Selvi's husband)

=== Supporting ===
- Nishma Chengappa as Rudra Saravanan (Selvarani's younger sister, Saravanan's wife)
- Varshika Nayak and Niharikka as Ilakkiya Shiva (Tamil Selvi's college friend, Amudhan's sister and Shiva's Wife)(Main Antagonist)
- Preethi Kumar as Dilruba (Rajarajan's arch-rival) (Main Antagonist)
- Arunkumar Padmanabhan as Saravanan (Tamilselvi's cousin, Rudra's husband)
- Jay Srinivas Kumar as Shiva (Dilruba's brother and Ilakkiya's husband)(Main Antagonist)
- M. J. Shriram and Raja Senthil as Rajarajan (Ilakkiya and Amudhan's father)
- Sabitha Anand as Shenbagavalli Rajarajan (Ilakkiya and Amudhan's mother)
- Manush Manmohan as Aatralarasu (Ilakkiya and Amudhan's brother)
- "Metti Oli" Vanaja as Selvarani (Aatralarasu's wife, Ilakkiya and Amudhan's sister-in-law)(Antagonist)
- Suhasini as Mangayarkarasi (Ilakkiya and Amudhan's aunt)
- A. Sakunthala as Annabharathi (Ilakkiya and Amudhan's grandmother)
- Priya as Rajeshwari (Rajarajan's sister, Dilruba and Shiva's mother)
- Parthan Siva as Velmurugan
- Neha Menon as Mallika (Tamil Selvi's sister)
- Usha Sai as Namitha (Tamil Selvi's college friend)
- VJ Nisha as Neelaveni (Saravanan's sister)
- Vasu Vikram as Shakthivel (Tamil Selvi's uncle)
- Deepa Iyer as Valarmathi (Tamil Selvi's aunt)
- Suresh as Senthil (Shaktivel's son)
- Jeganathan as Thangavel (Tamil Selvi's father)
- Dhakshayini as Venmathi (Tamil Selvi's mother, Shaktivel's sister)
- Kumaresan and Vishwanathan as Vetrivel (Tamil Selvi's uncle, Shaktivel's brother)
- "Meesai" Rajendranath as Palaniswamy (Saravanan's father)
- Raghavi as Palaniammal (Saravanan's mother)
- Kovai Kamala as Tamil Selvi's grandmother
- Dr. Sharmila as Dr Indira (Shenbagavalli's friend)
- Gowthami Vembunathan as Ezhilarasi (Doctor Kamaraj's wife and Amudhan's aunt)
- G. Gnanasambandam as Dr Kamaraj (Amudhan's uncle and Ezhilarasi's husband)
- Avinash Ashok as Muthu (Amudhan's friend)

=== Guests ===
- Meena as Herself (promo)
- Kavya Shastry as Kavya (lawyer)

== Production ==
Tamil Film actress Meena featured in an initial promo of the series before its premiere.

Initially Ashika Gopak Padukone played the lead Tamil Selvi. Soon, she quit and was replaced by Sandra Babu who was again replaced by Chaithira Sakkari.

== Adaptations ==
Language	Title	Original release	Network(s)	Last aired	Notes
Tamil	Tamil Selvi	3 June 2019	Sun TV	31 March 2020	Original
Telugu	Thaali	2 December 2019	Gemini TV	20 January 2024	Remake

== Crossover episodes ==
- From 6 January 2020 – 10 January 2020, Nila had a crossover with Tamil Selvi between 5 episodes (184–188).
