= Aayudham Seivom =

2008 film by Udhayan

- Theatrical release poster
- Directed by: Udhayan
- Written by: Udhayan
- Starring: Sundar C Anjali
- Cinematography: K. S. Selvaraj
- Edited by: Mu. Kasi Viswanathan
- Music by: Srikanth Deva
- Production company: Pyramid Saimira
- Release date: 27 June 2008
- Running time: 147 minutes
- Country: India
- Language: Tamil

Aayudham Seivom (transl. Let's make weapons) is a 2008 Indian Tamil-language action film written and directed by Udhayan and produced by Pyramid Saimira. The film stars Sundar C and Anjali, while Vivek, Manivannan, Napoleon, and Vijayakumar play supporting roles. The music was composed by Srikanth Deva with cinematography by K. S. Selvaraj and editing by Mu. Kasi Viswanathan. The film was released on 27 June 2008 and failed at the box office.

== Plot ==
Saidai Sathya is a mechanic who has little respect for the law. He parks his car in the middle of the road, creating trouble for other vehicles. A traffic policeman named Kandasamy ignores this violation because he is a close friend of Sathya. Udhayamoorthy, a social activist and lawyer, drags them both to court for obstructing traffic and causing a nuisance. The court finds them guilty, but instead of sentencing them, it sends them to the Madurai Gandhi Museum for help, where they meet a college student named Meenakshi.

After Sathya is discharged, he starts a job as a henchman. VBR, a former minister, sends Sathya to steal a confidential file containing vital evidence on the death of collector Leelavathi at Udayamoorthy's place. While Sathya is stealing the file, Udayamoorthy dies after being pierced by a steel rod. While dying, Udayamoorthy blesses Sathya by saying "Vazhga Valamudan" (transl. Long live). These last words haunt Sathya, and filled with remorse, he vows to carry on Udayamoorthy's good work. Sathya gathers evidence to expose VBR, whom he discovers is Leelavathi's murderer. VBR's goons burn the documents to destroy the evidence. Sathya continues trying to expose VBR and adopts Gandhian principles of nonviolence and peace.

ACP Ezhumalai, Udhayamoorthy's brother, vows to avenge his death. He thinks that Sathya killed him, although he later finds out that he did not. Sathya sits near the Gandhi statue and follows his example of nonviolence, confident that VBR will be arrested. As he sits, many citizens and police order him to leave, but he does not budge. They later follow suit and sit in front of the statue. At one point, however, Sathya gets shot. Meanwhile, many people protest against VBR. After getting beaten up and almost left for dead, VBR surrenders himself to the police. The film ends with Sathya surviving his shot and getting justice.

== Cast ==
- Sundar C as Saidai Sathya
- Anjali as Meenakshi
- Vivek as Kandasamy
- Manivannan as VBR
- Napoleon as ACP Ezhumalai
- Vijayakumar as Udhayamoorthy
- Nassar as Museum Head
- Sukanya as Leelavathi IAS
- G. M. Kumar as Annaachi
- Shanmugarajan as VBR's accomplice
- Cell Murugan as Arumugam
- Ponnambalam as Rowdy
- G. Gnanasambandam as Judge
- Crane Manohar as Museum Worker
- Chaams as Ramasamy
- Nellai Siva
- Balu Anand as Police Constable
- Muthukaalai as Passerby in Madurai
- Bava Lakshmanan as Man in Bar
- Vichu Vishwanath as Rowdy in Madurai
- Malavika as herself (cameo appearance)
- Vindhya as a dancer in Nene Pettaikku song
- Vela Ramamoorthy as Inspector (uncredited)

== Production ==
Vijayan was supposed to appear in this film but died.

== Soundtrack ==
The soundtrack was composed by Srikanth Deva.

Track listing
No.	Title	Lyrics	Singer(s)	Length
1.	"Kandom Kandom"	Snehan	Murugesh, Senthildass Velayutham	4:46
2.	"Nene Pettaiku"	Pa. Vijay	Arsith	4:52
3.	"Innum Oru"	Pa. Vijay	Krish, Chinmayi Sripada	4:46
4.	"Moonu Kasu"	Udhayan	Arsith	4:54
5.	"Kodi Parakudhu"	Udhayan	Sriram, Vaishali	5:05
Total length:				24:23

== Release ==
Aayudham Seivom was released on 27 June 2008 by Pyramid Saimira.

=== Critical reception ===
Sify wrote "Like all Sundar C films, this one is also strictly aimed at the B & C audiences. It could have been far better if Udhayan had tried to explore the unknown instead of going through the same beaten track". S. R. Ashok Kumar of The Hindu wrote, "Three cheers for the director and the crew for highlighting a message, virtually forgotten in these days of aggression and violence. For Sundar C it is a dream role, where he can display both his histrionic talent and biceps". Cinesouth criticised the filmmakers for preaching Gandhi's principles such as non-violence without actually following them, concluding, "If Gandhi happens to see [Aayudham Seivom], he would turn his walking stick into a weapon!". Pavithra Srinivasan of Rediff.com wrote, "Not really a bad thing on paper but as they say it's the execution that matters. And that's where everything falls flat". She felt Anjali was wasted, but appreciated Vivek's sarcasm-filled comedy. The film was also reviewed by Kalki.

=== Box office ===
Aayudham Seivom opened at number 2 at the Chennai box office. Although the film's collections reduced by the weekend, the media believed it would eventually recover its cost "due to a good masala mix and comedy track". However, by the following week, the film "disappeared from the BO reckoning" and became a failure.
