= Gouravam (2013 film) =

2013 Indian film by Radha Mohan

- Movie poster of Tamil version
- Directed by: Radha Mohan
- Written by: Radha Mohan; Viji (Tamil version); B. V. S. Ravi (Telugu version)
- Produced by: Prakash Raj
- Starring: Allu Sirish; Yami Gautam; Prakash Raj
- Cinematography: Preetha Jayaraman
- Edited by: Jerome Alen
- Music by: S. Thaman
- Production company: Prakash Raj Productions
- Distributed by: Vendhar Movies
- Release date: 19 April 2013
- Country: India
- Languages: Tamil; Telugu

Gouravam (transl. Honour) is a 2013 Indian social thriller film, written and directed by Radha Mohan. Simultaneously shot in Tamil and Telugu languages, the film was produced by Prakash Raj under the banner of Duet Movies. It marks the acting debut of Allu Sirish, brother of Allu Arjun, and also stars Yami Gautam in her Tamil debut. The film also features Prakash Raj, Harish Uthaman, Nassar, Elango Kumaravel, Vignesh, Sricharan, and Brahmaji in supporting roles. The film deals with the issue of honour killing. The music was composed by S. Thaman. The film released on 19 April 2013 with a linear narrative in Tamil and with a non-linear narrative in Telugu. The film received mixed reviews from critics and audience.

== Plot ==
Arjun, a rich man, is sent by to meet a prostitute. On his way back to the airport he comes across a village called T. Vennure, which is his best friend Shanmugam's village. On landing in the village, Arjun learns that Shanmugam has eloped with Rajeshwari, the daughter of Pasupathy, a rich landlord in the village who is hell bent to save his family's prestige always, and is missing from the past six months. After meeting Shanmugam's father and finding out some bitter truths about Shanmugam, Arjun decides to stay in the village and find his missing friend. A young lawyer named Yazhini / Yamini assists him in his work. After finding a strong opposition from Pasupathy's son Saravanan / Jagapathi and Palani / Rambabu, Arjun, along with his friend Venky and Yazhini, assembles all their college friends as a group along with the neighbor village youths as a group to find the mystery behind Shanmugam and Rajeshwari's absence from the village, only to learn that they were killed and buried at the grounds of a damaged monument. Arjun stays back there to find out the reason behind the couple's death. After finding help from Pasupathy's wife and daughter-in-law, Arjun files a case with the help of Yazhini. The case, though interrupted many times due to Saravanan / Jagapathi's men, including the town's police, remains steady due to the efforts of Arjun and his friends. One fine day, on the request of Pasupathy's wife, Palani / Rambabu promises to help Arjun in the mystery. As promised, he helps them by narrating the incidents that actually happened.

=== Tamil-language ending ===
Palani starts telling the truths to Arjun, Yazhini, Venky, and their group. The night Rajeshwari eloped with Shanmugam, Pasupathy orders Saravanan and Palani to bring her back home. They find her with Shanmugam in a bus and take them to a rice godown. There, while Saravanan mercilessly thrashes Shanmugam, Rajeshwari stops him, holds Shanmugam's hand, and tells Saravanan that she cannot live without him. In a fit of rage, Saravanan cuts Rajeshwari's hand with a sword. While Palani could know what was happening, the couple is killed by Saravanan. Palani confesses the same in front of the magistrate, which leads her to issue an arrest warrant on Saravanan as well as Pasupathy, who was aware of the happenings. Saravanan, frustrated, goes on a killing spree to kill Arjun and his friend, only to be thrashed mercilessly by Arjun. Saravanan surrenders himself to the police, whereas Pasupathy shoots himself before the police reach him. The movie thus ends on a happy note with Arjun's friends returning to home and an injured Arjun talking to the media about the honor killing that took place there.

=== Telugu-language ending ===
After knowing the truth from Rambabu, Arjun and Venky rush to the court along with him, only to be attacked by Jagapathi midway. A combat takes place between Arjun and Jagapathi, and while both were almost exhausted, Arjun's friends rush to the spot, thus making Jagapathi and his men escape from there. Now, Rambabu and a blood-stained Arjun go to Pasupathy's home to tell the truth. Rambabu starts narrating what happened. The night Rajeshwari eloped with Shankar, Pasupathy orders Jagapathi and Rambabu to bring her back home. They find her with Shankar in a bus and take them to a cold storage. There, while Jagapathi mercilessly thrashes Shankar, Rajeshwari stops him, holds Shankar's hand, and tells Jagapathi that she cannot live without him. In a fit of rage, Jagapathi cuts Rajeshwari's hand with a sword. While Rambabu could know what was happening, the couple is killed by Jagapathi. Pasupathy and his family, who were not at all aware about this, experience a bitter shock. Later on, Jagapathi arrives and confesses the truth, saying that he did it to save their family's prestige. A completely changed Pasupathy kills Jagapathi by shooting him after realizing his mistake. He then surrenders to the police voluntarily. Arjun, depressed by the events, is solaced by Shankar's father. This incident brings a change in the dominant caste people and thus integrating themselves with the oppressed-caste people.

== Cast ==
Actor (Tamil)	Actor (Telugu)	Role (Tamil)	Role (Telugu)
Allu Sirish		Arjun	Arjun
Yami Gautam		Yazhini	Yamini
Prakash Raj		Pasupathy	Pasupathy
Harish Uthaman		Saravanan	Jagapathi
Nassar		Soundarapandyan, Yazhini's father	Sundararamayya, Yamini's father
Elango Kumaravel		Maasi	Baachi
Vignesh		Shanmugam	Shankar
Sricharan		Venky	Venky
Brahmaji		Palani	Rambabu
Lakshmi Priyaa Chandramouli		Saravanan's wife	Jagapathi's wife
Pavitra Lokesh		Pasupathy's wife	Pasupathy's wife
Ankit Patel		Krishnan	Krishna
L. B. Sriram		Shanmugam's father	Shankar's father
Madhu		Arjun's friend	Arjun's friend
Priya		Rajeshwari	Rajeshwari
Kaajal Pasupathi		Sumanthi	Sumanthi
Anupama Kumar		Arjun's mother (Note: deleted scene in Tamil)	Arjun's mother
Pavani Reddy		Arjun's friend	Arjun's friend
Rekha Suresh		Judge (uncredited)	Judge (uncredited)
Tamil version
Cast		Role	
Swaminathan		'Otha Vote' Subbaiah	'Otha Vote' Subbaiah
Muthukaalai		Man looking for election commission	Man looking for election commission

== Production ==
The film was first reported in August 2011, when it was announced that Naga Chaitanya would come together with director Radha Mohan to make his debut in Tamil cinema by starring in a bilingual venture. The film was titled Gouravam and touted to be a "family-entertainer" with Thaman signed on as music composer and Preetha as cinematographer. In early 2012, Varalaxmi Sarathkumar was selected to play the lead female role, even before the release of her debut venture Podaa Podi, mentioning that the bilingual would be an "important film in her career". A photoshoot was subsequently held, while Chaitanya's father Nagarjuna agreed to finance the film under their home production house, Annapoorna Studios.

However, in a turn of events, Naga Chaitanya opted out of the project and the lead role was handed to Allu Sirish, the third son of producer Allu Aravind, who would make his debut as an actor. Varalaxmi also subsequently opted out and was reported to be replaced by Tamannaah, but this proved untrue. Furthermore, Amala Paul was approached for the role, while Nithya Menen, Priya Anand, Aindrita Ray and Nidhi Subbaiah were all also considered. Finally, Yami Gautam, known for her role in Bollywood film Vicky Donor, was chosen as the heroine of the film, opposite Sirish. Prakash Raj, who had produced most of Radha Mohan's films with the exception of Ponniyin Selvan, had it announced that the film would be produced under the banner of Duet Movies. Harish will be seen in a pivotal role in Radha Mohan's Gauravam.

Filming for Gouravam started in Chennai on 25 June 2012 and continued in Mysore.

== Soundtrack ==
Gouravam (Tamil/Telugu)

Soundtrack album by S. Thaman
- Released: 31 March 2013
- Genre: Feature film soundtrack
- Label: Prakash Raj Music
- Producer: Thaman S

S. Thaman chronology
Greeku Veerudu (2013)	Gouravam (Tamil/Telugu) (2013)	Tadakha (2013)

Gouravam's soundtrack comprises four tracks composed by S. Thaman. The album was released on 31 March 2013.

Tamil

All lyrics are written by Madhan Karky.

No.	Title	Singer(s)	Length
1.	"Ondraai Ondraai"	Haricharan, Suchitra
2.	"Maname Maname"	Ranjith, Vardhani Thaman
3.	"Mannadacha Pandhu"	Gaana Bala
4.	"Oru Grammam"	Gaana Bala

Telugu

All lyrics are written by Chandrabose.

No.	Title	Singer(s)	Length
1.	"Okkatai Okkatai"	Haricharan, Karthik, Rahul Nambiar, Geetha Madhuri, Ranina Reddy, Suchitra
2.	"Manasa Manasa"	Mallikarjun & Vardhani Thaman
3.	"Chethinundhi Mannu Thesi"	Muralidhar
4.	"Oka Gramam"	Deepu

== Release ==
The first look of the film was released in June 2012, after commencement of filming. The Tamil audio release was held in a special Neeya Naana TV show on inter-caste marriages. The Telugu audio release function was held at the IPL cricket match between Sunrisers Hyderabad Team and Pune Warriors India in Hyderabad on 5 April 2013. Prakash Raj, Allu Sirish, Yami Gautam, Radha Mohan, Singer Geeta Madhuri and Allu Aravind graced the event The distribution rights were acquired by Vendhar Movies. The satellite rights of the film were sold to STAR Vijay.

== Controversies ==
Based on the theatrical trailer of the film a local leader in Tamil Nadu, Pongular Manigandan, accused the producers that the movie will provoke people to indulge in incidents like Dharmapuri caste violence and is supportive of honour killing, which was subsequently denied by director Radha Mohan.

== Reception ==
Gouravam opened to mixed response from the critics. While the underlining points of the film are content, performances of the young and senior actors and the message, the main drawback is lack of entertainment values. Nonetheless, people have praised Allu Sirish for choosing an off-beat film to make his debut as an actor rather than opting for commercial potboiler.

The Times of India gave a review stating "Gouravam is proof that you need more than good intentions to make a movie about a social evil. The film is a social drama that unfolds as a mystery but the catch is that unless you have been living under a rock, you would know its revelations even as its sets up its plot. And, what could have been a suspenseful drama, a whodunit of sorts, becomes a very predictable film that is only fitfully entertaining."

Baradwaj Rangan of The Hindu wrote, "For a plot strewn with internecine caste rivalries, petrol-bomb attacks, a procedural-type investigative set-up and a simmering Prakash Raj (he plays the village’s periyavar [elder]), Gouravam never really gets going." Regarding the Telugu version, Sangeetha Devi Dundoo of The Hindu gave a review stating "A good premise, but the film fails to build it up to give us a riveting watch".
