= Sricharan =

Indian actor and lawyer (born 1981)

- Born: M. Sricharan Rangarajan; 24 April 1981 (age 45); Chennai, Tamil Nadu India
- Education: National University of Singapore; New York University School of Law
- Occupations: actor, Lawyer
- Years active: 2008–present

Sricharan Rangarajan (born 24 April 1981) is an Indian actor and a lawyer based in Chennai, India.

== Career ==
As an Actor

Having debuted in the 2008 Tamil film Mudhal Mudhal Mudhal Varai, Sricharan went on to make his break with Radha Mohan's 2011 film Payanam or Gaganam where he acted in a double role. He then portrayed a supporting role in the Siddharth starrer 180 directed by Jayendra. He played the role of a guy next door, a radio jockey in San Francisco, United States.

As a Lawyer

He completed his dual masters of law degree in New York University School of Law and National University of Singapore. He is a qualified practitioner primarily based out of the High Court of Judicature at Madras (Chennai, India). He was previously serving as Special Government Pleader and Additional Advocate General for the state government. In the year 2023, he was designated as Senior Advocate by the High Court.

== Filmography ==
Actor

Year	Film	Role	Language	Notes	Ref.
2008	Mudhal Mudhal Mudhal Varai	Mahesh	Tamil	Credited as Charan	
2011	Payanam	Yusuf Khan (in climax), Ranganath	Tamil		
2011	Gaganam	Yusuf Khan (in climax), Ranganath	Telugu		
2011	Nootrenbadhu	RJ "Sam"; Sambasivam	Tamil		
2011	180	RJ "Sam"; Sambasivam	Telugu		
2012	Billa II	Bobby	Tamil		
2013	Gouravam	Venky	Tamil		
2013	Gouravam	Venky	Telugu		
2015	Thani Oruvan	Kathiresan IPS	Tamil		
2017	Brindavanam	Motorcycle Driver	Tamil		

As dubbing artist

Year	Film	Actor	Language	Ref.
2017	Sachin: A Billion Dreams	Sachin Tendulkar	Tamil	
