= Anuja Iyer =

Indian actress and model

- Born: Chennai, Tamil Nadu, India
- Occupations: Actress; model; columnist
- Years active: 1980–present

Anuja Iyer is an Indian actress and model who works in the Tamil film industry. She made her acting debut in the low budget horror flick Sivi (2007) and became noted for her performances in Ninaithale Inikkum (2009) and Unnaipol Oruvan (2009). Since April 2010, she has been working as a columnist for the popular entertainment website Behindwoods.

== Early life ==
Anuja was born as Sandhya into a Tamil Brahmin family in Chennai, Tamil Nadu. She did her schooling at Rosary Matriculation Higher Secondary School, Santhome, Chennai and went on to pursue a B.Com (Honours) degree at Shri Ram College of Commerce in Delhi. She then studied under the Sanwa Bank scholarship programme, and finished her Master's degree in Advertising and Public Relations in Indian Institute of Mass Communication (IIMC), Delhi, graduating with a PRSI (Public Relations Society of India) Award.

== Career ==
Her first film was the horror flick, Sivi (2007), in which she played a ghost. She was praised for her performance. Her second film, Mudhal Mudhal Mudhal Varai (2008), termed as Tamil cinema's first "urban centric film" received critical acclaim, winning awards at international film festivals for its innovative approach to film making. Her role was once again lauded by critics and audiences. In 2009, she appeared in the Prithviraj Starrer college drama Ninaithale Inikkum, a remake of the 2006 Malayalam film Classmates. Anuja played the character of a reserved Muslim college student Shalini who attempts to take revenge on the murderer of her lover. Later that year, she starred in Unnaipol Oruvan and its Telugu version Eeenadu alongside veteran actors Mohanlal, Kamal Haasan and Venkatesh. Her portrayal of Natasha Rajkumar, a television journalist, was appreciated by critics and fetched her a nomination for the Best Supporting Actress Award at the 56th Filmfare Awards South.

In 2013, Anuja hosted season 2 of Raj TV's Carnatic music reality-talent show, Tanishq Swarna Sangeetham.

In 2015, she got engaged to entrepreneur Bharat Ram.

== Filmography ==
| Year | Title | Role | Notes |
|---|---|---|---|
| 2007 | Sivi | Nandhini | |
| 2008 | Mudhal Mudhal Mudhal Varai | Sindhu | |
| 2008 | Malare Mounama | Kavi | Canadian film |
| 2009 | Ninaithale Inikkum | Shalee | |
| 2009 | Unnaipol Oruvan | Natasha Rajkumar | Nominated, Filmfare Award for Best Supporting Actress – Tamil |
| 2009 | Eeenadu | Shilpa Krishna | Telugu film |
| 2011 | Ko | Manjushree | Special appearance |
| 2011 | Yuvan Yuvathi | Thangameena | Guest appearance |
| 2012 | Vinmeengal | Ila | |
| 2012 | Kadhal 2 Kalyanam | | Unreleased |

=== Television ===
| Year | Title | Role | Language | Channel |
|---|---|---|---|---|
| 2012 | Dharmayutham | Gayathri | Tamil | Vijay TV |
| 2013 | Tanishq Swarna Sangeetham | Host | Tamil | Raj TV |
