= Elango Kumaravel =

Indian actor, writer

- Other name: Kumaravel
- Occupations: Actor; writer
- Years active: 2001–present

Elango Kumaravel is an Indian actor, writer and a co-founder of the Chennai-based theatre group "Magic Lantern". He is an alumnus of Pondicherry University's Sankaradas Swamigal School of Performing Arts and the Chennai-based theatre workshop koothuppattarai. He has also worked as a casting assistant for the 2007 film Loins of Punjab Presents and wrote the script for the 2008 film Kattradhu Kalavu. He was involved in the production of "Ey Aa O!" a musical fusion work of collaboration between Indian folk and classical musicians.

== Career ==
When Kumaravel was staging Kalki's Ponniyin Selvan, he was spotted by Nassar and approached to star in his film Maayan. While Vishwanathan met Kumaravel on the sets of the play Minnal Ravi (Virtuous Burglar), he was introduced to Radha Mohan and starred in Azhagiya Theeye. Kumaravel became a regular in Radha Mohan's films. He garnered acclaim for his role in Abhiyum Naanum as a beggar named Ravi Shastri.

== Filmography ==
- All films are in Tamil, unless otherwise noted.

=== Tamil films ===
List of Elango Kumaravel Tamil film acting credits
Year	Title	Role	Notes
2001	Maayan		
2002	Azhagi	Kaakaiyan	
2003	Iyarkai	Exorcist	
2004	Azhagiya Theeye	Gopi (Chithappa)	
2005	Ponniyin Selvan	Pandiya	
2005	Sandakozhi	Balu and Kartik's friend	uncredited role
2008	Velli Thirai	Hamid Mustafa	
2008	Abhiyum Naanum	Ravi Shasthri	
2008	Mudhal Mudhal Mudhal Varai	Gopal	
2010	Madrasapattinam	Taxi driver	
2010	Irandu Mugam	Parthasarathy's friend	
2011	Payanam	Subash	
2011	Vaagai Sooda Vaa	Kuruvikaarar	
2013	Gouravam	Maasi	
2013	Varuthapadatha Valibar Sangam	Constable	
2014	His Wife	Father Godwin	
2014	Un Samayal Arayil	Kalidas's uncle	
2015	Dharani	Mahesh	
2015	Ivanuku Thannila Gandam	James	
2015	Uppu Karuvaadu	Manja alias Karnan	
2017	Kurangu Bommai	Sekar	
2017	12-12-1950	Jail wardern	
2017	Richie	'Kaaka' Peter	
2018	Diya	Police officer	
2018	60 Vayadu Maaniram	Rajappan	
2018	Kaatrin Mozhi	Kumbakarai Krishnamurthy aka 'Kumki'	
2019	Sarvam Thaala Mayam	Johnson	
2019	Natpe Thunai	B. C.	
2019	Aruvam	Jagan's friend	
2019	Hero	Mathi's father	
2020	Asuraguru	Kumaravel	
2021	Jai Bhim	Police officer	
2022	Veeramae Vaagai Soodum	Parishuddam	
2022	Vikram	Lawrence	
2022	Jothi	Muthu	
2022	Karotiyin Kadhali		
2022	Rathasaatchi	Murugesan	
2024	Captain Miller	Kannaya	
2024	Blue Star	Ranjith and Sam's father	
2024	Nanban Oruvan Vantha Piragu	Ravi	
2024	Kadaisi Ulaga Por	Bhai	
2025	Kingston	Martin	
2025	Tourist Family	Gunasekar	
2025	Thug Life	Amaran and Chandra's father	
2025	Kumaara Sambavam	Varadharajan	
2026	Lucky the Superstar	MLA's brother-in-law	
2026	Pyaar Prema Kalyanam	Srinivasan	

Key
†	Denotes films that have not yet been released

=== Other language films ===
List of Elango Kumaravel other language film acting credits
Year	Title	Role	Language	Notes
2011	Gaganam	Subash	Telugu	Bilingual films
2013	Gouravam	Baachi	Telugu	Bilingual films
2019	Ninu Veedani Needanu Nene	Subha Reddy	Telugu	Bilingual films
2022	John Luther	Prasad	Malayalam	
2023	Sam Bahadur	V. K. Krishna Menon	Hindi	

Streaming television

List of Elango Kumaravel streaming television acting credits
Year	Title	Role	Platform
2022	Suzhal: The Vortex	Guna	Amazon Prime Video
2024	Inspector Rishi	Irfan	Amazon Prime Video
2024	Chutney Sambar	Peter	Disney+ Hotstar
2026	Resort	Rajadurai "Durai"	JioHotstar

Dubbing artist

List of Elango Kumaravel film dubbing credits
Year	Title	Role	Actor
2007	Mozhi	Ananthakrishnan	Brahmanandam

Writer

List of Elango Kumaravel film writing credits
Year	Title	Writer
2010	Kattradhu Kalavu	Story
2022	Ponniyin Selvan: I	Screenplay
2023	Ponniyin Selvan: II	Screenplay

== Plays ==
=== Actor ===
- Vaali Vadham (2006)
- Bheeshma (2007)
- Ravana (2008)
- Kurukshetra (2009)
- Raghuvamsam (2010)
- Krishna the Soul Seeker (2011)
- Sundara Kaandam (2012)
- Chakravyuh (2013)
- Hanuman (2014)
- Parasurama: Wielder of the Axe of Justice (2018)

=== Other including roles ===
- Camus' Caligula in Tamil (1993)
- Molière's Tartuffe in Tamil (1997)
- Philip Minyana's Ou Va Tu Jeremie? In Tamil (1998)
- Kalki's Ponniyin Selvan performed in 1999 (Tamil historical play)
