= Mathangi Jagdish =

- Genres: Film, jazz, blues R&B, Indian classical
- Occupations: Vocalist and Mentor on Wholistic Vocalist by Ma.Ja, Television host
- Years active: 2001–present
- Website: http://www.mathangijagdish.in

Mathangi Jagdish is a singer songwriter, coke Studio artist, stage performer with 475 songs to her credit and a mentor on her platform Wholistic Vocalist.

== Early life ==
Born in Calcutta and raised in Delhi, Mathangi completed her schooling in Delhi, her graduation in Bangalore and her masters in Chennai. While pursuing her career in advertising in a leading multinational agency.

== Career ==
She got the opportunity to sing her first solo song ("Anju Mani") for music director Deva in the film Choklet and her first duet "Kokkara Kara Giri Giri" in the same film. Due to her eclectic upbringing and ability to speak Hindi, English and Tamil fluently, she has sung in over 17 languages in her career. She sang the song "X Machi" in the film Ghajini. In 2011, she was a part of the legendary show Coke Studio@MTV where she sang Khilte Hain Gul Yahan, parts of the original composition of Tu Hai Yahaan and a third piece where Sufi meets Carnatic music Thyagaraaja Kriti Brovabharama along with Tochi Raina. This fusion piece was featured in the opening episode of Coke Studio@MTV. In addition to this, she was also a part of the live Coke Studio@MTV gigs across the country.

Over the last 11 years she has had the privilege of singing for A. R. Rahman, Ilaiyaraaja and his sons Yuvan Shankar Raja and Karthik Raja and his daughter Bhavatharini. She has also worked with music directors Harris Jayaraj, Vidyasagar, Bharadwaj, S. A. Rajkumar, D. Imman, Ramesh Vinayakam, Sabesh–Murali, Sirpy, Bharani, Dhina, Joshua Sridhar, Devi Sri Prasad to name a few.

She was also a part of first season of Music Mojo on Kappa TV. She sang 7 songs in that show.

== Television ==
She has been a host and judge on various South Indian music competition television shows including Super Singer & season 2 of Sun TV's Sangeetha Mahayuddham.

She also host Sri Lankan music competition "Ilayaganam" which was aired on Shakthi TV.

She was also a host on the debut season of the Carnatic music music competition television show, Tanishq Swarna Sangeetham which was aired on Raj TV.
