= Udhayan =

Indian Tamil film director

- Born: S. B. Ramadoss; Perunali, Tamil Nadu, India
- Occupations: Director, screenwriter, dialogue writer
- Years active: 2006–present

Udhayan is an Indian Tamil film director, based in Chennai, India.

== Personal life ==
His birth name is S. B. Ramadoss. Born in Perunali village at Ramanathapuram District. His elder brother Sivaram Gandhi is a dialogue writer who worked in films like Samundi (1992), Vandicholai Chinraasu (1994) and Anantha Poongatre (1999).

== Career ==
Udhayan has directed two Tamil action films Perarasu (2006) and Aayudham Seivom (2008). Together with director Sundar C he has written screenplays for Aranmanai, Aambala, Aranmanai 2 and Aranmanai 4. He has been written dialogues for the unreleased film Ajith From Aruppukottai.

== Filmography ==
Year	Film	Director	Writer	Notes
2006	Perarasu	✓	✓	Credited as Udhayan
2008	Aayudham Seivom	✓	✓	Credited as Udhayan
2014	Aranmanai	✗	Screenplay	Credited as S. B. Ramadoss
2015	Aambala	✗	Screenplay	Credited as S. B. Ramadoss
2016	Aranmanai 2	✗	Screenplay	Credited as S. B. Ramadoss
