= Radha Mohan =

Indian film director and screenwriter

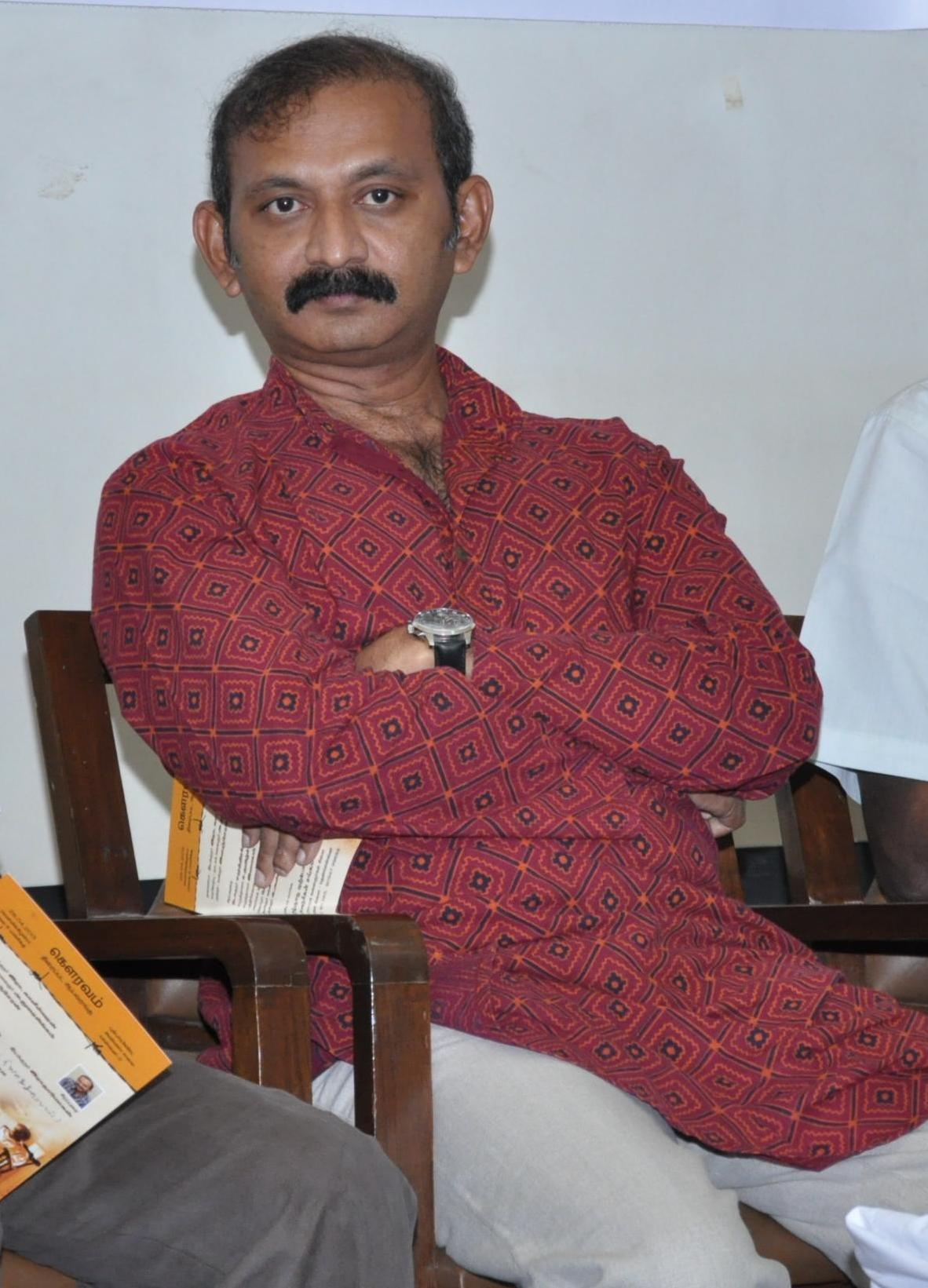
- Mohan at a press Meet
- Occupation: Film director Screenwriter
- Years active: 2004–present
- Spouse: Sheeba Radhamohan

Radha Mohan is an Indian film director and screenwriter of the South Indian film industry. He is known for films such as Mozhi (2007) and Kaatrin Mozhi (2018) starring Jyothika, Abhiyum Naanum (2008) with Prakash Raj, and Payanam(2011) with Nagarjuna.

== Career ==
Radha Mohan began work on his first film Smile Please in 1996, which had dialogues written by his friend Babu, who had appeared in the lead role in En Uyir Thozhan (1990). The film was to star Prakash Raj in the lead role, but financial restraints meant that the film was later shelved. The film was later set for release during Diwali 1998 under the title of Ananthakrishnan, but still failed to clear financial hurdles.

The director worked under R. V. Udayakumar before he did his first film release, Azhagiya Theeye (2004). Mozhi (2007) is his career's biggest hit, followed by Payanam (2011).

== Filmmaking style ==
Known for his strong storylines and realistic portrayal of women, Mohan's films have largely been clean family entertainment. He has a penchant for humor in his films, which have been rib-ticklers even though they carry strong messages and handle serious themes.

== Filmography ==
- Note: all films are in Tamil, unless otherwise noted.

Year	Film	Notes		
Year	Film	Notes	2004	Azhagiya Theeye
2005	Ponniyin Selvan			
2007	Mozhi	Tamil Nadu State Film Award for Best Film (Second Prize); Nominated, Filmfare Award for Best Director – Tamil		
2008	Abhiyum Naanum	Tamil Nadu State Film Award for Best Director; Tamil Nadu State Film Award for Best Film (Second Prize)		
2011	Payanam	Simultaneously shot in Telugu as Gaganam; Tamil Nadu State Film Award for Best Story Writer; Norway Tamil Film Festival Award for Best Director		
2013	Gouravam	Simultaneously shot in Telugu		
2015	Uppu Karuvaadu			
2017	Brindavanam			
2018	60 Vayadu Maaniram			
2018	Kaatrin Mozhi			
2021	Malaysia To Amnesia			
2023	Bommai			
2024	Chutney Sambar	Web Series		

=== Recurring collaborations ===
Elango Kumaravel has worked in ten of his works. Prakash Raj (producer and actor) and M. S. Bhaskar have worked in seven of his films. Dialogue writer Viji has worked on six of his films. Editor Kasi Viswanathan and Thalaivasal Vijay have worked in four of his films. Only people with three or more collaborations are listed.

Films	Elango Kumaravel	Prakash Raj	M. S. Bhaskar	Viji	Kasi Viswanathan	Thalaivasal Vijay	Vidyasagar	Mahesh Muthuswami	T. S. Jay	Mohan Raman	Mayilsamy	Manobala	Sricharan	Balaji
Azhagiya Theeye (2004)	check	check	check	check	check									check
Ponniyin Selvan (2005)	check	check		check	check	check	check				check			check
Mozhi (2007)	As dubbing artiste	check	check	check	check		check							check
Abhiyum Naanum (2008)	check	check			check	check	check					check		
Payanam (2011)	check	check	check			check				check		check	check	
Gouravam (2013)	check	check	check	check									check	
Uppu Karuvaadu (2015)	check		check					check	check		check			
Brindavanam (2017)				check		check			check				check	
60 Vayadu Maaniram (2018)	check	check		check					check	check				
Kaatrin Mozhi (2018)	check		check					check		check	check	check		
Malaysia To Amnesia (2021)			check					check						
Bommai (2023)														
Chutney Sambar (2024)	check													

== Awards ==
Year	Film	Category
2007	Mozhi	Tamil Nadu State Film Award for Best Film (Second Prize); Nominated, Filmfare Award for Best Director – Tamil
2008	Abhiyum Naanum	Tamil Nadu State Film Award for Best Director; Tamil Nadu State Film Award for Best Film (Second Prize)
2011	Payanam	Tamil Nadu State Film Award for Best Story Writer; Norway Tamil Film Festival Award for Best Director
