= Mudhal Mudhal Mudhal Varai =

2008 film directed by Krishnan Seshadri Gomatam

- Poster
- Directed by: Krishnan Seshadri Gomatam
- Written by: Krishnan Seshadri Gomatam
- Produced by: Krishnan Seshadri Gomatam
- Starring: C. P. Satyajit; Anuja Iyer; Charan; Vidya Easwaran; Keevna; Kumaravel
- Cinematography: Fowzia Fathima
- Edited by: B. Lenin
- Music by: Aslam Mustafa
- Production company: Krena Cinema
- Release date: 19 September 2008
- Running time: 143 minutes
- Country: India
- Language: Tamil

Mudhal Mudhal Mudhal Varai (transl. From beginning to beginning) also known as M3V, is a 2008 Tamil language film directed by debutant Krishnan Seshadri Gomatam, who previously worked as an assistant to Mani Rathnam and P. C. Sreeram. The film stars C. P. Satyajit, Anuja Iyer, and Charan. This film features a hundred new faces for the first time in Tamil cinema. It was released on 19 September 2008.

== Cast ==
- C. P. Satyajit as Hayagreev "Haggy"
- Anuja Iyer as Sindhu
- Charan as Mahesh
- Vidya Easwaran as Maya
- Keevna as Tryaeshika
- E. Kumaravel as Gopal
- M. V. Sriram
- Murari
- Senthil as Selvam "Shakespeare"

== Soundtrack ==
The songs were composed by Aslam Mustafa.

- "Soup Song"
- "Kondadum" - M. J. Shriram

== Critical reception ==
A critic from Rediff.com wrote "Commercial movie-lovers might not find this to their taste but if you're a lover of fairly realistic cinema, capturing the life of an urban metrosexual's life and times, then M3V is for you". A critic from Chennai Online wrote that "To sum up, M3V impresses in parts and fails to emerge as a wholesome movie".

== Accolades ==
| Year | Award | Category | Nominee | Outcome | Ref. |
|---|---|---|---|---|---|
| 2008 | New York International Independent Film and Video Festival | Best Drama Feature in the Best Feature film – International | Krishnan Seshadri Gomatam | Won | |
| 2008 | Cairo International Film Festival | Feature Digital Films – Silver Award | Krishnan Seshadri Gomatam | Won | |
| 2008 | International Film Fest in Nagpur | Best Female Lead | Anuja Iyer | Won | |
