= Abhiyum Naanum (film) =

2008 film by Radha Mohan

- Promotional poster
- Directed by: Radha Mohan
- Written by: Radha Mohan; Dialogue: C. P. Narayanan; R. Subramanian
- Produced by: Prakash Raj
- Starring: Prakash Raj; Trisha; Aishwarya; Ganesh Venkatraman
- Cinematography: Preetha Jayaraman
- Edited by: Mu. Kasi Viswanathan
- Music by: Vidyasagar
- Production company: Duet Movies
- Release date: 19 December 2008
- Country: India
- Languages: Tamil; Telugu

Abhiyum Naanum (transl. Abhi and I) (Note: Spelt as Abiyum Naanum on the CBFC certificate.) is a 2008 Indian Tamil-language comedy drama film produced by Prakash Raj and directed by Radha Mohan. The film stars Raj, Trisha, Aishwarya and Ganesh Venkatraman, with Prithviraj in a special appearance. It is based on the American film Father of the Bride. The film follows a man who is attached to his daughter but becomes flustered when he and his family prepare for her marriage.

The film was launched in October 2007 and released on 19 December 2008. It won three Tamil Nadu State Film Awards, including Best Director (Radha Mohan) and Best Film (Second Prize).

The film was mostly dubbed and partially reshot in Telugu as Akashamantha (transl. Sky-high) with Jagapathi Babu replacing Prithviraj, which released on 27 May 2009. It was remade in Kannada as Naanu Nanna Kanasu (2010) with Raj reprising his role.

== Plot ==
Raghuram alias Raghu is a simple man who manages estates and doing his own business in Ooty. He meets Sudhakar, a newcomer at Coonoor, who has a young daughter. Raghu sees the father and daughter duo, and smiles thinking of his own daughter. He engages in a conversation with Sudhakar. Raghu married his cousin Anu without their parents' consent. They have a daughter Abhi, whom Raghu loves so much. Abhi is the world to him. Raghu narrates his story to Sudhakar. Raghu does anything for Abhi and usually gets into quarrels with his wife, who has a different way of raising the child.

As years go by, Abhi grows up and her parents are happy with whatever she does. She even adopts a beggar, later named "Ravi Shastri", and he lives with them, considering Abhi as his mother. Raghu's close friend, Dhamu, has no children and considers Abhi as his own daughter as well. When Abhi tells her parents that she wants to study in Delhi, Raghu throws a tantrum. Eventually, Abhi is able to convince Raghu. Even though he is sad thinking about spending two years without Abhi, he moves on. Raghu is elated when she comes back but gets a shock. Abhi tells her parents that she fell in love with a man. Anu is totally fine with it, but Raghu is not. He gets angry and scared and does not talk to Abhi and Anu properly. When Anu tells him that the man is coming from Delhi, Raghu tries to be fine. Once again, he gets shocked when he realises that the man is actually a Sikh, named Joginder Singh. He thereafter maintains distance from Jogi and is cautious not to hurt Abhi's feelings.

Raghu gets amazed when he sees Jogi on TV with the Prime Minister and gets slightly impressed. However, his relationship with Jogi remains the same. One day when a large group of people, whom Raghu assumes to be Jogi's relatives, turn up at his house, he gets frustrated. He vents his anger to Anu, which Abhi hears and gets hurt. Raghu surprisingly does not console Abhi as he is upset with her as well. But soon, they both reconcile when Raghu realises that Abhi would be happy with the man she loves. Raghu learns from Abhi that the people are not relatives of Jogi but just a group of broken people whom Jogi is taking care of. She tells the story of some people, and Raghu feels proud of Jogi. He gets happy and without knowing how to show his happiness, he shouts and screams, causing people to think he has gone mad. Raghu happily tells Anu that he is perfectly fine with the wedding. Meanwhile, Ravi and one of the orphans, Jasbeer Kaur, fall in love. Abhi and Jogi get married with Raghu and Anu's blessing. During their reception, Ravi pours his heart out about his 'mother' Abhi. Dhamu and his wife declare that they are going to adopt a child and thank Jogi for that. Raghu surprises Anu by inviting her parents for the reception and everyone is happy.

The next day at the airport, Abhi and her parents bid an emotional goodbye to each other. Abhi cries on her father's shoulder but Raghu does not shed a single tear. He happily sends Abhi with Jogi and walks out of the airport. He suddenly laughs hysterically, much to Ravi and Anu's shock. In the present, where Raghu brings Sudhakar to his home. Ravi had married Jasbeer Kaur. Raghu tells Sudhakar that daughters are the sweetest blessings from God and they should be proud parents. He also warns him that time flies by real quickly and that he has to enjoy the maximum with his daughter. When they get a call from Abhi from Delhi, everyone leaves Sudhakar alone in the room with his daughter. Sudhakar turns to his daughter and smiles happily at her, which she returns.

== Cast ==
- Prakash Raj as Raghuram
- Trisha as Abhi
- Aishwarya as Anuradha (Anu)
- Ganesh Venkatram as Joginder Singh
- Thalaivasal Vijay as Dhamu
- Sriranjani as Dhamu's wife
- Manobala as Varatharajan
- Kumaravel as Ravi Shastri
- Manmeet Singh as Veerji
- Jayashree as Jasbeer Kaur
- Geetha Ravishankar as the school principal
- Chaams as a man at the school admissions interview
- Master Madhu and Master Sawan Lotha as Chotu and Motu
- Prithviraj as Sudhakar (special appearance)
- Jagapathi Babu as Sudhakar (in Telugu; special appearance)

== Production ==
After the success of Mozhi (2007), Moser Baer, who released the DVD of Mozhi under their company, collaborated with Duet Movies and launched three projects in September 2007 with Abhiyum Naanum being one of them. Trisha was the director's first and only choice for playing the title character Abhi, and he said he could not "think of any other actor" besides Prakash Raj to play her father. Lakshmi Gopalaswamy declined to play Trisha's mother, and Aishwarya took the role after being requested to do so by her grandmother. Ganesh Venkatraman made his Tamil debut through this film. For the role of his character's Punjabi uncle, over sixty sardars from Mumbai auditioned before Manmeet Singh, known for his advertisements, was chosen, marking his Tamil debut. Prithviraj, despite already being committed to the Malayalam film Kangaroo (2007), agreed to appear in Abhiyum Naanum and reworked his schedule accordingly. The film was prominently shot in hill stations including Munnar and Ooty.

== Soundtrack ==
The songs and background music were composed by Vidyasagar, with lyrics written by Vairamuthu. Pavithra Srinivasan from Rediff.com rated the album one out of five stars and wrote that, "Barring infrequent flashes of his earlier works, there's very little to write home about. We can only hope Radhamohan's picturisation makes these numbers work". Karthik of Milliblog wrote that "After a stellar Mozhi, the Radhamohan-Vidyasagar combo crashes with a thud". For Akashamantha, two different songs were included.

Tamil version

Song	Singers	Length
"Ore Oru Oorilae"	Kailash Kher	4:40
"Pachhai Kaatre"	Sadhana Sargam	4:39
"Vaa Vaa En Devadhai"	Madhu Balakrishnan	2:33
"Moongil Vittu"	Madhu Balakrishnan	1:10
"Azhagiya Azhagiya Kili"	S. P. Balasubrahmanyam	4:49
"Chinnamma Kalyanam"	Kailash Kher	1:18
"Sher Punjabi"	Rehan Khan	1:10

Telugu version

Song	Lyrics	Singers	Length
"Okanoka Voorilo"	Veturi	Kailash Kher	4:40
"Veeche Gaali Maapai"	Anantha Sriram	Sadhana Sargam	4:39
"Aatala Paatala"	Anantha Sriram	Madhu Balakrishnan	4:40
"Dooram Kaavala"	Anantha Sriram	S. P. Balasubrahmanyam	4:20
"Chinnamma Kalyanam"	Veturi	Kailash Kher	1:38
"Sher Punjabi"	Vairamuthu	Rehan Khan	1:10

== Release and reception ==
Abhiyum Naanum was released on 19 December 2008, after being delayed twice (Diwali 2008 and 14 November 2008). Pavithra Srinivasan of Rediff.com said, "For fathers who love their daughters, this is your pick. Definitely worth a watch" and rated the film 3 out of 5. Malathi Rangarajan of The Hindu said, "Watch it for its natural treatment". Sify said, "Frankly speaking, the Prakash Raj- Radha Mohan combo's Abhiyum Naanum is nowhere in the league of their previous oeuvre Mozhi. With a touching title like that, one would have thought the director would have a more solid script, but somehow it fails to strike a chord like their earlier film", but added that "If you are still looking for a different kind of cinematic experience, then, it's worth a look." The New Indian Express wrote, "The delicate evolution of the father-daughter relationship, and the former's reluctance to accept that his daughter has grown up, is narrated with humour and sensitivity", calling Abhiyum Naanum "Yet another feel-good entertainer from the Mozhi team".

== Remakes ==
Dil Raju, out of interest to remake Abhiyum Naanum in Telugu, showed the film to Nagarjuna and offered him to play the lead role. Nagarjuna felt that it would not suit his image and rejected the offer. Raju then decided to dub the film in Telugu as Akashamantha and reshoot Prithviraj's portions with Sunil due to nativity issues. Editor Marthand K. Venkatesh suggested that Jagapathi Babu do the role instead, who accepted to work in the film despite initially being reluctant. His portions were shot at Ramoji Film City in February 2009. Akashamantha was released on 27 March 2009. The film was remade in Kannada as Naanu Nanna Kanasu (2010) with Prakash Raj directing the film and reprising his role.

== Accolades ==
Award	Category	Verdict	Recipient(s) and nominee(s)	Ref.
Tamil Nadu State Film Awards	Best Director	Won	Radha Mohan	
Tamil Nadu State Film Awards	Best Film (Second Prize)	Won	Abhiyum Naanum	
Tamil Nadu State Film Awards	Tamil Nadu State Film Award Special Prize	Won	Trisha (Note: Also for Suriya in Vaaranam Aayiram.)	
Fourth International Tamil Film Awards	Best Film	Won	Abhiyum Naanum	
3rd Vijay Awards	Best Film	Nominated	Abhiyum Naanum	

== Legacy ==
Trisha was cast in the Hindi film Khatta Meetha (2010) after Akshay Kumar saw her work in this film.
