= Chithha =

2023 Indian film by S. U. Arun Kumar

- Theatrical release poster
- Directed by: S. U. Arun Kumar
- Written by: S. U. Arun Kumar
- Produced by: Siddharth
- Starring: Siddharth; Nimisha Sajayan; Anjali Nair
- Cinematography: Balaji Subramanyam
- Edited by: Suresh A. Prasad
- Music by: Songs: Dhibu Ninan Thomas; Santhosh Narayanan; Score: Vishal Chandrashekhar
- Production company: Etaki Entertainment
- Distributed by: Red Giant Movies
- Release date: 28 September 2023
- Running time: 139 minutes
- Country: India
- Language: Tamil

Chithha (transl. Father's younger brother) (Note: The title is short for Chithappa.) is a 2023 Indian Tamil-language crime drama film written and directed by S. U. Arun Kumar. Produced by Siddharth, who stars in the lead role alongside Nimisha Sajayan (in her Tamil debut), and Anjali Nair in addition to Baby Sahasra Shree and Baby S. Aafiyah Tasneem in prominent roles, the film revolves around the relationship between a paternal uncle and his niece which goes through several circumstances after the latter goes missing.

Arun Kumar developed the story idea after he came across articles revolving around child sexual abuse and met with survivors of child abuse, government officials and NGOs to provide their feedback based on his ideas before finalising the script. The film was shot in and around Palani. The cinematography was handled by Balaji Subramanyam and editing by Suresh A. Prasad. Dhibu Ninan Thomas and Santhosh Narayanan composed the soundtrack, while Vishal Chandrashekhar composed the score.

Chithha was released theatrically on 29 September 2023 to critical acclaim with praise for the performances, storytelling, direction and themes, and became a commercial success. At the 69th Filmfare Awards South, the film won seven awards including Best Film – Tamil.

== Plot ==
Eeswaran is a government employee from Palani who bonds with his eight-year old niece Sundari and is quite protective of her. Eeswaran also has a couple of close friends, one of whom is a police officer named Vadivel, whose niece Ponni is good friends with Sundari. Unable to comprehend her elder sister's romantic conversation with her boyfriend, Ponni assumes that a bevy of deer is present in a forest area close to the school and asks Sundari if she would be interested in going to see the animals after school.

The two girls plan to leave Eeswaran and head to the area on their own. Ponni and Sundari board an auto rickshaw to the area as per the plan, but Sundari gets scared and leaves Ponni, who goes alone to see the area and is sexually assaulted. The next day, Ponni's father accuses Eeswaran of assaulting Ponni, but once Ponni recovers from her state of unconsciousness, it is discovered that Eeswaran is innocent.

Sundari leaves school unaccompanied but gets kidnapped by a paedophile. Eeswaran and the police set out to find Sundari, who has been kept captive for several days. Eeswaran finds out that the police have captured a suspect, but it turns out that the accused is actually Ponni's abuser, who was the auto rickshaw driver; Sundari's abuser was a different criminal. Eeswaran stabs the suspect in revenge for Ponni's abuse. Eeswaran's girlfriend, Shakthi, shares her past of being assaulted and implores him to forget about his vengeance. Eeswaran assents and sleeps beside Sundari in the hospital bed.

A year later, Sundari has fully recovered. Elsewhere, police find what appears to be the paedophile's burnt corpse.

== Cast ==
- Siddharth as Eeswaran "Eesu", Sundari's uncle
- Nimisha Sajayan as Shakthi, Eeswaran's love interest
- Anjali Nair as Sundari's mother and Eeswaran's sister-in-law
- Baby Sahasra Shree as Sundari "Settai", Eeswaran's niece
- Baby S. Aafiyah Tasneem as Ponni, Sundari's friend and Vadivel's niece
- Baalaji S. U. as SI Vadivel, Eeswaran and Sakthi's friend; Ponni's uncle
- R. Dharshan as the paedophile
- R. Suresh as Suresh, Eeswaran, Vadivel, and Sakthi's friend
- Natturaja Durai as CI N. Dhivakar
- Sindhuja Viji as Ponni's mother
- Jhansi Rangaraj as Police Officer

== Production ==
=== Development ===
"I produced and acted in Chithha because when I read the script and saw what we were making, it made me feel something. I thought that if I could make the whole audience feel that, it would be a very important film. It works in any language because when you see it, you will see it as a human being and not as someone from a particular place or having a certain mother tongue. If the makers do it properly, then the writing takes over."

— Siddharth

Director S. U. Arun Kumar and actor Siddharth initially planned to collaborate on a film after the former's feature debut Pannaiyarum Padminiyum (2014), which did not materialise. In late 2019, after the release of Sindhubaadh (2019), Arun Kumar developed a story idea for six months and eventually met Siddharth for a potential project. However, it was put on hold due to the COVID-19 lockdown in India, during which he thought on how he should execute his ideas perfectly. Arun Kumar then did a course on editing and screenwriting so that he could build a thesis on writing a cohesive screenplay.

The idea of the film was derived from Arun Kumar's experiences as he learnt across several incidents of child sexual abuse through newspapers and articles. Based on that, he wrote a novel titled Kolkata Days which was about the 1996 Suryanelli rape case. Those experiences eventually led him to develop the themes and ideas for this film. He researched across several incidents regarding child sexual abuses that happened in real life and met police offers, NGO members and survivors of child sexual abuse. Based on the extensive research, he drafted 440 pages of the story idea and condensed it to 220 pages after rewrites; the script was then read by his team and their family members.

Besides acting in the lead role, Siddharth also produced the film under Etaki Entertainment. On 17 April 2022, the project was announced under the tentative title Production No. 4 referring to the company's fourth production venture. The official title Chithha was announced in April 2023. The technical crew includes cinematographer Balaji Subramanyam, previously an assistant of Vijay Kartik Kannan; editor Suresh A. Prasad; and art director C. S. Balachander, who worked with Arun Kumar in Pannaiyarum Padminiyum and Sethupathi (2016).

=== Casting and filming ===
According to Arun Kumar, "if the casting is right 80 per cent of the work is done". Nimisha Sajayan was Arun Kumar's first choice for the lead actress; she went to Chennai for the story narration and impressed by it, she immediately agreed to be part of the film, as "Be it the character or the film, I felt it is something that has to come out in today's times." It is her Tamil debut. For the roles of Sundari and Ponni, Arun Kumar auditioned numerous child artists back-to-back before finalising Sahasra Shree and S. Aafiyah Tasneem respectively. Both actors underwent theatre training and performance workshops. Most of the artists featured in the film were newcomers with no acting experience, which led to Arun Kumar and his team conducting workshops to prepare for their roles. Rajesh Balachandran served as the acting coach. Chithha was shot predominantly in and around Palani. Production was complete by April 2023.

== Themes ==
Chithha revolves around the relationship between the paternal uncle and his niece, which is rare in Tamil cinema, as most films explored the maternal uncle's relationship. However, unlike being done in a melodramatic way, Arun Kumar wanted to unfold the relationship drama into a thriller which was the main plot. He revealed that the film revolves around child safety, which he thought that "before I began writing the script, the first line I wrote was that if I had a girl child, Chithha should be a film that the two of us could watch together. That was the rule."

Arun Kumar did not want to portray the abuse from the perpetrator's point of view as it would become uncomfortable for the actor after looking back at the film years later. Instead, he wanted to treat the subject in the most sensitive manner. He wanted the kids to watch the film and learn about it, knowing the fact that the film would be U/A certified. The finished film was showcased to psychiatrists, survivors of sexual abuse, NGO members, and others in the legal jurisdiction system, who approved the film as Arun Kumar did not want to release a film that was problematic in any way in the excuse of cinematic liberty.

Arun Kumar did not mention the usage of words like rape and abuse throughout the film, except for two instances: one scene in which the two characters inquire to the police officer about the incident, and the other which happens in the court. He did not want the term to be used when it was about children. Sajayan's character Shakthi is a sanitation worker, which Arun Kumar had chosen as he was also making a film that featured the sanitation department in the background and "metaphorically the young Sundari has only grown to become Sakthi. Her identity is not that of a rape survivor but a sanitation worker. And no job is inferior. I wanted to put that out there."

Arun Kumar did not want Siddharth's character to take revenge against the paedophile as a heroic act, as according to him, "anybody who helps others or sacrifices is a hero." He said that the film ends with Eeswaran and Sundari on the hospital bed. But he added a couple of scenes, one of which is Sundari after the incident as "her identity did not lie in the hospital bed, but with a smile". Another sequence revolved around the two policemen finding what appears to be the burnt body of the paedophile. Regarding this scene, Arun Kumar said he did not want audiences to think a criminal could "roam freely". Confirming that Siddharth's character was not the killer because it would undo the film's intended message, he revealed this is why he had a police officer saying the killer "could be anyone and that all that matters is the kidnapper being dead", adding that the victim's death could have "even been an accident".

== Music ==
The songs for the film were composed by Dhibu Ninan Thomas and Santhosh Narayanan, while the background score was composed by Vishal Chandrashekhar.

== Release ==
The film's first look was released by actor Kamal Haasan in April 2023. In August 2023, it was announced that the film would be released theatrically on 28 September 2023, with Red Giant Movies distributing the film across Tamil Nadu. Chithha was released alongside Chandramukhi 2 and Iraivan on the same date. It was released in Telugu as Chinna, and in Kannada as Chikku.

Chithha was showcased to school students across various parts of Tamil Nadu and Kerala. The film's promotions for the Kannada version in Bangalore were interrupted due to threats from Karnataka Rakshana Vedike protesters over the Kaveri River water dispute. Prakash Raj and Shiva Rajkumar apologised to Siddharth on behalf of the protestors. The film was not simultaneously released in Telugu along with its Tamil and Kannada versions. After D. Suresh Babu's Asian Cinemas acquired the distribution rights for Chinna, it was released in theatres across Andhra Pradesh and Telangana on 6 October. The film began streaming on Disney+ Hotstar from 28 November 2023, two months after its theatrical release. Chithha was showcased at the Indian Film Festival of Melbourne held from 15 to 25 August 2024.

=== Box office ===
Chithha opened in limited theatres across Tamil Nadu, but following favourable word of mouth, the film's shows and screens were increased. Within the end of the five-day weekend, the film collected ₹11.5 crore (US$1.2 million) at the box office. At the end of the film's theatrical run, the film earned ₹50 crore (US$5.3 million) in its lifetime.

=== Critical reception ===
Chithha received critical acclaim, with praise directed on the performances, screenwriting, direction and themes. Several publications ranked the film as one of the best Tamil films of 2023. (Note: Attributed to multiple references:)

In a four-star rating, Sudhir Srinivasan of Cinema Express called it as "a sensitive, powerful film that breaks conventional rules of heroism." M. Suganth of The Times of India also gave four stars with and wrote "There are also a couple of tender moments amidst all the grimness. A survivor rushing towards a character and giving a hug, and a scene between two friends who have undergone a shared experience forging a stronger bond. It is such profound moments that elevate Chithha into something vital in these times." Kirubhakar Purushothaman of The Indian Express also assigned the same rating, summarising it as "Chithha is one of those rare amalgamations of everything perfect." He also praised Siddharth's performance calling it as "[his] best performance by far" and also the supporting actors for their "stand out" performances. Janani K of India Today gave three-and-a-half stars and wrote "'Chithha' is a much-needed film with a solid message. This is truly a hard-watch but will leave with a good afterthought."

Thinkal Menon of OTTPlay also gave three-and-a-half stars and wrote "Chithha is one of the must-watch films of the year, thanks to the terrific performances from lead actors, intriguing screenplay and the originality with which a sensitive subject is handled." Rajasekar S. of The Federal called it as a "must-watch for its message, exemplary writing and performances." Krishna Selvaseelan of the Tamil Guardian gave three-and-a-half stars and said the film "tears out the viewer's heart and holds it ransom – an impressive feat". Gopinath Rajendran of The Hindu wrote "Handling the sensitive issue of child sexual abuse with care, Chithha marks a befitting resurgence for both its director S. U. Arun Kumar and lead actor Siddharth." Harshini S V of Film Companion called Siddharth's role as his "most affecting performance till date [...] The actor makes it possible for us to go beyond his expressive eyes and get into his head." Akchayaa Rajkumar of The News Minute assigned four out of five and wrote "Chithha is a necessary watch and a masterclass on how movies on child sexual assault can be sensitive and engaging without constantly triggering the audience."

Kamal Haasan, Mani Ratnam, Aishwarya Rajesh, Nayanthara and Silambarasan praised the film for its performances and storytelling. (Note: Attributed to multiple references:) Director Halitha Shameem described it as "the film of the year".

== Accolades ==
Ceremony	Category	Nominees	Result	Ref.
69th Filmfare Awards South	Best Film	Siddharth	Won	
69th Filmfare Awards South	Best Actor	Siddharth	Nominated	
69th Filmfare Awards South	Best Actor (Critics)	Siddharth	Won	
69th Filmfare Awards South	Best Actress	Nimisha Sajayan	Won	
69th Filmfare Awards South	Best Director	S. U. Arun Kumar	Won	
69th Filmfare Awards South	Best Supporting Actress	Anjali Nair	Won	
69th Filmfare Awards South	Best Music Director	Santhosh Narayanan, Dhibu Ninan Thomas	Won	
69th Filmfare Awards South	Best Singer (Male)	Santhosh Narayanan	Nominated	
69th Filmfare Awards South	Best Singer (Female)	Karthika Vaidyanathan	Won	
