= Vansan Movies =

Indian entertainment company

- Type: Entertainment
- Industry: Motion Pictures
- Founded: 2015
- Founder: Shan Sutharsan
- Headquarters: Chennai, India
- Website: https://vansanmovies.com/

Vansan Movies is an Indian entertainment company that specializes in film production, film distribution and live entertainment. The company was founded in 2015 by Shan Sutharsan, CEO of Vansan Group.

== Film production ==
The company's first project titled Sethupathi (2016) directed by S. U. Arun Kumar starred Vijay Sethupathi and Remya Nambeesan in the lead roles. The film released worldwide on 19 February 2016, it received positive reviews from critics and was a commercial success. The production's next release was the comedy film, Enakku Vaaitha Adimaigal (2017), while Radha Mohan's Brindavanam was released in May 2017. Upcoming project Sindhubaadh was announced in March 2018, which revealed that S. U. Arun Kumar is all set to direct another venture starring Vijay Sethupathi as the protagonist and actress Anjali, later Yuvan Shankar Raja was onboard to compose music for the film. Vansan Movies was the Movie Distributor for the 2022 film Ponniyin Selvan Part 1 by Director Mani Ratnam.

== Filmography ==
No	Year	Film	Actors	Director	Language	Notes
1	2016	Sethupathi	Vijay Sethupathi, Remya Nambeesan, Vela Ramamoorthy	S. U Arunkumar	Tamil	
2	2017	Enakku Vaaitha Adimaigal	Jai, Pranitha, Karunakaran, Kaali Venkat, Naveen, Rajendran	Mahendran Rajamani	Tamil	
3	2017	Brindavanam	Arulnithi, Tanya Ravichandran, Vivek	Radha Mohan	Tamil	
4	2019	Sindhubaadh	Vijay Sethupathi, Anjali	S. U Arunkumar	Tamil	
5	2019	Maamanithan	Vijay Sethupathi, Gayathrie	Seenu Ramasamy	Tamil	
