= Brindavanam (2017 film) =

2017 film by Radha Mohan

- Poster
- Directed by: Radha Mohan
- Written by: Pon Parthiban (dialogues)
- Screenplay by: Radha Mohan
- Story by: Radha Mohan
- Produced by: Shan Sutharsan
- Starring: Arulnithi; Vivek; Tanya
- Cinematography: Vivekanand Santhosham
- Edited by: T. S. Jay
- Music by: Vishal Chandrasekhar
- Production company: Vansan Movies
- Distributed by: Orange Creations
- Release date: May 26, 2017
- Country: India
- Language: Tamil

Brindavanam is a 2017 Indian Tamil-language comedy drama film directed by Radha Mohan and produced by Shan Sutharsan. The film stars Arulnithi and Vivek, while Tanya portrays the leading female role. Featuring music composed by Vishal Chandrasekhar, the film began production in August 2016 and was released on 26 May 2017.

== Cast ==
- Arulnithi as Kannan
- Vivek as a fictionalized version of himself
- Tanya as Sandhya
- Thalaivasal Vijay as Sandhya's father
- M. S. Bhaskar as Louis
- Subbu Panchu as Nagaraj
- Sricharan as Motorcycle Driver
- Doubt Senthil as Varky
- Krishnamoorthy as Ramaiah
- Cell Murugan as Mani
- M. V. Tamil Selvi

== Production ==
In June 2016, Shan Sutharsan of Vansan Movies announced that his production studio would simultaneously produce two Tamil films — a project by Radha Mohan and Mahendran Rajamani's Enakku Vaaitha Adimaigal. Arulnithi and Vivek were reported to play leading roles, while newcomer Tanya, granddaughter of actor Ravichandran, was selected as the lead actress. M. S. Prabhu and Vishal Chandrasekhar were revealed as the film's cinematographer and composer, though Prabhu was later replaced by newcomer Vivekanand Santhosham, an erstwhile assistant of P. C. Sriram. Radha Mohan announced actor Vivek would portray himself and the film would be about the bonding between a popular actor and his fan, though distanced reports that the film would be along the lines of the 2016 Hindi film, Fan. To prepare for his role, Arulnithi learnt sign language from an expert for ten days.

The film was officially launched with the title Brindavanam in mid-August 2016, with Vivek planting a tree sapling to commemorate the start of the film's shoot in Sakleshpur, Karnataka. The director revealed that he opted against naming the film Mozhi 2 despite being tempted to, in order to underplay expectations for the film from audiences. Brindavanam was shot for nine days in Sakleshpur, before the team moved to Ooty for a further 35 days to complete the shoot.

== Soundtrack ==
Brindavanam

Soundtrack album by Vishal Chandrasekhar
- Released: 2017
- Length: 10:50
- Language: Tamil
- Label: Vansan Music
- Producer: Vishal Chandrasekhar

Vishal Chandrasekhar chronology
| Sangili Bungili Kadhava Thorae (2017) | Brindavanam (2017) | 7 Naatkal (2017) |

The film's music was composed by Vishal Chandrasekhar and featured three songs, all written by Madhan Karky. The audio rights are secured by Vansan Music, a subsidiary of the production house.

Track list
| No. | Title | Lyrics | Singer(s) | Length |
|---|---|---|---|---|
| 1. | "Giji Giji Saare" | Madhan Karky | Nikhil Mathew, Vivek, Sinduri Vishal | 3:55 |
| 2. | "Shoobi Doobi Dooba" | Madhan Karky | Sharanya Gopinath | 3:25 |
| 3. | "Yaar Nee Yaarada" | Madhan Karky | S. P. Balasubrahmanyam | 3:30 |

== Release ==
The film opened on 26 May 2017 across Tamil Nadu, alongside Samuthirakani's Thondan (2017).The satellite rights of the film were sold to Sun TV. The film received positive reviews, with a critic from The Hindu stating it is "a feel-good film that narrates tales of friendship and love" and that "it has got its vision and mission clear – to be heart-warming, funny and emotional at times". The New Indian Express stated it was a "warm, fuzzy film that works for the most part", while The Hindustan Times stated "it leaves you grinning for the most part and also stirs up an emotional storm within". Likewise, India Today called it a "thoroughly entertaining film", while Sify.com's reviewer wrote that "the importance of family, the enduring bond of brotherhood, and the power of forgiveness in the film will surely make you smile".
