= Sandiyar =

Sandiyar may refer to:

- Sandiyar (2014 film)
- Sandiyar (upcoming film)
- Virumaandi, a 2004 film initially titled Sandiyar

== See also ==
- Varraar Sandiyar, a 1995 film
