= Jayadev (film) =

- Directed by: Jayanth C. Paranjee
- Screenplay by: Jayanth C. Paranjee
- Based on: Sethupathi (Tamil) by S. U. Arun Kumar
- Produced by: K. Ashok Kumar
- Starring: Ghanta Ravi; Malvika Raaj
- Cinematography: Jawahar Reddy
- Edited by: Marthand K. Venkatesh
- Music by: Mani Sharma
- Production company: Sri Lakshmi Venkateswara Creations
- Release date: 30 June 2017
- Country: India
- Language: Telugu

Jayadev is a 2017 Indian Telugu-language action drama film directed by Jayanth C. Paranjee. The film stars newcomer Ghanta Ravi and Malvika Raaj in her lead debut. The film is a remake of the Tamil film Sethupathi (2016).

== Cast ==
- Ghanta Ravi as Jayadev
- Malvika Raaj
- Vinod Kumar as Mastan Raju
- Posani Krishna Murali as IG M. Krishnamurthy
- Pradeep Rawat as a don
- Vennela Kishore
- Ravi Prakash as Srihari
- Siva Reddy as B. V. S. S. N. L. Murthy
- Paruchuri Venkateswara Rao
- Sravan as Mastan Raju's henchman
- Kadambari Kiran

== Production ==
The film marked the debut of Ghanta Ravi and the return of Malvika Raaj to films after Kabhi Khushi Kabhie Gham (2001). A song sequence was shot in Slovenia.

== Soundtrack ==
The audio launch was held on 28 June 2017 with K. Raghavendra Rao, Allu Arjun, and Ganta Srinivasa Rao in attendance.

== Reception ==
Sridhar Adivi of The Times of India rated the film 2.5/5 stars and wrote that Paranjee "sticks to a done-to-death plot and fails to engage the audience that had placed big hopes on this talented director, especially since it is his comeback film of sorts. But alas, Jayadev ends up as a disappointing fare". Murali Krishna CH of Cinema Express wrote, "Jayadev is a deliberate attempt to show that Ghanta Ravi can flex his muscles, shake a leg to peppy numbers, shed some tears while making sure justice is served".
