= BP 180 =

Indian Tamil-language action thriller film

- Theatrical release poster
- Directed by: JP
- Written by: JP
- Produced by: Atul M Bosamiya; Pratik D Chhatbar
- Starring: Tanya Ravichandran; Daniel Balaji; K. Bhagyaraj
- Cinematography: Ramalingam
- Edited by: Elayaraja Sekar
- Music by: Ghibran
- Production companies: Radiant International Films; Atul India Movies
- Distributed by: Uthraa Productions
- Release date: 28 November 2025
- Country: India
- Language: Tamil

BP 180 is a 2025 Indian Tamil-language action thriller film directed by JP and produced by Atul M Bosamiya and Pratik D Chhatbar. The film stars Tanya Ravichandran, Daniel Balaji and K. Bhagyaraj in the lead roles. This is the last movie for Daniel Balaji.

== Synopsis ==
Dr Thangam faces a moral challenge as she navigates a deadly world of crime and medical danger while trying to restore humanity in a ruthless gangster.

== Cast ==
- Tanya Ravichandran as Dr. Thangam
- Daniel Balaji as Arnold
- K. Bhagyaraj as Lingam
- Aruldoss as Maari
- Ravi Prakash as Chandru
- Tamizh as Anbazhagan
- Abinaya N as a dancer in the song "Ulla Vaa"

== Production ==
The film is written and directed by JP and produced by Atul M Bosamiya and Pratik D Chhatbar under the banner Radiant International Films & Atul India Movies. The cinematography is handled by Ramalingam, editing by Elayaraja Sekar, and music composed by Ghibran Vaibodha. The film noted actor Daniel Balaji's last film.

== Reception ==
Abhinav Subramanian of The Times of India gave 2.5/5 stars and wrote "The film manages to engage you intermittently, enough to wonder if it'll deliver. Arnold's obsession feels hollow, Dr. Thangam's stubbornness borders on absurd, and the plot mechanics grind forward without ever earning emotional investment." Rohini M of Cinema Express gave 2.5/5 stars and wrote "Despite its flaws, BP 180 is a good attempt with solid performances, strong moments, and an engaging first half."
