= Omprakash Zindabaad =

- Directed by: Ranjit Rauniyar
- Written by: Vishal Vijay Kumar
- Screenplay by: Vishal Vijay kumar
- Story by: Vishal Vijay Kumar
- Produced by: Khalid Kidwai; Madhav Chitale (co-producer)
- Starring: Om Puri; Kulbhushan Kharbanda, Zakir Hussain; Ram Sethi; Seema Azmi; Shweta Bhardwaj; Jagdeep
- Cinematography: Naren Gedia
- Edited by: Dilip Dev
- Music by: Siddhant Mishra; Repul Sharma; Vipin Patva; Dev Sikdar
- Production company: Atlantic Adventure Limited
- Release date: 18 December 2020
- Country: India
- Language: Hindi

Omprakash Zindabaad (transl. Victory to Omprakash) is a 2020 Hindi-language film produced by Khalid Kidwai, starring Om Puri, it was previously titled Rambhajjan Zindabad. Initially scheduled to release in February 2017, it was released on 18 December 2020 after several delays.

== Cast ==
- Om Puri as compounder Omprakash
- Kulbhushan Kharbanda as Raja Sahab
- Zakir Hussain (actor) as MLA Sisupalbabu
- Ram Sethi as village head
- Jagdeep
- Abhay Joshi as Rambhajan
- Seema Azmi as Rambhajan's wife Parwatiya
- Khushboo Kamal as News Express reporter
- Shweta Bhardwaj as Dilli Rani
- Jay Shanker Pandey as taangewala
- Rajkumar Kanojia as Jhamman
- Istiyak Khan as Gouri Shankar
- Sayeeda Jaffery as Rani Sahiba
- Madhav Chitale as DM Saheb
