= Raqt =

- Directed by: Adi Irani; Shiva Rindan
- Written by: Adi Irani; Shiva Rindan; Ranjeev Verma
- Produced by: Amit Mishra; Ashish Mishra
- Starring: Shweta Bhardwaj; Sheena Shahabadi; Farida Jalal; Gulshan Grover
- Cinematography: Nirmal Jani
- Music by: Daboo Malik
- Distributed by: Multimedia Combines
- Release date: 27 September 2013
- Running time: 127 Min
- Country: India
- Language: Hindi

Raqt is a 2013 Indian Hindi psychological thriller film produced by Ashish Mishra & Amit Mishra and directed by Adi Irani & Shiva Rindan. The film stars Shweta Bhardwaj, Arjun Mahajan, Sheena Sahabadi and Gulshan Grover in lead roles and was released on 27 September 2013.

== Plot ==
The film revolves around Sonia (played by Sweta Bharadwaj) and Suhani (played by Sheena Shahabadi). The film is about the fatal obsession of an adopted daughter for her mother's affection.

Sonia is a single mother who adopts her sister's daughter when her sister and brother-in-law die in an accident due to her carelessness. Sonia, along with her maid Maria (Farida Jalal), pampers Suhani to not let her miss her parents. But this has an opposite effect with Suhani, with her developing an obsessive relationship with Sonia. She will let nothing come between her and her mother.

Unaware of her child's problem, Sonia becomes a career-woman not focusing on her personal life beyond Suhani. She becomes a successful heroine. One day, Suhani sees Sonia and a friend arguing. She kills him, and Sonia takes the blame and is jailed for seven years.

== Cast ==
- Gulshan Grover as Prince Ranbir Singh
- Shakti Kapoor
- Shweta Bhardwaj as Sonia
- Sheena Shahabadi as Suhani
- Farida Jalal as Maria
- Suhani Tak
- Adi Irani as Police Officer
- Suresh Menon

== Soundtrack ==
Rakt

Soundtrack album by Daboo Malik
- Released: 15 September 2013
- Genre: Feature film soundtrack
- Length: 26:12
- Language: Hindi
- Label: Yellow & Red Music
External audio
- Audio Jukebox on YouTube

The soundtrack of Rakt consists of 6 songs composed by Daboo Malik while the lyrics of which written by Panchhi Jalonvi.

Tracklist
No.	Title	Singer(s)	Length
1.	"Raqt"	Amaal Mallik & Suzanne D'Mello	04:24
2.	"Tu Hi Tu"	Shaan & Akriti Kakkar	04:39
3.	"Maula"	Shadab Faridi	04:37
4.	"Mujhe Mili"	Sunidhi Chauhan	04:50
5.	"Tu Hi Hai" (Sad)	Amaal Mallik	03:08
6.	"Tu Hi Hai" (Reprise)	Amal Malik & Akriti Kakkar	04:31
Total length:			26:12
