= News J =

Indian Tamil-language television channel

- Country: India
- Network: Mantaro Network Private Limited
- Headquarters: Chennai, Tamil Nadu, India

Programming
- Language: Tamil
- Picture format: 1080i (HD)

Ownership
- Key people: W. Thanigai Velan (CEO)

History
- Launched: 14 November 2018
- Founder: Edappadi K. Palaniswami

Links
- Website: www.newsj.tv

News J is all year round Tamil news broadcasting channel headquartered at Nungambakkam in Chennai, Tamil Nadu and is run by Mantaro Network Private Limited, founded by Former Chief Minister of Tamil Nadu Edappadi K.Palaniswami, C.Ve.Radhaakrishnen, S.Dineshkumar, A.Vivek and K.Kubenthiran,.. from Tamil Nadu. It is named after late AIADMK supremo J. Jayalalithaa.

This channel was launched on 14 November 2018 as a replacement of Jaya TV News. W. Hansraj Saxena was the First CEO of the Channel.
