= Mupparimanam =

Indian Tamil romantic thriller film by Adhiroopan

- Poster
- Directed by: Adhiroopan
- Written by: Adhiroopan
- Produced by: Pollachi V. Visu; Pollachi Gold V. Kumar
- Starring: Shanthanu Bhagyaraj; Srushti Dange; Skanda Ashok
- Cinematography: Rasamathi
- Edited by: Vivek Harshan
- Music by: G. V. Prakash Kumar
- Production company: Shamayalaya Creations
- Distributed by: Sri Thenandal Films
- Release date: 3 March 2017
- Country: India
- Language: Tamil

Mupparimanam (transl. Three Dimensions) is a 2017 Indian Tamil language romantic thriller film written and directed by Adhiroopan. The film stars Shanthanu Bhagyaraj and Srushti Dange, with Skanda Ashok, Ravi Prakash and Thambi Ramaiah in supporting roles. Featuring music composed by G. V. Prakash Kumar and cinematography by Rasamathi, the film began production during late 2015, and was released on 3 March 2017.

== Cast ==
- Shanthanu Bhagyaraj as Kathir
- Srushti Dange as Anusha
- Skanda Ashok as Santhosh
- Thambi Ramaiah as Boat Owner
- Samuthirakani as Siraivaasan
- Florent Pereira as Anusha's father
- Ravi Prakash as Anusha's uncle
- Mohana as Anusha's aunt
- Charle as Porchezhiyan
- Appukutty as Logu
- Swaminathan as Arivudai
- Lollu Sabha Manohar as Nambirajan
- P. V. Chandramouli as Vigneshwaran
- Kalyani Natarajan as Kathir's mother
- Rekha Suresh as Anusha's mother
- Avis Manoj Kumar as Kathir's friend
- Divyabharathi as Anusha's friend
- C. M. Bala as Police Inspector

Special appearances as themselves in the song "Let's Go Party" (in alphabetical order)

- Aari Arujunan
- Aishwarya Rajesh
- Arya
- Ashok Selvan
- Bobby Simha
- Jackie Shroff
- Janani Iyer
- K. Bhagyaraj
- Kalaiyarasan
- Keerthi
- Krish
- Pandiarajan
- Parthiban
- Poornima Bhagyaraj
- Prabhu
- Prasanna
- Premji Amaren
- Prithvi Rajan
- Radhika Sarathkumar
- Rajendran
- Ramya Krishnan
- Sangeetha
- Soori
- Venkat Prabhu
- Vidharth
- Vijay Antony
- Vivek

== Production ==
Shanthanu Bhagyaraj signed on to work on the project directed by Adhiroopan, an erstwhile assistant to Bala, in early 2015 and stated that he hoped the film "would resurrect his career". Athiroopan revealed that he was encouraged by Vetrimaaran to make his first venture and picked Shanthanu as the script required an actor who could also dance, while also revealing that the film was based on a real-life character. He also stated that it took seven years to perfect the script. Shanthanu described the film as his "comeback" and banked on the project heavily to revitalise his career as an actor after a series of unsuccessful films. Actress Srushti Dange revealed that it was the toughest role in her career, and at times, wanted to quit after being unable to sync with the director's expectations. The crew shot in places including Pollachi, Challakudy and Alleppey and only revealed the title of the project to the media in March 2016. A song featuring several actors in guest appearances was shot for close to three months in several takes at Mohan Studios in Chennai, before finishing in June 2016. Composer G. V. Prakash Kumar worked on the film despite his acting commitments, and took fifty five days for the re-recording work.

== Soundtrack ==
Mupparimanam

Soundtrack album by G. V. Prakash Kumar
- Released: 14 February 2017
- Recorded: 2015–16
- Genre: Feature film soundtrack
- Language: Tamil
- Label: Trend Music
- Producer: G. V. Prakash Kumar

G. V. Prakash Kumar chronology
Kadavul Irukaan Kumaru (2016)	Mupparimanam (2017)	Lens (2017)

Featuring five songs from G. V. Prakash Kumar, the film's soundtrack was released by actor Rajinikanth on 12 February 2017. Prior to the release of the album, a promotional song titled "Let's Go Party" was unveiled by A. R. Rahman on Twitter. Despite his busy acting commitments, G. V. Prakash Kumar had kept his word of composing music for Adhiroopan's first film, following the pair's association during the making of Bala-directional Paradesi (2013).

Track listing
No.	Title	Lyrics	Singer(s)	Length
1.	"Let's Go Party"	Na. Muthukumar	G.V. Prakash Kumar, Varun Parandhaman, MC Vickey	4:23
2.	"Sokki Poraandi"	Na. Muthukumar	Al Rufian, Maalavika Sundar	5:19
3.	"Kannodu Kannodu"	Kabilan	Sathyaprakash	5:07
4.	"Uyirile Uyirile"	Yugabharathi	Vijay Prakash	4:36
5.	"Yaar Ivano"	Na. Muthukumar	Santhosh Hariharan	2:58

== Release ==
The satellite rights of the film were sold to Vasanth TV. The film opened to mixed reviews from film critics, with Deccan Chronicle suggesting "the film starts in a thrilling manner but fizzles out soon". On a positive note, Behindwoods.com stated "on the whole, director Adhiroopan definitely has what it takes to make an engaging thriller film with well-written family based emotional scenes, but he has given a lot of importance to commercial aspects like love, songs, and comedy which dilutes the impact that could have been created" and that "also, with the majority twists kept for the last few minutes, a finish with a bang is lacking and leaves the audiences with a half baked cake". Sify.com called the film "yet another wasted opportunity, dished out in Kollywood", concluding it was "tiring", while TheNewsMinute.com wrote "the film has an exciting screenplay but it is mired in regressive ideas about love and relationships". Baradwaj Rangan of Film Companion wrote "The leads put in valiant performances, but a film with so much love and loss should have made us feel so much more. "
