= Indumathi (film) =

Indian Telugu-language comedy thriller film

- DVD cover
- Directed by: Harsha P Reddy
- Written by: Harsha P Reddy
- Produced by: Harsha P Reddy
- Starring: Shweta Bhardwaj: Sivaji; Bharath Reddy; Harsha Vardhan; Vennela Kishore; Satyam Rajesh; Vijay Sai; Noel Sean
- Cinematography: Vasu
- Edited by: Shankar
- Music by: Anand
- Production company: Geomedia Arts
- Release date: 1 January 2009
- Country: India
- Language: Telugu

Indumathi is a 2009 Indian Telugu-language comedy thriller film directed by Harsha P Reddy and starring Shweta Bhardwaj and Sivaji with Bharath Reddy, Harsha Vardhan, Vennela Kishore, Satyam Rajesh, Vijay Sai and Noel Sean in important roles. The film is inspired by the American film Psycho (1960).

== Cast ==
- Shweta Bhardwaj as Honey
- Sivaji as Chandu
- Bharath Reddy as Raj
- Harsha Vardhan as Anand
- Vennela Kishore as Kishore
- Satyam Rajesh as Rajesh
- Vijay Sai as Banti
- Noel Sean as Sheshi
- Srinivasa Reddy as Reliance worker
- Shankar Melkote as Honey's boss
- Raghu Babu as Police officer
- Giri Babu as Police officer
- Ravi Prakash as Investigating officer
- Harsha as Private detective

== Production ==
The director, a NRI, previously produced Andaru Dongale Dorikite (2004). Vennela Kishore learned about the role through his friend Ravi Varma. The film was shot in Hyderabad.

== Soundtrack ==
The music was composed by Anand, who composed the music for the 2007 film Mantra, in which Sivaji also starred.

== Reception ==
A critic from Idlebrain.com wrote that "Indumathi is a kind of film that is made with the purpose of entertainment by leaving the basic plot aside". A critic from Full Hyderabad wrote that "Indumathi is a disaster from the word go". A critic form Indiaglitz wrote that "Though there are a few pits in the story and screenplay department, Indumathi undisputedly has the potential to thrill audiences".
