= Skanda Ashok =

Indian actor

- Born: 26 April 1986 (age 40); Chikmagalur, Karnataka, India
- Occupation: Actor
- Years active: 2006 – present
- Spouse: Shikha Prasad (m. 2018)

Skanda Ashok (born 26 April 1986) is an Indian actor who has appeared in Kannada, Malayalam, Tamil and Telugu films. He made his breakthrough playing Sooraj Menon in the coming-of-age Malayalam film, Notebook (2006), before gaining critical acclaim for his performances in the thriller films Elektra (2010) and the bilingual horror Chaarulatha (2012).

== Film career ==
Skanda made his acting debut in the coming-of-age Malayalam film, Notebook (2006), after being spotted by director Rosshan Andrews in commercials. The film featured him alongside actresses Parvathy, Roma and Mariya Roy, with Skanda appearing as the boyfriend of Mariya's character. Notebook performed well at the box office, and the success of the film saw Skanda alternatively credited as Sooraj, his character's name, for his following Malayalam films. He then moved on to feature in a secondary lead role in the Malayalam film Positive (2008), before playing the lead role in Malli Malli (2009), a Telugu romantic film co-starring Kalyani. However both films did not perform well at the box office, while another Tamil film titled Sandrom was shelved after it shoot. Skanda then made a comeback by featuring in the critically acclaimed horror film Elektra (2010), featuring alongside Prakash Raj, Manisha Koirala and Nayanthara. He has since worked on films including the bilingual horror film Chaarulatha (2012), the Kannada thriller film U Turn (2016) and as the second lead actor in Mupparimanam (2017).

In 2017, he moved onto work in television serials, first appearing in Radha Ramana.

== Filmography ==
| Year | Film | Role | Language | Notes |
|---|---|---|---|---|
| 2006 | Notebook | Sooraj Menon | Malayalam | Asianet Film Award for Best New Face of the Year (Male) |
| 2008 | Positive | Raju | Malayalam | |
| 2009 | Malli Malli | Nandu | Telugu | |
| 2010 | Elektra | Edwin | Malayalam | |
| 2012 | Chaarulatha | Ravi | Kannada; Tamil | |
| 2014 | Angusam | Shiva | Tamil | |
| 2016 | U Turn | Ritesh | Kannada | |
| 2017 | Mupparimanam | Santosh | Tamil | |
| 2018 | Kaanoorayana | | Kannada | |
| 2021 | Jigri Dost | | Kannada | |
| 2022 | Flat #9 | Yashwanth | Kannada | |
| 2024 | Barbarika | | Kannada | |
| 2024 | Bhairadevi | | Kannada | |

== Television ==
| Year | Program | Role | Language | Channel | Notes |
|---|---|---|---|---|---|
| 2009 | Super Dancer Jn | celebrity Judge | Malayalam | Amrita TV | Reality Show |
| 2016 | Agnisakshi | Raman (Sidharth's friend) | Kannada | Colors Kannada | Serial (Cameo) |
| 2017 | Lakshmi Baramma | Raman (Chandan's friend) | Kannada | Colors Kannada | Serial (Cameo) |
| 2017 – 2019 | Radha Ramana | Raman | Kannada | Colors Kannada | Serial, Won 2017 Colors Kannada Anubandha Awards 1)Jana mechchida Jodi with Shwetha R Prasad(Popular television couple) 2)Mane mechchida maga(Best Son on screen) |
| 2020- 2021 | Sarasu | Dr. Aravind | Kannada | Star Suvarna | Serial |
| 2021 | Satya | | Kannada | Zee Kannada | Serial |
| 2021 | Radhe Shyama | Ashok | Kannada | Star Suvarna | Serial |
| 2023 | Avanu Matte Shravani | Abhimanyu "Abhi" | Kannada | Star Suvarna | Serial |

== Awards ==
Asianet Film Awards

- 2006 - Asianet Award for Best Male New Face of the Year - Notebook

Colors TV Anubandha Awards

- 2017 - Jana Mecchinda Jodi with Shwetha R Prasad - Radha Ramana
- 2017 - Mane Mecchinda Maga(Best Son on screen) - Radha Ramana
- 2019 - Jana Mecchinda Nayaka Award - Radha Ramana
