= Balle Vellaiyathevaa =

2016 Indian film by P. Solai Prakash

- Theatrical release poster
- Directed by: P. Solai Prakash
- Written by: P. Solai Prakash
- Produced by: Sasikumar
- Starring: Sasikumar; Tanya Ravichandran; Rohini; Kovai Sarala
- Cinematography: Ravindranatha Guru
- Edited by: Praveen Antony
- Music by: Darbuka Siva
- Production company: Company Productions
- Release date: 23 December 2016
- Country: India
- Language: Tamil

Balle Vellaiyathevaa is a 2016 Indian Tamil-language comedy drama film written and directed by P. Solai Prakash in his debut. The film was produced by Sasikumar, who also stars in the lead role, alongside Tanya Ravichandran, while Rohini and Kovai Sarala appear in supporting roles. The music was composed by Darbuka Siva with cinematography by Ravindranatha Guru and editing by Praveen Antony. The film was released on 23 December 2016.

== Plot ==
Sakthi moves to a new village after his mother, a postmaster, gets transferred. He befriends a childless couple and falls in love with Thanikodi, a butcher's daughter.

== Cast ==
- Sasikumar as Sakthi
- Tanya Ravichandran as Thanikodi
- Rohini as Sakthi's mother
- Kovai Sarala as Kathai
- Sangili Murugan
- Bala Singh
- Leesha Eclairs

== Production ==
Following the release of Kidaari (2016), Sasikumar announced that he would produce and star in a film to be directed by newcomer Prakash. The film began production in mid September 2016. It was completed in a single schedule of 50 days, taking place mainly in Theni. The title Balle Vellaiyathevaa was derived from a dialogue in Veerapandiya Kattabomman (1959).

== Soundtrack ==
The music was composed by Darbuka Siva. Karthik of Milliblog wrote, "Darbuka Siva's second outing is a surprisingly middling effort, particularly coming after the wonderful Kidari!".

Track listing
No.	Title	Singer(s)	Length
1.	"Aasa Theera Aadikkalam"	Kovai Sarala, Sathyaprakash	4:06
2.	"Balle Vellaiya Thevaa"	Sathyaprakash, Shilpa Natarajan	3:06
3.	"Kan Vatchutta"	Haricharan, Sanjana Divaker Kalmanje	3:54
4.	"Balle Vellaiya Thevaa" (Club Mix)	Sathyaprakash, Shilpa Natarajan	3:06
Total length:			14:12

== Release and reception ==
Balle Vellaiyatheva was released on 23 December 2016, having been brought forward from early 2017.

Film critic Baradwaj Rangan wrote for The Hindu, "There's no effort in any department of filmmaking, and we're just left with the sight of M Sasikumar angling for an easy B/C-centre hit. No one can grudge him that, and not every film can be a [Subramaniapuram], but is a little quality control too much to expect?". M. Suganth of The Times of India wrote, "Bale Vellaya Theva wants to be a simple rural comedy with minimal stakes, but what it eventually turns out to be is a plotless film where neither the comedy nor the drama works". Samayam gave the film a rating of 2 stars out of 5.
