= W. Hansraj Saxena =

Indian business executive

W.Hansraj Saxena
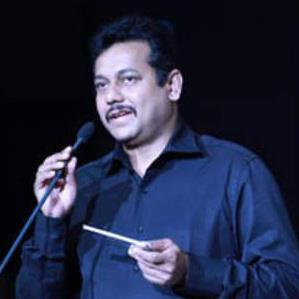
- W Hansraj Saxena during Enthiran Audio launch
- Born: Chennai, India
- Education: Loyola College
- Occupations: Film producer, Former Deputy Managing Director of Sun Pictures
- Years active: 1993–present
- Known for: Management of Media and Entertainment

W. Hansraj Saxena is the CEO of the News J Channel. He is the former Deputy Managing Director of Sun Pictures, an Indian film distribution and production company, subsidiary of Sun Group and a division of Sun TV Network.

== Early life ==
Hansraj Saxena holds a bachelor's degree in physics from Loyola College, Chennai. When he joined Sun Group, he was employed as a manager of Kungumam magazine.

== Sun TV Network ==
He joined worked in Sun TV Network and their flagship channel, Sun TV. His responsibilities include the production of all in-house programming, overall channel development, brand positioning, promotional activities, content management, market and competitor research and strategic planning. He also became a key person and Deputy Managing Director of Sun Pictures and was responsible for acquiring film distribution rights.

== Sun Pictures ==
He headed Sun Pictures is a film distribution and production studio unit of Chennai based Sun Network owned by Kalanidhi Maran started producing the TV film and distributing low-budget Tamil-language films, Kadhalil Vizhunthen being the first. Later, it went on to become one of the most powerful production, distribution houses in Tamil Cinema.

== Sax Pictures ==
He started his own film production banner Sax Pictures in 2012 after quitting Sun TV.

== News J ==
In 2018, He became the CEO of the newly launched News J Channel.

== Filmography ==
He Handled the following projects in Sun Pictures.

=== Produced by Sun Pictures ===
Year	Film	Director	Cast	Notes
2010	Enthiran	Shankar	Rajinikanth, Aishwarya Rai, Danny Denzongpa	Won, Edison Award for Best Film; Won, Vijay Award for Favourite Film; Nominated, Filmfare Award for Best Film - Tamil

=== Distributed by Sun Pictures ===
As distributor
Year	Film	Director	Cast
2008	Kadhalil Vizhunthen	P. V. Prasad	Nakul, Sunaina
2008	Thenavattu	V. V. Kadhir	Jeeva, Poonam Bajwa
2008	Dindigul Sarathy	Siva sanmukam	Karunas, Karthika
2009	Padikathavan	Suraj	Dhanush, Tamannaah Bhatia
2009	Thee	Kicha	Sundar C, Ragini, Namitha
2009	Ayan	K. V. Anand	Suriya, Tamannaah Bhatia
2009	Maasilamani	R. N. R. Manohar	Nakul, Sunaina
2009	Ninaithale Inikkum	G. N. R. Kumaravelan	Prithviraj, Sakthi Vasu, Priyamani
2009	Kanden Kadhalai	R. Kannan	Bharath, Tamannaah Bhatia
2009	Vettaikaaran	Babu Sivan	Vijay, Anushka Shetty
2010	Theeradha Vilaiyattu Pillai	Thiru	Vishal Krishna, Sarah-Jane Dias, Neetu Chandra, Tanushree Dutta
2010	Sura	S. P. Rajkumar	Vijay, Tamannaah Bhatia
2010	Singam	Hari	Suriya, Anushka Shetty
2010	Thillalangadi	M. Raja	Jayam Ravi, Shaam, Tamannaah Bhatia
2010	Enthiran	S. Shankar	Rajinikanth, Aishwarya Rai
2011	Aadukalam	Vetrimaran	Dhanush, Taapsee Pannu
2011	Mappillai	Suraj	Dhanush, Hansika Motwani
2011	Engeyum Kaadhal	Prabhu Deva	Jayam Ravi, Hansika Motwani

== Sax Pictures ==
Hansraj Saxena was back to the industry with his new banner Sax Pictures. He is Producing and distributing Movies with his new banner.

=== Distribution ===
Sax Pictures Distribution
Year	Film	Director	Cast
2012	Chaarulatha	Ponkumaran	Priyamani, Skanda

=== Production ===
Sax Pictures Production
Year	Film	Director	Cast
2012	Shivani	Sai Gokul	Chandru, Kavya Shetty
