= Kobali =

Indian crime drama television series

- Genre: Crime; Drama
- Created by: Revanth Levaka
- Screenplay by: Revanth Levaka
- Story by: Revanth Levaka; Jeevan Bandi; Rajasekhar Reddy; Kammireddy
- Directed by: Revanth Levaka
- Starring: Ravi Prakash; Syamala; Bharath Reddy; Rocky Singh; Tarun Rohith
- Music by: Gowra Hari
- Country of origin: India
- Original language: Telugu
- No. of seasons: 1
- No. of episodes: 8

Production
- Executive producers: Revanth Levaka; Mahesh Babu Daggumilli
- Producers: Jyothi Meghavath Rathod; Raja Sekhar Reddy Kammireddy; Tirupati Srinivasa Rao
- Cinematography: Rohit Bachu
- Editor: Kishore Maddali
- Running time: 25–30 minutes
- Production companies: Nimbus Films India; U1 Productions; TSR Movie Makers Studios

Original release
- Network: Disney+ Hotstar
- Release: 4 February 2025

Kobali is a 2025 Indian Telugu-language crime drama television series created and directed by Revanth Levaka. The series features Ravi Prakash, Syamala, Bharath Reddy, Rocky Singh and Tarun Rohith in primary roles.

It was released on 4 February 2025 on Disney+ Hotstar.

== Cast ==
- Ravi Prakash as Srinu
- Syamala as Meena
- Bharath Reddy as Dr. Krishna
- Rocky Singh as Ramana
- Tarun Rohith as Ramu
- Venkat as Jagjeevan Takur
- Anand Ravi as Paidiraju
- Yog Khatri as Principal
- Gaddam Naveen as Murthy
- Sagar Majji as Shabir
- Manikanta as Raju
- Sukku Reddy as Kaasi

== Episodes ==
No.	Title	Directed by	Written by	Original release date
1	"The Shadows of the Past"	Revanth Levaka	Revanth Levaka; Jeevan Bandi; Rajasekhar Reddy; Kammireddy	4 February 2025
2	"The Drug Lead"	Revanth Levaka	Revanth Levaka; Jeevan Bandi; Rajasekhar Reddy; Kammireddy	4 February 2025
3	"The Betrayal"	Revanth Levaka	Revanth Levaka; Jeevan Bandi; Rajasekhar Reddy; Kammireddy	4 February 2025
4	"The First Strike"	Revanth Levaka	Revanth Levaka; Jeevan Bandi; Rajasekhar Reddy; Kammireddy	4 February 2025
5	"The Desperation"	Revanth Levaka	Revanth Levaka; Jeevan Bandi; Rajasekhar Reddy; Kammireddy	4 February 2025
6	"The Hunt Begins"	Revanth Levaka	Revanth Levaka; Jeevan Bandi; Rajasekhar Reddy; Kammireddy	4 February 2025
7	"The Reckoning"	Revanth Levaka	Revanth Levaka; Jeevan Bandi; Rajasekhar Reddy; Kammireddy	4 February 2025
8	"The Confrontation"	Revanth Levaka	Revanth Levaka; Jeevan Bandi; Rajasekhar Reddy; Kammireddy	4 February 2025

== Music ==
The background score and soundtrack was composed by Gowra Hari, with a special song "Lilly" composed by Siva Prasad Imandi. The audio rights were acquired by Sony Music India. The special song "Lilly" was released on 31 January 2025.

Track listing
No.	Title	Lyrics	Music	Singer(s)	Length
1.	"Nissabdham"	Gowra Hari	Gowra Hari	Gowra Hari
2.	"Kobali Theme"		Gowra Hari
3.	"Lilly"	Viswanath Karasala	Siva Prasad Imandi	Meghanaa Naidu Dasari

== Reception ==
Sakshi Post rated it 2 out of 5 and was critical of weak storyline and shallow screenplay, while praised the performance of Ravi Prakash and Rocky Singh. Avad Mohammad of OTTPlay too gave the same rating and felt that the excessive use of foul language is a drawback and the characters are not given proper arcs.

== See also ==
- List of Disney+ Hotstar original programming
