= Bharath Reddy (actor) =

Indian actor

- Born: October 22, 1978 (age 47); Tirupati, Andhra Pradesh, India
- Education: Yerevan State Medical University
- Occupations: Cardiologist; Actor
- Years active: 2006–present
- Spouse: Manila Gupta
- Children: 2

Bharath Reddy is an Indian actor who appears in Telugu and Tamil language films. A cardiologist by profession, Reddy had his acting breakthrough portraying a police officer in Chakri Toleti's Tamil–Telugu bilingual film Unnaipol Oruvan / Eenadu (2009).

== Career ==
Bharath Reddy was born in Chandragiri, a suburb of Tirupathi, Andhra Pradesh. He was brought up in Chennai, completing his schooling from La Chateline Residential Junior College. He completed his medical degree from Yerevan State Medical University, in Armenia, and then went on to complete his diploma in Cardiology. He started working as a Junior Consulting Cardiologist at Apollo Hospitals, Elbit Medical Diagnostics, and Century Hospital in Hyderabad.

He did close to a dozen films in walk-in roles and in characters as a villain's henchman, before being noticed for his work in J. D. Chakravarthy's Siddham (2009). After being impressed by his performance in that film, Chakri Toleti selected him to play a police officer in his bilingual film Unnaipol Oruvan, where Bharath was able to act with veteran actors Mohanlal, Kamal Haasan and Venkatesh. Since then he has appeared in notable Telugu films including the Nagarjuna-starrers Ragada and Greeku Veerudu, as well as playing a role in Mahesh Babu's Businessman. He has also worked in Tamil films including as a police officer in Radha Mohan's Payanam, Ragalaipuram and most recently, Idhu Kathirvelan Kadhal as Udhayanidhi Stalin's brother-in-law and then he appeared in Karthi's Thozha/ Oopiri is directed by Vamshi Paidipally later he played pivotal roles in Malayalam, Tamil, Telugu, Kannada and Hindi Launguages respectively.

== Filmography ==
=== Telugu films ===
List of Telugu films and roles
Year	Title	Role	Notes
2006	Oka V Chitram	Bharath	
2006	Rakhi	Bharat's friend	
2006	Khatarnak	Lawyer's assistant	
2007	Evadaithe Nakenti	Eve Teaser	
2008	Jalsa		
2008	Ready	Gautham	
2009	Indumathi	Raj	
2009	Siddham	Akhil	
2009	Malli Malli		
2009	Eenadu	Gautham Reddy	
2009	Kavya's Diary	Kiran	
2009	Saleem	Satyavati's fake groom	
2009	Village Lo Vinayakudu	Bharath Verma	
2010	Ragada	Peddanna's sidekick	
2010	Broker	Inspector Surya	
2010	Chikati Lo Nenu	Vikram	
2011	Gaganam	Nawaz Khan	
2012	Businessman	Inspector Bharath	
2012	Rebel	Jayram's son	
2013	Greeku Veerudu	Bharath	
2013	Attarintiki Daredi	Rohit	
2013	Dasami	CI Shastry	
2013	Kiss	Ravi	
2014	Galipatam	Ram	
2014	Loukyam	Bharath	
2014	Oka Laila Kosam	Karthik's brother-in-law	
2014	Aagadu	Human Rights Officer	
2014	Paisa	Saradhi	
2015	Jil	Ali	
2016	Oopiri	Doctor	
2016	Right Right	Bhaskar	
2016	Banthi Poola Janaki		
2017	Raja the Great	Police Officer	
2017	Ghazi	B. Sanjay S21	
2017	Lakshmi Bomb	Rahul	
2018	Savyasachi	Siri's husband	
2018	Amar Akbar Anthony	Mareddy	
2019	N. T. R.: Kathanayakudu	Daggubati Venkateswara Rao	
2019	N.T.R: Mahanayakudu	Daggubati Venkateswara Rao	
2019	118	Police officer K. Ravindra	
2019	Chitralahari	Bharath	
2019	Chanakya	Home Minister's PA	
2019	Prati Roju Pandage	Dr. Bharath	
2020	Disco Raja	Subbu	
2022	Ghani	Yusuf	
2022	Bimbisara	Subramanya Shastri's father	
2022	Godfather	Ram Prasad	
2022	Focus	Inspector	
2023	Vinaro Bhagyamu Vishnu Katha	NIA officer Ajay	
2023	Ravanasura	Dr Dinesh	
2023	Bhagavanth Kesari	Trainer	
2023	7:11PM	Krishna	
2023	Kushi		
2024	Naa Saami Ranga	Peddayya’s second son	
2025	Game Changer	Adnan's brother	
2025	Hathya	Kiran Reddy	
2025	Arjun Son Of Vyjayanthi	Prakash’s assistant	

=== Tamil films ===
List of Tamil films and roles
Year	Title	Role	Notes
2009	Unnaipol Oruvan	Sethuraman	
2011	Payanam	Nawaz Khan	
2013	Ragalaipuram	SI Suresh	
2014	Idhu Kathirvelan Kadhal	Shanmugam	
2016	Thozha	Doctor	
2016	Ko 2	ACP Arivazhagan	
2016	Bayam Oru Payanam	Ram	
2016	Achamindri	AC Saravanan	
2017	Ivan Thanthiran	Bharath	
2017	Vivegam	Bharath	
2018	60 Vayadu Maaniram	ACP Badrinath	
2018	Thuppakki Munai	Ganga	
2019	Viswasam	Swetha's coach	
2019	Action	Bharath Rao	
2020	Mafia: Chapter 1	Naveen	
2020	Biskoth	Ganesh	
2021	Thalaivii	Party member	
2021	Singa Paarvai		
2023	Varisu	Police Officer	

=== Other language films ===
List of other language films and roles
Year	Title	Role	Language
2012	Bheema Theeradalli	SP Bharath	Kannada
2017	The Ghazi Attack	B. Sanjay S21	Hindi
2021	Thalaivii	Party member	Hindi

=== Television ===
Year	Title	Role	Network	Language
2020	Expiry Date		ZEE5	Hindi; Telugu
2025	Kobali	Dr. Krishna	Disney+ Hotstar	Telugu
