= Elektra (2010 film) =

2010 film by Shyamaprasad

- Theatrical poster
- Directed by: Shyamaprasad
- Screenplay by: Shyamaprasad; Kiran Prabhakar
- Produced by: N. B. Vindhyan
- Starring: Nayanthara; Manisha Koirala; Prakash Raj; Biju Menon; Skanda Ashok
- Cinematography: Sanu Varghese
- Edited by: Vinod Sukumaran
- Music by: Alphons Joseph
- Distributed by: Rasika Entertainment
- Release date: 24 November 2010 (IFFI)
- Country: India
- Language: Malayalam

Elektra is a 2010 Indian Malayalam-language psychological drama film co-written and directed by Shyamaprasad, starring Nayanthara, Manisha Koirala, Prakash Raj, Biju Menon, and Skanda Ashok. It was produced by N. B. Vindhyan, who also produced Shyamaprasad's Ore Kadal (2007).

The film is based on the story of the Greek mythological character Electra, although it has a contemporary setting in an aristocratic family in Kerala. It draws strongly on four adaptations of the myth: Electra by Sophocles, Electra by Euripides, Oresteia by Aeschylus and Mourning Becomes Electra by Eugene O’Neill (1931). Key to the film is the concept of the Electra complex; a daughter's psychosexual competition with her mother for her father's affection.

The film premiered at the International Film Festival of India in November 2010. It made its international premiere at the 7th Dubai International Film Festival.

== Cast ==
- Nayanthara as Elektra Alexander
- Manisha Koirala as Diana
- Prakash Raj as Abraham and Jossya Issac (Double Role)
- Skanda Ashok as Edwin
- Biju Menon as Peter
- P. Sreekumar as Fr. Ulhannan
- K. P. A. C. Lalitha as Fr. Ulahannan's wife
- Shruthy Menon as Laura
- Pradeep Kottayam as Man in Cemetery
- Amby as Doctor

== Dubbing ==
Prakash Raj himself dubbed for the character Jossya Issac, while Shobi Thilakan dubbed for the former's role of Abraham. Manisha Koirala's role was dubbed by famous Malayalam actress Praveena. Nayanthara dubbed her own voice for her character Suchith Suresan gave voice to Skanda Ashok's character, Edwin.

== Production ==
=== Development ===
The film is based on the story of the Greek mythological character Electra. Set in the city of Argos a few years after the Trojan War, that story revolves around the vengeance that Electra and her brother Orestes take on their mother Clytemnestra and step father Aegisthus for the murder of their father, Agamemnon. There are many adaptations of the story. This film is particularly inspired by the plays Electra by Sophocles, Electra by Euripides, Oresteia by Aeschylus and Mourning Becomes Electra by Eugene O’Neill.

Shyamaprasad said that Electra is a play that has stayed with him since his student days in the Thrissur School of Drama. In a December 2010 interview, he said:

"It was a long cherished dream. I had this in my mind even when I was studying at the School of Drama. I was really very much influenced by the Greek drama, the strong female character, her love towards her father, her piousness, how she uses her brother to kill her stepfather, etc. I often felt that it has got the entire recipe for a good film. After Ritu, when I was thinking about my next film, this Greek drama resurfaced. Nayantara showed interest in working with me. That was when I thought adapting Electra for the silver screen would be a challenge worth taking.

Shyamaprasad was assisted in the script writing by Kiran Prabhakar. Rather than focusing on the essence of revenge in the myth, they tried to include the theme of Elektra's obsessive love for her father. Most of Shyamaprasad's previous works were adaptations of published novels or plays. About the adaptation of Elektra, Shyamaprasad said: "My film is a modern retelling of the Greek classic in a Malayali setting. But it closely follows the philosophy of the ancient text and the Grecian theory of drama that intense fear and pity lead to a purification of the emotions of the audience, making it a cathartic experience." The film, though adapted from a Greek myth, has a contemporary setting in an aristocratic family in Kerala. The making of the film was also inspired by K. G. George's magnum opus film, Irakal.

=== Casting ===
"My films are about very strong individuals who are caught in a vicious cycle of relationships. To portray those characters, I want actors who are capable of understanding that emotional intensity. I want actors who have proved themselves and are capable of diving into the depths of the characters. Not someone who is just beautiful. Elektra is minimalistic in its setting and cast. There are only five main characters and it is a frugal, no-frills mood that pervades the film."

— Shyamaprasad in an interview with The Hindu

Elektra is minimalistic in its setting and cast, with only five main characters. Nayantara plays Elektra, the lead character. She was cast after she expressed a desire to work with Shyamaprasad. While filming, Nayantara said, "I am doing this film purely for creative satisfaction, as it offers me an opportunity to showcase my histrionics skills. I am excited that I am going to explore a new genre and the director is insisting on spontaneity. So, I intend to go to the sets with an open mind." When asked the reason for entrusting such a strong role to Nayantara, Shyamaprasad said, "Everyone has this question. To be frank, after Ritu, I happened to meet Nayantara and she said she was really interested in doing movies with me. She was very keen on doing a meaningful role, something with substance. Usually she does those, you know, the glamorous, superficial roles which I guess supports her career. But she nursed the desire to do much deeper roles. Thus Elektra happened." Nayantara also gave voice to the character. Prakash Raj plays Elektra's father, and Bollywood actress Manisha Koirala plays her mother, who is also the main antagonist. The film is Koirala's debut in Malayalam cinema. About her casting, Shyamaprasad says: "At the initial stages of scripting itself, I had drawn a picture of the character in my mind and I wanted somebody very attractive yet very powerful to do the role. There was nobody I could think of other than Manisha. In terms of beauty, the inner quality of the character she identifies with and her experience in films, she was the perfect choice for me as Diana. When I approached her, she loved the script. She said she wanted to work with me and said would definitely be part of my dream project. I appreciate her move, as Malayalam as a language is really tough to learn and pronounce for an actor. But she pulled it off so gracefully. I have full admiration towards her and her work." Koirala says that she was advised by many not to do the film, as her character has an extramarital affair. Film actress Praveena dubbed for Koirala's character. Sakhi Thomas was the costume designer for this movie.

Kannada actor Skanda Ashok (Sooraj Skanda), who had a notable debut in Malayalam through Roshan Andrews's Notebook (2006), plays the role of Edwin, Elektra's brother, who is a neurotic, and according to him, "a sort of an underdog who goes on to save the day." Biju Menon, Srikumar and Sruthi Menon also play important roles in the film. There were reports that Tamil actor Arya was also cast in the movie.

=== Filming ===
Principal production for the film started on 23 April 2010. Major portions of filming were held at an old mansion, Kalapurackal House in Edakochi, Kerala. Cinematography was handled by Sanu George Varghese, making his debut in Malayalam. He made his feature film debut the same year with Karthik Calling Karthik.

== Release ==
The film premiered at the International Film Festival of India (IFFI) on 24 November 2010, where the lead performances were widely praised. It was the fifth Shyamaprasad film to be screened at the IFFI, and was one of the five Malayalam films selected to be screened that year. It was screened at the International Film Festival of Kerala on 14 December, where it also received overwhelmingly positive responses. However, the film provoked protests at both these festivals for its sensuous themes. Elektra made its international premiere at the 7th Dubai International Film Festival, where it was the only South Indian film to be selected. Elektra was the second Shyamaprasad film to be screened at this festival (the other being Ore Kadal) and the film received rave reviews there.

In September 2010, the Ernakulam Principal Munisif Court stayed the release and distribution of the film, following an allegation by the film's original distributor Martin Sebastin that the producer Vindhyan and his Rasika Entertainment were trying to release it on their own. The film was slated for a theatrical release on 3 December 2010, but the date was postponed many times. The film was finally released on 11 November 2016, after much delay.

== Accolades ==
Kerala State Film Awards

- 2011: Best Director: Shyamaprasad
- 2011: Best Dubbing Artist: Praveena

Official Selections

- International Film Festival of India, 2010
- International Film Festival of Kerala, 2010
- Dubai International Film Festival, 2010
- Gandhinagar International Film Festival, 2011
- Indian Film Festival 'Bollywood and Beyond', Stuttgart (Germany), 2011
- River to River Film Festival, Florence (Italy), 2011

== Soundtrack ==
Ouseppachan was signed to do music for the film, but was replaced by Alphons Joseph, who became well known in India for the song "Aaromale". The film is Joseph's first collaboration with Shyamaprasad. The lyrics were penned by Rafeeq Ahmed and Shelton Pinhiro. The soundtrack includes three songs.

No.	Title	Singer(s)	Length
1.	"Arikil Varu"	Gayatri	3:34
2.	"Ekakiyaayi"	Sayanora	4:28
3.	"Let's Dance"	Alphons Joseph	3:47
