= Sindhubaadh =

2019 Indian film by S. U. Arun Kumar

- Theatrical release poster
- Directed by: S. U. Arun Kumar
- Written by: S. U. Arun Kumar
- Produced by: S. N. Rajarajan; Shan Sutharsan
- Starring: Vijay Sethupathi; Anjali
- Cinematography: Vijay Kartik Kannan
- Edited by: Ruben
- Music by: Yuvan Shankar Raja
- Production companies: K Productions; Vansan Movies
- Distributed by: Clap Board Production
- Release date: 27 June 2019
- Running time: 133 minutes
- Country: India
- Language: Tamil

Sindhubaadh is a 2019 Indian Tamil-language action thriller film directed by S. U. Arun Kumar and produced by S. N. Rajarajan and Shan Sutharsan Vansan Movies and K Productions. The film stars Vijay Sethupathi and Anjali in the lead roles, while Linga, Vivek Prasanna and Surya Vijay Sethupathi appear in supporting roles. The music was composed by Yuvan Shankar Raja, while the cinematography was handled by Vijay Kartik Kannan and editing by Ruben.

== Plot ==
In a Cambodian underground clan, a Malaysian businessman pays to beat up a man begging for his daughter. Meanwhile, Venba, a loud-mouthed woman, works on a rubber plantation in Malaysia.

Thiru is a hard-of-hearing small-time theft who steals money and valuables from various people along with his sidekick, Super. They live in a house with Thiru's uncle. He says that he can only hear the necessary things. Thiru meets Venba and falls in love with her. Initially reluctant, Venba reciprocates his feelings after discovering his nature. Her family learns about Venba's and Thiru's affair, and her family berate her. Thiru beats up Venba's uncle as well. Venba goes to Malaysia for work, before Thiru marries her at the airport with a thali, and the passengers congratulate them. They snap a marriage selfie.

After a couple of weeks, Thiru receives a call from Venba, who reveals that she is in trouble. He gets ₹5 lakh (US$5,200) from the bank, using his house as collateral. Thiru reveals why he needed the money: Venba's uncle received a lump sum of money and sold Venba into a criminal organisation with other young girls without her knowledge. She called Thiru through Robert, her mediator. Venba requests Thiru to bring ₹5 lakh (US$5,200) and arrive in Thailand to save her. Thiru gets two passports for himself (under the name Hakim Sindhubaadh) and Super (under the name Milan Bharti).

On the way to Thailand, they meet a passenger who is going to the same place as them to see his daughter. Thiru gets into trouble with the Royal Malaysia Police. He reveals to the police officer, Ganesh, his thievery skills. Ganesh reveals to Thiru about a wealthy crime boss, Chang, and his ruthless brother, a gangster named Ling. He has to steal all the shields and medals from his house. At Ling's house, Chang and Ling catch Thiru and Super. Ling kills the other man after hanging him off a cliff, and tries to kill Thiru, but Super escapes, and Thiru spits in Ling's face and falls into the water.

Thiru asks the Thai people about Super's whereabouts; meanwhile, Ling's men are searching for them at the bus station. Ling arrives at the station, and they chase after Thiru. Thiru fights Ling's men. Robert angrily shouts at Venba that he can't find her husband, and she has to leave tomorrow. Venba eventually escapes from the captor's place. Ling chases Thiru and Super through an open rocky place, and they evade capture as Super throws rocks at Ling's men with a catapult. In Kanchanaburi, Venba reaches a boat; however, her captors find her and drag her back. In Surat Thani, Thiru and Super reach the 40th floor of a flat, and throw items at Ling's men. Thiru and Super arrive at the other building and manage to escape Ling once again. At Chang's house, he ties up Chang and calls Ling, and lets him know about his brother. They eventually steal the shields from Ling's house.

Ling arrives at his house and sees Chang tied up. His men trigger a gas explosion, killing Chang and supposedly killing Ling. Thiru and Super eventually travel by bus to Kanchanaburi, and they find out that Venba is not there, and is in Cambodia. They travel to Cambodia through the border. Thiru inquires with the local escorts about Venba, and he finds her friend, and tells him to go to Dan. Thiru meets Dan, beats up Dan's henchmen, and saves Ganesh. Ganesh reveals that Ling survived the explosion. He is furious and coming for Thiru. Ganesh reveals that Ling and Chang, apart from drug trafficking, are running an illegal skin trade, where they sell transplanted skin from young girls for a lucrative price. They target poor people and prostitutes, and Venba got unknowingly dragged into their criminal empire. They paid people to silence the news related to them, and killed them if they refused. Ling had many brokers, including Robert and Dan. Ganesh says he will deal with them.

They travel back to Thailand and give Robert ₹5 lakh (US$5,200). He finds the girls and kills Robert and his men as well. Ling and his men search for Thiru, Super and the girls, and they kill Ling's men one by one. Thiru eventually reunites with Venba. Thiru fights Ling, and after Ling cuts the girl's neck, the girls beat Ling up, killing him. In the end, the girl survived, and Thiru, Super and Venba live happily.

== Cast ==
- Vijay Sethupathi as Thiru (Hakim Sindhubadh)
- Anjali as Venba
- Linga as Ling
- Ashutosh Rana as Sharif
- Vivek Prasanna as Passenger
- Surya Sethupathi as Super (Milan Bharathi)
- Mukesh Rishi as Mayilvaganam
- Aruldoss as Support Raja
- Soundararaja as a politician
- George Maryan as Thiru's uncle
- Arav as Sathya
- Chang as a Malaysian don

== Production ==
The project was announced during March 2018, which revealed that S. U. Arun Kumar was all set to direct another venture that would star Vijay Sethupathi after Pannaiyarum Padminiyum (2014) and Sethupathi (2016). Principal photography for the untitled film commenced on 25 May 2018 at Tenkasi for 20 days and later continued at Thailand with a 32-day long schedule. Filming wrapped that December. The first-look poster for the film was unveiled on 16 January 2019, revealing the title as Sindhubaadh.

== Soundtrack ==
The soundtrack was composed by Yuvan Shankar Raja, while the music rights were bought by Muzik 247.

Track listing
No.	Title	Lyrics	Singer(s)	Length
1.	"Rockstar Robber"	Rahul Raj (Rap Machines), Pav Bundy	Pav Bundy, ADK (Rap Machines)	3:03
2.	"Nenja Unakkaga"	Vivek	Haricharan	3: 29
3.	"Unnalathan"	Pa. Vijay	Al-Rufiyan, Priya Mali	3: 19
4.	"Neeyum Naanum"	Karthik Netha	Santhosh	3:59
Total length:				13:50

== Release and reception ==
The film was released on 27 June 2019, and received mixed reviews. M. Sugandh of The Times of India gave 3/5 stars and wrote "Sindhubaadh isn't as satisfying as Arun Kumar's previous films, but it isn't entirely a letdown either." India Today gave 2.5/5 stars and wrote "Director SU Arun Kumar's [Sindhubaadh] could have been a satisfying thriller, but he puts in too many ideas in the film. If only Arun Kumar had done away with a few sub-plots and plugged the logical loopholes, Sindhubaadh would have been a better watch."

Karthik Kumar of Hindustan Times gave 2/5 stars and wrote "Director Arun Kumar, who really impressed with his previous films Pannaiyarum Padminiyum and Sethupathi, struggles to give us a film that's neither wholesomely action-packed nor funny enough to oversee its shortcomings. If not for the lead characters and their performances, Sindhubaadh would've been unimaginably boring." Pradeep Kumar of The Hindu wrote, "Sindhubaadh is a one time watch for if you want to catch a normal Vijay Sethupathi, fresh off of his Super Deluxe exploits, on the screen. But it is not a film that will go into your best of Sethupathi collection."
