= Positive (2008 film) =

- Directed by: V. K. Prakash
- Written by: S. N. Swamy
- Produced by: Fabulance Entertainment Pvt Ltd.
- Starring: Jayasurya; Skanda Ashok; Vani Kishore; Saikumar; Ananya
- Cinematography: Ganesh Rajavelu
- Music by: Alex Paul
- Release date: 16 May 2008
- Country: India
- Language: Malayalam

Positive is a 2008 Indian Malayalam-language crime thriller film directed by V. K. Prakash, starring Jayasurya, Skanda Ashok, Vani Kishore, Saikumar, and Ananya. The film was dubbed into Telugu as Suspense in 2016.

== Plot ==
Close friends Raju, Vini, Udayan, and Jerry form a music troupe. Raju is having an affair with a young girl named Jyothi. One day, Jyothi leaves the hostel without saying anything to Raju.

Jyothi was forced by her brother, Mahesh, and his wife to marry Das. Jyothi and Das got married and were shifted to a flat where she got a nearby friend, Vini. Vini's parents try to get her married off to a police officer named Aniyan. Even though this marriage doesn't take place, something drastic happens. After three months of marriage, Das was found dead. They now have to face ACP Aniyan, who confronts them as a police officer. Aniyan questions Jyothi in her flat when he notices a hair strand on a towel. He takes that with him and sends it for a forensic test. He learns that the hair thread was that of Rose, a servant of Das and also a relative of Joseph, the security manager of the building.

While being questioned, Rose cooks up another story that Das was attempting to rape her. Later, the truth comes out that Das had kept a box full of counterfeit money in his flat which was found by her. She called Joseph, and they both decided to take that money with them (without knowing that it was fake). Meanwhile, Das comes to the flat and finds that Rose is sweating and he asks the reason. She says nothing, and later, he finds his money lost and asks her about the same. By that time, Joseph kills Das by hitting his head, and they both together hang him on the fan. The two are sent to jail.

== Cast ==
- Jayasurya as A.C.P Aniyan
- Skanda Ashok as Raju
- Vani Kishore as Vini
- Manikuttan as Udayan
- Ramesh Pisharody as Jerry
- Shari as Sujatha
- Saikumar as Bhaskar, the City Police Commissioner
- Jagathy Sreekumar as Uthaman
- Ananya as Jyothi
- T. G. Ravi as Constable Ravi
- Augustine as Joseph
- Vimal Raj as Pappan
- Bindu Panicker as Usha
- Sudheer Sukumaran as Das
- Boban Alummoodan as Mahesh
- Maya Viswanath
- Bindu Ramakrishnan
- Deepika Mohan
- Ambika Mohan
- Alsabith

== Soundtrack ==
The film's soundtrack contains 4 songs, all composed by Alex Paul and Lyrics by Sarath Vayalar.

#	Title	Singer(s)
1	"Enthininnu Mizhineer"	Franco, Ramesh, Anoop Sankar, Balu
2	"Kanda Naal Muthal"	P. Jayachandran
3	"Orikkal Neeparanju"	G. Venugopal, Manjari
4	"Oru Kaattaay Paari Nadakkaam"	Franco, Ramesh, Anoop Sankar, Balu
