= Chaarulatha =

2012 film directed by Pon Kumaran

- Theatrical release poster in Kannada
- Directed by: Pon Kumaran
- Screenplay by: Pon Kumaran
- Based on: Alone by Banjong Pisanthanakun and Parkpoom Wongpoom
- Produced by: Dwarakish; Ramesh Krishnamoorthy
- Starring: Priyamani; Skanda Ashok
- Cinematography: M. V. Panneerselvam
- Edited by: Don Max
- Music by: Sundar C Babu
- Production companies: Global One Studios; Dwarakish Chithra
- Distributed by: Sax Pictures
- Release date: 20 September 2012
- Country: India
- Languages: Kannada; Tamil

Chaarulatha (also spelled as Charulatha) is a 2012 Indian horror film made in Kannada and Tamil. The film was directed by Pon Kumaran, a former associate to K. Bhagyaraj and K. S. Ravikumar, and features Priyamani in a dual role and Skanda Ashok in a male lead with Saranya Ponvannan in a supporting role. It is a remake of the 2007 Thai horror film Alone. Sundar C Babu composed the film's music. The film’s story is about conjoined twins. Produced by Global One Studios and distributed by Hansraj Saxena's Sax Pictures.

Charulatha released on 21 September 2012 with dubbed Malayalam and Telugu versions with the same title.

== Plot ==
The story begins by introducing the conjoined twins Charu and Latha. They live in Vizag as one body and soul until Ravi enters their lives. Both sisters fall in love with him, but Ravi falls for Charu, causing a rift between her and Latha.

Eventually, their mother plans to separate their conjoined bodies through surgery. However, the surgery tragically results in Latha’s accidental death. Mysterious events unfold as Latha begins to haunt Charu. As the story progresses, Charu sees her deceased twin playing the violin they once shared, only for the apparition to vanish when Ravi touches Charu.

Later, at the hospital, Ravi visits the twins' mother, who tries to tell him something but struggles to do so. As tensions ease, Ravi returns to the twins' mother, who finally reveals a secret at the graveyard. Ravi discovers that it was actually Charu who died, and Latha has been impersonating her.

Flashbacks reveal that after Ravi confessed his love to Charu before leaving town, Latha, enraged, refused to join Charu on the balcony to bid farewell. Later, in a fit of anger, Latha tore up a picture of Charu given by Ravi, worsening their relationship. This culminated in a tragic confrontation on the stairs, resulting in Charu's death and the subsequent separation of the twins.

In a final confrontation, Latha, driven by love and rage, confesses her feelings to Ravi and faces Charu's spirit, which sets their house ablaze. Latha refuses to leave until Ravi reciprocates her feelings. Upon her mother's pleas, Ravi sacrifices his love for Charu to save Latha and they get out of the house to safety.

The film concludes with Ravi and Latha placing flowers on Charu's grave, where Ravi feels Charu's spirit smiling upon him as Latha approaches, suggesting her acceptance of their union.

== Cast ==
- Priyamani in a dual role as Chaaru and Latha
  - Baby Gagana and Baby Chandhana as the young Charu and Latha
- Skanda Ashok as Ravi
- Saranya Ponvannan as Chaaru and Latha's mother
- Seetha as Ravi's aunt
- Sunetra Pandith (Kannada) / Aarthi (Tamil) as Manja/Manga's sister
- R. N. Sudarshan as a violin class teacher
- P. Ravi Shankar as Priest
- Shille Manjunath as Manja/Manga

== Production ==
Chaarulatha is Priyamani's first dual role film. She denied that the film was based on the American film Stuck on You, asserting that it had an "original storyline".

== Music ==
The audio launch function of Charulatha was held at Sathyam Cinemas, Chennai. Hansraj Saxena, Dhananjayan Govind, Priyamani, Saranya Ponvannan, composer Vijay Antony, lyricist Madhan Karky alongside directors K. Bhagyaraj, K. S. Ravikumar and R. Kannan graced the event. Ravikumar released the audio and Bhagyaraj received it.

Kannada track listing
No.	Title	Lyrics	Singer(s)	Length
1.	"Ondhu Maneyaa"	V. Nagendra Prasad	Ganga, Varsha Ranjith, K. G. Ranjith	2:53
2.	"Ivan Yaaro"	V. Nagendra Prasad	Suchith Suresan, Sharmila	3:38
3.	"Oh Kandhaa"	V. Nagendra Prasad	Mahathi	5:04
4.	"Jai Kaali Maa"	V. Nagendra Prasad	Reshma, Senthil Dass	2:20
5.	"Welcome"		Suchith Suresan, Rita	3:57
6.	"Violin Theme (Instrumental)"	—	—	1:38
7.	"First Love (Instrumental)"	—	—	2:36
Total length:				22:06

Tamil track listing
No.	Title	Lyrics	Singer(s)	Length
1.	"Kadavul Thandha"	Pon Kumaran	K. G. Ranjith, Ganga, Varsha Ranjith
2.	"Idai Illa"	Madhan Karky	Suchith Suresan, Sharmila
3.	"Ondraagha"	Madhan Karky	Mahathi
4.	"Jai Kaali Maa"	Madhan Karky	Senthil Dass, Reshma
5.	"Aanjay"		Suchith Suresan, Rita
6.	"Violin Theme (Instrumental)"	—	—
7.	"First Love (Instrumental)"	—	—

== Release ==
The film was released in Kannada and Tamil version. The film was also dubbed in Malayalam and Telugu languages. While the Malayalam version was dubbed from Kannada, the Telugu version was dubbed from the Tamil print. While the Kannada version received a U/A certificate from the censor board, the Tamil version received a U certificate. The film was released on 21 September 2012.

=== Reception ===
A critic from The Times of India scored the film at 3.5 out of 5 stars and says "Priyamani for her amazing performance as Chaaru and Latha. Skanda shines as a loverboy and artist with excellent dialogue delivery, body language and expressions. Ravishankar shines as a tantric practitioner. Music by Sundar B Babu is good. Cinematography by Paneer Selvam is pleasing to the eyes". A critic from The Hindu wrote "Songs or RR, Sundar C. Babu’s music for Charulatha isn’t appealing. But the significant solo violin bits are an exception. For those who wish to watch the spirits of the dead that don’t frighten you much!" B S Srivani from Deccan Herald wrote "Kumar’s screenplay manages to create some drama, heightened by Sundar C Babu. But the sense of déjà vu refuses to go away. The whole ‘lore’ surrounding conjoined twins is left alone, except in a single mention. The viewer has to look for inspiration to get spooked. But then Chaarulatha has enough to rekindle some of that intrigue". A critic from The New Indian Express wrote "Nothing great about Harsha's choreography and Mohan B Kere's art. The Verdict : Though the film cannot be labelled a total horror flick, go watch it for Priyamani's stellar performance". Srikanth Srinivasa from Rediff.com scored the film at 3 out of 5 stars and says "Debutant Skanda is a good find. Sharanya as the mother has a limited role, which could have been expanded given the importance of the subject. Panneer Selvam's cinematography is good. Chaarulatha is a brilliant film that could have been more emotionally appealing, but watch it for Priya Mani". A critic from Sify.com wrote "The saving grace of the film is Priyamani’s twin role as otherwise the script and presentation is shoddy. There is more comedy elements thrust into the film than the essentials of a horror film".

== Accolades ==
Ceremony	Category	Nominee	Result
2nd South Indian International Movie Awards	Best Actress	Priyamani	Won
