= 7:11 PM =

- Theatrical release poster
- Directed by: Chaitu Madala
- Written by: Chaitu Madala; Hemant K Bhatnagar
- Produced by: Naren Yanamadala; Madhuri Ravipati; Vani Kanneganti
- Starring: Saahas Pagadala; Deepika Reddy; Tess Walsh; Raghu Karumanchi; Bharath Reddy; Rising Raju
- Cinematography: Siva Shankar; Fabio Capodivento; Chaitu Madala
- Edited by: Srinu Thota
- Music by: Gyaani
- Production company: Arcus Films
- Distributed by: Mythri Movie Makers
- Release date: 7 July 2023
- Country: India
- Language: Telugu

7:11 PM is a 2023 Indian Telugu-language sci-fi action thriller film directed by Chaitu Madala and produced by Naren Yanamadala, Madhuri Ravipati and Vani Kanneganti under the banner Arcus Films.The film was released on 7 July 2023 in India, Australia and USA.

== Plot ==
Future humans from a distant planet arrive in a small Indian town named Hamsaladeevi on a fateful day in 1999 in search of answers that will determine the survival of human species in the future. On the same day, things are already moving rapidly to wipe the town off the face of earth. At 7:11 PM, these events come together to create a suspenseful thriller that will have audience guessing and on the edge of their seats.

== Cast ==
- Saahas Pagadala as Ravi
- Deepika Reddy as Vimala
- Tess Walsh as Sarah
- Raghu Karumanchi as Ganda
- Bharath Reddy as Krishna
- Charan Kurugonda as Einstein
- Surabhi Prabhavathi as Pinni
- Mathew Da Via as Ein
- Sienna Lillie Ham as Sienna
- Clay Antonio as Titus
- Louie Athanasiou as Peter
- Hemant k Bhatnagar as Babar
- Marina Bi as Arra
- Anil Vemuri as Veera
- Rajesh Pilla as Aparimitham Rajesh
- Vasu Routhu as Ramu

== Production ==
The film was produced by Naren Yanamadala, Madhuri Ravipati and Vani Kanneganti under the banner of Arcus Films. Pre-production began in 2019. The writers Chaitu Madala and Hemant K Bhatnagar took 1.5 years to complete the script. Principal photography started in March 2020 and was immediately stalled after 10 days due to COVID-19 outbreak. The film shoot has resumed in July 2020 and was shot amongst strict COVID-19 lockdowns in India. The Australian shoot has started in December 2020 between lockdowns and has completed in July 2021 due to sporadic lockdowns in Victoria where majority of the shoot was done. VFX work was done by Ohm Ramesh who worked on Ghazi Attack in the past.

== Reception ==
7:11 PM has opened to mixed reviews.

A critic from The Hans India gave the film 2.75 out of 5 rating and has called the film technically high with VFX being exceptionally great with all the space shots and other interesting scenes. Sakshi gave the film 2.5 out of 5 stars. Kiran Kumar Thanjavur of News18 Telugu gave it 2.5 out of 5 stars and stated, "An impressive time travel drama here and there."
