= Malli Malli =

2009 Indian Telugu-language film

- Directed by: Raaj Adithya
- Written by: Raaj Adithya
- Produced by: Dinesh Kumar
- Starring: Skanda Ashok; Kalyani
- Cinematography: Dasaradhi Sivendra
- Edited by: Marthand K. Venkatesh
- Music by: S. Thaman
- Production company: Sree Sahasya Entertainment Pvt Ltd
- Release date: 21 March 2009
- Running time: 120 minutes
- Country: India
- Language: Telugu

Malli Malli (transl. Again, again) is a 2009 Indian Telugu-language action-drama film directed by Raaj Adithya and starring Skanda Ashok and Kalyani in their Telugu debuts. The film is inspired by the Hollywood film If Only (2004). The film also marked the compositional debut for S. Thaman.

== Plot ==
All of the events in the story take place in a day. Nandu (Skanda) is an unemployed graduate who is suffering because he was unsuccessful in getting a job and is about to attempt suicide. A man convinces him that he will give Nandu money if he kills Satya (Sachin Khedekar). Nandu later wakes up and realizes that all of this was a dream. Although it was a dream, whatever he dreamt so far happened in real life. He uses what he learned from his dream to fall in love with his girlfriend, Madhu (Kalyanee), and save Satya from the killer.

== Cast ==
- Skanda as Nandu
- Kalyani as Madhumathi Satyanarayana
- Sachin Khedekar as Satya
- Venu Madhav
- Brahmanandam
- Krishna Bhagavaan
- Ravi Prakash
- Fish Venkat
- Melkote
- Apoorva
- Dr. Bharath
- Master Bharath

== Production ==
Raaj Aditya, who previously directed Pourudu (2008), directed this film. Rahul Ravindran, who starred in the delayed Tamil film Moscowin Kavery (2010) was approached to play the lead role, but he was unable to sign the film as he was busy shooting other films. Aditya came across the songs from the Malayalam film, Notebook (2006) and signed Skanda Ashok for the lead role. Bollywood actor Sachin Khedekar was signed to portray a non-resident Indian. Kalyani, who starred with Mammooty in Parunthu (2008), was signed as the heroine. The film was shot in 42 days. The film will mark the Telugu debut of Kalyani after the release of her first film, Manchu Kurise Velalo, was delayed.

== Soundtrack ==
The film was composed by S. Thaman. Lyrics were written by Ananta Sriram and Ramajogayya Sastry. The music was launched by Daggubati Suresh Babu and the audio release function took place at Hotel Mariotte in Hyderabad on 7 December 2008. Amit Tiwari, Geeta Singh, Poonam Kaur, Krishnudu and director Saikiran were present at the audio launch.

| Song title | Singer(s) |
|---|---|
| "Nuvvena" | Rahul Nambiar |
| "Maggada" | K. S. Chithra |
| "Ninnatene" | Ranjith, Naveen |
| "Magic Magic" | Karthik, Shweta Mohan |
| "Sodari Janmaki" | Ranjith |

== Reception ==
Jeevi of Idlebrain.com gave the film two out of five stars and wrote that "Ironically, the director who wanted to discourage the depressed youth from attempting suicide finally succumbed to death by committing it on the release day of this film. On a whole, Malli Malli disappoints".
