= S. U. Arun Kumar =

Indian film director and screenwriter

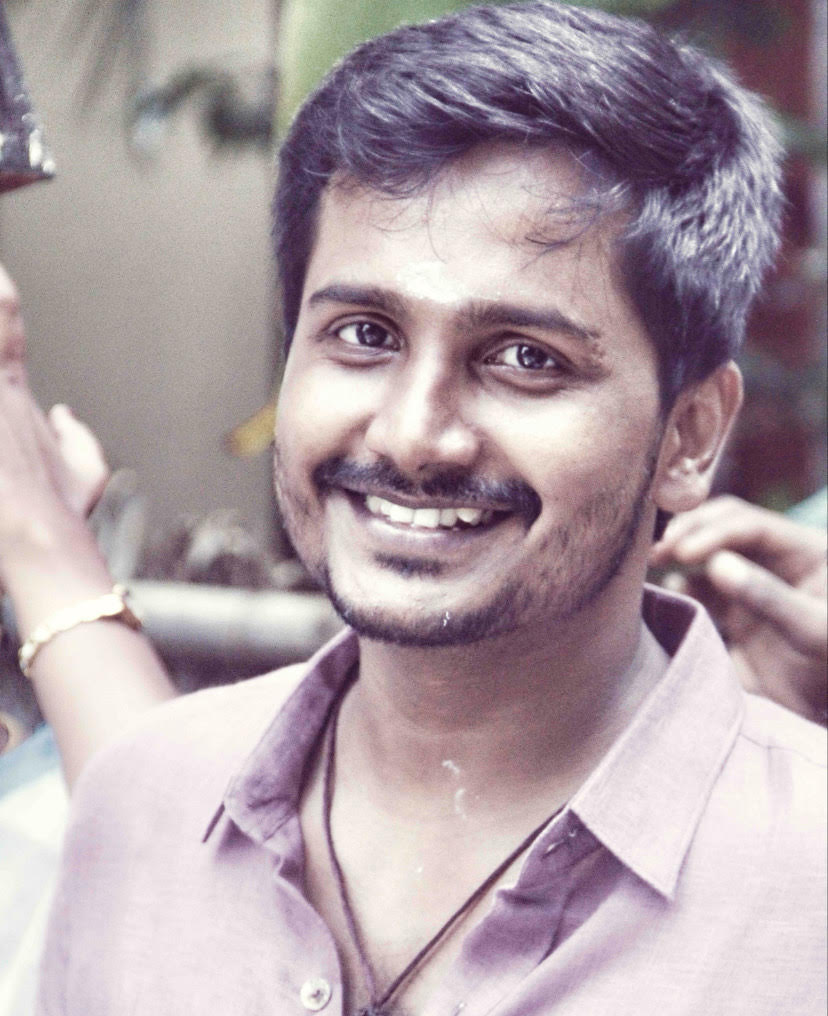
- Born: 26 February 1987 (age 39); Madurai, Tamil Nadu, India
- Occupations: Film director Screenwriter
- Years active: 2014–present

S. U. Arun Kumar is an Indian film director and screenwriter who works in the Tamil film industry. He is from Paravai near Madurai, Tamil Nadu. He is known for directing the films Pannaiyarum Padminiyum (2014), Sethupathi (2016), and Chithha (2023).

== Personal life ==
Arun Kumar married costume designer Deepika in November 2016. The wedding took place in his hometown, Paravai. In addition to their long-standing professional friendship, Arun Kumar shares a personal bond with Vijay Sethupathi and his family, but it seems they have separated. Kumar's second marriage was held in Madurai on 2 February 2025.

== Career ==
Kumar became interested in filmmaking and made a few short films. He joined the second season of Nalaya Iyakunar (a TV competition for short films) to build his portfolio.

Kumar made his feature film directorial debut with Pannaiyarum Padminiyum (2014) starring Vijay Sethupathi. The film was originally a short film and later made into a feature film, retaining the main characters but with a completely different storyline. Though it won critical acclaim and was screened at many international film festivals, it was not successful at the box office.

Kumar later collaborated with Vijay Sethupathi again for Sethupathi (2016) as they both wanted to give a commercial hit together. It released to positive reviews and ended up being a commercial success. Arun Kumar joined hands with Vijay Sethupathi for the third time for Sindhubaadh (2019). The actor was cast in the film after eleven other actors could not work in the film due to various reasons. Kumar cast Vijay Sethupathi's son, Surya, in Sindhubaadh although Sethupathi was insistent to cast someone else. Most of the film's footage was shot in Malaysia, Cambodia and Thailand.

Kumar made a documentary called Imaikka Vizhigal in 2020 about the chain snatching epidemic in Tenkasi. In addition to being its writer and director, he was also the cinematographer.

Kumar then directed Chithha (2023) starring Siddharth in the lead. It released in late 2023 and received critical acclaim.

His next project was Veera Dheera Sooran starring Vikram, which was released in early 2025.

== Filmography ==
Key
†	Denotes films that have not yet been released

=== Feature films ===
Year	Film	Notes	Ref.
2014	Pannaiyarum Padminiyum	Tamil Nadu State Film Award for Best Film (Third prize); Bengaluru International Film Festival (Special Jury Award)	
2016	Sethupathi		
2019	Sindhubaadh		
2023	Chithha	Filmfare Award for Best Director - Tamil	
2025	Veera Dheera Sooran: Part – 2		
2027	Sandiyar †	Filming	

=== Short films ===
Year	Title
2012	Pannaiyarum Padminiyum
2012	5 Rupees
2012	Nadodi Mannan
