= Shweta Bhardwaj =

Indian actress and model

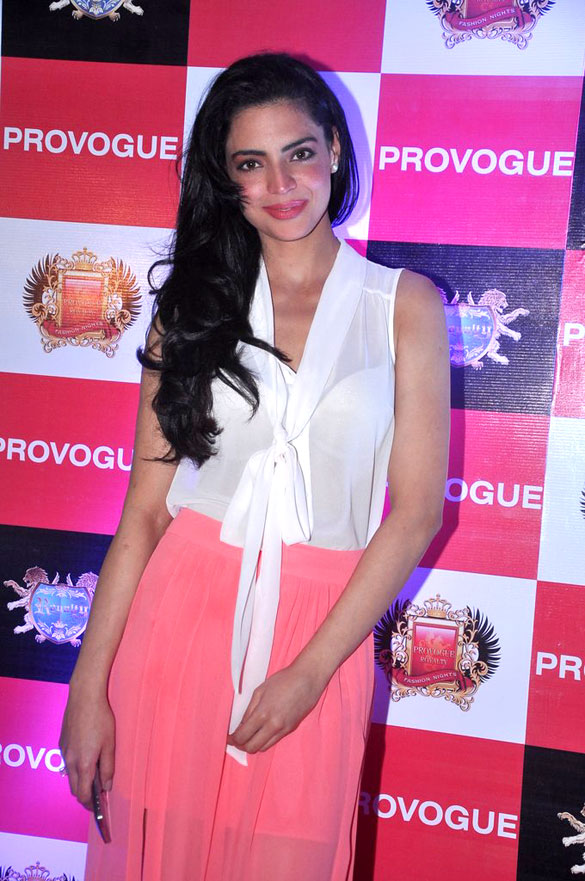
- Born: Delhi, India
- Occupations: Actress, model
- Years active: 2008–2013

Shweta Bhardwaj is an Indian actress and model who has acted in Hindi and Telugu language films. She made her acting debut in the 2008 action Hindi film Mission Istanbul, starring Vivek Oberoi & Zayed Khan. She has been a Gladrags Model.

== Background ==
Born and brought up in Delhi, Shweta studied at Gargi College, and has an Honors degree in History. She made her debut as Lisa Lobo in the 2008 Apoorva Lakhia film Mission Istaanbul.

== Filmography ==
Year	Film	Role	Language	Notes
2008	Mission Istanbul	Lisa Lobo	Hindi	
2009	Indumathi	Honey	Telugu	
2011	Bin Bulaye Baraati	Item girl	Hindi	
2011	Loot	Tanya	Hindi	
2012	Players	Shaila	Hindi	Guest Appearance
2012	Businessman		Telugu	Item Song - We love Bad boys
2012	Chaalis Chauraasi		Hindi	
2013	Raqt - Ek Rishta		Hindi	
2013	Adda		Telugu	Item song
