= Ravi Prakash =

Indian actor

- Born: 4 December 1978 (age 47); Vijayawada, Andhra Pradesh, India
- Occupation: Actor
- Years active: 2000–present

Ravi Prakash (born 4 December 1978) is an Indian actor who primarily appears in Telugu and Tamil films.

== Career ==
Ravi was born in Vijayawada and grew up in Visakhapatnam, India. After completing his secondary education, he chose to pursue a career in medicine and studied for his MBBS degree in Russia. During his university holidays, Ravi returned to Visakhapatnam and often took part in modelling, while also attending the Satyanand Acting Institute alongside his friends. He was spotted by the film studio, Ushakiran Movies, who offered him the chance to play the leading role in their production, Subhavela (2000). Credited in the film as Ravikanth, his first film opened to mixed reviews and went unnoticed at the box office, with a critic noting the "newcomers fail to impress". The failure of the film prompted him to finish his degree and then train as a house surgeon, before he decided to concentrate on a career in the film industry. After his break, he was first offered the chance to portray a small role in Eeswar (2002), before developing a niche in portraying bigger supporting roles in films. Notably, he portrayed a police officer in Gautham Vasudev Menon's Gharshana (2004) and Trivikram Srinivas's Athadu (2005).

In the early 2010s, he featured in more Tamil films and notably appeared as a pilot in the heist drama Payanam (2011), as a police officer in the anthology film Vaanam (2011), a villain in K. V. Anand's action drama Maattrraan (2012) and as the lead actor's supportive brother in Gautham Menon Neethane En Ponvasantham (2012).

== Filmography ==
=== Telugu ===
Year	Title	Role	Notes
2000	Subhavela	Surya	
2002	Eeswar		
2003	Seetayya	Srinivas Naidu	
2003	Okariki Okaru	Shahrukh	
2004	Gharshana	Police Officer	
2005	Modati Cinema		
2005	123 from Amalapuram		
2005	Athadu	Ravi	
2005	Seenugadu Chiranjeevi Fan	Kumar	
2005	Anukokunda Oka Roju	Mahesh	
2006	Shock	Sekhar's friend	
2006	Party	Mr. Berde	
2006	Maayajaalam	Vamsi's brother	
2006	Oka V Chitram	Supraja's husband	
2006	Stalin	Software Engineer	
2007	Chandrahas	Sohail	
2007	Athidhi	Ravi	
2008	Aatadista	Jagan's elder brother	
2008	John Apparao 40 Plus		
2008	Baladoor	Groom	
2008	Chintakayala Ravi	Karthik	
2009	Indumathi	Investigating officer	
2009	Fitting Master	Ashok	
2009	Malli Malli		
2009	Naa Style Veru		
2009	Ganesh Just Ganesh	Prakash	
2010	Vedam	Shivaram	
2010	Simha	Anand Prasad	
2010	Vykuntapali	Murthy	
2010	Panchakshari		
2010	Manasara...	young Kutti	
2011	Vykuntapali	Murthy	
2011	Gaganam	Flight Captain Girish	
2011	Seema Tapakai	Manoj	
2011	Daggaraga Dooranga	Hari	
2011	Dookudu	Ravi Prakash IPS	
2011	Solo	Ravi	
2012	Rushi	Venkat	credited as Ravi
2012	Ishq	Prabhu	
2012	Julai	Dhanushkoti	
2012	Dhenikaina Ready	Narasimha Naidu's brother	
2012	Krishnam Vande Jagadgurum	Pattabhi	
2012	Yeto Vellipoyindhi Manasu	Harish	
2012	Golconda High School	Sundar	
2012	Sarocharu	Ravi	
2013	Baadshah	Radha Krishna Simha	
2013	Attarintiki Daredi	Siddhappa Naidu's son	
2013	Iddarammayilatho		
2013	Doosukeltha	Ravi Chandar	
2014	Love You Bangaram	Police officer	
2014	Prathinidhi	ACP	
2014	Rabhasa	Obul Reddy's brother	
2014	Aagadu	Bharath's brother-in-law	
2014	Rough	Chandu's brother-in-law	
2014	Govindudu Andarivadele	Baachi's brother	
2015	S/O Satyamurthy	Kumaraswamy Naidu	
2015	Dagudumootha Dandakor	Hari	
2015	Lion	Ravindra	
2015	Where Is Vidya Balan	Doctor	
2015	Dynamite	C.I.	
2015	Rudhramadevi		
2015	Srimanthudu	Dr. Ganesh	
2015	Bruce Lee: The Fighter	Ravi	
2015	Kanche	Janardhan Sashtri	
2016	Dictator	Inspector Rasool	
2016	Srirastu Subhamastu	Siva	
2016	Janatha Garage	Police Officer Dinesh Kumar	
2016	Nirmala Convent	Bhupati Raja's younger brother	
2017	Shatamanam Bhavati	Raju's friend	
2017	Gautamiputra Satakarni	Gandaraya	
2017	Katamarayudu	Ravi	
2017	Keshava	C.I. Ravi	
2017	Mister	Ravi Prakash	
2017	Babu Baga Busy	Uttej	
2017	Jayadev	Srihari	
2017	Kadhile Bommala Katha		
2017	Meda Meeda Abbayi		
2017	Raja The Great	Police Officer	
2018	Jai Simha	Shaam	
2018	Rangula Ratnam	Keerthi's father	
2018	Anthaku Minchi		
2018	Ammammagarillu	Santhosh's uncle	
2018	Shambho Shankara		
2018	Neevevaro	Blind singer	
2018	Goodachari	Vijay	
2018	Geetha Govindam	Police Officer Ravi	
2018	U Turn	Prabhakar	
2018	Aravinda Sametha Veera Raghava	Oosanna	
2018	Veera Bhoga Vasantha Rayalu	Dr. Surya	
2018	Taxiwaala	Shiva's brother	
2018	Amar Akbar Anthony	Chidambaram	
2019	N.T.R: Kathanayakudu	D. Yoganand	
2019	Majili	Coach Srinu	
2019	Maharshi	Police Officer	
2019	Rakshasudu	Police Officer Sravan	
2019	Kousalya Krishnamurthy	PT Teacher	
2019	Marshal	Abhi's brother-in-law	
2019	Raagala 24 Gantallo	Police Inspector	
2019	Hulchul		
2020	Valayam	Police Inspector Raghuram	
2021	Lakshya		
2021	Gamanam	Police Officer Raghuram	
2022	Son of India		
2022	Acharya	Sivudu	
2022	Sarkaru Vaari Paata	Assistant Manager Krishna Murthy	
2022	Itlu Maredumilli Prajaneekam	Police SP	
2022	Raajahyogam	Car owner	
2023	Amigos	NIA Officer Ravi	
2023	Custody	SI Rangappa	
2024	The Family Star	Govardhan's brother	
2024	Buddy		
2024	Jithender Reddy	Gunman Gattaiah	
2024	Laggam	Ravi	
2025	Coffee with a Killer	Jagadeesh	
2025	Jack	Manoj’s assistant	
2025	Hari Hara Veera Mallu		
2025	Thank You Dear		
2025	Trimukha	CI Satya	
2025	Akhanda 2: Thaandavam	Vishal Trivedi	
2025	Premante	Asha Mary’s husband	
2026	Euphoria		

=== Tamil ===
Year	Title	Role	Notes
2008	Kamasutra Nights	Aunt Maya's father	
2009	Kadhalna Summa Illai	Police officer	
2009	Vettaikaaran	Police Commissioner of Chennai	
2011	Payanam	Flight Captain Girish	
2011	Vaanam	Shivaram	
2012	Maattrraan	Dinesh	
2012	Neethane En Ponvasantham	Harish	
2013	Ethir Neechal	Coach Raja Singh	
2013	Thalaivaa	Kesav	
2014	Vallavanukku Pullum Aayudham	Dharma	
2014	Megha	Srinivasan	
2016	Pencil	School Chairman	
2017	Mupparimanam	Anusha's uncle	
2017	Veruli		
2018	U Turn	Prabhakar	
2019	Viswasam	Gautham Veer's personal assistant	
2019	Kaappaan	Mahadev's assistant	
2022	Cadaver	Doctor Salim Rahman	
2023	Custody	SI Rangappa	
2025	Thiral		

=== Other languages ===
Year	Title	Role	Language
2014	RajadhiRaja	Devilal Patel IPS	Malayalam
2015	Gabbar is Back	Ravi	Hindi
2018	Seizer	Police Officer Ravi	Kannada
2019	Manikarnika: The Queen of Jhansi	Scindia King of Gwalior	Hindi
2026	Dashami	Inspector Asif Mujavar	Marathi

=== Television ===
Year	Title	Role	Network	Notes
2020	Chadarangam	Bapineedu	ZEE5	
2021	Kudi Yedamaithe	Mahendra	Aha	
2022	9 Hours	Shivaji	Disney+ Hotstar	
2025	Kobali	Srinu	Disney+ Hotstar	
2025	Mayasabha	Valluri Chalapathi Rao	SonyLIV	
