= Tanya Ravichandran =

Indian actress (born 1996)

- Born: Abbirami Sriram; Chennai, Tamil Nadu, India
- Occupation: Actress
- Years active: 2016–present
- Mother: Lavanya Sriram
- Relatives: Ravichandran (maternal grandfather)

Tanya Ravichandran (born Abbirami Sriram) is an Indian actress who has predominantly worked in Tamil-language films. She had roles in Nenjukku Needhi (2022), Balle Vellaiyathevaa (2016), Brindavanam (2017) and Karuppan (2017).

== Career ==
The granddaughter of Malaysian Tamil actor Ravichandran, Tanya was interested in a career in films from a young age after seeing her grandfather's work. Her mother, Lavanya Sriram, is a classical dancer and trained both Tanya and her sister Apparajitha in Bharathanatyam, with the pair regularly participating in recitals in Chennai during their teenage years. Before her entry into the film industry, she completed a Bachelor of Commerce degree at M.O.P. Vaishnav College for Women in Chennai and pursued a master's degree at Madras School of Social Work. Tanya first successfully auditioned for a film to be directed by Mysskin in early 2016 and was cast opposite fellow debutant actor Maitreya in the lead role. Mysskin requested her to change her stage name from Abbirami to Tanya for her acting career, which she agreed with. The film was later postponed to allow Mysskin to complete the production of Thupparivaalan (2017). Hearing that Tanya had been selected for a film by Mysskin, director Radha Mohan chose to screen test and then sign on the actress to appear in Brindavanam (2017) during August 2016. Tanya's first release was however Balle Vellaiyathevaa (2016), a rural comedy drama co-starring Sasikumar, which she was offered after the makers saw the promotional stills of Brindavanam. The film opened to mixed reviews in December 2016, with critics noting that Tanya "has nothing to do" and "sleepwalks through the role".

Her next film, the comedy drama Brindavanam was released to positive reviews in May 2017. Set in Ooty, the film narrates the story of a deaf and dumb boy played by Arulnithi and his relationship with the film actor Vivek. Praising her performance, a critic from The Hindu wrote Tanya "walks away with a wonderful performance in the role of Sandhya" and that "the director deserves appreciation for his sketch of the lead female character; someone who is bold, daring and can make individual choices". Likewise, a reviewer from The Hindustan Times wrote Tanya "is a talent to watch out for and she's in this for the long haul" and a critic from The New Indian Express labelled her performance as "thoroughly effervescent". Tanya then featured in Karuppan (2017), a rural drama featuring her alongside Vijay Sethupathi and Bobby Simha.

== Personal life ==
In July 2025, Tanya announced her engagement to Goutham George, a cinematographer.

== Filmography ==
=== Films ===
- All films are in Tamil language unless otherwise noted.

| Year | Title | Role | Notes | Ref |
|---|---|---|---|---|
| 2016 | Balle Vellaiyathevaa | Thanikodi | Debut film | |
| 2017 | Brindavanam | Sandhya | | |
| 2017 | Karuppan | Anbuselvi | | |
| 2021 | Raja Vikramarka | Kanthi | Telugu film | |
| 2022 | Nenjuku Needhi | Adhithi Vijayaraghvan | | |
| 2022 | Maayon | Anjana | | |
| 2022 | Trigger | Janani | | |
| 2022 | Godfather | Jhanvi | Telugu film | |
| 2023 | Agilan | Punitha | | |
| 2024 | Rasavathi | Surya | | |
| 2025 | Rambo | Malar | | |
| 2025 | BP 180 | Dr. Thangam | | |
| 2025 | Retta Thala | Vaijayanti | | |

=== Television ===
| Year | Title | Role | Language | Network | Notes | Ref |
|---|---|---|---|---|---|---|
| 2022 | Paper Rocket | Ilakiya | Tamil | ZEE5 | Web debut | |
| 2025 | Mayasabha | Anu Harika | Telugu | Sony LIV | | |
