= Sandiyar (upcoming film) =

Tamil-language film by S. U. Arun Kumar

- Film poster
- Directed by: S. U. Arun Kumar
- Written by: S. U. Arun Kumar
- Produced by: Kamal Haasan; R. Mahendran
- Starring: Kamal Haasan
- Cinematography: Sunil KS
- Music by: Anirudh Ravichander
- Production companies: Raaj Kamal Films International; Tumeric Media
- Country: India
- Language: Tamil

Sandiyar (transl. Ruffian) is an upcoming Indian Tamil-language action thriller film written and directed by S. U. Arun Kumar. Produced by Raaj Kamal Films International and Tumeric Media, the film stars Kamal Haasan.

The film was officially announced in September 2026. The official title was announced the following November, and principal photography commenced the same month. The music is composed by Anirudh Ravichander and cinematography is handled by Sunil KS.

== Cast ==
- Kamal Haasan

== Production ==
=== Development ===
In July 2026, reports emerged that Kamal Haasan was expected to collaborate with S. U. Arun Kumar. The project was speculated to be backed by Raaj Kamal Films International (RKFI), with Haasan expected to work on it after completing his commitments to the sequel of Kalki 2898 AD. RKFI initially teased the project on 3 September 2026, and confirmed the collaboration between Haasan and Arun Kumar on the same day.

In late October, The Times of India reported that the film was likely to be titled Sandiyar. The report also stated that a photoshoot for the film had been completed and that filming was expected to begin in November. On 6 November, a day before Hassan's birthday, RKFI officially revealed the title as Sandiyar.

Anirudh Ravichander was confirmed as the film's music composer, continuing his collaboration with Haasan following Vikram (2022) and Indian 2 (2024). Cinematographer Sunil KS, stunt choreographers Anbariv, production designer C. S. Balachander, and costume designer Amirtha Ram were also announced as members of the technical crew.

=== Filming ===
C. S. Balachander reportedly constructed large sets recreating the landscapes and streets of Madurai ahead of the commencement of principal photography commencement on 7 November 2026. Haasan had reportedly allocated 45-50 continuous days to complete his major portions of the film.

=== Title disputes ===
Sandiyar was the original title chosen for Haasan's 2004 film Virumaandi, and generated controversy in 2003 after objections from political groups, including Puthiya Tamilagam, led by K. Krishnasamy. The objections stemmed from concerns that the title could glorify caste-based violence, and Haasan eventually changed the title to Virumaandi. 23 years later, he reclaimed the original title. Krishnasamy again objected to the title, feeling Haasan was using it as a form of "revenge" to reflect his arrogance. On 11 November, he filed a petition seeking a ban on the title Sandiyar, and gave Haasan a 7-day deadline to change the film's title.

== Music ==
The soundtrack is composed by Anirudh Ravichander, in his third collaboration with Haasan after Vikram and Indian 2; first with Arun.
