= Sethupathi (film) =

2016 film by S. U. Arun Kumar

- Theatrical release poster
- Directed by: S. U. Arun Kumar
- Written by: S. U. Arun Kumar
- Produced by: Shan Sutharsan
- Starring: Vijay Sethupathi; Remya Nambessan
- Cinematography: Dinesh B. Krishnan
- Edited by: A. Sreekar Prasad
- Music by: Nivas K. Prasanna
- Production company: Vansan Movies
- Release date: 19 February 2016
- Running time: 122 minutes
- Country: India
- Language: Tamil

Sethupathi is a 2016 Indian Tamil-language action drama film written and directed by S. U. Arun Kumar and produced by Vansan Movies. The film stars Vijay Sethupathi and Remya Nambessan. It revolves around a police officer whose reputation suffers when a suspect is severely injured in his custody and threats from his enemies increase.

The film was released worldwide on 19 February 2016 and became a box office hit. It was remade in Telugu as Jayadev (2017).

== Plot ==
SI Subburaj, who is on night rounds in his C3 Station limits, is lured into a trap and burnt to death by a group of henchmen. Despite being burnt inside his station limits, he stumbles across a small bridge and dies inside C4 Station's limit. This causes tension to the planner of the attack. Sethupathi is the Crime Section's Inspector of C4 Station in Madurai who is awaiting his already-confirmed promotion to ACP. Subburaj's case is given to Sethupathi, who finds out that an influential politician, Vaathiyar of Melur, is behind the murder.

SI Kanagavel is married to Vaathiyar's daughter, but the marriage is an unhappy one. Due to consistent conflict, Vaathiyar tries to make peace between the couple. One day, Vathiyar's daughter comes to his home after being assaulted by Kanagavel. Therefore, Vaathiyar decides to kill Kanagavel. One the eve of the incident, Kanagavel faces an accident and is off-duty due to minor injury. Subburaj, who is attached as Crime SI in the same police station, is filling in for him.

Sethupathi arrests Vaathiyar during a temple festival and forces him to travel to Chennai to apply for bail, earning his enmity. Later, Sethupathi interrogates two adolescent schoolboys who had sold a stolen chain which was lost in a chain-snatching attempt. When they do not speak up, Sethupathi threatens to shoot them on the count of five, albeit using a locked gun. At the fifth count, he accidentally shoots one of the boys in the neck when the other tries to flee, leaving him critically injured. Sethupathi is charged with attempt-to-murder and is suspended.

However, he had no intention of shooting either of the boys and realises someone had unlocked his gun, which he had thought was locked. He soon finds out that Kanagavel is responsible for unlocking his gun. Kanagavel covertly bribes constable Muruganandham in C4 Station to unlock the gun and replace the bullets with dummy ones, so that Sethupathi will be defenceless when attacked by Vaathiyar's men.

Kanagavel assumes that if an inspector (who is investigating brutal murder of an SI) is attacked, the department will retaliate harshly to either kill or to put Vaathiyar in prison for life, so Kanagavel will be not be separated from his daughter. Kanagavel reveals the truth to the City Police Commissioner, and Commissioner tells him to repeat it in the enquiry commission, but the same night, Kanagavel is tied to a long-distance electric pole and burnt alive by Vaathiyar.

Sethupathi and Muruganandham appear before an enquiry of three officials to prove the former's innocence. However, one of the members of the enquiry panel is an ally of Vaathiyar and she tries to influence the panel against Sethupathi. Muruganandham's daughter is kidnapped minutes before the final enquiry, and he turns against Sethupathi. The same evening, the Commissioner and Regional Civil Commissioner visit Muruganandham's home and uncover the truth.

Since these two officers are on the committee, Sethupathi's job is saved. However, Sethupathi's troubles are still not over; Vaathiyar starts targeting Sethupathi and his family. Sethupathi overcomes all the hurdles put by Vaathiyar and his henchmen. Vaathiyar then decides to silence Sethupathi once and for all by sending his henchmen to kill Sethupathi's wife Malarvizhi and two children, but Sethupathi's son, who is aware of the police work, wields Sethupathi's armed revolver to ward them off.

Infuriated with the failed attempt, Vaathiyar instructs his men to kill the schoolboy injured by Sethupathi and put the blame on him. However, Sethupathi, aware of Vaathiyar's plan, guards the hospital where the boy is admitted and saves him from Vaathiyar's henchmen. With Sethupathi returning to work, Vaathiyar's henchmen accept defeat and warn Vaathiyar to leave Madurai for good, but he does not take heed. The next day, Sethupathi kills Vaathiyar by setting his house on fire and closes the case.

== Cast ==
- Vijay Sethupathi as Kalimuthu Sethupathi
- Remya Nambessan as Malarvizhi
- Vela Ramamoorthy as Vaathiyar
- Mime Gopi as Anbuselvan
- Vivek Prasanna as Madhivaanan
- Linga as Shenbaga Moorthy
- Master Raghavan as Mara
- Redin Kingsley as Raja
- TSR Srinivasan as B. V. Kumar
- Baby Thanushra
- Muruganandham
- Karuppu Nambiar
- Francis
- Murugan
- Santhanalakshmi

== Production ==
Sethupathi is S. U. Arun Kumar's sophomore directorial venture. Vijay Sethupathi, who played the lead in Arun Kumar's directorial debut Pannaiyarum Padminiyum (2014), returned as the lead actor. He initially suggested titling the film Ka. Sethupathi, but the director did not agree. Before Remya Nambessan was cast as the lead actress, a number of actresses refused the film; Sethupathi believed it was because of their reluctance to play a motherly role. Because he plays a police officer, Sethupathi sported a handlebar moustache. He initially wanted the character to be clean shaven, but Arun felt that look would not be appealing enough. Arun sought to make Sethupathi's character a realistic and believable police officer, in contrast to other Tamil films where he felt police officers were outrageously depicted. Principal photography began in late September 2015. The film was primarily shot in Madurai. The entire filming process took place over a single schedule.

== Soundtrack ==
The film's music was composed by Nivas K. Prasanna. The audio launch was held on 20 January 2016.

Track listing
No.	Title	Lyrics	Singer(s)	Length
1.	"Mazhai Thooralam"	Na. Muthukumar	Nivas K. Prasanna	5:40
2.	"Konji Pesida Venaam"	Na. Muthukumar	K. S. Chithra, Sriram Parthasarathy	3:47
3.	"Hey Mama"	Na. Muthukumar, Blaaze	Anirudh Ravichander, Blaaze, MK Balaji	4:29
4.	"Hawa Hawa"	MK Balaji	Karthik, Saindhavi	4:16
5.	"Thaen Kootil"	Na. Muthukumar	V. M. Mahalingam	3:43
Total length:				22:09

== Critical reception ==
Vishal Menon of The Hindu said that Sethupathi was a good thriller and a better family drama. Latha Srinivasan of Daily News and Analysis wrote that there were no loud over-the-top dialogues and punchlines that were typical of all on-screen cops in Tamil films and Vijay Sethupathi had outshone many other Tamil film heroes as the cop. Malini Mannath of The New Indian Express wrote that it is another feather in the cap for Sethupathi, who reveals his versatility yet again handles his role with remarkable understanding. Anupama Subramaniam of Deccan Chronicle wrote that "Vijay Sethupathi's moves are full of energy and enthusiasm and his impeccable dialogue delivery is a treat to watch." Sify wrote, "The biggest strength of the film is the fine characterization of Vijay Sethupathi and his effortless performance".

== Accolades ==
At the 6th South Indian International Movie Awards, K. S. Chithra won the award for Best Playback Female Singer.
