= Enakku Vaaitha Adimaigal =

2017 Tamil film by Mahendran Rajamani

- Theatrical release poster
- Directed by: Mahendran Rajamani
- Written by: Mahendran Rajamani
- Produced by: Shan Sutharsan
- Starring: Jai; Pranitha; Karunakaran; Kaali Venkat; Naveen George Thomas
- Cinematography: Mahesh Muthuswami
- Edited by: Gopi Krishna
- Music by: Santhosh Dhayanidhi
- Production company: Vansan Movies
- Release date: 2 February 2017
- Running time: 134 minutes
- Country: India
- Language: Tamil

Enakku Vaaitha Adimaigal (transl. The slaves destined to me) is a 2017 Indian Tamil-language comedy drama film written and directed by Mahendran Rajamani and produced by Shan Sutharsan. The film stars Jai and Pranitha, with Karunakaran, Kaali Venkat and Naveen George Thomas in supporting roles. Featuring music composed by Santhosh Dhayanidhi and cinematography by Mahesh Muthuswami, the film began production during June 2016 and was released on 2 February 2017.

== Plot ==
The film revolves around Krishna, who works in an IT company. He has three friends: Ramesh, a bank cashier; Moideen, an auto driver; and Sowmya, a call center executive. Krishna goes on a vacation with his colleagues, where he falls in love with his colleague Divya. Everything goes fine in the initial few days, and their love life is a bliss. One day, Divya breaks up with Krishna, citing a reason that she is going to marry someone else. Krishna gets heartbroken and depressed, so he consults a psychiatrist named Muthu Vinayagam for counsel. Muthu listens to Krishna's story and advises him to get in touch with his friends whenever he feels depressed. As a result, Krishna reaches out to his three friends, who turn out to be busy with their personal lives and do not pay heed to his words. Krishna becomes dejected, rents a lodge, and gets drunk. He calls up his friends and threatens them that he is about to commit suicide. Realizing that their friend is in serious trouble, they immediately act upon to reach out to him. As they are unaware of his location, they are not able to find him. During the search process, all three of them get into various troubles for no fault of their own. Despite the troubles, will they be able to reach out to their friend and stop his suicide constitutes the rest of the story.

== Cast ==
- Jai as Krishna
- Pranitha as Divya
- Karunakaran as Ramesh
- Kaali Venkat as Mohideen Basha
- Naveen George Thomas as Sowmya Narayanan
- Thambi Ramaiah as Muthu Vinayagam
- Rajendran as Karuppu Rock
- R. N. R. Manohar as Krishna's father
- G. Marimuthu as Police Inspector
- John Ranjith as Rubesh
- Maaran as Sowmya Narayanan's friend
- Easter as Dhanapal
- Kothandam
- Antony
- Kalloori Vinoth as Sowmya Narayanan's friend
- Bhama as Parvathy
- Lollu Sabha Manohar
- Cool Suresh as Rishi
- Vinitha as Fathima, Mohideen Basha's wife
- Balambika as Sowmya Narayanan's mother
- Supergood Subramani as Ramesh's father
- Sai Priyanka Ruth as Vanathi
- TSR Srinivasan
- Santhanam as himself (guest appearance)
- Badava Gopi as himself (guest appearance)
- Anjali as Sandhya (guest appearance)

== Production ==
In March 2016, Mahendran Rajamani and Vansan Movies held discussions with actors Siddharth, Nakul and Thaman about casting them in a script titled Enakku Vaaitha Adimaigal. Despite Thaman's announcement that the trio would reunite again after Boys 2003), the project failed to materialise. Soon after, Vansan Movies announced that they had instead signed on actor Jai to be a part of a film in early June 2016. Pranitha joined the team to portray the lead actress, while Karunakaran, Kaali Venkat and theatre actor Naveen were selected to portray Jai's friends. Thambi Ramaiah and Rajendran were also bought in to portray characters in the film, with the latter copying the body language of American actor Dwayne Johnson for his role. The film was officially launched on 22 June 2016, with a poster of the film released depicting the technical crew as a part of a WhatsApp group conversation. The film was shot extensively in the final quarter of 2016 across Kodaikanal and Puducherry. In December 2016, Santhanam shot for a cameo appearance in the film.

== Release ==
The film was initially announced to be releasing on 14 January 2017, during the Pongal holidays in Tamil Nadu, but was later delayed after most screens were handed to the Vijay-starrer Bairavaa. The film was subsequently released on 2 February.

=== Reception ===
Sify.com called the film "a slow paced comedy entertainer, which evokes some laughter at a few places" stating that Mahendran Rajamani "has some sharp and funny dialogues" but "however, his direction lacks the punch and pace required for such a multi-layered film". Likewise, The New Indian Express wrote "a promising work of a debutant maker, the film could have done with more punch and fizz" adding that "the dialogue is laced with sparkling one-liners which to an extent manages to keep the narration lively". The critic from Times of India compared the film to Kappal (2014), while giving the film a mixed review.

== Soundtrack ==
Enakku Vaaitha Adimaigal

Soundtrack album by Santhosh Dhayanidhi
- Released: 26 December 2016
- Genre: Feature film soundtrack
- Length: 11:07
- Label: Vansan Music; Divo
- Producer: Santhosh Dhayanidhi

Santhosh Dhayanidhi chronology
Mo (2016)	Enakku Vaaitha Adimaigal (2016)	Kattappava Kanom (2017)

Santhosh Dhayanidhi was signed on as music composer and revealed that the director had given him a brief of producing "an anthem kind of number on friendship". Looking for a renowned singer, Santosh requested Anirudh Ravichander to sing that particular song in the film. The soundtrack also features a gaana number sung by Jagan, a YouTube find and a melody song by Haricharan and Jonita Gandhi. The audio rights of the film was acquired by Vansan Music, a subsidiary of the production house, and the complete album was released on 26 December 2016.

Tamil (Original)
No.	Title	Lyrics	Singer(s)	Length
1.	"Ondroduthan Ondroga"	Kabilan	Anirudh Ravichander, Santhosh Dhayanidhi, Chennai Boys Choir	3:28
2.	"Kannadi Poovukku"	Kabilan	Haricharan, Jonita Gandhi	3:59
3.	"Mannenna Vepenna"	Comedy Bazaar Maaran	Dolak Jagan, Mukesh Mohamed, Chennai Boys Choir	3:40
