= Pannaiyarum Padminiyum =

2014 Indian film by S. U. Arun Kumar

- Theatrical release poster
- Directed by: S. U. Arun Kumar
- Written by: S. U. Arun Kumar
- Based on: Pannaiyarum Padminiyum (short) by S. U. Arun Kumar
- Produced by: M. R. Ganesh
- Starring: Vijay Sethupathi; Jayaprakash; Tulasi; Aishwarya Rajesh
- Cinematography: Gokul Benoy
- Edited by: A. Sreekar Prasad
- Music by: Justin Prabhakaran
- Production company: Magicbox Films
- Release date: 7 February 2014
- Running time: 152 minutes
- Country: India
- Language: Tamil

Pannaiyarum Padminiyum (transl. The Landlord and Padmini) is a 2014 Indian Tamil-language comedy drama film written and directed by S. U. Arun Kumar, adapted from his eponymous short film. It stars Vijay Sethupathi, Jayaprakash, Thulasi and Aishwarya Rajesh, with Bala Saravanan, Neelima Rani, and Mahadevan in supporting roles. Sneha and Attakathi Dinesh appear in brief roles. The film revolves around an ageing landlord and his love for his vintage car, a Premier Padmini.

Pannaiyarum Padminiyum is the feature directorial debut of Arun Kumar. The film was announced in early 2013 and finished filming by that July. Music for the film was composed by debutant Justin Prabhakaran, editing was handled by A. Sreekar Prasad and cinematography by Gokul Binoy.

Pannaiyarum Padminiyum was released on 7 February 2014 and was well received by critics, but did not perform well at the box office. It won six Tamil Nadu State Film Awards, including Third Best Film.

== Plot ==
The film begins with a young man buying a new car. He says that his inspiration is a Pannaiyar (landlord) in his village and his love for a vintage car.

Pannaiyar and his wife Chellamma are kind-hearted and broadminded people who are responsible for introducing essential technologies like TV, radio, telephones, etc., to their villagers. The villagers also enjoy the liberty of using all these items with his permission. The couple have a married daughter named Suja, who is greedy. Whenever she visits, she makes it a point to take whichever gadget she fancies.

One day, Pannaiyar's friend Shanmugam comes to his house with his brand new Fiat Premier Padmini car and Pannaiyar is instantly awestruck by the latest car's features. To Pannaiyar's surprise and happiness, Shanmugam says that he will leave the car for a few months under Pannaiyar's care since he is going to visit his pregnant daughter and asks Pannaiyar to use the car as he wishes. An excited Pannaiyar takes care of it like a prized possession. Since he does not know how to drive, he appoints a young man named Murugesan as the driver and the household servant Peedai as the cleaner. Pannaiyar and Chellamma treat them like their own sons. School-going kids often swarm around the car, asking for a ride in the front seat, and one little boy in particular is very much interested, so Peedai jokingly asks him to bring five rupees to get a front seat ride, and the boy starts saving his daily pocket money. Like all the other facilities belonging to Pannaiyar, the villagers also get to use the car for their emergency purposes. On one such day, when Murugesan is helping a family at a funeral, he comes across a beautiful girl named Malarvizhi among the mourners. He is attracted to her instantly and she also falls for him, and they start to love each other.

One night, Chellamma requests her husband to learn driving before their wedding anniversary so that they can go to the temple together, he obliges. Pannaiyar is determined to learn driving and asks Murugesan to train him. Murugesan fears that he will lose his job if Pannaiyar learns driving, so he procrastinates as much as he can. So, Pannaiyar's driving progress is very slow. Meanwhile, Shanmugam's daughter unexpectedly visits them and says that her father has suddenly died. Pannaiyar is shocked to hear about the loss of his friend and hands over the car keys and the documents that Shanmugam left under his care. But the daughter leaves the car behind as a token of remembrance of her father. Now that they are the proud owners of the car, the Pannaiyar family is happy, and certain heartwarming incidents change Murugesan's mind and he wholeheartedly plans to teach Pannaiyar to drive, but during one of his lessons, Pannaiyar causes an accident that creates minor damages to the car, which starts having technical difficulties from then onwards.

Meanwhile, Suja visits her parents and her eyes fall on the new car and she demands for it. Unable to refuse, Pannaiyar halfheartedly lets her take it, much to the disappointment of Murugesan and Chellamma. On Pannaiyar and Chellamma's wedding anniversary, as the family is preparing to get into a bullock cart to go to the temple, they see an irate Suja coming to their house with the car. She says that she and her husband would have been in an accident because the car stopped working and insults her father for giving a useless old car. Chellamma steps in and scolds her and Suja storms away angrily, leaving the car behind. Murugesan, Pannaiyar and Chellamma dismiss Suja's tantrum and are rather pleased that their car is finally back. They try to start the car but it would not start. In utter frustration, Peedai jumps over the car and sits on the bonnet, and suddenly it starts. Finally, as per their earlier plan, Pannaiyar manages to drive successfully and take his wife Chellamma in his own car to the temple on their anniversary. They even race a bus driver, who was being a bully for quite a while.

Meanwhile, the little boy who saved money to get a front seat ride sadly leaves out of town for higher studies without his wish fulfilled. Years later, that boy turns out to be the young man who bought a new car at the beginning of the movie. He visits his hometown and searches for the old car in Pannaiyar's house. Murugesan sees the man and asks if he needs a ride to the town. The man says yes and finally sits in the front seat of the car, and his longtime wish is fulfilled at last as they drive away.

== Cast ==
- Vijay Sethupathi as Murugesan
- Jayaprakash as Pannaiyar
- Tulasi as Chellamma
- Aishwarya Rajesh as Malarvizhi
- Bala Saravanan as Peedai
- Sneha as Shanmugam's daughter (guest appearance)
- Attakathi Dinesh as the narrator (guest appearance)
- Neelima Rani as Suja
- Mahadevan as Shanmugam

== Production ==
Pannaiyarum Padminiyum is based on the director S. U. Arun Kumar's short film of the same name, which was screened during the reality show Naalaiya Iyakkunar. Arun Kumar retained the main characters but tried creating a largely new story. He cited the films Hachiko, The Pursuit of Happyness and The Way Home as inspirations. The feature film adaptation was formally launched in January 2013, and was still in pre-production a month later. A large set worth ₹40 lakh (equivalent to ₹74 lakh or US$79,000 in 2026) was constructed for the film during shooting at Alagar Kovil, Madurai. Filming also took place in and around Madurai. Principal photography ended in July 2013.

== Soundtrack ==
The soundtrack was composed by Justin Prabhakaran, in his feature film debut. A single track "Onakkaga Poranthaenae" was released on 23 August 2013, and the audio launch was held on 22 November. The songs "Onakkaga Poranthaene" and another song "Pesuren Pesuren" attained popularity. Karthik of Milliblog wrote, "Barring a song and that odd singing misstep, this is a mighty strong debut by Justin Prabhakaran!".

Track listing
No.	Title	Lyrics	Singer(s)	Length
1.	"Enga Ooru Vandi"	Justin Prabhakaran	Akhilesh, Allen, Gowtham, Haripriya, Anjana, Yazhini, Neyveli Sriram	05:14
2.	"Onakkaga Poranthaenae"	Vaali	Balaram, Sandhya, S. P. B. Charan, Anu Anand	04:52
3.	"Kadhal Vandhaacho"	Justin Prabhakaran	Karthik, Prashanthini	05:23
4.	"Pesuraen Pesuraen"	Vaali	Justin Prabhakaran, Vairam, Pandiyamma, Thaayamma	04:31
5.	"Enakkaaga Poranthaayae"	Vaali	S. P. B. Charan, Anu Anand	03:41
Total length:				23:43

== Marketing and release ==
To promote Pannaiyarum Padminiyum, the makers took two cars on a "road show"; one car started from Coimbatore and another from Nagercoil, both headed to Chennai. The film was released in theatres on 7 February 2014. It was later screened in many international film festivals such as Jagran Film Festival, Prague International Film Festival, Habitat Film Festival, the 12th Chennai International Film Festival (CIFF) and the 7th Bengaluru International Film Festival (BIFFES) in which it won the special jury award. It was the only Tamil film selected to be screened at the 19th International Film Festival of Kerala (IFFK).

=== Critical reception ===
Baradwaj Rangan, writing for The Hindu, described the film as "sweetly old-fashioned" but felt that "developments have been dreamed up simply to pad out the running time" and that "the scenes and characters (added to make a feature film from a short), sometimes, feel like editing-room discards that are rightfully DVD extras". Sify called it "a feel good and charming emotional drama" but that the length was "the film's Achilles heels as it stretches and goes on and on, making it boring at times". IANS gave it 4.5/5 and wrote, "In a list featuring films that tug at your heart strings, Pannaiyarum Padminiyum deserves to be right on the top. An emotionally uplifting work, the film steers away from the commercial zone by constantly rewarding us with characters that not just entertain but stay with us hours after we leave the cinema hall". M Suganth of The Times of India gave the film 3.5/5 and wrote, "Expanding his much-loved short film into a full-length feature, Arunkumar shows that he is a capable storyteller. He takes his time spinning his yarn but there is an assuredness in the telling that keeps you hooked". S Saraswathi of Rediff.com gave the film 3/5 and called it "refreshing" and "a realistic story about the lives of ordinary people and their simple desires".

=== Accolades ===
Pannaiyarum Padminiyum won in six categories at the Tamil Nadu State Film Awards: Third Best Film, Special Prize for Best Actor (Sethupathi), Best Male Character Artist (Jayaprakash), Best Female Character Artist (Thulasi), Best Male Playback Singer (S. P. B. Charan) and Best Female Playback Singer (Sandhya).

== Potential remake ==
Even before the release of Pannaiyarum Padminiyum, actor Nani had purchased the Telugu remake rights of the film.
