= List of Tamil film actors =

This list outlines the names of notable male film actors, who previously worked or are currently working in the Tamil film industry, based in Chennai, Tamil Nadu, India. The list is ordered by the year of their debut as a leading actor.

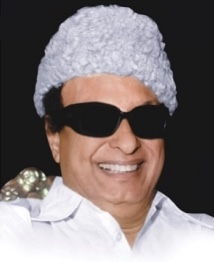
1930s: M. G. Ramachandran

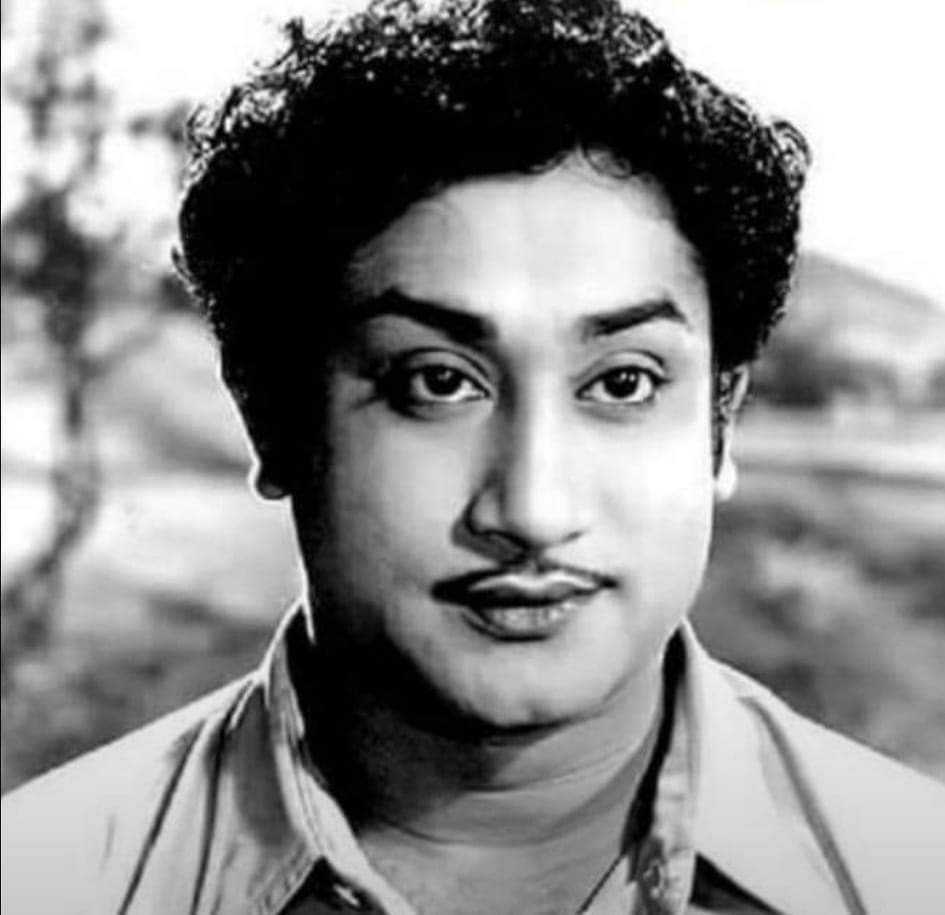
1950s: Sivaji Ganesan

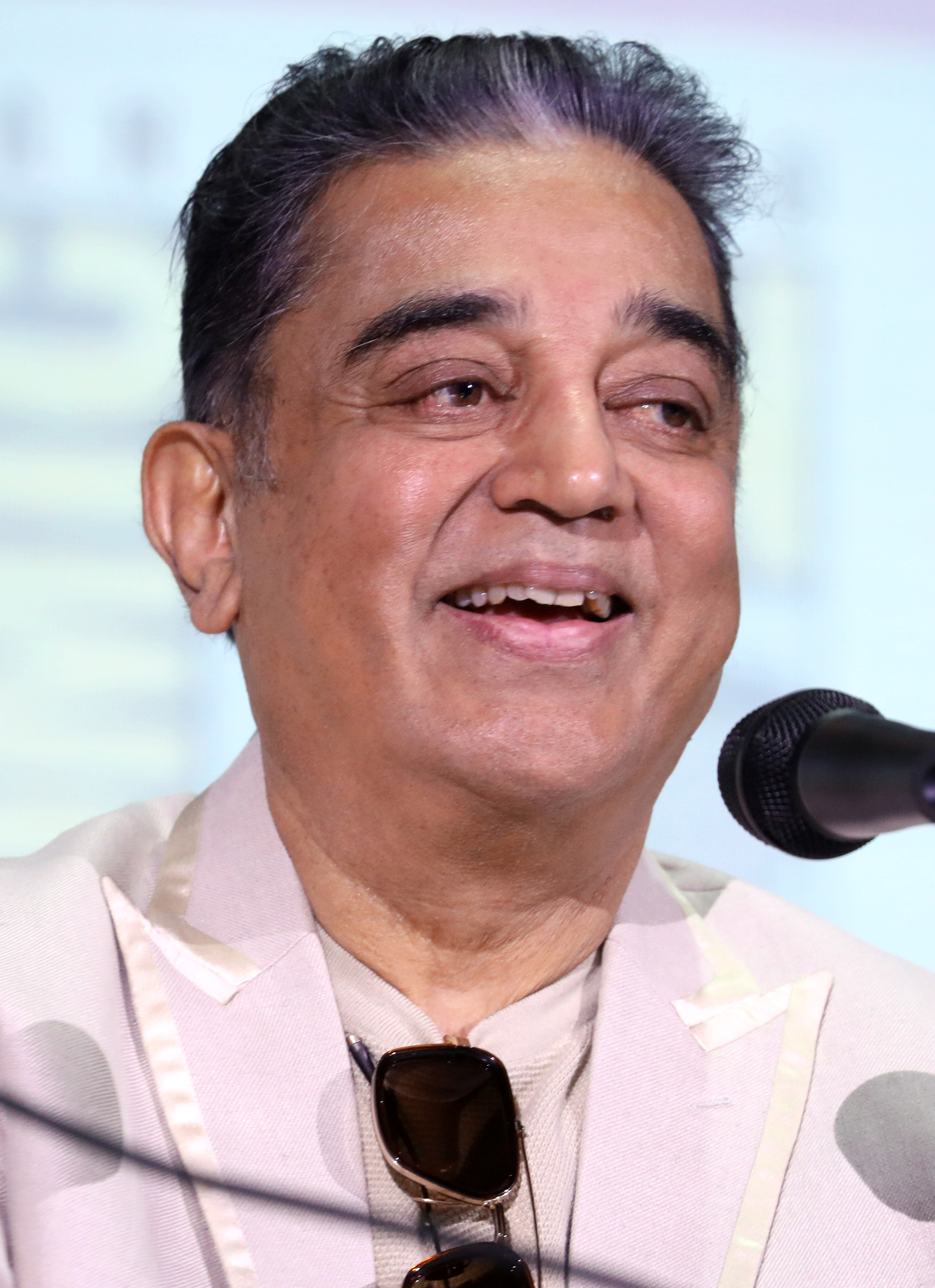
1960s: Kamal Haasan

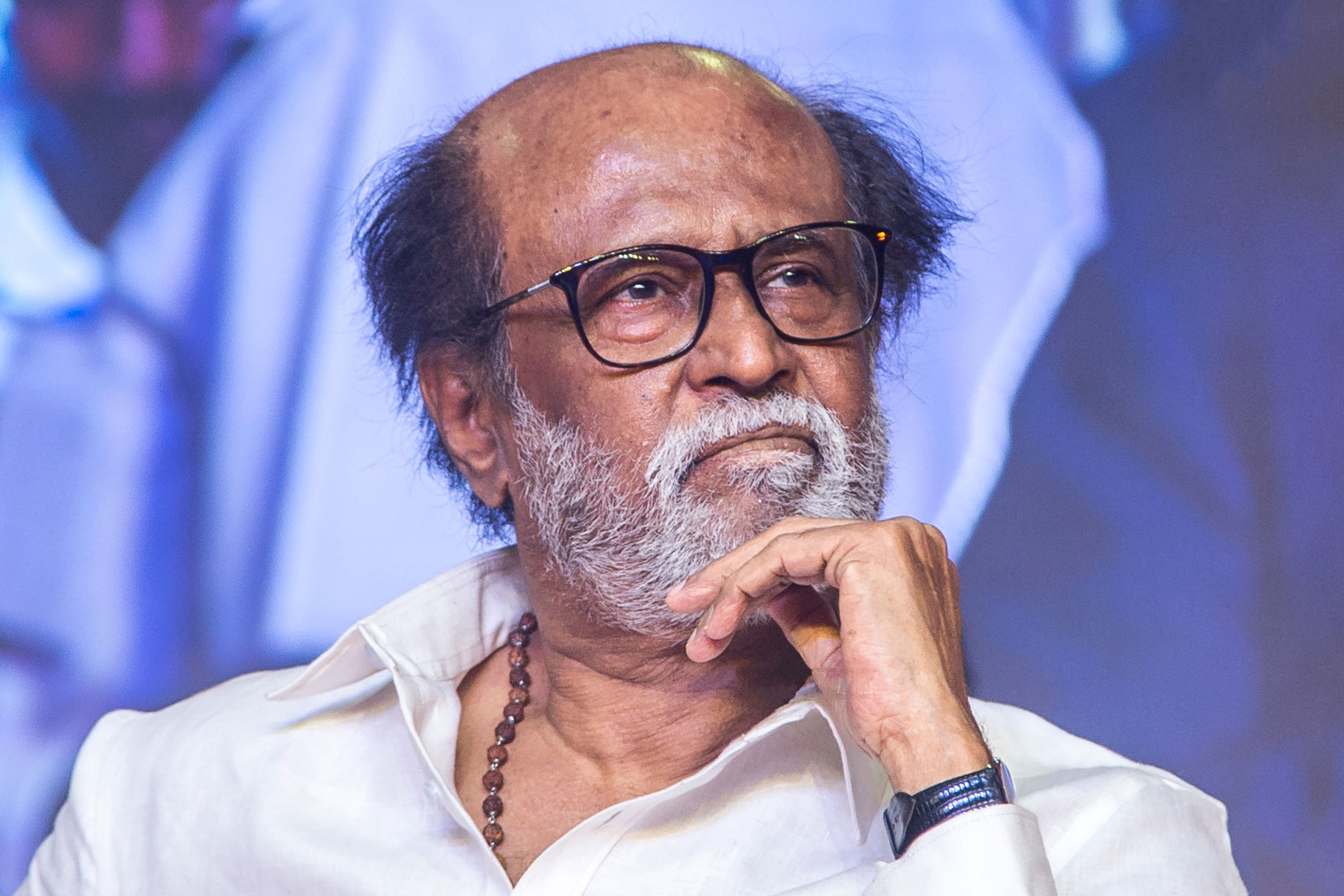
1970s: Rajinikanth

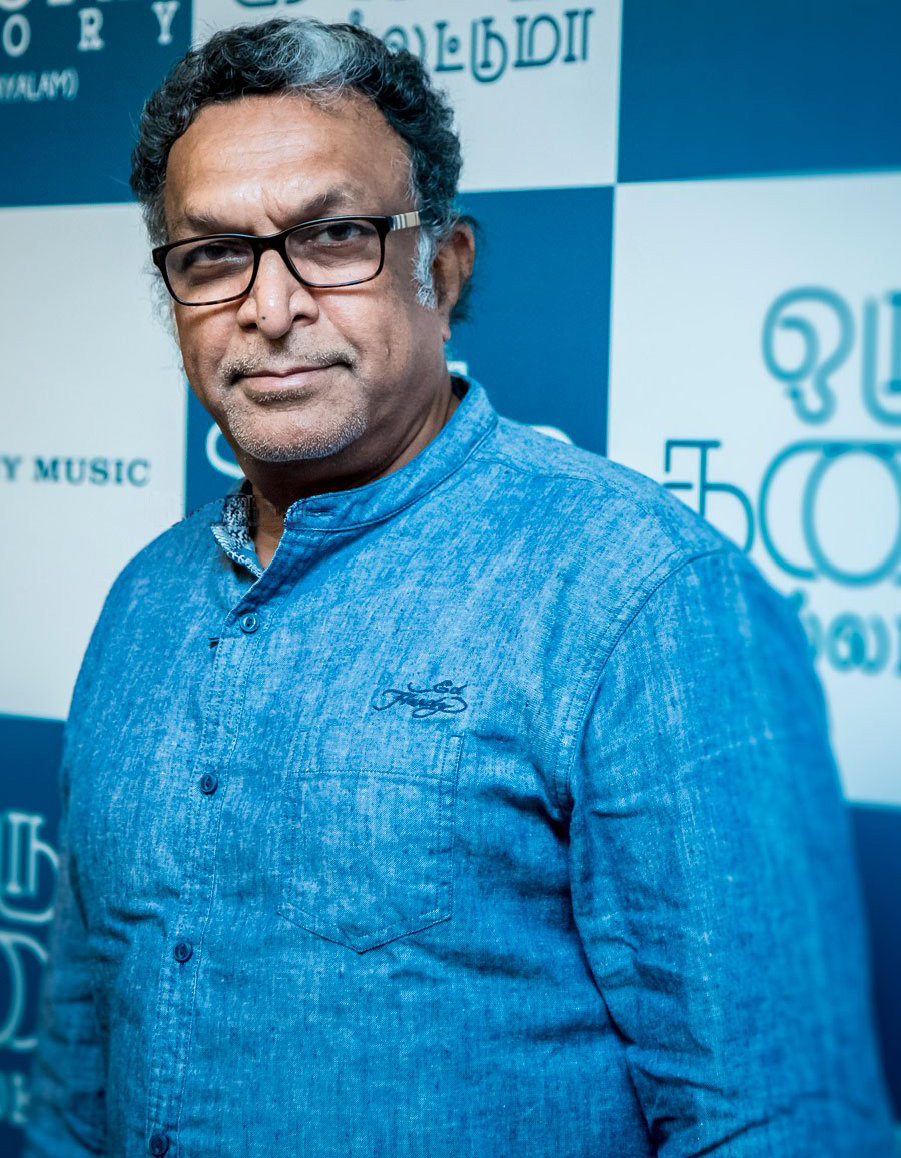
1980s: Nassar

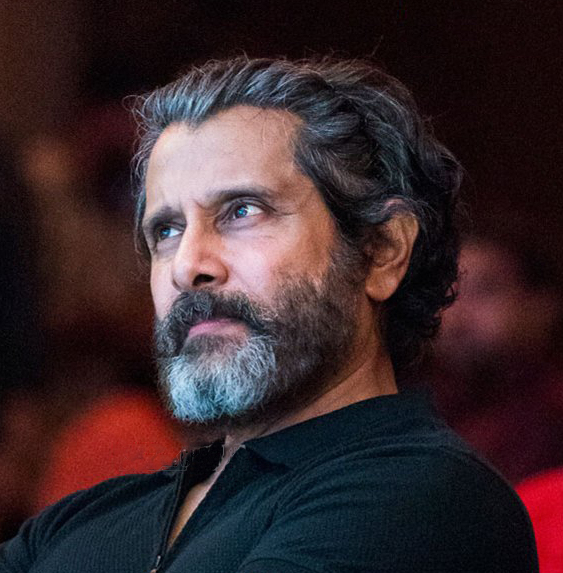
1990s: Vikram

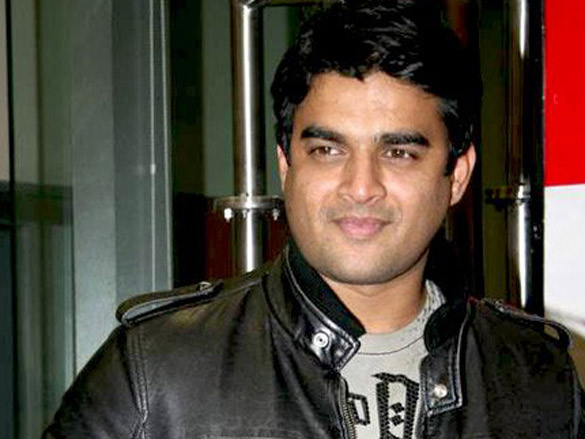
2000s: Madhavan

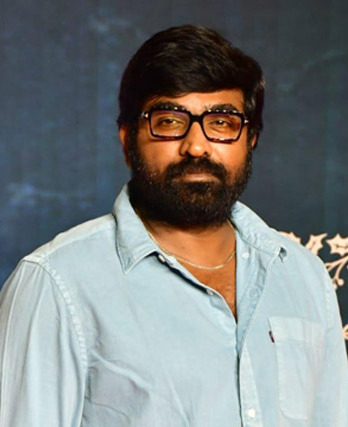
2010s: Vijay Sethupathi

== 1930s ==
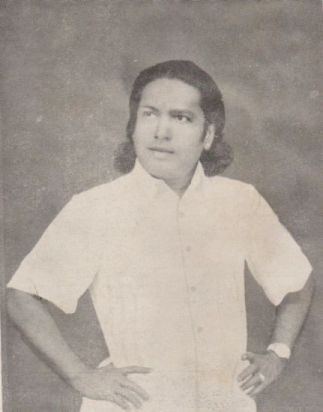
P. U. Chinnappa

Year	Name	Debut film	Other notable films
1934	M. K. Thyagaraja Bhagavathar	Pavalakkodi	Ambikapathy (1937), Haridas (1944), Amarakavi (1952)
1936	P. U. Chinnappa	Chandrakantha	Uthama Puthiran (1940), Harichandra (1944), Jagathalapratapan (1944)
1936	M. G. Ramachandran	Sathi Leelavathi	Nadodi Mannan (1958), Rickshawkaran (1971), Ulagam Sutrum Valiban (1973)

== 1940s ==
Year	Name	Debut film	Other notable films
1946	M. N. Nambiar	Vidyapathi	Nadodi Mannan (1958), Enga Veettu Pillai (1965), Ninaithadhai Mudippavan (1975)
1947	Gemini Ganesan	Miss Malini	Vanjikottai Valiban (1958), Kalyana Parisu (1959), Naan Avanillai (1974)
1947	M. K. Mustafa	Kanjan	Abimanyu (1948), Kaithi (1951), Sivagangai Seemai (1959), Harichandra (1968)

== 1950s ==
Year	Name	Debut film	Other notable films
1952	Sivaji Ganesan	Parasakthi	Veerapandiya Kattabomman (1959), Deiva Magan (1969), Mudhal Mariyathai (1985)
1952	S. S. Rajendran	Parasakthi	Mudhalali (1957), Poompuhar (1964), Pazhani (1965)
1954	M. R. Radha	Ratha Kanneer	Paava Mannippu (1961), Bale Pandiya (1962), Karpagam (1963)
1957	R. Muthuraman	Karpukkarasi	Nenjil Or Aalayam (1962), Kadhalikka Neramillai (1964), Ooty Varai Uravu (1967)
1958	Nagesh	Manamulla Maruthaaram	Server Sundaram (1964), Neerkumizhi (1965), Ethir Neechal (1968)

== 1960s ==
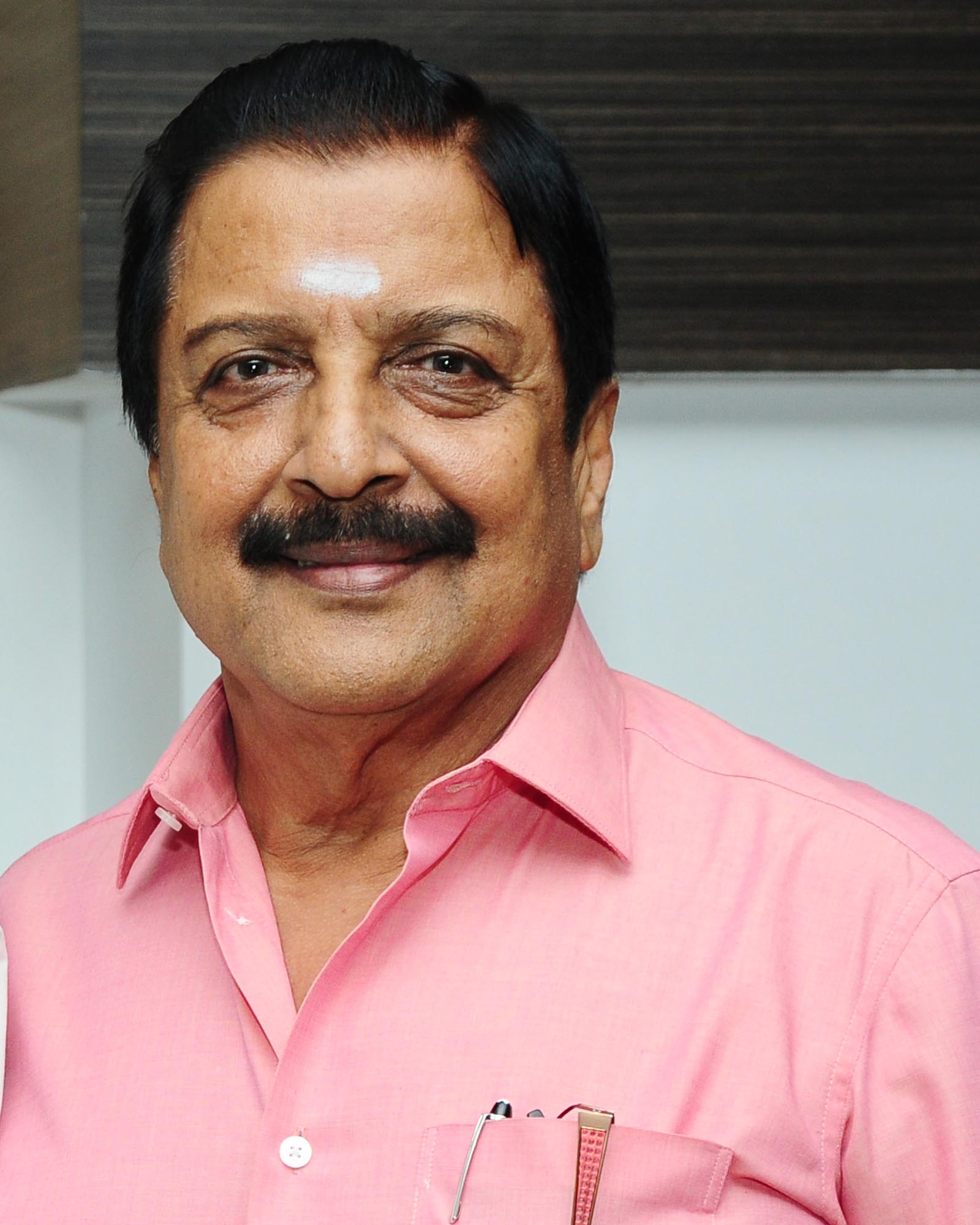
Sivakumar

Year	Name	Debut film	Other notable films
1963	A. V. M. Rajan	Naanum Oru Penn	Veera Abhimanyu (1965), Thillana Mohanambal (1968), Dheivam (1972)
1964	Ravichandran	Kadhalikka Neramillai	Adhey Kangal (1967), Justice Viswanathan (1971), Sabatham (1971)
1965	Sivakumar	Kaakum Karangal	Rosaappo Ravikkai Kaari (1979), Sindhu Bhairavi (1985), Marupakkam (1990)
1965	Jaishankar	Iravum Pagalum	Vallavan Oruvan (1966), CID Shankar (1970), Nootrukku Nooru (1971)

== 1970s ==
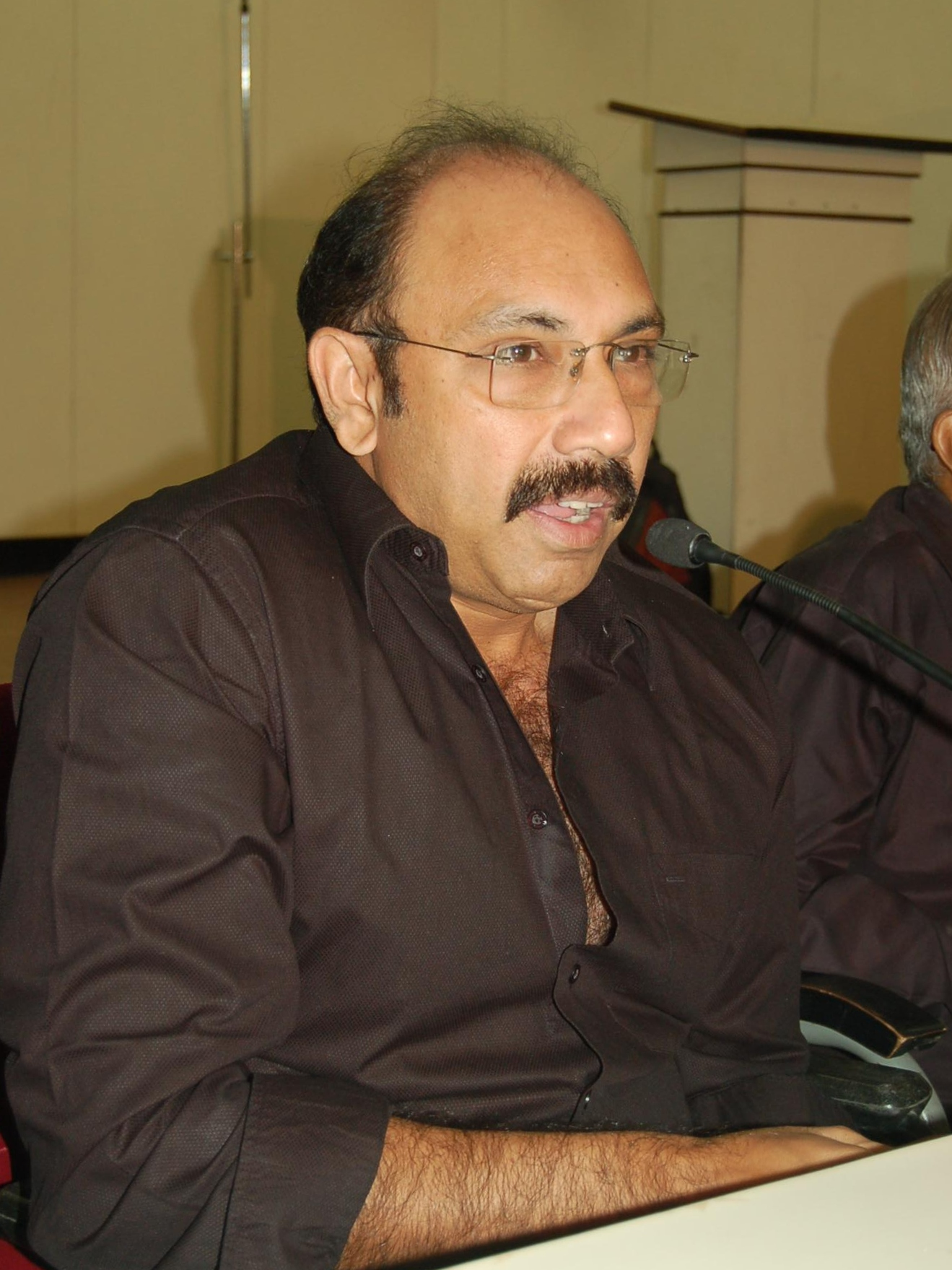
Sathyaraj

Year	Name	Debut film	Other notable films
1973	Kamal Haasan	Arangetram	Apoorva Raagangal (1975), Moondram Pirai (1983), Nayakan (1987), Indian (1996), Dasavathaaram (2008), Vikram (2022)
1973	Vijayakumar	Ponnukku Thanga Manasu	Aval Oru Thodar Kathai (1974), Agni Natchathiram (1988), Nattamai (1994)
1975	Rajinikanth	Apoorva Raagangal	Mullum Malarum (1978), Baashha (1995), Padayappa (1999), Chandramukhi (2005), Sivaji (2007), Enthiran (2010), Kabali (2016), 2.0 (2018), Jailer (2023)
1978	Sathyaraj	Sattam En Kaiyil	Vedham Pudhithu (1987), Amaithipadai (1994), Baahubali: The Beginning (2015)
1978	Sarath Babu	Nizhal Nijamagiradhu	Mullum Malarum (1978), Nenjathai Killathe (1980), Muthu (1995)
1978	Sudhakar	Kizhake Pogum Rail	Niram Maaratha Pookkal (1979), Enga Ooru Rasathi (1980), Rusi Kanda Poonai (1980)
1978	Vijayan	Kizhake Pogum Rail	Uthiripookkal (1979), Pasi (1979), Niram Maaratha Pookkal (1979)
1979	Rajesh	Kanni Paruvathile	Andha 7 Naatkal (1981), Anal Kaatru (1983), Achamillai Achamillai (1984)
1979	Bhagyaraj	Puthiya Vaarpugal	Mundhanai Mudichu (1983), Chinna Veedu (1985), Oru Oorla Oru Rajakumari (1995)
1979	Vijayakanth	Inikkum Ilamai	Sattam Oru Iruttarai (1981), Vaidehi Kathirunthal (1984), Amman Kovil Kizhakale (1986), Captain Prabhakaran (1991), Chinna Gounder (1992), Vaanathaippola (2000), Ramanaa (2002)
1979	Pratap Pothen	Azhiyatha Kolangal	Moodu Pani (1980), Nenjathai Killathe (1980), Meendum Oru Kaathal Kathai (1985)
1979	Suman	Neechal Kulam	Ellam Inba Mayyam (1981), Thee (1981), Sivaji (2007), Kuruvi (2008)

== 1980s ==
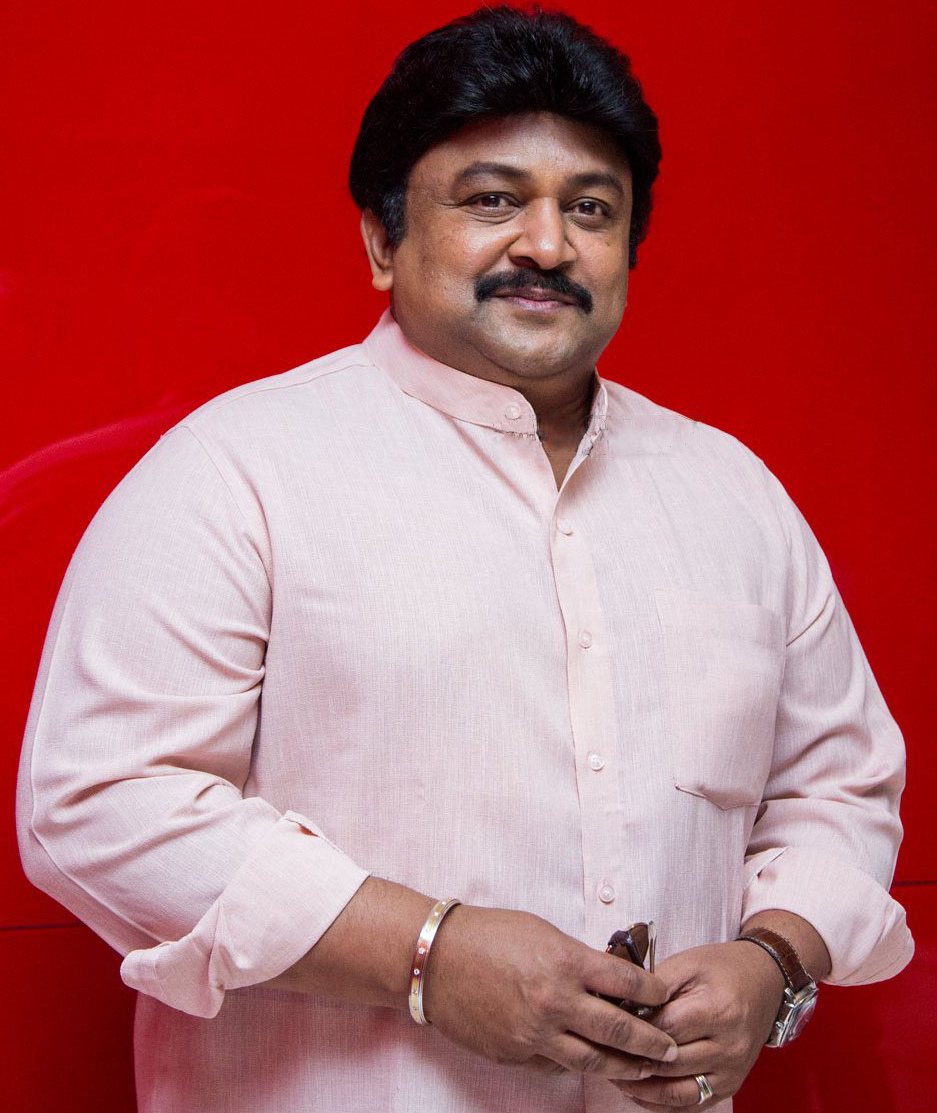
Prabhu

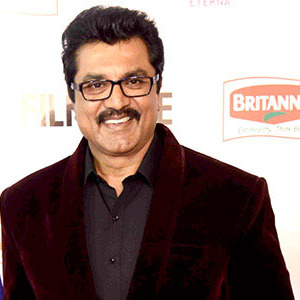
Sarathkumar

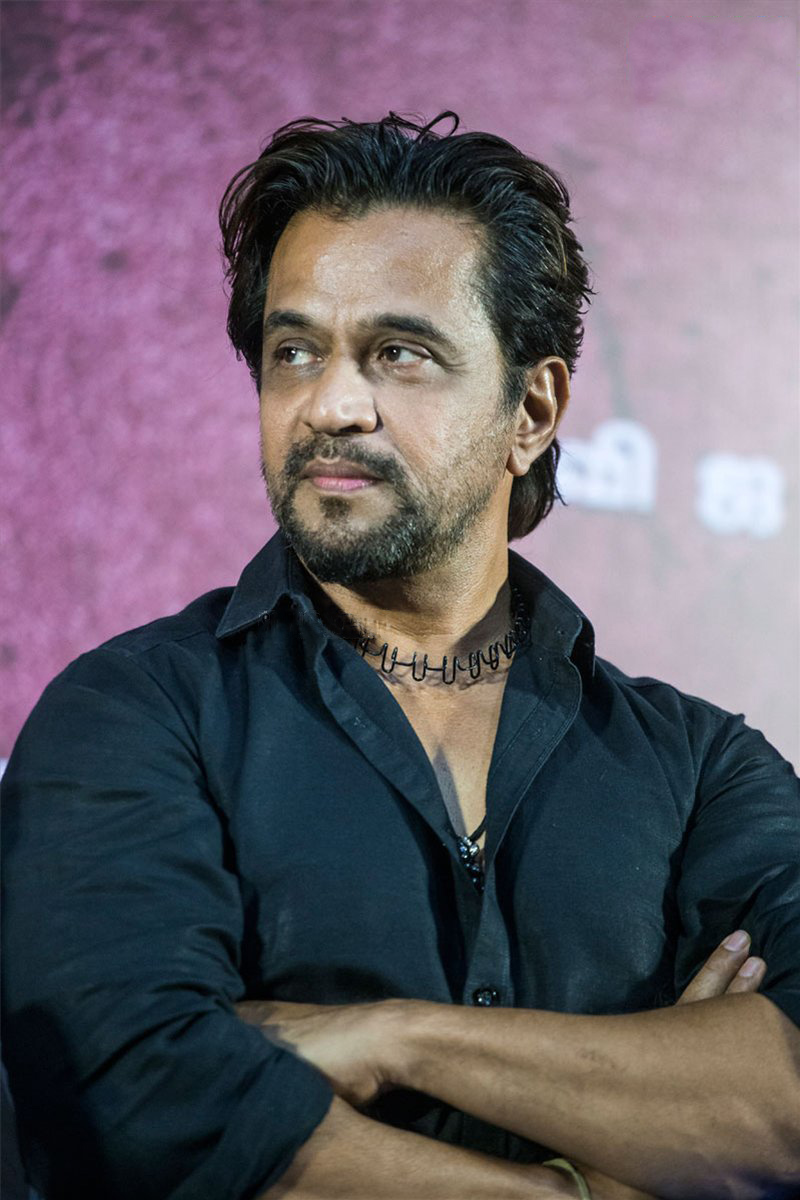
Arjun

Year	Name	Debut film	Other notable films
1980	Mohan	Moodu Pani	Payanangal Mudivathillai (1982), Mouna Ragam (1986), Mella Thirandhathu Kadhavu (1987)
1980	Raveendran	Oru Thalai Ragam	Echchil Iravugal (1982), En Priyame (1983), Adutha Varisu (1983)
1980	Shankar	Oru Thalai Ragam	Sujatha (1980), Kanalukku Karaiyethu (1982), Kadhal Enum Nadhiyinile (1989)
1980	Chandrasekhar	Oru Thalai Ragam	Palaivana Solai (1981), Oomai Vizhigal (1986), Nanba Nanba (2002)
1980	Nizhalgal Ravi	Nizhalgal	Nayakan (1987), Ore Oru Gramathiley (1989), Adhisaya Manithan (1990)
1980	S. Ve. Sekhar	Varumayin Niram Sivappu	Kudumbam Oru Kadambam (1981), Manal Kayiru (1982), Poove Poochooda Vaa (1985)
1981	Rajeev	Rail Payanangalil	Palaivana Solai (1981), Nizhal Thedum Nenjangal (1982), Chain Jayapal (1985)
1981	Visu	Kudumbam Oru Kadambam	Chidambara Rahasiyam (1985), Samsaram Adhu Minsaaram (1986), Varavu Nalla Uravu (1990)
1981	Thiagarajan	Alaigal Oivathillai	Malaiyoor Mambattiyan (1983), Neengal Kettavai (1984), Salem Vishnu (1990)
1981	Karthik	Alaigal Oivathillai	Agni Natchathiram (1988), Ponnumani (1993), Unnidathil Ennai Koduthen (1998)
1981	Suresh	Panneer Pushpangal	Manjal Nila (1982), Apoorva Sahodarigal (1983), Hello Yaar Pesurathu (1985)
1982	Prabhu	Sangili	Chinna Thambi (1992), Duet (1994), Chandramukhi (2005)
1982	Prem Menon	Krodham	Vetri Karangal (1991), Andha Naal (1996), Krodham 2 (2000)
1982	Raghuvaran	Ezhavathu Manithan	Puriyaadha Pudhir (1990), Baashha (1994), Mudhalvan (1999)
1983	Bhanu Chander	Silk Silk Silk	Neengal Kettavai (1984), Veedu (1988), Thimiru (2006)
1983	T. Rajendar	Thangaikkor Geetham	Mythili Ennai Kaathali (1986), Oru Thayin Sabhatham (1987), En Thangai Kalyani (1988)
1983	Anand Babu	Thangaikkor Geetham	Puriyaadha Pudhir (1990), Pudhu Vasantham (1990), Naan Pesa Ninaipathellam (1993)
1983	Pandiyan	Mann Vasanai	Pudhumai Penn (1984), Aan Paavam (1985), Kizhakku Cheemayile (1993)
1984	Arjun	Nandri	Gentleman (1993), Jai Hind (1994), Mudhalvan (1999)
1984	Murali	Poovilangu	Pagal Nilavu (1985), Pudhu Vasantham (1990), Idhayam (1991)
1985	Pandiarajan	Aan Paavam	Paatti Sollai Thattathe (1998), Gopala Gopala (1996), Anjathe (2008)
1985	Arun Pandian	Chidambara Rahasiyam	Oomai Vizhigal (1986), Inaindha Kaigal (1990), Devan (2002)
1986	Ramarajan	Namma Ooru Nalla Ooru	Enga Ooru Pattukaran (1987), Karagattakaran (1989), Amman Kovil Vaasalile (1996)
1986	Rahman	Nilave Malare	Pudhu Pudhu Arthangal (1989), Sangamam (1999), Dhuruvangal Pathinaaru (2016)
1986	Raja	Kadalora Kavithaigal	Pudhu Vasantham (1990), Captain Magal (1993), Karuththamma (1994)
1987	Ramesh Aravind	Manathil Uruthi Vendum	Keladi Kanmani (1990), Duet (1994), Panchathantiram (2002)
1987	Ramki	Chinna Poove Mella Pesu	Inaindha Kaigal (1990), Rajali (1996), Irattai Roja (1996)
1987	Nassar	Kavithai Paada Neramillai	Nayakan (1987), Avatharam (1995), Saivam (2014)
1987	Charan Raj	Neethikku Thandanai	Naan Sonnathey Sattam (1988), Adhu Antha Kaalam (1988), Gentleman (1993)
1987	Vivek	Manathil Uruthi Vendum	Kaadhal Mannan (1998), Run (2002), Brindavanam (2017)
1988	Sarathkumar	Kan Simittum Neram	Nattamai (1994), Surya Vamsam (1997), Muni 2: Kanchana (2011)
1988	Livingston	Poonthotta Kaavalkaaran	Sundara Purushan (1996), Sollamale (1998), En Purushan Kuzhandhai Maadhiri (2001)
1989	Rajkiran	Enne Petha Raasa	Aranmanai Kili (1993), Nandhaa (2001), Pa. Pandi (2017)
1989	Parthiban	Pudhiya Paadhai	Bharathi Kannamma (1997), Azhagi (2002), Naanum Rowdydhaan (2015)

== 1990s ==
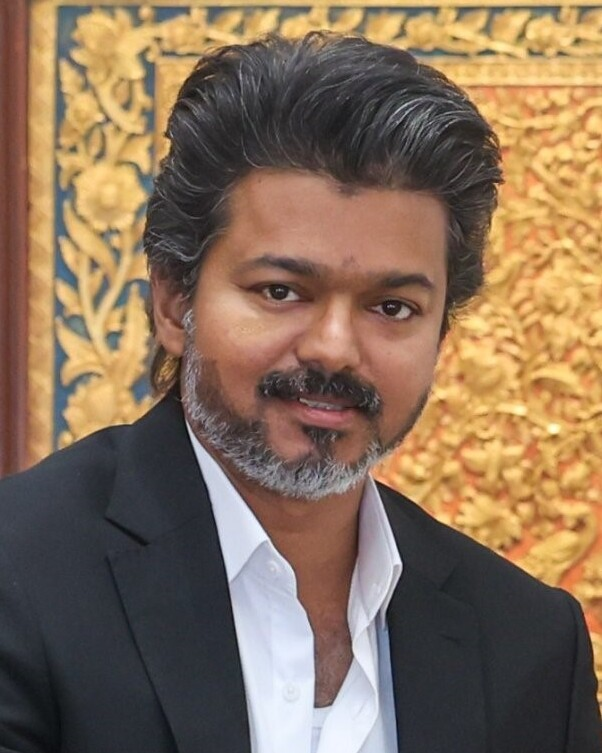
C. Joseph Vijay

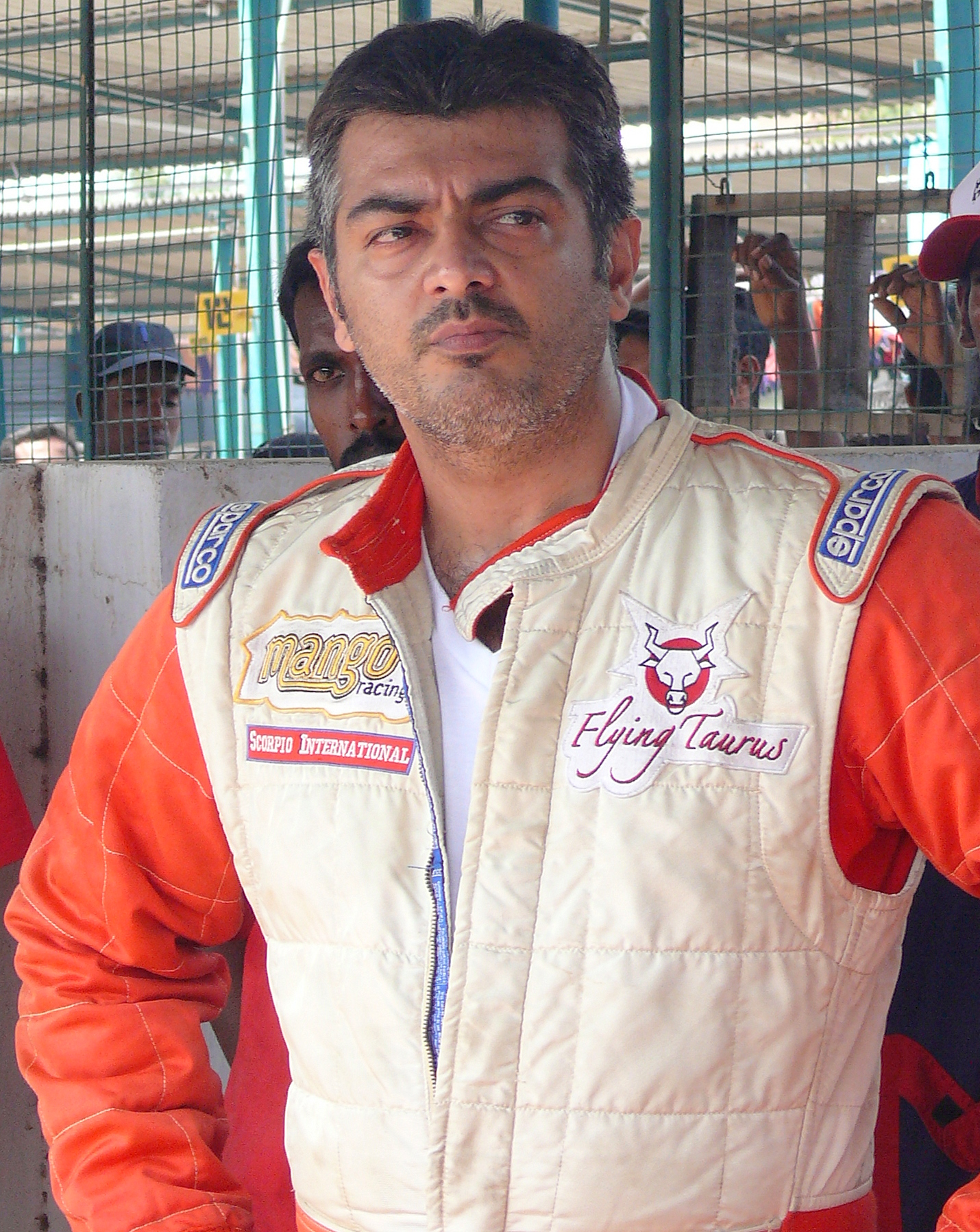
Ajith Kumar

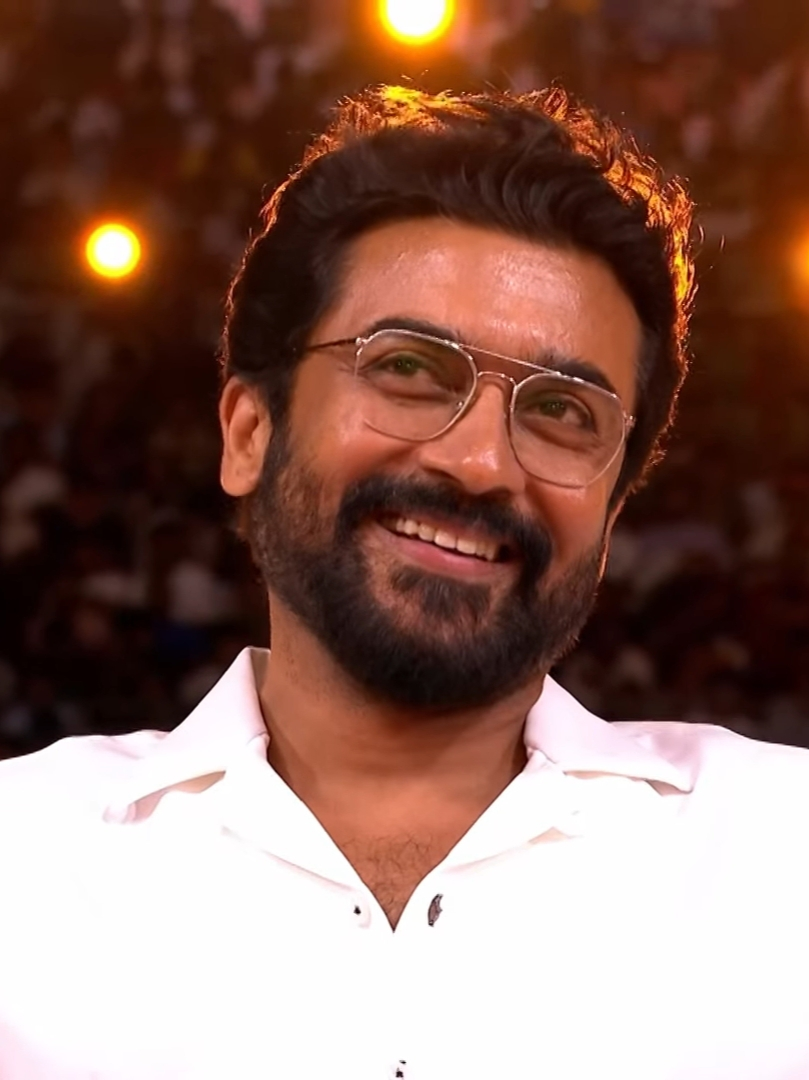
Suriya

Year	Name	Debut film	Other notable films
1990	Mammootty	Mounam Sammadham	Azhagan (1991), Thalapathi (1991), Kandukondain Kandukondain (2000)
1990	Anand	Nila Pennae	Thalaivasal (1992), Thiruda Thiruda (1993), Avathara Purushan (1996)
1990	Vignesh	Avanga Namma Ooru Ponnuga	Kizhakku Cheemayile (1993), Raman Abdullah (1997), Soori (2003)
1990	Vikram	En Kadhal Kanmani	Sethu (1999), Pithamagan (2003), Anniyan (2005)
1990	Prashanth	Vaigasi Poranthachu	Thiruda Thiruda (1993), Jeans (1998), Thamizh (2002), Winner (2003)
1991	Napoleon	Pudhu Nellu Pudhu Naathu	Seevalaperi Pandi (1994), Asuran (1995), Ettupatti Rasa (1997)
1991	Selva	Aatha Un Koyilile	Sakthivel (1994), Nattupura Pattu (1996), Golmaal (1998)
1991	Vadivelu	En Rasavin Manasile	Kaadhalan (1994), Winner (2003), Imsai Arasan 23rd Pulikecei (2006)
1991	Arvind Swamy	Thalapathi	Roja (1992), Bombay (1994), Thani Oruvan (2015),
1992	Saravanan	Pondatti Rajyam	Nallathe Nadakkum (1993), Thaai Manasu (1994), Paruthiveeran (2007)
1992	C. Joseph Vijay	Naalaiya Theerpu	Poove Unakkaga (1996), Thulladha Manamum Thullum (1999), Ghilli (2004), Pokkiri (2007), Thuppaki (2012), Master (2021), Leo (2023)
1992	Vineeth	Aavarampoo	May Madham (1994), Kadhal Desam (1996), Chandramukhi (2005)
1993	Suresh Menon	Pudhiya Mugam	Thaanaa Serndha Koottam (2018), Kaalidas (2019), Koogle Kuttappa (2022)
1993	Jayaram	Gokulam	Murai Maman (1995), Thenali (2000), Julie Ganapathi (2003)
1993	Ranjith	Pon Vilangu	Sindhu Nathi Poo (1994), Maru Malarchi (1998), Bheeshmar (2003)
1993	Ajith Kumar	Amaravathi	Aasai (1995), Kadhal Kottai (1996), Vaalee (1999), Varalaru (2006), Mankatha (2011)
1994	Prakash Raj	Duet	Iruvar (1997), Ghilli (2004), Kanchivaram (2009)
1994	Prabhu Deva	Indhu	Kaadhalan (1994), Minsara Kanavu (1997), Ullam Kollai Poguthae (2001)
1994	Karan	Nammavar	Raman Abdullah (1997), Color Kanavugal (1998), Kokki (2006)
1995	Arun Vijay	Murai Mappillai	Pandavar Bhoomi (2001), Thadaiyara Thaakka (2012), Yennai Arindhaal (2015)
1995	Jackie Shroff	Rangeela	Bigil (2019)
1995	Aamir Khan	Rangeela	Coolie (2025)
1996	Abbas	Kadhal Desam	V.I.P. (1997), Kandukondain Kandukondain (2000), Aanandham (2001)
1997	Suriya	Nerukku Ner	Kaakha Kaakha (2003), Ghajini (2005), Vaaranam Aayiram (2008)
1997	Mohanlal	Iruvar	Pop Corn (2003), Jilla (2014), Kaappan (2019)
1999	Kunal	Kadhalar Dhinam	Paarvai Ondre Podhume (2001), Punnagai Desam (2002), Super Da (2004)
1999	Manoj Bharathiraja	Taj Mahal	Samudhiram (2001), Alli Arjuna (2002), Annakodi (2013)
1999	Hamsavardhan	Maanaseega Kadhal	Vadagupatti Maapillai (2001), Junior Senior (2002), Manthiran (2005)
1999	Jai Akash	Rojavanam	Roja Kootam (2002), Inidhu Inidhu Kadhal Inidhu (2003), Amudhae (2005)

== 2000s ==
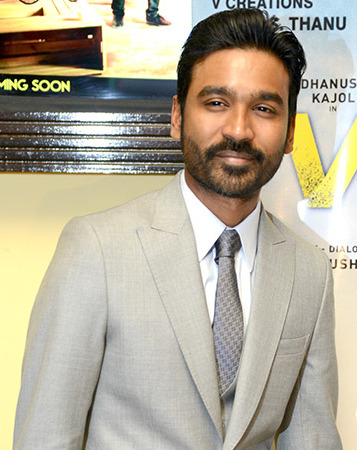
Dhanush

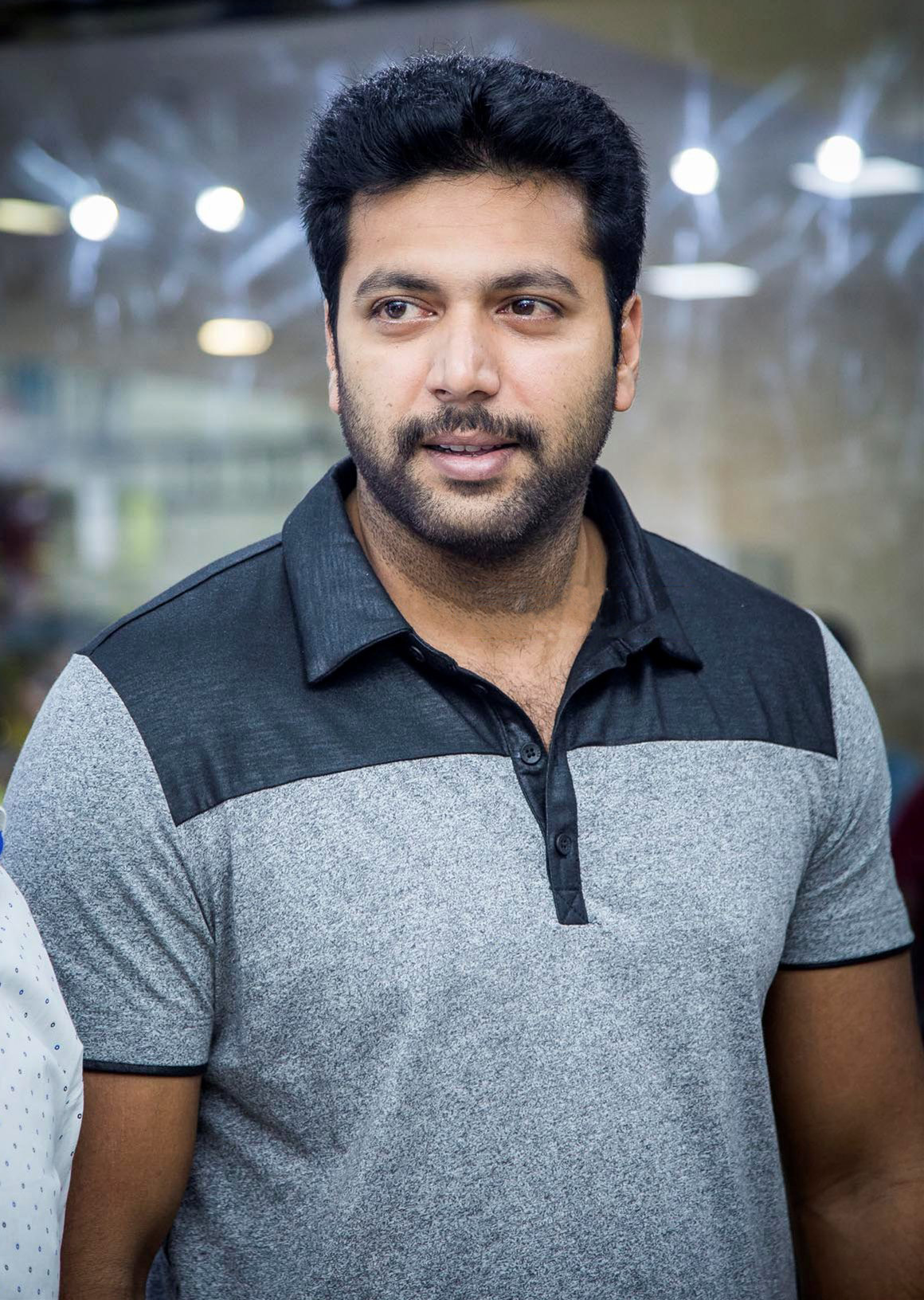
Jayam ravi

Year	Name	Debut film	Other notable films
2000	Madhavan	Alaipayuthey	Minnale (2001), Kannathil Muthamittal (2002), Irudhi Suttru (2016)
2000	Shah Rukh Khan	Hey Ram	Jawan (2023)
2000	Dino Morea	Kandukondain Kandukondain	Solo (2017), Agent (2023)
2001	Raghava Lawrence	Parthale Paravasam	Muni (2007), Muni 2: Kanchana (2011), Kanchana 2 (2015)
2001	Shaam	12B	Lesa Lesa (2003), Iyarkai (2003), Ullam Ketkumae (2005), Varisu (2023)
2001	Suniel Shetty	12B	Darbar (2020)
2002	Dhanush	Thulluvadho Ilamai	Aadukalam (2011), Velaiilla Pattadhari (2014), Asuran (2019)
2002	Jeevan	University	Kaaka Kaaka (2003), Thiruttu Payale (2006), Naan Avanillai (2007)
2002	Prasanna	Five Star	Azhagiya Theeye (2004), Kanda Naal Mudhal (2005), Kalyana Samayal Saadham (2013)
2002	Cheran	Solla Marandha Kadhai	Autograph (2004), Thavamai Thavamirundhu (2005), Yuddham Sei (2011)
2002	Silambarasan	Kadhal Azhivathillai	Manmadhan (2004), Vallavan (2006), Vinnaithaandi Varuvaayaa (2011)
2002	Srikanth	Roja Kootam	Parthiban Kanavu (2003), Kana Kandaen (2005), Nanban (2012)
2002	Nandha	Mounam Pesiyadhe	Eeram (2009), Anandhapurathu Veedu (2010), Vellore Maavattam (2011)
2002	Richard	Kadhal Virus	Naalai (2006), Pen Singam (2010), Ninaithathu Yaaro (2014)
2002	Ramana	Style	Meesai Madhavan (2005), Ajantha (2009), Meaghamann (2014)
2003	Jiiva	Aasai Aasaiyai	Raam (2005), Kattradhu Thamizh (2007), Ko (2011)
2003	Sibi Sathyaraj	Student Number 1	Lee (2007), Naaigal Jaakirathai (2014), Sathya (2017)
2003	Jayam Ravi	Jayam	M. Kumaran Son of Mahalakshmi (2004), Peraanmai (2009), Thani Oruvan (2015)
2003	Siddharth	Boys	Aaytha Ezhuthu (2004), Kadhalil Sodhappuvadhu Yeppadi (2012), Kaaviya Thalaivan (2014)
2003	Bharath	Boys	Kaadhal (2004), Em Magan (2006), Veyyil (2006)
2003	Thaman S	Boys	
2003	Manikandan	Boys	Maharaja (2024)
2003	Nakul	Boys	Kadhalil Vizhunthen (2008), Maasilamani (2009), Tamiluku En Ondrai Aluthavum (2015)
2004	S. J. Suryah	New	Isai (2015), Mersal (2017), Monster (2019)
2004	Vishal	Chellamae	Sandakozhi (2005), Avan Ivan (2011), Thupparivaalan (2017)
2004	Karthik Kumar	Vaanam Vasappadum	Kanda Naal Mudhal (2005), Poi Solla Porom (2008), Pasanga 2 (2015)
2004	Ravi Krishna	7G Rainbow Colony	Sukran (2005), Kedi (2006), Aaranya Kaandam (2011)
2004	Santhanam	Manmadhan	Arai En 305-il Kadavul (2008), Boss Engira Bhaskaran (2010), Kanna Laddu Thinna Aasaiya (2013)
2005	Jithan Ramesh	Jithan	Jerry (2006), Madurai Veeran (2007), Osthe (2012)
2005	Vikranth	Karka Kasadara	Pandianadu (2013), Thakka Thakka (2015), Thondan (2017)
2005	Prithviraj	Kana Kandaen	Mozhi (2007), Raavanan (2010), Kaaviya Thalaivan (2014)
2005	Navdeep	Arinthum Ariyamalum	Nenjil Jil Jil (2006), A Aa E Ee (2009), Solla Solla Inikkum (2009)
2005	Arya	Arinthum Ariyamalum	Naan Kadavul (2009), Boss Engira Bhaskaran (2010), Sarpatta Parambarai (2021)
2006	Narain	Chithiram Pesuthadi	Pallikoodam (2007), Anjathe (2008), Mugamoodi (2012)
2006	Natty	Naalai	Muthukku Muthaaga (2011), Sathuranga Vettai (2014), Richie (2017)
2006	Sundar C	Thalai Nagaram	Veerappu (2007), Sandai (2008), Aranmanai (2014)
2006	Vishnu Priyan	Ilakkanam	Kadhal Meipada (2011), Arya Surya (2013), Angali Pangali (2016)
2006	Siddharth Venugopal	June R	Ananda Thandavam (2009), Naan (2012)
2007	Ashok Kumar	Muruga	Pidichirukku (2008), Kadhal Solla Aasai (2014), Gangs of Madras (2018)
2007	Karthi	Paruthiveeran	Paiyaa (2010), Madras (2014), Theeran Adhigaaram Ondru (2017)
2007	Vinay	Unnale Unnale	Jayamkondaan (2008), Aranmanai (2014), Doctor (2021)
2007	Jai	Chennai 600028	Subramaniapuram (2008), Engaeyum Eppothum (2011), Raja Rani (2013)
2007	Shiva	Chennai 600028	Tamizh Padam (2010), Kalakalappu (2012), Vanakkam Chennai (2013)
2007	Vijay Vasanth	Chennai 600028	Naadodigal (2009), Ennamo Nadakkudhu (2014), Chennai 600028 II (2016)
2007	Shakthi Vasudevan	Thottal Poo Malarum	Mahesh, Saranya Matrum Palar (2008), Ninaithale Inikkum (2009), Shivalinga (2017)
2007	Kishore	Polladhavan	Aadukalam (2011), Haridas (2013), Visaranai (2016)
2007	Aadhi	Mirugam	Eeram (2009), Aravaan (2012), Maragadha Naanayam (2017)
2007	Naveen Chandra	Pazhaniappa Kalloori	Koottam (2014), Sarabham (2014), Sivappu (2015)
2008	Ajmal Ameer	Anjathe	TN 07 AL 4777 (2009), Ko (2011), Karuppampatti (2013)
2008	Sathya	Valluvan Vasuki	Sirithal Rasipen (2009), Nellu (2010), Maharaja (2011)
2008	Samuthirakani	Subramaniapuram	Visaranai (2016), Appa (2016), Thondan (2017)
2008	Sasikumar	Subramaniapuram	Naadodigal (2009), Sundarapandian (2012), Tharai Thappattai (2016)
2008	Vaibhav	Saroja	Mankatha (2011), Kappal (2014), Meyaadha Maan (2017)
2008	Kreshna	Alibhabha	Kazhugu (2012), Yaamirukka Bayamey (2014), Pandigai (2017)
2008	Shanthanu Bhagyaraj	Sakkarakatti	Siddu +2 (2010), Kandaen (2011), Koditta Idangalai Nirappuga (2017)
2008	Ganesh Venkatraman	Abhiyum Naanum	Unnaipol Oruvan (2009), Theeya Velai Seiyyanum Kumaru (2013), Thani Oruvan (2015)
2009	Sharwanand	Kadhalna Summa Illai	Engeyum Eppodhum (2011), JK Enum Nanbanin Vaazhkai (2015), Kanam (2022)
2009	Vishnu Vishal	Vennila Kabadi Kuzhu	Neerparavai (2012), Jeeva (2014), Indru Netru Naalai (2015), Ratsasan (2018)
2009	Soori	Vennila Kabadi Kuzhu	Viduthalai Part 1 (2023), Garudan (2024), Maaman (2025)
2009	Vimal	Pasanga	Kalavani (2010), Kalakalappu (2012), Manjapai (2014)

== 2010s ==
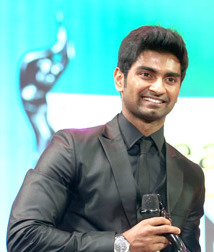
Atharvaa

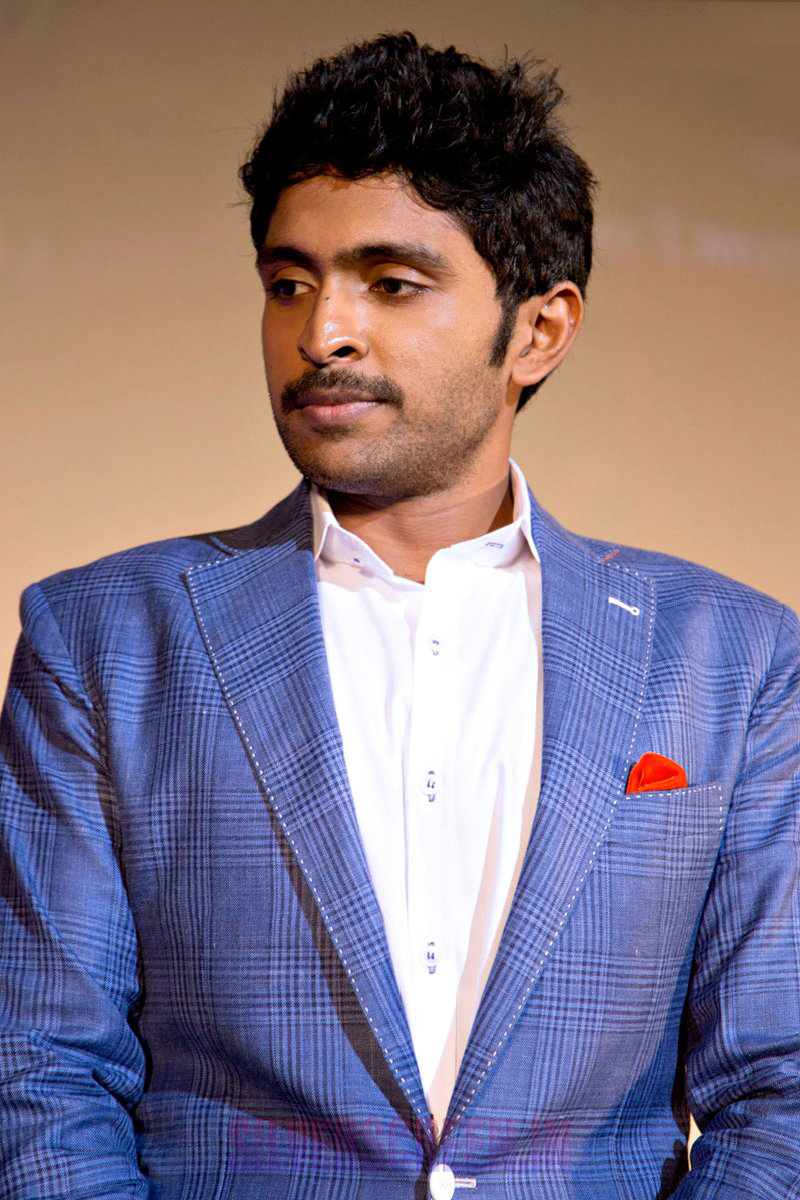
Vikram Prabhu

Year	Name	Debut film	Other notable films
2010	Aari	Rettaisuzhi	Maalai Pozhudhin Mayakathilaey (2012), Nedunchaalai (2014), Maya (2015)
2010	Mahesh	Angadi Theru	Yasakhan (2014), Buddhanin Sirippu (2015), Vattakara (2022)
2010	Atharvaa	Baana Kaathadi	Muppozhudhum Un Karpanaigal (2012), Paradesi (2013), Kanithan (2016)
2010	Rahul Ravindran	Moscowin Kavery	Vinmeengal (2012), Vanakkam Chennai (2013), U Turn (2018)
2010	Arulnithi	Vamsam	Mouna Guru (2011), Demonte Colony (2015), Brindavanam (2017)
2010	Harish Kalyan	Sindhu Samaveli	Poriyaalan (2014), Pyaar Prema Kaadhal (2017), Dharala Prabhu (2020)
2010	Vidharth	Thottupaar	Mynaa (2010), Kuttrame Thandanai (2016), Kurangu Bommai (2017)
2010	Sathish	Thamizh Padam	Naai Sekar (2022), Conjuring Kannappan (2023), Sattam En Kaiyil (2024)
2010	Rathan Mouli	Unnaiye Kadhalipen	13 aam Pakkam Parkka (2015), Vellikizhamai 13am Thethi (2016), Arasakulam (2017)
2010	Vijay Sethupathi	Thenmerku Paruvakaatru	Pizza (2012), Naanum Rowdy Dhaan (2015), Vikram Vedha (2017),Vikram (2022),Jawan (2023)
2011	Ashwin Kakumanu	Nadunisi Naaygal	Mankatha (2011), Idharkuthane Aasaipattai Balakumara (2013), Zero (2016)
2011	Galaxy Star Vimal	Koothi Nakkal	Kolamavu Kokila (2018), Mandela (2021), Bommai Nayagi (2023)
2012	Sivakarthikeyan	Marina	Ethir Neechal (2013), Varuthapadatha Valibar Sangam (2013), Remo (2016),Doctor (2021),Ayalaan (2024)
2012	Vivek Rajgopal	Naanga	Oru Modhal Oru Kadhal (2014), Echcharikkai (2018), Jasper (2022)
2012	Karunakaran	Kalakalappu	Soodhu Kavvum (2013), Yaamirukka Bayamey (2014), Uppu Karuvaadu (2015)
2012	Sri	Vazhakku Enn 18/9	Onaayum Aatukuttiyum (2013), Vil Ambu (2016), Maanagaram (2017)
2012	Udhayanidhi Stalin	Oru Kal Oru Kannadi	Idhu Kathirvelan Kadhal (2014), Nannbenda (2015), Manithan (2016)
2012	Dinesh	Attakathi	Cuckoo (2014), Thirudan Police (2014), Visaranai (2016)
2012	Vijay Antony	Naan	Salim (2014), Pichaikkaran (2016), Yaman (2017)
2012	Vikram Prabhu	Kumki	Ivan Veramathiri (2013), Arima Nambi (2014), Sigaram Thodu (2014)
2012	Arjun Das	Perumaan	Andhaghaaram (2020), Aneethi (2023), Rasavathi (2024)
2013	Gautham Karthik	Kadal	Vai Raja Vai (2015), Rangoon (2017), Hara Hara Mahadevaki (2017)
2013	Nivin Pauly	Neram	Richie (2017)
2013	Ashok Selvan	Soodhu Kavvum	Pizza 2: The Villa (2013), Thegidi (2014), Kootathil Oruthan (2017)
2013	Bobby Simha	Soodhu Kavvum	Jigarthanda (2014), Ko 2 (2016), Iraivi (2016)
2013	Sundeep Kishan	Yaaruda Mahesh	Maanagaram (2017), Nenjil Thunivirundhal (2017), Maayavan (2017)
2013	RJ Balaji	Theeya Velai Seiyyanum Kumaru	LKG (2019), Mookuthi Amman (2020), Veetla Vishesham (2022)
2013	Rana Daggubati	Arrambam	Baahubali: The Beginning (2015), Bangalore Naatkal (2016), Kaadan (2021)
2013	Kathir	Madha Yaanai Koottam	Vikram Vedha (2017), Pariyerum Perumal (2018), Bigil (2019)
2014	Dulquer Salmaan	Vaayai Moodi Pesavum	O Kadhal Kanmani (2015), Kannum Kannum Kollaiyadithaal (2020), Hey Sinamika (2022)
2014	Santhosh Prathap	Kathai Thiraikathai Vasanam Iyakkam	Dhayam (2017), Pancharaaksharam (2019), Sarpatta Parambarai (2021)
2014	Kalaiyarasan	Madras	Kabali (2016), Adhe Kangal (2017), Jagame Thandhiram (2021)
2015	G. V. Prakash Kumar	Darling	Trisha Illana Nayanthara (2015), Pencil (2016), Sarvam Thaala Mayam (2019)
2015	Dhruvva	Thilagar	Kadhal Kasakuthaiya (2017), Marainthirunthu Paarkum Marmam Enna (2018), Devadas Brothers (2021)
2015	Linga	Chennai Ungalai Anbudan Varaverkirathu	Penguin (2020), Parole (2022), Udanpaal (2022)
2015	K. Manikandan	India Pakistan	Good Night (2023), Lover (2024), Kudumbasthan (2025)
2016	R. K. Suresh	Tharai Thappattai	Billa Pandi (2018), Vettai Naai (2021), Visithiran (2022)
2016	Gokul Anand	Maalai Nerathu Mayakkam	Chennai 2 Singapore (2017), Pancharaaksharam (2019), Theeviram (2020)
2016	R. S. Karthiik	Achcham Yenbadhu Madamaiyada	Peechankai (2017), Yennanga Sir Unga Sattam (2021), Parole
2016	Kalidas Jayaram	Meen Kuzhambum Mann Paanaiyum	Putham Pudhu Kaalai (2020), Oru Pakka Kathai (2020), Natchathiram Nagargiradhu (2022)
2016	Vijay Kumar	Uriyadi	Uriyadi 2 (2019), Fight Club (2023), Election (2024)
2017	Vetri	8 Thottakkal	Jiivi (2019), C/O Kaadhal (2021), Jiivi 2 (2022)
2017	Hiphop Tamizha Adhi	Meesaya Murukku	Natpe Thunai (2019), Naan Sirithal (2020), Anbarivu (2022)
2017	Vasanth Ravi	Taramani	Rocky (2021), Jailer (2023)
2017	Kishen Das	Mudhal Nee Mudivum Nee	Sync (2023), Tharunam (2025)
2017	2018	Akshay Kumar	2.0
2019	Dhruv Vikram	Adithya Varma	Varmaa (2020), Mahaan (2022), Bison Kaalamaadan (2025)
2019	Teejay	Asuran	Thatrom Thookrom (2020), Pathu Thala (2023), Bad Girl (2025), Jana Nayagan (2026)

== 2020's ==
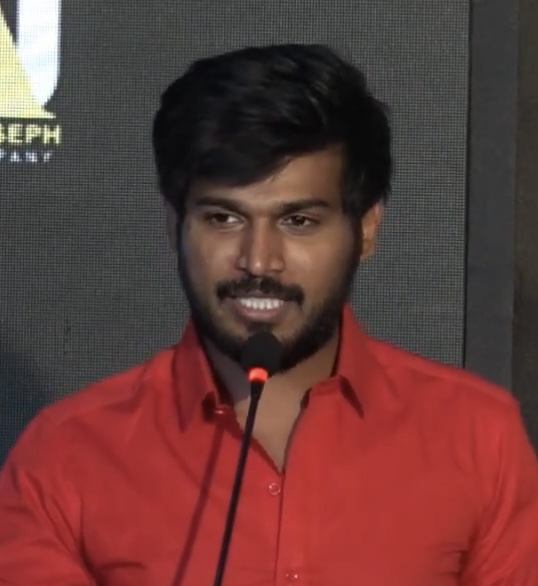
VJ Rakshan

Year	Name	Debut film	Other notable films
2020	VJ Rakshan	Kannum Kannum Kollaiyadithaal	
2020	Sikkil Gurucharan	Putham Pudhu Kaalai	
2021	Subhash Selvam	Thittam Irandu	
2021	Rohit Saraf	Kamali from Nadukkaveri	Thug Life (2025)
2021	Kavin	Lift	Dada (2023), Star (2024)
2022	Sarjano Khalid	Cobra	
2022	Roshan Mathew	Cobra	
2022	Irfan Pathan	Cobra	
2022	Pradeep Ranganathan	Love Today	Dragon (2025), Dude (2025)
2023	Ken Karunas	Vaathi	Viduthalai Part 1 (2024), Youth (2026)
2023	Mathew Thomas	Leo	Nilavuku En Mel Ennadi Kobam (2025)
2023	Sanjay Dutt	Leo	
2024	Bobby Deol	Kanguva	Jana Nayagan (2026)
2025	Pavish Narayanan	Nilavuku En Mel Ennadi Kobam	
2025	Abishan Jeevinth	Tourist Family	With Love (2026)
2025	Karthikeya Dev	Good Bad Ugly	
2026	Mohnish	Oththa Roova	
