= Soan Papdi (film) =

2015 Indian film by Sivani

- சோன்பப்டி
- Directed by: Sivani
- Written by: Sivani
- Story by: S Kalaivani
- Produced by: S Kalaivani
- Starring: Sri; Sahil Kirpalani; Priya Atlee; Niranjana
- Cinematography: Thanu Balaji
- Edited by: K Thanigachalam
- Music by: Dhanraj Manickam
- Production company: Golden Movie Maker
- Release date: 29 May 2015
- Running time: 120 minutes
- Country: India
- Language: Tamil

Soan Papdi (Tamil: சோன்பப்டி) is a 2015 Tamil language comedy crime thriller film directed by Sivani. The film features Sri, child actor Sahil Kirpalani (making his debut), Priya Atlee, and Niranjana in lead roles, while Manobala and Pattimandram Raja play supporting roles. The music was composed by Dhanraj Manickam. The film released on 29 May 2015.

== Plot ==
The story is about an engineer who lands in a mysterious quandary and how he begins to unravel the mystery around it.

== Cast ==
- Sri as Shiva
- Sahil Kirpalani as Sahil
- Priya Atlee as Aarthy
- Niranjana
- Balaji K. Mohan as Shiva's friend
- Manobala as Shiva's boss
- Pattimandram Raja
- Besant Ravi
- Karate Raja as Police officer
- Sonia

== Soundtrack ==
Soan Papdi

Soundtrack album by Dhanraj Manickam
- Genre: Feature Film Soundtrack
- Language: Tamil
- Label: Divo

The soundtrack album for Soan Papdi was composed by Dhanraj Manickam. The lyrics penned by Na. Muthukumar, Annamalai, and S. Kalaivani.

Tracklist
No.	Title	Lyrics	Singer(s)	Length
1.	"Enga Kaattula Mazhai"	S Kalaivani	Sooraj Santhosh	04:35
2.	"I Am Very Sorry"	Annamalai	Dhanraj Manickam	05:16
3.	"Sonu Papdi"	Annamalai	Gaana Bala, Sivani	03:43
4.	"Hey Chocolates"	Na. Muthukumar	Padmalatha	04:45
Total length:				18:19

== Release ==
The Times of India gave the film a rating of one-half out of five stars and wrote that "This might seem like a decent plot on paper, but an air of amateurishness pervades Soan Papdi that it is hard for us to not mind the poor writing or the ineffectual filmmaking." A critic from The New Indian Express felt that the film was better skipped.
