= Linga (actor) =

Indian actor

- Born: Chennai, Tamil Nadu
- Occupation: Actor
- Years active: 2015–present

Linga is an Indian actor who has appeared in Tamil language films. After making his film debut in the Tamil film Chennai Ungalai Anbudan Varaverkirathu (2015), he has been in films including Sindhubaadh (2019), Parole (2022) and Udanpaal (2022).

== Career ==
Linga's first major role came in Arun Kumar's Sethupathi (2016), where he portrayed a police officer supporting Vijay Sethupathi's character in his investigation. Linga portrayed the main antagonist in Arun Kumar's Sindhubaadh (2019), appearing as Bangkok-based gangster in the human trafficking business. The film opened to mixed reviews, with a critic from Firstpost noting that his character was "underwritten".

Linga portrayed a pivotal role in Penguin (2020), appearing as the lead actress Keerthy Suresh's husband. In 2022, Linga played a lead role, alongside R. S. Karthik, in Dwarakh Raja's crime thriller Parole. He also featured in the lead role in Udanpaal, headlining an ensemble cast of actors such as Charle, Gayathrie and Vivek Prasanna.

== Filmography ==
List of Linga film credits
Year	Film	Role	Notes
2015	Chennai Ungalai Anbudan Varaverkirathu	Karthik	
2016	Sethupathi	Shenbaga Moorthy	
2017	Adhe Kangal	Thomas	
2017	Kadhal Kasakuthaiya	Vivek	
2017	Hara Hara Mahadevaki	Kidnapper	
2017	Karuppan		
2018	Ghajinikanth	Police officer	
2019	Sindhubaadh	Ling	
2019	Miga Miga Avasaram	Samandhi's uncle	
2019	V1	Siddharthan	
2020	Penguin	Raghu	
2020	Thatrom Thookrom	Inspector Sekar	
2021	Annabelle Sethupathi	Kathir	
2021	Gaadi Ulla Body		
2022	Parole	Karikalan	
2022	DSP	Chandru	
2022	Udanpaal	Paraman	
2023	Pallu Padama Paathuka	Parthasarathy	
2025	Blackmail	Arun	

=== Television series ===
- Ayali (2023)
- Story of Things (2023)
- Iru Dhuruvam 2 (2023)
