= Angel Glady =

Indian actress

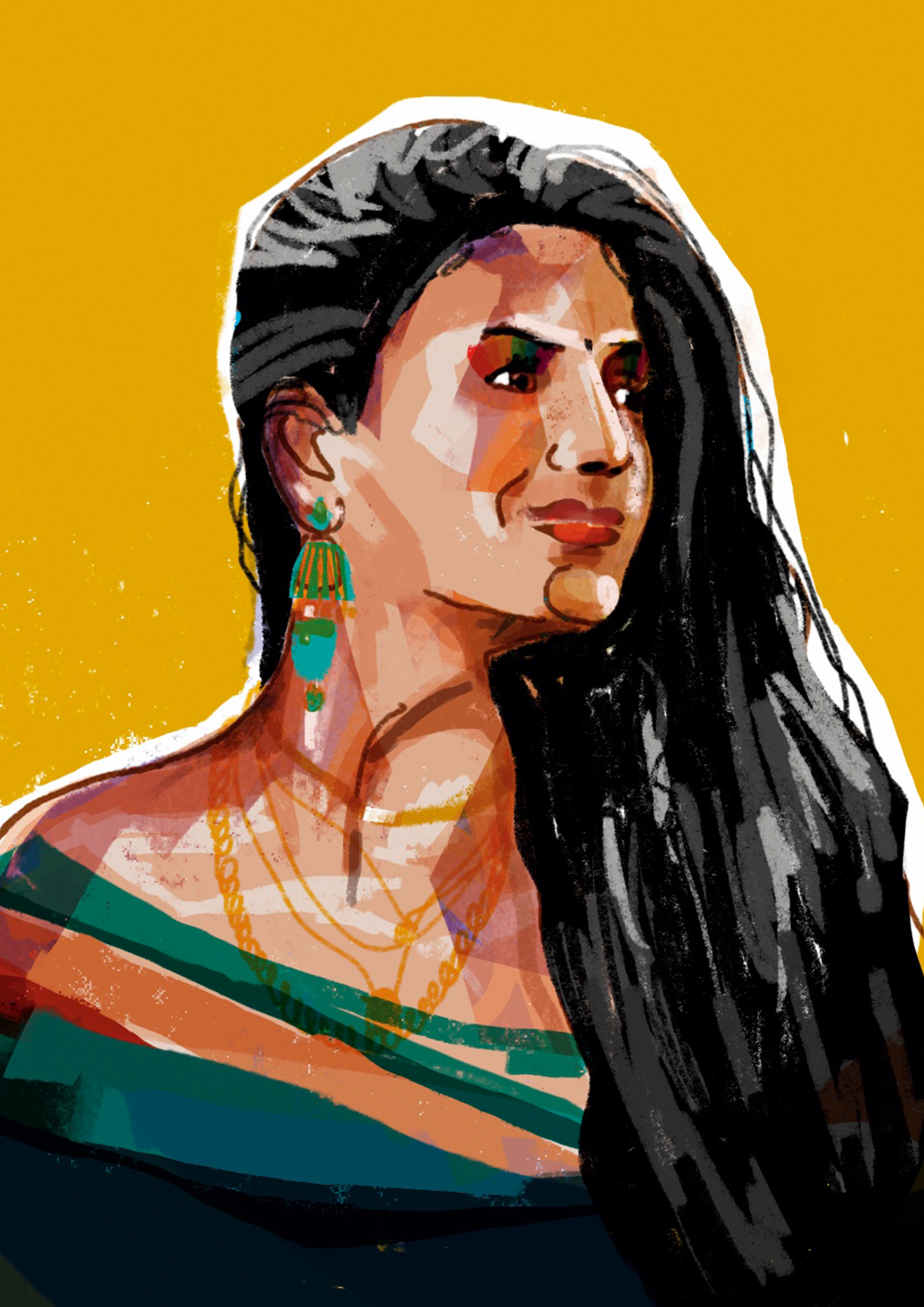
- A portrait of Glady
- Born: February 5, 1986 (age 40)
- Occupations: Actor, Writer, Theatre Artist, Transgender Rights Activist

Angel Glady is an Indian activist, educator, and theatre artist from Tamil Nadu, where she was born and raised. She is best known for her advocacy work in the LGBTQ+ community and her contributions to the arts, particularly through theatre. She made history by becoming the first trans woman to pursue a master's degree in Mass Communication from the University of Madras.

== Career ==
=== Theatre ===
Angel Glady is an independent trans artist collective based in Chennai.

=== Filmography ===
Angel Galdy is an actress known for her roles in the films Onaayum Aattukkuttiyum and Vallavanukkum Valavan. She also starred in Leena Manimekalai's 2017 film "Is it Too Much to Ask?", where she plays a trans woman seeking housing in Chennai but facing discrimination. The film, a mix of fiction and documentary, was based in part on her own extensive experiences with housing discrimination.

== Activism ==
Angel Glady is an advocate for trans rights and inclusivity, local and international.

Angel is Co-founding Panmai Theatre, which is significant for being one of the first trans artist movements in Tamil Nadu.
