= Aaryamala =

2024 Tamil film

- Theatrical release poster
- Directed by: James Yuvan
- Written by: James Yuvan
- Produced by: Vadalur Sudha Rajalakshmi
- Starring: R. S. Karthiik; Manisha Jith; Durga; G. Marimuthu
- Cinematography: Jaishankar Ramalingam
- Edited by: Hariharan
- Music by: Selvanambi
- Production companies: Jana Joy Movies; Cable Sankar Entertainment; SPR Cinemas
- Release date: 18 October 2024
- Running time: 117 minutes
- Country: India
- Language: Tamil

Aaryamala is a 2024 Indian Tamil-language period drama film written and directed by James Yuvan in his debut, starring R. S. Karthiik and Manisha Jith. Aaryamala released in theatres on 18 October 2024.

== Premise ==
Set in 1982, Malar's younger step-sister Kayal attains puberty before Malar, making the latter face embarrassment from the villagers and relatives. Ilango, a Therukoothu artist, visits the village for a performance, and Malar is smitten, believing him to be her dreamboy. As they fall in love, the rest of the story unfolds around Malar's journey - will she unite with Ilango, how will she navigate her delayed puberty, and what challenges will she face in overcoming societal pressure?

== Cast ==
- R. S. Karthiik as Ilango
- Manisha Jith as Malar
- G. Marimuthu
- Durga as Kayal, Malar's step-sister
- Elizabeth Suraj as Gomathi, Malar's step-mother
- Thavasi
- James Yuvan

== Music ==
External audio
- Aariyamala Jukebox on YouTube

All lyrics are written by Aadhirai; all music is composed by Selvanambi.

Track listing
No.	Title	Singer(s)	Length
1.	"Aththi Poova Pola"	Bhavatharini
2.	"Mannula Porantha"	Selvanambi
3.	"Ennoda Aattaththa"	Jay Moorthy, Anitha Karthik
4.	"Aasa Aasa"	Jeshika Helen

== Release and reception ==
Aaryamala was released in theatres on 18 October 2024. Akshay Kumar of Cinema Express gave 2/5 stars and wrote "The film plays safe, risking going against its own interests by sidestepping from calling a spade a spade and ascribing some other intentions to the murders.[...] The only consolation with Aariyamala is the experience of folklore unfolding in front of our eyes and the story of our ancestors getting retold." Thinkal Menon of The Times of India gave 2/5 stars and wrote, "The female-centric story is dealt with sensitively; the various struggles the protagonist undergoes are showcased compellingly.[...] The dearth of engrossing episodes sticks out like a sore thumb. This deters the film's prospects of offering a captivating emotional drama that is supposed to leave us affected." Maalai Malar gave 2/5 stars, praising the performances of the lead cast, music and cinematography, while strongly criticizing the irrelatable plot, screenplay and the second half of the film that majorly relied on depicting the street-play alone. Malini Mannath praised the performances of the lead actor and the director for sensibly handling an unusual premise in his debut film.
