= Usurae =

- Theatrical release poster
- Directed by: Naveen D Gopal
- Written by: Naveen D Gopal
- Produced by: Mouli M Radha Krishna
- Starring: Teejay Arunasalam; Janany Kunaseelan
- Cinematography: Mukunthan Seevarathinam (Marcki Sai)
- Edited by: Mani Maran
- Music by: Kiran Joze
- Production companies: Shree Krishna Productions; Bakialakshmi Talkies
- Release date: 1 August 2025
- Country: India
- Language: Tamil

Usurae is a 2025 Indian Tamil-language romantic drama film written and directed by Naveen D Gopal, starring Teejay Arunasalam and Janany Kunaseelan. It was released on 1 August 2025.

== Plot ==
Raghava, with his gentle nature and humble demeanor, forms a beautiful contrast to the lively and spirited Ranjana. Together, they make a couple that is both endearing and believable, making their romance deeply relatable.

Adding intensity to the story is Anusuya, Ranjana's strong-willed and fiercely protective mother. Her presence brings a powerful emotional dynamic to the narrative. As a formidable figure, Anusuya challenges Raghava at every turn, becoming the key obstacle in his path. Yet, it is this very challenge that deepens the story and elevates Raghava's journey.

== Cast ==
- Teejay Arunasalam as Raghava
- Janany Kunaseelan as Ranjana
- Thangadurai as Raghava's friend
- Manthra as Anasuya
- Senthi Kumari as Raghava's mother
- Pavel Navageethan as Latchee
- Crane Manohar as Raghava's father
- Adithya Kathir as Raghava's friend
- Melvin Jayaprakash as Raghava's friend

== Soundtrack ==
The music was composed by Kiran Joze with lyrics by G. Lal.

Track listing
No.	Title	Singer(s)	Length
1.	"Kaanamale"	K. S. Chithra	4:27
2.	"Kaanatha Kanave"	Sathyaprakash D, Chinmayi Sripada	4:17
3.	"Nee En Ulagame"	Sreekanth Hariharan, Chinmayi Sripada	3:22
4.	"Usurea Usurae"	Kapil Kapilan	3:40
5.	"Vanthu Parunga"	Senthil Ganesh	3:00
Total length:			18:46

== Reception ==
Narayani M of Cinema Express rated the film 2/5 and wrote, "It is in its final moments that Usurae finally breathes, after a few unique punches to the gut. But with the emotional dissonance, accompanied by a heavy dose of melodrama, become complete misfits to the story". A critic from Maalai Malar rated the film 2.5/5 and wrote that Naveen D Gopal has directed the film with a simple love story as its centerpiece, but the last 10 minutes of the film make it difficult for the audience to watch the entire film just to see the unexpected twist. A critic from Dinamalar gave the film the same rating and wrote that the film only has life in its climax.
