= Yennanga Sir Unga Sattam =

2021 Indian film

- Film poster
- Directed by: Prabhu Jeyaram
- Produced by: Sudhan Sundaram; G. Jayaram
- Starring: R. S. Karthiik; Ayra
- Cinematography: Arunkrishna Radhakrishnan
- Edited by: Prakash Karunanithi
- Music by: Guna Balasubramanian
- Production company: Passion Studios
- Distributed by: SonyLIV
- Release date: 29 October 2021
- Country: India
- Language: Tamil

Yennanga Sir Unga Sattam (transl. What Is Your Law, Sir?) is a 2021 Indian Tamil-language drama film directed by Prabhu Jeyaram and starring R. S. Karthiik and Ayra. Produced by Passion Studios, it was released on SonyLIV 29 October 2021.

== Cast ==
- R. S. Karthiik as JP
- Ayraa
- Soundarya Bala Nandakumar
- Junior Balaiah
- Rohini
- Bagavathi Perumal as a producer
- Vikas as Jeyram
- Vijayan as Naren
- Meera Mithun as Varsha

== Production ==
The film's debutant director Prabhu Jeyaram stated that he tried to talk about the issues in the caste-based society from a neutral perspective. The film was made in a new format, known as a 'duplex movie', meaning the first half and the second half are two different films. Actors were seen playing different characters in the second half, but the two stories will come together in the end. The director linked the format to K. Balachander's Oru Veedu Iru Vaasal (1990).

The film is about the trained archakas of all castes, and released at a time when the Tamil Nadu government had appointed 24 trained archakas of all castes at the Hindu temples maintained by the Department of Hindu Religious and Charitable Endowments. Prabhu met Mariasamy, the first non-Brahmin temple priest, and gathered a lot of information about the changes.

== Release and reception ==
The film was released on 29 October 2021 on the streaming platform, SonyLIV. A critic from The Times of India noted that the film was an "earnest but simplistic conversation on caste and reservation" and gave the film a positive review. In contrast, a critic from The New Indian Express noted "the film aims for the skies, but the convoluted writing ensures that it never rises above the ceiling". A critic from Sify stated that "Overall, Yennanga Sir Unga Sattam is a good watch for the topical second half of the film. However, an urgent trimming is required in the first half".
