= Parole (2022 film) =

2022 crime thriller film

- Theatrical release poster
- Directed by: Dwarakh Raja
- Written by: Dwarakh Raja
- Produced by: S. Madhusudhanan
- Starring: R. S. Karthiik; Linga; Kalpika Ganesh; Monisha Murali
- Narrated by: Vijay Sethupathi
- Cinematography: Magesh Thirunavukarasu
- Edited by: Muniez
- Music by: Rajkumar Amal
- Production company: Tripr Entertainment
- Release date: 11 November 2022
- Running time: 118 minutes
- Country: India
- Language: Tamil

Parole is a 2022 Indian Tamil-language crime thriller film written and directed by Dwarakh Raja, who previously made Kadhal Kasakuthaiya (2016). The film features R. S. Karthiik, Linga, Kalpika Ganesh and Monisha Murali in the lead roles. The film began production during mid-2021.

The film revolves around two brothers, firstly, Karikalan (Linga) and secondly, Kovalan (R. S. Karthiik), whose mother is expired. Both of them express how they feel about each other and how they have ended up where they are. The film's narrative is based on the Rashomon effect.

== Plot ==
Kovalan and Karikalan are brothers, Karikalan is in jail for the crimes he has committed however during his prison period their mother passes away. Whether Karikalan came out of jail in Parole for the last rites, did the divided brothers come together forms the crux of the story. It is told as an action-crime drama which is rooted in a cut-throat atmosphere. Parole also has a lot of characters who are primarily outlaws.

== Cast ==
- R. S. Karthiik as Kovalan
  - Ajith Kumar as young Kovalan
- Linga as Karikalan
  - Jojin Johny as young Karikalan
- Kalpika Ganesh as Thendral
- Monisha Murali as Kavi
- Vinodhini Vaidyanathan as Advocate Gifty Maria
- Janaki Suresh as Aarayi
- Viswanath Mandalika as Kyoshi Sabesh
- Shivam as Beef
- Finally Bharath as Singapooran
- TSR Srinivasan as Trichy court judge
- Kasthuri Paati as Kovalan's neighbour
- Dennis as Phenyl
- Engaeyum Eppothum Kumaravadivel as High court male judge

== Soundtrack ==
The soundtrack was composed by first-timer Rajkumar Amal.

Parole

Soundtrack album by Rajkumar Amal
- Released: 12 November 2022
- Recorded: 2022
- Genre: Feature film soundtrack
- Length: 23:56
- Language: Tamil
- Producer: Rajkumar Amal

Track listing
No.	Title	Lyrics	Singer(s)	Length
1.	"Vaa Maa Thendral"	Madhan Karky	G. V. Prakash Kumar	4:32
2.	"Mera Madha Margaya"	Asal Kolaar, Rajkumar Amal	Asal Kolaar, Rajkumar Amal	3:05
3.	"Neurobass Ninam"	Dwarakh Raja	OfRo	3:31
4.	"Anbe Gadhi"	Dwarakh Raja	Jonita Gandhi	4:38
5.	"Agandhaiye"	Madhan Karky	Santhosh Jayakaran	4:23
6.	"Po Maa Thendral"	Puratchi Kanal	Santhosh Jayakaran	3:47
Total length:				23:56

== Reception ==
A critic from The Times of India wrote that "Parole is not a great film, but definitely a very good attempt that deserves an applause for its power-packed writing".
