= Maanagaram =

2017 Indian film by Lokesh Kanagaraj

- Theatrical release poster
- Directed by: Lokesh Kanagaraj
- Written by: Lokesh Kanagaraj; Karthik Yogi; Chandhru Anbazhagan
- Produced by: S. R. Prakashbabu; S. R. Prabhu; P. Gopinath; V. Prabhu; R. Thanga Prabhaharan
- Starring: Shri; Sundeep Kishan; Regina Cassandra
- Cinematography: Selvakumar S. K.
- Edited by: Philomin Raj
- Music by: Javed Riaz
- Production company: Potential Studios
- Distributed by: Potential Studios
- Release date: 10 March 2017
- Running time: 137 minutes
- Country: India
- Language: Tamil
- Budget: ₹5 crore
- Box office: est.₹15 crore

Maanagaram (transl. Metropolis) is a 2017 Indian Tamil-language crime thriller film directed and co-written by Lokesh Kanagaraj (in his feature directorial debut) and produced by Potential Studios. The film stars Shri, Sundeep Kishan, and Regina Cassandra. Its soundtrack was composed by Javed Riaz.

The film was released on 10 March 2017 to positive reviews from critics. It won two Tamil Nadu State Film Awards: Best Film and Best Director (Lokesh). The film was remade in Hindi as Mumbaikar (2023).

== Plot ==
Barani V., (Note: Not named in the narrative, only in the screenplay.) an engineering graduate from small-town Trichy, arrives in Chennai to interview for an IT job in Business Process Outsourcing. Barani passes his interview with HR officer Aarthy and celebrates at a bar with his friends. Another man at the bar, Jeeva, has had an unrequited love for Aarthy since they were in college. In a flashback, goons threaten to throw acid in Aarthy's face if she responds to Jeeva's feelings. Enraged, Jeeva punches one of the goons. In the present, the goons recognize Jeeva in the bar and hire some gang members to beat him up. However, the gang members mistake Barani for their target and beat him when he leaves the bar, knocking him unconscious and stealing his phone and bag, throwing the latter into a taxi cab.

Nataraj has come to the city to seek medical treatment for his son while driving a taxi rented from gangster P. K. Pandian "P. K. P.". He finds Barani's bag in his taxi with his academic certificates, which he takes to the police station. In the morning, Barani awakens in the street and calls a friend to take him home. He boards a bus to his new job, to explain about his missing academic certificates. Jeeva boards the same bus to attend a job interview at Aarthy's company. He recognizes the goon who threatened Aarthy and attacks him with acid, then escapes with his friends. Barani is detained by the police, having unwittingly passed the bottle of acid to Jeeva. Fatigued by the hostility of the city, Barani argues with the police inspector who beats him until a constable intervenes. The constable talks with Barani at a tea stall, where Barani recognizes the man who told him to pass the acid bottle, and the constable arrests him.

The gang members plot to kidnap schoolboy Karthick "Karthi" for ransom, sending a man named Winnings to trick his teachers. Winnings is unprepared when there are five boys named Karthi, one of whom volunteers to go with Winnings in order to avoid a mathematics test. They take the boy but later realize he is the son of gangster P. K. P. Brani tells Aarthy that he no longer wants the job. She asks him to take the company's training so that she won't be held responsible for his quitting. They begin to argue about it and Jeeva, who is waiting for his interview, intervenes. The police arrive and take Jeeva away, saddening Aarthy who loves Jeeva but cannot accept his carefree nature. Barani tells Aarthy that he lost his academic certificates, and she agrees to cover for him for a day.

P. K. P. orders his henchmen to hunt down his enemies in a search for Karthi. The gang demand ₹1 crore (equivalent to ₹1.4 crore or US$150,000 in 2023) ransom and P. K. P. agrees to follow their instructions. Meanwhile, Jeeva is released by the police inspector, who is his uncle. Jeeva waits for Aarthy at a bus stop outside her hostel. Aarthy sees Karthi, who had escaped the kidnappers, hiding in a truck and instructs Jeeva to take Karthi home. Jeeva tries to call P. K. P. but his phone is off. He then meets his uncle and leaves Karthi in the police inspector's custody. Winnings, who is terrified of P. K. P., confesses the kidnapping to the inspector, who commands Winnings to go through with the ransom exchange. Jeeva arrives and realizes the situation. The inspector shoots P. K. P. and tries to shoot Winnings but Jeeva shoots the inspector in the leg and instructs Winnings to take P. K. P. and Karthi to the hospital.

Meanwhile, Barani is riding in Nataraj's taxi when they are stopped and attacked by the gang who believe they are spying for P. K. P. They threaten to kill Nataraj if Barani does not bring P. K. P. To allow Nataraj to escape and take care of his sick son, Barani fights back against the gang who he recognizes as his attackers from the bar. Barani's lost academic certificates are returned to his home address. Outside the hospital, Barani and Jeeva each talk to their girlfriends. They are about to introduce themselves to each other when they are challenged by another gang hired by the goon Jeeva punched. Jeeva and Barani charge toward the gang to defend themselves.

== Cast ==
- Shri as Barani V.
- Sundeep Kishan as Jeeva
- Regina Cassandra as Aarthy
- Charle as Nataraj
- Munishkanth as Winnings
- Madhusudhan as P. K. P. alias P. K. Pandian
- Ravi Venkatraman as Inspector S. Neelakandan
- Arun Alexander as Malli
- Sha-Ra as Winnings' kidnapping gang member
- Sathish as Winnings' kidnapping gang member
- Dheena as P. K. P.'s main henchman
- Karthik Yogi as Raamki a.k.a. Ramakrishnan
- Master Hamresh as Karthick
- R. S. Karthik as Jeeva's friend
- Vivek Prasanna as Jeeva's friend
- Rekha Suresh as Nataraj's wife
- Vanitha Hariharan as Pooja
- Master Ashish as Nataraj's son
- Tigergarden Thangadurai as another job candidate
- Vinoth as another taxi driver
- Pasupathi Raj as SI M. Rajendran
- Subramani as the PT Master
- Visweswara Rao as a bus passenger
- Sethupathi Jayachandran as Chinnamalai (uncredited)

== Production ==
In April 2015, actor Sundeep Kishan began working on the project with writer and director Lokesh Kanagaraj, produced by S. R. Prabhu's production house Potential Studios. Sundeep had earlier expressed an interest in producing the film himself, but later became busy with other commitments. Lokesh had previously worked as a director in Karthik Subbaraj's anthology film project, Aviyal (2016), in which his short film Kalam was included. The story was discussed with associate directors Maharajothi, Krisha, Archana and Gopi, titled Maanagaram and promoted as a dark comedy thriller. Actor Sri and Regina Cassandra were signed on to play other lead roles, with filming beginning later that month. Actors Charle and Munishkanth were subsequently signed and the project was completed by September 2015. The film was revealed to be based on hyperlink cinema with Regina's role constant throughout the film. The film was shot and completed within a period of 46 days. Potential Studios began promoting the film in February 2016, but later postponed efforts until early 2017 to get a better date for a theatrical release.

== Music ==
Maanagaram

Soundtrack album by Javed Riaz
- Released: 22 August 2016
- Recorded: 2016
- Language: Tamil
- Label: Divo
- Producer: Javed Riaz

Javed Riaz chronology
| Aviyal (2016) | Maanagaram (2016) | Anbirkiniyal (2021) |

The film's score and soundtrack were composed by Javed Riaz. The album was released on 22 August 2016. Riaz previously collaborated with Lokesh Kanagaraj for a segment in Aviyal. A writer from The Hindu called the song "Yendi Unna Pidikkuthu" as the album's highlight and added that "The song’s guitar-layered melody builds steadily, banking on Karthik’s vocal dexterity, even taking on a fantastic celtic sound midway and moving on to a punchy, highly-rhythmic interlude".

Track listing
| No. | Title | Lyrics | Singer(s) | Length |
|---|---|---|---|---|
| 1. | "Iravu Vettai Aaduthey" | Lalithanand | Suraj Jagan | 3:01 |
| 2. | "Yendi Unna Pidikkuthu" | Lalithanand | Karthik | 3:45 |
| 3. | "Vaazhvey Oru Poro" | Lalithanand | Sharanya Gopinath, Suraj Jagan, Lawrence | 3:42 |
| 4. | "Thollai Seiyum Kadhal" | Lalithanand | Aarthi N. Ashwin | 3:18 |
| 5. | "It's a Story" | Anthony Faze | Sharanya Gopinath | 2:58 |

== Release ==
Maanagaram was released on 10 March 2017. Prior to release, the producers held preview shows for the film in Chennai. Both screenings were attended by film personalities, who widely praised the film. The film had a simultaneous release for its Telugu dubbed version, Nagaram. The film had its television premiere on Star Vijay during Diwali.

== Reception ==
Deccan Chronicle called the film "an absorbing emotional thriller that is a must-watch", adding "with a solid story, deft handling and a seamless screenplay (despite a complex script), extracting the best of performances from the entire cast, picture-perfect frames (Selvakumar), engrossing music (Javed Riaz) and crisp editing (Philomin Raj), Lokesh has weaved a captivating thriller which is not to be missed". Sify stated "Maanagaram is a gripping film that seizes your full attention" and that it was "one of most genuine films in recent times". Similarly, a critic from The Times of India noted "director Lokesh Kanagaraj gives us an exquisite, even-handed thriller — handsomely shot, tightly edited and propped up by a grungy score — that unobtrusively makes its points while narrating a gripping story". S. Shivakumar of The Hindu opined that "Each scene makes you eagerly await the next with a climax that is befitting". Baradwaj Rangan wrote for Film Companion, "The air-tight deliberateness of this structure is given room to breathe by the randomness of the characters, who behave in ways we don’t expect." The New Indian Express wrote that "All that it needs is a solid screenplay, deft treatment and a right selection of cast to make it an interesting and an eminently watchable fare. 'Maanagaram' is proof of that!" Srivatsan wrote for India Today, "Showcasing the capital of Tamil Nadu in a grim light, that too in his debut film is as close to jeopardising one's career as possible [...] But Lokesh Kanagaraj writing in Maanagaram is unparalleled, considering the recent set of sappy releases. Be it the characters that come throughout the film or tight screenplay, Lokesh's work doesn't seem amateurish".

After release, several other Tamil film personalities including Rajinikanth and Suriya voiced their praise for the film.

== Accolades ==
| Award | Category | Recipient(s) and nominee(s) | Result | Ref. |
|---|---|---|---|---|
| Ananda Vikatan Cinema Awards | Best Comedian – Male | Munishkanth | Won | |
| Norway Tamil Film Festival Awards | Best Comedian | Munishkanth | Won | |
| 10th Vijay Awards | Best Debut Director | Lokesh Kanagaraj | Won | |
| 10th Vijay Awards | Best Editor | Philomin Raj | Won | |
| Tamil Nadu State Film Awards | Best Film | Maanagaram | Won | |
| Tamil Nadu State Film Awards | Best Director | Lokesh Kangaraj | Won | |

== Legacy ==
The film was remade in Hindi as Mumbaikar (2023). The screenplay of the original film published as a book by Pesaamozhi Publication and released in January 2023. It also revealed the names of several characters whose names were not mentioned in the film.
