= M. K. Mustafa =

Indian actor

M.K. Mustafa
- Born: 1921; Keezhapongudi, Ramnad Madras presidency
- Died: 14 August 1992 (aged 70–71)
- Occupation: Actor
- Years active: 1940–1972
- Parents: Mohammad Abdul khader Sahib (father); Mariyam beevi Nachiyar (mother)

M. K. Mustafa (died 14 August 1992) was an Indian actor who appeared in Tamil-language films. He appeared in many films in 1940 to around 1972, and he was a close friend of M. G. Ramachandran, and a member of MGR's drama troupe during the 1950s.

== Partial filmography ==
- Kanjan as Loganathan
- Abhimanyu as Karnan
- Marmayogi
- Kaithi as Inspector Kesavan
- Rani
- Needhipathi
- Naane Raja
- Yaar Paiyyan as Kumar
- Sivagangai Seemai as Chinna Maruthu
- Thirudathe as Raju
- Parisu as Ragu
- Ezhai Pangalan
- Veera Abhimanyu as Dronan
- Thazampoo
- Chinnanchiru Ulagam
- Thayin Madiyil
- Harichandra as Minister
- Thayin Mel Aanai
- Sange Muzhangu
- Rickshakaran
- Snehithi
