= Teejay Arunasalam =

British actor (born 1994)

- Other name: Teejay
- Occupations: Actor, playback singer
- Years active: 2016–present

Teejay Arunasalam is a British playback singer and actor who has worked in Indian cinema, particularly Tamil language films. After making his acting debut in the Tamil film Asuran (2019) alongside Dhanush, he has also appeared in significant roles in Thatrom Thookrom (2020), anthology web series Putham Pudhu Kaalai Vidiyaadhaa (2022), and in Pathu Thala (2023) with Silambarasan.

== Career ==
Teejay rose to fame through his work as a singer on independent Tamil music albums in the early 2010s. He worked on albums with US-based singer Pragathi Guruprasad, and other UK-based singers such as Inno Genga and Arjun. He went on to pursue a degree in airport and airline management at university, before switching to study music.

Teejay announced that he would make his acting debut in the Tamil film industry through Amsana, a low-budget romantic drama, made by a cast and crew of debutants during August 2016. The film was later stalled but Teejay stayed in Chennai to try and pursue his career as a playback singer. He was then cast in the lead role of Thatrom Thookrom (2020) during December 2017 by debutant director Arul. The film's production was delayed and it subsequently had a limited release in late 2020, as Teejay's second release.

Teejay won critical acclaim for his role as Velmurugan in Vetrimaaran's Asuran (2019), appearing as the son of the characters portrayed by Dhanush and Manju Warrier. He was cast in the film after being referred to Vetrimaaran by his friend, actress Andrea Jeremiah. Teejay won positive reviews for his depiction. He later appeared in Balaji Mohan's short film in the anthology series Putham Pudhu Kaalai Vidiyaadhaa by Amazon Prime.

As of 2022, Teejay is working on Pathu Thala (2022), where he appears in a supporting role in an ensemble cast headed by Silambarasan, Gautham Karthik and Kalaiyarasan. He will also appear in a leading role in an untitled film co-produced by director A. L. Vijay, where he features alongside actresses Vani Bhojan and Amritha Aiyer.

Teejay has often reported his inclusion as an actor in larger film projects to the media, though he later did not feature. This included projects such as Ajay Gnanamuthu's Cobra (2022), Mani Ratnam's Ponniyin Selvan: II (2023), the biopic of Muttiah Muralitharan titled 800, and an untitled film by Gautham Vasudev Menon.

== Filmography ==
Key
†	Denotes films that have not yet been released

=== As actor ===
Year	Title	Role	Notes
2019	Asuran	Velmurugan Sivasaami	
2020	Thatrom Thookrom	Karthik	
2022	Putham Pudhu Kaalai Vidiyaadhaa	Murugan	Web-series; Segment: Mugakavasa Mutham
2023	Pathu Thala	Selvin	
2025	Bad Girl	Irfan	
2025	Usurae	Raghava	
2025	Aaromaley	Michael	Cameo appearance
2025	Vilayath Buddha	Maari	
2026	Jana Nayagan	Karthik	
2026	G.D.N	Young G.D.N	
2026	HOD †	Mohan	
2026	Free Love †	Dev	

=== As playback singer ===
Year	Song title	Film/Album	Music director
2016	"Paani Poori"	Sawaari	Vishal Chandrasekhar
2018	"Maanam Pochu" "IAMK Party Song"	Iruttu Araiyil Murattu Kuththu	Balamurali Balu
2018	"Poraali"	Traffic Ramasamy	Balamurali Balu
2018	"Vedigundu Pasangge Theme Song"	Vedigundu Pasangge	Vivek–Mervin
2018	"Wake Me Up Everyday"	Pyaar Prema Kaadhal	Yuvan Shankar Raja
2018	"Kadhal Oru Aagayam"	Imaikkaa Nodigal	Hiphop Tamizha
2018	"Polladha Bhoomi" "Ey Minukki"	Asuran	G. V. Prakash Kumar
2020	"Porenu Nee Pona"	Anbulla Ghilli	Arrol Corelli

=== As singer ===
==== EPs ====
Year	Song title	EP	Music director
2013	"Omiya"	Vaanavil The Quest	Vernon G Seagram & Teejay
2013	"Alaipaya"	Vaanavil The Quest	Vernon G Seagram & Teejay
2013	"Vaanavil"	Vaanavil The Quest	Vernon G Seagram & Teejay
2013	"Kettikaran"	Vaanavil The Quest	Vernon G Seagram & Teejay
2013	"Muttu Muttu"	Vaanavil The Quest	Vernon G Seagram & Teejay
2013	"Aasai"	Vaanavil The Quest	Vernon G Seagram & Teejay
2014	"Home Sweet Home"	Maze In Idhayam	Teejay
2014	"Bommei"	Maze In Idhayam	Teejay
2014	"Therinjo Theriyamalo"	Maze In Idhayam	Teejay
2014	"Humssana"	Maze In Idhayam	Teejay
2014	"Vaayadi"	Maze In Idhayam	Teejay
2014	"Gollusey"	Maze In Idhayam	Teejay
2014	"Thaen Kudika"	Maze In Idhayam	Teejay
2014	"Mayavan"	Maze In Idhayam	Teejay
2014	"Modhiram Mati Ponga"	Maze In Idhayam	Teejay
2014	"Lost in Maze"	Maze In Idhayam	Teejay
2014	"Vaanavil - Rainbow"	Maze In Idhayam	Teejay
2021	"Kanden"	Bandana Vol 1	Hemz, Jegz & Teejay
2021	"Snapchat"	Bandana Vol 1	Hemz, Jegz & Teejay
2021	"Shy Girl"	Bandana Vol 1	Hemz, Jegz & Teejay
2021	"I Could Do Better"	Bandana Vol 1	Hemz, Jegz & Teejay
2021	"Doli Doli"	Bandana Vol 1	Hemz, Jegz & Teejay
2021	"Night Drive"	Bandana Vol 1	Hemz, Jegz & Teejay
2021	"Zzz"	Bandana Vol 1	Hemz, Jegz & Teejay
2021	"Love Blind"	Bandana Vol 1	Hemz, Jegz & Teejay
2025	"Konji Urakura"	Promise	Teejay

==== Singles ====
Year	Song title	Music director
2017	"Vellai Poove"	Deyo
2022	"Muttu Mu2"	TeeJay Arunasalam
2023	"Imaye"	TeeJay Arunasalam
2024	"Love BGM"	TeeJay Arunasalam
2024	"Un Peru Enna"	TeeJay Arunasalam
