= Peechaankai =

2017 Indian film by Ashok

- Theatrical release poster
- Directed by: Ashok
- Written by: Ashok
- Produced by: R. S. Karthik; P. G. Muthiah
- Starring: R. S. Karthik; Anjali Rao
- Cinematography: Gautham Rajendran
- Edited by: Jomin Mathew
- Music by: Balamurali Balu
- Production companies: PG Media Works; KARSA Entertainment
- Release date: 15 June 2017
- Running time: 126 minutes
- Country: India
- Language: Tamil

Peechaankai (transl. Left Hand) is a 2017 Indian Tamil-language black comedy film written and directed by Ashok and co-produced by PG Media Works. The film stars R. S. Karthik and Anjali Rao, while M. S. Bhaskar, Vivek Prasanna, and K. S. G. Venkatesh played other pivotal roles. The music was composed by Balamurali Balu with cinematography by Gautham Rajendran and editing by Jomin Mathew. The film released on 15 June 2017.

== Plot ==
S. Muthu alias Smoothu is a famous left-handed pickpocket who operates along with his gang. Rita and Ravi. in Chennai. He does have some ethics, but a sudden accident causes him to suffer a brain injury which results in alien hand syndrome (AHS). Smoothu's left hand stops obeying his command and gets a mind of its own. It becomes his moral self, stopping him from doing the wrong things. Smoothu needs 3 lakh (300,000) rupees to cure his condition, so he takes up an assignment from a team of gangsters to steal a politician's phone. What happens next is a series of mishap comedies caused by his alien hand, which at last triumphs over the evil forces (the politician and gangsters).

== Cast ==
- R. S. Karthik as S. Muthu ("Smoothu")
- Anjali Rao as Abhirami
- M. S. Bhaskar as Thamizhmagan
- Vivek Prasanna as Nallathambi
- K. S. G. Venkatesh as Uthaman
- Sruthi Menon as Rita
- Arun as Ravi
- Ponmudi as Gaja
- Jithendar as Joseph
- Krish Haran as Krish
- Andrew Jaypaul as Maari
- Ramjee as Abhirami's father
- Bhoositha as Shruthi
- Master Tavanesh Karthik as Letter Boy
- Gunalan Morgan as Nallathambi's assistant
- Kathir as Nallathambi's assistant
- VTV Vicky as Nallathambi's assistant
- Sundar as Nallathambi's assistant
- Naveen Seetharaman as Doctor

== Production ==
Ashok, a software engineer-turned-filmmaker made a telefilm of the same name and due to creative differences, he could not get other producers on board. So R. S. Karthik, who played the lead in the telefilm, produced the Film Karthik was retained as lead in the feature film as well, and Anjali Rao, who played STR’s sister in Gautham Vasudev Menon's Achcham Yenbadhu Madamaiyada, essayed Karthik's romantic interest. Peechaankai which was shot in and around Chennai, with the first look being unveiled by filmmakers Karthik Subbaraj and Samuthirakani in February 2017. Actor Arya and director Gautham Vasudev Menon each released a singles of the film, actor Vijay Sethupathi released the trailer, and it became instantly viral. Stylist Sruthi Menon also made her acting debut in feature films through the project.

== Soundtrack ==
The soundtrack was composed by first-timer Balamurali Balu.

Peechankai

Soundtrack album by Balamurali Balu
- Released: 2017
- Length: 15:52
- Language: Tamil
- Label: TrendMusic
- Producer: Balamurali Balu

Balamurali Balu chronology
Peechankai (2017)	Hara Hara Mahadevaki (2017)

No.	Title	Lyrics	Singers	Length
1.	"Peechaankai"	Sugumar Ganesan	Anthony Daasan, Sharanya Gopinath	3:34
2.	"Smoodhu En Peru"	Sugumar Ganesan	Deepak, Shanthini Sathiyanathan	3:41
3.	"Loveu Songu"	Balamurali Balu	Santosh Hariharan, Yamini G	3:36
4.	"Tom and Jerry"	Sugumar Ganesan, Balamurali Balu, Sharmila, Ashok	Balamurali Balu, Sahana Muthaiya, Athira Balu, Janani Kabilan, Nilani Kabilan, Sharmila	3:27
5.	"Gibberish"		Balamurali Balu	1:34
Total length:				15:52

== Release ==
The film was released on 15 June 2017 across Tamil Nadu.

== Reception ==
A critic at The Hindu gave the film a positive review. A critic from The Times of India noted, Peechaankai is driven by its high-concept premise — what if our hand starts to have a mind of its own! Director Ashok sets his film based on this idea against a background that involves criminals and politicians, and gives us a black comedy that is certainly novel, mostly funny and somewhat overlong". A reviewer from Behindwoods.com gave the film a positive review, stating "the writing has been a big strength for the film and debutant Ashok has also cleverly worked on the screenplay at most parts", while "the film works well in most parts, as the audience connect well with the characters, thanks to the humour and again, the writing". The critic added "however, the slow pace of the movie, especially in the second half, is worrying and it takes some time to keep you engaged". Baradwaj Rangan of Film Companion wrote "The film is hit-and-miss. The director can certainly think out of the box... A film with this premise should have been way funnier."
