= Udanpaal =

2022 Indian Tamil-Language film

- Official poster
- Directed by: Karthik Seenivasan
- Written by: Karthik Seenivasan
- Story by: A. R. Raghavendran; Karthik Seenivasan
- Produced by: K. V. Durai
- Starring: Linga; Gayathrie; Vivek Prasanna
- Cinematography: Madhan Christopher
- Edited by: G. Madan
- Music by: Sakthi Balaji
- Production company: D Company
- Distributed by: aha Tamil
- Release date: 30 December 2022
- Country: India
- Language: Tamil

Udanpaal is a 2022 Indian Tamil-language comedy drama film directed by Karthik Seenivasan and starring Linga, Gayathrie and Vivek Prasanna in the lead roles. It was released on 30 December 2022 in Aha Tamil.

== Plot ==
Despite their poor financial situation, Parama and his sister Kanmani fiercely reject to suggest their father, Vinayagam, to sell their house. Later, unfortunately, Vinayagam passes away in an unexpected catastrophe, even in that distraught situation family members of Vinayagam become greedy regarding the benefits the government is going to offer to the victim's family. However, fate takes a new turn, making the situation simultaneously tragic and humorous.

== Cast ==
- Linga as Parama
- Gayathrie as Kanmani
- Vivek Prasanna as Murali
- Abarnathi as Prema
- Charle as Vinayagam
- Nakkalites Dhanam
- Dheena as Parthiban
- Dharshith Santosh as Vigan
- Mayilsamy as Vinayagam's friend

== Production ==
The ensemble cast shot the entire film in one schedule in the same location. In early December 2022, the makers of the film announced that they had decided to skip its theatrical release and release it on the aha Tamil platform.

== Reception ==
The film was released on 30 December 2022 on the aha Tamil platform, with reviews from critics being released during the week prior to release. A reviewer from Times of India wrote "it's not often you get to watch a quirky, innovative family drama - and, especially when the film manages to double as a dark comedy, you can't help but buy it". The critic added that "Udanpaal, directed by debutant Karthik Sreenivasan, is a product of effective writing that tells you how to engage the audience with a small number of characters and their morbid actions". Critic Manigandan K. R. wrote "director Karthik Seenivasan’s Udanpaal is an exceptionally well made dark comedy drama that, while making us laugh, also makes us ponder about the deteriorating standards of individuals when it comes to morality, gratitude and love". Reviewers from The Hindu and Nakkheeran also gave the film positive reviews.
