= Sri Natarajan =

Indian actor

Shriram Natarajan
- Born: Shriram Natarajan; 30 November 1987 (age 38); Madras, Tamil Nadu, India
- Education: Alpha Arts and Science College, Chennai.
- Occupation: Actor
- Years active: 2008–2017, 2023–present

Shriram Natarajan (born 30 November 1987), known by his stage name Shri, is an Indian actor who has appeared in Tamil films. He has appeared in critically acclaimed films such as Vazhakku Enn 18/9 (2012), Onaayum Aattukkuttiyum (2013), Vil Ambu (2016), Maanagaram (2017), and Irugapatru (2023).

== Career ==
While pursuing a degree in Visual Communications at Alpha and Arts Science College, later at Loyola College, Sri appeared in his first acting role in the television serial Kana Kaanum Kaalangal on STAR Vijay and tried to audition for the lead role in Balaji Sakthivel's Kalloori (2007), without success. Sri was subsequently cast in the director's next film, the drama thriller Vazhakku Enn 18/9 (2012) featuring newcomers, and it went on to open to unanimously positive reviews. To prepare for the role, he went to roadside eateries in Ramapuram and familiarised himself in the lifestyle of settlers. It subsequently went on to win the National Film Award for Best Feature Film in Tamil, as well as Best Film at both the Vijay Awards and the Filmfare Awards, while a reviewer from The Hindu praised Sri's performance, adding "he has large eyes that reveal the right amount of innocence." The success of the film saw him gain further offers, but he was reluctant to only opt for promising scripts and turned down an opportunity to work on Nalan Kumarasamy's Soodhu Kavvum (2013) during the period. His second film, Mysskin's Onaayum Aattukkuttiyum (2013) also fetched critical acclaim, with a critic from Sify.com noting Sri delivers "a riveting performance and is an actor of substance in the making." His following film, the comedy Soan Papdi (2015) had low-profile responses at the box office, even though the latter received good reviews. And Vil Ambu (2016), which was presented by director Suseenthiran, did pretty well at the box office, opening gates for Sri as a Commercial Star.

Sri's next film was Maanagaram (2017) directed by newcomer Lokesh Kanagaraj, featured him alongside Sundeep Kishan and Regina Cassandra. Portraying a young man frustrated with life in Chennai, Sri won critical acclaim for his role in the film, while the film went on to become one of the most profitable films of the year. Sri then participated in the first season of the Tamil reality show Bigg Boss being the first ever contestant to enter Bigg Boss Tamil, but left the show on the fourth day due to personal problems. In mid-2023, he began work on a film produced by Potential Studios (who produced Maanagaram) titled Irugaapatru.

== Personal life ==
As of April 2025, Sri has garnered significant attention and concern following a series of videos and photos posted on his Instagram account. These posts represented a notable shift from his previously low-profile public image and sparked widespread alarm among fans regarding his mental and physical well-being. Observers noted a marked physical transformation in Sri, with visible weight loss leading to speculation about potential health issues or emotional distress. Some followers questioned whether he might be experiencing depression or a mental health crisis. Lokesh later revealed that Sri was undergoing medical treatment.

== Filmography ==
Key
†	Denotes films that have not yet been released

Year	Film	Role	Notes
2012	Vazhakku Enn 18/9	Pa. Veluchamy	
2013	Onaayum Aatukuttiyum	Chandru	
2015	Soan Papdi	Shiva	
2016	Vil Ambu	Karthik	
2017	Maanagaram	Barani	
2023	Irugapatru	Arjun	

=== Television ===
Year	Series/Shows	Role	Channel	Notes
2008–2009	Kana Kaanum Kaalangal Season 2	Sri Ram	Star Vijay	
2017	Bigg Boss Tamil 1	Contestant	Star Vijay	Walked Out on Day 4 due to health issues.
