= With Love =

With Love may refer to:

== Music ==
=== Albums ===
- ...with Love, by Mary Byrne
- With Love (Amanda Lear album), 2006
- With Love (Bobby Vinton album), 1974
- With Love (Charles Tolliver album), 2006
- With Love, Chér, 1967
- With Love (Christina Grimmie album), 2013
- With Love (Craig Owens album), 2009
- With Love (Michael Bublé EP), 2006
- With Love (Michael Crawford album), 1989
- With Love (Mya EP), 2014
- With Love (Pete Townshend album), 1976
- With Love (Rosemary Clooney album), 1980
- With Love (Rosie Thomas album), 2012
- With Love (Tony Bennett album), 1972
- With Love (Zomby album), 2013
- With Love, a 2021 album by Jo O'Meara
- With L.O.V.E., a 2008 EP by Brown Eyed Girls

=== Songs ===
- "With Love" (Hilary Duff song), 2007
- "With Love" (Tamta song), 2007
- "With Love", a song by Thin Lizzy from Black Rose: A Rock Legend
- "With Love", a 1959 song by Cathy Carr

== Other uses ==
- With Love... Hilary Duff, a fragrance by Hilary Duff
- With Love (2018 film), a Canadian thriller film
- With Love (2026 film), a 2026 Indian Tamil-language romance film
- With Love (TV series), an American television series

== See also ==
- With Luv', a 1978 album by Luv'
