= Thatrom Thookrom =

2020 Indian Tamil-language action drama film directed by S. Arul

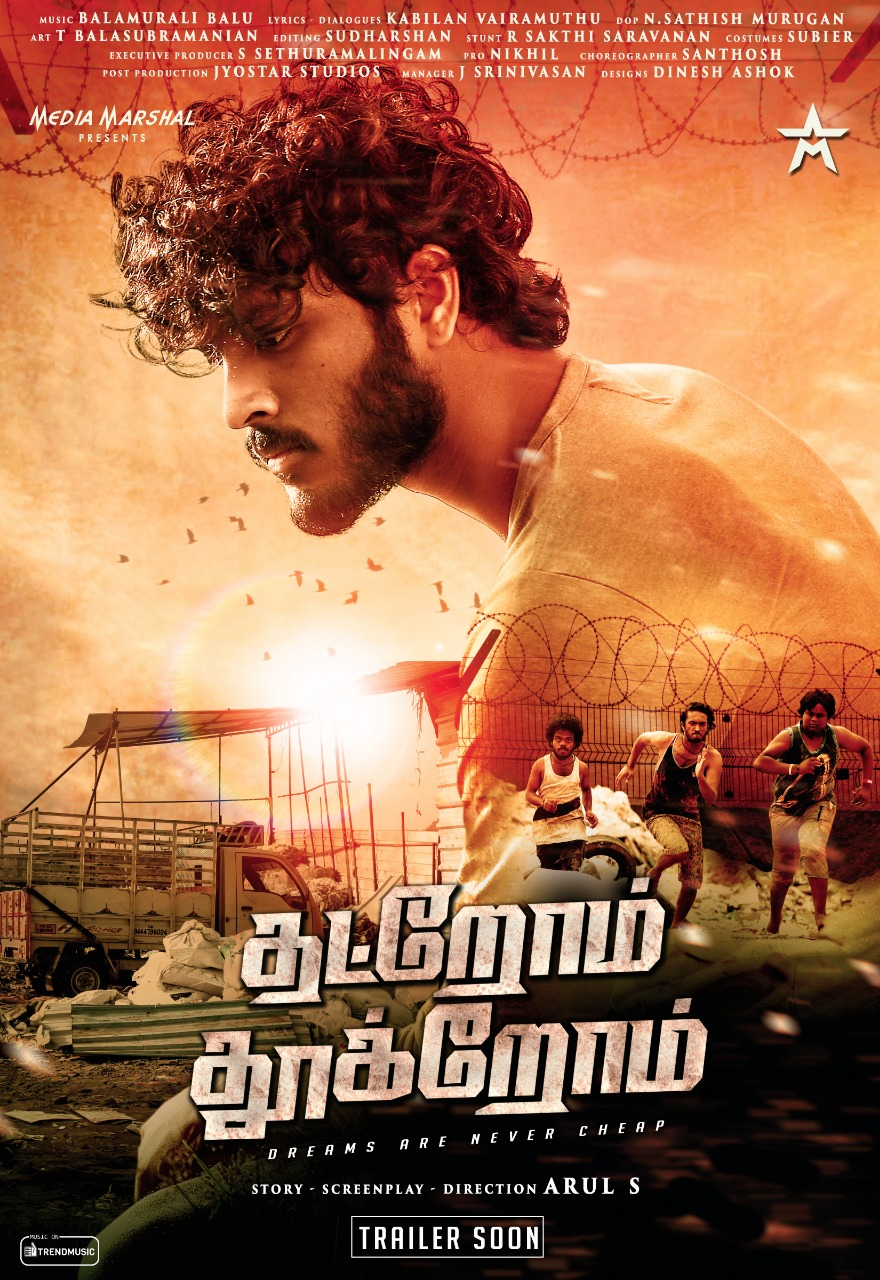
- Directed by: Arul S
- Written by: Kabilan Vairamuthu
- Produced by: Arul S
- Starring: Teejay Arunasalam; Fouziee
- Cinematography: Sathish Murugan
- Edited by: R Sudharshan
- Music by: Balamurali Balu
- Production company: Media Marshal
- Release dates: September 2020 (Toronto Tamil Film Festival); 14 November 2020
- Country: India
- Language: Tamil

Thatrom Thookrom (transl. Knock and Rock) is a 2020 Indian Tamil-language action drama film written and directed by Arul S. The film stars Teejay Arunasalam, Cheenu Mohan and Kaali Venkat while Sampath Ram portrays a negative role. Balamurali Balu composed music for the film while Kabilan Vairamuthu penned lyrics for the songs. The film had a low profile theatrical release on 14 November 2020.

== Cast ==
- Teejay Arunasalam as Kaaka
- Fouziee as Anjana
- Nandu Suresh as Kadugu
- Sakthivel Kalkona as Urulai
- Cheenu Mohan as Rajamanickam
- Kaali Venkat as Pandian
- Linga as Inspector Sekar
- Sakthi Saravanan as ACP Rajaram
- G. Marimuthu as Dhandapani
- Crane Manohar as Murugan
- Sampath Ram as Chinna
- G. V. Subba Rao
- Sivavelavan
- Ravi Venkatraman as Manikandan
- Supergood Subramani as Madhusudhanan
- Udumalai Ravi

== Production and marketing ==
The principal photography of the film began during early 2018 with Teejay Arunasalam being signed to play the lead role in 2017. Most of the portions of the film were shot and set in Chennai. The film was initially speculated to be based on the 2016 Indian banknote demonetisation, however, the director revealed that the film will not be analysing the concept.

== Music ==
The music rights for the film are owned by Balamurali Balu. The first single "Demonetisation anthem" was released during November 2017 and became viral despite controversies. The song was inspired from the demonetisation which was imposed by Indian Prime minister Narendra Modi on 8 November 2016.

== Accolades ==
- This film was officially selected at Toronto International Tamil Film Festival

== Controversy ==
A theme song about demonetisation called "Demonetisation anthem" which was sung by actor Silambarasan was released during the occasion of the first anniversary of the note ban in India in November 2017. However the song raised controversies among political fraternity particularly for its content on criticising the demonetisation. Actor Simbu was under scanner for singing the song and was provided special police protection.

== Reception ==
A critic from Maalai Malar called the film interesting.
