= Onaayum Aattukkuttiyum =

2013 Indian film by Mysskin

- Theatrical release poster
- Directed by: Mysskin
- Written by: Mysskin
- Produced by: Mysskin
- Starring: Mysskin; Sri
- Cinematography: Balaji V. Rangha
- Edited by: Gopinath
- Music by: Ilaiyaraaja
- Production company: Lone Wolf Productions
- Distributed by: Janus Pictures; Vetrivel Creations
- Release date: 27 September 2013
- Running time: 142 minutes
- Country: India
- Language: Tamil

Onaayum Aattukkuttiyum (transl. The Wolf and The Lamb) is a 2013 Indian Tamil-language crime thriller film written, directed, and produced by Mysskin. He and Sri play the lead roles. The score was composed by Ilaiyaraaja. The film had no heroine and no songs. Filming began on 11 March 2013 and the crew shot the entire film in and around Chennai city. Onaayum Aattukkuttiyum was released on 27 September 2013 and received critical acclaim.

== Plot ==
A man with a gunshot wound collapses on the side of a road, where passersby notice him but avoid taking any action. Chandru, a medical student, comes across the bleeding man and tries to get him medical help, but to no avail. Finally, he takes the stranger to his house and performs surgery to save his life. This act comes to haunt him, as the man, known as Wolf, actually escaped police that night. Chandru's entire family is taken into police custody for aiding and abetting a criminal.

Meanwhile, at the police station, a police officer is seen giving information about Wolf's whereabouts to Thamba, another criminal. Thamba wants to kill Wolf and his family. Chandru receives a phone call from Wolf, who wants to meet him at a train station. The police give Chandru a gun and ask him to kill Wolf, as they know Wolf will flee if he sees police nearby. However, Wolf kidnaps Chandru on a hijacked train. They go to a temple, where Wolf meets a blind woman. While waiting near a building, Chandru attacks Wolf with a rock and subdues him. As Chandru goes to call the police, Wolf escapes with the woman.

Chandru follows Wolf and sees him meeting another woman and a little girl who is also blind. Confronting Wolf again, Chandru threatens to shoot the girl and forces, Wolf, to the ground. They're, however, kidnapped by Thamba's men in a van. Wolf and Chandru gain control of the van after Wolf pushes out one of Thamba's men. They go to Calvary Cemetery, where another blind man awaits. All of them are actually there to light candles in a memorial for the blind man and woman's son, who was inadvertently killed by Wolf while working for Thamba. Since then, Wolf has been taking care of the family, and they, in turn, treat him like their own son. Wolf had also stopped working for Thamba, hence why Thamba wants to kill him. Just then, the police and one of Thamba's men attacked them and killed the blind man and another lady.

Wolf carries the blind woman and little girl to a basement car park, where someone is supposed to fetch them. However, Thamba's men ambush and kill the woman while Wolf was protecting the little girl. Chandru, realising Wolf is not as evil as depicted by the police, rushes to help Wolf kill Thamba's men. Wolf, convinced that Chandru would take care of the girl, shoots himself in the stomach and surrenders to the police. The movie ends with Chandru walking away from a scene, carrying the girl.

== Cast ==
- Mysskin as Wolf / Edward
- Sri as Chandru
- Shaji Chen as Lal, CBCID aids Wolf
- Adithya as Yuva
- Raj Bharath as Thamba, wants to kill Wolf
- Neelima Rani as Chandru's sister-in-law
- Baby Chaitanya as Karthi, daughter of lamb family
- Shaukat as father of lamb family
- Mona as Priscilla, mother of lamb family
- Sreeram as Isac
- Angel Glady as Bharati/Forest fairy, Caretaker of Karthi
- Supergood Subramani as Police officer
- Gajaraj as Pitchai, Cob aids Thamba
- Ravi Venkatraman

== Production ==
On 16 February 2013, Mysskin announced his new production company Lone Wolf Productions and two days later newspaper advertisements came out with the title of his new film, Onaayum Aattukkuttiyum, and its design. The film was started with a puja launch at the producer and directors office where only his close associates were present. The film was shot in and around Chennai. Most of the film was shot at night because the story is set against the backdrop of darkness.

== Music ==
Ilaiyaraaja composed the film score. The film did not have any songs and Ilaiyaraaja after two decades composed only the BGM for a film. Instrumental pieces from the score were released before the film's release. Mysskin released the background score for free to download in his production website as a tribute to Ilaiyaraaja.

Track listing
No.	Title	Length
1.	"Compassion"	00:26
2.	"Firefly"	00:38
3.	"Growl"	00:36
4.	"The Threshold Guardian"	01:11
5.	"Grim Reaper"	00:32
6.	"I Killed an Angel"	00:58
7.	"A Fairytale"	05:16
8.	"Walking Through Life and Death"	04:37
9.	"Redemption"	01:01
10.	"Somebody Loves Us All"	03:35
Total length:		18:50

== Marketing and release ==
In June 2013, a trailer of Onaiyum Aatukuttiyum was released on YouTube. Though Ilaiyaraaja was signed as the composer, the trailer had Austrian composer Gustav Mahler's Symphony No. 5. Onaayum Aattukkuttiyum was released on 27 September 2013 alongside Raja Rani, but secured fewer screens in Tamil Nadu.

== Reception ==
Sudhish Kamath from The Hindu wrote, "Mysskin has once again proved that he's one of the most exciting, even if inconsistent, filmmakers of our times. The actor-director is in sparkling form as he returns with a career-best in this dark, gritty, moody, philosophical metaphor-infested chase film that's mostly brilliant. Onaayum Aattukkuttiyum compares well with world cinema but with a little more restraint and understatement, Mysskin has every potential to breakout at the international festival circuit and make us proud someday". Sify wrote, "Onayum Aatukuttiyum is a gripping edge of the seat emotional dark thriller which also entertains". Haricharan Pudipeddi of IANS gave 4 stars out of 5 and wrote, "OA arrives sans fanfare, but it sweeps you off your feet with an engrossing narrative, told mostly through one night. OA is a cut above Mysskin`s previous works. He crushes all cinematic cliches with this effort and manages to gives us a film we deserve".

M. Suganth of The Times of India gave 3.5 stars out of 5 and wrote "on the whole, Onaiyum Aatukuttiyum, while a rung below Anjathey in the filmography of Mysskin, is a tense thriller, one of the interesting films of the year, that is yet another showcase for its maker". S. Saraswathi of Rediff.com too gave 3.5 stars out of 5 and wrote, "Mysskin has scripted a brilliant tale filled with human emotions and dark humour, cleverly maintaining the suspense element in the film until the very end". Malini Mannath of The New Indian Express wrote, "Mysskin's wolf and the lamb saga is refreshing, exciting and offers a different viewing experience to Tamil audience".

== Legacy ==
Sudish Kamath picked Onaayum Aattukkuttiyum as one of five films that have redefined Tamil cinema, writing, "Mysskin hits peak form as a storyteller with the most evolved sense of visual grammar in this part of the world". It was also featured in the year-end top Tamil films lists of Sify and Rediff.com.
