= Kanjan =

- Theatrical release poster
- Directed by: Covai A. Aiyamuthu; T. R. Gopu
- Screenplay by: Covai A. Aiyamuthu
- Story by: Covai A. Aiyamuthu
- Produced by: K. Velliangiri; C. Sundaram
- Starring: S. V. Subbaiah; M. S. S. Bhagyam; R. Mallathi; T. G. Kamala Devi
- Cinematography: P. Ramasami
- Edited by: T. R. Gopu
- Music by: S. M. Subbaiah Naidu
- Production company: Jupiter Pictures
- Release date: 11 November 1947 (India)
- Country: India
- Language: Tamil

Kanjan (transl. Miser) is a 1947 Indian Tamil-language film written and directed by Covai A. Aiyamuthu and T. R. Gopu. The film stars S. V. Subbaiah, R. Malathi and T. G. Kamala Devi. No print of the film is known to have survived, and it is considered a lost film.

== Plot ==
The film centers on a wealthy old man and his attempt to court his son's girlfriend and make her his second wife. The film highlights social evils such as black-marketing, selling of young girls, et al.

== Cast ==
Female cast

- M. S. S. Bhagyam as Chellam
- R. Malathi as Maragatham
- T. G. Kamala Devi as Amaravathi
- C. K. Saraswathi as Anjuham
- K. S. Angamuthu as Kuppayi

Male cast

- S. V. Subbaiah as Kanjan
- M. N. Nambiar as Velappan
- P. V. Narasimha Bharathi as Kumarasami
- M. K. Mustafa as Loganathan
- Nat Annaji Rao as Murugesan
- B. Rajagopala Iyer as Subodar

== Production ==
The film was produced by K. Velliangiri, a partner of Jupiter Pictures when writer Covai A. Aiyamuthu wanted to make a film. Covai A. Aiyamuthu directed the film assisted by the company's editor T. R. Gopu who also did the editing. Covai A. Aiyamuthu wrote the story and dialogues too. Cinematography was handled by P. Ramasami and art direction was by P. B. Chowdri and Kuttiyappu. C. Thangaraj was in charge of choreography. The film was made at Central Studios, in the neighbourhood of Singanallur, Coimbatore in Tamil Nadu.

== Reception ==
The film was a flop. An interesting event took place to show the enormity of its failure. About the time the film was screened in Coimbatore, a college celebrated its annual day. There was a play staged by the students. A scene showed a sinner at judgement in Yama's court. Yama says the sinner should be fried in boiling oil as punishment for his sins. Yama's accountant Chitragupta says the punishment is not enough. So Yama says, the sinner's body should be cut into pieces and fed to vultures. Again Chitragupta says the punishment is not enough. Yama thinks and comes out with a novel punishment. He says the sinner should be made to see all 3 shows of Kanjan at a stretch in the local movie theatre. The joke does not end there. The sinner wails and appeals to Yama that being fried in boiling oil and his body being fed to vultures is a more lenient punishment than having to watch the film.

The producers K. Velliangiri and C. Sundaram who were also invitees laughed at the joke. Film historian Randor Guy wrote in 2010 that the film is "Remembered for its fine music and some of its cast who became major stars later.

== Soundtrack ==
Music was composed by S. M. Subbaiah Naidu while the lyrics were penned by Covai A. Aiyamuthu. A song Mandaril ezhil udayon engal Tamizhan (Tamils are the most elegant among mankind). It is said that the producers waited for 6 months after completing the shooting to record this song by Mariyappa.

No	Song	Singer	Lyrics	Length(m:ss)
1	"Inda Ulagini Irukkam Mandaril}	M. M. Mariyappa	Covai A. Aiyamuthu	03:16
2	"Varayo Muruga Manala Varuga"		Covai A. Aiyamuthu	
3	"Athai Magale Nillay"	M. M. Mariyappa, K. V. Janaki	Covai A. Aiyamuthu	03:14
4	"Vayatrai Pichikku Thenpal"		Covai A. Aiyamuthu	
5	"Kaikku Pathu Valaiyal Venum"		Covai A. Aiyamuthu	
6	"Pichai Karananen"	Thiruchi Loganathan	Covai A. Aiyamuthu	03:18
7	"Yare Nee Kooraye Mane"		Covai A. Aiyamuthu	
8	"Neelavanilave Adhavan Pole"	K. V. Janaki, Thiruchi Loganathan	Covai A. Aiyamuthu	03:06
9	"Kallaneruvan En Ullathaiye"	K. V. Janaki	Covai A. Aiyamuthu	03:09
10	"Neersoozhntha Natellam"	M. M. Mariyappa	Covai A. Aiyamuthu	02:05
11	"Aaha Ini Yare Puvi Meethe Nampole"	M. M. Mariyappa, K. V. Janaki	Covai A. Aiyamuthu	02:09
12	"Vazhka Thamizh Nadu Vazhka Vazhkave"		Covai A. Aiyamuthu	
