= R. S. Karthiik =

Indian actor

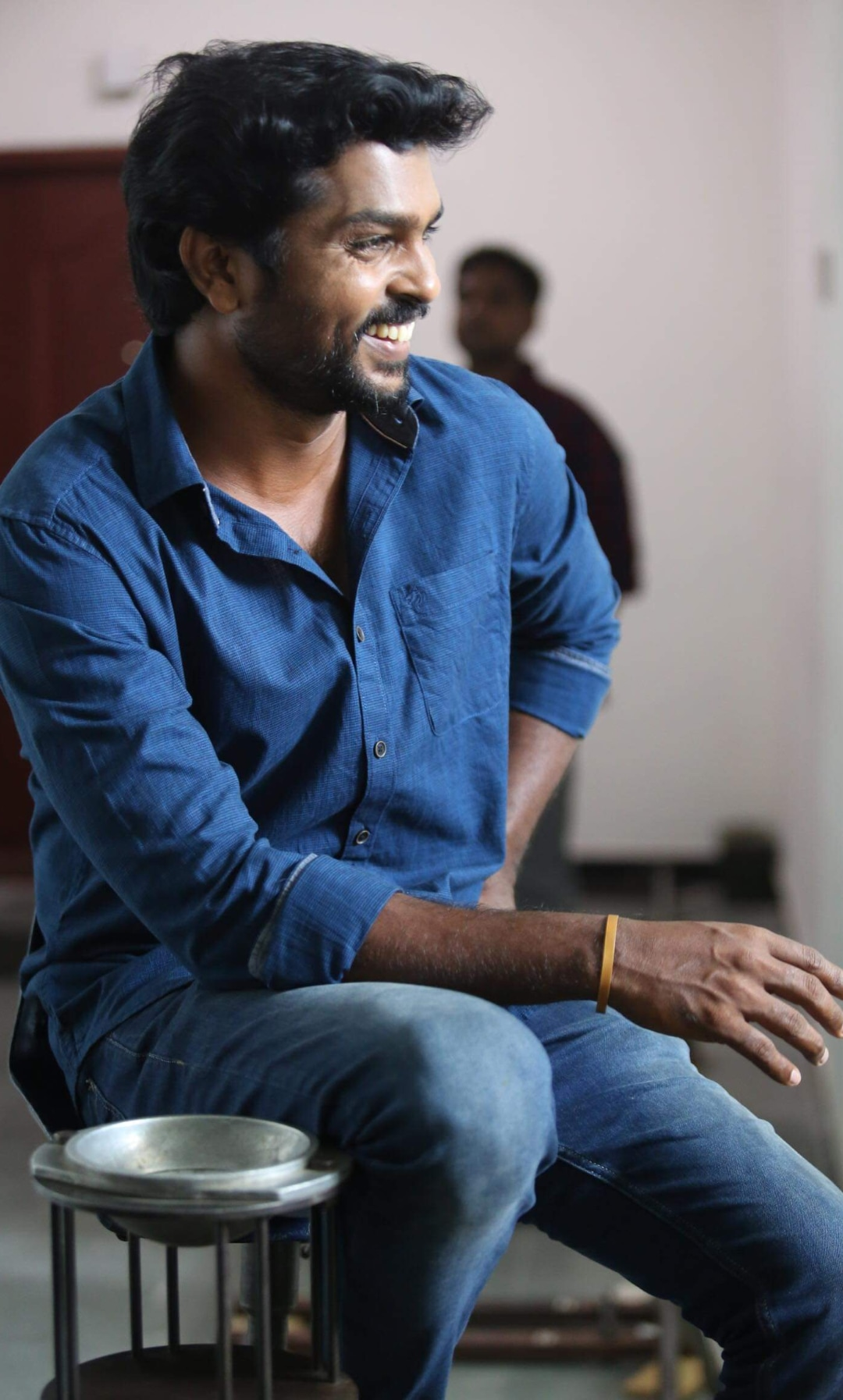
- Born: Chennai, Tamil Nadu
- Occupation: Actor
- Years active: 2016–present

R. S. Karthiik is an Indian actor who has appeared in Tamil language films. After making his film debut in the Tamil film Achcham Yenbadhu Madamaiyada (2016), he has been in films including Maanagaram (2017), Peechankai (2017), Yennanga Sir Unga Sattam (2021) Parole (2022) and Aaryamala (2024)

== Career ==
Karthiik made his acting debut in a minor role in Gautham Vasudev Menon's Achcham Yenbadhu Madamaiyada (2016), before appearing in a supporting role in Lokesh Kanagaraj's Maanagaram (2017). Karthiik's first lead role was in Peechankai (2017), a black comedy about an individual with alien hand syndrome, which he co-produced. The film had earlier been made by the same team as a telefilm, with the director choosing to retain Karthiik in the lead role. The film won positive reviews from critics but had little impact at the Chennai box office. The film however won Karthiik attention from new filmmakers, leading to four other film offers. During mid-2018 and 2019, he worked extensively on the production of a film on illegal racing co-starring Sachin Mani and a film on koothu co-starring Manishajith, but both of the film did not have a theatrical release.

Karthiik next appeared in the political satire film, Yennanga Sir Unga Sattam (2021), where he portrayed two different roles. The film opened to mixed reviews from critics. In 2022, Karthiik played the lead role in Dwarakh Raja's crime thriller Parole (2022).

== Filmography ==
Year	Film	Role	Notes
2016	Achcham Yenbadhu Madamaiyada	Auto Selvam	
2016	Sahasam Swasaga Sagipo	Auto Selvam	Telugu film
2017	Maanagaram	Jeeva's friend	
2017	Peechankai	S. Muthu	Also co-producer
2021	Yennanga Sir Unga Sattam	JP	
2022	Parole	Kovalan	
2024	Aaryamala	Ilango (Kaathavaraayan)	
TBA	Kannaal Kaanbadhu Poi	Mannar Mannan	
