= Thiruttu Payale 2 =

2017 Indian film by Susi Ganesan

- Theatrical Release Poster
- Directed by: Susi Ganeshan
- Written by: Susi Ganeshan
- Produced by: Kalpathi S. Aghoram; Kalpathi S. Ganesh; Kalpathi S. Suresh
- Starring: Bobby Simha; Prasanna; Amala Paul
- Narrated by: Vijay Sethupathi
- Cinematography: P. Chelladurai
- Edited by: Raja Mohammad
- Music by: Vidyasagar
- Production company: AGS Entertainment
- Release date: 30 November 2017
- Country: India
- Language: Tamil

Thiruttu Payale 2 is a 2017 Indian Tamil-language crime thriller film directed and written by Susi Ganesan. A spiritual successor to his earlier Thiruttu Payale (2006), the film stars Bobby Simha, Prasanna and Amala Paul. It features music composed by Vidyasagar, while Raja Mohammad was the editor. Produced by AGS Entertainment, the venture began production in October 2016 and was released on 30 November 2017.

The film was remade in Kannada in 2021 as 100 and in Hindi in 2024 as Ghuspaithiya. Prasanna won the Filmfare Award for Best Supporting Actor – Tamil for his performance, while Amala Paul was nominated for the Filmfare Award for Best Actress – Tamil.

== Plot ==
Selvam (Bobby Simha) is an honest police officer. His senior, O. Nagarajan, assigns him an unofficial task: tapping the phones of several VIPs, who are Nagarajan's political rivals, in hopes of finding scandals to bring them down. Over time, Selvam becomes corrupt. He begins using his position to tap the phones of other VIPs, extorting large sums of money.

One day, while monitoring the phone of a VIP's wife, Selvam discovers she is having an affair with her Facebook friend. Out of curiosity, he taps the man's phone as well—only to be shocked when he learns that his own wife, Agalya (Amala Paul), who is addicted to Facebook, is also seemingly involved with the same man. Enraged but afraid that revealing his surveillance would destroy their marriage, Selvam continues spying on Agalya and her supposed lover.

With the help of private detective Ganesh (Susi Ganeshan), Selvam identifies the man as Balakrishnan, or Balki (Prasanna). A former computer engineer, Balki now targets married women on Facebook. He carefully studies each victim, pretends to be their ideal partner, and lures them into relationships. Once they are trapped, he demands money and sex. Many women who took him seriously even tried to divorce their husbands for him, only to be abandoned—some later committing suicide.

Determined to protect his wife, Selvam hires thugs to rough up Balki, warning him to stay away from Agalya. But Balki persists, continuing to contact her. Furious, Selvam personally confronts Balki, beats him, arrests him, and threatens to kill him. Balki then reveals that after Selvam's men assaulted him, he hacked into Selvam's computer and uncovered all of his secrets—illegal surveillance of VIPs and his ransom earnings. Balki threatens to expose everything, forcing Selvam to release him.

Meanwhile, Agalya confides in her friend Mathy (Soundararaja), unaware that Selvam is tapping the call. She reveals she never had an affair with Balki—she only saw him as a friend. When Balki began crossing boundaries, she blocked him, but he retaliated by threatening to leak their chats out of context to ruin her reputation. Now demanding sex, Balki pressures Agalya to meet him at his house. Reluctantly, she agrees, but asks Mathy to wait outside and intervene if she doesn't emerge within five minutes. Balki indeed tries to force himself on her, but Mathy rescues her just in time.

When Selvam learns what happened, he is enraged and vows to kill Balki. But Balki shows him a secret shower video of Agalya, captured with a hidden camera inside a gift he gave her. He threatens to release it if Selvam harms him. Helpless again, Selvam retreats. Later, he sneaks into Balki's house to delete the video but fails. Balki, provoked, demands Selvam divorce Agalya.

Desperate, Selvam takes leave from work and takes Agalya abroad. There, he proposes resigning from the police force and buying the resort where they are staying so they can settle there. Agalya agrees. But Balki calls, demanding Selvam's decision. Pretending to accept, Selvam lures Balki to the resort.

While Selvam is away, Balki tries to assault Agalya—but suddenly collapses. A flashback reveals Selvam had informed Balki's estranged father about his son's crimes. The father, siding with Selvam, secretly poisoned Balki's food over time, leaving him near-vegetative. Selvam arrives, uses Balki's biometric data to access his online archive of blackmail material, and deletes everything. He then returns the incapacitated Balki to his father.

Selvam reconciles with Agalya, each silently aware of the other's ordeal but choosing to keep it unspoken. Back in India, however, Selvam learns that his accomplice who managed his laundered money has died—leaving him with no access to his illicit fortune and shattering his dreams of a peaceful new life with Agalya abroad.

== Cast ==
- Bobby Simha as Selvam, a corrupt police inspector
- Prasanna as Balakrishnan (Balki), a sociopath who seduces women
- Amala Paul as Agalya Selvam, a college student and Selvam's wife
- Susi Ganeshan as Detective Ganesh
- Soundararaja as Mathy
- M. S. Bhaskar
- Muthuraman as O. Nagarajan IPS
- Pradeep K. Vijayan as Jashwant Seth, Selvam's Benami
- Shyam Prasad as HTV Employee
- Jegannath Nambi as News Channel Debate Host
- Shalu Shamu as Anitha
- P. V. Chandramouli
- Thameem Ansari
- Nayana
- Ananth
- R. K. Mohideen

== Production ==
Director Susi Ganeshan received the advance for this film before the release of Kanthaswamy (2009). In April 2016, AGS Entertainment announced that they would team up with Ganeshan for a sequel to their 2006 film, Thiruttu Payale. Early reports suggested that either Jeevan, Prasanna or Nakul would play the lead role. Consequently, in August 2016, Bobby Simha was revealed as the lead actor, while Prasanna was signed on to play the antagonist, thus teaming up with the director for the second time after 14 years. He had earlier made his debut with the movie Five Star, which released in 2002, which was also the director's debut film. Amala Paul was signed on to play the film's lead actress, while comedians Vivek and Robo Shankar were reportedly signed on for supporting roles. Eventually, Vivek nor Robo Shankar were seen in the film. Likewise Sanam Shetty briefly signed on to portray a detective, but was later replaced by Nayana. The film began production during November 2016, following a launch ceremony, with the shoot progressing in Chennai and Thailand.

== Music ==
Thiruttu Payale 2

Soundtrack album by Vidyasagar
- Released: 1 September 2017
- Recorded: 2016–2017
- Studio: Varsha Vallaki Studios
- Genre: Feature film soundtrack
- Length: 16:05
- Label: Lahari Music; T-Series
- Producer: Vidyasagar

Vidyasagar chronology
Jomonte Suvisheshangal (2016)	Thiruttu Payale 2 (2017)	Aaruthra (2018)

The soundtrack album of Thiruttu Payale 2 composed by Vidyasagar was launched at an open event held on 1 September 2017, at Forum Vijaya Mall in Chennai which was telecasted live on Thanthi TV the very same day. The album features four songs and were penned by Pa. Vijay, and Vidyasagar also sung the title track of the film. The album received mixed reviews from critics, however "Nee Parkkum" which was sung by Sathyaprakash was praised, but the other songs were criticised. The song is a love based melodious number with a beautiful tune, and a pleasant number with instruments like harmonica, keys and sarangi used.

Behindwoods rated the album 2.5 out of 5 stating that "A typical melody based album by Vidyasagar for Thiruttu Payale 2!" Moviecrow rated the album 2.75 out of 5, stating "Vidyasagar's quality melodies continue to work effectually for this sequel and it's baffling that this composer is less in action nowadays."

In a positive note, Sharanya CR, writing for The Times of India in her review stated "Nee Paarkum" as "a lilting song, with soothing guitar portions in the background". The theme song of Thiruttuppayale — 2, "has a jazzy feel, with use of thavil beats and harmonica adds a different layer to the song." Then she stated "Achukku Buchukku" as "a passable listen" reserved only for theatres. And for the final track "Neenda Naal" as a "melodious one". In her bottomline she stated "It is great to have Vidyasagar back after a long hiatus!"

All lyrics are written by Pa. Vijay.

No.	Title	Singer(s)	Length
1.	"Nee Parkkum"	Sathyaprakash	4:11
2.	"Thiruttupayale" (Title Track)	Vidyasagar	3:54
3.	"Achukku Buchukku"	Sanjana Kalmanje	4:00
4.	"Neenda Naal"	Swetha Mohan, Karthik	3:57
Total length:			16:05

== Reception ==
A critic from The Times of India rated the film two-and-half out of five stars and wrote that "Through Thiruttu Payale, Susi intends to convey that everyone lies or pretends in one or the other way, based on the situations they encounter. The premise and characters were attention-grabbing, though there were flaws with regard to its pace". Sowmya Rajendran from The News Minute wrote that "The non-linear plot keeps our interest in the mind games that the characters play but the choppy editing makes the screenplay look disjointed".

== Awards and nominations ==
Award	Date of ceremony	Category	Recipient(s) and nominee(s)	Result	Ref.
Filmfare Awards South	4 June 2018	Best Actress	Amala Paul	Nominated	
Filmfare Awards South	4 June 2018	Best Supporting Actor	Prasanna	Won	
Filmfare Awards South	4 June 2018	Best Male Playback Singer	Sathyaprakash "Nee Parkum"	Nominated	
