= Nandhi (2011 film) =

- Directed by: Tamilvannan
- Written by: Tamilvannan
- Produced by: Dinesh Karthick
- Starring: Akhil; Sanusha
- Cinematography: M. P. Ratheesh
- Edited by: V. T. Vijayan
- Music by: Bharadwaj
- Production company: Vision x Media
- Release date: 11 February 2011
- Country: India
- Language: Tamil

Nandhi is a 2011 Indian Tamil-language film written and directed by Tamilvannan and produced by Dinesh Karthik. The film stars Akhil, Sanusha, and Singampuli. The music was composed by Bharadwaj with editing by V. T. Vijayan and cinematography by M. P. Ratheesh. The film was released on 11 February 2011.

== Plot ==
Pazhani swears he'll reclaim his beloved cow, which his father sold to make ends meet. Meanwhile, he also develops feelings for Karthika. However, the presence of Selvaraj causes issues for him in his romantic life.

== Cast ==
- Akhil as Pazhani
- Sanusha as Karthika
- Nitish Veera as Guna
- Singampuli
- K. G. Mohan
- Rajendranath
- S. Lalitha
- Arul

== Soundtrack ==
Director Tamilvannan worked with composer Yuvan Shankar Raja for his first two films, Kalvanin Kadhali and Machakaaran, which were hits. For Nandhi, however, the music director was Bharadwaj.

All lyrics are written by Muthu Vijayan.

Track listing
| No. | Title | Singer(s) | Length |
|---|---|---|---|
| 1. | "Idhuthaan Kaathal Enbatha" | Hariharan | 5:38 |
| 2. | "Idhuthaan Kaathal Enbatha" | Prasanna | 5:36 |
| 3. | "Mayanginen Mayanginen" | Mukesh, Priyadarshini | 4:17 |
| 4. | "Sanguchakkara Saami" | Chinnaponnu, Rajamani | 4:17 |
| 5. | "Tanjore Thavil" | Mukesh, Ananthu, M. L. R. Karthikeyan, Bharadwaj, Surmukhi Raman, Karpagam | 4:15 |
| 6. | "Thannikulla Thee Pidichathennavo" | Karthik, Janani Bharadwaj | 4:37 |
| Total length: | | | 34:05 |

== Reception ==
Behindwoods wrote, "Nandhi is just another village love story that does not stand out for any of its aspects". Kungumam reviewed the film more positively for Mohan's performance, Singampuli's comedy and Bharadwaj's music.
