= Thiruttu Payale =

2006 film by Susi Ganeshan

- DVD cover
- Directed by: Susi Ganesan
- Written by: Susi Ganesan
- Produced by: Kalpathi S. Aghoram; Kalpathi S. Ganesh; Kalpathi S. Suresh
- Starring: Jeevan; Abbas; Sonia Agarwal; Malavika; Vivek
- Cinematography: Ravishankar
- Music by: Bharadwaj
- Production company: AGS Entertainment
- Release date: 14 April 2006
- Running time: 150 minutes
- Country: India
- Language: Tamil

Thiruttu Payale (transl. Naughty thief) is a 2006 Indian Tamil-language black comedy thriller film written and directed by Susi Ganesan. The film stars Jeevan and Sonia Agarwal in the lead roles, with Abbas, Malavika, Vivek, Manoj K. Jayan, Charle and Gaayathri in supporting roles. The music was composed by Bharadwaj. Thiruttu Payale was released on 14 April 2006, and became a box office success. The film was remade in Hindi by the same director as Shortcut Romeo (2013). The film was also remade in Telugu and Kannada as Mr. Rascal and Aadu Aata Aadu respectively. A spiritual successor Thiruttu Payale 2 was released in 2017.

== Plot ==
Manickam belongs to a poor family in a village. He does not respect any of his family members, except for his uncle Manohar, who lives in Chennai. The story gets rolling once he decides to come and stay with Manohar in Chennai. Once, while Manickam is watching people play golf, he notices Roopini and Ramesh having an illicit relationship. He manages to capture the scene with his video camera. Roopini is married to a rich businessman named Sivaraj, who is Ramesh's best friend. Manickam blackmails Roopini and extracts money from her whenever he needs it. Taking a trip to Australia with money extracted from Roopini, he meets and falls in love with Rosy. Rosy tells him that she is a very rich girl from a respected family. While he decides to propose to her, he finds that she has left the city. Just then, Roopini calls him on the phone and tells him that Rosy was sent by her only to woo Manickam and demands that if he needs Rosy, he needs to hand over the cassette to her. Manickam decides to find Rosy and learns that she also loves him. She asks him to leave this con work and gets him a job in a shop. All goes well until Rosy's stepmother learns about this relationship and asks Manickam for a sum if he wants to marry Rosy. To acquire the same, he again uses the cassette one final time, but Sivaraj learns about it. Manickam hands over the money to Rosy's stepmother and asks Rosy to come to the airport the next day. The climax shows Sivaraj killing Ramesh, and Manickam fighting the goons sent by Sivaraj and reaching the airport, somehow only to be stabbed by Sivaraj. The film ends with Rosy waiting for Manickam at the airport.

== Cast ==
- Jeevan as Manickam
- Abbas as Ramesh
- Sonia Agarwal as Saranya (Rosy)
- Malavika as Roopini
- Vivek as Yoharaja
- Manoj K. Jayan as Sivaraj (Roopini's husband)
- Charle as Watchman
- Vinod Raj as Manohar (Manickam's uncle)
- Gaayathri as Saranya's mother
- Susi Ganesan as CID

== Production ==
Ganesan initially wanted to make Thiruttu Payale a low budget film with newcomers like his directorial debut Five Star, but at the urging of the producer Kalpathi S. Aghoram, he increased its scale. Ganesan wanted P. C. Sreeram to handle the cinematography but due to date issues, Sreeram recommended his assistant Ravishankar as the cinematographer thus making his debut.

== Soundtrack ==
The music was composed by Bharadwaj. The title song "Thiruttu Payale" is partially based on "Chinna Payale" from Arasilankumari (1961). The song "Thaiya Tha" is based on Charukesi raga.

All lyrics are written by Vairamuthu.

Track listing
No.	Title	Singer(s)	Length
1.	"Avala Partha"	Karthik, Donal Arjun, Bharadwaj	4:48
2.	"Poi Solla Poren"	KK, Kanmani	5:25
3.	"Thayyatha"	Sadhana Sargam, Reshmi, Amalraj	4:58
4.	"Theme"	Swetha	0:49
5.	"Thippamma"	Bharadwaj, Sudesh Bhosle, Rajagopal	4:28
6.	"Thiruttu Payale"	Mukesh Mohamed	3:51
Total length:			24:19

== Reception ==
S. Sudha of Rediff.com gave the film a rating of two out of five stars and said "Susi Ganesan must be credited for tackling a bold subject. A film for the multiplexes, this". Lajjavathi of Kalki praised director for giving an edge of seat thriller, Jeevan's acting and concluded saying Thiruttu Payale is a quality dish for fans of all walks of life who are looking to elevate their taste buds. Malini Mannath of Chennai Online wrote, "Thiruttu Payale is an engaging entertainer, different from the routine ones Tamil audiences are used to, and reveals Susi Ganesan as a maker who can handle varied genres with equal flare and competence". The film won the Tamil Nadu State Film Award for Third Best Film.

== Box office ==
The film was a commercial success grossing ₹ 400 million at the box office and became the third highest grossing Tamil film of 2006 only behind Varalaru and Vettaiyaadu Vilaiyaadu.

== Sequel and remakes ==
The film was remade in Hindi by the director himself as Shortcut Romeo (2013). The film was also remade in Telugu and Kannada as Mr. Rascal (2011) and Aadu Aata Aadu (2017), respectively. A spiritual successor Thiruttu Payale 2 was released in 2017.
