= Susi Ganeshan =

Indian film director and producer

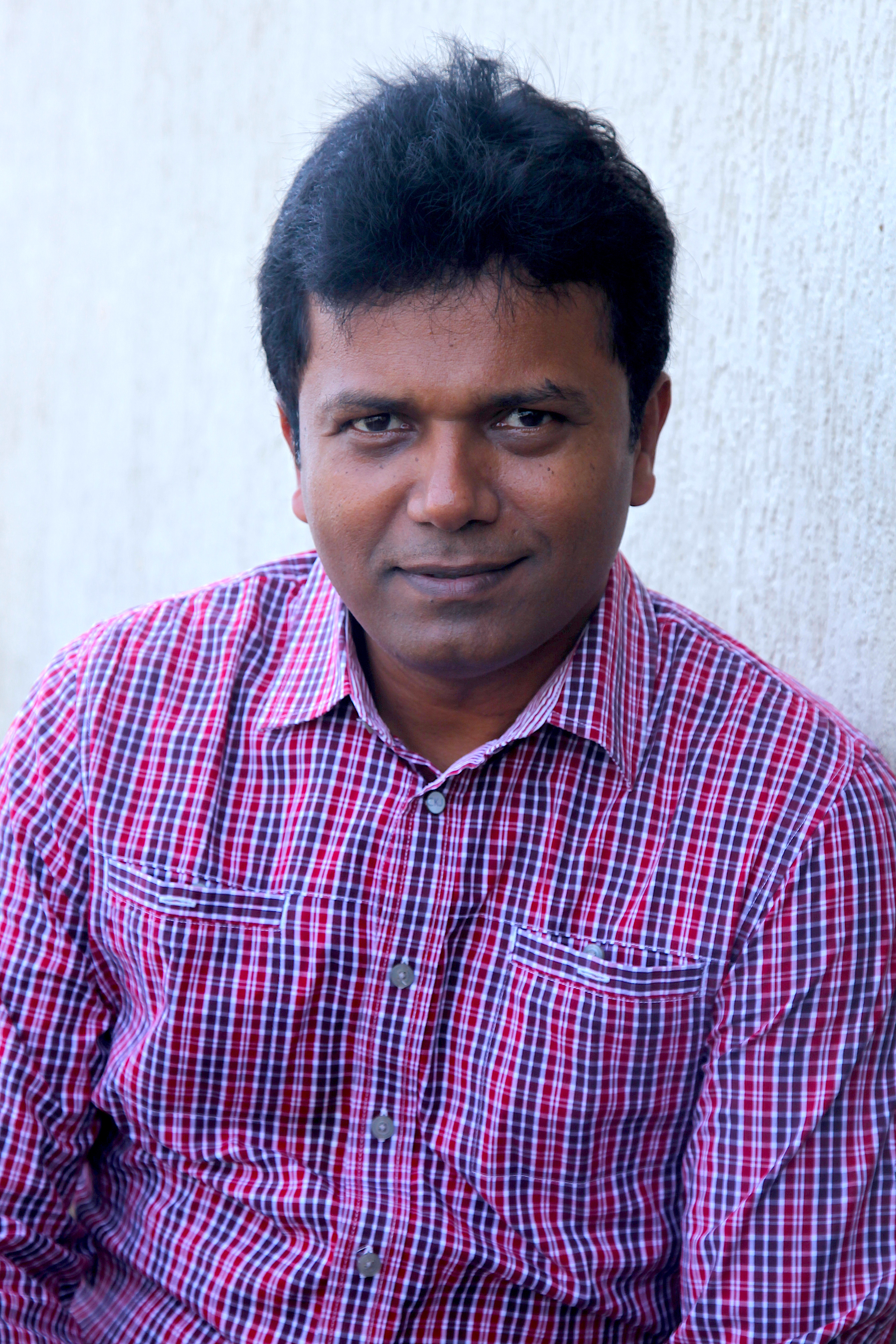
- Born: Ganesan Subbiah; 25 August 1969 (age 57); Vannivelampatti, Madurai, Tamil Nadu, India
- Years active: 2002–present
- Spouse: Manjari Susiganesan (m. 2004)
- Children: 2
- Website: www.susiganesan.com

Ganesan Subbiah (born 25 August 1969), popularly known as Susi Ganeshan, is an Indian film director, producer, and writer who predominantly works in Tamil films apart from a few Hindi remakes of his own films.

== Early life ==
Ganesan was born on (25 August 1969) Vannivelampatti, Madurai District in Tamil Nadu. He changed his screen name to Susi Ganeshan, his first name being from the first two letters from his parents' first names. He attended Gandhi Nikethan higher secondary school in T. Kallupatti and also graduated from Madras Institute of Technology with a bachelor's degree in automobile engineering.

During his college days, he was a journalist, writing many articles for the Tamil magazine Ananda Vikatan. He was also chairman of ATHENAEUM, the student body of the Madras Institute of Technology, during 1991–92. After working as an assistant to director Mani Ratnam during the filming of Bombay (1995), Iruvar (1997) and Dil Se.. (1998), Ganeshan debuted as a director with the 2002 film Virumbukiren.

== Career ==
His first film, Virumbukiren, was initially titled Thithikkum Thee and was to feature Murali in the lead role of a firefighter, but later Prashanth was finalized for the lead role. The project, which also marked the debut of actress Sneha, went through production troubles and released nearly two years after the launch, becoming Ganeshan's second release. The film received four awards at the 2001 Tamil Nadu State Film Awards, winning the Best Director, Best Actress and Best Supporting Actress prizes, while also being adjudged as the Best Film of the year.

Ganeshan then made Five Star (2002), which happened to be his first release, due to the delay of his first project Virumbukiren. Five Star, produced by his mentor Mani Ratnam under the banner Madras Talkies, featured five newcomers in the title roles. The story focused on friendship, love with social awareness and a touch of human emotions. The film won him the Tamil Nadu State Film Award for Best Storywriter. He then launched a film titled Sakkarai with Prashanth and Reemma Sen in the lead roles in October 2004, but the film was subsequently postponed then shelved.

In 2006, Ganeshan made his third film Thiruttu Payale. The film, which featured Jeevan, Sonia Agarwal and Malavika in principal roles, emerged a sleeper hit and ranked among the highest-grossing Tamil films of the year. It was named the third Best Film of the year by the Tamil Nadu State Government and gave major breaks to the leading actors, with the performances of Jeevan and Malavika, in particular, being considerably appreciated. Then, Ganeshan directed Kanthaswamy. The film dealt with the disparity of rich and poor in Indian society, and it was reportedly the first South Indian film in that the protagonist, portrayed by Vikram, conceived a superhero character. The film had the biggest opening in the year 2009.

Ganeshan's next directed and produced the Hindi film, Shortcut Romeo (2013), a remake of his 2006 film Thiruttu Payale starring Neil Nitin Mukesh and Puja Gupta.

After a long break from the Tamil film Industry, Susi Ganeshan returned with a sequel to his film Thiruttu Payale. Thiruttu Payale 2 featured Bobby Simha, Prasanna and Amala Paul in lead roles. The movie was released in Nov 2017 and made an average collection.

In 2018, Ganeshan was accused by filmmaker Leena Manimekalai during the MeToo movement in India. Her accusation was supported by Amala Paul, whom Ganesan had worked with, in Thiruttu Payale 2. In response, Ganesan filed a defamation suit against Manimekalai at the Saidapet Magistrate Court.

== Awards ==
Year	Film	Award
2001	Virumbukiren	Won, Tamil Nadu State Film Award for Best Film Director & Best Film
2002	Five Star	Won, Tamil Nadu State Film Award for Best Storywriter
2006	Thiruttu Payale	Won, Tamil Nadu State Film Award for Best Film
2009	Kanthaswamy	Nominated, Vijay Award for Favourite Director

== Filmography ==
=== As director ===
Year	Film	Language	Notes
2002	Five Star	Tamil	Winner, Tamil Nadu State Film Award for Best Storywriter
2002	Virumbukiren	Tamil	Winner, Tamil Nadu State Film Award for Best Film; Winner, Tamil Nadu State Film Award for Best Director
2006	Thiruttu Payale	Tamil	Winner, Tamil Nadu State Film Award for Third Best Film
2009	Kanthaswamy	Tamil	Nominated, Vijay Award for Favourite Director
2013	Shortcut Romeo	Hindi	credited as Susi Ganesh; Also producer Remake of Thiruttu Payale
2017	Thiruttu Payale 2	Tamil	
2024	Ghuspaithiya	Hindi	Remake of Thiruttu Payale 2

=== As actor ===
Year	Film	Role	Language	Notes
2006	Thiruttu Payale	CID	Tamil	
2009	Kanthaswamy	Ganesh IPS	Tamil	
2013	Shortcut Romeo	Detective Agent	Hindi	
2017	Thiruttu Payale 2	Detective Ganesh	Tamil	
2024	Ghuspaithiya	DIG Ajay Yadav	Hindi	
