= Kaakha Kaakha =

2003 Indian film by Gautham Vasudev Menon

- Film poster
- Directed by: Gautham Vasudev Menon
- Written by: Gautham Vasudev Menon
- Produced by: Kalaipuli S. Thanu
- Starring: Suriya; Jyothika; Jeevan
- Cinematography: R. D. Rajasekhar
- Edited by: Anthony
- Music by: Harris Jayaraj
- Production company: V Creations
- Release date: 1 August 2003
- Running time: 153 minutes
- Country: India
- Language: Tamil

Kaakha Kaakha (transl. Protect, protect) is a 2003 Indian Tamil-language action thriller film written and directed by Gautham Vasudev Menon and produced by Kalaipuli S. Thanu. The film stars Suriya, Jyothika and Jeevan, with Daniel Balaji, Vivek Anand, Devadarshini, Sethu Rajan and Yog Japee in supporting roles. It follows a unit of police officers whose lives are threatened by a gangster whose brother they had previously killed.

The music of Kaakha Kaakha was composed by Harris Jayaraj, while cinematography was handled by R. D. Rajasekhar and Anthony made his debut as editor. The film was released on 1 August 2003 and became a commercial success, winning four Filmfare Awards South, two Tamil Nadu State Film Awards and three ITFA Awards. It was considered a breakthrough for Menon, Suriya and Jeevan. The film was remade in Telugu as Gharshana (2004) by Menon, in Hindi as Force and in Kannada as Dandam Dashagunam (both 2011).

== Plot ==
Anbuselvan, an orphan and an honest, stern assistant commissioner of police in the Chennai City Police Crime Branch, serves in a special unit alongside his colleagues Shrikanth, Arul, and Ilamaran. The squad takes a ruthless approach to tackling organised crime in Chennai, Tamil Nadu, routinely carrying out encounter killings. However, after killing five gang members in three months, the unit is disbanded by human rights authorities, and Anbuselvan is assigned to control room duties.

During this period, Anbuselvan meets Maya, a schoolteacher, after she rebuffs his routine safety queries. They meet again when Maya is stopped for driving without a licence, though Anbuselvan lets her off with a warning. When Maya seeks his help regarding a dispute involving her students, Anbuselvan resolves the issue, leading to mutual respect and daily interactions. After assisting her recovery from a road accident, the two fall in love, while Maya becomes close friends with Shrikanth and his wife, Swathi.

Concurrently, Agaram Sethu, an escaped gangster, reunites with his estranged brother Pandiya, who returns to Chennai 14 years of criminal activity in Maharashtra. Pandiya operates by murdering a target's family member while leaving the target alive to suffer the psychological aftermath. Under Pandiya's guidance, Sethu's gang executes major kidnappings across the city. Recognising the threat, the police commissioner reassembles the special unit. During an operation in a railyard, the unit tracks down and kills Sethu, though Pandiya and other gang members escape.

Pandiya assumes control of the syndicate, vowing revenge against the squad. After murdering the family of business partner Vasu Seth, Pandiya informs Anbuselvan that he intends to kidnap Maya. Anbuselvan tracks down Pandiya and wounds him, but Pandiya escapes and assassinates Ilamaran that night. The police department mobilises to place the officers' families in hiding. Anbuselvan and Maya marry in haste and relocate to a cottage in Pondicherry. However, Pandiya tracks them down, disables Anbuselvan by swapping his firearm magazine with an empty one, kidnaps Maya, and leaves Anbuselvan severely injured. (Note: Footage of Anbuselvan being shot appears at the beginning, in medias res.)

Shrikanth and Arul rescue the wounded Anbuselvan and admit him to a hospital. Upon recovering, Anbuselvan learns that Swathi had been kidnapped earlier and that Shrikanth compromised Anbuselvan's location and firearm under distress. His team receives a location protocol from Pandiya in Andhra Pradesh. Upon arrival, they find packages containing Swathi's severed head and a severed part of Maya's body. Overcome with grief and remorse, Shrikanth commits suicide.

Anbuselvan and Arun track down Pandiya before he can flee Tamil Nadu. During the ensuing confrontation, Pandiya uses Maya as a human shield and fatally shoots her before Anbuselvan can react. Enraged, Anbuselvan kills Pandiya and eliminates the remaining gang members. In the aftermath, Anbuselvan pays his respects to Maya as he leaves for work.

== Cast ==
- Suriya as ACP Anbuselvan
- Jyothika as Maya
- Jeevan as Pandiya
- Daniel Balaji as Shrikanth
- Vivek Anand as Arul
- Devadarshini as Swathi
- Sethu Rajan as Ilamaran
- Yog Japee as Agaram Sethu
- Ramya Krishnan (special appearance in the song "Thoodhu Varumaa")
- Pondy Ravi as Constable Kaththa Muthu
- Birla Bose as ACP Kumaravel
- Cool Suresh as a rogue
- Sathyaraj as the narrator in the ending (Note: credited as Special Thanks)

Uncredited

- Manobala as Ramana
- Rajeevan as Maya's brother-in-law
- Gautham Vasudev Menon as Vasudevan Nair
- R. D. Rajasekhar (special appearance in the song "Oru Ooril")

== Production ==
=== Development ===
Gautham Vasudev Menon revealed that he was inspired to make Kaakha Kaakha after reading articles about encounter specialists. The film was initially titled Paathi (transl. Half), and then Kalam (transl. Field) before the team opted for Kaakha Kaakha, a line from Kanda Shasti Kavasam, a devotional song. Many producers refused to finance the film as they could not agree on the budget fixed by Menon; it was Kalaipuli S. Thanu who finally did so. Cinematography was handled by R. D. Rajasekhar and art direction by Rajeevan. Anthony made his debut as editor.

=== Casting ===
Jyothika was cast as the lead actress even before the lead actor had been finalised. Menon approached R. Madhavan for that role, but the actor felt he could not convincingly play an encounter specialist. Ajith Kumar and Vikram were also approached, but were reluctant to play a police officer at the time. Vijay declined as he wanted a complete script, whereas Menon decided to finalise the climax only during filming. Jyothika asked Menon to consider Suriya for the role, and he was selected after Menon saw his portrayal in Nandhaa (2001). Jeevan was cast as the antagonist after Menon saw him on a poster of University (2002), the actor's debut. His voice was dubbed by Menon. Ramya Krishnan agreed to do an item number, at a time she believed no leading actress would agree to do so. Vincent Asokan auditioned for the role of a police officer and participated in a photo shoot.

=== Filming ===
Menon did a rehearsal of the script with the actors, a costume trial with Jyothika and then enrolled Suriya in a commando training school before beginning production, which he described as a "very planned shoot". To prepare for the role, Suriya met two actual police officers Vijayakumar and Shailendra Babu who discussed their encounter experiences. An outhouse set was built at Nuwara Eliya at Sri Lanka which cost ₹5 lakh (equivalent to ₹20 lakh or US$21,000 in 2026). To build the set on 24 feet of water, Rajeevan hired thirteen carpenters, two painters and the set was built within 15 days and the green-grass roof of the house had to be watered every day to prevent the grass from drying up. Suriya performed the scene where his character falls from the outhouse without a stunt double. The song "Uyirin Uyire" was shot at Andaman.

=== Post-production ===
Anthony was initially hired to edit only the song "Ennai Konjam" for the film's audio launch. After being impressed with his work, Menon made him the film's main editor. It was also Anthony's idea to begin the film in a nonlinear manner; the scene of the lead character being shot was originally intended as "pre-climax" before it became the opening scene. Thanu noted that including Anthony's name in the credits was initially disallowed as he was not a member of the Southern India Film Editors Association, so he fought to get Anthony membership there.

== Soundtrack ==
The music was composed by Harris Jayaraj, with lyrics by Thamarai. The song "Ondra Renda" is based on "Dil Ko Tumse Pyar Hua" from the 2001 Hindi film Rehnaa Hai Terre Dil Mein in which Harris himself was the music composer. While writing the song "Oru Ooril", Thamarai wanted to highlight a woman's personality over her appearance.

Track listing
| No. | Title | Singer(s) | Length |
|---|---|---|---|
| 1. | "Ennai Konjam" | Timmy, Tippu, Pop Shalini | 4:57 |
| 2. | "Ondra Renda" | Bombay Jayashri | 5:07 |
| 3. | "Oru Ooril" | Karthik | 4:50 |
| 4. | "Thoodhu Varuma" | Sunitha Sarathy, Febi Mani | 4:42 |
| 5. | "Uyirin Uyirae" | KK, Suchitra | 5:22 |
| Total length: | | | 25:48 |

== Release ==
Kaakha Kaakha was cleared with a U/A certificate by the censor board with no cuts. The film was released in theatres on 1 August 2003. It was released in the United Kingdom under the title The Police. The film emerged a commercial success, running for over 100 days in theatres. It had an alternate ending which showed Jyothika's character surviving, but was released only on DVD as an extra.

=== Critical response ===
Guru Subramaniam of Rediff.com labelled Kaakha Kaakha a "career high film" and wrote, "Though the director is a tad biased while describing the police, one must salute his positive attitude." Malathi Rangarajan of The Hindu described the film as being for "action lovers who believe in logical storylines and deft treatment." Cinesouth wrote, "Goutham has made an action film without getting caught in the masala trap. Appreciated!".

Ananda Vikatan rated the film 41 out of 100, praising Suriya and Jyothika's performances and Menon's direction, saying the director proved that Ram Gopal Varma-type films could be made even in Tamil. Visual Dasan of Kalki praised the acting, police research, music, direction and climax. Sify wrote, "Gautam Menon has once again asserted that he is a path breaking writer-cum-director who has his viewers adrenalin pumping with his engrossing crime drama Kaakha Kaakha", adding that the film "packs in quite a solid punch as it overflows with sharp dialogues and operatic violence. Moreover an exceptional ensemble cast does full justice to this stylised tale of love and death".

=== Accolades ===
| Award | Category | Recipient | Ref. |
|---|---|---|---|
| 51st Filmfare Awards South | Best Villain – Tamil | Jeevan | |
| 51st Filmfare Awards South | Best Choreography | Brindha | |
| 51st Filmfare Awards South | Best Music Director | Harris Jayaraj | |
| 51st Filmfare Awards South | Best Cinematographer | R. D. Rajasekhar | |
| 2003 Tamil Nadu State Film Awards | Best Music Director | Harris Jayaraj | |
| 2003 Tamil Nadu State Film Awards | Best Editor | Anthony | |
| ITFA Awards | Best Actor | Suriya | |
| ITFA Awards | Best Actress – Special Jury | Jyothika | |
| ITFA Awards | Best Music Director | Harris Jayaraj | |

== Remakes ==
Menon remade the film in Telugu as Gharshana (2004). In July 2004, he agreed terms to direct and produce another version of Kaakha Kaakha in Hindi with Sunny Deol in the lead role and revealed that the script was written five years ago with Deol in mind, but the film eventually failed to take off. In 2010, producer Vipul Shah approached Menon to direct the Hindi version Force (2011); he initially agreed before pulling out. The film was also remade in Kannada in 2011 as Dandam Dashagunam. Menon and Thanu floated the idea of an English version with a Chechnyan backdrop, though talks with a potential collaboration with Ashok Amritraj collapsed.

== Legacy ==
Kaakha Kaakha emerged a breakthrough for Menon and Suriya. Thanu considered it his comeback after the failure of Aalavandhan (2001). Jeevan fetched significant attention for his role and more offers to play antagonistic roles but declined as he only favoured leading roles. In 2024, Suriya recalled meeting a District Magistrate in Varanasi who said he was inspired to become an IPS officer after watching Kaakha Kaakha. Though the film attained popularity among Tamil audiences for seemingly romanticising police brutality and vigilantism, as with other contemporaneous Tamil films, Kirubhakar Purushothaman wrote for India Today in 2018 that Tamil filmmakers should "reconsider their idea of vigilante justice that they have been fond of so far", especially after the Thoothukudi protest shooting which resulted in the deaths of 13 civilians. However, in 2020 after the murders of P. Jayaraj and J. Bennix in Sathankulam by police, Menon expressed no regret for making police films, saying he met many police officers who said they were inspired by his films to join the police, adding that police officers who "cross the line" are not as much in number as those who abide by the law.

== Potential sequel ==
In February 2018, Menon revealed his plans of making a sequel to Kaakha Kaakha. In August 2020, he revealed that he had written most of the script, but that Suriya wanted a gap between his police films after the Singam series, so the project was put on hold. In September 2022, Thanu revealed that plans for the film were in place and that he had already paid an advance to Menon for the project.

== Bibliography ==
- Dhananjayan, G. (2011). The Best of Tamil Cinema, 1931 to 2010: 1977–2010. Galatta Media. OCLC 733724281.
