= Vinod Raj (Tamil actor) =

Indian actor

- Born: John Albert Victor c. 1937; Paramakudi, Madras Presidency, British India
- Died: 31 December 2017 (aged 80); Chennai, Tamil Nadu, India
- Occupation: Actor
- Spouse: Rajeshwari
- Children: 3, including Vikram

John Albert Victor (1937 – 31 December 2017), known professionally as Vinod Raj, was an Indian actor, who worked on Tamil films. He is the father of actor Vikram.

== Career ==
Vinod Raj did not experience much personal success as an actor and often appeared in minor supporting roles in films and in television serials. He is best known for his appearance as Trisha's father in Ghilli (2004) and for his role alongside his son in Susi Ganesan's Kanthaswamy (2009).

== Personal life ==
Vinod Raj was born as John Albert Victor in a tamil christian family and was a native of Paramakudi, before running away from home to start a career in films. He was married to Rajeshwari, a sub-collector whose brother, Thyagarajan was an established director-actor in the Tamil film industry; with his son, actor Prashanth, being his nephew. Vinod's son Kennedy, who works with the stage name of Vikram, went from being a struggling actor to one of the leading actors in Tamil cinema after the release of Sethu (1999). Vikram is used as a screen name as he disliked his original name, Kennedy; the name Vikram was composed by taking "Vi" from his father's name, "K" from Kennedy, "Ra" from his mother's name and "ram" from his sun sign, Aries. Vikram's son, Dhruv, is also an actor, marking the third generation of actors in the family. Vinod's younger son, Arvind lives in Dubai, U.A.E. Vinod also has a daughter Anitha, who is a teacher.

== Death ==
Vinod Raj died on 31 December 2017 following a heart attack at his home in Mahalingapuram, Chennai. He was laid to rest at Kilpauk cemetery.

== Notable filmography ==
- Malaiyoor Mambattiyan (1983)
- Kodi Parakkuthu (1988)
- Ghilli (2004)
- Thirupaachi (2005)
- Madrasi (2006)
- Thambi (2006)
- Thiruttu Payale (2006)
- Pachchak Kuthira (2006)
- Manathodu Mazhaikalam (2006)
- Maya Kannadi (2007)
- Machakaaran (2007)
- Satyam (2008)
- Kanthaswamy (2009)
- Agam Puram (2010)
- Aravaan (2012)
