= Tamilvannan =

Indian film director

- Born: Tamilvanan; Elanthangudi, Mayiladuthurai, Tamil Nadu, India
- Occupations: Director, writer, editor
- Years active: 1999 – Present

T. Tamilvannan is an Indian film director in Tamil cinema. His notable movies are Kalvanin Kadhali and Machakaaran.

He started his career as an Assistant Director with the top Tamil industry director Ezhil in the superhit film of actor Vijay - Thullatha Manamum Thullum, followed by the film with actor Prabhu Deva - Pennin Manathai Thottu and continued as co-director in the film of actor Ajith Kumar - Poovellam Un Vasam and Raja. His Directorial debut film was Kalvanin Kadhali acted by the actor S. J. Suryah and the leading star Nayantara which was also a box office hit. He done the second film Machakaran with the actor Jeevan and the third film titled Nandhi.

After a good script work now he has worked on the shelved film starring Amitabh Bachchan and S. J. Suryah titled Uyarntha Manidhan.

== Filmography ==
Year	Film
2006	Kalvanin Kadhali
2007	Machakaaran
2011	Nandhi
TBA	Uyarndha Manithan
