= Shortcut Romeo =

2013 film directed by Susi Ganeshan

- Theatrical release poster
- Directed by: Susi Ganeshan
- Written by: Susi Ganeshan
- Based on: Thiruttu Payale by Susi Ganeshan
- Produced by: Susi Ganeshan Rohandeep singh
- Starring: Neil Nitin Mukesh; Ameesha Patel; Puja Gupta
- Cinematography: N. K. Ekambaram
- Edited by: Dilip Deo; Hardik Singh Reen
- Music by: Himesh Reshammiya
- Production company: Susi Ganesh Productions
- Distributed by: Mirchi Movies; Susi Ganesh Productions
- Release date: 21 June 2013
- Running time: 147 minutes
- Country: India
- Language: Hindi

Shortcut Romeo is a 2013 Indian Hindi-language action crime thriller film directed and produced by Susi Ganeshan, under the banner of Susi Ganesh Productions. It is the remake of the director's own Tamil film Thiruttu Payale (2006). The film stars Neil Nitin Mukesh in the title role, alongside Puja Gupta and Ameesha Patel. The theatrical trailer of Shortcut Romeo was released on 25 January 2013. The film was screened at Marche du Film at Cannes Film Festival on 22 May 2013. It released on 21 June 2013.

== Plot ==
Suraj is a good-for-nothing youth who throws his weight around his house with his violent attitude. One day, in a fit of rage, he injures his younger brother, following which he is sent off from Goa to Mumbai to his uncle's house. Suraj chances upon Monica. She is the wife of a rich man and comes to learn golf, but her coach becomes interested on her and they make love in a golf park. He records this act on a video camera. He then finds out that it is an extramarital affair and that the lovers, Monica and Ashish, are rich. Despite Monica offering large sums of money for the tape, Suraj refuses to part with it. His demand is much greater. He wants an assurance from her that she will provide him with a luxurious life.

Monica has no choice; she succumbs to Suraj's blackmail and Suraj foots his holiday in Kenya along with his friends. Monica tries to outsmart Suraj at every stage. Suraj meets Sherry a rich but lonely girl and falls in love with her. That's when he begins to realize that there are things more important than money in life. The cat and mouse game between Monica and Suraj, and the way one alternately checkmates the other in every round goes on till Rahul, Monica's husband, hires a private detective. Sherry gets caught in this cross-fire. The later part of the story ends with an interesting twist and turns.

== Cast ==
- Neil Nitin Mukesh as Suraj
- Ameesha Patel as Monica
- Puja Gupta as Sherry / Raathikha
- Yogender Kumar as Suraj's best friend
- Rajesh Shringarpure as Rahul
- Jatin Grewal as Ashish
- Susi Ganeshan as Detective Agent (Cameo)
- Errol Marks
- Meherzan Mazda
- Vrajesh Hirjee
- Mumaith Khan
- Bikramjeet Kanwarpal as a Police inspector
- Ashutosh Kaushik
- Himesh Reshammiya in a special appearance in a song

== Production ==
=== Casting ===
Post Kanthaswamy (2009), Susi Ganeshan announced plans to make his debut in Bollywood by remaking his own Tamil film Thiruttu Payale (2006). In September 2011, it was announced that Neil Nitin Mukesh and Ameesha Patel were the finalized as the protagonist and antagonist. The film went on floors in November, with Richa Gangopadhyay playing Mukesh's love interest. However, after differences with the director, she dropped out and the role was offered to Puja Gupta. Once Puja was on board, the film's shooting progressed swiftly. A special song was also shot on the lead pair to music by Himesh Reshammiya.

=== Filming ===
Principal photography started in November 2011. The major portion of the first schedule was filmed mainly in Mumbai and a few other places in India. The second schedule began in January and was filmed in Kenya. The schedule lasted for more than 20 days covering the Masai Mara and a few neighbouring places.

== Soundtrack ==
The soundtrack of the film was composed by Himesh Reshammiya, with the lyrics written by Sameer, Shabbir Ahmed, Manoj Yadav and Sanjay Masoom.

Shortcut Romeo

Soundtrack album by Himesh Reshammiya
- Released: 29 May 2013
- Genre: Film soundtrack
- Label: T-Series
- Producer: Himesh Reshammiya

Himesh Reshammiya chronology
Special Chabbis (2013)	Shortcut Romeo (2013)	Policegiri (2013)

No.	Title	Lyrics	Singer(s)	Length
1.	"Pe Pe Pe (Coca Cola)"	Manoj Yadav	Himesh Reshammiya	4:06
2.	"Khali Salam Dua"	Shabbir Ahmed	Mohit Chauhan	5:10
3.	"Ishq Gangster"	Sameer	Himesh Reshammiya, Vinit Singh	4:40
4.	"Short Cut Romeo"	Sanjay Masoom	Ash King	4:39
5.	"Jave Saari Duniya"	Sameer	Mika Singh	3:30
6.	"Short Cut Romeo" (Reprise)	Sanjay Masoom	Aman Trikha	3:19
7.	"Pe Pe Pe" (Remix)	Manoj Yadav	Himesh Reshammiya	3:50
8.	"Ishq Gangster" (Remix)	Sameer	Himesh Reshammiya, Vinit Singh	3:28
9.	"Shortcut Romeo" (Mashup)	Various	Various	2:37
Total length:				35:22

== Release and reception ==
Shortcut Romeo got a minuscule release by its producer.

Paloma Sharma of Rediff.com wrote that "Well shot, with laudable performances from Neil Nitin Mukesh and Ameesha Patel, Shortcut Romeo makes up for loose ends and bizarre twists in the plot by means of sheer masala power". Taran Adarsh of Bollywood Hungama rated the film three out of five stars and wrote that "On the whole, SHORTCUT ROMEO is a well-made, stylish crime story with high-voltage drama as its highpoint. It may not boast of A-listers in its cast, but it has ample entertainment and edge-of-the-seat moments to offer. I suggest, give this one a chance!" A critic from The Times of India wrote that "Susi Ganesh has attempted to ‘Bollywoodize’ his first Hindi film (remake of Tamil film Thiruttu Payale). Desperately throwing in Munnis, Sheilas & Jalebi bais – of Kenyan origin. There are twists and (blind) turns, over-dramatized scenes with little shock value that’s mostly predictable".
