= Ghuspaithiya =

2024 film by Susi Ganesan

- Theatrical release poster
- Directed by: Susi Ganesan
- Written by: Susi Ganesan
- Based on: Thiruttu Payale 2 (2017) by Susi Ganesan
- Produced by: Ramesh Reddy; Jyotika Shenoy; Manjari Susi Ganesan
- Starring: Vineet Kumar Singh; Urvashi Rautela; Akshay Oberoi
- Cinematography: Sethu Sriram
- Edited by: Ram-Sathiesh
- Music by: Akshay Menon; Sourabh Singh Senger
- Production companies: Suraj Production; 4V Entertainment; JDS Enterprises
- Distributed by: AA Films
- Release dates: 12 September 2023 (TIFF); 9 August 2024 (India)
- Running time: 132 minutes
- Country: India
- Language: Hindi

Ghuspaithiya (transl. The Intruder) is a 2024 Indian Hindi-language crime drama film written and directed by Susi Ganesan. It is a remake of the Tamil film Thiruttu Payale 2 (2017) and stars Vineet Kumar Singh, Urvashi Rautela and Akshay Oberoi.

The film was theatrically released on 9 August 2024.

== Plot ==
The film follows Ravi Rana, a capable police officer who begins his career in the Evangelization Wing of the UP Police with a vow never to take bribes and to remain honest. His resolve falters when he falls in love with Abha (Urvashi Rautela). Abha’s father rejects Ravi’s marriage proposal, fearing his daughter would live in poverty with an honest policeman. Defying him, the two marry, and Ravi gradually succumbs to corruption, taking bribes and misusing his position.

Encouraged by his power-hungry senior, Ravi is assigned to phone tapping, tasked with monitoring the IG and other officers. He revels in the thrill of eavesdropping, until one day he overhears Abha speaking to another man. Shocked, Ravi eventually discovers she is not unfaithful but being blackmailed through compromising MMS clips and call recordings.

The blackmail traces back to Anshuman (Akshay Oberoi), a hacker who exploits women online. Using Facebook to connect with strangers, Abha unknowingly falls into his trap. Anshuman sends her gifts embedded with hidden cameras, recording explicit images and videos to control her.

Ravi’s mission shifts: he must rescue Abha from Anshuman’s clutches and punish the hacker. But the tables turn when Anshuman hacks Ravi’s computer, exposing his own corrupt secrets and threatening to ruin him.

The story builds suspense around whether Ravi can free himself and Abha from this digital nightmare, and how their marriage will endure the storm of betrayal, blackmail, and redemption.

== Cast ==
- Vineet Kumar Singh as Ravi Kumar
- Urvashi Rautela as Abha
- Akshay Oberoi as Anshuman
- Govind Namdev as Santosh Tyagi
- Umesh Shukla as Shamboonath
- Prabhat Kumar Lahiri as Motabhai
- Susi Ganesh as DIG Ajay Yadav
- Rangaraj Pandey as Detective
- Mahesh Dubey as IG Vijay Singh
- Honey Mohandas as Madhuri
- Atishri Shikha Singh as Assistant of the detective
- Firdous Khan as Assistant of the detective
- Avnish Yadav as Constable Suraj
- Arvind Tiwari as Mantri
- Shiv Aryan as Aman
- Viswa Karna as Raju
- Rudra Nath Mishra as Ravi Rana’s father

== Production ==
The film was announced in 2019, a remake of the 2017 Tamil film Thiruttu Payale 2. The principal photography of the film started in November 2019. Filming took place in Lucknow and Varanasi before wrapping up in December 2019.

== Marketing and release ==
The title of the film was announced on 15 October 2021. The first look poster of the film was released on 15 April 2022. Dil Hai Gray (transl. The heart is gray) premiered at the 48th annual Toronto International Film Festival on 12 September 2023. The film was screened at the 54th International Film Festival of India on 27 November 2023.

In July 2024, the film was re-titled as Ghuspaithiya.

== Music ==
Ghuspaithiya

Soundtrack album by Akshay Menon and Sourabh Singh Senger
- Released: August 8, 2024
- Genre: Feature film soundtrack
- Length: 18:27
- Language: Hindi
- Label: Zee Music Company

Official audio
- Ghuspaithiya - Full Album on YouTube

Track listing
No.	Title	Lyrics	Singer(s)	Length
1.	"Tere Bina Ab Toh"	Taranginee Menon	Siddharth Menon	05:15
2.	"Run Run"	Parry G	Saurabh Singh and Parry G	04:32
3.	"Selfie Teri Meri"	Saaveri Verma	Neeti Mohan	02:54
4.	"Tere Bina Ab Toh - Female Version"	Shubhashish Upadhyay	Gul Saxena	05:46
Total length:				18:27

== Reception ==
Dhaval Roy of The Times of India awarded the film 2.5 stars out of five and wrote "Despite a promising premise and a talented cast, Ghuspaithiya falls short of its potential. A tighter script and more nuanced direction could have transformed it into a gripping thriller. Instead, the film stands as a missed opportunity". A critic for Times Now rated the film 3/5 stars. Ganesh Aaglave of Firstpost gave the film 3 out of 5 stars and wrote "On the whole, Ghuspaithiya deserves a watch for its relevant topic and for sharing pivotal insights into cyber crime".

Mahpara Kabir of ABP News rated the film 3.5 out of 5 stars and wrote, "The film from director Susi Ganeshan, has generated significant buzz ahead of its release. Featuring a powerhouse cast including Vineet Kumar Singh, Urvashi Rautela, Akshay Oberoi, and Govind Namdev, this film promises not just entertainment but also a deep dive into the perils of cybercrime." ABP Live gave the movie an overall positive review and wrote "At the end of the film, you will realize how easily 'infiltrators' can destroy your life. If you want to see some of the best in great performances and ground-breaking content, then this is a film that you should not miss".
