= Virumbukiren =

- DVD cover
- Directed by: Susi Ganesan
- Written by: Susi Ganesan
- Based on: Vakkappatta Bhoomi by Susi Ganesan
- Produced by: Mary Francis
- Starring: Prashanth; Sneha; Eswari Rao
- Cinematography: K. V. Anand; Ramji
- Edited by: Suresh Urs
- Music by: Deva
- Production company: V. M. Creations
- Release date: 20 December 2002
- Running time: 157 minutes
- Country: India
- Language: Tamil

Virumbukiren (transl. I would like) is a 2002 Indian Tamil-language romantic drama film directed by Susi Ganesan. Adapted from his novel Vakkappatta Bhoomi (transl. The promised land), the film stars Prashanth and Sneha, while Eswari Rao, Nassar, Livingston and Sriman portrayed supporting roles. Deva composed the film's music while K. V. Anand handled the film's cinematography. The film was released on 20 December 2002. It won four Tamil Nadu State Film Awards including Best Film and Best Director for Susi Ganesan. Sneha also won the Best Actress award, while Easwari Rao won the Best Supporting Actress award.

== Plot ==
Sivan is an aspiring designer. His hopes crash when he ends up with the responsibility of looking after his mother and younger brothers after his father's sudden death. Since his father dies while in service, Shivan is forced to take up his father's job as a fire service man. He meets Thavamani, a beautiful rustic while on a posting in a village, and they fall in love. But Thavamani's father and the whole village are against the lovers. How the lovers fight against all odds and win forms the rest of this love story.

== Cast ==
- Prashanth as Sivan
- Sneha as Thavamani
- Nassar as Thavamani's father
- Livingston as Latha's husband (in a guest appearance)
- Senthil
- Vinu Chakravarthy
- Sriman
- Thaadi Balaji
- Easwari Rao as Latha
- A. K. Veerasamy as Muthaiya
- Y. Gee. Mahendra
- Pandu
- Meesai Murugesan
- Scissor Manohar
- Vennira Aadai Nirmala
- Alphonsa in song "Athili Puthili"
- Bhavana as dancer in song "Pathala Pathala"
- Theni Kunjarammal
- Neelima as Thavamani's first sister
- Baby Heera as Thavamani's second sister
- Robert as dancer in song "Pathala Pathala"

== Production ==
In March 1999, Susi Ganesan, an erstwhile assistant of Mani Ratnam, was able to convince producer Shanti Thiagarajan to fund his first feature film, after he left Mani Ratnam's team of assistant directors. The film was initially titled Thithikkum Thee and was to feature to Murali in the lead role of a firefighter. In return for producing his first film, Shanti Thiagarajan requested Ganesan to also work on another film starring her son Prashanth in the lead role and consequently, Ganesan finalised a script titled Pepsi: Generation Next. In a turn of events, Prashanth replaced Murali in the director's first project, which was retitled as Virumbukiren in early 2000.

The project, Virumbukiren, was launched at Hotel Chola Sheraton, Chennai on 19 January 2000 with Ganesan being introduced as a director. It was announced that the film would have cinematography by K. V. Anand, music by Deva, lyrics by Vairamuthu, art by Thota Tharani editing by Suresh Urs and special effects by Venki; and it would be produced by Vandana Bhatt and Mary Francis under the banner of V.M. Creations. The event was compered by Uma Padmanabhan, while attendees included Kamal Haasan, Mani Ratnam and Prabhu Deva. Actor Vivek refused a role in the film citing that the script was so good that there was no need for a separate comedy track, while Prashanth underwent special training for his role as a fire fighter. Sneha applied for a role in the film after seeing advertisement for the auditions in a newspaper. The story of the film was taken from one of Ganesan's novels titled Vakkappatta Bhoomi (transl. The promised land).

Despite its launch in early 2000, the film went through production troubles and released nearly two years after the launch. A host of Prashanth starrers which were launched after Virumbugiren such as Star, Chocolate, Majunu and Thamizh were subsequently released earlier. Sneha, for whom Virumbugiren was the first film she signed, was reported to be amongst the reasons for the delay after her popularity created problems in her call schedules. The producer of the film had to approach Vijayakanth, the president of the actor's association (Nadigar Sangam) and R. Sarathkumar, also an office bearer, to intervene and resolve the dispute. Similarly, Ganesan also completed and released another film, Five Star, in between the production delays.

== Soundtrack ==
The soundtrack was composed by Deva and lyrics were written by Vairamuthu. Venky of Chennai Online wrote, "This is a surefire winner for Deva. He is in his elements in this album and does what he knows best – composing down to earth 'gaana' songs and easy hummable tunes."

Song	Singer(s)	Duration
"Thodu Thodu"	Unni Menon	5:26
"Nijama Nijama"	Sadhana Sargam, Tippu	5:19
"Pathala Pathala"	Ceylon Manohar, P. Unnikrishnan, Suba, Saisan	5:50
"Athili Puthili"	Vasundhara Das	5:11
"Enga Ooru Santhayile" (Bit)	Krishnaraj	0:49
"Otharuva Pottukkulle" (Bit)	Deva	0:45
"Kat Kat Kattai" (Bit)	Krishnaraj	0:52
"Enna Aachudi" (Bit)	Deva	1:05
"Maman Ponnu Patha" (Bit)	Krishnaraj	0:46
"Kombu Mulaitha Muyale"	Hariharan, Sophia, Satish	6:02

== Reception ==
Malathi Rangarajan of The Hindu praised the cast performances, cinematography, art direction and special effects and concluded, "The revival of family oriented stories, minus the melodrama, augurs well for Tamil cinema. And in that context Virumbugiraen is a welcome change". Sify praised the film labelling that "Prashanth is top class", "Sneha steals some of the scenes with a larkish spontaneity and vivacity", while adding that "Director Susi Ganesan who has written the story and screenplay has done a neat job." Visual Dasan of Kalki wrote Susi Ganesan is a young director who needs to be nurtured, who not only tells the story of a village love in a different context but against the forces that dictate the villagers.

Malini Mannath of Chennai Online wrote, "The scripting and narration move smoothly, and the director has tried to infuse some realism within the framework of commercial cinema. [..] It is only towards the end that the director brings in some distraction in the form of a couple of dance numbers thrust forcibly into the narration". C. Shivakumar of Deccan Herald wrote "A love story with a simple narrative, hummable songs, great script and fine performance by the lead characters. Director Susi Ganesan, has worked hard by extracting brilliant performance from Nasser, Prasanth and Sneha".

== Accolades ==
The film won four Tamil Nadu State Film Awards including Best Film and Best Director (Susi Ganesan). Sneha won the Best Actress award for her work in the film alongside Aanandham and Punnagai Desam, while Easwari Rao won the Best Supporting Actress award.
