= Dandam Dashagunam =

- Directed by: K. Madesh
- Story by: Gautham Vasudev Menon
- Based on: Kaakha Kaakha (Tamil)
- Produced by: A. Ganesh
- Starring: Chiranjeevi Sarja; Ramya; P. Ravi Shankar
- Music by: V. Harikrishna
- Release date: 15 April 2011
- Country: India
- Language: Kannada

Dandam Dashagunam (transl. A stick has ten qualities) is a 2011 Indian Kannada-language action thriller film starring Chiranjeevi Sarja and Ramya. The film has been directed and written by director K. Madesh and produced by A. Ganesh . The Music was composed by V. Harikrishna. The film is slated for release on 15 April 2011. It is a remake of the Tamil film Kaakha Kaakha.

== Plot ==
The film starts with Surya in Pondicherry Government hospital, recalling the accident that changed his life forever.

Surya is an honest, daring IPS officer with the Karnataka Police Department as the ACP in the Crime Branch. As he has no relations in life, he lives with no fear. Surya and his IPS friends Srikanth, Arun, and Bharath are recruited for part of a special unit of police officers who are battling organised crime in Bangalore. Violent and laconic, Surya finds little patience for his personal life. The unit is ruthless in its confrontation with criminals, going as far as assassinating gang members; the unit is finally disbanded after 5 encounters in 3 months, by Human rights authorities; is posted to Control Room Duties.

One day a school teacher named Maya rebuffs Surya's routine questions regarding safety, not knowing that he is a police officer. He meets her again when she and her friend are questioned for driving without a license. However, Surya lets them off with a warning. When one of Maya's students has a problem with local kids, she asks Surya for help. Surya resolves this problem and a mutual respect grows between them. They begin seeing one another. When Maya gets into a road accident, Surya helps her recover, and they fall in love. Srikanth and his wife Swathi become good friends with Maya.

Meanwhile, Manja is a gangster, who escaped the encounter operations. He meets his estranged brother Tamte Shiva, who returns to Bangalore after 14 years of crime life in Maharashtra. Shiva has a peculiar tactic: he kills a family member of his opponent, but leaves the opponent alive to rot in depression on the loss of his family member. Manja's gang, aided by Shiva's planning, commit major kidnappings in the city and become very powerful in 6 months. When the 10-year-old son of an influential movie producer is kidnapped and killed, and later his daughter is also kidnapped for ransom, the special unit is reassembled by the commissioner with all four back in the crime branch. The unit tracks down and kills Manja in a railyard, as others escape. Shiva takes over the gang, promising vengeance over his brother's death. Shiva and his gang members target the families of the men in the special unit, but the police close in, and a badly injured Shiva barely escapes Surya. The same night, Shiva and his men brutally kill Bharath and escapes. The entire department is mobilised, and all family members of the remaining three are sent to hiding.

Maya and Surya get married in a hurry and leave for Mysore, but the next day, Shiva and his thugs enter the cottage that the honeymoon couple are staying in and attack Surya, leaving him for dead, and kidnapping Maya. Surya is battling for life but thinking only about rescuing Maya. Srikanth and Arun arrive at the cottage, discover Surya, and take him to the Pondicherry Government Hospital. Srikanth reveals that Swathi was kidnapped earlier at the airport and confesses that it was he who gave away Surya's location to Shiva, for Swathi's safe return. Srikanth feels extreme remorse over what has happened. Whilst in the hospital, they receive a message from Shiva to meet him at a particular location in Mangalore. When they go there, they find two packages, one containing Swathi's severed head and the other one containing Maya's hand bracelet. Srikanth and Surya are distraught, with the former being hysterical upon seeing Swathi's head, and in an agony of grief and guilt at being responsible, he shoots himself dead. Surya and Arun track down Shiva before he can escape from Karnataka and fights with the gang where he kills Shiva, while rescuing Maya.

In mid-credits scene, One month later, Surya continues his job in the Crime Branch and also lives happily with Maya.

== Cast ==
- Chiranjeevi Sarja as A.C.P Surya I.P.S (voice by Naveen Krishna)
- Ramya as Maya
- P. Ravi Shankar as Tamate Shiva
- Thilak as Srikanth
- Krishna (credited as Sunil) as Police officer
- Kazan Khan

== Soundtrack ==
V. Harikrishna has composed the music for the film.

Song title	Singers
"Kalli Neenu"	Shaan, Shamita Malnad
"Rasikanu Ivanu"	Anuradha Bhat
"Marali Marali"	Karthik
"Ondooral"	Sonu Nigam
"Neenillade"	Chetan Sosca

== Reception ==
=== Critical response ===
A critic from The Times of India scored the film at 3 out of 5 stars and says "Chiranjivi Sarja's performance is that of a matured artiste. Ramya is lovely with her looks and dialogue delivery. But it is `Rough & Tough' Ravishankar who steals the show with his thunderous voice and exciting body language. While music by V Harikrishna is average, cinematography by Manohar is good. K V Raju has penned some catchy dialogues". Shruti Indira Lakshminarayana of Rediff.com scored the film at 1.5 out of 5 stars and wrote "Dandam Dashagunam gives up on a few scenes that the original had, but this cop story still fails to match up to the original. Even director Madesh who has had a success rate with remakes fails this time. This film is no match to Kaakha Kaakha". B S Srivani from Deccan Herald wrote "Overall, the actors’ lack of belief in their roles takes away viewing pleasure. Even the action department fails, with its poorly conceptualised action sequences. Dandam Dashagunam sounds robust, but only in title". A critic from Bangalore Mirror wrote "Among the newcomers in the film who play cameo roles, Umesh Banakar shows promise while Ganesh does not. As for Chiranjeevi, he still has to wait for that elusive super-hit that will make him a star. Dandam Dashagunam won’t help him for sure".
