= Go Goa Gone =

2013 Indian film by Raj & DK

- Theatrical release poster
- Directed by: Raj and D.K.
- Screenplay by: Raj and D.K. Sita Menon
- Dialogues by: Kunal Khemu
- Produced by: Saif Ali Khan; Dinesh Vijan; Sunil Lulla
- Starring: Saif Ali Khan; Kunal Khemu; Vir Das; Anand Tiwari; Puja Gupta
- Cinematography: Dan Macarthur; Lukasz Pruchnik
- Edited by: Arindam S. Ghatak
- Music by: Sachin–Jigar
- Production company: Illuminati Films
- Distributed by: Eros International
- Release date: 10 May 2013
- Running time: 112 minutes (A version) 100 minutes (U/A version)
- Country: India
- Language: Hindi
- Budget: ₹19 crore (US$2.0 million)
- Box office: ₹39 crore (US$4.0 million)

Go Goa Gone is a 2013 Indian Hindi-language zombie action comedy film directed by Raj & DK. The film stars Saif Ali Khan(in an extended cameo), Kunal Khemu, Vir Das, Anand Tiwari, and Puja Gupta. It is widely regarded as India’s first zombie comedy film and has also been described as the country's first stoner comedy.

The film was released theatrically in India on May 10, 2013.

A sequel, Go Goa Gone 2, was officially announced in 2018 but has not been released.

== Plot ==
Hardik and Luv are two young men living with their roommate/friend Bunny. After Hardik loses his job and Luv gets dumped by his girlfriend, they both decide to tag along with Bunny and go to Goa to relax. In Goa, Luv falls for Luna, and she invites the guys to a rave party, organized by the Russian mafia, which is being held on a secluded island. None of the friends try the new drug as it's very expensive. The next morning, the three men discover that the island has been infected by zombies; they run to their boat, but Luv sees a signal from Luna, and he insists they all check for Luna in the hilltop villa. When they reach the villa, they find it stained with blood and Luna hiding inside a room. She tells them about how her friend was feeling sick, who then turned into a zombie and attacked her other friend, and she locked herself. The three save Luna from the villa and stay together in hopes of surviving. When her friends turned zombies attack them on their way, a Russian mafioso, Boris, and his associates arrive and kill the zombies.

They plan to use the boat they had used to travel to the island to escape. Boris and Nikolai give their handguns to Luv and Hardik, despite their insistence, and tell them not to waste the bullets. but they waste all the bullets on a single zombie, which Boris has to eventually kill. They find out that the zombies have to be shot in the head for them to die.

On their way, they find a bunch of zombies. Luna and the three climb a tree, and Boris and Nikolai hide in bushes to escape them, but Hardik falls from the tree, which alerts a zombie. When it comes to attacking Hardik, Boris takes it down with a knife. Boris tells them that it was the new drug, D2RF, for which the party was conducted as a launching ceremony. The drug proved too powerful for the human body to handle, and it shut down all the organs except the hypothalamus, the part of the brain responsible for hunger, which drives them to seek out human blood.

Finally, after escaping the forest, they discover that the mainland has also been infested by the zombies, forcing them to find another way to survive. Boris tells them that the boat will come back to its original place due to the cyclic nature of water currents. However, the boat is occupied by a zombie. They find a home vacant and decide to stay there. They find some fruits in the refrigerator, which they eat for the night. Boris thinks Hardik is infected by his Russian hookup, so he tries to kill him. His friends defend him, and Boris asks them to keep an eye on him. Boris leaves the four of them in the house, telling them that he has some important work with Nikolai.

At night, after Boris leaves, some zombies find the house and attack them. Luv's idea of playing like a zombie and leaving the house fails, so they run away from the zombies and reach the rave party area, looking for food. They are then attacked by another group of zombies. Bunny gets trapped in a tent and is killed by the zombies. The three manage to escape with the help of Boris and Nikolai, who arrive just in time. On the way, Nikolai gets bitten by a zombie, so he stays behind in the forest, and the four are grief-stricken.

Luna realizes Boris has gone to get his expensive cocaine back. While waiting for the boat to arrive, Hardik gets a call from Bunny saying he's alive and on top of a tower. The four of them go to rescue him, and Boris gets surrounded by zombies, but the boys and Luna manage to escape.

When they reach Boris' Jeep, Bunny tells them that he threw cocaine at the zombies who were coming to attack him. The mixing of the D2RF pill and cocaine made them freeze. They go back to save Boris, throw the cocaine packets towards the sky, and tell Boris to shoot them. The trick works, and all the zombies freeze, but Boris still has to take down Nikolai with a rocket launcher. They reach the seaside, waiting for the boat. When it arrives, Boris aims at Ariana, but Hardik tells him not to do it, and he tricks her to get off the boat so they can escape.

They leave the island and come to the conclusion that drugs ruin one's life.

When they arrive at the shores of Goa, they find that the settlement is burning and everything is destroyed. All five take their guns out, and the movie ends on the note – "The End..is near," signalling a zombie apocalypse.

== Cast ==
- Saif Ali Khan as Boris(extended cameo)
- Kunal Khemu as Hardik
- Vir Das as Luv
- Anand Tiwari as Bunny
- Puja Gupta as Luna (voice dubbed by Urvi Ashar)
- Fahim Fazli as Aziz
- Meenal Thakur as Priyanka
- Suparn Verma as Boss (cameo)
- Larrisa Bonesi as Simone
- Krishna D.K. as Guy Devoured by Zombies
- Jasleen Jil as Uninterested Girl at the Bar
- Anuradha Sharma as Interested Girl at the Bar
- Avinash Serrao as Leetle Zombie
- Abhishek Banerjee as Pharmacist (cameo)
- Pitobash Tripathy as the Drug Dealer in the song "Slowly Slowly" (cameo)
- Soha Ali Khan as Hardik's Ex-Girlfriend (cameo)

== Production ==
=== Development ===
To prepare for his role, Saif Ali Khan was given The Zombie Survival Guide by Max Brooks, as he had no prior experience in about zombies.

=== Casting ===
Khan was cast as Boris, a Russian mafioso turned zombie hunter. The lead cast also included Kunal Khemu, Vir Das, Anand Tiwari, and Puja Gupta.

=== Filming ===
Principal photography began in 2012, with about one-third of the film shot on location in Mauritius. Additional scenes were filmed in Goa and Mumbai.

== Marketing ==
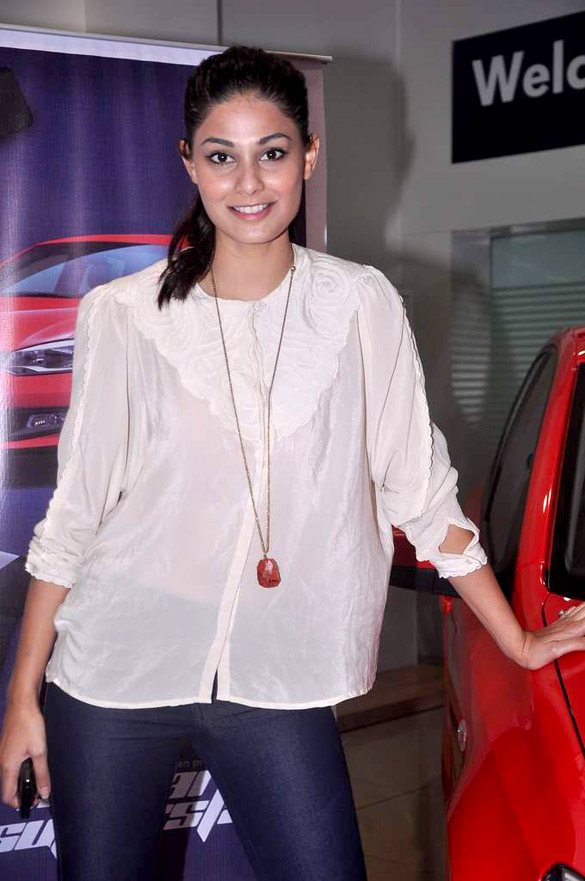
Promotinal stunt with Volkswagen India for the movie Go Goa Gone

=== Promotion ===
Go Goa Gone was marketed as India's first "Zom-Com," a term used to highlight its blend of zombie horror and comedy.

As part of its promotional campaign, the filmmakers partnered with Volkswagen India. A specially selected Volkswagen Polo featured in the film was chosen through a public contest titled "My Car Superstar" conducted in collaboration with the company.

== Soundtrack ==
Go Goa Gone

Soundtrack album by Sachin–Jigar
- Released: 3 May 2013
- Genre: Soundtrack
- Labels: Sony Music India; Eros Music
- Producer: Illuminati Films

Sachin–Jigar chronology
I, Me Aur Main (2013)	Go Goa Gone (2013)	Ramaiya Vastavaiya (2013)

The film's music was composed by the duo Sachin–Jigar, with lyrics written by Priya Panchal and Amitabh Bhattacharya. The soundtrack features vocal performances by Jigar Saraiya, Talia Bentson, Sachin Sanghvi, Priya Panchal, and Shreya Ghoshal.

No.	Title	Lyrics	Music	Singer(s)	Length
1.	"Slowly Slowly"	Priya Panchal	Sachin–Jigar	Jigar Saraiya & Talia Bentson	3:21
2.	"Khoon Choos Le"	Amitabh Bhattacharya	Sachin – Jigar	Arjun Kanungo, Suraj Jagan & Priya Panchal	3:20
3.	"Babaji Ki Booti"	Amitabh Bhattacharya	Sachin – Jigar	Anand Tiwari, Sachin–Jigar, Kunal Khemu, Vir Das, Amitabh Bhattacharya	3:46
4.	"Khushamdeed"	Priya Panchal	Sachin – Jigar	Shreya Ghoshal	3:35
5.	"I Keel Ded Peepul"	Raj & DK	Sachin – Jigar	Saif Ali Khan, Anand Tiwari, Kunal Khemu, Vir Das	1:42

== Reception ==
=== Box office ===
Go Goa Gone was released on 10 May 2013 and had a production budget of approximately ₹19 crore. The film collected around ₹3.75 crore on its opening day and ₹12.9 crore over its opening weekend in India. By the end of its theatrical run, it had earned a total of ₹25.16 crore net domestically (₹32.26 crore gross) and approximately ₹5.56 crore overseas, bringing its worldwide gross to ₹37.82 crore.

=== Critical response ===
The film received mixed reviews from critics and has gathered a cult status in horror comedy.

Piyasree Dasgupta of Firstpost noted that "Go Goa Gone works in a manner similar to why Delhi Belly did" commending it for its "superb pace" and "smart editing". Lisa Tsering of The Hollywood Reporter stated that "the film starts out promisingly" calling its soundtrack "infectious" while also criticising its screenplay for "fizzling out halfway through".

Taran Adarsh of Bollywood Hungama gave the movie 3.5/5 stars and stated that "On the whole, GO GOA GONE is experimental since something like this has never been attempted earlier. But it's fun, witty, amusing and yes, thoroughly entertaining". Meena Iyer of Times of India gave it 3 out of 5 stars and said "Go Goa Gone is positively different from anything you have seen before. And for the young and restless or even those who like whacked-out fun, it's a great ride.". Namrata Joshi of Outlook rated the film 3 out of 5 stars and summarised by saying "It's fun, sharp, smart and irreverent. Go Goa Gone pushes many of our sanctimonious envelopes."

Rajeev Masand gave the film a 3/5 rating and wrote, "So much in this film is good until it all goes nowhere in the end."

Shubir Rishi of Rediff.com gave it 2.5/5 stars and said: "Go Goa Gone" is a fun watch. There are plenty of innocent-sounding, slow-exploding one-liners, which are funny". Anupama Chopra of Hindustan Times gave it 2.5 out of 5 stars stating that, "The problem with Go Goa Gone is too much cleverness and not enough plot. Shubhra Gupta The Indian Express rated the film 2.5 out of 5 stars and wrote, "The film would have been funnier if the second act hadn't gone into a slide. And also if Khan hadn't played Boris so straight."

== Accolades ==
Award	Date of the ceremony	Category	Recipients	Result	Ref.
Chicago International Film Festival	16–18 October 2013	Gold Hugo	Go Goa Gone	Nominated	
BIG Star Entertainment Awards	18 December 2013	Best Entertaining Actor in a Comedy Film	Kunal Khemu	Nominated	
Screen Awards	14 January 2014	Best Comedian	Kunal Khemu	Nominated	
Producers Guild Film Awards	15 January 2014	Best Actor in a Supporting Role	Saif Ali Khan	Nominated	
Producers Guild Film Awards	15 January 2014	Best Actor in a Comic Role	Kunal Khemu	Nominated	

== Sequel ==
A sequel to Go Goa Gone was initially announced with production scheduled to begin in January 2019. However, filming was postponed to September 2020 due to scheduling conflicts among the lead cast. On 15 January 2020, Maddock Films released the first-look poster of Go Goa Gone 2 on its social media platforms, announcing a planned release for March 2021. The project was subsequently delayed as a result of the COVID-19 pandemic. The sequel has not yet been released.
