= Machakaaran =

- Poster
- Directed by: Tamilvannan
- Written by: Tamilvannan
- Starring: Jeevan; Kamna Jethmalani
- Cinematography: A. Venkatesh
- Edited by: Raja Mohammad
- Music by: Yuvan Shankar Raja
- Production company: Madras Entertainment
- Release date: 8 November 2007
- Running time: 142 minutes
- Country: India
- Language: Tamil

Machakaaran is a 2007 Indian Tamil-language romantic action film written and directed by Tamilvannan. The film stars Jeevan and Kamna Jethmalani in lead roles. The film score and soundtrack were composed by Yuvan Shankar Raja. The film was released on 8 November 2007 during Diwali.

== Plot ==
Vicky is the eldest son of a railway officer. He is a perpetual loser in whatever he does and other family members look down upon him. One day, he meets Shivani, the daughter of a rich textile tycoon, who has brought all the luck to her father Rajangam. The "unlucky" Vicky is drawn towards the "lucky" Shivani, and they fall madly in love. Due to circumstances, they are forced to elope, with Shivani’s cop brother in hot pursuit. The lovers decide to go to Rajangam’s village in Theni, where he is considered and treated as "Mr. Nice Guy", a philanthropist and savior of the locals, and is given the honour of conducting the temple festival every year. How the runaway couple against all odds rips his good guy image and exposes him in front of the entire village forms the rest of this predictable yarn.

== Cast ==
- Jeevan as Vicky
- Kamna Jethmalani as Shivani
- Shobaraj as Shivani's brother
- G. M. Kumar as Rajangam
- Malavika as Item number in "Nellayila Mannedutha"
- Santhanam as Vicky's friend
- Vaiyapuri as Vicky's friend
- Mayilsamy as Police Constable
- M. S. Bhaskar as Police Constable
- Santhana Bharathi as Shivani's uncle
- Vinod Raj as Vicky's father
- Prem as Rajangam's relative
- Bayilvan Ranganathan as Village chief
- Kalairani as Vicky's aunt
- Nellai Siva as Policeman
- Scissor Manohar as Villager
- Muthukaalai as Nadaswaram player
- Benjamin as Palladam Bangaru
- Aarthi as College student
- Jaya Murali as Shivani's mother
- Jayashree as Vicky's elder sister
- Bava Lakshmanan as a drunkard (uncredited)

== Soundtrack ==
For the musical score of Machakaaran, director Thamizhvaanan teamed up with composer Yuvan Shankar Raja again, after the duo gave chart-topping songs in the director's previous venture Kalvanin Kadhali (2005). The soundtrack, which features 5 tracks overall, was released on 24 October 2007 and garnered generally positive reviews.

Song	Singer(s)	Duration	Lyricist
"Nellayila Mannedutha"	Roshini	4:43	Pa. Vijay
"Vaanathayum Megathayum"	Haricharan	4:49	Pa. Vijay
"Vayasu Ponnukku"	Mahalakshmi Iyer	3:47	Pa. Vijay
"Jigiruthaanda"	Shankar Mahadevan, Snekha Bandh	4:21	Pa. Vijay
"Nee Nee Nee"	Hariharan, Madhushree	4:33	Devandharan

== Reception ==
A critic from Rediff.com rated the film 1/2 out of 5 stars and wrote that "Machakkaran is a sheer waste of time, money, efforts and everything else thanks to the absence of anything worthwhile during its span of approximately 195 minutes". A critic from Sify wrote that the film "turns out to be a hackneyed, boring regressive piece of kitsch, that leaves you exhausted at the end!" Kalki magazine wrote the film would have reached another dimension if the twists had been made less predictable. But the director has struggled which sadly he couldn't do. Malini Mannath of Chennai Online wrote "'Machakkaran' is a much better effort than the director's earlier film 'Kalvanin Kadhali'. If only he had worked more on the second half of the script, the film would have turned into a more engaging entertainer".
