= Vannivelampatti =

- Village
- Location in Tamil Nadu, India Vannivelampatti (India)
- Coordinates: 9.744574°N 77.841101°E
- Country: India
- State: Tamil Nadu
- District: Madurai district

Population (2001)
  - Total: 3,524

Languages
  - Official: Tamil
- Time zone: UTC+5:30 (IST)
- PIN: 625702
- Telephone code: 91-(0)4549
- Vehicle registration: TN 58

Vannivelampatti (Tamil: [ʋɐnːɪʋeːlɐmbɐʈːi]) is a gram panchayat in the Madurai district of the Indian state of Tamil Nadu.

== History ==
Vannivelampatti was known as Vannivalampatti which means, a village (patti) situated at the right side of the strange Vanni Vinayaka facing west at the top of the Devankkurichi hill.

=== Groups based on belief ===
Earlier the village was divided as atheist group and another as non atheist group. Apart from regular Grama Panchayat, a Grama Committee was constructed by one Mr. Kailasam Pillai. a middle school teacher and was headed by him. Consequently, the rivalry among two groups was abolished and the village was integrated.

== Self development ==
The village follows a rural development method called (Tamil: நமக்கு நாமே). Construction works were done by the grama committee without expecting any financial assistance from government. For instance, Teppakulam ( Water Tank) construction, funeral path and bridge. This is an efficient method of development and creates jobs internally and without government support.

=== Education ===
In 1950, the middle school teacher Mr. Kailasampillai, a native of this village and Mr. S.V. Subbiah, headmaster (a native of Karaikeni village) had started Noon meal scheme at the beginning of the 1950s (before noon meal scheme was introduced by state government by former chief minister of Tamil Nadu Mr. K. Kamaraj) by getting rice and pulses from farmers as donation during harvest season.

== Culture ==
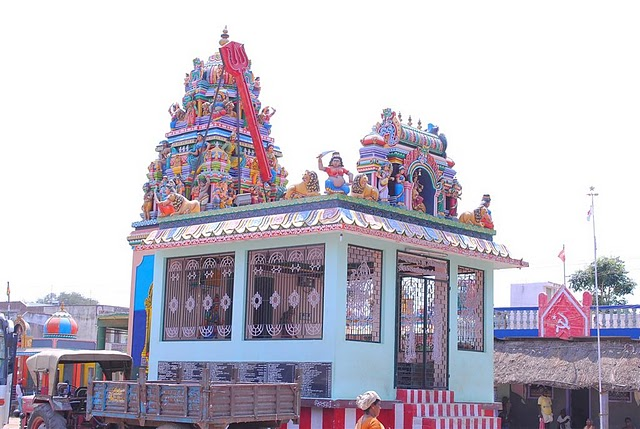
Kaliamman Temple in Vannivelampatti

People of Vannivelampatti mainly worship Kaliamman & Mariamman incarnation of Amman. Every year a pongal festival will be celebrated in the month of June. Vannivelampatti is one of the 7 villages(Thevankurichi, T. Kallupatti, Vannivelampatti, Ammapatti, Kadaneri, Kilangulam, Satrapatti) to celebrate the Muthalamman festival every 2 years.

- Vembulaiyan (Lord Shiva) Temple Located in South Side of the village is an Ancient symbol of the culture.
- Director Susi Ganesan belongs to Vannivelampatti and many young boys pursue a career in dancing and stage shows

== Economy ==
Agriculture is the main occupation. People use T. Kallupatti as their main hub for all needs and also with Peraiyur.

== Politics ==
Vannivelampatti is noted for its long-standing communist political culture, which local accounts trace to Vembuli, a labourer who returned from Thanjavur and helped establish a communist organisation in the village after being influenced by mobilisation around the 1968 Keezhvenmani massacre. That legacy is reflected in the use of communist symbols, the naming of residents after communist leaders, and collective mobilisation around land rights, public services and caste inequality.

== Geography ==
Vannivelampatti is Situated 3 km far from T. Kallupatti which is on Madurai to Rajapalayam and Virudhunagar to Theni Highways.
