= Tamil Nadu State Film Award for Best Film =

Indian state award

The Tamil Nadu State Film Award for Best Film is given by the Government of Tamil Nadu as part of the annual Tamil Nadu State Film Awards for Tamil-language (Kollywood) films. It includes prizes for three top places.

== Key ==
Key for the table
†	Award for Best Feature Film (First prize)
‡	Award for Best Feature Film (Second prize)
§	Award for Best Feature Film (Third prize)
*	No Award presented

== List of winners ==
List of films
Year	Film	Producer/Studio	Director
1967	Kaavalkaaran †	Sathya Movies	P. Neelakantan
1967	Aalayam ‡	Sunbeam Productions	Thirumalai–Mahalingam
1967	Bama Vijayam §	Manohar Productions	K. Balachander
1968	Uyarndha Manithan †	AVM Productions	Krishnan–Panju
1968	Thillana Mohanambal ‡	Shri Vijayalakshmi Pictures	A. P. Nagarajan
1968	Thamarai Nenjam §	Bama Films	K. Balachander
1969	Adimaippenn †	MGR Pictures	K. Shankar
1969	Akka Thangai ‡	Dhandayuthapani Films	M. A. Thirumugam
1969	Deiva Magan §	Shanti Films	A. C. Tirulokchandar
1970	Vietnam Veedu †	Sivaji Productions	P. Madhavan
1970	Thedi Vandha Mappillai ‡	Padmini Pictures	R. K. Shanmugam
1970	Namma Kuzhanthaigal §	Suresh Productions	Poovannan
1971	No Award *		
1972	No Award *		
1973	No Award *		
1974	No Award *		
1975	No Award *		
1976	No Award *		
1977	16 Vayathinile †	S. A. Rajkannu	Bharathiraja
1977	Madhurageetham ‡	Sri Venkatalakshmi Productions	V. C. Guhanathan
1977	Balaparitchai §		
1978	Mullum Malarum †	Venu Chettiyar	Mahendran
1978	Aval Appadithan ‡	Kumar Arts	C. Rudhraiya
1978	Ilamai Oonjal Aadukirathu §	Kannaiyaa	C. V. Sridhar
1979	Pasi †	Lalitha	Durai
1979	Puthiya Vaarpugal ‡	Manoj Creations	Bharathiraja
1979	Thisai Maariya Paravaigal §	P.S.V. Pictures	S. Jagadeesan
1980	Varumayin Niram Sivappu †	R. Venkatraman	K. Balachander
1980	Nenjathai Killathe ‡	K. Rajgopal Chetty	Mahendran
1980	Vandichakkaram §	Vivekananda Pictures	K. Vijayan
1981	Alaigal Oivathillai †	R. K. Bhaskar	Bharathiraja
1981	Keezh Vaanam Sivakkum ‡	Muktha Films	V. Srinivasan
1981	Moondram Pirai §	G. Thyagarajan	Balu Mahendra
1982	Enkeyo Ketta Kural †	P. A. Art Productions	S. P. Muthuraman
1982	Agni Sakshi ‡	Kavithalayaa Productions	K. Balachander
1982	Ezhavathu Manithan §	Lata Creations	K. Hariharan
1983	No Award *		
1984	No Award *		
1985	No Award *		
1986	No Award *		
1987	No Award *		
1988	Poo Pootha Nandavanam †	Sri Amman Creation	B. V. Balaguru
1988	Paasa Paravaigal ‡	Poompuhar Production	Cochin Haneefa
1988	Agni Natchathiram §	G. Venkateswaran	Mani Ratnam
1989	Pudhea Paadhai †	A. Sundaram	R. Parthiepan
1989	Pudhu Pudhu Arthangal ‡	Kavithalayaa Productions	K. Balachander
1989	Nyaya Tharasu §	Menaka Pictures	K. Rajeshwar
1990	Pudhu Vasantham †	R. B. Chowdary, R. Mohan	Vikraman
1990	Keladi Kanmani ‡	A. Sundaram	Vasanth
1990	Kizhakku Vasal §	G. Thyagarajan	R. V. Udayakumar
1991	Chinna Thambi †	K. Balu	P. Vasu
1991	En Rasavin Manasile ‡	Rajkiran	Kasthuri Raja
1991	Gunaa §	Alamelu Subramaniam	Santhana Bharathi
1992	Roja †	Kavithalayaa Productions	Mani Ratnam
1992	Thevar Magan ‡	Kamal Haasan	Bharathan
1992	Chinna Gounder §	Venu Chettiyar, V. Mohan, V. Natarajan	R. V. Udayakumar
1993	Jathi Malli †	Kavithalayaa Productions	K. Balachander
1993	Pathini Penn ‡	Best Friends Creations	R. C. Sakthi
1993	Gokulam §	R. B. Choudary	Vikraman
1994	Naatamai †	R. B. Choudary	K. S. Ravikumar
1994	Nammavar ‡	B. Venkatarama Reddy	K. S. Sethumadhavan
1994	Pavithra §	K. Subash	K. Subash
1995	Anthimanthaarai †	Chandraleela Bharathiraja, Thilaka Ganesh	Bharathiraja
1995	Kolangal ‡	Henry	I. V. Sasi
1995	Avatharam §	Vaidyanathan	Nassar
1996	Indian †	A. M. Rathnam	S. Shankar
1996	Kadhal Kottai ‡	Sivashakthi Pandian	Agathiyan
1996	Purushan Pondatti §	P. K. Yadav	N. K. Viswanathan
1997	Arunachalam † Suryavamsam †	Annamalai Cine Combines; R. B. Choudary	Sundar C Vikraman
1997	Porkkaalam ‡	M. Kaja Mydeen, V. Gnanavelu, V. Jaya Prakash	Cheran
1997	Arasiyal §	Motherland Movies Internationals	R. K. Selvamani
1998	Natpukkaga †	A. M. Rathnam	K. S. Ravikumar
1998	Marumalarchi ‡	Henry	Bharathi
1998	Unnidathil Ennai Koduthen §	Lakshmi Movie Makers	Vikraman
1999	Padayappa †	Arunachala Cine Creations	K. S. Ravikumar
1999	Thullatha Manamum Thullum ‡	R. B. Choudary	Ezhil
1999	Ethirum Puthirum §	G. S. Madhu	Dharani
2000	Vanathai Pola †	V. Ravichandran	Vikraman
2000	Vaanavil ‡	Manoj Kumar	Manoj Kumar
2000	Vetri Kodi Kattu §	Shivashakti Movie Makers	Cheran
2001	Virumbugiren †	Mary Francis	Susi Ganesan
2001	Pandavar Bhoomi ‡	Sujatha, M. Varadaraja, K. Maniprasad, Media dreams Limited	Cheran
2001	Aanandham §	R. B. Choudary	N. Lingusamy
2002	Ramanaa †	V. Ravichandran	A. R. Murugadoss
2002	Kannathil Muthamittal ‡	Mani Ratnam, G. Srinivasan	Mani Ratnam
2002	Unnai Ninaithu §	Lakshmi Movie Makers	Vikraman
2003	Eera Nilam †	Manoj Bharathiraja	Bharathiraja
2003	Power of Women ‡	Jayadevi Films	Jayadevi
2003	Parthiban Kanavu §	Sathya Jyothi Films	Karu Pazhaniappan
2004	Autograph †	Cheran	Cheran
2004	Vishwa Thulasi ‡	Ramki	Sumathy Ram
2004	Kannadi Pookal §	Teamwork Productions	K. Shajahan
2005	Chandramukhi† Ghajini †	Ramkumar Ganesan, Prabhu; Salem A. Chandrasekaran	P. Vasu; A. R. Murugadoss
2005	Anniyan ‡	V. Ravichandran	S. Shankar
2005	Thavamai Thavamirundhu §	P. Shanmugam	Cheran
2006	Veyil †	S. Shankar	Vasanthabalan
2006	Paruthi Veeran ‡	K. E. Gnanavelraja	Ameer Sultan
2006	Thiruttu Payale §	AGS Entertainment	Susi Ganesan
2007	Sivaji †	M. S. Guhan, M. Saravanan	S. Shankar
2007	Mozhi ‡	Prakash Raj	Radha Mohan
2007	Pallikoodam §	Vishwas Films	Thangar Bachan
2008	Dasavathaaram †	V. Ravichandran	K. S. Ravikumar
2008	Abhiyum Naanum ‡	Prakash Raj	Radha Mohan
2008	Santosh Subramaniam §	AGS Entertainment	M. Raja
2009	Pasanga †	M. Sasikumar	Pandiraj
2009	Mayandi Kudumbathar ‡	United Arts	Rasu Madhuravan
2009	Achamundu Achamundu §	Arun Vaidyanathan, Asma Hashmi, Ananth Govinda, P. Srinivasan, Ramzan Lakhan	Arun Vaidyanathan
2010	Mynaa †	Shalom Studios	Prabhu Solomon
2010	Kalavani ‡	Sherali Films	A. Sargunam
2010	Puthiran §	Saithanya Movies	Jayabharathi
2011	Vaagai Sooda Vaa †	S. Muruganandham, N. Puranna	A. Sargunam
2011	Deiva Thirumagal ‡	M. Chinthamani, Ronnie Screwvala	A. L. Vijay
2011	Uchithanai Muharnthaal §	Global Media & Entertainment	Pugazhendhi Thangaraj
2012	Vazhakku Enn 18/9 †	N. Subash Chandrabose, Ronnie Screwvala	Balaji Sakthivel
2012	Saattai ‡	Shalom Studios	M. Anbazhagan
2012	Dhoni §	Duet Movies	Prakash Raj
2013	Ramanujan †	Srivatsan Nadathur, Sushant Desai, Sharanyan Nadathur, Sindhu Rajasekaran	Gnana Rajasekaran
2013	Thanga Meenkal ‡	Gautham Vasudev Menon	Ram
2013	Pannaiyarum Padminiyum §	M. R. Ganesh	S. U. Arun Kumar
2014	Kuttram Kadithal †	J Sathish Kumar, Christy Siluvappan	Bramma G
2014	Goli Soda ‡	N. Linguswamy, Bharath Seeni, N. Subash Chandrabose	Vijay Milton
2014	Nimirndhu Nil §	K. S. Sreenivasan, K. S. Sivaraman	Samuthirakani
2015	Thani Oruvan †	AGS Entertainment	Mohan Raja
2015	Pasanga 2 ‡	Pandiraj, Suriya	Pandiraj
2015	Prabha §	Nandan. A, Muthuramalingam	Nandan. A
2016	Maanagaram †	Potential Studios	Lokesh Kanagaraj
2016	Puriyatha Puthir ‡	Rebel Studio	Ranjit Jeyakodi
2016	Maaveeran Kittu §	Asian Cine Combines	Suseenthiran
2017	Aramm †	KJR Studios	N. Gopi Nainar
2017	Vikram Vedha ‡	YNOT Studios	Pushkar-Gayathri
2017	Taramani §	Catamaran Productions, JSK Film Corporation	Ram
2018	Pariyerum Perumal †	Neelam Productions	Mari Selvaraj
2018	Kadaikutty Singam ‡	2D Entertainment	Pandiraj
2018	96 §	Madras Enterprises	C. Prem Kumar
2019	Asuran †	V Creations	Vetrimaaran
2019	Oththa Seruppu Size 7 ‡	Bioscope Film Framers	R. Parthiban
2019	Comali §	Vels Films International	Pradeep Ranganathan
2020	Koozhangal †	Rowdy Pictures	PS Vinothraj
2020	Soorarai Pottru ‡	2D Entertainment, Sikhya Entertainment	Sudha Kongara
2020	Sandakkari §	Boss Production Corporation	R. Madhesh
2021	Jai Bhim †	2D Entertainment, Amazon Studios	T. J. Gnanavel
2021	Kadaisi Vivasayi ‡	Tribal Arts Production	M. Manikandan
2021	Karnan §	V Creations	Mari Selvaraj
2022	Gargi †	Blacky, Genie & My Left Foot Productions	Gautham Ramachandran
2022	Taanakkaran ‡	Potential Studios	Thamizh
2022	Witness §	People Media Factory	Deepak
