= Adimai Penn =

1969 film by K. Shankar

- Theatrical release poster
- Directed by: K. Shankar
- Story by: R. M. Veerappan; S. Lakshmanan; S. K. T. Samy
- Produced by: M. G. Ramachandran; R. M. Veerappan
- Starring: M. G. Ramachandran; Jayalalithaa
- Cinematography: V. Ramamoorthy
- Edited by: K. Narayanan
- Music by: K. V. Mahadevan
- Production company: Emgeeyaar Pictures
- Release date: 1 May 1969
- Running time: 180 minutes
- Country: India
- Language: Tamil
- Budget: ₹ 50 lakh

Adimai Penn (transl. Slave Woman) is a 1969 Indian Tamil-language historical action film directed by K. Shankar and produced by M. G. Ramachandran and R. M. Veerappan. The film stars Ramachandran and Jayalalithaa, with Ashokan, Pandari Bai, Rajasree, Manohar, Chandrababu and Cho in supporting roles. It revolves around the efforts of a deceased king's son to free the enslaved people of a kingdom from their tyrant king.

Ramachandran had the desire to make Adimai Penn as early as 1963. The project entered production with him directing and starring, B. Saroja Devi and K. R. Vijaya co-starring and P. N. Sundaram as cinematographer, but was dropped after some progress. When revived with a new story, it had a largely new cast and crew while Ramachandran remained as the star. Filming took place primarily in Jaipur, Rajasthan, and was completed within 100 working days.

Adimai Penn was released on 1 May 1969 and became a turning point in Ramachandran's career and a box office success, with a theatrical run of over 175 days. It won many awards, including the Filmfare Award for Best Tamil Film, and three Tamil Nadu State Film Awards, including Best Film (First Prize) and Best Female Character Artiste for Pandari Bai. A digitally restored version of the film was released on 14 July 2017

== Plot ==
Abhirami Mangamma, a princess, is desired by Sengodan, a king. Several years later, Sengodan sees Abhirami (now a queen and married) out hunting. He declares his love, but Abhirami says that she is a mother. Sengodan tries to kill her infant son, prince Vengaiyan and Abhirami severs Sengodan's leg. The king Vengaiyan from the Vengaiya mount kingdom goes to Sengodan's country (Soorukathu kingdom) seeking justice, and Sengodan agrees to a duel. The duel takes place over a net with spears below it; the dueller will lose if he loses his weapon or falls from the net, and his country will be enslaved by the winner. Since Sengodan has only one leg, king Vengaiyan binds his own leg and the duel begins. Vengaiyan wins the duel, but then is treacherously killed by Sengodan.

Sengodan orders his men to seize the slain king's kingdom and summon the queen and her son, also named Vengaiyan. One of the king's aides escapes and saves the queen, but Vengaiyan is taken prisoner. All women in the country are enslaved. The queen stays in hiding for many years. The king's aide is imprisoned and sees Vengaiyan, who has been forced to live in a two-foot high cell, and has not learnt how to speak or eat with his hands. They escape from the prison by the river. The aide dies in his granddaughter Jeeva's arms after she promises to heal Vengaiyan and help abolish slavery in their country. Jeeva takes Vengaiyan to her hut, teaches him to speak, write and fight. Vengaiya begins to understand that he is a prince, but is a hunchback because of his confinement.

Vengaiya saves a girl from two warriors. When he is helping the girl (who is bound between two heavy wooden planks, like a pillory), his spine straightens, allowing him to stand normally. Jeeva tells the prince what he must do, and shows him his mother. When he sees his mother's condition, Vengaiyan vows to free the country from Sengodan's enslavement. The prince, with help from Jeeva and others, attacks a group of soldiers and begins freeing people from slavery. During one assault, he meets Magudapathy, the leader of the neighbouring Pavala kingdom who is related to Sengodan. Magudapathy is astonished to see Jeeva because of her resemblance to his queen, Pavalavalli. He conspires to replace the queen with Jeeva and take over the country, which separates Vengaiyan and Jeeva from their followers. The commander, claiming the prince is a spy, hides Jeeva.

Pavalavalli, who is actually Jeeva's sister, presides over the prince's trial. She is attracted to him, and orders that he be released and posted as her bodyguard. The commander plans to kill both the queen and the prince at a party with a poisoned drink, but it is moved by one of the prince's aides, a magician. The commander orders the arrest of the prince and the queen. Jeeva impersonates the queen so she and Vengaiya can be freed and allowed to return to their country. Pavalavalli is dressed in Jeeva's clothes and kept in captivity, to be killed later. The commander goes to the prison and admits his plan; Vengaiyan kills him and escapes with Pavalavalli, thinking she is Jeeva.

Vengaiyan finally reaches his country, which has changed during his long absence. His house has been gutted by fire, his farms plundered and his men oppose him. Vengaiyan tells them his story, coercing them to rejoin the army. Pavalavalli joins Sengodan's side, awaiting revenge. Abhirami Mangamma is captured by Sengodan's men, who threaten to execute her. Vengaiyan and his men sneak into the palace and fight Sengodan; he kills Sengodan, releases his mother and frees his kingdom.

== Cast ==
- M. G. Ramachandran as King Vengaiyan and Prince Vengaiyan
- Jayalalithaa as Jeeva and Pavalavalli
- Ashokan as Sengodan
- Manohar as Magudapathy
- Chandrababu as The doctor of campaign, the Prince Vengaiya's friend
- Cho as the magician
- Jyothi Lakshmi as Azhagu's elder sister
- Rajasree as Muthazhagi
- Pandari Bai as Abhirami Mangamma
- Baby Rani as Azhagu
- Udayabhanu as a slave (uncredited)

== Production ==
=== Development ===
M. G. Ramachandran had the desire to make Adimai Penn as early as 1963. As director, producer and lead actor, he launched the film with B. Saroja Devi and K. R. Vijaya as the lead actresses and P. N. Sundaram as cinematographer. Some scenes were filmed, but the project was dropped. When relaunched with a new story, Ramachandran remained in his positions (except directing, which was given to K. Shankar) and Jayalalithaa was cast as the sole female lead, while V. Ramamoorthy was hired as the new cinematographer, and K. Narayanan as the editor. This was the second film Ramachandran produced after Nadodi Mannan (1958). This was Chandrababu's last film with Ramachandran; as he was in financial crisis, Ramachandran gave him a substantial fee.

=== Filming ===
Filming took place primarily in Jaipur, Rajasthan. During the filming, Ramachandran was given a white fur cap to shield him from the desert sun; this would later become his signature look. While filming in the Thar Desert, Jayalalithaa had to walk barefoot on the sand to portray her character; the sand became gradually hotter and Ramachandran suspended filming after noticing her discomfort. For the climax scene, Ramachandran fought with an actual lion which was later named Raja. It was the last Tamil film to be shot in City Palace, Rambagh Palace and Samode Palace until Annabelle Sethupathi (2021). Filming was completed within 100 working days. The film was colourised using Eastmancolor.

== Themes ==
According to Ramachandran, Adimai Penn is neither a historical nor a social, or a "story with exciting, cinematic effects", but it focuses "on some fundamental issues in the society, which makes the human spirit to suffer and weaken."

== Soundtrack ==
The soundtrack was composed by K. V. Mahadevan. It marked Jayalalithaa's debut as a playback singer; on the sets of Kannan En Kadhalan (1968), Ramachandran saw her perform a Mirabai bhajan. Impressed, her offered her to sing "Amma Endral Anbu" for Adimai Penn. Although the first Tamil film signed by playback singer S. P. Balasubrahmanyam was Shanti Nilayam, Adimai Penn (in which he sang "Aayiram Nilave Vaa") ended up releasing earlier. T. M. Soundararajan was chosen to sing "Thaai Illamal" as it needed "more zeal".

Track listing
No.	Title	Lyrics	Singer(s)	Length
1.	"Aayiram Nilave Vaa"	Pulamaipithan	S. P. Balasubrahmanyam, P. Susheela	4.56
2.	"Amma Endral"	Vaali	J. Jayalalithaa	4.59
3.	"Kaalathai Vendravan"	Avinashi Mani	P. Susheela, S. Janaki	6.14
4.	"Thaai Illamal"	Alangudi Somu	T. M. Soundararajan	3.36
5.	"Unnai Paarthu"	Vaali	T. M. Soundararajan	5.14
6.	"Yemmattraathe"	Vaali	T. M. Soundararajan	4.37
Total length:				28.16

== Release ==
Adimai Penn was released on 1 May 1969. The film was a commercial success and became a turning point in Ramachandran's career. The film broke the record for the most people watching the film within the first week of its release. It ran for 175 days at the Chintamani Theatre in Madurai, for 100 days in theatres in Madras, Trichy, Kovai and Salem and 120 days at the Central Theatre in Nellai. In 1970, a dubbed Hindi version named Koi Ghulam Nahi (transl. No one is a slave) was released.

=== Critical reception ===
The Indian Express wrote on 10 May, "Some movies are made for the passion of making them. Some are made for regretting later. Some are made to entertain. When entertainment is the prime factor everything that is possible is brought in to please the masses. One such movie is Emgeeyar films Adimai Penn". The reviewer praised V. Ramamurthy's cinematography, but felt the music was "not up to the other achievements of the film". On 1 June, Ananda Vikatan called it a new type of film, saying no such film was made in Tamil so far, and compared it favourably to American films like Ben-Hur (1959) and Samson and Delilah (1949). Reviewers appreciated Jayalalithaa for singing in her own voice, comparing her favourably to actresses T. R. Rajakumari and P. Bhanumathi who were known for singing in their own voices as opposed to using playback singers.

=== Accolades ===
Event	Award	Awardee	Ref.
17th Filmfare Awards South	Best Film – Tamil	Adimai Penn	
Tamil Nadu State Film Awards	Best Film (First Prize)	Adimai Penn	
Tamil Nadu State Film Awards	Best Character Artiste (Female)	Pandari Bai	
Tamil Nadu State Film Awards	Best Music Director	K. V. Mahadevan	
Tamil Nadu Cinema Fans Association Awards	Best Actress	Jayalalithaa	

== In popular culture ==
One scene in the film involving the magician changing the various glasses of juices kept while narrating a story to Magudapathy, by which Magudapathy's glass with poison gets mixed up, was re-enacted in Andaz Apna Apna (1994).

== Re-release ==
Adimai Penn was digitally restored and re-released on 14 July 2017.

== Bibliography ==
- Dhananjayan, G. (2011). The Best of Tamil Cinema, 1931 to 2010: 1931–1976. Galatta Media. OCLC 733724281.
- Kannan, R. (28 June 2017). MGR: A Life. India: Penguin Random House. ISBN 978-93-86495-88-4.
- Rajadhyaksha, Ashish; Willemen, Paul (1998) [1994]. Encyclopaedia of Indian Cinema. British Film Institute and Oxford University Press. ISBN 0-19-563579-5.
