= University (film) =

2002 movie by Praghadish

- DVD cover
- Directed by: Praghadish
- Written by: Praghadish
- Produced by: T. Ve. Shathish; Vibha; P. Balasubrahmanyam; Ussha Balasubrahmanyam
- Starring: Jeevan; Gajala
- Cinematography: Ra. Krishna
- Edited by: V. T. Vijayan
- Music by: Ramesh Vinayakam
- Release date: 4 October 2002
- Running time: 141 minutes
- Country: India
- Language: Tamil

University is a 2002 Indian Tamil-language romance film directed by Praghadish, starring Jeevan and Gajala. Jeevan made his debut and Gajala made her Tamil debut with this film. University was not commercially successful at the box office.

== Plot ==
This movie is about a socially awkward college student named Gandhi (Jeevan), who cannot seem to have joyful social interactions with people. He greatly differs from his peers-he doesn't smoke, drink or participate in any vices, which immediately sets him apart when it comes to friendships. One fine day in college, his Romeo friend gets hit by an oncoming scooter, which a happy and extroverted girl called Shanmathi (Gajala) was riding. In a fit of anger, Gandhi reprimands her, which instantly earns him her distaste. His friend, however, put up a show of nicety, later on plotting to sabotage her by puncturing the wheel of her scooter. Despite Gandhi's pleas to stop him, he continues to do so. When the former tried to rectify the punctured wheel, Shanmathi comes by and is revolted by Gandhi's actions, mistaking his intentions and thinking that he instead, was trying to puncture the tire for revenge. The real saboteur comes by, once more acting as if Gandhi was at fault. Much to Aalthotta Boopathy's (Vivek) surprise, Gandhi never utters a word in defense. It is then revealed that due to his difficult upbringing that resulted in his introverted and low self esteem nature, he never speaks up for himself.

On another occasion, there was a molest case in college whereby Shanmathi and Gandhi were witnesses. Shanmathi had made an agreement with Gandhi not to reveal the ugly truth to anyone in attempts of protecting the affected girl's future, to which Gandhi complies. However, through a professor's prodding, Shanmathi reveals the truth, once more mistaking Gandhi and thinking that he was the one who had revealed to the professor about the molestation. Due to his bad luck with people, Gandhi resorts to using a phone book to call people and say, "Wrong number", in which he uses the opportunity to speak with unknown people. Through this eccentric method, he calls Shanmathi one night. She was on the verge of committing suicide as her father had forced her into flying off to Malaysia since he disliked her love for singing, traveling and enjoying without a care in the world. It was then that Gandhi called, successfully preventing her from committing suicide. He then advises her on how she ought to face her problems and not run away from them like a coward, thereby changing her decision. The both of them have therefore never seen each other before. However, the gratitude that Shanmathi had for Gandhi slowly started blossoming into love as the both of them continued to speak on the phone with each other. Shanmathi wants to meet Gandhi at a restaurant, to which he reluctantly agreed. Despite his low self esteem, he gets excited as this is the first time someone has expressed liking for him. He dresses up fashionably for the first time and enters the restaurant with flowers, positive that his phone-lover would approve of him. However, upon entering the restaurant, he realizes that she is Shanmathi, the girl who has great distaste for him. Unfortunately, he spills over her drink while walking by, thereby increasing her distaste for him. He left the restaurant, dejected. When questioned by Shanmathi over the phone about his absence, he informed her that he will approach her on Valentine's Day. However, when he was just about to approach her, he accidentally steps on her scarf, which led to Shanmathi mistaking him for being a pervert. Once again feeling dejected, Gandhi decides never to approach her as she will never like him should she see him. With her friend's help, Shanmathi manages to trace the address of the mystery caller, eventually realizing that he is from her college.

Gandhi writes beautiful poems during his past time, of which the college's Psychology professor discovers and appreciates. Since the college's culturals was approaching, Shanmathi was appointed to sing a song, of which Gandhi is the lyricist, as appointed by the professor. Despite Gandhi's denial, the professor insists, to which Gandhi reluctantly agreed. When Gandhi asks Shanmathi about the mood of the song to which he can write appropriate lyrics, she neglects him completely, showcasing utter dislike for him. Gandhi overhears her conversation with her friend, in which she reveals how her song should bring forth her mystery lover. Gandhi writes the lyrics accordingly, which Shanmathi never takes notice of. When the professor discovers that Shanmathi was disturbed by her mystery lover, he instructs Boopathy to find out who that mystery lover is.

Aal Thotta Bhoopathy appoints an actor, Bala, to act like Shanmathi's mystery lover so that her real lover will stop Bala and reveal his identity. Shanmathi immediately believes that actor despite vast difference in the voice. To his dismay, Gandhi discovers that Shanmathi is in love with a man who was acting like him. Even when Boopathy scribbles love notes on the walls of the college, Shanmathi's real lover never appeared. Like many of the previous incidents, Gandhi never reveals the truth. Unfortunately, Bala takes advantage of the situation and tries to marry Shanmathi without anyone's knowledge. Gandhi finally opens up to his professor and receives an eye-opening lecture from him. He is then persuaded into revealing his identity and expressing his love for Shanmathi. Meanwhile, Boopathy reveals his ill-fated plot to Shanmathi, who cannot bear it any longer and resorts to suicide once more. Gandhi then uses a speaker to say the very same words of advice against suicide as he first did to her, which reaches Shanmathi's ears. She tries to run into the room where her mystery lover is, only to be stopped by Bala. In a short duel, Boopathy manages to stab Bala's leg and free Shanmathi, who jostles in the crowd and reaches the room her lover was in. Upon discovering that her lover was Gandhi, she regrets dismissing him rudely several times. The movie ends as she runs and hugs Gandhi, delighted that she has found the man she had been dreaming about.

== Cast ==
- Jeevan as Gandhi a.k.a. Wrong Number
- Gajala as Shanmathi
- Vivek as Aal Thotta Bhoopathy
- Raghuvaran as Tamilselvan
- Sonia as Gouri
- Ilavarasu
- M. S. Bhaskar
- Sridhar as Sridhar
- Johny
- Raviraj as Professor
- Mona Chopra as an item number

== Production ==
Jeevan made his acting debut in this film. The director was supportive of Jeevan's decision to not cut his hair for the film, which was unconventional for actors during that time.

== Soundtrack ==
Music composed by Ramesh Vinayakam.

All lyrics are written by Vairamuthu.

Track listing
No.	Title	Singer(s)	Length
1.	"Jeevan Engae"	Mathangi	6:08
2.	"Jyothika Radhika"	Anuradha Sriram	5:28
3.	"Kathalai Valarthai"	Ramesh Vinayakam, K. S. Chithra	5:26
4.	"Kiss Adippom"	Tippu, Mathangi, Ramesh Vinayakam	5:36
5.	"Nenjae Thullipo"	Karthik	4:50
6.	"Vaan Mazhai"	Sujatha	5:21
7.	"Vimmavey"	Ramesh Vinayakam, Gopika Poornima	2:46
Total length:			35:35

== Critical reception ==
Malathi Rangarajan of The Hindu opined that "The imperfect lip-sync at many points, and minor faux pas such as the one about caller-id telephones, could have been avoided. [...] Yet this University, which is a decent, dignified portrayal of love, has an indisputable freshness about it". Sify gave a mixed review stating that "University like the title, is all about half-baked love mixed with the right ingredients like music and comedy. But somehow the film peters out after a promising start".

Malini Mannath of Chennai Online called the film a "a peppy, youthful film with an interesting fresh star team and a pace that doesn't lag". Cinesouth wrote, "The faint thread of suspense in the screenplay and Vivek's comedy are the only two things that make this film slightly watch-able. Other than these, the film is extremely frustrating".
