= Tamil Nadu State Film Award for Best Character Artiste (Female) =

Indian film award

The Tamil Nadu State Film Award for Best Supporting Actress is given by the state government as part of its annual Tamil Nadu State Film Awards for Tamil films. The award was first given in 1968 and stopped after 1970. The award in the category resumed in 2000.

== The list ==
Here is a list of the award winners and the films for which they won.

Year	Actress	Film	Ref
1968	Manorama	Thillaanaa Mohanambal	
1969	Pandari Bai	Adimaipenn	
1970	Pushpalatha	Engal Thangam	
2001	Easwari Rao	Virumbugiren	
2002	Anu Hasan	Run	
2003	Sangeetha	Pithamagan	
2004	Seetha	Rightaa Thappaa	
2005	Kalairani	Kodambakkam	
2006	Saranya Ponvannan	Em Magan	
2007	Archana	Onbadhu Roobai Nottu	
2008	Pooja Umashankar	Naan Kadavul	
2009	Renuka	Ayan	
2010	Saranya Ponvannan	Kalavani	
2011	Lakshmy Ramakrishnan	Uchithanai Muharnthaal	
2012	A. Revathi	Ammavin Kaipesi	
2013	Tulasi	Pannaiyarum Padminiyum	
2014	Kuyili	Kaaviyathalaivan	
2015	Gauthami	Papanasam	
2016	Manisha Yadav	Oru Kuppai Kathai	
2017	Sunu Lakshmi	Aramm	
2018	Viji Chandrasekhar	Kadaikutty Singam	
2019	Sriranjani	House Owner	
2020	Vadivukkarasi	Jananyagam Viruppanaikk Alai	
2021	Raichal Rabecca	Kadaisi Vivasayi	
2022	Vasundhara	Vaazhga Vivasaayi	

== See also ==
- Tamil cinema
- Cinema of India
