= Puja Gupta =

Indian model and actress (born 1987)

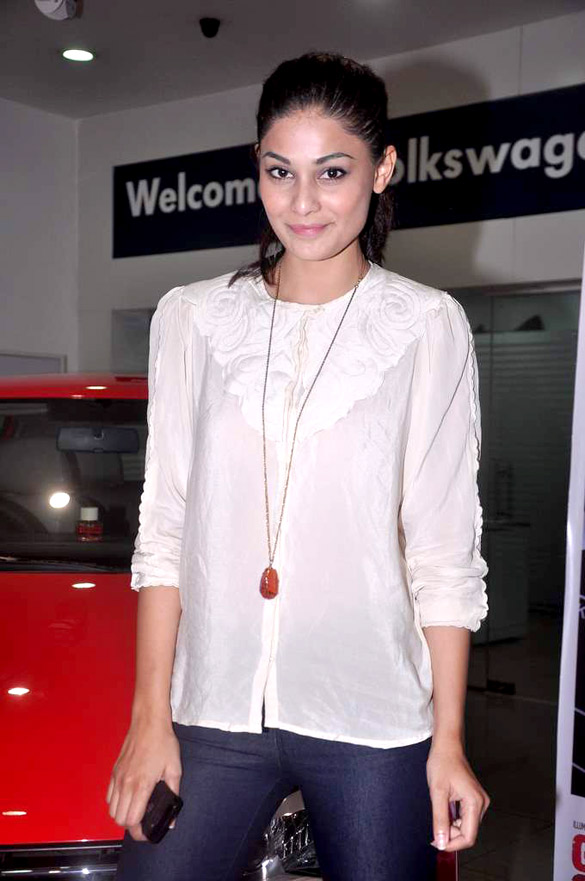
- Gupta in 2013
- Born: Puja Gupta; 30 January 1987 (age 39); New Delhi, India
- Occupations: Actress, model
- Spouse: Varun Talukdar (m. 2019)
- Beauty pageant titleholder
- Title: Femina Miss India Universe 2007
- Years active: 2007–present
- Major competitions: Femina Miss India 2007 (Winner); Miss Universe 2007 (Top 10)

Puja Gupta is an Indian actress, model and beauty pageant titleholder. She predominantly works in Hindi films. She won the title of Femina Miss India in 2007 and represented India at Miss Universe 2007 where she made it in top 10 finalists.

== Life and career ==
Gupta was born in New Delhi, India. Her modeling breakthrough came in 2007 when she won the title of Miss India Universe. She represented India at the 2007 Miss Universe competition in Mexico, where she made the top ten. Finishing 9th overall. Following this, she became the marketing face for a number of brands and labels.

She made her acting debut in the film F.A.L.T.U. In 2013, she appeared in the film Go Goa Gone and Shortcut Romeo. As at 2018 she has eight acting credits, according to IMDb.

Gupta is a supporter of the animal rights organization PETA.

== Personal life ==
Gupta is married to investment banker Varun Talukdar.

== Filmography ==
| Year | Title | Role | Notes |
|---|---|---|---|
| 2011 | F.A.L.T.U | Puja | Debut film |
| 2013 | Go Goa Gone | Luna | Zombie film |
| 2013 | Shortcut Romeo | Sherry / Raathikha | |
| 2015 | Hate Story 3 | | Cameo appearance in movie song "Neendein Khul Jaati Hain" |
| 2020 | Dangerous | | Web series |
| TBA | Go Goa Gone 2 | Luna | |

Awards and achievements
| Preceded by (India) Neha Kapur | Femina Miss India Universe; 2007 | Succeeded by (India) Simran Kaur Mundi |
