= Five Star (film) =

- DVD cover
- Directed by: Susi Ganesan
- Written by: Susi Ganesan
- Produced by: Mani Ratnam; G. Srinivasan
- Starring: Prasanna; Kaniha; Krishnakumar Ramakumar; Sandhya; Mangai; Karthik
- Cinematography: Ravi Varman
- Edited by: A. Sreekar Prasad
- Music by: Sriram Parasuram; Anuradha Sriram
- Production company: Madras Talkies
- Release date: 4 October 2002
- Country: India
- Language: Tamil

Five Star is a 2002 Indian Tamil-language coming-of-age film written and directed by Susi Ganesan in his debut, and produced by Madras Talkies. The film stars newcomers Prasanna, Kaniha, Krishnakumar Ramakumar, Sandhya, Mangai, and Karthik. The film had an ad campaign for 5 Star, which was seen during the interval and end credits. The film was later remade in Telugu as Lifestyle (2009) with a different climax, which had a similar campaign with Lifestyle.

== Plot ==
The story focuses on five friends - Prabhu, Elango, Sundar, Indra, and Priya - at the Madras Institute of Technology, who want to remain friends throughout their lifespan and hope to join the same company after graduation.

During a vacation, Elango goes home, where his tough, disciplinarian father forces him to marry his old-fashioned cousin, Eshwari. Once back in college, he hides his marriage from his friends, but it later becomes public when Eshwari's relatives come to visit Elango. While their dream to work together becomes true, Elango alone gets a transfer to Bombay. The friends fight, but later reunite.

Before Elango goes to Bombay, the friends force him to visit his wife and put him on a train, but he manages to get off it. From there, he loses touch with his friends and family in the village.

The friends part, and six years later, Prabhu and Sundar come back to join Priya and Indra in Chennai. On the train journey back, Prabhu meets Elango's wife, Eshwari. He falls in love with her without realising who she is. Eventually, he and his friends realize the truth about Eshwari, who is hoping for her husband's return. The four friends decide to help Eshwari find Elango's whereabouts. One day, Prabhu finds out that Elango might be in Switzerland and decides to go there. Later, he finds Elango, but to his shock, the latter has a child and is married to a Swiss woman. At the same time, in India, Elango's father commits suicide. Prabhu returns to India and learns that everyone knows about Elango's marriage.

Eshwari decides to marry again and move on with life rather than thinking about Elango. Her village people decide to marry her off to one of her relatives, but she threatens them, telling them off and stating that she will decide her own life and no one is going to control her life anymore. The story ends with all four friends and their husbands and wives, along with Eshwari, enjoying an evening at the beach.

== Cast ==
- Prasanna as Prabhu
- Kaniha as Eshwari
- Krishnakumar Ramakumar as Elango
- Sandhya Prakash as Priya
- Mangai as Indra
- Karthik as Sundar
- Vijayan as Mayilsamy, Elango's father
- Ramesh K. Saamy as Ravi, Priya's husband
- Minnale Ravi as Gopi, Indra's husband
- Srilekha Rajendran as Flower seller
- Idichapuli Selvaraj as Train Ticket Examiner (TTR)
- Chitti Babu as Train Ticket Examiner (TTR)
- Sukumar as Sukumar
- Baby Haritha as Aishwarya, Priya's daughter
- Theni Kunjarammal as Villager (uncredited)

== Production ==
In March 1999, Susi Ganesan was able to convince producer Shanti Thiagarajan to fund his first feature film, after he left Mani Ratnam's team of assistant directors. The film was initially titled Thithikkum Thee and was to feature to Murali in the lead role of a firefighter. In return for producing his first film, Shanti Thiagarajan requested Ganesan to also work on another film starring her son Prashanth in the lead role and consequently, Ganeshan finalised a script titled Pepsi: Generation Next. In a turn of events, Prashanth replaced Murali in the director's first project, which was retitled as Virumbugiren in early 2000. Pepsi was later supposed to star Madhavan in a lead role, but he eventually did not feature as the team opted for newcomers. Since the title Pepsi was registered by Jeeva, Ganesan ended up renaming his film as Five Star.

For the heroine, Ganesan spotted her on a magazine cover page and insisted on her performing the lead female role in his second feature film. Divya eventually entered the Film industry, accepting the offer, while her name was changed to Kanika. She completed the entire film during her summer holidays, since she was a student. Prasanna who was doing college at that time saw an ad on Vijay TV that Madras Talkies was auditioning for newcomers, he applied and got selected. For other lead roles, Karthik, the son of a Tirupur businessman, Krishna, an earlier assistant to director Rajiv Menon, Sandhya, a model and also a former Ms. Chennai, and Mangaikarasi, a dancer based in Sweden. The film marked the debut of cameraman Ravi Varman in Tamil cinema. Singer Anuradha Sriram and her husband Sriram Parasuram made their debut as music directors with this film. The film had a 10-day shooting schedule at the M.I.T. College where Susi Ganesan had studied, followed by a 15-day schedule in Switzerland where some scenes and two songs were shot.

== Soundtrack ==
Music was composed by Sriram Parasuram and Anuradha Sriram (credited as Parasuram Radha).

| Song | Artist(s) |
|---|---|
| "Thiru Thiruda" | Srinivas, Sujatha |
| "Sunday" | Karthik, Mathangi, Nitish, Jayashree, Arsith |
| "Engirindhu Vandhayada" | Chandana Bala |
| "Oru Manam" | Parasuram Radha |
| "Engalukku" | Instrumental |
| "Rayile" | P. Unnikrishnan |
| "Five Star" | Anuradha Sriram, Shubha Mudgal, Timmy, Chinmayi |
| "Engalukku" | Devan Ekambaram, Kanika |

== Reception ==
Malini Mannath of Chennai Online wrote "Some young promising talent, a story centered round youth and their aspirations, the fulfillment of some, the disillusionment of others, stylised takings and a sincere attempt to give an entertainer sans vulgarity and double entendres, makes 'Five Star' a clean, fairly engaging family entertainer." Malathi Rangarajan of The Hindu wrote, "Susi Ganesan's youthful, hard-hitting dialogue and a fairly neat screenplay are notable aspects of the film — the story and direction, also by him are done with a difference".
