= Kalvanin Kadhali (2006 film) =

2006 Indian Tamil film directed by Tamilvanan

- Poster
- Directed by: Tamilvannan
- Written by: Tamilvannan
- Produced by: Lakshman
- Starring: S. J. Suryah; Nayanthara
- Cinematography: N. K. Ekambaram
- Edited by: G. Sasikumar
- Music by: Yuvan Shankar Raja
- Production company: Dream Makers UK5
- Release date: 17 February 2006
- Country: India
- Language: Tamil

Kalvanin Kadhali (transl. The Thief's Lover) is a 2006 Indian Tamil-language romantic comedy film written and directed by newcomer Tamilvannan, and produced by Lakshman. The film stars S. J. Suryah and Nayanthara, with Shraddha Arya, Pyramid Natarajan, Vivek and Ganja Karuppu playing supporting roles. The soundtrack and film score were composed by Yuvan Shankar Raja. It is set in the backdrop of a playboy's tricks. The film was released on 17 February 2006.

== Plot ==
Sathya is a casanova and pursues Tina. Later, he sets his sights on Haritha and manages to woo her. She starts loving him wholeheartedly, but he is not in favour of that. At one moment he falls for Haritha, but at the same time, she discovers his real character, and ends their relationship. The story is about how Sathya changes himself and earns her love back.

== Cast ==
- S. J. Suryah as Sathya
- Nayanthara as Haritha
- Shraddha Arya as Tina
- Vivek as Babloo
- Pyramid Natarajan as Sathya's father
- Sarath Babu as Ram Kumar
- Manicka Vinayagam as Haritha's father
- Ganja Karuppu as Karuppu
- S. N. Lakshmi as Haritha's grandmother
- Malavika Avinash as Haritha's sister-in-law
- Sathyapriya as Tina's boss
- Kaajal Pasupathi as Babloo's pair
- Bayilvan Ranganathan
- Kadhal Arun Kumar
- Cell Murugan as Cart puller
- Tejashree, special appearance in an item number

== Production ==
The film, originally titled 36-28-36, is the directorial debut of Tamilvannan. It is, notably, S. J. Suryah's first film as the hero, which was not directed by himself. The film was launched at AVM Studios, and a song sequence was shot there the same day. Filming was also held at Munnar and Kochi. Sherin Shringar, Flora Saini and Namitha were initially approached for an item number; however Tejashri Khele was finally chosen.

== Soundtrack ==
The soundtrack was composed by Yuvan Shankar Raja and was released on 29 November 2005 at Albert Theatre, Chennai by actor Kamal Haasan. The music generally received praise and positive responses, topping the charts. The song "Ivan Kattil" was based on "Oh My Gosh" by the British duo Basement Jaxx.

Song	Singer(s)	Lyricist	Duration
"Ivan Kattil"	Clinton Cerejo, Andal, Mova	Muthu Vijayan	4:26
"Kudakkooli Koduthachu"	Anushka Manchanda, Premji Amaran	Vaali	4:04
"Tajmahal Oviyakkadhal"	Vijay Yesudas, Srimathumitha	Vaali	5:07
"Uyir Piriyum Valiyai"	Ranjith	Muthu Vijayan	2:20
"Eno Kangal"	Yuvan Shankar Raja, Sadhana Sargam	vaali	5:31

== Release ==
Kalvanin Kadhali was released on 17 February 2006. During its release, lawyers demanded the makers to remove banner hoardings of the film in Anna Salai, citing their vulgarity and the fact that there was a school near the Anna Flyover in the same area.

== Critical reception ==
Sify said, "This love story has the Suryah stamp of humour and is sure to satisfy his fans, who enjoy his smutty comedies". Malathi Rangarajan of The Hindu wrote, "That Suryah is honing his skills as an actor, is evident. The increasing spontaneity in his expressions is heartening. But it is hard to swallow the contrived emotions when he tries to fool the heroine's people". Lajjavathi of Kalki wrote the director has given a film by mixing vulgarity and message together however found the screenplay without any confusion but felt it would have been a film for everyone if it had removed the embarrassing lines and scenes. Cinesouth wrote, "If we thought that this was not S.J.Suryah’s film, but Tamilvanan’s, we were thoroughly disappointed".
