= Jeevan (Tamil actor) =

Indian actor

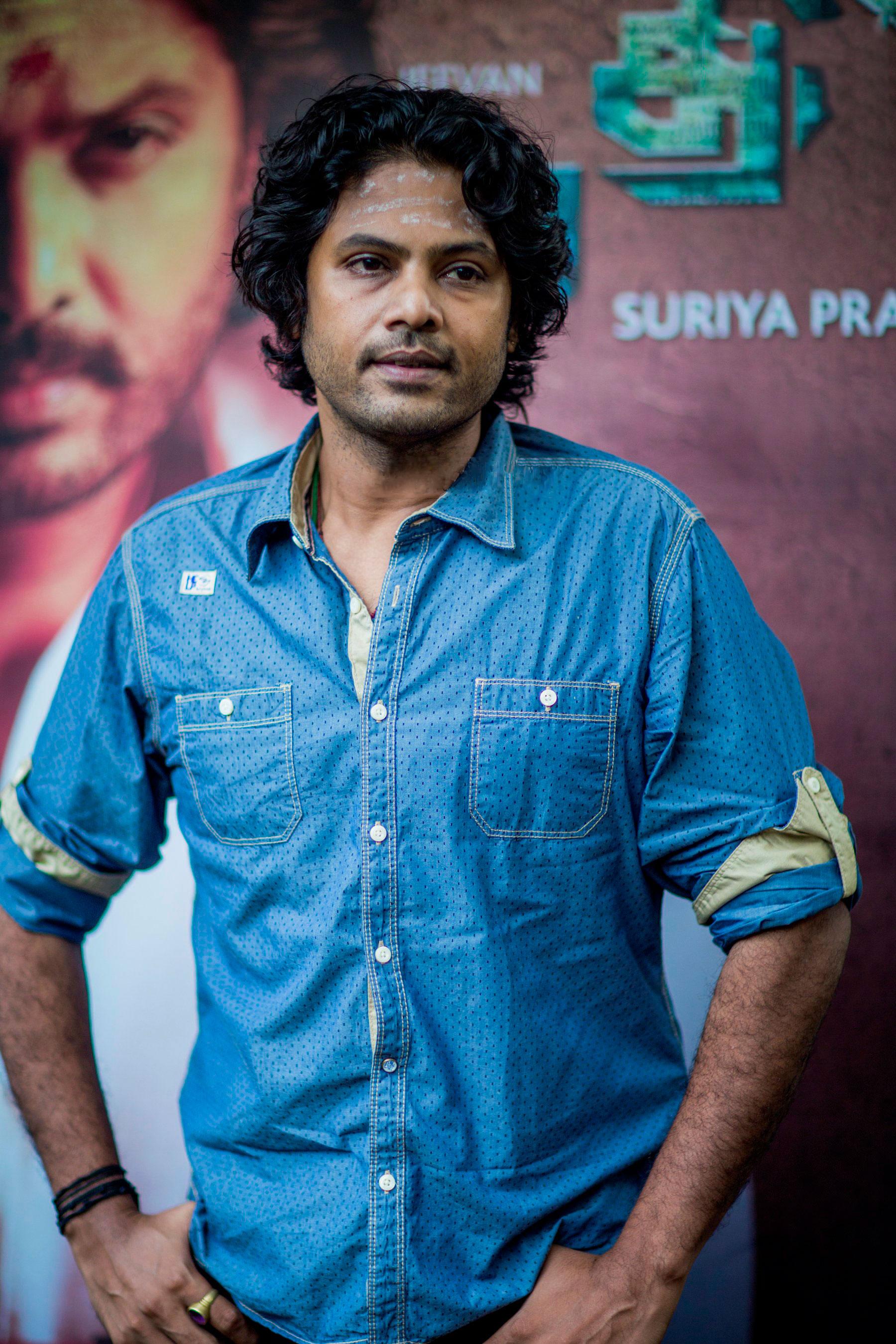
- Jeevan at the Adhibar Press Meet
- Born: Vijayabaskar Rangaraj; 6 July 1975 (age 51); Chennai, Tamil Nadu, India
- Occupation: Actor
- Years active: 2002–2010; 2015-present

Jeevan (born Vijayabaskar Rangaraj) is an Indian actor in the Tamil film industry. He first appeared in the film University (2002). However, this was followed by greater success Kaakha Kaakha (2003). Following a 3-year sabbatical, he returned as an actor in the main role with Susi Ganesan's Thiruttu Payale (2006), which earned him praise. He signed up for the remake of the 1974 film Naan Avanillai (2007), and post-release gained even more praise for helping it become a success.

== Biography ==
He graduated from the St. Bede's School in Chennai. One of his classmates was actor Suriya. He took up BA in Theatre Arts. He studied theatre in London, and then took a 2½ years training in acting at the Stella Adler Studio of Acting in Hollywood. He worked as a bartender in a pub in East London called 'Weatherspoons'.

== Career ==
He first appeared in the film University but remained largely unnoticed due to poor public opinion of the film. However, this was followed by greater success as Pandiya in Kaakha Kaakha. Despite winning critical acclaim and receiving several offers to play the antagonist in Tamil films, Jeevan waited two years and opted against signing any more films since he wanted to play lead characters. In March 2005, he was offered the film Thotta directed by Selva and accepted to work on the film, though delays meant he had starred in other films as protagonist before it released.

Following a three-year hiatus, he returned as an actor in the main role with Susi Ganesan's Thiruttu Payale, which earned him praise. He signed up for the remake of the 1974 film Naan Avanillai, and post-release gained even more praise for helping it become a success. His recent releases include Thotta (co-starring Priyamani) and Machakaaran (opposite Kamna Jethmalani). His other ventures include Jeyikkira Kuthira and Asariri are yet to be released. Pambattam released in 2024 after a four-year delay.

== Filmography ==
Year	Film	Role	Notes
2002	University	Gandhi	
2003	Kaakha Kaakha	Pandiya	Filmfare Award for Best Villain; ITFA Best Villain Award
2006	Thiruttu Payale	Manickam	
2007	Naan Avanillai	Joseph Fernandez / Annamalai / Vignesh / Madhavan Menon / Zakir Hussein / Hariharan Das / Shyam Prasad	
2007	Machakaaran	Vicky	
2008	Thotta	Shanmugham	
2009	Naan Avanillai 2	Joseph Fernandez	
2015	Adhibar	Siva	
2024	Pambattam	Boominathan / Saravanan	Dual roles
