= Kanthaswamy =

2009 film directed by Susi Ganesan

- Theatrical release poster
- Directed by: Susi Ganesan
- Written by: Susi Ganesan
- Produced by: Kalaipuli S. Dhanu
- Starring: Vikram; Prabhu; Shriya Saran
- Cinematography: N. K. Ekambaram
- Edited by: Praveen K. L. N. B. Srikanth; Rajesh Kumar
- Music by: Devi Sri Prasad
- Production company: V. Creations
- Distributed by: Kalaipuli Internationals (India); Ayngaran International (Overseas)
- Release date: August 21, 2009
- Running time: 195 minutes
- Country: India
- Language: Tamil
- Box office: est. ₹53 crore

Kanthaswamy is a 2009 Indian Tamil-language vigilante action film directed and written by Susi Ganesan. The film stars Vikram as the titular character, with Prabhu, Shriya Saran, Ashish Vidyarthi, Mukesh Tiwari, Krishna and Vadivelu appearing in supporting roles. The film was mostly dubbed in Telugu as Mallanna with Vadivelu's scenes partially reshot with Brahmanandam. The film's soundtrack and background score were composed by Devi Sri Prasad.

The film was released on 21 August 2009 and received positive reviews and became a success at the box office.

== Plot ==
Kanthaswamy is an officer in the CBI Economic Offences Wing, who along with his friends grants the wishes of the needy (whom they write letters in Lord Muruga temple) by disguising as an anthropomorphic rooster behavioured vigilante. During a CBI raid, Kanthaswamy discovers a stash of black money owned by Pallur Paramajothi Ponnusamy alias PPP, an arrogant business tycoon, and his partner Rajmohan. Ponnusamy pretends to suffer from a stroke in order to escape questioning by the police. Ponnusamy's daughter Subbalakshmi gets enraged by the news and goes after Kanthaswamy to seek revenge by pretending to be in love with him.

Knowing her real intentions, Kanthaswamy plays along, until where they fall in love with each other in reality. In a parallel comedic role, Thengakadai Thenappan/Kobarikayala Subbayya is also sought by a local police inspector who tries to solve the mystery of "Lord Muruga saving the people". In a series of twists, the police inspector is able to bring out the truth that the CBI is involved in the role behind the secret work of helping the needy people, though he is not able to prove it. Kanthaswamy finds the password of PPP's bank account, in which the black money is illegally saved, by tricking Subbalakshmi into revealing the password and answering the security questions.

Kanthaswamy transfers the money to his own account, which he would use for helping poor and needy people. In the end, Ponnusamy actually gets a stroke upon seeing his money gone and the account's null balance. Kanthaswamy encounters Rajmohan, whom people think to be a humble person. Kanthaswamy reveals Rajmohan's true intentions, which leads the people to understand Rajmohan's true colour and Kanthaswamy arrests him. Subbulakshmi, who realizes that her father is a corrupt person, proposes to Kanthaswamy where they get married and live in Rajasthan. Kanthaswamy reads some letters tied to a tree (just like the ones at the Lord Muruga temple), where he puts a letter in a pocket with a secret smile, implying that he will pursue as a vigilante again.

== Cast ==
- Vikram as V. Kanthaswamy IPS, Superintendent of Police of CBI Economic offences Wing
- Prabhu as Parandhaman IPS, DIG of CB-CID
- Krishna as R. Krishna Rao IPS, Joint Director of CBI
- Shriya Saran as PP Subbulakshmi, PPP's Daughter (voiceover by Suchitra)
- Vadivelu as Thengakadai Thenappan
- Ashish Vidyarthi as Pazhuvur Paranjothi Ponnusamy "PPP" (voiceover by P. Ravi Shankar) and Subbulakshmi's father
- Mukesh Tiwari as Rajmohan, PPP's partner (voiceover by Subbu Panchu)
- Y. G. Mahendran as Ganganathan, PPP's assistant
- Mansoor Ali Khan as Inspector
- Vinod Raj as Rajmohan's assistant
- Charle
- Alex as Mexico Pichumani
- Mumaith Khan as Herself ,actress (item number) - appears in the Song En Peru Meenakumari and post song scenes.
- Ilavarasu as Constable
- Mayilsamy
- Muthukaalai as Auto driver
- King Kong as Thief
- Halwa Vasu as Thenappan's sidekick
- Sevvalai Rasu
- Nellai Siva as Constable
- Chelladurai as Constable
- Susi Ganesan as Ganesh IPS, Superintendent of Police of IB and Kanthaswamy's friend

Uncredited

- Boys Rajan as CB-CID officer
- Vengal Rao as Coconut thief
- Citizen Mani as bystander

Telugu version

- Brahmanandam as Kobbarikayala Subbayya
- Gundu Hanumantha Rao as Auto driver
- Kallu Chidambaram as Coconut thief
- Rocket Raghava as Jaffa

== Production ==
=== Development ===
The inauguration of Kanthaswamy took place on 22 September 2007 at the Devi Paradise theatre in Chennai. For the event, a unique electronic invitation, made in China, was presented to guests who had been invited. The invitation was the size of a laptop and featured an 8-minute trailer of Kanthaswamy. Each invitation had cost about Rs. 15,000, making it the most expensive invitation in Indian film history. Following the launch ceremony, the team announced they had adopted two villages near Madurai; Sangampatti and Gandhi Nagar, to shoot in initially and then to provide basic amenities like school and proper roads among other things to the villagers for a year. The team, who were praised for their actions, were the first production team to take part in such activity in Tamil cinema.

In November 2007, the shooting was halted temporarily due to an accident that occurred at the shooting spot at the Chennai Boat Club. Cameraman Ekambaram was canning the shots as per director Susi Ganesan's instructions when a pole erected on the sets unexpectedly fell on the director's head, resulting in an injury. The film finished schedules at Italy, where the trailer was filmed as well as schedules in Tanzania, Kenya and Switzerland. During the production of the film, actor Raghuvaran died suddenly and hence subsequently, his role was replaced by Ashish Vidyarthi, which also led to a delay in the release of the film. A schedule in locations in Mexico was also held, after the team went location hunting there, with a song and several scenes canned.

=== Casting ===
Following the announcement of the project, Shriya Saran was signed in February 2007, when she was in the middle of completing her other projects Sivaji: The Boss and Azhagiya Tamil Magan. In September 2007, with the release of the trailer several other artistes names were featured as supporting cast. Prominent supporting actor Raghuvaran was selected to play as Shriya's father and shot scenes in the role, before his unexpected death during the production of the film, subsequently, his role was replaced by Ashish Vidyarthi. Prabhu was also added in a supporting role, as well as lesser established actors such as Vikram's father Vinod Raj, Y. G. Mahendran, Shiv, Arun Madhavan, Vinayak and Alex, whilst Mumaith Khan was assigned for an item number. Later on, veteran Telugu actor Krishna was signed to a role in the project as well as Indrajith who will do a villainous role in the film. Indrajith was selected for the role ahead of other prominent character actors Arjun Rampal, Irfan Khan and Suman. Along with the change of actor for Raghuvaran's role, Indrajith's role was taken by Mukesh Tiwari and the role created for Santhanam was deleted. Moreover, Vivek, who had featured in the original trailer, opted out and was replaced by Vadivelu. Mansoor Ali Khan took up a negative role in the film to make a comeback in acting.

The producer of Kanthaswamy, Kalaipuli S. Dhanu and Susi Ganesan, the director ensembled an experienced team to produce the film. Veterans Thotta Tharani, A. S. Laxmi Narayanan and Viveka between them, take care of the art direction, audiography and lyrics respectively. Devi Sri Prasad composed the music. While N. K. Ekambaram was assigned as the director of photography of the film, the film was edited by three film editors Praveen K. L., N. B. Srikanth and M. V. Rajesh. Kanal Kannan and Chatrapathy Shakthi are the fight masters for the film, whilst Mittra media are responsible for the publicity designs of the film outputs, adding to their work with the trailer and the invitations. The film is co-produced, by Chennai businessmen, A. Paranthaman and A. K. Natraj, along with Dhanu.

== Music ==
The film has seven songs composed by Devi Sri Prasad. For the first time, Vikram has sung most of the songs in this movie.

=== Tamil ===
Kanthaswamy

Soundtrack album by Devi Sri Prasad
- Released: 17 May 2009
- Recorded: 2009
- Genre: Feature film soundtrack
- Length: 35:04
- Language: Tamil
- Label: Sony Music India
- Producer: Devi Sri Prasad

Devi Sri Prasad chronology
| Current (2009) | Kanthaswamy (2009) | Arya 2 (2009) |

The songs from the album was released to the public after an audio launch at the Chennai Trade Centre in Chennai on 17 May 2009. "En Peru Meenakumari" samples "Bambara Kannaala" from Manamagan Thevai (1957).

All tracks are written by Viveka.

Track-List
| No. | Title | Singer(s) | Length |
|---|---|---|---|
| 1. | "Excuse Me" | Vikram, Suchitra | 05:46 |
| 2. | "Allegra" | Rita Thyagarajan | 05:23 |
| 3. | "Meow Meow" | Vikram, Priya Himesh | 04:31 |
| 4. | "Ithellam Dupe" | Vikram, Devi Sri Prasad | 04:08 |
| 5. | "Mambo Mamiya" | Vikram, Rita | 04:36 |
| 6. | "En Peru Meenakumari" | Malathy Lakshman, Krishna Iyer | 04:20 |
| 7. | "Kanthaswamy Theme" | Devi Sri Prasad | 03:04 |
| 8. | "Kanthaswamy" (DSP mix) | Devi Sri Prasad | 03:16 |
| Total length: | | | 35:04 |

=== Telugu ===
Mallanna

Soundtrack album by Devi Sri Prasad
- Released: 2009
- Recorded: 2009
- Genre: Feature film soundtrack
- Length: 35:05
- Language: Telugu
- Label: Sony Music India
- Producer: Devi Sri Prasad

"Naa Peru Meenakumari" samples "Pachagaddi Koseti" from Dasara Bullodu (1971).

All lyrics are written by Sahithi.

Track-List
| No. | Title | Singer(s) | Length |
|---|---|---|---|
| 1. | "Excuse Me" | Vikram, Suchitra | 05:48 |
| 2. | "Allegra" | Rita Thyagarajan | 05:23 |
| 3. | "Meow Meow" | Vikram, Priya Himesh | 04:31 |
| 4. | "Ivannee Dupe" | Vikram, Devi Sri Prasad | 04:08 |
| 5. | "Mambo Mamiya" | Vikram, Rita Thyagarajan | 04:36 |
| 6. | "Naa Peru Meenakumari" | Malathy Lakshman, Krishna Iyer | 04:20 |
| 7. | "Mallana Theme" | Devi Sri Prasad | 03:03 |
| 8. | "Mallana" (DSP mix) | Devi Sri Prasad | 03:16 |
| Total length: | | | 35:05 |

== Release ==
The original Tamil version of the film was given a "U" certificate, along with some cuts by the Indian Censor Board. Additionally, the Telugu version Mallanna was granted a U/A certificate, with a few cuts from the Board. Some theaters reduced 15 minutes of Brahmanandam's comedy from the Telugu version. Due to Raghuvaran's death, the release was postponed.

== Reception ==
=== Critical response ===
Sify reviewed that "the movie was a roller coaster ride of pure unadulterated masala. It praised Vikram and Shriya saying while Vikram rocked and the film belongs to him, Shriya sizzled throughout and carried the glamorous role with élan and the attitude". Rediff gave the film 2.5/5 stars and commented: "Watch Kandhasamy for its beautiful locales, a ravishing heroine, and Vikram's smile but go with nil expectations as this particular super-hero doesn't have much to offer a discerning viewer".

For the Telugu version Mallanna, Jeevi of Idlebrain gave the film a rating of two-and-a-half out of five and noted that "On a whole, Mallana is an example of what happens when popular screenplay goes wrong in any of Shankar's movies".

=== Box office ===
The film collected ₹ 13.7 million in the UK. In Malaysia it collected a $1,077,658 in its total run. In Chennai box office it collected ₹ 72.8 million in seven weeks.

=== Accolades ===
Amrita Mathrubhumi Award

- Best Actress – Shriya Saran

Edison Awards

- Best Public Relations Officer – Diamond Babu

Vijay Awards

The film has been nominated for the following categories:

- Favorite Hero – Vikram
- Favorite Heroine – Shriya Saran
- Favorite film – Kalaipuli S. Dhanu
- Favorite Director – Susi Ganesan
- Best Music Director – Devi Sri Prasad
- Best Art Director – Thotta Tharani
- Best Female Playback Singer – Rita
- Best Choreographer – Saravana Rajan
- Best Make Up Artistes – Nellai Shanmugam
- Best Costume Designer – Chaitanya and Sai
