= Sarjun KM =

Indian filmmaker

- Born: 3 April 1986 (age 40); Chennai, Tamil Nadu, India
- Occupations: Film director, writer
- Years active: 2017 – present

Sarjun KM is an Indian film director and writer who works in the Tamil cinema industry.

He made his directorial feature film debut with Echcharikkai – Idhu Manidhargal Nadamaadum Idam (2018).

== Career ==
Sarjun's career was launched after the release of his first independent short film.Lakshmi. The film Lakshmi was written, edited and directed by Sarjun KM. The film cast Lakshmi Priyaa Chandramouli in the lead role along with Nandan and Leo Sivadass in supporting characters. The film was distributed by Gautham Vasudev Menon through his official YouTube channel of the film production company Ondraga Entertainment on 1 November 2017. The film was critically acclaimed for the direction, but faced criticism for its storyline, which gained popularity among the general audience and media. In 2018, he directed his next short film Maa under the banner of Ondraga Entertainment, owned by director Gautham Vasudev Menon. Maa also received positive reviews.

He came out with his first feature film, a crime thriller film Echcharikkai, which was written and directed by him. The film got released on 24 August 2018. The film featured actors Sathyaraj, Varalaxmi Sarathkumar, Kishore, Yogi Babu and Vivek Rajgopal. Sarjun's next feature film project, Airaa released on 28 March 2019. The horror film revolves around a female protagonist played by Nayanthara. It also cast Kalaiyarasan and Yogi Babu in lead roles. For the first time actress Nayanthara played a dual role - Vlogger Yamuna and village girl Bhavani. Sudarshan Srinivasan (cinematographer) and Karthik Jogesh (film editor) who were in long-term collaboration with director Sarjun KM in his previous film have also worked on this project.

He directed the episode The Road That Never Ends in the three-episode anthology Addham. The story revolves around a lorry driver played by actor Jayaprakash and a teenage boy who tries to steal the money owned by the lorry driver. He directed the segment Thunintha Pin of Navarasa - an anthology web series, starring Atharvaa and Anjali which is released in Netflix.

== Filmography ==
=== Feature films ===
Year	Film	Notes
2018	Echcharikkai – Idhu Naaigal Nadamaadum Idam	
2019	Airaa	
2021	Blood Money	
2023	Burqa	

=== Short films ===
Year	Film	Notes
2017	Lakshmi	
2018	Maa	

=== TV series ===
Year	Film	Language	Notes
2020	Addham	Telugu	segment: The Road That Never Ends
2021	Navarasa	Tamil	segment: Thunindha Pinn
2025	Suzhal: The Vortex	Tamil	Season 2: Episodes 3, 4 and 5
