= Sathish Suriya =

Indian film director

- Born: 27/02/1976; India
- Occupation: Film editor

Sathish Suriya is an Indian film editor, who has worked on Tamil and Telugu-language films.

== Career ==
Sathish Suriya began his career as an editor with Indian television channel Apt TV, before choosing to join the post-production team of Mani Ratnam's production house, Madras Talkies. During his ten-year stint with the production studio, Sathish apprenticed under Sreekar Prasad and worked on productions including Five Star (2002), Aaytha Ezhuthu, Yuva (2004), Guru (2007) and Raavanan (2010). Sathish made his debut as the main editor through Priya's Kannamoochi Yenada (2009) and moved on to work on films including Naan (2012) and Oru Oorla Rendu Raja (2014). In 2016, he worked on his most high-profile project till date, when he served as the main editor in Sudha Kongara Prasad's bilingual films, Irudhi Suttru and Saala Khadoos (2016) featuring Madhavan. Despite being a bilingual shot simultaneously, Sathish worked on different cuts for both of the films to adapt to each language's nativity. He was nominated the Critics Choice Film Award for Best Editing for his work in Soorarai Pottru (2020).

== Filmography ==
=== As editor ===
- Kannamoochi Yenada (2007)
- Thiru Thiru Thuru Thuru (2009)
- Shiva Manasulo Shruti (2012)
- Naan (2012)
- Nirnayam (2013)
- Welcome Obama (2013)
- Sutta Kadhai (2013)
- Aivarattam (2014)
- Amara Kaaviyam (2014)
- Oru Oorla Rendu Raja (2014)
- Irudhi Suttru (2016)
- Saala Khadoos (2016)
- Meow (2016)
- Guru (2017)
- Kattappava Kanom (2017)
- Nibunan (2017)
- Vismaya (2017)
- Naachiyaar (2018)
- Manasuku Nachindi (2018)
- Naa Nuvve (2018)
- Varmaa (2020)
- Soorarai Pottru (2020)
- Anantham (web series) (2022)
- Visithiran (2022)
- Mathimaran (2023)
- Inspector Rishi (2024)
- Pon Ondru Kanden (2024)
- Sarfira (2024)
- Andhagan (2024)
- Goli Soda Rising (2024)
- Vanangaan (2025)
- The Verdict (2025)
- Unpaarvaiyil (2025)
- Divya Drusthi (2025; Telugu)
- Parasakthi (2026)
- Sathi Leelavathi (2026)
- Valai (Post Production)
- Inspector Rishi Season 02 (Post Production)
