= Lakshmi (2017 film) =

2017 film by Sarjun KM

- Directed by: Sarjun KM
- Written by: Sarjun KM
- Produced by: I B Karthikeyan; Sarjun KM
- Starring: Lakshmi Priyaa Chandramouli; Nandan; Leo Sivadass
- Cinematography: Sudharshan Srinivasan
- Edited by: Sarjun KM
- Music by: Sundaramurthy KS
- Production company: Big Print Pictures
- Distributed by: Ondraga Entertainment
- Release date: 1 November 2017
- Running time: 18 minutes
- Country: India
- Language: Tamil

Lakshmi is a 2017 Indian Tamil-language short film written, directed and edited by Sarjun KM, and was produced by I. B. Karthikeyan under the banner Big Print Pictures. The film stars Lakshmi Priyaa Chandramouli in the titular character along with Nandan and Leo Sivadass which revolves around the life of the protagonist Lakshmi. The film had background music composed by Sundaramurthy KS and was cinematographed by Sudarshan Srinivasan.

Lakshmi was screened at various international film festivals receiving acclaim from prominent members of the film industry. It was distributed by Gautham Vasudev Menon who released the film through the official YouTube channel of the film production company Ondraga Entertainment on 1 November 2017. The film was praised for the direction, but drew criticism for the bold storyline, which ensured its popularity among the audience.

== Plot ==
Lakshmi the protagonist of the story (Lakshmi Priyaa Chandramouli), lives a “machine-like” existence, working at home and in the printing press, cooking, cleaning, and being ‘available’ for her husband when he ‘desires’ her, before she decides to live for herself, for a single day. Kathir (Nandan), a sculptor and painter, who is a contrast to the life Lakshmi knows. He's genteel, with eyes that laugh, mouths Bharati's lines on female emancipation, is sensitive and does not shy from cooking, and cooking well for a woman he's met on the train. A dilemma arose as Lakshmi had to decide which life she had to choose - A mundane existence or one where she's celebrated.

== Cast ==
- Lakshmi Priyaa Chandramouli as Lakshmi
- Nandan as Kathir
- Leo Sivadass as Sekar
- Master Mithun
- Sasi

== Production ==
"It was an opportunity to portray a person going through emotions no one speaks about openly. Coming from where I do, it was a chance to play a character vastly different from what I am. I knew the film will be open to interpretation, but it was a great experience."

— Lakshmi Priyaa Chandramouli on playing the titular character Lakshmi, in an interview with The Hindu.

Director Sarjun KM worked as an assistant to filmmaker Mani Ratnam and A. R. Murugadoss in the past. He decided to cast Lakshmi Priyaa Chandramouli after being impressed by her work in Maya (2015), to make a short film which had the protagonist, a lower middle-class girl who faces all the issues as similar to women hailing from middle class. But Sarjun stated that her character has a rare dignity about her, whom she is good about everything, however believes in male superiority.

Sarjun KM initially wanted to include another character whose life is contrast from the protagonist, and later zeroed on his old acquaintance Nandan. He eventually stated that the script takes a bold stand on the lack of sexual satisfaction for women, and the lack of a space for couples when living in cramped dwellings.

Producer I. B. Karthikeyan agreed to fund the project at a budget of ₹70,000 and a bulk amount was spent on creating the sculpture's studio. The film was shot in three days on a Canon EOS 5D camera in and across Chennai. Goutham R. Shankar worked as the digital intermediate and according to Gautham and the film's cinematographer Sudarshan Srinivasan, the film is a mix of black-and-white and colour, as the former to showcase her mundane life and the latter to hint at possibilities.

== Soundtrack ==
The background music is composed by Sundaramurthy KS, who also composed a promotional single from the film titled "Nimirndha Nannadai", which is based on a poem written by Mahakavi Subramaniya Bharathiyar. The song had additional lyrics written by Siva Ananth and was sung by Sarjun KM and Sriradha Bharath. It was released on 11 November 2017, through all music streaming platforms and in YouTube.

Track listing
No.	Title	Lyrics	Singer(s)	Length
1.	"Nimirndha Nannadai"	Mahakavi Subramaniya Bharathiyar, Siva Ananth	Sarjun KM, Sriradha Bharath	4:08

== Reception ==
Lakshmi received mixed-to-positive response from audience. With acclaimed filmmakers Mani Ratnam and Gautham Vasudev Menon praised Sarjun for the direction and making, it received furore after ten days being uploaded on YouTube (from 1 November 2017). It received less than 50,000 views in first five days and suddenly the film got 1.5 million views overnight which triggered a massive outrage upon release. Viewers drew crtiticism against the makers for justifying an extra-marital affair, for equating women empowerment with sexual independence and also trolled the film's lead protagonist Lakshmi Priyaa Chandramouli and its director Sarjun.

In a supportive note, the chief writer of The Indian Express, Ashameera Aiyyapan stated "The controversy around Lakshmi makes us rethink how we see women on-screen [...] What people fail to understand is that at the end of the day, it is a story. A story of a middle-class woman, frustrated by her unhappy marriage, falters and gives in to temptation. It wasn’t particularly necessary, the indifference Lakshmi suffered from was pretty evident. Possibly he realised that indifference is not enough reason for a woman to err; so that audience can forgive Lakshmi easier."

Sowmya Rajendran, editor-in-chief of The News Minute wrote that "The film would have worked better if Lakshmi's self-discovery had happened because she makes that internal journey herself - this is what sets apart films like English Vinglish and Queen. Nevertheless, Lakshmi is an attempt to show a woman's desire to flout the rules to seek her own happiness." She further stated about the concept of Sindhu Bhairavi, Agni Natchathiram, Gopurangal Saivathillai and other movies that had central men characters with extra-marital relationships, which is similar to this film, but also questioned that why it was not criticised.

In response to the negative comments, Lakshmi Priyaa stated that she was thankful to all those who'd appreciated the film but that whatever she'd read out was only a small sample of all the abusive comments about her, the director, and his family that had come their way. The actor went on to say that everyone had the right to critique a film but that it shouldn't be in such a way that another human being is disrespected.
