= Pon Ondru Kanden =

2024 film directed by V. Priya

- Official release poster
- Directed by: V. Priya
- Written by: V. Priya
- Screenplay by: V. Priya; Reema Ravichander
- Produced by: Jyoti Deshpande; Yuvan Shankar Raja
- Starring: Ashok Selvan; Vasanth Ravi; Aishwarya Lekshmi
- Cinematography: AT Bagath
- Edited by: Sathish Suriya
- Music by: Yuvan Shankar Raja
- Production companies: Jio Studios; YSR Films
- Distributed by: JioCinema
- Release date: 14 April 2024
- Country: India
- Language: Tamil

Pon Ondru Kanden (transl. I saw a woman) is a 2024 Indian Tamil-language musical romantic comedy film written and directed by V. Priya and produced by Jyoti Deshpande and Yuvan Shankar Raja under the banner of Jio Studios and YSR Films. The film stars Ashok Selvan, Vasanth Ravi and Aishwarya Lekshmi. The music for the film is composed by Yuvan Shankar Raja. It was released directly via the streaming service JioCinema and the television channel Colors Tamil on 14 April 2024, during Tamil New Year. The film received negative reviews from critics.

== Plot ==
The story is about two friends, Shiva and Sai, who are invited to a reunion but don’t like each other. When they were kids, they both liked a girl named Thiripurasunthari. Shiva had older sisters. Sai’s mother was the headmaster of their school. To impress Thiripurasunthari, Shiva got her a rose and some sweets, while Sai bought fireworks and lots of roses. Shiva gave his gift first and got a kiss from her. Sai found out and got very angry, leading to a big fight. It turned out that Thiripurasunthari had kissed Sai earlier that morning too. This made them both angry towards each other.

Years later, they meet again in reunion and become friends. Shiva wanted Sai to move to Chennai for his mother’s medical treatment, and Shiva helps him. In Chennai, Sai falls in love with a chef named Sundari who is her neighbour. Shiva, who is more carefree, supports Sai. But when Sai introduces Sundari to Shiva, it’s revealed that Sundari is Shiva’s ex-wife. Sai knew Sundari was married before but didn’t know her ex-husband was Shiva.

Both Shiva and Sundari explain their marriage ended because of misunderstandings. Although Shiva and Sai promise not to fight over Sundari, they both secretly want her. Sundari likes both of them and can’t decide.

During an event in Chennai, Sundari’s father tells Sai and Shiva to make Sundari to move to Canada for a better future. Shiva and Sai had a drink and was revealing their love to her but end up arguing over her. Meanwhile Sai’s mother goes missing, but they find her after a few hours. Shiva and Sai decide to stop fighting and let the other marry Sundari.

In a twist, Thiripurasunthari shows up, having met Sai’s mother. Shiva and Sai forget about Sundari and are happy to see Thiripurasunthari again. The movie ends with everyone laughing and enjoying a family reunion.

== Cast ==
- Ashok Selvan as Shiva
- Vasanth Ravi as Sai
- Aishwarya Lekshmi as Sundari aka Sandy
- Amrutha Srinivasan as Tripura Sundari
- Sachu as Meena
- Deepa Shankar as Amudha
- Mathew Varghese as Sandy's father
- Shwetha Shekar as Prams
- Saraswathi
- Sree Kavi as Shiva's elder sister
- Amritha Lakshmi
- Smriti Parameswar as Shiva's elder sister
- Abhishek Shankar
- Param Guhanesh as young Shiva

== Production ==
In February 2024, it was announced that Ashok Selvan, Vasanth Ravi, and Aishwarya Lekshmi would be starring in a film to be directed by V. Priya. The makers decided on the title Pon Ondru Kanden after another film with the same title was dropped. Vasanth Ravi was cast as Priya felt it would be "refreshing" and different from his previous, more intense roles. Priya said she cast Aishwarya because she wanted a woman who was "strong" and "smart" but also vulnerable.

== Music ==
The music and original score is composed by Yuvan Shankar Raja, reuniting with V. Priya after 17 years since their last film Kannamoochi Yenada (2007). The audio rights were acquired by Sony Music India.The first single "Sun Light" was released on 2 April 2024. The second single "Ennammaa" was released on 5 April 2024. The third single "Sundari" was released on 9 April 2024. The last two singles "Un Azhagai Rasithu" and "Kavidhai Kottudhu" were released on 16 and 18 April 2024 respectively, after the film's release.

Track listing
No.	Title	Lyrics	Singer(s)	Length
1.	"Sun Light"	Durai	Yuvan Shankar Raja	4:06
2.	"Ennammaa"	Vignesh Ramakrishna	Yuvan Shankar Raja	3:43
3.	"Sundari"	Niranjan Bharathi	Yuvan Shankar Raja; Sathyaprakash; Jithin Raj; Kharesma Ravichandran	4:09
4.	"Un Azhagai Rasithu"	Nixy	Yuvan Shankar Raja; Haricharan	3:43
5.	"Kavidhai Kottudhu"	Siva Ananth	Yuvan Shankar Raja; Sai Vignesh	3:09

== Release ==
In March 2024, the production company Jio Studios announced that the film would have a direct-to-television premiere on Colors Tamil, rather than a theatrical release. This prompted an angry response from Vasanth Ravi who accused the producers of not informing the cast and crew in advance. The issues were later resolved to have the film release simultaneously on the streaming service JioCinema and Colors Tamil on 14 April 2024, Puthandu (Tamil New Year).

== Reception ==
Anusha Sundar of OTTPlay gave 2 1/2 stars and wrote, "Pon Ondru Kanden is a film with heart at its right place, but the one which needed just more than skin-deep characterisations". Abhinav Subramanian of The Times of India gave 1 1/2 stars and wrote, "Pon Ondru Kanden attempts to be a light-hearted romantic comedy but ends up being a confusing and unfulfilling watch". Bhuvanesh Chandar of The Hindu wrote, "Imagine watching a film anchored by adult characters who behave as if they are possessed by cartoon characters. From start to finish, the film feels like a drear fest of cardboard cut-outs of cliche archetypes". Sreejith Mullappilly of Cinema Express rated the film 2 stars out of 5 and wrote, "the fact that none of the actors takes the premise too seriously works more in favour of the film than against it, as it helps keep the tone light".
