= Airaa =

2019 film

- Poster
- Directed by: Sarjun KM
- Written by: Priyanka Ravindran
- Produced by: Kotapadi J Rajesh
- Starring: Nayanthara; Kalaiyarasan
- Cinematography: Sudarshan Srinivasan
- Edited by: Karthik Jogesh
- Music by: K. S. Sundaramurthy
- Production company: KJR Studios
- Distributed by: Trident Arts; Star Vijay (Satellite Right)
- Release date: 28 March 2019
- Running time: 142 minutes
- Country: India
- Language: Tamil

Airaa (transl. The beginning) is a 2019 Indian Tamil-language horror film written and directed by KM Sarjun. The film stars Nayanthara and Kalaiyarasan. The film is produced by Kotapadi J Rajesh under the production banner KJR Studios. The film was initially expected to be released on the eve of Christmas but the shooting wasn't completed as planned until December 2018. Nayanthara is playing a dual role in a film for the second time after Maya (2015).

== Plot ==
The film begins with Yamuna (Nayanthara), a journalist. She runs away from home to escape a marriage alliance. She meets her grandmother Parvathy (Kulappulli Leela) and stay with her. Meanwhile, Amudhan (Kalaiyarasan) is investigating a string of deaths that have been happening in the area. Meanwhile, Yamuna, Parvathy, Mani (Yogi Babu), and Mani's little nephew Babloo (Ashwanth Ashokkumar) start making fake ghost videos on YouTube.

Yamuna is being haunted by a ghost. One night, she and her grandmother are attacked by the ghost. Yamuna wakes up in a hospital at 3:33 AM and learns that her grandmother is alive but in critical condition. She finds her grandmother dead. Amudhan, who is talking to the ghost, Bhavani (Nayanthara), tells her that revenge is not important and that she should not kill people. Bhavani says her job is almost done: she just needs to kill Yamuna.

At Parvathy's funeral, Yamuna's parents criticise Mani about his idea of making the fake ghost videos. Yamuna finds out that Babloo never existed, he was just a vision and a ghost as well. She does research on Babloo and Bhavani while Amudhan tries to locate Yamuna to save her. Yamuna's research leads her to Amudhan's house and the two meet. One night, a butterfly leads Yamuna out of her bedroom and she screams in horror when she sees Bhavani and Babloo's ghosts together. She then hears her parents crying for help, only to find them sleeping.

Yamuna decides to interact with the ghost after being fed up with her haunted visions. She even goes back to the haunted house. She and Amudhan meet 2 priests who say that they will do prayers to the god, Bhairava and Amudhan must go to the cemetery, dig up Bhavani's dead body and destroy it with a trident so that Bhavani cannot use her dead body again. Amudhan succeeds and Bhavani appears but in under control by the religious chants.

As Yamuna asks why Bhavani is trying to kill her. Bhavani tells her about her past.

Bhavani's patriarch father cries upon realizing his second wife has given birth to another baby girl. As he walks out to inform their relatives, he dies by lightning. This incident causes the villagers to believe that Bhavani is cursed. Bhavani's own mother and sister hate her. During Bhavani's 16th birthday, her elder sister gives birth to a stillborn baby. Again, people believe it is because of Bhavani's "cursed" nature. Thus, Bhavani faces abuse and humiliation. She meets Amudhan at school and he falls in love with her. After Amudhan's father finds out, he sends him to college in New Delhi. Bhavani was rejected by boys willing to marry her because of her dark complexion. One night, her brother-in-law tries to sexually assault her. Bhavani's family kicks her out, believing her brother-in-law over her innocence.

Bhavani moves to Chennai and does odd jobs at a hotel. She ends up meeting Amudhan again at a restaurant. He proposes to her, and she accepts. On the day of the marriage, Bhavani finishes her shift and gets ready. Before she leaves, the owner of a beer company asks her to clean his room and to sleep with him but she says no. She tries to take the elevator in which Yamuna is present but Yamuna does not hold the door to let Bhavani in. This makes her late to the marriage office, where Amudhan is waiting. Along the way, she encounters 2 people who abuse her and steal her ring. A police officer arrests Bhavani. When the police find the real culprit, she is released. She also meets Babloo, who asks her to help him cross the street. As they do so, a drunk lorry driver hits them and kills them.

Bhavani reveals that she killed everyone who angrily disturbed her life. Yamuna now reimagines how Bhavani's life could have turned out if she had let her enter the elevator that day. Feeling remorseful, she asks Bhavani's spirit what she wants. Bhavani says that she wants Yamuna's body to live with Amudhan. Yamuna accepts it to pay for her mistake. On the day of the marriage between Bhavani and Amudhan, Bhavani possesses Yamuna and sits down for her wedding. However, Amudhan refuses to live with Bhavani using Yamuna's body. Hence, he kills himself and tells her, that they now can live together in the afterlife. Bhavani then leaves Yamuna's body. A prophetic vision shows Bhavani and Amudhan getting married at the sub-registrar office. The film ends at the cemetery, with Yamuna at Bhavani and Amudhan's graves, while the same red butterfly from Yamuna's haunted visions, flies by.

== Cast ==
- Nayanthara in a dual role as:
  - Bhavani (voice dubbed by Krithika Nelson)
  - Yamuna (voice dubbed by Deepa Venkat)
- Kalaiyarasan as Amudhan
- Yogi Babu as Mani
- Jayaprakash as Yamuna's father
- Meera Krishnan as Yamuna's mother
- Kulappulli Leela as Parvathy, Yamuna's grandmother
- Gokulnath as Francis
- Nishant Ramakrishnan as Adhi
- Ashwanth Ashokkumar as Babloo, Mani's ghost nephew
- Senthi Kumari as Bhavani's mother
- Nitish Veera as Bhavani's brother-in-law
- Maathevan as young Amudhan
- Vinod Sagar as Kullan
- Mona Bedre as Doctor
- Winner Ramachandran as Auto Rickshaw Driver
- Arun & Aravind as Priests
- Saanvitha
- Jeeva Subramanian
- Balla as Guruji
- R. S. G. Chelladurai

== Production ==
The film was announced by young filmmaker KM Sarjun who rose to prominence in Kollywood for his maiden directorial venture titled Echcharikkai which was released in late August 2018. The film marks yet another women-centric prominent role for Nayanthara. The KJR Studios decided to produce this film which also previously produced Nayanthara's political starrer Aramm. The film also marks Nayanthara's 63rd film and also this will be the first instance for her where she will play dual roles in a film. Sundaramurthy KS, Sudarshan Srinivasan and Karthik Joges were assigned as the music director, cinematographer and film editor respectively, continuing their association with the director from his previous film. The shooting of the film wrapped up in December 2018.

== Soundtrack ==
This film's music is composed by Sundarmurthy KS, and lyrics were written by Yugabharathi, Pa. Vijay, and Thamarai.

Airaa

Soundtrack album by KS Sundaramurthy
- Released: 2019
- Genre: Feature film soundtrack
- Length: 13:02
- Language: Tamil
- Producer: KS Sundaramurthy

KS Sundaramurthy chronology
| Kalavu (2018) | Airaa (2019) | Jiivi (2019) |

| No. | Title | Lyrics | Singer(s) | Length |
|---|---|---|---|---|
| 1. | "Megathoodham" | Thamarai | Padmapriya Raghavan | 4:31 |
| 2. | "Kaariga" | Madhan Karky | Sid Sriram, Rap - NAVZ-47 | 4:21 |
| 3. | "Jinthako" | Ku. Karthik | Sundaramurthy KS, Sri Radha Bharath | 4:08 |
| Total length: | | | | 13:02 |

== Release ==
The film, which had its theatrical release on 28 March 2019, received negative responses for the illogical screenplay of the film.
