= Siva Ananth =

Indian film producer

- Born: 26 October 1974 (age 51); Sivagangai, Tamil Nadu, India
- Other name: A. Sivakumar
- Education: BITS Pilani; University of Florida
- Occupations: Producer, screenwriter, lyricist, director, actor
- Years active: 1998-present

Siva Ananth (also credited as A. Sivakumar) is an Indian film writer, producer, lyricist, director and actor who predominantly works in Tamil cinema. Siva made his directorial debut with the Telugu film Chukkallo Chandrudu (2006). He later pursued career as a screenwriter, lyricist, executive producer and actor.

His role as executive producer in Ponniyin Selvan: I and Ponniyin Selvan: II, as well as the screenplay collaboration with Mani Ratnam on Chekka Chivantha Vaanam (2018) and with director James Erskine on the sports docudrama Sachin: A Billion Dreams (2017) are some of his notable works.

== Early life and education ==
Siva Ananth was born in Sivagangai, Tamil Nadu and did his schooling in Tamil medium at O. V. C School (till SSLC), Manamadurai and Ramakrishna Mission (higher secondary), Salem. Then he enrolled for Industrial Engineering at BITS Pilani, Rajasthan in 1991 and graduated by 1995. He pursued MS in Mass Communications with an ancillary in Film Theory at the University of Florida, US and graduated in 1997 after producing a thesis describing a comparative study of production technique in Hollywood and Indian Cinema.

During his time at BITS Pilani, he took up script-writing and revealed his fascination with director Mani Ratnam's work in Roja had sparked an initial interest. After submitting his thesis, he contacted Mani Ratnam and secured a position as an assistant director after being asked to write a short story. The short story "Yogi" was also later published by journal Ananda Vikatan.

== Career ==
He joined Mani Ratnam's team halfway through the shoot of Dil Se.. (1998). His first day was spent working on the production of the song Chaiyya Chaiyya, and he was also assigned to help oversee the film's sound effects. His first film as an assistant director was Alai Payuthey (2000) and he worked alongside fellow apprentice Shaad Ali, in helping Madras Talkies complete the venture. In 2001, he began his first individual project as a director, Acham Thavir starring Madhavan and Jyothika, and produced by Vikram Singh. Siva worked on the script alongside Selvaraj, with Ranjit Barot and Vinod signed as music composer and cinematographer, respectively. However Singh's financial problems meant that the film was called off 20 days into shoot, despite the team holding a schedule in Syria. Siva subsequently reverted to assisting Mani Ratnam for Aaytha Ezhuthu and Yuva (2004), while also working on directing commercials.

During the making of Acham Thavir, Siva had become acquainted with Siddharth, who had served as an assistant director and the pair subsequently regularly discussed films. After becoming an actor, Siddharth recommended Siva to producer K. S. Rama Rao in 2005, to be the director of a venture that the pair were working on. Subsequently, along with Siddharth and Kona Venkat, Siva helped developed the script for Chukkallo Chandrudu (2006), a Telugu language romantic comedy. The film also featured Siddharth, along with veteran Akkineni Nageswara Rao and three lead actresses, and released in January 2006. Described as a "sophisticated comedy film for multiplex crowds", it opened to mixed reviews and failed at the box office. Siva moved on to assist V. Priya in writing the dialogues for Kannamoochi Yenada (2007), while also working with Mani Ratnam in Guru (2007). In 2010, it was reported that Siva would make a return to directing with a Hindi project titled Bloody Paki featuring Vivek Oberoi and Genelia D'Souza, but the film eventually did not materialise.

In 2015, he appeared in a full-fledged acting role as Dulquer Salmaan's brother in Mani Ratnam's O Kadhal Kanmani. Alongside his commitments as an actor, Siva was also credited to be the head of post-production works and in the soundtrack, as an additional vocalist.

From 2017 he started focusing more on screenwriting and film production. He is one of the writers of Sachin: A Billion Dreams, a 2017 Indian documentary sports film directed by James Erskine, and co-writer of the Tamil-language crime drama film Chekka Chivantha Vaanam (2018) directed by Mani Ratnam. Siva was co-writer, executive producer and played the role of Chezhiyan in Chekka Chivantha Vaanam. He is also co-writer and executive producer of Soorma (2018), a Hindi-language biographical sports drama film based on the life of hockey player Sandeep Singh, directed by Shaad Ali.

For the film Vaanam Kottattum (2020) directed by Dhana Sekaran, Siva ventured into writing lyrics. He wrote the lyrics to the film soundtrack in collaboration with musician Sid Sriram.

Between 2019 and 2023, Siva was the "master mind behind Mani Ratnam" as executive producer of Ponniyin Selvan: I and Ponniyin Selvan: II, the screen adaption of the Tamil language historical fiction novel by Kalki Krishnamurthy Ponniyin Selvan. The first film was released in theatres worldwide on 30 September 2022. Part two was released on 28 April 2023. Creatively, he contributed the lyrics of two songs in collaboration with A. R. Rahman. Siva has called PS his most challenging film to date. His work as executive producer in this project was much acclaimed. Co-writer B. Jeyamohan dedicated his latest book to Siva, saying that “A great film like Ponniyin Selvan would not have been made without him. He was Mani Ratnam's principal assistant and the film's process producer. It is a business that normally requires a hundred hands and a thousand eyes.”

Siva is one of the producers of Thug Life (2025 film) with Kamal Haasan and Mani Ratnam.

== Filmography ==
=== As a director, writer, and producer ===
Year	Title	Director	Writer	Producer	Language	Notes
2006	Chukkallo Chandrudu	Yes	Screenplay	No	Telugu	
2007	Kannamoochi Yenada	No	Yes	No	Tamil	Credited as A. Sivakumar
2017	Kaatru Veliyidai	No	No	Executive	Tamil	
2017	Sachin: A Billion Dreams	No	Yes	No	Marathi; Hindi; English	
2018	Chekka Chivantha Vaanam	No	Yes	Executive	Tamil	
2018	Soorma	No	Yes	Executive	Hindi	
2020	Vaanam Kottatum	No	Yes	Executive	Tamil	
2022	Ponniyin Selvan: I	No	No	Executive	Tamil	
2022	Mister Mummy	No	No	Yes	Hindi	
2023	Ponniyin Selvan: II	No	No	Executive	Tamil	
2025	Thug Life	No	No	Yes	Tamil	

=== As an actor ===
Year	Title	Role	Language	Notes
2015	O Kadhal Kanmani	Vasudevan Varadarajan	Tamil	As A. Sivakumar
2017	Kaatru Veliyidai	Girish Reddy	Tamil	
2018	Chekka Chivantha Vaanam	Chezhiyan	Tamil	

=== As a lyricist ===
Year	Film	Song	Language	Ref.
2020	Vaanam Kottatum	All songs	Tamil	
2022	Ponniyin Selvan: I	"Chola Chola" & "Alaikadal"	Tamil	
2023	Ponniyin Selvan: II	"PS Anthem" & "Veera Raja Veera"	Tamil	
2024	Pon Ondru Kanden	"Kavidhai Kottudhu"	Tamil	
2025	Thug Life	"Sugar Baby", "Mutha Mazhai", "Engeyo", "Mutha Mazhai (Reprise)"	Tamil	

=== Television ===
Year	Title	Director	Writer	Producer	Language	Notes
2020	Addham	Yes	Yes	No	Telugu	Segment: The Unwhisperable Secret
2023	Sweet Kaaram Coffee	No	Dialogues	No	Tamil	
2023	Kaala	No	No	No	Hindi	Disney+ Hotstar series; as an actor
2024	Killer Soup	No	Tamil dialogues	No	Hindi; Tamil	
