= The Verdict (2025 film) =

2025 Tamil legal drama film

- Theatrical release poster
- Directed by: Krishna Sankar
- Written by: Krishna Sankar
- Produced by: Prakash Mohandas
- Starring: Suhasini Maniratnam; Varalaxmi Sarathkumar; Sruthi Hariharan
- Cinematography: Arvind Krishna
- Edited by: Sathish Suriya
- Music by: Aditya Rao
- Production company: Agni Entertainment
- Release date: 30 May 2025
- Country: India
- Language: Tamil

The Verdict is a 2025 Indian Tamil-language courtroom drama film written and directed by debutant Krishna Sankar. Prakash Mohandas produced the film under his Agni Entertainment banner, while the film stars Suhasini Maniratnam, Varalaxmi Sarathkumar and Sruthi Hariharan in the lead roles, alongside Vidyullekha Raman and Prakash Mohandas in supporting roles.

The Verdict was released in theatres on 30 May 2025.

== Cast ==
- Suhasini Maniratnam as Elisa
- Varalaxmi Sarathkumar as Maya
- Sruthi Hariharan as Namrutha
- Vidyullekha Raman
- Prakash Mohandas

== Production ==
The courtroom drama film set in the United States is written and directed by debutant Krishna Sankar and produced by Prakash Mohandas under his Agni Entertainment banner. The film stars Suhasini Maniratnam, Varalaxmi Sarathkumar and Sruthi Hariharan in the lead roles. The technical team consists of cinematographer Arvind Krishna, editor Sathish Suriya and music composer Aditya Rao. Principal photography began on September 2023 and got completed within a span of 23 days as planned while the post-production went on for about three months.

== Release ==
=== Theatrical ===
The Verdict released in theatres on 30 May 2025. Inititally it was planned for June 2024. Thekkepatt Films had acquired the distribution rights of the film in Kerala.

=== Home media ===
The Verdict began streaming on Sun NXT from 26 June 2025.

== Reception ==
Abhinav Subramanian of The Times of India gave 3.5/5 stars and wrote "Krishna Shankar shows promise in handling the thriller elements, particularly in the second half where psychological warfare replaces legal procedures. The screenplay excels at revealing character through action rather than exposition [...] The Verdict works best when it abandons the courtroom for the messier arena of human duplicity, where justice wears a different face entirely." Jayabhuvaneshwari B of The New Indian Express gave 2/5 stars and wrote "With a premise that screams potential and a competent cast, the film could have made a strong argument for itself in the courtroom drama genre. However, a muddled execution, lacklustre twists, and shaky logic undermine its case at every turn."
