= Anantham (TV series) =

Indian web series

- Poster
- Genre: Family drama
- Written by: V. Priya
- Directed by: V. Priya
- Starring: Prakash Raj; Sampath Raj; John Vijay; Vivek Prasanna; Arjunan; Mathew Varghese; Indraja; Dindigul Saravanan; Savaal Raman
- Music by: A.S.Ram
- Country of origin: India
- Original language: Tamil
- No. of seasons: 1
- No. of episodes: 8 (list of episodes)

Production
- Producer: V. Murali Raaman
- Cinematography: AT Bagath
- Editor: Sathish Suriya
- Production company: Happy Unicorn

Original release
- Network: ZEE5
- Release: 22 April 2022

Anantham (transl. infinite) is an Indian Tamil-language family drama streaming television series directed by V. Priya. Produced by Happy Unicorn the series stars Prakash Raj in the lead role along with Sampath Raj, John Vijay, Arjunan, Mathew Varghese and Indraja. The series comprised eight episodes and was released on ZEE5 on 22 April 2022.

== Synopsis ==
Anantham is a home that has sheltered several families and witnessed many life stories. When Ananth returns to Anantham, he learns about the various families who lived there since his parents moved out.

== Cast ==
- Prakash Raj as Venkatesan
  - Aravinth Sundar as Young Venkatesan
- Sampath Raj as Ananth
  - Vinoth Kishan as Young Ananth
- Indraja as Maragatham
  - Samyuktha Shanmuganathan as Young Maragatham
- John Vijay as Ramu
  - Vivek Rajgopal as Young Ramu
- Arjunan as Ramani
  - Sai Raghul as Young Ramani
- Mathew Varghese as Ramasamy
  - Anbu Thasan as Young Ramasamy
- Sree Kavi as Sundari
  - Namita krishnamurthy as Young Sundari
- Amrutha Srinivasan as Seetha
- Vivek Prasanna as Sandeep Sekaran
- Mekha as Rekha
- Madhuri Watts as Chitra
- Anjali Rao as Lalitha
- Abishek Joseph George as Balakrishnan
  - Param Guganesh as Young Balu
- George Kora as Krishnan Menon.
- Lakshmi Gopalaswamy as Saroja
- Vinodhini as Shailaja
- Ananya Ramprasad as Sujatha
- Mirna Menon as Parvathy
  - Kanishka as Young Paravathy
- Laguparan as Chander
- Anusha Swamy as Kavitha
- Dindigul Saravanan as Maali
- Rohini as Voice of Anantham

== Reception ==
The series opened to positive reviews. Navein Darshan of The Indian Express rated the series with 3.5/5 stars, stating that, "Anantham is an endearing series, despite the blemishes. During a crucial moment in the series, Venkatesan [Prakash Raj] speaks of the importance of dying without regret or guilt; he thinks of it as the perfect ending. Likewise, the climax of a story and the emotion it leaves you with is equally important. Unfortunately, Anantham bypasses its golden moment for conclusion and instead chooses to leave us with an ineffective cliffhanger. Well, at least, Venkatesan gets a satisfying end." Soundarya Athimuthu of The Quint told, "Anantham' is an endearing series about acceptance with gold intentions despite its imperfections. It makes you feel at home with its underlying theme to accept with love despite imperfections. As an audience member, one tends to love Anantham for its gold intentions despite its imperfections." S.Subhakeerthana of OTTPlay said, "There is a lot of heart in Anantham though often it gets stuck in melodrama. Nevertheless I recommend that you watch this thoughtful web series [sic]." Ashameera Aiyappan of Firstpost wrote, "Anantham, even in the weaker portions, is thoughtful, inclusive, and shows a lot of heart. It is not perfect. Its murals are often cut into by snakey cracks. It ends on a cliffhanger that feels forced. But even in the weaker portions, the film is thoughtful, inclusive, and shows a lot of heart. For that, my love for Anantham is infinite."

== Episodes ==
No. overall	No. in season	Title	Directed by	Original release date
1	1	"Maragatham"	V. Priya	22 April 2022
Ananth, a successful writer, unwillingly revisits his family home. Meanwhile, an estranged father dives into the past to learn about the journey of Venkatesan and his wife Maragatham in their home called 'Anantham'.
2	2	"Seetha"	V. Priya	22 April 2022
Ananth learns the story of a married couple who lived in the house in 1971- Sundar and his visually impaired wife, Seetha. He witnesses Seetha's plight during the days she spent within the walls of Anantham.
3	3	"Rekha"	V. Priya	22 April 2022
Set in 1975, witness the struggling lives of Sandeep, an IIT graduate, his happy-go-lucky wife, and their two children.
4	4	"Ananth"	V. Priya	22 April 2022
Ananth recalls the first time he fell in love in 1985 and how it changed his life forever.
5	5	"Krishnan Menon"	V. Priya	22 April 2022
Three beautiful woman living in 'Anantham' experience laughter and love after Krishnan Menon, a new paying guest, moves into their home.
6	6	"Lalitha"	V. Priya	22 April 2022
Tenants Lalitha and Balu return to stay in Anantham. But will they have a peaceful stay at Anantham despite the horrible sins committed during their previous stay?
7	7	"Parvathy"	V. Priya	22 April 2022
Ananth meets a young psychotherapist, Parvathy who tells him about her painful journey and how she broke barriers and embraced her true potential while living at Anantham.
8	8	"Venkatesan"	V. Priya	22 April 2022
Venkatesan returns home to spend his remaining days at Anantham. As he nears his end, will he reconcile with his son and embrace peace?
