= Ilakkiya =

2022-Indian television series

- Genre: Drama
- Created by: Saregama
- Written by: C.U Muthuselvan; Anil Nagpal; Kavita Nagpal (Hindi adaptation writer); Dialogues; Guru Sampath Kumar; Palani Swamy
- Screenplay by: "Kalaimamani" Sekkizhar
- Directed by: Sai Marudhu (1–221); G.Stalin Iniyan (222–314); Natarajan (315–813); A.P.Rajendran (814–985)
- Starring: Shambhavi Gurumoorthy; Nandan Loganathan
- Theme music composer: Dharan Kumar
- Opening theme: "Vaazha Ninaithaal Vaazhalam"; M. M. Manasi; Ravi (vocals); Kannadasan (lyrics)
- Country of origin: India
- Original language: Tamil
- No. of seasons: 1
- No. of episodes: 985

Production
- Producer: Saregama India
- Cinematography: Akilan
- Editor: Vinoth.S
- Camera setup: Multi-camera
- Running time: approx. 19–22 minutes per episode
- Production company: Saregama

Original release
- Network: Sun TV
- Release: 10 October 2022 – 14 January 2026

Related
- Mangalyam Thanthunanena; Tujhi Majhi Jamali Jodi

Ilakkiya is an Indian Tamil-language television series starring Shambhavy Gurumoorthy and Nandan Loganathan in lead roles. The series was produced by Saregama. It was premiered on 10 October 2022 and ended on 14 January 2026, along with Anandha Ragam as both of them were replaced by Iru Malargal serial. Ilakkiya aired on Sun TV at 2pm from Monday to Saturday, replacing the longest running tamil serial, Chandralekha. It is also available on the digital platform Sun NXT. To celebrate the completion of the TV series, many cast from the serial came to Ranjithame Season 4 episode 20.

== Plot ==
Ilakkiya is a popular Tamil TV serial on Sun TV about a kind-hearted girl named Ilakkiya who finds joy in others' happiness, marries her friend Gautham, but faces intense challenges, family politics, and scheming from his aunt Bairavi and cousin Anjali, focusing on her struggles to maintain her values amidst adversity, especially concerning her family's situations and relationships.

== Cast ==
=== Main ===
- Hima Bindu → Sambhavi Gurumoorthy as Illakiya Gautham: Lakshmi's daughter; Gautham's wife
- Nandan Loganathan as Gautham SSK: SSK and Revathi's biological son; Illakiya's husband

=== Recurring ===
- Roopa Sree → Gayatri Shastri as Janaki Venkataraman: Gautham's foster mother
- Rani → Priya Prince as Bhairavi: Gautham's foster aunt
- Sushma Nair as Anjali Karthik: Illakiya's cousin; Karthik's wife
- Jay Srinivas Kumar → Aravish as Karthik Venkataraman: Gautham's adopted brother
- Rajeshwari as Revathi SSK: Gautham's biological mother
- Saakshi Siva as SSK: Gautham's biological father
- Shanthi Arvind → Banumathi as Dhatchayini SSK: Gautham's step mother, SSK’s wife
- Meena Vemuri as Chintamani: Anjali's mother, Ilakkiya and Vasanth’s aunt, Masilamani’s wife, Karthik’s mother in law
- Satheesh Kumar as Masilamani: Anjali's father, Ilakkiya and Vasanth’s uncle, Lakshmi’s elder brother, Chintamani’s husband, Karthik’s father in law
- Gayathri Priya as Lakshmi: Illakiya and Vasanth’s mother, Chintamani’s sister in law, Masilamani’s younger sister, Anjali’s aunt, Gowtham’s mother in law
- Sahil Singh as Vasanth: Illakiya's brother, Lakshmi’s son, Anjali’s cousin, Masilamani’s nephew
- Bharat Kalyan as Venkataraman: Gautham's foster father, Janaki’s husband, Bhairavi’s elder brother, a businessman, Aishwarya and Karthik’s father, ilakkiya’s foster father in law, Anjali’s father in law
- Harsha Harish as Aishwarya Venkataraman: Gautham's step sister, Karthik’s sister Venkatraman and Janaki Venkatraman’s daughter, Bhairavi’s niece, Ilakkiya’s step sister in law, Anjali’s sister in law
- Sathya Rajaa: As Mahesh: Anjali's fiancée who tricked her and was about to sell her to someone
- Sonia Vikram as Priya: Karthik's fiancé, Gowtham’s friend’s younger sister
- Maanas Chavali as Murali: Ilakkiya’s one sided lover
- Delhi Ganesh as Astrologer

== Production ==
=== Casting ===
Nandan Loganathan was cast in the male lead role as Gowtham and Hima Bindu was cast as the female lead role as Ilakkiya. At the end of December 2023, actress Hima Bindu quit the series and was replaced by Shambhavy Gurumoorthy as Ilakkiya. Roopa Sree was cast as Janaki but she quit the series and was replaced by Gayathiri Shashtry. Bharath Kalyan was cast as Venkataraman Karthik and Aishwarya's father.

Rani was selected to portray the role of Bhairavi (Gowtham's aunt) who played a negative role, but in January 2023 she quit the series and was replaced by Priya Prince. and Sushma Nair was cast as Anjali in a negative role. In July 2023, Jay Srinivas Kumar quit the series and was replaced by Aravish Kumar as Karthik.

== Soundtrack ==
Track list
No.	Title	Lyrics	Music	Artist	Length
1.	"Vaazha Ninaithaal Vaazhalam வாழ நினைத்தால் வாழலாம்"	Kannadasan	Dharan Kumar	M. M. Manasi, Ravi	3:00

== Adaptations ==
Language	Title	Original release	Network(s)	Last aired	Notes	Ref.
Tamil	Ilakkiya இலக்கியா	10 October 2022	Sun TV	17 January 2026	Original	
Marathi	Tujhi Majhi Jamali Jodi तुझी माझी जमली जोडी	11 December 2023	Sun Marathi	13 July 2025	Remake	
Malayalam	Mangalyam Thanthunanena മാംഗല്യം തന്തുനാനേന	5 February 2024	Surya TV	28 June 2026	Remake	
