= Kannamoochi Yenada =

- Poster
- Directed by: V. Priya
- Written by: V. Priya; Siva Ananth
- Produced by: Radhika Sarathkumar; Zarine Screwvala; P. S. Saminathan
- Starring: Sathyaraj; Prithviraj Sukumaran; Radhika Sarathkumar; Sandhya
- Cinematography: Preetha Jayaraman
- Edited by: Sathish Suriya
- Music by: Yuvan Shankar Raja
- Production companies: Raadan Media Works; UTV Motion Pictures; Pyramid Saimira
- Distributed by: Raadan Media Works; UTV Motion Pictures; Pyramid Saimira
- Release date: 8 November 2007
- Running time: 133 minutes
- Country: India
- Language: Tamil

Kannamoochi Yenada? (transl. Why Hide and Seek?) is a 2007 Indian Tamil-language romantic comedy film written and directed by V. Priya. The film stars Sathyaraj, Prithviraj Sukumaran, Radhika Sarathkumar, and Sandhya, with Sripriya, Radha Ravi and Manobala in supporting roles. The film's score and soundtrack is composed by Yuvan Shankar Raja.

The film, a remake of the 2005 American film Guess Who, which itself is based on the 1967 American film Guess Who's Coming to Dinner, was jointly produced and distributed by Raadan Media Works, UTV, and Pyramid Saimira. The music was composed by Yuvan Shankar Raja with cinematography by Preetha Jayaraman and editing by Sathish Suriya. It released on 8 November 2007 during Deepavali. The film's title was inspired from a song from Kandukondain Kandukondain.

== Plot ==
Harish Venkatraman, a software architect who lives in Malaysia, is the millionaire nephew of Maheswaran Iyer. Having lost his parents early in life, he runs his uncle's business with impressive results. He stumbles upon the psychiatry student Devasena in the most cinematic manner and falls for her that very instant. Deva is the daughter of Commissioner Arumugam Gounder and Dhamayanthi in Chennai. As the plot progresses, Deva is being summoned by her parents for their silver jubilee wedding anniversary back home. Although he has a flourishing business to attend to and much to the wrath of his uncle (who arranges his wedding with his business partner's daughter), Harish takes the next flight to Chennai to accompany Deva. He is subjected to a warm welcome by Dhamayanthi and a cold shoulder by Arumugam. To make matters worse, Maheswaran's vicious character assassination (in the name of a complaint he sends to the police commissioner's office) does not help Harish gain enough confidence with his girlfriend's parents. Will Harish win his love back, now that his chance of impressing Deva's parents is doomed?

== Cast ==
- Sathyaraj as Commissioner Arumugam
- Prithviraj Sukumaran as Harish Venkatraman
- Radhika Sarathkumar as Dhamayanthi
- Sandhya as Devasena
- Sripriya as Seetha
- Radha Ravi as Maheswaran Iyer
- Manobala as Senthilkannu
- Sundaram as Arumugam's father
- Mahanadhi Shankar as Vellaichamy (cameo appearance)
- Mayilsamy (cameo appearance)

== Soundtrack ==
The music was scored by Yuvan Shankar Raja, teaming up with director V. Priya again after Kanda Naal Mudhal (2005). The soundtrack was released on 23 August 2007 by Vivek Oberoi. It features five songs, including a retune of the song "Andru Vandhadhum" from the 1963 film Periya Idathu Penn. Lyrics were provided by Thamarai.

Track listing
No.	Title	Singer(s)	Length
1.	"Megam Megam"	Haricharan, Shweta Mohan	5:05
2.	"Kannammoochi Aattam"	Palghat Sriram, Saindhavi, Prasanna, Dr. Narayanan	3:55
3.	"Andru Vandhadhum"	Shankar Mahadevan, Haricharan, Shweta Mohan	3:48
4.	"Putham Pudhu"	Shankar Mahadevan, Vijay Yesudas	3:56
5.	"Sanjaram Seiyyum"	Shankar Mahadevan, Madhushree	4:54
Total length:			21:38

== Critical reception ==
Sify wrote, "On the whole, the first half wins you over with its simple charm, its immensely likeable characters, and the intrinsic humour in the writing. But the latter half is too long, contrived and predictable to the extent of being seriously boring. In the final analysis, however, these are a few wrong turns in an otherwise entertaining film that'll bring a smile to your face". Aarani Yuvaraj of Kalki wrote the film moves smoothly without hiccups, praised the humour but panned the songs, lyrics and song placements and cinematography. Malini Mannath of Chennai Online wrote, "Director Priya's debut venture 'Kanda Naal Mudhal' was a classy, sensibly handled film. 'Kannamoochi...' comes as a disappointment, the director not quite in tune with or comfortable in the genre she has chosen".
