= Anand Krishnamoorthi =

Indian film sound designer

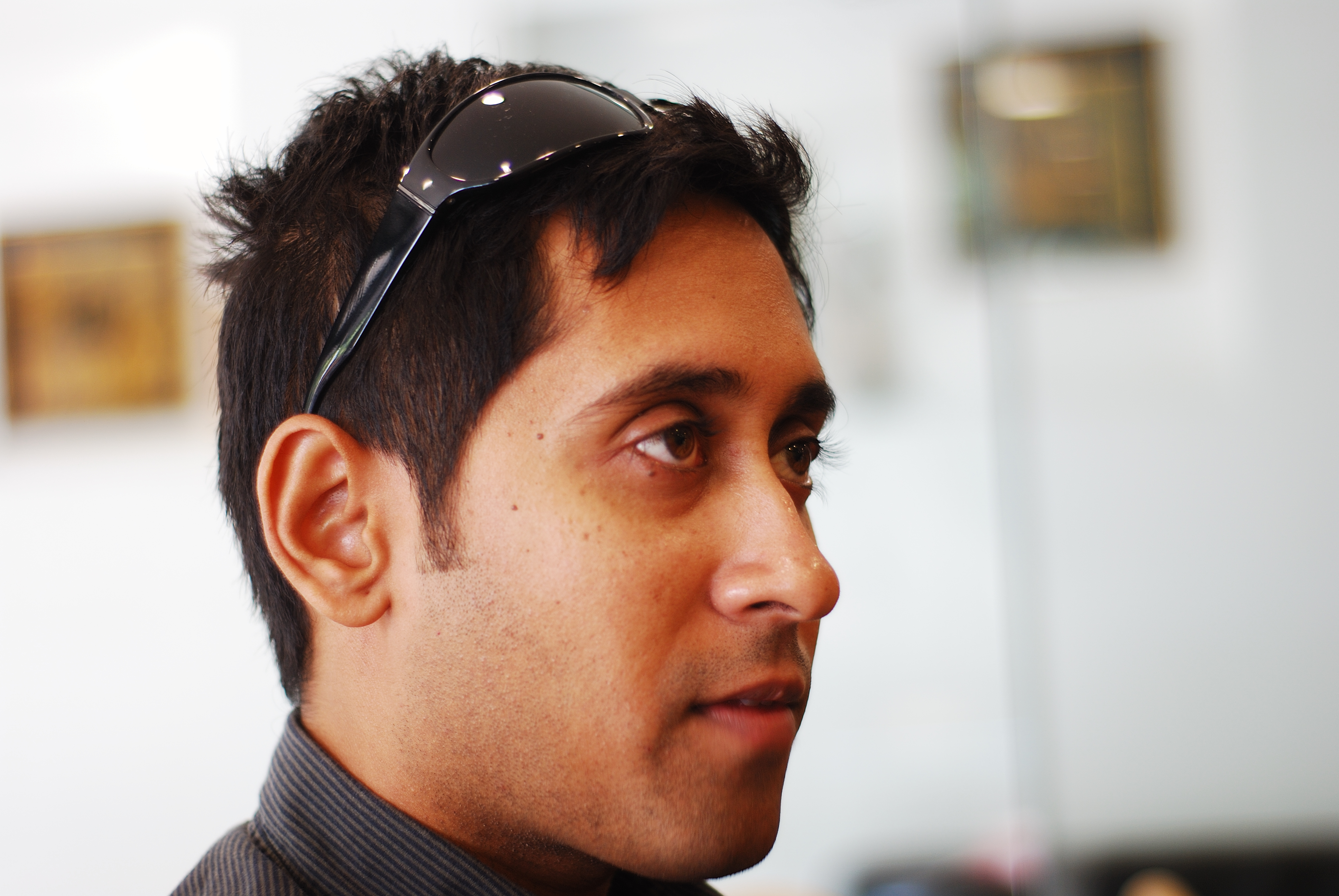
- Anand Krishnamoorthi in Chennai
- Occupations: Sound designer, sound editor, Production sound mixer, Actor, Screenwriter
- Years active: 1990–present

Anand Krishnamoorthi is an Indian film sound designer, sound editor, production sound mixer and former actor.

== Early life ==
Anand first appeared in Mani Ratnam's film Anjali and later made appearances in several other films, notably May Madham, Sathi Leelavathi, Aasai, Thalapathi and several Tamil TV Serials till 1995.

== Education ==
Anand obtained a BSc in Visual Communication from the Loyola College, Chennai and a MSc in Electronic Media from the Anna University, Chennai. He later obtained an MA in Film and Television Production from the University of Bristol in 2005.

== Career ==
Krishnamoorthi assisted Tamil Film Director Balu Mahendra from 2001-2002. After his M.A., Krishnamoorthi also worked as a Sound Trainee with the British Broadcasting Corporation from 2005-2006.

Krishnamoorthi reentered mainstream Tamil Cinema as a Production Mixer for Marmayogi which was later shelved after pre production in 2008. He then handled Dialogue Editing and Sound for Unnaipol Oruvan in 2009 wherein he also made a brief appearance on screen as an IIT dropout turned hacker.

Krishnamoorthi was the Supervising Sound Editor on Vishwaroopam, directed by Kamal Haasan, which was produced in Auro 3D format. He later led the ADR for the popular film Kalyana Samayal Saadham. He co-directed On a Quest, a film produced by the Chinmaya Mission on the life of Chinmayananda Saraswati.

Since 2015, he has led the sound design of Madras Talkies projects starting with O Kadal Kanmani, Kaatru Veliyidai, Chekka Chivantha Vaanam, the Payasam: Bheebatsa segment of the anthology Navarasa. In 2017, he was the sound designer for AR Murugadoss's action thriller Spyder and 2018, led the sound design on Director Vasanth's Sivaranjaniyum Innum Sila Pengalum which was notable for having no background score and reliant entirely upon sound design and effects. Notably, Krishnamoorthi was the Sound Designer of both films of the blockbuster series Ponniyin Selvan and will also serve as sound designer on the upcoming Thug Life.

Since 2020, Anand has been editing the podcast "The Moving Curve", hosted by Rukmini S, a data journalist based in Chennai, on COVID-19 related data in India. In 2020 this podcast was awarded the Emergent Ventures Covid-19 India Prize by Marginal Revolution.

In August 2024, it was announced that Anand had received the National Award for Sound Designing for Ponniyin Selvan Part 1.

== Filmography ==
Sound designer

- Unnaipol Oruvan (2009) (dialogue editing) (sound design)
- Manmadhan Ambu (2010) (supervising sound editor) (sound recordist)
- Shadows of Silence (2010) (sound editor)
- Vishwaroopam (2013) (sound editor)
- Kalyana Samayal Saadham (2013) (ADR)
- On a quest (2014) (co-director)
- O Kadhal Kanmani (2015) (Sound Designer)
- Kuttrame Thandanai (2016) (Supervising Sound Editor)
- Spyder (2017) (Sound designer)
- Kaatru Veliyidai (2017) (Supervising Sound Editor)
- Chekka Chivantha Vaanam (2018) (Audiographer)
- Payasam: Bhibatsa (2021) (Sound Designer)
- Sivaranjiniyum Innum Sila Pengalum (2021) (Sound Designer)
- Ponniyin Selvan (2022 and 2023) (Sound Designer)
- Raghu Thatha (audiographer)
- Thug Life

Actor

- Anjali (1990)
- Thalapathi (1991)
- Thalaivasal (1992)
- May Madham (1994)
- Sathi Leelavathi (1995)
- Aasai (1995)
- Unnaipol Oruvan (2009)
