= Jasper (film) =

2022 Tamil language drama film

- Theatrical release poster
- Directed by: Yuvaraj D
- Written by: Yuvaraj D
- Produced by: Manikandan C
- Starring: Vivek Rajgopal; Aishwarya Dutta; Lavanya
- Cinematography: S.manikanda Raja
- Edited by: Abhilash Balachandran
- Music by: Kumaran Sivamani
- Production company: Viswaroopi Film Corporation
- Release date: 23 December 2022
- Running time: 139 minutes
- Country: India
- Language: Tamil

Jasper is a 2022 Indian Tamil-language gangster film directed by Yuvaraj D, and starring Vivek Rajgopal, Aishwarya Dutta and Lavanya. It was released on 23 December 2022.

== Cast ==
- Vivek Rajgopal as Jasper
- Aishwarya Dutta as Seema
- Lavanya as Vineesha
- Raj Kalesh as Pastor Edward

== Soundtrack ==
The film's background score was composed by Kumaran, son of noted percussionist Drums Sivamani.

== Reception ==
The film was released on 23 December 2022 across Tamil Nadu. A critic from Maalaimalar gave a mixed review. A reviewer from Dina Thanthi noted that the director should have taken further care of his work. Critic Malini Mannath noted it was "a fairly interesting watch, Jasper could be an ideal fare for those satiated with the formulaic scenario and wish to view something different."
