= Velvet Nagaram =

2020 Indian Tamil language psychological thriller film

- Theatrical release poster
- Directed by: Manojkumar Natarajan
- Written by: Manojkumar Natarajan
- Produced by: Arun Karthik
- Starring: Varalaxmi Sarathkumar; Ramesh Thilak
- Cinematography: Bagath Kumar
- Edited by: Raymond Derrich Crasta
- Music by: Achu Rajamani; Saran Raghavan
- Production company: Makers Studios
- Release date: 6 March 2020
- Running time: 102 minutes
- Country: India
- Language: Tamil

Velvet Nagaram (transl. Velvet City) is a 2020 Indian Tamil language psychological thriller film written and directed by Manojkumar Natarajan on his directorial debut. The film casts Varalaxmi Sarathkumar in the lead role. The film is bankrolled by Arun Karthik's Makers Studios. Achu Rajamani and Saran Raghavan composed music for the film. The film had its theatrical release on 6 March 2020 and received mixed to negative reviews from critics.

== Plot ==
The movie starts with Usha and her brother Deepak traveling in a car to a place. In the flashback we are shown that actress Gowri is Usha's friend who is a reporter. Gowri helps a tribal village as a social activist. For some unknown clear reason, Gowri is killed in her home. Usha wants to know what happened to her friend, so she travels with Deepak to Gowri's home to find the truth. In the crime scene, she is not allowed inside the home as two police officers are stationed there who prevent the outsiders from entering the crime scene. Usha and Deepak wait for the whole day, but are still not allowed inside, hence they decide to go from there. From there, the siblings reach their friend Priya and her husband Mugilan's home. Reaching there, Usha learns that Gowri visited them sometime back and it was just a brief visit. The next day, Mugilan invites Deepak for a pub for a party and hands over the keys to their home for the siblings as the pair will reach home late.

In another place, a pair of thieves are introduced. They rob homes and lead their life under a powerful goon for their living. The gang one by one wants to be out of their leader. Hence, they plot against each other.

Usha visits the police station to have a word with the prime suspect of Gowri's murder. With the help of Inspector Guru, she has few minutes of conversation with the prime suspect, Gautham, and learns that before her murder, Gowri got a document with some vital information about the tribal people who were murdered. Usha learns that the people who wanted the file were the people who murdered Gowri.

That evening, when Mugilan and Priya are in the pub, the thieves are also in the same pub enjoying themselves. Mugilan excuses himself to use the restroom and hears a muffling sound in one of the closed stalls. When he bangs the door, he learns that one of the thieves, Shankar, was trying to rape a girl inside the bathroom. The girl runs away and Shankar begins to beat Mugilan. Both of them have a fist fight, and Shankar's gang calls him outside from the building.

Usha and her brother begin to search Priya's home for the document, thinking that Gowri might have kept them there when she got death threats. In the pub, Shankar asks his hand to get inside the pub and beat Mugilan to teach him a lesson for messing with him. His gang initially refuses but later agrees. Shankar sees that Mugilan and Priya are leaving the pub in their car and decides to follow them back to their home.

In the home, the siblings and the married couple are present when the doorbell rings. Mugilan and Deepak meet the gang members who are angry and begin to attack the guys and they barge inside, taking the couple and siblings as hostages. Shankar beats Mugilan mercilessly, and they force them to give money and valuable things. They find out that Mugilan owns several petrol bunks and asks him to give the money of the bunks, that days collection. Mugilan calls his manager and asks to give the money to his friends. Two of the gang members leave with Deepak as their hostage to get the money while three gang members keep on troubling the hostages in the home.

Shankar breaks Mugilan's legs in a fit of anger and keeps on torturing him.

A police arrives their home with a complaint that their neighbours have filed against them. The gangsters manage to thrash the police and lock him up in a room.Meanwhile, Dilli one of the thieves does first aid to muligan.

== Cast ==
- Varalaxmi Sarathkumar as Usha
- Kasthuri Shankar as Gowri
- Ramesh Thilak as Dilli
- Arjai as Michael
- Benito Alex as Shankar
- Santhosh Krishna as Selvam
- Pradeep Benetto Rayan as Mugilan
- Maalavika Sundar as Priya
- Prakash Raghavan as Deepak
- Kannan Ponnaiya as Chittappa
- Kumar Gangappan as Rocket
- Madhankumar Dhakshinamoorthy as Inspector Gurumoorthy
- Barath Neelakantan
- Porko as Baskar
- Telephone Raj as Watchman
- Emil Joe Antony as Gangster
- Vyshnav Ajithan as Gangster

== Production ==
The director on his debut film, mentioned that the film is based on a true story which happened in Kodaikanal in 2010.
