= Angels (2014 film) =

- Directed by: Jean Markose
- Written by: Jean Markose; Toni Tomy
- Produced by: Hisham Basheer; Linu Issac; Saju Azad; Maya Kartha
- Starring: Indrajith Sukumaran; Joy Mathew; Asha Sarath; Baiju; Prem Prakash; Vijayakumar; Lakshmi Priyaa Chandramouli
- Cinematography: Sujith Sarang
- Edited by: Sreejith Sarang
- Music by: Jakes Bejoy
- Production company: Cloud4Cinema
- Release date: 28 November 2014
- Country: India
- Language: Malayalam

Angels is a 2014 Indian Malayalam-language social thriller film inspired by the 2012 South Korean film Confession of Murder directed by debutant Jean Markose. The film stars an ensemble cast consisting of Indrajith Sukumaran, Asha Sarath, Joy Mathew, Baiju, Prem Prakash, Vijayakumar, and Lakshmi Priyaa Chandramouli. The screenplay was written by Jean Markose and Toni Tomy, with dialogues co-written by Shabu Kilithatil.

== Plot ==
SP Hameem Hyder is a brilliant police officer in the Special Armed Police Department. He does his work efficiently but is an egoist to some extent. Due to external pressures, he is forced to step aside from a case he has been dealing with. He is offended by this and wants to take revenge on those behind forcing his recusal. His earlier crime investigation becomes the focus of the reality crime show Views 24x7, and it is at this juncture that priest Varghese Punyaalan and Journalist Haritha Menon enter his life. Both of them want to know about Hyder and his earlier investigations, but their interests are unrelated and have different motivations. In their attempts to attain their goal, each becomes aware of the other, and the resulting conflict builds the rest of the storyline.

== Cast ==
- Indrajith Sukumaran as SP Hameem Hyder IPS
- Asha Sarath as TV anchor Haritha Menon
- Joy Mathew as Fr. Varghese Punyalan
- Baiju as SP Ashok Kumar IPS
- Prem Prakash as Channel Production Head Sebastian Padayattil
- Vijayakumar as SI Poly
- Lakshmi Priyaa Chandramouli as Zaina
- Dinesh Panicker as DIG Rajan Punnose IPS
- Aneesh G Menon as Rishi
- Parvathi Menon as Princess Malavika
- Anjali Aneesh as Nandita
- Thara Kalyan as Dr. Sandra Mary
- Indrans as attender
- Baby Annie as Jency Jacob
- Parvathy R. Krishna
- Lakshmi Sanal
- Majid as Bishop
- Jobi Varghese (cameo appearance)

== Soundtrack ==
The film's music was composed by Jakes Bejoy, with lyrics penned by Rafeeq Ahamed and Manoj Kuroor.

#	Title	Lyricist	Performer(s)
1	An Unusual Guest	—	—
2	Ee Mizhiyimakal	Rafeeq Ahamed	Indrajith Sukumaran
3	Etho Naavikar	Rafeeq Ahamed	Jakes Bejoy, Gayathri Ashokan
4	Irul Mazhayil	Manoj Kuroor	Arvind Venugopal
5	Irulmazhayil (Reprise)	Manoj Kuroor	Arvind Venugopal
6	Theme Song	—	—

== Production ==
Filming took place at Chitranjali Studios in Thiruvananthapuram. The film is Produced by Linu Issac, Hisham Basheer, Saju Azad, Maya Kartha under the banner of Cloud 4 Cinemas. Music is composed by Jakes Bejoy, with Sujith Sarang as cinematographer and Sreejith Sarang as editor. Principal filming completed on 5 June 2014. During filming, there was a shoot day when director Jean Markose was incapacitated due to a high fever, and Indrajith stepped in to temporarily direct a hospital scene featuring Tara Kalyan. Film producer Linu Issac stated "Indran (Indrajith) rocked it."

Jean Markose is a radio jockey from Dubai and has directed several short films in Dubai. He narrated the script to Indrajith, his wife's cousin, who "immediately signed the deal with a handshake" as he liked the "powerful social message" it had. According to director Markose, the film is a "social thriller that revolves around ‘Views 24x7,’ a popular crime and investigative show". Indrajith's role is that of a police officer who was tagged as a "loser" and hence different from other traditional cop roles. Asha Sarath was signed to play a journalist named Haritha, with the actress stating that Haritha was "as unscrupulous as Geetha", her character in Drishyam.
