= Arvind Venugopal =

Indian playback singer

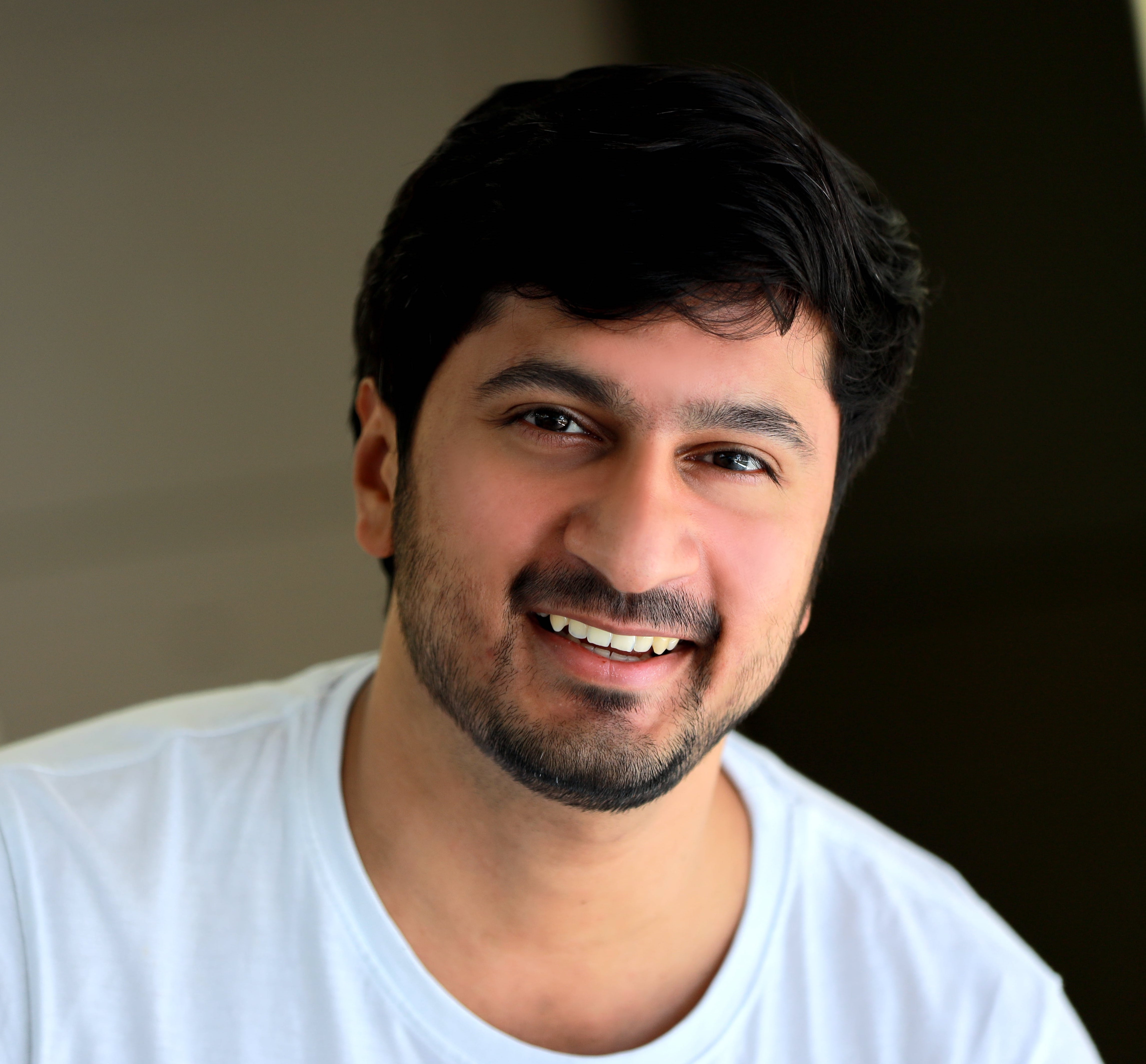
- Arvind Venugopal

Background information
- Born: 28 September 1991 (age 34)
- Origin: Thiruvananthapuram
- Occupations: Playback singer, assistant director
- Years active: 2011–present
- Website: arvindvenu.com

Arvind Venugopal (born 28 September 1991) is an Indian playback singer who predominantly works in the Malayalam film industry. He started his singing career in the year 2011 with the song "Chirakingu Vanamingu" from the film The Train composed by popular singer/composer Srinivas. He has since sung in various Malayalam films including Natholi Oru Cheriya Meenalla, Angels, Sunday Holiday, Luca, Hridayam and others. He worked on Koode as an assistant director to director Anjali Menon.

== Personal life ==
Arvind Venugopal was born in Thiruvananthapuram, Kerala. He is the son of famous Malayalam singer, G. Venugopal and Reshmi Venugopal. Popular singers Sujatha and Shweta Mohan are his aunt and cousin respectively. Arvind got engaged to actress and model Sneha Ajith on 23 September 2025.

== Education ==
Arvind is an alumnus of St. Thomas Central School (Trivandrum). He did his Bachelors at Madras Christian College (Chennai) & went on to pursue a Masters degree at Christ University (Bangalore) & New York Film Academy.

== Career ==
Arvind started singing during his college days in Chennai and was a regular sight at inter-collegiate cultural fests where he would participate along with his band. He was first called to sing in the 2011 movie The Train by the film's composer Srinivas. He sang the song "Chirakingu Vanamingu" along with Sharanya Srinivas. His next song was "Kannadi Chillil Minnum" for the 2012 movie Natholi Oru Cheriya Meenalla. His other works include "Irul Mazhayil" from the movie Angels, "Nee Akaleyano" from My Life Partner, "Mazha Paadum" from Sunday Holiday (for which he received the best duet of the year award along with his co-singer/actor Aparna Balamurali presented by Manorama Music Awards 2018 & Red FM Music Awards 2018) ,"Vanil Chandrika" from the 2019 film Luca,"Nagumo" and "Nagumo Revival" from the 2022 film Hridayam and then sang three song in Kannada for the film Monsoon Raaga.His Telugu Debut is through the song "Athiloka Komalangi" in 2024. Apart from playback singing, Arvind is known for his cover versions of popular Malayalam & Tamil songs that he has performed for the show 'Music Mojo' aired on Kappa TV.

== Discography & Filmography ==
=== Discography ===
#	Song	Film	Language	Year	Notes
1	Chirakengu	The Train	Malayalam	2011	Debut
2	Kannadi Chillil	Natholi Oru Cheriya Meenalla	Malayalam	2013	
3	Idhu Preethina	Teenage	Kannada	2013	
4	Nee Akaleyano	My Life Partner	Malayalam	2014	
5	Irul Mazhayil	Angels (2014 film)	Malayalam	2014	
6	Mazha Paadum	Sunday Holiday	Malayalam	2017	2 awards and 1 nomination
7	Manninte Manamulla	Oru Nakshatramulla Aakasham	Malayalam	2019	
8	Vanil Chandrika	Luca (2019 film)	Malayalam	2019	
9	Kanmani Nin Chiri	Kuttiyappanum Daivadhootharum	Malayalam	2020	
10	Mizhikonil Kadal	Kunjeldho	Malayalam	2021	
11	Nagumo (composition and lyrics of Tyagaraja)	Hridayam	Malayalam	2022	
12	Nagumo Revival (composition by Tyagaraja)	Hridayam	Malayalam	2022	
13	Megharajana Raaga	Monsoon Raga	Kannada	2022	
14	Hombisilina	Monsoon Raga	Kannada	2022	
15	Jagamagiso Sakhi (Bit Song)	Monsoon Raga	Kannada	2022	
16	Muthe Innen	Enkilum Chandrike	Malayalam	2023	
17	Oru Nokkil	Madhura Manohara Moham	Malayalam	2023	
18	Kanathirunal	Mehfil	Malayalam	2023	
19	Pullanguzhal	Mehfil	Malayalam	2023	
20	Nilavuthulli	Kunjamminis Hospital	Malayalam	2023	
21	Puthumazhayil Nee	Apposthalanmarude Pravarthikal	Malayalam	2023	
22	Vinoram Megangal	Aromalinte Aadhyathe Pranayam	Malayalam	2023	
23	Kayampoovin Kannil	Nadhikalil Sundari Yamuna	Malayalam	2023	
24	Mazhamukilazhake	Kaathu Kathoru Kalyanam	Malayalam	2023	
25	Athiloka Komalangi	Manamey	Telugu	2024	Telugu Debut
26	Oru Shalabhamai	Kurukku	Malayalam	2024	
27	Pavizham Pol	Good Friday	Malayalam	2024	
28	Eravithilai	Kadha Innuvare	Malayalam	2024	
29	Jogada Barsa	Kajja	Tulu	2026	Tulu Debut

=== Filmography ===
Year	Title	Assistant director	Actor	Singer	Notes
2018	Koode	Yes			Director's assistant
2020	Varane Avashyamund		Yes		Guest appearance in the song "Nee Vaa En Aarumukha"
2022	Hridayam	Yes		Yes	

== Awards and nominations ==
Year	Award	Film	Result
Mazhavil Mango Music Awards	Best Duet (with Aparna Balamurali)	"Mazha Paadum" (Sunday Holiday)	Won
Red FM Malayalam Music Awards	Best Duet (with Aparna Balamurali)	"Mazha Paadum" (Sunday Holiday)	Won
7th South Indian International Movie Awards	Best Male Playback Singer (Malayalam)	"Mazha Paadum" (Sunday Holiday)	Nominated
6th Satyajit Ray International Documentary & Short Film Festival Award 2022	Best Singer	"Thumbikku oru oonjal"	Won
World Television Day Raj Narayanji Media Award 2022	Best Singer	"Pranayavarnagal"(Zee Keralam)	Won
69th Filmfare Awards South	Filmfare Award for Best Male Playback Singer – Malayalam	"Oru Nokkil" (Madhura Manohara Moham)	Nominated
