= Manoj Kuroor =

Indian writer

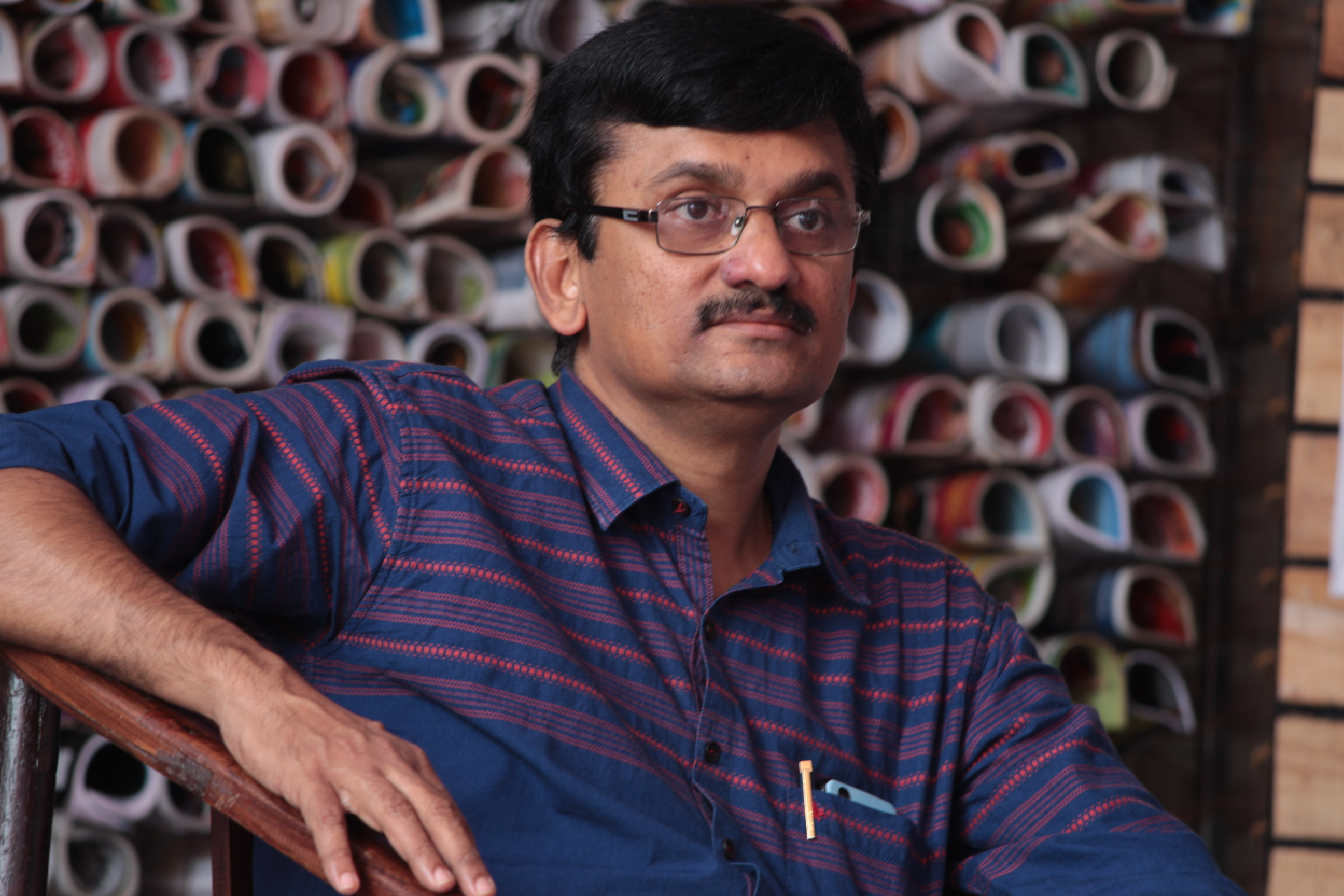
- Born: 31 May 1971 (age 55); Kottayam, Kerala, India
- Education: Master of Philosophy; Doctor of Philosophy
- Alma mater: Baselius College, Kottayam; St. Berchmans College, Changanassery; Mahatma Gandhi University, Kottayam
- Occupations: Poet; Lecturer
- Notable work: Nilam Poothu Malarnna Naal; Coma; Uthamapurushan Katha Parayumpol; Thrithala Kesavan
- Spouse: N. Sandhyadevi
- Children: 2
- Parents: Kuroor Cheriya Vasudevan Namboothiri; Sreedevi Andarjanam
- Relatives: Kuroor Valiya Vasudevan Namboothiri (Grandfather)
- Awards: Kerala Sahitya Akademi Kanakasree Award, 2007

Manoj Kuroor (born 31 May 1971) is an Indian poet, novelist and lyricist who writes in Malayalam.

== Personal life ==
Manoj Kuroor was born at Kottayam, to chenda exponent Kuroor Cheriya Vasudevan Namboothiri and Sreedevi Andarjanam. He is the grandson of Kathakali artist Kuroor Vasudevan Namboothiri. Manoj learnt Thayambaka and Kathakali melam from his father and then from Aayamkudi Kuttappa Marar. Manoj has been playing chenda for Kathakali since 1989.

Manoj studied at Baselius College, Kottayam, St. Berchmans College, Changanassery and then at School of Letters, Kottayam. From School of Letters, Manoj obtained M.Phil for his research on rhythm structures in Kunchan Nambiar's Harineeswayamvaram Thullal. He was awarded doctorate by the same institution for his research on folk rhythms in modern Malayalam poetry.

He joined N. S. S. College, Pandalam as Malayalam lecturer in 1997. He is currently Associate Professor in the Malayalam department at NSS Hindu College, Changanassery. He is married to N. Sandhyadevi and they have a daughter and a son.

== Career ==
Manoj is the author of three novels: Nilam Poothu Malarnna Naal (ISBN 978-81-264-6404-3), Murinavu (ISBN 978-93-5390-514-9), and Manalppava (ISBN 978-93-6254-127-7), which are based on various periods of Kerala's cultural history.

The first two novels were translated into Tamil by K. V. Jeyasri, and the translation of Nilam Poothu Malarnna Naal won the Sahitya Akademi Award (2020).

Nilam Poothu Malarnna Naal has also been translated into English by Dr. J. Devika and published by Bloomsbury Books.

Manoj composed two Kathakali librettos Panchali Dhananjayam and Bhagavad Geetha during his college days. He won the Kunchu Pillai Memorial Award for Young Poets in 1997 for his poem Thrithala Kesavan which was based on the Thayambaka expert Thrithaka Kesava Poduval. His first published poetry collection Uthamapurushan Katha Parayumpol (When the First-Person Narrates) contains 30 poems. Critic E. P. Rajagopalan and post-modern poet A. C. Sreehari in their study point out that Manoj follows a rare technique of storytelling in poetry. For this book, Manoj won the S. B. T. Poetry Award in 2005.

In October 2005, he published a fiction poem named Coma in Bhashaposhini, which was later published as an independent book in 2006. For this book, he won the Kanakasree Award of Kerala Sahitya Akademi in 2007.

Manoj has published more than 50 articles on various topics such as western classical music, classical art forms, popular music, folklore art forms, cinema, literature, and cyber culture. He also writes poems and literary criticism in contemporary publications. Some of his works have been included in the syllabuses of various universities in Kerala.

Manoj has written songs for several movies, including a three-scene aattakatha for the film Vanaprastham. He composed music for two of P. Balachandran's dramas Maya Seethangam: Oru Punyapuranaprasna Nadakam and Theatre Therapy.

== Awards and recognitions ==
- Padmarajan Award, 2021 (Murinavu)

== Published works ==
Manoj's published works are listed below:

- Murinavu, D. C. Books, 2020
- Nilam Poothu Malarnna Naal, D. C. Books, 2015, ISBN 9788126464043
- Uthamapurushan Katha Parayumpol (When the First-Person Narrates), Rainbow Books, Chengannur, 2004. ISBN 81-88146-76-5
- Nathonnatha Nadivazhi 44: Poems on Rivers, Rainbow Books, Chengannur, 2003. ISBN 81-88146-30-7
- Anchati Jnanappana Onappattu, D. C. Books, Kottayam, 1996 ISBN 81-7130-598-9
- Coma, D. C. Books, Kottayam, 2006 ISBN 81-264-1239-9
- Shanmugha Vijayam Attakatha, 1989
- Rahmania: Indian Sangeethathinte Aagola Sancharam, Rainbow Books, Chengannur
- Nirappakittulla Nrithasangeetham, D. C. Books, Kottayam, ISBN 978-81-264-3921-8
- Keralathile Thaalangalum Kalakalum, Sahitya Pravarthaka Sahakarana Sangham, 2014, ISBN 978-93-84571-17-7

His poems are included in the following anthologies:

- Yuvakavithakkoottam, D. C. Books, Kottayam, 1999. ISBN 81-7130-991-7
- Kavithayude Noottandu (The Century of Poems), Sahitya Pravarthaka Co-operative society, Kottayam, 2001.
- Kavithavarsham (The Rain of Poetry), Green Books, Thrissur, 2003. ISBN 81-88582-24-7
- Paristhithikkavithakal (Poems on Environment), S. P. C. S., Kottayam, 2006.
- Disakal (The Directions), National Book Trust, Delhi, 2007.

== As lyricist ==
The following table contains the list of songs Manoj has written for movies.

Track	Song title	Movie
1	Kaaminee Mama Manorathagaaminee	Vanaprastham, 1999
2	Arjuna Vallabhayallao Njan	Vanaprastham, 1999
3	Kandu Njan Thozhee	Vanaprastham, 1999
4	Kaliyay Nee	Swapaanam, 2014
5	Andarangameevidham	Swapaanam, 2014
6	Mazhaville	Swapaanam, 2014
7	Paalazhi Thedum	Swapaanam, 2014
8	Oru Vela Raavinnakam	Swapaanam, 2014
9	Maadhava Maasamo	Swapaanam, 2014
10	Irul Mazhayil	Angels, 2014
11	Ethippoyi	Loham
12	Ranam (Title Track)	Ranam (2018 film)
