= Vandhal Sridevi =

2018 Indian Tamil TV series

- Genre: Family; Drama
- Written by: Ravi Pirasanna
- Directed by: Arul Rajan
- Starring: M. Meenakshisundaram (Hero Mms) Ananya; Nandan Loganathan; Lasya Nagraj
- Country of origin: India
- Original language: Tamil
- No. of episodes: 313

Production
- Producer: S. Sivakumar
- Production location: Tamil Nadu
- Camera setup: Multi-camera
- Running time: 22 minutes

Original release
- Network: Colors Tamil
- Release: 11 April 2018 – 28 June 2019

Related
- Lakshmi Baramma; Thirumangalyam

Vandhal Sridevi (transl. Sridevi Came In) is an Indian Tamil language TV series which starred M. Meenakshisundaram, Ananya, Nandan Loganathan, Lasya Nagraj, Meera Krishna and Devipriya. It is the official remake of the Kannada language TV series Lakshmi Baramma of Colors Kannada. The show replaced Enga Veetu Mapillai and aired on Colors Tamil from 18 April 2018 to 28 June 2019.

== Plot ==
Vandhal Sridevi is the story of a small town girl Sridevi. She is an illegitimate daughter and her family treats her as a slave. She escapes her cruel family through an inconvenient marriage to a man named Sidharth, a 30 year old bachelor who is the owner of a successful multinational company, and her struggles thereafter.

== Cast ==
=== Main ===
- M. Meenakshisundaram (Hero Mms) as Murugan Sri Devi
- Ananya as Sridevi / Lakshmi − Sidharth's wife
- Nandan Loganathan as Sidharth − Sridevi's husband; Sruthi's fiancé
- Lasya Nagraj / Suju Vasan as Sruthi a.k.a. Ammu − Sidharth's girlfriend

=== Recurring ===
- Sirisha Sougandh / Meera Krishna as Janaki − Sidharth's widowed mother
- Devipriya as Saindhavi − Sidharth & Sruthi's aunty
- Sonia as Sambavi − Sruthi's mother; Saindhavi's elder sister
- Ashok Pandian as Prakash − Sruthi's father
- Azhagappan as Ramu − Housekeeper
- Reshma Reshu as Bairavi − Sidharth and Sruthi's aunty
- Reena as Akila − Sidharth & Sruthi's grandmother
- Vetrivelan as Akash
- Manu as Anandraj

== Adaptations ==
Language	Title	Original release	Network	Last aired	Notes
Kannada	Lakshmi Baramma ಲಕ್ಷ್ಮಿ ಬಾರಮ್ಮಾ	4 March 2013	Colors Kannada	25 January 2020	Original
Gujarati	Laxmi Sadaiv Mangalam લક્ષ્મી સદૈવ મંગલમ	29 January 2018	Colors Gujarati	17 April 2021	Remake
Tamil	Vandhal Sridevi வந்தாள் ஸ்ரீதேவி	11 April 2018	Colors Tamil	28 June 2019	Remake
Marathi	Lakshmi Sadaiv Mangalam लक्ष्मी सदैव मंगलम्	14 May 2018	Colors Marathi	25 May 2019	Remake
Hindi	Mishri मिश्री	3 July 2024	Colors TV	3 November 2024	Remake
