= S Saraswathi =

- Theatrical release poster
- Directed by: Varalaxmi Sarathkumar
- Screenplay by: Varalaxmi Sarathkumar
- Story by: Sai Madhav Burra
- Produced by: Pooja Sarathkumar; Varalaxmi Sarathkumar
- Starring: Varalaxmi Sarathkumar; Prakash Raj; Priyamani; Jiiva
- Cinematography: A. M. Edwin Sakay
- Edited by: Venkat Raajen
- Music by: Thaman S
- Production companies: Dosa Diaries LLP; ETV Win
- Release date: 6 March 2026
- Country: India
- Language: Telugu

S Saraswathi is a 2026 Indian Telugu-language drama thriller film co-written, co-produced and directed by Varalaxmi Sarathkumar in her directorial debut. The film stars Varalaxmi Sarathkumar in lead role alongside Prakash Raj and Priyamani.

== Plot ==
Lakshmi (Varalaxmi Sarathkumar) works as a government nurse and lives with her daughter Saraswathi. Lakshmi drops Saraswathi off at school for the Independence Day celebration, which is also Saraswathi's birthday. in the evening. The school says there is only one girl named Saraswathi, but it is not her daughter. Sub-Inspector Krishna Reddy (Murali Sharma) comes to investigate, but there is no evidence that her daughter studies at that school. The next day, Lakshmi goes to the police station and says that her daughter was abused by the principal and other staff, which resulted in her daughter's death, and she buried her in the cemetery. When the police reach the burial site, they do not find Saraswathi's body, and the police say they cannot proceed with the case because there is no evidence.

Lakshmi hires the lawyer Ramanujam (Prakash Raj), who fights for justice and truth. Ramanujam decides to take up the case and try to make a case even though there is no evidence, but Saraswathi says that these are not the people who abused her daughter. After a few months, Lakshmi kills a judge, a district collector, and a top police officer. She surrenders and informs the judge that those people have abused her daughter. Chief Justice Uma Maheswar (Rao Ramesh) orders Ramanujam to investigate the case thoroughly and provide the proper details. Ramanujam reaches out to Lakshmi's husband Aditya (Jiiva); the couple lives separately. Aditya says they do not have a daughter and that Lakshmi cannot have kids. He informs Ramanujam that the evidence picture is Lakshmi's childhood photo. Ramanujam reaches out to Anthony (Nassar) to understand what is happening to Lakshmi and perform hypnosis on her to get the truth out of her.

Lakshmi is actually Saraswathi; her parents are Lakshmi (Priyamani) and Prabhakar (Kishore); and an abuse incident happened to her. While in prison, she also kills the minister who attends the Independence Day celebration. Ramanujam pleads to the judge that she is suffering from a fantasy disorder and asks for a reduction in her prison sentence. She is admitted to a mental asylum, and it is later revealed that Aditya and Lakshmi planned the whole thing to take revenge.

== Cast ==
- Varalaxmi Sarathkumar as Lakshmi aka Saraswathi
- Prakash Raj as Ramanujam
- Priyamani as Lakshmi
- Jiiva as Aditya (extended cameo appearance)
- Kishore as Prabhakar, Lakshmi's father
- Rao Ramesh as Chief Justice Uma Maheswar
- Murali Sharma as Sub-Inspector Krishna Reddy
- Radikaa Sarathkumar as Dr. Tulasi
- Nassar as Anthony
- Tulasi
- Saptagiri as Swami, Junior Lawyer
- Srikanth Iyengar as Lawyer
- Hareesh Peradi as District Collector Satyasundar
- Mime Gopi
- Raghu Babu as Principal Rambabu
- Getup Srinu as Cemetery Worker
- Venkat
- Baby Niveksha as S. Saraswathi
- Pramila Rani

== Production ==
Naveen Chandra was initially reported to be a part of the film. The film was renamed from Saraswathi to S Saraswathi due to objections from the censor board.

== Music ==
The music was composed by Thaman S.

Track listing
No.	Title	Lyrics	Singer(s)	Length
1.	"Laali Laali"	D. Dheeraj	Sunitha Upadrasta	03:55
2.	"Na Chinni Chinni Lokam"	Krshna Kanth	Usha Munukutla	05:18
3.	"Kannamma (Female Version)"	Kalyan Chakravarthy	Gopika Poornima	04:01
4.	"Kannamma (Male Version)"	Kalyan Chakravarthy	Sri Krishna	04:01
Total length:				17:15

== Reception ==
Srivathsan Nadadhur of The Hindu wrote, "S Saraswathi’s call for a safer world for women is hard to dismiss, but the storytelling is unoriginal, takes far too many cinematic liberties and offers little emotional connection". Sanjana Pulugurtha of The Times of India rated the film two-and-a-half out of five stars and wrote, "While it [the film] shows sincerity and heart in its exploration, a sharper screenplay and more consistent pacing might have helped it reach the emotional and narrative heights it aims for". Yashaswini Sri of The Indian Express rated the film three out of five stars and wrote, "Varalaxmi Sarathkumar’s S Saraswathi has all the ingredients of a film that could have shaken you. The filmmaking only partly delivers on that potential". Suresh Kairayani of The New Indian Express rated the film two-and-a-half out of five stars and wrote, "Overall, S Saraswathi deals with a serious and relevant subject, but th[e] predictability is a downer. With stronger writing and tighter narration, the film could have turned out even better". Bhawana Tanmayi of Moneycontrol gave the film the same rating and wrote, "Perhaps the film could have had a more profound impact if it had been written with greater precision and had a more captivating second half.Nevertheless, it is an average viewing experience in its current state".
