= Maa (2018 film) =

2018 film by Sarjun KM

- Directed by: Sarjun KM
- Written by: Sarjun KM; Priyanka Ravindran
- Produced by: Gautham Vasudev Menon; Venkat Somasundaram; Reshma Ghatala
- Starring: Anikha Surendran; Kani Kusruti
- Cinematography: Sudharshan Srinivasan
- Edited by: Sarjun KM
- Music by: Sundaramurthy KS
- Production company: Ondraga Entertainment
- Release date: 25 January 2018
- Running time: 28 minutes
- Country: India
- Language: Tamil

Maa (transl. Mother) is a 2018 Indian Tamil-language short film directed and edited by Sarjun KM and produced by Gautham Vasudev Menon, Venkat Somasundaram and Reshma Ghatala under his banner Ondraga Entertainment. The script was written by Sarjun and Priyanka Ravindran, and it features Anikha Surendran and Kani Kusruti in the lead roles. The music is composed by Sundaramurthy KS and cinematography was handled by Sudharshan Srinivasan. It was released on 25 January 2018. The makers released a Telugu dubbed version of the short film on 23 February 2018.

== Plot ==
Maa tells the tale of Ammu (Anikha Surendran), a 15-year-old school-going girl from a typically conservative middle-class family — who discovers she is pregnant in the middle of a hockey match. After some warranted fear-induced deliberation, she confides in her mother, Sathya (Kani Kusruti). The mother's immediate reaction is, as expected, one of shock, disgust and anger. After the daughter persistently apologises for her 'mistake', the mother eventually accepts her. But, of course, they can't share this highly sensitive information with the uptight father, who is (rather forcefully) antagonised as a traditionalist with pre-historic, pre-conceived notions on what constitutes womanly behaviour. So, the mother decides that abortion is the only way her daughter can move on and get her life back on track. And Ammu willfully concurs, gets one and moves on.

== Cast ==
- Anikha Surendran as Ammu
- Kani Kusruti as Sathya

== Soundtrack ==
A single from the film titled "Ennuyire", composed by Sundaramurthy KS, was released on 31 January 2018. It featured vocals by the composer Sundaramurthy and Padmapriya Raghavan with lyrics written by Madhan Karky.

Track listing
No.	Title	Lyrics	Singer(s)	Length
1.	"Ennuyire"	Madhan Karky	Sundaramurthy KS, Padmapriya Raghavan	2:16

== Reception ==
The short film opened to positive response from critics. Writing for India Today, Kirubakar Purushothaman added "More than for his intention to bring the touchy issue to the fore, Sarjun deserves a pat on the back for not making the film preachy even when he had enough room to do so." Ashameera Aiyyapan of The Indian Express stated the film as a "must watch, despite the pandora box of debates it might open". Speaking to Firstpost, Prahlad Srihari opined that "Maa is a modest triumph in storytelling that will surely provoke discussion of some emotional and moral issues related to teen pregnancy." Manasa Rao of The News Minute reviewed that "While the film is definitely a must watch, especially for parents, one wishes that it had ventured into actually looking at adolescent sexuality for what it is and not stuck to being a cautionary tale alone." Nandini Ramanath of Scroll.in wrote "The film mostly steers clear from exploring female sexuality, but sheds light on the contradictions of a mother-daughter relationship. And it also touches upon the stark differences in the repercussions for boys and girls exploring their sexuality."
