= Venkatesh Harinathan =

Indian actor

- Born: Venkatesh Mohana Harinathan; Chennai, India
- Occupation: Actor
- Years active: 2013–present

Venkatesh Harinathan is an Indian actor, who appears in Tamil cinema.

== Career ==
Venkatesh made his acting careers in Stage Plays. He belongs to Chennai-based theater group Stray Factory and also appeared in various Television Commercials. Venkatesh made his film debut in Tamil film Irandaam Ulagam. He acted in key roles in Sutta Kadhai and Moone Moonu Varthai. He also translated and starred in Maya from Madurai, written by Naren Weiss and directed by Pooja Devariya.

== Filmography ==
- All films are in Tamil, unless otherwise noted.

| Year | Film | Role | Notes |
|---|---|---|---|
| 2013 | Sutta Kadhai | Sangilimaaran | |
| 2013 | Irandaam Ulagam | Venky | |
| 2015 | Moone Moonu Varthai | Karna | |
| 2015 | Moodu Mukkallo Cheppalante | Karna | Telugu film |
| 2016 | Meendum Oru Kadhal Kadhai | Altaf | |
| 2018 | Thaanaa Serndha Koottam | Kapil Gavaskar | |
| 2018 | Odu Raja Odu | Peter | |

Web series

- Ctrl Alt Del (2016)
