= Nandan Loganathan =

Indian actor

- Born: 14 September 1987 (age 38); Chennai, Tamilnadu
- Occupation: Actor
- Years active: 2017–present
- Spouse: Anita Paneerselvam (m. 2018)
- Children: Athira

Nandan Loganathan is an Indian actor who predominantly works in Tamil serials and films. He first shot to fame in a Tamil short film "Lakshmi" for his role ‘Kathir’ . He then acted in Colors Tamil Vandhal Sridevi (2018–2019) and in a Tamil feature film Chithiram Pesuthadi 2 (2019).He played the male lead in ‘Chitthi 2’ in Sun tv. He played the male lead in ‘Ilakkiya’ in Sun Tv. He was ranked 6th in the list of "15 Most Desirable Actors in Tamil Television" released by the online daily The Times of India in 2021. He is currently doing a Tamil webseries for Amazon prime which is slated to release soon.

== Early life ==
Nandan Loganathan was born on 14 September 1987, in Chennai, Tamil Nadu to Loganathan and Kanaka. He received his bachelor's degree from Loyola College, Chennai.

== Career ==
He co-starred with actress Lakshmi Priya in the 2017 short film Lakshmi directed by Sarjun. The short film was critically acclaimed and a huge success. It was followed by a series on Colors Tamil Vandal Sridevi starring as ‘Siddharth’. He played the male lead in hit serial ‘Chithi 2’ in Sun to. He played the lead role in Ilakkiya in Sun Tv.

He played the role of "Kadir" in the 2019 film Chithiram Pesuthadi 2.

== Filmography ==
=== Serials and TV shows ===
Year	Title	Role	Channel	Language
2018–2019	Vandhal Sridevi	Siddharth	Colors Tamil	Tamil
2020	Chithi 2 Special Show	Himself	Sun TV	Tamil
2020–2022	Chithi 2	Kavin and Naveen	Sun TV	Tamil
2020	Vanakkam Tamizha	Guest	Sun TV	Tamil
2020	Vanakkam Tamizha	Guest	Sun TV	Tamil
2020	Jackpot Journey	Himself	Sun Music	Tamil
2020	Poove Unakkaga	Kavin (Special Appearance)	Sun TV	Tamil
2021	Abhiyum Naanum	Kavin (Special Appearance)	Sun TV	Tamil
2021	Thirumagal	Kavin (Special Appearance)	Sun TV	Tamil
2021	Vada da	Himself	Sun Music	Tamil
2021	Vanathai Pola	Kavin (Special Appearance)	Sun TV	Tamil
2021	Poova Thalaiya	Contestant	Sun TV	Tamil
2021	Kannana Kanne	Kavin (Special Appearance)	Sun TV	Tamil
2021–2023	Kavyanjali	Sushant	Gemini TV	Telugu
2021	Poova Thalaiya	Contestant	Sun TV	Tamil
2021	Vanakkam Tamizha	Guest	Sun TV	Tamil
2021	Thalai Deepavali	Kavin	Sun TV	Tamil
2022	Bomma Borusaa	Contestant	Gemini TV	Telugu
2022	Maathi Yosi	Contestant	Sun TV	Tamil
2022	Vanathai Pola	Kavin (Special Appearance)	Sun TV	Tamil
2022–2026	Ilakkiya	Gautham	Sun TV	Tamil
2022	Vanakkam Tamizha	Guest	Sun TV	Tamil
2022	Ullathai Allitha	Gautham	Sun TV	Tamil
2023	Thalai Pongal	Gautham	Sun TV	Tamil
2023	Ranjithame	Contestant	Sun TV	Tamil
2023	Super Samayal	Contestant	Sun TV	Tamil
2023	Ranjithame	Contestant	Sun TV	Tamil
2024	Mama Manasilaayo	Gautham	Sun TV	Tamil
2024	Naanga Ready Neenga Readya	Contenstant	Sun TV	Tamil

=== Movies ===
Year	Title	Role	Notes
2017	Lakshmi	Kathir	Short Film of the Year
2019	Chithiram Pesuthadi 2	Kathir	
