= Addham =

2020 Indian web series

- Genre: Drama
- Directed by: Barath Neelakantan; Sarjun KM; Siva Ananth
- Starring: Prasanna; Varalaxmi Sarathkumar; Abhirami Venkatachalam; Kishore; Jayaprakash; Rohini
- Country of origin: India
- Original language: Telugu
- No. of seasons: 1
- No. of episodes: 3

Production
- Producers: Sujatha Narayanan; E S Devasena
- Editor: A. Sreekar Prasad

Original release
- Network: Aha
- Release: October 16, 2020

Addham is a 2020 Indian Telugu-language anthology streaming television series directed by Barath Neelakantan, Sarjun KM, and Siva Ananth. The series comprises three episodes with cast and crew hailing from Chennai.

== Segments ==
- Crossroads by Barath Neelakantan
- The Road That Never Ends by Sarjun KM
- The Unwhisperable Secret by Siva Ananth

== Cast ==
Crossroads	The Road That Never Ends	The Unwhisperable Secret
Prasanna as Krish; Abhirami Venkatachalam as Rekha; Pavithra Marimuthu as Swetha	Jayaprakash as Sathyam; Praveen as Kumar; Rohini as Shanti	Kishore as Ram; Varalaxmi Sarathkumar as Shruti; Arjun Chidambaram

== Reception ==
The Hindu reviewed "The ideas explored in Addham are universal, beyond region and language barriers. It’s not a perfect, bravura series but definitely worth delving into". The New Indian Express gave the series a rating of two-and-a-half out of five stars and wrote, "But, overall, Addham falls short of capitalising on interesting premises and characters".
