= Sutta Kadhai =

2013 Indian film by Subu

- Theatrical release poster
- Directed by: Subu
- Written by: Subu
- Produced by: Ravindar Chandrasekaran
- Starring: Balaji Venugopal; Venkatesh Harinathan
- Cinematography: Nizar Shafi
- Edited by: Sathish Suriya
- Music by: Madley Blues
- Production company: Libra Productions
- Distributed by: Vendhar Movies
- Release date: 25 October 2013
- Country: India
- Language: Tamil

Sutta Kadhai (transl. Stolen Story) is a 2013 Indian Tamil-language black comedy thriller film written and directed by Subu in his directorial debut. The film features an ensemble cast including Balaji Venugopal, Venkatesh Harinathan, Lakshmi Priyaa Chandramouli, Nassar, M. S. Bhaskar, Lakshmi Ramakrishnan, and Jayaprakash. The plot revolves around two police constables who try to solve a murder case in a village.

Ravindar Chandrasekaran of Libra Productions produced the film, while cinematography was handled by Nizar. Sathish took charge of choreography, while Suriya was the editor. The music was composed by Harish Harz and Prashanth, better known by their stage name Madley Blues. Principal photography took place in and around Kodaikanal. The film was released on 25 October 2013.

== Cast ==
- Balaji Venugopal as Constable Ramakrishnan (Ramki)
- Venkatesh Harinathan as Constable Sangilimaaran
- Lakshmi Priyaa Chandramouli as Silandhi
- Rinson Simon as Therai
- Nassar as Inspector Thirumeni
- Jayaprakash as Oliver Twist
- M. S. Bhaskar as Ottagam
- Lakshmi Ramakrishnan as Sakkarai Devi
- R. S. Shivaji
- T. P. Gajendran as Sudalai
- Jayamani as Village Head
- K. Gopal as Writer Gopal
- Dongli Jumbo as Singamuthu
- Subbu as Walter Vetrivel
- Pooja Banu as Cleopatra
- Latha Maniarasu as Poonguzhali
- Usha as Susheela
- Azhagu as Narimuthu
- Chelladurai as Justice Jambulingam
- Rajiv Rajaraman as Inspector Rajaram
- S. R. Ananth as Constable Charles
- Sivakumar as Police Selection Officer
- Prabhu Mani as Comic Police
- Shyam Srivatsan as Comic Thief
- Vicky as Cycle Thief
- Vishwa Thooyakaran as Cycle Thief
- Arun Prasad as Bagavathi, tea master
- Mani as Waiter
- N. Nr. Narayanan as House Owner
- Saranya as Nurse
- Muthu Pandian as Tribal Man
- Akbar Basha as Photographer
- Muthukumar as Pickpocket
- Dharani as Tea Boy

== Production ==
Subu, who had earlier served as a lyricist for the movie Aarohanam, completed the first schedule in Kodaikanal in March 2013. Two of the actors, Venkatesh and Lakshmi Priyaa, have worked with Chennai-based theatre groups, Stray Factory and Evam respectively. Lakshmi Priyaa, who plays the role of a tribal girl in Sutta Kadhai, liked the script because the storyline of the dark comedy was different."

According to Subu, Sutta Kadhai will be a different creation because of the milieu of the story. "Even as the rip-roaring instances happen, the underlying factors are spine-chilling. It is all about a murder and the ensuing enquiry. The story takes place at night, and we shot the film extensively in Kodaikanal. One night while shooting, we were confronted by a herd of wild buffaloes, which added to the thrill," says Subu.

== Soundtrack ==
The music was composed by Madley Blues, a band consisting of Harish Venkat and Prashanth Techno. The audio launch was held on 1 June at the Victoria Hall in Geneva, Switzerland along with the audios of Nalanum Nandhiniyum and Thillu Mullu.

- "Anbe Aaruyire" — Harish Venkat
- "Ding Dong Kuthu Song" — Mano, Solar Sai
- "Kaattukulla Kannamoochi" — Vijay Prakash, Harish Venkat, Harshitha
- "Twist on top" — Harish Venkat, Venky, Subu
- "Unnai Naanum" — Harish Venkat
- "Yele Yele" — M. S. Viswanathan, Harish Venkat

== Release ==
The satellite rights of the film were sold to Puthuyugam, and the film had its television premiere on 3 November 2013 one week after its theatrical release.

== Critical reception ==
Baradwaj Rangan from The Hindu wrote "Subu has a superb eye for the absurd. The film is filled with borderline-surreal non sequiturs, some of which are downright Monty Pythonesque. The problem is that the director feels compelled to connect these bits through a “story,” and the plot, even at an hour and 45 minutes, is a major drag". Sify said the film "falls flat, mainly due to its presentation".
