= Sivaranjiniyum Innum Sila Pengalum =

2018 Indian film by Vasanth

- Poster
- Directed by: Vasanth
- Screenplay by: Vasanth
- Story by: Ashokamitran (Vimosanam); Adhavan (Ottam); B. Jeyamohan (Devakich Chiththiyin Diary)
- Produced by: Vasanth
- Starring: Lakshmi Priyaa Chandramouli; Parvathy Thiruvothu; Kalieswari Sreenivasan
- Cinematography: N. K. Ekambaram
- Edited by: A. Sreekar Prasad
- Music by: Ilaiyaraaja
- Production company: Hamsa Productions
- Distributed by: SonyLIV
- Release dates: October 2018 (Mumbai Film Festival); 26 November 2021 (SonyLIV)
- Running time: 123 minutes
- Country: India
- Language: Tamil

Sivaranjiniyum Innum Sila Pengalum (transl. Sivaranjani and a few other women) is an Indian Tamil-language anthology film directed by Vasanth and starring Lakshmi Priyaa Chandramouli, Parvathy Thiruvothu, and Kalieswari Sreenivasan. The film notably has no score, instead featuring sounds designed by Anand Krishnamoorthi. The film began production in early 2015, premiered at the Mumbai Film Festival in October 2018 and released on 26 November 2021 via SonyLIV. It won three National Film Awards: Best Tamil Feature Film, Best Supporting Actress (Lakshmi Priyaa Chandramouli) and Best Editing (Sreekar Prasad).

== Plot ==
The film contains three female-centric short stories written by the writers Ashoka Mithran (Vimosanam), Adhavan (Ottam) and Jeyamohan (Devakich Chiththiyin Diary).

== Cast ==
- Lakshmi Priyaa Chandramouli as Sivaranjini
- Parvathy Thiruvothu as Devaki
- Kalieswari Srinivasan as Saraswati
- Karunakaran as Chandran
- Sunder Ramu as Mani
- Karthick Krishna as Hari
- G. Marimuthu
- Senthi Kumari
- Rama
- Lizzie Antony
- Cheenu Mohan

== Production ==
In January 2015, with Vasanth began work on a new film starring Parvathy Thiruvothu, with Karunakaran also being a part of the cast. Vasanth noted that the film would be women-centric and would be made as a tribute to his late mentor, K. Balachander, who often depicted strong woman characters in his films. The film was revealed to have three female-centric short stories written by writers B. Jeyamohan, Adhavan and Ashokamitran.

Vasanth shot scenes featuring Pooja Kumar in September 2015 but later changed the script and dropped the actress from the project. The lead actress of the film Dheepan (2015), Kalieaswari Srinivasan, was also recruited to portray a role in the film during late 2015. In August 2016, Vasanth revealed that the film was 70% complete. In November 2017, Parvathy revealed that she had completed work on the film and that she would portray a working woman in the early 1990s. She added that the film was shot on a small budget and the creative work was done in a single room rather than having a big film set.

== Release ==
Sivaranjiniyum Innum Sila Pengalum premiered at the Mumbai Film Festival in October 2018. It continued to be screened at film festivals in the coming years such as Japan's Fukuoka International Film Festival, and released on 26 November 2021 via SonyLIV.

== Reception ==
Srinivasa Ramanujan of The Hindu praised Vasanth for making a "powerful anthology delves deep into the minds of women across three time periods". M. Suganth of The Times of India rated the film 4/5, stating that Vasanth was "operating at the peak of his powers in this wholesome anthology, combining visuals and sound to devastating effect".
