= Varalaxmi Sarathkumar =

Indian actress (born 1985)

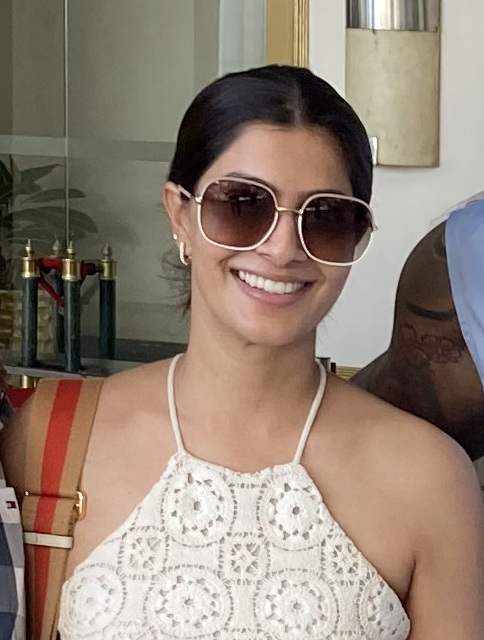
- Varalaxmi in 2025
- Born: 5 March 1985 (age 41); Bangalore, Karnataka, India
- Other name: Varu Sarathkumar
- Education: Hindustan Arts & Science College (BSc); University of Edinburgh (Master in Management)
- Occupation: Actress
- Years active: 2012–present
- Spouse: Nicholai Sachdev (m. 2024)
- Parent(s): R. Sarathkumar (father); Raadhika (step-mother)

Varalaxmi Sarathkumar (born 5 March 1985) is an Indian actress who appears in Tamil, Telugu, Kannada and Malayalam films. She made her debut with the Tamil film Podaa Podi (2012).

== Early life and family ==
Varalaxmi was born to actor Sarathkumar and Chaya on 5 March 1985 in Bangalore (Bengaluru), Karnataka, India.

Varalaxmi did her schooling from St. Michael's Academy, Chennai. She is a graduate in Microbiology from Hindustan Arts and Science college, Chennai with a Masters in Business Management from the University of Edinburgh. She honed her acting skills at Anupam Kher's Acting School in Mumbai, before becoming a professional actress. Her stepmother is actress Raadhika.

== Personal life ==
On 2 March 2024, Varalaxmi got engaged to Nicholai Sachdev, who is a gallerist based in Mumbai. They married on 3 July 2024. In a 2026 interview, Varalaxmi said she does not want to have children and that Sachdev is supportive of the decision, adding that she views Sachdev's daughter from his previous marriage like her own daughter.

== Career ==
Varalaxmi auditioned for Shankar's Boys (2003) and was selected to play the lead role, before her father requested her to turn down the opportunity. Similarly, she also missed out on opportunities to act in Balaji Sakthivel's Kaadhal (2004) and Venkat Prabhu's Saroja (2008).

Varalaxmi signed on to star in Vignesh Shivan's romantic drama film Podaa Podi (2012) during June 2008, citing that the opportunity to portray a London-based dancer had excited her. The film went through a protracted development, taking four years to make, before being released in October 2012. Co-starring Silambarasan, Varalaxmi won critical acclaim for her performance. Rediff.com noted she was the "scene stealer" and added "she comes across as a genuine, warm person, able and willing to accept those around her for themselves, and rattles off her dialogues with such spontaneity and charm that she wins you over right away". Likewise, a critic from Sify.com wrote she "is the big surprise here as she makes a promising debut and brings alive her character with not just those smart lines, but with the kind of confidence and candour". The film performed moderately at the box office but performed well in the multiplexes.

In 2014, she embarked on her second venture, the Kannada film Maanikya (2014), starring alongside actor Sudeep. This film proved to be a major success and emerged as one of the highest-grossing Kannada films of that year.

In 2016, she announced on Twitter that she has been cast alongside Mammootty in the Malayalam film Kasaba. In her tweet, the actress said that the big opportunity to work alongside Mammootty came to her apparently due to her performance in the Tamil film Tharai Thappattai. Varalaxmi was also committed to starring in Aakasha Mittaayee, the Malayalam remake of the Tamil film Appa but left, citing the behaviour of its producers whom she called "mannerless". In 2017, Varalaxmi appeared in Vikram Vedha, Nibunan, Vismaya, Sathya, Kaattu and Masterpiece. Varalaxmi turned as Host for a TV show titled Unnai Arindhaal (2018) on Jaya TV. She played the antagonist's role in Sandakozhi 2 (2018) and Sarkar (2018). She worked on her first Telugu film, Tenali Ramakrishna BA. BL (2019).

Varalaxmi played the lead role in Velvet Nagaram (2020). She has played a role in Danny (2020) in which she tried out the role of a cop. She has also starred in leading roles such as Chasing (2021) and Singa Paarvai (2021). She appeared in The Telegu film Yashoda (2022) starred Samantha Ruth Prabhu playing the title role, while Varalaxmi Sarath Kumar played the other important role. She playing a crazy character in Nandamuri Balakrishna’s Veera Simha Reddy (2023) as well as lead role in Sabari (2024).

Varalaxmi worked on Sundar C's masala film Madha Gaja Raja, alongside Vishal, which was released 13 years later in January 2025 owing to financial difficulties.

== Filmography ==
Key
†	Denotes films that have not yet been released

=== Films ===
List of Varalaxmi Sarathkumar film credits
Year	Title	Role(s)	Language	Notes	Ref.
2012	Podaa Podi	Nisha Arjun	Tamil	credited as Varu Sarathkumar	
2014	Maanikya	Sindhu	Kannada		
2015	Ranna	Herself	Kannada	Special appearance in the song "What To Do"	
2016	Kasaba	Kamala	Malayalam		
2016	Tharai Thappattai	Sooravali	Tamil		
2017	Vikram Vedha	Chandra	Tamil		
2017	Nibunan	Inspector Vandhana CB-CID	Tamil		
2017	Vismaya	Inspector Vandhana CB-CID	Kannada		
2017	Sathya	ACP Anuya Bharathwaj	Tamil		
2017	Kaattu	Muthu Lakshmi	Malayalam		
2017	Masterpiece	ACP Bhavani Durga IPS	Malayalam		
2018	Mr. Chandramouli	Bairavi	Tamil		
2018	Echcharikkai	Swetha	Tamil		
2018	Sandakozhi 2	Pechankarasi (Pechi)	Tamil		
2018	Sarkar	Komala Valli (Pappa)	Tamil		
2018	Maari 2	Vijaya Chamundeswari IAS	Tamil		
2019	Neeya 2	Devi	Tamil		
2019	Tenali Ramakrishna BA. BL	Varalakshmi Devi	Telugu		
2020	Velvet Nagaram	Usha	Tamil		
2020	Danny	Inspector Kunthavai	Tamil		
2020	Kanni Raasi	Anjali	Tamil		
2021	Krack	Jayamma	Telugu		
2021	Naandhi	Adv. Aadhya Mullapudi	Telugu		
2021	Ranam	Police officer	Kannada		
2021	Chasing	Athira	Tamil		
2021	Singa Paarvai	Divya	Tamil		
2022	Pakka Commercial	Lawyer	Telugu	Cameo appearance	
2022	Iravin Nizhal	Prema Kumari	Tamil		
2022	Poikkal Kuthirai	Rudhra	Tamil		
2022	Kaatteri	Mathamma	Tamil		
2022	Yashoda	Madhubala	Telugu		
2023	V3	Sivagami	Tamil		
2023	Veera Simha Reddy	Bhanumathi Reddy	Telugu		
2023	Michael	Kannamma	Telugu	Partially reshot in Tamil	
2023	Kannitheevu	Madhi	Tamil		
2023	Kondraal Paavam	Mallika	Tamil		
2023	Agent	Shalini	Telugu		
2023	Maruthi Nagar Police Station	Archana	Tamil		
2023	Kota Bommali PS	SP Razia Ali IPS	Telugu		
2024	Hanu-Man	Anjamma	Telugu		
2024	Sabari	Sanjana	Telugu		
2024	Raayan	Sethu's wife	Tamil	Cameo appearance	
2024	Mr. Celebrity		Telugu		
2024	Max	CID Inspector Roopa	Kannada		
2025	Madha Gaja Raja	Maya	Tamil	credited as Varu Sarathkumar; Delayed release; Shot in 2012	
2025	Shivangi Lioness	Sarika Singh	Telugu		
2025	The Verdict	Maya	Tamil		
2025	Phoenix	Maya	Tamil		
2026	Dheeram	Vimala Niranjan	Malayalam		
2026	S Saraswathi	Lakshmi	Telugu	Also director and co-producer	
2026	Police Complaint		Telugu		
2026	Rizana – A Caged Bird	Dr. Rani Chelvam	English, Tamil, Arabic	Sri Lankan film; filming	

=== Television ===
List of Varalaxmi Sarathkumar television credits
Year	Title	Role	Network	Language	Note
2018	Enga Veetu Mapillai	Herself	Colors Tamil	Tamil	
2018	Unnai Arindhaal	Host	Jaya TV	Tamil	
2019	High Priestess	Vaishnavi	ZEE5	Telugu	Guest appearance in Episode 6
2020	Addham	Shruti	Aha	Telugu	Segment: The Unwhisperable Secret
2020	Ummadi Kutumbam Tho Kammati Bhojanam	Herself	Zee Telugu	Telugu	
2023	Mansion 24	Amrutha	Disney+ Hotstar	Telugu	
2025	Dance Jodi Dance	Host	ZEE5	Tamil	
2026	Sattamum Neethiyum (Season 2)	Chandra	ZEE5	Tamil	

== Awards ==
List of Varalaxmi Sarathkumar awards
Year	Award	Work	Result	Ref.
2012	Vijay Award for Best Debut Actress	Podaa Podi	Won	
2012	Edison Award for Best Debut Actress	Podaa Podi	Won	
2016	South Indian International Movie Award for Best Actress (Critics)	Tharai Thappattai	Won	
2016	Behindwoods Gold Medals	Tharai Thappattai	Won	
2017	Edison Award for Best Character Role – Female	Vikram Vedha	Won	
2018	Behindwoods Gold Medals	Sarkar & Sandakozhi 2	Won	
2018	Ananda Vikatan Cinema Awards for Best Villain – Female	Sarkar & Sandakozhi 2	Won	
2019	8th South Indian International Movie Awards	Sarkar & Sandakozhi 2	Won	
2024	IIFA Utsavam for Supporting Actress – Telugu	Veera Simha Reddy	Won	
