= Echcharikkai =

Echcharikkai — Idhu Manidhargal Nadamaadum Idam
- Theatrical release poster
- Directed by: Sarjun KM
- Written by: Sarjun KM; Priyanka Ravindran
- Produced by: Sundar Annamalai
- Starring: Sathyaraj; Varalaxmi Sarathkumar; Kishore; Vivek Rajgopal; Yogi Babu
- Cinematography: Sudarshan Srinivasan
- Edited by: Karthik Jogesh
- Music by: Sundaramurthy KS
- Production company: Timeline Cinemas
- Release date: 24 August 2018
- Country: India
- Language: Tamil

Echcharikkai – Idhu Manidhargal Nadamaadum Idam (transl. Warning — Humans Territory) is a 2018 Indian Tamil-language crime thriller film written and directed by debutant director Sarjun KM. The film stars Sathyaraj, Varalaxmi Sarathkumar, Kishore, Vivek Rajgopal and Yogi Babu. Principal photography of the film commenced at Pondicherry in December 2016 and shooting wrapped up in April 2017. This story is inspired by The Disappearance of Alice Creed. The film was released on 24 August 2018 on the eve of Varalakshmi Vratam and received poor reviews from the audience.

== Plot ==
Echarikkai starts with the backstory of David (Kishore), a 19-year-old young man and his 5-year-old nephew Thomas (Vivek Rajgopal). Thomas' father, who is also the brother-in-law of David, is a man of domestic violence who often beats his wife. One day, when Thomas' father asked for money from his mother, and she refused, his father killed his mother, leaving David and Thomas completely shocked. Angry David kills his brother-in-law at the scene, and asks Thomas to take the responsibility for him. Thomas agrees, but later when the police arrive and slap Thomas, he becomes scared and tells the police the truth. David is, therefore, arrested.

After 15 years of humiliation in prison, David is finally released. During the past 15 years, Thomas, who lost both his parents and uncle, was living an extremely poor and indecent life. David reunites with Thomas, and does not hate Thomas for testifying against him 15 years ago, as he understands Thomas was so young at that time and could not stand fear or pressure. The two come up with a plan to kidnap a rich people to demand ransom. They choose Swetha (Varalaxmi), the only daughter of wealthy builder Perumal (Jayakumar).

They kidnap Swetha and keep her as hostage in a remote place, and inform her father of the kidnapping. They also warn her father against involving police in the case, or they will kill his daughter. Perumal is terrified and too scared to report the case to police, instead, he seeks the help of retired police officer Nataraj (Sathyaraj), who cannot come out of his house as he needs to take care of his daughter Pia (L. Alice), who has a rare medical condition and requires constant care.

In order not to be noticed by kidnappers, Nataraj decides to solve the case unofficially and secretly. He calls his former colleagues to his houses, instead of police station, to work on the case. Meanwhile, in Swetha's current place, while David leaves the house to contact Perumal, Swetha manages to fight with Thomas and takes his gun. Thomas removes his mask at the scene, revealing that not only the two knew each other already, but are actually lovers. Swetha becomes angry at Thomas for kidnapping her, while Thomas explains this is his plan to elope with her, as her father would never agree their marriage. They also plan to take away the ransom, without sharing it with David.

David demands Rs. 80 million from Perumal, in return of his daughter alive. Perumal agrees but only tells Nataraj that the ransom is Rs. 10 million, as most of his assets are illegal. Nataraj's men manage to find out identities of Thomas and David. David and Thomas also learn that police are involved. They cut a pinch of hair of Swetha, and send it to Perumal, threatening if police do not step out of the case immediately, it will be Swetha's head the next time. Perumal therefore requires Nataraj stop investigating; Nataraj agrees.

David designates a place to Perumal to put the money, while later Thomas contacts Perumal again, without David's knowledge, and tells him to put money in another place. David also manages to learn that Thomas and Swetha are lovers and planning something behind him. David talks to Swetha privately, successfully discrediting Thomas. Nataraj's doctor tells him that Pia can be cured in Singapore, but the operation would cost him Rs. 10 million. As Nataraj already knew Perumal is lying to him about the ransom amount and the place he is going to put the money, he comes up with the plan to steal the ransom money to save his daughter.

Perumal puts money at the Thomas designated place; David unknowingly releases unconscious Swetha, assuming Perumal has put money as he instructed. Thomas takes all the Rs. 80 million and escapes, but is stopped by Nataraj. Nataraj takes down Thomas, and takes around half of the ransom money from him and leaves. David arrives at the scene, and fights with Thomas. But they later reunite again after Thomas realizes that David kept supporting him even in jail. Swetha arrives at the scene and assumes being cheated by Thomas, shoots and kills him.

Nataraj is on the way to airport to take his daughter to Singapore for treatment, when his daughter experiences shivers and Nataraj burns the money to create fire and save his daughter.

== Cast ==
- Sathyaraj as Nataraj IPS
- Varalaxmi as Swetha
- Kishore as David
- Vivek Rajgopal as Thomas
- Yogi Babu as Frank De Souza
- Kausalya as Jaanu
- Vinodhini Vaidyanathan as Doctor
- Jayakumar as Perumal, Swetha's father
- L. Alice as Pia Nataraj
- Soundar as Ravi
- Suseenthiran G. as Young David
- Spyder Sanjay as Young Thomas

== Development ==
After completing his short film Lakshmi, director Sarjun KM approached Producer Sundar Annamalai of Timeline Cinemas with his feature film script. The film fell in place quickly as Varalaxmi and Kishore were frozen for major roles. After a series of auditions, debutant Vivek Rajagopal was selected as the male lead. Prakash Raj was initially supposed to essay the role of Nataraj IPS, but later, the role went to Sathyaraj due to dates issues. Music director K. S. Sundaramurthy, who had done Graghanam and 8 Thottakkal, was signed as the composer for the film. Debut cinematographer Sudarshan Srinivasan and Malayalam editor Karthik Jogesh were signed up for Cinematography and Editing respectively.

== Production ==
The first schedule of filming happened in Sudeshi Mill, Pondicherry in December 2016 where portions involving the lead casts Varalaxmi, Kishore and Vivek were shot for over ten days. The second schedule of the film with Sathyaraj started rolling in March 2017. Following this, portions involving Kishore, Vivek, and Yogi Babu were shot in North Madras. Filming wrapped up by April 2017.

== Soundtrack ==
The soundtrack was composed by Sundaramurthy KS.

Echcharikkai

Soundtrack album by Sundaramurthy KS
- Released: 2018
- Genre: Film soundtrack
- Length: 14:14
- Language: Tamil
- Producer: Sundaramurthy KS

Sundaramurthy KS chronology
| 8 Thottakkal (2017) | Echcharikkai (2018) | Kalavu (2019) |

Tracklist
| No. | Title | Singer(s) | Length |
|---|---|---|---|
| 1. | "Karma Is A Bitch" | Shivam, Udhay Kannan | 3:13 |
| 2. | "Odura Nari" | Sri Radha Bharath, Vijaynarain | 3:10 |
| 3. | "Kanne Kanmaniye" | Anand Aravindakshan | 3:57 |
| 4. | "Yaarum Ellai" | Sathya Prakash, Jananie S. V. | 3:54 |
| Total length: | | | 14:14 |
