= Kanda Naal Mudhal =

- Poster
- Directed by: V. Priya
- Written by: V. Priya
- Dialogue by: E. Ramdoss
- Produced by: Prakash Raj
- Starring: Prasanna; Laila; Karthik Kumar
- Cinematography: P. C. Sreeram
- Edited by: A. Sreekar Prasad
- Music by: Yuvan Shankar Raja
- Production company: Duet Movies
- Release date: 1 December 2005
- Running time: 129 minutes
- Country: India
- Language: Tamil
- Budget: ₹1.75 crores

Kanda Naal Mudhal (transl. From the day [I] saw [you]) is a 2005 Indian Tamil-language romantic comedy film written and directed by newcomer V. Priya. Produced by Prakash Raj under the Duet Movies banner, the film stars Prasanna and Laila, and Karthik Kumar, with Lakshmi, Revathi and Regina Cassandra in the supporting roles, with the latter making her debut with this film. The music was composed by Yuvan Shankar Raja. The film was released on 1 December 2005.

== Plot ==
The film begins with two kids Krishna and Ramya who fight with each other in a marriage hall. After several years, now Krishna and Ramya, college students, meet and again lock horns with each other, during a college cultural meet. Fate brings them together in Chennai after a few years, again fighting with each other.

Meanwhile, a series of events forces Krishna's close friend Aravind to come to India from the United States to get married. His parents arrange his wedding with Ramya, who is bold, active, independent and assertive in nature, but, Ramya decides to help her younger sister's love, displays herself as a passive character before Aravind who accepts whatever her life partner feel is right.

Knowing this, Krishna tries hard to let her true character come out before Aravind. However, Aravind stalls the wedding plans and returns to the US as he finds Ramya as a person who does not think on her own and is not independent. Mistaking Krishna for influencing Aravind, Ramya again locks horns with him.

Meanwhile, same day, when Ramya returns home, she finds her sister elopes with her lover which causes her mother to trauma and end up in the hospital. Ramya mistakes Krishna behind the call of her marriage by Aravind, elopement of her sister and health of her mother. All her sorrows, she feels Krishna in the middle.

Krishna comes to the help off the family and slowly Ramya knows his true nature in helping her family that of his one, she started to love him. Krishna eventually develops an affinity towards Ramya which turns into romance between them. Though respective sisters of Krishna and Ramya smells the blossom of love between Ramya and Krishna, but, both Krishna and Ramya delay to propose to each other.

When they both decide to propose to each other, Krishna playfully calls Aravind who declares his decision to marry Ramya. The climax was expected after the closeness between Ramya and Krishna. In the end, they both come to receive Aravind at the airport, they end up in each other's arms and Aravind also feels happy for them.

Film ends on a happy note as Ramya and Krishna marry. During the marriage happening, two kids randomly fight with each other just like the first time Ramya and Krishna met at first. Aravind also locks horns with a girl in during the event

== Cast ==
- Prasanna as Krishna
- Laila as Ramya
  - Baby Simran as young Ramya
- Karthik Kumar as Aravind
- Lakshmi as Ramani Amma
- Revathi as Maragatham
- Devadarshini as Krishna's sister
- Jagan as Krishna's friend
- Regina Cassandra as Latha, Ramya's sister
- Srinivasa Moorthy as Shankar
- Shalini Biswajit as Ramya's friend

Uncredited

- Mohan Babu AVP as Raj Ram
- Premgi Amaran in a special appearance in the song "Pushing It Hard"
- Andrea Jeremiah in a special appearance as the girl who bumps into Aravind

== Soundtrack ==
The soundtrack was composed by Yuvan Shankar Raja, with lyrics written by Thamarai. The Carnatic song "Kanda Naal Mudhalai", originally composed by N. S. Chidambaram, was remixed for the film. Singer Subhiksha Rangarajan was 15 years old when she recorded the song.

Track listing
No.	Title	Singer(s)	Length
1.	"Kanda Naal Mudhalai"	Subhiksha Rangarajan, Pooja Venkatraman	4:06
2.	"Pani Thuli"	KK, Shreya Ghoshal, Tanvi Shah	5:45
3.	"Erimalai Naane"	Shankar Mahadevan, Vasundhara Das	5:16
4.	"Merke Merke"	Shankar Mahadevan, Sadhana Sargam	5:08
5.	"Koo Koovena"	Karthik, Harish Raghavendra, Mahalakshmi Iyer	3:59
6.	"Pushing It Hard"	Yuvan Shankar Raja, Clinton Cerejo, Premgi Amaren	4:20
Total length:			32:42

== Release and reception ==
Kanda Naal Mudhal was initially scheduled to release on 16 September 2005, but ultimately released on 1 December 2005.

== Critical response ==
Shobha Warrier of Rediff.com wrote, "The fresh treatment and Priya's conviction are evident. But what goes against the film is its script." Malathi Rangarajan The Hindu wrote, "From the title to the treatment everything about Duet Movies' `Kanda Naal Mudhal' glistens with a poetic touch, and first-time filmmaker Priya V. proves with each frame that she's here to stay. Boy-girl tussles leading to love are not new to cinema. But plaudits to the way Priya weaves her story and characters into an enjoyable film!" Sify wrote, "Kanda Naal Mudhal directed by debutant Priya V is in good taste without a shred of vulgarity, violence or risque comedy that has become the bane of Tamil cinema. Priya deserves a pat on her back for weaving a gossamer romance like her mentor Mani sir did in [Mouna Ragam] or [Alai Payuthey]. But the film has its own minor drawbacks mostly in narration and lags especially in the second half".

Lajjavathi of Kalki praised the performances and characterisation of actors, Sriram's cinematography, Yuvan's music but panned the placement of songs and concluded saying even if it is a commercial film, Priya has followed a quality and style. With producers like Prakash Raj in search, anything becomes possible. Malini Mannath of Chennai Online wrote, "In her debut effort – after an apprenticeship with Maniratnam and some work on the small screen – Priya, who's scripted and directed the film, makes a sincere attempt to provide a clean family entertainer sans vulgarity, overt glamour, double-entendres, item numbers and fights. While the early part of the love-triangle moves at a steady pace with subtle humour weaved in, the script in the second half could certainly have been worked to better advantage".
