= Vivek Rajgopal =

Indian actor

- Education: Loyola College
- Occupation: Actor
- Years active: 2014–present
- Parent: Rajgopal (father)

Vivek Rajgopal is an Indian actor who works predominantly in Tamil-language films.

== Personal life ==
Vivek Rajgopal's mother tongue is Malayalam, but he settled in Tamil Nadu. His father Rajagopal is a film distributor. He studied visual communication at Loyola College, Chennai.

== Career ==
Vivek Rajgopal had an interest for acting and subsequently joined Koothu-P-Pattarai and trained under Guru Somasundaram. After playing supporting roles in Naanga and Mathapoo, he debuted in the lead role in Oru Modhal Oru Kadhal (2014) before getting his breakthrough with Echcharikkai (2018). He received the role after Ashok Selvan, who was supposed to do the role recommended Vivek's name. He was chosen to play a role in the web series Queen after the makers liked his performance in Echcharikkai.

== Filmography ==
- All films are in Tamil, unless otherwise noted.

Year	Film	Role	Notes
2012	Naanga	Babu	credited as Uday
2012	Sooriya Nagaram	Senthil	credited as Uday
2013	Mathapoo	Maali	
2014	Oru Modhal Oru Kadhal	Karthik	
2018	Echcharikkai	Thomas	
2021	Kshanam	Irfan	Malayalam film
2022	Jasper	Harish	
2023	Maruthi Nagar Police Station		
2024	Dange	Vikash	Simultaneously shot in Hindi and Tamil
2024	Por	Vikash	Simultaneously shot in Hindi and Tamil

=== Streaming television ===
Year	Film	Role	Platform	Ref.
2019	Queen	Pradeepan	MX Player	
2021	Vadham	Divakar	MX Player	
2024	Aindham Vedham	Mithran/AI Shakthi	ZEE5	
2025	Seruppugal Jaakirathai	Ilango	ZEE5	
