= Lakshmi Priyaa Chandramouli =

Indian actress

- Born: Chennai, Tamil Nadu, India
- Other name: LPC
- Occupation: Actress
- Years active: 2010–present

Lakshmi Priyaa Chandramouli is an Indian actress who predominantly works in Tamil films. She gained recognition by playing the titular role in Sivaranjiniyum Innum Sila Pengalum (2018) for which she won the National Film Award for Best Supporting Actress.

== Early life ==
Lakshmi Priyaa Chandramouli was born into Tamil family. After completing her master's in social work, specialising in human resources, from the Madras School of Social Work, she worked for a corporate company as an HR professional. As she wanted to pursue "something more creative", she started to work with the theatre group Evam, on their managerial side. Although she never got to act in their plays because of a tight work schedule, she called it "a great platform where I could easily learn how things transformed from paper to performance".

She joined gymnastics before she was 10 years old and started playing cricket, becoming a part of India's B national cricket team, under which she also played a series against the West Indies. She also pursues Ultimate Frisbee. A member of Chennai Ultimate Frisbee, she has regularly participated at Ultimate Frisbee competitions and has played on The India Masters team representing our nation in the Asia Oceanic tournament held in Philippines.

== Career ==
While selling tickets for one of Evam's plays, director Magizh Thirumeni approached and asked her to play a supporting role in his film Mundhinam Paartheney. She took leave from work and shot for ten days for the film. After working with director K. Balachander on one of his teleserials, and starting to audition for a role in the TV show, Dharmayudham, she decided to pursue acting full-time. She quit her job and attended several auditions for different roles in the show, eventually landing the role of Sharada. Her first film in a lead role was the black comedy Sutta Kadhai. She played a bold tribal girl called Silanthi in the film, which required her to perform stunts as well, and reviews on her performance were positive. Her sole 2014 release was Angels, which marked her Malayalam debut. Her next Tamil release was Kallappadam by debutant director Vadivel. About her role, she said that it was a "well defined and powerful character" and "emotionally very strong". Her portrayal of a retired actress, which Baradwaj Rangan described as the "most fascinating, refreshing character" in the film, was lauded by critics, with Sify stating that "Lakshmi Priya shines in the role". She has also played notable roles in films like Yagavarayinum Naa Kaakka, Kalam and Maya.

== Filmography ==
List of acting performances in film
Year	Film	Role	Language	Notes
2010	Mundhinam Paartheney	Prashanthi	Tamil	
2013	Gouravam	Saravanan/Jagapathi's wife	Tamil/Telugu	Bilingual film
2013	Sutta Kadhai	Silanthi	Tamil	
2014	Angels	Zaina	Malayalam	
2015	Kallappadam	Leena	Tamil	
2015	Yagavarayinum Naa Kaakka	Nila	Tamil	
2015	Maya	Swathi	Tamil	
2015	Salt Mango Tree	Priya	Malayalam	
2016	Kalaivu	Swathi	Tamil	Short film
2016	Malupu	Nila	Telugu	
2016	Kalam	Dheeksha	Tamil	
2016	Ayynoorum Ayynthum	Anu	Tamil	
2016	Revelations	Subha	Tamil	
2017	Ticket	Shalini	Tamil	
2017	Lakshmi	Lakshmi	Tamil	Short film
2017	Richie	Philomena	Tamil	
2018	Odu Raja Odu	Meera	Tamil	
2018	Sivaranjiniyum Innum Sila Pengalum	Sivaranjini	Tamil	National Film Award for Best Supporting Actress Special Jury Award at Chennai International Film Festival
2021	Karnan	Padmini	Tamil	South Indian International Movie Award for Best Supporting Actress
2021	Cold Case	Advocate Haritha	Malayalam	
2022	Payanigal Gavanikkavum	Tamizh	Tamil	
2023	Soppana Sundari	Thenmozhi	Tamil	
2025	Thanal	Robber's wife	Tamil	
2026	Oh Butterfly	Ranjani	Tamil	
2026	Carmeni Selvam	Shanthi	Tamil	

=== Television ===
Year	Title	Role	Network
2011-2012	Shanthi Nilayam	Ezhil	Jaya TV
2012	Dharmayutham	Sharada	STAR Vijay
2021	Survivor Tamil	Participant	Zee Tamil

=== Short films ===
List of acting performances in short film
Year	Film	Role	Language	Notes
2015	What If Batman Was From Chennai?	Catwoman / Mythili	English; Tamil	
2015	Batman Returns... To Chennai | The Middle Ages	Catwoman / Mythili	English; Tamil	
2021–2025	Kalaivu; Kalaivu The Reprise		Tamil	

== Awards ==
- National Film Award for Best Supporting Actress in 2020 for Sivaranjiniyum Innum Sila Pengalum
- SIIMA Award 2022 for Best Supporting Actress—Tamil for Karnan
- JFW Movie Awards 2022, Best Actress Jury for Sivaranjiniyum Innum Sila Pengalum
- Special Jury award for Sivaranjiniyum Innum Sila Pengalum at the Chennai International Film Festival 2022
