= V. Priya =

Indian film director

- Occupations: Director, screenwriter, actress
- Years active: 1991; 1999–present

V. Priya is an Indian film director, who works predominantly in Tamil films and television.

== Career ==
Priya worked as an assistant to director Mani Ratnam after learning her craft under Suhasini. She made her directorial debut with romantic-comedy Kanda Naal Mudhal (2005) starring Prasanna, Laila and Karthik Kumar. The film received positive critical acclaim during its release with critics praising "Priya deserves a pat on her back for weaving a gossamer romance like her mentor Mani Ratnam sir did in Mouna Ragam or Alaipayuthey. But the film has its own minor drawbacks mostly in narration and lags especially in the second half". The film did well at box-office. However, her second film Kannamoochi Yenada (2007) starring Prithviraj, Sandhya and Sathyaraj received mixed reviews from critics, but it was also commercially successful. In 2008, she planned her third project titled Cheri, but the film did not materialize. She alongside her husband Bhushan Kalyan worked as creative director for television series Uyirmei which was telecasted in Zee Tamil.

After a long gap, she made her comeback to film direction with Aadi Lakshmi Puraana (2018) which marks her debut in Kannada cinema. In 2022, She directed Anantham. In 2024, she directed Pon Ondru Kanden (2024) starring Ashok Selvan, Vasanth Ravi and Aishwarya Lekshmi.

== Filmography ==
- Note: all work is in Tamil, unless otherwise noted.

=== As director and screenwriter ===
Year	Title	Credited as		Notes
Year	Title	Director	Writer	Notes
2002	Mitr, My Friend		Yes	English film
2005	Kanda Naal Mudhal	Yes	Yes	
2007	Kannamoochi Yenada	Yes	Yes	
2008	Herova? Zerova?	Yes	Yes	Short film
2018	Aadi Lakshmi Puraana	Yes	Yes	Kannada film
2024	Pon Ondru Kanden	Yes	Yes	

=== Television ===
Year	Title	Credited as		Network	Notes
Year	Title	Director	Writer	Network	Notes
1999	Ganesh & Vasanth	Yes		Sun TV	Co-directed by Suhasini Maniratnam; story based on Sujatha's Ganesh–Vasanth
2000	Anbulla Snegithey	Yes		Sun TV	
2022	Anantham	Yes	Yes	Zee5	

As an actress

- Penn (1991)
- Vikrant Rona (2022; Kannada)
