= RPP Film Factory =

Indian film company

- Type: Proprietorship Company
- Founded: 2013
- Headquarters: Chennai, India
- Key people: Prashanth Palanikumar
- Products: Distribution, Production
- Website: http://rppfilmfactory.blogspot.in

RPP Film Factory is a film distribution and production company owned by Prashanth Palanikumar who is one of the founders of the famous production house Studio 9 Production. Founded in 2013, it started distributing films like Kalyana Samayal Saadham and Enna Satham Indha Neram, which entered the Limca Book of Records. RPP Film Factory is known for distributing film of various genres and identifying good talents and content. They have been promoting small budget films with extraordinary content.

== History ==
RPP Film Factory was founded by Prashanth Palanikumar a Visual Communication graduate from Loyola College, Chennai. He had worked in many films in technical and creative departments before entering into production and distribution. He was one of the founders of Studio 9 production which had distributed critically acclaimed film like Saattai, Naduvula Konjam Pakkatha Kaanom, Paradesi, and Masani. Due to misunderstandings between the directors the company was dissolved. Later he launched his own banner for producing and distributing films.

== Upcoming Projects ==
"Kalyana Samayal Saadham" was remade in Hindi with "Ayushman Khurrana" and "Bhumi Pednekar" as "Shubh Mangal Saavdhan". Two films are under production with leading cast and crew.

== Filmography ==
As distributor
Year	Film	Director	Cast	Music director	Genre	Release date
2013	Pizza II: Villa	Deepan Chakravarthy	Ashok Selvan, Sanchita Shetty, Nassar, S. J. Surya, Kaali Venkat	Santhosh Narayanan	Suspense supernatural thriller	14-11-2013
2013	Kalyana Samayal Saadham	R. S. Prasanna	Prasanna, Lekha Washington, Delhi Ganesh, Uma Padmanabhan, Crazy Mohan	Navin Chander	Romantic-Comedy	06-12-2013
2014	Enna Satham Indha Neram	Guru Ramesh	Jayam Raja, Malavika Wales, Nithin Sathya, Maanu	Naga	Comedy-Thriller	27-06-2014
2014	Irukku Aana Illai	K.M Saravanan	Vivanth, Eden Kuriakose, Manisha Shree, Y Gee Mahendran	Shammeer	Horror-Comedy	18-07-2014
2015	Enakkul Oruvan	Prasad Ramar	Siddarth, Deepa Sannidhi, Aadukalam Naren, John Vijay, Srushti Dange	Santhosh Narayanan	Psychological Thriller	06-03-2015
2016	Kadhalum Kadandhu Pogum	Nalan Kumarasamy	Vijay Sethupathi, Madonna Sebastian, Samuthirakani	Santhosh Narayanan	Romantic Comedy	11-03-2016
