= Nibunan =

2017 Indian film by Arun Vaidyanathan

Nibunan / Vismaya
- Theatrical release poster in Tamil
- Directed by: Arun Vaidyanathan
- Screenplay by: Anand Raghav; Arun Vaidyanathan
- Story by: Arun Vaidyanathan
- Produced by: Sudhan Sundaram; Umesh; Jayaram; Arun Vaidyanathan
- Starring: Arjun Sarja; Prasanna; Varalaxmi Sarathkumar; Sruthi Hariharan; Vaibhav
- Cinematography: Arvind Krishna
- Edited by: Sathish Suriya
- Music by: S. Navin
- Production company: Passion Film Factory
- Distributed by: I Studios Entertainment
- Release date: 28 July 2017
- Running time: 130 minutes
- Country: India
- Languages: Tamil; Kannada

Nibunan (transl. Expert) is a 2017 Indian action thriller film co-produced and directed by Arun Vaidyanathan. The film stars Arjun Sarja in his 150th film, alongside Prasanna, Varalaxmi Sarathkumar, Sruthi Hariharan, and Vaibhav Reddy. The music was composed by S. Navin, while the cinematography and editing were handled by Arvind Krishna and Sathish Suriya. It was simultaneously filmed in Tamil and Kannada, with the Kannada version titled Vismaya (transl. Amazing).

The Kannada and Tamil version of the film was theatrically released on 28 July 2017 to mixed reviews from critics. The film was dubbed in Telugu as Kurukshetram (transl. Battlefield) and was released in September 2018.

== Plot ==
Ranjith Kalidoss is a DSP in CB-CID, who along with Inspectors Joseph and Vandana, takes on high-profile cases and closes them successfully. Counter to his high intensity job, Ranjith has a peaceful family life with his wife, Shilpa, daughter Oviya, younger brother Sandeep, and their family dog Rocky. Ranjith's superiors assigns his team a task to pursue a group of 5 criminals, who continue to avoid justice with their political and economic influence. Ranjith suggests a more direct approach to taking them out, but his superior declines to go along with it. Before they could pursue the current assignment, they get dragged into another mystery. A parcel arrives at the police station one day that contains a small horse doll hanging on a noose. The figure has 4 holes, but otherwise no other clues.

Not thinking much of it, the team decides to ignore it. A few days later, Shivanand, a local communist leader, goes missing and is later found in the warehouse hanging from the ceiling, tortured and his face covered in an animal mask, very much like the doll they received. Meanwhile, Ranjith is diagnosed with Parkinson's disease that compromises his job, and his happiness with his family is strained. The killer continues to taunt the team by sending clues as he kills more people, which includes Vishnu, a lawyer and Dr. Ramya, a pathologist. Ranjith follows one of the clues and finds the killer, but before he could take him down, the tremors that he has been experiencing lately slow him down. The killer knocks out Ranjith and escapes.

When his team arrives, they inform him about a dead body in one of the buildings, but he already knows and describes what he would find without seeing it, also deduces that he himself is the killer's next target. Back at the office, Ranjith manages to piece things together and connects the serial killings to a case that he investigated a few years earlier. Emmanuel and his wife are a rich architect couple in town, who lived with their 16-year-old daughter Catherine and a caretaker Mariadas. The couple were very successful business people, but had very little time for their daughter. Mariadas took care of Catherine. One day, the couple came home to find Catherine murdered and Mariadas missing. The house had been ransacked. The police closes the case concluding that it was a burglary gone bad, and Mariadas is on the run.

Shivanand pushes to reopen the case, which lands with Ranjith. He quickly focuses the attention on Emmanuel, where he sees a new golf club in his bag, and his investigation leads to the missing golf club with the caretaker's blood on it. He interrogates Emmanuel and his wife with the evidence, and they confess the truth. They came home one day to find Mariadas having sex with Catherine. Catherine only reached puberty a few days earlier, and their parents were busy preparing for the puberty ceremony. Enraged, Emmanuel hits Mariadas with the club and kills him. When Catherine threatens to call the police, her mother tries to stop her. In the scuffle, she accidentally falls on a sharp object and dies. Not able to wiggle their way out (as Ranjith and Vishnu refuse to take bribes and hush up the truth) and driven by guilt, Emmanuel and his wife hang themselves. Dr. Ramya is involved in the autopsy of Catherine, and the prosecutor is set to argue the case at the court and is present with Ranjith during the interrogation and confession.

While all this is happening, Ranjith finds a doll hanging outside his house. When coming back, his dog Rocky was shot in the head. The killer is someone seeking vengeance for the deaths of the couple and is probably connected to the family. His boss takes over the case and tells Ranjith to get medical help for his condition. Joseph and Vandana continues the investigation, looking for a connection between Ranjith's case and the murders. There were no other family members that could be the murderer. Emmanuel has a nephew named Christopher, but he lives in the US. They are looking for someone with pharmaceutical knowledge, as the killer manufactured his own brand of anesthesia to knock out his victims.

Ranjith gets admitted to the hospital, where he continues to crack the clues, he concludes that it must be Christopher, as he has the motive, means and the know how. After checking with immigration services, they learn that Christopher did arrive in India not too long ago. A cop is dispatched to Christopher's house to investigate, and he finds all the evidence supporting their theory, but before he could alert his team, he is killed. Christopher baits Ranjith's team and captures Joseph and Vandana. Having no choice, Ranjith leaves the hospital to meet Christopher at a warehouse. There, he finds Joseph and Vandana standing on the floor with nooses around their necks. After a long struggle, Ranjith manages to overpower Christopher and hangs him. The press arrives at the site, and Ranjith tells them that Christopher is another victim of the serial killer.

A few days later, Joseph and Vandana meet Ranjith at his house and ask him why he did not inform the press that Christopher was the serial killer. Ranjith then reveals his plan about their earlier assignment. He plans to kill the five criminals and blame it on the serial killer, and also frame the last of them as the serial killer himself. Later, it is shown that his plan worked.

== Cast ==
- Arjun as DSP Ranjith Kalidass, CB-CID
- Prasanna as Inspector Joseph, CB-CID
- Varalaxmi Sarathkumar as Inspector Vandhana, CB-CID
- Sruthi Hariharan as Shilpa, Ranjith's wife
- Vaibhav as Sandeep, Ranjith's brother
- Krishna Kulasekaran as Christopher (Tamil)
  - Karthik Jayaram as Christopher (Kannada)
- Suman as Emmanuel
- Suhasini as Mrs. Emmanuel
- Chandana Raj as Catherine Emmanuel
- Uma Riyaz Khan as Dr. Ramya
- Sudha Rani as Dr. Prema
- Poster Nandakumar as Shivanand
- Chetan as Mariadas
- Baby Swaksha as Oviya
- David Solomon Raja as Inspector
- Kishore Vashista as Dr. Varghese
- Barath Neelakantan as Hospital Security
- Vaidyanathan Padmanabhan as Lawyer Vishnu
- Arandhai Rajagopal as Shivanand's assistant

== Production ==
In July 2015, director Arun Vaidyanathan announced that he began working on a new action thriller film featuring Arjun in the lead role, which would be his 150th film as an actor. He revealed that the film would be based around the adventures of a police officer, and it would be made simultaneously in Tamil and Kannada, with filming taking place in Chennai and Bangalore. Vaidyanathan stated the script had been on his mind for several years, but he only began scripting it from December 2014. Umesh, Sudhan and Jayaram of Passion Film Factory, who had earlier made Kappal (2014), agreed to produce the film, while Arvind Krishna and Sathish Suriya were signed as cinematographer and editor, respectively. Actors Prasanna, Vaibhav and Bobby Simha were signed on to play further leading roles during August 2015, though Simha later opted out. Likewise, Varalaxmi Sarathkumar was selected to appear as a police officer, and Sruthi Hariharan was signed on to play the wife of Arjun's character. Following six months of pre-production, the film began canning scenes in November 2015 in Bangalore. In May 2017, the team chose to release the film's teaser by requesting 150 celebrities in the Indian film industry to release it via their Twitter page. The film's base plot is based on the 2008 Noida double murder case.

== Soundtrack ==
Nibunan

Soundtrack album by Navin
- Released: 2017
- Recorded: 30 June 2017
- Genre: Soundtrack
- Length: 12:42
- Language: Tamil
- Label: Zee Music Company
- Producer: Navin

Navin chronology
Vil Ambu (2015)	Nibunan (2017)	Naalu Peruku Nalladhuna Edhuvum Thappilla (2017)

Vismaya

Soundtrack album by Navin
- Released: 2017
- Recorded: 18 June 2017
- Genre: Soundtrack
- Length: 12:42
- Language: Kannada
- Label: Zee Music Company
- Producer: Navin

The film's music was composed by Navin, and the album was released on 30 June 2017 by Zee Music South, featuring four songs.

Track list
No.	Title	Lyrics	Singer(s)	Length
1.	"Vaa Daa Modi Paakalam"	Arunraja Kamaraj	Arunraja Kamaraj	3:39
2.	"Idhuvum Kadandu Poogum"	Arun Vaidyanathan	Pradeep Kumar	3:58
3.	"Kaakichattaiku Marupakkam"	Madhan Karky	Navin	3:15
4.	"Hunt of the Shadows" (Instrumental)			1:50
Total length:				12:42

Kannada Track list
No.	Title	Lyrics	Singer(s)	Length
1.	"Ba Ba Baaro"	Balaji Nag, Umesh	Arunraja Kamaraj	3:39
2.	"Nam-Ee Olave Sashwatha"	Balaji Nag	Vasuki Vaibhav	3:58
3.	"Kaaki Shirt-Ina"	Balaji Nag, Roger Narayan	Vasuki Vaibhav	3:15
4.	"Hunt of the Shadows" (Instrumental)			1:50
Total length:				12:42

== Release ==
The Tamil and Kannada versions of the film were released across India on 28 July 2017, where the satellite rights for the Tamil, Kannada and Telugu version were sold to Polimer TV, Colors Kannada and Zee Telugu.

== Critical reception ==
The film received primarily mixed reviews from critics. For Nibunan, a critic from The Times of India wrote, "watch it for the suspense-filled plot which has decent family moments, the surprise killer and the way the team uncovers the mystery through mind games", while rating the film with three and a half stars. India Today called the film a "convincing whodunnit", while The Hindu's reviewer called it a "killer premise". Meanwhile, for Vismaya, a reviewer from the Deccan Herald concluded that the film was "an edgy crime thriller" with a "nifty narrative", while the Times of India wrote it is "an interesting watch for those who like their films to have them at the edge of their seats". Likewise, The New Indian Express's critic wrote it was a "smart thriller" that "manages to extract thrills and nuggets of applause from a display of the vagaries of human psyche". In contrast, The Hindustan Times wrote the film gets "predictable and tedious beyond a point". Baradwaj Rangan of Film Companion wrote "The director, Arun Vaidyanathan, nails a vibe that lies midway between the fantasy universe of our masala films and the grungy netherworlds of Hollywood’s serial-killer thrillers..."

== Controversy ==
In October 2018, as part of the #MeToo movement, actress Shruthi Hariharan accused Arjun of misconduct, on the set of the film, where she portrayed his wife. In response, Arjun Sarja denied her allegations and filed a Rs 5 crore defamation suit against her.

After Arjun's defamation case was filed, Sruthi filed a sexual harassment case with the police with a new set of stories. The Bangalore Police immediately investigated this case and they submitted their report also. In their report, they said there was "no evidence" in favour of her. In this investigation, all crew members of this film said there was no such incident that happened on the sets and director Arun Vaidyanathan who was named as the eye-witness in the case, said Arjun Sarja is a nice person. The romantic scene script was already finalized before the shooting. According to the director, Arjun Sarja had asked the filmmaker to reduce the romantic scenes in the movie. He had also said that Arjun Sarja and Sruthi Hariharan were good friends and he never noticed Arjun Sarja misbehaving with Sruthi on the sets.

A few months after the MeToo fallout, Sruthi told The News Minute that while she used to get plenty of offers before, she hardly gets any now.
