= Thiravam =

Indian webseries by Arvind Krishna on Zee5

- Original title: திரவம்
- Genre: Thriller; Drama
- Written by: Ravi Prakasam
- Directed by: Arvind Krishna
- Starring: Prasanna; Indhuja Ravichandran; Kaali Venkat; Azhagam Perumal
- Country of origin: India
- Original language: Tamil
- No. of seasons: 1
- No. of episodes: 8 (list of episodes)

Production
- Cinematography: Anbu Dennis
- Running time: 32 mins (approx.)
- Production company: Anantya Entertainment

Original release
- Network: Zee5
- Release: 21 May 2019

Thiravam (English: Fluid) is a 2019 Indian-Tamil-language Thriller streaming television series created by Ravi Prakasam for Zee5. The series was directed by Arvind Krishna, starring Prasanna, Indhuja Ravichandran, Kaali Venkat and Azhagam Perumal. This Political Drama revolves around Scientist Ravi Prakasam's formula that can create Pertrol from Herbs and a number of groups who are after him and his Formula for their own gains. The first season consists of eight episodes and it started streaming from 21 May 2019.

== Cast ==
- Prasanna as Ravi Prakasam
- Indhuja as Sahana
- Kaali Venkat as Sengi
- Azhagam Perumal
- John Vijay
- Swayam Siddha
- Nagendra Prasad
- Monekha Siva
- Senthil

== Episodes ==
| No. | Title | Directed by | Written by | Original release date |
|---|---|---|---|---|
| 1 | "The Great Escape" | Arvind Krishna | Ravi Prakasam | 21 May 2019 |
A case is filed against Ravi Prakasam claiming his Herbal Petrol to be a Scam. Ravi Prakasam is kidnapped outside the court premises by unknown people. When he escapes their hold, a gangster attempts to kill him. Now, how does he get away?
| 2 | "Ravi Talks about the Formula" | Arvind Krishna | Ravi Prakasam | 21 May 2019 |
A mafia gang come looking for Ravi at his house. Raviprakasam hides and flees from there with his daughter safely. An international gangster, politician and party member meet to discuss Ravi Prakasam. Sahana asks Ravi for the formula. Does he open up?
| 3 | "Scientists vs Ravi" | Arvind Krishna | Ravi Prakasam | 21 May 2019 |
Ravi demonstrates his invention at IIT premises in the presence of various scientists. His demonstration works well and scientists approve of it initially. Once the scientists seem to get information from an unknown source, they ask for a demonstration of the same. Ravi is puzzled, what could the information be?
| 4 | "Herbs and Formule Get Stolen" | Arvind Krishna | Ravi Prakasam | 21 May 2019 |
An unidentified person is seen stealing Herbal Solutions from Ravi's house. Who could it be? Another group get their hands on Ravi's Formula, Ravi who notices this has to choose between saving his daughter and running after his formula.
| 5 | "Doss Kidnaps RP" | Arvind Krishna | Ravi Prakasam | 21 May 2019 |
The unidentified person is caught by Doss, the gangster and is forced to prepare the petrol with the Herbal Solutions he stole. Panimalar tells Ravi that a hard disk that has the formula has been stolen from her. Gangster Doss catches hold of RP at Panimalar's House.
| 6 | "Ravi gets a Second Chance" | Arvind Krishna | Ravi Prakasam | 21 May 2019 |
Bhaskar intends to come in Doss's way. When things are all over the place Ravi gets an unexpected opportunity to prove himself. Sahana approaches Edward to ensure the safety of the opportunity, but she is shocked with a revelation.
| 7 | "The Last Resort" | Arvind Krishna | Ravi Prakasam | 21 May 2019 |
Ravi gets ready to prove his formula with protection in front of officials. Just before he performs he learns a successful demonstration could cost him badly. How does he handle it when important officials, political people and media are watching?
| 8 | "When Mafia gets it all" | Arvind Krishna | Ravi Prakasam | 21 May 2019 |
Ravi has been losing his friends one by one. After all the cat and mouse drama in between the small players, the mafia gets their hands on the formula. They plan to leave the country with it. But can they get away with it easily?
