= Navin (music director) =

S. Navin
- Also known as: Arrora
- Born: Navin Chandar; Chennai, Tamil Nadu, India
- Occupation: Music director
- Instruments: Flute, Keyboard, Saxophone
- Years active: 2013–present

Navin is an Indian film score and soundtrack composer, who has predominantly scored music for Tamil and Malayalam films.

== Career ==
Navin began to learn the flute aged five and continued to learn both Carnatic and Western interpretations of the instrument throughout his childhood. In 2005, he received an opportunity to work on the "Luka Chupi" song in Rang De Basanti (2006) as a flute player in A. R. Rahman's music, and the opportunity marked his first film performance. Navin worked as a flute player for more composers including Harris Jayaraj and G. V. Prakash Kumar, before working as a music composer on R. S. Prasanna's Kalyana Samayal Saadham (2013). For the film, he preferred to be credited under the stagename of Arrora however he later reverted to his real name. He later also worked on the Mohanlal-starrer, Peruchazhi (2014), his first release in Malayalam.

He has since worked on the compositions of Tamil films including Oru Naal Iravil (2015) and Vil Ambu (2016), notably picking three music composers to record songs for his work in the latter. His biggest venture as a film composer till date is the 2014 Malayalam film Peruchazhi directed by Arun Vaidyanathan starring Mohanlal.

== Discography ==
- The films are listed in order that the music released, regardless of the dates the film released.

Year	Tamil	Other Language(s)	Notes
2013	Kalyana Samayal Saadham		credited as Arrora
2014		Peruchazhi (Malayalam)	
2014		On A Quest (English)	
2015	Oru Naal Iravil		
2015	Vil Ambu		
2017	Nibunan		
2017	Naalu Peruku Nalladhuna Edhuvum Thappilla		
