= Shot Boot Three =

- Theatrical release poster
- Directed by: Arun Vaidyanathan
- Written by: Arun Vaidyanathan
- Screenplay by: Anand Raghav; Arun Vaidyanathan
- Produced by: Arun Vaidyanathan
- Starring: Venkat Prabhu; Sneha
- Cinematography: Sudarshan Srinivasan
- Edited by: Barath Vikraman
- Music by: Rajhesh Vaidhya
- Production company: Universe Creations
- Release date: 6 October 2023
- Country: India
- Language: Tamil

Shot Boot Three is a 2023 Indian Tamil-language children's film written, directed and produced by Arun Vaidyanathan. The film stars Sneha and Venkat Prabhu with Yogi Babu, Sivaangi Krishnakumar, Poovaiyar, Praniti, Kailash Heet and Vedanth Vasanth in supporting roles.

== Plot ==
A new pet friend brings great joy to the lives of four kids, but when Max disappears, the kids embark on a journey to find him. Their experiences along the way shape their understanding of life and their own personalities.

== Cast ==
- Sneha as Shyamala
- Venkat Prabhu as Swaminathan
- Yogi Babu as Thala Kumar
- Sivaangi Krishnakumar as Pet Revathi
- Poovaiyar as Ramana
- Praniti as Pallavi
- Kailash Heet as Kailash
- Vedanth Vasanth as Ballu
- Delhi Ganesh
- Arun Vaidyanathan as Dr. Shekar
- Kavithalayaa Krishnan

== Production ==
The film was announced in September 2021 with the working title Shot Boot 3. The cinematography of the film was by Sudarshan Srinivasan, and the editing was handled by Barath Vikraman.

== Music ==
The music for the film was composed by Rajhesh Vaidhya.

== Release ==
The film was released on 6 October 2023.

== Reception ==
Logesh Balachandran of The Times of India gave the film 3 out of 5 stars and wrote, "A heart-warming tale for kids." Narayani M of Cinema Express gave it 3 out of 5 stars and wrote, "Shot Boot Three may not be a film where you would hoot, cheer and whistle for the characters or throw confetti at. But director Arunachalam Vaidyanathan gives us a story that leaves us all warm and fuzzy as the credits roll."

== Accolades ==
Awards	Category	Position
ICAFF - International Companion Animal Film Festival (2022)	Best FIlm	Winner
Atlanta Children's Film Festival (2023)	Best Film	Winner
International Motion Picture Awards	Best Film	Winner
Nepal Cultural International Film Festival (2023)	Best FIlm	Winner
CHINH India Kids Film Festival	Best Film	Finalist
Siff-Serbest International Film Festival (2022)	Best Film	Semi Finalist
