= Arun Vaidyanathan =

American actor

- Born: Arunachalam; Sirkazhi, Tamil Nadu, India
- Occupations: Film director; Film producer; Screenwriter
- Years active: 2009–present

Arun Vaidyanathan is an Indian-American film director who works predominantly in Tamil-language films. He directed his first full-length feature film in Tamil, Achchamundu! Achchamundu!, which released in July 2009. He produced a Tamil romantic-comedy film, Kalyana Samayal Saadham in 2013. In 2014, he directed Mohanlal in a Malayalam-language political satire film, Peruchazhi.

== Early life and career ==
In 2008, he began working on his debut Tamil feature film, Achchamundu! Achchamundu! is a bilingual social thriller starring Prasanna, Sneha and John Shea. The film was shot in New Jersey and New York during early 2008 and subsequently released in 2009. The film premiered in New Jersey's Garden State Film Festival, and shared 'Best Homegrown Feature Film' award with Dorothy Lyman's Split Ends Ethaya Rajan along with Ananth Govindan produced an Indian Tamil romantic-comedy film written and directed by RS Prasanna, Kalyana Samayal Saadham. It features Prasanna and Lekha Washington in lead roles, Krishnan Vasant and Arora as the cinematographer and music composer respectively. The film was covered as part of the TV series Born to Explore with Richard Wiese. Richard Wiese, who features in the show, in his interview with KSS director RS Prasanna, focused on two points – Indian weddings, their universal appeal, and the growing interest in stories and movies based in India

He then directed Nibunan / Vismaya, a bilingual film starring Arjun Sarja, Varalakshmi Sarathkumar, Prasanna, Sruthi Hariharan, Vaibhav Reddy, Suhasini Maniratnam and Suman. Along with Anand Raghav, he has penned the dialogues and screenplay for the film which is being produced by Passion Film Factory who also produced Kappal (2014).

== Filmography ==
=== As a film director ===
Year	Film	Credited as			Language	Notes
Year	Film	Director	Writer	Producer	Language	Notes
2009	Achchamundu! Achchamundu!	Yes	Yes	Yes	Tamil; English	Shanghai International Film Festival- Official Selection; Garden State Film Festival – Best Homegrown Film; Chennai International Film Festival – Best Film; 32nd Moscow International Film Festival – Official Selection; 17th Minsk International Film Festival "Listapad" – Official Selection; 33rd Cairo International Film Festival – Official Selection; International Film Festival of India- Official Selection; Asia-Pacific Film Festival – Official Selection
2013	Kalyana Samayal Saadham	No	Dialogues	Yes	Tamil	Additional dialogues only
2014	Peruchazhi	Yes	Yes	No	Malayalam	
2017	Nibunan	Yes	Yes	Yes	Tamil	Bilingual film
2017	Vismaya	Yes	Yes	Yes	Kannada	Bilingual film
2023	Shot Boot Three	Yes	Yes	Yes	Tamil	Also actor

=== As an actor ===
Year	Title	Role	Notes
2023	Aneethi		
2023	Takkar	Vaidy	
2023	Shot Boot Three	Dr. Shekar	

=== Frequent collaborators ===
Collaborator	Achchamundu! Achchamundu!; (2009)	Kalyana Samayal Saadham; (2013)	Peruchazhi; (2014)	Nibunan; (2017)	Shot Boot Three; (2023)
Prasanna	Yes	Yes		Yes	
Navin		Yes	Yes	Yes	
Delhi Ganesh		Yes	Yes (Cameo)		Yes
Sneha	Yes				Yes
