= Poster Nandakumar =

Indian Tamil actor

- Born: 26 August 1967 (age 59); Tamil Nadu, India
- Occupations: Actor, producer

Nandakumar, better known as Poster Nandakumar (born August 26, 1967) is an Indian actor, producer and poster distributor, who has worked in Tamil language films. He made a breakthrough as an actor with his performances in Madras (2014) and Vil Ambu (2016), while also serving as the producer in the latter.

== Career ==
Nandakumar runs Chennai's biggest film poster distribution service and heads up the family business which began in the 1950s. In 2013, Nandakumar was also involved in the pre-production of Pandiraj's Idhu Namma Aalu (2016) and was set to produce the film before T. Rajender asked to take over the venture. When visiting Studio Green's office to discuss the distribution of film posters, Nandakumar was spotted by director Pa. Ranjith, who requested him to work as an actor in the film, Madras (2014). After initial reluctance, Nandakumar agreed and the film subsequently went on to perform well at the box office, bringing Nandakumar further offers and the SIIMA Award for Best Actor in a Negative Role. Nandakumar later went on to produce and act in the film, Vil Ambu (2016), directed by Ramesh Subramaniam.

He has worked in Rajinikanth-starrer Kabali (2016) and Lal Salaam (2024), Nibunan (2016) and Rukkumani Vandi Varudhu (2016).

== Filmography ==
Year	Film	Role	Notes
2014	Madras	Kannan	SIIMA Award for Best Actor in a Negative Role
2016	Kathakali	Ex-MLA	
2016	Vil Ambu	Sekar	Also producer
2016	Kabali	Anbu	
2016	Maaveeran Kittu	Nellai Varathan	
2017	Bongu	Bhai	
2017	Sathriyan	Minister	
2017	Nibunan	Shivanand	
2017	Balloon		
2018	Sketch	Nanda	
2018	Koottali		
2018	Silukkuvarupatti Singam	Arumuga Perumal	
2019	Aruvam	Mahadevan	
2020	Pachai Vilakku	Periyavar	
2021	Sarpatta Parambarai		
2022	Etharkkum Thunindhavan	Minister	
2023	The Great Indian Kitchen	father	
2023	Kazhuvethi Moorkkan	K. T. A. K. Party leader	
2024	Lal Salaam	Nandakumar	
2024	Yaavarum Vallavare		
2024	Hit List		
2024	Maharaja	School Correspondent	
2025	Address †	TBA	
