= Fingertip season 2 =

Fingertip
- Season 2
- Starring: Prasanna; Regina Cassandra; Aparna Balamurali; Vinoth Kishan; Sharath Ravi
- No. of episodes: 13

Release
- Original network: Zee5
- Original release: 17 June 2022

Fingertip (Season 2) is a Tamil-language television series directed by Srinivasan Shivakar starring Prasanna, Aparana Balamurali, Regina Cassandra, Vinoth Kishan, Kanna Ravi, and Sharath Ravi. Fingertip Season 2 premiered on June 17, 2022, on ZEE5.

== Plot ==
The lives of six individuals get severely affected by the ever-changing digital space. While some of them are predators, others are victims of cybercrime and digital depression.

== Cast ==
- Aparna Balamurali
- Prasanna as ACP Arivazhagan Arivu IPS
- Regina Cassandra
- Vinoth Kishan
- Sharath Ravi
- Kanna Ravi
- G. Marimuthu
- Kitty
- Jeeva Ravi
- Deepakraj Gunasekaran
