= Sitaare Zameen Par =

2025 Indian film by R. S. Prasanna

- Theatrical release poster
- Directed by: R. S. Prasanna
- Screenplay by: Divy Nidhi Sharma
- Based on: Champions by: David Marqués; Javier Fesser
- Produced by: Aamir Khan; Aparna Purohit
- Starring: Aamir Khan; Genelia D'Souza
- Cinematography: G. Srinivas Reddy
- Edited by: Charu Shree Roy
- Music by: Songs: Shankar–Ehsaan–Loy; Score: Ram Sampath
- Production company: Aamir Khan Productions
- Distributed by: PVR Inox Pictures (India); AA Films (international)
- Release date: 20 June 2025
- Running time: 158 minutes
- Country: India
- Language: Hindi
- Budget: ₹122 crore
- Box office: est. ₹266.49 crore

Sitaare Zameen Par (lit. 'Stars on Earth') is a 2025 Indian Hindi-language sports comedy-drama film directed by R. S. Prasanna, written by Divy Nidhi Sharma, and produced by Aamir Khan and Aparna Purohit. A spiritual successor to Khan's 2007 film Taare Zameen Par and an official remake of the 2018 Spanish film Champions, it stars Khan and Genelia Deshmukh and follows a suspended basketball coach who must serve community service by helping a team of players with disabilities prepare for a tournament.

The film was announced in October 2023. Principal photography took place in India over four months before completing in June 2024.

Sitaare Zameen Par was released on 20 June 2025. The film grossed ₹266 crore worldwide and emerged as the seventh highest-grossing Hindi film of 2025 as well as the eleventh highest-grossing Indian film of 2025.

== Plot ==
Gulshan Arora is a once-promising but now disillusioned assistant basketball coach, whose career takes an unexpected turn when he is assigned to train a team of intellectually challenged basketball players as a punishment from court because of drunk and driving. Initially, Gulshan finds the task incredibly challenging, struggling to connect with his new team due to their unique conditions and individual needs. His patience is frequently tested, and he often feels overwhelmed by the responsibility.

As Gulshan grudgingly begins working with the team, he slowly starts to understand their individual struggles and strengths. A significant turning point in his coaching approach comes when he helps Guddu, one of the players, overcome his debilitating fear of bathing, a phobia that has caused significant distress. This small victory marks the beginning of a deeper bond between Gulshan and his team. During this period, the team gains a new, charismatic member, Golu Khan, whose infectious enthusiasm further brightens the group's spirits and dynamic.

Despite the numerous hurdles, the team's dedication and spirit remain strong. Their efforts culminate in them qualifying for a major basketball tournament in Mumbai. The journey to the city becomes a period of personal growth for Gulshan as well. While en route, he confronts and ultimately overcomes his own long-standing phobia of lifts, a personal battle he had previously avoided. Upon arriving in Mumbai, Gulshan receives a shock when he discovers that his mother is romantically involved with their family cook, a revelation that deeply unsettles him and adds a layer of personal turmoil to his professional commitments.

The much-anticipated tournament finally arrives. The team, despite their best efforts and renewed confidence, ultimately loses the final match. However, the outcome does not diminish their spirits. Instead of despairing, the players and Gulshan celebrate their journey, their improvements, and the bonds they have forged. In a moment of realization, Gulshan understands that while he believed he was coaching them, the players had, in fact, been his true coaches, teaching him invaluable lessons about resilience, acceptance, and joy.

The film concludes on a heartwarming note as Gulshan, who had previously been hesitant about starting a family, embraces the news that his wife, Sunita, is pregnant with their first child, symbolizing his complete personal transformation and newfound readiness for fatherhood.

== Cast ==
- Aamir Khan as Gulshan Arora
- Genelia D'Souza as Sunita Arora, Gulshan's wife
- Aroush Datta as Satbir
- Gopi Krishnan Varma as Guddu
- Vedant Sharmaa as Bantu
- Naman Misra as Hargovind
- Rishi Shahani as Sharmaji
- Rishabh Jain as Raju
- Ashish Pendse as Sunil Gupta
- Samvit Desai as Karim Qureshi
- Simran Mangeshkar as Golu Khan
- Aayush Bhansali as Lotus
- Dolly Ahluwalia as Preeto, Gulshan's mother and Sunita's mother-in-law
- Gurpal Singh as Kartar Paaji
- Brijendra Kala as Daulat ji
- Deepraj Rana as Paswan Ji
- Jagbir Rathee as Karim's Boss
- Sham Mashalkar as Rustom
- Karim Hajee as Ashok Gupta
- Tarana Raja as Judge Anupama
- Ankita Sahigal as Surinder's Wife
- Zeenat Hussain
- Nikhat Khan as Hargovind's mother

== Production ==
The original Spanish film Champions (2018) was inspired by the Aderes basketball team in Burjassot (in the province of Valencia), created for people with intellectual disabilities, that won twelve Spanish championships between 1999 and 2014; and the true story of American basketball coach Ron Jones. In the 1980s, Jones was convicted for driving under the influence of alcohol and was sentenced to perform community service as the head coach of a basketball team for the intellectually disabled. Jones later published the story as B-Ball: the Team that Never Lost a Game (1990), which was adapted into the TV film One Special Victory by Stuart Cooper in 1991.

Director R. S. Prasanna felt that Aamir Khan was the right pick for the role of the basketball coach due to his humaneness. In October 2023, It was announced that Genelia Deshmukh would star alongside Aamir Khan in Sitaare Zameen Par, which also marks their first collaboration as actors together; she had earlier appeared in Khan's production of the 2008 hit Jaane Tu...Ya Jaane Na, which marked his nephew Imran Khan's debut. Principal photography commenced in February 2024. The filming took place in Mumbai, followed by New Delhi before moving on to Vadodara. Filming wrapped in June 2024.

== Music ==
Distributed and released by Zee Music Company, the soundtrack to Sitaare Zameen Par is composed by Shankar–Ehsaan–Loy, who had also composed the music for Taare Zameen Par, with lyrics written by Amitabh Bhattacharya, replacing Prasoon Joshi. The background score, however, was composed by AKP regular Ram Sampath. The first single, "Good for Nothing" was released on 22 May 2025. The second single, "Sar Aankhon Pe Mere" was released on 29 May 2025.

== Release ==
=== Theatrical ===
On 5 May 2025, the makers announced the film would release on 20 June 2025, along with dubbed versions in Tamil and Telugu. Khan later announced that the film would release exclusively in cinemas and not on any streaming services, a move welcomed by the Multiplex Association of India.

Khan also refused to make two cuts to the film suggested by the Central Board of Film Certification. It was eventually cleared with a UA13+ rating after five changes were made, including the addition of a quote by Prime Minister Narendra Modi in the opening disclaimer. It also became the first film to feature and integrate all major accessibility features including closed captions, audio description and Indian sign language simultaneously.

=== Home media ===
After the end of its theatrical run, Khan held a press conference where he announced that the film will be skipping an OTT release and will instead premiere directly on YouTube from 1 August 2025, for ₹100 in India. It was also made available to watch in the USA, Canada, UK, Australia, Germany, Indonesia, Philippines, Singapore, and Spain, with localized pricing for each market. Khan eventually apologized for lying about the digital release, which drew mixed responses. Later, it was reported that the film would also stream on SonyLIV after its initial pay-per-view release on YouTube.

== Reception ==
=== Critical reception ===
Sitaare Zameen Par opened to positive reviews from critics. On the review aggregator website Rotten Tomatoes, 63% of 19 critics' reviews are positive, with an average rating of 6.7/10.

Saibal Chatterjee of NDTV gave the film 3.5 stars out of 5 and said that "Aamir Khan effortlessly slips into the character of a temperamental man who is often mocked for his short stature." Shubhra Gupta of The Indian Express also gave it 3.5 stars out of 5 and said that "This film wouldn't have worked as well as it does if Aamir hadn't been fully committed to putting himself out there as a hero-who-is-a-jerk." Bollywood Hungama also gave the film 3.5 stars out of 5, praising the story, direction and performances, and noting that the film educated viewers about the characteristics of neurodivergent people. In another 3.5 star out of 5 review, Dhaval Roy from Times of India also praised the performances and labelled the film a wholesome, feel-good watch.

Rahul Desai of The Hollywood Reporter India observed that "R.S. Prasanna and Aamir Khan’s remake of a Spanish sports dramedy is too preachy to be a classic underdog story." Shilajit Mitra of The Hindu writes in his review that "An ideal Aamir Khan film can be both entertaining and edifying. Despite its good intentions, ‘Sitaare Zameen Par’ is just annoying." Mayur Sanap of Rediff.com gave 2 stars out of 5 and said that "There was more to this feel-good exercise that never reaches the dramatic heights it is aiming for."

Devesh Sharma of Filmfare gave 4 stars out of 5 and said that "This is a film that teaches while it entertains, without ever being preachy. It holds up a mirror to society and nudges us to be kinder, gentler, and more accepting. And for that alone, it deserves to be seen, celebrated, and remembered". Deepa Gahlot writing for Scroll.in observed that "The film is well-intentioned, often heart-warming, but also simplistic. Divy Nidhi Sharma’s script is has [sic] some pithy lines but it also prevents the story from conveying its own points. The message is repeated over and over again and then some." Subhash K Jha of News 24 gave 3.5 stars and said that "Sitaare Zameen Par to remind us that cinema in Hindi with a heart and balls, is not dead. Far from it. Aamir Khan’s constantly hungover look goes a long way in sharpening the compassionate clause in the storytelling. His monologue at the end when he sums up what he has learnt about normalcy and life from his team, is profoundly moving. Those are not fake tears. This is not a film about glycerine goals."

Rishabh Suri of Hindustan Times gave 3.5 stars out of 5 and said that "Aamir Khan's film is a heartfelt product, meant to be experienced in a theatre. The laughter, sniffles enhance the impact." Rajiv Vijayakar of Deccan Herald observed that "'Sitaare Zameen Par' is an outstanding confection of feel-good entertainment, mainstream cinema conventions, a novel theme and social messages." Titas Chowdhury of News 18 said that "Aamir Khan’s Sitaare Zameen Par is a heartwarming film on neurodivergence, but despite its noble intent, it falters with a stretched second half."

Lachmi Deb Roy of Firstpost writes in her review that "Aamir Khan’s ‘Sitaare Zameen Par’ will truly make you think. But it will not move you the way Taare Zameen Par did so many years back. Having said that, Sitaare Zameen Par is notable for being the contemporary, mainstream Bollywood film in recent years to touch upon disability." Aishwarya Vasudevan of OTT Play rated 3/5 stars and said that "In Sitaare Zameen Par, Aamir Khan ditches the halo and dons humility, letting the real stars—his neurodivergent team—shine brightest. It’s less about Taare Zameen Par déjà vu and more about a man-child’s cosmic crash course in empathy." Amit Bhatia of ABP News writes that "Sitaare Zameen Par will make you laugh, move you to tears, and leave you with a lesson you’ll carry for life. It’s a true feel-good watch that reaffirms why Aamir Khan is a master storyteller."

=== Box office ===
The film earned over ₹19.50 crore on its opening day, including ₹6.75 crore from international markets. During its opening weekend, it grossed between ₹95–96 crore. It crossed the ₹100 crore mark worldwide within four days. By the end of its first week, the total worldwide earnings stood at over ₹143.50 crore.

In its second weekend, the film collected between ₹200 crore. It reached ₹207 crore in thirteen days and ₹217.50 crore by the fifteenth day. By the end of its third weekend, the total collection rose to ₹224 crore. The film crossed ₹250 crore mark by fourth weekend with collection of ₹254 crore.
