= Ponnar Shankar =

2011 film by Thiagarajan

- Film poster
- Directed by: Thiagarajan
- Written by: M. Karunanidhi
- Based on: Ponnar Shankar by M. Karunanidhi
- Produced by: Thiagarajan
- Starring: Prashanth
- Cinematography: Shaji Kumar
- Edited by: Don Max
- Music by: Ilaiyaraaja
- Production company: Lakshmi Shanthi Movies
- Distributed by: Lakshmi Shanthi Movies
- Release date: 9 April 2011
- Running time: 129 minutes
- Country: India
- Language: Tamil

Ponnar Shankar, also known as Kalaignarin Ponnar-Shankar, is a 2011 Indian Tamil-language historical action drama film produced and directed by Thiagarajan. It is a fictionalised account of the Ponnar Shankar epic, adapted from M. Karunanidhi's novel of the same name. It stars Thiagarajan's son Prashanth in lead dual roles as the titular warrior princes, with Jayaram featuring in an important role alongside debutantes Pooja Chopra and Divya Parameshwaran, and Prakash Raj as the main antagonist. The film also features an extensive cast of supporting actors with Prabhu, Khushbu Sundar, Sneha, Vijayakumar, Nassar, Rajkiran, Napoleon, and Ponvannan, amongst others.

Filming, although significantly delayed, began in August 2009 at Valluvar Kottam in Chennai, where an ancient township film set with temples, forts, a lake and palaces had been built. The film's producers encountered difficulties in making prompt payments to its crew that consisted of more than 1000 members during the filming in the forests of Pollachi. The filming then shifted to Guindy National Park in Chennai, with the battle sequences shot in Kerala and Karnataka. The background score and soundtrack of the film was composed by Ilaiyaraaja, with cinematography handled by Shaji Kumar and editing done by Don Max.

Prior to its release, Ponnar Shankar drew criticism from the Kongunadu Munnetra Kazhagam with an unsuccessful petition filed at Madras High Court seeking a ban on the film, claiming that it portrayed the traditional deities of the gounder community in a bad light. The film was released on 9 April 2011 to a mixed response from critics. Although praised for its cinematography and art direction, it was criticised for having a weak plot and character deficiencies.

== Plot ==
A love affair between Thamarai Nachiyar and her maternal cousin Nellian Kodan is poorly received by their family, especially since he is not financially well off. Thamarai's father, King Periyamalai Kozhundhu Gounder, arranges for her marriage to Mandhiyappan, the ruler of a neighbouring country. Thamarai rejects the arranged marriage, angering Mandhiyappan. She later marries her lover, who had come to see her marry Mandhiyappan, and challenges her brother Chinnamalai Kozhundhu to marry his daughters off to her sons (the marriage of cousins is a gounder custom). Periyamalai Kozhundhu disowns his daughter for choosing Nellaiyankondan and banishes them from his kingdom.

Many years later, Mayavar, a chieftain of a village in Periyamalai Kozhundhu's kingdom, encounters twin brothers Ponnar and Shankar, who are being tutored in martial arts by Rakki Annan. Ponnar and Shankar are valorous and compassionate to the sufferings of the poor. One day, the twins save two sisters, Muthaayi and Pavalaayi, from death. The girls are later revealed to be daughters of Chinnamalai Kozhundhu. Impressed with Ponnar and Shankar's valour, Chinnamalai Kozhundhu agrees to marry his daughters off to them.

A flashback reveals that Ponnar and Sankar are actually Thamarai's sons and that Rakki, who was then a servant of Nellian Kondan, had saved the twins as small children from Mandhiyappan. Mandhiyappan had attempted to avenge himself on Thamarai for rejecting his hand in marriage. He learns that the twins are still alive and hatches a conspiracy to kill them. He tricks Kali Mannan and Periyamalai Kozhundhu into helping him. This leads to an intense battle which ends with good prevailing over evil.

== Cast ==
- Prashanth as Ponnar and Shankar, the twin brothers from Kongu Nadu
- Jayaram as Nellian kodan/ Massamy, Ponnar and Shankar's Father
- Divya Parameshwaran as Muthaayi, Ponnar's love interest
- Prakash Raj as Manthiappan, the rival king who schemes to bring down Ponnar and Shankar
- Prabhu as the Chola King, an ally to Ponnar and Shankar
- Pooja Chopra as Pavalaayi, Shankar's love interest
- Khushbu Sundar as Thamarai Nachiyar, Ponnar and Shankar's mother
- Sneha as Arukkaani Thangam, Ponnar and Shankar's sister
- Vijayakumar as King Periyamalai Kozhundu, Thamarai's father
- Nassar as Mayavar, village chieftain in Periyamalai Kozhundhu's kingdom
- Rajkiran as Raaki Annan, Nellian's servant
- Napoleon as King of Kongu Nadu Thalaiyoor Kaali, an ally to Mandhiyappan
- Ponvannan as Chinnamalai Kozhundu, Thamarai's brother
- Riyaz Khan as Vaiyamperumal, Chinnamalai's son
- Lakshmi Ramakrishnan as Silambayi, Chinnamalai's wife
- Sukumari as Vaanayi, an old lady
- Seetha as Azhagu Nachiyar
- Captain Raju as Chellatha Gounder, Manthiappan's father
- Ponnambalam as Thalapathi
- Bose Venkat as Veerannan
- Bharat Dabholkar as Thirumalai
- Raj Kapoor as King's Minister
- Delhi Ganesh
- Santhana Bharathi
- Shanmugarajan
- Mahanadi Shankar
- Besant Ravi
- Bharathi Kannan
- Geetha Babu
- Bhanu in a special appearance

== Production ==
=== Development ===
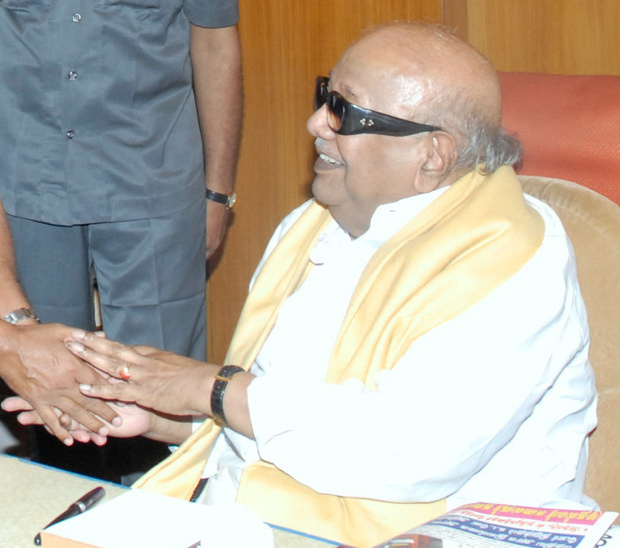
M. Karunanidhi

In early 2007, Thiagarajan approached M. Karunanidhi with the intention of making a film on his adaptation of the Ponnar Shankar epic that he had written in the late 1970s. The latter accepted Thiagarajan's offer and approved of his decision to cast his son, Prashanth, in the dual lead roles. In July 2008, the project was officially announced in a press meet. The film subsequently began pre-production, with Thyagarajan opting to produce the film under his Sri Lakshmi Shanthi Films banner. The preliminary stages of the production took more than a year, with story-boarding, costume designs and colossal set designs all being finalized. Prashanth revealed that extensive research about the time period alone took a year and a half. Prashanth grew his hair out for his role in the film.

At the launch of the film in July 2009, Thiagarajan announced that 36 prominent actors would play lead roles with a hundred others in supporting roles. The invitation cards for the launch had 3D holographic designs which won the Sappi awards of the year 2009. Aishwarya Rai and Deepika Padukone were initially considered for the female lead roles, before Miss India 2009 Pooja Chopra and Divya Parameshwaran accepted the roles. The producers initially listed Sathyaraj in its cast, later replaced by Prabhu. Approximately 5000 junior artists and 1000 artists from the annual Chennai Sangamam had reportedly taken part in the film. Muthuraj was selected as the art director and Shaji Kumar as cinematographer while Prashanth took care of visual effects.

The film ran into production trouble in mid 2010 and was close to being shelved, with sources reporting that Thiagarajan sold the film to Santiago Martin to revive the project. The reports proved to be untrue, and Thiagarajan maintained that he was still the producer of the film. The film had also begun to surpass its budget, due to the casual nature of shooting and difficulties in creating historical sets.

=== Filming ===
Filming commenced on 12 July 2009 at Valluvar Kottam in Chennai, where an entire ancient township film set with temples, forts, a lake and palaces was created. Scenes containing actor and politician Napoleon as the historical figure Thalaiyoor Kaali were shot there first. Prashanth revealed that portraying a dual role meant that he had to change his costumes up to forty times a day to portray the twin brothers' differences correctly. In March 2010, Sneha was roped in to play Arukaani, sister of the warrior twins, and her scenes were filmed.

The climax scenes of the film were shot in the deserts of Rajasthan in February 2011. The final phase of filming was going on in the forests of Pollachi with elephants and horses resembling the region in the 1500s, when the production team couldn't make prompt payments to the onsite crew that consisted of more than 1000 members. The displeasure shown by the crew threatened to disrupt filming. Karunanidhi visited the sets of the film in a Vadapalani studio in February 2011 to peruse over the scenes that had been shot at the time, and filming then moved on to Guindy National Park in Chennai.

The four battle sequences in the film were shot in Perambalur, near Trichy and Warangal in Andhra Pradesh. The scene in Trichy took 28 days to complete, with 30,000 junior artists used as soldiers along with 3000 horses. Another battle scene was shot underwater. A few scenes in the film were reshot after the criticism it received at its premiere that Prashanth's characters showed no emotions at the death of their parents.

== Historical background ==
Ponnar and Shankar, believed to be Chera chieftains, were rulers of the Ponni valanadu (now in the Tiruchirappalli area), in medieval Tamil Nadu. They were said to be in good terms with the Madurai ruler, Vijaya Renga Chokkanathar (1706 - 1732 A. D), who was their contemporary. The legendary folk tale of these brothers, also known as Annamar Swamigal, has been passed down through many generations by means of village songs (known as Gramiya Padalgal) and traditional street theatre, known as Therukkoothu. Absence of reliable written historical records makes it difficult to ascertain the credibility of any of the above claims, along with the widely held legend which was popularised by M Karunanidhi's novel on the subject. According to the legend, the brothers were born to Periyakaralanaka Mannudaiyak Gounden and Thamaraiyal of Manamadurai, belonging to the Chola Urali Gounder community. They had attained the kingdom with help from the then king of Urayur, which was the capital of early Cholas. Thalaiyur Kali, a neighbouring country king belonging to the rival Vettuva Gounder caste, hatched a conspiracy against the brothers which led to a war and the subsequent death of Shankar who was tricked into proving his innocence by falling over a sword. Grieving the loss of his brother, Ponnar entered the battlefield, killing Kali Mannan, before proceeding to kill himself. The brothers were then brought to life by their sister Arukaani with help from the Goddess Periyakandiamman. The brothers, however, were told by the Gods that their earthly duties were over which led to their leaving the mortal world. Arukaani followed suit by throwing herself along with her royal ornaments into a well in Valanadu, a village in Trichy.

A temple was later erected in the spot (which falls in the present day Veerappur) where Shankar died, with Periyakandiamman as the presiding deity. There is also a belief that the well in Sadayandi Thoppu, near Veerappur, in which Arukaani drowned herself, still has her gold ornaments. This story has been the subject of poems, songs and a Tamil historical novel by Karunanidhi. Karunanidhi's novel drew inspiration from a 1971 work written by Kavignar Sakthikanal, who had researched and documented the references to Ponnar and Shankar in the ancient palm leaves he came across at Manapparai. Today the brothers are worshipped as tutelar deities by people belonging to Kongu Vellalar community as a tribute to the brave way the brothers defended their kingdom.

== Soundtrack ==
The soundtrack for the film was composed by Ilaiyaraaja, and consisted of six tracks with lyrics written by Vaali, Na. Muthukumar, Snehan, Palani Bharathi and Ilaiyaraaja. The album was released on 7 March 2011 at the Prasad Studios in Chennai with Karunanidhi presiding over the event.

== Release ==
The film began its publicity campaign in February 2011 with the goal of releasing the film during the period of the 2011 Tamil Nadu Legislative Assembly elections to raise support of the Dravida Munnetra Kazhagam (DMK) Party, led by the film's writer, M. Karunanidhi. Criticism mounted against Karunanidhi for being more involved in his artistic pursuits than in his Chief Ministerial duties as the elections approached. Prior to release, the film also drew criticism from the Kongu Nadu Munnetra Kazhagam (KMK) Party claiming that the film portrayed the traditional deities of the gounder community in a bad light, showing them dancing with semi-nude women. Leading figures from the party wrote to the Central Board of Film Certification (CBFC) to ban the film, holding the promotional material used for the movie as evidence. When they received no response from CBFC, a petition was filed at Madras High Court, seeking its ban under Article 226 of the Indian constitution. The petition was dismissed, given that Article 226 can only be used by a court on a body that falls within its jurisdiction.

The film was released on 9 April 2011, four days before the election. It received a lukewarm response at the box office, opening at 14 theatres in Chennai where it collected ₹1,430,349 (US$15,000) in the first three days.

== Reception ==
The film received a mixed reception from critics. The film was praised for its technical merit and art direction, Shaji Kumar's cinematography, Ilayaraja's re-recording, crisp editing and predominantly colloquial dialogues (unusual for Karunanidhi's films), but criticised for its weak storyline and continuity problems. The Times of India praised the "terrific" art direction and Shaji Kumar's cinematography but stated that there were far "too many gaps in the story to ensure that the movie never rises above its mediocrity and ends up being an epic disappointment", giving it two-and-a-half out of five stars. Thinakaran and Nakkheeeran compared the grandeur of the film to that of S. Shankar, noted for making high budget films in Tamil. Eelam Press gave it a positive review, lauding on all aspects of the film, particularly the film's war scenes, highlighting that by using contemporary Tamil, instead of its ancient counterpart in its dialogues, the audience could better relate to it.

Malathi Rangarajan's review (The Hindu) was fair, labelling the film an "alluring canvas", praising the opulent sets, locations, rich costumes and imposing cast, yet noted that it was "too short to negate the many loopholes". Divya Parameshwaran was appreciated in her debut role, while Pooja Chopra was credited as being "attractive too, but [her] expressions needed some honing". Though Prashanth's stunt acts were appreciated, Rangarajan noted his character flaws, such as minimal expressions which were "barely a smirk" in the initial scenes, and the distinct lack of distinguishable traits between the twin characters he depicted. He also highlighted the lack of logic in Periyamalai Gounder's (Vijayakumar) animosity towards his daughter Thamarai (Khushbu) and the cheerful appearance of Thamarai when she must have been sad and heartbroken in the wedding scene with Prakashraj. Ananda Vikatan stated that the only good aspects of the movie were its expensive sets and its avoidance of boring archaic Tamil dialogues, common in other period films in Tamil, giving it a rating of 41 points out of 100.

== Historical inaccuracies ==
Rediff declared that "there is nothing even remotely historical about the movie". It added that though the film is said to be based on Karunanidhi's novel, the film's commercialised look, along with "half clad women prancing around", made it resemble Ashutosh Gowariker's 2008 film Jodhaa Akbar. It went on that "historical accuracy had been thrown to the winds" and that there were no references to actual places, kings or time periods. The Times of India noted the historical inconsistencies, such as the presence of a British constructed dam in a scene while the film is set in pre-colonial period, "wire stunts of Prashanth in action sequences", revealing costumes donned by the lead actresses and also the bamboo dance sequence in the film which is actually native to Nagaland. It summed that the film lacks attention to detail which is a necessary feature of historical films. The New Indian Express called it a "pseudo historical".

Kavignar Sakthikanal, whose 1971 work was the basis for Karunanidhi's novel, observed that the inaccuracies originated from the novel itself due its usage of literary devices like exaggeration. He further stated that Ponnar and Shankar remained celibate throughout their lives while in the movie they were shown romancing with immodestly dressed women. They married only to avenge the ill treatment meted out to their mother and promptly sent their newly wed wives to prison denying coital relations with them, he added. Also, in the film the title characters were not shown committing suicide as in Sakthikanal and Karunanidhi's version, but rather were depicted emerging victorious from the war unscathed.
