= Mad Company =

- Genre: Comedy; Drama
- Written by: Vignesh Vijaykumar
- Directed by: Vignesh Vijaykumar
- Creative director: Balaji Mohan
- Starring: Prasanna; Kaniha
- Composer: Bharath Sankar
- Country of origin: India
- Original language: Tamil
- No. of seasons: 1
- No. of episodes: 8

Production
- Executive producers: Victor Prabaharan M & Guru Prasad N
- Producer: Raja Ramamurthy
- Cinematography: Shiva GRN
- Editor: Julian Savarimuthu
- Running time: 25-30 minutes
- Production companies: Trendloud; Open Window Production

Original release
- Network: Aha
- Release: 30 September 2022

Mad Company is an Indian Tamil-language comedy-drama web series written and directed by Vignesh Vijaykumar.The eight-episode series starring Prasanna, Kaniha, Dhanya Balakrishna and S.P. Charan was produced by Raja Ramamurthy and premiered on Aha on 30 September 2022.

== Synopsis ==
AK, a passionate actor and celebrated movie star, faces a major setback when he is banned from acting in films. Determined to find new purpose, he establishes Mad Company, an organization that offers emotional support services to people in need. His initiative gains attention but also draws the ire of Amaran, his longtime rival and the influential owner of a news channel. Driven by personal vendetta, Amaran directs his team to focus entirely on discrediting Mad Company and destroying its reputation. The story follows AK's struggle to protect his new venture against Amaran's relentless efforts to bring him down.

== Cast ==
- Prasanna as AK
- Kaniha as Podhum Ponnu
- Dhanya Balakrishna as Roshini
- S.P. Charan as Amaran
- Bommu Lakshmi as Malika
- Naveen George Thomas as Mustafa
- Subbu Panchu as a client in the restaurant (Cameo)
- Daffe Naveen as Joshua

== Reception ==
Mad Company received mostly mixed reviews. Harini SV of Film Companion wrote "Dhanya Balakrishna, Kaniha and SPB Charan make up quite an impressive cast, but it is Prasanna who does most of the heavy lifting with his charm." A critic from OTTplay gave a rating of 3.5 out of 5 and added that "Many of the scenarios come across as a tad predictable, but nevertheless are a fun ride."

== Episodes ==
No.	Title	Directed by	Written by	Original release date
1	"The Mad Company"	Vignesh Vijaykumar	Vignesh Vijaykumar	30 September 2022
Podhum Ponnu introduces MAD Company to the public at a press conference. The press who are not impressed with the concept at first gets furious when they find out that the star AK has not turned up yet. AK silences everyone with his charm and explains how and why he formed MAD Company.
2	"Policekaaran Magal"	Vignesh Vijaykumar	Vignesh Vijaykumar	30 September 2022
Lingam, an ex-police officer, hires Roshini and Mustafa from MAD Company to act as his eloped daughter and her husband. The MAD Company is being received well by the crowd, meanwhile Amaran the owner of AKHIL TV starts his evil plot against the MAD Company to shatter the image of the company.
3	"Engal Anna"	Vignesh Vijaykumar	Vignesh Vijaykumar	30 September 2022
Sanjeevan is hired by Hajiyar’s family to act as their son Kabir, but Hajiyar’s daughter Zubaidha is not pleased with this plan. He tries his best to gain the trust of Zubaidha. Amaran’s assistant Aparna reveals the bad blood between AK and Amaran.
4	"Pei"	Vignesh Vijaykumar	Vignesh Vijaykumar	30 September 2022
Sunil decides to challenge the MAD Company with an interesting and intriguing bet. He wants to hire a ghost to scare him. The request is promptly turned down by the team, but AK wants to take up the challenge.
5	"Mallika"	Vignesh Vijaykumar	Vignesh Vijaykumar	30 September 2022
Mithra finds out the secret about Roshini who in turn reveals AK’s love story. She explains how AK stopped believing in emotions because of his tragic past. Amaran schedules an interview with Bala Shanmugam to blow a hole in MAD Company’s reputation.
6	"Kadhal"	Vignesh Vijaykumar	Vignesh Vijaykumar	30 September 2022
Urmila, Aditya’s ex-lover hires Aditya to act as her boyfriend for a day. She says she is about to be married and wants to relive her best romantic days with Aditya. They both declare that they do not have any feelings for each other, but by the end of the day where will it lead to?
7	"Adi Thadi Mutham"	Vignesh Vijaykumar	Vignesh Vijaykumar	30 September 2022
A request for a grandmother comes to Mad company. As no one fits the profile Podhum Ponnu decides to send the maid of the office Kasthuri Paati to the client. Amaran thinks to use this opportunity against Mad company and comes up with an evil plot. Meanwhile, Mithra decides to find Mallika and know the real reason for her breakup with AK and finds a shocking truth while at the office Roshini proposes AK.
8	"Lust"	Vignesh Vijaykumar	Vignesh Vijaykumar	30 September 2022
AK is seen as a drug addict traveling along with another young drug addict (Joshua) in a police van. In a turn of events, we witness AK risking his life for his passion for acting. AK tries to learn about the mystery of his past life and that one crucial truth about Mayilon.
