= Sneha (actress) =

Indian actress (born 1981)

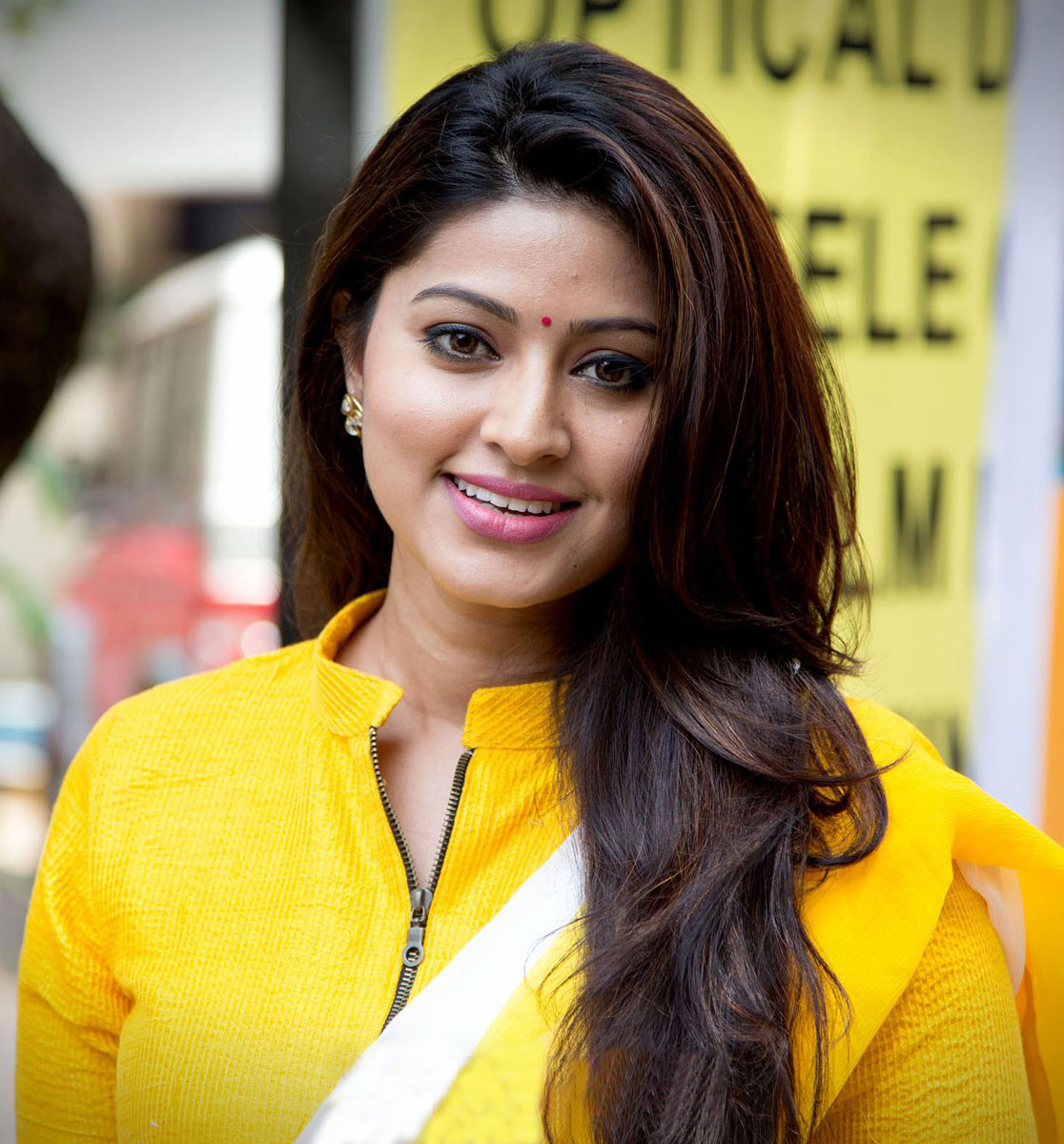
- Sneha in 2014
- Born: Suhasini Rajaram Naidu; 12 October 1981 (age 45); Bombay, Maharashtra, India
- Occupation: Actress
- Years active: 2000–present
- Spouse: Prasanna (m. 2012)
- Children: 2
- Honours: Kalaimamani (2004)

Suhasini Rajaram Naidu (born 12 October 1981), known professionally as Sneha, is an Indian actress who works primarily in Tamil, Telugu and Malayalam films, having appeared in both lead and supporting roles. Sneha is a recipient of several accolades including two Tamil Nadu State Film Awards and one Filmfare Award.

== Early life ==
Sneha was born as Suhasini Rajaram Naidu on 12 October 1981 into a Telugu family originally from Andhra Pradesh. Her grandparents had relocated to Mumbai, where she was born, and her family later moved to Sharjah, UAE, where she grew up. While pursuing her class 12, she was discovered by a Malayalam producer at a cricket match in Sharjah, which led to her acting debut.

== Career ==
=== 2000–2004 ===
Fazil Nazeem recommended Sneha to Anil-Babu, who was searching for a heroine for his romantic film Ingane Oru Nilapakshi (2000). The film featured Sneha as an aspiring dancer, with the actress performing for seven classical songs. She was signed by Susi Ganeshan for his directorial debut Virumbukiren in 2000, which, however, was long delayed, and Ennavalle, opposite Madhavan, became her first Tamil release. She started the year 2001 with a foray into Telugu cinema, with an appearance in Priyamaina Neeku, followed by N. Linguswamy's family drama Aanandham. She was then seen in K. Balachandar's Parthale Paravasam and the Telugu film Tholi Valapu, which went unnoticed. M. Raja's Hanuman Junction became a major success.

She was a part of eight films that were released in 2002. The films that year included Punnagai Desam, the Vasanth's Yai! Nee Romba Azhaga Irukey!, Unnai Ninaithu and April Madhathil. The film failed at the box office while critics and audience raved at the music of the film. Her performance in Unnai Ninaithu led to her being awarded the first Filmfare Award for Best Supporting Actress. She also won other awards for her performance. Subsequently, she acted in a lead role in King and a supporting role in Pammal K. Sambandam with Kamal Haasan and Abbas, respectively. Virumbukiren that featured Sneha as a rustic village belle, eventually released in December 2002 and went on to win the Tamil Nadu State Film Award for Best Actress.

Sneha appeared in two Tamil films in 2003, Vaseegara with Vijay and Parthiban Kanavu with Srikanth. She received high praise for her performance in Parthiban Kanavu, with The Hindu writing: "Till date this is the best role that has come Sneha's way and the charming actress has utilised the opportunity well. With make-up or without it, Sneha sparkles". 2004 was a mixed year for the actress, with Jana, Bose and Adhu all failing at the box office. However, Vasool Raja MBBS, opposite Kamal Haasan, and Autograph were successes.

=== 2005–2008 ===
The years 2005 and 2006 saw her acting in Telugu films such as Sankranthi with Venkatesh, Radha Gopalam with Srikanth, Sri Ramadasu with Nagarjuna, and a Malayalam film, Thuruppu Gulan with Mammootty was a success, while others released in the respective years turning out as average grosser at the box office. She played a supporting role in Selvaraghavan's experimental film Pudhupettai, starring Dhanush.

In the year 2006, she made her debut into Kannada film industry through Ravi Shastri, which received negative reviews.

In 2007, Sneha starred in Naan Avanillai, Madhumasam, Maharadhi and Tamil film Pallikoodam, which received positive reviews.

Pirivom Santhippom, which saw her collaborating with Karu Pazhaniappan again, was her first film in 2008. Co-starring Cheran. She tried highly glamorous roles with Pandi and Inba, both turning out to be average grossers. She paired with Silambarasan in Silambattam.

=== 2009–2012 ===
The thriller films Achchamundu Achchamundu, co-starring Prasanna and Hollywood actor John Shea, and Amaravathi, were her only releases of 2009 in Tamil and Telugu, respectively. Both films won many plaudits for dealing with bold themes of pedophiles and womb stealing, respectively. The former film won many awards internationally.

In 2010, she starred in Venkat Prabhu's Goa. She again forayed into a glamorous, ultra-modern chick role with a few shades of grey. She also appeared in three Malayalam films. She acted in Pramani with Mammootty and paired up with Mohanlal for the first time in Shikkar, The Hunt, which was a huge success and considered as a milestone in Mohanlal's history. Her last release of 2011 was Vandae Maatharam. Starring opposite Mammootty again.

In 2011, she was first seen as a tough police officer in Bhavani, which opened to mixed reviews and bombed at the box office, although Sneha received praise for her performance. Ponnar Shankar, a period film penned by M. Karunanidhi, where she appeared as a warrior-princess, opened to mixed reviews and didn't do well at the box office. Rajanna, a period film based on Telangana issue opposite Nagarjuna for the second time, released on 22 December 2012 to positive reviews.

In 2012, her long canned movie, Murattu Kaalai, with Sundar C was released on 15 June 2012 to mixed reviews, being her first movie post-marriage.

=== 2013–present ===
In 2013, she acted in a critically acclaimed movie Haridas. Her next release was a trilingual made in Kannada, Tamil and Telugu – Un Samayal Arayil (2014), the official remake of the Malayalam blockbuster Salt N' Pepper, where she starred opposite Prakash Raj and a bunch of debutantes. The Kannada version was successful, while the other two versions was unsuccessful. Sneha later hosted a Tamil reality television show Melam Kottu Thali Kattu, the show was aired for 2 seasons.

In 2015, Sneha appeared in the Telugu film S/O Satyamurthy, starred in The Great Father (2017), starred in Velaikkaran. She was also the judge of the Tamil reality TV show, Dance Jodi Dance, alongside Radhika. She later starred in the Telugu film Vinaya Vidheya Rama (2019) and Pattas (2020).

In 2023, She appeared with Mammootty in Christopher, her fifth film with the actor and second with director B. Unnikrishnan. She acted in the lead role of the Tamil children's film, Shot Boot Three directed by Arun Vaidyanathan. Then, Vijay and Sneha, who were last seen together in 2003 release Vaseegara directed by K. Selva Bharathy, were paired up after 22 years in Venkat Prabhu's The Greatest of All Time (2024).

=== Other assignments ===
She has appeared in many commercials including Saravana Stores, Horlicks, Aashirvaad, Idhayam Dots.

== Personal life ==
Sneha was paired with Prasanna for the first time in Achchamundu! Achchamundu! (2009). Since then, there were numerous reports in the media on their relationship. Prasanna was spotted in all her modeling shows and both were spotted together in movie previews. Though both denied it as a rumour, later, on 9 November 2011, Prasanna announced, "Yes... Sneha and I decided to marry soon with the blessings of our parents." They married on 11 May 2012 in Chennai. The couple have two children, a daughter and a son, and reside in Chennai.

== Filmography ==
Key
†	Denotes films that have not yet been released

=== Films ===
List of Sneha film credits
Year	Title	Role	Language	Notes	Ref.
2000	Ingane Oru Nilapakshi	Manasi	Malayalam	Credited as Manasi	
2000	Ennavalle	Lakshmi	Tamil		
2001	Priyamaina Neeku	Sandhya	Telugu		
2001	Aanandham	Viji	Tamil		
2001	Tholi Valapu	Soumya	Telugu		
2001	Paarthale Paravasam	Chella	Tamil		
2001	Hanuman Junction	Meenkashi	Telugu		
2002	Pammal K. Sambandam	Malathi Anand	Tamil		
2002	Punnagai Desam	Priya	Tamil		
2002	Unnai Ninaithu	Radha	Tamil	Won, Filmfare Award for Best Supporting Actress – Tamil	
2002	Yai! Nee Romba Azhaga Irukey!	Raji	Tamil		
2002	King	Thamizh	Tamil		
2002	April Madhathil	Swetha	Tamil		
2002	Virumbukiren	Thavamani	Tamil	Won, Tamil Nadu State Film Award for Best Actress	
2003	Vaseegara	Priya Vishwanathan	Tamil		
2003	Parthiban Kanavu	Sathya, Janani	Tamil		
2004	Vasool Raja MBBS	Janaki Vishwanathan	Tamil		
2004	Jana	Manimegalai	Tamil		
2004	Bose	Charu	Tamil		
2004	Autograph	Divya	Tamil		
2004	Adhu	Meera	Tamil		
2004	Venky	Sravani	Telugu		
2005	Aayudham	Maha	Tamil		
2005	Sankranthi	Anjali	Telugu		
2005	Radha Gopalam	Radha	Telugu		
2005	Chinna	Gayathri Vikram	Tamil		
2005	ABCD	Chandra	Tamil		
2005	That is Pandu	Anjali	Telugu		
2006	Sri Ramadasu	Kamala	Telugu		
2006	Evandoi Srivaru	Divya	Telugu		
2006	Thuruppu Gulan	Lakshmi	Malayalam		
2006	Pudhupettai	Krishnaveni	Tamil		
2006	Ravi Shastri	Bhanu	Kannada		
2006	Manasu Palike Mouna Raagam	Gowri	Telugu		
2007	Maharadhi	Bhairavi	Telugu		
2007	Madhumasam	Hamsa Vahini	Telugu		
2007	Naan Avanillai	Anjali	Tamil		
2007	Pallikoodam	Kokila Vetrivel	Tamil		
2008	Pirivom Santhippom	Visalakshi Natesan	Tamil	Won, Tamil Nadu State Film Award for Best Actress	
2008	Inba	Priya	Tamil		
2008	Nee Sukhame Ne Koruthunna	Swapna	Telugu		
2008	Pandi	Bhuvana	Tamil		
2008	Pandurangadu	Lakshmi	Telugu		
2008	Kuselan	Herself	Tamil	Cameo in the song "Cinema Cinema"	
2008	Adivishnu	Anjali	Telugu		
2008	Silambattam	Gayathri	Tamil		
2009	Achchamundu! Achchamundu!	Malini Kumar	Tamil		
2009	Amaravathi	Latha Venkat	Telugu		
2010	Goa	Suhasini Fernando	Tamil		
2010	Theeradha Vilaiyattu Pillai	Dr. Ramya	Tamil	Cameo	
2010	Angaadi Theru	Herself	Tamil	Cameo	
2010	Pramaani	Janaki	Malayalam		
2010	Shikkar	Kaveri	Malayalam		
2010	Vandae Maatharam	Nandhini	Malayalam	Bilingual film	
2010	Vandae Maatharam	Nandhini	Tamil	Bilingual film	
2011	Bhavani	ACP A. Bhavani	Tamil		
2011	Ponnar Shankar	Arukkaani	Tamil		
2011	Rajanna	Lachamma	Telugu		
2012	Oru Kal Oru Kannadi	Jennifer	Tamil	Cameo	
2012	Murattu Kaalai	Bhuvana	Tamil		
2013	Haridas	Amudhavalli	Tamil	Nominated, Filmfare Award for Best Actress – Tamil	
2014	Pannaiyarum Padminiyum	Shanmugam's daughter	Tamil	Cameo	
2014	Oggarane	Gowri	Kannada	Trilingual film	
2014	Ulavacharu Biryani	Gowri	Telugu	Trilingual film	
2014	Un Samayal Arayil	Gowri	Tamil	Trilingual film	
2015	S/O Satyamurthy	Lakshmi Devaraj	Telugu		
2015	JK Enum Nanbanin Vaazhkai	Herself	Tamil	Cameo	
2015	Kaaval	Herself	Tamil	Cameo	
2016	Rajadhi Raja	Herself	Telugu	Cameo	
2016	Ore Mukham	Bhama	Malayalam	Cameo	
2017	The Great Father	Michelle David	Malayalam		
2017	Velaikkaran	Kasthuri	Tamil		
2019	Vinaya Vidheya Rama	Konidela Gayatri Devi	Telugu		
2019	Kurukshetra	Draupadi	Kannada		
2020	Pattas	Kanyakumari "Kanya"	Tamil		
2023	Christopher	Beena Mariam Chacko	Malayalam		
2023	Shot Boot Three	Shyamala	Tamil		
2024	The Greatest of All Time	Anuradha	Tamil		
2025	Dragon	Doctor	Tamil	Cameo	
2026	Mookuthi Amman 2	Goddess of Nadunaadu	Tamil	Cameo	

=== Television ===
List of Sneha television credits
Year	Series	Role	Notes	Ref.
2016–present	Dance Jodi Dance	Judge	3 seasons	

== Accolades ==
- 2001: Tamil Nadu State Film Award for Best Actress for Virumbugiren.
- 2002: Filmfare Award for Best Supporting Actress – Tamil for Unnai Ninaithu.
- 2008: Tamil Nadu State Film Award for Best Actress & Vijay Award for Best Actress for Pirivom Santhippom.
