= Divya Parameshwaran =

Indian actress and model (born 1987)

- Born: Divya Parameshwaran; 27 July 1987 (age 38); Chennai, Tamil Nadu
- Occupations: actress, model
- Years active: 2007—2012

Divya Parameshwaran is an Indian actress and model who appeared in a Tamil film and several notable commercials. Beginning her career by appearing in several prominent advertisements, Divya later appeared in the period film, Ponnar Shankar (2011), winning praise for her portrayal of Princess Pavalaayi. In 2012, she moved to the US to pursue an MBA and later pursue a career in marketing. She was the popular face for the Brand "Brooke Bond 3 Roses" TV Commercials during the times of mid 2000's

== Career ==
Divya Parameshwaran was born into Tamil family. She graduated from the Sri Kumaran Children's Home, before undertaking junior college at Sri Bhagawan Mahaveer Jain College in Bangalore. Furthermore, she completed an engineering degree at the B.M.S. College of Engineering, Bangalore in 2008. Divya decided to take up modelling full-time soon after graduation. She walked the ramp for leading designers, and shot for several regional and national brands. She finished first runner up in the beauty pageant Miss India Worldwide 2008, closely after Shagun Sarabhai at the event in Gurgaon. Divya then gained recognition with her advert for the saree brand, Kalamandir, after pictures of her in a saree, had created curiosity about who the model was. Subsequently, in 2010, well known for her numerous advertisements and memorable expressions, she won a national poll revealing that she was India's most recognisable face on television. Ever since, she has endorsed several brands like Dove, Rin and Hamam.

In early 2010, she was selected after an audition to portray the historical figure of Pavalaagi in Thyagarajan's epic drama Ponnar Shankar, portraying the love interest of Ponnar played by Prashanth. The movie was released in April 2011 to positive reviews from critics with Divya being described as to have made "a solid debut" and praised for being "cheerful-looking". Despite reports that she would abandon her career in adverts to prolong her film stint, she refuted the rumour and claimed she was happy to juggle between the professions.

== Filmography ==
| Year | Film | Role | Language | notes |
|---|---|---|---|---|
| 2011 | Ponnar Shankar | Pavalaayi | Tamil | Debut film as lead role. |
