= Achchamundu! Achchamundu! =

- Directed by: Arun Vaidyanathan
- Written by: Arun Vaidyanathan
- Produced by: Arun Vaidyanathan; Asma Hashmi; Ananth Govinda; P. Srinivasan; Ramzan Lakhani
- Starring: Prasanna; John Shea; Sneha; Akshaya Dinesh
- Cinematography: Chris Freilich
- Edited by: N. P. Sathish
- Music by: Karthik Raja
- Release date: 17 July 2009
- Running time: 135 minutes
- Countries: India; United States
- Languages: Tamil; English

Achchamundu! Achchamundu! (titled as I am Scared internationally) is a 2009 Indian-American social thriller directed by Arun Vaidyanathan, starring Prasanna, John Shea and Sneha. It is the first film in Indian cinema to be shot with the Red One camera system. The music was composed by Karthik Raja with cinematography by Chris Freilich. The film was released worldwide on 17 July 2009. The film features dialogues in both Tamil and English.

== Plot ==
Senthil Kumar (Prasanna) and Malini (Sneha) are a happily married couple in New Jersey, living life like any other India-born immigrant couple in the USA. Senthil submerges himself in the office and eats sambar rice at home, and Malini never misses a bhajan at the temple and shops at Indian grocery stores. They have a 10-year-old daughter Rithika (Akshaya Dinesh), the apple of their eye (their car's license plate carries the name of their daughter).

The family has just settled in a new, spacious home about which Malini, understandably, has fears. The couple squabbles amicably about everything from Malini's perpetual laundry and cooking; while Senthil argues with friends about the significance of viboothi and takes his family on weekend trips and birthday parties. It is a normal, happy life in the US until Theodore Robertson (John Shea) arrives, to paint the basement. Now, things are never the same at home again.

Robertson's unusually kind behavior towards children sets off warning bells, especially when he is shown to be a pedophile who exercises like mad within the confines of his home, always moving on towards his next target. How the couple saves their child forms the rest of the story.

== Cast ==
- Prasanna as Senthil Kumar
- John Shea as Theodore Robertson
- Sneha as Malini
- Akshaya Dinesh as Rithika
- Vasanth Santhosham as Ron
- Rick Pisarro as a police officer

== Production ==
The film's title is the negative of the phrase "Achamillai Achamillai" coined by poet Subramania Bharati, and later used as the title of a 1984 film directed by K. Balachander. The film was shot in New Jersey and New York with a cabin shoot happening near West Milford on 30 May 2008. Dheepa Ramanujam worked as an assistant director.

== Themes and influences ==
The film talks about various issues including pedophilia, the dynamics between a married couple, the lives of Indian Americans, and how "men are from Mars, women are from Venus".

== Soundtrack ==
The soundtrack was composed by Karthik Raja.

Song	Singers	Lyrics	Length
"U.S.A U.S.A"	Rahul Nambiar, Anupama, Krish	Palani Bharathi	4.18
"Kannil Dhaagam"	S. Sowmya	Andal Priyadarshini	3.42
"Parvai Vali Sumandhal"	Rahul Nambiar	Andal Priyadarshini	1.25
"Theme Music"	Instrumental	-	3.35

== Release ==
The film was officially selected for screening at the 12th Shanghai International Film Festival (under the International Panorama category), the Digital Cinema Film Festival in Japan and the Cairo International Film Festival.

== Reception ==
Rediff wrote "For the guts in coming up with a unique, important theme that needs to be addressed sensitively, this movie works. A must-watch". The Times of India wrote "The average Indian may shy away from paedophilia, but director Vaidyanathan makes a compelling case to watch this film. Subtlety is the byword here rather than gory, knife-edge moments. The approach makes a deeper impression than a dramatic one could have." A critic from Deccan Herald opined that "Despite its shortcomings, ‘Achamundu Achamundu’ deserves a dekko (watch)". Gauthaman Bhaskaran of The Seoul Times wrote, "Though “Achamundu, Achamundu” shows considerable restraint when it deals with paedophilia and murder, keeping the actual acts off screen, the film ends up compromising on the dramatic element. It remains pretty flat till about the last 15 minutes out of the total 90 minutes or so".

== Awards and nominations ==
Event	Category	Recipient	Result	Ref.
Garden State Film Festival	Best Homegrown Feature Film	Achamundu! Achamundu! (also for Split Ends)	Won	
Tamil Nadu State Film Awards	Best Picture (Third Prize)	Achamundu! Achamundu!	Won	
Tamil Nadu State Film Awards	Special Prize	Prasanna	Won	
Media Guild Awards	Best Film Director	Arun Vaidyanathan	Won	
Chennai International Film Festival	Best Feature Film	Achamundu! Achamundu!	Won	
