= Melam Kottu Thali Kattu =

- Presented by: Sneha
- Original language: Tamil
- No. of seasons: 2
- No. of episodes: 32

Production
- Camera setup: Multi-camera
- Running time: approx. 40-45 minutes per episode

Original release
- Network: Puthuyugam TV
- Release: 2013 – 16 April 2014

Melam Kottu Thali Kattu is an Indian Tamil-language reality television show, broadcast on Puthuyugam TV from 2013 to 16 April 2014 aired every Saturday and Sunday 8 PM IST and Season 2 aired every Saturday 8 PM IST. It is meant for unmarried women. It includes a seven-round quiz competition with prizes such as gold and other articles required for marriage. The show is presented by actress Sneha. It also airs in Malaysia Tamil Channel on Astro Vaanavil.

== Season ==
=== Seasons overview ===
Season	Episodes	Originally aired	
Season	Episodes	First aired	Last aired
1	24	2013	19 January 2014
2	8	8 March 2014	16 April 2014

== International broadcast ==
- In Singapore Tamil Channel on V Thamizh HD. It aired Saturday and Sunday at 9:00PM.
- In Malaysia Tamil Channel on Astro Vaanavil. It airs every Monday at 6:00PM.
