= Kalyana Samayal Saadham =

2013 Indian film by R.S. Prasanna

- Poster
- Directed by: R. S. Prasanna
- Written by: R. S. Prasanna
- Produced by: Arun Vaidyanathan; Ananth Govindan
- Starring: Prasanna; Lekha Washington
- Cinematography: Krishnan Vasant
- Edited by: Sathyaraj Natarajan
- Music by: Arrora
- Production company: Everest Entertainment
- Distributed by: Abi TCS Studios; Thirukumaran Entertainment; RPP Film Factory
- Release date: 7 December 2013
- Country: India
- Language: Tamil

Kalyana Samayal Saadham (transl. Wedding Feast), also known by the initialism KSS, is a 2013 Indian Tamil-language romantic comedy film written and directed by R. S. Prasanna in his directorial debut. It stars Prasanna and Lekha Washington, while Crazy Mohan, Delhi Ganesh, Uma appear in supporting roles. Produced by Ananth Govindan and Arun Vaidyanathan under the Everest Entertainment banner, it was distributed by Abinesh Elangovan's Abi TCS Studios, C. V. Kumar's Thirukumaran Entertainment and RPP Film Factory. The film's title is derived from a legendary song from the 1957 film Mayabazar.

The film follows Raghu, a software engineer who faces several challenges in his arranged marriage as he suffers from erectile dysfunction and tries to find a solution to his problem. Principal photography of the film started on 3 January 2013, and completed within 25 days. The music was composed by Arrora, with cinematography handled by Krishnan Vasant and editing done by Sathyaraj Natarajan.

Kalyana Samayal Saadham, was marketed as a feel-good wedding movie, with some modern twists. The film released worldwide on 7 December 2013, and received critical acclaim. It was listed on "The list of Films, that redefined Tamil cinema" by The Hindu. The film was remade in Hindi, titled as Shubh Mangal Savdhan, directed by Prasanna himself.

== Plot ==
Raghu, a software engineer, gets engaged to another engineer named Meera. It is going to be an arranged marriage, and the extended families of both are looking forward to it. However, Raghu has erectile dysfunction, and on the advice of his friends, tries out various quacks treating impotency. Funny things happen on the way of solving the problem.

== Cast ==
- Prasanna as Raghu Viswanathan
- Lekha Washington as Meera Chandrasekaran
- Geetha Ravishankar as Raghu's mother
- Natarajan (Nat Narayanasamy) as Viswanathan (Raghu's father)
- Uma as Meera's mother
- Delhi Ganesh as Chandrasekaran
- Raaghav as Gautham
- Kathadi Ramamurthy as Raghu's grandfather
- Neelu as Meera's uncle / Card Mama
- Vatsala Rajagopal as Meera's grandmother
- Crazy Mohan as Dr. Kamlesh
- Dr. Sharmila as Raghu's aunt
- Srilekha Parthasarathy as Raghu's aunt
- R. S. Shivaji as Roshan Dhavarasa
- Sreekanth Dass as Dheena
- Praveen Muthurangan as Kabir
- Joel Nigli as Jeff
- Gautham R as Vinay (Meera's Brother)
- Rohit
- Baby Swaksha as Young Meera

== Production ==
=== Development ===
The film marked the directorial debut of R. S. Prasanna, a gold medal winner from the L. V. Prasad Film Institute. The first look released in November 2012, which features the technical crew, Krishnan Vasant handling the cinematography, Sathyaraj Natarajan being the editor, and Vedanth Bharadwaj and singer Karthik, were initially roped into compose the music, later replaced by flautist Navin Iyer, credited as Arrora. Delhi Ganesh and Uma Padmanabhan, joined the film, playing the parents of Lekha Washington, whereas Geetha Ravishankar and Natarajan essayed the role of Prasanna's parents. Crazy Mohan, also joined the film in a supporting role.

=== Filming ===
Principal photography of the movie began on 3 January 2013, with a pooja (blessing) ceremony. Most of the film's shoot schedule was completed within 25 days. The sound mixing of the film took place at the Warner Brothers Studio in Los Angeles, with audiographer Kunal Rajan.

== Music ==
Kalyana Samayal Saadham

Soundtrack album by Arrora
- Released: 16 October 2013
- Recorded: 2013
- Genre: Feature film soundtrack
- Length: 26:22
- Language: Tamil
- Label: Think Music
- Producer: Arun Vaidyanathan

Arrora chronology
Kalyana Samayal Saadham (2013)	Peruchazhi (2014)

Singles from Kalyana Samayal Saadham
- 1. "Mella Sirithai" Released: 9 September 2013

The music for Kalyana Samayal Saadham is composed by flautist Navin, credited as Arrora, who made his debut as a music composer. The soundtrack album features six tracks, with lyrics written by singer Harish Raghavendra, Muthamil, Arrora, Sakthi, Srikanth Varadhan, with the latter making his debut as a lyricist. Actor Prasanna also made his debut as a playback singer for the song "Pallu Pona Raja" which has a female version sung by Sangeetha Rajeshwaran. The audio rights of the film were purchased and marketed by Think Music.

The first single track "Mella Sirithai" sung by Haricharan, Chinmayi was released on 9 September 2013 coinciding with the occasion of Vinayaka Chathurthi, at Suryan FM 93.5 Radio Station in Chennai, in the presence of directors Nalan Kumarasamy, Karthik Subbaraj, Balaji Tharaneetharan, Balaji Mohan, Pa. Ranjith and Alphonse Puthren. The video of the song got positive response for its innovative making. The audio launch of the film took place on 16 October 2013, at Sathyam Cinemas in Chennai, with the presence of K. S. Ravikumar, Balu Mahendra, G. Dhananjayan, K. E. Gnanavel Raja, Nalan Kumarasamy and Santhosh Narayanan, alongside the cast and crew. The audio CD of the film was unveiled by Ravikumar and received it to Balu Mahendra.

The audio album received positive reviews from critics. Behindwoods rated the album 2.75 out of 5 stating, "A marriage of imaginative melodies and ideas. R. S. Prasanna and Navin (Arrora) start on the right track." Indiaglitz rated the album 3 out of 5, stating "A thundering debut by Arrora." Milliblog reviewed it as "Promising composing debut by Arrora." Lakshmansruthi.com gave a verdict stating "The composer has mixed the western hint to the carnatic tune at places and it has come out pretty well." The album was ranked in 25th position in the Top 25 Albums of 2013, by Behindwoods.

Track list
No.	Title	Lyrics	Singer(s)	Length
1.	"Modern Kalyanam"	Harish Raghavendra	Megha, Nikhita Gandhi, Harini	4:36
2.	"Mella Sirithai"	Muthamil, Sakthi	Haricharan, Chinmayi	4:18
3.	"Kalyanam 2.0"	Arrora	Arrora, Keerthana	5:00
4.	"Pallu Pona Raja" (Male)	Srikanth Varadhan	Prasanna	3:41
5.	"Kadhal Marandhaayada"	Arrora, Harish Raghavendra	Arrora, Keerthana	5:04
6.	"Pallu Pona Raja" (Female)	Srikanth Varadhan	Sangeetha Rajeshwaran	3:41
Total length:				26:22

== Release ==
Kalyana Samayal Saadham was initially slated to release on 13 September 2013, later the release was pushed to 29 November 2013, and the film's release was scheduled on 7 December 2013. The film's distribution rights were acquired by C. V. Kumar, under Thirukumaran Entertainment banner, along with Abhinesh Elangovan's Abi TCS Studios.

The film opened in 260 screens across Tamil Nadu on 7 December 2013. It had been received a U/A certificate from the Central Board of Film Certification. Prasanna said this rating was "the elephant in the room when he pitched the story to his producers".

=== Marketing ===
The film's first look poster was released on 24 November 2012. A few making stills were released on 3 January 2013. The teaser of the film was released on 14 April 2013, coinciding with the occasion of Tamil New Year. The teaser received positive response from viewers. The theatrical trailer of the film was released on 16 October 2013, at the film's audio launch event.

As a part of the film's promotion, the makers of Kalyana Samayal Saadham, replaced their Facebook profile pictures, with their wedding photos, including the cast and crew, since the film's theme is based on marriage. The innovative social media campaign of the movie became hugely successful, and has been reported by national media.

== Reception ==
The film received critical acclaim from critics. The Times of India gave 4 stars out of 5 and wrote, "The first 15 minutes play out like a romantic fantasy and director Prasanna deftly changes track, turning it into a comedy about erectile dysfunction. Prasanna treats these segments quite cheekily but never resorts to crassness. And gently (and deftly), he nudges this lighthearted material into serious territory". Rediff gave the film 3 stars out of 5 and wrote, "Kalyana Samayal Saadham is not just about a big fat Indian wedding but also highlights the emotional and sensitive topic of stress-related erectile dysfunction that is becoming an increasingly common problem among the modern youth". Baradwaj Rangan from The Hindu wrote, "It wants to be little more than an innocuous, pleasant, crowd-pleasing entertainer, so you can't fault it for what it isn't — but there's a lingering sense of what-could-have-been". Deccan Herald wrote, "Kalyana Samayal Saadham turns out to be an interesting rom-com providing food for thought. Despite its savoury title, the film is not a big fat wedding fest. But it touches upon a sensitive topic of erectile dysfunction, a modern-day problem among urban youth given the stressful life they lead". The New Indian Express wrote, "To craft an adult comedy with a sensitive theme, with maturity and style, is harder still. But debutant director R S Prasanna has pulled it off with finesse. Kalyana Samayal Sadham entertains even as it takes up an issue that is becoming more prevalent in modern stressful times". Sify wrote, "Kalyana Samayal Saadham is a well-made adult romcom, that keeps you smiling. It is take on a big fat Brahmin wedding and its pitfalls and rituals is great fun". Behindwoods gave 3 stars out of 5 and wrote, "Kalyana Samayal Saadham, is a practical take on a very serious issue but laced with lighthearted approach" and called it "A pleasant feel good urban flick".

== Remakes ==
The film was remade in Hindi as Shubh Mangal Savdhan (2017), directed by Prasanna, who helmed the original version. Ayushmann Khurrana and Bhumi Pednekar, played the lead roles.

== Legacy ==
Sudhish Kamath picked it as one of five films that have redefined Tamil cinema in 2013, writing, "this is a surprisingly subtle and truly modern Tamil romantic comedy by writer-director R.S. Prasanna, which has pushed the boundaries of the unexplored characters and situations further".

Actor Kamal Haasan, who watched the special screening on 2 January 2014, later stated that "I became nervous when the makers told me that I had inspired them. Therefore, I wished for the film to succeed and I'm glad that it has today. The director and the producer of the film ensured that I don't feel nervous anymore."

Kalyana Samayal Saadham, was also featured in the Emmy-nominated American television series Born to Explore with Richard Wiese. A statement from the film's production house said that the movie was covered as part of the series. The show was telecasted in April 2013, and was aired at the ABC TV channel, later telecast on National Geographic Channel worldwide.
