= Cheena Thaana 001 =

- DVD cover
- Directed by: T. P. Gajendran
- Screenplay by: T. P. Gajendran; Uday Krishna; Siby K. Thomas
- Based on: CID Moosa (2003) by Johny Antony
- Produced by: Mid Valley
- Starring: Prasanna; Sheela
- Cinematography: Raja Rajan
- Edited by: N. Ganesh
- Music by: Deva
- Production company: Mid Valley Entertainment
- Release date: 7 September 2007
- Country: India
- Language: Tamil

Cheena Thaana 001 is a 2007 Indian Tamil-language action comedy film directed by T. P. Gajendran. The film stars Prasanna and Sheela, while Vadivelu, Manivannan, Riyaz Khan, Delhi Ganesh, and Kazan Khan play supporting roles. It is a remake of the 2003 Malayalam film C.I.D. Moosa. The music was composed by Deva with cinematography by Raja Rajan and editing by N. Ganesh. The film released on 7 September 2007.

== Plot ==
Tamizharasu wants to become a cop, but the arrogant police officers Inspector Parameshwaran and AC Gowrishankar ensure that he does not succeed. Meanwhile, Tamizharasu discovers a plot to assassinate the Governor by the terrorist Gulshan Baba, and he complains about this to Gowrishankar, but he discovers that he is also a member of the plot. So he forms a detective agency and starts cracking the plot. How he succeeds in it with the help of his father Ezhumalai, his father's friend and with his own friend Cheenichamy, who is also a thief, forms the rest of the story.

== Cast ==
- Prasanna as Tamizharasu
- Sheela as Priya
- Vadivelu as Cheenichamy
- Manivannan as Inspector Parameshwaran, Tamizharasu's brother-law
- Riyaz Khan as ACP Gowri Shankar
- Delhi Ganesh as Head Constable Ezhumalai, Tamizharasu's father
- Ilavarasu as Sub Inspector Dhandapani, Tamizharasu's father's friend
- Nizhalgal Ravi as Vijayaraghavan IPS, the Chennai City Police Commissioner
- Visu as Vishwanath Reddy, former High Court Judge current Governor of Tamil Nadu
- Kazan Khan as Terrorist Leader Gulshan Baba
- Satya Prakash as Terrorist Satya
- Muthukaalai as Omapodi
- Reena as Tamizharasu's mother
- Shanthi Williams as Governor's wife
- T. P. Gajendran as Madman
- Singamuthu
- Bhuvana
- Simran Khan (Item number)
- Vengal Rao
- Livingston as CID Aanthaikannan (Special Appearance)

== Soundtrack ==
The music was composed by Deva.

Song	Singers	Lyrics	Length
Acha Acha	Arjith	Piraisoodan	05:27
Cheena Thana	Tippu	Krithiya	05:01
Poruki	Suchitra	Snehan	04:59
Unna Onnu	Sabesh, Grace Karunas	Lakshmi Priyan	04:01
Unnai Paartha	Karthik, Harini	Yugabharathi	05:38

== Reception ==
Indiaglitz wrote, "Prasanna after a series of serious portrayals in his earlier films opts for a laugh-riot role. He is at his best in comedy and stunt sequences. However, walking away with all honors is Vadivelu. Playing Prasanna's close aide, he brings the roof down with laughter. His body language and dialogue delivery provides instant laughter."

Behindwoods wrote, "Prasanna has come up with a good performance. Vadivelu and his team guarantee the audience with clean comedy and he rocks as always. The sequences where he encounters a mottai need to be seen to be enjoyed. Visu who comes as a Governor delivers a few orders which are certainly rib ticklers of the highest order. Songs are just average. Many scenes from Seena Thaana are guaranteed to find themselves in the comedy programs of television."

Sify wrote, "The humour here is the "Tom & Jerry", one-man- upmanship type. Prasanna wants to become a cop, but the comedians are determined that he does not get selected. So it becomes a merry-go-round of our hero Vs team of comedians- Vadivelu, Mannivannan, comic villain Riaz Khan and assorted 'terrorist' baddies who want to kill the governor, Visu. Sheela is there for the songs tuned by Deva."

Bharatstudent.com wrote, "Prasanna excels both in the action scenes as well as comedy scenes. His comedy timing is also good. Vadivelu literally steals the show with his comedy. Sheela has a brief role. She acts in a couple of songs and then disappears. Visu, Riyaz Khan, Kasan Khan, Ilavarasu, Delhi Ganesh and others go about their jobs in a neat manner. Deva's music is good. The film is a good entertainer and can be enjoyed by both adults and children alike".

Chennai Online wrote, "No logic, says one of the captions that flash on the screen as the movie opens. And it's not just logic, but your total sensibility that you have to leave behind before you sit to watch this film".
