= Vil Ambu =

2016 Indian film by Ramesh Subramaniam

- Theatrical release poster
- Directed by: Ramesh Subramaniam
- Written by: Ramesh Subramaniam
- Produced by: Suseenthiran (Presenter); N. Thai Saravanan; A. Nandha Kumar
- Starring: Sri; Harish Kalyan; Srushti Dange; Chandini Tamilarasan; Samskruthy Shenoy
- Cinematography: E. Martin Joe
- Edited by: Ruben
- Music by: Navin
- Production company: Star Film Land
- Distributed by: Nallusamy Pictures
- Release date: 12 February 2016
- Country: India
- Language: Tamil

Vil Ambu (transl. Bow and arrow) is a 2016 Indian Tamil-language action thriller film written and directed by Ramesh Subramaniam, and presented by Suseenthiran. The film stars Sri, Harish Kalyan, Srushti Dange, Chandini Tamilarasan, and Samskruthy Shenoy, while Harish Uthaman and Yogi Babu play supporting roles. The music was composed by Navin with cinematography by E. Martin Joe and editing by Ruben. The film was released on 12 February 2016. It was the only film directed by Ramesh before his death in 2026.

== Plot ==
Vil Ambu is a journey of two characters and talks about how humans are responsible for each other's loss or gain. The story is about how the loss of one person becomes the gain of the other.

== Cast ==
- Sri as Karthik
- Harish Kalyan as Arul
- Srushti Dange as Nithya
- Chandini Tamilarasan as Kanakavalli
- Samskruthy Shenoy as Poonkodi
- Nandakumar as Sekar, Poonkodi's father
- Nisha Ganesh as Kavya, Arul's sister
- Harish Uthaman as Siva
- Yogi Babu as Honest
- Ramachandran Durairaj as Logu
- Hello Kandasamy as Karthik's father
- Saivam Kala as Karthik's mother
- Rindhu Ravi as Arul's mother
- Five Star Kalyan as Balaguru

== Production ==
Explaining the relevance of the title Vil Ambu, meaning a bow and arrow, Ramesh Subramaniam said that no one ever has a permanent role in life because "If you are a bow one day, you will be an arrow the next". The director also said the script is based on the six degrees of separation theory. Chandini Tamilarasan was cast after the makers were impressed by her fluency in Tamil; because she plays a slum dweller, she "worked on [her] body language" to achieve the required speaking style. In April 2015, the official title was revealed to be Vil Ambu, with actress Kajal Aggarwal launching the film's motion poster. By December, 70% of filming was complete, having taken place mostly in Coimbatore.

== Soundtrack ==
Music is composed by Navin. A single, "Neeyum Adi Naanum" was released on 20 September 2015 at Loyola College, Chennai, while the audio launch was held a week later at Sathyam Cinemas.

Track listing
No.	Title	Lyrics	Singer(s)	Length
1.	"Ala Sachuputta Kannala"	Ekadasi	Anirudh Ravichander	04:27
2.	"Kurum Padame"	Madhan Karky	G. V. Prakash Kumar	04:30
3.	"Neeyum Adi Naanum"	Madhan Karky	D. Imman, AV Pooja	04:04
Total length:				13:01

== Critical reception ==
S Saraswathi of Rediff.com wrote, "Director Ramesh may have failed to capitalise on an intelligent plot but Vil Ambu is an engaging thriller, well worth a watch." M Suganth of The Times of India wrote appreciated its premise but criticised the director for not taking full advantage of its novelty. Sudhir Srinivasan of The Hindu appreciated the film's "interesting" concept, but criticised its slow pace and predictability. Malini Mannath of The New Indian Express wrote that the director's "effort in carefully etching the screenplay with not many contrived moments, as he merges and separates the two tracks, is laudable".
