= R. S. Prasanna =

Indian film director

- Education: Chinmaya Vidyalaya
- Occupations: Director, screenwriter
- Years active: 2013–present

R. S. Prasanna is an Indian film director and screenwriter who works in Hindi and Tamil films.

== Career ==
In 2013, Prasanna made his directorial debut with the Tamil film Kalyana Samayal Saadham, an offbeat film about erectile dysfunction. He then went on to make a English documentary film on Chinmayananda Saraswati starring Sandeep Hebbar and Thota Tharani. He called his 2017 Hindi film Shubh Mangal Saavdhan, a spiritual remake of Kalyana Samayal Saadham, that retained the soul of the original. He then directed Sitaare Zameen Par (2025), a remake of the Spanish film Champions (2018) and a spiritual sequel of Taare Zameen Par (2007).

== Filmography ==
Year	Title	Language	Notes
2013	Kalyana Samayal Saadham	Tamil	
2014	On a Quest	English	
2017	Shubh Mangal Saavdhan	Hindi	
2025	Sitaare Zameen Par	Hindi	
