= Prasanna (actor) =

Indian actor

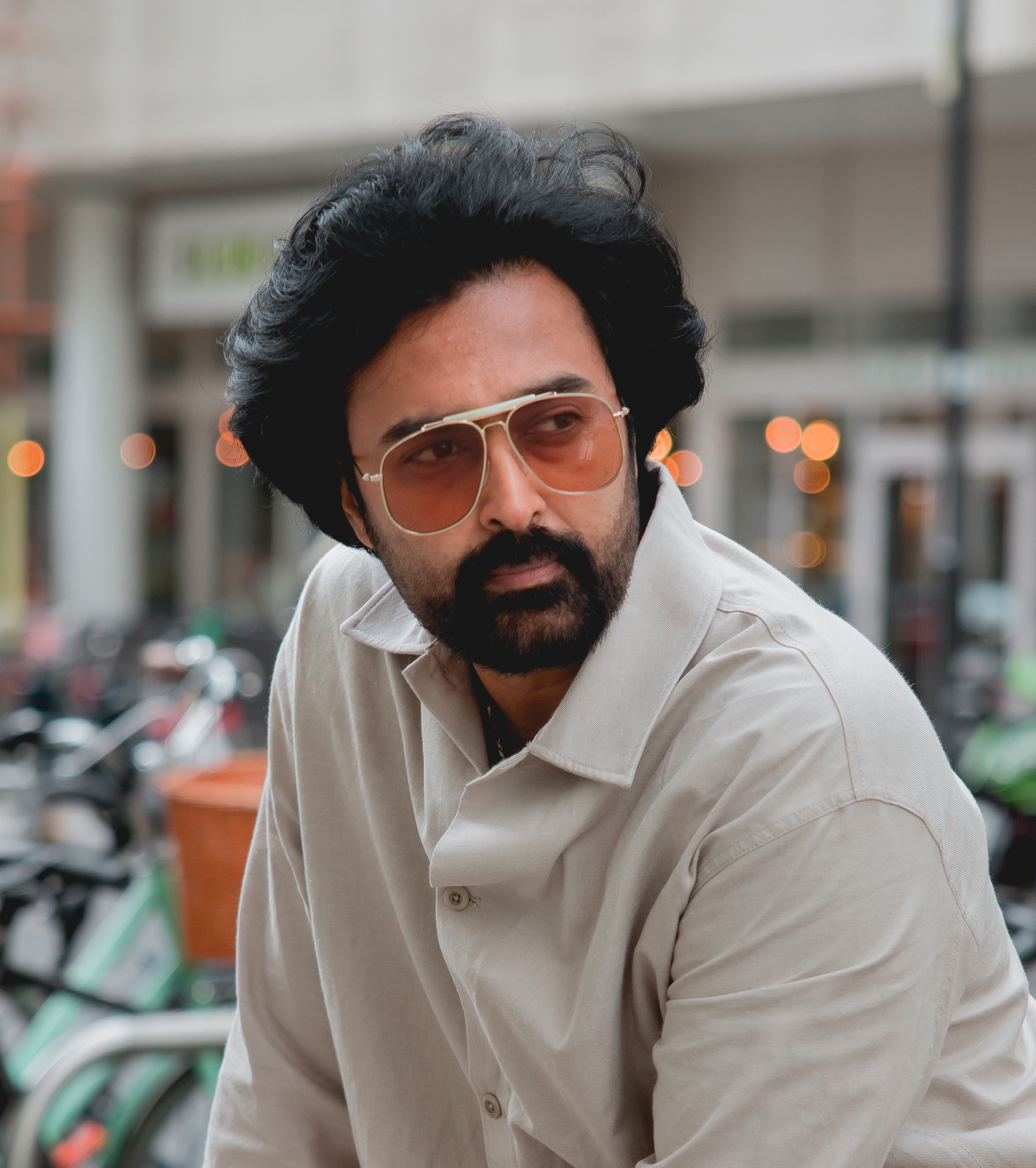
- Born: Prasanna Venkatesan; 28 August 1982 (age 44); Thiruchirappalli, Tamil Nadu, India
- Occupation: Actor
- Years active: 2002–present
- Spouse: Sneha (m. 2012)
- Children: Vihaan, Aadhyanthaa

Prasanna Venkatesan, often credited mononymously as Prasanna, is an Indian actor who works predominantly in the Tamil cinema and alongside appeared in a few Telugu, Malayalam and Kannada films.

He made his first success in Five Star in 2002, which was produced by Mani Ratnam. Some of his other notable films are Azhagiya Theeye (2004), Kasthuri Maan (2005), Kanda Naal Mudhal (2005), Cheena Thaana 001 (2007) and Anjathe (2008). Apart from lead roles, he has also played villain and character roles. His film Achchamundu! Achchamundu!, was screened at many international film festivals.

== Early life and background ==
Prasanna was born in Tiruchirappalli. His father was an employee in BHEL and his mother is a homemaker. He completed his schooling from BHEL Matriculation Higher Secondary School, Tiruchirappalli. Prasanna was good at mimicry and acting, when he was in school and college. He had stated that he always wanted to become an actor. He was an EEE student in Saranathan College of Engineering, Tiruchirapalli, when he responded to an open audition for actors in Susi Ganesan's Five Star (2002), although his parents were unhappy with his decision.

== Film career ==
=== 2002–2009 ===
He debut his career in Five Star, produced by Mani Ratnam's Madras Talkies, featured Prasanna alongside four other newcomers, most notably Kanika; it was well received by critics and performed modestly at the box office. His next two films Ragasiyamai (2003) and Kadhal Dot Com (2004), did not fare well commercially. After Five Star, his noteworthy performance came in Azhagiya Theeye (2004). He cites that the time between Five Star and Azhagiya Theeye was "a painful one", since the roles offered to him were "not the ones" he wanted to play. The film, involving an ensemble cast, was produced by Prakash Raj's Duet Movies and directed by Radha Mohan. Critics commented that he had improved in emoting, labelling his "voice modulation in the humorous scenes" as "impressive". Prakash Raj, impressed by his performance in the film, offered him the lead character in his next production Kanda Naal Mudhal, too. The triangular love story, directed by the newcomer V. Priya, costarring Laila and Karthik Kumar was a commercial success. The film ran for one-hundred days. The comedy flick Cheena Thaana 001, co-starring Sheela and Vadivelu was his only 2007 release.

In 2008, Prasanna was seen in three films. He starred in Siddique's comedy thriller Sadhu Miranda. His role of a modern-day villain was a huge hit in Mysskin's film Anjathe (2008). His negative role was critically acclaimed and fetched him a nomination at the 56th Filmfare Awards South in the Best Supporting Actor category. Later that year, he starred in G. Marimuthu's Kannum Kannum. Regarding his performance, a critic noted that "Prasanna oozes sincerity and his ability to bring the Sathya and Murthy character to life with all the nuances of love, tenderness, humour and frustrations is one of the highlights of the film". He played the lead in Arun Vaidyanathan's Achchamundu! Achchamundu! (2009) opposite Sneha that dealt with the subject of paedophiles. It received rave reviews, and was very well received internationally, but failed at the domestic box office. Manjal Veyil also failed to be successful. During the period, he also worked as a voice actor, speaking dubbing for Aryan Rajesh in Cheran's Pokkisham on the insistence of the director.

=== 2010–2018 ===
Then, alongside Sibiraj as antagonist, he starred in Shakthi Soundar Rajan's Naanayam as a protagonist produced by S.P.B. Charan's Capital Film Works. In Bale Pandiya, directed by Siddharth Chandrasekhar, Prasanna was replaced by Vishnu Vishal. He was seen in a supporting role as a local gangster in Baana Kaathadi. A review from Times of India wrote that "with his eyes-to-die-for and underplayed violence, Prasanna easily steals the show". In 2011, he performed a lead role alongside director-actor Cheran in the thriller film Muran. His character, a "spoiled brat" and son of a millionaire, again had negative shades. He was also approached for Lucky Jokers, which he could not take due to his busy schedule with Muran. He has been approached to play a vital role in the Malayalam Vellaripravinte Changathi, but eventually did not star in the film. In 2013, he played a doctor in the Chennaiyil Oru Naal, a remake of the Malayalam film Traffic (2011). The film featured an ensemble cast and released to positive reviews. That same year, he made his Telugu debut with Bhai and starred in the successful romantic comedy Kalyana Samayal Saadham. Regarding his performance, a critic stated that "Prasanna deserves special credit for playing a role that most actors would hesitate to take up".

2014 saw the release of Pulivaal and the long delayed Netru Indru; both films featured himself and Vimal in the lead. The former was directed by Marimuthu and was based on the Malayalam film Chaappa Kurishu (2011). While Pulivaal released to positive reviews, Netru Indru released to negative reviews. His subsequent films released to positive reviews: Pa. Pandi, Nibunan, Thupparivaalan, and Thiruttu Payale 2. His performance in Thirittu Payale 2 fetched him the Filmfare Award for Best Supporting Actor – Tamil. He returned to Telugu cinema with Jawaan, which featured him as the antagonist and released to negative reviews. In 2018, he starred in Kaalakkoothu; he was cast after Shaam left the film. The film received mixed reviews upon release.

=== 2019–present ===
In 2019, he marks the digital debut in the Television series Thiravam. Prasanna plays the middle-aged, socially awkward, grey-haired scientist. he then starred in the Telugu film Viswamitra and made his Malayalam debut with Brother's Day. Brothers Day released to mixed reviews. In 2020, Mafia: Chapter 1, received mixed reviews upon release followed by Naanga Romba Busy. In 2021, Prasanna is part of Project Agni from Navarasa, a science-fiction story in which he plays an ISRO scientist. In 2022, he appeared successively in television series such as Fingertip season 2, Victim and Mad Company. In 2023, he starred in Kannai Nambathey and the Malayalam film, King of Kotha. In 2024, he was seen in the Television series Cheran's Journey as well as the Hindi Ranneeti: Balakot & Beyond where he plays the role of Indian Air Force Wing Commander. The next, Prasanna joins the cast of Ajith Kumar's Good Bad Ugly (2025).

== Personal life ==
During the filming of Achchamundu! Achchamundu! it was reported that he fell in love with Sneha, but he denied the idea of marrying an actress.

Prasanna eventually married Sneha on 11 May 2012. The couple have two children.

== Filmography ==
Key
†	Denotes films that have not yet been released

=== As actor ===
- Note: all films are in Tamil, unless otherwise noted.

List of Prasanna film credits as actor
Year	Film	Role	Notes
2002	Five Star	Prabhu	
2003	Ragasiyamai	Amudhan	
2004	Kadhal Dot Com	Vinod	
2004	Azhagiya Theeye	Chandran	
2005	Kasthuri Maan	Arunachalam	
2005	Kanda Naal Mudhal	Krishna	
2007	Cheena Thaana 001	Tamilarasu	
2008	Sadhu Miranda	Sundaramoorthy	
2008	Anjathe	Dhaya	ITFA Best Villain Award; Nominated, Filmfare Award for Best Supporting Actor – Tamil
2008	Kannum Kannum	Sathyamoorthy	
2009	Manjal Veiyil	Vijay	
2009	Achchamundu! Achchamundu!	Senthil Kumar	Edison Award for Best Character (Male); Tamil Nadu State Film Award Special Prize
2010	Naanayam	Ravi Bhaskar	
2010	Goa	Sakthi Saravanan	Guest appearance
2010	Baana Kaathadi	'Maanja' Ravi	
2011	Muran	Arjun	
2013	Chennaiyil Oru Naal	Robin	
2013	Bhai	Arjun	Telugu film
2013	Kalyana Samayal Saadham	Raghu Viswanathan	Also singer for "Pallu Pona Raja"
2014	Pulivaal	Karthik	
2014	Netru Indru	David	
2015	JK Enum Nanbanin Vaazhkai	Himself	Simultaneously shot in Telugu as Rajadhi Raja; Cameo appearance
2017	Mupparimanam	Himself	Cameo appearance
2017	Pa. Pandi	Raghavan	
2017	Nibunan	Inspector Joseph	Simultaneously shot in Kannada as Vismaya
2017	Thupparivaalan	Manohar	
2017	Thiruttu Payale 2	Balakrishnan (Balki)	Filmfare Award for Best Supporting Actor – Tamil
2017	Jawaan	Keshava	Telugu film
2018	Kaalakkoothu	Easwaran	
2019	Viswamitra	CI Gopal	Telugu film
2019	Brother's Day	Shiva	Malayalam film
2020	Mafia: Chapter 1	Diwakar Kumaran	
2020	Naanga Romba Busy	Inspector Kumaravel	Television film
2023	Kannai Nambathey	Somu	
2023	King of Kotha	Shahul Hassan	Malayalam film
2025	Good Bad Ugly	Jaeger	

=== As voice over artist ===
List of Prasanna film credits as voice over artist
Year	Film	Actor
2009	Pokkisham	Aryan Rajesh
2010	Raavanan	Ashwanth Thilak

=== Television series ===
List of Prasanna television credits
Year	Program Name	Role	Network	Notes
2019	Thiravam	Ravi Prakasam	ZEE5	
2020	Addham	Krish	Aha	Telugu webseries Segment: Crossroads
2021	Navarasa	Krishna	Netflix	Segment: Project Agni
2022	Fingertip	ACP Arivazhagan Arivu	ZEE5	Season 2
2022	Victim	Killer	SonyLIV	Segment: "Confession"
2022	Mad Company	AK	Aha	
2023	Iru Dhuruvam 2	Langeswaran	SonyLIV	Season 2
2024	Cheran’s Journey	Raghav Isakkimuthu	SonyLIV	
2024	Ranneeti: Balakot & Beyond	Wing commander Abhimanyu Vardhan	JioCinema	Hindi webseries

== Television ==
List of Prasanna television credits
Year	Show	Role	Channel
2010	Honeymoon Jodigal	Host	Sun TV
2018	Soppana Sundari	Host	Sun Life
